= Barry Lunney Jr. =

American football player and coach (born 1974)

Current position
- Title: Offensive coordinator & quarterbacks coach
- Team: Illinois
- Conference: Big Ten

Biographical details
- Born: September 11, 1974 (age 52); Fort Smith, Arkansas, U.S.

Playing career
- 1992–1995: Arkansas
- Position: Quarterback

Coaching career (HC unless noted)
- 1998–1999: Arkansas (GA)
- 2000–2001: Tulsa (QB)
- 2002: Tulsa (WR)
- 2003–2004: San Jose State (co-OC/QB)
- 2005–2012: Bentonville HS (AR) (OC/QB)
- 2013–2018: Arkansas (TE)
- 2019: Arkansas (ST/TE)
- 2019: Arkansas (interim HC)
- 2020–2021: UTSA (AHC/OC/QB)
- 2022–present: Illinois (OC/QB)

Head coaching record
- Overall: 0–2

Barry Lunney Jr. (born September 11, 1974) is an American American college football coach. He is the offensive coordinator at the University of Illinois Urbana-Champaign. Lunney served as the interim head football coach at the University of Arkansas for the final two games of the 2019 season.

== Playing career ==
Lunney Jr. started at quarterback for his father, Barry Lunney Sr., at Southside High School in Fort Smith, Arkansas, leading that team to the 1991 state championship as a senior. Lunney Jr. then signed a scholarship to play for the Arkansas Razorbacks as part of the 1992 signing class, and went on to start 40 games at quarterback during his playing career at Arkansas.

Arkansas head coach Jack Crowe was fired after the first game of the 1992 season, and defensive coordinator Joe Kines took over as interim head coach. Kines brought in his friend Danny Ford as an advisor. Kines named Lunney Jr as the starter prior to the game at Tennessee in 1992, and he led the Hogs to an upset victory over the #4 Vols, 25-24, thanks to a field goal on the last play of the game by placekicker Todd Wright. But the Hogs struggled to a 3–7–1 record in 1992. Ford was named the new head coach after that season. Lunney Jr and the Razorbacks finished the 1993 season 5–5–1 (later changed to 6-4-1 after Alabama was forced to forfeit several games for that season), that included a victory over #24 Georgia in Athens. Arkansas regressed to 4–7 in 1994.

Lunney Jr. was selected as one of the team captains for the 1995 Arkansas Razorbacks football team, and led that squad to Arkansas' first SEC Western Division title, and the program's first appearance in the SEC Championship game. There were a number of other firsts in the 1995 season for Lunney Jr and the Hogs: Lunney Jr. led Arkansas to their first victories over Alabama, Auburn, Memphis, Mississippi State, and their first win in a game played in the Liberty Bowl facility when Arkansas defeated Ole Miss in a conference game played at the stadium due to construction at Ole Miss' home stadium in Oxford. Arkansas finished the 1995 team with an 8–5 record.

Lunney Jr. held the team record for passing yards, passing touchdowns, pass completions, pass attempts and total offensive plays for a few years after his graduation, until he was eventually surpassed by Clint Stoerner in 1999. Lunney Jr. also played college baseball and one season of Minor League Baseball for the Minnesota Twins organization in 1997, before returning to football as a coach.

== Coaching career ==
Lunney Jr. began his coaching career as a graduate assistant coach during the 1998 and 1999 seasons at Arkansas before moving to Tulsa for the 2000, 2001, and 2002 seasons as quarterbacks (2000-2001) and wide receivers (2002) coach. He then moved on to be the co-offensive coordinator and quarterbacks coach for San Jose State for two seasons, the last of which the Spartans ranked 17th in the NCAA in passing offense. From 2005 to 2012, Lunney Jr. was the offensive coordinator and quarterbacks coach for Bentonville High School in Northwest Arkansas, during which time the team won six conference titles and two state championships.

=== Arkansas ===
From the 2013 to the 2019 season, Lunney Jr. was the tight ends coach and recruiting coordinator for in-state recruits at Arkansas. From 2014-2016, Lunney developed one of the top tight ends in Arkansas history in Hunter Henry, who won the John Mackey Award and was a consensus first-team All-American as a junior in 2015. On November 11, 2019, Barry Lunney Jr. took over as interim head coach for Arkansas, following the firing of former head coach Chad Morris. During his tenure as interim head coach, Arkansas lost at eventual national champion #1 LSU, and at home to Missouri.

=== UTSA ===
Lunney was named associate head coach, offensive coordinator and quarterbacks coach at University of Texas at San Antonio (UTSA) on December 13, 2019.

Prior to UTSA's matchup against Louisiana in the 2020 First Responder Bowl, UTSA head coach Jeff Traylor tested positive for COVID-19. Lunney served as acting head coach for the game. UTSA lost the game, 31–24, finishing the season at 7–5.

The 2021 UTSA Roadrunners football team compiled a record of 12–2. They won the Conference USA West Division championship, before defeating Western Kentucky in the Conference USA Football Championship Game, 49–41, to claim the program's first conference title. UTSA ended the season at the Frisco Bowl, where they lost to San Diego State, 38–24. UTSA's offense, under Lunney, averaged 442.9 total yards, 254.3 passing yards, 188.6 rushing yards, and 37.8 points per game.

=== Illinois ===
In December 2021, Lunney was hired as the offensive coordinator for the Illinois Fighting Illini football team by former Arkansas head coach Bret Bielema. Illinois would finish the season 8-5 after losing to Mississippi State in the Reliaquest Bowl. Under Lunney's play-calling, Illinois' offense averaged 379.1 yards per game, 211.8 yards passing, 167.3 yards rushing, and 24.2 points per game. It was Illinois' first bowl game appearance since 2019, and their first winning season since 2011.

During the 2022 season, Lunney Jr. agreed to a one-year contract extension through the 2025 season, given in large part because the Illini were one of the most improved offenses in the Big Ten. The contract extension also increases Lunney's salary from $675,000 per year to $800,000 beginning in 2023 and $825,000 in each of the following two years.

After a down year in 2023 when the Illini finished 5-7, Illinois bounced back in 2024 to finish 10-3 and beat South Carolina in the 2024 Citrus Bowl. Lunney Jr's offense averaged 211.2 passing yards per game, 153.6 rushing yards per game, and 28.3 points per game.

== Head coaching record ==
Year	Team	Overall	Conference	Standing	Bowl/playoffs
Arkansas Razorbacks (Southeastern Conference) (2019)
2019	Arkansas	0–2 (Note: Chad Morris served as Arkansas's head coach for the first ten games of the 2019 season before he was fired. Lunney Jr. was appointed as interim head coach for the last two games of the season. Arkansas finished the year with an overall record of 2–10 and a conference mark of 0–8.)	0–2	7th (Western)	
Arkansas:		0–2	0–2		
Total:		0–2			

== Personal life ==
Lunney graduated from Arkansas in 1996 with a bachelor's degree in kinesiology. He and his wife, Janelle, have two sons, Luke and Levi. His grandfather, John, lettered at Arkansas from 1946-49. His father, Barry Sr., retired after 28 years as a high school football coach in Arkansas, winning eight state championships at Bentonville High School and Fort Smith Southside High School.
