= 2021 UTSA Roadrunners football team =

American college football season

2021 UTSA Roadrunners football

C-USA champion C-USA West Division champion

C-USA Championship Game, W 49–41 vs. Western Kentucky

Frisco Bowl, L 24–38 vs. San Diego State
- Conference: Conference USA
- West Division
- Record: 12–2 (7–1 C-USA)
- Head coach: Jeff Traylor (2nd season)
- Offensive coordinator: Barry Lunney Jr. (2nd season)
- Offensive scheme: Pro-style
- Defensive coordinator: Rod Wright (1st season)
- Co-defensive coordinator: Jess Loepp (1st season)
- Base defense: 3–4
- Home stadium: Alamodome

2021 Conference USA football standings
	Conf.			Overall
Team	W		L	W		L
East Division
Western Kentucky xy	7	–	1	9	–	5
Marshall	5	–	3	7	–	6
Old Dominion	5	–	3	6	–	7
Middle Tennessee	4	–	4	7	–	6
Florida Atlantic	3	–	5	5	–	7
Charlotte	3	–	5	5	–	7
FIU	0	–	8	1	–	11
West Division
UTSA xy$	7	–	1	12	–	2
UAB	6	–	2	9	–	4
North Texas	5	–	3	6	–	7
UTEP	4	–	4	7	–	6
Rice	3	–	5	4	–	8
Southern Miss	2	–	6	3	–	9
Louisiana Tech	2	–	6	3	–	9
Championship: UTSA 49, Western Kentucky 41
$ – Conference champion; x – Division champion/co-champions; y – Championship game participant

The 2021 UTSA Roadrunners football team represented the University of Texas at San Antonio during the 2021 NCAA Division I FBS football season. The Roadrunners played their home games at the Alamodome in San Antonio, Texas, and competed in the West Division of Conference USA (C-USA). The team was coached by second-year head coach Jeff Traylor.

After a win against Memphis on September 25, UTSA became 4–0 for the first time since the 2012 season. Two weeks later, on October 9, the program became 6–0 for the first time in its history after defeating Western Kentucky. A week later, on the weekend of October 16, the program entered the national polls for the first time, reaching No. 24 in the AP poll and No. 25 in the Coaches poll. The Roadrunners remained undefeated for the first time in its history until their 23–45 loss in the final game of the regular season against North Texas Mean Green football team. A 34–31 victory over UAB clinched the Conference USA Western Division title, their first in program history. The win also confirmed that the Roadrunners would play in their first conference championship game in program history, which they won 49–41 over WKU on December 3.

== Preseason ==
=== C-USA media days ===
The Roadrunners were predicted to finish in second place in the West Division in the Conference USA preseason poll.

== Schedule and results ==
UTSA announced its 2021 football schedule on January 27, 2021. The 2021 schedule consisted of 6 home and 6 away games in the regular season.

Date	Time	Opponent	Rank	Site	TV	Result	Attendance
September 4	6:30 p.m.	at Illinois*		Memorial Stadium; Champaign, IL	BTN	W 37–30	33,906
September 11	5:00 p.m.	Lamar*		Alamodome; San Antonio, TX	ESPN3	W 54–0	16,229
September 18	5:00 p.m.	Middle Tennessee		Alamodome; San Antonio, TX	ESPN+	W 27–13	16,202
September 25	2:30 p.m.	at Memphis*		Liberty Bowl Memorial Stadium; Memphis, TN	ESPNU	W 31–28	29,264
October 2	5:00 p.m.	UNLV*		Alamodome; San Antonio, TX	ESPN+	W 24–17	20,154
October 9	6:00 p.m.	at Western Kentucky		Houchens Industries–L. T. Smith Stadium; Bowling Green, KY	Stadium	W 52–46	15,243
October 16	5:00 p.m.	Rice^{†}		Alamodome; San Antonio, TX	ESPN+	W 45–0	27,515
October 23	6:00 p.m.	at Louisiana Tech	No. 24	Joe Aillet Stadium; Ruston, LA	Stadium	W 45–16	18,314
November 6	9:15 p.m.	at UTEP		Sun Bowl; El Paso, TX	ESPN2	W 44–23	31,658
November 13	2:30 p.m.	Southern Miss	No. 23	Alamodome; San Antonio, TX	ESPN+	W 27–17	30,105
November 20	2:30 p.m.	UAB	No. 22	Alamodome; San Antonio, TX	ESPN+	W 34–31	35,167
November 27	1:00 p.m.	at North Texas	No. 22	Apogee Stadium; Denton, TX	ESPN+	L 23–45	16,933
December 3	6:00 p.m.	Western Kentucky		Alamodome; San Antonio, TX (C-USA Championship Game)	CBSSN	W 49–41	41,148
December 21	6:30 p.m.	vs. No. 24 San Diego State*		Toyota Stadium; Frisco, TX (Frisco Bowl)	ESPN	L 24–38	15,801
*Non-conference game; ^{†}Homecoming; Rankings from AP Poll (and CFP Rankings, after November 2) - Released prior to game; All times are in Central time

Schedule source:

== Personnel ==
=== Coaching staff ===
Name	Position	Consecutive season at UTSA in current position	Alma Mater
Jeff Traylor	Head coach	2	Stephen F. Austin (1990)
Barry Lunney Jr.	Associate head coach/offensive coordinator/quarterbacks	2	Arkansas (1996)
Jess Loepp	Co-defensive coordinator/safeties	2	University of Central Oklahoma (2000)
Rod Wright	Co-defensive coordinator/defensive line	3	Texas (2011)
Tommy Perry	Special teams coordinator	2	Texas A&M (2003)
Matt Mattox	Offensive line/Run Game Coordinator	2	Houston (2005)
Will Stein	Wide receivers/Passing Game Coordinator	2	Louisville (2011)
Nick Graham	Cornerbacks	2	Tulsa (2013)
Julian Griffin	Running backs	2	Louisiana–Monroe (2012)
Brad Sherrod	Linebackers	1	Duke (1993)
Kurt Traylor	Tight ends	2	Texas A&M–Commerce (1995)

=== Roster ===
2021 UTSA Roadrunners Football
Quarterback: 0 – Frank Harris – Senior (6'0, 200); 8 – Josh Adkins – Senior (6'2, 220); 10 – Lowell Narcisse– Senior (6'2, 255); 12 – Eddie Lee Marburger – Freshman (6'3, 205); 18 – Cam Peters – Freshman (6'4, 205); 19 – Zach Rangel – (redshirt) Junior (6'2, 205); Running back: 3 – Sincere McCormick - Junior (5'9, 205); 5 – Brenden Brady - Senior (5'11, 215); 17 – Kaedric Cobbs - Sophomore (5'10, 210); 21 – Justin Rodriguez - Freshman (5'7, 180); 28 – Jaylon Lott - Sophomore (6'0, 215); 30 – De'Anthony Lewis - Freshman (6'1, 195); 31 – Kevorian Barnes - Freshman (5'10, 195); 33 – B.J. Daniels - Senior (6'1, 210); Wide receiver: 2 – Joshua Cephus – Junior (6'3, 190); 4 – Zakhari Franklin – Junior (6'1, 185); 11 – Tykee Ogle-Kellogg – Junior (6'5, 200); 13 – Sheldon Jones – Senior (5'9, 160); 14 – Isaiah Davis – Sophomore (6'1, 195); 15 – Cade Stoever – (redshirt) Junior (5'10, 190); 19 – Julon Williams – (redshirt) Junior (5'9, 190); 24 – Dre Spriggs – Freshman (6'3, 170); 29 – Kyle Eaves – Freshman (5'9, 145); 32 – Karch Gardiner – Sophomore (5'9, 180); 81 – Tre'Von Bradley – Junior (6'1, 185); 82 – Jaren Randle – Freshman (6'2, 185); 83 – Gregory Clayton Jr. – Senior (5'10, 180); 85 – Kennedy Lewis – Freshman (6'3, 190); 88 – De'Corian Clark – Junior (6'2, 210); Placekicker: 5 - Hunter Duplessis - Senior (5'9, 190); 92 - Everett Ornstein - Sophomore (6'0, 175); 34 - Colby McBerty - Freshman (6'5, 180); Punter: 35 - Lucas Dean - Junior (6'2, 205); 91 - Ethan Laing - Freshman (5'11, 190)	Tight end: 1 - Leroy Watson - Senior (6'5, 275); 16 - Allen Horace II - Sophomore (6'4, 250); 34 - JaCorey Hyder - Freshman (6'3, 245); 37 - Myles Benning - Senior (6'0, 250); 45 - Ke'Chawn Compton - Junior (6'2, 240); 80 - Dan Dishman - Freshman (6'5, 235); 84 - Oscar Cardenas - Sophomore (6'4, 275); 86 - Peter Gray - Junior (6'4, 250); 87 - Gavin Sharp - Senior (6'5, 235); Offensive lineman: 55 - Ahofitu Maka - Senior (6'3, 335); 56 - Alex Wyant - Junior (6'5, 310); 58 - Terrell Haynes - Junior (6'3, 340); 61 - Kevin Davis - Senior (6'3, 335); 62 - Robert Rigsby - Freshman (6'4, 330); 63 - Jordan Brown - Freshman (6'3, 325); 64 - Ernesto Almaraz - Junior (6'2, 295); 65 - Kamron Scott - Freshman (6'4, 340); 66 - Dominic Pastucci - Senior (6'5, 315); 68 - Frankie Martinez - Freshman (6'3, 295); 69 - Monte Williams - Sophomore (6'2, 310); 70 - Jalyn Galmore - Senior (6'5, 295); 71 - Rudy Aleman Jr. - Junior (6'1, 315); 72 - River Gordon - Freshman (6'4, 305); 73 - Demetris Allen - Sophomore (6'3, 285); 74 - Spencer Burford - Senior (6'5, 295); 75 - Brandon Rolfe - (redshirt) Senior (6'3, 310); 76 - Luke Lapeze - Freshman (6'5, 305); 77 - Makai Hart - Senior (6'4, 300); 78 - Daniel Santallana - Freshman (6'3, 295); 79 - Ronnie Garza - Freshman (6'6, 295); Defensive lineman: 1 - Jaylon Haynes - Senior (6'2, 300); 6 - Lorenzo Dantzler - Senior (6'1, 260); 17 - Asyrus Simon - Sophomore (6'4, 265); 33 - Lamonte McDougle - Junior (6'0, 290); 44 - Ronald Triplette - Freshman (6'2, 260); 49 - Trumane Bell II - Junior (6'2, 255); 50 - Jaden Jones - Freshman (6'2, 300); 90 - Brandon Brown - Freshman (6'2, 305); 95 - Christian Clayton - Sophomore (6'2, 275); 97 - Walker Baty - Sophomore (6'3, 290); 99 - Brandon Matterson - Senior (6'2, 290)	Outside Linebacker: 2 - Charles Wiley - Senior (6'3, 255); 7 - Dadrian Taylor - (redshirt) Senior (5'11, 175); 9 - Clarence Hicks - Senior (6'2, 225); 12 - Donyai Taylor - Sophomore (6'1, 205); 18 - Malik Jones - Sophomore (6'2, 190); 40 - Jimmori Robinson - Sophomore (6'6, 235); 45 - DeQuarius Henry - Senior (6'3, 240); 54 - Caleb Lewis - Freshman (6'3, 225); 56 - Trey Moore - Freshman (6'2, 250); Inside Linebacker: 8 - Jamal Ligon - Sophomore (6'2, 220); 15 - Trevor Harmanson - Senior (6'3, 225); 16 - Dru Prox - Senior (6'2, 225); 20 - Denzel Feaster - Senior (6'3, 225); 20 - Cameron Wilkins - Senior (6'2, 230); 25 - Avery Morris - Sophomore (6'2, 225); 32 - Caden Holt - Freshman (6'1, 215); 37 - Nate Hawkins - Freshman (6'0, 220); 38 - Tyler Mahnke - Senior (6'3, 235); 39 - Kyle Wakefield - Junior (6'0, 210); 41 - De'Marco Guidry - Senior (6'0, 220); Safety: 0 - Rashad Wisdom - Junior (5'9, 205); 4 - Antonio Parks - Senior (5'8, 190); 10 - Clifford Chattman - Senior (6'5, 190); 11 - Kelechi Nwachuku - Junior (6'0, 210); 13 - Jahmal Sam - Sophomore (5'9, 185); 22 - Ryan Shockency - (redshirt) Junior (6'0, 185); 27 - Jarrett Preston - (redshirt) Junior (6'0, 190); 28 - Je'Vaun Dabon - Sophomore (6'1, 180); 35 - Ronald Gurley - Freshman (6'2, 210); Cornerback: 3 - Tariq Woolen - (redshirt) Senior (6'4, 205); 14 - Dywan Griffin - Junior (5'11, 180); 16 - JayVeon Cardwell - Junior (5'11, 195); 21 - Ken Robinson - (redshirt) Sophomore (5'11, 175); 23 - Xavier Spencer - Sophomore (6'1, 185); 24 - Jalen Rainey - Freshman (6'4, 200); 26 - Corey Mayfield Jr. - Senior (5'11, 190); 29 - Xavier Player - Freshman (6'0, 175); 36 - Sean Berry - Sophomore (5'10, 175); Long snappers: 52 - Cade Collenback - Junior (6'2, 240); 53 - Caleb Cantrell - Senior (5'11, 215)
Source and player details, 2021 UTSA Football Roster (09/16/2021):

== Game summaries ==
=== At Illinois ===
UTSA Roadrunners at Illinois Fighting Illini – Game summary

Quarter	1	2	3	4	Total
Roadrunners	7	13	3	14	37
Fighting Illini	0	14	3	13	30

at Memorial Stadium, Champaign, Illinois

- Date: September 4
- Game time: 6:30 p.m.
- Game weather: Temperature: 73 °F (23 °C) • Weather: Cloudy • Wind: W 3 MPH
- Game attendance: 33,906
- Referee: Greg Blum
- TV announcers (BTN): Lisa Byington (play-by-play), Anthony Herron (analyst) and Coley Harvey (sideline)
- Box score, Recap

Game information

First quarter

- UTSA – Frank Harris 9-yard run (Hunter Duplessis kick), 1:32. Roadrunners 7–0. Drive: 13 plays, 94 yards, 4:40.

Second quarter

- UTSA – Brendan Brady 7-yard run (Hunter Duplessis kick), 11:31. Roadrunners 14–0. Drive: 9 plays, 61 yards, 3:43.
- ILL – Deuce Span 31-yard pass from Artur Sitkowski (James McCourt kick), 9:21. Roadrunners 14–7. Drive: 5 plays, 65 yards, 2:10.
- UTSA – Hunter Duplessis 32-yard field goal, 6:24. Roadrunners 17–7. Drive: 9 plays, 60 yards, 2:57.
- ILL – Daniel Barker 14-yard pass from Artur Sitkowski (James McCourt kick), 2:46. Roadrunners 17–14. Drive: 8 plays, 75 yards, 3:38.
- UTSA – Hunter Duplessis 28-yard field goal, 0:47. Roadrunners 20–14. Drive: 5 plays, 15 yards, 1:01.

Third quarter

- ILL – James McCourt 52-yard field goal, 9:22. Roadrunners 20–17. Drive: 4 plays, -2 yards, 1:26.
- UTSA – Hunter Duplessis 27-yard field goal, 3:19. Roadrunners 23–17. Drive: 10 plays, 75 yards, 3:39.

Fourth quarter

- ILL – James McCourt 53-yard field goal, 14:15. Roadrunners 23–20. Drive: 8 plays, 30 yards, 4:04.
- UTSA – Zakhari Franklin 19-yard pass from Frank Harris (Hunter Duplessis kick), 12:37. Roadrunners 30–20. Drive: 5 plays, 75 yards, 1:38.
- ILL – Daniel Barker 15-yard pass from Artur Sitkowski (James McCourt kick), 9:56. Roadrunners 30–27. Drive: 6 plays, 75 yards, 2:41.
- UTSA – Brendan Brady 33-yard run (Hunter Duplessis kick), 4:57. Roadrunners 37–27. Drive: 10 plays, 75 yards, 4:59.
- ILL – James McCourt 32-yard field goal, 1:55. Roadrunners 37–30. Drive: 14 plays, 60 yards, 2:56.

Top passers

- UTSA – Frank Harris – 20/32, 280 yards, TD
- ILL – Artur Sitkowski – 22/42, 266 yards, 3 TD

Top rushers

- UTSA – Sincere McCormick – 31 rushes, 117 yards
- ILL – Reggie Love III – 11 rushes, 39 yards

Top receivers

- UTSA – Zakhari Franklin – 10 receptions, 155 yards, TD
- ILL – Isaiah Williams – 8 receptions, 101 yards

=== Lamar ===
Lamar Cardinals at UTSA Roadrunners – Game summary

Quarter	1	2	3	4	Total
Cardinals	0	0	0	0	0
Roadrunners	13	21	10	10	54

at Alamodome, San Antonio, Texas

- Date: September 11
- Game time: 5:00 p.m.
- Game weather: None (indoor stadium)
- Game attendance: 16,229
- Referee: Tobian Johnson
- TV announcers (ESPN3): Lincoln Rose (play-by-play) and LaDarrin McLane (analyst)
- Box score, Recap

Game information

First quarter

- UTSA – Sheldon Jones 76-yard punt return (Hunter Duplessis kick), 12:04. Roadrunners 7–0.
- UTSA – Hunter Duplessis 46-yard field goal, 8:18. Roadrunners 10–0. Drive: 5 plays, 29 yards, 1:12.
- UTSA – Hunter Duplessis 46-yard field goal, 3:11. Roadrunners 13–0. Drive: 7 plays, 22 yards, 1:54.

Second quarter

- UTSA – Sincere McCormick 18-yard run (Hunter Duplessis kick), 14:04. Roadrunners 20–0. Drive: 6 plays, 74 yards, 2:09.
- UTSA – Charles Wiley 8-yard run (Hunter Duplessis kick), 9:14. Roadrunners 27–0. Drive: 8 plays, 19 yards, 4:50.
- UTSA – Sincere McCormick 6-yard run (Hunter Duplessis kick), 0:55. Roadrunners 34–0. Drive: 11 plays, 65 yards, 5:08.

Third quarter

- UTSA – Zakhari Franklin 32-yard pass from Josh Adkins (Hunter Duplessis kick), 13:42. Roadrunners 41–0. Drive: 4 plays, 58 yards, 1:10.
- UTSA – Hunter Duplessis 41-yard field goal, 7:29. Roadrunners 44–0. Drive: 8 plays, 36 yards, 4:32.

Fourth quarter

- UTSA – De'Corian Clark 16-yard pass from Josh Adkins (Hunter Duplessis kick), 14:06. Roadrunners 51–0. Drive: 10 plays, 59 yards, 5:32.
- UTSA – Hunter Duplessis 23-yard field goal, 4:58. Roadrunners 54–0. Drive: 9 plays, 79 yards, 4:45.

Top passers

- LAM – Jalen Dummett – 6/11, 33 yards
- UTSA – Josh Adkins – 11/13, 134 yards, 2 TD

Top rushers

- LAM – James Jones – 13 rushes, 50 yards
- UTSA – Sincere McCormick – 7 rushes, 46 yards, 2 TD

Top receivers

- LAM – Jeremy Davis – 2 receptions, 19 yards
- UTSA – Cade Stoever – 2 receptions, 84 yards

=== Middle Tennessee ===
Middle Tennessee Blue Raiders at UTSA Roadrunners – Game summary

Quarter	1	2	3	4	Total
Blue Raiders	0	0	0	13	13
Roadrunners	7	3	7	10	27

at Alamodome, San Antonio, Texas

- Date: September 18
- Game time: 5:00 p.m.
- Game weather: None (indoor stadium)
- Game attendance: 16,202
- Referee: Kevin Randall
- TV announcers (ESPN+): Lincoln Rose (play-by-play) and LaDarrin McLane (analyst)
- Box score, Recap

Game information

First quarter

- UTSA – Zakhari Franklin 33-yard pass from Frank Harris (Hunter Duplessis kick), 3:01. Roadrunners 7–0. Drive: 7 plays, 86 yards, 2:48.

Second quarter

- UTSA – Hunter Duplessis 30-yard field goal, 2:22. Roadrunners 10–0. Drive: 16 plays, 72 yards, 6:39.

Third quarter

- UTSA – Joshua Cephus 12-yard pass from Frank Harris (Hunter Duplessis kick), 10:08. Roadrunners 17–0. Drive: 15 plays, 76 yards, 4:45.

Fourth quarter

- UTSA – Lorenzo Dantzler 3-yard fumble return (Hunter Duplessis kick), 12:56. Roadrunners 24–0.
- UTSA – Hunter Duplessis 38-yard field goal, 8:01. Roadrunners 27–0. Drive: 7 plays, 21 yards, 3:12.
- MTSU – Jimmy Marshall 23-yard pass from Chase Cunningham (pass failed), 3:28. Roadrunners 27–6. Drive: 4 plays, 54 yards, 1:50.
- MTSU – Jarrin Pierce 16-yard pass from Chase Cunningham (Zeke Rankin kick), 0:57. Roadrunners 27–13. Drive: 4 plays, 69 yards, 1:23.

Top passers

- MTSU – Chase Cunningham – 9/18, 150 yards, 2 TD
- UTSA – Frank Harris – 24/39, 264 yards, 2 TD, 2 INT

Top rushers

- MTSU – Amir Rasul – 8 rushes, 23 yards
- UTSA – Sincere McCormick – 23 rushes, 105 yards

Top receivers

- MTSU – Izaiah Gathings – 3 receptions, 65 yards
- UTSA – Zakhari Franklin – 8 receptions, 114 yards, TD

=== At Memphis ===
UTSA Roadrunners at Memphis Tigers – Game summary

Quarter	1	2	3	4	Total
Roadrunners	0	7	7	17	31
Tigers	21	0	7	0	28

at Liberty Bowl Memorial Stadium, Memphis, Tennessee

- Date: September 25
- Game time: 2:30 p.m.
- Game weather: Temperature: 82 °F (28 °C) • Weather: Sunny • Wind: W 6 MPH
- Game attendance: 29,624
- Referee: Joe Lehring
- TV announcers (ESPNU): John Schriffen (play-by-play) and Rene Ingoglia (analyst)
- Box score, Recap

Game information

First quarter

- MEM – Wardalis Ducksworth 0-yard fumble return (Joe Doyle kick), 13:24. Tigers 7–0.
- MEM – Rodrigues Clark 7-yard run (Joe Doyle kick), 9:23. Tigers 14–0. Drive: 8 plays, 62 yards, 3:20.
- MEM – Calvin Austin III 60-yard pass from Seth Henigan (Joe Doyle kick), 6:22. Tigers 21–0. Drive: 5 plays, 81 yards, 1:32.

Second quarter

- UTSA – Sincere McCormick 12-yard run (Hunter Duplessis kick), 9:54. Tigers 21–7. Drive: 12 plays, 87 yards, 4:56.

Third quarter

- UTSA – Sincere McCormick 8-yard run (Hunter Duplessis kick), 5:25. Tigers 21–14. Drive: 11 plays, 66 yards, 3:19.
- MEM – Brandon Thomas 1-yard run (Joe Doyle kick), 2:44. Tigers 28–14. Drive: 7 plays, 73 yards, 2:36.

Fourth quarter

- UTSA – Zakhari Franklin 7-yard pas from Frank Harris (Hunter Duplessis kick), 13:35. Tigers 28–21. Drive: 9 plays, 75 yards, 4:09.
- UTSA – Sincere McCormick 1-yard run (Hunter Duplessis kick), 10:30. Tied 28–28. Drive: 4 plays, 7 yards, 1:32.
- UTSA – Hunter Duplessis 42-yard field goal, 0:00. Roadrunners 31–28. Drive: 9 plays, 47 yards, 2:46.

Top passers

- UTSA – Frank Harris – 18/28, 186 yards, TD
- MEM – Seth Henigan – 15/25, 329 yards, TD

Top rushers

- UTSA – Sincere McCormick – 41 rushes, 184 yards, 3 TD
- MEM – Brandon Thomas – 20 rushes, 73 yards, TD

Top receivers

- UTSA – Joshua Cephus – 6 receptions, 82 yards
- MEM – Sean Dykes – 6 receptions, 167 yards

The Tigers scored 21 unanswered points in the 1st quarter, the first time all season that the Roadrunners trailed in a game. UTSA scored 17 unanswered points in the 4th quarter for the win. Hunter Duplessis nailed a 42-yard field goal as time expired to give the Roadrunners the win.

=== UNLV ===
UNLV Rebels at UTSA Roadrunners – Game summary

Quarter	1	2	3	4	Total
Rebels	7	3	0	7	17
Roadrunners	7	10	7	0	24

at Alamodome, San Antonio, Texas

- Date: October 2
- Game time: 5:00 p.m.
- Game weather: None (indoor stadium)
- Game attendance: 20,154
- Referee: Steve Brown
- TV announcers (ESPN+): Dough Anderson (play-by-play) and LaDarrin McLane (analyst)
- Box score, Recap

Game information

First quarter

- UTSA – Joshua Cephus 9-yard pass from Frank Harris (Hunter Duplessis kick), 4:48. Roadrunners 7–0. Drive: 14 plays, 92 yards, 5:13.
- UNLV – Steve Jenkins 63-yard pass from Cameron Friel (Daniel Gutierrez kick), 4:31. Tied 7–7. Drive: 1 play, 63 yards, 0:17.

Second quarter

- UNLV – Daniel Gutierrez 34-yard field goal, 9:00. Rebels 10–7. Drive: 14 plays, 76 yards, 8:06.
- UTSA – Hunter Duplessis 25-yard field goal, 6:32. Tied 10–10. Drive: 7 plays, 68 yards, 2:28.
- UTSA – Sincere McCormick 1-yard run (Hunter Duplessis kick), 0:21. Roadrunners 17–10. Drive: 12 plays, 49 yards, 4:01.

Third quarter

- UTSA – De'Corian Clark 31-yard pass from Frank Harris (Hunter Duplessis kick), 2:55. Roadrunners 24–10. Drive: 4 plays, 53 yards, 1:23.

Fourth quarter

- UNLV – Zyell Griffin 9-yard pass from Justin Rogers (Daniel Gutierrez kick), 6:46. Roadrunners 24–17. Drive: 15 plays, 80 yards, 6:43.

Top passers

- UNLV – Cameron Friel – 25/37, 307 yards, TD, 2 INT
- UTSA – Frank Harris – 24/30, 278 yards, 2 TD

Top rushers

- UNLV – Charles Williams – 15 rushes, 48 yards
- UTSA – Sincere McCormick – 29 rushes, 89 yards, TD

Top receivers

- UNLV – Steve Jenkins – 5 receptions, 114 yards, TD
- UTSA – De'Corian Clark – 7 receptions, 109 yards, TD

=== At Western Kentucky ===
UTSA Roadrunners at Western Kentucky Hilltoppers – Game summary

Quarter	1	2	3	4	Total
Roadrunners	14	14	14	10	52
Hilltoppers	10	14	13	9	46

at Houchens Industries–L. T. Smith Stadium, Bowling Green, Kentucky

- Date: October 9
- Game time: 6:00 p.m.
- Game weather: Temperature: 82 °F (28 °C) • Weather: Sunny and clear • Wind 5-10 MPH
- Game attendance: 15,243
- Referee: Kevin Randall
- TV announcers (Stadium): Chris Vosters (play-by-play) and Sed Bonner (analyst)
- Box score, Recap

Game information

First quarter

- UTSA – De'Corian Clark 30-yard pass from Frank Harris (Hunter Duplessis kick), 14:13. Roadrunners 7–0. Drive: 3 plays, 75 yards, 0:47.
- WKU – Brayden Narveson 34-yard field goal, 10:11. Roadrunners 7–3. Drive: 8 plays, 54 yards, 3:56.
- UTSA – Tykee Ogle-Kellogg 15-yard pass from Frank Harris (Hunter Duplessis kick), 5:03. Roadrunners 14–3. Drive: 14 plays, 75 yards, 5:08.
- WKU – Jerreth Sterns 3-yard pass from Bailey Zappe (Brayden Narveson kick), 0:49. Roadrunners 14–10. Drive: 12 plays, 58 yards, 4:04.

Second quarter

- WKU – Adam Cofield 10-yard run (Brayden Narveson kick), 11:22. Hilltoppers 17–14. Drive: 8 plays, 74 yards, 3:26.
- UTSA – Frank Harris 23-yard pass from Joshua Cephus (Hunter Duplessis kick), 8:25. Roadrunners 21–17. Drive: 8 plays, 75 yards, 2:57.
- WKU – Dalvin Smith 33-yard pass from Bailey Zappe (Brayden Narveson kick), 4:47. Hilltoppers 24–21. Drive: 9 plays, 82 yards, 3:32.
- UTSA – Oscar Cardenas 11-yard pass from Frank Harris (Hunter Duplessis kick), 0:40. Roadrunners 28–24. Drive: 3 plays, 32 yards, 0:32.

Third quarter

- WKU – Malachi Corley 24-yard pass from Bailey Zappe (Brayden Narveson kick), 12:46. Hilltoppers 31–28. Drive: 3 plays, 24 yards, 0:52.
- UTSA – De'Corian Clark 18-yard pass from Frank Harris (Hunter Duplessis kick), 10:38. Roadrunners 35–31. Drive: 6 plays, 75 yards, 2:08.
- UTSA – Joshua Cephus 3-yard pass from Frank Harris (Hunter Duplessis kick), 6:06. Roadrunners 42–31. Drive: 7 plays, 57 yards, 3:55.
- WKU – Mitchell Tinsley 40-yard pass from Bailey Zappe (run failed), 0:50. Roadrunners 42–37. Drive: 3 plays, 95 yards, 0:33.

Fourth quarter

- UTSA – Hunter Duplessis 35-yard field goal, 10:01. Roadrunners 45–37. Drive: 10 plays, 57 yards, 5:49.
- WKU – Jerreth Sterns 20-yard pass from Bailey Zappe (pass failed), 8:04. Roadrunners 45–43. Drive: 7 plays, 75 yards, 1:57.
- UTSA – De'Corian Clark 43-yard pass from Frank Harris (Hunter Duplessis kick), 6:39. Roadrunners 52–43. Drive: 4 plays, 75 yards, 1:25.
- WKU – Brayden Narveson 27-yard field goal, 4:22. Roadrunners 52–46. Drive: 10 plays, 66 yards, 2:17.

Top passers

- UTSA – Frank Harris – 28/38, 349 yards, 6 TD, INT
- WKU – Bailey Zappe – 38/60, 523 yards, 5 TD, INT

Top rushers

- UTSA – Sincere McCormick – 23 rushes, 120 yards
- WKU – Adam Cofield – 9 rushes, 65 yards, TD

Top receivers

- UTSA – De'Corian Clark – 7 receptions, 160 yards, 3 TD
- WKU – Jerreth Sterns – 16 receptions, 195 yards, 2 TD

Quarterback Frank Harris threw for six touchdowns, a school record, and caught a 23-yard pass for a touchdown.

=== Rice ===
Rice Owls at UTSA Roadrunners – Game summary

Quarter	1	2	3	4	Total
Owls	0	0	0	0	0
Roadrunners	17	14	14	0	45

at Alamodome, San Antonio, Texas

- Date: October 16
- Game time: 5:00 p.m.
- Game weather: None (indoor stadium)
- Game attendance: 27,515
- Referee: Rodney Burnette
- TV: ESPN+
- Box score, Recap

Game information

First quarter

- UTSA – Frank Harris 7-yard run (Hunter Duplessis kick), 10:58. Roadrunners 7–0. Drive: 9 plays, 75 yards, 4:02.
- UTSA – Hunter Duplessis 30-yard field goal, 4:28. Roadrunners 10–0. Drive: 12 plays, 55 yards, 4:44.
- UTSA – B. J. Daniels 11-yard run (Hunter Duplessis kick), 0:40. Roadrunners 17–0. Drive: 3 plays, 94 yards, 1:23.

Second quarter

- UTSA – Trevor Harmanson 40-yard interception return (Hunter Duplessis kick), 13:21. Roadrunners 24–0.
- UTSA – Joshua Cephus 2-yard pass from Frank Harris (Hunter Duplessis kick), 0:26. Roadrunners 31–0. Drive: 7 plays, 75 yards, 1:26.

Third quarter

- UTSA – Corey Mayfield Jr. 49-yard interception return (Hunter Duplessis kick), 13:06. Roadrunners 38–0.
- UTSA – Joshua Cephus 12-yard pass from Frank Harris (Hunter Dupkessis kick), 4:08. Roadrunners 45–0. Drive: 7 plays, 60 yards, 4:06.

Fourth quarter

- No scoring plays

Top passers

- RICE – Jake Constantine – 3/6, 21 yards, INT
- UTSA – Frank Harris – 12/19, 125 yards, 2 TD

Top rushers

- RICE – Ari Broussard – 10 rushes, 61 yards
- UTSA – Sincere McCormick – 13 rushes, 117 yards

Top receivers

- RICE – Cedric Patterson – 4 receptions, 19 yards
- UTSA – Joshua Cephus – 4 receptions, 63 yards, 2 TD

=== At Louisiana Tech ===
No. 24 UTSA Roadrunners at Louisiana Tech Bulldogs – Game summary

Quarter	1	2	3	4	Total
No. 24 Roadrunners	7	14	7	17	45
Bulldogs	10	0	0	6	16

at Joe Aillet Stadium, Ruston, Louisiana

- Date: October 23
- Game time: 6:00 p.m.
- Game weather: Sunny
- Game attendance: 18,314
- Referee: Jon Noli
- TV announcers (Stadium): Chris Hassel (play-by-play) and Patrick Murray (analyst)
- Box score, Recap

Game information

First quarter

- LT – Smoke Harris 47-yard pass from Austin Kendall (Jacob Barnes kick), 12:20. Bulldogs 7–0. Drive: 7 plays, 82 yards, 2:35.
- UTSA – Zakhari Franklin 75-yard pass from Frank Harris (Hunter Duplessis kick), 11:44. Tied 7–7. Drive: 3 plays, 75 yards, 0:36.
- LT – Jacob Barnes 35-yard field goal, 3:37. Bulldogs 10–7. Drive: 9 plays, 68 yards, 2:12.

Second quarter

- UTSA – Sincere McCormick 2-yard run (Hunter Duplessis kick), 14:22. Roadrunners 14–10. Drive: 16 plays, 75 yards, 4:10.
- UTSA – Zakhari Franklin 10-yard pass from Frank Harris (Hunter Duplessis kick), 3:12. Roadrunners 21–10. Drive: 12 plays, 72 yards, 4:28.

Third quarter

- UTSA – Dadrian Taylor 51-yard interception return (Hunter Duplessis kick), 12:44. Roadrunners 28–10.

Fourth quarter

- UTSA – Sincere McCormick 47-yard run (Hunter Duplessis kick), 13:46. Roadrunners 35–10. Drive: 5 plays, 87 yards, 1:36.
- UTSA – Sincere McCormick 1-yard run (Hunter Duplessis kick), 12:38. Roadrunners 42–10. Drive: 3 plays, 22 yards, 1:01.
- LT – Samuel Emilus 21-yard pass from Austin Kendall (pass failed), 9:31. Roadrunners 42–16. Drive: 8 plays, 75 yards, 3:07.
- UTSA – Hunter Duplessis 38-yard field goal, 1:06. Roadrunners 45–16. Drive: 7 plays, 36 yards, 4:12.

Top passers

- UTSA – Frank Harris – 12/19, 193 yards, 2 TD
- LT – Austin Kendall – 23/34, 279 yards, 2 TD, INT

Top rushers

- UTSA – Sincere McCormick – 23 rushes, 113 yards, 3 TD
- LT – Marcus Williams Jr. – 13 rushes, 66 yards

Top receivers

- UTSA – Zakhari Franklin – 5 receptions, 118 yards, 2 TD
- LT – Smoke Harris – 7 receptions, 108 yards, TD

=== At UTEP ===
UTSA Roadrunners at UTEP Miners – Game summary

Quarter	1	2	3	4	Total
Roadrunners	16	14	7	7	44
Miners	6	3	7	7	23

at Sun Bowl, El Paso, Texas

- Date: November 6
- Game time: 9:15 p.m. CDT / 8:15 p.m. MDT
- Game weather: Sunny
- Game attendance: 31,658
- Referee: Scott Hardin
- TV announcers (ESPN2): Clay Matvick (play-by-play), Rocky Boiman (analyst) and Tiffany Blackmon (sideline)
- Box score, Recap

Game information

First quarter

- UTSA – Sincere McCormick 75-yard run (Hunter Duplessis kick), 14:43. Roadrunners 7–0. Drive: 2 plays, 75 yards, 0:17.
- UTSA – Hunter Duplessis 51-yard field goal, 12:13. Roadrunners 10–0. Drive: 7 plays, 36 yards, 2:12.
- UTSA – Hunter Duplessis 41-yard field goal, 7:29. Roadrunners 13–0. Drive: 7 plays, 33 yards, 3:17.
- UTEP – Tyrin Smith 35-yard pass from Gavin Hardison (kick failed), 5:21. Roadrunners 13–6. Drive: 5 plays, 75 yards, 2:08.
- UTSA – Hunter Duplessis 33-yard field goal, 0:00. Roadrunners 16–6. Drive: 13 plays, 59 yards, 5:21.

Second quarter

- UTSA – Frank Harris 1-yard run (Hunter Duplessis kick), 5:03. Roadrunners 23–6. Drive: 10 plays, 80 yards, 3:53.
- UTSA – Zakhari Franklin 7-yard pass from Frank Harris (Hunter Duplessis kick), 0:27. Roadrunners 30–6. Drive: 9 plays, 80 yards, 2:16.
- UTEP – Gavin Baechle 50-yard field goal, 0:00. Roadrunners 30–9. Drive: 4 plays, 43 yards, 0:27.

Third quarter

- UTSA – Zakhari Franklin 7-yard pass from Frank Harris (Hunter Duplessis kick), 4:13. Roadrunners 37–9. Drive: 13 plays, 96 yards, 4:22.
- UTEP – Tyrin Smith 42-yard pass from Gavin Hardison (Gavin Baechle kick), 0:28. Roadrunners 37–16. Drive: 8 plays, 79 yards, 3:45.

Fourth quarter

- UTSA – Frank Harris 3-yard run (Hunter Duplessis kick), 10:45. Roadrunners 44–16. Drive: 8 plays, 75 yards, 4:43.
- UTEP – Justin Garrett 7-yard pass from Gavin Hardison (Gavin Baechle kick), 6:42. Roadrunners 44–23. Drive: 11 plays, 75 yards, 4:03.

Top passers

- UTSA – Frank Harris – 22/34, 286 yards, 2 TD
- UTEP – Gavin Hardison – 13/30, 247 yards, 3 TD

Top rushers

- UTSA – Sincere McCormick – 21 rushes, 161 yards, TD
- UTEP – Ronald Awatt – 16 rushes, 83 yards

Top receivers

- UTSA – Zakhari Franklin – 10 receptions, 114 yards, 2 TD
- UTEP – Jacob Cowing – 5 receptions, 112 yards

=== Southern Miss ===
Southern Miss Golden Eagles at No. 23 UTSA Roadrunners – Game summary

Quarter	1	2	3	4	Total
Golden Eagles	0	10	7	0	17
No. 23 Roadrunners	0	10	7	10	27

at Alamodome, San Antonio, Texas

- Date: November 13
- Game time: 2:30 p.m.
- Game weather: None (indoor stadium)
- Game attendance: 30,105
- Referee: Rodney Burnette
- TV announcers (ESPN+): Lincoln Rose (play-by-play) and LaDarrin McLane (analyst)
- Box score, Recap

Game information

First quarter

- No scoring plays

Second quarter

- UTSA – Hunter Duplessis 23-yard field goal, 13:00. Roadrunners 3–0. Drive: 6 plays, 40 yards, 1:39.
- USM – Frank Gore Jr. 9-yard run (Briggs Bourgeois kick), 10:32. Golden Eagles 7–3. Drive: 4 plays, 18 yards, 2:28.
- USM – Briggs Bourgeois 36-yard field goal, 2:19. Golden Eagles 10–3. Drive: 11 plays, 49 yards, 6:16.
- UTSA – Joshua Cephus 40-yard pass from Frank Harris (Hunter Duplessis kick), 1:12. Tied 10–10. Drive: 4 plays, 75 yards, 0:58.

Third quarter

- USM – Natrone Brooks 34-yard interception return (Briggs Bourgeois kick), 14:13. Golden Eagles 17–10.
- UTSA – Leroy Watson 24-yard pass from Frank Harris (Hunter Duplessis kick), 0:00. Tied 17–17. Drive: 8 plays, 58 yards, 3:00.

Fourth quarter

- UTSA – Hunter Duplessis 24-yard field goal, 4:39. Roadrunners 20–17. Drive: 6 plays, 28 yards, 2:00.
- UTSA – Sincere McCormick 9-yard run (Hunter Duplessis kick), 4:19. Roadrunners 27–17. Drive: 1 play, 9 yards, 0:06.

Top passers

- USM – Frank Gore Jr. – 2/3, 33 yards
- UTSA – Frank Harris – 17/30, 227 yards, 2 TD, 2 INT

Top rushers

- USM – Frank Gore Jr. – 20 rushes, 123 yards, TD
- UTSA – Sincere McCormick – 19 rushes, 90 yards, TD

Top receivers

- USM – Jason Brownlee – 3 receptions, 51 yards
- UTSA – Joshua Cephus – 8 receptions, 106 yards, TD

=== UAB ===
UAB Blazers at No. 22 UTSA Roadrunners – Game summary

Quarter	1	2	3	4	Total
Blazers	14	10	0	7	31
No. 22 Roadrunners	7	10	10	7	34

at Alamodome, San Antonio, Texas

- Date: November 20
- Game time: 2:30 p.m.
- Game weather: None (indoor stadium)
- Game attendance: 35,147
- Referee: Kevin Randall
- TV announcers (ESPN+): Doug Anderson (play-by-play) and LaDarrin McLane (analyst)
- Box score, Recap

Game information

First quarter

- UAB – Trea Shropshire 74-yard pass from Dylan Hopkins (Matt Quinn kick), 14:08. Blazers 7–0. Drive: 2 plays, 75 yards, 0:52.
- UTSA – Zakhari Franklin 15-yard pass from Frank Harris (Hunter Duplessis kick), 4:16. Tied 7–7. Drive: 12 plays, 73 yards, 4:43.
- UAB – Trea Shropshire 40-yard pass from Dylan Hopkins (Matt Quinn kick), 0:08. Blazers 14–7. Drive: 7 plays, 77 yards, 4:08.

Second quarter

- UTSA – Sincere McCormick 8-yard run (Hunter Duplessis kick), 10:24. Tied 14–14. Drive: 11 plays, 75 yards, 4:44.
- UAB – Dylan Hopkins 8-yard run (Matt Quinn kick), 5:41. Blazers 21–14. Drive: 8 plays, 75 yards, 4:43.
- UTSA – Hunter Duplessis 51-yard field goal, 2:18. Blazers 21–17. Drive: 7 plays, 42 yards, 3:23.
- UAB – Matt Quinn 23-yard field goal, 0:00. Blazers 24–17. Drive: 9 plays, 69 yards, 2:18.

Third quarter

- UTSA – Zakhari Franklin 54-yard pass from Frank Harris (Hunter Duplessis kick), 14:09. Tied 24–24. Drive: 3 plays, 75 yards, 0:51.
- UTSA – Hunter Duplessis 49-yard field goal, 1:21. Roadrunners 27–24. Drive: 6 plays, 13 yards, 1:57.

Fourth quarter

- UAB – DeWayne McBride 16-yard run (Matt Quinn kick), 5:19. Blazers 31–27. Drive: 6 plays, 44 yards, 3:30.
- UTSA – Oscar Cardenas 1-yard pass from Frank Harris (Hunter Duplessis kick), 0:03. Roadrunners 34–31. Drive: 7 plays, 77 yards, 1:03.

Top passers

- UAB – Dylan Hopkins – 15/22, 254 yards, 2 TD, INT
- UTSA – Frank Harris – 25/36, 323 yards, 3 TD

Top rushers

- UAB – DeWayne McBride – 24 rushes, 144 yards, TD
- UTSA – Sincere McCormick – 20 rushes, 65 yards, TD

Top receivers

- UAB – Trea Shropshire – 3 receptions, 130 yards, 2 TD
- UTSA – De'Corian Clark – 6 receptions, 104 yards

=== At North Texas ===
No. 22 UTSA Roadrunners at North Texas Mean Green – Game summary

Quarter	1	2	3	4	Total
No. 22 Roadrunners	3	10	0	10	23
Mean Green	17	14	14	0	45

at Apogee Stadium, Denton, Texas

- Date: November 27
- Game time: 1:00 p.m.
- Game weather: Temperature: 54 °F (12 °C) • Weather: Rain
- Game attendance: 16,933
- Referee: Rodney Burnette
- TV announcers (ESPN+): Kyle Youmans (play-by-play) and Hek’ma Harrison (analyst)
- Box score, Recap

Game information

First quarter

- UNT – Ethan Mooney 34-yard field goal, 12:09. Mean Green 3–0. Drive: 7 plays, 58 yards, 2:51.
- UNT – DeAndre Torrey 2-yard run (Ethan Mooney kick), 10:13. Mean Green 10–0. Drive: 4 plays, 26 yards, 1:47.
- UTSA – Hunter Duplessis 29-yard field goal, 5:05. Mean Green 10–3. Drive: 5 plays, 23 yards, 2:08.
- UNT – DeAndre Torrey 4-yard run (Ethan Mooney kick), 0:32. Mean Green 17–3. Drive: 4 plays, 15 yards, 1:44.

Second quarter

- UTSA – Hunter Duplessis 27-yard field goal, 10:23. Mean Green 17–6. Drive: 14 plays, 65 yards, 5:09.
- UTSA – Frank Harris 69-yard run (Hunter Duplessis kick), 8:20. Mean Green 17–13. Drive: 2 plays, 69 yards, 0:24.
- UNT – Ikaika Ragsdale 15-yard run (Ethan Mooney kick), 5:17. Mean Green 24–13. Drive: 8 plays, 77 yards, 2:55.
- UNT – DeAndre Torrey 19-yard run (Ethan Mooney kick), 3:04. Mean Green 31–13. Drive: 2 plays, 25 yards, 0:52.

Third quarter

- UNT – Ikaika Ragsdale 10-yard run (Ethan Mooney kick), 7:52. Mean Green 38–13. Drive: 13 plays, 70 yards, 5:53.
- UNT – Ayo Adeyi 42-yard run (Ethan Mooney kick), 3:52. Mean Green 45–13. Drive: 5 plays, 57 yards, 2:28.

Fourth quarter

- UTSA – Hunter Duplessis 42-yard field goal, 8:35. Mean Green 45–16. Drive: 12 plays, 72 yards, 4:11.
- UTSA – Tre'Von Bradley 67-yard pass from Eddie Lee Marburger (Hunter Duplessis kick), 2:48. Mean Green 45–23. Drive: 3 plays, 79 yards, 0:59.

Top passers

- UTSA – Eddie Lee Marburger – 2/4, 74 yards, TD
- UNT – Austin Aune – 10/17, 116 yards

Top rushers

- UTSA – Frank Harris – 10 rushes, 97 yards, TD
- UNT – Ikaika Ragsdale – 20 rushes, 146 yards, 2 TD

Top receivers

- UTSA – Tre'Von Bradley – 1 reception, 67 yards, TD
- UNT – Khatib Lyles – 3 receptions, 50 yards

=== Western Kentucky (C-USA Championship game) ===
Western Kentucky Hilltoppers at UTSA Roadrunners (C-USA Championship game) – Game summary

Quarter	1	2	3	4	Total
Hilltoppers	10	3	13	15	41
Roadrunners	14	14	14	7	49

at Alamodome, San Antonio, Texas

- Date: December 3
- Game time: 6:00 p.m.
- Game weather: None (indoor stadium)
- Game attendance: 41,148
- Referee: Kevin Randall
- TV announcers (CBSSN): Rich Waltz (play-by-play), Aaron Taylor (analyst) and Jenny Dell (sideline)
- Box score, Recap

Game information

First quarter

- WKU – Mitchell Tinsley 60-yard pass from Bailey Zappe (Brayden Narveson kick), 14:04. Hilltoppers 7–0. Drive: 5 plays, 78 yards, 0:56.
- UTSA – Frank Harris 24-yard run (Hunter Duplessis kick), 11:49. Tied 7–7. Drive: 7 plays, 75 yards, 2:15.
- WKU – Brayden Narveson 33-yard field goal, 10:07. Hilltoppers 10–7. Drive: 6 plays, 51 yards, 1:42.
- UTSA – Sincere McCormick 2-yard run (Hunter Duplessis kick), 4:59. Roadrunners 14–10. Drive: 14 plays, 75 yards, 5:08.

Second quarter

- WKU – Brayden Narveson 34-yard field goal, 14:57. Roadrunners 14–13. Drive: 15 plays, 59 yards, 5:02.
- UTSA – Brenden Brady 6-yard run (Hunter Duplessis kick), 11:50. Roadrunners 21–13. Drive: 9 plays, 75 yards, 3:07.
- UTSA – Sincere McCormick 65-yard run (Hunter Duplessis kick), 9:10. Roadrunners 28–13. Drive: 1 play, 65 yards, 0:11.

Third quarter

- UTSA – Zakhari Franklin 14-yard pass from Frank Harris (Hunter Duplessis kick), 11:13. Roadrunners 35–13. Drive: 2 plays, 14 yards, 0:45.
- UTSA – Sincere McCormick 17-yard run (Hunter Duplessis kick), 10:16. Roadrunners 42–13. Drive: 1 play, 17 yards, 0:08.
- WKU – Mitchell Tinsley 12-yard pass from Bailey Zappe (Brayden Narveson kick), 8:17. Roadrunners 42–20. Drive: 8 plays, 66 yards, 1:59.
- WKU – Jerreth Sterns 13-yard pass from Bailey Zappe (pass failed), 3:01. Roadrunners 42–26. Drive: 7 plays, 53 yards, 2:17.

Fourth quarter

- WKU – Kye Robichaux 1-yard run (Bailey Zappe pass to Jerreth Sterns), 11:01. Roadrunners 42–34. Drive: 5 plays, 71 yards, 1:10.
- UTSA – De'Corian Clark 28-yard pass from Frank Harris (Hunter Duplessis kick), 6:18. Roadrunners 49–34. Drive: 10 plays, 75 yards, 4:43.
- WKU – Jerreth Sterns 34-yard pass from Bailey Zappe (Brayden Narveson kick), 3:58. Roadrunners 49–41. Drive: 9 plays, 72 yards, 2:20.

Top passers

- WKU – Bailey Zappe – 36/59, 577 yards, 4 TD, 2 INT
- UTSA – Frank Harris – 19/28, 218 yards, 2 TD

Top rushers

- WKU – Noah Whittington – 4 rushes, 15 yards
- UTSA – Sincere McCormick – 36 rushes, 204 yards, 3 TD

Top receivers

- WKU – Jerreth Sterns – 10 receptions, 179 yards, 2 TD
- UTSA – Zakhari Franklin – 6 receptions, 67 yards, TD

=== Vs. No. 24 San Diego State (Frisco Bowl) ===
UTSA Roadrunners vs. No. 24 San Diego State Aztecs (Frisco Bowl) – Game summary

Quarter	1	2	3	4	Total
Roadrunners	14	0	10	0	24
No. 24 Aztecs	7	10	14	7	38

at Toyota Stadium, Frisco, Texas

- Date: December 21
- Game time: 6:30 p.m.
- Game weather: Temperature: 56 °F (13 °C) • Weather: Sunny • Wind: NW 6 MPH
- Game attendance: 15,801
- Referee: Ron Hudson
- TV announcers (ESPN): Clay Matvick (play-by-play), Rocky Boiman (analyst) and Tiffany Blackmon (sideline)

Game information

First quarter

- UTSA – De'Chorian Clark 12-yard pass from Frank Harris (Hunter Duplessis kick), 12:36. Roadrunners 7–0. Drive: 7 plays, 75 yards, 2:24.
- SDSU – Jesse Matthews 20-yard pass from Lucas Johnson (Matt Araiza kick), 5:09. Tied 7–7. Drive: 6 plays, 64 yards, 2:03.
- UTSA – Brenden Brady 2-yard run (Hunter Duplessis kick), 2:02. Roadrunners 14–7. Drive: 8 plays, 75 yards, 3:07.

Second quarter

- SDSU – Jesse Matthews 11-yard pass from Lucas Johnson (Matt Araiza kick), 9:14. Tied 14–14. Drive: 9 plays, 54 yards, 4:18.
- SDSU – Matt Araiza 33-yard field goal, 0:00. Aztecs 17–14. Drive: 10 plays, 74 yards, 1:56.

Third quarter

- SDSU – Greg Bell 1-yard run (Matt Araiza kick), 11:59. Aztecs 24–14. Drive: 6 plays, 48 yards, 3:01.
- UTSA – Hunter Duplessis 41-yard field goal, 10:09. Aztecs 24–17. Drive: 6 plays, 51 yards, 1:50.
- SDSU – Tyrell Shavers 24-yard pass from Lucas Johnson (Matt Araiza kick), 2:39. Aztecs 31–17. Drive: 6 plays, 69 yards, 2:58.
- UTSA – Zakhari Franklin 3-yard pass from Frank Harris (Hunter Duplessis kick), 0:00. Aztecs 31–24. Drive: 8 plays, 75 yards, 2:39.

Fourth quarter

- SDSU – Lucas Johnson 2-yard run (Mark Araiza kick), 9:51. Aztecs 38–24. Drive: 9 plays, 65 yards, 5:09.

Top passers

- UTSA – Frank Harris – 22/36, 271 yards, 2 TD, INT
- SDSU – Lucas Johnson – 24/36, 333 yards, 3 TD

Top rushers

- UTSA – Brenden Brady – 16 rushes, 76 yards, TD
- SDSU – Greg Bell – 26 rushes, 101 yards, TD

Top receivers

- UTSA – Zakhari Franklin – 8 receptions, 89 yards, TD
- SDSU – Jesse Matthews – 11 receptions, 175 yards, 2 TD

== Rankings ==
The Roadrunners received votes from both national polls after a win against Memphis. It marked the second time in program history, being recognized in the AP Poll.

Ranking movements Legend: ██ Increase in ranking ██ Decrease in ranking — = Not ranked RV = Received votes
	Week															
Poll	Pre	1	2	3	4	5	6	7	8	9	10	11	12	13	14	Final
AP	—	—	—	—	RV	RV	RV	24	23	16	15	15	15	RV	24	RV
Coaches	—	—	RV	RV	RV	RV	RV	25	22	18	16	18	20	RV	25	RV
CFP	Not released									—	23	22	22	—	—	Not released
