= 2021 Frisco Bowl =

Postseason college football bowl game

2021 Tropical Smoothie Cafe Frisco Bowl
- 4th Frisco Bowl
UTSA Roadrunners	San Diego State Aztecs
(12–1)	(11–2)
C-USA	MWC
24	38
Head coach: Jeff Traylor	Head coach: Brady Hoke
AP / Coaches / CFP; 24 / 25 / NR	AP / Coaches / CFP; NR / NR / 24
	1	2	3	4	Total
UTSA	14	0	10	0	24
San Diego State	7	10	14	7	38
- Date: December 21, 2021
- Season: 2021
- Stadium: Toyota Stadium
- Location: Frisco, Texas
- MVP: Off: Jesse Matthews (WR, SDSU); Def: CJ Baskerville (S, SDSU)
- Favorite: UTSA by 2.5
- Referee: Ron Hudson (MAC)
- Attendance: 15,801
- Payout: US$$650,000

United States TV coverage
- Network: ESPN
- Announcers: Clay Matvick (play-by-play), Rocky Boiman (analyst), and Tiffany Blackmon (sideline)

The 2021 Frisco Bowl was a college football bowl game played on December 21, 2021, with kickoff at 7:30 p.m. EST (6:30 p.m. local CST) on ESPN. It was the 4th edition of the Frisco Bowl (after the 2020 edition was cancelled due to the COVID-19 pandemic), and was one of the 2021–22 bowl games concluding the 2021 FBS football season. Sponsored by restaurant franchise Tropical Smoothie Cafe, the game was officially known as the Tropical Smoothie Cafe Frisco Bowl.

== Teams ==
Consistent with conference tie-ins, the game was played between teams from the Group of Five conferences.

This was the first time that San Diego State and UTSA had played each other.

=== UTSA Roadrunners ===
The Roadrunners, from Conference USA (C-USA), finished the regular season with a record of 11–1, 7–1 in conference play. The team won the West Division, advancing to the C-USA Championship Game, defeating Western Kentucky 49–41 for the program's first conference championship. UTSA entered the game ranked no. 24 in the AP Poll and no. 25 in the Coaches Poll. The team was led by second year head coach Jeff Traylor.

=== San Diego State Aztecs ===
The Aztecs, from the Mountain West Conference (MW), finished the regular season with a record of 11–1, 7–1 in conference play. The Aztecs won the West Division and made the MW Championship Game, losing 13–46 to Utah State. The team entered the game ranked no. 24 in the CFP poll. The Aztecs were led by head coach Brady Hoke.

== Game summary ==
2021 Tropical Smoothie Cafe Frisco Bowl

Quarter	1	2	3	4	Total
UTSA	14	0	10	0	24
No. 24 San Diego State	7	10	14	7	38

at Toyota Stadium • Frisco, Texas

- Date: Tuesday, December 21, 2021
- Game time: 7:30 p.m. EST (6:30 p.m. local CST)
- Game weather: Sunny • Temperature: 56 °F (13 °C) • Wind: 6 mph (9.7 km/h) NW
- Game attendance: 15,801
- TV announcers (ESPN): Clay Matvick (play-by-play), Rocky Boiman (analyst), and Tiffany Blackmon (sideline)
- Box score

Game information

First quarter

- 12:36 UTSA – De'Corian Clark 12-yard pass from Frank Harris, Hunter Duplessis kick good. Drive: 7 plays, 75 yards, 2:24. UTSA 7–0
- 5:09 SDSU – Jesse Matthews 20-yard pass form Lucas Johnson, Matt Araiza kick good. Drive: 6 plays, 64 yards, 2:03. tied 7–7
- 2:02 UTSA – Brenden Brady 2-yard run, Hunter Duplessis kick good. Drive: 8 plays, 75 yards, 3:07. UTSA 14–7

Second quarter

- 9:14 SDSU – Jesse Matthews 11-yard pass form Lucas Johnson, Matt Araiza kick good. Drive: 9 plays, 54 yards, 4:18. tied 14–14
- 0:00 SDSU – Matt Araiza 33-yard field goal. Drive: 10 plays, 74 yards, 1:55. San Diego State 17–14

Third quarter

- 11:59 SDSU – Greg Bell 1-yard run, Matt Araiza kick good. Drive: 6 plays, 48 yards, 3:01. San Diego State 24–14
- 10:09 UTSA – Hunter Duplessis 41-yard field goal. Drive: 6 plays, 51 yards, 1:50. San Diego State 24–17
- 2:39 SDSU – Tyrell Shavers 24-yard pass form Lucas Johnson, Matt Araiza kick good. Drive: 6 plays, 69 yards, 2:58. San Diego State 31–17
- 0:00 UTSA – Zakhari Franklin 3-yard pass from Frank Harris, Hunter Duplessis kick good. Drive: 8 plays, 75 yards, 2:39. San Diego State 31–24

Fourth quarter

- 9:51 SDSU – Lucas Johnson 2-yard run, Matt Araiza kick good. Drive: 10 plays, 65 yards, 5:09. San Diego State 38–24

=== Statistics ===
Statistics	UTSA	SDSU
First downs	21	32
Plays–yards	388	489
Rushes–yards	117	156
Passing yards	271	333
Passing: comp–att–int	22–38–1	24–36–0
Time of possession	22:09	37:34

Team	Category	Player	Statistics
UTSA	Passing	Frank Harris	22/36, 271 yards, 2 TD, 1 INT
UTSA	Rushing	Brenden Brady	16 carries, 76 yards, 1 TD
UTSA	Receiving	Zakhari Franklin	8 receptions, 89 yards, 1 TD
San Diego State	Passing	Lucas Johnson	24/36, 333 yards, 3 TD
San Diego State	Rushing	Greg Ball	26 carries, 101 yards, 1 TD
San Diego State	Receiving	Jesse Matthews	11 receptions, 175 yards, 2 TD

== See also ==
- 2021 Frisco Football Classic, played at the same venue two days later
