= 2021 NCAA Division I FBS football rankings =

- Season: 2021
- Bowl season: 2021–22 bowl games
- Preseason No. 1: Alabama
- End of season champions: Georgia
- Conference with most teams in final AP poll: SEC (5)

Human polls and a committee's selections comprise the 2021 National Collegiate Athletic Association (NCAA) Division I Football Bowl Subdivision (FBS) football rankings, in addition to various publications' preseason polls. Unlike most sports, college football's governing body, the NCAA, does not bestow a national championship at the FBS level. Instead, that title is bestowed by one or more different polling agencies. There are two main weekly polls that begin in the preseason—the AP Poll and the Coaches Poll. One additional poll, the College Football Playoff (CFP) ranking, is usually released starting midway through the season. The CFP rankings determine who makes the four-team playoff that determines the College Football Playoff National Champion.

== Legend ==
	Increase in ranking
	Decrease in ranking
	Not ranked previous week
	Selected for College Football Playoff
(#–#)	Win–loss record
(Italics)	Number of first place votes
т	Tied with team above or below also with this symbol

== AP Poll ==
	Preseason Aug 16	Week 1 Sep 7	Week 2 Sep 12	Week 3 Sep 19	Week 4 Sep 26	Week 5 Oct 3	Week 6 Oct 10	Week 7 Oct 17	Week 8 Oct 24	Week 9 Oct 31	Week 10 Nov 7	Week 11 Nov 14	Week 12 Nov 21	Week 13 Nov 28	Week 14 Dec 5	Week 15 (Final) Jan 11	
1.	Alabama (47)	Alabama (1–0) (59)	Alabama (2–0) (60)	Alabama (3–0) (59)	Alabama (4–0) (58)	Alabama (5–0) (53)	Georgia (6–0) (62)	Georgia (7–0) (63)	Georgia (7–0) (63)	Georgia (8–0) (63)	Georgia (9–0) (63)	Georgia (10–0) (62)	Georgia (11–0) (62)	Georgia (12–0) (62)	Alabama (12–1) (50)	Georgia (14–1) (61)	1.
2.	Oklahoma (6)	Georgia (1–0) (3)	Georgia (2–0) (2)	Georgia (3–0) (3)	Georgia (4–0) (4)	Georgia (5–0) (9)	Iowa (6–0)	Cincinnati (6–0)	Cincinnati (7–0)	Cincinnati (8–0)	Cincinnati (9–0)	Alabama (9–1)	Ohio State (10–1)	Michigan (11–1)	Michigan (12–1) (9)	Alabama (13–2)	2.
3.	Clemson (6)	Ohio State (1–0)	Oklahoma (2–0)	Oregon (3–0)	Oregon (4–0)	Iowa (5–0)	Cincinnati (6–0)	Oklahoma (7–0)	Alabama (7–1)	Alabama (7–1)	Alabama (8–1)	Cincinnati (10–0)	Alabama (10–1)	Cincinnati (12–0)	Georgia (12–1)	Michigan (12–2)	3.
4.	Ohio State (1)	Oklahoma (1–0)	Oregon (2–0)	Oklahoma (3–0)	Penn State (4–0)	Penn State (5–0)	Oklahoma (6–0)	Alabama (6–1)	Oklahoma (8–0)	Oklahoma (9–0)	Oklahoma (9–0)	Oregon (9–1)	Cincinnati (11–0)	Alabama (11–1)	Cincinnati (13–0) (3)	Cincinnati (13–1)	4.
5.	Georgia (3)	Texas A&M (1–0)	Iowa (2–0)	Iowa (3–0)	Iowa (4–0)	Cincinnati (4–0)	Alabama (5–1)	Ohio State (5–1)	Ohio State (6–1)	Michigan State (8–0)	Oregon (8–1)	Ohio State (9–1)	Notre Dame (10–1)	Oklahoma State (11–1)	Notre Dame (11–1)	Baylor (12–2)	5.
6.	Texas A&M	Clemson (0–1)	Clemson (1–1)	Penn State (3–0)	Oklahoma (4–0)	Oklahoma (5–0)	Ohio State (5–1)	Michigan (6–0)	Michigan (7–0)	Ohio State (7–1)	Ohio State (8–1)	Notre Dame (9–1)	Michigan (10–1)	Notre Dame (11–1)	Baylor (11–2)	Ohio State (11–2)	6.
7.	Iowa State	Cincinnati (1–0)	Texas A&M (2–0)	Texas A&M (3–0)	Cincinnati (3–0)	Ohio State (4–1)	Penn State (5–1)	Penn State (5–1)	Oregon (6–1)	Oregon (7–1)	Notre Dame (8–1)	Michigan State (9–1)	Oklahoma State (10–1)	Ohio State (10–2)	Ohio State (10–2)	Oklahoma State (12–2)	7.
8.	Cincinnati	Notre Dame (1–0)	Cincinnati (2–0)	Cincinnati (3–0)	Arkansas (4–0)	Oregon (4–1)	Michigan (6–0)	Oklahoma State (6–0)	Michigan State (7–0)	Notre Dame (7–1)	Michigan State (8–1)	Michigan (9–1)	Ole Miss (9–2)	Ole Miss (10–2)	Ole Miss (10–2)	Notre Dame (11–2)	8.
9.	Notre Dame	Iowa State (1–0)	Ohio State (1–1)	Clemson (2–1)	Notre Dame (4–0)	Michigan (5–0)	Oregon (4–1)	Michigan State (7–0)	Iowa (6–1)	Michigan (7–1)	Michigan (8–1)	Oklahoma State (9–1)	Baylor (9–2)	Baylor (10–2)	Oklahoma State (11–2)	Michigan State (11–2)	9.
10.	North Carolina	Iowa (1–0)	Penn State (2–0)	Ohio State (2–1)	Florida (3–1)	BYU (5–0)	Michigan State (6–0)	Oregon (5–1)	Ole Miss (6–1)	Wake Forest (8–0)	Oklahoma State (8–1)	Ole Miss (8–2)	Oklahoma (10–1)	Oregon (10–2)	Utah (10–3)	Oklahoma (11–2)	10.
11.	Oregon	Penn State (1–0)	Florida (2–0)	Florida (2–1)	Ohio State (3–1)	Michigan State (5–0)	Kentucky (6–0)	Iowa (6–1)	Notre Dame (6–1)	Oklahoma State (7–1)	Texas A&M (7–2)	Baylor (8–2)	Oregon (9–2)	Michigan State (10–2)	Michigan State (10–2)	Ole Miss (10–3)	11.
12.	Wisconsin	Oregon (1–0)	Notre Dame (2–0)	Notre Dame (3–0)	Ole Miss (3–0)	Oklahoma State (5–0)	Oklahoma State (5–0)	Ole Miss (5–1)	Kentucky (6–1)	Auburn (6–2)	Ole Miss (7–2)	Oklahoma (9–1)	Michigan State (9–2)	BYU (10–2)	BYU (10–2)	Utah (10–4)	12.
13.	Florida	Florida (1–0)	UCLA (2–0)	Ole Miss (3–0)	BYU (4–0)	Arkansas (4–1)	Ole Miss (4–1)	Notre Dame (5–1)	Wake Forest (7–0)	Texas A&M (6–2)	Wake Forest (8–1)	Wake Forest (9–1)	BYU (9–2)	Oklahoma (10–2)	Pittsburgh (11–2)	Pittsburgh (11–3)	13.
14.	Miami (FL)	USC (1–0)	Iowa State (1–1)	Iowa State (2–1)	Michigan (4–0)	Notre Dame (4–1)	Notre Dame (5–1)	Coastal Carolina (6–0)	Texas A&M (6–2)	Baylor (7–1)	BYU (8–2)	BYU (8–2)	Texas A&M (8–3)	Utah (9–3)	Oklahoma (10–2)	Clemson (10–3)	14.
15.	USC	Texas (1–0)	Virginia Tech (2–0)	BYU (3–0)	Texas A&M (3–1)	Coastal Carolina (5–0)	Coastal Carolina (6–0)	Kentucky (6–1)	Oklahoma State (6–1)	Ole Miss (6–2)	UTSA (9–0)	UTSA (10–0)	UTSA (11–0)	Iowa (10–2)	Oregon (10–3)	Wake Forest (11–3)	15.
16.	LSU	UCLA (2–0)	Coastal Carolina (2–0)	Arkansas (3–0)	Coastal Carolina (4–0)	Kentucky (5–0)	Wake Forest (6–0)	Wake Forest (6–0)	Baylor (6–1)	UTSA (8–0)	Auburn (6–3)	Texas A&M (7–3)	Utah (8–3)	Houston (11–1)	Louisiana (12–1)	Louisiana (13–1)	16.
17.	Indiana	Coastal Carolina (1–0)	Ole Miss (2–0)	Coastal Carolina (3–0)	Michigan State (4–0)	Ole Miss (3–1)	Arkansas (4–2)	Texas A&M (5–2)	Pittsburgh (6–1)	BYU (7–2)	Houston (8–1)	Houston (9–1)	Iowa (9–2)	Pittsburgh (10–2)	Iowa (10–3)	Houston (12–2)	17.
18.	Iowa	Wisconsin (0–1)	Wisconsin (1–1)	Wisconsin (1–1)	Fresno State (4–1)	Auburn (4–1)	Arizona State (5–1)	NC State (5–1)	Auburn (5–2)	Kentucky (6–2)	Baylor (7–2)	Iowa (8–2)	Wisconsin (8–3)	Wake Forest (10–2)	NC State (9–3)	Kentucky (10–3)	18.
19.	Penn State	Virginia Tech (1–0)	Arizona State (2–0)	Michigan (3–0)	Oklahoma State (4–0)	Wake Forest (5–0)	BYU (5–1)	Auburn (5–2)	SMU (7–0)	Iowa (6–2)	Iowa (7–2)	Wisconsin (7–3)	Houston (10–1)	San Diego State (11–1)	Clemson (9–3)	BYU (10–3)	19.
20.	Washington	Ole Miss (1–0)	Arkansas (2–0)	Michigan State (3–0)	UCLA (3–1)	Florida (3–2)	Florida (4–2)	Baylor (6–1)	Penn State (5–2)	Houston (7–1)	Wisconsin (6–3)	Pittsburgh (8–2)	Pittsburgh (9–2)	Louisiana (11–1)	Wake Forest (10–3)	NC State (9–3)	20.
21.	Texas	Utah (1–0)	North Carolina (1–1)	North Carolina (2–1)	Baylor (4–0)	Texas (4–1)	Texas A&M (4–2)	SMU (6–0)	San Diego State (7–0)	Coastal Carolina (7–1)	NC State (7–2)	Arkansas (7–3)	Wake Forest (9–2)	NC State (9–3)	Houston (11–2)	Arkansas (9–4)	21.
22.	Coastal Carolina	Miami (FL) (0–1)	Auburn (2–0)	Fresno State (3–1)	Auburn (3–1)	Arizona State (4–1)	NC State (4–1)	San Diego State (6–0)	Iowa State (5–2)	Penn State (5–3)	Coastal Carolina (8–1)	Louisiana (9–1)	San Diego State (10–1)	Clemson (9–3)	Arkansas (8–4)	Oregon (10–4)	22.
23.	Louisiana	Arizona State (1–0)	BYU (2–0)	Auburn (2–1)	NC State (3–1)	NC State (4–1)	SMU (6–0)	Pittsburgh (5–1)	UTSA (8–0)	SMU (7–1)	Penn State (6–3)	San Diego State (9–1)	Louisiana (10–1)	Arkansas (8–4)	Texas A&M (8–4)	Iowa (10–4)	23.
24.	Utah	North Carolina (0–1)	Miami (FL) (1–1)	UCLA (2–1)	Wake Forest (4–0)	SMU (5–0)	San Diego State (5–0)	UTSA (7–0)	Coastal Carolina (6–1)	Louisiana (7–1)	Louisiana (8–1)	Utah (7–3)	NC State (8–3)	Texas A&M (8–4)	UTSA (12–1)	Utah State (11–3)	24.
25.	Arizona State	Auburn (1–0)	Michigan (2–0)	Kansas State (3–0)	Clemson (2–2)	San Diego State (4–0)	Texas (4–2)	Purdue (4–2)	BYU (6–2)	Fresno State (7–2)	Pittsburgh (7–2)	NC State (7–3)	Arkansas (7–4)	Kentucky (9–3)	Kentucky (9–3)	San Diego State (12–2)	25.
	Preseason Aug 16	Week 1 Sep 7	Week 2 Sep 12	Week 3 Sep 19	Week 4 Sep 26	Week 5 Oct 3	Week 6 Oct 10	Week 7 Oct 17	Week 8 Oct 24	Week 9 Oct 31	Week 10 Nov 7	Week 11 Nov 14	Week 12 Nov 21	Week 13 Nov 28	Week 14 Dec 5	Week 15 (Final) Jan 11	
		Dropped: LSU; Indiana; Washington; Louisiana	Dropped: USC; Texas; Utah	Dropped: Virginia Tech; Arizona State; Miami (FL)	Dropped: Iowa State; Wisconsin; North Carolina; Kansas State	Dropped: Texas A&M; Fresno State; UCLA; Baylor; Clemson	Dropped: Auburn	Dropped: Arkansas; Arizona State; BYU; Florida; Texas	Dropped: NC State; Purdue	Dropped: Pittsburgh; San Diego State; Iowa State	Dropped: Kentucky; SMU; Fresno State	Dropped: Auburn; Coastal Carolina; Penn State	None	Dropped: UTSA; Wisconsin	Dropped: San Diego State	Dropped: Texas A&M; UTSA	

=== Ranking highlights ===
Preseason

- Iowa State received its highest ranking (No. 7) in program history.
- Coastal Carolina and Louisiana, respectively No. 22 and No. 23, were the first Sun Belt Conference teams ever ranked in the preseason.

Week 5

- Clemson's long streak of poll rankings ends.

Week 6

- Cincinnati received its highest ranking (No. 3) in program history.

Week 7

- UTSA was ranked for the first time in program history at No. 24.
- Cincinnati received its highest ranking (No. 2) in program history.

Week 8

- UTSA received its highest ranking (No. 23) in program history.

Week 9

- Wake Forest received its highest ranking (No. 10) in program history.
- UTSA received its highest ranking (No. 16) in program history.

Week 10

- UTSA received its highest ranking (No. 15) in program history.

Final Poll

- Cincinnati received its highest final ranking (No. 4). Its previous high was No. 8 in 2009 and 2020.
- Baylor received its highest final ranking (No. 5). Its previous high was No. 7 in 2014.
- Wake Forest received its highest final ranking (No. 15). Its previous high was No. 18 in 2006.

== Coaches Poll ==
	Preseason Aug 10	Week 1 Sep 7	Week 2 Sep 12	Week 3 Sep 19	Week 4 Sep 26	Week 5 Oct 3	Week 6 Oct 10	Week 7 Oct 17	Week 8 Oct 24	Week 9 Oct 31	Week 10 Nov 7	Week 11 Nov 14	Week 12 Nov 21	Week 13 Nov 28	Week 14 Dec 5	Week 15 (Final) Jan 11	
1.	Alabama (63)	Alabama (1–0) (64)	Alabama (2–0) (64)	Alabama (3–0) (64)	Alabama (4–0) (64)	Alabama (5–0) (63)	Georgia (6–0) (64)	Georgia (7–0) (65)	Georgia (7–0) (64)	Georgia (8–0) (64)	Georgia (9–0) (64)	Georgia (10–0) (62)	Georgia (11–0) (62)	Georgia (12–0) (62)	Alabama (12–1) (54)	Georgia (14–1) (62)	1.
2.	Clemson	Georgia (1–0) (1)	Georgia (2–0) (1)	Georgia (3–0) (1)	Georgia (4–0) (1)	Georgia (5–0) (2)	Iowa (6–0) (1)	Oklahoma (7–0)	Cincinnati (7–0)	Cincinnati (8–0)	Alabama (8–1)	Alabama (9–1)	Alabama (10–1)	Alabama (11–1)	Michigan (12–1) (5)	Alabama (13–2)	2.
3.	Oklahoma (2)	Ohio State (1–0)	Oklahoma (2–0)	Oklahoma (3–0)	Oregon (4–0)	Iowa (5–0)	Oklahoma (6–0)	Cincinnati (7–0)	Alabama (7–1)	Alabama (7–1)	Cincinnati (9–0)	Cincinnati (10–0)	Ohio State (10–1)	Michigan (11–1)	Georgia (12–1)	Michigan (12–2)	3.
4.	Ohio State	Oklahoma (1–0)	Oregon (2–0)	Oregon (3–0)	Oklahoma (4–0)	Penn State (5–0)	Cincinnati (5–0)	Alabama (6–1)	Oklahoma (8–0)	Oklahoma (9–0)	Oklahoma (9–0)	Ohio State (9–1)	Cincinnati (11–0)	Cincinnati (12–0)	Cincinnati (13–0) (3)	Cincinnati (13–1)	4.
5.	Georgia	Texas A&M (1–0)	Texas A&M (2–0)	Texas A&M (3–0)	Iowa (4–0)	Oklahoma (5–0)	Alabama (5–1)	Ohio State (5–1)	Ohio State (6–1)	Ohio State (7–1)	Ohio State (8–1)	Oregon (9–1)	Notre Dame (10–1)	Oklahoma State (11–1)	Notre Dame (11–1)	Ohio State (11–2)	5.
6.	Texas A&M	Clemson (0–1)	Clemson (1–1)	Iowa (3–0)	Penn State (4–0)	Cincinnati (4–0)	Ohio State (5–1)	Michigan (6–0)	Michigan (7–0)	Michigan State (8–0)	Oregon (8–1)	Notre Dame (8–1)	Michigan (10–1)	Notre Dame (11–1)	Baylor (11–2)	Baylor (12–2)	6.
7.	Notre Dame	Notre Dame (1–0)	Iowa (2–0)	Clemson (2–1)	Notre Dame (4–0)	Ohio State (4–1)	Michigan (6–0)	Michigan State (7–0)	Michigan State (7–0)	Oregon (7–1)	Notre Dame (8–1)	Michigan (9–1)	Oklahoma State (10–1)	Ohio State (10–2)	Ohio State (10–2)	Oklahoma State (12–2)	7.
8.	Iowa State	Cincinnati (1–0)	Cincinnati (2–0)	Penn State (3–0)	Cincinnati (3–0)	Michigan (5–0)	Penn State (5–1)	Penn State (5–1)	Oregon (6–1)	Notre Dame (7–1)	Michigan (8–1)	Michigan State (9–1)	Ole Miss (9–2)	Ole Miss (10–2)	Ole Miss (10–2)	Michigan State (11–2)	8.
9.	North Carolina	Florida (1–0)	Florida (2–0)	Cincinnati (3–0)	Florida (3–1)	Oregon (4–1)	Michigan State (6–0)	Oklahoma State (6–0)	Ole Miss (6–1)	Wake Forest (8–0)	Michigan State (8–1)	Oklahoma State (9–1)	Oklahoma (10–1)	Baylor (10–2)	Oklahoma State (11–2)	Notre Dame (11–2)	9.
10.	Cincinnati	Iowa State (1–0)	Notre Dame (2–0)	Notre Dame (3–0)	Ohio State (3–1)	BYU (5–0)	Oregon (4–1)	Oregon (5–1)	Iowa (6–1)	Michigan (7–1)	Oklahoma State (8–1)	Ole Miss (8–2)	Baylor (9–2)	Oregon (10–2)	Michigan State (10–2)	Oklahoma (11–2)	10.
11.	Florida	Oregon (1–0)	Ohio State (1–1)	Florida (2–1)	Arkansas (4–0)	Michigan State (5–0)	Kentucky (6–0)	Iowa (6–1)	Notre Dame (6–1)	Oklahoma State (7–1)	Texas A&M (7–2)	Oklahoma (9–1)	Oregon (9–2)	Oklahoma (10–2)	Utah (10–3)	Ole Miss (10–3)	11.
12.	Oregon	Iowa (1–0)	Penn State (2–0)	Ohio State (2–1)	Ole Miss (3–0)	Oklahoma State (5–0)	Oklahoma State (5–0)	Ole Miss (5–1)	Kentucky (6–1)	Texas A&M (6–2)	Ole Miss (7–2)	Wake Forest (9–1)	Iowa (9–2)	Iowa (10–2)	Pittsburgh (11–2)	Utah (10–4)	12.
13.	LSU	Penn State (1–0)	UCLA (2–0)	Ole Miss (3–0)	Texas A&M (3–1)	Notre Dame (4–1)	Notre Dame (5–1)	Notre Dame (5–1)	Wake Forest (7–0)	Baylor (7–1)	Wake Forest (8–1)	Baylor (8–2)	Michigan State (9–2)	Michigan State (10–2)	Oklahoma (10–2)	Pittsburgh (11–3)	13.
14.	USC	USC (1–0)	Iowa State (1–1)	Iowa State (2–1)	Michigan (4–0)	Kentucky (5–0)	Ole Miss (4–1)	Kentucky (6–1)	Texas A&M (6–2)	Auburn (6–2)	Iowa (7–2)	Iowa (8–2)	Texas A&M (8–3)	BYU (10–2)	BYU (10–2)	Wake Forest (11–3)	14.
15.	Wisconsin	Texas (1–0)	Virginia Tech (2–0)	Wisconsin (1–1)	BYU (4–0)	Coastal Carolina (5–0)	Coastal Carolina (6–0)	Wake Forest (6–0)	Oklahoma State (6–1)	Ole Miss (6–2)	BYU (8–2)	BYU (8–2)	BYU (9–2)	Pittsburgh (10–2)	Oregon (10–3)	Kentucky (10–3)	15.
16.	Miami (FL)	UCLA (2–0)	Ole Miss (2–0)	BYU (3–0)	Michigan State (4–0) т	Arkansas (4–1)	Wake Forest (6–0)	Coastal Carolina (6–0)	SMU (7–0)	Iowa (6–2)	UTSA (9–0)	Texas A&M (7–3)	Houston (10–1)	Houston (11–1)	Iowa (10–3)	Clemson (10–3)	16.
17.	Indiana	Wisconsin (0–1)	Wisconsin (1–1)	Coastal Carolina (3–0)	Coastal Carolina (4–0) т	Ole Miss (3–1)	Florida (4–2)	Texas A&M (5–2)	Penn State (5–2)	Kentucky (6–2)	Houston (8–1)	Houston (9–1)	Pittsburgh (9–2)	Utah (9–3)	Louisiana (12–1)	Houston (12–2)	17.
18.	Iowa	Utah (1–0)	Coastal Carolina (2–0)	Arkansas (3–0)	Oklahoma State (4–0)	Florida (3–2)	Texas A&M (4–2)	NC State (5–1)	Baylor (6–1)	UTSA (8–0)	Baylor (7–2)	UTSA (10–0)	Wisconsin (8–3)	Wake Forest (10–2)	NC State (9–3)	Louisiana (13–1)	18.
19.	Texas	Coastal Carolina (1–0)	North Carolina (1–1)	Michigan (3–0)	Clemson (2–2)	Auburn (4–1)	Arkansas (4–2)	SMU (6–0)	Pittsburgh (6–1)	Houston (7–1)	NC State (7–2)	Pittsburgh (8–2)	Utah (8–3)	San Diego State (11–1)	Wake Forest (10–3)	NC State (9–3)	19.
20.	Penn State	Ole Miss (1–0)	Auburn (2–0)	North Carolina (2–1)	UCLA (3–1)	Wake Forest (5–0)	BYU (5–1)	Baylor (6–1)	San Diego State (7–0)	BYU (7–2)	Auburn (6–3)	Wisconsin (7–3)	UTSA (11–0)	NC State (9–3)	Kentucky (9–3)	Arkansas (9–4)	20.
21.	Washington	Virginia Tech (1–0)	Arizona State (2–0)	Michigan State (3–0)	Fresno State (4–1)	Clemson (3–2)	NC State (4–1)	San Diego State (6–0)	Auburn (5–2)	Coastal Carolina (7–1)	Coastal Carolina (8–1)	Louisiana (9–1)	Wake Forest (9–2)	Louisiana (11–1)	Houston (11–2)	Oregon (10–4)	21.
22.	Oklahoma State	North Carolina (0–1)	Oklahoma State (2–0)	Oklahoma State (3–0)	Auburn (3–1)	NC State (4–1)	Arizona State (5–1)	Auburn (5–2)	UTSA (8–0)	NC State (6–2)	Pittsburgh (7–2)	Arkansas (7–3)	San Diego State (10–1)	Kentucky (9–3)	Clemson (9–3)	BYU (10–3)	22.
23.	Louisiana	Oklahoma State (1–0)	BYU (2–0)	Auburn (2–1)	Kentucky (4–0)	Texas (4–1)	SMU (6–0)	Pittsburgh (5–1)	Iowa State (5–2)	Penn State (5–3)	Penn State (6–3)	San Diego State (9–1)	Louisiana (10–1)	Texas A&M (8–4)	Texas A&M (8–4)	Iowa (10–4)	23.
24.	Coastal Carolina	Miami (FL) (0–1)	Arkansas (2–0)	UCLA (2–1)	Baylor (4–0)	SMU (5–0)	San Diego State (5–0)	Clemson (4–2)	Coastal Carolina (6–1)	SMU (7–1)	Wisconsin (6–3)	NC State (7–3)	NC State (8–3)	Clemson (9–3)	Arkansas (8–4)	Utah State (11–3)	24.
25.	Ole Miss	Arizona State (1–0)	Michigan (2–0)	Fresno State (3–1)	Wake Forest (4–0)	Arizona State (4–1)	Clemson (3–2)	UTSA (7–0)	NC State (5–2)	Pittsburgh (6–2)	Louisiana (8–1)	Utah (7–3)	Kentucky (8–3)	Arkansas (8–4)	UTSA (12–1)	Texas A&M (8–4)	25.
	Preseason Aug 10	Week 1 Sep 7	Week 2 Sep 12	Week 3 Sep 19	Week 4 Sep 26	Week 5 Oct 3	Week 6 Oct 10	Week 7 Oct 17	Week 8 Oct 24	Week 9 Oct 31	Week 10 Nov 7	Week 11 Nov 14	Week 12 Nov 21	Week 13 Nov 28	Week 14 Dec 5	Week 15 (Final) Jan 11	
		Dropped: LSU; Indiana; Washington; Louisiana	Dropped: USC; Texas; Utah; Miami (FL)	Dropped: Virginia Tech; Arizona State	Dropped: Iowa State; Wisconsin; North Carolina	Dropped: Texas A&M; UCLA; Fresno State; Baylor	Dropped: Auburn; Texas	Dropped: Florida; Arkansas; BYU; Arizona State	Dropped: Clemson	Dropped: San Diego State; Iowa State	Dropped: Kentucky; SMU	Dropped: Auburn; Coastal Carolina; Penn State	Dropped: Arkansas	Dropped: Wisconsin; UTSA	Dropped: San Diego State	Dropped: UTSA	

== CFP rankings ==
The initial 2021 College Football Playoff rankings were released on Tuesday, November 2, 2021.

	Week 9 Nov. 2	Week 10 Nov. 9	Week 11 Nov. 16	Week 12 Nov. 23	Week 13 Nov. 30	Week 14 (Final) Dec. 5	
1.	Georgia (8–0)	Georgia (9–0)	Georgia (10–0)	Georgia (11–0)	Georgia (12–0)	Alabama (12–1)	1.
2.	Alabama (7–1)	Alabama (8–1)	Alabama (9–1)	Ohio State (10–1)	Michigan (11–1)	Michigan (12–1)	2.
3.	Michigan State (8–0)	Oregon (8–1)	Oregon (9–1)	Alabama (10–1)	Alabama (11–1)	Georgia (12–1)	3.
4.	Oregon (7–1)	Ohio State (8–1)	Ohio State (9–1)	Cincinnati (11–0)	Cincinnati (12–0)	Cincinnati (13–0)	4.
5.	Ohio State (7–1)	Cincinnati (9–0)	Cincinnati (10–0)	Michigan (10–1)	Oklahoma State (11–1)	Notre Dame (11–1)	5.
6.	Cincinnati (8–0)	Michigan (8–1)	Michigan (9–1)	Notre Dame (10–1)	Notre Dame (11–1)	Ohio State (10–2)	6.
7.	Michigan (7–1)	Michigan State (8–1)	Michigan State (9–1)	Oklahoma State (10–1)	Ohio State (10–2)	Baylor (11–2)	7.
8.	Oklahoma (9–0)	Oklahoma (9–0)	Notre Dame (9–1)	Baylor (9–2)	Ole Miss (10–2)	Ole Miss (10–2)	8.
9.	Wake Forest (8–0)	Notre Dame (8–1)	Oklahoma State (9–1)	Ole Miss (9–2)	Baylor (10–2)	Oklahoma State (11–2)	9.
10.	Notre Dame (7–1)	Oklahoma State (8–1)	Wake Forest (9–1)	Oklahoma (10–1)	Oregon (10–2)	Michigan State (10–2)	10.
11.	Oklahoma State (7–1)	Texas A&M (7–2)	Baylor (8–2)	Oregon (9–2)	Michigan State (10–2)	Utah (10–3)	11.
12.	Baylor (7–1)	Wake Forest (8–1)	Ole Miss (8–2)	Michigan State (9–2)	BYU (10–2)	Pittsburgh (11–2)	12.
13.	Auburn (6–2)	Baylor (7–2)	Oklahoma (9–1)	BYU (9–2)	Iowa (10–2)	BYU (10–2)	13.
14.	Texas A&M (6–2)	BYU (8–2)	BYU (8–2)	Wisconsin (8–3)	Oklahoma (10–2)	Oregon (10–3)	14.
15.	BYU (7–2)	Ole Miss (7–2)	Wisconsin (7–3)	Texas A&M (8–3)	Pittsburgh (10–2)	Iowa (10–3)	15.
16.	Ole Miss (6–2)	NC State (7–2)	Texas A&M (7–3)	Iowa (9–2)	Wake Forest (10–2)	Oklahoma (10–2)	16.
17.	Mississippi State (5–3)	Auburn (6–3)	Iowa (8–2)	Pittsburgh (9–2)	Utah (9–3)	Wake Forest (10–3)	17.
18.	Kentucky (6–2)	Wisconsin (6–3)	Pittsburgh (8–2)	Wake Forest (9–2)	NC State (9–3)	NC State (9–3)	18.
19.	NC State (6–2)	Purdue (6–3)	San Diego State (9–1)	Utah (8–3)	San Diego State (11–1)	Clemson (9–3)	19.
20.	Minnesota (6–2)	Iowa (7–2)	NC State (7–3)	NC State (8–3)	Clemson (9–3)	Houston (11–2)	20.
21.	Wisconsin (5–3)	Pittsburgh (7–2)	Arkansas (7–3)	San Diego State (10–1)	Houston (11–1)	Arkansas (8–4)	21.
22.	Iowa (6–2)	San Diego State (8–1)	UTSA (10–0)	UTSA (11–0)	Arkansas (8–4)	Kentucky (9–3)	22.
23.	Fresno State (7–2)	UTSA (9–0)	Utah (7–3)	Clemson (8–3)	Kentucky (9–3)	Louisiana (12–1)	23.
24.	San Diego State (7–1)	Utah (6–3)	Houston (9–1)	Houston (10–1)	Louisiana (11–1)	San Diego State (11–2)	24.
25.	Pittsburgh (6–2)	Arkansas (6–3)	Mississippi State (6–4)	Arkansas (7–4)	Texas A&M (8–4)	Texas A&M (8–4)	25.
	Week 9 Nov. 2	Week 10 Nov. 9	Week 11 Nov. 16	Week 12 Nov. 23	Week 13 Nov. 30	Week 14 (Final) Dec. 5	
		Dropped: Mississippi State; Kentucky; Minnesota; Fresno State	Dropped: Auburn; Purdue	Dropped: Mississippi State	Dropped: UTSA; Wisconsin	None	

== FWAA-NFF Super 16 Poll ==
The joint poll of the Football Writers Association of America and National Football Foundation is a human poll which the NCAA Football Bowl Subdivision Records book designates as being one of the "major selectors" of national championships. The NFF automatically awards its MacArthur Bowl National Championship Trophy to the winner of the College Football Playoff National Championship.

	Preseason Aug 18	Week 1 Sep 7	Week 2 Sep 12	Week 3 Sep 19	Week 4 Sep 26	Week 5 Oct 3	Week 6 Oct 10	Week 7 Oct 17	Week 8 Oct 24	Week 9 Oct 31	Week 10 Nov 7	Week 11 Nov 14	Week 12 Nov 21	Week 13 Nov 28	Week 14 (Final) Dec 5	
1.	Alabama (35)	Alabama (1–0) (46)	Alabama (2–0) (46)	Alabama (3–0) (46)	Alabama (4–0) (46)	Alabama (5–0) (39)	Georgia (6–0) (51)	Georgia (7–0) (52)	Georgia (7–0) (52)	Georgia (8–0) (52)	Georgia (9–0) (52)	Georgia (10–0) (52)	Georgia (11–0) (52)	Georgia (12–0) (52)	Alabama (12–1) (44)	1.
2.	Clemson (3)	Georgia (1–0) (6)	Georgia (2–0) (6)	Georgia (3–0) (6)	Georgia (4–0) (6)	Georgia (5–0) (13)	Iowa (6–0) (1)	Cincinnati (6–0)	Alabama (7–1)	Alabama (7–1)	Alabama (8–1)	Alabama (9–1)	Ohio State (10–1)	Michigan (11–1)	Michigan (12–1) (7)	2.
3.	Oklahoma (9)	Ohio State (1–0)	Oklahoma (2–0)	Oregon (3–0)	Oregon (4–0)	Iowa (5–0)	Cincinnati (5–0)	Oklahoma (7–0)	Cincinnati (7–0)	Cincinnati (8–0)	Oklahoma (9–0)	Oregon (9–1)	Alabama (10–1)	Alabama (11–1)	Georgia (12–1)	3.
4.	Ohio State (1)	Oklahoma (1–0)	Oregon (2–0)	Oklahoma (3–0)	Iowa (4–0)	Penn State (5–0)	Oklahoma (6–0)	Alabama (6–1)	Oklahoma (8–0)	Oklahoma (9–0)	Cincinnati (9–0)	Cincinnati (10–0)	Cincinnati (11–0)	Cincinnati (12–0)	Cincinnati (13–0) (1)	4.
5.	Georgia (4)	Texas A&M (1–0)	Clemson (2–0)	Iowa (3–0)	Penn State (4–0)	Cincinnati (4–0)	Alabama (5–1)	Ohio State (5–1)	Ohio State (6–1)	Michigan State (8–0)	Ohio State (8–1)	Ohio State (9–1)	Michigan (10–1)	Oklahoma State (11–1)	Notre Dame (11–1)	5.
6.	Texas A&M	Clemson (0–1)	Iowa (2–0)	Penn State (3–0)	Oklahoma (4–0)	Oklahoma (5–0)	Ohio State (5–1)	Michigan (6–0)	Michigan (7–0)	Ohio State (7–1)	Oregon (8–1)	Michigan State (9–1)	Notre Dame (10–1)	Notre Dame (11–1)	Baylor (11–2)	6.
7.	Iowa State	Notre Dame (1–0)	Texas A&M (2–0)	Texas A&M (3–0)	Cincinnati (3–0)	Michigan (5–0)	Michigan (6–0)	Michigan State (7–0)	Michigan State (7–0)	Oregon (7–1)	Notre Dame (8–1)	Michigan (9–1)	Oklahoma State (10–1)	Ohio State (10–2)	Ohio State (10–2)	7.
8.	Notre Dame	Cincinnati (1–0)	Cincinnati (2–0)	Clemson (2–1)	Notre Dame (4–0)	Ohio State (4–1)	Penn State (5–1)	Oklahoma State (6–0)	Oregon (6–1)	Notre Dame (7–1)	Michigan State (8–1)	Notre Dame (9–1)	Ole Miss (9–2)	Ole Miss (10–2)	Ole Miss (10–2)	8.
9.	North Carolina	Iowa State (1–0)	Ohio State (1–1)	Cincinnati (3–0)	Florida (3–1)	Oregon (4–1)	Kentucky (6–0)	Penn State (5–1)	Ole Miss (6–1)	Wake Forest (8–0)	Michigan (8–1)	Oklahoma State (9–1)	Oklahoma (10–1)	Baylor (10–2)	Oklahoma State (11–2)	9.
10.	Cincinnati	Penn State (1–0)	Penn State (2–0)	Ohio State (2–1)	Arkansas (4–0)	BYU (5–0)	Michigan State (6–0)	Oregon (5–1)	Iowa (6–1)	Michigan (7–1)	Oklahoma State (8–1)	Ole Miss (8–2)	Baylor (9–2)	Oregon (10–2)	Michigan State (10–2)	10.
11.	Oregon	Florida (1–0)	Florida (2–0)	Florida (2–1)	Ohio State (3–1)	Michigan State (5–0)	Oregon (4–1)	Iowa (6–1)	Notre Dame (6–1)	Oklahoma State (7–1)	Texas A&M (7–2)	Oklahoma (9–1)	Oregon (9–2)	Michigan State (10–2)	Utah (10–3)	11.
12.	Florida	Oregon (1–0)	Notre Dame (2–0)	Notre Dame (3–0)	Ole Miss (3–0)	Kentucky (5–0)	Oklahoma State (5–0)	Ole Miss (5–1)	Wake Forest (7–0)	Texas A&M (6–2)	Ole Miss (7–2)	Baylor (8–2)	Michigan State (9–2)	Oklahoma (10–2)	Pittsburgh (11–2)	12.
13.	Wisconsin	Iowa (1–0)	UCLA (2–0)	Ole Miss (3–0)	Michigan (4–0)	Oklahoma State (5–0)	Ole Miss (4–1)	Notre Dame (5–1)	Kentucky (6–1)	Baylor (7–1)	Wake Forest (8–1)	Wake Forest (9–1)	BYU (9–2)	BYU (10–2)	BYU (10–2)	13.
14.	LSU	USC (1–0)	Iowa State (1–1)	Iowa State (2–1)	BYU (4–0)	Notre Dame (4–1)	Notre Dame (5–1)	Kentucky (6–1)	Oklahoma State (6–1)	Auburn (6–2)	BYU (8–2)	BYU (8–2)	Texas A&M (8–3)	Iowa (10–2)	Oklahoma (10–2)	14.
15.	USC	UCLA (1–0)	Virginia Tech (2–0) т	Michigan (3–0)	Michigan State (4–0)	Arkansas (4–1)	Coastal Carolina (6–0)	Coastal Carolina (6–0)	Texas A&M (6–2)	Ole Miss (6–2)	UTSA (9–0)	UTSA (10–0)	UTSA (11–0)	Utah (9–3)	Oregon (10–3)	15.
16.	Miami (FL)	Texas (1–0)	Ole Miss (2–0) т	BYU (3–0)	Texas A&M (3–1)	Coastal Carolina (5–0)	Wake Forest (6–0)	Wake Forest (6–0)	Pittsburgh (6–1)	UTSA (8–0)	Iowa (7–2)	Texas A&M (7–3)	Wisconsin (8–3)	Pittsburgh (10–2)	Iowa (10–3)	16.
	Preseason Aug 18	Week 1 Sep 7	Week 2 Sep 12	Week 3 Sep 19	Week 4 Sep 26	Week 5 Oct 3	Week 6 Oct 10	Week 7 Oct 17	Week 8 Oct 24	Week 9 Oct 31	Week 10 Nov 7	Week 11 Nov 14	Week 12 Nov 21	Week 13 Nov 28	Week 14 (Final) Dec 5	
		Dropped: North Carolina (0–1); Wisconsin (0–1); LSU (0–1); Miami (FL) (0–1)	Dropped: USC (1–1); Texas (1–1)	Dropped: UCLA (2–1); Virginia Tech (2–1)	Dropped: Clemson (2–2); Iowa State (2–2)	Dropped: Florida (3–2); Ole Miss (3–1); Texas A&M (3–2)	Dropped: BYU (5–1); Arkansas (4–2)	None	Dropped: Penn State (5–2); Coastal Carolina (6–1)	Dropped: Iowa (6–2); Kentucky (6–2); Pittsburgh (6–2)	Dropped: Baylor (7–2); Auburn (6–3)	Dropped: Iowa (8–2)	Dropped: Wake Forest (9–2)	Dropped: Texas A&M (8–4); UTSA (11–1); Wisconsin (8–4)	None	
