= 2021 San Diego State Aztecs football team =

American college football season

2021 San Diego State Aztecs football

MW West Division champion Frisco Bowl champion

MW Championship Game, L 13–46 vs. Utah State

Frisco Bowl, W 38–24 vs. UTSA
- Conference: Mountain West Conference
- West Division

Ranking
- AP: No. 25
- Record: 12–2 (7–1 MW)
- Head coach: Brady Hoke (4th season)
- Offensive coordinator: Jeff Hecklinski (2nd season)
- Offensive scheme: Multiple
- Defensive coordinator: Kurt Mattix (2nd season)
- Base defense: 4–2–5
- Home stadium: Dignity Health Sports Park

2021 Mountain West Conference football standings
	Conf.			Overall
Team	W		L	W		L
Mountain Division
No. 24 Utah State xy$	6	–	2	11	–	3
Air Force x	6	–	2	10	–	3
Boise State	5	–	3	7	–	5
Wyoming	2	–	6	7	–	6
Colorado State	2	–	6	3	–	9
New Mexico	1	–	7	3	–	9
West Division
No. 25 San Diego State xy	7	–	1	12	–	2
Fresno State	6	–	2	10	–	3
Nevada	5	–	3	8	–	5
Hawaii	3	–	5	6	–	7
San Jose State	3	–	5	5	–	7
UNLV	2	–	6	2	–	10
Championship: Utah State 46, San Diego State 13
$ – Conference champion; x – Division champion/co-champions; y – Championship game participant; Rankings from AP Poll

The 2021 San Diego State Aztecs football team represented San Diego State University in the 2021 NCAA Division I FBS football season. The Aztecs were led by head coach Brady Hoke in the second season of his second stint as head coach and played their home games at Dignity Health Sports Park in Carson, California. They competed as members of the West Division of the Mountain West Conference.

== Schedule ==
Date	Time	Opponent	Rank	Site	TV	Result	Attendance
September 4	7:30 p.m.	New Mexico State*		Dignity Health Sports Park; Carson, CA	CBSSN	W 28–10	10,116
September 11	7:00 p.m.	at Arizona*		Arizona Stadium; Tucson, AZ	P12N	W 38–14	39,097
September 18	4:00 p.m.	Utah*		Dignity Health Sports Park; Carson, CA	CBSSN	W 33–31 ^{3OT}	11,090
September 25	12:30 p.m.	Towson*		Dignity Health Sports Park; Carson, CA	Stadium	W 48–21	7,619
October 9	6:00 p.m.	New Mexico	No. 25	Dignity Health Sports Park; Carson, CA	FS1	W 31–7	8,387
October 15	7:30 p.m.	at San Jose State	No. 24	CEFCU Stadium; San José, CA	CBSSN	W 19–13 ^{2OT}	17,177
October 23	4:00 p.m.	at Air Force	No. 22	Falcon Stadium; Colorado Springs, CO	CBSSN	W 20–14	23,887
October 30	7:30 p.m.	Fresno State	No. 21	Dignity Health Sports Park; Carson, CA (rivalry)	CBSSN	L 20–30	11,034
November 6	8:00 p.m.	at Hawaii	No. 24	Clarence T. C. Ching Athletics Complex; Honolulu, HI	FS1	W 17–10	6,239
November 13	7:30 p.m.	Nevada	No. 22	Dignity Health Sports Park; Carson, CA	CBSSN	W 23–21	11,821
November 19	8:30 p.m.	at UNLV	No. 19	Allegiant Stadium; Paradise, NV	CBSSN	W 28–20	16,713
November 26	9:00 a.m.	Boise State	No. 21	Dignity Health Sports Park; Carson, CA	CBS	W 27–16	11,886
December 4	12:00 p.m.	Utah State	No. 19	Dignity Health Sports Park; Carson, CA (Mountain West Conference Championship Game)	FOX	L 13–46	13,445
December 21	4:30 p.m.	vs. UTSA*	No. 24	Toyota Stadium; Frisco, TX (Frisco Bowl)	ESPN	W 38–24	15,801
*Non-conference game; Rankings from AP Poll (and CFP Rankings, after November 2) - Released prior to game; All times are in Pacific time

== Game summaries ==
=== New Mexico State ===
New Mexico State Aggies at San Diego State Aztecs

Quarter	1	2	3	4	Total
New Mexico State	3	7	0	0	10
San Diego State	0	0	21	7	28

at Dignity Health Sports Park • Carson, California

- Date: September 4, 2021
- Game time: 7:30 p.m. PDT
- Game weather: Sunny, 73 °F (23 °C)
- Game attendance: 10,116
- Referee: Baron Stephen
- TV announcers (CBSSN): Rich Waltz (play-by-play), Aaron Taylor (analysis), Lindsay Rhodes (sidelines), and Deb Boulac (producer)
- Aztec Football Tops New Mexico State, 28–10, Game Book

Game information

First quarter

- NMSU – Ethan Albertson 31 Yd Field Goal, 7:26. Aggies 3–0

Second quarter

- NMSU – Dominic Gicinto 8 Yd pass from Jonah Johnson (Ethan Albertson Kick), 10:42. Aggies 10–0

Third quarter

- SDSU – Greg Bell 23 Yd Run (Matt Araiza Kick), 13:43. Aggies 10–7
- SDSU – Jordon Brookshire 18 Yd Run (Matt Araiza Kick), 3:01. Aztecs 14–10
- SDSU – Andrew Aleki 25 Yd Interception Return (Matt Araiza Kick), 2:45. Aztecs 21–10

Fourth quarter

- SDSU – Jordan Byrd 43 Yd Run (Matt Araiza Kick), 14L19. Aztecs 28–10

Odds

- Line: SDSU –31.5
- Over/Under: 50.5

Statistics	NMSU	SDSU
First downs	21	17
Plays–yards	82–374	61–339
Rushes–yards	26–48	42–263
Passing yards	326	76
Passing: comp–att–int	34–56–3	6–19–1
Time of possession	33:42	26:18

Team	Category	Player	Statistics
NMSU	Passing	Jonah Johnson	34-56, 326 YDS, 1 TD, 3 INT
NMSU	Rushing	O'Maury Samuels	6 CAR, 35 YDS
NMSU	Receiving	Terrell Warner	10 REC, 79 YDS
SDSU	Passing	Jordon Brookshire	6-19, 76 YDS, 1 INT
SDSU	Rushing	Greg Bell	21 CAR, 161 YDS, 1 TD
SDSU	Receiving	Kobe Smith	1 REC, 24 YDS

=== At Arizona ===
San Diego State Aztecs at Arizona Wildcats

Quarter	1	2	3	4	Total
San Diego State	21	14	3	0	38
Arizona	7	0	0	7	14

at Arizona Stadium • Tucson, Arizona

- Date: September 11, 2021
- Game time: 7:00 p.m. PDT
- Game weather: Sunny
- Game attendance: 39,097
- Referee: Mike Cuttone
- TV announcers (P12N): Roxy Bernstein (play-by-play), Yogi Roth (analysis), and Michael Molinari (producer)
- Bear Down, Game Book

Game information

First quarter

- SDSU – Greg Bell 55 Yd Run (Matt Araiza Kick), 13:22. Aztecs 7–0. Drive: 4 plays, 75 yards, 1:38.
- SDSU – Jordon Brookshire 3 Yd Run (Matt Araiza Kick), 9:12. Aztecs 14–0. Drive: 6 plays, 96 yards, 3:08.
- SDSU – Tyrell Shavers 27 Yd Return of Blocked Punt (Matt Araiza Kick), 7:07. Aztecs 21–0. Drive: 3 plays, 6 yards, 2:05.
- ARIZ – Stanley Berryhill 43 Yd pass from Gunner Cruz (Tyler Loop Kick), 5:50. Aztecs 21–7. Drive: 4 plays, 75 yards, 1:17.

Second quarter

- SDSU – Daniel Bellinger 25 Yd pass from Jordon Brookshire (Matt Araiza Kick), 12:29. Aztecs 28–7. Drive: 7 plays, 78 yards, 3:35.
- SDSU – Ethan Dedeaux 40 Yd pass from Jordon Brookshire (Matt Araiza Kick), 1:52. Aztecs 35–7. Drive: 3 plays, 56 yards, 0:55.

Third quarter

- SDSU – Matt Araiza 32 Yd Field Goal, 5:13. Aztecs 38–7. Drive: 6 plays, 6 yards, 3:22.

Fourth quarter

- ARIZ – Tayvian Cunningham 7 Yd pass from Will Plummer (Tyler Loop Kick), 8:24. Aztecs 38–14. Drive: 11 plays, 80 yards, 2:52.

Odds

- Line: ARIZ –1.5
- Over/Under: 46.5
- ESPN FPI: SDSU 53.1%

Statistics	SDSU	ARIZ
First downs	21	9
Plays–yards	70–454	56–230
Rushes–yards	55–271	20–51
Passing yards	183	179
Passing: comp–att–int	10–15–0	18–36–1
Time of possession	37:34	22:26

Team	Category	Player	Statistics
SDSU	Passing	Jordon Brookshire	10-14, 183 YDS, 2 TD
SDSU	Rushing	Greg Bell	17 CAR, 125 YDS, 1 TD
SDSU	Receiving	Daniel Bellinger	3 REC, 113 YDS, 1 TD
ARIZ	Passing	Will Plummer	8-17, 109 YDS, 1 TD
ARIZ	Rushing	Stanley Berryhill	2 CAR, 26 YDS
ARIZ	Receiving	Tayvian Cunningham	5 REC, 81 YDS, 1 TD

=== Utah ===
Utah Utes at San Diego State Aztecs

Quarter	1	2	3	4	OT	2OT	3OT	Total
Utah	7	3	0	14	7	0	0	31
San Diego State	3	7	14	0	7	0	2	33

at Dignity Health Sports Park • Carson, California

- Date: September 18, 2021
- Game time: 4:00 p.m. PDT
- Game weather: Sunny, 69 °F (21 °C)
- Game attendance: 11,090
- Referee: Jim Wharrie
- TV announcers (CBSSN): Dave Ryan (play-by-play), Aaron Murray (analysis), Amanda Guerra (sidelines), and Giancarlo Gennarini (producer)
- Leading the Pac, Game Book

Game information

First quarter

- UTAH – Britain Covey 80 Yd Punt Return (Jadon Redding Kick), 8:02. Utes 7–0. Drive: 3 plays, -2 yards, 1:48.
- SDSU – Matt Araiza 51 Yd Field Goal, 1:54. Utes 7–3. Drive: 8 plays, 29 yards, 3:20.

Second quarter

- UTAH – Jadon Redding 43 Yd Field Goal, 7:51. Utes 10–3. Drive: 13 plays, 58 yards, 5:02.
- SDSU – Jordan Byrd 100 Yd Kickoff Return (Matt Araiza Kick), 7:38. Tie 10–10. Drive: 6 plays, 18 yards, 2:39.

Third quarter

- SDSU – Greg Bell 7 Yd Run (Matt Araiza Kick), 11:24. Aztecs 17–10. Drive: 8 plays, 82 yards, 3:31.
- SDSU – Greg Bell 7 Yd Run (Matt Araiza Kick), 10:42. Aztecs 24–10. Drive: 1 play, 7 yards, 0:04.

Fourth quarter

- UTAH – Britain Covey 2 Yd pass from Cameron Rising (Jadon Redding PAT failed), 4:17. Aztecs 24–16. Drive: 10 plays, 63 yards, 2:16.
- UTAH – Theo Howard 4 Yd pass from Cameron Rising (Cameron Rising Pass to Solomon Enis for Two-Point Conversion), 0:16. Tie 24–24. Drive: 13 plays, 74 yards, 2:20.

First overtime

- SDSU – Jay Rudolph 2 Yd pass from Lucas Johnson (Matt Araiza Kick). Aztecs 31–24.
- UTAH – Jaylen Dixon 25 Yd pass from Cameron Rising (Jadon Redding Kick). Tie 31–31.

Second overtime

- No scoring

Third overtime

- SDSU – Jesse Matthews Pass to Lucas Johnson for Two-Point Conversion. Aztecs 33–31. Drive: 1 play, 0 yards.

Odds

- Line: UTAH –8.0
- Over/Under: 42.5
- ESPN FPI: UTAH 59.8%

Statistics	UTAH	SDSU
First downs	21	12
Plays–yards	89–327	64–248
Rushes–yards	31–70	45–204
Passing yards	257	44
Passing: comp–att–int	33–58–1	10–19–0
Time of possession	30:19	29:41

Team	Category	Player	Statistics
UTAH	Passing	Cameron Rising	19-32, 153 YDS, 3 TD
UTAH	Rushing	Micah Bernard	17 CAR, 47 YDS
UTAH	Receiving	Brant Kuithe	7 REC, 58 YDS
SDSU	Passing	Lucas Johnson	10-19, 44 YDS, 1 TD
SDSU	Rushing	Greg Bell	33 CAR, 119 YDS, 2 TD
SDSU	Receiving	Daniel Bellinger	1 REC, 15 YDS

=== Towson ===
Towson Tigers at San Diego State Aztecs

Quarter	1	2	3	4	Total
Towson	7	7	0	7	21
San Diego State	7	14	24	3	48

at Dignity Health Sports Park • Carson, California

- Date: September 25, 2021
- Game time: 12:30 p.m. PDT
- Game weather: Hazy, 76 °F (24 °C)
- Game attendance: 7,619
- Referee: Christian Watson
- TV announcers (Stadium): Ari Wolfe (play-by-play), Jordan Palmer (analysis), and Andy Bock (producer)
- Aztecs Cruise Past Towson, 48–21, Game Book

Game information

First quarter

- TOW – Jerry Howard Jr. 19 Yd pass from Chris Ferguson (Keegan Vaughan Kick), 5:36. Tigers 7–0. Drive: 4 plays, 69 yards, 1:19.
- SDSU – Kaegun Williams 8 Yd Run (Matt Araiza Kick), 0:14. Tie 7–7. Drive: 5 plays, 15 yards, 2:04.

Second quarter

- SDSU – Jordan Byrd 12 Yd Run (Matt Araiza Kick), 7:56. Aztecs 14–7. Drive: 11 plays, 90 yards, 5:53.
- SDSU – Elijah Kothe 16 Yd pass from Lucas Johnson (Matt Araiza Kick), 4:03. Aztecs 21–7. Drive: 6 plays, 70 yards, 2:45.
- TOW – Caleb Smith 4 Yd pass from Chris Ferguson (Keegan Vaughan Kick), 0:06. Aztecs 21–14. Drive: 11 plays, 80 yards, 1:40.

Third quarter

- SDSU – Trenton Thompson 11 Yd Return of Blocked Punt (Matt Araiza Kick), 14:02. Aztecs 28–14. Drive: 3 plays, -1 yard, 0:58.
- SDSU – Jordan Byrd 55 Yd Run (Matt Araiza Kick), 10:43. Aztecs 35–14. Drive: 3 plays, 64 yards, 1:06.
- SDSU – Matt Araiza 48 Yd Field Goal, 6:39. Aztecs 38–14. Drive: 4 plays, 0 yards, 1:02.
- SDSU – Chance Bell 1 Yd Run (Matt Araiza Kick), 4:25. Aztecs 45–14. Drive: 4 plays, 64 yards, 1:15.

Fourth quarter

- SDSU – Matt Araiza 36 Yd Field Goal, 7:44. Aztecs 48–14. Drive: 17 plays, 64 yards, 10:31.
- TOW – Daniel Thompson IV 9 Yd pass from Chris Ferguson (Keegan Vaughan Kick), 5:59. Aztecs 48–21. Drive: 4 plays, 24 yards, 1:32.

Odds

- Line: SDSU –23.0
- Over/Under: 41.0
- ESPN FPI: SDSU 94.8%

Statistics	TOW	SDSU
First downs	12	24
Plays–yards	56–228	73–450
Rushes–yards	20–15	47–281
Passing yards	213	169
Passing: comp–att–int	19–36–1	17–26–1
Time of possession	21:50	38:10

Team	Category	Player	Statistics
TOW	Passing	Chris Ferguson	19-35, 213 YDS, 3 TD, 1 INT
TOW	Rushing	Jerry Howard Jr.	12 CAR, 19 YDS
TOW	Receiving	Caleb Smith	9 REC, 65 YDS, 1 TD
SDSU	Passing	Lucas Johnson	16-25, 149 YDS, 1 TD, 1 INT
SDSU	Rushing	Chance Bell	7 CAR, 79 YDS, 1 TD
SDSU	Receiving	Brionne Penny	4 REC, 55 YDS

=== New Mexico ===
New Mexico Lobos at No. 25 San Diego State Aztecs

Quarter	1	2	3	4	Total
New Mexico	0	0	7	0	7
No. 25 San Diego State	7	10	7	7	31

at Dignity Health Sports Park • Carson, California

- Date: October 9, 2021
- Game time: 6:00 p.m. PDT
- Game weather: Sunny, 69 °F (21 °C)
- Game attendance: 8,387
- Referee: Timothy Davis
- TV announcers (FS1): Alex Faust (play-by-play), Petros Papadakis (analysis), and Brad Weimer (producer)
- No. 25 Aztecs Roll Past New Mexico, 31–7, Game Book

Game information

First quarter

- SDSU – Greg Bell 1 Yd Run (Matt Araiza Kick), 11:21. Aztecs 7–0. Drive: 6 plays, 63 yards, 2:01.

Second quarter

- SDSU – Matt Araiza 40 Yd Field Goal, 14:57. Aztecs 10–0. Drive: 10 plays, 48 yards, 3:11.
- SDSU – Jordon Brookshire 1 Yd Run (Matt Araiza Kick), 4:35. Aztecs 17–0. Drive: 10 plays, 66 yards, 5:29.

Third quarter

- UNM – Ray Leutele 15 Yd Fumble Return (Andrew Shelley Kick), 4:41. Aztecs 17–7. Drive: 2 plays, 6 yards, 0:42.
- SDSU – Jordon Brookshire 11 Yd Run (Matt Araiza Kick), 2:35. Aztecs 24–7. Drive: 5 plays, 60 yards, 1:59.

Fourth quarter

- SDSU – Chance Bell 8 Yd Run (Matt Araiza Kick), 13:05. Aztecs 31–7. Drive: 6 plays, 66 yards, 2:52.

Odds

- Line: SDSU –19.5
- Over/Under: 42.5
- ESPN FPI: SDSU 96.9%

Statistics	UNM	SDSU
First downs	12	19
Plays–yards	61–193	68–336
Rushes–yards	34–66	43–203
Passing yards	127	133
Passing: comp–att–int	13–27–1	12–25–0
Time of possession	28:59	31:01

Team	Category	Player	Statistics
UNM	Passing	Terry Wilson	13-25, 127 YDS, 1 INT
UNM	Rushing	Aaron Dumas	11 CAR, 77 YDS
UNM	Receiving	Luke Wysong	4 REC, 51 YDS
SDSU	Passing	Jordon Brookshire	11-24, 130 YDS
SDSU	Rushing	Greg Bell	21 CAR, 111 YDS, 1 TD
SDSU	Receiving	Tyrell Shavers	2 REC, 39 YDS

=== At San Jose State ===
No. 24 San Diego State Aztecs at San Jose State Spartans

Quarter	1	2	3	4	OT	2OT	Total
No. 24 San Diego State	0	6	0	0	7	6	19
San Jose State	0	3	0	3	7	0	13

at CEFCU Stadium • San Jose, California

- Date: October 15, 2021
- Game time: 7:30 p.m. PDT
- Game weather: Sunny, 72 °F (22 °C)
- Game attendance: 17,177
- Referee: Mike Cuttone
- TV announcers (CBSSN): Rich Waltz (play-by-play), Aaron Taylor (analysis), Amanda Guerra (sidelines), and Giancarlo Gennarini (producer)
- 6–0, Game Book

Game information

First quarter

- No scoring

Second quarter

- SDSU – Matt Araiza 53 Yd Field Goal, 11:16. Aztecs 3–0. Drive: 5 plays, 11 yards, 1:58.
- SJSU – Matt Mercurio 32 Yd Field Goal, 8:17. Tie 3–3. Drive: 8 plays, 60 yards, 2:59.
- SDSU – Matt Araiza 26 Yd Field Goal, 0:54. Aztecs 6–3. Drive: 11 plays, 64 yards, 3:30.

Third quarter

- No scoring

Fourth quarter

- SJSU – Matt Mercurio 48 Yd Field Goal, 14:49. Tie 6–6. Drive: 11 plays, 66 yards, 5:16.

First overtime

- SDSU – Jesse Matthews 14 Yd pass from Lucas Johnson (Matt Araiza Kick). Aztecs 13–6.
- SJSU – Tyler Nevens 1 Yd Run (Matt Mercurio Kick). Tie 13–13.

Second overtime

- SDSU – Jesse Matthews 24 Yd pass from Lucas Johnson. Aztecs 19–13.

Odds

- Line: SDSU –9.5
- Over/Under: 41.0
- ESPN FPI: SDSU 78.0%

Statistics	SDSU	SJSU
First downs	17	18
Plays–yards	66–240	77–345
Rushes–yards	36–70	42–117
Passing yards	170	228
Passing: comp–att–int	15–30–0	16–35–1
Time of possession	27:39	32:21

Team	Category	Player	Statistics
SDSU	Passing	Jordon Brookshire	13-27, 132 YDS
SDSU	Rushing	Greg Bell	18 CAR, 43 YDS
SDSU	Receiving	Jesse Matthews	4 REC, 54 YDS, 2 TD
SJSU	Passing	Nick Nash	16-34, 228 YDS, 1 INT
SJSU	Rushing	Tyler Nevens	28 CAR, 74 YDS, 1 TD
SJSU	Receiving	Derrick Deese Jr.	6 REC, 113 YDS

=== At Air Force ===
No. 22 San Diego State Aztecs at Air Force Falcons

Quarter	1	2	3	4	Total
No. 22 San Diego State	3	10	7	0	20
Air Force	0	0	7	7	14

at Falcon Stadium • Colorado Springs, Colorado

- Date: October 23, 2021
- Game time: 4:00 p.m. PDT
- Game weather: Sunny
- Game attendance: 23,887
- Referee: Derek Anderson
- TV announcers (CBSSN): Rich Waltz (play-by-play), Aaron Taylor (analysis), Jenny Dell (sidelines), and Scott Brandwein (producer)
- Aztecs Improve to 7–0, Game Book

Game information

First quarter

- SDSU – Matt Araiza 22 Yd Field Goal, 12:26. Aztecs 3–0. Drive: 4 plays, 4 yards, 1:42.

Second quarter

- SDSU – Kaegun Williams 1 Yd Run (Matt Araiza Kick), 8:42. Aztecs 10–0. Drive: 12 plays, 42 yards, 5:45.
- SDSU – Matt Araiza 51 Yd Field Goal, 1:54. Aztecs 13–0. Drive: 7 plays, 12 yards, 4:27.

Third quarter

- SDSU – Chance Bell 3 Yd Run (Matt Araiza Kick), 11:05. Aztecs 20–0. Drive: 7 plays, 75 yards, 3:48.
- AFA – Dalton King 13 Yd pass from Warren Bryan (Matthew Dapore Kick), 1:07. Aztecs 20–7. Drive: 11 plays, 57 yards, 4:57.

Fourth quarter

- AFA – Dane Kinamon 3 Yd Run (Matthew Dapore Kick), 3:59. Aztecs 20–14. Drive: 15 plays, 89 yards, 6:33.

Odds

- Line: AFA –3.0
- Over/Under: 39.0
- ESPN FPI: AFA 53.8%

Statistics	SDSU	AFA
First downs	10	15
Plays–yards	52–229	63–259
Rushes–yards	39–157	48–192
Passing yards	72	67
Passing: comp–att–int	11–13–0	5–15–1
Time of possession	31:15	28:45

Team	Category	Player	Statistics
SDSU	Passing	Lucas Johnson	11-13, 72 YDS
SDSU	Rushing	Chance Bell	8 CAR, 50 YDS, 1 TD
SDSU	Receiving	Elijah Kothe	3 REC, 25 YDS
AFA	Passing	Warren Bryan	3-7, 58 YDS, 1 TD
AFA	Rushing	Haaziq Daniels	9 CAR, 50 YDS
AFA	Receiving	Jake Spiewak	1 REC, 31 YDS

=== Fresno State ===
60th Battle for the Old Oil Can: Fresno State Bulldogs at No. 21 San Diego State Aztecs

Quarter	1	2	3	4	Total
Fresno State	7	13	3	7	30
No. 21 San Diego State	0	7	6	7	20

at Dignity Health Sports Park • Carson, California

- Date: October 30, 2021
- Game time: 7:30 p.m. PDT
- Game weather: Cloudy, 60 °F (16 °C)
- Game attendance: 11,034
- Referee: Steve Baron
- TV announcers (CBSSN): Dave Ryan (play-by-play), Aaron Murray (analysis), Amanda Guerra (sidelines), and Carlos Gennarini (producer)
- San Diego State Suffers First Loss, Game Book

Game information

First quarter

- FRES – Jordan Mims 13 Yd Run (Cesar Silva Kick), 3:53. Bulldogs 7–0. Drive: 15 plays, 86 yards, 6:51.

Second quarter

- FRES – Keric Wheatfall 16 Yd pass from Jake Haener (Cesar Silva Kick), 14:17. Bulldogs 14–0. Drive: 4 plays, 31 yards, 1:38.
- FRES – Cesar Silva 49 Yd Field Goal, 9:04. Bulldogs 17–0. Drive: 5 plays, 60 yards, 2:49.
- FRES – Cesar Silva 27 Yd Field Goal, 4:32. Bulldogs 20–0. Drive: 7 plays, 75 yards, 2:48.
- SDSU – Tyrell Shavers 19 Yd pass from Lucas Johnson (Matt Araiza Kick), 2:15. Bulldogs 20–7. Drive: 6 plays, 82 yards, 2:12.

Third quarter

- FRES – Cesar Silva 42 Yd Field Goal, 4:00. Bulldogs 23–7. Drive: 7 plays, 24 yards, 2:24.
- SDSU – Greg Bell 3 Yd Run (Two-Point Pass Conversion Failed), 0:13. Bulldogs 23–13. Drive: 10 plays, 80 yards, 3:38.

Fourth quarter

- FRES – Jordan Mims 15 Yd Run (Cesar Silva Kick), 4:28. Bulldogs 30–13. Drive: 2 plays, 31 yards, 0:46.
- SDSU – William Haskell 7 Yd Run (Matt Araiza Kick), 1:06. Bulldogs 30–20. Drive: 11 plays, 75 yards, 3:22.

Odds

- Line: FRES –2.0
- Over/Under: 44.0
- ESPN FPI: SDSU 55.5%

Statistics	FRES	SDSU
First downs	24	23
Plays–yards	77–485	71–412
Rushes–yards	34–179	33–165
Passing yards	306	247
Passing: comp–att–int	25–43–0	17–38–2
Time of possession	32:58	27:02

Team	Category	Player	Statistics
FRES	Passing	Jake Haener	25-42, 306 YDS, 1 TD
FRES	Rushing	Jordan Mims	29 CAR, 186 YDS, 2 TD
FRES	Receiving	Josh Kelly	5 REC, 107 YDS
SDSU	Passing	Lucas Johnson	14-31, 220 YDS, 1 TD, 2 INT
SDSU	Rushing	Greg Bell	15 CAR, 63 YDS, 1 TD
SDSU	Receiving	Elijah Kothe	4 REC, 105 YDS

=== At Hawai'i ===
No. 24 San Diego State Aztecs at Hawai'i Rainbow Warriors

Quarter	1	2	3	4	Total
No. 24 San Diego State	7	7	0	3	17
Hawai'i	7	0	0	3	10

at Clarence T. C. Ching Athletics Complex • Honolulu

- Date: November 6, 2021
- Game time: 8:00 p.m. PDT
- Game weather: Temperature: 84 °F (29 °C) • Wind: ENE 15 miles per hour (24 km/h) • Weather: Humidity -53%
- Game attendance: 6,239
- Referee: C. Watson
- TV announcers (FS1): Dan Hellie (play-by-play), Robert Smith (analysis), and Zac Kinman (producer)
- Aztecs Win in Paradise, Game Book

Game information

First quarter

- SDSU – Greg Bell 5 Yd Run (Matt Araiza Kick), 6:27. Aztecs 7–0. Drive: 8 plays, 47 yards, 4:59.
- HAW – Calvin Turner 19 Yd pass from Chevan Cordeiro (Matthew Shipley Kick), 2:21. Tie 7–7. Drive: 1 play, 19 yards, 0:06.

Second quarter

- SDSU – Jack Browning 13 Yd Run (Matt Araiza Kick), 9:43. Aztecs 14–7. Drive: 15 plays, 82 yards, 7:33.

Third quarter

- No scoring

Fourth quarter

- SDSU – Matt Araiza 39 Yd Field Goal, 7:41. Aztecs 17–7. Drive: 14 plays, 57 yards, 8:26.
- HAW – Matthew Shipley 22 Yd Field Goal, 3:00. Aztecs 17–10. Drive: 15 plays, 70 yards, 4:41.

Odds

- Line: SDSU –7.0
- Over/Under: 45.5
- ESPN FPI: SDSU 70.7%

Statistics	SDSU	HAW
First downs	15	16
Plays–yards	59–227	65–260
Rushes–yards	43–128	30–85
Passing yards	99	175
Passing: comp–att–int	12–16–0	19–35–1
Time of possession	34:07	25:53

Team	Category	Player	Statistics
SDSU	Passing	Lucas Johnson	12-16, 99 YDS
SDSU	Rushing	Greg Bell	24 CAR, 77 YDS, 1 TD
SDSU	Receiving	Daniel Bellinger	5 REC, 41 YDS
HAW	Passing	Chevan Cordeiro	19-34, 175 YDS, 1 TD, 1 INT
HAW	Rushing	Dedrick Parson	11 CAR, 51 YDS
HAW	Receiving	Dedrick Parson	5 REC, 38 YDS

=== Nevada ===
Nevada Wolf Pack at No. 22 San Diego State Aztecs

Quarter	1	2	3	4	Total
Nevada	0	7	7	7	21
No. 22 San Diego State	7	3	7	6	23

at Dignity Health Sports Park • Carson, California

- Date: November 13, 2021
- Game time: 7:30 p.m. PST
- Game weather: Clear, 65 °F (18 °C)
- Game attendance: 11,821
- Referee: Timothy Davis
- TV announcers (CBSSN): Rich Waltz (play-by-play), Aaron Taylor (analysis), Jenny Dell (sidelines), and Deb Boulac (producer)
- California Grit, Game Book

Game information

First quarter

- SDSU – Daniel Bellinger 2 Yd pass from Lucas Johnson (Matt Araiza Kick), 3:42. Aztecs 7–0. Drive: 12 plays, 99 yards, 5:39.

Second quarter

- NEV – Tory Horton 28 Yd pass from Carson Strong (Brandon Talton Kick), 14:55. Tie 7–7. Drive: 8 plays, 85 yards, 3:41.
- SDSU – Matt Araiza 48 Yd Field Goal, 9:35. Aztecs 10–7. Drive: 9 plays, 36 yards, 5:11.

Third quarter

- SDSU – Chance Bell 5 Yd Run (Matt Araiza Kick), 9:31. Aztecs 17–7. Drive: 8 plays, 75 yards, 3:25.
- NEV – Romeo Doubs 5 Yd pass from Carson Strong (Brandon Talton Kick), 2:20. Aztecs 17–14. Drive: 9 plays, 80 yards, 2:46.

Fourth quarter

- SDSU – Matt Araiza 39 Yd Field Goal, 11:58. Aztecs 20–14. Drive: 7 plays, 15 yards, 2:48.
- NEV – Romeo Doubs 54 Yd pass from Carson Strong (Brandon Talton Kick), 9:57. Wolf Pack 21–20. Drive: 4 plays, 75 yards, 2:01.
- SDSU – Matt Araiza 35 Yd Field Goal, 1:21. Aztecs 23–20. Drive: 12 plays, 53 yards, 3:12.

Odds

- Line: SDSU –2.5
- Over/Under: 45.0
- ESPN FPI: SDSU 53.5%

Statistics	NEV	SDSU
First downs	19	20
Plays–yards	63–358	73–362
Rushes–yards	15–8	39–186
Passing yards	350	176
Passing: comp–att–int	34–48–0	21–34–0
Time of possession	26:32	33:28

Team	Category	Player	Statistics
NEV	Passing	Carson Strong	34-48, 350 YDS, 3 TD
NEV	Rushing	Toa Taua	9 CAR, 31 YDS
NEV	Receiving	Romeo Doubs	9 REC, 127 YDS, 2 TD
SDSU	Passing	Lucas Johnson	21-34, 176 YDS, 1 TD
SDSU	Rushing	Greg Bell	16 CAR, 104 YDS
SDSU	Receiving	Elijah Kothe	6 REC, 71 YDS

=== At UNLV ===
No. 19 San Diego State Aztecs at UNLV Rebels

Quarter	1	2	3	4	Total
No. 19 San Diego State	7	14	0	7	28
UNLV	3	7	10	0	20

at Allegiant Stadium • Paradise, Nevada

- Date: November 19, 2021
- Game time: 8:30 p.m. PST
- Game weather: Indoor
- Game attendance: 16,713
- Referee: Michael VanderVelde
- TV announcers (CBSSN): Rich Waltz (play-by-play), Aaron Taylor (analysis), Jenny Dell (sidelines), and Scott Brandwein (producer)
- Another 10–Win Season, Game Book

Game information

First quarter

- UNLV – Daniel Gutierrez 21 Yd Field Goal, 9:58. Rebels 3–0. Drive: 10 plays, 72 yards, 5:02.
- SDSU – Andrew Aleki 17 Yd Interception Return (Matt Araiza Kick), 5:15. Aztecs 7–3. Drive: 2 plays, -3 yards, 0:51.

Second quarter

- UNLV – Zyell Griffin 43 Yd pass from Justin Rogers (Daniel Gutierrez Kick), 6:13. Rebels 10–7. Drive: 5 plays, 92 yards, 2:41.
- SDSU – Jesse Matthews 4 Yd pass from Lucas Johnson (Matt Araiza Kick), 2:31. Aztecs 14–10. Drive: 7 plays, 59 yards, 3:38.
- SDSU – Jesse Matthews 24 Yd pass from Lucas Johnson (Matt Araiza Kick), 0:05. Aztecs 21–10. Drive: 7 plays, 54 yards, 0:44.

Third quarter

- UNLV – Giovanni Fauolo Sr. 8 Yd pass from Justin Rogers (Daniel Gutierrez Kick), 8:24. Aztecs 21–17. Drive: 6 plays, 94 yards, 4:18.
- UNLV – Daniel Gutierrez 22 Yd Field Goal, 1:13. Aztecs 21–20. Drive: 10 plays, 60 yards, 5:24.

Fourth quarter

- SDSU – Jesse Matthews 7 Yd pass from Lucas Johnson (Matt Araiza Kick), 3:33. Aztecs 28–20. Drive: 9 plays, 50 yards, 4:55.

Odds

- Line: SDSU –11.0
- Over/Under: 41.0
- ESPN FPI: SDSU 75.3%

Statistics	SDSU	UNLV
First downs	15	14
Plays–yards	57–290	60–394
Rushes–yards	32–98	26–22
Passing yards	192	372
Passing: comp–att–int	18–25–1	21–34–2
Time of possession	29:49	30:10

Team	Category	Player	Statistics
SDSU	Passing	Lucas Johnson	18-24, 192 YDS, 3 TD, 1 INT
SDSU	Rushing	Greg Bell	17 CAR, 58 YDS
SDSU	Receiving	Elijah Kothe	5 REC, 84 YDS
UNLV	Passing	Justin Rogers	15-21, 305 YDS, 2 TD, 1 INT
UNLV	Rushing	Charles Williams	16 CAR, 35 YDS
UNLV	Receiving	Steve Jenkins	5 REC, 176 YDS

=== Boise State ===
Boise State Broncos at No. 21 San Diego State Aztecs

Quarter	1	2	3	4	Total
Boise State	7	9	0	0	16
No. 21 San Diego State	3	10	14	0	27

at Dignity Health Sports Park • Carson, California

- Date: November 26, 2021
- Game time: 9:00 a.m. PST
- Game weather: Sunny, 65 °F (18 °C)
- Game attendance: 11,886
- Referee: Steve Baron
- TV announcers (CBS): Rich Waltz (play-by-play), Aaron Taylor (analysis), Sherree Burruss (sidelines), and Scott Brandwein (producer)
- No. 21 Football Rallies Past Boise State, 27–16, Game Book

Game information

First quarter

- BSU – Kurt Rafdal 20 Yd pass from Hank Bachmeier (Jonah Dalmas Kick), 6:08. Broncos 7–0. Drive: 6 plays, 69 yards, 1:58.
- SDSU – Matt Araiza 31 Yd Field Goal, 1:10. Broncos 7–3. Drive: 12 plays, 66 yards, 4:53.

Second quarter

- BSU – Khalil Shakir 13 Yd pass from Hank Bachmeier (Jonah Dalmas PAT failed), 11:45. Broncos 13–3. Drive: 10 plays, 80 yards, 2:13.
- BSU – Jonah Dalmas 22 Yd Field Goal, 8:39. Broncos 16–3. Drive: 7 plays, 26 yards, 2:16.
- SDSU – Jesse Matthews 29 Yd pass from Jordon Brookshire (Matt Araiza Kick), 1:30. Broncos 16–10. Drive: 5 plays, 78 yards, 1:34.
- SDSU – Matt Araiza 37 Yd Field Goal, 0:03. Broncos 16–13. Drive: 5 plays, 38 yards, 0:25.

Third quarter

- SDSU – Greg Bell 2 Yd Run (Matt Araiza Kick), 9:26. Aztecs 20–16. Drive: 11 plays, 75 yards, 5:34.
- SDSU – Jordon Brookshire 16 Yd Run (Matt Araiza Kick), 7:46. Aztecs 27–16. Drive: 3 plays, 43 yards, 0:36.

Fourth quarter

- No scoring

Odds

- Line: BSU –3.0
- Over/Under: 44.0
- ESPN FPI: BSU 59.4%

Statistics	BSU	SDSU
First downs	20	20
Plays–yards	77–319	74–408
Rushes–yards	35–91	38–118
Passing yards	228	290
Passing: comp–att–int	22–42–3	20–36–0
Time of possession	25:43	34:17

Team	Category	Player	Statistics
BSU	Passing	Hank Bachmeier	21-40, 222 YDS, 2 TD, 3 INT
BSU	Rushing	George Holani	20 CAR, 70 YDS
BSU	Receiving	Khalil Shakir	6 REC, 74 YDS, 1 TD
SDSU	Passing	Jordon Brookshire	11-15, 192 YDS, 1 TD
SDSU	Rushing	Jordon Brookshire	9 CAR, 46 YDS, 1 TD
SDSU	Receiving	Jesse Matthews	9 REC, 133 YDS, 1 TD

=== Utah State ===
MW Championship Game: Utah State Aggies at No. 19 San Diego State Aztecs

Quarter	1	2	3	4	Total
Utah State	0	14	15	17	46
No. 19 San Diego State	0	3	3	7	13

at Dignity Health Sports Park • Carson, California

- Date: December 4, 2021
- Game time: 12:00 p.m. PST
- Game weather: Hazy, 65 °F (18 °C)
- Game attendance: 13,445
- Referee: Michael Vandervelde
- TV announcers (FOX): Joe Davis (play-by-play), Brock Huard (analysis), Bruce Feldman (sidelines), and Bo Garrett (producer)
- Aztecs Fall to Utah State in MW Championship Game, Game Book

Game information

First quarter

- No scoring

Second quarter

- USU – Derek Wright 5 Yd pass from Logan Bonner (Connor Coles Kick), 9:06. Aggies 7–0. Drive: 10 plays, 53 yards, 4:29.
- USU – Calvin Tyler Jr. 1 Yd Run (Connor Coles Kick), 4:57. Aggies 14–0. Drive: 6 plays, 63 yards, 1:31.
- SDSU – Matt Araiza 23 Yd Field Goal, 1:01. Aggies 14–3. Drive: 10 plays, 77 yards, 3:56.

Third quarter

- USU – Brandon Bowling 58 Yd pass from Logan Bonner (Connor Coles Kick), 13:09. Aggies 21–3. Drive: 5 plays, 75 yards, 1:51.
- USU – Team Safety, 11:38. Aggies 23–3. Drive: 3 plays, 1 yard, 1:31.
- SDSU – Matt Araiza 36 Yd Field Goal, 6:58. Aggies 23–6. Drive: 8 plays, 21 yards, 2:57.
- USU – Brandon Bowling 18 Yd pass from Logan Bonner (Connor Coles PAT blocked), 1:54. Aggies 29–6. Drive: 6 plays, 35 yards, 3:25.

Fourth quarter

- USU – Connor Coles 20 Yd Field Goal, 13:40. Aggies 32–6. Drive: 7 plays, 17 yards, 2:59.
- USU – Justin McGriff 9 Yd pass from Logan Bonner (Connor Coles Kick), 10:21. Aggies 39–6. Drive: 5 plays, 40 yards, 2:01.
- SDSU – Jesse Matthews 5 Yd pass from Jalen Mayden (Matt Araiza Kick), 6:22. Aggies 39–13. Drive: 8 plays, 80 yards, 3:59.
- USU – Jordan Nathan 0 Yd Run (Connor Coles Kick), 3:58. Aggies 46–13. Drive: 4 plays, 38 yards, 2:24.

Odds

- Line: SDSU –6.5
- Over/Under: 49.5
- ESPN FPI: SDSU 75.9%

Statistics	USU	SDSU
First downs	23	17
Plays–yards	71–383	68–315
Rushes–yards	28–65	39–148
Passing yards	318	167
Passing: comp–att–int	29–43–1	16–29–0
Time of possession	28:58	31:02

Team	Category	Player	Statistics
USU	Passing	Logan Bonner	29-42, 318 YDS, 4 TD, 1 INT
USU	Rushing	Calvin Tyler Jr.	17 CAR, 41 YDS, 1 TD
USU	Receiving	Brandon Bowling	8 REC, 154 YDS, 2 TD
SDSU	Passing	Jordon Brookshire	11-23, 117 YDS
SDSU	Rushing	Greg Bell	11 CAR, 50 YDS
SDSU	Receiving	Jesse Matthews	8 REC, 82 YDS, 1 TD

=== Vs. UTSA ===
Frisco Bowl: No. 24 San Diego State Aztecs vs. UTSA Roadrunners

Quarter	1	2	3	4	Total
No. 24 San Diego State	7	10	14	7	38
UTSA	14	0	10	0	24

at Toyota Stadium • Frisco, Texas

- Date: December 21, 2021
- Game time: 4:30 p.m. PST
- Game weather: Sunny, 56 °F (13 °C)
- Game attendance: 15,801
- Referee: Ron Hudson
- TV announcers (ESPN): Ted Leitner (play-by-play), Rich Ohrnberger (analysis), Jon Schaeffer (half, post), Mike Costa (pre), and J.R. Tolver (pre)
- Aztecs Claim Frisco Bowl with 12th Win of the Season, Game Book

Game information

First quarter

- UTSA – De'Corian Clark 12 Yd pass from Frank Harris (Hunter Duplessis Kick), 12:36. Roadrunners 7–0. Drive: 7 plays, 75 yards, 2:24.
- SDSU – Jesse Matthews 20 Yd pass from Lucas Johnson (Matt Araiza Kick), 5:09. Tie 7–7. Drive: 6 plays, 64 yards, 2:03.
- UTSA – Brenden Brady 2 Yd Run (Hunter Duplessis Kick), 2:02. Roadrunners 14–7. Drive: 8 plays, 75 yards, 3:07.

Second quarter

- SDSU – Jesse Matthews 11 Yd pass from Lucas Johnson (Matt Araiza Kick), 9:14. Tie 14–14. Drive: 9 plays, 54 yards, 4:18.
- SDSU – Matt Araiza 33 Yd Field Goal, 0:00. Aztecs 17–14. Drive: 10 plays, 74 yards, 1:55.

Third quarter

- SDSU – Greg Bell 1 Yd Run (Matt Araiza Kick), 11:59. Aztecs 24–14. Drive: 6 plays, 48 yards, 3:01.
- UTSA – Hunter Duplessis 41 Yd Field Goal, 10:09. Aztecs 24–27. Drive: 6 plays, 51 yards, 1:50.
- SDSU – Tyrell Shavers 24 Yd pass from Lucas Johnson (Matt Araiza Kick), 2:39. Aztecs 31–17. Drive: 6 plays, 69 yards, 2:58.
- UTSA – Zakhari Franklin 3 Yd pass from Frank Harris (Hunter Duplessis Kick), 0:00. Aztecs 31–24. Drive: 8 plays, 75 yards, 2:39.

Fourth quarter

- SDSU – Lucas Johnson 2 Yd Run (Matt Araiza Kick), 9:51. Aztecs 38–24. Drive: 9 plays, 65 yards, 5:09.

Odds

- Line: SDSU –3.0
- Over/Under: 48.0
- ESPN FPI: UTSA 63.0%

Statistics	SDSU	UTSA
First downs	31	21
Plays–yards	76–489	62–388
Rushes–yards	40–156	24–117
Passing yards	333	271
Passing: comp–att–int	24–36–0	22–38–1
Time of possession	37:51	22:09

Team	Category	Player	Statistics
SDSU	Passing	Lucas Johnson	24-36, 333 YDS, 3 TD
SDSU	Rushing	Greg Bell	26 CAR, 101 YDS, 1 TD
SDSU	Receiving	Jesse Matthews	11 REC, 175 YDS, 2 TD
UTSA	Passing	Frank Harris	22-36, 271 YDS, 2 TD, 1 INT
UTSA	Rushing	Brenden Brady	16 CAR, 76 YDS, 1 TD
UTSA	Receiving	Zakhari Franklin	8 REC, 89 YDS, 1 TD

== Honors ==
=== Conference ===
- Defensive player of the year: Cameron Thomas, DL, Jr.
- Special teams player of the year: Matt Araiza, P/PK, Jr.
- Coach of the Year: Brady Hoke

All–Mountain West First Team
Name	Position	Year
Offense
William Dunkle	OL	Jr.
Zachary Thomas	OL	Sr.
Jordan Byrd	KR	Sr.
Defense
Cameron Thomas	DL	Jr.
Caden McDonald	LB	Sr.
Patrick McMorris	DB	Jr.
Trenton Thompson	DB	Sr.
Matt Araiza	P	Jr.

All–Mountain West Second Team
Name	Position	Year
Offense
Greg Bell	RB	Sr.
Matt Araiza	PK	Jr.
Defense
Keshawn Banks	DL	Sr.
Tayler Hawkins	DB	Sr.

== Rankings ==
Ranking movements Legend: ██ Increase in ranking ██ Decrease in ranking — = Not ranked RV = Received votes
	Week															
Poll	Pre	1	2	3	4	5	6	7	8	9	10	11	12	13	14	Final
AP	—	—	—	RV	RV	25	24	22	21	RV	RV	23	22	19	RV	25
Coaches	—	—	RV	RV	RV	RV	24	21	20	RV	RV	23	22	19	RV	RV
CFP	Not released									24	22	19	21	19	24	Not released
