= 2021 UTEP Miners football team =

American college football season

2021 UTEP Miners football

New Mexico Bowl, L 24–31 vs. Fresno State
- Conference: Conference USA
- West Division
- Record: 7–6 (4–4 C-USA)
- Head coach: Dana Dimel (4th season)
- Offensive coordinator: Dave Warner (1st season)
- Offensive scheme: Pro-style
- Defensive coordinator: Bradley Dale Peveto (1st season)
- Base defense: 4–2–5
- Home stadium: Sun Bowl

2021 Conference USA football standings
	Conf.			Overall
Team	W		L	W		L
East Division
Western Kentucky xy	7	–	1	9	–	5
Marshall	5	–	3	7	–	6
Old Dominion	5	–	3	6	–	7
Middle Tennessee	4	–	4	7	–	6
Florida Atlantic	3	–	5	5	–	7
Charlotte	3	–	5	5	–	7
FIU	0	–	8	1	–	11
West Division
UTSA xy$	7	–	1	12	–	2
UAB	6	–	2	9	–	4
North Texas	5	–	3	6	–	7
UTEP	4	–	4	7	–	6
Rice	3	–	5	4	–	8
Southern Miss	2	–	6	3	–	9
Louisiana Tech	2	–	6	3	–	9
Championship: UTSA 49, Western Kentucky 41
$ – Conference champion; x – Division champion/co-champions; y – Championship game participant

The 2021 UTEP Miners football team represented the University of Texas at El Paso (UTEP) as a member of the West Division in Conference USA (C-USA) during the 2021 NCAA Division I FCS football season. Led by fourth-year head coach Dana Dimel, the Miners compiled an overall record of 7–6 with a mark of 4–4 in conference play, placing fourth in C-USA's West Division. UTEP was bowl eligible for the first time since the 2014 season, and was invited to the New Mexico Bowl, where the Miners lost to Fresno State. The team played home games at the Sun Bowl in El Paso, Texas.

== Schedule ==
UTEP announced its 2021 football schedule on January 27, 2021. The 2021 schedule consisted of six home and six away games in the regular season.

Date	Time	Opponent	Site	TV	Result	Attendance
August 28	7:30 p.m.	at New Mexico State*	Aggie Memorial Stadium; Las Cruces, NM (Battle of I-10)	KVIA-TV, BSAZ, FloSports	W 30–3	19,034
September 4	7:00 p.m.	Bethune–Cookman*	Sun Bowl; El Paso, TX	ESPN3	W 38–28	14,554
September 10	7:30 p.m.	at Boise State*	Albertsons Stadium; Boise, ID	FS1	L 13–54	35,518
September 25	7:00 p.m.	New Mexico*	Sun Bowl; El Paso, TX	ESPN+	W 20–13	15,069
October 2	7:00 p.m.	Old Dominion^{†}	Sun Bowl; El Paso, TX	ESPN+	W 28–21	11,025
October 9	5:00 p.m.	at Southern Miss	M. M. Roberts Stadium; Hattiesburg, MS	ESPN3	W 26–13	26,049
October 16	7:00 p.m.	Louisiana Tech	Sun Bowl; El Paso, TX	ESPN+	W 19–3	18,468
October 30	4:00 p.m.	at Florida Atlantic	FAU Stadium; Boca Raton, FL	ESPN+	L 25–28	16,432
November 6	8:15 p.m.	UTSA	Sun Bowl; El Paso, TX	ESPN2	L 23–44	31,658
November 13	2:00 p.m.	at North Texas	Apogee Stadium; Denton, TX	ESPN+	L 17–20	20,056
November 20	2:00 p.m.	Rice	Sun Bowl; El Paso, TX	ESPN+	W 38–28	10,097
November 26	12:00 p.m.	at UAB	Protective Stadium; Birmingham, AL	ESPN+	L 25–42	19,683
December 18	12:15 p.m.	vs. Fresno State*	Dreamstyle Stadium; Albuquerque, NM (New Mexico Bowl)	ESPN	L 24–31	16,422
*Non-conference game; ^{†}Homecoming; All times are in Mountain time

== Game summaries ==
=== At New Mexico State ===
UTEP at New Mexico State
(Battle of I-10)

Team	1	2	3	4	Total
• Miners	17	3	10	0	30
Aggies	0	3	0	0	3

- Date: August 28, 2021
- Location: Aggie Memorial Stadium
  Las Cruces, NM
- Game start: 7:38 p.m. MDT
- Elapsed time: 3 hours and 19 minutes
- Game attendance: 19,034
- Game weather: Temperature: 84 °F (29 °C) • Weather: Sunny • Wind: NE 6 MPH
- Referee: Kevin Brunette
- TV announcers (KVIA-TV/BSAZ/FloSports/Comcast): Adam Young (play–by–play), Danny Knee (analyst) and Stephanie Shields (sideline)

Scoring summary
1	10:37	UTEP	Deion Hankins 5–yard run (Gavin Baechle kick) (5 plays, 80 yards, 2:54)	UTEP 7–0
1	09:09	UTEP	Gavin Baechle 35–yard field goal (4 plays, 7 yards, 1:17)	UTEP 10–0
1	01:49	UTEP	Ronald Awatt 34–yard run (Gavin Baechle kick) (6 plays, 80 yards, 3:16)	UTEP 17–0
2	13:48	NMSU	Ethan Albertson 27–yard field goal (10 plays, 66 yards, 3:01)	UTEP 17–3
2	00:00	UTEP	Gavin Baechle 27–yard field goal (12 plays, 58 yards, 4:50)	UTEP 20–3
3	13:48	UTEP	Jacob Cowing 59–yard pass from Gavin Hardison (Gavin Baechle kick) (3 plays, 75 yards, 1:12)	UTEP 27–3
3	04:02	UTEP	Gavin Baechle 33–yard field goal (10 plays, 65 yards, 5:38)	UTEP 30–3

Statistics	UTEP	New Mexico State
First downs	19	20
Total yards	452	190
Rushing yards	203	101
Passing yards	249	89
Turnovers	0	3
Time of possession	32:29	27:31

Team	Category	Player	Statistics
UTEP	Passing	Gavin Hardison	11/16, 249 yards, 1 TD, 1 INT
UTEP	Rushing	Ronald Awatt	11 carries, 74 yards, 1 TD
UTEP	Receiving	Jacob Cowing	5 receptions, 158 yards, 1 TD
New Mexico State	Passing	Jonah Johnson	8/24, 82 yards
New Mexico State	Rushing	Juwaun Price	9 carries, 37 yards
New Mexico State	Receiving	Dominic Gicinto	2 receptions, 31 yards

=== Bethune–Cookman ===
Bethune–Cookman at UTEP

Team	1	2	3	4	Total
Wildcats	0	0	14	14	28
• Miners	10	0	7	21	38

- Date: September 4, 2021
- Location: Sun Bowl
  El Paso, TX
- Game start: 7:05 p.m. MDT
- Elapsed time: 3 hours and 20 minutes
- Game attendance: 14,554
- Game weather: Temperature: 91 °F (33 °C) • Weather: Sunny • Wind: E 8 MPH
- Referee: Ed Ardito
- TV announcers (ESPN3): Erik Elken (play–by–play) and Trevor Vittatoe (analyst)

Scoring summary
1	08:13	UTEP	Gavin Baechle 22–yard field goal (4 plays, 5 yards, 1:30)	UTEP 3–0
1	00:39	UTEP	Trent Thompson 2–yard pass from Gavin Hardison (Gavin Baechle kick) (12 plays, 78 yards, 5:05)	UTEP 10–0
3	13:33	BCU	Marcus Riley 4–yard pass from Shannon Patrick (Dylan Moghaddam kick) (2 plays, 6 yards, 0:42)	UTEP 10–7
3	06:41	UTEP	Calvin Brownholtz 1–yard run (Gavin Baechle kick) (13 plays, 72 yards, 6:46)	UTEP 17–7
3	03:31	BCU	Kemari Averett 7–yard pass from Shannon Patrick (Dylan Moghaddam kick) (6 plays, 89 yards, 3:04)	UTEP 17–14
4	12:59	UTEP	Jacob Cowing 6–yard pass from Gavin Hardison (Gavin Baechle kick) (10 plays, 83 yards, 5:27)	UTEP 24–14
4	10:44	UTEP	Justin Garrett 8–yard pass from Gavin Hardison (Gavin Baechle kick) (3 plays, 49 yards, 1:15)	UTEP 31–14
4	05:28	BCU	Que'shaun Byrd 2–yard run (Dylan Moghaddam kick) (9 plays, 87 yards, 5:12)	UTEP 31–21
4	02:15	UTEP	Ronald Awatt 19–yard run (Gavin Baechle kick) (6 plays, 50 yards, 3:13)	UTEP 38–21
4	01:17	BCU	Aaron Thompson 3–yard run (Dylan Moghaddam kick) (3 plays, 75 yards, 0:58)	UTEP 38–28

Statistics	Bethune–Cookman	UTEP
First downs	12	24
Total yards	333	472
Rushing yards	118	289
Passing yards	215	183
Turnovers	3	4
Time of possession	24:26	35:34

Team	Category	Player	Statistics
Bethune–Cookman	Passing	Shannon Patrick	15/22, 215 yards, 2 TDs, 1 INT
Bethune–Cookman	Rushing	Que'shaun Byrd	12 carries, 98 yards, 1 TD
Bethune–Cookman	Receiving	Kemari Averett	4 receptions, 72 yards, 1 TD
UTEP	Passing	Gavin Hardison	14/23, 183 yards, 3 TDs
UTEP	Rushing	Ronald Awatt	19 carries, 126 yards, 1 TD
UTEP	Receiving	Tyrin Smith	4 receptions, 76 yards

=== At Boise State ===
UTEP at Boise State

Team	1	2	3	4	Total
Miners	3	10	0	0	13
• Broncos	10	31	10	3	54

- Date: September 10, 2021
- Location: Albertsons Stadium
  Boise, ID
- Game start: 7:40 p.m. MDT
- Elapsed time: 3 hours and 20 minutes
- Game attendance: 35,518
- Game weather: Temperature: 68 °F (20 °C) • Weather: Cloudy • Wind: E 4 MPH
- Referee: Rodney Burnette
- TV announcers (FS1): Alex Faust (play–by–play) and Petros Papadakis (analyst)

Scoring summary
1	10:36	UTEP	Gavin Baechle 33–yard field goal (9 plays, 59 yards, 4:24)	UTEP 3–0
1	09:08	BSU	Jonah Dalmas 39–yard field goal (6 plays, 58 yards, 1:21)	TIE 3–3
1	06:42	BSU	Stefan Cobbs 81–yard punt return (Jonah Dalmas kick)	BSU 10–3
2	13:26	UTEP	Gavin Baechle 21–yard field goal (15 plays, 72 yards, 8:16)	BSU 10–6
2	11:33	BSU	George Holani 10–yard run (Jonah Dalmas kick) (6 plays, 75 yards, 1:53)	BSU 17–6
2	11:15	BSU	Andrew Van Buren 3–yard run (Jonah Dalmas kick) (1 play, 3 yards, 0:04)	BSU 24–6
2	08:43	BSU	Stefan Cobbs 61–yard pass from Hank Bachmeier (Jonah Dalmas kick) (1 play, 61 yards, 0:10)	BSU 31–6
2	06:21	UTEP	Jacob Cowing 48–yard pass from Gavin Hardison (Gavin Baechle kick) (5 plays, 75 yards, 2:22)	BSU 31–13
2	03:00	BSU	Jonah Dalmas 27–yard field goal (9 plays, 69 yards, 3:15)	BSU 34–13
2	00:14	BSU	Andrew Van Buren 1–yard run (Jonah Dalmas kick) (5 plays, 48 yards, 0:33)	BSU 41–13
3	13:50	BSU	Tyneil Hopper 23–yard pass from Hank Bachmeier (Jonah Dalmas kick) (3 plays, 38 yards, 1:02)	BSU 48–13
3	04:19	BSU	Jonah Dalmas 29–yard field goal (4 plays, 7 yards, 1:52)	BSU 51–13
4	04:20	BSU	Jonah Dalmas 34–yard field goal (8 plays, 33 yards, 3:23)	BSU 54–13

Statistics	UTEP	Boise State
First downs	20	21
Total yards	336	461
Rushing yards	104	121
Passing yards	232	340
Turnovers	6	3
Time of possession	34:36	25:24

Team	Category	Player	Statistics
UTEP	Passing	Gavin Hardison	15/24, 223 yards, 1 TD, 3 INTs
UTEP	Rushing	Ronald Awatt	15 carries, 44 yards
UTEP	Receiving	Jacob Cowing	6 receptions, 112 yards, 1 TD
Boise State	Passing	Hank Bachmeier	17/24, 340 yards, 2 TDs
Boise State	Rushing	Tyler Crowe	7 carries, 45 yards
Boise State	Receiving	Khalil Shakir	7 receptions, 166 yards

=== New Mexico ===
New Mexico at UTEP

Team	1	2	3	4	Total
Lobos	7	6	0	0	13
• Miners	0	3	14	3	20

- Date: September 25, 2021
- Location: Sun Bowl
  El Paso, TX
- Game start: 7:05 p.m. MDT
- Elapsed time: 3 hours and 14 minutes
- Game attendance: 15,069
- Game weather: Temperature: 81 °F (27 °C) • Weather: Cloudy • Wind: N 12mph
- Referee: Craig Helser
- TV announcers (ESPN+): Erik Elken (play–by–play) and Trevor Vittatoe (analyst)

Statistics	New Mexico	UTEP
First downs	17	12
Total yards	288	344
Rushing yards	123	51
Passing yards	165	293
Turnovers	2	1
Time of possession	29:52	30:08

Team	Category	Player	Statistics
New Mexico	Passing	Terry Wilson Jr.	16/38, 160 yards, INT
New Mexico	Rushing	Aaron Dumas	8 carries, 28 yards
New Mexico	Receiving	Kyle Jarvis	4 receptions, 59 yards
UTEP	Passing	Gavin Hardison	15/29, 293 yards, TD, INT
UTEP	Rushing	Ronald Awatt	12 carries, 34 yards
UTEP	Receiving	Jacob Cowing	7 receptions, 174 yards, TD

=== Old Dominion ===
Old Dominion at UTEP

Team	1	2	3	4	Total
Monarchs	0	7	14	0	21
• Miners	3	14	3	8	28

- Date: October 2, 2021
- Location: Sun Bowl
  El Paso, TX
- Game start: 7:00 p.m. MDT
- Elapsed time: 3 hours and 9 minutes
- Game attendance: 11,025
- Game weather: 79 °F (26 °C) • Weather: Sunny • Wind: N 2 MPH
- Referee: Rodney Burnette
- TV announcers (ESPN+): Erik Elken (play–by–play) and Trevor Vittatoe (analyst)

Scoring summary
1	09:55	UTEP	Gavin Baechle 29-yard field goal (7 plays, 33 yards, 3:24)	UTEP 3–0
2	11:08	UTEP	Justin Garrett 7-yard pass from Gavin Hardison (Gavin Baechle kick) (16 plays, 80 yards, 8:10)	UTEP 10–0
2	00:51	UTEP	Tyrin Smith 7-yard pass from Gavin Hardison (Gavin Baechle kick) (15 plays, 87 yards, 8:06)	UTEP 17–0
2	00:10	ODU	Ali Jennings III 20-yard pass from D. J. Mack Jr. (Nick Rice kick) (8 plays, 75 yards, 0:41)	UTEP 17–7
3	11:37	UTEP	Gavin Baechle 40-yard field goal (8 plays, 64 yards, 3:19)	UTEP 20–7
3	05:27	ODU	D. J. Mack Jr. 5-yard rush (Nick Rice kick) (19 plays, 75 yards, 6:10)	UTEP 20–14
3	04:27	ODU	AC White 11-yard punt returned (Nick Rice kick) (5 plays, 72 yards, 0:55)	ODU 21–20
4	06:59	UTEP	Deion Hankins 3-yard rush (Gavin Hardison two-point conversion pass to Justin Garrett) (9 plays, 63 yards, 4:47)	UTEP 28–21

Statistics	Old Dominion	UTEP
First downs	19	17
Total yards	282	333
Rushing yards	88	142
Passing yards	194	191
Turnovers	2	0
Time of possession	25:32	34:28

Team	Category	Player	Statistics
Old Dominion	Passing	D. J. Mack Jr.	20/34, 194 yards, 1 TD, 1 INT
Old Dominion	Rushing	Blake Watson	13 carries, 35 yards
Old Dominion	Receiving	Zack Kuntz	8 receptions, 54 yards
UTEP	Passing	Gavin Hardison	10/20, 191 yards, 2 TDs
UTEP	Rushing	Deion Hankins	23 carries, 75 yards, 1 TD
UTEP	Receiving	Jacob Cowing	4 receptions, 118 yards

=== At Southern Miss ===
UTEP at Southern Miss

Team	1	2	3	4	Total
• Miners	7	7	7	5	26
Golden Eagles	7	0	0	6	13

- Date: October 9, 2021
- Location: M. M. Roberts Stadium
  Hattiesburg, MS
- Game start: 6:00 p.m. CDT
- Game attendance: 26,049
- Television network: ESPN3

Statistics	UTEP	Southern Miss
First downs	16	17
Total yards	392	254
Rushing yards	265	15
Passing yards	127	239
Turnovers	1	2
Time of possession	30:48	29:12

Team	Category	Player	Statistics
UTEP	Passing	Gavin Hardison	7/17, 127 yards, INT
UTEP	Rushing	Ronald Awatt	18 rushes, 159 yards, TD
UTEP	Receiving	Tyrin Smith	1 reception, 55 yards
Southern Miss	Passing	Jake Lange	20/31, 239 yards, 2 TD, INT
Southern Miss	Rushing	Frank Gore Jr.	16 rushes, 43 yards
Southern Miss	Receiving	Jakarius Caston	4 receptions, 94 yards

=== Louisiana Tech ===
Louisiana Tech at UTEP

Team	1	2	3	4	Total
Bulldogs	0	3	0	0	3
• Miners	14	2	3	0	19

- Date: October 16, 2021
- Location: Sun Bowl
  El Paso, TX
- Game start: 7:00 p.m. MDT
- Game attendance: 18,468
- Game weather: Sunny • Temperature: 73 °F (23 °C)
- Referee: Joe Lehring
- Television network: ESPN+

Scoring summary
1	9:19	UTEP	Deion Hankins 16-yard run (Gavin Baechle kick) (13 plays, 75 yards, 5:41)	UTEP 7–0
1	6:02	UTEP	Deion Hankins 4-yard run (Gavin Baechle kick) (4 plays, 34 yards, 1:18)	UTEP 14–0
2	11:53	UTEP	Marcus Williams Jr. tackled in own end zone by Jalen Rudolph	UTEP 16–0
2	6:56	LATECH	Jacob Barnes 25-yard field goal (9 plays, 56 yards, 3:35)	UTEP 16–3
3	0:38	UTEP	Gavin Baechle 41-yard field goal (9 plays, 35 yards, 4:29)	UTEP 19–3

Statistics	Louisiana Tech	UTEP
First downs	14	18
Total yards	288	385
Rushing yards	92	102
Passing yards	196	283
Turnovers	3	4
Time of possession	23:17	36:43

Team	Category	Player	Statistics
Louisiana Tech	Passing	Austin Kendall	14/28, 174 yards, 3 INT
Louisiana Tech	Rushing	Marcus Williams Jr.	7 rushes, 42 yards
Louisiana Tech	Receiving	Marcus Williams Jr.	2 receptions, 59 yards
UTEP	Passing	Gavin Hardison	19/29, 283 yards, INT
UTEP	Rushing	Deion Hankins	15 rushes, 55 yards, 2 TD
UTEP	Receiving	Jacob Cowing	9 receptions, 166 yards

=== At Florida Atlantic ===
UTEP at Florida Atlantic

Team	1	2	3	4	Total
Miners	3	7	0	15	25
• Owls	7	7	7	7	28

- Date: October 30, 2021
- Location: FAU Stadium
  Boca Raton, FL
- Game start: 6:06 p.m. EDT
- Elapsed time: 2 hours and 42 minutes
- Game attendance: 16,432
- Game weather: Temperature: 78 °F (26 °C) • Weather: Sunny • Wind: N 6 mph
- Referee: Kevin Randall
- Television network: ESPN Networks

Statistics	UTEP	Florida Atlantic
First downs	18	12
Total yards	436	281
Rushing yards	110	131
Passing yards	327	149
Turnovers	2	0
Time of possession	36:56	23:04

Team	Category	Player	Statistics
UTEP	Passing	Gavin Hardison	23/46, 327 yards, 2 TD, 2 INT
UTEP	Rushing	Deion Hankins	11 carries, 72 yards
UTEP	Receiving	Tyrin Smith	4 receptions, 114 yards, TD
Florida Atlantic	Passing	N'Kosi Perry	13/26, 149 yards, TD
Florida Atlantic	Rushing	Johnny Ford	13 carries, 93 yards, TD
Florida Atlantic	Receiving	LaJohntay Wester	4 receptions, 64 yards, TD

=== UTSA ===
UTSA at UTEP

Team	1	2	3	4	Total
• Roadrunners	16	14	7	7	44
Miners	6	3	7	7	23

- Date: November 6, 2021
- Location: Sun Bowl
  El Paso, TX
- Game start: 8:15 p.m. MDT
- Game attendance: 31,658
- Game weather: Sunny
- Referee: Scott Hardin
- TV announcers (ESPN2): Clay Matvick (play-by-play), Rocky Boiman (analyst) and Tiffany Blackmon (sideline)

Statistics	UTSA	UTEP
First downs	28	20
Total yards	561	374
Rushing yards	275	127
Passing yards	286	247
Turnovers	0	0
Time of possession	33:41	26:19

Team	Category	Player	Statistics
UTSA	Passing	Frank Harris	22/34, 286 yards, 2 TD
UTSA	Rushing	Sincere McCormick	21 carries, 161 yards, TD
UTSA	Receiving	Zakhari Franklin	10 receptions, 114 yards, 2 TD
UTEP	Passing	Gavin Hardison	13/30, 247 yards, 3 TD
UTEP	Rushing	Ronald Awatt	16 carries, 83 yards
UTEP	Receiving	Jacob Cowing	5 receptions, 112 yards

=== At North Texas ===
UTEP at North Texas

Team	1	2	3	4	Total
Miners	0	7	0	10	17
• Mean Green	0	3	14	3	20

- Date: November 13, 2021
- Location: Apogee Stadium
  Denton, TX
- Game start: 3:00 p.m. CST
- Game attendance: 20,056
- Television network: ESPN+

Statistics	UTEP	North Texas
First downs	14	22
Total yards	382	423
Rushing yards	109	183
Passing yards	273	240
Turnovers	1	0
Time of possession	29:45	30:15

Team	Category	Player	Statistics
UTEP	Passing	Gavin Hardison	15/29, 273 yards, TD, INT
UTEP	Rushing	Ronald Awatt	17 rushes, 85 yards, TD
UTEP	Receiving	Jacob Cowing	5 receptions, 174 yards, TD
North Texas	Passing	Austin Aune	15/33, 240 yards, TD
North Texas	Rushing	DeAndre Torrey	18 rushes, 81 yards
North Texas	Receiving	Roderic Burns	5 receptions, 93 yards, TD

=== Rice ===
Rice at UTEP

Team	1	2	3	4	Total
Owls	0	21	0	7	28
• Miners	7	7	10	14	38

- Date: November 20, 2021
- Location: Sun Bowl
  El Paso, TX
- Game start: 2:05 p.m. MDT
- Elapsed time: 3 hours and 38 minutes
- Game attendance: 10,097
- Game weather: Temperature: 73 °F (23 °C) • Weather: Sunny • Wind: NE 7 mph
- Referee: Scott Hardin
- Television network: ESPN+

Scoring summary
1	10:08	UTEP	Jacob Cowing 7-yard pass from Gavin Hardison (Gavin Baechle kick) (9 plays, 75 yards, 4:52)	UTEP 7–0
2	10:13	RICE	Ari Broussard 1-yard run (Christian VanSickle kick) (15 plays, 70 yards, 8:45)	TIED 7–7
2	8:22	UTEP	Justin Garrett 14-yard pass from Gavin Hardison (Gavin Baechle kick) (5 plays, 66 yards, 1:45)	UTEP 14–7
2	1:03	RICE	Jack Bradley 6-yard pass from Jake Constantine (Christian VanSickle kick) (6 plays, 69 yards, 2:30)	TIED 14–14
2	0:12	RICE	Cedric Patterson III 33-yard pass from Jake Constantine (Christian VanSickle kick) (2 plays, 52 yards, 0:18)	RICE 21–14
3	5:51	UTEP	Gavin Baechle 22-yard field goal (15 plays, 78 yards, 6:29)	RICE 21–17
3	2:30	UTEP	Calvin Brownholtz 1-yard run (Gavin Baechle kick) (5 plays, 69 yards, 1:02)	UTEP 24–21
4	12:54	UTEP	Quardraiz Wadley 1-yard run (Gavin Baechle kick) (3 plays, 81 yards, 1:18)	UTEP 31–21
4	9:02	UTEP	Calvin Brownholtz 1-yard run (Gavin Baechle kick) (6 plays, 61 yards, 2:44)	UTEP 38–21
4	5:42	RICE	Luke McCaffrey 2-yard run (Christian VanSickle kick) (12 plays, 75 yards, 3:20)	UTEP 38–28

Statistics	Rice	UTEP
First downs	22	23
Total yards	390	488
Rushing yards	160	122
Passing yards	230	366
Turnovers	0	1
Time of possession	28:50	31:10

Team	Category	Player	Statistics
Rice	Passing	Jake Constantine	14/25, 183 yards, 2 TD
Rice	Rushing	Cameron Montgomery	9 carries, 78 yards
Rice	Receiving	Jake Bailey	5 receptions, 58 yards
UTEP	Passing	Gavin Hardison	23/35, 366 yards, 2 TD, INT
UTEP	Rushing	Ronald Awatt	9 carries, 119 yards
UTEP	Receiving	Jacob Cowing	11 receptions, 170 yards, TD

=== At UAB ===
UTEP at UAB

Team	1	2	3	4	Total
Miners	7	10	8	0	25
• Blazers	7	7	14	14	42

- Date: November 26, 2021
- Location: Protective Stadium
  Birmingham, AL
- Game start: 1:05 p.m. CST
- Elapsed time: 3 hours and 25 minutes
- Game attendance: 19,683
- Game weather: Sunny
- Referee: Kevin Vicknair
- Television network: ESPN+

Scoring summary
1	4:50	UAB	DeWayne McBride 17-yard run (Matt Quinn kick) (6 plays, 44 yards, 2:34)	UAB 7–0
1	0:07	UTEP	Quardraiz Wadley 7-yard run (Gavin Baechle kick) (10 plays, 75 yards, 4:43)	TIED 7–7
2	11:42	UTEP	Deion Hankins 11-yard run (Gavin Baechle kick) (6 plays, 50 yards, 3:18)	UTEP 14–7
2	9:15	UAB	Jermaine Brown Jr. 1-yard run (Matt Quinn kick) (6 plays, 75 yards, 2:27)	TIED 14–14
2	0:05	UTEP	Gavin Baechle 29-yard field goal (7 plays, 18 yards, 2:52)	UTEP 17–14
3	8:41	UAB	Jermaine Brown Jr. 1-yard run (Matt Quinn kick) (4 plays, 40 yards, 1:12)	UAB 21–17
3	6:25	UAB	Hayden Pittman 4-yard pass from Dylan Hopkins (Matt Quinn kick) (6 plays, 21 yards, 2:10)	UAB 28–17
3	2:01	UTEP	Jacob Cowing 30-yard pass from Gavin Hardison (Reynaldo Flores rush) (9 plays, 82 yards, 4:19)	UAB 28–25
4	11:00	UAB	Jermaine Brown Jr. 10-yard run (Matt Quinn kick) (12 plays, 78 yards, 5:55)	UAB 35–25
4	10:52	UAB	Gerrit Prince 15-yard pass from Dylan Hopkins (Matt Quinn kick) (1 play, 15 yards, 0:05)	UAB 42–25

Statistics	UTEP	UAB
First downs	17	18
Total yards	303	328
Rushing yards	99	220
Passing yards	204	108
Turnovers	3	1
Time of possession	30:56	29:04

Team	Category	Player	Statistics
UTEP	Passing	Gavin Hardison	21/34, 204 yards, TD, INT
UTEP	Rushing	Deion Hankins	16 carries, 68 yards, TD
UTEP	Receiving	Jacob Cowing	5 receptions, 63 yards, TD
UAB	Passing	Dylan Hopkins	15/20, 108 yards, 2 TD, INT
UAB	Rushing	DeWayne McBride	7 carries, 99 yards, TD
UAB	Receiving	RaJae' Johnson-Sanders	5 receptions, 24 yards
