= 2021 Louisiana Tech Bulldogs football team =

American college football season

2021 Louisiana Tech Bulldogs football
- Conference: Conference USA
- West Division
- Record: 3–9 (2–6 C-USA)
- Head coach: Skip Holtz (9th season)
- Offensive coordinator: Joe Sloan (2nd season)
- Offensive scheme: Multiple
- Defensive coordinator: David Blackwell (2nd season)
- Base defense: 3–4
- Home stadium: Joe Aillet Stadium

2021 Conference USA football standings
	Conf.			Overall
Team	W		L	W		L
East Division
Western Kentucky xy	7	–	1	9	–	5
Marshall	5	–	3	7	–	6
Old Dominion	5	–	3	6	–	7
Middle Tennessee	4	–	4	7	–	6
Florida Atlantic	3	–	5	5	–	7
Charlotte	3	–	5	5	–	7
FIU	0	–	8	1	–	11
West Division
UTSA xy$	7	–	1	12	–	2
UAB	6	–	2	9	–	4
North Texas	5	–	3	6	–	7
UTEP	4	–	4	7	–	6
Rice	3	–	5	4	–	8
Southern Miss	2	–	6	3	–	9
Louisiana Tech	2	–	6	3	–	9
Championship: UTSA 49, Western Kentucky 41
$ – Conference champion; x – Division champion/co-champions; y – Championship game participant

The 2021 Louisiana Tech Bulldogs football team represented Louisiana Tech University in the 2021 NCAA Division I FBS football season. The Bulldogs played their home games at Joe Aillet Stadium in Ruston, Louisiana, and competed in the West Division of Conference USA (C-USA). They were led by ninth-year head coach Skip Holtz.

== Preseason ==
=== Media poll ===
The Bulldogs were predicted to finish third in the West Division.

== Schedule ==
Date	Time	Opponent	Site	TV	Result	Attendance
September 4	3:00 p.m.	at Mississippi State*	Davis Wade Stadium; Starkville, MS	ESPNU	L 34–35	44,669
September 11	6:00 p.m.	No. 13 (FCS) Southeastern Louisiana*	Joe Aillet Stadium; Ruston, LA	ESPN3	W 45–42	15,328
September 18	2:30 p.m.	SMU*	Joe Aillet Stadium; Ruston, LA	CBSSN	L 37–39	15,326
September 25	6:00 p.m.	North Texas	Joe Aillet Stadium; Ruston, LA	Stadium	W 24–17	15,488
October 2	5:00 p.m.	at No. 23 NC State*	Carter–Finley Stadium; Raleigh, NC	ACCNX/ESPN+	L 27–34	51,064
October 16	8:00 p.m.	at UTEP	Sun Bowl; El Paso, TX	ESPN+	L 3–19	18,468
October 23	6:00 p.m.	No. 24 UTSA^{†}	Joe Aillet Stadium; Ruston, LA	Stadium	L 16–45	18,314
October 30	2:30 p.m.	at Old Dominion	S.B. Ballard Stadium; Norfolk, VA	CBSSN	L 20–23	13,309
November 6	11:00 a.m.	at UAB	Protective Stadium; Birmingham, AL	CBSSN	L 38–52	21,261
November 13	2:30 p.m.	Charlotte	Joe Aillet Stadium; Ruston, LA	Stadium	W 42–32	14,068
November 19	7:00 p.m.	Southern Miss	Joe Aillet Stadium; Ruston, LA (Rivalry in Dixie)	CBSSN	L 19–35	10,410
November 27	12:00 p.m.	at Rice	Rice Stadium; Houston, TX	ESPN+	L 31–35	15,832
*Non-conference game; ^{†}Homecoming; Rankings from AP Poll released prior to the game; All times are in Central time

== Personnel ==
2021 Louisiana Tech Bulldogs football team roster
Players
Coaches
Offense

Pos.	#	Name	Class
QB	2	J. D. Head	Fr
QB	3	Aaron Allen	So
WR	5	Griffin Hebert	Jr
WR	6	Smoke Harris	So
RB	7	Marcus Williams Jr.	GS
WR	8	Jawuan Johnson	Jr
QB	9	Luke Anthony	GS
QB	10	Austin Kendall	GS
WR	13	Isaiah Graham	Sr
WR	14	Praise Okorie	Sr
WR	15	Bub Means	Fr
QB	16	Caleb Holstein	Fr
WR	19	Samuel Emilus	GS
RB	21	Keyon Henry-Brooks	So
RB	22	Charvis Thornton	Fr
RB	23	Harlan Dixon	Fr

Defense

Pos.	#	Name	Class
DB	0	Baylen Buchannan	GS
DB	1	Khalil Ladler	GS
DB	2	Zeno Hannibal	Sr
LB	3	Trey Baldwin	Sr
DB	4	BeeJay Williamson	So
DB	7	Jaiden Cole	Jr
DB	9	Elijah Hamilton	GS
LB	10	Khiry Morrison	Fr
DB	11	Cedric Woods	Fr
DB	17	Broderick Calhoun	So
DB	18	Myles Mason	Jr
LB	19	Taz Marshall	Fr
DL	20	Kershawn Fisher	Fr
DB	21	Dallas Taylor-Cortez	So

Special teams

Pos.	#	Name	Class
K, P	30	Cesar Barajas	GS
K, P	34	Austin McCready	Fr
K, P	34	Jacob Barnes	Fr
K, P	36	Caleb Phillips	Fr
P	38	Arlind Bengu	Fr
DS	41	Reeves Blankenship	Jr
DS	66	Noah White	So

Head coach

- Skip Holtz

Coordinators/assistant coaches

- Joe Sloan
  Offensive coordinator/Quarterbacks
- David Blackwell
  Defensive coordinator/Linebackers
- Dennis Smith
  Special teams coordinator/Outside linebackers
- John Allen
  Outside receivers
- Trey Holtz
  Inside receivers
- Dave DeGuglielmo
  Offensive line
- Brock Hayes
  Running backs
- Anthony Camp
  Defensive line
- Perry Carter
  Cornerbacks
- David Mackie
  Safeties
- Kurt Hester
  Strength and conditioning

Legend

- (C) Team captain
- (S) Suspended
- (I) Ineligible
- Injured
- Redshirt

Roster
Last update: December 9, 2023

== Game summaries ==
=== At Mississippi State ===
Louisiana Tech Bulldogs at Mississippi State Bulldogs – Game summary

Quarter	1	2	3	4	Total
LT Bulldogs	7	14	10	3	34
MSST Bulldogs	14	0	0	21	35

at Davis Wade Stadium, Starkville, Mississippi

- Date: September 4
- Game time: 3:00 p.m. CDT
- Game weather: Sunny, 87 °F (31 °C)
- Game attendance: 44,669
- Referee: James Carter
- TV announcers (ESPNU): John Schriffen and Rene Ingoglia
- Box score, Recap

Game information
First quarter
- MSST – Jo'quavious Marks 1-yard pass from Will Rogers (Brandon Ruiz kick), 8:09. Mississippi State 7–0. Drive: 7 plays, 40 yards, 3:41.
- MSST – Jamire Calvin 20-yard pass from Will Rogers (Brandon Ruiz kick), 0:35. Mississippi State 14–0. Drive: 3 plays, 33 yards, 1:45.
- LT – Bub Means 72-yard pass from Austin Kendall (Jacob Barnes kick), 0:00. Mississippi State 14–7. Drive: 2 plays, 75 yards, 0:35.

Second quarter

- LT – Austin Kendall 59-yard run (Jacob Barnes kick), 11:55. Tied 14–14. Drive: 3 plays, 68 yards, 0:58.
- LT – Smoke Harris 24-yard pass from Austin Kendall (Jacob Barnes kick), 3:06. Louisiana Tech 21–14. Drive: 3 plays, 31 yards, 1:17.

Third quarter

- LT – Jacob Barnes 20-yard field goal, 3:06. Louisiana Tech 24–14. Drive: 7 plays, 38 yards, 3:18.
- LT – Trey Baldwin 35-yard interception return (Jacob Barnes kick), 1:50. Louisiana Tech 31–14.

Fourth quarter

- LT – Jacob Barnes 33-yard field goal, 13:11. Louisiana Tech 34–14. Drive: 6 plays, 56 yards, 2:36.
- MSST – Jo'quavious Marks 1-yard run (Brandon Ruiz kick), 12:01. Louisiana Tech 34–21. Drive: 3 plays, 21 yards, 0:59.
- MSST – Jo'quavious Marks 5-yard run (Brandon Ruiz kick), 7:24. Louisiana Tech 34–28. Drive: 7 plays, 77 yards, 3:25.
- MSST – Jaden Walley 15-yard pass from Will Rogers (Brandon Ruiz kick), 3:37. Mississippi State 35–34. Drive: 5 plays, 52 yards, 2:30.

Statistics	LT	MSST
First downs	14	22
Total yards	369	435
Rushing yards	101	65
Passing yards	268	370
Turnovers	2	4
Time of possession	25:06	34:54

Team	Category	Player	Statistics
Louisiana Tech	Passing	Austin Kendall	20/36, 269 yards, 2 TD, INT
Louisiana Tech	Rushing	Austin Kendall	5 rushes, 68 yards, TD
Louisiana Tech	Receiving	Bub Means	2 receptions, 94 yards, TD
Mississippi State	Passing	Will Rogers	39/47, 370 yards, 3 TD, INT
Mississippi State	Rushing	Jo'Quavious Marks	12 rushes, 71 yards, 2 TD
Mississippi State	Receiving	Jamire Calvin	3 receptions, 67 yards, TD

=== No. 13 (FCS) Southeastern Louisiana ===
No. 13 (FCS) Southeastern Louisiana Lions at Louisiana Tech Bulldogs – Game summary

Quarter	1	2	3	4	Total
No. 13 (FCS)	7	14	14	7	42
Bulldogs	14	10	14	7	45

at Joe Aillet Stadium, Ruston, Louisiana

- Date: September 11
- Game time: 6:00 p.m. CDT
- Game weather: Sunny
- Game attendance: 15,328
- Referee: Kevin Vicknair
- TV announcers (ESPN3): Lyn Rollins and Chris Mycoskie
- Box score, Recap

Game information
First quarter
- LT – BeeJay Williamson 45-yard interception return (Jacob Barnes kick), 8:16. Bulldogs 7–0.
- SELA – Tim Wilson Jr. 4-yard pass from Cole Kelley (Mateo Rengifo kick), 4:06. Tied 7–7. Drive: 12 plays, 91 yards, 4:02.
- LT – Greg Garner 4-yard run (Jacob Barnes kick), 0:33. Bulldogs 14–7. Drive: 12 plays, 86 yards, 3:27.

Second quarter

- SELA – Taron Jones 2-yard run (Mateo Rengifo kick), 12:11. Tied 14–14. Drive: 6 plays, 75 yards, 3:22.
- LT – Austin Kendall 2-yard run (Jacob Barnes kick), 8:04. Bulldogs 21–14. Drive: 10 plays, 75 yards, 4:07.
- LT – Jacob Barnes 44-yard field goal, 4:33. Bulldogs 24–14. Drive: 6 plays, 9 yards, 2:19.
- SELA – Cole Kelley 1-yard run (Mateo Rengifo kick), 0:22. Bulldogs 24–21. Drive: 14 plays, 91 yards, 4:07.

Third quarter

- LT – Greg Garner 33-yard pass from Kyle Maxwell (Jacob Barnes kick), 12:19. Bulldogs 31–21. Drive: 8 plays, 84 yards, 2:34.
- SELA – C. J. Turner 47-yard pass from Cole Kelley (Mateo Rengifo kick), 11:12. Bulldogs 31–28. Drive: 3 plays, 75 yards, 1:07.
- LT – Greg Garner 1-yard run (Jacob Barnes kick), 8:10. Bulldogs 38–28. Drive: 9 plays, 75 yards, 3:02.
- SELA – Austin Mitchell 9-yard pass from Cole Kelley (Mateo Rengifo kick), 1:33. Bulldogs 38–35. Drive: 12 plays, 75 yards, 6:37.

Fourth quarter

- LT – Tre Harris 21-yard pass from Austin Kendall (Jacob Barnes kick), 9:51. Bulldogs 45–35. Drive: 9 plays, 93 yards, 4:17.
- SELA – Cole Kelley 4-yard run (Mateo Rengifo kick), 4:22. Bulldogs 45–42. Drive: 14 plays, 75 yards, 5:29.

Statistics	SELA	LT
First downs	32	23
Total yards	598	448
Rushing yards	103	198
Passing yards	495	250
Turnovers	3	1
Time of possession	32:48	27:12

Team	Category	Player	Statistics
Southeastern Louisiana	Passing	Cole Kelley	44/59, 495 yards, 3 TD, 2 INT
Southeastern Louisiana	Rushing	Cole Kelley	14 rushes, 42 yards, 2 TD
Southeastern Louisiana	Receiving	C. J. Turner	8 receptions, 131 yards, TD
Louisiana Tech	Passing	Austin Kendall	19/27, 217 yards, TD, INT
Louisiana Tech	Rushing	Marcus Williams Jr.	18 rushes, 99 yards
Louisiana Tech	Receiving	Tre Harris	4 receptions, 72 yards, TD

=== SMU ===
SMU Mustangs at Louisiana Tech Bulldogs – Game summary

Quarter	1	2	3	4	Total
Mustangs	7	9	17	6	39
Bulldogs	7	7	14	9	37

at Joe Aillet Stadium, Ruston, Louisiana

- Date: September 18
- Game time: 2:30 p.m. CDT
- Game weather: Cloudy, 83 °F (28 °C)
- Game attendance: 15,326
- Referee: Patrick Foy
- TV announcers (CBSSN): Chick Hernandez and Ben Leber
- Box score, Recap

Game information
First quarter
- LT – Tre Harris 62-yard pass from Austin Kendall (Jacob Barnes kick), 6:22. Bulldogs 7–0. Drive: 5 plays, 80 yards, 2:12.
- SMU – Rashee Rice 41-yard pass from Tanner Mordecai (Blake Mazza kick), 3:13. Tied 7–7. Drive: 9 plays, 78 yards, 3:04.

Second quarter

- LT – Samuel Emilus 11-yard pass from Austin Kendall (Jacob Barnes kick), 6:49. Bulldogs 14–7. Drive: 13 plays, 99 yards, 6:00.
- SMU – Danny Gray 17-yard pass from Tanner Mordecai (kick blocked), 3:30. Bulldogs 14–13. Drive: 9 plays, 75 yards, 3:19.
- SMU – Blake Mazza 29-yard field goal, 0:00. Mustangs 16–14. Drive: 10 plays, 46 yards, 2:17.

Third quarter

- SMU – Jordan Kerley 18-yard pass from Tanner Mordecai (Blake Mazza kick), 12:09. Mustangs 23–14. Drive: 7 plays, 78 yards, 2:42.
- LT – Tre Harris 11-yard pass from Austin Kendall (Jacob Barnes kick), 10:30. Mustangs 23–21. Drive: 5 plays, 75 yards, 1:39.
- SMU – Blake Mazza 24-yard field goal, 7:55. Mustangs 26–21. Drive: 5 plays, 22 yards, 2:24.
- LT – Austin Kendall 3-yard run (Jacob Barnes kick), 5:25. Bulldogs 28–26. Drive: 6 plays, 75 yards, 2:30.
- SMU – Rashee Rice 5-yard pass from Tanner Mordecai (Blake Mazza kick), 0:24. Mustangs 33–28. Drive: 3 plays, 9 yards, 0:54.

Fourth quarter

- LT – Marcus Williams Jr. 6-yard pass from Austin Kendall (pass failed), 5:07. Bulldogs 34–33. Drive: 9 plays, 70 yards, 4:13.
- LT – Jacob Barnes 47-yard field goal, 0:36. Bulldogs 37–33. Drive: 6 plays, 6 yards, 2:42.
- SMU – Reggie Roberson Jr. 33-yard pass from Tanner Mordecai, 0:00. Mustangs 39–37. Drive: 6 plays, 73 yards, 0:36.

Statistics	SMU	LT
First downs	31	24
Total yards	578	483
Rushing yards	183	132
Passing yards	395	351
Turnovers	0	1
Time of possession	32:37	27:23

Team	Category	Player	Statistics
SMU	Passing	Tanner Mordecai	36/48, 395 yards, 5 TD
SMU	Rushing	Ulysses Bentley IV	13 rushes, 61 yards
SMU	Receiving	Grant Calcaterra	7 receptions, 103 yards
Louisiana Tech	Passing	Austin Kendall	24/40, 351 yards, 4 TD, INT
Louisiana Tech	Rushing	Marcus Williams Jr.	13 rushes, 65 yards
Louisiana Tech	Receiving	Tre Harris	5 receptions, 102 yards, 2 TD

=== North Texas ===
North Texas Mean Green at Louisiana Tech Bulldogs – Game summary

Quarter	1	2	3	4	Total
Mean Green	0	7	0	10	17
Bulldogs	14	10	0	0	24

at Joe Aillet Stadium, Ruston, Louisiana

- Date: September 25
- Game time: 6:00 p.m. CDT
- Game weather: Sunny
- Game attendance: 15,488
- Referee: Scott Hardin
- TV announcers (Stadium): Chris Hassel and Sed Bonner
- Box score, Recap

Game information
First quarter
- LT – Marcus Williams Jr. 2-yard run (Jacob Barnes kick), 11:14. Bulldogs 7–0. Drive: 9 plays, 65 yards, 2:51.
- LT – Marcus Williams Jr. 42-yard run (Jacob Barnes kick), 5:47. Bulldogs 14–0. Drive: 5 plays, 60 yards, 1:56.

Second quarter

- LT – Samuel Emilus 34-yard pass from J. D. Head (Jacob Barnes kick), 12:54. Bulldogs 21–0. Drive: 7 plays, 67 yards, 2:44.
- LT – Jacob Barnes 21-yard field goal, 10:03. Bulldogs 24–0. Drive: 4 plays, -1 yards, 0:47.
- UNT – DeAndre Torrey 3-yard run (Ethan Mooney kick), 0:34. Bulldogs 24–7. Drive: 12 plays, 63 yards, 3:59.

Third quarter

- No scoring plays

Fourth quarter

- UNT – Ethan Mooney 33-yard field goal, 13:25. Bulldogs 24–10. Drive: 7 plays, 17 yards, 2:02.
- UNT – Damon Ward Jr. 8-yard pass from Austin Aune (Ethan Mooney kick), 5:39. Bulldogs 24–17. Drive: 12 plays, 85 yards, 3:39.

Statistics	UNT	LT
First downs	24	20
Total yards	333	286
Rushing yards	241	79
Passing yards	92	207
Turnovers	1	1
Time of possession	29:25	30:35

Team	Category	Player	Statistics
North Texas	Passing	Austin Aune	12/27, 79 yards, TD
North Texas	Rushing	DeAndre Torrey	26 rushes, 119 yards, TD
North Texas	Receiving	Jason Pirtle	4 receptions, 26 yards
Louisiana Tech	Passing	Aaron Allen	14/18, 137 yards
Louisiana Tech	Rushing	Marcus Williams Jr.	17 rushes, 73 yards, 2 TD
Louisiana Tech	Receiving	Samuel Emilus	2 receptions, 69 yards, TD

=== At No. 23 NC State ===
Louisiana Tech Bulldogs at No. 23 NC State Wolfpack – Game summary

Quarter	1	2	3	4	Total
Bulldogs	0	10	3	14	27
No. 23 Wolfpack	7	6	14	7	34

at Carter–Finley Stadium, Raleigh, North Carolina

- Date: October 2
- Game time: 5:00 p.m. CDT/6:00 p.m. EDT
- Game weather: Sunny, 79 °F (26 °C)
- Game attendance: 51,064
- Referee: Gary Patterson
- TV announcers (ACCNX/ESPN+): John Schriffen, Rene Ingoglia, and Tori Petry
- Box score, Recap

Game information
First quarter
- NCST – Christopher Toudle 6-yard pass from Devin Leary (Christopher Dunn kick), 2:18. Wolfpack 7–0. Drive: 10 plays, 91 yards, 5:30.

Second quarter

- LT – Jacob Adams 2-yard pass from Adam Kendall (Jacob Barnes kick), 13:19. Tied 7–7. Drive: 9 plays, 75 yards, 3:59.
- NCST – Christopher Dunn 36-yard field goal, 5:37. Wolfpack 10–7. Drive: 6 plays, 37 yards, 1:55.
- LT – Jacob Barnes 21-yard field goal, 2:12. Tied 10–10. Drive: 7 plays, 72 yards, 3:25.
- NCST – Christopher Dunn 29-yard field goal, 0:02. Wolfpack 13–10. Drive: 7 plays, 57 yards, 0:36.

Third quarter

- NCST – Ricky Person Jr. 24-yard run (Christopher Dunn kick), 10:44. Wolfpack 20–10. Drive: 2 plays, 40 yards, 0:43.
- LT – Jacob Barnes 38-yard field goal, 6:17. Wolfpack 20–13. Drive: 8 plays, 55 yards, 4:27.
- NCST – C. J. Riley 5-yard pass from Devin Leary (Christopher Dunn kick), 3:02. Wolfpack 27–13. Drive: 7 plays, 71 yards, 3:15.

Fourth quarter

- LT – Bub Means 23-yard pass from Austin Kendall (Jacob Barnes kick), 12:10. Wolfpack 27–20. Drive: 5 plays, 68 yards, 1:51.
- NCST – Zonovan Knight 4-yard run (Christopher Dunn kick), 7:45. Wolfpack 34–20. Drive: 8 plays, 72 yards, 4:20.
- LT – Griffin Hebert 14-yard pass from Austin Kendall (Jacob Barnes kick), 4:43. Wolfpack 34–27. Drive: 9 plays, 75 yards, 3:02.

Statistics	LT	NCST
First downs	26	23
Total yards	480	418
Rushing yards	139	167
Passing yards	341	251
Turnovers	2	0
Time of possession	30:41	29:19

Team	Category	Player	Statistics
Louisiana Tech	Passing	Austin Kendall	26/43, 341 yards, 3 TD, 2 INT
Louisiana Tech	Rushing	Austin Kendall	15 rushes, 71 yards
Louisiana Tech	Receiving	Bub Means	5 receptions, 67 yards, TD
NC State	Passing	Devin Leary	22/36, 251 yards, 2 TD
NC State	Rushing	Ricky Person Jr.	15 rushes, 90 yards, TD
NC State	Receiving	Emeka Emezie	4 receptions, 67 yards

=== At UTEP ===
Louisiana Tech Bulldogs at UTEP Miners – Game summary

Quarter	1	2	3	4	Total
Bulldogs	0	3	0	0	3
Miners	14	2	3	0	19

at Sun Bowl, El Paso, Texas

- Date: October 16
- Game time: 8:00 p.m. CDT/7:00 p.m. MDT
- Game weather: Sunny, 73 °F (23 °C)
- Game attendance: 18,468
- Referee: Joe Lehring
- TV: ESPN+
- Box score, Recap

Game information
First quarter
- UTEP – Deion Hankins 16-yard run (Gavin Baechle kick), 9:19. Miners 7–0. Drive: 13 plays, 75 yards, 5:41.
- UTEP – Deion Hankins 4-yard run (Gavin Baechle kick), 6:02. Miners 14–0. Drive: 4 plays, 34 yards, 1:18.

Second quarter

- UTEP – Marcus Williams Jr. tackled in own end zone by Jalen Rudolph, 11:53. Miners 16–0.
- LT – Jacob Barnes 25-yard field goal, 6:56. Miners 16–3. Drive: 9 plays, 56 yards, 3:35.

Third quarter

- UTEP – Gavin Baechle 41-yard field goal, 0:38. Miners 19–3. Drive: 9 plays, 35 yards, 4:29.

Fourth quarter

- No scoring plays

Statistics	LT	UTEP
First downs	14	18
Total yards	288	385
Rushing yards	92	102
Passing yards	196	283
Turnovers	3	4
Time of possession	23:17	36:43

Team	Category	Player	Statistics
Louisiana Tech	Passing	Austin Kendall	14/28, 174 yards, 3 INT
Louisiana Tech	Rushing	Marcus Williams Jr.	7 rushes, 42 yards
Louisiana Tech	Receiving	Marcus Williams Jr.	2 receptions, 59 yards
UTEP	Passing	Gavin Hardison	19/29, 283 yards, INT
UTEP	Rushing	Deion Hankins	15 rushes, 55 yards, 2 TD
UTEP	Receiving	Jacob Cowing	9 receptions, 166 yards

=== No. 24 UTSA ===
No. 24 UTSA Roadrunners at Louisiana Tech Bulldogs – Game summary

Quarter	1	2	3	4	Total
No. 24 Roadrunners	7	14	7	17	45
Bulldogs	10	0	0	6	16

at Joe Aillet Stadium, Ruston, Louisiana

- Date: October 23
- Game time: 6:00 p.m. CDT
- Game weather: Sunny
- Game attendance: 18,314
- Referee: Jonathan Noli
- TV announcers (Stadium): Chris Hassel and Patrick Murray
- Box score, Recap

Game information
First quarter
- LT – Smoke Harris 47-yard pass from Austin Kendall (Jacob Barnes kick), 12:20. Bulldogs 7–0. Drive: 7 plays, 82 yards, 2:35.
- UTSA – Zakhari Franklin 75-yard pass from Frank Harris (Hunter Duplessis kick), 11:44. Tied 7–7. Drive: 3 plays, 75 yards, 0:36.
- LT – Jacob Barnes 35-yard field goal, 3:37. Bulldogs 10–7. Drive: 9 plays, 68 yards, 2:12.

Second quarter

- UTSA – Sincere McCormick 2-yard run (Hunter Duplessis kick), 14:22. Roadrunners 14–10. Drive: 16 plays, 75 yards, 4:10.
- UTSA – Zakhari Franklin 10-yard pass from Frank Harris (Hunter Duplessis kick), 3:12. Roadrunners 21–10. Drive: 12 plays, 72 yards, 4:28.

Third quarter

- UTSA – Dadrian Taylor 51-yard interception return (Hunter Duplessis kick), 12:44. Roadrunners 28–10.

Fourth quarter

- UTSA – Sincere McCormick 47-yard run (Hunter Duplessis kick), 13:46. Roadrunners 35–10. Drive: 5 plays, 87 yards, 1:36.
- UTSA – Sincere McCormick 1-yard run (Hunter Duplessis kick), 12:38. Roadrunners 42–10. Drive: 3 plays, 22 yards, 1:01.
- LT – Samuel Emilus 21-yard pass from Austin Kendall (pass failed), 9:31. Roadrunners 42–16. Drive: 8 plays, 75 yards, 3:07.
- UTSA – Hunter Duplessis 38-yard field goal, 1:06. Roadrunners 45–16. Drive: 7 plays, 36 yards, 4:12.

Statistics	UTSA	LT
First downs	21	22
Total yards	406	401
Rushing yards	213	62
Passing yards	193	339
Turnovers	0	3
Time of possession	27:25	32:35

Team	Category	Player	Statistics
UTSA	Passing	Frank Harris	12/19, 193 yards, 2 TD
UTSA	Rushing	Sincere McCormick	23 rushes, 113 yards, 3 TD
UTSA	Receiving	Zakhari Franklin	5 receptions, 118 yards, 2 TD
Louisiana Tech	Passing	Austin Kendall	23/34, 279 yards, 2 TD, INT
Louisiana Tech	Rushing	Marcus Williams Jr.	13 rushes, 66 yards
Louisiana Tech	Receiving	Smoke Harris	7 receptions, 108 yards, TD

=== At Old Dominion ===
Louisiana Tech Bulldogs at Old Dominion Monarchs – Game summary

Quarter	1	2	3	4	Total
Bulldogs	0	10	3	7	20
Monarchs	0	10	7	6	23

at S.B. Ballard Stadium, Norfolk, Virginia

- Date: October 30
- Game time: 2:30 p.m. CDT/3:30 p.m. EDT
- Game weather: Sunny, 66 °F (19 °C)
- Game attendance: 13,309
- Referee: Jonathan Noli
- TV announcers (CBSSN): Chris Hassel and Sed Bonner
- Box score, Recap

Game information
First quarter
- No scoring plays

Second quarter

- ODU – Nick Rice 36-yard field goal, 3:56. Monarchs 3–0. Drive: 8 plays, 49 yards, 4:15.
- LT – Isaiah Graham 32-yard pass from Austin Kendall (Jacob Barnes kick), 1:13. Bulldogs 7–3. Drive: 7 plays, 80 yards, 2:39.
- ODU – LaMareon James 100-yard kickoff return (Nick Rice kick), 0:58. Monarchs 10–7.
- LT – Jacob Barnes 30-yard field goal, 0:00. Tied 10–10. Drive: 6 plays, 66 yards, 0:49.

Third quarter

- ODU – Zack Kuntz 5-yard pass from Hayden Wolff (Nick Rice kick), 10:19. Monarchs 17–10. Drive: 9 plays, 55 yards, 3:02.
- LT – Jacob Barnes 44-yard field goal, 6:51. Monarchs 17–13. Drive: 7 plays, 13 yards, 3:18.

Fourth quarter

- LT – Marcus Williams Jr. 7-yard run (Jacob Barnes kick), 12:01. Bulldogs 20–17. Drive: 5 plays, 43 yards, 0:39.
- ODU – Nick Rice 29-yard field goal, 1:52. Tied 20–20. Drive: 20 plays, 58 yards, 10:02.
- ODU – Nick Rice 46-yard field goal, 0:00. Monarchs 23–20. Drive: 5 plays, 26 yards, 0:28.

Statistics	LT	ODU
First downs	15	20
Total yards	335	311
Rushing yards	59	162
Passing yards	276	149
Turnovers	0	2
Time of possession	24:21	35:39

Team	Category	Player	Statistics
Louisiana Tech	Passing	Austin Kendall	22/36, 253 yards, TD
Louisiana Tech	Rushing	Marcus Williams Jr.	14 rushes, 42 yards, TD
Louisiana Tech	Receiving	Smoke Harris	7 receptions, 63 yards
Old Dominion	Passing	Hayden Wolff	23/34, 149 yards, TD, INT
Old Dominion	Rushing	Blake Watson	25 rushes, 108 yards
Old Dominion	Receiving	Zack Kuntz	8 receptions, 67 yards, TD

=== At UAB ===
Louisiana Tech Bulldogs at UAB Blazers – Game summary

Quarter	1	2	3	4	Total
Bulldogs	7	14	0	17	38
Blazers	7	17	7	21	52

at Protective Stadium, Birmingham, Alabama

- Date: November 6
- Game time: 11:00 a.m. CDT
- Game weather: Sunny
- Game attendance: 21,261
- Referee: Rodney Burnette
- TV announcers (CBSSN): Chick Hernandez and Randy Cross
- Box score, Recap

Statistics	LT	UAB
First downs		
Total yards		
Rushing yards		
Passing yards		
Turnovers		
Time of possession		

Team	Category	Player	Statistics
Louisiana Tech	Passing		
Louisiana Tech	Rushing		
Louisiana Tech	Receiving		
UAB	Passing		
UAB	Rushing		
UAB	Receiving		

=== Charlotte ===
Charlotte 49ers at Louisiana Tech Bulldogs – Game summary

Quarter	1	2	3	4	Total
49ers	0	7	10	15	32
Bulldogs	7	7	14	14	42

at Joe Aillet Stadium, Ruston, Louisiana

- Date: November 13
- Game time: 2:30 p.m. CST
- Game weather: 58 °F (14 °C) • Weather: Sunny • Wind: 0 MPH
- Game attendance: 14,068
- Referee: Ed Ardito
- TV announcers (Stadium): Chris Hassel and Sed Bonner
- Box score, Recap

Game information
First quarter
- LTECH – Marcus Williams Jr. 2-yard run (Jacob Barnes kick), 3:16. Bulldogs 7–0. Drive: 16 plays, 98 yards, 8:12.

Second quarter

- CHAR – Shadrick Byrd 1-yard run (Jonathan Cruz kick), 5:55. Tied 7–7. Drive: 10 plays, 39 yards, 5:27.
- LTECH – Marcus Williams Jr. 8-yard run (Jacob Barnes kick), 1:38. Bulldogs 14–7. Drive: 10 plays, 54 yards, 4:17.

Third quarter

- LTECH – Marcus Williams Jr. 6-yard run (Jacob Barnes kick), 12:58. Bulldogs 21–7. Drive: 5 plays, 75 yards, 2:02.
- CHAR – Jonathan Cruz 26-yard field goal, 9:06. Bulldogs 21–10. Drive: 10 plays, 70 yards, 3:47.
- LTECH – Isaiah Graham 32-yard pass from Aaron Allen (Jacob Barnes kick), 7:22. Bulldogs 28–10. Drive: 4 plays, 75 yards, 1:44.
- CHAR – Chris Reynolds 12-yard run (Jonathan Cruz kick), 3:52. Bulldogs 28–17. Drive: 9 plays, 75 yards, 3:30.

Fourth quarter

- LTECH – Smoke Harris 17-yard pass from Aaron Allen (Jacob Barnes kick), 13:36. Bulldogs 35–17. Drive: 10 plays, 72 yards, 5:14.
- CHAR – Keith Pearson 18-yard pass from Chris Reynolds (Chris Reynolds pass to Keith Pearson for Two-Point Conversion), 12:18. Bulldogs 35–25. Drive: 4 plays, 75 yards, 1:18.
- LTECH – Marcus Williams Jr. 25-yard run (Jacob Barnes kick), 11:06. Bulldogs 42–25. Drive: 3 plays, 46 yards, 1:12.
- CHAR – Keith Pearson 21-yard pass from Chris Reynolds (Jonathan Cruz kick), 8:44. Bulldogs 42–32. Drive: 7 plays, 75 yards, 2:22.

Statistics	CLT	LT
First downs	28	28
Total yards	548	504
Rushing yards	100	180
Passing yards	448	324
Turnovers	1	1
Time of possession	27:31	32:29

Team	Category	Player	Statistics
Charlotte	Passing	Chris Reynolds	25/42, 448 yards, 2 TD, INT
Charlotte	Rushing	ChaVon McEachern	5 carries, 38 yards
Charlotte	Receiving	Keith Pearson	6 receptions, 150 yards, 2 TD
Louisiana Tech	Passing	Aaron Allen	21/27, 324 yards, 2 TD, INT
Louisiana Tech	Rushing	Marcus Williams Jr.	29 carries, 131 yards, 4 TD
Louisiana Tech	Receiving	Smoke Harris	8 receptions, 98 yards, TD

=== Southern Miss ===
Southern Miss Golden Eagles at Louisiana Tech Bulldogs – Game summary

Quarter	1	2	3	4	Total
Golden Eagles	7	14	0	14	35
Bulldogs	3	6	0	10	19

at Joe Aillet Stadium, Ruston, Louisiana

- Date: November 19
- Game time: 7:00 p.m. CST
- Game weather: Sunny
- Game attendance: 10,410
- Referee: Jonathan Noli
- TV announcers (CBSSN): Chris Lewis and Corey Chavous
- Box score, Recap

Statistics	USM	LT
First downs	17	14
Total yards	294	250
Rushing yards	184	150
Passing yards	110	100
Turnovers	3	5
Time of possession	35:06	24:54

Team	Category	Player	Statistics
Southern Miss	Passing	Frank Gore Jr.	4/8, 75 yards, 2 TD, INT
Southern Miss	Rushing	Dajon Richard	22 carries, 120 yards
Southern Miss	Receiving	Jason Brownlee	5 receptions, 67 yards, 2 TD
Louisiana Tech	Passing	Aaron Allen	11/26, 100 yards, 2 INT
Louisiana Tech	Rushing	Marcus Williams Jr.	17 carries, 76 yards
Louisiana Tech	Receiving	Smoke Harris	4 receptions, 48 yards

=== At Rice ===
Louisiana Tech Bulldogs at Rice Owls – Game summary

Quarter	1	2	3	4	Total
Bulldogs	10	0	14	7	31
Owls	7	7	7	14	35

at Rice Stadium, Houston, Texas

- Date: November 27
- Game time: 12:00 p.m. CST
- Game weather: Sunny
- Game attendance: 15,832
- Referee: Joe Lehring
- TV announcers (ESPN+): Matt Pedersen and Stanford Routt
- Box score, Recap

Statistics	LT	RICE
First downs		
Total yards		
Rushing yards		
Passing yards		
Turnovers		
Time of possession		

Team	Category	Player	Statistics
Louisiana Tech	Passing		
Louisiana Tech	Rushing		
Louisiana Tech	Receiving		
Rice	Passing		
Rice	Rushing		
Rice	Receiving		
