= 2021 North Texas Mean Green football team =

American college football season

2021 North Texas Mean Green football
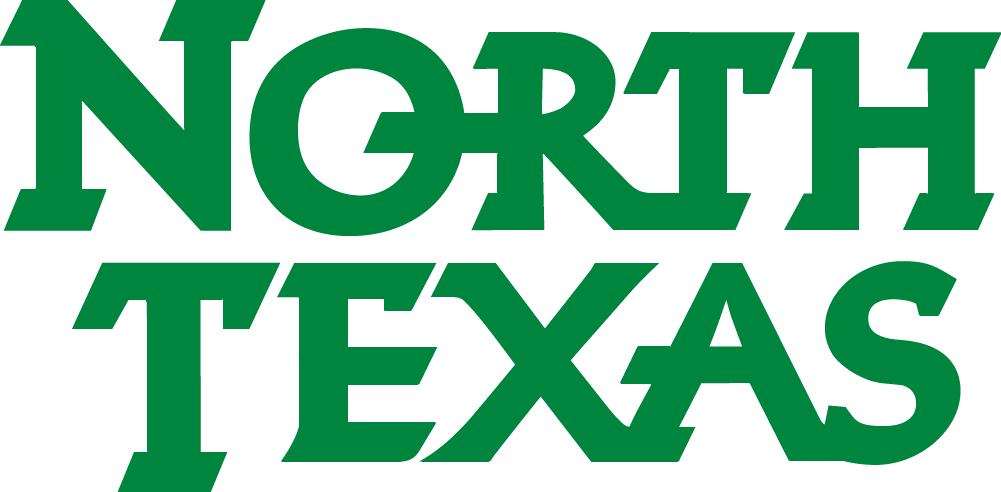

Frisco Football Classic, L 14–27 vs. Miami (OH)
- Conference: Conference USA
- West Division
- Record: 6–7 (5–3 C-USA)
- Head coach: Seth Littrell (6th season)
- Offensive coordinator: Mike Bloesch (2nd season)
- Co-offensive coordinator: Tommy Mainord (3rd season)
- Offensive scheme: Spread
- Defensive coordinator: Phil Bennett (1st season)
- Base defense: 4–2–5
- Home stadium: Apogee Stadium

2021 Conference USA football standings
| | Conf. | | | Overall |
| Team | W | | L | W | | L |
|---|---|---|---|---|---|---|
East Division
| Western Kentucky xy | 7 | – | 1 | 9 | – | 5 |
| Marshall | 5 | – | 3 | 7 | – | 6 |
| Old Dominion | 5 | – | 3 | 6 | – | 7 |
| Middle Tennessee | 4 | – | 4 | 7 | – | 6 |
| Florida Atlantic | 3 | – | 5 | 5 | – | 7 |
| Charlotte | 3 | – | 5 | 5 | – | 7 |
| FIU | 0 | – | 8 | 1 | – | 11 |
West Division
| UTSA xy$ | 7 | – | 1 | 12 | – | 2 |
| UAB | 6 | – | 2 | 9 | – | 4 |
| North Texas | 5 | – | 3 | 6 | – | 7 |
| UTEP | 4 | – | 4 | 7 | – | 6 |
| Rice | 3 | – | 5 | 4 | – | 8 |
| Southern Miss | 2 | – | 6 | 3 | – | 9 |
| Louisiana Tech | 2 | – | 6 | 3 | – | 9 |
Championship: UTSA 49, Western Kentucky 41
$ – Conference champion; x – Division champion/co-champions; y – Championship game participant

The 2021 North Texas Mean Green football team represented the University of North Texas as a member of Conference USA (C-USA) during the 2021 NCAA Division I FBS football season. Led by sixth-year head coach Seth Littrell, the Mean Green compiled an overall record of 6–7 with a mark 5–3 in conference play, placing third in C-USA's West Division. North Texas was invited to the inaugural Frisco Football Classic, where the Mean Green lost to the Miami RedHawks. The team played home games at Apogee Stadium in Denton, Texas.

The Mean Green started the season 1–6 before winning five games in a row, including upset victories over UTEP and undefeated, No. 22 UTSA, to finish the regular season at 6–6.

== Schedule ==
| Date | Time | Opponent | Site | TV | Result | Attendance |
|---|---|---|---|---|---|---|
| September 4 | 6:30 p.m. | Northwestern State* | Apogee Stadium; Denton, TX | ESPN3 | W 44–14 | 18,716 |
| September 11 | 6:00 p.m. | at SMU* | Gerald J. Ford Stadium; Dallas, TX (Safeway Bowl) | ESPN+ | L 12–35 | 29,121 |
| September 18 | 6:30 p.m. | UAB | Apogee Stadium; Denton, TX | Stadium | L 6–40 | 17,731 |
| September 25 | 6:30 p.m. | at Louisiana Tech | Joe Aillet Stadium; Ruston, LA | Stadium | L 17–24 | 15,488 |
| October 9 | 3:00 p.m. | at Missouri* | Faurot Field; Columbia, MO | SECN | L 35–48 | 46,985 |
| October 15 | 6:00 p.m. | Marshall | Apogee Stadium; Denton, TX | CBSSN | L 21–49 | 13,123 |
| October 23 | 3:00 p.m. | Liberty* | Apogee Stadium; Denton, TX | ESPN+ | L 26–35 | 13,454 |
| October 30 | 1:00 p.m. | at Rice | Rice Stadium; Houston, TX | ESPN3 | W 30–24 ^{OT} | 17,354 |
| November 6 | 2:00 p.m. | at Southern Miss | M. M. Roberts Stadium; Hattiesburg, MS | ESPN+ | W 38–14 | 22,478 |
| November 13 | 3:00 p.m. | UTEP^{†} | Apogee Stadium; Denton, TX | ESPN+ | W 20–17 | 20,056 |
| November 20 | 6:00 p.m. | at FIU | Riccardo Silva Stadium; Miami, FL | ESPN3 | W 49–7 | 0 |
| November 27 | 1:00 p.m. | No. 22 UTSA | Apogee Stadium; Denton, TX | ESPN+ | W 45–23 | 16,933 |
| December 23 | 2:30 p.m. | vs. Miami (OH)* | Toyota Stadium; Frisco, TX (Frisco Football Classic) | ESPN | L 14–27 | 11,721 |
*Non-conference game; ^{†}Homecoming; Rankings from AP Poll and CFP Rankings after November 24 released prior to game; All times are in Central time

== Preseason ==
=== C-USA media days ===
The Mean Green were predicted to finish in sixth place in the West Division in the Conference USA preseason poll.

== Game summaries ==
=== Northwestern State ===
| | 1 | 2 | 3 | 4 | Total |
|---|---|---|---|---|---|
| Demons | 0 | 14 | 0 | 0 | 14 |
| Mean Green | 7 | 17 | 17 | 3 | 44 |

| Statistics | NWST | UNT |
|---|---|---|
| First downs | 21 | 29 |
| Total yards | 418 | 527 |
| Rushing yards | 261 | 345 |
| Passing yards | 157 | 182 |
| Turnovers | 4 | 2 |
| Time of possession | 32:49 | 27:21 |

| Team | Category | Player | Statistics |
|---|---|---|---|
| Northwestern State | Passing | Kaleb Fletcher | 13/22, 134 yards, TD, INT |
| Northwestern State | Rushing | Scooter Adams | 12 rushes, 92 yards, TD |
| Northwestern State | Receiving | Kendrick Price | 1 reception, 65 yards, TD |
| North Texas | Passing | Jace Rudder | 10/21, 131 yards, TD, 2 INT |
| North Texas | Rushing | DeAndre Torrey | 25 rushes, 244 yards, 3 TD |
| North Texas | Receiving | Roderic Burns | 6 receptions, 114 yards, TD |

=== At SMU ===
| | 1 | 2 | 3 | 4 | Total |
|---|---|---|---|---|---|
| Mean Green | 3 | 3 | 6 | 0 | 12 |
| Mustangs | 0 | 7 | 14 | 14 | 35 |

| Statistics | UNT | SMU |
|---|---|---|
| First downs | 23 | 20 |
| Total yards | 506 | 536 |
| Rushing yards | 122 | 225 |
| Passing yards | 384 | 311 |
| Turnovers | 2 | 4 |
| Time of possession | 36:06 | 23:54 |

| Team | Category | Player | Statistics |
|---|---|---|---|
| North Texas | Passing | Jace Rudder | 32/51, 366 yards, TD, 2 INT |
| North Texas | Rushing | DeAndre Torrey | 16 rushes, 71 yards |
| North Texas | Receiving | Roderic Burns | 12 receptions, 141 yards |
| SMU | Passing | Tanner Mordecai | 21/33, 311 yards, 4 TD, 2 INT |
| SMU | Rushing | Ulysses Bentley IV | 10 rushes, 141 yards, TD |
| SMU | Receiving | Rashee Rice | 4 receptions, 99 yards, TD |

=== UAB ===
| | 1 | 2 | 3 | 4 | Total |
|---|---|---|---|---|---|
| Blazers | 17 | 13 | 3 | 7 | 40 |
| Mean Green | 0 | 0 | 0 | 6 | 6 |

| Statistics | UAB | UNT |
|---|---|---|
| First downs | 17 | 18 |
| Total yards | 407 | 220 |
| Rushing yards | 173 | 121 |
| Passing yards | 234 | 99 |
| Turnovers | 0 | 1 |
| Time of possession | 32:06 | 27:54 |

| Team | Category | Player | Statistics |
|---|---|---|---|
| UAB | Passing | Dylan Hopkins | 6/7, 202 yards, 3 TD |
| UAB | Rushing | Jermaine Brown Jr. | 16 rushes, 58 yards |
| UAB | Receiving | Gerrit Prince | 3 receptions, 136 yards, 2 TD |
| North Texas | Passing | Austin Aune | 8/21, 65 yards |
| North Texas | Rushing | DeAndre Torrey | 24 rushes, 82 yards |
| North Texas | Receiving | Roderic Burns | 2 receptions, 21 yards |

=== At Louisiana Tech ===
| | 1 | 2 | 3 | 4 | Total |
|---|---|---|---|---|---|
| Mean Green | 0 | 7 | 0 | 10 | 17 |
| Bulldogs | 14 | 10 | 0 | 0 | 24 |

| Statistics | UNT | LT |
|---|---|---|
| First downs | 24 | 20 |
| Total yards | 333 | 286 |
| Rushing yards | 241 | 79 |
| Passing yards | 92 | 207 |
| Turnovers | 1 | 1 |
| Time of possession | 29:25 | 30:35 |

| Team | Category | Player | Statistics |
|---|---|---|---|
| North Texas | Passing | Austin Aune | 12/27, 79 yards, TD |
| North Texas | Rushing | DeAndre Torrey | 26 rushes, 119 yards, TD |
| North Texas | Receiving | Jason Pirtle | 4 receptions, 26 yards |
| Louisiana Tech | Passing | Aaron Allen | 14/18, 137 yards |
| Louisiana Tech | Rushing | Marcus Williams Jr. | 17 rushes, 73 yards, 2 TD |
| Louisiana Tech | Receiving | Samuel Emilus | 2 receptions, 69 yards, TD |

=== At Missouri ===
| | 1 | 2 | 3 | 4 | Total |
|---|---|---|---|---|---|
| Mean Green | 0 | 7 | 7 | 21 | 35 |
| Tigers | 14 | 17 | 0 | 17 | 48 |

| Statistics | UNT | MIZ |
|---|---|---|
| First downs | 21 | 22 |
| Total yards | 493 | 474 |
| Rushing yards | 188 | 306 |
| Passing yards | 305 | 168 |
| Turnovers | 4 | 0 |
| Time of possession | 28:12 | 31:48 |

| Team | Category | Player | Statistics |
|---|---|---|---|
| North Texas | Passing | Austin Aune | 16/26, 305 yards, 4 TD, 2 INT |
| North Texas | Rushing | DeAndre Torrey | 24 rushes, 85 yards |
| North Texas | Receiving | Damon Ward Jr. | 2 receptions, 81 yards, TD |
| Missouri | Passing | Connor Bazelak | 22/33, 168 yards, 2 TD |
| Missouri | Rushing | Tyler Badie | 17 rushes, 209 yards, 2 TD |
| Missouri | Receiving | J. J. Hester | 1 reception, 41 yards, TD |

=== Marshall ===
| | 1 | 2 | 3 | 4 | Total |
|---|---|---|---|---|---|
| Thundering Herd | 14 | 28 | 0 | 7 | 49 |
| Mean Green | 0 | 7 | 0 | 14 | 21 |

| Statistics | MRSH | UNT |
|---|---|---|
| First downs | 24 | 18 |
| Total yards | 477 | 411 |
| Rushing yards | 154 | 277 |
| Passing yards | 323 | 134 |
| Turnovers | 2 | 2 |
| Time of possession | 32:14 | 27:46 |

| Team | Category | Player | Statistics |
|---|---|---|---|
| Marshall | Passing | Grant Wells | 24/32, 323 yards, 2 TD, INT |
| Marshall | Rushing | Rasheen Ali | 20 rushes, 109 yards, 2 TD |
| Marshall | Receiving | Xavier Gaines | 5 receptions, 77 yards, TD |
| North Texas | Passing | Austin Aune | 16/31, 121 yards, 2 INT |
| North Texas | Rushing | DeAndre Torrey | 20 rushes, 179 yards, 2 TD |
| North Texas | Receiving | Jason Pirtle | 5 receptions, 35 yards |

=== Liberty ===
| | 1 | 2 | 3 | 4 | Total |
|---|---|---|---|---|---|
| Flames | 0 | 14 | 14 | 7 | 35 |
| Mean Green | 7 | 13 | 6 | 0 | 26 |

| Statistics | LIB | UNT |
|---|---|---|
| First downs | 21 | 29 |
| Total yards | 350 | 454 |
| Rushing yards | 45 | 242 |
| Passing yards | 305 | 212 |
| Turnovers | 0 | 2 |
| Time of possession | 24:10 | 35:50 |

| Team | Category | Player | Statistics |
|---|---|---|---|
| Liberty | Passing | Malik Willis | 12/18, 217 yards, 3 TD |
| Liberty | Rushing | T. J. Green | 5 rushes, 25 yards |
| Liberty | Receiving | C. J. Daniels | 7 receptions, 130 yards, 2 TD |
| North Texas | Passing | Austin Aune | 22/35, 212 yards, TD, 2 INT |
| North Texas | Rushing | Ayo Adeyi | 16 rushes, 99 yards, TD |
| North Texas | Receiving | Damon Ward Jr. | 4 receptions, 57 yards |

=== At Rice ===
| | 1 | 2 | 3 | 4 | OT | Total |
|---|---|---|---|---|---|---|
| Mean Green | 3 | 7 | 7 | 7 | 6 | 30 |
| Owls | 0 | 3 | 7 | 14 | 0 | 24 |

| Statistics | UNT | RICE |
|---|---|---|
| First downs | 20 | 25 |
| Total yards | 314 | 368 |
| Rushing yards | 193 | 97 |
| Passing yards | 121 | 271 |
| Turnovers | 0 | 0 |
| Time of possession | 21:21 | 38:39 |

| Team | Category | Player | Statistics |
|---|---|---|---|
| North Texas | Passing | Austin Aune | 11/22, 121 yards |
| North Texas | Rushing | Austin Aune | 6 rushes, 65 yards |
| North Texas | Receiving | Bryson Jackson | 3 receptions, 50 yards |
| Rice | Passing | Jake Constantin | 16/30, 242 yards, 2 TD |
| Rice | Rushing | Khalan Griffin | 14 rushes, 47 yards |
| Rice | Receiving | Jake Bailey | 10 receptions, 143 yards, TD |

=== At Southern Miss ===
| | 1 | 2 | 3 | 4 | Total |
|---|---|---|---|---|---|
| Mean Green | 0 | 7 | 21 | 10 | 38 |
| Golden Eagles | 14 | 0 | 0 | 0 | 14 |

| Statistics | UNT | USM |
|---|---|---|
| First downs | 25 | 11 |
| Total yards | 537 | 229 |
| Rushing yards | 321 | 113 |
| Passing yards | 216 | 116 |
| Turnovers | 1 | 2 |
| Time of possession | 34:14 | 25:46 |

| Team | Category | Player | Statistics |
|---|---|---|---|
| North Texas | Passing | Austin Aune | 16/30, 216 yards, INT |
| North Texas | Rushing | Isaiah Johnson | 17 rushes, 119 yards, TD |
| North Texas | Receiving | Detraveon Brown | 4 receptions, 85 yards |
| Southern Miss | Passing | Jake Lange | 17/25, 116 yards, TD |
| Southern Miss | Rushing | Frank Gore Jr. | 12 rushes, 82 yards |
| Southern Miss | Receiving | Jason Brownlee | 4 receptions, 53 yards, TD |

=== UTEP ===
| | 1 | 2 | 3 | 4 | Total |
|---|---|---|---|---|---|
| Miners | 0 | 7 | 0 | 10 | 17 |
| Mean Green | 0 | 3 | 14 | 3 | 20 |

| Statistics | UTEP | UNT |
|---|---|---|
| First downs | 14 | 22 |
| Total yards | 382 | 423 |
| Rushing yards | 109 | 183 |
| Passing yards | 273 | 240 |
| Turnovers | 1 | 0 |
| Time of possession | 29:45 | 30:15 |

| Team | Category | Player | Statistics |
|---|---|---|---|
| UTEP | Passing | Gavin Hardison | 15/29, 273 yards, TD, INT |
| UTEP | Rushing | Ronald Awatt | 17 rushes, 85 yards, TD |
| UTEP | Receiving | Jacob Cowing | 5 receptions, 174 yards, TD |
| North Texas | Passing | Austin Aune | 15/33, 240 yards, TD |
| North Texas | Rushing | DeAndre Torrey | 18 rushes, 81 yards |
| North Texas | Receiving | Roderic Burns | 5 receptions, 93 yards, TD |

=== At FIU ===
| | 1 | 2 | 3 | 4 | Total |
|---|---|---|---|---|---|
| Mean Green | 7 | 28 | 14 | 0 | 49 |
| Panthers | 0 | 0 | 7 | 0 | 7 |

| Statistics | UNT | FIU |
|---|---|---|
| First downs | 25 | 12 |
| Total yards | 611 | 245 |
| Rushing yards | 378 | 58 |
| Passing yards | 233 | 187 |
| Turnovers | 0 | 1 |
| Time of possession | 31:11 | 28:49 |

| Team | Category | Player | Statistics |
|---|---|---|---|
| North Texas | Passing | Austin Aune | 6/12, 219 yards, 2 TD |
| North Texas | Rushing | DeAndre Torrey | 18 rushes, 109 yards, 2 TD |
| North Texas | Receiving | Roderic Burns | 3 receptions, 106 yards, TD |
| FIU | Passing | Max Bortenschlager | 15/32, 167 yards, TD, INT |
| FIU | Rushing | Shaun Peterson Jr. | 5 rushes, 30 yards |
| FIU | Receiving | Tyrese Chambers | 3 receptions, 79 yards, TD |

=== No. 22 UTSA ===
| | 1 | 2 | 3 | 4 | Total |
|---|---|---|---|---|---|
| No. 22 Roadrunners | 3 | 10 | 0 | 10 | 23 |
| Mean Green | 17 | 14 | 14 | 0 | 45 |

| Statistics | UTSA | UNT |
|---|---|---|
| First downs | 16 | 27 |
| Total yards | 366 | 456 |
| Rushing yards | 205 | 340 |
| Passing yards | 161 | 116 |
| Turnovers | 3 | 2 |
| Time of possession | 23:16 | 36:44 |

| Team | Category | Player | Statistics |
|---|---|---|---|
| UTSA | Passing | Eddie Lee Marburger | 2/4, 74 yards, TD |
| UTSA | Rushing | Frank Harris | 10 rushes, 97 yards, TD |
| UTSA | Receiving | Tre'Von Bradley | 1 reception, 67 yards, TD |
| North Texas | Passing | Austin Aune | 10/17, 116 yards |
| North Texas | Rushing | Ikaika Ragsdale | 20 rushes, 146 yards, 2 TD |
| North Texas | Receiving | Khatib Lyles | 3 receptions, 50 yards |

=== Vs. Miami (OH)—Frisco Football Classic ===
| | 1 | 2 | 3 | 4 | Total |
|---|---|---|---|---|---|
| Mean Green | 7 | 7 | 0 | 0 | 14 |
| RedHawks | 10 | 10 | 7 | 0 | 27 |

| Statistics | UNT | MIA |
|---|---|---|
| First downs | 18 | 26 |
| Total yards | 317 | 431 |
| Rushing yards | 89 | 203 |
| Passing yards | 228 | 228 |
| Turnovers | 2 | 0 |
| Time of possession | 21:39 | 38:21 |

| Team | Category | Player | Statistics |
|---|---|---|---|
| North Texas | Passing | Austin Aune | 15/32, 228 yards, 2 INT |
| North Texas | Rushing | Austin Aune | 9 rushes, 28 yards, TD |
| North Texas | Receiving | Roderic Burns | 4 receptions, 87 yards |
| Miami | Passing | Brett Gabbert | 22/31, 228 yards, 2 TD |
| Miami | Rushing | Kenny Tracy | 14 rushes, 92 yards, TD |
| Miami | Receiving | Jack Sorenson | 7 receptions, 116 yards |

== Personnel ==
2021 North Texas Mean Green football team roster
Players
Coaches
Offense

| Pos. | # | Name | Class |
|---|---|---|---|
| RB | 27 | Oscar Adaway III | Fr |
| RB | 39 | Ayo Adeyi | Fr |
| TE | 89 | Asher Alberding | Fr |
| QB | 2 | Austin Aune | So |
| TE | 40 | Edward Bautista | Fr |
| OL | 65 | Gabe Blair | Fr |
| OL | 70 | Kade Bond | Fr |
| OL | 56 | Jacob Brammer | Jr |
| OL | 73 | Cole Brown | So |
| WR | 11 | Detraveon Brown | Fr |
| OL | 79 | John Brunner | Fr |
| WR | 14 | Roderick Burns | So |
| WR | 5 | Tommy Bush | So |
| OL | 68 | Daxton Byers | Fr |
| OL | 78 | Daizion Carroll | So |
| OL | 60 | Chris Cassiday | Fr |
| QB | 15 | Bryce Drummond | Fr |
| OL | 64 | Jett Duncan | Fr |
| OL | 74 | Nick Gallo | So |
| QB | 8 | Amani Gilmore | Fr |
| WR | 20 | Evan Greene | Fr |
| TE | 30 | Var'Keyes Gumms | Fr |
| WR | 0 | Bryson Jackson | So |
| OL | 52 | Dane Jackson | Fr |
| RB | 21 | Keith Jackson | Fr |
| WR | 19 | Caleb Johnson | Fr |
| RB | 23 | Isaiah Johnson | Fr |
| TE | 46 | Xzavier Kauti | Fr |
| TE | 84 | Christian Lee | Fr |
| WR | 13 | Khatib Lyles | Fr |
| QB | 17 | Kason Martin | So |
| WR | 80 | Zhighlil McMillan | Fr |
| OL | 77 | Kaci Moreka | So |
| WR | 18 | Dorian Morris | Fr |
| OL | 72 | Manase Mose | Jr |
| RB | 44 | Dawson Nobriga | So |
| OL | 66 | Febechi Nwaiwu | Fr |
| TE | 88 | Jason Pirtle | Sr |
| RB | 25 | Ikaika Ragsdale | Fr |
| OL | 62 | Caden Reeves | Fr |
| TE | 87 | Jake Roberts | Fr |
| QB | 10 | Jace Ruder | So |
| WR | 16 | Jyaire Shorter | So |
| WR | 6 | Loronzo Thompson | Fr |
| RB | 3 | DeAndre Torrey | Sr |
| OL | 58 | Teeshaun Turpin | Jr |
| WR | 83 | Damon Ward | Fr |

Defense

| Pos. | # | Name | Class |
|---|---|---|---|
| LB | 46 | Grady Brewer | Fr |
| LB | 19 | Jordan Brown | Fr |
| DT | 93 | Roderick Brown | Fr |
| DL | 3 | Caleb Colvin | Sr |
| DB | 22 | Keelan Crosby | So |
| LB | 47 | Jacob Daulong | Jr |
| DB | 8 | John Davis | Jr |
| LB | 1 | K. D. Davis | Jr |
| LB | 5 | Tyrele Davis | Sr |
| DL | 99 | Kenneth Dotson | Fr |
| LB | 25 | Sean-Thomas Faulkner | Jr |
| DB | 2 | Deshawn Gaddie | So |
| DL | 54 | Kevin Greene | Fr |
| DB | 41 | Alphie Guillory | Fr |
| DB | 29 | Braelon Hill | Jr |
| DE | 42 | Kameron Hill | Sr |
| LB | 34 | Kyleb Howell | Sr |
| DL | 94 | Kalvin Hutchings | So |
| DL | 96 | Enoch Jackson | Fr |
| LB | 37 | Taylor Jacobs | Fr |
| LB | 40 | Jacobi Johnson | Fr |
| DB | 31 | Robert Johnson | Fr |
| DL | 90 | Ta'Shoyn Johnson | Fr |
| LB | 15 | Carson Kropp | So |
| DL | 91 | Dayton LeBlanc | So |
| LB | 59 | Sifa Leota | Fr |
| LB | 45 | Landon Maston | Jr |
| DL | 98 | Davontae McCrae | Jr |
| LB | 20 | Cole McCrary | So |
| DE | 11 | Gabriel Murphy | Fr |
| DE | 9 | Grayson Murphy | Fr |
| DB | 38 | Jordan Nichols | Fr |
| LB | 30 | Larry Nixon III | So |
| DL | 97 | Dion Novil | Sr |
| DB | 43 | Trey Perdue | Fr |
| DL | 16 | Jonathan Pickett | Fr |
| DL | 95 | Kortlin Rausaw | Fr |
| DB | 13 | Jordan Rucker | So |
| DB | 10 | Makyle Sanders | Sr |
| LB | 44 | Blake Slaughter | Fr |
| DB | 36 | Jaylen Smith | Fr |
| DB | 7 | Upton Stout | Fr |
| DB | 26 | Ridge Texada | Fr |
| DL | 51 | Fatafehi Vailea | Fr |
| DL | 50 | Trent Ward | Fr |
| DB | 27 | Harold West | Fr |
| DB | 24 | Quinn Whitlock | Jr |
| DB | 17 | Cinque Williams | Fr |
| DB | 4 | Dillion Williams | Fr |
| LB | 21 | Kevin Wood | So |
| LB | 35 | Chris Wright | Fr |

Special teams

| Pos. | # | Name | Class |
|---|---|---|---|
| K | 49 | Aaron Beckham | Fr |
| DS | 29 | Nate Durham | Jr |
| K | 48 | Caden Gilmore | Fr |
| P | 47 | Caden McNeese | Fr |
| K | 0 | Ethan Mooney | Jr |
| DS | 57 | Brandon Oldham | Fr |
| P | 32 | Bernardo Rodriguez | Jr |

Head coach

- Seth Littrell

Coordinators/assistant coaches

- Tommy Mainord
  Associate head coach/co-offensive coordinator/Receivers
- Mike Bloesch
  Offensive coordinator/offensive line
- Phil Bennett
  Defensive coordinator/safeties
- Patrick Cobbs
  Running backs
- Jim Gush
  Linebackers
- Jarred Holley
  Cornerbacks
- Blake Joseph
  Quarterbacks
- Adrian Mayes
  Tight ends
- Matt Passwaters
  Defensive line
- Chris Petrilli
  Outside linebackers/Special teams
- Steven Haunga
  Offensive quality control
- Zack Womack
  Strength and conditioning
- Ethan Gold
  Assistant strength and conditioning

Legend

- (C) Team captain
- (S) Suspended
- (I) Ineligible
- Injured
- Redshirt

Roster
