= 2021 Rice Owls football team =

American college football season

2021 Rice Owls football
- Conference: Conference USA
- West Division
- Record: 4–8 (3–5 C-USA)
- Head coach: Mike Bloomgren (4th season)
- Offensive coordinator: Marques Tuiasosopo (1st season)
- Offensive scheme: Pro-style
- Defensive coordinator: Brian Smith (4th season)
- Base defense: Multiple 3–4
- Home stadium: Rice Stadium

2021 Conference USA football standings
| | Conf. | | | Overall |
| Team | W | | L | W | | L |
|---|---|---|---|---|---|---|
East Division
| Western Kentucky xy | 7 | – | 1 | 9 | – | 5 |
| Marshall | 5 | – | 3 | 7 | – | 6 |
| Old Dominion | 5 | – | 3 | 6 | – | 7 |
| Middle Tennessee | 4 | – | 4 | 7 | – | 6 |
| Florida Atlantic | 3 | – | 5 | 5 | – | 7 |
| Charlotte | 3 | – | 5 | 5 | – | 7 |
| FIU | 0 | – | 8 | 1 | – | 11 |
West Division
| UTSA xy$ | 7 | – | 1 | 12 | – | 2 |
| UAB | 6 | – | 2 | 9 | – | 4 |
| North Texas | 5 | – | 3 | 6 | – | 7 |
| UTEP | 4 | – | 4 | 7 | – | 6 |
| Rice | 3 | – | 5 | 4 | – | 8 |
| Southern Miss | 2 | – | 6 | 3 | – | 9 |
| Louisiana Tech | 2 | – | 6 | 3 | – | 9 |
Championship: UTSA 49, Western Kentucky 41
$ – Conference champion; x – Division champion/co-champions; y – Championship game participant

The 2021 Rice Owls football team represented Rice University in the 2021 NCAA Division I FBS football season. The Owls played their home games at Rice Stadium in Houston, Texas, and competed in the West Division of Conference USA (C–USA). They were led by fourth-year head coach Mike Bloomgren.

== Schedule ==
| Date | Time | Opponent | Site | TV | Result | Attendance |
|---|---|---|---|---|---|---|
| September 4 | 1:00 p.m. | at Arkansas* | Donald W. Reynolds Razorback Stadium; Fayetteville, AR | ESPN+/SECN+ | L 17–38 | 60,065 |
| September 11 | 5:30 p.m. | Houston* | Rice Stadium; Houston, TX (rivalry) | CBSSN | L 7–44 | 26,253 |
| September 18 | 7:00 p.m. | at Texas* | Darrell K Royal–Texas Memorial Stadium; Austin, TX (rivalry) | LHN | L 0–58 | 91,978 |
| September 25 | 5:30 p.m. | Texas Southern* | Rice Stadium; Houston, TX | ESPN3 | W 48–34 | 18,326 |
| October 2 | 5:30 p.m. | Southern Miss | Rice Stadium; Houston, TX | ESPN3 | W 24–19 | 16,031 |
| October 16 | 5:00 p.m. | at UTSA | Alamodome; San Antonio, TX | ESPN+ | L 0–45 | 27,515 |
| October 23 | 2:30 p.m. | at UAB | Protective Stadium; Birmingham, AL | ESPN+ | W 30–24 | 24,845 |
| October 30 | 1:00 p.m. | North Texas^{†} | Rice Stadium; Houston, TX | ESPN3 | L 24–30 ^{OT} | 17,354 |
| November 6 | 2:30 p.m. | at Charlotte | Jerry Richardson Stadium; Charlotte, NC | ESPN+ | L 24–31 ^{OT} | 16,050 |
| November 13 | 1:00 p.m. | Western Kentucky | Rice Stadium; Houston, TX | ESPN+ | L 21–42 | 17,883 |
| November 20 | 3:00 p.m. | at UTEP | Sun Bowl; El Paso, TX | ESPN+ | L 28–38 | 10,097 |
| November 27 | 12:00 p.m. | Louisiana Tech | Rice Stadium; Houston, TX | ESPN+ | W 35–31 | 15,832 |
*Non-conference game; ^{†}Homecoming; Rankings from AP Poll released prior to the game; All times are in Central time
