= 2021 UAB Blazers football team =

American college football season

2021 UAB Blazers football

Independence Bowl champion

Independence Bowl, W 31–28 vs. BYU
- Conference: Conference USA
- West Division
- Record: 9–4 (6–2 C-USA)
- Head coach: Bill Clark (6th season)
- Offensive coordinator: Bryant Vincent (5th season)
- Offensive scheme: Spread option
- Defensive coordinator: David Reeves (5th season)
- Base defense: 3–3–5
- Home stadium: Protective Stadium

2021 Conference USA football standings
	Conf.			Overall
Team	W		L	W		L
East Division
Western Kentucky xy	7	–	1	9	–	5
Marshall	5	–	3	7	–	6
Old Dominion	5	–	3	6	–	7
Middle Tennessee	4	–	4	7	–	6
Florida Atlantic	3	–	5	5	–	7
Charlotte	3	–	5	5	–	7
FIU	0	–	8	1	–	11
West Division
UTSA xy$	7	–	1	12	–	2
UAB	6	–	2	9	–	4
North Texas	5	–	3	6	–	7
UTEP	4	–	4	7	–	6
Rice	3	–	5	4	–	8
Southern Miss	2	–	6	3	–	9
Louisiana Tech	2	–	6	3	–	9
Championship: UTSA 49, Western Kentucky 41
$ – Conference champion; x – Division champion/co-champions; y – Championship game participant

The 2021 UAB Blazers football team represented the University of Alabama at Birmingham (UAB) as a member of the West Division in Conference USA (C-USA) during the 2021 NCAA Division I FBS football season. Led by Bill Clark in his sixth and final season as head coach, the Blazers compiled an overall record of 9–4 with a mark of 6–2 in conference play, placing second in C-USA's West Division. UAB was invited to the Independence Bowl, where the Blazers defeated BYU. The team played home games at the newly-opened Protective Stadium in Birmingham, Alabama.

== Schedule ==
UAB announced its 2021 football schedule on January 27, 2021. The 2021 schedule consisted of five home, six away, and one neutral site game in the regular season.

Date	Time	Opponent	Site	TV	Result	Attendance
September 1	6:30 p.m.	vs. No. 10 (FCS) Jacksonville State*	Cramton Bowl; Montgomery, AL (Montgomery Kickoff)	ESPN	W 31–0	9,122
September 11	2:30 p.m.	at No. 2 Georgia*	Sanford Stadium; Athens, GA	ESPN2	L 7–56	92,746
September 18	6:30 p.m.	at North Texas	Apogee Stadium; Denton, TX	Stadium	W 40–6	17,731
September 25	7:00 p.m.	at Tulane*	Yulman Stadium; New Orleans, LA	ESPN+	W 28–21	16,023
October 2	6:00 p.m.	Liberty*	Protective Stadium; Birmingham, AL	CBSSN	L 12–36	37,167
October 9	2:30 p.m.	Florida Atlantic	Protective Stadium; Birmingham, AL	Stadium	W 31–14	25,191
October 16	2:30 p.m.	at Southern Miss	M. M. Roberts Stadium; Hattiesburg, MS	Stadium	W 34–0	21,514
October 23	2:30 p.m.	Rice^{†}	Protective Stadium; Birmingham, AL	ESPN+	L 24–30	24,845
November 6	11:00 a.m.	Louisiana Tech	Protective Stadium; Birmingham, AL	CBSSN	W 52–38	21,261
November 13	2:30 p.m.	at Marshall	Joan C. Edwards Stadium; Huntington, WV	CBSSN	W 21–14	19,329
November 20	2:30 p.m.	at No. 22 UTSA	Alamodome; San Antonio, TX	ESPN+	L 31–34	35,147
November 26	1:00 p.m.	UTEP	Protective Stadium; Birmingham, AL	ESPN+	W 42–25	19,683
December 18	2:30 p.m.	vs. No. 13 BYU*	Independence Stadium; Shreveport, LA (Independence Bowl)	ABC	W 31–28	26,276
*Non-conference game; ^{†}Homecoming; Rankings from AP Poll (and CFP Rankings, after November 2) - Released prior to game; All times are in Central time
