= Bub Means =

American football player (born 2001)

No. 32 – Arizona Cardinals
- Position: Wide receiver
- Roster status: Practice squad

Personal information
- Born: January 10, 2001 (age 25); Las Vegas, Nevada, U.S.
- Listed height: 6 ft 2 in (1.88 m)
- Listed weight: 215 lb (98 kg)

Career information
- High school: Lovejoy (Lovejoy, Georgia)
- College: Tennessee (2019); Louisiana Tech (2020–2021); Pittsburgh (2022–2023)
- NFL draft: 2024: 5th round, 170th overall pick

Career history
- New Orleans Saints (2024–2025); Cleveland Browns (2026)*; Kansas City Chiefs (2026)*; Arizona Cardinals (2026–present)*
- * Offseason or practice squad member only

Career NFL statistics as of 2024
- Receptions: 9
- Receiving yards: 118
- Receiving touchdowns: 1
- Stats at Pro Football Reference

Jerrod "Bub" Means (born January 10, 2001) is an American professional football wide receiver of the Arizona Cardinals of the National Football League (NFL). He played college football for the Tennessee Volunteers, Louisiana Tech Bulldogs, and Pittsburgh Panthers.

== Early life ==
Means attended Lovejoy High School in Lovejoy, Georgia. In two seasons, he recorded nearly 900 yards and 11 touchdown receptions. A three-star recruit, Means committed to play college football at the University of Tennessee over offers from Northwestern and Rutgers.

== College career ==
After redshirting in 2019 at Tennessee, Means decided to transfer to Louisiana Tech, where would be forced to sit out the 2020 season. Means first saw action at Louisiana Tech in 2021, where he tallied 22 receptions for 430 yards and two touchdowns.

Following the 2021 season, Means announced that he would transfer to Pittsburgh. In his first season with Pittsburgh, he amounted 27 receptions for 401 yards and two touchdowns, including four receptions for 84 yards and a touchdown in a 37–35 Sun Bowl victory over UCLA. The next season, Means hauled in 41 receptions for 721 yards and six touchdowns before declaring for the 2024 NFL draft.

=== Statistics ===
Year	Team	Games	Receiving			
Year	Team	GP	Rec	Yards	Avg	TD
2019	Tennessee	Redshirt (redshirt)				
2020	Louisiana Tech	DNP				
2021	Louisiana Tech	11	22	430	19.5	2
2022	Pittsburgh	13	27	401	14.9	2
2023	Pittsburgh	12	41	721	17.6	6
Career		36	90	1,552	17.2	10

== Professional career ==
Pre-draft measurables
Height	Weight	Arm length	Hand span	Wingspan	40-yard dash	10-yard split	20-yard split	20-yard shuttle	Vertical jump	Broad jump	Bench press
6 ft 1 in (1.85 m)	212 lb (96 kg)	33 1/4 in (0.84 m)	10 1/8 in (0.26 m)	6 ft 7 3/8 in (2.02 m)	4.43 s	1.55 s	2.60 s	4.40 s	39.5 in (1.00 m)	10 ft 2 in (3.10 m)	19 reps
All values from NFL Combine/Pro Day

Means was selected with the 170th overall pick of the 2024 NFL draft by the New Orleans Saints. In Week 6 against the Tampa Bay Buccaneers, Means scored his first career touchdown on a 10–yard reception from Spencer Rattler. On November 2, 2024, Means was placed on injured reserve with a high–ankle sprain. In seven total games (one start) for New Orleans, he recorded nine receptions for 118 yards and one touchdown.

On August 13, 2025, Means was placed on injured reserve, ending his 2025 NFL season.

On August 29, 2026, Means was waived by the Saints as a part of preliminary roster cuts.

=== Cleveland Browns ===
On September 8, 2026, Means was signed to the Cleveland Browns' practice squad. On November 3, he was released with an injury settlement.

=== Kansas City Chiefs ===
On November 5, 2026, Means signed with the Kansas City Chiefs practice squad. On November 17, he was released.

=== Arizona Cardinals ===
On November 18, 2026, Means signed with the Arizona Cardinals practice squad.
