= 2021 Southern Miss Golden Eagles football team =

American college football season

2021 Southern Miss Golden Eagles football
- Conference: Conference USA
- West Division
- Record: 3–9 (2–6 C-USA)
- Head coach: Will Hall (1st season)
- Offensive coordinator: Sam Gregg (1st season)
- Offensive scheme: Multiple
- Defensive coordinator: Austin Armstrong (1st season)
- Base defense: 3–3–5
- Home stadium: M. M. Roberts Stadium

2021 Conference USA football standings
	Conf.			Overall
Team	W		L	W		L
East Division
Western Kentucky xy	7	–	1	9	–	5
Marshall	5	–	3	7	–	6
Old Dominion	5	–	3	6	–	7
Middle Tennessee	4	–	4	7	–	6
Florida Atlantic	3	–	5	5	–	7
Charlotte	3	–	5	5	–	7
FIU	0	–	8	1	–	11
West Division
UTSA xy$	7	–	1	12	–	2
UAB	6	–	2	9	–	4
North Texas	5	–	3	6	–	7
UTEP	4	–	4	7	–	6
Rice	3	–	5	4	–	8
Southern Miss	2	–	6	3	–	9
Louisiana Tech	2	–	6	3	–	9
Championship: UTSA 49, Western Kentucky 41
$ – Conference champion; x – Division champion/co-champions; y – Championship game participant

The 2021 Southern Miss Golden Eagles football team represented the University of Southern Mississippi in the 2021 NCAA Division I FBS football season. The Golden Eagles played their home games at the M. M. Roberts Stadium in Hattiesburg, Mississippi, and competed in the West Division of Conference USA (CUSA). They were led by first-year head coach Will Hall.

On October 28, 2021, Southern Miss announced that this will be the last season for the team in the C-USA and will join the Sun Belt Conference on July 1, 2022.

== Preseason ==
=== C-USA media days ===
The Golden Eagles were predicted to finish in fourth place in the West Division in the Conference USA preseason poll.

Media poll (West Division)
Predicted finish	Team
1	UAB
2	UTSA
3	Louisiana Tech
4	Southern Miss
5	Rice
6	North Texas
7	UTEP

== Schedule ==
Date	Time	Opponent	Site	TV	Result	Attendance
September 4	7:00 p.m.	at South Alabama*	Hancock Whitney Stadium; Mobile, AL	ESPN+	L 7–31	20,156
September 11	6:00 p.m.	Grambling State*	M. M. Roberts Stadium; Hattiesburg, MS	ESPN3	W 37–0	25,235
September 18	6:00 p.m.	Troy*	M. M. Roberts Stadium; Hattiesburg, MS	ESPN+	L 9–21	24,242
September 25	6:30 p.m.	at No. 1 Alabama*	Bryant–Denny Stadium; Tuscaloosa, AL	SECN	L 14–63	100,077
October 2	5:30 p.m.	at Rice	Rice Stadium; Houston, TX	ESPN3	L 19–24	16,031
October 9	6:00 p.m.	UTEP^{†}	M. M. Roberts Stadium; Hattiesburg, MS	ESPN3	L 13–26	26,049
October 16	2:30 p.m.	UAB	M. M. Roberts Stadium; Hattiesburg, MS	Stadium	L 0–34	21,514
October 30	2:30 p.m.	at Middle Tennessee	Johnny "Red" Floyd Stadium; Murfreesboro, TN	ESPN+	L 10–35	10,721
November 6	2:00 p.m.	North Texas	M. M. Roberts Stadium; Hattiesburg, MS	ESPN+	L 14–38	22,478
November 13	2:30 p.m.	at No. 23 UTSA	Alamodome; San Antonio, TX	ESPN+	L 17–27	30,105
November 19	7:00 p.m.	at Louisiana Tech	Joe Aillet Stadium; Ruston, LA (Rivalry in Dixie)	CBSSN	W 35–19	10,410
November 27	2:00 p.m.	FIU	M. M. Roberts Stadium; Hattiesburg, MS	ESPN+	W 37–17	20,041
*Non-conference game; ^{†}Homecoming; Rankings from AP and CFP Rankings after November 2; All times are in Central time

== Personnel ==
2021 Southern Miss Golden Eagles football team roster
Players
Coaches
Offense

Pos.	#	Name	Class
WR	0	Demarcus Jones	Jr
WR	1	Jason Brownlee	Jr
WR	2	Da'Quan Bailey-Brown	Jr
RB	3	Frank Gore Jr.	Fr
QB	5	Ty Keyes	Fr
RB	6	Dajon Richard	Fr
RB	7	Darius Maberry	Jr
QB	8	Trey Lowe	So
QB	9	Tee Webb	Fr
QB	11	Jake Smithhart	Sr
RB	12	Chandler Pittman	Fr
QB	14	Jack Walker	Jr
WR	15	Jakarius Caston	So
WR	16	Brandon Hayes	Fr
WR	17	Zay Franks	Fr
QB	18	Jason Goldstein	So
WR	19	Richard Mays Jr.	Fr
RB	21	Zahn Diaz	Fr
RB	23	Dee Baker	Fr
QB	24	Jake Lange	Fr
RB	28	Jimmie Haywood	Fr
TE	33	Cole Cavallo	So
OL	79	Tykeem Doss	Jr

Defense

Pos.	#	Name	Class
LB	0	Michael Pleas Jr.	Fr
DB	1	Rachuan Mitchell	Sr
DL	2	Eriq Kitchen	Sr
DL	3	Tahj Sykes	Jr
DL	5	Everitt Cunningham	Sr
LB	6	Santrell Latham	Jr
DL	7	Dominic Quewon	Jr
LB	8	Josh Perry	Sr
DB	9	Malik Shorts	So
DB	11	Antavious Willis	Fr
DB	12	Eric Scott Jr.	Jr
DB	13	Tyrek Moody	Jr
DB	15	Vinson Brown	Fr
DB	17	Brendan Toles	Fr
DB	18	Natrone Brooks	Jr
DB	19	Kendrick Abney	Jr
DB	20	Lakevias Daniel	Jr
DB	21	Jay Stanley	So
DB	22	Rube Scott Rhea	Fr
LB	23	Arian Gregory	Fr
LB	24	Tyrese Hopkins	Fr
DB	26	Jay Jones	Fr
LB	28	Swayze Bozeman	Sr
DB	29	Camron Harrell	Jr
DB	31	J.D. Rutherford	Jr
LB	32	Hayes Maples	So
DB	34	Jeremiah McDonald	So
LB	35	TQ Newsome	Fr
DL	36	Dashawn Crawford	Sr
DB	39	Hayes Puckett	Fr

Special teams

Pos.	#	Name	Class
P	16	Mason Hunt	Jr
P	20	Griffin Fleming	So
K	29	Dalton Melancon	So
K	30	Jack Tannehill	Fr
K	40	Briggs Bourgeois	Jr
LS	56	T. J. Harvey	So
LS	59	Justin Hulett	Sr
LS	62	Seth Roberson	Fr
P	92	Payton Snyder	So
K	97	Trey Herbert	Fr
K	98	Andrew Stein	So
K	99	Tucker Barefoot	Fr

Head coach

- Will Hall

Coordinators/assistant coaches

- Reed Stringer
  Assistant head coach/General manager
- Sam Gregg
  Offensive coordinator/Offensive line
- Austin Armstrong
  Defensive coordinator/Inside linebackers
- Cayden Cochran
  Tight ends
- Mark Criner
  Outside linebackers
- Jordy Joseph
  Running backs
- Brandon Lacy
  Defensive line
- Desmond Lindsey
  Wide receivers/Passing game coordinator
- Dan O'Brien
  Safeties
- Greg Meyer
  Special teams coordinator
- Chad Williams
  Cornerbacks

Legend

- (C) Team captain
- (S) Suspended
- (I) Ineligible
- Injured
- Redshirt

Roster

== Game summaries ==
=== At South Alabama ===
	1	2	3	4	Total
Golden Eagles	7	0	0	0	7
Jaguars	0	14	10	7	31

Statistics	USM	USA
First downs	19	13
Total yards	258	300
Rushing yards	125	31
Passing yards	133	269
Turnovers	4	1
Time of possession	31:27	28:33

Team	Category	Player	Statistics
Southern Miss	Passing	Trey Lowe	13/29, 133 yards, 2 INT
Southern Miss	Rushing	Frank Gore Jr.	19 rushes, 81 yards
Southern Miss	Receiving	Jakarius Caston	3 receptions, 38 yards
South Alabama	Passing	Jake Bentley	17/22, 269 yards, 2 TD
South Alabama	Rushing	Kareem Walker	18 rushes, 26 yards
South Alabama	Receiving	Jalen Tolbert	5 receptions, 168 yards

=== Grambling State ===
	1	2	3	4	Total
Tigers	0	0	0	0	0
Golden Eagles	7	3	10	17	37

Statistics	GRAM	USM
First downs	9	22
Total yards	141	439
Rushing yards	51	290
Passing yards	90	149
Turnovers	1	1
Time of possession	28:00	32:10

Team	Category	Player	Statistics
Grambling State	Passing	Aldon Clark	8/19, 60 yards, INT
Grambling State	Rushing	Darqueze Brutton	8 rushes, 35 yards
Grambling State	Receiving	Donald Johnson III	3 receptions, 26 yards
Southern Miss	Passing	Trey Lowe	10/13, 99 yards, TD
Southern Miss	Rushing	Frank Gore Jr.	21 rushes, 162 yards, TD
Southern Miss	Receiving	Jakarius Caston	4 receptions, 50 yards, TD

=== Troy ===
	1	2	3	4	Total
Trojans	0	0	14	7	21
Golden Eagles	3	0	0	6	9

Statistics	TROY	USM
First downs	17	14
Total yards	304	156
Rushing yards	49	-1
Passing yards	255	157
Turnovers	2	2
Time of possession	30:54	29:06

Team	Category	Player	Statistics
Troy	Passing	Taylor Powell	27/39, 255 yards, 2 TD
Troy	Rushing	Kimani Vidal	17 rushes, 45 yards, TD
Troy	Receiving	Tez Johnson	10 receptions, 106 yards
Southern Miss	Passing	Ty Keyes	16/27, 157 yards, 2 INT
Southern Miss	Rushing	Frank Gore Jr.	15 rushes, 31 yards
Southern Miss	Receiving	Antoine Robinson	3 receptions, 49 yards

=== At No. 1 Alabama ===
	1	2	3	4	Total
Golden Eagles	0	7	0	7	14
No. 1 Crimson Tide	21	21	7	14	63

Statistics	USM	ALA
First downs	11	22
Total yards	213	606
Rushing yards	82	211
Passing yards	131	395
Turnovers	1	1
Time of possession	31:18	28:42

Team	Category	Player	Statistics
Southern Miss	Passing	Ty Keyes	11/24, 131 yards, 2 TD, INT
Southern Miss	Rushing	Ty Keyes	12 rushes, 41 yards
Southern Miss	Receiving	Grayson Gunter	3 receptions, 61 yards
Alabama	Passing	Bryce Young	20/22, 313 yards, 5 TD, INT
Alabama	Rushing	Roydell Williams	11 rushes, 110 yards, TD
Alabama	Receiving	Jahleel Billingsley	5 receptions, 105 yards, TD

=== At Rice ===
	1	2	3	4	Total
Golden Eagles	7	0	7	5	19
Owls	7	3	14	0	24

Statistics	USM	RICE
First downs	21	15
Total yards	378	315
Rushing yards	57	108
Passing yards	321	207
Turnovers	4	0
Time of possession	28:22	31:38

Team	Category	Player	Statistics
Southern Miss	Passing	Jake Lange	23/37, 304 yards, TD, 3 INT
Southern Miss	Rushing	Frank Gore Jr.	17 rushes, 79 yards
Southern Miss	Receiving	Jason Brownlee	8 receptions, 127 yards
Rice	Passing	Jake Constantine	16/22, 192 yards, 2 TD
Rice	Rushing	Cedric Patterson III	1 rush, 38 yards, TD
Rice	Receiving	Jake Bailey	5 receptions, 83 yards, TD

=== UTEP ===
	1	2	3	4	Total
Miners	7	7	7	5	26
Golden Eagles	7	0	0	6	13

Statistics	UTEP	USM
First downs	16	17
Total yards	392	254
Rushing yards	265	15
Passing yards	127	239
Turnovers	1	2
Time of possession	30:48	29:12

Team	Category	Player	Statistics
UTEP	Passing	Gavin Hardison	7/17, 127 yards, INT
UTEP	Rushing	Ronald Awatt	18 rushes, 159 yards, TD
UTEP	Receiving	Tyrin Smith	1 reception, 55 yards
Southern Miss	Passing	Jake Lange	20/31, 239 yards, 2 TD, INT
Southern Miss	Rushing	Frank Gore Jr.	16 rushes, 43 yards
Southern Miss	Receiving	Jakarius Caston	4 receptions, 94 yards

=== UAB ===
	1	2	3	4	Total
Blazers	3	28	3	0	34
Golden Eagles	0	0	0	0	0

Statistics	UAB	USM
First downs	20	9
Total yards	388	107
Rushing yards	223	75
Passing yards	165	32
Turnovers	1	1
Time of possession	34:08	25:52

Team	Category	Player	Statistics
UAB	Passing	Dylan Hopkins	8/13, 147 yards, TD
UAB	Rushing	DeWayne McBride	17 rushes, 137 yards, TD
UAB	Receiving	Jermaine Brown Jr.	4 receptions, 48 yards
Southern Miss	Passing	Jake Lange	3/10, 18 yards
Southern Miss	Rushing	Frank Gore Jr.	13 rushes, 40 yards
Southern Miss	Receiving	Jason Brownlee	1 reception, 14 yards

=== At Middle Tennessee ===
	1	2	3	4	Total
Golden Eagles	7	0	3	0	10
Blue Raiders	14	7	14	0	35

Statistics	USM	MTSU
First downs	22	15
Total yards	234	287
Rushing yards	50	145
Passing yards	184	142
Turnovers	5	4
Time of possession	33:00	27:00

Team	Category	Player	Statistics
Southern Miss	Passing	Jake Lange	16/34, 166 yards, TD, 2 INT
Southern Miss	Rushing	Frank Gore Jr.	20 rushes, 83 yards
Southern Miss	Receiving	Jason Brownlee	9 receptions, 120 yards, TD
Middle Tennessee	Passing	Mike DiLiello	8/12, 78 yards
Middle Tennessee	Rushing	Mike DiLiello	11 rushes, 77 yards, 2 TD
Middle Tennessee	Receiving	Jarrin Pierce	3 receptions, 75 yards

=== North Texas ===
	1	2	3	4	Total
Mean Green	0	7	21	10	38
Golden Eagles	14	0	0	0	14

Statistics	UNT	USM
First downs	25	11
Total yards	537	229
Rushing yards	321	113
Passing yards	216	116
Turnovers	1	2
Time of possession	34:14	25:46

Team	Category	Player	Statistics
North Texas	Passing	Austin Aune	16/30, 216 yards, INT
North Texas	Rushing	Isaiah Johnson	17 rushes, 119 yards, TD
North Texas	Receiving	Detraveon Brown	4 receptions, 85 yards
Southern Miss	Passing	Jake Lange	17/25, 116 yards, TD
Southern Miss	Rushing	Frank Gore Jr.	12 rushes, 82 yards
Southern Miss	Receiving	Jason Brownlee	4 receptions, 53 yards, TD

=== At No. 23 UTSA ===
	1	2	3	4	Total
Golden Eagles	0	10	7	0	17
No. 23 Roadrunners	0	10	7	10	27

Statistics	USM	UTSA
First downs	10	16
Total yards	189	370
Rushing yards	137	143
Passing yards	52	227
Turnovers	3	2
Time of possession	37:14	22:46

Team	Category	Player	Statistics
Southern Miss	Passing	Frank Gore Jr.	2/3, 33 yards
Southern Miss	Rushing	Frank Gore Jr.	20 rushes, 123 yards, TD
Southern Miss	Receiving	Jason Brownlee	3 receptions, 51 yards
UTSA	Passing	Frank Harris	17/30, 227 yards, 2 TD, 2 INT
UTSA	Rushing	Sincere McCormick	19 rushes, 90 yards, TD
UTSA	Receiving	Joshua Cephus	8 receptions, 106 yards, TD

=== At Louisiana Tech ===
	1	2	3	4	Total
Golden Eagles	7	14	0	14	35
Bulldogs	3	6	0	10	19

Statistics	USM	LT
First downs	17	14
Total yards	294	250
Rushing yards	184	150
Passing yards	110	100
Turnovers	3	5
Time of possession	35:06	24:54

Team	Category	Player	Statistics
Southern Miss	Passing	Frank Gore Jr.	4/8, 75 yards, 2 TD, INT
Southern Miss	Rushing	Dajon Richard	22 rushes, 120 yards
Southern Miss	Receiving	Jason Brownlee	5 receptions, 67 yards, 2 TD
Louisiana Tech	Passing	Aaron Allen	11/26, 100 yards, 2 INT
Louisiana Tech	Rushing	Marcus Williams Jr.	17 rushes, 76 yards
Louisiana Tech	Receiving	Smoke Harris	4 receptions, 48 yards

=== FIU ===
	1	2	3	4	Total
Panthers	7	7	3	0	17
Golden Eagles	21	0	3	13	37

Statistics	FIU	USM
First downs	14	18
Total yards	391	444
Rushing yards	160	322
Passing yards	231	122
Turnovers	4	3
Time of possession	28:04	31:56

Team	Category	Player	Statistics
FIU	Passing	Max Bortenschlager	13/24, 231 yards, TD, 2 INT
FIU	Rushing	Lexington Joseph	16 rushes, 105 yards, TD
FIU	Receiving	Tyrese Chambers	5 receptions, 155 yards, TD
Southern Miss	Passing	Frank Gore Jr.	4/5, 81 yards, 2 TD
Southern Miss	Rushing	Dajon Richard	16 rushes, 107 yards, TD
Southern Miss	Receiving	Jason Brownlee	5 receptions, 98 yards, 2 TD
