= Protective Stadium =

American football stadium in Birmingham, Alabama

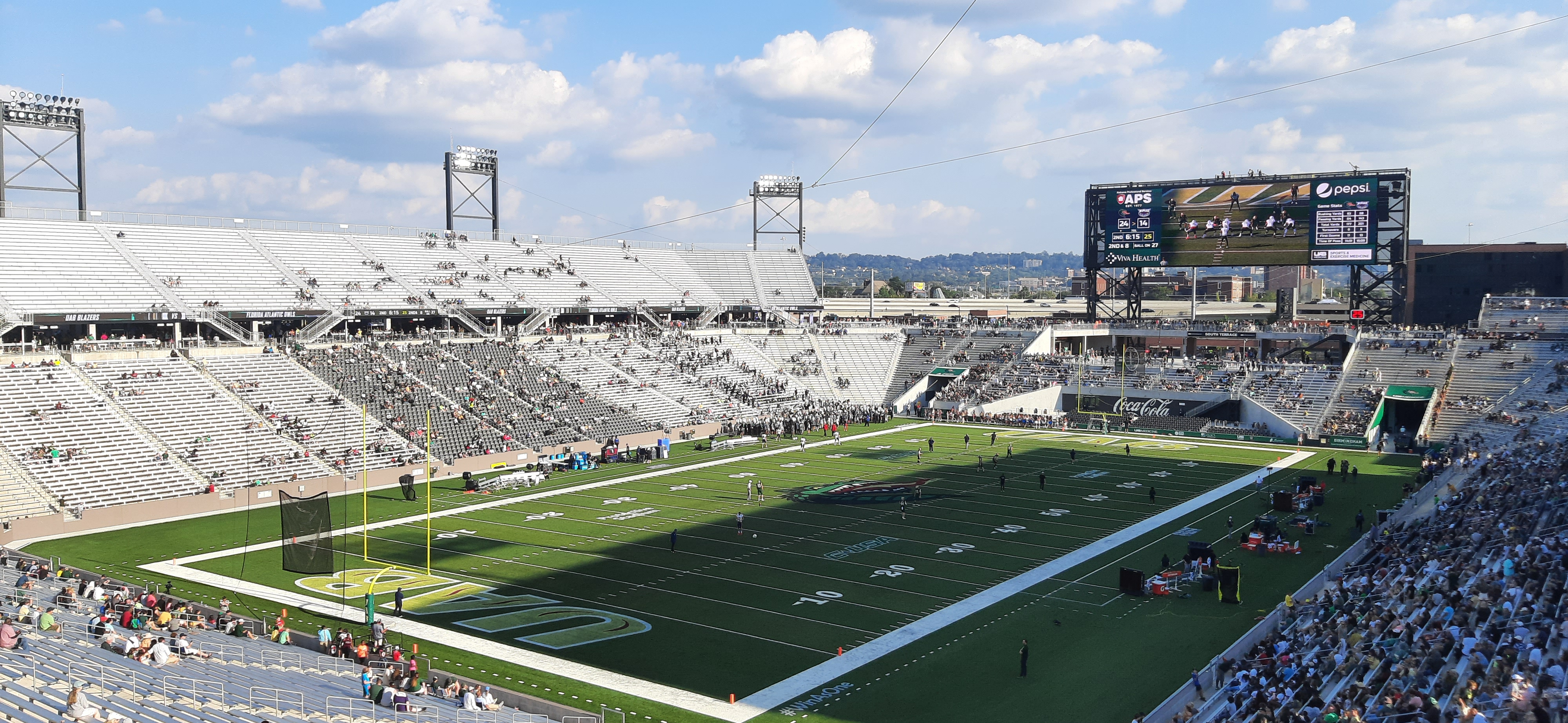
- Protective Stadium in 2021
- Interactive map of Protective Stadium
- Address: 1101 22nd St N Birmingham, Alabama; United States
- Coordinates: 33.5278°N 86.8092°W
- Owner: Birmingham-Jefferson Civic Center Authority
- Operator: Birmingham-Jefferson Civic Center Authority
- Capacity: 47,100

Construction
- Groundbreaking: December 13, 2018
- Opened: October 2, 2021
- Cost: US$175 million
- Architects: Populous; Goodwyn Mills Cawood
- Structural engineer: Walter P. Moore
- General contractors: Brasfield & Gorrie

Tenants
- UAB Blazers (NCAA) 2021–present Birmingham Bowl (NCAA) 2021–present Birmingham Legion FC (USLC) 2022–present Birmingham Stallions (UFL) 2022–2026; New Orleans Breakers (USFL) 2022–2023

Website
- Protective Stadium

Protective Stadium is an outdoor multi-purpose stadium located in downtown Birmingham, Alabama, United States. It is owned and operated by the Birmingham-Jefferson Civic Center Authority (BJCC). The stadium officially opened in 2021 and is named for Protective Life, a financial services holding company based in Birmingham, under a 15-year naming rights agreement worth $1 million annually.

The stadium serves as the home venue for the UAB Blazers football team and Birmingham Legion FC of the USL Championship. It also hosts the annual Birmingham Bowl, a post-season college football bowl game. The stadium previously served as the home venue for the Birmingham Stallions of the United Football League (UFL) from 2022 to 2026.

The stadium was constructed as part of a larger redevelopment plan for downtown Birmingham and has quickly become a central hub for sports and entertainment events in the region.

== History ==
=== Football ===
Protective Stadium became the home of the UAB Blazers football program beginning with the 2021 season, replacing the historic Legion Field, which had served as the team's home since 1991. The transition to a new, modern venue was considered a milestone for the program, offering enhanced facilities, a better location, and improved fan experiences.

The Blazers played their first game at Protective Stadium on October 2, 2021, against the Liberty Flames. The matchup marked the official debut of the stadium and drew widespread local and regional attention, with over 35,000 fans in attendance. The event was viewed as a major milestone in the continued growth and revitalization of UAB’s football program, which had previously been shut down in 2014 before being reinstated in 2017. The move to a new, purpose-built downtown facility was seen as a symbol of the program's resurgence and long-term stability. For Birmingham, the opening of the stadium represented a key achievement in downtown redevelopment efforts and a renewed commitment to hosting high-profile sporting events.

The stadium has a seating capacity of approximately 47,100, and includes modern features such as premium seating, suites, updated locker rooms, and a high definition video board. It has five locker rooms including a permanent UAB football locker room, a head coach's office for exclusive UAB use, a staff locker room, and dedicated meeting space for recruiting activities as of 2024.

In December 2021, the stadium hosted the Super 7, the football championship games of the Alabama High School Athletic Association (AHSAA), as part of a three-year rotation with Bryant–Denny Stadium in Tuscaloosa and Jordan–Hare Stadium in Auburn that will run through at least 2032. (Note: While the current AHSAA rotation runs through 2032, the last event in Birmingham during this cycle will be in 2030.)

The stadium has hosted the annual Birmingham Bowl since the bowl's 2021 edition—played on December 28, 2021, it was the first event at the venue to sell out.

The United States Football League (USFL) played most of its 2022 games in Birmingham at Protective Stadium with the rest played at Legion Field. In 2023, Protective Stadium became one of the league's four hub sites, hosting home games for the Birmingham Stallions and also "home" games for the New Orleans Breakers. The Stallions continued to play at Protective from 2024 to 2026 following the USFL's merger into the United Football League. In July 2026, the UFL announced that the league would leave Birmingham and Protective Stadium. One of the league's co-owners, Mike Repole, singled out the stadium's capacity as being too large for the smaller spring league.

=== Soccer ===
Birmingham Legion FC, a USLC soccer team, has played at Protective Stadium since the 2022 season. Birmingham Legion FC set a club-best attendance mark of 18,418 fans in a Lamar Hunt U.S. Open Cup quarterfinal match played against Major League Soccer (MLS) club Inter Miami CF on June 7, 2023.

=== Other events ===
On June 4, 2022, the stadium hosted its inaugural concert, featuring country music legend Garth Brooks. This event was Brooks' first performance in Birmingham in seven years. The concert attracted over 50,000 attendees, setting a new attendance record for the venue. It was also the only stop of Brooks 2022 Stadium Tour in Alabama, Georgia, and Mississippi.

In March 2024, the stadium hosted Round 9 of the Monster Energy AMA Supercross Championship Series marking its debut as a Supercross venue and becoming only the second Alabama stop in the series’ roughly 50 year history. Jett Lawrence took the 450SX main event win during the stadium’s inaugural Supercross race.

On March 23, 2024, the stadium hosted a round of the 2024 Monster Jam Stadium Championship Series West, marking the first Monster Jam stadium show ever held in Alabama.

On October 11, 2025, R&B artist Chris Brown brought Breezy Bowl XX tour to the stadium. This marked one of the largest R&B events held at the venue since its opening in 2021.

The R&B Tour featuring Usher and Chris Brown, held concerts at the stadium on July 28 and 29, 2026, for the stadium's first two–night concert.

== Attendance records ==
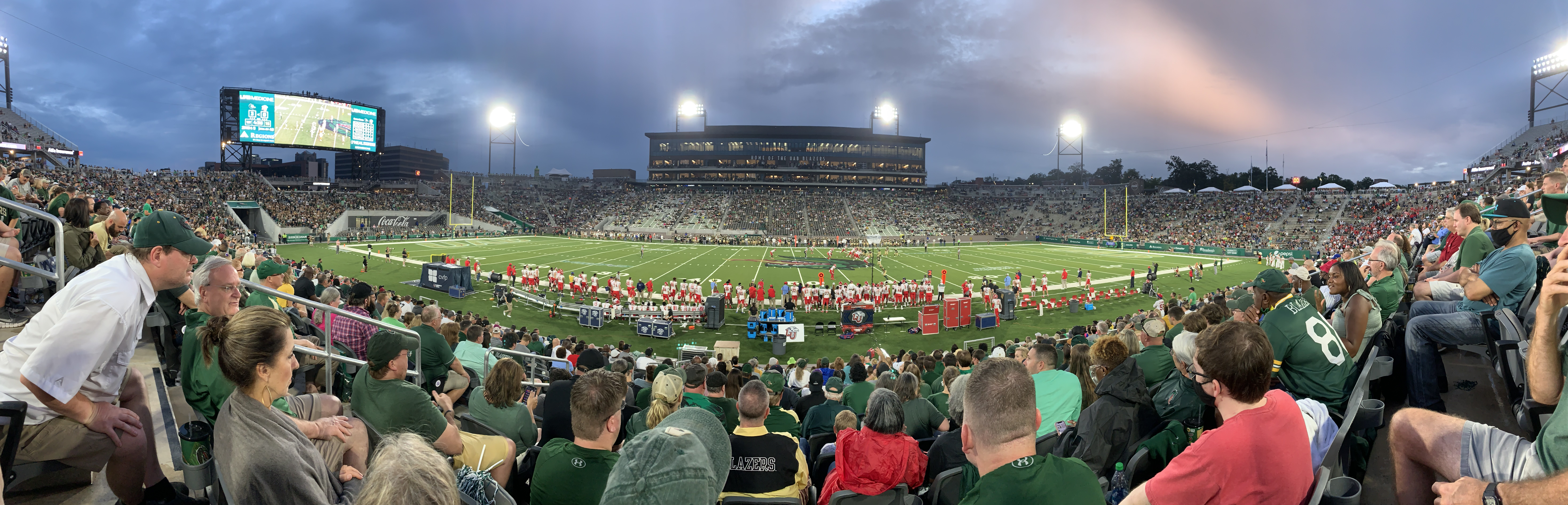
Protective Stadium's debut: UAB vs. Liberty on October 2, 2021

Rank	Attendance	Date	Notes
1	approx. 50,000	June 4, 2022	Garth Brooks concert
2	47,100 (Note: Played as the 2021 Birmingham Bowl.)	December 28, 2021	Houston 17 – Auburn 13
3	37,167	October 2, 2021	UAB 12 – Liberty 36
4	32,542	September 1, 2022	UAB 59 – Alabama A&M 0
5	approx. 27,000	July 7, 2022	World Games Opening Ceremony
6	25,363	August 31, 2023	UAB 35 – North Carolina A&T 6
7	25,191	October 9, 2021	UAB 31 – Florida Atlantic 14
8	24,845	October 23, 2021	UAB 24 – Rice 30
9	24,302	September 17, 2022	UAB 35 – Georgia Southern 21
10	23,694	October 8, 2022	UAB 41 – Middle Tennessee 14

=== Year by year ===
Season	Head Coach	Conference	Avg. Crowd	Home Record
2021	Bill Clark	Conference USA	25,629	3–2
2022	Bryant Vincent	Conference USA	23,058	5–1
2023	Trent Dilfer	American Athletic Conference	21,543	4–2
2024	Trent Dilfer	American Athletic Conference	19,501	3–3
2025	Trent Dilfer	American Athletic Conference	19,702	3–3
2026	Alex Mortensen	American Athletic Conference	21,940	4–0
