= DeAndre Torrey =

American football player (born 1998)

Profile
- Position: Running back

Personal information
- Born: December 23, 1998 (age 27); Gautier, Mississippi, U.S.
- Listed height: 5 ft 7 in (1.70 m)
- Listed weight: 199 lb (90 kg)

Career information
- High school: Gautier (MS)
- College: Mississippi Gulf Coast CC (2017); North Texas (2018–2021)
- NFL draft: 2022: undrafted

Career history
- Michigan Panthers (2022); Philadelphia Eagles (2022)*; Vegas Vipers (2023); Toronto Argonauts (2024)*; Memphis Showboats (2025)*
- * Offseason or practice squad member only

DeAndre Torrey (born December 23, 1998) is an American professional football running back. He played college football at North Texas and has also been a member of the Michigan Panthers of the United States Football League (USFL), the Philadelphia Eagles of the National Football League (NFL), the Vegas Vipers of the XFL, and the Toronto Argonauts of the Canadian Football League (CFL).

== Early life ==
Torrey, a native of Gautier, Mississippi, attended Gautier High School, where he earned all-state honors and gained 1,926 all-purpose yards as a senior. He was named a three-start prospect by 247Sports. Due to his small size (5 feet, 7 inches tall, 182 pounds), Torrey received little attention from colleges after graduating from Gautier, and so he joined Mississippi Gulf Coast Community College. In nine games as a freshman, he rushed for 1,298 yards and scored 12 touchdowns on 185 attempts, averaging 144.2 yards per game, second highest nationally. Following this, he began receiving offers from four-year colleges, including North Texas, Troy, South Alabama, and Central Arkansas.

Torrey accepted North Texas' offer and announced his commitment in December 2017. In his first season with the school, 2018, he ran 175 times and gained 977 yards, for a team-leading 15 touchdowns as well as 25 receptions for 205 yards. In his debut, against SMU, he returned a kickoff 96-yards for a touchdown. He was named a second-team All-Conference USA running back and honorable mention all-conference return specialist.

Torrey began the 2019 season on the Doak Walker Award watchlist as well as the Hornung Award watchlist. In the season, he gained a total of 967 yards, which led the team. Offensively, he recorded 380 rushing yards off of 73 carries and 16 catches for 86 yards, scoring three touchdowns.

Torrey was named an honorable mention all-conference selection following the 2020 season, where he ran 113 times for 656 and six touchdowns in nine games. He also recorded four receptions for 20 yards. He was added to the Paul Hornung Award honor roll after a game against Rice on November 21. In his senior year, Torrey ran for 1,215 yards on 248 attempts and scored 13 touchdowns, earning second-team all-conference honors. Following an upset over UTSA, he was given the Earl Campbell Award for being the national player of the week.

== Professional career ==
After going unselected in the 2022 NFL draft, Torrey attended mini-camp with the New York Jets, but was not signed.

=== Michigan Panthers ===
Shortly before the final regular season game of the 2022 USFL season, Torrey was signed by the Michigan Panthers. He appeared in one game, making two rushes for three yards.

=== Philadelphia Eagles ===
On August 10, 2022, Torrey was signed by the Philadelphia Eagles after a successful tryout. He was released on August 23.

=== Vegas Vipers ===
Torrey was selected in the ninth round of the 2023 XFL draft (69th overall) by the Vegas Vipers. He was placed on the team's reserve list on March 28, 2023. The Vipers folded when the XFL and USFL merged to create the United Football League (UFL).

=== Toronto Argonauts ===
On January 15, 2024, Torrey signed with the Toronto Argonauts. However, he was suspended in May, before the start of training camp, and was eventually released from his contract on November 25, 2024.

=== Memphis Showboats ===
On December 20, 2024, Torrey signed with the Memphis Showboats of the United Football League (UFL). He was released on March 8, 2025.
