= 2021 Charlotte 49ers football team =

American college football season

2021 Charlotte 49ers football
- Conference: Conference USA
- East Division
- Record: 5–7 (3–5 C-USA)
- Head coach: Will Healy (3rd season)
- Offensive coordinator: Mark Carney (2nd season)
- Offensive scheme: Spread option
- Co-defensive coordinators: Brandon Cooper (3rd season); Marcus West (3rd season)
- Base defense: 4–3
- Home stadium: Jerry Richardson Stadium

2021 Conference USA football standings
	Conf.			Overall
Team	W		L	W		L
East Division
Western Kentucky xy	7	–	1	9	–	5
Marshall	5	–	3	7	–	6
Old Dominion	5	–	3	6	–	7
Middle Tennessee	4	–	4	7	–	6
Florida Atlantic	3	–	5	5	–	7
Charlotte	3	–	5	5	–	7
FIU	0	–	8	1	–	11
West Division
UTSA xy$	7	–	1	12	–	2
UAB	6	–	2	9	–	4
North Texas	5	–	3	6	–	7
UTEP	4	–	4	7	–	6
Rice	3	–	5	4	–	8
Southern Miss	2	–	6	3	–	9
Louisiana Tech	2	–	6	3	–	9
Championship: UTSA 49, Western Kentucky 41
$ – Conference champion; x – Division champion/co-champions; y – Championship game participant

The 2021 Charlotte 49ers football team represented the University of North Carolina at Charlotte in the 2021 NCAA Division I FBS football season. The 49ers played their home games at Jerry Richardson Stadium in Charlotte, North Carolina, and competed in the East Division of Conference USA (C–USA). They were led by third-year head coach Will Healy.

== Coaching staff ==
On December 29, 2020 offensive line coach Lee Grimes left to take the same position at Kansas. On February 2, Texas co-offensive coordinator and offensive line coach Herb Hand was named to the same position at Charlotte. By February 18, he accepted a position on Gus Malzahn's new staff at UCF. On February 3, wide receivers coach Montario Hardesty joined the South Carolina staff as running backs coach. On February 9, tight ends coach Cody Woodiel returned to the Oregon Ducks as recruiting director. On February 15, South Carolina receivers coach and Charlotte native Joe Cox was named the 49ers' tight ends coach. On February 18 Ridge View High School head coach Perry Parks was brought on to coach wide receivers. On March 3, former NCAA Division II coach of the Year Pete Rossomando came on board to coach offensive line. On June 30, Tyler Hancock joined the staff as special teams coordinator after working as a senior analyst for West Virginia.

Name	Position	Seasons at Charlotte	Alma mater
Will Healy	Head coach	3	Richmond (2008)
Marcus West	Assistant Head coach/co-Defensive coordinator/Defensive line	3	Memphis (2005)
Mark Carney	Offensive coordinator/quarterbacks coach	3	Fordham (2004)
Brandon Cooper	Co-Defensive coordinator/Safeties	3	UT Martin (2007)
Adam Braithwaite	Linebackers coach	2	William and Mary (2002)
Joe Cox	Tight ends coach	1	Georgia (2009)
Sean Dawkins	Runningbacks coach/Run game coordinator	3	Troy (2007)
Tyler Hancock	Special teams coordinator	1	Kentucky Wesleyan (2012)
Eddie Hicks	Cornerbacks coach	3	So Miss (2010)
Pete Rossomando	Offensive line coach	1	Boston U. (1995)
Perry Parks	Wide receivers coach	1	Coastal (2007)

== Recruiting ==
=== Position key ===
Halfback	HB	Center	C	Cornerback	CB	Defensive back	DB
Defensive end	DE	Defensive lineman	DL	Defensive tackle	DT	End	E
Fullback	FB	Guard	G	Halfback	HB	Kicker	K
Kickoff returner	KR	Offensive tackle	OT	Offensive lineman	OL	Linebacker	LB
Long snapper	LS	Punter	P	Punt returner	PR	Quarterback	QB
Running back	RB	Safety	S	Tight end	TE	Wide receiver	WR

=== Recruiting class ===
The following recruits and transfers have signed letters of intent or verbally committed to the Charlotte 49ers football program for the 2021 recruiting year.

College recruiting (2021)
Name	Hometown	School	Height	Weight	40^{‡}	Commit date
Knox Boyd; OL	Denton, TX	Guyer HS	6 ft 4 in (1.93 m)	290 lb (130 kg)	–	Oct 19, 2020
Knox Boyd; OL	Recruit ratings: Scout: Rivals: 247Sports: ESPN:					
D. J. Brown; LB	Memphis, TN	Memphis Univ. School	6 ft 0 in (1.83 m)	235 lb (107 kg)	–	Dec 12, 2020
D. J. Brown; LB	Recruit ratings: Scout: Rivals: 247Sports: ESPN:					
Cam Burden; LB	Sevierville, TN	Alcoa HS	6 ft 3 in (1.91 m)	215 lb (98 kg)	–	Dec 16, 2020
Cam Burden; LB	Recruit ratings: Scout: Rivals: 247Sports: ESPN:					
Tyson Clawson; DE	Charlotte, NC	Independence HS	6 ft 1 in (1.85 m)	230 lb (100 kg)	–	May 16, 2020
Tyson Clawson; DE	Recruit ratings: Scout: Rivals: 247Sports: ESPN:					
Miguel Jackson; DE	Gibsonia, PA	Pine-Richland HS	6 ft 2 in (1.88 m)	270 lb (120 kg)	–	Jan 23, 2021
Miguel Jackson; DE	Recruit ratings: Scout: Rivals: 247Sports: ESPN:					
Jarius Mack; WR	Athens, GA	Clarke Central HS	5 ft 10 in (1.78 m)	170 lb (77 kg)	–	Jun 24, 2020
Jarius Mack; WR	Recruit ratings: Scout: Rivals: 247Sports: ESPN:					
Douglas Newsome; CB	Orange, VA	Orange County HS	6 ft 0 in (1.83 m)	175 lb (79 kg)	–	Dec 16, 2020
Douglas Newsome; CB	Recruit ratings: Scout: Rivals: 247Sports: ESPN:					
Steven Parker; S	Tampa, FL	Tampa Bay Tech	6 ft 2 in (1.88 m)	170 lb (77 kg)	–	Dec 11, 2020
Steven Parker; S	Recruit ratings: Scout: Rivals: 247Sports: ESPN:					
Miles Posey; DE	Yorktown, VA	Life Christian Academy	6 ft 3 in (1.91 m)	240 lb (110 kg)	–	Jul 27, 2020
Miles Posey; DE	Recruit ratings: Scout: Rivals: 247Sports: ESPN:					
Isaiah Potts; DT	Fayetteville, NC	Pine Forest HS	6 ft 2 in (1.88 m)	300 lb (140 kg)	–	Aug 27, 2020
Isaiah Potts; DT	Recruit ratings: Scout: Rivals: 247Sports: ESPN:					
B. J. Ragland; OL/DL	Chattanooga, TN	Red Bank HS	6 ft 3 in (1.91 m)	305 lb (138 kg)	–	Nov 18, 2020
B. J. Ragland; OL/DL	Recruit ratings: Scout: Rivals: 247Sports: ESPN:					
Bailey Rice; P	Melbourne, Australia	Hallam Senior College	6 ft 1 in (1.85 m)	205 lb (93 kg)	–	Dec 16, 2020
Bailey Rice; P	Recruit ratings: ESPN:					
Chavion Smith; RB	Statesville, NC	Statesville HS	5 ft 9 in (1.75 m)	205 lb (93 kg)	–	Jul 30, 2020
Chavion Smith; RB	Recruit ratings: Scout: Rivals: 247Sports: ESPN:					
Elijah Spencer; WR	Irmo, SC	Dutch Fork HS	6 ft 2 in (1.88 m)	190 lb (86 kg)	–	Jul 13, 2020
Elijah Spencer; WR	Recruit ratings: Scout: Rivals: 247Sports: ESPN:					
Trevor Timmons; OL	Brunswick, GA	Blythewood HS	6 ft 2 in (1.88 m)	275 lb (125 kg)	–	Oct 26, 2020
Trevor Timmons; OL	Recruit ratings: Scout: Rivals: 247Sports: ESPN:					
Colin Weber; TE	Hopkins, MI	Hopkins HS	6 ft 4 in (1.93 m)	220 lb (100 kg)	–	Dec 11, 2020
Colin Weber; TE	Recruit ratings: Scout: Rivals: 247Sports: ESPN:					
Xavier Williams; QB	Moultrie, GA	Colquitt County HS	6 ft 2 in (1.88 m)	205 lb (93 kg)	–	Dec 16, 2020
Xavier Williams; QB	Recruit ratings: Scout: Rivals: 247Sports: ESPN:					
Overall recruit ranking: Scout: 107 Rivals: N/A 247Sports: 107 ESPN: N/A
‡ Refers to 40-yard dash; Note: In many cases, Scout, Rivals, 247Sports, On3, and ESPN may conflict in their listings of height, weight and 40 time.; In these cases, the average was taken. ESPN grades are on a 100-point scale.; Sources: "Charlotte Football Commitments". Rivals.; "2021 Charlotte Football Commits". Scout.; "ESPN". ESPN.; "Scout.com Team Recruiting Rankings". Scout.; "2021 Team Ranking". Rivals.com.

=== Key transfers ===
Player	Position	Previous	Home town	High school	Class	Height	Weight
Jon Alexander	Safety	Kansas	Fort Worth, TX	Trimble Tech	Grad	6'-3"	210 lbs
Joshua Bailey	Defensive tackle	Iowa St.	Jacksonville, FL	William Raines HS	R-SR	6'-2"	300 lbs
Shadrick Byrd	Runningback	Iowa	Alabaster, AL	Thompson HS	R-SO	5'-10"	210 lbs
James Foster	Quarterback	Texas A&M	Montgomery, AL	Sidney Lanier HS	R-SO	6'-2"	210 lbs
Davondre Robinson	Safety	ECU	Holly Hill, SC	Lake Marion HS	Grad	6'-0"	200 lbs
Kofi Wardlow	Defensive end	Notre Dame	Washington, D.C.	St. John's HS	Grad	6'-3"	250 lbs
Justin Whisenhunt	Linebacker	Troy	Birmingham, AL	Ramsay HS	Grad	6'-1"	225 lbs

== Players ==
=== Roster ===
2021 Charlotte 49ers football team roster
Players
Coaches
Offense

Pos.	#	Name	Class
QB	0	Trexler Ivey	RFr
WR	1	Victor Tucker (C)	RSr
QB	2	Dom Shoffner	RSr
QB	3	Chris Reynolds (C)	RSr
WR	4	Cameron Dollar	RSr
WR	6	Tre’ Goode	Jr
QB	7	James Foster	RSo
QB	8	Xavier Williams	Fr
WR	9	Elijah Spencer	Fr
QB	10	Daniel Ratliff	RJr
TE	11	Taylor Thompson	RFr
TE	12	Donta Armstrong	RFr
RB	13	Shadrick Byrd	Jr
WR	14	Grant DuBose	So
WR	15	Justin Jeffrey	RJr
WR	16	Kendric Blake Jr.	RSo
WR	17	Ford Werness	RJr
TE	18	Colin Weber	Fr
WR	19	Keith Pearson Jr.	RSr
WR	20	Dominic Green	Fr
RB	21	Elijah Turner	RFr
WR	22	Chris Houston	RFr
WR	23	Andre Francois	RFr
RB	24	Chavion Smith	Fr
RB	25	Chavon McEachern	RFr
RB	26	Terrick Smalls Jr.	RJr
RB	27	McKinley Nelson	Jr
WR	28	Nolan Groulx	RSo
TE	29	Ricky Kofoed	RSo
RB	30	Keegan Williams	RFr
RB	32	Henry Rutledge	Fr
RB	33	Hahsaun Wilson	Fr
WR	34	Freddie Felton III	Fr
WR	37	Jack Reynolds	Fr
WR	39	Teddy Creecy III	RSo
WR	40	Bryce Parker	Fr
OL	51	B.J. Ragland	Fr
OL	52	Jonny King	RFr
OL	53	Panda Askew	RFr
OL	54	Gage Welborn	RJr
OL	57	Ashton Gist	Sr
OL	58	Jon Jacobs	RSr
OL	61	Marshall Futrell	Fr
OL	63	Trevor Timmons	Fr
OL	64	Victor Lofton	Fr
OL	66	Navardo Miller	RSo
OL	68	D.J. Therrell	Fr
OL	69	Dejan Rasuo	RJr
OL	70	D'Mitri Emmanuel	RSr
OL	71	Arabee Muslim	RFr
OL	72	Cameron Clark	RFr
OL	74	Knox Boyd	Fr
OL	75	T.J. Moore	RSr
OL	76	Jordan Brown	Fr
OL	77	Jaxon Hughes	RSo
OL	78	Hunter Kelly	RSr
OL	79	Chibueze Nwanna	RSr
WR	80	Jairus Mack	Fr
TE	81	Jake Clemons	RFr
TE	82	Jaylan Williams	RSo
WR	83	Chris Wiggins	RJr
WR	84	Khilen Holliman	Fr
TE	85	Ryan Carriere	RSr
TE	86	Bryce Kennon	RFr
WR	87	Chylon Thomas	RJr
TE	88	Riley Engelhard	Fr
WR	89	Quinton Patten	RSo
TE	93	Emmanuel White	RSr
QB		Preston Brown	RSo
QB		Ryan Tyson	Fr

Defense

Pos.	#	Name	Class
DE	0	Markees Watts	Sr
DB	1	Jon Alexander	RSr
LB	2	Justin Whisenhunt	RSr
DB	3	Trey Creamer	RSr
CB	4	Geo Howard	Sr
LB	5	Tyler Murray (C)	RSr
DB	6	Soloman Rogers	Jr
DE	7	Kofi Wardlow	RSr
LB	8	Cam Burden	Fr
DE	9	Joshua Bailey	RSr
DB	10	Davondre Robinson (injured)	RSr
DB	12	Shedrick Ursery	RFr
DB	13	Briston Bennett	RFr
S	14	Steven Parker	Fr
DB	15	Jarvis Martin	So
DB	16	Valerian Agbaw	RFr
LB	17	Luke Martin (C)	RSr
DB	18	Lance McMillan	RJr
LB	19	Comanche Frncisco	RFr
CB	20	Doug Newsome	Fr
LB	21	Shyhiem Scotland	Fr
DB	22	Marcus Robitaille	RSo
DB	23	Matt Martinez	RJr
DB	24	Lacy Williams	RSo
LB	25	Prince Bemah	RSo
DB	26	Shamar Baker	So
DB	27	Bryson Whitehead	RJr
DB	28	J.J. Jones	Jr
DB	29	Jonnie Pitman	RJr
LB	30	Derek Boykins	RSo
DB	31	Trey Bly	RSo
DB	32	John Anderson	Fr
LB	33	Jaylon Sharpe	Jr
DB	34	Boyd Farmer	Fr
DB	35	Antone Williams	RSr
LB	36	D.J. Brown	Fr
DB	38	Anthony Jackson	RFr
DL	40	Rayshaad Roddy	RJr
LB	43	Isaiah Turnage	Fr
DL	44	Mikel Horton	RSr
DL	48	Barutti Mazangu	RFr
DL	50	Darion Smith	RFr
LB	51	Peter Agabe	RSr
DL	53	Michael Kelly	RSo
DT	55	Isaiah Potts	Fr
DL	56	Jordan Moore	RFr
DL	57	Siah Sa'o	RSr
LB	59	B.J. Turner	RJr
DL	60	Bryan Wallace	RJr
DL	90	Dez Morgan	RFr
DE	91	Corey Mobley	RSr
DE	92	Miles Posey	Fr
DE	94	Isaiah Belk	RJr
DE	95	Miguel Jackson	Fr
DL	96	Isaac Hampton	RSr
DL	97	Jalar Holley	RFr
DE	98	Tyson Clawson	Fr
DE	99	Taylor Chandler	RJr

Special teams

Pos.	#	Name	Class
K	11	Jonathan Cruz	Sr
P	37	Bailey Rice	Fr
LS	39	Colby Garfield	RFr
LS	41	Doug McLaughlin	Jr
P	42	Alex Schattin	Fr
K	43	Max Bilstein	RSo
P/K	44	Zach Nicholson	RJr
LS	45	Cameron Lyons	RSr
K	46	Aidan Laros	Fr
P/K	47	Ethan Torres	RSr

Head coach

- Will Healy (Richmond)

Coordinators/assistant coaches

- Marcus West (Memphis)
  Assistant head coach/co-Defensive coordinator/defensive line
- Mark Carney (Fordham)
  Offensive coordinator/quarterbacks
- Brandon Cooper (UT Martin)
  Co-defensive coordinator/safeties
- Adam Braithwaite (William & Mary)
  Linebackers
- Joe Cox (Georgia)
  Tight ends
- Sean Dawkins (Troy)
  Run Game Coordinator/running backs
- Tyler Hancock (Kentucky Wesleyan)
  Special teams coordinator
- Eddie Hicks (Southern Miss)
  Cornerbacks
- Pete Rossomando (Boston University)
  Offensive line
- Perry Parks (Coastal Carolina)
  Wide receivers

Legend

- (C) Team captain
- (S) Suspended
- (I) Ineligible
- Injured
- Redshirt

Roster

=== Depth chart ===
Defense
4–3

FS
JON ALEXANDER
Steven Parker
⋅

WLB	MLB	SLB
TYLER MURRAY	LUKE MARTIN	JUSTIN WHISENHUNT
Solomon Rogers	B.J. Turner	Prince Bemah
⋅	⋅	⋅

SS
SOLOMON ROGERS
Matt Martinez
Marcus Robitaille

CB
TREY CREAMER
Shedrick Ursery
⋅

DE	DT	DT	DE
MARKEES WATTS	BRYAN WALLACE	ISAAC HAMPTON	KOFI WARDLOW
Tyson Clawson	Siah Sa'o	Dez Morgan	Michael Kelly
Taylor Chandler	Joshua Bailey	⋅	⋅

CB
GEO HOWARD
Lance McMillan
Valerian Agbaw

Offense
Pro-style

WR
VICTOR TUCKER
Keith Pearson Jr.
⋅

WR
GRANT DUBOSE
Ejijah Spencer
⋅

LT	LG	C	RG	RT
JAXON HUGHES	D’MITRI EMMANUEL	HUNTER KELLY	ASHTON GIST	T.J. MOORE
Chibueze Nwanna	Panda Askew	Jonny King	Dejan Rasuo	Arabee Muslim
⋅	⋅	⋅	⋅	⋅

TE
RYAN CARRIERE
Taylor Thompson
⋅

WR
CAMERON DOLLAR
Tre' Goode
⋅

QB
CHRIS REYNOLDS
James Foster
⋅

Special teams
PK Jonathan Cruz
PK Max Blitstein
P Bailey Rice
P Ethan Torres
KR Calvin Camp
PR Geo Howard
LS Cameron Lyons
H Chris Reynolds

RB
CALVIN CAMP
Shadrick Byrd
⋅

== Awards and honors ==
=== Preseason ===
Awards Watch List	Player	Position	Year
Maxwell Award	Chris Reynolds	QB	RSR
Wuerffel Trophy	Peter Agabe	LB	RSR
Johnny Unitas Golden Arm Award	Chris Reynolds	QB	RSR
Senior Bowl	Tyler Murray	LB	RSR

=== In season ===
Awards Watch List	Player	Position	Year
Manning Award	Chris Reynolds	QB	RSR
Burlsworth Trophy Semifinalist	Chris Reynolds	QB	RSR

Award	Player	Position	Year	Game
Conference USA Offensive Player of the Week	Chris Reynolds	QB	RSR	Duke
Conference USA Offensive Player of the Week	Chris Reynolds	QB	RSR	Middle Tennessee
Conference USA Special Teams Player of the Week	Shadrick Byrd	RB	RSO	FIU

=== Postseason ===
Conference Award	Player	Position	Year
C-USA Freshman of the Year	Elijah Spencer	WR	FR
C-USA All-Academic Team	Chris Reynolds	QB	RSR
C-USA All-Freshman Team	Shadrick Byrd	RB	RFR
C-USA All-Freshman Team	Shadrick Byrd	KR	RFR
C-USA All-Freshman Team	Elijah Spencer	WR	FR
C-USA All-Freshman Team	Bailey Rice	P	FR

All Conference Honorable Mentions:

Offense: QB – Chris Reynolds, R-Sr. • TE – Ryan Carriere, Gr. • WR – Grant DuBose, So. • OL – Ashton Gist, Sr. • OL – Hunter Kelly, Gr.

Defense: DE – Markees Watts, R-Sr. • LB – Tyler Murray, R-Sr.

Special Teams: KR – Shadrick Byrd, R-Fr. • LS – Cameron Lyons, Gr.

== Schedule ==
Date	Time	Opponent	Site	TV	Result	Attendance
September 3	7:00 p.m.	Duke*	Jerry Richardson Stadium; Charlotte, NC	CBSSN	W 31–28	14,125
September 11	6:00 p.m.	Gardner–Webb*	Jerry Richardson Stadium; Charlotte, NC	ESPN3	W 38–10	12,274
September 18	7:00 p.m.	at Georgia State*	Center Parc Stadium; Atlanta, GA	ESPN+	L 9–20	12,978
September 24	6:30 p.m.	Middle Tennessee	Jerry Richardson Stadium; Charlotte, NC	CBSSN	W 42–39	11,076
October 2	12:00 p.m.	at Illinois*	Memorial Stadium; Champaign, IL	BTN	L 14–24	30,559
October 8	7:00 p.m.	at FIU	Riccardo Silva Stadium; Miami, FL	CBSSN	W 45–33	0
October 21	7:30 p.m.	Florida Atlantic	Jerry Richardson Stadium; Charlotte, NC	CBSSN	L 9–38	13,017
October 30	4:00 p.m.	at Western Kentucky	Houchens Industries–L. T. Smith Stadium; Bowling Green, KY	ESPN+	L 13–45	16,763
November 6	3:30 p.m.	Rice^{†}	Jerry Richardson Stadium; Charlotte, NC	ESPN+	W 31–24 ^{OT}	16,050
November 13	3:30 p.m.	at Louisiana Tech	Joe Aillet Stadium; Ruston, LA	Stadium	L 32–42	14,068
November 20	3:30 p.m.	Marshall	Jerry Richardson Stadium; Charlotte, NC	Stadium	L 28–49	13,211
November 27	2:00 p.m.	at Old Dominion	S.B. Ballard Stadium; Norfolk, VA (Oyster Bowl)	ESPN+	L 34–56	15,874
*Non-conference game; ^{†}Homecoming; Rankings from AP Poll and CFP Rankings; All times are in Eastern time

== Television ==
Charlotte 49ers home games and conference road games will be broadcast through Conference USA's television partners ESPN, CBS Sports, and Stadium.

== Radio ==
Radio coverage for all games is broadcast by IMG College through the Charlotte 49ers Radio Network flagship station WZGV ESPN Radio 730 AM The Game, and the TuneIn Charlotte 49ers IMG Sports Network app. The radio announcers are "Voice of the 49ers" Matt Swierad with play-by-play alongside NFL veteran Al Wallace providing color commentary and Bobby Rosinski and Walker Mehl with sideline reports.

== Preseason media poll ==
Conference USA released their preseason media poll on July 19, 2021, with the 49ers predicted to finish in fourth place in the East Division.

East Division
Predicted finish	Team
1	Marshall
2	Florida Atlantic
3	Western Kentucky
4	Charlotte
5	Middle Tennessee
6	FIU
7	Old Dominion

== Game summaries ==
=== Duke ===
Duke vs Charlotte

Team	1	2	3	4	Total
Blue Devils	0	14	0	14	28
• 49ers	7	3	7	14	31

- Date: September 3, 2021
- Location: Jerry Richardson Stadium
  Charlotte, NC
- Game start: 7:03 p.m. EDT
- Elapsed time: 4:05
- Game attendance: 14,125
- Game weather: Temperature: 80 °F (27 °C) • Weather: Sunny • Wind: NE 0 MPH
- Referee: Riley Johnson
- TV announcers (CBSSN): Chris Lewis, Corey Chavous, and Justin Walters

Scoring summary
1	8:51	CHAR	Grant DUBOSE 56 Yd pass from Chris REYNOLDS (Jonathan CRUZ Kick)	CHAR 7–0
2	10:22	CHAR	Jonathan CRUZ 32 Yd Field Goal	CHAR 10–0
2	8:22	DUKE	Jordan WATERS 43 Yd pass from Gunnar HOLMBERG (Charlie HAM Kick)	CHAR 10–7
2	2:57	DUKE	Mataeo DURANT 5 Yd Run (Charlie HAM Kick)	DUKE 14–10
3	9:54	CHAR	Chris REYNOLDS 1 Yd Run (Jonathan CRUZ Kick)	CHAR 17–14
4	13:07	DUKE	Mataeo DURANT 59 Yd Run (Charlie HAM Kick)	DUKE 21–17
4	2:59	CHAR	Grant DUBOSE 9 Yd pass from Chris REYNOLDS (Jonathan CRUZ Kick)	CHAR 24–21
4	1:44	DUKE	Mataeo DURANT 53 Yd Run (Charlie HAM Kick)	DUKE 28–24
4	0:33	CHAR	Shadrick BYRD 11 Yd pass from Chris REYNOLDS (Jonathan CRUZ Kick)	CHAR 31–28

Following the previous year's drubbing in Durham, the 49ers were looking to regain their pride against the Blue Devils in the first full stadium home game since the 2019 season. The 49ers would score first in the first quarter on a Grant DuBose reception from Chris Reynolds and pad their lead early in the second quarter on a Jonathan Cruz 32 yard field goal. But the Blue Devils would find the endzone midway through the quarter and then take their first lead near the end of the half behind Mataeo Durant's first of three rushing touchdowns to take a 14 to 10 lead into the locker rooms.

Charlotte would regain the lead in the third quarter only to lose it again early in the fourth quarter. With three minutes left Charlotte would again take the lead only to see the Blue Devils again on top of the scoreboard with less than two minutes in regulation. Reynolds would then orchestrate a seven-play drive downfield that resulted in an eleven-yard touchdown pass to Shadrick Byrd with only thirty-three seconds left on the clock. With time expired Duke attempted a hook-and-ladder play, but the 49ers would stop it cold and gain their first victory over a Power 5 and ACC opponent in program history.

Top performances for the game included Charlotte's Chris Reynolds, who threw for 324 yards and three touchdowns. Duke's Mataeo Durant had 29 carries for 255 yards and 3 touchdowns. The 49er's Victor Tucker had 8 receptions for 133 yards. Charlotte's Grant DuBose also had 118 yards receiving with two touchdowns in his 49ers debut.

Game notes:

- Charlotte's first victory over a Power 5 conference team and a team from the ACC.
- First time the 49ers have hosted a Power 5 conference team.
- The win was also Coach Healy's first victory over a Power 5 opponent.
- Chris Reynold's is now 39 yards away from breaking Matt Johnson's all-time passing record (5405 yards).
- Reynolds is also chasing Johnson's all-time passing touchdowns record, just 3 shy of Johnson's 42 career TDs.
- Reynolds was named Conference USA Offensive Player of the Week.
- Markees Watts' single sack placed him a half-sack away from Larry Ogunjobi's (13.0) number 2 spot on the 49ers all-time sack record. Alex Highsmith has the current career sack record with 20.0.
- Charlotte received votes for the first time in the National Coaches Poll after the win.
- 2nd game in the series since 2020 (Tied 1–1).

=== Gardner–Webb ===
Gardner–Webb vs Charlotte

Team	1	2	3	4	Total
Runnin' Bulldogs	3	7	0	0	10
• 49ers	14	14	7	3	38

- Date: September 11
- Location: Jerry Richardson Stadium
  Charlotte, NC
- Game start: 6:04 pm EDT
- Elapsed time: 3:15
- Game attendance: 12,274
- Game weather: 81 °F (27 °C) • Weather: Sunny • Wind: SW 5 MPH
- Referee: Joe Lehring
- TV announcers (ESPN3): Jack Fitzpatrick, Reggie Walker Jr.

Scoring summary
1	12:08	CHAR	Chris REYNOLDS 37 Yd Run (Jonathan CRUZ Kick)	CHAR 7–0
1	8:31	GWU	Austin MCKAY 45 Yd Field Goal	CHAR 7–3
1	1:32	CHAR	Shadrick BYRD 5 Yd Run (Jonathan CRUZ Kick)	CHAR 14–3
2	9:42	CHAR	Calvin CAMP 1 Yd Run (Jonathan CRUZ Kick)	CHAR 21–3
2	7:47	GWU	Narii GAITHER 14 Yd Run (Austin MCKAY Kick)	CHAR 21–10
2	3:43	CHAR	Jairus MACK 11 Yd pass from Chris REYNOLDS (Jonathan CRUZ Kick)	CHAR 28–10
3	10:52	CHAR	Chavon MCEACHERN 13 Yd Run (Jonathan CRUZ Kick)	CHAR 35–10
4	12:46	CHAR	Jonathan CRUZ 29 Yd Field Goal	CHAR 38–10

The 49ers were looking to build off of the previous week's success by dominating local rival Gardner-Webb Runnin' Bulldogs. Charlotte would find the endzone first and never really looked back as they were able to hold Gardner-Webb to 10 total points of offense. Charlotte's bend-but-don't-break defense allowed GWU to move the ball down the field but was able to frustrate most of the Runnin' Bulldogs' scoring attempts as the 49ers walked away with a 38 to 10 home victory.

Top performances of the game included the 49ers' Chris Reynolds who threw for 103 yards and a touchdown with 2 interceptions. Gardner-Webb's Narii Gaither had 16 carries for 82 yards and a touchdown. The Runnin' Bulldogs' Justin Franklin had 4 receptions for 53 yards.

Game notes:

- Chris Reynolds would connect to his favorite receiver of 4 years Victor Tucker on a 28 yard pass in the 3rd quarter to move into 1st place all-time on the 49ers passing yardage board. He'd finish the game with 5,469 career passing yards, moving past previous record holder Matt Johnson's 5,405 yards.
- Reynolds is now 2 passing touchdowns away from tying Johnson's career touchdown passes record (42).
- Markees Watts' sack in this game moved him past Larry Ogunjobi into second place on the 49ers career sacks list with 13.5 sacks.
- 4th game in the series since 2013, (Char. 3–1)

=== Georgia State ===
Charlotte vs Georgia State

Team	1	2	3	4	Total
49ers	0	7	2	0	9
• Panthers	0	7	6	7	20

- Date: September 18
- Location: Center Parc Stadium
  Atlanta, GA
- Game start: 7:05 pm EDT
- Elapsed time: 3:12
- Game attendance: 12,978
- Game weather: 78 °F (26 °C) • Weather: Cloudy• Wind: SW 4 MPH
- Referee: Kevin Vicknair
- TV announcers (ESPN+): Matt Stewart, Sam Crenshaw

Scoring summary
2	7:41	CHAR	Elijah SPENCER 36 Yd pass from Chris REYNOLDS (Jonathan CRUZ Kick)	CHAR 7–0
2	4:03	GAST	Jamari THRASH 35 Yd pass from Darren GRAINGER (Noel RUIZ Kick)	TIED 7–7
3	9:45	CHAR	Team Safety	CHAR 9–7
3	5:06	GAST	Ja'Cyais CREDEL 28 Yd pass from Darren GRAINGER (Noel RUIZ PAT blocked)	GAST 13–9
4	1:38	GAST	Jamyest WILLIAMS 13 Yd Run (Noel RUIZ Kick)	GAST 20–9

Rain and slick conditions would help turn this matchup into a ground and pound event dominated be defense. Charlotte would score first in the second quarter but Georgia State would tie it up moving into halftime.

The second half resulted in Charlotte retaking the lead on an intention grounding safety, but the Panthers would retake the lead before the end of the quarter. The 4th quarter was more of the same running game for both teams but Georgia State was able to find their running game rhythm and would put the game out of reach on a final touchdown with less than two minutes to go in the contest.

Georgia State dominated the top performances with Darren Grainger passing for 139 yards, 2 touchdowns and an interception. Running back Dustin Coates had 4 carries for 83 yards. Jamari Thrash had 2 receptions for 62 yards and a touchdown.

Game notes:

- The 2nd quarter touchdown pass from Chris Reynolds to Elijah Spencer was Reynolds' 41st career pass. He was one touchdown pass away from tying the 49ers career passing TD leader Matt Johnson (42).
- Jonathan Cruz broke the record for consecutive PATs, passing Blake Brewer's record of 46.
- The 49ers' first visit to Center Parc Stadium. The previous meeting in Atlanta took place in the Georgia Dome.
- 3rd game in the series since 2015, (GAST 2–1)

=== Middle Tennessee ===
Middle Tennessee vs Charlotte

Team	1	2	3	4	Total
Blue Raiders	7	10	7	15	39
• 49ers	14	0	14	14	42

- Date: September 24
- Location: Jerry Richardson Stadium
  Charlotte, NC
- Game start: 6:32 pm EDT
- Elapsed time: 3:44
- Game attendance: 11,076
- Game weather: 73 °F (23 °C) • Weather: Sunny • Wind: N 6 MPH
- Referee: Tony Johnson
- TV announcers (CBSSN): Chris Lewis, Corey Chavous

Scoring summary
1	7:25	CHAR	Grant DUBOSE 17 Yd pass from Chris REYNOLDS (Jonathan CRUZ Kick)	CHAR 7–0
1	3:27	MTSU	Jimmy MARSHALL 7 Yd pass from Chase CUNNINGHAM (Zeke RANKIN Kick)	TIED 7–7
1	0:57	CHAR	Grant DUBOSE 12 Yd pass from Chris REYNOLDS (Jonathan CRUZ Kick)	CHAR 14–7
2	11:15	MTSU	Jaylin LANE 24 Yd pass from Chase CUNNINGHAM (Zeke RANKIN Kick)	TIED 14–14
2	7:49	MTSU	Zeke RANKIN 26 Yd Field Goal	MTSU 17–14
3	7:04	CHAR	Elijah SPENCER 18 Yd pass from Chris REYNOLDS (Jonathan CRUZ Kick)	CHAR 21–17
3	6:16	MTSU	DJ ENGLAND-CHISOLM 51 Yd pass from Chase CUNNINGHAM (Zeke RANKIN Kick)	MTSU 24–21
3	0:00	CHAR	Calvin CAMP 44 Yd Run (Jonathan CRUZ Kick)	CHAR 28–24
4	10:27	CHAR	Shadrick BYRD 19 Yd pass from Chris REYNOLDS (Jonathan CRUZ Kick)	CHAR 35–24
4	8:21	MTSU	Jarrin PIERCE 16 Yd pass from Chase CUNNINGHAM (Chase CUNNINGHAM Pass to Jaylin LANE for Two-Point Conversion)	CHAR 35–32
4	4:00	CHAR	Chris REYNOLDS 1 Yd run (Jonathan CRUZ kick)	CHAR 42–32
4	2:12	MTSU	Yusuf ALI 12 Yd pass from Chase CUNNINGHAM (Zeke RANKIN Kick)	CHAR 42–39

Charlotte would score first only to have Middle Tennessee tie it up before a go ahead touchdown would again give the 49ers the lead. In the 2nd quarter the Blue Raiders would tie the game up again and take their first lead into halftime off a field goal.

Charlotte and Middle Tennessee would again swap leads in the 3rd quarter with the 49ers up heading into the 4th quarter. The 49ers would stretch their lead to 11 points early in the 4th only to see the Blue Raiders cut the lead down to 3 points after a successful two-point conversion. Charlotte would then tack on another touchdown only to see the Blue Raiders again cut the lead to 3 points with slightly more than 2 minutes left in the game, but Middle Tennessee's on-sides kick attempt would fail and with no time outs left the 49ers were able to take a knee to their 3rd home victory of the season.

Top performers of the game included Middle Tennessee's Chase Cunningham who passed for 379 yards and 5 touchdowns. The 49ers' Chris Reynolds would match Cunningham's touchdown performance with 339 yards of passing with 4 passing touchdowns and a 1 yard rushing touchdown. Charlotte's Calvin Camp had 12 carries for 101 yards and a touchdown. The 49ers' Grant DuBose had 9 receptions for 14 yards and 2 touchdowns.

Game notes:

- Chris Reynold's 4 passing touchdowns in the game moved him past Matt Johnson (42) with 45 career touchdown passes making him the new career passing leader.
- Reynolds also added a rushing touchdown for 5 total touchdowns in the game.
- Reynold's received his 2nd Conference USA Offensive Player of the Week award for the season.
- Grant DuBose (114 receiving), Victor Tucker (108 receiving), and Clavin Camp (101 rushing) all had 100 yard performances in the game.
- 6th game in the series since 2015, (MT 4–2).

=== Illinois ===
Charlotte vs Illinois

Team	1	2	3	4	Total
49ers	7	7	0	0	14
• Fighting Illini	3	7	14	0	24

- Date: October 2
- Location: Memorial Stadium (Champaign)
  Champaign, IL
- Game start: 11:01 p.m. CDT
- Elapsed time: 3:02
- Game attendance: 30,559
- Game weather: 73 °F (23 °C) • Weather: Cloudy • Wind: SE 5 MPH
- Referee: Reggie Smith
- TV announcers (BTN): Chris Vosters, Stanley Jackson, Krystle Rich

Scoring summary
1	7:28	ILLI	James MCCOURT 29 Yd Field Goal	ILLI 3-0
1	1:31	CHAR	Victor TUCKER 22 Yd pass from Chris REYNOLDS (Jonathan CRUZ Kick)	CHAR 7-3
2	2:52	ILLI	Daniel BARKER 10 Yd pass from Brandon PETERS (James MCCOURT Kick)	ILLI 10-7
2	0:46	CHAR	Elijah SPENCER 27 Yd pass from Chris REYNOLDS (Jonathan CRUZ Kick)	CHAR 14-10
3	6:52	ILLI	Chase BROWN 31 Yd Run (James MCCOURT Kick)	ILLI 17-14
3	0:00	ILLI	Chase BROWN 80 Yd Run (James MCCOURT Kick)	ILLI 24-14

The game got off to a slow start with the Illini making a field goal halfway through the first quarter and Charlotte answering with a touchdown right before the second quarter. The Illini would finally find the endzone with less than three minutes left in the half only to have the 49ers answer with a touchdown of their on to take a 14 to 10 lead into the halftime.

The Illini would retake the lead midway through the third quarter. Charlotte would get into comfortable field goal range in the last seconds of the quarter to attempt to tie the game only to have the ball drift wide right. On the next play from scrimmage the Illini would tack on an 80 yard touchdown run. The Illini would then use ball control running plays to eat up the clock and walk away with a 24 to 14 home victory.

Top performances of the game included Charlotte's Chris Reynolds, who threw for 191 yards, two touchdowns and an interception. The Fighting Illini's Chase Brown had 26 carries for 257 yards and two touchdowns. The 49ers' Grant DuBose had four receptions for 70 yards.

Game notes:

- First 49ers game in the State of Illinois.
- First game against a Big Ten Conference opponent.
- First time the 49ers have played two Power 5 conference teams in a single season.
- Chris Reynolds became the first 49ers passer to cross the 6000 yards mark.
- Victor Tucker moved into a 2nd place tie with Trent Bostick for career touchdown receptions with 12.
- First game in series history.

=== FIU ===
Charlotte vs FIU

Team	1	2	3	4	Total
• 49ers	7	10	14	14	45
Panthers	3	3	7	20	33

- Date: October 8
- Location: Riccardo Silva Stadium
  Miami, FL
- Game start: 7:03 pm EDT
- Elapsed time: 3:36
- Game attendance: 0
- Game weather: 82 °F (28 °C) • Weather: Cloudy • Wind: 0 MPH
- Referee: Joe Lehring
- TV announcers (CBSSN): Chris Lewis, Donte Whitner

Scoring summary
1	8:59	FIU	Chase GABRIEL 26 Yd Field Goal	FIU 3-0
1	5:15	CHAR	Calvin CAMP 2 Yd Run (Jonathan CRUZ Kick)	CHAR 7-3
2	9:21	CHAR	Taylor THOMPSON 5 Yd pass from Chris REYNOLDS (Jonathan CRUZ Kick)	CHAR 14-3
2	4:49	FIU	Chase GABRIEL 43 Yd Field Goal	CHAR 14-6
2	0:03	CHAR	Jonathan CRUZ 42 Yd Field Goal	CHAR 17-6
3	11:58	CHAR	Victor TUCKER 22 Yd pass from Chris REYNOLDS (Jonathan CRUZ Kick)	CHAR 24-6
3	11:25	FIU	Kris MITCHELL 50 Yd pass from Max BORTENSCHLAGER (Chase GABRIEL Kick)	CHAR 24-13
3	3:46	CHAR	Jake CLEMONS 1 Yd pass from Chris REYNOLDS (Jonathan CRUZ Kick)	CHAR 31-13
4	11:10	FIU	Tyrese CHAMBERS 59 Yd pass from Max BORTENSCHLAGER (Chase GABRIEL Kick)	CHAR 31-20
4	5:45	CHAR	Jonathan ALEXANDER 41 Yd Interception Return (Jonathan CRUZ Kick)	CHAR 38-20
4	5:35	FIU	Tyrese CHAMBERS 75 Yd pass from Max BORTENSCHLAGER (Chase GABRIEL Kick)	CHAR 38-27
4	2:36	CHAR	Ryan CARRIERE 4 Yd pass from Chris REYNOLDS (Jonathan CRUZ Kick)	CHAR 45-27
4	0:14	FIU	Sterling PALMER 8 Yd pass from Max BORTENSCHLAGER (Chase GABRIEL PAT failed)	CHAR 45-33

The game Started slow with Charlotte answering FIU's field goal with a touchdown. The 49ers would pad their lead in the 2nd quarter with another touchdown before both teams traded field goals before the half. Charlotte hit the locker rooms with a 17 to 6 lead.

Charlotte would stretch the lead out to 18 early in the 2nd half, but two plays later FIU would find the endzone for the first time in the game. Charlotte would go back out to an 18 point lead before the start of the last quarter with a 21 to 3 lead.

Both teams would score as many touchdowns in the 4th quarter as they had in the entire rest of the game combined. FIU would pull back to within 11 points early in the quarter. With less than six minutes left on the clock the 49ers again would go out to an 18 point lead on a Jon Alexander interception return, only to have the Panthers score on the very next play. The Panthers looked like they might have recovered the ensuing on-sides kick, but the ball didn't cross the 10 yard mark by mere inches. The 49ers would capitalize on the turnover and again reach the magic number 18 with less than 3 minutes on the clock. FIU would get it to within 12 points with less than 15 seconds on the clock, but the on-sides kick attempt this time was easily recovered by the 49ers who would leave Miami with a 45 to 33 win.

Both quarterbacks, Charlotte's Chris Reynolds and FIU's Matt Bortenschlager, put up four touchdown passes each, Reynolds for 203 yards and Bortenschlager for an impressive 466 yards and an interception. FIU's D'vonte Price rushed for 89 yards on 18 carries. The Panthers' Tyrese Chambers had 3 receptions for 201 yards and two touchdowns.

Game notes:

- First victory for Charlotte over FIU, who was the last team in CUSA's Eastern Division that Charlotte had never defeated.
- Shadrick Byrd was named Conference USA Special Teams Player of the Week.
- 6th game in the series since 2015, (FIU 5–1).

=== Florida Atlantic ===
Florida Atlantic vs Charlotte

Team	1	2	3	4	Total
• Owls	0	7	21	10	38
49ers	3	6	0	0	9

- Date: October 21
- Location: Jerry Richardson Stadium
  Charlotte, NC
- Game start: 7:32 pm EDT
- Elapsed time: 3:12
- Game attendance: 13,017
- Game weather: 73 °F (23 °C) • Weather: Cloudy • Wind: SW 10 MPH
- Referee: Kevin Randall
- TV announcers (CBSSN): Jason Horowitz, Ross Tucker

Scoring summary
1	3:19	CHAR	Jonathan CRUZ 23 Yd Field Goal	CHAR 3-0
2	12:32	FAU	TJ CHASE 8 Yd pass from N'Kosi PERRY (Aaron SHAHRIARI Kick)	FAU 7-3
2	0:00	CHAR	Grant DUBOSE 1 Yd pass from Chris REYNOLDS (Jonathan CRUZ PAT failed)	CHAR 9-7
3	13:38	FAU	Johnny FORD 32 Yd pass from N'Kosi PERRY (Aaron SHAHRIARI Kick)	FAU 14-9
3	7:11	FAU	Malcolm DAVIDSON 9 Yd Run (Aaron SHAHRIARI Kick)	FAU 21-9
3	1:06	FAU	Brandon ROBINSON 30 Yd pass from N'Kosi PERRY (Aaron SHAHRIARI Kick)	FAU 28-9
4	9:09	FAU	Aaron SHAHRIARI 27 Yd Field Goal	FAU 31-9
4	7:14	FAU	Johnny FORD 1 Yd Run (Aaron SHAHRIARI Kick)	FAU 38-9

Both teams, coming off bye weeks, would start the game slowly with Charlotte parting the uprights in the first quarter and FAU getting the first touchdown near the end of the second quarter. With no time left in the half Charlotte would find the endzone to take a lead into the locker rooms at halftime, but the rare missed PAT from Jonathan Cruz would seem to be a harbinger of what was to come in the second half for the 49ers.

FAU would retake the lead on the first series of the second half and never look back. They would add two more touchdowns before the fourth quarter and pad their lead in the final quarter with a field goal and a final touchdown to win 38 to 9.

Top performers of the game included Florida Atlantic quarterback N'Kosi Perry, who threw for 225 yards and three touchdowns. The Owls' Johnny Ford rushed for 92 yards on 8 carries with a touchdown. Charlotte's Victor Tucker had 6 receptions for 105 yards.

Game notes:

- 7th game in the series since 2015, (FAU 5–2).

=== Western Kentucky ===
Charlotte vs Western Kentucky

Team	1	2	3	4	Total
49ers	3	10	0	0	13
• Hilltoppers	14	14	7	10	45

- Date: October 30
- Location: Houchens Industries-L. T. Smith Stadium
  Bowling Green, KY
- Game start: 4:05 pm EDT
- Elapsed time: 3:11
- Game attendance: 16,763
- Game weather: 55 °F (13 °C) • Weather: Rainy • Wind: 0 MPH
- Referee: Scott Hardin
- TV announcers (ESPN+): Nate Gatter, Bob Belvin

Scoring summary
1	11:44	WKU	Daewood DAVIS 11 Yd pass from Bailey Zappe (Brayden NARVESON Kick)	WKU 7-0
1	6:39	CHAR	Jonathan CRUZ 37 Yd Field Goal	WKU 7-3
1	1:21	WKU	Bailey ZAPPE 2 Yd Run (Brayden NARVESON Kick)	WKU 17-3
2	13:09	WKU	Mitchell TINSLEY 13 Yd pass from Bailey ZAPPE (Brayden NARVESON Kick)	WKU 21-3
2	9:40	CHAR	James FOSTER 1 Yd Run (Jonathan CRUZ Kick)	WKU 21-10
2	3:06	CHAR	Jonathan CRUZ 56 Yd Field Goal	WKU 21-13
2	1:27	WKU	Jerreth Sterns 21 Yd pass from Bailey ZAPPE (Brayden NARVESON Kick)	WKU 28-13
3	2:04	WKU	Dalvin SMITH 9 Yd pass from Bailey ZAPPE (Brayden NARVESON Kick)	WKU 35-13
4	12:28	WKU	Brayden NARVESON 35 Yd Field Goal	WKU 38-13
4	5:09	WKU	Noah WHITTINGTON 1 Yd Run (Brayden NARVESON Kick)	WKU 45-13

In a light rain the 49ers struggled behind backup quarterback James Foster to establish an offensive rhythm. This was not an issue WKU had as they scored first in the game and already had 4 touchdowns before the half. Charlotte would split the uprights twice and find the endzone once to keep the game within reach heading into the locker rooms, 28 to 13.

The second half would be significantly less active, but it was all Hilltoppers, adding two more touchdowns and a field goal to put the game safely in their pocket. The final score was WKU 45, Charlotte 13.

Top performances of the game were dominated by the Hilltopper's, whose Bailey Zappe threw for 393 yards, 4 touchdowns and 2 interceptions on his way to collecting a CUSA Offensive Player of the Week Award. Noah Whittingham rushed for 66 yards on 10 carries for a touchdown. Jerreth Sterns had 10 receptions for 89 yards and a touchdown.

Game notes:

- Jonathan Cruz's 56 yard field goal tied his own school record.
- The 56 yard field goal also matched the season longest NCAA field goal up to that point in the season.
- 5th game in the series since 2017, (WKU 4–1).

=== Rice ===
Rice vs Charlotte

Team	1	2	3	4	OT	Total
Owls	0	7	10	7	0	24
• 49ers	7	7	0	10	7	31

- Date: November 6
- Location: Jerry Richardson Stadium
  Charlotte, NC
- Game start: 3:35 pm EDT
- Elapsed time: 3:30
- Game attendance: 16,050
- Game weather: 56 °F (13 °C) • Weather: Cloudy • Wind: S 15 MPH
- Referee: Kevin Randall
- TV announcers (ESPN+): Bobby Rosinski, Reggie Walker Jr.

Scoring summary
1	4:37	CHAR	Calvin CAMP 53 Yd pass from Chris REYNOLDS (Jonathan CRUZ Kick)	CHAR 7-0
2	11:29	RICE	Ari BROUSSARD 22 Yd Run (Christian VANSICKLE Kick)	TIED 7-7
2	7:49	CHAR	Shadrick BYRD 1 Yd Run (Jonathan CRUZ Kick)	CHAR 14-7
3	8:01	RICE	Christian VANSICKLE 25 Yd Field Goal	CHAR 14-10
3	2:48	RICE	Jordan MYERS 1 Yd Run (Christian VANSICKLE Kick)	RICE 17-14
4	6:35	RICE	Ari BROUSSARD 2 Yd Run (Christian VANSICKLE Kick)	RICE 24-14
4	4:09	CHAR	Jonathan CRUZ 32 Yd Field Goal	RICE 24-17
4	1:14	CHAR	Elijah SPENCER 8 Yd pass from Chris REYNOLDS (Jonathan CRUZ Kick)	TIED 24-24
OT	OT	CHAR	Elijah SPENCER 25 Yd pass from Chris REYNOLDS (Jonathan CRUZ Kick)	CHAR 31-24

Charlotte scored first on the windy afternoon in the first quarter. Rice would answer early in the 2nd quarter to tie it up but mid-way through that quarter the 49ers would again find the endzone to take a 14 to 7 lead in at the half.

Rice split the uprights midway through the 3rd quarter after the 49ers turned it over in the redzone. Rice would take their first lead of the game late in the third quarter and early in the fourth quarter would extended it to a two score lead. The 49ers again would find the redzone but would be forced to settle for a field goal to get it back down to a one score game. With less than a minute and a half left in regulation Chris Reynolds would find Elijah Spencer in the corner of the endzone to tie the game for the second time. Rice would go 4 and out and Charlotte would take their chances in overtime.

Charlotte took possession first in the overtime and on the first play Reynolds again would find Spencer to take a 7 point lead. On their second play of the overtime Rice's Jake Constantine would be flushed from the pocket and throw up a game winning interception to Charlotte's Luke Martin, securing the overtime win for the 49ers at 31 to 24.

Top performances of the game included Charlotte's Chris Reynolds, who threw for 292 yards and 3 touchdowns. Rice's Ari Broussard had 20 carries for 186 yards and 2 touchdowns. The 49ers' Elijah Spencer had 6 receptions for 77 yards and 2 touchdowns.

Game notes:

- 49th home game at Richardson Stadium for the 49ers.
- 49th Conference USA game for the 49ers.
- First overtime game for the 49ers since the 2017 season.
- 3rd game in the series since 2015, (Rice 2–1).

=== Louisiana Tech ===
Charlotte vs Louisiana Tech

Team	1	2	3	4	Total
49ers	0	7	10	15	32
• Bulldogs	7	7	14	14	42

- Date: November 13
- Location: Joe Aillet Stadium
  Ruston, LA
- Game start: 3:36 pm EST
- Elapsed time: 3:30
- Game attendance: 14,068
- Game weather: 58 °F (14 °C) • Weather: Sunny • Wind: 0 MPH
- Referee: Ed Ardito
- TV announcers (Stadium): Chris Hassel, Sed Bonner

Scoring summary
1	3:16	LTECH	Marcus WILLIAMS Jr. 2 Yd Run (Jacob BARNES Kick)	LTECH 7-0
2	5:55	CHAR	Shadrick BYRD 1 Yd Run (Jonathan CRUZ Kick)	TIED 7-7
2	1:38	LTECH	Marcus WILLIAMS Jr. 8 Yd Run (Jacob BARNES Kick)	LTECH 14-7
3	12:58	LTECH	Marcus WILLIAMS Jr. 6 Yd Run (Jacob BARNES Kick)	LTECH 21-7
3	9:06	CHAR	Jonathan CRUZ 26 Yd Field Goal	LTECH 21-10
3	7:22	LTECH	Isaiah GRAHAM 32 Yd pass from Aaron ALLEN (Jacob BARNES Kick)	LTECH 28-10
3	3:52	CHAR	Chris REYNOLDS 12 Yd Run (Jonathan CRUZ Kick)	LTECH 28-17
4	13:36	LTECH	Smoke HARRIS 17 Yd pass from Aaron ALLEN (Jacob BARNES Kick)	LTECH 35-17
4	12:18	CHAR	Keith PEARSON 18 Yd pass from Chris REYNOLDS (Chris REYNOLDS Pass to Keith PEARSON	LTECH 35-25
4	11:06	LTECH	Marcus WILLIAMS Jr. 25 Yd Run (Jacob BARNES Kick)	LTECH 42-25
4	8:44	CHAR	Keith PEARSON 21 Yd pass from Chris REYNOLDS (Jonathan CRUZ Kick)	LTECH 42-32

In the first ever match between these conference foes the Louisiana Tech Bulldogs, already eliminated from bowl contention, got to play spoiler to the 49ers who were still seeking their second bowl qualification in program history.

The game started slow with the Bulldogs taking the early lead at home, but the 49ers would tie the game up before the Bulldogs would score again to take a 14 to 7 lead into the half.

Once again Charlotte experienced a second half change in pace as the Bulldogs early in the third quarter took a commanding two score lead. The 49ers would gain a field goal and a touchdown in the quarter but La. Tech would also find the end zone again to preserve a two score lead heading into the last quarter of play. Charlotte would add two more touchdowns in the fourth quarter but so would the Bulldogs who would win the battle at home to the score of 42 to 32, denying Charlotte a bowl qualification for at least another week and continuing Charlotte's road winless tour.

Top performances for the game included Charlotte's Chris Reynolds, who threw for 448 yards with 2 touchdowns and an interception. The Bulldogs' Marcus Williams Jr. rushed for 131 yards on 29 carries with 4 touchdowns. The 49ers' Keith Pearson had 6 receptions for 150 yards and 2 touchdowns.

Game notes:

- First time the 49ers will visit the State of Louisiana.
- First time these two cross-division conference mates will meet.
- Chris Reynold's 448 passing yards set a new school single-game record.
- Reynold's became the first 49ers' passer to cross 7,000 career passing yards.
- Louisiana Tech is the final team in Conference USA the 49ers have yet to play.

=== Marshall ===
Marshall vs Charlotte

Team	1	2	3	4	Total
• Thundering Herd	7	14	21	7	49
49ers	7	7	0	14	28

- Date: November 20
- Location: Jerry Richardson Stadium
  Charlotte, NC
- Game start: 3:37 pm EST
- Elapsed time: 3:14
- Game attendance: 13,211
- Game weather: 54 °F (12 °C) • Weather: Sunny • Wind: S 3 MPH
- Referee: Patrick Foy
- TV announcers (Stadium): Josh Appel, Patrick Russell

Scoring summary
1	8:42	CHAR	Keith PEARSON 6 Yd pass from Chris REYNOLDS (Jonathan CRUZ Kick)	CHAR 7-0
1	5:14	MARS	Rasheen ALI 25 Yd Run (Shane CIUCCI Kick)	TIED 7-7
2	12:12	MARS	Rasheen ALI 5 Yd Run (Shane CIUCCI Kick)	MARS 14-7
2	4:13	CHAR	Cameron DOLLAR 21 Yd pass from Chris REYNOLDS (Jonathan CRUZ Kick)	TIED 14-14
2	3:26	MARS	Corey GAMMAGE 64 Yd pass from Grant Wells (Shane CIUCCI Kick)	MARS 21-14
3	11:49	MARS	Xavier GAINES 22 Yd pass from Grant WELLS (Shane CIUCCI Kick)	MARS 28-14
3	7:45	MARS	Sheldon EVANS 15 Yd Run (Shane CIUCCI Kick)	MARS 35-14
3	2:07	MARS	Rasheen ALI 4 Yd Run (Shane CIUCCI Kick)	MARS 42-14
4	11:37	CHAR	Cameron DOLLAR 4 Yd pass from Chris REYNOLDS (Jonathan CRUZ Kick)	MARS 42-21
4	8:36	MARS	Sheldon EVANS 25 Yd Run (Shane CIUCCI Kick)	MARS 49-21
4	4:33	CHAR	ChaVon MCEACHERN 5 Yd pass from James FOSTER (Jonathan CRUZ Kick)	MARS 49-28

Charlotte would find the endzone first to take the early lead before Marshall would tie the game going into the second quarter. The Herd would take the lead early in the second quarter before the 49ers would again tie the score before a late Marshall touchdown let them take a 21 to 14 lead in at the half.

Charlotte's second half woes would again plague the team as Marshall rattled off three third quarter touchdowns, and their fourth touchdown in a row, before the Niners could answer early in the fourth quarter. The teams would exchange two more touchdowns to end the game behind both teams' second-string quarterbacks but the game was effectively over in the third quarter with Marshall winning 49 to 28.

Top performers of the game included Charlotte's Chris Reynolds, who threw for 178 yards with 3 touchdowns and an interception on his way to setting a new program single season touchdown record. Marshall's Rasheen Ali rushed for 203 yards on 23 carries for 3 touchdowns. The Herds' Corey Gammage had 3 receptions for 78 yards and a touchdown

Game notes:

- 100th game in Charlotte program history.
- Chris Reynold's 3 touchdown passes in the game broke his own single season touchdown record (24 vs 22).
- 6th game in the series since 2015, (Mar. 4–2).

=== Old Dominion ===
Charlotte vs Old Dominion

Team	1	2	3	4	Total
49ers	0	14	14	6	34
• Monarchs	14	14	7	21	56

- Date: November 27
- Location: S.B. Ballard Stadium
  Norfolk, VA
- Game start: 2:05 pm EST
- Elapsed time: 3:48
- Game attendance: 15,874
- Game weather: 45 °F (7 °C) • Weather: Sunny • Wind: 0 MPH
- Referee: Kevin Randall
- TV announcers (ESPN+): Ted Alexander, Andy Mashaw, James Witham

Scoring summary
1	9:15	ODU	Nick Saldiveri 0 Yd Run (Nick RICE Kick)	ODU 7-0
1	2:51	ODU	Elijah DAVIS 12 Yd Run (Nick RICE Kick)	ODU 14-0
2	12:11	ODU	Ali JENNINGS III 46 Yd pass from Hayden WOLFF (Nick RICE Kick)	ODU 21-0
2	10:45	CHAR	Elijah SPENCER 19 Yd pass from Chris REYNOLDS (Jonathan CRUZ Kick)	ODU 21-7
2	7:40	ODU	Ali JENNINGS III 34 Yd pass from Hayden WOLFF (Nick RICE Kick)	ODU 28-7
2	2:59	CHAR	Luke MARTIN 8 Yd Interception Return (Jonathan CRUZ Kick)	ODU 28-14
3	10:49	CHAR	Grant DUBOSE 9 Yd pass from Chris REYNOLDS (Jonathan Cruz Kick)	ODU 28-21
3	6:06	CHAR	Calvin CAMP 6 Yd Run (Jonathan CRUZ Kick)	TIED 28-28
3	3:25	ODU	Blake WATSON 3 Yd Run (Nick RICE Kick)	ODU 35-28
4	13:09	CHAR	Jonathan CRUZ 39 Yd Field Goal	ODU 35-31
4	10:04	CHAR	Jonathan CRUZ 44 Yd Field Goal	ODU 35-34
4	6:42	ODU	Blake WATSON 2 Yd Run (Nick RICE Kick)	ODU 42-34
4	3:49	ODU	Ali JENNINGS III 36 Yd pass from Hayden WOLFF (Nick RICE Kick)	ODU 49-34
4	2:52	ODU	Deeve HARRIS 1 Yd Fumble Return (Nick RICE Kick)	ODU 56-34

Both teams in this contest need the win to become bowl eligible. Old Dominion had turned a 1-6 start into 5 straight wins. Charlotte had lost 4 of 5 after starting the season 4-2. For these two teams on different wave trajectories, this battle was critical to continue their seasons for a bowl game.

After the usual slow start for the 49ers the Monarchs rattled off two 1st quarter touchdowns and started the 2nd quarter with another to take an early commanding lead before Charlotte would find the endzone. ODU would score again before Charlotte's Luke Martin would intercept a batted pass and return it for the 49ers' second score of the game. The Monarchs took a 28 and 14 lead in at the half.

The start of the 2nd half would be Charlotte's turn to score as tow touchdowns in the 3rd quarter tied the game up at 28-all before ODU would tack on a touchdown to retake the lead heading into the final quarter of regulation. Charlotte would get into ODU's half of the field twice early in the 4th quarter but would have to settle for twin Jonathan Cruz field goals to make it a 1 point game, but with less than 7 minutes left in the game ODU would score two offensive touchdowns and return a 49ers' fumble for a third touchdown to win the game 56 to 34.

Old Dominion dominated the top performances of the game with Hayden Wolff throwing fir 328 yards, 3 touchdowns and 2 interceptions. Blake Watson rushed for 106 yards on 18 carries for 2 touchdowns. Ali Jennings III had 9 receptions for 252 yards and 3 touchdowns.

Game notes:

- Charlotte's first time visiting the newly rebuilt S.B. Ballard Stadium.
- Charlotte's 2nd Oyster Bowl, the series is tied 1-1.
- Chris Reynolds set a new single season passing record for the 49ers with 2,684 yards.
- 6th game in the series since 2015, (ODU 4–2).

== Attendance ==
Season	Games	Sellouts	W–L (%)	Attendance	Average	Best
2021	6	1	4–2 (.667)	79,753	13,292	16,050
