= 2021 Western Kentucky Hilltoppers football team =

American college football season

2021 Western Kentucky Hilltoppers football

C-USA East Division champion Boca Raton Bowl champion

C-USA Championship Game, L 41–49 vs. UTSA

Boca Raton Bowl, W 59–38 vs. Appalachian State
- Conference: Conference USA
- East Division
- Record: 9–5 (7–1 C-USA)
- Head coach: Tyson Helton (3rd season)
- Offensive coordinator: Zach Kittley (1st season)
- Co-offensive coordinator: Bryan Ellis (3rd season)
- Offensive scheme: Air raid
- Defensive coordinator: Maurice Crum Jr. (2nd season)
- Base defense: 4–2–5
- Home stadium: Houchens Industries–L. T. Smith Stadium

2021 Conference USA football standings
	Conf.			Overall
Team	W		L	W		L
East Division
Western Kentucky xy	7	–	1	9	–	5
Marshall	5	–	3	7	–	6
Old Dominion	5	–	3	6	–	7
Middle Tennessee	4	–	4	7	–	6
Florida Atlantic	3	–	5	5	–	7
Charlotte	3	–	5	5	–	7
FIU	0	–	8	1	–	11
West Division
UTSA xy$	7	–	1	12	–	2
UAB	6	–	2	9	–	4
North Texas	5	–	3	6	–	7
UTEP	4	–	4	7	–	6
Rice	3	–	5	4	–	8
Southern Miss	2	–	6	3	–	9
Louisiana Tech	2	–	6	3	–	9
Championship: UTSA 49, Western Kentucky 41
$ – Conference champion; x – Division champion/co-champions; y – Championship game participant

The 2021 Western Kentucky Hilltoppers football team represented Western Kentucky University during the 2021 NCAA Division I FBS football season. The Hilltoppers played their home games at Houchens Industries–L. T. Smith Stadium in Bowling Green, Kentucky, and competed in the East Division of Conference USA (CUSA). The team was coached by third-year head coach Tyson Helton.

== Schedule ==
Western Kentucky announced its 2021 football schedule on January 27, 2021. The 2021 schedule consisted of 6 home and 6 away games in the regular season.

Date	Time	Opponent	Site	TV	Result	Attendance
September 2	7:00 p.m.	UT Martin*	Houchens Industries–L. T. Smith Stadium; Bowling Green, KY	ESPN+	W 59–21	16,236
September 11	11:00 a.m.	at Army*	Michie Stadium; West Point, NY	CBSSN	L 35–38	25,989
September 25	7:00 p.m.	Indiana*	Houchens Industries–L. T. Smith Stadium; Bowling Green, KY	CBSSN	L 31–33	25,171
October 2	6:30 p.m.	at No. 17 Michigan State*	Spartan Stadium; East Lansing, MI	FS1	L 31–48	70,075
October 9	6:00 p.m.	UTSA	Houchens Industries–L. T. Smith Stadium; Bowling Green, KY	Stadium	L 46–52	15,243
October 16	2:30 p.m.	at Old Dominion	S.B. Ballard Stadium; Norfolk, VA	ESPN3	W 43–20	16,418
October 23	6:00 p.m.	at FIU	Riccardo Silva Stadium; Miami, FL	ESPN+	W 34–19	0
October 30	3:00 p.m.	Charlotte^{†}	Houchens Industries–L. T. Smith Stadium; Bowling Green, KY	ESPN+	W 45–13	16,763
November 6	2:30 p.m.	Middle Tennessee	Houchens Industries–L. T. Smith Stadium; Bowling Green, KY (100 Miles of Hate)	Stadium	W 48–21	15,022
November 13	1:00 p.m.	at Rice	Rice Stadium; Houston, TX	ESPN+	W 42–21	17,883
November 20	11:00 a.m.	Florida Atlantic	Houchens Industries–L. T. Smith Stadium; Bowling Green, KY	Stadium	W 52–17	10,477
November 27	2:30 p.m.	at Marshall	Joan C. Edwards Stadium; Huntington, WV	CBSSN	W 53–21	19,134
December 3	6:00 p.m.	at UTSA	Alamodome; San Antonio, TX (C-USA Championship Game)	CBSSN	L 41–49	41,148
December 18	10:00 a.m.	vs. Appalachian State*	FAU Stadium; Boca Raton, FL (Boca Raton Bowl)	ESPN	W 59–38	15,429
*Non-conference game; ^{†}Homecoming; Rankings from AP Poll and CFP Rankings released prior to game; All times are in Central time

Schedule source:

== Game summaries ==
=== UT Martin ===
Tennessee–Martin at Western Kentucky

Team	1	2	3	4	Total
Skyhawks	7	7	0	7	21
• Hilltoppers	7	21	14	14	56

- Date: September 2, 2021
- Location: Houchens Industries–L. T. Smith Stadium
  Bowling Green, KY
- Game start: 7:05 p.m. CDT
- Elapsed time: 3 hours and 32 minutes
- Game attendance: 16,236
- Game weather: 79 °F (26 °C) • Weather: Clear
- Referee: Kevin Randle
- TV announcers (ESPN+): Graham Doty (play-by-play) and Bob Belvin (analyst)

Scoring summary
1	11:04	UTM	Keon Howard 2-yard rush (Tyler Larco kick) (10 plays, 75 yards, 3:56)	UTM 7–0
1	04:09	WKU	Daewood Davis 73-yard pass from Bailey Zappe (Brayden Narveson kick) (2 plays, 75 yards, 0:41)	TIE 7–7
2	14:56	WKU	Mitchell Tinsley 10-yard pass from Bailey Zappe (Brayden Narveson kick) (6 plays, 55 yards, 2:36)	WKU 14–7
2	09:31	WKU	Jerreth Sterns 22-yard pass from Bailey Zappe (Brayden Narveson kick) (6 plays, 59 yards, 2:40)	WKU 21–7
2	01:43	WKU	Malachi Corley 8-yard pass from Bailey Zappe (Brayden Narveson kick) (12 plays, 79 yards, 4:58)	WKU 28–7
2	00:10	UTM	Colton Dowell 27-yard pass from Keon Howard (Tyler Larco kick) (6 plays, 85 yards, 1:27)	WKU 28–14
3	12:51	WKU	Jerreth Sterns 7-yard pass from Bailey Zappe (Brayden Narveson kick) (5 plays, 53 yards, 2:09)	WKU 35–14
3	11:10	WKU	Joshua Simon 45-yard pass from Bailey Zappe (Brayden Narveson kick) (2 plays, 47 yards, 0:48)	WKU 42–14
3	03:02	WKU	Brayden Narveson 30-yard field goal (12 plays, 68 yards, 5:06)	WKU 45–14
4	14:17	WKU	Joshua Simon 3-yard pass from Bailey Zappe (Brayden Narveson kick) (4 plays, 57 yards, 2:01)	WKU 52–14
4	07:22	UTM	Keon Howard 9-yard rush (Tyler Larco kick) (14 plays, 75 yards, 6:54)	WKU 52–21
4	05:36	WKU	Craig Burt Jr. 54-yard pass from Carson Baker (Brayden Narveson kick) (3 plays, 65 yards, 1:41)	WKU 59–21

Statistics	UT Martin	Western Kentucky
First downs	22	25
Total yards	396	587
Rushing yards	201	109
Passing yards	195	478
Turnovers	2	1
Time of possession	33:30	26:30

Team	Category	Player	Statistics
UT Martin	Passing	Keon Howard	20/43, 195 yards, 1 TD, 1 INT
UT Martin	Rushing	Peyton Logan	7 carries, 75 yards
UT Martin	Receiving	Colton Dowell	6 receptions, 102 yards, 1 TD
Western Kentucky	Passing	Bailey Zappe	28/35, 424 yards, 7 TDs, 1 INT
Western Kentucky	Rushing	Kye Robichaux	9 carries, 44 yards
Western Kentucky	Receiving	Jerreth Sterns	7 receptions, 107 yards, 2 TDs

=== At Army ===
Western Kentucky at Army

Team	1	2	3	4	Total
Hilltoppers	0	14	0	21	35
• Black Knights	0	21	7	10	38

- Date: September 11, 2021
- Location: Michie Stadium
  West Point, NY
- Game start: 10:30 a.m. CDT
- Elapsed time: 3 hours and 19 minutes
- Game attendance: 25,989
- Game weather: 68 °F (20 °C) • Weather: Sunny • Wind: WSW 6 MPH
- Referee: Matt Overton
- TV announcers (CBS Sports Network): Jason Horowitz (play-by-play), Ross Tucker (analyst), and Tina Cervasio (sideline reporter)

Scoring summary
2	14:51	ARMY	Tyrell Robinson 24-yard rush (Cole Talley kick) (10 plays, 62 yards, 4:50)	ARMY 7–0
2	11:30	ARMY	Braheam Murphy 40-yard pass from Christian Anderson (Cole Talley kick) (4 plays, 53 yards, 1:55)	ARMY 14–0
2	10:40	WKU	Jerreth Sterns 72-yard pass from Bailey Zappe (Brayden Naverson kick) (3 plays, 75 yards, 0:50)	ARMY 14–7
2	02:07	ARMY	Jakobi Buchanan 1-yard rush (Cole Talley kick) (16 plays, 75 yards, 8:33)	ARMY 21–7
2	00:30	WKU	Bailey Zappe 10-yard rush (Brayden Naverson kick) (6 plays, 75 yards, 1:37)	ARMY 21–14
3	08:57	ARMY	Anthony Adkins 3-yard rush (Cole Talley kick) (10 plays, 75 yards, 6:03)	ARMY 28–14
4	10:31	ARMY	Jakobi Buchanan 13-yard rush (Cole Talley kick) (14 plays, 71 yards, 9:15)	ARMY 35–14
4	08:05	WKU	Mitchell Tinsley 21-yard pass from Bailey Zappe (Brayden Narveson kick) (8 plays, 75 yards, 2:26)	ARMY 35–21
4	04:58	WKU	Jerreth Sterns 14-yard pass from Bailey Zappe (Brayden Narveson kick) (6 plays, 63 yards, 1:23)	ARMY 35–28
4	01:52	ARMY	Cole Talley 31-yard field goal (7 plays, 30 yards, 3:05)	ARMY 38–28
4	00:22	WKU	Adam Cofield 2-yard rush (Brayden Narveson kick) (9 plays, 75 yards, 1:30)	ARMY 38–35

Statistics	Western Kentucky	Army
First downs	22	23
Total yards	477	416
Rushing yards	42	339
Passing yards	435	77
Turnovers	1	1
Time of possession	20:22	39:38

Team	Category	Player	Statistics
Western Kentucky	Passing	Bailey Zappe	28/40, 435 yards, 3 TDs, 1 INT
Western Kentucky	Rushing	Noah Whittington	8 carries, 33 yards
Western Kentucky	Receiving	Jerreth Sterns	9 receptions, 171 yards, 2 TDs
Army	Passing	Christian Anderson	5/6, 77 yards, 1 TD
Army	Rushing	Christian Anderson	22 carries, 119 yards
Army	Receiving	Braheam Murphy	1 reception, 40 yards, 1 TD

=== Indiana ===
Indiana at Western Kentucky

Team	1	2	3	4	Total
• Hoosiers	14	9	3	7	33
Hilltoppers	0	14	10	7	31

- Date: September 25, 2021
- Location: Houchens Industries–L. T. Smith Stadium
  Bowling Green, KY
- Game start: 7:02 p.m. CDT
- Elapsed time: 3 hours and 42 minutes
- Game attendance: 25,171
- Game weather: 70 °F (21 °C) • Weather: Clear • Wind: NNW 3 MPH
- Referee: Kevin Randall
- TV announcers (CBS Sports Network): Dave Ryan (play-by-play), Aaron Murray (analyst), and Jenny Dell (sideline reporter)

Scoring summary
1	10:15	IU	Stephen Carr 1-yard rush (Charles Campbell kick) (11 plays, 79 yards, 4:45)	IU 7–0
1	05:02	IU	Michael Penix Jr. 1-yard rush (Charles Campbell kick) (11 plays, 81 yards, 4:50)	IU 14–0
2	14:27	WKU	Adam Cofield 1-yard rush (Brayden Narveson kick) (15 plays, 77 yards, 5:29)	IU 14–7
2	09:49	IU	Charles Campbell 46-yard field goal (13 plays, 46 yards, 4:34)	IU 17–7
2	02:42	IU	Charles Campbell 37-yard field goal (13 plays, 56 yards, 4:55)	IU 20–7
2	00:55	WKU	Daewood Davis 25-yard pass from Bailey Zappe (Brayden Narveson kick) (7 plays, 72 yards, 1:42)	IU 20–14
2	00:00	IU	Charles Campbell 25-yard field goal (8 plays, 68 yards, 0:55)	IU 23–14
3	13:13	WKU	Dalvin Smith 13-yard pass from Bailey Zappe (Brayden Narveson kick) (5 plays, 76 yards, 1:40)	IU 23–21
3	09:10	IU	Charles Campbell 48-yard field goal (9 plays, 44 yards, 4:03)	IU 26–21
3	05:53	WKU	Brayden Narveson 34-yard field goal (11 plays, 59 yards, 3:17)	IU 26–24
4	04:27	IU	Stephen Carr 1-yard rush (Charles Campbell kick) (14 plays, 86 yards, 6:19)	IU 33–24
4	02:43	WKU	Malachi Corley 19-yard pass from Bailey Zappe (Brayden Narveson kick) (8 plays, 75 yards, 1:44)	IU 33–31

Statistics	Indiana	Western Kentucky
First downs	35	24
Total yards	507	458
Rushing yards	134	93
Passing yards	373	365
Turnovers	0	0
Time of possession	38:34	21:26

Team	Category	Player	Statistics
Indiana	Passing	Michael Penix Jr.	35/53, 373 yards
Indiana	Rushing	Stephen Carr	25 carries, 109 yards, 2 TDs
Indiana	Receiving	Peyton Hendershot	7 receptions, 100 yards
Western Kentucky	Passing	Bailey Zappe	31/44, 365 yards, 3 TDs
Western Kentucky	Rushing	Noah Whittington	6 carries, 41 yards
Western Kentucky	Receiving	Jerreth Sterns	7 receptions, 82 yards

=== At Michigan State ===
Western Kentucky at Michigan State

Team	1	2	3	4	Total
Hilltoppers	10	6	0	15	31
• No. 17 Spartans	21	21	3	3	48

- Date: October 2, 2021
- Location: Spartan Stadium
  East Lansing, MI
- Game start: 6:40 p.m. CDT
- Elapsed time: 3 hours and 59 minutes
- Game attendance: 70,075
- Game weather: 66 °F (19 °C) • Weather: Cloudy • Wind: S 6 MPH
- Referee: Mark Kluczynski
- TV announcers (Big Ten Network): Joe Beninati (play-by-play), Jeremy Leman (analyst), and Michelle McMahon (sideline reporter)

Scoring summary
1	13:32	MSU	Jayden Reed 88-yard punt returned (Matt Coghlin kick) (3 plays, 2 yards, 1:28)	MSU 7–0
1	08:26	MSU	Kenneth Walker III 5-yard rush (Matt Coghlin kick) (7 plays, 80 yards, 3:59)	MSU 14–0
1	05:04	WKU	Brayden Narveson 37-yard field goal (11 plays, 56 yards, 3:22)	MSU 14–3
1	03:54	MSU	Jayden Reed 46-yard pass from Payton Thorne (Matt Coghlin kick) (4 plays, 75 yards, 1:10)	MSU 21–3
1	02:57	WKU	Joey Beljan 4-yard pass from Bailey Zappe (Brayden Narveson kick) (3 plays, 65 yards, 0:57)	MSU 21–10
2	11:42	WKU	Brayden Narveson 29-yard field goal (13 plays, 61 yards, 4:53)	MSU 21–13
2	09:10	MSU	Kenneth Walker III 5-yard rush (Matt Coghlin kick) (6 plays, 68 yards, 2:27)	MSU 28–13
2	06:51	WKU	Brayden Narveson 35-yard field goal (8 plays, 58 yards, 2:19)	MSU 28–16
2	02:39	MSU	Kenneth Walker III 3-yard rush (Matt Coghlin kick) (9 plays, 66 yards, 4:06)	MSU 35–16
2	00:41	MSU	Payton Thorne 12-yard rush (Matt Coghlin kick) (6 plays, 31 yards, 0:53)	MSU 42–16
3	00:43	MSU	Matt Coghlin 21-yard field goal (14 plays, 96 yards, 5:49)	MSU 45–16
4	13:13	WKU	Jerreth Sterns 28-yard pass from Bailey Zappe (Bailey Zappe two-point conversion pass to Mitchell Tinsley) (9 plays, 75 yards, 2:30)	MSU 45–24
4	08:24	WKU	Joey Beljan 1-yard pass from Bailey Zappe (Brayden Narveson kick) (7 plays, 55 yards, 2:28)	MSU 45–31
4	04:46	MSU	Matt Coghlin 20-yard field goal (12 plays, 72 yards, 3:38)	MSU 48–31

Statistics	Western Kentucky	Michigan State
First downs	31	26
Total yards	560	519
Rushing yards	72	192
Passing yards	488	327
Turnovers	1	0
Time of possession	29:35	30:25

Team	Category	Player	Statistics
Western Kentucky	Passing	Bailey Zappe	46/64, 488 yards, 3 TDs
Western Kentucky	Rushing	Noah Whittington	7 carries, 37 yards
Western Kentucky	Receiving	Jerreth Sterns	17 receptions, 186 yards, 1 TD
Michigan State	Passing	Payton Thorne	20/30, 327 yards, 1 TD
Michigan State	Rushing	Kenneth Walker III	24 carries, 126 yards, 3 TDs
Michigan State	Receiving	Jalen Nailor	8 receptions, 128 yards

=== UTSA ===
UTSA at Western Kentucky

Team	1	2	3	4	Total
• Roadrunners	14	14	14	10	52
Hilltoppers	10	14	13	9	46

- Date: October 9, 2021
- Location: Houchens Industries–L. T. Smith Stadium
  Bowling Green, KY
- Game start: 6:06 p.m. CDT
- Elapsed time: 3 hours and 39 minutes
- Game attendance: 15,243
- Game weather: 82 °F (28 °C) • Weather: Sunny and Clear • Wind: 5-10 MPH
- Referee: Kevin Randall
- TV announcers (Stadium): Chris Vosters (play-by-play) and Sherdrick Bonner (analyst)

Scoring summary
1	14:13	UTSA	De'Corian Clark 30-yard pass from Frank Harris (Hunter Duplessis kick) (3 plays, 75 yards, 0:47)	UTSA 7–0
1	10:11	WKU	Brayden Narveson 34-yard field goal (8 plays, 54 yards, 3:56)	UTSA 7–3
1	05:03	UTSA	Tykee Ogle-Kellogg 15-yard pass from Frank Harris (Hunter Duplessis kick) (14 plays, 75 yards, 5:08)	UTSA 14–3
1	00:49	WKU	Jerreth Sterns 3-yard pass from Bailey Zappe (Brayden Narveson kick) (12 plays, 58 yards, 4:04)	UTSA 14–10
2	11:22	WKU	Adam Cofield 10-yard rush (Brayden Narveson kick) (8 plays, 74 yards, 3:26)	WKU 17–14
2	08:25	UTSA	Frank Harris 23-yard pass from Joshua Cephus (Hunter Duplessis kick) (8 plays, 75 yards, 2:57)	UTSA 21–17
2	04:47	WKU	Dalvin Smith 33-yard pass from Bailey Zappe (Brayden Narveson kick) (9 plays, 82 yards, 3:32)	WKU 24–21
2	00:40	UTSA	Oscar Cardenas 11-yard pass from Frank Harris (Hunter Duplessis kick) (3 plays, 32 yards, 0:32)	UTSA 28–24
3	12:46	WKU	Malachi Corley 24-yard pass from Bailey Zappe (Brayden Narveson kick) (3 plays, 24 yards, 0:52)	WKU 31–28
3	10:38	UTSA	De'Corian Clark 18-yard pass from Frank Harris (Hunter Duplessis kick) (6 plays, 75 yards, 2:08)	UTSA 35–31
3	06:06	UTSA	Joshua Cephus 3-yard pass from Frank Harris (Hunter Duplessis kick) (7 plays, 57 yards, 3:55)	UTSA 42–31
3	00:50	WKU	Mitchell Tinsley 40-yard pass from Bailey Zappe (two-point rush conversion attempt failed) (3 plays, 95 yards, 0:33)	UTSA 42–37
4	10:01	UTSA	Hunter Duplessis 35-yard field goal (10 plays, 57 yards, 5:49)	UTSA 45–37
4	08:04	WKU	Jerreth Sterns 20-yard pass from Bailey Zappe (two-point pass conversion attempt failed) (7 plays, 75 yards, 1:57)	UTSA 45–43
4	06:39	UTSA	De'Corian Clark 43-yard pass from Frank Harris (Hunter Duplessis kick) (4 plays, 75 yards, 1:25)	UTSA 52–43
4	04:22	WKU	Brayden Narveson 27-yard field goal (10 plays, 66 yards, 2:17)	UTSA 52–46

Statistics	UTSA	Western Kentucky
First downs	32	35
Total yards	564	670
Rushing yards	192	147
Passing yards	372	523
Turnovers	2	2
Time of possession	29:56	30:04

Team	Category	Player	Statistics
UTSA	Passing	Frank Harris	28/38, 349 yards, 6 TDs, 1 INT
UTSA	Rushing	Sincere McCormick	23 carries, 120 yards
UTSA	Receiving	De'Corian Clark	7 receptions, 160 yards, 3 TDs
Western Kentucky	Passing	Bailey Zappe	38/60, 523 yards, 5 TDs, 1 INT
Western Kentucky	Rushing	Adam Cofield	9 carries, 65 yards, 1 TD
Western Kentucky	Receiving	Jerreth Sterns	16 receptions, 195 yards, 2 TDs

=== At Old Dominion ===
Western Kentucky at Old Dominion

Team	1	2	3	4	Total
• Hilltoppers	14	16	3	10	43
Monarchs	0	3	3	14	20

- Date: October 16, 2021
- Location: S.B. Ballard Stadium
  Norfolk, VA
- Game start: 2:35 p.m. CDT
- Elapsed time: 3 hours and 20 minutes
- Game attendance: 16,418
- Game weather: 82 °F (28 °C) • Weather: Sunny
- Referee: Kevin Vicknair
- Television network: ESPN3

Scoring summary
1	09:16	WKU	Malachi Corley 26-yard pass from Bailey Zappe (Brayden Narveson kick) (8 plays, 68 yards, 3:42)	WKU 7–0
1	04:24	WKU	Dakota Thomas 9-yard pass from Bailey Zappe (Brayden Narveson kick) (12 plays, 81 yards, 3:30)	WKU 14–0
2	05:23	WKU	Daewood Davis 15-yard pass from Bailey Zappe (Brayden Narveson kick) (3 plays, 41 yards, 1:02)	WKU 21–0
2	02:23	ODU	Nick Rice 44-yard field goal (10 plays, 48 yards, 3:00)	WKU 21–3
2	01:48	WKU	Jerreth Sterns 74-yard pass from Bailey Zappe (Brayden Narveson kick) (3 plays, 75 yards, 0:35)	WKU 27–3
2	00:00	WKU	Brayden Narveson 20-yard field goal (8 plays, 45 yards, 1:16)	WKU 30–3
3	10:37	ODU	Nick Rice 38-yard field goal (11 plays, 54 yards, 4:23)	WKU 30–6
3	03:43	WKU	Brayden Narveson 31-yard field goal (4 plays, -9 yards, 1:30)	WKU 33–6
4	14:55	ODU	Elijah Davis 24-yard rush (Nick Rice kick) (8 plays, 79 yards, 3:45)	WKU 33–13
4	10:17	ODU	Blake Watson 7-yard rush (Nick Rice kick) (8 plays, 78 yards, 3:02)	WKU 33–20
4	05:41	WKU	Brayden Narveson 41-yard field goal (13 plays, 42 yards, 4:31)	WKU 36–20
4	03:51	WKU	Dakota Thomas 17-yard pass from Bailey Zappe (Brayden Narveson kick) (2 plays, 23 yards, 0:38)	WKU 43–20

Statistics	Western Kentucky	Old Dominion
First downs	29	23
Total yards	518	446
Rushing yards	121	119
Passing yards	397	327
Turnovers	1	3
Time of possession	30:39	29:21

Team	Category	Player	Statistics
Western Kentucky	Passing	Bailey Zappe	36/54, 397 yards, 5 TDs, 1 INT
Western Kentucky	Rushing	Adam Cofield	10 carries, 67 yards
Western Kentucky	Receiving	Jerreth Sterns	13 receptions, 221 yards, 1 TD
Old Dominion	Passing	Hayden Wolff	26/41, 327 yards, 2 INTs
Old Dominion	Rushing	Blake Watson	22 carries, 104 yards, 1 TD
Old Dominion	Receiving	Ali Jennings III	13 receptions, 172 yards

=== At FIU ===
Western Kentucky at Florida International

Team	1	2	3	4	Total
• Hilltoppers	0	17	7	10	34
Panthers	6	6	0	7	19

- Date: October 23, 2021
- Location: Riccardo Silva Stadium
  University Park, FL
- Game start: 7:28 p.m. CDT
- Elapsed time: 2 hours and 24 minutes
- Game attendance: 0
- Game weather: 80 °F (27 °C) • Weather: Sunny
- Referee: Patrick Foy
- TV announcers (ESPN+): A. J. Ricketts (play–by–play) and Cam Lynch (analyst)

Scoring summary
1	10:22	FIU	Max Bortenschlager 1-yard rush (Chase Gabriel PAT blocked) (12 plays, 75 yards, 4:38)	FIU 6–0
2	07:13	WKU	Adam Cofield 8-yard rush (Brayden Narveson kick) (8 plays, 80 yards, 2:52)	WKU 7–6
2	07:04	FIU	Randall St. Felix 75-yard pass from Max Bortenschlager (two-point pass conversion attempt failed) (1 play, 75 yards, 0:09)	FIU 12–7
2	01:22	WKU	Brayden Narveson 23-yard field goal (13 plays, 70 yards, 5:42)	FIU 12–10
2	00:15	WKU	Mitchell Tinsley 32-yard pass from Bailey Zappe (Brayden Narveson kick) (5 plays, 80 yards, 0:34)	WKU 17–12
3	11:35	WKU	Jerreth Sterns 20-yard pass from Bailey Zappe (Brayden Narveson kick) (8 plays, 75 yards, 3:25)	WKU 24–12
4	11:08	WKU	Jerreth Sterns 1-yard pass from Bailey Zappe (Brayden Narveson kick) (9 plays, 63 yards, 3:52)	WKU 31–12
4	04:08	WKU	Brayden Narveson 26-yard field goal (13 plays, 82 yards, 5:20)	WKU 34–12
4	01:39	FIU	Shaun Peterson Jr. 3-yard rush (Chase Gabriel kick) (9 plays, 75 yards, 2:29)	WKU 34–19

Statistics	Western Kentucky	FIU
First downs	31	18
Total yards	530	290
Rushing yards	148	28
Passing yards	382	262
Turnovers	1	0
Time of possession	33:15	26:45

Team	Category	Player	Statistics
Western Kentucky	Passing	Bailey Zappe	39/49, 382 yards, 3 TDs
Western Kentucky	Rushing	Adam Cofield	15 carries, 74 yards, 1 TD
Western Kentucky	Receiving	Jerreth Sterns	14 receptions, 115 yards, 2 TDs
FIU	Passing	Max Bortenschlager	15/32, 192 yards, 1 TD
FIU	Rushing	D'Vonte Price	15 carries, 86 yards
FIU	Receiving	Randall St. Felix	5 receptions, 104 yards, 1 TD

=== Charlotte ===
Charlotte at Western Kentucky

Team	1	2	3	4	Total
49ers	3	10	0	0	13
• Hilltoppers	14	14	7	10	45

- Date: October 30, 2021
- Location: Houchens Industries–L. T. Smith Stadium
  Bowling Green, KY
- Game start: 3:05 p.m. CDT
- Elapsed time: 3 hours and 11 minutes
- Game attendance: 16,763
- Game weather: 55 °F (13 °C) • Weather: Wet and Cloudy
- Referee: Scott Hardin
- TV announcers (ESPN+): Nate Gatter (play–by–play) and Bob Belvin (analyst)

Scoring summary
1	11:44	WKU	Daewood Davis 11-yard pass from Bailey Zappe (Brayden Narveson kick) (7 plays, 47 yards, 2:19)	WKU 7–0
1	06:39	CLT	Jonathan Cruz 37-yard field goal (11 plays, 55 yards, 5:05)	WKU 7–3
1	01:21	WKU	Bailey Zappe 2-yard rush (Brayden Narveson kick) (4 plays, 73 yards, 1:29)	WKU 14–3
2	13:09	WKU	Mitchell Tinsley 13-yard pass from Bailey Zappe (Brayden Narveson kick) (6 plays, 50 yards, 2:20)	WKU 21–3
2	09:40	CLT	James Foster 1-yard rush (Jonathan Cruz kick) (7 plays, 75 yards, 3:29)	WKU 21–10
2	03:06	CLT	Jonathan Cruz 56-yard field goal (5 plays, 37 yards, 2:10)	WKU 21–13
2	01:27	WKU	Jerreth Sterns 21-yard pass from Bailey Zappe (Brayden Narveson kick) (5 plays, 75 yards, 1:39)	WKU 28–13
3	02:04	WKU	Dalvin Smith 9-yard pass from Bailey Zappe (Brayden Narveson kick) (8 plays, 69 yards, 2:46)	WKU 35–13
4	12:28	WKU	Brayden Narveson 35-yard field goal (8 plays, 17 yards, 2:52)	WKU 38–13
4	05:09	WKU	Noah Whittington 1-yard rush (Brayden Narveson kick) (6 plays, 60 yards, 3:09)	WKU 45–13

Statistics	Charlotte	Western Kentucky
First downs	17	29
Total yards	319	469
Rushing yards	190	76
Passing yards	129	393
Turnovers	2	2
Time of possession	33:44	26:16

Team	Category	Player	Statistics
Charlotte	Passing	James Foster	12/24, 129 yards, 1 INT
Charlotte	Rushing	Calvin Camp	7 carries, 60 yards
Charlotte	Receiving	Shadrick Byrd	1 reception, 53 yards
Western Kentucky	Passing	Bailey Zappe	33/45, 393 yards, 4 TDs, 2 INTs
Western Kentucky	Rushing	Noah Whittington	10 carries, 66 yards, 1 TD
Western Kentucky	Receiving	Jerreth Sterns	10 receptions, 89 yards, 1 TD

=== Middle Tennessee ===
Middle Tennessee at Western Kentucky

Team	1	2	3	4	Total
Blue Raiders	7	7	0	7	21
• Hilltoppers	21	10	17	0	48

- Date: November 6, 2021
- Location: Houchens Industries–L. T. Smith Stadium
  Bowling Green, KY
- Game start: 2:36 p.m. CDT
- Elapsed time: 3 hours and 21 minutes
- Game attendance: 15,022
- Game weather: 59 °F (15 °C) • Weather: Sunny and Clear
- Referee: Joe Lehring
- TV announcers (Stadium): Chris Hassel (play–by–play) and Max Starks (analyst)

Scoring summary
1	11:49	MTSU	DJ England-Chisolm 45-yard pass from Nick Vattiato (Zeke Rankin kick) (8 plays, 75 yards, 3:11)	MTSU 7–0
1	10:21	WKU	Daewood Davis 17-yard pass from Bailey Zappe (Brayden Narveson kick) (7 plays, 68 yards, 1:22)	TIE 7–7
1	06:09	WKU	Mitchell Tinsley 5-yard pass from Bailey Zappe (Brayden Narveson kick) (2 plays, 19 yards, 0:36)	WKU 14–7
1	02:07	WKU	Beanie Bishop 43-yard interception returned (Brayden Narveson kick) (3 plays, -1 yards, 1:34)	WKU 21–7
2	09:08	MTSU	Yusuf Ali 36-yard pass from Nick Vattiato (Zeke Rankin kick) (5 plays, 52 yards, 1:38)	WKU 21–14
2	05:24	WKU	Brayden Narveson 35-yard field goal (9 plays, 54 yards, 3:38)	WKU 24–14
2	03:35	WKU	Mitchell Tinsley 10-yard pass from Bailey Zappe (Brayden Narveson kick) (2 plays, 10 yards, 0:09)	WKU 31–14
3	11:21	WKU	Daewood Davis 28-yard pass from Bailey Zappe (Brayden Narveson kick) (7 plays, 74 yards, 3:39)	WKU 38–14
3	09:18	WKU	Bailey Zappe 8-yard rush (Brayden Narveson kick) (4 plays, 33 yards, 1:16)	WKU 45–14
3	07:38	WKU	Brayden Narveson 43-yard field goal (4 plays, 4 yards, 0:57)	WKU 48–14
4	13:35	MTSU	Frank Peasant 5-yard rush (Zeke Rankin kick) (3 plays, 16 yards, 1:04)	WKU 48–21

Statistics	Middle Tennessee	Western Kentucky
First downs	19	19
Total yards	349	352
Rushing yards	123	71
Passing yards	226	281
Turnovers	7	0
Time of possession	33:02	26:58

Team	Category	Player	Statistics
Middle Tennessee	Passing	Nick Vattiato	24/41, 205 yards, 2 TDs, 5 INTs
Middle Tennessee	Rushing	Frank Peasant	18 carries, 78 yards, 1 TD
Middle Tennessee	Receiving	DJ England-Chisolm	3 receptions, 69 yards, 1 TD
Western Kentucky	Passing	Bailey Zappe	29/50, 281 yards, 4 TDs
Western Kentucky	Rushing	Noah Whittington	17 carries, 67 yards
Western Kentucky	Receiving	Jerreth Sterns	11 receptions, 110 yards

=== At Rice ===
Western Kentucky at Rice

Team	1	2	3	4	Total
• Hilltoppers	7	21	0	14	42
Owls	0	0	7	14	21

- Date: November 13, 2021
- Location: Rice Stadium
  Houston, TX
- Game start: 1:05 p.m. CST
- Elapsed time: 3 hours and 20 minutes
- Game attendance: 17,883
- Game weather: 67 °F (19 °C) • Weather: Sunny • Wind: NE 7 MPH
- Referee: Scott Hardin
- TV announcers (ESPN+): David Saltzman (play–by–play) and Taylor McHargue (analyst)

Scoring summary
1	02:56	WKU	Kye Robichaux 2-yard rush (Brayden Narveson kick) (7 plays, 97 yards, 3:00)	WKU 7–0
2	10:12	WKU	Kye Robichaux 13-yard pass from Bailey Zappe (Brayden Narveson kick) (5 plays, 39 yards, 2:18)	WKU 14–0
2	07:36	WKU	Mitchell Tinsley 65-yard pass from Bailey Zappe (Brayden Narveson kick) (2 plays, 70 yards, 0:34)	WKU 21–0
2	06:19	WKU	Dalvin Smith 7-yard pass from Bailey Zappe (Brayden Narveson kick) (2 plays, 34 yards, 0:32)	WKU 28–0
3	03:16	RICE	Cedric Patterson III 23-yard pass from Jake Constantine (Christian VanSickle kick) (8 plays, 80 yards, 3:44)	WKU 28–7
4	14:56	WKU	Mitchell Tinsley 9-yard pass from Bailey Zappe (Brayden Narveson kick) (10 plays, 77 yards, 3:15)	WKU 35–7
4	11:44	RICE	Khalan Griffin 7-yard rush (Christian VanSickle kick) (9 plays, 75 yards, 3:12)	WKU 35–14
4	08:18	WKU	Joey Beljan 5-yard pass from Bailey Zappe (Brayden Narveson kick) (2 plays, 23 yards, 0:35)	WKU 42–14
4	00:55	RICE	Juma Otoviano 2-yard rush (Christian VanSickle kick) (6 plays, 37 yards, 1:13)	WKU 42–21

Statistics	Western Kentucky	Rice
First downs	27	25
Total yards	587	504
Rushing yards	92	124
Passing yards	495	380
Turnovers	4	5
Time of possession	24:20	35:40

Team	Category	Player	Statistics
Western Kentucky	Passing	Bailey Zappe	34/42, 482 yards, 5 TDs, 1 INT
Western Kentucky	Rushing	Kye Robichaux	12 carries, 61 yards, 1 TD
Western Kentucky	Receiving	Mitchell Tinsley	10 receptions, 198 yards, 2 TDs
Rice	Passing	Jake Constantine	28/50, 380 yards, 1 TD, 4 INTs
Rice	Rushing	Ari Broussard	15 carries, 60 yards
Rice	Receiving	August Pitre III	9 receptions, 113 yards

=== Florida Atlantic ===
Florida Atlantic at Western Kentucky

Team	1	2	3	4	Total
Owls	3	7	7	0	17
• Hilltoppers	14	17	7	14	52

- Date: November 20, 2021
- Location: Houchens Industries–L. T. Smith Stadium
  Bowling Green, KY
- Game start: 11:06 a.m. CST
- Elapsed time: 3 hours and 27 minutes
- Game attendance: 10,477
- Game weather: 55 °F (13 °C) • Weather: Partly Cloudy
- Referee: Rodney Burnette
- TV announcers (Stadium): Noah Coslov (play–by–play) and Sherdrick Bonner (analyst)

Scoring summary
1	10:52	WKU	Jerreth Sterns 1-yard pass from Bailey Zappe (Brayden Narveson kick) (6 plays, 87 yards, 2:16)	WKU 7–0
1	05:41	FAU	Morgan Suarez 35-yard field goal (11 plays, 33 yards, 5:11)	WKU 7–3
1	04:13	WKU	Mitchell Tinsley 8-yard pass from Bailey Zappe (Brayden Narveson kick) (3 plays, 50 yards, 1:20)	WKU 14–3
2	13:34	WKU	Joey Beljan 3-yard pass from Bailey Zappe (Brayden Narveson kick) (9 plays, 79 yards, 3:52)	WKU 21–3
2	07:58	FAU	Teja Young 62-yard interception returned (Morgan Suarez kick) (6 plays, 43 yards, 2:50)	WKU 21–10
2	03:15	WKU	Malachi Corley 3-yard pass from Bailey Zappe (Brayden Narveson kick) (9 plays, 80 yards, 4:36)	WKU 28–10
2	01:35	WKU	Brayden Narveson 26-yard field goal (6 plays, 28 yards, 1:38)	WKU 31–10
3	05:34	FAU	Joey Mitchell 9-yard pass from N'Kosi Perry (Morgan Suarez kick) (9 plays, 62 yards, 3:36)	WKU 31–17
3	01:59	WKU	Mitchell Tinsley 27-yard pass from Bailey Zappe (Brayden Narveson kick) (5 plays, 61 yards, 1:57)	WKU 38–17
4	12:15	WKU	Joey Beljan 7-yard pass from Bailey Zappe (Brayden Narveson kick) (7 plays, 56 yards, 2:40)	WKU 45–17
4	04:16	WKU	Jakairi Moses 7-yard rush (Brayden Narveson kick) (10 plays, 83 yards, 5:32)	WKU 52–17

Statistics	Florida Atlantic	Western Kentucky
First downs	18	35
Total yards	301	608
Rushing yards	25	100
Passing yards	276	508
Turnovers	3	3
Time of possession	24:39	35:21

Team	Category	Player	Statistics
Florida Atlantic	Passing	N'Kosi Perry	19/28, 213 yards, 1 TD, 2 INTs
Florida Atlantic	Rushing	Johnny Ford	13 carries, 48 yards
Florida Atlantic	Receiving	Je'Quan Burton	7 receptions, 80 yards
Western Kentucky	Passing	Bailey Zappe	39/49, 470 yards, 6 TDs, 2 INTs
Western Kentucky	Rushing	Noah Whittington	9 carries, 46 yards
Western Kentucky	Receiving	Mitchell Tinsley	9 receptions, 164 yards, 2 TDs

=== At Marshall ===
Western Kentucky at Marshall

Team	1	2	3	4	Total
• Hilltoppers	0	6	23	24	53
Thundering Herd	7	7	0	7	21

- Date: November 27, 2021
- Location: Joan C. Edwards Stadium
  Huntington, WV
- Game start: 2:37 p.m. CST
- Elapsed time: 3 hours and 37 minutes
- Game attendance: 19,134
- Game weather: 55 °F (13 °C) • Weather: Sunny
- Referee: Jonathan Noli
- TV announcers (CBS Sports Network): Alex Del Barrio (play–by–play) and Sherdrick Bonner (analyst)

Scoring summary
1	07:01	MRSH	Grant Wells 1-yard rush (Shane Ciucci kick) (15 plays, 79 yards, 6:58)	MRSH 7–0
2	14:22	MRSH	Devin Miller 3-yard pass from Grant Wells (Shane Ciucci kick) (9 plays, 57 yards, 3:57)	MRSH 14–0
2	08:05	WKU	Brayden Narveson 41-yard field goal (6 plays, 25 yards, 1:56)	MRSH 14–3
2	02:48	WKU	Brayden Narveson 46-yard field goal (10 plays, 27 yards, 3:12)	MRSH 14–6
3	13:41	WKU	Daewood Davis 47-yard pass from Bailey Zappe (Brayden Narveson kick) (2 plays, 58 yards, 0:23)	MRSH 14–13
3	09:10	WKU	Malachi Corley 14-yard pass from Bailey Zappe (Brayden Narveson kick) (9 plays, 78 yards, 2:21)	WKU 20–14
3	07:28	WKU	Daewood Davis 50-yard pass from Bailey Zappe (two-point pass conversion attempt failed) (1 play, 50 yards, 0:09)	WKU 26–14
3	03:25	WKU	Brayden Narveson 53-yard field goal (10 plays, 37 yards, 3:30)	WKU 29–14
4	14:18	WKU	Dalvin Smith 8-yard pass from Bailey Zappe (Brayden Narveson kick) (9 plays, 78 yards, 3:30)	WKU 36–14
4	12:23	MRSH	Shadeed Ahmed 41-yard pass from Luke Zban (Shane Ciucci kick) (6 plays, 75 yards, 1:55)	WKU 36–21
4	12:16	WKU	A. J. Brathwaite 43-yard kickoff returned (Brayden Narveson kick) (9 plays, 31 yards, 3:46)	WKU 43–21
4	01:12	WKU	Brayden Narveson 39-yard field goal (11 plays, 21 yards, 7:18)	WKU 46–21
4	00:53	WKU	Davion Williams 45-yard interception returned (Brayden Narveson kick) (2 plays, 0 yards, 0:19)	WKU 53–21

Statistics	Western Kentucky	Marshall
First downs	25	20
Total yards	485	325
Rushing yards	157	126
Passing yards	328	199
Turnovers	0	2
Time of possession	30:34	29:26

Team	Category	Player	Statistics
Western Kentucky	Passing	Bailey Zappe	24/48, 328 yards, 4 TDs
Western Kentucky	Rushing	Noah Whittington	14 carries, 69 yards
Western Kentucky	Receiving	Daewood Davis	3 receptions, 105 yards, 2 TDs
Marshall	Passing	Luke Zban	16/25, 123 yards, 1 TD, 1 INT
Marshall	Rushing	Rasheen Ali	24 carries, 99 yards
Marshall	Receiving	Corey Gammage	7 receptions, 44 yards

=== At UTSA (C-USA Championship) ===
Western Kentucky at Texas–San Antonio

Team	1	2	3	4	Total
Hilltoppers	10	3	13	15	41
• Roadrunners	14	14	14	7	49

- Date: December 3, 2021
- Location: Alamodome
  San Antonio, TX
- Game start: 6:06 p.m. CST
- Elapsed time: 3 hours and 49 minutes
- Game attendance: 41,148
- Game weather: 72 °F (22 °C) • Weather: N/A (Indoors)
- Referee: Kevin Randall
- TV announcers (CBS Sports Network): Rich Waltz (play–by–play), Aaron Taylor (analyst), and Jenny Dell (sideline reporter)

Scoring summary
1	14:04	WKU	Mitchell Tinsley 60-yard pass from Bailey Zappe (Brayden Narveson kick) (5 plays, 78 yards, 0:56)	WKU 7–0
1	11:49	UTSA	Frank Harris 24-yard rush (Hunter Duplessis kick) (7 plays, 75 yards, 2:15)	TIE 7–7
1	10:07	WKU	Brayden Narveson 33-yard field goal (6 plays, 51 yards, 1:42)	WKU 10–7
1	04:59	UTSA	Sincere McCormick 2-yard rush (Hunter Duplessis kick) (14 plays, 75 yards, 5:08)	UTSA 14–10
2	14:57	WKU	Brayden Narveson 34-yard field goal (15 plays, 59 yards, 5:02)	UTSA 14–13
2	11:50	UTSA	Brenden Brady 6-yard rush (Hunter Duplessis kick) (9 plays, 75 yards, 3:07)	UTSA 21–13
2	09:10	UTSA	Sincere McCormick 65-yard rush (Hunter Duplessis kick) (1 play, 65 yards, 0:11)	UTSA 28–13
3	11:13	UTSA	Zakhari Franklin 14-yard pass from Frank Harris (Hunter Duplessis kick) (2 plays, 14 yards, 0:45)	UTSA 35–13
3	10:16	UTSA	Sincere McCormick 17-yard rush (Hunter Duplessis kick) (1 play, 17 yards, 0:08)	UTSA 42–13
3	08:17	WKU	Mitchell Tinsley 12-yard pass from Bailey Zappe (Brayden Narveson kick) (8 plays, 66 yards, 1:59)	UTSA 42–20
3	03:01	WKU	Jerreth Sterns 13-yard pass from Bailey Zappe (two-point pass conversion attempt failed) (7 plays, 53 yards, 2:17)	UTSA 42–26
4	11:01	WKU	Kye Robichaux 1-yard rush (Bailey Zappe two-point pass conversion to Jerreth Sterns) (5 plays, 71 yards, 1:10)	UTSA 42–34
4	06:18	UTSA	De'Corian Clark 28-yard pass from Frank Harris (Hunter Duplessis kick) (10 plays, 75 yards, 4:43)	UTSA 49–34
4	03:58	WKU	Jerreth Sterns 34-yard pass from Bailey Zappe (Brayden Narveson kick) (9 plays, 72 yards, 2:20)	UTSA 49–41

Statistics	Western Kentucky	UTSA
First downs	26	28
Total yards	568	556
Rushing yards	-9	304
Passing yards	577	252
Turnovers	3	0
Time of possession	23:16	36:44

Team	Category	Player	Statistics
Western Kentucky	Passing	Bailey Zappe	36/59, 577 yards, 4 TDs, 2 INTs
Western Kentucky	Rushing	Noah Whittington	4 carries, 15 yards
Western Kentucky	Receiving	Jerreth Sterns	10 receptions, 179 yards, 2 TDs
UTSA	Passing	Frank Harris	19/28, 218 yards, 2 TDs
UTSA	Rushing	Sincere McCormick	36 carries, 204 yards, 3 TDs
UTSA	Receiving	Zakhari Franklin	6 receptions, 67 yards, 1 TD

=== Vs. Appalachian State (Boca Raton Bowl) ===
Western Kentucky vs. Appalachian State

Team	1	2	3	4	Total
• Hilltoppers	14	17	21	7	59
Mountaineers	14	10	7	7	38

- Date: December 18, 2021
- Location: FAU Stadium
  Boca Raton, FL
- Game start: 10:00 a.m. CST
- Elapsed time: 3 hours and 42 minutes
- Game attendance: 15,429
- Game weather: 81 °F (27 °C) • Weather: Cloudy • Wind: SE 17 MPH
- Referee: Steve Baron
- TV announcers (ESPN): Clay Matvick (play–by–play), Rocky Boiman (analyst), and Tiffany Blackmon (sideline reporter)

Scoring summary
1	13:14	WKU	Jerreth Sterns 1-yard pass from Bailey Zappe (Brayden Narveson kick) (8 plays, 74 yards, 1:46)	WKU 7–0
1	3:25	ASU	Malik Williams 36-yard pass from Chase Brice (Chandler Staton kick) (6 plays, 63 yards, 2:58)	Tie 7–7
1	3:11	WKU	Mitchell Tinsley 75-yard pass from Bailey Zappe (Brayden Narveson kick) (1 play, 75 yards, 00:14)	WKU 14–7
1	1:11	ASU	Jalen Virgil 60-yard pass from Chase Brice (Chandler Staton kick) (5 plays, 76 yards, 2:00)	Tie 14–14
2	11:48	WKU	Brayden Narveson 24-yard field goal (7 plays, 64 yards, 1:21)	WKU 17–14
2	8:57	ASU	Dashaun Davis 33-yard pass from Chase Brice (Chandler Staton kick) (5 plays, 61 yards, 2:51)	ASU 21–17
2	6:54	WKU	Joey Beljan 5-yard pass from Bailey Zappe (Brayden Narveson kick) (8 plays, 75 yards, 2:03)	WKU 24–21
2	2:55	ASU	Chandler Staton 28-yard field goal (8 plays, 64 yards, 3:59)	Tie 24–24
2	00:29	WKU	Jerreth Sterns 10-yard pass from Bailey Zappe (Brayden Narveson kick) (8 plays, 78 yards, 2:26)	WKU 31–24
3	12:49	WKU	Noah Wittington 86-yard run (Brayden Narveson kick) (1 play, 86 yards, 00:12)	WKU 38–24
3	5:56	WKU	Mitchell Tinsley 2-yard pass from Bailey Zappe (Brayden Narveson kick) (11 plays, 73 yards, 4:38)	WKU 45–24
3	5:38	ASU	Christian Wells 62-yard pass from Chase Brice (Chandler Staton kick) (1 play, 62 yards, 00:18)	WKU 45–31
3	2:42	WKU	Jerreth Sterns 37-yard pass from Bailey Zappe (Brayden Narveson kick) (6 plays, 75 yards, 2:56)	WKU 52–31
4	9:40	WKU	Kye Robichaux 2-yard run (Brayden Narveson kick) (2 plays, 2 yards, 00:09)	WKU 59–31
4	1:55	ASU	Anderson Castle 9-yard run (Chandler Staton kick) (7 plays, 69 yards, 2:17)	WKU 59–38

Statistics	Western Kentucky	Appalachian State
First downs	24	27
Total yards	609	637
Rushing yards	251	215
Passing yards	358	422
Turnovers	4	1
Time of possession	31:12	28:48

Team	Category	Player	Statistics
Western Kentucky	Passing	Bailey Zappe	33/47, 422 yards, 6 TD
Western Kentucky	Rushing	Noah Wittington	7 carries, 150 yards, 1 TD
Western Kentucky	Receiving	Jerreth Sterns	13 receptions, 184 yards, 3 TD
Appalachian State	Passing	Chase Brice	15/23, 317 yards, 4 TD, INT
Appalachian State	Rushing	Camerun Peoples	13 carries, 101 yards
Appalachian State	Receiving	Christian Wells	4 receptions, 86 yards, 1 TD
