= Bailey Zappe =

American football player (born 1999)

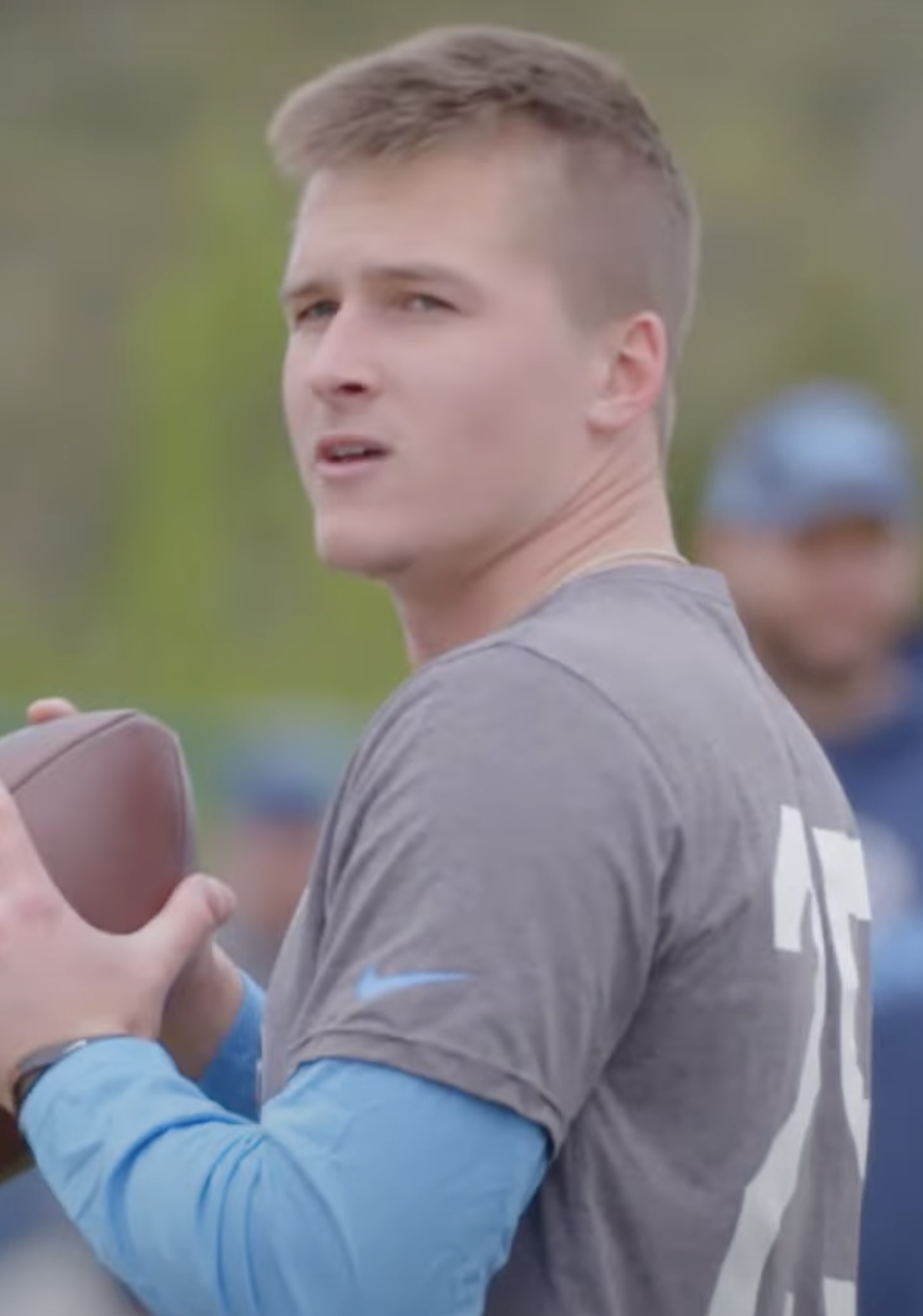
- Zappe in 2022

Profile
- Position: Quarterback

Personal information
- Born: April 26, 1999 (age 27); Victoria, Texas, U.S.
- Listed height: 6 ft 1 in (1.85 m)
- Listed weight: 215 lb (98 kg)

Career information
- High school: Victoria East
- College: Houston Christian (2017–2020); Western Kentucky (2021)
- NFL draft: 2022: 4th round, 137th overall pick

Career history
- New England Patriots (2022–2023); Kansas City Chiefs (2024)*; Cleveland Browns (2024); Kansas City Chiefs (2025)*; Cleveland Browns (2025); New York Jets (2026)*
- * Offseason or practice squad member only

Awards and highlights
- NCAA passing yards leader (2021); NCAA passing touchdowns leader (2021); C-USA Most Valuable Player (2021); Earl Campbell Tyler Rose Award (2021); NCAA (FBS) records: Most passing yards in a season (5,967); Most passing touchdowns in a season (62)

Career NFL statistics as of 2025
- Passing attempts: 335
- Passing completions: 208
- Completion percentage: 62.1%
- TD–INT: 12–14
- Passing yards: 2,223
- Passer rating: 76.0
- Stats at Pro Football Reference

Bailey Michael Zappe (/ˈzæpi/, ZAP-ee) (born April 26, 1999) is an American professional football quarterback. He played his first three seasons of college football for the Houston Baptist Huskies and used his last year of eligibility with the Western Kentucky Hilltoppers, setting the FBS season records for passing yards and passing touchdowns. Zappe was selected in the fourth round of the 2022 NFL draft by the New England Patriots, where he spent his first two seasons alternating as a backup and starter. He spent his next two seasons as a backup with the Cleveland Browns.

== Early life ==
Zappe grew up in Victoria, Texas, and attended Victoria East High School. As a senior, he passed for 3,770 yards and 37 touchdowns, while rushing for 633 yards and scoring 15 touchdowns. Zappe was not heavily recruited and committed to play college football at Houston Baptist University, which was his only scholarship offer. Victoria East retired Zappe's No. 4 jersey in 2023.

== College career ==
=== Houston Baptist ===
Zappe started nine games in his first year for the Huskies at Houston Baptist, passing for 1,548 yards with five touchdowns and 10 interceptions while rushing for two more touchdowns. As a redshirt sophomore, he completed 357 of 560 passes for 3,811 yards with 35 touchdowns and 15 interceptions. As a redshirt junior, he passed for 1,833 yards and 15 touchdowns against one interception in four games in a shortened season after the Southland Conference fall football season was canceled due to the COVID-19 pandemic. Zappe entered the transfer portal after the season.

=== Western Kentucky ===
Zappe committed to transfer to Western Kentucky University, following former Houston Baptist offensive coordinator Zach Kittley. Zappe's top wide receiver at Houston Baptist, Jerreth Sterns, also transferred to Western Kentucky. Zappe was named the Hilltoppers' starting quarterback going into the 2021 season. In his first start for Western Kentucky, he passed for 424 yards and seven touchdowns in a 59–21 win over Tennessee-Martin.

During the 2021 regular season, Zappe led the Football Bowl Subdivision (FBS) passing for 5,545 yards and throwing for 56 touchdowns. Before the 2021 Boca Raton Bowl, he had thrown for nearly 1,100 yards more than the second-ranked FBS quarterback (Will Rogers of Mississippi State), and was within striking distance of the FBS records for passing yardage and touchdowns, set by B. J. Symons of Texas Tech in 2003 and Joe Burrow of LSU in 2019, respectively. In the 2021 Boca Raton Bowl against the Appalachian State Mountaineers, he broke both records, finishing the season with 5,967 passing yards and 62 touchdowns. (Note: Blaine Hawkins of Central (IA) holds the NCAA record at 63.)

=== Statistics ===
Legend
| | FCS/FBS record |
| | Led the Southland/C-USA |
| **Bold** | Career best |
| Italics | Led FCS/FBS |

| Season | Team | Games | | | Passing | | | | | | | | Rushing | | | |
| Season | Team | GP | GS | Record | Cmp | Att | Pct | Yds | Y/A | TD | Int | Rtg | Att | Yds | Avg | TD |
|---|---|---|---|---|---|---|---|---|---|---|---|---|---|---|---|---|
| 2017 | Houston Baptist | 10 | 9 | 1–8 | 150 | 266 | 56.4 | 1,548 | 5.8 | 5 | 10 | 103.9 | 81 | 50 | 0.6 | 2 |
| 2018 | Houston Baptist | 11 | 11 | 1–10 | 252 | 436 | 57.8 | 2,822 | 6.4 | 23 | 13 | 123.6 | **118** | **179** | **1.5** | 1 |
| 2019 | Houston Baptist | 12 | 12 | 5–7 | 357 | 560 | 63.8 | 3,811 | 6.8 | 35 | 15 | 136.2 | 53 | 0 | 0.0 | 0 |
| 2020 | Houston Baptist | 4 | 4 | 1–3 | 141 | 215 | 65.6 | 1,833 | 8.5 | 15 | **1** | 159.3 | 19 | 14 | 0.7 | 0 |
| 2021 | Western Kentucky | 14 | 14 | 9–5 | **476** | **687** | **69.3** | **5,967** | 8.7 | **62** | 11 | **167.5** | 51 | 17 | 0.3 | **3** |
| Total | | 51 | 50 | 17–33 | 1,376 | 2,164 | 63.6 | 15,981 | 7.4 | 140 | 50 | 138.1 | 322 | 260 | 0.8 | 6 |

== Professional career ==
Pre-draft measurables
| Height | Weight | Arm length | Hand span | Wingspan | 40-yard dash | 10-yard split | 20-yard split | 20-yard shuttle | Three-cone drill | Vertical jump | Broad jump | Wonderlic |
|---|---|---|---|---|---|---|---|---|---|---|---|---|
| 6 ft 0 1/2 in (1.84 m) | 215 lb (98 kg) | 31 3/8 in (0.80 m) | 9 3/4 in (0.25 m) | 6 ft 2 3/4 in (1.90 m) | 4.88 s | 1.67 s | 2.74 s | 4.40 s | 7.19 s | 30.0 in (0.76 m) | 9 ft 1 in (2.77 m) | 35 |
All values from NFL Combine

=== New England Patriots ===
==== 2022 ====
The New England Patriots selected Zappe in the fourth round of the 2022 NFL draft with the 137th overall pick. He was named the third-string quarterback for the 2022 season behind starter Mac Jones and second-string backup Brian Hoyer.

When an injury rendered Jones inactive for Week 4 against the Green Bay Packers, Zappe was promoted to the second option behind Hoyer, but made his NFL debut the same game after Hoyer was injured on his first drive. He completed 10 of 15 passes for 99 yards and a touchdown in the narrow 27–24 loss in overtime. Zappe was also the first rookie in the league to throw a touchdown pass that season. He made his starting debut the following week against the Detroit Lions, completing 17 of 21 passes for 188 yards, a touchdown, and an interception in the 29–0 shutout victory. After a Week 6 victory over the Cleveland Browns, where he threw for 309 yards and two touchdowns, Zappe became the first rookie quarterback in the Super Bowl era to win his first two starts and have a passer rating of at least 100 in each start.

While Hoyer was on injured reserve, Jones returned and Zappe was named the backup in the Week 7 Monday Night Football matchup against the Chicago Bears. Zappe relieved a struggling Jones during the second quarter after the latter threw an interception. He threw a touchdown pass on his first drive and led the Patriots to a touchdown on his second, but did not score again and threw two interceptions in the fourth quarter of the 33–14 defeat. Zappe was retained as the team's backup behind Jones for the remainder of the season, not seeing play again in his rookie season.

==== 2023 ====
On August 29, 2023, Zappe was waived by the Patriots as part of final roster cuts and re-signed to the team's practice squad the following day. On September 9, Zappe was signed to the active roster, returning as backup to Jones.

After making several relief appearances throughout the season, Zappe was named the starter for Week 13 against the Los Angeles Chargers after struggles from Mac Jones. The Patriots lost 0–6 as Zappe completed 13 of 25 passes for 141 yards, marking Zappe's first career loss as a starter. He started the following game against the Pittsburgh Steelers, leading New England to a 21–18 upset victory as he passed for 3 touchdowns in the first half. After a home loss to the Kansas City Chiefs, Zappe led the Patriots to a 26–23 win over the Denver Broncos, but struggled against the Buffalo Bills and New York Jets in the Patriots' final two games of the season. In those two games combined, he threw for less than 300 yards, five interceptions and no touchdowns; three of the five interceptions came in the first half of the Bills game alone.

On August 26, 2024, Zappe was waived by the Patriots as part of final roster cuts.

=== Kansas City Chiefs (first stint) ===
On August 28, 2024, Zappe was signed to the practice squad of the Kansas City Chiefs.

=== Cleveland Browns (first stint) ===
On October 22, 2024, Zappe was signed to the active roster of the Cleveland Browns from the Chiefs' practice squad, following a season-ending achilles tear for Browns' starter Deshaun Watson. On January 2, 2025, Zappe was announced as Cleveland's starting quarterback for their Week 18 game against the Baltimore Ravens.

=== Kansas City Chiefs (second stint) ===
On March 17, 2025, Zappe signed a one-year contract with the Kansas City Chiefs. He was waived on August 25 as part of preliminary roster cuts.

=== Cleveland Browns (second stint) ===
On August 28, 2025, Zappe signed with the Cleveland Browns' practice squad.

=== New York Jets ===
On January 12, 2026, Zappe signed a reserve/future contract with the New York Jets. He was waived by New York as a part of final roster cuts on August 30. On September 1, the Jets re–signed Zappe to their practice squad. Zappe was released by New York on September 22.

== NFL career statistics ==
=== Regular season ===
| Year | Team | Games | | | Passing | | | | | | | | | Rushing | | | | | Sacks | | Fumbles | |
| Year | Team | GP | GS | Record | Cmp | Att | Pct | Yds | Avg | Lng | TD | Int | Rtg | Att | Yds | Avg | Lng | TD | Sck | Yds | Fum | Lost |
|---|---|---|---|---|---|---|---|---|---|---|---|---|---|---|---|---|---|---|---|---|---|---|
| 2022 | NE | 4 | 2 | 2–0 | 65 | 92 | 70.7 | 781 | 8.5 | 53 | 5 | 3 | 100.9 | 10 | 0 | 0.0 | 5 | 0 | 6 | 40 | 4 | 3 |
| 2023 | NE | 10 | 6 | 2–4 | 127 | 212 | 59.9 | 1,272 | 6.0 | 48 | 6 | 9 | 68.8 | 17 | 83 | 4.9 | 18 | 1 | 25 | 191 | 2 | 1 |
| 2024 | CLE | 1 | 1 | 0–1 | 16 | 31 | 51.6 | 170 | 5.5 | 30 | 1 | 2 | 51.8 | 2 | 2 | 1.0 | 3 | 0 | 1 | 5 | 0 | 0 |
| Career | | 15 | 9 | 4–5 | 208 | 335 | 62.1 | 2,223 | 6.6 | 53 | 12 | 14 | 76.0 | 29 | 85 | 2.9 | 18 | 1 | 32 | 236 | 6 | 4 |
