= 2021 Boca Raton Bowl =

Postseason college football bowl game

2021 RoofClaim.com Boca Raton Bowl
- 8th Boca Raton Bowl
Western Kentucky Hilltoppers	Appalachian State Mountaineers
(8–5)	(10–3)
C-USA	Sun Belt
59	38
Head coach: Tyson Helton	Head coach: Shawn Clark
	1	2	3	4	Total
Western Kentucky	14	17	21	7	59
Appalachian State	14	10	7	7	38
- Date: December 18, 2021
- Season: 2021
- Stadium: FAU Stadium
- Location: Boca Raton, Florida
- MVP: Offense: Bailey Zappe (QB, Western Kentucky); Defense: Antwon Kincaid (DB, Western Kentucky); Sp. teams: John Haggerty III (P, Western Kentucky)
- Favorite: Appalachian State by 2.5
- Referee: Steve Baron (Mountain West)
- Attendance: 15,429

United States TV coverage
- Network: ESPN; ESPN Radio
- Announcers: ESPN: Clay Matvick (play-by-play), Rocky Boiman (analyst), and Tiffany Blackmon (sideline); ESPN Radio: Chris Carlin (play-by-play), EJ Manuel (analyst), and Taylor Davis (sideline)

The 2021 Boca Raton Bowl was a college football bowl game played on December 18, 2021, with kickoff at 11:00 a.m. EST on ESPN. It was the 8th edition of the Boca Raton Bowl, and was one of the 2021–22 bowl games concluding the 2021 FBS football season. Sponsored by roofing repair company RoofClaim.com, the game was officially known as the RoofClaim.com Boca Raton Bowl.

== Teams ==
Consistent with conference tie-ins, the game was played between teams from the Sun Belt Conference and Conference USA (C-USA). The bowl also has tie-ins with the American Athletic Conference (AAC), Mid-American Conference (MAC), and Mountain West Conference (MWC).

This was the sixth meeting between Western Kentucky and Appalachian State; the Mountaineers entered leading the all-time series, 4–1. It was also the first time the Mountaineers and Hilltoppers played each other as FBS teams.

Western Kentucky quarterback Bailey Zappe entered the game on the verge of FBS records for single-season passing yardage and touchdowns, respectively set by B. J. Symons of Texas Tech in 2003 and Joe Burrow of LSU in 2019.

== Game summary ==
During the game, Zappe threw for 6 touchdowns and 422 yards, giving him possession of both aforementioned single-season FBS passing records. He finished the season with 62 touchdowns and 5,977 yards. Zappe also tied Burrow's single-season FBS record of 65 touchdowns responsible for (combined passing and rushing) from 2019.

2021 RoofClaim.com Boca Raton Bowl

Quarter	1	2	3	4	Total
Western Kentucky	14	17	21	7	59
Appalachian State	14	10	7	7	38

at FAU Stadium • Boca Raton, Florida

- Date: Friday, December 18, 2021
- Game time: 11:00 a.m. EST
- Game weather: Cloudy • Temperature: 81 °F (27 °C) • Wind: SE 17 mph
- Game attendance: 15,429
- Referee: Steve Baron
- TV announcers (ESPN): Clay Matvick (play-by-play), Rocky Boiman (analyst), and Tiffany Blackmon (sideline)
- Box score

Scoring summary

Quarter	Time	Drive			Team	Scoring information	Score	
Quarter	Time	Plays	Yards	TOP	Team	Scoring information	WKU	APP
1	13:14	8	74	1:46	Western Kentucky	Jerreth Sterns 1-yard touchdown reception from Bailey Zappe, Brayden Narveson kick good	7	0
1	3:25	6	63	2:58	Appalachian State	Malik Williams 36-yard touchdown reception from Chase Brice, Chandler Staton kick good	7	7
1	3:11	1	75	0:14	Western Kentucky	Mitchell Tinsley 75-yard touchdown reception from Bailey Zappe, Brayden Narveson kick good	14	7
1	1:11	5	76	2:00	Appalachian State	Jalen Virgil 60-yard touchdown reception from Chase Brice, Chandler Staton kick good	14	14
2	11:48	7	64	1:21	Western Kentucky	24-yard field goal by Brayden Narveson	17	14
2	8:57	5	61	2:51	Appalachian State	Dashaun Davis 33-yard touchdown reception from Chase Brice, Chandler Staton kick good	17	21
2	6:54	8	75	2:03	Western Kentucky	Joey Beljan 5-yard touchdown reception from Bailey Zappe, Brayden Narveson kick good	24	21
2	2:55	8	64	3:59	Appalachian State	28-yard field goal by Chandler Staton	24	24
2	0:29	8	78	2:26	Western Kentucky	Jerreth Sterns 10-yard touchdown reception from Bailey Zappe, Brayden Narveson kick good	31	24
3	12:49	1	86	0:12	Western Kentucky	Noah Whittington 86-yard touchdown run, Brayden Narveson kick good	38	24
3	5:56	11	73	4:38	Western Kentucky	Mitchell Tinsley 2-yard touchdown reception from Bailey Zappe, Brayden Narveson kick good	45	24
3	5:38	1	62	0:18	Appalachian State	Christian Wells 62-yard touchdown reception from Chase Brice, Chandler Staton kick good	45	31
3	2:42	6	75	2:56	Western Kentucky	Jerreth Sterns 37-yard touchdown reception from Bailey Zappe, Brayden Narveson kick good	52	31
4	9:40	2	2	0:09	Western Kentucky	Kye Robichaux 2-yard touchdown run, Brayden Narveson kick good	59	31
4	1:55	7	69	2:17	Appalachian State	Anderson Castle 9-yard touchdown run, Chandler Staton kick good	59	38
"TOP" = time of possession. For other American football terms, see Glossary of American football.							59	38

=== Statistics ===
Statistics	WKU	APP
First downs	27	24
Plays–yards	75–637	78–609
Rushes–yards	28–215	43–251
Passing yards	422	358
Passing: comp–att–int	33–47–0	20–35–2
Time of possession	28:48	31:12

Team	Category	Player	Statistics
Western Kentucky	Passing	Bailey Zappe	33/47, 422 yards, 6 TD
Western Kentucky	Rushing	Noah Whittington	7 carries, 150 yards, 1 TD
Western Kentucky	Receiving	Jerreth Sterns	13 receptions, 184 yards, 3 TD
Appalachian State	Passing	Chase Brice	15/23, 317 yards, 4 TD, 1 INT
Appalachian State	Rushing	Camerun Peoples	13 carries, 101 yards
Appalachian State	Receiving	Christian Wells	4 receptions, 86 yards, 1 TD
