= Victoria East High School =

Location
- 4103 East Mockingbird Lane; Victoria, Texas, 77904; United States; 28.8496°N 96.9697°W

Information
- Established: 2010
- School district: Victoria Independent School District
- Superintendent: Sheila Collazo
- Principal: Suzann Creager
- Faculty: 134
- Grades: 9-12
- Enrollment: 1,847 (2023-2024)
- Colors: Red, black, and gold
- Fight song: "Go Mighty Titans!"
- Athletics conference: UIL Class AAAAA
- Mascot: Hyperion the Titan
- Team name: Titans
- Newspaper: The Hyperion Herald
- Feeder schools: Howell Middle School and STEM Middle School
- Website: vehs.visd.net

Victoria East High School is one of two public high schools in the Victoria Independent School District in Victoria, Texas, United States. It has 1,885 students in grades 9 through 12. It is the 314th largest public high school in Texas and the 1,931st largest nationally. It has a student teacher ratio of 14.0 to 1.

== Extracurricular activities ==
Victoria East was moved to the state's second highest classification, 5A, in 2014 when Texas added a 6A classification.

=== Athletics ===
The Victoria East Titans compete in the following sports:

- Baseball
- Basketball (boys' and girls')
- Cross country
- Football
- Golf (boys' and girls')
- Power-lifting
- Soccer (boys' and girls')
- Softball
- Swimming
- Tennis
- Track (boys' and girls')
- Volleyball
- Wrestling
- Cheerleading

=== Clubs ===
The video game club meets Wednesdays after school, competing in SSBU, Rock Band, Minecraft, and more. On Tuesdays, they play tabletop games like Uno and Magic: The Gathering.
