= Jerreth Sterns =

American gridiron football player (born 1999)

- Sterns with the Montreal Alouettes in 2026

No. 89 – Montreal Alouettes
- Position: Wide receiver
- Roster status: Active
- CFL status: American

Personal information
- Born: July 1, 1999 (age 27); Waxahachie, Texas, U.S.
- Listed height: 5 ft 8 in (1.73 m)
- Listed weight: 184 lb (83 kg)

Career information
- High school: Waxahachie (Waxahachie, TX)
- College: Houston Baptist (2018–2020); Western Kentucky (2021)
- NFL draft: 2022: undrafted

Career history
- Tampa Bay Buccaneers (2022)*; Los Angeles Rams (2022)*; Saskatchewan Roughriders (2023–2024); Winnipeg Blue Bombers (2025); Montreal Alouettes (2026–present)
- * Offseason or practice squad member only

Awards and highlights
- C-USA Newcomer of the Year (2021); Second-team All-American (2021); NCAA receptions leader (2021); NCAA receiving yards leader (2021); NCAA receiving touchdowns co-leader (2021); First-team All-C-USA (2021)

Career CFL statistics as of 2026
- Receptions: 166
- Receiving yards: 1,866
- Receiving touchdowns: 7
- Stats at CFL.ca

Jerreth Sterns (born July 1, 1999) is an American professional football wide receiver for the Montreal Alouettes of the Canadian Football League (CFL). He played college football at Houston Baptist before transferring to Western Kentucky.

== Early life ==
Sterns went to Waxahachie High School. As a senior, Sterns caught 8 touchdown passes for 956 yards. He was rated as a 2-star recruit and the 374th best player in the state of Texas according to 247 Sports. Sterns was originally committed to Army but he decommitted and flipped to Houston Baptist.

== College career ==
=== Houston Baptist ===
Sterns played in 11 games as a freshman. He recorded four receiving touchdowns and one rushing touchdown. His first career touchdown came against SMU.

In the 2019 season, Sterns recorded ten total touchdowns on 867 receiving yards in 12 games as a sophomore. In a game against Lamar, he would have three touchdown receptions.

In 2020, during a shortened four-game season, Sterns would have five touchdowns and 454 yards. In 27 games with Houston Baptist, Sterns would record 18 touchdowns on 220 receptions for 1,971 yards. On December 14, 2020, Sterns along with HBU quarterback Bailey Zappe announced their decision to transfer after the 2020 season.

=== Western Kentucky ===
On December 18, 2020, Sterns announced he would be transferring to Western Kentucky following former Houston Baptist OC Zach Kittley and quarterback Bailey Zappe. Sterns played in all of Western Kentucky's 14 games posting career highs of 17 touchdowns and 1,902 receiving yards on 150 catches. Sterns was the NCAA's leader in receiving yards, receptions and was tied for most receiving touchdowns. Behind Sterns and Zappe, the Hilltoppers won the Boca Raton Bowl and earned a spot in the C-USA Championship Game. On December 19, 2021, Sterns announced he would be declaring for the 2022 NFL draft.

== Professional career ==
Pre-draft measurables
Height	Weight	Arm length	Hand span	Wingspan	40-yard dash	10-yard split	20-yard split	20-yard shuttle	Three-cone drill	Vertical jump	Broad jump	Bench press
5 ft 7 3/8 in (1.71 m)	183 lb (83 kg)	30 1/8 in (0.77 m)	9 in (0.23 m)	6 ft 0 in (1.83 m)	4.62 s	1.60 s	2.62 s	4.14 s	6.80 s	40.0 in (1.02 m)	9 ft 11 in (3.02 m)	12 reps
All values from Pro Day

=== Tampa Bay Buccaneers ===
Sterns signed with the Tampa Bay Buccaneers as an undrafted free agent on May 13, 2022. He was waived on August 30, 2022.

=== Los Angeles Rams ===
On December 22, 2022, Sterns signed with the practice squad of the Los Angeles Rams. He signed a reserve/futures contract on January 9, 2023.

On March 10, 2023, Sterns was waived.

=== Saskatchewan Roughriders ===
On July 3, 2023, he signed with the Saskatchewan Roughriders of the Canadian Football League. On August 6, Sterns made his professional debut, totaling seven receptions for 71 yards, being named the Breakout Player of the Week. On August 20, Sterns recorded his first career touchdown, an 18-yard pass from Jake Dolegala. He finished his first season in the CFL recording 44 receptions for 449 yards and a touchdown. He became a free agent upon the expiry of his contract on February 11, 2025.

=== Winnipeg Blue Bombers ===
On February 11, 2025, Sterns signed with the Winnipeg Blue Bombers as a free agent after two seasons in Saskatchewan. He played in 14 regular season games where he had 48 catches for 530 yards and four touchdowns. He became a free agent upon the expiry of his contract on February 10, 2026.

=== Montreal Alouettes ===
On February 10, 2026, it was announced that Sterns had signed with the Montreal Alouettes.

== Personal life ==
Sterns has six siblings, including former Denver Broncos safety Caden Sterns. His father played basketball for Baylor. Sterns is a Christian.
