= Zach Kittley =

American football coach (born 1991)

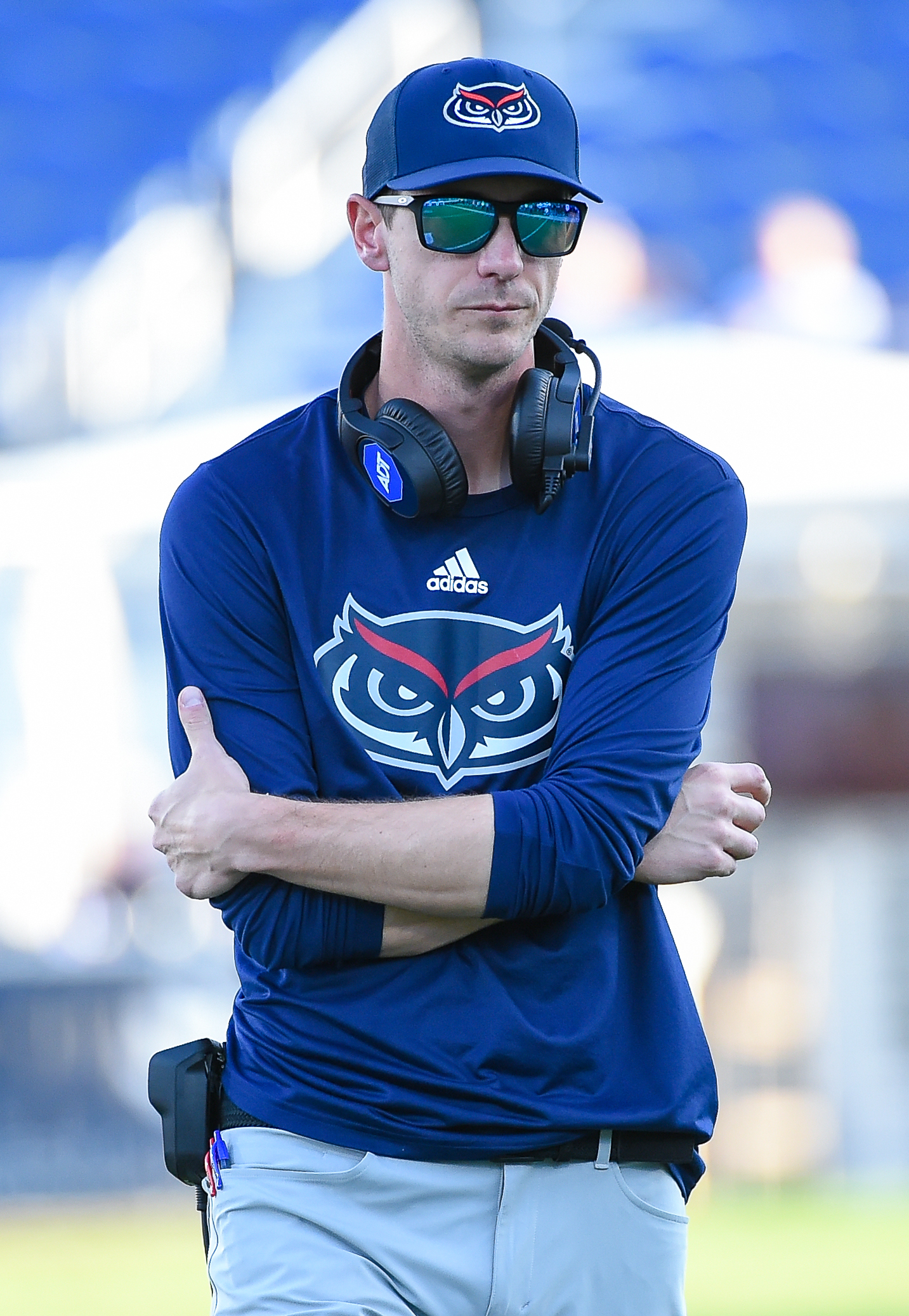
- Kittley in 2025

Current position
- Title: Head coach
- Team: Florida Atlantic
- Conference: American
- Record: 11–12

Biographical details
- Born: August 14, 1991 (age 35); Abilene, Texas, U.S.
- Education: Texas Tech University

Coaching career (HC unless noted)
- 2013–2014: Texas Tech (SA)
- 2015–2017: Texas Tech (GA)
- 2018–2020: Houston Baptist (OC/QB)
- 2021: Western Kentucky (OC/QB)
- 2022–2024: Texas Tech (OC/QB)
- 2025–present: Florida Atlantic

Head coaching record
- Overall: 11–12

Zach Kittley (born August 14, 1991) is an American college football coach. He is the head football coach at Florida Atlantic University, a position he has held since 2025. He was previously the offensive coordinator for Houston Baptist, Western Kentucky, and his alma mater, Texas Tech.

== Coaching career ==
=== Early career ===
Kittley initially committed to playing college basketball at Abilene Christian, walking on to the team in 2011, but opted to pursue a career coaching football and transferred to Texas Tech University. From there, Kittley got a position on the football team as a student assistant to Sonny Cumbie. He was later promoted to graduate assistant in 2015, where he was the program's assistant quarterbacks coach and worked closely with future NFL MVP Patrick Mahomes.

=== Houston Baptist ===
Kittley was hired as the offensive coordinator and quarterbacks coach at Houston Baptist in 2018. At Houston Baptist, he engineered a turnaround of an offense that ranked in the bottom half of the NCAA Division I FCS division prior to his arrival to one of the top passing offenses in the country behind an Air raid offense. While at HBU, Kittley was intimately involved with the development of another quarterback prospect in Bailey Zappe, who would play a critical role at his next coaching stop.

=== Western Kentucky ===
Kittley was named the offensive coordinator and quarterbacks coach at Western Kentucky on December 14, 2020. Zappe would follow Kittley to Western Kentucky. In Kittley's first year with Western Kentucky, the Hilltoppers offense improved from 115th in scoring among FBS teams in 2020 to 2nd in the FBS in scoring in 2021. During WKU's win in the 2021 Boca Raton Bowl, Zappe set new single-season FBS records for passing touchdowns and yardage.

=== Texas Tech ===
Kittley was named the offensive coordinator and quarterbacks coach at Texas Tech on December 5, 2021, joining head coach Joey McGuire in his first season.

=== Florida Atlantic ===
Florida Atlantic hired Kittley as its new head coach on December 2, 2024, succeeding Tom Herman.

== Personal life ==
Kittley is the son of Wes Kittley, who has been the track and field coach at Texas Tech since 2000 and was previously the track and field coach at Abilene Christian. Kittley and his wife, Emily, have three sons.

== Head coaching record ==
Year	Team	Overall	Conference	Standing	Bowl/playoffs
Florida Atlantic Owls (American Conference) (2025–present)
2025	Florida Atlantic	4–8	3–5	T–9th	
2026	Florida Atlantic	7–4	4–3		
Florida Atlantic:		11–12	7–8		
Total:		11–12			
