= 2021 Myrtle Beach Bowl =

Postseason college football bowl game

2021 Myrtle Beach Bowl presented by TaxAct
- 2nd Myrtle Beach Bowl
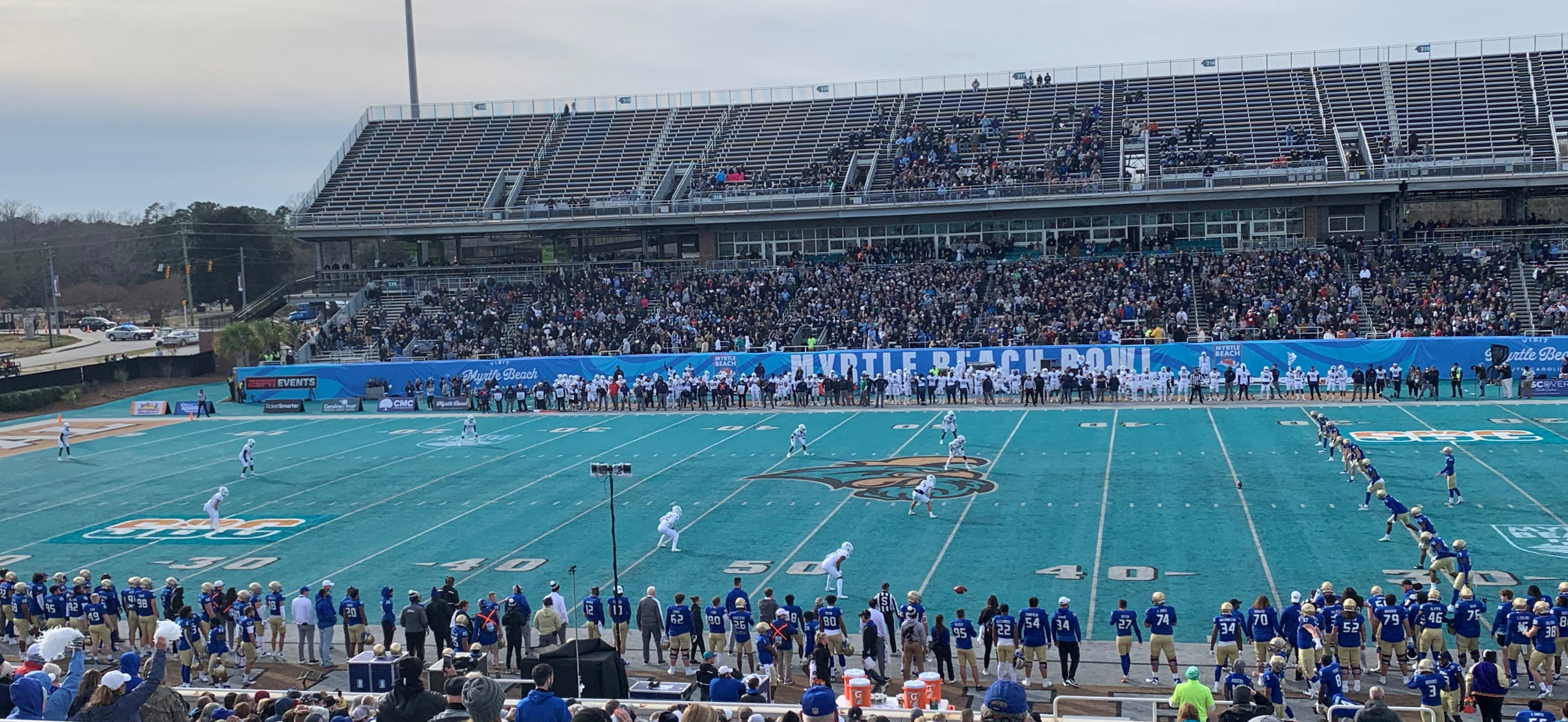
- Tulsa and Old Dominion lined up for the opening kickoff
Old Dominion Monarchs	Tulsa Golden Hurricane
(6–6)	(6–6)
C–USA	AAC
17	30
Head coach: Ricky Rahne	Head coach: Philip Montgomery
	1	2	3	4	Total
Old Dominion	7	3	0	7	17
Tulsa	14	3	6	7	30
- Date: December 20, 2021
- Season: 2021
- Stadium: Brooks Stadium
- Location: Conway, South Carolina
- MVP: Davis Brin (QB, Tulsa)
- Favorite: Tulsa by 7.5
- Referee: Cal McNeill (Mountain West)
- Attendance: 6,557

United States TV coverage
- Network: ESPN
- Announcers: Mike Corey (play-by-play), Hutson Mason (analyst), Marty Smith and Ryan McGee (sideline)

International TV coverage
- Network: ESPN Brazil
- Announcers: Matheus Pinheiro (play-by-play) and Weinny Eirado (analyst)

The 2021 Myrtle Beach Bowl was a college football bowl game played on December 20, 2021, at Brooks Stadium in Conway, South Carolina. The second edition of the Myrtle Beach Bowl, the game featured the Old Dominion Monarchs of Conference USA and the Tulsa Golden Hurricane of the American Athletic Conference. The game began at 2:30 p.m. EST and was televised on ESPN. It was one of the 2021–22 bowl games concluding the 2021 FBS football season. Tax preparation software company TaxAct served as the game's presenting sponsor; the game was officially known as the Myrtle Beach Bowl presented by TaxAct.

Both teams entered the contest with identical records of 6–6 overall and 5–3 in their respective conferences, and both entered on winning streaks of multiple games. Old Dominion won the final five games of their regular season, while Tulsa finished their regular season on a three-game winning streak; both programs achieved bowl eligibility with wins in their final regular season game. Tulsa was favored to win the game, as they entered the game favored to win by 7.5 points. The game was expected to see a close matchup between Tulsa's rushing offense and Old Dominion's rushing defense, both of which finished third in their conferences.

The game started quickly, as LaMareon James returned the opening kickoff for a touchdown; Tulsa responded with two scores of their own in the first quarter, which also saw Old Dominion miss a field goal. Both offenses saw fewer success in the game's second and third quarters; each team scored a field goal from similar distance in the second quarter – Tulsa led by seven points at halftime – while Tulsa added two additional field goals in the third quarter. The Golden Hurricane lead grew to as much as twenty points in the fourth quarter after a 4-yard passing touchdown, though Old Dominion scored the game's final touchdown with just over seven minutes to play. Tulsa was able to run the final minutes off the clock and secure a 30–17 win, the eleventh bowl win in their program's history.

== Teams ==
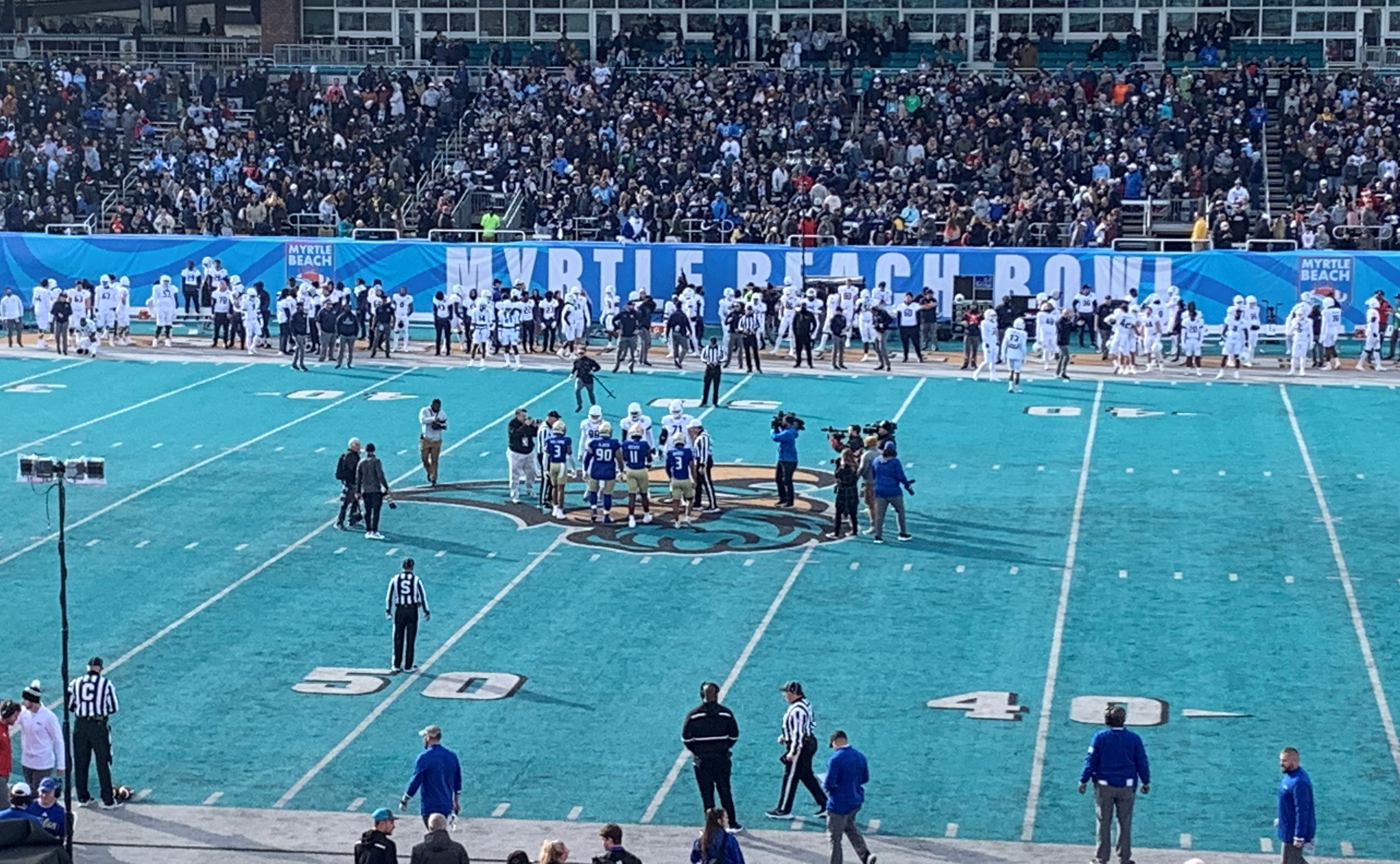
The referees and captains of each team in the middle of the field for the pre-game coin toss

Consistent with the bowl game's conference tie-ins, the contest featured the Tulsa Golden Hurricane from the American Athletic Conference. Despite the other tie-ins being with the Mid-American Conference and the Sun Belt Conference, Tulsa's opponent was selected to be the Old Dominion Monarchs from Conference USA. This was the first-ever meeting between the two teams. Both teams made their first appearances in the Myrtle Beach Bowl, which was in just its second year. Old Dominion made their second bowl game appearance in program history, following their win in the 2016 Bahamas Bowl, while Tulsa made their 23rd bowl game appearance, with their last appearance coming in a loss in the 2020 Armed Forces Bowl.

=== Old Dominion Monarchs ===
Old Dominion started their season with a pair of blowout games, one in their favor and one against; the Monarchs' first game was a road loss to Wake Forest, but they followed this up with a win in their home opener against Hampton. The Monarchs then began a rough patch in their season that saw them lose five consecutive games, beginning with a road loss to Liberty. The first close game of the season saw the Monarchs fall to Buffalo by one point to finish September. ODU began conference play in the following weeks with a pair of road games against UTEP and Marshall; both games were one-touchdown losses for Old Dominion, the latter in overtime. The Monarchs' next game was their homecoming game, and they fell to Western Kentucky. Following a bye week, ODU's fortunes turned; with a record of 1–6, the Monarchs won each of their remaining five regular season games. Old Dominion earned their first conference victory against Louisiana Tech, and followed that up with their first conference win on the road against FIU to begin November. They then defeated Florida Atlantic and Middle Tennessee to improve to 5–6. Facing Charlotte, also 5–6, in their final regular season game, the Monarchs won by three possessions to secure bowl eligibility. They entered the game with a 6–6 overall record and a 5–3 record in conference.

=== Tulsa Golden Hurricane ===
The Tulsa Golden Hurricane began their season with a rough loss, in a home game against FCS-ranked UC Davis. A pair of road losses then dropped the Golden Hurricane to 0–3; Tulsa fell to Oklahoma State and No. 9 Ohio State in successive weeks. Their first win came the following week against Arkansas State, but they dropped their conference opener the next week against Houston. The next game saw Tulsa defeat Memphis by six points; the Golden Hurricane's first road victory came the following week when they defeated South Florida by one. This put Tulsa's record at 3–4 heading into their bye week, and afterwards, they returned home to face Navy; the Midshipmen came away with a three-point victory. To begin the month of November, Tulsa traveled to take on No. 6 Cincinnati in a game that hosted College GameDay and saw Cincinnati pull an eight-point victory. Needing three wins in their final three regular season games, the Tulsa team achieved just that; they defeated Tulane in overtime on the road, returned home to beat Temple in convincing fashion, and squeaked by SMU by a field goal on the road to achieve bowl eligibility. Tulsa entered the contest with a record of 6–6 and a 5–3 mark in conference play.

== Game summary ==
=== Pre-game ===
Entering the game, Tulsa was broadly expected to win; the points spread opened with Tulsa favored by 9.5 points but narrowed to 7.5 points by the time of kickoff. Tulsa's rushing offense was viewed as an asset, but was expected to match up well with Old Dominion's defensive line; while Tulsa finished third in their conference in rushing offense, Old Dominion similarly finished third in their conference in rushing defense. The rushing game was expected to be Tulsa's most effective method of moving the ball, as quarterback Davis Brin entered the game having thrown an equal number of touchdowns and interceptions. Both teams entered the game among the most turnover-prone and penalized teams in the nation, which led to predictions that the more disciplined team in both regards would have a sizable advantage.

The weather at kickoff was sunny with a temperature of 47 °F (8 °C). The crew of officials, representing the Mountain West Conference, was led by referee Cal McNeill.

=== First half ===
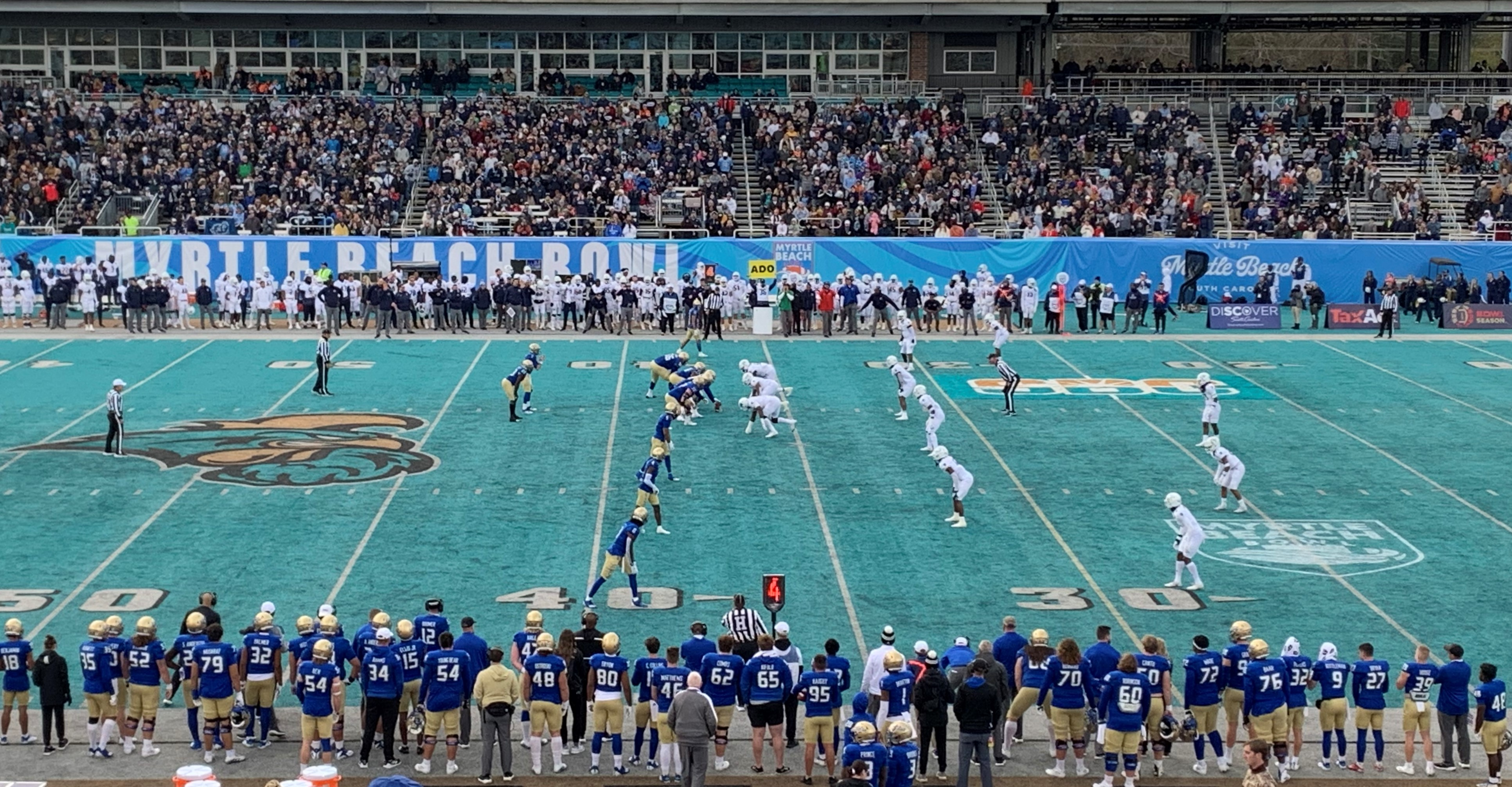
The teams at the line of scrimmage in the second quarter, with Tulsa (blue) on offense and Old Dominion (white) on defense

Scheduled for a 2:30 p.m. EST start, the game began at 2:35 p.m. with Tyler Tipton's opening kickoff. The game began quickly, as the opening kickoff was returned 100 yards for an Old Dominion touchdown by LaMareon James. Tulsa's first drive of the game went just as well; Davis Brin found JuanCarlos Santana for a 38-yard gain on the drive's third play, which eventually led to a one-yard rushing touchdown by Shamari Brooks that leveled the score at seven. Old Dominion was able to move the ball effectively on their first offensive series of the game; they reached midfield in six plays after starting at their own 25-yard-line. The Monarchs found themselves unable to convert on a 3rd & 5 at the Tulsa 24-yard-line and had to attempt a field goal, but Nick Rice's 41-yard kick was unsuccessful, giving Tulsa possession of the ball. The Golden Hurricane had little problem moving the ball on this drive, gaining three first downs and converting a 3rd & 6 for a 23-yard passing touchdown from Davis Brin to Josh Johnson; this gave Tulsa their first lead of the game. The first three-and-out of the contest came on Old Dominion's next possession; after LaMareon James' kickoff return reached the Monarchs' 18-yard-line, and a false start penalty moved them back before they were able to snap the ball for the first time, they were only able to make it back to their own 16-yard-line before punting on 4th & 12. The punt was fair caught at the Tulsa 45-yard-line, giving the Golden Hurricane offense excellent field position, but after failing to convert 3rd & 1 at the Old Dominion 46-yard-line, Tulsa head coach Philip Montgomery elected to keep his offense on the field and go for it, a decision which backfired when Braylon Braxton was tackled behind the line of scrimmage for a loss of 2 yards. Now receiving great field position of their own, the Old Dominion offense was able to advance to the Tulsa 33-yard-line before the end of the game's first quarter.

Now with momentum, the Monarchs' offense made its way to the Tulsa 14-yard-line before they were stopped on 3rd & 6, forcing them to attempt their second field goal of the game. Unlike the first, this one was successful, with Nick Rice's 32-yard attempt narrowing Tulsa's lead to four points. Tulsa's first three-and-out came on their first drive of the second quarter; a sack by Jordan Young on second down pushed the Golden Hurricane back to third-and-long, eventually forcing a punt. A long pass on Old Dominion's next third down got them to the Tulsa 38-yard-line, but a face mask penalty on the next play pushed them back into their own territory; the drive stalled from there and the Monarchs punted on 4th & 14. Starting their next drive from their own 8-yard-line, Tulsa moved past midfield on the drive's third play, as Davis Brin found Josh Johnson for a 43-yard completion. However, like ODU's last possession, the drive was derailed by a 15-yard penalty; a personal foul set them back to second-and-long, eventually leading to a punt. Tulsa's punt was a good one, as it was downed at the Old Dominion 4-yard-line. On the fifth play of the ensuing drive, Hayden Wolff's pass was intercepted on the sideline by LJ Wallace, giving Tulsa the ball at their own 46-yard-line; however, an unsportsmanlike conduct penalty for excessive celebration pushed the ball back to the Tulsa 31-yard-line. The Golden Hurricane recovered, converting a 4th & 2 on the Old Dominion 34-yard-line to keep their drive alive and increasing their lead to seven points with a 35-yard Zack Long field goal with nine seconds remaining in the half.

=== Second half ===
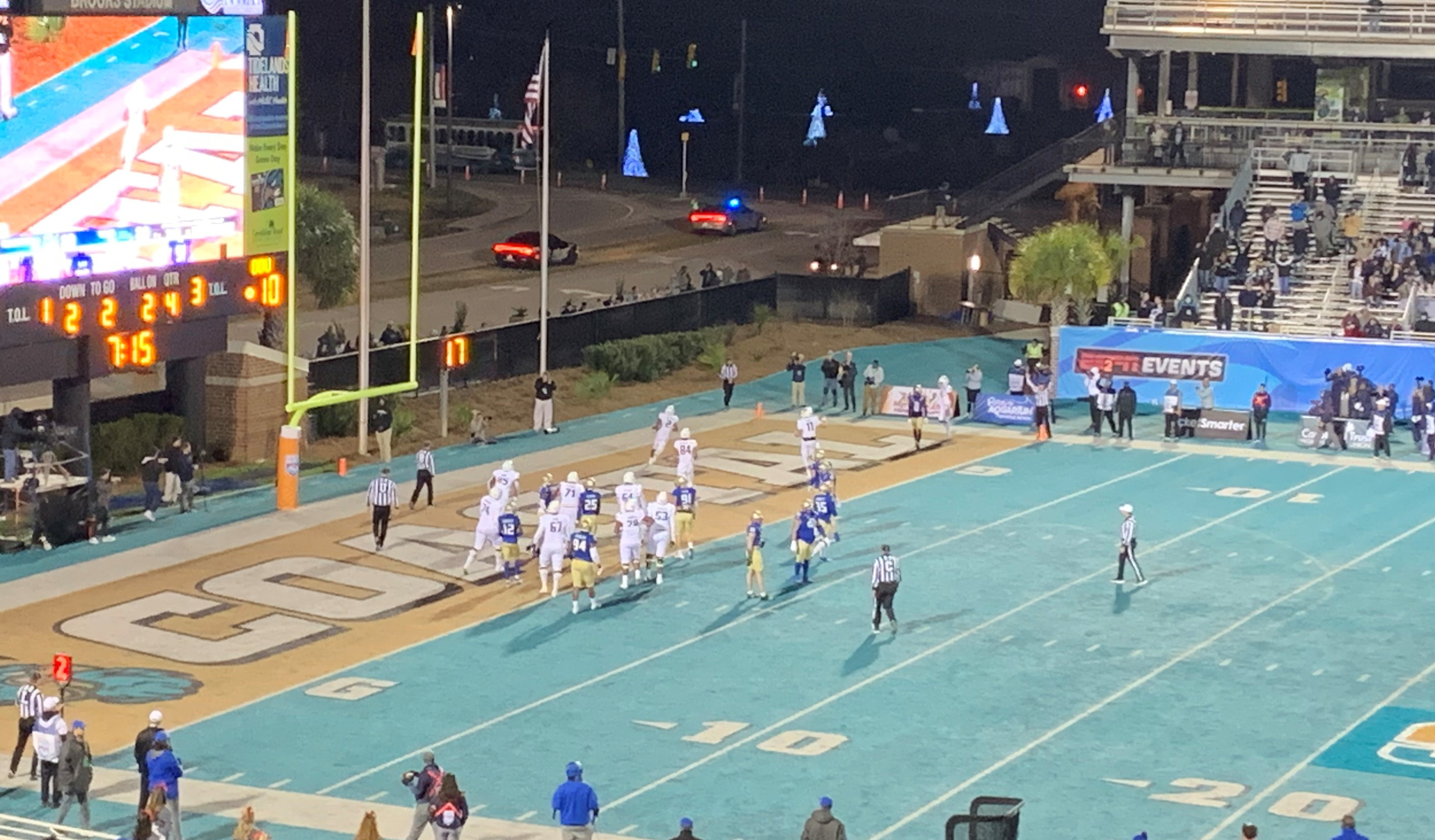
Blake Watson (wearing No. 2 in white) scores a touchdown for Old Dominion in the fourth quarter

Tulsa began the second half with the ball, after Anthony Watkins returned Dominik Soos's kickoff to the 23-yard-line. The Golden Hurricane's first drive of the third quarter was a long one; it spanned 70 yards over 15 plays and took nearly half of the quarter, including a third down conversion and a fourth down conversion, before the Old Dominion defense forced a pair of incompletions at the ODU 7-yard-line, leading Tulsa to attempt a 25-yard field goal, which Zack Long successfully converting it to make the score 20–10. The Monarchs' ensuing drive was short-lived; they went three-and-out after Hayden Wolff was sacked by Jaxon Player for a loss of seven yards on first down. Tulsa took possession at their own 33-yard-line and again drove into field goal range, but again found themselves unable to convert a third down inside the red zone. The 32-yard field goal attempt by Zack Long was good, increasing the Golden Hurricane's lead to thirteen points. Starting their next drive at their own 19-yard-line, Old Dominion quickly went three-and-out after two incompletions and a completion for no gain. Their punt was downed at the Tulsa 42-yard-line, though the ball was pushed back to the Tulsa 32-yard-line due to a holding penalty on the play. A pair of completions of ten and fifteen yards to Malachai Jones and Shamari Brooks, respectively, helped the Tulsa offense into Old Dominion territory within four plays, as they advanced to the Old Dominion 37-yard-line before the clock expired.

After two plays in the fourth quarter, Tulsa found themselves facing a 4th & 1 at the Old Dominion 32-yard-line, though an unsportsmanlike conduct penalty pushed them back to a 4th & 16. Despite this, punter Lachlan Wilson took the snap and ran with it in an attempt to gain the required sixteen yards; he came up far short, being pushed out of bounds after a loss of one yard and giving Old Dominion the ball back at their own 48-yard-line. A Blake Watson rush for 22 yards on the first play of Old Dominion's ensuing drive put them at the Tulsa 30-yard-line, and a Hayden Wolff pass to Ali Jennings III on the next play very nearly resulted in a touchdown for the Monarchs, but Jennings fumbled through the end zone, resulting in a touchback. Tulsa took advantage of this blunder, reaching Old Dominion territory in two plays and converting two third downs before scoring a 4-yard passing touchdown from Davis Brin to Ethan Hall on 3rd & goal. Old Dominion responded quickly; a 34-yard pass from Wolff to Jennings got the Monarchs all the way down to the Tulsa 3-yard-line; they scored two plays later with a Blake Watson rush, their first touchdown since the opening kickoff. Taking possession at their own 10-yard-line, Tulsa ran the ball for each of the first eleven plays of the drive; despite beginning their drive with over seven minutes to play, they were able to force Old Dominion to spend all three of their timeouts and eventually ended the game in victory formation, running out the clock to win the game, 30–17. The game concluded at 6:10 p.m., after a total time of three hours and thirty-five minutes.

=== Scoring summary ===
2021 Myrtle Beach Bowl presented by TaxAct

Quarter	1	2	3	4	Total
Old Dominion	7	3	0	7	17
Tulsa	14	3	6	7	30

at Brooks Stadium • Conway, South Carolina

- Date: December 20, 2021
- Game time: 2:30 p.m. EST
- Game weather: Sunny • Temperature: 47 °F (8 °C)
- Game attendance: 6,557
- Referee: Cal McNeill
- TV announcers (ESPN): Mike Corey (play-by-play), Hutson Mason (analyst), Marty Smith and Ryan McGee (sideline)

Scoring summary

Quarter	Time	Drive			Team	Scoring information	Score	
Quarter	Time	Plays	Yards	TOP	Team	Scoring information	Old Dominion	Tulsa
1	14:46				Old Dominion	LaMareon James 100-yard kickoff return for a touchdown, Nick Rice kick good	7	0
1	13:03	7	74	1:42	Tulsa	Shamari Brooks 1-yard touchdown run, Zack Long kick good	7	7
1	4:47	11	76	3:46	Tulsa	Josh Johnson 23-yard touchdown reception from Davis Brin, Zack Long kick good	7	14
2	12:50	9	38	3:12	Old Dominion	32-yard field goal by Nick Rice	10	14
2	0:09	12	52	3:24	Tulsa	35-yard field goal by Zack Long	10	17
3	8:38	15	70	6:17	Tulsa	25-yard field goal by Zack Long	10	20
3	3:25	11	53	3:54	Tulsa	32-yard field goal by Zack Long	10	23
4	9:04	11	80	3:57	Tulsa	Ethan Hall 4-yard touchdown reception from Davis Brin, Zack Long kick good	10	30
4	7:15	5	60	1:43	Old Dominion	Blake Watson 2-yard touchdown run, Nick Rice kick good	17	30
"TOP" = time of possession. For other American football terms, see Glossary of American football.							17	30

== Statistics ==
Team statistical comparison
Statistic	Old Dominion	Tulsa
First downs	10	35
First downs rushing	4	17
First downs passing	6	15
First downs penalty	0	3
Third down efficiency	5–11	9–19
Fourth down efficiency	0–0	2–4
Total plays–net yards	47–247	99–529
Rushing attempts–net yards	19–71	65–244
Yards per rush	3.7	3.8
Yards passing	176	285
Pass completions–attempts	19–28	22–34
Interceptions thrown	1	0
Punt returns–total yards	0–0	1–0
Kickoff returns–total yards	5–161	4–41
Punts–average yardage	4–39.0	2–37.5
Fumbles–lost	1–1	1–0
Penalties–yards	6–59	8–85
Time of possession	20:17	39:43

Old Dominion statistics
Monarchs passing
	C–A	Yds	TD–INT
Hayden Wolff	19–28	176	0–1
Monarchs rushing
	Car	Yds	TD
Blake Watson	14	77	1
Stone Smartt	1	2	0
Elijah Davis	2	1	0
Hayden Wolff	1	−7	0
Monarchs receiving
	Rec	Yds	TD
Ali Jennings	6	74	0
Stone Smartt	4	28	0
Donta Anthony	1	19	0
Zack Kuntz	2	18	0
Blake Watson	2	14	0
Darius Savedge	1	13	0
Jordan Bly	2	8	0
Elijah Davis	1	2	0

Tulsa statistics
Golden Hurricane passing
	C–A	Yds	TD–INT
Davis Brin	22–34	285	2–0
Golden Hurricane rushing
	Car	Yds	TD
Shamari Brooks	26	107	1
Anthony Watkins	10	55	0
Deneric Prince	11	44	0
Steven Anderson	6	22	0
Davis Brin	5	18	0
JuanCarlos Santana	1	6	0
Braylon Braxton	2	−1	0
Lachlan Wilson	1	−1	0
Golden Hurricane receiving
	Rec	Yds	TD
Josh Johnson	8	129	1
JuanCarlos Santana	6	75	0
Ezra Naylor II	3	37	0
Anthony Watkins	2	15	0
Malachai Jones	1	15	0
Shamari Brooks	1	10	0
Ethan Hall	1	4	1

== Aftermath ==
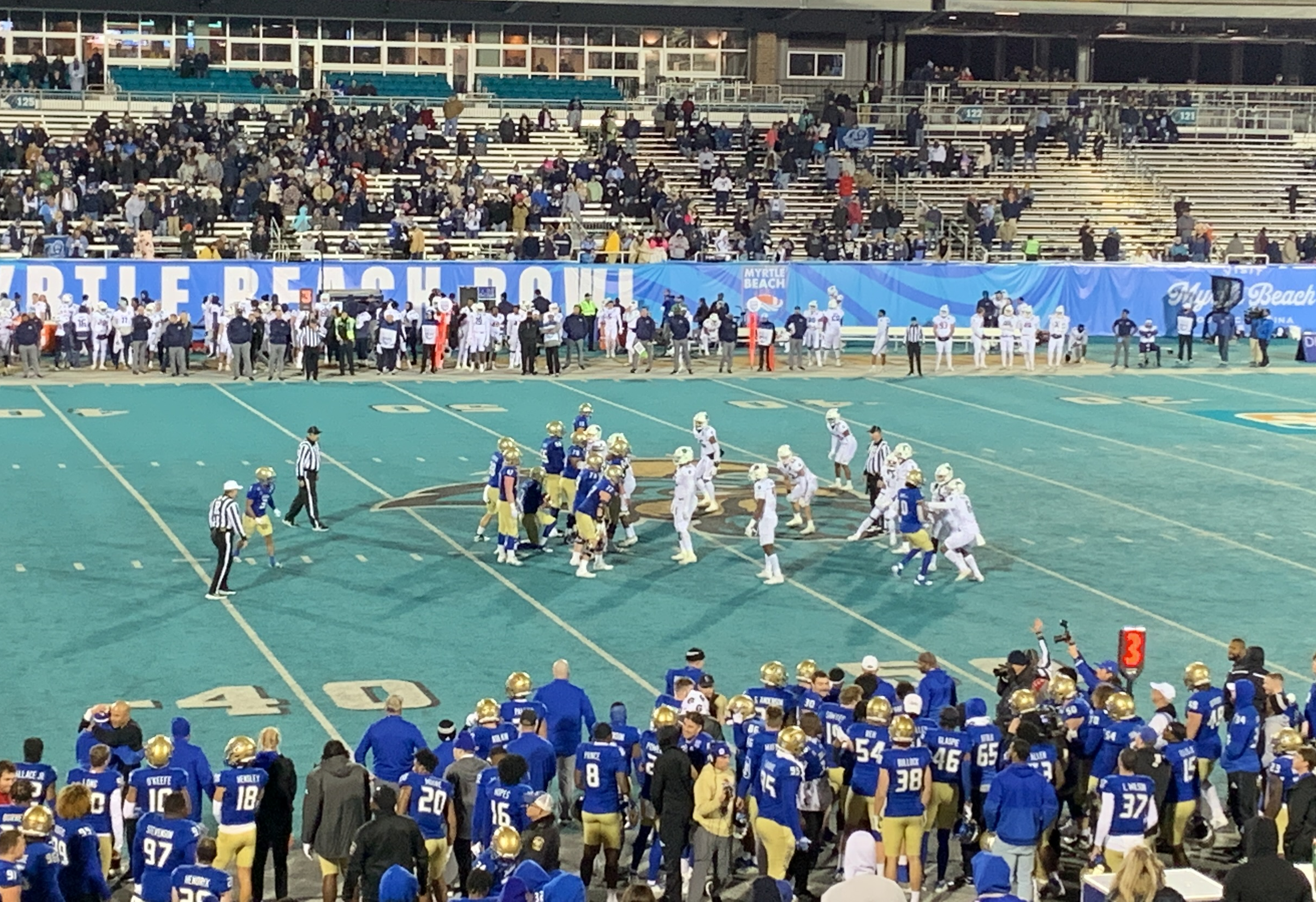
Tulsa quarterback Davis Brin takes a knee to end the game

With the win, Tulsa concluded their season with a record of 7–6; conversely, Old Dominion finished 6–7. Tulsa achieved their first bowl victory since the 2016 Miami Beach Bowl and improved their bowl record as a program to 11–12. Old Dominion's overall bowl record dropped to 1–1 with their first bowl loss; this was the first bowl loss for Old Dominion head coach Ricky Rahne since the 2018 Citrus Bowl, when he was the offensive coordinator at Penn State.

A total of 6,557 people attended the game, marking an increase from the attendance of 5,000 in the inaugural edition. Tulsa quarterback Davis Brin was named the game's most valuable player.
