= 2021 Old Dominion Monarchs football team =

American college football season

2021 Old Dominion Monarchs football

Myrtle Beach Bowl, L 17–30 vs. Tulsa
- Conference: Conference USA
- East Division
- Record: 6–7 (5–3 C-USA)
- Head coach: Ricky Rahne (2nd season)
- Offensive coordinator: Kirk Campbell (2nd season)
- Offensive scheme: Pro spread
- Defensive coordinator: Blake Seiler (2nd season)
- Base defense: 3–2–6
- Home stadium: S.B. Ballard Stadium

2021 Conference USA football standings
	Conf.			Overall
Team	W		L	W		L
East Division
Western Kentucky xy	7	–	1	9	–	5
Marshall	5	–	3	7	–	6
Old Dominion	5	–	3	6	–	7
Middle Tennessee	4	–	4	7	–	6
Florida Atlantic	3	–	5	5	–	7
Charlotte	3	–	5	5	–	7
FIU	0	–	8	1	–	11
West Division
UTSA xy$	7	–	1	12	–	2
UAB	6	–	2	9	–	4
North Texas	5	–	3	6	–	7
UTEP	4	–	4	7	–	6
Rice	3	–	5	4	–	8
Southern Miss	2	–	6	3	–	9
Louisiana Tech	2	–	6	3	–	9
Championship: UTSA 49, Western Kentucky 41
$ – Conference champion; x – Division champion/co-champions; y – Championship game participant

The 2021 Old Dominion Monarchs football team represented Old Dominion University during the 2021 NCAA Division I FBS football season. The Monarchs played their home games at S.B. Ballard Stadium in Norfolk, Virginia, and competed in the East Division of Conference USA (C-USA). The team was coached by second-year head coach Ricky Rahne.

On October 27, 2021, Old Dominion announced that this would be the last season for the team in C-USA, and they would join the Sun Belt Conference on July 1, 2022.

== Schedule ==
Old Dominion announced its 2021 football schedule on January 27, 2021. The 2021 schedule consisted of 6 home and 6 away games in the regular season.

Date	Time	Opponent	Site	TV	Result	Attendance
September 3	7:00 p.m.	at Wake Forest*	Truist Field; Winston-Salem, NC	ACCN	L 10–42	25,673
September 11	7:00 p.m.	Hampton*	S.B. Ballard Stadium; Norfolk, VA	ESPN3	W 47–7	18,363
September 18	6:00 p.m.	at Liberty*	Williams Stadium; Lynchburg, VA	ESPN3	L 17–45	18,471
September 25	6:00 p.m.	Buffalo*	S.B. Ballard Stadium; Norfolk, VA	ESPN+	L 34–35	18,197
October 2	9:00 p.m.	at UTEP	Sun Bowl; El Paso, TX	ESPN+	L 21–28	11,025
October 9	2:00 p.m.	at Marshall	Joan C. Edwards Stadium; Huntington, WV	CBSSN Facebook	L 13–20 ^{OT}	24,172
October 16	3:30 p.m.	Western Kentucky^{†}	S.B. Ballard Stadium; Norfolk, VA	ESPN3	L 20–43	16,418
October 30	3:30 p.m.	Louisiana Tech	S.B. Ballard Stadium; Norfolk, VA	CBSSN	W 23–20	13,309
November 6	7:00 p.m.	at FIU	Riccardo Silva Stadium; Miami, FL	ESPN3	W 47–24	0
November 13	3:30 p.m.	Florida Atlantic	S.B. Ballard Stadium; Norfolk, VA	ESPN+	W 30–16	13,634
November 20	3:30 p.m.	at Middle Tennessee	Johnny "Red" Floyd Stadium; Murfreesboro, TN	ESPN+	W 24–17	9,606
November 27	2:00 p.m.	Charlotte	S.B. Ballard Stadium; Norfolk, VA (Oyster Bowl)	ESPN+	W 56–34	15,874
December 20	2:30 pm	vs. Tulsa*	Brooks Stadium; Conway, South Carolina (Myrtle Beach Bowl)	ESPN	L 17–30	6,557
*Non-conference game; ^{†}Homecoming; Rankings from AP Poll and CFP Rankings released prior to game; All times are in Eastern time

== Game summaries ==
=== At Wake Forest ===
Old Dominion at Wake Forest

Team	1	2	3	4	Total
Monarchs	3	0	0	7	10
• Demon Deacons	14	14	7	7	42

- Date: September 3, 2021
- Location: Truist Field
  Winston-Salem, NC
- Game start: 7:03 p.m. EDT
- Elapsed time: 3 hours and 24 minutes
- Game attendance: 25,673
- Game weather: 79 °F (26 °C) • Weather: Sunny • Wind: NE 4 MPH
- Referee: Rodney Burnette
- TV announcers (ACC Network): Drew Carter (play–by–play), Forrest Conoly (analyst), and Abby Labar (sideline reporter)

Scoring summary
1	08:57	WF	Christian Beal-Smith 48-yard rush (Nick Sciba kick) (3 plays, 64 yards, 0:44)	WF 7–0
1	00:28	ODU	Nick Rice 38-yard field goal (6 plays, 35 yards, 2:56)	WF 7–3
1	00:12	WF	Ja'Sir Taylor 99-yard kickoff returned (Nick Sciba kick) (0 plays, 0 yards, 0:00)	WF 14–3
2	12:01	WF	A. T. Perry 36-yard pass from Sam Hartman (Nick Sciba kick) (4 plays, 48 yards, 1:10)	WF 21–3
2	02:45	WF	Jaquarii Roberson 2-yard pass from Sam Hartman (Nick Sciba kick) (9 plays, 49 yards, 3:51)	WF 28–3
3	08:44	WF	Christian Beal-Smith 1-yard rush (Nick Sciba kick) (8 plays, 56 yards, 2:39)	WF 35–3
4	12:50	WF	Ke'Shawn Williams 4-yard pass from Sam Hartman (Nick Sciba kick) (7 plays, 52 yards, 3:22)	WF 42–3
4	02:27	ODU	Isaiah Spencer 9-yard pass from Hayden Wolff (Nick Rice kick) (8 plays, 55 yards, 2:59)	WF 42–10

Statistics	ODU	WF
First downs	17	20
Total yards	272	352
Rushing yards	145	164
Passing yards	127	188
Turnovers	2	1
Time of possession	32:19	27:41

Team	Category	Player	Statistics
Old Dominion	Passing	Hayden Wolff	11/17, 88 yards, 1 TD
Old Dominion	Rushing	Elijah Davis	12 carries, 69 yards
Old Dominion	Receiving	Stone Smartt	3 receptions, 26 yards
Wake Forest	Passing	Sam Hartman	18/27, 188 yards, 3 TDs
Wake Forest	Rushing	Christian Beal-Smith	11 carries, 74 yards, 2 TDs
Wake Forest	Receiving	A. T. Perry	4 receptions, 81 yards, 1 TD

=== Hampton ===
Hampton at Old Dominion

Team	1	2	3	4	Total
Pirates	0	0	7	0	7
• Monarchs	10	24	7	6	47

- Date: September 11, 2021
- Location: S. B. Ballard Stadium
  Norfolk, VA
- Game start: 7:06 p.m. EDT
- Elapsed time: 3 hours and 15 minutes
- Game attendance: 18,363
- Game weather: Sunny
- Referee: Scott Hardin
- TV announcers (ESPN3): Ted Alexander (play–by–play) and Andy Mashew (analyst)

Scoring summary
1	09:22	ODU	Elijah Davis 15-yard rush (Nick Rice kick) (7 plays, 91 yards, 2:27)	ODU 7–0
1	04:55	ODU	Nick Rice 24-yard field goal (8 plays, 42 yards, 2:22)	ODU 10–0
2	14:10	ODU	D. J. Mack Jr. 13-yard rush (Nick Rice kick) (8 plays, 92 yards, 3:15)	ODU 17–0
2	09:32	ODU	Isaiah Spencer 2-yard pass from D. J. Mack Jr. (Nick Rice kick) (9 plays, 48 yards, 3:13)	ODU 24–0
2	03:15	ODU	D. J. Mack Jr. 3-yard rush (Nick Rice kick) (11 plays, 76 yards, 4:43)	ODU 31–0
2	00:00	ODU	Nick Rice 18-yard field goal (9 plays, 77 yards, 1:53)	ODU 34–0
3	07:00	ODU	D. J. Mack Jr. 4-yard rush (Nick Rice kick) (7 plays, 48 yards, 2:20)	ODU 41–0
3	04:20	HAMP	Jadakis Bonds 24-yard pass from Jett Duffey (Axel Perez kick) (7 plays, 75 yards, 2:40)	ODU 41–7
4	14:19	ODU	Nick Rice 23-yard field goal (12 plays, 70 yards, 5:01)	ODU 44–7
4	10:39	ODU	Nick Rice 33-yard field goal (5 plays, 26 yards, 1:51)	ODU 47–7

Statistics	HU	ODU
First downs	13	32
Total yards	187	572
Rushing yards	104	358
Passing yards	83	214
Turnovers	0	0
Time of possession	26:55	33:05

Team	Category	Player	Statistics
Hampton	Passing	Jett Duffey	7/16, 83 yards, 1 TD
Hampton	Rushing	Elijah Burris	12 carries, 45 yards
Hampton	Receiving	Jadakis Bonds	5 receptions, 68 yards, 1 TD
Old Dominion	Passing	D. J. Mack Jr.	11/22, 162 yards, 1 TD
Old Dominion	Rushing	Jon-Luke Peaker	18 carries, 141 yards
Old Dominion	Receiving	Zack Kuntz	3 receptions, 61 yards

=== At Liberty ===
Old Dominion at Liberty

Team	1	2	3	4	Total
Monarchs	3	14	0	0	17
• Flames	14	14	14	3	45

- Date: September 18, 2021
- Location: Williams Stadium
  Lynchburg, VA
- Game start: 6:06 p.m. EDT
- Elapsed time: 3 hours and 4 minutes
- Game attendance: 18,471
- Game weather: 86 °F (30 °C) • Weather: Cloudy • Wind: SE 2 MPH
- Referee: Jeff Flanagan
- TV announcers (ESPN3): Matt Warner (play–by–play), Joe Jauch (analyst), and Emily Austen (sideline reporter)

Scoring summary
1	11:25	LIB	CJ Daniels 14-yard pass from Malik Willis (Alex Barbir kick) (10 plays, 68 yards, 3:28)	LIB 7–0
1	03:17	LIB	Malik Willis 17-yard rush (Alex Barbir kick) (6 plays, 79 yards, 2:45)	LIB 14–0
1	00:46	ODU	Nick Rice 43-yard field goal (4 plays, 4 yards, 0:40)	LIB 14–3
2	13:23	LIB	CJ Daniels 33-yard pass from Malik Willis (Alex Barbir kick) (6 plays, 80 yards, 2:18)	LIB 21–3
2	06:29	ODU	Elijah Davis 1-yard rush (Nick Rice kick) (10 plays, 56 yards, 3:43)	LIB 21–10
2	03:48	LIB	Kevin Shaa 38-yard pass from Malik Willis (Alex Barbir kick) (7 plays, 60 yards, 2:31)	LIB 28–10
2	00:42	ODU	Zack Kuntz 30-yard pass from D. J. Mack Jr. (Nick Rice kick) (12 plays, 75 yards, 3:06)	LIB 28–17
3	11:10	LIB	Kevin Shaa 8-yard pass from Malik Willis (Alex Barbir kick) (4 plays, 48 yards, 2:00)	LIB 35–17
3	05:18	LIB	Malik Willis 1-yard rush (Alex Barbir kick) (10 plays, 60 yards, 3:17)	LIB 42–17
4	03:29	LIB	Alex Barbir 31-yard field goal (14 plays, 67 yards, 8:28)	LIB 45–17

Statistics	ODU	LIB
First downs	15	23
Total yards	201	424
Rushing yards	67	182
Passing yards	134	242
Turnovers	1	1
Time of possession	28:16	31:44

Team	Category	Player	Statistics
Old Dominion	Passing	D. J. Mack Jr.	15/27, 134 yards, 1 TD, 1 INT
Old Dominion	Rushing	Elijah Davis	11 carries, 57 yards, 1 TD
Old Dominion	Receiving	Zack Kuntz	4 receptions, 60 yards, 1 TD
Liberty	Passing	Malik Willis	21/28, 242 yards, 4 TDs
Liberty	Rushing	Malik Willis	9 carries, 77 yards, 2 TDs
Liberty	Receiving	CJ Daniels	5 receptions, 70 yards, 2 TDs

=== Buffalo ===
Buffalo at Old Dominion

Team	1	2	3	4	Total
• Bulls	7	28	0	0	35
Monarchs	7	0	14	13	34

- Date: September 25, 2021
- Location: S.B. Ballard Stadium
  Norfolk, VA
- Game start: 6:05 p.m. EDT
- Elapsed time: 3 hours and 53 minutes
- Game attendance: 18,197
- Game weather: 75 °F (24 °C) • Weather: Sunny
- Referee: Anthony Perez
- TV announcers (ESPN+): Ted Alexander (play–by–play) and Andy Mashaw (analyst)

Scoring summary
1	10:14	BUF	C. J. Bazile 85-yard blocked field goal returned (Alex McNulty kick) (4 plays, 7 yards, 3:16)	BUF 7–0
1	02:37	ODU	Blake Watson 2-yard rush (Nick Rice kick) (4 plays, 26 yards, 1:12)	TIE 7–7
2	13:49	BUF	Kyle Vantrease 4-yard rush (Alex McNulty kick) (9 plays, 74 yards, 3:42)	BUF 14–7
2	08:25	BUF	Quian Williams 13-yard pass from Kyle Vantrease (Alex McNulty kick) (8 plays, 91 yards, 3:38)	BUF 21–7
2	03:14	BUF	Dylan McDuffie 20-yard rush (Alex McNulty kick) (9 plays, 55 yards, 3:41)	BUF 28–7
2	02:07	BUF	Tim Terry Jr. 67-yard fumble returned (Alex McNulty kick) (3 plays, 42 yards, 1:07)	BUF 35–7
3	08:18	ODU	D. J. Mack Jr. 42-yard rush (Nick Rice kick) (8 plays, 47 yards, 3:15)	BUF 35–14
3	00:34	ODU	D. J. Mack Jr. 2-yard rush (Nick Rice kick) (11 plays, 85 yards, 5:07)	BUF 35–21
4	08:36	ODU	Jon-Luke Peaker 7-yard rush (Nick Rice kick) (5 plays, 63 yards, 1:48)	BUF 35–28
4	00:19	ODU	Zack Kuntz 19-yard pass from D. J. Mack Jr. (Nick Rice PAT failed) (10 plays, 46 yards, 2:44)	BUF 35–34

Statistics	BUF	ODU
First downs	17	27
Total yards	297	433
Rushing yards	106	209
Passing yards	191	224
Turnovers	1	3
Time of possession	37:32	22:28

Team	Category	Player	Statistics
Buffalo	Passing	Kyle Vantrease	17/26, 191 yards, 1 TD
Buffalo	Rushing	Dylan McDuffie	16 carries, 59 yards, 1 TD
Buffalo	Receiving	Quian Williams	9 receptions, 134 yards, 1 TD
Old Dominion	Passing	D. J. Mack Jr.	24/41, 224 yards, 1 TD, 1 INT
Old Dominion	Rushing	D. J. Mack Jr.	18 carries, 84 yards, 2 TDs
Old Dominion	Receiving	Ali Jennings III	7 receptions, 68 yards

=== At UTEP ===
Old Dominion at Texas–El Paso

Team	1	2	3	4	Total
Monarchs	0	7	14	0	21
• Miners	3	14	3	8	28

- Date: October 2, 2021
- Location: Sun Bowl
  El Paso, TX
- Game start: 9:05 p.m. EDT
- Elapsed time: 3 hours and 9 minutes
- Game attendance: 11,025
- Game weather: 79 °F (26 °C) • Weather: Sunny • Wind: N 2 MPH
- Referee: Rodney Burnette
- TV announcers (ESPN+): Erik Elken (play–by–play) and Trevor Vittatoe (analyst)

Scoring summary
1	09:55	UTEP	Gavin Baechle 29-yard field goal (7 plays, 33 yards, 3:24)	UTEP 3–0
2	11:08	UTEP	Justin Garrett 7-yard pass from Gavin Hardison (Gavin Baechle kick) (16 plays, 80 yards, 8:10)	UTEP 10–0
2	00:51	UTEP	Tyrin Smith 7-yard pass from Gavin Hardison (Gavin Baechle kick) (15 plays, 87 yards, 8:06)	UTEP 17–0
2	00:10	ODU	Ali Jennings III 20-yard pass from D. J. Mack Jr. (Nick Rice kick) (8 plays, 75 yards, 0:41)	UTEP 17–7
3	11:37	UTEP	Gavin Baechle 40-yard field goal (8 plays, 64 yards, 3:19)	UTEP 20–7
3	05:27	ODU	D. J. Mack Jr. 5-yard rush (Nick Rice kick) (19 plays, 75 yards, 6:10)	UTEP 20–14
3	04:27	ODU	AC White 11-yard punt returned (Nick Rice kick) (5 plays, 72 yards, 0:55)	ODU 21–20
4	06:59	UTEP	Deion Hankins 3-yard rush (Gavin Hardison two-point conversion pass to Justin Garrett) (9 plays, 63 yards, 4:47)	UTEP 28–21

Statistics	ODU	UTEP
First downs	19	17
Total yards	282	333
Rushing yards	88	142
Passing yards	194	191
Turnovers	2	0
Time of possession	25:32	34:28

Team	Category	Player	Statistics
Old Dominion	Passing	D. J. Mack Jr.	20/34, 194 yards, 1 TD, 1 INT
Old Dominion	Rushing	Blake Watson	13 carries, 35 yards
Old Dominion	Receiving	Zack Kuntz	8 receptions, 54 yards
UTEP	Passing	Gavin Hardison	10/20, 191 yards, 2 TDs
UTEP	Rushing	Deion Hankins	23 carries, 75 yards, 1 TD
UTEP	Receiving	Jacob Cowing	4 receptions, 118 yards

=== At Marshall ===
Old Dominion at Marshall

Team	1	2	3	4	OT	Total
Monarchs	7	3	0	3	0	13
• Thundering Herd	3	3	0	7	7	20

- Date: October 9, 2021
- Location: Joan C. Edwards Stadium
  Huntington, WV
- Game start: 2:04 p.m. EDT
- Elapsed time: 3 hours and 7 minutes
- Game attendance: 24,172
- Game weather: 79 °F (26 °C) • Weather: Sunny • Wind: None
- Referee: Jonathan Noli
- TV announcers (CBS Sports Network): Chris Hassel (play–by–play) and Ben Leber (analyst)

Scoring summary
1	03:59	MAR	Shane Ciucci 42-yard field goal (4 plays, -6 yards, 1:21)	MAR 3–0
1	00:25	ODU	Ali Jennings III 33-yard pass from D. J. Mack Jr. (Nick Rice kick) (9 plays, 81 yards, 3:34)	ODU 7–3
2	06:38	ODU	Nick Rice 47-yard field goal (13 plays, 73 yards, 5:48)	ODU 10–3
2	00:25	MAR	Shane Ciucci 22-yard field goal (14 plays, 76 yards, 6:13)	ODU 10–6
4	02:37	ODU	Nick Rice 45-yard field goal (10 plays, 32 yards, 5:05)	ODU 13–6
4	00:33	MAR	Willie Johnson 52-yard pass from Grant Wells (Shane Ciucci kick) (8 plays, 75 yards, 2:04)	TIE 13–13
1OT		MAR	Shadeed Ahmed 22-yard pass from Grant Wells (Shane Ciucci kick)	MAR 20–13

Statistics	ODU	MAR
First downs	19	24
Total yards	314	390
Rushing yards	208	91
Passing yards	106	299
Turnovers	2	2
Time of possession	29:56	30:04

Team	Category	Player	Statistics
Old Dominion	Passing	D. J. Mack Jr.	9/22, 106 yards, 1 TD, 2 INTs
Old Dominion	Rushing	Blake Watson	26 carries, 168 yards
Old Dominion	Receiving	Ali Jennings III	1 reception, 33 yards, 1 TD
Marshall	Passing	Grant Wells	30/46, 299 yards, 2 TDs, 2 INTs
Marshall	Rushing	Rasheen Ali	21 carries, 77 yards
Marshall	Receiving	Shadeed Ahmed	7 receptions, 77 yards, 1 TD

=== Western Kentucky ===
Western Kentucky at Old Dominion

Team	1	2	3	4	Total
• Hilltoppers	14	16	3	10	43
Monarchs	0	3	3	14	20

- Date: October 16, 2021
- Location: S.B. Ballard Stadium
  Norfolk, VA
- Game start: 3:35 p.m. EDT
- Elapsed time: 3 hours and 20 minutes
- Game attendance: 16,418
- Game weather: 82 °F (28 °C) • Weather: Sunny
- Referee: Kevin Vicknair
- Television network: ESPN3

Scoring summary
1	09:16	WKU	Malachi Corley 26-yard pass from Bailey Zappe (Brayden Narveson kick) (8 plays, 68 yards, 3:42)	WKU 7–0
1	04:24	WKU	Dakota Thomas 9-yard pass from Bailey Zappe (Brayden Narveson kick) (12 plays, 81 yards, 3:30)	WKU 14–0
2	05:23	WKU	Daewood Davis 15-yard pass from Bailey Zappe (Brayden Narveson kick) (3 plays, 41 yards, 1:02)	WKU 21–0
2	02:23	ODU	Nick Rice 44-yard field goal (10 plays, 48 yards, 3:00)	WKU 21–3
2	01:48	WKU	Jerreth Sterens 74-yard pass from Bailey Zappe (Brayden Narveson kick) (3 plays, 75 yards, 0:35)	WKU 27–3
2	00:00	WKU	Brayden Narveson 20-yard field goal (8 plays, 45 yards, 1:16)	WKU 30–3
3	10:37	ODU	Nick Rice 38-yard field goal (11 plays, 54 yards, 4:23)	WKU 30–6
3	03:43	WKU	Brayden Narveson 31-yard field goal (4 plays, -9 yards, 1:30)	WKU 33–6
4	14:55	ODU	Elijah Davis 24-yard rush (Nick Rice kick) (8 plays, 79 yards, 3:45)	WKU 33–13
4	10:17	ODU	Blake Watson 7-yard rush (Nick Rice kick) (8 plays, 78 yards, 3:02)	WKU 33–20
4	05:41	WKU	Brayden Narveson 41-yard field goal (13 plays, 42 yards, 4:31)	WKU 36–20
4	03:51	WKU	Dakota Thomas 17-yard pass from Bailey Zappe (Brayden Narveson kick) (2 plays, 23 yards, 0:38)	WKU 43–20

Statistics	WKU	ODU
First downs	29	23
Total yards	518	446
Rushing yards	121	119
Passing yards	397	327
Turnovers	1	3
Time of possession	30:39	29:21

Team	Category	Player	Statistics
Western Kentucky	Passing	Bailey Zappe	36/54, 397 yards, 5 TDs, 1 INT
Western Kentucky	Rushing	Adam Cofield	10 carries, 67 yards
Western Kentucky	Receiving	Jerreth Sterns	13 receptions, 221 yards, 1 TD
Old Dominion	Passing	Hayden Wolff	26/41, 327 yards, 2 INTs
Old Dominion	Rushing	Blake Watson	22 carries, 104 yards, 1 TD
Old Dominion	Receiving	Ali Jennings III	13 receptions, 172 yards

=== Louisiana Tech ===
Louisiana Tech at Old Dominion

Team	1	2	3	4	Total
Bulldogs	0	10	3	7	20
• Monarchs	0	10	7	6	23

- Date: October 30, 2021
- Location: S.B. Ballard Stadium
  Norfolk, VA
- Game start: 3:32 p.m. EDT
- Elapsed time: 3 hours and 39 minutes
- Game attendance: 13,309
- Game weather: 66 °F (19 °C) • Weather: Sunny
- Referee: Jonathan Noli
- TV announcers (CBS Sports Network): Chris Hassel (play–by–play) and Sed Bonner (analyst)

Scoring summary
2	03:56	ODU	Nick Rice 36-yard field goal (8 plays, 49 yards, 4:15)	ODU 3–0
2	01:13	LT	Isaiah Graham 32-yard pass from Austin Kendall (Jacob Barnes kick) (7 plays, 80 yards, 2:39)	LT 7–3
2	00:58	ODU	LeMareon James 100-yard kickoff returned (Nick Rice kick) (6 plays, 66 yards, 0:49)	ODU 10–7
2	00:03	LT	Jacob Barnes 30-yard field goal (6 plays, 66 yards, 0:49)	TIE 10–10
3	10:19	ODU	Zack Kuntz 5-yard pass from Hayden Wolff (Nick Rice kick) (9 plays, 55 yards, 3:02)	ODU 17–10
3	06:51	LT	Jacob Barnes 44-yard field goal (7 plays, 13 yards, 3:18)	ODU 17–13
4	12:01	LT	Marcus Williams Jr. 7-yard rush (Jacob Barnes kick) (5 plays, 43 yards, 0:39)	LT 20–17
4	01:52	ODU	Nick Rice 29-yard field goal (20 plays, 58 yards, 10:02)	TIE 20–20
4	00:00	ODU	Nick Rice 46-yard field goal (5 plays, 26 yards, 0:28)	ODU 23–20

Statistics	LT	ODU
First downs	15	20
Total yards	335	311
Rushing yards	59	162
Passing yards	276	149
Turnovers	0	2
Time of possession	24:21	35:39

Team	Category	Player	Statistics
Louisiana Tech	Passing	Austin Kendall	22/36, 253 yards, 1 TD
Louisiana Tech	Rushing	Marcus Williams Jr.	14 carries, 42 yards, 1 TD
Louisiana Tech	Receiving	Smoke Harris	7 receptions, 63 yards
Old Dominion	Passing	Hayden Wolff	23/34, 149 yards, 1 TD, 1 INT
Old Dominion	Rushing	Blake Watson	28 carries, 108 yards
Old Dominion	Receiving	Zack Kuntz	8 receptions, 67 yards, 1 TD

=== At FIU ===
Old Dominion at Florida International

Team	1	2	3	4	Total
• Monarchs	24	0	6	17	47
Panthers	10	0	7	7	24

- Date: November 6, 2021
- Location: FIU Stadium
  Miami, FL
- Game start: 7:05 p.m. EDT
- Elapsed time: 3 hours and 40 minutes
- Game attendance: 0
- Game weather: 72 °F (22 °C) • Weather: Sunny
- Referee: Jonathan Noil
- Television network: ESPN3

Statistics	ODU	FIU
First downs	29	19
Total yards	565	435
Rushing yards	282	107
Passing yards	283	328
Turnovers	2	2
Time of possession	31:49	28:11

Team	Category	Player	Statistics
Old Dominion	Passing	Hayden Wolff	22/42, 283 yards, 2 TD, 1 INT
Old Dominion	Rushing	Blake Watson	28 rushes, 158 yards, 2 TD
Old Dominion	Receiving	Zack Kuntz	9 receptions, 102 yards, 1 TD
FIU	Passing	Max Bortenschlager	18/32, 315 yards, 2 TD, 1 INT
FIU	Rushing	Lexington Joseph	11 rushes, 54 yards
FIU	Receiving	Bryce Singleton	6 receptions, 199 yards, 2 TD

=== Florida Atlantic ===
Florida Atlantic at Old Dominion

Team	1	2	3	4	Total
Owls	3	0	7	6	16
• Monarchs	2	9	6	13	30

- Date: November 13, 2021
- Location: S.B. Ballard Stadium
  Norfolk, VA
- Game start: 3:36 p.m. EDT
- Elapsed time: 3 hours and 39 minutes
- Game attendance: 13,634
- Game weather: 64 °F (18 °C) • Weather: Sunny
- Referee: Kevin Vicknair
- Television network: ESPN+

Statistics	FAU	ODU
First downs	13	22
Total yards	308	447
Rushing yards	121	158
Passing yards	187	289
Turnovers	2	2
Time of possession	22:28	37:21

Team	Category	Player	Statistics
Florida Atlantic	Passing	N'Kosi Perry	12/21, 187 yards, 1 TD
Florida Atlantic	Rushing	Johnny Ford	19 rushes, 101 yards, 1 TD
Florida Atlantic	Receiving	Brandon Robinson	1 reception, 59 yards, 1 TD
Old Dominion	Passing	Hayden Wolff	21/33, 289 yards, 1 TD
Old Dominion	Rushing	Blake Watson	23 rushes, 163 yards, 1 TD
Old Dominion	Receiving	Ali Jennings III	4 receptions, 99 yards

=== At Middle Tennessee ===
Old Dominion at Middle Tennessee

Team	1	2	3	4	Total
• Monarchs	7	3	0	14	24
Blue Raiders	7	3	0	7	17

- Date: November 20, 2021
- Location: Johnny "Red" Floyd Stadium
  Murfreesboro, TN
- Game start: 3:35 p.m. EDT
- Elapsed time: 3 hours and 12 minutes
- Game attendance: 9,606
- Game weather: 59 °F (15 °C) • Weather: Sunny • Wind: S 10 MPH
- Referee: Ed Ardito
- Television network: ESPN+

Statistics	ODU	MTSU
First downs	11	25
Total yards	341	414
Rushing yards	100	101
Passing yards	241	313
Turnovers	0	2
Time of possession	24:55	35:05

Team	Category	Player	Statistics
Old Dominion	Passing	Hayden Wolff	15/24, 241 yards, 2 TD
Old Dominion	Rushing	Blake Watson	18 rushes, 57 yards
Old Dominion	Receiving	Ali Jennings III	4 receptions, 146 yards
Middle Tennessee	Passing	Nicholas Vattiato	31/45, 281 yards, 1 TD, 1 INT
Middle Tennessee	Rushing	Martell Pettaway	13 rushes, 57 yards
Middle Tennessee	Receiving	Jaylin Lane	10 receptions, 107 yards, 1 TD

=== Charlotte ===
Charlotte at Old Dominion

Team	1	2	3	4	Total
49ers	0	14	14	6	34
• Monarchs	14	14	7	21	56

- Date: November 27, 2021
- Location: S.B. Ballard Stadium
  Norfolk, VA
- Game start: 2:05 p.m. EDT
- Elapsed time: 3 hours and 48 minutes
- Game attendance: 15,874
- Game weather: 45 °F (7 °C) • Weather: Sunny • Wind: 0 MPH
- Referee: Kevin Randall
- TV announcers (ESPN+): Ted Alexander, Andy Mashaw, James Witham

Scoring summary
1	09:15	ODU	Nick Saldiveri 0-yard run (Nick Rice kick) (2 plays, 2 yards, 0:34)	ODU 7-0
1	02:51	ODU	Elijah Davis 12-yard run (Nick Rice kick) (8 plays, 64 yards, 2:10)	ODU 14-0
2	12:11	ODU	Ali Jennings III 46-yard pass from Hayden Wolff (Nick Rice kick) (3 plays, 63 yards, 0:58)	ODU 21-0
2	10:45	CHAR	Elijah Spencer 19-yard pass from Chris Reynolds (Jonathan Cruz kick) (4 plays, 63 yards, 1:21)	ODU 21-7
2	07:40	ODU	Ali Jennings III 34-yard pass from Hayden Wolff (Nick Rice kick) (7 plays, 75 yards, 3:05)	ODU 28-7
2	02:59	CHAR	Luke Martin 8-yard interception return (Jonathan Cruz kick)	ODU 28-14
3	10:49	CHAR	Grant Dubose 9-yard pass from Chris Reynolds (Jonathan Cruz kick) (5 plays, 75 yards, 1:57)	ODU 28-21
3	06:06	CHAR	Calvin Camp 6-yard run (Jonathan Cruz kick) (7 plays, 56 yards, 2:59)	TIED 28-28
3	03:25	ODU	Blake Watson 3-yard run (Nick Rice kick) (6 plays, 74 yards, 2:35)	ODU 35-28
4	13:09	CHAR	Jonathan Cruz 39-yard field goal (12 plays, 52 yards, 5:11)	ODU 35-31
4	10:04	CHAR	Jonathan Cruz 44-yard field goal (7 plays, 13 yards, 2:14)	ODU 35-34
4	06:42	ODU	Blake Watson 2-yard run (Nick Rice kick) (7 plays, 75 yards, 3:22)	ODU 42-34
4	03:49	ODU	Ali Jennings III 36-yard pass from Hayden Wolff (Nick Rice kick) (4 plays, 41 yards, 1:45)	ODU 49-34
4	02:52	ODU	Deeve Harris 1-yard fumble return (Nick Rice kick)	ODU 56-34

Statistics	CHAR	ODU
First downs	26	22
Total yards	480	441
Rushing yards	203	113
Passing yards	277	328
Turnovers	4	2
Time of possession	36:11	23:49

Team	Category	Player	Statistics
Charlotte	Passing	Chris Reynolds	24/40, 231 yards, 2 TD, 2 INT
Charlotte	Rushing	Calvin Camp	16 rushes, 90 yards, 1 TD
Charlotte	Receiving	Grant DuBose	9 receptions, 94 yards, 1 TD
Old Dominion	Passing	Hayden Wolff	17/26, 328 yards, 3 TD, 2 INT
Old Dominion	Rushing	Blake Watson	18 rushes, 106 yards, 2 TD
Old Dominion	Receiving	Ali Jennings III	9 receptions, 252 yards, 3 TD

=== Vs. Tulsa (Myrtle Beach Bowl) ===
Old Dominion vs. Tulsa Golden Hurricane (Myrtle Beach Bowl)

Team	1	2	3	4	Total
Monarchs	7	3	0	7	17
• Golden Hurricane	14	3	6	7	30

- Date: December 20, 2021
- Location: Brooks Stadium
  Conway, SC
- Game start: 2:35 p.m. EDT
- Elapsed time: 3 hours and 35 minutes
- Game attendance: 6,557
- Game weather: 47 °F (8 °C) • Weather: Sunny
- Referee: Cal McNeill
- TV announcers (ESPN): Mike Corey (play-by-play), Hutson Mason (analyst), Marty Smith and Ryan McGee (sideline)

Scoring summary
1	14:46	ODU	LaMareon James 100-yard kickoff return for a touchdown (Nick Rice kick)	ODU 7-0
1	13:03	TUL	Shamari Brooks 1-yard run (Zack Long kick) (7 plays, 74 yards, 1:42)	TIED 7-7
1	04:47	TUL	Josh Johnson 23-yard reception from Davis Brin (Zack Long kick) (11 plays, 76 yards, 3:46)	TUL 14-7
2	12:50	ODU	Nick Rice 32-yard field goal (9 plays, 38 yards, 3:12)	TUL 14-10
2	00:09	TU	Zack Long 35-yard field goal (12 plays, 52 yards, 3:24)	TUL 17-10
3	08:38	TUL	Zack Long 25-yard field goal (15 plays, 70 yards, 6:17)	TUL 20-10
3	03:25	TUL	Zack Long 32-yard field goal (11 plays, 53 yards, 3:54)	TUL 23-10
4	09:04	TUL	Ethan Hall 4-yard reception from Davis Brin (Zack Long kick) (11 plays, 80 yards, 3:57)	TUL 30-10
4	07:15	ODU	Blake Watson 2-yard run (Nick Rice kick) (5 plays, 60 yards, 1:43)	TUL 30-17

Statistics

Statistics	ODU	TUL
First downs	10	35
Total yards	247	529
Rushing yards	71	244
Passing yards	176	285
Turnovers	2	0
Time of possession	20:17	39:43

Team	Category	Player	Statistics
Old Dominion	Passing	Hayden Wolff	19/28, 176 yards, 1 INT
Old Dominion	Rushing	Blake Watson	14 rushes, 77 yards, 1 TD
Old Dominion	Receiving	Ali Jennings III	6 receptions, 74 yards
Tulsa	Passing	Davis Brin	22/34, 285 yards, 2 TD
Tulsa	Rushing	Shamari Brooks	26 rushes, 107 yards, 1 TD
Tulsa	Receiving	Josh Johnson	8 receptions, 129 yards, 1 TD

== Roster ==
2021 Old Dominion Monarchs football team roster
Players
Coaches
Offense

Pos.	#	Name	Class
WR	1	Jordan Bly	Fr
RB	2	Blake Watson	So
WR	3	Frederik Antoine	Fr
QB	4	Stone Smartt	Sr
WR	5	Darius Savedge	So
WR	6	Nigel Fitzgerald	So
QB	7	Reese Poffenbarger	Fr
QB	8	D.J. Mack Jr.	Jr
WR	9	Trey Blount	Jr
WR	10	Isiah Paige	Fr
QB	11	Hayden Wolff	Fr
RB	12	Elijah Davis	So
WR	13	MarQeese Dietz	Fr
QB	14	Dominique Anthony	Fr
WR	16	Aaron Moore	So
QB	17	Jack Shields	Fr
WR	18	Javon Harvey	Fr
WR	19	Cornell Hendrick Jr	So
RB	20	Keshawn Wicks	Fr
RB	21	Jon-Luke Peaker	Fr
WR	23	Noah Robinson	Fr
RB	26	Tariq Sims	Fr
RB	29	Obie Sanni	Fr
WR	30	Rafael McCoy	Fr
RB	44	Matt Geiger	Jr
RB	46	Elijah Rivers	Fr
OL	53	Khadere Kounta	So
OL	58	Stephon Dubose-Bourne	Fr
OL	60	Joshua Bennett	Fr
OL	62	Tyler Lamar	Fr
OL	63	Xavier Black	Fr
OL	64	Nick Saldiveri	So
OL	65	Chris Adams	Fr
OL	66	Andrew Blanton	Fr
OL	67	Tyran Hunt	Jr
OL	68	Caleb Gosney	Fr
OL	68	Brandon Ruff	Fr
OL	70	Jack Hassard	So
OL	70	Drew Pascoe	Fr
OL	71	Isaac Weaver	Sr
OL	72	Talyn Hunter	Fr
OL	73	Austin Mosier	Fr
OL	74	Santana Saunders	Fr
OL	75	Skyler Grant	Fr
OL	76	Jack Miller III	Jr
OL	77	Gerrik Vollmer	Jr
OL	77	Kyle Young	So
OL	78	Elijah Hoskin	Fr
OL	79	Leroy Thomas	So
TE	80	Zach Kuntz	So
WR	81	Devin Lester	Fr
TE	82	AC White	So
TE	83	Isaiah Spencer	So
TE	84	Donta Anthony Jr.	Jr
TE	85	Trey Lancaster	Fr
TE	86	Avery Ford	Fr
WR	87	Braxton Collins	Fr
TE	88	Curtis Nixon II	Fr

Defense

Pos.	#	Name	Class
LB	0	Malcolm Britt	Fr
CB	1	Lance Boykin	Jr
LB	3	Jordan Young	Sr
CB	4	LaMareon James	Fr
CB	5	Will Brocchini	Sr
CB	6	Tre Hawkins	Jr
S	7	Harrell Blackmon	Sr
LB	8	Ryan Henry	Jr
DE	9	Marcus Haynes	Jr
S	11	Levi Wentz	Fr
S	12	Tahj Ra-El	Fr
S	13	Terry Jones	Fr
S	14	Justinn Richardson	Jr
S	15	Tyrik McDaniel	Fr
CB	16	Khian'Dre Harris	Fr
CB	17	Damion Charity	So
DE	19	Amorie Morrison	Fr
CB	20	Roger Cray	Sr
DT	20	Aaron Jackson	Sr
S	21	R'Tarriun Johnson	Jr
CB	22	Kaleb Ford-Dement	Jr
CB	22	Jalen McCain	Fr
CB	23	Geronda Hall	Jr
S	23	Robert Kennedy III	Jr
S	24	Joe Joe Headen	Sr
LB	25	Steven Williams	Jr
CB	26	Jalen Lomax	Fr
S	27	Jahaad Scales	Fr
S	28	Corey Chapman	Fr
DE	29	Adrian Spellman	Fr
DE	31	Deeve Harris	Fr
LB	32	Joshua Burdsall	Fr
CB	33	Elijah Rivers	Fr
CB	34	Ali Ali	Fr
LB	34	John Cook	Fr
S	35	Luke Lindenfeldar	Fr
LB	36	Alec Solano	So
S	38	Colten Hicks	Fr
DE	39	Roman Ridley	Fr
LB	40	EJ Green	Fr
DE	41	Cory Jackson	Sr
LB	42	Jason Henderson	Fr
DE	43	Kris Trinidad	Fr
DT	45	Denzel Lowry	Fr
CB	46	Alhaji Kamara	Fr
LB	47	Wayne Matthews III	Fr
LB	48	Estefano Feliciano Jr.	Jr
DT	50	Alonzo Ford Jr.	Fr
DT	51	Carson Ramos	Jr
DT	52	Chazz Wallace	Fr
DT	54	Jeremy Meiser	Sr
DT	55	Keyshawn Hunter	Fr
DT	56	Sokoya McDuffie	So
DT	59	Will Daniel	Fr
DE	76	Keshawn Lynch	Fr
DE	89	Kris Caine	Fr
DE	90	Taevion Clarke	Fr
DE	94	O'Shea Jackson	So
DT	97	Devin Brandt-Epps	Fr
DT	99	Tyre Bibby	Jr

Special teams

Pos.	#	Name	Class
K	37	Dominik Soos	Jr
LS	43	Bryant Worrell	Fr
LS	49	John Morton	Fr
LS	91	B.R. Hatcher	Jr
LS	93	Anthony Zaccaro	Fr
P	95	Ethan Dunne	Fr
K, P	96	Broc Simpson	Fr
K	98	Nick Rice	Sr

Head coach

- Ricky Rahne

Coordinators/assistant coaches

- Kirk Campbell
  Offensive coordinator/quarterbacks
- Blake Seiler
  Defensive coordinator/inside linebackers
- Tony Lucas
  Running backs
- Jonathan Decoster
  Tight ends
- Mark Dupuis
  Wide receivers
- Kevin Reihner
  Offensive line
- Leon Wright
  Cornerbacks
- Remington Rebstock
  Safeties
- Kevin Smith
  Special teams coordinator/outside linebackers

Legend

- (C) Team captain
- (S) Suspended
- (I) Ineligible
- Injured
- Redshirt

Roster
Last update: March 9, 2024
