= 2021 FIU Panthers football team =

American college football season

2021 FIU Panthers football
- Conference: Conference USA
- East Division
- Record: 1–11 (0–8 C-USA)
- Head coach: Butch Davis (5th season)
- Offensive coordinator: Andrew Breiner (1st season)
- Offensive scheme: Spread
- Defensive coordinator: Everett Withers (1st season)
- Base defense: Multiple
- Home stadium: Riccardo Silva Stadium

2021 Conference USA football standings
	Conf.			Overall
Team	W		L	W		L
East Division
Western Kentucky xy	7	–	1	9	–	5
Marshall	5	–	3	7	–	6
Old Dominion	5	–	3	6	–	7
Middle Tennessee	4	–	4	7	–	6
Florida Atlantic	3	–	5	5	–	7
Charlotte	3	–	5	5	–	7
FIU	0	–	8	1	–	11
West Division
UTSA xy$	7	–	1	12	–	2
UAB	6	–	2	9	–	4
North Texas	5	–	3	6	–	7
UTEP	4	–	4	7	–	6
Rice	3	–	5	4	–	8
Southern Miss	2	–	6	3	–	9
Louisiana Tech	2	–	6	3	–	9
Championship: UTSA 49, Western Kentucky 41
$ – Conference champion; x – Division champion/co-champions; y – Championship game participant

The 2021 FIU Panthers football team represented Florida International University (FIU) in the 2021 NCAA Division I FBS football season. The Panthers played their home games at Riccardo Silva Stadium in Miami, Florida, and competed in the East Division of Conference USA (C-USA). They were led by fifth-year head coach Butch Davis.

The season was marred by drama and controversy, with athletic director Pete Garcia clearing his desk out in the middle of the night, with no prior announcement or news conference. A few days later, it was announced that head coach Butch Davis would not be returning following the season. Davis alleged that university administrators had cut the football program's budget by $500,000 each year for the past two years and that coaches were not allowed to recruit on the road. University administrators have not commented on Davis's allegations.

== Preseason ==
=== C-USA media days ===
The Panthers were predicted to finish in sixth place in the East Division in the Conference USA preseason poll.

Media poll (East Division)
Predicted finish	Team
1	Marshall
2	Florida Atlantic
3	Western Kentucky
4	Charlotte
5	Middle Tennessee
6	FIU
7	Old Dominion

== Schedule ==
Date	Time	Opponent	Site	TV	Result	Attendance
September 2	8:00 p.m.	LIU*	Riccardo Silva Stadium; Miami, FL	ESPN3	W 48–10	0
September 11	7:00 p.m.	Texas State*	Riccardo Silva Stadium; Miami, FL	ESPN+	L 17–23 ^{OT}	0
September 18	7:00 p.m.	at Texas Tech*	Jones AT&T Stadium; Lubbock, TX	ESPN+	L 21–54	50,118
September 25	12:00 p.m.	at Central Michigan*	Kelly/Shorts Stadium; Mount Pleasant, MI	ESPN+	L 27–31	18,382
October 2	3:30 p.m.	at Florida Atlantic	FAU Stadium; Boca Raton, FL (Shula Bowl)	Stadium	L 21–58	24,726
October 8	7:00 p.m.	Charlotte	Riccardo Silva Stadium; Miami, FL	CBSSN	L 33–45	0
October 23	7:00 p.m.	Western Kentucky^{†}	Riccardo Silva Stadium; Miami, FL	ESPN+	L 19–34	0
October 30	3:30 p.m.	at Marshall	Joan C. Edwards Stadium; Huntington, WV	Stadium	L 0–38	18,466
November 6	7:00 p.m.	Old Dominion	Riccardo Silva Stadium; Miami, FL	ESPN3	L 24–47	0
November 13	3:30 p.m.	at Middle Tennessee	Johnny "Red" Floyd Stadium; Murfreesboro, TN	ESPN3	L 10–50	10,606
November 20	7:00 p.m.	North Texas	Riccardo Silva Stadium; Miami, FL	ESPN3	L 7–49	0
November 27	3:00 p.m.	at Southern Miss	M. M. Roberts Stadium; Hattiesburg, MS	ESPN+	L 17–37	20,041
*Non-conference game; ^{†}Homecoming; Rankings from AP Poll released prior to the game; All times are in Eastern time

== Personnel ==
2021 FIU Panthers football team roster
Players
Coaches
Offense

Pos.	#	Name	Class
WR	0	Tyrese Chambers	So
WR	1	Shemar Thornton	Sr
WR	2	Bryce Singleton	Jr
RB	3	Shaun Peterson Jr.	So
QB	4	Haden Carlson	Fr
WR	6	Nate Jefferson	Fr
QB	7	Kaylan Wiggins	Jr
RB	8	Lexington Josepg	So
WR	9	Artez Hooker	Fr
QB	10	Grayson James	Fr
QB	11	Isaiah Velez	Fr
QB	12	Max Bortenschlager	Sr
TE	13	Rivaldo Fairweather	Fr
TE	14	Joe Hocker	Fr
WR	15	Teddy Richardson	Fr
WR	16	Randall St. Felix	Jr
WR	17	Caleb Lynum	So
WR	18	Jay Barry Jr.	Fr
TE	19	Daniel Pilgrim	Fr
RB	20	Kejon Owens	Fr
RB	21	E. J. Wilson Jr.	Fr
RB	24	D'Vonte Price	Sr
RB	32	Maleek Williams	Jr
WR	34	Ross Fornut	Fr
RB	38	Hosea Robinson	Fr
OL	51	Dontae Keys	Sr
OL	54	Kristoff Pollas	Fr
OL	58	Api Mane	Sr
OL	59	Wyatt Lawson	Fr
OL	63	Noah Quier	Fr
OL	65	Julius Pierce	Fr
OL	66	Jahmari Sylvester	Fr
OL	67	Jake Aguirre	Fr
OL	68	Sebastian Laraque	Fr
OL	69	Ming Tjon	Fr
OL	70	Miles Frazier	Fr
OL	72	Sione Finau	So
OL	74	Rey Bennett	So
OL	77	Lyndell Hudson Jr.	So
OL	78	Shamar Hobdy-Lee	Fr
OL	79	Logan Gunderson	Jr
WR	80	Kris Mitchell	Fr
WR	81	Dean Patterson	Fr
WR	82	Jordan Underwood	So
WR	83	Carson Kaleo	Jr
TE	84	David O'Meara	Jr
TE	85	Jackson McDonald	Fr
TE	87	Kamareon Williams	So
TE	88	Sterling Palmer	Jr

Defense

Pos.	#	Name	Class
DB	0	Dorian Hall	Jr
LB	2	Eric Mitchell	Sr
DB	3	Richard Dames	Sr
DB	4	Rishard Dames	Jr
DL	5	Kevin Oliver	Sr
DB	7	Josh Valentine-Turner	Jr
LB	9	Jamal Gates	Sr
LB	10	Daniel Jackson	Sr
LB	11	Josh Powell	Sr
DB	15	Pierce Withers	Jr
DB	18	Demarcus Robinson	Sr
DB	19	Deuce Dunbar	Fr
DB	22	Benny McCray	Jr
DB	23	Andrew Volmar	Fr
DB	27	Henry Gray	Fr
DB	29	Jamal Potts	Fr
DB	30	Joe Perkins	Fr
LB	33	Nasir Carter	Fr
LB	34	Chance Coleman	Fr
LB	36	Ah'Mahri McCray	Fr
DB	39	Brian Blades	Fr
DB	40	Demetrius Hill	Fr
DB	41	D'Mor Jean-Baptiste	Fr
LB	42	Reggie Peterson	Fr
DB	43	Jabril Muhammad	Fr
LB	44	A. J. Mathis	Fr
LB	45	Rocky Jacques-Louis	Jr
DB	47	Gio Richardson	Fr
LB	48	Gaethan Bernadel	Fr
DL	49	Shykieim Pace	Fr
LB	52	Donovan Georges	So
DL	53	Tevin Jones	Jr
LB	55	Baba Conate	Jr
LB	56	Tamarick Best	Fr
DL	57	Nick Donahue	Fr
DL	60	Clayton Senior III	Fr
LB	61	Joey Maya	Fr
DL	75	Rashad Colson	Jr
DL	86	Keegan Davis	Fr
DL	89	Ty Danzy	Fr
DL	90	Travonte O'Neal	Fr
DL	91	Jeramy Passmore	Fr
DL	92	Jason Mercier	Jr
DL	93	Jordan Guerad	Fr
DL	95	Jeremy Moore	So
DL	96	David Reynolds	So
DL	98	Savion Collins	Fr
DL	99	Davon Strickland	So

Special teams

Pos.	#	Name	Class
P	1	Tommy Heatherly	Sr
P, K	25	Daton Montiel	Fr
LS	31	Tommy Zozus	Jr
K	32	Matthew Enriquez	Fr
K	35	Lucas Matias	So
K	37	Chase Gabriel	Fr
LS	85	Jackson McDonald	Fr

Head coach

- Butch Davis (Arkansas)

Coordinators/assistant coaches

- Andrew Breiner (Lock Haven)
  Offensive coordinator/Wide receivers
- Everett Withers (Appalachian State)
  Associate head coach/Defensive coordinator/Secondary

Legend

- (C) Team captain
- (S) Suspended
- (I) Ineligible
- Injured
- Redshirt

Roster

== Game summaries ==
=== LIU ===
LIU Sharks at FIU Panthers – Game summary

Quarter	1	2	3	4	Total
Sharks	0	10	0	0	10
Panthers	21	7	10	10	48

at Riccardo Silva Stadium, Miami, Florida

- Date: September 2
- Game time: 8:00 p.m. EDT
- Game weather: Rain, 75 °F (24 °C)
- Game attendance: 0
- Referee: Jon Noil
- TV announcers (ESPN3): A. J. Ricketts and Cam Lynch
- Box score, Recap

Game information

First quarter

- FIU – D'vonte Price 8-yard run (Chase Gabriel kick), 13:55. Panthers 7–0. Drive: 3 plays, 69 yards, 1:05.
- FIU – D'vonte Price 68-yard run (Chase Gabriel kick), 4:52. Panthers 14–0. Drive: 2 plays, 80 yards, 0:28.
- FIU – Shaun Peterson Jr. 4-yard run (Chase Gabriel kick), 1:56. Panthers 21–0. Drive: 3 plays, 61 yards, 1:14.

Second quarter

- FIU – D'vonte Price 28-yard run (Chase Gabriel kick), 5:47. Panthers 28–0. Drive: 3 plays, 85 yards, 1:16.
- LIU – Derick Eugene 74-yard pass from Camden Orth (Paul Inzerillo kick), 3:59. Panthers 28–7. Drive: 3 plays, 74 yards, 1:40.
- LIU – Paul Inzerillo 29-yard field goal, 0:06. Panthers 28–10. Drive: 7 plays, 42 yards, 2:14.

Third quarter

- FIU – Bryce Singleton 52-yard pass from Max Bortenschlager (Chase Gabriel kick), 10:01. Panthers 35–10. Drive: 5 plays, 66 yards, 2:02.
- FIU – Chase Gabriel 29-yard field goal, 4:26. Panthers 38–10. Drive: 7 plays, 44 yards, 2:31.

Fourth quarter

- FIU – Tyrese Chambers 12-yard pass from Max Bortenschlager (Chase Gabriel kick), 11:06. Panthers 45–10. Drive: 8 plays, 73 yards, 3:34.
- FIU – Chase Gabriel 45-yard field goal, 7:33. Panthers 48–10. Drive: 5 plays, 13 yards, 1:50.

Top passers

- LIU – Camden Orth – 15/30, 197 yards, TD
- FIU – Max Bortenschlager – 14/17, 266 yards, 2 TD, INT

Top rushers

- LIU – Jonathan DeBique – 7 rushes, 34 yards
- FIU – D'Vonte Price – 5 rushes, 165 yards, 3 TD

Top receivers

- LIU – Derick Eugene – 7 receptions, 115 yards, TD
- FIU – Bryce Singleton – 6 receptions, 149 yards, TD

=== Texas State ===
Texas State Bobcats at FIU Panthers – Game summary

Quarter	1	2	3	4	OT	Total
Bobcats	7	3	0	7	6	23
Panthers	0	7	10	0	0	17

at Riccardo Silva Stadium, Miami, Florida

- Date: September 11
- Game time: 7:00 p.m. EDT
- Game weather: Cloudy, 85 °F (29 °C) • Wind: E 7 MPH
- Game attendance: 0
- Referee: Marshall Lewis
- TV announcers (ESPN+): A. J. Ricketts and Cam Lynch
- Box score, Recap

Game information

First quarter

- TXST – Caleb Twyford 17-yard pass from Brady McBride (Seth Keller kick), 12:14. Bobcats 7–0. Drive: 7 plays, 76 yards, 2:40.

Second quarter

- TXST – Seth Keller 48-yard field goal, 2:10. Bobcats 10–0. Drive: 10 plays, 58 yards, 4:58.
- FIU – Tyrese Chambers 22-yard pass from Max Bortenschlager (Chase Gabriel kick), 0:06. Bobcats 10–7. Drive: 9 plays, 75 yards, 2:04.

Third quarter

- FIU – Rivaldo Fairweather 34-yard pass from Max Bortenschlager (Chase Gabriel kick), 13:04. Panthers 14–10. Drive: 5 plays, 81 yards, 1:50.
- FIU – Chase Gabriel 18-yard field goal, 2:55. Panthers 17–10. Drive: 5 plays, 46 yards, 2:27.

Fourth quarter

- TXST – Brock Sturges 1-yard run (Seth Keller kick), 10:09. Tied 17–17. Drive: 10 plays, 62 yards, 4:23.

Overtime

- TXST – Brock Sturges 11-yard run. Bobcats 23–17. Drive: 2 plays, 25 yards.

Top passers

- TXST – Brady McBride – 18/31, 165 yards, TD
- FIU – Max Bortenschlager – 17/34, 259 yards, 2 TD

Top rushers

- TXST – Calvin Hill – 14 rushes, 72 yards
- FIU – D'vonte Price – 23 rushes, 113 yards

Top receivers

- TXST – Marcell Barbee – 8 receptions 67 yards
- FIU – Tyrese Chambers – 4 receptions, 79 yards, TD

=== At Texas Tech ===
FIU Panthers at Texas Tech Red Raiders – Game summary

Quarter	1	2	3	4	Total
Panthers	7	7	7	0	21
Red Raiders	7	28	9	10	54

at Jones AT&T Stadium, Lubbock, Texas

- Date: September 18
- Game time: 7:00 p.m. EDT/6:00 p.m. CDT
- Game weather: Sunny, 88 °F (31 °C)
- Game attendance: 50,118
- Referee: Tim Hedgepeth
- TV announcers (ESPN+): Mark Neely and Brandon Jacobs
- Box score, Recap

Game information

First quarter

- FIU – D'vonte Price 3-yard run (Chase Gabriel kick), 6:27. Panthers 7–0. Drive: 9 plays, 88 yards, 4:58.
- TTU – Marquise Waters 72-yard interception return (Jonathan Garibay kick), 3:18. Tied 7–7.

Second quarter

- TTU – Travis Koontz 4-yard pass from Tyler Shough (Jonathan Garibay kick), 12:15. Red Raiders 14–7. Drive: 7 plays, 80 yards, 2:29.
- FIU – E.J. Wilson Jr. 69-yard pass from Max Bortenschlager (Chase Gabriel kick), 10:51. Tied 14–14. Drive: 3 plays, 75 yards, 1:23.
- TTU – SaRodrick Thompson 1-yard run (Jonathan Garibay kick), 9:38. Red Raiders 21–14. Drive: 3 plays, 75 yards, 1:13.
- TTU – Trey Cleveland 28-yard pass from Tyler Shough (Jonathan Garibay kick), 4:48. Red Raiders 28–14. Drive: 6 plays, 68 yards, 2:42.
- TTU – Travis Koontz 1-yard pass from Tyler Shough (Jonathan Garibay kick), 0:05. Red Raiders 35–14. Drive: 12 plays, 61 yards, 2:52.

Third quarter

- TTU – Jonathan Garibay 21-yard field goal, 9:08. Red Raiders 38–14. Drive: 11 plays, 72 yards, 5:52.
- FIU – Nate Jefferson 2-yard pass from Max Bortenschlager (Chase Gabriel kick), 3:16. Red Raiders 38–21. Drive: 9 plays, 53 yards, 2:21.
- TTU – Mason Tharp 25-yard pass from Tyler Shough (kick failed), 0:55. Red Raiders 44–21. Drive: 6 plays, 75 yards, 2:21.

Fourth quarter

- TTU – Jonathan Garibay 28-yard field goal, 10:56. Red Raiders 47–21. Drive: 10 plays, 65 yards, 4:27.
- TTU – Henry Colombi 19-yard run (Jonathan Garibay kick), 5:47. Red Raiders 54–21. Drive: 7 plays, 55 yards, 3:41.

Top passers

- FIU – Max Bortenschlager – 12/27, 190 yards, 2 TD, INT
- TTU – Tyler Shough – 26/35, 399 yards, 4 TD

Top rushers

- FIU – D'vonte Price – 15 rushes, 51 yards, TD
- TTU – Tahj Brooks – 9 rushes, 47 yards

Top receivers

- FIU – Tyrese Chambers – 2 receptions, 71 yards
- TTU – Kaylon Geiger – 6 receptions, 121 yards

=== At Central Michigan ===
FIU Panthers at Central Michigan Chippewas – Game summary

Quarter	1	2	3	4	Total
Panthers	0	14	13	0	27
Chippewas	0	10	0	21	31

at Kelly/Shorts Stadium, Mount Pleasant, Michigan

- Date: September 25
- Game time: 12:00 p.m. EDT
- Game weather: Sunny
- Game attendance: 18,382
- Referee: Jon Noli
- TV announcers (ESPN+): Jim Barber and Randy Buffington
- Box score, Recap

Game information

First quarter

- No scoring plays

Second quarter

- CMU – Marshall Meeder 35-yard field goal, 8:36. Chippewas 3–0. Drive: 11 plays, 73 yards, 4:35.
- FIU – Tyrese Chambers 31-yard pass from Max Bortenschlager (Chase Gabriel kick), 5:51. Panthers 7–3. Drive: 6 plays, 77 yards, 2:33.
- FIU – Kamareon Williams 3-yard pass from Max Bortenschlager (Chase Gabriel kick), 1:33. Panthers 14–3. Drive: 7 plays, 99 yards, 1:19.
- CMU – Dallas Dixon 11-yard pass from Jacob Sirmon (Marshall Meeder kick), 0:34. Panthers 14–10. Drive: 2 plays, 7 yards, 0:10.

Third quarter

- FIU – D'vonte Price 5-yard run (kick blocked), 9:32. Panthers 20–10. Drive: 5 plays, 73 yards, 2:10.
- FIU – Rishard Dames 6-yard punt return (Chase Gabriel kick), 3:17. Panthers 27–10.

Fourth quarter

- CMU – Lew Nichols III 15-yard pass from Daniel Richardson (Marshall Meeder kick), 10:57. Panthers 27–17. Drive: 10 plays, 80 yards, 3:57.
- CMU – JaCorey Sullivan 14-yard pass from Daniel Richardson (Marshall Meeder kick), 7:12. Panthers 27–24. Drive: 8 plays, 76 yards, 1:53.
- CMU – Dallas Dixon 27-yard pass from Daniel Richardson (Marshall Meeder kick), 1:18. Chippewas 31–27. Drive: 5 plays, 80 yards, 0:42.

Top passers

- FIU – Max Bortenschlager – 20/38, 395 yards, 2 TD, INT
- CMU – Daniel Richardson – 16/23, 276 yards, 3 TD

Top rushers

- FIU – D'vonte Price – 17 rushes, 50 yards, TD
- CMU – Lew Nichols III – 25 rushes, 152 yards

Top receivers

- FIU – Tyrese Chambers – 6 receptions, 175 yards, TD
- CMU – Dallas Dixon – 8 receptions, 127 yards, 2 TD

=== At Florida Atlantic ===
FIU Panthers at Florida Atlantic Owls – Game summary

Quarter	1	2	3	4	Total
Panthers	7	14	0	0	21
Owls	7	27	10	14	58

at FAU Stadium, Boca Raton, Florida

- Date: October 2
- Game time: 3:30 p.m. EDT
- Game weather: Sunny, 85 °F (29 °C)
- Game attendance: 24,726
- Referee: Scott Hardin
- TV announcers (Stadium): Ari Wolfe and Max Browne
- Box score, Recap

Game information

First quarter

- FAU – N'Kosi Perry 8-yard run (Aaron Shahriari kick), 13:52. Owls 7–0. Drive: 4 plays, 75 yards, 1:08.
- FIU – D'vonte Price 1-yard run (Chase Gabriel kick), 7:18. Tied 7–7. Drive: 7 plays, 93 yards, 3:17.

Second quarter

- FAU – James Charles 32-yard run (run failed), 14:36. Owls 13–7. Drive: 5 plays, 80 yards, 1:41.
- FIU – Randall St. Felix 11-yard pass from Max Bortenschlager (Chase Gabriel kick), 12:03. Panthers 14–13. Drive: 6 plays, 75 yards, 2:33.
- FAU – Zaire Mitchell-Paden 22-yard pass from N'Kosi Perry (Aaron Shahriari kick), 8:42. Owls 20–14. Drive: 7 plays, 71 yards, 3:13.
- FAU – Johnny Ford 89-yard pass from N'Kosi Perry (Aaron Shahriari kick), 7:15. Owls 27–14. Drive: 1 play, 78 yards, 0:34.
- FIU – Tyrese Chambers 68-yard pass from Max Bortenschlager (Aaron Shahriari kick), 4:54. Owls 27–21. Drive: 4 plays, 78 yards, 2:13.
- FAU – Je'Quan Burton 42-yard pass from N'Kosi Perry (Aaron Shahriari kick), 1:33. Owls 34–21. Drive: 9 plays, 77 yards, 3:21.

Third quarter

- FAU – Aaron Shahriari 20-yard field goal, 5:09. Owls 37–21. Drive: 11 plays, 83 yards, 5:03.
- FAU – Nick Tronti 5-yard run (Aaron Shahriari kick), 1:49. Owls 44–21. Drive: 6 plays, 61 yards, 2:15.

Fourth quarter

- FAU – Johnny Ford 10-yard run (Aaron Shahriari kick), 10:13. Owls 51–21. Drive: 11 plays, 64 yards, 5:00.
- FAU – Kelvin Dean Jr. 20-yard run (Aaron Shahriari kick), 3:53. Owls 58–21. Drive: 9 plays, 84 yards, 3:54.

Top passers

- FIU – Max Bortenschlager – 12/28, 263 yards, 2 TD, INT
- FAU – N'Kosi Perry – 18/21, 329 yards, 3 TD

Top rushers

- FIU – E. J. Wilson Jr. – 5 rushes, 37 yards
- FAU – Johnny Ford – 16 rushes, 102 yards, TD

Top receivers

- FIU – Tyrese Chambers – 2 receptions, 79 yards, TD
- FAU – Je'Quan Burton – 7 receptions, 121 yards, TD

=== Charlotte ===
Charlotte 49ers at FIU Panthers – Game summary

Quarter	1	2	3	4	Total
49ers	7	10	14	14	45
Panthers	3	3	7	20	33

at Riccardo Silva Stadium, Miami, Florida

- Date: October 8
- Game time: 7:00 p.m. EDT
- Game weather: Cloudy, 82 °F (28 °C)
- Game attendance: 0
- Referee: Joe Lehring
- TV announcers (CBSSN): Chris Lewis and Donte Whitner
- Box score, Recap

Game information

First quarter

- FIU – Chase Gabriel 26-yard field goal, 8:59. Panthers 3–0. Drive: 12 plays, 66 yards, 6:01.
- CLT – Calvin Camp 2-yard run (Jonathan Cruz kick), 5:15. 49ers 7–3. Drive: 7 plays, 38 yards, 3:33.

Second quarter

- CLT – Taylor Thompson 5-yard pass from Chris Reynolds (Jonathan Cruz kick), 9:21. 49ers 14–3. Drive: 11 plays, 86 yards, 6:00.
- FIU – Chase Gabriel 43-yard field goal, 4:49. 49ers 14–6. Drive: 10 plays, 47 yards, 4:27.
- CLT – Jonathan Cruz 42-yard field goal, 0:03. 49ers 17–6. Drive: 9 plays, 18 yards, 4:35.

Third quarter

- CLT – Victor Tucker 22-yard pass from Chris Reynolds (Jonathan Cruz kick), 11:58. 49ers 24–6. Drive: 6 plays, 75 yards, 3:02.
- FIU – Kris Mitchell 50-yard pass from Max Bortenschlager (Chase Gabriel kick), 11:25. 49ers 24–13. Drive: 2 plays, 75 yards, 0:33.
- CLT – Jake Clemons 1-yard pass from Chris Reynolds (Jonathan Cruz kick), 3:46. 49ers 31–13. Drive: 5 plays, 70 yards, 2:08.

Fourth quarter

- FIU – Tyrese Chambers 59-yard pass from Max Bortenschlager (Chase Gabriel kick), 11:10. 49ers 31–20. Drive: 4 plays, 75 yards, 1:26.
- CLT – Jonathan Cruz 41-yard interception return (Jonathan Cruz kick), 5:45. 49ers 38–20.
- FIU – Tyrese Chambers 75-yard pass from Max Bortenschlager (Chase Gabriel kick), 5:35. 49ers 38–27. Drive: 1 play, 75 yards, 0:10.
- CLT – Ryan Carriere 4-yard pass from Chris Reynolds (Jonathan Cruz kick), 2:36. 49ers 45–27. Drive: 6 plays, 44 yards, 2:59.
- FIU – Sterling Palmer 8-yard pass from Max Bortenschlager (kick failed), 0:14. 49ers 45–33. Drive: 8 plays, 75 yards, 2:22.

Top passers

- CLT – Chris Reynolds – 22/28, 199 yards, 4 TD
- FIU – Max Bortenschlager – 19/30, 466 yards, 4 TD, INT

Top rushers

- CLT – Shadrick Byrd – 14 rushes, 80 yards
- FIU – D'vonte Price – 18 rushes, 89 yards

Top receivers

- CLT – Victor Tucker – 8 receptions, 82 yards, TD
- FIU – Tyrese Chambers – 3 receptions, 201 yards, 2 TD

=== Western Kentucky ===
Western Kentucky Hilltoppers at FIU Panthers – Game summary

Quarter	1	2	3	4	Total
Hilltoppers	0	17	7	10	34
Panthers	6	6	0	7	19

at Riccardo Silva Stadium, Miami, Florida

- Date: October 23
- Game time: 7:00 p.m. EDT
- Game weather: Sunny, 80 °F (27 °C)
- Game attendance: 0
- Referee: Patrick Foy
- TV announcers (ESPN+): A. J. Ricketts and Cam Lynch
- Box score, Recap

Game information

First quarter

- FIU – Max Bortenschlager 1-yard run (kick blocked), 10:22. Panthers 6–0. Drive: 12 plays, 75 yards, 4:38.

Second quarter

- WKU – Adam Cofield 8-yard run (Brayden Narveson kick), 7:13. Hilltoppers 7–6. Drive: 8 plays, 80 yards, 2:52.
- FIU – Randall St. Felix 75-yard pass from Max Bortenschlager (pass failed), 7:04. Panthers 12–7. Drive: 1 play, 75 yards, 0:09.
- WKU – Brayden Narveson 23-yard field goal, 1:22. Panthers 12–10. Drive: 13 plays, 70 yards, 5:42.
- WKU – Mitchell Tinsley 32-yard pass from Bailey Zappe (Brayden Narveson kick), 0:15. Hilltoppers 17–12. Drive: 5 plays, 80 yards, 0:34.

Third quarter

- WKU – Jerreth Sterns 20-yard pass from Bailey Zappe (Brayden Narveson kick), 11:35. Hilltoppers 24–12. Drive: 8 plays, 75 yards, 3:25.

Fourth quarter

- WKU – Jerreth Sterns 1-yard pass from Bailey Zappe (Brayden Narveson kick), 11:08. Hilltoppers 31–12. Drive: 9 plays, 63 yards, 3:52.
- WKU – Brayden Narveson 26-yard field goal, 4:08. Hilltoppers 34–12. Drive: 13 plays, 82 yards, 5:20.
- FIU – Shaun Peterson Jr. 3-yard run (Chase Gabriel kick), 1:39. Hilltoppers 34–19. Drive: 9 plays, 75 yards, 2:29.

Top passers

- WKU – Bailey Zappe – 39/49, 382 yards, 3 TD
- FIU – Max Bortenschlager – 15/32, 192 yards, TD

Top rushers

- WKU – Adam Cofield – 15 rushes, 74 yards, TD
- FIU – D'vonte Price – 15 rushes, 86 yards

Top rushers

- WKU – Jerreth Sterns – 14 receptions, 115 yards, 2 TD
- FIU – Randall St. Felix – 5 receptions, 104 yards, TD

=== At Marshall ===
FIU Panthers at Marshall Thundering Herd – Game summary

Quarter	1	2	3	4	Total
Panthers	0	0	0	0	0
Thundering Herd	3	21	7	7	38

at Joan C. Edwards Stadium, Huntington, West Virginia

- Date: October 30
- Game time: 3:30 p.m. EDT
- Game weather: Sunny
- Game attendance: 18,466
- Referee: Rodney Burnette
- TV announcers (Stadium): Noah Coslov and Max Starks
- Box score, Recap

Game information

First quarter

- MRSH – Shane Ciucci 29-yard field goal, 6:50. Thundering Herd 3–0. Drive: 12 plays, 68 yards, 3:30.

Second quarter

- MRSH – Grant Wells 2-yard run (Shane Ciucci kick), 9:00. Thundering Herd 10–0. Drive: 8 plays, 35 yards, 2:56.
- MRSH – Sheldon Evans 41-yard run (Shane Ciucci kick), 7:33. Thundering Herd 17–0. Drive: 3 plays, 48 yards, 0:37.
- MRSH – Rasheen Ali 6-yard run (Shane Ciucci kick), 3:16. Thundering Herd 24–0. Drive: 10 plays, 77 yards, 2:46.

Third quarter

- MRSH – Rasheen Ali 2-yard run (Shane Ciucci kick), 0:30. Thundering Herd 31–0. Drive: 17 plays, 80 yards, 6:56.

Fourth quarter

- MRSH – Ethan Payne 1-yard run (Shane Ciucci kick), 9:16. Thundering Herd 38–0. Drive: 6 plays, 38 yards, 2:08.

Top passers

- FIU – Max Bortenschlager – 14/28, 128 yards, INT
- MRSH – Grant Wells – 20/25, 184 yards

Top rushers

- FIU – D'vonte Price – 10 rushes, 51 yards
- MRSH – Rasheen Ali – 26 rushes, 133 yards, 2 TD

Top receivers

- FIU – Rivaldo Fairweather – 4 receptions, 59 yards
- MRSH – Shadeed Ahmed – 5 receptions, 52 yards

=== Old Dominion ===
Old Dominion Monarchs at FIU Panthers – Game summary

Quarter	1	2	3	4	Total
Monarchs	24	0	6	17	47
Panthers	10	0	7	7	24

at Riccardo Silva Stadium, Miami, Florida

- Date: November 6
- Game time: 7:00 p.m. EST
- Game weather: Sunny, 72 °F (22 °C)
- Game attendance: 0
- Referee: Jonathan Noil
- TV announcers (ESPN3): A. J. Ricketts and Patrick Murray
- Box score, Recap

Game information

First quarter

- ODU – Zack Kuntz 20-yard pass from Hayden Wolff (Nick Rice kick), 11:59. Monarchs 7–0. Drive: 5 plays, 62 yards, 1:23.
- ODU – Nick Rice 50-yard field goal, 10:19. Monarchs 10–0. Drive: 4 plays, -2 yards, 0:52.
- FIU – Tyrese Chambers 46-yard pass from Max Bortenschlager (Chase Gabriel kick), 8:22. Monarchs 10–7. Drive: 6 plays, 72 yards, 1:48.
- ODU – Elijah Davis 61-yard run (Nick Rice kick), 6:56. Monarchs 17–7. Drive: 6 plays, 72 yards, 1:48.
- FIU – Chase Gabriel 21-yard field goal, 3:27. Monarchs 17–10. Drive: 8 plays, 71 yards, 3:29.
- ODU – Blake Watson 3-yard run (Nick Rice kick), 0:27. Monarchs 24–10. Drive: 7 plays, 51 yards, 2:53.

Second quarter

- No scoring plays

Third quarter

- ODU – Darius Savedge 63-yard pass from Hayden Wolff (kick failed), 9:37. Monarchs 30–10. Drive: 8 plays, 93 yards, 2:58.
- FIU – Bryce Singleton 65-yard pass from Max Bortenschlager (Chase Gabriel kick), 8:15. Monarchs 30–17. Drive: 4 plays, 75 yards, 1:22.

Fourth quarter

- ODU – Deeve Harris 40-yard interception return (Nick Rice kick), 14:46. Monarchs 37–17.
- ODU – Nick Rice 31-yard field goal, 7:12. Monarchs 40–17. Drive: 10 plays, 36 yards, 3:58.
- FIU – Bryce Singleton 13-yard pass from Grayson James (Chase Gabriel kick), 5:59. Monarchs 40–24. Drive: 5 plays, 75 yards, 1:13.
- ODU – Blake Watson 7-yard run (Nick Rice kick), 1:01. Monarchs 47–24. Drive: 9 plays, 48 yards, 4:57.

Top passers

- ODU – Hayden Wolff – 22/42, 283 yards, 2 TD, INT
- FIU – Max Bortenschlager – 18/32, 315 yards, 2 TD, INT

Top rushers

- ODU – Blake Watson – 28 rushes, 158 yards, 2 TD
- FIU – Lexington Joseph – 11 rushes, 54 yards

Top receivers

- ODU – Zack Kuntz – 9 receptions, 102 yards, TD
- FIU – Bryce Singleton – 6 receptions, 199 yards, 2 TD

=== At Middle Tennessee ===
FIU Panthers at Middle Tennessee Blue Raiders – Game summary

Quarter	1	2	3	4	Total
Panthers	3	0	0	7	10
Blue Raiders	7	27	9	7	50

at Johnny "Red" Floyd Stadium, Murfreesboro, Tennessee

- Date: November 13
- Game time: 3:30 p.m. EST/2:30 p.m. CST
- Game weather: Sunny, 48 °F (9 °C)
- Game attendance: 10,606
- Referee: Kevin Randall
- TV announcers (ESPN3): Jake Rose and Jeremy Kellum
- Box score, Recap

Game information

First quarter

- MTSU – Jimmy Marshall 12-yard pass from Nick Vattiato (Zeke Rankin kick), 9:00. Blue Raiders 7–0. Drive: 14 plays, 75 yards, 6:00.
- FIU – Chase Gabriel 53-yard field goal, 4:27. Blue Raiders 7–3. Drive: 11 plays, 40 yards, 4:33.

Second quarter

- MTSU – Yusuf Ali 1-yard pass from Nick Vattiato (Zeke Rankin kick), 13:30. Blue Raiders 14–3. Drive: 15 plays, 75 yards, 5:57.
- MTSU – Frank Peasant 2-yard run (Zeke Rankin kick), 6:52. Blue Raiders 21–3. Drive: 12 plays, 58 yards, 5:05.
- MTSU – Quincy Riley 45-yard interception return (Zeke Rankin kick), 6:34. Blue Raiders 28–3.
- MTSU – Zeke Rankin 24-yard field goal, 3:54. Blue Raiders 31–3. Drive: 5 plays, 10 yards, 2:27.
- MTSU – Zeke Rankin 46-yard field goal, 1:26. Blue Raiders 34–3. Drive: 5 plays, 16 yards, 1:49.

Third quarter

- MTSU – Marley Cook safety, 10:13. Blue Raiders 36–3.
- MTSU – Martell Pettaway 57-yard run (Zeke Rankin kick), 9:52. Blue Raiders 43–3. Drive: 1 play, 57 yards, 0:13.

Fourth quarter

- MTSU – Jaylin Lane 29-yard run (Zeke Rankin kick), 14:11. Blue Raiders 50–3. Drive: 9 plays, 74 yards, 3:56.
- FIU – Maleek Williams 8-yard run (Chase Gabriel kick), 6:08. Blue Raiders 50–10. Drive: 8 plays, 53 yards, 4:18.

Top passers

- FIU – Max Bortenschlager – 9/20, 68 yards, 2 INT
- MTSU – Nick Vattiato – 20/24, 147 yards, 2 TD

Top rushers

- FIU – E. J. Wilson Jr. – 10 rushes, 42 yards
- MTSU – Martell Pettaway – 11 rushes, 95 yards, TD

Top receivers

- FIU – Bryce Singleton – 4 receptions, 33 yards
- MTSU – Jimmy Marshall – 4 receptions, 51 yards, TD

=== North Texas ===
North Texas Mean Green at FIU Panthers – Game summary

Quarter	1	2	3	4	Total
Mean Green	7	28	14	0	49
Panthers	0	0	7	0	7

at Riccardo Silva Stadium, Miami, Florida

- Date: November 20
- Game time: 7:00 p.m. EST
- Game weather: Rain, 50 °F (10 °C)
- Game attendance: 0
- Referee: Kevin Vicknair
- TV announcers (ESPN3): A. J. Ricketts and Patrick Murray
- Box score, Recap

Game information

First quarter

- UNT – Austin Aune 11-yard run (Ethan Mooney kick), 8:03. Mean Green 7–0. Drive: 4 plays, 40 yards, 1:32.

Second quarter

- UNT – Roderic Burns 55-yard pass from Austin Aune (Ethan Mooney kick), 12:43. Mean Green 14–0. Drive: 3 plays, 80 yards, 0:56.
- UNT – DeAndre Torrey 50-yard run (Ethan Mooney kick), 10:09. Mean Green 21–0. Drive: 2 plays, 52 yards, 0:35.
- UNT – Khatib Lyles 35-yard pass from Austin Aune (Ethan Mooney kick), 4:45. Mean Green 28–0. Drive: 4 plays, 80 yards, 1:42.
- UNT – DeAndre Torrey 1-yard run (Ethan Mooney kick), 0:31. Mean Green 35–0. Drive: 9 plays, 76 yards, 2:50.

Third quarter

- FIU – Tyrese Chambers 60-yard pass from Max Bortenschlager (Chase Gabriel kick), 13:36. Mean Green 35–7. Drive: 2 plays, 75 yards, 1:24.
- UNT – Ikaika Ragsdale 5-yard run (Ethan Mooney kick), 10:06. Mean Green 42–7. Drive: 10 plays, 75 yards, 3:30.
- UNT – Ayo Adeyi 28-yard run (Ethan Mooney kick), 7:36. Mean Green 49–7. Drive: 5 plays, 55 yards, 1:40.

Fourth quarter

- No scoring plays

Top passers

- UNT – Austin Aune – 6/12, 219 yards, 2 TD
- FIU – Max Bortenschlager – 15/32, 167 yards, TD, INT

Top rushers

- UNT – DeAndre Torrey – 18 rushes, 109 yards, 2 TD
- FIU – Shaun Peterson Jr. – 5 rushes, 30 yards

Top receivers

- UNT – Roderic Burns – 3 receptions, 106 yards, TD
- FIU – Tyrese Chambers – 3 receptions, 79 yards, TD

=== At Southern Miss ===
FIU Panthers at Southern Miss Golden Eagles – Game summary

Quarter	1	2	3	4	Total
Panthers	7	7	3	0	17
Golden Eagles	21	0	3	13	37

at M. M. Roberts Stadium, Hattiesburg, Mississippi

- Date: November 27
- Game time: 3:00 p.m. EST/2:00 p.m. CST
- Game weather: Sunny, 61 °F (16 °C)
- Game attendance: 20,041
- Referee: Patrick Foy
- TV announcers (ESPN+): Jason Baker and Dustin Almond
- Box score, Recap

Game information

First quarter

- USM – Dajon Richard 29-yard run (Briggs Bourgeois kick), 6:26. Golden Eagles 7–0. Drive: 9 plays, 92 yards, 5:15.
- USM – Jason Brownlee 34-yard pass from Frank Gore Jr. (Briggs Bourgeois kick), 6:01. Golden Eagles 14–0. Drive: 1 play, 34 yards, 0:08.
- USM – Frank Gore Jr. 2-yard run (Briggs Bourgeois kick), 3:46. Golden Eagles 21–0. Drive: 1 play, 2 yards, 0:04.
- FIU – Tyrese Chambers 91-yard pass from Max Bortenschlager (Chase Gabriel kick), 0:58. Golden Eagles 21–7. Drive: 2 plays, 96 yards, 0:51.

Second quarter

- FIU – Lexington Joseph 8-yard run (Briggs Bourgeois kick), 11:01. Golden Eagles 21–14. Drive: 7 plays, 79 yards, 3:14.

Third quarter

- USM – Briggs Bourgeois 25-yard field goal, 9:59. Golden Eagles 24–14. Drive: 9 plays, 67 yards, 5:01.
- FIU – Chase Gabriel 26-yard field goal, 4:46. Golden Eagles 24–17. Drive: 11 plays, 66 yards, 5:13.

Fourth quarter

- USM – Frank Gore Jr. 5-yard run (Briggs Bourgeois kick), 10:37. Golden Eagles 31–17. Drive: 12 plays, 75 yards, 7:29.
- USM – Jason Brownlee 34-yard pass from Frank Gore Jr. (kick blocked), 8:45. Golden Eagles 37–17. Drive: 1 play, 34 yards, 0:06.

Top passers

- FIU – Max Borternschlager – 13/24, 231 yards, TD, 2 INT
- USM – Frank Gore Jr. – 4/5, 81 yards, 2 TD

Top rushers

- FIU – Lexington Joseph – 16 rushes, 105 yards, TD
- USM – Dajon Richard – 16 rushes, 107 yards, TD

Top receivers

- FIU – Tyrese Chambers – 5 receptions, 155 yards, TD
- USM – Jason Brownlee – 5 receptions, 98 yards, 2 TD
