= LaMareon James =

American football player (born 2000)

Profile
- Position: Cornerback

Personal information
- Born: October 25, 2000 (age 26); Norfolk, Virginia, U.S.
- Listed height: 5 ft 10 in (1.78 m)
- Listed weight: 192 lb (87 kg)

Career information
- High school: Norfolk Christian School (Norfolk, Virginia) Indian River (Chesapeake, Virginia)
- College: Old Dominion (2021–2023); TCU (2024)
- NFL draft: 2025: undrafted

Career history
- Cleveland Browns (2025)*; New York Giants (2025)*; +
- * Offseason or practice squad member only
- Stats at Pro Football Reference

LaMareon James (born October 25, 2000) is an American professional football cornerback. He played college football for the Old Dominion Monarchs and TCU Horned Frogs.

== Early life ==
James attended Indian River High School in Chesapeake, Virginia. Coming out of high school, he initially committed to play college football for the North Carolina Tar Heels over other offers such as Virginia, Virginia Tech, Auburn, Michigan, Nebraska and Pittsburgh. However, James eventually flipped and signed to play for the Old Dominion Monarchs.

== College career ==
=== Old Dominion ===
During the 2021 Myrtle Beach Bowl, James returned the opening kickoff 100 yards for a touchdown against Tulsa. In week 3 of the 2023 season, he intercepted a pass which he returned 66 yards for a touchdown, while also recovering a fumble which he returned 80 yards for a touchdown against Wake Forest. After the season, James entered his name into the NCAA transfer portal. He finished his three-year career with the Monarchs from 2021 to 2023, appearing in 38 games, recording 86 tackles with one being for a loss, ten pass deflections, two interceptions, four fumble recoveries, two forced fumbles, and two defensive touchdowns, while also totaling 1,346 return yards, and two return touchdowns.

=== TCU ===
James transferred to play for the TCU Horned Frogs. In 2024, he started all 13 games, where he recorded 35 tackles, 14 pass deflections, and an interception, earning all-Big 12 honorable mention. After the season, James declared for the 2025 NFL draft.

== Professional career ==
Pre-draft measurables
Height	Weight	Arm length	Hand span	40-yard dash	10-yard split	20-yard split	20-yard shuttle	Three-cone drill	Vertical jump	Broad jump	Bench press
5 ft 9 1/2 in (1.77 m)	193 lb (88 kg)	29 1/8 in (0.74 m)	8 3/4 in (0.22 m)	4.40 s	1.53 s	2.50 s	4.40 s	7.19 s	36.5 in (0.93 m)	10 ft 7 in (3.23 m)	15 reps
All values from Pro Day

=== Cleveland Browns ===
After not being selected in the 2025 NFL draft, James signed with the Cleveland Browns as an undrafted free agent. He was waived on August 26 as part of final roster cuts and re-signed to the practice squad the next day. James was released on September 16.

=== New York Giants ===
On September 17, 2025, James signed with the New York Giants' practice squad. He was released on October 23.

=== Houston Gamblers ===
On January 13, 2026, James was selected by the Houston Gamblers in the 2026 UFL Draft.
