= Stone Smartt =

American football player (born 1998)

No. 84 – New Orleans Saints
- Position: Tight end
- Roster status: Practice squad

Personal information
- Born: October 4, 1998 (age 28); Sacramento, California, U.S.
- Listed height: 6 ft 4 in (1.93 m)
- Listed weight: 226 lb (103 kg)

Career information
- High school: Del Oro (Loomis, California)
- College: Northern Arizona (2017); Riverside City (2018); Old Dominion (2019–2021)
- NFL draft: 2022: undrafted

Career history
- Los Angeles Chargers (2022–2024); New York Jets (2025); Philadelphia Eagles (2026)*; New Orleans Saints (2026–present)*
- * Offseason or practice squad member only

Awards and highlights
- NJCAA First-team All-American (2018)

Career NFL statistics as of 2024
- Receptions: 31
- Receiving yards: 380
- Receiving touchdowns: 1
- Stats at Pro Football Reference

Stone Cole Smartt (born October 4, 1998) is an American professional football tight end for the New Orleans Saints of the National Football League (NFL). He played college football for the Old Dominion Monarchs.

== Early life ==
Smartt attended Del Oro High School in Loomis, California. During his high school career, he played the quarterback position, throwing for 3,021 yards from scrimmage with 29 touchdowns. He took his team in 2015-16 to a Division II-AA State title championship by beating Camarillo (16-13). In 2016-17 he led Del Oro to a Division 1-A state championship game against San Clemente. Smartt was also an established point guard for the Del Oro boys basketball team. He committed to Northern Arizona University to play college football in 2017.

== College career ==
As a true freshman at NAU in 2017, Smartt played in just 2 games. He transferred to Riverside City in 2018, where he played in 12 games and completed 177 out of 277 for 2,754 yards and 31 touchdowns. He rushed for 583 yards and nine touchdowns, and led California JUCO quarterbacks in passing efficiency.

Smartt was named a First-Team JUCO All-American, earned SoCal Regional Playoff MVP, SCFA Offensive Player of the Year and California State Offensive Player of the Year. He broke school record for most completions in a season, highest completion percentage, most passing yards in a season and career, and most touchdown passes in a quarter. He won the NJCAA Athletic Bureau Offensive Player of the Year. In 2019, he transferred to Old Dominion. He moved from quarterback to wide receiver in 2021.

=== College statistics ===
Season	Team	Games		Passing							Rushing				Receiving			
Season	Team	GP	GS	Cmp	Att	Pct	Yds	TD	Int	Rtg	Att	Yds	Avg	TD	Rec	Yds	Avg	TD
2017	Northern Arizona	9	0	13	28	46.4	105	1	1	53.4	34	97	2.9	2	0	0	0.0	0
2018	Riverside City	12	12	177	277	63.9	2,754	31	3	182.2	132	583	4.4	9	0	0	0.0	0
2019	Old Dominion	10	7	101	177	57.1	1,006	1	6	99.9	104	181	1.7	5	0	0	0.0	0
2020	Old Dominion	Season canceled due to the COVID-19 pandemic																
2021	Old Dominion	8	5	0	0	0.0	0	0	0	0.0	5	10	2.0	0	17	167	9.8	0
Career		39	24	291	482	60.3	3,865	33	10	99.9	275	871	3.1	16	17	167	9.8	0

== Professional career ==
Pre-draft measurables
Height	Weight	Arm length	Hand span	Wingspan	40-yard dash	10-yard split	20-yard split	20-yard shuttle	Three-cone drill	Vertical jump	Broad jump	Bench press
6 ft 4 1/8 in (1.93 m)	226 lb (103 kg)	31 1/2 in (0.80 m)	9 1/8 in (0.23 m)	6 ft 6 1/4 in (1.99 m)	4.62 s	1.58 s	2.60 s	4.19 s	7.14 s	40.0 in (1.02 m)	10 ft 8 in (3.25 m)	12 reps
All values from Pro Day

=== Los Angeles Chargers ===
Smartt signed with the Los Angeles Chargers after going unselected in the 2022 NFL draft. In his three years with the Chargers, Smartt was third on the depth chart as a backup tight end and special teamer.

=== New York Jets ===
On March 17, 2025, Smartt signed with the New York Jets. Smartt made 15 appearances for New York, recording seven receptions for 52 scoreless yards.

=== Philadelphia Eagles ===
On March 23, 2026, Smartt signed with the Philadelphia Eagles. Smartt was released by the Eagles as a part of final roster cuts on August 29.

=== New Orleans Saints ===
On September 1, 2026, Smartt was signed to the practice squad of the New Orleans Saints.

== Personal life ==
Smartt is of Taiwanese descent through his grandmother, who was born there.
