= 2021 Middle Tennessee Blue Raiders football team =

American college football season

2021 Middle Tennessee Blue Raiders football

Bahamas Bowl champion

Bahamas Bowl, W 31–24 vs. Toledo
- Conference: Conference USA
- East Division
- Record: 7–6 (4–4 C-USA)
- Head coach: Rick Stockstill (16th season)
- Offensive coordinator: Brent Dearmon (1st season)
- Offensive scheme: Pro spread
- Defensive coordinator: Scott Shafer (5th season)
- Base defense: Multiple 4–3
- Home stadium: Johnny "Red" Floyd Stadium

2021 Conference USA football standings
	Conf.			Overall
Team	W		L	W		L
East Division
Western Kentucky xy	7	–	1	9	–	5
Marshall	5	–	3	7	–	6
Old Dominion	5	–	3	6	–	7
Middle Tennessee	4	–	4	7	–	6
Florida Atlantic	3	–	5	5	–	7
Charlotte	3	–	5	5	–	7
FIU	0	–	8	1	–	11
West Division
UTSA xy$	7	–	1	12	–	2
UAB	6	–	2	9	–	4
North Texas	5	–	3	6	–	7
UTEP	4	–	4	7	–	6
Rice	3	–	5	4	–	8
Southern Miss	2	–	6	3	–	9
Louisiana Tech	2	–	6	3	–	9
Championship: UTSA 49, Western Kentucky 41
$ – Conference champion; x – Division champion/co-champions; y – Championship game participant

The 2021 Middle Tennessee Blue Raiders football team represented Middle Tennessee State University as a member of the East Division of Conference USA (C-USA) during the 2021 NCAA Division I FBS football season. Led by 16th-year head coach Rick Stockstill, the Blue Raiders compiled an overall record of 7–6 with a mark of 5–4 in conference play, placing fourth in the C-USA's East Division. Middle Tennessee was invited to the Bahamas Bowl, where they defeated Toledo. The team played home games at Johnny "Red" Floyd Stadium in Murfreesboro, Tennessee.

== Schedule ==
Middle Tennessee announced its 2021 football schedule on January 27, 2021. The 2021 schedule consisted of five home and seven away games in the regular season.

Date	Time	Opponent	Site	TV	Result	Attendance
September 4	5:00 p.m.	No. 13 (FCS) Monmouth*	Johnny "Red" Floyd Stadium; Murfreesboro, TN	ESPN3	W 50–15	15,017
September 11	1:00 p.m.	at No. 19 Virginia Tech*	Lane Stadium; Blacksburg, VA	ACCNX/ESPN+	L 14–35	53,680
September 18	4:00 p.m.	at UTSA	Alamodome; San Antonio, TX	ESPN+	L 13–27	16,202
September 24	5:30 p.m.	at Charlotte	Jerry Richardson Stadium; Charlotte, NC	CBSSN	L 39–42	11,076
October 2	5:30 p.m.	Marshall	Johnny "Red" Floyd Stadium; Murfreesboro, TN	Stadium	W 34–28	15,806
October 9	2:30 p.m.	at Liberty*	Williams Stadium; Lynchburg, VA	ESPN3	L 13–41	19,935
October 22	5:00 p.m.	at UConn*	Rentschler Field; East Hartford, CT	CBSSN	W 44–13	10,698
October 30	2:30 p.m.	Southern Miss^{†}	Johnny "Red" Floyd Stadium; Murfreesboro, TN	ESPN+	W 35–10	10,721
November 6	2:30 p.m.	at Western Kentucky	Houchens Industries–L. T. Smith Stadium; Bowling Green, KY (100 Miles of Hate)	Stadium	L 21–48	15,022
November 13	2:30 p.m.	FIU	Johnny "Red" Floyd Stadium; Murfreesboro, TN	ESPN3	W 50–10	10,606
November 20	2:30 p.m.	Old Dominion	Johnny "Red" Floyd Stadium; Murfreesboro, TN	ESPN+	L 17–24	9,606
November 27	6:00 p.m.	at Florida Atlantic	FAU Stadium; Boca Raton, FL	Stadium	W 27–17	15,127
December 17	11:00 a.m.	vs. Toledo*	Thomas Robinson Stadium; Nassau, Bahamas (Bahamas Bowl)	ESPN	W 31–24	13,596
*Non-conference game; ^{†}Homecoming; Rankings from AP Poll released prior to the game; All times are in Central time
