= 2021 Florida Atlantic Owls football team =

American college football season

2021 Florida Atlantic Owls football
- Conference: Conference USA
- East Division
- Record: 5–7 (3–5 C–USA)
- Head coach: Willie Taggart (2nd season)
- Offensive coordinator: Mike Johnson (1st season)
- Offensive scheme: Pro-style
- Defensive coordinator: Mike Stoops (1st season)
- Base defense: 3–4
- Home stadium: FAU Stadium

2021 Conference USA football standings
	Conf.			Overall
Team	W		L	W		L
East Division
Western Kentucky xy	7	–	1	9	–	5
Marshall	5	–	3	7	–	6
Old Dominion	5	–	3	6	–	7
Middle Tennessee	4	–	4	7	–	6
Florida Atlantic	3	–	5	5	–	7
Charlotte	3	–	5	5	–	7
FIU	0	–	8	1	–	11
West Division
UTSA xy$	7	–	1	12	–	2
UAB	6	–	2	9	–	4
North Texas	5	–	3	6	–	7
UTEP	4	–	4	7	–	6
Rice	3	–	5	4	–	8
Southern Miss	2	–	6	3	–	9
Louisiana Tech	2	–	6	3	–	9
Championship: UTSA 49, Western Kentucky 41
$ – Conference champion; x – Division champion/co-champions; y – Championship game participant

The 2021 Florida Atlantic Owls football team represented Florida Atlantic University in the 2021 NCAA Division I FBS football season. The Owls played their home games at FAU Stadium in Boca Raton, Florida, and competed in the East Division of Conference USA (CUSA). They were led by head coach Willie Taggart, in his second year.

== Schedule ==
Date	Time	Opponent	Site	TV	Result	Attendance
September 4	7:30 p.m.	at No. 13 Florida*	Ben Hill Griffin Stadium; Gainesville, FL	SECN	L 14–35	86,840
September 11	3:30 p.m.	Georgia Southern*	FAU Stadium; Boca Raton, FL	Stadium	W 38–6	17,736
September 18	6:00 p.m.	Fordham*	FAU Stadium; Boca Raton, FL	ESPN3	W 45–14	17,132
September 25	8:00 p.m.	at Air Force*	Falcon Stadium; Colorado Springs, CO	FS2	L 7–31	19,763
October 2	3:30 p.m.	FIU	FAU Stadium; Boca Raton, FL (Shula Bowl)	Stadium	W 58–21	24,726
October 9	3:30 p.m.	at UAB	Protective Stadium; Birmingham, AL	Stadium	L 14–31	25,191
October 21	7:30 p.m.	at Charlotte	Jerry Richardson Stadium; Charlotte, NC	CBSSN	W 38–9	13,017
October 30	6:00 p.m.	UTEP^{†}	FAU Stadium; Boca Raton, FL	ESPN+	W 28–25	16,432
November 6	6:00 p.m.	Marshall	FAU Stadium; Boca Raton, FL	CBSSN	L 13–28	21,803
November 13	7:00 p.m.	at Old Dominion	S.B. Ballard Stadium; Norfolk, VA	ESPN3	L 16–30	13,634
November 20	12:00 p.m.	at Western Kentucky	Houchens Industries–L. T. Smith Stadium; Bowling Green, KY	Stadium	L 17–52	10,477
November 27	7:00 p.m.	Middle Tennessee	FAU Stadium; Boca Raton, FL	Stadium	L 17–27	15,127
*Non-conference game; ^{†}Homecoming; Rankings from AP Poll released prior to the game; All times are in Eastern time
