= Blake Watson =

American football player (born 1999)

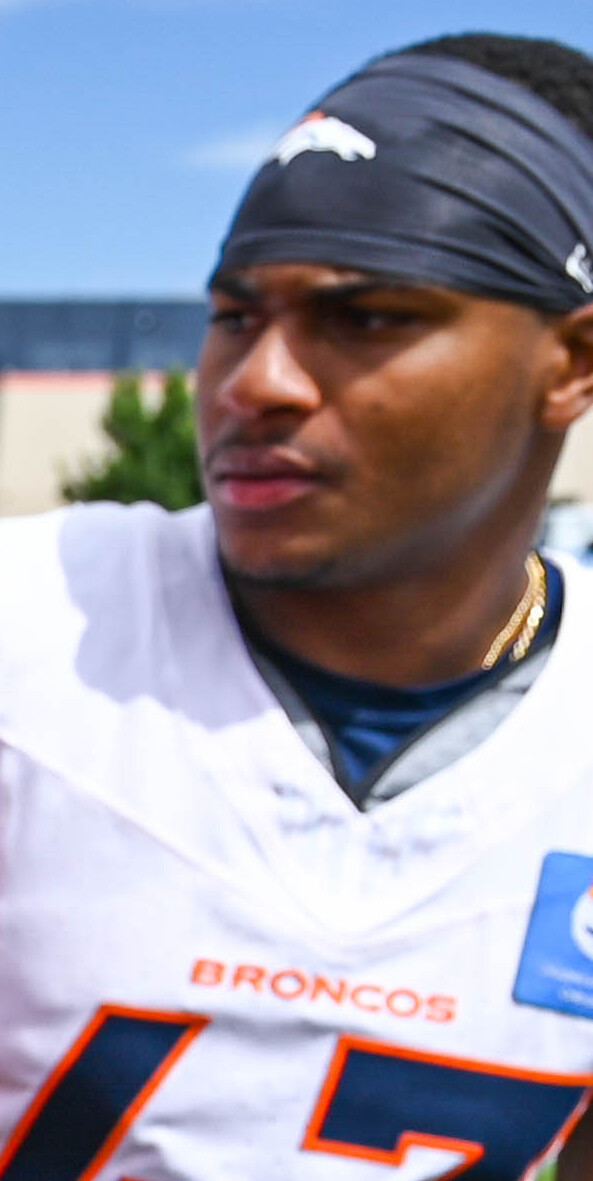
- Watson with the Denver Broncos in 2024

Profile
- Position: Running back

Personal information
- Born: October 14, 1999 (age 27); Queens, New York, U.S.
- Listed height: 5 ft 9 in (1.75 m)
- Listed weight: 195 lb (88 kg)

Career information
- High school: Green Hope (Cary, North Carolina)
- College: Old Dominion (2018–2022); Memphis (2023)
- NFL draft: 2024: undrafted

Career history
- Denver Broncos (2024); Tennessee Titans (2025)*
- * Offseason or practice squad member only

Awards and highlights
- First-team All-AAC (2023)

Career NFL statistics as of 2025
- Rush attempts: 4
- Rushing yards: 10
- Receptions: 1
- Receiving yards: 13
- Stats at Pro Football Reference

Blake Watson (born October 14, 1999) is an American professional football running back. He played college football for the Old Dominion Monarchs and Memphis Tigers and was signed by the Denver Broncos as an undrafted free agent in 2024.

== College career ==
=== Old Dominion ===
On October 15, 2022, in the 49–21 upset win against Coastal Carolina, Watson set many school records, rushing the ball 19 times for 259 yards and 3 touchdowns. In the 2022 season, he rushed 158 times for 918 yards and 5 touchdowns, and 37 receptions for 314 yards and 2 touchdowns. He finished his career at Old Dominion with 398 carries for 2,146 yards and 14 touchdowns, and 60 receptions for 448 yards and 3 touchdowns. On November 28, 2022, Watson announced he would enter the transfer portal.

=== Memphis ===
On December 19, 2022, Watson announced he would be transferring to Memphis. In the 21–31 loss against Tulane, Watson carried the ball 5 times for 13 yards, but would sit out for the rest of the game due to injury concern.

=== Statistics ===
Season	Team	Games		Rushing				Receiving			
Season	Team	GP	GS	Att	Yards	Avg	TD	Rec	Yards	Avg	TD
2018	Old Dominion	3	0	0	0	0.0	0	0	0	0.0	0
2019	Old Dominion	11	3	25	116	4.6	1	13	79	6.1	0
2020	Old Dominion	0	0	Redshirt following ODU's cancellation of 2020 team season							
2021	Old Dominion	11	10	215	1,112	5.2	8	10	55	5.5	1
2022	Old Dominion	11	11	158	918	5.8	5	37	314	8.5	2
2023	Memphis	13	11	192	1,152	6.0	14	53	480	9.1	3
Career		49	34	590	3,298	5.6	28	113	928	8.2	6

== Professional career ==
Pre-draft measurables
Height	Weight	Arm length	Hand span	40-yard dash	10-yard split	20-yard split	20-yard shuttle	Three-cone drill	Vertical jump	Broad jump
5 ft 9 1/2 in (1.77 m)	200 lb (91 kg)	29 7/8 in (0.76 m)	8 3/4 in (0.22 m)	4.40 s	1.55 s	2.47 s	4.32 s	7.13 s	41.5 in (1.05 m)	11 ft 3 in (3.43 m)
All values from Pro Day

=== Denver Broncos ===
Watson signed as an undrafted free agent with the Denver Broncos following the 2024 NFL draft on May 10, 2024. He was also selected by the Memphis Showboats in the second round of the 2024 UFL draft on July 17. Watson notably made the Broncos initial 53-man roster out of training camp as a UDFA.

On October 17, 2024, Watson was waived by the Broncos, and re-signed to the practice squad. On December 24, he was promoted to the active roster.

On August 25, 2025, Watson was waived by the Broncos with a short-term injury settlement after suffering a PCL strain during Week 3 of the preseason against the New Orleans Saints. However, team expressed interest in bringing him back on the practice squad once he had recovered from his injury.

=== Tennessee Titans ===
On September 29, 2025, Watson signed with the Tennessee Titans' practice squad. He signed a reserve/future contract with Tennessee on January 5, 2026.

On April 30, 2026, Watson was waived by the Titans.
