= Zack Kuntz =

American football player (born 1999)

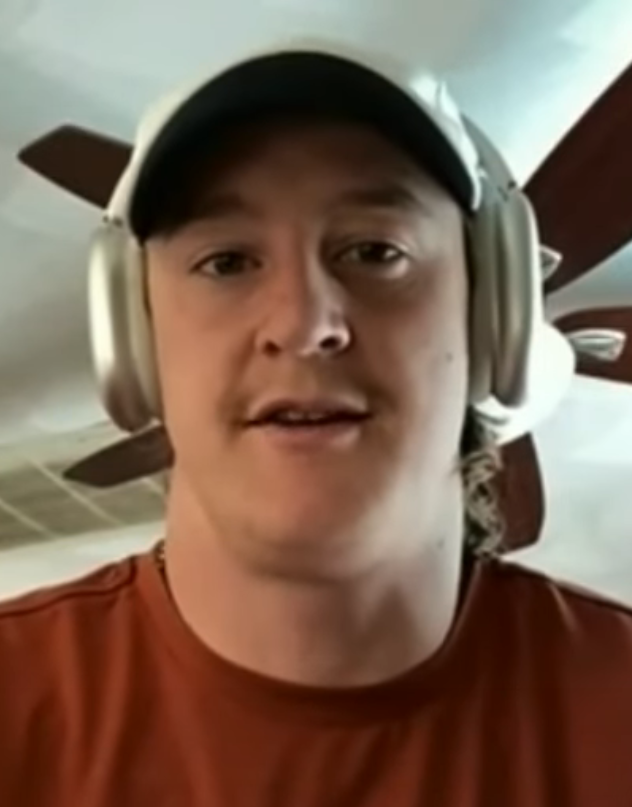
- Kuntz in 2023

Profile
- Position: Tight end

Personal information
- Born: June 4, 1999 (age 27); Harrisburg, Pennsylvania, U.S.
- Listed height: 6 ft 7 in (2.01 m)
- Listed weight: 251 lb (114 kg)

Career information
- High school: Camp Hill (Camp Hill, Pennsylvania)
- College: Penn State (2018–2020); Old Dominion (2021–2022)
- NFL draft: 2023: 7th round, 220th overall pick

Career history
- New York Jets (2023–2024); Miami Dolphins (2026)*; Las Vegas Raiders (2026)*; Dallas Cowboys (2026)*
- * Offseason or practice squad member only

Awards and highlights
- First-team All-Conference USA (2021)
- Stats at Pro Football Reference

Zackary Patrick Kuntz (born June 4, 1999) is an American professional football tight end. He played college football for the Penn State Nittany Lions and Old Dominion Monarchs and was selected by the New York Jets of the National Football League (NFL) in the seventh round of the 2023 NFL draft.

== Early life ==
Kuntz was born on June 6, 1999, in Camp Hill, Pennsylvania. He attended Camp Hill High School, where he was a member of their basketball, football, and track & field teams. He had 49 receptions for 793 yards and 11 touchdowns during his sophomore season. As a senior, Kuntz caught 40 passes for 1,060 yards and nine touchdowns. He also won the Pennsylvania Class AA Championship in the 110-meter hurdles as a junior. Kuntz was rated a four-star recruit and committed to play college football at Penn State over offers from Alabama, Michigan, and Ohio State.

== College career ==
Kuntz enrolled early and joined the Penn State Nittany Lions in January 2018. He played in one game and caught one pass for eight yards before redshirting his true freshman season. Kuntz played in all 13 of Penn State's games, primarily on special teams, and had two receptions for 18 yards on offense.

After his redshirt sophomore season, Kuntz transferred to Old Dominion. In his first season with the Monarchs, he caught 73 passes for 692 yards and five touchdowns and was named first-team All-Conference USA.

== Professional career ==
Pre-draft measurables
Height	Weight	Arm length	Hand span	Wingspan	40-yard dash	10-yard split	20-yard split	20-yard shuttle	Three-cone drill	Vertical jump	Broad jump	Bench press
6 ft 7 3/8 in (2.02 m)	255 lb (116 kg)	34 in (0.86 m)	10 1/4 in (0.26 m)	6 ft 11 1/8 in (2.11 m)	4.55 s	1.57 s	2.61 s	4.12 s	6.87 s	40.0 in (1.02 m)	10 ft 8 in (3.25 m)	23 reps
All values from NFL Combine

=== New York Jets ===
Kuntz was selected in the seventh round of the 2023 NFL draft by the New York Jets. He was waived on August 29, 2023 and re-signed to the practice squad. He was promoted to the active roster on December 27.

On August 27, 2024, Kuntz was waived by the Jets and re-signed to the practice squad. He signed a reserve/future contract with New York on January 6, 2025.

On August 24, 2025, Kuntz was waived by the Jets as part of final roster cuts.

=== Miami Dolphins ===
On January 14, 2026, Kuntz was selected by the DC Defenders of the United Football League (UFL). However, he later signed a futures contract with the Miami Dolphins on February 6. Kuntz was waived by the Dolphins on May 4.

=== Las Vegas Raiders ===
On July 31, 2026, Kuntz signed with the Las Vegas Raiders. He was released by the Raiders on August 5.

=== Dallas Cowboys ===
On August 6, 2026, Kuntz was claimed off waivers by the Dallas Cowboys. On August 30, he was waived by the Cowboys as a part of final roster cuts.
