= 2022 Music City Bowl =

Postseason college football bowl game

2022 TransPerfect Music City Bowl
- 24th Music City Bowl
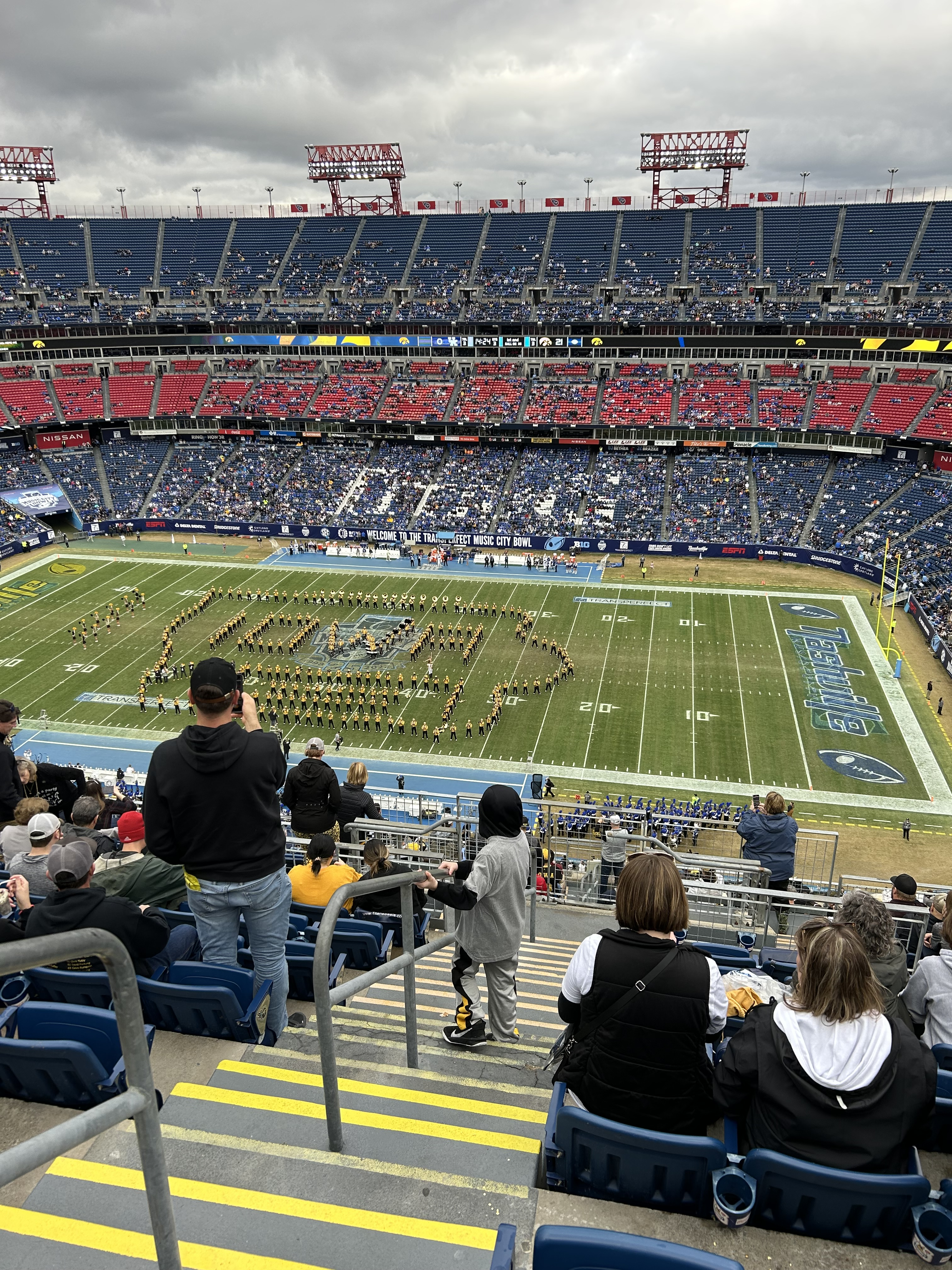
- University of Iowa Marching Band performing at halftime
Iowa Hawkeyes	Kentucky Wildcats
(7–5)	(7–5)
Big Ten	SEC
21	0
Head coach: Kirk Ferentz	Head coach: Mark Stoops
	1	2	3	4	Total
Iowa	0	21	0	0	21
Kentucky	0	0	0	0	0
- Date: December 31, 2022
- Season: 2022
- Stadium: Nissan Stadium
- Location: Nashville, Tennessee
- MVP: Cooper DeJean (DB, Iowa)
- Favorite: Iowa by 2.5
- Referee: Mark Duddy (Pac-12)
- Halftime show: Hawkeye Marching Band, Wildcat Marching Band
- Attendance: 42,312
- Payout: US$5,700,000

United States TV coverage
- Network: ABC
- Announcers: Matt Barrie (play-by-play); Louis Riddick (analyst); Harry Lyles Jr. (sideline)

The 2022 Music City Bowl was a college football bowl game that was played on December 31, 2022, at Nissan Stadium in Nashville, Tennessee. The 24th annual Music City Bowl, featured Iowa from the Big Ten Conference and Kentucky from the Southeastern Conference (SEC). The game began at 11:10 a.m. CST and aired on ABC. It was one of the 2022–23 bowl games concluding the 2022 FBS football season. Sponsored by translation and language services company TransPerfect, the game was officially known as the TransPerfect Music City Bowl.

== Teams ==
The game features Iowa of the Big Ten and Kentucky of the Southeastern Conference (SEC). Both teams received and accepted invitations on December 4, 2022. This is their second-ever meeting—they previously met in a bowl game following the 2021 season, the 2022 Citrus Bowl, won by Kentucky.

=== Iowa Hawkeyes ===
The Hawkeyes played in the Music City Bowl for the first time, and entered the game with a 7–5 record, 5–4 in conference play. They faced two ranked FBS opponents (at the time of the matchup) during the season, losing to No. 4 Michigan and No. 2 Ohio State. The Hawkeyes were led by quarterback Joe Labas, who was making his collegiate debut.

=== Kentucky Wildcats ===
The Wildcats enter the Music City Bowl with a 7–5 record, 3–5 in conference play. Kentucky will be making its sixth appearance in the Music City Bowl. The Wildcats opened their season with four consecutive wins and were ranked as high as No. 7 before losing three of their next four games. They faced six ranked opponents (at the time of the matchup), defeating No. 12 Florida, No. 16 Mississippi State, and No. 25 Louisville while losing to No. 14 Ole Miss, No. 3 Tennessee, and No. 1 Georgia.

== Game summary ==
2022 TransPerfect Music City Bowl

Quarter	1	2	3	4	Total
Iowa	0	21	0	0	21
Kentucky	0	0	0	0	0

at Nissan Stadium • Nashville, Tennessee

- Date: Saturday, December 31, 2022
- Game time: 11:00 a.m. CST
- Game weather: Cloudy• Temperature: 59 °F (15 °C) • Wind: 7 mph (11 km/h) southwest
- Game attendance: 42,312
- Referee: Mark Duddy
- TV announcers (ABC): Matt Barrie, Louis Riddick, Harry Lyles Jr.
- Box score

Scoring summary

Quarter	Time	Drive			Team	Scoring information	Score	
Quarter	Time	Plays	Yards	TOP	Team	Scoring information	Iowa	Kentucky
2	12:08	2	42	0:54	Iowa	Luke Lachey 15-yard touchdown reception from Joey Labas, Drew Stevens kick good	7	0
2	11:57				Iowa	Interception returned 52 yards for touchdown by Xavier Nwankpa, Drew Stevens kick good	14	0
2	1:36				Iowa	Interception returned 14 yards for touchdown by Cooper DeJean, Drew Stevens kick good	21	0
"TOP" = time of possession. For other American football terms, see Glossary of American football.							21	0

== Statistics ==
Team statistical comparison
Statistic	Iowa	Kentucky
First downs	10	10
First downs rushing	3	4
First downs passing	7	6
First downs penalty	0	0
Third down efficiency	0–11	2–18
Fourth down efficiency	0–2	3–5
Total plays–net yards	48–206	69–185
Rushing attempts–net yards	24–67	32–68
Yards per rush	2.8	2.1
Yards passing	139	117
Pass completions–attempts	14–24	22–37
Interceptions thrown	0	2
Punt returns–total yards	3–42	3–25
Kickoff returns–total yards	0–0	1–16
Punts–average yardage	8–48.3	10–40.9
Fumbles–lost	0–0	3–0
Penalties–yards	2–10	3–35
Time of possession	25:43	34:17

Iowa statistics
Hawkeyes passing
	C–A	Yds	TD–INT
Joe Labas	14–24	139	1–0
Hawkeyes rushing
	Car	Yds	TD
Jaziun Patterson	4	23	0
Kaleb Johnson	9	17	0
Joe Labas	4	11	0
Sam LaPorta	2	6	0
Nico Ragaini	1	5	0
Leshon Williams	3	3	0
Diante Vines	1	2	0
Hawkeyes receiving
	Rec	Yds	TD
Sam LaPorta	5	56	0
Luke Lachey	3	36	1
Diante Vines	2	23	0
Nico Ragaini	2	21	0
Leshon Williams	1	2	0
Jaziun Patterson	1	1	0

Kentucky statistics
Wildcats passing
	C–A	Yds	TD–INT
Destin Wade	16–30	98	0–2
Deuce Hogan	6-7	19	0-0
Wildcats rushing
	Car	Yds	TD
JuTahn McClain	10	40	0
Destin Wade	16	29	0
La'Vell Wright	1	6	0
Tayvion Robinson	1	5	0
Dane Key	1	-2	0
Barion Brown	2	-4	0
TEAM	1	-6	0
Wildcats receiving
	Rec	Yds	TD
Dane Key	6	47	0
Tayvion Robinson	5	27	0
Barion Brown	5	24	0
JuTahn McClain	3	7	0
Jordan Dingle	1	6	0
La'Vell Wright	2	6	0
