= 2022 Vanderbilt Commodores football team =

American college football season

2022 Vanderbilt Commodores football
- Conference: Southeastern Conference
- Eastern Division
- Record: 5–7 (2–6 SEC)
- Head coach: Clark Lea (2nd season)
- Offensive coordinator: Joey Lynch (1st season)
- Offensive scheme: Pro spread
- Defensive coordinator: Nick Howell (1st season)
- Base defense: 4–2–5
- Home stadium: FirstBank Stadium

2022 Southeastern Conference football standings
	Conf.			Overall
Team	W		L	W		L
Eastern Division
No. 1 Georgia xy$#^	8	–	0	15	–	0
No. 6 Tennessee	6	–	2	11	–	2
No. 23 South Carolina	4	–	4	8	–	5
Kentucky	3	–	5	7	–	6
Florida	3	–	5	6	–	7
Missouri	3	–	5	6	–	7
Vanderbilt	2	–	6	5	–	7
Western Division
No. 16 LSU xy	6	–	2	10	–	4
No. 5 Alabama x	6	–	2	11	–	2
No. 20 Mississippi State	4	–	4	9	–	4
Ole Miss	4	–	4	8	–	5
Arkansas	3	–	5	7	–	6
Auburn	2	–	6	5	–	7
Texas A&M	2	–	6	5	–	7
Championship: Georgia 50, LSU 30
# – College Football Playoff champion; ^ – College Football Playoff participant; $ – Conference champion; x – Division champion/co-champions; y – Championship game participant; Rankings from AP Poll

The 2022 Vanderbilt Commodores football team represented Vanderbilt University in the 2022 NCAA Division I FBS football season. The Commodores played their home games at Vanderbilt Stadium in Nashville, Tennessee, and competed in the Eastern Division of the Southeastern Conference (SEC). They were led by second-year head coach Clark Lea.

Vanderbilt started the season off with a 2–0 record for the first time in four years.

== Schedule ==
Vanderbilt and the SEC announced the 2022 football schedule on September 21, 2021.

Date	Time	Opponent	Site	TV	Result	Attendance
August 27	9:30 p.m.	at Hawaii*	Clarence T. C. Ching Athletics Complex; Honolulu, HI	CBSSN	W 63–10	9,346
September 3	6:00 p.m.	Elon*	FirstBank Stadium; Nashville, TN	SECN+/ESPN+	W 42–31	20,120
September 10	11:00 a.m.	No. 23 Wake Forest*	FirstBank Stadium; Nashville, TN (SEC Nation)	SECN	L 25–45	24,431
September 17	2:30 p.m.	at Northern Illinois*	Huskie Stadium; DeKalb, IL	CBSSN	W 38–28	14,110
September 24	6:30 p.m.	at No. 2 Alabama	Bryant–Denny Stadium; Tuscaloosa, AL	SECN	L 3–55	96,246
October 8	3:00 p.m.	No. 9 Ole Miss	FirstBank Stadium; Nashville, TN (rivalry)	SECN	L 28–52	31,567
October 15	2:30 p.m.	at No. 1 Georgia	Sanford Stadium; Athens, GA (rivalry)	SECN	L 0–55	92,746
October 22	3:00 p.m.	at Missouri	Faurot Field; Columbia, MO	SECN	L 14–17	60,618
November 5	6:30 p.m.	South Carolina	FirstBank Stadium; Nashville, TN	SECN	L 27–38	28,553
November 12	11:00 a.m.	at No. 24 Kentucky	Kroger Field; Lexington, KY (rivalry)	SECN	W 24–21	57,474
November 19	11:00 a.m.	Florida	FirstBank Stadium; Nashville, TN	SECN	W 31–24	30,136
November 26	6:30 p.m.	No. 10 Tennessee	FirstBank Stadium; Nashville, TN (rivalry)	SECN	L 0–56	40,350
*Non-conference game; Rankings from AP Poll (and CFP Rankings, after November 1) - Released prior to game; All times are in Central time

== Game summaries ==
=== At Hawaii ===
	1	2	3	4	Total
Commodores	14	7	35	7	63
Rainbow Warriors	7	3	0	0	10

Statistics	VAN	HAW
First downs	28	20
Total yards	601	358
Rushing yards	404	108
Passing yards	197	250
Turnovers	0	2
Time of possession	31:03	28:57

Team	Category	Player	Statistics
Vanderbilt	Passing	Mike Wright	13/21, 146 yards, 2 TD
Vanderbilt	Rushing	Mike Wright	13 rushes, 163 yards, 2 TD
Vanderbilt	Receiving	Will Sheppard	3 receptions, 39 yards, 2 TD
Hawaii	Passing	Brayden Schager	18/35, 161 yards
Hawaii	Rushing	Dedrick Parson	13 rushes, 82 yards, TD
Hawaii	Receiving	Jonah Panoke	7 receptions, 101 yards

=== Elon ===
	1	2	3	4	Total
Phoenix	7	3	14	7	31
Commodores	21	7	7	7	42

Statistics	ELON	VAN
First downs	23	17
Total yards	495	424
Rushing yards	152	179
Passing yards	343	245
Turnovers	1	0
Time of possession	34:29	25:27

Team	Category	Player	Statistics
Elon	Passing	Matthew McKay	19/32, 333 yards, 2 TD
Elon	Rushing	Matthew McKay	13 rushes, 52 yards, 2 TD
Elon	Receiving	Jackson Parham	8 receptions, 143 yards, TD
Vanderbilt	Passing	Mike Wright	18/29, 245 yards, 4 TD
Vanderbilt	Rushing	Ray Davis	20 rushes, 95 yards
Vanderbilt	Receiving	Jayden McGowan	4 receptions, 118 yards, TD

=== No. 23 Wake Forest ===
	1	2	3	4	Total
No. 23 Demon Deacons	14	7	14	10	45
Commodores	3	7	8	7	25

Statistics	WAKE	VAN
First downs	21	11
Total yards	451	294
Rushing yards	151	113
Passing yards	300	181
Turnovers	1	3
Time of possession	30:13	29:47

Team	Category	Player	Statistics
Wake Forest	Passing	Sam Hartman	18/27, 300 yards, 4 TD
Wake Forest	Rushing	Quinton Cooley	9 rushes, 57 yards, TD
Wake Forest	Receiving	A. T. Perry	5 receptions, 142 yards, TD
Vanderbilt	Passing	AJ Swann	8/11, 146 yards, 2 TD
Vanderbilt	Rushing	Ray Davis	18 rushes, 87 yards, TD
Vanderbilt	Receiving	Jayden McGowan	3 receptions, 56 yards

=== At Northern Illinois ===
	1	2	3	4	Total
Commodores	7	7	21	3	38
Huskies	7	14	7	0	28

Statistics	VAN	NIU
First downs	21	17
Total yards	428	354
Rushing yards	173	151
Passing yards	255	203
Turnovers	1	1
Time of possession	30:39	29:21

Team	Category	Player	Statistics
Vanderbilt	Passing	AJ Swann	18/28, 255 yards, 4 TD
Vanderbilt	Rushing	Ray Davis	23 rushes, 116 yards, TD
Vanderbilt	Receiving	Will Sheppard	10 receptions, 171 yards, TD
Northern Illinois	Passing	Ethan Hampton	12/19, 124 yards, 2 TD, INT
Northern Illinois	Rushing	Antario Brown	8 rushes, 60 yards, TD
Northern Illinois	Receiving	Cole Tucker	4 receptions, 88 yards, 2 TD

=== At No. 2 Alabama ===
	1	2	3	4	Total
Commodores	3	0	0	0	3
No. 2 Crimson Tide	14	17	10	14	55

Statistics	VAN	ALA
First downs	9	34
Total yards	129	628
Rushing yards	14	228
Passing yards	115	400
Turnovers	0	1
Time of possession	27:43	32:17

Team	Category	Player	Statistics
Vanderbilt	Passing	AJ Swann	13/26, 115 yards
Vanderbilt	Rushing	Rocko Griffin	3 rushes, 19 yards
Vanderbilt	Receiving	Will Sheppard	3 receptions, 52 yards
Alabama	Passing	Bryce Young	25/36, 385 yards, 4 TD
Alabama	Rushing	Jase McClellan	11 rushes, 78 yards, TD
Alabama	Receiving	Ja'Corey Brooks	6 receptions, 117 yards, 2 TD

=== No. 9 Ole Miss ===
	1	2	3	4	Total
No. 9 Rebels	3	14	21	14	52
Commodores	3	17	0	8	28

Statistics	MISS	VAN
First downs	22	21
Total yards	591	403
Rushing yards	143	122
Passing yards	448	281
Turnovers	2	1
Time of possession	18:43	41:17

Team	Category	Player	Statistics
Ole Miss	Passing	Jaxson Dart	25/32, 448 yards, 3 TD, 2 INT
Ole Miss	Rushing	Zach Evans	11 rushes, 80 yards, TD
Ole Miss	Receiving	Jonathan Mingo	9 receptions, 247 yards, 2 TD
Vanderbilt	Passing	AJ Swann	27/38, 281 yards, 2 TD
Vanderbilt	Rushing	Ray Davis	27 rushes, 105 yards, TD
Vanderbilt	Receiving	Jayden McGowan	7 receptions, 104 yards, TD

=== At No. 1 Georgia ===
	1	2	3	4	Total
Commodores	0	0	0	0	0
No. 1 Bulldogs	14	14	6	21	55

Statistics	VAN	UGA
First downs	10	30
Total yards	150	579
Rushing yards	45	192
Passing yards	105	387
Turnovers	1	0
Time of possession	21:00	39:00

Team	Category	Player	Statistics
Vanderbilt	Passing	AJ Swann	12/23, 105 yards
Vanderbilt	Rushing	Ray Davis	12 rushes, 29 yards
Vanderbilt	Receiving	Will Sheppard	3 receptions, 45 yards
Georgia	Passing	Stetson Bennett	24/30, 289 yards, 2 TD
Georgia	Rushing	Daijun Edwards	10 rushes, 49 yards, TD
Georgia	Receiving	Darnell Washington	4 receptions, 78 yards

=== At Missouri ===
	1	2	3	4	Total
Commodores	0	0	7	7	14
Tigers	7	10	0	0	17

Statistics	VAN	MIZ
First downs	16	19
Total yards	299	308
Rushing yards	57	97
Passing yards	242	211
Turnovers	1	4
Time of possession	31:03	28:57

Team	Category	Player	Statistics
Vanderbilt	Passing	Mike Wright	9/15, 127 yards, TD
Vanderbilt	Rushing	Ray Davis	15 rushes, 28 yards
Vanderbilt	Receiving	Gamarion Carter	1 reception, 80 yards, TD
Missouri	Passing	Brady Cook	17/25, 211 yards, TD, INT
Missouri	Rushing	Cody Schrader	14 rushes, 84 yards
Missouri	Receiving	Luther Burden III	4 receptions, 66 yards, TD

=== South Carolina ===
	1	2	3	4	Total
Gamecocks	17	14	7	0	38
Commodores	7	7	7	6	27

Statistics	SC	VAN
First downs	17	24
Total yards	492	454
Rushing yards	208	226
Passing yards	284	228
Turnovers	1	4
Time of possession	29:13	30:47

Team	Category	Player	Statistics
South Carolina	Passing	Spencer Rattler	18/26, 200 yards, 3 TD
South Carolina	Rushing	Jaheim Bell	16 rushes, 56 yards
South Carolina	Receiving	Antwane Wells Jr.	4 receptions, 110 yards, 2 TD
Vanderbilt	Passing	AJ Swann	10/18, 127 yards, 2 TD, INT
Vanderbilt	Rushing	Ray Davis	20 rushes, 167 yards
Vanderbilt	Receiving	Will Sheppard	6 receptions, 95 yards

=== At No. 24 Kentucky ===
	1	2	3	4	Total
Commodores	7	0	7	10	24
No. 24 Wildcats	6	0	3	12	21

Statistics	VAN	UK
First downs	18	16
Total yards	448	322
Rushing yards	264	213
Passing yards	184	109
Turnovers	2	1
Time of possession	33:15	26:45

Team	Category	Player	Statistics
Vanderbilt	Passing	Mike Wright	12/23, 184 yards, TD, INT
Vanderbilt	Rushing	Ray Davis	26 rushes, 129 yards, TD
Vanderbilt	Receiving	Will Sheppard	5 receptions, 88 yards, TD
Kentucky	Passing	Will Levis	11/23, 109 yards, INT
Kentucky	Rushing	Chris Rodriguez Jr.	18 rushes, 162 yards, 2 TD
Kentucky	Receiving	Tayvion Robinson	5 receptions, 49 yards

=== Florida ===
	1	2	3	4	Total
Gators	3	3	6	12	24
Commodores	0	14	14	3	31

Statistics	FLA	VAN
First downs	20	18
Total yards	445	283
Rushing yards	45	175
Passing yards	400	108
Turnovers	2	2
Time of possession	26:34	33:26

Team	Category	Player	Statistics
Florida	Passing	Anthony Richardson	25/42, 400 yards, 3 TD, INT
Florida	Rushing	Montrell Johnson Jr.	11 rushes, 32 yards
Florida	Receiving	Daejon Reynolds	8 receptions, 165 yards, 2 TD
Vanderbilt	Passing	Mike Wright	10/16, 108 yards, 3 TD, INT
Vanderbilt	Rushing	Ray Davis	30 rushes, 122 yards
Vanderbilt	Receiving	Ben Bresnahan	1 reception, 28 yards, TD

=== No. 10 Tennessee ===
	1	2	3	4	Total
No. 10 Volunteers	14	7	21	14	56
Commodores	0	0	0	0	0

Statistics	TENN	VAN
First downs	16	17
Total yards	513	254
Rushing yards	362	147
Passing yards	151	107
Turnovers	1	0
Time of possession	16:15	43:45

Team	Category	Player	Statistics
Tennessee	Passing	Joe Milton	11/21, 147 yards, TD
Tennessee	Rushing	Jaylen Wright	5 rushes, 160 yards, 2 TD
Tennessee	Receiving	Jalin Hyatt	3 receptions, 86 yards
Vanderbilt	Passing	AJ Swann	11/17, 79 yards
Vanderbilt	Rushing	Ray Davis	21 rushes, 60 yards
Vanderbilt	Receiving	Will Sheppard	6 receptions, 48 yards

== Coaching staff ==
Name	Position	Consecutive season at Vanderbilt in current position
Clark Lea	Head coach	2nd
Joey Lynch	Offensive coordinator/quarterbacks	2nd
Nick Howell	Defensive coordinator/DBs coach	1st
Justin Lustig	Associate head coach/special teams coordinator/tight ends coach	2nd
A.J. Blazek	Offensive line coach	2nd
Norval McKenzie	Run game coordinator/running backs coach	2nd
Alex Bailey	Wide receivers	1st
Jovan Haye	Defensive ends coach	2nd
Larry Black	Defensive tackles coach	1st
Nick Lezynski	Linebackers coach	1st
Dan Jackson	Safeties coach	1st
