= 2022 Iowa Hawkeyes football team =

American college football season

2022 Iowa Hawkeyes football

Music City Bowl champion

Music City Bowl, W 21–0 vs. Kentucky
- Conference: Big Ten Conference
- West Division
- Record: 8–5 (5–4 Big Ten)
- Head coach: Kirk Ferentz (24th season)
- Offensive coordinator: Brian Ferentz (6th season)
- Offensive scheme: Multiple
- Defensive coordinator: Phil Parker (11th season)
- Base defense: 4–2–5
- Captains: Jack Campbell; Riley Moss; Sam LaPorta; Cooper DeJean
- Home stadium: Kinnick Stadium

2022 Big Ten Conference football standings
	Conf.			Overall
Team	W		L	W		L
East Division
No. 3 Michigan xy$^	9	–	0	13	–	1
No. 4 Ohio State ^	8	–	1	11	–	2
No. 7 Penn State	7	–	2	11	–	2
Maryland	4	–	5	8	–	5
Indiana	2	–	7	4	–	8
Rutgers	1	–	8	4	–	8
Michigan State†	0	–	6	0	–	7
West Division
Purdue xy	6	–	3	8	–	6
Illinois	5	–	4	8	–	5
Iowa	5	–	4	8	–	5
Minnesota	5	–	4	9	–	4
Wisconsin	4	–	5	7	–	6
Nebraska	3	–	6	4	–	8
Northwestern	1	–	8	1	–	11
Championship: Michigan 43, Purdue 22
^ – College Football Playoff participant; $ – Conference champion; x – Division champion/co-champions; y – Championship game participant; † — NCAA vacated all wins for Michigan State (5–7, 3–6); Rankings from AP Poll

Iowa State Cyclone Xavier Hutchinson (8) hauls in a touchdown pass to put the Cyclones up 9-7 against Iowa at Kinnick Stadium in 2022

The 2022 Iowa Hawkeyes football team represented the University of Iowa as member of the West Division of the Big Ten Conference during the 2022 NCAA Division I FBS football season. Led by 24th-year head coach Kirk Ferentz, the Hawkeyes played home games at Kinnick Stadium in Iowa City, Iowa.

Floundering after a 3–4 start, the Hawkeyes won four straight games to position themselves for a return trip to the Big Ten Championship game and repeat as Big Ten West champions. A disappointing season finale at home against Nebraska spoiled those plans, but Iowa capped the 2022 season with a dominating 21–0 win over Kentucky in the Music City Bowl – avenging their bowl loss from the previous season. The Hawkeyes finished with a record of 8–5 (5–4 B1G).

Senior linebacker Jack Campbell was named Nagurski–Woodson Defensive Player of the Year, a Unanimous First-team All-American, and the 2022 Butkus Award winner as the nation's top linebacker. He later became the 13th Iowa player of the Ferentz era taken in the first round of the NFL Draft. Third-year defensive lineman Lukas Van Ness was selected five picks prior to Campbell, marking the second time in five years two Hawkeyes were selected in the first 20 picks of the NFL draft (2019).

== Preseason ==
On January 14, 2022, Kirk Ferentz's contract was extended through the 2029 season. On March 2, 2022, Iowa announced the hire of Abdul Hodge, previously the linebackers coach at South Dakota, as its tight ends coach. Offensive coordinator Brian Ferentz took over as quarterbacks coach, after previous quarterbacks coach Ken O'Keefe stepped down. "Man, I got a lot to learn," Brian Ferentz told media about adjusting to coaching quarterbacks after his appointment in May 2022. Former Wisconsin quarterback and Colorado State offensive coordinator Jon Budmayr joined the Hawkeyes as an offensive analyst that would assist Brian Ferentz with the quarterbacks.

During the offseason, two Hawkeye wide receivers transferred to West division rival Purdue. Starters Tyrone Tracy, second on the team in receiving yards in 2019, and Charlie Jones, the 2021 Big Ten Returner of the Year, would both play 2022 with the Boilermakers. After struggling as a starter in 2020 and 2021, quarterback Spencer Petras won a supposed quarterback competition against Alex Padilla and Joe Labas.

The Hawkeyes were ranked second in the West Division in the preseason Big Ten media poll, behind Wisconsin and ahead of Minnesota. Linebacker Jack Campbell was selected as the media's preseason Defensive Player of the Year, finishing ahead of Wisconsin linebacker Nick Herbig. The Hawkeyes received votes, but were unranked in the preseason AP Poll and Coaches Poll.

Kirk Ferentz named Campbell, cornerback Riley Moss, tight end Sam LaPorta, and safety Kaevon Merriweather as captains before the week 1 game against South Dakota State and would remain team captains through the regular season.

== Schedule ==
Iowa announced its 2022 football schedule on January 12, 2022. The 2022 schedule consisted of seven home games and five away games in the regular season. The Hawkeyes hosted Big Ten foes Michigan, Northwestern, Wisconsin, and Nebraska and traveled to Rutgers, Illinois, Ohio State, Purdue, and Minnesota.

The Hawkeyes hosted all three non-conference opponents, South Dakota State from Division I FCS, Iowa State from the Big 12 and Nevada from the Mountain West. This marked the first season since 2011 that the entire home schedule was sold out. The first game of the season was played against the eventual FCS National Champion.

Date	Time	Opponent	Site	TV	Result	Attendance
September 3	11:00 a.m.	No. 2 (FCS) South Dakota State*	Kinnick Stadium; Iowa City, IA	FS1	W 7–3	69,250
September 10	3:00 p.m.	Iowa State*	Kinnick Stadium; Iowa City, IA (rivalry)	BTN	L 7–10	69,250
September 17	6:30 p.m.	Nevada*	Kinnick Stadium; Iowa City, IA	BTN	W 27–0	69,250
September 24	6:00 p.m.	at Rutgers	SHI Stadium; Piscataway, NJ	FS1	W 27–10	53,117
October 1	11:00 a.m.	No. 4 Michigan	Kinnick Stadium; Iowa City, IA (Big Noon Kickoff)	FOX	L 14–27	69,250
October 8	6:30 p.m.	at Illinois	Memorial Stadium; Champaign, IL	BTN	L 6–9	44,910
October 22	11:00 a.m.	at No. 2 Ohio State	Ohio Stadium; Columbus, OH (Big Noon Kickoff)	FOX	L 10–54	104,848
October 29	2:30 p.m.	Northwestern^{†}	Kinnick Stadium; Iowa City, IA	ESPN2	W 33–13	69,250
November 5	11:00 a.m.	at Purdue	Ross–Ade Stadium; West Lafayette, IN	FS1	W 24–3	61,320
November 12	2:30 p.m.	Wisconsin	Kinnick Stadium; Iowa City, IA (rivalry)	FS1	W 24–10	69,250
November 19	3:00 p.m.	at Minnesota	Huntington Bank Stadium; Minneapolis, MN (rivalry)	FOX	W 13–10	45,816
November 25	3:00 p.m.	Nebraska	Kinnick Stadium; Iowa City, IA (rivalry)	BTN	L 17–24	69,250
December 31	11:00 a.m.	Kentucky*	Nissan Stadium; Nashville, TN (Music City Bowl)	ABC	W 21–0	42,312
*Non-conference game; ^{†}Homecoming; Rankings from AP Poll released prior to the game; All times are in Central time

== Roster ==
2022 Iowa Hawkeyes football team roster
Players
Coaches
Offense

Pos.	#	Name	Class
QB	5	Joe Labas	Fr
QB	3	Carson May	Fr
QB	8	Alex Padilla	Jr
QB	7	Spencer Petras	Sr
RB	34	Zach Brand	Fr
RB	22	Nolan Donald	Jr
RB	20	Deavin Hilson	Fr
RB	2	Kaleb Johnson	Fr
RB	9	Jaziun Patterson	Fr
RB	17	Max White	Fr
RB	25	Gavin Williams	So
RB	4	Leshon Williams	So
FB	42	Denin Limouris	Fr
FB	40	Turner Pallissard	Sr
FB	32	Johnny Plewa	Jr
FB	38	Monte Pottebaum	Sr
WR	15	Jacob Bostick	Fr
WR	14	Brody Brecht	Fr
WR	10	Arland Bruce IV	So
WR	83	Alex Eichmann	Fr
WR	19	Graham Friedrichsen	Fr
WR	27	Jack Johnson	So
WR	6	Keagan Johnson	So
WR	16	Jordan Kumm	So
WR	13	Reese Osgood	Fr
WR	89	Nico Ragaini	Sr
WR	29	Jackson Ritter (injured)	Jr
WR	0	Diante Vines	So
WR	21	Kaden Wetjen	So
WR	18	Alec Wick	Fr
TE	88	Jackson Frericks	Jr
TE	85	Luke Lachey	So
TE	84	Sam LaPorta	Sr
TE	49	Andrew Lentsch	Fr
TE	87	Addison Ostrenga	Fr
TE	82	Johnny Pascuzzi	Fr
TE	86	Steven Stilianos	Jr
TE	80	Kyson Van Vugt	Fr
TE	81	Cael Vanderbush	Fr
OL	63	Justin Britt	Jr
OL	66	Jeremy Chaplin	Fr
OL	77	Connor Colby	So
OL	73	David Davidkov	Fr
OL	56	Nick DeJong	Jr
OL	71	Jack Dotzler	Fr
OL	67	Gennings Dunker	Fr
OL	76	Tyler Elsbury	So
OL	69	Tyler Endres	Jr
OL	54	Matt Fagan	Sr
OL	52	Asher Fahey	So
DL	58	Taylor Fox	Jr
C	65	Logan Jones	So
OL	72	Kale Krogh	Fr
OL	59	Griffin Liddle	Fr
OL	53	Michael Myslinski	Fr
OT	79	Jack Plumb	Sr
OL	78	Mason Richman	So
OL	70	Beau Stephens	Fr
OL	75	Josh Volk	So

Defense

Pos.	#	Name	Class
DE	90	Brian Allen	Fr
DE	13	Joe Evans	Sr
DL	94	Yahya Black	So
DL	86	Jeff Bowie	Fr
DL	45	Deontae Craig	So
DL	97	Caden Crawford	Fr
DL	93	Anu Dokun	So
DL	51	Luke Gaffney	Fr
DL	95	Aaron Graves	Fr
DL	57	Will Hubert	Fr
DL	49	Ethan Hurkett	So
DL	87	Andrew Kraus	Fr
DL	48	Max Llewellyn	Fr
DT	85	Logan Lee	Jr
DL	55	Jeremiah Pittman	Fr
DL	98	Chris Reames	Jr
DT	99	Noah Shannon	Sr
DL	50	Louie Stec	Jr
DL	91	Lukas Van Ness	So
DE	92	John Waggoner	Sr
DL	54	Dominic Wiseman	Fr
DL	83	Jameson Witte	So
LB	44	Seth Benson	Sr
LB	31	Jack Campbell	Sr
LB	39	Eric Epenesa	Fr
LB	38	Greg Fagan	Fr
LB	37	Kyler Fisher	Jr
LB	41	Jaden Harrell	Fr
LB	34	Jay Higgins	Jr
LB	5	Jestin Jacobs (injured)	Jr
LB	46	Logan Klemp	Sr
LB	32	Eli Miller	Fr
LB	36	Jayden Montgomery	Fr
LB	43	Karson Sharar	Fr
LB	40	Josef Smith	So
LB	35	Justice Sullivan	Fr
LB	25	Kelby Telander	Fr
LB	42	Zach Twedt	Fr
LB	23	Landyn Van Kekerix	Fr
DB	7	Reggie Bracy	Jr
DB	29	Sebastian Castro	Jr
DB	19	Gaven Cooke	Fr
DB	15	Dallas Craddieth	Sr
DB	17	Brenden Deasfernandes	So
DB	3	Cooper DeJean	So
DB	4	Koen Entringer	Fr
DB	22	Carter Erickson	Fr
DB	6	TJ Hall	Fr
CB	27	Jermari Harris (injured)	Jr
DB	21	Thomas Hartlieb	Jr
DB	16	Jamison Heinz	So
DB	20	Kael Kolarik	Fr
DB	11	AJ Lawson	So
DB	8	Deshaun Lee	Fr
S	26	Kaevon Merriweather	Sr
CB	33	Riley Moss	Sr
DB	1	Xavier Nwankpa	Fr
DB	12	Jaxon Rexroth	Fr
CB	2	Terry Roberts	Sr
S	30	Quinn Schulte	Jr

Special teams

Pos.	#	Name	Class
K	96	Lucas Amaya	Jr
K	1	Aaron Blom	So
K	18	Drew Stevens	Fr
P	99	Max Hoskins	Fr
P	9	Tory Taylor	Jr
P	45	Nick Phelps	Sr
LS	39	Luke Elkin	So
LS	97	Liam Reardon	So

Head coach

- Kirk Ferentz

Coordinators/assistant coaches

- Brian Ferentz – Offensive coordinator/quarterbacks
- Phil Parker – Defensive coordinator/secondary
- LeVar Woods – Special teams coordinator
- George Barnett – Offensive line
- Kelvin Bell – Defensive line
- Ladell Betts – Running backs
- Kelton Copeland – Wide receivers
- Abdul Hodge – Tight ends/fullbacks
- Jay Niemann – Assistant defensive line/defensive recruiting coordinator
- Seth Wallace – Assistant defensive coordinator/linebackers
- Raimond Braithwaite – Director, strength and conditioning
- Drew Heitland – Assistant, strength and conditioning
- Kohle Helle – Assistant, strength and conditioning
- Cody Myers – Assistant, strength and conditioning
- John Engelbrecht – Nutrition & Performance Analytics
- Paul Federici – Director, football operations
- Ben Hansen – Director of football administration and engagement
- Jason Manson – Director of player development
- Sam Brincks – Assistant director, player development
- Scott Southmayd – Director, player personnel
- Tyler Barnes – Director, recruiting/nfl liaison
- Matt Spaulding – Football recruiting specialist
- Ireland Hostetler – Recruiting Operations and Special Events Coordinator
- Ken O'Keefe –
- Caleb Saunders – Director, football creative media
- Justin Elsner – Assistant director, football creative media
- Eric Copeland – Graduate assistant
- Adam Cox – Graduate assistant
- Justin Flood – Graduate assistant
- Jordan Walsh – Graduate assistant
- Austin Showalter – Director, football analytics
- Tyler Parker – Football analyst
- Shane Viilo – Football analyst
- Jon Budmayr – Football analyst
- Bob Rahfeldt – Director, football video operations
- Kammy Powell – Head Football Athletic Trainer

Legend

- (C) Team captain
- (S) Suspended
- (I) Ineligible
- Injured
- Redshirt

Roster
Last update: 10/24/22

== Game summaries ==
=== No. 2 (FCS) South Dakota State ===
No. 2 (FCS) South Dakota State at Iowa

Team	1	2	3	4	Total
No. 2 (FCS) Jackrabbits	0	3	0	0	3
• Hawkeyes	3	0	2	2	7

- Date: September 3
- Location:
  Kinnick Stadium
  Iowa City, IA
- Game start: 11:05 a.m. CDT
- Elapsed time: 3:32
- Game attendance: 69,250
- Game weather: 77 °F (25 °C), Cloudy, Wind NW 6 mph (9.7 km/h)
- Referee: Michael Cannon
- TV announcers (FS1): Noah Eagle (play-by-play) and Mark Helfrich (analyst)
- Source: Box Score

Scoring summary
1	1:11	Iowa	Aaron Blom 46-yard field goal	Iowa 3–0
2	0:20	SDSU	Hunter Dustman 44-yard field goal	Tied 3–3
3	4:09	Iowa	Safety, Isaiah Davis run for -1 yard	Iowa 5–3
4	4:04	Iowa	Safety, Mark Gronowski sacked in end zone by Joe Evans	Iowa 7–3

Iowa relied almost entirely on defense and special teams to earn a hard-fought victory over FCS foe South Dakota State. The Jacks were only able to muster 120 total yards, in large part due to poor starting field position the entire day. Two such drives ended with the Iowa defense forcing a safety, proving to be the difference in the game. The teams combined for 21 punts for 936 yards. Iowa's Tory Taylor pinned SDSU inside their own 20 on 7 of his 10 punts, earning him B1G Special Teams Player of the Week honors.

Statistics	SDSU	IOWA
First downs	6	10
Total yards	120	166
Rushing yards	33	57
Passing yards	87	109
Turnovers	0	2
Time of possession	29:44	30:11

Team	Category	Player	Statistics
South Dakota State	Passing	Mark Gronowski	10/26, 87 yards
South Dakota State	Rushing	Isaiah Davis	18 rushes, 50 yards
South Dakota State	Receiving	Isaiah Davis	5 receptions, 32 yards
Iowa	Passing	Spencer Petras	11/25, 109 yards, INT
Iowa	Rushing	Leshon Williams	24 rushes, 72 yards
Iowa	Receiving	Arland Bruce IV	5 receptions, 68 yards

=== Iowa State ===
Iowa State at Iowa
Cy-Hawk Trophy

Team	1	2	3	4	Total
• Cyclones	0	3	0	7	10
Hawkeyes	7	0	0	0	7

- Date: September 10
- Location:
  Kinnick Stadium
  Iowa City, IA
- Game start: 3:05 p.m. CDT
- Elapsed time: 3:11
- Game attendance: 69,250
- Game weather: 70 °F (21 °C), Cloudy; Rain in Q4, Wind N 9 mph (14 km/h)
- Referee: Tuta Salaam
- TV announcers (BTN): Brandon Gaudin (play-by-play), Anthony Herron (analyst), and Rick Pizzo (sideline)
- Source: Box Score

Scoring summary
1	12:21	Iowa	Leshon Williams 9-yard run (Aaron Blom kick)	Iowa 7–0
2	3:45	ISU	Jace Gilbert 22-yard field goal	Iowa 7–3
4	8:27	ISU	Xavier Hutchinson 8-yard pass from Hunter Dekkers (Jace Gilbert kick)	ISU 10–7

Iowa State ended a six-game skid in the series. Sophomore Lukas Van Ness blocked two punts and was named B1G Special Teams Player of the Week.

Statistics	ISU	IOWA
First downs	21	11
Total yards	313	150
Rushing yards	129	58
Passing yards	184	92
Turnovers	3	3
Time of possession	38:15	21:45

Team	Category	Player	Statistics
Iowa State	Passing	Hunter Dekkers	25/38, 184 yards, TD, 2 INT
Iowa State	Rushing	Jirehl Brock	27 rushes, 100 yards
Iowa State	Receiving	Xavier Hutchinson	11 receptions, 98 yards, TD
Iowa	Passing	Spencer Petras	12/26, 92 yards, INT
Iowa	Rushing	Leshon Williams	14 rushes, 34 yards, TD
Iowa	Receiving	Sam LaPorta	8 receptions, 55 yards

=== Nevada ===
Nevada at Iowa

Team	1	2	3	4	Total
Wolf Pack	0	0	0	0	0
• Hawkeyes	14	3	3	7	27

- Date: September 17
- Location:
  Kinnick Stadium
  Iowa City, IA
- Game start: 6:40 p.m. CDT
- Elapsed time: 6:58
- Game attendance: 69,250
- Game weather: 72 °F (22 °C), Rain, Wind SE 7 mph (11 km/h)
- Referee: David Siegle
- TV announcers (BTN): Mark Followill (play-by-play), Matt Millen, (analyst), and Meghan McKeown (sideline)
- Source: Box Score

Scoring summary
1	4:36	Iowa	Kaleb Johnson 40-yard run (Drew Stevens kick)	Iowa 7–0
1	0:23	Iowa	Arland Bruce IV 21-yard pass from Spencer Petras (Drew Stevens kick)	Iowa 14–0
2	9:42	Iowa	Drew Stevens 43-yard field goal	Iowa 17–0
3	2:40	Iowa	Drew Stevens 33-yard field goal	Iowa 20–0
4	8:22	Iowa	Kaleb Johnson 55-yard run (Drew Stevens kick)	Iowa 27–0

After enduring three separate lightning delays totaling 3 hours and 56 minutes, Iowa closed out their non-conference schedule with a 27-point win in the first meeting between the schools.

Statistics	NEV	IOWA
First downs	10	15
Total yards	151	337
Rushing yards	69	162
Passing yards	82	175
Turnovers	1	0
Time of possession	30:03	29:57

Team	Category	Player	Statistics
Nevada	Passing	Shane Illingworth	14/28, 82 yards, INT
Nevada	Rushing	Devonte Lee	9 carries, 33 yards
Nevada	Receiving	Dalevon Campbell	3 receptions, 21 yards
Iowa	Passing	Spencer Petras	14/26, 175 yards, TD
Iowa	Rushing	Kaleb Johnson	7 carries, 103 yards, 2 TD
Iowa	Receiving	Arland Bruce IV	3 receptions, 50 yards, TD

=== At Rutgers ===
Iowa at Rutgers

Team	1	2	3	4	Total
• Hawkeyes	7	10	7	3	27
Scarlet Knights	3	0	0	7	10

- Date: September 24
- Location: SHI Stadium
  Piscataway, NJ
- Game start: 7:10 p.m. EDT
- Elapsed time: 3:10
- Game attendance: 53,117
- Game weather: 68 °F (20 °C), Sunny, Wind W 7 mph (11 km/h)
- Referee: Larry Smith
- TV announcers (FS1): Noah Eagle (play-by-play) and Mark Helfrich (analyst)
- Source: Box Score

Scoring summary
1	10:14	Rutgers	Jude McAtamney 28-yard field goal	Rutgers 3–0
1	5:26	Iowa	Cooper DeJean 45-yard interception return (Drew Stevens kick)	Iowa 7–3
2	8:28	Iowa	Kaevon Merriweather 30-yard fumble return (Drew Stevens kick)	Iowa 14–3
2	0:21	Iowa	Drew Stevens 25-yard field goal	Iowa 17–3
3	10:09	Iowa	Leshon Williams 2-yard run (Drew Stevens kick)	Iowa 24–3
4	11:15	Rutgers	Aron Cruickshank 18-yard pass from Evan Simon (Jude McAtamney kick)	Iowa 24–10
4	6:08	Iowa	Drew Stevens 51-yard field goal	Iowa 27–10

In their B1G opener, Iowa scored two defensive touchdowns in the first half to pick up a win on the road and moved to 3–0 all-time versus Rutgers.

Statistics	IOWA	RUTG
First downs	14	20
Total yards	277	361
Rushing yards	129	61
Passing yards	148	300
Turnovers	0	3
Time of possession	29:22	30:38

Team	Category	Player	Statistics
Iowa	Passing	Spencer Petras	11/17, 148 yards
Iowa	Rushing	Leshon Williams	11 carries, 64 yards, TD
Iowa	Receiving	Sam LaPorta	4 receptions, 77 yards
Rutgers	Passing	Evan Simon	28/49, 300 yards, TD, 2 INT
Rutgers	Rushing	Samuel Brown V	6 carries, 34 yards
Rutgers	Receiving	Shameen Jones	5 receptions, 71 yards

=== No. 4 Michigan ===
No. 4 Michigan at Iowa

Team	1	2	3	4	Total
• No. 4 Wolverines	7	6	7	7	27
Hawkeyes	0	0	0	14	14

- Date: October 1
- Location: Kinnick Stadium
  Iowa City, IA
- Game start: 11:05 am CDT
- Elapsed time: 3:09
- Game attendance: 69,250
- Game weather: 65 °F (18 °C), Sunny, Wind NE 6 mph (9.7 km/h)
- Referee: Mark Kluczynski
- TV announcers (FOX): Gus Johnson (play-by-play), Joel Klatt (analyst), and Jenny Taft (sideline)
- Source: Box Score

Scoring summary
1	9:53	Mich	Ronnie Bell 16-yard run (Jake Moody kick)	Michigan 7–0
2	8:28	Mich	Jake Moody 44-yard field goal	Michigan 10–0
2	0:09	Mich	Jake Moody 35-yard field goal	Michigan 13–0
3	7:51	Mich	Donovan Edwards 12-yard pass from J. J. McCarthy (Jake Moody kick)	Michigan 20–0
4	14:56	Iowa	Kaleb Johnson 2-yard run (Drew Stevens kick)	Michigan 20–7
4	1:19	Mich	Blake Corum 20-yard run (Jake Moody kick)	Michigan 27–7
4	0:08	Iowa	Luke Lachey 5-yard pass from Spencer Petras (Drew Stevens kick)	Michigan 27–14

Fox's Big Noon Kickoff was on hand for this contest. Michigan won at Kinnick Stadium for the first time since 2005.

Statistics	MICH	IOWA
First downs	24	16
Total yards	327	281
Rushing yards	172	35
Passing yards	155	246
Turnovers	0	0
Time of possession	33:44	26:16

Team	Category	Player	Statistics
Michigan	Passing	J. J. McCarthy	18/24, 155 yards, TD
Michigan	Rushing	Blake Corum	29 carries, 133 yards, TD
Michigan	Receiving	Luke Schoonmaker	4 receptions, 45 yards
Iowa	Passing	Spencer Petras	21/31, 246 yards, TD
Iowa	Rushing	Leshon Williams	8 carries, 34 yards
Iowa	Receiving	Luke Lachey	4 receptions, 84 yards, TD

=== At Illinois ===
Iowa at Illinois

Team	1	2	3	4	Total
Hawkeyes	3	3	0	0	6
• Fighting Illini	3	3	0	3	9

- Date: October 8
- Location:
  Memorial Stadium
  Champaign, IL
- Game start: 6:40 pm CDT
- Game attendance: 44,910
- Game weather: 56 °F (13 °C), Sunny, Wind SW 8 mph (13 km/h)
- Referee: Greg Blum
- TV announcers (BTN): Cory Provus (play-by-play), Jake Butt (analyst), and Elise Menaker (sideline)
- Source: Box Score

Scoring summary
1	9:03	Illinois	F. Pinton 27-yard field goal	Illinois 3–0
1	3:51	Iowa	Drew Stevens 32-yard field goal	Tied 3–3
2	8:00	Illinois	F. Pinton 37-yard field goal	Illinois 6–3
2	2:48	Iowa	Drew Stevens 27-yard field goal	Tied 6–6
4	2:49	Illinois	F. Pinton 36-yard field goal	Illinois 9–6

Illinois won for the first time in nine tries in the series. It was also former Iowa player and coach Bret Bielema's first game at Illinois against Iowa, as he missed the 2021 meeting due to issues relating to COVID-19.

Statistics	IOWA	ILL
First downs	13	18
Total yards	221	316
Rushing yards	52	200
Passing yards	169	116
Turnovers	1	3
Time of possession	28:55	31:05

Team	Category	Player	Statistics
Iowa	Passing	Spencer Petras	18–36, 169 yards, INT
Iowa	Rushing	Leshon Williams	7 carries, 32 yards
Iowa	Receiving	Sam LaPorta	9 receptions, 100 yards
Illinois	Passing	Artur Sitkowski	13–19, 74 yards, INT
Illinois	Rushing	Chase Brown	31 carries, 146 yards
Illinois	Receiving	Brian Hightower	5 receptions, 68 yards

=== At No. 2 Ohio State ===
Iowa at No. 2 Ohio State

Team	1	2	3	4	Total
Hawkeyes	7	3	0	0	10
• No. 2 Buckeyes	16	10	14	14	54

- Date: October 22
- Location: Ohio Stadium
  Columbus, OH
- Game start: 11:06 a.m. CDT
- Elapsed time: 3:20
- Game attendance: 104,848
- Game weather: 63 °F (17 °C), Mostly Sunny, Wind N 6 mph (9.7 km/h)
- Referee: Jerry McGinn
- TV announcers (FOX): Gus Johnson (play-by-play), Joel Klatt (analyst), and Jenny Taft (sideline)

Scoring summary
1	14:02	OSU	Noah Ruggles 46-yard field goal	Ohio State 3–0
1	13:00	Iowa	Joe Evans 11-yard fumble return (Drew Stevens kick)	Iowa 7–3
1	8:15	OSU	Miyan Williams 2-yard run (Noah Ruggles kick)	Ohio State 10–7
1	4:30	OSU	Noah Ruggles 41-yard field goal	Ohio State 13–7
1	0:00	OSU	Noah Ruggles 35-yard field goal	Ohio State 16–7
2	10:07	Iowa	Drew Stevens 49-yard field goal	Ohio State 16–10
2	3:38	OSU	Noah Ruggles 26-yard field goal	Ohio State 19–10
2	3:25	OSU	Tommy Eichenberg 15-yard interception return (Noah Ruggles kick)	Ohio State 26–10
3	9:36	OSU	Marvin Harrison Jr. 6-yard pass from C. J. Stroud (Noah Ruggles kick)	Ohio State 33–10
3	4:43	OSU	Emeka Egbuka 13-yard pass from C. J. Stroud (Noah Ruggles kick)	Ohio State 40–10
4	13:26	OSU	Julian Fleming 2-yard 79-yard pass from C. J. Stroud (Noah Ruggles kick)	Ohio State 47–10
4	7:59	OSU	Mitch Rossi 3-yard pass from C. J. Stroud (Noah Ruggles kick)	Ohio State 54–10

FOX's Big Noon Kickoff was on hand for this matchup in Columbus. The score was competitive for most of the first half, but a pick six by Ohio State gave the Buckeyes a cushion heading into the break. After settling for three first half field goals, the Ohio State offense put up four second half touchdowns – TD passes from C. J. Stroud to four different receivers – to make this game a blowout. The Iowa offense turned the ball over six times and mustered just 158 yards and a field goal in what was the team's worst defeat since Kirk Ferentz's Big Ten debut in 1999.

Statistics	Iowa	No. 2 Ohio State
First downs	8	16
Total yards	158	360
Rushing yards	77	66
Passing yards	81	294
Turnovers	6	2
Time of possession	29:14	30:46

Team	Category	Player	Statistics
Iowa	Passing	Spencer Petras	6–14, 49 yards, 0 TD, 2 INT
Iowa	Rushing	Leshon Williams	9 carries, 31 yards, 0 TD
Iowa	Receiving	Sam LaPorta	6 receptions, 55 yards, 0 TD
No. 2 Ohio State	Passing	C. J. Stroud	20–30, 286 yards, 4 TD, 1 INT
No. 2 Ohio State	Rushing	TreVeyon Henderson	11 carries, 38 yards, 0 TD
No. 2 Ohio State	Receiving	Julian Fleming	2 receptions, 105 yards, 1 TD

=== Northwestern ===
Northwestern at Iowa
Homecoming

Team	1	2	3	4	Total
Wildcats	0	0	7	6	13
• Hawkeyes	10	10	3	10	33

- Date: October 29
- Location:
  Kinnick Stadium
  Iowa City, IA
- Game start: 2:35 pm CDT
- Elapsed time: 3:00
- Game attendance: 69,250
- Game weather: 66 °F (19 °C), Sunny, Wind NW 3 mph (4.8 km/h)
- Referee: Mark Kluczynski
- TV announcers (ESPN2): Anish Shroff (play-by-play), Brock Osweiler (analyst), and Taylor McGregor (sideline)
- Source: Box Score

Scoring summary
1	10:01	Iowa	Drew Stevens 29-yard field goal	Iowa 3–0
1	0:31	Iowa	Spencer Petras 1-yard run (Drew Stevens kick)	Iowa 10–0
2	2:45	Iowa	Drew Stevens 24-yard field goal	Iowa 13–0
2	0:22	Iowa	Luke Lachey 6-yard pass from Spencer Petras (Drew Stevens kick)	Iowa 20–0
3	6:17	NW	D. Olges 1-yard pass from B. Sullivan (A. Stage kick)	Iowa 20–7
3	1:20	Iowa	Drew Stevens 54-yard field goal	Iowa 23–7
4	10:11	Iowa	Drew Stevens 25-yard field goal	Iowa 26–7
4	5:13	Iowa	Arland Bruce IV 23-yard run (Drew Stevens kick)	Iowa 33–7
4	0:00	NW	R. Niro III 7-yard pass from B. Sullivan	Iowa 33–13

Northwestern had won three in a row at Kinnick Stadium, but the Hawkeyes responded with a 20-point win after a criticism-filled week leading up to the game. Freshman kicker Drew Stevens had a banner day by kicking four field goals, including a 54-yarder – the 5th-longest (by distance) in school history. These are the first back-to-back wins against the Wildcats since the 2014-2015 seasons.

Statistics	NU	IOWA
First downs	16	24
Total yards	177	393
Rushing yards	18	173
Passing yards	159	220
Turnovers	1	0
Time of possession	28:16	31:44

Team	Category	Player	Statistics
Northwestern	Passing	Brendan Sullivan	23–30, 159 yards, 2 TD, INT
Northwestern	Rushing	Evan Hull	11 carries, 32 yards
Northwestern	Receiving	Bryce Kirtz	5 receptions, 35 yards
Iowa	Passing	Spencer Petras	21–30, 220 yards, TD
Iowa	Rushing	Kaleb Johnson	13 carries, 93 yards
Iowa	Receiving	Nico Ragaini	4 receptions, 66 yards

=== At Purdue ===
Iowa at Purdue

Team	1	2	3	4	Total
• Hawkeyes	0	17	7	0	24
Boilermakers	0	3	0	0	3

- Date: November 5
- Location:
  Ross–Ade Stadium
  West Lafayette, IN
- Game start: 12:04 p.m. EDT
- Elapsed time: 3:12
- Game attendance: 61,320
- Game weather: 63 °F (17 °C), Cloudy, Wind S 21 mph (34 km/h)
- Referee: Reggie Smith
- TV announcers (FS1): Eric Collins (play-by-play) and Devin Gardner (analyst)
- Source: Box Score

Scoring summary
2	14:23	Iowa	Sam LaPorta 16-yard pass from Spencer Petras (Drew Stevens kick)	Iowa 7–0
2	12:53	Iowa	Nico Ragaini 29-yard pass from Spencer Petras (Drew Stevens kick)	Iowa 14–0
2	6:11	Iowa	Drew Stevens 26-yard field goal	Iowa 17–0
2	1:40	Purdue	Mitchell Fineran 34-yard field goal	Iowa 17–3
3	14:43	Iowa	Kaleb Johnson 75-yard run (Drew Stevens kick)	Iowa 24–3

Purdue had won four of the previous five in this series, but the Hawkeye defense held the Boilermaker offense 190 yards and 30 points below their averages. Entering the game, Purdue hadn't scored fewer than 20 points in a game this season, and it was the first time Purdue didn't score an offensive touchdown at home since 2013. Freshman running back Kaleb Johnson had 22 carries for 200 yards that included a 75-yard TD run, earning him B1G Offensive Player of the Week and B1G Freshman of the Week honors.

Statistics	IOWA	PUR
First downs	15	17
Total yards	376	255
Rushing yards	184	87
Passing yards	192	168
Turnovers	0	2
Time of possession	28:02	31:58

Team	Category	Player	Statistics
Iowa	Passing	Spencer Petras	13–23, 192 yards, 2 TD
Iowa	Rushing	Kaleb Johnson	22 carries, 200 yards, TD
Iowa	Receiving	Sam LaPorta	3 receptions, 71 yards, TD
Purdue	Passing	Aidan O'Connell	20–43, 168 yards, 2 INT
Purdue	Rushing	Devin Mockobee	14 carries, 65 yards
Purdue	Receiving	Charlie Jones	11 receptions, 104 yards

=== Wisconsin ===
Wisconsin at Iowa
Heartland Trophy

Team	1	2	3	4	Total
Badgers	3	7	0	0	10
• Hawkeyes	0	14	0	10	24

- Date: November 12
- Location:
  Kinnick Stadium
  Iowa City, IA
- Game start: 2:40 p.m. CST
- Elapsed time: 3:19
- Game attendance: 69,250
- Game weather: 33 °F (1 °C), Cloudy, Wind SE 14 mph (23 km/h)
- Referee: Michael Cannon
- TV announcers (FS1): Dan Hellie (play-by-play) and Petros Papadakis (analyst)
- Source: Box Score

Scoring summary
1	4:14	Wisc	Nate Van Zelst 32-yard field goal	Wisconsin 3–0
2	10:24	Iowa	Kaleb Johnson 4-yard run (Drew Stevens kick)	Iowa 7–3
2	1:58	Iowa	Cooper DeJean 32-yard interception return (Drew Stevens kick)	Iowa 14–3
2	0:52	Wisc	Keontez Lewis 51-yard pass from Graham Mertz	Iowa 14–10
4	13:52	Iowa	Spencer Petras 1-yard run (Drew Stevens kick)	Iowa 21–10
4	2:54	Iowa	Drew Stevens 44-yard field goal	Iowa 24–10

Iowa recaptured the Heartland Trophy in a game where Wisconsin rarely threatened.

Statistics	WISC	IOWA
First downs	11	11
Total yards	227	146
Rushing yards	51	52
Passing yards	176	94
Turnovers	3	1
Time of possession	26:23	33:37

Team	Category	Player	Statistics
Wisconsin	Passing	Graham Mertz	16–35, 176 yards, TD, 2 INT
Wisconsin	Rushing	Braelon Allen	17 carries, 40 yards
Wisconsin	Receiving	Keontez Lewis	3 receptions, 71 yards, TD
Iowa	Passing	Spencer Petras	14–23, 93 yards
Iowa	Rushing	Kaleb Johnson	22 carries, 57 yards, TD
Iowa	Receiving	Sam LaPorta	5 receptions, 48 yards

=== At Minnesota ===
Iowa at Minnesota
Floyd of Rosedale

Team	1	2	3	4	Total
• Hawkeyes	10	0	0	3	13
Golden Gophers	0	7	3	0	10

- Date: November 19
- Location:
  Huntington Bank Stadium
  Minneapolis, MN
- Game start: 3:05 p.m. CST
- Elapsed time: 3:10
- Game attendance: 45,816
- Game weather: 17 °F (−8 °C), Sunny, Wind NW 20 mph (32 km/h)
- Referee: Jeffrey Servinski
- TV announcers (FOX): Tim Brando (play-by-play) and Spencer Tillman (analyst)
- Source: Box Score

Scoring summary
1	9:01	Iowa	Drew Stevens 38-yard field goal	Iowa 3–0
1	10:24	Iowa	Spencer Petras 1-yard run (Drew Stevens kick)	Iowa 10–0
2	10:24	Minn	Mohamed Ibrahim 5-yard run (Matthew Trickett kick)	Iowa 10–7
3	8:20	Minn	Matthew Trickett 27-yard field goal	Tied 10–10
4	0:28	Iowa	Drew Stevens 21-yard field goal	Iowa 13–10

Iowa won for the eighth consecutive time against the Gophers, building on its longest streak in the rivalry. After jumping out to a 10–0 first quarter lead, Iowa gave up over 300 yards rushing but forced two huge 4th quarter turnovers. Senior Jack Campbell had 10 tackles, a forced fumble, and an interception to earn B1G Defensive Player of the Week honors. Freshman Drew Stevens kicked his second field goal of the game to seal the win.

Statistics	IOWA	MINN
First downs	13	17
Total yards	280	399
Rushing yards	59	312
Passing yards	221	87
Turnovers	0	2
Time of possession	24:47	35:13

Team	Category	Player	Statistics
Iowa	Passing	Spencer Petras	15–24, 221 yards
Iowa	Rushing	Kaleb Johnson	8 carries, 43 yards
Iowa	Receiving	Sam LaPorta	4 receptions, 95 yards
Minnesota	Passing	Athan Kaliakmanis	7–15, 87 yards, INT
Minnesota	Rushing	Mohamed Ibrahim	39 carries, 263 yards, TD
Minnesota	Receiving	Daniel Jackson	2 receptions, 43 yards

=== Nebraska ===
Nebraska at Iowa
Heroes Trophy

Team	1	2	3	4	Total
• Cornhuskers	10	7	7	0	24
Hawkeyes	0	0	7	10	17

- Date: November 25
- Location:
  Kinnick Stadium
  Iowa City, IA
- Game start: 3:01 p.m. CST
- Elapsed time: 3:21
- Game attendance: 69,250
- Game weather: 53 °F (12 °C), Sunny, Wind E 16 mph (26 km/h)
- Referee: Ron Snodgrass
- TV announcers (BTN): Brandon Gaudin (play-by-play), Jake Butt (analyst), and Rick Pizzo (sideline)
- Source: Box Score

Scoring summary
1	8:45	Neb	Trey Palmer 87-yard pass from Casey Thompson (Tyler Bleekrode kick)	Nebraska 7–0
1	3:24	Neb	Tyler Bleekrode 21-yard field goal	Nebraska 10–0
2	10:51	Neb	Trey Palmer 18-yard pass from Casey Thompson (Tyler Bleekrode kick)	Nebraska 17–0
3	12:15	Neb	Trey Palmer 14-yard pass from Casey Thompson (Tyler Bleekrode kick)	Nebraska 24–0
3	8:32	Iowa	Kaleb Johnson 44-yard run (Drew Stevens kick)	Nebraska 24–7
4	6:49	Iowa	Luke Lachey 14-yard pass from Alex Padilla (Drew Stevens kick)	Nebraska 24–14
4	5:41	Iowa	Drew Stevens 45-yard field goal	Nebraska 24–17

The Cornhuskers defeated Iowa for the first time in eight tries, in what was Kirk Ferentz's 300th game as head coach of the Hawkeyes. This prevented Iowa from winning the Big Ten West Division and thus a berth in the 2022 Big Ten Championship Game.

Statistics	NEB	IOWA
First downs	17	18
Total yards	329	274
Rushing yards	51	124
Passing yards	278	150
Turnovers	1	4
Time of possession	31:15	28:45

Team	Category	Player	Statistics
Nebraska	Passing	Casey Thompson	20–30, 278 yards, 3 TD
Nebraska	Rushing	Rahmir Johnson	12 carries, 52 yards
Nebraska	Receiving	Trey Palmer	9 receptions, 165 yards, 2 TD
Iowa	Passing	Alex Padilla	16–33, 141 yards, TD, INT
Iowa	Rushing	Kaleb Johnson	16 carries, 109 yards, TD
Iowa	Receiving	Luke Lachey	7 receptions, 89 yards, TD

=== Vs. Kentucky (Music City Bowl) ===
Iowa vs. Kentucky
Music City Bowl

Team	1	2	3	4	Total
• Hawkeyes	0	21	0	0	21
Wildcats	0	0	0	0	0

- Date: December 31
- Location:
  Nissan Stadium
  Nashville, TN
- Game start: 11:00 a.m. CST
- Game attendance: 42,312
- Game weather: 59 °F (15 °C), Cloudy, Wind SW 7 mph (11 km/h)
- Referee: Mark Duddy (Pac-12)
- TV announcers (ABC/Bowl Season Radio): Matt Barrie (play-by-play), Louis Riddick (analyst), and Harry Lyles Jr. (sideline)/Joe Fisher (play-by-play), Hans Olsen (analyst), and Amie Wells (sideline)
- Source: Box Score

Scoring summary
2	12:08	Iowa	Luke Lachey 15-yard pass from Joey Labas (Drew Stevens kick)	Iowa 7–0
2	11:57	Iowa	Xavier Nwankpa 52-yard interception return (Drew Stevens kick)	Iowa 14–0
2	1:36	Iowa	Cooper DeJean 14-yard interception return (Drew Stevens kick)	Iowa 21–0

All the scoring came in the second quarter as Luke Lachey caught a 15-yard pass from Joey Labas and the secondary delivered two pick sixes – first from Xavier Nwankpa for 52 yards followed by Cooper DeJean for 14 yards. Kirk Ferentz earned his 10th bowl victory in this rematch of a bowl game from the year prior.

Statistics	IOWA	UK
First downs	10	10
Total yards	206	185
Rushing yards	67	68
Passing yards	139	117
Turnovers	0	2
Time of possession	25:43	34:17

Team	Category	Player	Statistics
Iowa	Passing	Joey Labas	14–24, 139 yards, TD
Iowa	Rushing	Jaziun Patterson	4 carries, 23 yards
Iowa	Receiving	Sam LaPorta	5 receptions, 56 yards
Kentucky	Passing	Destin Wade	16–30, 98 yards, 2 INT
Kentucky	Rushing	JuTahn McClain	10 carries, 40 yards
Kentucky	Receiving	Dane Key	6 receptions, 47 yards

== Awards and honors ==
Individual Awards
Player	Award	Ref.
Jack Campbell	Butkus Award; William V. Campbell Trophy; Nagurski–Woodson Defensive Player of the Year; Butkus–Fitzgerald Linebacker of the Year	
Sam LaPorta	Kwalick–Clark Tight End of the Year	

== Players drafted into the NFL ==
Round	Pick	Player	Position	NFL Club
1	13	Lukas Van Ness	DE	Green Bay Packers
1	18	Jack Campbell	LB	Detroit Lions
2	34	Sam LaPorta	TE	Detroit Lions
3	83	Riley Moss	CB	Denver Broncos
