= 2022 Kentucky Wildcats football team =

American college football season

2022 Kentucky Wildcats football

Music City Bowl, L 0–21 vs. Iowa
- Conference: Southeastern Conference
- Eastern Division
- Record: 7–6 (3–5 SEC)
- Head coach: Mark Stoops (10th season)
- Offensive coordinator: Rich Scangarello (1st season)
- Offensive scheme: Pro-style
- Defensive coordinator: Brad White (4th season)
- Base defense: 3–4 or 4–3
- Home stadium: Kroger Field

2022 Southeastern Conference football standings
	Conf.			Overall
Team	W		L	W		L
Eastern Division
No. 1 Georgia xy$#^	8	–	0	15	–	0
No. 6 Tennessee	6	–	2	11	–	2
No. 23 South Carolina	4	–	4	8	–	5
Kentucky	3	–	5	7	–	6
Florida	3	–	5	6	–	7
Missouri	3	–	5	6	–	7
Vanderbilt	2	–	6	5	–	7
Western Division
No. 16 LSU xy	6	–	2	10	–	4
No. 5 Alabama x	6	–	2	11	–	2
No. 20 Mississippi State	4	–	4	9	–	4
Ole Miss	4	–	4	8	–	5
Arkansas	3	–	5	7	–	6
Auburn	2	–	6	5	–	7
Texas A&M	2	–	6	5	–	7
Championship: Georgia 50, LSU 30
# – College Football Playoff champion; ^ – College Football Playoff participant; $ – Conference champion; x – Division champion/co-champions; y – Championship game participant; Rankings from AP Poll

The 2022 Kentucky Wildcats football team represented the University of Kentucky in the 2022 NCAA Division I FBS football season. The Wildcats played their home games at Kroger Field in Lexington, Kentucky, and competed in the Eastern Division of the Southeastern Conference (SEC). They were led by tenth-year head coach Mark Stoops.

On August 2, 2024, the NCAA announced that the University of Kentucky has agreed to accept penalties for violations of impermissible benefits as 11 football players were paid for jobs which they did not perform in the 2021 and 2022 seasons. Although the NCAA has not announced the full penalties, it has been indicated by the university that those penalties will include a 2–year probation and vacation of all games in which the ineligible players participated for those two seasons.

== Schedule ==
Kentucky and the SEC announced the 2022 football schedule on September 21, 2021.

Date	Time	Opponent	Rank	Site	TV	Result	Attendance
September 3	7:00 p.m.	Miami (OH)*	No. 20	Kroger Field; Lexington, KY	SECN+/ESPN+	W 37–13	61,139
September 10	7:00 p.m.	at No. 12 Florida	No. 20	Ben Hill Griffin Stadium; Gainesville, FL (rivalry)	ESPN	W 26–16	89,993
September 17	12:00 p.m.	Youngstown State*	No. 9	Kroger Field; Lexington, KY	SECN	W 31–0	59,308
September 24	7:00 p.m.	Northern Illinois*	No. 8	Kroger Field; Lexington, KY	ESPN2	W 31–23	61,579
October 1	12:00 p.m.	at No. 14 Ole Miss	No. 7	Vaught–Hemingway Stadium; Oxford, MS (SEC Nation)	ESPN	L 19–22	64,828
October 8	7:30 p.m.	South Carolina	No. 13	Kroger Field; Lexington, KY	SECN	L 14–24	61,612
October 15	7:30 p.m.	No. 16 Mississippi State	No. 22	Kroger Field; Lexington, KY	SECN	W 27–17	61,451
October 29	7:00 p.m.	at No. 3 Tennessee	No. 19	Neyland Stadium; Knoxville, TN (rivalry)	ESPN	L 6–44	101,915
November 5	12:00 p.m.	at Missouri		Faurot Field; Columbia, MO	SECN	W 21–17	61,047
November 12	12:00 p.m.	Vanderbilt	No. 24	Kroger Field; Lexington, KY (rivalry)	SECN	L 21–24	57,474
November 19	3:30 p.m.	No. 1 Georgia		Kroger Field; Lexington, KY	CBS	L 6–16	61,022
November 26	3:00 p.m.	No. 25 Louisville*		Kroger Field; Lexington, KY (Governor's Cup)	SECN	W 26–13	58,727
December 31	12:00 p.m.	vs. Iowa*		Nissan Stadium; Nashville, TN (Music City Bowl)	ABC	L 0–21	42,312
*Non-conference game; Rankings from AP Poll (and CFP Rankings, after November 1) - Released prior to game; All times are in Eastern time

== Coaching staff ==
Name	Position	Years at Kentucky
Mark Stoops	Head coach	10th
Vince Marrow	Associate head coach/tight ends coach	10th
Rich Scangarello	Offensive coordinator/quarterbacks coach	1st
Brad White	Defensive coordinator/outside linebackers coach	5th
John Settle	Running backs coach	2nd
Mike Stoops	Inside linebackers coach	1st
Frank Buffano	Safeties coach	3rd
Chris Collins	Defensive backs coach	2nd
Zach Yenser	Offensive line coach	1st
Scott Woodward	Wide receivers coach	2nd
Anwar Stewart	Defensive line coach	3rd
Mark Hill	Strength and conditioning	7th

== Game summaries ==
=== Miami (OH) ===
Uniform Combination
Helmet	Jersey	Pants

Team	1	2	3	4	Total
Miami (OH)	7	3	3	0	13
• No. 20 Kentucky	7	6	17	7	37

- Date: September 3
- Location: Lexington, KY
- Game start: 7:02 p.m.
- Game attendance: 61,139
- Game weather: 76°F, Cloudy, Wind E @ 7 mph
- Referee: Ken Williamson
- TV announcers (ESPN+/SECN+): Mike Morgan (play-by-play), Tom Ramsey (color), Coley Harvey (sideline)

Statistics	Miami (OH)	Kentucky
First downs	17	20
Total yards	290	353
Rushing yards	111	50
Passing yards	179	303
Turnovers	1	1
Time of possession	31:53	28:07

Team	Category	Player	Statistics
Miami (OH)	Passing	Brett Gabbert	20/28, 166 yards
Miami (OH)	Rushing	Tyre Shelton	7 carries, 50 yards, 1 TD
Miami (OH)	Receiving	Mac Hippenhammer	7 receptions, 85 yards
Kentucky	Passing	Will Levis	21/32, 303 yards, 3 TDs, 1 INT
Kentucky	Rushing	Kavosiey Smoke	7 carries, 32 yards
Kentucky	Receiving	Tayvion Robinson	6 receptions, 136 yards

=== At No. 12 Florida ===
Uniform Combination
Helmet	Jersey	Pants

Team	1	2	3	4	Total
• No. 20 Kentucky	0	13	10	3	26
No. 12 Florida	3	13	0	0	16

- Date: September 10
- Location: Gainesville, FL
- Game start: 7:05 p.m.
- Game attendance: 89,993
- Game weather: Cloudy
- Referee: Matt Loeffler
- TV announcers (ESPN): Joe Tessitore (play-by-play), Greg McElroy (color), Katie George and Todd McShay (sideline)

Statistics	Kentucky	Florida
First downs	17	12
Total yards	272	279
Rushing yards	70	136
Passing yards	202	143
Turnovers	1	2
Time of possession	33:24	26:36

Team	Category	Player	Statistics
Kentucky	Passing	Will Levis	13/24, 202 yards, 1 TD, 1 INT
Kentucky	Rushing	Kavosiey Smoke	14 carries, 80 yards
Kentucky	Receiving	Dane Key	3 receptions, 83 yards, 1 TD
Florida	Passing	Anthony Richardson	14/35, 143 yards, 2 INTs
Florida	Rushing	Montrell Johnson Jr.	7 carries, 62 yards
Florida	Receiving	Xzavier Henderson	6 receptions, 50 yards

=== Youngstown State ===
Uniform Combination
Helmet	Jersey	Pants

Team	1	2	3	4	Total
Youngstown St	0	0	0	0	0
• No. 9 Kentucky	0	21	7	3	31

- Date: September 17
- Location: Lexington, KY
- Game start: 12:03 p.m.
- Game attendance: 59,308
- Game weather: 80°F, Sunny, Wind SE @ 6 mph
- Referee: Scott Walker
- TV announcers (SEC Network): Dave Neal (play-by-play), Deuce McAllister (color), Andraya Carter (sideline)

Statistics	Youngstown St	Kentucky
First downs	9	26
Total yards	192	480
Rushing yards	58	103
Passing yards	134	377
Turnovers	1	3
Time of possession	21:50	38:10

Team	Category	Player	Statistics
Youngstown St	Passing	Demeatric Crenshaw	7/21, 120 yards, 1 INT
Youngstown St	Rushing	Jaleel McLaughlin	10 carries, 36 yards
Youngstown St	Receiving	Jaleel McLaughlin	3 receptions, 60 yards
Kentucky	Passing	Will Levis	27/35, 377 yards, 2 TDs, 2 INTs
Kentucky	Rushing	Kavosiey Smoke	18 carries, 66 yards, 1 TD
Kentucky	Receiving	Dane Key	6 receptions, 90 yards, 1 TD

=== Northern Illinois ===
Team	1	2	3	4	Total
NIU	7	7	0	9	23
• No. 8 Kentucky	7	7	10	7	31

- Date: September 24
- Location: Lexington, KY
- Game start: 7:05 p.m.
- Game attendance: 61,579
- Game weather: 71°F, Sunny, Wind SW @ 6 mph
- Referee: Steve Marlowe
- TV announcers (ESPN2): Anish Shroff (play-by-play), Brock Osweiler (color), Alex Chappell (sideline)

Statistics	NIU	Kentucky
First downs	14	18
Total yards	327	406
Rushing yards	128	103
Passing yards	199	303
Turnovers	0	1
Time of possession	26:17	33:43

Team	Category	Player	Statistics
NIU	Passing	Ethan Hampton	13/25, 196 yards, 1 TD
NIU	Rushing	Harrison Waylee	18 carries, 63 yards
NIU	Receiving	Kacper Rutkiewicz	1 reception, 63 yards
Kentucky	Passing	Will Levis	18/26, 303 yards, 4 TDs
Kentucky	Rushing	Kavosiey Smoke	12 carries, 85 yards
Kentucky	Receiving	Tayvion Robinson	7 receptions, 147 yards, 2 TDs

=== At No. 14 Ole Miss ===
Team	1	2	3	4	Total
No. 7 Kentucky	6	6	7	0	19
• No. 14 Ole Miss	14	5	3	0	22

- Date: October 1
- Location: Oxford, MS
- Game start: 11:07 a.m.
- Game attendance: 64,828
- Game weather: 72°F, Sunny, Wind NE @ 10 mph
- Referee: David Smith
- TV announcers (ESPN): Sean McDonough (play-by-play), Todd Blackledge (color), Molly McGrath and Todd McShay (sideline)

Statistics	Kentucky	Ole Miss
First downs	17	19
Total yards	328	399
Rushing yards	108	186
Passing yards	220	213
Turnovers	2	1
Time of possession	36:53	23:07

Team	Category	Player	Statistics
Kentucky	Passing	Will Levis	18/24, 220 yards, 2 TDs
Kentucky	Rushing	Chris Rodriguez Jr.	19 carries, 72 yards, 1 TD
Kentucky	Receiving	Barion Brown	2 receptions, 81 yards
Ole Miss	Passing	Jaxson Dart	15/29, 213 yards, 1 INT
Ole Miss	Rushing	Quinshon Judkins	14 carries, 106 yards, 1 TD
Ole Miss	Receiving	Malik Heath	6 receptions, 100 yards

=== South Carolina ===
Team	1	2	3	4	Total
• South Carolina	7	0	10	7	24
No. 13 Kentucky	0	7	0	7	14

- Date: October 8
- Location: Lexington, KY
- Game start: 7:39 p.m.
- Game attendance: 61,612
- Game weather: 50°F, Clear, Wind N @ 4 mph
- Referee: Scott Walker
- TV announcers (SECN): Tom Hart (play-by-play), Jordan Rodgers (color), Cole Cubelic (sideline)

Statistics	South Carolina	Kentucky
First downs	15	18
Total yards	356	299
Rushing yards	179	121
Passing yards	177	178
Turnovers	2	2
Time of possession	28:55	31:05

Team	Category	Player	Statistics
South Carolina	Passing	Spencer Rattler	14/19, 177 yards, 1 TD, 1 INT
South Carolina	Rushing	MarShawn Lloyd	22 carries, 110 yards, 1 TD
South Carolina	Receiving	Antwane Wells Jr.	3 receptions, 66 yards, 1 TD
Kentucky	Passing	Kaiya Sheron	15/27, 178 yards, 2 TDs, 1 INT
Kentucky	Rushing	Chris Rodriguez Jr.	22 carries, 126 yards
Kentucky	Receiving	Chauncey Magwood	2 receptions, 37 yards

=== No. 16 Mississippi State ===
Team	1	2	3	4	Total
No. 16 Miss State	0	3	7	7	17
• No. 22т Kentucky	0	3	10	14	27

- Date: October 15
- Location: Lexington, KY
- Game start: 7:39 p.m.
- Game attendance: 61,451
- Game weather: 63°F, Clear, Wind W @ 5 mph
- Referee: Lee Hedrick
- TV announcers (SECN): Tom Hart (play-by-play), Jordan Rodgers (color), Cole Cubelic (sideline)

Statistics	Miss State	Kentucky
First downs	13	24
Total yards	225	478
Rushing yards	22	239
Passing yards	203	239
Turnovers	1	2
Time of possession	20:38	39:22

Team	Category	Player	Statistics
Miss State	Passing	Will Rogers	25/37, 203 yards, 1 TD, 1 INT
Miss State	Rushing	Dillon Johnson	2 carries, 16 yards
Miss State	Receiving	Jo'Quavious Marks	7 receptions, 60 yards
Kentucky	Passing	Will Levis	17/23, 230 yards, 1 TD, 1 INT
Kentucky	Rushing	Chris Rodriguez Jr.	30 carries, 196 yards, 2 TDs
Kentucky	Receiving	Barion Brown	7 receptions, 62 yards

=== At No. 3 Tennessee ===
Team	1	2	3	4	Total
No. 19 Kentucky	6	0	0	0	6
• No. 3 Tennessee	7	20	10	7	44

- Date: October 29
- Location: Knoxville, TN
- Game start: 7:11 p.m.
- Game attendance: 101,915
- Game weather: 64°F, Cloudy, Wind NE @ 2 mph
- Referee: Ken Williamson
- TV announcers (ESPN): Chris Fowler (play-by-play), Kirk Herbstreit (color), Holly Rowe (sideline)

Statistics	Kentucky	Tennessee
First downs	14	19
Total yards	205	422
Rushing yards	107	177
Passing yards	98	245
Turnovers	3	0
Time of possession	35:11	24:49

Team	Category	Player	Statistics
Kentucky	Passing	Will Levis	16/27, 98 yards, 3 INTs
Kentucky	Rushing	Chris Rodriguez Jr.	15 carries, 64 yards, 1 TD
Kentucky	Receiving	Jordan Dingle	4 receptions, 44 yards
Tennessee	Passing	Hendon Hooker	19/25, 245 yards, 3 TDs
Tennessee	Rushing	Jabari Small	21 carries, 78 yards
Tennessee	Receiving	Jalin Hyatt	5 receptions, 138 yards, 2 TDs

=== At Missouri ===
Team	1	2	3	4	Total
• Kentucky	7	0	7	7	21
Missouri	3	0	0	14	17

- Date: November 5
- Location: Columbia, MO
- Game start: 11:03 a.m.
- Game attendance: 61,047
- Game weather: 45°F, Cloudy, Wind NE @ 19 mph
- Referee: Steve Marlowe
- TV announcers (SEC Network): Jay Alter (play-by-play), Dustin Fox (color), Lauren Sisler (sideline)

Statistics	Kentucky	Missouri
First downs	15	12
Total yards	252	232
Rushing yards	82	89
Passing yards	170	143
Turnovers	0	2
Time of possession	31:05	28:55

Team	Category	Player	Statistics
Kentucky	Passing	Will Levis	13/19, 170 yards, 3 TDs
Kentucky	Rushing	Chris Rodriguez Jr.	29 carries, 112 yards
Kentucky	Receiving	Barion Brown	4 receptions, 54 yards
Missouri	Passing	Brady Cook	18/26, 143 yards
Missouri	Rushing	Cody Schrader	21 carries, 65 yards
Missouri	Receiving	Luther Burden III	6 receptions, 60 yards

=== Vanderbilt ===
Team	1	2	3	4	Total
• Vanderbilt	7	0	7	10	24
No. 24 Kentucky	6	0	3	12	21

- Date: November 12
- Location: Lexington, KY
- Game start: 12:03 p.m.
- Game attendance: 57,474
- Game weather: 34°F, Cloudy, Wind NW @ 8 mph
- Referee: Jason Autrey
- TV announcers (SEC Network): Dave Neal (play-by-play), Deuce McAlister (color), Morgan Uber (sideline)

Statistics	Vanderbilt	Kentucky
First downs	18	16
Total yards	448	322
Rushing yards	264	213
Passing yards	184	109
Turnovers	2	1
Time of possession	33:15	26:45

Team	Category	Player	Statistics
Vanderbilt	Passing	Mike Wright	12/23, 184 yards, 1 TD, 1 INT
Vanderbilt	Rushing	Ray Davis	26 carries, 129 yards, 1 TD
Vanderbilt	Receiving	Will Sheppard	5 receptions, 88 yards, 1 TD
Kentucky	Passing	Will Levis	11/23, 109 yards, 1 INT
Kentucky	Rushing	Chris Rodriguez Jr.	18 carries, 162 yards, 2 TDs
Kentucky	Receiving	Tayvion Robinson	5 receptions, 49 yards

=== No. 1 Georgia ===
Team	1	2	3	4	Total
• No. 1 Georgia	3	6	7	0	16
Kentucky	0	0	0	6	6

- Date: November 19
- Location: Lexington, KY
- Game start: 3:39 p.m.
- Game attendance: 61,022
- Game weather: 36°F, Sunny, Wind SW @ 13 mph
- Referee: James Carter
- TV announcers (CBS): Brad Nessler (play-by-play), Gary Danielson (color), Jenny Dell (sideline)

Statistics	Georgia	Kentucky
First downs	20	17
Total yards	363	295
Rushing yards	247	89
Passing yards	116	206
Turnovers	1	1
Time of possession	30:02	29:58

Team	Category	Player	Statistics
Georgia	Passing	Stetson Bennett	13/19, 116 yards, 1 INT
Georgia	Rushing	Kenny McIntosh	19 carries, 143 yards, 1 TD
Georgia	Receiving	Dominick Blaylock	2 receptions, 38 yards
Kentucky	Passing	Will Levis	20/31, 206 yards, 1 TD, 1 INT
Kentucky	Rushing	Chris Rodriguez Jr.	17 carries, 51 yards
Kentucky	Receiving	Barion Brown	10 receptions, 145 yards, 1 TD

=== No. 25 Louisville ===
Governor’s Cup

Team	1	2	3	4	Total
No. 25 Louisville	0	7	0	6	13
• Kentucky	7	6	10	3	26

- Date: November 26
- Location: Lexington, KY
- Game start: 3:01 p.m.
- Game attendance: 58,727
- Game weather: 56°F, Cloudy, Wind SE @ 6 mph
- Referee: Jeff Flanagan
- TV announcers (SEC Network): Dave Neal (play-by-play), Deuce McAllister (color), Andraya Carter (sideline)

Statistics	Louisville	Kentucky
First downs	19	17
Total yards	309	346
Rushing yards	164	158
Passing yards	145	188
Turnovers	3	0
Time of possession	27:15	32:45

Team	Category	Player	Statistics
Louisville	Passing	Brock Domann	14/21, 129 yards, 1 TD, 1 INT
Louisville	Rushing	Jawhar Jordan	22 carries, 145 yards
Louisville	Receiving	Tyler Hudson	6 receptions, 83 yards, 1 TD
Kentucky	Passing	Will Levis	11/19, 188 yards, 2 TDs
Kentucky	Rushing	Chris Rodriguez Jr.	24 carries, 120 yards
Kentucky	Receiving	Josh Kattus	2 receptions, 76 yards

=== Vs. Iowa ===
Music City Bowl

Team	1	2	3	4	Total
• Iowa	0	21	0	0	21
Kentucky	0	0	0	0	0

- Date: December 31
- Location: Nashville, TN
- Game start: 11:10 a.m.
- Game attendance: 42,312
- Game weather: 59°F, Cloudy, Wind SW @ 7 mph
- Referee: Mark Duddy
- TV announcers (ABC): Matt Barrie (play-by-play), Louis Riddick (color), Harry Lyles Jr. (sideline)

Scoring summary
2	12:08	Iowa	Luke Lachey 15-yard pass from Joey Labas (Drew Stevens kick)	Iowa 7–0
2	11:57	Iowa	Xavier Nwankpa 52-yard interception return (Drew Stevens kick)	Iowa 14–0
2	1:36	Iowa	Cooper DeJean 14-yard interception return (Drew Stevens kick)	Iowa 21–0

Statistics	Iowa	Kentucky
First downs	10	10
Total yards	206	185
Rushing yards	67	68
Passing yards	139	117
Turnovers	0	2
Time of possession	25:43	34:17

Team	Category	Player	Statistics
Iowa	Passing	Joe Labas	14/24, 139 yards, 1 TD
Iowa	Rushing	Jaziun Patterson	4 carries, 23 yards
Iowa	Receiving	Sam LaPorta	5 receptions, 56 yards
Kentucky	Passing	Destin Wade	16/30, 98 yards, 2 INTs
Kentucky	Rushing	JuTahn McClain	10 carries, 40 yards
Kentucky	Receiving	Dane Key	6 receptions, 47 yards

== Rankings ==
Ranking movements Legend: ██ Increase in ranking ██ Decrease in ranking — = Not ranked RV = Received votes т = Tied with team above or below
	Week															
Poll	Pre	1	2	3	4	5	6	7	8	9	10	11	12	13	14	Final
AP	20	20	9	8	7	13	22T	19	19	RV	RV	—	—	—	—	—
Coaches	21	20	10	9	8	13	22	18	17	24	24	RV	—	—	—	—
CFP	Not released									—	24	—	—	—	—	Not released
