= Alex Padilla (American football) =

American football player (born 1999)

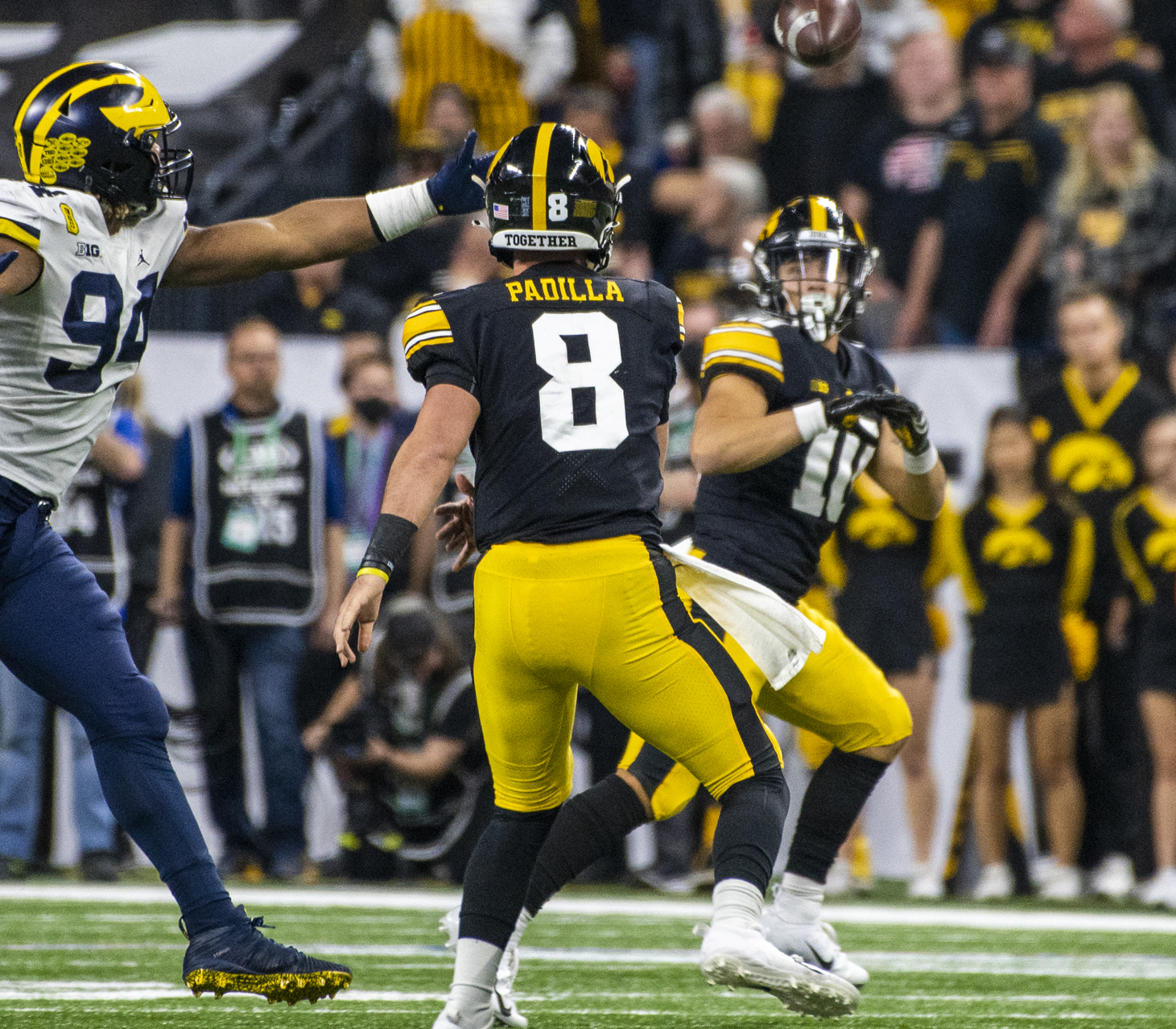

No. 8, 16
- Position: Quarterback

Personal information
- Born: March 15, 2001 (age 25); Greenwood Village, Colorado, U.S.
- Listed height: 6 ft 1 in (1.85 m)
- Listed weight: 200 lb (91 kg)

Career information
- High school: Cherry Creek (Greenwood Village)
- College: Iowa (2019−2022); SMU (2023)
- Stats at ESPN

Alex Padilla (born March 15, 2001) is an American former college football player who was a quarterback for the SMU Mustangs and Iowa Hawkeyes.

== Early life ==
Padilla was born on March 15, 2001, in Greenwood Village, Colorado. He played high school football at Cherry Creek High School. During his time at Cherry Creek he was a four-year letterman in football and baseball and led the football team to four straight playoff appearances, and finishing as state runner-ups as a senior in 2018. Padilla was 40–12 as a starter, he holds the school's record for touchdown passes in a season with 40 as a junior and holds the record for passing yards in a season with 2,678 also in his junior year. He was named first-team all-conference in his junior year as well as first-team all-state honors.

In Padilla's senior year he threw for 1,951 yards and 24 touchdowns, which was good enough to earn first-team all-state honors once again along with being a first-team all-conference player. That year he led the team to a 12–2 (4–1 in 5A Metro East) record only losing against Grandview High School 21–28 in overtime and in the championship game against Valor Christian High School 14–24. Padilla was a three star recruit and he committed to play for the Iowa Hawkeyes on June 14, 2018.

College recruiting
Name	Hometown	School	Height	Weight	Commit date
Alex Padilla; QB	Greenwood Village, Colorado	Cherry Creek High School	6 ft 1 in (1.85 m)	190 lb (86 kg)	Jun 14, 2018
Alex Padilla; QB	Recruit ratings: Scout: Rivals: 247Sports: ESPN:				
Overall recruit ranking: 247Sports: 1150
Note: In many cases, Scout, Rivals, 247Sports, On3, and ESPN may conflict in their listings of height and weight.; In these cases, the average was taken. ESPN grades are on a 100-point scale.; Sources: "2018 Team Ranking". Rivals.com.

== College career ==
=== Iowa ===
In 2019, Padilla was redshirted and did not see action in any games.

In 2020, he was the backup to Spencer Petras. He saw his first career action in a 49–7 win over Michigan State where he was threw two passes for one completion and twelve yards, along with two rushing attempts for seven yards. He only appeared in one other game against Minnesota in a 35–7 win but did not record any stats.

In 2021, Padilla was once again backing up Petras. He saw significant action against Northwestern after Petras got injured, completing eighteen of 28 pass attempts and had no touchdowns or interceptions in a 17–12 win. Padilla made his first career start against rival Minnesota where he went eleven of 24 for 206 yards and two touchdowns in a 27–22 win. He made his second consecutive start against Illinois going six for seventeen for 83 yards and an interception in a 33–23 victory to improve Iowa's record to 9–2. Padilla made his third and final start of the season against Nebraska, going six for fourteen for 76 yards in the first half before getting pulled in favor of Petras in a 28–21 win, the team's third in a row. He returned to his back-up role for the team's game against No. 2 Michigan, but did see action after an injury to Petras. Padilla went ten for fifteen for 38 yards and one interception in a 42–3 losing effort to the Wolverines. He did not see playing time in Iowa's 17–29 loss to Kentucky in the 2022 Citrus Bowl. He won the Next Man In Award and was named Academic All-Big Ten.

In 2022, he was named the back-up to Petras. Padilla saw his first action of the season after coming late against Ohio State where he went five for ten for 32 yards and one interception in a 10–54 loss. Ahead of Iowa's game against Northwestern, the team's depth chart showed either Padilla or Petras would start. Petras was decided as the starter prior to the game. On November 29, 2022, Padilla decided to enter the transfer portal.

=== SMU ===
On January 20, 2023, Padilla announced his intention to transfer to SMU.

=== Statistics ===
Season		Games			Passing								Rushing		
Season	Team	GP	Record	Comp	Att	Pct	Yards	Avg	TD	Int	Rate	Att	Yards	Avg	TD
2019	Iowa	DNP													
2020	Iowa	2	0−0	1	2	50.0	12	6.0	0	0	100.4	2	7	3.5	0
2021	Iowa	9	3−0	55	112	49.1	636	5.7	2	2	99.1	17	-25	-1.5	1
2022	Iowa	2	0−0	21	43	48.8	173	4.0	1	2	81.0	9	-35	-3.9	0
2023	SMU	3	—	5	7	71.4	59	8.4	0	0	142.2	0	0	0.0	0
Career			16	3−0	82	164	50.0	880	5.2	3	4	96.3	28	-53	-1.9

== Personal life ==
Padilla is the son of Alison and Mike Padilla.
