= Wildcat Marching Band =

Marching band of the University of Kentucky

The University of Kentucky Wildcat Marching Band
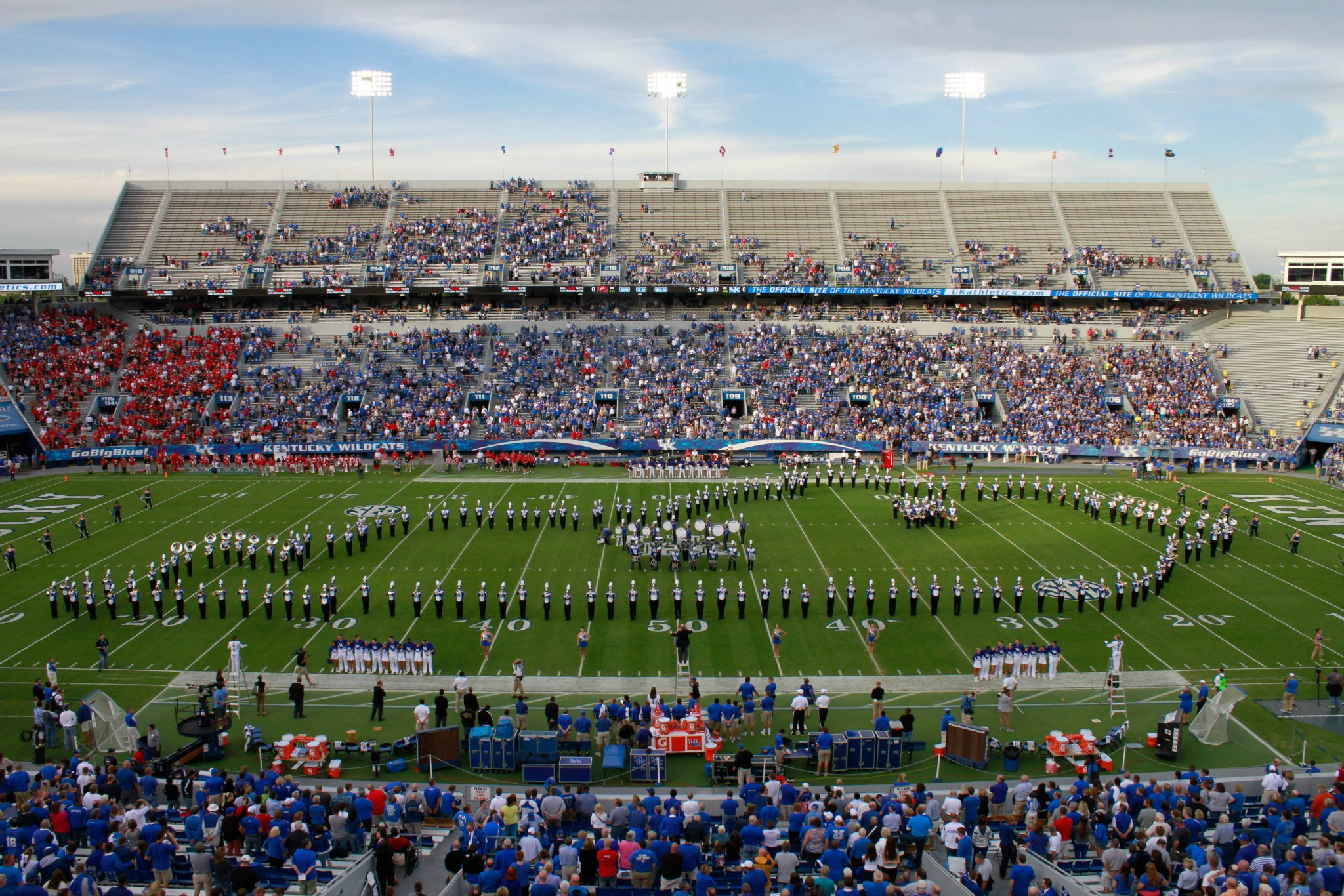
- School: University of Kentucky
- Location: Lexington, Kentucky
- Conference: SEC
- Founded: by 1893
- Director: Dr. Shayna Stahl
- Members: ~274
- Fight song: "On, On, U of K"

The Wildcat Marching Band (WMB) is the marching band of the University of Kentucky (UK), located in Lexington, Kentucky. The WMB performs at all UK home football games and selected away games. Any UK, Bluegrass Community and Technical College (BCTC), or Transylvania University student, regardless of major, is eligible for membership. The Wildcat Marching Band is directed by Dr. Shayna Stahl.

== Rehearsals ==
Band rehearsals are scheduled on Monday, Wednesday, and Friday from 5:30 pm to 7:30 pm at Shively Field. Rehearsals on home game days begin six hours before kickoff and last two hours. Game day rehearsals are held at Shively Field. No extra rehearsals are scheduled.

== Registration ==
Marching Band, MUC 190, earns one credit per fall semester, which may be used as an elective in any degree program. The Wildcat Marching Band also includes a few students each year from BCTC and Transylvania University whom do not field a marching band.

== Early week ==
"Early Week", as UK's band camp is called, is held one week before classes begin and includes extensive training in marching and playing. New members begin a day before the rest of the returning members. The camp runs 9:00am to 9:00pm, with breaks for meals. Time is divided between learning drill at Shively Practice Field and indoor music rehearsals. In the evenings, there are activities sponsored by Kappa Kappa Psi Theta Epsilon and Tau Beta Sigma Eta Zeta. Recent activities have included kickball, a volleyball tournament, Band Olympics, and an Annual Pie in the Face competition. The band provides three meals each day, and students living in residence halls are allowed to move in early.

== Travel ==
The band provides a pep band for every away game and travels with the full band to one away game. Expenses such as lodging, transportation, and meals are provided by the University of Kentucky. There is no cost to the band members.

== History ==
The first recorded marching band at UK was an unofficial "Cadet Band" led by Herman Trost, who had been a bandleader in Sherman's Army in the Civil War and a close friend of John Philip Sousa and was part of a group of immigrants from Germany and Prussia call the Forty-Eighters. Informally affiliated with military training, the band existed by 1893, and possibly as early as 1889.

In 1903, Captain George Byroade, Commandant of the Military Science department, appointed Professor Rucker as band director, creating the first official marching band at UK.

In the fall of 1920, Sgt. John J. Kennedy was hired as band director, and under his direction the band became known as "The Best Band in Dixie".

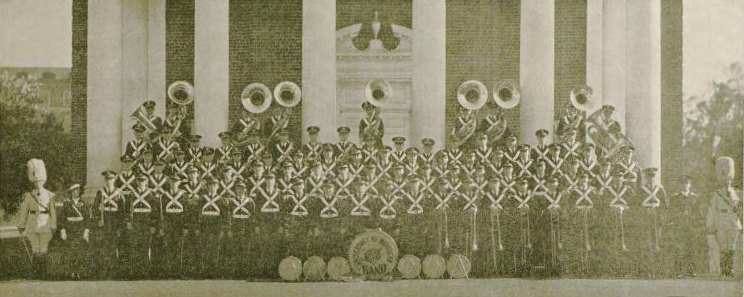
The band, c. 1934

In the late 1920s, Elmer "Bromo" Sulzer founded the all-female "Co-Ed band", for many years the only such band in the US.

W. Harry Clarke was director from 1968 to 1989. He introduced many new things to the band, including bringing women into the band. Just before Clarke took over, the Band had suffered from low membership and some bumpy times. Within a few years, the "Marching Hundred" turned into a 200-plus member Marching Band. The UK Band was honored during this time to perform at the 1969 Presidential Inauguration of Richard M. Nixon. Clarke also added an Associate Director of Bands in the late 1970s.

W. Dale Warren was the director from 1989 to 1991. Tom Brawner was director beginning in 1991. Richard Clary was the director from 1993 to 1995. George R. Boulden was the director from 1995 to 2008. Carl C. Collins was the director from 2008 to 2011. Scott-Lee Atchison was the director from 2012 to 2016. Dana Biggs was the director from 2017 to 2020. John Cody Birdwell was the director from 2020 to 2021. Shayna Stahl became director in 2021.

The WMB has participated in bowl games, a World Series, and performed for the Cincinnati Bengals on several occasions. The band travels four times a year to away games and was most recently invited to perform in exhibition at the Bands of America Regional Championship in Louisville. In 2008, the WMB participated in the opening ceremony of the Ryder Cup in Louisville. Several years ago the WMB was declared one of the "Top Bands in the South" by Southern Living.
