= 2022 NCAA Division I FBS football rankings =

- Season: 2022
- Bowl season: 2022–23 bowl games
- Preseason No. 1: Alabama
- End of season champions: Georgia
- Conference with most teams in final AP poll: Pac-12, SEC (6)

Two human polls and a committee's selections comprise the 2022 National Collegiate Athletic Association (NCAA) Division I Football Bowl Subdivision (FBS) football rankings, in addition to various publications' preseason polls. Unlike most sports, college football's governing body, the NCAA, does not bestow a national championship at the FBS level. Instead, that title is bestowed by one or more different polling agencies. There are two main weekly polls that begin in the preseason—the AP Poll and the Coaches Poll. One additional poll, the College Football Playoff (CFP) ranking, is usually released starting midway through the season. The CFP rankings determine who makes the four-team playoff that determines the College Football Playoff National Champion.

== Legend ==
	Increase in ranking
	Decrease in ranking
	Not ranked previous week
	Selected for College Football Playoff
(#–#)	Win–loss record
(Italics)	Number of first place votes
т	Tied with team above or below also with this symbol

== AP Poll ==
	Preseason Aug 15	Week 1 Sep 6	Week 2 Sep 11	Week 3 Sep 18	Week 4 Sep 25	Week 5 Oct 2	Week 6 Oct 9	Week 7 Oct 16	Week 8 Oct 23	Week 9 Oct 30	Week 10 Nov 6	Week 11 Nov 13	Week 12 Nov 20	Week 13 Nov 27	Week 14 Dec 4	Week 15 (Final) Jan 10	
1.	Alabama (54)	Alabama (1–0) (44)	Georgia (2–0) (53)	Georgia (3–0) (59)	Georgia (4–0) (55)	Alabama (5–0) (25)	Georgia (6–0) (32)	Georgia (7–0) (31)	Georgia (7–0) (31)	Georgia (8–0) (30)	Georgia (9–0) (62)	Georgia (10–0) (62)	Georgia (11–0) (62)	Georgia (12–0) (58)	Georgia (13–0) (62)	Georgia (15–0) (63)	1.
2.	Ohio State (6)	Georgia (1–0) (17)	Alabama (2–0) (9)	Alabama (3–0) (3)	Alabama (4–0) (4)	Georgia (5–0) (28)	Ohio State (6–0) (20)	Ohio State (6–0) (17)	Ohio State (7–0) (18)	Tennessee (8–0) т (18)	Ohio State (9–0) (1)	Ohio State (10–0) (1)	Ohio State (11–0) (1)	Michigan (12–0) (5)	Michigan (13–0) (1)	TCU (13–2)	2.
3.	Georgia (3)	Ohio State (1–0) (2)	Ohio State (2–0) (1)	Ohio State (3–0) (1)	Ohio State (4–0) (4)	Ohio State (5–0) (10)	Alabama (6–0) (11)	Tennessee (6–0) (15)	Tennessee (7–0) (13)	Ohio State (8–0) т (15)	Michigan (9–0)	Michigan (10–0)	Michigan (11–0)	TCU (12–0)	TCU (12–1)	Michigan (13–1)	3.
4.	Clemson	Michigan (1–0)	Michigan (2–0)	Michigan (3–0)	Michigan (4–0)	Michigan (5–0)	Clemson (6–0)	Michigan (7–0)	Michigan (7–0)	Michigan (8–0)	TCU (9–0)	TCU (10–0)	TCU (11–0)	USC (11–1)	Ohio State (11–1)	Ohio State (11–2)	4.
5.	Notre Dame	Clemson (1–0)	Clemson (2–0)	Clemson (3–0)	Clemson (4–0)	Clemson (5–0)	Michigan (6–0)	Clemson (7–0)	Clemson (8–0) (1)	Clemson (8–0)	Tennessee (8–1)	Tennessee (9–1)	USC (10–1)	Ohio State (11–1)	Alabama (10–2)	Alabama (11–2)	5.
6.	Texas A&M	Texas A&M (1–0)	Oklahoma (2–0)	Oklahoma (3–0)	USC (4–0)	USC (5–0)	Tennessee (5–0)	Alabama (6–1)	Alabama (7–1)	Alabama (7–1)	Oregon (8–1)	LSU (8–2)	LSU (9–2)	Alabama (10–2)	Tennessee (10–2)	Tennessee (11–2)	6.
7.	Utah	Oklahoma (1–0)	USC (2–0)	USC (3–0)	Kentucky (4–0)	Oklahoma State (4–0)	USC (6–0)	Ole Miss (7–0)	TCU (7–0)	TCU (8–0)	LSU (7–2)	USC (9–1)	Clemson (10–1)	Tennessee (10–2)	Utah (10–3)	Penn State (11–2)	7.
8.	Michigan	Notre Dame (0–1)	Oklahoma State (2–0)	Kentucky (3–0)	Tennessee (4–0)	Tennessee (4–0)	Oklahoma State (5–0)	TCU (6–0)	Oregon (6–1)	Oregon (7–1)	USC (8–1)	Alabama (8–2)	Alabama (9–2)	Penn State (10–2)	USC (11–2)	Washington (11–2)	8.
9.	Oklahoma	Baylor (1–0)	Kentucky (2–0)	Oklahoma State (3–0)	Oklahoma State (3–0)	Ole Miss (5–0)	Ole Miss (6–0)	UCLA (6–0)	Oklahoma State (6–1)	USC (7–1)	UCLA (8–1)	Clemson (9–1)	Tennessee (9–2)	Washington (10–2)	Penn State (10–2)	Tulane (12–2)	9.
10.	Baylor	USC (1–0)	Arkansas (2–0)	Arkansas (3–0)	NC State (4–0)	Penn State (5–0)	Penn State (5–0)	Oregon (5–1)	USC (6–1) т	UCLA (7–1)	Alabama (7–2)	Utah (8–2)	Oregon (9–2)	Clemson (10–2)	Clemson (11–2)	Utah (10–4)	10.
11.	Oregon	Oklahoma State (1–0)	Michigan State (2–0)	Tennessee (3–0)	Penn State (4–0)	Utah (4–1)	UCLA (6–0)	Oklahoma State (5–1)	Wake Forest (6–1) т	Ole Miss (8–1)	Ole Miss (8–1)	Penn State (8–2)	Penn State (9–2)	LSU (9–3)	Kansas State (10–3)	Florida State (10–3)	11.
12.	Oklahoma State	Florida (1–0)	BYU (2–0)	NC State (3–0)	Utah (3–1)	Oregon (4–1)	Oregon (5–1)	USC (6–1)	UCLA (6–1)	Utah (6–2)	Clemson (8–1)	Oregon (8–2)	Washington (9–2)	Utah (9–3)	Washington (10–2)	USC (11–3)	12.
13.	NC State	Utah (0–1)	Miami (FL) (2–0)	Utah (2–1)	Oregon (3–1)	Kentucky (4–1)	TCU (5–0)	Wake Forest (5–1)	Penn State (6–1)	Kansas State (6–2)	Utah (7–2)	North Carolina (9–1)	Notre Dame (8–3)	Kansas State (9–3)	Florida State (9–3)	Clemson (11–3)	13.
14.	USC	Michigan State (1–0)	Utah (1–1)	Penn State (3–0)	Ole Miss (4–0)	NC State (4–1)	Wake Forest (5–1)	Syracuse (6–0)	Utah (5–2)	Illinois (7–1)	Penn State (7–2)	Ole Miss (8–2)	Utah (8–3)	Florida State (9–3)	Tulane (11–2)	Kansas State (10–4)	14.
15.	Michigan State	Miami (FL) (1–0)	Tennessee (2–0)	Oregon (2–1)	Washington (4–0)	Wake Forest (4–1)	NC State (5–1)	Utah (5–2)	Ole Miss (7–1)	LSU (6–2)	North Carolina (8–1)	Washington (8–2)	Kansas State (8–3)	Oregon (9–3)	Oregon (9–3)	Oregon (10–3)	15.
16.	Miami (FL)	Arkansas (1–0)	NC State (2–0)	Ole Miss (3–0)	Baylor (3–1)	BYU (4–1)	Mississippi State (5–1)	Penn State (5–1)	Syracuse (6–1)	Penn State (6–2)	Tulane (8–1)	UCLA (8–2)	Florida State (8–3)	Oregon State (9–3)	LSU (9–4)	LSU (10–4)	16.
17.	Pittsburgh	Pittsburgh (1–0)	Baylor (1–1)	Baylor (2–1)	Texas A&M (3–1)	TCU (4–0)	Kansas State (5–1)	Kansas State (5–1)	Illinois (6–1)	North Carolina (7–1)	NC State (7–2)	UCF (8–2)	UCLA (8–3)	UCLA (9–3)	Oregon State (9–3)	Oregon State (10–3)	17.
18.	Wisconsin	NC State (1–0)	Florida (1–1)	Washington (3–0)	Oklahoma (3–1)	UCLA (5–0)	Syracuse (5–0)	Illinois (6–1)	LSU (6–2)	Oklahoma State (6–2)	Texas (6–3)	Notre Dame (7–3)	North Carolina (9–2)	Tulane (10–2)	UCLA (9–3)	Notre Dame (9–4)	18.
19.	Arkansas	Wisconsin (1–0)	Wake Forest (2–0)	BYU (2–1)	BYU (3–1)	Kansas (5–0)	Kansas (5–1)	Kentucky (5–2)	Kentucky (5–2)	Tulane (7–1)	Liberty (8–1)	Kansas State (7–3)	Tulane (9–2)	Notre Dame (8–4)	Notre Dame (8–4)	Troy (12–2)	19.
20.	Kentucky	Kentucky (1–0)	Ole Miss (2–0)	Florida (2–1)	Arkansas (3–1)	Kansas State (4–1)	Utah (4–2)	Texas (5–2)	Cincinnati (6–1)	Wake Forest (6–2)	Notre Dame (6–3)	Florida State (7–3)	Ole Miss (8–3)	South Carolina (8–4)	South Carolina (8–4)	Mississippi State (9–4)	20.
21.	Ole Miss	BYU (1–0)	Texas (1–1)	Wake Forest (3–0)	Minnesota (4–0)	Washington (4–1)	Cincinnati (5–1)	Cincinnati (5–1)	North Carolina (6–1)	NC State (6–2)	Illinois (7–2)	Tulane (8–2)	Cincinnati (9–2)	Texas (8–4)	Texas (8–4)	UCLA (9–4)	21.
22.	Wake Forest	Ole Miss (1–0)	Penn State (2–0)	Texas (2–1)	Wake Forest (3–1)	Syracuse (5–0)	Kentucky (4–2) т	North Carolina (6–1)	Kansas State (5–2)	Syracuse (6–2)	UCF (7–2)	Cincinnati (8–2)	Oregon State (8–3)	UCF (9–3)	UTSA (11–2)	Pittsburgh (9–4)	22.
23.	Cincinnati	Wake Forest (1–0)	Pittsburgh (1–1)	Texas A&M (2–1)	Florida State (4–0)	Mississippi State (4–1)	Texas (4–2) т	NC State (5–2)	Tulane (7–1)	Liberty (7–1)	Kansas State (6–3)	Coastal Carolina (9–1)	Coastal Carolina (9–1)	UTSA (10–2)	Troy (11–2)	South Carolina (8–5)	23.
24.	Houston	Tennessee (1–0)	Texas A&M (1–1)	Pittsburgh (2–1)	Pittsburgh (3–1)	Cincinnati (4–1)	Illinois (5–1)	Mississippi State (5–2)	NC State (5–2)	Oregon State (6–2)	Washington (7–2)	Oklahoma State (7–3)	Texas (7–4)	North Carolina (9–3)	Mississippi State (8–4)	Fresno State (10–4)	24.
25.	BYU	Houston (1–0)	Oregon (1–1)	Miami (FL) (2–1)	Kansas State (3–1)	LSU (4–1)	James Madison (5–0)	Tulane (6–1)	South Carolina (5–2)	UCF (6–2)	Florida State (6–3)	Oregon State (7–3)	UCF (8–3)	Mississippi State (8–4)	NC State (8–4)	Texas (8–5)	25.
	Preseason Aug 15	Week 1 Sep 6	Week 2 Sep 11	Week 3 Sep 18	Week 4 Sep 25	Week 5 Oct 2	Week 6 Oct 9	Week 7 Oct 16	Week 8 Oct 23	Week 9 Oct 30	Week 10 Nov 6	Week 11 Nov 13	Week 12 Nov 20	Week 13 Nov 27	Week 14 Dec 4	Week 15 (Final) Jan 10	
		Dropped: Oregon (0–1); Cincinnati (0–1)	Dropped: Notre Dame (0–2); Wisconsin (1–1); Houston (1–1)	Dropped: Michigan State (2–1)	Dropped: Florida (2–2); Texas (2–2); Miami (FL) (2–2)	Dropped: Baylor (3–2); Texas A&M (3–2); Oklahoma (3–2); Arkansas (3–2); Minnesota (4–1); Florida State (4–1); Pittsburgh (3–2)	Dropped: BYU (4–2); Washington (4–2); LSU (4–2)	Dropped: Kansas (5–2); James Madison (5–1)	Dropped: Texas (5–3); Mississippi State (5–3)	Dropped: Kentucky (5–3); Cincinnati (6–2); South Carolina (5–3)	Dropped: Oklahoma State (6–3); Wake Forest (6–3); Syracuse (6–3); Oregon State (6–3)	Dropped: NC State (7–3); Texas (6–4); Liberty (8–2); Illinois (7–3)	Dropped: Oklahoma State (7–4)	Dropped: Ole Miss (8–4); Cincinnati (9–3); Coastal Carolina (9–2)	Dropped: UCF (9–4); North Carolina (9–4)	Dropped: UTSA (11–3); NC State (8–5)	

=== Ranking highlights ===
Preseason

== Coaches Poll ==
	Preseason Aug 8	Week 1 Sep 6	Week 2 Sep 11	Week 3 Sep 18	Week 4 Sep 25	Week 5 Oct 2	Week 6 Oct 9	Week 7 Oct 15	Week 8 Oct 23	Week 9 Oct 30	Week 10 Nov 6	Week 11 Nov 13	Week 12 Nov 20	Week 13 Nov 27	Week 14 Dec 4	Week 15 (Final) Jan 10	
1.	Alabama (54)	Alabama (1–0) (57)	Alabama (2–0) (39)	Georgia (3–0) (40)	Georgia (4–0) (34)	Alabama (5–0) (34)	Alabama (6–0) (35)	Georgia (7–0) (43)	Georgia (7–0) (43)	Georgia (8–0) (45)	Georgia (9–0) (61)	Georgia (10–0) (61)	Georgia (11–0) (59)	Georgia (12–0) (60)	Georgia (13–0) (59)	Georgia (15–0) (63)	1.
2.	Ohio State (5)	Georgia (1–0) (6)	Georgia (2–0) (25)	Alabama (3–0) (24)	Alabama (4–0) (26)	Georgia (5–0) (23)	Georgia (6–0) (18)	Ohio State (6–0) (17)	Ohio State (7–0) (17)	Ohio State (8–0) (13)	Ohio State (9–0)	Ohio State (10–0) (1)	Ohio State (11–0) (1)	Michigan (12–0) (3)	Michigan (13–0) (2)	TCU (13–2)	2.
3.	Georgia (6)	Ohio State (1–0) (2)	Ohio State (2–0) (1)	Ohio State (3–0) (1)	Ohio State (4–0) (4)	Ohio State (5–0) (7)	Ohio State (6–0) (10)	Michigan (7–0) (1)	Tennessee (7–0) (2)	Tennessee (8–0) (5)	Michigan (9–0) (2)	Michigan (10–0) (1)	Michigan (11–0) (2)	TCU (12–0)	Ohio State (11–1)	Michigan (13–1)	3.
4.	Clemson	Clemson (1–0)	Clemson (2–0)	Michigan (3–0)	Michigan (4–0)	Michigan (5–0)	Michigan (6–0)	Tennessee (6–0) (2)	Michigan (7–0) (1)	Michigan (8–0)	TCU (9–0)	TCU (10–0)	TCU (11–0)	USC (11–1)	TCU (12–1)	Ohio State (11–2)	4.
5.	Notre Dame	Michigan (1–0)	Michigan (2–0)	Clemson (3–0)	Clemson (4–0)	Clemson (5–0)	Clemson (6–0)	Clemson (7–0)	Clemson (8–0)	Clemson (8–0)	Tennessee (8–1)	Tennessee (9–1)	USC (10–1)	Ohio State (11–1)	Alabama (10–2)	Alabama (11–2)	5.
6.	Michigan	Texas A&M (1–0)	Oklahoma (2–0)	Oklahoma (3–0)	USC (4–0)	USC (5–0)	USC (6–0)	Alabama (6–1)	Alabama (7–1)	Alabama (7–1)	Oregon (8–1)	USC (9–1)	LSU (9–2)	Alabama (10–2)	Tennessee (10–2)	Tennessee (11–2)	6.
7.	Texas A&M	Oklahoma (1–0)	Oklahoma State (2–0)	USC (3–0)	Oklahoma State (3–0)	Oklahoma State (4–0)	Oklahoma State (5–0)	Ole Miss (7–0)	TCU (7–0)	TCU (8–0)	USC (8–1)	LSU (8–2)	Alabama (9–2)	Penn State (10–2)	Penn State (10–2)	Penn State (11–2)	7.
8.	Utah	Baylor (1–0)	USC (2–0)	Oklahoma State (3–0)	Kentucky (4–0)	Tennessee (4–0)	Tennessee (5–0)	TCU (6–0)	Oregon (6–1)	Oregon (7–1)	LSU (7–2)	Alabama (8–2)	Clemson (10–1)	Tennessee (10–2)	USC (10–2)	Washington (11–2)	8.
9.	Oklahoma	Notre Dame (0–1)	Michigan State (2–0)	Kentucky (3–0)	Tennessee (4–0)	Ole Miss (5–0)	Ole Miss (6–0)	Oregon (5–1)	Oklahoma State (6–1)	USC (7–1)	Ole Miss (8–1)	Clemson (9–1)	Oregon (9–2)	Washington (10–2)	Kansas State (10–3)	Tulane (12–2)	9.
10.	Baylor	Oklahoma State (1–0)	Kentucky (2–0)	Arkansas (3–0)	NC State (4–0)	Penn State (5–0)	Penn State (5–0)	UCLA (6–0)	Wake Forest (6–1)	Ole Miss (8–1)	UCLA (8–1)	Utah (8–2)	Penn State (9–2)	Kansas State (9–3)	Utah (10–3)	Florida State (10–3)	10.
11.	Oklahoma State	Michigan State (1–0)	Arkansas (2–0)	NC State (3–0)	Ole Miss (4–0)	Utah (4–1)	UCLA (6–0)	Oklahoma State (5–1)	USC (6–1)	UCLA (7–1)	Alabama (7–2)	North Carolina (9–1)	Tennessee (9–2)	Clemson (10–2)	Clemson (11–2)	Utah (10–4)	11.
12.	Oregon	USC (1–0)	NC State (2–0)	Tennessee (3–0)	Penn State (4–0)	Oregon (4–1)	Oregon (5-1)	USC (6–1)	Ole Miss (7–1)	Utah (6–2)	Clemson (8–1)	Penn State (8–2)	Washington (9–2)	Utah (9–3)	Washington (10–2)	Clemson (11–3)	12.
13.	NC State	NC State (1–0)	Miami (FL) (2–0)	Ole Miss (3–0)	Utah (3–1)	Kentucky (4–1)	NC State (5–1)	Wake Forest (5–1)	Penn State (6–1)	Illinois (7–1)	Utah (7–2)	Oregon (8–2)	Kansas State (8–3)	LSU (9–3)	Florida State (9–3)	USC (11–3)	13.
14.	Michigan State	Pittsburgh (1–0)	BYU (2–0)	Utah (2–1)	Baylor (3–1)	NC State (4–1)	Wake Forest (5–1)	Syracuse (6–0)	Utah (5–2)	Kansas State (6–2)	North Carolina (8–1)	Ole Miss (8–2)	Utah (8–3)	Florida State (9–3)	Oregon (9–3)	Kansas State (10–4)	14.
15.	USC	Utah (0–1)	Utah (1–1)	Penn State (3–0)	Oregon (3–1)	Wake Forest (4–1)	TCU (5–0)	Utah (5–2)	UCLA (6–1)	North Carolina (7–1)	Penn State (7–2)	Washington (8–2)	Notre Dame (8–3)	Oregon (9–3)	LSU (9–4)	LSU (10–4)	15.
16.	Pittsburgh	Miami (FL) (1–0)	Tennessee (2–0)	Wake Forest (3–0)	Oklahoma (3–1)	BYU (4–1)	Kansas State (5–1)	Penn State (5–1)	Syracuse (6–1)	Penn State (6–2)	NC State (7–2)	UCLA (8–2)	Florida State (8–3)	Oregon State (9–3)	Oregon State (9–3)	Oregon (10–3)	16.
17.	Miami (FL)	Arkansas (1–0)	Ole Miss (2–0)	Baylor (2–1)	Texas A&M (3–1)	Kansas (5–0)	Mississippi State (5–1)	Kansas State (5–1)	Kentucky (5–2)	LSU (6–2)	Tulane (8–1)	Kansas State (7–3)	North Carolina (9–2)	UCLA (9–3)	Tulane (11–2)	Oregon State (10–3)	17.
18.	Texas (1)	Wisconsin (1–0)	Wake Forest (2–0)	Oregon (2–1)	Washington (4–0)	TCU (4–0)	Syracuse (5–0)	Kentucky (5–2)	Illinois (6–1)	Oklahoma State (6–2)	Texas (6–3)	UCF (8–2)	UCLA (8–3)	Tulane (10–2)	UCLA (9–3)	Notre Dame (9–4)	18.
19.	Wake Forest	Florida (1–0)	Baylor (1–1)	Texas (2–1)	Arkansas (3–1)	UCLA (5–0)	Utah (4–2)	Cincinnati (5–1)	Cincinnati (6–1)	Wake Forest (6–2)	Liberty (8–1)	Notre Dame (7–3)	Ole Miss (8–3)	Notre Dame (8–4)	South Carolina (8–4)	Mississippi State (9–4)	19.
20.	Wisconsin	Kentucky (1–0)	Texas (1–1)	Texas A&M (2–1)	BYU (3–1)	Kansas State (4–1)	Kansas (5–1)	Illinois (6–1)	LSU (6–2)	NC State (6–2)	Illinois (7–2)	Florida State (7–3)	Tulane (9–2)	South Carolina (8–4)	Notre Dame (8–4)	Troy (12–2)	20.
21.	Kentucky	Wake Forest (1–0)	Florida (1–1)	Michigan State (2–1)	Wake Forest (3–1)	Syracuse (5–0)	Cincinnati (5–1)	Texas (5–2)	North Carolina (6–1)	Tulane (7–1)	UCF (7–2)	Cincinnati (8–2)	Cincinnati (9–2)	Texas (8–4)	Texas (8–4)	UCLA (9–4)	21.
22.	Cincinnati	Texas (1–0)	Texas A&M (1–1)	Florida (2–1)	Florida State (4–0)	Baylor (3–2)	Kentucky (4–2)	North Carolina (6–1)	Kansas State (5–2)	Syracuse (6–2)	Kansas State (6–3)	Tulane (8–2)	Oregon State (8–3)	North Carolina (9–3)	UTSA (11–2)	Pittsburgh (9–4)	22.
23.	Arkansas	Ole Miss (1–0)	Penn State (2–0)	BYU (2–1)	Minnesota (4–0)	Mississippi State (4–1)	Baylor (3–2)	NC State (5–2)	NC State (5–2)	Liberty (7–1)	Washington (7–2)	Coastal Carolina (9–1)	Coastal Carolina (9–1)	UCF (9–3)	Mississippi State (8–4)	South Carolina (8–5)	23.
24.	Ole Miss	Oregon (0–1)	Oregon (1–1)	Washington (3–0)	Pittsburgh (3–1)	Washington (4–1)	Texas (4–2)	Mississippi State (5–2)	Tulane (7–1)	Kentucky (5–3)	Kentucky (6–3)	Oklahoma State (7–3)	Texas (7–4)	UTSA (10–2)	Troy (11–2)	Fresno State (10–4)	24.
25.	Houston	BYU (1–0)	Pittsburgh (1–1)	Miami (FL) (2–1)	Syracuse (4–0)	Arkansas (3–2)	North Carolina (5–1)	Tulane (6–1)	South Carolina (5–2)	UCF (6–2)	Notre Dame (6–3)	NC State (7–3)	UTSA (9–2)	Mississippi State (8–4)	North Carolina (9–4)	Texas (8–5)	25.
	Preseason Aug 8	Week 1 Sep 6	Week 2 Sep 11	Week 3 Sep 18	Week 4 Sep 25	Week 5 Oct 2	Week 6 Oct 9	Week 7 Oct 15	Week 8 Oct 23	Week 9 Oct 30	Week 10 Nov 6	Week 11 Nov 13	Week 12 Nov 20	Week 13 Nov 27	Week 14 Dec 4	Week 15 (Final) Jan 10	
		Dropped: Cincinnati (0–1); Houston (1–0)	Dropped: Notre Dame (0–2); Wisconsin (1–1)	Dropped: Pittsburgh (2–1)	Dropped: Texas (2–2); Michigan State (2–2); Florida (2–2); Miami (FL) (2–2)	Dropped: Oklahoma (3–2); Texas A&M (3–2); Florida State (4–1); Minnesota (4–1); Pittsburgh (3–2)	Dropped: BYU (4–2); Washington (4–2); Arkansas (3–3)	Dropped: Kansas (5–2); Baylor (3–3)	Dropped: Texas (5–3); Mississippi State (5–3)	Dropped: Cincinnati (6–2); South Carolina (5–3)	Dropped: Oklahoma State (6–3); Wake Forest (6–3); Syracuse (6–3)	Dropped: Texas (6–4); Liberty (8–2); Illinois (7–3); Kentucky (6–4)	Dropped: UCF (8–3); Oklahoma State (7–4); NC State (7–4)	Dropped: Ole Miss (8–4); Cincinnati (9–3); Coastal Carolina (9–2)	Dropped: UCF (9-4)	Dropped: UTSA (11–3); North Carolina (9–5)	

== CFP rankings ==
The initial 2022 College Football Playoff rankings were released on November 1, 2022.

	Week 9 Nov 1	Week 10 Nov 8	Week 11 Nov 15	Week 12 Nov 22	Week 13 Nov 29	Week 14 (Final) Dec 4	
1.	Tennessee (8–0)	Georgia (9–0)	Georgia (10–0)	Georgia (11–0)	Georgia (12–0)	Georgia (13–0)	1.
2.	Ohio State (8–0)	Ohio State (9–0)	Ohio State (10–0)	Ohio State (11–0)	Michigan (12–0)	Michigan (13–0)	2.
3.	Georgia (8–0)	Michigan (9–0)	Michigan (10–0)	Michigan (11–0)	TCU (12–0)	TCU (12–1)	3.
4.	Clemson (8–0)	TCU (9–0)	TCU (10–0)	TCU (11–0)	USC (11–1)	Ohio State (11–1)	4.
5.	Michigan (8–0)	Tennessee (8–1)	Tennessee (9–1)	LSU (9–2)	Ohio State (11–1)	Alabama (10–2)	5.
6.	Alabama (7–1)	Oregon (8–1)	LSU (8–2)	USC (10–1)	Alabama (10–2)	Tennessee (10–2)	6.
7.	TCU (8–0)	LSU (7–2)	USC (9–1)	Alabama (9–2)	Tennessee (10–2)	Clemson (11–2)	7.
8.	Oregon (7–1)	USC (8–1)	Alabama (8–2)	Clemson (10–1)	Penn State (10–2)	Utah (10–3)	8.
9.	USC (7–1)	Alabama (7–2)	Clemson (9–1)	Oregon (9–2)	Clemson (10–2)	Kansas State (10–3)	9.
10.	LSU (6–2)	Clemson (8–1)	Utah (8–2)	Tennessee (9–2)	Kansas State (9–3)	USC (11–2)	10.
11.	Ole Miss (8–1)	Ole Miss (8–1)	Penn State (8–2)	Penn State (9–2)	Utah (9–3)	Penn State (10–2)	11.
12.	UCLA (7–1)	UCLA (8–1)	Oregon (8–2)	Kansas State (8–3)	Washington (10–2)	Washington (10–2)	12.
13.	Kansas State (6–2)	Utah (7–2)	North Carolina (9–1)	Washington (9–2)	Florida State (9–3)	Florida State (9–3)	13.
14.	Utah (6–2)	Penn State (7–2)	Ole Miss (8–2)	Utah (8–3)	LSU (9–3)	Oregon State (9–3)	14.
15.	Penn State (6–2)	North Carolina (8–1)	Kansas State (7–3)	Notre Dame (8–3)	Oregon State (9–3)	Oregon (9–3)	15.
16.	Illinois (7–1)	NC State (7–2)	UCLA (8–2)	Florida State (8–3)	Oregon (9–3)	Tulane (11–2)	16.
17.	North Carolina (7–1)	Tulane (8–1)	Washington (8–2)	North Carolina (9–2)	UCLA (9–3)	LSU (9–4)	17.
18.	Oklahoma State (6–2)	Texas (6–3)	Notre Dame (7–3)	UCLA (8–3)	Tulane (10–2)	UCLA (9–3)	18.
19.	Tulane (7–1)	Kansas State (6–3)	Florida State (7–3)	Tulane (9–2)	South Carolina (8–4)	South Carolina (8–4)	19.
20.	Syracuse (6–2)	Notre Dame (6–3)	UCF (8–2)	Ole Miss (8–3)	Texas (8–4)	Texas (8–4)	20.
21.	Wake Forest (6–2)	Illinois (7–2)	Tulane (8–2)	Oregon State (8–3)	Notre Dame (8–4)	Notre Dame (8–4)	21.
22.	NC State (6–2)	UCF (7–2)	Oklahoma State (7–3)	UCF (8–3)	UCF (9–3)	Mississippi State (8–4)	22.
23.	Oregon State (6–2)	Florida State (6–3)	Oregon State (7–3)	Texas (7–4)	North Carolina (9–3)	NC State (8–4)	23.
24.	Texas (5–3)	Kentucky (6–3)	NC State (7–3)	Cincinnati (9–2)	Mississippi State (8–4)	Troy (11–2)	24.
25.	UCF (6–2)	Washington (7–2)	Cincinnati (8–2)	Louisville (7–4)	NC State (8–4)	UTSA (11–2)	25.
	Week 9 Nov 1	Week 10 Nov 8	Week 11 Nov 15	Week 12 Nov 22	Week 13 Nov 29	Week 14 (Final) Dec 4	
		Dropped: Oklahoma State (6–3); Syracuse (6–3); Wake Forest (6–3); Oregon State (6–3)	Dropped: Texas (6–4); Illinois (7–3); Kentucky (6–4)	Dropped: Oklahoma State (7–4); NC State (7–4)	Dropped: Ole Miss (8–4); Cincinnati (9–3); Louisville (7–5)	Dropped: UCF (9–4); North Carolina (9–4)	

=== Ranking highlights ===
Week 9

- Tennessee was ranked No. 1 for the first time in the CFP rankings, their previous high was No. 17.
- Illinois (No. 16), Tulane (No. 19), and Oregon State (No. 23) were all ranked in the CFP rankings for the first time since the format was adopted in 2014.
- Oklahoma's streak of 41 consecutive weeks in the CFP rankings ended, the Sooners overall have the third most appearances in the CFP rankings at 46 weeks, tied with Clemson.

== FWAA-NFF Super 16 Poll ==
The joint poll of the Football Writers Association of America and National Football Foundation is a human poll which the NCAA Football Bowl Subdivision Records book designates as being one of the "major selectors" of national championships. The NFF automatically awards its MacArthur Bowl National Championship Trophy to the winner of the College Football Playoff National Championship.

	Preseason Aug 16	Week 1 Sep 6	Week 2 Sep 11	Week 3 Sep 18	Week 4 Sep 25	Week 5 Oct 2	Week 6 Oct 9	Week 7 Oct 16	Week 8 Oct 23	Week 9 Oct 30	Week 10 Nov 6	Week 11 Nov 13	Week 12 Nov 20	Week 13 Nov 27	Week 14 (Final) Dec 4	
1.	Alabama (42)	Alabama (1–0) (32)	Georgia (2–0) (39)	Georgia (3–0) (47)	Georgia (4–0) (38)	Alabama (5–0) (15)	Georgia (6–0) (21)	Georgia (7–0) (31)	Georgia (7–0) (31)	Georgia (8–0) (33)	Georgia (9–0) (50)	Georgia (10–0) (49)	Georgia (11–0) (50)	Georgia (12–0) (45)	Georgia (13–0) (51)	1.
2.	Ohio State (6)	Georgia (1–0) (17)	Alabama (2–0) (10)	Alabama (3–0) (1)	Alabama (4–0) (5)	Georgia (5–0) (21)	Ohio State (6–0) (19)	Ohio State (6–0) (14)	Ohio State (7–0) (15)	Tennessee (8–0) (12)	Ohio State (9–0) (2)	Ohio State (10–0) (3)	Ohio State (11–0) (2)	Michigan (12–0) (7)	Michigan (13–0) (1)	2.
3.	Georgia (4)	Ohio State (1–0) (3)	Ohio State (2–0) (3)	Ohio State (3–0) (4)	Ohio State (4–0) (9)	Ohio State (5–0) (16)	Alabama (6–0) (10)	Tennessee (6–0) (6)	Tennessee (7–0) (5)	Ohio State (8–0) (7)	Michigan (9–0)	Michigan (10–0)	Michigan (11–0)	TCU (12–0)	Ohio State (11–1)	3.
4.	Clemson	Michigan (1–0)	Michigan (2–0)	Michigan (3–0)	Michigan (4–0)	Clemson (5–0)	Clemson (6–0) (1)	Michigan (7–0)	Michigan (7–0)	Michigan (8–0)	TCU (9–0)	TCU (10–0)	TCU (11–0)	USC (11–1)	TCU (12–1)	4.
5.	Michigan	Clemson (1–0)	Clemson (2–0)	Oklahoma (3–0)	Clemson (4–0)	Michigan (5–0)	Michigan (6–0)	Clemson (7–0) (1)	Clemson (8–0) (1)	Clemson (8–0)	Tennessee (8–1)	Tennessee (9–1)	USC (10–1)	Ohio State (11–1)	Alabama (10–2)	5.
6.	Notre Dame	Oklahoma (1–0)	Oklahoma (2–0)	Clemson (3–0)	USC (4–0)	Oklahoma State (4–0)	Tennessee (5–0) (1)	Alabama (6–1)	Alabama (7–1)	Alabama (7–1)	Oregon (8–1)	LSU (8–2)	LSU (9–2)	Alabama (10–2)	Tennessee (10–2)	6.
7.	Utah	Texas A&M (1–0)	USC (2–0)	USC (3–0)	Tennessee (4–0)	USC (5–0)	USC (6–0)	TCU (6–0)	TCU (7–0)	TCU (8–0)	LSU (7–2)	USC (9–1)	Clemson (10–1)	Penn State (10–2)	Utah (10–3)	7.
8.	Texas A&M	Baylor (1–0)	Oklahoma State (2–0)	Oklahoma State (3–0)	Oklahoma State (3–0)	Tennessee (4–0)	Oklahoma State (5–0)	Ole Miss (7–0)	Oregon (6–1)	Oregon (7–1)	USC (8–1)	Alabama (8–2)	Alabama (9–2)	Tennessee (10–2)	Penn State (10–2)	8.
9.	Oklahoma	Notre Dame (0–1)	Arkansas (2–0)	Kentucky (3–0)	Kentucky (4–0)	Penn State (5–0)	Ole Miss (6–0)	UCLA (6–0)	Oklahoma State (6–1)	USC (7–1)	UCLA (8–1)	Clemson (9–1)	Tennessee (9–2)	Washington (10–2)	Kansas State (10–3)	9.
10.	Baylor	USC (1–0)	Kentucky (2–0)	Arkansas (3–0)	Penn State (4–0)	Ole Miss (5–0)	Penn State (5–0)	Oregon (5–1)	USC (6–1)	UCLA (7–1)	Alabama (7–2)	Utah (8–2)	Oregon (9–2)	Clemson (10–2)	Clemson (11–2)	10.
11.	Oklahoma State	Oklahoma State (1–0)	Michigan State (2–0)	Tennessee (3–0)	NC State (4–0)	Utah (4–1)	UCLA (6–0)	Oklahoma State (5–1)	Wake Forest (6–1)	Ole Miss (8–1)	Ole Miss (8–1)	Penn State (8–2)	Penn State (9–2)	Kansas State (9–3)	USC (11–2)	11.
12.	Oregon	Florida (1–0)	BYU (2–0)	Penn State (3–0)	Utah (3–1)	Oregon (5–0)	TCU (5–0)	USC (6–1)	Penn State (6–1)	Utah (6–2)	Clemson (8–1)	North Carolina (9–1)	Washington (9–2)	Utah (9–3)	Washington (10–2)	12.
13.	USC	Arkansas (1–0)	Miami (FL) (2–0)	NC State (3–0)	Washington (4–0)	TCU (4–0)	Oregon (5–1)	Syracuse (6–0)	UCLA (6–1)	Illinois (7–1)	Utah (7–2)	Oregon (8–2)	Kansas State (8–3)	LSU (9–3)	Florida State (9–3)	13.
14.	NC State	Michigan State (1–0)	Tennessee (2–0)	Utah (2–1)	Ole Miss (4–0)	UCLA (5–0)	Wake Forest (5–1)	Wake Forest (5–1)	Ole Miss (7–1)	Kansas State (6–2)	Penn State (7–2)	Ole Miss (8–2)	Utah (8–3)	Florida State (9–3)	Tulane (11–2)	14.
15.	Michigan State	Miami (FL) (1–0)	Utah (1–1)	Ole Miss (3–0)	Oregon (3–1)	Kentucky (4–1)	NC State (5–1)	Utah (5–2)	Utah (5–2)	LSU (6–2)	North Carolina (8–1)	UCLA (8–2)	Notre Dame (8–3)	Oregon (9–3)	LSU (9–4)	15.
16.	Miami (FL)	Utah (0–1)	NC State (2–0)	Washington (3–0)	Oklahoma (3–1)	Kansas (5–0)	Mississippi State (5–1)	Penn State (5–1)	LSU (6–2)	Penn State (6–2)	Tulane (8–1)	Washington (8–2)	UCLA (8–3)	UCLA (9–3)	Oregon (9–3)	16.
	Preseason Aug 16	Week 1 Sep 6	Week 2 Sep 11	Week 3 Sep 18	Week 4 Sep 25	Week 5 Oct 2	Week 6 Oct 9	Week 7 Oct 16	Week 8 Oct 23	Week 9 Oct 30	Week 10 Nov 6	Week 11 Nov 13	Week 12 Nov 20	Week 13 Nov 27	Week 14 (Final) Dec 4	
		Dropped: Oregon (0–1); NC State (1–0)	Dropped: Notre Dame (0–2); Texas A&M (1–1); Baylor (1–1); Florida (1–1)	Dropped: Michigan State (2–1); BYU (2–1); Miami (FL) (2–1)	Dropped: Arkansas (3–1)	Dropped: NC State (4–1); Washington (4–1); Oklahoma (3–2)	Dropped: Utah (4–2); Kentucky (4–2); Kansas (5–1)	Dropped: NC State (5–2); Mississippi State (5–2)	Dropped: Syracuse (6–1)	Dropped: Oklahoma State (6–2); Wake Forest (6–2)	Dropped: Illinois (7–2); Kansas State (6–3)	Dropped: Tulane (8–2)	Dropped: North Carolina (9–2); Ole Miss (8–3)	Dropped: Notre Dame (8–4)	Dropped: UCLA (9–3)	
