= Drew Stevens =

American football player (born 2003)

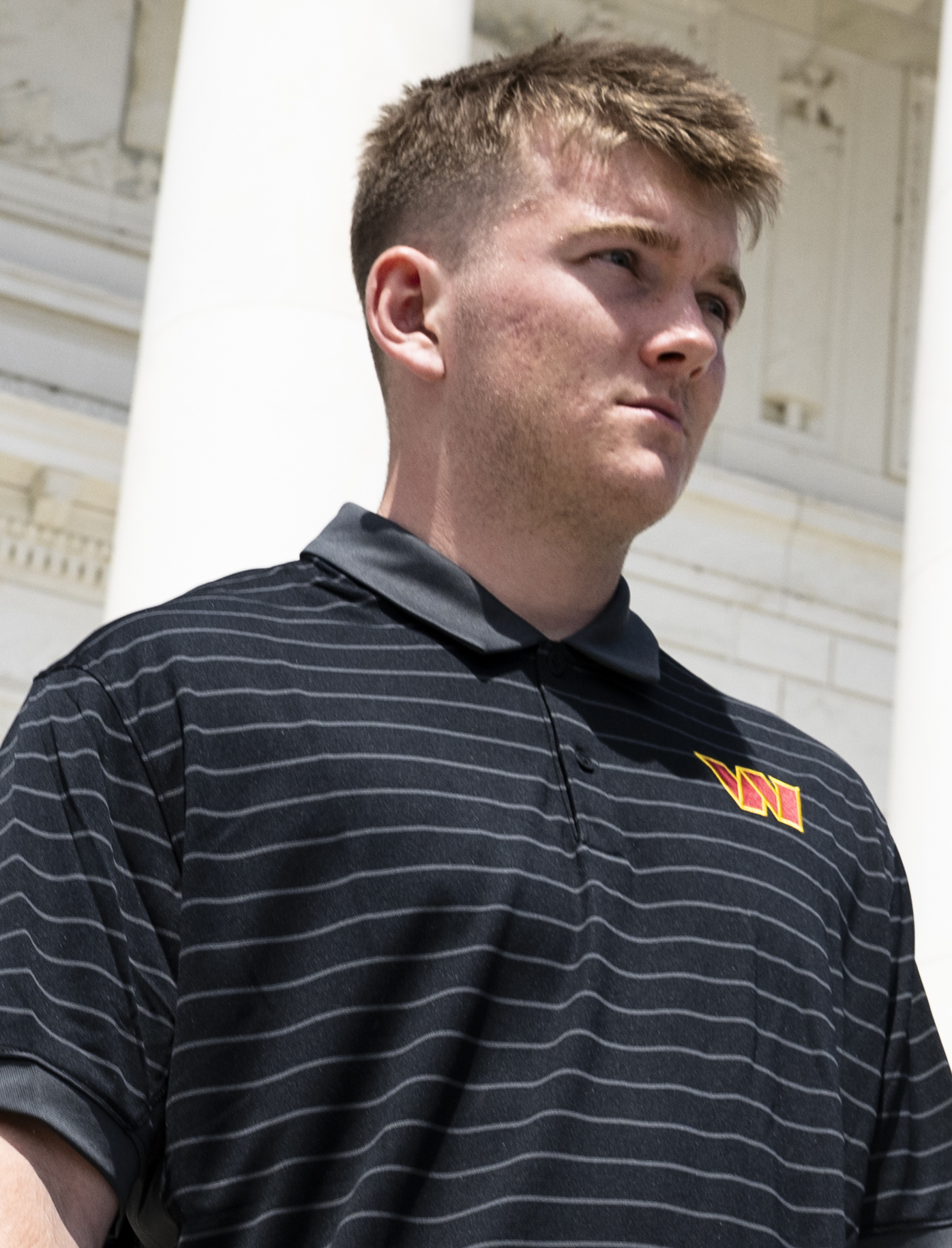
- Stevens with the Washington Commanders in 2026

No. 19 – Washington Commanders
- Position: Kicker
- Roster status: Active

Personal information
- Born: December 9, 2003 (age 22); Augusta, Georgia, U.S.
- Listed height: 6 ft 1 in (1.85 m)
- Listed weight: 213 lb (97 kg)

Career information
- High school: North Augusta (North Augusta, South Carolina)
- College: Iowa (2022–2025)
- NFL draft: 2026: undrafted

Career history
- Washington Commanders (2026–present)

Awards and highlights
- Second-team All-Big Ten (2022); 3× third-team All-Big Ten (2023, 2024, 2025)

Career NFL statistics as of Week 4, 2026
- Field goals made: 7
- Field goals attempted: 9
- Field goal %: 77.8
- Points: 28
- Longest field goal: 57
- Touchbacks: 4
- Stats at Pro Football Reference

Drew Stevens (born December 9, 2003) is an American professional football kicker for the Washington Commanders of the National Football League (NFL). Stevens played college football for the Iowa Hawkeyes and signed with the Commanders as an undrafted free agent in 2026.

== Early life ==
Stevens attended North Augusta High School in North Augusta, South Carolina. Coming out of high school, he was rated as a five-star kicking prospect and #10 in the Nation per Kohl's Kicking, where he committed to play college football for the Iowa Hawkeyes after receiving 11 offers including interest from schools such as Coastal Carolina, NC State, South Carolina, Georgia Tech, Old Dominion, Navy, Clemson, and Virginia Tech.

== College career ==
In week 13 of the 2022 season, Stevens booted a game-winning 21-yard field goal against Minnesota. As a freshman in 2022, he went 16 for 18 on his field goal attempts while making all 24 of his extra points. In week 11 of the 2023 season, Stevens succeeded on a game-winning 53-yard field goal versus Northwestern. He finished the 2023 season, converting on 18 of his 26 field goal attempts. In the 2024 regular season finale, Stevens made the game-winning 53-yard field goal versus rival Nebraska. He finished his junior year in 2024, going 20 for 23 on his field goals. In week 8 of the 2025 season, Stevens set the program record for most career field goals with 68 made kicks and finished his career with 76 made Field Goals at Iowa. In week 11, he made a career-long 58-yard field goal versus Oregon. In week 13, Stevens kicked a game-winning 44-yard field goal on Senior Night versus Michigan State. After the conclusion of the 2025 season, Drew had set 12 Iowa school records including Most FG's Made (76) which is also 4th most all-time in the BigTen, Longest FG Made (58), and most 50+ yard FG's made (12). In December 2025, Drew accepted an invite to participate in the 2026 Senior Bowl where went 1/1 in the game making a 51 yard field goal. He was also 1 of 3 Kickers officially invited to the 2026 NFL Combine.

College statistics
Kicking
Season	Games	FGM	FGA	Pct	Lng	XPM	XPA	Pct	Pts
2022	13	16	18	88.9	54	24	24	100.0	72
2023	14	18	26	69.2	53	19	20	95.0	73
2024	13	20	23	87.0	54	40	40	100.0	100
2025	13	22	28	78.6	58	41	42	97.6	107
Career	53	76	95	80.0	58	124	126	98.4	352

== Professional career ==
Pre-draft measurables
Height	Weight	Arm length	Hand span	Wingspan
6 ft 1 1/8 in (1.86 m)	213 lb (97 kg)	29 7/8 in (0.76 m)	9 1/4 in (0.23 m)	6 ft 1 1/4 in (1.86 m)
All values from NFL Combine

Stevens signed with the Washington Commanders as an undrafted free agent on May 7, 2026. He performed well throughout training camp and won the placekicking job when the Commanders released Jake Moody on August 18.
