= 2021 Iowa Hawkeyes football team =

American college football season

2021 Iowa Hawkeyes football

Big Ten West Division champion

Big Ten Championship Game, L 3–42 vs. Michigan

Citrus Bowl, L 17–20 vs. Kentucky (Kentucky win vacated)
- Conference: Big Ten Conference
- West Division

Ranking
- Coaches: No. 23
- AP: No. 23
- Record: 10–4 (7–2 Big Ten)
- Head coach: Kirk Ferentz (23rd season)
- Offensive coordinator: Brian Ferentz (5th season)
- Offensive scheme: Multiple
- Defensive coordinator: Phil Parker (10th season)
- Base defense: 4–2–5
- Home stadium: Kinnick Stadium

2021 Big Ten Conference football standings
	Conf.			Overall
Team	W		L	W		L
East Division
No. 3 Michigan xy$^	8	–	1	12	–	2
No. 6 Ohio State x	8	–	1	11	–	2
No. 9 Michigan State	7	–	2	11	–	2
Penn State	4	–	5	7	–	6
Maryland	3	–	6	7	–	6
Rutgers	2	–	7	5	–	8
Indiana	0	–	9	2	–	10
West Division
No. 23 Iowa xy	7	–	2	10	–	4
Minnesota	6	–	3	9	–	4
Wisconsin	6	–	3	9	–	4
Purdue	6	–	3	9	–	4
Illinois	4	–	5	5	–	7
Nebraska	1	–	8	3	–	9
Northwestern	1	–	8	3	–	9
Championship: Michigan 42, Iowa 3
^ – College Football Playoff participant; $ – Conference champion; x – Division champion/co-champions; y – Championship game participant; Rankings from AP Poll

The 2021 Iowa Hawkeyes football team represented the University of Iowa during the 2021 NCAA Division I FBS football season. The Hawkeyes played their home games at Kinnick Stadium in Iowa City, Iowa, and competed in the West Division of the Big Ten Conference. They were led by 23rd-year head coach Kirk Ferentz.

With a victory over rival Nebraska on November 26 coupled with a Wisconsin loss to Minnesota the following day, Iowa won its first Big Ten West title since 2015. They competed in the Big Ten Championship Game against East Division co-champion Michigan, where they lost by a 39-point margin. Iowa capped the 2021 season with a frustrating 20–17 loss to No. 22 Kentucky in the Citrus Bowl. The Hawkeyes finished with a record of 10–4 (7–2 B1G), the seventh season with 10+ wins in the Ferentz era.

Junior center Tyler Linderbaum was named Big Ten Offensive Lineman of the Year, unanimous First-team All-American, and was awarded the Rimington Trophy. He later became the 11th Iowa player of the Ferentz era taken in the first round of the NFL Draft.

== Schedule ==
Date	Time	Opponent	Rank	Site	TV	Result	Attendance
September 4	2:30 p.m.	No. 17 Indiana	No. 18	Kinnick Stadium; Iowa City, IA	BTN	W 34–6	68,166
September 11	3:30 p.m.	at No. 9 Iowa State*	No. 10	Jack Trice Stadium; Ames, IA (rivalry, College GameDay)	ABC	W 27–17	61,500
September 18	2:30 p.m.	Kent State*	No. 5	Kinnick Stadium; Iowa City, IA	BTN	W 30–7	61,932
September 25	2:30 p.m.	Colorado State*	No. 5	Kinnick Stadium; Iowa City, IA	FS1	W 24–14	65,456
October 1	7:00 p.m.	at Maryland	No. 5	Maryland Stadium; College Park, MD	FS1	W 51–14	45,527
October 9	3:00 p.m.	No. 4 Penn State	No. 3	Kinnick Stadium; Iowa City, IA (Big Noon Kickoff)	FOX	W 23–20	69,250
October 16	2:30 p.m.	Purdue^{†}	No. 2	Kinnick Stadium; Iowa City, IA	ABC	L 7–24	69,250
October 30	11:00 a.m.	at Wisconsin	No. 9	Camp Randall Stadium; Madison, WI (rivalry)	ESPN	L 7–27	74,209
November 6	6:00 p.m.	at Northwestern	No. 22	Ryan Field; Evanston, IL	BTN	W 17–12	38,141
November 13	2:30 p.m.	Minnesota	No. 20	Kinnick Stadium; Iowa City, IA (rivalry)	BTN	W 27–22	69,250
November 20	1:00 p.m.	Illinois	No. 17	Kinnick Stadium; Iowa City, IA	FS1	W 33–23	64,132
November 26	12:30 p.m.	at Nebraska	No. 16	Memorial Stadium; Lincoln, NE (rivalry)	BTN	W 28–21	86,541
December 4	7:00 p.m.	vs. No. 2 Michigan*	No. 13	Lucas Oil Stadium; Indianapolis, IN (Big Ten Championship Game, Big Noon Kickoff)	FOX	L 3–42	67,183
January 1, 2022	12:00 p.m.	vs. No. 22 Kentucky*	No. 15	Camping World Stadium; Orlando, FL (Citrus Bowl)	ABC	L 17–20	50,769
*Non-conference game; ^{†}Homecoming; Rankings from AP Poll (and CFP Rankings, after November 2) - Released prior to game; All times are in Central time

== Roster ==
2021 Iowa Hawkeyes football team roster
Players
Coaches
Offense

Pos.	#	Name	Class
QB	2	Deuce Hogan	Fr
QB	5	Joey Labas	Fr
QB	8	Alex Padilla	So
QB	7	Spencer Petras	Jr
RB	34	Zach Brand	Fr
RB	15	Tyler Goodson	Jr
RB	20	Deavin Hilson	Fr
RB	21	Ivory Kelly-Martin	Sr
RB	17	Max White	Fr
RB	25	Gavin Williams	Fr
RB	4	Leshon Williams	Fr
FB	40	Turner Pallissard	Jr
FB	32	Johnny Plewa	So
FB	38	Monte Pottebaum	Jr
WR	14	Brody Brecht	Fr
WR	10	Arland Bruce IV	Fr
WR	19	Max Cooper	Sr
WR	1	Nolan Donald	So
WR	26	Jamison Heinz	Fr
WR	81	Desmond Hutson	So
WR	27	Jack Johnson	Fr
WR	6	Keagan Johnson	Fr
WR	16	Charlie Jones	Sr
WR	83	Alec Kritta	So
WR	14	Quavon Matthews	Fr
WR	89	Nico Ragaini	Jr
WR	29	Jackson Ritter	So
WR	3	Tyrone Tracy	Jr
WR	0	Diante Vines	Fr
WR	28	Isaiah Wagner	Fr
WR	18	Alec Wick	Fr
TE	88	Jackson Frericks	So
TE	46	Tommy Kujawa	Sr
TE	85	Luke Lachey	Fr
TE	84	Sam LaPorta	Jr
TE	49	Andrew Lentsch	Fr
TE/FB	42	Denin Limouris	Fr
TE	80	Josiah Miamen	So
TE	82	Johnny Pascuzzi	Fr
TE	48	Bryce Schulte	Sr
TE	87	Elijah Yelverton	Fr
OL	63	Justin Britt	So
OL	66	Jeremy Chaplin	Fr
OL	77	Connor Colby	Fr
OL	74	David Davidkov	Fr
OL	56	Nick DeJong	So
OL	67	Gennings Dunker	Fr
OL	76	Tyler Elsbury	Fr
OL	55	Luke Empen	Jr
OL	69	Tyler Endres	So
OL	54	Matt Fagan	Jr
OL	52	Asher Fahey	Fr
DL	58	Taylor Fox	So
OL	73	Cody Ince	Jr
OL	65	Tyler Linderbaum	Jr
OL	53	Michael Myslinski	Fr
OL	79	Jack Plumb	Jr
OL	78	Mason Richman	Fr
OL	64	Kyler Schott	Sr
OL	70	Beau Stephens	Fr
OL	57	Clayton Thurm	So
OL	75	Josh Volk	Fr

Defense

Pos.	#	Name	Class
DL	94	Yahya Black	Fr
DL	86	Jeff Bowie	Fr
DL	88	Isaiah Bruce	Fr
DL	45	Deontae Craig	Fr
DL	13	Joe Evans	Jr
DL	48	Ethan Hurkett (injured)	Fr
DL	95	Logan Jones	Fr
DL	85	Logan Lee	So
DL	59	Griffin Liddle	Fr
DL	48	Max Llewellyn	Fr
DL	51	Jeremiah Pittman	Fr
DL	98	Chris Reames	So
DL	99	Noah Shannon	Jr
DL	50	Louie Stec	So
DL	80	Brennan Sweeney	Fr
DL	91	Lukas Van Ness	Fr
DL	97	Zach VanValkenburg	Sr
DL	92	John Waggoner	Jr
DL	86	Jameson Witte	Fr
LB	44	Seth Benson	Jr
LB	31	Jack Campbell	Jr
LB	39	Eric Epenesa	Fr
LB	41	Jaden Harrell	Fr
LB	34	Jay Higgins	So
LB	5	Jestin Jacobs	So
LB	46	Logan Klemp	Jr
LB	32	Eli Miller	Fr
LB	43	Karson Sharar	Fr
LB	40	Josef Smith	Fr
LB	35	Justice Sullivan	Fr
LB	25	Kelby Telander	Fr
LB	36	Mike Timm	Jr
LB	42	Zach Twedt	Fr
LB	17	Wyatt Wegener	Fr
DB	4	Dane Belton	Jr
DB	7	Reggie Bracy	So
DB	29	Sebastian Castro	So
DB	15	Dallas Craddieth	Jr
DB	19	Gaven Cooke	Fr
DB	17	Brenden Deasfernandes	Fr
DB	3	Cooper DeJean	Fr
DB	37	Kyler Fisher	So
DB	8	Matt Hankins	Sr
DB	27	Jermari Harris	So
DB	21	Thomas Hartlieb	So
DB	28	Jack Koerner	Sr
DB	11	AJ Lawson	Fr
DB	13	Henry Marchese	Sr
DB	26	Kaevon Merriweather	Jr
DB	33	Riley Moss	Sr
DB	12	Jaxon Rexroth	Fr
DB	22	Terry Roberts	Jr
DB	30	Quinn Schulte	So
DB	23	Xavior Williams	Sr

Special teams

Pos.	#	Name	Class
K	96	Lucas Amaya	So
K	1	Aaron Blom	Fr
K	94	Caleb Shudak	Sr
P	2	Ryan Gersonde	Sr
P	9	Tory Taylor	So
P	45	Nick Phelps	Jr
LS	44	Luke Elkin	Fr
LS	50	Zach Kluver	So
LS	18	Austin Spiewak	Sr
LS	97	Liam Reardon	Fr

Head coach

- Kirk Ferentz

Coordinators/assistant coaches

- Brian Ferentz – Offensive Coordinator/Tight Ends
- Phil Parker – Defensive Coordinator/Secondary
- LeVar Woods – Special Teams Coordinator
- George Barnett – Offensive Line
- Kelvin Bell – Defensive Line
- Ladell Betts – Running Backs
- Kelton Copeland – Wide Receivers
- Jay Niemann – Assistant Defensive Line/Defensive Recruiting Coordinator
- Ken O'Keefe – Quarterbacks
- Seth Wallace – Assistant Defensive Coordinator/Linebackers
- Raimond Braithwaite – Director, Strength and Conditioning
- Kohle Helle – Assistant, Strength and Conditioning
- Drew Heitland – Assistant, Strength and Conditioning
- Ben Morse – Assistant, Strength and Conditioning
- Cody Myers – Assistant, Strength and Conditioning
- John Engelbrecht – Nutrition & Performance Analytics
- Paul Federici – Director, Football Operations
- Ben Hansen – Assistant Director, Football Operations
- Jason Manson – Director of Player Development
- Sam Brincks – Interim Director, Player Development
- Scott Southmayd – Director, Player Personnel
- Tyler Barnes – Director, Recruiting
- Krisanne Ryther – Recruiting Operations and Special Events Coordinator
- Caleb Saunders – Director, Football Creative Media
- Justin Elsner – Football Graphic Designer
- Eric Copeland – Graduate Assistant
- Adam Cox – Graduate Assistant
- Justin Flood – Graduate Assistant
- Austin Showalter – Director, Football Analytics
- Shane Viilo – Football Analyst
- Tyler Parker – Football Analyst
- Bob Rahfeldt – Director, Football Video Operations

Legend

- (C) Team captain
- (S) Suspended
- (I) Ineligible
- Injured
- Redshirt

Roster
Last update: 10/12/21

== Rankings ==
Ranking movements Legend: ██ Increase in ranking ██ Decrease in ranking ( ) = First-place votes
	Week															
Poll	Pre	1	2	3	4	5	6	7	8	9	10	11	12	13	14	Final
AP	18	10	5	5	5	3	2	11	9	19	19	18	17	15	17	23
Coaches	18	12	7	6	5	3	2 (1)	11	10	16	14	14	12	12	16	23
CFP	Not released									22	20	17	16	13	15	Not released

== Game summaries ==
=== No. 17 Indiana ===
Indiana at Iowa

Team	1	2	3	4	Total
No. 17 Hoosiers	3	0	3	0	6
• No. 18 Hawkeyes	14	17	0	3	34

- Date: September 4
- Location:
  Kinnick Stadium
  Iowa City, IA
- Game start: 2:40 p.m. CDT
- Elapsed time: 3:14
- Game attendance: 68,166
- Game weather: 72 °F (22 °C), Cloudy, Wind NW 10 mph (16 km/h)
- Referee: Larry Smith
- TV announcers (BTN): Brandon Gaudin (play-by-play), James Laurinaitis (analyst) & Rick Pizzo (sideline)
- Source: Box Score

Scoring summary
1	13:35	Iowa	Tyler Goodson 56-yard run (Caleb Shudak kick)	Iowa 7–0
1	12:45	Iowa	Riley Moss 30-yard interception return (Caleb Shudak kick)	Iowa 14–0
1	4:28	Indiana	Charles Campbell 36-yard field goal	Iowa 14–3
2	11:54	Iowa	Spencer Petras 9-yard run (Caleb Shudak kick)	Iowa 21–3
2	1:41	Iowa	Riley Moss 55-yard interception return (Caleb Shudak kick)	Iowa 28–3
2	0:00	Iowa	Caleb Shudak 41-yard field goal	Iowa 31–3
3	8:39	Indiana	Charles Campbell 41-yard field goal	Iowa 31–6
4	9:52	Iowa	Caleb Shudak 35-yard field goal	Iowa 34–6

Iowa jumped out to an early lead and never looked back. The Hawkeyes defense came out in full force, getting three interceptions – including two pick sixes by senior Riley Moss – and kept Indiana out of the end zone. Equally impressive for an opening game, Iowa limited itself to a mere two penalties.

Statistics	IU	IOWA
First downs	11	18
Total yards	233	303
Rushing yards	77	158
Passing yards	156	145
Turnovers	3	2
Time of possession	32:04	27:56

Team	Category	Player	Statistics
Indiana	Passing	Michael Penix Jr.	14/31, 156 yards, 3 INT
Indiana	Rushing	Stephen Carr	19 carries, 57 yards
Indiana	Receiving	Ty Fryfogle	5 receptions, 84 yards
Iowa	Passing	Spencer Petras	13/27, 145 yards
Iowa	Rushing	Tyler Goodson	19 carries, 99 yards, TD
Iowa	Receiving	Sam LaPorta	5 receptions, 83 yards

=== At No. 9 Iowa State ===
Iowa at Iowa State
Cy-Hawk Trophy

Team	1	2	3	4	Total
• No. 10 Hawkeyes	0	14	10	3	27
No. 9 Cyclones	3	7	0	7	17

- Date: September 11
- Location:
  Jack Trice Stadium
  Ames, IA
- Game start: 3:37 p.m. CDT
- Elapsed time: 3:25
- Game attendance: 61,500
- Game weather: 91 °F (33 °C), Sunny, Wind S 10 mph (16 km/h)
- Referee: John O'Neill
- TV announcers (ABC): Rece Davis (play-by-play), Kirk Herbstreit (analyst) & Holly Rowe (sideline)
- Source: Box Score

Scoring summary
1	0:39	ISU	Connor Assalley 23-yard field goal	ISU 3–0
2	8:13	Iowa	Tyler Goodson 4-yard run (Caleb Shudak kick)	Iowa 7–3
2	1:01	Iowa	Charlie Jones 26-yard pass from Spencer Petras (Caleb Shudak kick)	Iowa 14–3
2	0:07	ISU	Breece Hall 4-yard run (Connor Assalley kick)	Iowa 14–10
3	5:08	Iowa	Jack Campbell 6-yard fumble return (Caleb Shudak kick)	Iowa 21–10
3	2:56	Iowa	Caleb Shudak 51-yard field goal	Iowa 24–10
4	12:53	Iowa	Caleb Shudak 22-yard field goal	Iowa 27–10
4	3:27	ISU	Tarique Milton 13-yard pass from Hunter Dekkers (Connor Assalley kick)	Iowa 27–17

This season's Cy-Hawk matchup was a showdown of top 10 teams in the AP poll, making this the first time the schools have faced off as ranked opponents. ESPN's College GameDay was on hand for the second straight time in the series as the annual contest was cancelled the previous year due to COVID-19. Iowa extended its win streak in the series to six games, and has now won five consecutive games against ranked opponents – its longest such streak since 1960.

Statistics	IOWA	IOWA ST
First downs	11	21
Total yards	173	339
Rushing yards	67	87
Passing yards	106	252
Turnovers	0	4
Time of possession	31:38	28:22

Team	Category	Player	Statistics
Iowa	Passing	Spencer Petras	11/21, 106 yards, TD
Iowa	Rushing	Tyler Goodson	21 carries, 55 yards, TD
Iowa	Receiving	Charle Jones	2 receptions, 36 yards, TD
Iowa State	Passing	Brock Purdy	13/27, 138 yards, 3 INT
Iowa State	Rushing	Breece Hall	16 carries, 69 yards, TD
Iowa State	Receiving	Charlie Kolar	4 receptions, 34 yards

=== Kent State ===
Kent State at Iowa

Team	1	2	3	4	Total
Golden Flashes	7	0	0	0	7
• No. 5 Hawkeyes	9	7	7	7	30

- Date: September 18
- Location:
  Kinnick Stadium
  Iowa City, IA
- Game start: 2:40 p.m. CDT
- Elapsed time: 3:04
- Game attendance: 61,932
- Game weather: 82 °F (28 °C), Sunny, Wind SE 4 mph (6.4 km/h)
- Referee: Larry Smith
- TV announcers (BTN): Mark Followill (play-by-play), Anthony Herron (analyst) & Coley Harvey (sideline)
- Source: Box Score

Scoring summary
1	8:03	Iowa	Safety, Dustin Crum sacked by Lukas Van Ness in end zone	Iowa 2–0
1	6:34	Iowa	Tyler Goodson 46-yard run (Caleb Shudak kick)	Iowa 9–0
1	5:00	Kent	Keshunn Abram 23-yard pass from Dustin Crum (A. Glass kick)	Iowa 9–7
2	0:19	Iowa	Sam LaPorta 5-yard pass from Spencer Petras (Caleb Shudak kick)	Iowa 16–7
3	0:32	Iowa	Tyler Goodson 35-yard run (Caleb Shudak kick) (Caleb Shudak kick)	Iowa 23–7
4	4:07	Iowa	Tyler Goodson 2-yard run (Caleb Shudak kick) (Caleb Shudak kick)	Iowa 30–7

The Hawkeyes, playing as an AP top 5 team at home for the first time since 1985, won for the 300th time at Kinnick Stadium since its opening in 1929. Tyler Goodson had his best game to date, rushing for 153 yards. This was the first meeting of the programs since 2004.

Statistics	KENT	IOWA
First downs	17	21
Total yards	264	418
Rushing yards	79	206
Passing yards	185	212
Turnovers	1	1
Time of possession	23:22	36:38

Team	Category	Player	Statistics
Kent State	Passing	Dustin Crum	16/23, 185 yards, TD
Kent State	Rushing	Marquez Cooper	10 carries, 38 yards
Kent State	Receiving	Keshunn Abram	6 receptions, 138 yards, TD
Iowa	Passing	Spencer Petras	25/36, 209 yards, TD
Iowa	Rushing	Tyler Goodson	22 carries, 153 yards, 3 TD
Iowa	Receiving	Sam LaPorta	7 receptions, 65 yards, TD

=== Colorado State ===
Colorado State at Iowa

Team	1	2	3	4	Total
Rams	0	14	0	0	14
• No. 5 Hawkeyes	0	7	14	3	24

- Date: September 25
- Location:
  Kinnick Stadium
  Iowa City, IA
- Game start: 2:41 p.m. CDT
- Elapsed time: 3:13
- Game attendance: 65,456
- Game weather: 71 °F (22 °C), Sunny, Wind W 15 mph (24 km/h)
- Referee: Mark Kluczynski
- TV announcers (FS1): Tim Brando (play-by-play) and Spencer Tillman (analyst)
- Source: Box Score

Scoring summary
2	13:45	Iowa	Keagan Johnson 43-yard pass from Spencer Petras (Caleb Shudak kick)	Iowa 7–0
2	3:55	CSU	Todd Centeio 10-yard run (Cayden Camper kick)	Tied 7–7
2	0:24	CSU	Gavin Williams 3-yard pass from Todd Centeio (Cayden Camper kick)	CSU 14–7
3	8:17	Iowa	Tyrone Tracy Jr. 6-yard run (Caleb Shudak kick)	Tied 14–14
3	6:01	Iowa	Sam LaPorta 27-yard pass from Spencer Petras (Caleb Shudak kick)	Iowa 21–14
4	12:32	Iowa	Caleb Shudak 45-yard field goal	Iowa 24–14

This was the first meeting between the two schools. After a sluggish start, the Hawkeyes shut out Colorado State in the second half to extend its streak of holding opponents under 25 points.

Statistics	CSU	IOWA
First downs	12	12
Total yards	250	278
Rushing yards	95	54
Passing yards	155	224
Turnovers	1	1
Time of possession	31:20	28:40

Team	Category	Player	Statistics
Colorado State	Passing	Todd Centeio	16/30, 155 yards, TD
Colorado State	Rushing	A'Jon Vivens	17 carries, 45 yards
Colorado State	Receiving	Trey McBride	6 receptions, 59 yards
Iowa	Passing	Spencer Petras	15/23, 224 yards, 2 TD, INT
Iowa	Rushing	Tyler Goodson	18 carries, 57 yards
Iowa	Receiving	Sam LaPorta	4 receptions, 45 yards, TD

=== At Maryland ===
Iowa at Maryland

Team	1	2	3	4	Total
• No. 5 Hawkeyes	3	31	10	7	51
Terrapins	7	0	7	0	14

- Date: October 1
- Location:
  Maryland Stadium
  College Park, MD
- Game start: 8:04 p.m. EDT
- Elapsed time: 3:37
- Game attendance: 45,527
- Game weather: 60 °F (16 °C), Cloudy, Wind N 0 mph (0 km/h)
- Referee: Jerry McGinn
- TV announcers (FS1): Tim Brando (play-by-play) and Spencer Tillman (analyst)
- Source: Box Score

Scoring summary
1	7:16	Iowa	Caleb Shudak 41-yard field goal	Iowa 3–0
1	3:37	Maryland	Chig Okonkwo 9-yard pass from Taulia Tagovailoa (Joseph Petrino kick)	Maryland 7–3
2	14:57	Iowa	Spencer Petras 1-yard run (Caleb Shudak kick)	Iowa 10–7
2	14:04	Iowa	Arland Bruce IV 8-yard pass from Spencer Petras (Caleb Shudak kick)	Iowa 17–7
2	10:53	Iowa	Spencer Petras 1-yard run (Caleb Shudak kick)	Iowa 24–7
2	5:46	Iowa	Monte Pottebaum 2-yard run (Caleb Shudak kick)	Iowa 31–7
2	0:29	Iowa	Caleb Shudak 38-yard field goal	Iowa 34–7
3	12:49	Iowa	Tyler Goodson 67-yard pass from Spencer Petras (Caleb Shudak kick)	Iowa 41–7
3	8:35	Iowa	Caleb Shudak 32-yard field goal	Iowa 44–7
3	6:01	Maryland	Rakim Jarrett 7-yard pass from Taulia Tagovailoa (Joseph Petrino kick)	Iowa 44–14
4	14:18	Iowa	Tyrone Tracy Jr. 7-yard pass from Spencer Petras (Caleb Shudak kick)	Iowa 51–14

In the first match-up of the teams since 2018, Iowa tied the school record with six interceptions in this lopsided road win. It was the first 5–0 start for the program since 2015. The Hawkeyes also scored their most points in a quarter since 2002.

Statistics	IOWA	UMD
First downs	24	14
Total yards	428	271
Rushing yards	145	97
Passing yards	283	174
Turnovers	0	7
Time of possession	39:00	21:00

Team	Category	Player	Statistics
Iowa	Passing	Spencer Petras	21/30, 259 yards, 3 TD
Iowa	Rushing	Tyler Goodson	19 carries, 66 yards
Iowa	Receiving	Arland Bruce IV	6 receptions, 43 yards, TD
Maryland	Passing	Taulia Tagovailoa	16/29, 157 yards, 2 TD, 5 INT
Maryland	Rushing	Taulia Tagovailoa	4 carries, 24 yards
Maryland	Receiving	Dontay Demus Jr.	4 receptions, 61 yards

=== No. 4 Penn State ===
Penn State at Iowa

Team	1	2	3	4	Total
No. 4 Nittany Lions	14	3	3	0	20
• No. 3 Hawkeyes	3	7	3	10	23

- Date: October 9
- Location:
  Kinnick Stadium
  Iowa City, IA
- Game start: 3:05 p.m. CDT
- Elapsed time: 3:39
- Game attendance: 69,250
- Game weather: 82 °F (28 °C), Cloudy, Wind SE 12 mph (19 km/h)
- Referee: John O'Neill
- TV announcers (FOX): Gus Johnson (play-by-play), Joel Klatt (analyst) and Jenny Taft (sideline)
- Source: Box Score

Scoring summary
1	11:08	Iowa	Caleb Shudak 34-yard field goal	Iowa 3–0
1	8:37	Penn State	Noah Cain 2-yard rush (Jordan Stout kick)	Penn State 7–3
1	3:21	Penn State	Sean Clifford 4-yard rush (Jordan Stout kick)	Penn State 14–3
2	12:31	Penn State	Jordan Stout 32-yard field goal	Penn State 17–3
2	7:08	Iowa	Charlie Jones 9-yard pass from Spencer Petras (Caleb Shudak kick)	Penn State 17–10
3	12:31	Penn State	Jordan Stout 32-yard field goal	Penn State 20–10
3	1:36	Iowa	Caleb Shudak 48-yard field goal	Penn State 20–13
4	8:08	Iowa	Caleb Shudak 36-yard field goal	Penn State 20–16
4	6:26	Iowa	Nico Ragaini 44-yard pass from Spencer Petras (Caleb Shudak kick)	Iowa 23–20

Iowa was seeking its first home win over Penn State since 2010 with Fox's Big Noon Kickoff on hand. This match-up of top five teams in the AP poll was the first such game at Kinnick Stadium since No. 2 Michigan visited the No. 1 Hawkeyes in 1985. Iowa fell behind 17–3 to PSU, but after an injury to Nittany Lions quarterback Sean Clifford, the Hawkeyes slowly clawed back, outscoring Penn State 20–3 the rest of the way to earn the 23–20 win. With this victory, Iowa improved to 6–0, became bowl eligible, extended their overall win streak to 12 games, and ascended to No. 2 in both major polls the following day.

Statistics	PSU	IOWA
First downs	18	18
Total yards	287	305
Rushing yards	107	110
Passing yards	180	195
Turnovers	4	1
Time of possession	24:07	35:53

Team	Category	Player	Statistics
Penn State	Passing	Sean Clifford	15/25, 146 yards, 2 INT
Penn State	Rushing	Sean Clifford	3 carries, 36 yards, TD
Penn State	Receiving	Jahan Dotson	8 receptions, 48 yards
Iowa	Passing	Spencer Petras	17/31, 195 yards, 2 TD, INT
Iowa	Rushing	Tyler Goodson	25 carries, 88 yards
Iowa	Receiving	Nico Ragaini	4 receptions, 73 yards, TD

=== Purdue ===
Purdue at Iowa

Team	1	2	3	4	Total
• Boilermakers	7	7	3	7	24
No. 2 Hawkeyes	0	7	0	0	7

- Date: October 16
- Location:
  Kinnick Stadium
  Iowa City, IA
- Game start: 2:37 p.m. CDT
- Elapsed time: 3:40
- Game attendance: 69,250
- Game weather: 61 °F (16 °C), Sunny, Wind W 16 mph (26 km/h)
- Referee: Jeffrey Servinski
- TV announcers (ABC): Dave Pasch (play-by-play), Dusty Dvoracek (analyst) and Tom Luginbill (sideline)
- Source: Box Score

Scoring summary
1	3:38	Purdue	Aidan O'Connell 6-yard run (Mitchell Fineran kick)	Purdue 7–0
2	3:20	Iowa	Ivory Kelly-Martin 3-yard run (Caleb Shudak kick)	Tied 7–7
2	0:19	Purdue	T. J. Sheffield 3-yard pass from Aidan O'Connell (Mitchell Fineran kick)	Purdue 14–7
3	11:07	Purdue	Mitchell Fineran 31-yard field goal	Purdue 17–7
4	12:29	Purdue	David Bell 21-yard pass from Aiden O'Connell (Mitchell Fineran kick)	Purdue 24–7

The unranked Boilermakers dominated this matchup with the Hawkeyes, and won for the fourth time in the last five meetings with Iowa.

Statistics	PUR	IOWA
First downs	24	17
Total yards	464	271
Rushing yards	86	76
Passing yards	378	195
Turnovers	1	4
Time of possession	34:46	25:14

Team	Category	Player	Statistics
Purdue	Passing	Aidan O'Connell	30/40, 375 yards, 2 TD
Purdue	Rushing	King Doerue	18 carries, 48 yards
Purdue	Receiving	David Bell	11 receptions, 240 yards, TD
Iowa	Passing	Spencer Petras	17/32, 195 yards, 4 INT
Iowa	Rushing	Tyler Goodson	12 carries, 68 yards
Iowa	Receiving	Sam LaPorta	5 receptions, 61 yards

=== At Wisconsin ===
Iowa at Wisconsin
Heartland Trophy

Team	1	2	3	4	Total
No. 9 Hawkeyes	0	0	7	0	7
• Badgers	7	13	0	7	27

- Date: October 30
- Location:
  Camp Randall Stadium
  Madison, WI
- Game start: 11:02 a.m. CDT
- Elapsed time: 3:24
- Game attendance: 74,209
- Game weather: 51 °F (11 °C), Cloudy, Wind N 10 mph (16 km/h)
- Referee: Michael Cannon
- TV announcers (ESPN): Bob Wischusen (play-by-play), Dan Orlovsky (analyst), and Kris Budden (sideline)
- Source: Box Score

Scoring summary
1	3:08	Wisc	Jake Ferguson 4-yard pass from Graham Mertz (Collin Larsh kick)	Wisconsin 7–0
2	12:18	Wisc	Collin Larsh 29-yard field goal	Wisconsin 10–0
2	7:40	Wisc	Graham Mertz 1-yard run (Collin Larsh kick)	Wisconsin 17–0
2	2:51	Wisc	Collin Larsh 32-yard field goal	Wisconsin 20–0
3	8:21	Iowa	Spencer Petras 1-yard run (Caleb Shudak kick)	Wisconsin 20–7
4	12:54	Wisc	Graham Mertz 1-yard run (Collin Larsh kick)	Wisconsin 27–7

The unranked Badgers dominated this matchup with the Hawkeyes, and became the first Iowa opponent to score more than 24 points since the 2018 regular season finale.

Statistics	IOWA	WIS
First downs	9	16
Total yards	156	270
Rushing yards	24	166
Passing yards	132	104
Turnovers	3	0
Time of possession	24:13	35:47

Team	Category	Player	Statistics
Iowa	Passing	Spencer Petras	9/19, 93 yards
Iowa	Rushing	Tyler Goodson	13 carries, 27 yards
Iowa	Receiving	Sam LaPorta	3 receptions, 44 yards
Wisconsin	Passing	Graham Mertz	11/22, 104 yards, TD
Wisconsin	Rushing	Braelon Allen	20 carries, 104 yards
Wisconsin	Receiving	Danny Davis III	5 receptions, 59 yards, TD

=== At Northwestern ===
Iowa at Northwestern

Team	1	2	3	4	Total
• No. 22 Hawkeyes	7	7	3	0	17
Wildcats	0	3	3	6	12

- Date: November 6
- Location:
  Ryan Field
  Evanston, IL
- Game start: 6:10 p.m. CDT
- Elapsed time: 3:29
- Game attendance: 38,141
- Game weather: 65 °F (18 °C), Sunny, Wind S 14 mph (23 km/h)
- Referee: Ron Snodgrass
- TV announcers (BTN): Cory Provus (play-by-play), Matt Millen (analyst) and Elise Menaker (sideline)
- Source: Box Score

Scoring summary
1	0:22	Iowa	Tyler Goodson 13-yard run (Caleb Shudak kick)	Iowa 7–0
2	10:41	Iowa	Arland Bruce IV 10-yard run (Caleb Shudak kick)	Iowa 14–0
2	2:11	NW	Charlie Kuhbander 22-yard field goal	Iowa 14–3
3	10:41	Iowa	Caleb Shudak 25-yard field goal	Iowa 17–3
3	1:58	NW	Charlie Kuhbander 30-yard field goal	Iowa 17–6
4	2:21	NW	Evan Hull 31-yard pass from Andrew Marty (pass failed)	Iowa 17–12

Backup quarterback Alex Padilla led two first-half touchdown drives, and the Iowa defense forced three interceptions as the Hawkeyes snapped a two-game skid.

Statistics	IOWA	NW
First downs	19	20
Total yards	361	363
Rushing yards	185	93
Passing yards	176	270
Turnovers	0	3
Time of possession	31:05	28:55

Team	Category	Player	Statistics
Iowa	Passing	Alex Padilla	18/28, 172 yards
Iowa	Rushing	Tyler Goodson	21 carries, 141 yards, TD
Iowa	Receiving	Keagan Johnson	5 receptions, 68 yards
Northwestern	Passing	Andrew Marty	25/44, 270 yards, TD, 3 INT
Northwestern	Rushing	Evan Hull	11 carries, 41 yards
Northwestern	Receiving	Evan Hull	6 receptions, 89 yards, TD

=== Minnesota ===
Minnesota at Iowa
Floyd of Rosedale

Team	1	2	3	4	Total
Golden Gophers	3	10	3	6	22
• No. 20 Hawkeyes	3	7	7	10	27

- Date: November 13
- Location:
  Kinnick Stadium
  Iowa City, IA
- Game start: 2:42 p.m. CST
- Elapsed time: 3:26
- Game attendance: 69,250
- Game weather: 37 °F (3 °C), Cloudy, Wind W 12 mph (19 km/h)
- Referee: Jerry McGinn
- TV announcers (BTN): Brandon Gaudin (play-by-play), James Laurinaitis (analyst) & Rick Pizzo (sideline)
- Source: Box Score

Scoring summary
1	9:49	Iowa	Caleb Shudak 50-yard field goal	Iowa 3–0
1	2:07	Minnesota	Matthew Trickett 20-yard field goal	Tied 3–3
2	13:32	Iowa	Alex Padilla 1-yard run (Caleb Shudak kick)	Iowa 10–3
2	5:27	Minnesota	Ko Kieft 37-yard pass from Cole Kramer (Matthew Trickett kick)	Tied 10–10
2	0:00	Minnesota	Matthew Trickett 31-yard field goal	Minnesota 13–10
3	11:51	Iowa	Charlie Jones 72-yard pass from Alex Padilla (Caleb Shudak kick)	Iowa 17–13
3	6:14	Minnesota	Matthew Trickett 29-yard field goal	Iowa 17–16
4	12:49	Iowa	Keagan Johnson 27-yard pass from Alex Padilla (Caleb Shudak kick)	Iowa 24–16
4	5:28	Minnesota	Chris Autman-Bell 68-yard pass from Tanner Morgan (pass failed)	Iowa 24–22
4	0:41	Iowa	Caleb Shudak 29-yard field goal	Iowa 27–22

In Alex Padilla's first start at quarterback, Iowa won for the seventh straight time in this trophy series. Padilla threw for two touchdowns and ran for another in the victory. The Golden Gophers haven't won at Kinnick Stadium since 1999.

Statistics	MIN	IOWA
First downs	23	12
Total yards	409	277
Rushing yards	189	71
Passing yards	220	206
Turnovers	0	1
Time of possession	40:02	19:40

Team	Category	Player	Statistics
Minnesota	Passing	Tanner Morgan	14/30, 183 yards, TD
Minnesota	Rushing	Ky Thomas	29 carries, 126 yards
Minnesota	Receiving	Chris Autman-Bell	5 receptions, 109 yards, TD
Iowa	Passing	Alex Padilla	11/24, 206 yards, 2 TD
Iowa	Rushing	Tyler Goodson	18 carries, 59 yards
Iowa	Receiving	Charlie Jones	2 receptions, 106 yards, TD

=== Illinois ===
Illinois at Iowa

Team	1	2	3	4	Total
Fighting Illini	10	3	3	7	23
• No. 17 Hawkeyes	7	10	3	13	33

- Date: November 20
- Location:
  Kinnick Stadium
  Iowa City, IA
- Game start: 1:10 p.m. CST
- Elapsed time: 3:31
- Game attendance: 64,132
- Referee: Larry Smith
- TV announcers (FS1): Adam Alexander (play-by-play) and Devin Gardner (analyst)
- Source: Box Score

Scoring summary
1	8:37	Illinois	Luke Ford 13-yard pass from Brandon Peters (James McCourt kick)	Illinois 7–0
1	3:20	Illinois	James McCourt 46-yard field goal	Illinois 10–0
1	3:05	Iowa	Charlie Jones 100-yard kickoff return (Caleb Shudak kick)	Illinois 10–7
2	14:08	Iowa	Arland Bruce IV 2-yard run (Caleb Shudak kick)	Iowa 14–10
2	6:41	Iowa	Caleb Shudak 51-yard field goal	Iowa 17–10
2	3:13	Illinois	James McCourt 45-yard field goal	Iowa 17–13
3	9:12	Iowa	Caleb Shudak 48-yard field goal	Iowa 20–13
3	2:46	Illinois	James McCourt 53-yard field goal	Iowa 20–16
4	9:12	Iowa	Caleb Shudak 48-yard field goal	Iowa 23–16
4	9:12	Iowa	Caleb Shudak 48-yard field goal	Iowa 26–16
4	1:36	Iowa	Jack Campbell 32-yard interception return (Caleb Shudak kick)	Iowa 33–16
4	0:31	Iowa	Isaiah Williams 16-yard pass from Brandon Peters (James McCourt kick)	Iowa 33–23

Iowa won for the eighth straight time in the series. Illinois hasn't won at Kinnick Stadium since 1999.

Statistics	ILL	IOWA
First downs	11	18
Total yards	312	255
Rushing yards	64	172
Passing yards	248	83
Turnovers	2	1
Time of possession	25:42	34:18

Team	Category	Player	Statistics
Illinois	Passing	Brandon Peters	16/36, 248 yards, 2 TD, 2 INT
Illinois	Rushing	Chase Brown	13 carries, 42 yards
Illinois	Receiving	Casey Washington	3 receptions, 61 yards
Iowa	Passing	Alex Padilla	6/17, 83 yards, INT
Iowa	Rushing	Tyler Goodson	27 carries, 132 yards
Iowa	Receiving	Arland Bruce IV	2 receptions, 45 yards

=== At Nebraska ===
Iowa at Nebraska
Heroes Trophy

Team	1	2	3	4	Total
• No. 16 Hawkeyes	0	6	3	19	28
Cornhuskers	7	7	7	0	21

- Date: November 26
- Location:
  Memorial Stadium
  Lincoln, NE
- Game start: 12:31 p.m. CST
- Elapsed time: 3:16
- Game attendance: 86,541
- Game weather: 52 °F (11 °C), Sunny, Wind SW 6 mph (9.7 km/h)
- Referee: Mark Kluczynski
- TV announcers (BTN): Brandon Gaudin (play-by-play), James Laurinaitis (analyst) & Rick Pizzo (sideline)
- Source: Box Score

Scoring summary
1	9:18	Neb	Logan Smothers 2-yard run (Chase Contreraz kick)	Neb 7–0
2	10:39	Iowa	Caleb Shudak 51-yard field goal	Neb 7–3
2	4:20	Neb	Jaquez Yant 1-yard run (Chase Contreraz kick)	Neb 14–3
2	0:39	Iowa	Caleb Shudak 39-yard field goal	Neb 14–6
3	5:54	Neb	Logan Smothers 1-yard run (Chase Contreraz kick)	Neb 21–6
3	0:27	Iowa	Caleb Shudak 36-yard field goal	Neb 21–9
4	14:16	Iowa	Kyler Fisher 14-yard blocked punt return (Caleb Shudak kick)	Neb 21–16
4	9:56	Iowa	Safety	Neb 21–18
4	7:21	Iowa	Caleb Shudak 44-yard field goal	Tied 21–21
4	2:58	Iowa	Spencer Petras 2-yard run (Caleb Shudak kick)	Iowa 28–21

After facing a 21–6 third quarter deficit, the Hawkeyes rallied to earn a win over the Cornhuskers as they outscored the home team 22–0 to end the game. It was Iowa's fifth straight victory in Lincoln and seventh straight victory overall in this trophy series.

Statistics	IOWA	NEB
First downs	19	18
Total yards	364	327
Rushing yards	186	129
Passing yards	178	198
Turnovers	1	2
Time of possession	31:53	28:07

Team	Category	Player	Statistics
Iowa	Passing	Spencer Petras	7/13, 102 yards
Iowa	Rushing	Tyler Goodson	23 carries, 156 yards
Iowa	Receiving	Sam LaPorta	3 receptions, 61 yards
Nebraska	Passing	Logan Smothers	16/22, 198 yards, INT
Nebraska	Rushing	Logan Smothers	24 carries, 64 yards, 2 TD
Nebraska	Receiving	Samori Toure	6 receptions, 67 yards

=== Vs. No. 2 Michigan (Big Ten Championship game) ===
Michigan vs Iowa
Big Ten Championship Game

Team	1	2	3	4	Total
• No. 2 Wolverines	14	0	7	21	42
No. 13 Hawkeyes	3	0	0	0	3

- Date: December 4, 2021
- Location:
  Lucas Oil Stadium
  Indianapolis, IN
- Game start: 8:19 p.m. EST
- Elapsed time: 3:23
- Game attendance: 67,183
- Game weather: None (retractable roof closed)
- Referee: Mike Cannon
- TV announcers (FOX): Gus Johnson (play-by-play), Joel Klatt (analyst) & Jenny Taft (sideline)
- Source: Box Score

Scoring summary
1	6:38	Mich	Blake Corum 67-yard run (Jake Moody kick)	Michigan 7–0
1	5:27	Mich	Roman Wilson 75-yard pass from Donovan Edwards (Jake Moody kick)	Michigan 14–0
1	1:26	Iowa	Caleb Shudak 22-yard field goal	Michigan 14–3
3	8:23	Mich	Hassan Haskins 4-yard run (Jake Moody kick)	Michigan 21–3
4	11:16	Mich	Hassan Haskins 1-yard run (Jake Moody kick)	Michigan 28–3
4	5:24	Mich	Erick All 5-yard pass from Cade McNamara (Jake Moody kick)	Michigan 35–3
4	1:25	Mich	Donovan Edwards 1-yard run (Jake Moody kick)	Michigan 42–3

This game marked Iowa's second appearance in the Big Ten Championship Game (2015). Ferentz is now 1–2 against Michigan in the Harbaugh era.

Statistics	MICH	IOWA
First downs	21	15
Total yards	461	279
Rushing yards	211	104
Passing yards	250	175
Turnovers	2	1
Time of possession	28:21	31:39

Team	Category	Player	Statistics
Michigan	Passing	Cade McNamara	16/24, 169 yards, TD, INT
Michigan	Rushing	Blake Corum	5 carries, 74 yards, TD
Michigan	Receiving	Roman Wilson	2 receptions, 82 yards, TD
Iowa	Passing	Spencer Petras	9/22, 137 yards
Iowa	Rushing	Gavin Williams	12 carries, 56 yards
Iowa	Receiving	Sam LaPorta	6 receptions, 62 yards

=== Vs. No. 22 Kentucky (Citrus Bowl) ===
Iowa vs Kentucky
Citrus Bowl

Team	1	2	3	4	Total
No. 15 Hawkeyes	0	3	7	7	17
• No. 22 Wildcats	7	6	0	7	20

- Date: January 1, 2022
- Location:
  Camping World Stadium
  Orlando, FL
- Game start: 1:06 p.m. EST
- Elapsed time: 3:17
- Game attendance: 50,769
- Game weather: 82 °F (28 °C), Sunny, Wind S 11 mph (18 km/h)
- Referee: Jeff Heaser (ACC)
- TV announcers (ABC): Dave Pasch (play-by-play), Dusty Dvoracek (analyst), Tom Luginbill (sideline)
- Source: Box Score

Scoring summary
1	5:32	UK	Chris Rodriguez Jr. 5-yard pass from Will Levis (Matt Ruffolo kick)	Kentucky 7–0
2	11:03	Iowa	Caleb Shudak 28-yard field goal	Kentucky 7–3
2	2:48	UK	Matt Ruffolo 21-yard field goal	Kentucky 10–3
2	0:38	UK	Matt Ruffolo 27-yard field goal	Kentucky 13–3
3	3:21	Iowa	Arland Bruce IV 20-yard run (Caleb Shudak kick)	Kentucky 13–10
4	10:54	Iowa	Sam LaPorta 36-yard pass from Spencer Petras (Caleb Shudak kick)	Iowa 17–13
4	1:48	UK	Chris Rodriguez Jr. 6-yard run (Matt Ruffolo kick)	Kentucky 20–17

The Wildcats and Hawkeyes faced off for the first time, and Iowa returned to the Citrus Bowl for the first time since the 2005 Capital One Bowl. The loss kept the Hawkeyes from winning four consecutive bowl games for the first time in program history.

Statistics	IOWA	UK
First downs	20	24
Total yards	384	354
Rushing yards	173	121
Passing yards	211	233
Turnovers	3	1
Time of possession	22:06	37:54

Team	Category	Player	Statistics
Iowa	Passing	Spencer Petras	19/30, 211 yards, TD, 3 INT
Iowa	Rushing	Gavin Williams	16 carries, 98 yards
Iowa	Receiving	Sam LaPorta	7 receptions, 122 yards, TD
Kentucky	Passing	Will Levis	17/28, 233 yards, TD, INT
Kentucky	Rushing	Chris Rodriguez Jr.	20 carries, 107 yards, TD
Kentucky	Receiving	Wan'Dale Robinson	10 receptions, 170 yards

== Awards and honors ==
Individual Awards
Player	Award	Ref.
Charlie Jones	Rodgers–Dwight Return Specialist of the Year	
Tyler Linderbaum	Rimington Trophy; Rimington–Pace Offensive Lineman of the Year	
Riley Moss	Tatum–Woodson Defensive Back of the Year	

== Players drafted into the NFL ==
Round	Pick	Player	Position	NFL Club
1	25	Tyler Linderbaum	C	Baltimore Ravens
4	114	Dane Belton	S	New York Giants
