= 2021 Big Ten Football Championship Game =

- Conference Championship
Michigan Wolverines	Iowa Hawkeyes
(11–1)	(10–2)
42	3
Head coach: Jim Harbaugh	Head coach: Kirk Ferentz
AP / Coaches / CFP; 2 / 3 / 2	AP / Coaches / CFP; 15 / 12 / 13
	1	2	3	4	Total
Michigan	14	0	7	21	42
Iowa	3	0	0	0	3
- Date: December 4, 2021
- Season: 2021
- Stadium: Lucas Oil Stadium
- Location: Indianapolis, Indiana
- MVP: Aidan Hutchinson, DE, Michigan
- Favorite: Michigan by 11
- National anthem: Hawkeye Marching Band & Michigan Marching Band
- Referee: Mike Cannon
- Halftime show: Hawkeye Marching Band & Michigan Marching Band
- Attendance: 67,183

United States TV coverage
- Network: Fox
- Announcers: Gus Johnson (play-by-play), Joel Klatt (analyst) and Jenny Taft (sideline)

2021 Big Ten Conference football standings
	Conf.			Overall
Team	W		L	W		L
East Division
No. 3 Michigan xy$^	8	–	1	12	–	2
No. 6 Ohio State x	8	–	1	11	–	2
No. 9 Michigan State	7	–	2	11	–	2
Penn State	4	–	5	7	–	6
Maryland	3	–	6	7	–	6
Rutgers	2	–	7	5	–	8
Indiana	0	–	9	2	–	10
West Division
No. 23 Iowa xy	7	–	2	10	–	4
Minnesota	6	–	3	9	–	4
Wisconsin	6	–	3	9	–	4
Purdue	6	–	3	9	–	4
Illinois	4	–	5	5	–	7
Nebraska	1	–	8	3	–	9
Northwestern	1	–	8	3	–	9
Championship: Michigan 42, Iowa 3
^ – College Football Playoff participant; $ – Conference champion; x – Division champion/co-champions; y – Championship game participant; Rankings from AP Poll

The 2021 Big Ten Football Championship Game was a college football game played on December 4, 2021, at Lucas Oil Stadium in Indianapolis, Indiana. It was the 11th edition of the Big Ten Football Championship Game and determined the champion of the Big Ten Conference for the 2021 season. The game began at 8:19 p.m. EST and aired on Fox. The game featured the No. 2 Michigan Wolverines, the East Division champions, and the No. 13 Iowa Hawkeyes, the West Division champions. The game was officially known as the Big Ten Championship Game presented by Discover, owing to its sponsorship by the credit card company.

== Teams ==
The 2021 Big Ten Championship Game featured the Michigan Wolverines, champions of the East Division, and the Iowa Hawkeyes, champions of the West Division. This was the teams' 62nd all-time meeting, with Michigan entering the game leading the series 42–15–4. The teams first met in 1900 and have met frequently since the early 1950s as Big Ten Conference opponents. They last met in 2019, a game which resulted in a 10–3 Michigan win. Further, this was the first time that Michigan and Iowa met in the postseason.

In its eleventh year of existence, this year marked Michigan's first-ever appearance in the Big Ten Championship Game. Iowa made its second appearance after debuting in 2015 in a loss to the Michigan State Spartans. Michigan entered the game seeking its 43rd all-time conference championship, while Iowa entered seeking its 12th; each team's last title came in 2004, when the Wolverines and Hawkeyes shared the conference crown. This game also marked the first time since 2016 that the East Division was not represented by Ohio State.

=== Michigan Wolverines ===
Seventh-year head coach Jim Harbaugh and the Michigan Wolverines began their 2021 season with a series of four straight home games at Michigan Stadium. The first, against Western Michigan, saw the Wolverines dominate the Broncos by five touchdowns, before defeating Washington in a game that drew considerably less hype after the Huskies' upset loss to Montana the week prior. The Wolverines earned a spot at No. 25 in the AP Poll entering their third game, a matchup with Northern Illinois, which they won handily. Michigan then claimed a close decision against Rutgers on homecoming, improving the Wolverines to 4–0 and placing them into the top 15. Entering October, the Wolverines faced their first road conference games; they first faced Wisconsin, whom they defeated by three touchdowns, and then took down Nebraska, though only by three points, thanks to a Jake Moody field goal with under two minutes remaining. This set up the Wolverines for one of the most anticipated matchups of the season so far, a rivalry faceoff between No. 6 Michigan and No. 8 Michigan State, marking the first time since 1964 that the teams had met while each in the top ten. After a back-and-forth game, the Spartans prevailed with a four-point win, handing Michigan its first loss of the season. The Wolverines were able to bounce back, as they began November with a win over Indiana, and followed it up with a road win in State College against the Penn State Nittany Lions. In its final road game, Michigan routed Maryland, winning by 41 points. After this win the Wolverines were ranked fifth in the College Football Playoff poll entering their home finale against archrivals No. 2 Ohio State. For the first time ever under Harbaugh, and the first time since 2011, the Wolverines defeated the Buckeyes and, with the victory, clinched its spot in the championship game with a 8–1 conference record and a head-to-head tiebreaker against Ohio State. As a result of the win, Michigan rose to No. 2 in the College Football Playoff poll entering the Big Ten Championship, behind only No. 1 Georgia.

On December 2, Michigan announced that it would wear a special jersey patch to honor the victims of the 2021 Oxford High School shooting that had taken place in Oxford Township, Michigan on November 30, 2021.

=== Iowa Hawkeyes ===
With 23rd-year head coach Kirk Ferentz at the helm, the Iowa Hawkeyes got their season off to a quick start with wins over two ranked opponents in their first two games. Their season opener saw No. 18 Iowa defeat No. 17 Indiana by four touchdowns, which put them into the top ten in time for their second game, at No. 9 Iowa State. After capturing the lead in the second quarter, Iowa did not relinquish it, and upset the Cyclones by ten points. This win vaulted Iowa to No. 5 in the AP Poll, where they remained through their next two home non-conference victories against Kent State and Colorado State. The Hawkeyes returned to conference play with a road tilt against Maryland, whom they defeated handily. Now 5–0 and ranked No. 3, Iowa returned home to play host to No. 4 Penn State; the Hawkeyes trailed by double-digits in the first quarter but recovered to win the game 23–20, which put them at No. 2 in the polls. Unfortunately for the Hawkeyes, their bid for an undefeated season would come to an end the following week, as they were upset by Purdue at home. Iowa would go on to drop their next game as well, a road matchup with Wisconsin, having been outscored 14–51 in their back-to-back losses. These setbacks dropped Iowa to No. 22 in the initial College Football Playoff rankings, but the Hawkeyes bounced back effectively with a road win at Northwestern and home wins against Minnesota and Illinois. Going into the final weekend of the regular season, Iowa, Minnesota, and Wisconsin remained in contention for a spot in the championship game. The Hawkeyes defeated Nebraska on November 26, thereby eliminating Minnesota from contention for the championship game. On November 27, Minnesota defeated Wisconsin, giving Iowa the outright division championship and a place in the title game.

== Game summary ==
2021 Big Ten Championship Game presented by Discover

Quarter	1	2	3	4	Total
No. 2 Michigan	14	0	7	21	42
No. 13 Iowa	3	0	0	0	3

at Lucas Oil Stadium • Indianapolis, Indiana

- Date: December 4, 2021
- Game time: 8:19 p.m. EST
- Game weather: n/a (game played indoors)
- Game attendance: 67,183
- Referee: Mike Cannon
- TV announcers (Fox): Gus Johnson (play-by-play), Joel Klatt (analyst), Jenny Taft (sideline)
- Box score

Game information

First quarter

- 6:38 Michigan – Blake Corum 67 yd rush (Jake Moody kick) – 4 plays, 80 yards, 1:57 (Michigan 7–0)
- 5:27 Michigan – Roman Wilson 75 yd pass from Donovan Edwards (Jake Moody kick) – 1 play, 75 yards, 0:10 (Michigan 14–0)
- 1:26 Iowa – Caleb Shudak 22 yd FG – 10 plays, 71 yards, 4:01 (Michigan 14–3)

Second quarter

- no scoring plays

Third quarter

- 8:23 Michigan – Hassan Haskins 4 yd rush (Jake Moody kick) – 10 plays, 82 yards, 5:04 (Michigan 21–3)

Fourth quarter

- 11:16 Michigan – Hassan Haskins 1 yd rush (Jake Moody kick) – 4 plays, 36 yards, 1:33 (Michigan 28–3)
- 5:24 Michigan – Erick All 5 yd pass from Cade McNamara (Jake Moody kick) – 8 plays, 81 yards, 3:55 (Michigan 35–3)
- 1:25 Michigan – Donovan Edwards 1 yard run (Jake Moody kick) – 6 plays, 36 yards, 2:56 (Michigan 42–3)

== Statistics ==
=== Team statistics ===
Team statistical comparison
Statistic	Michigan	Iowa
First downs	21	15
Third down efficiency	4–10	5–19
Fourth down efficiency	0–1	0–1
Total plays–net yards	62–461	71–279
Rushing attempts–net yards	34–211	33–104
Yards per rush	6.2	3.2
Yards passing	250	175
Pass completions–attempts	18–28	19–38
Interceptions thrown	2	1
Punt returns–total yards	2–17	2–-6
Kickoff returns–total yards	0–0	0–0
Punts–total yardage	5–255	8–331
Fumbles–lost	0–0	1–0
Penalties–yards	4–50	5–55
Time of possession	28:21	31:39

=== Individual statistics ===
Michigan statistics
Wolverines passing
	C–A	Yds	TD	INT
Cade McNamara	16–24	169	1	1
Donovan Edwards	1–1	75	1	0
J. J. McCarthy	1–3	6	0	1
Wolverines rushing
	Car	Yds	TD	Avg
Blake Corum	5	74	1	14.8
Hassan Haskins	17	56	2	3.3
A. J. Henning	1	29	0	29.0
J. J. McCarthy	4	23	0	5.8
Cornelius Johnson	1	17	0	17.0
Cade McNamara	2	6	0	3.0
Leon Franklin	1	5	0	5.0
Donovan Edwards	3	1	1	0.3
Wolverines receiving
	Rec	Yds	TD	Avg
Roman Wilson	2	82	1	41.0
Luke Schoonmaker	2	49	0	24.5
Erick All	2	43	1	21.5
Hassan Haskins	3	22	0	7.3
Donovan Edwards	3	20	0	6.7
Cornelius Johnson	1	15	0	15.0
Carter Selzer	1	6	0	6.0
Andrel Anthony	1	6	0	6.0
Blake Corum	2	6	0	3.0
Mike Sainristil	1	1	0	1.0

Iowa statistics
Hawkeyes passing
	C–A	Yds	TD	INT
Spencer Petras	9–22	137	0	0
Alex Padilla	10–15	38	0	1
Gavin Williams	0–1	0	0	0
Hawkeyes rushing
	Car	Yds	TD	Avg
Gavin Williams	12	56	0	4.7
Tyler Goodson	18	50	0	2.8
Charlie Jones	1	6	0	6.0
Arland Bruce IV	1	2	0	2.0
Spencer Petras	1	-10	0	-10.0
Hawkeyes receiving
	Rec	Yds	TD	Avg
Sam LaPorta	6	62	0	10.3
Charlie Jones	2	41	0	20.5
Tyler Goodson	6	28	0	4.7
Luke Lachey	1	22	0	22.0
Keagan Johnson	1	13	0	13.0
Arland Bruce IV	2	10	0	5.0
Gavin Williams	1	-1	0	-1.0

== See also ==
- List of Big Ten Conference football champions
