= 2021 Kentucky Wildcats football team =

American college football season

2021 Kentucky Wildcats football

Citrus Bowl champion (vacated)

Citrus Bowl, W 20–17 (vacated) vs. Iowa
- Conference: Southeastern Conference
- Eastern Division

Ranking
- Coaches: No. 15
- AP: No. 18
- Record: 0–3, 10 wins vacated (0–3 SEC, 5 wins vacated)
- Head coach: Mark Stoops (9th season)
- Offensive coordinator: Liam Coen (1st season)
- Offensive scheme: Multiple pro-style
- Defensive coordinator: Brad White (3rd season)
- Co-defensive coordinator: Jon Sumrall (1st season)
- Base defense: 3–4 or 4–3
- Home stadium: Kroger Field

2021 Southeastern Conference football standings
	Conf.			Overall
Team	W		L	W		L
Eastern Division
No. 1 Georgia x#^	8	–	0	14	–	1
No. 18 Kentucky*	5	–	3	10	–	3
Tennessee	4	–	4	7	–	6
Missouri	3	–	5	6	–	7
South Carolina	3	–	5	7	–	6
Florida	2	–	6	6	–	7
Vanderbilt	0	–	8	2	–	10
Western Division
No. 2 Alabama x$^	7	–	1	13	–	2
No. 11 Ole Miss	6	–	2	10	–	3
No. 21 Arkansas	4	–	4	9	–	4
Mississippi State	4	–	4	7	–	6
Texas A&M	4	–	4	8	–	4
Auburn	3	–	5	6	–	7
LSU	3	–	5	6	–	7
Championship: Alabama 41, Georgia 24
# – College Football Playoff champion; ^ – College Football Playoff participant; $ – Conference champion; x – Division champion/co-champions; * – Kentucky vacated all wins due to NCAA violations.; Rankings from AP Poll

The 2021 Kentucky Wildcats football team represented the University of Kentucky (UK) in the 2021 NCAA Division I FBS football season. The Wildcats played their home games at Kroger Field in Lexington, Kentucky, and competed in the East Division of the Southeastern Conference (SEC). They were led by ninth-year head coach Mark Stoops.

On August 2, 2024, the NCAA announced that the University of Kentucky has agreed to accept penalties for violations of impermissible benefits as 11 football players were paid for jobs which they did not perform in the 2021 and 2022 seasons. Under a program created by former UK player and current UK administrator J.J. Housley, football players worked at UK HealthCare as patient transporters. However, time records were falsified and players did not show up and still received payment. A woman employee was terminated but Housley escaped accountability. Although the NCAA has not announced the full penalties, it has been indicated by the university that those penalties will include a 2–year probation and vacation of all games in which the ineligible players participated for those two seasons.

== Preseason ==
=== SEC Media Days ===
Media poll (East Division)
Predicted finish	Team	Votes (1st place)
1	Georgia	923 (124)
2	Florida	784 (7)
3	Kentucky	624 (2)
4	Missouri	555
5	Tennessee	362
6	South Carolina	355 (1)
7	Vanderbilt	149

Media poll (SEC Championship)
Place	Team	Votes
1	Alabama	84
2	Georgia	45
3	Ole Miss	1
4	Texas A&M	1
4	Florida	1
4	Kentucky	1
4	South Carolina	1

== Personnel ==
=== Coaching staff ===
Name	Position	Years at Kentucky
Mark Stoops	Head coach	9th
Vince Marrow	Associate head coach/tight end coach	9th
Liam Coen	Offensive coordinator/quarterbacks coach	1st
Brad White	Defensive coordinator/Outside linebackers coach	4th
John Settle	Running backs coach	1st
Jon Sumrall	Inside linebackers coach /co-defensive coordinator	3rd
Frank Buffano	Safeties coach	2nd
Eric Wolford	Offensive line coach	1st
Scott Woodward	Wide receivers coach	1st
Anwar Stewart	Defensive line coach	2nd
Mark Hill	Strength and conditioning	6th

== Schedule ==
=== Spring game ===
The Wildcats were scheduled to hold spring practices in March and April 2021 with the Kentucky football spring game, which took place in Lexington, KY in April 2021.

=== Regular season ===
The 2021 Kentucky regular-season schedule consisted of seven home games and five away games. UK hosted four SEC opponents: Florida, LSU, Missouri, and rival Tennessee. UK traveled to four SEC opponents: Georgia, Mississippi State, South Carolina, and Vanderbilt. Kentucky was not scheduled to play SEC West opponents Alabama, Arkansas, Auburn, Ole Miss, and Texas A&M in the 2021 regular season. The Wildcats' bye week was during week 8 (on October 23, 2021).

Kentucky's out-of-conference opponents represented the Atlantic Coast Conference (ACC), Southern Conference (SoCon), and Sun Belt Conference (SBC), as well as one FBS independent. The Wildcats hosted SoCon member Chattanooga, SBC member Louisiana-Monroe, and independent New Mexico State. The Wildcats closed out the regular season by traveling to Louisville, KY to face in-state rival Louisville for the Governor's Cup.

Date	Time	Opponent	Rank	Site	TV	Result	Attendance
September 4	12:00 p.m.	Louisiana–Monroe*		Kroger Field; Lexington, KY	SECN	W 45–10 (vacated)	47,693
September 11	7:30 p.m.	Missouri		Kroger Field; Lexington, KY	SECN	W 35–28 (vacated)	58,437
September 18	12:00 p.m.	Chattanooga*		Kroger Field; Lexington, KY	ESPN+/SECN+	W 28–23 (vacated)	55,214
September 25	7:00 p.m.	at South Carolina		Williams-Brice Stadium; Columbia, SC (SEC Nation)	ESPN2	W 16–10 (vacated)	77,559
October 2	6:00 p.m.	No. 10 Florida		Kroger Field; Lexington, KY (rivalry)	ESPN	W 20–13 (vacated)	61,632
October 9	7:30 p.m.	LSU	No. 16	Kroger Field; Lexington, KY (SEC Nation)	SECN	W 42–21 (vacated)	61,690
October 16	3:30 p.m.	at No. 1 Georgia	No. 11	Sanford Stadium; Athens, GA (College GameDay / SEC Nation)	CBS	L 13–30	92,746
October 30	7:00 p.m.	at Mississippi State	No. 12	Davis Wade Stadium; Starkville, MS	SECN	L 17–31	49,487
November 6	7:00 p.m.	Tennessee	No. 18	Kroger Field; Lexington, KY (rivalry)	ESPN2	L 42–45	61,690
November 13	7:00 p.m.	at Vanderbilt		Vanderbilt Stadium; Nashville, TN (rivalry)	ESPN2	W 34–17 (vacated)	25,798
November 20	12:00 p.m.	New Mexico State*		Kroger Field; Lexington, KY	SECN	W 56–16 (vacated)	47,749
November 27	7:30 p.m.	at Louisville*		Cardinal Stadium; Louisville, KY (Governor's Cup)	ESPN2	W 52–21 (vacated)	55,018
January 1, 2022	1:00 p.m.	vs. No. 15 Iowa*	No. 22	Camping World Stadium; Orlando, FL (Citrus Bowl)	ABC	W 20–17 (vacated)	50,769
*Non-conference game; Rankings from AP Poll (and CFP Rankings, after November 2) – Released prior to game; All times are in Central time

== Game summaries ==
=== Louisiana–Monroe ===
Team	1	2	3	4	Total
Louisiana–Monroe	7	0	0	3	10
• Kentucky	14	14	3	14	45

- Date: September 4
- Location: Lexington, KY
- Game start: 12:03 p.m.
- Elapsed time: 3:11
- Game attendance: 47,693
- Game weather: 78 °F (26 °C) • Weather: Sunny • Wind: SW 7 MPH
- Referee: Jason McArthur
- TV announcers (SECN): Taylor Zarzour (play-by-play), Matt Stinchcomb (color), Alyssa Lang (sideline)
- Source: Official Box Score

Scoring summary
1	08:53	ULM	Kadyn Roach 3-yard rush (Calum Sutherland kick) (12 plays, 42 yards, 5:01)	ULM 7–0
1	06:13	UK	Wan'Dale Robinson 33-yard pass from Will Levis (Matt Ruffolo kick) (5 plays, 84 yards, 2:40)	TIE 7–7
1	04:20	UK	Josh Ali 58-yard pass from Will Levis (Matt Ruffolo kick) (1 play, 58 yards, 0:09)	UK 14–7
2	10:40	UK	Chris Rodriguez 2-yard rush (Matt Ruffolo kick) (14 plays, 84 yards, 6:37)	UK 21–7
2	05:44	UK	Wan'Dale Robinson 15-yard pass from Will Levis (Matt Ruffolo kick) (4 plays, 80 yards, 2:24)	UK 28–7
3	03:54	UK	Matt Ruffolo 45-yard field goal (7 plays, 51 yards, 3:40)	UK 31–7
4	13:07	UK	Brenden Bates 4-yard pass from Will Levis (Matt Ruffolo kick) (9 plays, 76 yards, 4:00)	UK 38–7
4	04:39	ULM	Calum Sutherland 29-yard field goal (11 plays, 48 yards, 5:11)	UK 38–10
4	01:00	UK	Michael Drennen II 4-yard rush (Matt Ruffolo kick) (8 plays, 68 yards, 3:39)	UK 45–10

Statistics	ULM	Kentucky
First downs	12	24
Total yards	87	564
Rushing yards	17	145
Passing yards	70	419
Turnovers	0	3
Time of possession	28:13	31:47

Team	Category	Player	Statistics
ULM	Passing	Rhett Rodgriuez	9/17, 56 yards
ULM	Rushing	Chandler Rogers	7 carries, 11 yards
ULM	Receiving	Boogie Knight	6 receptions, 58 yards
Kentucky	Passing	Will Levis	18/26, 367 yards, 4 TD's
Kentucky	Rushing	Chris Rodriguez Jr.	19 carries, 125 yards, 1 TD
Kentucky	Receiving	Josh Ali	5 receptions, 136 yards, 1 TD

=== Missouri ===
Team	1	2	3	4	Total
Missouri	7	7	7	7	28
• Kentucky	14	7	7	7	35

- Date: September 11
- Location: Lexington, KY
- Game start: 7:38 p.m.
- Game attendance: 58,437
- Game weather: Sunny, 74°F, Wind S @ 8 mph
- Referee: Ken Williamson
- TV announcers (SECN): Taylor Zarzour (play-by-play), Matt Stinchcomb (color), Alyssa Lang (sideline)

Statistics	Missouri	Kentucky
First downs	25	26
Total yards	398	520
Rushing yards	104	341
Passing yards	294	179
Turnovers	1	2
Time of possession	27:12	32:48

Team	Category	Player	Statistics
Missouri	Passing	Connor Bazelak	34/51, 294 yards, 4 TDs, 1 INT
Missouri	Rushing	Tyler Badie	14 carries, 61 yards
Missouri	Receiving	Tyler Badie	10 receptions, 88 yards, 1 TD
Kentucky	Passing	Will Levis	10/18, 179 yards, 1 TD, 1 INT
Kentucky	Rushing	Chris Rodriguez Jr.	27 carries, 207 yards, 2 TDs
Kentucky	Receiving	Wan'Dale Robinson	5 receptions, 101 yards

=== Chattanooga ===
Team	1	2	3	4	Total
Chattanooga	7	3	3	10	23
• Kentucky	7	7	0	14	28

- Date: September 18
- Location: Lexington, KY
- Game start: 12:02 p.m.
- Game attendance: 55,214
- Game weather: Sunny, 81°F, Wind E @ 3 mph
- Referee: David Smith
- TV announcers (ESPN+, SEC Network+): Mike Morgan (play-by-play), Ben Hartsock (color), Paul Carcaterra (sideline)

Statistics	Chattanooga	Kentucky
First downs	16	20
Total yards	339	356
Rushing yards	171	102
Passing yards	168	254
Turnovers	1	3
Time of possession	31:42	28:18

Team	Category	Player	Statistics
Chattanooga	Passing	Cole Copeland	21/35, 168 yards, 1 TD, 1 INT
Chattanooga	Rushing	Ailym Ford	21 carries, 128 yards
Chattanooga	Receiving	Reginald Henderson	9 receptions, 75 yards, 1 TD
Kentucky	Passing	Will Levis	23/35, 254 yards, 2 TDs, 2 INTs
Kentucky	Rushing	Chris Rodriguez Jr.	13 carries, 46 yards
Kentucky	Receiving	Wan'Dale Robinson	8 receptions, 111 yards

=== At South Carolina ===
Game Four – Kentucky Wildcats (3-0) at South Carolina Gamecocks (2-1)

Quarter	1	2	3	4	Total
Kentucky	7	3	3	3	16
South Carolina	0	0	7	3	10

at Williams-Brice Stadium • Columbia, South Carolina

- Date: Saturday, September 25, 2021
- Game time: 7:00 p.m. EST
- Game weather: Sunny • Temperature - 74°F
- Game attendance: 77,559
- Referee: Justin Autrey
- TV announcers (ESPN2): Brian Custer (play-by-play), Kelly Stouffer (color) and Lauren Sisler (sideline)
- Box Score

Game information

First quarter

- (8:27) UK – Kavosiey Smoke 15-yard run (Matt Ruffolo Kick). Kentucky 7-0. Drive: 12 plays, 75 yards, 6:33.

Second quarter

- (0:00) UK – Matt Ruffolo 43-yard field goal. Kentucky 10-0. Drive: 10 plays, 57 yards, 4:39.

Third quarter

- (10:52) SC – Jalen Brooks 5-yard pass from Luke Doty (Parker White Kick). Kentucky 10-7. Drive: 10 plays, 75 yards, 4:08.
- (3:43) UK – Matt Ruffolo 21-yard field goal. Kentucky 13-7. Drive: 13 plays, 72 yards, 7:09.

Fourth quarter

- (4:26) UK – Matt Ruffolo 27-yard field goal. Kentucky 16-7. Drive: 9 plays, 51 yards, 5:17.
- (2:31) SC – Parker White 54-yard field goal. Kentucky 16-10. Drive: 5 plays, 39 yards, 1:55.

Statistics	UK	SC
First downs	22	12
Plays–yards	66–332	51–216
Rushes–yards	230	58
Passing yards	102	158
Passing: comp–att–int	15–22–1	17–25–0
Time of possession	35:36	24:24

Team	Category	Player	Statistics
UK	Passing	Will Levis	15/22, 102 yards, INT
UK	Rushing	Chris Rodriguez Jr	26 carries, 144 yards
UK	Receiving	Wan'Dale Robinson	7 receptions, 65 yards
SC	Passing	Luke Doty	17/25, 158 yards, TD
SC	Rushing	Kevin Harris	12 carries, 38 yards
SC	Receiving	Jalen Brooks	4 receptions, 63 yards, TD

=== No. 10 Florida ===
This was the Wildcats' first home win over Florida since 1986.

Team	1	2	3	4	Total
No. 10 Florida	7	3	0	3	13
• Kentucky	7	0	6	7	20

- Date: October 2
- Location: Lexington, KY
- Game start: 6:01 p.m.
- Game attendance: 61,632
- Game weather: Cloudy, 75°F, Wind SW @ 6 mph
- Referee: Marc Curles
- TV announcers (ESPN): Bob Wischusen (play-by-play), Dan Orlovsky (color), Kris Budden (sideline)

Statistics	Florida	Kentucky
First downs	21	13
Total yards	382	224
Rushing yards	171	137
Passing yards	211	87
Turnovers	1	1
Time of possession	36:18	23:42

Team	Category	Player	Statistics
Florida	Passing	Emory Jones	23/31, 203 yards, 1 TD, 1 INT
Florida	Rushing	Emory Jones	13 carries, 63 yards
Florida	Receiving	Jacob Copeland	6 receptions, 59 yards
Kentucky	Passing	Will Levis	7/17, 87 yards, 1 TD, 1 INT
Kentucky	Rushing	Chris Rodriguez Jr.	19 carries, 99 yards, 1 TD
Kentucky	Receiving	Wan'Dale Robinson	4 receptions, 65 yards, 1 TD

=== LSU ===
Team	1	2	3	4	Total
LSU	0	0	7	14	21
• No. 16 Kentucky	7	7	14	14	42

- Date: October 9
- Location: Lexington, KY
- Game start: 7:39 p.m.
- Game attendance: 61,690
- Game weather: Sunny, 72°F, Wind SE @ 5 mph
- Referee: David Smith
- TV announcers (SECN): Tom Hart (play-by-play), Jordan Rodgers (color), Cole Cubelic (sideline)

Statistics	LSU	Kentucky
First downs	22	24
Total yards	408	475
Rushing yards	147	330
Passing yards	261	145
Turnovers	1	0
Time of possession	27:48	32:12

Team	Category	Player	Statistics
LSU	Passing	Max Johnson	22/38, 261 yards, 1 TD
LSU	Rushing	Tyrion Davis-Price	22 carries, 147 yards, 2 TDs
LSU	Receiving	Kayshon Boutte	8 receptions, 73 yards
Kentucky	Passing	Will Levis	14/17, 145 yards, 3 TDs
Kentucky	Rushing	Chris Rodriguez Jr.	16 carries, 147 yards, 1 TD
Kentucky	Receiving	Wan'Dale Robinson	8 receptions, 60 yards, 1 TD

=== At No. 1 Georgia ===
Team	1	2	3	4	Total
No. 11 Kentucky	0	7	0	6	13
• No. 1 Georgia	0	14	10	6	30

- Date: October 16
- Location: Athens, GA
- Game start: 3:45 p.m.
- Game attendance: 92,746
- Game weather: Sunny, 75°F, Wind W @ 15 mph
- Referee: James Carter
- TV announcers (CBS): Brad Nessler (play-by-play), Gary Danielson (color), Jamie Erdahl (sideline)

Statistics	Kentucky	Georgia
First downs	16	20
Total yards	243	416
Rushing yards	51	166
Passing yards	192	250
Turnovers	0	0
Time of possession	37:47	22:13

Team	Category	Player	Statistics
Kentucky	Passing	Will Levis	32/42, 192 yards, 2 TDs
Kentucky	Rushing	Kavosiey Smoke	5 carries, 14 yards
Kentucky	Receiving	Wan'Dale Robinson	12 receptions, 39 yards, 1 TD
Georgia	Passing	Stetson Bennett	14/20, 250 yards, 3 TDs
Georgia	Rushing	James Cook	6 carries, 51 yards
Georgia	Receiving	Brock Bowers	5 receptions, 101 yards, 2 TDs

=== At Mississippi State ===
Team	1	2	3	4	Total
No. 12 Kentucky	7	3	0	7	17
• Mississippi State	0	14	17	0	31

- Date: October 30
- Location: Starkville, MS
- Game start: 6:09 p.m.
- Game attendance: 49,487
- Game weather: Cloudy, 55°F, Wind NW @ 5 mph
- Referee: Lee Hendrick
- TV announcers (SECN): Tom Hart (play-by-play), Jordan Rodgers (color), Cole Cubelic (sideline)

Statistics	Kentucky	Miss State
First downs	14	27
Total yards	216	438
Rushing yards	66	94
Passing yards	150	344
Turnovers	4	0
Time of possession	18:50	41:10

Team	Category	Player	Statistics
Kentucky	Passing	Will Levis	17/28, 150 yards, 1 TD, 3 INTs
Kentucky	Rushing	Chris Rodriguez Jr.	8 carries, 34 yards
Kentucky	Receiving	Wan'Dale Robinson	9 receptions, 79 yards
Miss State	Passing	Will Rogers	36/39, 344 yards, 1 TD
Miss State	Rushing	Jo'Quavious Marks	20 carries, 58 yards, 1 TD
Miss State	Receiving	Jaden Walley	6 receptions, 95 yards

=== Tennessee ===
Team	1	2	3	4	Total
• Tennessee	14	10	14	7	45
No. 18 Kentucky	7	14	14	7	42

- Date: November 6
- Location: Lexington, KY
- Game start: 7:05 p.m.
- Game attendance: 61,690
- Game weather: Sunny, 46°F, Wind N @ 4 mph
- Referee: Steve Marlowe
- TV announcers (ESPN2): Beth Mowins (play-by-play), Kirk Morrison (color), Dawn Davenport (sideline)

Statistics	Tennessee	Kentucky
First downs	17	35
Total yards	461	612
Rushing yards	145	225
Passing yards	316	387
Turnovers	1	1
Time of possession	13:52	46:08

Team	Category	Player	Statistics
Tennessee	Passing	Hendon Hooker	15/20, 316 yards, 4 TDs
Tennessee	Rushing	Jabari Small	4 carries, 55 yards, 1 TD
Tennessee	Receiving	Velus Jones Jr.	5 receptions, 100 yards, 1 TD
Kentucky	Passing	Will Levis	31/49, 372 yards, 3 TDs, 1 INT
Kentucky	Rushing	Chris Rodriguez Jr.	22 carries, 109 yards
Kentucky	Receiving	Wan'Dale Robinson	13 receptions, 166 yards, 1 TD

=== At Vanderbilt ===
Team	1	2	3	4	Total
• Kentucky	7	24	0	3	34
Vanderbilt	3	0	8	6	17

- Date: November 13
- Location: Nashville, TN
- Game start: 6:05 p.m.
- Game attendance: 25,798
- Game weather: Sunny, 42°F, Wind N @ 1 mph
- Referee: Ken Williamson
- TV announcers (ESPN2): Anish Shroff (play-by-play), Mike Golic Jr. (color), Taylor McGregor (sideline)

Statistics	Kentucky	Vanderbilt
First downs	21	16
Total yards	413	266
Rushing yards	236	96
Passing yards	177	170
Turnovers	1	1
Time of possession	29:46	30:14

Team	Category	Player	Statistics
Kentucky	Passing	Will Levis	14/22, 177 yards, 2 TDs, 1 INT
Kentucky	Rushing	Chris Rodriguez Jr.	16 carries, 144 yards, 1 TD
Kentucky	Receiving	Wan'Dale Robinson	6 receptions, 75 yards, 1 TD
Vanderbilt	Passing	Ken Seals	12/17, 87 yards, 1 INT
Vanderbilt	Rushing	Patrick Smith	18 carries, 84 yards
Vanderbilt	Receiving	Chris Pierce Jr	6 receptions, 69 yards, 1 TD

=== New Mexico State ===
Team	1	2	3	4	Total
New Mexico St	7	9	0	0	16
• Kentucky	21	14	14	7	56

- Date: November 20
- Location: Lexington, KY
- Game start: 12:03 p.m.
- Game attendance: 47,749
- Game weather: Sunny, 52°F, Wind SW @ 9 mph
- Referee: Alex Moore
- TV announcers (SECN): Taylor Zarzour (play-by-play), Matt Stinchcomb (color), Tera Talmadge (sideline)

Statistics	New Mexico St	Kentucky
First downs	13	29
Total yards	282	707
Rushing yards	101	248
Passing yards	181	459
Turnovers	2	4
Time of possession	26:07	33:53

Team	Category	Player	Statistics
New Mexico St	Passing	Jonah Johnson	16/35, 181 yards, 1 INT
New Mexico St	Rushing	Juwaun Price	11 carries, 51 yards
New Mexico St	Receiving	Justice Powers	1 reception, 41 yards
Kentucky	Passing	Will Levis	21/31, 419 yards, 4 TDs, 1 INT
Kentucky	Rushing	Chris Rodriguez Jr.	16 carries, 119 yards, 1 TD
Kentucky	Receiving	Wan'Dale Robinson	8 receptions, 181 yards

=== At Louisville ===
Governor’s Cup

Team	1	2	3	4	Total
• Kentucky	14	10	14	14	52
Louisville	7	0	0	14	21

- Date: November 27
- Location: Louisville, KY
- Game start: 7:41 p.m.
- Game attendance: 55,018
- Game weather: Cloudy, 48°F, Wind SW @ 3 mph
- Referee: Matt Loeffler
- TV announcers (ESPN2): Chris Cotter (play-by-play), Mark Herzlich (color), Jalyn Johnson (sideline)

Statistics	Kentucky	Louisville
First downs	28	20
Total yards	511	352
Rushing yards	362	144
Passing yards	149	208
Turnovers	0	1
Time of possession	35:04	24:56

Team	Category	Player	Statistics
Kentucky	Passing	Will Levis	14/18, 149 yards
Kentucky	Rushing	Chris Rodriguez Jr.	16 carries, 121 yards, 1 TD
Kentucky	Receiving	Wan'Dale Robinson	9 receptions, 97 yards
Louisville	Passing	Malik Cunningham	12/20, 145 yards, 1 INT
Louisville	Rushing	Jalen Mitchell	11 carries, 53 yards
Louisville	Receiving	Marshon Ford	6 receptions, 68 yards

=== Vs. No. 15 Iowa (Citrus Bowl) ===
Vrbo Citrus Bowl

Team	1	2	3	4	Total
No. 15 Iowa	0	3	7	7	17
• No. 22 Kentucky	7	6	0	7	20

- Date: January 1, 2022
- Location: Orlando, FL
- Game start: 1:06 p.m.
- Game attendance: 50,769
- Game weather: Sunny, 82°F, Wind S @ 11 mph
- Referee: Jeff Heaser
- TV announcers (ABC): Dave Pasch (play-by-play), Dusty Dvoracek (color), Tom Luginbill (sideline)

Statistics	Iowa	UK
First downs	0	24
Total yards	0	354
Rushing yards	0	121
Passing yards	0	233
Turnovers	3	1
Time of possession	22:06	37:54

Team	Category	Player	Statistics
Iowa	Passing	Spencer Petras	19/30, 211 yards, 1 TD, 3 INTs
Iowa	Rushing	Gavin Williams	16 carries, 98 yards
Iowa	Receiving	Sam LaPorta	7 receptions, 122 yards, 1 TD
Kentucky	Passing	Will Levis	17/28, 233 yards, 1 TD, 1 INT
Kentucky	Rushing	Chris Rodriguez Jr.	20 carries, 107 yards, 1 TD
Kentucky	Receiving	Wan'Dale Robinson	10 receptions, 170 yards

== Rankings ==
Ranking movements Legend: ██ Increase in ranking ██ Decrease in ranking — = Not ranked RV = Received votes
	Week															
Poll	Pre	1	2	3	4	5	6	7	8	9	10	11	12	13	14	Final
AP	—	RV	RV	RV	RV	16	11	15	12	18	RV	RV	RV	25	25	18
Coaches	RV	RV	RV	RV	23	14	11	14	12	17	RV	RV	25	22	20	15
CFP	Not released									18	—	—	—	23	22	Not released

== Statistics ==
=== Scoring ===
==== Scores by quarter (All Home Games) ====
	1	2	3	4	Total
Opponents	49	32	31	44	156
Kentucky	77	63	58	70	268

==== Scores by quarter (All Away Games) ====
	1	2	3	4	Total
Kentucky	35	47	17	33	132
Opponents	10	28	42	29	109

==== Scores by quarter (All Neutral Field Games) ====
	1	2	3	4	Total
Opponents	0	0	0	0	0
Kentucky	0	0	0	0	0

==== Scores by quarter (Home Games – SEC) ====
	1	2	3	4	Total
Opponents	28	20	28	31	107
Kentucky	35	28	41	35	139

==== Scores by quarter (Away Games – SEC) ====
	1	2	3	4	Total
Kentucky	21	37	3	19	80
Opponents	3	28	42	15	88

==== Scores by quarter (Neutral Field – SEC) ====
	1	2	3	4	Total
Opponents	0	0	0	0	0
Kentucky	0	0	0	0	0

==== Scores by quarter (Home Games – NC) ====
	1	2	3	4	Total
Opponents	21	12	3	13	49
Kentucky	42	35	17	35	129

==== Scores by quarter (Away Games – NC) ====
	1	2	3	4	Total
Kentucky	14	10	14	14	52
Opponents	7	0	0	14	21

==== Scores by quarter (Neutral Field – NC) ====
	1	2	3	4	Total
Opponents	0	0	0	0	0
Kentucky	0	0	0	0	0

==== Scores by quarter (All NC Opponents) ====
	1	2	3	4	Total
Opponents	28	12	3	27	70
Kentucky	56	45	31	49	181

==== Scores by quarter (All SEC Opponents) ====
	1	2	3	4	Total
Opponents	31	48	70	46	195
Kentucky	56	65	44	54	219

==== Scores by quarter (All opponents) ====
	1	2	3	4	Total
Opponents	59	60	73	73	265
Kentucky	112	110	75	103	400

== Media affiliates ==
=== Radio ===
- WHAS (AM) (News Radio 840 WHAS), WBUL-FM – Nationwide (Dish Network, SiriusXM, TuneIn radio and iHeartRadio)

=== TV ===
- CBS Family – WKYT (CBS), CBS Sports Network
- ESPN/ABC Family – WTVQ (ABC), ABC, ESPN, ESPN2, ESPNU, ESPN+, SEC Network)
- FOX Family – WDKY (FOX), FOX/FS1, FSN
- NBC – WLEX, NBC Sports, NBCSN
