= 2022 Citrus Bowl =

Postseason college football bowl game

2022 VRBO Citrus Bowl
- 76th Citrus Bowl; Kentucky's win was vacated by the NCAA in 2024.
Kentucky Wildcats	Iowa Hawkeyes
(9–3)	(10–3)
SEC	Big Ten
20	17
Head coach: Mark Stoops	Head coach: Kirk Ferentz
AP / Coaches / CFP; 25 / 20 / 22	AP / Coaches / CFP; 17 / 16 / 15
	1	2	3	4	Total
Kentucky	7	6	0	7	20
Iowa	0	3	7	7	17
- Date: January 1, 2022
- Season: 2021
- Stadium: Camping World Stadium
- Location: Orlando, Florida
- MVP: Wan'Dale Robinson (WR, Kentucky)
- Favorite: Kentucky by 2.5
- Referee: Jeff Heaser (ACC)
- Attendance: 50,769

United States TV coverage
- Network: ABC; ESPN Radio
- Announcers: ABC: Dave Pasch (play-by-play), Dusty Dvoracek (analyst), Tom Luginbill (sideline); ESPN Radio: Marc Kestecher (play-by-play), Ben Hartsock (analyst) & Taylor Davis (sideline)

The 2022 Citrus Bowl was a college football bowl game played on January 1, 2022, with kickoff at 1:00 p.m. EST and televised on ABC. It was the 76th edition of the Citrus Bowl, and was one of the 2021–22 bowl games concluding the 2021 FBS football season. Sponsored by Vrbo, a vacation rental marketplace owned by the HomeAway division of Expedia, the game was officially known as the VRBO Citrus Bowl.

== Teams ==
In the first meeting between the two programs, the game featured the Kentucky Wildcats of the Southeastern Conference (SEC) and the Iowa Hawkeyes of the Big Ten Conference. Both teams received and accepted invitations on Sunday, December 5.

=== Kentucky Wildcats ===
The Wildcats entered the Citrus Bowl with a 9–3 record (5–3 SEC) and a No. 22 ranking in the final CFP poll. Kentucky made its second Citrus Bowl appearance (2019).

=== Iowa Hawkeyes ===
The Hawkeyes, winners of the Big Ten West Division, entered the Citrus Bowl with a 10–3 record (7–2 B1G) and a No. 15 ranking in the final CFP poll. Iowa also made its second Citrus Bowl appearance (2005).

== Game summary ==
2022 Vrbo Citrus Bowl

Quarter	1	2	3	4	Total
No. 22 Kentucky	7	6	0	7	20
No. 15 Iowa	0	3	7	7	17

at Camping World Stadium • Orlando, Florida

- Date: Saturday, January 1, 2022
- Game time: 1:00 p.m. EST
- Game weather: Sunny • Temperature: 82 °F (28 °C) • Wind: 11 mph (18 km/h) S
- Game attendance: 50,769
- Referee: Jeff Heaser
- TV announcers (ABC): Dave Pasch (play-by-play), Dusty Dvoracek (analyst), Tom Luginbill (sideline)
- Box score

Game information

First quarter

- 5:32 UK – Chris Rodriguez Jr. 5-yard pass from Will Levis, Matt Ruffolo kick good. Drive: 13 plays, 80 yards, 7:28. Kentucky 7–0.

Second quarter

- 11:03 IOWA – Caleb Shudak 28-yard field goal. Drive: 10 plays, 55 yards, 4:41. Kentucky 7–3.
- 2:48 UK – Matt Ruffolo 21-yard field goal. Drive: 14 plays, 72 yards, 8:15. Kentucky 10–3.
- 0:38 UK – Matt Ruffolo 27-yard field goal. Drive: 5 plays, 22 yards, 1:31. Kentucky 13–3.

Third quarter

- 3:21 IOWA – Arland Bruce IV 20-yard rush, Caleb Shudak kick good. Drive: 6 plays, 50 yards, 2:46. Kentucky 13–10.

Fourth quarter

- 10:54 IOWA – Sam LaPorta 36-yard pass from Spencer Petras, Caleb Shudak kick good. Drive: 9 plays, 92 yards, 3:15. Iowa 17–13.
- 1:47 UK – Chris Rodriguez Jr. 6-yard rush, Matt Ruffolo kick good. Drive: 8 plays, 80 yards, 1:43. Kentucky 20–17.

=== Statistics ===
Statistics	UK	IOWA
First downs	24	20
Plays–yards	75–354	60–384
Rushes–yards	47–121	30–173
Passing yards	233	211
Passing: comp–att–int	17–28–1	19–30–3
Turnovers		
Time of possession	37:54	22:06

Team	Category	Player	Statistics
Kentucky	Passing	Will Levis	17/28, 233 yards, TD, INT
Kentucky	Rushing	Chris Rodriguez Jr.	20 rushes, 107 yards, TD
Kentucky	Receiving	Wan'Dale Robinson	10 receptions, 170 yards
Iowa	Passing	Spencer Petras	19/30, 211 yards, TD, 3 INT
Iowa	Rushing	Gavin Williams	16 rushes, 98 yards
Iowa	Receiving	Sam LaPorta	7 receptions, 122 yards, TD

== See also ==
- 2021 Cheez-It Bowl, contested at the same venue three days prior
