= Will Levis =

American football player (born 1999)

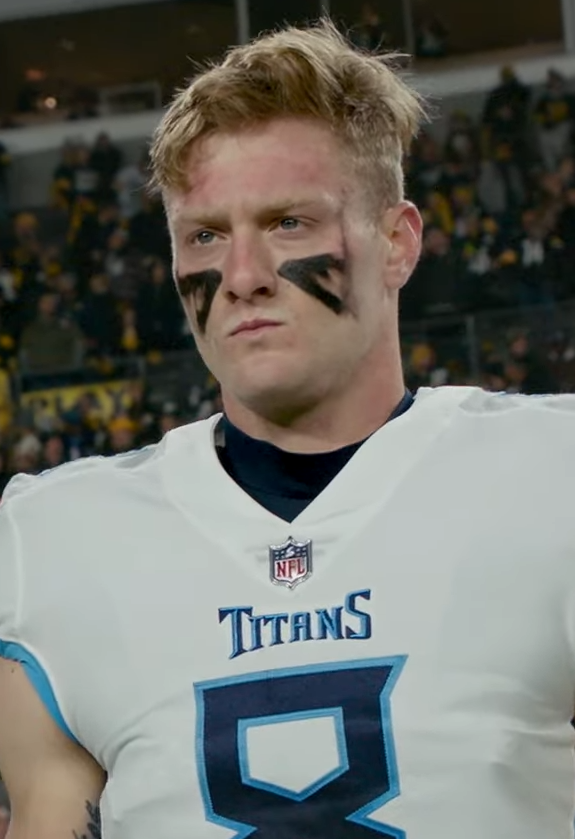
- Levis with the Tennessee Titans in 2023

No. 4 – New York Jets
- Position: Quarterback
- Roster status: Practice squad

Personal information
- Born: June 27, 1999 (age 27); Newton, Massachusetts, U.S.
- Listed height: 6 ft 4 in (1.93 m)
- Listed weight: 229 lb (104 kg)

Career information
- High school: Xavier (Middletown, Connecticut)
- College: Penn State (2018–2020); Kentucky (2021–2022)
- NFL draft: 2023: 2nd round, 33rd overall pick

Career history
- Tennessee Titans (2023–2025); New York Jets (2026–present)*
- * Offseason or practice squad member only

Career NFL statistics as of 2025
- Passing attempts: 556
- Passing completions: 339
- Completion percentage: 61.0%
- TD–INT: 21–16
- Passing yards: 3,899
- Passer rating: 82.7
- Stats at Pro Football Reference

William Donovan Levis (LEV-is; born June 27, 1999) is an American professional football quarterback for the New York Jets of the National Football League (NFL). He played college football for the Penn State Nittany Lions and Kentucky Wildcats before being selected by the Tennessee Titans in the second round of the 2023 NFL draft.

== Early life ==
Levis was born on June 27, 1999, in Newton, Massachusetts, and grew up in Madison, Connecticut. He attended Xavier High School in Middletown, Connecticut, where he set school records as a senior for passing touchdowns with 27 and passing yards with 2,793. Levis committed to Pennsylvania State University to play college football.

== College career ==
=== Penn State ===
Levis attended Pennsylvania State University from 2018 to 2020. After redshirting his first year, Levis spent the next two as Sean Clifford's backup. Levis made his first career start against Rutgers in 2019, completing eight of 14 passes for 81 yards with a touchdown and an interception with 108 rushing yards.

At Penn State, Levis completed 61-of-102 passes for 644 yards, three touchdowns, and two interceptions. He also rushed for 473 yards and six touchdowns.

=== Kentucky ===
Levis transferred to the University of Kentucky in 2021, after having graduated that May with a bachelor's degree in finance from Penn State's Smeal College of Business. He was named the starter to open the season and threw for 367 yards and four touchdowns in his first start. Levis started all 13 games for Kentucky, completing 233-of-353 passes for 2,827 yards and 24 touchdown passes while rushing for 376 yards and nine touchdowns on 107 carries. He led the team to a victory over No. 15 Iowa in the 2022 Citrus Bowl.

== Professional career ==
Pre-draft measurables
Height	Weight	Arm length	Hand span	Wingspan	Vertical jump	Broad jump
6 ft 3 7/8 in (1.93 m)	229 lb (104 kg)	32 in (0.81 m)	10 5/8 in (0.27 m)	6 ft 6 1/8 in (1.98 m)	34.0 in (0.86 m)	10 ft 4 in (3.15 m)
All values from the NFL Combine

=== Tennessee Titans ===
Despite initially being projected as a first-round pick, even being rumored to go first overall just days before the draft, Levis surprisingly fell to the second day of the 2023 NFL draft, where the Tennessee Titans traded up to select him with the 33rd overall pick in the second round. On July 23, 2023, Levis signed a four-year, $9,542,165 contract with a $3,939,756 signing bonus.

==== 2023 season ====
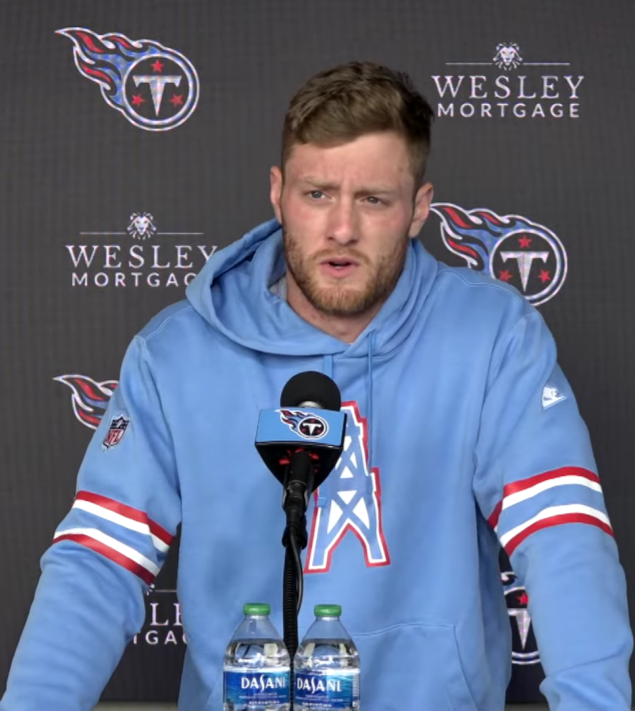
Levis in 2023

Levis began the season as the third-string quarterback behind starter Ryan Tannehill and Malik Willis.

On October 29, 2023, with Tannehill sidelined by an ankle injury, Levis made his NFL debut and first start, finishing with 238 passing yards and four touchdowns during a 28–23 victory over the Atlanta Falcons. The following week, Levis made his second start against the Pittsburgh Steelers on Thursday Night Football, throwing for 262 yards and an interception in the 20–16 road loss.

On November 7, 2023, head coach Mike Vrabel announced that Levis would be the starting quarterback for the Titans moving forward. On December 11, Levis threw for 327 yards, a touchdown, and an interception as the Titans narrowly beat the Miami Dolphins on the road. The Titans trailed by 14 points with 2:49 remaining in the game, but Levis led back-to-back scoring drives to push the Titans ahead by a score of 28–27. This marked his first career 300-yard passing game.

Levis finished his rookie year with 1,808 passing yards, eight touchdowns, and four interceptions in nine games and starts.

==== 2024 season ====
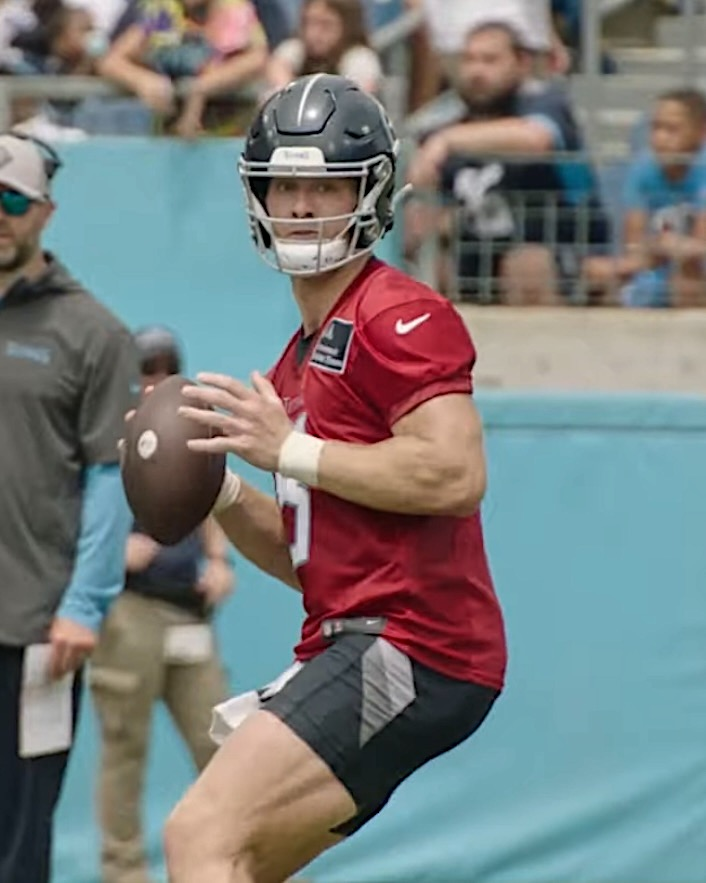
Levis in 2024

Levis became the Titans' starting quarterback in 2024 following the departures of Tannehill and Willis, with newly signed Mason Rudolph named as backup. Levis began the season with a rocky start, going 1–4 during his first five games while completing 86 of 125 passes for 699 yards, five touchdowns, and seven interceptions. Levis led the league in total turnovers during this period, including one that notably went viral of Levis on his knees with his hands on his head after throwing an interception that blew a fourth quarter lead against the Chicago Bears in the season opener.

During a Week 4 31–12 victory over the Miami Dolphins, Levis injured his AC joint after diving on a third down and was relieved by Rudolph. Although Levis was cleared after a Week 5 bye and played in the Week 6 20–17 loss to the Indianapolis Colts, he was sidelined again for the next three games after re-aggravating the injury.

Levis returned from injury in Week 10 against the Los Angeles Chargers. He had a stronger showing in the next game against the Minnesota Vikings, throwing for 295 yards, an interception, and a career high 98-yard touchdown to Nick Westbrook-Ikhine during the 23–13 loss. The touchdown pass tied the franchise record for longest passing touchdown. Levis' improvement continued the following week, leading the Titans to a 32–27 upset road victory over the rival Houston Texans, completing 18 of 24 passes for 278 yards, two touchdowns, and an interception.

During Week 13 against the Washington Commanders, Levis completed 18-of-37 passes for 212 yards, two touchdowns, and no turnovers, a mixed performance on a 42–19 road loss that was marked by team fumbles and a 28–0 first half deficit. The Titans' woes continued with a 10–6 loss to the Jacksonville Jaguars in the next game, the first game of the season where the Titans were unable to score a touchdown and culminated the following week against the Cincinnati Bengals. Against the Bengals, Levis completed eight of 12 passes for 89 yards and three interceptions, ultimately leading to a replacement by Rudolph in the third quarter of the 37–27 loss. Levis was subsequently benched the next two games, but alternated with Rudolph in the season finale against the Texans, completing nine of 17 passes for 175 yards and a touchdown during the 23–14 loss.

Levis finished his second professional season with 2,091 passing yards, 13 touchdowns, and 12 interceptions for an 81.4 passer rating in 12 games and starts.

==== 2025 season ====
Due to the team's poor outing in 2024 with a 3–14 record, the Titans held the first overall pick in the 2025 NFL draft. In the offseason leading up to the draft, new Titans general manager Mike Borgonzi stated: "He's a young quarterback. He's had some good moments and like any other young quarterback, they're continuing to develop", showing confidence in Levis' ability to develop while with the team. Despite this, the Titans drafted Cam Ward first overall.

On July 21, 2025, it was announced that Levis would have surgery on his throwing shoulder and would miss the entire 2025 season. Two days later, Levis was placed on season-ending injured reserve.

==== 2026 season ====
Levis entered the 2026 training camp behind Ward and competing with recently signed free agent Mitchell Trubisky for a spot on the roster as the backup quarterback. On August 30, Levis was waived by the Titans as part of final roster cuts before the start of the regular season.

=== New York Jets ===
On September 22, 2026, Levis signed with the New York Jets' practice squad.

== Career statistics ==
=== NFL ===
Legend
	Led the league
**Bold**	Career high

Year	Team	Games			Passing									Rushing					Sacks		Fumbles	
Year	Team	GP	GS	Record	Cmp	Att	Pct	Yds	Y/A	Lng	TD	Int	Rtg	Att	Yds	Y/A	Lng	TD	Sck	SckY	Fum	Lost
2023	TEN	9	9	**3–6**	149	255	58.4	1,808	**7.1**	61	8	4	**84.2**	25	57	2.3	11	**1**	28	185	7	4
2024	TEN	12	12	2–10	**190**	**301**	**63.1**	**2,091**	6.9	**98T**	**13**	**12**	81.4	**45**	**183**	**4.1**	**21**	0	**41**	**233**	**10**	**6**
2025	TEN	0	0	—	Did not play due to injury																	
Career		21	21	5–16	339	556	61.0	3,899	7.0	98T	21	16	82.7	70	240	3.4	21	1	69	418	17	10

=== College ===
Season	Team	Games			Passing								Rushing			
Season	Team	GP	GS	Record	Cmp	Att	Pct	Yds	Avg	TD	Int	Rtg	Att	Yds	Avg	TD
2018	Penn State	Redshirted (redshirt)														
2019	Penn State	6	1	1−0	28	47	59.6	223	4.7	2	2	105.0	51	213	**4.2**	3
2020	Penn State	8	1	0−1	33	55	60.0	421	7.7	1	0	130.3	82	260	3.2	3
2021	Kentucky	13	13	10−3	**233**	**353**	**66.0**	**2,826**	8.0	**24**	**13**	148.3	**107**	**376**	3.5	**9**
2022	Kentucky	11	11	7−4	185	283	65.4	2,406	**8.5**	19	10	**151.9**	72	107	1.5	2
Career		38	26	18−8	479	738	64.9	5,876	8.0	46	25	145.6	312	742	2.4	17

== Personal life ==
Levis' father, Mike, played football at Denison University, an NCAA Division III school in Ohio, while his mother, Beth Kelley, was a two-time All-American soccer player at Yale. Levis' great-grandfather, Alva Kelley, was an All-American football player at Cornell University and later a head coach for three college teams. Levis graduated from Penn State's Smeal College of Business with a bachelor's degree in finance.

Levis gained media attention in the build-up to the 2023 NFL draft for his strange eating and drinking habits, most notably eating unpeeled bananas and drinking coffee with mayonnaise. On August 22, 2023, Levis announced that he had signed a lifetime supply contract of Hellmann's mayonnaise. In August 2024, Hellmann's announced that it was creating a fragrance inspired by Levis named "Will Levis No. 8, Parfum de Mayonnaise".

On May 27, 2026, Levis' mother revealed that her son had paid an "exorbitant" amount of money to have video of him sharing intimate moments with his then-girlfriend removed from the internet. According to Beth, Eastern European hackers obtained access to Levis' phone when he was in college.

Levis was previously in a long-term relationship with Gia Duddy, who went viral during the 2023 NFL Draft. Following their split, he was briefly linked to reality TV personality Victoria Fuller

Levis was in a relationship with Kaley Champion throughout 2025 and 2026. Following his season-ending shoulder surgery in July 2025, Kaley Champion lived with Levis to assist with his post-operative rehab in California.
