= Keshunn Abram =

American gridiron football player (born 1999)

No. 80
- Position: Wide receiver

Personal information
- Born: February 3, 1999 (age 27); Southaven, Mississippi, U.S.
- Listed height: 6 ft 2 in (1.88 m)
- Listed weight: 193 lb (88 kg)

Career information
- High school: DeSoto Central (Southaven)
- College: Kent State
- NFL draft: 2022: undrafted

Career history
- 2022: New York Jets*
- 2023: Montreal Alouettes
- * Offseason or practice squad member only

Awards and highlights
- Grey Cup champion (2023)
- Stats at CFL.ca

Keshunn Abram (born February 3, 1999) is an American former professional football wide receiver who played for the Montreal Alouettes of the Canadian Football League (CFL). He played college football at Kent State. He was also a member of the New York Jets.

== Early life ==
Abram played high school football at DeSoto Central High School in Southaven, Mississippi as a wide receiver, safety and kick returner. He was a three-year letterman.

== College career ==
Abram played his first two years of college football at Northwest Mississippi Community College. He played in 11 games as a freshman in 2017, recording two receptions for 35 yards. He played in 10 games in 2018, catching 21 passes for 336 yards and a touchdown.

Abram then transferred to play at Kent State from 2019 to 2021. He appeared in eight games in 2019, recording eight receptions for 97 yards. He played in all four games of the COVID-shortened 2020 season, catching two passes for 39 yards and a touchdown. Abram played in 14 games in 2021, catching 47 passes for 680 yards and three touchdowns.

== Professional career ==
Abram signed with the New York Jets of the National Football League (NFL) on May 6, 2022, after going undrafted in the 2022 NFL draft. He was released on August 15, 2022.

Abram signed with the Montreal Alouettes of the Canadian Football League (CFL) on January 31, 2023. He began the 2023 season as a starting receiver for the Alouettes after an injury to Greg Ellingson. Abram played in two games, both starts, in 2023, catching 3 passes for 35 yards, before being placed on injured reserve on June 30, 2023. On November 19, 2023, the Alouettes won the 110th Grey Cup, defeating the Winnipeg Blue Bombers by a score of 28–24. He was released on April 18, 2024.
