= Chris Rodriguez Jr. =

American football player (born 2000)

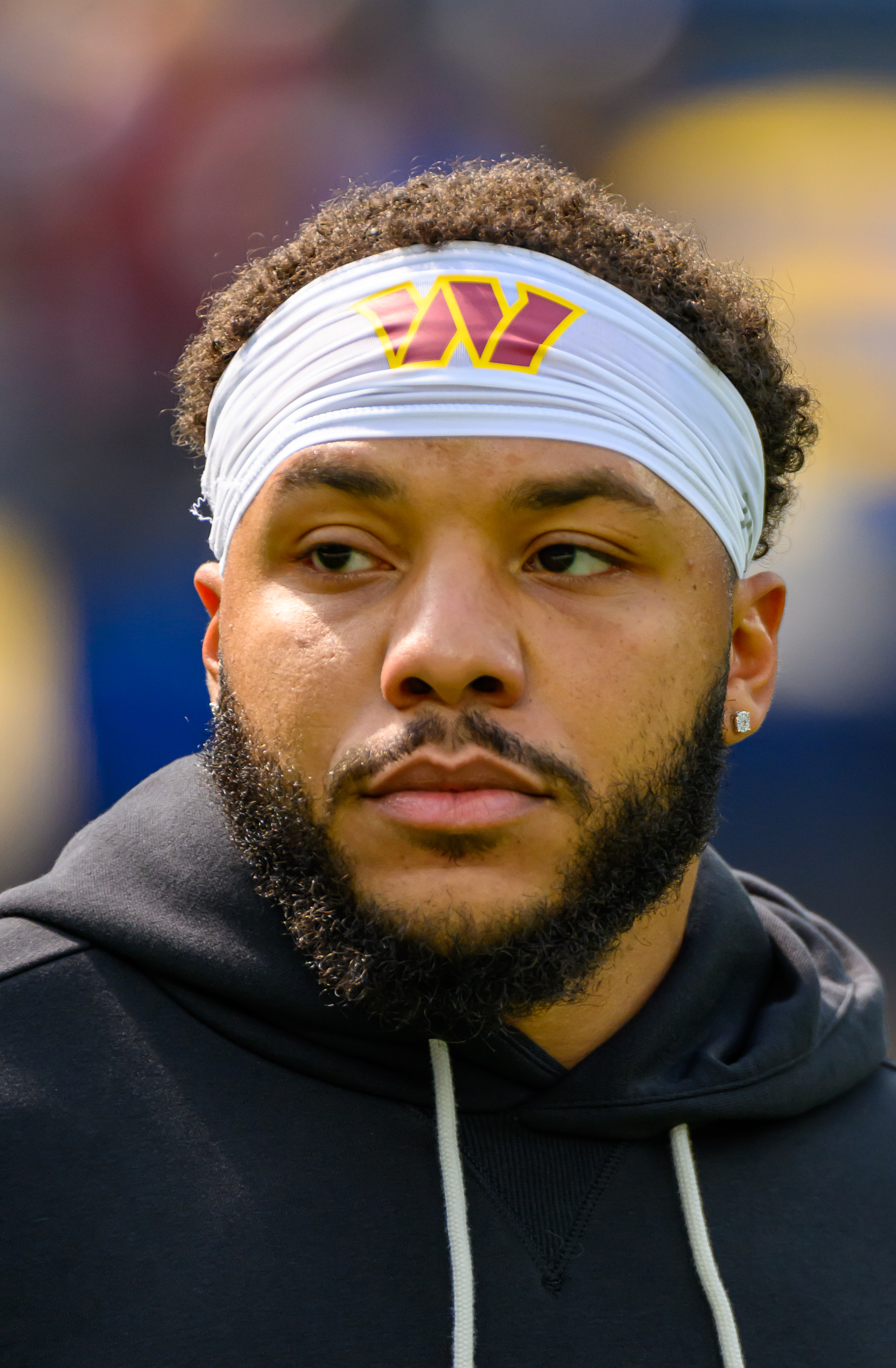
- Rodriguez with the Washington Commanders in 2025

No. 24 – Jacksonville Jaguars
- Position: Running back
- Roster status: Active

Personal information
- Born: September 26, 2000 (age 26); Riverdale, Georgia, U.S.
- Listed height: 5 ft 11 in (1.80 m)
- Listed weight: 224 lb (102 kg)

Career information
- High school: Ola (McDonough, Georgia)
- College: Kentucky (2018–2022)
- NFL draft: 2023: 6th round, 193rd overall pick

Career history
- Washington Commanders (2023–2025); Jacksonville Jaguars (2026–present)

Awards and highlights
- Second-team All-SEC (2021)

Career NFL statistics as of 2025
- Rushing yards: 920
- Rushing average: 4.6
- Rushing touchdowns: 10
- Receptions: 6
- Receiving yards: 54
- Stats at Pro Football Reference

Christopher Rodriguez Jr. (born September 26, 2000) is an American professional football running back for the Jacksonville Jaguars of the National Football League (NFL). He played college football for the Kentucky Wildcats, finishing second in school history in career rushing touchdowns and third in rushing yards before being selected by the Washington Commanders in the sixth round of the 2023 NFL draft.

== Early life ==
Rodriguez was born on September 26, 2000, in Riverdale, Georgia. He played center on the offensive line in middle school until he broke his arm in seventh grade; he was moved to fullback upon returning. He was moved to running back while attending Ola High School, where he recorded 1,669 yards and 25 touchdowns as a senior. Rated a three-star running back prospect, Rodriguez committed to play college football at Kentucky over offers from Colorado State, Mississippi State, and Ole Miss among others.

== College career ==
Rodriguez played in three games and rushed twice for 43 yards in his true freshman season before opting to redshirt the rest of the season. As a redshirt freshman in 2019, he rushed 71 times for 533 yards and six touchdowns. As a redshirt sophomore in 2020, Rodriguez was the Wildcats' leading rusher with 785 yards and 11 touchdowns. As a redshirt junior in 2021, Rodriguez rushed for 1,272 yards and eight touchdowns on 205 carries during the regular season.

In May 2022, Rodriguez was arrested by a campus police officer and charged with driving under the influence (DUI) and careless driving. He pleaded guilty in July and was fined US$200 and had his driver's license revoked for six months. Rodriguez was later accused of filing inaccurate time cards while working part-time at UK HealthCare and was suspended for the first four games of the 2022 season for both incidents. Rodriguez scored a six-yard rushing touchdown with less than two minutes left in the 2022 Citrus Bowl against the Iowa Hawkeyes, helping Kentucky win 20–17. A two-time team captain, he graduated with a degree in community and leadership development in May 2022 and is second in Kentucky history in career rushing touchdowns and third in rushing yards.

== Professional career ==
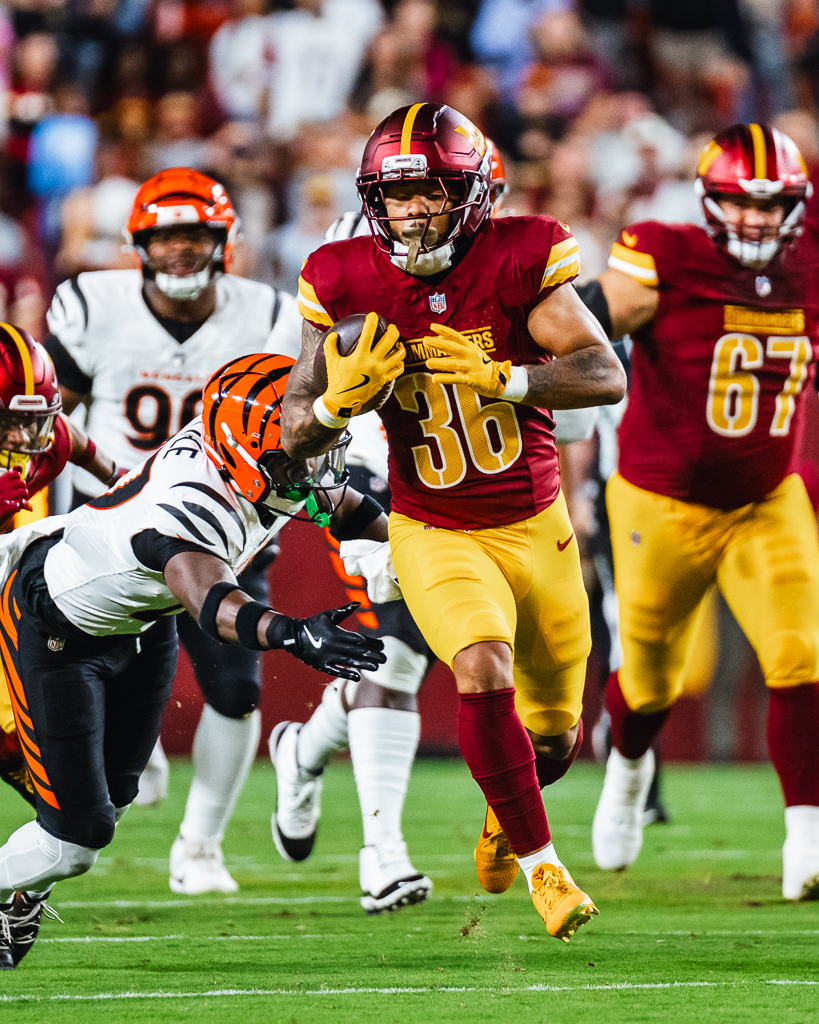
Rodriguez playing with the Washington Commanders, 2025

Pre-draft measurables
Height	Weight	Arm length	Hand span	Wingspan	40-yard dash	10-yard split	20-yard split	20-yard shuttle	Vertical jump	Broad jump	Bench press
5 ft 11 5/8 in (1.82 m)	217 lb (98 kg)	30 5/8 in (0.78 m)	8 5/8 in (0.22 m)	6 ft 1 5/8 in (1.87 m)	4.52 s	1.58 s	2.59 s	4.31 s	33.0 in (0.84 m)	9 ft 6 in (2.90 m)	19 reps
All values from NFL Combine/Pro Day

=== Washington Commanders ===
Rodriguez was selected by the Washington Commanders in the sixth round (193rd overall) of the 2023 NFL draft. He signed his four-year rookie contract on May 12, 2023. On December 28, the Commanders placed him on injured reserve due to concussion symptoms. He appeared in 13 games as a rookie, finishing with 51 carries for 247 rushing yards and two rushing touchdowns.

Rodriguez was waived by the team on August 27, 2024, and joined their practice squad the following day. He was elevated for the team's Week 9 game against the New York Giants, recording 11 rushes for 53 yards. Rodriguez was promoted to the active roster on November 9. He was waived on November 23 and re-signed on November 26. A week later, Rodriguez ran 13 times for a career-high 94 yards and a touchdown in a game against the Tennessee Titans. In the Week 17 win over the Atlanta Falcons, he recorded his third rushing touchdown in the season.

The Commanders tendered Rodriguez, an exclusive rights free agent, on March 7, 2025. He made 13 appearances (including seven starts) for Washington during the regular season, rushing 112 times for 500 yards and six touchdowns, as well as recording three receptions for 30 yards and one touchdown.

=== Jacksonville Jaguars ===
On March 11, 2026, Rodriguez signed a two-year, $10 million contract with the Jacksonville Jaguars. On June 9, it was announced that Rodriguez was recovered from surgery to repair a foot injury that was suffered at the onset of the offseason.

== Career statistics ==
Legend
**Bold**	Career high

=== NFL ===
Year	Team	Games		Rushing					Receiving					Fumbles	
Year	Team	GP	GS	Att	Yds	Avg	Lng	TD	Rec	Yds	Avg	Lng	TD	Fum	Lost
2023	WAS	13	0	51	247	4.8	16	2	2	12	6.0	7	0	**1**	**1**
2024	WAS	9	0	35	173	**4.9**	25	2	1	12	**12.0**	12	0	0	0
2025	WAS	13	7	**112**	**500**	4.5	**48**	**6**	**3**	**30**	10.0	**18**	0	0	0
Career		35	7	198	920	4.6	48	10	6	54	9.0	18	0	1	1

=== College ===
College statistics
Season	GP	Rushing				Receiving			
Season	GP	Att	Yds	Avg	TD	Rec	Yds	Avg	TD
2018	1	2	43	**21.5**	0	0	0	0	0
2019	9	71	533	7.5	6	1	2	2.0	0
2020	9	119	785	6.6	**11**	1	12	**12.0**	0
2021	13	**225**	**1,378**	6.1	10	**13**	**61**	4.7	**3**
2022	8	175	904	5.2	6	5	41	8.2	0
Career	40	592	3,643	6.2	33	20	116	5.8	3

== Personal life ==
Rodriguez is nicknamed C-Rod. His mother, Stephanie Thornton, died from lupus in January 2022.
