= Sam LaPorta =

American football player (born 2001)

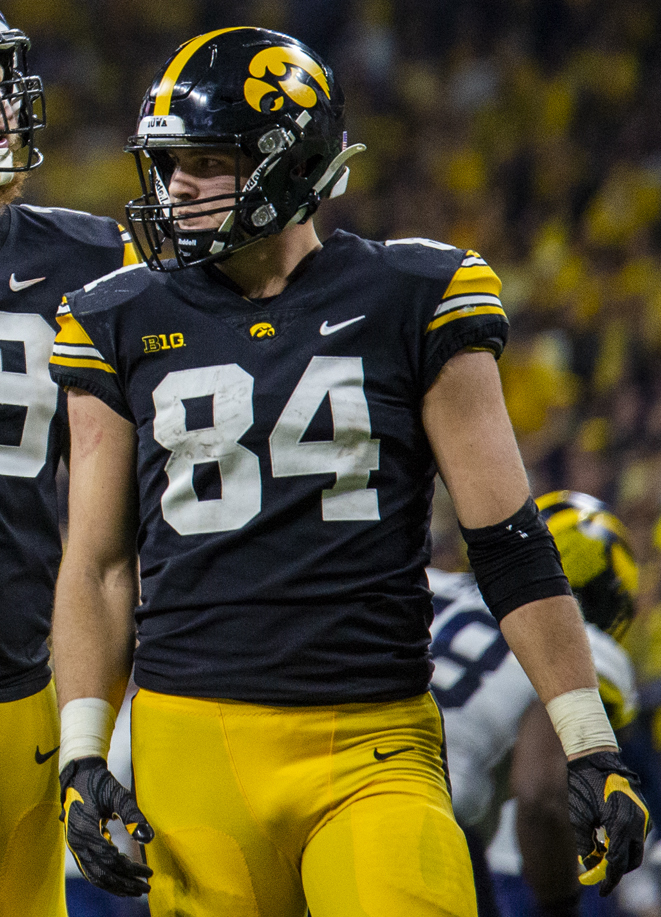
- LaPorta with the Iowa Hawkeyes in 2021

No. 87 – Detroit Lions
- Position: Tight end
- Roster status: Active

Personal information
- Born: January 12, 2001 (age 25); Highland, Illinois, U.S.
- Listed height: 6 ft 3 in (1.91 m)
- Listed weight: 245 lb (111 kg)

Career information
- High school: Highland
- College: Iowa (2019–2022)
- NFL draft: 2023: 2nd round, 34th overall pick

Career history
- Detroit Lions (2023–present)

Awards and highlights
- Second-team All-Pro (2023); Pro Bowl (2023); PFWA All-Rookie Team (2023); Big Ten Tight End of the Year (2022); First-team All-Big Ten (2022); Second-team All-Big Ten (2021)

Career NFL statistics as of Week 10, 2026
- Receptions: 222
- Receiving yards: 2,519
- Receiving touchdowns: 23
- Stats at Pro Football Reference

Samuel Joseph LaPorta (born January 12, 2001) is an American professional football tight end for the Detroit Lions of the National Football League (NFL). He played college football for the Iowa Hawkeyes with whom he was named the Big Ten Tight End of the Year in 2022.

LaPorta was selected by the Lions in the second round of the 2023 NFL draft. As a rookie, he was named second-team All-Pro and voted to the Pro Bowl. He also broke the NFL record for receptions by a rookie tight end (since broken by 2024 rookie Brock Bowers), along with setting Lions franchise records for receptions, receiving yards, and touchdowns by a tight end.

== Early life ==
LaPorta attended Highland High School in Illinois and is of Italian descent. He played wide receiver and defensive back in high school. During his career he had 3,793 receiving yards and 50 touchdowns. LaPorta committed to the University of Iowa to play college football.

== College career ==
=== 2019 season ===
LaPorta entered his freshman season in 2019 behind Nate Wieting and Shaun Beyer in the depth chart. In Week 8 against Northwestern, LaPorta caught his first two career passes for 43 yards in a 20–0 win. In 2019, LaPorta played in 12 games with two starts and had 15 receptions for 188 yards.

=== 2020 season ===
As a sophomore in 2020, LaPorta split starting duties with Beyer for the second year in a row. Against Purdue, LaPorta had a career-high 71 receiving yards on five receptions in a 24–20 loss. He caught his first career touchdown against Illinois while having four receptions for 57 yards in a 35–21 win. LaPorta played in eight games with five starts while recording 27 receptions for 271 yards and one touchdown. He was also named Fourth-Team All-Big Ten Conference by Phil Steele and honorable-mention All-Big Ten by the coaches and media.

=== 2021 season ===
LaPorta became the starting tight end in 2021. He was placed on the Mackey Award Preseason Watch List and was named Preseason Third-Team All-Big Ten by Athlon Sports and Phil Steele. In their first game against ranked Indiana, LaPorta set a new career-best with 83 yards on five receptions in a 34–6 blowout win. Against Kent State, LaPorta caught a career-best seven catches while totaling 65 yards and adding a touchdown in a 30–7 win. He caught another touchdown against Colorado State in a 24–14 win. Against ranked Kentucky in the 2022 Citrus Bowl, LaPorta had his first 100-yard game with seven receptions, matching a career-high, for 122 yards and a touchdown that gave the Hawkeyes the lead. They would not hold on to win, losing 20–17. LaPorta hauled in 53 passes for 670 yards and three touchdowns in 2021, all career-highs. At the end of the season, LaPorta was named Second-Team All-Big Ten by Phil Steele, Third-Team All-Big Ten by the coaches, and honorable-mention All-Big Ten by the media. He was also an Iowa Hawkeyes Team Hustle Award recipient.

=== 2022 season ===
To open the 2022 season, LaPorta was put on the Rotary Lombardi Award and Mackey Award Preseason Watch List as well as being named Preseason Third-Team All-American by Phil Steele, Fourth-Team All-American by Athlon Sports, and First-Team All-Big Ten by both Steele and Athlon. He was also named as one of Iowa's team captains. In a loss to Iowa State, LaPorta caught a career-best eight passes for 55 yards. Against Illinois, he would top that total with nine receptions for 101 yards in a 9–6 loss. Against Purdue, LaPorta caught his only touchdown of the season in a 24–3 win. As true senior in 2022, Laporta had 58 catches for 657 yards. He was named Fourth-Team All-American by Phil Steele, First-Team All-Big Ten, and Kwalick–Clark Tight End of the Year. He finished 14th at Iowa in career receiving yards (1,786) on 153 receptions, ranking first among Iowa tight ends in catches and second in yards.

== Professional career ==
Pre-draft measurables
Height	Weight	Arm length	Hand span	Wingspan	40-yard dash	10-yard split	20-yard split	20-yard shuttle	Three-cone drill	Vertical jump	Broad jump	Bench press
6 ft 3 1/4 in (1.91 m)	245 lb (111 kg)	32 1/8 in (0.82 m)	10 1/4 in (0.26 m)	6 ft 5 1/2 in (1.97 m)	4.59 s	1.59 s	2.61 s	4.25 s	6.91 s	35.0 in (0.89 m)	10 ft 3 in (3.12 m)	16 reps
All values from NFL Combine/Pro Day

=== 2023 season ===
The Detroit Lions selected LaPorta with the 34th overall pick in the second round of the 2023 NFL draft.

On September 24, 2023, LaPorta became the first tight end to tally five receptions in each of his first three games as well as having the most receptions by a tight end in that stretch with 18. He also caught his first career touchdown pass on a 45-yard catch-and-run from Jared Goff. The Lions would end up beating the Atlanta Falcons, 20–6. With his four receptions in Week 4 against the Green Bay Packers, LaPorta broke the record for receptions by a tight end in their first four games with 22. A week later in Week 5 against the Carolina Panthers, LaPorta caught a pair of touchdowns for the first multi-touchdown game of his career while also having three receptions for 47 yards. The Lions would win, 42–24.

In Week 8, LaPorta broke the Lions' franchise record for receptions by a rookie tight end with 43, breaking Charlie Sanders' record of 40 that he set in 1968. During the game, he caught eight passes for 57 yards and a touchdown in the 26–14 win over the Las Vegas Raiders. In the Lions' 22–29 loss to the Packers on Thanksgiving, LaPorta broke Sanders' franchise record of 533 yards by a rookie tight end when he had five catches for 47 yards and a touchdown. In Week 13, LaPorta broke the franchise record for receiving yards by a rookie tight end in a single game with 140 yards and a touchdown on nine receptions. The Lions would beat the New Orleans Saints, 33–28. He was named Pepsi NFL Rookie of the Week for his performance.

In the Lions' Week 15 win over the Denver Broncos, LaPorta became the first rookie tight end since Jeremy Shockey in 2002 to record 70 receptions in a season while also becoming the first rookie tight end since Joseph Fauria in 2013 to record three receiving touchdowns in a single game. He was recognized again as the Pepsi NFL Rookie of the Week for the second time in three weeks. In Week 18 against the Minnesota Vikings, LaPorta broke the single-season rookie tight end record for receptions with 82. It also came on his 10th touchdown of the season. LaPorta also left the game early after hyperextending his knee. After finishing the season with 86 receptions, 889 yards, and a tight end leading 10 touchdowns, LaPorta was named to the 2024 Pro Bowl Games. He was also selected as a Second-team All-Pro by the Associated Press. LaPorta was also named a finalist for the Pepsi Zero Sugar NFL Rookie of the Year Award.

LaPorta set many Lions records during his rookie season. He set new records for receptions, receiving yards, and receiving touchdowns by a tight end overall. All of which were also the Lions' rookie tight end records. His 10 receiving touchdowns were also the record for Lions rookies overall. He was an Offensive Rookie of the Year finalist. He was named to the PFWA All-Rookie Team.

In his first postseason game, LaPorta scored a receiving touchdown in the Wild Card Round win over the Rams. He was ranked 80th by his fellow players on the NFL Top 100 Players of 2024.

=== 2024 season ===
In the 2024 season, LaPorta finished with 60 receptions for 726 yards and seven touchdowns. He scored a receiving touchdown in the Lions' Divisional Round loss to the Washington Commanders. While his production dropped from his first season, LaPorta nonetheless joined Mike Ditka, Rob Gronkowski, and Jimmy Graham as only the fourth tight end in NFL history to log 1,500 receiving yards and 15 receiving touchdowns in his first two seasons. He was ranked 94th by his fellow players on the NFL Top 100 Players of 2025.

=== 2025 season ===
LaPorta began the 2025 season as Detroit's starting tight end, and recorded 489 yards and three touchdowns over the team's first nine games. After suffering a back injury in Week 10 against the Washington Commanders, LaPorta was placed on injured reserve on November 15, 2025. On November 21, it was announced that LaPorta was unlikely to return during the season after undergoing back surgery. He finished 40 receptions for 489 yards and three touchdowns.

== Career statistics ==
=== NFL ===
Legend
	Lions franchise record (for tight ends)
	Led the league (for tight ends)
**Bold**	Career high

==== Regular season ====
Year	Team	Games		Receiving					Rushing					Fumbles	
Year	Team	GP	GS	Rec	Yds	Avg	Lng	TD	Att	Yds	Avg	Lng	TD	Fum	Lost
2023	DET	17	14	**86**	**889**	10.3	48	**10**	**1**	**4**	**4.0**	**4**	0	0	0
2024	DET	16	16	60	726	12.1	**52**	7	0	0	0.0	0	0	0	0
2025	DET	9	9	40	489	**12.2**	40	3	0	0	0.0	0	0	0	0
2026	DET	9	9	36	415	11.5	38	3	1	2	2.0	2	0	0	0
Career		51	48	222	2,519	11.3	52	23	2	6	3.0	4	0	0	0

==== Postseason ====
Year	Team	Games		Receiving					Fumbles	
Year	Team	GP	GS	Rec	Yds	Avg	Lng	TD	Fum	Lost
2023	DET	3	3	21	176	8.4	16	1	0	0
2024	DET	1	1	6	51	8.5	14	1	0	0
Career		4	4	27	227	8.4	16	2	0	0

=== College ===
Season	Team	GP	Receiving			
Season	Team	GP	Rec	Yds	Avg	TD
2019	Iowa	12	15	188	12.5	0
2020	Iowa	8	27	271	10.0	1
2021	Iowa	**14**	53	**670**	**12.6**	**3**
2022	Iowa	12	**58**	657	11.3	1
Career		46	153	1,786	11.7	5

== Career highlights ==
=== Awards and honors ===
NFL

- Second-team All-Pro (2023)
- Pro Bowl (2023)
- PFWA All-Rookie Team (2023)
- 2× NFL Top 100 — 80th (2024), 94th (2025)

College

- Big Ten Tight End of the Year (2022)
- First-team All-Big Ten (2022)
- Second-team All-Big Ten (2021)
- Honorable mention All-Big Ten – Coaches and Media (2020)
- Phil Steele fourth-team All-American (2022)

=== Records ===
==== NFL records ====
- Tied for most touchdowns by a rookie tight end in the Super Bowl era

==== Lions franchise records ====
- Most receptions by a tight end in a single season: 86 (2023)
- Most receptions by a tight end in a rookie season: 86 (2023)
- Most receiving yards by a tight end in a single season: 889 (2023)
- Most receiving yards by a tight end in a rookie season: 889 (2023)
- Most receiving touchdowns by a tight end in a single season: 10 (2023)
- Most receiving touchdowns by a tight end in a rookie season: 10 (2023)
- Most receiving touchdowns by a player in a rookie season: 10 (2023)
- Most receiving yards by a tight end in a rookie game: 140 (December 3, 2023, vs. New Orleans Saints)
