= Wan'Dale Robinson =

American football player (born 2001)

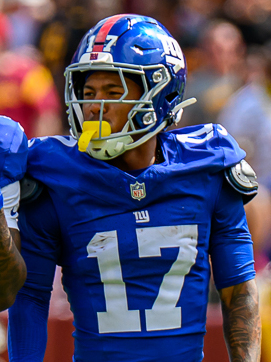
- Robinson with the New York Giants in 2025

No. 4 – Tennessee Titans
- Positions: Wide receiver, return specialist
- Roster status: Injured reserve

Personal information
- Born: January 5, 2001 (age 25); Frankfort, Kentucky, U.S.
- Listed height: 5 ft 8 in (1.73 m)
- Listed weight: 185 lb (84 kg)

Career information
- High school: Western Hills (Frankfort)
- College: Nebraska (2019–2020); Kentucky (2021)
- NFL draft: 2022: 2nd round, 43rd overall pick

Career history
- New York Giants (2022–2025); Tennessee Titans (2026–present)

Awards and highlights
- Second-team All-SEC (2021)

Career NFL statistics as of 2026
- Receptions: 306
- Receiving yards: 2,737
- Receiving touchdowns: 12
- Rushing yards: 110
- Rushing touchdowns: 1
- Return yards: 41
- Stats at Pro Football Reference

Charles Wan'Dale Robinson (born January 5, 2001) is an American professional football wide receiver and return specialist for the Tennessee Titans of the National Football League (NFL). He played college football for the Nebraska Cornhuskers before transferring to the Kentucky Wildcats.

== Early life ==
Robinson was born on January 5, 2001, in Frankfort, Kentucky. He attended Western Hills High School. Throughout his career, he was versatile on both offense and defense. In total, he played as a safety, linebacker, receiver, quarterback, running back, punt returner, and kickoff returner according to his high school coach. Rated as the No. 87 player in the country by 247Sports.com, he originally committed to Kentucky before committing to Nebraska.

== College career ==
=== Nebraska ===
As a freshman at Nebraska, Robinson was used as both a rusher and receiver, rushing for 340 yards on 88 rushes and recording 40 receptions for 453 yards. After the season, he was named a Freshman All–American by The Athletic.

Robinson's role increased in 2020, as he accumulated almost the same amount of scrimmage yards he had in 2019 in two fewer games. He recorded 46 rushes for 240 yards, along with 51 receptions for 461 yards. He was voted honorable mention All–Big Ten by the conference coaches after the season.

=== Kentucky ===
On January 11, 2021, Robinson announced that he was entering the NCAA transfer portal and leaving Nebraska. Four days later, he committed to Kentucky, where he was once engaged to be in high school. Robinson was the No. 1 receiver for the team, accumulating 104 receptions, 1,334 yards and seven touchdown receptions in 13 games. His season total receptions and yards broke single-season school records. Later that year, he helped the Wildcats win the Citrus Bowl.

== Professional career ==
Pre-draft measurables
Height	Weight	Arm length	Hand span	Wingspan	40-yard dash	10-yard split	20-yard split	20-yard shuttle	Three-cone drill	Vertical jump	Broad jump	Bench press
5 ft 8 in (1.73 m)	178 lb (81 kg)	27 5/8 in (0.70 m)	9 in (0.23 m)	5 ft 7 5/8 in (1.72 m)	4.44 s	1.59 s	2.54 s	4.13 s	6.99 s	35.0 in (0.89 m)	9 ft 10 in (3.00 m)	19 reps
All values from NFL Combine/Pro Day

=== New York Giants ===
Robinson was selected by the New York Giants in the second round (43rd overall) of the 2022 NFL draft. Robinson made his NFL debut in the Giants' 2022 season opener against the Tennessee Titans and opened the season as the team's starting slot receiver, recording one reception for five yards, but suffered a knee injury and was out for the rest of the game. He returned from his injury in Week 6 against the Baltimore Ravens and recorded three receptions for 37 yards and a touchdown as the Giants beat the Ravens 24–20. In Week 7 win against the Jacksonville Jaguars, Robinson recorded 6 catches for 50 yards. In Week 11 loss against the Detroit Lions, Robinson had 9 catches for 100 yards but suffered an ACL tear and was placed on injured reserve. He finished his rookie season with 23 receptions for 227 yards and a touchdown in six games.

In Week 14 against the Green Bay Packers, Robinson put up a season-high 115 total yards and 8 touches, receiving a pass from Tommy DeVito to set up a game-winning field goal, winning 24–22. In the 2023 season, he had 60 receptions for 525 yards and one receiving touchdown to with one rushing touchdown.

During Week 2 of the 2025 NFL Season, Robinson put up a career-high of 142 yards and 8 catches, 1 of which being a touchdown. After Malik Nabers suffered a season-ending ACL injury in Week 4, Robinson became the No. 1 receiver for the rest of the season. Entering Week 17, Robinson needed 99 yards to put up his first 1,000-yard season. He had 97 by halftime, and ended with 113 yards on 11 receptions.

=== Tennessee Titans ===
On March 12, 2026, Robinson signed a four-year deal with the Tennessee Titans worth $70 million with $38 million guaranteed. The move reunited him with Brian Daboll, who had accepted the job as the Titans' offensive coordinator earlier in the offseason. He chose to change his number to #4 in memory of his friend, former player Rondale Moore, who died a month prior to his signing.

== Career statistics ==
=== NFL ===
Legend
**Bold**	Career High

Year	Team	Games		Receiving							Rushing					Fumbles	
Year	Team	GP	GS	Tgt	Rec	Yds	Avg	Y/G	Lng	TD	Att	Yds	Avg	Lng	TD	Fum	Lost
2022	NYG	6	3	31	23	227	9.9	37.8	19	1	2	-1	-0.5	4	0	-	-
2023	NYG	15	8	78	60	525	8.8	35.0	33	1	**9**	**87**	**9.7**	**32**	**1**	-	-
2024	NYG	17	7	**140**	**93**	699	7.5	41.1	35	3	3	18	6.0	13	0	-	-
2025	NYG	16	15	**140**	92	**1,014**	**11.0**	**63.4**	**50**	**4**	3	5	1.7	3	0	**1**	0
2026	TEN	9	3	54	38	272	7.2	30.2	17	3	1	1	1.0	1	0	1	0
Career		63	36	443	306	2,737	8.9	43.4	50	12	18	110	6.3	32	1	2	0

=== College ===
Season	Team	GP	Receiving				Rushing			
Season	Team	GP	Rec	Yds	Avg	TD	Att	Yds	Avg	TD
2019	Nebraska	10	40	453	11.3	2	88	340	3.9	3
2020	Nebraska	8	51	461	9.0	1	46	240	5.2	1
2021	Kentucky	13	104	1,334	12.8	7	7	111	15.9	0
Career		30	185	2,078	11.2	10	141	691	4.9	4
