= Spencer Petras =

American football player and coach (born 1999)

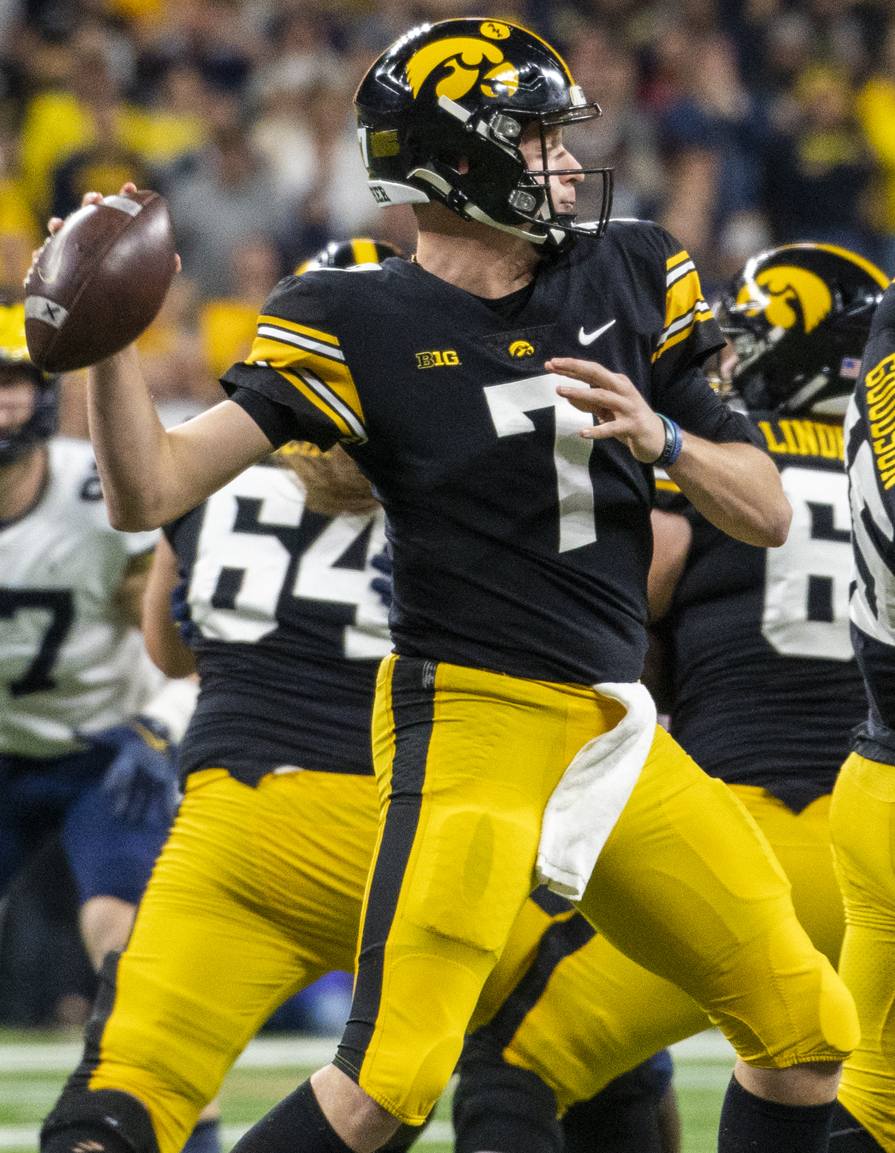
- Petras with Iowa in 2021

Current position
- Title: Assistant offensive line coach
- Team: Fresno State
- Conference: Pac-12

Biographical details
- Born: November 18, 1999 (age 26); San Rafael, California, U.S.
- Education: University of Iowa (2021); Utah State University (2024)

Playing career
- 2018–2023: Iowa
- 2024: Utah State
- Position: Quarterback

Coaching career (HC unless noted)
- 2026–present: Fresno State (asst. OL)

Spencer Petras (born November 18, 1999) is an American college football coach and former quarterback who is the assistant offensive line coach at California State University, Fresno (Fresno State). He played college football for the Iowa Hawkeyes from 2018 to 2023 and the Utah State Aggies in 2024. Petras began his coaching career as the assistant offensive line coach at Fresno State in 2026.

== Early life ==
Petras was born on November 18, 1999, in San Rafael, California. He played high school football at Marin Catholic High School in Kentfield, California. During his time at Marin Catholic, Petras was 35–5 as a starter and led the school to three straight playoff appearances. He was named team MVP as a senior along with being named Metro Player of the Year, he was also a first-team all-conference and team offensive MVP the previous year as a junior. Petras holds the school's record for passing yards in a game (502), passing yards in a season (4,157), passing touchdowns in a game (5), passing touchdowns in a season (50), and single-game completion percentage (100%). During his senior season he led Marin Catholic to an 8–0 record while throwing for 4,157 yards and 50 touchdowns, the team went on to lose in the state's regional finals. Petras was a four-star recruit coming out of high school. Petras originally committed to play college football at Oregon State, but later decommitted and then committed to Iowa on December 15, 2017.

College recruiting
Name	Hometown	School	Height	Weight	Commit date
Spencer Petras; QB	Kentfield, California	Marin Catholic High School	6 ft 5 in (1.96 m)	207 lb (94 kg)	Dec 15, 2017
Spencer Petras; QB	Recruit ratings: Scout: Rivals: 247Sports: ESPN:				
Overall recruit ranking: 247Sports: 421
Note: In many cases, Scout, Rivals, 247Sports, On3, and ESPN may conflict in their listings of height and weight.; In these cases, the average was taken. ESPN grades are on a 100-point scale.; Sources: "2018 Team Ranking". Rivals.com.

== Playing career ==
=== College ===
==== Iowa ====
In 2018, Petras was redshirted and saw action in two games that year as he backed up Nate Stanley. He played in his first career game in a 23–0 win over Maryland as he had one incomplete pass attempt. He then again saw action in a 63–0 win over Illinois although he did not record any stats.

In 2019, Petras' redshirt freshman year he played in three games against Miami, Rutgers, and Middle Tennessee State. In those games he went six for ten passing along with 25 yards and one rush for one yard and a score. He scored his first collegiate touchdown against MTSU with a one yard run on the tail end of a 79 yard fourth quarter drive.

In 2020, Petras was named Iowa's starting quarterback. He started all eight games for the Hawkeyes leading them to a 6–2 record which was good enough for second in the West Division of the Big Ten and would have played in the Music City Bowl against Missouri but the games were cancelled due to the COVID-19 pandemic. Petras was 140–245 for 1,569 yards along with nine touchdowns and five interceptions on the year, along with two rushing touchdowns. He made his first career start in a 24–20 loss against Purdue, going 22 of 39 for 265 yards with no interceptions. He threw his first career touchdown pass against Northwestern in a 21–20 loss where he went 26 of 50 for 216, one touchdown and three interceptions. After starting 0–2, Petras and the Hawkeyes won six straight and finishing the year off beating No. 25 Wisconsin where he completed 14 of 25 attempts for 211 and two touchdowns in a 28–7 win. Iowa finished that year ranked No. 15. Petras was named as an honorable mention for the All-Big Ten All-Conference football team.

In 2021, Petras was named to the Johnny Unitas Golden Arm Award Preseason Watch List. He led the Hawkeyes to a 10–4 (7–2 in Big Ten) record, including wins over No. 17 Indiana, No. 9 Iowa State, and No. 4 Penn State and Iowa was ranked as high as No. 2 in the country going into their game against Purdue. He was also named Big Ten Offensive Player of the Week after beating Maryland 51–14. In that game Iowa gained 428 yards of total offense while Petras went 21 of 30 for 259 yards and three touchdowns, he also ran for another two scores on the ground. His three touchdown passes match a career high and the two rushing touchdowns are a career best. After suffering an injury against Wisconsin, Alex Padilla took over and led the team to three straight wins. Petras and Iowa went on to play No. 2 Michigan in the 2021 Big Ten Football Championship Game, he went 9 of 22 for 137 yards before having to leave the game because of an injury. Iowa faced No. 22 Kentucky in the Citrus Bowl, Petras went 19 of 30 for 211 yards and one touchdown along with three interceptions in a 20–17 loss to end the Hawkeyes season.

In 2022, Petras and Iowa started off the year with a win over No. 2 (FCS) South Dakota State where he went 11 for 25 for 109 yards and an interception to start the Hawkeyes off at 1–0. The team then lost to their rivals 10–7. Then after winning two games in a row against Nevada and Rutgers, Iowa then lost three straight games against No. 2 Michigan, Illinois, and No. 2 Ohio State where Petras had gone 45 of 81 for 465 yards for one touchdown and three interceptions in that three game stretch, while also getting benched late in their 54–10 loss to Ohio State. Petras' season ended after requiring surgery for his shoulder prior to the team's bowl game against Kentucky. Petras entered the transfer portal on November 13, 2023.

==== Utah State ====
Petras was named the starting quarterback to begin the season. In a season opening win against Robert Morris, Petras was injured and missed the following two games. He returned in week four against Temple where he completed 26 of 44 attempts for 293 yards and two touchdowns in a loss. The following week against Boise State he threw for 372 yards and three touchdowns in a loss. In week seven he set a Aggies single game record with 41 completions and 59 attempts for a career high 461 yards and three touchdowns in a loss to UNLV.

=== College statistics ===
Season	Team	Games			Passing								Rushing			
Season	Team	GP	GS	Record	Comp	Att	Pct	Yards	Avg	TD	Int	Rate	Att	Yards	Avg	TD
2018	Iowa	2	0	—	0	1	0.0	0	0.0	0	0	0.0	0	0	0.0	0
2019	Iowa	3	0	—	6	10	60.0	25	2.5	0	0	81.0	1	1	1.0	1
2020	Iowa	8	8	6–2	140	245	57.1	1,569	6.4	9	5	119.0	32	−4	−0.1	2
2021	Iowa	12	11	7–4	165	288	57.3	1,880	6.5	10	9	117.3	48	−109	−2.3	5
2022	Iowa	12	12	7–5	157	281	55.9	1,725	6.1	5	5	109.8	37	−182	−3.2	3
2023	Iowa	DNP (injury—shoulder)														
2024	Utah State	9	9	4–5	214	327	65.4	2,315	7.1	17	11	135.3	36	35	1.0	1
Career		46	40	24–16	682	1,152	59.2	7,514	6.5	41	30	120.5	174	-259	-1.5	12

=== National Football League ===
Pre-draft measurables
Height	Weight	Vertical jump	Broad jump
6 ft 5 in (1.96 m)	234 lb (106 kg)	27.5 in (0.70 m)	8 ft 11 in (2.72 m)
All values from Pro Day

On April 27, 2025, Petras received rookie minicamp invites by the Kansas City Chiefs and the Los Angeles Chargers.

== Coaching career ==
=== Early career ===
Following season-ending surgery after Petras' 2022 season he announced he would rejoin Iowa with an off-the-field role with one year of eligibility remaining for the 2024 season.

=== Fresno State ===
In March 2026, Petras was hired as the assistant offensive line coach at California State University, Fresno (Fresno State) under head coach Matt Entz.

== Personal life ==
Petras is the son of Sarah and Adam Petras.
