= 2022 Penn State Nittany Lions football team =

American college football season

2022 Penn State Nittany Lions football

Lambert-Meadowlands Trophy Rose Bowl champion

Rose Bowl, W 35–21 vs. Utah
- Conference: Big Ten Conference
- East Division

Ranking
- Coaches: No. 7
- AP: No. 7
- Record: 11–2 (7–2 Big Ten)
- Head coach: James Franklin (9th season)
- Offensive coordinator: Mike Yurcich (2nd season)
- Offensive scheme: Spread
- Defensive coordinator: Manny Diaz (1st season)
- Co-defensive coordinator: Anthony Poindexter (2nd season)
- Base defense: 4–3
- Home stadium: Beaver Stadium

Uniform
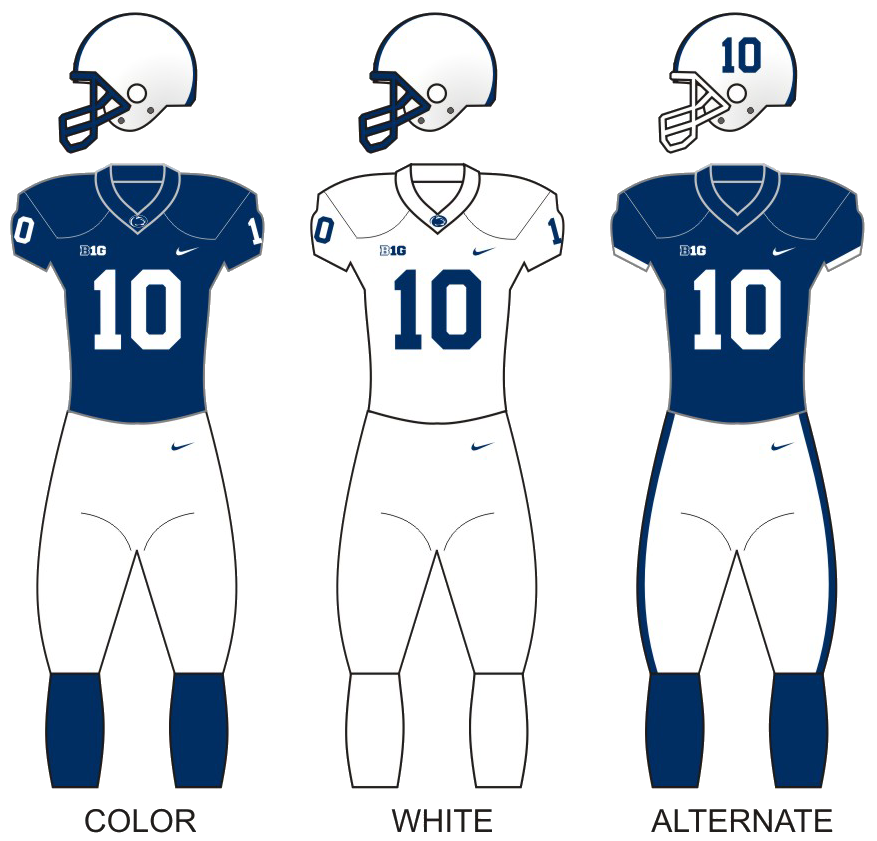

2022 Big Ten Conference football standings
	Conf.			Overall
Team	W		L	W		L
East Division
No. 3 Michigan xy$^	9	–	0	13	–	1
No. 4 Ohio State ^	8	–	1	11	–	2
No. 7 Penn State	7	–	2	11	–	2
Maryland	4	–	5	8	–	5
Indiana	2	–	7	4	–	8
Rutgers	1	–	8	4	–	8
Michigan State†	0	–	6	0	–	7
West Division
Purdue xy	6	–	3	8	–	6
Illinois	5	–	4	8	–	5
Iowa	5	–	4	8	–	5
Minnesota	5	–	4	9	–	4
Wisconsin	4	–	5	7	–	6
Nebraska	3	–	6	4	–	8
Northwestern	1	–	8	1	–	11
Championship: Michigan 43, Purdue 22
^ – College Football Playoff participant; $ – Conference champion; x – Division champion/co-champions; y – Championship game participant; † — NCAA vacated all wins for Michigan State (5–7, 3–6); Rankings from AP Poll

The 2022 Penn State Nittany Lions football team represented Pennsylvania State University in the 2022 NCAA Division I FBS football season as a member of the Big Ten Conference. The team was led by ninth-year head coach James Franklin. The Nittany Lions entered the season unranked for the first time since 2016. Prior to the season, the team recruited the former number one quarterback Drew Allar, and the number one running back Nicholas Singleton.

The Nittany Lions sought to improve from their previous disappointing season, where after starting 5–0, went on to lose six out of their last eight games, culminating in a loss to Arkansas in the Outback Bowl. Despite losing impact players such as Jahan Dotson, Arnold Ebiketie, and Jaquan Brisker to the NFL Draft, the Nittany Lions rebounded going 10–2, only losing to top 4 ranked Michigan and Ohio State, securing them a place in the Rose Bowl, where they would beat Utah to win their first Rose Bowl since 1995, ending the season 11–2. This marked Coach James Franklin's third New Years Six win with the Nittany Lions, and his first Rose Bowl win.

== Offseason ==
=== Players drafted into the NFL ===
Round	Pick	Player	Position	NFL club
1	16	Jahan Dotson	WR	Washington Commanders
2	38	Arnold Ebiketie	OLB	Atlanta Falcons
2	48	Jaquan Brisker	S	Chicago Bears
4	120	Brandon Smith	LB	Carolina Panthers
4	130	Jordan Stout	P	Baltimore Ravens
6	221	Tariq Castro-Fields	CB	San Francisco 49ers
7	249	Rasheed Walker	OT	Green Bay Packers
7	256	Jesse Luketa	LB	Arizona Cardinals

=== Transfers ===
==== Outgoing ====
Player	Position	Destination
Tyler Rudolph	S	UMass
Enzo Jennings	S	Unknown
Des Holmes	OL	Arizona State
Ta'Quan Roberson	QB	UConn
Norval Black	WR	Saint Francis
Joseph Appiah Darkwa	DL	Temple
Justin Weller	WR	Long Island
Noah Cain	RB	LSU
A.J. Lytton	CB	Unknown
Cole Brevard	DT	Purdue

==== Incoming ====
Player	Position	Transferred From
Hunter Nourzad	OL	Cornell
Chop Robinson	DL	Maryland
Mitchell Tinsley	WR	Western Kentucky

Transfer References:

=== Recruiting ===
Going into the 2022 season, the Nittany Lions have the #6 overall recruiting class in the country, and the #2 overall in the Big Ten.

College recruiting (2022)
Name	Hometown	School	Height	Weight	Commit date
Nicholas Singleton; RB	Reading, PA	Governor Mifflin High School	6 ft 0 in (1.83 m)	210 lb (95 kg)	Jul 6, 2021
Nicholas Singleton; RB	Recruit ratings: Rivals: 247Sports: ESPN:				
Dani Dennis-Sutton; DL	Owings Mills, MD	McDonogh School	6 ft 5 in (1.96 m)	250 lb (110 kg)	Jul 22, 2021
Dani Dennis-Sutton; DL	Recruit ratings: Rivals: 247Sports: ESPN:				
Drew Allar; QB	Medina, OH	Medina High School	6 ft 4.5 in (1.94 m)	220 lb (100 kg)	Mar 8, 2021
Drew Allar; QB	Recruit ratings: Rivals: 247Sports: ESPN:				
Kaden Saunders; WR	Westerville, OH	Westerville South High School	5 ft 10 in (1.78 m)	172 lb (78 kg)	Jul 22, 2021
Kaden Saunders; WR	Recruit ratings: Rivals: 247Sports: ESPN:				
Drew Shelton; OT	Downingtown, PA	Downingtown West High School	6 ft 5 in (1.96 m)	260 lb (120 kg)	Sep 4, 2020
Drew Shelton; OT	Recruit ratings: Rivals: 247Sports: ESPN:				
Kaytron Allen; RB	Bradenton, FL	IMG Academy	5 ft 11 in (1.80 m)	220 lb (100 kg)	Jul 16, 2021
Kaytron Allen; RB	Recruit ratings: Rivals: 247Sports: ESPN:				
Mekhi Flowers; ATH	Harrisburg, PA	Central Dauphin East High School	6 ft 1 in (1.85 m)	190 lb (86 kg)	Jan 1, 2021
Mekhi Flowers; ATH	Recruit ratings: Rivals: 247Sports: ESPN:				
Anthony Ivey; WR	Lancaster, PA	Manheim Township High School	6 ft 0 in (1.83 m)	190 lb (86 kg)	Oct 29, 2020
Anthony Ivey; WR	Recruit ratings: Rivals: 247Sports: ESPN:				
Cristian Driver; S	Argyle, TX	Liberty Christian School	5 ft 11 in (1.80 m)	185 lb (84 kg)	Jul 29, 2021
Cristian Driver; S	Recruit ratings: Rivals: 247Sports: ESPN:				
Jerry Cross; TE	Milwaukee, WI	Rufus King High School	6 ft 6 in (1.98 m)	257 lb (117 kg)	Jul 28, 2020
Jerry Cross; TE	Recruit ratings: Rivals: 247Sports: ESPN:				
Camron Miller; CB	Jacksonville, FL	Trinity Christian Academy	6 ft 0 in (1.83 m)	180 lb (82 kg)	Jul 26, 2021
Camron Miller; CB	Recruit ratings: Rivals: 247Sports: ESPN:				
Abdul Carter; LB	Philadelphia, PA	La Salle College High School	6 ft 4 in (1.93 m)	235 lb (107 kg)	
Abdul Carter; LB	Recruit ratings: Rivals: 247Sports: ESPN:				
JB Nelson; OT	Scranton, PA	Lackawanna College	6 ft 5 in (1.96 m)	310 lb (140 kg)	Jul 2, 2021
JB Nelson; OT	Recruit ratings: Rivals: 247Sports: ESPN:				
Zane Durant; DL	Orlando, FL	Lake Nona High School	6 ft 1 in (1.85 m)	255 lb (116 kg)	Jul 4, 2021
Zane Durant; DL	Recruit ratings: Rivals: 247Sports: ESPN:				
KJ Winston; S	Hyattsville, MD	DeMatha Catholic High School	6 ft 1 in (1.85 m)	190 lb (86 kg)	Jul 31, 2021
KJ Winston; S	Recruit ratings: Rivals: 247Sports: ESPN:				
Keon Wylie; LB	Philadelphia, PA	Imhotep Institute Charter High School	6 ft 2 in (1.88 m)	210 lb (95 kg)	Jul 3, 2021
Keon Wylie; LB	Recruit ratings: Rivals: 247Sports: ESPN:				
Beau Pribula; QB	York, PA	Central York High School	6 ft 2 in (1.88 m)	215 lb (98 kg)	Aug 3, 2020
Beau Pribula; QB	Recruit ratings: Rivals: 247Sports: ESPN:				
Omari Evans; WR	Killeen, TX	Shoemaker High School	6 ft 0 in (1.83 m)	170 lb (77 kg)	Oct 2, 2021
Omari Evans; WR	Recruit ratings: Rivals: 247Sports: ESPN:				
Vega Ioane; IOL	Graham, WA	Graham-Kapowsin High School	6 ft 4 in (1.93 m)	320 lb (150 kg)	Feb 2, 2022
Vega Ioane; IOL	Recruit ratings: Rivals: 247Sports: ESPN:				
Kaleb Artis; DL	Fresh Meadows, NY	St. Francis Preparatory School	6 ft 4 in (1.93 m)	290 lb (130 kg)	Jul 4, 2021
Kaleb Artis; DL	Recruit ratings: Rivals: 247Sports: ESPN:				
Tyrece Mills; S	Scranton, PA	Lackawanna College	6 ft 0 in (1.83 m)	205 lb (93 kg)	May 5, 2021
Tyrece Mills; S	Recruit ratings: Rivals: 247Sports: ESPN:				
Tyler Johnson; WR	Ridgeway, VA	Magna Vista High School	6 ft 0 in (1.83 m)	175 lb (79 kg)	Jun 21, 2021
Tyler Johnson; WR	Recruit ratings: Rivals: 247Sports: ESPN:				
Maleek McNeil; OT	Cortlandt Manor, NY	Walter Panas High School	6 ft 7 in (2.01 m)	340 lb (150 kg)	May 1, 2021
Maleek McNeil; OT	Recruit ratings: Rivals: 247Sports: ESPN:				
Alex Bacchetta; P/K	Atlanta, GA	The Westminster Schools	6 ft 3 in (1.91 m)	200 lb (91 kg)	May 25, 2021
Alex Bacchetta; P/K	Recruit ratings: Rivals: 247Sports: ESPN:				
Overall recruit ranking: Scout: 7 247Sports: 8
Note: In many cases, Scout, Rivals, 247Sports, On3, and ESPN may conflict in their listings of height and weight.; In these cases, the average was taken. ESPN grades are on a 100-point scale.; Sources: "2022 Team Ranking". Rivals.com.

Recruiting Reference

== Preseason ==
=== Preseason Big Ten poll ===
Cleveland.com has polled sports journalists representing all member schools as a de facto preseason media poll since 2011. For the 2022 poll, Penn State was projected to finish third in the East Division.

Media poll (East Division)
Predicted finish	Team	Votes (1st place)
1	Ohio State	252 (36)
2	Michigan	203
3	Penn State	169
4	Michigan State	162
5	Maryland	104
6	Rutgers	60
7	Indiana	58

== Personnel ==
=== Coaching staff ===
Penn State football current coaching staff
Name	Position	Alma Mater	Years at Penn State
James Franklin	Head Coach	East Stroudsburg University (1995)	9th
Manny Diaz	Defensive coordinator/linebackers	Florida State (1995)	1st
Mike Yurcich	Offensive coordinator/quarterbacks coach	California University of Pennsylvania (1999)	2nd
Stacy Collins	Special teams coordinator/outside linebackers/Nickels	Western Oregon University (1998)	1st
Terry Smith	Assistant head coach/defensive recruiting coordinator/cornerbacks	Penn State University (1991)	9th
Ty Howle	Tight ends coach	Penn State University (2013)	3rd
Anthony Poindexter	Co-defensive coordinator/safeties	University of Virginia (1999)	2nd
John Scott	Run game coordinator/defensive line	Western Carolina University (2000)	3rd
Ja'Juan Seider	Co-offensive coordinator/running backs	West Virginia University (2000)	5th
Taylor Stubblefield	Offensive recruiting coordinator/wide receivers	Purdue University (2004)	3rd
Phil Trautwein	Offensive line	University of Florida (2007)	3rd
David Parker	Graduate Assistant	University of Arkansas (2015)	1st
Deion Barnes	Graduate Assistant	Penn State University (2014)	2nd

== Schedule ==
Date	Time	Opponent	Rank	Site	TV	Result	Attendance
September 1	8:00 p.m.	at Purdue		Ross–Ade Stadium; West Lafayette, IN (Big Noon Kickoff)	FOX	W 35–31	57,307
September 10	12:00 p.m.	Ohio*		Beaver Stadium; University Park, PA	ABC	W 46–10	107,306
September 17	3:30 p.m.	at Auburn*	No. 22	Jordan–Hare Stadium; Auburn, AL (SEC Nation)	CBS	W 41–12	87,451
September 24	12:00 p.m.	Central Michigan*	No. 14	Beaver Stadium; University Park, PA	BTN	W 33–14	106,624
October 1	3:30 p.m.	Northwestern	No. 11	Beaver Stadium; University Park, PA	ESPN	W 17–7	105,524
October 15	12:00 p.m.	at No. 5 Michigan	No. 10	Michigan Stadium; Ann Arbor, MI (rivalry, Big Noon Kickoff)	FOX	L 17–41	110,812
October 22	7:30 p.m.	Minnesota^{†}	No. 16	Beaver Stadium; University Park, PA (White Out, Governor's Victory Bell)	ABC	W 45–17	109,813
October 29	12:00 p.m.	No. 2 Ohio State	No. 13	Beaver Stadium; University Park, PA (rivalry, Big Noon Kickoff)	FOX	L 31–44	108,433
November 5	3:30 p.m.	at Indiana	No. 15	Memorial Stadium; Bloomington, IN	ABC	W 45–14	45,142
November 12	3:30 p.m.	Maryland	No. 14	Beaver Stadium; University Park, PA (rivalry)	FOX	W 30–0	108,796
November 19	3:30 p.m.	at Rutgers	No. 11	SHI Stadium; Piscataway, NJ	BTN	W 55–10	55,676
November 26	4:00 p.m.	Michigan State	No. 11	Beaver Stadium; University Park, PA (rivalry)	FS1	W 35–16	105,154
January 2, 2023	5:00 p.m.	vs. No. 8 Utah*	No. 11	Rose Bowl; Pasadena, CA (Rose Bowl, College GameDay)	ESPN	W 35–21	94,873
*Non-conference game; ^{†}Homecoming; Rankings from AP Poll and CFP Rankings (after November 1) released prior to game; All times are in Eastern time

== Game summaries ==
=== At Purdue ===
Penn State at Purdue – Game summary

Quarter	1	2	3	4	Total
Penn State	0	21	0	14	35
Purdue	3	7	14	7	31

at Ross–Ade Stadium, West Lafayette, Indiana

- Date: September 1
- Game time: 8:00 p.m. EDT
- Game weather: 79 °F (26 °C), sunny
- Game attendance: 57,307
- Referee: Ron Snodgrass
- TV announcers (FOX): Gus Johnson, Joel Klatt, and Jenny Taft
- ESPN box score, GoPSUsports.com box score

Game information

First quarter

- PU – Mitchell Fineran, 36-yard field goal, 3:38 (3–0, PU)

Second quarter

- PSU – Mitchell Tinsley, 12-yard TD pass from Sean Clifford, Jake Pinegar kick, 13:09 (7–3, PSU)
- PU – King Doerue, 3-yard TD run, Fineran kick, 9:43 (10–7, PU)
- PSU – Clifford, 2-yard TD run, Pinegar kick, 1:44, (14–10, PSU)
- PSU – Brenton Strange, 67-yard TD pass from Clifford, Pinegar kick, 0:02 (21–10, PSU)

Third quarter

- PU – Doerue, 2-yard TD run, Fineran kick, 11:16 (21–17, PSU)
- PU – Charlie Jones, 7-yard TD pass from Aidan O'Connell, Fineran kick, 1:11 (24–21, PU)

Fourth quarter

- PSU – KeAndre Lambert-Smith, 29-yard TD pass from Clifford, Pinegar kick, 10:44 (28–24, PSU)
- PU – Chris Jefferson, 72-yard pass interception return for TD, Fineran kick, 8:29 (31–28, PU)
- PSU – Keyvone Lee, 10-yard TD pass from Clifford, Pinegar kick, 0:57 (35–31, PSU)

Statistics	PSU	PU
First downs	24	26
Plays–yards	73–406	81–426
Rushes–yards	32–98	23–70
Passing yards	308	365
Passing: comp–att–int	22–41–1	29–58–0
Turnovers		
Time of possession	30:44	29:16

Team	Category	Player	Statistics
Penn State	Passing	Sean Clifford	20/37, 282 yards, 4 TD, 1 INT
Penn State	Rushing	Kaytron Allen	8 carries, 31 yards
Penn State	Receiving	Mitchell Tinsley	7 receptions, 84 yards, TD
Purdue	Passing	Aidan O'Connell	29/58, 356 yards, TD
Purdue	Rushing	King Doerue	15 carries, 57 yards, 2 TD
Purdue	Receiving	Charlie Jones	12 receptions, 153 yards, TD

To open the season, the Nittany Lions went on the road to West Layfette to play the Purdue Boilermakers. In recent years, Purdue has been known as "The Spoilermakers," defeating high ranked opponents including #2 Ohio State, #2 Iowa, and #3 Michigan State, costing all of them potential spots in the College Football Playoff. This game was also Purdue's "Blackout" game, similar to Penn State's "Whiteout" game, further increasing the hostility of the already tough environment. Due to these factors sport analysts thought the game would be close, with most saying Penn State would win narrowly, while some thought Purdue would upset them narrowly.

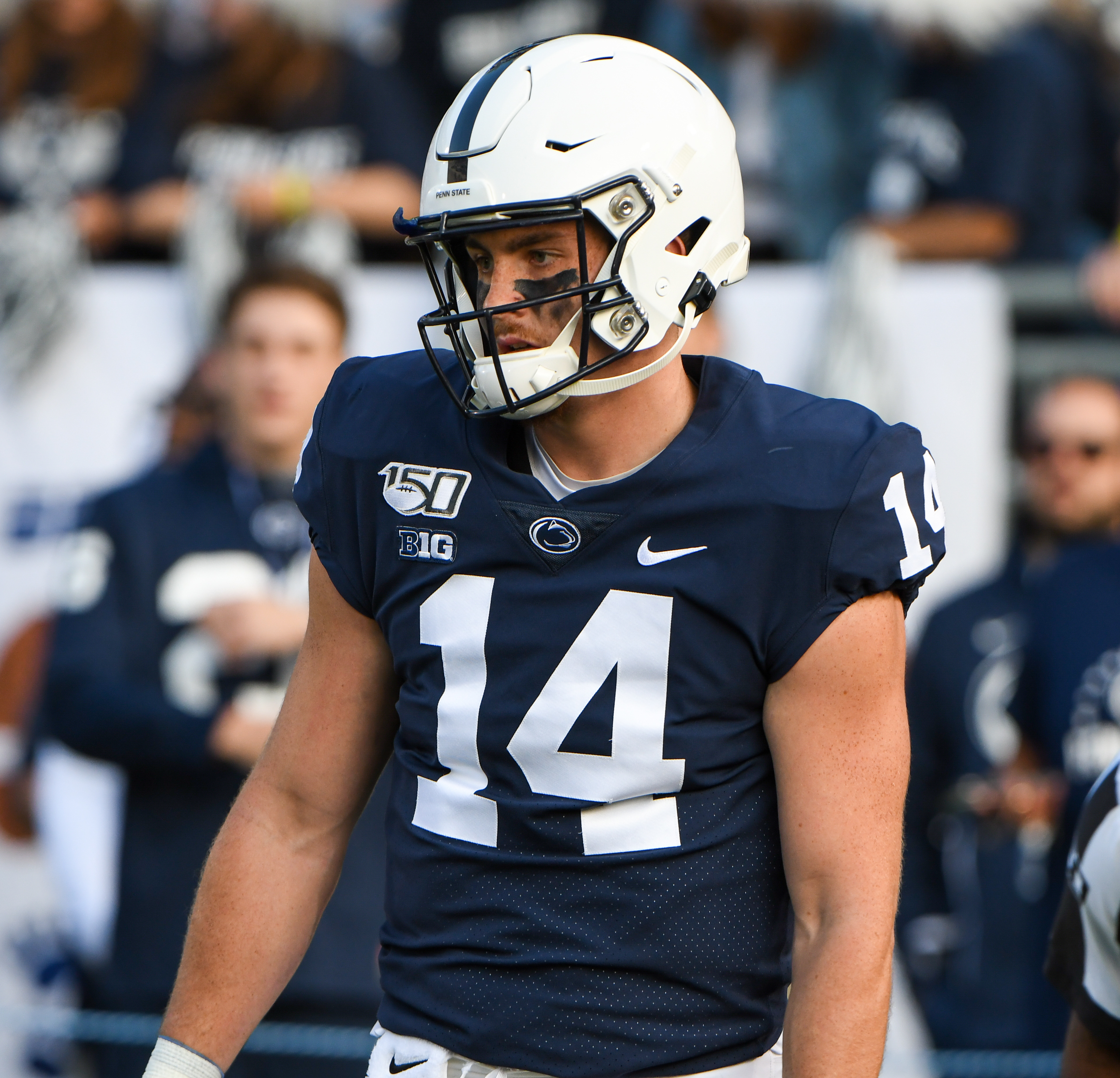
Sean Clifford won Big Ten co-offensive player of the week after his performance against Purdue

The Nittany Lions started the game slow, allowing only a field goal in the first quarter. Penn State was able to get on the board after quarterback Sean Clifford threw a 12-yard touchdown pass to Mitchell Tinsley early in the second. Purdue answered with a touchdown of their own, making the score 10–7. In the last minutes of the quarter, the Nittany Lions scored another touchdown via a 2-yard rush by Clifford, then recovered a fumble by Purdue allowing Clifford to throw a 67-yard touchdown pass to Brenton Strange before halftime, making the score 21–10 at the end of the first half.

Purdue received the ball at the beginning of the third quarter, scoring another touchdown via a 2-yard run from running back King Doerue. Upon receiving the ball, backup quarterback Drew Allar, the former number 1 rated quarterback of his high school class, made his debut for the Nittany Lions after Clifford experienced leg cramps as a result of a tackle made in the last minutes of the second quarter. Clifford was able to return to the game on the following drive. Purdue was able to throw a 7-yard pass to Charlie Jones for a touchdown, giving Purdue a 24–21 lead at the end of the third quarter. The Nittany Lions quickly responded with a 29-yard touchdown pass to KeAndre Lambert-Smith, giving them a 28–24 lead. The Boilermakers were forced to punt, then Clifford threw an interception to Chris Jefferson, who returned it for a 72-yard defensive touchdown, giving Purdue a 31–28 lead. The Nittany Lions were given one final chance to win the game, having 2:22 left in the fourth, and 2 timeouts, Sean Clifford was able to march them down the field and throw a 10-yard touchdown to Keyvone Lee, ending the game at 35–31.

Despite throwing an interception that was returned for a touchdown, Sean Clifford was named Big Ten co-offensive player of the week, after he completed 20-of-37 passes for 282 yards and a career-high-tying four touchdowns.

=== Ohio ===
Ohio at Penn State – Game summary

Quarter	1	2	3	4	Total
Ohio	0	7	0	3	10
Penn State	14	12	14	6	46

at Beaver Stadium, University Park, Pennsylvania

- Date: September 10
- Game time: 12:00 noon EDT
- Game weather: 73 °F (23 °C), cloudy
- Game attendance: 107,306
- Referee: Kole Knueppel
- TV announcers (ABC): Dave Pasch, Dusty Dvoracek, and Tom Luginbill
- ESPN box score, GoPSUsports.com box score

Game information

First quarter

- PSU – Sean Clifford, 1-yard TD run, Jake Pinegar kick, 6:45 (7–0, PSU)
- PSU – Nicholas Singleton, 70-yard TD run, Pinegar kick, 2:28 (14–0, PSU)

Second quarter

- PSU – Safety, Ohio fumble recovered in the endzone, 13:10 (16–0, PSU)
- PSU – Pinegar, 25-yard field goal, 5:14 (19–0, PSU)
- OU – Sieh Bangura, 1-yard TD run, Nathanial Vakos kick, 1:34 (19–7, PSU)
- PSU – Mitchell Tinsley, 7-yard TD pass from Clifford, Pinegar kick, 0:15 (26–7, PSU)

Third quarter

- PSU – Omari Evans, 32-yard TD pass from Drew Allar, Pinegar kick, 9:25 (33–7, PSU)
- PSU – Singleton, 44-yard TD run, Pinegar kick, 4:33 (40–7, PSU)

Fourth quarter

- PSU – Khalil Dinkins, 28-yard TD pass from Allar, Pinegar kick no good, 13:44 (46–7, PSU)
- OU – Vakos, 21-yard field goal, 6:50 (46–10, PSU)

Statistics	OU	PSU
First downs	16	27
Plays–yards	66–263	76–572
Rushes–yards	26–99	34–234
Passing yards	164	338
Passing: comp–att–int	17–40–0	31–42–0
Turnovers		
Time of possession	28:02	31:58

Team	Category	Player	Statistics
Ohio	Passing	Kurtis Rourke	14/30, 119 yards
Ohio	Rushing	Kurtis Rourke	5 carries, 29 yards
Ohio	Receiving	Sieh Bangura	2 receptions, 35 yards
Penn State	Passing	Sean Clifford	19/27, 213 yards, TD
Penn State	Rushing	Nicholas Singleton	10 carries, 179 yards, 2 TD
Penn State	Receiving	Parker Washington	4 receptions, 60 yards

=== At Auburn ===
No. 22 Penn State at Auburn – Game summary

Quarter	1	2	3	4	Total
No. 22 Penn State	7	7	17	10	41
Auburn	3	3	0	6	12

at Jordan–Hare Stadium, Auburn, Alabama

- Date: September 17
- Game time: 3:30 p.m. EDT
- Game weather: 84 °F (29 °C), sunny
- Game attendance: 87,451
- Referee: Michael Cannon
- TV announcers (CBS): Brad Nessler, Gary Danielson, and Jenny Dell
- ESPN box score, GoPSUsports.com box score

Game information

First quarter

- AU – Anders Carlson, 31-yard field goal, 8:20 (3–0, AU)
- PSU – Sean Clifford, 7-yard TD run, Jake Pinegar kick, 4:21 (7–3, PSU)

Second quarter

- AU – Carlson, 22-yard field goal, 6:59 (7–6, PSU)
- PSU – Kaytron Allen, 3-yard TD run, Pinegar kick, 1:46 (14–6, PSU)

Third quarter

- PSU – Nicholas Singleton, 1-yard TD run, Pinegar kick, 12:16 (21–6, PSU)
- PSU – Pinegar, 48-yard field goal, 9:27 (24–6, PSU)
- PSU – Allen, 6-yard TD run, Pinegar kick, 1:07 (31–6, PSU)

Fourth quarter

- AU – Jarquez Hunter, 22-yard TD pass from Robby Ashford, 2-point run conversion failed, 14:27 (31–12, PSU)
- PSU – Singleton, 54-yard TD run, Pinegar kick, 12:03 (38–12, PSU)
- PSU – Pinegar, 22-yard field goal, 5:21 (41–12, PSU)

Statistics	PSU	AU
First downs	19	23
Plays–yards	62–477	74–415
Rushes–yards	39–245	36–119
Passing yards	232	296
Passing: comp–att–int	17–23–0	21–38–2
Turnovers		
Time of possession	30:22	29:38

Team	Category	Player	Statistics
Penn State	Passing	Sean Clifford	14/19, 178 yards
Penn State	Rushing	Nicholas Singleton	10 carries, 124 yards, 2 TD
Penn State	Receiving	Brenton Strange	6 receptions, 80 yards
Auburn	Passing	T. J. Finley	11/19, 152 yards, INT
Auburn	Rushing	Tank Bigsby	9 carries, 39 yards
Auburn	Receiving	Shedrick Jackson	4 receptions, 76 yards

=== Central Michigan ===
Central Michigan at No. 14 Penn State – Game summary

Quarter	1	2	3	4	Total
Central Michigan	0	14	0	0	14
No. 14 Penn State	14	7	6	6	33

at Beaver Stadium, University Park, Pennsylvania

- Date: September 24
- Game time: 12:00 noon EDT
- Game weather: 55 °F (13 °C), sunny
- Game attendance: 106,624
- Referee: Ron Snodgrass
- TV announcers (BTN): Mark Followill, Matt Millen, and Matt McGloin
- ESPN box score, GoPSUsports.com box score

Game information

First quarter

- PSU – Mitchell Tinsley, 5-yard TD pass from Sean Clifford, Jake Pinegar kick, 8:42 (7–0, PSU)
- PSU – Brenton Strange, 4-yard TD pass from Clifford, Pinegar kick, 6:38 (14–0, PSU)

Second quarter

- CMU – Finn Hogan, 2-yard TD pass from Daniel Richardson, Josh Rolston kick, 12:39 (14–7, PSU)
- CMU – Joel Wilson, 14-yard TD pass from Richardson, Rolston kick, 6:25 (14–14, TIE)
- PSU – Kaytron Allen, 14-yard TD run, Pinegar kick, 1:58 (21–14, PSU)

Third quarter

- PSU – Strange, 3-yard TD pass from Clifford, Pinegar kick blocked, 11:55 (27–14, PSU)

Fourth quarter

- PSU – Clifford, 1-yard TD run, 2-point conversion pass incomplete, 14:43 (33–14, PSU)

Statistics	CMU	PSU
First downs	20	21
Plays–yards	75–363	71–403
Rushes–yards	23–88	32–166
Passing yards	275	237
Passing: comp–att–int	29–52–2	24–39–0
Turnovers		
Time of possession	29:33	30:27

Team	Category	Player	Statistics
Central Michigan	Passing	Daniel Richardson	26/45, 235 yards, 2 TD, 2 INT
Central Michigan	Rushing	Lew Nichols III	13 carries, 67 yards
Central Michigan	Receiving	Carlos Carriere	11 receptions, 111 yards
Penn State	Passing	Sean Clifford	22/34, 217 yards, 3 TD
Penn State	Rushing	Kaytron Allen	13 carries, 111 yards, TD
Penn State	Receiving	Parker Washington	6 receptions, 64 yards

=== Northwestern ===
Northwestern at No. 11 Penn State – Game summary

Quarter	1	2	3	4	Total
Northwestern	0	0	7	0	7
No. 11 Penn State	7	7	0	3	17

at Beaver Stadium, University Park, Pennsylvania

- Date: October 1
- Game time: 3:30 p.m. EDT
- Game weather: 52 °F (11 °C), rain
- Game attendance: 105,524
- Referee: Greg Blum
- TV announcers (ESPN): Bob Wischusen, Dan Orlovsky, and Kris Budden
- ESPN box score, GoPSUsports.com box score

Game information

First quarter

- PSU – Brenton Strange, 20-yard TD pass from Sean Clifford, Jake Pinegar kick, 0:15 (7–0, PSU)

Second quarter

- PSU – Nicholas Singleton, 2-yard TD run, Pinegar kick, 5:02 (14–0, PSU)

Third quarter

- NU – Jacob Gill, 47-yard TD pass from Ryan Hilinski, Adam Stage kick, 2:10 (14–7, PSU)

Fourth quarter

- PSU – Pinegar, 38-yard field goal, 14:29 (17–7, PSU)

Statistics	NU	PSU
First downs	12	21
Plays–yards	65–241	78–360
Rushes–yards	28–31	58–220
Passing yards	210	140
Passing: comp–att–int	15–37–1	10–20–1
Turnovers		
Time of possession	22:32	37:28

Team	Category	Player	Statistics
Northwestern	Passing	Ryan Hilinski	15/37, 210 yards, TD, INT
Northwestern	Rushing	Evan Hull	11 carries, 45 yards
Northwestern	Receiving	Donny Navarro III	4 receptions, 55 yards
Penn State	Passing	Sean Clifford	10/20, 140 yards, TD, INT
Penn State	Rushing	Nicholas Singleton	21 carries, 87 yards, TD
Penn State	Receiving	Parker Washington	4 receptions, 73 yards

=== At No. 5 Michigan ===
No. 10 Penn State at No. 5 Michigan – Game summary

Quarter	1	2	3	4	Total
No. 10 Penn State	0	14	3	0	17
No. 5 Michigan	6	10	15	10	41

at Michigan Stadium, Ann Arbor, Michigan

- Date: October 15
- Game time: 12:00 noon EDT
- Game weather: 45 °F (7 °C), sunny
- Game attendance: 110,812
- Referee: Ron Snodgrass
- TV announcers (FOX): Gus Johnson, Joel Klatt, and Jenny Taft
- ESPN box score, GoPSUsports.com box score

Game information

First quarter

- UM – Jake Moody, 29-yard field goal, 9:43 (3–0, UM)
- UM – Moody, 24-yard field goal, 1:25 (6–0, UM)

Second quarter

- UM – Blake Corum, 1-yard TD run, Moody kick, 8:29 (13–0, UM)
- PSU – Kaytron Allen, 1-yard TD run, Jake Pinegar kick, 6:11 (13–7, UM)
- PSU – Curtis Jacobs, 47-yard interception return for TD, Pinegar kick, 4:27 (14–13, PSU)
- UM – Moody, 23-yard field goal, 0:02, (16–14, UM)

Third quarter

- PSU – Pinegar, 27-yard field goal, 13:15 (17–16, PSU)
- UM – Donovan Edwards, 67-yard TD run, Ronnie Bell 2-point conversion pass from J. J. McCarthy, 11:12 (24–17, UM)
- UM – Corum, 61-yard TD run, Moody kick, 7:20 (31–17, UM)

Fourth quarter

- UM – Moody, 37-yard field goal, 11:00 (34–17, UM)
- UM – Edwards, 3-yard TD run, Moody kick, 5:03 (41–17, UM)

Statistics	PSU	UM
First downs	10	28
Plays–yards	51–268	79–563
Rushes–yards	22–111	55–418
Passing yards	157	145
Passing: comp–att–int	12–29–0	17–24–1
Turnovers		
Time of possession	18:04	41:56

Team	Category	Player	Statistics
Penn State	Passing	Sean Clifford	7/19, 120 yards
Penn State	Rushing	Sean Clifford	6 carries, 74 yards
Penn State	Receiving	Mitchell Tinsley	5 receptions, 57 yards
Michigan	Passing	J. J. McCarthy	17/24, 145 yards, INT
Michigan	Rushing	Donovan Edwards	16 carries, 173 yards, 2 TD
Michigan	Receiving	Cornelius Johnson	3 receptions, 43 yards

=== Minnesota ===
Minnesota at No. 16 Penn State – Game summary

Quarter	1	2	3	4	Total
Minnesota	3	7	0	7	17
No. 16 Penn State	0	17	21	7	45

at Beaver Stadium, University Park, Pennsylvania

- Date: October 22
- Game time: 7:30 p.m. EDT
- Game weather: 58 °F (14 °C), partly cloudy
- Game attendance: 109,813
- Referee: Larry Smith
- TV announcers (ABC): Joe Tessitore, Greg McElroy, and Katie George
- ESPN box score, GoPSUsports.com box score

Game information

First quarter

- UM – Matthew Trickett, 35-yard field goal, 1:57 (3–0, UM)

Second quarter

- PSU – Jake Pinegar, 42-yard field goal, 13:55 (3–3, TIE)
- PSU – Tyler Warren, 38-yard TD pass from Sean Clifford, Pinegar kick, 9:05 (10–3, PSU)
- PSU – Theo Johnson, 18-yard TD pass from Clifford, Pinegar kick, 4:01 (17–3, PSU)
- UM – Mohamed Ibrahim, 3-yard TD run, Trickett kick, 0:32 (17–10, PSU)

Third quarter

- PSU – Parker Washington, 35-yard TD pass from Clifford, Pinegar kick, 11:59 (24–10, PSU)
- PSU – Nicholas Singleton, 16-yard TD run, Pinegar kick, 6:33 (31–10, PSU)
- PSU – Mitchell Tinsley, 20-yard TD pass from Clifford, Pinegar kick, 0:27 (38–10, PSU)

Fourth quarter

- UM – Brevyn Spann-Ford, 2-yard TD pass from Athan Kaliakmanis, Trickett kick, 8:03 (38–17, PSU)
- PSU – Singleton, 30-yard TD run, Pinegar kick, 6:35 (45–17, PSU)

Statistics	UM	PSU
First downs	16	24
Plays–yards	68–340	67–479
Rushes–yards	46–165	34–175
Passing yards	175	304
Passing: comp–att–int	9–22–1	24–33–1
Turnovers		
Time of possession	31:30	28:30

Team	Category	Player	Statistics
Minnesota	Passing	Athan Kaliakmanis	9/22, 175 yards, TD, INT
Minnesota	Rushing	Mohamed Ibrahim	30 carries, 102 yards, TD
Minnesota	Receiving	Brevyn Spann-Ford	5 receptions, 68 yards, TD
Penn State	Passing	Sean Clifford	23/31, 295 yards, 4 TD, INT
Penn State	Rushing	Nicholas Singleton	13 carries, 79 yards, 2 TD
Penn State	Receiving	Theo Johnson	5 receptions, 75 yards, TD

=== No. 2 Ohio State ===
No. 2 Ohio State at No. 13 Penn State – Game summary

Quarter	1	2	3	4	Total
No. 2 Ohio State	10	3	3	28	44
No. 13 Penn State	0	14	0	17	31

at Beaver Stadium, University Park, Pennsylvania

- Date: October 29
- Game time: 12:00 noon EDT
- Game weather: 51 °F (11 °C), sunny
- Game attendance: 108,433
- Referee: Jeffrey Servinski
- TV announcers (FOX): Gus Johnson, Joel Klatt, and Jenny Taft
- ESPN box score, GoPSUsports.com box score

Game information

First quarter

- OSU – Noah Ruggles, 38-yard field goal, 9:47 (3–0, OSU)
- OSU – Miyan Williams, 4-yard TD run, Ruggles kick, 2:48 (10–0, OSU)

Second quarter

- PSU – Parker Washington, 58-yard TD pass from Sean Clifford, Jake Pinegar kick, 11:13 (10–7, OSU)
- PSU – KeAndre Lambert-Smith, 23-yard TD pass from Clifford, Pinegar kick, 6:50 (14–10, PSU)
- OSU – Ruggles, 37-yard field goal, 3:14 (14–13, PSU)

Third quarter

- OSU – Ruggles, 40-yard field goal, 0:10 (16–14, OSU)

Fourth quarter

- PSU – Kaytron Allen, 1-yard TD run, Pinegar kick, 9:26 (21–16, PSU)
- OSU – TreVeyon Henderson, 41-yard TD run, Ruggles kick, 8:51 (23–21, OSU)
- OSU – Cade Stover, 24-yard TD pass from C. J. Stroud, Ruggles kick, 8:17 (30–21, OSU)
- PSU – Pinegar, 44-yard field goal, 5:49 (30–24, OSU)
- OSU – Henderson, 7-yard TD run, Ruggles kick, 2:52 (37–24, OSU)
- OSU – JT Tuimoloau, 14-yard interception return for TD, Ruggles kick, 2:42 (44–24, OSU)
- PSU – Allen, 5-yard TD pass from Clifford, Pinegar kick, 1:12 (44–31, OSU)

Statistics	OSU	PSU
First downs	21	24
Plays–yards	60–452	80–482
Rushes–yards	26–98	33–111
Passing yards	354	371
Passing: comp–att–int	26–34–0	32–47–3
Turnovers		
Time of possession	29:34	30:26

Team	Category	Player	Statistics
Ohio State	Passing	C. J. Stroud	26/33, 354 yards, TD
Ohio State	Rushing	TreVeyon Henderson	16 carries, 78 yards, 2 TD
Ohio State	Receiving	Marvin Harrison Jr.	10 receptions, 185 yards
Penn State	Passing	Sean Clifford	32/47, 371 yards, 3 TD, 3 INT
Penn State	Rushing	Kaytron Allen	12 carries, 76 yards, TD
Penn State	Receiving	Parker Washington	11 receptions, 179 yards, TD

=== At Indiana ===
No. 15 Penn State at Indiana – Game summary

Quarter	1	2	3	4	Total
No. 15 Penn State	7	17	7	14	45
Indiana	7	0	0	7	14

at Memorial Stadium, Bloomington, Indiana

- Date: November 5
- Game time: 3:30 p.m. EDT
- Game weather: 65 °F (18 °C), cloudy
- Game attendance: 45,142
- Referee: Michael Cannon
- TV announcers (ABC): Bob Wischusen, Dan Orlovsky, and Kris Budden
- ESPN box score, GoPSUsports.com box score

Game information

First quarter

- PSU – Nicholas Singleton, 1-yard TD run, Jake Pinegar kick, 6:50 (7–0, PSU)
- IU – A. J. Barner, 11-yard TD pass from Jack Tuttle, Charles Campbell kick, 4:09 (7–7, TIE)

Second quarter

- PSU – Kaytron Allen, 11-yard TD run, Pinegar kick, 9:25 (14–7, PSU)
- PSU – Allen, 6-yard TD run, Pinegar kick, 5:04 (21–7, PSU)
- PSU – Pinegar, 50-yard field goal, 0:50 (24–7, PSU)

Third quarter

- PSU – Allen, 6-yard TD run, Pinegar kick, 8:21 (31–7, PSU)

Fourth quarter

- PSU – Harrison Wallace III, 1-yard TD pass from Drew Allar, Pinegar kick, 14:09 (38–7, PSU)
- PSU – Theo Johnson, 4-yard TD pass from Allar, Pinegar kick, 13:51 (45–7, PSU)
- IU – Jaylin Lucas, 1-yard TD run, Campbell kick, 6:16 (45–14, PSU)

Statistics	PSU	IU
First downs	27	11
Plays–yards	84–483	63–196
Rushes–yards	49–179	34–65
Passing yards	304	131
Passing: comp–att–int	24–35–1	16–29–3
Turnovers		
Time of possession	35:53	24:07

Team	Category	Player	Statistics
Penn State	Passing	Sean Clifford	15/23, 229 yards, INT
Penn State	Rushing	Kaytron Allen	18 carries, 86 yards, 3 TD
Penn State	Receiving	Kaytron Allen	2 receptions, 72 yards
Indiana	Passing	Jack Tuttle	9/12, 82 yards, TD
Indiana	Rushing	Josh Henderson	7 carries, 44 yards
Indiana	Receiving	Andison Coby	1 receptions, 35 yards

=== Maryland ===
Maryland at No. 14 Penn State – Game summary

Quarter	1	2	3	4	Total
Maryland	0	0	0	0	0
No. 14 Penn State	14	13	3	0	30

at Beaver Stadium, University Park, Pennsylvania

- Date: November 12
- Game time: 3:30 p.m. EST
- Game weather: 51 °F (11 °C), rain
- Game attendance: 108,796
- Referee: Mark Kluczynski
- TV announcers (FOX): Tim Brando and Spencer Tillman
- ESPN box score, GoPSUsports.com box score

Game information

First quarter

- PSU – Brenton Strange, 3-yard TD pass from Sean Clifford, Jake Pinegar kick, 8:52 (7–0, PSU)
- PSU – Nicholas Singleton, 45-yard TD run, Pinegar kick, 1:25 (14–0, PSU)

Second quarter

- PSU – Singleton, 27-yard TD run, Pinegar kick, 7:46 (21–0, PSU)
- PSU – Pinegar, 50-yard field goal, 1:34 (24–0, PSU)
- PSU – Pinegar, 46-yard field goal, 0:00 (27–0, PSU)

Third quarter

- PSU – Pinegar, 21-yard field goal, 8:15 (30–0, PSU)

Fourth quarter

No scoring

Statistics	UM	PSU
First downs	11	21
Plays–yards	60–134	73–413
Rushes–yards	37–60	43–249
Passing yards	74	164
Passing: comp–att–int	11–23–0	16–30–0
Turnovers		
Time of possession	25:14	34:46

Team	Category	Player	Statistics
Maryland	Passing	Taulia Tagovailoa	11/22, 74 yards
Maryland	Rushing	Roman Hemby	13 carries, 68 yards
Maryland	Receiving	Rakim Jarrett	3 receptions, 30 yards
Penn State	Passing	Sean Clifford	12/23, 139 yards, TD
Penn State	Rushing	Nicholas Singleton	11 carries, 122 yards, 2 TD
Penn State	Receiving	Theo Johnson	3 receptions, 44 yards

=== At Rutgers ===
No. 11 Penn State at Rutgers – Game summary

Quarter	1	2	3	4	Total
No. 11 Penn State	14	14	20	7	55
Rutgers	10	0	0	0	10

at SHI Stadium, Piscataway, New Jersey

- Date: November 19
- Game time: 3:30 p.m EST
- Game weather: 40 °F (4 °C), cloudy
- Game attendance: 55,676
- Referee: Greg Blum
- TV announcers (BTN): Brandon Gaudin, Jake Butt, and Rick Pizzo
- ESPN box score, GoPSUsports.com box score

Game information

First quarter

- RU – Jude McAtamney, 42-yard field goal, 8:06 (3–0, RU)
- PSU – Nicholas Singleton, 100-yard kickoff return, Jake Pinegar kick, 7:54 (7–3, PSU)
- RU – Shameen Jones, 4-yard TD pass from Gavin Wimsatt, McAtamney kick, 5:56 (10–7, RU)
- PSU – Kobe King, fumble recovery returned 14-yards for TD, Pinegar kick, 0:50 (14–10, PSU)

Second quarter

- PSU – Tyler Warren, 10-yard TD pass from Sean Clifford, Pinegar kick, 6:11 (21–10, PSU)
- PSU – Clifford, 14-yard TD run, Pinegar kick, 1:03 (28–10, PSU)

Third quarter

- PSU – Ji'Ayir Brown, fumble recovery returned 70-yards for TD, Pinegar kick, 14:06 (35–10, PSU)
- PSU – Pinegar, 22-yard field goal, 8:10 (38–10, PSU)
- PSU – Kaytron Allen, 8-yard TD run, Pinegar kick, 6:15 (45–10, PSU)
- PSU – Sander Sahaydak, 20-yard field goal, 1:32 (48–10, PSU)

Fourth quarter

- PSU – Drew Allar, 1-yard TD run, Sahaydak kick, 5:44 (55–10, PSU)

Statistics	PSU	RU
First downs	21	9
Plays–yards	73–436	69–167
Rushes–yards	37–237	35–32
Passing yards	199	135
Passing: comp–att–int	22–36–0	15–34–1
Turnovers		
Time of possession	30:23	29:37

Team	Category	Player	Statistics
Penn State	Passing	Sean Clifford	17/26, 157 yards, TD
Penn State	Rushing	Kaytron Allen	11 carries, 117 yards, TD
Penn State	Receiving	Mitchell Tinsley	5 receptions, 63 yards
Rutgers	Passing	Gavin Wimsatt	10/29, 122 yards, TD, INT
Rutgers	Rushing	Rashad Rochelle	8 carries, 25 yards
Rutgers	Receiving	Sean Ryan	2 receptions, 76 yards

=== Michigan State ===
Michigan State at No. 11 Penn State – Game summary

Quarter	1	2	3	4	Total
Michigan State	0	3	7	6	16
No. 11 Penn State	7	7	7	14	35

at Beaver Stadium, University Park, Pennsylvania

- Date: November 26
- Game time: 4:00 p.m. EST
- Game weather: 52 °F (11 °C), sunny
- Game attendance: 105,154
- Referee: Larry Smith
- TV announcers (FS1): Noah Eagle and Mark Helfrich
- ESPN box score, GoPSUsports.com box score

Game information

First quarter

- PSU – Theo Johnson, 11-yard TD pass from Sean Clifford, Jake Pinegar kick, 0:40 (7–0, PSU)

Second quarter

- PSU – Johnson, 48-yard TD pass from KeAndre Lambert-Smith, Pinegar kick, 11:22 (14–0, PSU)
- MSU – Jack Stone, 51-yard field goal, 0:00 (14–3, PSU)

Third quarter

- PSU – Tyler Warren, 14-yard TD pass from Clifford, Pinegar kick, 5:42 (21–3, PSU)
- MSU – Maliq Carr, 9-yard TD pass from Payton Thorne, Stephen Rusnak kick, 1:37 (21–10, PSU)

Fourth quarter

- MSU – Thorne, 2-yard TD run, 2-point conversion pass incomplete, 10:52 (21–16, PSU)
- PSU – Nicholas Singleton, 12-yard TD pass from Clifford, Pinegar kick, 4:31 (28–16, PSU)
- PSU – Lambert-Smith, 35-yard TD pass from Clifford, Pinegar kick, 3:56 (35–16, PSU)

Statistics	MSU	PSU
First downs	19	24
Plays–yards	69–254	70–410
Rushes–yards	25–25	45–160
Passing yards	229	250
Passing: comp–att–int	24–44–1	20–25–0
Turnovers		
Time of possession	25:58	34:02

Team	Category	Player	Statistics
Michigan State	Passing	Payton Thorne	24/43, 229 yards, TD, INT
Michigan State	Rushing	Elijah Collins	10 carries, 33 yards
Michigan State	Receiving	Keon Coleman	8 receptions, 91 yards
Penn State	Passing	Sean Clifford	19/24, 202 yards, 4 TD
Penn State	Rushing	Kaytron Allen	21 carries, 82 yards
Penn State	Receiving	KeAndre Lambert-Smith	5 receptions, 83 yards, TD

=== Vs. No. 8 Utah (Rose Bowl) ===
No. 11 Penn State vs. No. 8 Utah – Game summary

Quarter	1	2	3	4	Total
No. 11 Penn State	7	7	7	14	35
No. 8 Utah	0	14	0	7	21

at Rose Bowl, Pasadena, California

- Date: January 2, 2023
- Game time: 5:00 p.m. EST
- Game weather: 54 °F (12 °C); cloudy
- Game attendance: 94,873
- Referee: Michael Vandervelde
- TV announcers (ESPN/ESPN Radio): Chris Fowler, Kirk Herbstreit, and Holly Rowe/Marc Kestecher, Kelly Stouffer, and Ian Fitzsimmons
- ESPN box score, GoPSUsports.com box score

Game information

First quarter

- PSU – Nicholas Singleton, 5-yard TD run, Jake Pinegar kick, 0:07 (PSU, 7–0)

Second quarter

- UU – Thomas Yassmin, 1-yard TD pass from Cameron Rising, Jordan Noyes kick, 7:55 (TIE, 7–7)
- PSU – Mitchell Tinsley, 10-yard TD pass from Sean Clifford, Pinegar kick, 4:47 (PSU, 14–7)
- UU – Ja'Quinden Jackson, 19-yard TD run, Noyes kick, 2:38 (TIE, 14–14)

Third quarter

- PSU – Singleton, 87-yard TD run, Pinegar kick, 9:25 (PSU, 21–14)

Fourth quarter

- PSU – KeAndre Lambert-Smith, 88-yard TD pass from Clifford, Pinegar kick, 14:49 (PSU, 28–14)
- PSU – Kaytron Allen, 1-yard TD run, Pinegar kick, 10:36 (PSU, 35–14)
- UU – Jaylen Dixon, 5-yard TD pass from Bryson Barnes, Noyes kick, 0:25 (PSU, 35–21)

Statistics	PSU	UU
First downs	15	23
Plays–yards	53–448	83–391
Rushes–yards	31–169	43–184
Passing yards	279	207
Passing: comp–att–int	16–22–0	18–40–2
Turnovers		
Time of possession	24:47	35:13

Team	Category	Player	Statistics
Penn State	Passing	Sean Clifford	16/21, 279 yards, 2 TD
Penn State	Rushing	Nicholas Singleton	7 carries, 120 yards, 2 TD
Penn State	Receiving	KeAndre Lambert-Smith	3 receptions, 124 yards, TD
Utah	Passing	Bryson Barnes	10/19, 112 yards, TD, INT
Utah	Rushing	Ja'Quinden Jackson	13 carries, 81 yards, TD
Utah	Receiving	Devaughn Vele	5 receptions, 100 yards

== Roster ==
2022 Penn State Nittany Lions football team roster
Players
Coaches
Offense

Pos.	#	Name	Class
QB	14	Sean Clifford (C)	Sr
QB	15	Drew Allar	Fr
QB	11	Christian Veilleux	Fr
QB	9	Beau Pribula	Fr
RB	10	Nicholas Singleton	Fr
RB	13	Kaytron Allen	Fr
RB	24	Keyvone Lee	So
RB	28	Devyn Ford	Jr
RB	30	Amiel Davis	Fr
RB	34	Tyler Holzworth	Fr
RB	38	Tank Smith	Jr
WR	1	KeAndre Lambert-Smith	So
WR	3	Parker Washington (injured)	So
WR	5	Mitchell Tinsley	Sr
WR	6	Harrison Wallace III	Fr
WR	7	Kaden Saunders	Fr
WR	8	Tyler Johnson	Fr
WR	12	Anthony Ivey	Fr
WR	17	Mason Stahl	So
WR	18	Omari Evans	Fr
WR	19	Jaden Dottin	So
WR	40	Patrick Williams	Fr
WR	80	Malick Meiga	So
WR	81	Robert Rossi	Fr
WR	82	Liam Clifford	Fr
WR	83	Jake Spencer	So
WR	84	Jan Mahlert	Fr
WR	86	Jason Estrella	Fr
TE	16	Khalil Dinkins	Fr
TE	44	Tyler Warren	So
TE	84	Theo Johnson	So
TE	86	Brenton Strange	Jr
TE	87	Kolt Pearce	Fr
TE	88	Jerry Cross	Fr
TE	89	Grayson Kline	Sr
OL	51	Jimmy Christ	So
OL	53	Nick Dawkins	So
OL	57	Ibrahim Traore	So
OL	58	Landon Tengwall (injured)	Fr
OL	64	Hunter Nourzad	Sr
OL	66	Drew Shelton	Fr
OL	69	Ben Hartman	Fr
OL	70	Juice Scruggs (C)	Sr
OL	71	Vega Ioane	Fr
OL	72	Bryce Effner	Sr
OL	74	Olu Fashanu (injured)	So
OL	75	Matt Detisch	Fr
OL	77	Sal Wormley	Jr
OL	78	Golden Israel-Achumba	So
OL	79	Caedan Wallace	Jr

Defense

Pos.	#	Name	Class
CB	3	Johnny Dixon	Jr
CB	4	Kalen King	So
CB	5	Cam Miller	Fr
CB	8	Marquis Wilson	Jr
CB	9	Joey Porter Jr.	Jr
CB	13	Cristian Driver	Fr
CB	19	Xavier Copening	Fr
CB	24	Jeffrey Davis Jr.	Fr
CB	25	Daequan Hardy	Jr
CB	31	Kolin Dinkins	Fr
CB	35	Jace Tutty	Fr
CB	36	Stephen Ripka	Fr
DE	18	Davon Townley Jr.	Fr
DE	20	Adisa Isaac	Jr
DE	33	Dani Dennis-Sutton	Fr
DE	36	Zuriah Fisher	So
DE	44	Chop Robinson	So
DE	46	Nick Tarburton	Sr
DE	56	Amin Vanover	So
DE	90	Rodney McGraw	Fr
DE	92	Smith Vilbert	Jr
DE	94	Jake Wilson	So
DE	98	Andrew Sharga	So
DT	28	Zane Durant	Fr
DT	47	Alex Furmanek	Jr
DT	51	Hakeem Beamon	Jr
DT	52	Jordan van den Berg	Fr
DT	55	Fatorma Mulbah	So
DT	58	Kaleb Artis	Fr
DT	91	Dvon Ellies	Jr
DT	97	P. J. Mustipher (C)	Sr
DT	99	Coziah Izzard	So
LB	0	Jonathan Sutherland (C)	Sr
LB	11	Abdul Carter	Fr
LB	14	Tyrece Mills	So
LB	23	Curtis Jacobs	So
LB	27	Bobby Walchak	Fr
LB	32	Keon Wylie	Fr
LB	34	Dominic DeLuca	Fr
LB	39	Robbie Dwyer	Jr
LB	41	Kobe King	Fr
LB	42	Jamari Buddin	Fr
LB	42	Jackson Pryts	Fr
LB	43	Tyler Elsdon	So
LB	45	Charlie Katshir	Sr
LB	48	Cody Romano	Sr
LB	49	Ben Chizmar	Fr
S	2	Keaton Ellis	Jr
S	6	Zakee Wheatley	Fr
S	7	Jaylen Reed	So
S	10	Mekhi Flowers	Fr
S	16	Ji'Ayir Brown (C)	Sr
S	21	Kevin Winston Jr.	Fr
S	26	Jaden Seider	Jr
S	29	Sebastian Costantini	Jr
S	37	Trace Brown	Fr
S	39	Jashaun Green	Fr

Special teams

Pos.	#	Name	Class
K	92	Jake Pinegar	Sr
K	93	Sander Sahaydak	Fr
K	96	Mitchell Groh	Fr
P	96	Barney Amor	Sr
P	97	Alex Bacchetta	Fr
P	99	Gabriel Nwosu	Fr
LS	35	Blaise Sokach-Minnick	Fr
LS	48	Tyler Duzansky	Fr
LS	49	Michael Wright	So
LS	91	Chris Stoll (C)	Sr
LS/DE	47	Will Patton	Fr

Head coach

- James Franklin

Coordinators/assistant coaches

- Mike Yurcich (offensive coordinator / quarterbacks)
- Manny Diaz (defensive coordinator / linebackers)
- Stacy Collins (Special teams coordinator / Outside linebackers / Nickel)
- Terry Smith (Associate head coach / defensive recruiting coordinator / cornerbacks)
- Ty Howle (Tight ends)
- Anthony Poindexter (Co-defensive coordinator / safeties)
- Ja'Juan Seider (Co-offensive coordinator / running backs)
- Taylor Stubblefield (offensive recruiting coordinator / Wide receivers)
- Phil Trautwein (offensive line)
- Kevin Threlkel (Assistant AD / Chief of Staff)
- Andy Frank (Director of Player Personnel)
- Ben Kerr (Director of Football Administration)
- Chuck Losey III (Assistant AD / Performance Enhancement)
- Will Flaherty (Director of Player Development & Community Relations)

Legend

- (C) Team captain
- (S) Suspended
- (I) Ineligible
- Injured
- Redshirt

Roster
Last update: November 28, 2022

== Notes ==
Running back Devyn Ford appeared in the Penn State's first four games, before Franklin announced Ford would be leaving the team. Ford later transferred to Notre Dame after the season.

== Rankings ==
Ranking movements Legend: ██ Increase in ranking ██ Decrease in ranking RV = Received votes
	Week															
Poll	Pre	1	2	3	4	5	6	7	8	9	10	11	12	13	14	Final
AP	RV	RV	22	14	11	10	10	16	13	16	14	11	11	8	9	7
Coaches	RV	RV	23	15	12	10	10	16	13	16	15	12	10	7	7	7
CFP	Not released									15	14	11	11	8	11	Not released

== Players drafted into the NFL ==
Round	Pick	Player	Position	NFL club
2	32	Joey Porter Jr.	CB	Pittsburgh Steelers
2	61	Brenton Strange	TE	Jacksonville Jaguars
2	62	Juice Scruggs	C	Houston Texans
3	87	Ji'Ayir Brown	S	San Francisco 49ers
5	149	Sean Clifford	QB	Green Bay Packers
6	185	Parker Washington	WR	Jacksonville Jaguars
