= Medina Municipal Airport =

- IATA: none; ICAO: none; FAA LID: 1G5

Summary
- Airport type: Public
- Owner/Operator: City of Medina
- Serves: Medina, Ohio
- Location: Medina County, Ohio
- Time zone: UTC−05:00 (-5)
  - Summer (DST): UTC−04:00 (-4)
- Elevation AMSL: 1,190 ft (360 m)
- Coordinates: 41°07′53.2″N 081°45′53.7″W

Map
- Location of airport in Ohio 1G5 (the United States)

Runways
Direction	Length		Surface
Direction	ft	m	Surface
01/19	2,867	874	Asphalt
09/27	3,556	1,084	Asphalt

Statistics (2020)
- Aircraft operations: 79,685
- Based aircraft: 54
- Source: Federal Aviation Administration

Medina Municipal Airport (FAA LID: 1G5) is a public use airport in Medina County, Ohio, United States. It is owned by the City of Medina and is located four nautical miles (7.41 km) east of the city's central business district. According to the FAA's National Plan of Integrated Airport Systems for 2007-2011, it is categorized as a reliever airport.

Although most U.S. airports use the same three-letter location identifier for the FAA and IATA, this airport is assigned 1G5 by the FAA but has no designation from the IATA.

The airport houses a flying club sponsored by NASA.

== History ==
Construction of Freedom Field on 114 acres (46 ha) was announced in January 1958. However, this immediately raised questions of zoning. By mid July 1959, two 10-unit t-hangars were being completed. A glider club was being established at the airport in August 1963.

A report to be made to the county commissioners in April 1966 proposed the creation of an airport authority. It also recommended the county purchase the field as this would enable it to be eligible for a state grant. A similar suggestion for it to become a municipal airport was made to the Medina city council in January 1967. Fearful that Wadsworth Municipal Airport would be allocated the money, before the month was up the mayor had been given the go-ahead to make a bid for the airport and it had been approved by the state department of aviation. Despite the effort, the funds were indeed assigned to Wadsworth four days later.

Remodeling of the airport began in late August 1968 shortly after a new airport manager took over. Three months later, both a north-south, as well as an east-west runway were planned. Two new partners were also brought onboard to the company that ran the airport. By 1970, it was being suggested as a location for a "jetport" for northeast Ohio.

Due to financial difficulties, in mid February 1974 a group of pilots asked the county to consider purchasing the airport. The county commissioners announced their intention to pursue a federal grant to purchase the airport in mid August 1976. The grant was approved in late January 1977. However, while the Akron National Bank and Trust was permitted to foreclose on the property, its sale was blocked in mid February. A group of citizens sued to prevent the county from buying the airport by April. Less than a week after a hearing, the county commissioners voted to acquire the field. However, a preliminary injunction against the sale was issued in late May. The FAA grant was changed in July to increase the amount of the total that could be used to purchase the airport, eliminating the need for the county to borrow money. BancOhio bought the 290-acre (120 ha) airport in late December 1979 from a sheriff's auction. In 1980, residents asked the FAA not to disburse a grant that could be used to expand the airport.

A lawsuit to prevent the sale of the airport to Cleveland was filed in mid November 1983. Instead of being acquired by the city, the airport was purchased by John C. Lehmann in October 1984. Lehman, who had fled East Germany in 1950, pledged not to enlarge the airport to assuage the concerns of nearby residents. In late January 1985, the county commissioners announced a plan to issue bonds to support a three phase development of the airport.

Medina purchased the airport by mid 1987 and by early August of the following year, it had been renamed Medina Municipal Airport. By early October 1990, the airport was in the middle of a dispute with a local resident over an attempt to obtain land via eminent domain. The city voted to buy approximately 14 acres (5.7 ha) of land south of a runway in mid May 1991. Another 6 acres (2.4 ha) west of the main runway was acquired in an out-of-court settlement in late April 1992. By late August 1995, the city had received multiple proposals to develop the land north of the east-west runway.

Parking spaces were expanded at the airport in 2013 when a helicopter based at the airport began taking up half of the parking space the Federal Aviation Administration recommends the airport has. The airport received a $90,315 federal grant in 2015 to improve efficiency and safety at the airport. It funded rehabilitation of an aircraft parking apron.

The airport received a $168,750 grant from the Federal Aviation Administration in 2022 to update its master plan and layout. The airport was also considering purchasing 30 acres (12 ha) of land to build additional corporate hangars, a maintenance facility and a 400-foot (120 m) runway extension. The airport was the center of controversy the same year when it was found that a 17-year-old airport worker had organized a supercar photoshoot at the airport. Cars were taken onto the airport's runway and driven at high speeds, even as aircraft were taking off and landing.

Cold Stream Air Maintenance opened a new building at the airport in May 2025. The city created an airport manager position that November and applied for a grant to build a new hangar the following month.

== Facilities and aircraft ==
Medina Municipal Airport covers an area of 283 acres (115 ha) at an elevation of 1,190 feet (363 m) above mean sea level. It has two asphalt runways designated 01/19, with a surface measuring 2,867 x 60 feet (874 x 18 m), and 09/27, with a surface measuring 3,556 x 75 feet (1,084 x 23 m).

For the 12-month period ending September 23, 2020, the airport had 79,685 aircraft operations, an average of 218 per day: 98% general aviation, 2% air taxi, and a few military and ultralight. At that time, there were 54 aircraft based at this airport: 49 single-engine and three multi-engine airplanes, as well as two helicopters.

The airport has a fixed-base operator that sells fuel and offers amenities such as general maintenance, avionics services, a conference room, a crew lounge, and snooze rooms.

== Accidents and incidents ==
- On 1 May 1961, a two-seat light airplane crashed after taking off from the airport, seriously injuring the pilot.
- On 19 September 1995, a Grumman airplane crashed while attempting to make an emergency landing at the airport following an engine failure.
- On October 27, 1999, a Cessna 210L was destroyed during an attempted landing at the Medina Municipal Airport. According to one witness, the airplane initially approached Runway 27 at Medina and made a low approach "not more than 20 feet above the runway." The airplane then climbed, circled at "no more than 500 feet," and entered a left downwind for Runway 36. It turned towards the runway for landing, then descended where the witness lost sight of it. The witness further stated that at no time did the engine sound abnormal. Another witness said that the aircraft hit electrical transmission wires on final approach and "came down immediately." A flight instructor in another airplane on the ground observed the airplane descend below the approach end of Runway 36. He wasn't sure of what he was seeing due to the low, twilight visibility, but then observed a blue flash of light. The probable cause of the accident was found to be the pilot's failure to maintain proper altitude during the final approach segment of the visual approach.
- On September 25, 2001, a Piper PA-32 Cherokee Six was substantially damaged during a forced landing after take-off from Medina Municipal Airport. The pilot reported that the plane had 60 gallons of fuel onboard and that the aircraft's engine runup seemed fine. After takeoff, the engine "popped" and quit, and smoke began emanating from the left side of the engine. A witness reported seeing the airplane was too low before impacting the ground, and that they could not hear the airplane's engine running. The probable cause of the accident was found to be fatigue failure of the dual magneto mounting flanges that resulted from undetected contact damage sustained during a previous installation, which resulted in its separation from the engine during take-off.
- On March 26, 2003, a Cessna 150G impacted a hangar and two parked airplanes at the Medina Municipal Airport. After startup, the pilot said that the engine began to "race," and the airplane "lunged" forward. Though the pilot closed both the throttle and the mixture and applied brakes, the aircraft continued to roll forwards. The pilot used rudder to attempt to steer the plane away from the hangar, but the right wing contacted the corner of the building, and the airplane spun to the right and impacted two parked airplanes before coming to a stop. An engine run on the aircraft by a mechanic after the accident found that the brakes alone held the aircraft stationary. The probable cause of the accident was found to be the pilot's failure to follow published procedures while starting the engine, and his failure to maintain control of the airplane.
- On September 10, 2004, a Cessna 172M was substantially damaged during an aborted takeoff at the Medina Municipal Airport. While performing his fourth takeoff of the day, the pilot said the aircraft was "slow to lift," and he decided he could not safely climb above the wires at the end of the runway. The pilot subsequently reduced power to idle, applied the brakes, and extended the flaps; however, the airplane still traveled off the end of the runway, impacted a fence, and nosed over into a ditch. A witness at the airport reported hearing a change of engine power during the airplane's takeoff roll, followed by the sound of tires "squealing on the pavement" before the aircraft overran the runway. Investigation of the engine found the number 3 cylinder was providing low compression due to a fractured cylinder ring. The probable cause of the accident was found to be the partial loss of engine power due to inadequate maintenance and by failure to comply with service instruction for low engine compression.
- On July 7, 2005, a Cessna 421B was substantially damaged while landing at Medina Municipal Airport. Approximately 30 minutes into the flight, the pilot decided to return to the airport due to a high oil temperature indication on the left engine. The pilot used the VOR instrument approach to runway 27. He extended the landing gear at the final approach fix and noted a "3 green" landing gear indication, which was confirmed just prior to touchdown. The aircraft touched down normally, but the left wing subsequently dropped toward the ground, and the airplane began to veer left. The airplane traveled off the left side of the runway, struck a ditch, and came to rest upright. The probable cause of the accident was found to be an overload failure of the left main landing gear attachment assembly.
- On December 13, 2005, a Mendenhall Lancair 235 impacted a snow bank situated alongside the runway and subsequently nosed over at the Medina Municipal Airport. After touching down on the snow-contaminated runway, the aircraft "immediately began drifting toward the left side of the runway”. The pilot attempted to correct for the drift using right rudder but "lost directional control" and departed off the left side of the runway. The probable cause of the accident was found to be the pilot's failure to maintain directional control during landing due to an icy runway.
- On July 20, 2011, a Beech C35 Bonanza experienced a total loss of engine power after takeoff from Medina Municipal Airport. Though the flight instructor attempted to return to the airport, they instead made a forced landing 400 feet from the runway. The pilots onboard had been practicing takeoffs and landings on an instructional flight when the engine lost power about 200 feet above ground level. The probable cause of the accident was found to be the loss of engine power due to fuel starvation due to an age-related failure of the engine-driven fuel pump. Also causal was the failure of the maintenance facility to overhaul the fuel pump and the failure of the operator to ensure that the pump was overhauled.
- On October 8, 2017, a Cessna 150 flown by a student pilot landed hard, bounced, and porpoised before coming to rest on the runway, causing substantial damage to the engine mounts. The probable cause of the accident was found to be the student pilot's improper landing flare, which resulted in a hard landing and porpoise.

== See also ==
- List of airports in Ohio
