= Wadsworth Municipal Airport =

Public use airport in Wadsworth, Ohio

- IATA: none; ICAO: none; FAA LID: 3G3

Summary
- Owner: City of Wadsworth Airport Commission
- Operator: Flight Services of Wadsworth
- Serves: Wadsworth, Ohio
- Location: Medina County, Ohio
- Time zone: UTC−05:00 (-5)
  - Summer (DST): UTC−04:00 (-4)
- Elevation AMSL: 974 ft (297 m)
- Coordinates: 41°00′07″N 081°45′18″W

Map
- Location of airport in Ohio 3G3 (the United States)

Runways
Direction	Length		Surface
Direction	ft	m	Surface
2/20	3,530	1,076	Asphalt
10/28	2,155	656	Asphalt

Statistics (2020)
- Aircraft movements: 42,340
- Source: Federal Aviation Administration

Wadsworth Municipal Airport (FAA LID: 3G3) is a publicly owned, public use airport located 2 miles southwest of Wadsworth, Ohio, United States, in Medina County. The airport sits on 183 acres at an elevation of 974 feet.

The airport is host to Balloons Over Wadsworth, a regular balloon festival that, besides a balloon show, provides educational opportunities for youth and adults in aviation- and STEM-related areas.

== History ==
The Wadsworth Municipal Airport was established in 1954 and opened in mid 1955. The airport and its 3,300-foot (1,000 m) runway were dedicated on 11 September 1960. Lighting had been installed on the runway by late January 1962.

A 364-acre (147 ha) industrial park was proposed on the airport's northern edge in November 1965. The following year, the airport's runway was reduced to 1,800 feet (550 m) due to the relocation of State Route 94. As a result, additional land was purchased for a northeast-southwest runway to replace it. The project was aided by the awarding of a $100,000 state grant to the airport in early 1967 for the construction of a new runway. By early June, contracts to build the runway and a taxiway had been awarded, but work was delayed by a strike. Construction was able to resume the following week and a 3,525-by-75-foot (1,074 m × 23 m) north-south runway was dedicated on 24 September 1967.

The airport received a $50,000 grant in February 1971 to construct an administration building and replace the airport beacon. Plans to build additional hangars were being made in January 1972.

A proposal to build a new 4,300-foot (1,300 m) runway was under consideration in 1992.

In 2000, the Wadsworth Airport Association relinquished operational control of the airport after 45 years as it required too much effort for a volunteer organization.

In 2012, the airport considered purchasing adjacent land for further expansion and development. One of the parcels was vacant, while the other already housed an aircraft hangar.

In 2020, an aircraft formation performed a ceremonial low pass at the airport to mark the completion of improvements for the airport's secondary runway as well as to honor first responders during the fight against the COVID-19 pandemic.

Upgrades to runway 2/20 were completed in 2022 to seal cracks on the runway. After receiving federal funding for the project in 2019, a ten-year master plan was submitted to the FAA in 2023. In 2024, following the expiration of a 40-year lease and several years of no deal being reached, the city vacated 27 hangars.

== Facilities and aircraft ==
The airport has two runways, both paved with asphalt. Runway 2/20 measures 3,530 x 75 ft (1076 x 23 m) and runway 10/28 measures 2155 x 35 ft (657 x 11 m). In the 12-month period ending October 15, 2020, the airport had 42,340 aircraft operations, an average of 116 per day. This includes 99% general aviation, 1% air taxi, and <1% military. For the same time period, 102 aircraft were based at the airport, including 91 single-engine and 7 multi-engine airplanes as well as 4 gliders.

The airport has a fixed-base operator that offers fuel, both avgas and jet fuel, and amenities such as general maintenance, courtesy transportation, a conference room, a crew lounge, snooze rooms, showers, and more.

Since 2016, the airport is home to Avit Flight Academy offering aircraft rentals and training ranging from the private pilot certificate through multi-engine and flight instruction certification. Headquartered at 3G3, the flight school also operates out of MFD, AKR, CAK, BJJ, and 1G5 Avit Flight Academy has an authorized Cirrus Training Center at the Akron-Canton Airport location.

== Accidents and incidents ==
- On 2 June 1990, a Piper Cherokee ran into a utility wire while landing at the airport, killing the two occupants.
- On 28 June 1993, a replica Nieuport crashed into a hangar roof at the airport, killing the pilot.
- On 6 May 1998, a Cessna 150L crashed while attempting to land at the airport, injuring the pilot.
- On May 31, 2016, a Piper PA-24 Comanche was substantially damaged while landing at the Wadsworth Municipal Airport. A flight instructor onboard requested the pilot to make a power-off approach as part of a Biennial Flight Review. On the base leg, it was determined that they would not reach the runway, and power was added so that a normal landing could be completed. On short final, the flight instructor called for more power to be added, which resulted in a pitch up attitude. Subsequently, the pilot reacted by pitching the airplane's nose down, but he inadvertently also reduced power to idle. The airplane continued to sink and touched down in the grass a few feet prior to the runway threshold, which resulted in a collision with the runway threshold. The probable cause of the accident was found to be the pilot's inadvertent power reduction during landing, which resulted in a runway undershoot, collision with the runway threshold, nose and right main landing gear collapse, and runway excursion.
- On January 11, 2018, a Socata MS893 was substantially damaged during a forced landing at Wadsworth Municipal Airport. The pilot noticed a loss of engine power while on approach to Wadsworth. Following unsuccessful attempts to restore engine power, the pilot executed a forced landing, during which the airplane impacted trees and damaged both wings. The probable cause of the accident was found to be the pilot's failure to apply carburetor heat during the approach, which resulted in a loss of engine power due to carburetor icing.
- On September 3, 2021, an aircraft crashed into a pond after takeoff from the Wadsworth Municipal Airport. Ohio State Highway Patrol reported the aircraft had been in contact with air traffic control and may have experienced mechanical problems. A witness reported hearing the aircraft would attempt to return due to a canopy problem.
- On September 18, 2021, an experimentally-built Rans S-20 Raven crashed shortly after takeoff from Wadsworth Municipal Airport. While departing, the plane's nose struck the runway, causing it to flip on its top and catch fire. The aircraft was departing after another helicopter had just landed; after becoming airborne, the accident airplane entered a steep roll and impacted the runway. The pilot was declared dead at the scene, and a blood toxicology found ethanol present. The probable cause of the crash was found to be the pilot's decision to depart shortly after a landing helicopter, which resulted in an encounter with the helicopter's wake turbulence and a loss of airplane control. Contributing to the accident was the pilot's impairment by his recent use of ethanol.

== See also ==
- List of airports in Ohio
