= Medina City School District =

School district in Ohio

Location
- United States

District information
- Type: Public
- Motto: Recognizing Potential - Maximizing Achievement
- Grades: Pre K - 12
- Superintendent: Aaron Sable
- Schools: Seven Elementary Schools; Two Middle Schools; One High School; One Alternative School; One Preschool

Students and staff
- Students: 7,500 (2016-2017)
- Athletic conference: Northeast Ohio Conference
- District mascot: Battling Bees, or Bees
- Colors: Green and white also yellow

Other information
- Website: www.medinabees.org

The Medina City Schools is a school district in Medina County, Ohio. The oldest school in the district is Garfield Elementary School until closing in at the end of the 2023-2024 school year.

== Schools ==
The district includes the following Medina, Ohio schools:

School	Type	Grades
A.I. Root Middle School	Middle school	6–8
Claggett Middle School	Middle school	6–8
Ella Canavan Elementary	Elementary school	K–5
Eliza Northrop Elementary	Elementary school	K–5
Evolve Academy	Alternative school for kids with behavioral needs	K–12
H.G. Blake Elementary	Elementary school	K–5
Helping Hands Preschool at Heritage	Preschool for children aged 3–5 with disabilities	Preschool
Medina High School	High school	9–12
Ralph E. Waite Elementary	Elementary school	K–5
Sidney Fenn Elementary	Elementary school	K–5
