= Amos Root =

American beekeeping innovator

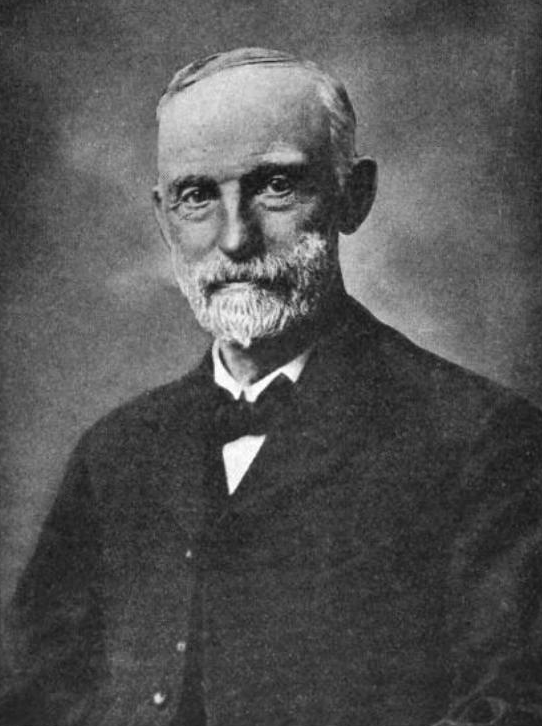
- Born: Amos Ives Root; December 9, 1839; Medina, Ohio
- Died: April 30, 1923 (aged 83); Medina, Ohio
- Occupations: Entrepreneur, inventor, author
- Known for: Beekeeping innovations; witnessed and reported early Wright brothers flights
- Notable work: The ABC of Bee Culture (1879)

Amos Ives Root (1839–1923) was an Ohio entrepreneur who developed innovative techniques for beekeeping during the late 19th century, when the practice played an important role in the economy of many communities in the U.S. He founded his own company, which continues in business to the present day.

His wide-ranging interests and curiosity led him to become the only eyewitness to publish articles about successful airplane flights made by the Wright brothers in Ohio in 1904–1905.

== Early life and career ==
Amos Root was born in Medina, Ohio on December 9, 1839. He began working as a jewelry manufacturer and took up beekeeping in his 20s as a hobby. Among his major contributions was a method to harvest honey without destroying the beehive. He became a nationally and internationally known expert and a wealthy businessman.

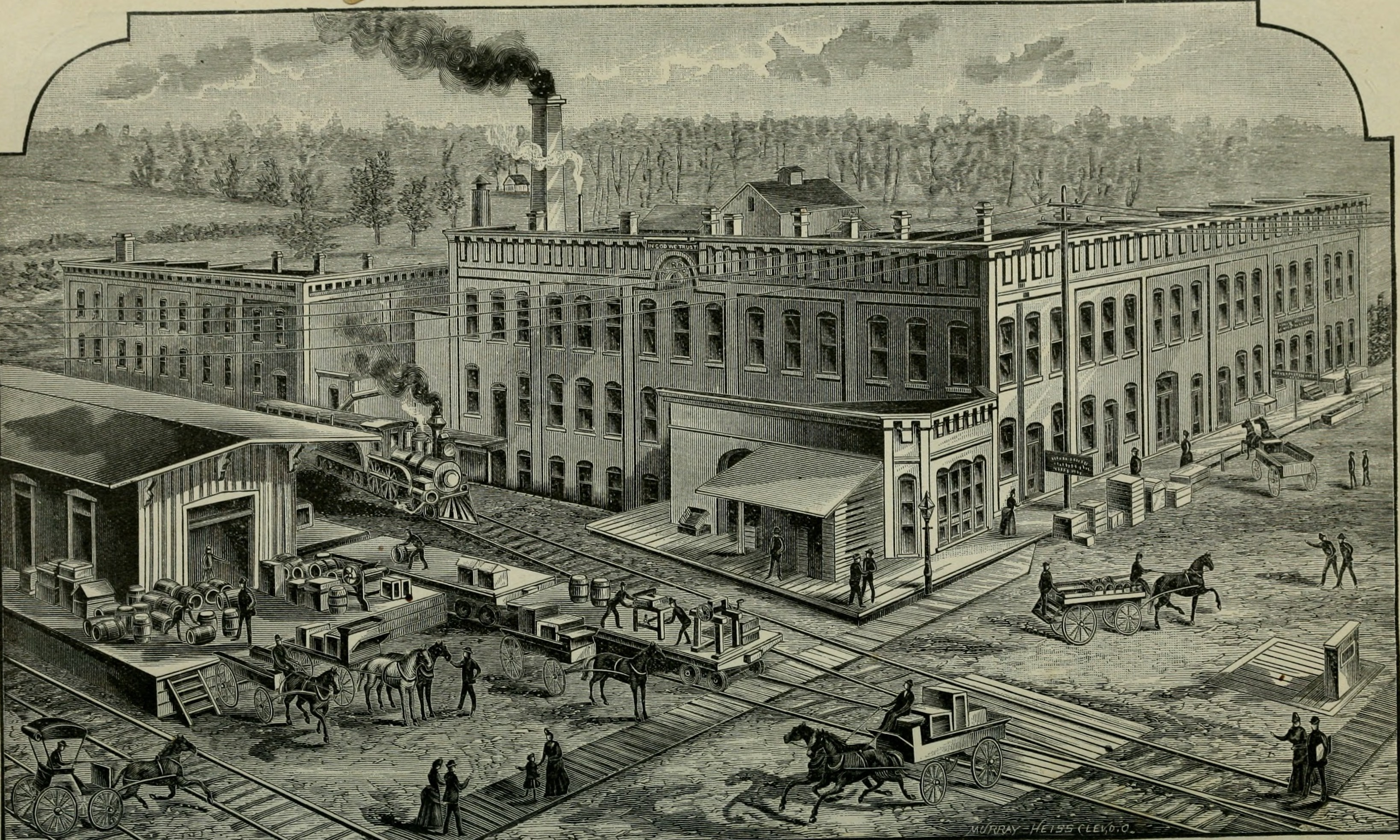
AI Root factory, as depicted in The ABC of Bee Culture.

Root founded his company in 1869 in his hometown of Medina, to manufacture beehives and beekeeping equipment. At the peak of its business, the company was shipping four railroad freight cars of beekeeping equipment a day.

Root held strong Christian beliefs and wrote about his ideas and observations of contemporary society in a trade publication he started, Gleanings in Bee Culture. His book, ABC of Bee Culture was published in 1879 and continues to be updated in the present day as The ABC and XYZ of Bee Culture.

During Root's tenure, a piano was installed at the factory and employee breaks were mandated. During the break, hymns were sung and employees were prohibited from visiting the nearby tavern.

In the late 1890s, Root's company started selling beekeeping equipment produced by competitor Dadant and Sons, Inc. The venture was unsuccessful and was discontinued. In 1928, the company began a transition into candle-making when a local priest made a request for high-quality liturgical candles. The production of beekeeping equipment was reduced and eventually phased out.

The company, now known as Root Candles, is still owned by the Root family and is run by his great-great grandson.

The company's influence in its hometown is seen in the name of A.I. Root Middle school and the Medina High School mascot: the "Battling Bees".

== Visiting the Wrights ==
Always eager to learn about new technology, Root took great interest in the Wright brothers after reading sketchy newspaper reports about their 1903 Kitty Hawk flights and experiments in early 1904 in Ohio.

He combined his curiosity about flying machines with his enthusiasm for another recent invention, the automobile, and drove his 1903 model Oldsmobile runabout nearly 200 miles on primitive roads from Medina to the Wright hometown, Dayton, Ohio, hoping to learn more about the flying experiments. On September 20, 1904, he saw Wilbur Wright fly the first complete circle in an airplane. He wrote an article about the achievement for his Gleanings periodical, but delayed publishing the story until the following January at the request of the Wrights. He apparently saw several other flights, as well. His report and follow-ups he wrote were the only published eyewitness accounts of successful flights by the Wright brothers at Huffman Prairie, a pasture outside Dayton, where the brothers developed the first practical airplane. Root offered his reports to Scientific American magazine, but received no reply. His writing suggested the Wrights' invention would cause profound changes:

...these brothers have probably not even a faint glimpse of what their discovery is going to bring to the children of men. No one living can give a guess of what is coming along this line, much better than any one living could conjecture the final outcome of Columbus' experiment....

— Gleanings in Bee Culture, January 1, 1905

== Helen Keller friendship ==
Root became interested in advances in educating blind and deaf children, and contributed to that effort. In response, he received a four-page letter from Helen Keller thanking him for his kindness and support. He remained friends with her for the rest of his life.

== Later life ==
In the last 25 years of his life, Root became a devout Christian. He donated $500 toward the creation of the Anti-Saloon League on the recommendation his son Ernest Rob Root, who was attending Oberlin College with Howard Hyde Russell, later a clergyman and founder of the League.

Amos Root died in Medina, Ohio on April 30, 1923.
