= Mike Yurcich =

American football coach (born 1975)

Current position
- Title: Offensive coordinator
- Team: Youngstown State
- Conference: MVFC

Biographical details
- Born: November 5, 1975 (age 50); Euclid, Ohio, U.S.
- Education: PennWest California (1999); Indiana University Bloomington (2004)

Playing career
- 1996–1998: California (PA)
- Position: Quarterback

Coaching career (HC unless noted)
- 1999: Saint Francis (IN) (RB)
- 2000–2001: Saint Francis (IN) (QB)
- 2002: Saint Francis (IN) (OC/QB)
- 2003–2004: Indiana (GA)
- 2005: Edinboro (QB/WR)
- 2006–2010: Edinboro (OC/QB/WR)
- 2011–2012: Shippensburg (OC/QB)
- 2013–2018: Oklahoma State (OC/QB)
- 2019: Ohio State (PGC/QB)
- 2020: Texas (OC/QB)
- 2021–2023: Penn State (OC/QB)
- 2025–present: Youngstown State (OC)

Mike Yurcich (born November 5, 1975) is an American football coach who serves as offensive coordinator at Youngstown State. Prior to going to Youngstown State, he was the offensive coordinator at the University of Texas at Austin in 2020 and at Penn State University from 2021 to 2023. He was the passing game coordinator and quarterbacks coach at the Ohio State University for the 2019 season. Yurcich was the offensive coordinator at Oklahoma State University from 2013 to 2018. He was previously the offensive coordinator and quarterbacks coach at Saint Francis, Edinboro, and Shippensburg. Yurcich also spent time at Indiana as a graduate assistant.

Some of the prominent players Yurcich has helped develop include Trevor Harris, Zach Zulli, J. W. Walsh, Mason Rudolph, Taylor Cornelius, Justin Fields, Sam Ehlinger, Sean Clifford, and Drew Allar.

== Early life and education ==
Yurcich earned a degree in psychology at PennWest California in 1999. He spent three seasons as the school's starting quarterback and was a two-year captain. and a master's degree in education from St. Francis, where he picked up a school counseling license. He began his playing career at Mount Union College.

== Coaching career ==
On January 8, 2021, Yurcich was named the offensive coordinator and quarterbacks coach at Penn State.

Yurcich (YER-sitch), has 22 years of collegiate coaching experience, including 15 as an offensive coordinator, joins the Nittany Lions after spending the 2020 season at Texas as the offensive coordinator and quarterbacks coach. In his career as an FBS offensive coordinator, Yurcich's offenses have averaged 6.49 yards per play, which ranks first among OC's since 2013 and 14.03 yards per completion, which is first among Power Five OC's in that timeframe. Since 2013, Yurcich's offenses have scored 50 or more points 26 times and 40 or more points 51 times (50 percent of games coached), both of which are tops among FBS offensive coordinators since 2013. His teams average 61.5 touchdowns per year. In November 2023, after a loss to the University of Michigan, Yurcich was fired as Penn State's Offensive Coordinator. Yurcich was in his third season with the program.

On January 7, 2025, Yurcich was hired as the offensive coordinator for the Youngstown State Penguins.
