= Medina High School (Ohio) =

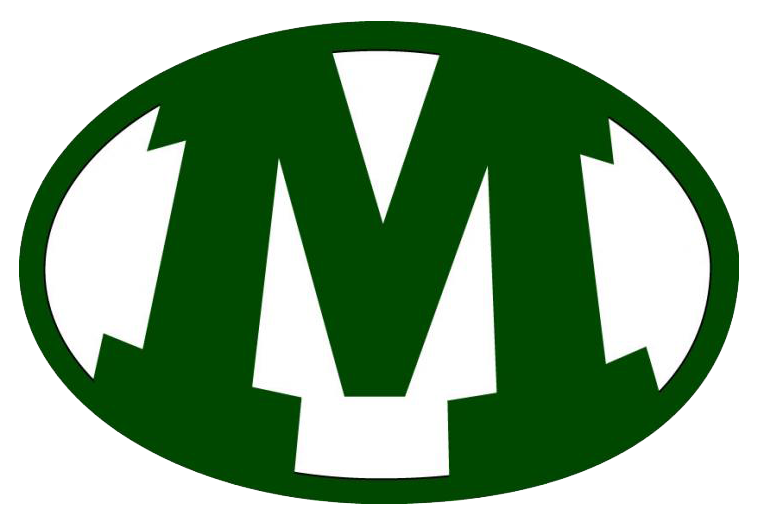

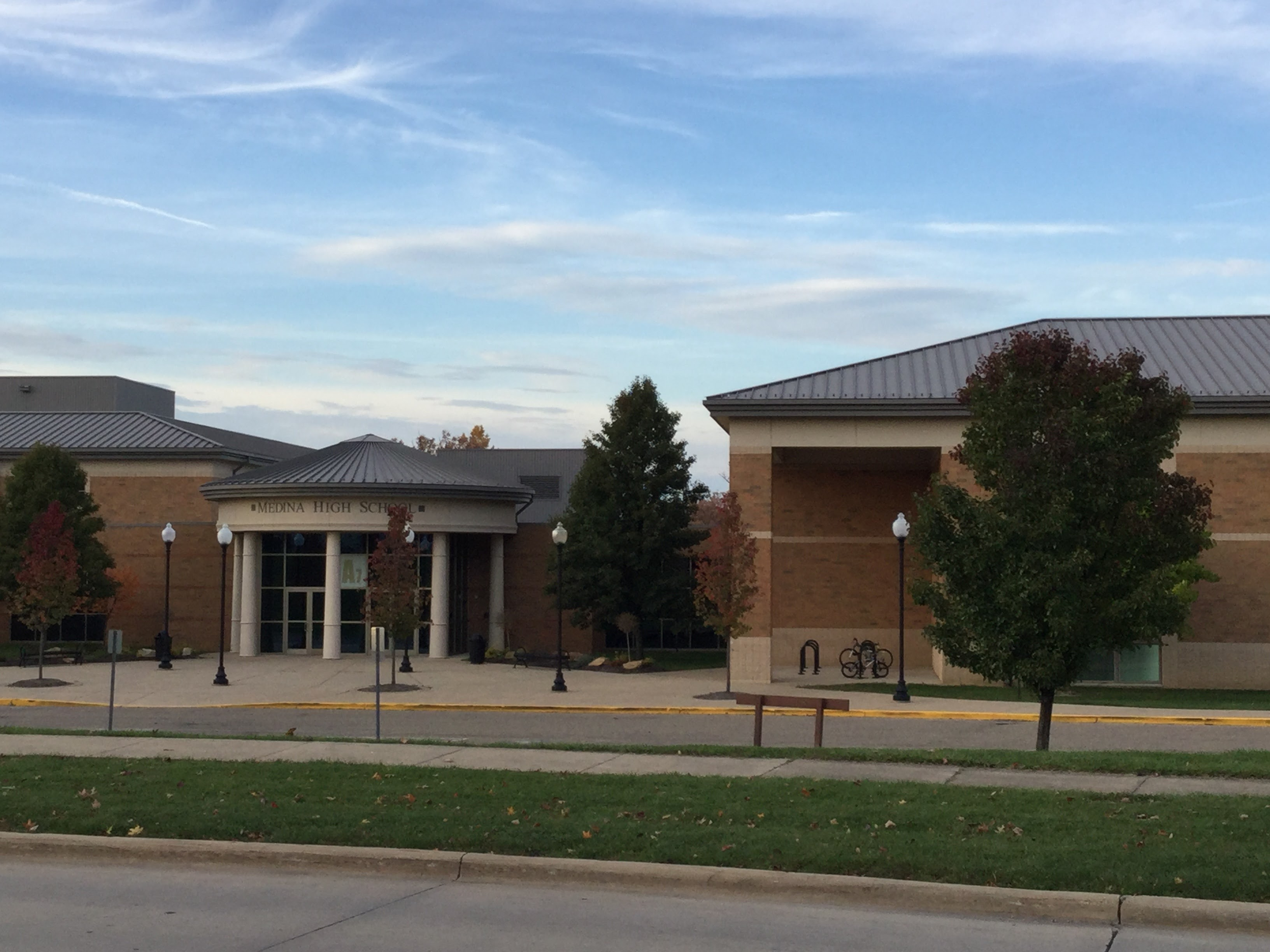
- Front entrance of Medina High School

Location
- 777 East Union Street; Medina, Ohio 44256; United States; 41.145°N 81.851°W

Information
- Type: Public
- Motto: Every Student Every Day
- Established: 1872
- School district: Medina City School District
- Principal: Elisa Tedona
- Teaching staff: 104.21 (FTE)
- Grades: 9–12
- Enrollment: 1,767 (2024–2025)
- Student to teacher ratio: 16.96
- Campus type: Suburban
- Colors: Green and gold
- Athletics: Suburban League, National Conference
- Nickname: The Battling Bees, or Bees
- Newspaper: The Medinamite
- Website: www.medinabees.org

Medina High School is a public high school located in Medina, Ohio, United States. It is the only high school in the Medina City School District. Athletic teams are known as the Bees, and they compete as a member of the Ohio High School Athletic Association in the Suburban League, National Conference.

== History ==
Medina High School was established in 1872 and was located in the Lincoln School, at the corner of South Broadway Street and East Smith Road. This building served as the high school until 1924, when a new building was built on North Broadway Street. This building served as the high school until 1956 and is now the Medina County Administration Building. A new building and campus opened that year at 420 East Union Street. This campus served as the home of Medina High School until the current campus, located at 777 East Union Street, opened in 1973 and since then has served as Claggett Middle School.

In 2004, a renovation and expansion project was completed which saw the additions of a new community recreation center and a performing arts center and doubled the building size to accommodate the larger enrollment numbers.

== Extracurricular activities ==
=== Performing arts ===
The school has an extensive performing arts program, with multiple choirs and orchestras, as well as several concert band programs. The Medina Performing Arts Center seats a total of 1,125 people.

=== Marching band ===
In addition to the school's concert bands, the Medina High School Marching Band (also known as "The Medina Musical Bees") is a competitive marching band that performs halftime shows for the school's varsity football team, as well as competes in several Ohio Music Education Association adjudicated performances each year. The band has won many awards, including a streak of "Superior" ratings at state competition from 2002 to 2024.

== Athletics ==
=== OHSAA State championships ===
- Girls' soccer – 1997, 2009
- Boys' cross country – 2007
- Boys' soccer – 2018

=== Non-OHSAA sanctioned state championships ===
- Boys' lacrosse – 2003
- Girls' lacrosse – 2010, 2011, 2012

== Notable alumni ==
- Drew Allar, class of 2022, NFL player for the Pittsburgh Steelers
- Matt Amodio, class of 2009, mathematician and gameshow contestant
- William G. Batchelder, class of 1960, former speaker of the Ohio House of Representatives
- John Nelson, class of 2017, professional soccer player in Major League Soccer (MLS)
- Matthew Patrick, class of 2005, social media influencer known as "MatPat"
- Fremont O. Phillips, class of 1874, former congressman in U.S. House of Representatives
- Clay Pickering, former professional football player in the National Football League (NFL), attended MHS his freshman year
- Bobby Rahal, class of 1971, professional race car driver
- Mason Schreck, class of 2012, former professional football player in the NFL
- Jon Teske, class of 2016, former professional basketball player in the National Basketball Association (NBA)
