= Zane Durant =

American football player (born 2004)

No. 92 – Buffalo Bills
- Position: Defensive tackle
- Roster status: Injured reserve

Personal information
- Born: May 6, 2004 (age 22); Plant City, Florida, U.S.
- Listed height: 6 ft 1 in (1.85 m)
- Listed weight: 290 lb (132 kg)

Career information
- High school: Lake Nona (Lake Nona, Orlando, Florida)
- College: Penn State (2022–2025)
- NFL draft: 2026: 5th round, 181st overall pick

Career history
- Buffalo Bills (2026–present)
- Stats at Pro Football Reference

Zane Marquis Alexander Durant (born May 6, 2004) is an American professional football defensive tackle for the Buffalo Bills of the National Football League (NFL). He played college football for the Penn State Nittany Lions and was selected by the Bills in the fifth round of the 2026 NFL draft.

== Early life ==
Durant was born in Plant City, Florida. His sports career began by playing soccer, basketball, and flag football at the Plant City Parks and Recreation Center before moving to Orlando, Florida with his family in 2009. Durant attended Lake Nona High School in Lake Nona, Orlando, Florida. He set the school record with 24.5 career sacks and single-season sack record with 15.5, which he had as a senior in 2021. He was named the team MVP in 2020 and the Defensive Player of the Year in 2019 and 2020. Durant committed to Penn State University to play college football.

== College career ==
Durant played in 13 games as a true freshman at Penn State in 2022 and had five tackles and one sack. As a sophomore in 2023, he started 11 of 13 games, recording 17 tackles and two sacks. He returned to Penn State in 2024 as a starter.

== Professional career ==
Pre-draft measurables
Height	Weight	Arm length	Hand span	Wingspan	40-yard dash	10-yard split	20-yard split	Vertical jump	Broad jump
6 ft 1 1/8 in (1.86 m)	290 lb (132 kg)	31 7/8 in (0.81 m)	10 5/8 in (0.27 m)	6 ft 5 7/8 in (1.98 m)	4.75 s	1.66 s	2.74 s	33.5 in (0.85 m)	9 ft 4 in (2.84 m)
All values from NFL Combine

Durant was selected by the Buffalo Bills in the fifth round with the 181st pick of the 2026 NFL draft. He was placed on injured reserve due to a neck stinger injury on August 30, 2026.
