= Medina, Ohio =

City in Medina County, Ohio

- City
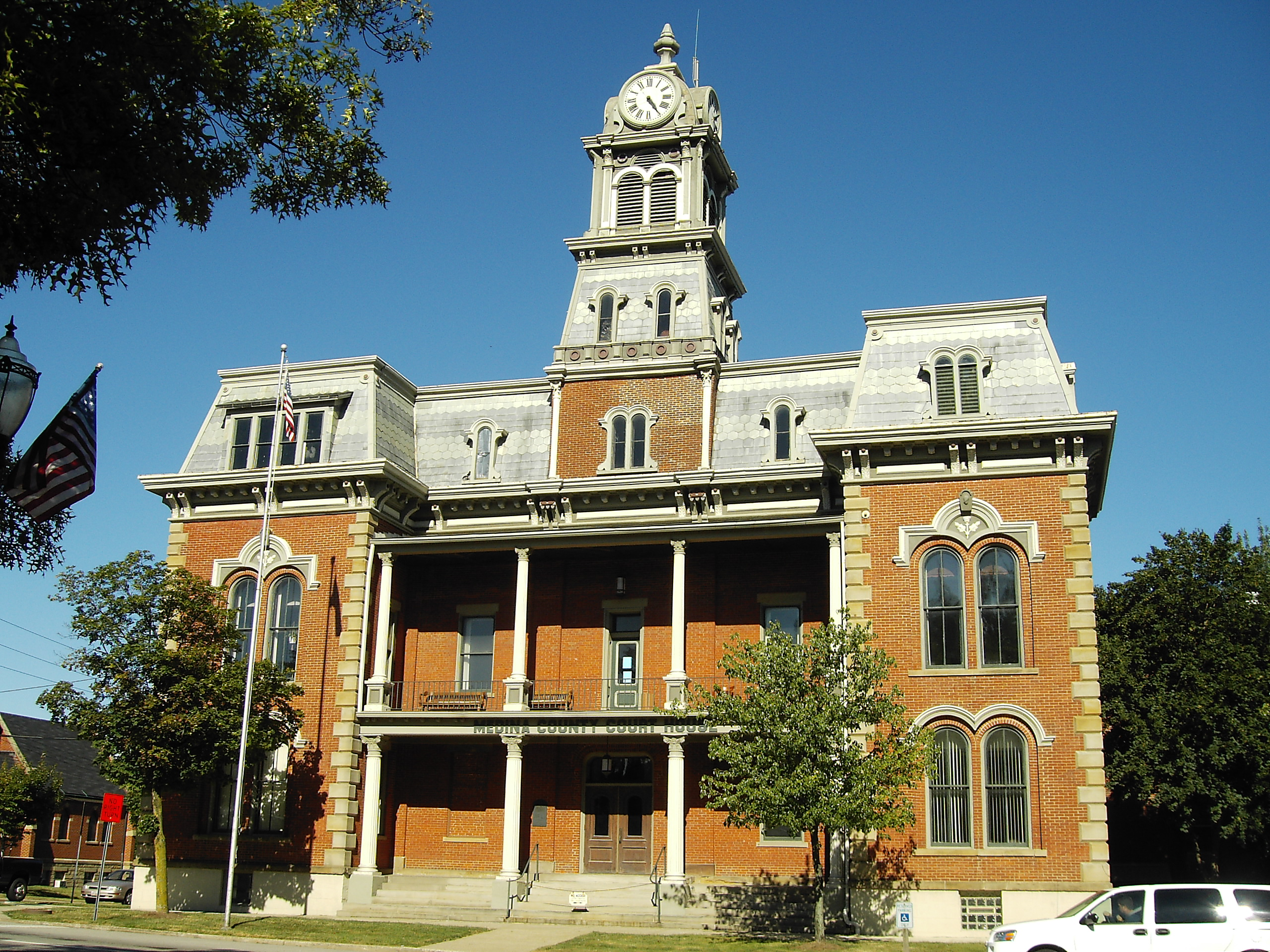
- Old Medina County Courthouse
- Motto: "Preserving the Past. Forging the Future."
- Interactive map of Medina, Ohio
- Location within Ohio Location within the United States
- Coordinates: 41°07′50″N 81°52′30″W
- Country: United States
- State: Ohio
- County: Medina
- Founded: November 30, 1818; 207 years ago
- Incorporated: January 31, 1835; 191 years ago (village)
- Incorporated: May 6, 1952; 74 years ago (city)
- Named for: Medina

Government
  - Type: Mayor-Council
  - Body: Medina City Council
  - Mayor: James A. Shields (I)

Area
  - Total: 12.00 sq mi (31.08 km^{2})
  - Land: 11.79 sq mi (30.54 km^{2})
  - Water: 0.21 sq mi (0.54 km^{2})
- Elevation: 1,066 ft (325 m)

Population (2020)
  - Total: 26,094
  - Estimate (2025): 25,764
  - Density: 2,147.0/sq mi (828.96/km^{2})
- Demonym(s): Medinian, Medinanite
- Time zone: UTC-5 (Eastern (EST))
  - Summer (DST): UTC-4 (EDT)
- ZIP codes: 44256, 44258
- Area codes: 234, 330
- FIPS code: 39-48790
- GNIS feature ID: 1086600
- Website: medinaoh.org

Medina (/məˈdaɪnə/ mə-DY-nə) is a city in Medina County, Ohio, United States, and its county seat. The population was 26,094 at the 2020 census. It lies about 33 miles (53 km) south of Cleveland and 23 miles (37 km) west of Akron within the Cleveland metropolitan area.

== History ==
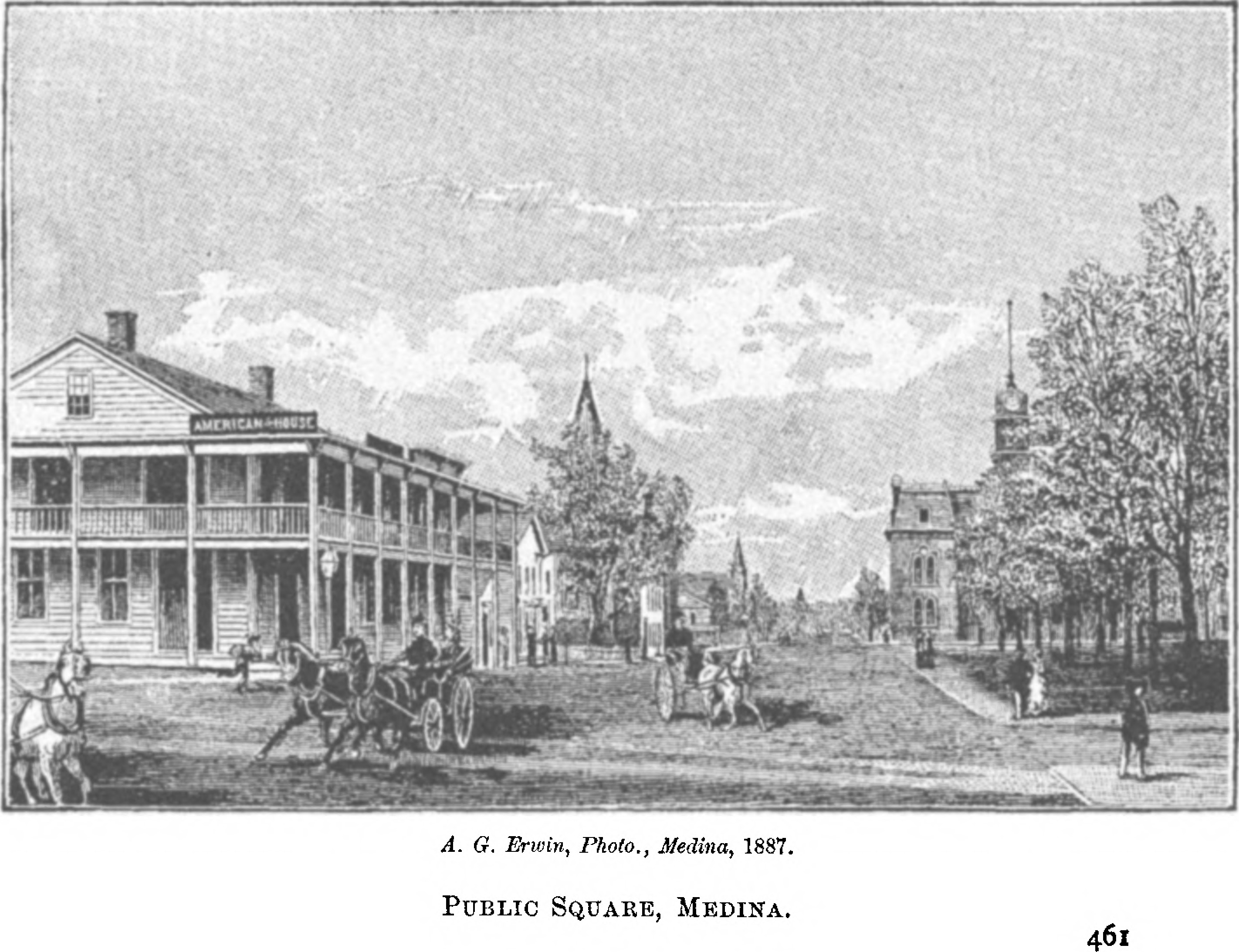
Medina town square, 1887

Medina was founded on November 30, 1818, as part of the Connecticut Western Reserve. It was originally named Mecca, but an unincorporated community in Ohio already had that name, so the name was changed. Both Mecca and Medina are Arabian cities particularly significant in Islam.

Most early residents were farmers. In the 1830s, the community's growth was aided by the completion of the Ohio and Erie Canal, which helped transport agricultural products to markets. On January 31, 1835, Medina was incorporated as a village and as the county seat of Medina County. By 1855, the town's quarries were producing over $200,000 worth of stone per year. In 1857, many of the canal workers started a strike for higher wages; the striking workers were fired, and the four workers who started it were jailed in Albion, Ohio.

In 1835, two enslaved women and two Native Americans arrived in Medina by stagecoach. One of the enslaved women was the child of then-vice presidential candidate Richard Mentor Johnson and Julia Chinn. The next day, Johnson's nephew arrived, in pursuit of the women, saying that he owned them both, they had escaped, and they had stolen a $1,000 bank check. The women were arrested and charged with stealing. Three local attorneys volunteered to represent them in court. The women were then released to Johnson's nephew to stand trial in Kentucky. Afterward, one of the Native Americans said that the women had asked for help escaping enslavement and their terrible treatment by their owners. It was later found that the alleged theft was a lie in order to make sure the Ohio court returned them to their owners.

Medina attorney Charles Olcott invented self-ballasting iron ships and received a patent in 1835. Olcott was originally from Connecticut and had been a student at Yale College when he came up with the early prototypes for his invention. He was later a proponent of building long-distance railroad lines across Ohio.

In 1869, Amos Root founded the A.I. Root Company in Medina as a manufacturer of beehives and beekeeping equipment, and the town became a center for beehive manufacturing. The Root Company had 97 workers in 1886, making it the town's largest employer.

A disastrous fire hit the village in 1848, destroying the entire business district. With no facilities for extinguishing fires, the residents attempted to put out the fire using a bucket brigade, but to no avail, as the fire burned for four hours. None of the town's residents died in the fire, but the townspeople failed to budget for the needed firefighting equipment. In 1870, another large fire, which started in a wooden building with a barbershop, destroyed 45 buildings—all but two blocks of the business district—and nearly wiped out the town. Even after the second calamitous fire struck, the town still had not organized a fire department beyond a bucket brigade. In 1877, after repeated dire warnings, the Council finally authorized the issuance of $3,000 worth of bonds to purchase a fire engine.

After the disastrous fire in 1870, much of the Medina Square, including the Town Hall and Engine House, was rebuilt under the supervision of onetime mayor and banker Harrison Gray Blake, who owned the Phoenix Building in the same city block. It took almost ten years to replace the buildings on Medina Square, hence their common Victorian style. Medina Square is now a recognized historic district, covering a nine-block area surrounding Uptown Park. The Community Design Committee and the Historic Preservation Board preserve the city's historic look and feel.

In 1950, Medina had over 5,000 residents, and on May 6, 1952, it was chartered as a city.

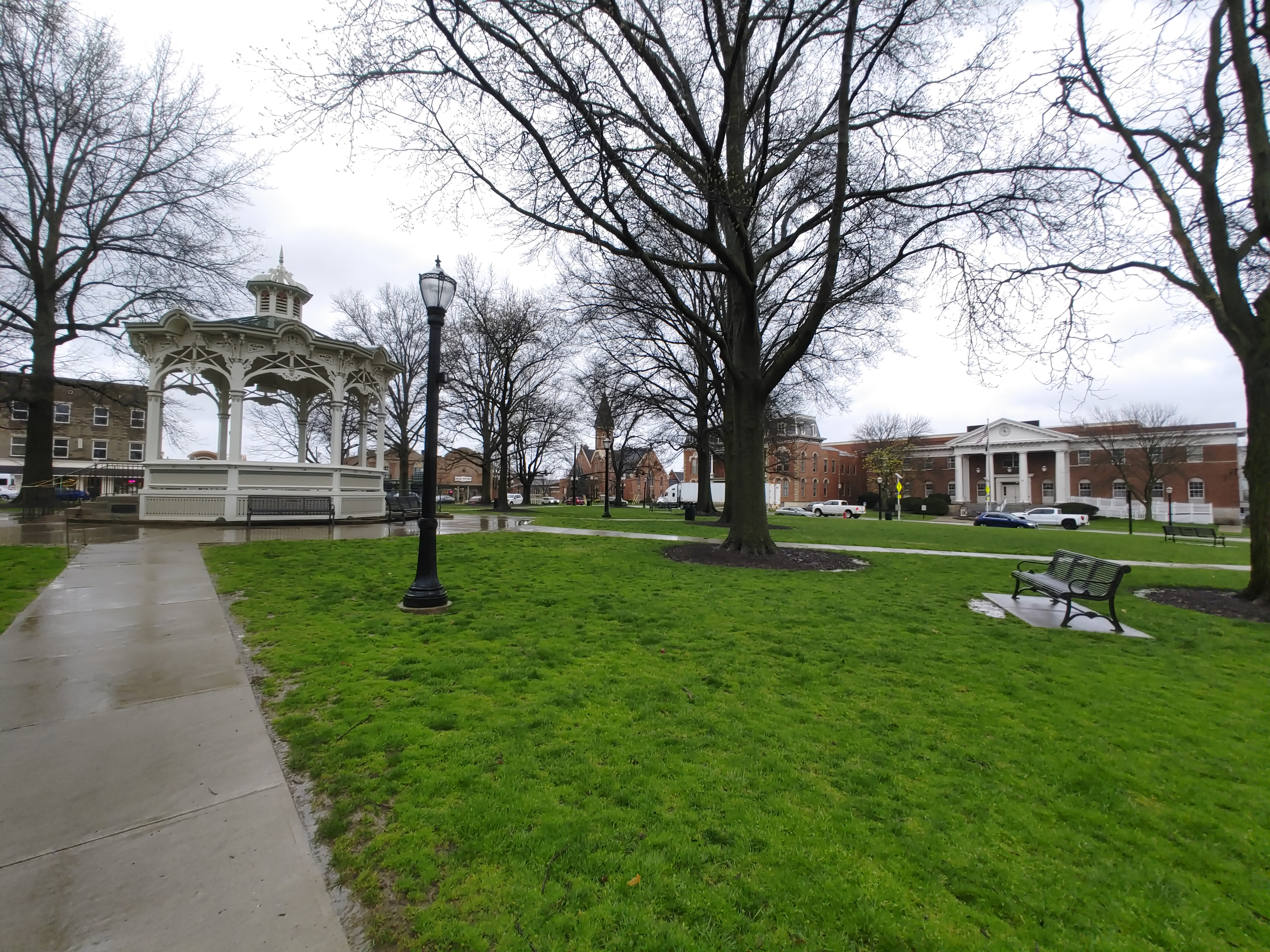
Uptown Park, 2024

== Geography ==
Medina includes parts of Lafayette Township, Medina Township, Montville Township and York Township in Medina County.

According to the United States Census Bureau, the city has an area of 12.00 square miles (31.08 km^{2}), of which 11.79 square miles (30.54 km^{2}) is land and 0.21 square miles (0.54 km^{2}) is water.

== Demographics ==
Historical population
Census	Pop.	Note	%±
1840	655		—
1850	1,009		54.0%
1860	1,234		22.3%
1870	1,159		−6.1%
1880	1,484		28.0%
1890	2,073		39.7%
1900	2,232		7.7%
1910	2,734		22.5%
1920	3,430		25.5%
1930	4,071		18.7%
1940	4,359		7.1%
1950	5,093		16.8%
1960	8,235		61.7%
1970	10,913		32.5%
1980	15,307		40.3%
1990	19,231		25.6%
2000	25,139		30.7%
2010	26,678		6.1%
2020	26,094		−2.2%
2025 (est.)	25,764		−1.3%

=== 2020 census ===
As of the 2020 census, Medina had a population of 26,094 people and 10,659 households residing in the city. The median age was 40.0 years; 22.9% of residents were under the age of 18 and 17.3% were 65 years of age or older. For every 100 females there were 92.3 males, and for every 100 females age 18 and over there were 88.6 males age 18 and over.

There were 7,531 families residing in the city. The population density was 2,174.50 people per square mile (839.575 people per square km), and the housing units had an average density of 944.42 per square mile (364.64/km^{2}).

There were 10,659 households in Medina, of which 30.1% had children under the age of 18 living in them. Of all households, 47.0% were married-couple households, 16.7% were households with a male householder and no spouse or partner present, and 29.6% were households with a female householder and no spouse or partner present. About 30.8% of all households were made up of individuals and 13.5% had someone living alone who was 65 years of age or older.

There were 11,333 housing units, of which 5.9% were vacant. The homeowner vacancy rate was 1.3% and the rental vacancy rate was 9.6%.

99.7% of residents lived in urban areas, while 0.3% lived in rural areas.

Racial composition as of the 2020 census
Race	Number	Percent
White	23,040	88.3%
Black or African American	912	3.5%
American Indian and Alaska Native	50	0.2%
Asian	233	0.9%
Native Hawaiian and Other Pacific Islander	5	0.0%
Some other race	338	1.3%
Two or more races	1,516	5.8%
Hispanic or Latino (of any race)	871	3.3%

=== 2010 census ===
At the 2010 census, there were 26,678 people, 10,382 households, and 6,991 families residing in the city. The population density was 2,260.85 people per square mile (872.973 people per square km). There were 11,152 housing units at an average density of 929.33 per square mile (358.82/km^{2}). The racial makeup of the city was 93.3% White, 3.1% African American, 0.1% Native American, 0.9% Asian, 0.5% from other races, and 2.1% from two or more races. Hispanic or Latino people of any race were 1.8% of the population.

There were 10,382 households, of which 38.0% had children under the age of 18 living with them, 51.7% were married couples living together, 12.0% had a female householder with no husband present, 3.6% had a male householder with no wife present, and 32.7% were non-families. 27.8% of all households were made up of individuals, and 11% had someone living alone who was 65 years of age or older. The average household size was 2.53 and the average family size was 3.13.

The median age in the city was 36.4. 28.3% of residents were under 18; 7.3% were between 18 and 24; 27.4% were from 25 to 44; 25.2% were from 45 to 64; and 11.7% were 65 or older. The gender makeup of the city was 48.1% male and 51.9% female.

Of the city's population over age 25, 34.4% held a bachelor's degree or higher.

=== 2000 census ===
At the 2000 census, there were 25,139 people, 9,467 households, and 6,683 families in the city. The population density was 2,215.7 people per square mile (855.14 people per square kilometer). There were 9,924 housing units at an average density of 891.92 inhabitants per square mile (344.37/km^{2}). The racial makeup of the city was 94.60% White, 2.77% African American, 0.19% Native American, 0.74% Asian, 0.03% Pacific Islander, 0.26% from other races, and 1.41% from two or more races. Hispanic or Latino people of any race were 1.00% of the population.

There were 9,467 households, of which 40.3% had children under age 18 living with them, 35.5% were married couples living together, 57.6% had a female householder with no husband present, and 29.4% were non-families. 25.1% of all households were made up of individuals, and 9.5% had someone living alone who was 65 or older. The average household size was 2.60 and the average family size was 3.15.

29.9% of the population were under 18, 7.2% from 18 to 24, 33.8% from 25 to 44, 18.8% from 45 to 64, and 10.2% were 65 or older. The median age was 33. For every 100 females, there were 92.1 males. For every 100 females 18 and over, there were 89.2 males.

The median household income was $50,226 and the median family income was $57,435. Males had a median income of $42,437 compared with $26,893 for females. The per capita income was $21,709. About 5.1% of families and 5.7% of the population were below the poverty line, including 7.1% of those under 18 and 6.2% of those 65 or over.

== Economy ==
Due to Medina's location, about 33 miles (53 km) south of Cleveland and 23 miles (37 km) west of Akron, many of its residents work in the Cleveland and Akron areas. Medina's median household income is $53,586, slightly above the Ohio median income.

RPM International is among the companies based in Medina.

== Education ==
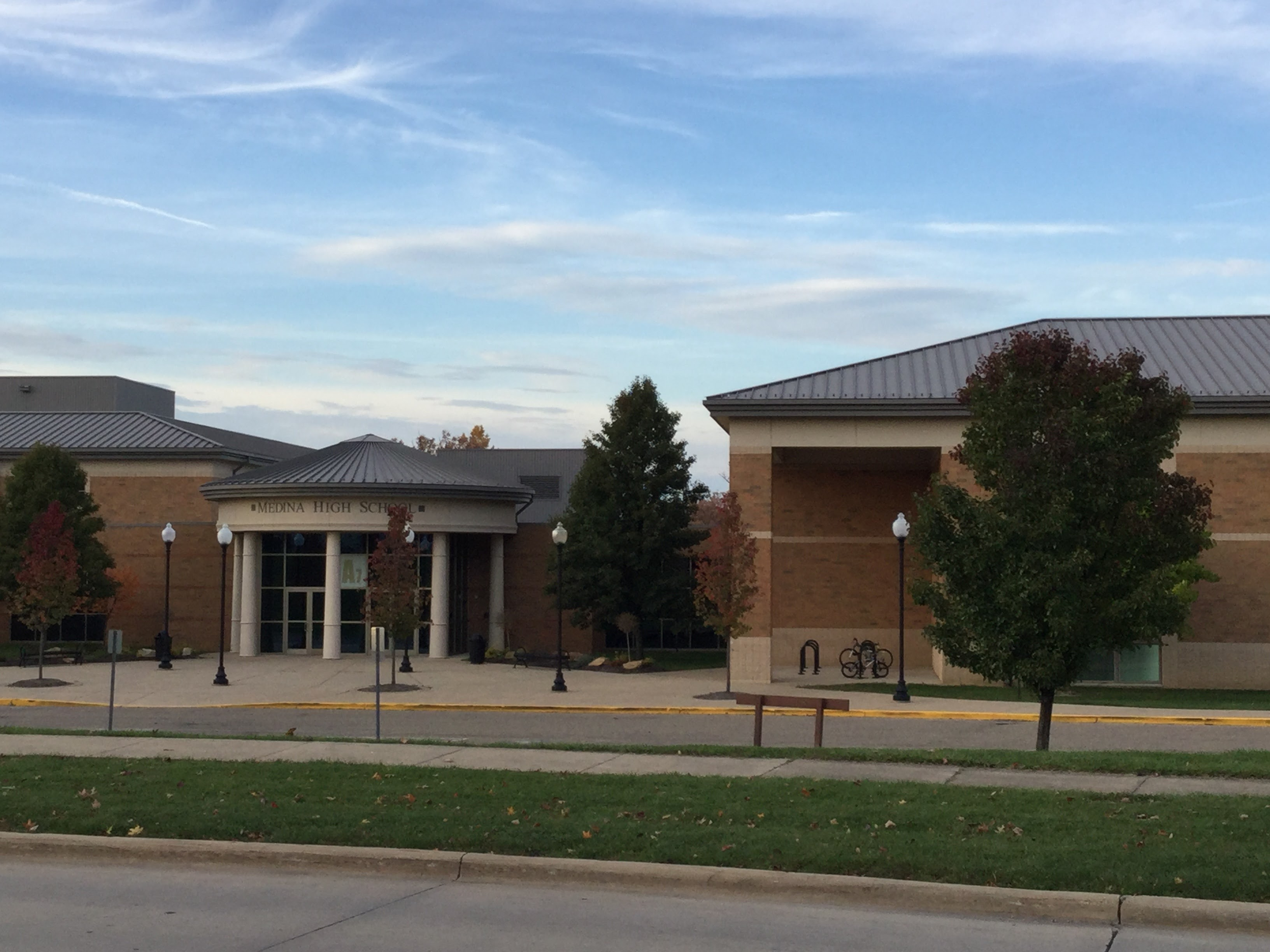
Medina High School

The Medina City School District serves the city. It has one high school, two middle schools, one alternative school (for students with behavioral problems), one preschool (for children aged 3–5 with disabilities) and five elementary schools. The newest elementary schools are Eliza Northrop and Ralph E. Waite Elementary School, both opened for the 2009–10 school year. Both Garfield Elementary School and Heritage Elementary School were closed at the end of the 2023–24 school year due to redistricting. The current schools in the Medina City School District are:

- A.I. Root Middle School
- Claggett Middle School
- Eliza Northrop Elementary School
- Ella Canavan Elementary School
- Evolve Academy (alternative school for students with behavioral problems)
- Helping Hands Preschool (preschool for children aged 3–5 with disabilities)
- H.G. Blake Elementary School
- Medina High School
- Ralph E. Waite Elementary School
- Sidney Fenn Elementary School

The Medina County Career Center serves the Medina City School District and provides career education for 11th and 12th graders, as well as adult and continuing education for adults. Other schools in Medina include St. Francis Xavier School, a Roman Catholic parochial school serving preschool (Pre-K) through 8th grade, and Medina Christian Academy, a non-denominational Protestant parochial school serving Pre-K through 12th grade. The Medina County Career Center-South Campus is a quarter-mile south of the city and offers adult and continuing education in law enforcement (in partnership with the Medina County Sheriff's Office), and paramedic and Emergency Medical Technician (E.M.T.) training. Medina also is home to the Walton School of Auctioneering.

The Medina County District Library Main Library is in Medina.

== Media ==
Medina is served by a daily newspaper, the Medina County Gazette which is published every day of the week except Sundays and federal holidays, and a free weekly newspaper, The Medina Post, published every Saturday. The Akron Beacon Journal and the Cleveland Plain Dealer occasionally cover the city and Medina County.

Medina is served by numerous television and radio stations from both the Greater Cleveland, Greater Akron and Greater Canton areas.

== Government ==
The city's mayor is James A. Shields, an independent and former city council member who was elected on November 4, 2025. Mayor James A. Shields was sworn into office at an organizational meeting of the city council on January 6, 2026.

== Transportation ==
Medina is served by the Medina Municipal Airport, which is 4.6 miles (7.41 km) east of the city. US-42 traverses the city. State routes include OH-3, OH-18 and OH-57. Medina is also served by the Medina Transit Authority, which runs buses around Medina and Medina County.

Rail service reached Medina in the 1800s, and at one time it was served by three rail lines, the Baltimore & Ohio, the Akron, Canton & Youngstown, and the Cleveland Southwestern interurban. Today the Wheeling & Lake Erie Railroad maintains numerous sidings and spurs serving many industries, mostly on the city's west side. Many other rights of way have been converted to hiking and biking trails.

== Notable people ==
- Drew Allar, NFL quarterback
- Matt Amodio, game show contestant known for winning over $1,500,000 on Jeopardy!
- William G. Batchelder, former judge and former speaker of the Ohio House of Representatives
- Gilbert S. Carpenter, US Army brigadier general
- Ryan Dunn, actor, stuntman (Jackass)
- Scott Fahlman, computer scientist and credited creator of the emoticon
- Wayne Gift, NFL quarterback
- Kyle Juszczyk, NFL fullback
- Daryl Morey, NBA basketball executive
- Frankie Mossman, racing driver
- L.L. Nunn, founder of Telluride House, Telluride Association, and Deep Springs College
- Isaiah Parente, professional soccer player, currently playing for the LA Galaxy of Major League Soccer.
- Matthew Patrick, founder and former host of the YouTube channel The Game Theorists & GTLive
- Greg Paulus, head coach Niagara Purple Eagles
- Aaron Quine, racing driver
- Bobby Rahal, auto racing team owner and former driver
- Amos Root, noted for innovations in beekeeping
- Jon Teske, NBA basketball player
- Donna VanLiere, author of the Christmas Shoes series of books and other publications
- Ricky Wysocki, professional disc golfer
