= Lake Nona High School =

High school in Orlando, Florida

Location
- 12500 Narcoossee Road; Orlando, Florida 32832; United States; 28.385492°N 81.244498°W

Information
- Type: Public high school
- Established: 2009
- School district: Orange County Public Schools
- NCES School ID: 120144007646
- Dean: Tammy Lafayette and Timothy Freund
- Principal: Nikki Campbell
- Teaching staff: 118.00 (on an FTE basis)
- Grades: 9–12
- Enrollment: 2,974 (2024–2025)
- Student to teacher ratio: 25.20
- Campus size: 377,000 sq ft (35,000 m^{2})
- Colors: Navy, silver, and white
- Mascot: Lion
- Rival: None
- Newspaper: Lake Nona Ledger
- Website: www.lakenonahs.ocps.net

Lake Nona High School is a public high school in the Orange County Public Schools district of Orlando, Florida, United States. It was a relief school for Odyssey Middle School, Cypress Creek High School, and Oak Ridge High.

Lake Nona High School stands as one of the more challenging schools in Orange County due to its rigorous academic workload, significantly high AP enrollment, and open dual enrollment program through Valencia College. In addition to the school's collegiate focus, students have the ability to attend a fast-track nursing program, Health Science Academy starting in their freshman year. The school rating has repeatedly been a high 'A' since 2012. Lake Nona has a graduation rate of 97.7%.

== History ==
Construction began in August 2007 and was completed in June 2009. Its first principal, Dr. A. Robert "Rob" Anderson, was originally principal at Edgewater High.

For its opening year, Nona served grades 6–11. Middle school students moved to their own campus, Lake Nona Middle School, in the 2011–12 school year, leaving Lake Nona High School to serve only grades 9–12.

In the spring of 2012, Lake Nona High School allowed Valencia College students to go there while the new Valencia College was being built. The students from Valencia College were there until the new building was fully constructed in August 2012.

== Overview ==
The school's mascot is a lion and the school colours are navy blue, silver, and white. The 377,000-square-foot (35,000 m^{2}) campus includes ten buildings consisting of one and two-story concrete, tilt-wall construction housing administration, classrooms, art and music rooms, kitchen, multi-purpose and dining facility, auditorium, gymnasium, playing fields and outdoor activity areas.

== Demographics ==
The 2018–2019 school year had 25.8% white students, 56.2% Hispanic students, 9.0% black students, 5.5% Asian students, and 3.5% mixed/other race students. They also had 43.9% male enrollment and 56.1% female enrollment.

== Notable alumni ==
- Zane Durant – American football defensive tackle for the Buffalo Bills
