= Sean Clifford =

American football player (born 1998)

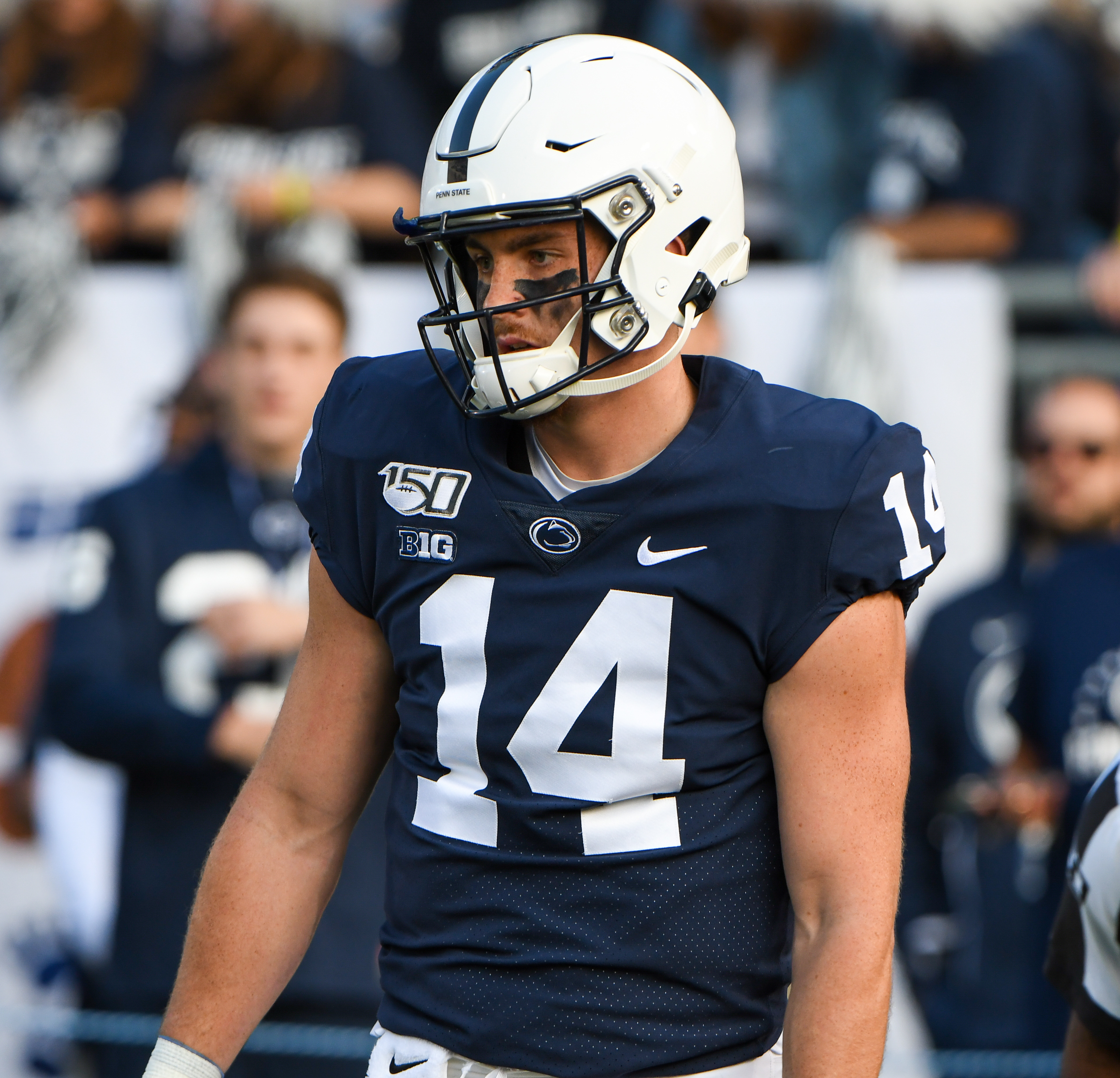
- Clifford with the Penn State Nittany Lions in 2019

No. 4 – Cincinnati Bengals
- Position: Quarterback
- Roster status: Practice squad

Personal information
- Born: July 14, 1998 (age 28); Barrington, Illinois, U.S.
- Listed height: 6 ft 2 in (1.88 m)
- Listed weight: 212 lb (96 kg)

Career information
- High school: St. Xavier (Cincinnati, Ohio)
- College: Penn State (2017–2022)
- NFL draft: 2023: 5th round, 149th overall pick

Career history
- Green Bay Packers (2023–2024); Cincinnati Bengals (2025–present)

Career NFL statistics as of 2025
- Passing attempts: 1
- Passing completions: 1
- Completion percentage: 100.0%
- TD–INT: 0–0
- Passing yards: 37
- Passer rating: 118.7
- Stats at Pro Football Reference

Sean Burke Clifford (born July 14, 1998) is an American professional football quarterback for the Cincinnati Bengals of the National Football League (NFL). He played college football for the Penn State Nittany Lions. He was the starting quarterback and team captain for the Nittany Lions from 2019 through 2022.

== Early life ==
Clifford graduated from St. Xavier High School in Cincinnati in 2017. During his high school tenure, he passed for 4,004 yards and 30 touchdowns with a school record 1,100 rushing yards and 20 touchdowns as a quarterback. In his senior season he led the Bombers to a Division 1 State Championship. Clifford committed to Penn State University to play college football.

== College career ==
After redshirting his first year at Penn State in 2017, Clifford spent 2018 as Trace McSorley's backup. He appeared in four games, completing five of seven passes for 195 yards with two touchdowns.

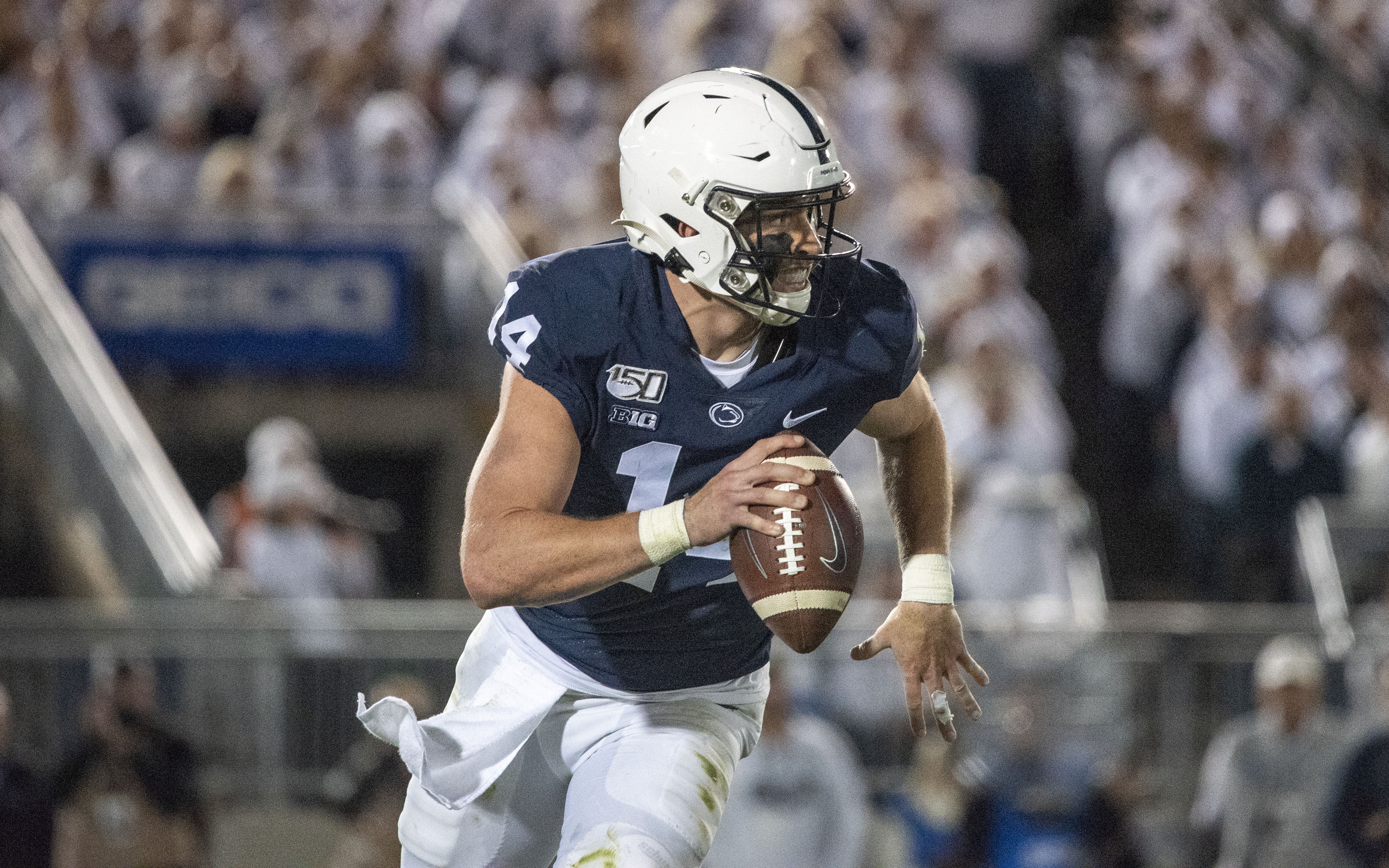
Clifford in 2019

Clifford was named the starting quarterback in 2019. He was selected All-Big Ten honorable mention by the coaches and media, and named an Academic All-Big Ten honoree.

Clifford played in all nine games of a shortened season during the COVID-19 pandemic. He was 152-for-251 (60.6%) for 1,883 yards with 16 touchdowns and nine interceptions. Clifford again was named an Academic All-Big Ten Conference honoree and earned a bachelor's degree in advertising and public relations following the 2020 fall semester.

Clifford started all 13 games of the 2021 season and finished 261-for-429 passing with 3,107 yards, 21 touchdowns and nine interceptions. He was honored in the 2021 NFF National Scholar-Athlete Class, selected to the Allstate AFCA Good Works Team, earned a spot on the Senior CLASS Award first team, named All-Big Ten honorable mention by the coaches and media, named Penn State's Big Ten Sportsmanship Award honoree, earned Academic All-Big Ten honors, and earned the team's Public Service and Lion's Pride Outstanding Senior Player Awards.

Clifford started all 13 games of the 2022 season and finished 226-for-351 passing with 2,822 yards, 24 touchdowns and seven interceptions. During the 2023 Rose Bowl, Sean Clifford's 88-yard touchdown pass to KeAndre Lambert-Smith became the longest passing play in Rose Bowl game history. He was named Big Ten Offensive Player of the Week twice (Purdue September 1, 2022; Minnesota October 22, 2022). He was also honored as the 2022 Brian Westbrook Regional Player of the Year.

=== College statistics ===
Season	Team	Games			Passing								Rushing			
Season	Team	GP	GS	Record	Cmp	Att	Pct	Yds	Avg	TD	Int	Rtg	Att	Yds	Avg	TD
2017	Penn State	Redshirted (redshirt)														
2018	Penn State	4	0	—	5	7	71.4	195	27.9	2	0	399.7	5	−3	−0.6	0
2019	Penn State	12	12	10–2	189	219	59.2	2,654	8.3	23	7	148.5	116	402	3.5	5
2020	Penn State	9	8	4–4	152	251	60.6	1,883	7.5	16	9	137.4	99	335	3.4	3
2021	Penn State	13	13	7–6	261	428	61.0	3,107	7.3	21	8	134.4	99	163	1.6	2
2022	Penn State	13	13	11–2	226	351	64.4	2,822	8.0	24	7	150.5	69	176	2.6	5
Career		51	46	32–14	833	1,356	61.4	10,661	7.9	86	31	143.8	388	1,073	2.8	15

== Professional career ==
Pre-draft measurables
Height	Weight	Arm length	Hand span	Wingspan	40-yard dash	10-yard split	20-yard split	20-yard shuttle	Three-cone drill	Vertical jump	Broad jump
6 ft 1 1/2 in (1.87 m)	211 lb (96 kg)	31 5/8 in (0.80 m)	9 5/8 in (0.24 m)	6 ft 4 3/4 in (1.95 m)	4.62 s	1.60 s	2.75 s	4.25 s	6.84 s	30.5 in (0.77 m)	9 ft 8 in (2.95 m)
All values from Pro Day

=== Green Bay Packers ===
Clifford was selected by the Green Bay Packers in the fifth round with the 149th pick of the 2023 NFL draft. He signed his rookie contract on May 5, 2023.

He made his NFL debut on September 10, 2023, relieving Jordan Love in the closing minutes of a 38–20 win against the Chicago Bears; he attempted no passes and rushed the ball once for no gain. He did not see the field again until December 31, when he completed his first NFL pass attempt, a 37–yarder to Bo Melton, during a 33–10 win against the Minnesota Vikings.

Clifford was released on August 27, 2024, and re-signed to the practice squad. He was elevated to the active roster for Weeks 2 and 3 in September 2024. Clifford was signed by the Packers to the active roster on January 11, 2025.

On August 26, 2025, Clifford was released by the Packers as part of final roster cuts.

=== Cincinnati Bengals ===
On September 16, 2025, Clifford was signed to the Cincinnati Bengals' practice squad as a result of an injury to Bengals starting quarterback Joe Burrow. On October 31, Clifford was signed from the practice squad to the active roster as a result of an injury suffered by Joe Flacco. He was waived on November 24, and re-signed to the practice squad.

Clifford signed a reserve/future contract with Cincinnati on January 5, 2026. On August 30, Clifford was waived by the Bengals as a part of final roster cuts and re-signed to the practice squad the next day.

== NFL career statistics ==
=== Regular season ===
Year	Team	Games			Passing									Rushing					Sacks		Fumbles	
Year	Team	GP	GS	Record	Cmp	Att	Pct	Yds	Y/A	Lng	TD	Int	Rtg	Att	Yds	Avg	Lng	TD	Sck	SckY	Fum	Lost
2023	GB	2	0	—	1	1	100.0	37	37.0	37	0	0	118.7	3	−2	−0.7	0	0	0	0	1	0
2024	GB	0	0	—	DNP																	
2025	CIN	0	0	—	DNP																	
Career		2	0	—	1	1	100.0	37	37.0	37	0	0	118.7	3	−2	−0.7	0	0	0	0	1	0

=== Postseason ===
Year	Team	Games			Passing									Rushing					Sacks		Fumbles	
Year	Team	GP	GS	Record	Cmp	Att	Pct	Yds	Y/A	Lng	TD	Int	Rtg	Att	Yds	Avg	Lng	TD	Sck	SckY	Fum	Lost
2023	GB	1	0	—	0	0	0	0	—	0	0	0	0.0	0	0	—	0	0	0	0	0	0
2024	GB	0	0	—	DNP																	
Career		0	0	—	0	0	0.0	0	—	0	0	0	0.0	0	0	—	0	0	0	0	0	0

== Business ventures ==
In 2022, Sean and Liam Clifford founded the student-athlete NIL agency, Limitless NIL. Limitless athletes have signed deals accumulating over $250,000 with over 50 companies. Limitless NIL was sold to TEAM Group Holdings inc. in 2023.
