= 2019 Denver Broncos season =

American football team season

- Owner: The Bowlen family (via Pat Bowlen’s estate)
- General manager: John Elway
- Head coach: Vic Fangio
- Home stadium: Empower Field at Mile High

Results
- Record: 7–9
- Division place: 2nd AFC West
- Playoffs: Did not qualify
- All-Pros: S Justin Simmons (2nd team)
- Pro Bowlers: OLB Von Miller; WR Courtland Sutton

Uniform
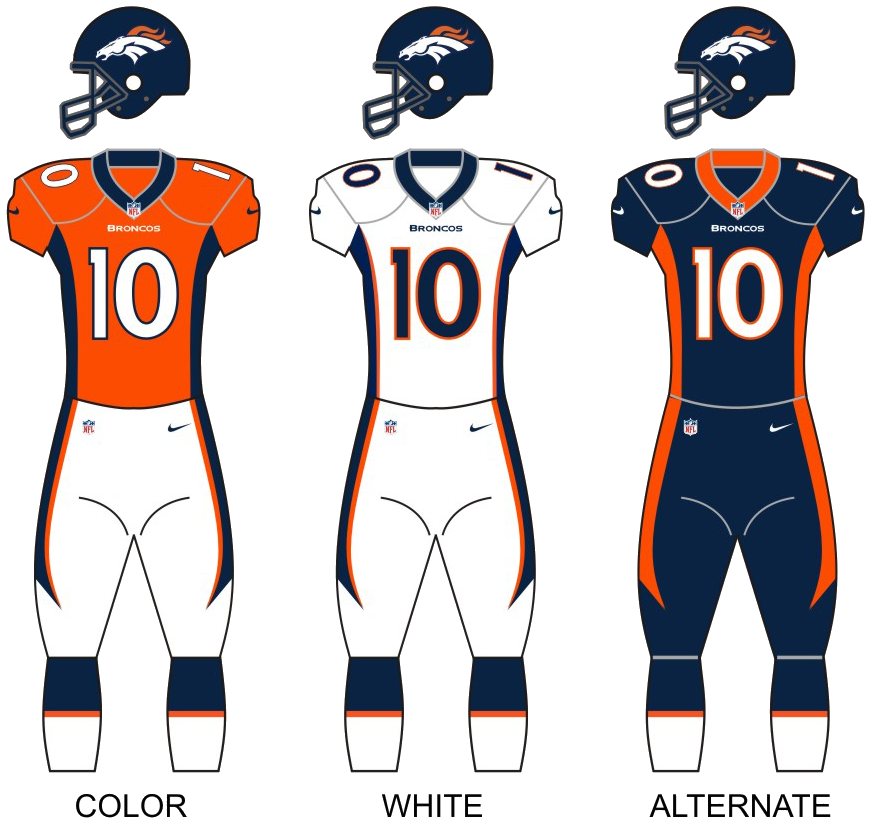

The 2019 season was the Denver Broncos' 50th in the National Football League (NFL) and their 60th overall.

This marked the Broncos' first season under new ownership since 1984, as longtime owner Pat Bowlen died during the offseason. The team underwent numerous coaching changes following the end of the 2018 season, as Vic Fangio became the Broncos' third different head coach since 2014. After their first 0–4 start since 1999, the Broncos went 7–5 the rest of the way, finishing at 7–9 and improving on their 6–10 record from 2018; however, they missed the playoffs for a fourth consecutive season. The team struggled with poor offensive performances, ranking in the bottom five in several statistical categories. The team underwent a quarterback carousel, and for a fourth consecutive season, scored 30 or more points only once.

This season would be the first time since 2011 that the Broncos would lose in Week 1 and start 0–1, both times being a loss to their division rival Oakland Raiders.

== Coaching changes ==
- December 31, 2018: One day after the Broncos' 2018 regular-season finale, head coach Vance Joseph was fired, after posting an 11–21 record in his two seasons as the Broncos' head coach.
- January 10: Vic Fangio was named the 17th head coach in Broncos' franchise history, replacing Vance Joseph. This will be Fangio's first head coaching gig after 19 years as a defensive assistant. Fangio previously served as a defensive coordinator with the Carolina Panthers from 1995 to 1998, the Indianapolis Colts from 1999 to 2001, the Houston Texans from 2002 to 2005, the San Francisco 49ers from 2011 to 2014 and the Chicago Bears from 2015 to 2018.
- January 14: Mike Munchak was hired as the offensive line coach. Munchak served in the same capacity with the Pittsburgh Steelers from 2014 to 2018.
- January 15: Brandon Staley was hired as the outside linebackers coach. Staley served in the same capacity with the Chicago Bears during the previous two seasons (2017–2018), alongside current Broncos' head coach Vic Fangio. Ed Donatell was hired as the defensive coordinator. This will be Donatell's third stint with the Broncos, having coached the defensive backs from 1995 to 1999 and 2009–2010. Donatell also served as a defensive backs alongside Vic Fangio during the previous eight seasons—with the San Francisco 49ers from 2011 to 2014 and the Chicago Bears from 2015 to 2018.
- January 16: Rich Scangarello, who spent 2017 and 2018 as the San Francisco 49ers' quarterbacks coach, was hired as the offensive coordinator.
- January 17: Wade Harman was hired as the tight ends coach. Harman worked in the same capacity with the Atlanta Falcons from 2015 to 2018. Renaldo Hill was hired as the defensive backs coach. This will be Hill's second season as an assistant coach, having worked in the same capacity with the Miami Dolphins in 2018. As a player, Hill was also a Broncos' safety from 2009 to 2010.
- January 22: Chris Kuper, who was a Broncos' offensive lineman from 2006 to 2013, was hired as an assistant offensive line coach. Kuper spent the previous three season (2016–2018) as a Miami Dolphins' offensive assistant.
- January 31: T. C. McCartney was hired as the quarterbacks coach. McCartney served as an offensive assistant with the San Francisco 49ers in 2015, 2017 and 2018—the latter two seasons alongside current offensive coordinator Rich Scangarello. McCartney replaced Klint Kubiak, who accepted the same position with the Minnesota Vikings two weeks earlier.

== Front office changes ==
On January 14, Gary Kubiak, the team's senior personnel advisor during the previous two seasons, departed for an assistant head coach/offensive advisor position with the Minnesota Vikings.

== Death of owner Pat Bowlen ==
On June 13, owner Pat Bowlen died at the age of 75, following a long battle with Alzheimer's disease. Bowlen, who had served as the team's majority owner since 1984, relinquished control of the team prior to the 2014 season after privately battling the disease five years prior. This resulted in Bowlen transferring control to a three-person group known as "The Pat Bowlen Trust," consisting of team president/CEO Joe Ellis, team counsel Rich Slivka and Denver attorney Mary Kelly. Bowlen was the fastest owner to reach 300 wins, and during Bowlen's 35 seasons as majority owner, the team posted the league's second-best winning percentage (354–240–1, .596), behind only the New England Patriots. The team also reached seven Super Bowls, winning three (XXXII, XXXIII and 50) and suffered a league-low seven losing seasons. Bowlen's death occurred two months before he was inducted into the Pro Football Hall of Fame.

One year before Pat Bowlen's death, two of his children expressed interest in succeeding as the Broncos' controlling owner—Beth Bowlen Wallace and Brittany Bowlen. On December 2, Brittany Bowlen, 29, made her return to the Broncos' organization with a senior management position of vice president of strategic initiatives, following the end of her employment with McKinsey & Company. Ellis stated that selling the team remained an option, even with Brittany Bowlen's return to the organization.

== Roster changes ==
=== Free agents ===
==== Unrestricted ====
Position	Player	2019 team	Notes
LB	Shaquil Barrett	Tampa Bay Buccaneers	signed with the Buccaneers on March 15
CB	Tramaine Brock	Arizona Cardinals	signed with the Cardinals on April 2
G	Max Garcia	Arizona Cardinals	signed with the Cardinals on March 16
LB	Jerrol Garcia-Williams	None	originally an ERFA
C	Gino Gradkowski	None	
TE	Jeff Heuerman	Denver Broncos	re-signed March 15
QB	Kevin Hogan	None	originally an RFA, re-signed March 21, waived August 31
DE	Zach Kerr	Arizona Cardinals	re-signed March 16, released August 26
TE	Matt LaCosse	New England Patriots	originally an ERFA, signed with the Patriots on March 14
LB	Brandon Marshall	Oakland Raiders	signed with the Raiders on March 28
LB	Deiontrez Mount	None	
C	Matt Paradis	Carolina Panthers	signed with the Panthers on March 13
TE	Brian Parker	New Orleans Saints	signed with the Saints on October 13
DT	Domata Peko	Baltimore Ravens	signed with Ravens on November 12
LB	Shane Ray	Baltimore Ravens	signed with the Ravens on May 17
CB	Bradley Roby	Houston Texans	signed with the Texans on March 13
CB	Jamar Taylor	Seattle Seahawks	signed with the Seahawks on May 9
WR	Jordan Taylor	Minnesota Vikings	originally an RFA, signed with the Vikings on April 13
G	Billy Turner	Green Bay Packers	signed with the Packers on March 14
OT	Jared Veldheer	New England Patriots	signed with the Patriots on May 13, retired May 21

==== Restricted and exclusive-rights ====
Position	Player	Tag	2019 team	Notes
DE	Shelby Harris	RFA	Denver Broncos	assigned tender on March 7, resigned April 2
LB	Joseph Jones	ERFA	Denver Broncos	assigned tender on March 7, resigned April 2
LS	Casey Kreiter	RFA	Denver Broncos	re-signed March 7
WR	Tim Patrick	ERFA	Denver Broncos	assigned tender on March 7, resigned April 2
S	Dymonte Thomas	ERFA	TBD	assigned tender on March 7, re-signed April 2, waived August 31
OT	Elijah Wilkinson	ERFA	Denver Broncos	assigned tender on March 7, resigned April 2
Restricted Free Agent (RFA): Players with three accrued seasons whose contracts expired at the end of the previous season Exclusive-Rights Free Agent (ERFA): Players with two or fewer accrued seasons whose contracts expired at the end of the previous season

=== Signings ===
Position	Player	2018 team(s)	Notes
QB	Brandon Allen	Los Angeles Rams	signed September 1
LB	Jeremiah Attaochu	New York Jets	signed October 1
CB	De'Vante Bausby	Philadelphia Eagles	signed April 4, placed on injured reserve October 8
FB/TE	Andrew Beck	None	signed September 1
PK	Taylor Bertolet	New York Jets	signed April 29, waived July 23
OT	Adam Bisnowaty	Minnesota Vikings	signed August 9, waived August 31
WR	Fred Brown	Practice squad	promoted from the practice squad on September 24,
CB	Bryce Callahan	Chicago Bears	signed March 15
CB	Rashard Causey	None	signed August 11, waived August 31
FB/TE	Orson Charles	Cleveland Browns	signed August 21, released August 31, re-signed November 19, waived November 22
WR	River Cracraft	Denver Broncos	initially waived September 1, re-signed September 11, waived September 24
WR	Steven Dunbar Jr.	San Francisco 49ers	signed July 18, waived August 31
OT	Chaz Green	New Orleans Saints; Oakland Raiders	signed June 3, released August 31
CB	Devontae Harris	Cincinnati Bengals	signed September 2
DE	Jonathan Harris	None	originally undrafted, signed by the Chicago Bears after the draft, claimed off waivers on October 23
TE	Bug Howard	Atlanta Legends	signed May 13, placed on injured reserve August 21
CB	Kareem Jackson	Houston Texans	signed March 13, suspended for the final two games
OT	Ja'Wuan James	Miami Dolphins	signed March 13
CB	Cyrus Jones	Baltimore Ravens	claimed off waivers on November 13, designated as reserve/non-football injury on November 26
G	Tyler Jones	None	signed August 21, waived August 31, assigned to the practice squad on September 1
C/G	Corey Levin	Tennessee Titans	signed September 1, waived September 14
C	Patrick Morris	Pittsburgh Steelers	claimed off waivers on December 3
LB	Corey Nelson	Atlanta Falcons	signed September 2, placed on injured reserve November 1
LB	Dadi Nicolas	Washington Redskins	claimed off waivers on August 21, designated as waived/injured on August 31
NT	Kyle Peko	Buffalo Bills	waived by the Bills on November 2 and by the Indianapolis Colts on November 9, signed by the Broncos on December 14
NT	Mike Purcell	Salt Lake Stallions	signed April 22
RB	Theo Riddick	Detroit Lions	signed August 4, placed on injured reserve September 2
OT	Jake Rodgers	Baltimore Ravens	signed April 22, waived September 1, assigned to the practice squad on September 3, promoted to the active roster on September 14
CB	Coty Sensabaugh	Pittsburgh Steelers	signed October 8, waived November 13
WR	Diontae Spencer	Ottawa Redblacks	signed September 1
P	Justin Vogel	Cleveland Browns	signed July 23, waived July 27
RB	David Williams	Jacksonville Jaguars	signed July 19, waived August 31
DE	DeShawn Williams	Indianapolis Colts	signed May 13, waived August 31
WR	Nick Williams	Los Angeles Rams; Tennessee Titans	signed July 26, released August 26
DE	Billy Winn	None	signed April 22, placed on injured reserve August 4
WR	Kelvin McKnight	"None"	signed to Practice Squad on October 23

=== Trades ===
- February 13: The Broncos agreed in principle to trade for former Baltimore Ravens' quarterback Joe Flacco in exchange for their 2019 fourth-round selection.
- March 7: The Broncos traded quarterback Case Keenum and a 2020 seventh-round selection to the Washington Redskins in exchange for the Redskins' 2020 sixth-round selection. This trade, along with the aforementioned trade for Joe Flacco, became official on March 13—the first day of the 2019 league year.
- April 27: The Broncos acquired linebacker Dekoda Watson as part of a trade that sent their fifth-round selection to the San Francisco 49ers—see draft trades below. This would have been Watson's second stint with the Broncos—he previously played one season with the Broncos in 2016 before signing with the 49ers in 2017; however, he was later released on August 26.
- August 30: The Broncos traded their 2020 sixth-round selection to the New England Patriots in exchange for cornerback Duke Dawson and the Patriots' 2020 seventh-round selection.
- October 22: The Broncos traded wide receiver Emmanuel Sanders and their 2020 fifth-round selection to the San Francisco 49ers in exchange for the 49ers' 2020 third-and fourth-round selections.

=== Departures ===
Position	Player	Notes
S	Su'a Cravens	waived August 31
QB	Garrett Grayson	waived May 2
WR	Chad Hansen	waived May 2
LB	Jeff Holland	waived August 11
WR	Andre Holmes	designated as waived/injured on January 24
OT	Andreas Knappe	waived April 15
CB	Craig Mager	waived April 18
S	Darian Stewart	released on March 7

=== Draft ===
The Broncos did not have selections in the fourth or seventh rounds—see draft trades below.

2019 Denver Broncos Draft
Round	Selection	Player	Position	College	Notes
1	20	Noah Fant	TE	Iowa	signed May 23
2	41	Dalton Risner	OT	Kansas State	signed July 16
2	42	Drew Lock	QB	Missouri	signed July 18, placed on injured reserve September 2, reinstated to the active roster on November 30, started during the Week 13 game on December 1
3	71	Dre'mont Jones	DT	Ohio State	signed June 11
5	156	Justin Hollins	LB	Oregon	signed May 14
6	187	Juwann Winfree	WR	Colorado	signed May 13, placed on injured reserve December 14

==== Draft trades ====
Trade partner	Broncos give	Broncos receive	Source
Baltimore Ravens	Original 2019 fourth-round selection—No. 113	Quarterback Joe Flacco	
Cincinnati Bengals	2019 second-round selection (No. 52—from PIT); 2019 fourth-round selection (No. 125—from HOU); Original 2019 sixth-round selection—No. 182	2019 second-round selection—No. 42	
Carolina Panthers	2019 sixth-round selection (No. 212—from SF); 2019 seventh-round selection (No. 237—from HOU)	2019 sixth-round selection—No. 187	
Houston Texans	Wide receiver Demaryius Thomas; 2019 seventh-round selection (No. 220—from NYG)	2019 fourth-round selection (No. 125—later traded to CIN); 2019 seventh-round selection (No. 237—later traded to CAR)	
Minnesota Vikings	Quarterback Trevor Siemian; 2018 seventh-round selection	2019 fifth-round selection—No. 156	
New York Giants	Punter Riley Dixon	2019 seventh-round selection (No. 220—later traded to HOU)	
Philadelphia Eagles	Original 2019 seventh-round selection—No. 222	Guard Allen Barbre	
Pittsburgh Steelers	Original 2019 first-round selection—No. 10	2019 first-round selection—No. 20; 2019 second-round selection (No. 52—later traded to CIN); 2020 third-round selection	
San Francisco 49ers	Original 2019 fifth-round selection—No. 148	Linebacker Dekoda Watson; 2019 sixth-round selection (No. 212—later traded to CAR)	

=== Undrafted free agents ===
All undrafted free agents were signed after the 2019 NFL draft concluded on April 27, unless noted otherwise.

2019 Denver Broncos undrafted free agents
Player	Position	College	Notes
Calvin Anderson	OT	Texas	originally signed and waived by the New England Patriots, then signed and waived by the New York Jets, signed October 1, on final roster
George Aston	FB	Pittsburgh	waived August 31
Quinn Bailey	OT	Arizona State	waived August 31, assigned to the practice squad on September 1, promoted to the active roster on December 24, on final roster
Trinity Benson	WR	East Central	waived August 31
Ryan Crozier	C	UConn	designated as waived/injured on August 31
Joe Dineen	LB	Kansas	designated as waived/injured on August 31
Austin Fort	TE	Wyoming	placed on injured reserve August 9
Ahmad Gooden	LB	Samford	waived August 31, assigned to the practice squad on September 1, promoted to the active roster on November 22, waived December 14
Romell Guerrier	WR	Florida Tech	designated as reserve/retired on July 20
Alijah Holder	CB	Stanford	waived August 31, assigned to the practice squad on September 1, promoted to the active roster on December 17, on final roster
Devontae Jackson	RB	West Georgia	waived August 31
Nathan Jacobson	OT	UNLV	signed May 13, waived July 19
Jaylen Johnson	DT	Washington	waived May 13
John Leglue	OT	Tulane	waived August 31
Kelvin McKnight	WR	Samford	waived August 31
Malik Reed	LB	Nevada	made the Week 1 and final roster
Brett Rypien	QB	Boise State	waived August 31, assigned to the practice squad on September 1, promoted to the active roster on November 1, waived November 30 assigned to the practice squad on December 2
Deyon Sizer	DE	CSU Pueblo	signed May 13, waived July 26, re-signed August 4, waived August 31, re-signed December 14, on final roster
Moral Stephens	TE	Florida	signed July 27, waived August 31
Shakial Taylor	CB	Kansas	originally signed and waived by the Indianapolis Colts, claimed off waivers on November 26, on final roster
Brian Wallace	OT	Arkansas	waived May 13
Josh Watson	LB	Colorado State	waived September 1, assigned to the practice squad on September 3, promoted to the active roster on November 1
Jamarius Way	WR	South Alabama	signed July 20, waived August 4

=== Suspensions ===
On December 17, safety Kareem Jackson was suspended for the final two games of the 2019 season for violating the league's Policy and Program on Substances of Abuse. Jackson's suspension stems from a September 19 arrest for driving while ability impaired, which he promptly reported to the team to be investigated by the NFL.

=== Injuries ===
- May 14: Guard Nico Falah was placed on injured reserve after rupturing his Achilles tendon during organized team activities (OTAs).
- August 4: Defensive end Billy Winn was placed on injured reserve after tearing his triceps during the team's win over the Atlanta Falcons in the Pro Football Hall of Fame Game.
- August 8: Undrafted rookie tight end Austin Fort tore the ACL in his knee during the team's second preseason game at the Seattle Seahawks, and was placed on injured reserve.
- September 2: Two days after trimming their roster to a league-mandated 53 players, the Broncos placed three players on injured reserve: quarterback Drew Lock, running back Theo Riddick and tight end Jake Butt. Lock, the team's second-round draft selection, sprained the thumb on his throwing hand during the team's fourth preseason game against the San Francisco 49ers. The Broncos used one of two designation for return (DFR) tags on Lock (the other on wide receiver Tim Patrick), and he was later reinstated to the active roster on November 30. Riddick injured his shoulder during the team's second preseason game at the Seattle Seahawks. Butt underwent a follow-up surgery following a setback in the recovery from an ACL tear in his knee that he suffered during the 2018 season.
- September 11: Wide receiver Tim Patrick was placed on injured reserve due to a fractured hand that he suffered during the team's Week 1 loss to the Oakland Raiders. He was later given a designation for return on October 30, and began practicing that same day. Patrick later returned to the active roster for the team's Week 11 game at the Minnesota Vikings.
- September 25: The Broncos announced that cornerback Bryce Callahan would initially miss at least four weeks due to a procedure on his injured foot. Callahan initially suffered the injury as a member of the Chicago Bears during Week 14 of the 2018 season, and experienced complications from the surgery that he underwent and missed the entire preseason. However, Callahan was later placed on the season-ending injured reserve on November 15.
- September 29: Linebacker Bradley Chubb suffered a partially torn ACL in his knee during the team's Week 4 loss to the Jacksonville Jaguars, and was placed on injured reserve two days later (October 1).
- October 8: Cornerback De'Vante Bausby was placed on injured reserve, two days after suffering a cervical sprain during the team's Week 5 win over the Los Angeles Chargers. Teammate A. J. Johnson inadvertently collided with Bausby while making a tackle.
- November 1: Quarterback Joe Flacco and linebacker Corey Nelson were each placed on injured reserve. Four days earlier (October 28), the team announced that Flacco sustained a herniated disc in his neck, one day after the team's Week 8 loss to the Indianapolis Colts (October 27), and was subsequently ruled out for the Broncos' Week 9 game vs. the Cleveland Browns. Nelson suffered torn biceps during the loss to the Colts.
- November 17: Fullback Andy Janovich was placed on injured reserve, two days after he dislocated his elbow during the team's Week 11 loss to the Minnesota Vikings.
- December 3: Defensive end Derek Wolfe was placed on injured reserve, two days after dislocating his elbow during the team's Week 13 win over the Los Angeles Chargers.
- December 24: Defensive end Adam Gotsis was placed on injured reserve, following knee surgery that caused him to miss the Broncos' Week 16 win over the Detroit Lions.

== Staff ==
2019 Denver Broncos staff
Front office: Owner – Estate of Pat Bowlen; President and CEO – Joe Ellis; President of Football Operations/general manager – John Elway; Director of player personnel – Matt Russell; Director of pro personnel – A.J. Durso; Director of Football Administration – Mike Sullivan; Director of Team Administration – Mark Thewes; Director of Player Development – Ray Jackson; Director of Football Analytics – Mitch Tanney; Director of college scouting – Brian Stark; Head coaches: Head coach – Vic Fangio; Offensive coaches: Offensive coordinator – Rich Scangarello; Quarterbacks – T. C. McCartney; Running backs – Curtis Modkins; Wide receivers – Zach Azzanni; Tight ends – Wade Harman; Offensive line – Mike Munchak; Assistant offensive line – Chris Kuper; Offensive quality control – Rob Calabrese; Offensive quality control – Justin Rascati	Defensive coaches: Defensive coordinator – Ed Donatell; Defensive line – Bill Kollar; Linebackers – Reggie Herring; Outside linebackers – Brandon Staley; Defensive backs – Renaldo Hill; Defensive assistant – Chris Beake; Assistant to head coach/defensive quality control – Mike Hiestand; Defensive quality control – Nathaniel Willingham; Special teams coaches: Special teams Coordinator – Tom McMahon; Assistant special teams – Chris Gould; Strength and conditioning: Head strength and conditioning – Loren Landow; Assistant strength and conditioning – Tyler Hill; Assistant strength and conditioning – Anthony Lomando; Assistant strength and conditioning – Cedric Smith

== Final roster ==
2019 Denver Broncos roster
Quarterbacks (QB): 5 Joe Flacco; 2 Brandon Allen; 3 Drew Lock; Running backs (RB): 23 Devontae Booker; 28 Royce Freeman; 30 Phillip Lindsay; Wide receivers (WR): 19 Fred Brown; 17 DaeSean Hamilton; 81 Tim Patrick; 11 Diontae Spencer; 14 Courtland Sutton; Tight ends (TE): 83 Andrew Beck; 87 Noah Fant; 84 Troy Fumagalli; 82 Jeff Heuerman	Offensive linemen (OL): 76 Calvin Anderson T; 75 Quinn Bailey T; 72 Garett Bolles T; 70 Ja'Wuan James T; 65 Ronald Leary G; 60 Connor McGovern C; 50 Patrick Morris C; 66 Dalton Risner G; 69 Jake Rodgers T; 71 Austin Schlottmann G; 68 Elijah Wilkinson T; Defensive linemen (DL): 92 Jonathan Harris DE; 96 Shelby Harris; 93 Dre'Mont Jones DE; 77 Kyle Peko NT; 98 Mike Purcell NT; 91 Deyon Sizer DE; 57 DeMarcus Walker DE	Linebackers (LB): 97 Jeremiah Attaochu OLB; 51 Todd Davis ILB; 52 Justin Hollins OLB; 47 Josey Jewell ILB; 45 A. J. Johnson ILB; 43 Joseph Jones ILB; 58 Von Miller OLB; 59 Malik Reed OLB; 54 Josh Watson ILB; Defensive backs (DB): 20 Duke Dawson CB; 25 Chris Harris Jr. CB; 27 Davontae Harris CB; 49 Alijah Holder FS; 36 Trey Marshall SS; 34 Will Parks SS; 31 Justin Simmons FS; 38 Shakial Taylor CB; 26 Isaac Yiadom CB; Special teams (ST): 42 Casey Kreiter LS; 8 Brandon McManus K; 6 Colby Wadman P	Practice squad: 67 Ka'John Armstrong T; 12 Trinity Benson WR; 53 Malik Carney OLB; 85 Bug Howard TE; 37 P. J. Locke SS; 16 Kelvin McKnight WR; 33 Khalfani Muhammad RB; 35 Tyvis Powell FS; 4 Brett Rypien QB; 74 Jay-Tee Tiuli NT; Reserve: 41 De'Vante Bausby CB (IR); 80 Jake Butt TE (IR); 29 Bryce Callahan CB (IR); 55 Bradley Chubb OLB (IR); 74 Nico Falah G (IR); 5 Joe Flacco QB (IR); 89 Austin Fort TE (IR); 99 Adam Gotsis DE (IR); 22 Kareem Jackson SS (Susp.); 32 Andy Janovich FB (IR); 39 Cyrus Jones CB (NF-Inj.); 56 Corey Nelson ILB (IR); 27 Horace Richardson CB (IR); 21 Theo Riddick RB (IR); 35 Dymonte Thomas FS (IR); 15 Juwann Winfree WR (IR); 90 Billy Winn DE (IR); 95 Derek Wolfe DE (IR); Rookies in italics 53 active, 18 reserve, 10 practice squad

== Preseason ==
The Broncos played the Atlanta Falcons in the Pro Football Hall of Fame Game on Thursday, August 1, at Tom Benson Hall of Fame Stadium in Canton, Ohio. The Broncos were represented by late owner Pat Bowlen, who died on June 13, as well as cornerback Champ Bailey. It marked the Broncos' fourth appearance in the game and the first since 2004, when John Elway was inducted into the Hall of Fame.

Week	Date	Opponent	Result	Record	Venue	Recap
HOF	August 1	vs. Atlanta Falcons	W 14–10	1–0	Tom Benson Hall of Fame Stadium	Recap
1	August 8	at Seattle Seahawks	L 14–22	1–1	CenturyLink Field	Recap
2	August 19	San Francisco 49ers	L 15–24	1–2	Broncos Stadium at Mile High	Recap
3	August 24	at Los Angeles Rams	L 6–10	1–3	Los Angeles Memorial Coliseum	Recap
4	August 29	Arizona Cardinals	W 20–7	2–3	Broncos Stadium at Mile High	Recap

== Regular season ==
=== Schedule ===
The Broncos' schedule was announced on April 17. This marked the first time since 2010 in which the Broncos opened the season on the road.

Week	Date	Opponent	Result	Record	Venue	Recap
1	September 9	at **Oakland Raiders**	**L** 16–24	0–1	RingCentral Coliseum	Recap
2	September 15	Chicago Bears	**L** 14–16	0–2	Empower Field at Mile High	Recap
3	September 22	at Green Bay Packers	**L** 16–27	0–3	Lambeau Field	Recap
4	September 29	Jacksonville Jaguars	**L** 24–26	0–4	Empower Field at Mile High	Recap
5	October 6	at **Los Angeles Chargers**	**W** 20–13	1–4	Dignity Health Sports Park	Recap
6	October 13	Tennessee Titans	**W** 16–0	2–4	Empower Field at Mile High	Recap
7	October 17	**Kansas City Chiefs**	**L** 6–30	2–5	Empower Field at Mile High	Recap
8	October 27	at Indianapolis Colts	**L** 13–15	2–6	Lucas Oil Stadium	Recap
9	November 3	Cleveland Browns	**W** 24–19	3–6	Empower Field at Mile High	Recap
10	Bye					
11	November 17	at Minnesota Vikings	**L** 23–27	3–7	U.S. Bank Stadium	Recap
12	November 24	at Buffalo Bills	**L** 3–20	3–8	New Era Field	Recap
13	December 1	**Los Angeles Chargers**	**W** 23–20	4–8	Empower Field at Mile High	Recap
14	December 8	at Houston Texans	**W** 38–24	5–8	NRG Stadium	Recap
15	December 15	at **Kansas City Chiefs**	**L** 3–23	5–9	Arrowhead Stadium	Recap
16	December 22	Detroit Lions	**W** 27–17	6–9	Empower Field at Mile High	Recap
17	December 29	**Oakland Raiders**	**W** 16–15	7–9	Empower Field at Mile High	Recap

Note: Intra-division opponents are in bold text.

=== Game summaries ===
==== Week 1: at Oakland Raiders ====
Week One: Denver Broncos at Oakland Raiders – Game summary

Quarter	1	2	3	4	Total
Broncos	0	0	6	10	**16**
**Raiders**	7	7	0	10	**24**

at RingCentral Coliseum, Oakland, California

- Date: September 9
- Game time: 8:20 p.m. MDT/7:20 p.m. PDT
- Game weather: Breezy, 68 °F (20 °C)
- Game attendance: 52,359
- Referee: Craig Wrolstad
- TV announcers (ESPN): Steve Levy, Brian Griese, Louis Riddick and Dianna Russini
- Recap, Game Book

Game information

**First quarter**

- OAK – Tyrell Williams 8-yard pass from Derek Carr (Daniel Carlson kick), 8:52. Raiders 7–0. **Drive: 10 plays, 72 yards, 6:08.**

**Second quarter**

- OAK – Josh Jacobs 2-yard run (Daniel Carlson kick), 3:30. Raiders 14–0. **Drive: 13 plays, 95 yards, 8:35.**

**Third quarter**

- DEN – Brandon McManus 26-yard field goal, 9:20. Raiders 14–3. **Drive: 12 plays, 67 yards, 5:40.**
- DEN – Brandon McManus 26-yard field goal, 3:42. Raiders 14–6. **Drive: 10 plays, 68 yards, 3:21.**

**Fourth quarter**

- OAK – Josh Jacobs 4-yard run (Daniel Carlson kick), 11:52. Raiders 21–6. **Drive: 5 plays, 60 yards, 2:59.**
- DEN – Brandon McManus 39-yard field goal, 8:39. Raiders 21–9. **Drive: 6 plays, 54 yards, 3:13.**
- OAK – Daniel Carlson 29-yard field goal, 4:38. Raiders 24–9. **Drive: 6 plays, 19 yards, 4:01.**
- DEN – Emmanuel Sanders 1-yard pass from Joe Flacco (Brandon McManus kick), 2:15. Raiders 24–16. **Drive: 8 plays, 75 yards, 2:23.**

**Top passers**

- DEN – Joe Flacco – 21/31, 268 yards, TD
- OAK – Derek Carr – 22/26, 259 yards, TD

**Top rushers**

- DEN – Royce Freeman – 10 rushes, 56 yards
- OAK – Josh Jacobs – 23 rushes, 85 yards, 2 TD

**Top receivers**

- DEN – Courtland Sutton – 7 receptions, 120 yards
- OAK – Tyrell Williams – 6 receptions, 105 yards, TD

In the season opener, the Broncos made their final visit to Oakland, prior to the Raiders' relocation to Las Vegas for 2020. The Broncos fell behind 14–0 in the first half against the Raiders on Monday Night Football. On the game's opening drive, Raiders' quarterback Derek Carr threw an 8-yard touchdown pass to wide receiver Tyrell Williams, and running back Josh Jacobs added a 2-yard touchdown run in the second quarter. Broncos placekicker Brandon McManus missed short on a 63-yard field goal attempt just before halftime. The Broncos reached the red zone on their first three possessions of the second half, but were forced to settle for field goals by McManus on each drive—two 26-yarders in the third quarter and a 39-yarder midway through the fourth quarter. Wide receiver DaeSean Hamilton dropped a potential touchdown pass on the second drive. Following the second field goal, the Raiders increased their lead to 21–6, with Jacobs' second touchdown run of the game (a 4-yarder), and then to 24–9, with a 29-yard field goal by placekicker Daniel Carlson at the 4:41 mark of the third quarter. After three red zone attempts that all resulted in short field goals, the Broncos finally reached the end zone with 2:18 remaining in the fourth quarter. Joe Flacco, in his debut as the Broncos' starting quarterback, connected on a 1–yard touchdown pass to wide receiver Emmanuel Sanders to narrow the Raiders' lead to 24–16. However, the Broncos were unable to prevent the Raiders from running out the clock. With the loss, the Broncos opened the season at 0–1 for the first time since 2011, which was also a loss to the Raiders on Monday Night Football.

==== Week 2: vs. Chicago Bears ====
Week Two: Chicago Bears at Denver Broncos – Game summary

Quarter	1	2	3	4	Total
**Bears**	0	6	7	3	**16**
Broncos	3	0	0	11	**14**

at Empower Field at Mile High, Denver, Colorado

- Date: September 15
- Game time: 2:25 pm. MDT
- Game weather: Mostly sunny, 87 °F (31 °C)
- Game attendance: 76,885
- Referee: Adrian Hill
- TV announcers (Fox): Dick Stockton, Mark Schlereth and Jennifer Hale
- Recap, Game Book

Game information

**First quarter**

- DEN – Brandon McManus 43-yard field goal, 9:45. Broncos 3–0. **Drive: 10 plays, 50 yards, 5:15.**

**Second quarter**

- CHI – Eddy Piñeiro 40-yard field goal, 13:35. Tied 3–3. **Drive: 14 plays, 64 yards, 7:28.**
- CHI – Eddy Piñeiro 52-yard field goal, 5:10. Bears 6–3. **Drive: 10 plays, 56 yards, 4:26.**

**Third quarter**

- CHI – David Montgomery 1-yard run (Eddy Piñeiro kick), 1:14. Bears 13–3. **Drive: 9 plays, 80 yards, 5:30.**

**Fourth quarter**

- DEN – Brandon McManus 32-yard field goal, 13:37. Bears 13–6. **Drive: 9 plays, 61 yards, 2:37.**
- DEN – Emmanuel Sanders 7-yard pass from Joe Flacco (Joe Flacco–Emmanuel Sanders pass), 0:31. Broncos 14–13. **Drive: 12 plays, 62 yards, 2:17.**
- CHI – Eddy Piñeiro 53-yard field goal, 0:00. Bears 16–14. **Drive: 6 plays, 40 yards, 0:31.**

**Top passers**

- CHI – Mitchell Trubisky – 16/27, 120 yards
- DEN – Joe Flacco – 35/50, 292 yards, TD, INT

**Top rushers**

- CHI – David Montgomery – 18 rushes, 62 yards, TD
- DEN – Royce Freeman – 11 rushes, 54 yards

**Top receivers**

- CHI – Allen Robinson – 4 receptions, 41 yards
- DEN – Emmanuel Sanders – 11 receptions, 98 yards, TD

In the Broncos' home opener, the only points of the first half came by way of field goals—a 43-yarder by Broncos' placekicker Brandon McManus on the game's opening drive, and 43- and 52-yarders by Bears' placekicker Eddy Piñeiro in the second quarter. The Bears increased their lead to 13–3 late in the third quarter, with running back David Montgomery diving for a 1-yard touchdown. For a second consecutive week, the Broncos were held without a touchdown for the first three-quarters, and were once again plagued by red-zone woes. The Broncos reached the red zone early in the fourth quarter, but were forced to settle on a 32-yard field goal by McManus to pull to within a 13–6 deficit. After forcing a Bears' punt, the Broncos were attempting to tie the game and reached the Bears' 2-yard line with 4:51 remaining; however, quarterback Joe Flacco was intercepted by Bears' cornerback Kyle Fuller. The Broncos forced another Bears' punt, and got the football back at their own 38-yard line with 2:48 remaining in the game. After burning all of their timeouts, the Broncos finally reached the end zone with 37 seconds remaining, with Flacco connecting with wide receiver Emmanuel Sanders on a 7-yard touchdown pass. The Broncos were initially planning to go for the two-point conversion, but a delay-of-game penalty pushed them back five yards. The Broncos then attempted the game-tying extra point, which McManus missed wide right; however, Bears' cornerback Buster Skrine was whistled for an offsides penalty. The Broncos attempted another two-point conversion, which was successful, with a Flacco completion to Sanders. The Bears had one final drive, which began at their own 25-yard line with 31 seconds remaining. On the first play, Broncos' linebacker Bradley Chubb was whistled for a questionable roughing the passer penalty on Bears' quarter Mitchell Trubisky, which added 15 yards to a 5-yard completion to tight end Trey Burton. After three consecutive incomplete passes and a 5-yard penalty for having too many men on the field, the Bears faced a 4th-and-15 from their own 40-yard line. Trubisky completed a 25-yard pass to wide receiver Allen Robinson in the middle of the field to the Broncos' 35-yard line, and the Bears' final timeout was called with one second remaining. This set up the game-winning 53-yard field goal by Piñeiro as time expired.

==== Week 3: at Green Bay Packers ====
Week Three: Denver Broncos at Green Bay Packers – Game summary

Quarter	1	2	3	4	Total
Broncos	0	10	6	0	**16**
**Packers**	7	10	7	3	**27**

at Lambeau Field, Green Bay, Wisconsin

- Date: September 22
- Game time: 12:00 p.m. CDT/11:00 am. MDT
- Game weather: Rain, 69 °F (21 °C)
- Game attendance: 78,078
- Referee: Brad Rogers
- TV announcers (Fox): Chris Myers, Daryl Johnston and Laura Okmin
- Recap, Game Book

Game information

**First quarter**

- GB – Marquez Valdes-Scantling 40-yard pass from Aaron Rodgers (Mason Crosby kick), 12:16. Packers 7–0. **Drive: 5 plays, 75 yards, 2:44.**

**Second quarter**

- DEN – Phillip Lindsay 1-yard run (Brandon McManus kick), 14:18. Tied 7–7. **Drive: 15 plays, 77 yards, 8:35.**
- GB – Mason Crosby 42-yard field goal, 11:19. Packers 10–7. **Drive: 7 plays, 51 yards, 2:59.**
- DEN – Brandon McManus 30-yard field goal, 3:50. Tied 10–10. **Drive: 15 plays, 63 yards, 7:29.**
- GB – Aaron Jones 7-yard run (Mason Crosby kick), 1:56. Packers 17–10. **Drive: 2 plays, 5 yards, 0:21.**

**Third quarter**

- GB – Aaron Jones 1-yard run (Mason Crosby kick), 12:09. Packers 24–10. **Drive: 4 plays, 37 yards, 1:35.**
- DEN – Phillip Lindsay 1-yard run (kick failed, hit left upright), 5:59. Packers 24–16. **Drive: 12 plays, 75 yards, 6:10.**

**Fourth quarter**

- GB – Mason Crosby 41-yard field goal, 5:49. Packers 27–16. **Drive: 11 plays, 51 yards, 7:41.**

**Top passers**

- DEN – Joe Flacco – 20/29, 213 yards, INT
- GB – Aaron Rodgers – 17/29, 235 yards, TD

**Top rushers**

- DEN – Phillip Lindsay – 21 rushes, 81 yards, 2 TD
- GB – Jamaal Williams – 12 rushes, 59 yards

**Top receivers**

- DEN – Courtland Sutton – 5 receptions, 87 yards
- GB – Marquez Valdes-Scantling – 6 receptions, 99 yards, TD

On the game's opening drive, Packers quarterback Aaron Rodgers launched a 40-yard touchdown pass to wide receiver Marquez Valdes-Scantling. Broncos return specialist Diontae Spencer returned the ensuing kickoff to the Packers' 43-yard line, but the Broncos' offense went three-and-out on their initial possession. After forcing a Green Bay punt, the Broncos pulled even early in the second quarter, with running back Phillip Lindsay rushing for a 1-yard touchdown. The next two scoring plays came from each placekicker—a 42-yard field goal by the Packers' Mason Crosby, followed by one from 30 yards by the Broncos' Brandon McManus. The Broncos suffered turnovers on two of their next three possessions, and the Packers capitalized as a result. First, Broncos quarterback Joe Flacco was strip-sacked by Packers linebacker Preston Smith at the Denver 5-yard line. The Packers reclaimed the lead just before halftime, with a 7-yard touchdown run by running back Aaron Jones. Then early in the third quarter, linebacker Jaire Alexander forced a fumble off Broncos tight end Noah Fant at the Denver 37-yard line, and Jones' second rushing touchdown—from 1 yard out—increased the Packers' lead to 24–10. The Broncos responded with a 12-play, 75-yard drive, with Lindsay's second 1-yard touchdown run—this one on a 4th-and-goal. However, McManus hit the left upright on his extra point attempt, leaving the score at 24–16. After forcing the Packers to punt, the Broncos advanced to the Green Bay 38-yard line late in the third quarter; however, Flacco was intercepted by safety Darnell Savage Jr. The Packers increased their lead to 27–16 with less than 6 minutes to play, thanks to a 41-yard field goal by Crosby. The Broncos had two more possessions, but could not reach midfield on either drive—both ending with Flacco getting sacked and turning over the football on downs. Flacco was sacked six times, and for a third consecutive game, the Broncos' defense failed to record a sack or force a turnover. The Broncos suffered their first 0–3 start since 1999. With the loss, the Broncos dropped to 0–6–1 in road games against the Packers, going 0–5 at Lambeau Field and 0–1–1 in two meetings in Milwaukee. To date, the Packers remain as the only team that the Broncos have never defeated on the road in their franchise history.

==== Week 4: vs. Jacksonville Jaguars ====
Week Four: Jacksonville Jaguars at Denver Broncos – Game summary

Quarter	1	2	3	4	Total
**Jaguars**	3	3	14	6	**26**
Broncos	7	10	0	7	**24**

at Empower Field at Mile High, Denver, Colorado

- Date: September 29
- Game time: 2:25 pm. MDT
- Game weather: Sunny, 87 °F (31 °C)
- Game attendance: 76,219
- Referee: Ronald Torbert
- TV announcers (CBS): Andrew Catalon and James Lofton
- Recap, Game Book

Game information

**First quarter**

- DEN – Noah Fant 25-yard pass from Joe Flacco (Brandon McManus kick), 8:17. Broncos 7–0. **Drive: 2 plays, 53 yards, 0:50.**
- JAX – Josh Lambo 25-yard field goal, 3:13. Broncos 7–3. **Drive: 10 plays, 68 yards, 5:04.**

**Second quarter**

- DEN – Courtland Sutton 7-yard pass from Joe Flacco (Brandon McManus kick), 13:39. Broncos 14–3. **Drive: 6 plays, 69 yards, 2:32.**
- DEN – Brandon McManus 33-yard field goal, 4:16. Broncos 17–3. **Drive: 11 plays, 49 yards, 4:27.**
- JAX – Josh Lambo 40-yard field goal, 0:08. Broncos 17–6. **Drive: 7 plays, 21 yards, 0:41.**

**Third quarter**

- JAX – Ryquell Armstead 7-yard pass from Gardner Minshew (Josh Lambo kick), 4:36. Broncos 17–13. **Drive: 16 plays, 75 yards, 10:24.**
- JAX – James O'Shaughnessy 18-yard pass from Gardner Minshew (Josh Lambo kick), 1:10. Jaguars 20–17. **Drive: 3 plays, 93 yards, 1:47.**

**Fourth quarter**

- JAX – Josh Lambo 34-yard field goal, 2:54. Jaguars 23–17. **Drive: 13 plays, 78 yards, 7:00.**
- DEN – Courtland Sutton 8-yard pass from Joe Flacco (Brandon McManus kick), 1:32. Broncos 24–23. **Drive: 6 plays, 75 yards, 1:22.**
- JAX – Josh Lambo 33-yard field goal, 0:00. Jaguars 26–24. **Drive: 8 plays, 60 yards, 1:32.**

**Top passers**

- JAX – Gardner Minshew – 19/33, 213 yards, 2 TD
- DEN – Joe Flacco – 22/38, 303 yards, 3 TD, INT

**Top rushers**

- JAX – Leonard Fournette – 29 rushes, 225 yards
- DEN – Phillip Lindsay – 9 rushes, 53 yards

**Top receivers**

- JAX – Dede Westbrook – 5 receptions, 66 yards
- DEN – Emmanuel Sanders – 5 receptions, 104 yards

The Broncos grabbed a 17–3 lead over the Jaguars by the second quarter, with quarterback Joe Flacco throwing a pair of touchdown passes—a 25-yarder to tight end Noah Fant in the first quarter followed by a 7-yarder to wide receiver Courtland Sutton in the second quarter, and placekicker Brandon McManus adding a 33-yard field goal. The Broncos reached the Jaguars' 33-yard line 1:05 remaining until halftime, and were attempting to add to their lead; however, Flacco was intercepted by Jaguars' safety Ronnie Harrison, who advance the football to the Broncos' 43-yard line. This set up a 40-yard field goal by placekicker Josh Lambo just before halftime. On the opening possession of the second half, the Jaguars pulled to within a 17–13 deficit, with a 16-play, 75-yard drive, culminating in a 7-yard touchdown pass from quarterback Gardner Minshew to running back Ryquell Armstead. After the Broncos went three-and-out on their first possession of the second half, the Jaguars took a 20–17 lead, with Minshew, starting in place of the injured Nick Foles, connecting on an 18-yard touchdown pass to tight end James O'Shaughnessy. The key play of the drive was an 81-yard run by running back Leonard Fournette. With 9:54 remaining in the fourth quarter, the Jaguars assembled a 13-play, 78-yard drive, with a 34-yard field goal by Lambo to increase the Jaguars lead to 23–17 with three minutes remaining. Six plays later, and with only one timeout remaining, the Broncos took a 24–23 lead, with Flacco throwing his third touchdown pass of the game—an 8-yarder to Sutton with 1:38 remaining. However, for the second time in three weeks, the Broncos were unable to prevent a game-winning drive by their opponent. On the second play of the Jaguars' game-winning drive, linebacker Von Miller was whistled for a roughing the passer penalty after the Broncos forced their first fumble of the season. Lambo kicked the game-winning 32-yard field goal as time expired. After failing to record a sack in their first three games, the Broncos sacked Minshew five times, including two by Von Miller, who reached 100 career sacks in his 124th game, the fourth-fastest player to reach that landmark. With the loss, the Broncos suffered their first 0–4 start since 1999.

==== Week 5: at Los Angeles Chargers ====
Week Five: Denver Broncos at Los Angeles Chargers – Game summary

Quarter	1	2	3	4	Total
**Broncos**	14	3	0	3	**20**
Chargers	0	0	7	6	**13**

at Dignity Health Sports Park, Carson, California

- Date: October 6
- Game time: 2:05 pm. MDT/1:05 pm. PDT
- Game weather: Sunny, 85 °F (29 °C)
- Game attendance: 25,357
- Referee: Shawn Hochuli
- TV announcers (CBS): Jim Nantz, Tony Romo and Tracy Wolfson
- Recap, Game Book

Game information

**First quarter**

- DEN – Phillip Lindsay 4-yard run (Brandon McManus kick), 11:06. Broncos 7–0. **Drive: 7 plays, 75 yards, 3:54.**
- DEN – Courtland Sutton 70-yard pass from Joe Flacco (Brandon McManus kick), 4:58. Broncos 14–0. **Drive: 5 plays, 81 yards, 2:17.**

**Second quarter**

- DEN – Brandon McManus 40-yard field goal, 5:17. Broncos 17–0. **Drive: 8 plays, 40 yards, 3:27.**

**Third quarter**

- LAC – Desmond King 68-yard punt return (Chase McLaughlin kick), 0:31. Broncos 17–7.

**Fourth quarter**

- LAC – Chase McLaughlin 45-yard field goal, 6:47. Broncos 17–10. **Drive: 4 plays, 29 yards, 2:08.**
- DEN – Brandon McManus 46-yard field goal, 1:55. Broncos 20–10. **Drive: 5 plays, 41 yards, 1:25.**
- LAC – Chase McLaughlin 32-yard field goal, 0:10. Broncos 20–13. **Drive: 8 plays, 61 yards, 1:45.**

**Top passers**

- DEN – Joe Flacco – 14/20, 182 yards, TD, INT
- LAC – Philip Rivers – 32/48, 211 yards, 2 INT

**Top rushers**

- DEN – Phillip Lindsay – 15 rushes, 114 yards, TD
- LAC – Melvin Gordon – 12 rushes, 31 yards

**Top receivers**

- DEN – Courtland Sutton – 4 receptions, 92 yards, TD
- LAC – Austin Ekeler – 15 receptions, 86 yards

The Broncos jumped out to a 14–0 lead over the Chargers on their first two offensive possessions, courtesy of a 4-yard touchdown run by running back Phillip Lindsay, followed by a 70-yard touchdown pass from quarterback Joe Flacco to wide receiver Courtland Sutton. The Broncos reached the Chargers' 29-yard line on their third possession, but Flacco was strip-sacked by linebacker Uchenna Nwosu on the first play of the second quarter, with linebacker Jatavis Brown recovering the fumble. The Chargers managed to get to the Denver 16-yard line on their ensuing possession, but quarterback Philip Rivers was flagged for intentional grounding on a 3rd-and-5, with the penalty pushing them back to the 30-yard line. The ensuing 48-yard field goal attempt from Chase McLaughlin was blocked by Broncos' defensive end Dre'Mont Jones. The Broncos increased their lead to 17–0 on their next possession, with a 40-yard field goal by Brandon McManus. The Chargers reached the Broncos' 1-yard line with seven seconds remaining before halftime, with Rivers completing a short pass to running back Austin Ekeler near the left sideline. However, Broncos' safety Kareem Jackson forced a fumble before Ekeler could break the plane of the goal line near the pylon, and the football went out of the corner of the end zone for a touchback, keeping the Chargers scoreless.

After a series of punts to start the second half, the two teams exchanged turnovers. First, with the Broncos backed up near their own goal line, Flacco was intercepted on a deflected pass by linebacker Kyzir White, giving the Chargers a very short field at the 7-yard line. Three plays later, the Broncos returned the favor, with linebacker A. J. Johnson intercepting Rivers in the end zone for a touchback. After the Broncos went three-and-out, the Chargers finally got on the scoreboard with 49 seconds remaining in the third quarter, with Desmond King returning a punt 51 yards for a touchdown—the Chargers' only touchdown of the game. After McManus missed wide left on a 54-yard field goal attempt, the Chargers narrowed the Broncos' lead to 17–10, with a 45-yard field goal by McLaughlin. Following an exchange of punts, a 46-yard field goal by McManus increased the Broncos' lead to 20–10 at the two-minute warning. The Chargers attempted a rally, with a 32-yard field goal by McLaughlin with only 15 seconds remaining. However, the onside kick attempt was unsuccessful, giving the Broncos their first win of the season and snapping an eight-game losing streak dating back to last season. In addition, the Broncos earned their 500th win in franchise history and avoided their first ever 0–5 start. This was also the third and final meeting between the two teams at Dignity Health Sports Park—the Chargers' temporary home field, prior to the Chargers' move to SoFi Stadium in Inglewood for the 2020 season.

==== Week 6: vs. Tennessee Titans ====
Week Six: Tennessee Titans at Denver Broncos – Game summary

Quarter	1	2	3	4	Total
Titans	0	0	0	0	**0**
**Broncos**	3	3	7	3	**16**

at Empower Field at Mile High, Denver, Colorado

- Date: October 13
- Game time: 2:25 pm. MDT
- Game weather: Sunny, 69 °F (21 °C)
- Game attendance: 75,815
- Referee: Alex Kemp
- TV announcers (CBS): Andrew Catalon, James Lofton and John Schriffen
- Recap, Game Book

Game information

**First quarter**

- DEN – Brandon McManus 31-yard field goal, 10:16. Broncos 3–0. **Drive: 8 plays, 32 yards, 3:04.**

**Second quarter**

- DEN – Brandon McManus 53-yard field goal, 4:40. Broncos 6–0. **Drive: 5 plays, 50 yards, 2:44.**

**Third quarter**

- DEN – Phillip Lindsay 2-yard run (Brandon McManus kick), 4:56. Broncos 13–0. **Drive: 6 plays, 41 yards, 3:10.**

**Fourth quarter**

- DEN – Brandon McManus 48-yard field goal, 4:53. Broncos 16–0. **Drive: 8 plays, 49 yards, 4:17.**

**Top passers**

- TEN – Ryan Tannehill – 13/16, 144 yards, INT
- DEN – Joe Flacco – 18/28, 177 yards, INT

**Top rushers**

- TEN – Derrick Henry – 15 rushes, 28 yards
- DEN – Phillip Lindsay – 15 rushes, 70 yards, TD

**Top receivers**

- TEN – Adam Humphries – 6 receptions, 47 yards
- DEN – Courtland Sutton – 4 receptions, 76 yards

The Broncos' defense recorded seven sacks, three interceptions, and for the second consecutive week, did not allow an offensive touchdown, in a 16–0 shutout win over the Titans. The only points of the first half came courtesy of two field goals by placekicker Brandon McManus—a 31-yarder in the first quarter and a 53-yarder in the second. A 2-yard touchdown run by running back Phillip Lindsay increased the Broncos' lead to 13–0 late in the third quarter. Titans quarterback Marcus Mariota was benched midway through the third quarter following a poor performance that included two interceptions, and was replaced by backup quarterback Ryan Tannehill. The Titans' offense did not advance past midfield until the fourth quarter, and reached the Broncos' 13-yard line with 9:22 remaining; however, Tannehill was sacked by defensive end DeMarcus Walker on a 4th-and-4. A 48-yard field goal by McManus increased the Broncos' lead to 16–0 with 4:57 remaining in the game. The Titans had one last offensive possession, and reached the Broncos' 5-yard line at the two-minute warning. Following an offensive holding penalty, a 10-yard sack of Tannehill by defensive tackle Derek Wolfe and an 18-yard pass completion from Tannehill to tight end Delanie Walker to the 12-yard line, Tannehill was intercepted by cornerback Kareem Jackson near the goal line, ending the Titans' rally attempt and preserving the shutout. Both teams' offenses went a combined 4-for-28 (.143) on third down—2-for-14 by each team. With this win the Broncos became only the second team originating in the American Football League to reach 500 career wins.

==== Week 7: vs. Kansas City Chiefs ====
Week Seven: Kansas City Chiefs at Denver Broncos – Game summary

Quarter	1	2	3	4	Total
**Chiefs**	10	10	7	3	**30**
Broncos	6	0	0	0	**6**

at Empower Field at Mile High, Denver, Colorado

- Date: October 17
- Game time: 6:20 pm. MDT
- Game weather: Mostly cloudy, 75 °F (24 °C)
- Game attendance: 76,748
- Referee: Shawn Smith
- TV announcers (Fox/NFLN/Amazon Prime): Joe Buck, Troy Aikman, Erin Andrews and Kristina Pink
- Recap, Game Book

Game information

**First quarter**

- DEN – Royce Freeman 1-yard run (run failed), 9:06. Broncos 6–0. **Drive: 10 plays, 75 yards, 5:54.**
- KC – Mecole Hardman 21-yard pass from Patrick Mahomes (Harrison Butker kick), 4:10. Chiefs 7–6. **Drive: 8 plays, 75 yards, 4:56.**
- KC – Harrison Butker 33-yard field goal, 1:00. Chiefs 10–6. **Drive: 4 plays, 6 yards, 1:31.**

**Second quarter**

- KC – Harrison Butker 20-yard field goal, 8:01. Chiefs 13–6. **Drive: 13 plays, 37 yards, 6:53.**
- KC – Reggie Ragland 5-yard fumble return (Harrison Butker kick), 7:10. Chiefs 20–6.

**Third quarter**

- KC – Tyreek Hill 57-yard pass from Matt Moore (Harrison Butker kick), 4:20. Chiefs 27–6. **Drive: 2 plays, 73 yards, 0:40.**

**Fourth quarter**

- KC – Harrison Butker 39-yard field goal, 5:04. Chiefs 30–6. **Drive: 5 plays, 30 yards, 3:06.**

**Top passers**

- KC – Matt Moore – 10/19, 117 yards, TD
- DEN – Joe Flacco – 21/34, 213 yards

**Top rushers**

- KC – LeSean McCoy – 12 rushes, 64 yards
- DEN – Phillip Lindsay – 11 rushes, 36 yards

**Top receivers**

- KC – Tyreek Hill – 3 receptions, 74 yards, TD
- DEN – Courtland Sutton – 6 receptions, 87 yards

The Broncos assembled a 10-play, 75-yard drive on the game's opening possession, which culminated in a 1-yard touchdown run by running back Royce Freeman. The drive was aided by a pair of penalties against the Chiefs' defense on two third-down plays. The Broncos elected for a two-point conversion attempt at the 1-yard line following an offside penalty against the Chiefs on the extra-point attempt. However, running back Phillip Lindsay was denied by the Chiefs' defense, and it was all downhill for the Broncos after that, as the Chiefs scored the final 30 points of the game. First, quarterback Patrick Mahomes connected on a 21-yard touchdown pass to wide receiver Mecole Hardman, which was followed by a pair of field goals by placekicker Harrison Butker—a 33-yarder near the end of the first quarter and a 20-yarder midway through the second. Between the two field goals, Mahomes left the game with a dislocated patella and Broncos' punter Colby Wadman was sacked on a fake punt attempt. The Chiefs' defense then strip-sacked Broncos' quarterback Joe Flacco, with linebacker Reggie Ragland returning it 5 yards for a touchdown and a 20–6 halftime lead. Mahomes was replaced by backup quarterback Matt Moore, who launched a 57-yard touchdown pass to wide receiver Tyreek Hill in the third quarter, and Butker later added a 39-yard field goal in the fourth. After Broncos' placekicker Brandon McManus missed wide right on a 45-yard field goal attempt late in the second quarter, the Broncos' offense did not advance past the midfield line for the remainder of the game. In addition, Flacco was sacked nine times by the Chiefs' defense, and for a second consecutive week, the Broncos' offense performed poorly on third down, going 1-for-13 (.077).

==== Week 8: at Indianapolis Colts ====
Week Eight: Denver Broncos at Indianapolis Colts – Game summary

Quarter	1	2	3	4	Total
Broncos	0	6	7	0	**13**
**Colts**	0	3	9	3	**15**

at Lucas Oil Stadium, Indianapolis, Indiana

- Date: October 27
- Game time: 1:00 p.m. EDT/11:00 am. MDT
- Game weather: Mostly sunny, 55 °F (13 °C) (retractable roof open)
- Game attendance: 61,653
- Referee: Walt Anderson
- TV announcers (CBS): Ian Eagle, Dan Fouts and Evan Washburn
- Recap, Game Book

Game information

**First quarter**

- No scoring plays.

**Second quarter**

- DEN – Brandon McManus 21-yard field goal, 12:56. Broncos 3–0. **Drive: 17 plays, 86 yards, 7:45.**
- DEN – Brandon McManus 29-yard field goal, 5:33. Broncos 6–0. **Drive: 13 plays, 73 yards, 5:38.**
- IND – Adam Vinatieri 55-yard field goal, 0:02. Broncos 6–3. **Drive: 6 plays, 43 yards, 0:55.**

**Third quarter**

- DEN – Royce Freeman 4-yard run (Brandon McManus kick), 11:38. Broncos 13–3. **Drive: 5 plays, 75 yards, 3:22.**
- IND – Adam Vinatieri 45-yard field goal, 6:05. Broncos 13–6. **Drive: 12 plays, 48 yards, 5:33.**
- IND – Marlon Mack 10-yard run (kick failed), 2:26. Broncos 13–12. **Drive: 6 plays, 68 yards, 2:44.**

**Fourth quarter**

- IND – Adam Vinatieri 51-yard field goal, 0:02. Colts 15–13. **Drive: 7 plays, 56 yards, 1:26.**

**Top passers**

- DEN – Joe Flacco – 20/32, 174 yards
- IND – Jacoby Brissett – 15/25, 202 yards

**Top rushers**

- DEN – Phillip Lindsay – 14 rushes, 59 yards
- IND – Marlon Mack – 19 rushes, 76 yards, TD

**Top receivers**

- DEN – Courtland Sutton – 3 receptions, 72 yards
- IND – Jack Doyle – 4 receptions, 61 yards

After a scoreless first quarter, the Broncos failed to capitalize on two red zone opportunities, settling for a pair of short field goals by placekicker Brandon McManus in the second quarter—from 21 and 29 yards out. Colts' placekicker Adam Vinatieri, who missed wide-right on a 45-yard field goal attempt on the game's opening drive, kicked a 55-yard field goal at the end of the first half. The Broncos took the opening possession of the second half, and increased their lead to 13–3, with running back Royce Freeman rushing for a 4-yard touchdown. However, the Broncos were held scoreless for the remainder of the game. After a 45-yard field goal by Vinatieri, Colts' running back Marlon Mack rushed for a 10-yard touchdown. However, Vinatieri missed wide-left on the extra-point attempt, keeping the score at 13–12. After an exchange of punts, which included the Broncos nearly blocking a punt in the Colts' end zone, Broncos' defensive end Derek Wolfe forced a fumble off Colts' quarterback Jacoby Brissett near midfield and midway through the fourth quarter; however, the Broncos were unable to capitalize, going three-and-out. The Broncos failed to convert a 3rd-and-5 at the Colts' 43-yard line at the two-minute warning, giving the Colts the football on their own 11-yard line. On the first play, Brissett evaded a sack by linebacker Von Miller, and completed a 35-yard pass to wide receiver T. Y. Hilton on the right sideline that was reviewed, but upheld by instant replay. A personal foul horse-collar tackle penalty on linebacker A. J. Johnson added 15-yards to a 5-yard pass completion from Brissett to running back Nyheim Hines. Four plays later, Vinatieri atoned for the aforementioned missed field goal and extra-point attempts by kicking the go-ahead 51-yard field goal with 26 seconds remaining. Without any timeouts, the Broncos had two offensive plays at their own 24-yard line, but failed to gain any yardage on either play. With the loss, the Broncos started with a 2–6 record for only the third time in franchise history—1983 and 2010 are the other two seasons.

==== Week 9: vs. Cleveland Browns ====
Week Nine: Cleveland Browns at Denver Broncos – Game summary

Quarter	1	2	3	4	Total
Browns	0	12	0	7	**19**
**Broncos**	7	10	7	0	**24**

at Empower Field at Mile High, Denver, Colorado

- Date: November 3
- Game time: 2:25 pm. MST
- Game weather: Mostly Cloudy, 55 °F (13 °C)
- Game attendance: 76,743
- Referee: Bill Vinovich
- TV announcers (CBS): Kevin Harlan, Rich Gannon and Jay Feely
- Recap, Game Book

Game information

**First quarter**

- DEN – Courtland Sutton 21-yard pass from Brandon Allen (Brandon McManus kick), 6:09. Broncos 7–0. **Drive: 9 plays, 63 yards, 4:47.**

**Second quarter**

- CLE – Austin Seibert 39-yard field goal, 12:48. Broncos 7–3. **Drive: 5 plays, 19 yards, 2:20.**
- DEN – Noah Fant 75-yard pass from Brandon Allen (Brandon McManus kick), 12:34. Broncos 14–3. **Drive: 1 play, 75 yards, 0:14.**
- CLE – Austin Seibert 30-yard field goal, 7:14. Broncos 14–6. **Drive: 9 plays, 64 yards, 5:20.**
- CLE – Austin Seibert 27-yard field goal, 3:49. Broncos 14–9. **Drive: 6 plays, 9 yards, 2:22.**
- DEN – Brandon McManus 43-yard field goal, 1:47. Broncos 17–9. **Drive: 5 plays, 43 yards, 2:02.**
- CLE – Austin Seibert 30-yard field goal, 0:15. Broncos 17–12. **Drive: 13 plays, 63 yards, 1:32.**

**Third quarter**

- DEN – Phillip Lindsay 30-yard run (Brandon McManus kick), 1:06. Broncos 24–12. **Drive: 7 plays, 95 yards, 4:10.**

**Fourth quarter**

- CLE – Jarvis Landry 9-yard pass from Baker Mayfield (Austin Seibert kick), 10:47. Broncos 24–19. **Drive: 9 plays, 76 yards, 5:19.**

**Top passers**

- CLE – Baker Mayfield – 27/42, 273 yards, TD
- DEN – Brandon Allen – 12/20, 193 yards, 2 TD

**Top rushers**

- CLE – Nick Chubb – 20 rushes, 65 yards
- DEN – Phillip Lindsay – 9 rushes, 92 yards, TD

**Top receivers**

- CLE – Odell Beckham Jr. – 5 receptions, 87 yards
- DEN – Noah Fant – 3 receptions, 115 yards, TD

Two days after quarterback Joe Flacco was placed on injured reserve, backup quarterback Brandon Allen got the start for the Broncos. He threw two touchdown passes—the first one to wide receiver Courtland Sutton for 21 yards in the first quarter, and the second one a 75-yarder to tight end Noah Fant early in the second quarter. The Broncos' defense yielded four red zone opportunities by the Browns' offense in the second quarter, but forced the Browns to settle for four field goals by placekicker Austin Seibert in the second quarter—the third one occurred after the Browns' defense forced a fumble deep in Broncos' territory. Broncos' placekicker Brandon McManus added a 43-yard field goal just after the two-minute warning for a 17–12 halftime lead. The Broncos' defense subdued the Browns on another red zone opportunity at the 5:23 mark of the third quarter, with linebackers Todd Davis and Von Miller denying Browns' quarterback Baker Mayfield on a 4th-and-1 at the 5-yard line. The Browns unsuccessfully challenged the ruling on the field, and seven plays later, the Broncos increased their lead to 24–12, with a 30-yard run by running back Phillip Lindsay late in the third quarter. The Browns responded on their next drive, and with 10:53 remaining in the fourth quarter, Mayfield connected with wide receiver Jarvis Landry on a 9-yard touchdown to narrow the Broncos' lead to 24–19. The drive was aided by a defensive pass interference penalty on cornerback Chris Harris, Jr. on a 3rd-and-7 at the Broncos' 19-yard line. After forcing a Broncos' punt, the Browns reached the Broncos' 28-yard line with 3:23 remaining in the game and no timeouts, facing a 4th-and-4. However, Mayfield's pass intended for Landry was incomplete, and the Broncos' ran out the clock, thanks to a critical third-down conversion by Lindsay on a wildcat formation. With the win, the Broncos entered their bye week with a 3–6 record, and improved to a 24–6 all-time record vs. the Browns (including the playoffs).

==== Week 11: at Minnesota Vikings ====
Week Eleven: Denver Broncos at Minnesota Vikings – Game summary

Quarter	1	2	3	4	Total
Broncos	10	10	3	0	**23**
**Vikings**	0	0	7	20	**27**

at U.S. Bank Stadium, Minneapolis, Minnesota

- Date: November 17
- Game time: 12:00 pm. CST/11:00 am. MST
- Game weather: None (indoor stadium)
- Game attendance: 66,883
- Referee: Clay Martin
- TV announcers (CBS): Kevin Harlan, Rich Gannon and Jay Feely
- Recap, Game Book

Game information

**First quarter**

- DEN – Brandon McManus 47-yard field goal, 11:32. Broncos 3–0. **Drive: 6 plays, 46 yards, 3:28.**
- DEN – Troy Fumagalli 3-yard pass from Brandon Allen (Brandon McManus kick), 4:39. Broncos 10–0. **Drive: 6 plays, 90 yards, 2:23.**

**Second quarter**

- DEN – Andy Janovich 1-yard run (Brandon McManus kick), 12:21. Broncos 17–0. **Drive: 10 plays, 69 yards, 5:06.**
- DEN – Brandon McManus 29-yard field goal, 1:06. Broncos 20–0. **Drive: 4 plays, 6 yards, 1:34.**

**Third quarter**

- MIN – Irv Smith Jr. 10-yard pass from Kirk Cousins (Dan Bailey kick), 11:29. Broncos 20–7. **Drive: 9 plays, 75 yards, 3:31.**
- DEN – Brandon McManus 41-yard field goal, 4:23. Broncos 23–7. **Drive: 12 plays, 52 yards, 7:06.**

**Fourth quarter**

- MIN – Dalvin Cook 3-yard run (pass failed), 13:25. Broncos 23–13. **Drive: 18 plays, 75 yards, 5:58.**
- MIN – Stefon Diggs 54-yard pass from Kirk Cousins (Dan Bailey kick), 10:21. Broncos 23–20. **Drive: 3 plays, 62 yards, 0:35.**
- MIN – Kyle Rudolph 32-yard pass from Kirk Cousins (Dan Bailey kick), 6:01. Vikings 27–23. **Drive: 5 plays, 67 yards, 2:14.**

**Top passers**

- DEN – Brandon Allen – 17/39, 240 yards, TD, INT
- MIN – Kirk Cousins – 29/35, 319 yards, 3 TD

**Top rushers**

- DEN – Phillip Lindsay – 16 rushes, 67 yards
- MIN – Dalvin Cook – 11 rushes, 26 yards, TD

**Top receivers**

- DEN – Courtland Sutton – 5 receptions, 113 yards
- MIN – Stefon Diggs – 5 receptions, 121 yards, TD

The Broncos took a 10–0 lead in the first quarter, with a 47-yard field goal by placekicker Brandon McManus and a 3-yard touchdown pass from quarterback Brandon Allen to tight end Troy Fumagalli. The lead increased to 17–0 early in the second quarter, with a 1-yard touchdown run by fullback Andy Janovich, who later left the game before halftime with a serious elbow injury. Linebacker Shelby Harris forced a strip sack and fumble off Vikings' quarterback Kirk Cousins at the Vikings' 17-yard line; however, the Broncos were forced to settle on a 29-yard field goal by McManus with one minute before halftime. The Broncos recovered a fumble off return specialist Ameer Abdullah on the ensuing kickoff, and were hoping to increase their lead prior to halftime; however, on the next play, Allen was intercepted by safety Andrew Sendejo near the goal line.

The second half was dominated by the Vikings, as they scored a touchdown on all four of their second half possessions. On the opening possession, Cousins connected on a 10-yard touchdown pass to tight end Irv Smith Jr. After a 41-yard field goal by McManus increased the Broncos lead to 23–7, the Vikings pulled to within a 23–20 deficit within the first five minutes of the fourth quarter. First, running back Dalvin Cook rushed for a 3-yard touchdown (with an unsuccessful two-point conversion attempt), and after a forcing a three-and-out by the Broncos' offense, Cousins launched a 54-yard touchdown pass to wide receiver Stefon Diggs. After McManus missed wide right on a 43-yard field goal attempt, the Vikings took their first lead of the game, with Cousins' third touchdown pass—a 32-yarder to tight end Kyle Rudolph with 6:10 remaining in the game. The Broncos began the last possession at their own 40-yard line, and with three fourth-down conversions, methodically marched to the Vikings' 4-yard line with only 10 seconds remaining in the game. However, three consecutive pass attempts into the end zone by Allen fell incomplete, ending the game.

==== Week 12: at Buffalo Bills ====
Week Twelve: Denver Broncos at Buffalo Bills – Game summary

Quarter	1	2	3	4	Total
Broncos	0	0	3	0	**3**
**Bills**	3	3	7	7	**20**

at New Era Field, Orchard Park, New York

- Date: November 24
- Game time: 1:00 pm. EST/11:00 am. MST
- Game weather: Cloudy, 40 °F (4 °C)
- Game attendance: 67,338
- Referee: Jerome Boger
- TV announcers (CBS): Kevin Harlan, Rich Gannon and Jay Feely
- Recap, Game Book

Game information

**First quarter**

- BUF – Steven Hauschka 39-yard field goal, 1:10. Bills 3–0. **Drive: 17 plays, 69 yards, 8:49.**

**Second quarter**

- BUF – Steven Hauschka 23-yard field goal, 8:09. Bills 6–0. **Drive: 12 plays, 87 yards, 5:50.**

**Third quarter**

- BUF – Cole Beasley 18-yard pass from Josh Allen (Steven Hauschka kick), 12:57. Bills 13–0. **Drive: 8 plays, 59 yards, 2:03.**
- DEN – Brandon McManus 45-yard field goal, 7:40. Bills 13–3. **Drive: 10 plays, 48 yards, 5:17.**

**Fourth quarter**

- BUF – John Brown 34-yard pass from Josh Allen (Steven Hauschka kick), 11:08. Bills 20–3. **Drive: 2 plays, 31 yards, 0:46.**

**Top passers**

- DEN – Brandon Allen – 10/25, 82 yards, INT
- BUF – Josh Allen – 15/25, 185 yards, 2 TD, INT

**Top rushers**

- DEN – Phillip Lindsay – 13 rushes, 57 yards
- BUF – Devin Singletary – 21 rushes, 106 yards

**Top receivers**

- DEN – Courtland Sutton – 1 reception, 27 yards
- BUF – Cole Beasley – 6 receptions, 76 yards, TD

The Broncos' offense gained only 134 total yards and the defense surrendered 244 rushing yards, in a 20–3 loss. Following a pair of field goals by Bills' placekicker Steven Hauschka—a 39-yarder in the first quarter and a 23-yarder in the second quarter, Broncos' safety Justin Simmons intercepted a pass off Bills' quarterback Josh Allen. However, the Broncos' failed to capitalize, as quarterback Brandon Allen was intercepted by cornerback Tre'Davious White at the Bills' 8-yard line late in the second quarter. After an 18-yard touchdown pass from Josh Allen to wide receiver Cole Beasley gave the Bills a 13–0 lead on the first possession of the second half, the Broncos' only scoring play was a 45-yard field goal by placekicker Brandon McManus midway through the third quarter. The Broncos' offense did not advance past their own 35-yard line for the remainder of the game, and Josh Allen added another touchdown pass—a 34-yarder to wide receiver John Brown.

==== Week 13: vs. Los Angeles Chargers ====
Week Thirteen: Los Angeles Chargers at Denver Broncos – Game summary

Quarter	1	2	3	4	Total
Chargers	0	10	0	10	**20**
**Broncos**	14	3	0	6	**23**

at Empower Field at Mile High, Denver, Colorado

- Date: December 1
- Game time: 2:25 pm. MST
- Game weather: Mostly sunny, 33 °F (1 °C)
- Game attendance: 74,638
- Referee: Brad Rogers
- TV announcers (CBS): Andrew Catalon, James Lofton and Michael Grady
- Recap, Game Book

Game information

**First quarter**

- DEN – Courtland Sutton 26-yard pass from Drew Lock (Brandon McManus kick), 4:33. Broncos 7–0. **Drive: 12 plays, 80 yards, 5:55.**
- DEN – Courtland Sutton 5-yard pass from Drew Lock (Brandon McManus kick), 0:16. Broncos 14–0. **Drive: 6 plays, 18 yards, 2:56.**

**Second quarter**

- LAC – Michael Badgley 30-yard field goal, 9:27. Broncos 14–3. **Drive: 14 plays, 63 yards, 5:49.**
- DEN – Brandon McManus 31-yard field goal, 5:32. Broncos 17–3. **Drive: 4 plays, 8 yards, 2:07.**
- LAC – Austin Ekeler 30-yard pass from Philip Rivers (Michael Badgley kick), 0:30. Broncos 17–10. **Drive: 3 plays, 77 yards, 0:22.**

**Third quarter**

- No scoring plays.

**Fourth quarter**

- LAC – Keenan Allen 36-yard pass from Philip Rivers (Michael Badgley kick), 12:18. Tied 17–17. **Drive: 5 plays, 62 yards, 2:34.**
- DEN – Brandon McManus 52-yard field goal, 4:26. Broncos 20–17. **Drive: 8 plays, 21 yards, 4:48.**
- LAC – Michael Badgley 46-yard field goal, 0:14. Tied 20–20. **Drive: 8 plays, 46 yards, 4:12.**
- DEN – Brandon McManus 53-yard field goal, 0:00. Broncos 23–20. **Drive: 1 play, 37 yards, 0:14.**

**Top passers**

- LAC – Philip Rivers – 20/29, 265 yards, 2 TD, INT
- DEN – Drew Lock – 18/28, 134 yards, 2 TD, INT

**Top rushers**

- LAC – Melvin Gordon – 20 rushes, 99 yards
- DEN – Phillip Lindsay – 17 rushes, 58 yards

**Top receivers**

- LAC – Mike Williams – 5 receptions, 117 yards
- DEN – Courtland Sutton – 4 receptions, 74 yards, 2 TD

Quarterback Drew Lock, the Broncos' second-round draft selection, made his NFL debut, after missing the first eleven games due to a sprained thumb sustained during the preseason. Lock replaced Brandon Allen, who started the previous three games, and Lock connected on a pair of touchdowns to wide receiver Courtland Sutton in the first quarter—a 26- and a 5-yarder. The latter touchdown occurred after an interception of Chargers' quarterback Philip Rivers. Following an exchange of field goals—a 30-yarder by the Chargers' Michael Badgley and a 31-yarder by the Broncos' Brandon McManus, Rivers threw a 30-yard touchdown pass to running back Austin Ekeler to narrow the Broncos' lead to 17–10 just before halftime. Following a scoreless third quarter, a 36-yard touchdown pass from Rivers to wide receiver Keenan Allen tied the game at 17–17 early in the fourth quarter. On the Broncos' next possession, Lock was intercepted by Chargers' linebacker Denzel Perryman; however, the Chargers gained only one yard and failed to capitalize, as Badgley hit the left upright on a 55-yard field goal attempt. The Broncos re-gained the lead with a 52-yard field goal by McManus at the 4:31 mark of the fourth quarter. However, the Chargers responded, as Badgley redeemed himself with a 46-yard field goal with only 19 seconds remaining in the game. The Broncos had one final possession, and instead of kneeling down for an overtime period, Lock attempted a deep pass to Sutton that was incomplete at the Chargers' 35-yard line with only three seconds remaining. However, Chargers' cornerback Casey Hayward was flagged for pass interference, and after the Chargers called their final timeout, McManus kicked the game-winning 53-yard field goal as time expired.

==== Week 14: at Houston Texans ====
Week Fourteen: Denver Broncos at Houston Texans – Game summary

Quarter	1	2	3	4	Total
**Broncos**	14	17	7	0	**38**
Texans	0	3	7	14	**24**

at NRG Stadium, Houston, Texas

- Date: December 8
- Game time: 12:00 pm. CST/11:00 am. MST
- Game weather: None (retractable roof closed)
- Game attendance: 71,769
- Referee: Adrian Hill
- TV announcers (CBS): Kevin Harlan, Rich Gannon and AJ Ross
- Recap, Game Book

Game information

**First quarter**

- DEN – Noah Fant 14-yard pass from Drew Lock (Brandon McManus kick), 7:27. Broncos 7–0. **Drive: 7 plays, 92 yards, 2:59.**
- DEN – Kareem Jackson 70-yard fumble return (Brandon McManus kick), 3:33. Broncos 14–0.

**Second quarter**

- DEN – Jeff Heuerman 8-yard pass from Drew Lock (Brandon McManus kick), 11:24. Broncos 21–0. **Drive: 8 plays, 80 yards, 4:04.**
- HOU – Kaʻimi Fairbairn 54-yard field goal, 8:49. Broncos 21–3. **Drive: 8 plays, 39 yards, 2:35.**
- DEN – Brandon McManus 36-yard field goal, 3:04. Broncos 24–3. **Drive: 9 plays, 57 yards, 5:45.**
- DEN – Royce Freeman 3-yard pass from Drew Lock (Brandon McManus kick), 0:37. Broncos 31–3. **Drive: 6 plays, 34 yards, 1:19.**

**Third quarter**

- DEN – Philip Lindsay 1-yard run (Brandon McManus kick), 9:15. Broncos 38–3. **Drive: 8 plays, 57 yards, 5:45.**
- HOU – DeAndre Hopkins 43-yard pass from Deshaun Watson (Kaʻimi Fairbairn kick), 7:36. Broncos 38–10. **Drive: 4 plays, 70 yards, 1:39.**

**Fourth quarter**

- HOU – Deshaun Watson 6-yard run (Kaʻimi Fairbairn kick), 13:34. Broncos 38–17. **Drive: 12 plays, 71 yards, 4:03.**
- HOU – Deshaun Watson 3-yard run (Kaʻimi Fairbairn kick), 0:25. Broncos 38–24. **Drive: 14 plays, 79 yards, 3:27.**

**Top passers**

- DEN – Drew Lock – 22/27, 309 yards, 3 TD, INT
- HOU – Deshaun Watson – 28/50, 292 yards, TD, 2 INT

**Top rushers**

- DEN – Phillip Lindsay – 16 rushes, 51 yards, TD
- HOU – Carlos Hyde – 14 rushes, 73 yards

**Top receivers**

- DEN – Noah Fant – 4 receptions, 113 yards, TD
- HOU – DeAndre Hopkins – 7 receptions, 120 yards, TD

Quarterback Drew Lock threw for 309 yards and three touchdown passes, and the defense forced three turnovers, including a 70-yard fumble return for a touchdown by cornerback Kareem Jackson, in a surprising and dominating win over the Texans. The Broncos built a 38–3 lead after a 1-yard touchdown run by running back Phillip Lindsay early in the third quarter, despite surrendering three-second-half touchdowns to Texans' quarterback Deshaun Watson—one passing and two rushing. The Broncos snapped a 21-game streak of failing to reach 30 or more points that dated back to last season, and this was the only game during the 2019 season in which the Broncos scored 30 or more points. In addition, Lock became the first rookie quarterback in NFL history to achieve 300 passing yards and three touchdown passes in his first road start.

==== Week 15: at Kansas City Chiefs ====
Week Fifteen: Denver Broncos at Kansas City Chiefs – Game summary

Quarter	1	2	3	4	Total
Broncos	0	3	0	0	**3**
**Chiefs**	6	9	8	0	**23**

at Arrowhead Stadium, Kansas City, Missouri

- Date: December 15
- Game time: 12:00 pm. CST/11:00 am. MST
- Game weather: Snow, 24 °F (−4 °C)
- Game attendance: 73,257
- Referee: Clete Blakeman
- TV announcers (CBS): Ian Eagle, Dan Fouts and Evan Washburn
- Recap, Game Book

Game information

**First quarter**

- KC – Tyreek Hill 41-yard pass from Patrick Mahomes (pass failed), 9:42. Chiefs 6–0. **Drive: 4 plays, 79 yards, 2:00.**

**Second quarter**

- KC – Harrison Butker 23-yard field goal, 12:57. Chiefs 9–0. **Drive: 12 plays, 79 yards, 6:48.**
- KC – Harrison Butker 24-yard field goal, 6:24. Chiefs 12–0. **Drive: 10 plays, 69 yards, 5:24.**
- DEN – Brandon McManus 32-yard field goal, 1:56. Chiefs 12–3. **Drive: 11 plays, 61 yards, 4:28.**
- KC – Harrison Butker 44-yard field goal, 0:00. Chiefs 15–3. **Drive: 9 plays, 53 yards, 1:56.**

**Third quarter**

- KC – Tyreek Hill 5-yard pass from Patrick Mahomes (Patrick Mahomes–Sammy Watkins pass), 9:45. Chiefs 23–3. **Drive: 10 plays, 75 yards, 5:15.**

**Fourth quarter**

- No scoring plays

**Top passers**

- DEN – Drew Lock – 18/40, 208 yards, INT
- KC – Patrick Mahomes – 27/34, 340 yards, 2 TD, INT

**Top rushers**

- DEN – Phillip Lindsay – 7 rushes, 32 yards
- KC – Darwin Thompson – 8 rushes, 38 yards

**Top receivers**

- DEN – Courtland Sutton – 4 receptions, 79 yards
- KC – Travis Kelce – 11 receptions, 142 yards

The same offensive struggles that had plagued the Broncos all season, prior to their Week 14 win over the Texans, resurfaced in snowy conditions vs. the Chiefs at Arrowhead Stadium. The Broncos' only managed a 32-yard field goal by placekicker Brandon McManus late in the second quarter, after falling behind 12–0. Chiefs' quarterback Patrick Mahomes connected on a pair of touchdown passes to wide receiver Tyreek Hill—a 41-yarder on their opening possession and a 5-yarder in the third quarter that put the game out of reach. With the loss, the Broncos were officially eliminated from postseason contention.

==== Week 16: vs. Detroit Lions ====
Week Sixteen: Detroit Lions at Denver Broncos – Game summary

Quarter	1	2	3	4	Total
Lions	3	7	7	0	**17**
**Broncos**	0	10	3	14	**27**

at Empower Field at Mile High, Denver, Colorado

- Date: December 22
- Game time: 2:05 pm. MST
- Game weather: Mostly cloudy, 67 °F (19 °C)
- Game attendance: 74,115
- Referee: Craig Wrolstad
- TV announcers (CBS): Kevin Harlan, Rich Gannon and Jay Feely
- Recap, Game Book

Game information

**First quarter**

- DET – Matt Prater 26-yard field goal, 8:59. Lions 3–0. **Drive: 11 plays, 68 yards, 6:01.**

**Second quarter**

- DET – Jamal Agnew 64-yard punt return (Matt Prater kick), 10:52. Lions 10–0.
- DEN – Royce Freeman 1-yard run (Brandon McManus kick), 6:04. Lions 10–7. **Drive: 9 plays, 75 yards, 4:48.**
- DEN – Brandon McManus 34-yard field goal, 0:25. Tied 10–10. **Drive: 11 plays, 57 yards, 4:40.**

**Third quarter**

- DEN – Brandon McManus 26-yard field goal, 10:23. Broncos 13–10. **Drive: 11 plays, 45 yards, 4:37.**
- DET – Kenny Golladay 3-yard pass from David Blough (Matt Prater kick), 3:51. Lions 17–13. **Drive: 11 plays, 75 yards, 6:32.**

**Fourth quarter**

- DEN – DaeSean Hamilton 3-yard pass from Drew Lock (Brandon McManus kick), 13:08. Broncos 20–17. **Drive: 11 plays, 75 yards, 5:43.**
- DEN – Phillip Lindsay 27-yard run (Brandon McManus kick), 6:39. Broncos 27–17. **Drive: 7 plays, 61 yards, 4:17.**

**Top passers**

- DET – David Blough – 12/24, 117 yards, TD
- DEN – Drew Lock – 25/33, 192 yards, TD

**Top rushers**

- DET – Kerryon Johnson – 10 rushes, 42 yards
- DEN – Phillip Lindsay – 19 rushes, 109 yards

**Top receivers**

- DET – Kenny Golladay – 6 receptions, 66 yards
- DEN – DaeSean Hamilton – 6 receptions, 65 yards, TD

The Broncos fell behind 10–0 to the Lions, after a 26-yard field goal by placekicker Matt Prater in the first quarter, followed in the second quarter by return specialist Jamal Agnew returning a punt 64 yards for a touchdown. The Broncos responded, with a 1-yard touchdown run by running back Royce Freeman and a 34-yard field goal by placekicker Brandon McManus—the latter just before halftime. After a 26-yard field goal by McManus gave the Broncos a 13–10 lead, the Lions re-claimed the lead later in the third quarter, with quarterback David Blough, starting in place of the injured Matthew Stafford, connecting on a 3-yard touchdown pass to wide receiver Kenny Golladay. However, the Broncos took the lead for good early in the fourth quarter, with quarterback Drew Lock completing a shovel pass to wide receiver DaeSean Hamilton for a 3-yard touchdown. The Broncos later added to their lead, with a 27-yard touchdown run by running back Phillip Lindsay with 6:39 remaining in the game. The Lions' offense did not advance past their own 30-yard line on either of their final two possessions.

==== Week 17: vs. Oakland Raiders ====
Week Seventeen: Oakland Raiders at Denver Broncos – Game summary

Quarter	1	2	3	4	Total
Raiders	0	3	0	12	**15**
**Broncos**	0	10	3	3	**16**

at Empower Field at Mile High, Denver, Colorado

- Date: December 29
- Game time: 2:25 pm. MST
- Game weather: Sunny, 31 °F (−1 °C)
- Game attendance: 76,334
- Referee: Shawn Smith
- TV announcers (CBS): Andrew Catalon and James Lofton
- Recap, Game Book

Game information

**First quarter**

- No scoring plays.

**Second quarter**

- OAK – Daniel Carlson 23-yard field goal, 14:06. Raiders 3–0. **Drive: 8 plays, 88 yards, 4:36.**
- DEN – Brandon McManus 43-yard field goal, 8:21. Tied 3–3. **Drive: 11 plays, 50 yards, 5:45.**
- DEN – Andrew Beck 1-yard pass from Drew Lock (Brandon McManus kick), 0:28. Broncos 10–3. **Drive: 5 plays, 41 yards, 0:43.**

**Third quarter**

- DEN – Brandon McManus 49-yard field goal, 4:37. Broncos 13–3. **Drive: 11 plays, 58 yards, 4:34.**

**Fourth quarter**

- DEN – Brandon McManus 51-yard field goal, 14:55. Broncos 16–3. **Drive: 6 plays, 27 yards, 3:01.**
- OAK – Daniel Carlson 33-yard field goal, 9:03. Broncos 16–6. **Drive: 12 plays, 60 yards, 5:52.**
- OAK – Daniel Carlson 28-yard field goal, 3:09. Broncos 16–9. **Drive: 3 plays, 5 yards, 0:24.**
- OAK – Hunter Renfrow 3-yard pass from Derek Carr (pass failed), 0:07. Broncos 16–15. **Drive: 8 plays, 53 yards, 1:34.**

**Top passers**

- OAK – Derek Carr – 29/46, 391 yards, TD
- DEN – Drew Lock – 17/28, 177 yards, TD

**Top rushers**

- OAK – DeAndre Washington – 17 rushes, 77 yards
- DEN – Phillip Lindsay – 18 rushes, 53 yards

**Top receivers**

- OAK – Darren Waller – 6 receptions, 107 yards
- DEN – DaeSean Hamilton – 5 receptions, 65 yards

In the Broncos' season finale, they faced the Oakland Raiders for the final time—home or away—prior to the Raiders' relocation to Las Vegas for 2020. The Raiders got on the scoreboard early in the second quarter, with a 23-yard field goal by placekicker Daniel Carlson, who missed wide left on a 39-yard attempt midway through the first quarter. The Broncos responded, with a 43-yard field goal by placekicker Brandon McManus. The Raiders faced a 3rd-and-goal at the Broncos' 5-yard line on their next possession, and a 5-yard pass from quarterback Derek Carr to wide receiver Hunter Renfrow was initially ruled a touchdown. However, after a booth review, Renfrow was ruled down at the 1-yard line. On the very next play, fullback Alec Ingold was stopped inches short of the goal line on fourth down by the Broncos' defense. The Raiders thought Ingold had broken the plane of the goal line, and unsuccessfully challenged the ruling of the play, resulting in a turnover on downs. After a fumble on the Raiders' next possession, the Broncos took advantage, with a 1-yard touchdown pass from quarterback Drew Lock to tight end Andrew Beck just before halftime.

The Broncos increased their lead to 16–3, with a pair of field goals by McManus—a 49-yarder in the third quarter, followed by a 51-yarder on the first play of the fourth quarter. The Raiders responded with a pair of field goals by Carlson—from 33 and 28 yards out; the latter occurring after a fumble by Lock. After a Raiders' turnover on downs at their own 27-yard line, the Broncos attempted to either the run out the clock or add to their lead. However, after a false start and an unnecessary roughness penalty on offensive tackle Garett Bolles pushes the Broncos back 15 yards, McManus missed wide-right on a 57-yard field goal attempt, giving the Raiders one last possession at their own 47-yard line. On the eighth play of the drive, the Raiders finally reached the end zone, with a 3-yard pass from Carr to Renfrow to pull to within a 16–15 deficit with 11 seconds remaining in the game. Instead on sending the game to overtime, the Raiders decided to go for a potential game-winning two-point conversion attempt. However, Carr's pass attempt was batted down by nose tackle Shelby Harris, and the Raiders' ensuing onside kick attempt was unsuccessful, giving the Broncos the win.

=== Quarterback carousel ===
For the second time in three seasons, the Broncos underwent multiple changes at the quarterback position. The team traded for former Baltimore Ravens' quarterback Joe Flacco during the offseason. However, he threw for 1,822 yards and only six touchdown passes, prior to discovery of a herniated disc in his neck that ended his season following the team's Week 8 loss to the Indianapolis Colts. Backup quarterback Brandon Allen took over, beginning with their Week 9 win over the Cleveland Browns, and in three starts, threw for 515 yards and three touchdown passes. Following a poor performance during the Broncos' Week 12 loss to the Buffalo Bills, Allen was replaced by Drew Lock, the team's second-round draft selection. Lock missed the first eleven games due to a sprained thumb that he sustained during the preseason, and he made his NFL debut on December 1, leading the Broncos to a 4–1 record in their last five games. Lock became the Broncos' seventh different starting quarterback since Week 9 of the 2017 season.

=== Standings ===
==== Division ====
AFC West
	W	L	T	PCT	DIV	CONF	PF	PA	STK
^{(2)} Kansas City Chiefs	12	4	0	.750	6–0	9–3	451	308	W6
Denver Broncos	7	9	0	.438	3–3	6–6	282	316	W2
Oakland Raiders	7	9	0	.438	3–3	5–7	313	419	L1
Los Angeles Chargers	5	11	0	.313	0–6	3–9	337	345	L3

==== Conference ====
AFC
#	Team	Division	W	L	T	PCT	DIV	CONF	SOS	SOV	STK
**Division leaders**
1	Baltimore Ravens	North	14	2	0	.875	5–1	10–2	.494	.484	W12
2 (Note: Kansas City claimed the No. 2 seed over New England based on head-to-head victory.)	Kansas City Chiefs	West	12	4	0	.750	6–0	9–3	.510	.477	W6
3	New England Patriots	East	12	4	0	.750	5–1	8–4	.469	.411	L1
4	Houston Texans	South	10	6	0	.625	4–2	8–4	.520	.488	L1
**Wild Cards**
5	Buffalo Bills	East	10	6	0	.625	3–3	7–5	.461	.363	L2
6	Tennessee Titans	South	9	7	0	.563	3–3	7–5	.488	.465	W1
**Did not qualify for the postseason**
7	Pittsburgh Steelers	North	8	8	0	.500	3–3	6–6	.502	.324	L3
8 (Note: Denver finished ahead of Indianapolis and NY Jets based on conference record. Division tiebreak was initially used to eliminate Oakland (see below).) (Note: Denver finished ahead of Oakland based on conference record.)	Denver Broncos	West	7	9	0	.438	3–3	6–6	.510	.406	W2
9 (Note: Oakland and Indianapolis finished ahead of NY Jets based on conference record.) (Note: Oakland finished ahead of Indianapolis based on head-to-head victory.)	Oakland Raiders	West	7	9	0	.438	3–3	5–7	.482	.335	L1
10	Indianapolis Colts	South	7	9	0	.438	3–3	5–7	.492	.500	L1
11	New York Jets	East	7	9	0	.438	2–4	4–8	.473	.402	W2
12 (Note: Jacksonville finished ahead of Cleveland based on record against common opponents. Jacksonville's cumulative record against Cincinnati, Denver, NY Jets, and Tennessee was 4–1, compared to Cleveland's 2–3 cumulative record against the same four teams.)	Jacksonville Jaguars	South	6	10	0	.375	2–4	6–6	.484	.406	W1
13	Cleveland Browns	North	6	10	0	.375	3–3	6–6	.533	.479	L3
14 (Note: LA Chargers finished ahead of Miami based on head-to-head victory.)	Los Angeles Chargers	West	5	11	0	.313	0–6	3–9	.514	.488	L3
15	Miami Dolphins	East	5	11	0	.313	2–4	4–8	.484	.463	W2
16	Cincinnati Bengals	North	2	14	0	.125	1–5	2–10	.553	.406	W1
**Tiebreakers** (Note: When breaking ties for three or more teams under the NFL's rules, they are first broken within divisions, then comparing only the highest ranked remaining team from each division.)

=== Statistics ===
==== Team leaders ====
Category	Player(s)	Value
Passing yards	Joe Flacco	1,822
Passing touchdowns	Drew Lock	7
Rushing yards	Phillip Lindsay	1,011
Rushing touchdowns	Phillip Lindsay	7
Receptions	Courtland Sutton	72
Receiving yards	Courtland Sutton	1,112
Receiving touchdowns	Courtland Sutton	6
Points	Brandon McManus	112
Kickoff return yards	Diontae Spencer	436
Punt return yards	Diontae Spencer	208
Tackles	Todd Davis	136
Sacks	Von Miller	8.0
Forced fumbles	A. J. Johnson	2
Interceptions	Justin Simmons	4

Source for this section: Denver Broncos' official website.

==== League rankings ====
Offense
Category	Value	NFL rank (out of 32)
Total yards	298.6 YPG	28th
Yards per play	5.0	26th
Rushing yards	103.9 YPG	20th
Yards per rush	4.1	21st
Passing yards	194.7 YPG	28th
Yards per pass	6.7	T–21st
Total touchdowns	28	T–30th
Rushing touchdowns	11	T–22nd
Receiving touchdowns	16	32nd
Scoring	17.6 PPG	28th
Pass completions	312/504 (.619)	20th
Third downs	64/202 (.317)	30th
First downs per game	17.4	29th
Possession average	29:21	21st
Fewest sacks allowed	41	T–16th
Turnover differential	+1	T–13th
Fewest penalties	110	19th
Least penalty yardage	912	18th

Defense
Category	Value	NFL rank (out of 32)
Total yards	337.0 YPG	12th
Yards per play	5.4	T–13th
Rushing yards	111.4 YPG	16th
Yards per rush	4.2	T–13th
Passing yards	225.6 YPG	11th
Yards per pass	7.1	14th
Total touchdowns	31	T–4th
Rushing touchdowns	9	T–5th
Receiving touchdowns	19	T–5th
Scoring	19.8 PPG	10th
Pass completions	348/537 (.648)	24th
Third downs	79/211 (.374)	13th
First downs per game	19.1	T–9th
Sacks	40.0	T–17th
Forced fumbles	9	T–26th
Fumble recoveries	6	T–26th
Interceptions	10	T–25th
Fewest penalties	121	29th
Least penalty yardage	1,041	T–28th

Special teams
Category	Value	NFL rank (out of 32)
Kickoff returns	25.4 YPR	3rd
Punt returns	7.7 YPR	T–12th
Gross punting	44.4 YPP	T–24th
Net punting	39.4 YPP	T–26th
Kickoff coverage	26.8 YPR	29th
Punt coverage	9.8 YPR	30th

Source for this section: NFL.com.

== Awards and honors ==
Recipient	Award(s)
Kareem Jackson	Week 14: AFC Defensive Player of the Week
A. J. Johnson	October: Pro Football Focus' AFC Defensive Player of the Month
Dre'Mont Jones	Week 16: AFC Defensive Player of the Week
Drew Lock	Week 14: NFL Rookie of the Week

=== Pro Bowl and All-Pro selections ===
Linebacker Von Miller was selected to the 2020 Pro Bowl, while wide receiver Courtland Sutton, safety Kareem Jackson and return specialist Diontae Spencer were named alternates. Sutton was later added to the Pro Bowl roster as an injury replacement for Houston Texans' wide receiver DeAndre Hopkins, becoming the fastest wide receiver in Broncos' franchise history to make his first Pro Bowl—in his second season. Safety Justin Simmons was voted to the 2019 All-Pro Team and named to the Second Team.

== Other news and notes ==
On September 4, Broncos Stadium at Mile High was rebranded as Empower Field at Mile High. The Broncos had been seeking a long-term naming rights partner for their home field since sporting goods retailer Sports Authority went bankrupt in 2016. Empower Retirement, a retirement plan provider that is based in Denver, had served as a team sponsor since 2015, with the Broncos agreeing to terms on a 21-year deal that will run through 2039, though financial terms were undisclosed. This marks the third naming rights change for the Broncos' home field, following "Invesco Field at Mile High" (2001–2010), "Sports Authority Field at Mile High" (2011–2017) and "Broncos Stadium at Mile High"—the latter of which was used on a temporary basis for the 2018 season.
