= Josh Watson =

Josh Watson may refer to:

- Josh Watson (swimmer)
- Josh Watson (American football)

== See also ==
- Joshua Watson, English wine merchant and philanthropist
