= Corey Levin =

American football player (born 1994)

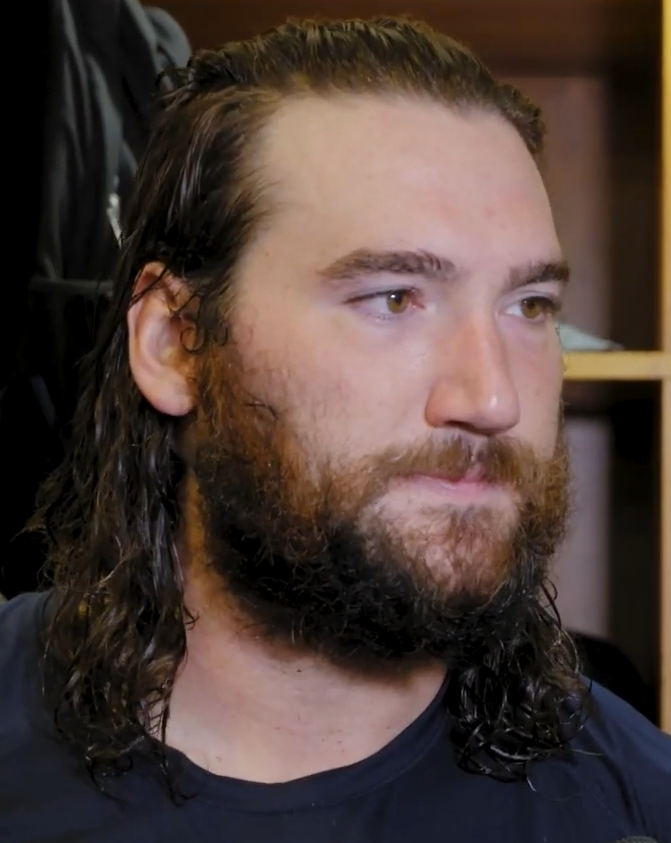
- Levin with the Tennessee Titans in 2022

No. 62 – Atlanta Falcons
- Position: Center
- Roster status: Active

Personal information
- Born: August 12, 1994 (age 32); Dacula, Georgia, U.S.
- Listed height: 6 ft 4 in (1.93 m)
- Listed weight: 307 lb (139 kg)

Career information
- High school: Dacula
- College: Chattanooga (2012–2016)
- NFL draft: 2017: 6th round, 217th overall pick

Career history
- Tennessee Titans (2017–2018); Denver Broncos (2019); Chicago Bears (2019); New England Patriots (2020)*; New York Jets (2021)*; Tennessee Titans (2021–2025); Atlanta Falcons (2026–present}
- * Offseason or practice squad member only

Career NFL statistics as of Week 5, 2026
- Games played: 93
- Games started: 7
- Stats at Pro Football Reference

Corey Michael Levin (born August 12, 1994) is an American professional football center for the Atlanta Falcons of the National Football League (NFL). He played college football for the Chattanooga Mocs and was selected by the Tennessee Titans in the sixth round of the 2017 NFL draft. Levin has also been a member of the Denver Broncos, Chicago Bears, New England Patriots, and New York Jets.

== Professional career ==
Pre-draft measurables
Height	Weight	Arm length	Hand span	Wingspan	40-yard dash	10-yard split	20-yard split	20-yard shuttle	Three-cone drill	Vertical jump	Broad jump	Bench press
6 ft 3 7/8 in (1.93 m)	307 lb (139 kg)	33 1/2 in (0.85 m)	10 7/8 in (0.28 m)	6 ft 6 1/8 in (1.98 m)	5.16 s	1.79 s	2.98 s	4.73 s	7.55 s	26.5 in (0.67 m)	8 ft 10 in (2.69 m)	26 reps
All values from NFL Combine

=== Tennessee Titans (first stint) ===
The Tennessee Titans selected Levin in the sixth round (217th overall) of the 2017 NFL draft. On May 12, 2017, the Titans signed Levin to a four-year, $2.51 million contract with a signing bonus of $110,014.

On August 31, 2019, Levin was waived by the Titans.

=== Denver Broncos ===
On September 1, 2019, Levin was claimed off waivers by the Denver Broncos. He was waived on September 14 in favor of Jake Rodgers, and re-signed to the practice squad.

=== Chicago Bears ===
On November 30, 2019, Levin was signed by the Chicago Bears off the Broncos' practice squad.

On September 3, 2020, Levin was waived by the Bears as part of final roster cuts.

=== New England Patriots ===
On September 9, 2020, Levin was signed to the New England Patriots' practice squad, but was released two days later.

=== New York Jets ===
On April 8, 2021, Levin was signed by the New York Jets. On August 31, he was waived by the Jets as part of final roster cuts.

=== Tennessee Titans (second stint) ===
On September 1, 2021, the Titans claimed Levin off waivers, reuniting him with the team that selected him in 2017. Five days later, he was released by the Titans and re-signed to the practice squad the following day. Levin was promoted to the active roster on October 8. During the 2021 season, he played in 12 games at both guard and center.

Levin appeared in all 17 games during the 2022 season, making three starts at center.

Levin re-signed with the Titans on March 31, 2023. He appeared in 16 games during the 2023 season, primarily as a special teams contributor.

Levin re-signed with the team on July 25, 2024. On August 27, he was released by the Titans as part of final roster cuts and re-signed to the practice squad the following day. Levin was promoted to the active roster on November 16. He appeared in 10 games during the 2024 season as a rotational center, making one start.

On March 14, 2025, Levin re-signed with the Titans on a one-year contract. On August 27, he was released, but was re-signed to the practice squad the following day. Levin was promoted to the active roster on September 13.

=== Atlanta Falcons ===
On March 14, 2026, Levin signed with the Atlanta Falcons on a one-year contract.
