= Rich Scangarello =

American football coach (born 1972)

Personal information
- Born: April 15, 1972 (age 54); Los Angeles County, California, U.S.

Career information
- High school: Roseville (CA) Oakmont
- College: Sacramento State

Career history
- UC Davis (1998–1999) Graduate assistant; Idaho (2000) Graduate assistant; Carleton (2001) Offensive coordinator; Idaho (2002–2003) Quarterbacks coach; UC Davis (2004–2007) Wide receivers coach; UC Davis (2008) Co-offensive coordinator & wide receivers coach; Oakland Raiders (2009) Offensive quality control coach; Millsaps (2010–2011) Assistant head coach & offensive coordinator & quarterbacks coach; Northern Arizona (2012–2014) Offensive coordinator & quarterbacks coach; Atlanta Falcons (2015) Offensive quality control coach; Wagner (2016) Offensive coordinator & quarterbacks coach; San Francisco 49ers (2017–2018) Quarterbacks coach; Denver Broncos (2019) Offensive coordinator; Philadelphia Eagles (2020) Senior offensive assistant; San Francisco 49ers (2021) Quarterbacks coach; Kentucky (2022) Offensive coordinator & quarterbacks coach; Las Vegas Raiders (2024) Quarterbacks coach
- Coaching profile at Pro Football Reference

Rich Scangarello (born April 15, 1972) is an American football coach. He currently works for the sports agency LIFT Sports Management, mentoring quarterbacks throughout their college football careers, and providing training and private coaching as they prepare for professional football careers.

Prior to his current position, Scangarello coached football at the professional and college levels, most recently as the quarterbacks coach for the Las Vegas Raiders of the National Football League (NFL). He was previously a quarterbacks coach for the San Francisco 49ers. He has also been the offensive coordinator for the Denver Broncos and the University of Kentucky, as well as an assistant coach for the Oakland Raiders, Atlanta Falcons and Philadelphia Eagles, as well as several other college football programs.

== Coaching career ==
=== Early coaching career ===
From 1998 to 1999, Scangarello served as a graduate assistant at UC Davis. He also served as a graduate assistant at Idaho in 2000. In 2001, Scangarello served as offensive coordinator at Carleton. From 2002 to 2003, Scangarello returned to UC Davis as their quarterbacks coach. In 2004, he returned to UC Davis as wide receivers coach. Scangarello was promoted to co-offensive coordinator in 2008

=== Oakland Raiders ===
In 2009, Scangarello was hired by the Oakland Raiders as an offensive quality control coach. He replaced Mark Costagliola.

=== Millsaps ===
In 2010, Scangarello was hired by Millsaps as their assistant head coach, offensive coordinator, and quarterbacks coach.

=== Northern Arizona ===
In 2012, Scangarello was hired by Northern Arizona as their offensive coordinator and quarterbacks coach.

=== Atlanta Falcons ===
In 2015, Scangarello was hired by the Atlanta Falcons as an offensive quality control coach.

=== Wagner ===
In 2016, Scangarello was hired by Wagner as their offensive coordinator.

=== San Francisco 49ers (first stint) ===
In 2017, Scangarello was hired by the San Francisco 49ers as their quarterbacks coach.

=== Denver Broncos ===
On January 16, 2019, Scangarello was hired by the Denver Broncos as their offensive coordinator. On January 12, 2020, Scangarello was fired by head coach Vic Fangio after Denver finished last in several offensive categories.

=== Philadelphia Eagles ===
On February 5, 2020, Scangarello was hired by the Philadelphia Eagles as a senior offensive assistant.

=== San Francisco 49ers (second stint) ===
Scangarello was named the quarterbacks coach for the San Francisco 49ers in 2021.

=== Kentucky ===
On February 25, 2022, it was reported that Scangarello would be hired as offensive coordinator at the University of Kentucky. He was fired on November 29, 2022.

=== Las Vegas Raiders ===
On February 23, 2024, Scangarello was hired by the Las Vegas Raiders as their quarterbacks coach under head coach Antonio Pierce. He was fired on November 3 along with offensive coordinator Luke Getsy and another assistant, after the Raiders lost their Week 9 game against the Cincinnati Bengals.

== LIFT Sports Management ==
On July 31, 2025, it was reported that Scangarello had joined the sports agency LIFT Sports Management as a private quarterback coach, mentoring and training quarterbacks throughout their college careers and as they prepare to enter the NFL Draft.
