= Shakial Taylor =

American football player (born 1996)

No. 47
- Position: Cornerback

Personal information
- Born: December 27, 1996 (age 29); Lakeland, Florida, U.S.
- Listed height: 6 ft 0 in (1.83 m)
- Listed weight: 181 lb (82 kg)

Career information
- High school: Stephenson (Lithonia, Georgia) Chaparral (Scottsdale, Arizona)
- College: South Dakota MCC Kansas
- NFL draft: 2019: undrafted

Career history
- Indianapolis Colts (2019); Denver Broncos (2019); New York Giants (2020); Philadelphia Eagles (2021)*
- * Offseason or practice squad member only

Career NFL statistics
- Total tackles: 15
- Pass deflections: 5
- Stats at Pro Football Reference

Shakial Taylor (born December 27, 1996) is an American former professional football player who was a cornerback in the National Football League (NFL). He played college football for the Kansas Jayhawks.

== College career ==
Taylor began his collegiate career at South Dakota State, playing for one year before transferring to Mesa Community College. In his only year at Mesa, Taylor broke up 18 passes with an interception and 42 total tackles. He transferred to the University of Kansas for his final two seasons of eligibility over offers from Arizona State, Memphis, UNLV, New Mexico, and Middle Tennessee State. In his first season with the Jayhawks, Taylor started the first nine games of the season before suffering season-ending injury and made 22 tackles with six pass-breakups. As a senior, Taylor recorded 47 tackles, three interceptions (one returned for a touchdown), seven passes defensed and two forced fumbles.

== Professional career ==
=== Indianapolis Colts ===
Taylor signed with the Indianapolis Colts as an undrafted free agent on May 7, 2019. Despite having a great preseason & training camp, he was waived due to a concussion-related injury during the final cuts of training camp. Taylor took an injury settlement and couldn't sign back with the Colts until Week 5. He was re-signed in Week 5 to the team's practice squad, replacing Jalen Collins. Taylor was promoted to the active roster on October 5. He made his NFL debut on October 6 against the Kansas City Chiefs, making one tackle and breaking up a pass. He was waived on November 25, while Picasso Nelson Jr. was signed to the practice squad.

=== Denver Broncos ===
On November 26, 2019, Taylor was claimed off waivers by the Denver Broncos.

Taylor signed a one-year exclusive-rights free agent tender with the Broncos on April 18, 2020. He was waived by Denver on July 27.

=== New York Giants ===
On July 28, 2020, Taylor was claimed off waivers by the New York Giants and the team waived him five days later. He chose to opt-out of the 2020 NFL season due to the COVID-19 pandemic, and was reinstated to the Giants' roster on their opt-out reserve list on August 25. Taylor was waived after the season on February 12, 2021.

=== Philadelphia Eagles ===
On February 16, 2021, Taylor was claimed off waivers by the Philadelphia Eagles. He was waived by Philadelphia on August 5.

== Personal life ==
Taylor is the nephew of NFL cornerback Robert Nelson.
