= A. J. Johnson (linebacker) =

American football player (born 1991)

Alexander Johnson
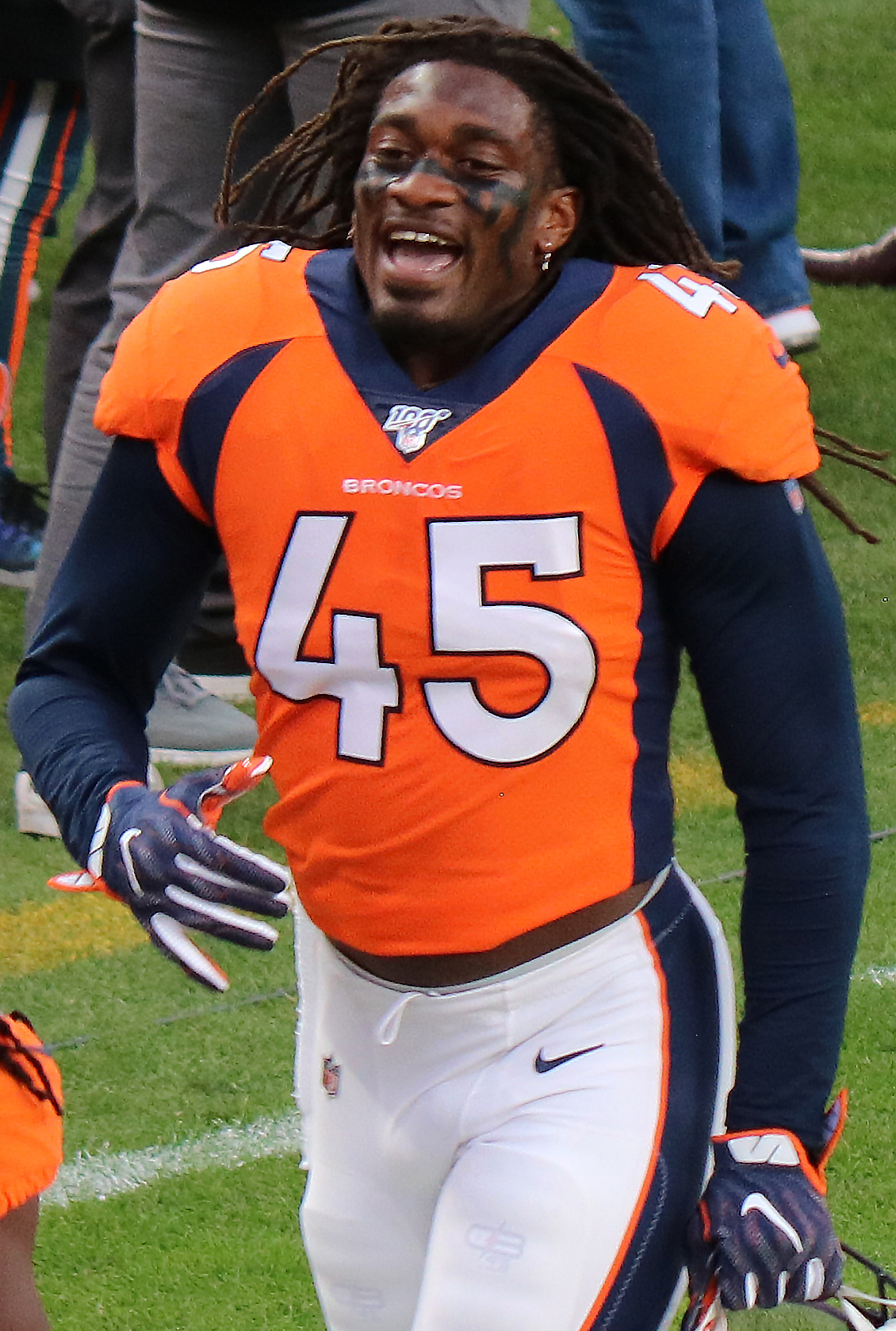
- Johnson with the Denver Broncos in 2019

Profile
- Position: Linebacker

Personal information
- Born: December 24, 1991 (age 34); Gainesville, Georgia, U.S.
- Listed height: 6 ft 2 in (1.88 m)
- Listed weight: 255 lb (116 kg)

Career information
- High school: Gainesville
- College: Tennessee
- NFL draft: 2015: undrafted

Career history
- Denver Broncos (2018–2021); Seattle Seahawks (2022); Miami Dolphins (2023)*
- * Offseason or practice squad member only

Awards and highlights
- First-team All-SEC (2013); Second-team All-SEC (2012)

Career NFL statistics
- Total tackles: 252
- Sacks: 4.5
- Forced fumbles: 4
- Fumble recoveries: 2
- Pass deflections: 8
- Interceptions: 1
- Stats at Pro Football Reference

Alexander James Johnson (born December 24, 1991) is an American professional football linebacker. He played college football for the Tennessee Volunteers.

== Early life ==
Johnson attended and played high school football at Gainesville High School,

== College career ==
Johnson attended the University of Tennessee, where he played college football under head coaches Derek Dooley and Butch Jones. Johnson made 138 tackles in 2012 to lead the Southeastern Conference (SEC) in that category. He made 106 tackles in 2013, and was named First-team All-SEC.

He was also named a Freshman All-American by the Football Writers Association of America in 2011.

Following speculation that he might skip his final year of eligibility to enter the NFL draft, Johnson announced in January 2014 that he would remain at Tennessee for his senior year. In April 2014, Johnson was named a Strength and Conditioning All-American by the National Strength and Conditioning Association.

=== Suspension ===
On November 18, 2014, Johnson was suspended from the University of Tennessee after he was accused of rape. Two days prior, Johnson threw a party at his apartment. A woman, who was visiting out of state, stated she had previously had two sexual encounters with Johnson. She alleged that she was shocked when Johnson immediately began having sex with her after entering his bedroom. She then alleges that Johnson's teammate Michael Williams joined and began raping her alongside Johnson. On February 12, 2015, Johnson and Williams were both officially indicted on two counts of aggravated rape by a grand jury.

On July 27, 2018, Johnson and Williams were acquitted of all charges.

== Professional career ==
=== Pre-draft ===
Pre-draft measurables
Height	Weight
6 ft 2 in (1.88 m)	242 lb (110 kg)
Values from Pro Day

Johnson initially received an invitation to attend the 2015 NFL Scouting Combine. On February 13, 2015, it was reported that the NFL had officially rescinded Johnson's invitation to the NFL Combine after he was indicted on two counts of aggravated rape the day prior. Johnson was projected to be a third or fourth-round pick by the majority of NFL draft experts before he was accused of rape.

=== Denver Broncos ===
==== 2018 ====
Johnson signed with the Denver Broncos as an undrafted free agent on August 13, 2018, after being acquitted of his rape charges. He made the Broncos 53-man roster, only playing in one game through 11 weeks before being waived on November 29, 2018. After clearing waivers, he was re-signed to the Broncos practice squad. He signed a reserve/future contract with the Broncos on January 2, 2019.

==== 2019 ====
In Week 5, against the Los Angeles Chargers, Johnson made his first career start. He intercepted a pass from Philip Rivers in the end zone as the Broncos won 20–13. In Week 6, against the Tennessee Titans, he made 9 total tackles with 1.5 sacks and 1 tackle for loss as the Broncos won 16–0. In Week 9 against the Cleveland Browns, Johnson recorded a team-high 13 tackles in the 24–19 win.

Johnson recorded five total tackles in a Week 14 road contest against the Houston Texans and former Gainesville High teammate Deshaun Watson. The linebacker also forced a Keke Coutee fumble that teammate Kareem Jackson returned for a 70-yard touchdown en route to a 38–24 Broncos victory. He finished the 2019 season with 1.5 sacks, 93 total tackles (51 solo), one interception, three passes defended, two forced fumbles, and one fumble recovery in 15 games and starts.

==== 2020 ====
Johnson started in all 16 games in the 2020 season. He finished with one sack, 124 total tackles (72 solo), two passes defended, and two forced fumbles.

==== 2021 ====
The Broncos placed a second-round restricted free agent tender on Johnson on March 16, 2021. He signed the one-year contract on May 20. He entered the 2021 season as a starting linebacker. He suffered a torn pectoral in Week 6 and was placed on season-ending injured reserve on October 19, 2021.

=== Seattle Seahawks ===
On October 26, 2022, Johnson was signed to the Seattle Seahawks practice squad.

=== Miami Dolphins ===
On August 24, 2023, Johnson signed with the Miami Dolphins. He was waived on August 28, and re-signed to the practice squad. He was not signed to a reserve/future contract after the season and thus became a free agent upon the expiration of his practice squad contract.
