= Kelvin McKnight =

American football player (born 1997)

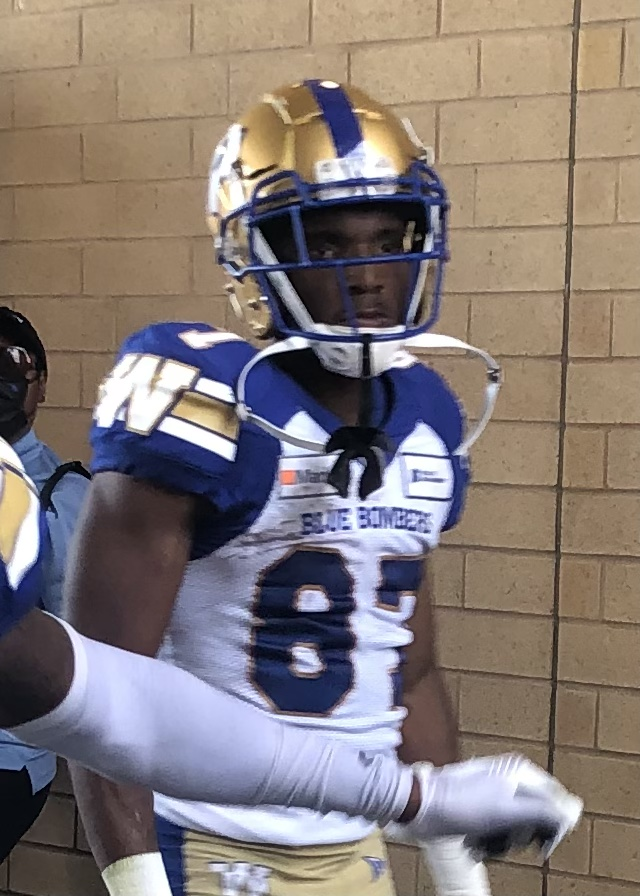
- McKnight with the Winnipeg Blue Bombers in 2021

No. 9 – Osos de Monterrey
- Position: Wide receiver
- Roster status: Active

Personal information
- Born: April 25, 1997 (age 29); Bradenton, Florida, U.S.
- Listed height: 5 ft 9 in (1.75 m)
- Listed weight: 189 lb (86 kg)

Career information
- High school: Bradenton (FL) Manatee
- College: Samford
- NFL draft: 2019: undrafted

Career history
- Denver Broncos (2019)*; New England Patriots (2019)*; Denver Broncos (2019–2020)*; Winnipeg Blue Bombers (2021–2022); Seattle Sea Dragons (2023); Rhein Fire (2024); Osos de Monterrey (2025–present)
- * Offseason or practice squad member only

Awards and highlights
- ELF champion (2024); XFL punt return yards leader (2023); 2× FCS All-American (2017, 2018); 2× First-team All-SoCon (2017, 2018); Second-team All-SoCon (2016); SoCon Freshman of the Year (2015)

Career CFL statistics
- Receptions: 19
- Receiving yards: 93
- Return yards: 11
- Stats at CFL.ca
- Stats at Pro Football Reference

Kelvin McKnight Jr. (born April 25, 1997) is an American gridiron football wide receiver for the Osos de Monterrey of the Liga de Fútbol Americano Profesional (LFA). He played college football at Samford. He played for the Denver Broncos and New England Patriots of the National Football League (NFL), the Winnipeg Blue Bombers of the Canadian Football League (CFL), and the Rhein Fire of the European League of Football (ELF).

== Professional career ==
=== Denver Broncos ===
McKnight was signed to the Denver Broncos practice squad on October 23, 2019. He was waived by the Broncos on July 27, 2020.

=== Winnipeg Blue Bombers ===
McKnight signed a one-year deal with the Winnipeg Blue Bombers on June 15, 2021. In his first season with the Bombers he played in eight games catching five passes for 96 yards. McKnight was released by the Bombers on June 16, 2022. About one month later he was re-signed by the Bombers on July 26, 2022, midway through the 2022 season. He was released from the practice roster on October 4, 2022.

=== Seattle Sea Dragons ===
McKnight was assigned to the Seattle Sea Dragons of the XFL on January 6, 2023. The Sea Dragons folded when the XFL and USFL merged to create the United Football League (UFL).

=== Rhein Fire ===
On March 15, 2024, McKnight signed with the Rhein Fire of the European League of Football (ELF).
