= Deyon Sizer =

American football player (born 1996)

No. 91, 78, 95
- Position: Defensive end

Personal information
- Born: August 16, 1996 (age 30); Aurora, Colorado, U.S.
- Listed height: 6 ft 4 in (1.93 m)
- Listed weight: 280 lb (127 kg)

Career information
- High school: Eaglecrest (Centennial, Colorado)
- College: CSU Pueblo
- NFL draft: 2019: undrafted

Career history
- Denver Broncos (2019–2021); New Jersey Generals (2022–2023); Ottawa Redblacks (2024)*
- * Offseason or practice squad member only
- Stats at Pro Football Reference

Deyon Sizer (born August 16, 1996) is an American former professional football defensive end. He played college football at CSU Pueblo.

== Professional career ==
=== Denver Broncos ===
Sizer signed with the Denver Broncos as an undrafted free agent on May 13, 2019. He was waived on July 26, 2019, but was re-signed on August 4. He was waived on August 31, 2019, and re-signed to the practice squad. He was promoted to the active roster on December 14, 2019.

On April 27, 2020, Sizer was waived by the Broncos. He was re-signed to their practice squad on September 24, 2020. He signed a reserve/future contract on January 4, 2021.

On August 17, 2021, Sizer was waived by the Broncos. He was re-signed to the practice squad on December 28. He was released on January 3, 2022.

=== New Jersey Generals ===
Sizer signed with the New Jersey Generals of the United States Football League on April 1, 2022. He was transferred to the team's inactive roster on April 30 due to a chest injury. He was moved back to the active roster on May 6.

Sizer was placed on the injured reserve list by the team on May 4, 2023. He was transferred to the inactive list on June 8. Sizer became a free agent after the 2023 season.

=== Ottawa Redblacks ===
On January 22, 2024, Sizer signed with the Ottawa Redblacks of the Canadian Football League (CFL). He was released on May 11, 2024.
