= Josh Watson (American football) =

American football player (born 1996)

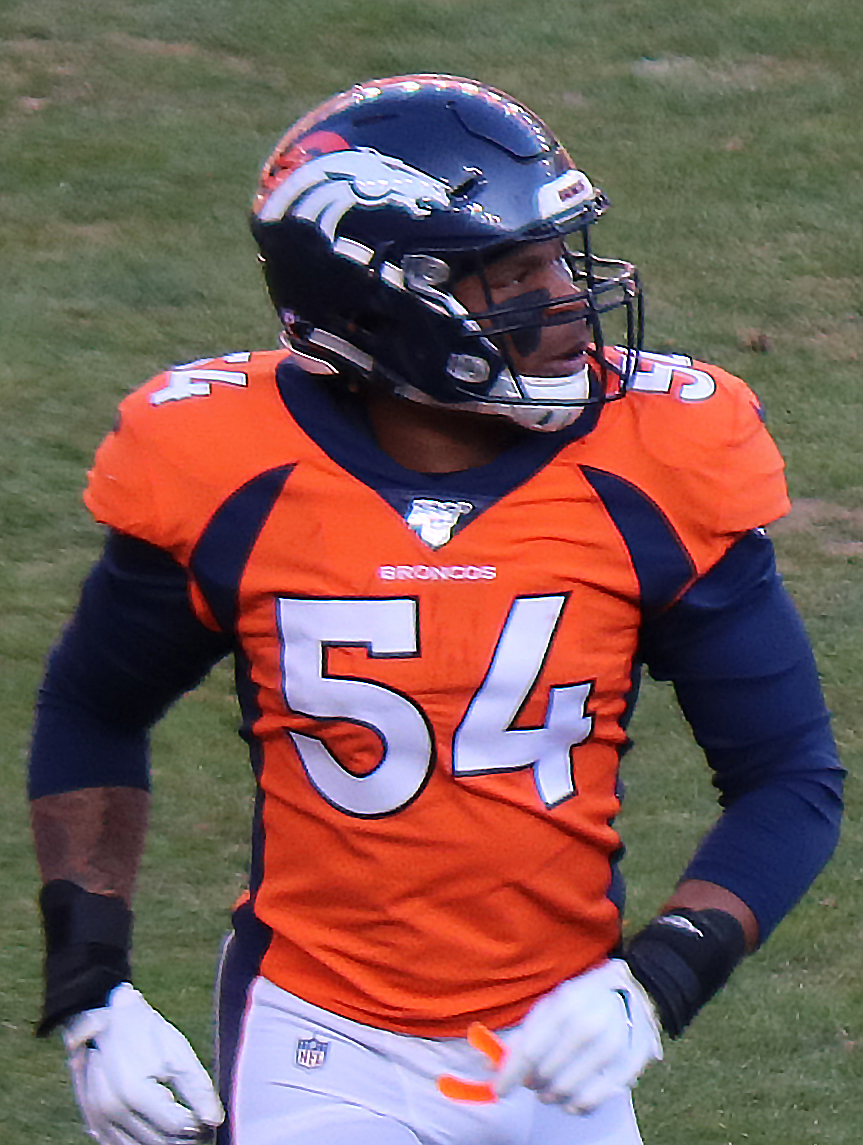
- Watson with the Denver Broncos in 2019

Profile
- Position: Linebacker

Personal information
- Born: May 20, 1996 (age 30); Kansas City, Missouri, U.S.
- Listed height: 6 ft 2 in (1.88 m)
- Listed weight: 240 lb (109 kg)

Career information
- College: Colorado State
- NFL draft: 2019: undrafted

Career history
- Denver Broncos (2019–2020); Los Angeles Chargers (2021)*; Carolina Panthers (2021)*; Houston Texans (2021); Carolina Panthers (2022)*; Arlington Renegades (2023)*
- * Offseason or practice squad member only

Awards and highlights
- Second-team All-Mountain West (2018)

Career NFL statistics
- Total tackles: 7
- Stats at Pro Football Reference

Josh Watson (born May 20, 1996) is an American professional football linebacker. He played college football at Colorado State.

== Early life ==
Watson was born in Kansas City, Missouri and grew up in Blue Springs, Missouri and attended Blue Springs South High School. As a senior, he was named first-team All-Missouri and won the Mike Jones Award as the best linebacker in MSHSAA Class 6 after setting school records for tackles in a season with 177 and tackles in a game with 31.

== College career ==
Watson was a member of the Colorado State Rams for five seasons, redshirting his true freshman year. He played in all 13 of the Rams games as a redshirt freshman, making 37 tackles (six for loss) with one sack. He became a starter the following season and finished as CSU's second leading tackler with 90 tackles along with 7.5 tackles for a loss and 1.5 sacks. He finished his redshirt junior season with a team-high 109 tackles and 5.0 tackles for loss, 2.0 sacks, two interceptions, one forced fumble, one fumble recovery and seven pass breakups and was named honorable mention All-Mountain West Conference. He again led the Rams in tackles with 131, including 8.5 tackles for loss and one sack, with four passes broken up and two fumble recoveries and was named second-team All-Mountain West. Watson finished his collegiate career with 367 career tackles (27 for a loss), 3.5 sacks and two interceptions in 51 games played.

== Professional career ==
=== Denver Broncos ===
Watson signed with the Denver Broncos as an undrafted free agent on April 27, 2019. He was waived at the end of training camp during final roster cuts but was re-signed to the Broncos' practice squad on September 1, 2019. The Broncos promoted Watson to the active roster on November 1. He made his NFL debut on November 3, 2019 against the Cleveland Browns.

On September 5, 2020, Watson was waived by the Broncos, and was signed to the practice squad the following day. He was elevated to the active roster on October 1, October 17, November 14, November 21, November 28, December 5, December 12, and December 18 for the team's weeks 4, 6, 10, 11, 12, 13, 14, and 15 games against the New York Jets, New England Patriots, Las Vegas Raiders, Miami Dolphins, New Orleans Saints, Kansas City Chiefs, Carolina Panthers, and Buffalo Bills, and reverted to the practice squad after each game. His eight weekly elevations were the most in the NFL in 2020. He was promoted to the active roster on January 2, 2021. On August 24, 2021, he was waived by the Broncos. He was waived on August 24, 2021.

=== Los Angeles Chargers ===
On October 5, 2021, Watson was signed to the Los Angeles Chargers practice squad. He was released on October 25.

=== Carolina Panthers (first stint) ===
On November 12, 2021, Watson was signed to the Carolina Panthers practice squad. He was released on December 16.

=== Houston Texans ===
On December 21, 2021, Watson was signed to the Houston Texans practice squad. He signed a reserve/future contract with the Texans on January 11, 2022. He was waived on March 23, 2022.

=== Carolina Panthers (second stint) ===
On August 17, 2022, Watson signed with the Panthers. He was released on August 30.

=== Arlington Renegades ===
On November 17, 2022, Watson was drafted by the Arlington Renegades of the XFL.

== Personal life ==
Watson's father, Steven, played college football at Arkansas-Pine Bluff. He is a cousin of Heisman Trophy winner and NFL running back Billy Sims.
