= Jake Rodgers =

American football player (born 1991)

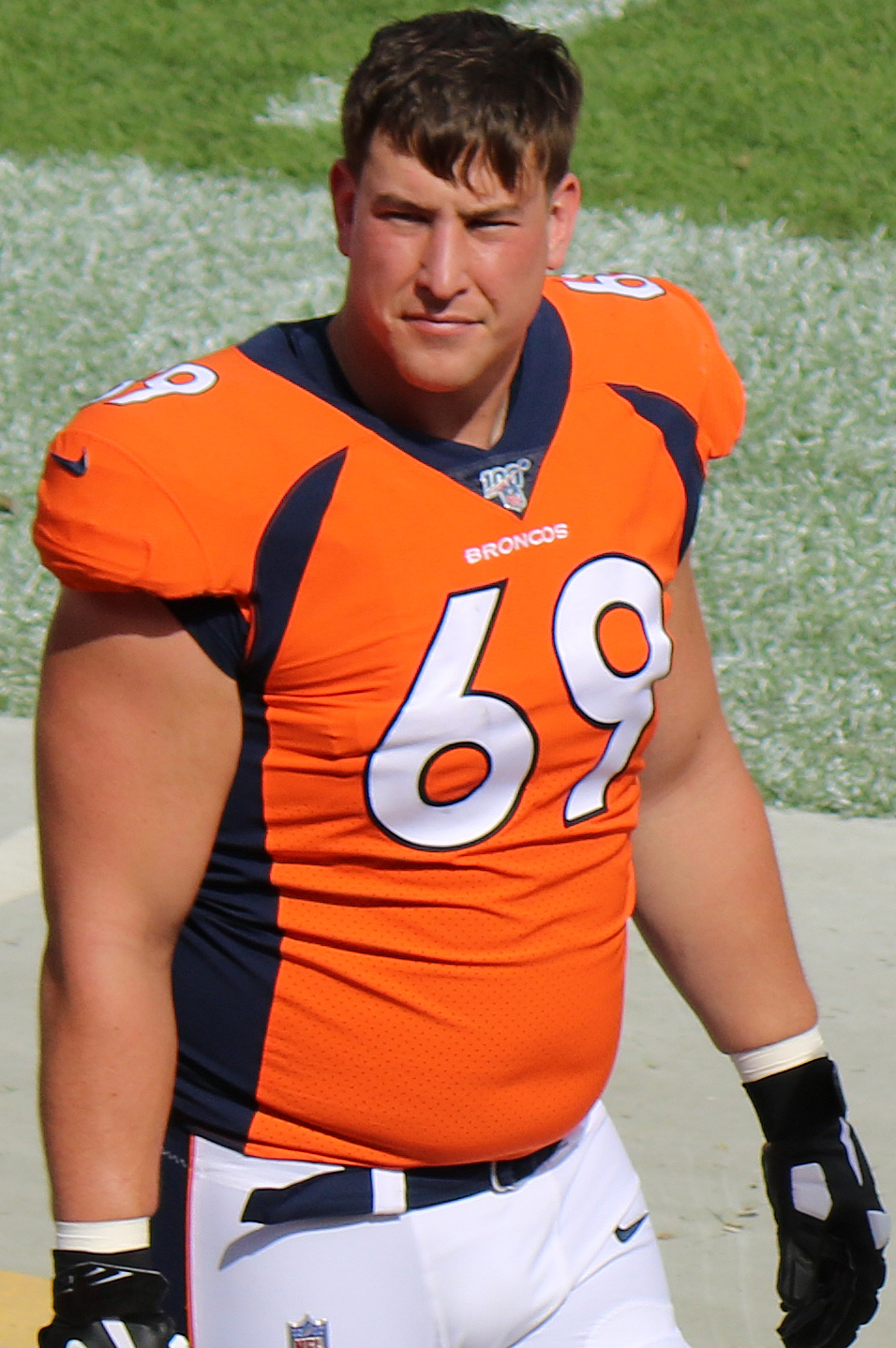
- Rodgers with the Denver Broncos in 2019

No. 69
- Position: Offensive tackle

Personal information
- Born: September 10, 1991 (age 35); Spokane, Washington, U.S.
- Listed height: 6 ft 6 in (1.98 m)
- Listed weight: 320 lb (145 kg)

Career information
- High school: Shadle Park (Spokane)
- College: Eastern Washington
- NFL draft: 2015: 7th round, 225th overall pick

Career history
- Atlanta Falcons (2015)*; New York Giants (2015–2016)*; Carolina Panthers (2016–2017)*; Pittsburgh Steelers (2017)*; Los Angeles Chargers (2017)*; Pittsburgh Steelers (2017)*; Houston Texans (2017–2018)*; Pittsburgh Steelers (2018)*; Baltimore Ravens (2018)*; Denver Broncos (2019–2020); Baltimore Ravens (2020)
- * Offseason or practice squad member only

Awards and highlights
- First-team FCS All-American (2014); First-team All-Big Sky Conference (2014)

Career NFL statistics
- Games played: 19
- Games started: 1
- Stats at Pro Football Reference

Jake Rodgers (born September 10, 1991) is an American former professional football player who was an offensive tackle in the National Football League (NFL). He played college football for Washington State Cougars and Eastern Washington Eagles. Rodgers was selected by the Atlanta Falcons in the seventh round of the 2015 NFL draft. Rodgers was also a member of the New York Giants, Carolina Panthers, Pittsburgh Steelers, Los Angeles Chargers, Houston Texans, Baltimore Ravens and Denver Broncos.

== Professional career ==
Pre-draft measurables
Height	Weight	40-yard dash	20-yard shuttle	Three-cone drill	Vertical jump	Broad jump	Bench press
6 ft 6 in (1.98 m)	320 lb (145 kg)	5.24 s	4.81 s	8.04 s	30.5 in (0.77 m)	8 ft 10 in (2.69 m)	24 reps
All values from his Pro Day

=== Atlanta Falcons ===
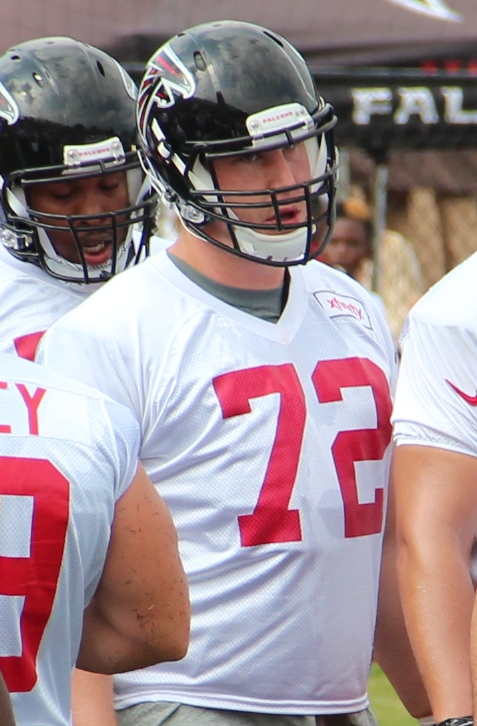
Rodgers with the Atlanta Falcons in 2015

Rodgers was selected by the Atlanta Falcons in the seventh round (225th overall) of the 2015 NFL draft. On September 4, 2015, he was waived by the Falcons.

=== New York Giants ===
On December 8, 2015, the New York Giants signed Rodgers to their practice squad.

On January 4, 2016, Rodgers signed a reserve/future contract with the Giants. On September 3, he was waived/injured by the Giants. He was released from injured reserve on September 12.

=== Carolina Panthers ===
On November 29, 2016, Rodgers was signed to the Carolina Panthers' practice squad. He was released on December 13. He signed a reserve/future contract with the Panthers on January 4, 2017.

On May 2, Rodgers was waived by the Panthers.

=== Pittsburgh Steelers (first stint) ===
On May 5, 2017, Rodgers signed with the Pittsburgh Steelers. He was waived on September 2. He was re-signed to the practice squad on September 20, only to be released six days later. He was re-signed on October 18, but released again on November 6.

=== Los Angeles Chargers ===
On November 15, 2017, Rodgers was signed to the Los Angeles Chargers' practice squad, but was released two days later.

=== Pittsburgh Steelers (second stint) ===
On November 20, 2017, Rodgers was signed to the Steelers' practice squad. He was released on December 21.

=== Houston Texans ===
On December 21, 2017, Rodgers was signed to the Houston Texans' practice squad. He signed a reserve/future contract with the Texans on January 1, 2018.

He was waived by the Texans on May 1.

=== Pittsburgh Steelers (third stint) ===
On May 2, 2018, Rodgers was claimed off waivers by the Steelers. He was waived on September 1.

=== Baltimore Ravens (first stint) ===
On December 12, 2018, Rodgers was signed to the Baltimore Ravens practice squad.

=== Denver Broncos ===
On April 22, 2019, Rodgers signed with the Denver Broncos. He was waived on September 1 and re-signed to the practice squad. He was promoted to the active roster on September 14.

Rodgers re-signed with the Broncos on April 23, 2020. He was waived on September 5, and was signed to the practice squad the following day. He was elevated to the active roster on October 1 for the team's Week 4 game against the New York Jets, and reverted to the practice squad after the game. He was promoted to the active roster on October 10, and waived on November 24.

=== Baltimore Ravens (second stint) ===
On November 25, 2020, Rodgers was claimed off waivers by the Ravens. He was waived two weeks later on December 7.
