= 2022 Senior Bowl =

American college football all-star game

2022 Reese's Senior Bowl
- 73rd Senior Bowl
National Team	American Team
20	10
Head coach: Ron Middleton (New York Jets)	Head coach: Duce Staley (Detroit Lions)
	1	2	3	4	Total
National	7	6	0	7	20
American	0	0	10	0	10
- Date: February 5, 2022
- Season: 2021
- Stadium: Hancock Whitney Stadium
- Location: Mobile, Alabama
- MVP: Perrion Winfrey (Oklahoma)
- Favorite: National by 2.5
- Referee: James Carter (SEC)
- Attendance: 20,478

United States TV coverage
- Network: NFL Network
- Announcers: Andrew Siciliano, Daniel Jeremiah, Charles Davis

The 2022 Senior Bowl was a college football all-star game played on February 5, 2022, at Hancock Whitney Stadium in Mobile, Alabama. The game featured prospects for the 2022 draft of the professional National Football League (NFL), predominantly from the NCAA Division I Football Bowl Subdivision (FBS). It was one of the final 2021–22 bowl games concluding the 2021 FBS football season. Sponsored by Reese's Peanut Butter Cups, the game was officially known as the Reese's Senior Bowl, with television coverage provided by NFL Network.

This was the first time the Senior Bowl was played in February. Head coaches for the game came from the coaching staffs of the Detroit Lions and New York Jets.

== Players ==
=== National team ===
Full roster online . Numerical rosters here (a number may be shared by an offensive and defensive player).

No.	Player	Position	HT/WT	College	Notes
94	Cal Adomitis	LS	6'1/234	Pittsburgh	
45	Troy Andersen	LB	6'3/242	Montana State (FCS)	
42	Brian Asamoah	LB	6'0/222	Oklahoma	
25	Tyler Badie	RB	5'7/199	Missouri	
81	Trae Barry	TE	6'6/244	Boston College	
56	Darrian Beavers	LB	6'4/234	Cincinnati	
--	Terrel Bernard	LB	6'0/220	Baylor	
29	Coby Bryant	DB	6'1/191	Cincinnati	
65	Ja'Tyre Carter	OL	6'5/276	Southern (FCS)	
22	Tariq Castro-Fields	DB	6'0/194	Penn State	
--	Jahan Dotson	WR	5'11/183	Penn State	
7	Romeo Doubs	WR	6'1/204	Nevada	2 receptions, 18 yards
17	Arnold Ebiketie	DL	6'2/250	Penn State	
78	Daniel Faalele	OL	6'8/387	Minnesota	
84	Jake Ferguson	TE	6'4/244	Wisconsin	3 receptions, 62 yards, 1 TD
4	Jerome Ford	RB	5'10/209	Cincinnati	
93	Haskell Garrett	DL	6'1/298	Ohio State	
--	Luke Goedeke	OL	6'4/318	Central Michigan	
92	Logan Hall	DL	6'5/278	Houston	
27	Jeremiah Hall	FB	6'1/241	Oklahoma	1 rush, 2 yards; 1 reception, 6 yards
--	Hassan Haskins	RB	6'1/220	Michigan	
54	Marquis Hayes	OL	6'4/318	Oklahoma	
67	Chasen Hines	OL	6'2/335	LSU	
20	Kyron Johnson	LB	6'0/230	Kansas	
77	Zion Johnson	OL	6'2/314	Boston College	
57	Travis Jones	DL	6'4/326	UConn	
36	Kerby Joseph	DB	6'0/200	Illinois	
6	Gregory Junior	DB	5'11/202	Ouachita Baptist (DII)	
87	Charlie Kolar	TE	6'6/256	Iowa State	
72	Abraham Lucas	OL	6'6/322	Washington State	
40	Jesse Luketa	LB	6'2/261	Penn State	
34	Boye Mafe	DL	6'3/255	Minnesota	
21	Damarri Mathis	DB	5'10/197	Pittsburgh	
85	Trey McBride	TE	6'3/249	Colorado State	2 receptions, 12 yards, 1 TD
2	Verone McKinley III	DB	5'11/194	Oregon	
18	Bo Melton	WR	5'10/191	Rutgers	2 receptions, 18 yards; 3 punt returns, 25 yards
15	Andrew Mevis	K	5'10/203	Iowa State	0/1 FG, 2/2 XP
48	Chad Muma	LB	6'2/241	Wyoming	
91	Otito Ogbonnia	DL	6'3/326	UCLA	
70	Trevor Penning	OL	6'6/330	Northern Iowa (FCS)	
8	Kenny Pickett	QB	6'3/221	Pittsburgh	6/6 passing, 89 yards, 1 TD
82	Alec Pierce	WR	6'2/208	Cincinnati	
8	Jalen Pitre	DB	5'10/196	Baylor	
76	Bernhard Raimann	OL	6'6/304	Central Michigan	
9	Desmond Ridder	QB	6'3/207	Cincinnati	4/6 passing, 68 yards, 2 TD; 3 rushes, 12 yards
11	Dominique Robinson	DL	6'4/254	Miami (OH)	
--	Mike Rose	LB	6'4/254	Iowa State	
--	Jeremy Ruckert	TE	6'5/250	Ohio State	
52	Myjai Sanders	DL	6'4/242	Cincinnati	
5	Braylon Sanders	WR	5'11/226	Ole Miss	
14	Khalil Shakir	WR	6'0/193	Boise State	
51	Tyreke Smith	DL	6'3/254	Ohio State	
28	Abram Smith	LB	5'11/211	Baylor	11 rushes, 48 yards; 2 receptions, 19 yards, 1 TD
96	Jordan Stout	P	6'3/205	Penn State	4 punts, 49.5-yard average
69	Cole Strange	OL	6'4/304	Chattanooga (FCS)	
12	Carson Strong	QB	6'3/226	Nevada	6/11 passing, 67 yards, 1 INT
71	Andrew Stueber	OL	6'6/327	Michigan	
95	Isaiah Thomas	DL	6'4/258	Oklahoma	
19	Cole Turner	TE	6'6/246	Nevada	2 receptions, 44 yards
73	Matt Waletzko	OL	6'6/310	North Dakota (FCS)	
0	Jaylen Watson	DB	6'1/197	Washington State	
1	Christian Watson	WR	6'4/211	North Dakota State (FCS)	1 reception, 38 yards
12	Sterling Weatherford	DB	6'3/230	Miami (OH)	
3	Rachaad White	RB	6'0/210	Arizona State	11 rushes, 52 yards; 1 reception, 7 yards
30	Joshua Williams	DB	6'2/193	Fayetteville State (DII)	
98	Perrion Winfrey	DL	6'3/303	Oklahoma	
9	JT Woods	DB	6'2/188	Baylor	1 INT (28-yard return)
75	Nick Zakelj	OL	6'5/318	Fordham (FCS)	

=== American team ===
Full roster online . Numerical rosters here (a number may be shared by an offensive and defensive player).

No.	Player	Position	HT/WT	College	Notes
35	Tycen Anderson	DB	6'1/204	Toledo	
83	Calvin Austin	WR	5'7/173	Memphis	2 receptions, 45 yards; 1 kick return, 6 yards
38	Amaré Barno	DL	6'4/239	Virginia Tech	
88	Daniel Bellinger	TE	6'4/252	San Diego State	
74	Spencer Burford	OL	6'3/293	UTSA	
80	Grant Calcaterra	TE	6'3/248	SMU	2 receptions, 14 yards
90	Jake Camarda	P	6'3/191	Georgia	6 punts, 51-yard average
50	Tariq Carpenter	DB	6'2/225	Georgia Tech	
17	Zachary Carter	DL	6'3/287	Florida	
18	Damone Clark	LB	6'4/239	LSU	
--	Micheal Clemons	DL	6'5/269	Texas A&M	
29	Yusuf Corker	DB	5'11/204	Kentucky	
16	Cameron Dicker	K	6'1/219	Texas	1/2 FG; 1/1 XP
13	JoJo Domann	LB	6'0/226	Nebraska	
81	Dontario Drummond	WR	6'0/217	Ole Miss	
85	Greg Dulcich	TE	6'3/245	UCLA	1 reception, 10 yards
53	Kingsley Enagbare	DL	6'3/261	South Carolina	
26	Akayleb Evans	DB	6'1/201	Missouri	
5	Jequez Ezzard	WR	5'10/195	Sam Houston State (FCS)	1 reception, 8 yards; 1 punt return, 1 yard
92	Neil Farrell Jr.	DL	6'3/238	LSU	
55	Luke Fortner	OL	6'3/302	Kentucky	
31	Mario Goodrich	DB	6'0/186	Clemson	
--	Danny Gray	WR	5'11/182	SMU	
33	Aaron Hansford	LB	6'2/239	Texas A&M	
30	Connor Heyward	FB	5'11/239	Michigan State	2 rushes, 6 yards; 1 reception, -2 yards
14	Sam Howell	QB	6'0/221	North Carolina	6/9 passing, 67 yards; 5 rushes, 29 yards, 1 TD
70	Ed Ingram	OL	6'3/317	LSU	
52	D'Marco Jackson	LB	6'0/235	Appalachian State	
99	Eric Johnson	DL	6'4/300	Missouri State	
96	Jermaine Johnson II	DL	6'4/259	Florida State	
1	Velus Jones Jr.	WR	5'11/203	Tennessee	4 receptions, 53 yards; 1 rush, -7 yards; 8 kick return yards; 1 punt return, -5 yards
77	Braxton Jones	OL	6'5/306	Southern Utah (FCS)	
12	Derion Kendrick	DB	5'11/202	Georgia	
65	Darian Kinnard	OL	6'4/324	Kentucky	
46	Isaiah Likely	TE	6'4/241	Coastal Carolina	
10	DeAngelo Malone	DL	6'3/234	Western Kentucky	
48	Phidarian Mathis	DL	6'3/313	Alabama	
75	Cade Mays	OL	6'4/321	Tennessee	
32	Zyon McCollum	DB	6'2/202	Sam Houston State (FCS)	
23	Roger McCreary	DB	5'11/189	Auburn	
73	Max Mitchell	OL	6'5/299	Louisiana	
9	Leon O'Neal Jr.	DB	6'0/211	Texas A&M	
56	Dylan Parham	OL	6'2/313	Memphis	
71	Chris Paul	OL	6'3/324	Tulsa	
27	Dameon Pierce	RB	5'9/220	Florida	5 rushes, 16 yards; 1 reception, 5 yards
4	T. J. Pledger	RB	5/9/196	Utah	5 rushes, 33 yards; 2 receptions, 24 yards
--	D'Vonte Price	RB	6'1/198	FIU	
98	John Ridgeway III	DL	6'4/327	Arkansas	
24	Brian Robinson Jr.	RB	6'1/226	Alabama	6 rushes, 18 yards
68	Jamaree Salyer	OL	6'2/320	Georgia	
54	Justin Shaffer	OL	6'3/326	Georgia	
47	Jordan Silver	LS	6'1/235	Arkansas	
52	Lecitus Smith	OL	6'3/321	Virginia Tech	
25	Cam Taylor-Britt	DB	5'10/200	Nebraska	
6	Alontae Taylor	DB	6'0/196	Tennessee	1 INT
--	Cameron Thomas	DL	6'4/264	San Diego State	
19	Josh Thompson	DB	5'10/199	Texas	
41	Channing Tindall	LB	6'1/223	Georgia	
8	Jalen Tolbert	WR	6'1/195	South Alabama	2 receptions, 24 yards
11	Tré Turner	WR	6'1/179	Virginia Tech	
--	ZaQuandre White	RB	5'11/212	South Carolina	
7	Sam Williams	DL	6'4/265	Ole Miss	
7	Malik Willis	QB	6'0/220	Liberty	2/4 passing, 11 yards; 4 rushes, 54 yards
20	Tariq Woolen	DB	6'3/205	UTSA	
95	Devonte Wyatt	DL	6'2/307	Georgia	
17	Bailey Zappe	QB	6'0/213	Western Kentucky	8/13 passing, 103 yards, 1 INT

== Game summary ==
2022 Senior Bowl

Quarter	1	2	3	4	Total
National	7	6	0	7	20
American	0	0	10	0	10

at Hancock Whitney Stadium • Mobile, Alabama

- Date: Saturday, February 5, 2022
- Game time: 2:30 p.m. EST
- Game attendance: 20.478
- Referee: James Carter
- TV: NFL Network
- Box score Report

Game information

First quarter

- (0:04) National – Abram Smith 20-yard touchdown reception from Kenny Pickett, Andrew Mevis kick good; National 7–0

Second quarter

- (1:54) National – Trey McBride 6-yard touchdown reception from Desmond Ridder, two-point conversion run stopped; National 13–0

Third quarter

- (3:20) American – Sam Howell 2-yard touchdown run; Cameron Dicker kick good; National 13–7
- (0:48) American – Cameron Dicker 38-yard field goal; National 13–10

Fourth quarter

- (11:04) National – Jake Ferguson 25-yard touchdown reception from Desmond Ridder; Andrew Mevis kick good; National 20–10
