= 2021 Mid-American Conference football season =

- League: NCAA Division I Football Bowl Subdivision
- Sport: Football
- Duration: September 2 - December 4
- Teams: 12

Regular season
- Season MVP: Dustin Crum
- East Division champions: Kent State
- West Division champions: Northern Illinois

MAC Championship Game
- Champions: Northern Illinois
- Runners-up: Kent State
- Finals MVP: Offense: Jay Ducker (RB, Northern Illinois); Defense: C. J. Brown (DB, Northern Illinois); Special Teams: John Richardson (PK, Northern Illinois)

Seasons
- 2020 2022

2021 Mid-American Conference football standings
	Conf.			Overall
Team	W		L	W		L
East Division
Kent State xy	6	–	2	7	–	7
Miami (OH)	5	–	3	7	–	6
Ohio	3	–	5	3	–	9
Bowling Green	2	–	6	4	–	8
Buffalo	2	–	6	4	–	8
Akron	1	–	7	2	–	10
West Division
Northern Illinois xy$	6	–	2	9	–	5
Central Michigan x	6	–	2	9	–	4
Toledo	5	–	3	7	–	6
Ball State	4	–	4	6	–	7
Eastern Michigan	4	–	4	7	–	6
Western Michigan	4	–	4	8	–	5
Championship: Northern Illinois 41, Kent State 23
$ – Conference champion; x – Division champion/co-champions; y – Championship game participant

The 2021 Mid-American Conference football season was the 76th season for the Mid-American Conference (MAC), as part of the 2021 NCAA Division I FBS football season.

The provisional schedule was released on February 26, 2021. The season was scheduled to begin September 2, 2021, and ended with the MAC Football Championship Game on December 4, 2021.

== Preseason ==
=== Preseason Media Poll ===
The Preseason Media Poll was announced on July 20. Kent State was voted the favorite to win the East Division, while Ball State was voted as favorite for the West Division. Ball State was also the favorite to win the conference championship game.

East
Predicted finish	Team	Points (votes for first place)
1	Kent State	112 (11)
2	Ohio	96 (2)
3	Miami (OH)	94 (5)
4	Buffalo	93 (4)
5	Akron	39
6	Bowling Green	28

West
Predicted finish	Team	Points (votes for first place)
1	Ball State	114 (11)
2	Toledo	104 (7)
3	Western Michigan	103 (4)
4	Central Michigan	68
5	Eastern Michigan	44
6	Northern Illinois	29

=== Preseason awards ===
The following list contains MAC players included on watch lists for national awards.

Award	Head coach/Player	School	Position	Link
Maxwell Award	Kevin Marks	Buffalo	RB	
Maxwell Award	Preston Hutchinson	Eastern Michigan	QB	
Maxwell Award	Dustin Crum	Kent State	QB	
Maxwell Award	Kaleb Eleby	Western Michigan	QB	
Bednarik Award	James Patterson	Buffalo	LB	
Bednarik Award	Troy Hairston	Central Michigan	DE	
Bednarik Award	Troy Brown	Central Michigan	LB	
Bednarik Award	Desjuan Johnson	Toledo	DT	
Bednarik Award	Ralph Holley	Western Michigan	DT	
Davey O'Brien Award	Dustin Crum	Kent State	QB	
Doak Walker Award	Darius Boone	Eastern Michigan	RB	
Doak Walker Award	Bryant Koback	Toledo	RB	
Doak Walker Award	Kobe Lewis	Central Michigan	RB	
Doak Walker Award	Kevin Marks	Buffalo	RB	
Doak Walker Award	Lew Nichols III	Central Michigan	RB	
Fred Biletnikoff Award	Justin Hall	Ball State	WR	
John Mackey Award	Thomas Odukoya	Eastern Michigan	TE	
John Mackey Award	Ryan Luehrman	Ohio	TE	
Rimington Trophy	Braydon Patton	Northern Illinois	C	
Rimington Trophy	Bryce Harris	Toledo	C	
Butkus Award	James Patterson	Buffalo	LB	
Outland Trophy	Curtis Blackwell	Ball State	C	
Outland Trophy	Mike Caliendo	Western Michigan	C	
Outland Trophy	Jake Fuzak	Buffalo	OT	
Outland Trophy	Bryce Harris	Toledo	C	
Bronko Nagurski Trophy	Troy Brown	Central Michigan	LB	
Bronko Nagurski Trophy	Ralph Holley	Western Michigan	DT	
Bronko Nagurski Trophy	Desjuan Johnson	Toledo	DT	
Bronko Nagurski Trophy	Brandon Martin	Ball State	LB	
Lou Groza Award	Marshall Meeder	Central Michigan	K	
Paul Hornung Award	Justin Hall	Ball State	WR	
Paul Hornung Award	Kalil Pimpleton	Central Michigan	WR	
Paul Hornung Award	Clint Ratkovich	Northern Illinois	RB	
Wuerffel Trophy	Bubba Arslanian	Akron	LB	
Wuerffel Trophy	Brandon Martin	Ball State	LB	
Wuerffel Trophy	Bryce Cosby	Ball State	DB	
Wuerffel Trophy	Tariq Speights	Eastern Michigan	LB	
Wuerffel Trophy	Isaac Vance	Kent State	WR	
Wuerffel Trophy	Sam Allan	Kent State	OL	
Wuerffel Trophy	Bailey Flint	Toledo	P	
Wuerffel Trophy	Mike Calidendo	Western Michigan	OL	
Walter Camp Award	Dustin Crum	Kent State	QB	
Manning Award	Dustin Crum	Kent State	QB	
Manning Award	Kaleb Eleby	Western Michigan	QB	
Manning Award	Drew Plitt	Ball State	QB	
Ray Guy Award	Bailey Flint	Toledo	P	
Ray Guy Award	Dom Dzioban	Miami (OH)	P	
Ray Guy Award	Jake Julian	Eastern Michigan	P	
Ray Guy Award	Luke Elzinga	Central Michigan	P	
Ray Guy Award	Matt Ference	Northern Illinois	P	
Ray Guy Award	Matt Naranjo	Bowling Green	P	
Ray Guy Award	Nick Mihalic	Western Michigan	P	
Johnny Unitas Golden Arm Award	Dustin Crum	Kent State	QB	
Johnny Unitas Golden Arm Award	Drew Plitt	Ball State	QB	
Johnny Unitas Golden Arm Award	Kyle Vantrease	Buffalo	QB	

== Head coaches ==
Lance Leipold, who had been head coach of Buffalo since 2015, left the MAC to take the head coach position with the Kansas Jayhawks of the Big 12 Conference. Leipold was replaced by interim head coach Rob Ianello during the school's search for a new permanent coach. However, Ianello and several other Buffalo assistant coaches were tabbed to join Leipold at Kansas, leaving a temporary vacancy at the team's head coaching position. Michigan co-defensive coordinator Maurice Linguist was later hired as Buffalo's new permanent coach.

On July 14, Frank Solich announced his retirement from the head coach position at Ohio after 16 seasons with the school. Tim Albin was promoted to head coach to fill Solich's vacancy.

Team	Head coach	Previous Job	Years at school	Overall record	MAC record	MAC titles
Akron	Tom Arth	Chattanooga	3	50–38 (.568)	1–13 (.071)	0
Ball State	Mike Neu	New Orleans Saints (QB Coach)	6	22–34 (.393)	13–25 (.342)	1
Bowling Green	Scot Loeffler	Boston College (Off. coordinator/QB coach)	3	3–14 (.176)	2–11 (.154)	0
Buffalo	Maurice Linguist	Michigan (Co def. coordinator)	1	0–0 (–)	0–0 (–)	0
Central Michigan	Jim McElwain	Florida	3	55–36 (.604)	9–5 (.643)	0
Eastern Michigan	Chris Creighton	Drake	8	166–97 (.631)	18–36 (.333)	0
Kent State	Sean Lewis	Syracuse (Co Off. Coordinator)	3	12–17 (.414)	9–11 (.450)	0
Miami	Chuck Martin	Notre Dame (Off. coordinator/QB coach)	7	106–53 (.667)	28–23 (.549)	1
Northern Illinois	Thomas Hammock	Baltimore Ravens (running backs coach)	3	5–13 (.278)	4–10 (.286)	0
Ohio	Tim Albin	Ohio (associate head coach)	1	25–8 (.758)	0–0 (–)	0
Toledo	Jason Candle	Toledo (Off. Coordinator)	6	38–21 (.644)	25–13 (.658)	1
Western Michigan	Tim Lester	Purdue (QB Coach)	5	54–43 (.557)	18–12 (.600)	0

=== Mid-season changes ===
- On November 4, Tom Arth was fired as head coach at Akron after posting a 3–24 record with the school in 3 years. Oscar Rodriguez, who was formerly the school's inside linebacker coach and associate head coach, was named interim head coach. On December 4, the school announced Oregon offensive coordinator Joe Moorhead as the new permanent head coach.

== Rankings ==
		Pre	Wk 1	Wk 2	Wk 3	Wk 4	Wk 5	Wk 6	Wk 7	Wk 8	Wk 9	Wk 10	Wk 11	Wk 12	Wk 13	Wk 14	Final
Akron	AP																
Akron	C																
Akron	CFP	Not released															
Ball State	AP	RV	RV														
Ball State	C	RV	RV														
Ball State	CFP	Not released															
Bowling Green	AP																
Bowling Green	C																
Bowling Green	CFP	Not released															
Buffalo	AP																
Buffalo	C																
Buffalo	CFP	Not released															
Central Michigan	AP																
Central Michigan	C																
Central Michigan	CFP	Not released															
Eastern Michigan	AP																
Eastern Michigan	C																
Eastern Michigan	CFP	Not released															
Kent State	AP																
Kent State	C																
Kent State	CFP	Not released															
Miami	AP																
Miami	C																
Miami	CFP	Not released															
Northern Illinois	AP															RV	
Northern Illinois	C																
Northern Illinois	CFP	Not released															
Ohio	AP																
Ohio	C																
Ohio	CFP	Not released															
Toledo	AP			RV													
Toledo	C																
Toledo	CFP	Not released															
Western Michigan	AP						RV										
Western Michigan	C						RV										
Western Michigan	CFP	Not released															

Legend
	Improvement in ranking
	Drop in ranking
	Not ranked previous week
	No change in ranking from previous week
RV	Received votes but were not ranked in Top 25 of poll
т	Tied with team above or below also with this symbol

== Schedule ==
Index to colors and formatting
MAC member won
MAC member lost
MAC teams in **bold**

All times Eastern time.

=== Week 1 ===
Date	Time	Visiting team	Home team	Site	TV	Result	Attendance	Ref.
September 2	7:00 p.m.	Western Illinois	**Ball State**	Scheumann Stadium • Muncie, IN	ESPN+	**W** 31–21	13,149	
September 2	7:00 p.m.	Wagner	**Buffalo**	UB Stadium • Buffalo, NY	ESPN3	**W** 69–7	13,063	
September 2	8:00 p.m.	**Bowling Green**	Tennessee	Neyland Stadium • Knoxville, TN	SECN	**L** 6–38	84,314	
September 3	7:00 p.m.	Saint Francis	**Eastern Michigan**	Rynearson Stadium • Ypsilanti, MI	ESPN3	**W** 35–15	16,461	
September 4	12:00 p.m.	**Western Michigan**	Michigan	Michigan Stadium • Ann Arbor, MI	ESPN	**L** 14–47	109,295	
September 4	3:30 p.m.	**Miami (OH)**	No. 8 Cincinnati	Nippert Stadium • Cincinnati, OH (Victory Bell)	ESPN+	**L** 14–49	37,978	
September 4	4:00 p.m.	**Central Michigan**	Missouri	Faurot Field • Columbia, MO	SECN	**L** 24–34	46,237	
September 4	7:00 p.m.	Norfolk State	**Toledo**	Glass Bowl • Toledo, OH	ESPN3	**W** 49–10		
September 4	7:00 p.m.	**Akron**	Auburn	Jordan–Hare Stadium • Auburn, AL	SECN	**L** 10–60	83,821	
September 4	7:00 p.m.	Syracuse	**Ohio**	Peden Stadium • Athens, OH	CBSSN	**L** 9–29	23,904	
September 4	7:30 p.m.	**Northern Illinois**	Georgia Tech	Bobby Dodd Stadium • Atlanta, GA	ACCN	**W** 22–21	33,651	
September 4	8:00 p.m.	**Kent State**	No. 6 Texas A&M	Kyle Field • College Station, TX	ESPNU	**L** 10–41	97,339	
^{#}Rankings from AP Poll released prior to game. All times are in Eastern Time.

=== Week 2 ===
Date	Time	Visiting team	Home team	Site	TV	Result	Attendance	Ref.
September 11	11:30 a.m.	No. 18 (FCS) VMI	**Kent State**	Dix Stadium • Kent, OH	ESPN3	**W** 60–10	16,785	
September 11	12:00 p.m.	**Miami (OH)**	Minnesota	TCF Bank Stadium • Minneapolis, MN	ESPNU	**L** 26–31	43,372	
September 11	1:30 p.m.	Wyoming	**Northern Illinois**	Huskie Stadium • DeKalb, IL	ESPN+	**L** 43–50	11,334	
September 11	2:00 p.m.	Duquesne	**Ohio**	Peden Stadium • Athens, OH	ESPN3	**L** 26–28	19,411	
September 11	2:30 p.m.	**Toledo**	No. 8 Notre Dame	Notre Dame Stadium • South Bend, IN	Peacock	**L** 29–32	62,009	
September 11	3:00 p.m.	Robert Morris	**Central Michigan**	Kelly/Shorts Stadium • Mount Pleasant, MI	ESPN3	**W** 45–0	16,128	
September 11	3:30 p.m.	**Ball State**	No. 11 Penn State	Beaver Stadium • University Park, PA	FS1	**L** 13–44	105,323	
September 11	3:30 p.m.	**Buffalo**	Nebraska	Memorial Stadium • Lincoln, NE	BTN	**L** 3–28	85,663	
September 11	3:30 p.m.	Temple	**Akron**	InfoCision Stadium • Akron, OH	ESPN+	**L** 24–45	14,474	
September 11	4:00 p.m.	South Alabama	**Bowling Green**	Doyt Perry Stadium • Bowling Green, OH	ESPN+	**L** 19–22	15,105	
September 11	5:00 p.m.	Illinois State	**Western Michigan**	Waldo Stadium • Kalamazoo, MI	ESPN3	**W** 28–0	18,122	
September 11	7:00 p.m.	**Eastern Michigan**	No. 18 Wisconsin	Camp Randall Stadium • Madison, WI	FS1	**L** 7–34	70,967	
^{#}Rankings from AP Poll released prior to game. All times are in Eastern Time.

=== Week 3 ===
Date	Time	Visiting team	Home team	Site	TV	Result	Attendance	Ref.
September 16	8:00 p.m.	**Ohio**	Louisiana	Cajun Field • Lafayette, LA	ESPN	**L** 14–49	17,709	
September 18	12:00 p.m.	No. 16 Coastal Carolina	**Buffalo**	UB Stadium • Buffalo, NY	ESPN2	**L** 25–28	16,739	
September 18	12:00 p.m.	**Western Michigan**	Pittsburgh	Heinz Field • Pittsburgh, PA	ESPN3	**W** 44–41	40,581	
September 18	12:00 p.m.	**Northern Illinois**	No. 25 Michigan	Michigan Stadium • Ann Arbor, MI	BTN	**L** 10–63	106,263	
September 18	3:30 p.m.	**Kent State**	No. 5 Iowa	Kinnick Stadium • Iowa City, IA	BTN	**L** 7–30	61,932	
September 18	3:30 p.m.	**Eastern Michigan**	UMass	Warren McGuirk Alumni Stadium • Amherst, MA	FloSports/NESN+	**W** 42–28	7,012	
September 18	3:30 p.m.	LIU	**Miami (OH)**	Yager Stadium • Oxford, OH	ESPN+	**W** 42–7	12,036	
September 18	3:30 p.m.	Bryant	**Akron**	InfoCision Stadium • Akron, OH	ESPN3	**W** 35–14	8,779	
September 18	4:00 p.m.	**Ball State**	Wyoming	War Memorial Stadium • Laramie, WY	Stadium	**L** 12–45	23,467	
September 18	4:00 p.m.	Colorado State	**Toledo**	Glass Bowl • Toledo, OH	ESPNU	**L** 6–22	21,365	
September 18	5:00 p.m.	Murray State	**Bowling Green**	Doyt Perry Stadium • Bowling Green, OH	ESPN3	**W** 27–10	20,097	
September 18	7:30 p.m.	**Central Michigan**	LSU	Tiger Stadium • Baton Rouge, LA	SECN	**L** 21–49	92,547	
^{#}Rankings from AP Poll released prior to game. All times are in Eastern Time.

=== Week 4 ===
Date	Time	Visiting team	Home team	Site	TV	Result	Attendance	Ref.
September 25	12:00 p.m.	FIU	**Central Michigan**	Kelly/Shorts Stadium • Mount Pleasant, MI	ESPN+	**W** 31–27	18,382	
September 25	12:00 p.m.	**Bowling Green**	Minnesota	TCF Bank Stadium • Minneapolis, MN	ESPNU	**W** 14–10	46,236	
September 25	12:00 p.m.	**Ohio**	Northwestern	Ryan Field • Evanston, IL	BTN	**L** 6–35	27,129	
September 25	12:00 p.m.	**Miami (OH)**	Army	Michie Stadium • West Point, NY	CBSSN	**L** 10–23	24,045	
September 25	2:00 p.m.	San Jose State	**Western Michigan**	Waldo Stadium • Kalamazoo, MI	ESPN+	**W** 23–3	12,317	
September 25	2:00 p.m.	**Toledo**	**Ball State**	Scheumann Stadium • Muncie, IN	ESPN+	**TOL** 22–12	14,902	
September 25	2:00 p.m.	Texas State	**Eastern Michigan**	Rynearson Stadium • Ypsilanti, MI	ESPN+	**W** 59–21	14,253	
September 25	2:30 p.m.	Maine	**Northern Illinois**	Huskie Stadium • DeKalb, IL	ESPN3	**W** 41–14	10,076	
September 25	3:30 p.m.	**Kent State**	Maryland	Maryland Stadium • College Park, MD	BTN	**L** 16–37	30,117	
September 25	6:00 p.m.	**Buffalo**	Old Dominion	S.B. Ballard Stadium • Norfolk, VA	ESPN+	**W** 35–34		
September 25	7:30 p.m.	**Akron**	No. 10 Ohio State	Ohio Stadium • Columbus, OH	BTN	**L** 7–59	95,178	
^{#}Rankings from AP Poll released prior to game. All times are in Eastern Time.

=== Week 5 ===
Date	Time	Visiting team	Home team	Site	TV	Result	Attendance	Ref.
October 2	12:00 p.m.	**Toledo**	UMass	Warren McGuirk Alumni Stadium • Amherst, MA	FloFootball/NESN	**W** 45–7	9,456	
October 2	12:00 p.m.	**Western Michigan**	**Buffalo**	UB Stadium • Buffalo, NY	CBSSN	**WMU** 24–17	17,344	
October 2	2:30 p.m.	**Eastern Michigan**	**Northern Illinois**	Huskie Stadium • DeKalb, IL	ESPN+	**NIU** 27–20	10,034	
October 2	3:30 p.m.	**Bowling Green**	**Kent State**	Dix Stadium • Kent, OH (Anniversary Award)	ESPN+	**KSU** 27–20	20,537	
October 2	3:30 p.m.	**Central Michigan**	**Miami (OH)**	Yager Stadium • Oxford, OH	ESPN+	**M-OH** 28–17	12,616	
October 2	3:30 p.m.	**Ohio**	**Akron**	InfoCision Stadium • Akron, OH	ESPN3	**OU** 34–17	12,616	
October 2	5:00 p.m.	Army	**Ball State**	Scheumann Stadium • Muncie, IN	ESPN+	**W** 28–16	13,713	
^{#}Rankings from AP Poll released prior to game. All times are in Eastern Time.

=== Week 6 ===
Date	Time	Visiting team	Home team	Site	TV	Result	Attendance	Ref.
October 9	12:00 p.m.	Akron	Bowling Green	Doyt Perry Stadium • Bowling Green, OH	ESPN+	**AKR** 35–20	17,797	
October 9	12:00 p.m.	Northern Illinois	Toledo	Glass Bowl • Toledo, OH	CBSSN	**NIU** 22–20	21,284	
October 9	3:30 p.m.	Ball State	Western Michigan	Waldo Stadium • Kalamazoo, MI	ESPNU	**BSU** 45–20	11,403	
October 9	3:30 p.m.	Central Michigan	Ohio	Peden Stadium • Athens, OH	ESPN+	**CMU** 30–27	20,928	
October 9	3:30 p.m.	Miami (OH)	Eastern Michigan	Rynearson Stadium • Ypsilanti, MI	ESPN+	**EMU** 13–12	15,664	
October 9	7:00 p.m.	Buffalo	Kent State	Dix Stadium • Kent, OH	ESPNU	**KSU** 48–38	12,105	
^{#}Rankings from AP Poll released prior to game. All times are in Eastern Time.

=== Week 7 ===
Date	Time	Visiting team	Home team	Site	TV	Result	Attendance	Ref.
October 16	12:00 p.m.	Ohio	Buffalo	UB Stadium • Buffalo, NY	ESPN+	**UB** 27–26	12,909	
October 16	2:00 p.m.	Ball State	Eastern Michigan	Rynearson Stadium • Ypsilanti, MI	ESPN+	**BSU** 38–31	15,258	
October 16	2:30 p.m.	Akron	Miami (OH)	Yager Stadium • Oxford, OH	ESPN+	**M-OH** 34–21	11,042	
October 16	3:30 p.m.	Toledo	Central Michigan	Kelly/Shorts Stadium • Mount Pleasant, MI	CBSSN	**CMU** 26–23 ^{OT}	20,112	
October 16	3:30 p.m.	Bowling Green	Northern Illinois	Huskie Stadium • DeKalb, IL	ESPN+	**NIU** 34–26	7,854	
October 16	3:30 p.m.	Kent State	Western Michigan	Waldo Stadium • Kalamazoo, MI	ESPNU	**WMU** 64–31	18,716	
^{#}Rankings from AP Poll released prior to game. All times are in Eastern Time.

=== Week 8 ===
Date	Time	Visiting team	Home team	Site	TV	Result	Attendance	Ref.
October 23	12:00 p.m.	Eastern Michigan	Bowling Green	Doyt Perry Stadium • Bowling Green, OH	ESPN+	**EMU** 55–24	10,875	
October 23	12:00 p.m.	Northern Illinois	Central Michigan	Kelly/Shorts Stadium • Mount Pleasant, MI	ESPNU	**NIU** 39–38	15,232	
October 23	1:00 p.m.	Kent State	Ohio	Peden Stadium • Athens, OH	ESPN+	**KSU** 34–27	15,854	
October 23	3:30 p.m.	Miami (OH)	Ball State	Scheumann Stadium • Muncie, IN (Red Bird Rivalry)	ESPN+	**M-OH** 24–17	15,703	
October 23	3:30 p.m.	Western Michigan	Toledo	Glass Bowl • Toledo, OH	CBSSN	**TOL** 34–15	19,906	
October 23	3:30 p.m.	Buffalo	Akron	InfoCision Stadium • Akron, OH	ESPN+	**UB** 45–10	8,635	
^{#}Rankings from AP Poll released prior to game. All times are in Eastern Time.

=== Week 9 ===
Date	Time	Visiting team	Home team	Site	TV	Result	Attendance	Ref.
October 30	12:00 p.m.	**Bowling Green**	**Buffalo**	UB Stadium • Buffalo, NY	CBSSN	**BGSU** 56–44	13,163	
^{#}Rankings from AP Poll released prior to game. All times are in Eastern Time.

=== Week 10 ===
Date	Time	Visiting team	Home team	Site	TV	Result	Attendance	Ref.
November 2	7:00 p.m.	**Ball State**	**Akron**	InfoCision Stadium • Akron, OH	CBSSN	**BSU** 31–25	7,683	
November 2	7:30 p.m.	**Eastern Michigan**	**Toledo**	Glass Bowl • Toledo, OH	ESPN2	**EMU** 52–49	14,997	
November 2	7:30 p.m.	**Miami (OH)**	**Ohio**	Peden Stadium • Athens, OH (Battle of the Bricks)	ESPNU	**OU** 35–33	15,940	
November 3	7:00 p.m.	**Central Michigan**	**Western Michigan**	Waldo Stadium • Kalamazoo, MI (Victory Cannon / Michigan MAC Trophy)	ESPNU	**CMU** 42–30	13,137	
November 3	7:00 p.m.	**Northern Illinois**	**Kent State**	Dix Stadium • Kent, OH	ESPN2	**KSU** 52–47	6,076	
^{#}Rankings from AP Poll released prior to game. All times are in Eastern Time.

=== Week 11 ===
Date	Time	Visiting team	Home team	Site	TV	Result	Attendance	Ref.
November 9	7:00 p.m.	Akron	Western Michigan	Waldo Stadium • Kalamazoo, MI	CBSSN	**WMU** 45–40	8,443	
November 9	7:00 p.m.	Buffalo	Miami (OH)	Yager Stadium • Oxford, OH	ESPNU	**M-OH** 45–18	10,069	
November 9	8:00 p.m.	Ohio	Eastern Michigan	Rynearson Stadium • Ypsilanti, MI	ESPN2	**OU** 34–26	13,636	
November 10	7:00 p.m.	Ball State	Northern Illinois	Huskie Stadium • DeKalb, IL (Bronze Stalk Trophy)	ESPN2	**NIU** 30–29	7,894	
November 10	7:00 p.m.	Toledo	Bowling Green	Doyt Perry Stadium • Bowling Green, OH (Battle of I-75)	CBSSN	**TOL** 49–17	18,349	
November 10	8:00 p.m.	Kent State	Central Michigan	Kelly/Shorts Stadium • Mount Pleasant, MI	ESPNU	**CMU** 54–30	9,213	
^{#}Rankings from AP Poll released prior to game. All times are in Eastern Time.

=== Week 12 ===
Date	Time	Visiting team	Home team	Site	TV	Result	Attendance	Ref.
November 16	7:00 p.m.	Toledo	Ohio	Peden Stadium • Athens, OH	ESPN+	**TOL** 35–23	9,716	
November 16	7:30 p.m.	Western Michigan	Eastern Michigan	Rynearson Stadium • Ypsilanti, MI (Michigan MAC Trophy)	ESPN2	**EMU** 22–21	15,272	
November 16	8:00 p.m.	Bowling Green	Miami (OH)	Yager Stadium • Oxford, OH	ESPNU	**M-OH** 34–7	10,269	
November 17	7:00 p.m.	Central Michigan	Ball State	Scheumann Stadium • Muncie, IN	ESPNU	**CMU** 37–17	5,602	
November 17	7:00 p.m.	Northern Illinois	Buffalo	UB Stadium • Buffalo, NY	ESPN2	**NIU** 33–27 ^{OT}	13,097	
November 20	12:00 p.m.	Kent State	Akron	InfoCision Stadium • Akron, OH (Wagon Wheel)	ESPN+	**KSU** 38–0	8,879	
^{#}Rankings from AP Poll released prior to game. All times are in Eastern Time.

=== Week 13 ===
Date	Time	Visiting team	Home team	Site	TV	Result	Attendance	Ref.
November 23	7:00 p.m.	Western Michigan	Northern Illinois	Huskie Stadium • DeKalb, IL	ESPNU	**WMU** 42–21	7,156	
November 23	7:00 p.m.	Buffalo	Ball State	Scheumann Stadium • Muncie, IN	ESPN+	**BSU** 20–3	6,112	
November 26	12:00 p.m.	Eastern Michigan	Central Michigan	Kelly/Shorts Stadium • Mount Pleasant, MI (rivalry / Michigan MAC Trophy)	ESPNU	**CMU** 31–10	7,708	
November 26	12:00 p.m.	Ohio	Bowling Green	Doyt Perry Stadium • Bowling Green, OH	CBSSN	**BGSU** 21–10	9,339	
November 27	12:00 p.m.	Akron	Toledo	Glass Bowl • Toledo, OH	ESPN+	**TOL** 49–14	11,282	
November 27	12:00 p.m.	Miami (OH)	Kent State	Dix Stadium • Kent, OH	ESPN+	**KSU** 48–47 ^{OT}	8,378	
^{#}Rankings from AP Poll released prior to game. All times are in Eastern Time.

=== MAC Conference Championship Game ===
Date	Time	Visiting team	Home team	Site	TV	Result	Attendance	Ref.
December 4	12:00 p.m.	**Kent State**	**Northern Illinois**	Ford Field • Detroit, MI	ESPN	**NIU** 41–23	10,317	
^{#}Rankings from AP Poll released prior to game. All times are in Eastern Time.

== Postseason ==
=== Bowl Games ===
Legend
MAC Win
MAC Loss

Bowl game	Date	Site	Television	Time (EST)	MAC team	Opponent	Score	Attendance
Bahamas Bowl	December 17	Thomas Robinson Stadium • Nassau, Bahamas	ESPN	12:00 p.m.	Toledo	Middle Tennessee	L 24–31	13,596
Cure Bowl	December 17	Exploria Stadium • Orlando, FL	ESPN2	6:00 p.m.	Northern Illinois	Coastal Carolina	L 41–47	9,784
LendingTree Bowl	December 18	Hancock Whitney Stadium • Mobile, AL	ESPN	5:45 p.m.	Eastern Michigan	Liberty	L 20–56	15,186
Famous Idaho Potato Bowl	December 21	Albertsons Stadium • Boise, ID	ESPN	3:30 p.m.	Kent State	Wyoming	L 38–52	10,217
Frisco Football Classic	December 23	Toyota Stadium • Frisco, TX	ESPN	3:30 p.m.	Miami (OH)	North Texas	W 27–14	11,721
Camellia Bowl	December 25	Cramton Bowl • Montgomery, AL	ESPN	2:30 p.m.	Ball State	Georgia State	L 20–51	
Quick Lane Bowl	December 27	Ford Field • Detroit, MI	ESPN	11:00 a.m.	Western Michigan	Nevada	W 52–24	22,321
Sun Bowl	December 31	Sun Bowl • El Paso, Texas	CBS	12:00 p.m.	Central Michigan	Washington State	W 24–21	34,540

- Central Michigan was originally slated to play in the Arizona Bowl on December 31 against Boise State, but the bowl was cancelled when Boise State was forced to withdraw due to a COVID-19 outbreak within their team. Central Michigan was then invited to play in the Sun Bowl on the same date to replace Miami (FL), who had withdrawn from that bowl due to COVID-19 as well.

== MAC records vs other conferences ==
2021–2022 records against non-conference foes:

Power Conferences 5	Record
ACC	2–1
Big Ten	1–10
Big 12	0–0
Pac-12	0–0
BYU/Notre Dame	0–1
SEC	0–5
Power 5 Total	3–17
Other FBS Conferences	Record
American	0–2
C–USA	2–0
Independents (Excluding Notre Dame)	3–1
Mountain West	1–3
Sun Belt	1–3
Other FBS Total	5–9
FCS Opponents	Record
Football Championship Subdivision	11–1
Total Non-Conference Record	23–27

=== Mid-American vs Power 5 matchups ===
This is a list of games the MAC has scheduled versus power conference teams (ACC, Big 10, Big 12, Pac-12, BYU, Notre Dame and SEC). All rankings are from the current AP Poll at the time of the game.

Date	Conference	Visitor	Home	Site	Score
September 2	SEC	Bowling Green	Tennessee	Neyland Stadium • Knoxville, TN	L 6–38
September 4	Big Ten	Western Michigan	Michigan	Michigan Stadium • Ann Arbor, MI	L 14–47
September 4	SEC	Central Michigan	Missouri	Faurot Field • Columbia, MO	L 24–34
September 4	SEC	Akron	Auburn	Jordan–Hare Stadium • Auburn, AL	L 10–60
September 4	ACC	Syracuse	Ohio	Peden Stadium • Athens, OH	L 9–29
September 4	ACC	Northern Illinois	Georgia Tech	Bobby Dodd Stadium • Atlanta, GA	W 22–21
September 4	SEC	Kent State	No. 6 Texas A&M	Kyle Field • College Station, TX	L 10–41
September 11	Big Ten	Miami (OH)	Minnesota	TCF Bank Stadium • Minneapolis, MN	L 26–31
September 11	Independent	Toledo	No. 8 Notre Dame	Notre Dame Stadium • South Bend, IN	L 29–32
September 11	Big Ten	Ball State	No. 11 Penn State	Beaver Stadium • University Park, PA	L 13–44
September 11	Big Ten	Buffalo	Nebraska	Memorial Stadium • Lincoln, NE	L 3–28
September 11	Big Ten	Eastern Michigan	No. 18 Wisconsin	Camp Randall Stadium • Madison, WI	L 7–34
September 18	SEC	Central Michigan	LSU	Tiger Stadium • Baton Rouge, LA	L 21–49
September 18	Big Ten	Northern Illinois	No. 25 Michigan	Michigan Stadium • Ann Arbor, MI	L 10–63
September 18	ACC	Western Michigan	Pittsburgh	Heinz Field • Pittsburgh, PA	W 44–41
September 18	Big Ten	Kent State	No. 5 Iowa	Kinnick Stadium • Iowa Stadium, IA	L 7–30
September 25	Big Ten	Akron	No. 10 Ohio State	Ohio Stadium • Columbus, OH	L 7–59
September 25	Big Ten	Bowling Green	Minnesota	TCF Bank Stadium • Minneapolis, MN	W 14–10
September 25	Big Ten	Kent State	Maryland	Maryland Stadium • College Park, MD	L 16–37
September 25	Big Ten	Ohio	Northwestern	Ryan Field • Evanston, IL	L 6–35

=== Mid-American vs Group of Five matchups ===
The following games include MAC teams competing against teams from the American, C-USA, Mountain or Sun Belt.

Date	Conference	Visitor	Home	Site	Score
September 4	American	Miami (OH)	No. 8 Cincinnati	Nippert Stadium • Cincinnati, OH	L 14–49
September 11	Mountain West	Wyoming	Northern Illinois	Huskie Stadium • DeKalb, IL	L 43–50
September 11	American	Temple	Akron	InfoCiscion Stadium • Akron, OH	L 24–45
September 11	Sun Belt	South Alabama	Bowling Green	Doyt Perry Stadium • Bowling Green, OH	L 19–22
September 16	Sun Belt	Ohio	Louisiana	Cajun Field • Lafayette, LA	L 14–49
September 18	Mountain West	Ball State	Wyoming	War Memorial Stadium • Laramie, WY	L 12–45
September 18	Mountain West	Colorado State	Toledo	Glass Bowl • Toledo, OH	L 6–22
September 18	Sun Belt	No. 16 Coastal Carolina	Buffalo	UB Stadium • Buffalo, NY	L 25–28
September 25	C-USA	FIU	Central Michigan	Kelly/Shorts Stadium • Mount Pleasant, MI	W 31–27
September 25	Sun Belt	Texas State	Eastern Michigan	Rynearson Stadium • Ypsilanti, MI	W 59–21
September 25	Mountain West	San Jose State	Western Michigan	Waldo Stadium • Kalamazoo, MI	W 23–3
September 25	C-USA	Buffalo	Old Dominion	S.B. Ballard Stadium • Norfolk, VA	W 35–34

=== Mid-American vs FBS independents matchups ===
The following games include MAC teams competing against FBS Independents, which includes Army, Liberty, New Mexico State, UConn, or UMass.

Date	Conference	Visitor	Home	Site	Score
September 18	Independents	Eastern Michigan	UMass	Warren McGuirk Alumni Stadium • Amherst, MA	W 42–28
September 25	Independents	Miami (OH)	Army	Michie Stadium • West Point, NY	L 10–23
October 2	Independents	Toledo	UMass	Warren McGuirk Alumni Stadium • Amherst, MA	W 45–9
October 2	Independents	Army	Ball State	Scheumann Stadium • Muncie, IN	W 28–16

=== Mid-American vs FCS matchups ===
Date	Visitor	Home	Site	Score
September 2	Western Illinois	Ball State	Scheumann Stadium • Muncie, IN	W 31–21
September 2	Wagner	Buffalo	UB Stadium • Buffalo, NY	W 69–7
September 3	St. Francis	Eastern Michigan	Rynearson Stadium • Ypsilanti, MI	W 35–15
September 4	Norfolk State	Toledo	Glass Bowl • Toledo, OH	W 49–10
September 11	VMI	Kent State	Dix Stadium • Kent, OH	W 60–10
September 11	Duquesne	Ohio	Peden Stadium • Athens, OH	L 26–28
September 11	Robert Morris	Central Michigan	Kelly/Shorts Stadium • Mount Pleasant, MI	W 45–0
September 11	Illinois State	Western Michigan	Waldo Stadium • Kalamazoo, MI	W 28–0
September 18	Bryant	Akron	InfoCiscion Stadium • Akron, OH	W 35–14
September 18	Murray State	Bowling Green	Doyt Perry Stadium • Bowling Green, OH	W 27–10
September 18	LIU	Miami (OH)	Yager Stadium • Oxford, OH	W 42–7
September 25	Maine	Northern Illinois	Huskie Stadium • DeKalb, IL	W 41–14

== Awards and honors ==
=== Player of the week honors ===
==== East Division ====
Week	Offensive			Defensive			Special teams		
Week	Player	Team	Position	Player	Team	Position	Player	Team	Position
Week 1 (September 6)	Kyle Vantrease	Buffalo	QB	Darren Anders	Bowling Green	LB	Josh Smith	Kent State	P
Week 2 (September 13)	Matt McDonald	Bowling Green	QB	Bubba Arslanian; Montre Miller	Akron; Kent State	LB; CB	Graham Nicholson	Miami (OH)	K
Week 3 (September 20)	DJ Irons	Akron	QB	Taylor Riggins	Buffalo	DE	Jonah Wieland	Ohio	P
Week 4 (September 27)	Matt McDonald	Bowling Green	QB	Brock Horne	Bowling Green	LB	Matt Naranjo	Bowling Green	P
Week 5 (October 4)	De'Montre Tuggle	Ohio	RB	Will Evans	Ohio	DE	Nate Needham	Bowling Green	K
Week 6 (October 11)	Dustin Crum	Kent State	QB	Tyson Durant	Akron	CB	Graham Nicholson (2)	Miami (OH)	K
Week 7 (October 18)	Dylan McDuffie	Buffalo	RB	James Patterson	Buffalo	LB	Nate Needham (2)	Bowling Green	K
Week 8 (October 25)	Dustin Crum (2)	Kent State	QB	Manny Lawrence-Burke	Kent State	LB	Alex McNulty	Buffalo	K
Week 9/10 (November 8)	Dustin Crum (3)	Kent State	QB	Nico Bolden	Kent State	S	Andrew Glass	Kent State	K
Week 11 (November 15)	Brett Gabbert	Miami (OH)	QB	Kam Butler	Miami (OH)	DE	Michael Mathison	Akron	WR/KR
Week 12 (November 22)	Dustin Crum (4)	Kent State	QB	CJ West	Kent State	DL	Andrew Glass (2)	Kent State	K
Week 13 (November 29)	Xavier Williams	Kent State	RB	Montre Miller (2)	Kent State	CB	Nate Needham (3)	Bowling Green	K

==== West Division ====
Week	Offensive			Defensive			Special teams		
Week	Player	Team	Position	Player	Team	Position	Player	Team	Position
Week 1 (September 6)	Harrison Waylee	Northern Illinois	RB	Lance Deveaux Jr.	Northern Illinois	LB	Matt Ference	Northern Illinois	P
Week 2 (September 13)	Harrison Waylee (2)	Northern Illinois	RB	Dyontae Johnson	Toledo	LB	Bailey Flint	Toledo	P
Week 3 (September 20)	Kaleb Eleby	Western Michigan	QB	Zaire Barnes	Western Michigan	LB	Nathan Snyder	Ball State	P
Week 4 (September 27)	Rocky Lombardi; Ben Bryant	Northern Illinois; Eastern Michigan	QB; QB	Ali Fayad	Western Michigan	DL	Chad Ryland	Eastern Michigan	K
Week 5 (October 4)	Skyy Moore	Western Michigan	WR	Dillon Thomas	Northern Illinois	LB	Justin Hall	Ball State	WR/RS
Week 6 (October 11)	Drew Plitt	Ball State	QB	Bryce Cosby	Ball State	S	John Richardson	Northern Illinois	K
Week 7 (October 18)	Kaleb Eleby (2); Jay Ducker	Western Michigan; Northern Illinois	QB; RB	Bryce Cosby (2)	Ball State	S	Marshall Meeder	Central Michigan	K
Week 8 (October 25)	Rocky Lombardi (2)	Northern Illinois	QB	Desjuan Johnson	Toledo	DT	Kanon Woodill	Northern Illinois	K
Week 9/10 (November 8)	Trayvon Rudolph; Hassan Beydoun	Northern Illinois; Eastern Michigan	WR; WR	Jose Ramirez	Eastern Michigan	DE	Kalil Pimpleton	Central Michigan	KR
Week 11 (November 15)	Lew Nichols III	Central Michigan	RB	Jamal Hines	Toledo	LB	Chad Ryland (2); John Richardson (2)	Eastern Michigan; Northern Illinois	K K
Week 12 (November 22)	Lew Nichols III (2); Bryant Koback	Central Michigan; Toledo	RB; RB	C. J. Brown	Northern Illinois	S	Chad Ryland (3)	Eastern Michigan	K
Week 13 (November 29)	Skyy Moore (2)	Western Michigan	WR	Jamal Hines (2)	Toledo	LB	Jake Julien	Eastern Michigan	P

=== MAC Individual awards ===
The following individuals received postseason honors as voted by the Mid-American Conference football coaches at the end of the season.

Award	Player	School
Offensive Player of the Year	Lew Nichols III	Central Michigan
Defensive Player of the Year	Ali Fayad	Western Michigan
Special Teams Player of the Year	Kalil Pimpleton	Central Michigan
Freshman Player of the Year	Jay Ducker	Northern Illinois
Vern Smith Leadership Award	Dustin Crum	Kent State
Coach of the Year	Thomas Hammock	Northern Illinois

=== All-Conference Teams ===
The following players were listed as part of the All-Conference teams.

Position	Player	Team
First Team Offense
WR	Kalil Pimpleton	Central Michigan
WR	Dante Cephas	Kent State
WR	Jack Sorenson	Miami
WR	Skyy Moore	Western Michigan
OL	Sidy Sow	Eastern Michigan
OL	Bernhard Raimann	Central Michigan
OL	Luke Goedeke	Central Michigan
OL	Bryce Harris	Toledo
OL	Mike Caliendo	Western Michigan
TE	Christian Sims	Bowling Green
QB	Dustin Crum	Kent State
RB	Lew Nichols III	Central Michigan
RB	Bryant Koback	Toledo
PK	Nate Needham	Bowling Green
First Team Defense
DL	Troy Hairston	Central Michigan
DL	Kameron Butler	Miami
DL	Jamal Hines	Toledo
DL	Ali Fayad	Western Michigan
LB	Darren Anders	Bowling Green
LB	James Patterson	Buffalo
LB	Troy Brown	Central Michigan
LB	Ivan Pace Jr.	Miami
DB	Bryce Cosby	Ball State
DB	Elvis Hines	Kent State
DB	C.J. Brown	Northern Illinois
DB	Samuel Womack	Toledo
DB	Tycen Anderson	Toledo
P	Nathan Snyder	Ball State
First Team Specialists
KRS	Justin Hall	Ball State
PRS	Kalil Pimpleton	Central Michigan

Position	Player	Team
Second Team Offense
WR	Konata Mumpfield	Akron
WR	Justin Hall	Ball State
WR	Hassan Beydoun	Eastern Michigan
WR	Trayvon Rudolph	Northern Illinois
OL	Curtis Blackwell	Ball State
OL	Jake Fuzak	Buffalo
OL	Bill Kuduk	Kent State
OL	Nolan Potter	Northern Illinois
OL	Brayden Patton	Northern Illinois
TE	Tristian Brank	Akron
QB	Kaleb Eleby	Western Michigan
RB	Marquez Cooper	Kent State
RB	Sean Tyler	Western Michigan
PK	Chad Ryland	Eastern Michigan
Second Team Defense
DL	Daymond Williams	Buffalo
DL	Lonnie Phelps	Miami
DL	Desjuan Johnson	Toledo
DL	Ralph Holley	Western Michigan
LB	Jaylin Thomas	Ball State
LB	Matthew Salopek	Miami
LB	Jonathan Jones	Toledo
LB	Zaire Barnes	Western Michigan
DB	Jordan Anderson	Bowling Green
DB	Devonni Reed	Central Michigan
DB	Sterling Weatherford	Miami
DB	Dorian Jackson	Western Michigan
P	Jake Julien	Eastern Michigan
Second Team Specialists
KRS	Trayvon Rudolph	Northern Illinois
PRS	Devin Maddox	Toledo

Position	Player	Team
Third Team Offense
WR	Quian Williams	Buffalo
WR	Dallas Dixon	Central Michigan
WR	JaCorey Sullivan	Central Michigan
WR	Mac Hippenhammer	Miami
OL	Jack Klenk	Buffalo
OL	Brian Dooley	Eastern Michigan
OL	Nathan Monnin	Kent State
OL	Logan Zschernitz	Northern Illinois
OL	Vitaliy Gurman	Toledo
TE	Thomas Odukoya	Eastern Michigan
QB	Brett Gabbert	Miami
RB	Dylan McDuffie	Buffalo
RB	Clint Ratkovich	Northern Illinois
PK	Andrew Glass	Kent State
Third Team Defense
DL	Karl Brooks	Bowling Green
DL	Jose Ramirez	Eastern Michigan
DL	Dominique Robinson	Miami
DL	James Ester	Northern Illinois
LB	Lance Deveaux	Northern Illinois
LB	Bryce Houston	Ohio
LB	Dyontae Johnson	Toledo
LB	Corvin Moment	Western Michigan
DB	Devin Tyler	Bowling Green
DB	Jordan Gandy	Northern Illinois
DB	Tariq Drake	Ohio
DB	Maxen Hook	Toledo
P	Matt Naranjo	Bowling Green
Third Team Specialists
KRS	Ron Cook	Buffalo
PRS	Marion Lukes	Central Michigan

=== All-Americans ===
The 2021 College Football All-America Teams are composed of the following College Football All-American first teams chosen by the following selector organizations: Associated Press (AP), Football Writers Association of America (FWAA), American Football Coaches Association (AFCA), Walter Camp Foundation (WCFF), The Sporting News (TSN), Sports Illustrated (SI), USA Today (USAT) ESPN, CBS Sports (CBS), FOX Sports (FOX) College Football News (CFN), Bleacher Report (BR), Scout.com, Phil Steele (PS), SB Nation (SB), Athlon Sports, Pro Football Focus (PFF) and Yahoo! Sports (Yahoo!).

Currently, the NCAA compiles consensus all-America teams in the sports of Division I-FBS football and Division I men's basketball using a point system computed from All-America teams named by coaches associations or media sources. The system consists of three points for a first-team honor, two points for second-team honor, and one point for third-team honor. Honorable mention and fourth team or lower recognitions are not accorded any points. Football consensus teams are compiled by position and the player accumulating the most points at each position is named first team consensus all-American. Currently, the NCAA recognizes All-Americans selected by the AP, AFCA, FWAA, TSN, and the WCFF to determine Consensus and Unanimous All-Americans. Any player named to the First Team by all five of the NCAA-recognized selectors is deemed a Unanimous All-American.

Position	Player	School	Selector	Unanimous	Consensus
First Team All-Americans
K	Nate Needham	Bowling Green	FWAA		

Position	Player	School	Selector	Unanimous	Consensus
Second Team All-Americans
OL	Bernhard Raimann	Central Michigan	TSN		

== NFL draft ==
The following list includes all MAC players who were drafted in the 2022 NFL draft.

Player	Position	School	Draft Round	Round Pick	Overall Pick	Team
Skyy Moore	WR	Western Michigan	2	22	54	Kansas City Chiefs
Luke Goedeke	T	Central Michigan	2	25	57	Tampa Bay Buccaneers
Bernhard Raimann	T	Central Michigan	3	13	77	Indianapolis Colts
Tycen Anderson	S	Toledo	5	23	166	Cincinnati Bengals
Samuel Womack	CB	Toledo	5	29	172	San Francisco 49ers
Dominique Robinson	DE	Miami (OH)	5	31	174	Chicago Bears
