= 2021 Miami RedHawks football team =

American college football season

2021 Miami RedHawks football

Frisco Football Classic champion

Frisco Football Classic, W 27–14 vs. North Texas
- Conference: Mid-American Conference
- East Division
- Record: 7–6 (5–3 MAC)
- Head coach: Chuck Martin (8th season)
- Offensive coordinator: Eric Koehler (8th season)
- Offensive scheme: Multiple
- Co-defensive coordinators: John Hauser (6th season); Spence Nowinsky (4th season)
- Base defense: 4–3
- Home stadium: Yager Stadium

2021 Mid-American Conference football standings
	Conf.			Overall
Team	W		L	W		L
East Division
Kent State xy	6	–	2	7	–	7
Miami (OH)	5	–	3	7	–	6
Ohio	3	–	5	3	–	9
Bowling Green	2	–	6	4	–	8
Buffalo	2	–	6	4	–	8
Akron	1	–	7	2	–	10
West Division
Northern Illinois xy$	6	–	2	9	–	5
Central Michigan x	6	–	2	9	–	4
Toledo	5	–	3	7	–	6
Ball State	4	–	4	6	–	7
Eastern Michigan	4	–	4	7	–	6
Western Michigan	4	–	4	8	–	5
Championship: Northern Illinois 41, Kent State 23
$ – Conference champion; x – Division champion/co-champions; y – Championship game participant

The 2021 Miami RedHawks football team represented Miami University in the 2021 NCAA Division I FBS football season. They were led by eighth-year head coach Chuck Martin and played their home games at Yager Stadium in Oxford, Ohio, as members of the East Division of the Mid-American Conference.

== Schedule ==
Date	Time	Opponent	Site	TV	Result	Attendance
September 4	3:30 p.m.	at No. 8 Cincinnati*	Nippert Stadium; Cincinnati, OH (Victory Bell)	ESPN+	L 14–49	37,978
September 11	12:00 p.m.	at Minnesota*	Huntington Bank Stadium; Minneapolis, MN	ESPNU	L 26–31	43,372
September 18	3:30 p.m.	LIU*	Yager Stadium; Oxford, OH	ESPN+	W 42–7	12,036
September 25	12:00 p.m.	at Army*	Michie Stadium; West Point, NY	CBSSN	L 10–23	24,045
October 2	3:30 p.m.	Central Michigan	Yager Stadium; Oxford, OH	ESPN+	W 28–17	15,065
October 9	3:30 p.m.	at Eastern Michigan	Rynearson Stadium; Ypsilanti, MI	ESPN+	L 12–13	15,664
October 16	2:30 p.m.	Akron	Yager Stadium; Oxford, OH	ESPN+	W 34–21	11,042
October 23	3:30 p.m.	at Ball State	Scheumann Stadium; Muncie, IN	ESPN+	W 24–17	15,703
November 2	7:30 p.m.	at Ohio	Peden Stadium; Athens, OH (Battle of the Bricks)	ESPNU	L 33–35	15,940
November 9	7:00 p.m.	Buffalo	Yager Stadium; Oxford, OH	ESPNU	W 45–18	10,069
November 16	8:00 p.m.	Bowling Green	Yager Stadium; Oxford, OH	ESPNU	W 34–7	10,269
November 27	12:00 p.m.	at Kent State	Dix Stadium; Kent, OH	ESPN+	L 47–48 ^{OT}	8,387
December 23	3:30 p.m.	vs. North Texas*	Toyota Stadium; Frisco, TX (Frisco Football Classic)	ESPN	W 27–14	11,721
*Non-conference game; Rankings from AP Poll released prior to the game; All times are in Eastern time

== Preseason ==
=== MAC media day ===
The Mid-American Conference media day was held on July 20, 2021 at Ford Field in Detroit, Michigan. Miami was represented by head coach Chuck Martin, wide receiver Jack Sorenson and defensive back Mike Brown. The RedHawks were predicted to finish in third place in the East Division in the Mid-American preseason poll.

== Game summaries ==
=== At No. 8 Cincinnati ===
	1	2	3	4	Total
RedHawks	0	0	0	14	14
No. 8 Bearcats	21	14	0	14	49

Statistics	MIA	CIN
First downs	17	27
Total yards	278	542
Rushing yards	169	247
Passing yards	109	295
Turnovers	0	3
Time of possession	34:15	25:45

Team	Category	Player	Statistics
Miami	Passing	A. J. Mayer	9/28, 109 yards
Miami	Rushing	Keyon Mozee	15 rushes, 80 yards
Miami	Receiving	Mac Hippenhammer	3 receptions, 64 yards
Cincinnati	Passing	Desmond Ridder	20/25, 295 yards, 4 TD, INT
Cincinnati	Rushing	Jerome Ford	12 rushes, 121 yards, TD
Cincinnati	Receiving	Tyler Scott	1 reception, 81 yards, TD

=== At Minnesota ===
	1	2	3	4	Total
RedHawks	0	3	10	13	26
Golden Gophers	7	14	0	10	31

Statistics	MIA	MINN
First downs	20	19
Total yards	341	287
Rushing yards	104	175
Passing yards	237	112
Turnovers	2	0
Time of possession	27:24	32:36

Team	Category	Player	Statistics
Miami	Passing	Brett Gabbert	14/29, 201 yards, 2 TD, INT
Miami	Rushing	Brett Gabbert	6 rushes, 27 yards
Miami	Receiving	Jack Sorenson	6 receptions, 97 yards, TD
Minnesota	Passing	Tanner Morgan	8/17, 112 yards, 2 TD
Minnesota	Rushing	Trey Potts	34 rushes, 178 yards, 2 TD
Minnesota	Receiving	Dylan Wright	3 receptions, 73 yards, TD

=== LIU ===
	1	2	3	4	Total
Sharks	0	7	0	0	7
RedHawks	7	14	14	7	42

Statistics	LIU	MIA
First downs	13	27
Total yards	215	523
Rushing yards	37	229
Passing yards	178	294
Turnovers	0	1
Time of possession	35:20	24:40

Team	Category	Player	Statistics
LIU	Passing	Camden Orth	15/21, 178 yards, TD
LIU	Rushing	Jonathan DeBique	10 rushes, 31 yards
LIU	Receiving	Tosin Oyekanmi	3 receptions, 67 yards
Miami	Passing	Brett Gabbert	10/16, 171 yards, 2 TD, INT
Miami	Rushing	David Afari	5 rushes, 78 yards
Miami	Receiving	Jack Sorenson	5 receptions, 86 yards, TD

=== At Army ===
	1	2	3	4	Total
RedHawks	0	3	0	7	10
Black Knights	7	10	0	6	23

Statistics	MIA	ARMY
First downs	13	16
Total yards	232	384
Rushing yards	28	384
Passing yards	204	0
Turnovers	1	0
Time of possession	20:24	39:36

Team	Category	Player	Statistics
Miami	Passing	Brett Gabbert	11/25, 193 yards, TD
Miami	Rushing	Keyon Mozee	5 rushes, 11 yards
Miami	Receiving	Kevin Davis	2 receptions, 93 yards, TD
Army	Passing	Christian Anderson	0/5, 0 yards
Army	Rushing	Christian Anderson	15 rushes, 236 yards, 2 TD
Army	Receiving	None	

=== Central Michigan ===
	1	2	3	4	Total
Chippewas	0	7	3	7	17
RedHawks	14	0	0	14	28

Statistics	CMU	MIA
First downs	25	26
Total yards	430	514
Rushing yards	52	164
Passing yards	378	350
Turnovers	0	1
Time of possession	26:45	33:15

Team	Category	Player	Statistics
Central Michigan	Passing	Daniel Richardson	22/41, 326 yards, 2 TD
Central Michigan	Rushing	Myles Bailey	8 rushes, 29 yards
Central Michigan	Receiving	Dallas Dixon	7 receptions, 113 yards, TD
Miami	Passing	A. J. Mayer	13/18, 179 yards, 2 TD, INT
Miami	Rushing	Keyon Mozee	13 rushes, 83 yards
Miami	Receiving	Mac Hippenhammer	8 receptions, 170 yards

=== At Eastern Michigan ===
	1	2	3	4	Total
RedHawks	6	0	3	3	12
Eagles	0	10	3	0	13

Statistics	MIA	EMU
First downs	19	16
Total yards	385	257
Rushing yards	126	31
Passing yards	259	206
Turnovers	1	1
Time of possession	25:52	34:08

Team	Category	Player	Statistics
Miami	Passing	A. J. Mayer	16/39, 259 yards
Miami	Rushing	Tyre Shelton	9 rushes, 41 yards
Miami	Receiving	Jack Sorenson	7 receptions, 123 yards
Eastern Michigan	Passing	Ben Bryant	21/31, 206 yards, TD, INT
Eastern Michigan	Rushing	Darius Boone Jr.	9 rushes, 36 yards
Eastern Michigan	Receiving	Dylan Drummond	7 receptions, 93 yards

=== Akron ===
	1	2	3	4	Total
Zips	0	7	0	14	21
RedHawks	14	7	13	0	34

Statistics	AKR	MIA
First downs	21	22
Total yards	356	474
Rushing yards	65	245
Passing yards	291	229
Turnovers	1	1
Time of possession	29:07	30:53

Team	Category	Player	Statistics
Akron	Passing	Zach Gibson	25/39, 291 yards, 3 TD
Akron	Rushing	Blake Hester	10 rushes, 29 yards
Akron	Receiving	Konata Mumpfield	10 receptions, 109 yards
Miami	Passing	A. J. Mayer	19/27, 229 yards, 3 TD
Miami	Rushing	Keyon Mozee	8 rushes, 73 yards, TD
Miami	Receiving	Jack Sorenson	5 receptions, 113 yards, TD

=== At Ball State ===
	1	2	3	4	Total
RedHawks	10	6	0	8	24
Cardinals	7	3	7	0	17

Statistics	MIA	BALL
First downs	18	20
Total yards	360	327
Rushing yards	126	100
Passing yards	234	227
Turnovers	0	2
Time of possession	34:32	25:28

Team	Category	Player	Statistics
Miami	Passing	Brett Gabbert	20/24, 207 yards, 2 TD
Miami	Rushing	Tyre Shelton	14 rushes, 46 yards
Miami	Receiving	Jack Sorenson	8 receptions, 138 yards
Ball State	Passing	Drew Plitt	22/34, 227 yards, 2 TD, INT
Ball State	Rushing	Carson Steele	11 rushes, 49 yards
Ball State	Receiving	Jayshon Jackson	8 receptions, 121 yards, TD

=== At Ohio ===
	1	2	3	4	Total
RedHawks	0	0	13	20	33
Bobcats	7	7	14	7	35

Statistics	MIA	OHIO
First downs	24	19
Total yards	569	413
Rushing yards	77	124
Passing yards	492	289
Turnovers	1	1
Time of possession	27:38	32:22

Team	Category	Player	Statistics
Miami	Passing	Brett Gabbert	32/55, 492 yards, 5 TD, INT
Miami	Rushing	Brett Gabbert	7 rushes, 23 yards
Miami	Receiving	Jack Sorenson	14 receptions, 283 yards, 2 TD
Ohio	Passing	Kurtis Rourke	23/32, 289 yards, 3 TD
Ohio	Rushing	De'Montre Tuggle	11 rushes, 68 yards, 2 TD
Ohio	Receiving	Isiah Cox	6 receptions, 106 yards, 2 TD

=== Buffalo ===
	1	2	3	4	Total
Bulls	7	3	0	8	18
RedHawks	10	14	14	7	45

Statistics	BUF	MIA
First downs	21	25
Total yards	361	536
Rushing yards	119	185
Passing yards	242	351
Turnovers	4	1
Time of possession	28:32	31:28

Team	Category	Player	Statistics
Buffalo	Passing	Kyle Vantrease	11/20, 151 yards, INT
Buffalo	Rushing	Dylan McDuffie	20 rushes, 91 yards, TD
Buffalo	Receiving	Quian Williams	9 receptions, 104 yards, TD
Miami	Passing	Brett Gabbert	21/28, 351 yards, 4 TD
Miami	Rushing	Keyon Mozee	15 rushes, 67 yards, TD
Miami	Receiving	Jalen Walker	7 receptions, 136 yards, TD

=== Bowling Green ===
	1	2	3	4	Total
Falcons	7	0	0	0	7
RedHawks	6	14	14	0	34

Statistics	BGSU	MIA
First downs	12	11
Total yards	258	346
Rushing yards	150	119
Passing yards	108	227
Turnovers	1	1
Time of possession	30:43	29:17

Team	Category	Player	Statistics
Bowling Green	Passing	Matt McDonald	13/28, 108 yards
Bowling Green	Rushing	Nick Mosley	15 rushes, 94 yards
Bowling Green	Receiving	Tyrone Broden	5 receptions, 53 yards
Miami	Passing	Brett Gabbert	10/20, 227 yards, 2 TD, INT
Miami	Rushing	Tyre Shelton	9 rushes, 56 yards, 2 TD
Miami	Receiving	Jack Sorenson	4 receptions, 111 yards, TD

=== At Kent State ===
	1	2	3	4	OT	Total
RedHawks	6	10	7	18	6	47
Golden Flashes	7	10	14	10	7	48

Statistics	MIA	KENT
First downs	31	32
Total yards	549	642
Rushing yards	144	303
Passing yards	405	339
Turnovers	2	2
Time of possession	28:58	31:02

Team	Category	Player	Statistics
Miami	Passing	Brett Gabbert	26/51, 405 yards, 4 TD, 2 INT
Miami	Rushing	Kevin Davis	10 rushes, 56 yards
Miami	Receiving	Kenny Tracy	5 receptions, 104 yards, TD
Kent State	Passing	Dustin Crum	24/33, 325 yards, 2 TD, 2 INT
Kent State	Rushing	Xavier Williams	13 rushes, 168 yards, 2 TD
Kent State	Receiving	Keshunn Abram	7 receptions, 138 yards, TD

=== Vs. North Texas—Frisco Football Classic ===
	1	2	3	4	Total
Mean Green	7	7	0	0	14
RedHawks	10	10	7	0	27

Statistics	UNT	MIA
First downs	18	26
Total yards	317	431
Rushing yards	89	203
Passing yards	228	228
Turnovers	2	0
Time of possession	21:39	38:21

Team	Category	Player	Statistics
North Texas	Passing	Austin Aune	15/32, 228 yards, 2 INT
North Texas	Rushing	Austin Aune	9 rushes, 28 yards, TD
North Texas	Receiving	Roderic Burns	4 receptions, 87 yards
Miami	Passing	Brett Gabbert	22/31, 228 yards, 2 TD
Miami	Rushing	Kenny Tracy	14 rushes, 92 yards, TD
Miami	Receiving	Jack Sorenson	7 receptions, 116 yards

== Personnel ==
2021 Miami RedHawks football team roster
Players
Coaches
Offense

Pos.	#	Name	Class
RB	11	David Afari	Fr
OL	63	Evan Azzara	Fr
WR	18	Jeremiah Batiste	Fr
WR	81	James Besett	Fr
RB	1	Jaylon Bester	Fr
OL	59	Kolby Borders	Fr
QB	17	Alec Bornhorst	So
WR	19	James Burns	So
WR	83	Angelo Butts	Fr
OL	69	Brody Carper	So
WR	34	Chris Cavalaris	So
OL	57	Bennett Clark	So
TE	89	Jack Coldiron	Fr
OL	78	Dominic Collado	Fr
RB	26	Kevin Davis	Fr
TE	80	Jack DeJarld	Fr
WR	25	Devon Dorsey	Fr
QB	16	Orin Edwards	Fr
OL	60	Rusty Feth	So
QB	5	Brett Gabbert	So
QB	12	Henry Hesson	Fr
WR	8	Mac Hippenhammer	Jr
OL	56	Reid Holskey	Fr
TE	46	Andrew Homer	Sr
WR	36	Jackson Izzard	Fr
OL	72	Ben Jackson	Fr
OL	70	Will Jados	Fr
OL	66	Luke Kirin	Fr
QB	10	A. J. Mayer	So
RB	28	Keyon Mozee	Fr
TE	88	Nate Muersch	Fr
OL	77	Charlie Nank	Fr
OL	65	Pete Nank	Jr
TE	37	Scott Nieman	Fr
OL	61	Ryan O'Hair	Fr
TE	87	Ryan Orput	Fr
TE	84	Derek Paulson	Sr
WR	85	Matthew Reardon	Fr
OL	64	David Redding	Jr
WR	6	Austin Robinson	So
OL	53	Caleb Shaffer	So
TE	86	Brian Shane	Fr
RB	9	Tyre Shelton	Fr
OL	79	Caleb Siech	Fr
QB	2	Aveon Smith	Fr
QB	15	Kamell Smith	Fr
RB	24	Darez Sanders	Fr
WR	13	Jack Sorenson	Sr
QB	4	Ben Tarpey	Fr
OL	55	Andrew Todd	So
RB	33	Kenny Tracy	Fr
WR	21	Harrison Truitt	Fr
TE	43	Haakon Van Beyen	Fr
OL	50	Sam Vaughn	Fr
WR	14	Jalen Walker	Jr
WR	22	Jace Williams	Fr
TE	44	Rhett Williams	Fr

Defense

Pos.	#	Name	Class
DB	16	Eli Blakey	Fr
LB	8	Luke Bolden	So
DB	10	Trevon Booker	Fr
LB	58	Jackson Boras	Fr
DB	18	Cedric Boswell	Sr
DB	3	Mike Brown	Sr
DL	93	Kyle Bryant	Fr
DL	82	Kameron Butler	Jr
DB	19	Ambe' Caldwell	Fr
DB	13	Brett Coleman	Fr
DL	99	Anthony Collier	Fr
LB	39	Carson Daniels	Fr
DL	91	Marlon Dawson Jr.	Fr
DL	92	Austin Ertl	So
DL	94	Terran Hearn	Fr
DL	96	Kobe Hilton	Fr
LB	12	Corban Hondru	Fr
DB	29	Ryan Kahn	Fr
DL	95	Ben Kimpler	Sr
DB	22	Ja'Von Kimpson	Fr
DB	31	Cam Kirk	Fr
LB	9	Daylan Long	Fr
DL	30	Josh Maize	Jr
LB	23	Austin McWood	Fr
LB	35	Ryan McWood	Sr
DB	20	Mehki Miller	Fr
DB	1	Jaymar Mundy	Fr
LB	33	Dominic Nardone	Fr
DL	48	Ryan Newton	Jr
DL	37	Dalton Norris	Fr
LB	0	Ivan Pace Jr.	So
DL	47	Lonnie Phelps	So
DB	27	Dee Pierce	Fr
LB	54	Blaine Riley	Fr
DL	11	Dominique Robinson	Sr
LB	4	Camden Rogers	Fr
DB	24	Ja'Don Rucker-Furlow	Jr
DB	17	T. J. Rush	Fr
DB	15	Matthew Salopek	Fr
DB	5	John Saunders Jr.	Fr
LB	26	Jackson Schott	Fr
DB	2	Cecil Singleton	So
DL	49	Jacob Snell	Fr
DB	28	Caleb Tubbs	Fr
DB	36	Silas Walters	Fr
DL	34	C. J. Ware IV	Fr
LB	32	Ed Warriner	Fr
DB	6	Jacquez Warren	So
DL	51	Nasir Washington	Fr
DB	21	Sterling Weatherford	Sr
DL	90	Caiden Woullard	Fr

Special teams

Pos.	#	Name	Class
LS	97	Brendan Beattie	Fr
K	38	Henry Beckett	Fr
K, P	35	Alec Bevelhimer	Fr
K, P	31	Dom Dzioban	Fr
K	98	Graham Nicholson	Fr
LS	45	Nick Walker	Fr

Head coach

- Chuck Martin

Coordinators/assistant coaches

- Erik Koehler
  Co-offensive coordinator/quarterbacks
- Spence Nowinsky
  Co-defensive coordinator/linebackers
- John Hauser
  Co-defensive coordinator/Cornerbacks
- James Patton
  Offensive line/Run game coordinator
- Doug Shearer
  Special teams coordinator
- Bill Brechin
  Safeties
- Lamar Conrad
  Running backs
- Pat Welsh
  Tight ends/recruiting coordinator
- E. J. Whitlow
  Defensive line
- Israel Wollfork
  Wide receivers

Legend

- (C) Team captain
- (S) Suspended
- (I) Ineligible
- Injured
- Redshirt

Roster
Last update: December 13, 2021
