= Neil Farrell =

American football player (born 1998)

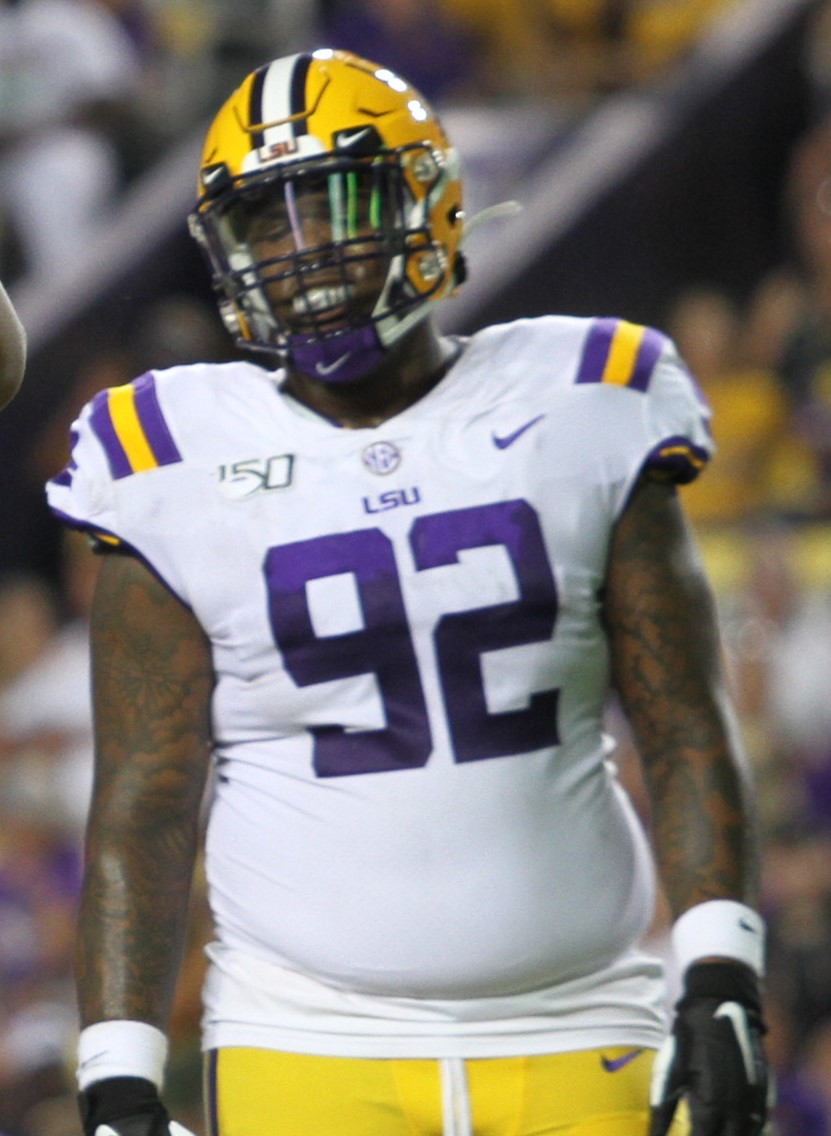
- Farrell with the LSU Tigers in 2019

No. 92 – St. Louis Battlehawks
- Position: Nose tackle
- Roster status: Active

Personal information
- Born: September 9, 1998 (age 28); Mobile, Alabama, U.S.
- Listed height: 6 ft 4 in (1.93 m)
- Listed weight: 330 lb (150 kg)

Career information
- High school: Murphy (Mobile)
- College: LSU (2017–2021)
- NFL draft: 2022: 4th round, 126th overall pick

Career history
- Las Vegas Raiders (2022); Kansas City Chiefs (2023); Miami Dolphins (2024); St. Louis Battlehawks (2026–present)

Awards and highlights
- Super Bowl champion (LVIII); CFP national champion (2019); Second-team All-SEC (2021)

Career NFL statistics
- Total tackles: 15
- Pass deflections: 1
- Stats at Pro Football Reference

Neil Farrell Jr. (born September 9, 1998) is an American professional football nose tackle for the St. Louis Battlehawks of the United Football League (UFL). He played college football for the LSU Tigers and was selected by the Las Vegas Raiders in the fourth round of the 2022 NFL draft.

== Early life ==
Farrell grew up in Mobile, Alabama, and attended Murphy High School. As a senior, Farrell recorded 101 tackles, 28 for a loss, 13 sacks, and 14 quarterback hurries. Farrell was rated a four-star recruit and committed to play college football at LSU over offers from Michigan, Alabama, Florida, USC, and South Carolina and signed with the team despite a late recruiting push by Florida State.

== College career ==
Farrell played in the first five games of his freshman season and recorded five tackles with one quarterback hurry before suffering an injury. Farrell played in all 15 of LSU's games with three starts as a sophomore and had 46 tackles, seven tackles for loss, and three sacks as the Tigers won the 2020 College Football Playoff National Championship.

Farrell initially announced that he would opt-out of his senior season due to family health concerns regarding the COVID-19 pandemic, but later reversed his decision. Farrell finished the season with 25 tackles, 2.5 tackles for loss, 1.0 sacks, and 1 forced fumble. After considering entering the 2021 NFL draft, he decided to utilize the extra year of eligibility granted to college athletes who played in the 2020 season due to the coronavirus pandemic and return to LSU for a fifth season. Farrell finished the 2021 season with 45 tackles, 9.5 tackles for loss, and two sacks. After the conclusion of his college career, he played in the 2022 Senior Bowl and was named the best defensive lineman for the American Team.

== Professional career ==
Pre-draft measurables
Height	Weight	Arm length	Hand span	Wingspan	40-yard dash	10-yard split	20-yard split	20-yard shuttle	Three-cone drill	Vertical jump	Bench press
6 ft 4 1/8 in (1.93 m)	330 lb (150 kg)	32 1/4 in (0.82 m)	10 1/8 in (0.26 m)	6 ft 5 3/8 in (1.97 m)	5.40 s	1.86 s	3.01 s	5.05 s	8.41 s	21.5 in (0.55 m)	18 reps
All values from NFL Combine/Pro Day

=== Las Vegas Raiders ===
Farrell was selected by the Las Vegas Raiders in the fourth round, 126th overall, of the 2022 NFL draft. He was placed on the non-football injury list on July 26, 2023.

=== Kansas City Chiefs ===
On August 29, 2023, Farrell was traded to the Kansas City Chiefs in exchange for sixth-round selection in the 2024 NFL draft. Farrell reached Super Bowl LVIII where the Chiefs defeated the San Francisco 49ers 25-22 in Super Bowl LVIII. Farrell recorded 1 tackle and 1 pass defensed in the Super Bowl.

Farrell was waived by the Chiefs on August 27, 2024, and re-signed to the practice squad, but released two days later.

=== Miami Dolphins ===
On September 26, 2024, Farrell signed with the Miami Dolphins practice squad. He was promoted to the active roster on November 11. He signed a reserve/future contract on January 7, 2025.

On May 8, 2025, Farrell was waived by the Dolphins.

=== St. Louis Battlehawks ===
On January 14, 2026, Farrell was selected by the St. Louis Battlehawks of the United Football League (UFL).
