= Brett Gabbert =

American football player (born 2000)

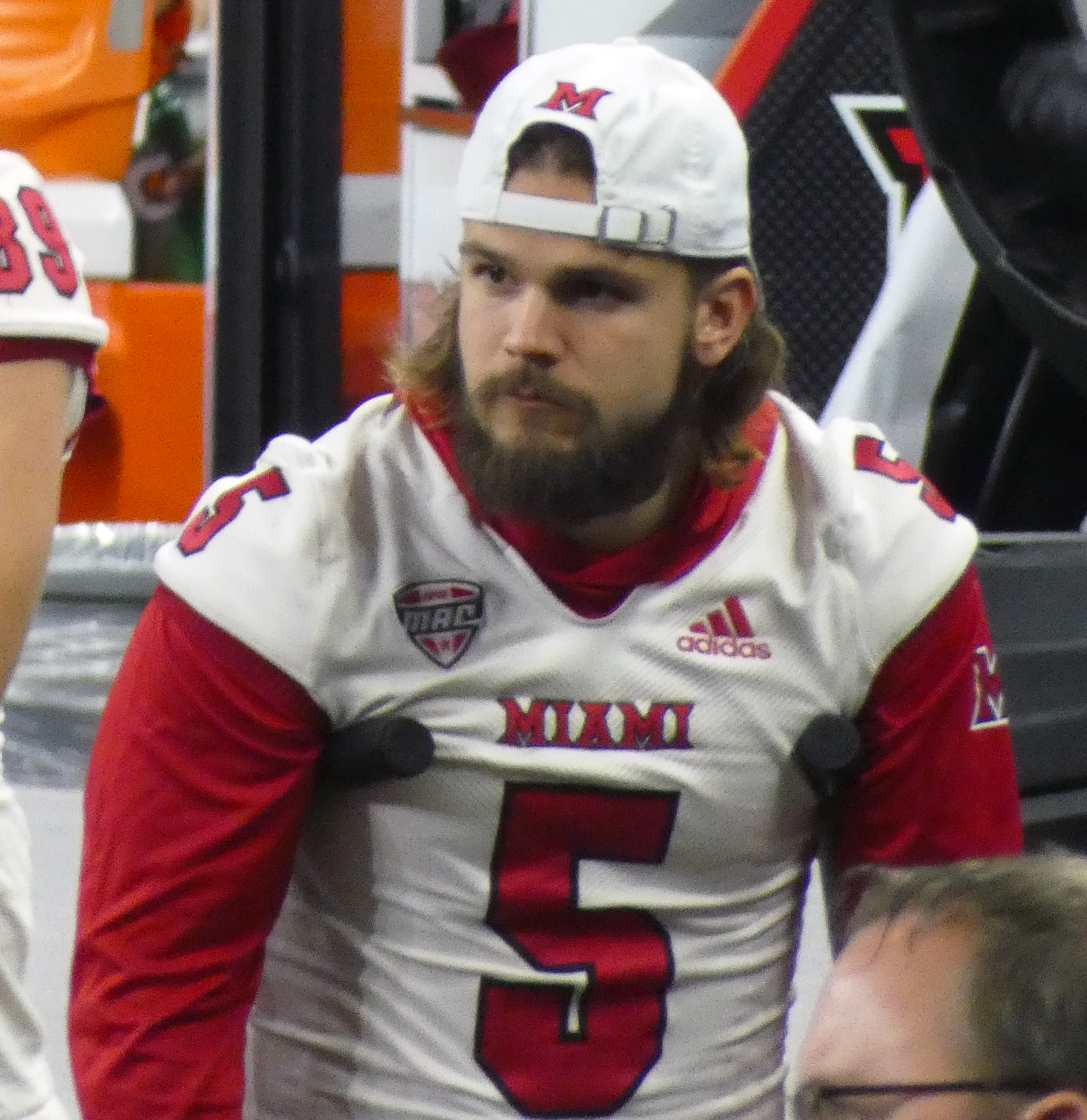
- Gabbert with Miami (OH) in 2023

Profile
- Position: Quarterback

Personal information
- Born: August 4, 2000 (age 26); St. Louis, Missouri, U.S.
- Listed height: 6 ft 0 in (1.83 m)
- Listed weight: 206 lb (93 kg)

Career information
- High school: Christian Brothers College (Town and Country, Missouri)
- College: Miami (OH) (2019–2024)
- NFL draft: 2025: undrafted

Career history
- Miami Dolphins (2025)*
- * Offseason or practice squad member only

Awards and highlights
- First-team All-MAC (2024); 2× Third-team All-MAC (2021, 2023); Frisco Football Classic Offensive MVP (2021); MAC Freshman of the Year (2019)

Brett Gabbert (born August 4, 2000) is an American former professional football quarterback. He played college football for the Miami RedHawks.

== Early life ==
Gabbert attended Christian Brothers College High School where he led them to the 2018 MSHSAA Class 6 state championship. He committed to play college football at Miami University.

== College career ==
As a freshman, Gabbert earned the RedHawks' starting quarterback role ahead of their season opener versus Iowa, becoming the first true freshman in school history to do so. In his first start he completed 17 of 27 passes for 186 yards and two touchdowns with an interception in a 38–14 loss to Iowa. In week 11, Gabbert went nine for 15 passing for 225 yards and three touchdowns with an interception in a 44–3 rout of Bowling Green. On the season, he completed 175 of 316 passes for 2,411 yards, 11 touchdowns, and eight interceptions, and rushed for 72 yards and three touchdowns. Gabbert was named the MAC freshman of the year.

In week 4 of the 2020 season, Gabbert threw for a career-high 308 yards and four touchdowns in a 38–7 win over Akron. He finished the COVID-shortened season completing 23 of 35 pass attempts for 384 yards and four touchdowns, while also rushing for 58 yards and forcing a fumble. In week 9 of the 2021 season, Gabbert threw for 492 yards and five touchdowns with one interception in a 35–33 loss to Ohio. In the 2021 Frisco Football Classic, he completed 22 of 31 passes for 228 yards and two touchdowns in a win over North Texas, earning game offensive MVP honors. In the 2021 season Gabbert completed 178 of 299 passes for 2,648 yards, and 26 touchdowns, to just six interceptions, and rushed for 147 yards and a touchdown. For his performance on the season, Gabbert was named third team All-MAC.

Gabbert was named to multiple award watchlists for the 2022 season, namely for the Manning Award, the Davey O'Brien Award, and the Walter Camp Award. In week 11, he completed 20 of 26 passes for 244 yards and three touchdowns in a 37–21 loss to Ohio. In the 2022 season Gabbert only played four games due to a non-throwing shoulder injury, completing 74 of 115 passes for 816 yards and four touchdowns with no interceptions and rushing for 55 yards and a touchdown.

In week 3 of the 2023 season, Gabbert completed 12 of 20 pass attempts for 237 yards and three touchdowns, with an interceptions, while also leading the team in rushing yards with 75, as he helped Miami upset Cincinnati 31–24 in overtime. On October 21 in a week 8 game against Toledo he suffered a season-ending leg injury.

In week 12 of the 2024 season, Gabbert surpassed 10,000 career passing yards in a victory over Kent State.

=== Statistics ===
Year	Team	Games			Passing								Rushing			
Year	Team	GP	GS	Record	Cmp	Att	Pct	Yds	Avg	TD	Int	Rtg	Att	Yds	Avg	TD
2019	Miami	14	14	8−6	175	316	55.4	2,411	7.6	11	8	125.9	88	72	0.8	3
2020	Miami	2	2	2−0	23	35	65.7	384	11.0	4	0	195.6	7	58	8.3	0
2021	Miami	10	10	6−4	178	299	59.5	2,648	8.9	26	6	158.6	56	151	2.7	1
2022	Miami	4	4	1−3	74	115	64.3	816	7.1	4	0	135.4	39	55	1.4	1
2023	Miami	8	8	6−2	111	187	59.4	1,634	8.7	14	5	152.1	49	140	2.9	2
2024	Miami	14	14	9−5	217	379	57.3	2,921	7.7	21	11	134.5	55	6	0.1	1
Career		52	52	32−20	778	1,331	58.5	10,814	8.1	80	30	142.0	294	482	1.6	8

== Professional career ==
Pre-draft measurables
Height	Weight	Arm length	Hand span	40-yard dash	10-yard split	20-yard split	20-yard shuttle	Vertical jump	Broad jump
5 ft 11 1/2 in (1.82 m)	200 lb (91 kg)	29 in (0.74 m)	9 in (0.23 m)	4.79 s	1.69 s	2.74 s	4.42 s	29.5 in (0.75 m)	9 ft 4 in (2.84 m)
All values from Pro Day

On April 27, 2025, Gabbert was invited to the Miami Dolphins' rookie mini camp. He signed with the Dolphins as an undrafted free agent on May 22. He was waived on July 22. Gabbert was re-signed on August 1, but waived two days later.

== Personal life ==
Gabbert is the brother of NFL quarterback Blaine Gabbert. His brother, Tyler also played college football.
