= Desjuan Johnson =

American football player (born 1999)

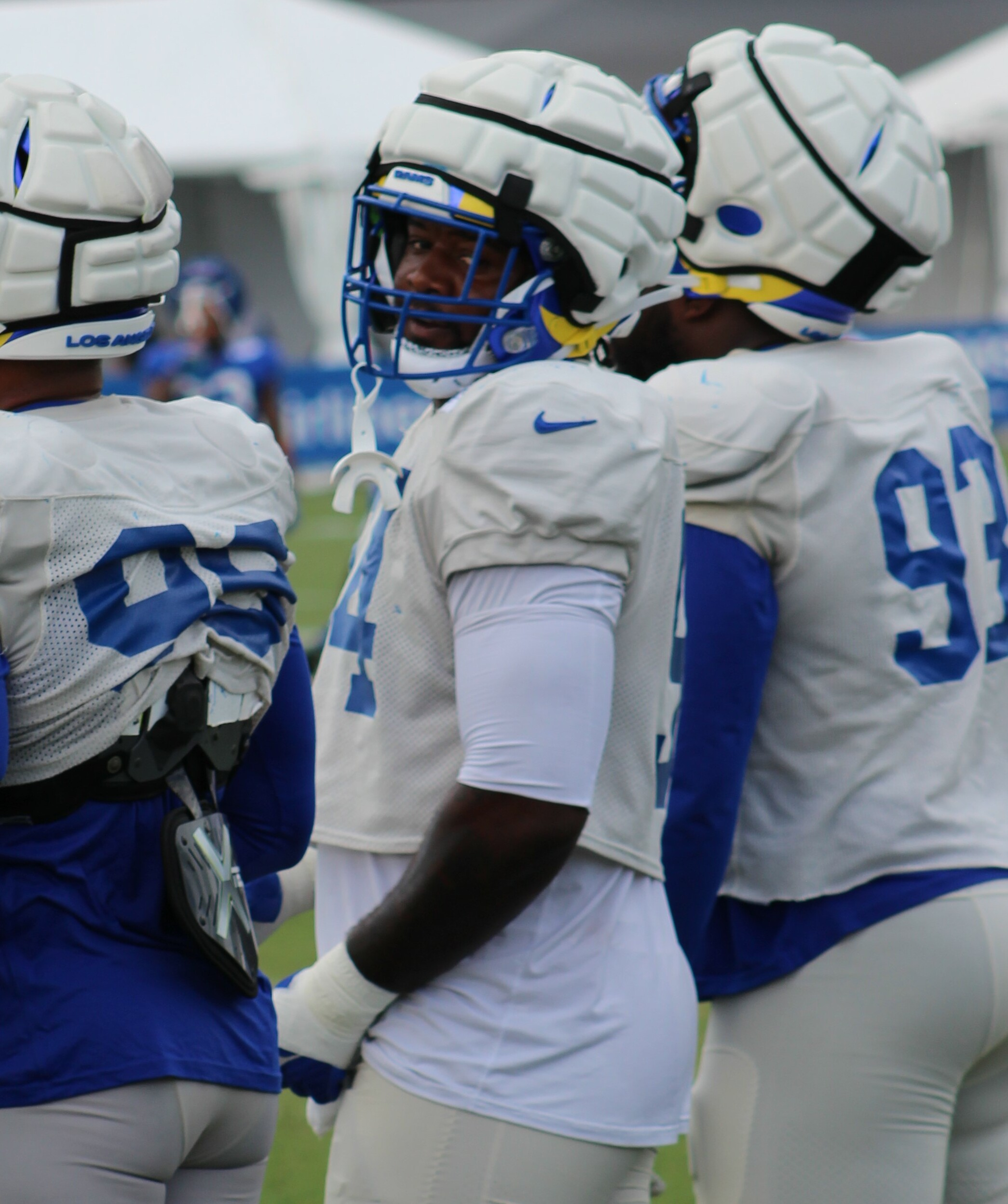
- Johnson with the Los Angeles Rams in 2023

No. 94 – Los Angeles Rams
- Position: Outside linebacker
- Roster status: Active

Personal information
- Born: September 3, 1999 (age 27); Detroit, Michigan, U.S.
- Listed height: 6 ft 3 in (1.91 m)
- Listed weight: 278 lb (126 kg)

Career information
- High school: East English Village Prep (Detroit)
- College: Toledo (2018–2022)
- NFL draft: 2023: 7th round, 259th overall pick

Career history
- Los Angeles Rams (2023–present)

Awards and highlights
- First-team All-MAC (2022); 2× Second-team All-MAC (2020, 2021)

Career NFL statistics as of Week 7, 2026
- Total tackles: 42
- Sacks: 5
- Forced fumbles: 1
- Stats at Pro Football Reference

Desjuan Renarl Johnson (dezz-WAHN; born September 3, 1999) is an American professional football outside linebacker for the Los Angeles Rams of the National Football League (NFL). He played college football for the Toledo Rockets where he was a three-time All-MAC selection. He was Mr. Irrelevant of the 2023 NFL draft, selected by the Rams.

== College career ==
Desjuan Johnson played for the Toledo Rockets. He was a Second-Team All-Mid-American Conference (MAC) defensive end in years 2020 and 2021, and a First-team All-MAC defensive end in 2022 when he also won the MAC championship.

== Professional career ==
Pre-draft measurables
Height	Weight	Arm length	Hand span	Wingspan	40-yard dash	10-yard split	20-yard split	20-yard shuttle	Three-cone drill	Vertical jump	Broad jump	Bench press
6 ft 2 1/8 in (1.88 m)	285 lb (129 kg)	31 3/4 in (0.81 m)	9 3/4 in (0.25 m)	6 ft 6 3/8 in (1.99 m)	5.04 s	1.70 s	2.90 s	4.50 s	8.03 s	29.0 in (0.74 m)	9 ft 0 in (2.74 m)	24 reps
All values from Pro Day

Johnson was drafted by the Los Angeles Rams in the seventh round, with the 259th overall pick, of the 2023 NFL draft. He was the final pick of the draft, making him 2023's Mr. Irrelevant. As a rookie, he appeared in 11 games in the 2023 season. He finished with two sacks, nine total tackles, and one forced fumble.

== NFL career statistics ==
Legend
**Bold**	Career high

=== Regular season ===
Year	Team	Games		Tackles					Interceptions						Fumbles				
Year	Team	GP	GS	Cmb	Solo	Ast	Sck	TFL	Int	Yds	Avg	Lng	TD	PD	FF	Fum	FR	Yds	TD
2023	LAR	**11**	0	9	**5**	4	**2.0**	**2**	0	0	0.0	0	0	0	**1**	0	0	0	0
2024	LAR	10	0	**12**	4	**8**	1.0	1	0	0	0.0	0	0	0	0	0	0	0	0
2025	LAR	6	0	**12**	4	**8**	**2.0**	**2**	0	0	0.0	0	0	0	0	0	0	0	0
2026	LAR	7	0	9	0	9	0.0	0	0	0	0.0	0	0	0	0	0	0	0	0
Career		34	0	42	13	29	5.0	5	0	0	0.0	0	0	0	1	0	0	0	0

=== Postseason ===
Year	Team	Games		Tackles					Interceptions						Fumbles				
Year	Team	GP	GS	Cmb	Solo	Ast	Sck	TFL	Int	Yds	Avg	Lng	TD	PD	FF	Fum	FR	Yds	TD
2023	LAR	1	0	0	0	0	0.0	0	0	0	0.0	0	0	0	0	0	0	0	0
2024	LAR	2	0	2	**1**	1	**1.0**	**1**	0	0	0.0	0	0	0	0	0	0	0	0
2025	LAR	**3**	0	**5**	0	**5**	0.0	0	0	0	0.0	0	0	0	0	0	0	0	0
Career		6	0	7	1	6	1.0	1	0	0	0.0	0	0	0	0	0	0	0	0
