= Ali Fayad (gridiron football) =

American gridiron football player (born 1999)

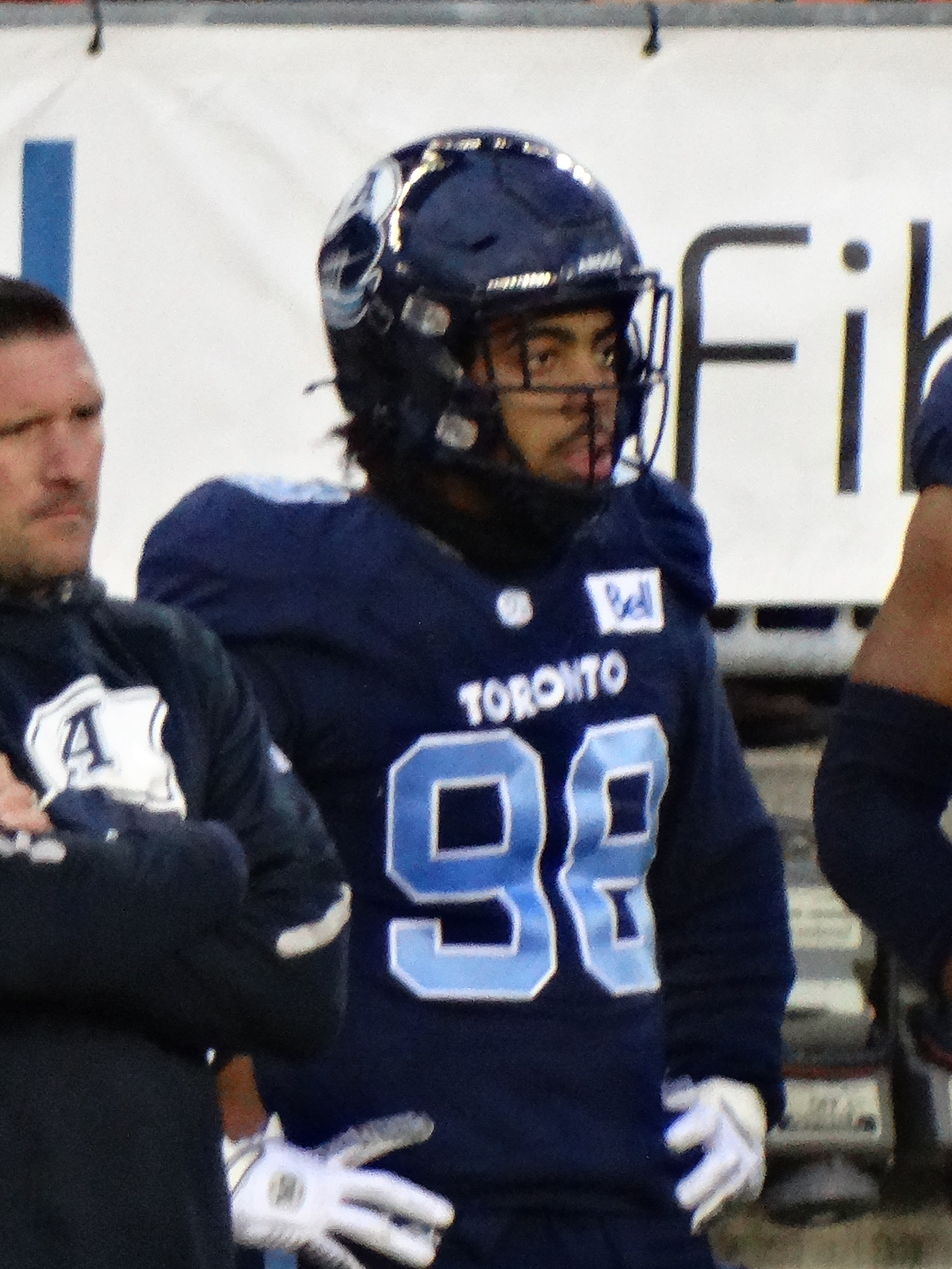
- Fayad with the Toronto Argonauts in 2022

No. 76 – Toronto Argonauts
- Position: Defensive end
- Roster status: Practice
- CFL status: American

Personal information
- Born: May 12, 1999 (age 27); Dearborn, Michigan, U.S.
- Listed height: 6 ft 2 in (1.88 m)
- Listed weight: 250 lb (113 kg)

Career information
- High school: Dearborn (MI)
- College: Western Michigan
- NFL draft: 2022: undrafted

Career history
- Philadelphia Eagles (2022)*; Toronto Argonauts (2022); Philadelphia Stars (2023); Winnipeg Blue Bombers (2024); Edmonton Elks (2025)*; Toronto Argonauts (2026–present)
- * Offseason or practice squad member only

Awards and highlights
- Grey Cup champion (2022); MAC Defensive Player of the Year (2021); First-team All-MAC (2021)
- Stats at Pro Football Reference
- Stats at CFL.ca

Ali Fayad (born May 12, 1999) is an American professional football defensive end for the Toronto Argonauts of the Canadian Football League (CFL). He played college football at Western Michigan and was signed by the Philadelphia Eagles as an undrafted free agent in 2022. He also played for the Winnipeg Blue Bombers of the CFL, and the Philadelphia Stars of the United States Football League (USFL).

== Early life and college ==
Fayad was born on May 12, 1999, in Dearborn, Michigan. He is Lebanese. Fayad attended Dearborn High School, where as a senior he made 60 tackles and 17 sacks, earning Detroit Free Press first-team all-state and Detroit News all-metro honors.

Fayad initially committed to Eastern Michigan, but changed his mind and instead committed to Western Michigan in 2017. As a true freshman, Fayad appeared in every game and started three, making 20 tackles, 2-and-a-half quarterback sacks and one fumble recovered.

In 2018, Fayad appeared in 13 games and was a starter in the final 12. He made a total of 34 tackles and 7.5 sacks, while also recording four forced fumbles and a recovery. He also recorded 12 tackles-for-loss, leading the school. Fayad started every game in 2019 and made a total of 53 tackles, 6.5 sacks, four forced fumbles and a recovery, earning second-team all-conference honors. Prior to the 2020 season, Fayad was ranked the number ten edge defender in the nation.

In a COVID-19-shortened 2020 season, Fayad played in four games and made 17 tackles and four sacks. After a game against Toledo, he was named to the Pro Football Focus Team of the Week.

In 2021, Fayad ranked fourth in FBS with 13 sacks and was named the Mid-American Conference Defensive Player of the Year.

== Professional career ==
=== Philadelphia Eagles ===
After going unselected in the 2022 NFL draft, Fayad was signed by the Philadelphia Eagles as an undrafted free agent. He was released on August 14, 2022.

=== Toronto Argonauts (first stint) ===
On September 3, 2022, Fayad was signed to the practice roster of the Toronto Argonauts in the Canadian Football League (CFL). He played in four games for the Argos in 2022, contributing with four defensive tackles, one special teams tackle, and one sack. Fayad won the 109th Grey Cup to conclude the season. He was released by the Argos on February 28, 2023.

=== Philadelphia Stars ===
On March 4, 2023, Fayad signed with the Philadelphia Stars of the United States Football League (USFL). The Stars folded when the XFL and USFL merged to create the United Football League (UFL).

=== Winnipeg Blue Bombers ===
Fayad signed with the Winnipeg Blue Bombers of the CFL on January 17, 2024. However, he was released in early cuts on May 12, 2024. Due to a number of injuries on the defensive line, he was later re-signed by the team on June 15, 2024. Fayad was released again on July 8, 2024.

=== Edmonton Elks ===
Fayad signed with the Edmonton Elks on February 7, 2025. He was released on May 11, 2025.

=== Toronto Argonauts (second stint) ===
On September 30, 2026, it was announced that Fayad had signed again with the Argonauts.
