= Luke Goedeke =

American football player (born 1998)

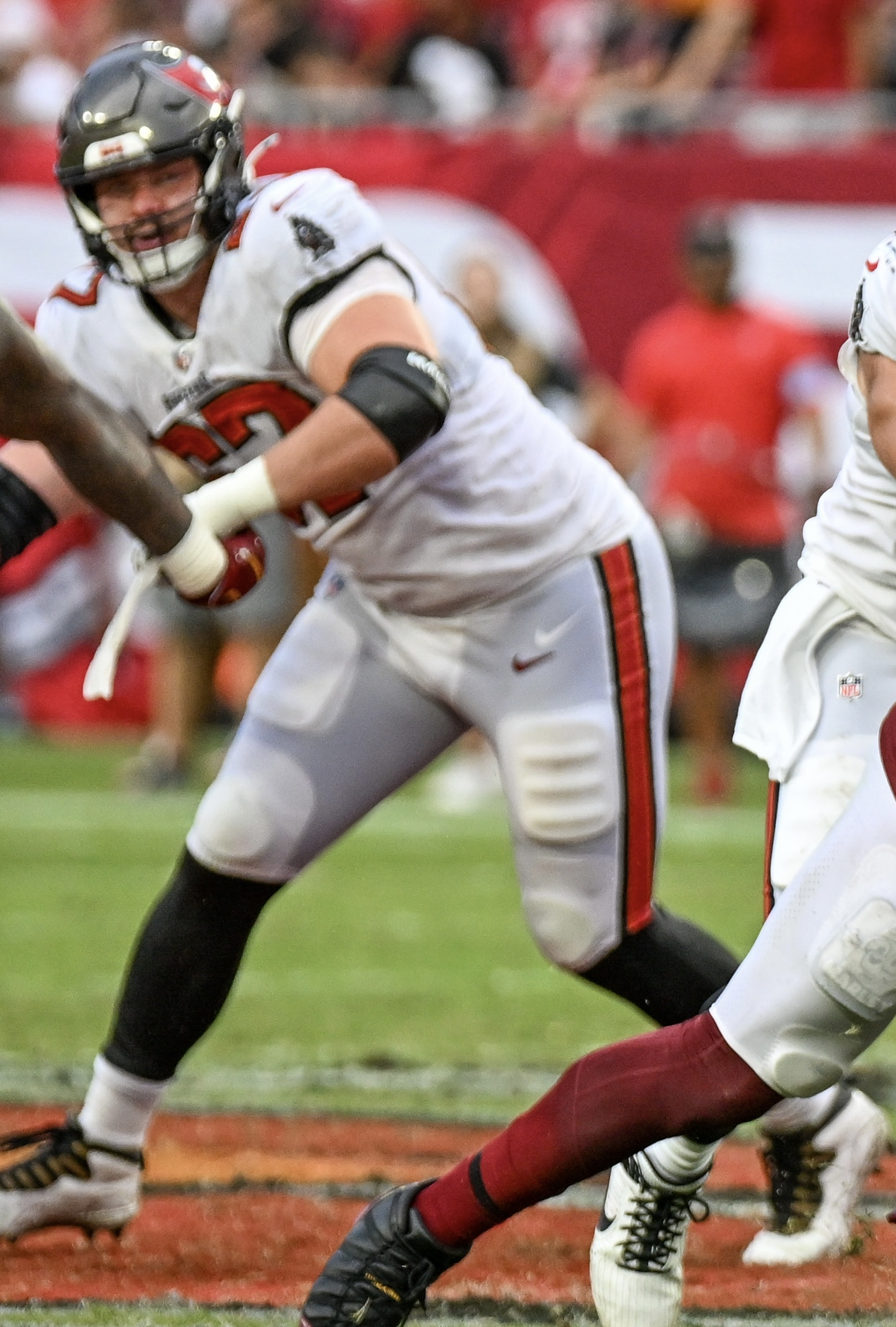
- Goedeke with the Tampa Bay Buccaneers in 2024

No. 67 – Tampa Bay Buccaneers
- Position: Offensive tackle
- Roster status: Active

Personal information
- Born: November 21, 1998 (age 27); Whitelaw, Wisconsin, U.S.
- Listed height: 6 ft 5 in (1.96 m)
- Listed weight: 312 lb (142 kg)

Career information
- High school: Valders (Valders, Wisconsin)
- College: UW–Stevens Point (2017); Central Michigan (2018–2021)
- NFL draft: 2022: 2nd round, 57th overall pick

Career history
- Tampa Bay Buccaneers (2022–present)

Awards and highlights
- First-team All-MAC (2021)

Career NFL statistics as of 2025
- Games played: 52
- Games started: 49
- Stats at Pro Football Reference

Luke Goedeke (/ˈɡʌdɪki/ GUH-dih-kee; born November 21, 1998) is an American professional football offensive tackle for the Tampa Bay Buccaneers of the National Football League (NFL). He played college football for the Wisconsin–Stevens Point Pointers before transferring to the Central Michigan Chippewas.

== Early life ==
Goedeke, who is of German descent, grew up in Whitelaw, Wisconsin, and attended Valders High School in Valders, Wisconsin. He played tight end in high school and almost gave up the sport due to a severe shoulder injury.

== College career ==
Goedeke began his collegiate career at the University of Wisconsin–Stevens Point. As a freshman, he caught 12 passes for 132 yards. After the season, Goedeke transferred to Central Michigan University. He redshirted his first season at CMU and moved from tight end to the offensive line. He was named the Chippewas' starting right tackle as a redshirt sophomore and started all 14 of the team's games. Goedeke missed the 2020 season due to a knee injury. He was named first-team All-Mid-American Conference as a redshirt junior.

== Professional career ==
Pre-draft measurables
Height	Weight	Arm length	Hand span	Wingspan	Bench press
6 ft 5 in (1.96 m)	312 lb (142 kg)	32 1/4 in (0.82 m)	9 3/4 in (0.25 m)	6 ft 7 7/8 in (2.03 m)	27 reps
All values from NFL Combine/Pro Day

Goedeke was selected in the second round with the 57th overall pick of the 2022 NFL draft by the Tampa Bay Buccaneers. On June 6, he signed his four-year rookie contract. He was named the Buccaneers Week 1 starting left guard as a rookie, starting the first seven games there. The following season he was named the starting right tackle, starting every game in 2023 and most of 2024.

On September 4, 2025, Goedeke signed a four-year, $90 million contract extension with the Buccaneers through the 2029 season. On September 18, Goedeke was placed on injured reserve due to a foot injury. He was activated on November 8, ahead of the team's Week 10 matchup against the New England Patriots.
