= Mike Brown (defensive back, born 1999) =

American football player (born 1999)

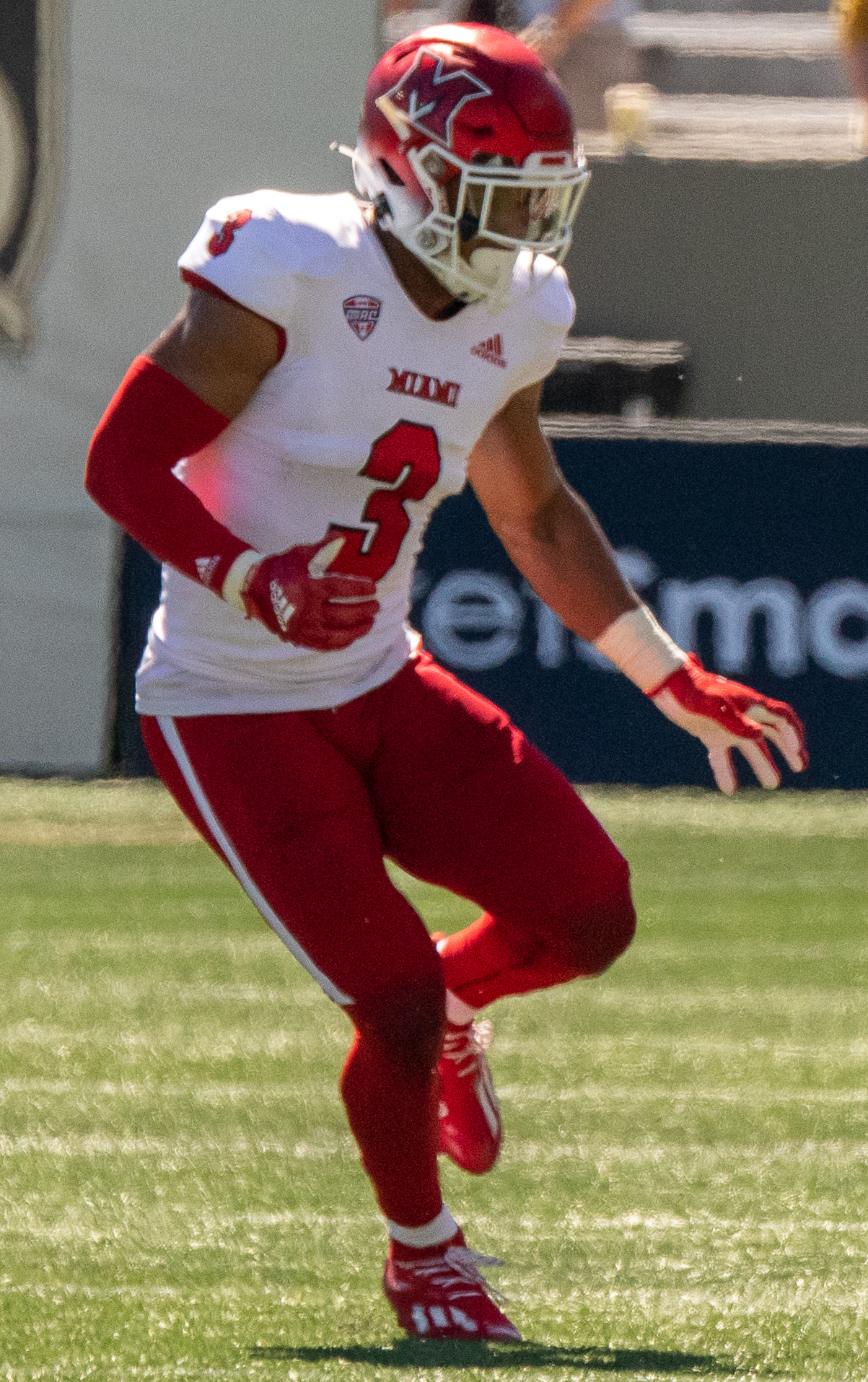
- Brown with Miami in 2021

No. 33 – New England Patriots
- Position: Safety
- Roster status: Active

Personal information
- Born: April 7, 1999 (age 27); Grand Rapids, Michigan, U.S.
- Listed height: 6 ft 1 in (1.85 m)
- Listed weight: 218 lb (99 kg)

Career information
- High school: Catholic Central (Grand Rapids)
- College: Miami (OH) (2017–2021)
- NFL draft: 2022: undrafted

Career history
- Minnesota Vikings (2022)*; Green Bay Packers (2022)*; Minnesota Vikings (2022)*; Cleveland Browns (2022); Tennessee Titans (2023–2025); New England Patriots (2026–present)
- * Offseason or practice squad member only

Career NFL statistics as of 2025
- Total tackles: 60
- Pass deflections: 2
- Stats at Pro Football Reference

Michael Curtis Brown (born April 7, 1999) is an American professional football safety for the New England Patriots of the National Football League (NFL). He played college football for the Miami RedHawks and was signed by the Minnesota Vikings as an undrafted free agent in 2022. He has also been a member of the Green Bay Packers, Cleveland Browns, and Tennessee Titans.

== Professional career ==
Pre-draft measurables
Height	Weight	Arm length	Hand span	Wingspan	40-yard dash	10-yard split	20-yard split	20-yard shuttle	Three-cone drill	Vertical jump	Broad jump	Bench press
6 ft 0 5/8 in (1.84 m)	218 lb (99 kg)	31 1/2 in (0.80 m)	9 5/8 in (0.24 m)	6 ft 4 7/8 in (1.95 m)	4.59 s	1.65 s	2.63 s	4.34 s	7.00 s	33.0 in (0.84 m)	10 ft 3 in (3.12 m)	18 reps
All values from Pro Day

=== Minnesota Vikings ===
After going unselected in the 2022 NFL draft, the Minnesota Vikings signed Brown as an undrafted free agent. He was waived at the final roster cuts, on August 30, 2022.

=== Green Bay Packers ===
On September 14, 2022, the Green Bay Packers signed Brown to their practice squad, then released him on September 22.

=== Minnesota Vikings (second stint) ===
On October 5, 2022, Brown was signed to the Vikings practice squad. He was released two weeks later.

=== Cleveland Browns ===
Brown received a tryout from the Cleveland Browns in October 2022, and was signed to the practice squad on October 25. He was elevated to the active roster for the Browns' week 11 game against the Buffalo Bills, where he made his professional debut in the loss, appearing on 16 special teams snaps. He was placed back on the practice squad the next day. He was later elevated again to the active roster, playing in the Browns' week 13 and 14 games, before being placed back on the practice squad. Brown appeared in three games for the Browns.

=== Tennessee Titans ===
On January 2, 2023, the Tennessee Titans signed Brown to their 53-man roster from the Browns' practice squad. Brown entered the 2023 season as a backup strong safety. He was placed on injured reserve on September 26. He was activated on November 18. He played nine games, including one start, recording seven combined tackles.

Brown returned for the 2024 season as a rotational safety, appearing in all 17 games and making four starts. He finished with 49 tackles and a pass deflection.

On March 11, 2025, Brown signed a one-year contract extension with the Titans. On October 4, Brown was placed on injured reserve due to a knee injury. He was activated on November 15, ahead of the team's Week 11 matchup against the Houston Texans. The next day, Brown showed up wearing the jersey of his cousin, Marshawn Kneeland, who passed away just over a week prior. He made nine appearances for Tennessee, logging three combined tackles. On December 16, Brown was placed back on injured reserve due to an ankle injury suffered in Week 15 against the San Francisco 49ers.

=== New England Patriots ===
On March 11, 2026, Brown signed with the New England Patriots. He was released by New England on August 30, and re-signed to the practice squad. On October 8, Brown was signed to the active roster.
