= Dominique Robinson =

American football player (born 1998)

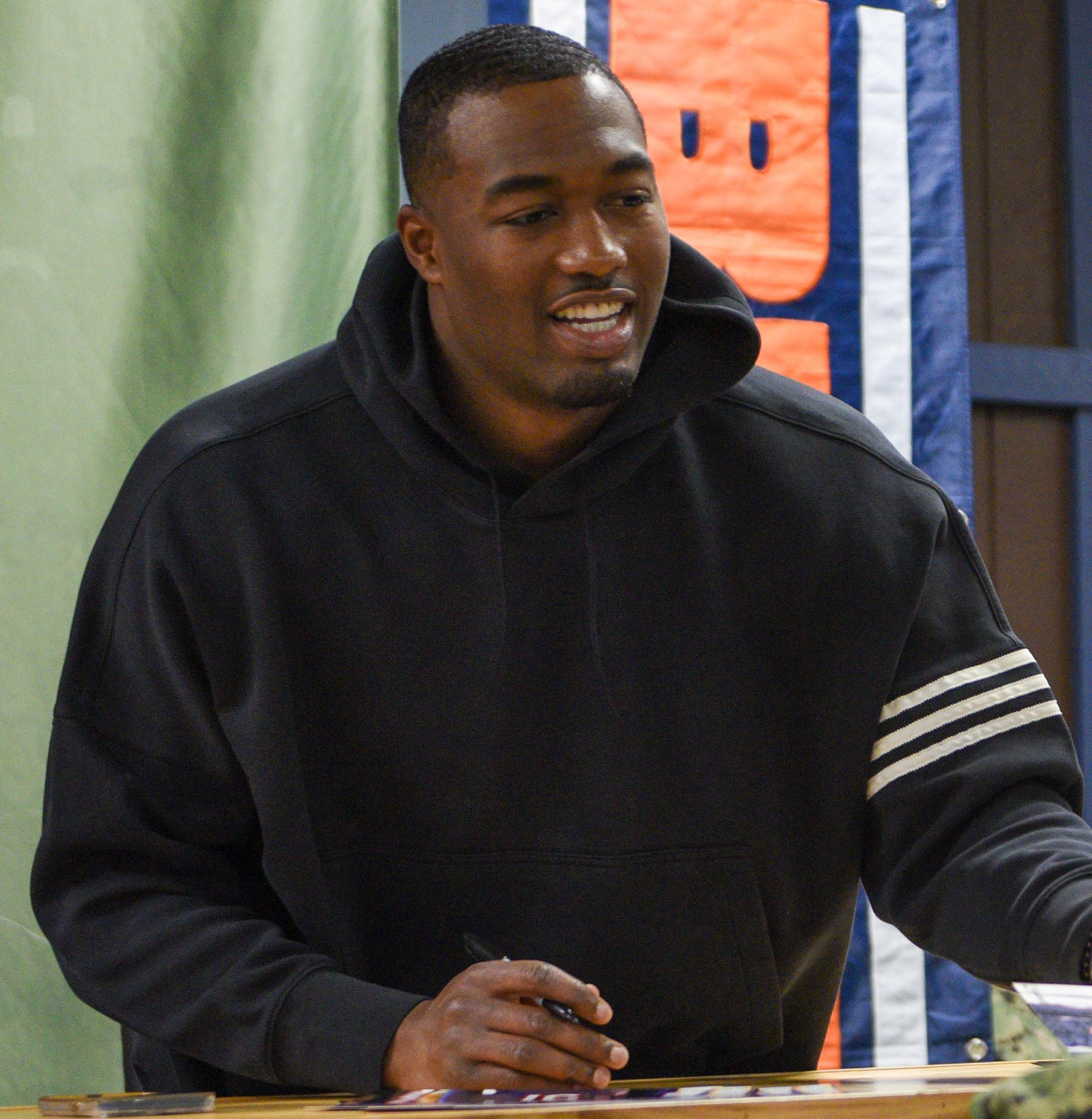
- Robinson in 2025

No. 94 – Houston Texans
- Position: Defensive end
- Roster status: Active

Personal information
- Born: July 2, 1998 (age 28); Canton, Ohio, U.S.
- Listed height: 6 ft 5 in (1.96 m)
- Listed weight: 275 lb (125 kg)

Career information
- High school: Canton McKinley
- College: Miami (OH) (2017–2021)
- NFL draft: 2022: 5th round, 174th overall pick

Career history
- Chicago Bears (2022–2025); Houston Texans (2026–present)

Awards and highlights
- Third-team All-MAC (2021)

Career NFL statistics as of 2025
- Total tackles: 68
- Sacks: 3.5
- Pass deflections: 3
- Stats at Pro Football Reference

Dominique Robinson (born July 2, 1998) is an American professional football defensive end for the Houston Texans of the National Football League (NFL). He played college football for the Miami RedHawks.

== Early life ==
Robinson grew up in Canton, Ohio and attended and initially attended Timken High School, where he played basketball and was the starting quarterback on the football team. After his sophomore year Timken was closed and merged into Canton McKinley High School. Robinson planned to focus on basketball at McKinley, but he was persuaded to continue playing football by McKinley head football coach Dan Reardon. Robinson was rated a two-star recruit and committed to play college football at Miami University, which was the only Division I FBS program to offer him a scholarship.

== College career ==
Robinson was moved from quarterback to wide receiver during his freshman season after determining he would receive more playing time at a different position. As a sophomore, He caught 13 passes for 156 yards and four touchdowns. Robinson averaged 21.1 yards per catch on 14 receptions for a total of 296 yards during his junior season. Going into his senior year Robinson changed positions again to defensive end after falling down the depth chart at wide receiver. He had two sacks and 2.5 tackles for loss in three games played during Miami's COVID-19-shortened 2020 season. Robinson decided to utilize the extra year of eligibility granted to college athletes who played in the 2020 season due to the coronavirus pandemic and return to Miami for a fifth season. In 2021, he had 28 tackles, 8.5 tackles for loss, and 4.5 sacks and was named third-team All-Mid-American Conference.

== Professional career ==
Pre-draft measurables
Height	Weight	Arm length	Hand span	Wingspan	40-yard dash	10-yard split	20-yard split	20-yard shuttle	Three-cone drill	Vertical jump	Broad jump	Bench press
6 ft 4 7/8 in (1.95 m)	253 lb (115 kg)	33 1/4 in (0.84 m)	9 3/4 in (0.25 m)	6 ft 9 7/8 in (2.08 m)	4.72 s	1.67 s	2.73 s	4.19 s	7.19 s	41.0 in (1.04 m)	10 ft 1 in (3.07 m)	25 reps
All values from NFL Combine/Pro Day

=== Chicago Bears ===
Robinson was selected by the Chicago Bears with the 174th pick in the fifth round of the 2022 NFL draft. He made his NFL debut on September 11, 2022, in the Bears' Week 1 19–10 victory over the San Francisco 49ers, in which he recorded 1½ sacks, the most by a Bears rookie in a season debut since 1987.

=== Houston Texans ===
On March 13, 2026, Robinson signed a one-year, $4 million contract with the Houston Texans. Robinson was released by the Texans as a part of final roster cuts on August 30. He re–signed with Houston on a one–year contract the following day.

== Personal life ==
Robinson is a Christian. He is married to Emma Robinson.

Robinson's father, Anthony Robinson, played college basketball at Bowling Green.

One of his brothers, Jasper Robinson, played college football at Kent State before a back injury cut his career short.
