= Samuel Womack =

American football player (born 1999)

No. 22 – New York Jets
- Position: Cornerback
- Roster status: Practice squad

Personal information
- Born: July 7, 1999 (age 27); Detroit, Michigan, U.S.
- Listed height: 5 ft 10 in (1.78 m)
- Listed weight: 189 lb (86 kg)

Career information
- High school: East English Village Prep (Detroit)
- College: Toledo (2017–2021)
- NFL draft: 2022: 5th round, 172nd overall pick

Career history
- San Francisco 49ers (2022–2023); Indianapolis Colts (2024); Tennessee Titans (2025); New York Jets (2025–present)

Awards and highlights
- First-team All-MAC (2021)

Career NFL statistics as of 2025
- Total tackles: 73
- Forced fumbles: 1
- Fumble recoveries: 1
- Pass deflections: 13
- Interceptions: 3
- Stats at Pro Football Reference

Samuel Womack III (born July 7, 1999) is an American professional football cornerback for the New York Jets of the National Football League (NFL). He played college football for the Toledo Rockets.

== Early life ==
Womack attended East English Village Preparatory Academy in Detroit, Michigan, where he played high school football. As a senior, he gained over 1,000 receiving yards, caught 20 touchdown passes, and made 11 interceptions which earned him All-State honors.

== College career ==
Womack was a member of the Toledo Rockets for five seasons. In 2020, he was nominated for the Burlsworth Trophy. He finished his college career with 126 tackles and 4.5 tackles for loss with 39 passes defended and five interceptions in 53 games played.

== Professional career ==
Pre-draft measurables
Height	Weight	Arm length	Hand span	Wingspan	40-yard dash	10-yard split	20-yard split	20-yard shuttle	Three-cone drill	Vertical jump	Broad jump
5 ft 9 in (1.75 m)	189 lb (86 kg)	31 7/8 in (0.81 m)	8 1/4 in (0.21 m)	6 ft 2 3/4 in (1.90 m)	4.40 s	1.54 s	2.48 s	4.18 s	6.87 s	36.0 in (0.91 m)	9 ft 10 in (3.00 m)
All values from Pro Day

=== San Francisco 49ers ===
Womack was selected in the fifth round (172nd overall) of the 2022 NFL draft by the San Francisco 49ers. As a rookie, he appeared in 16 regular season games and three playoff games. He finished with 19 total tackles, one interception, two passes defended, and one forced fumble.

On September 16, 2023, Womack was placed on injured reserve. He was activated on November 23.

Womack was waived by the 49ers on August 27, 2024.

=== Indianapolis Colts ===
On August 28, 2024, Womack was claimed off waivers by the Indianapolis Colts.

On August 26, 2025, Womack was waived by the Colts as part of final roster cuts.

=== Tennessee Titans ===
On August 27, 2025, Womack was claimed off waivers by the Tennessee Titans. He was waived on November 26.

=== New York Jets ===
On December 2, 2025, Womack was signed to the New York Jets' practice squad. He signed a reserve/future contract with New York on January 5, 2026.

On August 30, 2026, Womack was released by the Jets as a part of final roster cuts; he was re-signed to the team's practice squad the following day.
