= Bernhard Raimann =

Austrian-born American football player (born 1997)

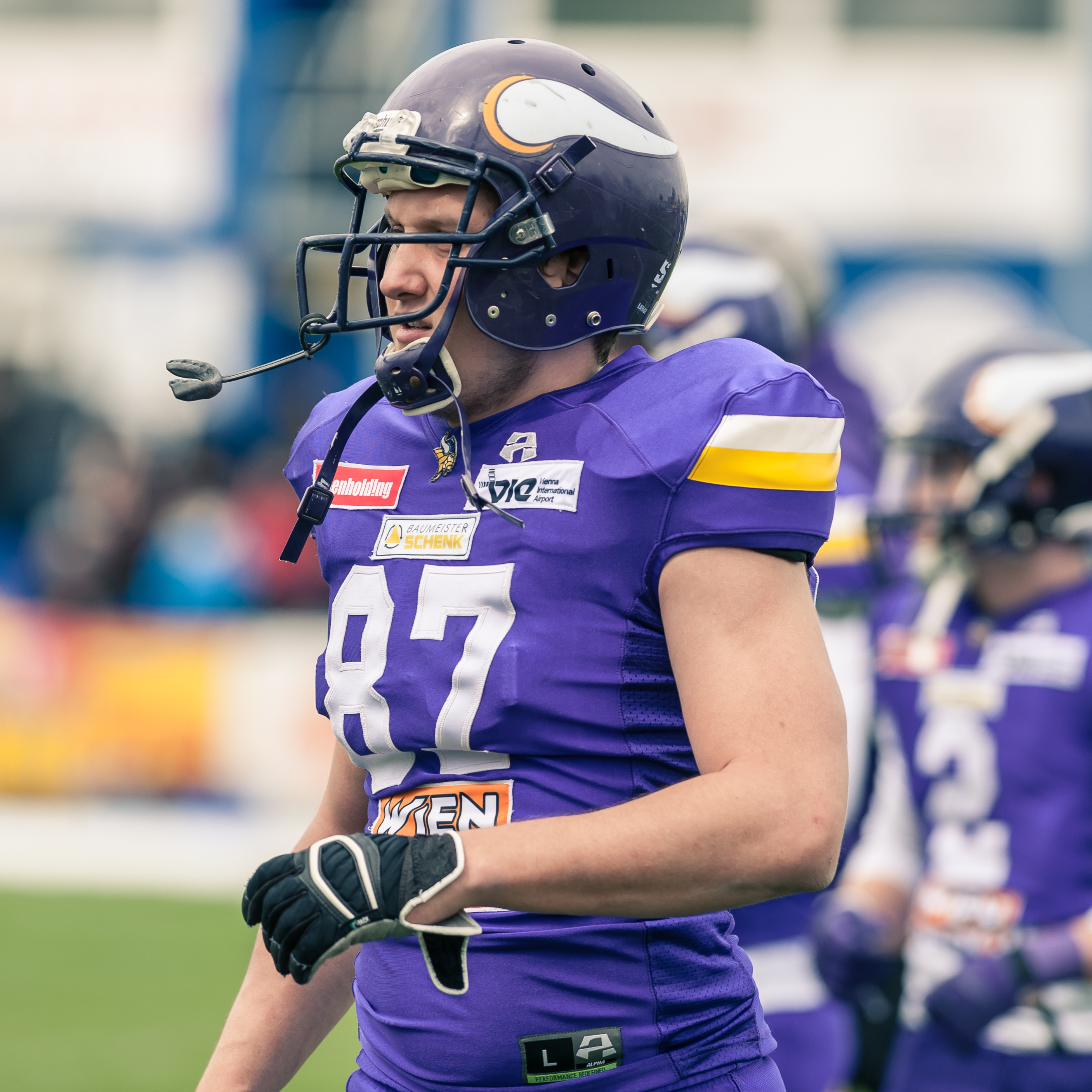
- Raimann with the Vienna Vikings in 2016

No. 79 – Indianapolis Colts
- Position: Offensive tackle
- Roster status: Active

Personal information
- Born: September 23, 1997 (age 29); Steinbrunn, Austria
- Listed height: 6 ft 6 in (1.98 m)
- Listed weight: 303 lb (137 kg)

Career information
- High school: Ballsportgymnasium Wien (Vienna, Austria)
- College: Central Michigan (2018–2021)
- NFL draft: 2022: 3rd round, 77th overall pick

Career history
- Indianapolis Colts (2022–present)

Awards and highlights
- Second-team All-American (2021); First-team All-MAC (2021)

Career NFL statistics as of 2025
- Games played: 61
- Games started: 56
- Stats at Pro Football Reference

Bernhard Raimann (born September 23, 1997) is an Austrian professional American football offensive tackle for the Indianapolis Colts of the National Football League (NFL). He played college football for the Central Michigan Chippewas and was selected by the Colts in the third round of the 2022 NFL draft.

== Early life ==
Raimann grew up in Steinbrunn, Austria. He began playing American football at the age of 14 for the Vienna Vikings' youth team. Raimann attended Ballsportgymnasium in Vienna, a publicly funded upper secondary school for elite competitive athletes, and attended Delton-Kellogg High School in Delton, Michigan as an exchange student for his junior year.

While on exchange, Raimann lived with a host family that included a former Central Michigan University football player, Rollie Ferris, and his future college teammate, Tyden Ferris. He returned to Austria after the year and completed his compulsory service in the Austrian military after graduating from Ballsportgymnasium Wien. Raimann committed to play college football at Central Michigan after his military service was completed.

== College career ==
Raimann played tight end during his first two seasons at Central Michigan. He caught 20 passes for 164 yards over the course of his first two seasons. He moved to offensive tackle after his sophomore year and started all six of the Chippewas' games during its COVID-19-shortened 2020 season. In 2021, Pro Football Focus named Raimann their Offensive Player of the Year for the Mid-American Conference.

== Professional career ==
Pre-draft measurables
Height	Weight	Arm length	Hand span	Wingspan	40-yard dash	10-yard split	20-yard split	20-yard shuttle	Three-cone drill	Vertical jump	Broad jump	Bench press
6 ft 6 1/8 in (1.98 m)	303 lb (137 kg)	32 7/8 in (0.84 m)	10 1/4 in (0.26 m)	6 ft 8 1/8 in (2.04 m)	5.05 s	1.73 s	2.87 s	4.32 s	7.34 s	30.5 in (0.77 m)	9 ft 9 in (2.97 m)	30 reps
All values from NFL Combine/Pro Day

Raimann was selected in the third round (77th overall) of the 2022 NFL draft by the Indianapolis Colts.

According to Colts beat writer Nate Atkins of The Indianapolis Star, the team counted on moving veteran lineman Matt Pryor to the critical left tackle spot in 2022. This experiment proved a debacle, however, and in Week 5 Raimann was thrust into the starting lineup by head coach Frank Reich. Raimann would start 11 of the final 13 games of his rookie year.

During the off-season, Raimann worked adding strength and mass to his 6'6" frame, putting on 15 pounds. He was named the starting left tackle from the opening week of the 2023 season and would play in 15 games during the year. Raimann's performance was greatly improved during his sophomore season, with Sports Info Solutions analysis indicating that his rate of quarterback sacks allowed fell from 2.2% as a rookie to 1.2% in year two, with his percentage of blown run blocks similarly dropping from 3.7% to 2.1%.

Moreover, Raimann's number of penalties also declined in 2023 versus his rookie 2022 campaign—from 7 accepted flags to 4—despite his participation in 180 more passing snaps during his second season.

On July 28, 2025, the Colts signed Raimann to a four-year, $100 million contract extension.
