= 2021 Frisco Football Classic =

Postseason college football bowl game

- 1st Frisco Football Classic
North Texas Mean Green	Miami RedHawks
(6–6)	(6–6)
C–USA	MAC
14	27
Head coach: Seth Littrell	Head coach: Chuck Martin
	1	2	3	4	Total
North Texas	7	7	0	0	14
Miami	10	10	7	0	27
- Date: December 23, 2021
- Season: 2021
- Stadium: Toyota Stadium
- Location: Frisco, Texas
- MVP: Brett Gabbert (QB, Miami) & Jacquez Warren (DB, Miami)
- Favorite: Miami by 3.5
- Referee: Marshall Lewis (Sun Belt)
- Attendance: 11,721

United States TV coverage
- Network: ESPN
- Announcers: Clay Matvick (play-by-play), Rocky Boiman (analyst), and Tiffany Blackmon (sideline)

International TV coverage
- Network: ESPN Brazil
- Announcers: Matheus Suman (play-by-play) and Antony Curti (analyst)

The 2021 Frisco Football Classic was a college football bowl game played on December 23, 2021, in Frisco, Texas, with kickoff at 3:30 p.m. ET (2:30 p.m. CT local time), televised on ESPN. It was one of the 2021–22 bowl games concluding the 2021 FBS football season.

The NCAA approved the bowl game in order to accommodate all 83 bowl-eligible teams; otherwise, one bowl-eligible team would not have been selected for a bowl game. (Note: There were 83 teams that finished bowl-eligible, plus Hawaii, who compiled six wins in a 13-game schedule and would be selected ahead of any five-win team.) The added bowl game essentially served as a replacement for the canceled San Francisco Bowl.

== Teams ==
The game features teams from the Group of Five conferences. This was the first time that North Texas and Miami University ever played each other.

=== North Texas Mean Green ===
North Texas, from Conference USA (C–USA), finished the regular season 6–6, 5–3 in conference play. The Mean Green won their season opener against Northwestern State, 44–14, but then lost the next six games, dropping to 1–6. North Texas then went on to win its next five games, including upset victories over UTEP and a 45–23 victory over then-undefeated #22 UTSA in the regular season finale, handing UTSA its first loss of the season.

=== Miami RedHawks ===
Miami, from the Mid-American Conference (MAC), finished the regular season 6–6, 5–3 in conference play. In the team's regular season finale, the RedHawks had a chance to play in the MAC Championship Game by defeating Kent State. Miami trailed 31–41 with 11:17 left in regulation, coming back to tie the game 41–41 to send it to overtime. Kent State went on offense first, scoring a touchdown and making the point after attempt. The RedHawks would score a touchdown and attempted a two-point conversion pass, but the pass was incomplete. Miami lost 47–48, sending Kent State to the conference championship game.

== Game summary ==
2021 Frisco Football Classic

Quarter	1	2	3	4	Total
North Texas	7	7	0	0	14
Miami	10	10	7	0	27

at Toyota Stadium • Frisco, Texas

- Date: December 23, 2021
- Game time: 3:30 p.m. EST (2:30 p.m. local CST)
- Game weather: Sunny • Temperature: 73 °F (23 °C) • Wind: 15 mph (24 km/h) N
- Game attendance: 11,721
- TV announcers (ESPN): Clay Matvick (play-by-play), Rocky Boiman (analyst), and Tiffany Blackmon (sideline)
- Box score

Game information

First quarter

- 12:27 MIA – Graham Nicholson 48-yard field goal. Drive: 6 plays, 36 yards, 1:22. Miami 3–0
- 8:06 UNT – Isaiah Johnson 1-yard run, Ethan Mooney kick good. Drive 12 plays, 75 yards, 4:21. North Texas 7–3
- 3:59 MIA – Kenny Tracy 8-yard run, Graham Nicholson kick good. Drive 8 plays, 75 yards, 4:03. Miami 10–7

Second quarter

- 11:32 UNT – Austin Aune 2-yard run, Ethan Mooney kick good. Drive 10 plays, 90 yards, 3:21. North Texas 14–10
- 6:52 MIA – Graham Nicholson 36-yard field goal. Drive: 10 plays, 57 yards, 4:40. North Texas 14–13
- 4:08 MIA – Kevin Davis 5-yard pass from Brett Gabbert, Graham Nicholson kick good. 4 plays, 30 yards, 1:56. Miami 20–14

Third quarter

- 11:31 MIA – Nate Muersch 11-yard pass from Brett Gabbert, Graham Nicholson kick good. 8 plays, 75 yards, 3:29. Miami 27–14

Fourth quarter
no scoring plays

=== Statistics ===
Statistics	UNT	MIA
First downs	18	27
Plays–yards	63–317	79–426
Rushes–yards	32–89	48–198
Passing yards	228	228
Passing: comp–att–int	15–32–2	22–31–0
Turnovers		
Time of possession	21:39	38:21

Team	Category	Player	Statistics
North Texas	Passing	Austin Aune	15/32, 228 yards, 2 INT
North Texas	Rushing	Austin Aune	9 carries, 28 yards, TD
North Texas	Receiving	Roderic Burns	4 receptions, 87 yards
Miami	Passing	Brett Gabbert	22/31, 228 yards, 2 TD
Miami	Rushing	Kenny Tracy	14 carries, 92 yards, TD
Miami	Receiving	Jack Sorenson	7 receptions, 116 yards

== See also ==
- 2021 Frisco Bowl, played at the same venue two days prior
- Frisco Football Classic, a recurring bowl established in 2025, which does not consider the 2021 Frisco Football Classic as part of its lineage
