= Tycen Anderson =

American football player (born 1999)

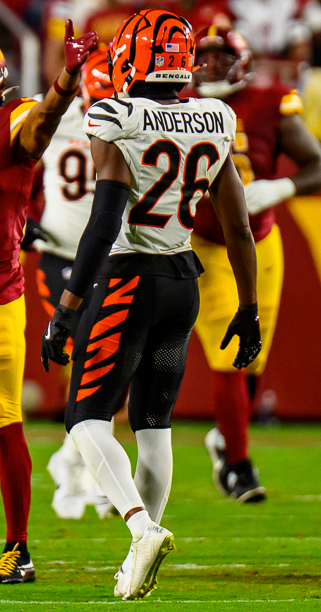
- Anderson with the Cincinnati Bengals in 2025

No. 6 – Denver Broncos
- Position: Strong safety
- Roster status: Active

Personal information
- Born: June 13, 1999 (age 27); Toledo, Ohio, U.S.
- Listed height: 6 ft 2 in (1.88 m)
- Listed weight: 210 lb (95 kg)

Career information
- High school: St. John's Jesuit (Toledo)
- College: Toledo (2017–2021)
- NFL draft: 2022: 5th round, 166th overall pick

Career history
- Cincinnati Bengals (2022–2025); Denver Broncos (2026–present)

Awards and highlights
- First-team All-MAC (2021); Second-team All-MAC (2020)

Career NFL statistics as of Week 4, 2026
- Tackles: 44
- Pass deflections: 1
- Stats at Pro Football Reference

Tycen William Anderson (born June 13, 1999) is an American professional football strong safety for the Denver Broncos of the National Football League (NFL). He played college football for the Toledo Rockets and was drafted by the Cincinnati Bengals in the fifth round of the 2022 NFL draft.

== Early life ==
Anderson grew up in Toledo, Ohio and attended St. John's Jesuit High School and Academy, where he competed in basketball, football, and track. Anderson committed to play college football at Toledo over offers from Air Force, Kentucky, Bowling Green, and Eastern Kentucky.

== College career ==
Anderson played in all 14 of Toledo's games as a freshman and recorded 30 tackles with four passes broken up. He was named second-team All-Mid-American Conference (MAC) after playing in six games due to the MAC's COVID-19-shortened 2020 season. Anderson decided to utilize the extra year of eligibility granted to college athletes who played in the 2020 season due to the coronavirus pandemic and return to Toledo for a fifth season. He recorded 44 tackles with one sack and two passes broken up in his final season.

== Professional career ==
Pre-draft measurables
Height	Weight	Arm length	Hand span	Wingspan	40-yard dash	10-yard split	20-yard split	20-yard shuttle	Three-cone drill	Vertical jump	Broad jump	Bench press
6 ft 1 7/8 in (1.88 m)	209 lb (95 kg)	33 in (0.84 m)	10 1/8 in (0.26 m)	6 ft 6 7/8 in (2.00 m)	4.36 s	1.50 s	2.55 s	4.27 s	6.64 s	37.0 in (0.94 m)	10 ft 3 in (3.12 m)	12 reps
All values from NFL Combine/Pro Day

=== Cincinnati Bengals ===
Anderson was selected by the Cincinnati Bengals with the 166th overall pick in the fifth round of the 2022 NFL draft. He was placed on injured reserve on September 2, 2022.

Anderson began the 2023 season as the backup free safety behind Daxton Hill on the depth chart. He became a key special teams player for the Bengals, playing all his snaps on kick and punt returns. In Week 8 against the San Francisco 49ers, Anderson tore his ACL early in the game, but played through the injury. On November 3, 2023, Anderson was placed on injured reserve, ending his season prematurely. He finished the season with eight tackles, all on special teams.

=== Denver Broncos ===
On March 19, 2026, Anderson signed a one-year, $1.5 million contract with the Denver Broncos. He later specified that he would be playing the gunner position on special teams for the Broncos.

== NFL career statistics ==
Legend
**Bold**	Career high

=== Regular season ===
Year	Team	Games		Tackles					Interceptions						Fumbles				
Year	Team	GP	GS	Cmb	Solo	Ast	Sck	TFL	Int	Yds	Avg	Lng	TD	PD	FF	Fum	FR	Yds	TD
2023	CIN	7	0	8	5	3	0.0	0	0	0	0.0	0	0	0	0	0	0	0	0
2024	CIN	17	0	11	**10**	1	0.0	0	0	0	0.0	0	0	0	0	0	0	0	0
2025	CIN	17	0	**23**	**10**	**13**	0.0	0	0	0	0.0	0	0	**1**	0	0	0	0	0
2026	DEN	4	0	2	0	2	0.0	0	0	0	0.0	0	0	0	0	0	0	0	0
Career		45	0	44	25	19	0.0	0	0	0	0.0	0	0	1	0	0	0	0	0
