= 2021 Bahamas Bowl =

Postseason college football bowl game

- 7th Bahamas Bowl
Middle Tennessee Blue Raiders	Toledo Rockets
(6–6)	(7–5)
C–USA	MAC
31	24
Head coach: Rick Stockstill	Head coach: Jason Candle
	1	2	3	4	Total
Middle Tennessee	7	7	0	17	31
Toledo	0	17	0	7	24
- Date: December 17, 2021
- Season: 2021
- Stadium: Thomas Robinson Stadium
- Location: Nassau, Bahamas
- MVP: Nicholas Vattiato (QB, Middle Tennessee) & DQ Thomas (LB, Middle Tennessee)
- Favorite: Toledo by 10
- Referee: Nate Black (AAC)
- Attendance: 13,596

United States TV coverage
- Network: ESPN
- Announcers: Matt Barrie (play-by-play), Booger McFarland (analyst), and Katie George (sideline)

International TV coverage
- Network: ESPN Brazil
- Announcers: Matheus Pinheiro (play-by-play) and Antony Curti (analyst)

The 2021 Bahamas Bowl was a college football bowl game played on December 17, 2021, at Thomas Robinson Stadium in Nassau, Bahamas. The seventh annual Bahamas Bowl, as well as the first to take place after the COVID-19 pandemic forced the cancellation of the 2020 edition, the game featured the Middle Tennessee Blue Raiders of Conference USA and the Toledo Rockets of the Mid-American Conference. The game began at 12:00 p.m. EST and aired on ESPN. It was the first of the 2021–22 bowl games concluding the 2021 FBS football season.

Both teams entered the game with similar records, as the Blue Raiders concluded their regular season with a 6–6 mark and the Rockets finished theirs with a record of 7–5. Each team made their second Bahamas Bowl appearance; Toledo made their 18th appearance in a bowl game, five more than Middle Tennessee's 13 total appearances. In previews of the contest, each team had been identified as having very different strengths. Middle Tennessee's defense earned praise, though their offense struggled throughout the season, and they were without quarterback Chase Cunningham after his injury in late October 2021. Toledo's rushing offense was widely regarded as their team's best quality, with the Rockets averaging nearly 200 rushing yards per game throughout the year.

The game began with an edge towards defense, as Nick Vattiato's six-yard touchdown pass to Yusuf Ali for Middle Tennessee was the only score of the first quarter. Both offenses showed up more in the second quarter; Toledo scored twice in two minutes to tie the game and then take the Rockets' first lead, though Middle Tennessee tied the contest again with nine minutes until halftime. A Toledo field goal gave the Rockets a three-point halftime lead, which they carried into the fourth quarter after the third quarter finished scoreless. Starting with the first play of the game's final period, Middle Tennessee started a streak of seventeen unanswered points. Despite a touchdown by Toledo with just over a minute remaining in the game, Middle Tennessee maintained the lead and won the game, 31–24.

== Teams ==
This was the seventh edition of the game; the 2020 edition was cancelled due to travel restrictions related to the COVID-19 pandemic. Consistent with conference tie-ins, the game featured the Middle Tennessee Blue Raiders from Conference USA and the Toledo Rockets from the Mid-American Conference. This was the first meeting between Middle Tennessee and Toledo, making the game one of 18 to feature teams who had not previously met. It was also the first edition of the Bahamas Bowl to feature any team that previously played in the bowl; both teams made their second appearance, with Middle Tennessee losing the 2015 edition and Toledo losing the 2018 edition. Overall, Middle Tennessee made their 13th bowl game appearance, while Toledo made their 18th.

=== Middle Tennessee Blue Raiders ===
After starting their season with a win over Monmouth, Middle Tennessee (MTSU) suffered three straight road losses against Virginia Tech, UTSA, and Charlotte, dropping their overall record to 1–3. They earned their first conference victory to begin October against Marshall, though they faltered again the following week at Liberty. After a bye week, MTSU earned their first road victory of the season against UConn and then returned home to defeat Southern Miss on homecoming, which bumped their winning percentage back up to .500. The Blue Raiders would alternate wins and losses throughout the month of November; they fell to Western Kentucky on the road, defeated FIU at home, and lost to Old Dominion at home leading up to the regular season's final week. Facing Florida Atlantic, with a win required for bowl eligibility, Middle Tennessee pulled out a ten-point victory to earn their sixth win of the year. They accepted their invitation to the Bahamas Bowl on November 28, 2021, the day following their final regular season game. The Blue Raiders entered the game with a record of 6–6, and a 4–4 mark in conference play.

=== Toledo Rockets ===
Toledo began their season strong, with a dominant win over Norfolk State and a close loss against No. 8 Notre Dame that saw the Rockets nearly pull the upset. A loss to Colorado State followed, but Toledo bounced back with back-to-back road wins against Ball State and UMass. Toledo's homecoming game saw the Rockets fall by two points to Northern Illinois, and they dropped another close game the following week, this time on the road against Central Michigan by a field goal in overtime. A defeat of Western Michigan concluded the month of October, but November started the following week with a loss to Eastern Michigan. Now 4–5, Toledo needed two wins in their final three games to attain bowl eligibility; they would go on to win all three, against Bowling Green, Ohio, and Akron, each by at least twelve points. Toledo accepted their invitation to the bowl on November 28, 2021, the day after their final regular season game. The Rockets entered the game with a record of 7–5, and a 5–3 mark in conference play.

== Game summary ==
=== Pre-game ===
According to previews and predictions of the game, Toledo was expected to win, with their rushing offense usually cited as a key quality of the team's effectiveness. Toledo entered the game averaging nearly 200 rushing yards per game over the course of the season, having eclipsed the 200-yard mark in seven of their twelve games, including all of the final four. The Rockets were praised for being one of the few teams ranked in the top 25 in both offensive and defensive yards per play, and the lack of turnovers committed by the Toledo offense was expected to somewhat neutralize the high turnover-forcing numbers of the MTSU defense. Middle Tennessee received more mixed reviews; with quarterback Chase Cunningham out with an injury since October, the Blue Raiders' offense was expected to face a challenge. Middle Tennessee was described as "more of a defensive team" by some; the MTSU offense was not included in the nation's top 100 teams by yards per play over the course of the season. Overall, Toledo entered the game favored by ten points.

=== First half ===
Scheduled for a 12:00 p.m. EST start, the game began at 12:05 p.m. with Scott Payne's opening kickoff, which was returned by Toledo's Jacquez Stuart to the Rockets' 36-yard-line. The game started slowly for both offenses as both teams were forced to punt on each of their first two drives. The Rockets' opening drive saw them gain a first down on their second play, but three straight incomplete passes afterwards brought up 4th & 10; MTSU got the ball on their own 10-yard-line and achieved a first down on their first and second offensive plays of the game but ended up punting on 4th & 4 a few plays later. Both teams then went three-and-out on their second drives, each finishing with a net loss of two yards on their three plays. Toledo had a chance at the game's first points on their next drive, as they drove from their own 27-yard-line to the Middle Tennessee 17-yard-line, though Thomas Cluckey missed a 35-yard field goal attempt, giving the Blue Raiders the ball back. Middle Tennessee was able to capitalize off of this miscue – a roughing the passer penalty on 3rd & 15 extended the drive and a 14-yard rush on a 3rd & 7 later in the series put MTSU in the red zone; three plays later, quarterback Nick Vattiato completed a pass to Yusuf Ali for a six-yard touchdown, giving Middle Tennessee a 7–0 lead. Toledo took possession at their own 25-yard-line after the ensuing kickoff went out for a touchback. They advanced the ball to the Middle Tennessee 48-yard-line in four plays before the first quarter expired.

In the first few plays of the second quarter, Toledo found themselves facing 4th & 1, but Dequan Finn's 40-yard rushing touchdown converted it and evened the score at seven. This was the first in a sequence of good play by the Rockets; Middle Tennessee's ensuing drive ended with the Toledo defense forcing a punt on 4th & 19 and the Toledo offense capitalized with a one-play scoring drive right after getting the ball back. Dequan Finn's pass to Matt Landers for a 90-yard touchdown gave the Rockets their first lead of the game, though they would not hold it for long. Middle Tennessee would even the score again on their next drive, reaching Toledo territory after just two plays and scoring on a 1-yard touchdown run by Frank Peasant with just under nine minutes on the clock. Toledo would resume possession at their own 30-yard-line, but much of their good fortune from earlier in the quarter had run out; a delay of game penalty set them back five yards and they were unable to recover, going three-and-out and punting the ball back to the Blue Raiders. Each team would then trade short, unproductive drives; Middle Tennessee ran four plays before punting on fourth-and-long (the punt was muffed by Devin Maddox, though he was able to recover the ball himself) while Toledo ran five before punting on 4th & 6. Getting the ball on their own 13-yard-line with three and a half minutes to play, Middle Tennessee advanced the ball to their own 33-yard-line before Mike DiLiello's pass was intercepted by Samuel Womack, who returned it to the Blue Raiders' 16-yard-line. Toledo was unable to advance the ball very far, but still was able to successfully convert a 32-yard field goal to give them a three-point lead. With just over a minute remaining in the half, Middle Tennessee was able to get into field goal range with seconds to spare, but Zeke Rankin's 37-yard attempt as time expired was no good, giving Toledo a 17–14 halftime lead.

=== Second half ===
Middle Tennessee received the ball at their own 25-yard-line to begin the game's third quarter following a touchback. They drove to the Toledo 46-yard-line before being forced to punt on 4th & 9, though Kyle Ulbrich was able to coffin corner the kick, which went out-of-bounds at the Toledo 2-yard-line. A pair of incomplete passes and a rush for no gain, coupled with a false start penalty, doomed the Toledo drive, and they punted the ball back just a few plays after receiving it. Toledo's punt was not as good; kicking from his own end zone, Bailey Flint's punt was returned to the Rockets' 38-yard-line, giving Middle Tennessee great field position and a chance to retake the lead. This chance was not taken, however; the drive started well, with a six-yard rush on first down, but three consecutive incomplete passes followed, causing MTSU to turn the ball over on downs. Toledo took possession at that spot and drove into Blue Raiders territory within four plays, and several minutes later found themselves facing 4th & 3 at the MTSU 25-yard-line. They opted to attempt the 43-yard field goal, which resulted in Thomas Cluckey's second miss of the day. The Blue Raiders took the ball back at their own 25-yard-line as a result with exactly five and a half minutes remaining. The drive was nearly stopped short as a result of a strip sack, but a personal foul negated it and kept the drive going. MTSU would go on to convert a 4th & 3 by way of a four-yard pass, and got the ball to the Toledo 17-yard-line before the scoreless third quarter came to a close.

While the third quarter saw no scoring, the fourth saw a touchdown on its first play: Mike DiLiello ran for a 17-yard score just six seconds into the quarter, reinstating Middle Tennessee's lead. The teams would then trade punts for the first half of the quarter. Toledo, after a 23-yard rush achieved a first down on their initial play, failed to gain any further yards, and punted the ball away, which was fair caught at the Middle Tennessee 20-yard-line. Middle Tennessee had a lengthier drive but did not gain that many more yards, as they drove to the Toledo 48-yard-line but had to punt on 4th & 9; another coffin corner from Ulbrich gave the Rockets the ball back at their own 5-yard-line. Toledo was unable to make much of their ensuing drive, despite gaining a first down; they opted to punt on 4th & 2 at their own 27-yard-line and gave MTSU the ball back at the Blue Raiders' 41-yard-line. The Middle Tennessee offense was quick to capitalize, scoring in two plays on a 59-yard touchdown pass from Vattiato to Jarrin Pierce and giving the Blue Raiders a two-possession lead. Toledo committed their first and only turnover of the game on their next possession after Dequan Finn's pass was intercepted by Zaylin Wood at the Toledo 23-yard-line. Middle Tennessee extended their lead shortly thereafter despite only driving for five yards – Zeke Rankin successfully made a 35-yard field goal with four and a half minutes to play. Toledo's final drive of the game was perhaps their most successful; receiving the ball at their own 17-yard-line, the Rockets gained five first downs over the course of fourteen plays, finishing with a 13-yard touchdown pass from Finn to DeMeer Blankumsee, narrowing the MTSU lead to 31–24. Thomas Cluckey's onside kick attempt was recovered by Middle Tennessee, who was then able to line up in victory formation for two plays and run out the remaining one minute. The game ended at 3:49 p.m., and took a total of three hours and forty-four minutes.

=== Scoring summary ===
2021 Bahamas Bowl

Quarter	1	2	3	4	Total
Middle Tennessee	7	7	0	17	31
Toledo	0	17	0	7	24

at Thomas Robinson Stadium • Nassau, Bahamas

- Date: December 17, 2021
- Game time: 12:00 p.m. EST
- Game weather: Sunny • Temperature: 80 °F (27 °C) • Wind: E 14 mph
- Game attendance: 13,596
- Referee: Nate Black
- TV announcers (ESPN): Matt Barrie (play-by-play), Booger McFarland (analyst), and Katie George (sideline)

Scoring summary

Quarter	Time	Drive			Team	Scoring information	Score	
Quarter	Time	Plays	Yards	TOP	Team	Scoring information	Middle Tennessee	Toledo
1	1:30	14	70	4:20	Middle Tennessee	Yusuf Ali 6-yard touchdown reception from Nick Vattiato, Zeke Rankin kick good	7	0
2	13:52	6	80	2:38	Toledo	Dequan Finn 40-yard touchdown run, Thomas Cluckey kick good	7	7
2	11:11	1	90	0:13	Toledo	Matt Landers 90-yard touchdown reception from Dequan Finn, Thomas Cluckey kick good	7	14
2	8:58	7	85	2:13	Middle Tennessee	Frank Peasant 1-yard touchdown run, Zeke Rankin kick good	14	14
2	1:05	4	2	1:24	Toledo	32-yard field goal by Thomas Cluckey	14	17
4	14:54	14	75	6:00	Middle Tennessee	Mike DiLiello 17-yard touchdown run, Zeke Rankin kick good	21	17
4	6:24	2	59	0:45	Middle Tennessee	Jarrin Pierce 59-yard touchdown reception from Nick Vattiato, Zeke Rankin kick good	28	17
4	4:34	4	5	1:04	Middle Tennessee	35-yard field goal by Zeke Rankin	31	17
4	1:08	15	83	3:19	Toledo	DeMeer Blankumsee 13-yard touchdown reception from Dequan Finn, Zeke Rankin kick good	31	24
"TOP" = time of possession. For other American football terms, see Glossary of American football.							31	24

== Statistics ==
Team statistical comparison
Statistic	Middle Tennessee	Toledo
First downs	26	21
First downs rushing	10	13
First downs passing	13	7
First downs penalty	3	1
Third down efficiency	7–16	4–15
Fourth down efficiency	1–2	1–1
Total plays–net yards	85–435	71–447
Rushing attempts–net yards	44–159	32–235
Yards per rush	3.6	7.3
Yards passing	276	212
Pass completions–attempts	24–41	18–39
Interceptions thrown	1	1
Punt returns–total yards	3–25	2–8
Kickoff returns–total yards	2–22	4–99
Punts–average yardage	5–44.2	7–42.9
Fumbles–lost	1–0	2–0
Penalties–yards	7–40	12–122
Time of possession	31:16	26:03

Middle Tennessee statistics
Blue Raiders passing
	C–A	Yds	TD–INT
Nick Vattiato	23–35	270	2–0
Mike DiLiello	1–6	6	0–1
Blue Raiders rushing
	Car	Yds	TD
Frank Peasant	15	64	1
Mike DiLiello	4	44	1
Jaylin Lane	5	26	0
Martell Pettaway	7	13	0
Nick Vattiato	6	9	0
Brad Anderson	2	8	0
Amir Rasul	3	1	0
TEAM	2	−6	0
Blue Raiders receiving
	Rec	Yds	TD
Jarrin Pierce	4	114	1
Jaylin Lane	5	64	0
Yusuf Ali	9	39	1
JaMichael Thompson	1	18	0
Izaiah Gathings	1	17	0
CJ Windham	2	15	0
Amir Rasul	1	6	0
Brad Anderson	1	3	0

Toledo statistics
Rockets passing
	C–A	Yds	TD–INT
Dequan Finn	18–39	212	2–1
Rockets rushing
	Car	Yds	TD
Bryant Koback	18	126	0
Dequan Finn	12	83	1
DeMeer Blankumsee	1	15	0
Micah Kelly	1	11	0
Rockets receiving
	Rec	Yds	TD
Matt Landers	4	137	1
Isaiah Winstead	4	31	0
DeMeer Blankumsee	3	23	0
Thomas Zsiros	1	9	0
Danzel McKinley-Lewis	2	6	0
Devin Maddox	3	5	0
Bryant Koback	1	1	0
