= 2021 Famous Idaho Potato Bowl =

Postseason college football bowl game

- 25th Famous Idaho Potato Bowl
Kent State Golden Flashes	Wyoming Cowboys
(7–6)	(6–6)
MAC	MWC
38	52
Head coach: Sean Lewis	Head coach: Craig Bohl
	1	2	3	4	Total
Kent State	14	10	0	14	38
Wyoming	7	14	14	17	52
- Date: December 21, 2021
- Season: 2021
- Stadium: Albertsons Stadium
- Location: Boise, Idaho
- MVP: Levi Williams (QB, Wyoming)
- Favorite: Wyoming by 3
- Referee: Rodney Burnette (C-USA)
- Attendance: 10,217

United States TV coverage
- Network: ESPN; ESPN Radio
- Announcers: ESPN: Bill Roth (play-by-play), Kelly Stouffer (analyst), and Lauren Sisler (sideline); ESPN Radio: Kevin Winter (play-by-play) and Trevor Matich (analyst)

International TV coverage
- Network: ESPN Brazil
- Announcers: Renan do Couto (play-by-play) and Antony Curti (analyst)

The 2021 Famous Idaho Potato Bowl was a college football bowl game played on December 21, 2021, with kickoff at 3:30 p.m. EST (1:30 p.m. local MST) on ESPN. It was the 25th edition of the Famous Idaho Potato Bowl, and it featured the Kent State Golden Flashes of Mid-American Conference and the Wyoming Cowboys of the Mountain West Conference. It was one of the 2021–22 bowl games concluding the 2021 FBS football season. The game was sponsored by the Idaho Potato Commission.

== Teams ==
Consistent with conference tie-ins, the game will be played between teams from the Mid-American Conference (MAC) and the Mountain West Conference (MWC). Kent State made their first appearance in the Famous Idaho Potato Bowl while Wyoming made their second appearance and first since the 2017 edition. This was Kent State's 5th bowl game appearance in program history, following their win in the 2019 Frisco Bowl. This was Wyoming's 17th bowl game appearance in program history, following their win in the 2019 Arizona Bowl.

This was the first time that Kent State and Wyoming have ever played each other.

=== Kent State Golden Flashes ===
Kent State started the season with a blowout loss against Texas A&M 41–10. They would then bounce back against VMI before falling to Iowa. After a 37-16 loss against Maryland, Kent State would win five of their next seven games. A 38-0 victory over Akron would secure their bowl eligibility. In the last game of the regular season the Golden Flashes would face off with the Miami (OH) RedHawks for the MAC East Division. In a thrilling 48-47 overtime victory, Kent State secured a spot in the MAC Championship Game. In a rematch vs Northern Illinois, the Golden Flashes lost 41-23 giving them a 7-6 record coming into the game.

=== Wyoming Cowboys ===
Wyoming started the season hot at 4-0 with wins over Montana State, Northern Illinois, Ball State, and UConn. After that the Cowboys went on a four game skid losing to four conference opponents. They beat a conference team for the first team on the year after beating Colorado State 31-17. The Cowboys then lost to Boise State 23-13 before beating the Mountain West Conference Champion Utah State 44-17 to secure bowl eligibility. In the final game of the regular season, Wyoming lost to Hawaii 38-14. Wyoming entered the contest with a 6-6 overall record, and a 2-6 record in conference.

== Game summary ==
2021 Famous Idaho Potato Bowl

Quarter	1	2	3	4	Total
Kent State	14	10	0	14	38
Wyoming	7	14	14	17	52

at Albertsons Stadium • Boise, Idaho

- Date: Tuesday, December 21, 2021
- Game time: 3:30 p.m. EST (1:30 p.m. local MST)
- Game weather: Sunny • Temperature: 39 °F (4 °C) • Wind: 2 mph (3.2 km/h) SE
- Game attendance: 10,217
- TV announcers (ESPN): Bill Roth (play-by-play), Kelly Stouffer (analyst), and Lauren Sisler (sideline)
- Box score

Game information

First quarter

- 7:05 WYO – Levi Williams 5-yard run, John Hoyland kick good. Drive: 9 plays, 67 yards, 4:19. Wyoming 7–0
- 6:62 KSU – Dante Cephas 80-yard pass from Dustin Crum, Andrew Glass kick good. Drive: 1 play, 80 yards, 0:14. tied 7–7
- 0:54 KSU – Dustin Crum 12-yard run, Andrew Glass kick good. Drive: 11 plays, 71 yards, 3:49. Kent State 14–7

Second quarter

- 12:21 KSU – Andrew Glass 36-yard field goal. Drive: 6 plays, 49 yards, 2:28. Kent State 17–7
- 5:39 WYO – Levi Williams 50-yard run, John Hoyland kick good. Drive: 4 plays, 77 yards, 1:50. Kent State 17–14
- 1:42 WYO – Isaiah Neyor 42-yard pass from Levi Williams, John Hoyland kick good. Drive: 5 plays, 74 yards, 2:22. Wyoming 21–17
- 0:24 KSU – Ja'Shaun Poke 3-yard pass from Dustin Crum, Andrew Glass kick good. Drive: 6 plays, 75 yards, 1:18. Kent State 24–21

Third quarter

- 10:28 WYO – Levi Williams 27-yard run, John Hoyland kick good. Drive: 8 plays, 73 yards, 4:32. Wyoming 28–24
- 2:42 WYO – Xazavian Valladay 3-yard run, John Hoyland kick good. Drive: 9 plays, 76 yards, 4:34. Wyoming 35–24

Fourth quarter

- 12:49 WYO – Levi Williams 80-yard run, John Hoyland kick good. Drive: 1 play, 80 yards, 0:12. Wyoming 42–24
- 11:13 KSU – Hayden Junker 6-yard pass from Dustin Crum, Andrew Glass kick good. Drive: 4 plays, 71 yards, 1:36. Wyoming 42–31
- 7:29 WYO – John Hoyland 44-yard field goal. Drive: 7 plays, 43 yards, 3:44. Wyoming 45–31
- 3:11 WYO – Trey Smith 49-yard run, John Hoyland kick good. Drive: 2 plays, 62 yards, 0:52. Wyoming 52–31
- 2:54 KSU – Devontez Walker 73-yard pass from Dustin Crum, Andrew Glass kick good. Drive: 1 play, 73 yards, 0:17. Wyoming 52–38

=== Statistics ===
Statistics	KSU	WYO
First downs	27	22
Plays–yards	78–656	64–538
Rushes–yards	50–319	53–411
Passing yards	337	127
Passing: comp–att–int	18–28–0	9–11–0
Turnovers		
Time of possession	28:50	31:10

Team	Category	Player	Statistics
Kent State	Passing	Dustin Crum	17/27, 326 yards, 4 TD
Kent State	Rushing	Marquez Cooper	24 carries, 125 yards
Kent State	Receiving	Dante Cephas	4 receptions, 116 yards, TD
Wyoming	Passing	Levi Williams	9/11, 127 yards, TD
Wyoming	Rushing	Levi Williams	16 carries, 200 yards, 4 TD
Wyoming	Receiving	Isaiah Neyor	5 receptions, 87 yards, TD

== Aftermath ==
With the win, Wyoming concluded the season with a record of 7-6. With the loss, Kent State concluded the season with a record of 7-7. Wyoming won their first bowl game since the 2019 Arizona Bowl and improved their bowl record to 9-8. Kent State's overall bowl record dropped to 1-3. This was the first bowl loss for Kent State head coach Sean Lewis. After the game, Wyoming head coach Craig Bohl was dumped with a bucket of french fries to celebrate the victory.

10,217 people attended the game down from the last game that allowed fans from 13,611. Wyoming quarterback Levi Williams was named the games most valuable player. Following the game, days later Williams transferred to conference foe Utah State and Sean Chambers who also started for Wyoming during the season transferred to Montana State.
