= 2021 MAC Championship Game =

2021 Rocket Mortgage MAC Championship Game
- Conference Championship
Kent State Golden Flashes	Northern Illinois Huskies
(7–5)	(8–4)
23	41
Head coach: Sean Lewis	Head coach: Thomas Hammock
	1	2	3	4	Total
Kent State	0	0	10	13	23
Northern Illinois	10	7	7	17	41
- Date: December 4, 2021
- Season: 2021
- Stadium: Ford Field
- Location: Detroit, Michigan
- MVP: Offense: Jay Ducker (RB, Northern Illinois); Defense: C. J. Brown (DB, Northern Illinois); Special Teams: John Richardson (PK, Northern Illinois)
- Favorite: Kent State by 3.5
- Referee: Jeremy Valentine
- Attendance: 10,317

United States TV coverage
- Network: ESPN
- Announcers: Jason Benetti (play-by-play), Andre Ware (analyst) and Paul Carcaterra (sideline)

2021 Mid-American Conference football standings
	Conf.			Overall
Team	W		L	W		L
East Division
Kent State xy	6	–	2	7	–	7
Miami (OH)	5	–	3	7	–	6
Ohio	3	–	5	3	–	9
Bowling Green	2	–	6	4	–	8
Buffalo	2	–	6	4	–	8
Akron	1	–	7	2	–	10
West Division
Northern Illinois xy$	6	–	2	9	–	5
Central Michigan x	6	–	2	9	–	4
Toledo	5	–	3	7	–	6
Ball State	4	–	4	6	–	7
Eastern Michigan	4	–	4	7	–	6
Western Michigan	4	–	4	8	–	5
Championship: Northern Illinois 41, Kent State 23
$ – Conference champion; x – Division champion/co-champions; y – Championship game participant

The 2021 MAC Championship Game was a college football game played on December 4, 2021, at Ford Field in Detroit, Michigan. It was the 25th edition of the MAC Football Championship Game and determined the champion of the Mid-American Conference (MAC) for the 2021 season. The game began at 12:00 p.m. EST and aired on ESPN. The game featured the Northern Illinois Huskies, the Western Division champions, and the Kent State Golden Flashes, the Eastern Division champions. Sponsored by mortgage lending company Quicken Loans through their Rocket Mortgage brand, the game was officially known as the Rocket Mortgage MAC Championship Game.

== Teams ==
The 2021 MAC Championship Game will feature the Kent State Golden Flashes, champions of the East Division, and the Northern Illinois Huskies, champions of the West Division. This will be the teams' 30th all-time meeting; Northern Illinois enters the game leading the series 21–8. The teams first met in 1949, and have been Mid-American Conference opponents since 1975. The teams last met earlier in the season, with Kent State defeating Northern Illinois 52–47, to break a ten-game losing streak to the Huskies; prior to 2021, the teams last faced off in 2017, with Northern Illinois winning, 24–3.

=== Kent State ===
Kent State clinched a spot in the championship game following their win over Miami (OH). It marked their first Eastern Division title since 2012; Kent State is looking for their first MAC title since 1972.

=== Northern Illinois ===
Northern Illinois clinched a berth in the championship game following their win over Buffalo.

== Game summary ==
2021 Rocket Mortgage MAC Championship Game

Quarter	1	2	3	4	Total
Kent State	0	0	10	13	23
Northern Illinois	10	7	7	17	41

at Ford Field • Detroit, Michigan

- Date: December 4, 2021
- Game time: 12:00 p.m. EST
- Game weather: n/a (game played indoors)
- Game attendance: 10,317
- Referee: Jeremy Valentine
- TV announcers (ESPN): Jason Benetti (play-by-play), Andre Ware (analyst) and Paul Carcaterra (sideline)
- Box score

Scoring summary

Quarter	Time	Drive			Team	Scoring information	Score	
Quarter	Time	Plays	Yards	TOP	Team	Scoring information	Kent State	Northern Illinois
1	9:43	10	41	5:17	Northern Illinois	37-yard field goal by John Richardson	0	3
1	2:09	10	78	4:57	Northern Illinois	Clint Ratkovich 2-yard touchdown run, John Richardson kick good	0	10
2	8:33	15	81	7:52	Northern Illinois	Rocky Lombardi 1-yard touchdown run, John Richardson kick good	0	17
3	11:38	9	56	3:22	Kent State	41-yard field goal by Andrew Glass	3	17
3	3:55				Northern Illinois	Interception returned 26 yards for touchdown by CJ Brown, John Richardson kick good	3	24
3	0:27	9	75	3:28	Kent State	Nykeim Johnson 17-yard touchdown reception from Dustin Crum, Andrew Glass kick good	10	24
4	10:54	8	75	4:33	Northern Illinois	Rocky Lombardi 5-yard touchdown run, John Richardson kick good	10	31
4	6:55	5	21	2:48	Northern Illinois	Rocky Lombardi 2-yard touchdown run, John Richardson kick good	10	38
4	4:16	10	78	2:39	Kent State	Collin Schlee 4-yard touchdown run, Andrew Glass kick good	17	38
4	2:01	5	17	2:15	Northern Illinois	30-yard field goal by John Richardson	17	41
4	0:00	10	92	2:01	Kent State	Luke Floriea 17-yard touchdown reception from Collin Schlee, kick not attempted, time expired	23	41
"TOP" = time of possession. For other American football terms, see Glossary of American football.							23	41

=== Statistics ===
Statistics	KENT	NIU
First downs	24	28
Plays–yards	62–391	76–368
Rushes–yards	36–195	61–266
Passing yards	196	102
Passing: comp–att–int	16–26–2	7–15–1
Time of possession	19:59	40:01

Team	Category	Player	Statistics
Kent State	Passing	Dustin Crum	11/21, 128 yards, 1 TD, 2 INT
Kent State	Rushing	Xavier Williams	8 carries, 93 yards
Kent State	Receiving	Dante Cephas	7 receptions, 102 yards
Northern Illinois	Passing	Rocky Lombardi	7/15, 102 yards, 1 INT
Northern Illinois	Rushing	Jay Ducker	29 carries, 146 yards
Northern Illinois	Receiving	Trayvon Rudolph	3 receptions, 50 yards
