= 2021 Northern Illinois Huskies football team =

American college football season

2021 Northern Illinois Huskies football

MAC champion MAC West Division co-champion

MAC Championship Game, W 41–23 vs. Kent State

Cure Bowl, L 41–47 vs. Coastal Carolina
- Conference: Mid-American Conference
- West Division
- Record: 9–5 (6–2 MAC)
- Head coach: Thomas Hammock (3rd season)
- Offensive coordinator: Eric Eidsness (3rd season)
- Offensive scheme: Multiple
- Defensive coordinator: Derrick Jackson (3rd season)
- Base defense: 4–2–5
- Home stadium: Huskie Stadium

2021 Mid-American Conference football standings
	Conf.			Overall
Team	W		L	W		L
East Division
Kent State xy	6	–	2	7	–	7
Miami (OH)	5	–	3	7	–	6
Ohio	3	–	5	3	–	9
Bowling Green	2	–	6	4	–	8
Buffalo	2	–	6	4	–	8
Akron	1	–	7	2	–	10
West Division
Northern Illinois xy$	6	–	2	9	–	5
Central Michigan x	6	–	2	9	–	4
Toledo	5	–	3	7	–	6
Ball State	4	–	4	6	–	7
Eastern Michigan	4	–	4	7	–	6
Western Michigan	4	–	4	8	–	5
Championship: Northern Illinois 41, Kent State 23
$ – Conference champion; x – Division champion/co-champions; y – Championship game participant

The 2021 Northern Illinois Huskies football team represented Northern Illinois University as a member of the West Division of the Mid-American Conference (MAC) during the 2021 NCAA Division I FBS football season, led by third-year head coach Thomas Hammock. The team played home games at Huskie Stadium in DeKalb, Illinois.

The Huskies were coming off a winless (0-6) season shorted by the COVID-19 pandemic with one of the youngest teams in the nation. Expectations were low this season but the Huskies managed to compile an overall record of 9–5 with a mark of 6–2 in conference play, sharing the MAC's West Division title with Central Michigan after a win over Buffalo on November 17. By virtue of a head-to-head win over Central Michigan, Northern Illinois advanced to the MAC Championship Game and defeated Kent State in a regular season rematch to win the program's sixth MAC championship. The Huskies were invited to the Cure Bowl, where they lost to Coastal Carolina 41-47 on December 17.

On November 9, the school announced that Hammock had signed a contract extension through the 2026 season.

== Offseason ==
=== Transfers ===
As a result of the limited season in 2020 due to COVID-19, the NCAA granted a waiver to allow athletes to transfer to another school and be eligible immediately without having to sit out a season. In April 2021, the NCAA further made one-time transfers for all college athletes to be eligible immediately. As a result, transfers were much more common this year than in prior years.

Michigan State quarterback Rocky Lombardi, who started six games for the Spartans in 2020, announced he would transfer to Northern Illinois.

== Preseason ==
In the league's annual preseason poll, the Huskies were picked to finish in last place in the West.

== Schedule ==
The Huskies played Maine and Wyoming at home while traveling to Georgia Tech and Michigan for non-conference games in 2021.

Date	Time	Opponent	Site	TV	Result	Attendance
September 4	6:30 p.m.	at Georgia Tech*	Bobby Dodd Stadium; Atlanta, GA	ACCN	W 22–21	33,651
September 11	12:30 p.m.	Wyoming*	Huskie Stadium; DeKalb, IL	ESPN+	L 43–50	11,334
September 18	11:00 a.m.	at No. 25 Michigan*	Michigan Stadium; Ann Arbor, MI	BTN	L 10–63	106,263
September 25	1:30 p.m.	Maine*	Huskie Stadium; DeKalb, IL	ESPN3	W 41–14	10,076
October 2	1:30 p.m.	Eastern Michigan^{†}	Huskie Stadium; DeKalb, IL	ESPN+	W 27–20	10,034
October 9	11:00 a.m.	at Toledo	Glass Bowl; Toledo, OH	CBSSN	W 22–20	21,284
October 16	2:30 p.m.	Bowling Green	Huskie Stadium; DeKalb, IL	ESPN+	W 34–26	7,854
October 23	11:00 a.m.	at Central Michigan	Kelly/Shorts Stadium; Mount Pleasant, MI	ESPNU	W 39–38	15,232
November 3	6:00 p.m.	at Kent State	Dix Stadium; Kent, OH	ESPN2	L 47–52	6,076
November 10	6:00 p.m.	Ball State	Huskie Stadium; DeKalb, IL (Bronze Stalk Trophy)	ESPN2	W 30–29	7,894
November 17	6:00 p.m.	at Buffalo	University at Buffalo Stadium; Amherst, NY	ESPN2	W 33–27 ^{OT}	13,097
November 23	6:00 p.m.	Western Michigan	Huskie Stadium; DeKalb, IL	ESPNU	L 21–42	7,156
December 4	11:00 a.m.	vs. Kent State	Ford Field; Detroit, MI (MAC Championship Game)	ESPN	W 41–23	10,317
December 17	5:00 p.m.	vs. Coastal Carolina*	Exploria Stadium; Orlando, FL (Cure Bowl)	ESPN2	L 41–47	9,784
*Non-conference game; ^{†}Homecoming; Rankings from AP Poll and CFP Rankings (after November 3) released prior to game; All times are in Central time

== Rankings ==
Ranking movements Legend: ██ Increase in ranking ██ Decrease in ranking — = Not ranked RV = Received votes
	Week															
Poll	Pre	1	2	3	4	5	6	7	8	9	10	11	12	13	14	Final
AP	—	—	—	—	—	—	—	—	—	—	—	—	—	—	RV	
Coaches	—	—	—	—	—	—	—	—	—	—	—	—	—	—	—	
CFP	Not released									—	—	—	—	—	—	Not released

== Game summaries ==
=== At Georgia Tech ===
Northern Illinois Huskies (0–0) at Georgia Tech Yellow Jackets (0–0)

Quarter	1	2	3	4	Total
Northern Illinois	7	7	0	8	22
Georgia Tech	0	7	0	14	21

at Bobby Dodd Stadium • Atlanta, GA

- Date: Saturday, September 4, 2021
- Game time: 6:30 p.m. CDT
- Game weather: sunny • Temperature: 78°F
- Game attendance: 33,651
- Referee: Marcus Woods
- TV announcers (ACCN): Dave O'Brien, Tim Hasselbeck, Kelsey Riggs

Game information

First Quarter

- (1:56) NIU – Harrison Waylee 35 yard rush, John Richardson kick (Drive: 8 plays, 74 yards, 3:42; NIU 7–0)

Second Quarter

- (10:17) NIU – Miles Joiner 5 yard pass from Rocky Lombardi, John Richardson kick (Drive: 12 plays, 66 yards, 5:22; NIU 14–0)
- (0:47) GT – Kyric McGowan 22 yard pass from Jordan Yates, Brent Cimaglia kick (Drive: 17 plays, 97 yards, 6:00; NIU 14–7)

Fourth Quarter

- (7:44) GT – Dontae Smith 15 yard rush, Brent Cimaglia kick (Drive: 5 plays, 77 yards, 2:23; 14–14)
- (6:32) GT – Jordan Yates 4 yard rush, Brent Cimaglia kick (Drive: 3 plays, 25 yards, 0:54; GT 21–14)
- (0:38) NIU – Clint Ratkovich 3 yards pass from Rocky Lombardi, Tyrice Richie pass from Rocky Lombardi (Drive: 9 plays, 80 yards, 2:04; NIU 22–21)

Statistics	NIU	GT
First downs	15	25
Total yards	301	429
Rushes/yards	42/165	52/273
Passing yards	136	156
Passing: Comp–Att–Int	11–17–0	15–26–0
Time of possession	28:55	31:05

Team	Category	Player	Statistics
Northern Illinois	Passing	Rocky Lombardi	11–17, 136 yards, 2 TD
Northern Illinois	Rushing	Harrison Waylee	27 carries, 144 yards, 1 TD
Northern Illinois	Receiving	Tyrice Richie	2 receptions, 64 yards
Georgia Tech	Passing	Jordan Yates	12–18, 135 yards, 1 TD
Georgia Tech	Rushing	Jahmyr Gibbs	20 carries, 99 yards
Georgia Tech	Receiving	Malachi Carter	6 receptions, 92 yards

=== At Central Michigan ===
Northern Illinois at Central Michigan

Team	1	2	3	4	Total
• Northern Illinois	7	11	11	10	39
Central Michigan	14	14	7	3	38

- Date: October 23, 2021
- Location: Kelly/Shorts Stadium
  Mount Pleasant, MI
- Game start: 12:00 p.m. EST
- Game attendance: 15,232
- Television network: ESPNU

Statistics	Northern Illinois	Central Michigan
First downs	25	25
Total yards	548	500
Rushing yards	197	189
Passing yards	351	311
Turnovers	0	1
Time of possession	36:09	23:51

Team	Category	Player	Statistics
Northern Illinois	Passing	Rocky Lombardi	17/27, 348 yards, 3 TDs
Northern Illinois	Rushing	Jay Ducker	31 carries, 183 yards
Northern Illinois	Receiving	Trayvon Rudolph	6 receptions, 160 yards, 2 TDs
Central Michigan	Passing	Daniel Richardson	23/36, 289 yards, 3 TDs
Central Michigan	Rushing	Lew Nichols III	22 carries, 192 yards, 2 TDs
Central Michigan	Receiving	Kalil Pimpleton	6 receptions, 130 yards, 1 TD

=== At Kent State ===
Northern Illinois at Kent State

Team	1	2	3	4	Total
Northern Illinois	7	14	6	20	47
• Kent State	0	31	14	7	52

- Date: November 3, 2021
- Location: Dix Stadium
  Kent, OH
- Game start: 7:00 p.m. EST
- Game attendance: 6,076
- Television network: ESPN2

Statistics	Northern Illinois	Kent State
First downs	32	31
Total yards	663	682
Rushing yards	131	360
Passing yards	532	322
Turnovers	1	0
Time of possession	35:04	24:56

Team	Category	Player	Statistics
Northern Illinois	Passing	Rocky Lombardi	33/57, 532 yards, 3 TDs
Northern Illinois	Rushing	Jay Ducker	19 carries, 101 yards, 2 TDs
Northern Illinois	Receiving	Trayvon Rudolph	14 receptions, 309 yards, 3 TDs
Kent State	Passing	Dustin Crum	20/30, 322 yards, 2 TDs
Kent State	Rushing	Marquez Cooper	23 carries, 173 yards, 2 TDs
Kent State	Receiving	Dante Cephas	5 receptions, 124 yards

=== Ball State (Bronze Stalk Trophy) ===
Bronze Stalk Trophy

Team	1	2	3	4	Total
Ball State	10	7	9	3	29
• Northern Illinois	0	17	3	10	30

- Date: November 10, 2021
- Location: Huskie Stadium
  DeKalb, IL
- Game start: 7:00 p.m. EST
- Game attendance: 7,894
- Television network: ESPN2

Statistics	Ball State	Northern Illinois
First downs	17	26
Total yards	372	475
Rushing yards	246	211
Passing yards	126	264
Turnovers	0	2
Time of possession	23:16	36:44

Team	Category	Player	Statistics
Ball State	Passing	Drew Plitt	11/26, 126 yards, 1 TD
Ball State	Rushing	Carson Steele	21 carries, 109 yards
Ball State	Receiving	Jalen McGaughy	1 reception, 45 yards
Northern Illinois	Passing	Rocky Lombardi	23/38, 264 yards, 1 TD, 1 INT
Northern Illinois	Rushing	Jay Ducker	24 carries, 155 yards, 1 TD
Northern Illinois	Receiving	Trayvon Rudolph	8 receptions, 108 yards

=== Vs. Kent State (MAC Championship game) ===
MAC Championship Game

Team	1	2	3	4	Total
Kent State	0	0	10	13	23
• Northern Illinois	10	7	7	17	41

- Date: December 4, 2021
- Location: Ford Field
  Detroit, MI
- Game start: 12:00 p.m. EST
- Game attendance: 10,317
- Television network: ESPN

Statistics	Kent State	Northern Illinois
First downs	24	28
Total yards	391	368
Rushing yards	195	266
Passing yards	196	102
Turnovers	2	1
Time of possession	19:59	40:01

Team	Category	Player	Statistics
Kent State	Passing	Dustin Crum	11/21, 128 yards, 1 TD, 2 INTs
Kent State	Rushing	Xavier Williams	8 carries, 93 yards
Kent State	Receiving	Dante Cephas	7 receptions, 102 yards
Northern Illinois	Passing	Rocky Lombardi	7/15, 102 yards, 1 INT
Northern Illinois	Rushing	Jay Ducker	29 carries, 146 yards
Northern Illinois	Receiving	Trayvon Rudolph	3 receptions, 50 yards
