= 2021 Toledo Rockets football team =

American college football season

2021 Toledo Rockets football

Bahamas Bowl, L 24–31 vs. Middle Tennessee
- Conference: Mid-American Conference
- West Division
- Record: 7–6 (5–3 MAC)
- Head coach: Jason Candle (6th season)
- Co-offensive coordinators: Mike Hallett (2nd season); Robert Weiner (2nd season)
- Offensive scheme: Spread
- Defensive coordinator: Vince Kehres (2nd season)
- Co-defensive coordinators: Ross Watson (2nd season); Craig Kuligowski (2nd season)
- Base defense: 4–2–5
- Home stadium: Glass Bowl

2021 Mid-American Conference football standings
	Conf.			Overall
Team	W		L	W		L
East Division
Kent State xy	6	–	2	7	–	7
Miami (OH)	5	–	3	7	–	6
Ohio	3	–	5	3	–	9
Bowling Green	2	–	6	4	–	8
Buffalo	2	–	6	4	–	8
Akron	1	–	7	2	–	10
West Division
Northern Illinois xy$	6	–	2	9	–	5
Central Michigan x	6	–	2	9	–	4
Toledo	5	–	3	7	–	6
Ball State	4	–	4	6	–	7
Eastern Michigan	4	–	4	7	–	6
Western Michigan	4	–	4	8	–	5
Championship: Northern Illinois 41, Kent State 23
$ – Conference champion; x – Division champion/co-champions; y – Championship game participant

The 2021 Toledo Rockets football team represented the University of Toledo during the 2021 NCAA Division I FBS football season. The Rockets were led by sixth-year head coach Jason Candle and played their home games at the Glass Bowl in Toledo, Ohio. They competed as members of the West Division of the Mid-American Conference (MAC).

== Schedule ==
Date	Time	Opponent	Site	TV	Result	Attendance
September 4	7:00 p.m.	Norfolk State*	Glass Bowl; Toledo, OH	ESPN3	W 49–10	21,783
September 11	2:30 p.m.	at No. 8 Notre Dame*	Notre Dame Stadium; Notre Dame, IN	Peacock	L 29–32	62,009
September 18	4:00 p.m.	Colorado State*	Glass Bowl; Toledo, OH	ESPNU	L 6–22	21,365
September 25	2:00 p.m.	at Ball State	Scheumann Stadium; Muncie, IN	ESPN+	W 22–12	14,902
October 2	12:00 p.m.	at UMass*	Warren McGuirk Alumni Stadium; Hadley, MA	NESN+	W 45–7	9,456
October 9	12:00 p.m.	Northern Illinois^{†}	Glass Bowl; Toledo, OH	CBSSN	L 20–22	21,284
October 16	3:30 p.m.	at Central Michigan	Kelly/Shorts Stadium; Mount Pleasant, MI	CBSSN	L 23–26 ^{OT}	20,112
October 23	3:30 p.m.	Western Michigan	Glass Bowl; Toledo, OH	CBSSN	W 34–15	19,906
November 2	7:30 p.m.	Eastern Michigan	Glass Bowl; Toledo, OH	ESPN2	L 49–52	14,997
November 10	7:00 p.m.	at Bowling Green	Doyt Perry Stadium; Bowling Green, OH (Battle of I-75)	CBSSN	W 49–17	18,349
November 16	7:00 p.m.	at Ohio	Peden Stadium; Athens, OH	ESPN+	W 35–23	9,716
November 27	12:00 p.m.	Akron	Glass Bowl; Toledo, OH	ESPN+	W 49–14	11,282
December 17	12:00 p.m.	vs. Middle Tennessee*	Thomas Robinson Stadium; Nassau, Bahamas (Bahamas Bowl)	ESPN	L 24–31	13,596
*Non-conference game; ^{†}Homecoming; Rankings from AP Poll released prior to the game; All times are in Eastern time

== After the season ==
=== NFL draft ===
The following Rockets were selected in the 2022 NFL draft following the season.

Round	Pick	Player	Position	NFL club
5	166	Tycen Anderson	Defensive back	Cincinnati Bengals
5	172	Samuel Womack	Defensive back	San Francisco 49ers
