= 2021 Kent State Golden Flashes football team =

American college football season

2021 Kent State Golden Flashes football

MAC East Division champion

MAC Championship Game, L 23–41 vs. Northern Illinois

Famous Idaho Potato Bowl, L 38–52 vs. Wyoming
- Conference: Mid-American Conference
- East Division
- Record: 7–7 (6–2 MAC)
- Head coach: Sean Lewis (4th season)
- Offensive coordinator: Andrew Sowder (4th season)
- Offensive scheme: Veer and shoot
- Defensive coordinator: Tom Kaufman (4th season)
- Base defense: 3–4
- Home stadium: Dix Stadium

2021 Mid-American Conference football standings
| | Conf. | | | Overall |
| Team | W | | L | W | | L |
|---|---|---|---|---|---|---|
East Division
| Kent State xy | 6 | – | 2 | 7 | – | 7 |
| Miami (OH) | 5 | – | 3 | 7 | – | 6 |
| Ohio | 3 | – | 5 | 3 | – | 9 |
| Bowling Green | 2 | – | 6 | 4 | – | 8 |
| Buffalo | 2 | – | 6 | 4 | – | 8 |
| Akron | 1 | – | 7 | 2 | – | 10 |
West Division
| Northern Illinois xy$ | 6 | – | 2 | 9 | – | 5 |
| Central Michigan x | 6 | – | 2 | 9 | – | 4 |
| Toledo | 5 | – | 3 | 7 | – | 6 |
| Ball State | 4 | – | 4 | 6 | – | 7 |
| Eastern Michigan | 4 | – | 4 | 7 | – | 6 |
| Western Michigan | 4 | – | 4 | 8 | – | 5 |
Championship: Northern Illinois 41, Kent State 23
$ – Conference champion; x – Division champion/co-champions; y – Championship game participant

The 2021 Kent State Golden Flashes football team represented Kent State University in the 2021 NCAA Division I FBS football season. They were led by fourth-year head coach Sean Lewis and played their home games at Dix Stadium in Kent, Ohio, as members of the East Division of the Mid-American Conference (MAC).

The Golden Flashes finished the regular season with an overall record of 7–5, going 6–2 in conference play to finish first in the MAC's East Division. In the MAC Championship Game, Kent State faced off against Northern Illinois in a rematch of a regular season game; the Golden Flashes would lose the championship game 23–41. Kent State was then selected for the Famous Idaho Potato Bowl, losing to Wyoming 38–52 to finish the season with an overall record of 7–7. To date, this is the last season the Golden Flashes finished with a non-losing record.

== Preseason ==
=== MAC prediction poll ===
The MAC released its preseason prediction poll on July 20, 2021. The Golden Flashes were predicted to finish first in the conference's East Division with 112 points, along with 11 out of 22 first place votes.

== Schedule ==
| Date | Time | Opponent | Site | TV | Result | Attendance |
|---|---|---|---|---|---|---|
| September 4 | 8:00 p.m. | at No. 6 Texas A&M* | Kyle Field; College Station, TX | ESPNU | L 10–41 | 97,339 |
| September 11 | 11:30 a.m. | No. 18 (FCS) VMI* | Dix Stadium; Kent, OH | ESPN3 | W 60–10 | 16,785 |
| September 18 | 3:30 p.m. | at No. 5 Iowa* | Kinnick Stadium; Iowa City, IA | BTN | L 7–30 | 61,932 |
| September 25 | 3:30 p.m. | at Maryland* | Maryland Stadium; College Park, MD | BTN | L 16–37 | 30,117 |
| October 2 | 3:30 p.m. | Bowling Green | Dix Stadium; Kent, OH (Anniversary Award) | ESPN+ | W 27–20 | 20,537 |
| October 9 | 7:00 p.m. | Buffalo | Dix Stadium; Kent, OH | ESPNU | W 48–38 | 12,105 |
| October 16 | 3:30 p.m. | at Western Michigan | Waldo Stadium; Kalamazoo, MI | ESPNU | L 31–64 | 18,716 |
| October 23 | 1:00 p.m. | at Ohio | Peden Stadium; Athens, OH | ESPN+ | W 34–27 | 15,854 |
| November 3 | 7:00 p.m. | Northern Illinois | Dix Stadium; Kent, OH | ESPN2 | W 52–47 | 6,076 |
| November 10 | 8:00 p.m. | at Central Michigan | Kelly/Shorts Stadium; Mount Pleasant, MI | ESPNU | L 30–54 | 9,213 |
| November 20 | 12:00 p.m. | at Akron | InfoCision Stadium–Summa Field; Akron, OH (Wagon Wheel) | ESPN+ | W 38–0 | 8,879 |
| November 27 | 12:00 p.m. | Miami (OH) | Dix Stadium; Kent, OH | ESPN+ | W 48–47 ^{OT} | 8,387 |
| December 4 | 12:00 p.m. | vs. Northern Illinois | Ford Field; Detroit, MI (MAC Championship Game) | ESPN | L 23–41 | 10,317 |
| December 21 | 3:30 p.m. | vs. Wyoming* | Albertsons Stadium; Boise, ID (Famous Idaho Potato Bowl) | ESPN | L 38–52 | 10,217 |
*Non-conference game; Rankings from AP Poll released prior to the game; All times are in Eastern time

== Game summaries ==
=== At No. 6 Texas A&M ===
Kent State at Texas A&M

| Team | 1 | 2 | 3 | 4 | Total |
|---|---|---|---|---|---|
| Golden Flashes | 3 | 0 | 0 | 7 | 10 |
| • No. 6 Aggies | 10 | 0 | 17 | 14 | 41 |

- Date: September 4
- Location: Kyle Field
  College Station, Texas
- Game start: 8:00 p.m. EST
- Game attendance: 97,339
- Game weather: Temperature: 95 °F (35 °C) • Weather: Sunny • Wind: S 3 MPH
- Referee: Marc Curles
- TV announcers (ESPNU): Dave Neal (play-by-play), Tom Ramsey (analyst) and Andraya Carter (sideline)

| Statistics | KENT | TAMU |
|---|---|---|
| First downs | 19 | 29 |
| Total yards | 336 | 595 |
| Rushing yards | 226 | 303 |
| Passing yards | 110 | 292 |
| Turnovers | 2 | 5 |
| Time of possession | 24:50 | 35:10 |

| Team | Category | Player | Statistics |
|---|---|---|---|
| Kent State | Passing | Dustin Crum | 12/26, 89 yards, 2 INT |
| Kent State | Rushing | Xavier Williams | 8 rushes, 73 yards |
| Kent State | Receiving | Keshunn Abram | 3 receptions, 24 yards |
| Texas A&M | Passing | Haynes King | 21/33, 292 yards, 2 TD, 3 INT |
| Texas A&M | Rushing | De’Von Achane | 12 rushes, 124 yards, 2 TD |
| Texas A&M | Receiving | Ainias Smith | 8 receptions, 100 yards, 2 TD |

=== VMI ===
VMI at Kent State

| Team | 1 | 2 | 3 | 4 | Total |
|---|---|---|---|---|---|
| Keydets | 0 | 0 | 3 | 7 | 10 |
| • Golden Flashes | 22 | 17 | 14 | 7 | 60 |

- Date: September 11
- Location: Dix Stadium
  Kent, Ohio
- Game start: 11:30 a.m. EST
- Game attendance: 25,319
- Television network: ESPN3

| Statistics | VMI | KENT |
|---|---|---|
| First downs | 19 | 31 |
| Total yards | 288 | 698 |
| Rushing yards | 142 | 494 |
| Passing yards | 146 | 204 |
| Turnovers | 4 | 0 |
| Time of possession | 28:13 | 31:47 |

| Team | Category | Player | Statistics |
|---|---|---|---|
| VMI | Passing | Collin Ironside | 7/12, 91 yards, INT |
| VMI | Rushing | Rashad Raymond | 12 carries, 57 yards |
| VMI | Receiving | Julio DaSilva | 2 receptions, 37 yards |
| Kent State | Passing | Dustin Crum | 12/17, 180 yards, TD |
| Kent State | Rushing | Marquez Cooper | 12 carries, 119 yards, TD |
| Kent State | Receiving | Nykeim Johnson | 5 receptions, 55 yards, TD |

=== At No. 5 Iowa ===
Kent State at Iowa

| Team | 1 | 2 | 3 | 4 | Total |
|---|---|---|---|---|---|
| Golden Flashes | 7 | 0 | 0 | 0 | 7 |
| • No. 5 Hawkeyes | 9 | 7 | 7 | 7 | 30 |

- Date: September 18
- Location: Kinnick Stadium
  Iowa City, Iowa
- Game start: 3:30 p.m. EST
- Elapsed time: 3:04
- Game attendance: 61,932
- Game weather: 82 °F (28 °C), Sunny, Wind SE 4 mph (6.4 km/h)
- Referee: Larry Smith
- TV announcers (BTN): Mark Followill (play-by-play), Anthony Herron (analyst) & Coley Harvey (sideline)

Scoring summary
| 1 | 8:03 | Iowa | Safety, Dustin Crum sacked by Lukas Van Ness in end zone | Iowa 2–0 |
| 1 | 6:34 | Iowa | Tyler Goodson 46-yard run (Caleb Shudak kick) | Iowa 9–0 |
| 1 | 5:00 | Kent | Keshunn Abram 23-yard pass from Dustin Crum (A. Glass kick) | Iowa 9–7 |
| 2 | 0:19 | Iowa | Sam LaPorta 5-yard pass from Spencer Petras (Caleb Shudak kick) | Iowa 16–7 |
| 3 | 0:32 | Iowa | Tyler Goodson 35-yard run (Caleb Shudak kick) (Caleb Shudak kick) | Iowa 23–7 |
| 4 | 4:07 | Iowa | Tyler Goodson 2-yard run (Caleb Shudak kick) (Caleb Shudak kick) | Iowa 30–7 |

| Statistics | KENT | Iowa |
|---|---|---|
| First downs | 17 | 21 |
| Total yards | 264 | 418 |
| Rushing yards | 79 | 206 |
| Passing yards | 185 | 212 |
| Turnovers | 1 | 1 |
| Time of possession | 23:52 | 36:08 |

| Team | Category | Player | Statistics |
|---|---|---|---|
| Kent State | Passing | Dustin Crum | 16/23, 185 yards, TD |
| Kent State | Rushing | Marquez Cooper | 10 carries, 38 yards |
| Kent State | Receiving | Keshunn Abram | 6 receptions, 138 yards, TD |
| Iowa | Passing | Spencer Petras | 25/36, 209 yards, TD |
| Iowa | Rushing | Tyler Goodson | 22 carries, 153 yards, 3 TD |
| Iowa | Receiving | Sam LaPorta | 7 receptions, 65 yards, TD |

=== At Maryland ===
Kent State at Maryland

| Team | 1 | 2 | 3 | 4 | Total |
|---|---|---|---|---|---|
| Golden Flashes | 6 | 3 | 0 | 7 | 16 |
| • Terrapins | 7 | 17 | 13 | 0 | 37 |

- Date: September 25
- Location: Maryland Stadium
  College Park, Maryland
- Game start: 3:30 p.m. EST
- Game attendance: 30,117
- Television network: BTN

| Statistics | KENT | MD |
|---|---|---|
| First downs | 27 | 23 |
| Total yards | 458 | 526 |
| Rushing yards | 150 | 142 |
| Passing yards | 308 | 384 |
| Turnovers | 1 | 2 |
| Time of possession | 30:04 | 29:56 |

| Team | Category | Player | Statistics |
|---|---|---|---|
| Kent State | Passing | Dustin Crum | 19/33, 308 yards, TD |
| Kent State | Rushing | Marquez Cooper | 13 carries, 48 yards |
| Kent State | Receiving | Dante Cephas | 10 receptions, 151 yards, TD |
| Maryland | Passing | Taulia Tagovailoa | 31/41, 384 yards, 3 TD, INT |
| Maryland | Rushing | Tayon Fleet-Davis | 7 carries, 60 yards, 2 TD |
| Maryland | Receiving | Dontay Demus Jr. | 4 receptions, 108 yards, TD |

=== Bowling Green ===
Anniversary Award

| Team | 1 | 2 | 3 | 4 | Total |
|---|---|---|---|---|---|
| Falcons | 3 | 3 | 14 | 0 | 20 |
| • Golden Flashes | 10 | 3 | 7 | 7 | 27 |

- Date: October 2
- Location: Dix Stadium
  Kent, Ohio
- Game start: 3:30 p.m. EST
- Game attendance: 20,537
- Television network: ESPN+

| Statistics | BGSU | KENT |
|---|---|---|
| First downs | 18 | 25 |
| Total yards | 318 | 396 |
| Rushing yards | 55 | 262 |
| Passing yards | 263 | 134 |
| Turnovers | 2 | 0 |
| Time of possession | 32:15 | 27:45 |

| Team | Category | Player | Statistics |
|---|---|---|---|
| Bowling Green | Passing | Matt McDonald | 29/45, 263 yards, TD, INT |
| Bowling Green | Rushing | Jaison Patterson | 12 carries, 60 yards |
| Bowling Green | Receiving | Tyrone Broden | 5 receptions, 75 yards, TD |
| Kent State | Passing | Dustin Crum | 15/28, 134 yards |
| Kent State | Rushing | Marquez Cooper | 31 carries, 120 yards, 2 TD |
| Kent State | Receiving | Dante Cephas | 6 receptions, 64 yards |

=== Buffalo ===
Buffalo at Kent State

| Team | 1 | 2 | 3 | 4 | Total |
|---|---|---|---|---|---|
| Bulls | 0 | 10 | 28 | 0 | 38 |
| • Golden Flashes | 14 | 17 | 3 | 14 | 48 |

- Date: October 2
- Location: Dix Stadium
  Kent, Ohio
- Game start: 7:00 p.m. EST
- Game attendance: 12,105
- Television network: ESPNU

| Statistics | BUFF | KENT |
|---|---|---|
| First downs | 36 | 33 |
| Total yards | 549 | 633 |
| Rushing yards | 312 | 226 |
| Passing yards | 237 | 407 |
| Turnovers | 2 | 0 |
| Time of possession | 36:22 | 23:38 |

| Team | Category | Player | Statistics |
|---|---|---|---|
| Buffalo | Passing | Kyle Vantrease | 24/45, 237 yards, TD, 2 INT |
| Buffalo | Rushing | Dylan McDuffie | 10 carries, 87 yards, TD |
| Buffalo | Receiving | Quian Williams | 8 receptions, 86 yards |
| Kent State | Passing | Dustin Crum | 22/36, 407 yards, 3 TD |
| Kent State | Rushing | Marquez Cooper | 21 carries, 112 yards, TD |
| Kent State | Receiving | Dante Cephas | 13 receptions, 186 yards, 3 TD |

=== At Western Michigan ===
Kent State at Western Michigan

| Team | 1 | 2 | 3 | 4 | Total |
|---|---|---|---|---|---|
| Golden Flashes | 7 | 10 | 6 | 8 | 31 |
| • Broncos | 17 | 6 | 27 | 14 | 64 |

- Date: October 16
- Location: Waldo Stadium
  Kalamazoo, Michigan
- Game start: 3:30 p.m. EST
- Game attendance: 18,716
- Television network: ESPNU

| Statistics | KENT | WMU |
|---|---|---|
| First downs | 20 | 32 |
| Total yards | 362 | 648 |
| Rushing yards | 124 | 341 |
| Passing yards | 238 | 307 |
| Turnovers | 1 | 0 |
| Time of possession | 22:19 | 37:41 |

| Team | Category | Player | Statistics |
|---|---|---|---|
| Kent State | Passing | Dustin Crum | 15/26, 210 yards, 2 TD |
| Kent State | Rushing | Xavier Williams | 4 carries, 39 yards |
| Kent State | Receiving | Dante Cephas | 5 receptions, 96 yards, TD |
| Western Michigan | Passing | Kaleb Eleby | 15/22, 307 yards, 3 TD |
| Western Michigan | Rushing | Sean Tyler | 17 carries, 169 yards, TD |
| Western Michigan | Receiving | Jaylen Hall | 5 receptions, 144 yards, TD |

=== At Ohio ===
Kent State at Ohio

| Team | 1 | 2 | 3 | 4 | Total |
|---|---|---|---|---|---|
| • Golden Flashes | 10 | 7 | 14 | 3 | 34 |
| Bobcats | 0 | 7 | 10 | 10 | 27 |

- Date: October 23
- Location: Peden Stadium
  Athens, Ohio
- Game start: 1:00 p.m. EST
- Game attendance: 15,854
- Television network: ESPN+

| Statistics | KENT | OHIO |
|---|---|---|
| First downs | 28 | 27 |
| Total yards | 457 | 457 |
| Rushing yards | 200 | 135 |
| Passing yards | 257 | 322 |
| Turnovers | 0 | 3 |
| Time of possession | 26:37 | 33:23 |

| Team | Category | Player | Statistics |
|---|---|---|---|
| Kent State | Passing | Dustin Crum | 26/31, 257 yards, TD |
| Kent State | Rushing | Dustin Crum | 17 carries, 93 yards, TD |
| Kent State | Receiving | Dante Cephas | 9 receptions, 103 yards, TD |
| Ohio | Passing | Kurtis Rourke | 31/38, 308 yards, INT |
| Ohio | Rushing | De'Montre Tuggle | 13 carries, 59 yards, TD |
| Ohio | Receiving | Isiah Cox | 7 receptions, 73 yards |

=== Northern Illinois ===
Northern Illinois at Kent State

| Team | 1 | 2 | 3 | 4 | Total |
|---|---|---|---|---|---|
| Huskies | 7 | 14 | 6 | 20 | 47 |
| • Golden Flashes | 0 | 31 | 14 | 7 | 52 |

- Date: November 3
- Location: Dix Stadium
  Kent, Ohio
- Game start: 7:00 p.m. EST
- Game attendance: 6,076
- Television network: ESPN2

| Statistics | NIU | KENT |
|---|---|---|
| First downs | 32 | 31 |
| Total yards | 663 | 682 |
| Rushing yards | 131 | 360 |
| Passing yards | 532 | 322 |
| Turnovers | 1 | 0 |
| Time of possession | 35:04 | 24:56 |

| Team | Category | Player | Statistics |
|---|---|---|---|
| Northern Illinois | Passing | Rocky Lombardi | 33/57, 532 yards, 3 TD |
| Northern Illinois | Rushing | Jay Ducker | 19 carries, 101 yards, 2 TD |
| Northern Illinois | Receiving | Trayvon Rudolph | 14 receptions, 309 yards, 3 TD |
| Kent State | Passing | Dustin Crum | 20/30, 322 yards, 2 TD |
| Kent State | Rushing | Marquez Cooper | 23 carries, 173 yards, 2 TD |
| Kent State | Receiving | Dante Cephas | 5 receptions, 124 yards |

=== At Central Michigan ===
Kent State at Central Michigan

| Team | 1 | 2 | 3 | 4 | Total |
|---|---|---|---|---|---|
| Golden Flashes | 14 | 3 | 13 | 0 | 30 |
| • Central Michigan | 0 | 26 | 14 | 14 | 54 |

- Date: November 10
- Location: Kelly/Shorts Stadium
  Mount Pleasant, Michigan
- Game start: 8:00 p.m. EST
- Game attendance: 9,213
- Television network: ESPNU

| Statistics | KENT | CMU |
|---|---|---|
| First downs | 23 | 33 |
| Total yards | 456 | 505 |
| Rushing yards | 134 | 221 |
| Passing yards | 322 | 284 |
| Turnovers | 3 | 0 |
| Time of possession | 23:03 | 36:57 |

| Team | Category | Player | Statistics |
|---|---|---|---|
| Kent State | Passing | Dustin Crum | 28/38, 322 yards, 2 TD |
| Kent State | Rushing | Marquez Cooper | 21 carries, 83 yards, 2 TD |
| Kent State | Receiving | Dante Cephas | 5 receptions, 100 yards, TD |
| Central Michigan | Passing | Daniel Richardson | 21/27, 268 yards, 4 TD |
| Central Michigan | Rushing | Lew Nichols III | 43 carries, 215 yards, 4 TD |
| Central Michigan | Receiving | JaCorey Sullivan | 5 receptions, 61 yards |

=== At Akron ===
Wagon Wheel Trophy

| Team | 1 | 2 | 3 | 4 | Total |
|---|---|---|---|---|---|
| • Golden Flashes | 7 | 22 | 3 | 6 | 38 |
| Zips | 0 | 0 | 0 | 0 | 0 |

- Date: November 20
- Location: InfoCision Stadium
  Akron, Ohio
- Game start: 12:00 p.m. EST
- Game attendance: 8,879
- Television network: ESPN+

| Statistics | KENT | AKR |
|---|---|---|
| First downs | 23 | 11 |
| Total yards | 476 | 188 |
| Rushing yards | 410 | 77 |
| Passing yards | 66 | 111 |
| Turnovers | 0 | 2 |
| Time of possession | 31:59 | 28:01 |

| Team | Category | Player | Statistics |
|---|---|---|---|
| Kent State | Passing | Dustin Crum | 8/13, 55 yards |
| Kent State | Rushing | Marquez Cooper | 25 carries, 135 yards, TD |
| Kent State | Receiving | Dante Cephas | 2 receptions, 36 yards |
| Akron | Passing | Zach Gibson | 14/21, 111 yards |
| Akron | Rushing | Jonzell Norrils | 16 carries, 50 yards |
| Akron | Receiving | Konata Mumpfield | 4 receptions, 39 yards |

=== Miami (OH) ===
Miami (OH) at Kent State

| Team | 1 | 2 | 3 | 4 | OT | Total |
|---|---|---|---|---|---|---|
| RedHawks | 6 | 10 | 7 | 18 | 6 | 47 |
| • Golden Flashes | 7 | 10 | 14 | 10 | 7 | 48 |

- Date: November 27
- Location: Dix Stadium
  Kent, Ohio
- Game start: 12:00 p.m. EST
- Game attendance: 8,387
- Television network: ESPN+

| Statistics | MOH | KENT |
|---|---|---|
| First downs | 31 | 32 |
| Total yards | 549 | 642 |
| Rushing yards | 144 | 303 |
| Passing yards | 405 | 339 |
| Turnovers | 2 | 2 |
| Time of possession | 28:58 | 31:02 |

| Team | Category | Player | Statistics |
|---|---|---|---|
| Miami | Passing | Brett Gabbert | 26/51, 405 yards, 4 TD, 2 INT |
| Miami | Rushing | Kevin Davis | 10 carries, 56 yards |
| Miami | Receiving | Kenny Tracy | 5 receptions, 104 yards, TD |
| Kent State | Passing | Dustin Crum | 24/33, 325 yards, 2 TD, 2 INT |
| Kent State | Rushing | Xavier Williams | 13 carries, 168 yards, 2 TD |
| Kent State | Receiving | Keshunn Abram | 7 receptions, 138 yards, TD |

=== Vs. Northern Illinois (MAC Championship game) ===
MAC Championship Game

| Team | 1 | 2 | 3 | 4 | Total |
|---|---|---|---|---|---|
| Golden Flashes | 0 | 0 | 10 | 13 | 23 |
| • Huskies | 10 | 7 | 7 | 17 | 41 |

- Date: December 4
- Location: Ford Field
  Detroit, Michigan
- Game start: 12:00 p.m. EST
- Game attendance: 10,317
- Television network: ESPN

| Statistics | KENT | NIU |
|---|---|---|
| First downs | 24 | 28 |
| Total yards | 391 | 368 |
| Rushing yards | 195 | 266 |
| Passing yards | 196 | 102 |
| Turnovers | 2 | 1 |
| Time of possession | 19:59 | 40:01 |

| Team | Category | Player | Statistics |
|---|---|---|---|
| Kent State | Passing | Dustin Crum | 11/21, 128 yards, TD, 2 INT |
| Kent State | Rushing | Xavier Williams | 8 carries, 93 yards |
| Kent State | Receiving | Dante Cephas | 7 receptions, 102 yards |
| Northern Illinois | Passing | Rocky Lombardi | 7/15, 102 yards, INT |
| Northern Illinois | Rushing | Jay Ducker | 29 carries, 146 yards |
| Northern Illinois | Receiving | Trayvon Rudolph | 3 receptions, 50 yards |

=== Vs. Wyoming (Famous Idaho Potato Bowl) ===
Famous Idaho Potato Bowl

| Team | 1 | 2 | 3 | 4 | Total |
|---|---|---|---|---|---|
| Golden Flashes | 14 | 10 | 0 | 14 | 38 |
| • Cowboys | 7 | 14 | 14 | 17 | 52 |

- Date: December 21, 2021
- Location: Albertsons Stadium
  Boise, Idaho
- Game start: 3:30 p.m. EST
- Game attendance: 10,217
- Game weather: Sunny • Temperature: 39 °F (4 °C) • Wind: 2 mph (3.2 km/h) SE
- TV announcers (ESPN): Bill Roth (play-by-play), Kelly Stouffer (analyst), and Lauren Sisler (sideline)

| Statistics | KENT | WYO |
|---|---|---|
| First downs | 29 | 22 |
| Total yards | 656 | 531 |
| Rushing yards | 319 | 404 |
| Passing yards | 337 | 127 |
| Turnovers | 0 | 0 |
| Time of possession | 28:50 | 31:10 |

| Team | Category | Player | Statistics |
|---|---|---|---|
| Kent State | Passing | Dustin Crum | 17/27, 316 yards, 4 TD |
| Kent State | Rushing | Marquez Cooper | 24 carries, 125 yards |
| Kent State | Receiving | Dante Cephas | 4 receptions, 116 yards, TD |
| Wyoming | Passing | Levi Williams | 9/11, 127 yards, TD |
| Wyoming | Rushing | Levi Williams | 16 carries, 200 yards, 4 TD |
| Wyoming | Receiving | Isaiah Neyor | 5 receptions, 87 yards, TD |
