= 2021 Buffalo Bulls football team =

American college football season

2021 Buffalo Bulls football
- Conference: Mid-American Conference
- East Division
- Record: 4–8 (2–6 MAC)
- Head coach: Maurice Linguist (1st season)
- Offensive coordinator: Shane Montgomery (1st season)
- Offensive scheme: Spread
- Defensive coordinator: Joe Cauthen (1st season)
- Base defense: 4–2–5
- Captain: Game captains
- Home stadium: University at Buffalo Stadium

2021 Mid-American Conference football standings
	Conf.			Overall
Team	W		L	W		L
East Division
Kent State xy	6	–	2	7	–	7
Miami (OH)	5	–	3	7	–	6
Ohio	3	–	5	3	–	9
Bowling Green	2	–	6	4	–	8
Buffalo	2	–	6	4	–	8
Akron	1	–	7	2	–	10
West Division
Northern Illinois xy$	6	–	2	9	–	5
Central Michigan x	6	–	2	9	–	4
Toledo	5	–	3	7	–	6
Ball State	4	–	4	6	–	7
Eastern Michigan	4	–	4	7	–	6
Western Michigan	4	–	4	8	–	5
Championship: Northern Illinois 41, Kent State 23
$ – Conference champion; x – Division champion/co-champions; y – Championship game participant

The 2021 Buffalo Bulls football team represented the University at Buffalo as a member of the Mid-American Conference (MAC) during the 2021 NCAA Division I FBS football season. Led by first-year head coach Maurice Linguist, the Bulls compiled an overall record of 4–8 with a mark of 2–6 in conference play, tying for fourth place in the MAC's East Division. The team played home games at University at Buffalo Stadium in Amherst, New York.

== Schedule ==
Date	Time	Opponent	Site	TV	Result	Attendance
September 2	7:00 p.m.	Wagner*	University at Buffalo Stadium; Amherst, NY	ESPN3	W 69–7	13,063
September 11	3:30 p.m.	at Nebraska*	Memorial Stadium; Lincoln, NE	BTN	L 3–28	85,663
September 18	12:00 p.m.	No. 16 Coastal Carolina*	University at Buffalo Stadium; Amherst, NY	ESPN2	L 25–28	16,739
September 25	6:00 p.m.	at Old Dominion*	S.B. Ballard Stadium; Norfolk, VA	ESPN+	W 35–34	18,197
October 2	12:00 p.m.	Western Michigan^{†}	University at Buffalo Stadium; Amherst, NY	CBSSN	L 17–24	17,344
October 9	7:00 p.m.	at Kent State	Dix Stadium; Kent, OH	ESPNU	L 38–48	12,105
October 16	12:00 p.m.	Ohio	University at Buffalo Stadium; Amherst, NY	ESPN+	W 27–26	12,909
October 23	3:30 p.m.	at Akron	InfoCision Stadium–Summa Field; Akron, OH	ESPN+	W 45–10	8,635
October 30	12:00 p.m.	Bowling Green	University at Buffalo Stadium; Amherst, NY	CBSSN	L 44–56	13,163
November 9	7:00 p.m.	at Miami (OH)	Yager Stadium; Oxford, OH	ESPNU	L 18–45	10,069
November 17	7:00 p.m.	Northern Illinois	University at Buffalo Stadium; Amherst, NY	ESPN2	L 27–33 ^{OT}	13,097
November 23	7:00 p.m.	at Ball State	Scheumann Stadium; Muncie, IN	ESPN+	L 3–20	6,112
*Non-conference game; ^{†}Homecoming; Rankings from AP Poll released prior to the game; All times are in Eastern time

== Before the season ==
=== 2021 NFL draft ===
Defensive end Malcolm Koonce was selected in the third round of the 2021 NFL draft by the Las Vegas Raiders. Koonce was the 15th Buffalo player to be drafted in the program's history, and the first since 2017, when the Cincinnati Bengals selected Bulls tight end Mason Schreck in the seventh round, at No. 251. Koonce became the third Buffalo player drafted by the Raiders, joining Trevor Scott in 2008 and Khalil Mack in 2014.

Round	Pick	Player	Position	NFL club
3	79	Malcolm Koonce	DE	Las Vegas Raiders
