= 2021 Western Michigan Broncos football team =

American college football season

2021 Western Michigan Broncos football

Quick Lane Bowl champion

Quick Lane Bowl, W 52–24 vs. Nevada
- Conference: Mid-American Conference
- West Division
- Record: 8–5 (4–4 MAC)
- Head coach: Tim Lester (5th season)
- Co-offensive coordinators: Mike Bath (1st season); Eric Evans (1st season)
- Offensive scheme: West Coast
- Defensive coordinator: Lou Esposito (5th season)
- Base defense: 4–2–5
- Home stadium: Waldo Stadium

2021 Mid-American Conference football standings
	Conf.			Overall
Team	W		L	W		L
East Division
Kent State xy	6	–	2	7	–	7
Miami (OH)	5	–	3	7	–	6
Ohio	3	–	5	3	–	9
Bowling Green	2	–	6	4	–	8
Buffalo	2	–	6	4	–	8
Akron	1	–	7	2	–	10
West Division
Northern Illinois xy$	6	–	2	9	–	5
Central Michigan x	6	–	2	9	–	4
Toledo	5	–	3	7	–	6
Ball State	4	–	4	6	–	7
Eastern Michigan	4	–	4	7	–	6
Western Michigan	4	–	4	8	–	5
Championship: Northern Illinois 41, Kent State 23
$ – Conference champion; x – Division champion/co-champions; y – Championship game participant

The 2021 Western Michigan Broncos football team represented Western Michigan University in the 2021 NCAA Division I FBS football season. The Broncos played their home games at Waldo Stadium in Kalamazoo, Michigan, and competed in the West Division of the Mid-American Conference (MAC). The team was led by fifth-year head coach Tim Lester.

== Schedule ==
Date	Time	Opponent	Site	TV	Result	Attendance
September 4	12:00 p.m.	at Michigan*	Michigan Stadium; Ann Arbor, MI	ESPN	L 14–47	109,295
September 11	5:00 p.m.	Illinois State*	Waldo Stadium; Kalamazoo, MI	ESPN3	W 28–0	18,122
September 18	12:00 p.m.	at Pittsburgh*	Heinz Field; Pittsburgh, PA	ACCRSN	W 44–41	40,581
September 25	2:00 p.m.	San Jose State*	Waldo Stadium; Kalamazoo, MI	ESPN+	W 23–3	12,317
October 2	12:00 p.m.	at Buffalo	University at Buffalo Stadium; Amherst, NY	CBSSN	W 24–17	17,344
October 9	3:30 p.m.	Ball State	Waldo Stadium; Kalamazoo, MI	ESPNU	L 20–45	11,403
October 16	3:30 p.m.	Kent State	Waldo Stadium; Kalamazoo, MI	ESPNU	W 64–31	18,716
October 23	3:30 p.m.	at Toledo	Glass Bowl; Toledo, OH	CBSSN	L 15–34	19,906
November 3	7:00 p.m.	Central Michigan	Waldo Stadium; Kalamazoo, MI (rivalry)	ESPNU	L 30–42	13,137
November 9	7:00 p.m.	Akron	Waldo Stadium; Kalamazoo, MI	CBSSN	W 45–40	8,443
November 16	7:30 p.m.	at Eastern Michigan	Rynearson Stadium; Ypsilanti, MI (Michigan MAC Trophy)	ESPN2	L 21–22	15,272
November 23	7:00 p.m.	at Northern Illinois	Huskie Stadium; DeKalb, IL	ESPNU	W 42–21	7,156
December 27	11:00 a.m.	vs. Nevada*	Ford Field; Detroit, MI (Quick Lane Bowl)	ESPN	W 52–24	22,321
*Non-conference game; All times are in Eastern time

== Game summaries ==
=== At Michigan ===
	1	2	3	4	Total
Broncos	7	0	0	7	14
Wolverines	10	17	6	14	47

Statistics	WMU	MICH
First downs	17	22
Total yards	317	551
Rushing yards	126	335
Passing yards	191	216
Turnovers	0	0
Time of possession	31:51	28:09

Team	Category	Player	Statistics
Western Michigan	Passing	Kaleb Eleby	20/37, 191 yards, TD
Western Michigan	Rushing	Sean Tyler	10 rushes, 55 yards
Western Michigan	Receiving	Corey Crooms Jr.	4 receptions, 58 yards, TD
Michigan	Passing	Cade McNamara	9/11, 136 yards, 2 TD
Michigan	Rushing	Blake Corum	14 rushes, 111 yards, TD
Michigan	Receiving	Ronnie Bell	1 reception, 76 yards, TD

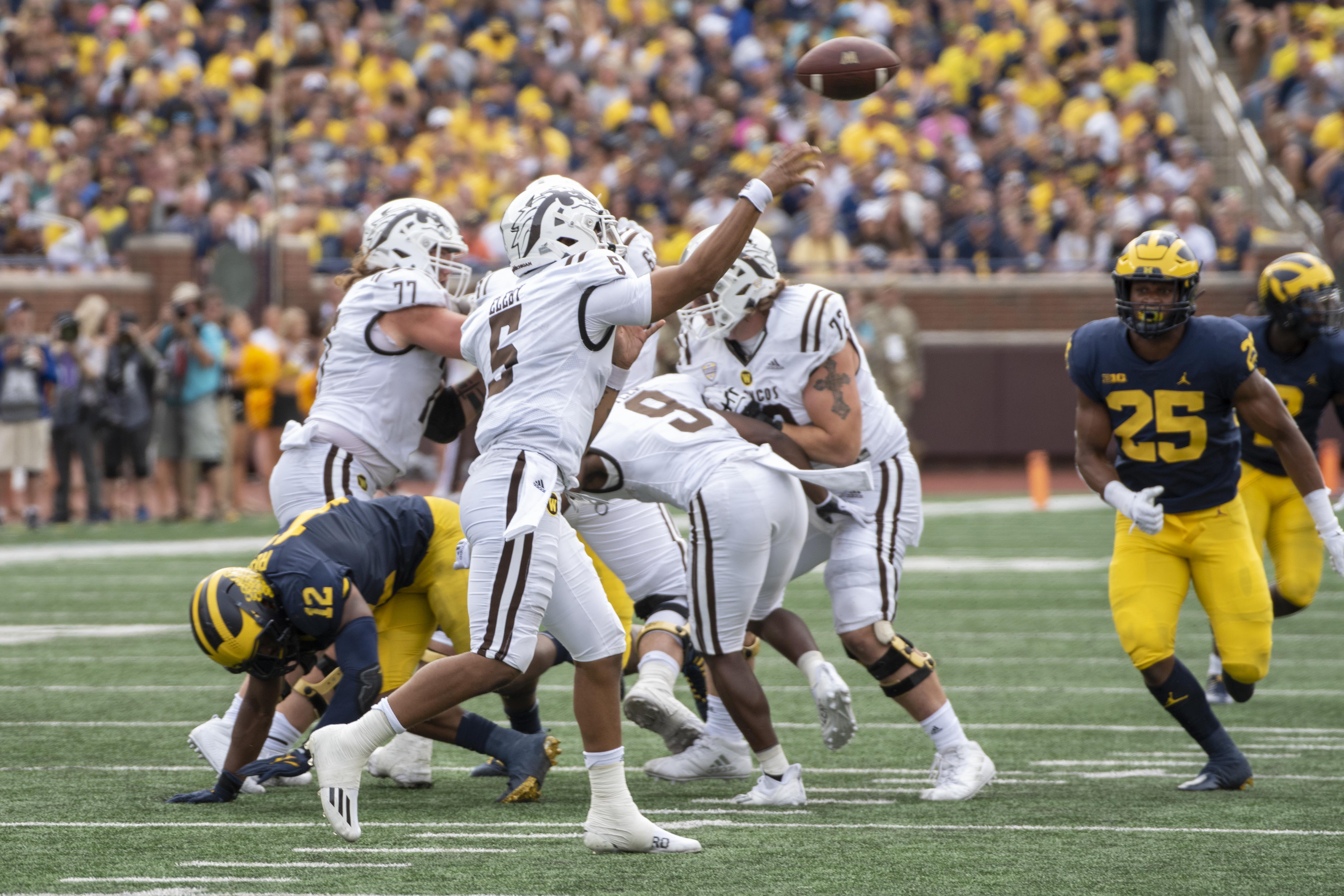
Kaleb Eleby throws a pass against the Michigan Wolverines, 2021

=== Illinois State ===
	1	2	3	4	Total
Redbirds	0	0	0	0	0
Broncos	7	7	14	0	28

Statistics	ILST	WMU
First downs	4	24
Total yards	57	407
Rushing yards	28	233
Passing yards	29	174
Turnovers	1	2
Time of possession	22:52	37:08

Team	Category	Player	Statistics
Illinois State	Passing	Bryce Jefferson	8/19, 29 yards, INT
Illinois State	Rushing	Jalen Carr	1 rush, 13 yards
Illinois State	Receiving	Mitchell Lewis	1 reception, 8 yards
Western Michigan	Passing	Kaleb Eleby	15/21, 174 yards, TD
Western Michigan	Rushing	La'Darius Jefferson	18 rushes, 106 yards, 2 TD
Western Michigan	Receiving	Jaylen Hall	6 receptions, 71 yards, TD

=== At Pittsburgh ===
	1	2	3	4	Total
Broncos	14	13	7	10	44
Panthers	7	20	7	7	41

Statistics	WMU	PITT
First downs	28	25
Total yards	517	508
Rushing yards	160	75
Passing yards	357	415
Turnovers	0	3
Time of possession	40:15	19:45

Team	Category	Player	Statistics
Western Michigan	Passing	Kaleb Eleby	23/35, 337 yards, 3 TD
Western Michigan	Rushing	Sean Tyler	14 rushes, 84 yards, TD
Western Michigan	Receiving	Corey Crooms Jr.	8 receptions, 161 yards, TD
Pittsburgh	Passing	Kenny Pickett	23/31, 382 yards, 6 TD, INT
Pittsburgh	Rushing	Kenny Pickett	10 rushes, 49 yards
Pittsburgh	Receiving	Jordan Addison	6 receptions, 124 yards, 3 TD

=== San Jose State ===
	1	2	3	4	Total
Spartans	3	0	0	0	3
Broncos	13	7	0	3	23

Statistics	SJSU	WMU
First downs	11	19
Total yards	119	347
Rushing yards	60	147
Passing yards	59	200
Turnovers	3	0
Time of possession	22:04	37:56

Team	Category	Player	Statistics
San Jose State	Passing	Nick Starkel	6/14, 55 yards, INT
San Jose State	Rushing	Tyler Nevens	15 rushes, 94 yards
San Jose State	Receiving	Isaiah Hamilton	3 receptions, 27 yards
Western Michigan	Passing	Kaleb Eleby	17/28, 200 yards, 2 TD
Western Michigan	Rushing	Sean Tyler	12 rushes, 65 yards
Western Michigan	Receiving	Skyy Moore	10 receptions, 104 yards

=== At Buffalo ===
	1	2	3	4	Total
Broncos					0
Bulls					0

Statistics	WMU	BUFF
First downs		
Total yards		
Rushing yards		
Passing yards		
Turnovers		
Time of possession		

Team	Category	Player	Statistics
Western Michigan	Passing		
Western Michigan	Rushing		
Western Michigan	Receiving		
Buffalo	Passing		
Buffalo	Rushing		
Buffalo	Receiving		

=== Ball State ===
	1	2	3	4	Total
Cardinals					0
Broncos					0

Statistics	BALL	WMU
First downs		
Total yards		
Rushing yards		
Passing yards		
Turnovers		
Time of possession		

Team	Category	Player	Statistics
Ball State	Passing		
Ball State	Rushing		
Ball State	Receiving		
Western Michigan	Passing		
Western Michigan	Rushing		
Western Michigan	Receiving		

=== Kent State ===
	1	2	3	4	Total
Golden Flashes					0
Broncos					0

Statistics	KENT	WMU
First downs		
Total yards		
Rushing yards		
Passing yards		
Turnovers		
Time of possession		

Team	Category	Player	Statistics
Kent State	Passing		
Kent State	Rushing		
Kent State	Receiving		
Western Michigan	Passing		
Western Michigan	Rushing		
Western Michigan	Receiving		

=== At Toledo ===
	1	2	3	4	Total
Broncos					0
Rockets					0

Statistics	WMU	TOL
First downs		
Total yards		
Rushing yards		
Passing yards		
Turnovers		
Time of possession		

Team	Category	Player	Statistics
Western Michigan	Passing		
Western Michigan	Rushing		
Western Michigan	Receiving		
Toledo	Passing		
Toledo	Rushing		
Toledo	Receiving		

=== Central Michigan ===
	1	2	3	4	Total
Chippewas					0
Broncos					0

Statistics	CMU	WMU
First downs		
Total yards		
Rushing yards		
Passing yards		
Turnovers		
Time of possession		

Team	Category	Player	Statistics
Central Michigan	Passing		
Central Michigan	Rushing		
Central Michigan	Receiving		
Western Michigan	Passing		
Western Michigan	Rushing		
Western Michigan	Receiving		

=== Akron ===
	1	2	3	4	Total
Zips					0
Broncos					0

Statistics	AKR	WMU
First downs		
Total yards		
Rushing yards		
Passing yards		
Turnovers		
Time of possession		

Team	Category	Player	Statistics
Akron	Passing		
Akron	Rushing		
Akron	Receiving		
Western Michigan	Passing		
Western Michigan	Rushing		
Western Michigan	Receiving		

=== At Eastern Michigan ===
	1	2	3	4	Total
Broncos					0
Eagles					0

Statistics	WMU	EMU
First downs		
Total yards		
Rushing yards		
Passing yards		
Turnovers		
Time of possession		

Team	Category	Player	Statistics
Western Michigan	Passing		
Western Michigan	Rushing		
Western Michigan	Receiving		
Eastern Michigan	Passing		
Eastern Michigan	Rushing		
Eastern Michigan	Receiving		

=== At Northern Illinois ===
	1	2	3	4	Total
Broncos					0
Huskies					0

Statistics	WMU	NIU
First downs		
Total yards		
Rushing yards		
Passing yards		
Turnovers		
Time of possession		

Team	Category	Player	Statistics
Western Michigan	Passing		
Western Michigan	Rushing		
Western Michigan	Receiving		
Northern Illinois	Passing		
Northern Illinois	Rushing		
Northern Illinois	Receiving		

=== Vs. Nevada (Quick Lane Bowl) ===
	1	2	3	4	Total
Broncos					0
Wolf Pack					0

Statistics	WMU	NEV
First downs		
Total yards		
Rushing yards		
Passing yards		
Turnovers		
Time of possession		

Team	Category	Player	Statistics
Western Michigan	Passing		
Western Michigan	Rushing		
Western Michigan	Receiving		
Nevada	Passing		
Nevada	Rushing		
Nevada	Receiving		

== Players drafted into the NFL ==
Round	Pick	Player	Position	NFL Club
2	54	Skyy Moore	WR	Kansas City Chiefs
