= 2021 Akron Zips football team =

American college football season

2021 Akron Zips football
- Conference: Mid-American Conference
- East Division
- Record: 2–10 (1–7 MAC)
- Head coach: Tom Arth (3rd season; first nine games); Oscar Rodriguez (interim)
- Offensive coordinator: Tommy Zagorski (3rd season)
- Offensive scheme: Pro-style
- Defensive coordinator: Matt Feeney (3rd season)
- Base defense: 3–4
- Home stadium: InfoCision Stadium–Summa Field

2021 Mid-American Conference football standings
	Conf.			Overall
Team	W		L	W		L
East Division
Kent State xy	6	–	2	7	–	7
Miami (OH)	5	–	3	7	–	6
Ohio	3	–	5	3	–	9
Bowling Green	2	–	6	4	–	8
Buffalo	2	–	6	4	–	8
Akron	1	–	7	2	–	10
West Division
Northern Illinois xy$	6	–	2	9	–	5
Central Michigan x	6	–	2	9	–	4
Toledo	5	–	3	7	–	6
Ball State	4	–	4	6	–	7
Eastern Michigan	4	–	4	7	–	6
Western Michigan	4	–	4	8	–	5
Championship: Northern Illinois 41, Kent State 23
$ – Conference champion; x – Division champion/co-champions; y – Championship game participant

The 2021 Akron Zips football team represented the University of Akron during the 2021 NCAA Division I FBS football season. The Zips were led by third-year head coach Tom Arth and played their home games at InfoCision Stadium in Akron, Ohio. They competed as members of the East Division of the Mid-American Conference (MAC).

Arth was fired on November 4, 2021. His overall record at Akron was 3–24.

== Schedule ==
Date	Time	Opponent	Site	TV	Result	Attendance
September 4	7:00 p.m.	at Auburn*	Jordan Hare Stadium; Auburn, AL	ESPN+/SECN+	L 10–60	83,821
September 11	3:30 p.m.	Temple*	InfoCision Stadium; Akron, OH	ESPN+	L 24–45	14,474
September 18	3:30 p.m.	Bryant*	InfoCision Stadium; Akron, OH	ESPN3	W 35–14	8,779
September 25	7:30 p.m.	at No. 10 Ohio State*	Ohio Stadium; Columbus, OH	BTN	L 7–59	95,178
October 2	3:30 p.m.	Ohio	InfoCision Stadium; Akron, OH	ESPN3	L 17–34	12,616
October 9	12:00 p.m.	at Bowling Green	Doyt Perry Stadium; Bowling Green, OH	ESPN+	W 35–20	17,797
October 16	2:30 p.m.	at Miami (OH)	Yager Stadium; Oxford, OH	ESPN+	L 21–34	11,042
October 23	3:30 p.m.	Buffalo	InfoCision Stadium; Akron, OH	ESPN+	L 10–45	8,635
November 2	7:00 p.m.	Ball State	InfoCision Stadium; Akron, OH	CBSSN	L 25–31	7,683
November 9	7:00 p.m.	at Western Michigan	Waldo Stadium; Kalamazoo, MI	CBSSN	L 40–45	8,443
November 20	12:00 p.m.	Kent State	InfoCision Stadium; Akron, OH (Wagon Wheel)	ESPN+	L 0–38	8,879
November 27	12:00 p.m.	at Toledo	Glass Bowl; Toledo, OH	ESPN+	L 14–49	11,282
*Non-conference game; Rankings from AP Poll released prior to the game; All times are in Eastern time
