= Sean Lewis (American football) =

American football player and coach (born 1986)

Current position
- Title: Head coach
- Team: San Diego State
- Conference: Pac-12
- Record: 18–18

Biographical details
- Born: April 11, 1986 (age 40); Oak Lawn, Illinois, U.S.

Playing career
- 2004–2007: Wisconsin
- Position: Tight end

Coaching career (HC unless noted)
- 2008–2009: Harold L. Richards HS (IL) (OC)
- 2010: Nebraska–Omaha (TE)
- 2011: Akron (GA)
- 2012–2013: Eastern Illinois (IWR/TE)
- 2014: Bowling Green (WR)
- 2015: Bowling Green (co-OC/QB)
- 2016–2017: Syracuse (co-OC/QB)
- 2018–2022: Kent State
- 2023: Colorado (OC/QB)
- 2024–present: San Diego State

Head coaching record
- Overall: 42–49
- Bowls: 1–2

Accomplishments and honors

Championships
- 1 MAC East Division (2021)

Sean Lewis (born April 11, 1986) is an American college football coach and former player who is the head football coach at San Diego State University (SDSU). He was the offensive coordinator at the University of Colorado Boulder in 2023 and the head coach at Kent State University from 2018 to 2022. Lewis played college football at the University of Wisconsin–Madison.

== Playing career ==
Lewis attended Harold L. Richards High School in Oak Lawn, Illinois, southwest of Chicago, where he played quarterback. Lewis became the school's career passing leader with 3,131 yards and 39 touchdown passes in three seasons. He added 915 yards on the ground on 192 carries and 15 touchdowns. He then attended the University of Wisconsin in Madison, Wisconsin, on an athletic scholarship. He was recruited as a quarterback but converted to tight end. A career backup, Lewis' first reception came in a 2007 game against Minnesota. He graduated from Wisconsin in December 2007 with one year of eligibility remaining.

== Coaching career ==
Following graduation, Lewis worked various jobs, including as a personal trainer and a "dull office supply sales job," before turning to coaching as a career. From 2008–2009 he was offensive coordinator at his former high school in Oak Lawn. His first collegiate coaching job was in 2010 at Nebraska–Omaha and he was a graduate assistant at Akron for the 2011 season. At Eastern Illinois, the Panthers made the FCS Playoffs both seasons he was there and reached the quarterfinals in 2013 with a 12-2 record with an offense led by Jimmy Garoppolo. At Bowling Green, his 2015 offense ranked fourth in the nation at 546.8 yards per game and sixth in scoring at 42.2 points per game. He was the co-offensive coordinator and quarterbacks coach for Matt Johnson, who was the MAC Offensive Player of the Year and finished second nationally with 4,946 yards and 46 touchdowns. In 2017, Syracuse averaged 456.3 yards and 24.4 first downs per game and defeated defending national champion Clemson 27-24 on Oct. 13. His Orange offense led the nation in snaps per game (87.8) and in 2016, his offense set or tied 40 school records including most passing yards (3,855) while the 5,290 yards of total offense was second most in program history.

=== Kent State ===
Lewis became Kent State's 22nd head football coach on December 21, 2017. Lewis was 31 when he was hired at Kent State in 2017, becoming the youngest head coach in FBS by three years, where he compiled a 24-31 overall record and 19-17 record in Mid-American Conference play. He led the Golden Flashes to their first-ever bowl victory in 2019.

=== Colorado ===
On December 6, 2022, he was hired at Colorado under new head coach Deion Sanders as the team's offensive coordinator.

=== San Diego State ===
On November 29, 2023, San Diego State University hired Lewis as its new head coach, replacing a retiring Brady Hoke following the 2023 season.

== Head coaching record ==
Year	Team	Overall	Conference	Standing	Bowl/playoffs
Kent State Golden Flashes (Mid-American Conference) (2018–2022)
2018	Kent State	2–10	1–7	6th (East)	
2019	Kent State	7–6	5–3	T–2nd (East)	W Frisco
2020	Kent State	3–1	3–1	2nd (East)	
2021	Kent State	7–7	6–2	1st (East)	L Famous Idaho Potato
2022	Kent State	5–7	4–4	T–4th (East)	
Kent State:		24–31	19–17		
San Diego State Aztecs (Mountain West Conference) (2024–2025)
2024	San Diego State	3–9	2–5	T–10th	
2025	San Diego State	9–4	6–2	T–1st	L North Texas
San Diego State Aztecs (Pac-12 Conference) (2026–present)
2026	San Diego State	6–5	5–2		
San Diego State:		18–18	13–9		
Total:		42–49			
National championship Conference title Conference division title or championship game berth
