= 2021 Ohio Bobcats football team =

American college football season

2021 Ohio Bobcats football
- Conference: Mid-American Conference
- East Division
- Record: 3–9 (3–5 MAC)
- Head coach: Tim Albin (1st season)
- Co-offensive coordinators: Scott Isphording (1st season); Allen Rudolph (1st season)
- Offensive scheme: Spread option
- Co-defensive coordinators: Ron Collins (5th season); Pete Germano (3rd season)
- Base defense: 4–3
- Captains: Kai Caesar; Alvin Floyd; Bryce Houston; Cameron Odem; Nick Sink; Julian Ross; Kurtis Rourke
- Home stadium: Peden Stadium

2021 Mid-American Conference football standings
	Conf.			Overall
Team	W		L	W		L
East Division
Kent State xy	6	–	2	7	–	7
Miami (OH)	5	–	3	7	–	6
Ohio	3	–	5	3	–	9
Bowling Green	2	–	6	4	–	8
Buffalo	2	–	6	4	–	8
Akron	1	–	7	2	–	10
West Division
Northern Illinois xy$	6	–	2	9	–	5
Central Michigan x	6	–	2	9	–	4
Toledo	5	–	3	7	–	6
Ball State	4	–	4	6	–	7
Eastern Michigan	4	–	4	7	–	6
Western Michigan	4	–	4	8	–	5
Championship: Northern Illinois 41, Kent State 23
$ – Conference champion; x – Division champion/co-champions; y – Championship game participant

The 2021 Ohio Bobcats football team represented Ohio University in the 2021 NCAA Division I FBS football season. They were led by 1st-year head coach Tim Albin, who was promoted to head coach when long time head coach Frank Solich abruptly retired shortly before the season, and played their home games at Peden Stadium in Athens, Ohio, as members of the East Division of the Mid-American Conference. The Bobcats finished the season 3–9 and 3–5 in the MAC to finish in third place in the East Division. This was Ohio's first losing season since 2008.

== Preseason ==
=== Preseason media poll ===
The MAC preseason media poll was announced on July 20. Ohio was picked to finish second in the East Division.

== Schedule ==
Date	Time	Opponent	Site	TV	Result	Attendance
September 4	7:00 p.m.	Syracuse*	Peden Stadium; Athens, OH	CBSSN	L 9–29	23,904
September 11	2:00 p.m.	Duquesne*	Peden Stadium; Athens, OH	ESPN3	L 26–28	19,411
September 16	8:00 p.m.	at Louisiana*	Cajun Field; Lafayette, LA	ESPN	L 14–49	17,709
September 25	12:00 p.m.	at Northwestern*	Ryan Field; Evanston, IL	BTN	L 6–35	27,129
October 2	3:30 p.m.	at Akron	InfoCision Stadium; Akron, OH	ESPN3	W 34–17	12,616
October 9	3:30 p.m.	Central Michigan^{†}	Peden Stadium; Athens, OH	ESPN+	L 27–30	20,928
October 16	12:00 p.m.	at Buffalo	University at Buffalo Stadium; Amherst, NY	ESPN+	L 26–27	12,909
October 23	1:00 p.m.	Kent State	Peden Stadium; Athens, OH	ESPN+	L 27–34	15,854
November 2	7:30 p.m.	Miami (OH)	Peden Stadium; Athens, OH (Battle of the Bricks)	ESPNU	W 35–33	15,940
November 9	8:00 p.m.	at Eastern Michigan	Rynearson Stadium; Ypsilanti, MI	ESPN2	W 34–26	13,636
November 16	7:00 p.m.	Toledo	Peden Stadium; Athens, OH	ESPN+	L 23–35	9,716
November 26	12:00 p.m.	at Bowling Green	Doyt Perry Stadium; Bowling Green, OH	CBSSN	L 10–21	9,339
*Non-conference game; ^{†}Homecoming; Rankings from AP Poll released prior to the game; All times are in Eastern time

== Personnel ==
=== Roster ===
2021 Ohio Bobcats football roster

Quarterback

- 5 Kadin Beler – R-Fr. (6'1") Phoenix, Ariz. / Arcadia
- 7 Kurtis Rourke – R-So. (6'3") Oakville, Ontario, Canada / Holy Trinity
- 10 CJ Harris – R-Fr. (6'3") West Bloomfield, Mich. / West Bloomfield
- 18 Armani Rogers – Red 5th (6'5") Los Angeles, Calif. / Hamilton

Running back

- 0 O'Shaan Allison – R-Jr. (5'10") Malvern, Pa. / Malvern Prep
- 21 Nolan McCormick – Fr. (5'10") /
- 22 Sieh Bangura – Fr. (60'") Bowie, Md. / Dematha Catholic High School
- 23 Julian Ross – Red 5th (5'11") Kansas City, Mo. / Staley
- 24 De'Montre Tuggle – Red 5th (5'10") Channelview, Texas / Channelview
- 27 Jake Neatherton – R-Sr. (5'10") Miamisburg, Oh. / Miamisburg
- 37 Tyler Toledo – R-Fr. (5'9") /

Wide receiver

- 2 Keegan Wilburn – R-So. (5'9") Nelsonville, Ohio / Nelsonville-York
- 3 Cameron Odom – Red 5th (6'1") Bedford, Ohio / Bedford
- 4 Tyler Walton – R-Jr. (5'9") St. Louis, Mo. / Christian Brothers
- 6 Isiah Cox – R-Sr. (5'11") Jasper, Ala. / Walker
- 12 JJ Conner – R-Sr. (5'10") New Orleans, La. / Landry-Walker HS
- 13 Anthony Whitney – R-Jr. (5'11") Columbus, Ohio / Bishop Hartley
- 15 Philip Cole – R-Jr. (5'8") Columbus, Ohio / Bishop Hartley
- 16 Isaiah Davis – Fr. (6'3") Apopka, Fla. / Wekiva High School
- 17 Nigel Drummond II – R-So. (5'10") Cleveland, Ohio / Saint Ignatius
- 28 Shane Bonner – R-Jr. (5'11") New Concord, Ohio / John Glenn
- 31 Major Brown – R-Sr. (") /
- 80 Chase Cokley – Red 5th (6'1") Austin, Texas / Westlake
- 81 Aramoni Rhone – Fr. (6'5") Orlando, Fla. / Plant City High School
- 84 Wade Sheets – R-Fr. (6'3") Convoy, Ohio / Crestview
- 85 James Bostic – R-Sr. (6'3") Fort Lauderdale, Fla. / Cardinal Gibbons
- 89 Miles Cross – Fr. (6'1") Bowie, Md. / Rock Hill High School (S.C.)

Tight end

- 14 Bryce Butler – Fr. (6'3") Bowie, Md. / St. John’s College High School
- 44 Adam Luehrman – Red 5th (6'4") Athens, Ohio / Athens
- 82 Alec Burton – R-Jr. (6'4") Danville, Ind. / Danville
- 83 Casey Clanton – R-So. (6'3") Phoenix, Ariz. / Central
- 86 Tyler Foster – R-So. (6'5") Pickerington, Ohio / Pickerington
- 87 Will Kacmarek – Fr. (6'6") St. Louis, Mo. / Mary Institute and Saint Louis Country Day School
- 88 Ryan Luehrman – Red 5th (6'4") Athens, Ohio / Athens

Offensive Lineman

- 51 Davion Weatherspoon – Fr. (6'1") Harper Woods, Mich. / Harper Woods High School
- 53 Jay Amburgey – R-So. (6'4") Reynoldsburg, Ohio / Reynoldsburg
- 54 Joe Oakes – R-So. (6'2") Cincinnati, Ohio / Indian Hill
- 58 Bryce Ramer – R-Jr. (6'4") Beaver, Pa. / Beaver Area
- 59 Gary Hoover – R-Sr. (6'3") Neptune, N.J. / Neptune
- 60 Demond Arter – R-Fr. (6'4") Elkridge, Md. / St. John's (Washington DC)
- 61 Kaden Rogers – Fr. (6'3") Hamilton, Ohio / Ross High School
- 64 Shedrick Rhodes Jr. – R-Fr. (6'4") McDonough, Ga. / Eagle's Landing Christian Academy
- 65 Jake Skelly – Fr. (6'4") Columbus, Ohio / Bishop Harley High School
- 66 Christophe Atkinson – R-So. (6'3") Leesburg, Va. / Tuscarora
- 69 Parker Titsworth – R-So. (6'1") Wexford, Pa. / North Allegheny
- 70 Nick Sink – Red 5th (6'2") Fishers, Ind. / Hamilton Southeastern
- 71 Aidan MacDonald – R-So. (6'3") Chardon, Ohio / Notre Dame-Cathedral Latin
- 72 Kurt Danneker – R-Jr. (6'3") Linden, Pa. / Williamsport Area
- 73 Joseph Habinowski – R-Fr. (6'5") Pembroke Pines, Fla. / Chaminade-Madonna College Preparatory
- 74 Luke Vannest – R-So. (6'4") North Canton, Ohio / Hoover
- 75 TJ Jackson – Red 5th (6'7") Cumberland, Va. / Cumberland County
- 76 Hagen Meservy – Red 5th (6'3") Tulsa, Okla. / Jenks
- 78 Samson Jackson – R-Sr. (6'4") Tarpon Springs, Fla. / Palm Harbor
- 79 Brody Rodgers – R-Sr. (6'4") Athens, Ohio / Athens

Placekicker

- 25 Tristian Vandenberg – R-So. (6'4") Buffalo, N.Y. / Canisius
- 47 Stephen Johnson – R-Sr. (6'1") Arlington, Texas /
- 97 Jonah Fortkamp – R-Fr. (5'11") Columbus, Ohio / Bishop Watterson

Defensive Lineman

- 0 Denzel Daxon – R-Jr. (6'2") Nassau, Bahamas / Carol City (Fla.)
- 9 Will Evans – Red 5th (6'2") Augusta, Ga. / Aquinas
- 16 Chris Mayfield – R-Fr. (6'2") Hilliard, Ohio / Hilliard Bradley
- 17 Vonnie Watkins – R-Jr. (6'3") Lusby, Md. / Patuxent
- 41 David Patterson – Fr. (6'3") Lilburn, Ga. / Parkview High School
- 42 Michael Taylor – R-Jr. (6'2") Rockville Centre, N.Y. / Holy Cross
- 44 Jeremiah Burton – R-So. (6'1") Reynoldsburg, Ohio / Reynoldsburg
- 50 Kai Caesar – R-Sr. (6'1") Cache, Okla. / Cache
- 51 Griffin Davies – R-So. (6'2") Elyria, Ohio / Elyria Catholic
- 52 Bryce Dugan – R-Jr. (6'1") Milford, Ohio / Milford
- 54 Kylen McCracken – R-Jr. (6'3") Cleveland Heights, Ohio / Cleveland Heights
- 55 Rodney Mathews – R-Jr. (6'2") Memphis, Tenn. / Craigmont
- 90 Bralen Henderson – Fr. (6'3") Pittsburgh, Pa. / Central Catholic High School
- 91 Aiden Malenchek – R-So. (6'5") Twinsburg, Ohio / Twinsburg
- 92 Zach Burks – Red 5th (6'1") Olathe, Kansas / Olathe North
- 94 Bradley Weaver – Fr. (6'4") Hilliard, Ohio / Hilliard Darby High School
- 95 Dane Middlebrook – R-Fr. (6'0") Indianapolis, Ind. / Brownsburg
- 96 Bryce Stai – R-Jr. (6'2") Lincoln, Neb. / Norris
- 99 Joey Woolard – R-Fr. (6'1") Grove City, Ohio / Grove City

Linebacker

- 3 Jeremiah Wood – R-Jr. (6'0") Pickerington, Ohio / Pickerington Central
- 18 Caden Campolieti – R-So. (6'1") Cleveland, Ohio / Saint Ignatius
- 23 Quintell Quinn – Fr. (6'1") Columbus, Ohio / St. Francis DeSales High School
- 26 Bryce Kitrell – R-Fr. (5'10") Ashland, Neb. / Ashland-Greenwood
- 30 Ben Johnson – R-So. (6'1") Pickerington, Ohio / Pickerington North
- 32 Bryce Houston – R-Jr. (5'11") Lewis Center, Ohio / Olentangy Orange
- 33 Cannon Blauser – R-So. (6'1") Hilliard, Ohio / Hilliard Bradley
- 34 Dylan Stevens – R-Fr. (5'10") Powell, Ohio / Olentangy Liberty
- 35 Shay Taylor – Fr. (6'3") Mount Perry, Ohio / Sheridan High School
- 36 Cam Dorsey – R-Fr. (6'0") Alpharetta, Ga. / Alpharetta
- 38 Keye Thompson – R-Jr. (6'0") Barberton, Ohio / Barberton
- 40 Jack McCrory – R-Jr. (6'1") Springfield, Ohio / Springfield Shawnee
- 46 Jayden Spires – R-Fr. (6'1") Jackson, Ohio / Jackson
- 48 Kyle Kelly – R-So. (6'1") Newport, Ky. / Newport Central Catholic

Defensive back

- 4 Jamal Hudson – R-Sr. (5'11") Miami, Fla. / Miami Central
- 5 Jamison Collier – R-Jr. (6'1") Snellville, Ga. / Brookwood
- 8 Justin Birchette – R-Jr. (5'10") Palm Beach Gardens, Fla. / Dwyer
- 10 Alex Wolff – Red 5th (5'10") Chillicothe, Ohio / Zane Trace
- 11 Tariq Drake – R-Sr. (6'0") Leavittsburg, Ohio / LaBrae
- 12 Jarren Hampton – Red 5th (5'10") Fostoria, Ohio / Fremont Ross
- 13 John Gregory – R-Jr. (6'1") Indian Land, S.C. / Indian Land
- 14 Roman Parodie – R-Fr. (6'1") Fort Lauderdale, Fla. / Cardinal Gibbons
- 15 Nife Oseni – R-Fr. (") Rolling Meadows, Ill. / Rolling Meadows
- 19 Jake Novello – R-So. (6'0") /
- 20 Alvin Floyd – R-Sr. (5'10") North Miami Beach, Fla. / North Miami Beach
- 21 Giovonni Scales – Fr. (6'1") Columbus, Ohio / Marion-Franklin High School
- 24 Torrie Cox, Jr. – Fr. (5'9") Miami Gardens, Fla. / | Chaminade-Madonna Preparatory School
- 29 John Motton – Fr. (5'11") Groveport, Ohio / Groveport-Madison High School
- 39 Michael Ballentine – Sr. (6'0") Mentor, Ohio / Mentor
- 45 Hayden Austin – Fr. (") /

Punter

- 43 Jack Wilson – R-Fr. (5'10") Lancefield, Victoria, Australia / Gisborne Secondary College (ProKick Australia)
- 49 Jonah Wieland – Red 5th (6'1") /

Long snapper

- 31 Justin Holloway – R-Jr. (6'3") Venice, Fla. / Venice
