= 2021 Bowling Green Falcons football team =

American college football season

2021 Bowling Green Falcons football
- Conference: Mid-American Conference
- East Division
- Record: 4–8 (2–6 MAC)
- Head coach: Scot Loeffler (3rd season)
- Offensive coordinator: Terry Malone (3rd season)
- Offensive scheme: Multiple
- Defensive coordinator: Eric Lewis (1st season)
- Base defense: 4–3 or 4–2–5
- Home stadium: Doyt Perry Stadium

2021 Mid-American Conference football standings
	Conf.			Overall
Team	W		L	W		L
East Division
Kent State xy	6	–	2	7	–	7
Miami (OH)	5	–	3	7	–	6
Ohio	3	–	5	3	–	9
Bowling Green	2	–	6	4	–	8
Buffalo	2	–	6	4	–	8
Akron	1	–	7	2	–	10
West Division
Northern Illinois xy$	6	–	2	9	–	5
Central Michigan x	6	–	2	9	–	4
Toledo	5	–	3	7	–	6
Ball State	4	–	4	6	–	7
Eastern Michigan	4	–	4	7	–	6
Western Michigan	4	–	4	8	–	5
Championship: Northern Illinois 41, Kent State 23
$ – Conference champion; x – Division champion/co-champions; y – Championship game participant

The 2021 Bowling Green Falcons football team represented Bowling Green State University during the 2021 NCAA Division I FBS football season. The Falcons were led by third-year head coach Scot Loeffler and played their home games at Doyt Perry Stadium in Bowling Green, Ohio. They competed as members of the East Division of the Mid-American Conference (MAC).

== Schedule ==
Date	Time	Opponent	Site	TV	Result	Attendance
September 2	8:00 p.m.	at Tennessee*	Neyland Stadium; Knoxville, TN	SECN	L 6–38	84,314
September 11	4:00 p.m.	South Alabama*	Doyt Perry Stadium; Bowling Green, OH	ESPN+	L 19–22	15,105
September 18	5:00 p.m.	Murray State*	Doyt Perry Stadium; Bowling Green, OH	ESPN3	W 27–10	20,097
September 25	12:00 p.m.	at Minnesota*	Huntington Bank Stadium; Minneapolis, MN	ESPNU	W 14–10	46,236
October 2	3:30 p.m.	at Kent State	Dix Stadium; Kent, OH (Anniversary Award)	ESPN+	L 20–27	20,537
October 9	12:00 p.m.	Akron	Doyt Perry Stadium; Bowling Green, OH	ESPN+	L 20–35	17,797
October 16	3:30 p.m.	at Northern Illinois	Huskie Stadium; DeKalb, IL	ESPN+	L 26–34	7,854
October 23	12:00 p.m.	Eastern Michigan	Doyt Perry Stadium; Bowling Green, OH	ESPN+	L 24–55	10,875
October 30	12:00 p.m.	at Buffalo	University at Buffalo Stadium; Amherst, NY	CBSSN	W 56–44	13,163
November 10	7:00 p.m.	Toledo	Doyt Perry Stadium; Bowling Green, OH (rivalry)	CBSSN	L 17–49	18,349
November 16	8:00 p.m.	at Miami (OH)	Yager Stadium; Oxford, OH	ESPNU	L 7–34	10,269
November 26	12:00 p.m.	Ohio	Doyt Perry Stadium; Bowling Green, OH	CBSSN	W 21–10	9,339
*Non-conference game; Rankings from AP Poll released prior to the game; All times are in Eastern time
