= 2021 Eastern Michigan Eagles football team =

American college football season

2021 Eastern Michigan Eagles football

LendingTree Bowl, L 20–56 vs. Liberty
- Conference: Mid-American Conference
- West Division
- Record: 7–6 (4–4 MAC)
- Head coach: Chris Creighton (8th season)
- Offensive scheme: Multiple
- Defensive coordinator: Neal Neathery (6th season)
- Base defense: 4–2–5
- Home stadium: Rynearson Stadium

2021 Mid-American Conference football standings
	Conf.			Overall
Team	W		L	W		L
East Division
Kent State xy	6	–	2	7	–	7
Miami (OH)	5	–	3	7	–	6
Ohio	3	–	5	3	–	9
Bowling Green	2	–	6	4	–	8
Buffalo	2	–	6	4	–	8
Akron	1	–	7	2	–	10
West Division
Northern Illinois xy$	6	–	2	9	–	5
Central Michigan x	6	–	2	9	–	4
Toledo	5	–	3	7	–	6
Ball State	4	–	4	6	–	7
Eastern Michigan	4	–	4	7	–	6
Western Michigan	4	–	4	8	–	5
Championship: Northern Illinois 41, Kent State 23
$ – Conference champion; x – Division champion/co-champions; y – Championship game participant

The 2021 Eastern Michigan Eagles football team represented Eastern Michigan University during the 2021 NCAA Division I FBS football season. The Eagles were led by eighth-year head coach Chris Creighton and played their home games at Rynearson Stadium in Ypsilanti, Michigan. They competed as members of the West Division of the Mid-American Conference (MAC). For the third time in the past six seasons (2016, 2018), the Eagles clinched a winning record, becoming the sixth Eagle team to reach seven wins.

== Schedule ==
Date	Time	Opponent	Site	TV	Result	Attendance
September 3	7:00 p.m.	Saint Francis (PA)*	Rynearson Stadium; Ypsilanti, MI	ESPN3	W 35–15	16,461
September 11	7:00 p.m.	at No. 18 Wisconsin*	Camp Randall Stadium; Madison, WI	FS1	L 7–34	70,967
September 18	3:30 p.m.	at UMass*	Warren McGuirk Alumni Stadium; Hadley, MA	NESN+	W 42–28	7,012
September 25	2:00 p.m.	Texas State*	Rynearson Stadium; Ypsilanti, MI	ESPN+	W 59–21	14,253
October 2	2:00 p.m.	at Northern Illinois	Huskie Stadium; DeKalb, IL	ESPN+	L 20–27	10,034
October 9	3:30 p.m.	Miami (OH)	Rynearson Stadium; Ypsilanti, MI	ESPN+	W 13–12	15,664
October 16	2:00 p.m.	Ball State	Rynearson Stadium; Ypsilanti, MI	ESPN+	L 31–38	15,258
October 23	12:00 p.m.	at Bowling Green	Doyt Perry Stadium; Bowling Green, OH	ESPN+	W 55–24	10,875
November 2	7:30 p.m.	at Toledo	Glass Bowl; Toledo, OH	ESPN2	W 52–49	14,997
November 9	8:00 p.m.	Ohio	Rynearson Stadium; Ypsilanti, MI	ESPN2	L 26–34	13,636
November 16	7:30 p.m.	Western Michigan	Rynearson Stadium; Ypsilanti, MI (Michigan MAC Trophy)	ESPN2	W 22–21	15,272
November 26	12:00 p.m.	at Central Michigan	Kelly/Shorts Stadium; Mount Pleasant, MI (rivalry, Michigan MAC Trophy)	ESPNU	L 10–31	7,708
December 18	5:45 p.m.	vs. Liberty*	Hancock Whitney Stadium; Mobile, AL (LendingTree Bowl)	ESPN	L 20–56	15,186
*Non-conference game; Rankings from AP Poll released prior to the game; All times are in Eastern time

== Game summaries ==
=== at No. 18 (FBS) Wisconsin ===
Eastern Michigan vs. Wisconsin – Game summary

Quarter	1	2	3	4	Total
Eagles	0	0	0	7	7
No. 18 Badgers	7	17	3	7	34

at Camp Randall Stadium, Madison, Wisconsin

- Date: September 11, 2021
- Game time: 7:00 p.m. EST
- Game weather: 82 °F (28 °C); Sunny; Wind at SW3 MPH
- Game attendance: 70,967
- Referee: Reggie Smith
- TV announcers (FS1): Dan Hellie (play-by-play) and Robert Smith (analyst)

Game information

First quarter

- WISC – Chez Mellusi 6-yard TD run, Collin Larsh kick, 4:39 (Wisconsin, 7–0)

Second quarter

- WISC – Collin Larsh 33-yard field goal, 13:39 (Wisconsin, 10–0)
- WISC – Jalen Berger 6-yard TD run, Collin Larsh kick, 7:02 (Wisconsin, 17–0)
- WISC – Isaac Guerendo 82-yard TD run, Collin Larsh kick, 4:40 (Wisconsin, 24–0)

Third quarter

- WISC – Larsh, 39-yard field goal, 8:02 (Wisconsin, 27–0)

Fourth quarter

- EMU – Chase Wolf pass intercepted for a TD, Chad Ryland kick, 9:38 (Wisconsin, 27–7)
- WISC – Braelon Allen 1-yard TD run, Collin Larsh kick, 4:16 (Wisconsin, 34–7)

Top passers

- EMU – Preston Hutchinson – 6/13, 53 yards, INT
- WISC – Graham Mertz – 14/17, 141 yards

Top rushers

- EMU – Preston Hutchinson – 3 rushes, 12 yards
- WISC – Chez Mellusi – 20 rushes, 144 yards, TD

Top receivers

- EMU – Zach Westmoreland – 2 receptions, 35 yards
- WISC – Kendric Pryor – 4 receptions, 54 yards

Top defenders

- EMU – Scott Woo – 3 tackles, 2 TFL, sack
- WISC – John Torchio – 3 tackles, TFL, 0.5 sack

=== at UMass ===
	1	2	3	4	Total
Eagles	14	7	7	14	42
Minutemen	0	7	7	14	28

Statistics	EMU	MASS
First downs	26	30
Total yards	507	519
Rushing yards	184	209
Passing yards	323	310
Turnovers	1	2
Time of possession	29:29	30:31

Team	Category	Player	Statistics
Eastern Michigan	Passing	Ben Bryant	14/21, 298 yards, TD
Eastern Michigan	Rushing	Jawon Hamilton	16 rushes, 122 yards, TD
Eastern Michigan	Receiving	Hassan Beydoun	6 receptions, 101 yards
UMass	Passing	Brady Olson	22/38, 285 yards, 2 TD, INT
UMass	Rushing	Ellis Merriweather	23 rushes, 144 yards
UMass	Receiving	Melvin Hill	4 receptions, 82 yards, TD

=== Texas State ===
Texas State at Eastern Michigan

Team	1	2	3	4	Total
Bobcats	7	7	7	0	21
• Eagles	14	14	10	21	59

- Date: September 25, 2021
- Location: Rynearson Stadium
  Ypsilanti, MI
- Game start: 1:05 p.m. CDT
- Elapsed time: 3 hours and 21 minutes
- Game attendance: 14,253
- Game weather: 64 °F (18 °C) • Weather: Sunny • Wind: NW 7 MPH
- Referee: Jeremy Valentine
- TV announcers (ESPN+): Anthony Lima (play–by–play) and Marcus Ray (analyst)

Scoring summary
1	08:06	EMU	Samson Evans 4-yard rush (Chad Ryland kick) (10 plays, 66 yards, 4:47)	EMU 7–0
1	03:23	EMU	Ben Bryant 39-yard rush (Chad Ryland kick) (6 plays, 85 yards, 2:12)	EMU 14–0
1	01:36	TXST	Javen Banks 5-yard pass from Brady McBride (Seth Keller kick) (5 plays, 38 yards, 1:37)	EMU 14–7
2	13:30	EMU	Dylan Drummond 12-yard pass from Ben Bryant (Chad Ryland kick) (8 plays, 74 yards, 2:49)	EMU 21–7
2	03:21	EMU	Thomas Odukoya 13-yard pass from Dylan Drummond (Chad Ryland kick) (7 plays, 55 yards, 2:32)	EMU 28–7
2	01:24	TXST	Trevis Graham Jr. 29-yard pass from Brady McBride (Seth Keller kick) (8 plays, 75 yards, 1:50)	EMU 28–14
3	10:56	TXST	Javen Banks 29-yard pass from Brady McBride (Seth Keller kick) (6 plays, 77 yards, 2:42)	EMU 28–21
3	08:14	EMU	Jawon Hamilton 22-yard rush (Chad Ryland kick) (6 plays, 57 yards, 2:35)	EMU 35–21
3	02:43	EMU	Chad Ryland 36-yard field goal (5 plays, 12 yards, 2:32)	EMU 38–21
4	12:16	EMU	Latrell Fordham 24-yard pass from Ben Bryant (Chad Ryland kick) (7 plays, 66 yards, 3:01)	EMU 45–21
4	08:08	EMU	Hassan Beydoun 4-yard pass from Ben Bryant (Chad Ryland kick) (5 plays, 27 yards, 2:19)	EMU 52–21
4	01:09	EMU	Samson Evans 2-yard rush (Chad Ryland kick) (9 plays, 54 yards, 5:44)	EMU 59–21

Statistics	Texas State	Eastern Michigan
First downs	18	33
Total yards	299	499
Rushing yards	112	242
Passing yards	187	257
Turnovers	1	0
Time of possession	25:52	34:08

Team	Category	Player	Statistics
Texas State	Passing	Brady McBride	16/25, 187 yards, 3 TDs
Texas State	Rushing	Brock Sturges	14 carries, 68 yards
Texas State	Receiving	Trevis Graham Jr.	4 receptions, 69 yards, 1 TD
Eastern Michigan	Passing	Ben Bryant	20/33, 228 yards, 3 TDs
Eastern Michigan	Rushing	Darius Boone Jr.	13 carries, 86 yards
Eastern Michigan	Receiving	Dylan Drummond	5 receptions, 59 yards, 1 TD

=== Miami (OH) ===
	1	2	3	4	Total
RedHawks	6	0	3	3	12
Eagles	0	10	3	0	13

Statistics	MIA	EMU
First downs	19	16
Total yards	385	257
Rushing yards	126	31
Passing yards	259	206
Turnovers	1	1
Time of possession	25:52	34:08

Team	Category	Player	Statistics
Miami	Passing	A. J. Mayer	16/39, 259 yards
Miami	Rushing	Tyre Shelton	9 rushes, 41 yards
Miami	Receiving	Jack Sorenson	7 receptions, 123 yards
Eastern Michigan	Passing	Ben Bryant	21/31, 206 yards, TD, INT
Eastern Michigan	Rushing	Darius Boone Jr.	9 rushes, 36 yards
Eastern Michigan	Receiving	Dylan Drummond	7 receptions, 93 yards

=== Ball State ===
Ball State at Eastern Michigan

Team	1	2	3	4	Total
• Ball State	14	3	7	14	38
Eastern Michigan	0	14	3	14	31

- Date: October 16. 2021
- Location: Rynearson Stadium
  Ypsilanti, MI
- Game start: 2:00 p.m. EST
- Game attendance: 15,258
- Television network: ESPN+

Statistics	Ball State	Eastern Michigan
First downs	29	27
Total yards	433	385
Rushing yards	200	46
Passing yards	233	339
Turnovers	0	2
Time of possession	32:43	27:17

Team	Category	Player	Statistics
Ball State	Passing	Drew Plitt	27/35, 207 yards, 1 TD
Ball State	Rushing	Carson Steele	18 carries, 138 yards, 1 TD
Ball State	Receiving	Justin Hall	10 receptions, 58 yards
Eastern Michigan	Passing	Ben Bryant	35/48, 331 yards, 1 TD, 2 INTs
Eastern Michigan	Rushing	Jawon Hamilton	8 carries, 40 yards
Eastern Michigan	Receiving	Dylan Drummond	7 receptions, 105 yards, 1 TD

=== at Central Michigan (Michigan MAC Trophy) ===
Michigan MAC Trophy

Team	1	2	3	4	Total
Eastern Michigan	0	3	7	0	10
• Central Michigan	7	3	7	14	31

- Date: November 26, 2021
- Location: Kelly/Shorts Stadium
  Mount Pleasant, MI
- Game start: 12:00 p.m. EST
- Game attendance: 7,708
- Television network: ESPNU

Statistics	Eastern Michigan	Central Michigan
First downs	15	22
Total yards	226	366
Rushing yards	5	236
Passing yards	221	130
Turnovers	1	1
Time of possession	27:17	32:43

Team	Category	Player	Statistics
Eastern Michigan	Passing	Ben Bryant	24/35, 221 yards
Eastern Michigan	Rushing	Bryson Moss	5 carries, 26 yards
Eastern Michigan	Receiving	Tanner Knue	7 receptions, 70 yards
Central Michigan	Passing	Daniel Richardson	12/24, 130 yards, 2 TDs, 1 INT
Central Michigan	Rushing	Lew Nichols III	44 carries, 194 yards, 1 TD
Central Michigan	Receiving	JaCorey Sullivan	4 receptions, 46 yards, 2 TDs

=== vs. Liberty (LendingTree Bowl) ===
Eastern Michigan Eagles vs. Liberty Flames (2021 LendingTree Bowl) – Game summary

Quarter	1	2	3	4	Total
Eagles	3	7	0	10	20
Flames	13	20	16	7	56

at Hancock Whitney Stadium, Mobile, Alabama

- Date: December 18
- Game time: 5:45 p.m. EST / 4:45 p.m. CST
- Game weather: Temperature: 71 °F (22 °C) • Weather: overcast, humid • Wind: N 7 MPH
- Game attendance: 15,186
- Referee: Trennis Livingston
- TV announcers (ESPN): Chris Cotter, Mark Herzlich and Jalyn Johnson

Game information

First quarter

- EMU – Chad Ryland 27-yard field goal, 7:48. Eagles 3–0. Drive: 14 plays, 66 yards, 7:12.
- LIB – D. J. Stubbs 54-yard pass from Malik Willis (Brayden Beck kick), 3:08. Flames 7–3. Drive: 5 plays, 85 yards, 1:32.
- LIB – Skyler Thomas 27-yard interception return (kick failed), 2:27. Flames 13–3.

Second quarter

- EMU – Samson Evans 2-yard run (Chad Ryland kick), 13:01. Flames 13–10. Drive: 10 plays, 75 yards, 4:26.
- LIB – T. J. Green 24-yard run (kick failed), 12:07. Flames 19–10. Drive: 3 plays, 75 yards, 0:54.
- LIB – Johnny Huntley 20-yard pass from Malik Willis (Brayden Beck kick), 6:22. Flames 26–10. Drive: 12 plays, 88 yards, 3:32.
- LIB – Malik Willis 2-yard run (Brayden Beck kick), 0:16. Flames 33–10. Drive: 6 plays, 63 yards, 1:56.

Third quarter

- LIB – Malik Willis 35-yard run (run failed), 11:02. Flames 39–10. Drive: 2 plays, 52 yards, 0:34.
- LIB – Brayden Beck 43-yard field goal, 7:08. Flames 42–10. Drive: 5 plays, 19 yards, 1:32.
- LIB – Demario Douglas 2-yard pass from Malik Willis (Brayden Beck kick), 2:44. Flames 49–10. Drive: 9 plays, 73 yards, 3:22.

Fourth quarter

- LIB – Kevin Shaa 64-yard pass from Johnathan Bennett (Brayden Beck kick), 10:58. Flames 56–10. Drive: 1 play, 64 yards, 0:08.
- EMU – Chad Ryland 43-yard field goal, 5:26. Flames 56–13. Drive: 12 plays, 58 yards, 5:32.
- EMU – Jeff Hubbard 34-yard interception return (Chad Ryland kick), 4:29. Flames 56–20.

Top passers

- EMU – Ben Bryant – 23/36, 200 yards, INT
- LIB – Malik Willis – 13/24, 231 yards, 3 TD

Top rushers

- EMU – Samson Evans – 13 rushes, 52 yards, TD
- LIB – T. J. Green – 8 rushes, 88 yards, TD

Top receivers

- EMU – Hassan Beydoun – 11 receptions, 83 yards
- LIB – Kevin Shaa – 3 receptions, 94 yards, TD
