= Clint Ratkovich =

American football player (born 1997)

No. 25
- Position: Fullback

Personal information
- Born: September 16, 1997 (age 29); Crete, Illinois, U.S.
- Listed height: 6 ft 1 in (1.85 m)
- Listed weight: 220 lb (100 kg)

Career information
- High school: Crete-Monee (Crete)
- College: Western Illinois (2017–2019); Northern Illinois (2021)
- NFL draft: 2022: undrafted

Career history
- Atlanta Falcons (2022)*; Saskatchewan Roughriders (2024)
- * Offseason or practice squad member only

Awards and highlights
- 2× First-team All-MVFC (2018–2019); Third-team All-MAC (2021)
- Stats at Pro Football Reference
- Stats at CFL.ca

Clint Ratkovich (born September 16, 1997) is an American former professional football fullback who played for the Saskatchewan Roughriders of the Canadian Football League (CFL). He played college football at Western Illinois and Northern Illinois. He was also a member of the Atlanta Falcons of the National Football League (NFL).

== Early life ==
Ratkovich was born on September 16, 1997, in Crete, Illinois. He played high school football at Crete-Monee High School in Crete, Illinois. He tallied 1,800 rushing yards and 36 total touchdowns his senior year, earning all-state honors.

== College career ==
Ratkovich first played college football for the Western Illinois Leathernecks from 2017 to 2019. He caught 128 passes for 1,204 yards and ten touchdowns while also rushing 97 times for 429 yards and three touchdowns in 35 games played for Western Illinois. He was named first team all-Missouri Valley Football Conference in both 2018 and 2019. After the COVID-19 pandemic impacted the 2020 FCS football season, Ratkovich decided to transfer to an FBS school.

He transferred to play for the Northern Illinois Huskies in 2021. He rushed 104 times for 461 yards and 13 touchdowns while also recording 15 receptions for 124 yards and two touchdowns. Ratkovich was named third team All-Mid-American Conference (MAC) by Phil Steele and honorable mention All-MAC by Pro Football Network that season.

== Professional career ==
Pre-draft measurables
Height	Weight	Arm length	Hand span	40-yard dash	10-yard split	20-yard split	20-yard shuttle	Three-cone drill	Vertical jump	Broad jump	Bench press
6 ft 0 1/2 in (1.84 m)	236 lb (107 kg)	30 1/8 in (0.77 m)	9 3/4 in (0.25 m)	4.67 s	1.66 s	2.62 s	4.32 s	7.13 s	34.0 in (0.86 m)	10 ft 2 in (3.10 m)	31 reps
All values from Pro Day

Ratkovich suffered a torn ACL while working out for the Green Bay Packers in April 2022. He went undrafted in the 2022 NFL draft. After healing from his injury, he was signed to the practice squad of the Atlanta Falcons on December 27, 2022. Ratkovich signed a futures contract with the Falcons on January 9, 2023. He was waived on August 29, 2023.

Ratkovich signed with the Saskatchewan Roughriders of the Canadian Football League (CFL) on February 13, 2024. He scored his first CFL touchdown, and the only touchdown of the game, in the Roughriders' 19–9 win over the Winnipeg Blue Bombers in Week 7. He was moved to the practice roster on August 21, promoted to the active roster on August 31, and moved back to the practice roster on September 19. Overall, he dressed in 12 games during the 2024 season, rushing five times for eight yards while also catching six passes for 58 yards and one touchdown on seven targets. Ratkovich became a free agent after the season.
