= Dante Cephas =

American football player (born 2001)

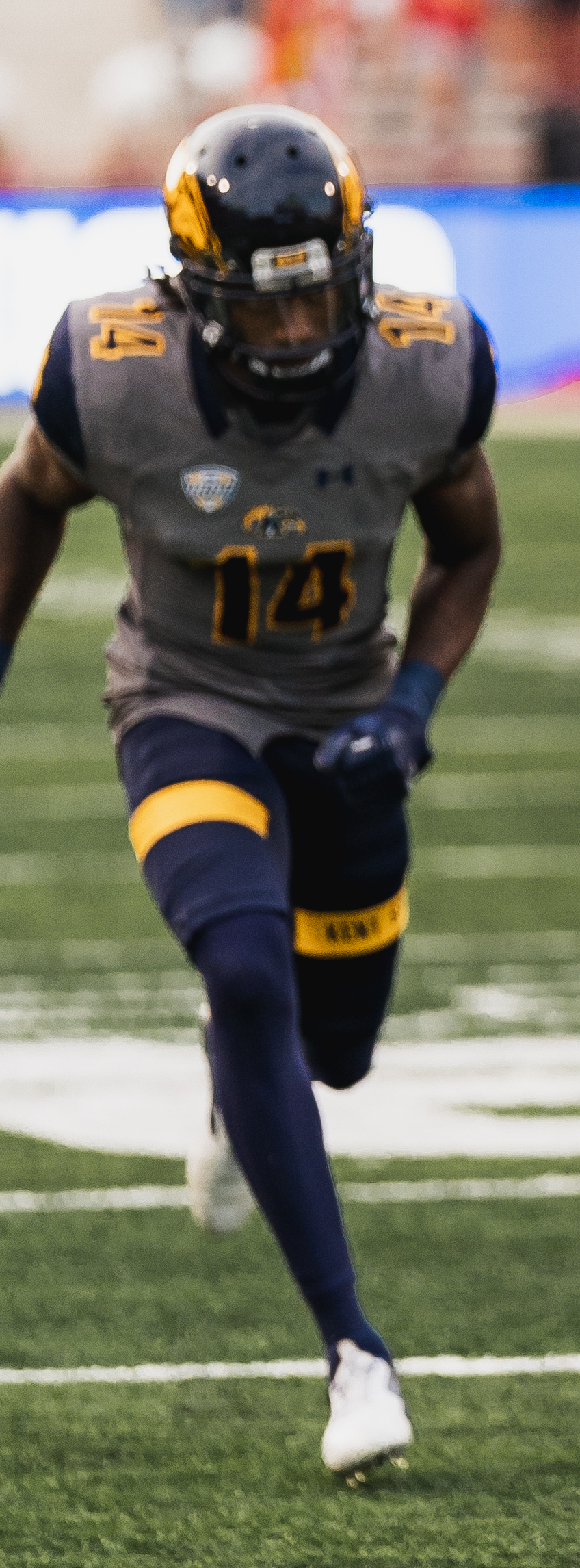
- Cephas with Kent State in 2021

No. 14 – Kansas State Wildcats
- Position: Wide receiver
- Class: Redshirt Senior

Personal information
- Born: January 15, 2001 (age 25); Pittsburgh, Pennsylvania, U.S.
- Listed height: 6 ft 0 in (1.83 m)
- Listed weight: 191 lb (87 kg)

Career information
- High school: Penn Hills (Pittsburgh, Pennsylvania)
- College: Kent State (2019–2022); Penn State (2023); Kansas State (2024–present)

Awards and highlights
- 2× First-team All-MAC (2021, 2022)
- Stats at ESPN

Dante Lamar Cephas (born January 15, 2001) is an American college football wide receiver for the Kansas State Wildcats. He previously played for the Kent State Golden Flashes and the Penn State Nittany Lions.

== Early life ==
Cephas grew up in Pittsburgh, Pennsylvania, and attended Penn Hills High School. He was rated a three-star recruit and committed to play college football at Kent State.

== College career ==
=== Kent State (2019–2022) ===
Cephas played in three games and had four receptions for 19 yards as a true freshman before redshirting the season. He caught 11 passes for 136 yards over four games during Kent State's COVID-19-shortened 2020 season. Cephas was named first-team All-Mid-American Conference (MAC) as a redshirt sophomore after catching 82 passes for 1,240 yards and nine touchdowns as a redshirt sophomore. Cephas repeated as a first-team All-MAC selection after finishing the 2022 regular season with 48 receptions for 744 yards and three touchdowns. Following the end of the season he entered the NCAA transfer portal.

=== Penn State (2023) ===
On January 15, 2023, Cephas announced his intent to transfer to Penn State following completion of his undergraduate degree at Kent State. On November 4, 2023, Cephas had a season high 6 receptions for 53 yards and two touchdowns against Maryland.

=== Kansas State (2024–present) ===
On January 4, 2024, Cephas announced he was going to enter the transfer portal again. On January 20, he announced that he would transfer to Kansas State.

=== Statistics ===
Season	Team	Games		Receiving			
Season	Team	GP	GS	Rec	Yds	Avg	TD
2019	Kent State	3	1	4	19	4.8	0
2020	Kent State	4	3	11	136	12.4	0
2021	Kent State	14	13	82	1,240	15.1	9
2022	Kent State	9	8	48	744	15.5	3
2023	Penn State	12	6	22	146	11.2	2
2024	Kansas State	13	6	15	184	12.3	0
Career		55	37	182	2,569	14.1	14

== Professional career ==
Pre-draft measurables
Height	Weight	40-yard dash	20-yard shuttle	Three-cone drill	Vertical jump	Broad jump	Bench press
6 ft 0 1/4 in (1.84 m)	191 lb (87 kg)	4.58 s	4.33 s	6.94 s	37.5 in (0.95 m)	10 ft 7 in (3.23 m)	7 reps
All values from Pro Day
