= Dustin Crum =

American gridiron football player (born 1999)

- Crum with the Montreal Alouettes in 2026

No. 16 – Montreal Alouettes
- Position: Quarterback
- Roster status: Active
- CFL status: American

Personal information
- Born: January 5, 1999 (age 27); Grafton, Ohio, U.S.
- Listed height: 6 ft 1 in (1.85 m)
- Listed weight: 210 lb (95 kg)

Career information
- High school: Midview (Grafton, Ohio)
- College: Kent State (2017–2021)
- NFL draft: 2022: undrafted

Career history
- Kansas City Chiefs (2022)*; Ottawa Redblacks (2022–2025); Montreal Alouettes (2026–present)
- * Offseason or practice squad member only

Awards and highlights
- MAC Most Valuable Player (2021); MAC Offensive Player of the Year (2021); 2× First-team All-MAC (2020, 2021); Frisco Bowl MVP (2019)

Career CFL statistics as of 2026
- Completions-attempts: 493–703
- TD–INT: 17–16
- Passing yards: 5,471
- Rushing yards: 1,443
- Rushing touchdowns: 32
- Stats at CFL.ca
- Stats at Pro Football Reference

Dustin Crum (born January 5, 1999) is an American professional football quarterback for the Montreal Alouettes of the Canadian Football League (CFL). He played college football at Kent State. Crum has also been a member of the Kansas City Chiefs of the National Football League (NFL).

== Early life ==
Crum grew up in Grafton, Ohio and attended Midview High School, where he played baseball, basketball and football. As a senior he completed 173 of 279 passes for 2,615 yards and 32 touchdowns while also rushing for 1,557 yards and 14 touchdowns and was named Division II All-Ohio First-team and a finalist for Mr. Ohio Football.

== College career ==
Crum completed 16-of-30 passes for 232 yards, one touchdown and two interceptions as a freshman. As a sophomore, he completed 16-of-27 passes for 176 yards and two touchdowns. He started the last twelve games of his junior season and passed for 2,625 yards and 20 touchdowns against 2 interceptions while also rushing for 707 yards and 6 touchdowns. Crum was named the MVP of the 2019 Frisco Bowl after passing for 289 yards and two touchdowns and rushing for a career-high 147 yards and a touchdown on 23 carries in the first bowl victory in Kent State's history.

Crum entered his senior season on the watchlists for the Davey O'Brien and Manning Awards. He was named first-team All-Mid-American Conference (MAC) as a senior after passing 1,182 yards and 12 touchdowns over four games during the team's COVID-19-shortened 2020 season. Crum decided to utilize the extra year of eligibility granted to college athletes who played in the 2020 season due to the coronavirus pandemic and return to Kent State for a fifth season In his final season at Kent State, he was named the MAC Most Valuable Player after passing for 3,187 yards with 20 touchdowns and six interceptions rushing for 703 yards and 12 touchdowns on 161 carries.

== Professional career ==
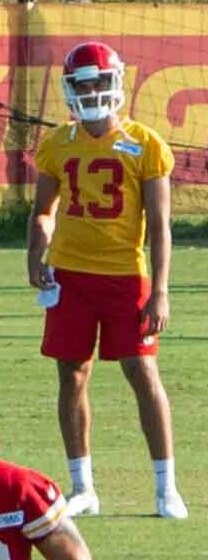
Crum with the Kansas City Chiefs in 2022

Pre-draft measurables
Height	Weight	Arm length	Hand span	Wingspan	40-yard dash	10-yard split	20-yard split	20-yard shuttle	Vertical jump	Broad jump
6 ft 1 in (1.85 m)	210 lb (95 kg)	31 3/4 in (0.81 m)	9 3/8 in (0.24 m)	6 ft 5 3/8 in (1.97 m)	4.75 s	1.63 s	2.74 s	4.36 s	32.5 in (0.83 m)	10 ft 0 in (3.05 m)
All values from NFL Combine

=== Kansas City Chiefs ===
Crum was signed by the Kansas City Chiefs as an undrafted free agent on April 30, 2022, shortly after the conclusion of the 2022 NFL draft. He was waived by the Chiefs on August 27.

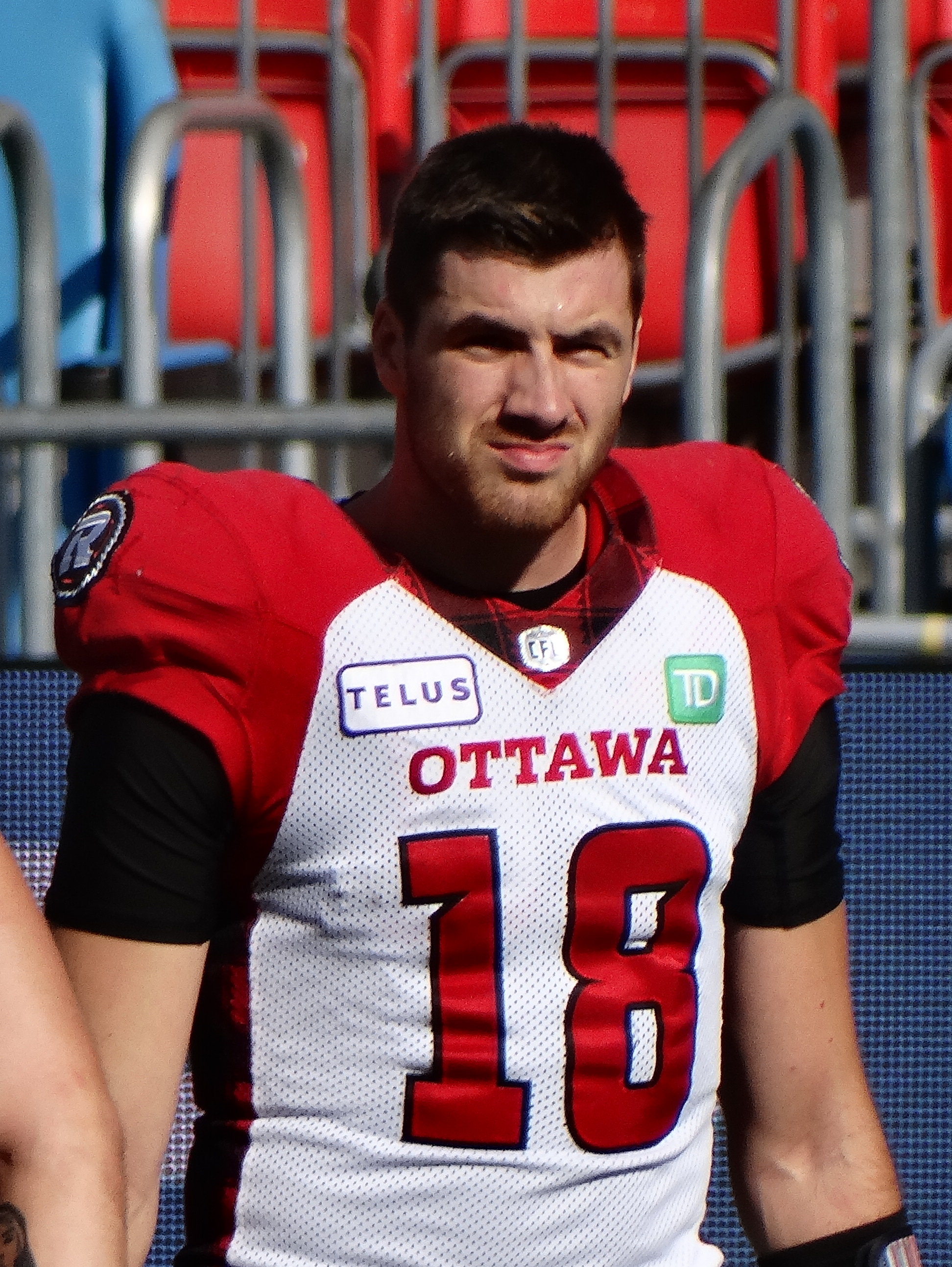
Crum with the Ottawa Redblacks in 2024

=== Ottawa Redblacks ===
On September 6, 2022, Crum signed with the Ottawa Redblacks of the Canadian Football League (CFL) midway through the 2022 CFL season. Following the season he and the Redblacks agreed to a contract extension. He began the 2023 season as a depth quarterback on the roster, behind Jeremiah Masoli, Nick Arbuckle, and Tyrie Adams. Crum saw his first playing time in Week 5 of the season when all the other quarterbacks were either injured or ineffective, he completed 14 of 21 passing attempts for 149 yards and ran the ball six times for 91 yards and a touchdown, but also had three turnovers. With starting quarterback Masoli injured head coach Bob Dyce announced Crum as the starting quarterback for the team's Week 6 match against the Blue Bombers. After a slow start to the game Crum managed to engineer a comeback win for the Redblacks scoring a 12-yard rushing touchdown with no time remaining, and the subsequent two point conversion to tie the game. In overtime he scrambled for a 29-yard go ahead touchdown. The following week he threw for 257 yards with two passing touchdowns and added 63 yards on the ground to beat the Calgary Stampeders 43-41 on the road in overtime.

Crum became a free agent upon the expiry of his contract on February 10, 2026.

=== Montreal Alouettes ===
It was announced on February 10, 2026, that Crum had signed with the Montreal Alouettes. Through Week 19, he had five rushing touchdowns as the team's short-yardage quarterback. With Davis Alexander resting for the playoffs, Crum made his first start for the Alouettes in Week 21.

== Career statistics ==
Legend
Led the league

=== CFL ===
Year	Team	Games			Passing								Rushing			
Year	Team	GD	GS	Record	Cmp	Att	Pct	Yds	Y/A	TD	Int	Rtg	Att	Yds	Y/A	TD
2023	OTT	18	14	3–11	266	385	69.1	3,109	8.1	10	12	89.0	97	741	7.6	9
2024	OTT	18	0	—	31	45	68.9	320	7.1	0	2	70.6	39	206	5.3	7
2025	OTT	17	6	2–4	166	234	70.9	1,771	7.6	6	2	97.7	78	429	5.5	11
2026	MTL	18	2	1–1	47	59	79.7	424	7.2	1	0	102.3	26	79	3.0	7
Career		71	22	6–16	510	724	70.4	5,624	7.8	17	16	91.8	239	1,426	6.0	34

=== College ===
Season	Team	Games			Passing								Rushing			
Season	Team	GP	GS	Record	Cmp	Att	Pct	Yds	Y/A	TD	Int	Rtg	Att	Yds	Avg	TD
2017	Kent State	10	2	1–1	16	30	53.3	232	7.7	1	2	116.0	85	310	3.6	1
2018	Kent State	9	0	—	16	27	59.3	176	6.5	2	0	138.5	19	111	5.8	1
2019	Kent State	13	12	7–5	216	312	69.2	2,622	8.4	20	2	159.7	168	707	4.2	6
2020	Kent State	4	4	3–1	83	113	73.5	1,181	10.5	12	2	192.7	44	240	5.5	0
2021	Kent State	14	14	7–7	244	381	64.0	3,206	8.4	20	6	148.9	161	703	4.4	1
Career		50	32	18–14	575	863	66.6	7,417	8.6	55	12	157.1	477	2,071	4.3	24
