= 2021 Washington State Cougars football team =

American college football season

2021 Washington State Cougars football

Sun Bowl, L 21–24 vs. Central Michigan
- Conference: Pac–12 Conference
- North Division
- Record: 7–6 (6–3 Pac-12)
- Head coach: Nick Rolovich (2nd season; first 7 games); Jake Dickert (remaining 6 games)
- Offensive coordinator: Brian Smith (2nd season)
- Co-offensive coordinator: Craig Stutzmann (2nd season)
- Offensive scheme: Run and shoot
- Defensive coordinator: Jake Dickert (2nd season)
- Base defense: 4–2–5
- Home stadium: Martin Stadium

2021 Pac-12 Conference football standings
	Conf.			Overall
Team	W		L	W		L
North Division
No. 22 Oregon xy	7	–	2	10	–	4
Washington State	6	–	3	7	–	6
Oregon State	5	–	4	7	–	6
California	4	–	5	5	–	7
Washington	3	–	6	4	–	8
Stanford	2	–	7	3	–	9
South Division
No. 12 Utah xy$	8	–	1	10	–	4
UCLA	6	–	3	8	–	4
Arizona State†	0	–	3	0	–	5
USC	3	–	6	4	–	8
Colorado	3	–	6	4	–	8
Arizona	1	–	8	1	–	11
Championship: Utah 38, Oregon 10
$ – Conference champion; x – Division champion/co-champions; y – Championship game participant; Rankings from AP Poll

The 2021 Washington State Cougars football team represented Washington State University during the 2021 NCAA Division I FBS football season. They were led by second-year head coach Nick Rolovich for the first seven games of the season. Rolovich was fired on October 18 after refusing to comply with Washington's COVID-19 vaccination mandate. Defensive coordinator Jake Dickert took over as the team's interim head coach for the remainder of the season. He was announced as the Cougars 34th head coach following their Apple Cup victory in November. The team played their home games in Martin Stadium in Pullman, Washington, and competed as members of the North Division of the Pac-12 Conference.

After finishing the regular season with an overall record of 7–5, the Cougars accepted an invitation to the Sun Bowl, to face the Miami Hurricanes. On December 26, the Hurricanes announced that they would not be able to play, due to COVID-19 issues; organizers stated that they would try to secure a replacement team to face the Cougars. On December 27, the Central Michigan Chippewas were named as the Sun Bowl replacement team. The Chippewas had originally been scheduled to face the Boise State Broncos in the Arizona Bowl, until the Broncos had to withdraw due to COVID-19 issues and the Arizona Bowl was canceled.

== Schedule ==
Date	Time	Opponent	Site	TV	Result	Attendance
September 4	8:00 p.m.	Utah State*	Martin Stadium; Pullman, WA	P12N	L 23–26	24,944
September 11	3:00 p.m.	Portland State*	Martin Stadium; Pullman, WA	P12N	W 44–24	22,651
September 18	12:30 p.m.	USC	Martin Stadium; Pullman, WA	FOX	L 14–45	24,714
September 25	11:30 a.m.	at Utah	Rice–Eccles Stadium; Salt Lake City, UT	P12N	L 13–24	51,483
October 2	2:30 p.m.	at California	California Memorial Stadium; Berkeley, CA	P12N	W 21–6	40,286
October 9	1:00 p.m.	Oregon State^{†}	Martin Stadium; Pullman, WA	P12N	W 31–24	24,157
October 16	4:30 p.m.	Stanford	Martin Stadium; Pullman, WA	ESPNU	W 34–31	26,171
October 23	12:30 p.m.	BYU*	Martin Stadium; Pullman, WA	FS1	L 19–21	22,541
October 30	12:00 p.m.	at Arizona State	Sun Devil Stadium; Tempe, AZ	FS1	W 34–21	46,136
November 13	7:30 p.m.	at No. 3 Oregon	Autzen Stadium; Eugene, OR	ESPN	L 24–38	52,327
November 19	6:00 p.m.	Arizona	Martin Stadium; Pullman, WA	P12N	W 44–18	22,541
November 26	5:00 p.m.	at Washington	Husky Stadium; Seattle, WA (Apple Cup)	FS1	W 40–13	68,077
December 31	9:00 a.m.	vs. Central Michigan*	Sun Bowl; El Paso, TX (Sun Bowl)	CBS	L 21–24	34,540
*Non-conference game; ^{†}Homecoming; Rankings from AP Poll; All times are in Pacific time

== Game summaries ==
=== vs Utah State ===
Utah State Aggies vs Washington State Cougars - Game summary

Quarter	1	2	3	4	Total
Aggies	3	2	6	15	26
Cougars	0	6	14	3	23

at Martin Stadium, Pullman, WA

- Date: September 4, 2021
- Game time: 8:00 p.m. PDT
- Game weather: 73 °F (23 °C) Sunny
- Game attendance: 24,944
- Referee: Mike Cuttone
- TV announcers (P12N): Jordan Kent (Play-by-Play), Bob Davie (Analyst)

Game information

First quarter

- USU – Connor Coles 23-yard field goal, 4:40. Utah State 3–0. Drive: 11 plays, 77 yards, 3:53.

Second quarter

- WSU – Dean Janikowski 35-yard field goal, 14:57. Tied 3–3. Drive: 10 plays, 57 yards, 4:43.
- USU – Patrick Joyner Jr. 0-yard safety, 11:08. Utah State 5–3.
- WSU – Dean Janikowski 26-yard field goal, 0:54. Washington State 6–5. Drive: 6 plays, 19 yards, 1:28.

Third quarter

- USU – Connor Coles 39-yard field goal, 11:40. Utah State 8–6. Drive: 10 plays, 50 yards, 3:12.
- WSU – Max Borghi 64-yard run (Dean Janikowski kick), 10:47. Washington State 13–8. Drive: 3 plays, 80 yards, 0:46.
- USU – Connor Coles 28-yard field goal, 7:23. Washington State 13–11. Drive: 11 plays, 51 yards, 3:18.
- WSU – Donovan Ollie 12-yard pass from Jayden de Laura (Dean Janikowski kick), 4:01. Washington State 20–11. Drive: 8 plays, 69 yards, 3:16.

Fourth quarter

- WSU – Dean Janikowski 27-yard field goal, 12:11. Washington State 23–11. Drive: 9 plays, 62 yards, 4:45.
- USU – Calvin Tyler Jr. 2-yard run (Connor Coles kick), 5:25. Washington State 23–18. Drive: 14 plays, 70 yards, 6:38.
- USU – Deven Thompkins 7-yard pass from Logan Bonner (Logan Bonner–Derek Wright pass), 0:11. Utah State 26–23. Drive: 10 plays, 78 yards, 2:51.

Top passers

- USU – Logan Bonner – 17/24, 143 yards, TD, int
- WSU – Jayden de Laura – 12/22, 155 yards, TD

Top rushers

- USU – Calvin Tyler Jr. – 14 rushes, 84 yards, TD
- WSU – Max Borghi – 11 rushes, 86 yards, TD

Top receivers

- USU – Deven Thompkins – 8 receptions, 94 yards, TD
- WSU – Calvin Jackson Jr. – 7 receptions, 91 yards

=== vs Portland State ===
Portland State Vikings vs Washington State Cougars - Game summary

Quarter	1	2	3	4	Total
Vikings	0	10	0	14	24
Cougars	7	23	7	7	44

at Martin Stadium, Pullman, WA

- Date: September 11, 2021
- Game time: 3:00 p.m. PDT
- Game weather: 69 °F (21 °C) Sunny
- Game attendance: 22,651
- Referee: Mark Duddy
- TV announcers (P12N): Greg Heister, Lincoln Kennedy

Game information

First quarter

- WSU – Calvin Jackson Jr. 22-yard pass from Jayden de Laura (Dean Janikowski kick), 9:42. Washington State 7–0. Drive: 4 plays, 50 yards, 2:05.

Second quarter

- PRST – Davis Alexander 1-yard run (Cody Williams kick), 10:25. Tied 7–7. Drive: 12 plays, 79 yards, 6:15.
- WSU – Jayden de Laura 10-yard run (Dean Janikowski kick), 9:10. Washington State 14–7. Drive: 3 plays, 46 yards, 1:05.
- WSU – Deon McIntosh 16-yard run (Dean Janikowski kick), 5:12. Washington State 21–7. Drive: 7 plays, 80 yards, 2:11.
- PRST – Cody Williams 46-yard field goal, 3:07. Washington State 21–10. Drive: 7 plays, 36 yards, 2:05.
- WSU – Travell Harris 19-yard pass from Jayden de Laura (kick failed), 1:07. Washington State 27–10. Drive: 6 plays, 73 yards, 1:59.
- WSU – Dean Janikowski 23-yard field goal, 0:00. Washington State 30–10. Drive: 5 plays, 34 yards, 0:30.

Third quarter

- WSU – Max Borghi 1-yard run (Dean Janikowski kick), 2:13. Washington State 37–10. Drive: 6 plays, 66 yards, 2:20.

Fourth quarter

- PRST – Beau Kelly 39-yard pass from Davis Alexander (Cody Williams kick), 6:34. Washington State 37–17. Drive: 6 plays, 56 yards, 2:57.
- WSU – Travell Harris 13-yard pass from Jayden de Laura (Dean Janikowski kick), 2:02. Washington State 44–17. Drive: 8 plays, 43 yards, 4:29.
- PRST – Nate Bennett 3-yard pass from Davis Alexander (Cody Williams kick), 0:23. Washington State 44–24. Drive: 9 plays, 75 yards, 1:39.

Top passers

- PRST – Davis Alexander – 27/49, 293 yards, 2 TD, int
- WSU – Jayden de Laura – 21/29, 303 yards, 3 TD, int

Top rushers

- PRST – Davis Alexander – 13 rushes, 62 yards, TD
- WSU – Deon McIntosh – 8 rushes, 64 yards, TD

Top receivers

- PRST – Beau Kelly – 10 receptions, 152 yards, TD
- WSU – Travell Harris – 6 receptions, 80 yards, 2 TD

=== vs USC ===
USC Trojans vs Washington State Cougars - Game summary

Quarter	1	2	3	4	Total
Trojans	0	7	28	10	45
Cougars	7	7	0	0	14

at Martin Stadium, Pullman, WA

- Date: September 18, 2021
- Game time: 12:30 p.m. PDT
- Game attendance: -
- Referee: Chris Coyte
- TV announcers (FOX): Joe Davis (play-by-play) and Brock Huard (analyst)

=== At Utah ===
Washington State Cougars at Utah Utes - Game summary

Quarter	1	2	3	4	Total
Cougars	0	6	7	0	13
Utes	0	7	3	14	24

at Rice-Eccles Stadium, Salt Lake City, UT

- Date: September 25, 2021
- Game time: 11:30 a.m. PDT
- Game weather: Sunny, Wind: 3 west, Temperature: 77 °F (25 °C)
- Game attendance: 51,483
- Referee: Stephen Strimling
- TV announcers (P12N): Roxy Bernstein (play-by-play), Lincoln Kennedy (analyst)

Game information

First quarter

- No scoring plays

Second quarter

- WSU – Dean Janikowski 39-yard field goal, 10:34. Washington State 3–0. Drive: 11 plays, 58 yards, 5:55.
- UTAH – Ja'Quinden Jackson 2-yard run (Jadon Redding kick), 4:14. Utah 7–3. Drive: 6 plays, 80 yards, 2:18.
- WSU – Dean Janikowski 20-yard field goal, 0:00. Utah 7–6. Drive: 13 plays, 71 yards, 4:14.

Third quarter

- WSU – De'Zhaun Stribling 26-yard pass from Jarrett Guarantano (Dean Janikowski kick), 13:40. Washington State 13–7. Drive: 2 plays, 21 yards, 1:15.
- UTAH – Jadon Redding 28-yard field goal, 9:15. Washington State 13–10. Drive: 12 plays, 64 yards, 4:25.

Fourth quarter

- UTAH – T.J. Pledger 20-yard run (Jordan Noyes kick), 4:43. Utah 17–13. Drive: 8 plays, 72 yards, 3:59.
- UTAH – Clark Phillips III 54-yard interception return (Jordan Noyes kick), 2:19. Utah 24–13.

Top passers

- WSU – Jarrett Guarantano – 25/36, 248 yards, TD, 3 INT
- UTAH – Cameron Rising – 13/23, 137 yards

Top rushers

- WSU – Deon McIntosh – 13 carries, 59 yards
- UTAH – T.J. Pledger – 10 carries, 117 yards, TD

Top receivers

- WSU – De'Zhaun Stribling – 6 receptions, 93 yards, TD
- UTAH – Cole Fotheringham – 3 receptions, 33 yards

=== At California ===
Washington State Cougars at California Golden Bears - Game summary

Quarter	1	2	3	4	Total
Cougars	14	0	7	0	21
Golden Bears	6	0	0	0	6

at California Memorial Stadium, Berkeley, CA

- Date: October 2, 2021
- Game time: 2:30 p.m. PDT
- Game weather: 82 °F (28 °C)
- Game attendance: 40,286
- Referee: Francisco Villar
- TV announcers (P12N): Matt Chazanow (play-by-play), Alex Brink (analyst), Jessamyn McIntyre (sideline)

=== vs Oregon State ===
Oregon State Beavers vs Washington State Cougars - Game summary

Quarter	1	2	3	4	Total
Beavers	0	10	7	7	24
Cougars	0	3	14	14	31

at Martin Stadium, Pullman, WA

- Date: October 9, 2021
- Game time: 1:00 p.m. PDT
- Game weather: 58 °F (14 °C)
- Game attendance: 24,157
- Referee: Mike McCabe
- TV announcers (P12N): Ted Robinson (play-by-play), Yogi Roth, (analyst)

Game information

First quarter
Second quarter
Third quarter
Fourth quarter

Top passers

- OSU – Chance Nolan – 11/25, 158 yards, 2 INT
- WSU – Jayden de Laura – 7/15, 48 yards, INT

Top rushers

- OSU – B. J. Baylor – 18 rushes, 145 yards
- WSU – Deon McIntosh – 13 rushes, 65 yards

Top receivers

- OSU – Champ Flemings – 2 receptions, 38 yards
- WSU – Travell Harris – 8 reception, 147 yards

=== vs Stanford ===
Stanford Cardinal vs Washington State Cougars - Game summary

Quarter	1	2	3	4	Total
Cardinal	13	3	0	15	31
Cougars	0	20	7	7	34

at Martin Stadium, Pullman, WA

- Date: October 16, 2021
- Game time: 4:30 p.m. PDT
- Game weather: Sunny, 68 °F (20 °C)
- Game attendance: 26,171
- Referee: Micheal Mothershed
- TV announcers (ESPNU): Kevin Brown, Hutson Mason

Game information

First quarter

- STAN – Benjamin Yurosek 45-yard pass from Tanner McKee (Joshua Karty kick), 11:10. Stanford 7–0. Drive: 7 plays, 75 yards, 3:50.
- STAN – Joshua Karty 51-yard field goal, 4:45. Stanford 10–0. Drive: 5 plays, 15 yards, 1:10.
- STAN – Joshua Karty 32-yard field goal, 0:13. Stanford 13–0. Drive: 8 plays, 33 yards, 3:36.

Second quarter

- WSU – Travell Harris 32-yard pass from Jayden de Laura (Dean Janikowski kick), 13:24. Stanford 13–7. Drive: 3 plays, 70 yards, 1:49.
- WSU – Calvin Jackson Jr. 31-yard pass from Jayden de Laura (kick blocked), 9:21. Tied 13–13. Drive: 6 plays, 70 yards, 2:58.
- WSU – De'Zhaun Stribling 10-yard pass from Jayden de Laura (Dean Janikowski kick), 3:07. Washington State 20–13. Drive: 1 play, 10 yards, 0:07.
- STAN – Joshua Karty 31-yard field goal, 0:39. Washington State 20–16. Drive: 8 plays, 62 yards, 2:28.

Third quarter

- WSU – Max Borghi 2-yard run (Dean Janikowski kick), 4:34. Washington State 27–16. Drive: 7 plays, 66 yards, 3:29.

Fourth quarter

- STAN – Tanner McKee 1-yard run (Tanner McKee run), 14:06. Washington State 27–24. Drive: 9 plays, 74 yards, 5:28.
- STAN – Austin Jones 8-yard pass from Tanner McKee (Joshua Karty kick), 7:32. Stanford 31–27. Drive: 11 plays, 85 yards, 5:28.
- WSU – Max Borghi 2-yard run (Dean Janikowski kick), 1:30. Washington State 34–31. Drive: 6 plays, 70 yards, 1:56.

Top passers

- STAN – Tanner McKee – 23/32, 273 yards, 2 TD
- WSU – Jayden de Laura – 17/30, 289 yards, 3 TD

Top rushers

- STAN – Nathaniel Peat – 10 rushes, 27 yards
- WSU – Max Borghi – 17 rushes, 89 yards, 2 TD

Top receivers

- STAN – Benjamin Yurosek – 5 receptions, 99 yards, TD
- WSU – Lincoln Victor – 2 receptions, 73 yards

=== vs BYU ===
BYU Cougars vs Washington State Cougars - Game summary

Quarter	1	2	3	4	Total
BYU Cougars	7	0	7	7	21
WSU Cougars	7	0	6	6	19

at Martin Stadium, Pullman, WA

- Date: October 23, 2021
- Game time: 12:30 p.m. PDT
- Game weather: Cloudy; 51 °F (11 °C), Winds SE 7 mph
- Game attendance: 22,541
- Referee: Kevin Hassell
- TV announcers (FS1): Cory Provus, Mark Helfrich

Game information

First quarter

- WSU – Max Borghi 11-yard run (Dean Janikowski kick), 9:36. Washington State 7–0. Drive: 10 plays, 75 yards, 5:24.
- BYU – Lopini Katoa 3-yard run (Jake Oldroyd kick), 9:36. Tied 7–7. Drive: 9 plays, 75 yards, 3:25.

Second quarter

No scoring

Third quarter

- BYU – Tyler Allgeier 11-yard run (Jake Oldroyd kick), 9:48. BYU 14–7. Drive: 11 plays, 75 yards, 5:12.
- WSU – Max Borghi 1-yard run (2-point pass from Nick Haberer incomplete after Haberer dropped the snap), 5:08. BYU 14–13. Drive: 10 plays, 69 yards, 4:34.

Fourth quarter

- BYU – Tyler Allgeier 2-yard run (Jake Oldroyd kick), 14:59. BYU 21–13. Drive: 11 plays, 81 yards, 5:02.
- WSU – Max Borghi 1-yard run (2-point pass from Lincoln Victor incomplete), 4:14. BYU 21–19. Drive: 11 plays, 76 yards, 5:59.

Top passers

- BYU – Jaren Hall – 15/20, 143 yards
- WSU – Jayden de Laura – 26/37, 257 yards, INT

Top rushers

- BYU – Tyler Allgeier – 32 carries, 191 yards, 2 TD
- WSU – Max Borghi – 18 carries, 83 yards, 3 TD

Top receivers

- BYU – Neil Pau'u – 6 receptions, 70 yards
- WSU – Travell Harris – 7 receptions, 60 yards

=== At Arizona State ===
Washington State Cougars vs Arizona State Sun Devils - Game summary

Quarter	1	2	3	4	Total
Cougars	14	14	0	6	34
Sun Devils	0	7	0	14	21

at Sun Devil Stadium, Tempe, AZ

- Date: October 30, 2021
- Game time: 12:00 p.m. PDT
- Game attendance: 46,136
- Referee: Matthew Richards
- TV announcers (FS1): Cory Provus, Mark Helfrich

=== At No. 3 Oregon ===
Washington State Cougars vs Oregon Ducks - Game summary

Quarter	1	2	3	4	Total
Cougars	0	14	0	10	24
No. 3 Ducks	14	0	10	14	38

at Autzen Stadium, Eugene, OR

- Date: November 13, 2021
- Game time: 7:40 p.m.
- Game weather: 57,858 °F (32,126 °C); Sunny;
- Game attendance: 52,327
- Referee: Mark Duddy
- TV announcers (ESPN): Dave Flemming, Rod Gilmore, Stormy Buonantony

Game information

First quarter

- (3:51) ORE – Travis Dye 1-yard run, Camden Lewis kick (Drive: 11 plays, 75 yards, 5:45; Oregon 7–0)
- (2:04) ORE – Travis Dye 11-yard pass from Anthony Brown, Camden Lewis kick (Drive: 4 plays, 40 yards, 1:40; Oregon 14–0)

Second quarter

- (6:52) WSU – De'Zhaun Stribling 14-yard pass from Jayden de Laura, Dean Janikowski kick (Drive: 6 plays, 46 yards, 2:16; Oregon 14–7)
- (0:11) WSU – Jayden de Laura 1-yard run, Dean Janikowski kick (Drive: 12 plays, 73 yards, 4:38; Oregon 14–14)

Third quarter

- (12:52) ORE – Anthony Brown 17-yard run, Camden Lewis kick (Drive: 5 plays, 43 yards, 2:08; Oregon 21–14)
- (2:54) ORE – Camden Lewis 22-yard field goal (Drive: 13 plays, 91 yards, 7:03; Oregon 24–14)

Fourth quarter

- (8:31) WSU – Dean Janikowski 34-yard field goal (Drive: 5 plays, 33 yards, 1:57; Oregon 24–17)
- (5:52) ORE – Byron Cardwell 27-yard run, Camden Lewis kick (Drive: 5 plays, 66 yards, 2:39; Oregon 31–17)
- (2:07) ORE – Byron Cardwell 22-yard run, Camden Lewis kick (Drive: 4 plays, 32 yards, 1:46; Oregon 38–17)
- (0:09) WSU – Travell Harris 2-yard pass from Jayden de Laura, Dean Janikowski kick (Drive: 6 plays, 61 yards, 1:58; Oregon 38–24)

Top passers

- WSU – Jayden de Laura – 20/36, 280 yards, 2 TD, 2 INT
- ORE – Anthony Brown – 17/22, 135 yards, TD

Top rushers

- WSU – Deon McIntosh – 9 carries, 57 yards
- ORE – Anthony Brown – 17 carries, 123 yards, TD

Top receivers

- WSU – Travell Harris – 8 receptions, 109 yards, TD
- ORE – Johnny Johnson III – 3 receptions, 43 yards

=== vs Arizona ===
Arizona Wildcats vs Washington State Cougars - Game summary

Quarter	1	2	3	4	Total
Wildcats	0	7	3	8	18
Cougars	7	14	16	7	44

at Martin Stadium, Pullman, WA

- Date: November 19th, 2021
- Game time: 6:10 p.m. PST
- Game weather: Light snow, 32 °F (0 °C)
- Game attendance: 22,541
- Referee: Matthew Richards
- TV announcers (P12N): JB Long, Maurice Jones-Drew

Game information

First quarter

- (7:11) WSU – Max Borghi 26-yard run, Dean Janikowski kick (Drive: 8 plays, 55 yards, 3:28; Washington State 7–0)

Second quarter

- (4:28) WSU – Travell Harris 8-yard pass from Jayden de Laura, Dean Janikowski kick (Drive: 7 plays, 69 yards, 3:13; Washington State 14–0)
- (2:22) ARIZ – Boobie Curry 11-yard pass from Will Plummer, Tyler Loop kick (Drive: 5 plays, 90 yards, 1:59; Washington State 14–7)
- (1:26) WSU – Calvin Jackson Jr. 43-yard pass from Jayden de Laura, Dean Janikowski kick (Drive: 3 plays, 75 yards, 0:56; Washington State 21–7)

Third quarter

- (10:07) WSU – Max Borghi 2-yard run, Dean Janikowski kick (Drive: 6 plays, 69 yards, 2:36; Washington State 28–7)
- (8:54) WSU – Team safety (Washington State 30–7)
- (7:10) WSU – Travell Harris 31-yard pass from Jayden de Laura, Dean Janikowski kick (Drive: 4 plays, 60 yards, 1:40; Washington State 37–7)
- (2:39) ARIZ – Tyler Loop 42-yard field goal (Drive: 11 plays, 51 yards, 4:31; Washington State 37–10)

Fourth quarter

- (12:16) ARIZ – Michael Wiley 27-yard pass from Will Plummer, Will Plummer two-point pass to Dorian Singer (Drive: 10 plays, 80 yards, 3:11; Washington State 37–18)
- (8:37) WSU – Calvin Jackson Jr. 78-yard pass from Jayden de Laura, Dean Janikowski kick (Drive: 2 plays, 78 yards, 0:17; Washington State 44–18)

Top passers

- ARIZ – Will Plummer – 23/42, 206 yards, 2 TD, INT
- WSU – Jayden de Laura – 13/23, 259 yards, 4 TD

Top rushers

- ARIZ – Drake Anderson – 8 carries, 92 yards
- WSU – Max Borghi – 16 carries, 139 yards, 2 TD

Top receivers

- ARIZ – Michael Wiley – 8 receptions, 87 yards, TD
- WSU – Calvin Jackson Jr. – 4 receptions, 133 yards, 2 TD

=== At Washington ===
Washington State Cougars vs Washington Huskies (Apple Cup) - Game summary

Quarter	1	2	3	4	Total
Cougars	10	3	10	17	40
Huskies	0	7	0	6	13

at Husky Stadium, Seattle, WA

- Date: November 26th, 2021
- Game time: 5:10 p.m.
- Game attendance: 68,077
- Referee: Michael Mothershed
- TV announcers (FS1): Alex Faust, Petros Padadakis

Game information

First quarter
Second quarter
Third quarter
Fourth quarter

Top passers

- WSU – Jayden de Laura – 27/32, 245 yards
- UW – Sam Huard – 17/31, 190 yards, TD, 4 INT

Top rushers

- WSU – Max Borghi – 22 carries, 129 yards, 2 TD
- UW – Kamari Pleasant – 8 carries, 34 yards, TD

Top receiving

- WSU – Donovan Ollie – 5 receptions, 68 yards
- UW – Rome Odunze – 3 receptions, 69 yards, TD

This was the Cougars' first victory over the Huskies since 2012, and their first at Husky Stadium since 2007.

=== Sun Bowl ===
Washington State Cougars vs Central Michigan Chippewas (Sun Bowl) - Game summary

Quarter	1	2	3	4	Total
Cougars	0	0	14	7	21
Chippewas	13	8	0	3	24

at Sun Bowl, El Paso, TX

- Date: December 31st, 2021
- Game time: 9:00 a.m. PST
- Game weather: Rain • Temperature: 46 °F (8 °C)
- Game attendance: 34,540
- Referee: Larry Smith
- TV announcers (CBS): Brad Nessler (play-by-play), Gary Danielson (Analyst), and Jamie Erdahl (Sideline)
- Box score

Game information

First quarter

- 6:51 CMU – Marshall Meeder 49-yard field goal. Drive: 6 plays, 51 yards, 2:20. Central Michigan 3–0
- 2:18 CMU – Marshall Meeder 52-yard field goal. Drive: 7 plays, 36 yards, 3:15. Central Michigan 6–0
- 0:57 CMU – Lew Nichols III 1-yard rush, Marshall Meeder kick good. Drive: 3 plays, 23 yards, 1:21. Central Michigan 13–0

Second quarter

- 1:48 CMU – Joel Wilson 15-yard pass from Daniel Richardson, Kalil Pimpleton conversion pass from Richardson. Drive: 3 plays, 9 yards, 0:46. Central Michigan 21–0

Third quarter

- 4:02 WSU – Travell Harris 5-yard run, Dean Janikowski kick good. Drive: 7 plays, 74 yards, 3:05. Central Michigan 21–7
- 2:24 WSU – De'Zhaun Stribling 5-yard pass from Victor Gabalis, Dean Janikowski kick good. Drive: 6 plays, 23 yards, 1:23. Central Michigan 21–14

Fourth quarter

- 9:11 CMU – Marshall Meeder 43-yard field goal. Drive: 4 plays, 7 yards, 1:26. Central Michigan 24–14
- 3:13 WSU – Lincoln Victor 16-yard pass from Victor Gabalis, Dean Janikowski kick good. Drive: 4 plays, 86 yards, 1:39. Central Michigan 24–21

Top passers

- WSU – Victor Gabalis – 11/23, 180 yards, 2 TD
- CMU – Daniel Richardson – 16/29, 193 yards, TD, INT

Top rushers

- WSU – Nakia Watson – 15 carries, 58 yards
- CMU – Lew Nichols III – 28 carries, 120 yards, TD

Top receivers

- WSU – Lincoln Victor – 4 receptions, 88 yards, TD
- CMU – JaCorey Sullivan – 6 receptions, 73 yards

== Awards ==
Player	Award	Date
Travell Harris	Pac-12 Special Teams Player of the Week	September 13, 2021
Brennan Jackson	Pac-12 Defensive Lineman of the Week	October 4, 2021
George Hicks III	Pac-12 Defensive Player of the Week	October 11, 2021
Liam Ryan	Pac-12 Offensive Lineman of the Week	October 11, 2021
Brennan Jackson	Pac-12 Defensive Lineman of the Week	October 18, 2021
Ron Stone Jr	Pac-12 Defensive Lineman of the Week	November 1, 2021
Jahad Woods	Pac-12 Defensive Player of the Week	November 22, 2021
Armani Marsh	Pac-12 Defensive Player of the Week	November 28, 2021
Dean Janikowski	Pac-12 Special Teams Player of the Week	November 28, 2021
Jayden de Laura	Pac-12 Freshman of the Week	November 28, 2021

== Staff ==
Name	Position	Seasons at Washington State	Alma mater
Nick Rolovich	Head coach (fired October 18)	2	Hawaii (2004)
Brian Smith	Associate head coach / offensive coordinator / running backs	2	Hawaii (2005)
Jake Dickert	Head coach (hired December 2) / defensive coordinator / Linebackers (until October 18)	2	Wisconsin–Stevens Point (2007)
John Richardson	Assistant head coach / Cornerbacks / recruiting coordinator (fired October 18)	2	North Dakota State (2010)
Craig Stutzmann	Co-offensive coordinator / quarterbacks (fired October 18)	2	Hawaii (2002)
Kyle Krantz	Special teams coordinator	1	Northern Colorado (2009)
Andre Allen	Wide receivers	2	Ashford (2014)
Mark Banker	Safeties	2	Springfield (MA) (1978)
A. J. Cooper	Defensive ends	2	North Dakota State (2006)
Ricky Logo	Defensive tackles (fired October 18)	2	North Carolina State (1992)
Mark Weber	Offensive line (fired October 18)	2	Cal Lutheran (1980)
Dwain Bradshaw	Head strength and conditioning coach	2	Arizona State (2014)
Jason Cvercko	Chief of Staff	2	Connecticut (2011)

== Rankings ==
Team	Poll	Pre	Wk 2	Wk 3	Wk 4	Wk 5	Wk 6	Wk 7	Wk 8	Wk 9	Wk 10	Wk 11	Wk 12	Wk 13	Wk 14	Final
Washington State	AP	NR	NR	NR	NR	NR	NR	NR	NR	NR	NR	NR	NR			
Washington State	C	NR	NR	NR	NR	NR	NR	NR	NR	NR	NR	NR	NR			
Washington State	CFP	Not released									NR	NR	NR			

Legend
	Improvement in ranking
	Drop in ranking
	Not ranked previous week
	No change in ranking from previous week
RV	Received votes but were not ranked in Top 25 of poll
