= 2021 Sun Bowl =

Postseason college football bowl game

2021 Tony the Tiger Sun Bowl
- 88th Sun Bowl
Washington State Cougars	Central Michigan Chippewas
(7–5)	(8–4)
Pac-12	MAC
21	24
Head coach: Jake Dickert	Head coach: Jim McElwain
	1	2	3	4	Total
Washington State	0	0	14	7	21
Central Michigan	13	8	0	3	24
- Date: December 31, 2021
- Season: 2021
- Stadium: Sun Bowl
- Location: El Paso, Texas
- MVP: Lew Nichols III (RB, Central Michigan)
- Referee: Larry Smith (Big Ten)
- Attendance: 34,540

United States TV coverage
- Network: CBS
- Announcers: Brad Nessler (play-by-play), Gary Danielson (Analyst), and Jamie Erdahl (Sideline)

The 2021 Sun Bowl was a college football bowl game played on December 31, 2021, with kickoff at 12:00 p.m. EST (10:00 a.m. local MST) and televised on CBS. It was the 88th edition of the Sun Bowl (87th playing, as the 2020 edition was cancelled due to the COVID-19 pandemic), and was one of the 2021–22 bowl games concluding the 2021 FBS football season. Sponsored by Kellogg's Frosted Flakes breakfast cereal, the game was officially known as the Tony the Tiger Sun Bowl, after its mascot, Tony the Tiger.

On December 26, the Miami Hurricanes announced that they would not be able to play in the game, due to COVID-19 issues; organizers stated that they would try to secure a replacement team to face the Washington State Cougars.

On December 27, the Central Michigan Chippewas were named as the Sun Bowl replacement team. The Chippewas had originally been scheduled to face the Boise State Broncos in the Arizona Bowl, until Boise State withdrew from that bowl due to COVID-19 issues.

== Teams ==
The bowl has tie-ins with the Atlantic Coast Conference (ACC) and the Pac-12 Conference. The originally planned matchup featured teams from those conferences. The withdrawal of the Miami Hurricanes, an ACC team, led to Central Michigan, a team from the Mid-American Conference (MAC), being selected to face Washington State of the Pac-12. This was the first time Central Michigan and Washington State played each other.

=== Washington State Cougars ===
Washington State finished their regular season with a 7–5 record, 6–3 in Pac-12 play. After losing three of their first four games, the Cougars won six of their final eight games. They faced one ranked opponent during the season, losing to Oregon in mid-November. Washington State had previously appeared in two Sun Bowls, winning the 2001 and 2015 editions.

=== Central Michigan Chippewas ===
Central Michigan finished their regular season with an 8–4 record, 6–2 in MAC play. After losing three of their first five games, they had only a single loss in their final seven games. They did not face any ranked opponents during the season. This was the first Sun Bowl appearance for Central Michigan.

== Game summary ==
The bowl's attendance was the lowest for a Sun Bowl since the 1982 edition.

2021 Tony the Tiger Sun Bowl

Quarter	1	2	3	4	Total
Washington State	0	0	14	7	21
Central Michigan	13	8	0	3	24

at Sun Bowl • El Paso, Texas

- Date: Friday, December 31, 2021
- Game time: 12:00 p.m. EST (10:00 a.m. local MST)
- Game weather: Rain • Temperature: 46 °F (8 °C)
- Game attendance: 34,540
- Referee: Larry Smith
- TV announcers (CBS): Brad Nessler (play-by-play), Gary Danielson (Analyst) and Jamie Erdahl (Sideline)
- Box score

Game information

First quarter

- 6:51 CMU – Marshall Meeder 49-yard field goal. Drive: 6 plays, 51 yards, 2:20. Central Michigan 3–0
- 2:18 CMU – Marshall Meeder 52-yard field goal. Drive: 7 plays, 36 yards, 3:15. Central Michigan 6–0
- 0:57 CMU – Lew Nichols III 1-yard rush, Marshall Meeder kick good. Drive: 3 plays, 23 yards, 1:21. Central Michigan 13–0

Second quarter

- 1:48 CMU – Joel Wilson 15-yard pass from Daniel Richardson, Kalil Pimpleton conversion pass from Richardson. Drive: 3 plays, 9 yards, 0:46. Central Michigan 21–0

Third quarter

- 4:02 WSU – Travell Harris 5-yard run, Dean Janikowski kick good. Drive: 7 plays, 74 yards, 3:05. Central Michigan 21–7
- 2:24 WSU – De'Zhaun Stribling 5-yard pass from Victor Gabalis, Dean Janikowski kick good. Drive: 6 plays, 23 yards, 1:23. Central Michigan 21–14

Fourth quarter

- 9:11 CMU – Marshall Meeder 43-yard field goal. Drive: 4 plays, 7 yards, 1:26. Central Michigan 24–14
- 3:13 WSU – Lincoln Victor 16-yard pass from Victor Gabalis, Dean Janikowski kick good. Drive: 4 plays, 86 yards, 1:39. Central Michigan 24–21

=== Statistics ===
Statistics	WSU	CMU
First downs	11	16
Plays–yards	66–240	72–355
Rushes–yards	26–13	39–147
Passing yards	227	208
Passing: comp–att–int	19–40–0	17–33–1
Turnovers		
Time of possession	25:02	34:58

Team	Category	Player	Statistics
Washington State	Passing	Victor Gabalis	12/23, 180 yards, 2 TD
Washington State	Rushing	Nakia Watson	17 carries, 62 yards
Washington State	Receiving	Lincoln Victor	5 receptions, 88 yards, TD
Central Michigan	Passing	Daniel Richardson	17/33, 208 yards, TD, INT
Central Michigan	Rushing	Lew Nichols III	29 carries, 137 yards, TD
Central Michigan	Receiving	JaCorey Sullivan	7 receptions, 83 yards
