= 2021 Central Michigan Chippewas football team =

American college football season

2021 Central Michigan Chippewas football

MAC West Division co-champion Sun Bowl champion

Sun Bowl, W 24–21 vs. Washington State
- Conference: Mid-American Conference
- West Division
- Record: 9–4 (6–2 MAC)
- Head coach: Jim McElwain (3rd season)
- Offensive coordinator: Kevin Barbay (1st season)
- Offensive scheme: Pro spread
- Defensive coordinator: Robb Akey (3rd season)
- Base defense: 4–3
- Home stadium: Kelly/Shorts Stadium

2021 Mid-American Conference football standings
	Conf.			Overall
Team	W		L	W		L
East Division
Kent State xy	6	–	2	7	–	7
Miami (OH)	5	–	3	7	–	6
Ohio	3	–	5	3	–	9
Bowling Green	2	–	6	4	–	8
Buffalo	2	–	6	4	–	8
Akron	1	–	7	2	–	10
West Division
Northern Illinois xy$	6	–	2	9	–	5
Central Michigan x	6	–	2	9	–	4
Toledo	5	–	3	7	–	6
Ball State	4	–	4	6	–	7
Eastern Michigan	4	–	4	7	–	6
Western Michigan	4	–	4	8	–	5
Championship: Northern Illinois 41, Kent State 23
$ – Conference champion; x – Division champion/co-champions; y – Championship game participant

The 2021 Central Michigan Chippewas football team represented Central Michigan University in the 2021 NCAA Division I FBS football season. They were led by third-year head coach Jim McElwain and played their home games at Kelly/Shorts Stadium as members of the West Division of the Mid-American Conference.

The Chippewas completed their regular season with an 8–4 record and accepted a bid to the Arizona Bowl, where they were due to face the Boise State Broncos. On December 27, Barstool Sports (the title sponsor of the bowl) founder Dave Portnoy announced the withdrawal of the Broncos from the bowl due to COVID-19 issues within the program; organizers stated that they would attempt to secure a replacement team to face the Chippewas. Later in the day, the Arizona Bowl was canceled, and Central Michigan was named as a replacement team for the Sun Bowl to face the Washington State Cougars.

== Schedule ==
Date	Time	Opponent	Site	TV	Result	Attendance
September 4	4:00 p.m.	at Missouri*	Faurot Field; Columbia, MO	SECN	L 24–34	46,327
September 11	3:00 p.m.	Robert Morris*	Kelly/Shorts Stadium; Mount Pleasant, MI	ESPN3	W 45–0	16,128
September 18	7:30 p.m.	at LSU*	Tiger Stadium; Baton Rouge, LA	SECN	L 21–49	92,547
September 25	12:00 p.m.	FIU*	Kelly/Shorts Stadium; Mount Pleasant, MI	ESPN+	W 31–27	18,382
October 2	3:30 p.m.	at Miami (OH)	Yager Stadium; Oxford, OH	ESPN+	L 17–28	15,065
October 9	3:30 p.m.	at Ohio	Peden Stadium; Athens, OH	ESPN+	W 30–27	20,928
October 16	3:30 p.m.	Toledo^{†}	Kelly/Shorts Stadium; Mount Pleasant, MI	CBSSN	W 26–23 ^{OT}	20,112
October 23	12:00 p.m.	Northern Illinois	Kelly/Shorts Stadium; Mount Pleasant, MI	ESPNU	L 38–39	15,232
November 3	7:00 p.m.	at Western Michigan	Waldo Stadium; Kalamazoo, MI (rivalry	ESPNU	W 42–30	13,137
November 10	8:00 p.m.	Kent State	Kelly/Shorts Stadium; Mount Pleasant, MI	ESPNU	W 54–30	9,213
November 17	7:00 p.m.	at Ball State	Scheumann Stadium; Muncie, IN	ESPNU	W 37–17	5,602
November 26	12:00 p.m.	Eastern Michigan	Kelly/Shorts Stadium; Mount Pleasant, MI (rivalry	ESPNU	W 31–10	7,708
December 31	12:00 p.m.	vs. Washington State	Sun Bowl; El Paso, TX (Sun Bowl)	CBS	W 24–21	34,540
*Non-conference game; ^{†}Homecoming; Rankings from AP Poll released prior to the game; All times are in Eastern time

== Game summaries ==
=== At Missouri ===
Central Michigan at Missouri

Team	1	2	3	4	Total
Central Michigan	7	7	0	10	24
• Missouri	7	10	7	10	34

- Date: September 4, 2021
- Location: Faurot Field
  Columbia, MO
- Game start: 4:00 p.m. EST
- Game attendance: 46,237
- Television network: SECN

Statistics	Central Michigan	Missouri
First downs	27	26
Total yards	475	468
Rushing yards	174	211
Passing yards	301	257
Turnovers	2	0
Time of possession	31:59	28:01

Team	Category	Player	Statistics
Central Michigan	Passing	Jacob Sirmon	23/45, 295 yards, 1 TD, 2 INTs
Central Michigan	Rushing	Lew Nichols III	19 carries, 135 yards, 1 TD
Central Michigan	Receiving	JaCorey Sullivan	8 receptions, 102 yards, 2 TDs
Missouri	Passing	Connor Bazelak	21/32, 257 yards, 2 TDs
Missouri	Rushing	Tyler Badie	25 carries, 203 yards, 1 TD
Missouri	Receiving	D'ionte Smith	2 receptions, 69 yards

=== Robert Morris ===
Robert Morris at Central Michigan

Team	1	2	3	4	Total
Robert Morris	0	0	0	0	0
• Central Michigan	7	21	14	3	45

- Date: September 11, 2021
- Location: Kelly/Shorts Stadium
  Mount Pleasant, MI
- Game start: 3:00 p.m. EST
- Game attendance: 16,128
- Television network: ESPN3

Statistics	Robert Morris	Central Michigan
First downs	3	28
Total yards	109	515
Rushing yards	96	287
Passing yards	13	228
Turnovers	1	0
Time of possession	23:21	36:45

Team	Category	Player	Statistics
Robert Morris	Passing	George Martin	5/8, 13 yards
Robert Morris	Rushing	Jaylon Brown	3 carries, 37 yards
Robert Morris	Receiving	Bryce Bevins	1 reception, 12 yards
Central Michigan	Passing	Jacob Sirmon	12/16, 110 yards, 3 TDs
Central Michigan	Rushing	De'Javion Stepney	9 carries, 81 yards
Central Michigan	Receiving	Dallas Dixon	5 receptions, 73 yards, 2 TDs

=== At LSU ===
Central Michigan at LSU

Team	1	2	3	4	Total
Central Michigan	7	0	7	7	21
• LSU	21	14	7	7	49

- Date: September 18, 2021
- Location: Tiger Stadium
  Baton Rouge, LA
- Game start: 7:30 p.m. EST
- Game attendance: 92,547
- Television network: SECN

Statistics	Central Michigan	LSU
First downs	17	23
Total yards	284	484
Rushing yards	56	84
Passing yards	228	400
Turnovers	2	1
Time of possession	33:02	26:58

Team	Category	Player	Statistics
Central Michigan	Passing	Jacob Sirmon	17/24, 156 yards, 1 TD, 1 INT
Central Michigan	Rushing	Myles Bailey	7 carries, 29 yards
Central Michigan	Receiving	JaCorey Sullivan	5 receptions, 114 yards, 1 TD
LSU	Passing	Max Johnson	26/35, 372 yards, 5 TDs, 1 INT
LSU	Rushing	Corey Kiner	12 carries, 74 yards, 1 TD
LSU	Receiving	Deion Smith	5 receptions, 135 yards, 2 TDs

=== FIU ===
FIU at Central Michigan

Team	1	2	3	4	Total
FIU	0	14	13	0	27
• Central Michigan	0	10	0	21	31

- Date: September 25, 2021
- Location: Kelly/Shorts Stadium
  Mount Pleasant, MI
- Game start: 12:00 p.m. EST
- Game attendance: 18,382
- Game weather: Sunny
- Referee: Jon Noli
- TV announcers (ESPN+): Jim Barber and Randy Buffington

Scoring summary
2	8:36	CMU	Marshall Meeder 35-yard field goal (11 plays, 73 yards, 4:35)	CMU 3–0
2	5:51	FIU	Tyrese Chambers 31-yard pass from Max Bortenschlager (Chase Gabriel kick) (6 plays, 77 yards, 2:33)	FIU 7–3
2	1:33	FIU	Kamareon Williams 3-yard pass from Max Bortenschlager (Chase Gabriel kick) (7 plays, 99 yards, 1:19)	FIU 14–3
2	0:34	CMU	Dallas Dixon 11-yard pass from Jacob Sirmon (Marshall Meeder kick) (2 plays, 7 yards, 0:10)	CMU 14–10
3	9:32	FIU	D'Vonte Price 5-yard run (kick blocked) (5 plays, 73 yards, 2:10)	FIU 20–10
3	3:17	FIU	Rishard Dames 6-yard punt return (Chase Gabriel kick)	FIU 27–10
4	10:57	CMU	Lew Nichols III 15-yard pass from Daniel Richardson (Marshall Meeder kick) (10 plays, 80 yards, 3:57)	FIU 27–17
4	7:12	CMU	JaCorey Sullivan 14-yard pass from Daniel Richardson (Marshall Meeder kick) (8 plays, 76 yards, 1:53)	FIU 27–24
4	1:18	CMU	Dallas Dixon 27-yard pass from Daniel Richardson (Marshall Meeder kick) (5 plays, 80 yards, 0:42)	CMU 31–27

Statistics	FIU	Central Michigan
First downs	18	29
Total yards	437	599
Rushing yards	42	202
Passing yards	395	397
Turnovers	2	2
Time of possession	26:40	33:20

Team	Category	Player	Statistics
FIU	Passing	Max Bortenschlager	20/38, 395 yards, 2 TDs, 1 INT
FIU	Rushing	D'Vonte Price	17 carries, 50 yards, 1 TD
FIU	Receiving	Tyrese Chambers	6 receptions, 175 yards, 1 TD
Central Michigan	Passing	Daniel Richardson	16/23, 276 yards, 3 TDs
Central Michigan	Rushing	Lew Nichols III	25 carries, 152 yards
Central Michigan	Receiving	Dallas Dixon	8 receptions, 127 yards, 2 TDs

=== At Miami (OH) ===
Central Michigan at Miami (OH)

Team	1	2	3	4	Total
Central Michigan	0	7	3	7	17
• Miami (OH)	14	0	0	14	28

- Date: October 2, 2021
- Location: Yager Stadium
  Oxford, OH
- Game start: 3:30 p.m. EST
- Game attendance: 15,065
- Television network: ESPN+

Statistics	Central Michigan	Miami
First downs	25	26
Total yards	430	514
Rushing yards	52	164
Passing yards	378	350
Turnovers	0	1
Time of possession	26:45	33:15

Team	Category	Player	Statistics
Central Michigan	Passing	Daniel Richardson	22/41, 326 yards, 2 TDs
Central Michigan	Rushing	Myles Bailey	8 carries, 29 yards
Central Michigan	Receiving	Dallas Dixon	7 receptions, 113 yards, 1 TD
Miami	Passing	AJ Mayer	13/18, 179 yards, 2 TDs, 1 INT
Miami	Rushing	Keyon Mozee	13 carries, 83 yards
Miami	Receiving	Mac Hippenhammer	8 receptions, 170 yards

=== At Ohio ===
Central Michigan at Ohio

Team	1	2	3	4	Total
• Central Michigan	7	6	7	10	30
Ohio	3	7	9	8	27

- Date: October 9, 2021
- Location: Peden Stadium
  Athens, OH
- Game start: 3:30 p.m. EST
- Game attendance: 20,928
- Television network: ESPN+

Statistics	Central Michigan	Ohio
First downs	23	22
Total yards	461	369
Rushing yards	204	179
Passing yards	257	190
Turnovers	2	1
Time of possession	26:33	33:27

Team	Category	Player	Statistics
Central Michigan	Passing	Daniel Richardson	16/30, 257 yards, 1 TD, 2 INTs
Central Michigan	Rushing	Lew Nichols III	30 carries, 186 yards, 1 TD
Central Michigan	Receiving	Dallas Dixon	4 receptions, 91 yards
Ohio	Passing	Armani Rogers	13/18, 190 yards
Ohio	Rushing	De'Montre Tuggle	19 carries, 83 yards, 1 TD
Ohio	Receiving	Cameron Odom	4 receptions, 88 yards

=== Toledo ===
Toledo at Central Michigan

Team	1	2	3	4	OT	Total
Toledo	0	3	7	13	0	23
• Central Michigan	7	10	3	3	3	26

- Date: October 16, 2021
- Location: Kelly/Shorts Stadium
  Mount Pleasant, MI
- Game start: 3:30 p.m. EST
- Game attendance: 20,112
- Television network: CBSSN

Statistics	Toledo	Central Michigan
First downs	20	13
Total yards	350	332
Rushing yards	142	128
Passing yards	208	204
Turnovers	0	0
Time of possession	31:33	28:27

Team	Category	Player	Statistics
Toledo	Passing	Dequan Finn	15/32, 208 yards
Toledo	Rushing	Bryant Koback	15 carries, 87 yards
Toledo	Receiving	Isaiah Winstead	4 receptions, 108 yards
Central Michigan	Passing	Daniel Richardson	21/35, 204 yards, 2 TDs
Central Michigan	Rushing	Lew Nichols III	29 carries, 136 yards
Central Michigan	Receiving	Kalil Pimpleton	6 receptions, 103 yards

=== Northern Illinois ===
Northern Illinois at Central Michigan

Team	1	2	3	4	Total
• Northern Illinois	7	11	11	10	39
Central Michigan	14	14	7	3	38

- Date: October 23, 2021
- Location: Kelly/Shorts Stadium
  Mount Pleasant, MI
- Game start: 12:00 p.m. EST
- Game attendance: 15,232
- Television network: ESPNU

Statistics	Northern Illinois	Central Michigan
First downs	25	25
Total yards	548	500
Rushing yards	197	189
Passing yards	351	311
Turnovers	0	1
Time of possession	36:09	23:51

Team	Category	Player	Statistics
Northern Illinois	Passing	Rocky Lombardi	17/27, 348 yards, 3 TDs
Northern Illinois	Rushing	Jay Ducker	31 carries, 183 yards
Northern Illinois	Receiving	Trayvon Rudolph	6 receptions, 160 yards, 2 TDs
Central Michigan	Passing	Daniel Richardson	23/36, 289 yards, 3 TDs
Central Michigan	Rushing	Lew Nichols III	22 carries, 192 yards, 2 TDs
Central Michigan	Receiving	Kalil Pimpleton	6 receptions, 130 yards, 1 TD

=== At Western Michigan (Michigan MAC Trophy) ===
Michigan MAC Trophy

Team	1	2	3	4	Total
• Central Michigan	0	21	7	14	42
Western Michigan	7	7	10	6	30

- Date: November 3, 2021
- Location: Waldo Stadium
  Kalamazoo, MI
- Game start: 7:00 p.m. EST
- Game attendance: 13,137
- Television network: ESPN+

Statistics	Central Michigan	Western Michigan
First downs	17	25
Total yards	389	445
Rushing yards	148	169
Passing yards	241	276
Turnovers	0	3
Time of possession	25:14	34:46

Team	Category	Player	Statistics
Central Michigan	Passing	Daniel Richardson	10/18, 230 yards, 1 TD
Central Michigan	Rushing	Lew Nichols III	26 carries, 163 yards, 2 TDs
Central Michigan	Receiving	Kalil Pimpleton	5 receptions, 115 yards, 1 TD
Western Michigan	Passing	Kaleb Eleby	22/36, 276 yards, 1 TD, 1 INT
Western Michigan	Rushing	Sean Tyler	15 carries, 59 yards, 2 TDs
Western Michigan	Receiving	Corey Crooms	7 receptions, 118 yards, 1 TD

=== Kent State ===
Kent State at Central Michigan

Team	1	2	3	4	Total
Kent State	14	3	13	0	30
• Central Michigan	0	26	14	14	54

- Date: November 10, 2021
- Location: Kelly/Shorts Stadium
  Mount Pleasant, MI
- Game start: 8:00 p.m. EST
- Game attendance: 9,213
- Television network: ESPNU

Statistics	Kent State	Central Michigan
First downs	23	33
Total yards	456	505
Rushing yards	134	221
Passing yards	322	284
Turnovers	3	0
Time of possession	23:03	36:57

Team	Category	Player	Statistics
Kent State	Passing	Dustin Crum	28/38, 322, 2 TDs
Kent State	Rushing	Marquez Cooper	21 carries, 83 yards, 2 TDs
Kent State	Receiving	Dante Cephas	5 receptions, 100 yards, 1 TD
Central Michigan	Passing	Daniel Richardson	21/27, 268 yards, 4 TDs
Central Michigan	Rushing	Lew Nichols III	43 carries, 215 yards, 4 TDs
Central Michigan	Receiving	JaCorey Sullivan	5 receptions, 61 yards

=== At Ball State ===
Central Michigan at Ball State

Team	1	2	3	4	Total
• Central Michigan	7	21	6	3	37
Ball State	7	10	0	0	17

- Date: November 17, 2021
- Location: Scheumann Stadium
  Muncie, IN
- Game start: 7:00 p.m. EST
- Game attendance: 5,602
- Television network: ESPNU

Statistics	Central Michigan	Ball State
First downs	26	18
Total yards	567	329
Rushing yards	285	159
Passing yards	282	170
Turnovers	2	1
Time of possession	32:47	27:13

Team	Category	Player	Statistics
Central Michigan	Passing	Daniel Richardson	20/25, 283 yards, 2 TDs, 2 INTs
Central Michigan	Rushing	Lew Nichols III	32 carries, 219 yards, 3 TDs
Central Michigan	Receiving	Kalil Pimpleton	7 receptions, 144 yards, 1 TD
Ball State	Passing	Drew Plitt	21/39, 170 yards, 1 TD, 1 INT
Ball State	Rushing	Carson Steele	20 carries, 93 yards, 1 TD
Ball State	Receiving	Jayshon Jackson	6 receptions, 61 yards

=== Eastern Michigan (Michigan MAC Trophy) ===
Michigan MAC Trophy

Team	1	2	3	4	Total
Eastern Michigan	0	3	7	0	10
• Central Michigan	7	3	7	14	31

- Date: November 26, 2021
- Location: Kelly/Shorts Stadium
  Mount Pleasant, MI
- Game start: 12:00 p.m. EST
- Game attendance: 7,708
- Television network: ESPNU

Statistics	Eastern Michigan	Central Michigan
First downs	15	22
Total yards	226	366
Rushing yards	5	236
Passing yards	221	130
Turnovers	1	1
Time of possession	27:17	32:43

Team	Category	Player	Statistics
Eastern Michigan	Passing	Ben Bryant	24/35, 221 yards
Eastern Michigan	Rushing	Bryson Moss	5 carries, 26 yards
Eastern Michigan	Receiving	Tanner Knue	7 receptions, 70 yards
Central Michigan	Passing	Daniel Richardson	12/24, 130 yards, 2 TDs, 1 INT
Central Michigan	Rushing	Lew Nichols III	44 carries, 194 yards, 1 TD
Central Michigan	Receiving	JaCorey Sullivan	4 receptions, 46 yards, 2 TDs

=== Vs. Washington State (Sun Bowl) ===
Sun Bowl

Team	1	2	3	4	Total
Washington State	0	0	14	7	21
• Central Michigan	13	8	0	3	24

- Date: December 31, 2021
- Location: Sun Bowl
  El Paso, TX
- Game start: 12:00 p.m. EST
- Game attendance: 34,540
- Game weather: Rain • Temperature: 46 °F (8 °C)
- Referee: Larry Smith
- TV announcers (CBS): Brad Nessler (play-by-play), Gary Danielson (Analyst), and Jamie Erdahl (Sideline)

Scoring summary
1	6:51	CMU	Marshall Meeder 49-yard field goal (6 plays, 51 yards, 2:20)	CMU 3–0
1	2:18	CMU	Marshall Meeder 49-yard field goal (7 plays, 36 yards, 3:15)	CMU 6–0
1	0:57	CMU	Lew Nichols III 1-yard rush (Marshall Meeder kick) (3 plays, 23 yards, 1:21)	CMU 13–0
2	1:48	CMU	Joel Wilson 15-yard pass from Daniel Richardson, Kalil Pimpleton conversion pass from Daniel Richardson (3 plays, 9 yards, 0:46)	CMU 21–0
3	4:02	WSU	Travell Harris 5-yard run (Dean Janikowski kick) (7 plays, 74 yards, 3:05)	CMU 21–7
3	2:24	WSU	De'Zhaun Stribling 5-yard pass from Victor Gabalis (Dean Janikowski kick) (6 plays, 23 yards, 1:23)	CMU 21–14
4	9:11	CMU	Marshall Meeder 43-yard field goal (4 plays, 7 yards, 1:26)	CMU 24–14
4	3:13	WSU	Lincoln Victor 16-yard pass from Victor Gabalis (Dean Janikowski kick) (4 plays, 86 yards, 1:39)	CMU 24–21

Statistics	Washington State	Central Michigan
First downs	11	15
Total yards	243	338
Rushing yards	18	145
Passing yards	225	193
Turnovers	1	2
Time of possession	24:43	35:17

Team	Category	Player	Statistics
Washington State	Passing	Victor Gabalis	11/23, 180 yards, 2 TDs
Washington State	Rushing	Nakia Watson	15 carries, 58 yards
Washington State	Receiving	Lincoln Victor	4 receptions, 88 yards, 1 TD
Central Michigan	Passing	Daniel Richardson	16/29, 193 yards, 1 TD, 1 INT
Central Michigan	Rushing	Lew Nichols III	28 carries, 120 yards, 1 TD
Central Michigan	Receiving	JaCorey Sullivan	6 receptions, 73 yards
