= 2021 Boise State Broncos football team =

American college football season

2021 Boise State Broncos football

Arizona Bowl vs. Central Michigan, Canceled
- Conference: Mountain West Conference
- Mountain Division
- Record: 7–5 (5–3 MW)
- Head coach: Andy Avalos (1st season)
- Offensive coordinator: Tim Plough (1st season)
- Offensive scheme: Up-tempo spread
- Defensive coordinator: Spencer Danielson (1st season)
- Co-defensive coordinator: Kane Ioane (1st season)
- Base defense: 4–2–5
- Home stadium: Albertsons Stadium

Uniform
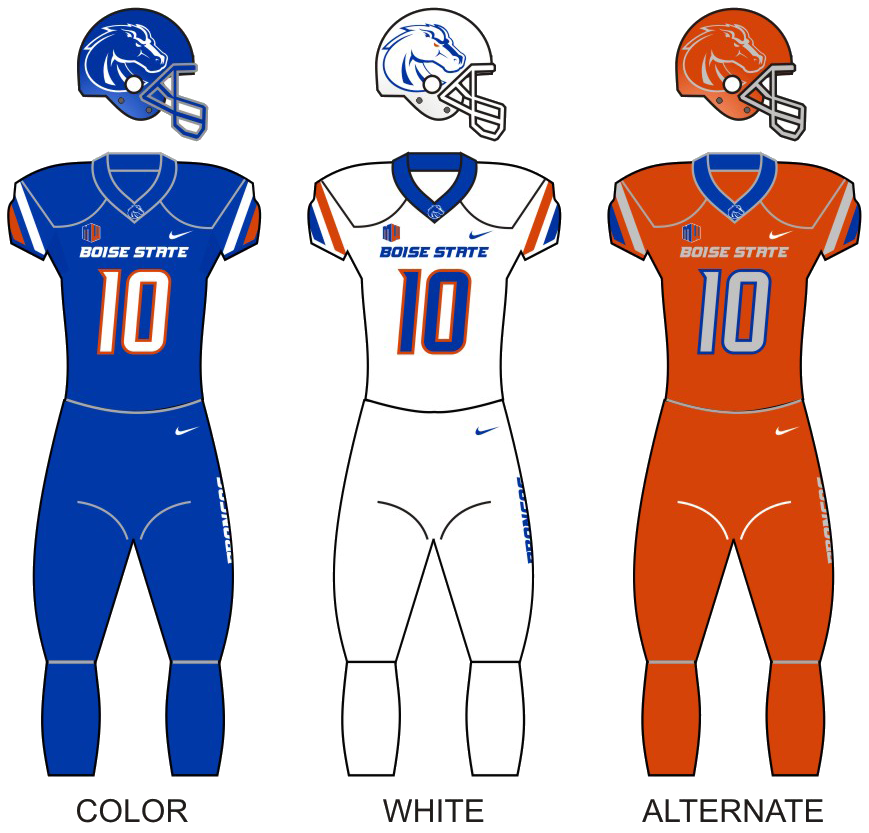

2021 Mountain West Conference football standings
	Conf.			Overall
Team	W		L	W		L
Mountain Division
No. 24 Utah State xy$	6	–	2	11	–	3
Air Force x	6	–	2	10	–	3
Boise State	5	–	3	7	–	5
Wyoming	2	–	6	7	–	6
Colorado State	2	–	6	3	–	9
New Mexico	1	–	7	3	–	9
West Division
No. 25 San Diego State xy	7	–	1	12	–	2
Fresno State	6	–	2	10	–	3
Nevada	5	–	3	8	–	5
Hawaii	3	–	5	6	–	7
San Jose State	3	–	5	5	–	7
UNLV	2	–	6	2	–	10
Championship: Utah State 46, San Diego State 13
$ – Conference champion; x – Division champion/co-champions; y – Championship game participant; Rankings from AP Poll

The 2021 Boise State Broncos football team represented Boise State University in the 2021 NCAA Division I FBS football season. The Broncos were led by first–year head coach Andy Avalos and played their home games at Albertsons Stadium in Boise, Idaho. They completed as members of the Mountain Division of the Mountain West Conference.

The Broncos completed their regular season with a 7–5 record and accepted a bid to the Arizona Bowl, where they were due to face the Central Michigan Chippewas. On December 27, Barstool Sports (the title sponsor of the bowl) founder Dave Portnoy announced the withdrawal of the Broncos from the bowl due to COVID-19 issues within the program; organizers stated that they would attempt to secure a replacement team to face the Chippewas. Later in the day, the Arizona Bowl was canceled, and Central Michigan was named as a replacement team for the Sun Bowl.

== Schedule ==
Date	Time	Opponent	Site	TV	Result	Attendance
September 2	7:46 p.m.	at UCF*	Bounce House; Orlando, FL	ESPN	L 31–36	43,928
September 10	7:30 p.m.	UTEP*	Albertsons Stadium; Boise, ID	FS1	W 54–13	35,518
September 18	7:00 p.m.	Oklahoma State*	Albertsons Stadium; Boise, ID	FS1	L 20–21	36,702
September 25	10:00 a.m.	at Utah State	Maverik Stadium; Logan, UT	CBS	W 27–3	23,715
October 2	1:30 p.m.	Nevada^{†}	Albertsons Stadium; Boise, ID (rivalry)	FS1	L 31–41	37,426
October 9	1:30 p.m.	at No. 10 BYU*	LaVell Edwards Stadium; Provo, UT	ABC	W 26–17	63,470
October 16	7:00 p.m.	Air Force	Albertsons Stadium; Boise, ID	FS1	L 17–24	34,446
October 30	5:00 p.m.	at Colorado State	Canvas Stadium; Fort Collins, CO	CBSSN	W 28–19	25,221
November 6	5:00 p.m.	at No. 23 Fresno State	Bulldog Stadium; Fresno, CA (Battle for the Milk Can)	CBSSN	W 40–14	41,031
November 12	7:00 p.m.	Wyoming	Albertsons Stadium; Boise, ID	FS1	W 23–13	35,474
November 20	7:00 p.m.	New Mexico	Albertsons Stadium; Boise, ID	FS1	W 37–0	28,542
November 26	10:00 a.m.	at No. 21 San Diego State	Dignity Health Sports Park; Carson, CA	CBS	L 16–27	11,886
~~December 31~~	~~12:00 p.m.~~	vs. ~~Central Michigan~~*	~~Arizona Stadium~~; ~~Tucson, AZ~~ (~~Arizona Bowl~~)	~~Barstool Sports~~	Withdrew	–
*Non-conference game; ^{†}Homecoming; Rankings from AP Poll (and CFP Rankings, after November 2) - Released prior to game; All times are in Mountain time

== Roster ==
2021 Boise State Broncos football team roster
Players
Coaches
Offense

Pos.	#	Name	Class
WR	1	Octavius Evans	Sr
WR	2	Khalil Shakir	Sr
TE	3	Riley Smith	Jr
RB	4	Cyrus Habibi-Likio	Sr
WR	5	Stefan Cobbs	Jr
WR	6	C. T. Thomas	GS
WR	7	Latrell Caples	Fr
QB	8	Colt Fulton	Fr
QB	9	Colton FitzGerald	Fr
QB	10	Taylen Green	Fr
WR	13	Jalen Richmond	Fr
QB	14	Andy Peters	Fr
WR	15	Maclaine Griffin	Jr
QB	16	Jack Sears	Sr
WR	17	Davis Koetter	Sr
WR	18	Billy Bowens	Jr
QB	19	Hank Bachmeier	Jr
RB	21	Andrew Van Buren	Sr
RB	24	George Holani	So
RB	25	Taequan Tyler	So
WR	27	Shea Whiting	So
WR	29	Ben Ford	Fr
RB	33	Tyler Crowe	So
RB	37	Danny Smith	Jr
TE	40	Russell Corrigan	Fr
OL	50	Riden Leong	Jr
OL	51	Dalton Lins	Jr
OL	55	Kekaniokoa Holomalia-Gonzalez	Jr
OL	57	Nathan Cardona	Fr
OL	63	Mason Randolph	Fr
OL	66	Ben Dooley	So
OL	68	Jake Stetz	GS
OL	69	Garrett Curran	Jr
OL	70	John Ojukwu	Sr
OL	71	Donte Harrington	GS
OL	72	Dallas Holliday	Jr
OL	73	Joseph Amos	Fr
OL	74	Jacob Golden	So
OL	75	Will Farrar	Sr
OL	77	Uzo Osuji	GS
OL	78	Julian Simpson	So
OL	79	Cord Kringlen	Fr
WR	80	Eric McAlister	Fr
WR	81	Austin Bolt	Fr
WR	82	Kaden Dudley	Fr
WR	83	Cole Wright	Fr
TE	85	Matt Lauter	Fr
TE	86	Tyler Eiguren	So
TE	87	Kurt Rafdal	Sr
TE	88	Tyneil Hopper	Jr
WR	89	Connor Riddle	Jr
TE	96	Luke Voorhees	Fr

Defense

Pos.	#	Name	Class
S	0	JL Skinner	Jr
OLB	3	Brandon Hawkins	Jr
S	4	Rodney Robinson	Fr
MLB	7	Ezekiel Noa	Sr
CB	8	Markel Reed	Jr
OLB	10	Andrew Simpson	Fr
CB	14	Kaonohi Kaniho	Fr
CB	16	Jared Reed	Sr
DE	19	Aisa Kelemete	Sr
CB	20	Roman Kafentzis	Sr
CB	21	Tyreque Jones	Sr
CB	22	Tyric LeBeauf	Jr
S	23	Seyi Oladipo	Fr
CB	24	Damon Cole	Sr
CB	25	Isaiah Bradford	Fr
CB	26	Caleb Biggers	Sr
CB	28	Kekaula Kaniho	GS
DE	30	Isaiah Bagnah	So
S	31	Zion Washington	Fr
OLB	32	Tyler Visser	Sr
S	34	Alexander Teubner	So
S	36	Semaj Verner	Fr
DE	38	Demitri Washington	Jr
CB	39	Jalen Neal	Fr
CB	41	Jaylen Clark	Fr
OLB	44	Riley Whimpey	GS
DE	45	James Wilborn Jr.	Fr
MLB	47	Jai Jones	Fr
S	48	Jordan Erickson	Fr
DE	49	Dylan Herberg	Jr
OLB	52	D. J. Schramm	Jr
OLB	53	Marco Notarainni	Fr
DE	54	Gabe Hunter	Fr
DE	55	Shane Irwin	Sr
DE	56	Casey Kline	So
MLB	58	Ty Tanner	Fr
MLB	59	Rejhan Tatum	Fr
DT	67	Bryson Kievit	Fr
DT	90	Scale Igiehon	Sr
DT	91	Ahmed Hassanein	Fr
DT	92	Michael Callahan	So
DE	93	Andy Nwaoko	Fr
DT	94	Jackson Cravens	Jr
DT	95	Divine Obichere	Sr
DT	97	Keeghan Freeborn	Jr
DT	98	Herbert Gums	Fr
DT	99	Scott Matlock	Jr

Special teams

Pos.	#	Name	Class
K/P	35	Jonah Dalmas	So
LS	42	Daniel Cantrell	Sr
P	43	Gavin Wale	So
K/P	45	Will Ferrin	Fr
K/P	46	Joel Velazquez	GS
LS	65	Mason Hutton	Fr

Head coach

- Andy Avalos

Coordinators/assistant coaches

- Frank Maile – Associate head coach/Defensive linemen
- Tim Plough – Offensive coordinator/Quarterbacks
- Kane Ioane – Co-defensive coordinator/Safeties
- Spencer Danielson – Co-defensive coordinator/Inside linebackers
- Stacy Collins – Special teams coordinator/Edge rushers
- Matt Miller – Wide receivers
- Kent Riddle – Tight ends
- Jeron Johnson – Cornerbacks
- Tim Keane – Offensive linemen
- Winston Venable – Running backs
- Reid Kagy – Director, Strength and Conditioning
- Brandon Crosby – Offensive analyst
- Kharyee Marshall – Defensive analyst
- Jabril Frazier – Graduate assistant
- Tyson Prince – Graduate assistant
- McCauley Todd – Graduate assistant
- Keanu Yamamoto – Graduate assistant

Legend

- (C) Team captain
- (S) Suspended
- (I) Ineligible
- Injured
- Redshirt

Roster
Last update: 8/12/23

== Rankings ==
Ranking movements Legend: ██ Increase in ranking ██ Decrease in ranking — = Not ranked RV = Received votes
	Week															
Poll	Pre	1	2	3	4	5	6	7	8	9	10	11	12	13	14	Final
AP	RV	—	—	—	—	—	—	—	—	—	—	—	—	—	—	—
Coaches	RV	—	RV	—	—	—	—	—	—	—	—	—	—	—	—	—
CFP	Not released									—	—	—	—	—	—	Not released

== Game summaries ==
=== At UCF ===
Boise State Broncos at UCF Knights

Quarter	1	2	3	4	Total
Broncos	14	10	0	7	31
Knights	0	14	14	8	36

at Bounce House, Orlando, FL

- Date: September 2, 2021
- Game time: 5:00 p.m. MDT (Kicked at 7:46 p.m. – delayed 2 hours and 46 minutes to kickoff due to lightning)
- Game weather: Temperature: 73°F • Wind: W 5 MPH • Weather: Cloudy
- Game attendance: 43,928
- Referee: David Alvarez
- TV announcers (ESPN): Matt Barrie (play-by-play), Roddy Jones (analyst) and Harry Lyles Jr. (sideline)
- Pregame Notes, Recap, Postgame Notes, Gamebook

Game information

First quarter

- 09:58 - BSU - Tyric LeBeauf 100 yd interception (Jonah Dalmas kick) • Broncos 7–0
- 04:00 - BSU - Andrew Van Buren 3 yd run (Jonah Dalmas kick), 10 plays, 78 yards, TOP 03:46 • Broncos 14–0

Second quarter

- 12:50 - BSU - Khalil Shakir 19 yd pass from Hank Bachmeier (Jonah Dalmas kick), 12 plays, 73 yards, TOP 04:17 • Broncos 21–0
- 11:23 - UCF - Alec Holler 23 yd pass from Dillon Gabriel (Daniel Obarski kick), 4 plays, 75 yards, TOP 01:27 • Broncos 21–7
- 05:06 - BSU - Jonah Dalmas 31 yd field goal, 9 plays, 32 yards, TOP 03:35 • Broncos 24-7
- 00:06 - UCF - Titus Mokiao-Atimalala 8 yd pass from Dillon Gabriel (Daniel Obarski kick), 7 plays, 74 yards, TOP 01:21 • Broncos 24–14

Third quarter

- 11:37 - UCF - Brandon Johnson 11 yd pass from Dillon Gabriel (Daniel Obarski kick), 8 plays, 84 yards, TOP 03:17 • Broncos 24–21
- 00:56 - UCF - Jaylon Robinson 21 yd pass from Dillon Gabriel (Daniel Obarski kick), 10 plays, 78 yards, TOP 04:24 • Knights 28–24

Fourth quarter

- 14:55 - UCF - 0 yd safety • Knights 30–24
- 08:02 - BSU - Khalil Shakir 7 yd pass from Hank Bachmeier (Jonah Dalmas kick), 2 plays, 31 yards, TOP 00:38 • Broncos 31–30
- 04:16 - UCF - Isaiah Bowser 8 yd run (Dillon Gabriel run failed), 10 plays, 75 yards, TOP 03:46 • Knights 36–31

BSU Passing Leaders

- Hank Bachmeier – 25/39, 263 yards, 2 TD, 1 INT

BSU Rushing Leaders

- Andrew Van Buren – 10 rushes, 26 yards

BSU Receiving Leaders

- Khalil Shakir – 5 receptions, 91 yards, 2 TD

BSU Defense Leaders

- JL Skinner – 13 tackles

UCF hosted Boise State in the 2021 season opener. It was the first meeting between the two Group of Five front-runners, and the first game for new head coach Gus Malzahn. The kickoff was delayed about 2 hours and 46 minutes due to lightning in the area, but the inclement weather passed and the game played to completion without additional delay. Boise State jumped out to a 21–0 lead, but UCF rallied and held on for a 36–31 victory. UCF won their sixth consecutive season opener, and 14th season opener out of the last 16 years.

On their first drive of the first quarter, quarterback Dillon Gabriel swiftly drove the Knights to the Boise State 8 yard line. However, his pass was intercepted by Tyric LeBeauf at the goal line, who ran it back 100 yards for a Broncos touchdown. Trailing 21–0, the Knights finally got on the board with a 23-yard catch and run touchdown by Alec Holler early in the second quarter. In the final minute of the second quarter, Gabriel drove the Knights down the field and with 6 seconds left in the half, scrambled to find Titus Mokiao-Atimalala just inside the pylon for a touchdown and a 24–14 score at halftime.

UCF received the opening kickoff for the second half, and the Knights scored again. This time a touchdown pass from Gabriel to Brandon Johnson, who caught the ball on the right side of the endzone, his foot just inches from being out-of-bounds. With 56 seconds left in the third quarter, the Knights took the lead for the first time. Gabriel connected with Jaylon Robinson for a 23-yard over-the-shoulder touchdown pass, and a 28–24 lead.

The Knights defense stiffened in the second half, forcing the Broncos into three three-and-outs along with a safety. With UCF leading 30–24, momentum shifted back to the Broncos after Tyric LeBeauf intercepted Gabriel for the second time. The turnover led to a Boise State touchdown, and the Knights trailed by 1 point with 8 minutes left in regulation.

Gabriel drove the Knights 75 yards in ten plays (including a Targeting penalty by the Broncos), capped off with a 9-yard go-ahead touchdown run by Isaiah Bowser. With four minutes to go, the Broncos had one last chance. They drove to the UCF 35, but quarterback Hank Bachmeier was scrambling and threw up an easy interception for Dyllon Lester. The Knights were able to roll the clock down, and held on for a 36–31 victory. It matched the best comeback win in school history (21 points in 1984 & 2013). Gabriel finished the game with 318 passing yards, 64 yards rushing, and four touchdown passes, and Bowser has 32 carries for 170 yards (1 touchdown) in his Knights debut. The Knights extended their streak of scoring both a rushing touchdown and a passing touchdown to 50 consecutive games, the longest such active streak in the nation.

=== UTEP ===
UTEP Miners at Boise State Broncos

Quarter	1	2	3	4	Total
Miners	3	10	0	0	13
Broncos	10	31	10	3	54

at Albertsons Stadium, Boise, ID

- Date: September 10, 2021
- Game time: 7:30 p.m. MDT (Kicked at 7:40 p.m.)
- Game weather: Temperature: 68°F • Wind: E 4 MPH • Weather: Cloudy
- Game attendance: 35,518
- Referee: Rodney Burnette
- TV announcers (FS1): Alex Faust (play-by-play) and Petros Papadakis (analyst)
- Pregame Notes, Recap, Postgame Notes, Gamebook

Game information

First quarter

- 10:36 - TEP - Gavin Baechle 33 yd field goal, 9 plays, 59 yards, TOP 04:24 • Miners 3–0
- 09:08 - BSU - Jonah Dalmas 39 yd field goal, 6 plays, 58 yards, TOP 01:21 • Tied 3–3
- 06:42 - BSU - Stefan Cobbs 81 yd punt return (Jonah Dalmas kick) • Broncos 10–3

Second quarter

- 13:26 - TEP - Gavin Baechle 21 yd field goal, 15 plays, 72 yards, TOP 08:16 • Broncos 10–6
- 11:33 - BSU - George Holani 10 yd rush (Jonah Dalmas kick), 6 plays, 75 yards, TOP 01:53 • Broncos 17–6
- 11:15 - BSU - Andrew Van Buren 3 yd rush (Jonah Dalmas kick), 1 plays, 3 yards, TOP 00:04 • Broncos 24–6
- 08:43 - BSU - Stefan Cobbs 61 yd pass from Hank Bachmeier (Jonah Dalmas kick), 1 plays, 61 yards, TOP 00:10 • Broncos 31–6
- 06:21 - TEP - Jacob Cowing 48 yd pass from Gavin Hardison (Gavin Baechle kick), 5 plays, 75 yards, TOP 02:22 • Broncos 31–13
- 03:00 - BSU - Jonah Dalmas 27 yd field goal, 9 plays, 69 yards, TOP 03:15 • Broncos 34-13
- 00:14 - BSU - Andrew Van Buren 1 yd rush (Jonah Dalmas kick), 5 plays, 48 yards, TOP 00:33 • Broncos 41–13

Third quarter

- 13:50 - BSU - Tyneil Hopper 23 yd pass from Hank Bachmeier (Jonah Dalmas kick), 3 plays, 38 yards, TOP 01:02 • Broncos 48–13
- 04:19 - BSU - Jonah Dalmas 29 yd field goal, 4 plays, 7 yards, TOP 01:52 • Broncos 51–13

Fourth quarter

- 04:20 - BSU - Jonah Dalmas 34 yd field goal, 8 plays, 33 yards, TOP 03:23 • Broncos 54–13

BSU Passing Leaders

- Hank Bachmeier – 17/24, 340 yards, 2 TD

BSU Rushing Leaders

- Tyler Crowe – 7 rushes, 45 yards

BSU Receiving Leaders

- Khalil Shakir – 7 receptions, 166 yards

BSU Defense Leaders

- JL Skinner – 9 tackles, 2 FF

=== Oklahoma State ===
Oklahoma State Cowboys at Boise State Broncos

Quarter	1	2	3	4	Total
Cowboys	7	14	0	0	21
Broncos	10	10	0	0	20

at Albertsons Stadium, Boise, ID

- Date: September 18, 2021
- Game time: 7:00 p.m. MDT (Kicked at 7:10 p.m.)
- Game weather: Temperature: 64°F • Wind: NW 21 MPH • Weather: Cloudy
- Game attendance: 36,702
- Referee: Tuta Salaam
- TV announcers (FS1): Aaron Goldsmith (play-by-play) and Mark Helfrich (analyst)
- Pregame Notes, Recap, Postgame Notes, Gamebook

Game information

First quarter

- 10:41 - BSU - Jonah Dalmas 40 yd field goal, 12 plays, 52 yards, TOP 04:19 • Broncos 3–0
- 05:10 - BSU - Davis Koetter 28 yd pass from Hank Bachmeier (Jonah Dalmas kick), 10 plays, 70 yards, TOP 03:33 • Broncos 10–0
- 04:59 - OSU - Jaylen Warren 75 yd rush (Alex Hale kick), 1 plays, 75 yards, TOP 00:11 • Broncos 10–7

Second quarter

- 10:07 - BSU - Cyrus Habibi-Likio 5 yd rush (Jonah Dalmas kick), 9 plays, 43 yards, TOP 03:22 • Broncos 20–7
- 06:26 - BSU - Jonah Dalmas 36 yd field goal, 8 plays, 35 yards, TOP 02:32 • Broncos 20–7
- 02:10 - OSU - Jaylen Warren 6 yd rush (Hale, Alex kick), 10 plays, 75 yards, TOP 04:16 • Broncos 20–14
- 00:06 - OSU - Spencer Sanders 1 yd rush (Hale, Alex kick), 5 plays, 21 yards, TOP 01:52 • Cowboys 21–20

Third quarter

- No scoring plays.

Fourth quarter

- No scoring plays.

BSU Passing Leaders

- Hank Bachmeier – 22/34, 242 yards, 1 TD, 1 INT

BSU Rushing Leaders

- Cyrus Habibi-Likio – 8 rushes, 27 yards, 1 TD

BSU Receiving Leaders

- Khalil Shakir – 8 receptions, 78 yards

BSU Defense Leaders

- JL Skinner – 10 tackles

=== At Utah State ===
Boise State Broncos at Utah State Aggies

Quarter	1	2	3	4	Total
Broncos	10	0	7	10	27
Cougars	0	0	0	3	3

at Maverik Stadium, Logan, UT

- Date: September 25, 2021
- Game time: 10:00 a.m. MDT (Kicked at 10:07 a.m.)
- Game weather: Temperature: 70°F • Weather: Sunny
- Game attendance: 23,715
- Referee: Steve Baron
- TV announcers (CBS): Rich Waltz (play-by-play) and Aaron Taylor (analyst)
- Pregame Notes, Recap, Postgame Notes, Gamebook

Game information

First quarter

- 10:17 - BSU - Jonah Dalmas 28 yd field goal, 9 plays, 47 yards, TOP 03:48 • Broncos 3–0
- 00:56 - BSU - Andrew Van Buren 2 yd run (Jonah Dalmas kick), 3 plays, 76 yards, TOP 00:56 • Broncos 10–0

Second quarter

- No scoring plays.

Third quarter

- 09:32 - BSU - Khalil Shakir 3 yd pass from Hank Bachmeier (Jonah Dalmas kick), 4 plays, 18 yards, TOP 01:21 • Broncos 17–0

Fourth quarter

- 14:03 - USU - Connor Coles 20 yd field goal, 8 plays, 85 yards, TOP 02:54 • Broncos 17–3
- 10:29 - BSU - Jonah Dalmas 32 yd field goal, 8 plays, 60 yards, TOP 03:34 • Broncos 20–3
- 05:09 - BSU - Scott Matlock 3 yd pass from Hank Bachmeier (Jonah Dalmas kick), 9 plays, 15 yards, TOP 04:23 • Broncos 27–3

BSU Passing Leaders

- Hank Bachmeier – 22/39, 286 yards, 2 TD, 1 INT

BSU Rushing Leaders

- George Holani – 13 rushes, 46 yards

BSU Receiving Leaders

- Khalil Shakir – 7 receptions, 113 yards, 1 TD

BSU Defense Leaders

- JL Skinner – 13 tackles

=== Nevada ===
Nevada Wolf Pack at Boise State Broncos

Quarter	1	2	3	4	Total
Wolf Pack	10	10	18	3	41
Broncos	14	7	3	7	31

at Albertsons Stadium, Boise, ID

- Date: October 2, 2021
- Game time: 1:30 p.m. MDT (Kicked at 1:36 p.m.)
- Game weather: Temperature: 69°F • Weather: Sunny
- Game attendance: 37,426
- Referee: Brandon Cruse
- TV announcers (FS1): Alex Faust (play-by-play) and Petros Papadakis (analyst)
- Pregame Notes, Recap, Postgame Notes, Gamebook

Game information

First quarter

- 10:36 - NEV - Cole Turner 7 yd pass from Carson Strong (Brandon Talton kick), 12 plays, 67 yards, TOP 04:17 • Wolf Pack 7–0
- 07:47 - BSU - Stefan Cobbs 25 yd pass from Hank Bachmeier (Jonah Dalmas kick), 9 plays, 81 yards, TOP 02:43 • Tied 7–7
- 04:54 - NEV - Brandon Talton 38 yd field goal, 9 plays, 54 yards, TOP 02:53 • Wolf Pack 10-7
- 00:53 - BSU - Khalil Shakir 23 yd pass from Hank Bachmeier (Jonah Dalmas kick), 8 plays, 73 yards, TOP 03:55 • Broncos 14–10

Second quarter

- 12:26 - NEV - Devonte Lee 2 yd rush (Brandon Talton kick), 10 plays, 57 yards, TOP 03:21 • Wolf Pack 17–14
- 02:28 - BSU - Stefan Cobbs 5 yd pass from Hank Bachmeier (Jonah Dalmas kick), 3 plays, 40 yards, TOP 01:19 • Broncos 21–17
- 00:00 - NEV - Brandon Talton 37 yd field goal, 11 plays, 56 yards, TOP 02:22 • Broncos 21-20

Third quarter

- 12:55 - NEV - Toa Taua 12 yd rush (Romeo Doubs pass from Carson Strong), 3 plays, 18 yards, TOP 01:55 • Wolf Pack 28–21
- 08:59 - BSU - Jonah Dalmas 31 yd field goal, 9 plays, 61 yards, TOP 03:56 • Wolf Pack 28-24
- 06:01 - NEV - Brandon Talton 33 yd field goal, 6 plays, 59 yards, TOP 02:58 • Wolf Pack 31-24
- 02:40 - NEV - Toa Taua 22 yd rush (Brandon Talton kick), 3 plays, 60 yards, TOP 00:48 • Wolf Pack 38–24

Fourth quarter

- 10:42 - NEV - Brandon Talton 38 yd field goal, 4 plays, 8 yards, TOP 01:55 • Wolf Pack 41-24
- 03:15 - BSU - Octavius Evans 4 yd pass from Hank Bachmeier (Jonah Dalmas kick), 14 plays, 80 yards, TOP 04:54 • Wolf Pack 41-31

BSU Passing Leaders

- Hank Bachmeier – 34/47, 388 yards, 4 TD, 1 INT

BSU Rushing Leaders

- Cyrus Habibi-Likio – 10 rushes, 46 yards

BSU Receiving Leaders

- Stefan Cobbs – 10 receptions, 132 yards, 2 TD

BSU Defense Leaders

- Riley Whimpey – 7 tackles

=== At No. 10 BYU ===
Boise State Broncos at BYU Cougars

Quarter	1	2	3	4	Total
Broncos	3	17	3	3	26
No. 10 Cougars	10	0	0	7	17

at LaVell Edwards Stadium, Provo, UT

- Date: October 9, 2021
- Game time: 1:30 p.m. MDT (Kicked at 1:41 p.m.)
- Game weather: Temperature: 49°F • Wind: SW 6 MPH • Weather: Cloudy
- Game attendance: 63,470
- Referee: Cal McNeill
- TV announcers (ABC): Dave Pasch (play-by-play), Dusty Dvoracek (analyst) and Tom Luginbill (analyst)
- Pregame Notes, Recap, Postgame Notes, Gamebook

Game information

First quarter

- 10:24 - BYU - Jacob Oldroyd 30 yd field goal, 10 plays, 62 yards, TOP 04:36 • Cougars 3-0
- 06:55 - BYU - Samson Nacua 14 yd pass from Jaren Hall (Jacob Oldroyd kick), 5 plays, 84 yards, TOP 02:20 • Cougars 10–0
- 01:25 - BSU - Jonah Dalmas 41 yd field goal, 14 plays, 59 yards, TOP 05:26 • Cougars 10-3

Second quarter

- 06:29 - BSU - Cyrus Habibi-Likio 11 yd rush (Jonah Dalmas kick), 4 plays, 24 yards, TOP 01:30 • Tied 10–10
- 03:34 - BSU - Andrew Van Buren 1 yd rush (Jonah Dalmas kick), 5 plays, 23 yards, TOP 01:00 • Broncos 17–10
- 00:00 - BSU - Jonah Dalmas 20 yd field goal, 9 plays, 43 yards, TOP 02:03 • Broncos 20–10

Third quarter

- 08:20 - BSU - Jonah Dalmas 28 yd field goal, 13 plays, 54 yards, TOP 06:31 • Broncos 23–10

Fourth quarter

- 07:27 - BYU - Tyler Allgeier 1 yd rush (Jacob Oldroyd kick), 4 plays, 70 yards, TOP 01:00 • Broncos 23–17
- 03:27 - BSU - Jonah Dalmas 22 yd field goal, 9 plays, 71 yards, TOP 04:00 • Broncos 26–17

BSU Passing Leaders

- Hank Bachmeier – 18/29, 172 yards

BSU Rushing Leaders

- Cyrus Habibi-Likio – 18 rushes, 75 yards, 1 TD

BSU Receiving Leaders

- Khalil Shakir – 5 receptions, 66 yards

BSU Defense Leaders

- Caleb Biggers – 9 tackles

=== Air Force ===
Air Force Falcons at Boise State Broncos

Quarter	1	2	3	4	Total
Falcons	7	14	0	3	24
Broncos	7	7	0	3	17

at Albertsons Stadium, Boise, ID

- Date: October 16, 2021
- Game time: 7:00 p.m. MDT (Kicked at 7:10 p.m.)
- Game weather: Temperature: 67°F • Wind: SE 15 MPH • Weather: Sunny
- Game attendance: 34,446
- Referee: Kevin Hassell
- TV announcers (FS1): Cory Provus (play-by-play) and Mark Helfrich (analyst)
- Pregame Notes, Recap, Postgame Notes, Gamebook

Game information

First quarter

- 11:15 - BSU - Stefan Cobbs 8 yd pass from Hank Bachmeier (Jonah Dalmas kick), 11 plays, 75 yards, TOP 03:45 • Broncos 7–0
- 04:29 - AFA - Brad Roberts 4 yd run (Anthony Rodriguez kick), 14 plays, 75 yards, TOP 06:46 • Tied 7–7

Second quarter

- 13:53 - AFA - Haaziq Daniels 25 yd run (Anthony Rodriguez kick), 10 plays, 76 yards, TOP 04:19 • Falcons 14–7
- 10:04 - BSU - Andrew Van Buren 11 yd run (Jonah Dalmas kick), 10 plays, 80 yards, TOP 03:41 • Tied 14–14
- 06:12 - AFA - Brad Roberts 1 yd run (Anthony Rodriguez kick), 8 plays, 75 yards, TOP 03:52 • Falcons 21–14

Third quarter

- No scoring plays.

Fourth quarter

- 02:49 - AFA - Matthew Dapore 28 yd field goal, 4 plays, 6 yards, TOP 02:06 • Falcons 24–14
- 00:49 - BSU - Jonah Dalmas 37 yd field goal, 11 plays, 53 yards, TOP 01:56 • Falcons 24–17

BSU Passing Leaders

- Hank Bachmeier – 23/36, 259 yards, 1 TD, 1 INT

BSU Rushing Leaders

- Andrew Van Buren – 15 rushes, 58 yards, 1 TD

BSU Receiving Leaders

- Stefan Cobbs – 6 receptions, 83 yards, 1 TD

BSU Defense Leaders

- Riley Whimpey – 10 tackles

=== At Colorado State ===
Boise State Broncos at Colorado State Rams

Quarter	1	2	3	4	Total
Broncos	0	7	14	7	28
Rams	13	3	3	0	19

at Canvas Stadium, Fort Collins, CO

- Date: October 30, 2021
- Game time: 5:00 p.m. MDT (Kicked at 5:08 p.m.)
- Game weather: Temperature: 57°F • Wind: NE 12 MPH • Weather: Sunny
- Game attendance: 25,221
- Referee: Tuta Salaam
- TV announcers (CBSSN): Rich Waltz (play-by-play) and Aaron Taylor (analyst)
- Pregame Notes, Recap, Postgame Notes, Gamebook

Game information

First quarter

- 09:48 - CSU - Cayden Camper 22 yd field goal, 13 plays, 71 yards, TOP 05:12 • Rams 3–0
- 06:31 - CSU - Cam Butler 30 yd pass from Todd Centeio (Cayden Camper kick), 6 plays, 65 yards, TOP 01:59 • Rams 10–0
- 00:52 - CSU - Cayden Camper 20 yd field goal, 8 plays, 47 yards, TOP 03:25 • Rams 13–0

Second quarter

- 01:50 - BSU - Octavius Evans 9 yd pass from Hank Bachmeier (Jonah Dalmas kick), 13 plays, 97 yards, TOP 06:09 • Rams 13–7
- 00:11 - CSU - Cayden Camper 20 yd field goal, 10 plays, 72 yards, TOP 01:31 • Rams 16–7

Third quarter

- 10:51 - BSU - Octavius Evans 13 yd run (Jonah Dalmas kick), 4 plays, 38 yards, TOP 01:04 • Rams 16–14
- 04:01 - BSU - Stefan Cobbs 11 yd pass from Hank Bachmeier (Jonah Dalmas kick), 13 plays, 97 yards, TOP 04:08 • Broncos 21–16
- 00:44 - CSU - Cayden Camper 28 yd field goal, 8 plays, 65 yards, TOP 03:17 • Broncos 21–19

Fourth quarter

- 09:30 - BSU - Tyneil Hopper 51 yd pass from Hank Bachmeier (Jonah Dalmas kick), 4 plays, 62 yards, TOP 01:53 • Broncos 28–19

BSU Passing Leaders

- Hank Bachmeier – 21/32, 253 yards, 3 TD

BSU Rushing Leaders

- Cyrus Habibi-Likio – 19 rushes, 61 yards

BSU Receiving Leaders

- Khalil Shakir – 9 receptions, 118 yards

BSU Defense Leaders

- Tyreque Jones – 10 tackles

=== At No. 23 Fresno State ===
Boise State Broncos at Fresno State Bulldogs

Quarter	1	2	3	4	Total
Broncos	10	6	7	17	40
No. 23 Bulldogs	0	7	0	7	14

at Bulldog Stadium, Fresno, CA

- Date: November 6, 2021
- Game time: 5:00 p.m. MDT (Kicked at 5:07 p.m.)
- Game weather: Temperature: 70°F • Wind: WNW 6 MPH • Weather: Mostly Sunny
- Game attendance: 41,031
- Referee: Cal McNeill
- TV announcers (CBSSN): John Sadak (play-by-play) and Aaron Murray (analyst)
- Pregame Notes, Recap, Postgame Notes, Gamebook

Game information

First quarter

- 07:17 - BSU - Jonah Dalmas 47 yd field goal, 7 plays, 45 yards, TOP 03:27 • Broncos 3–0
- 06:38 - BSU - Andrew Van Buren 1 yd run (Jonah Dalmas kick), 2 plays, 41 yards, TOP 00:27 • Broncos 10–0

Second quarter

- 12:45 - BSU - Jonah Dalmas 27 yd field goal, 5 plays, 51 yards, TOP 02:04 • Broncos 13–0
- 05:50 - FS - Keric Wheatfall 5 yd pass from Jake Haener (Cesar Silva kick), 5 plays, 54 yards, TOP 02:01 • Broncos 13–7
- 00:41 - BSU - Jonah Dalmas 32 yd field goal, 8 plays, 52 yards, TOP 02:33 • Broncos 16–7

Third quarter

- 06:43 - BSU - Khalil Shakir 10 yd pass from Hank Bachmeier (Jonah Dalmas kick), 11 plays, 80 yards, TOP 04:09 • Broncos 23–7

Fourth quarter

- 13:30 - BSU - Jonah Dalmas 27 yd field goal, 11 plays, 49 yards, TOP 04:42 • Broncos 26–7
- 07:41 - BSU - Andrew Van Buren 1 yd run (Jonah Dalmas kick), 10 plays, 79 yards, TOP 05:12 • Broncos 33–7
- 02:48 - BSU - Tyler Crowe 7 yd run (Jonah Dalmas kick), 5 plays, 23 yards, TOP 03:01 • Broncos 40–7
- 01:10 - FS - Zane Pope 5 yd pass from Jake Haener (Cesar Silva kick), 6 plays, 75 yards, TOP 01:32 • Broncos 40–14

BSU Passing Leaders

- Hank Bachmeier – 15/27, 283 yards, 1 TD

BSU Rushing Leaders

- George Holani – 21 rushes, 117 yards

BSU Receiving Leaders

- Khalil Shakir – 7 receptions, 67 yards, 1 TD

BSU Defense Leaders

- Kaonohi Kaniho – 7 tackles, 1 INT

=== Wyoming ===
Wyoming Cowboys at Boise State Broncos

Quarter	1	2	3	4	Total
Cowboys	0	7	0	6	13
Broncos	7	3	3	10	23

at Albertsons Stadium, Boise, ID

- Date: November 12, 2021
- Game time: 7:00 p.m. MST (Kicked at 7:05 p.m.)
- Game weather: Temperature: 56°F • Wind: N 5 MPH • Weather: Sunny
- Game attendance: 35,454
- Referee: Scott Campbell
- TV announcers (FS1): Dan Hellie (play-by-play) and Petros Papadakis (analyst)
- Pregame Notes, Recap, Postgame Notes, Gamebook

Game information

First quarter

- 03:07 - BSU - Riley Smith 2 yd pass from Hank Bachmeier (Jonah Dalmas kick), 9 plays, 72 yards, TOP 04:20 • Broncos 7–0

Second quarter

- 04:42 - WYO - Titus Swen 7 yd run (John Hoyland kick), 8 plays, 76 yards, TOP 04:28 • Tied 7–7
- 00:00 - BSU - Jonah Dalmas 43 yd field goal 7 plays, 62 yards, TOP 00:52 • Broncos 10–7

Third quarter

- 08:51 - BSU - Jonah Dalmas 38 yd field goal 12 plays, 54 yards, TOP 06:09 • Broncos 13–7

Fourth quarter

- 07:39 - BSU - Andrew Van Buren 12 yd run (Jonah Dalmas kick), 2 plays, 13 yards, TOP 00:52 • Broncos 20–7
- 00:59 - BSU - Jonah Dalmas 29 yd field goal 12 plays, 62 yards, TOP 06:05 • Broncos 23–7
- 00:04 - WYO - Isaiah Neyor 74 yd pass from Levi Williams (Joshua Cobbs pass from Levi Williams failed), 3 plays, 75 yards, TOP 00:55 • Broncos 23–13

BSU Passing Leaders

- Hank Bachmeier – 23/32, 225 yards, 1 TD

BSU Rushing Leaders

- George Holani – 20 rushes, 102 yards

BSU Receiving Leaders

- Khalil Shakir – 8 receptions, 83 yards

BSU Defense Leaders

- Riley Whimpey – 8 tackles

=== New Mexico ===
New Mexico Lobos at Boise State Broncos

Quarter	1	2	3	4	Total
Lobos	0	0	0	0	0
Broncos	10	14	6	7	37

at Albertsons Stadium, Boise, ID

- Date: November 20, 2021
- Game time: 7:00 p.m. MST (Kicked at 7:15 p.m.)
- Game weather: Temperature: 39°F • Wind: NE 4 MPH • Weather: Sunny
- Game attendance: 28,542
- Referee: Mike Cuttone
- TV announcers (FS1): Alex Faust (play-by-play) and Petros Papadakis (analyst)
- Pregame Notes, Recap, Postgame Notes, Gamebook

Game information

First quarter

- 12:33 - BSU - Tyreque Jones 7 yd blocked punt return (Jonah Dalmas kick) • Broncos 7–0
- 00:13 - BSU - Jonah Dalmas 27 yd field goal, 11 plays, 35 yards, TOP 05:15 • Broncos 10-0

Second quarter

- 13:39 - BSU - Dylan Herberg 6 yd blocked punt return (Jonah Dalmas kick) • Broncos 17–0
- 00:00 - BSU - Khalil Shakir 56 yd pass from Hank Bachmeier (Jonah Dalmas kick), 2 plays, 56 yards, TOP 00:17 • Broncos 24–0

Third quarter

- 06:13 - BSU - Jonah Dalmas 46 yd field goal, 9 plays, 35 yards, TOP 03:45 • Broncos 27-0
- 01:03 - BSU - Jonah Dalmas 42 yd field goal, 8 plays, 56 yards, TOP 01:49 • Broncos 30-0

Fourth quarter

- 10:48 - BSU - Jack Sears 1 yd run (Jonah Dalmas kick), 9 plays, 62 yards, TOP 03:16 • Broncos 37-0

BSU Passing Leaders

- Hank Bachmeier – 11/22, 146 yards, 1 TD, 1 INT

BSU Rushing Leaders

- George Holani – 14 rushes, 114 yards

BSU Receiving Leaders

- Khalil Shakir – 7 receptions, 116 yards, 1 TD

BSU Defense Leaders

- JL Skinner – 9 tackles, 1 FR, 1 INT

=== At No. 21 San Diego State ===
Boise State Broncos at San Diego State Aztecs

Quarter	1	2	3	4	Total
Broncos	7	9	0	0	16
No. 21 Aztecs	3	10	14	0	27

at Dignity Health Sports Park, Carson, CA

- Date: November 26, 2021
- Game time: 10:00 a.m. MST (Kicked at 10:06 a.m.)
- Game weather: Temperature: 65°F • Wind: N 4 MPH • Weather: Sunny
- Game attendance: 11,886
- Referee: Steve Baron
- TV announcers (CBS): Rich Waltz (play-by-play) and Aaron Taylor (analyst)
- Pregame Notes, Recap, Postgame Notes, Gamebook

Game information

First quarter

- 04:01 - BSU - Kurt Rafdal 20 yd pass from Hank Bachmeier (Jonah Dalmas kick), 6 plays, 69 yards, TOP 01:58 • Broncos 7–0
- 00:52 - SDSU - Matt Araiza 31 yd field goal, 12 plays, 66 yards, TOP 04:53 • Broncos 7–3

Second quarter

- 11:45 - BSU - Khalil Shakir 13 yd pass from Hank Bachmeier (Jonah Dalmas kick missed), 10 plays, 80 yards, TOP 02:13 • Broncos 13–3
- 08:39 - BSU - Jonah Dalmas 22 yd field goal, 7 plays, 26 yards, TOP 02:16 • Broncos 16–3
- 01:30 - SDSU - Jesse Matthews 29 yd pass from Jordon Brookshire (Matt Araiza kick), 5 plays, 78 yards, TOP 01:34 • Broncos 16–10
- 00:03 - SDSU - Matt Araiza 37 yd field goal, 5 plays, 38 yards, TOP 00:25 • Broncos 16–13

Third quarter

- 09:26 - SDSU - Greg Bell 2 yd rush (Matt Araiza kick), 11 plays, 75 yards, TOP 05:34 • Aztecs 20–16
- 07:46 - SDSU - Jordon Brookshire 16 yd rush (Matt Araiza kick), 3 plays, 43 yards, TOP 00:36 • Aztecs 27–16

Fourth quarter

- No scoring plays.

BSU Passing Leaders

- Hank Bachmeier – 21/40, 222 yards, 2 TD, 2 INT

BSU Rushing Leaders

- George Holani – 20 rushes, 70 yards

BSU Receiving Leaders

- Khalil Shakir – 6 receptions, 74 yards, 1 TD

BSU Defense Leaders

- JL Skinner – 9 tackles

== Players drafted into the NFL ==
Round	Pick	Player	Position	NFL Club
5	148	Khalil Shakir	WR	Buffalo Bills
