= Joel Wilson (American football) =

American football player (born 2000)

No. 83 – Tennessee Titans
- Position: Tight end
- Roster status: Practice squad

Personal information
- Born: June 21, 2000 (age 26); Petoskey, Michigan, U.S.
- Listed height: 6 ft 4 in (1.93 m)
- Listed weight: 245 lb (111 kg)

Career information
- High school: Petoskey
- College: Central Michigan (2018–2022)
- NFL draft: 2023: undrafted

Career history
- New Orleans Saints (2023)*; Buffalo Bills (2023)*; Green Bay Packers (2023–2024)*; New York Giants (2024)*; Chicago Bears (2024)*; Tennessee Titans (2025–present)*
- * Offseason or practice squad member only

Awards and highlights
- Third-team All-MAC (2022)
- Stats at Pro Football Reference

Joel Wilson (born June 21, 2000) is an American professional football tight end for the Tennessee Titans of the National Football League (NFL). He played college football for the Central Michigan Chippewas.

== Early life ==
Wilson attended Petoskey High School in Petoskey, Michigan, where he played quarterback on the football team. He committed to play college football at Central Michigan.

== College career ==
As a freshman in 2018, Wilson caught one pass for five yards. In 2019, he brought in one pass for seven yards and made a tackle as he was limited due to a broken foot. In the shortened 2020 season, Wilson hauled in five receptions for 50 yards. In week three of the 2021 season, Wilson hauled in four passes for 31 yards and his first career touchdown, but Central Michigan lost to LSU 49–21. In the 2021 Sun Bowl, Wilson caught three passes for 41 yards and a touchdowns, as he helped Central Michigan beat Washington State 24–21. Wilson took a big step up in 2021, finishing the year with 31 receptions for 367 yards and six touchdowns. In week four of the 2022 season, Wilson brought in five receptions for 59 yards and a touchdown, but Central Michigan lost versus Penn State 33–14. In week eight, Wilson notched eight receptions for 75 yards and a touchdown, but Central Michigan lost 34–18 against Bowling Green. However, in week ten against Northern Illinois, Wilson caught a touchdown but went down with a season-ending injury. Wilson finished the 2022 season with 44 receptions for 445 yards and six touchdowns. For his performance on the season, Wilson was named third-team All-MAC.

Wilson finished his career at Central Michigan with 82 receptions for 874 yards and 12 touchdowns.

== Professional career ==
Pre-draft measurables
Height	Weight	Arm length	Hand span	Wingspan	20-yard shuttle	Three-cone drill	Vertical jump	Broad jump	Bench press
6 ft 3 5/8 in (1.92 m)	242 lb (110 kg)	32 5/8 in (0.83 m)	10 1/4 in (0.26 m)	6 ft 5 1/2 in (1.97 m)	4.24 s	7.10 s	33.0 in (0.84 m)	9 ft 6 in (2.90 m)	11 reps
All values from Pro Day

=== New Orleans Saints ===
After not being selected in the 2023 NFL draft, Wilson signed with the New Orleans Saints as an undrafted free agent on April 30. However on May 13, Wilson was released by New Orleans after failing his physical.

=== Buffalo Bills ===
On May 22, 2023, Wilson signed with the Buffalo Bills. He was waived on August 29, due to missing practice and re-signed to the practice squad. Wilson was released by the Bills on November 7.

=== Green Bay Packers ===
On November 28, 2023, Wilson was signed to the Green Bay Packers' practice squad. He signed a reserve/future contract with Green Bay on January 22, 2024. Wilson was released by Green Bay on August 27.

=== New York Giants ===
On September 24, 2024, Wilson signed with the New York Giants' practice squad. He was released by New York on October 1.

=== Chicago Bears ===
On October 24, 2024, Wilson signed with the Chicago Bears' practice squad. He signed a reserve/future contract with Chicago on January 6, 2025. On August 25, Wilson was waived by the Bears.

=== Tennessee Titans ===
On September 15, 2025, Wilson signed with the Tennessee Titans' practice squad. He signed a reserve/future contract with Tennessee on January 5, 2026. On August 30, Wilson was waived by the Titans as a part of final roster cuts; he was re-signed to the team's practice squad the next day.
