= Arizona Bowl =

Postseason college football bowl game

- Snoop Dogg Arizona Bowl presented by Gin & Juice by Dre and Snoop
- Stadium: Casino Del Sol Stadium
- Location: Tucson, Arizona
- Operated: 2015–present
- Conference tie-ins: Mountain West, MAC
- Previous conference tie-ins: Sun Belt (2016–2019)
- Payout: US$350,000 (2023)
- Website: thearizonabowl.com

Sponsors
- NOVA Home Loans (2015–2019); Offerpad (2020); Barstool Sports (2021–2023); Gin & Juice by Dre & Snoop (2024–present)

Former names
- NOVA Home Loans Arizona Bowl (2015–2019); Offerpad Arizona Bowl (2020); Barstool Sports Arizona Bowl (2021–2023)

2025 matchup
- Miami (OH) vs. Fresno State (Fresno State 18–3)

The Arizona Bowl is a postseason college football bowl game certified by the NCAA that began play in the 2015 season. The game is held at Casino Del Sol Stadium in Tucson, and starting in 2020 has tie-ins with the Mountain West Conference and Mid-American Conference (MAC). Since 2024, the game has been sponsored by Gin & Juice by Dre and Snoop, the gin-based cocktail brand co-founded by Dr. Dre and Snoop Dogg; it was previously sponsored by the mortgage broker company Nova Home Loans (2015–2019), the real estate agency Offerpad (2020) and Barstool Sports (2021–2023).

== History ==
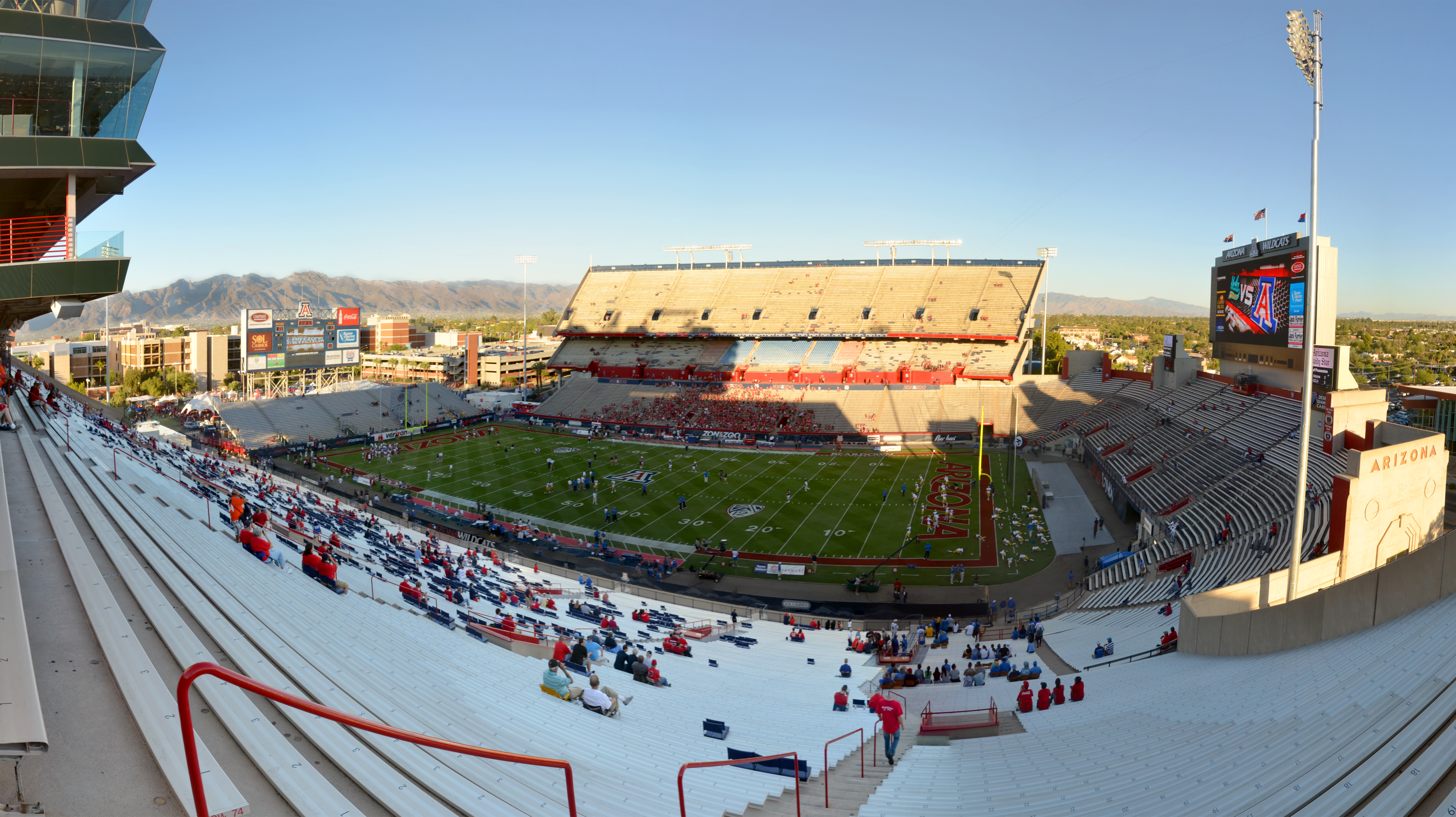
Casino Del Sol Stadium

Alongside the Austin Bowl and Cure Bowl, the Arizona Bowl was one of three new bowl games sanctioned by the NCAA to begin play in the 2015 season (although the Austin Bowl was delayed to 2016, before ultimately being delayed indefinitely due to a moratorium placed on new bowl games by the NCAA). In May 2015, it was reported that the game was to be held at Casino Del Sol Stadium, and feature participants from Conference USA and the Mountain West Conference. It marked a return of post-season college football to Tucson, Arizona, which previously hosted the Copper Bowl (the event now known as the Rate Bowl).

The Arizona Bowl was officially announced on October 1, 2015, as the Nova Home Loans Arizona Bowl. Founded by the Arizona Sports and Entertainment Commission (ASEC), Alan Young, Kemp Ellis, Nikki Balich, the Mountain West Conference and Campus Insiders in a joint venture, the inaugural game was scheduled to be held on December 29, 2015. It was also announced that the Sun Belt Conference would provide a secondary tie-in in case either conference did not have a bowl-eligible team to play the Arizona Bowl.

The inaugural game featured the Nevada Wolf Pack against the Colorado State Rams. As neither Conference USA or the Sun Belt had enough bowl-eligible teams that could be sent to the Arizona Bowl, the game was played between two Mountain West teams, marking the first time since the 1979 Orange Bowl that a non-championship bowl game was played between teams from the same conference. However, the two teams had not played each other during the regular season, as they competed in different divisions.

In May 2016, it was announced that the Sun Belt had reached a four-year deal to serve as a primary tie-in for the Arizona Bowl through 2019, replacing Conference USA. It was the fifth bowl game in which the Sun Belt held a primary tie-in. On July 26, 2019, the bowl announced tie-ins with the Mountain West and Mid-American Conference (MAC) beginning in the 2020 football season and running through the 2025 season.

On October 30, 2020, it was announced that the 2020 game would be played behind closed doors with no spectators admitted due to the COVID-19 pandemic in Arizona.

The 2021 game was canceled after the Boise State Broncos withdrew due to COVID-19 issues within the program. Their scheduled opponent, the Central Michigan Chippewas, were named as a replacement team for the Sun Bowl.

=== Sponsorship ===
The first five editions of the bowl were sponsored by NOVA Home Loans and were officially known as the NOVA Home Loans Arizona Bowl. The company declined to renew its sponsorship in 2020. On December 23, 2020, it was announced that real estate agency Offerpad had signed on as the title sponsor of the game, making it the Offerpad Arizona Bowl.

On July 27, 2021, Barstool Sports was announced as the title sponsor of the game. On August 10, the Pima County Board of Supervisors voted to pull its nearly $40,000 in funding for the game, citing objections to "inflammatory statements and tweets" made in the past by Dave Portnoy, founder of Barstool Sports, including a post from 2010: "Though I never condone rape, if you’re a Size 6 and wearing skinny jeans, you kind of deserve to be raped, right?" Barstool Sports Arizona Bowl remained the bowl's official name through the 2023 playing. On May 6, 2024, Snoop Dogg's drink brand, Gin & Juice by Dre and Snoop, became the new Arizona Bowl title sponsor, with the bowl officially named the Snoop Dogg Arizona Bowl presented by Gin & Juice.

== Game results ==
Date	Winning Team		Losing Team		Attendance	Notes
December 29, 2015	Nevada	28	Colorado State	23	20,425	notes
December 30, 2016	Air Force	45	South Alabama	21	33,868	notes
December 29, 2017	New Mexico State	26	Utah State	20 (OT)	39,132	notes
December 29, 2018	Nevada	16	Arkansas State	13 (OT)	32,368	notes
December 31, 2019	Wyoming	38	Georgia State	17	36,892	notes
December 31, 2020	Ball State	34	No. 19 San Jose State	13	0	notes
December 31, 2021	Boise State forfeited to Central Michigan University per CFP rules enacted in 2021 (Note: Game originally scheduled to be Boise State vs. Central Michigan. However, Boise State withdrew from the game following a COVID-19 outbreak on the team. The game was canceled the following day.)					
December 30, 2022	Ohio	30	Wyoming	27 (OT)	27,691	notes
December 30, 2023	Wyoming	16	Toledo	15	30,428	notes
December 28, 2024	Miami (OH)	43	Colorado State	17	40,076	notes
December 27, 2025	Fresno State	18	Miami (OH)	3	37,232	notes

== MVPs ==
The bowl named an offensive and defensive MVP through the 2020 edition. Since the 2022 edition (the 2021 edition was canceled) a single MVP has been named.

Year	Offensive MVP			Defensive MVP			Ref.
Year	Player	Team	Pos.	Player	Team	Pos.	Ref.
2015	James Butler	Nevada	RB	Ian Seau	Nevada	DE	
2016	Arion Worthman	Air Force	QB	Weston Steelhammer	Air Force	DB	
2017	Larry Rose III	New Mexico State	RB	Leon McQuaker	New Mexico State	LB	
2018	Ty Gangi	Nevada	QB	B. J. Edmonds	Arkansas State	S	
2019	Xazavian Valladay	Wyoming	RB	Alijah Halliburton	Wyoming	S	
2020	Drew Plitt	Ball State	QB	Bryce Cosby	Ball State	S	
Year	Game MVP						Ref.
2022	CJ Harris	Ohio	QB				
2023	John Hoyland	Wyoming	K				
2024	Kevin Davis	Miami (OH)	RB				
2025	E. J. Warner	Fresno State	QB				

== Most appearances ==
Updated through the December 2025 edition (10 games, 20 total appearances).

Teams with multiple appearances

Rank	Team	Appearances	Won	Lost	Win pct.
1	Wyoming	3	2	1	.667
2	Nevada	2	2	0	1.000
2	Miami (OH)	2	1	1	.500
2	Colorado State	2	0	2	.000

Teams with a single appearance

Won (5): Air Force, Ball State, Fresno State, New Mexico State, Ohio
Lost (6): Arkansas State, Georgia State, San Jose State, South Alabama, Toledo, Utah State

== Appearances by conference ==
Updated through the December 2025 edition (10 games, 20 total appearances).

Conference	Record				Appearances by season	
Conference	Games	W	L	Win pct.	Won	Lost
Mountain West	11	6	5	.545	2015, 2016, 2018, 2019, 2023, 2025	2015, 2017, 2020, 2022, 2024
MAC	5	3	2	.600	2020, 2022, 2024	2023, 2025
Sun Belt	4	1	3	.250	2017	2016, 2018, 2019

- The 2015 game was contested between two Mountain West teams.

== Game records ==
Team	Record, Team vs. Opponent	Year
Most points scored (one team)	45, Air Force vs. South Alabama	2016
Most points scored (losing team)	27, Wyoming vs. Ohio	2022
Most points scored (both teams)	66, Air Force (45) vs. South Alabama (21)	2016
Fewest points allowed	3, Fresno State vs. Miami (OH)	2025
Largest margin of victory	24, Air Force (45) vs. South Alabama (21)	2016
Total yards	532, Colorado State vs. Nevada	2015
Rushing yards	290, Wyoming vs. Georgia State	2019
Passing yards	310, Colorado State vs. Nevada	2015
First downs	30, Colorado State vs. Nevada	2015
Fewest yards allowed	192, Fresno State vs. Miami (OH)	2025
Fewest rushing yards allowed	68, Air Force vs. South Alabama	2016
Fewest passing yards allowed	72, Fresno State vs. Miami (OH)	2025
Individual	Record, Player, Team	Year
All-purpose yards	295, Xazavian Valladay (Wyoming) (204 rushing, 91 receiving)	2019
Touchdowns (all-purpose)	2, shared by James Butler (Nevada); Jacobi Owens (Air Force); Xazavian Valladay (Wyoming); Jordon Vaughn (Wyoming)	2015; 2016; 2019; 2022
Rushing yards	204, Xazavian Valladay (Wyoming)	2019
Rushing touchdowns	2, shared by: James Butler (Nevada); Jacobi Owens (Air Force); Jordon Vaughn (Wyoming)	2015; 2016; 2022
Passing yards	310, Nick Stevens (Colorado State)	2015
Passing touchdowns	3, Levi Williams (Wyoming)	2019
Receiving yards	154, Josh Magee (South Alabama)	2016
Receiving touchdowns	1, by various players	
Receptions	9, Rashard Higgins (Colorado State)	2015
Tackles	16, Darrell Songy (South Alabama)	2016
Sacks	2, shared by: Chason Milner (South Alabama); Dajon Emory (Arkansas State); Shane Bonner (Ohio)	2016; 2018; 2022
Interceptions	2, Justin Brent (Nevada)	2018
Long Plays	Record, Player, Team	Year
Touchdown run	80 yds., Jacquez Stuart (Toledo)	2023
Touchdown pass	75 yds., shared by: Josh Magee (South Alabama); Jale Robinette (Air Force)	2016
Kickoff return	100 yds., Jason Huntley (New Mexico State)	2017
Punt return	21 yds., Kenyon Reed (San Jose State)	2020
Interception return	53 yds., Antonio Phillips (Ball State)	2020
Fumble return	29 yds., Nehemiah Shelton (Ball State)	2020
Punt	69 yds., Quinton Conaway (Nevada)	2018
Field goal	53 yds., shared by: Cooper Rothe (Wyoming); John Hoyland (Wyoming)	2019; 2022

== Media coverage ==
The Arizona Bowl would have a "digitally-focused" broadcasting strategy, according to organizers, who announced that the website Campus Insiders (a joint venture of IMG College and Silver Chalice) would hold online streaming rights to the game as its "primary digital media partner". Campus Insiders, in turn, partnered with 120 Sports (a digital sports network that is a joint venture of Silver Chalice, MLB Advanced Media, and Time Inc.) to provide interactive in-game content, as well as pre-game, halftime, and post-game shows for the webcast. Television rights to the 2015 and 2016 games were also held by Sinclair Broadcast Group's American Sports Network; the telecasts were syndicated to local broadcast television stations and regional sports networks.

On April 18, 2017, it was announced that CBS Sports Network had acquired rights to the Arizona Bowl under a "multi-year" deal; Campus Insiders (which merged with ASN to form the new Stadium network) is no longer involved in the broadcast.

For its 2020 edition, the game was promoted to the main CBS network, as the Sun Bowl (which is typically aired by the network) was cancelled due to COVID-19-related complications.

With Barstool Sports' sponsorship of the game, the game returned to a digital broadcast via Barstool's platforms; Barstool founder Dave Portnoy served as the play-by-play commentator, joined by Dan "Big Cat" Katz (Pardon My Take) and Jake Marsh as analysts, and Caleb Pressley and Adam "Rone" Ferrone as sideline reporters. In 2023, the game returned to broadcast television via a sublicensing agreement with The CW, who simulcast the Barstool-produced telecast.

In May 2024, CW Sports renewed its rights to the Arizona Bowl without Barstool's involvement.
