= Caleb Biggers =

American football player (born 1999)

Profile
- Position: Cornerback

Personal information
- Born: November 2, 1999 (age 27); Baltimore, Maryland, U.S.
- Listed height: 5 ft 10 in (1.78 m)
- Listed weight: 202 lb (92 kg)

Career information
- High school: Calvert Hall College
- College: Bowling Green (2018–2020); Boise State (2021–2022)
- NFL draft: 2023: undrafted

Career history
- Cleveland Browns (2023)*
- * Offseason or practice squad member only
- Stats at Pro Football Reference

Caleb Biggers (born November 2, 1999) is an American football cornerback. He played college football at Bowling Green and Boise State.

== Early life ==
Biggers grew up in Baltimore, Maryland and attended high school at Calvert Hall College. Biggers was a dual threat player being a running back and cornerback. In his career on offense he rushed for 107 yards and two touchdowns, and on defense he recorded 42 tackles, four going for a loss, a sack, two interceptions, a forced fumble, and a fumble recovery. Biggers would decide to commit to Bowling Green to play college football.

== College career ==
Biggers would play at Bowling Green for three years. In those three years he totaled 100 tackles, with four going for a loss, four pass deflections, a fumble recovery, and a touchdown. After those three years with Bowling Green, Biggers would decide to transfer to Boise State. In Biggers first season with Boise State he totalled 34 tackles and five pass deflections. In the 2022 season Biggers would have his best season in which he racked up 39 tackles, five going for a loss, a sack, four pass deflections, a forced fumble, a fumble recovery, and his one career interception. For his performance on the year Biggers would be named an honorable mention All Mountain West Team. After the conclusion of the 2022 season Biggers would declare for the NFL draft.

== Professional career ==
Pre-draft measurables
Height	Weight	Arm length	Hand span	40-yard dash	10-yard split	20-yard split	20-yard shuttle	Three-cone drill	Vertical jump	Bench press
5 ft 10 1/4 in (1.78 m)	202 lb (92 kg)	31 1/8 in (0.79 m)	9 1/4 in (0.23 m)	4.58 s	1.60 s	2.69 s	4.25 s	7.01 s	33.5 in (0.85 m)	23 reps
All values from Pro Day

After not being selected in the 2023 NFL draft, Biggers would sign with the Cleveland Browns as an undrafted free agent. On August 27, 2023, Biggers was released by the Browns.
