= Kalil Pimpleton =

American gridiron football player (born 1998)

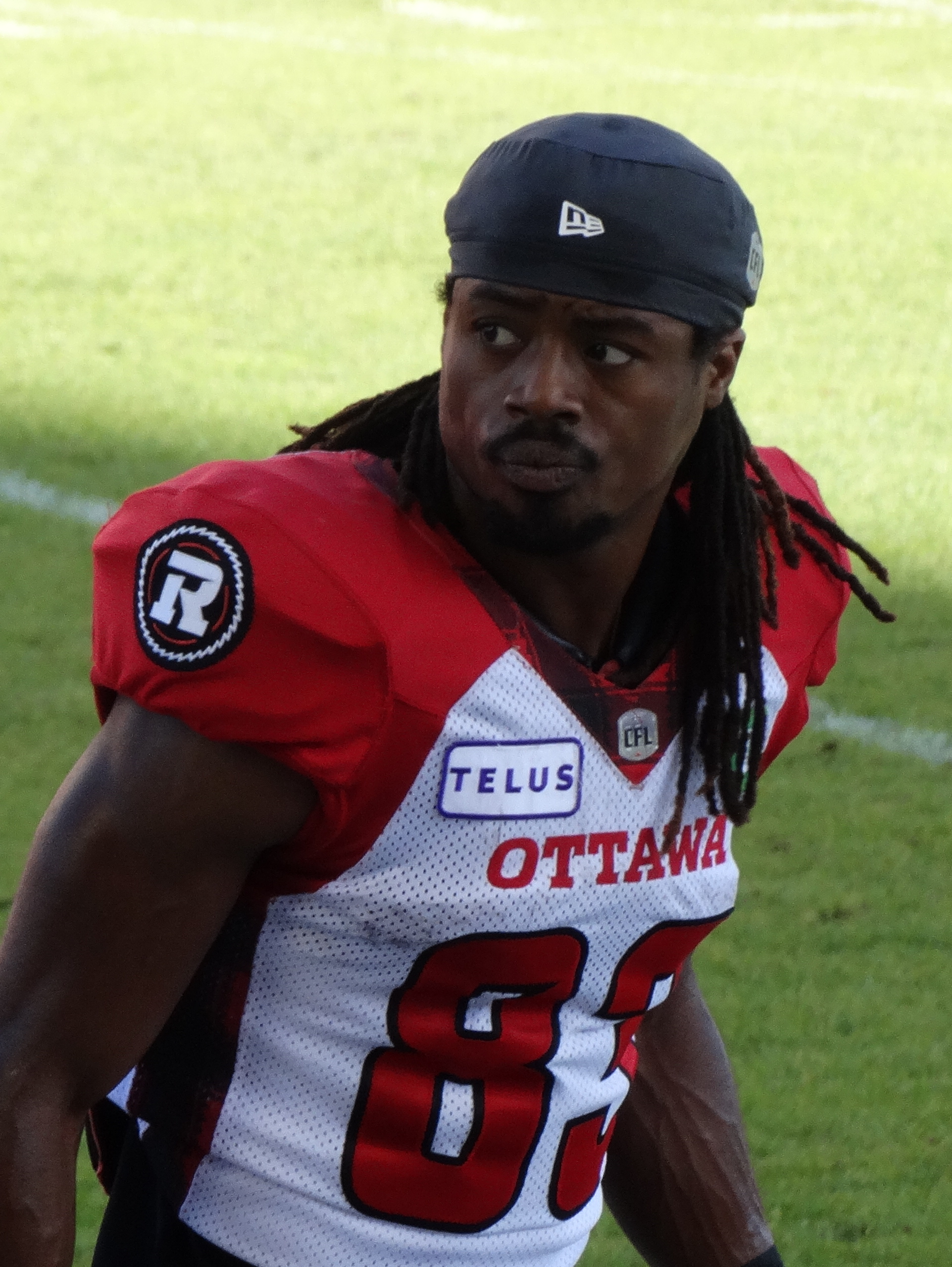
- Pimpleton with the Ottawa Redblacks in 2024

No. 83 – Ottawa Redblacks
- Position: Wide receiver

Personal information
- Born: December 9, 1998 (age 27); Muskegon, Michigan, U.S.
- Listed height: 5 ft 8 in (1.73 m)
- Listed weight: 175 lb (79 kg)

Career information
- High school: Muskegon (MI)
- College: Virginia Tech (2017); Central Michigan (2018–2021)
- NFL draft: 2022: undrafted

Career history
- Detroit Lions (2022)*; New York Giants (2022–2023)*; Ottawa Redblacks (2024–present)
- * Offseason or practice squad member only

Awards and highlights
- MAC Special Teams Player of the Year (2021); 2× First-team All-MAC (2019, 2021); Second-team All-MAC (2020)

Career CFL statistics as of 2025
- Receptions: 113
- Receiving yards: 1,437
- Return yards: 1,819
- Total touchdowns: 6
- Stats at CFL.ca
- Stats at Pro Football Reference

Kalil Pimpleton (born December 9, 1998) is an American professional football wide receiver for the Ottawa Redblacks of the Canadian Football League (CFL). He played college football at Central Michigan and went undrafted during the 2022 NFL draft.

== College career ==
He signed with Virginia Tech out of high school and played in four games in 2017 before transferring to Central Michigan where he played from 2019 to 2021. He earned MAC Special Teams Player of the Year honors in 2021 for his kick returning and was a first team All-MAC wide receiver.

== Professional career ==
Pre-draft measurables
Height	Weight	Arm length	Hand span	Wingspan	40-yard dash	10-yard split	20-yard split	20-yard shuttle	Three-cone drill	Vertical jump	Broad jump	Bench press
5 ft 7 5/8 in (1.72 m)	172 lb (78 kg)	28 7/8 in (0.73 m)	8 7/8 in (0.23 m)	5 ft 9 5/8 in (1.77 m)	4.49 s	1.52 s	2.50 s	4.04 s	6.93 s	33.5 in (0.85 m)	9 ft 10 in (3.00 m)	14 reps
All values from Pro Day

=== Detroit Lions ===
On April 30, 2022, Pimpleton was signed by the Detroit Lions after going undrafted. On August 29, Pimpleton was waived by the Lions.

=== New York Giants ===
On September 1, 2022, Pimpleton was signed to the New York Giants practice squad. He signed a reserve/future contract on January 22, 2023. He was waived on August 29, 2023.

=== Ottawa Redblacks ===
Pimpleton signed with the Ottawa Redblacks on January 23, 2024. Following training camp in 2024, he began the season on the injured list, but soon after made his CFL debut in week 6 on July 14, 2024, against the Edmonton Elks. In that game, Pimpleton scored his first career touchdown, on a 70-yard touchdown catch thrown by Dru Brown, and recorded a 100-yard game.

== Career statistics ==
=== Regular season ===
Year	Team	Games		Receiving				Rushing				Kick returns				Punt returns			
Year	Team	GP	GS	Rec	Yds	Avg	TD	Att	Yds	Avg	TD	Ret	Yds	Avg	TD	Ret	Yds	Avg	TD
2024	OTT	8	8	45	715	15.9	3	2	7	3.5	0	10	237	23.7	0	15	252	16.8	1
2025	OTT	18	18	68	722	10.6	1	3	12	4.0	0	34	735	21.6	0	48	595	12.4	1
2026	OTT	6	5	15	244	16.3	0	1	3	3.0	0	23	684	29.7	1	25	302	12.1	0
Career		32	31	128	1,681	13.1	4	6	22	3.7	0	67	1,656	24.7	1	88	1,149	13.1	2

=== College ===
Year	Team	GP	Receiving				Rushing				Kick returns				Punt returns			
Year	Team	GP	Rec	Yds	Avg	TD	Att	Yds	Avg	TD	Ret	Yds	Avg	TD	Ret	Yds	Avg	TD
2017	Virginia Tech	5	0	0	0.0	0	1	4	4.0	0	0	0	0.0	0	0	0	0.0	0
2018	Central Michigan	Did not play due to NCAA transfer rules																
2019	Central Michigan	14	82	894	10.9	6	7	81	11.6	0	0	0	0.0	0	24	208	8.7	0
2020	Central Michigan	6	26	277	10.7	2	16	134	8.4	3	2	26	13.0	0	8	55	6.9	0
2021	Central Michigan	13	62	960	15.5	4	16	84	5.3	2	0	0	0.0	0	16	305	19.1	2
Career		38	170	2,131	12.5	12	40	303	7.6	5	2	26	13.0	0	48	568	11.8	2
