= Lew Nichols III =

American football player (born 2001)

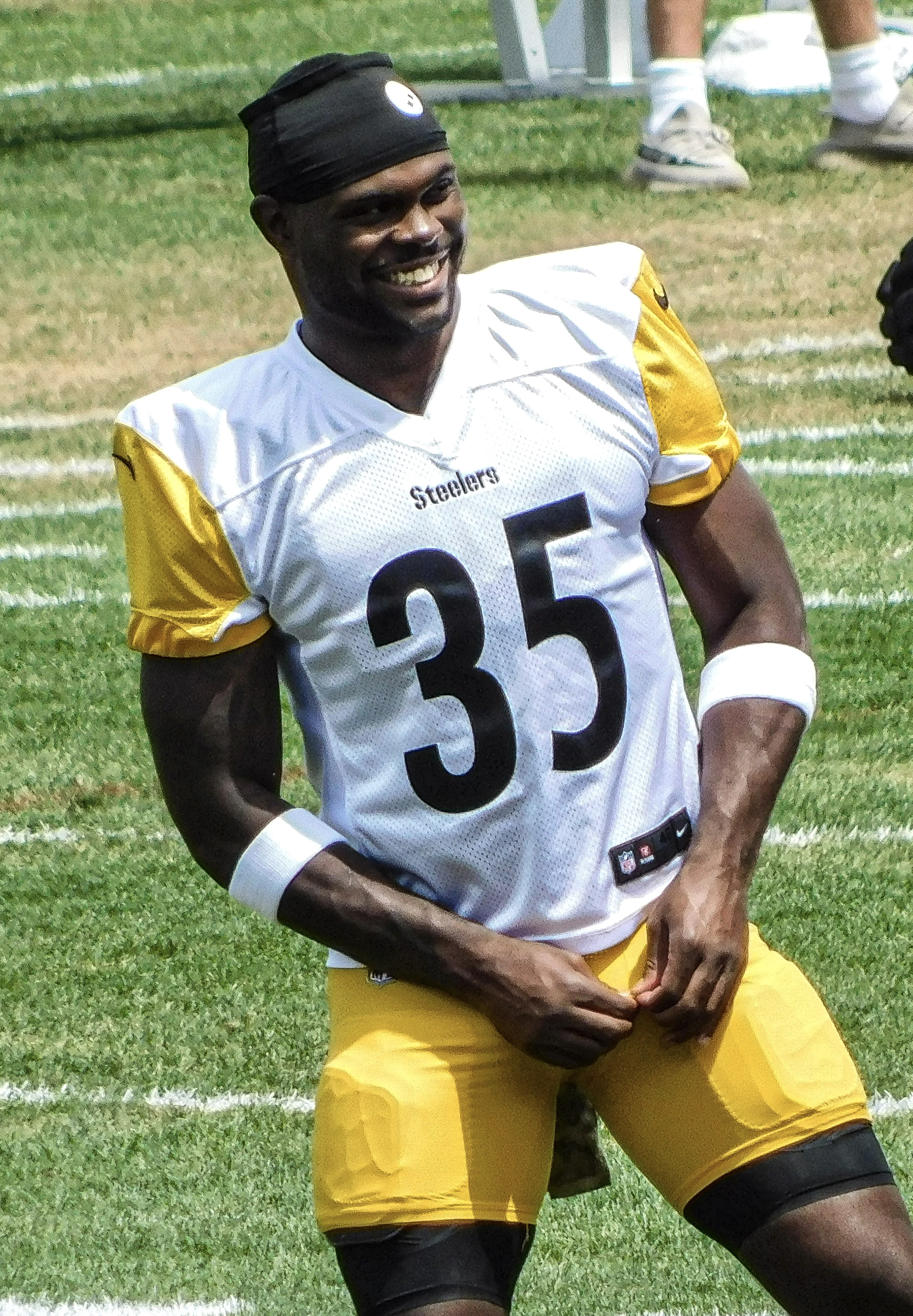
- Nichols with the Pittsburgh Steelers in 2025

No. 31 – Pittsburgh Steelers
- Position: Running back
- Roster status: Active

Personal information
- Born: August 16, 2001 (age 25); Detroit, Michigan, U.S.
- Listed height: 5 ft 10 in (1.78 m)
- Listed weight: 220 lb (100 kg)

Career information
- High school: Cass Tech (Detroit)
- College: Central Michigan (2019–2022)
- NFL draft: 2023: 7th round, 235th overall pick

Career history
- Green Bay Packers (2023)*; Philadelphia Eagles (2023–2024)*; Pittsburgh Steelers (2025–present)
- * Offseason or practice squad member only

Awards and highlights
- Super Bowl champion (LIX); MAC Offensive Player of the Year (2021); First-team All-MAC (2021); MAC Offensive Freshman of the Year (2020)

Career NFL statistics as of 2026
- Games played: 1
- Total tackles: 1
- Rushing yards: 0
- Stats at Pro Football Reference

Arthur Lewis Nichols III (born August 16, 2001) is an American professional football running back for the Pittsburgh Steelers of the National Football League (NFL). He played college football for the Central Michigan Chippewas. During the 2021 regular season, he led the NCAA Division I Football Bowl Subdivision with 1,710 rushing yards.

== Early life ==
Nichols attended Cass Technical High School in Detroit. He played football under Cass Tech head coach Thomas Wilcher. As a senior in 2018, Nichols rushed for 1,078 yards and 23 touchdowns on 84 carries. He was named to all-state teams selected by the Detroit Free Press, The Detroit News, and the Associated Press.

== College career ==
During the 2019 season, Nichols appeared in four games for Central Michigan, carrying 19 times for 89 yards. As a redshirt freshman during the COVID 19-shortened 2020 season, Nichols rushed for 196 yards and two fourth-quarter touchdowns in a 31–23 victory over rival Eastern Michigan. For the season, he rushed for 508 yards on 78 carries, an average of 6.5 yards per carry. He won the Mid-American Conference (MAC) freshman of the year award.

Due to special eligibility rules enacted for the 2020 season, Nichols repeated as a redshirt freshman in 2021. He led all players in NCAA Division I Football Bowl Subdivision (FBS) with 1,710 rushing yards during the 2021 regular season. He also led the nation with 311 carries. His He had nine 100-yard rushing games in 2021, including totals of 219 yards against Ball State, 215 yards against Kent State, 194 yards against Eastern Michigan, 192 yards against Northern Illinois, and 186 yards against Ohio. His 1,710 yards was the second highest single-season total in Central Michigan history (behind Brian Pruitt's 1,890 yards in 1994).

After the 2021 season ended, Nichols was named the MAC Offensive Player of the Year. Despite leading the nation in rushing, Nichols was not selected as a semifinalist for the Doak Walker Award.

=== Statistics ===
Year	Team	GP	Rushing				Receiving			
Year	Team	GP	Att	Yds	Avg	TD	Rec	Yds	Avg	TD
2019	Central Michigan	4	19	89	4.7	0	0	0	–	0
2020	Central Michigan	6	78	507	6.5	4	10	109	10.9	1
2021	Central Michigan	13	341	1,848	5.4	16	40	338	8.5	2
2022	Central Michigan	9	176	616	3.5	6	21	128	6.1	0
Career		32	614	3,060	5.0	26	71	575	8.1	3

== Professional career ==
Pre-draft measurables
Height	Weight	Arm length	Hand span	Wingspan	40-yard dash	10-yard split	20-yard split	20-yard shuttle	Three-cone drill	Vertical jump	Broad jump	Bench press
5 ft 10 1/8 in (1.78 m)	220 lb (100 kg)	31 1/4 in (0.79 m)	9 in (0.23 m)	6 ft 3 1/8 in (1.91 m)	4.61 s	1.55 s	2.58 s	4.20 s	7.43 s	37.0 in (0.94 m)	9 ft 7 in (2.92 m)	22 reps
All values from Pro Day

=== Green Bay Packers ===
Nichols was selected 235th overall by the Green Bay Packers in the 2023 NFL draft. He signed his rookie contract on May 5. He was waived/injured on August 29, 2023, and placed on injured reserve, then released on September 7.

=== Philadelphia Eagles ===
On October 16, 2023, the Philadelphia Eagles signed Nichols to their practice squad. He signed a reserve/future contract with Philadelphia on January 18, 2024.

On August 27, 2024 Nichols was waived by the Eagles. He was re-signed to the practice squad on December 26. However, Nichols was released again on December 31. On January 30, 2025, Nichols was re-signed to the practice squad. On July 22, Nichols was waived by the Eagles.

=== Pittsburgh Steelers ===
On July 29, 2025, Nichols signed with the Pittsburgh Steelers. Nichols was waived on August 25, and re-signed to the practice squad. He made his NFL debut on November 2 against the Indianapolis Colts, playing on special teams and combining on one tackle. On January 14, 2026, he signed a reserve/futures contract with Pittsburgh.

On August 30, 2026, Nichols was waived by the Steelers as a part of final roster cuts; he was re-signed to the team's practice squad the following day. He was promoted to the active roster on October 17.
