= Daniel Richardson =

American football player (born 2001)

No. 10
- Position: Quarterback

Personal information
- Born: January 2, 2001 (age 25); Miami, Florida, U.S.
- Listed height: 5 ft 10 in (1.78 m)
- Listed weight: 205 lb (93 kg)

Career information
- High school: Carol City (Miami Gardens, Florida)
- College: Central Michigan (2019–2022); Florida Atlantic (2023); Florida A&M (2024)
- Stats at ESPN

Daniel Richardson (born January 2, 2001) is an American former college football player who was a quarterback for the Central Michigan Chippewas, Florida Atlantic Owls, and Florida A&M Rattlers,

== Early life ==
Richardson attended Miami Carol City Senior High School in Miami Gardens, Florida. As a freshman in 2015, he started for the team, leading his team to a state championship with 2,765 passing yards with 33 touchdown passes, leading passing in the Miami-Dade County. In his sophomore year in 2016, he was named South Florida Player of the Year with 2,443 passing yard and 33 touchdown passes to lead Miami-Dade County in passing. Richardson played another two seasons with Carol City, leading him to the current Miami-Dade County passing yards and touchdowns record with 9,791 and 116 respectively as of October 2023. As a three-star recruit, Richardson committed to play college football at Central Michigan University.

== College career ==
Richardson served as a backup quarterback in his true freshman season behind Quinten Dormady. As a true freshman, Richardson made his college football debut in the 2019 New Mexico Bowl against San Diego State, rushing for 3 yards and passing for 1 yard during the game. Richardson became the starting quarterback in his redshirt freshman season for the 2020 shortened season leading the Bears to a 3–1 start, throwing 714 yards and four touchdowns before a leg injury in November kept him out of the team's remaining two games for the season. To begin his 2021 season, he sat three games on the bench before entering his first game of the season in the third quarter against the FIU Panthers, in which he threw 276 yards and three touchdowns for a comeback to win the game 31–27. He claimed the starting role after the game, throwing 2,633 yards and 24 touchdowns, his best season with Central Michigan. Richardson began the 2022 season as the starting quarterback, throwing 1,988 yards and 15 touchdowns in his final season with Central Michigan.

On December 6, 2022, Richardson announced that he had entered the transfer portal as a graduate transfer. On January 7, 2023, Richardson had announced his transfer to Florida Atlantic. Richardson had gained the starting role for quarterback at Florida Atlantic after Casey Thompson had torn his ACL in a game against Clemson. He re-entered the transfer portal on December 5, 2023.

On December 20, 2023, Richardson announced that he would be transferring to Florida A&M. He gained the role as the starting quarterback.

=== College statistics ===
Year	Team	Games			Passing								Rushing			
Year	Team	GP	GS	Record	Comp	Att	Pct	Yards	Avg	TD	Int	Rate	Att	Yards	Avg	TD
2019	Central Michigan	3	0	0–0	1	3	33.3	1	0.3	0	0	36.1	1	3	3.0	0
2020	Central Michigan	4	4	3–1	64	100	64.0	769	7.7	4	2	137.8	14	-14	-1.0	1
2021	Central Michigan	13	9	7–2	191	316	60.4	2,633	8.3	24	6	151.7	23	-38	-1.87	0
2022	Central Michigan	12	10	4–6	179	318	56.3	1,988	6.3	15	5	121.2	33	-55	-1.7	0
2023	Florida Atlantic	11	9	3–6	208	318	65.4	2,001	6.3	13	10	125.5	42	-62	-1.5	0
2024	Florida A&M	12	12	7–5	231	330	70.0	2,662	8.1	23	8	155.9	48	-16	-0.3	0
Career		55	44	24–20	874	1,385	63.1	10,054	7.3	79	31	138.4	161	-182	-1.1	1

== Professional career ==
Pre-draft measurables
Height	Weight	Arm length	Hand span	40-yard dash	10-yard split	20-yard shuttle	Three-cone drill	Vertical jump	Broad jump
5 ft 9 3/8 in (1.76 m)	203 lb (92 kg)	31 3/8 in (0.80 m)	9 in (0.23 m)	5.09 s	1.78 s	4.72 s	7.75 s	26.0 in (0.66 m)	8 ft 2 in (2.49 m)
All values from HBCU Combine
