= Lincoln Victor =

American football player (born 2001)

Profile
- Position: Wide receiver

Personal information
- Born: March 1, 2001 (age 25); Pukalani, Hawaii, U.S.
- Listed height: 5 ft 9 in (1.75 m)
- Listed weight: 177 lb (80 kg)

Career information
- High school: Union (Camas, Washington)
- College: Hawaii (2019–2020); Washington State (2021–2023)
- NFL draft: 2024: undrafted

Career history
- Denver Broncos (2024)*; Ottawa Redblacks (2024)*
- * Offseason or practice squad member only

Lincoln Victor (born March 1, 2001) is an American professional football wide receiver. He was most recently a member of the Ottawa Redblacks of the Canadian Football League (CFL). He played college football for the Hawaii Rainbow Warriors and the Washington State Cougars and was signed by the Denver Broncos as an undrafted free agent in 2024.

== Early life ==
Victor was born in Pukalani, Hawaii and attended high school at Union High School in Camas, Washington. In Victor's senior season of high school he was named the Washington high school Player of the Year. Victor committed to play college football for the Hawaii Rainbow Warriors.

== College career ==
=== Hawaii ===
In Victor's first career season in 2019 he recorded ten receptions for three touchdowns, while also rushing for 49 yards. Victor also returned 22 kickoffs for 494 yards. In the COVID-19-shortened 2020 season, Victor recorded two receptions for 17 yards. After the conclusion of the 2020 season, Victor entered the NCAA transfer portal.

=== Washington State ===
Victor transferred to play for the Washington State Cougars to play out the rest of his college career. In Victor's first season with the Cougars in 2021 he recorded 22 receptions for 296 yards and two touchdowns, while also adding ten rushing yards. Victor opened up the 2022 season, as a starter and a team captain for the Cougars. Victor finished the 2022 season with 22 receptions for 245 yards, while also returning 22 kickoffs for 445 yards. Victor opened the 2023 season strong, as in week one he totaled 11 receptions for 168 yards in a win over Colorado State. In the following week, he recorded seven receptions for 62 yards and a touchdown, as he helped Washington State upset Wisconsin. In week three, he recorded six receptions for 119 yards and two touchdowns, in a win over Northern Colorado. In week eight, he had a record-breaking performance as he notched a Washington State-record 16 receptions while also adding 161 yards, in a loss versus Oregon.

== Professional career ==
Pre-draft measurables
Height	Weight	Arm length	Hand span	40-yard dash	10-yard split	20-yard split	20-yard shuttle	Three-cone drill	Vertical jump	Broad jump	Bench press
5 ft 8 in (1.73 m)	178 lb (81 kg)	28 3/4 in (0.73 m)	8 5/8 in (0.22 m)	4.57 s	1.60 s	2.69 s	4.11 s	6.82 s	39 in (0.99 m)	9 ft 11 in (3.02 m)	11 reps
All values from Pro Day

=== Denver Broncos ===
Victor signed with the Denver Broncos as an undrafted free agent on May 10, 2024, but was waived three days later.

=== Ottawa Redblacks ===
On September 18, 2024, Victor was added to the Ottawa Redblacks' practice roster. He was part of the final training camp cuts on May 31, 2025.
