= Alex Miller (American football coach) =

American football player and coach (born 1984)

Biographical details
- Born: May 26, 1984 (age 42); Washington, D.C., U.S.

Playing career
- 2003–2006: UMass
- Position: Center

Coaching career (HC unless noted)
- 2008: Oregon (intern)
- 2009–2010: Oregon (GA)
- 2011: New Hampshire (G/C)
- 2012–2015: New Hampshire (OL)
- 2016–2020: New Hampshire (OL/RCG)
- 2021: UMass (OL)
- 2021: UMass (interim HC)
- 2022–2024: UMass (assoc. HC/OL)

Head coaching record
- Overall: 0–3

Alexander Logue Miller (born May 26, 1984) is an American college football coach and former player. He was the offensive line coach for the University of Massachusetts Amherst from 2022 to 2024. He previously served as the interim head coach at the University of Massachusetts Amherst, replacing Walt Bell, who was fired toward the end of the 2021 season. He was promoted from the position of offensive line coach, and had spent a decade on the coaching staff at the University of New Hampshire prior to arriving at UMass in 2021. He was replaced by Don Brown who was named head coach after he finished the season as defensive coordinator of the Arizona Wildcats.

== Playing career ==
Miller attended Chantilly High School in Chantilly, Virginia, where he played football and basketball. He was named to the second All-State and first All-District teams in football during his senior year. He began his college career at University of Massachusetts Amherst (UMass) in 2002, but did not see playing time until his redshirt freshman season in 2003. From the 2003 to 2006 seasons, Miller started in all 50 of his games as a center for the Minutemen. He accumulated numerous awards during his playing time at UMass; he was named to the Atlantic 10 Conference first team following his redshirt junior and redshirt senior seasons, and was named to the AFCA and TSN All-America teams, among others. During his senior season, Miller served as a team captain. He concluded his playing career with an appearance in the 2006 NCAA Division I Football Championship Game, where the third-ranked Minutemen were defeated by No. 1 Appalachian State.

== Coaching career ==
Miller began his coaching career at the University of Oregon in 2008. After interning for the first year, he was promoted to graduate assistant for 2009 and 2010. Offensive coordinator Chip Kelly succeeded Mike Bellotti as head coach in Oregon in 2009 and revolutionized Oregon's offense, leading to an appearance in the 2011 BCS National Championship Game at the end of the 2010 season. Recalled Miller, "I know sometimes as a play-caller, you think, 'Aw, they’re going to get onto us at some point,' but he just went after you until you stopped it." Miller departed Oregon after the 2010 season to become an assistant under Sean McDonnell at the University of New Hampshire. Kelly, himself a veteran of McDonnell's staff, recommended Miller for the opening.

Miller spent a decade at New Hampshire. For the 2011 season, he coached guards and centers. He was promoted in 2012, gaining responsibility for the entire offensive line. UNH added the title of "running game coordinator" in 2016. Miller returned to his alma mater in 2021, succeeding Micah James as offensive line coach under third-year head coach Walt Bell. UMass fired Bell in November 2021, following a loss to Rhode Island, and named Miller interim head coach.

Head coach Don Brown again named him offensive line coach in December, 2021.

== Personal life ==
Miller attended the University of Massachusetts Amherst, graduating in 2007 with a degree in sociology. He is married to Kristin Walker, a fellow 2007 UMass graduate; the couple has two children.

== Head coaching record ==
Year	Team	Overall	Conference	Standing	Bowl/playoffs
UMass Minutemen (NCAA Division I FBS independent) (2021)
2021	UMass	0–3 (Note: Miller took over as interim coach after nine games)			
UMass:		0–3	0–0		
Total:		0–3			
