= 2021 UMass Minutemen football team =

American college football season

2021 UMass Minutemen football
- Conference: Independent
- Record: 1–11
- Head coach: Walt Bell (3rd season; first 9 games); Alex Miller (interim; final 3 games)
- Offensive scheme: Spread
- Defensive coordinator: Tommy Restivo (3rd season; first 9 games)
- Base defense: 4–3
- Home stadium: Warren McGuirk Alumni Stadium

2021 NCAA Division I FBS independents football records
	Conf.			Overall
Team	W		L	W		L
No. 8 Notre Dame		–		11	–	2
No. 19 BYU		–		10	–	3
Army		–		9	–	4
Liberty		–		8	–	5
New Mexico State		–		2	–	10
UMass		–		1	–	11
UConn		–		1	–	11
Rankings from AP Poll

The 2021 UMass Minutemen football team represented the University of Massachusetts Amherst in the 2021 NCAA Division I FBS football season. The Minutemen played their home games at Warren McGuirk Alumni Stadium and competed as an independent. They were led by third-year head coach Walt Bell; UMass fired Bell after nine games and offensive line coach Alex Miller took over as interim head coach.

== Schedule ==
Date	Time	Opponent	Site	TV	Result	Attendance
September 4	4:00 p.m.	at Pittsburgh	Heinz Field; Pittsburgh, PA	ACCN	L 7–51	41,486
September 11	3:30 p.m.	Boston College	Warren McGuirk Alumni Stadium; Hadley, MA (rivalry)	NESN+	L 28–45	12,118
September 18	3:30 p.m.	Eastern Michigan	Warren McGuirk Alumni Stadium; Hadley, MA	NESN+	L 28–42	7,012
September 25	1:00 p.m.	at No. 17 Coastal Carolina	Brooks Stadium; Conway, SC	ESPN+	L 3–53	15,261
October 2	12:00 p.m.	Toledo	Warren McGuirk Alumni Stadium; Hadley, MA	NESN	L 7–45	9,456
October 9	3:30 p.m.	UConn	Warren McGuirk Alumni Stadium; Hadley, MA (rivalry)	NESN	W 27–13	12,765
October 23	12:00 p.m.	at Florida State	Doak Campbell Stadium; Tallahassee, FL	ACCN	L 3–59	51,915
October 30	12:00 p.m.	at Liberty	Williams Stadium; Lynchburg, VA	ESPN3	L 17–62	16,577
November 6	3:30 p.m.	Rhode Island	Warren McGuirk Alumni Stadium; Hadley, MA	NESN/NESN+	L 22–35	7,284
November 13	12:00 p.m.	Maine	Warren McGuirk Alumni Stadium; Hadley, MA	NESN/NESN+	L 10–35	5,331
November 20	12:00 p.m.	at Army	Michie Stadium; West Point, NY	CBSSN	L 17–33	23,610
November 27	3:00 p.m.	at New Mexico State	Aggie Memorial Stadium; Las Cruces, NM	AggieVision	L 27–44	6,632
Rankings from AP Poll released prior to the game; All times are in Eastern time

== Game summaries ==
=== At Pittsburgh ===
	1	2	3	4	Total
Minutemen	0	0	0	7	7
Panthers	13	10	14	14	51

Statistics	MASS	PITT
First downs	11	35
Total yards	209	598
Rushing yards	42	223
Passing yards	167	375
Turnovers	1	2
Time of possession	29:12	30:48

Team	Category	Player	Statistics
UMass	Passing	Tyler Lytle	14/31, 167 yards
UMass	Rushing	Kayron Lynch-Adams	11 rushes, 32 yards
UMass	Receiving	Jermaine Johnson	3 receptions, 52 yards
Pittsburgh	Passing	Kenny Pickett	27/37, 272 yards, 2 TD
Pittsburgh	Rushing	Rodney Hammond Jr.	8 rushes, 45 yards
Pittsburgh	Receiving	Lucas Krull	5 receptions, 58 yards, TD

=== Boston College ===
	1	2	3	4	Total
Eagles	14	0	21	10	45
Minutemen	0	0	21	7	28

Statistics	BC	MASS
First downs	24	20
Total yards	475	335
Rushing yards	254	121
Passing yards	221	214
Turnovers	2	3
Time of possession	32:24	27:36

Team	Category	Player	Statistics
Boston College	Passing	Dennis Grosel	11/14, 199 yards, TD
Boston College	Rushing	Patrick Garwo III	15 rushes, 160 yards
Boston College	Receiving	Trae Berry	5 receptions, 98 yards, TD
UMass	Passing	Brady Olson	14/29, 214 yards, 3 TD, 2 INT
UMass	Rushing	Ellis Merriweather	11 rushes, 56 yards
UMass	Receiving	Rico Arnold	2 receptions, 85 yards, TD

=== Eastern Michigan ===
	1	2	3	4	Total
Eagles	14	7	7	14	42
Minutemen	0	7	7	14	28

Statistics	EMU	MASS
First downs	26	30
Total yards	507	519
Rushing yards	184	209
Passing yards	323	310
Turnovers	1	2
Time of possession	29:29	30:31

Team	Category	Player	Statistics
Eastern Michigan	Passing	Ben Bryant	14/21, 298 yards, TD
Eastern Michigan	Rushing	Jawon Hamilton	16 rushes, 122 yards, TD
Eastern Michigan	Receiving	Hassan Beydoun	6 receptions, 101 yards
UMass	Passing	Brady Olson	22/38, 285 yards, 2 TD, INT
UMass	Rushing	Ellis Merriweather	23 rushes, 144 yards
UMass	Receiving	Melvin Hill	4 receptions, 82 yards, TD

=== At No. 17 Coastal Carolina ===
	1	2	3	4	Total
Minutemen	0	0	0	3	3
No. 17 Chanticleers	13	23	14	3	53

Statistics	MASS	CCU
First downs	13	30
Total yards	153	558
Rushing yards	28	312
Passing yards	125	246
Turnovers	0	0
Time of possession	26:06	33:54

Team	Category	Player	Statistics
UMass	Passing	Brady Olson	14/23, 81 yards
UMass	Rushing	Ellis Merriweather	6 rushes, 30 yards
UMass	Receiving	Rico Arnold	4 receptions, 38 yards
Coastal Carolina	Passing	Grayson McCall	10/14, 162 yards, 2 TD
Coastal Carolina	Rushing	Braydon Bennett	8 rushes, 83 yards, TD
Coastal Carolina	Receiving	Jaivon Heiligh	5 receptions, 118 yards, TD

=== Toledo ===
	1	2	3	4	Total
Rockets	7	24	7	7	45
Minutemen	0	0	0	7	7

Statistics	TOL	MASS
First downs	22	8
Total yards	455	134
Rushing yards	223	23
Passing yards	232	111
Turnovers	0	4
Time of possession	34:55	25:05

Team	Category	Player	Statistics
Toledo	Passing	Carter Bradley	11/18, 110 yards, TD
Toledo	Rushing	Bryant Koback	11 rushes, 82 yards, 2 TD
Toledo	Receiving	Isaiah Winstead	4 receptions, 75 yards
UMass	Passing	Brady Olson	9/22, 106 yards, TD, INT
UMass	Rushing	Kayron Lynch-Adams	12 rushes, 23 yards
UMass	Receiving	Rico Arnold	3 receptions, 44 yards

=== UConn ===
	1	2	3	4	Total
Huskies	10	0	0	3	13
Minutemen	7	0	3	17	27

Statistics	CONN	MASS
First downs	14	21
Total yards	291	407
Rushing yards	163	247
Passing yards	128	160
Turnovers	3	0
Time of possession	20:49	39:11

Team	Category	Player	Statistics
UConn	Passing	Steven Krajewski	13/24, 128 yards, TD, 2 INT
UConn	Rushing	Nate Carter	20 rushes, 136 yards
UConn	Receiving	Keelan Marion	4 receptions, 80 yards, TD
UMass	Passing	Brady Olson	10/22, 162 yards
UMass	Rushing	Ellis Merriweather	39 rushes, 171 yards, 2 TD
UMass	Receiving	Eric Collins	3 receptions, 66 yards

=== At Florida State ===
	1	2	3	4	Total
Minutemen	3	0	0	0	3
Seminoles	10	28	14	7	59

Statistics	MASS	FSU
First downs	14	25
Total yards	241	586
Rushing yards	112	365
Passing yards	129	221
Turnovers	3	1
Time of possession	30:17	29:43

Team	Category	Player	Statistics
UMass	Passing	Brady Olson	12/27, 110 yards, 2 INT
UMass	Rushing	Zamar Wise	12 rushes, 60 yards
UMass	Receiving	Ellis Merriweather	4 receptions, 65 yards
Florida State	Passing	Jordan Travis	5/10, 123 yards
Florida State	Rushing	Jashaun Corbin	11 rushes, 127 yards, TD
Florida State	Receiving	Andrew Parchment	2 receptions, 65 yards

=== At Liberty ===
	1	2	3	4	Total
Minutemen	3	0	7	7	17
Flames	21	20	7	14	62

Statistics	MASS	LIB
First downs	15	26
Total yards	284	604
Rushing yards	210	195
Passing yards	74	409
Turnovers	2	1
Time of possession	36:35	23:25

Team	Category	Player	Statistics
UMass	Passing	Brady Olson	9/25, 74 yards, TD, INT
UMass	Rushing	Ellis Merriweather	24 rushes, 149 yards
UMass	Receiving	Rico Arnold	1 reception, 30 yards, TD
Liberty	Passing	Malik Willis	19/27, 307 yards, 4 TD
Liberty	Rushing	T. J. Green	5 rushes, 60 yards, 2 TD
Liberty	Receiving	D. J. Stubbs	2 receptions, 72 yards, TD

=== Rhode Island ===
	1	2	3	4	Total
Rams	7	14	14	0	35
Minutemen	6	10	0	6	22

Statistics	URI	MASS
First downs	16	21
Total yards	337	335
Rushing yards	168	108
Passing yards	169	227
Turnovers	0	1
Time of possession	30:38	29:22

Team	Category	Player	Statistics
Rhode Island	Passing	Kasim Hill	11/20, 169 yards, 2 TD
Rhode Island	Rushing	Jaylen Smith	16 rushes, 111 yards, TD
Rhode Island	Receiving	Paul Woods	3 receptions, 55 yards
UMass	Passing	Tyler Lytle	15/28, 227 yards, TD, INT
UMass	Rushing	Ellis Merriweather	30 rushes, 118 yards, TD
UMass	Receiving	Rico Arnold	6 receptions, 99 yards

=== Maine ===
	1	2	3	4	Total
Black Bears	0	14	7	14	35
Minutemen	10	0	0	0	10

Statistics	ME	MASS
First downs	18	15
Total yards	366	297
Rushing yards	157	184
Passing yards	209	113
Turnovers	0	0
Time of possession	31:23	28:37

Team	Category	Player	Statistics
Maine	Passing	Joe Fagnano	16/27, 209 yards, 2 TD
Maine	Rushing	Elijah Barnwell	16 rushes, 84 yards, 2 TD
Maine	Receiving	Devin Young	8 receptions, 78 yards, TD
UMass	Passing	Brady Olson	14/29, 113 yards, TD
UMass	Rushing	Ellis Merriweather	27 rushes, 177 yards
UMass	Receiving	Tray Pettway	2 receptions, 48 yards

=== At Army ===
	1	2	3	4	Total
Minutemen	3	7	0	7	17
Black Knights	8	11	0	14	33

Statistics	MASS	ARMY
First downs	12	20
Total yards	277	419
Rushing yards	199	377
Passing yards	78	42
Turnovers	4	1
Time of possession	27:04	32:56

Team	Category	Player	Statistics
UMass	Passing	Garrett Dzuro	7/13, 78 yards, TD, 2 INT
UMass	Rushing	Ellis Merriweather	17 rushes, 110 yards
UMass	Receiving	Tray Pettway	1 reception, 38 yards
Army	Passing	Christian Anderson	2/12, 42 yards
Army	Rushing	Tyrell Robinson	9 rushes, 137 yards, TD
Army	Receiving	Isaiah Alston	2 receptions, 42 yards

=== At New Mexico State ===
	1	2	3	4	Total
Minutemen	0	13	14	0	27
Aggies	7	20	7	10	44

Statistics	MASS	NMSU
First downs	16	30
Total yards	405	623
Rushing yards	281	203
Passing yards	124	420
Turnovers	0	0
Time of possession	27:30	32:30

Team	Category	Player	Statistics
UMass	Passing	Garrett Dzuro	12/23, 124 yards, TD
UMass	Rushing	Ellis Merriweather	23 rushes, 168 yards, 2 TD
UMass	Receiving	Rico Arnold	2 receptions, 77 yards, TD
New Mexico State	Passing	Jonah Johnson	26/32, 420 yards, 2 TD
New Mexico State	Rushing	Juwaun Price	24 rushes, 156 yards, 4 TD
New Mexico State	Receiving	Jared Wyatt	6 receptions, 126 yards, TD

== Notable players ==
RB Ellis Merriweather

QB Brady Olson

WR Rico Arnold
