= 2021 New Mexico State Aggies football team =

American college football season

2021 New Mexico State Aggies football
- Conference: Independent
- Record: 2–10
- Head coach: Doug Martin (9th season)
- Associate head coach: Oliver Soukup (5th season)
- Offensive scheme: Air raid
- Defensive coordinator: Frank Spaziani (6th season)
- Base defense: 3–3–5
- Captains: Alex Escobar; Sage Doxtater; Donavan King; Trevor Brohard
- Home stadium: Aggie Memorial Stadium

2021 NCAA Division I FBS independents football records
	Conf.			Overall
Team	W		L	W		L
No. 8 Notre Dame		–		11	–	2
No. 19 BYU		–		10	–	3
Army		–		9	–	4
Liberty		–		8	–	5
New Mexico State		–		2	–	10
UMass		–		1	–	11
UConn		–		1	–	11
Rankings from AP Poll

The 2021 New Mexico State Aggies football team represented New Mexico State University as an independent during the 2021 NCAA Division I FBS football season. Led by Doug Martin in his ninth and final season as head coach, the Aggies compiled a record of 2–10. New Mexico State played home games at Aggie Memorial Stadium in Las Cruces, New Mexico.

On November 28, the day following the Aggies' season finale, athletic director Mario Moccia announced that Martin's contract would not be renewed. Martin finished his career at New Mexico State with an overall record of 25–74 through nine seasons.

== Schedule ==
Date	Time	Opponent	Site	TV	Result	Attendance
August 28	7:30 p.m.	UTEP	Aggie Memorial Stadium; Las Cruces, NM (Battle of I-10)	AggieVision	L 3–30	19,034
September 4	8:30 p.m.	at San Diego State	Dignity Health Sports Park; Carson, CA	CBSSN	L 10–28	10,116
September 11	5:00 p.m.	at New Mexico	University Stadium; Albuquerque, NM (Rio Grande Rivalry)	Stadium	L 25–34	28,470
September 18	6:00 p.m.	South Carolina State	Aggie Memorial Stadium; Las Cruces, NM	AggieVision	W 43–35	11,823
September 25	6:00 p.m.	Hawaii^{†}	Aggie Memorial Stadium; Las Cruces, NM	AggieVision	L 21–41	13,932
October 2	8:30 p.m.	at San Jose State	CEFCU Stadium; San Jose, CA	NBCSBA	L 31–37	15,803
October 9	8:30 p.m.	at Nevada	Mackay Stadium; Reno, NV	CBSSN	L 28–55	21,448
October 23	10:00 p.m.	at Hawaii	Clarence T. C. Ching Athletics Complex; Honolulu, HI	SPEC HI	L 34–48	1,000
November 6	2:00 p.m.	Utah State	Aggie Memorial Stadium; Las Cruces, NM	AggieVision	L 13–35	7,802
November 13	10:00 a.m.	at No. 2 Alabama	Bryant–Denny Stadium; Tuscaloosa, AL	SECN	L 3–59	97,011
November 20	10:00 a.m.	at Kentucky	Kroger Field; Lexington, KY	SECN	L 16–56	47,749
November 27	1:00 p.m.	UMass	Aggie Memorial Stadium; Las Cruces, NM	AggieVision	W 44–27	6,632
^{†}Homecoming; Rankings from AP Poll and CFP Rankings after November 2 released prior to game; All times are in Mountain time

AggieVision games aired on KVIA-TV, BSAZ, FloFootball, & Comcast.

== Personnel ==
2021 New Mexico State Aggies football team roster
Players
Coaches
Offense

Pos.	#	Name	Class
WR	0	Dominic Gicinto	Jr
WR	1	Jared Wyatt	GS
WR	2	Isaiah Garcia–Castaneda	So
WR	3	Jalyne McFall	Fr
WR	4	Robert Downs III	Sr
RB	5	O'Maury Samuels	Jr
WR	6	Justice Powers	Jr
WR	7	Terrell Warner	Jr
WR	8	Tevis Abraham Jr.	Jr
RB	9	Juwaun Price	Fr
QB	10	Jonah Johnson	Jr
WR	11	Andre Bodison	Sr
WR	12	Javien Clemmer	Fr
WR	13	Ron Vann	Fr
WR	14	Cole Harrity	So
QB	15	Jeff Davison	Fr
RB	16	Larenzo McMillan	Fr
QB	17	Weston Eget	Fr
QB	18	Clay Houghtaling	So
QB	19	Trevor Appelman	Fr
RB	20	Tim Gans	Fr
RB	21	Alex Escobar (C)	So
WR	22	P.J. Johnson III	Fr
QB	23	Dino Maldonado	So
TE	24	Kareem Burgess	Jr
WR	25	Ivan Avina	So
WR	40	Jahre Fish	Sr
OL	54	Isaiah Mursalat	So
OL	55	Garrison Tullos	Sr
OL	61	Eli Johnson	GS
OL	62	Jae'Vone Brown	Fr
OL	63	Stephawn Townsend	Jr
OL	64	Preston Thomazin	So
OL	65	Eddy Lazalde	Fr
OL	67	Jeremiah Marlin	So
OL	68	Isaac Gonzalez	Fr
OL	69	Doro Omerhi	GS
OL	70	David Ash	Jr
OL	71	Shiyazh Pete	Fr
OL	73	Luteru Fedler	Fr
OL	74	Carlos Peoples	Fr
OL	75	Dylan Smith	Fr
OL	76	Sage Doxtater (C)	Sr
OL	77	Carson Pharris	Fr
OL	78	Gabriel Preciado	Jr
OL	79	Matt Cushman	Fr
WR	81	Ethan Singleton	Fr
WR	82	Sol Rascon	Sr
WR	83	Lawrence Dixon	Jr
TE	85	Thomaz Whitford	Jr
WR	86	Braxton McDonald	Fr
TE	87	Grant Oberheu	Fr
TE	88	Jacob Franklin	So
WR	89	Daniel Redmond	Fr
TE	90	Wyatt Campos	So

Defense

Pos.	#	Name	Class
DB	0	B.J. Sculark	So
DB	1	Devlin Kirklin	Jr
DB	2	Chris Bell	Jr
LB	3	Chris Ojoh	Jr
LB	4	Joshua Ferguson	Fr
LB	6	Michael Bowe Jr.	Sr
DB	7	D.J. McCullough	Jr
DB	8	Olan Cazad Jr.	Fr
CB	9	Antonio Oliver	Jr
DL	10	Lazarus Williams	Jr
DB	12	Caleb Mills	Sr
DB	13	Syrus Dumas	So
DB	14	Brandon Shivers	Fr
DB	15	Torren Union	Fr
DB	16	Justin Stinson	Fr
DL	18	Marcus Buckley	Jr
LB, DE	19	Lezeric Bailey	Fr
DB	20	Garret Wojick	Fr
DB	21	Darius Peterson	Fr
DB	22	Xavier Hinkle	Jr
LB	23	Dalton Bowles	So
LB	24	Nick Giacolone	Fr
DL	25	Lama Lavea	Fr
DL	26	Donavan King (C)	Jr
DB	28	Dylan Early	Fr
DB	30	Xzavier Guyton	So
LB	31	Mike Edwards	So
DB	32	Ben Tobin	Fr
LB	36	Dylan Zolezzi	So
DB	37	Johnny Tamayo	Fr
LB	38	Alex Sanchez	Fr
DB	39	Isaac Gallegos	Fr
DB	40	Jahre Fish	Sr
LB	41	Brennon Davis	Sr
LB	43	Taylor Milton	Fr
LB	45	Tyler Roebuck	So
LB	46	James Blowers	Jr
LB	47	Damarcus Ellis–Dennard	Fr
LB	48	Eric Marsh	Jr
LB	49	Dylan Grant	Jr
DL	53	Jake Harrelson	Sr
DL	55	Ivan Escobar	Fr
DL	58	Sioeli Helu	Fr
LB	80	Trevor Brohard (C)	Jr
DL	91	Justin Segura	So
DL	92	Amari Pouncy	Fr
DL	93	Tyriece Thomas	Fr
DL	95	Devin Bell	So
DL	96	Garrett Bishop	Fr
DL	98	Zach Stokes	So
DL	99	Dassani Freeman	Jr
DL		De'Shawn Johnson	Fr
DB		Ronnie Sanders II	Fr
DL		Zach Stokes	So

Special teams

Pos.	#	Name	Class
N/A	5	Jeremiah Dervil	Fr
PK	29	Brett Money	Fr
LS	34	Austin Reeves	Jr
P	35	Josh Carlson	So
LS	44	Logan MacGregor	Fr
PK	84	Ethan Albertson	So
P	97	Carson Zilmer	So

Head coach

- Doug Martin (Kentucky)
  Offensive Coordinator

Coordinators/assistant coaches

- Oliver Soukup (New Mexico State)
  Assistant Head Coach
  Linebackers
- Frank Spaziani (Penn State)
  Defensive Coordinator
- Brian Bell (Bemidji State and Dakota State)
  Defensive Backs
- Matt Christian (Palomar and New Mexico State)
  Running Backs
  Special Teams
  Academic Coordinator
- Chase Holbrook (Southeastern Louisiana and New Mexico State)
  Quarterbacks
- Cory Martin (Kent State)
  Wide Receivers
  Recruiting Coordinator
- Kevin Maurice (UTEP, St. Joseph's – IN and CUC)
  Tight Ends
- John Mumford (Pittsburg State)
  Defensive Line
- Ronnie Pentz (San Diego)
  Special Teams Coordinator
- Cory White (Humboldt State and Whittier)
  Offensive Line

Legend

- (C) Team captain
- (S) Suspended
- (I) Ineligible
- Injured
- Redshirt

Roster
Last update: August 19, 2021

== Game summaries ==
=== UTEP ===
UTEP at New Mexico State
(Battle of I-10)

Team	1	2	3	4	Total
• Miners	17	3	10	0	30
Aggies	0	3	0	0	3

- Date: August 28, 2021
- Location: Aggie Memorial Stadium
  Las Cruces, NM
- Game start: 7:38 p.m. MDT
- Elapsed time: 3 hours and 19 minutes
- Game attendance: 19,034
- Game weather: Temperature: 84 °F (29 °C) • Weather: Sunny • Wind: NE 6 MPH
- Referee: Kevin Brunette
- TV announcers (KVIA-TV/BSAZ/FloSports/Comcast): Adam Young (play–by–play), Danny Knee (analyst) and Stephanie Shields (sideline)

Scoring summary
1	10:37	UTEP	Deion Hankins 5–yard run (Gavin Baechle kick) (5 plays, 80 yards, 2:54)	UTEP 7–0
1	09:09	UTEP	Gavin Baechle 35–yard field goal (4 plays, 7 yards, 1:17)	UTEP 10–0
1	01:49	UTEP	Ronald Awatt 34–yard run (Gavin Baechle kick) (6 plays, 80 yards, 3:16)	UTEP 17–0
2	13:48	NMSU	Ethan Albertson 27–yard field goal (10 plays, 66 yards, 3:01)	UTEP 17–3
2	00:00	UTEP	Gavin Baechle 27–yard field goal (12 plays, 58 yards, 4:50)	UTEP 20–3
3	13:48	UTEP	Jacob Cowing 59–yard pass from Gavin Hardison (Gavin Baechle kick) (3 plays, 75 yards, 1:12)	UTEP 27–3
3	04:02	UTEP	Gavin Baechle 33–yard field goal (10 plays, 65 yards, 5:38)	UTEP 30–3

Statistics	UTEP	New Mexico State
First downs	19	20
Total yards	452	190
Rushing yards	203	101
Passing yards	249	89
Turnovers	0	3
Time of possession	32:29	27:31

Team	Category	Player	Statistics
UTEP	Passing	Gavin Hardison	11/16, 249 yards, 1 TD, 1 INT
UTEP	Rushing	Ronald Awatt	11 carries, 74 yards, 1 TD
UTEP	Receiving	Jacob Cowing	5 receptions, 158 yards, 1 TD
New Mexico State	Passing	Jonah Johnson	8/24, 82 yards
New Mexico State	Rushing	Juwaun Price	9 carries, 37 yards
New Mexico State	Receiving	Dominic Gicinto	2 receptions, 31 yards

=== At San Diego State ===
New Mexico State at San Diego State

Team	1	2	3	4	Total
Aggies	3	7	0	0	10
• Aztecs	0	0	21	7	28

- Date: September 4, 2021
- Location: Dignity Health Sports Park
  Carson, CA
- Game start: 7:32 p.m. PDT
- Elapsed time: 3 hours and 33 minutes
- Game attendance: 10,116
- Game weather: Temperature: 73 °F (23 °C) • Weather: Sunny • Wind: N 5 MPH
- Referee: Stephen Baron
- TV announcers (CBSSN): Rich Waltz (play–by–play), Aaron Taylor (analyst) and Lindsay Rhodes (sideline)

Scoring summary
1	07:26	NMSU	Ethan Albertson 31–yard field goal (10 plays, 75 yards, 4:24)	NMSU 3–0
2	10:42	NMSU	Dominic Gicinto 8–yard pass from Jonah Johnson (Ethan Albertson kick) (12 plays, 90 yards, 4:05)	NMSU 10–0
3	13:43	SDSU	Greg Bell 23–yard run (Matt Araiza kick) (3 plays, 65 yards, 1:17)	NMSU 10–7
3	03:01	SDSU	Jordon Brookshire 18–yard run (Matt Araiza kick) (6 plays, 73 yards, 2:13)	SDSU 14–10
3	02:45	SDSU	Andrew Aleki 25–yard interception	SDSU 21–10
4	14:19	SDSU	Jordan Byrd 43–yard run (Matt Araiza kick) (3 plays, 80 yards, 1:16)	SDSU 28–10

Statistics	New Mexico State	San Diego State
First downs	21	17
Total yards	374	363
Rushing yards	48	248
Passing yards	326	115
Turnovers	4	4
Time of possession	33:42	26:18

Team	Category	Player	Statistics
New Mexico State	Passing	Jonah Johnson	34/56, 326 yards, 1 TD, 3 INTs
New Mexico State	Rushing	O'Maury Samuels	6 carries, 35 yards
New Mexico State	Receiving	Terrell Warner	10 receptions, 79 yards
San Diego State	Passing	Jordon Brookshire	7/20, 115 yards, 1 INT
San Diego State	Rushing	Greg Bell	21 carries, 161 yards, 1 TD
San Diego State	Receiving	Kobe Smith	2 receptions, 63 yards

=== At New Mexico ===
New Mexico State at New Mexico
(Battle of I-25 / Rio Grande Rivalry)

Team	1	2	3	4	Total
Aggies	3	17	2	3	25
• Lobos	14	10	3	7	34

- Date: September 11, 2021
- Location: University Stadium
  Albuquerque, NM
- Game start: 5:06 p.m. MDT
- Elapsed time: 3 hours and 35 minutes
- Game attendance: 28,470
- Game weather: Temperature: 93 °F (34 °C) • Weather: Sunny • Wind: N/A
- Referee: Dan Scanlan
- TV announcers (Stadium): Ari Wolfe (play–by–play) and Mike Lamb (analyst)

Scoring summary
1	14:00	NM	Bobby Cole 4–yard run (Andrew Shelley kick) (3 plays, 64 yards, 0:50)	NM 7–0
1	07:42	NMSU	Ethan Albertson 43–yard field goal (8 plays, 34 yards, 2:27)	NM 7–3
1	05:37	NM	Connor Witthoft 15–yard pass from Terry Wilson Jr. (Andrew Shelley kick) (7 plays, 75 yards, 2:05)	NM 14–3
2	14:20	NMSU	Ethan Albertson 33–yard field goal (7 plays, 54 yards, 1:29)	NM 14–6
2	06:33	NMSU	Thomaz Whitford 11–yard pass from Isaiah Garcia–Castaneda (Ethan Albertson kick) (8 plays, 68 yards, 2:45)	NM 14–13
2	02:07	NM	Andrew Erickson 17–yard pass from Terry Wilson Jr. (Andrew Shelley kick) (5 plays, 48 yards, 1:57)	NM 21–13
2	01:57	NMSU	Isaiah Garcia–Castaneda 75–yard pass from Dino Maldonado (Ethan Albertson kick) (1 play, 75 yards, 0:10)	NM 21–20
2	00:53	NM	Andrew Shelley 45–yard field goal (5 plays, 21 yards, 0:57)	NM 24–20
3	12:10	NMSU	Team 0–yard safety	NM 24–22
3	00:36	NM	Andrew Shelley 24–yard field goal (4 plays, 1 yard, 0:52)	NM 27–22
4	12:32	NMSU	Ethan Albertson 37–yard field goal (10 plays, 56 yards, 3:04)	NM 27–25
4	12:01	NM	Emmanuel Logan–Greene 58–yard pass from Terry Wilson Jr. (Andrew Shelley kick) (2 plays, 75 yards, 0:31)	NM 34–25

Statistics	New Mexico State	New Mexico
First downs	19	29
Total yards	345	559
Rushing yards	109	178
Passing yards	236	381
Turnovers	0	3
Time of possession	23:32	36:28

Team	Category	Player	Statistics
New Mexico State	Passing	Dino Maldonado	13/34, 192 yards, 1 TD, 2 INTs
New Mexico State	Rushing	Dino Maldonado	6 carries, 46 yards
New Mexico State	Receiving	Isaiah Garcia–Castaneda	3 receptions, 98 yards, 1 TD
New Mexico	Passing	Terry Wilson Jr.	26/37, 381 yards, 3 TDs
New Mexico	Rushing	Bobby Cole	20 carries, 107 yards, 1 TD
New Mexico	Receiving	Emmanuel Logan–Greene	7 receptions, 106 yards, 1 TD

=== South Carolina State ===
South Carolina State at New Mexico State

Team	1	2	3	4	Total
Trailblazers	0	13	7	15	35
• Aggies	14	21	7	0	42

- Date: September 18, 2021
- Location: Aggie Memorial Stadium
  Las Cruces, NM
- Game start: 6:08 p.m. MDT
- Elapsed time: 3 hours and 16 minutes
- Game attendance: 11,823
- Game weather: Temperature: 95 °F (35 °C) • Weather: Sunny • Wind: SE 7 MPH
- Referee: Christian Watson
- TV announcers (KVIA-TV/FloSports/Comcast): Adam Young (play–by–play), Danny Knee (analyst) and Megan McCormick (sideline)

Scoring summary
1	10:36	NMSU	Juwaun Price 14–yard run (Ethan Albertson kick) (9 plays, 81 yards, 4:20)	NMSU 7–0
1	03:43	NMSU	O'Maury Samuels 3–yard run (Thomaz Whitford rush) (11 plays, 85 yards, 5:21)	NMSU 15–0
2	12:02	NMSU	Juwaun Price 8–yard run (Ethan Albertson kick) (7 plays, 80 yards, 2:51)	NMSU 22–0
2	07:31	SCSU	Kendrell Flowers 15–yard run (Dyson Roberts kick failed) (9 plays, 75 yards, 4:31)	NMSU 22–6
2	04:47	NMSU	Jared Wyatt 30–yard pass from Dino Maldonado (Ethan Albertson kick) (8 plays, 75 yards, 2:44)	NMSU 29–6
2	02:00	SCSU	Richard Bailey 37–yard pass from Corey Fields Jr. (Dyson Roberts kick) (7 plays, 75 yards, 2:47)	NMSU 29–13
2	01:43	NMSU	Isaiah Garcia–Castaneda 41–yard pass from Dino Maldonado (Ethan Albertson kick) (1 play, 41 yards, 0:09)	NMSU 36–13
3	11:42	NMSU	Eric Marsh 1–yard pass from Dino Maldonado (Ethan Albertson kick) (6 plays, 14 yards, 2:52)	NMSU 43–13
3	04:07	SCSU	Hezekiah Massey 6–yard pass from Corey Fields Jr. (Dyson Roberts kick) (12 plays, 75 yards, 7:35)	NMSU 43–20
4	10:49	SCSU	Will Vereen 18–yard pass from Corey Fields Jr. (Dyson Roberts kick) (7 plays, 63 yards, 3:32)	NMSU 43–27
4	01:35	SCSU	Kendrell Flowers 20–yard pass from Corey Fields Jr. (Yancy Washington pass) (8 plays, 70 yards, 2:48)	NMSU 43–35

Statistics	South Carolina State	New Mexico State
First downs	24	24
Total yards	428	427
Rushing yards	76	106
Passing yards	352	321
Turnovers	0	1
Time of possession	31:46	28:14

Team	Category	Player	Statistics
South Carolina State	Passing	Corey Fields Jr.	30/47, 352 yards, 4 TDs, 3 INTs
South Carolina State	Rushing	Kendrell Flowers	13 carries, 58 yards, 1 TD
South Carolina State	Receiving	Will Vereen	9 receptions, 118 yards, 1 TD
New Mexico State	Passing	Dino Maldonado	24/32, 321 yards, 3 TDs
New Mexico State	Rushing	Juwaun Price	13 carries, 62 yards, 2 TDs
New Mexico State	Receiving	Isaiah Garcia–Castaneda	3 receptions, 78 yards, 1 TD

=== Hawaii ===
Hawaii at New Mexico State

Team	1	2	3	4	Total
• Rainbow Warriors	10	7	7	17	41
Aggies	3	10	0	8	21

- Date: September 25, 2021
- Location: Aggie Memorial Stadium
  Las Cruces, NM
- Game start: 6:07 p.m. MDT
- Elapsed time: 3 hours and 19 minutes
- Game attendance: 13,932
- Game weather: Temperature: 72 °F (22 °C) • Weather: Cloudy • Wind: N 15 MPH
- Referee: Derek Anderson
- TV announcers (KVIA-TV/FloSports/Comcast): Adam Young (play–by–play), Danny Knee (analyst) and Megan McCormick (sideline)

Scoring summary
1	09:33	NMSU	Ethan Albertson 33–yard field goal (12 plays, 60 yards, 5:27)	NMSU 3–0
1	09:19	UH	Nick Mardner 74–yard pass from Chevan Cordeiro (Matthew Shipley kick) (1 play, 74 yards, 0:10)	UH 7–3
1	03:26	UH	Matthew Shipley 25–yard field goal (9 plays, 54 yards, 4:25)	UH 10–3
2	13:31	UH	Cameron Lockridge 5–yard fumble recovery (Matthew Shipley kick)	UH 17–3
2	11:27	NMSU	Robert Downs III 6–yard pass from Jonah Johnson (Ethan Albertson kick) (5 plays, 71 yards, 2:04)	UH 17–10
2	07:58	NMSU	Ethan Albertson 20–yard field goal (6 plays, 36 yards, 2:21)	UH 17–13
3	02:24	UH	Chevan Cordeiro 1–yard run (Matthew Shipley kick) (7 plays, 38 yards, 2:38)	UH 24–13
4	14:11	UH	Calvin Turner Jr. 14–yard run (Matthew Shipley kick) (3 plays, 50 yards, 1:23)	UH 31–13
4	10:20	NMSU	Jonah Johnson 3–yard run (Isiah Garcia–Castaneda rush) (10 plays, 85 yards, 3:46)	UH 31–21
4	06:52	UH	Matthew Shipley 41–yard field goal (8 plays, 51 yards, 3:28)	UH 34–21
4	01:52	UH	Dedrick Parson 19–yard run (Matthew Shipley kick) (4 plays, 35 yards, 1:02)	UH 41–21

Statistics	Hawaii	New Mexico State
First downs	21	22
Total yards	492	401
Rushing yards	215	121
Passing yards	277	280
Turnovers	3	4
Time of possession	22:49	37:11

Team	Category	Player	Statistics
Hawaii	Passing	Chevan Cordeiro	16/25, 277 yards, 1 TD, 1 INT
Hawaii	Rushing	Dedrick Parson	11 carries, 89 yards, 1 TD
Hawaii	Receiving	Nick Mardner	4 receptions, 120 yards, 1 TD
New Mexico State	Passing	Jonah Johnson	28/47, 280 yards, 1 TD, 1 INT
New Mexico State	Rushing	Juwaun Price	9 carries, 72 yards
New Mexico State	Receiving	Jared Wyatt	9 receptions, 114 yards

=== At San Jose State ===
New Mexico State at San Jose State

Team	1	2	3	4	Total
Aggies	0	14	7	10	31
• Spartans	7	17	6	7	37

- Date: October 2, 2021
- Location: CEFCU Stadium
  San Jose, CA
- Game start: 7:36 p.m. PDT
- Elapsed time: 3 hours and 10 minutes
- Game attendance: 15,803
- Game weather: Temperature: 80 °F (27 °C) • Weather: Sunny • Wind: SE 6 MPH
- Referee: Scott Campbell
- TV announcers (NBCSBA): Justin Allegri (play–by–play) and David Fales (analyst)

Scoring summary
1	01:11	SJSU	Tyler Nevens 3–yard run (Matt Mercurio kick) (11 plays, 76 yards, 6:37)	SJSU 7–0
2	12:28	NMSU	Isaiah Garcia–Castaneda 5–yard pass from Jonah Johnson (Ethan Albertson kick) (7 plays, 75 yards, 3:43)	TIE 7–7
2	10:08	SJSU	Malikhi Miller 25–yard pass from Nick Nash (Matt Mercurio kick) (4 plays, 65 yards, 2:11)	SJSU 14–7
2	04:33	NMSU	Cole Harrity 8–yard pass from Jonah Johnson (Ethan Albertson kick) (11 plays, 70 yards, 5:28)	TIE 14–14
2	01:09	SJSU	Matt Mercurio 35–yard field goal (5 plays, 43 yards, 3:24)	SJSU 17–14
2	00:54	SJSU	Derrick Deese Jr. 12–yard pass from Nick Nash (Matt Mercurio kick) (1 play, 12 yards, 0:05)	SJSU 24–14
3	06:23	NMSU	Juwaun Price 2–yard run (Ethan Albertson kick) (3 plays, 25 yards, 1:05)	SJSU 24–21
3	02:18	SJSU	Shamar Garrett 7–yard run (Matt Mercurio kick blocked) (6 plays, 85 yards, 3:58)	SJSU 30–21
4	11:51	NMSU	Isaiah Garcia–Castaneda 5–yard pass from Jonah Johnson (Ethan Albertson kick) (13 plays, 80 yards, 5:24)	SJSU 30–28
4	05:49	SJSU	Kairee Robinson 1–yard pass from Nick Nash (Matt Mercurio kick) (10 plays, 81 yards, 6:02)	SJSU 37–28
4	01:48	NMSU	Ethan Albertson 25–yard field goal (11 plays, 68 yards, 4:01)	SJSU 37–31

Statistics	New Mexico State	San Jose State
First downs	23	18
Total yards	386	402
Rushing yards	86	209
Passing yards	300	193
Turnovers	0	3
Time of possession	29:31	30:29

Team	Category	Player	Statistics
New Mexico State	Passing	Jonah Johnson	30/44, 300 yards, 3 TDs, 1 INT
New Mexico State	Rushing	O'Maury Samuels	11 carries, 57 yards
New Mexico State	Receiving	Isaiah Garcia–Castaneda	6 receptions, 90 yards, 2 TDs
San Jose State	Passing	Nick Nash	15/18, 193 yards, 3 TDs
San Jose State	Rushing	Tyler Nevens	22 carries, 115 yards, 1 TD
San Jose State	Receiving	Derrick Deese Jr.	7 receptions, 130 yards, 1 TD

=== At Nevada ===
New Mexico State at Nevada

Team	1	2	3	4	Total
Aggies	7	0	0	21	28
• Wolf Pack	3	28	21	2	54

- Date: October 9, 2021
- Location: Mackay Stadium
  Reno, NV
- Game start: 7:30 p.m. PDT
- Game attendance: 21,448
- TV announcers (CBSSN): Jason Knapp (play–by–play), Ross Tucker (analyst) and Desmond Purnell (sideline)

Statistics	New Mexico State	Nevada
First downs	25	27
Total yards	452	532
Rushing yards	27	69
Passing yards	425	463
Turnovers	1	1
Time of possession	32:21	27:39

Team	Category	Player	Statistics
New Mexico State	Passing	Jonah Johnson	38/62, 425 yards, 3 TD
New Mexico State	Rushing	Juwaun Price	10 rushes, 37 yards
New Mexico State	Receiving	Isaiah Garcia-Castaneda	5 receptions, 76 yards
Nevada	Passing	Carson Strong	25/32, 377 yards, 6 TD, INT
Nevada	Rushing	Toa Taua	7 rushes, 28 yards
Nevada	Receiving	Melquan Stovall	7 receptions, 155 yards, TD

=== At Hawaii ===
New Mexico State at Hawaii

Team	1	2	3	4	Total
Aggies	3	10	14	7	34
• Rainbow Warriors	10	14	10	14	48

- Date: October 23, 2021
- Location: Clarence T. C. Ching Athletics Complex
  Honolulu, HI
- Game start: 10:07 p.m. MDT
- Elapsed time: 3 hours and 8 minutes
- Game attendance: 1,000
- Game weather: Temperature: 81 °F (27 °C) • Weather: Humidity - 54% • Wind: NE @ 8 mph
- Referee: Timothy Davis
- Television network: SPEC HI

Statistics	New Mexico State	Hawaii
First downs	28	25
Total yards	485	482
Rushing yards	257	263
Passing yards	228	219
Turnovers	2	2
Time of possession	32:30	27:30

Team	Category	Player	Statistics
New Mexico State	Passing	Jonah Johnson	24/54, 228 yards, 2 INT
New Mexico State	Rushing	Juwaun Price	17 carries, 159 yards, 2 TD
New Mexico State	Receiving	Castaned Garcia	6 receptions, 82 yards
Hawaii	Passing	Brayden Schager	25/29, 219 yards
Hawaii	Rushing	Dedrick Parson	25 carries, 161 yards, 3 TD
Hawaii	Receiving	Nick Mardner	4 receptions, 81 yards

=== Utah State ===
Utah State at New Mexico State

Team	1	2	3	4	Total
• USU Aggies	0	7	21	7	35
NMSU Aggies	10	3	0	0	13

- Date: November 6, 2021
- Location: Aggie Memorial Stadium
  Las Cruces, NM
- Game start: 2:07 p.m. MDT
- Elapsed time: 3 hours and 15 minutes
- Game attendance: 7,802
- Game weather: Temperature: 76 °F (24 °C) • Weather: Sunny • Wind: SE 2 mph
- Referee: Derek Anderson
- Television network: KVIA-TV/FloSports/Comcast

Statistics	Utah State	New Mexico State
First downs	23	28
Total yards	457	347
Rushing yards	98	49
Passing yards	359	298
Turnovers	1	0
Time of possession	26:20	33:40

Team	Category	Player	Statistics
Utah State	Passing	Logan Bonner	23/32, 359 yards, 4 TD, INT
Utah State	Rushing	Elelyon Noa	16 carries, 57 yards, TD
Utah State	Receiving	Deven Thompkins	9 receptions, 215 yards, 2 TD
New Mexico State	Passing	Jonah Johnson	30/44, 298 yards
New Mexico State	Rushing	Juwaun Price	9 carries, 36 yards, TD
New Mexico State	Receiving	Cole Harrity	9 receptions, 83 yards

=== At No. 2 Alabama ===
New Mexico State at Alabama

Team	1	2	3	4	Total
Aggies	3	0	0	0	3
• No. 2 Crimson Tide	14	35	0	10	59

- Date: November 13, 2021
- Location: Bryant–Denny Stadium
  Tuscaloosa, AL
- Game start: 11:03 a.m. CST
- Game attendance: 97,011
- Game weather: Temperature: 48 °F (9 °C) • Weather: Sunny • Wind: N @ 10 mph
- Referee: Marc Curles
- TV announcers (SEC Network): Taylor Zarzour (play-by-play), Matt Stinchcomb (color), Alyssa Lang (sideline)

Statistics	New Mexico State	Alabama
First downs	10	30
Total yards	138	587
Rushing yards	9	247
Passing yards	129	340
Turnovers	1	1
Time of possession	29:27	30:33

Team	Category	Player	Statistics
New Mexico State	Passing	Jonah Johnson	19/30, 129 yards
New Mexico State	Rushing	Jonah Johnson	14 carries, 5 yards
New Mexico State	Receiving	Cole Harrity	3 receptions, 30 yards
Alabama	Passing	Bryce Young	21/23, 270 yards, 5 TD’s
Alabama	Rushing	Brian Robinson Jr.	9 carries, 99 yards, 2 TD’s
Alabama	Receiving	Jameson Williams	6 receptions, 158 yards, 3 TD’s

=== At Kentucky ===
New Mexico State at Kentucky

Team	1	2	3	4	Total
Aggies	7	9	0	0	16
• Wildcats	21	14	14	7	56

- Date: November 20, 2021
- Location: Kroger Field
  Lexington, KY
- Game start: 12:03 p.m. EST
- Game attendance: 47,749
- Game weather: Temperature: 52 °F (11 °C) • Weather: Sunny • Wind: SW @ 9 mph
- Referee: Alex Moore
- TV announcers (SECN): Taylor Zarzour (play-by-play), Matt Stinchcomb (color), Tera Talmadge (sideline)

Statistics	New Mexico State	Kentucky
First downs	13	29
Total yards	282	707
Rushing yards	101	248
Passing yards	181	459
Turnovers	2	4
Time of possession	26:07	33:53

Team	Category	Player	Statistics
New Mexico State	Passing	Jonah Johnson	16/35, 181 yards, 1 INT
New Mexico State	Rushing	Juwaun Price	11 carries, 51 yards
New Mexico State	Receiving	Justice Powers	1 reception, 41 yards
Kentucky	Passing	Will Levis	21/31, 419 yards, 4 TD’s, 1 INT
Kentucky	Rushing	Chris Rodriguez Jr.	16 carries, 119 yards, 1 TD
Kentucky	Receiving	Wan'Dale Robinson	8 receptions, 181 yards

=== UMass ===
UMass at New Mexico State

Team	1	2	3	4	Total
Minutemen	0	13	14	0	27
• Aggies	7	20	7	10	44

- Date: November 27, 2021
- Location: Aggie Memorial Stadium
  Las Cruces, NM
- Game start: 1:08 p.m. MST
- Elapsed time: 3 hours and 8 minutes
- Game attendance: 6,632
- Game weather: Temperature: 60 °F (16 °C) • Weather: Sunny • Wind: SW 5 mph
- Referee: Derek Anderson
- Television network: KVIA-TV/FloSports/Comcast

Statistics	UMass	New Mexico State
First downs	16	30
Total yards	405	623
Rushing yards	281	203
Passing yards	124	420
Turnovers	0	0
Time of possession	27:30	32:30

Team	Category	Player	Statistics
UMass	Passing	Garrett Dzuro	12/23, 124 yards, TD
UMass	Rushing	Ellis Merriweather	23 carries, 168 yards, 2 TD
UMass	Receiving	Rico Arnold	2 receptions, 77 yards, TD
New Mexico State	Passing	Jonah Johnson	26/32, 420 yards, 2 TD
New Mexico State	Rushing	Juwaun Price	24 carries, 156 yards, 4 TD
New Mexico State	Receiving	Jared Wyatt	6 receptions, 126 yards, TD
