= 2021 Florida State Seminoles football team =

American college football season

2021 Florida State Seminoles football
- Conference: Atlantic Coast Conference
- Atlantic Division
- Record: 5–7 (4–4 ACC)
- Head coach: Mike Norvell (2nd season)
- Offensive coordinator: Kenny Dillingham (2nd season)
- Offensive scheme: Spread
- Defensive coordinator: Adam Fuller (2nd season)
- Base defense: 4–3
- Captain: Game captains
- Home stadium: Doak Campbell Stadium

2021 Atlantic Coast Conference football standings
	Conf.			Overall
Team	W		L	W		L
Atlantic Division
No. 15 Wake Forest xy	7	–	1	11	–	3
No. 20 NC State	6	–	2	9	–	3
No. 14 Clemson	6	–	2	10	–	3
Louisville	4	–	4	6	–	7
Florida State	4	–	4	5	–	7
Boston College	2	–	6	6	–	6
Syracuse	2	–	6	5	–	7
Coastal Division
No. 13 Pittsburgh xy$	7	–	1	11	–	3
Miami (FL)	5	–	3	7	–	5
Virginia Tech	4	–	4	6	–	7
Virginia	4	–	4	6	–	6
North Carolina	3	–	5	6	–	7
Georgia Tech	2	–	6	3	–	9
Duke	0	–	8	3	–	9
Championship: Pittsburgh 45, Wake Forest 21
$ – Conference champion; x – Division champion/co-champions; y – Championship game participant; Rankings from AP Poll

The 2021 Florida State Seminoles football team represented Florida State University during the 2021 NCAA Division I FBS football season. The Seminoles played their home games at Doak Campbell Stadium in Tallahassee, Florida, and competed as members of the Atlantic Coast Conference. They were led by head coach Mike Norvell, in his second season.

== Schedule ==
Date	Time	Opponent	Site	TV	Result	Attendance
September 5	7:30 p.m.	No. 9 Notre Dame*	Doak Campbell Stadium; Tallahassee, FL (rivalry)	ABC	L 38–41 ^{OT}	68,316
September 11	8:00 p.m.	No. 16 (FCS) Jacksonville State*	Doak Campbell Stadium; Tallahassee, FL	ACCN	L 17–20	60,198
September 18	3:30 p.m.	at Wake Forest	Truist Field at Wake Forest; Winston-Salem, NC	ESPN	L 14–35	29,564
September 25	3:30 p.m.	Louisville	Doak Campbell Stadium; Tallahassee, FL	ESPN2	L 23–31	50,964
October 2	3:30 p.m.	Syracuse	Doak Campbell Stadium; Tallahassee, FL	ACCN	W 33–30	56,609
October 9	3:30 p.m.	at North Carolina	Kenan Memorial Stadium; Chapel Hill, NC	ESPN	W 35–25	44,805
October 23	12:00 p.m.	UMass*^{†}	Doak Campbell Stadium; Tallahassee, FL	ACCN	W 59–3	51,915
October 30	3:30 p.m.	at Clemson	Memorial Stadium; Clemson, SC (rivalry)	ESPN	L 20–30	79,097
November 6	4:00 p.m.	No. 19 NC State	Doak Campbell Stadium; Tallahassee, FL	ACCN	L 14–28	50,835
November 13	3:30 p.m.	Miami (FL)	Doak Campbell Stadium; Tallahassee, FL (rivalry)	ESPN	W 31–28	71,917
November 20	12:00 p.m.	at Boston College	Alumni Stadium; Chestnut Hill, MA	ACCN	W 26–23	33,363
November 27	12:00 p.m.	at Florida*	Ben Hill Griffin Stadium; Gainesville, FL (rivalry)	ESPN	L 21–24	88,491
*Non-conference game; ^{†}Homecoming; Rankings from AP Poll released prior to the game; All times are in Eastern time

== Game summaries ==
=== vs Notre Dame ===
	1	2	3	4	OT	Total
No. 9 Notre Dame	7	10	21	0	3	41
Florida State	7	7	6	18	0	38

Statistics	ND	FSU
First downs	17	19
Total yards	431	442
Rushing yards	65	264
Passing yards	208	169
Turnovers	3	2
Time of possession	25:03	29:25

Team	Category	Player	Statistics
Notre Dame	Passing	Jack Coan	26/35, 366 yards, 4 TD, 1 Int
Notre Dame	Rushing	Kyren Williams	18 carries, 42 yards
Notre Dame	Receiving	Michael Mayer	9 receptions, 120 yards, 1 TD
Florida State	Passing	Jordan Travis	9/19, 130 yards, 2 TD, 3 Int
Florida State	Rushing	Jashaun Corbin	15 carries, 144 yards, 1 TD
Florida State	Receiving	Keyshawn Helton	4 receptions, 53 yards

=== Jacksonville State ===
	1	2	3	4	Total
No. 16 (FCS) Jacksonville State	0	7	0	13	20
Florida State	0	14	3	0	17

Statistics	JSU	FSU
First downs	21	21
Total yards	350	335
Rushing yards	108	202
Passing yards	242	133
Turnovers	1	1
Time of possession	32:37	27:14

Team	Category	Player	Statistics
Jacksonville State	Passing	Zerrick Cooper	17/38, 242 yards, 2 TD
Jacksonville State	Rushing	Josh Samuel	8 carries, 33 yards, 1 TD
Jacksonville State	Receiving	Damond Philyaw-Johnson	1 reception, 59 yards, 1 TD
Florida State	Passing	McKenzie Milton	18/31, 133 yards, 1 TD, 1 Int
Florida State	Rushing	Jashaun Corbin	15 carries, 109 yards, 1 TD
Florida State	Receiving	Wyatt Rector	2 receptions, 13 yards, 1 TD

=== At Wake Forest ===
	1	2	3	4	Total
Florida State	7	7	0	0	14
Wake Forest	14	13	8	0	35

Statistics	FSU	WF
First downs	16	27
Total yards	317	484
Rushing yards	91	225
Passing yards	226	259
Turnovers	6	2
Time of possession	20:47	39:13

Team	Category	Player	Statistics
Florida State	Passing	Jordan Travis	5/6, 107 yards, 2 TD, 1 Int
Florida State	Rushing	Treshaun Ward	6 carries, 48 yards
Florida State	Receiving	Ontaria Wilson	3 receptions, 91 yards, 1 TD
Wake Forest	Passing	Sam Hartman	22/31, 259 yards, 2 TD, 1 Int
Wake Forest	Rushing	Christian Beal-Smith	19 carries, 95 yards, 1 TD
Wake Forest	Receiving	A. T. Perry	7 receptions, 155 yards, 1 TD

=== Louisville ===
	1	2	3	4	Total
Louisville	17	14	0	0	31
Florida State	0	13	7	3	23

Statistics	UL	FSU
First downs	21	23
Total yards	395	453
Rushing yards	131	205
Passing yards	264	248
Turnovers	0	1
Time of possession	33:01	26:59

Team	Category	Player	Statistics
Louisville	Passing	Malik Cunningham	25/39, 264 yards, 2 TD
Louisville	Rushing	Malik Cunningham	14 carries, 56 yards, 2 TD
Louisville	Receiving	Tyler Harrell	2 receptions, 63 yards, 1 TD
Florida State	Passing	McKenzie Milton	24/39, 248 yards, 1 TD, 1 Int
Florida State	Rushing	Jashaun Corbin	11 carries, 159 yards, 1 TD
Florida State	Receiving	Andrew Parchment	5 receptions, 86 yards, 1 TD

=== Syracuse ===
	1	2	3	4	Total
Syracuse	0	13	7	10	30
Florida State	3	13	7	10	33

Statistics	SU	FSU
First downs	18	22
Total yards	389	378
Rushing yards	239	247
Passing yards	150	131
Turnovers	1	2
Time of possession	29:44	30:16

Team	Category	Player	Statistics
Syracuse	Passing	Garrett Shrader	13/23, 150 yards, 1 TD, 1 Int
Syracuse	Rushing	Garrett Shrader	16 carries, 137 yards, 3 TD
Syracuse	Receiving	Courtney Jackson	6 receptions, 57 yards
Florida State	Passing	Jordan Travis	22/32, 131 yards, 2 TD, 1 Int
Florida State	Rushing	Jordan Travis	19 carries, 113 yards
Florida State	Receiving	Camren McDonald	5 receptions, 41 yards, 1 TD

=== At North Carolina ===
	1	2	3	4	Total
Florida State	0	21	14	0	35
North Carolina	10	0	7	8	25

Statistics	FSU	UNC
First downs	22	27
Total yards	383	432
Rushing yards	238	229
Passing yards	145	203
Turnovers	0	1
Time of possession	29:48	30:12

Team	Category	Player	Statistics
Florida State	Passing	Jordan Travis	11/13, 145 yards, 3 TD
Florida State	Rushing	Jordan Travis	14 carries, 121 yards, 2 TD
Florida State	Receiving	Keyshawn Helton	3 receptions, 71 yards
North Carolina	Passing	Sam Howell	17/32, 203 yards, 2 TD, 1 Int
North Carolina	Rushing	Sam Howell	11 carries, 108 yards
North Carolina	Receiving	Josh Downs	9 receptions, 121 yards, 1 TD

=== UMass ===
	1	2	3	4	Total
UMass	3	0	0	0	3
Florida State	10	28	14	7	59

Statistics	UMass	FSU
First downs	14	25
Total yards	241	586
Rushing yards	112	365
Passing yards	129	221
Turnovers	3	1
Time of possession	30:17	29:43

Team	Category	Player	Statistics
UMass	Passing	Brady Olson	12/27, 110 yards, 2 Int
UMass	Rushing	Zamar Wise	12 carries, 60 yards
UMass	Receiving	Ellis Merriweather	4 receptions, 65 yards
Florida State	Passing	Jordan Travis	5/10, 123 yards
Florida State	Rushing	Jashaun Corbin	11 carries, 127 yards, 1 TD
Florida State	Receiving	Andrew Parchment	2 receptions, 65 yards

=== At Clemson ===
	1	2	3	4	Total
Florida State	6	7	0	7	20
Clemson	3	14	0	13	30

Statistics	FSU	CU
First downs	12	22
Total yards	241	377
Rushing yards	65	188
Passing yards	176	189
Turnovers	2	3
Time of possession	28:55	31:05

Team	Category	Player	Statistics
Florida State	Passing	Jordan Travis	14/22, 176 yards, 2 TD
Florida State	Rushing	Jashaun Corbin	9 carries, 31 yards
Florida State	Receiving	Lawrance Toafili	1 reception, 68 yards, 1 TD
Clemson	Passing	DJ Uiagalelei	19/31, 189 yards, 1 TD, 1 Int
Clemson	Rushing	Will Shipley	25 carries, 128 yards, 2 TD
Clemson	Receiving	Justyn Ross	6 receptions, 85 yards

=== NC State ===
	1	2	3	4	Total
No. 19 NC State	7	7	7	7	28
Florida State	0	0	14	0	14

Statistics	NCSU	FSU
First downs	16	18
Total yards	400	271
Rushing yards	86	38
Passing yards	314	233
Turnovers	1	1
Time of possession	34:10	25:50

Team	Category	Player	Statistics
NC State	Passing	Devin Leary	21/32, 314 yards, 4 TD, 1 Int
NC State	Rushing	Zonovan Knight	18 carries, 75 yards
NC State	Receiving	Trent Pennix	3 receptions, 97 yards, 1 TD
Florida State	Passing	McKenzie Milton	22/44, 233 yards, 1 TD, 1 Int
Florida State	Rushing	Jashaun Corbin	14 carries, 33 yards, 1 TD
Florida State	Receiving	Keyshawn Helton	4 receptions, 49 yards, 1 TD

=== Miami (FL) ===
	1	2	3	4	Total
Miami	0	7	7	14	28
Florida State	14	6	0	11	31

Statistics	UM	FSU
First downs	20	24
Total yards	359	434
Rushing yards	43	160
Passing yards	316	274
Turnovers	3	1
Time of possession	23:51	36:09

Team	Category	Player	Statistics
Miami	Passing	Tyler Van Dyke	25/47, 316 yards, 4 TD, 2 Int
Miami	Rushing	Jaylan Knighton	16 carries, 32 yards
Miami	Receiving	Charleston Rambo	6 receptions, 95 yards
Florida State	Passing	Jordan Travis	18/26, 274 yards
Florida State	Rushing	Jashaun Corbin	15 carries, 68 yards, 1 TD
Florida State	Receiving	Ja’Khi Douglas	4 receptions, 90 yards

=== At Boston College ===
	1	2	3	4	Total
Florida State	7	12	7	0	26
Boston College	0	3	7	13	23

Statistics	FSU	BC
First downs	21	19
Total yards	365	318
Rushing yards	114	170
Passing yards	251	148
Turnovers	0	1
Time of possession	27:58	32:02

Team	Category	Player	Statistics
Florida State	Passing	Jordan Travis	20/34, 251 yards, 3 TD
Florida State	Rushing	Jashaun Corbin	13 carries, 62 yards
Florida State	Receiving	Ontaria Wilson	3 receptions, 60 yards, 1 TD
Boston College	Passing	Phil Jurkovec	10/24, 148 yards, 1 TD, 1 Int
Boston College	Rushing	Pat Garwo, III	24 carries, 71 yards, 1 TD
Boston College	Receiving	Zay Flowers	3 receptions, 92 yards, 1 TD

=== At Florida ===
	1	2	3	4	Total
Florida State	0	7	0	14	21
Florida	7	0	10	7	24

Statistics	FSU	UF
First downs	23	23
Total yards	348	357
Rushing yards	145	139
Passing yards	203	218
Turnovers	3	3
Time of possession	27:02	32:58

Team	Category	Player	Statistics
Florida State	Passing	Jordan Travis	18/29, 202 yards, 1 TD, 1 Int
Florida State	Rushing	Jordan Travis	17 carries, 102 yards, 1 TD
Florida State	Receiving	Andrew Parchment	5 receptions, 53 yards
Florida	Passing	Emory Jones	16/24, 163 yards, 1 TD, 3 Int
Florida	Rushing	Dameon Pierce	12 carries, 62 yards, 1 TD
Florida	Receiving	Kemore Gamble	3 receptions, 80 yards, 1 TD

== Rankings ==
Ranking movements Legend: ██ Increase in ranking ██ Decrease in ranking — = Not ranked RV = Received votes
	Week															
Poll	Pre	1	2	3	4	5	6	7	8	9	10	11	12	13	14	Final
AP	—	RV	—	—	—	—	—	—	—	—	—	—	—	—	—	—
Coaches	RV	RV	—	—	—	—	—	—	—	—	—	—	—	—	—	—
CFP	Not released									—	—	—	—	—	—	Not released

== Coaching staff ==
Florida State Seminoles coaches

Head coach

- Mike Norvell

Assistant coaches

- Kenny Dillingham – Offensive coordinator/quarterbacks
- Adam Fuller – Defensive coordinator
- John Papuchis – Special teams/defensive ends
- Chris Thomsen – Deputy head coach/tight ends
- Odell Haggins – Associate head coach/defensive tackles
- Alex Atkins – Offensive line
- Ron Dugans – Wide receivers
- David johnson – Running backs/recruiting coordinator
- Chris Marve – Linebackers/defensive run game coordinator
- Marcus Woodson – Defensive backs/defensive passing game coordinator
- Josh storms – Strength and conditioning
- Randy Shannon – Senior defensive analyst

== Honors ==
Awards
Player	Award	Ref.
Jermaine Johnson II	ACC Defensive Back of the Week (Week One); ACC Defensive Lineman of the Week (Week Six); ACC Co-defensive Lineman of the Week (Week Nine); ACC Defensive Lineman of the Week (Week Eleven); All-ACC First Team; ACC Defensive Player of the Year; ESPN First Team All-American; CBS Sports First Team All-American; The Athletic Second Team All-American; Walter Camp Football Foundation First Team All-American; FWAA Second Team All-American; Associated Press Second Team All-American; AFCA Second Team All-American; Lombardi Award semifinalist Bednarik Award semifinalist Ted Hendricks Award finalist	
Dillan Gibbons	ACC Offensive Lineman of the Week (Week Six); All-ACC Honorable Mention	
Malik McClain	ACC Rookie of the Week (Week Six)	
Keir Thomas	ACC Defensive Lineman of the Week (Week Ten); All-ACC Third Team	
Omarion Cooper	ACC Defensive Back of the Week (Week Eleven); ACC Co-Rookie of the Week (Week Eleven)	
Jammie Robinson	ACC Defensive Back of the Week (Week Thirteen); All-ACC First Team	
McKenzie Milton	Brian Piccolo Award; Mayo Clinic Comeback Player of the Year	
Jashaun Corbin	All-ACC Third Team	
Devontay Love-Taylor	All-ACC Honorable Mention	
Robert Cooper	All-ACC Honorable Mention	
Fabien Lovett	All-ACC Honorable Mention	

== Players drafted into the NFL ==
Round	Pick	Player	Position	NFL club
1	26	Jermaine Johnson II	DE	New York Jets
