= 2021 NCAA Division I FBS football season =

American college football season

2021 NCAA Division I FBS season
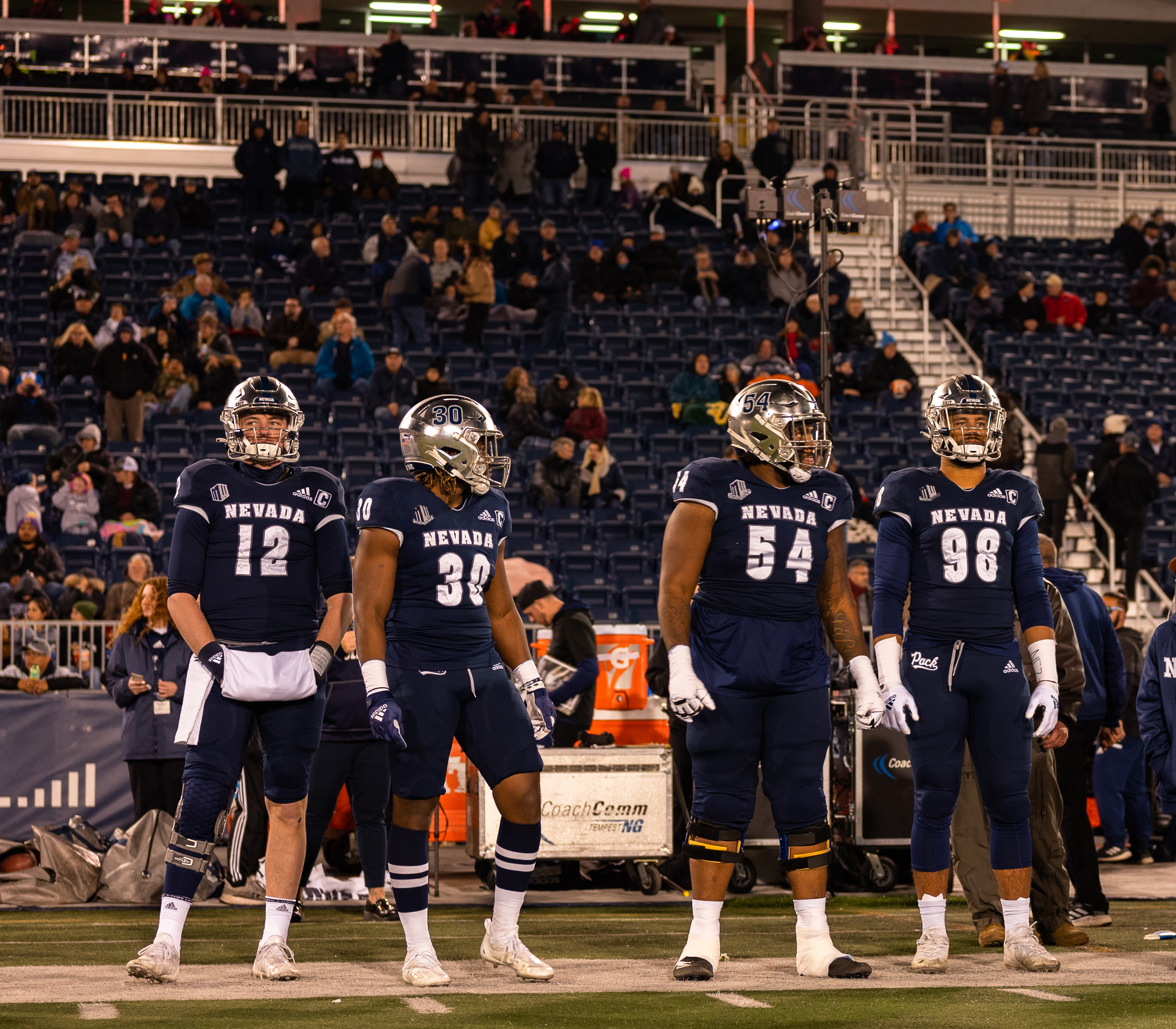
- Nevada C-130 pilots honored during coin toss prior to Nevada versus Air Force football game.
- Number of teams: 130
- Duration: August 28 – December 11, 2021
- Preseason AP No. 1: Alabama

Postseason
- Duration: December 17, 2021 – February 19, 2022
- Bowl games: 43 (Note: Bowl count includes the National Championship game. The Hawaii Bowl, Military Bowl, Fenway Bowl, Arizona Bowl, and Holiday Bowl were subsequently canceled.)
- AP Poll No. 1: Georgia
- Coaches Poll No. 1: Georgia
- Heisman Trophy: Bryce Young, QB, Alabama

College Football Playoff
- 2022 College Football Playoff National Championship
- Site: Lucas Oil Stadium (Indianapolis, Indiana)
- Champion(s): Georgia

NCAA Division I FBS football seasons
- ← 2020 2022 →

The 2021 NCAA Division I FBS football season was the 152nd season of college football in the United States organized by the National Collegiate Athletic Association (NCAA) at its highest level of competition, the Football Bowl Subdivision. The regular season began on August 28, 2021, and ended on December 11, 2021. The postseason began on December 17, with the main games ending on January 10, 2022, with the College Football Playoff National Championship at Lucas Oil Stadium in Indianapolis, and the all-star portion of the post-season concluding with the inaugural HBCU Legacy Bowl on February 19, 2022. It was the eighth season of the College Football Playoff (CFP) system. It was the first time since 2016 that no major team finished the season undefeated as the Cincinnati Bearcats, the season's last undefeated team, were defeated in the 2021 Cotton Bowl Classic. The season's Heisman Trophy winner was Alabama Crimson Tide quarterback Bryce Young.

== Rule changes ==
The following rule changes, recommended by the NCAA Football Rules Committee for the 2021 season on March 12 of that year, were approved by the NCAA Playing Rules Oversight Panel on April 22.

- In overtime, teams scoring a touchdown will be required to attempt a two-point conversion starting with the second overtime period (previously the third overtime period). If the scores are still tied at the expiration of the second overtime, teams will be required to attempt alternating two point conversions starting with the third overtime (previously the fifth overtime period). Teams can still choose to go for the PAT kick or two-point conversion during the first overtime period. The first game using this procedure was on September 18 between Utah and San Diego State, won by SDSU 33–31 in three overtimes. On October 23, the all-time FBS record for most overtimes in a single game was broken when Illinois defeated host Penn State 20–18 in nine overtimes.
- Permanently extending the team area from between the 25-yard lines to between the 20-yard lines. A rule implemented for the 2020 season due to the COVID-19 pandemic had extended this area to between the 15-yard lines, but it had been scheduled to revert to the 25 for 2021.
- Provide a framework to allow a school or conference to request a postgame video review about questionable actions (i.e. feigning injuries to stop the clock and slow down teams' momentum) through the NCAA secretary-rules editor/national coordinator of officials.
- Explicitly prohibiting video board and lighting system operators from creating "any distraction that obstructs play", with violations being deemed unsportsmanlike conduct.
- If replay overturns a call on the field, the game clock will only be adjusted inside of the last 2:00 of the first half and the last 5:00 of the second half.

Another rule change was made during the season:

- After Pitt quarterback Kenny Pickett's fake slide in the 2021 ACC Championship Game against Wake Forest, the NCAA Football Rules Committee changed the interpretation of the "QB Slide Rule" to require officials to interpret a fake slide as "giving himself up" and blow the play dead.

"Points of Emphasis" for the 2021 season included:

- Any taunting action toward an opponent will be penalized.
- Automatic unsportsmanlike conduct penalties will be imposed on a coach who leaves the team area or goes onto the field of play to argue with the officials.
- Officials are to be more alert to players significantly in violation of uniform rules (specifically pants, jerseys, and T-shirts that extend below the torso), and to send violators out of the game to correct the issue.

== Other headlines ==
- On April 15, 2021, the NCAA Division I Council adopted legislation that extended the so-called "one-time transfer exception" to all D-I sports, with the Division I Board of Directors ratifying this on April 28. This allows student-athletes in baseball, men's and women's basketball, football, and men's ice hockey to transfer one time without having to sit out a year, placing them under the same transfer regulations that previously applied to all other D-I sports.
- On June 10, the College Football Playoff announced that it had begun work on a proposal to expand the playoff to 12 teams in the indefinite future. Under the proposed format:
  - The six conference champions ranked highest by the CFP selection committee would receive automatic berths. The field would be filled out by the committee's six highest-ranked remaining teams, with no restrictions on conference affiliation.
  - The four highest-ranked conference champions would receive first-round byes.
  - The remaining 8 teams would play first-round games hosted by the higher seeds.
  - The quarterfinals and semifinals would be hosted by existing bowl games, with the final continuing to be held at a separately determined neutral site.
- On June 21, the Supreme Court of the United States ruled in National Collegiate Athletic Association v. Alston that the NCAA had no authority to limit education-related non-cash compensation for athletes, but stopped short of addressing direct cash payments to college athletes.
- On July 21, the Houston Chronicle reported that Oklahoma and Texas had approached the Southeastern Conference about the possibility of joining that league, and that an announcement could come in early August. The SEC and both schools refused comment on this report, but did not issue definitive denials.
- On July 26, Oklahoma and Texas notified the Big 12 Conference that the two schools do not wish to extend its grant of television rights beyond the 2024–25 athletic year and intend to leave the conference.
- On July 27, Oklahoma and Texas reached out to the SEC about acceptance into the conference in 2025.
- July 28 – The Big 12 sent a cease-and-desist letter to ESPN, accusing the network of tortious interference by working with other conferences attempting to lure Big 12 members in a bid to ease Oklahoma's and Texas' exits for the SEC. The network denied the allegations.
- July 29 – The presidents and chancellors of the 14 current SEC members voted unanimously to extend invitations to Oklahoma and Texas, effective in 2025.
- July 30 – The boards of regents of both Oklahoma and Texas unanimously accepted the SEC's invitations.
- August 16 – The Associated Press released its preseason rankings, with Alabama as the overwhelming choice for #1. Other ranking highlights:
  - Iowa State received its highest AP ranking in school history at #7.
  - Coastal Carolina and Louisiana, respectively #22 and #23, became the first Sun Belt Conference teams to be ranked in the preseason.
- August 24 – The Pac-12 Conference, Big Ten Conference, and Atlantic Coast Conference announced an alliance designed to "stabilize the current environment" by collaborating on a number of issues, including scheduling for football, men's and women's basketball.
- September 3 – Multiple media outlets reported that the Big 12 was on the verge of inviting four schools—American Athletic Conference members Cincinnati, Houston, and UCF, plus BYU, an FBS independent and otherwise a member of the non-football West Coast Conference. All four schools were reportedly preparing membership applications, and reports were that their future entrance could be approved as early as the next scheduled meeting of Big 12 presidents on September 10. The entry timeline was uncertain at the time of the report, but 2024 was seen as the likeliest date.
- September 10 – BYU, Cincinnati, Houston, and UCF were officially announced as incoming Big 12 members no later than 2024–25.
- October 18 – Yahoo Sports reported that The American, which had been rocked by the impending departure of three of its most prominent schools, was preparing to receive applications from six of the 14 members of Conference USA—Charlotte, Florida Atlantic, North Texas, Rice, UAB, and UTSA. Should all six schools join, The American would become a 14-team conference in all sports. (Navy is a football-only member, while Wichita State is a full member but does not sponsor football.)
- October 19 – ESPN reported that all six C-USA members named in Yahoo Sports' report had submitted applications to The American, and that each would receive a formal letter by the end of that week (October 22) detailing the terms of expansion.
- October 21 – The six aforementioned C-USA members were announced as incoming members of The American at a date to be determined.
- October 22 – The Action Network reported that C-USA member Southern Miss had accepted an invitation to join the Sun Belt Conference in 2023, though no formal announcement had then been made. The report added that the Sun Belt was preparing to add two other C-USA members, Marshall and Old Dominion, as well as FCS program James Madison. At the time, formal announcements of new members were expected on October 25, but an announcement regarding Marshall was likely to wait until after the school announced its new president on October 28.
- October 26 – Southern Miss was officially announced as a Sun Belt member, effective no later than July 2023. In other Sun Belt realignment news, it was reported that Old Dominion's arrival would be announced later that week, and that James Madison's board had scheduled an emergency meeting on October 29 (presumably to discuss a Sun Belt invitation).
- October 27 – Old Dominion was officially announced as a Sun Belt member, also effective no later than July 2023. This marked ODU's return to that conference after an absence of more than 30 years.
- October 30 – The day after both the Sun Belt Conference and Marshall issued tweets indicating that the Thundering Herd had accepted a Sun Belt invitation, this move was officially announced.
- November 5 – Multiple media outlets reported that Conference USA, which had nine of their schools depart to other separate conferences, handed out invitations to four schools: FBS independents Liberty and New Mexico State as well as FCS programs Jacksonville State and Sam Houston State, which were all accepted.
- November 6 – James Madison made their move to the Sun Belt official, effective no later than July 2023.
- November 23 – Cincinnati became the first Group of Five team ever to receive a top-four College Football Playoff ranking, coming in at fourth in this week's rankings.
- December 5 – The College Football Playoff field was revealed, featuring (in order of seeding) Alabama, Michigan, Georgia, and Cincinnati. This marked the first time a Group of Five team received a CFP berth.
- December 17 – After Coastal Carolina's 47–41 win over Northern Illinois in the Cure Bowl, Coastal quarterback Grayson McCall finished the season with a 207.6 passer rating, breaking the FBS record of 203.1 set last season by Alabama's Mac Jones.
- December 18 – During Western Kentucky's 59–38 win over Appalachian State in the Boca Raton Bowl, WKU quarterback Bailey Zappe broke two major single-season FBS passing records and equaled a single-season FBS total offense record:
  - 5,967 passing yards (surpassing the 5,833 yards of Texas Tech's B. J. Symons in 2003)
  - 62 passing touchdowns (surpassing the 60 TDs of LSU's Joe Burrow in 2019)
  - 65 touchdowns responsible for (combined passing and rushing; equals Burrow's 2019 mark)
- December 22 – After San Diego State's 38–24 win over UTSA in the Frisco Bowl, SDSU punter and placekicker Matt Araiza ended the season with a 51.19-yard punting average, breaking the FBS single-season record of 50.98 yards set by Braden Mann of Texas A&M in 2018.
- January 1 - Ohio State receiver Jaxon Smith-Njigba set an all-time FBS bowl game record with 347 receiving yards on 15 catches in the Rose Bowl game against Utah. He also broke the Ohio State team record for receiving yards in a game and in a single season.

== Conference realignment and new programs ==
=== Membership changes ===
School	Former conference	New conference
UConn Huskies (Note: UConn became independent in 2020, but canceled its 2020 season.)	American Athletic Conference	Independent
Notre Dame Fighting Irish	Atlantic Coast Conference (2020 only) (Note: Notre Dame became a temporary full member of the ACC in 2020 due to the move by most conferences to play conference-only schedules during the pandemic season.)	Independent

- James Madison will leave the Colonial Athletic Association and join the Sun Belt Conference in 2022.
- Marshall will leave the Conference USA and join the Sun Belt in 2022.
- Old Dominion will leave the Conference USA and join the Sun Belt in 2022.
- Southern Miss will leave the Conference USA and join the Sun Belt in 2022.

== Stadiums ==
- This was the first season for UAB at Protective Stadium, replacing its old stadium, Legion Field. The first game was a 36–12 UAB loss to Liberty on October 2.
- With the closure of Aloha Stadium to future events and plans to build a new stadium on the site, Hawaii is playing through at least the 2023 season at the on-campus Clarence T. C. Ching Athletics Complex, home to the university's track and field program. A project expanded the stadium to at least 10,000 in time for the 2021 season, and was completed in just over four months. However, due to city and state COVID-19 public health orders restricting gatherings, and taking into consideration the isolated nature of the state from the mainland in receiving aid to deal with the pandemic, all games were to be played behind closed doors until further notice. It is the only team in Division I FBS that is restricting attendance. On October 8, 2021, Mayor of Honolulu Rick Blangiardi gave permission for the stadium to host 1,000 spectators. All spectators must wear masks and be fully-vaccinated (if capable of being so). In November 2021, capacity limitations were lifted, but all other restrictions remained in force.
- This was the last of two seasons that San Diego State spent at its temporary home of Dignity Health Sports Park in Carson, California. SDSU will move to the new Snapdragon Stadium, nearing completion on part of the property formerly occupied by the team's since-demolished San Diego Stadium, next season.

== Kickoff games ==
Rankings reflect the AP Poll entering each week.

=== "Week Zero" ===
The regular season began on Saturday, August 28 with five games in Week 0.

- Nebraska 22 at Illinois 30 (Note: Illinois and Nebraska were originally scheduled to play at Aviva Stadium in Dublin, Ireland for the Aer Lingus College Football Classic. The game was moved back to the United States due to travel concerns during the COVID-19 pandemic.)
- UConn 0 at Fresno State 45
- Hawaii 10 at UCLA 44
- UTEP 30 at New Mexico State 3
- Southern Utah 14 at San Jose State 45

=== Week 1 ===
The majority of FBS teams opened the season on Labor Day weekend. Eight neutral-site "kickoff" games were held.

- Wednesday, September 1
  - Montgomery Kickoff (Cramton Bowl, Montgomery, Alabama): Jacksonville State 0 vs. UAB 31
- Thursday, September 2
  - Duke's Mayo Classic (Bank of America Stadium, Charlotte): Appalachian State 33 vs. East Carolina 19
- Saturday, September 4
  - Chick-fil-A Kickoff Game (Mercedes-Benz Stadium, Atlanta): No. 1 Alabama 44 vs. No. 14 Miami (FL) 13
  - Duke's Mayo Classic (Bank of America Stadium, Charlotte): No. 3 Clemson 3 vs. No. 5 Georgia 10
  - Allstate Kickoff Classic (AT&T Stadium, Arlington, Texas): Kansas State 24 vs. Stanford 7
  - Texas Kickoff (NRG Stadium, Houston): Houston 21 vs. Texas Tech 38
  - Vegas Kickoff Classic (Allegiant Stadium, Paradise, Nevada): Arizona 16 vs. BYU 24
- Monday, September 6
  - Chick-fil-A Kickoff Game (Mercedes-Benz Stadium, Atlanta): Louisville 24 vs. Ole Miss 43

== Regular season top 10 matchups ==
Rankings reflect the AP Poll. Rankings for Week 10 and beyond will list College Football Playoff Rankings first and AP Poll second. Teams that failed to be a top 10 team for one poll or the other will be noted.

- Week 1
  - No. 5 Georgia defeated No. 3 Clemson, 10–3 (Bank of America Stadium, Charlotte, North Carolina)
- Week 2
  - No. 10 Iowa defeated No. 9 Iowa State, 27–17 (Jack Trice Stadium, Ames, Iowa)
- Week 5
  - No. 2 Georgia defeated No. 8 Arkansas, 37–0 (Sanford Stadium, Athens, Georgia)
  - No. 7 Cincinnati defeated No. 9 Notre Dame, 24–13 (Notre Dame Stadium, South Bend, Indiana)
- Week 6
  - No. 3 Iowa defeated No. 4 Penn State, 23–20 (Kinnick Stadium, Iowa City, Iowa)
- Week 9
  - No. 8 Michigan State defeated No. 6 Michigan, 37–33 (Spartan Stadium, East Lansing, Michigan)
- Week 12
  - No. 4/5 Ohio State defeated No. 7/7 Michigan State, 56–7 (Ohio Stadium, Columbus, Ohio)
- Week 13
  - No. 5/6 Michigan defeated No. 2/2 Ohio State, 42–27 (Michigan Stadium, Ann Arbor, Michigan)
  - No. 7/7 Oklahoma State defeated No. 10/10 Oklahoma, 37–33 (Boone Pickens Stadium, Stillwater, Oklahoma)
- Week 14
  - No. 3/4 Alabama defeated No 1/1 Georgia 41–24 (2021 SEC Championship Game, Mercedes-Benz Stadium, Atlanta, Georgia)
  - No. 9/9 Baylor defeated No. 5/5 Oklahoma State, 21–16 (2021 Big 12 Championship Game, AT&T Stadium, Arlington, Texas)

== FCS team wins over FBS teams ==
Italics denotes FCS teams.

Date	Visiting team	Home team	Site	Result	Attendance	Ref.
September 2	No. 23 (FCS) UC Davis	Tulsa	Skelly Field at H. A. Chapman Stadium • Tulsa, Oklahoma	19–17	15,085	
September 2	No. 11 (FCS) Eastern Washington	UNLV	Allegiant Stadium • Paradise, Nevada	35–33 ^{2OT}	21,970	
September 3	No. 3 (FCS) South Dakota State	Colorado State	Canvas Stadium • Fort Collins, Colorado	42–23	32,327	
September 4	Holy Cross	UConn	Pratt & Whitney Stadium at Rentschler Field • East Hartford, Connecticut	38–28	18,782	
September 4	No. 9 (FCS) Montana	No. 20 Washington	Husky Stadium • Seattle, Washington	13–7	64,053	
September 4	East Tennessee State	Vanderbilt	Vanderbilt Stadium • Nashville, Tennessee	23–3	22,029	
September 11	Duquesne	Ohio	Peden Stadium • Athens, Ohio	28–26	19,411	
September 11	No. 16 (FCS) Jacksonville State	Florida State	Doak Campbell Stadium • Tallahassee, Florida	20–17	60,198	
September 18	Incarnate Word	Texas State	Bobcat Stadium • San Marcos, Texas	42–34	16,107	
September 18	Northern Arizona	Arizona	Arizona Stadium • Tucson, Arizona	21–19	33,481	
November 6	Rhode Island	UMass	Warren McGuirk Alumni Stadium • Hadley, Massachusetts	35–22	7,284	
November 13	Maine	UMass	Warren McGuirk Alumni Stadium • Hadley, Massachusetts	35–10	5,331	
^{#}Rankings from AP Poll released prior to game.

== Upsets ==
This section lists instances of unranked teams defeating AP Poll-ranked teams during the season.

=== Regular season ===
During the regular season, 48 unranked FBS teams, plus 1 FCS team, defeated ranked FBS teams.

- September 3, 2021
  - Virginia Tech 17, No. 10 North Carolina 10
- September 4, 2021:
  - UCLA 38, No. 16 LSU 27
  - (No. 9 FCS) Montana 13, No. 20 Washington 7
- September 11, 2021:
  - Stanford 42, No. 14 USC 28
  - Arkansas 40, No. 15 Texas 21
  - BYU 26, No. 21 Utah 17
- September 18, 2021:
  - Fresno State 40, No. 13 UCLA 37
  - West Virginia 27, No. 15 Virginia Tech 21
  - Michigan State 38, No. 24 Miami (FL) 17
- September 25, 2021:
  - NC State 27, No. 9 Clemson 21 ^{2OT}
  - Baylor 31, No. 14 Iowa State 29
  - Georgia Tech 45, No. 21 North Carolina 22
  - Oklahoma State 31, No. 25 Kansas State 20
- October 2, 2021
  - Stanford 31, No. 3 Oregon 24 ^{OT}
  - Kentucky 20, No. 10 Florida 13
  - Mississippi State 26, No. 15 Texas A&M 22
  - Hawaii 27, No. 18 Fresno State 24
  - Arizona State 42, No. 20 UCLA 23
- October 9, 2021:
  - Texas A&M 41, No. 1 Alabama 38
  - Boise State 26, No. 10 BYU 17
- October 16, 2021:
  - Purdue 24, No. 2 Iowa 7
  - Auburn 38, No. 17 Arkansas 23
  - Utah 35, No. 18 Arizona State 21
  - Baylor 38, No. 19 BYU 24
  - LSU 49, No. 20 Florida 42
- October 20, 2021
  - Appalachian State 30, No. 14 Coastal Carolina 27
- October 23, 2021
  - Illinois 20, No. 7 Penn State 18 ^{9OT}
  - Iowa State 24, No. 8 Oklahoma State 21
  - Miami (FL) 31, No. 18 NC State 30
  - Wisconsin 30, No. 25 Purdue 13
- October 30, 2021
  - Wisconsin 27, No. 9 Iowa 7
  - Mississippi State 31, No. 12 Kentucky 17
  - Miami (FL) 38, No. 17 Pittsburgh 34
  - Houston 44, No. 19 SMU 37
  - Fresno State 30, No. 21 San Diego State 20
  - West Virginia 38, No. 22 Iowa State 31
- November 6, 2021
  - Purdue 40, No. 5 Michigan State 29
  - North Carolina 58, No. 10 Wake Forest 55
  - TCU 30, No. 14 Baylor 28
  - Tennessee 45, No. 18 Kentucky 42
  - Memphis 28, No. 23 SMU 25
  - Boise State 40, No. 25 Fresno State 14
- November 13, 2021
  - Mississippi State 43, No. 16 Auburn 34
  - Georgia State 42, No. 22 Coastal Carolina 40
- November 20, 2021
  - Clemson 48, No. 13 Wake Forest 27
- November 27, 2021
  - North Texas 45, No. 15 UTSA 27
  - Minnesota 23, No. 18 Wisconsin 13
  - LSU 27, No. 14 Texas A&M 24
- December 4, 2021
  - Utah State 46, No. 19 San Diego State 13

=== Bowl games ===
Rankings in this section are based on the final CFP rankings released on December 5, 2021.

- December 18, 2021
  - UAB 31, No. 13 BYU 28 (Independence Bowl)

== Conference standings ==
2021 American Athletic Conference football standings
	Conf.			Overall
Team	W		L	W		L
No. 4 Cincinnati y$^	8	–	0	13	–	1
No. 17 Houston y	8	–	0	12	–	2
UCF	5	–	3	9	–	4
East Carolina	5	–	3	7	–	5
Tulsa	5	–	3	7	–	6
SMU	4	–	4	8	–	4
Memphis	3	–	5	6	–	6
Navy	3	–	5	4	–	8
Tulane	1	–	7	2	–	10
South Florida	1	–	7	2	–	10
Temple	1	–	7	3	–	9
Championship: Cincinnati 35, Houston 20
^ – College Football Playoff participant; $ – Conference champion; y – Championship game participant; Rankings from AP Poll

2021 Atlantic Coast Conference football standings
	Conf.			Overall
Team	W		L	W		L
Atlantic Division
No. 15 Wake Forest xy	7	–	1	11	–	3
No. 20 NC State	6	–	2	9	–	3
No. 14 Clemson	6	–	2	10	–	3
Louisville	4	–	4	6	–	7
Florida State	4	–	4	5	–	7
Boston College	2	–	6	6	–	6
Syracuse	2	–	6	5	–	7
Coastal Division
No. 13 Pittsburgh xy$	7	–	1	11	–	3
Miami (FL)	5	–	3	7	–	5
Virginia Tech	4	–	4	6	–	7
Virginia	4	–	4	6	–	6
North Carolina	3	–	5	6	–	7
Georgia Tech	2	–	6	3	–	9
Duke	0	–	8	3	–	9
Championship: Pittsburgh 45, Wake Forest 21
$ – Conference champion; x – Division champion/co-champions; y – Championship game participant; Rankings from AP Poll

2021 Big Ten Conference football standings
	Conf.			Overall
Team	W		L	W		L
East Division
No. 3 Michigan xy$^	8	–	1	12	–	2
No. 6 Ohio State x	8	–	1	11	–	2
No. 9 Michigan State	7	–	2	11	–	2
Penn State	4	–	5	7	–	6
Maryland	3	–	6	7	–	6
Rutgers	2	–	7	5	–	8
Indiana	0	–	9	2	–	10
West Division
No. 23 Iowa xy	7	–	2	10	–	4
Minnesota	6	–	3	9	–	4
Wisconsin	6	–	3	9	–	4
Purdue	6	–	3	9	–	4
Illinois	4	–	5	5	–	7
Nebraska	1	–	8	3	–	9
Northwestern	1	–	8	3	–	9
Championship: Michigan 42, Iowa 3
^ – College Football Playoff participant; $ – Conference champion; x – Division champion/co-champions; y – Championship game participant; Rankings from AP Poll

2021 Big 12 Conference football standings
	Conf.			Overall
Team	W		L	W		L
No. 7 Oklahoma State y	8	–	1	12	–	2
No. 5 Baylor y$	7	–	2	12	–	2
No. 10 Oklahoma	7	–	2	11	–	2
Iowa State	5	–	4	7	–	6
Kansas State	4	–	5	8	–	5
West Virginia	4	–	5	6	–	7
Texas	3	–	6	5	–	7
TCU	3	–	6	5	–	7
Texas Tech	3	–	6	7	–	6
Kansas	1	–	8	2	–	10
Championship: Baylor 21, Oklahoma State 16
$ – Conference champion; y – Championship game participant; Rankings from AP Poll

2021 Conference USA football standings
	Conf.			Overall
Team	W		L	W		L
East Division
Western Kentucky xy	7	–	1	9	–	5
Marshall	5	–	3	7	–	6
Old Dominion	5	–	3	6	–	7
Middle Tennessee	4	–	4	7	–	6
Florida Atlantic	3	–	5	5	–	7
Charlotte	3	–	5	5	–	7
FIU	0	–	8	1	–	11
West Division
UTSA xy$	7	–	1	12	–	2
UAB	6	–	2	9	–	4
North Texas	5	–	3	6	–	7
UTEP	4	–	4	7	–	6
Rice	3	–	5	4	–	8
Southern Miss	2	–	6	3	–	9
Louisiana Tech	2	–	6	3	–	9
Championship: UTSA 49, Western Kentucky 41
$ – Conference champion; x – Division champion/co-champions; y – Championship game participant

2021 Mid-American Conference football standings
	Conf.			Overall
Team	W		L	W		L
East Division
Kent State xy	6	–	2	7	–	7
Miami (OH)	5	–	3	7	–	6
Ohio	3	–	5	3	–	9
Bowling Green	2	–	6	4	–	8
Buffalo	2	–	6	4	–	8
Akron	1	–	7	2	–	10
West Division
Northern Illinois xy$	6	–	2	9	–	5
Central Michigan x	6	–	2	9	–	4
Toledo	5	–	3	7	–	6
Ball State	4	–	4	6	–	7
Eastern Michigan	4	–	4	7	–	6
Western Michigan	4	–	4	8	–	5
Championship: Northern Illinois 41, Kent State 23
$ – Conference champion; x – Division champion/co-champions; y – Championship game participant

2021 Mountain West Conference football standings
	Conf.			Overall
Team	W		L	W		L
Mountain Division
No. 24 Utah State xy$	6	–	2	11	–	3
Air Force x	6	–	2	10	–	3
Boise State	5	–	3	7	–	5
Wyoming	2	–	6	7	–	6
Colorado State	2	–	6	3	–	9
New Mexico	1	–	7	3	–	9
West Division
No. 25 San Diego State xy	7	–	1	12	–	2
Fresno State	6	–	2	10	–	3
Nevada	5	–	3	8	–	5
Hawaii	3	–	5	6	–	7
San Jose State	3	–	5	5	–	7
UNLV	2	–	6	2	–	10
Championship: Utah State 46, San Diego State 13
$ – Conference champion; x – Division champion/co-champions; y – Championship game participant; Rankings from AP Poll

2021 Pac-12 Conference football standings
	Conf.			Overall
Team	W		L	W		L
North Division
No. 22 Oregon xy	7	–	2	10	–	4
Washington State	6	–	3	7	–	6
Oregon State	5	–	4	7	–	6
California	4	–	5	5	–	7
Washington	3	–	6	4	–	8
Stanford	2	–	7	3	–	9
South Division
No. 12 Utah xy$	8	–	1	10	–	4
UCLA	6	–	3	8	–	4
Arizona State†	0	–	3	0	–	5
USC	3	–	6	4	–	8
Colorado	3	–	6	4	–	8
Arizona	1	–	8	1	–	11
Championship: Utah 38, Oregon 10
$ – Conference champion; x – Division champion/co-champions; y – Championship game participant; Rankings from AP Poll

2021 Southeastern Conference football standings
	Conf.			Overall
Team	W		L	W		L
Eastern Division
No. 1 Georgia x#^	8	–	0	14	–	1
No. 18 Kentucky*	5	–	3	10	–	3
Tennessee	4	–	4	7	–	6
Missouri	3	–	5	6	–	7
South Carolina	3	–	5	7	–	6
Florida	2	–	6	6	–	7
Vanderbilt	0	–	8	2	–	10
Western Division
No. 2 Alabama x$^	7	–	1	13	–	2
No. 11 Ole Miss	6	–	2	10	–	3
No. 21 Arkansas	4	–	4	9	–	4
Mississippi State	4	–	4	7	–	6
Texas A&M	4	–	4	8	–	4
Auburn	3	–	5	6	–	7
LSU	3	–	5	6	–	7
Championship: Alabama 41, Georgia 24
# – College Football Playoff champion; ^ – College Football Playoff participant; $ – Conference champion; x – Division champion/co-champions; * – Kentucky vacated all wins due to NCAA violations.; Rankings from AP Poll

2021 Sun Belt Conference football standings
	Conf.			Overall
Team	W		L	W		L
East Division
Appalachian State xy	7	–	1	10	–	4
Georgia State	6	–	2	8	–	5
Coastal Carolina	6	–	2	11	–	2
Troy	3	–	5	5	–	7
Georgia Southern	2	–	6	3	–	9
West Division
No. 16 Louisiana xy$	8	–	0	13	–	1
Texas State	3	–	5	4	–	8
Louisiana–Monroe	2	–	6	4	–	8
South Alabama	2	–	6	5	–	7
Arkansas State	1	–	7	2	–	10
Championship: Louisiana 24, Appalachian State 16
$ – Conference champion; x – Division champion/co-champions; y – Championship game participant; Rankings from AP Poll

2021 NCAA Division I FBS independents football records
	Conf.			Overall
Team	W		L	W		L
No. 8 Notre Dame		–		11	–	2
No. 19 BYU		–		10	–	3
Army		–		9	–	4
Liberty		–		8	–	5
New Mexico State		–		2	–	10
UMass		–		1	–	11
UConn		–		1	–	11
Rankings from AP Poll

== Rankings ==
The top 25 from the AP and USA Today Coaches Polls.

=== Pre-season polls ===
AP
Ranking	Team
1	Alabama (47)
2	Oklahoma (6)
3	Clemson (6)
4	Ohio State (1)
5	Georgia (3)
6	Texas A&M
7	Iowa State
8	Cincinnati
9	Notre Dame
10	North Carolina
11	Oregon
12	Wisconsin
13	Florida
14	Miami (FL)
15	USC
16	LSU
17	Indiana
18	Iowa
19	Penn State
20	Washington
21	Texas
22	Coastal Carolina
23	Louisiana
24	Utah
25	Arizona State

USA today coaches
Ranking	Team
1	Alabama (63)
2	Clemson
3	Oklahoma (2)
4	Ohio State
5	Georgia
6	Texas A&M
7	Notre Dame
8	Iowa State
9	North Carolina
10	Cincinnati
11	Florida
12	Oregon
13	LSU
14	USC
15	Wisconsin
16	Miami
17	Indiana
18	Iowa
19	Texas
20	Penn State
21	Washington
22	Oklahoma State
23	Louisiana
24	Coastal Carolina
25	Ole Miss

=== CFB Playoff final rankings ===
On December 5, 2021, the College Football Playoff selection committee announced its final team rankings for the year.

Rank	Team	W–L	Conference and standing	Bowl game
1	Alabama	12–1	SEC Champion	Cotton Bowl (CFP semifinal)
2	Michigan	12–1	Big Ten Champion	Orange Bowl (CFP semifinal)
3	Georgia	12–1	SEC runner-up	Orange Bowl (CFP semifinal)
4	Cincinnati	13–0	AAC Champion	Cotton Bowl (CFP semifinal)
5	Notre Dame	11–1	FBS Independent	Fiesta Bowl (NY6)
6	Ohio State	10–2	Big Ten East 2nd place	Rose Bowl (NY6)
7	Baylor	11–2	Big 12 Champion	Sugar Bowl (NY6)
8	Ole Miss	10–2	SEC West 2nd place	Sugar Bowl (NY6)
9	Oklahoma State	11–2	Big 12 runner-up	Fiesta Bowl (NY6)
10	Michigan State	10–2	Big Ten East 3rd place	Peach Bowl (NY6)
11	Utah	10–3	Pac-12 Champion	Rose Bowl (NY6)
12	Pittsburgh	11–2	ACC Champion	Peach Bowl (NY6)
13	BYU	10–2	FBS Independent	Independence Bowl
14	Oregon	10–3	Pac-12 runner-up	Alamo Bowl
15	Iowa	10–3	Big Ten runner-up	Citrus Bowl
16	Oklahoma	10–2	Big 12 3rd place	Alamo Bowl
17	Wake Forest	10–3	ACC runner-up	Gator Bowl
18	NC State	9–3	ACC Atlantic 2nd place	Holiday Bowl
19	Clemson	9–3	ACC Atlantic 3rd place	Cheez-It Bowl
20	Houston	11–2	AAC runner-up	Birmingham Bowl
21	Arkansas	8–4	SEC West 3rd place	Outback Bowl
22	Kentucky	9–3	SEC East 2nd place	Citrus Bowl
23	Louisiana	12–1	Sun Belt champion	New Orleans Bowl
24	San Diego State	11–2	Mountain West runner-up	Frisco Bowl
25	Texas A&M	8–4	SEC West 5th place	Gator Bowl

=== Final rankings ===
Rank	Associated Press	Coaches' Poll
1	Georgia (61)	Georgia (62)
2	Alabama	
3	Michigan	
4	Cincinnati	
5	Baylor	Ohio State
6	Ohio State	Baylor
7	Oklahoma State	
8	Notre Dame	
9	Michigan State	
10	Oklahoma	
11	Ole Miss	
12	Utah	
13	Pittsburgh	
14	Clemson	Wake Forest
15	Wake Forest	Kentucky
16	Louisiana	Clemson
17	Houston	
18	Kentucky	Louisiana
19	BYU	NC State
20	NC State	Arkansas
21	Arkansas	Oregon
22	Oregon	BYU
23	Iowa	
24	Utah State	
25	San Diego State	Texas A&M

== Conference summaries ==
Rankings in this section are based on CFP rankings released prior to the games.

Conference	Championship game				Overall Player of the Year/MVP	Offensive Player of the Year	Defensive Player of the Year	Special Teams Player of the Year	Coach of the Year
Conference	Date	Champion	Score	Runner-up	Overall Player of the Year/MVP	Offensive Player of the Year	Defensive Player of the Year	Special Teams Player of the Year	Coach of the Year
ACC	Dec. 4	No 15 Pittsburgh (10−2)	45−21	No 16. Wake Forest (10−2)	Kenny Pickett, QB, Pittsburgh	Kenny Pickett, QB, Pittsburgh	Jermaine Johnson II, DE, Florida State	—N/a	Dave Clawson, Wake Forest
American	Dec. 4	No. 4 Cincinnati (12–0)	35–20	No. 21 Houston (11–1)	—N/a	Desmond Ridder, QB, Cincinnati	Sauce Gardner, CB, Cincinnati	Marcus Jones, KR/PR, Houston	Luke Fickell, Cincinnati
Big Ten	Dec. 4	No. 2 Michigan (11–1)	42–3	No. 13 Iowa (10−2)	—N/a	C. J. Stroud, QB, Ohio State	Aidan Hutchinson, DE, Michigan	Jake Moody, PK, Michigan; Jordan Stout, P, Penn State; & Charlie Jones, RS, Iowa (Note: The Big Ten presents separate awards for its top placekicker, punter, and return specialist.)	Mel Tucker, Michigan State (coaches & media)
Big 12	Dec. 4	No. 9 Baylor (10–2)	21–16	No. 5 Oklahoma State (11–1)	—N/a	Breece Hall, RB, Iowa State	Jalen Pitre, DB, Baylor	Trestan Ebner, KR/PR, Baylor	Mike Gundy, Oklahoma State
C–USA	Dec. 3	UTSA (11–1)	49–41	Western Kentucky (8–4)	Bailey Zappe, QB, Western Kentucky	Sincere McCormick, RB, UTSA	DeAngelo Malone, DE, Western Kentucky	Tommy Heatherly, P, FIU	Jeff Traylor, UTSA
MAC	Dec. 4	Northern Illinois (8–4)	41–23	Kent State (7–5)	—N/a	Lew Nichols III, RB, Central Michigan	Ali Fayad, DE, Western Michigan	Kalil Pimpleton, PR, Central Michigan	Thomas Hammock, Northern Illinois
MW	Dec. 4	Utah State (9–3)	46–13	No. 19 San Diego State (11–1)	—N/a	Carson Strong, QB, Nevada	Cameron Thomas, DL, San Diego State	Matt Araiza, P/PK, San Diego State	Brady Hoke, San Diego State
Pac-12	Dec. 3	No. 17 Utah (9–3)	38–10	No. 10 Oregon (10–2)	—N/a	Drake London, WR, USC	Devin Lloyd, LB, Utah	—N/a	Kyle Whittingham, Utah
SEC	Dec. 4	No. 3 Alabama (11–1)	41–24	No. 1 Georgia (12–0)	—N/a	Bryce Young, QB, Alabama	Will Anderson Jr., LB, Alabama	Jameson Williams, WR, Alabama; Velus Jones Jr, WR, Tennessee	Kirby Smart, Georgia
Sun Belt	Dec. 4	No. 24 Louisiana (11–1)	24–16	Appalachian State (10–2)	Grayson McCall, QB, Coastal Carolina	Jalen Tolbert, WR, South Alabama	D'Marco Jackson, LB, Appalachian State	—N/a	Billy Napier, Louisiana

=== Conference champions' bowl games ===
Ranks are per the final CFP rankings, released on December 5, with win–loss records at that time.

Conference	Champion	W–L	Rank	Bowl game
ACC	Pittsburgh	11–2	12	Peach Bowl (NY6)
American	Cincinnati ^{CFP}	13–0	4	Cotton Bowl (semifinal)
Big Ten	Michigan ^{CFP}	12–1	2	Orange Bowl (semifinal)
Big 12	Baylor	11–2	7	Sugar Bowl (NY6)
C-USA	UTSA	12–1		Frisco Bowl
MAC	Northern Illinois	9–4		Cure Bowl
Mountain West	Utah State	10–3		LA Bowl
Pac-12	Utah	10–3	11	Rose Bowl (NY6)
SEC	Alabama ^{CFP}	12–1	1	Cotton Bowl (semifinal)
Sun Belt	Louisiana	12–1	23	New Orleans Bowl

^{CFP} College Football Playoff participant

== Postseason ==
There are 42 team-competitive FBS post-season bowl games, with two teams advancing to a 43rd – the CFP National Championship game. Normally, a team is required to have a .500 minimum winning percentage during the regular season to become bowl-eligible (six wins for an 11- or 12-game schedule, and seven wins for a 13-game schedule). If there are not enough winning teams to fulfill all open bowl slots, teams with losing records may be chosen to fill all 84 bowl slots. Additionally, on the rare occasion in which a conference champion does not meet eligibility requirements, they are usually still chosen for bowl games via tie-ins for their conference.

=== Bowl-eligible teams ===
- ACC (10): Boston College, Clemson, Louisville, Miami (FL), NC State, North Carolina, Pittsburgh, Virginia, Virginia Tech, Wake Forest
- American (7): Cincinnati, East Carolina, Houston, Memphis, SMU, Tulsa, UCF
- Big Ten (9): Iowa, Maryland, Michigan, Michigan State, Minnesota, Ohio State, Penn State, Purdue, Wisconsin
- Big 12 (7): Baylor, Iowa State, Kansas State, Oklahoma, Oklahoma State, Texas Tech, West Virginia
- C-USA (8): Marshall, Middle Tennessee, North Texas, Old Dominion, UAB, UTEP, UTSA, Western Kentucky
- MAC (8): Ball State, Central Michigan, Eastern Michigan, Kent State, Miami (OH), Northern Illinois, Toledo, Western Michigan
- Mountain West (8): Air Force, Boise State, Fresno State, Hawaii, Nevada, San Diego State, Utah State, Wyoming
- Pac-12 (6): Arizona State, Oregon, Oregon State, UCLA, Utah, Washington State
- SEC (13): Alabama, Arkansas, Auburn, Florida, Georgia, Kentucky, LSU, Mississippi State, Missouri, Ole Miss, South Carolina, Tennessee, Texas A&M
- Sun Belt (4): Appalachian State, Coastal Carolina, Georgia State, Louisiana
- Independent (4): Army, BYU, Liberty, Notre Dame

Number of bowl berths available: 84
Number of bowl-eligible teams: 84

=== Bowl-eligible team that did not receive a berth ===
On December 2, NCAA announced the 42nd bowl game, thus guaranteeing all teams with six wins (83 bowl-eligible teams plus Hawaii with a 6–7 record) could play in a bowl game. The added bowl game, later named the 2021 Frisco Football Classic, essentially served as a replacement of the canceled San Francisco Bowl.

=== Bowl-ineligible teams ===
- ACC (4): Duke, Florida State, Georgia Tech, Syracuse
- American (4): Navy, South Florida, Temple, Tulane
- Big Ten (5): Illinois, Indiana, Nebraska, Northwestern, Rutgers*
- Big 12 (3): Kansas, TCU, Texas
- C-USA (6): Charlotte, Florida Atlantic, FIU, Louisiana Tech, Rice, Southern Miss
- MAC (4): Akron, Buffalo, Bowling Green, Ohio
- Mountain West (4): Colorado State, New Mexico, San Jose State, UNLV
- Pac-12 (6): Arizona, California, Colorado, Stanford, USC, Washington
- SEC (1): Vanderbilt
- Sun Belt (6): Arkansas State, Georgia Southern, Louisiana–Monroe, South Alabama, Texas State, Troy
- Independent (3): New Mexico State, UConn, UMass

Number of bowl-ineligible teams: 46
*Rutgers had the highest Academic Progress Rate (APR) of five-win teams. The NCAA announced on December 23 that Rutgers was the first eligible team, under APR regulations, to replace Texas A&M in the Gator Bowl. Rutgers accepted the bid.

=== College Football Playoff ===
Semifinals
December 31 – Cotton Bowl Classic AT&T Stadium, Arlington
1	Alabama	27
4	Cincinnati	6
December 31 – Orange Bowl Hard Rock Stadium, Miami Gardens
2	Michigan	11
3	Georgia	34

Championship
January 10 – National Championship Lucas Oil Stadium, Indianapolis
1	Alabama	18
3	Georgia	33

=== Conference performance in bowl games ===
Conference	Total games	Wins	Losses	Pct.
ACC	6	2	4	.333
Big Ten	10	6	4	.600
Big 12	7	5	2	.714
Pac-12	5	0	5	.000
SEC	14	6	8	.429
Independents	4	2	2	.500
The American	4	3	1	.750
C-USA	8	3	5	.375
MAC	8	3	5	.375
MW	6	5	1	.833
Sun Belt	4	3	1	.750

=== Count of bowl games ===
2021–22 FBS bowls planned	43	including the National Championship game
Canceled, prior to team selections	—	Note that the one-off 2021 Frisco Football Classic effectively served as a replacement for the San Francisco Bowl
Canceled, due to lack of teams	-1	Arizona Bowl
Canceled, after team selections	-3	Hawaii Bowl, Holiday Bowl, Military Bowl
Debuts postponed to 2022	-1	Fenway Bowl
2021–22 FBS bowl count	38	Bowls played / still scheduled to be played

== Awards and honors ==
=== Heisman Trophy voting ===
The Heisman Trophy is given to the year's most outstanding player

Player	School	Position	1st	2nd	3rd	Total
Bryce Young	Alabama	QB	684	107	45	2,311
Aidan Hutchinson	Michigan	DE	78	273	174	954
Kenny Pickett	Pittsburgh	QB	28	175	197	631
C. J. Stroud	Ohio State	QB	12	118	127	399
Will Anderson Jr.	Alabama	LB	31	79	74	325
Kenneth Walker III	Michigan State	RB	18	53	85	245
Matt Corral	Ole Miss	QB	10	32	56	150
Desmond Ridder	Cincinnati	QB	5	15	36	81
Jordan Davis	Georgia	DT	9	15	18	75
Breece Hall	Iowa State	RB	0	5	7	17

=== Other overall ===
- AP Player of the Year: Bryce Young, QB, Alabama
- Lombardi Award (top player): Aidan Hutchinson, DE, Michigan
- Maxwell Award (top player): Bryce Young, QB, Alabama
- SN Player of the Year: Bryce Young, QB, Alabama
- Walter Camp Award (top player): Kenneth Walker III, RB, Michigan State

=== Special overall ===
- Burlsworth Trophy (top player who began as walk-on): Grant Morgan, LB, Arkansas
- Paul Hornung Award (most versatile player): Marcus Jones, CB, Houston
- Jon Cornish Trophy (top Canadian player): John Metchie III, WR, Alabama
- Campbell Trophy ("academic Heisman"): Charlie Kolar, Iowa State
- Academic All-American of the Year: Charlie Kolar, Iowa State
- Wuerffel Trophy (humanitarian-athlete): Isaiah Sanders, QB, Stanford
- Senior CLASS Award (senior student-athlete): Kenny Pickett, QB, Pittsburgh

=== Offense ===
Quarterback

- Davey O'Brien Award: Bryce Young, Alabama
- Johnny Unitas Golden Arm Award (senior/4th year quarterback): Kenny Pickett, Pittsburgh
- Manning Award: Bryce Young, Alabama

Running back

- Doak Walker Award: Kenneth Walker III, Michigan State

Wide receiver

- Fred Biletnikoff Award: Jordan Addison, Pittsburgh

Tight end

- John Mackey Award: Trey McBride, Colorado State

Lineman:

- Rimington Trophy (center): Tyler Linderbaum, Iowa
- Outland Trophy (interior lineman on either offense or defense): Jordan Davis, DT, Georgia
- Joe Moore Award (offensive line): Michigan

=== Defense ===
- Bronko Nagurski Trophy (defensive player): Will Anderson Jr., LB, Alabama
- Chuck Bednarik Award (defensive player): Jordan Davis, DT, Georgia
- Lott Trophy (defensive impact): Aidan Hutchinson, DE, Michigan

Defensive front

- Dick Butkus Award (linebacker): Nakobe Dean, Georgia
- Ted Hendricks Award (defensive end): Aidan Hutchinson, Michigan

Defensive back

- Jim Thorpe Award: Coby Bryant, Cincinnati

=== Special teams ===
- Lou Groza Award (placekicker): Jake Moody, Michigan
- Ray Guy Award (punter): Matt Araiza, San Diego State
- Jet Award (return specialist): Marcus Jones, Houston
- Patrick Mannelly Award (long snapper): Cal Adomitis, Pittsburgh
- Peter Mortell Holder of the Year Award: Reid Bauer, Arkansas

=== Coaches ===
- AFCA Coach of the Year Award: Luke Fickell, Cincinnati
- AP Coach of the Year: Jim Harbaugh, Michigan
- Bobby Dodd Coach of the Year: Luke Fickell, Cincinnati
- Eddie Robinson Coach of the Year: Luke Fickell, Cincinnati
- George Munger Award: Dave Aranda, Baylor
- Home Depot Coach of the Year: Luke Fickell, Cincinnati
- Paul "Bear" Bryant Award: Luke Fickell, Cincinnati
- Walter Camp Coach of the Year: Luke Fickell, Cincinnati

==== Assistants ====
- AFCA Assistant Coach of the Year: Newland Isaac, Coastal Carolina
- Broyles Award: Josh Gattis, Michigan

== Coaching changes ==
=== Preseason and in-season ===
This is restricted to coaching changes taking place on or after May 1, 2021, and will include any changes announced after a team's last regularly scheduled game but before its bowl game. For coaching changes that occurred earlier in 2021, see 2020 NCAA Division I FBS end-of-season coaching changes.

Team	Outgoing coach	Current role	Date	Reason	Replacement
Ohio	Frank Solich	None	July 14, 2021	Retired	Tim Albin (promoted on July 14)
UConn	Randy Edsall	None	September 6, 2021	Resigned	Lou Spanos (interim)
USC	Clay Helton	Georgia Southern head coach	September 13, 2021	Fired	Donte Williams (interim)
Georgia Southern	Chad Lunsford	Florida Atlantic Special Teams coordinator/tight ends coach	September 26, 2021	Fired	Kevin Whitley (interim)
Washington State	Nick Rolovich	California senior offensive assistant	October 18, 2021	Fired	Jake Dickert (named full time on November 27)
Texas Tech	Matt Wells	Oklahoma Offensive Analyst	October 25, 2021	Fired	Sonny Cumbie (interim)
TCU	Gary Patterson	Texas special assistant to head coach	October 31, 2021	Parted ways	Jerry Kill (interim)
Akron	Tom Arth	Los Angeles Chargers Pass Game Specialist	November 4, 2021	Fired	Oscar Rodriguez (interim)
UMass	Walt Bell	Indiana offensive coordinator	November 7, 2021	Fired	Alex Miller (interim)
Washington	Jimmy Lake	Los Angeles Rams Senior defense assistant	November 14, 2021	Fired	Bob Gregory (interim)
Virginia Tech	Justin Fuente	None	November 16, 2021	Parted ways	J. C. Price (interim)
Florida	Dan Mullen	UNLV head coach	November 21, 2021	Fired	Greg Knox (interim)
Troy	Chip Lindsey	UCF offensive coordinator	November 21, 2021	Fired	Brandon Hall (interim)
SMU	Sonny Dykes	TCU head coach	November 26, 2021	Hired by TCU	Jim Leavitt (interim)
Oklahoma	Lincoln Riley	USC head coach	November 28, 2021	Hired by USC	Bob Stoops (interim; bowl)
LSU	Ed Orgeron	None	November 28, 2021	Parted ways	Brad Davis (interim; bowl)
Notre Dame	Brian Kelly	None	November 29, 2021	Hired by LSU	Marcus Freeman (promoted on December 3)
Fresno State	Kalen DeBoer	Alabama Head Coach	November 29, 2021	Hired by Washington	Lee Marks (interim; bowl)
Louisiana	Billy Napier	James Madison head coach	December 5, 2021	Hired by Florida	Michael Desormeaux (promoted on December 5)
Nevada	Jay Norvell	Colorado State head coach	December 6, 2021	Hired by Colorado State	Vai Taua (interim; bowl)
Oregon	Mario Cristobal	Miami (FL) head coach	December 6, 2021	Hired by Miami (FL)	Bryan McClendon (interim, bowl)
Miami (FL)	Manny Diaz	Duke head coach	December 6, 2021	Fired	Jess Simpson (interim; bowl)

=== End of season ===
This list includes coaching changes announced during the season that did not take effect until the end of the season.

Team	Outgoing coach	Date	Reason	Replacement	Previous position
Georgia Southern	Kevin Whitley (interim)	November 2, 2021	Permanent replacement	Clay Helton	USC head coach (2015-2021)
Texas Tech	Sonny Cumbie (interim)	November 8, 2021	Permanent replacement	Joey McGuire	Baylor assistant head coach/outside linebackers coach (2020-2021)
FIU	Butch Davis	November 10, 2021	Will not return after the 2021 season	Mike MacIntyre	Memphis defensive coordinator (2020-2021)
UConn	Lou Spanos (interim)	November 11, 2021	Permanent replacement	Jim Mora	UConn offensive assistant (2020-2021)
UMass	Alex Miller (interim)	November 21, 2021	Permanent replacement	Don Brown	Arizona defensive coordinator (2021)
Louisiana Tech	Skip Holtz	November 26, 2021	Fired	Sonny Cumbie	Texas Tech interim head coach, offensive coordinator and quarterbacks coach (2021)
TCU	Jerry Kill (interim)	November 26, 2021	Permanent replacement	Sonny Dykes	SMU head coach (2018-2021)
New Mexico State	Doug Martin	November 27, 2021	Fired	Jerry Kill	TCU interim head coach and assistant to head coach (2020-2021)
Duke	David Cutcliffe	November 28, 2021	Parted ways	Mike Elko	Texas A&M defensive coordinator (2018-2021)
Florida	Greg Knox (interim)	November 28, 2021	Permanent replacement	Billy Napier	Louisiana head coach (2018-2021)
USC	Donte Williams (interim)	November 28, 2021	Permanent replacement	Lincoln Riley	Oklahoma head coach (2017-2021)
SMU	Jim Leavitt (interim)	November 29, 2021	Permanent replacement	Rhett Lashlee	Miami (FL) offensive coordinator and quarterbacks coach (2020-2021)
Temple	Rod Carey	November 29, 2021	Fired	Stan Drayton	Texas assistant head coach, running backs coach and run game coordinator (2017-2021)
LSU	Brad Davis (interim)	November 29, 2021	Permanent replacement	Brian Kelly	Notre Dame head coach (2010-2021)
Washington	Bob Gregory (interim)	November 29, 2021	Permanent replacement	Kalen DeBoer	Fresno State head coach (2020-2021)
Virginia Tech	J. C. Price (interim)	November 30, 2021	Permanent replacement	Brent Pry	Penn State defensive coordinator (2016-2021)
Colorado State	Steve Addazio	December 2, 2021	Fired	Jay Norvell	Nevada head coach (2017-2021)
Virginia	Bronco Mendenhall	December 2, 2021	Resigned	Tony Elliott	Clemson assistant head coach and offensive coordinator (2020-2021)
Troy	Brandon Hall (interim)	December 2, 2021	Permanent replacement	Jon Sumrall	Kentucky co-defensive coordinator and linebackers coach (2020-2021)
Akron	Oscar Rodriguez (interim)	December 4, 2021	Permanent replacement	Joe Moorhead	Oregon offensive coordinator (2020-2021)
Oklahoma	Bob Stoops (interim; bowl)	December 5, 2021	Permanent replacement	Brent Venables	Clemson assistant head coach and defensive coordinator (2012-2021)
Miami (FL)	Jess Simpson (interim; bowl)	December 6, 2021	Permanent replacement	Mario Cristobal	Oregon head coach (2018-2021)
Fresno State	Lee Marks (interim; bowl)	December 8, 2021	Permanent replacement	Jeff Tedford	Fresno State head coach (2017-2019)
Nevada	Vai Taua (interim; bowl)	December 10, 2021	Permanent replacement	Ken Wilson	Oregon co-defensive coordinator and linebackers coach (2020-2021)
Oregon	Bryan McClendon (interim; bowl)	December 11, 2021	Permanent replacement	Dan Lanning	Georgia defensive coordinator (2019-2021)
Hawaiʻi	Todd Graham	January 14, 2022	Resigned	Timmy Chang	Nevada wide receivers coach (2021)

== Television viewers and ratings ==
=== Most watched regular season games ===
All times Eastern. Rankings are from the AP Poll (before 11/2) and CFP Rankings (thereafter).

Rank	Date	Time	Matchup				Network	Viewers (millions)	TV ratings	Significance
1	November 27	12:00 p.m.	No. 2 Ohio State	27	No. 5 Michigan	42	Fox	15.89	8.1	College GameDay, Big Noon Kickoff, rivalry
2	November 27	3:30 p.m.	No. 3 Alabama	24	Auburn	22	CBS	10.37	5.3	Iron Bowl
3	October 30	12:00 p.m.	No. 6 Michigan	33	No. 8 Michigan State	37	Fox	9.29	5.1	College GameDay, Big Noon Kickoff, rivalry
4	September 4	7:30 p.m.	No. 5 Georgia	10	No. 3 Clemson	3	ABC	8.86	4.6	College GameDay, rivalry
5	October 9	8:00 p.m.	No. 1 Alabama	38	Texas A&M	41	CBS	8.33	4.5	
6	September 18	3:30 p.m.	No. 1 Alabama	31	No. 11 Florida	29	CBS	7.86	4.2	rivalry
7	September 5	7:30 p.m.	No. 9 Notre Dame	41	Florida State	38	ABC	7.75	4.2	
8	September 11	12:00 p.m.	No. 12 Oregon	35	No. 3 Ohio State	28	Fox	7.73	4.3	Big Noon Kickoff
9	September 18	7:30 p.m.	No. 22 Auburn	20	No. 10 Penn State	28	ABC	7.61	4.1	College GameDay
10	December 11	3:00 p.m.	Army	13	Navy	17	CBS	7.58	4.2	College GameDay, Army–Navy Game

=== Conference championship games ===
All times Eastern. Rankings are from the CFP Rankings.

Rank	Date	Time	Matchup				Network	Viewers (millions)	TV ratings	Conference	Location
1	December 4	4:00 p.m.	No. 1 Georgia	24	No. 3 Alabama	41	CBS	15.27	8.2	SEC	Mercedes-Benz Stadium
2	December 4	8:00 p.m.	No. 2 Michigan	42	No. 13 Iowa	3	Fox	11.66	6.2	Big Ten	Lucas Oil Stadium
3	December 4	12:00 p.m.	No. 9 Baylor	21	No. 5 Oklahoma State	16	ABC	8.02	4.8	Big 12	AT&T Stadium
4	December 3	8:00 p.m.	No. 10 Oregon	10	No. 17 Utah	38	ABC	4.25	2.5	Pac-12	Allegiant Stadium
5	December 4	4:00 p.m.	No. 21 Houston	20	No. 4 Cincinnati	35	ABC	3.42	2.0	AAC	Nippert Stadium
6	December 4	8:00 p.m.	No. 15 Pittsburgh	45	No. 16 Wake Forest	21	ABC	2.66	1.5	ACC	Bank of America Stadium
7	December 4	12:00 p.m.	Kent State	23	Northern Illinois	41	ESPN	0.88	0.6	Mid-American	Ford Field
8	December 4	3:00 p.m.	Utah State	46	No. 19 San Diego State	13	Fox	0.82	0.5	MW	Dignity Health Sports Park
9	December 4	3:30 p.m.	Appalachian State	16	No. 24 Louisiana	24	ESPN	0.44	0.3	Sun Belt	Cajun Field
10	December 3	7:00 p.m.	Western Kentucky	41	UTSA	49	CBSSN	n.a	n.a.	C-USA	Alamodome

=== Most watched non-CFP bowl games ===
All times Eastern. Rankings are from the CFP Rankings.

Rank	Date	Matchup				Network	Viewers (millions)	TV ratings	Game	Location
1	January 1, 2022, 1:00 p.m.	No. 15 Iowa	17	No. 22 Kentucky	20	ABC	6.5	3.5	Citrus Bowl	Camping World Stadium, Orlando FL
2	December 30, 2021, 3:00 p.m.	Tennessee	45	Purdue	48	ESPN	5.6	3.1	Music City Bowl	Nissan Stadium, Nashville, TN
3	December 29, 2021, 5:45 p.m.	No. 19 Clemson	20	Iowa State	13	ESPN	4.9	2.8	Cheez-It Bowl	Camping World Stadium, Orlando FL
4	December 29, 2021, 9:15 p.m.	No. 14 Oregon	32	No. 16 Oklahoma	47	ESPN	4.7	2.7	Alamo Bowl	Alamodome, San Antonio, TX
5	January 1, 2022, 12:00 p.m.	Penn State	10	No. 21 Arkansas	24	ESPN2	3.9	2.2	Outback Bowl	Raymond James Stadium, Tampa, FL
6	December 28, 2021, 6:45 p.m	Mississippi State	7	Texas Tech	34	ESPN	3.9	2.3	Liberty Bowl	Liberty Bowl Memorial Stadium, Memphis, TN
7	December 30, 2021, 10:30 p.m.	Wisconsin	20	Arizona State	13	ESPN	3.6	1.8	Las Vegas Bowl	Allegiant Stadium, Las Vegas, NV
8	December 31, 2021, 11:00 a.m.	No. 17 Wake Forest	38	Rutgers	10	ESPN	3.5	2.1	Gator Bowl	TIAA Bank Field, Jacksonville, FL
9	December 18, 2021, 3:30 p.m.	UAB	31	No. 13 BYU	28	ABC	3.2	1.9	Independence Bowl	Independence Stadium, Shreveport, LA
10	December 23, 2021, 7:00 p.m.	UCF	29	Florida	17	ESPN	3.2	1.8	Gasparilla Bowl	Raymond James Stadium, Tampa, FL

=== New Year Six and College Football Playoff semifinal games ===
All times Eastern. Rankings are from the CFP Rankings.

Rank	Date	Time	Matchup				Network	Viewers (millions)	TV ratings	Game	Location
1	January 10, 2022	8:00 p.m.	No. 3 Georgia	33	No. 1 Alabama	18	ESPN	22.6	12.1	CFP National Championship	Lucas Oil Stadium, Indianapolis, IN
2	December 31, 2021	7:30 p.m.	No. 3 Georgia	34	No. 2 Michigan	11	ESPN	16.5	7.7	Orange Bowl (CFP Semifinal)	Hard Rock Stadium, Miami Gardens, FL
3	December 31, 2021	3:30 p.m.	No. 4 Cincinnati	6	No. 1 Alabama	27	ESPN	16.1	8.3	Cotton Bowl (CFP Semifinal)	AT&T Stadium, Arlington, TX
4	January 1, 2022	5:00 pm	No. 11 Utah	45	No. 6 Ohio State	48	ESPN	16.0	7.8	Rose Bowl	Rose Bowl, Pasadena, CA
5	January 1, 2022	8:45 p.m.	No. 8 Ole Miss	7	No. 7 Baylor	21	ESPN	9.5	5.0	Sugar Bowl	Caesars Superdome, New Orleans, LA
6	January 1, 2022	1:00 pm	No. 9 Oklahoma State	37	No. 5 Notre Dame	35	ESPN	8.0	4.2	Fiesta Bowl	State Farm Stadium, Glendale, AZ
7	December 30, 2021	7:00 pm	No. 12 Pittsburgh	21	No. 10 Michigan State	31	ESPN	7.6	4.0	Peach Bowl	Mercedes-Benz Stadium, Atlanta, GA

== Attendances ==
Average home attendance top 10:

Rank	Team	Average
1	Michigan Wolverines	108,763
2	Penn State Nittany Lions	106,799
3	Alabama Crimson Tide	98,720
4	Texas A&M Aggies	98,407
5	Ohio State Buckeyes	96,756
6	LSU Tigers	94,808
7	Georgia Bulldogs	92,746
8	Texas Longhorns	91,938
9	Tennessee Volunteers	86,386
10	Nebraska Cornhuskers	86,173

== See also ==
- 2021 NCAA Division I FCS football season
- 2021 NCAA Division II football season
- 2021 NCAA Division III football season
- 2021 NAIA football season
- 2021 U Sports football season
