= Tommy Restivo =

American football coach

Biographical details
- Born: Toledo, Ohio, U.S.

Playing career
- 20??–2006: Georgetown (KY)
- Position: Linebacker

Coaching career (HC unless noted)
- 2007: Marshall (GA)
- 2008–2009: Florida (DQC)
- 2010–2011: Louisville (DQC)
- 2012–2013: Louisville (DB)
- 2014–2015: South Carolina State (DC/DB)
- 2016: McNeese State (DC)
- 2017: South Carolina State (DC)
- 2018: South Florida (S)
- 2019: UMass (Co-DC/LB)
- 2020–2021: UMass (DC/LB)

Tommy Restivo is an American football coach and former player. He was the defensive coordinator at the University of Massachusetts Amherst.

== Playing career ==
Restivo lettered at linebacker while playing for the Tigers of Georgetown College, graduating in 2006.

== Coaching career ==
=== Early coaching career ===
Following his playing career, Restivo joined the coaching staff at Marshall as a graduate assistant for the 2007 season. In 2008 and 2009, he was a defensive quality control coach at Florida, working for defensive coordinator Charlie Strong. They won the BCS National Championship in 2009. In 2010, when Strong was hired as the head coach at Louisville, Restivo followed him. He worked as a defensive quality control coach in 2010 and 2011, before being promoted to defensive backs coach in 2012 and 2013.

=== FCS experience ===
From 2014 through 2017, Restivo was a defensive coordinator at the FCS level. In 2014 and 2015, he was the defensive coordinator on Buddy Pough at South Carolina State. His defenses here ranked in the top 10 in the FCS multiple categories. In 2016, Restivo joined Lance Guidry’s staff at McNeese State as the defensive coordinator, before returning to South Carolina State in 2017. He again served as the defensive coordinator.

=== South Florida ===
In 2018, Restivo reunited with Charlie Strong when he joined the staff at South Florida as the safeties coach. That season, he helped coach a defense that forced 22 turnovers.

=== UMass ===
For the 2019 season, Restivo joined new head coach Walt Bell’s staff at UMass as the co-defensive coordinator and linebackers coach. Restivo was fired along with Walt Bell on November 7.

== Personal life ==
Restivo is from Plainfield, IN. He graduated with a degree in Kinesiology.
