= Walt Bell =

American football player and coach (born 1984)

Current position
- Title: Offensive coordinator & quarterbacks coach
- Team: Western Michigan
- Conference: MAC

Biographical details
- Born: June 7, 1984 (age 42); Dickson, Tennessee, U.S.

Playing career
- 2003–2006: Middle Tennessee
- Position: Wide receiver

Coaching career (HC unless noted)
- 2007: Louisiana–Lafayette (GA)
- 2007–2008: Memphis (GA)
- 2009: Oklahoma State (QC)
- 2010: Southern Miss (GA)
- 2011: Southern Miss (WR)
- 2012–2013: North Carolina (TE/RC)
- 2014–2015: Arkansas State (AHC/OC/QB)
- 2016–2017: Maryland (OC/QB)
- 2018: Florida State (OC/QB)
- 2019–2021: UMass
- 2022–2023: Indiana (OC/QB)
- 2024–present: Western Michigan (OC/QB)

Head coaching record
- Overall: 2–23

Walter A. Bell IV (born June 7, 1984) is an American college football coach and former wide receiver. He is the offensive coordinator and quarterbacks coach for Western Michigan University, positions he has held since 2024. He was the head coach for the UMass Minutemen from 2019 until 2021. He played college football at Middle Tennessee for coach Andy McCollum from 2003 to 2006. He then served as offensive coordinator and quarterbacks coach for the Florida State Seminoles, Maryland Terrapins, Indiana Hoosiers, and Arkansas State Red Wolves.

== Playing career ==
Bell was born in Dickson, Tennessee, to Walter "Butch" Bell and Jane Harper. Walter, like his father and grandfather, was a physician. Walt's parents separated within a year; he was raised by Walter and Walter's second wife, Mary, whom Walter married when Walt was in elementary school. While Walt was in middle school he got to know Luke and Tyler Paschall; the two brothers eventually moved in with the Bell family.

Bell played quarterback at Dickson County High School; one of his targets was Luke Paschall, playing wide receiver. Both attended Middle Tennessee State University, after which their paths would diverge for a few years. Bell played wide receiver and special teams for four years at Middle Tennessee State University, from 2003 to 2006. He graduated in 2005 with a bachelor's degree in criminal justice administration and in 2006 with a master's degree in sport management.

== Coaching career ==
Bell got his start in coaching from Blake Anderson, who had been his position coach at Middle Tennessee and had just become the offensive coordinator at Louisiana–Lafayette under Rickey Bustle. Bell spent the spring of 2007 at Louisiana–Lafayette as a graduate assistant before moving on to the University of Memphis for the fall season under Tommy West.

In 2009, Bell and Paschall were reunited for a year at Oklahoma State, where both served as quality control coaches on Mike Gundy's staff. After the 2009 season, Bell departed to become a graduate assistant at Southern Miss under Larry Fedora. The move reunited him with Blake Anderson, who had been on the staff since 2008 and had just been promoted to offensive coordinator. In 2011 he was promoted to wide receivers coach. Fedora left Southern Miss at the end of the season to become the head coach at the University of North Carolina (UNC) and took a number of assistants with him, including Anderson and Bell. At UNC, Bell coached tight ends and had the title of recruiting coordinator. One tight end he coached was future National Football League first-round draft pick Eric Ebron. Paschall, most recently a graduate assistant at Ole Miss, also joined the staff as a GA.

After the 2013 season, Blake Anderson accepted the head coaching job at Arkansas State University. Anderson took several UNC assistants with him, including Bell and Paschall. At Arkansas State, Bell served as offensive coordinator. After two successful years there, Bell was in demand. After turning down the head coaching job at the University of Louisiana at Monroe, he accepted the offensive coordinator position at the University of Maryland under D. J. Durkin. After two years at Maryland, Bell moved on to Florida State University, joining new head coach Willie Taggart's staff as offensive coordinator.

Following a single season at Florida State, Bell departed to become a head coach for the first time, at the University of Massachusetts Amherst. Among his coaching staff hires was Luke Paschall, as assistant head coach and special teams coordinator. UMass fired Bell toward the end of the 2021 season. Over nearly three seasons, Bell posted an overall record of 2–23.

On December 9, 2021, Bell was announced as the new offensive coordinator and quarterbacks coach at Indiana. Bell was fired after the fifth game of the 2023 season.

== Head coaching record ==
Year	Team	Overall	Conference	Standing	Bowl/playoffs
UMass Minutemen (NCAA Division I FBS independent) (2019–2021)
2019	UMass	1–11			
2020	UMass	0–4			
2021	UMass	1–8 (Note: UMass fired Bell with three games remaining)			
UMass:		2–23			
Total:		2–23			
