= Lamarr Wilson =

American technology journalist and YouTuber (1977–2025)

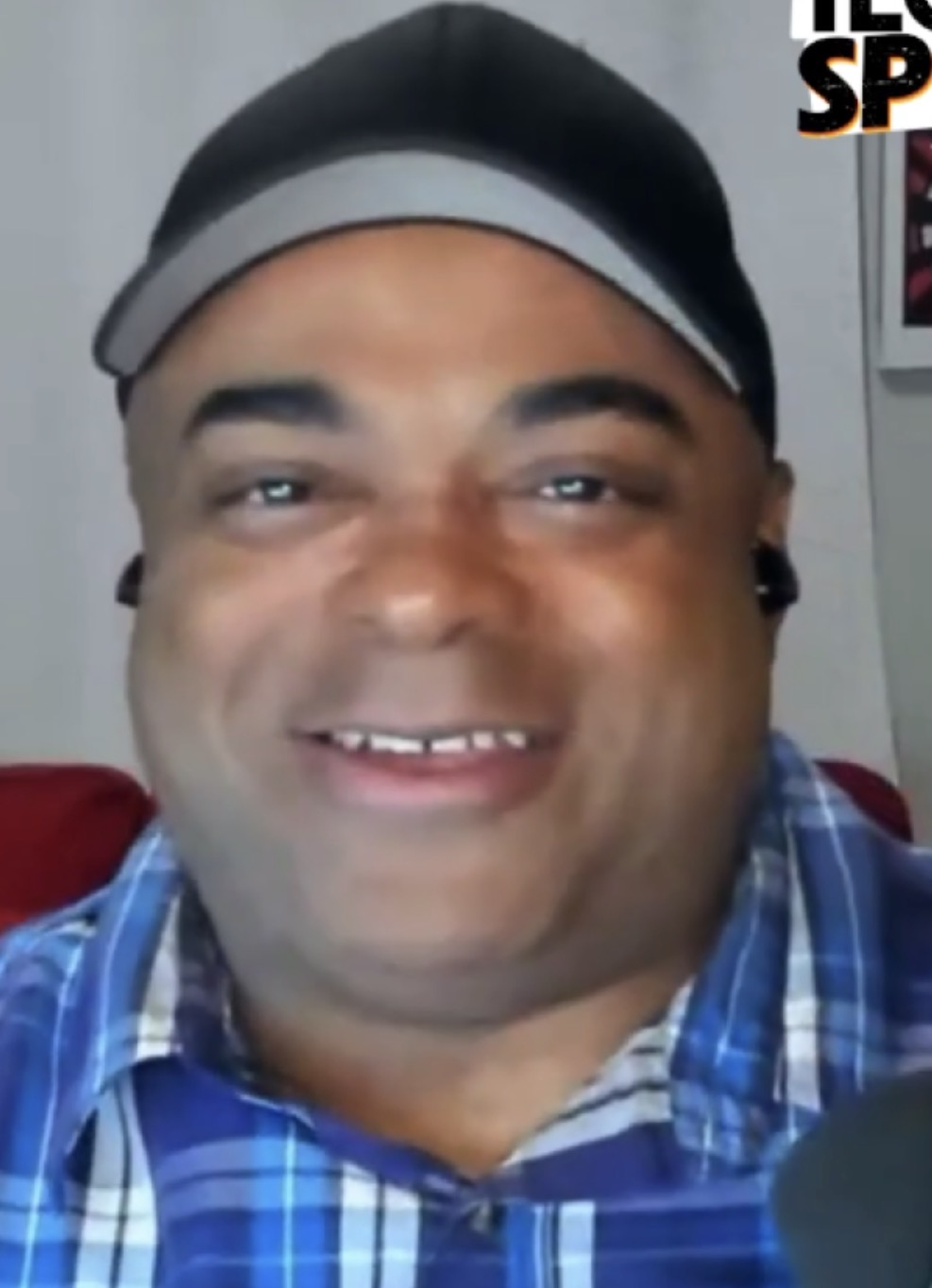
- Wilson during an appearance on the Techsploder podcast, June 2024
- Born: October 22, 1977; Chicago, Illinois, U.S.
- Died: November 21, 2025 (aged 48); Los Angeles, California, U.S.
- Awards: Webby Award (People's Voice, 2014)

YouTube information
- Channel: Lamarr Wilson
- Years active: 2008–2025
- Genres: Technology; Unboxing; Comedy; Vlog
- Subscribers: 2.13 million
- Views: 314 million
- Last updated: April 23rd, 2026
- Website: lamarrwilson.com (archived)

Lamarr Wilson (/ləˈmɑːr ˈwɪlsən/ luh-MAR-WIL-sən; October 22, 1977 – November 21, 2025) was an American YouTuber, technology journalist, and educator. He produced product reviews and "unboxing" videos for consumer electronics across a seventeen-year career, amassing 2.23 million subscribers on YouTube and over one million followers across TikTok and Instagram. Before his media career, Wilson worked as a technology coordinator for the Chicago Public Schools system and founded an educational technology consulting firm; Inc. magazine observed that this background shaped his on-camera approach, as he used non-technical language to address general audiences rather than enthusiasts.

Wilson created his YouTube channel in 2008, initially posting vlogs before transitioning to product testing. His coverage of Nintendo products and "lifestyle" technology reviews led to collaborations with companies, including Microsoft, Google and Nintendo. In 2013, he co-hosted the premiere episode of the web series Takei's Take alongside actor George Takei; the episode, sponsored by the AARP, won a People's Voice Webby Award in 2014 in the "Online Film & Video: Technology" category. He contributed to multiple media platforms, hosting series for Mashable and TWiT.tv, contributing to the Daily Tech News Show podcast for ten years, and appearing as a featured creator at industry events including VidCon and Summer Game Fest. During the 2020 George Floyd protests, Wilson also used his platform to address racial inequity in technology and media.

Later in his career, Wilson transitioned to short-form content, including TikTok and YouTube Shorts. Wilson died at age 48 by suicide at his home in Los Angeles in November 2025; his family withheld the announcement until the following month. At the time of his death, he was negotiating new media contracts and had been selected to judge the 2026 CES Innovation Awards. His death drew tributes from figures across the gaming and technology industries, while commentators in outlets such as The Root and Livemint analyzed his death within the context of a mental health crisis affecting African American men and the psychological pressures associated with managing a public persona online.

== Life and career ==
=== Early life and education ===
Lamarr Wilson was born on October 22, 1977, in Chicago, Illinois. Growing up as a "latchkid" without a home computer, Wilson read his mother's World Book Encyclopedia cover-to-cover. He attended high school from 1991 to 1995, where editing the student newspaper provided his first direct computer access. He spent his lunch periods studying operating systems in the campus computer lab and later accepted a senior-year work-study position at Best Buy. After graduating, Wilson worked as a technology coordinator for K–8 public schools in Milwaukee and for the Chicago Public Schools system.

In 2004, he founded Chess in Chicago to promote scholastic competition, serving as the organization's webmaster and state tournament photographer. To better engage younger players, he framed the strategy game as a "war game," a teaching method he detailed in a Chicago Tribune interview. He left the school district in 2006 to pursue independent tech consulting, founding and serving as president of Wilson EduTech, Inc., a consulting firm helping teachers integrate classroom technology. Through his new firm, he continued his work with CPS until 2011 by co-coordinating technology for the Striving Readers Initiative, a five-year federal grant program spanning 50 schools.

=== 2008–2012: YouTube beginnings ===
Wilson brought his background in alternative teaching methods to online media after attending a workshop on social media video production. He created his YouTube channel under the username "WilsonTech1" in 2008, framing it as "an antidote to summer boredom and a tutorial on video editing." Filmed in his apartment, his initial uploads consisted of vlogs documenting his daily life and his work as a technology coordinator. Over the first two years, he built what he characterized as a "modest following" with videos focusing on education and technology. His educational background later influenced his presentation style on YouTube; Inc. magazine observed that Wilson addressed general audiences using non-technical language rather than targeting technology enthusiasts.

He subsequently transitioned to "unboxing" content—recording the moment a product is removed from its packaging—under the moniker "That Unboxing Guy". His videos featured consumer electronics, video games, and snack foods, ranging from the latest iPhone models to Loot Crate mystery boxes and Oreo cookies. His reviews occasionally featured unconventional demonstrations; Atlas Obscura noted a video in which he used a baseball bat to test a travel mug's suction.

In May 2012, YouTube selected Wilson as one of sixteen creators for its "Next Vlogger" program, which provided $15,000 in funding—split between $5,000 worth of video equipment and $10,000 in promotional support—and mentorship from established content creators including iJustine. Combined, the sixteen selected channels had together accumulated more than 125 million views before entering the program. That October, Wilson participated in the bi-annual Supernote Challenge, a community competition organized by the YouTube creators Rhett and Link in which participants competed to hold a single vocal note for the longest duration; Wilson was one of several notable vloggers serving as team captains that year alongside others including Felicia Day and iJustine. Wilson decided to pursue content creation full-time and relocated to Los Angeles later that year, where he remained until his death.

=== 2013–2019: Hosting, Takei's Take and channel breakthrough ===
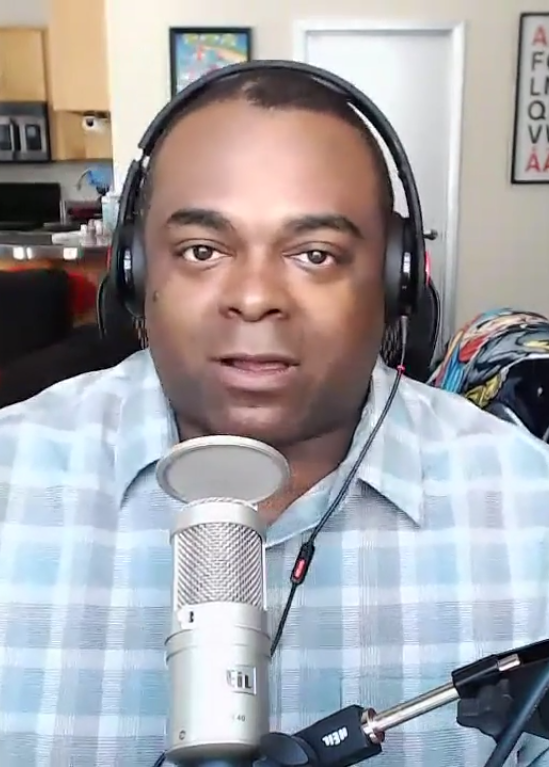
Wilson on the Daily Tech News Show podcast, June 2014

In March 2013, Wilson partnered with TWiT.tv network founder Leo Laporte to co-host This Week in YouTube. The program covered platform news, viral video analysis, and channel recommendations. According to producer Chad Johnson, TWiT hired Wilson to help the network attract his existing YouTube audience. Other outlets sought his analysis on platform updates, including The Daily Dot, which published his February 2013 commentary on the rumored introduction of paid channel subscriptions.

Later that year, the production companies Fullscreen and Portal A cast Wilson as co-host for the premiere of Takei's Take, a short-form web series led by Star Trek actor George Takei. The AARP sponsored the show, which Portal A filmed primarily at YouTube Space LA. The series taught older adults about new technology and encouraged a positive attitude toward modern gadgets. In the September 2013 premiere, Wilson and Takei demonstrated Google Glass; they analyzed the $1,500 device's photo and search capabilities while noting downsides like pedestrian distraction. The episode received 25,000 views in its first day, leading USA Today to describe him as acting in a "tech reporter" capacity. In 2014, the episode won a People's Voice Webby Award in the "Online Film & Video: Technology" category. Around the same time, Wilson co-hosted Shira Lazar's web series What's Trending, hosted two video series for Mashable—YouTube Weekly and Socially Awkward—and began a ten-year period contributing to the Daily Tech News Show podcast.

Wilson began reviewing limited-edition Nintendo products in late 2014. Inc. identified his coverage of the company's Amiibo toys-to-life figures as the "a-ha moment" that helped his channel's growth. The magazine noted that his unboxing style—which he described as "ripping them out like a 6-year-old kid"—resonated with audiences in a way his more measured earlier videos had not. His subscriber base grew from 200,000 to 700,000 during this period, leading to partnerships with Microsoft, including its Xbox brand. Atomix featured his unboxing of the Gold Mario Amiibo from Mario Party 10, describing the destruction of one of only 3,000 units produced worldwide as likely distressing to collectors.

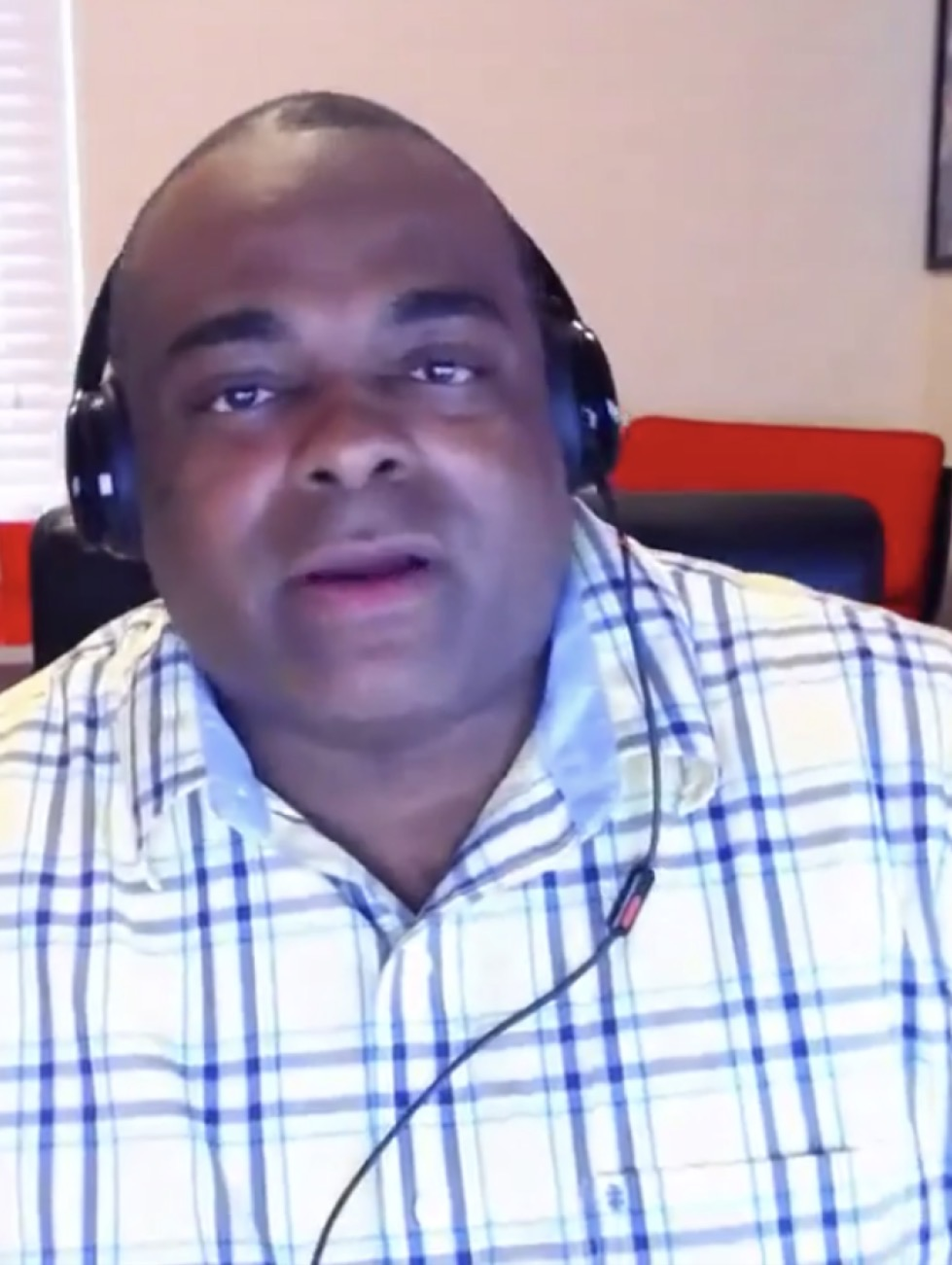
Wilson on the Daily Tech News Show podcast, February 2017.

By 2016, Wilson maintained a production schedule of five videos per week and had reached nearly one million subscribers, incorporating "casual vlogging" and real-life interactions alongside product reviews. His casual content ranged from a viral hoverboard clip (2.5 million views) to footage of everyday outings, including errands and casual meals. In describing this evolution, Wilson told Inc. that "people are really into the reality format on YouTube. They like stories. They just want to know what you're doing with your life." The Indian financial publication Mint cited his demonstration of a levitating Bluetooth speaker as a factor in the device's popularity as an American holiday gift.

Following Microsoft's August 2017 Gamescom presentation, the company provided Wilson with an Xbox One X Project Scorpio Edition. According to 3DJuegos, he conducted the console's first consumer unboxing, with Microsoft representatives present throughout. That January, Wilson posted a reaction video to Nintendo's Nintendo Switch reveal; it drew 852,000 views and 19,000 likes, the second-highest figure for that event among the YouTube creators analyzed in Université du Québec à Montréal communications researcher Patrick Deslauriers's 2024 doctoral study of the console's pre-launch period, which placed Wilson among the creators Nintendo used to generate consumer demand before the March 2017 release. The Argentine newspaper Mendoza Post reported his channel's reach into South American demographics after a 2017 video of him reviewing regional sweets went viral locally.

=== 2020–2025: Later career and advocacy ===
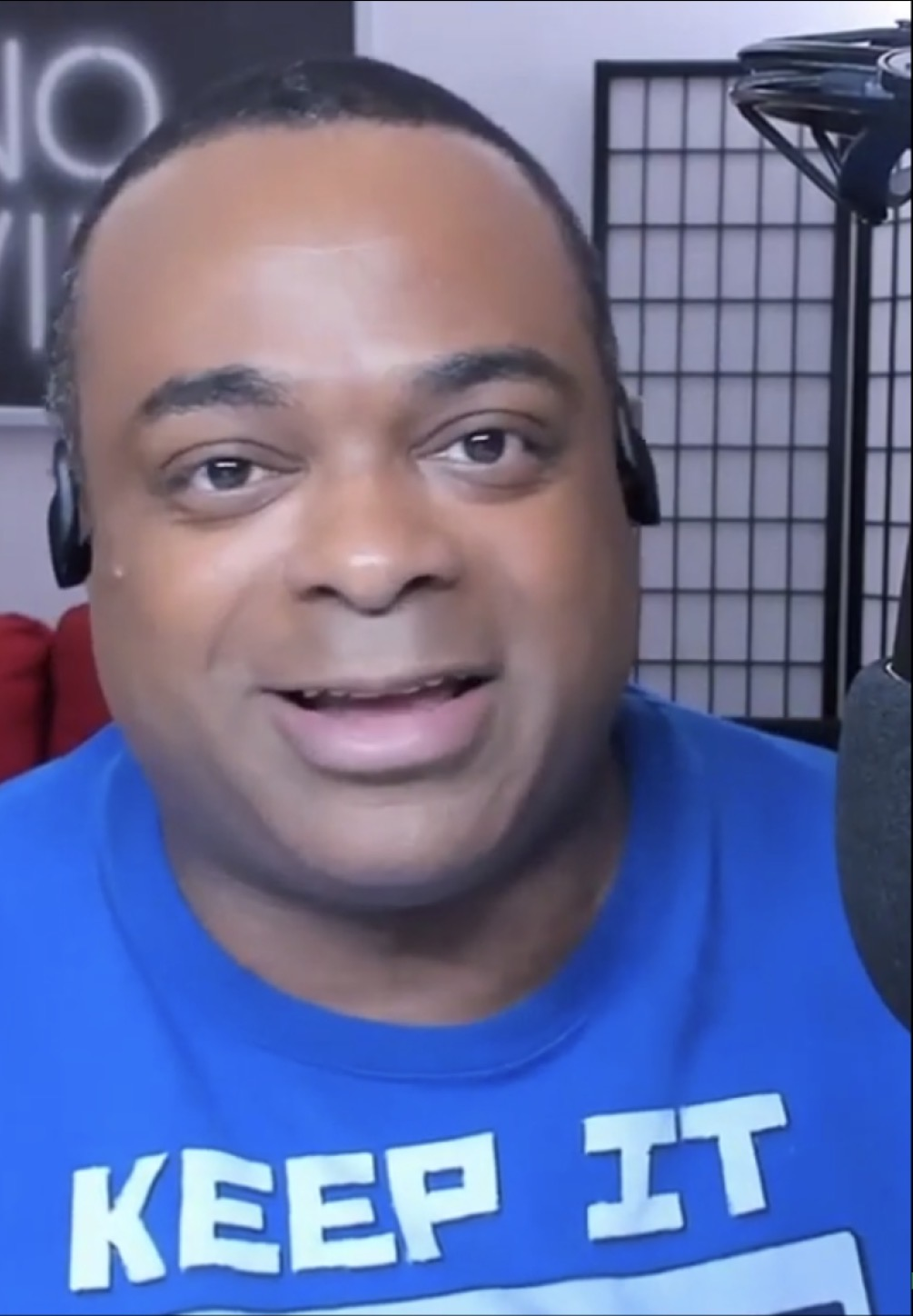
Wilson on the Daily Tech News Show podcast, January 2020

During the George Floyd protests in June 2020, Wilson used his platform to address racial inequity within the media and technology industries. In a video published that month, he stated, "No one's asking for black people to be treated above you, just a level playing field," according to KTLA. Following the protests, the website TechRadar listed him as a creator to follow to support black voices in technology. He subsequently appeared at industry events as a featured creator. He appeared on the Xbox Games Showcase pre-show on July 23, 2020, alongside creators such as Jacksepticeye, Alanah Pearce, and MatPat, offering his reactions and insights on upcoming Microsoft announcements. That same year, he appeared as a guest for the Summer Game Fest with Geoff Keighley, participating in YouTube Gaming's exclusive programming for the digital event, which featured Wilson and other creators sharing "PlayStation memories" before Sony's PlayStation 5 reveal.

In 2021, Wilson changed his video format to prioritize short-form vertical video on platforms such as TikTok, Instagram and YouTube Shorts. Black Enterprise journalist Nahlah Abdur-Rahman noted that as Wilson grew his presence to these platforms, his videos generated discussions about how new technology practically served everyday consumers. Brands continued to supply him with promotional hardware for his content during this period; he received a custom Xbox Series X mini-fridge associated with actor Dwayne Johnson in March 2021, and was provided with hardware from Apple's 2023 "Scary Fast" event. In June 2025, The Hollywood Reporter named Wilson one of "11 Influencers You Need to Know," noting his scheduled speaking appearance as part of VidCon's initiative to feature educational creators. That December, the Consumer Technology Association selected Wilson to serve as a judge for the 2026 CES Innovation Awards, scheduled to take place in Las Vegas in January. Wilson has amassed 2.23 million subscribers on YouTube and over one million followers across TikTok and Instagram.

Wilson documented his personal health in late 2025. On October 22, he posted a photo on Instagram detailing a 48 lb (22 kg) weight loss following a "health scare." He wrote that he shed the weight "naturally" through discipline and felt "genuinely at peace." Wilson also advised his followers to remove people "determined to disrupt [his life] with their inner chaos," concluding the post with a final message to his audience: "I'll see you in the video!" Shortly after, Wilson attended an event for creators hosted by Forbes Creator Upfronts in Los Angeles.

Concern arose in mid-November 2025 when Wilson's audience noticed he had stopped his usual schedule of multiple weekly updates; his final video, a review of Belkin charging stations, was uploaded nine days before his death on November 12.

On November 21, 2025, Wilson was found dead at his home in Los Angeles; he was 48. The Los Angeles County Department of Medical Examiner-Coroner ruled the cause of death as asphyxia and suffocation. His family withheld the announcement for three weeks. On December 13, his uncle Tony Wilson issued a statement on Facebook confirming the death; he noted that Wilson had been actively negotiating new media contracts at the time and that those projects would have represented further process in his career. The family described Wilson as the "go-to member" of the family and thanked his audience for their support.

== Content and reception ==
=== Presentation style and audience ===
The camera is the biggest bullshit detector.

— Wilson, speaking to Cult of Mac on the importance of authenticity in reviews. (2016)

Wilson's style differed from that of technical reviewers; critics described him as a "lifestyle" technology reporter who prioritized entertainment and accessibility over detailed technical analyses. Marli Guzzetta of Inc. wrote that while creators like Marques Brownlee focused on detailed specifications, Wilson used "organic excitement" to appeal to casual consumers, creating a dynamic where viewers felt they were "hanging out with him after a trip to the store". Black Enterprise journalist Nahlah Abdur-Rahman noted that as Wilson grew his presence to these platforms, his videos generated discussions about how new technology practically served everyday consumers. To maintain viewer interest, Wilson deliberately withheld certain details during unboxings and incorporated elements of "mystery". He described his on-camera persona as an "ex-Apple hater" who had overcome "a morbid fear of things that are easy to use."

His presentation style was characterized by a "playful sense of humor" and "unvarnished opinions"; The Hollywood Reporter noted that this approach allowed him to function as an "original" voice in a saturated market who balanced serious content with fun. In a 2016 analysis of what children were watching on YouTube, Caroline Knorr of HuffPost observed that Wilson used an "engaging personality to entertain families," differentiating his channel through the inclusion of skits, taste tests, and "awkward questions". Inc. reported that his primary audience demographics were men aged 25 to 34, though Wilson was aware of a substantial viewership among children, noting that underage viewers frequently misreported their ages on platform accounts.

Wilson described his approach to viewers who "live vicariously" through unboxing content, acknowledging that many commenters could not afford to purchase the products he featured. He stated in 2016: "They love seeing me unbox, because they don't see it as bragging." Through his commercial partnerships, he received free products via formal influencer programs with manufacturers, a policy he publicly disclosed to maintain audience trust. Following his death, Livemint described him as a "leading voice in the technology lifestyle space" who had built a reputation as a "trusted online host" through accessible content.

=== Legacy and influence ===
In a retrospective following Wilson's death, PC World's Hungarian edition described him as a "defining online personality" of YouTube's early era and credited his nickname "That Unboxing Guy" with becoming a "trademark" for the unboxing genre before it achieved mainstream recognition as a genre; the magazine reported that fellow creators praised his "directness, helpfulness, and infectious sense of humor" within the creator community. Fans and outlets including Black Enterprise and the New York Daily News referred to him as the "Tech Lifestyle Entertainer."

Some members of the technology community noted being influenced by Wilson. Fellow creator Austin Evans stated in a tribute video that Wilson was instrumental in his own transition from technical specification-focused reviews toward a more personality-centered videos. Xbox executive Aaron Greenberg, describing Wilson as a longtime friend, acknowledged his ability to make complex technology understandable and announced a donation to the American Foundation for Suicide Prevention in his honor. The Game Awards creator Geoff Keighley and the Consumer Technology Association also issued statements acknowledging Wilson's role within the gaming and technology creator community and his contributions to industry events.

Livemint reported that Wilson's death brought "renewed attention to the pressures faced by high-profile digital creators," noting the "unseen mental and emotional strain" associated with maintaining an upbeat public persona. Writing for The Root, Lawrence Ware placed Wilson's death within the context of a "mental health crisis" affecting Black men in 2025, citing a 25.2% increase in suicide rates among the demographic between 2018 and 2023, and listing Wilson alongside other figures—including DJ Commando and Kyren Lacy—who died by suicide that year.

== Selected videography ==
Selected videos and online appearances
Year	Title	Role	Notes	Ref.
2013	Takei's Take (Episode 1)	Co-host	Series for AARP; winner of Webby Award (2014)	
2013	This Week in YouTube	Host	Series for TWiT.tv	
2014	YouTube Weekly	Host/Producer	Series for Mashable	
2013–2014	Socially Awkward	Host	Series for Mashable	
2020	Summer Game Fest	Guest	"PlayStation Memories" panel	
2020	Xbox Games Showcase	Guest	Official Microsoft event	

== Awards and nominations ==
Awards received by Wilson
Year	Organization	Category	Work	Result	Ref.
2014	Webby Awards	Online Film & Video: Technology	Takei's Take (with George Takei)	People's Voice	

== See also ==
- List of YouTubers
- Suicide in the United States
