= 2021 Louisiana–Monroe Warhawks football team =

American college football season

2021 Louisiana–Monroe Warhawks football
- Conference: Sun Belt Conference
- West Division
- Record: 4–8 (2–6 Sun Belt)
- Head coach: Terry Bowden (1st season)
- Offensive coordinator: Rich Rodriguez (1st season)
- Offensive scheme: Spread option
- Defensive coordinator: Zac Alley (1st season)
- Base defense: Multiple 4–2–5
- Home stadium: Malone Stadium

2021 Sun Belt Conference football standings
	Conf.			Overall
Team	W		L	W		L
East Division
Appalachian State xy	7	–	1	10	–	4
Georgia State	6	–	2	8	–	5
Coastal Carolina	6	–	2	11	–	2
Troy	3	–	5	5	–	7
Georgia Southern	2	–	6	3	–	9
West Division
No. 16 Louisiana xy$	8	–	0	13	–	1
Texas State	3	–	5	4	–	8
Louisiana–Monroe	2	–	6	4	–	8
South Alabama	2	–	6	5	–	7
Arkansas State	1	–	7	2	–	10
Championship: Louisiana 24, Appalachian State 16
$ – Conference champion; x – Division champion/co-champions; y – Championship game participant; Rankings from AP Poll

The 2021 Louisiana–Monroe Warhawks football team represented the University of Louisiana at Monroe in the 2021 NCAA Division I FBS football season. The Warhawks played their home games at Malone Stadium in Monroe, Louisiana, and competed in the West Division of the Sun Belt Conference. They were led by first-year head coach Terry Bowden.

== Preseason ==
=== Recruiting class ===
College recruiting
Name	Hometown	School	Height	Weight	40^{‡}	Commit date
Brett Drillette; DE	Weatherford, TX	Brock HS	6 ft 3 in (1.91 m)	215 lb (98 kg)	–	Dec 16, 2020
Brett Drillette; DE	Recruit ratings: Scout: Rivals: 247Sports: ESPN:					
James Gillespie; DT	Woodbridge, VA	Bishop Ireton HS	6 ft 2 in (1.88 m)	260 lb (120 kg)	–	Dec 16, 2020
James Gillespie; DT	Recruit ratings: Scout: Rivals: 247Sports: ESPN:					
David Godsey Jr. CB	Mansfield, TX	Mansfield HS	5 ft 11 in (1.80 m)	175 lb (79 kg)	–	Dec 16, 2020
David Godsey Jr. CB	Recruit ratings: Scout: Rivals: 247Sports: ESPN:					
D'Juan Grant; CB	New Caney, TX	New Caney HS	5 ft 10 in (1.78 m)	172 lb (78 kg)	–	Dec 16, 2020
D'Juan Grant; CB	Recruit ratings: Scout: Rivals: 247Sports: ESPN:					
Rylan Green; TE	West Monroe, LA	West Monroe HS	6 ft 3 in (1.91 m)	245 lb (111 kg)	–	Dec 16, 2020
Rylan Green; TE	Recruit ratings: Scout: Rivals: 247Sports: ESPN:					
Justin Kimber; WR	Arlington, TX	Mansfield Timberview HS	6 ft 3 in (1.91 m)	180 lb (82 kg)	–	Dec 16, 2020
Justin Kimber; WR	Recruit ratings: Scout: Rivals: 247Sports: ESPN:					
Justin Macias; S	Houston, TX	Hempstead HS	6 ft 1 in (1.85 m)	205 lb (93 kg)	–	Dec 16, 2020
Justin Macias; S	Recruit ratings: Scout: Rivals: 247Sports: ESPN:					
Caymen Mills; CB	Green Run, VA	Green Run HS	6 ft 0 in (1.83 m)	173 lb (78 kg)	–	Dec 16, 2020
Caymen Mills; CB	Recruit ratings: Scout: Rivals: 247Sports: ESPN:					
Zach Shaw; QB	Monroe, LA	Ouachita Parish HS	6 ft 3 in (1.91 m)	215 lb (98 kg)	–	Dec 16, 2020
Zach Shaw; QB	Recruit ratings: Scout: Rivals: 247Sports: ESPN:					
Hunter Smith; RB	Little Rock, AR	Joe T. Robinson HS	6 ft 0 in (1.83 m)	180 lb (82 kg)	–	Dec 16, 2020
Hunter Smith; RB	Recruit ratings: Scout: Rivals: 247Sports: ESPN:					
James Smith; DE	Virginia Beach, VA	Princess Anne HS	6 ft 3 in (1.91 m)	230 lb (100 kg)	–	Dec 16, 2020
James Smith; DE	Recruit ratings: Scout: Rivals: 247Sports: ESPN:					
Kenard Snyder; LB	Palm Bay, FL	Rockledge HS	6 ft 1 in (1.85 m)	220 lb (100 kg)	–	Dec 16, 2020
Kenard Snyder; LB	Recruit ratings: Scout: Rivals: 247Sports: ESPN:					
Dariyan Wiley; WR	Atlanta, GA	Douglas County HS; UMass	6 ft 0 in (1.83 m)	190 lb (86 kg)	–	Dec 16, 2020
Dariyan Wiley; WR	Recruit ratings: Scout: Rivals: 247Sports: ESPN:					
Fitzroy Gardner; DE	Tampa, FL	Armwood HS; Iowa Western CC	6 ft 7 in (2.01 m)	280 lb (130 kg)	–	Feb 3, 2021
Fitzroy Gardner; DE	Recruit ratings: Scout: Rivals: 247Sports: ESPN:					
Andrew Henry; RB	Dallas, TX	Allen HS; Trinity Valley CC	5 ft 10 in (1.78 m)	185 lb (84 kg)	–	Feb 3, 2021
Andrew Henry; RB	Recruit ratings: Scout: Rivals: 247Sports: ESPN:					
Rhett Rodriguez; QB	Tucson, AZ	Catalina Foothills HS; Arizona	6 ft 0 in (1.83 m)	195 lb (88 kg)	–	Feb 3, 2021
Rhett Rodriguez; QB	Recruit ratings: Scout: Rivals: 247Sports: ESPN:					

=== Sun Belt coaches poll ===
The Sun Belt coaches poll was released on July 20, 2021. The Warhawks were picked to finish fifth in the West Division.

== Personnel ==
2021 Louisiana–Monroe Warhawks football team roster
Players
Coaches
Offense

Pos.	#	Name	Class
RB	1	Javin Myers	Jr
WR	2	Malik Jackson	So
RB	3	Isaiah Phillips	So
QB	4	Rhett Rodriguez	Jr
WR	5	Jevin Frett	Jr
QB	6	Hayes Crockett	Fr
QB	6	Chandler Rogers	Fr
WR	7	Zach Johnson	Jr
WR	9	CJ Fletchr	Jr
QB	10	Jeremy Hunt	Jr
QB	12	Garrett Kahmann	Fr
QB	13	Garrett Hable	So
WR	14	Perry Carter Jr.	Jr
QB	16	Colby Suits	So
WR	17	Jahquan Bloomfield	So
WR	18	Jonathan Hodoh	Sr
WR	19	Coby Cavil	Fr
RB	21	Jakyle Holmes	Jr
RB	22	Zach Martin	Fr
RB	24	Kadyn Roach	Fr
TE	27	Jordan Crumpton	Fr
TE	33	Brock Booker	So
RB	34	Dallas Reagor	Fr
RB	45	Zach Murphy	Fr
RB	46	Charlie Norman	Fr
G	50	Fabian Pickering	So
G	51	Zach Breaux	So
C	57	Garrett Hirsch	Sr
OT	59	Victor Cutler	Sr
G	65	Dakota Torbert	Jr
OT	66	Peyton Dunn	Fr
OT	70	Blake Lodes	So
C	72	Avante Burnham	Fr
C	73	Dillon Brooks	So
OT	74	Evan Henry	Fr
G	75	John Bolding	So
G	76	Conner Parsons	So
OT	78	Nate Heidecker	Fr
WR	80	Will Derrick	Jr
WR	81	Jordan Carroll	So
TE	82	Zach Rasmussen	Jr
WR	83	Trey Williams	Fr
WR	84	Jahmeel Rice	Fr
TE	85	Donavon Hickman	Jr
WR	86	Justin Kimber	Fr
TE	87	Noah Patty	Fr
WR	88	Dariyan Wiley	Fr
TE	89	Cameron Darling	Jr

Defense

Pos.	#	Name	Class
S	1	Tyler Glass	Sr
S	2	Jabari Johnson	So
LB	4	Bobby Bell	So
CB	5	Kevric Wiggins	Fr
S	6	Keilos Swinney	Sr
LB	7	Keyshawn Johnson	So
DE	8	Myles Cole	So
CB	9	Jordan Oliver	So
LB	10	Traveion Webster	Sr
CB	12	Kenderick Marbles	Jr
CB	13	D. J. Travis	Jr
S	15	Austin Hawley	Sr
CB	20	Josh Newton	So
S	23	Tavier Williams	Fr
DE	25	Brandon Nettles	So
S	26	Tre Odom	Fr
CB	28	Kevin Jones	So
S	30	Keydrain Calligan	Fr
S	32	Zac Gulley	Fr
LB	35	Taylor Behl	Fr
LB	36	Justin Macias	Fr
S	37	Tavion Grant	So
CB	38	D'Andre Patin	Fr
S	39	Brandon Marshall	Fr
LB	42	Lance Rockwood	Fr
DE	44	Ty Shelby	Sr
CB	48	Latayeveon Mcfee	Fr
CB	49	Qua'veon Turner	Fr
LB	52	Tralon Thomas	Jr
DT	53	Sam Plants	Fr
LB	58	Amontae Jernigan	Fr
DT	69	Quincy Ledet Jr.	Fr
DT	77	Colby Rivera	Fr
DT	90	Sir'Darrius Ellis	So
DT	91	Kevin Pointer	Fr
DT	92	Deion McNeal	Fr
DE	94	Seth Mason	Fr
DE	95	Elijah Fisher	Fr
DT	96	Marcus Moore	Fr
DE	98	Peyton Beckley	So

Special teams

Pos.	#	Name	Class
K	31	Calum Sutherland	Sr
P	43	Kip Warren	Fr
LS	54	Andrew Wells	Fr
LS	56	Bobbie Conklin	Sr
LS	60	Hayden Welte	Fr
LS	61	Trey Corley	So
K	99	Aidan Mulreed	So

Head coach

- Terry Bowden (Florida State)

Coordinators/assistant coaches

- Rich Rodriguez (West Virginia)
  Offensive coordinator/qb
- Zac Alley (Clemson)
  Defensive coordinator/lb
- Ron West (Clemson)
  Special teams coordinator/de
- Alonzo Hampton (Louisiana–Monroe)
  Safeties
- Xavier Brewer (Clemson)
  Cornerbacks
- Mike DiAngelo (Franciscan)
  Tight ends
- Willie Green (Florida)
  Defensive linemen
- Tony Hull (Louisiana)
  Outside receivers
- Rod McDowell (Clemson)
  Running backs
- Maverick Morris (Clemson)
  Offensive linemen

Legend

- (C) Team captain
- (S) Suspended
- (I) Ineligible
- Injured
- Redshirt

Roster
Last update: 7 July 2021

== Schedule ==
The 2021 schedule consisted of 6 home and 6 away games in the regular season. The Warhawks would travel to Sun Belt foes Coastal Carolina, Appalachian State, Texas State, and Louisiana. ULM would play host to Sun Belt foes Troy, Georgia State, South Alabama, and Arkansas State.

ULM would host two of the four non-conference opponents at Malone Stadium, Jackson State, from NCAA Division I FCS Southwestern Athletic Conference and Liberty, a FBS Independent, and would travel to Kentucky and LSU, both from the Southeastern Conference.

Date	Time	Opponent	Site	TV	Result	Attendance
September 4	11:00 a.m.	at Kentucky*	Kroger Field; Lexington, KY	SECN	L 10–45	47,693
September 18	7:00 p.m.	Jackson State*	Malone Stadium; Monroe, LA	ESPN3	W 12–7	21,720
September 25	7:00 p.m.	Troy	Malone Stadium; Monroe, LA	ESPN+	W 29–16	12,766
October 2	1:30 p.m.	at No. 16 Coastal Carolina	Brooks Stadium; Conway, SC	ESPN+	L 6–59	18,674
October 9	7:00 p.m.	Georgia State	Malone Stadium; Monroe, LA	ESPN3	L 21–55	9,913
October 16	6:00 p.m.	Liberty*	Malone Stadium; Monroe, LA	ESPN+	W 31–28	11,546
October 23	6:00 p.m.	South Alabama^{†}	Malone Stadium; Monroe, LA	ESPN3	W 41–31	11,723
October 30	2:30 p.m.	at Appalachian State	Kidd Brewer Stadium; Boone, NC	ESPN+	L 28–59	29,321
November 6	2:00 p.m.	at Texas State	Bobcat Stadium; San Marcos, TX	ESPN+	L 19–27	16,237
November 13	4:00 p.m.	Arkansas State	Malone Stadium; Monroe, LA	ESPN+	L 24–27	12,010
November 20	8:00 p.m.	at LSU*	Tiger Stadium; Baton Rouge, LA	ESPN2	L 14–27	92,790
November 27	3:00 p.m.	at Louisiana	Cajun Field; Lafayette, LA (Battle on the Bayou)	ESPNU	L 16–21	18,447
*Non-conference game; ^{†}Homecoming; Rankings from AP Poll and CFP Rankings after November 24 released prior to game; All times are in Central time

== Game summaries ==
=== At Kentucky ===
Louisiana–Monroe at Kentucky

Team	1	2	3	4	Total
Warhawks	7	0	0	3	10
• Wildcats	14	14	3	14	45

- Date: September 4, 2021
- Location: Kroger Field
  Lexington, KY
- Game start: 11:03 a.m. CDT
- Elapsed time: 3 hours and 11 minutes
- Game attendance: 47,693
- Game weather: 78 °F (26 °C) • Weather: Sunny • Wind: SW 7 MPH
- Referee: Jason McArthur
- TV announcers (SEC Network): Taylor Zarzour (play–by–play), Matt Stinchcomb (analyst), and Alyssa Lang (sideline)
- Source: Official Box Score

Scoring summary
1	08:53	ULM	Kadyn Roach 3-yard rush (Calum Sutherland kick) (12 plays, 42 yards, 5:01)	ULM 7–0
1	06:13	UK	Wan'Dale Robinson 33-yard pass from Will Levis (Matt Ruffolo kick) (5 plays, 84 yards, 2:40)	TIE 7–7
1	04:20	UK	Josh Ali 58-yard pass from Will Levis (Matt Ruffolo kick) (1 play, 58 yards, 0:09)	UK 14–7
2	10:40	UK	Chris Rodriguez 2-yard rush (Matt Ruffolo kick) (14 plays, 84 yards, 6:37)	UK 21–7
2	05:44	UK	Wan'Dale Robinson 15-yard pass from Will Levis (Matt Ruffolo kick) (4 plays, 80 yards, 2:24)	UK 28–7
3	03:54	UK	Matt Ruffolo 45-yard field goal (7 plays, 51 yards, 3:40)	UK 31–7
4	13:07	UK	Brenden Bates 4-yard pass from Will Levis (Matt Ruffolo kick) (9 plays, 76 yards, 4:00)	UK 38–7
4	04:39	ULM	Calum Sutherland 29-yard field goal (11 plays, 48 yards, 5:11)	UK 38–10
4	01:00	UK	Michael Drennen II 4-yard rush (Matt Ruffolo kick) (8 plays, 68 yards, 3:39)	UK 45–10

Statistics	Louisiana–Monroe	Kentucky
First downs	12	24
Total yards	87	554
Rushing yards	17	135
Passing yards	70	419
Turnovers	0	2
Time of possession	28:13	31:47

Team	Category	Player	Statistics
Louisiana–Monroe	Passing	Rhett Rodriguez	9/17, 56 yards
Louisiana–Monroe	Rushing	Chandler Rogers	7 carries, 11 yards
Louisiana–Monroe	Receiving	Boogie Knight	6 receptions, 58 yards
Kentucky	Passing	Will Levis	18/26, 367 yards, 4 TDs, 1 INT
Kentucky	Rushing	Christopher Rodriguez Jr.	19 carries, 125 yards, 1 TD
Kentucky	Receiving	Josh Ali	5 receptions, 136 yards, 1 TD

=== Jackson State ===
Jackson State at Louisiana–Monroe

Team	1	2	3	4	Total
RV (FCS) Tigers	0	7	0	0	7
• Warhawks	3	0	3	6	12

- Date: September 18, 2021
- Location: Malone Stadium
  Monroe, LA
- Game start: 7:05 p.m. CDT
- Elapsed time: 3 hours and 28 minutes
- Game attendance: 21,720
- Game weather: 86 °F (30 °C) • Weather: Cloudy • Wind: E 7 MPH
- Referee: William Bonet
- TV announcers (ESPN3): Mike Hammett (play–by–play) and Josh Pederson (analyst)

Scoring summary
1	09:17	ULM	Calum Sutherland 29-yard field goal (10 plays, 45 yards, 3:11)	ULM 3–0
2	06:03	JSU	Josh Lanier 24-yard pass from Shedeur Sanders (Glenn Misiak kick) (5 plays, 50 yards, 2:18)	JSU 7–3
3	03:12	ULM	Calum Sutherland 45-yard field goal (8 plays, 27 yards, 2:33)	JSU 7–6
4	11:37	ULM	Calum Sutherland 42-yard field goal (11 plays, 55 yards, 4:19)	ULM 9–7
4	02:24	ULM	Calum Sutherland 49-yard field goal (5 plays, 14 yards, 3:00)	ULM 12–7

Statistics	Jackson State	Louisiana–Monroe
First downs	16	17
Total yards	285	250
Rushing yards	26	94
Passing yards	259	156
Turnovers	3	0
Time of possession	26:27	33:33

Team	Category	Player	Statistics
Jackson State	Passing	Shedeur Sanders	28/41, 259 yards, 1 TD, 1 INT
Jackson State	Rushing	Peytton Pickett	5 carries, 10 yards
Jackson State	Receiving	Joshua Lanier	7 receptions, 72 yards, 1 TD
Louisiana–Monroe	Passing	Rhett Rodriguez	16/29, 150 yards
Louisiana–Monroe	Rushing	Andrew Henry	9 carries, 52 yards
Louisiana–Monroe	Receiving	Boogie Knight	6 receptions, 78 yards

=== Troy ===
Troy at Louisiana–Monroe

Team	1	2	3	4	Total
Trojans	0	3	7	6	16
• Warhawks	7	3	10	9	29

- Date: September 25, 2021
- Location: Malone Stadium
  Monroe, LA
- Game start: 7:05 p.m. CDT
- Elapsed time: 3 hours and 17 minutes
- Game attendance: 12,766
- Game weather: 78 °F (26 °C) • Weather: Sunny • Wind: NE 0 MPH
- Referee: Jeremy Parker
- TV announcers (ESPN+): Mike Hammett (play–by–play) and Josh Peterson (analyst)

Scoring summary
1	08:03	ULM	Zach Jackson 23-yard pass from Rhett Rodriguez (Calum Sutherland kick) (8 plays, 80 yards, 3:55)	ULM 7–0
2	10:14	ULM	Calum Sutherland 26-yard field goal (9 plays, 43 yards, 4:41)	ULM 10–0
2	01:31	TROY	Brooks Buce 32-yard field goal (4 plays, 7 yards, 2:13)	ULM 10–3
3	11:56	ULM	Andrew Henry 40-yard rush (Calum Sutherland kick) (8 plays, 75 yards, 3:04)	ULM 17–3
3	08:57	TROY	Luke Whittemore 49-yard pass from Taylor Powell (Brooks Buce kick) (7 plays, 77 yards, 2:56)	ULM 17–10
3	05:19	ULM	Calum Sutherland 32-yard field goal (8 plays, 60 yards, 3:38)	ULM 20–10
4	13:52	ULM	Team Safety (2 plays, -4 yards, 0:44)	ULM 22–10
4	09:40	ULM	Ja'Cquez Williams 96-yard interception returned (Calum Sutherland kick) (6 plays, 55 yards, 2:01)	ULM 29–10
4	00:36	TROY	Jamontez Woods 4-yard pass from Taylor Powell (two-point pass conversion attempt failed) (11 plays, 80 yards, 2:45)	ULM 29–16

Statistics	Troy	Louisiana–Monroe
First downs	18	15
Total yards	378	290
Rushing yards	67	122
Passing yards	311	168
Turnovers	1	1
Time of possession	31:32	28:28

Team	Category	Player	Statistics
Troy	Passing	Taylor Powell	35/49, 311 yards, 2 TDs, 1 INT
Troy	Rushing	Kimani Vidal	12 carries, 60 yards
Troy	Receiving	Reggie Todd	6 receptions, 83 yards
Louisiana–Monroe	Passing	Rhett Rodriguez	10/16, 131 yards, 1 TD
Louisiana–Monroe	Rushing	Andrew Henry	19 carries, 108 yards, 1 TD
Louisiana–Monroe	Receiving	Zach Jackson	4 receptions, 80 yards, 1 TD

=== At Coastal Carolina ===
Louisiana–Monroe at Coastal Carolina

Team	1	2	3	4	Total
Warhawks	3	0	3	0	6
• No. 16 Chanticleers	14	24	0	21	59

- Date: October 2, 2021
- Location: Brooks Stadium
  Conway, SC
- Game start: 1:35 p.m. CDT
- Elapsed time: 2 hours and 57 minutes
- Game attendance: 18,674
- Game weather: 82 °F (28 °C) • Weather: Sunny • Wind: SE 6 MPH
- Referee:
- TV announcers (ESPN+): Jeff McCarragher (play–by–play) and Nate Ross (analyst)

Scoring summary
1	09:06	CCU	Isaiah Likely 5-yard pass from Grayson McCall(Liam Gray Kick) (6 plays, 55 yards, 3:28)	CCU 7–0
1	04:46	CCU	Braydon Bennett 10-yard rush (Liam Gray kick) (6 plays, 63 yards, 3:09)	CCU 14–0
1	00:55	ULM	Calum Sutherland 40-yard field goal (4 plays, yards, 1:12)	CCU 14–3
2	12:50	CCU	Isaiah Likely 30-yard pass from Grayson McCall (Kieran Colahan kick) (7 plays, 81 yards, 2:57)	CCU 21–3
2	11:19	CCU	Aaron Bedgoood 9 yard return of blocked punt, Liam Gray kick good	CCU 28–3
2	3:32	CCU	Braydon Bennett 29-yard rush (Liam Gray kick) (7 plays, 86 yards, 4:29)	CCU 35–3
2	00:00	CCU	Liam Gray 46-yard field goal (7 plays, 52 yards, 1:23)	CCU 38–3
3	7:31	ULM	Calum Sutherland 30-yard field goal (12 plays, 59 yards, 5:24)	CCU 38–6
4	14:39	CCU	CJ Beasley 15-yard rush (Kieran Colahan kick) (15 plays, 75 yards, 8:03)	CCU 45–6
4	12:56	CCU	Chris Rhone 32-yard pass from Jarrett Guest (Kieran Colahan kick) (2 plays, 40 yards, :39)	CCU 52–6
4	03:34	CCU	Jared Brown 5-yard pass from Zachary Stevens (Kieran Colahan kick) (9 plays, 75 yards, 6:19)	CCU 59–6

Statistics	Louisiana–Monroe	Coastal Carolina
First downs	10	26
Total yards	203	557
Rushing yards	72	275
Passing yards	131	282
Turnovers	1	1
Time of possession	24:14	35:46

Team	Category	Player	Statistics
Louisiana–Monroe	Passing	Chandler Rogers	9/17, 100 yards
Louisiana–Monroe	Rushing	Chandler Rogers	11 carries, 40 yards
Louisiana–Monroe	Receiving	Zach Jackson	3 receptions, 48 yards
Coastal Carolina	Passing	Grayson McCall	13/13, 212 yards
Coastal Carolina	Rushing	Reese White	15 carries, 95 yards
Coastal Carolina	Receiving	Isaiah Likely	5 receptions, 95 yards

=== Georgia State ===
Georgia State at Louisiana–Monroe

Team	1	2	3	4	Total
• Panthers	7	21	14	13	55
Warhawks	7	0	7	7	21

- Date: October 9, 2021
- Location: Malone Stadium
  Monroe, LA
- Game start: 7:05 p.m. CDT
- Elapsed time: 3 hours and 29 minutes
- Game attendance: 9,913
- Game weather: 81 °F (27 °C) • Weather: Sunny • Wind: S 8 MPH
- Referee: Kyle Olson
- TV announcers (ESPN3): Mike Hammett (play–by–play) and David Griffith (analyst)

Scoring summary
1	09:35	ULM	Zach Rasmussen 26-yard pass from Chandler Rogers (Calum Sutherland kick) (6 plays, 97 yards, 1:44)	ULM 7–0
1	06:35	GSU	Jamyest Williams 1-yard rush (Noel Ruiz kick) (10 plays, 75 yards, 3:00)	TIE 7–7
2	13:38	GSU	Aubry Payne 10-yard pass from Darren Grainger (Noel Ruiz kick) (7 plays, 74 yards, 2:19)	GSU 14–7
2	04:23	GSU	Ja'Cyais Credle 31-yard pass from Darren Grainger (Noel Ruiz kick) (14 plays, 76 yards, 5:12)	GSU 21–7
2	01:33	GSU	Tucker Gregg 2-yard rush (Noel Ruiz kick) (7 plays, 34 yards, 2:25)	GSU 28–7
3	11:53	GSU	Aubry Payne 9-yard pass from Darren Grainger (Noel Ruiz kick) (8 plays, 75 yards, 3:07)	GSU 35–7
3	09:10	ULM	Zach Johnson 18-yard pass from Chandler Rogers (Calum Sutherland kick) (7 plays, 75 yards, 2:38)	GSU 35–14
3	04:31	GSU	Darren Grainger 1-yard rush (Noel Ruiz kick) (10 plays, 70 yards, 4:39)	GSU 42–14
4	14:52	GSU	Ja'Cyais Credle 38-yard pass from Darren Grainger (Noel Ruiz kick) (6 plays, 80 yards, 2:22)	GSU 48–14
4	11:48	GSU	Cornelious Brown IV 26-yard rush (Noel Ruiz PAT failed) (5 plays, 55 yards, 2:12)	GSU 55–14
4	04:34	ULM	Coby Cavil 6-yard pass from Jiya Wright (Calum Sutherland kick) (12 plays, 70 yards, 4:51)	GSU 55–21

Statistics	Georgia State	Louisiana–Monroe
First downs	39	21
Total yards	572	359
Rushing yards	326	122
Passing yards	246	237
Turnovers	0	2
Time of possession	35:08	24:52

Team	Category	Player	Statistics
Georgia State	Passing	Darren Grainger	18/25, 230 yards, 4 TDs
Georgia State	Rushing	Darren Grainger	12 carries, 84 yards, 1 TD
Georgia State	Receiving	Ja'Cyais Credle	7 receptions, 130 yards, 2 TDs
Louisiana–Monroe	Passing	Chandler Rogers	15/23, 208 yards, 2 TDs
Louisiana–Monroe	Rushing	Chandler Rogers	14 carries, 72 yards
Louisiana–Monroe	Receiving	Boogie Knight	5 receptions, 78 yards

=== Liberty ===
Liberty at Louisiana–Monroe

Team	1	2	3	4	Total
Flames	0	14	0	14	28
• Warhawks	0	0	28	3	31

- Date: October 16, 2021
- Location: Malone Stadium
  Monroe, LA
- Game start: 6:05 p.m. CDT
- Elapsed time: 3 hours and 12 minutes
- Game attendance: 11,546
- Game weather: 68 °F (20 °C) • Weather: Sunny • Wind: N 13 MPH
- Referee: Marshall Lewis
- Television network: ESPN+

Scoring summary
1	05:11	LIB	Malik Willis 3-yard rush (Brayden Beck kick) (4 plays, 18 yards, 1:58)	LIB 7–0
1	00:16	LIB	CJ Daniels 9-yard pass from Malik Willis (Brayden Beck kick) (8 plays, 85 yards, 1:33)	LIB 14–0
2	11:09	ULM	Andrew Henry 12-yard pass from Chandler Rogers (Calum Sutherland kick) (10 plays, 73 yards, 3:46)	LIB 14–7
2	10:12	ULM	Abraham Alce 1-yard rush (Calum Sutherland kick) (1 play, 1 yard, 0:04)	TIE 14–14
2	06:37	ULM	Andrew Henry 40-yard rush (Calum Sutherland kick) (5 plays, 68 yards, 2:09)	ULM 21–14
2	01:22	ULM	Zach Rasmussen 14-yard pass from Chandler Rogers (Calum Sutherland kick) (8 plays, 62 yards, 3:19)	ULM 28–14
4	13:42	LIB	Shedro Louis 7-yard rush (Brayden Beck kick) (8 plays, 65 yards, 2:40)	ULM 28–21
4	07:49	LIB	Malik Willis 53-yard rush (Brayden Beck kick) (3 plays, 60 yards, 0:40)	TIE 28–28
4	01:44	ULM	Calum Sutherland 53-yard field goal (7 plays, 57 yards, 2:31)	ULM 31–28

Statistics	Liberty	Louisiana–Monroe
First downs	22	22
Total yards	386	365
Rushing yards	251	140
Passing yards	135	225
Turnovers	3	1
Time of possession	32:50	27:10

Team	Category	Player	Statistics
Liberty	Passing	Malik Willis	16/28, 135 yards, 1 TD, 3 INTs
Liberty	Rushing	Malik Willis	23 carries, 157 yards, 2 TDs
Liberty	Receiving	DJ Stubbs	2 receptions, 32 yards
Louisiana–Monroe	Passing	Chandler Rogers	16/25, 225 yards, 2 TDs, 1 INT
Louisiana–Monroe	Rushing	Andrew Henry	15 carries, 80 yards, 1 TD
Louisiana–Monroe	Receiving	Zach Jackson	4 receptions, 47 yards

=== South Alabama ===
South Alabama at Louisiana–Monroe

Team	1	2	3	4	Total
Jaguars	7	10	14	0	31
• Warhawks	7	17	14	3	41

- Date: October 23, 2021
- Location: Malone Stadium
  Monroe, LA
- Game start: 6:05 p.m. CDT
- Elapsed time: 3 hours and 4 minutes
- Game attendance: 11,723
- Game weather: 83 °F (28 °C) • Weather: Sunny • Wind: S 12 MPH
- Referee: Trennis Livingston
- TV announcers (ESPN+): Mike Hammett (play–by–play) and David Griffith (analyst)

Scoring summary
1	12:37	ULM	Andrew Henry 20-yard rush (Calum Sutherland kick) (7 plays, 75 yards, 2:23)	ULM 7–0
1	04:18	USA	Jalen Wayne 10-yard pass from Jake Bentley (Diego Guajardo kick) (8 plays, 62 yards, 4:30)	TIE 7–7
2	12:30	ULM	Jared Sparks 12-yard pass from Chandler Rogers (Calum Sutherland kick) (6 plays, 49 yards, 1:48)	ULM 14–7
2	09:13	USA	Diego Guajardo 28-yard field goal (7 plays, 55 yards, 3:17)	ULM 14–10
2	05:23	ULM	Calum Sutherland 39-yard field goal (10 plays, 53 yards, 3:50)	ULM 17–10
2	01:24	USA	Lincoln Sefcik 12-yard pass from Jake Bentley (Diego Guajardo kick) (9 plays, 65 yards, 3:59)	TIE 17–17
2	00:04	ULM	Boogie Knight 9-yard pass from Chandler Rogers (Calum Sutherland kick) (11 plays, 75 yards, 1:20)	ULM 24–17
3	10:17	USA	Jalen Tolbert 8-yard pass from Jake Bentley (Diego Guajardo kick) (10 plays, 75 yards, 4:43)	TIE 24–24
3	06:28	USA	Jalen Tolbert 40-yard pass from Jake Bentley (Diego Guajardo kick) (4 plays, 66 yards, 1:44)	USA 31–24
3	03:57	ULM	Fred Lloyd Jr. 21-yard pass from Chandler Rogers (Calum Sutherland kick) (6 plays, 75 yards, 2:31)	TIE 31–31
3	01:07	ULM	Will Derrick 81-yard pass from Chandler Rogers (Calum Sutherland kick) (2 plays, 82 yards, 0:35)	ULM 38–31
4	06:28	ULM	Calum Sutherland 40-yard field goal (10 plays, 51 yards, 5:32)	ULM 41–31

Statistics	South Alabama	Louisiana–Monroe
First downs	22	25
Total yards	409	555
Rushing yards	89	186
Passing yards	320	369
Turnovers	3	1
Time of possession	34:18	25:42

Team	Category	Player	Statistics
South Alabama	Passing	Jake Bentley	30/41, 320 yards, 4 TDs, 2 INTs
South Alabama	Rushing	Terrion Avery	14 carries, 87 yards
South Alabama	Receiving	Jalen Tolbert	10 receptions, 155 yards, 2 TDs
Louisiana–Monroe	Passing	Chandler Rogers	25/35, 369 yards, 4 TDs
Louisiana–Monroe	Rushing	Andrew Henry	18 carries, 88 yards, 1 TD
Louisiana–Monroe	Receiving	Will Derrick	5 receptions, 135 yards, 1 TD

=== At Appalachian State ===
Louisiana–Monroe at Appalachian State

Team	1	2	3	4	Total
Warhawks	0	7	14	7	28
• Mountaineers	21	28	3	7	59

- Date: October 30, 2021
- Location: Kidd Brewer Stadium
  Boone, NC
- Game start: 2:35 p.m. CDT
- Elapsed time: 3 hours and 4 minutes
- Game attendance: 29,321
- Game weather: 48 °F (9 °C) • Weather: Cloudy • Wind: NW 5 MPH
- Referee: Kyle Olson
- TV announcers (ESPN+): David Jackson (play–by–play) and Avery Hall (analyst)

Scoring summary
1	07:08	APP	Camerun Peoples 3-yard rush (Chandler Staton kick) (8 plays, 72 yards, 3:30)	APP 7–0
1	04:26	APP	Malik Williams 16-yard pass from Chase Brice (Chandler Staton kick) (5 plays, 28 yards, 2:36)	APP 14–0
1	02:08	APP	Caleb Spurlin 1-yard pass from Chase Brice (Chandler Staton kick) (6 plays, 45 yards, 2:07)	APP 21–0
2	10:27	APP	Camerun Peoples 26-yard rush (Chandler Staton kick) (10 plays, 73 yards, 3:17)	APP 28–0
2	07:11	APP	Caleb Spurlin 1-yard pass from Chase Brice (Chandler Staton kick) (5 plays, 69 yards, 2:14)	APP 35–0
2	04:01	ULM	Jiya Wright 3-yard rush (Calum Sutherland kick) (4 plays, 42 yards, 0:54)	APP 35–7
2	00:39	APP	Corey Sutton 14-yard pass from Chase Brice (Chandler Staton kick) (5 plays, 27 yards, 1:49)	APP 42–7
2	00:00	APP	Steven Jones Jr. 14-yard interception returned (Chandler Staton kick) (2 plays, -2 yards, 0:34)	APP 49–7
3	10:35	ULM	Dariyan Wiley 13-yard pass from Jiya Wright (Calum Sutherland kick) (10 plays, 75 yards, 4:25)	APP 49–14
3	08:05	APP	Chandler Staton 31-yard field goal (7 plays, 61 yards, 2:30)	APP 52–14
3	00:26	ULM	Abraham Alce 2-yard rush (Calum Sutherland kick) (16 plays, 75 yards, 7:39)	APP 52–21
4	10:22	APP	Nate Noel 7-yard rush (Chandler Staton kick) (3 plays, 50 yards, 1:09)	APP 59–21
4	09:58	ULM	Jakyle Holmes 68-yard rush (Calum Sutherland kick) (1 play, 86 yards, 0:17)	APP 59–28

Statistics	Louisiana–Monroe	Appalachian State
First downs	17	25
Total yards	391	521
Rushing yards	230	251
Passing yards	161	270
Turnovers	5	0
Time of possession	30:06	29:54

Team	Category	Player	Statistics
Louisiana–Monroe	Passing	Jiya Wright	9/17, 158 yards, 1 TD, 2 INTs
Louisiana–Monroe	Rushing	Jiya Wright	20 carries, 91 yards, 1 TD
Louisiana–Monroe	Receiving	Jevin Frett	1 reception, 40 yards
Appalachian State	Passing	Chase Brice	20/30, 256 yards, 4 TDs
Appalachian State	Rushing	Nate Noel	17 carries, 132 yards, 1 TD
Appalachian State	Receiving	Corey Sutton	5 receptions, 77 yards, 1 TD

=== At Texas State ===
Louisiana–Monroe at Texas State

Team	1	2	3	4	Total
Warhawks	6	10	3	0	19
• Bobcats	10	10	0	7	27

- Date: November 6, 2021
- Location: Bobcat Stadium
  San Marcos, TX
- Game start: 2:05 p.m. CDT
- Elapsed time: 3 hours and 15 minutes
- Game attendance: 16,237
- Game weather: 67 °F (19 °C) • Weather: Sunny • Wind: E 3 MPH
- Referee: Wayne Winkler
- TV announcers (ESPN+): Brant Freeman (play–by–play), Keith Moreland (analyst), and Koral Riggs (sideline reporter)

Scoring summary
1	08:12	TXST	Seth Keller 42-yard field goal (11 plays, 73 yards, 3:41)	TXST 3–0
1	02:58	ULM	Andrew Henry 1-yard rush (Calum Sutherland PAT failed) (12 plays, 72 yards, 5:14)	ULM 6–3
1	01:11	TXST	Javen Banks 49-yard pass from Tyler Vitt (Seth Keller kick) (5 plays, 75 yards, 1:47)	TXST 10–6
2	10:04	ULM	Calum Sutherland 52-yard field goal (12 plays, 40 yards, 6:07)	TXST 10–9
2	05:58	TXST	Caleb Twyford 1-yard rush (Seth Keller kick) (9 plays, 75 yards, 4:06)	TXST 17–9
2	02:02	ULM	Chandler Rogers 10-yard rush (Calum Sutherland kick) (9 plays, 75 yards, 3:56)	TXST 17–16
2	00:54	TXST	Seth Keller 43-yard field goal (9 plays, 49 yards, 1:08)	TXST 20–16
3	10:13	ULM	Calum Sutherland 45-yard field goal (13 plays, 47 yards, 4:47)	TXST 20–19
01:43	TXST	Jahmyl Jeter 26-yard rush (Seth Keller kick) (4 plays, 40 yards, 0:59)	TXST 27–19

Statistics	Louisiana–Monroe	Texas State
First downs	28	19
Total yards	432	434
Rushing yards	170	172
Passing yards	262	262
Turnovers	0	0
Time of possession	38:02	21:58

Team	Category	Player	Statistics
Louisiana–Monroe	Passing	Chandler Rogers	28/43, 262 yards
Louisiana–Monroe	Rushing	Andrew Henry	23 carries, 82 yards, 1 TD
Louisiana–Monroe	Receiving	Will Derrick	6 receptions, 74 yards
Texas State	Passing	Tyler Vitt	16/31, 262 yards, 1 TD
Texas State	Rushing	Jahyml Jeter	16 carries, 92 yards, 1 TD
Texas State	Receiving	Marcell Barbee	5 receptions, 102 yards

=== Arkansas State ===
Arkansas State at Louisiana–Monroe

Team	1	2	3	4	Total
• Red Wolves	7	3	7	10	27
Warhawks	0	7	17	0	24

- Date: November 13, 2021
- Location: Malone Stadium
  Monroe, LA
- Game start: 4:05 p.m. CST
- Elapsed time: 3 hours and 12 minutes
- Game attendance: 12,010
- Game weather: 57 °F (14 °C) • Weather: Sunny • Wind: NW 6 MPH
- Referee: Trennis Livingston
- TV announcers (ESPN+): Mike Hammett (play–by–play)

Scoring summary
1	11:15	ARST	Corey Rucker 9-yard rush (Blake Grupe kick) (6 plays, 80 yards, 1:48)	ARST 7–0
2	11:10	ARST	Blake Grupe 30-yard field goal (6 plays, 69 yards, 2:09)	ARST 10–0
2	00:33	ULM	Malik Jackson 3-yard rush (Calum Sutherland kick) (4 plays, 63 yards, 0:55)	ARST 10–7
3	14:48	ULM	Malik Jackson 75-yard rush (Calum Sutherland kick) (1 play, 75 yards, 0:12)	ULM 14–10
3	10:01	ULM	Jevin Frett 17-yard pass from Rhett Rodriguez (Calum Sutherland kick) (7 plays, 50 yards, 2:55)	ULM 21–10
3	07:26	ARST	Te'Vailance Hunt 22-yard pass from Layne Hatcher (Blake Grupe kick) (7 plays, 76 yards, 2:28)	ULM 21–17
3	05:00	ULM	Calum Sutherland 32-yard field goal (7 plays, 60 yards, 2:26)	ULM 24–17
4	07:56	ARST	Te'Vailance Hunt 20-yard pass from Layne Hatcher (Blake Grupe kick) (9 plays, 77 yards, 3:50)	TIE 24–24
4	01:17	ARST	Blake Grupe 42-yard field goal (9 plays, 55 yards, 2:41)	ARST 27–24

Statistics	Arkansas State	Louisiana–Monroe
First downs	22	18
Total yards	538	372
Rushing yards	94	177
Passing yards	444	195
Turnovers	2	2
Time of possession	32:23	27:37

Team	Category	Player	Statistics
Arkansas State	Passing	Layne Hatcher	34/50, 444 yards, 2 TDs, 2 INTs
Arkansas State	Rushing	Lincoln Pare	22 carries, 73 yards
Arkansas State	Receiving	Corey Rucker	7 receptions, 103 yards
Louisiana–Monroe	Passing	Rhett Rodriguez	12/29, 160 yards, 1 TD, 2 INTs
Louisiana–Monroe	Rushing	Malik Jackson	22 carries, 166 yards, 2 TDs
Louisiana–Monroe	Receiving	Boogie Knight	5 receptions, 76 yards

=== At LSU ===
Louisiana–Monroe at Louisiana State

Team	1	2	3	4	Total
Warhawks	0	7	0	7	14
• Tigers	7	10	7	3	27

- Date: November 20, 2021
- Location: Tiger Stadium
  Baton Rouge, LA
- Game start: 8:05 p.m. CST
- Elapsed time: 3 hours and 8 minutes
- Game attendance: 92,790
- Game weather: 63 °F (17 °C) • Weather: Clear • Wind: E 5 MPH
- Referee: David Smith
- TV announcers (ESPN2): Brian Custer (play–by–play), Kelly Stouffer (analyst), and Lauren Sisler (sideline reporter)

Scoring summary
1	11:49	LSU	Max Johnson 3-yard rush (Cade York kick) (5 plays, 64 yards, 2:08)	LSU 7–0
2	12:05	LSU	Cade York 27-yard field goal (9 plays, 24 yards, 2:43)	LSU 10–0
2	09:19	LSU	Malik Nabers 67-yard pass from Max Johnson (Cade York kick) (3 plays, 71 yards, 0:54)	LSU 17–0
2	03:34	ULM	Boogie Knight 28-yard pass from Rhett Rodriguez (Calum Sutherland kick) (2 plays, 28 yards, 0:40)	LSU 17–7
3	01:29	LSU	Brian Thomas Jr. 42-yard pass from Max Johnson (Cade York kick) (8 plays, 82 yards, 4:09)	LSU 24–7
4	03:20	ULM	Zach Rasmussen 27-yard pass from Chandler Rogers (Calum Sutherland kick) (10 plays, 58 yards, 4:02)	LSU 24–14
4	00:46	LSU	Cade York 50-yard field goal (8 plays, 13 yards, 2:34)	LSU 27–14

Statistics	Louisiana–Monroe	LSU
First downs	18	17
Total yards	311	411
Rushing yards	118	92
Passing yards	193	319
Turnovers	1	1
Time of possession	27:15	32:45

Team	Category	Player	Statistics
Louisiana–Monroe	Passing	Rhett Rodriguez	12/22, 157 yards, 1 TD, 1 INT
Louisiana–Monroe	Rushing	Malik Jackson	21 carries, 78 yards
Louisiana–Monroe	Receiving	Boogie Knight	5 receptions, 57 yards, 1 TD
LSU	Passing	Max Johnson	22/33, 319 yards, 2 TDs
LSU	Rushing	Tyrion Davis-Price	21 carries, 82 yards
LSU	Receiving	Malik Nabers	4 receptions, 143 yards, 1 TD

=== At Louisiana ===
Louisiana–Monroe at Louisiana

Team	1	2	3	4	Total
Warhawks	3	7	0	6	16
• Ragin' Cajuns	14	0	7	0	21

- Date: November 27, 2021
- Location: Cajun Field
  Lafayette, LA
- Game start: 3:02 p.m. CST
- Elapsed time: 3 hours and 6 minutes
- Game attendance: 18,447
- Game weather: 56 °F (13 °C) • Weather: Rain • Wind: NW 1 MPH
- Referee: William Bonet
- TV announcers (ESPNU): Clay Matvick (play–by–play), Rocky Boiman (analyst), and Tiffany Blackmon (sideline reporter)

Scoring summary
1	14:20	LA	Levi Lewis 20-yard rush (Nate Snyder kick) (2 plays, 75 yards, 0:40)	LA 7–0
1	07:33	ULM	Calum Sutherland 26-yard field goal (15 plays, 66 yards, 6:47)	LA 7–3
1	03:48	LA	Kyren Lacy 37-yard pass from Chris Smith (Nate Snyder kick) (8 plays, 75 yards, 3:45)	LA 14–3
2	12:29	ULM	Boogie Knight 46-yard pass from Rhett Rodriguez (Calum Sutherland kick) (5 plays, 62 yards, 1:39)	LA 14–10
3	05:01	LA	Emani Bailey 2-yard rush (Nate Snyder kick) (4 plays, 85 yards, 1:56)	LA 21–10
4	01:35	ULM	Malik Jackson 12-yard rush (two-point pass conversion attempt failed) (11 plays, 71 yards, 2:14)	LA 21–16

Statistics	Louisiana–Monroe	Louisiana
First downs	20	17
Total yards	325	382
Rushing yards	164	165
Passing yards	161	217
Turnovers	1	0
Time of possession	30:32	29:28

Team	Category	Player	Statistics
Louisiana–Monroe	Passing	Rhett Rodriguez	11/24, 145 yards, 1 TD
Louisiana–Monroe	Rushing	Malik Jackson	23 carries, 112 yards, 1 TD
Louisiana–Monroe	Receiving	Boogie Knight	2 receptions, 47 yards, 1 TD
Louisiana	Passing	Levi Lewis	13/22, 163 yards
Louisiana	Rushing	Montrell Johnson	5 carries, 62 yards
Louisiana	Receiving	Neal Johnson	3 receptions, 80 yards
