= 2021 Louisiana Ragin' Cajuns football team =

American college football season

2021 Louisiana Ragin' Cajuns football

Sun Belt champion Sun Belt West Division champion New Orleans Bowl champion

Sun Belt Championship Game, W 24–16 vs. Appalachian State

New Orleans Bowl, W 36–21 vs. Marshall
- Conference: Sun Belt Conference
- West Division

Ranking
- Coaches: No. 18
- AP: No. 16
- Record: 13–1 (8–0 Sun Belt)
- Head coach: Billy Napier (4th season; regular season); Michael Desormeaux (interim; bowl game)
- Co-offensive coordinators: Michael Desormeaux (1st season); Tim Leger (1st season)
- Offensive scheme: Spread
- Defensive coordinator: Patrick Toney (2nd season)
- Base defense: 4–2–5
- Home stadium: Cajun Field

2021 Sun Belt Conference football standings
	Conf.			Overall
Team	W		L	W		L
East Division
Appalachian State xy	7	–	1	10	–	4
Georgia State	6	–	2	8	–	5
Coastal Carolina	6	–	2	11	–	2
Troy	3	–	5	5	–	7
Georgia Southern	2	–	6	3	–	9
West Division
No. 16 Louisiana xy$	8	–	0	13	–	1
Texas State	3	–	5	4	–	8
Louisiana–Monroe	2	–	6	4	–	8
South Alabama	2	–	6	5	–	7
Arkansas State	1	–	7	2	–	10
Championship: Louisiana 24, Appalachian State 16
$ – Conference champion; x – Division champion/co-champions; y – Championship game participant; Rankings from AP Poll

The 2021 Louisiana Ragin' Cajuns football team represented the University of Louisiana at Lafayette in the 2021 NCAA Division I FBS football season. The Ragin' Cajuns played their home games at Cajun Field in Lafayette, Louisiana, and compete in the West Division of the Sun Belt Conference. They were led by fourth-year head coach Billy Napier. The Cajuns began the season with an away matchup against Big 12's Texas and concluded their regular season at conference and in-state rival Louisiana–Monroe.

Napier was named the head coach of the Florida Gators on November 28. He announced that he would coach in the Sun Belt Championship Game on December 4 before departing. Napier led the Ragin’ Cajuns to their first outright Sun Belt championship win, defeating the Appalachian State Mountaineers, and left the Ragin’ Cajuns on a victorious note. On December 5, the same date as Napier's departure, Louisiana announced that then-offensive coordinator Michael Desormeaux would be promoted to head coach for the team's bowl game and the 2022 season. In his first game, Desormeaux defeated Marshall in the 2021 New Orleans Bowl.

== Preseason ==
=== Recruiting class ===
College recruiting
Name	Hometown	School	Height	Weight	40^{‡}	Commit date
Clinton Anokwuru; OLB	Richmond, TX	Fort Bend Bush HS; Kansas	6 ft 3 in (1.91 m)	224 lb (102 kg)	–	Feb 3, 2021
Clinton Anokwuru; OLB	Recruit ratings: Scout: Rivals: 247Sports: ESPN:					
Key'Savalyn Barnes; CB	Logansport, LA	Logansport HS	5 ft 11 in (1.80 m)	188 lb (85 kg)	–	Dec 16, 2020
Key'Savalyn Barnes; CB	Recruit ratings: Scout: Rivals: 247Sports: ESPN:					
Jathan Caldwell; TE	Dickinson, TX	Dickinson HS	6 ft 2 in (1.88 m)	214 lb (97 kg)	–	Feb 3, 2021
Jathan Caldwell; TE	Recruit ratings: Scout: Rivals: 247Sports: ESPN:					
Cejae Ceasar; S	Iowa, LA	Iowa HS	6 ft 1 in (1.85 m)	187 lb (85 kg)	–	Dec 16, 2020
Cejae Ceasar; S	Recruit ratings: Scout: Rivals: 247Sports: ESPN:					
Jalen Clark; S	New Orleans, LA	Alabama Christian	6 ft 1 in (1.85 m)	190 lb (86 kg)	–	Feb 3, 2021
Jalen Clark; S	Recruit ratings: Scout: Rivals: 247Sports: ESPN:					
T. J. Fiailoa; OL	Lawton, OK	MacArthur HS; Louisiana–Monroe	6 ft 3 in (1.91 m)	190 lb (86 kg)	–	Feb 3, 2021
T. J. Fiailoa; OL	Recruit ratings: Scout: Rivals: 247Sports: ESPN:					
Kendre' Gant; ILB	Port St. Joe, FL	Port St. Joe HS; Independence CC	6 ft 1 in (1.85 m)	290 lb (130 kg)	–	Dec 16, 2020
Kendre' Gant; ILB	Recruit ratings: Scout: Rivals: 247Sports: ESPN:					
Cameron George; OLB	Lafayette, LA	Acadiana HS	6 ft 1 in (1.85 m)	236 lb (107 kg)	–	Feb 3, 2021
Cameron George; OLB	Recruit ratings: Scout: Rivals: 247Sports: ESPN:					
Hunter Herring; QB	West Monroe, LA	Ouachita Christian HS	6 ft 4 in (1.93 m)	201 lb (91 kg)	–	Dec 16, 2020
Hunter Herring; QB	Recruit ratings: Scout: Rivals: 247Sports: ESPN:					
George Jackson; OL	Stone Mountain, GA	Stephenson HS	6 ft 4 in (1.93 m)	325 lb (147 kg)	–	Feb 3, 2021
George Jackson; OL	Recruit ratings: Scout: Rivals: 247Sports: ESPN:					
Montrell Johnson; RB	New Orleans, LA	De La Salle HS	5 ft 11 in (1.80 m)	200 lb (91 kg)	–	Feb 3, 2021
Montrell Johnson; RB	Recruit ratings: Scout: Rivals: 247Sports: ESPN:					
Lance Legendre; QB	New Orleans, LA	Warren Easton HS; Maryland	6 ft 1 in (1.85 m)	215 lb (98 kg)	–	Feb 3, 2021
Lance Legendre; QB	Recruit ratings: Scout: Rivals: 247Sports: ESPN:					
Tyrone Lewis, Jr. S	Hammond, LA	Hammond HS; Kansas State	5 ft 11 in (1.80 m)	185 lb (84 kg)	–	Dec 16, 2020
Tyrone Lewis, Jr. S	Recruit ratings: Scout: Rivals: 247Sports: ESPN:					
Mackey Maillho; OL	Covington, LA	Mandeville HS	6 ft 7 in (2.01 m)	353 lb (160 kg)	–	Dec 16, 2020
Mackey Maillho; OL	Recruit ratings: Scout: Rivals: 247Sports: ESPN:					
Zy McDonald; QB	Ridgeland, MS	Ridgeland HS	5 ft 10 in (1.78 m)	183 lb (83 kg)	–	Dec 16, 2020
Zy McDonald; QB	Recruit ratings: Scout: Rivals: 247Sports: ESPN:					
K. C. Ossai; ILB	Conroe, TX	Oak Ridge HS	6 ft 1 in (1.85 m)	223 lb (101 kg)	–	Feb 3, 2021
K. C. Ossai; ILB	Recruit ratings: Scout: Rivals: 247Sports: ESPN:					
Ja'Marian Peterson; OLB	New Orleans, LA	De La Salle HS	6 ft 1 in (1.85 m)	235 lb (107 kg)	–	Feb 3, 2021
Ja'Marian Peterson; OLB	Recruit ratings: Scout: Rivals: 247Sports: ESPN:					
John Stephens Jr. WR	Logansport, LA	Logansport HS; TCU	6 ft 5 in (1.96 m)	226 lb (103 kg)	–	Dec 16, 2020
John Stephens Jr. WR	Recruit ratings: Scout: Rivals: 247Sports: ESPN:					
Dre'lyn Washington; RB	Hemphill, TX	Hemphill HS	5 ft 9 in (1.75 m)	210 lb (95 kg)	–	Dec 16, 2020
Dre'lyn Washington; RB	Recruit ratings: Scout: Rivals: 247Sports: ESPN:					
Cameron Whitfield; OLB	Houston, TX	Dawson HS	6 ft 1 in (1.85 m)	245 lb (111 kg)	–	Dec 16, 2020
Cameron Whitfield; OLB	Recruit ratings: Scout: Rivals: 247Sports: ESPN:					
Kendrell Williams; RB	Carencro, LA	Carencro HS	5 ft 10 in (1.78 m)	191 lb (87 kg)	–	Feb 3, 2021
Kendrell Williams; RB	Recruit ratings: Scout: Rivals: 247Sports: ESPN:					
Robert Williams; WR	Humble, TX	Trinity Christian HS	6 ft 1 in (1.85 m)	170 lb (77 kg)	–	Dec 16, 2020
Robert Williams; WR	Recruit ratings: Scout: Rivals: 247Sports: ESPN:					
Terrence Williams; ATH	Many, LA	Many HS	6 ft 0 in (1.83 m)	214 lb (97 kg)	–	Feb 3, 2021
Terrence Williams; ATH	Recruit ratings: Scout: Rivals: 247Sports: ESPN:					

=== Award watch lists ===
Listed in the order that they were released

==== Preseason ====
Award	Player	Position	Year
Maxwell Award	Levi Lewis	QB	SR
Chuck Bednarik Award	Bralen Trahan	S	RS-JR
Davey O'Brien Award	Levi Lewis	QB	SR
Doak Walker Award	Chris Smith	RB	RS-SO
Rimington Trophy	Shane Vallot	C	RS-JR
Allstate AFCA Good Works Team	Levi Lewis	QB	SR
Mackey Award	Johnny Lumpkin	TE	RS-JR
Bronko Nargurski Trophy	Bralen Trahan	S	RS-JR
Outland Trophy	O'Cyrus Torrence	OL	SO
Ray Guy Award	Rhys Byrns	P	JR
Wuerffel Trophy	Levi Lewis	QB	SR
Paul Hornung Award	Chris Smith	RB	RS-SO
College Football Performer of the Year	Levi Lewis	QB	SR
Manning Award	Levi Lewis	QB	SR
Earl Campbell Tyler Rose Award	Ken Marks	OL	RS-SR

=== Sun Belt coaches poll ===
The Sun Belt coaches poll was released on July 20, 2021. The Cajuns were picked to finish first in the West Division and first in the conference.

=== Sun Belt Preseason All-Conference teams ===
Offense

1st team

- O'Cyrus Torrence – Offensive lineman, SO

2nd team

- Levi Lewis – Quarterback, SR
- Max Mitchell – Offensive lineman, JR

Defense

1st team

- Bralen Trahan – Defensive back, RS-JR

2nd team

- Zi'Yon Hill – Defensive lineman, RS-JR
- Lorenzo McCaskill – Linebacker, RS-JR
- Eric Garror – Defensive back, JR

Special teams

1st team

- Rhys Byrns – Punter, JR
- Chris Smith – Return Specialist, RS-SO

== Personnel ==
2021 Louisiana Ragin' Cajuns football team roster
Players
Coaches
Offense

Pos.	#	Name	Class
RB	0	Jacob Kibodi	Jr
QB	1	Levi Lewis	Sr
WR	2	Kyren Lacy	Fr
WR	3	Golden Eke	So
WR	4	Cassius Allen	So
WR	6	Errol Rogers Jr.	Fr
WR	7	Brian Smith Jr.	Sr
WR	7	John Stephens Jr.	Jr
WR	8	Michael Jefferson	Jr
QB	8	Zy McDonald	Fr
QB	9	Lance Legendre	Fr
QB	10	Ben Wooldridge	So
WR	11	Calif Gossett	Sr
WR	13	Dalen Cambre	Fr
QB	15	Hunter Herring	Fr
QB	16	Chandler Fields	Fr
WR	17	Dontae Fleming	Fr
WR	18	Jalen Williams	Sr
WR	19	Jamal Bell	Sr
RB	20	Emani Bailey	Fr
RB	21	Chris Smith	So
RB	23	T. J. Wisham	Jr
TE	24	Pearse Migl	So
WR	25	Quincy Curry	Fr
WR	26	Kaleb Carter	So
WR	27	Trevor Russell	Jr
QB	28	Luke Bogan	Fr
WR	29	Peter LeBlanc	So
RB	30	Jordan Griffin	So
RB	31	Michael Orphey Jr.	So
WR	33	Pat Hughes	Jr
RB	34	Mike Martin	Fr
RB	37	Tyreese Jackson	Fr
WR	38	Da'Jon Bonnee	Fr
TE	41	Joe Lombardi Jr.	Fr
TE	44	Christian Sabatini	Fr
OL	50	Nate Thomas	Fr
OL	53	AJ Gillie	Fr
OL	54	Tyler Brown	Fr
OL	55	Landon Burton	Fr
OL	58	O'Cyrus Torrence	So
OL	64	Shane Vallot	Jr
OL	65	Carlos Rubio	Jr
OL	67	Ken Marks	Sr
OL	68	T. J. Fiailoa	Jr
OL	70	Jax Harrington	Fr
OL	71	George Jackson	Fr
OL	73	David Hudson	Jr
OL	74	Max Mitchell	Jr
OL	76	Matthew Anderson	Fr
OL	77	King McGowen	Fr
OL	78	Luke Junkunc	So
OL	79	Logan Newell	Fr
WR	80	Devon Pauley	So
TE	82	Rhett Guidry	Fr
TE	83	Damani Burrell	So
WR	84	Leroy Franklin	Sr
WR	85	Noah McCollum	Fr
WR	86	Jacob Bernard	Fr
TE	87	Neal Johnson	So
TE	88	Johnny Lumpkin	Jr
TE	89	Hunter Bergeron	Jr

Defense

Pos.	#	Name	Class
S	0	Kam Pedescleaux	So
LB	2	Lorenzo McCaskill	Jr
S	3	Tyrone Lewis Jr.	Fr
DL	4	Zi'Yon Hill	Jr
LB	6	Kris Moncrief	Jr
LB	7	Ferrod Gardner	Sr
DL	8	Kendall Wilkerson	So
S	9	Percy Butler	Jr
LB	10	Andre Jones Jr.	Jr
CB	11	Caleb Anderson	Fr
S	13	Patrick Mensah	So
LB	15	Ja'Marian Peterson	Fr
CB	16	AJ Washington	Jr
LB	17	Chauncey Manac	Sr
CB	18	Bobby Holmes	Fr
CB	19	Eric Garror	Jr
CB	20	Mekhi Garner	So
CB	21	Trey Amos	Fr
CB	22	Amir McDaniel	Fr
CB	22	Jayrin Wilson	Jr
CB	23	Courtline Flowers	Fr
S	24	Bralen Trahan	Jr
S	25	Brandon Bishop	So
S	26	Blair Brooks	Sr
S	27	Cameron Solomon	Sr
S	28	Ja'Len Johnson	Jr
CB	29	Korian Wilson	Fr
S	30	Grid Isidore Jr.	Jr
S	31	Tyree Skipper	Fr
LB	33	Tyler Guidry	So
S	34	Scottie Johnson	Fr
LB	35	Ahmad Johnson	Fr
LB	36	Clinton Anokwuru	Fr
LB	38	Jasper Williams	So
CB	39	Dabari Hawkins	Fr
LB	40	Anthony Jordan	Jr
S	41	Ty'Darien Quinney	Fr
LB	43	Jourdon Quibodeaux	Jr
LB	44	Tanner Wiggins	Jr
LB	45	Caleb Kibodi	Fr
DL	46	Jordan Lawson	Fr
LB	48	Troy Krutchen	Jr
DL	51	Lakeidrick George Jr.	So
LB	52	Bralyn Richardson	Fr
LB	80	Alex Self	Fr
DL	90	Mason Narcisse	Fr
DL	91	Sonny Hazard	Fr
DL	92	Dominique Ratcliff	Fr
DL	94	Dalvin Hutchinson	So
LB	95	Andre Riley	So
DL	96	Malcolm Rollins	Jr
DL	97	Ja'Quane Nelson	Jr
DL	98	Andre Landry	Jr
DL	99	Tayland Humphrey	Sr

Special teams

Pos.	#	Name	Class
K	36	Nate Snyder	Sr
K	40	Logan Klotz	Fr
K	45	Kenneth Almendares	So
P	47	Rhys Byrns	Jr
LS	49	Paul Boudreaux	Jr
LS	52	James Segrest	Fr
K	84	Thomas Leo	So

Head coach

- Billy Napier (Furman)

Coordinators/assistant coaches

- Michael Desormeaux (Louisiana)
  Co-offensive coordinator/TE
- Tim Leger (McNeese State)
  Co-offensive coordinator/recruiting coordinator/WR
- Patrick Toney (Southeastern Louisiana)
  Defensive coordinator/OLB
- Chris Couch (Georgia Southern)
  Special teams coordinator
- Jabbar Juluke (Southern)
  Running backs
- Tim Leger (McNeese State)
  Recruiting coordinator/WR
- Rory Segrest (Alabama)
  Defensive line
- Jeff Burris (Notre Dame)
  Cornerbacks
- Galen Scott (Illinois State)
  Inside linebackers
- Jeff Norrid (Arkansas)
  Offensive linemen
- Darnell Stapleton (Rutgers)
  Assistant OL
- Wes Neighbors (Alabama)
  Safeties

Legend

- (C) Team captain
- (S) Suspended
- (I) Ineligible
- Injured
- Redshirt

Roster
Last update: 22 April 2021

== Schedule ==
The 2021 schedule consisted of 6 home and 6 away games in the regular season. The Ragin' Cajuns traveled to Sun Belt foes Georgia Southern, South Alabama, Arkansas State, and Troy. The Cajuns would play host to Sun Belt foes Appalachian State, Texas State, Georgia State, and Louisiana–Monroe.

The Ragin' Cajuns would host two of the three non-conference opponents at Cajun Field, Nicholls, from NCAA Division I FCS and Ohio of the Mid-American Conference, and traveled to Texas of the Big 12 and Liberty, a FBS Independent.

Date	Time	Opponent	Rank	Site	TV	Result	Attendance
September 4	3:30 p.m.	at No. 21 Texas*	No. 23	Darrell K Royal–Texas Memorial Stadium; Austin, TX	FOX	L 18–38	91,113
September 11	6:00 p.m.	Nicholls*		Cajun Field; Lafayette, LA	ESPN3	W 27–24	25,417
September 16	7:00 p.m.	Ohio*		Cajun Field; Lafayette, LA	ESPN	W 49–14	17,709
September 25	5:00 p.m.	at Georgia Southern		Paulson Stadium; Statesboro, GA	ESPN+	W 28–20	17,522
October 2	7:00 p.m.	at South Alabama		Hancock Whitney Stadium; Mobile, AL	ESPN+	W 20–18	16,764
October 12	6:30 p.m.	Appalachian State		Cajun Field; Lafayette, LA	ESPN2	W 41–13	20,066
October 21	6:30 p.m.	at Arkansas State		Centennial Bank Stadium; Jonesboro, AR	ESPNU	W 28–27	7,138
October 30	11:00 a.m.	Texas State^{†}		Cajun Field; Lafayette, LA	ESPNU	W 45–0	28,794
November 4	6:30 p.m.	Georgia State		Cajun Field; Lafayette, LA	ESPN	W 21–17	16,007
November 13	2:30 p.m.	at Troy		Veterans Memorial Stadium; Troy, AL	ESPN+	W 35–21	24,738
November 20	3:00 p.m.	at Liberty*		Williams Stadium; Lynchburg, VA	ESPNU	W 42–14	15,564
November 27	3:00 p.m.	Louisiana–Monroe		Cajun Field; Lafayette, LA (Battle on the Bayou)	ESPNU	W 21–16	18,447
December 4	2:30 p.m.	Appalachian State	No. 24	Cajun Field; Lafayette, LA (Sun Belt Championship Game)	ESPN	W 24–16	31,014
December 18	8:15 p.m.	vs. Marshall*	No. 23	Caesars Superdome; New Orleans, LA (New Orleans Bowl)	ESPN	W 36–21	21,642
*Non-conference game; ^{†}Homecoming; Rankings from AP Poll (and CFP Rankings, after November 2) - Released prior to game; All times are in Central time

== Game summaries ==
=== At Texas ===
Louisiana at Texas

Team	1	2	3	4	Total
No. 23 Ragin' Cajuns	3	3	6	6	18
• No. 21 Longhorns	7	7	14	10	38

- Date: September 4, 2021
- Location: Darrell K Royal–Texas Memorial Stadium
  Austin, TX
- Game start: 3:35 p.m. CDT
- Elapsed time: 3 hours and 23 minutes
- Game attendance: 91,113
- Game weather: Sunny
- Referee: Tuta Salaam
- TV announcers (FOX): Tim Brando (play-by-play) and Spencer Tillman (analyst)

Scoring summary
1	08:16	LA	Kenneth Almendares 37-yard field goal (8 plays, 42 yards, 4:16)	LA 3–0
1	02:25	UT	Bijan Robinson 18-yard pass from Hudson Card (Cameron Dicker kick) (11 plays, 70 yards, 5:51)	UT 7–3
2	02:00	UT	Cade Brewer 6-yard pass from Hudson Card (Cameron Dicker kick) (14 plays, 62 yards, 7:45)	UT 14–3
2	00:00	LA	Kenneth Almendares 48-yard field goal (9 plays, 44 yards, 2:00)	UT 14–6
3	11:48	UT	Bijan Robinson 7-yard rush (Cameron Dicker kick) (8 plays, 65 yards, 3:12)	UT 21–6
3	05:50	LA	Chris Smith 27-yard rush (Kenneth Almendares PAT blocked) (12 plays, 79 yards, 5:58)	UT 21–12
3	02:43	UT	Hudson Card 3-yard rush (Cameron Dicker kick) (6 plays, 48 yards, 3:07)	UT 28–12
4	12:24	UT	Jordan Whittington 14-yard pass from Casey Thompson (Cameron Dicker kick) (10 plays, 83 yards, 3:46)	UT 35–12
4	09:31	LA	Kyren Lacy 19-yard pass from Levi Lewis (two-point pass conversion attempt failed) (9 plays, 75 yards, 2:53)	UT 35–18
4	06:16	UT	Cameron Dicker 49-yard field goal (6 plays, 18 yards, 3:15)	UT 38–18

Statistics	Louisiana	Texas
First downs	22	21
Total yards	358	435
Rushing yards	76	170
Passing yards	282	265
Turnovers	1	0
Time of possession	26:47	33:13

Team	Category	Player	Statistics
Louisiana	Passing	Levi Lewis	28/40, 282 yards, 1 TD
Louisiana	Rushing	Chris Smith	11 carries, 54 yards, 1 TD
Louisiana	Receiving	Jalen Williams	5 receptions, 71 yards
Texas	Passing	Hudson Card	14/21, 224 yards, 2 TDs
Texas	Rushing	Bijan Robinson	20 carries, 103 yards, 1 TD
Texas	Receiving	Jordan Whittington	7 receptions, 113 yards, 1 TD

=== Nicholls ===
Nicholls at Louisiana

Team	1	2	3	4	Total
RV (FCS) Colonels	7	3	0	14	24
• RV Ragin' Cajuns	10	7	7	3	27

- Date: September 11, 2021
- Location: Cajun Field
  Lafayette, LA
- Game start: 6:04 p.m. CDT
- Elapsed time: 3 hours and 15 minutes
- Game attendance: 25,417
- Game weather: 85 °F (29 °C) • Weather: Sunny • Wind: NE 5 MPH
- Referee: Trennis Livingston
- TV announcers (ESPN3): Dan McDonald (play–by–play) and Scott Brazda (analyst)

Scoring summary
1	12:10	LA	John Stephens Jr. 14-yard pass from Levi Lewis (Kenneth Almendares kick) (7 plays, 80 yards, 2:46)	LA 7–0
1	10:54	NICH	Dai'Jean Dixon 21-yard pass from Lindsey Scott Jr. (Gavin Lasseigne kick) (3 plays, 25 yards, 1:10)	TIE 7–7
1	08:20	LA	Kenneth Almendares 46-yard field goal (6 plays, 21 yards, 2:26)	LA 10–7
2	05:54	LA	Michael Jefferson 46-yard pass from Levi Lewis (Kenneth Almendares kick) (4 plays, 99 yards, 2:09)	LA 17–7
2	00:36	NICH	Gavin Lasseigne 42-yard field goal (9 plays, 32 yards, 1:38)	LA 17–10
3	00:43	LA	Kris Moncrief 67-yard interception returned (Kenneth Almendares kick) (2 plays, 0 yards, 0:52)	LA 24–10
4	09:29	LA	Kenneth Almendares 28-yard field goal (14 plays, 72 yards, 4:10)	LA 27–10
4	05:03	NICH	K. J. Franklin 20-yard pass from Lindsey Scott Jr. (Gavin Lasseigne kick) (10 plays, 75 yards, 4:26)	LA 27–17
4	00:33	NICH	Dai'Jean Dixon 6-yard pass from Lindsey Scott Jr. (Gavin Lasseigne kick) (7 plays, 81 yards, 1:45)	LA 27–24

Statistics	Nicholls	Louisiana
First downs	24	20
Total yards	511	417
Rushing yards	152	113
Passing yards	359	304
Turnovers	1	1
Time of possession	33:12	26:48

Team	Category	Player	Statistics
Nicholls	Passing	Lindsey Scott Jr.	26/37, 359 yards, 3 TDs, 1 INT
Nicholls	Rushing	Lindsey Scott Jr.	18 carries, 121 yards
Nicholls	Receiving	Dai'Jean Dixon	14 receptions, 198 yards, 2 TDs
Louisiana	Passing	Levi Lewis	19/33, 304 yards, 2 TDs
Louisiana	Rushing	Chris Smith	11 carries, 46 yards
Louisiana	Receiving	Michael Jefferson	3 receptions, 84 yards, 1 TD

=== Ohio ===
Ohio at Louisiana

Team	1	2	3	4	Total
Bobcats	0	7	7	0	14
• Ragin' Cajuns	7	14	7	21	49

- Date: September 18, 2021
- Location: Cajun Field
  Lafayette, LA
- Game start: 7:05 p.m. CDT
- Elapsed time: 3 hours and 32 minutes
- Game attendance: 17,709
- Game weather: 79 °F (26 °C) • Weather: Cloudy • Wind: S 9 MPH
- Referee: Wayne Winkler
- TV announcers (ESPN): Matt Barrie (play–by–play), Roddy Jones (analyst), and Harry Lyles Jr. (sideline reporter)

Scoring summary
1	07:54	LA	John Stephens Jr. 2-yard pass from Levi Lewis (Kenneth Almendares kick) (10 plays, 91 yards, 4:35)	LA 7–0
2	14:19	LA	Montrell Johnson 6-yard rush (Kenneth Almendares kick) (10 plays, 80 yards, 3:34)	LA 14–0
2	02:26	OHIO	O'Shaan Allison 25-yard pass from Kurtis Rourke (Tristian Vandenberg kick) (5 plays, 61 yards, 2:42)	LA 14–7
2	00:00	LA	Montrell Johnson 1-yard rush (Kenneth Almendares kick) (9 plays, 64 yards, 1:14)	LA 21–7
3	10:07	LA	Montrell Johnson 1-yard rush (Kenneth Almendares kick) (10 plays, 78 yards, 4:53)	LA 28–7
3	02:37	OHIO	Ty Walton 21-yard pass from Kurtis Rourke (Tristian Vandenberg kick) (3 plays, 39 yards, 1:16)	LA 28–14
4	11:51	LA	Montrell Johnson 1-yard rush (Kenneth Almendares kick) (9 plays, 68 yards, 3:28)	LA 35–14
4	06:04	LA	Chris Smith 9-yard rush (Kenneth Almendares kick) (9 plays, 79 yards, 4:41)	LA 42–14
4	00:48	LA	John Stephens Jr. 13-yard pass from Chandler Fields (Kenneth Almendares kick) (8 plays, 48 yards, 3:27)	LA 49–14

Statistics	Ohio	Louisiana
First downs	17	33
Total yards	250	562
Rushing yards	112	312
Passing yards	138	250
Turnovers	1	1
Time of possession	26:46	33:14

Team	Category	Player	Statistics
Ohio	Passing	Kurtis Rourke	12/22, 122 yards, 2 TDs
Ohio	Rushing	Armani Rogers	7 carries, 58 yards
Ohio	Receiving	Ty Walton	5 receptions, 50 yards, 1 TD
Louisiana	Passing	Levi Lewis	21/29, 212 yards, 1 TD, 1 INT
Louisiana	Rushing	Montrell Johnson	13 carries, 84 yards, 4 TDs
Louisiana	Receiving	Kaleb Carter	3 receptions, 51 yards

=== At Georgia Southern ===
Louisiana at Georgia Southern

Team	1	2	3	4	Total
• Ragin' Cajuns	0	14	14	0	28
Eagles	7	6	0	7	20

- Date: September 25, 2021
- Location: Paulson Stadium
  Statesboro, GA
- Game start: 5:03 p.m. CDT
- Elapsed time: 3 hours and 29 minutes
- Game attendance: 17,522
- Game weather: 59 °F (15 °C) • Weather: Sunny • Wind: NW 3 MPH
- Referee: Kyle Olson
- TV announcers (ESPN+): Matt Stewart (play–by–play) and Danny Waugh (analyst)

Scoring summary
1	06:39	GASO	Gerald Green 8-yard rush (Alex Raynor kick) (16 plays, 83 yards, 6:12)	GASO 7–0
2	14:52	LA	Michael Jefferson 48-yard pass from Levi Lewis (Kenneth Almendares kick) (6 plays, 85 yards, 2:07)	TIE 7–7
2	08:01	LA	Emani Bailey 3-yard rush (Kenneth Almendares kick) (10 plays, 59 yards, 5:21)	LA 14–7
2	03:21	GASO	Gerald Green 3-yard rush (Alex Raynor PAT blocked) (4 plays, 45 yards, 1:19)	LA 14–13
3	11:01	LA	Johnny Lumpkin 22-yard pass from Levi Lewis (Kenneth Almendares kick) (5 plays, 68 yards, 1:32)	LA 21–13
3	06:52	LA	Dontae Fleming 46-yard pass from Levi Lewis (Kenneth Almendares kick) (5 plays, 92 yards, 1:50)	LA 28–13
4	13:26	GASO	Gerald Green 76-yard rush (Alex Raynor kick) (3 plays, 85 yards, 1:26)	LA 28–20

Statistics	Louisiana	Georgia Southern
First downs	18	23
Total yards	378	453
Rushing yards	129	278
Passing yards	249	175
Turnovers	0	1
Time of possession	27:11	32:49

Team	Category	Player	Statistics
Louisiana	Passing	Levi Lewis	17/28, 249 yards, 3 TDs
Louisiana	Rushing	Montrell Johnson	13 carries, 61 yards
Louisiana	Receiving	Dontae Fleming	4 receptions, 70 yards, 1 TD
Georgia Southern	Passing	Justin Tomlin	11/24, 175 yards, 1 INT
Georgia Southern	Rushing	Gerald Green	18 carries, 186 yards, 3 TDs
Georgia Southern	Receiving	Logan Wright	4 receptions, 85 yards

=== At South Alabama ===
Louisiana at South Alabama

Team	1	2	3	4	Total
• Ragin' Cajuns	14	6	0	0	20
Jaguars	0	6	6	6	18

- Date: October 2, 2021
- Location: Hancock Whitney Stadium
  Mobile, AL
- Game start: 7:00 p.m. CDT
- Elapsed time: 3 hours and 11 minutes
- Game attendance: 16,764
- Game weather: Rainy • Wind: SE 6 MPH
- Referee: Marshall Lewis
- TV announcers (ESPN+): J. D. Byars (play–by–play) and Pat Greenwood (analyst)

Scoring summary
1	14:02	LA	Chris Smith 10-yard rush (Nate Snyder kick) (3 plays, 13 yards, 0:58)	LA 7–0
1	11:10	LA	Levi Lewis 22-yard rush (Nate Snyder kick) (4 plays, 57 yards, 1:24)	LA 14–0
2	11:23	LA	Emani Baileyh 15-yard rush (Nate Snyder PAT failed) (2 plays, 31 yards, 0:42)	LA 20–0
2	01:33	USA	Bryan Hill 1-yard rush (Diego Guajardo PAT blocked) (11 plays, 60 yards, 5:09)	LA 20–6
3	04:20	USA	Bryan Hill 2-yard rush (Diego Guajardo PAT failed) (8 plays, 79 yards, 4:33)	LA 20–12
4	12:51	USA	Jake Bentley 1-yard rush (Jake Bentley two-point conversion pass attempt failed) (10 plays, 55 yards, 4:47)	LA 20–18

Statistics	Louisiana	South Alabama
First downs	17	18
Total yards	283	387
Rushing yards	225	144
Passing yards	58	243
Turnovers	1	0
Time of possession	23:13	36:47

Team	Category	Player	Statistics
Louisiana	Passing	Levi Lewis	9/20, 49 yards
Louisiana	Rushing	Emani Bailey	7 carries, 81 yards, 1 TD
Louisiana	Receiving	Neal Johnson	1 reception, 18 yards
South Alabama	Passing	Jake Bentley	19/29, 243 yards
South Alabama	Rushing	Bryan Hill	22 carries, 81 yards, 2 TDs
South Alabama	Receiving	Jalen Tolbert	6 receptions, 143 yards

=== Appalachian State ===
Appalachian State at Louisiana

Team	1	2	3	4	Total
RV Mountaineers	3	3	7	0	13
• Ragin' Cajuns	20	0	7	14	41

- Date: October 12, 2021
- Location: Cajun Field
  Lafayette, LA
- Game start: 6:35 p.m. CDT
- Elapsed time: 3 hours and 19 minutes
- Game attendance: 20,066
- Game weather: 84 °F (29 °C) • Weather: Sunny • Wind: S 9 MPH
- Referee: Jeremy Parker
- TV announcers (ESPN2): Chris Cotter (play-by-play) and Cole Cubelic (analyst)

Scoring summary
1	10:45	LA	Levi Lewis 3-yard rush (Nate Snyder kick) (8 plays, 75 yards, 4:15)	LA 7–0
1	05:58	APP	Chandler Staton 31-yard field goal (10 plays, 62 yards, 4:47)	LA 7–3
1	03:32	LA	Kyren Lacy 2-yard pass from Levi Lewis (Nate Snyder kick) (6 plays, 87 yards, 2:36)	LA 14–3
1	00:13	LA	Chris Smith 1-yard rush *(Nate Snyder PAT failed) (4 plays, 31 yards, 2:12)	LA 20–3
2	00:44	APP	Chandler Staton 27-yard field goal (10 plays, 70 yards, 2:51)	LA 20–6
3	13:11	LA	Chris Smith 21-yard rush (Nate Snyder kick) (2 plays, 19 yards, 0:46)	LA 27–6
3	08:19	APP	Chase Brice 5-yard rush (Chandler Staton kick) (12 plays, 51 yards, 4:52)	LA 27–13
4	10:38	LA	Montrell Johnson 2-yard rush (Nate Snyder kick) (13 plays, 98 yards, 7:54)	LA 34–13
4	08:16	LA	Emani Bailey 26-yard rush (Nate Snyder kick) (4 plays, 39 yards, 2:11)	LA 41–13

Statistics	Appalachian State	Louisiana
First downs	15	23
Total yards	211	455
Rushing yards	78	246
Passing yards	133	209
Turnovers	4	1
Time of possession	23:28	36:32

Team	Category	Player	Statistics
Appalachian State	Passing	Chase Brice	15/26, 133 yards, 2 INTs
Appalachian State	Rushing	Nate Noel	17 carries, 44 yards
Appalachian State	Receiving	Malik Williams	6 receptions, 38 yards
Louisiana	Passing	Levi Lewis	15/25, 209 yards, 1 TD, 1 INT
Louisiana	Rushing	Montrell Johnson	14 carries, 103 yards, 1 TD
Louisiana	Receiving	Kyren Lacy	2 receptions, 57 yards, 1 TD

=== At Arkansas State ===
Louisiana at Arkansas State

Team	1	2	3	4	Total
• RV Ragin' Cajuns	0	14	14	0	28
Red Wolves	0	10	17	0	27

- Date: October 21, 2021
- Location: Centennial Bank Stadium
  Jonesboro, AR
- Game start: 6:33 p.m. CDT
- Elapsed time: 3 hours and 30 minutes
- Game attendance: 7,138
- Game weather: 68 °F (20 °C) • Weather: Sunny • Wind: NW 8 MPH
- Referee: Kyle Olson
- TV announcers (ESPNU): Lowell Galindo (play–by–play) and Rene Ingoglia (analyst)

Scoring summary
2	05:38	ARST	Corey Rucker 6-yard pass from Layne Hatcher (Blake Grupe kick) (13 plays, 94 yards, 5:44)	ARST 7–0
2	05:19	LA	Montrell Johnson 99-yard rush (Nate Snyder kick) (1 play, 99 yards, 0:19)	TIE 7–7
2	02:21	ARST	Blake Grupe 32-yard field goal (10 plays, 66 yards, 2:58)	ARST 10–7
2	00:28	LA	Chris Smith 6-yard rush (Nate Snyder kick) (9 plays, 80 yards, 1:53)	LA 14–10
3	14:07	ARST	Te'Vailance Hunt 76-yard pass from Layne Hatcher (Blake Grupe kick) (2 plays, 80 yards, 0:53)	ARST 17–14
3	12:35	LA	Montrell Johnson 3-yard rush (Nate Snyder kick) (5 plays, 75 yards, 1:32)	LA 21–17
3	09:05	ARST	Emmanuel Stevenson 15-yard pass from Layne Hatcher (Blake Grupe kick) (3 plays, 51 yards, 0:57)	ARST 24–21
3	03:23	ARST	Blake Grupe 35-yard field goal (6 plays, 12 yards, 2:16)	ARST 27–21
3	02:37	LA	Chris Smith 74-yard rush (Nate Snyder kick) (2 plays, 80 yards, 0:46)	LA 28–27

Statistics	Louisiana	Arkansas State
First downs	26	22
Total yards	546	413
Rushing yards	424	113
Passing yards	122	300
Turnovers	2	0
Time of possession	32:47	27:13

Team	Category	Player	Statistics
Louisiana	Passing	Levi Lewis	11/20, 122 yards, 1 INT
Louisiana	Rushing	Chris Smith	24 carries, 238 yards, 2 TDs
Louisiana	Receiving	Dontae Fleming	2 receptions, 47 yards
Arkansas State	Passing	Layne Hatcher	16/31, 300 yards, 3 TDs
Arkansas State	Rushing	Lincoln Pare	11 carries, 52 yards
Arkansas State	Receiving	Te'Vailance Hunt	3 receptions, 83 yards, 1 TD

=== Texas State ===
Texas State at Louisiana

Team	1	2	3	4	Total
Bobcats	0	0	0	0	0
• RV Ragin' Cajuns	0	17	18	10	45

- Date: October 30, 2021
- Location: Cajun Field
  Lafayette, LA
- Game start: 11:02 a.m. CDT
- Elapsed time: 3 hours and 5 minutes
- Game attendance: 28,794
- Game weather: 65 °F (18 °C) • Weather: Sunny • Wind: NW 9 MPH
- Referee: Trennis Livingston
- TV announcers (ESPNU): Kevin Brown (play–by–play) and Hutson Mason (analyst)

Scoring summary
2	14:55	LA	Chris Smith 2-yard pass from Levi Lewis (Nate Snyder kick) (14 plays, 68 yards, 5:25)	LA 7–0
2	03:06	LA	Hunter Bergeron 1-yard pass from Levi Lewis (Nate Snyder kick) (7 plays, 63 yards, 3:21)	LA 14–0
2	00:01	LA	Nate Snyder 45-yard field goal (7 plays, 41 yards, 1:51)	LA 17–0
3	11:38	LA	Nate Snyder 32-yard field goal (8 plays, 60 yards, 3:22)	LA 20–0
3	04:50	LA	Jalen Williams 3-yard pass from Levi Lewis (Levi Lewis two-point conversion pass to Peter LeBlanc) (6 plays, 51 yards, 2:19)	LA 28–0
3	01:10	LA	Chris Smith 3-yard rush (Nate Snyder kick) (6 plays, 54 yards, 2:02)	LA 35–0
4	14:44	LA	Nate Snyder 37-yard field goal (4 plays, -8 yards, 0:28)	LA 38–0
4	00:59	LA	T. J. Wisham 3-yard rush (Nate Snyder kick) (13 plays, 88 yards, 7:58)	LA 45–0

Statistics	Texas State	Louisiana
First downs	10	24
Total yards	205	425
Rushing yards	163	165
Passing yards	42	260
Turnovers	3	0
Time of possession	28:47	31:13

Team	Category	Player	Statistics
Texas State	Passing	Tyler Vitt	6/13, 42 yards, 1 INT
Texas State	Rushing	Tyler Vitt	15 carries, 94 yards
Texas State	Receiving	Marcell Barbee	1 reception, 17 yards
Louisiana	Passing	Levi Lewis	22/32, 228 yards, 3 TDs
Louisiana	Rushing	Chris Smith	9 carries, 70 yards, 1 TD
Louisiana	Receiving	Errol Rogers Jr.	3 receptions, 44 yards

=== Georgia State ===
Georgia State at Louisiana

Team	1	2	3	4	Total
Panthers	3	0	7	7	17
• Ragin' Cajuns	0	0	7	14	21

- Date: November 4, 2021
- Location: Cajun Field
  Lafayette, LA
- Game start: 6:36 p.m. CDT
- Elapsed time: 3 hours and 7 minutes
- Game attendance: 16,007
- Game weather: 54 °F (12 °C) • Weather: Cloudy • Wind: N 11 MPH
- Referee: Marshall Lewis
- TV announcers (ESPN): Matt Barrie (play–by–play), Roddy Jones (analyst) and Alex Chappell (sideline reporter)

Scoring summary
1	05:05	GSU	Noel Ruiz 39-yard field goal (12 plays, 71 yards, 5:15)	GSU 3–0
3	08:46	GSU	Roger Carter 37-yard pass from Darren Grainger (Noel Ruiz kick) (3 plays, 52 yards, 0:54)	GSU 10–0
3	02:49	LA	Peter LeBlanc 13-yard pass from Levi Lewis (Nate Snyder kick) (12 plays, 75 yards, 5:57)	GSU 10–7
4	13:11	LA	Montrell Johnson 3-yard rush (Nate Snyder kick) (6 plays, 51 yards, 2:24)	LA 14–10
4	05:25	GSU	Tucker Gregg 1-yard rush (Noel Ruiz kick) (16 plays, 76 yards, 7:46)	GSU 17–14
4	02:32	LA	Montrell Johnson 13-yard rush (Nate Snyder kick) (8 plays, 71 yards, 2:53)	LA 21–17

Statistics	Georgia State	Louisiana
First downs	20	21
Total yards	307	430
Rushing yards	209	143
Passing yards	98	287
Turnovers	0	1
Time of possession	28:46	31:14

Team	Category	Player	Statistics
Georgia State	Passing	Darren Grainger	8/19, 98 yards, 1 TD
Georgia State	Rushing	Tucker Gregg	23 carries, 99 yards, 1 TD
Georgia State	Receiving	Roger Carter	3 receptions, 76 yards, 1 TD
Louisiana	Passing	Levi Lewis	19/34, 287 yards, 1 TD, 1 INT
Louisiana	Rushing	Montrell Johnson	17 carries, 98 yards, 2 TDs
Louisiana	Receiving	Peter LeBlanc	9 receptions, 118 yards, 1 TD

=== At Troy ===
Louisiana at Troy

Team	1	2	3	4	Total
• Ragin' Cajuns	14	0	14	7	35
Trojans	10	3	0	8	21

- Date: November 13, 2021
- Location: Veterans Memorial Stadium
  Troy, AL
- Game start: 2:35 p.m. CST
- Elapsed time: 3 hours and 34 minutes
- Game attendance: 24,738
- Game weather: 59 °F (15 °C) • Weather: Sunny • Wind: SE 11 MPH
- Referee: Kyle Olson
- TV announcers (ESPN+): Will Kollmeyer (play–by–play) and Ben Stanfield (analyst)

Scoring summary
1	12:25	TROY	Gunnar Watson 10-yard rush (Brooks Buce kick) (8 plays, 75 yards, 2:35)	TROY 7–0
1	07:52	LA	Dontae Fleming 15-yard pass from Levi Lewis (Nate Snyder kick) (9 plays, 79 yards, 4:33)	TIE 7–7
1	02:12	TROY	Brooks Buce 30-yard field goal (14 plays, 62 yards, 5:40)	TROY 10–7
1	01:00	LA	Michael Jefferson 52-yard pass from Levi Lewis (Nate Snyder kick) (3 plays, 67 yards, 1:12)	LA 14–10
2	04:20	TROY	Brooks Buce 47-yard field goal (11 plays, 52 yards, 5:09)	LA 14–13
3	11:31	LA	Kyren Lacy 13-yard pass from Levi Lewis (Nate Snyder kick) (6 plays, 63 yards, 3:29)	LA 21–13
3	06:03	LA	Levi Lewis 27-yard rush (Nate Snyder kick) (10 plays, 52 yards, 4:05)	LA 28–13
4	14:13	TROY	Tez Johnson 7-yard pass from Gunnar Watson (Gunnar Watson two-point conversion pass to Deshon Stoudemire) (15 plays, 82 yards, 3:52)	LA 28–21
4	05:15	LA	Montrell Johnson 6-yard rush (Nate Snyder kick) (8 plays, 51 yards, 4:37)	LA 35–21

Statistics	Louisiana	Troy
First downs	19	22
Total yards	370	391
Rushing yards	204	41
Passing yards	166	350
Turnovers	0	3
Time of possession	31:56	28:04

Team	Category	Player	Statistics
Louisiana	Passing	Levi Lewis	14/22, 166 yards, 3 TDs
Louisiana	Rushing	Chris Smith	15 carries, 102 yards
Louisiana	Receiving	Michael Jefferson	2 receptions, 71 yards, 1 TD
Troy	Passing	Gunnar Watson	29/55, 350 yards, 1 TD, 1 INT
Troy	Rushing	Kimani Vidal	11 carries, 21 yards
Troy	Receiving	Tez Johnson	6 receptions, 83 yards, 1 TD

=== At Liberty ===
Louisiana at Liberty

Team	1	2	3	4	Total
• Ragin' Cajuns	7	14	7	14	42
Flames	0	7	7	0	14

- Date: November 20, 2021
- Location: Williams Stadium
  Lynchburg, VA
- Game start: 3:02 p.m. CST
- Elapsed time: 3 hours and 20 minutes
- Game attendance: 15,564
- Game weather: 48 °F (9 °C) • Weather: Sunny • Wind: S 3 MPH
- Referee: Wayne Winkler
- TV announcers (ESPNU): Kevin Brown (play–by–play) and Hutson Mason (analyst)

Scoring summary
1	01:57	LA	John Stephens Jr. 4-yard pass from Levi Lewis (Nate Snyder kick) (10 plays, 41 yards, 3:43)	LA 7–0
2	14:19	LA	Kyren Lacy 15-yard pass from Levi Lewis (Nate Snyder kick) (3 plays, 56 yards, 0:50)	LA 14–0
2	09:06	LA	Dalen Cambre 26-yard fumble returned (Nate Snyder kick) (5 plays, -6 yards, 1:48)	LA 21–0
2	07:14	LIB	Kevin Shaa 29-yard pass from Malik Willis (Brayden Beck kick) (6 plays, 78 yards, 1:46)	LA 21–7
3	11:57	LIB	Kevin Shaa 30-yard pass from Malik Willis (Brayden Beck kick) (3 plays, 40 yards, 1:18)	LA 21–14
3	07:44	LA	Montrell Johnson 2-yard rush (Nate Snyder kick) (8 plays, 74 yards, 4:03)	LA 28–14
4	14:11	LA	Neal Johnson 2-yard pass from Levi Lewis (Nate Snyder kick) (6 plays, 65 yards, 2:22)	LA 35–14
4	02:26	LA	Emani Bailey 2-yard rush (Nate Snyder kick) (12 plays, 66 yards, 7:58)	LA 42–14

Statistics	Louisiana	Liberty
First downs	17	16
Total yards	296	293
Rushing yards	130	87
Passing yards	166	206
Turnovers	0	6
Time of possession	30:49	28:01

Team	Category	Player	Statistics
Louisiana	Passing	Levi Lewis	14/25, 166 yards, 3 TDs
Louisiana	Rushing	Emani Bailey	13 carries, 60 yards, 1 TD
Louisiana	Receiving	Peter LeBlanc	2 receptions, 38 yards
Liberty	Passing	Malik Willis	14/34, 162 yards, 2 TDs, 2 INTs
Liberty	Rushing	T. J. Green	4 carries, 56 yards
Liberty	Receiving	Kevin Shaa	3 receptions, 72 yards, 2 TDs

=== Louisiana–Monroe ===
Louisiana–Monroe at Louisiana

Team	1	2	3	4	Total
Warhawks	3	7	0	6	16
• Ragin' Cajuns	14	0	7	0	21

- Date: November 27, 2021
- Location: Cajun Field
  Lafayette, LA
- Game start: 3:02 p.m. CST
- Elapsed time: 3 hours and 6 minutes
- Game attendance: 18,447
- Game weather: 56 °F (13 °C) • Weather: Rain • Wind: NW 1 MPH
- Referee: William Bonet
- TV announcers (ESPNU): Clay Matvick (play–by–play), Rocky Boiman (analyst), and Tiffany Blackmon (sideline reporter)

Scoring summary
1	14:20	LA	Levi Lewis 20-yard rush (Nate Snyder kick) (2 plays, 75 yards, 0:40)	LA 7–0
1	07:33	ULM	Calum Sutherland 26-yard field goal (15 plays, 66 yards, 6:47)	LA 7–3
1	03:48	LA	Kyren Lacy 37-yard pass from Chris Smith (Nate Snyder kick) (8 plays, 75 yards, 3:45)	LA 14–3
2	12:29	ULM	Boogie Knight 46-yard pass from Rhett Rodriguez (Calum Sutherland kick) (5 plays, 62 yards, 1:39)	LA 14–10
3	05:01	LA	Emani Bailey 2-yard rush (Nate Snyder kick) (4 plays, 85 yards, 1:56)	LA 21–10
4	01:35	ULM	Malik Jackson 12-yard rush (two-point pass conversion attempt failed) (11 plays, 71 yards, 2:14)	LA 21–16

Statistics	Louisiana–Monroe	Louisiana
First downs	20	17
Total yards	325	382
Rushing yards	164	165
Passing yards	161	217
Turnovers	1	0
Time of possession	30:32	29:28

Team	Category	Player	Statistics
Louisiana–Monroe	Passing	Rhett Rodriguez	11/24, 145 yards, 1 TD
Louisiana–Monroe	Rushing	Malik Jackson	23 carries, 112 yards, 1 TD
Louisiana–Monroe	Receiving	Boogie Knight	2 receptions, 47 yards, 1 TD
Louisiana	Passing	Levi Lewis	13/22, 163 yards
Louisiana	Rushing	Montrell Johnson	5 carries, 62 yards
Louisiana	Receiving	Neal Johnson	3 receptions, 80 yards

=== Appalachian State (SBC Championship) ===
Appalachian State at Louisiana

Team	1	2	3	4	Total
Mountaineers	0	7	3	6	16
• No. 24 Ragin' Cajuns	7	10	0	7	24

- Date: December 4, 2021
- Location: Cajun Field
  Lafayette, LA
- Game start: 2:40 p.m. CST
- Elapsed time: 3 hours and 45 minutes
- Game attendance: 31,014
- Game weather: 79 °F (26 °C) • Weather: Sunny • Wind: NW 3 MPH
- Referee: Kyle Olson
- TV announcers (ESPN): Dave Pasch (play–by–play), Dusty Dvoracek (analyst), and Tom Luginbill (sideline reporter)

Scoring summary
1	09:55	LA	Michael Jefferson 27-yard pass from Levi Lewis (Nate Snyder kick) (9 plays, 75 yards, 5:05)	LA 7–0
2	09:22	LA	Levi Lewis 56-yard rush (Nate Snyder kick) (7 plays, 92 yards, 1:56)	LA 14–0
2	02:38	APP	Camerun Peoples 43-yard rush (Chandler Staton kick) (6 plays, 75 yards, 2:39)	LA 14–7
2	00:01	LA	Nate Snyder 33-yard field goal (5 plays, 38 yards, 0:31)	LA 17–7
3	08:06	APP	Chandler Staton 36-yard field goal (15 plays, 57 yards, 6:54)	LA 17–10
4	12:14	LA	Emani Bailey 35-yard rush (Nate Snyder kick) (7 plays, 72 yards, 2:36)	LA 24–10
4	05:06	APP	Thomas Hennigan 24-yard pass from Chase Brice (two-point pass conversion attempt failed) (12 plays, 83 yards, 3:10)	LA 24–16

Statistics	Appalachian State	Louisiana
First downs	18	20
Total yards	290	398
Rushing yards	171	188
Passing yards	119	210
Turnovers	1	0
Time of possession	27:23	32:37

Team	Category	Player	Statistics
Appalachian State	Passing	Chase Brice	12/30, 119 yards, 1 TD
Appalachian State	Rushing	Camerun Peoples	8 carries, 61 yards, 1 TD
Appalachian State	Receiving	Thomas Hennigan	6 receptions, 71 yards, 1 TD
Louisiana	Passing	Levi Lewis	15/30, 210 yards, 1 TD
Louisiana	Rushing	Emani Bailey	14 carries, 114 yards, 1 TD
Louisiana	Receiving	Peter LeBlanc	4 receptions, 67 yards

=== Vs. Marshall (New Orleans Bowl) ===
Marshall vs. Louisiana

Team	1	2	3	4	Total
• No. 23 Ragin' Cajuns	10	6	0	20	36
Thundering Herd	7	7	7	0	21

- Date: December 18, 2021
- Location: Caesars Superdome
  New Orleans, LA
- Game start: 8:15 p.m. CST
- Elapsed time: 3 hours and 33 minutes
- Game attendance: 21,642
- Game weather: N/A (indoors)
- Referee: Mike Cuttone
- TV announcers (ESPN): Anish Shroff (play–by–play), Mike Golic Jr. (analyst), and Taylor McGregor (sideline reporter)

Scoring summary
1	09:26	LA	Kyren Lacy 9-yard pass from Levi Lewis (Nate Snyder kick) (13 plays, 81 yards, 5:34)	LA 7–0
1	01:29	LA	Nate Snyder 42-yard field goal (13 plays, 40 yards, 6:35)	LA 10–0
1	00:50	MRSH	Rasheen Ali 63-yard rush (Shane Ciucci kick) (3 plays, 75 yards, 0:39)	LA 10–7
2	10:32	MRSH	Rasheen Ali 14-yard rush (Shane Ciucci kick) (3 plays, 58 yards, 1:10)	MRSH 14–10
2	01:28	LA	Nate Snyder 25-yard field goal (8 plays, 75 yards, 4:27)	MRSH 14–13
2	00:00	LA	Nate Snyder 24-yard field goal (5 plays, 39 yards, 0:43)	LA 16–14
3	01:01	MRSH	Rasheen Ali 9-yard rush (Shane Ciucci kick) (13 plays, 63 yards, 4:20)	MRSH 21–16
4	08:20	LA	Emani Bailey 4-yard rush (two-point pass conversion attempt failed) (8 plays, 68 yards, 3:34)	LA 22–21
4	03:54	LA	Montrell Johnson 3-yard rush (Nate Snyder kick) (6 plays, 73 yards, 2:34)	LA 29–21
4	01:41	LA	Emani Bailey 2-yard rush (Nate Snyder kick) (6 plays, 52 yards, 1:45)	LA 36–21

Statistics	Louisiana	Marshall
First downs	23	13
Total yards	498	286
Rushing yards	220	187
Passing yards	278	99
Turnovers	0	2
Time of possession	37:26	22:34

Team	Category	Player	Statistics
Louisiana	Passing	Levi Lewis	19/31, 270 yards, 1 TD
Louisiana	Rushing	Emani Bailey	17 carries, 94 yards, 2 TDs
Louisiana	Receiving	Michael Jefferson	3 receptions, 108 yards
Marshall	Passing	Grant Wells	15/26, 99 yards, 1 INT
Marshall	Rushing	Rasheen Ali	20 carries, 160 yards, 3 TDs
Marshall	Receiving	Corey Gammage	9 receptions, 50 yards

== Rankings ==
Ranking movements Legend: ██ Increase in ranking ██ Decrease in ranking — = Not ranked RV = Received votes
	Week															
Poll	Pre	1	2	3	4	5	6	7	8	9	10	11	12	13	14	Final
AP	23	RV	—	—	—	—	—	—	RV	24	24	22	23	20	16	16
Coaches	23	RV	RV	RV	RV	RV	RV	RV	RV	RV	25	21	23	21	17	18
CFP	Not released									—	—	—	—	24	23	Not released
