= Atomix =

Atomix may refer to:

- Atomix (video game), a 1990 computer puzzle game
- Atomix (Ben 10), a character from the TV show Ben 10: Omniverse
- Atomix (restaurant), a Korean restaurant in Rose Hill, Manhattan
- Atomix, a Mexican video-gaming magazine founded Jorge Alor

== See also ==
- Atomics (disambiguation)
