= 2021 Sun Belt Conference Football Championship Game =

- 3rd SBC Championship Game
Appalachian State Mountaineers	Louisiana Ragin' Cajuns
(10–2)	(11–1)
16	24
Head coach: Shawn Clark	Head coach: Billy Napier
	AP / Coaches / CFP; 20 / 21 / 24
	1	2	3	4	Total
Appalachian State	0	7	3	6	16
Louisiana	7	10	0	7	24
- Date: December 4, 2021
- Season: 2021
- Stadium: Cajun Field
- Location: Lafayette, Louisiana
- MVP: QB Levi Lewis, Louisiana
- Favorite: Appalachian State by 2.5
- Referee: Kyle Olsen
- Attendance: 31,014

United States TV coverage
- Network: ESPN
- Announcers: Dave Pasch (play by play), Dusty Dvoracek (color), Tom Luginbill (sideline)

2021 Sun Belt Conference football standings
	Conf.			Overall
Team	W		L	W		L
East Division
Appalachian State xy	7	–	1	10	–	4
Georgia State	6	–	2	8	–	5
Coastal Carolina	6	–	2	11	–	2
Troy	3	–	5	5	–	7
Georgia Southern	2	–	6	3	–	9
West Division
No. 16 Louisiana xy$	8	–	0	13	–	1
Texas State	3	–	5	4	–	8
Louisiana–Monroe	2	–	6	4	–	8
South Alabama	2	–	6	5	–	7
Arkansas State	1	–	7	2	–	10
Championship: Louisiana 24, Appalachian State 16
$ – Conference champion; x – Division champion/co-champions; y – Championship game participant; Rankings from AP Poll

The 2021 Sun Belt Conference Football Championship Game was a college football game played on December 4, 2021, at Cajun Field in Lafayette, Louisiana. It was the third edition of the Sun Belt Conference Football Championship Game and determined the champion of the Sun Belt Conference for the 2021 season. The game began at 2:40 p.m. CST and aired on ESPN. The game featured the Appalachian State Mountaineers, the East Division champions, and the Louisiana Ragin' Cajuns, the West Division champions. Sponsored by tire company Hercules Tires, the game was officially known as the 2021 Hercules Tires Sun Belt Football Championship.

== Previous season ==
The 2020 Sun Belt Conference Football Championship Game was set to have Coastal Carolina face Louisiana. However the game was cancelled due to a positive COVID-19 test in the Coastal Carolina program.

== Teams ==
Appalachian State and Louisiana have faced each other in every other Sun Belt Championship Game held. Since the move to divisions, Appalachian State has won Sun Belt's East Division three times, while Louisiana has won the West four times. Appalachian State has won both previous matchups in the Championship Game. This was the first Sun Belt Championship held in Lafayette, Louisiana where the attendance record for Sun Belt Football Championship games was broken with 31,014 total in attendance.

=== Appalachian State ===
Appalachian State clinched a spot in the Sun Belt title game following their 45–7 win over Troy.

=== Louisiana ===
Louisiana clinched a spot in the Sun Belt title game following their 21–17 win over Georgia State.

== Game summary ==
2021 Hercules Tires Sun Belt Football Championship Game

Quarter	1	2	3	4	Total
Appalachian State	0	7	3	6	16
No. 24 Louisiana	7	10	0	7	24

at Cajun Field • Lafayette, Louisiana

- Date: December 4, 2021
- Game time: 2:40 p.m. CST
- Game weather: 79 °F (26 °C) • Sunny • Wind: 3 mph (4.8 km/h) northwest
- Game attendance: 31,014
- Referee: Kyle Olson
- TV: ESPN
- Box score

Scoring summary

Quarter	Time	Drive			Team	Scoring information	Score	
Quarter	Time	Plays	Yards	TOP	Team	Scoring information	Appalachian State	Louisiana
1	9:55	9	75	5:05	Louisiana	Michael Jefferson 27-yard touchdown reception from Levi Lewis, Nate Snyder kick good	0	7
2	9:22	7	92	1:56	Louisiana	Levi Lewis 56-yard touchdown run, Nate Snyder kick good	0	14
2	2:38	6	75	2:39	Appalachian State	Camerun Peoples 43-yard touchdown run, Chandler Staton kick good	7	14
2	0:01	5	38	0:31	Louisiana	33-yard field goal by Nate Snyder	7	17
3	8:06	15	57	6:54	Appalachian State	36-yard field goal by Chandler Staton	10	17
4	12:14	7	72	2:36	Louisiana	Emani Bailey 35-yard touchdown run, Nate Snyder kick good	10	24
4	5:06	12	83	3:10	Appalachian State	Thomas Hennigan 24-yard touchdown reception from Chase Brice, 2-point pass failed	16	24
"TOP" = time of possession. For other American football terms, see Glossary of American football.								

=== Statistics ===
Statistics	APP	LA
First downs	18	20
Plays–yards	64–290	73–398
Rushes–yards	34–171	41–188
Passing yards	119	210
Passing: comp–att–int	12–30–0	15–32–0
Time of possession	27:23	32:37

Team	Category	Player	Statistics
Appalachian State	Passing	Chase Brice	12/30, 119 yards, 1 TD
Appalachian State	Rushing	Camerun Peoples	8 carries, 61 yards, 1 TD
Appalachian State	Receiving	Thomas Hennigan	6 receptions, 71 yards, 1 TD
Louisiana	Passing	Levi Lewis	15/30, 210 yards, 1 TD
Louisiana	Rushing	Emani Bailey	14 carries, 117 yards, 1 TD
Louisiana	Receiving	Peter LeBlanc	4 receptions, 67 yards
