= Atomics =

Atomics can refer to:

- Atomics (comics), superhero team created by Mike Allred
- Atomics (Dune), nuclear weapons in the Dune universe
- Atomic instructions, CPU operations that guarantee all-or-nothing behavior, even when multithreading or interrupts are involved

== See also ==
- Atomic physics
- Atomix (disambiguation)
- Nuclear physics
