= Emani Bailey =

American football player (born 2001)

No. 25 – BC Lions
- Position: Running back / Return specialist
- Roster status: Active
- CFL status: American

Personal information
- Born: November 28, 2001 (age 24); Dallas, Texas, U.S.
- Listed height: 5 ft 7 in (1.70 m)
- Listed weight: 200 lb (91 kg)

Career information
- High school: Billy Ryan (Denton, Texas)
- College: Louisiana (2020–2021); TCU (2022–2023)
- NFL draft: 2024: undrafted

Career history
- Kansas City Chiefs (2024)*; Carolina Panthers (2024)*; San Antonio Toros (2026)*; BC Lions (2026–present)
- * Offseason or practice squad member only
- Stats at Pro Football Reference

Emani Bailey (born November 28, 2001) is an American professional football running back and return specialist for the BC Lions of the Canadian Football League (CFL). He played college football for the Louisiana Ragin' Cajuns and TCU Horned Frogs.

== Early life ==
Bailey attended Billy Ryan High School in Denton, Texas. During his career, he rushed for 4,026 yards and 51 touchdowns. He committed to the University of Louisiana to play college football.

== College career ==
As a true freshman at Louisiana in 2020, he rushed for 60 yards on 10 carries over five games. As a sophomore in 2021, he played in 11 games and had 102 carries for 642 yards and eight touchdowns. After the season, he entered the transfer portal, and transferred to Texas Christian University (TCU). In his first year at TCU, he was the third running back behind Kendre Miller and Emari Demercado and had 31 carries for 250 yards and two touchdowns over 14 games. Bailey took over as TCU's starting running back in 2023.

== Professional career ==
Pre-draft measurables
Height	Weight	Arm length	Hand span	Wingspan	40-yard dash	10-yard split	20-yard split	20-yard shuttle	Three-cone drill	Vertical jump	Broad jump
5 ft 7 3/8 in (1.71 m)	202 lb (92 kg)	29 7/8 in (0.76 m)	9 3/4 in (0.25 m)	5 ft 10 3/4 in (1.80 m)	4.58 s	1.58 s	2.67 s	4.50 s	7.28 s	34.5 in (0.88 m)	9 ft 8 in (2.95 m)
All values from NFL Combine/Pro Day

=== Kansas City Chiefs ===
Bailey was signed by the Kansas City Chiefs as an undrafted free agent after the 2024 NFL draft. He was also selected by the Birmingham Stallions in the third round of the 2024 UFL draft on July 17. He was waived on August 27, 2024, and re-signed to the practice squad. He was released on November 6.

=== Carolina Panthers ===
On December 3, 2024, Bailey signed with the Carolina Panthers practice squad. He signed a reserve/future contract with Carolina on January 6, 2025. On August 25, Bailey was waived by the Panthers.

San Antonio Toros

On February 5, 2026, it was announced that Bailey had signed with the San Antonio Toros of the Continental Football League (COFL).

=== BC Lions ===
On March 18, 2026, Bailey left the Toros to sign with the BC Lions of the Canadian Football League (CFL). On May 31, 2026, Bailey was assigned to the Lions' practice roster to start the 2026 CFL season. On July 30, 2026, Bailey was promoted to the Lions' active roster. He was reassigned to the practice roster on August 7, 2026. On September 12, 2026, Bailey was again promoted to the Lions' active roster. He was again reassigned to the practice roster on September 24, 2026. On October 22, 2026, Bailey was, for the third time that season, promoted to the Lions' active roster. On October 30, 2026, Bailey was assigned to the Lions' reserve roster ahead of the Western Semi-Final and he remained there to end the 2026 CFL season.

== Personal life ==
His brother, Jordyn is also a member of TCU's football team.
