= Jorge Alor =

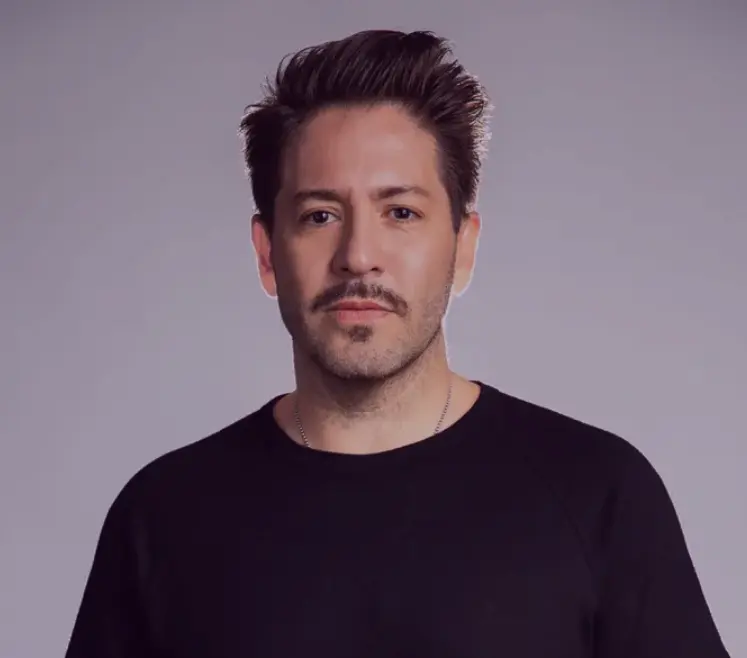
- Occupations: Entrepreneur, editor, cultural producer
- Employer(s): BNN; OCESA (Gamers Unite)
- Awards: IAB MIXX Mexico (2025); TikTok Ad Awards (2024); Aspid Awards (2019–2020); EY Entrepreneur Of The Year Mexico finalist (2018)

Jorge Alor is a Mexican entrepreneur and editor noted for his pioneering role in digital culture and the gaming industry in Mexico. He founded the magazines Sputnik, Atomix and Sonika; created and directed the music festival Manifest – Festival Internacional; founded and is CEO of BNN; leads Gamers Unite (an OCESA unit focused on gaming); and co-hosts the technology podcast Mundo Futuro.

== Editorial career ==
In 1998, Alor launched Sputnik, a Spanish-language magazine focused on cyberculture and the social impact of the Internet. In 1999 he co-founded Atomix, a multiplatform gaming magazine that later transitioned into a digital portal. In 2001 he created Sonika, a magazine initially focused on electronic music that later expanded to alternative music scenes.

== Music industry and festivals ==
Alor created and directed Manifest – Festival Internacional (2000–2008), an independent music festival in Mexico that featured international and local artists. Press coverage lists him as director and coordinator of the festival and documents lineups including bands such as Interpol.

== Digital marketing ==
In 2008 Alor founded BNN (Banana), a Mexico City-based digital marketing agency focused on innovation, technology and data-driven campaigns.

== Gaming and entertainment ==
Since 2025, Alor hasbeen general director of Gamers Unite at OCESA, promoting developer events and independent gaming festivals, including SUPERNOVA Indie Games Fest

== Podcast ==
Alor is co-host of Mundo Futuro, a weekly technology podcast that covers topics such as artificial intelligence, robotics, extended reality and energy. The show launched in 2021

== Awards and recognition ==
- IAB MIXX Mexico Awards 2025 – Bronze (Content for User Engagement) for the campaign “Dilo con OXXO” (BNN / OXXO).
- TikTok Ad Awards Mexico 2024 – Gold (Best Performance Campaign) for “Caja misteriosa – Purina Dog Chow”.
- Aspid Awards (Mexico) 2019–2020 – Golds for campaigns including “Nutrición para Expertos” and “MedForum [Entre médicos]”.
- EY Entrepreneur Of The Year Mexico 2018 – Finalist (Jorge Alor, BNN).
- Editorial recognitions linked to Sputnik, including Quórum and CANIEM awards.
