= Kyren Lacy =

American football player (2000–2025)

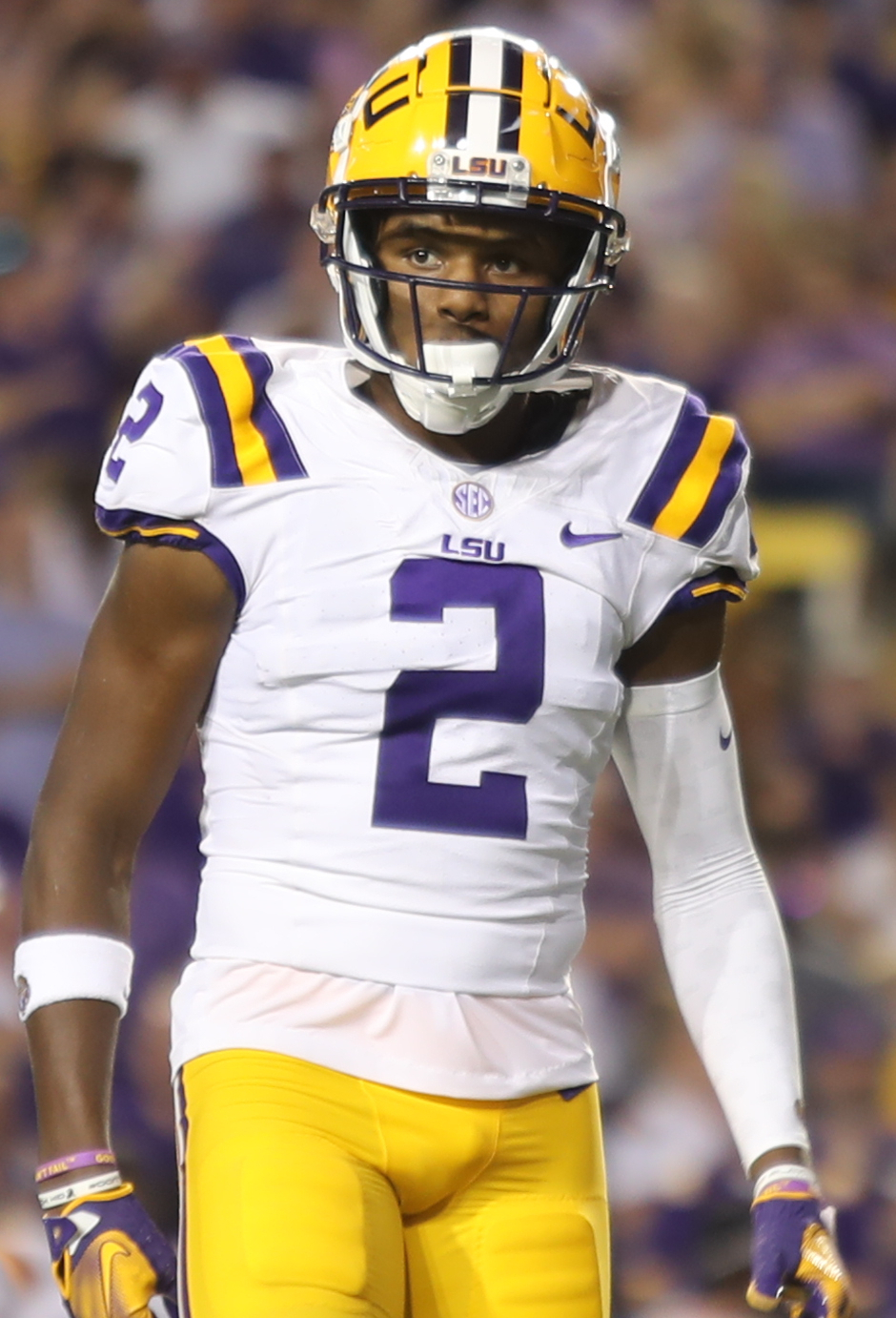
- Lacy with the LSU Tigers in 2023

Personal information
- Born: December 27, 2000; Thibodaux, Louisiana, U.S.
- Died: April 12, 2025 (aged 24); Houston, Texas, U.S.
- Listed height: 6 ft 2 in (1.88 m)
- Listed weight: 213 lb (97 kg)

Career information
- High school: Thibodaux (LA)
- College: Louisiana (2020–2021); LSU (2022–2024)

Awards and highlights
- Second-team All-SEC (2024)
- Stats at ESPN

Kyren Pierre Lacy (December 27, 2000 – April 12, 2025) was an American college football player who was a wide receiver for the Louisiana Ragin' Cajuns and LSU Tigers. During his college football career, Lacy had 163 receptions for 2,360 yards and had 28 touchdowns in 64 games. In the 2024 season, he caught 58 passes for 866 yards, tied for the Southeastern Conference (SEC) lead with ten touchdown catches and was a second-team All-SEC receiver.

== Early life ==
Kyren Pierre Lacy was born on December 27, 2000, in Thibodaux, Louisiana, where he grew up and attended Thibodaux High School. As a senior, he had 54 receptions for 864 yards and 18 touchdowns. Ranked as the 10th wide receiver in Louisiana for the 2020 class, he committed to University of Louisiana at Lafayette to play college football as a three-star recruit, declining offers from Houston, Louisiana–Monroe, Louisiana Tech, Miami, and Virginia.

== College career ==
As a true freshman at the University of Louisiana, Lafayette, in 2020, Lacy played in 11 games and had 28 receptions for 364 yards and four touchdowns. In 2021, he played in 13 games and had 22 receptions for 304 yards and six touchdowns. After two seasons, he transferred to Louisiana State University (LSU). He started 2 of 14 games his first year at LSU in 2022, recording 24 receptions for 268 yards. As the third receiver in the LSU depth chart behind Malik Nabers and Brian Thomas Jr., Lacy started 10 of 13 games and had 30 receptions for 558 yards and seven touchdowns.

He returned to LSU for the 2024 season as the number one receiver. In the 2024 season, he had 58 catches for 866 yards, tied for the SEC lead with nine touchdown receptions and was a second-team All-SEC receiver. On December 19, he announced his plan to declare for the 2025 NFL draft. During his college football tenure, Lacy caught 162 passes for 2,360 yards and had 26 touchdowns in 64 games.

Pre-draft measurables
Height	Weight	Arm length	Hand span	Wingspan	40-yard dash	10-yard split	20-yard split	20-yard shuttle	Vertical jump
6 ft 2 in (1.88 m)	215 lb (98 kg)	33 3/4 in (0.86 m)	10 in (0.25 m)	6 ft 8 1/2 in (2.04 m)	4.60 s	1.62 s	2.64 s	4.43 s	33.5 in (0.85 m)
All values from Pro Day

=== Statistics ===
College statistics
Season	Team	Games		Receiving			
Season	Team	GP	GS	Rec	Yds	Avg	TD
2020	Louisiana	11	1	28	364	13.0	4
2021	Louisiana	14	6	22	304	13.8	6
2022	LSU	14	2	24	268	11.2	1
2023	LSU	13	10	30	558	18.6	7
2024	LSU	12	12	59	866	14.9	9
Career		64	31	163	2,360	14.3	28

== 2024 traffic collision ==
Security camera footage of the collision

On January 10, 2025, Louisiana State Police issued an arrest warrant for Lacy. He was accused of speeding and illegally passing people on Louisiana Highway 20 and causing a head-on car crash that killed a 78-year-old passenger on December 17, 2024. Lacy reportedly fled the scene without calling authorities or emergency services. Lacy was arrested on January 12, after he agreed with authorities to turn himself in. He was released on the same day on a $151,000 bail and charged with negligent homicide, felony hit-and-run with death, and reckless operation of a vehicle by the Lafourche Parish Sheriff's Office.

In October 2025, Lacy's attorney was interviewed on local news, featuring footage he claimed exonerated Lacy, which did in fact show that Lacy’s vehicle was not involved in the crash and that his vehicle came safely to a stop. Following this, more records, including additional video, were released. The district attorney's office maintained the position that Lacy's vehicle caused the chain of events that led to the fatal crash — even though it did not collide with another vehicle — and that they had been prepared to move forward with the case.

== Death ==
On April 12, 2025, two days before a scheduled grand jury hearing related to the December 2024 car crash, Lacy got into a verbal argument with a family member and fired a gun into the ground before fleeing the scene. A vehicle pursuit with the police occurred, lasting several miles, and ended when Lacy's vehicle crashed. Lacy was found dead in his car, appearing to have died by suicide by firearm prior to the crash as both the body camera and dashcam revealed no shots were fired after the pursuit ended.

== See also ==
- List of gridiron football players who died during their careers
