= 2021 Ball State Cardinals football team =

American college football season

2021 Ball State Cardinals football

Camellia Bowl, L 20–51 vs. Georgia State
- Conference: Mid-American Conference
- West Division
- Record: 6–7 (4–4 MAC)
- Head coach: Mike Neu (6th season)
- Offensive coordinator: Kevin Lynch (2nd season)
- Offensive scheme: Multiple
- Defensive coordinator: Tyler Stockton (3rd season)
- Base defense: 3–4
- Home stadium: Scheumann Stadium

2021 Mid-American Conference football standings
	Conf.			Overall
Team	W		L	W		L
East Division
Kent State xy	6	–	2	7	–	7
Miami (OH)	5	–	3	7	–	6
Ohio	3	–	5	3	–	9
Bowling Green	2	–	6	4	–	8
Buffalo	2	–	6	4	–	8
Akron	1	–	7	2	–	10
West Division
Northern Illinois xy$	6	–	2	9	–	5
Central Michigan x	6	–	2	9	–	4
Toledo	5	–	3	7	–	6
Ball State	4	–	4	6	–	7
Eastern Michigan	4	–	4	7	–	6
Western Michigan	4	–	4	8	–	5
Championship: Northern Illinois 41, Kent State 23
$ – Conference champion; x – Division champion/co-champions; y – Championship game participant

The 2021 Ball State Cardinals football team represented Ball State University during the 2021 NCAA Division I FBS football season. The Cardinals were led by sixth-year head coach Mike Neu and played their home games at Scheumann Stadium in Muncie, Indiana. They competed as members of the West Division of the Mid-American Conference.

== Schedule ==
Date	Time	Opponent	Site	TV	Result	Attendance
September 2	7:00 p.m.	Western Illinois*	Scheumann Stadium; Muncie, IN	ESPN+	W 31–21	13,149
September 11	3:30 p.m.	at No. 11 Penn State*	Beaver Stadium; University Park, PA	FS1	L 13–44	105,323
September 18	4:00 p.m.	at Wyoming*	War Memorial Stadium; Laramie, WY	Stadium	L 12–45	23,467
September 25	2:00 p.m.	Toledo	Scheumann Stadium; Muncie, IN	ESPN+	L 12–22	14,902
October 2	5:00 p.m.	Army*	Scheumann Stadium; Muncie, IN	ESPN+	W 28–16	13,713
October 9	3:30 p.m.	at Western Michigan	Waldo Stadium; Kalamazoo, MI	ESPNU	W 45–20	11,403
October 16	2:00 p.m.	at Eastern Michigan	Rynearson Stadium; Ypsilanti, MI	ESPN+	W 38–31	15,258
October 23	3:30 p.m.	Miami (OH)^{†}	Scheumann Stadium; Muncie, IN	ESPN+	L 17–24	15,703
November 2	7:00 p.m.	at Akron	InfoCision Stadium; Akron, OH	CBSSN	W 31–25	7,683
November 10	7:00 p.m.	at Northern Illinois	Huskie Stadium; DeKalb, IL (Bronze Stalk Trophy)	ESPN2	L 29–30	7,894
November 17	7:00 p.m.	Central Michigan	Scheumann Stadium; Muncie, IN	ESPNU	L 17–37	5,602
November 23	7:00 p.m.	Buffalo	Scheumann Stadium; Muncie, IN	ESPN+	W 20–3	6,112
December 25	2:30 p.m.	vs. Georgia State*	Cramton Bowl; Montgomery, AL (Camellia Bowl)	ESPN	L 20–51	7,345
*Non-conference game; ^{†}Homecoming; Rankings from AP Poll released prior to the game; All times are in Eastern time

== Rankings ==
Ranking movements Legend: RV = Received votes
	Week															
Poll	Pre	1	2	3	4	5	6	7	8	9	10	11	12	13	14	Final
AP	RV	RV														
Coaches	RV	RV														
CFP	Not released															Not released

== Game summaries ==
=== Western Illinois ===
Western Illinois at Ball State

Team	1	2	3	4	Total
Western Illinois	0	7	7	7	21
• Ball State	7	0	14	10	31

- Date: September 2, 2021
- Location: Scheumann Stadium
  Muncie, IN
- Game start: 7:00 p.m. EST
- Game attendance: 13,149
- Television network: ESPN+

Statistics	Western Illinois	Ball State
First downs	17	18
Total yards	437	404
Rushing yards	70	216
Passing yards	367	188
Turnovers	1	1
Time of possession	31:02	28:58

Team	Category	Player	Statistics
Western Illinois	Passing	Connor Sampson	30/43, 367 yards, 2 TDs, 1 INT
Western Illinois	Rushing	Myles Wanza	8 carries, 37 yards
Western Illinois	Receiving	Dennis Houston	12 receptions, 237 yards, 2 TDs
Ball State	Passing	Drew Plitt	17/28, 188 yards, 2 TDs
Ball State	Rushing	Will Jones	18 carries, 93 yards, 1 TD
Ball State	Receiving	Justin Hall	8 receptions, 137 yards, 2 TDs

=== At No. 11 Penn State ===
Ball State at No. 11 Penn State

Team	1	2	3	4	Total
Ball State	0	6	0	7	13
• No. 11 Penn State	14	10	10	10	44

- Date: September 11, 2021
- Location: Beaver Stadium
  University Park, PA
- Game start: 3:30 p.m. EST
- Game attendance: 105,323
- Game weather: Partly sunny; 73 °F (23 °C)
- Referee: Ron Hudson
- TV announcers (FS1): Aaron Goldsmith (play-by-play) and Mark Helfrich (analyst)

Scoring summary
1	10:01	PSU	Noah Cain 5-yard run (Jordan Stout kick)	PSU 7–0
1	5:53	PSU	Sean Clifford 1-yard run (Jordan Stout kick)	PSU 14–0
2	14:25	BSU	Jake Chanove 24-yard field goal	PSU 14–3
2	11:22	PSU	Jordan Stout 45-yard field goal	PSU 17–3
2	2:50	PSU	Jahan Dotson 25-yard pass from Sean Clifford (Jordan Stout kick)	PSU 24–3
2	0:00	BSU	Jake Chanove 23-yard field goal	PSU 24–6
3	5:56	PSU	Jesse Luketa 16-yard interception (Jordan Stout kick)	PSU 31–6
3	1:53	PSU	Jordan Stout 26-yard field goal	PSU 34–6
4	9:59	PSU	Jordan Stout 22-yard field goal	PSU 37–6
4	6:58	BSU	Carson Steele 6-yard run (Jake Chanove kick)	PSU 37–13
4	2:10	PSU	Theo Johnson 23-yard pass from Ta'Quan Roberson (Jordan Stout kick)	PSU 44–13

Statistics	Ball State	Penn State
First downs	20	32
Total yards	295	493
Rushing yards	69	240
Passing yards	226	253
Turnovers	2	0
Time of possession	25:51	34:09

Team	Category	Player	Statistics
Ball State	Passing	Drew Plitt	25/39, 176 yards, 2 INTs
Ball State	Rushing	Carson Steele	7 carries, 18 yards, 1 TD
Ball State	Receiving	Jayshon Jackson	4 receptions, 42 yards
Penn State	Passing	Sean Clifford	21/29, 230 yards, 1 TD
Penn State	Rushing	Noah Cain	20 carries, 69 yards, 1 TD
Penn State	Receiving	Jahan Dotson	5 receptions, 65 yards, 1 TD

=== At Wyoming ===
Ball State at Wyoming

Team	1	2	3	4	Total
Ball State	0	0	6	6	12
• Wyoming	10	21	0	14	45

- Date: September 18. 2021
- Location: War Memorial Stadium
  Laramie, WY
- Game start: 4:00 p.m. EST
- Game attendance: 23,467
- Television network: Stadium

Scoring summary
1	7:42	WYO	John Hoyland 24-yard field goal (7 plays, 53 yards, 2:45)	WYO 3–0
1	5:46	WYO	Keyon Blankenbaker 52-yard interception (John Hoyland kick) (5 plays, 23 yards, 1:56)	WYO 10–0
2	14:55	WYO	Treyton Welch 1-yard reception from Sean Chambers (John Hoyland kick) (8 plays, 80 yards, 3:14)	WYO 17–0
2	3:51	WYO	Dawaiian McNeely 16-yard run (John Hoyland kick) (6 plays, 68 yards, 2:48)	WYO 24–0
2	0:17	WYO	Sean Chambers 1-yard run (John Hoyland kick) (5 plays, 31 yards, 0:25)	WYO 31–0
3	1:59	BALL	Will Jones 1-yard run (kick no good) (15 plays, 87 yards, 5:34)	WYO 31–6
4	11:04	WYO	Xazavian Valladay 1-yard run (John Hoyland kick) (11 plays, 75 yards, 5:55)	WYO 38–6
4	8:21	BALL	Carson Steele 19-yard run (2-point pass incomplete) (8 plays, 75 yards, 2:43)	WYO 38–12
4	6:35	WYO	Chad Muma 40-yard interception (John Hoyland kick) (1 play, 0 yards, 0:09)	WYO 45–12

Statistics	Ball State	Wyoming
First downs	19	19
Total yards	260	378
Rushing yards	118	177
Passing yards	142	201
Turnovers	3	0
Time of possession	30:11	29:49

Team	Category	Player	Statistics
Ball State	Passing	John Paddock	13/20, 82 yards, 1 INT
Ball State	Rushing	Carson Steele	13 carries, 76 yards, 1 TD
Ball State	Receiving	Jayshon Jackson	10 receptions, 92 yards
Wyoming	Passing	Sean Chambers	14/23, 201 yards, 1 TD
Wyoming	Rushing	Xazavian Valladay	14 carries, 61 yards, 1 TD
Wyoming	Receiving	Isaiah Neyor	4 receptions, 84 yards

=== Toledo ===
Toledo at Ball State

Team	1	2	3	4	Total
• Toledo	7	7	0	8	22
Ball State	6	3	0	3	12

- Date: September 25, 2021
- Location: Scheumann Stadium
  Muncie, IN
- Game start: 2:00 p.m. EST
- Game attendance: 14,902
- Television network: ESPN+

Statistics	Toledo	Ball State
First downs	19	17
Total yards	444	312
Rushing yards	272	122
Passing yards	172	190
Turnovers	1	1
Time of possession	33:03	26:57

Team	Category	Player	Statistics
Toledo	Passing	Carter Bradley	10/18, 144 yards, 1 TD, 1 INT
Toledo	Rushing	Dequan Finn	12 carries, 106 yards, 1 TD
Toledo	Receiving	Devin Maddox	2 receptions, 75 yards, 1 TD
Ball State	Passing	Drew Plitt	21/35, 190 yards
Ball State	Rushing	Justin Hall	5 carries, 64 yards
Ball State	Receiving	Justin Hall	7 receptions, 97 yards

=== Army ===
Army at Ball State

Team	1	2	3	4	Total
Army	0	14	0	2	16
• Ball State	21	0	0	7	28

- Date: October 2, 2021
- Location: Scheumann Stadium
  Muncie, IN
- Game start: 5:00 p.m. EST
- Game attendance: 13,713
- Game weather: Sunny • Temperature: 68 °F (20 °C) • Wind: S 9 MPH
- Referee: Ron Hudson
- TV announcers (ESPN+): Jim Barbar (play-by-play) & Tyoka Jackson (analyst)

Scoring summary
1	14:48	BALL	Justin Hall 99-yard kickoff return (Jake Chanove kick) (0 plays, 0 yards, 0:00)	BALL 7–0
1	10:26	BALL	Jayshon Jackson 45-yard pass from Drew Plitt (Jake Chanove kick) (1 play, 45 yards, 0:08)	BALL 14–0
1	4:48	BALL	Carson Steele 2-yard rush (Jake Chanove kick) (10 plays, 57 yards, 3:30)	BALL 21–0
2	13:14	ARMY	Tyhier Tyler 4-yard rush (Cole Talley kick) (12 plays, 75 yards, 6:34)	BALL 21–7
2	1:37	ARMY	Tyhier Tyler 2-yard rush (Cole Talley kick) (14 plays, 80 yards, 8:19)	BALL 21–14
4	8:00	BALL	Yo'Heinz Tyler 18-yard pass from Drew Plitt (Jake Chanove kick) (3 plays, 45 yards, 0:49)	BALL 28–14
4	2:09	ARMY	TEAM 6-yard safety (0 plays, 0 yards, 0:00)	BALL 28–16

Statistics	Army	Ball State
First downs	18	12
Total yards	279	269
Rushing yards	213	36
Passing yards	66	233
Turnovers	2	0
Time of possession	33:03	26:57

Team	Category	Player	Statistics
Army	Passing	Jemel Jones	5/11, 66 yards, 1 INT
Army	Rushing	Tyhier Tyler	24 carries, 63 yards, 2 TDs
Army	Receiving	Isaiah Alston	2 receptions, 36 yards
Ball State	Passing	Drew Plitt	17/28, 233 yards, 2 TDs
Ball State	Rushing	Carson Steele	8 carries, 17 yards, 1 TD
Ball State	Receiving	Yo'Heinz Tyler	5 receptions, 85 yards, 1 TD

=== At Western Michigan ===
Ball State at Western Michigan

Team	1	2	3	4	Total
• Ball State	7	10	7	21	45
Western Michigan	14	3	3	0	20

- Date: October 9. 2021
- Location: Waldo Stadium
  Kalamazoo, MI
- Game start: 3:30 p.m. EST
- Game attendance: 11,403
- Television network: ESPNU

Statistics	Ball State	Western Michigan
First downs	18	23
Total yards	361	376
Rushing yards	51	119
Passing yards	310	257
Turnovers	0	4
Time of possession	23:37	36:23

Team	Category	Player	Statistics
Ball State	Passing	Drew Plitt	15/25, 310 yards, 4 TDs
Ball State	Rushing	Carson Steele	10 carries, 41 yards
Ball State	Receiving	Yo'Heinz Tyler	5 receptions, 93 yards, 2 TDs
Western Michigan	Passing	Kaleb Eleby	19/33, 257 yards, 2 INTs
Western Michigan	Rushing	La'Darius Jefferson	21 carries, 65 yards, 1 TD
Western Michigan	Receiving	Skyy Moore	7 receptions, 81 yards

=== At Eastern Michigan ===
Ball State at Eastern Michigan

Team	1	2	3	4	Total
• Ball State	14	3	7	14	38
Eastern Michigan	0	14	3	14	31

- Date: October 16. 2021
- Location: Rynearson Stadium
  Ypsilanti, MI
- Game start: 2:00 p.m. EST
- Game attendance: 15,258
- Television network: ESPN+

Statistics	Ball State	Eastern Michigan
First downs	29	27
Total yards	433	385
Rushing yards	200	46
Passing yards	233	339
Turnovers	0	2
Time of possession	32:43	27:17

Team	Category	Player	Statistics
Ball State	Passing	Drew Plitt	27/35, 207 yards, 1 TD
Ball State	Rushing	Carson Steele	18 carries, 138 yards, 1 TD
Ball State	Receiving	Justin Hall	10 receptions, 58 yards
Eastern Michigan	Passing	Ben Bryant	35/48, 331 yards, 1 TD, 2 INTs
Eastern Michigan	Rushing	Jawon Hamilton	8 carries, 40 yards
Eastern Michigan	Receiving	Dylan Drummond	7 receptions, 105 yards, 1 TD

=== Miami (Ohio) ===
Red Bird Rivalry

Team	1	2	3	4	Total
• Miami (OH)	10	6	0	8	24
Ball State	7	3	7	0	17

- Date: October 23, 2021
- Location: Scheumann Stadium
  Muncie, IN
- Game start: 3:30 p.m. EST
- Game attendance: 15, 703
- Television network: ESPN+

Statistics	Miami	Ball State
First downs	18	20
Total yards	360	327
Rushing yards	126	100
Passing yards	234	227
Turnovers	0	2
Time of possession	34:32	25:28

Team	Category	Player	Statistics
Miami	Passing	Brett Gabbert	20/24, 207 yards, 2 TDs
Miami	Rushing	Tyre Shelton	14 carries, 46 yards
Miami	Receiving	Jack Sorenson	8 receptions, 138 yards
Ball State	Passing	Drew Plitt	22/34, 227 yards, 2 TDs, 1 INT
Ball State	Rushing	Carson Steele	11 carries, 49 yards
Ball State	Receiving	Jayshon Jackson	9 receptions, 121 yards, 1 TD

=== At Akron ===
Ball State at Akron

Team	1	2	3	4	Total
• Ball State	7	14	7	3	31
Akron	3	7	0	15	25

- Date: November 2, 2021
- Location: InfoCision Stadium
  Akron, OH
- Game start: 7:00 p.m. EST
- Game attendance: 7,683
- Television network: CBSSN

Statistics	Ball State	Akron
First downs	25	20
Total yards	425	458
Rushing yards	240	127
Passing yards	185	331
Turnovers	0	1
Time of possession	29:54	30:06

Team	Category	Player	Statistics
Ball State	Passing	Drew Plitt	18/31, 185 yards, 3 TDs
Ball State	Rushing	Carson Steele	27 carries, 154 yards
Ball State	Receiving	Justin Hall	8 receptions, 73 yards, 1 TD
Akron	Passing	Zach Gibson	24/31, 331 yards, 2 TDs
Akron	Rushing	Jonzell Norrils	17 carries, 88 yards, 1 TD
Akron	Receiving	Michael Mathison	8 receptions, 154 yards, 1 TD

=== At Northern Illinois (Bronze Stalk Trophy) ===
Bronze Stalk Trophy

Team	1	2	3	4	Total
Ball State	10	7	9	3	29
• Northern Illinois	0	17	3	10	30

- Date: November 10, 2021
- Location: Huskie Stadium
  DeKalb, IL
- Game start: 7:00 p.m. EST
- Game attendance: 7,894
- Television network: ESPN2

Statistics	Ball State	Northern Illinois
First downs	17	26
Total yards	372	475
Rushing yards	246	211
Passing yards	126	264
Turnovers	0	2
Time of possession	23:16	36:44

Team	Category	Player	Statistics
Ball State	Passing	Drew Plitt	11/26, 126 yards, 1 TD
Ball State	Rushing	Carson Steele	21 carries, 109 yards
Ball State	Receiving	Jalen McGaughy	1 reception, 45 yards
Northern Illinois	Passing	Rocky Lombardi	23/38, 264 yards, 1 TD, 1 INT
Northern Illinois	Rushing	Jay Ducker	24 carries, 155 yards, 1 TD
Northern Illinois	Receiving	Trayvon Rudolph	8 receptions, 108 yards

=== Central Michigan ===
Central Michigan at Ball State

Team	1	2	3	4	Total
• Central Michigan	7	21	6	3	37
Ball State	7	10	0	0	17

- Date: November 17, 2021
- Location: Scheumann Stadium
  Muncie, IN
- Game start: 7:00 p.m. EST
- Game attendance: 5,602
- Television network: ESPNU

Statistics	Central Michigan	Ball State
First downs	26	18
Total yards	567	329
Rushing yards	285	159
Passing yards	282	170
Turnovers	2	1
Time of possession	32:47	27:13

Team	Category	Player	Statistics
Central Michigan	Passing	Daniel Richardson	20/25, 283 yards, 2 TDs, 2 INTs
Central Michigan	Rushing	Lew Nichols III	32 carries, 219 yards, 3 TDs
Central Michigan	Receiving	Kalil Pimpleton	7 receptions, 144 yards, 1 TD
Ball State	Passing	Drew Plitt	21/39, 170 yards, 1 TD, 1 INT
Ball State	Rushing	Carson Steele	20 carries, 93 yards, 1 TD
Ball State	Receiving	Jayshon Jackson	6 receptions, 61 yards

=== Buffalo ===
Buffalo at Ball State

Team	1	2	3	4	Total
Buffalo	0	3	0	0	3
• Ball State	14	3	3	0	20

- Date: November 23, 2021
- Location: Scheumann Stadium
  Muncie, IN
- Game start: 7:00 p.m. EST
- Game attendance: 6,112
- Television network: ESPN+

Statistics	Buffalo	Ball State
First downs	22	13
Total yards	336	230
Rushing yards	148	54
Passing yards	188	176
Turnovers	4	0
Time of possession	29:40	30:20

Team	Category	Player	Statistics
Buffalo	Passing	Matt Myers	18/39, 188 yards, 4 INTs
Buffalo	Rushing	Matt Myers	16 carries, 78 yards
Buffalo	Receiving	Ron Cook Jr.	4 receptions, 56 yards
Ball State	Passing	Drew Plitt	19/31, 176 yards, 1 TD
Ball State	Rushing	Carson Steele	25 carries, 45 yards
Ball State	Receiving	Jayshon Jackson	9 receptions, 103 yards, 1 TD

=== Vs. Georgia State (Camellia Bowl) ===
Camellia Bowl

Team	1	2	3	4	Total
• Georgia State	14	6	28	3	51
Ball State	7	6	0	7	20

- Date: December 25, 2021
- Location: Cramton Bowl
  Montgomery, AL
- Game start: 2:30 p.m. EST
- Game attendance: 7,345
- Game weather: 75 °F (24 °C) • Weather: Partly cloudy • Wind: SW 13 MPH
- Referee: Kevin Vicknair
- TV announcers (ESPN): Roy Philpott (play-by-play), Hutson Mason (analyst), and Abby Labar (sideline)

Scoring summary
1	8:59	BALL	Jayshon Jackson 56-yard reception from Drew Plitt (Jake Chanove kick) (2 plays, 61 yards, 0:38)	BALL 7–0
1	4:55	GSU	Aubry Payne 18-yard reception from Darren Grainger (Noel Ruiz kick) (10 plays, 75 yards, 4:04)	TIED 7–7
1	2:02	GSU	Javon Denis 37-yard fumble recovery (Noel Ruiz kick)	GSU 14–7
2	14:11	GSU	Noel Ruiz 27-yard field goal (7 plays, 24 yards, 1:48)	GSU 17–7
2	9:20	BALL	Jacob Lewis 34-yard field goal (7 plays, 30 yards, 2:06)	GSU 17–10
2	6:01	GSU	Noel Ruiz 28-yard field goal (8 plays, 65 yards, 3:19)	GSU 20–10
2	0:18	BALL	Jacob Lewis 43-yard field goal (13 plays, 53 yards, 5:43)	GSU 20–13
3	12:05	GSU	Robert Lewis 10-yard reception from Darren Grainger (Noel Ruiz kick) (8 plays, 75 yards, 2:55)	GSU 27–13
3	7:08	GSU	Darren Grainger 34-yard run (Noel Ruiz kick) (7 plays, 68 yards, 3:29)	GSU 34–13
3	1:33	GSU	Aubry Payne 16-yard reception from Darren Grainger (Noel Ruiz kick) (5 plays, 71 yards, 1:37)	GSU 41–13
3	0:00	GSU	Antavious Lane 55-yard interception (Noel Ruiz kick)	GSU 48–13
4	9:03	GSU	Noel Ruiz 45-yard field goal (8 plays, 38 yards, 3:27)	GSU 51–13
4	3:13	BALL	Drew Plitt 1-yard run (Jake Chanove kick) (15 plays, 75 yards, 5:50)	GSU 51–20

Statistics	Georgia State	Ball State
First downs	21	22
Total yards	464	367
Rushing yards	259	74
Passing yards	205	293
Turnovers	0	2
Time of possession	26:46	33:14

Team	Category	Player	Statistics
Georgia State	Passing	Darren Grainger	15/19, 203 yards, 3 TDs
Georgia State	Rushing	Darren Grainger	11 carries, 122 yards, 1 TD
Georgia State	Receiving	Aubry Payne	8 receptions, 109 yards, 2 TDs
Ball State	Passing	Drew Plitt	27/46, 293 yards, 1 TD, 1 INT
Ball State	Rushing	Carson Steele	15 carries, 62 yards
Ball State	Receiving	Jayshon Jackson	12 receptions, 146 yards, 1 TD
