= 2021 Coastal Carolina Chanticleers football team =

American college football season

2021 Coastal Carolina Chanticleers football

Cure Bowl champion

Cure Bowl, W 47–41 vs. Northern Illinois
- Conference: Sun Belt Conference
- East Division
- Record: 11–2 (6–2 Sun Belt)
- Head coach: Jamey Chadwell (4th season)
- Co-offensive coordinators: Newland Isaac (3rd season); Willy Korn (3rd season)
- Offensive scheme: Up-tempo spread
- Defensive coordinator: Chad Staggs (3rd season)
- Base defense: 4–2–5
- Home stadium: Brooks Stadium

2021 Sun Belt Conference football standings
	Conf.			Overall
Team	W		L	W		L
East Division
Appalachian State xy	7	–	1	10	–	4
Georgia State	6	–	2	8	–	5
Coastal Carolina	6	–	2	11	–	2
Troy	3	–	5	5	–	7
Georgia Southern	2	–	6	3	–	9
West Division
No. 16 Louisiana xy$	8	–	0	13	–	1
Texas State	3	–	5	4	–	8
Louisiana–Monroe	2	–	6	4	–	8
South Alabama	2	–	6	5	–	7
Arkansas State	1	–	7	2	–	10
Championship: Louisiana 24, Appalachian State 16
$ – Conference champion; x – Division champion/co-champions; y – Championship game participant; Rankings from AP Poll

The 2021 Coastal Carolina Chanticleers football team represented Coastal Carolina University as a member of the East Division of the Sun Belt Conference during the 2021 NCAA Division I FBS football season. Led by fourth-year head coach Jamey Chadwell, the Chanticleers compiled an overall record of 11–2 with a mark of 6–2 in conference play, tying for second place in the Sun Belt's East Division. Coastal Carolina was invited to the Cure Bowl, where the Chanticleers defeated Northern Illinois. Coastal Carolina played home games at Brooks Stadium in Conway, South Carolina.

== Preseason ==
=== Recruiting class ===
College recruiting
Name	Hometown	School	Height	Weight	40^{‡}	Commit date
Charles Arnold Jr. DB	Fairburn, GA	Langston Hughes HS	5 ft 10 in (1.78 m)	165 lb (75 kg)	–	May 15, 2020
Charles Arnold Jr. DB	Recruit ratings: Scout: Rivals: 247Sports: ESPN:					
Max Balthazar; RB	Fort Lauderdale, FL	NSU University School	5 ft 11 in (1.80 m)	190 lb (86 kg)	–	Jul 11, 2020
Max Balthazar; RB	Recruit ratings: Scout: Rivals: 247Sports: ESPN:					
Tom Bambrick; OL	Madison, CT	Daniel Hand HS	6 ft 4 in (1.93 m)	305 lb (138 kg)	–	Dec 16, 2020
Tom Bambrick; OL	Recruit ratings: Scout: Rivals: 247Sports: ESPN:					
Jared Brown; WR	Lilburn, GA	Parkview HS	6 ft 0 in (1.83 m)	175 lb (79 kg)	–	Aug 20, 2020
Jared Brown; WR	Recruit ratings: Scout: Rivals: 247Sports: ESPN:					
Tre' Douglass III; DB	McDonough, GA	Eagles Landing Christian; Vanderbilt	6 ft 2 in (1.88 m)	195 lb (88 kg)	–	Feb 3, 2021
Tre' Douglass III; DB	Recruit ratings: Scout: Rivals: 247Sports: ESPN:					
Tobias Fletcher; DB	Atlanta, GA	Carver HS	5 ft 10 in (1.78 m)	165 lb (75 kg)	–	Jun 28, 2021
Tobias Fletcher; DB	Recruit ratings: Scout: Rivals: 247Sports: ESPN:					
Ze'marion Harrell; LB	Virginia Beach, VA	Salem HS	6 ft 2 in (1.88 m)	220 lb (100 kg)	–	Oct 25, 2020
Ze'marion Harrell; LB	Recruit ratings: Scout: Rivals: 247Sports: ESPN:					
Emmanuel Johnson; DE	North Charleston, SC	Fort Dorchester HS; Georgia Tech	6 ft 6 in (1.98 m)	265 lb (120 kg)	–	Feb 3, 2021
Emmanuel Johnson; DE	Recruit ratings: Scout: Rivals: 247Sports: ESPN:					
AJ Jones III; RB	St. Johns, FL	Bartram Trail HS	5 ft 10 in (1.78 m)	180 lb (82 kg)	–	Dec 16, 2020
AJ Jones III; RB	Recruit ratings: Scout: Rivals: 247Sports: ESPN:					
Zovon Lindsay; OL	Fayetteville, NC	Trinity Christian; NC State	6 ft 4 in (1.93 m)	290 lb (130 kg)	–	Jun 2, 2020
Zovon Lindsay; OL	Recruit ratings: Scout: Rivals: 247Sports: ESPN:					
Ty Lyles; QB	Kernersville, NC	East Forsyth HS	6 ft 2 in (1.88 m)	215 lb (98 kg)	–	Jun 17, 2020
Ty Lyles; QB	Recruit ratings: Scout: Rivals: 247Sports: ESPN:					
Kiylan Miller; ATH	Forest City, NC	Chase HS	6 ft 3 in (1.91 m)	175 lb (79 kg)	–	Aug 12, 2020
Kiylan Miller; ATH	Recruit ratings: Scout: Rivals: 247Sports: ESPN:					
Jared Morrow; OL	Carrollton, GA	Mount Zion HS	6 ft 5 in (1.96 m)	290 lb (130 kg)	–	Jun 12, 2020
Jared Morrow; OL	Recruit ratings: Scout: Rivals: 247Sports: ESPN:					
Dre Pinckney; DB	Boiling Springs, GA	Boiling Springs HS	6 ft 0 in (1.83 m)	200 lb (91 kg)	–	Jul 11, 2020
Dre Pinckney; DB	Recruit ratings: Scout: Rivals: 247Sports: ESPN:					
Chris Rhone; WR	Columbia, SC	Gray Collegiate	6 ft 4 in (1.93 m)	200 lb (91 kg)	–	Nov 1, 2020
Chris Rhone; WR	Recruit ratings: Scout: Rivals: 247Sports: ESPN:					
Josaiah Stewart; DE	Everett, MA	Everett HS	6 ft 2 in (1.88 m)	245 lb (111 kg)	–	Aug 13, 2021
Josaiah Stewart; DE	Recruit ratings: Scout: Rivals: 247Sports: ESPN:					
Malachi Taylor; WR	Goose Creek, SC	Goose Creek HS	6 ft 3 in (1.91 m)	190 lb (86 kg)	–	Jul 17, 2020
Malachi Taylor; WR	Recruit ratings: Scout: Rivals: 247Sports: ESPN:					
Jameson Tucker; WR	Mauldin, SC	Mauldin HS	6 ft 2 in (1.88 m)	190 lb (86 kg)	–	Dec 16, 2020
Jameson Tucker; WR	Recruit ratings: Scout: Rivals: 247Sports: ESPN:					
Anthony Walton; OL	Lamar, SC	Lamar HS	6 ft 4 in (1.93 m)	300 lb (140 kg)	–	Feb 3, 2021
Anthony Walton; OL	Recruit ratings: Scout: Rivals: 247Sports: ESPN:					

=== Award watch lists ===
Listed in the order that they were released

==== Preseason ====
Award	Player	Position	Year
Dodd Trophy	Jamey Chadwell	Head coach	
Maxwell Award	Grayson McCall	QB	RS-SO
Chuck Bednarik Award	Jeffrey Gunter	LB	RS-SR
Davey O'Brien Award	Grayson McCall	QB	RS-SO
Allstate AFCA Good Works Team	C. J. Brewer	DT	SR
Biletnikoff Award	Jaivon Heiligh	WR	SR
Biletnikoff Award	Isaiah Likely	TE	SR
Mackey Award	Isaiah Likely	TE	SR
Jim Thorpe Award	D'Jordan Strong	CB	SR
Outland Trophy	C. J. Brewer	DT	SR
Outland Trophy	Trey Carter	OL	SR
Bronko Nagurski Trophy	C. J. Brewer	DT	SR
Lou Groza Award	Massimo Biscardi	K	SR
Ray Guy Award	Charles Ouverson	P	SR
Wuerffel Trophy	Kennedy Roberts	DT	JR
Walter Camp Award	Grayson McCall	QB	RS-SO
CFPA Performer of the Year	Grayson McCall	QB	RS-SO
Lombardi Award	Isaiah Likely	TE	SR
Manning Award	Grayson McCall	QB	RS-SO

=== Sun Belt coaches poll ===
The Sun Belt coaches poll was released on July 20, 2021. The Chanticleers were picked to finish tied for first in the East Division and second overall in the conference.

=== Sun Belt Preseason All-Conference teams ===
Offense

1st team

- Grayson McCall – Quarterback, RS-SO
- Isaiah Likely – Tight End, SR
- Jaivon Heiligh – Wide Receiver, SR

2nd team

- Trey Carter – Offensive Lineman, SR
- Willie Lampkin – Offensive Lineman, SO

Defense

1st team

- Jeffrey Gunter – Defensive Lineman, RS-SR
- C. J. Brewer – Defensive Lineman, SR
- Silas Kelly – Linebacker, SR
- D'Jordan Strong – Defensive Back, SR

2nd team

- Teddy Gallagher – Linebacker, SR

Special teams

2nd teams

- Massimo biscardi – Kicker, SR

== Schedule ==
The 2021 regular-season schedule consisted of 7 home and 5 away games. The Chanticleers traveled to Sun Belt foes Arkansas State, Appalachian State, Georgia Southern, and South Alabama. Coastal hosted Sun Belt foes Louisiana–Monroe, Troy, Georgia State, and Texas State.

The Chants hosted three of their four non-conference opponents at Brooks Stadium: The Citadel, from the NCAA Division I FCS Southern Conference; Kansas of the Big 12 Conference; and UMass, an FBS Independent. They traveled to Buffalo of the Mid-American Conference.

Date	Time	Opponent	Rank	Site	TV	Result	Attendance
September 2	7:00 p.m.	The Citadel*	No. 22	Brooks Stadium; Conway, SC	ESPN+	W 52–14	16,236
September 10	7:30 p.m.	Kansas*	No. 17	Brooks Stadium; Conway, SC	ESPN2	W 49–22	17,697
September 18	12:00 p.m.	at Buffalo*	No. 16	University at Buffalo Stadium; Amherst, NY	ESPN2	W 28–25	16,739
September 25	1:00 p.m.	UMass*	No. 17	Brooks Stadium; Conway, SC	ESPN+	W 53–3	15,261
October 2	2:30 p.m.	Louisiana–Monroe	No. 16	Brooks Stadium; Conway, SC	ESPN+	W 59–6	18,674
October 7	7:30 p.m.	at Arkansas State	No. 15	Centennial Bank Stadium; Jonesboro, AR	ESPNU	W 52–20	12,086
October 20	7:30 p.m.	at Appalachian State	No. 14	Kidd Brewer Stadium; Boone, NC	ESPN2	L 27–30	31,061
October 28	7:30 p.m.	Troy	No. 24	Brooks Stadium; Conway, SC	ESPN2	W 35–28	11,689
November 6	6:00 p.m.	at Georgia Southern		Paulson Stadium; Statesboro, GA	ESPN+	W 28–8	12,875
November 13	2:00 p.m.	Georgia State^{†}		Brooks Stadium; Conway, SC	ESPN+	L 40–42	16,744
November 20	1:00 p.m.	Texas State		Brooks Stadium; Conway, SC	ESPN+	W 35–21	10,386
November 26	3:30 p.m.	at South Alabama		Hancock Whitney Stadium; Mobile, AL	ESPN+	W 27–21 ^{OT}	13,242
December 17	6:00 p.m.	vs. Northern Illinois*		Exploria Stadium; Orlando, FL (Cure Bowl)	ESPN2	W 47–41	9,784
*Non-conference game; ^{†}Homecoming; Rankings from AP Poll (and CFP Rankings, after November 2) - Released prior to game; All times are in Eastern time

== Rankings ==
Ranking movements Legend: ██ Increase in ranking ██ Decrease in ranking — = Not ranked RV = Received votes т = Tied with team above or below
	Week															
Poll	Pre	1	2	3	4	5	6	7	8	9	10	11	12	13	14	Final
AP	22	17	16	17	16	15	15	14	24	21	21	RV	—	—	—	RV
Coaches	24	19	18	17	16 т	15	15	16	24	21	22	RV	RV	RV	RV	RV
CFP	Not released									—	—	—	—	—	—	Not released

== Game summaries ==
=== The Citadel ===
The Citadel at Coastal Carolina

Team	1	2	3	4	Total
Bulldogs	0	0	7	7	14
• No. 22 Chanticleers	7	24	14	7	52

- Date: September 2, 2021
- Location: Brooks Stadium
  Conway, SC
- Game start: 7:05 p.m. EDT
- Elapsed time: 3 hours and 9 minutes
- Game attendance: 16,236
- Game weather: 81 °F (27 °C) • Weather: Sunny • Wind: NE 2 MPH
- Referee: Marshall Lewis
- TV announcers (ESPN+): Jeff McCarragher (play–by–play) and Nate Ross (analyst)

Scoring summary
1	08:40	CCU	Shermari Jones 2-yard rush (Massimo Biscardi kick) (5 plays, 75 yards, 1:53)	CCU 7–0
2	14:08	CCU	Reese White 4-yard rush (Massimo Biscardi kick) (10 plays, 91 yards, 5:53)	CCU 14–0
2	08:38	CCU	Reese White 16-yard rush (Massimo Biscardi kick) (4 plays, 58 yards, 1:53)	CCU 21–0
2	02:48	CCU	Javion Heiligh 30-yard pass from Grayson McCall (Massimo Biscardi kick) (8 plays, 88 yards, 3:55)	CCU 28–0
2	00:00	CCU	Massimo Biscardi 34-yard field goal (8 plays, 67 yards, 0:53)	CCU 31–0
3	13:17	CCU	Shermari Jones 38-yard rush (Massimo Biscardi kick) (4 plays, 75 yards, 1:37)	CCU 38–0
3	06:08	CIT	Nathan Storch 1-yard rush (Colby Kinter kick) (13 plays, 65 yards, 7:02)	CCU 38–7
3	03:45	CCU	Xavier Gravette 49-yard pass from Bryce Carpenter (Massimo Biscardi kick) (5 plays, 75 yards, 2:23)	CCU 45–7
4	07:10	CIT	Raleigh Webb 8-yard rush (Colby Kinter kick) (13 plays, 61 yards, 7:42)	CCU 45–14
4	02:29	CCU	Braydon Bennett 4-yard rush (Massimo Biscardi kick) (8 plays, 75 yards, 1:41)	CCU 52–14

Statistics	The Citadel	Coastal Carolina
First downs	16	28
Total yards	237	610
Rushing yards	223	262
Passing yards	14	348
Turnovers	0	0
Time of possession	34:39	25:21

Team	Category	Player	Statistics
The Citadel	Passing	Darique Hampton	2/3, 16 yards
The Citadel	Rushing	Jaylan Adams	16 carries, 100 yards
The Citadel	Receiving	Raleigh Webb	2 receptions, 16 yards
Coastal Carolina	Passing	Grayson McCall	16/19, 262 yards, 1 TD
Coastal Carolina	Rushing	Shermari Jones	9 carries, 100 yards
Coastal Carolina	Receiving	Jaivon Heiligh	6 receptions, 133 yards, 1 TD

=== Kansas ===
Kansas at Coastal Carolina

Team	1	2	3	4	Total
Jayhawks	9	6	7	0	22
• No. 17 Chanticleers	7	21	7	14	49

- Date: September 10, 2021
- Location: Brooks Stadium
  Conway, SC
- Game start: 7:35 p.m. EDT
- Elapsed time: 3 hours and 54 minutes
- Game attendance: 17,697
- Game weather: 77 °F (25 °C) • Weather: Sunny • Wind: S 2 MPH
- Referee: Kevin Hassell
- TV announcers (ESPN2): Jason Benetti (play–by–play), Andre Ware (analyst), and Paul Carcaterra (sideline reporter)

Scoring summary
1	10:07	KU	Jacob Borcila 46 yard field goal (8 plays, 36 yards, 4:45)	KU 3–0
1	08:13	KU	Jaivon Heiligh 33 yard pass from Grayson McCall, Massimo Biscardi kick good (6 plays, 75 yards, 1:54)	CCU 7–3
1	01:40	CCU	Devin Neal 2 yard run, Jacob Borcila kick blocked (11 plays, 66 yards, 6:25)	KU 9–7
2	11:02	CCU	Grayson McCall 2 yard run, Massimo Biscardi kick good 12 plays 75 yards, 05:38	CCU 14–9
2	08:23	CCU	Alex Spillum 0 yard return of blocked punt, Massimo Biscardi kick good	CCU 21–9
2	02:36	CCU	Reese White 2 yard run, Massimo Biscardi kick good 4 plays 35 yards, 01:48	CCU 28–9
2	01:36	KU	Jason Bean 34 yard run, Luke Grimm pass from Jason Bean failed 3 plays 65 yards, 01:00	CCU 28–15
3	11:36	KU	Jason Bean 46 yard run, Jacob Borcila kick good 3 plays 65 yards, 01:16	CCU 28–22
3	08:37	CCU	Reese White 19 yard run, Massimo Biscardi kick good 7 plays 75 yards, 02:59	CCU 35–22
4	14:11	CCU	Reese White 3 yard run, Massimo Biscardi kick good 12 plays 72 yards, 05:13	CCU 42–22
4	04:49	CCU	Kameron Brown 11 yard pass from Grayson McCall, Massimo Biscardi kick good 10 plays 83 yards, 06:32	CCU 49–22

Statistics	Kansas	Coastal Carolina
First downs	16	27
Total yards	412	460
Rushing yards	174	215
Passing yards	238	245
Turnovers	0	1
Time of possession	30:49	29:11

Team	Category	Player	Statistics
Kansas	Passing	Jason Bean	12/24, 189 yards
Kansas	Rushing	Jason Bean	13 carries, 102 yards, 2 TDs
Kansas	Receiving	Kwamie Lassiter II	7 receptions, 85 yards
Coastal Carolina	Passing	Grayson McCall	17/21, 245 yards, 2 TDs
Coastal Carolina	Rushing	Reese White	14 carries, 102 yards, 3 TDs
Coastal Carolina	Receiving	Javion Heiligh	6 receptions, 122 yards, 1 TD

=== At Buffalo ===
Coastal Carolina at Buffalo

Team	1	2	3	4	Total
• No. 16 Chanticleers	7	7	7	7	28
Bulls	14	0	3	8	25

- Date: September 18, 2021
- Location: University at Buffalo Stadium
  Amherst, NY
- Game start: 12:02 p.m. EDT
- Elapsed time: 3 hours and 23 minutes
- Game attendance: 16,739
- Game weather: 68 °F (20 °C) • Weather: Cloudy • Wind: NW 8 MPH
- Referee: Matt Packowski
- TV announcers (ESPN2): John Schriffen (play–by–play), Rene Ingoglia (analyst)

Scoring summary
1	10:26	CCU	Aaron Bedgood 16-yard pass from Grayson McCall (Liam Gray kick) (7 plays, 55 yards, 2:51)	CCU 7–0
1	05:31	UB	Dylan McDuffie 2-yard rush (Alex McNulty kick) (12 plays, 86 yards, 4:55)	TIE 7–7
1	00:38	UB	Matt Myers 13-yard rush (Alex McNulty kick) (4 plays, 84 yards, 1:42)	UB 14–7
2	13:45	CCU	Jaivon Heiligh 17-yard pass from Grayson McCall (Liam Gray kick) (5 plays, 56 yards, 1:53)	TIE 14–14
3	12:20	CCU	Isaiah Likely 6-yard pass from Grayson McCall (Liam Gray kick) (5 plays, 75 yards, 2:40)	CCU 21–14
3	06:08	UB	Alex McNulty 36-yard field goal (12 plays, 47 yards, 6:12)	CCU 21–17
4	14:57	CCU	Shermari Jones 1-yard rush (Liam Gray kick) (7 plays, 25 yards, 3:15)	CCU 28–17
4	02:41	UB	Kevin Marks Jr. 7-yard rush (Quian Williams two-point conversion pass from Kyle Vantrease) (16 plays, 92 yards, 7:12)	CCU 28–25

Statistics	Coastal Carolina	Buffalo
First downs	21	20
Total yards	444	408
Rushing yards	212	262
Passing yards	232	146
Turnovers	1	0
Time of possession	28:26	31:34

Team	Category	Player	Statistics
Coastal Carolina	Passing	Grayson McCall	13/19, 232 yards, 3 TDs, 1 INT
Coastal Carolina	Rushing	Shermari Jones	16 carries, 149 yards, 1 TD
Coastal Carolina	Receiving	Jaivon Heiligh	4 receptions, 91 yards, 1 TD
Buffalo	Passing	Kyle Vantrease	13/20, 146 yards
Buffalo	Rushing	Dylan McDuffie	15 carries, 92 yards, 1 TD
Buffalo	Receiving	Dominic Johnson	6 receptions, 66 yards

=== UMass ===
Massachusetts at Coastal Carolina

Team	1	2	3	4	Total
Minutemen	0	0	0	3	3
• No. 17 Chanticleers	13	23	14	3	53

- Date: September 25, 2021
- Location: Brooks Stadium
  Conway, SC
- Game start: 1:05 p.m. EDT
- Elapsed time: 3 hours and 8 minutes
- Game attendance: 15,261
- Game weather: 77 °F (25 °C) • Weather: Sunny • Wind: NW 3 MPH
- Referee: Wayne Winkler
- TV announcers (ESPN+): Jeff McCarragher (play–by–play) and Nate Ross (analyst)

Scoring summary
1	11:00	CCU	Grayson McCall 3-yard rush (Liam Gray PAT failed) (2 plays, 4 yards, 0:41)	CCU 6–0
1	02:58	CCU	Reese White 12-yard rush (Kieran Colahan kick) (9 plays, 99 yards, 4:27)	CCU 14–0
2	11:30	CCU	Isaiah Likely 25-yard pass from Grayson McCall (Kieran Colahan kick) (8 plays, 78 yards, 3:38)	CCU 20–0
2	09:32	CCU	Team Safety (4 plays, -25 yards, 1:58)	CCU 22–0
2	08:01	CCU	Tyson Mobley 32-yard rush (Liam Gray kick) (4 plays, 59 yards, 1:31)	CCU 29–0
2	02:20	CCU	Jaivon Heiligh 23-yard pass from Grayson McCall (Liam Gray kick) (7 plays, 69 yards, 3:25)	CCU 36–0
3	12:38	CCU	Braydon Bennett 1-yard rush (Liam Gray kick) (6 plays, 79 yards, 2:22)	CCU 43–0
3	07:10	CCU	Tyson Mobley 9-yard pass from Bryce Carpenter (Kieran Colahan kick) (6 plays, 81 yards, 3:45)	CCU 50–0
4	14:39	CCU	Kieran Colahan 38-yard field goal (14 plays, 54 yards, 5:43)	CCU 53–0
4	08:22	MASS	Cameron Carson 35-yard field goal (13 plays, 57 yards, 6:17)	CCU 53–3

Statistics	UMass	Coastal Carolina
First downs	13	30
Total yards	158	558
Rushing yards	28	312
Passing yards	130	246
Turnovers	0	0
Time of possession	26:06	33:54

Team	Category	Player	Statistics
UMass	Passing	Brady Olson	14/23, 86 yards
UMass	Rushing	Ellis Merriweather	6 carries, 30 yards
UMass	Receiving	Rico Arnold	4 receptions, 38 yards
Coastal Carolina	Passing	Grayson McCall	10/14, 162 yards, 2 TDs
Coastal Carolina	Rushing	Braydon Bennett	8 carries, 83 yards, 1 TD
Coastal Carolina	Receiving	Jaivon Heiligh	5 receptions, 118 yards, 1 TD

=== Louisiana–Monroe ===
Louisiana–Monroe at Coastal Carolina

Team	1	2	3	4	Total
Warhawks	3	0	3	0	6
• No. 16 Chanticleers	14	24	0	21	59

- Date: October 2, 2021
- Location: Brooks Stadium
  Conway, SC
- Game start: 2:35 p.m. EDT
- Elapsed time: 2 hours and 57 minutes
- Game attendance: 18,674
- Game weather: 82 °F (28 °C) • Weather: Sunny • Wind: SE 6 MPH
- Referee:
- TV announcers (ESPN+): Jeff McCarragher (play–by–play) and Nate Ross (analyst)

Scoring summary
1	09:06	CCU	Isaiah Likely 5-yard pass from Grayson McCall(Liam Gray Kick) (6 plays, 55 yards, 3:28)	CCU 7–0
1	04:46	CCU	Braydon Bennett 10-yard rush (Liam Gray kick) (6 plays, 63 yards, 3:09)	CCU 14–0
1	00:55	ULM	Calum Sutherland 40-yard field goal (4 plays, yards, 1:12)	CCU 14–3
2	12:50	CCU	Isaiah Likely 30-yard pass from Grayson McCall (Kieran Colahan kick) (7 plays, 81 yards, 2:57)	CCU 21–3
2	11:19	CCU	Aaron Bedgoood 9 yard return of blocked punt, Liam Gray kick good	CCU 28–3
2	3:32	CCU	Braydon Bennett 29-yard rush (Liam Gray kick) (7 plays, 86 yards, 4:29)	CCU 35–3
2	00:00	CCU	Liam Gray 46-yard field goal (7 plays, 52 yards, 1:23)	CCU 38–3
3	7:31	ULM	Calum Sutherland 30-yard field goal (12 plays, 59 yards, 5:24)	CCU 38–6
4	14:39	CCU	CJ Beasley 15-yard rush (Kieran Colahan kick) (15 plays, 75 yards, 8:03)	CCU 45–6
4	12:56	CCU	Chris Rhone 32-yard pass from Jarrett Guest (Kieran Colahan kick) (2 plays, 40 yards, :39)	CCU 52–6
4	03:34	CCU	Jared Brown 5-yard pass from Zachary Stevens (Kieran Colahan kick) (9 plays, 75 yards, 6:19)	CCU 59–6

Statistics	Louisiana–Monroe	Coastal Carolina
First downs	10	26
Total yards	203	557
Rushing yards	72	275
Passing yards	131	282
Turnovers	1	1
Time of possession	24:14	35:46

Team	Category	Player	Statistics
Louisiana–Monroe	Passing	Chandler Rogers	9/17, 100 yards
Louisiana–Monroe	Rushing	Chandler Rogers	11 carries, 40 yards
Louisiana–Monroe	Receiving	Zach Jackson	3 receptions, 48 yards
Coastal Carolina	Passing	Grayson McCall	13/13, 212 yards
Coastal Carolina	Rushing	Reese White	15 carries, 95 yards
Coastal Carolina	Receiving	Isaiah Likely	5 receptions, 95 yards

=== At Arkansas State ===
Coastal Carolina at Arkansas State

Team	1	2	3	4	Total
• No. 15 Chanticleers	10	14	14	14	52
Red Wolves	0	0	14	6	20

- Date: October 7, 2021
- Location: Centennial Bank Stadium
  Jonesboro, AR
- Game start: 7:33 p.m. EDT
- Elapsed time: 3 hours and 31 minutes
- Game attendance: 12,086
- Game weather: 73 °F (23 °C) • Weather: Sunny • Wind: SW 8 MPH
- Referee:
- TV announcers (ESPNU): Mike Couzens (play–by–play) and Dustin Fox (analyst)

Scoring summary
1	11:37	CCU	Isaiah Likely 99-yard pass from Grayson McCall (Massimo Biscardi kick) (2 plays, 99 yards, 00:39)	CCU 7–0
1	01:45	CCU	Massimo Biscardi 19-yard field goal (12 plays, 67 yards, 6:44)	CCU 10–0
2	5:56	CCU	Shermari Jones 8-yard rush( Massimo Biscardi kick) (8 plays, 70 yards, 4:08)	CCU 17–0
2	00:13	CCU	Isaiah Likely 4-yard pass from Grayson McCall ( Massimo Biscardi kick) (7 plays, 51 yards, 4:10)	CCU 24–0
3	13:17	CCU	Isaiah Likely 16-yard pass from Grayson McCall (Massimo Biscardi kick) (4 plays, 75 yards, 1:43)	CCU 31–0
3	9:06	ARST	Corey Rucker 15-yard pass from Layne Hatcher ( Blake Grupe kick) (10 plays, 75 yards, 4:04)	CCU 31–7
3	7:29	CCU	Isaiah Likely 64-yard pass from Grayson McCall (Massimo Biscardi kick) (3 plays, 82 yards, 1:32)	CCU 38–7
3	9:06	ARST	Te'vailance Hunt 63-yard pass from Layne Hatcher ( Blake Grupe kick) (3 plays, 63 yards, 00:26)	CCU 38–14
4	12:21	ARST	Lincoln Pare 1-yard rush (8 plays, 75 yards, 2:23)	CCU 38–20
4	11:28	CCU	Reese White 64-yard rush(Massimo Biscardi kick) (2 plays, 83 yards, 00:46)	CCU 45-20
4	7:49	CCU	Bryce Carpenter 67-yard rush(Massimo Biscardi kick) (3 plays, 76 yards, 2:03)	CCU 52-20

Statistics	Coastal Carolina	Arkansas State
First downs	23	16
Total yards	685	273
Rushing yards	294	18
Passing yards	391	255
Turnovers	0	1
Time of possession	36:27	23:33

Team	Category	Player	Statistics
Coastal Carolina	Passing	Grayson McCall	18/23 365 yards, 4 TDs
Coastal Carolina	Rushing	Shermari Jones	10 carries 113 yards, 1 TD
Coastal Carolina	Receiving	Isaiah Likely	8 receptions 232 yards, 4 TDs
Arkansas State	Passing	Layne Hatcher	13/29 185 yards, 2 TDs
Arkansas State	Rushing	Lincoln Pare	6 carries 29 yards, 1 TD
Arkansas State	Receiving	Te'Vailance Hunt	6 receptions 138 yards, 1 TD

=== At Appalachian State ===
Coastal Carolina at Appalachian State

Team	1	2	3	4	Total
No. 14 Chanticleers	14	6	7	0	27
• RV Mountaineers	0	14	13	3	30

- Date: October 20, 2021
- Location: Kidd Brewer Stadium
  Boone, NC
- Game start: 7:35 p.m. EDT
- Elapsed time: 3 hours and 24 minutes
- Game attendance: 31,061
- Game weather: 55 °F (13 °C) • Weather: Sunny • Wind: SW 4 MPH
- Referee: Wayne Winkler
- TV announcers (ESPN2): Anish Shroff (play–by–play), Tom Luginbill (analyst), and Tiffany Blackmon (sideline reporter)

Scoring summary
1	6:46	CCU	Shermari Jones 1-yard run (Massimo Biscardi kick); 10 plays, 72 yards, 4:49)	CCU 7–0
1	1:11	CCU	Kameron Brown 1-yard pass from Grayson McCall (Massimo Biscardi kick) (3 plays, 81 yards, 1:38)	CCU 14–0
2	14:02	APP	Camerun Peoples 1-yard run (Chandler Staton kick) (6 plays, 79 yards, 2:09)	CCU 14–7
2	13:20	APP	Malik Williams 47-yard pass from Chase Brice (Chandler Staton kick) (3 plays, 48 yards, 0:42)	TIE 14–14
2	2:23	CCU	Massimo Biscardi 50-yard field goal (6 plays, 19 yards, 2:59)	CCU 17–14
2	0:00	CCU	Massimo Biscardi 46-yard field goal (2 plays, 0 yards, 0:11)	CCU 20–14
3	9:39	APP	Corey Sutton 28-yard pass from Chase Brice (Chandler Staton kick) (5 plays, 75 yards, 2:14)	APP 21–20
3	4:36	CCU	Shermari Jones 1-yard run (Massimo Biscardi kick) (9 plays, 83 yards, 5:03)	CCU 27–21
3	1:43	APP	Camerun Peoples 43-yard run (two-point conversion failed) (6 plays, 77 yards, 2:53)	TIE 27–27
4	0:00	APP	Chandler Staton 24-yard field goal (9 plays, 55 yards, 3:53)	APP 30–27

Statistics	Coastal Carolina	Appalachian State
First downs	17	22
Total yards	346	575
Rushing yards	55	228
Passing yards	291	347
Turnovers	0	2
Time of possession	29:32	30:28

Team	Category	Player	Statistics
Coastal Carolina	Passing	Grayson McCall	15/23, 291 yards, TD
Coastal Carolina	Rushing	Reese White	9 rushes, 33 yards
Coastal Carolina	Receiving	Jaivon Heiligh	6 receptions, 103 yards
Appalachian State	Passing	Chase Brice	18/28, 347 yards, 2 TD
Appalachian State	Rushing	Nate Noel	16 rushes, 82 yards
Appalachian State	Receiving	Malik Williams	10 receptions, 206 yards, TD

=== Troy ===
Troy at Coastal Carolina

Team	1	2	3	4	Total
Trojans	7	7	7	7	28
• No. 24 Chanticleers	7	14	7	7	35

- Date: October 28, 2021
- Location: Brooks Stadium
  Conway, SC
- Game start: 7:35 p.m. EDT
- Elapsed time: 3 hours and 35 minutes
- Game attendance: 11,689
- Game weather: Sunny
- Referee: Wayne Winkler
- TV announcers (ESPN2): Clay Matvick (play–by–play), Rocky Boiman (analyst), and Tiffany Blackmon (sideline reporter)

Scoring summary
1	13:48	CCU	CJ Marable 59-yard rush (Massimo Biscardi kick) (3 plays, 75 yards, 1:12)	CCU 7–0
1	08:22	CCU	CJ Marable 20-yard pass from Grayson McCall (Massimo Biscardi kick) (9 plays, 90 yards, 4:18)	CCU 14–0
1	04:02	TROY	Evan Legassey 42-yard field goal (14 plays, 45 yards, 4:20)	CCU 14–3
2	12:26	TROY	Kimani Vidal 4-yard rush (Evan Legassey kick) (13 plays, 87 yards, 3:51)	CCU 14–10
2	05:27	TROY	Evan Legassey 28-yard field goal (14 plays, 79 yards, 5:28)	CCU 14–13
2	01:38	CCU	CJ Marable 2-yard rush (Massimo Biscardi kick) (8 plays, 75 yards, 3:49)	CCU 21–13
2	00:00	TROY	Evan Legassey 23-yard field goal (8 plays, 66 yards, 1:38)	CCU 21–16
3	04:33	CCU	Jaivon Heiligh 6-yard pass from Grayson McCall (Massimo Biscardi kick) (16 plays, 83 yards, 9:48)	CCU 28–16
3	03:18	TROY	Reggie Todd 41-yard pass from Gunnar Watson (Evan Legassey kick) (4 plays, 69 yards, 1:15)	CCU 28–23
4	05:03	CCU	Grayson McCall 2-yard rush (Massimo Biscardi kick) (4 plays, 4 yards, 2:18)	CCU 35–23
4	02:48	TROY	Jamontez Woods 3-yard rush (Evan Legassey kick) (11 plays, 75 yards, 2:15)	CCU 35–30
4	01:20	TROY	Tray Eafford 6-yard pass from Jacob Free (Jacob Free two-point conversion pass to Khalil McClain) (7 plays, 40 yards, 1:11)	TROY 38–35
4	00:35	CCU	Jaivon Heiligh 23-yard pass from Grayson McCall (Massimo Biscardi kick) (5 plays, 75 yards, 0:45)	CCU 42–38

Statistics	Troy	Coastal Carolina
First downs	29	29
Total yards	514	443
Rushing yards	176	89
Passing yards	338	354
Turnovers	1	3
Time of possession	36:28	23:32

Team	Category	Player	Statistics
Coastal Carolina	Passing	Grayson McCall	24/29, 338 yards, 3 TDs, 1 INT
Coastal Carolina	Rushing	CJ Marable	20 carries, 120 yards, 2 TDs
Coastal Carolina	Receiving	Jaivon Heiligh	11 receptions, 138 yards, 2 TDs
Troy	Passing	Gunnar Watson	25/37, 260 yards, 1 TD, 1 INT
Troy	Rushing	Jamontez Woods	9 carries, 49 yards, 1 TD
Troy	Receiving	Kaylon Geiger	9 receptions, 103 yards

=== At Georgia Southern ===
Coastal Carolina at Georgia Southern

Team	1	2	3	4	Total
• Chanticleers	0	21	7	0	28
Eagles	0	0	0	8	8

- Date: November 6, 2021
- Location: Paulson Stadium
  Statesboro, GA
- Game start: 6:05 p.m. EDT
- Elapsed time: 3 hours
- Game attendance: 12,875
- Game weather: Sunny
- Referee: Kyle Olson
- TV announcers (ESPN+): Matt Stewart (play–by–play) and Danny Waugh (analyst)

Scoring summary
2	08:54	CCU	Kameron Brown 12 yard pass from Bryce Carpenter (Massimo Biscardi kick) (3 plays, 36 yards, 1:28)	CCU 7–0
2	03:23	CCU	Bryce Carpenter 23-yard rush (Massimo Biscardi kick) (3 plays, 40 yards, 1:12)	CCU 14–0
2	00:00	CCU	Mason Shelton 33-yard blocked punt returned (Massimo Biscardi kick) (8 plays, 19 yards, 3:16)	CCU 21–0
3	05:17	CCU	Shermari Jones 7-yard rush (Massimo Biscardi kick) (12 plays, 92 yards, 6:49)	CCU 28–0
4	10:56	GASO	Beau Johnson 6-yard pass from Cam Ransom (Cam Ransom two-point pass conversion to Derwin Burgess) (5 plays, 45 yards, 2:22)	CCU 28–8

Statistics	Coastal Carolina	Georgia Southern
First downs	17	15
Total yards	305	233
Rushing yards	220	86
Passing yards	85	147
Turnovers	1	4
Time of possession	31:37	28:23

Team	Category	Player	Statistics
Coastal Carolina	Passing	Bryce Carpenter	13/20, 85 yards, 1 TD
Coastal Carolina	Rushing	Shermari Jones	20 carries, 96 yards, 1 TD
Coastal Carolina	Receiving	Kameron Brown	3 receptions, 30 yards, 1 TD
Georgia Southern	Passing	Justin Tomlin	6/13, 83 yards, 1 INT
Georgia Southern	Rushing	Justin Tomlin	10 carries, 39 yards
Georgia Southern	Receiving	Khaleb Hood	5 receptions, 66 yards

=== Georgia State ===
Georgia State at Coastal Carolina

Team	1	2	3	4	Total
• Panthers	14	14	0	14	42
Chanticleers	14	9	3	14	40

- Date: November 13, 2021
- Location: Brooks Stadium
  Conway, SC
- Game start: 2:05 p.m. EST
- Elapsed time: 3 hours and 26 minutes
- Game attendance: 16,744
- Game weather: 70 °F (21 °C) • Weather: Sunny • Wind: SW 8 MPH
- Referee: Matt Loeffler
- TV announcers (ESPN+): Jeff McCarragher (play–by–play) and Nate Ross (analyst)

Scoring summary
1	12:55	CCU	Shermari Jones 1-yard rush (Massimo Biscardi kick) (6 plays, 77 yards, 2:29)	CCU 7–0
1	03:40	GSU	Tucker Gregg 2-yard rush (Noel Ruiz kick) (11 plays, 75 yards, 4:12)	TIE 7–7
1	03:25	CCU	Braydon Bennett 75-yard rush (Massimo Biscardi kick) (1 play, 75 yards, 0:15)	CCU 14–7
1	01:19	GSU	Aubry Payne 3-yard pass from Darren Grainger (Noel Ruiz kick) (8 plays, 75 yards, 2:06)	TIE 14–14
2	14:57	GSU	Tucker Gregg 1-yard rush (Noel Ruiz kick) (2 plays, 1 yard, 0:37)	GSU 21–14
2	09:38	CCU	Team Safety (2 plays, -2 yards, 0:35)	GSU 21–16
2	05:02	GSU	Jamyest Williams 36-yard rush (Noel Ruiz kick) (8 plays, 75 yards, 3:03)	GSU 28–16
2	00:45	CCU	Shermari Jones 8-yard rush (Massimo Biscardi kick) (10 plays, 75 yards, 4:17)	GSU 28–23
3	04:42	CCU	Massimo Biscardi 24-yard field goal (15 plays, 44 yards, 8:52)	GSU 28–26
4	09:15	CCU	Shermari Jones 8-yard rush (Greg Latushko two-point conversion pass to Bryce Carpenter) (9 plays, 64 yards, 4:26)	CCU 34–28
4	04:53	GSU	Terrance Dixon 2-yard pass from Darren Grainger (Noel Ruiz kick) (11 plays, 75 yards, 4:22)	GSU 35–34
4	02:36	GSU	Tucker Gregg 4-yard rush (Noel Ruiz kick) (2 plays, 8 yards, 0:11)	GSU 42–34
4	01:09	CCU	Isaiah Likely 17-yard pass from Bryce Carpenter (two-point conversion rush failed) (8 plays, 75 yards, 1:27)	GSU 42–40

Statistics	Georgia State	Coastal Carolina
First downs	18	26
Total yards	373	442
Rushing yards	175	209
Passing yards	198	233
Turnovers	0	2
Time of possession	25:11	34:49

Team	Category	Player	Statistics
Georgia State	Passing	Darren Grainger	18/24, 198 yards, 2 TDs
Georgia State	Rushing	Jamyest Williams	11 carries, 82 yards, 1 TD
Georgia State	Receiving	Roger Carter	3 receptions, 70 yards
Coastal Carolina	Passing	Bryce Carpenter	17/29, 233 yards, 1 TD, 1 INT
Coastal Carolina	Rushing	Braydon Bennett	10 carries, 128 yards, 1 TD
Coastal Carolina	Receiving	Isaiah Likely	7 receptions, 101 yards, 1 TD

=== Texas State ===
Texas State at Coastal Carolina

Team	1	2	3	4	Total
Bobcats	0	14	7	0	21
• Chanticleers	7	7	14	7	35

- Date: November 20, 2021
- Location: Brooks Stadium
  Conway, SC
- Game start: 1:05 p.m. EST
- Elapsed time: 3 hours and 11 minutes
- Game attendance: 10,386
- Game weather: 60 °F (16 °C) • Weather: Sunny
- Referee: Trennis Livingston
- TV announcers (ESPN+): Jeff McCarragher (play–by–play) and Nate Ross (analyst)

Scoring summary
1	03:57	CCU	Kameron Brown 19-yard pass from Grayson McCall (Massimo Biscardi kick) (12 plays, 83 yards, 6:19)	CCU 7–0
2	06:27	CCU	Jaivon Heiligh 5-yard pass from Grayson McCall (Massimo Biscardi kick) (5 plays, 28 yards, 1:38)	CCU 14–0
2	01:46	TXST	Jahmyl Jeter 1-yard rush (Seth Keller kick) (10 plays, 75 yards, 4:41)	CCU 14–7
2	00:00	TXST	Calvin Hill 54-yard rush (Seth Keller kick) (4 plays, 69 yards, 0:23)	TIE 14–14
3	12:21	CCU	Kameron Brown 52-yard pass from Grayson McCall (Massimo Biscardi kick) (4 plays, 62 yards, 1:32)	CCU 21–14
3	09:48	TXST	Marcell Barbee 38-yard pass from Tyler Vitt (Seth Keller kick) (4 plays, 64 yards, 2:23)	TIE 21–21
3	04:45	CCU	Isaiah Likely 21-yard pass from Grayson McCall (Massimo Biscardi kick) (10 plays, 75 yards, 5:03)	CCU 28–21
4	08:23	CCU	Tyson Mobley 39-yard pass from Grayson McCall (Massimo Biscardi kick) (4 plays, 68 yards, 1:59)	CCU 35–21

Statistics	Texas State	Coastal Carolina
First downs	17	30
Total yards	301	498
Rushing yards	188	179
Passing yards	113	319
Turnovers	0	0
Time of possession	24:54	35:06

Team	Category	Player	Statistics
Texas State	Passing	Tyler Vitt	14/27, 113 yards, 1 TD
Texas State	Rushing	Calvin Hill	12 carries, 100 yards, 1 TD
Texas State	Receiving	Ashtyn Hawkins	3 receptions, 48 yards
Coastal Carolina	Passing	Grayson McCall	22/28, 319 yards, 5 TDs
Coastal Carolina	Rushing	Shermari Jones	23 carries, 92 yards
Coastal Carolina	Receiving	Jaivon Heiligh	10 receptions, 101 yards, 1 TD

=== At South Alabama ===
Coastal Carolina at South Alabama

Team	1	2	3	4	OT	Total
• Chanticleers	0	0	7	14	6	27
Jaguars	7	3	0	11	0	21

- Date: November 26, 2021
- Location: Hancock Whitney Stadium
  Mobile, AL
- Game start: 3:30 p.m. EST
- Elapsed time: 3 hours and 21 minutes
- Game attendance: 13,242
- Game weather: 58 °F (14 °C) • Weather: Sunny • Wind: N 15 MPH
- Referee: Marshall Lewis
- TV announcers (ESPN+): J. D. Byars (play–by–play) and Pat Greenwood (analyst)

Scoring summary
1	06:42	USA	Lincoln Sefcik 8-yard pass from Jake Bentley (Diego Guajardo kick) (12 plays, 88 yards, 5:05)	USA 7–0
2	12:14	USA	Diego Guajardo 30-yard field goal (10 plays, 58 yards, 4:20)	USA 10–0
3	02:24	CCU	Jaivon Heiligh 10-yard pass from Grayson McCall (Massimo Biscardi kick) (19 plays, 95 yards, 9:27)	USA 10–7
4	14:49	CCU	Shermari Jones 75-yard rush (Massimo Biscardi kick) (2 plays, 82 yards, 0:17)	CCU 14–10
4	11:14	USA	Diego Guajardo 33-yard field goal (7 plays, 50 yards, 3:35)	CCU 14–13
4	04:24	USA	Jalen Tolbert 57-yard pass from Jake Bentley (Jake Bentley two-point conversion pass to Caullin Lacy) (2 plays, 75 yards, 0:24)	USA 21–14
4	00:39	CCU	Bryce Carpenter 2-yard rush (Massimo Biscardi kick) (10 plays, 82 yards, 3:45)	TIE 21–21
1OT		CCU	Grayson McCall 25-yard rush (Massimo Biscardi PAT failed)	CCU 27–21

Statistics	Coastal Carolina	South Alabama
First downs	25	20
Total yards	491	349
Rushing yards	315	-5
Passing yards	176	354
Turnovers	3	3
Time of possession	32:52	27:08

Team	Category	Player	Statistics
Coastal Carolina	Passing	Grayson McCall	16/25, 176 yards, 1 TD, 1 INT
Coastal Carolina	Rushing	Shermari Jones	23 carries, 211 yards, 1 TD
Coastal Carolina	Receiving	Jaivon Heiligh	6 receptions, 87 yards, 1 TD
South Alabama	Passing	Jake Bentley	28/41, 354 yards, 2 TDs, 3 INTs
South Alabama	Rushing	Terrion Avery	6 carries, 11 yards
South Alabama	Receiving	Jalen Tolbert	10 receptions, 191 yards, 1 TD

=== Vs. Northern Illinois (Cure Bowl) ===
Northern Illinois vs. Coastal Carolina

Team	1	2	3	4	Total
Huskies	10	14	14	3	41
• Chanticleers	6	13	14	14	47

- Date: December 17, 2021
- Location: Exploria Stadium
  Orlando, FL
- Game start: 6:00 p.m. EST
- Elapsed time: 3 hours and 42 minutes
- Game attendance: 9,784
- Game weather: 74 °F (23 °C) • Weather: Fair • Wind: E 8 MPH
- Referee: Scott Hardin
- TV announcers (ESPN2): Mike Morgan (play–by–play), Kirk Morrison (analyst) and Dawn Davenport (sideline reporter)

Scoring summary
1	9:51	NIU	Cole Tucker 5-yard pass from Rocky Lombardi (John Richardson kick) (11 plays, 75 yards, 5:09)	NIU 7–0
1	5:13	CCU	Braydon Bennett 13-yard run (Massimo Biscardi PAT blocked) (10 plays, 75 yards, 4:38)	NIU 7–6
1	1:43	NIU	John Richardson 41-yard field goal (8 plays, 34 yards, 3:30)	NIU 10–6
2	13:46	CCU	Aaron Bedgood 40-yard pass from Grayson McCall (Massimo Biscardi kick) (9 plays, 79 yards, 2:57)	CCU 13–10
2	8:35	NIU	Clin Ratkovich 2-yard run (John Richardson kick) (9 plays, 68 yards, 5:11)	NIU 17–13
2	5:48	CCU	Massimo Biscardi 27-yard field goal (8 plays, 58 yards, 2:47)	NIU 17–16
2	1:12	NIU	Miles Joiner 12-yard pass from Rocky Lombardi (John Richardson kick) (10 plays, 67 yards, 4:36)	NIU 24–16
2	0:05	CCU	Massimo Biscardi 43-yard field goal (10 plays, 44 yards, 1:07)	NIU 24–19
3	12:34	CCU	Isaiah Likely 27-yard pass from Grayson McCall (Massimo Biscardi kick) (5 plays, 75 yards, 2:26)	CCU 26–24
3	10:08	NIU	Rocky Lombardi 1-yard run (John Richardson kick) (5 plays, 79 yards, 2:26)	NIU 31–26
3	9:27	CCU	Braydon Bennett 60-yard run (Massimo Biscardi kick) (2 plays, 75 yards, 0:41)	CCU 33–31
3	3:13	NIU	Antario Brown 7-yard run (John Richardson kick) (10 plays, 67 yards, 6:14)	NIU 38–33
4	11:51	NIU	John Richardson 45-yard field goal (9 plays, 28 yards, 4:03)	NIU 41–33
4	9:07	CCU	Isaiah Likely 40-yard pass from Grayson McCall (two-point pass conversion attempt failed) (6 plays, 64 yards, 2:44)	NIU 41–39
4	6:40	CCU	Braydon Bennett 34-yard pass from Grayson McCall (two-point pass conversion attempt failed) (1 play, 34 yards, 0:09)	CCU 47–41

Statistics	Northern Illinois	Coastal Carolina
First downs	29	22
Total yards	516	514
Rushing yards	335	199
Passing yards	181	315
Turnovers	0	1
Time of possession	39:20	20:40

Team	Category	Player	Statistics
Northern Illinois	Passing	Rocky Lombardi	20/33, 181 yards, 2 TDs
Northern Illinois	Rushing	Jay Ducker	24 carries, 154 yards
Northern Illinois	Receiving	Cole Tucker	6 receptions, 87 yards, 1 TD
Coastal Carolina	Passing	Grayson McCall	22/30, 315 yards, 4 TDs
Coastal Carolina	Rushing	Braydon Bennett	6 carries, 113 yards, 2 TDs
Coastal Carolina	Receiving	Isaiah Likely	7 receptions, 96 yards, 2 TDs

== Personnel ==
2021 Coastal Carolina Chanticleers football team roster
Players
Coaches
Offense

Pos.	#	Name	Class
WR	0	Deon Fountain	So
RB	2	Reese White	Jr
WR	3	Aaron Bedgood	So
TE	4	Isaiah Likely	Sr
RB	5	Shermari Jones	Sr
WR	6	Jaivon Heiligh	Sr
QB	7	Jarrett Guest	So
WR	8	Ty Lyles	Fr
WR	9	Tyler Roberts	Jr
QB	10	Grayson McCall	So
WR	11	Kameron Brown	Sr
QB	12	Bryce Carpenter	Sr
RB	13	Max Balthazar	Fr
WR	14	Jared Brown	Fr
WR	15	Drew Leszczynski	So
WR	16	Tyson Mobley	So
RB	17	Randall Brown	So
QB	18	Zachary Stevens	So
RB	19	Nate Hope II	So
WR	20	Greg Latushko	Sr
TE	21	Logan Mauldin	Fr
TE	22	DJ Johnson	Fr
RB	23	Braydon Bennett	Fr
RB	25	Christian Malloy	Jr
RB	26	Isaiah Connelly	Fr
RB	27	CJ Beasley	Fr
WR	28	Fred Jackson	Jr
TE	33	Nic Burroughs-Rogers	So
WR	38	Kyre Duplessis	Fr
TE	40	Patrick McSweeney	Jr
OL	50	Jordan Donald	Jr
OL	51	Sam Thompson	Sr
OL	53	Kip Green	Fr
OL	56	Donnell Wilson	So
OL	57	Willie Lampkin	So
OL	58	Thomas Johnson	Fr
OL	59	Jared Morrow	Fr
OL	60	Rakim Cooper	Fr
OL	63	Trey Carter	Sr
OL	65	Jayden Addison	So
OL	66	Will McDonald	So
OL	67	Donavan Manson	Fr
OL	68	Caleb Godfree	Fr
OL	69	Willie Moise	Fr
OL	71	Isaac Owusu-Appiah	So
OL	72	Antwine Loper	Sr
OL	73	Anthony Walton	Fr
OL	74	Zovon Lindsay	So
OL	75	Mason Bowers	Fr
OL	76	Kameren Stewart	Jr
OL	77	Tom Bambrick	Fr
OL	78	Tyler Wagner	Fr
OL	79	Steven Bedosky	Sr
WR	80	Chris Rhone	Fr
WR	82	Jameson Tucker	Fr
WR	84	Nick Childs	So
TE	85	Xavier Gravette	Jr
TE	86	TJ Ivy Jr.	Jr
WR	87	Malachi Taylor	Fr
WR	88	Conner McCarthy	Jr

Defense

Pos.	#	Name	Class
DT	0	Josaiah Stewart	Fr
LB	1	Shane Bruce	So
CB	1	Derick Bush	Sr
CB	2	D'Jordan Strong	Sr
LB	3	JT Killen	So
LB	4	Kendricks Gladney Jr.	Sr
DL	5	Travis Geiger Jr.	Jr
CB	6	Lance Boykin	Jr
LB	7	Luke Ellenberger	So
S	8	Tré Douglas III	Jr
CB	9	Manny Stokes Jr.	So
S	10	Alex Spillum	Sr
DE	11	Amadou Fofana	Sr
LB	12	Isaiah Stephens	So
S	13	Mateo Sudipo	So
LB	14	Kiylan Miller	Fr
DL	15	Jerrod Clark	Jr
CB	16	Jordan Morris	Jr
CB	17	Myles Baker	So
S	18	Tobias Fletcher	Fr
S	19	Dre Pinckney	Fr
LB	20	Mason Shelton	Fr
CB	21	Charles Arnold Jr.	Fr
LB	22	Coleman Reich	So
CB	23	Jacob Proche	Jr
LB	25	Jamar Darboe	Jr
S	26	Brayden Matts	Sr
LB	27	Aaron Diggs	Fr
S	28	Shi'heem Watkins	Jr
LB	29	Silas Kelly	Sr
LB	30	Shon Brown	Fr
LB	31	Ze'Marion Harrell	Fr
LB	32	Charles Steele	So
S	33	Austin Randall	So
DE	34	Wilt Gabe II	So
LB	34	Teddy Gallagher	Sr
CB	35	Jaimeer Goodman	Jr
LB	36	Joah Cash	Fr
CB	37	De'Angelo Huskey	Jr
DE	40	Braylon Ryan	Fr
LB	41	Myles Olufemi	Sr
LB	43	Enock Makonzo	Sr
LB	44	E. J. Porter	Sr
LB	46	Kenny Byrd	Fr
LB	47	Justin Scola	Jr
LB	48	Bailey Carraway	Fr
S	49	Cameron Mitchell	Fr
DT	52	C. J. Brewer	Sr
LB	54	Luke Evans	Fr
DT	90	Rolan Wooden II	Jr
DE	91	Emmanuel Johnson	So
DT	92	Mark Milnac	So
DL	93	James Johnson Jr.	Fr
LB	94	Jeffrey Gunter	Sr
DL	95	Tate Finklea	Fr
DE	97	Johnny Magee	So
DE	98	Travis Batts	Fr
DL	99	Kennedy Roberts	Jr

Special teams

Pos.	#	Name	Class
K	29	Massimo Biscardi	Sr
K	31	Liam Gray	Fr
P, K	35	Kieran Colahan	So
K	36	Kade Hensley	Fr
LS	49	Jayden Perry	So
LS	55	CJ Schrimpf	Sr
LS	81	Payton Bunch	So
P, K	95	Mack West	Fr
P, K	98	Charles Ouverson	Sr

Head coach

- Jamey Chadwell (East Tennessee State)

Coordinators/assistant coaches

- Chad Staggs (South Carolina)
  Defensive coordinator/s
- Newland Isaac (North Greenville)
  Co-offensive coordinator/rb
- Willy Korn (Clemson)
  Co-offensive coordinator/qb
- Malcolm Dixon (Charleston Southern)
  Tight ends
- Bill Durkin (Massachusetts)
  Offensive line
- Bryant Foster (Gardner–Webb)
  Defensive backs
- Skylor Magee (Southern Miss)
  Defensive line
- Josh Miller (Appalachian State)
  Outside linebackers
- Tony Washington (Appalachian State)
  Wide receivers
- Rod Wilson (South Carolina)
  Inside linebackers

Legend

- (C) Team captain
- (S) Suspended
- (I) Ineligible
- Injured
- Redshirt

Roster
Last update: 3 July 2021
