= Jeffrey Gunter =

American football player (born 1999)

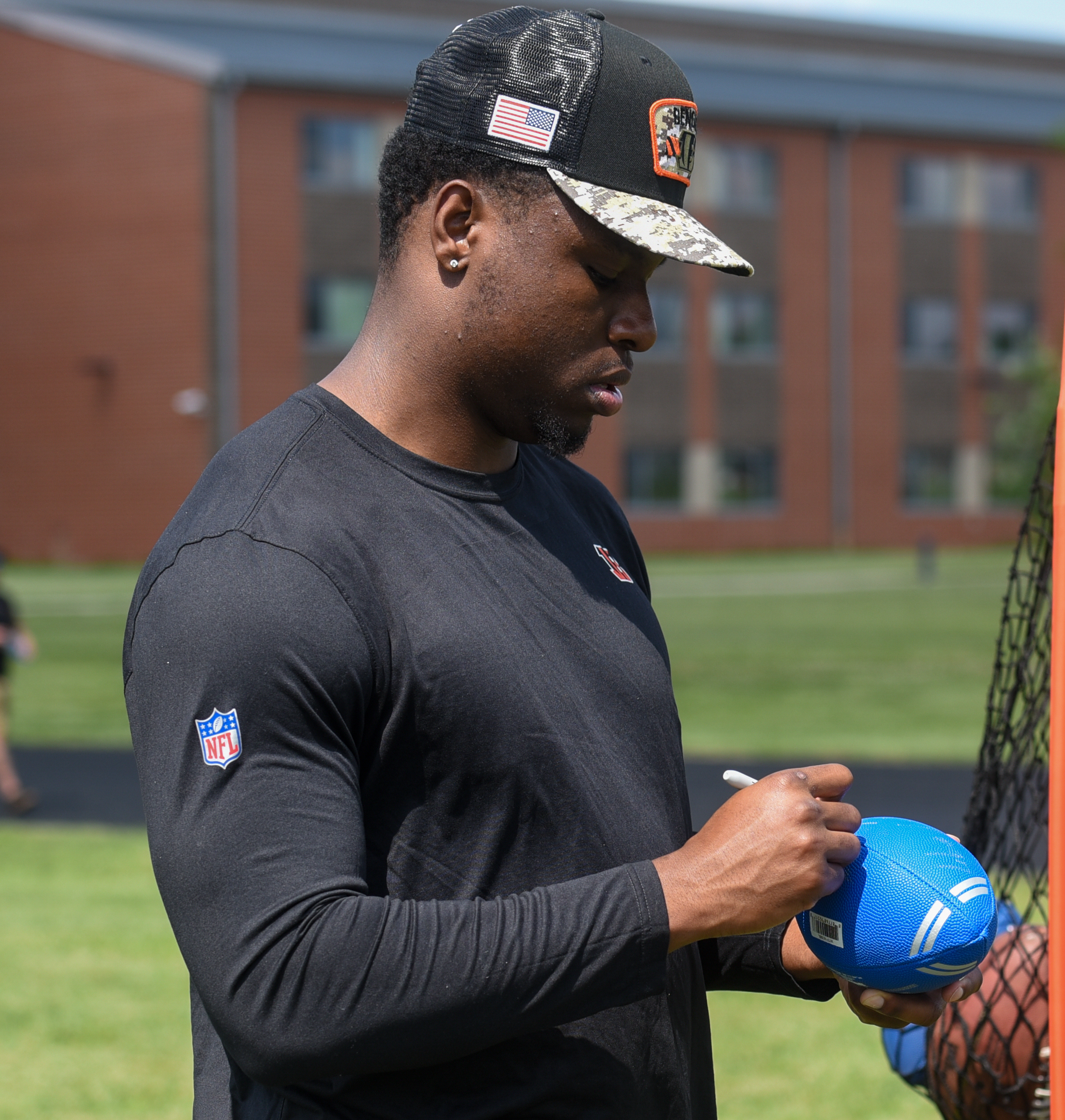
- Gunter at Wright-Patterson Air Force Base in 2022

Liberty Flames
- Title: Defensive graduate assistant

Personal information
- Born: June 1, 1999 (age 27); Durham, North Carolina, U.S.
- Listed height: 6 ft 4 in (1.93 m)
- Listed weight: 263 lb (119 kg)

Career information
- High school: Riverside (Durham, North Carolina)
- College: Coastal Carolina (2017–2018, 2020–2021); NC State (2019)
- NFL draft: 2022: 7th round, 252nd overall pick

Career history

Playing
- Cincinnati Bengals (2022–2023)

Coaching
- Liberty (2026–present) Graduate assistant

Awards and highlights
- 2× First-team All-Sun Belt (2018, 2020); Second-team All-Sun Belt (2021)

Career NFL statistics
- Total tackles: 1
- Stats at Pro Football Reference

Jeffrey Gunter (born June 1, 1999) is an American former professional football player who was a defensive end for two seasons in the National Football League (NFL). He played college football for the Coastal Carolina Chanticleers and NC State Wolfpack and was selected by the Cincinnati Bengals in the seventh round of the 2022 NFL draft.

== Early life ==
Gunter grew up in Durham, North Carolina and attended Riverside High School.

== College career ==
Gunter played in all 12 of Coastal Carolina's games as a freshman. He became a starter going into his sophomore season and was named first-team All-Sun Belt Conference after recording 49 tackles and 14 tackles for loss. Following the end of the season, Gunter left the program and transferred to North Carolina State in order to be closer to home. After sitting out one year due to NCAA transfer rules, he opted to transfer back to Coastal Carolina. In his first season back with the Chanticleers, Gunter was again named first-team All-Sun Belt after finishing the year with 58 tackles, 12.5 tackles for loss, and 6.5 sacks. He was named second-team All-Sun Belt as a redshirt senior.

== Professional career ==
Pre-draft measurables
Height	Weight	Arm length	Hand span	Wingspan	40-yard dash	10-yard split	20-yard split	20-yard shuttle	Three-cone drill	Vertical jump	Broad jump	Bench press
6 ft 4 3/8 in (1.94 m)	258 lb (117 kg)	33 in (0.84 m)	9 1/4 in (0.23 m)	6 ft 7 7/8 in (2.03 m)	4.70 s	1.57 s	2.70 s	4.35 s	7.21 s	35.5 in (0.90 m)	10 ft 2 in (3.10 m)	30 reps
All values from NFL Combine/Pro Day

Gunter was selected by the Cincinnati Bengals in the seventh round (252nd overall) of the 2022 NFL draft. He took the bulk of his snaps with the team on special teams, and finished the regular season with one assisted tackle. He was a healthy inactive for all three of the Bengals' playoff games.

Gunter was waived by the Bengals on August 29, 2023, and re-signed to the practice squad the following day. Following the end of the 2023 regular season, the Bengals signed him to a reserve/future contract on January 8, 2024. He announced his retirement from the NFL on August 14, 2024.

== Career statistics ==
=== NFL ===
Year	Team	Games		Tackles					Interceptions						Fumbles				
Year	Team	GP	GS	Cmb	Solo	Ast	Sck	TFL	Int	Yds	Avg	Lng	TD	PD	FF	Fum	FR	Yds	TD
2022	CIN	10	0	1	0	1	0.0	0	0	0	0.0	0	0	0	0	0	0	0	0
Career		10	0	1	0	1	0.0	0	0	0	0.0	0	0	0	0	0	0	0	0

=== College ===
Legend
	Led the NCAA
**Bold**	Career high

Season	Team	Games		Tackles					Interceptions					Fumbles			
Season	Team	GP	GS	Solo	Ast	Cmb	TfL	Sck	Int	Yds	Avg	TD	PD	FR	Yds	TD	FF
2017	Coastal Carolina	12	1	11	15	26	3.5	0.0	0	0	0.0	0	0	0	0	0	0
2018	Coastal Carolina	12	12	29	20	49	**14.0**	5.0	0	0	0.0	0	**2**	0	0	0	1
2019	NC State	0	0	Ineligible to play to due NCAA transfer rules													
2020	Coastal Carolina	12	12	**35**	**23**	**58**	12.5	**6.5**	**1**	**3**	**3.0**	0	1	0	0	0	**6**
2021	Coastal Carolina	12	12	21	20	41	10.0	**6.5**	0	0	0.0	0	1	**1**	0	0	2
Career		48	37	96	78	174	40.0	18.0	1	3	3.0	0	4	1	0	0	9
