= 2021 Camellia Bowl =

Postseason college football bowl game

2021 TaxAct Camellia Bowl
- 8th Camellia Bowl
Georgia State Panthers	Ball State Cardinals
(7–5)	(6–6)
Sun Belt	MAC
51	20
Head coach: Shawn Elliott	Head coach: Mike Neu
	1	2	3	4	Total
Georgia State	14	6	28	3	51
Ball State	7	6	0	7	20
- Date: December 25, 2021
- Season: 2021
- Stadium: Cramton Bowl
- Location: Montgomery, Alabama
- MVP: Darren Grainger (QB, Georgia State)
- Favorite: Georgia State by 4.5
- Referee: Kevin Vicknair (C-USA)
- Attendance: 7,345

United States TV coverage
- Network: ESPN
- Announcers: Roy Philpott (play-by-play), Hutson Mason (analyst), and Abby Labar (sideline)

International TV coverage
- Network: ESPN Brazil
- Announcers: Matheus Pinheiro (play-by-play) and Weinny Eirado (analyst)

The 2021 Camellia Bowl was a college football bowl game played on December 25, 2021, at the Cramton Bowl in Montgomery, Alabama. The eighth edition of the Camellia Bowl, the game featured the Georgia State Panthers of the Sun Belt Conference and the Ball State Cardinals of the Mid-American Conference. The game began at 1:30 p.m. CST and aired on ESPN. It was one of the 2021–22 bowl games concluding the 2021 FBS football season. Sponsored by tax preparation software company TaxAct, the game was known as the TaxAct Camellia Bowl.

== Teams ==
Consistent with conference tie-ins, the game was played between teams from the Sun Belt Conference and Mid-American Conference (MAC).

This was the third meeting between Georgia State and Ball State; entering the game, the all-time series was tied at 1–1.

== Game summary ==
2021 TaxAct Camellia Bowl

Quarter	1	2	3	4	Total
Georgia State	14	6	28	3	51
Ball State	7	6	0	7	20

at Cramton Bowl • Montgomery, Alabama

- Date: Saturday, December 25, 2021
- Game time: 2:30 p.m. EST (1:30 p.m. local CST)
- Game weather: Partly cloudy • Temperature: 75 °F (24 °C) • Wind: SW 13 mph
- Referee: Kevin Vicknair
- TV announcers (ESPN): Roy Philpott (play-by-play), Hutson Mason (analyst), and Abby Labar (sideline)
- Box score

Scoring summary

Quarter	Time	Drive			Team	Scoring information	Score	
Quarter	Time	Plays	Yards	TOP	Team	Scoring information	GSU	BSU
1	8:59	2	61	0:38	Ball State	Jayshon Jackson 56-yard touchdown reception from Drew Plitt, Jake Chanove kick good	0	7
1	4:55	10	75	4:04	Georgia State	Aubry Payne 18-yard touchdown reception from Darren Grainger, Noel Ruiz kick good	7	7
1	2:02				Georgia State	Fumble recovery returned 37 yards for touchdown by Javon Denis, Noel Ruiz kick good	14	7
2	14:11	7	24	1:48	Georgia State	27-yard field goal by Noel Ruiz	17	7
2	9:20	7	30	2:06	Ball State	34-yard field goal by Jacob Lewis	17	10
2	6:01	8	65	3:19	Georgia State	28-yard field goal by Noel Ruiz	20	10
2	0:18	13	53	5:43	Ball State	43-yard field goal by Jacob Lewis	20	13
3	12:05	8	75	2:55	Georgia State	Robert Lewis 10-yard touchdown reception from Darren Grainger, Noel Ruiz kick good	27	13
3	7:08	7	68	3:29	Georgia State	Darren Grainger 34-yard touchdown run, Noel Ruiz kick good	34	13
3	1:33	5	71	1:37	Georgia State	Aubry Payne 16-yard touchdown reception from Darren Grainger, Noel Ruiz kick good	41	13
3	0:00				Georgia State	Interception returned 55 yards for touchdown by Antavious Lane, Noel Ruiz kick good	48	13
4	9:03	8	38	3:27	Georgia State	45-yard field goal by Noel Ruiz	51	13
4	3:13	15	75	5:50	Ball State	Drew Plitt 1-yard touchdown run, Jake Chanove kick good	51	20
"TOP" = time of possession. For other American football terms, see Glossary of American football.							51	20

== Statistics ==
=== Team statistics ===
Team statistical comparison
Statistic	GSU	BSU
First downs	21	22
First downs rushing	13	4
First downs passing	7	14
First downs penalty	1	4
Third down efficiency	6–11	8–18
Fourth down efficiency	0–0	1–3
Total plays–net yards	62–464	81–367
Rushing attempts–net yards	41–259	35–74
Yards per rush	6.3	2.1
Yards passing	205	293
Pass completions–attempts	17–21	27–46
Interceptions thrown	0	1
Punt returns–total yards	0–0	1–(−3)
Kickoff returns–total yards	0–0	6–137
Punts–average yardage	2–37.5	3–40.0
Fumbles–lost	0–0	3–1
Penalties–yards	7–85	3–32
Time of possession	26:46	33:14

=== Individual statistics ===
Georgia State statistics
Panthers passing
	C–A	Yds	TD–INT
Darren Grainger	15–19	203	3–0
Mikele Colasurdo	2–2	2	0–0
Panthers rushing
	Car	Yds	TD
Darren Grainger	11	122	1
Tucker Gregg	16	54	0
Jaymest Williams	8	49	0
Antoine Lane	3	24	0
Jamari Thrash	1	5	0
Marcus Carroll	1	4	0
Cornelius McCoy	1	1	0
Panthers receiving
	Rec	Yds	TD
Aubry Payne	8	109	2
Robert Lewis	2	30	1
Terrance Dixon	1	24	0
Cornelius McCoy	1	19	0
Ja'Cyais Credle	1	10	0
Sam Pinckney	1	6	0
Jamari Thrash	1	5	0
Donavon Grier	2	2	0

Ball State statistics
Cardinals passing
	C–A	Yds	TD–INT
Drew Plitt	27–46	293	1–1
Cardinals rushing
	Car	Yds	TD
Carson Steele	15	62	0
Jayshon Jackson	4	12	0
Rico Barfield	3	12	0
Will Jones	3	4	0
Donny Marcus	1	3	0
Drew Plitt	9	−19	1
Cardinals receiving
	Rec	Yds	TD
Jayshon Jackson	12	146	1
Yo'Heinz Tyler	5	52	0
Carson Steele	3	40	0
Trevor Hohlt	4	37	0
Hassan Littles	1	11	0
Will Jones	2	7	0
