= 2021 Georgia State Panthers football team =

American college football season

2021 Georgia State Panthers football

Camellia Bowl champion

Camellia Bowl, W 51–20 vs. Ball State
- Conference: Sun Belt Conference
- East Division
- Record: 8–5 (6–2 Sun Belt)
- Head coach: Shawn Elliott (5th season)
- Offensive coordinator: Brad Glenn (3rd season)
- Offensive scheme: Spread
- Defensive coordinator: Nate Fuqua (5th season)
- Base defense: 4–2–5
- Home stadium: Center Parc Stadium

2021 Sun Belt Conference football standings
	Conf.			Overall
Team	W		L	W		L
East Division
Appalachian State xy	7	–	1	10	–	4
Georgia State	6	–	2	8	–	5
Coastal Carolina	6	–	2	11	–	2
Troy	3	–	5	5	–	7
Georgia Southern	2	–	6	3	–	9
West Division
No. 16 Louisiana xy$	8	–	0	13	–	1
Texas State	3	–	5	4	–	8
Louisiana–Monroe	2	–	6	4	–	8
South Alabama	2	–	6	5	–	7
Arkansas State	1	–	7	2	–	10
Championship: Louisiana 24, Appalachian State 16
$ – Conference champion; x – Division champion/co-champions; y – Championship game participant; Rankings from AP Poll

The 2021 Georgia State Panthers football team represented Georgia State University (GSU) during the 2021 NCAA Division I FBS football season. The Panthers were led by fifth-year head coach Shawn Elliott. This was the Panthers' ninth season in the Sun Belt Conference, fourth within the East Division, and 12th since the inception of the program. They played their home games at Center Parc Stadium. It was the first 8 win season in program history.

== Preseason ==
=== Recruiting class ===
College recruiting information
Name	Hometown	School	Height	Weight	40^{‡}	Commit date
Jaylin Tolbert; WR	Greenwood, SC	Greenwood HS	6 ft 3 in (1.91 m)	200 lb (91 kg)	–	Dec 16, 2020
Jaylin Tolbert; WR	Recruit ratings: Scout: Rivals: 247Sports: ESPN:					
Omarion Hammond; DE	Columbia, SC	AC Flora HS	6 ft 3 in (1.91 m)	250 lb (110 kg)	–	Dec 16, 2020
Omarion Hammond; DE	Recruit ratings: Scout: Rivals: 247Sports: ESPN:					
Makkah "MJ" Jordan; S	St. Petersburg, FL	Calvary Christian	5 ft 10 in (1.78 m)	180 lb (82 kg)	–	Dec 16, 2020
Makkah "MJ" Jordan; S	Recruit ratings: Scout: Rivals: 247Sports: ESPN:					
Fuches "Deuce" Lewis II; NT	Savannah, GA	Calvary Day	6 ft 3 in (1.91 m)	290 lb (130 kg)	–	Dec 16, 2020
Fuches "Deuce" Lewis II; NT	Recruit ratings: Scout: Rivals: 247Sports: ESPN:					
Jordan Jones; ILB	Smiths Station, AL	Smiths Station HS	6 ft 0 in (1.83 m)	210 lb (95 kg)	–	Dec 16, 2020
Jordan Jones; ILB	Recruit ratings: Scout: Rivals: 247Sports: ESPN:					
Tony McCray Jr. CB	Clarksdale, MS	Lake Cormorant HS	5 ft 11 in (1.80 m)	170 lb (77 kg)	–	Dec 16, 2020
Tony McCray Jr. CB	Recruit ratings: Scout: Rivals: 247Sports: ESPN:					
Tylon Dunlap; DE	Charlotte, NC	Harding University HS	6 ft 1 in (1.85 m)	230 lb (100 kg)	–	Dec 16, 2020
Tylon Dunlap; DE	Recruit ratings: Scout: Rivals: 247Sports: ESPN:					
Marquez Bargman; OL	Port St. Joe, FL	Treasure Coast HS	6 ft 3 in (1.91 m)	285 lb (129 kg)	–	Dec 16, 2020
Marquez Bargman; OL	Recruit ratings: Scout: Rivals: 247Sports: ESPN:					
Christopher Davis Jr. LB	Seffner, FL	Armwood HS	6 ft 3 in (1.91 m)	215 lb (98 kg)	–	Dec 16, 2020
Christopher Davis Jr. LB	Recruit ratings: Scout: Rivals: 247Sports: ESPN:					
Jaquan Dixon; RB	Loris, SC	Green Sea Floyds HS	5 ft 11 in (1.80 m)	175 lb (79 kg)	–	Dec 16, 2020
Jaquan Dixon; RB	Recruit ratings: Scout: Rivals: 247Sports: ESPN:					
Montavious Cunningham; OL	Athens, GA	Clarke Central HS	6 ft 3 in (1.91 m)	285 lb (129 kg)	–	Dec 16, 2020
Montavious Cunningham; OL	Recruit ratings: Scout: Rivals: 247Sports: ESPN:					
Jamarion Ellis; OLB/DE	Eastman, GA	IMG Academy	6 ft 2 in (1.88 m)	240 lb (110 kg)	–	Dec 16, 2020
Jamarion Ellis; OLB/DE	Recruit ratings: Scout: Rivals: 247Sports: ESPN:					
Evan Graham; OLB	St. Petersburg, FL	Boca Ciega HS	6 ft 1 in (1.85 m)	225 lb (102 kg)	–	Dec 16, 2020
Evan Graham; OLB	Recruit ratings: Scout: Rivals: 247Sports: ESPN:					
Brylan Lanier; CB	Tuscaloosa, AL	Paul W. Bryant HS	6 ft 1 in (1.85 m)	170 lb (77 kg)	–	Dec 16, 2020
Brylan Lanier; CB	Recruit ratings: Scout: Rivals: 247Sports: ESPN:					
Darren Grainger; QB	Conway, SC	Conway HS; Furman	6 ft 4 in (1.93 m)	200 lb (91 kg)	–	Jan 1, 2021
Darren Grainger; QB	Recruit ratings: Scout: Rivals: 247Sports: ESPN:					
Shamar McCollum; OLB	Hamer, SC	Dillon HS; Wake Forest	6 ft 4 in (1.93 m)	200 lb (91 kg)	–	Jan 1, 2021
Shamar McCollum; OLB	Recruit ratings: Scout: Rivals: 247Sports: ESPN:					
Ja'Cyais Credle; WR	Columbus, GA	Carver HS; UCF	6 ft 3 in (1.91 m)	220 lb (100 kg)	–	Jan 1, 2021
Ja'Cyais Credle; WR	Recruit ratings: Scout: Rivals: 247Sports: ESPN:					
Cameron Dye; OL	Alpharetta, GA	Milton HS	6 ft 4 in (1.93 m)	265 lb (120 kg)	–	Feb 3, 2021
Cameron Dye; OL	Recruit ratings: Scout: Rivals: 247Sports: ESPN:					

=== Award watch lists ===
Listed in the order that they were released

==== Preseason ====
Award	Player	Position	Year
Doak Walker Award	Destin Coates	RB	SR
Biletnikoff Award	Sam Pinckney	WR	RS-JR
Mackey Award	Roger Carter	TE	SR
Outland Trophy	Shamarious Gilmore	OL	SR
Manning Award	Cornelious Brown IV	QB	RS-SO

=== Sun Belt coaches poll ===
The Sun Belt coaches poll was released on July 20, 2021. The Panthers were picked to finish third in the East Division.

=== Sun Belt Preseason All-Conference teams ===
Offense

1st team

- Destin Coates – Running Back, SR
- Shamarious Gilmore – Offensive Lineman, RS-SR
- Sam Pinckney – Wide Receiver, RS-JR

2nd team

- Roger Carter – Tight End, SR
- Cornelius McCoy – Wide Receiver, SR

Defense

2nd team

- Hardrick Willis – Defensive Lineman, RS-SR
- Dontae Wilson – Defensive Lineman, SR
- Antavious Lane – Defensive Back, RS-SO
- Quavian White – Defensive Back, SR

Special teams

1st team

- Noel Ruiz – Kicker, SR

== Personnel ==
2021 Georgia State Panthers football team roster
Players
Coaches
Offense

Pos.	#	Name	Class
WR	0	Terrance Dixon	Sr
WR	2	Jamari Thrash	So
QB	3	Darren Grainger	Jr
QB	4	Cornelious Brown IV	So
TE	5	Roger Carter	Sr
WR	8	Ja'Cyais Credle	So
WR	9	Jacob Freeman	Fr
QB	10	Mikele Colasurdo	Fr
WR	11	Cadarrius Thompson	Jr
QB	12	Stratton Tripp	Fr
WR	13	Christian Thomas	Fr
WR	14	Robert Lewis	Fr
WR	15	Sam Pinckney	Jr
WR	16	Tailique Williams	Fr
RB	17	Destin Coates	Sr
RB	18	Jaquan Dixon	Fr
RB	21	Jamyest Williams	Sr
RB	23	Marcus Carroll	So
RB	24	Antoine Lane	Jr
RB	25	Dawson Hill	Jr
RB	26	Tucker Gregg	Sr
RB	31	Makari Pruitt	So
TE	35	Herman McCray	Jr
OL	60	Ronald Folkes	So
OL	61	Cameron Dye	Fr
OL	62	Malik Sumter	Sr
OL	64	Pat Bartlett	Sr
OL	65	Avery Reece	So
OL	67	Ben Chukwuma	Sr
OL	68	Mason Cook	Fr
OL	69	Marquez Bargman	Fr
OL	70	Chandler Durham	Fr
OL	71	Cameron Golden	So
OL	72	Luis Cristobal	So
OL	73	Travis Glover	Jr
OL	74	Despelado Alexandre	Jr
OL	75	Shamarious Gilmore	Sr
OL	76	Jonathan Brown	Fr
OL	77	Johnathan Bass	Jr
OL	78	Trey Bonner	So
OL	79	Montavious Cunningham	Fr
WR	80	Matlin Marshall	Sr
WR	81	Spencer Gaddis	Jr
WR	82	Jaylin Tolbert	Fr
WR	83	Cornelius McCoy	Sr
TE	84	Kris Byrd	Fr
TE	85	Ahmon Green	So
TE	86	Ezeqiel Marion	Fr
WR	87	Donavon Grier	Sr
TE	88	Aubry Payne	Sr
WR	89	Kellan Autenrieth	Fr

Defense

Pos.	#	Name	Class
OLB	1	Jontrey Hunter	Jr
S	3	Chris Bacon	Sr
CB	5	Bryquice Brown	So
OLB	7	DeAndre Bowman	Sr
S	8	Jaquez Pennimon	So
OLB	9	Jamil Muhammad	So
OLB	10	Jacorey Crawford	Sr
S	12	Tyler Gore	Sr
OLB	17	Shamar McCollum	Jr
CB	18	Cameron Sims	So
CB	19	Tony McCray	Fr
CB	20	Quavian White	Sr
S	22	Jalen Tate	Fr
OLB	23	Terrell Gordon	So
S	24	Tyreke Harrison	So
CB	27	Jaylon Jones	Sr
S	28	Chris Moore	Sr
CB	29	Courtney Williams	Jr
S	30	Makkah Jordan	Fr
S	31	Ronald Cooper	Fr
ILB	32	Zach Dixon	Jr
DE	33	T. J. Smith	Jr
S	34	Antavious Lane	So
S	35	Keon Carter	Sr
ILB	37	Evan Graham	Fr
ILB	38	Kyle Wright	Jr
ILB	40	Jordan Veneziale	Jr
DL	41	Ikenine Ochie	Sr
ILB	42	Blake Carroll	Sr
OLB	43	Chris Davis Jr.	Fr
OLB	44	Jay Lepkoske	So
ILB	45	Jordan Jones	Fr
OLB	47	Jhi'Shawn Taylor	Sr
ILB	48	Justin Abraham	Fr
ILB	49	Joseph Lopez	So
DL	50	Tylon Dunlap	Fr
DL	52	Dontae Wilson	Sr
ILB	53	Markland Davis	Jr
DE	54	Tre Moore	Jr
DL	56	Fuches Lewis II	Fr
ILB	57	Marcus Anderson	So
DL	58	Jamarion Ellis	Fr
DL	59	Thomas Gore	So
DE	90	Hardrick Willis	Sr
DL	91	Jeffery Clark	So
DL	93	Jeremy Butler	Fr
DL	95	Santanna Willis	Fr
DE	96	Miles Dickens	So
DL	97	Akeem Smith	Jr
DE	98	Javon Denis	So
DL	99	Omarion Hammond	Fr

Special teams

Pos.	#	Name	Class
K, P	39	Michael Hayes	So
P, K	46	Tristan Lyon	Fr
LS	51	Charlie Flint	Sr
LS	56	Collin Westfelt	Fr
LS	66	Seth Glausier	Jr
K	92	Noel Ruiz	Sr
K, P	94	Kade Loggins	Fr

Head coach

- Shawn Elliott (Appalachian State)

Coordinators/assistant coaches

- Nate Fuqua (Wofford)
  Defensive coordinator/olb
- Brad Glenn (Clemson)
  Offensive coordinator/qb
- Dan Ellington (Georgia State)
  Running backs
- Brian Landis (Georgetown)
  Inside linebackers
- Trent McKnight (Samford)
  Wide receivers
- Eman Naghavi (McNeese State)
  Offensive linemen
- Cory Peoples (South Carolina)
  Cornerbacks
- Travian Robertson (South Carolina)
  Defensive linemen
- Josh Stepp (University of Phoenix)
  Tight ends

Legend

- (C) Team captain
- (S) Suspended
- (I) Ineligible
- Injured
- Redshirt

Roster
Last update: 5 July 2021

== Schedule ==
The 2021 schedule consisted of 6 home and 6 away games in the regular season. The Panthers would travel to Sun Belt foes Louisiana–Monroe, Georgia Southern, Louisiana, and Coastal Carolina. Georgia State would play host to Sun Belt foes Appalachian State, Texas State, Arkansas State, and Troy.

The Panthers would host two of the three non-conference opponents at Center Parc Stadium, Army, a FBS Independent and Charlotte of the Conference USA, and would travel to North Carolina of the Atlantic Coast Conference and Auburn of the Southeastern Conference.

Date	Time	Opponent	Site	TV	Result	Attendance
September 4	12:00 p.m.	Army*	Center Parc Stadium; Atlanta, GA	ESPNU	L 10–43	18,280
September 11	7:30 p.m.	at No. 24 North Carolina*	Kenan Memorial Stadium; Chapel Hill, NC	ACCRSN	L 17–59	50,500
September 18	7:00 p.m.	Charlotte*	Center Parc Stadium; Atlanta, GA	ESPN+	W 20–9	12,978
September 25	4:00 p.m.	at No. 23 Auburn*	Jordan–Hare Stadium; Auburn, AL	SECN	L 24–34	86,650
October 2	2:00 p.m.	Appalachian State	Center Parc Stadium; Atlanta, GA	ESPN+	L 16–45	14,258
October 9	8:00 p.m.	at Louisiana–Monroe	Malone Stadium; Monroe, LA	ESPN3	W 55–21	9,913
October 23	2:00 p.m.	Texas State	Center Parc Stadium; Atlanta, GA	ESPN+	W 28–16	16,779
October 30	6:00 p.m.	at Georgia Southern	Paulson Stadium; Statesboro, GA (Modern Day Hate)	ESPN+	W 21–14	17,843
November 4	7:30 p.m.	at Louisiana	Cajun Field; Lafayette, LA	ESPN	L 17–21	16,007
November 13	2:00 p.m.	at Coastal Carolina	Brooks Stadium; Conway, SC	ESPN+	W 42–40	16,744
November 20	2:00 p.m.	Arkansas State	Center Parc Stadium; Atlanta, GA	ESPN3	W 28–20	14,273
November 27	2:00 p.m.	Troy	Center Parc Stadium; Atlanta, GA	ESPN+	W 37–10	13,875
December 25	2:30 p.m.	vs. Ball State*	Cramton Bowl; Montgomery, AL (Camellia Bowl)	ESPN	W 51–20	7,345
*Non-conference game; Rankings from AP Poll (and CFP Rankings, after November 2) - Released prior to game; All times are in Eastern time

== Game summaries ==
=== Army West Point ===
Army West Point at Georgia State

Team	1	2	3	4	Total
• RV Black Knights	14	13	6	10	43
Panthers	0	7	3	0	10

- Date: September 4, 2021
- Location: Center Parc Stadium
  Atlanta, GA
- Game start: 12:02 p.m. EDT
- Elapsed time: 3 hours and 5 minutes
- Game attendance: 18,280
- Game weather: 79 °F (26 °C) • Weather: Sunny • Wind: SE 5 MPH
- Referee: Kyle Olson
- TV announcers (ESPNU): Clay Matvick (play-by-play), Rocky Boiman (analyst) & Tiffany Blackmon (sideline)

Scoring summary
1	09:17	ARMY	Tyson Riley 4-yard rush (Cole Talley kick) (8 plays, 40 yards, 4:30)	ARMY 7–0
1	01:59	ARMY	A. J. Howard Jr. 4-yard rush (Cole Talley kick) (10 plays, 61 yards, 6:09)	ARMY 14–0
2	08:12	ARMY	Jakobi Buchanan 2-yard rush (Cole Talley kick) (13 plays, 53 yards, 7:31)	ARMY 21–0
2	04:03	GSU	Destin Coates 16-yard rush (Noel Ruiz kick) (10 plays, 75 yards, 4:09)	ARMY 21–7
2	00:00	ARMY	Christian Anderson 2-yard rush (Cole Talley PAT blocked) (4 plays, 9 yards, 1:16)	ARMY 27–7
3	09:33	ARMY	Tyrell Robinson 40-yard pass from Christian Anderson (two-point conversion rush attempt failed) (1 play, 40 yards, 0:08)	ARMY 33–7
3	05:09	GSU	Noel Ruiz 33-yard field goal (13 plays, 60 yards, 4:24)	ARMY 33–10
4	12:07	ARMY	Cole Talley 22-yard field goal (13 plays, 60 yards, 8:02)	ARMY 36–10
4	05:29	ARMY	Braheam Murphy 32-yard pass from Jemel Jones (Cole Talley kick) (8 plays, 64 yards, 5:25)	ARMY 43–10

Statistics	Army West Point	Georgia State
First downs	20	14
Total yards	356	177
Rushing yards	258	48
Passing yards	98	129
Turnovers	0	2
Time of possession	42:07	17:53

Team	Category	Player	Statistics
Army West Point	Passing	Christian Anderson	1/2, 40 yards, 1 TD
Army West Point	Rushing	Christian Anderson	15 carries, 55 yards, 1 TD
Army West Point	Receiving	Tyrell Robinson	1 reception, 40 yards, 1 TD
Georgia State	Passing	Cornelious Brown IV	12/20, 129 yards, 1 INT
Georgia State	Rushing	Destin Coates	13 carries, 48 yards, 1 TD
Georgia State	Receiving	Jamari Thrash	7 receptions, 87 yards

=== At North Carolina ===
Georgia State at North Carolina

Team	1	2	3	4	Total
Panthers	3	7	0	7	17
• No. 24 Tar Heels	14	10	21	14	59

- Date: September 11, 2021
- Location: Kenan Memorial Stadium
  Chapel Hill, NC
- Game start: 7:35 p.m. EDT
- Elapsed time: 3 hours and 35 minutes
- Game attendance: 50,500
- Game weather: 75 °F (24 °C) • Weather: Sunny • Wind: S 3 MPH
- Referee: Jeremy Parker
- TV announcers (ESPN3): Tom Werme (play–by–play), James Bates (analyst), and Abby Labar (sideline reporter)

Scoring summary
1	11:45	UNC	Sam Howell 22-yard rush (Grayson Atkins kick) (6 plays, 74 yards, 2:21)	UNC 7–0
1	07:55	UNC	Antoine Green 57-yard pass from Sam Howell (Grayson Atkins kick) (4 plays, 68 yards, 1:16)	UNC 14–0
1	03:28	GSU	Noel Ruiz 37-yard field goal (4 plays, 0 yards, 0:58)	UNC 14–3
2	13:49	UNC	Emery Simmons 30-yard pass from Sam Howell (Grayson Atkins kick) (10 plays, 67 yards, 4:39)	UNC 21–3
2	06:19	GSU	Cornelious Brown IV 4-yard rush (Noel Ruiz kick) (17 plays, 75 yards, 7:30)	UNC 21–10
2	00:56	UNC	Grayson Atkins 29-yard field goal (6 plays, 9 yards, 2:07)	UNC 24–10
3	05:32	UNC	British Brooks 1-yard rush (Grayson Atkins kick) (9 plays, 63 yards, 3:31)	UNC 31–10
3	02:46	UNC	Ty Chandler 2-yard rush (Grayson Atkins kick) (5 plays, 76 yards, 1:49)	UNC 38–10
3	00:08	UNC	Sam Howell 62-yard rush (Grayson Atkins kick) (4 plays, 86 yards, 1:37)	UNC 45–10
4	11:22	UNC	Josh Downs 5-yard pass from Sam Howell (Grayson Atkins kick) (6 plays, 40 yards, 2:07)	UNC 52–10
4	08:13	GSU	Marcus Carroll 2-yard rush (Noel Ruiz kick) (9 plays, 75 yards, 3:09)	UNC 52–17
4	04:03	UNC	Bryson Nesbit 47-yard pass from Jacolby Criswell (Jonathan Kim kick) (7 plays, 75 yards, 4:10)	UNC 59–17

Statistics	Georgia State	North Carolina
First downs	16	28
Total yards	271	607
Rushing yards	181	201
Passing yards	90	406
Turnovers	1	1
Time of possession	30:17	29:43

Team	Category	Player	Statistics
Georgia State	Passing	Cornelious Brown IV	12/26, 68 yards, 1 INT
Georgia State	Rushing	Darren Grainger	5 carries, 56 yards
Georgia State	Receiving	Jamari Thrash	2 receptions, 18 yards
North Carolina	Passing	Sam Howell	21/29, 352 yards, 3 TDs
North Carolina	Rushing	Sam Howell	11 carries, 104 yards, 2 TDs
North Carolina	Receiving	Antoine Green	3 receptions, 117 yards, 1 TD

=== Charlotte ===
Charlotte at Georgia State

Team	1	2	3	4	Total
49ers	0	7	2	0	9
• Panthers	0	7	6	7	20

- Date: September 18, 2021
- Location: Center Parc Stadium
  Atlanta, GA
- Game start: 7:05 p.m. EDT
- Elapsed time: 3 hours and 12 minutes
- Game attendance: 12,978
- Game weather: 78 °F (26 °C) • Weather: Cloudy • Wind: SW 4 MPH
- Referee: Kevin Vicknair
- TV announcers (ESPN+): Matt Stewart (play–by–play) and Sam Crenshaw (analyst)

Scoring summary
2	07:41	CHAR	Elijah Spencer 36-yard pass from Chris Reynolds (Jonathan Cruz kick) (11 plays, 67 yards, 7:19)	CHAR 7–0
2	04:03	GSU	Jamari Thrash 35-yard pass from Darren Grainger (Noel Ruiz kick) (2 plays, 68 yards, 0:23)	TIE 7–7
3	09:45	CHAR	Team Safety (0 plays, 0 yards, 0:00)	CHAR 9–7
3	05:06	GSU	Ja'Cyais Credle 28-yard pass from Darren Grainger (Noel Ruiz PAT blocked) (6 plays, 66 yards, 2:18)	GSU 13–9
4	01:38	GSU	Jamyest Williams 13-yard rush (Noel Ruiz kick) (13 plays, 90 yards, 7:20)	GSU 20–9

Statistics	Charlotte	Georgia State
First downs	17	20
Total yards	276	437
Rushing yards	118	298
Passing yards	158	139
Turnovers	1	2
Time of possession	33:21	26:39

Team	Category	Player	Statistics
Charlotte	Passing	Chris Reynolds	13/28, 158 yards, 1 TD
Charlotte	Rushing	Calvin Camp	14 carries, 53 yards
Charlotte	Receiving	Grant DuBose	5 receptions, 45 yards
Georgia State	Passing	Darren Grainger	6/12, 139 yards, 2 TDs, 1 INT
Georgia State	Rushing	Destin Coates	4 carries, 83 yards
Georgia State	Receiving	Jamari Thrash	2 receptions, 62 yards, 1 TD

=== At Auburn ===
Georgia State at Auburn

Team	1	2	3	4	Total
Panthers	3	21	0	0	24
• No. 23 Tigers	6	6	7	15	34

- Date: September 25, 2021
- Location: Jordan–Hare Stadium
  Auburn, AL
- Game start: 4:01 p.m. EDT
- Elapsed time: 3 hours and 25 minutes
- Game attendance: 86,650
- Game weather: 79 °F (26 °C) • Weather: Sunny • Wind: NW 6 MPH
- Referee: Marc Curles
- TV announcers (SEC Network): Dave Neal (play–by–play), Deuce McAllister (analyst), Andraya Carter (sideline reporter)

Scoring summary
1	08:34	GSU	Noel Ruiz 32-yard field goal (6 plays, 58 yards, 2:40)	GSU 3–0
1	07:34	AUB	Anders Carlson 40-yard field goal (4 plays, 5 yards, 1:00)	TIE 3–3
1	02:57	AUB	Anders Carlson 23-yard field goal (10 plays, 65 yards, 3:49)	AUB 6–3
2	12:45	GSU	Jamari Thrash 12-yard pass from Darren Grainger (Noel Ruiz kick) (15 plays, 75 yards, 5:12)	GSU 10–6
2	09:00	AUB	Anders Carlson 27-yard field goal (9 plays, 66 yards, 3:45)	GSU 10–9
2	07:29	GSU	Roger Carter 7-yard pass from Darren Grainger (Noel Ruiz kick) (5 plays, 75 yards, 1:31)	GSU 17–9
2	02:54	AUB	Anders Carlson 45-yard field goal (11 plays, 47 yards, 4:35)	GSU 17–12
2	01:56	GSU	Tucker Gregg 50-yard rush (Noel Ruiz kick) (4 plays, 75 yards, 0:58)	GSU 24–12
3	04:44	AUB	Bartonm Lester 0-yard blocked punt returned (Anders Carlson kick) (3 plays, -6 yards, 1:51)	GSU 24–19
4	00:45	AUB	Shedrick Jackson 10-yard pass from T. J. Finley (T. J. Finley two-pass pass conversion to Kobe Hudson) (13 plays, 98 yards, 2:38)	AUB 27–24
4	00:31	AUB	Smoke Monday 36-yard interception returned (Anders Carlson kick) (2 plays, 0 yards, 0:14)	AUB 34–24

Statistics	Georgia State	Auburn
First downs	20	21
Total yards	384	419
Rushing yards	267	166
Passing yards	117	253
Turnovers	1	1
Time of possession	40:41	19:19

Team	Category	Player	Statistics
Georgia State	Passing	Darren Grainger	12/24, 117 yards, 2 TDs, 1 INT
Georgia State	Rushing	Tucker Gregg	12 carries, 150 yards, 1 TD
Georgia State	Receiving	Roger Carter	4 receptions, 51 yards, 1 TD
Auburn	Passing	Bo Nix	13/27, 156 yards
Auburn	Rushing	Jarquez Hunter	10 carries, 62 yards
Auburn	Receiving	Kobe Hudson	5 receptions, 76 yards

=== Appalachian State ===
Appalachian State at Georgia State

Team	1	2	3	4	Total
• RV Mountaineers	7	7	17	14	45
Panthers	0	6	3	7	16

- Date: October 2, 2021
- Location: Center Parc Stadium
  Atlanta, GA
- Game start: 2:04 pm EDT
- Elapsed time: 3 hours and 13 minutes
- Game attendance: 14,258
- Game weather: 79 °F (26 °C) • Weather: Cloudy • Wind: SE 3 MPH
- Referee: Trennis Livingston
- TV announcers (ESPN+): Matt Stewart (play–by–play) and Sam Crenshaw (analyst)

Scoring summary
1	12:20	APP	Nate Noel 23-yard rush (Chandler Staton kick) (8 plays, 59 yards, 2:30)	APP 7–0
2	13:14	GSU	Noel Ruiz 23-yard field goal (12 plays, 54 yards, 4:33)	APP 7–3
2	06:08	APP	Malik Williams 33-yard pass from Chase Brice (Chandler Staton kick) (12 plays, 87 yards, 4:27)	APP 14–3
2	01:55	GSU	Noel Ruiz 32-yard field goal (11 plays, 61 yards, 4:13)	APP 14–6
3	08:22	GSU	Noel Ruiz 22-yard field goal (11 plays, 84 yards, 4:06)	APP 14–9
3	08:05	APP	Corey Sutton 79-yard pass from Chase Brice (Chandler Staton kick) (1 play, 79 yards, 0:17)	APP 21–9
3	05:44	APP	Chandler Staton 48-yard field goal (5 plays, 17 yards, 1:13)	APP 24–9
3	00:00	APP	Miller Gibbs 5-yard pass from Jacob Huesman (Chandler Staton kick) (10 plays, 75 yards, 3:56)	APP 31–9
4	13:23	APP	Christian Wells 80-yard from Chase Brice (Chandler Staton kick) (1 play, 80 yards, 0:12)	APP 38–9
4	10:51	APP	Anderson Castle 22-yard rush (Chandler Staton kick) (3 plays, 34 yards, 1:20)	APP 45–9
4	03:44	GSU	Tailique Williams 66-yard pass from Darren Grainger (Noel Ruiz kick) (8 plays, 99 yards, 3:40)	APP 45–16

Statistics	Appalachian State	Georgia State
First downs	23	21
Total yards	502	381
Rushing yards	163	135
Passing yards	339	246
Turnovers	1	3
Time of possession	31:32	28:28

Team	Category	Player	Statistics
Appalachian State	Passing	Chase Brice	20/28, 326 yards, 3 TDs
Appalachian State	Rushing	Nate Noel	12 carries, 74 yards, 1 TD
Appalachian State	Receiving	Corey Sutton	4 receptions, 106 yards, 1 TD
Georgia State	Passing	Cornelious Brown IV	16/31, 171 yards, 2 INTs
Georgia State	Rushing	Marcus Carroll	9 carries, 46 yards
Georgia State	Receiving	Tailique Williams	1 reception, 66 yards, 1 TD

=== At Louisiana–Monroe ===
Georgia State at Louisiana–Monroe

Team	1	2	3	4	Total
• Panthers	7	21	14	13	55
Warhawks	7	0	7	7	21

- Date: October 9, 2021
- Location: Malone Stadium
  Monroe, LA
- Game start: 8:05 p.m. EDT
- Elapsed time: 3 hours and 29 minutes
- Game attendance: 9,913
- Game weather: 81 °F (27 °C) • Weather: Sunny • Wind: S 8 MPH
- Referee: Kyle Olson
- TV announcers (ESPN3): Mike Hammett (play–by–play) and David Griffith (analyst)

Scoring summary
1	09:35	ULM	Zach Rasmussen 26-yard pass from Chandler Rogers (Calum Sutherland kick) (6 plays, 97 yards, 1:44)	ULM 7–0
1	06:35	GSU	Jamyest Williams 1-yard rush (Noel Ruiz kick) (10 plays, 75 yards, 3:00)	TIE 7–7
2	13:38	GSU	Aubry Payne 10-yard pass from Darren Grainger (Noel Ruiz kick) (7 plays, 74 yards, 2:19)	GSU 14–7
2	04:23	GSU	Ja'Cyais Credle 31-yard pass from Darren Grainger (Noel Ruiz kick) (14 plays, 76 yards, 5:12)	GSU 21–7
2	01:33	GSU	Tucker Gregg 2-yard rush (Noel Ruiz kick) (7 plays, 34 yards, 2:25)	GSU 28–7
3	11:53	GSU	Aubry Payne 9-yard pass from Darren Grainger (Noel Ruiz kick) (8 plays, 75 yards, 3:07)	GSU 35–7
3	09:10	ULM	Zach Johnson 18-yard pass from Chandler Rogers (Calum Sutherland kick) (7 plays, 75 yards, 2:38)	GSU 35–14
3	04:31	GSU	Darren Grainger 1-yard rush (Noel Ruiz kick) (10 plays, 70 yards, 4:39)	GSU 42–14
4	14:52	GSU	Ja'Cyais Credle 38-yard pass from Darren Grainger (Noel Ruiz kick) (6 plays, 80 yards, 2:22)	GSU 48–14
4	11:48	GSU	Cornelious Brown IV 26-yard rush (Noel Ruiz PAT failed) (5 plays, 55 yards, 2:12)	GSU 55–14
4	04:34	ULM	Coby Cavil 6-yard pass from Jiya Wright (Calum Sutherland kick) (12 plays, 70 yards, 4:51)	GSU 55–21

Statistics	Georgia State	Louisiana–Monroe
First downs	39	21
Total yards	572	359
Rushing yards	326	122
Passing yards	246	237
Turnovers	0	2
Time of possession	35:08	24:52

Team	Category	Player	Statistics
Georgia State	Passing	Darren Grainger	18/25, 230 yards, 4 TDs
Georgia State	Rushing	Darren Grainger	12 carries, 84 yards, 1 TD
Georgia State	Receiving	Ja'Cyais Credle	7 receptions, 130 yards, 2 TDs
Louisiana–Monroe	Passing	Chandler Rogers	15/23, 208 yards, 2 TDs
Louisiana–Monroe	Rushing	Chandler Rogers	14 carries, 72 yards
Louisiana–Monroe	Receiving	Boogie Knight	5 receptions, 78 yards

=== Texas State ===
Texas State at Georgia State

Team	1	2	3	4	Total
Bobcats	6	7	3	0	16
• Panthers	7	7	7	7	28

- Date: October 23, 2021
- Location: Center Parc Stadium
  Atlanta, GA
- Game start: 2:04 p.m. EDT
- Elapsed time: 3 hours and 40 minutes
- Game attendance: 16,779
- Game weather: 72 °F (22 °C) • Weather: Sunny • Wind: NW 2 MPH
- Referee: Marshall Lewis
- TV announcers (ESPN+): Matt Stewart (play–by–play) and Sam Crenshaw (analyst)

Scoring summary
1	11:02	TXST	Seth Keller 42-yard field goal (12 plays, 39 yards, 3:58)	TXST 3–0
1	07:02	TXST	Seth Keller 42-yard field goal (10 plays, 50 yards, 3:06)	TXST 6–0
1	00:54	GSU	Jamyest Williams 18-yard rush (Noel Ruiz kick) (7 plays, 99 yards, 2:30)	GSU 7–6
2	14:30	GSU	Jamari Thrash 35-yard pass from Darren Grainger (Noel Ruiz kick) (3 plays, 53 yards, 0:31)	GSU 14–6
2	09:46	TXST	Brady McBride 8-yard rush (Seth Keller kick) (12 plays, 68 yards, 4:44)	GSU 14–13
3	08:10	GSU	Jamyest Williams 28-yard rush (Noel Ruiz kick) (7 plays, 67 yards, 2:24)	GSU 21–13
3	03:57	TXST	Seth Keller 31-yard field goal (11 plays, 66 yards, 4:13)	GSU 21–16
3	14:54	GSU	Aubry Payne 27-yard pass from Darren Grainger (Noel Ruiz kick) (11 plays, 75 yards, 4:03)	GSU 28–16

Statistics	Texas State	Georgia State
First downs	26	26
Total yards	378	483
Rushing yards	123	283
Passing yards	255	200
Turnovers	2	1
Time of possession	32:23	27:37

Team	Category	Player	Statistics
Texas State	Passing	Brady McBride	27/47, 255 yards, 1 INT
Texas State	Rushing	Brady McBride	17 carries, 46 yards, 1 TD
Texas State	Receiving	Ashtyn Hawkins	6 receptions, 108 yards
Georgia State	Passing	Darren Grainger	16/25, 200 yards, 2 TDs
Georgia State	Rushing	Tucker Gregg	21 carries, 115 yards
Georgia State	Receiving	Jamari Thrash	4 receptions, 74 yards, 1 TD

=== At Georgia Southern ===
Georgia State at Georgia Southern

Team	1	2	3	4	Total
• Panthers	0	0	7	14	21
Eagles	0	7	0	7	14

- Date: October 30, 2021
- Location: Paulson Stadium
  Statesboro, GA
- Game start: 6:05 p.m. EDT
- Elapsed time: 3 hours and 7 minutes
- Game attendance: 17,843
- Game weather: Sunny
- Referee: Wayne Winkler
- TV announcers (ESPN+): Matt Stewart (play–by–play) and Danny Waugh (analyst)

Scoring summary
2	05:23	GASO	Beau Johnson 17-yard pass from Justin Tomlin (Alex Raynor kick) (9 plays, 92 yards, 4:44)	GASO 7–0
3	08:06	GSU	Tucker Gregg 2-yard rush (Noel Ruiz kick) (9 plays, 69 yards, 3:02)	TIE 7–7
4	11:19	GSU	Tucker Gregg 3-yard rush (Noel Ruiz kick) (8 plays, 83 yards, 3:05)	GSU 14–7
4	01:39	GASO	Logan Wright 9-yard rush (Alex Raynor kick) (5 plays, 42 yards, 1:25)	TIE 14–14
4	00:26	GSU	Jaymest Williams 23-yard rush (Noel Ruiz kick) (7 plays, 73 yards, 1:06)	GSU 21–14

Statistics	Georgia State	Georgia Southern
First downs	22	24
Total yards	378	486
Rushing yards	237	207
Passing yards	141	279
Turnovers	0	2
Time of possession	25:07	34:53

Team	Category	Player	Statistics
Georgia State	Passing	Darren Grainger	16/27, 141 yards
Georgia State	Rushing	Jaymest Williams	12 carries, 97 yards, 1 TD
Georgia State	Receiving	Roger Carter	2 receptions, 59 yards
Georgia Southern	Passing	Justin Tomlin	18/27, 279 yards, 1 TD, 2 INTs
Georgia Southern	Rushing	Logan Wright	20 carries, 113 yards, 1 TD
Georgia Southern	Receiving	Khaleb Hood	6 receptions, 107 yards

=== At Louisiana ===
Georgia State at Louisiana

Team	1	2	3	4	Total
Panthers	3	0	7	7	17
• Ragin' Cajuns	0	0	7	14	21

- Date: November 4, 2021
- Location: Cajun Field
  Lafayette, LA
- Game start: 7:36 p.m. EDT
- Elapsed time: 3 hours and 7 minutes
- Game attendance: 16,007
- Game weather: 54 °F (12 °C) • Weather: Cloudy • Wind: N 11 MPH
- Referee: Marshall Lewis
- TV announcers (ESPN): Matt Barrie (play–by–play), Roddy Jones (analyst) and Alex Chappell (sideline reporter)

Scoring summary
1	05:05	GSU	Noel Ruiz 39-yard field goal (12 plays, 71 yards, 5:15)	GSU 3–0
3	08:46	GSU	Roger Carter 37-yard pass from Darren Grainger (Noel Ruiz kick) (3 plays, 52 yards, 0:54)	GSU 10–0
3	02:49	LA	Peter LeBlanc 13-yard pass from Levi Lewis (Nate Snyder kick) (12 plays, 75 yards, 5:57)	GSU 10–7
4	13:11	LA	Montrell Johnson 3-yard rush (Nate Snyder kick) (6 plays, 51 yards, 2:24)	LA 14–10
4	05:25	GSU	Tucker Gregg 1-yard rush (Noel Ruiz kick) (16 plays, 76 yards, 7:46)	GSU 17–14
4	02:32	LA	Montrell Johnson 13-yard rush (Nate Snyder kick) (8 plays, 71 yards, 2:53)	LA 21–17

Statistics	Georgia State	Louisiana
First downs	20	21
Total yards	307	430
Rushing yards	209	143
Passing yards	98	287
Turnovers	0	1
Time of possession	28:46	31:14

Team	Category	Player	Statistics
Georgia State	Passing	Darren Grainger	8/19, 98 yards, 1 TD
Georgia State	Rushing	Tucker Gregg	23 carries, 99 yards, 1 TD
Georgia State	Receiving	Roger Carter	3 receptions, 76 yards, 1 TD
Louisiana	Passing	Levi Lewis	19/34, 287 yards, 1 TD, 1 INT
Louisiana	Rushing	Montrell Johnson	17 carries, 98 yards, 2 TDs
Louisiana	Receiving	Peter LeBlanc	9 receptions, 118 yards, 1 TD

=== At Coastal Carolina ===
Georgia State at Coastal Carolina

Team	1	2	3	4	Total
• Panthers	14	14	0	14	42
Chanticleers	14	9	3	14	40

- Date: November 13, 2021
- Location: Brooks Stadium
  Conway, SC
- Game start: 2:05 p.m. EST
- Elapsed time: 3 hours and 26 minutes
- Game attendance: 16,744
- Game weather: 70 °F (21 °C) • Weather: Sunny • Wind: SW 8 MPH
- Referee: Matt Loeffler
- TV announcers (ESPN+): Jeff McCarragher (play–by–play) and Nate Ross (analyst)

Scoring summary
1	12:55	CCU	Shermari Jones 1-yard rush (Massimo Biscardi kick) (6 plays, 77 yards, 2:29)	CCU 7–0
1	03:40	GSU	Tucker Gregg 2-yard rush (Noel Ruiz kick) (11 plays, 75 yards, 4:12)	TIE 7–7
1	03:25	CCU	Braydon Bennett 75-yard rush (Massimo Biscardi kick) (1 play, 75 yards, 0:15)	CCU 14–7
1	01:19	GSU	Aubry Payne 3-yard pass from Darren Grainger (Noel Ruiz kick) (8 plays, 75 yards, 2:06)	TIE 14–14
2	14:57	GSU	Tucker Gregg 1-yard rush (Noel Ruiz kick) (2 plays, 1 yard, 0:37)	GSU 21–14
2	09:38	CCU	Team Safety (2 plays, -2 yards, 0:35)	GSU 21–16
2	05:02	GSU	Jamyest Williams 36-yard rush (Noel Ruiz kick) (8 plays, 75 yards, 3:03)	GSU 28–16
2	00:45	CCU	Shermari Jones 8-yard rush (Massimo Biscardi kick) (10 plays, 75 yards, 4:17)	GSU 28–23
3	04:42	CCU	Massimo Biscardi 24-yard field goal (15 plays, 44 yards, 8:52)	GSU 28–26
4	09:15	CCU	Shermari Jones 8-yard rush (Greg Latushko two-point conversion pass to Bryce Carpenter) (9 plays, 64 yards, 4:26)	CCU 34–28
4	04:53	GSU	Terrance Dixon 2-yard pass from Darren Grainger (Noel Ruiz kick) (11 plays, 75 yards, 4:22)	GSU 35–34
4	02:36	GSU	Tucker Gregg 4-yard rush (Noel Ruiz kick) (2 plays, 8 yards, 0:11)	GSU 42–34
4	01:09	CCU	Isaiah Likely 17-yard pass from Bryce Carpenter (two-point conversion rush failed) (8 plays, 75 yards, 1:27)	GSU 42–40

Statistics	Georgia State	Coastal Carolina
First downs	18	26
Total yards	373	442
Rushing yards	175	209
Passing yards	198	233
Turnovers	0	2
Time of possession	25:11	34:49

Team	Category	Player	Statistics
Georgia State	Passing	Darren Grainger	18/24, 198 yards, 2 TDs
Georgia State	Rushing	Jamyest Williams	11 carries, 82 yards, 1 TD
Georgia State	Receiving	Roger Carter	3 receptions, 70 yards
Coastal Carolina	Passing	Bryce Carpenter	17/29, 233 yards, 1 TD, 1 INT
Coastal Carolina	Rushing	Braydon Bennett	10 carries, 128 yards, 1 TD
Coastal Carolina	Receiving	Isaiah Likely	7 receptions, 101 yards, 1 TD

=== Arkansas State ===
Arkansas State at Georgia State

Team	1	2	3	4	Total
Red Wolves	3	10	0	7	20
• Panthers	7	7	0	14	28

- Date: November 20, 2021
- Location: Center Parc Stadium
  Atlanta, GA
- Game start: 2:05 p.m. EST
- Elapsed time: 3 hours and 15 minutes
- Game attendance: 14,273
- Game weather: 57 °F (14 °C) • Weather: Sunny • Wind: E 7 MPH
- Referee: Kyle Olson
- TV announcers (ESPN3): Matt Stewart (play–by–play) and Sam Crenshaw (analyst)

Scoring summary
1	11:27	ARST	Blake Grupe 40-yard field goal (8 plays, 23 yards, 2:43)	ARST 3–0
1	01:36	GSU	Jaymest Williams 1-yard rush (Noel Ruiz kick) (11 plays, 85 yards, 4:11)	GSU 7–3
2	10:49	GSU	Tucker Gregg 6-yard rush (Noel Ruiz kick) (11 plays, 74 yards, 4:03)	GSU 14–3
2	09:44	ARST	Lincoln Pare 83-yard pass from Layne Hatcher (Blake Grupe kick) (3 plays, 77 yards, 1:05)	GSU 14–10
2	00:00	ARST	Blake Grupe 36-yard field goal (14 plays, 48 yards, 4:34)	GSU 14–13
4	14:56	GSU	Jaymest Williams 13-yard rush (Noel Ruiz kick) (4 plays, 68 yards, 1:13)	GSU 21–13
4	12:24	GSU	Darren Grainger 35-yard rush (Noel Ruiz kick) (3 plays, 50 yards, 0:45)	GSU 28–13
4	04:22	ARST	Kivon Bennett 80-yard fumble returned (Blake Grupe kick) (0 plays, 0 yards, 0:00)	GSU 28–20

Statistics	Arkansas State	Georgia State
First downs	16	21
Total yards	270	434
Rushing yards	-3	282
Passing yards	273	152
Turnovers	2	3
Time of possession	30:52	29:08

Team	Category	Player	Statistics
Arkansas State	Passing	Layne Hatcher	28/48, 273 yards, 1 TD, 2 INTs
Arkansas State	Rushing	Lincoln Pare	13 carries, 33 yards
Arkansas State	Receiving	Lincoln Pare	6 receptions, 118 yards, 1 TD
Georgia State	Passing	Darren Grainger	10/21, 152 yards, 1 INT
Georgia State	Rushing	Jaymest Williams	16 carries, 125 yards, 2 TDs
Georgia State	Receiving	Jamari Thrash	4 receptions, 103 yards

=== Troy ===
Troy at Georgia State

Team	1	2	3	4	Total
Trojans	0	3	0	7	10
• Panthers	7	10	13	7	37

- Date: November 27, 2021
- Location: Center Parc Stadium
  Atlanta, GA
- Game start: 2:04 p.m. EST
- Elapsed time: 3 hours and 1 minute
- Game attendance: 13,875
- Game weather: 58 °F (14 °C) • Weather: Sunny • Wind: W 6 MPH
- Referee: Trennis Livingston
- TV announcers (ESPN+): Matt Stewart (play–by–play) and Sam Crenshaw (analyst)

Scoring summary
1	07:52	GSU	Aubry Payne 13-yard pass from Darren Grainger (Noel Ruiz kick) (6 plays, 60 yards, 2:11)	GSU 7–0
2	11:18	GSU	Sam Pinckney 36-yard pass from Darren Grainger (Noel Ruiz kick) (10 plays, 74 yards, 3:56)	GSU 14–0
2	02:46	GSU	Noel Ruiz 43-yard field goal (9 plays, 39 yards, 2:37)	GSU 17–0
2	00:34	TROY	Brooks Buce 48-yard field goal (8 plays, 44 yards, 2:12)	GSU 17–3
3	11:30	GSU	Noel Ruiz 45-yard field goal (10 plays, 49 yards, 3:30)	GSU 20–3
3	07:40	GSU	Jamil Muhammad 72-yard fumble returned (Noel Ruiz kick) (9 plays, 47 yards, 3:50)	GSU 27–3
3	01:30	GSU	Noel Ruiz 50-yard field goal (9 plays, 39 yards, 3:07)	GSU 30–3
4	13:15	GSU	Jamyest Williams 50-yard rush (Noel Ruiz kick) (3 plays, 57 yards, 1:25)	GSU 37–3
4	07:06	TROY	B. J. Smith 2-yard rush (Brooks Buce kick) (11 plays, 75 yards, 6:09)	GSU 37–10

Statistics	Troy	Georgia State
First downs	18	21
Total yards	344	387
Rushing yards	57	247
Passing yards	287	140
Turnovers	4	2
Time of possession	32:56	27:04

Team	Category	Player	Statistics
Troy	Passing	Gunnar Watson	21/38, 287 yards, 2 INTs
Troy	Rushing	B. J. Smith	13 carries, 35 yards, 1 TD
Troy	Receiving	Deshon Stoudemire	4 receptions, 80 yards
Georgia State	Passing	Darren Grainger	11/22, 140 yards, 2 TDs
Georgia State	Rushing	Jaymest Williams	15 carries, 108 yards, 1 TD
Georgia State	Receiving	Sam Pinckney	3 receptions, 51 yards, 1 TD

=== Vs. Ball State (Camellia Bowl) ===
Georgia State vs. Ball State

Team	1	2	3	4	Total
• Panthers	14	6	28	3	51
Cardinals	7	6	0	7	20

- Date: December 25, 2021
- Location: Cramton Bowl
  Montgomery, AL
- Game start: 2:30 p.m. EST
- Elapsed time:
- Game attendance: 7,345
- Game weather: 75 °F (24 °C) • Weather: Partly cloudy • Wind: SW 13 MPH
- Referee: Kevin Vicknair
- TV announcers (ESPN): Roy Philpott (play-by-play), Hutson Mason (analyst), and Abby Labar (sideline)

Scoring summary
1	8:59	BALL	Jayshon Jackson 56-yard reception from Drew Plitt (Jake Chanove kick) (2 plays, 61 yards, 0:38)	BALL 7–0
1	4:55	GSU	Aubry Payne 18-yard reception from Darren Grainger (Noel Ruiz kick) (10 plays, 75 yards, 4:04)	TIED 7–7
1	2:02	GSU	Javon Denis 37-yard fumble recovery (Noel Ruiz kick)	GSU 14–7
2	14:11	GSU	Noel Ruiz 27-yard field goal (7 plays, 24 yards, 1:48)	GSU 17–7
2	9:20	BALL	Jacob Lewis 34-yard field goal (7 plays, 30 yards, 2:06)	GSU 17–10
2	6:01	GSU	Noel Ruiz 28-yard field goal (8 plays, 65 yards, 3:19)	GSU 20–10
2	0:18	BALL	Jacob Lewis 43-yard field goal (13 plays, 53 yards, 5:43)	GSU 20–13
3	12:05	GSU	Robert Lewis 10-yard reception from Darren Grainger (Noel Ruiz kick) (8 plays, 75 yards, 2:55)	GSU 27–13
3	7:08	GSU	Darren Grainger 34-yard run (Noel Ruiz kick) (7 plays, 68 yards, 3:29)	GSU 34–13
3	1:33	GSU	Aubry Payne 16-yard reception from Darren Grainger (Noel Ruiz kick) (5 plays, 71 yards, 1:37)	GSU 41–13
3	0:00	GSU	Antavious Lane 55-yard interception (Noel Ruiz kick)	GSU 48–13
4	9:03	GSU	Noel Ruiz 45-yard field goal (8 plays, 38 yards, 3:27)	GSU 51–13
4	3:13	BALL	Drew Plitt 1-yard run (Jake Chanove kick) (15 plays, 75 yards, 5:50)	GSU 51–20

Statistics	Ball State	Georgia State
First downs	21	22
Total yards	464	367
Rushing yards	259	74
Passing yards	205	293
Turnovers	0	2
Time of possession	26:46	33:14

Team	Category	Player	Statistics
Ball State	Passing	Drew Plitt	27/46, 293 yards, 1 TD, 1 INT
Ball State	Rushing	Carson Steele	15 carries, 62 yards
Ball State	Receiving	Jayshon Jackson	12 receptions, 146 yards, 1 TD
Georgia State	Passing	Darren Grainger	15/19, 203 yards, 3 TDs
Georgia State	Rushing	Darren Grainger	11 carries, 122 yards, 1 TD
Georgia State	Receiving	Aubry Payne	8 receptions, 109 yards, 2 TDs
