= Darren Grainger =

American gridiron football player (born 2000)

Profile
- Position: Quarterback

Personal information
- Born: July 21, 2000 (age 26); Conway, South Carolina, U.S.
- Listed height: 6 ft 4 in (1.93 m)
- Listed weight: 225 lb (102 kg)

Career information
- High school: Conway (Conway, South Carolina)
- College: Furman (2018–2019); Georgia State (2021–2023)
- NFL draft: 2024: undrafted

Career history
- Winnipeg Blue Bombers (2024)*
- * Offseason or practice squad member only

Awards and highlights
- Camellia Bowl MVP (2021); Famous Idaho Potato Bowl MVP (2023)
- Stats at CFL.ca

Darren D'Waun Grainger (born July 21, 2000) is an American former football quarterback. He played college football for the Furman Paladins and the Georgia State Panthers.

== Early life ==
Grainger attended Conway High School in Conway, South Carolina, where he lettered in football and basketball. He was an unranked quarterback recruit and committed to play at Furman.

== College career ==
=== Furman ===
As a freshman in 2018, Grainger played in four games and started one. He completed 13 of 27 passing attempts for 181 yards, two interceptions and two touchdowns and was given a redshirt. In 2019, Grainger played in all 13 games and completed 79 of 161 passing attempts for 1,222 yards, 13 touchdowns, and three interceptions.

On December 23, 2020, Grainger announced that he would be transferring to Georgia State.

=== Georgia State ===
In 2021, Grainger played all 13 games and completed 136 of 228 passing attempts for 1,715 yards, 19 touchdowns, and four interceptions. He was named the Sun Belt Conference Offensive Player of the Week after he completed 18 of 24 passing attempts for 198 yards and two touchdowns against Coastal Carolina. In the 2021 Camellia Bowl, Grainger passed for 203 yards and three touchdowns and ran for 122 yards and won game MVP honors. In 2022, he played in 11 games and completed 158 of 272 passing attempts for 2,257 yards, 16 touchdowns, and six interceptions, earning all Sun-Belt honorable mention.

In 2023, Grainger was named the Sun Belt Offensive Player of the Week after completing 27 of 33 passing attempts for 466 yards and three touchdowns, while also rushing for 23 yards and a touchdown against Charlotte.

=== Statistics ===
Season	Team	Games			Passing								Rushing			
Season	Team	GP	GS	Record	Cmp	Att	Pct	Yds	Y/A	TD	Int	Rtg	Att	Yds	Avg	TD
2018	Furman	4	1	0–1	13	27	48.1	181	6.7	2	2	114.1	42	37	0.9	0
2019	Furman	13	11	7–4	79	161	49.1	1,222	7.6	13	3	135.7	93	316	3.4	5
2021	Georgia State	13	11	8–3	136	228	59.6	1,715	7.5	19	4	146.8	133	660	5.0	3
2022	Georgia State	12	12	4–8	174	297	58.6	2,443	8.2	18	7	143.0	164	734	4.5	6
2023	Georgia State	13	13	7–6	244	358	68.2	2,621	7.3	20	7	144.2	159	736	4.6	10
FCS Totals		17	12	7–5	92	188	48.9	1,403	7.5	15	5	132.6	135	353	2.6	5
FBS Totals		38	36	19–17	554	883	62.7	6,779	7.7	57	18	144.5	456	2,130	4.7	19
Career		55	48	26–22	646	1,071	60.3	8,182	7.6	72	23	142.4	591	2,483	4.2	24

== Professional career ==
Pre-draft measurables
Height	Weight	Arm length	Hand span	40-yard dash	10-yard split	20-yard split	20-yard shuttle	Three-cone drill	Vertical jump	Broad jump
6 ft 3 1/8 in (1.91 m)	209 lb (95 kg)	33 3/8 in (0.85 m)	10 in (0.25 m)	4.84 s	1.66 s	2.81 s	4.47 s	7.62 s	30.0 in (0.76 m)	9 ft 3 in (2.82 m)
All values from Pro Day

On May 25, 2024, Grainger signed to play for the Winnipeg Blue Bombers of the Canadian Football League (CFL). He was released on June 2, 2024. Late in the season, he was re-signed by the Blue Bombers on September 16, 2024, to a practice roster agreement. He retired on January 27, 2025.
