= 2021 Arkansas State Red Wolves football team =

American college football season

2021 Arkansas State Red Wolves football
- Conference: Sun Belt Conference
- West Division
- Record: 2–10 (1–7 Sun Belt)
- Head coach: Butch Jones (1st season)
- Offensive coordinator: Keith Heckendorf (3rd season)
- Offensive scheme: Multiple
- Defensive coordinator: Rob Harley (1st season)
- Base defense: 4–3
- Home stadium: Centennial Bank Stadium

2021 Sun Belt Conference football standings
	Conf.			Overall
Team	W		L	W		L
East Division
Appalachian State xy	7	–	1	10	–	4
Georgia State	6	–	2	8	–	5
Coastal Carolina	6	–	2	11	–	2
Troy	3	–	5	5	–	7
Georgia Southern	2	–	6	3	–	9
West Division
No. 16 Louisiana xy$	8	–	0	13	–	1
Texas State	3	–	5	4	–	8
Louisiana–Monroe	2	–	6	4	–	8
South Alabama	2	–	6	5	–	7
Arkansas State	1	–	7	2	–	10
Championship: Louisiana 24, Appalachian State 16
$ – Conference champion; x – Division champion/co-champions; y – Championship game participant; Rankings from AP Poll

The 2021 Arkansas State Red Wolves football team represented Arkansas State University in the 2021 NCAA Division I FBS football season. The Red Wolves played their home games at Centennial Bank Stadium in Jonesboro, Arkansas, and competed in the West Division of the Sun Belt Conference.

Prior to the season, Arkansas State hired Butch Jones as head coach after Blake Anderson departed for Utah State. The team announced Rob Harley as their new defensive coordinator shortly after Jones' arrival.

== Preseason ==
=== Recruiting class ===
College recruiting
Name	Hometown	School	Height	Weight	40^{‡}	Commit date
Wyatt Begeal; QB	Cibolo, TX	Steele HS	6 ft 0 in (1.83 m)	189 lb (86 kg)	–	Dec 16, 2020
Wyatt Begeal; QB	Recruit ratings: Scout: Rivals: 247Sports: ESPN:					
Dennard Flowers; DE	Fairburn, GA	Creekside HS	6 ft 4 in (1.93 m)	210 lb (95 kg)	–	Feb 3, 2021
Dennard Flowers; DE	Recruit ratings: Scout: Rivals: 247Sports: ESPN:					
Thurman Geathers; DE	Acworth, GA	North Cobb HS; Louisville	6 ft 3 in (1.91 m)	230 lb (100 kg)	–	Dec 16, 2020
Thurman Geathers; DE	Recruit ratings: Scout: Rivals: 247Sports: ESPN:					
Ethan Hassler; LB	Collierville, TN	Collierville HS	6 ft 3 in (1.91 m)	220 lb (100 kg)	–	Dec 16, 2020
Ethan Hassler; LB	Recruit ratings: Scout: Rivals: 247Sports: ESPN:					
Te'Vailance Hunt; WR	Texarkana, TX	Texas HS; TCU	6 ft 3 in (1.91 m)	200 lb (91 kg)	–	Dec 16, 2020
Te'Vailance Hunt; WR	Recruit ratings: Scout: Rivals: 247Sports: ESPN:					
Cam Jeffery; S	Tuscaloosa, AL	American Christian	6 ft 0 in (1.83 m)	195 lb (88 kg)	–	Dec 16, 2020
Cam Jeffery; S	Recruit ratings: Scout: Rivals: 247Sports: ESPN:					
Leon Jones; CB	Hattiesburg, MS	North Forrest HS; Mississippi Gulf Coast CC	6 ft 2 in (1.88 m)	180 lb (82 kg)	–	Dec 16, 2020
Leon Jones; CB	Recruit ratings: Scout: Rivals: 247Sports: ESPN:					
Alan Lamar; RB	Olive Branch, MS	DeSoto Central HS; Yale	5 ft 9 in (1.75 m)	202 lb (92 kg)	–	Dec 16, 2020
Alan Lamar; RB	Recruit ratings: Scout: Rivals: 247Sports: ESPN:					
Bobby Mcmillian; RB	Vero Beach, FL	Vero Beach HS	5 ft 10 in (1.78 m)	190 lb (86 kg)	–	Dec 16, 2020
Bobby Mcmillian; RB	Recruit ratings: Scout: Rivals: 247Sports: ESPN:					
Jalil Muhammed; DL	Fairburn, GA	Creekside HS	6 ft 3 in (1.91 m)	285 lb (129 kg)	–	Feb 3, 2021
Jalil Muhammed; DL	Recruit ratings: Scout: Rivals: 247Sports: ESPN:					
Joe Ozougwu; DE	Alief, TX	Taylor HS; North Texas	6 ft 3 in (1.91 m)	238 lb (108 kg)	–	Dec 16, 2020
Joe Ozougwu; DE	Recruit ratings: Scout: Rivals: 247Sports: ESPN:					
Justin Parks; S	Gardendale, AL	Gardendale HS	6 ft 1 in (1.85 m)	180 lb (82 kg)	–	Dec 16, 2020
Justin Parks; S	Recruit ratings: Scout: Rivals: 247Sports: ESPN:					
Tristan Shorter; LB	Oxford, MS	Oxford HS	6 ft 0 in (1.83 m)	190 lb (86 kg)	–	Dec 16, 2020
Tristan Shorter; LB	Recruit ratings: Scout: Rivals: 247Sports: ESPN:					
Nason Simmons; OL	Canton, GA	Cherokee HS	6 ft 7 in (2.01 m)	280 lb (130 kg)	–	Dec 16, 2020
Nason Simmons; OL	Recruit ratings: Scout: Rivals: 247Sports: ESPN:					
Emmanual Stevenson; TE	Eufaula, AL	Eufaula HS	6 ft 3 in (1.91 m)	220 lb (100 kg)	–	Feb 3, 2021
Emmanual Stevenson; TE	Recruit ratings: Scout: Rivals: 247Sports: ESPN:					
Makilan Thomas; OL	Little Rock, AR	Central HS	6 ft 3 in (1.91 m)	295 lb (134 kg)	–	Dec 16, 2020
Makilan Thomas; OL	Recruit ratings: Scout: Rivals: 247Sports: ESPN:					
Seydou Traore; TE	London, England	Clearwater Academy	6 ft 4 in (1.93 m)	210 lb (95 kg)	–	Feb 3, 2021
Seydou Traore; TE	Recruit ratings: Scout: Rivals: 247Sports: ESPN:					
Khyheen Waleed; WR	Queen Creek, AZ	Casteel HS; Boise State	6 ft 0 in (1.83 m)	199 lb (90 kg)	–	Dec 16, 2020
Khyheen Waleed; WR	Recruit ratings: Scout: Rivals: 247Sports: ESPN:					
Omari Walker; WR	McKinney, TX	McKinney HS	5 ft 9 in (1.75 m)	175 lb (79 kg)	–	Dec 16, 2020
Omari Walker; WR	Recruit ratings: Scout: Rivals: 247Sports: ESPN:					

=== Award watch lists ===
Listed in the order that they were released

==== Preseason ====
Award	Player	Position	Year
Maxwell Award	Layne Hatcher	QB	RS-SO
Doak Walker Award	Marcel Murray	RB	JR
Ray Guy Award	Ryan Hanson	P	RS-FR

=== Sun Belt coaches poll ===
The Sun Belt coaches poll was released on July 20, 2021. The Red Wolves were picked to finish second in the West Division and fourth overall in the conference.

== Personnel ==
2021 Arkansas State Red Wolves football team roster
Players
Coaches
Offense

Pos.	#	Name	Class
WR	0	Javan Hawes	Sr
QB	3	Layne Hatcher	Jr
WR	4	Dahu Green	Sr
WR	5	David Clayton	So
QB	6	Wyatt Begeal	Fr
WR	7	Corey Rucker	So
WR	10	Te'Vailance Hunt	Jr
WR	11	Adam Jones	So
WR	13	Jeff Foreman	Jr
WR	15	Seth Hayes	So
WR	16	Khyheem Waleed	So
WR	17	Leroy Deshazor	Sr
TE	18	Seydou Traore	Fr
TE	19	Coltin Clack	So
RB	21	Alan Lamar	Sr
RB	22	Lincoln Pare	So
RB	23	Isaiah Azubuike	Jr
RB	34	Marcel Murray	Sr
RB	36	Anthony Price	Fr
RB	39	Josh Edwards	So
OL	50	Austin Woods	So
OL	54	Christian Hoz	Jr
OL	60	Wyatt Luebke	Sr
OL	63	Thomas Vaughan	So
OL	64	Jacob Still	Sr
OL	65	Noah Smith	Fr
OL	67	Ethan Miner	So
OL	68	Avery Demmons	Sr
OL	70	Ivory Scott	Sr
OL	71	Kideam Diouf	Sr
OL	72	Nour-Eddine Seidnaly	Sr
OL	73	Ernesto Ramirez	Sr
OL	74	Andre Harris Jr.	Sr
OL	76	Kyle Kelly	So
OL	78	Justin Dutton	Sr
TE	80	Ross Painter	Sr
WR	82	Antonio Ruiz	So
TE	87	Reed Tyler	Sr
WR	88	Austin Smith	So
WR	89	Jackson Jarvis	Jr
RB		Bobby Mcmillian	Fr
TE		Emmanual Stevenson	Fr
OL		Makilan Thomas	Fr
WR		Omari Walker	Fr

Defense

Pos.	#	Name	Class
CB	1	Samy Johnson	Jr
CB	2	Leon Jones	Jr
S	3	Antwon Fegans	So
S	5	Amir Howard	Sr
S	6	Jarius Reimonenq	Jr
S	7	Anthony Switzer	Jr
CB	8	Kenneth Harris	So
S	9	Trevian Thomas	So
S	10	Elery Alexander	Sr
LB	11	Jaden Harris	Jr
LB	12	CJ Harris	So
LB	13	Vershaud Richardson	So
S	14	Antonio Fletcher	Sr
CB	15	Booker Ficklin	Sr
DE	17	Sosaia Tuitavake	Sr
S	20	Detravion Green	Jr
LB	22	Caleb Bonner	Sr
LB	23	Dane Motley	So
LB	24	Fred Harvey	Sr
LB	26	Tristan Shorter	Fr
S	27	Karon Coleman	So
LB	28	Jeffmario Brown	Sr
S	29	Justin Parks	Fr
LB	30	Derrick Bean	Sr
LB	31	Carvin Duverge	Sr
LB	32	Ahmad Adams	So
CB	37	Taylon Doss	So
DL	42	Vidal Scott	Sr
LB	44	Israel Whitmore	So
DE	45	TW Ayers	Jr
DL	51	Elija Veasey	Jr
DB	52	Corbet Mims	So
LB	55	Gentry Miller	Fr
DE	58	Dequan Ball	So
DE	90	Arian Strong	Jr
DL	91	JB Brown	So
DE	92	Thurman Geathers	Jr
DE	93	Joe Ozougwa	Sr
DL	94	Hunter Moreton	Sr
DB	95	Quinton Lee	Sr
DL	96	Charles McCrae	Jr
DL	97	Terry Hampton	Sr
DL	99	Deris Jackson	So
DE		Dennard Flowers	Fr
LB		Eathan Hassler	Fr
S		Cam Jeffery	Fr
DL		Jalil Muhammed	Fr

Special teams

Pos.	#	Name	Class
K	0	Blake Grupe	Sr
LS	38	Jack Bullard	So
P	40	Jacob Enns	Sr
K	43	Elliott Nimrod	So
K	47	Tristan Mattson	So
P	48	Ryan Hanson	So
LS	53	Caleb McCall	So

Head coach

- Butch Jones (Ferris State)

Coordinators/assistant coaches

- Rob Harley (Michigan State)
  Defensive coordinator
- Keith Heckendorf (Nebraska)
  Offensive coordinator/qb
- Curt Baldus (Nebraska)
  Special teams coordinator
- Matt Limegrover (Northwestern)
  Run game coordinator/ol
- Derrick Lett (Bowling Green State)
  Wide receivers
- Ryan Aplin (Arkansas State)
  Running backs
- Andy Kwon (Alabama)
  Tight ends
- John Shalala (Grand View)
  Linebackers
- Dalton Hilliard (UCLA)
  Secondary
- Brandon Joiner (Arkansas State)
  Defensive linemen

Legend

- (C) Team captain
- (S) Suspended
- (I) Ineligible
- Injured
- Redshirt

Roster
Last update: 6 July 2021

== Schedule ==
The 2021 schedule consisted of 6 home and 6 away games in the regular season. The Red Wolves traveled to Sun Belt foes Georgia Southern, South Alabama, Louisiana–Monroe, and Georgia State. Arkansas State would play host to Sun Belt foes Coastal Carolina, Louisiana, Appalachian State, and Texas State.

Arkansas State would host two of the four non-conference opponents at Centennial Bank Stadium, Central Arkansas, from NCAA Division I FCS ASUN Conference and Memphis of the American Athletic Conference, and traveled to Washington of the Pac-12 Conference and Tulsa of the American Athletic Conference.

Date	Time	Opponent	Site	TV	Result	Attendance
September 4	6:00 p.m.	No. 14 (FCS) Central Arkansas*	Centennial Bank Stadium; Jonesboro, AR	ESPN3	W 40–21	15,662
September 11	6:00 p.m.	Memphis*	Centennial Bank Stadium; Jonesboro, AR (Paint Bucket Bowl)	ESPN+	L 50–55	19,501
September 18	3:15 p.m.	at Washington*	Husky Stadium; Seattle, WA	P12N	L 3–52	58,772
September 25	4:00 p.m.	at Tulsa*	Skelly Field at H. A. Chapman Stadium; Tulsa, OK	ESPN+	L 34–41	14,881
October 2	3:00 p.m.	at Georgia Southern	Paulson Stadium; Statesboro, GA	ESPN+	L 33–59	16,377
October 7	6:30 p.m.	No. 15 Coastal Carolina	Centennial Bank Stadium; Jonesboro, AR	ESPNU	L 20–52	12,086
October 21	6:30 p.m.	Louisiana	Centennial Bank Stadium; Jonesboro, AR	ESPNU	L 27–28	7,138
October 30	4:00 p.m.	at South Alabama	Hancock Whitney Stadium; Mobile, AL	ESPN+	L 13–31	15,043
November 6	1:00 p.m.	Appalachian State^{†}	Centennial Bank Stadium; Jonesboro, AR	ESPN+	L 14–48	9,762
November 13	4:00 p.m.	at Louisiana–Monroe	Malone Stadium; Monroe, LA	ESPN+	W 27–24	12,010
November 20	1:00 p.m.	at Georgia State	Center Parc Stadium; Atlanta, GA	ESPN3	L 20–28	14,273
November 27	1:00 p.m.	Texas State	Centennial Bank Stadium; Jonesboro, AR	ESPN+	L 22–24	3,116
*Non-conference game; ^{†}Homecoming; Rankings from AP Poll and CFP Rankings after November 24 released prior to game; All times are in Central time

== Game summaries ==
=== Central Arkansas ===
Central Arkansas at Arkansas State

Team	1	2	3	4	Total
No. 14 (FCS) Bears	7	0	7	7	21
• Red Wolves	3	3	14	20	40

- Date: September 4, 2021
- Location: Centennial Bank Stadium
  Jonesboro, AR
- Game start: 6:05 p.m. CDT
- Elapsed time: 3 hours and 19 minutes
- Game attendance: 15,662
- Referee: William Bonet
- TV announcers (ESPN3): Brad Bobo (play-by-play), Pete Cordelli (analyst) and Cori Keller (sideline)

Scoring summary
1	09:53	UCA	Christian Richmond 66-yard pass from Breylin Smith (Hayden Ray kick) (1 play, 66 yards, 0:10)	UCA 7–0
1	07:08	ARST	Blake Grupe 38-yard field goal (7 plays, 54 yards, 2:45)	UCA 7–3
2	01:14	ARST	Blake Grupe 42-yard field goal (7 plays, 42 yards, 1:26)	UCA 7–6
3	08:21	ARST	Alan Lamar 2-yard rush (Blake Grupe kick) (10 plays, 51 yards, 4:26)	ARST 13–7
3	02:53	ARST	Corey Rucker 34-yard pass from Layne Hatcher (Blake Grupe kick) (8 plays, 91 yards, 3:04)	ARST 20–7
3	00:31	UCA	Lujuan Winningham 7-yard pass from Breylin Smith (Hayden Ray kick) (6 plays, 81 yards, 2:14)	ARST 20–14
4	11:44	ARST	Corey Rucker 8-yard pass from Layne Hatcher (Blake Grupe PAT failed) (7 plays, 83 yards, 3:41)	ARST 26–14
4	11:17	ARST	Corey Rucker 33-yard pass from Layne Hatcher (Blake Grupe kick) (1 play, 33 yards, 0:07)	ARST 33–14
4	07:33	UCA	Lujuan Winningham 14-yard pass from Breylin Smith (Hayden Ray kick) (8 plays, 62 yards, 3:38)	ARST 33–21
4	02:48	ARST	Te'Vailance Hunt 5-yard pass from Layne Hatcher (Blake Grupe kick) (8 plays, 75 yards, 4:45)	ARST 40–21

Statistics	Central Arkansas	Arkansas State
First downs	15	25
Total yards	338	513
Rushing yards	42	194
Passing yards	296	319
Turnovers	2	1
Time of possession	25:58	34:02

Team	Category	Player	Statistics
Central Arkansas	Passing	Breylin Smith	23/42, 296 yards, 3 TDs, 2 INTs
Central Arkansas	Rushing	Darius Hale	13 carries, 28 yards
Central Arkansas	Receiving	Tyler Hudson	7 receptions, 118 yards
Arkansas State	Passing	James Blackman	16/26, 169 yards
Arkansas State	Rushing	Alan Lamar	18 carries, 67 yards, 1 TD
Arkansas State	Receiving	Corey Rucker	9 receptions, 138 yards, 3 TDs

=== Memphis ===
Memphis at Arkansas State

Team	1	2	3	4	Total
• Tigers	20	14	7	14	55
Red Wolves	10	13	7	20	50

- Date: September 11, 2021
- Location: Centennial Bank Stadium
  Jonesboro, AR
- Game start: 6:05 p.m. CDT
- Elapsed time: 3 hours and 47 minutes
- Game attendance: 19,501
- Game weather: 86 °F (30 °C) • Weather: Sunny • Wind: SW 10 MPH
- Referee: Luke Richmond
- TV announcers (ESPN+): Brad Bobo (play–by–play), Pete Cordelli (analyst), and Cori Keller (sideline reporter)

Scoring summary
1	13:20	MEM	Calvin Austin 55-yard pass from Seth Henigan (Joe Doyle kick) (6 plays, 75 yards, 1:40)	MEM 7–0
1	06:11	MEM	Sean Dykes 17-yard pass from Seth Henigan (Joe Doyle PAT failed) (12 plays, 92 yards, 3:10)	MEM 13–0
1	04:30	ARST	Te'Vailance Hunt 53-yard pass from Layne Hatcher (Blake Grupe kick) (4 plays, 68 yards, 1:34)	MEM 13–7
1	04:05	MEM	Brandon Thomas 70-yard rush (Joe Doyle kick) (2 plays, 75 yards, 0:25)	MEM 20–7
1	02:02	ARST	Blake Grupe 48-yard field goal (4 plays, 1 yard, 1:19)	MEM 20–10
2	07:48	ARST	Blake Grupe 37-yard field goal (6 plays, 17 yards, 3:03)	MEM 20–13
2	05:09	MEM	Sean Dykes 40-yard pass from Seth Henigan (Joe Doyle kick) (1 play, 45 yards, 0:14)	MEM 27–13
2	01:30	ARST	Layne Hatcher 12-yard rush (Blake Grupe kick) (10 plays, 75 yards, 3:39)	MEM 27–20
2	01:20	MEM	Brandon Thomas 75-yard rush (Joe Doyle kick) (1 play, 75 yards, 0:06)	MEM 34–20
2	00:00	ARST	Blake Grupe 34-yard field goal (10 plays, 60 yards, 1:15)	MEM 34–23
3	08:43	MEM	Calvin Austin III 50-yard pass from Seth Henigan (Joe Doyle kick) (4 plays, 63 yards, 1:19)	MEM 41–23
3	01:09	ARST	Corey Rucker 23-yard pass from James Blackman (Blake Grupe kick) (4 plays, 79 yards, 1:23)	MEM 41–30
4	11:47	MEM	Marquavius Weaver 4-yard rush (Joe Doyle kick) (11 plays, 72 yards, 4:13)	MEM 48–30
4	10:54	ARST	Jeff Foreman 89-yard pass from James Blackman (two-point pass conversion attempt failed) (2 plays, 91 yards, 0:47)	MEM 48–36
4	10:39	MEM	Calvin Austin 75-yard pass from Seth Henigan (Joe Doyle kick) (2 plays, 75 yards, 0:15)	MEM 55–36
4	05:01	ARST	Adam Jones 1-yard pass from James Blackman (Blake Grupe kick) (15 plays, 73 yards, 5:47)	MEM 55–43
4	01:52	ARST	Akeem Hayes 5-yard pass James Blackman (Blake Grupe kick) (10 plays, 87 yards, 1:56)	MEM 55–50

Statistics	Memphis	Arkansas State
First downs	24	35
Total yards	680	680
Rushing yards	263	98
Passing yards	417	582
Turnovers	2	0
Time of possession	24:04	35:56

Team	Category	Player	Statistics
Memphis	Passing	Seth Henigan	22/33, 417 yards, 5 TDs
Memphis	Rushing	Brandon Thomas	18 carries, 191 yards, 2 TDs
Memphis	Receiving	Calvin Austin	6 receptions, 239 yards, 3 TDs
Arkansas State	Passing	James Blackman	19/28, 306 yards, 4 TDs
Arkansas State	Rushing	Lincoln Pare	6 carries, 36 yards
Arkansas State	Receiving	Jeff Foreman	8 receptions, 198 yards, 1 TD

=== At Washington ===
Arkansas State at Washington

Team	1	2	3	4	Total
Red Wolves	0	0	3	0	3
• Huskies	14	14	7	17	52

- Date: September 18, 2021
- Location: Husky Stadium
  Seattle, WA
- Game start: 3:22 p.m. CDT
- Elapsed time: 3 hours and 20 minutes
- Game attendance: 58,772
- Game weather: 64 °F (18 °C) • Weather: Cloudy • Wind: N 5 MPH
- Referee: Christopher Wiggins
- TV announcers (Pac-12 Network): J. B. Long (play–by–play) and Max Browne (analyst)

Scoring summary
1	08:21	UW	Cade Otton 13-yard pass from Dylan Morris (Tim Horn kick) (10 plays, 88 yards, 4:13)	UW 7–0
1	03:32	UW	Sean McGrew 13-yard rush (Peyton Henry kick) (7 plays, 80 yards, 2:38)	UW 14–0
2	13:40	UW	Richard Newton 2-yard rush (Tim Horn kick) (10 plays, 70 yards, 3:38)	UW 21–0
2	10:00	UW	Jalen McMillan 33-yard pass from Dylan Morris (Peyton Henry kick) (7 plays, 93 yards, 2:30)	UW 28–0
3	04:37	UW	Sean McGrew 2-yard rush (Tim Horn kick) (7 plays, 45 yards, 3:06)	UW 35–0
3	02:55	ARST	Blake Grupe 26-yard field goal (5 plays, 20 yards, 0:43)	UW 35–3
4	13:59	UW	Terrell Bynum 42-yard pass from Dylan Morris (Peyton Henry kick) (2 plays, 54 yards, 0:45)	UW 42–3
4	08:05	UW	Peyton Henry 38-yard field goal (10 plays, 72 yards, 4:35)	UW 45–3
4	03:34	UW	Bralen Trice 72-yard fumble returned (Peyton Henry kick) (14 plays, 47 yards, 4:31)	UW 52–3

Statistics	Arkansas State	Washington
First downs	15	30
Total yards	268	598
Rushing yards	48	200
Passing yards	220	398
Turnovers	3	3
Time of possession	25:06	34:54

Team	Category	Player	Statistics
Arkansas State	Passing	James Blackman	16/38, 176 yards
Arkansas State	Rushing	Johnnie Lang Jr.	6 carries, 18 yards
Arkansas State	Receiving	Lincoln Pare	7 receptions, 69 yards
Washington	Passing	Dylan Morris	23/39, 367 yards, 3 TDs, 2 INTs
Washington	Rushing	Richard Newton	10 carries, 52 yards, 1 TD
Washington	Receiving	Jalen McMillan	10 receptions, 175 yards, 1 TD

=== At Tulsa ===
Arkansas State at Tulsa

Team	1	2	3	4	Total
Red Wolves	14	0	17	3	34
• Golden Hurricane	7	17	14	3	41

- Date: September 25, 2021
- Location: Skelly Field at H. A. Chapman Stadium
  Tulsa, OK
- Game start: 4:05 p.m. CDT
- Elapsed time: 3 hours and 42 minutes
- Game attendance: 14,881
- Game weather: 87 °F (31 °C) • Weather: Sunny • Wind: NE 7 MPH
- Referee: Trennis Livingston
- TV announcers (ESPN+): Courtney Lyle (play–by–play) and Brandon Weeden (analyst)

Scoring summary
1	11:13	ARST	Johnnie Lang Jr. 63-yard punt returned (Blake Grupe kick) (0 plays, 0 yards, 0:00)	ARST 7–0
1	06:03	TUL	Sam Crawford Jr. 88-yard pass from Davis Brin (Zack Long kick) (1 play, 88 yards, 0:12)	TIE 7–7
1	04:50	ARST	Dahu Green 39-yard pass from James Blackman (Blake Grupe kick) (3 plays, 75 yards, 1:10)	ARST 14–7
2	03:23	TUL	Shamari Brooks 25-yard rush (Zack Long kick) (9 plays, 91 yards, 3:04)	TIE 14–14
2	01:55	TUL	JuanCarlos Santana 34-yard pass from Davis Brin (Zack Long kick) (1 play, 34 yards, 0:06)	TUL 21–14
2	00:01	TUL	Zack Long 41-yard field goal (5 plays, 31 yards, 1:13)	TUL 24–14
3	12:53	TUL	Sam Crawford Jr. 17-yard pass from Davis Brin (Zack Long kick) (6 plays, 75 yards, 2:07)	TUL 31–14
3	10:34	ARST	Jeff Foreman 7-yard pass from James Blackman (Blake Grupe kick) (9 plays, 76 yards, 2:14)	TUL 31–21
3	10:23	TUL	Anthony Watkins 75-yard rush (Zack Long kick) (1 play, 75 yards, 0:11)	TUL 38–21
3	10:09	ARST	Alan Lamar 93-yard kickoff returned (Blake Grupe kick) (0 plays, 0 yards, 0:00)	TUL 38–28
3	01:31	ARST	Blake Grupe 38-yard field goal (10 plays, 57 yards, 4:10)	TUL 38–31
4	11:21	TUL	Zack Long 45-yard field goal (14 plays, 48 yards, 5:10)	TUL 41–31
4	06:40	ARST	Blake Grupe 50-yard field goal (6 plays, 39 yards, 1:32)	TUL 41–34

Statistics	Arkansas State	Tulsa
First downs	20	26
Total yards	359	663
Rushing yards	38	308
Passing yards	321	355
Turnovers	2	1
Time of possession	25:36	34:24

Team	Category	Player	Statistics
Arkansas State	Passing	James Blackman	23/37, 321 yards, 2 TDs, 1 INT
Arkansas State	Rushing	Johnnie Lang Jr.	4 carries, 27 yards
Arkansas State	Receiving	Corey Rucker	4 receptions, 115 yards
Tulsa	Passing	Davis Brin	17/25, 355 yards, 3 TDs, 1 INT
Tulsa	Rushing	Shamari Brooks	22 carries, 155 yards, 1 TD
Tulsa	Receiving	Josh Johnson	9 receptions, 127 yards

=== At Georgia Southern ===
Arkansas State at Georgia Southern

Team	1	2	3	4	Total
Red Wolves	3	16	0	14	33
• Eagles	10	21	14	14	59

- Date: October 2, 2021
- Location: Paulson Stadium
  Statesboro, GA
- Game start: 3:05 p.m. CDT
- Elapsed time: 3 hours and 29 minutes
- Game attendance: 16,377
- Game weather: Sunny
- Referee: Wayne Winkler
- TV announcers (ESPN+): Danny Waugh (play–by–play) and Amy Zimmer (analyst)

Scoring summary
1	06:32	GASO	Logan Wright 59-yard rush (Alex Raynor kick) (8 plays, 80 yards, 3:56)	GASO 7–0
1	03:25	ARST	Blake Grupe 31-yard field goal (6 plays, 51 yards, 3:07)	GASO 7–3
1	01:03	GASO	Alex Raynor 25-yard field goal (6 plays, 67 yards, 2:22)	GASO 10–3
2	13:21	ARST	Corey Rucker 2-yard pass from James Blackman (Blake Grupe kick) (9 plays, 75 yards, 2:42)	TIE 10–10
2	09:41	GASO	Gerald Green 23-yard rush (Alex Raynor kick) (9 plays, 74 yards, 3:32)	GASO 17–10
2	06:41	ARST	Team Safety (3 plays, -11 yards, 0:48)	GASO 17–12
2	04:38	ARST	Corey Rucker 19-yard pass from James Blackman (Blake Grupe kick) (5 plays, 53 yards, 1:56)	ARST 19–17
2	03:32	GASO	Logan Wright 41-yard rush (Alex Raynor kick) (4 plays, 75 yards, 1:06)	GASO 24–19
2	02:00	GASO	J. D. King 5-yard rush (Alex Raynor kick) (3 plays, 32 yards, 1:01)	GASO 31–19
3	10:54	GASO	Justin Tomlin 6-yard rush (Alex Raynor kick) (9 plays, 65 yards, 4:06)	GASO 38–19
3	05:08	GASO	Quin Williams 22-yard interception returned (Alex Raynor kick) (4 plays, 8 yards, 1:37)	GASO 45–19
4	14:47	GASO	Jalen White 59-yard rush (Alex Raynor kick) (2 plays, 63 yards, 0:30)	GASO 52–19
4	11:59	ARST	Dahu Green 16-yard pass from Layne Hatcher (Blake Grupe kick) (7 plays, 75 yards, 2:48)	GASO 52–26
4	09:13	ARST	Lincoln Pare 13-yard pass from Layne Hatcher (Blake Grupe kick) (4 plays, 69 yards, 1:03)	GASO 52–33
4	09:03	GASO	Jalen White 47-yard rush (Alex Raynor kick) (1 play, 47 yards, 0:09)	GASO 59–33

Statistics	Arkansas State	Georgia Southern
First downs	34	20
Total yards	524	540
Rushing yards	81	503
Passing yards	443	37
Turnovers	4	0
Time of possession	31:04	28:56

Team	Category	Player	Statistics
Arkansas State	Passing	James Blackman	28/43, 292 yards, 2 TDs, 3 INTs
Arkansas State	Rushing	Lincoln Pare	7 carries, 54 yards
Arkansas State	Receiving	Jeff Foreman	6 receptions, 83 yards
Georgia Southern	Passing	Cam Ransom	2/5, 29 yards
Georgia Southern	Rushing	Logan Wright	10 carries, 214 yards, 2 TDs
Georgia Southern	Receiving	Khaleb Hood	2 receptions, 19 yards

=== Coastal Carolina ===
Coastal Carolina at Arkansas State

Team	1	2	3	4	Total
• No. 15 Chanticleers	10	14	14	14	52
Red Wolves	0	0	14	6	20

- Date: October 7, 2021
- Location: Centennial Bank Stadium
  Jonesboro, AR
- Game start: 6:33 p.m. CDT
- Elapsed time: 3 hours and 31 minutes
- Game attendance: 12,086
- Game weather: 73 °F (23 °C) • Weather: Sunny • Wind: SW 8 MPH
- Referee:
- TV announcers (ESPNU): Mike Couzens (play–by–play) and Dustin Fox (analyst)

Scoring summary
1	11:37	CCU	Isaiah Likely 99-yard pass from Grayson McCall (Massimo Biscardi kick) (2 plays, 99 yards, 00:39)	CCU 7–0
1	01:45	CCU	Massimo Biscardi 19-yard field goal (12 plays, 67 yards, 6:44)	CCU 10–0
2	5:56	CCU	Shermari Jones 8-yard rush( Massimo Biscardi kick) (8 plays, 70 yards, 4:08)	CCU 17–0
2	00:13	CCU	Isaiah Likely 4-yard pass from Grayson McCall ( Massimo Biscardi kick) (7 plays, 51 yards, 4:10)	CCU 24–0
3	13:17	CCU	Isaiah Likely 16-yard pass from Grayson McCall (Massimo Biscardi kick) (4 plays, 75 yards, 1:43)	CCU 31–0
3	9:06	ARST	Corey Rucker 15-yard pass from Layne Hatcher ( Blake Grupe kick) (10 plays, 75 yards, 4:04)	CCU 31–7
3	7:29	CCU	Isaiah Likely 64-yard pass from Grayson McCall (Massimo Biscardi kick) (3 plays, 82 yards, 1:32)	CCU 38–7
3	9:06	ARST	Te'vailance Hunt 63-yard pass from Layne Hatcher ( Blake Grupe kick) (3 plays, 63 yards, 00:26)	CCU 38–14
4	12:21	ARST	Lincoln Pare 1-yard rush (8 plays, 75 yards, 2:23)	CCU 38–20
4	11:28	CCU	Reese White 64-yard rush(Massimo Biscardi kick) (2 plays, 83 yards, 00:46)	CCU 45-20
4	7:49	CCU	Bryce Carpenter 67-yard rush(Massimo Biscardi kick) (3 plays, 76 yards, 2:03)	CCU 52-20

Statistics	Coastal Carolina	Arkansas State
First downs	23	16
Total yards	685	273
Rushing yards	294	18
Passing yards	391	255
Turnovers	0	1
Time of possession	36:27	23:33

Team	Category	Player	Statistics
Coastal Carolina	Passing	Grayson McCall	18/23 365 yards, 4 TDs
Coastal Carolina	Rushing	Shermari Jones	10 carries 113 yards, 1 TD
Coastal Carolina	Receiving	Isaiah Likely	8 receptions 232 yards, 4 TDs
Arkansas State	Passing	Layne Hatcher	13/29 185 yards, 2 TDs
Arkansas State	Rushing	Lincoln Pare	6 carries 29 yards, 1 TD
Arkansas State	Receiving	Te'Vailance Hunt	6 receptions 138 yards, 1 TD

=== Louisiana ===
Louisiana at Arkansas State

Team	1	2	3	4	Total
• RV Ragin' Cajuns	0	14	14	0	28
Red Wolves	0	10	17	0	27

- Date: October 21, 2021
- Location: Centennial Bank Stadium
  Jonesboro, AR
- Game start: 6:33 p.m. CDT
- Elapsed time: 3 hours and 30 minutes
- Game attendance: 7,138
- Game weather: 68 °F (20 °C) • Weather: Sunny • Wind: NW 8 MPH
- Referee: Kyle Olson
- TV announcers (ESPNU): Lowell Galindo (play–by–play) and Rene Ingoglia (analyst)

Scoring summary
2	05:38	ARST	Corey Rucker 6-yard pass from Layne Hutcher (Blake Grupe kick) (13 plays, 94 yards, 5:44)	ARST 7–0
2	05:19	LA	Montrell Johnson 99-yard rush (Nate Snyder kick) (1 play, 99 yards, 0:19)	TIE 7–7
2	02:21	ARST	Blake Grupe 32-yard field goal (10 plays, 66 yards, 2:58)	ARST 10–7
2	00:28	LA	Chris Smith 6-yard rush (Nate Snyder kick) (9 plays, 80 yards, 1:53)	LA 14–10
3	14:07	ARST	Te'Vailance Hunt 76-yard pass from Layne Hatcher (Blake Grupe kick) (2 plays, 80 yards, 0:53)	ARST 17–14
3	12:35	LA	Montrell Johnson 3-yard rush (Nate Snyder kick) (5 plays, 75 yards, 1:32)	LA 21–17
3	09:05	ARST	Emmanuel Stevenson 15-yard pass from Layne Hatcher (Blake Grupe kick) (3 plays, 51 yards, 0:57)	ARST 24–21
3	03:23	ARST	Blake Grupe 35-yard field goal (6 plays, 12 yards, 2:16)	ARST 27–21
3	02:37	LA	Chris Smith 74-yard rush (Nate Snyder kick) (2 plays, 80 yards, 0:46)	LA 28–27

Statistics	Louisiana	Arkansas State
First downs	26	22
Total yards	546	413
Rushing yards	424	113
Passing yards	122	300
Turnovers	2	0
Time of possession	32:47	27:13

Team	Category	Player	Statistics
Louisiana	Passing	Levi Lewis	11/20, 122 yards, 1 INT
Louisiana	Rushing	Chris Smith	24 carries, 238 yards, 2 TDs
Louisiana	Receiving	Dontae Fleming	2 receptions, 47 yards
Arkansas State	Passing	Layne Hatcher	16/31, 300 yards, 3 TDs
Arkansas State	Rushing	Lincoln Pare	11 carries, 52 yards
Arkansas State	Receiving	Te'Vailance Hunt	3 receptions, 83 yards, 1 TD

=== At South Alabama ===
Arkansas State at South Alabama

Team	1	2	3	4	Total
Red Wolves	0	7	3	3	13
• Jaguars	14	14	0	3	31

- Date: October 30, 2021
- Location: Hancock Whitney Stadium
  Mobile, AL
- Game start: 4:00 p.m. CDT
- Elapsed time: 3 hours and 21 minutes
- Game attendance: 15,043
- Game weather: 59 °F (15 °C) • Weather: Cloudy • Wind: WNW 7 MPH
- Referee: Marshall Lewis
- TV announcers (ESPN+): JD Byars (play–by–play) and Pat Greenwood (analyst)

Scoring summary
1	10:48	USA	Jalen Tolbert 13-yard pass from Jake Bentley (Diego Guajardo kick) (8 plays, 79 yards, 4:12)	USA 7–0
1	05:47	USA	Jalen Tolbert 30-yard pass from Jake Bentley (Diego Guajardo kick) (7 plays, 75 yards, 3:24)	USA 14–0
2	08:10	USA	Terrion Avery 2-yard pass from Jake Bentley (Diego Guajardo kick) (18 plays, 99 yards, 8:31)	USA 21–0
2	06:21	USA	Brandon Crum 14-yard pass from Jake Bentley (Diego Guajardo kick) (2 plays, 61 yards, 0:41)	USA 28–0
2	06:06	ARST	Alan Lamar 100-yard kickoff returned (Blake Grupe kick) (0 plays, 0 yards, 0:00)	USA 28–7
3	10:05	ARST	Blake Grupe 32-yard field goal (13 plays, 61 yards, 4:55)	USA 28–10
4	06:22	ARST	Blake Grupe 43-yard field goal (13 plays, 60 yards, 4:30)	USA 28–13
4	04:06	USA	Diego Guajardo 39-yard field goal (5 plays, 29 yards, 2:16)	USA 31–13

Statistics	Arkansas State	South Alabama
First downs	14	23
Total yards	224	421
Rushing yards	38	173
Passing yards	186	248
Turnovers	4	1
Time of possession	24:19	35:41

Team	Category	Player	Statistics
Arkansas State	Passing	Layne Hatcher	19/37, 186 yards, 3 INTs
Arkansas State	Rushing	Lincoln Pare	8 carries, 32 yards
Arkansas State	Receiving	Corey Rucker	4 receptions, 67 yards
South Alabama	Passing	Jake Bentley	29/39, 248 yards, 4 TDs, 1 INT
South Alabama	Rushing	Terrion Avery	22 carries, 113 yards
South Alabama	Receiving	Jalen Tolbert	8 receptions, 94 yards, 2 TDs

=== Appalachian State ===
Appalachian State at Arkansas State

Team	1	2	3	4	Total
• Mountaineers	14	10	14	10	48
Red Wolves	0	14	0	0	14

- Date: November 6, 2021
- Location: Centennial Bank Stadium
  Jonesboro, AR
- Game start: 1:05 p.m. CDT
- Elapsed time: 4 hours and 9 minutes
- Game attendance: 9,762
- Game weather: 60 °F (16 °C) • Weather: Sunny • Wind: NW 2 MPH
- Referee: David Smith
- TV announcers (ESPN+): Brad Bobo (play–by–play), Pete Cordelli (analyst), Cori Keller (sideline reporter)

Scoring summary
1	08:15	APP	Thomas Hennigan 34-yard pass from Malik Williams (Chandler Staton kick) (10 plays, 79 yards, 4:44)	APP 7–0
1	07:22	APP	Steven Jones Jr. 47-yard interception returned (Chandler Staton kick) (3 plays, 8 yards, 0:47)	APP 14–0
2	14:18	ARST	Emmanuel Stevenson 7-yard pass from Layne Hatcher (Blake Grupe kick) (9 plays, 55 yards, 3:08)	APP 14–7
2	10:18	ARST	Ross Painter 20-yard pass from Layne Hatcher (Blake Grupe kick) (5 plays, 33 yards, 1:29)	TIE 14–14
2	07:02	APP	Nate Noel 18-yard rush (Chandler Staton kick) (8 plays, 60 yards, 3:08)	APP 21–14
2	00:03	APP	Chandler Staton 33-yard field goal (12 plays, 57 yards, 5:20)	APP 28–14
3	07:12	APP	Miller Gibbs 10-yard pass from Chase Brice (Chandler Staton kick) (12 plays, 72 yards, 5:00)	APP 31–14
3	02:59	APP	Camerun Peoples 27-yard rush (Chandler Staton kick) (6 plays, 48 yards, 2:15)	APP 38–14
4	05:16	APP	Chandler Staton 22-yard field goal (15 plays, 92 yards, 8:49)	APP 41–14
4	04:01	APP	Steven Jones Jr. 34-yard interception returned (Chandler Staton kick) (3 plays, 1 yards, 1:07)	APP 48–14

Statistics	Appalachian State	Arkansas State
First downs	28	13
Total yards	461	199
Rushing yards	264	62
Passing yards	197	137
Turnovers	1	3
Time of possession	35:33	24:27

Team	Category	Player	Statistics
Appalachian State	Passing	Chase Brice	15/26, 163 yards, 1 TD, 1 INT
Appalachian State	Rushing	Nate Noel	23 carries, 122 yards, 1 TD
Appalachian State	Receiving	Thomas Hennigan	4 receptions, 69 yards, 1 TD
Arkansas State	Passing	Layne Hatcher	17/30, 137 yards, 2 TDs, 3 INTs
Arkansas State	Rushing	Johnnie Lang Jr.	6 carries, 43 yards
Arkansas State	Receiving	Te'Vailance Hunt	3 receptions, 35 yards

=== At Louisiana–Monroe ===
Arkansas State at Louisiana–Monroe

Team	1	2	3	4	Total
• Red Wolves	7	3	7	10	27
Warhawks	0	7	17	0	24

- Date: November 13, 2021
- Location: Malone Stadium
  Monroe, LA
- Game start: 4:05 p.m. CST
- Elapsed time: 3 hours and 12 minutes
- Game attendance: 12,010
- Game weather: 57 °F (14 °C) • Weather: Sunny • Wind: NW 6 MPH
- Referee: Trennis Livingston
- TV announcers (ESPN+): Mike Hammett (play–by–play)

Scoring summary
1	11:15	ARST	Corey Rucker 9-yard rush (Blake Grupe kick) (6 plays, 80 yards, 1:48)	ARST 7–0
2	11:10	ARST	Blake Grupe 30-yard field goal (6 plays, 69 yards, 2:09)	ARST 10–0
2	00:33	ULM	Malik Jackson 3-yard rush (Calum Sutherland kick) (4 plays, 63 yards, 0:55)	ARST 10–7
3	14:48	ULM	Malik Jackson 75-yard rush (Calum Sutherland kick) (1 play, 75 yards, 0:12)	ULM 14–10
3	10:01	ULM	Jevin Frett 17-yard pass from Rhett Rodriguez (Calum Sutherland kick) (7 plays, 50 yards, 2:55)	ULM 21–10
3	07:26	ARST	Te'Vailance Hunt 22-yard pass from Layne Hatcher (Blake Grupe kick) (7 plays, 76 yards, 2:28)	ULM 21–17
3	05:00	ULM	Calum Sutherland 32-yard field goal (7 plays, 60 yards, 2:26)	ULM 24–17
4	07:56	ARST	Te'Vailance Hunt 20-yard pass from Layne Hatcher (Blake Grupe kick) (9 plays, 77 yards, 3:50)	TIE 24–24
4	01:17	ARST	Blake Grupe 42-yard field goal (9 plays, 55 yards, 2:41)	ARST 27–24

Statistics	Arkansas State	Louisiana–Monroe
First downs	22	18
Total yards	538	372
Rushing yards	94	177
Passing yards	444	195
Turnovers	2	2
Time of possession	32:23	27:37

Team	Category	Player	Statistics
Arkansas State	Passing	Layne Hatcher	34/50, 444 yards, 2 TDs, 2 INTs
Arkansas State	Rushing	Lincoln Pare	22 carries, 73 yards
Arkansas State	Receiving	Corey Rucker	7 receptions, 103 yards
Louisiana–Monroe	Passing	Rhett Rodriguez	12/29, 160 yards, 1 TD, 2 INTs
Louisiana–Monroe	Rushing	Malik Jackson	22 carries, 166 yards, 2 TDs
Louisiana–Monroe	Receiving	Boogie Knight	5 receptions, 76 yards

=== At Georgia State ===
Arkansas State at Georgia State

Team	1	2	3	4	Total
Red Wolves	3	10	0	7	20
• Panthers	7	7	0	14	28

- Date: November 20, 2021
- Location: Center Parc Stadium
  Atlanta, GA
- Game start: 1:05 p.m. CST
- Elapsed time: 3 hours and 15 minutes
- Game attendance: 14,273
- Game weather: 57 °F (14 °C) • Weather: Sunny • Wind: E 7 MPH
- Referee: Kyle Olson
- TV announcers (ESPN3): Matt Stewart (play–by–play) and Sam Crenshaw (analyst)

Scoring summary
1	11:27	ARST	Blake Grupe 40-yard field goal (8 plays, 23 yards, 2:43)	ARST 3–0
1	01:36	GSU	Jaymest Williams 1-yard rush (Noel Ruiz kick) (11 plays, 85 yards, 4:11)	GSU 7–3
2	10:49	GSU	Tucker Gregg 6-yard rush (Noel Ruiz kick) (11 plays, 74 yards, 4:03)	GSU 14–3
2	09:44	ARST	Lincoln Pare 83-yard pass from Layne Hatcher (Blake Grupe kick) (3 plays, 77 yards, 1:05)	GSU 14–10
2	00:00	ARST	Blake Grupe 36-yard field goal (14 plays, 48 yards, 4:34)	GSU 14–13
4	14:56	GSU	Jaymest Williams 13-yard rush (Noel Ruiz kick) (4 plays, 68 yards, 1:13)	GSU 21–13
4	12:24	GSU	Darren Grainger 35-yard rush (Noel Ruiz kick) (3 plays, 50 yards, 0:45)	GSU 28–13
4	04:22	ARST	Kivon Bennett 80-yard fumble returned (Blake Grupe kick) (0 plays, 0 yards, 0:00)	GSU 28–20

Statistics	Arkansas State	Georgia State
First downs	16	21
Total yards	270	434
Rushing yards	-3	282
Passing yards	273	152
Turnovers	2	3
Time of possession	30:52	29:08

Team	Category	Player	Statistics
Arkansas State	Passing	Layne Hatcher	28/48, 273 yards, 1 TD, 2 INTs
Arkansas State	Rushing	Lincoln Pare	13 carries, 33 yards
Arkansas State	Receiving	Lincoln Pare	6 receptions, 118 yards, 1 TD
Georgia State	Passing	Darren Grainger	10/21, 152 yards, 1 INT
Georgia State	Rushing	Jaymest Williams	16 carries, 125 yards, 2 TDs
Georgia State	Receiving	Jamari Thrash	4 receptions, 103 yards

=== Texas State ===
Texas State at Arkansas State

Team	1	2	3	4	Total
• Bobcats	14	3	7	0	24
Red Wolves	7	3	3	9	22

- Date: November 27, 2021
- Location: Centennial Bank Stadium
  Jonesboro, AR
- Game start: 1:05 CST
- Elapsed time: 3 hours and 15 minutes
- Game attendance: 3,116
- Game weather: 57 °F (14 °C) • Weather: Sunny • Wind: SSW 13 mph
- Referee: Wayne Winkler
- TV announcers (ESPN+): Brad Bobo (play–by–play), Pete Cordelli (analyst), and Cori Keller (sideline reporter)

Scoring summary
1	10:38	TXST	Jahmyl Jeter 4 yd run (Seth Keller kick) (10 plays, 75 yards, 4:22)	TXST 7–0
1	8:21	ARST	Dahu Green 39 yd pass from Layne Hatcher (Blake Grupe kick) (5 plays, 71 yards, 2:10)	TIE 7–7
1	5:47	TXST	Trevis Graham Jr. 31 yd pass from Tyler Vitt (Seth Keller kick) (6 plays, 67 yards, 2:22)	TXST 14–7
2	8:26	ARST	Blake Grupe 23 yd field goal (14 plays, 81 yards, 4:59)	TXST 14–10
2	3:09	TXST	Seth Keller 46 yd field goal (5 plays, 15 yards, 1:31)	TXST 17–10
3	10:43	ARST	Blake Grupe 22 yd field goal (10 plays, 70 yards, 4:17)	TXST 17–13
3	8:06	TXST	Calvin Hill 6 yd run (Seth Keller kick) (6 plays, 83 yards, 2:28)	TXST 24–13
4	12:17	ARST	Blake Grupe 22 yd field goal (11 plays, 55 yards, 5:16)	TXST 24–16
4	2:12	ARST	Corey Rucker 26 yd pass from Layne Hatcher (2-point pass conversion failed) (8 plays, 86 yards, 4:06)	TXST 24–22

Statistics	Texas State	Arkansas State
First downs	14	25
Total yards	333	471
Rushing yards	203	194
Passing yards	130	277
Turnovers	0	0
Time of possession	24:51	35:09

Team	Category	Player	Statistics
Texas State	Passing	Tyler Vitt	11/25, 121 yds, 1 TD
Texas State	Rushing	Calvin Hill	13 car, 125 yds, 1 TD
Texas State	Receiving	Trevis Graham Jr.	4 rec, 67 yds, 1 TD
Arkansas State	Passing	Layne Hatcher	25/37, 277 yds, 2 TD
Arkansas State	Rushing	Alan Lamar	12 car, 88 yds
Arkansas State	Receiving	Corey Rucker	8 rec, 85 yds, 1 TD
