= O'Cyrus Torrence =

American football player (born 2000)

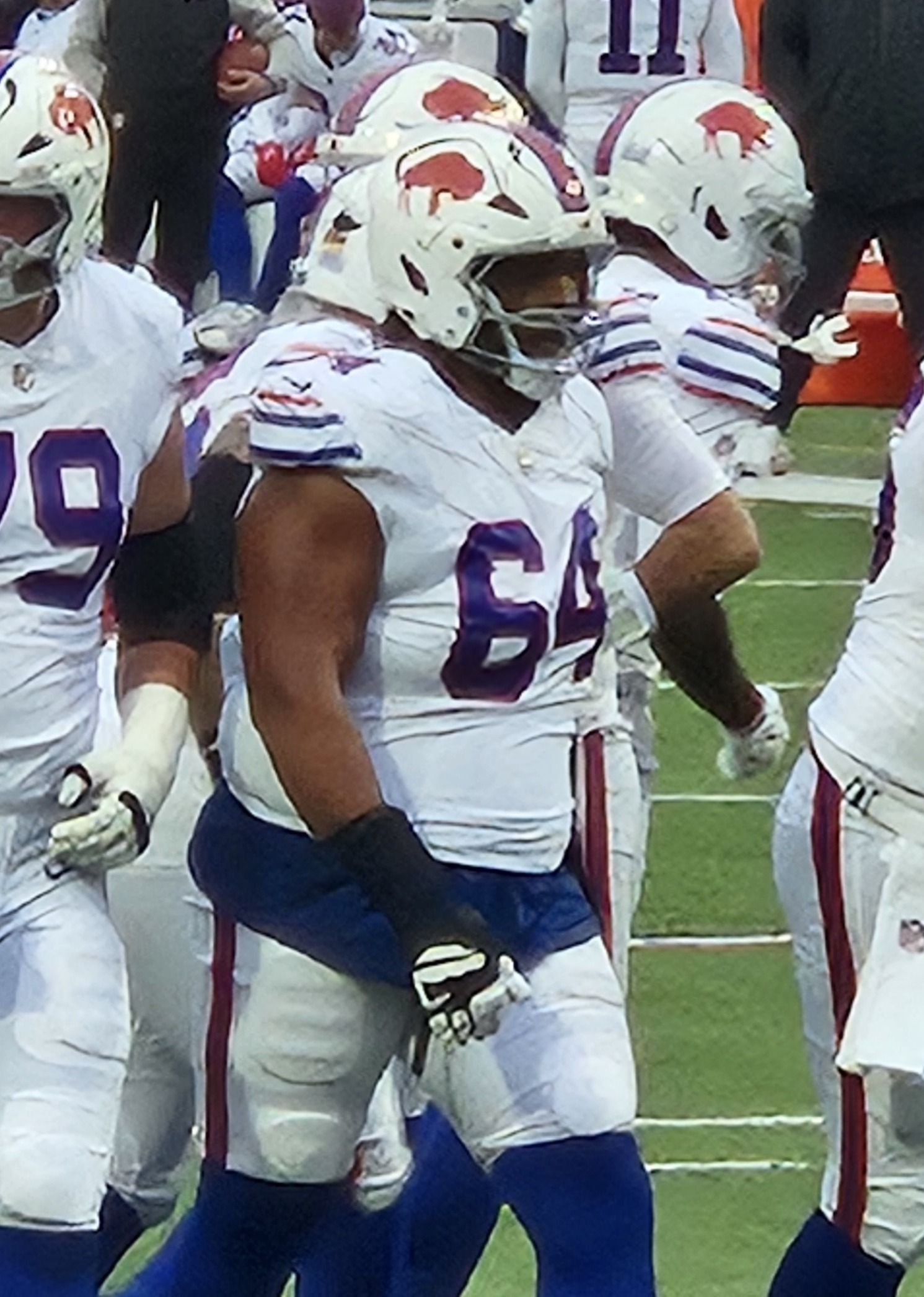
- Torrence with the Buffalo Bills in 2025

No. 64 – Buffalo Bills
- Position: Guard
- Roster status: Active

Personal information
- Born: January 20, 2000 (age 26); Hammond, Louisiana, U.S.
- Listed height: 6 ft 5 in (1.96 m)
- Listed weight: 330 lb (150 kg)

Career information
- High school: St. Helena Central (Greensburg, Louisiana)
- College: Louisiana (2019–2021); Florida (2022)
- NFL draft: 2023: 2nd round, 59th overall pick

Career history
- Buffalo Bills (2023–present)

Awards and highlights
- PFWA All-Rookie Team (2023); Consensus All-American (2022); First-team All-SEC (2022); First-team All-Sun Belt (2021); Second-team All-Sun Belt (2020)

Career NFL statistics as of 2025
- Games played: 51
- Games started: 50
- Stats at Pro Football Reference

O'Cyrus Torrence (born January 20, 2000) is an American professional football guard for the Buffalo Bills of the National Football League (NFL). He played college football for the Louisiana Ragin' Cajuns and Florida Gators.

== Early life ==
Torrence grew up in Greensburg, Louisiana and attended St. Helena Central High School. He was a three-star recruit and committed to play college football at Louisiana–Lafayette over offers from Georgia, Louisiana Tech, Louisiana–Monroe, South Alabama, Southern Mississippi, and Middle Tennessee.

== College career ==
Torrence began his college career at Louisiana–Lafayette. He started 13 of the Ragin' Cajuns' 14 games as a true freshman. In his sophomore season, he started all 11 of Louisiana's games and was named second team All-Sunbelt Conference. As a junior Torrence started 12 games at right guard, missing two games due to an injury, and was named first team All-Sun Belt and rated the fourth-best offensive guard in the nation by Pro Football Focus. After the end of the season he entered the NCAA transfer portal.

Torrence ultimately transferred to Florida, following former Louisiana–Lafayette head coach Billy Napier. He was named a consensus All-American that season.

== Professional career ==
Pre-draft measurables
Height	Weight	Arm length	Hand span	Wingspan	40-yard dash	10-yard split	20-yard split	20-yard shuttle	Three-cone drill	Vertical jump	Broad jump	Bench press
6 ft 5 3/8 in (1.97 m)	330 lb (150 kg)	33 7/8 in (0.86 m)	11 1/4 in (0.29 m)	6 ft 11 7/8 in (2.13 m)	5.31 s	1.84 s	3.04 s	4.81 s	8.09 s	23.5 in (0.60 m)	8 ft 5 in (2.57 m)	23 reps
All values from NFL Combine/Pro Day

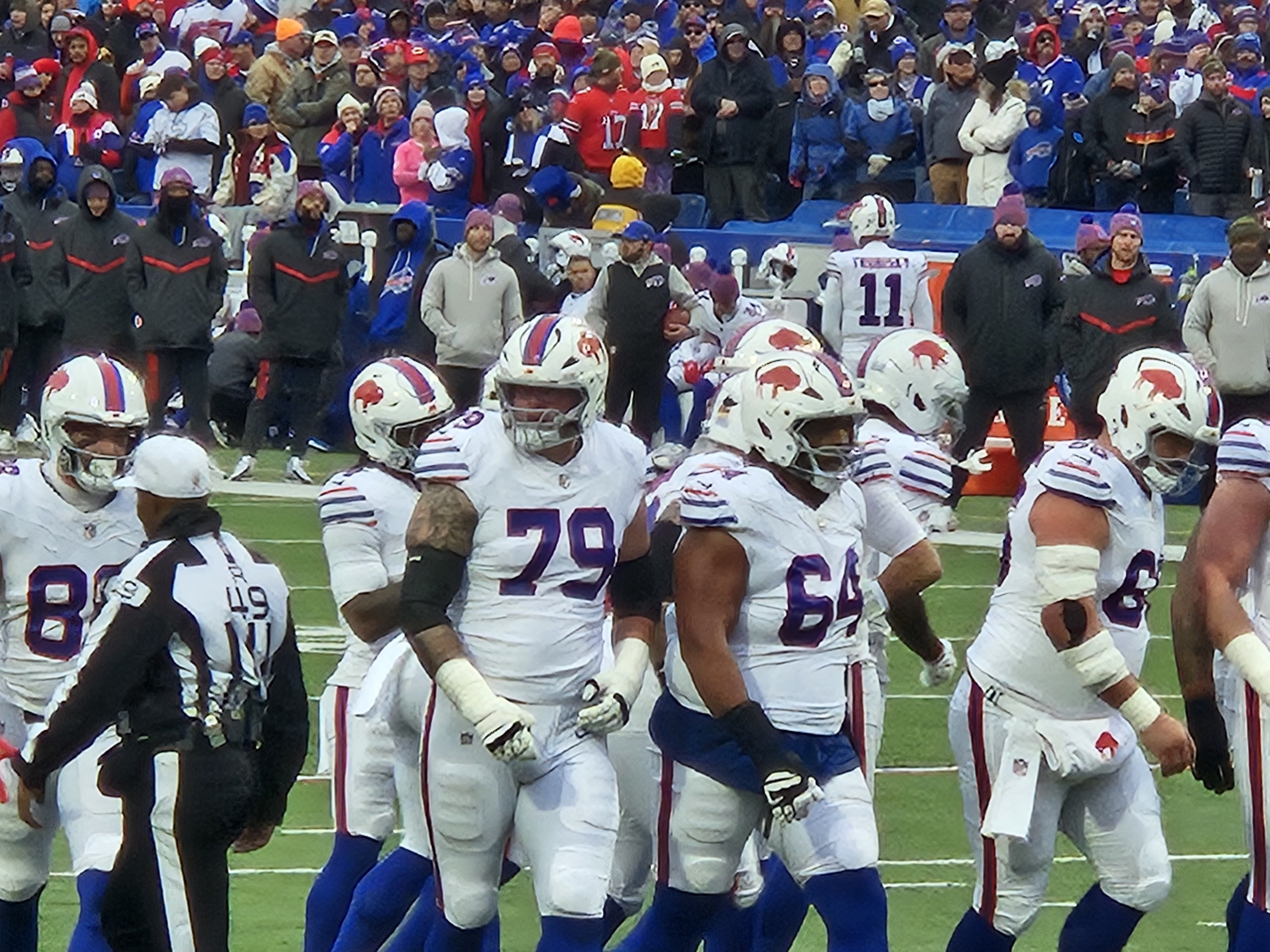
Torrence (#64) and the Bills' offensive line against the Tampa Bay Buccaneers in 2025

Torrence was selected by the Buffalo Bills with the 59th overall pick in the second round of the 2023 NFL draft. He was named to the PFWA All-Rookie Team.

On August 7, 2026, Torrence signed a four-year, $78.4 million contract extension with $46 million guaranteed, keeping him under contract with the Bills through the 2030 season.
