= 2021 Sun Belt Conference football season =

- League: NCAA Division I Football Bowl Subdivision
- Sport: Football
- Duration: September 2, 2021 – December 25, 2021
- Teams: 10

2022 NFL Draft
- Top draft pick: WR Jalen Tolbert, South Alabama
- Picked by: Dallas Cowboys, 88th overall

Regular season
- East champions: Appalachian State
- West champions: Louisiana

SBC Championship Game
- Date: December 4, 2021
- Venue: Cajun Field, Lafayette, Louisiana
- Champions: Louisiana
- Runners-up: Appalachian State
- Finals MVP: QB Levi Lewis, Louisiana

Seasons
- ← 2020 2022 →

2021 Sun Belt Conference football standings
	Conf.			Overall
Team	W		L	W		L
East Division
Appalachian State xy	7	–	1	10	–	4
Georgia State	6	–	2	8	–	5
Coastal Carolina	6	–	2	11	–	2
Troy	3	–	5	5	–	7
Georgia Southern	2	–	6	3	–	9
West Division
No. 16 Louisiana xy$	8	–	0	13	–	1
Texas State	3	–	5	4	–	8
Louisiana–Monroe	2	–	6	4	–	8
South Alabama	2	–	6	5	–	7
Arkansas State	1	–	7	2	–	10
Championship: Louisiana 24, Appalachian State 16
$ – Conference champion; x – Division champion/co-champions; y – Championship game participant; Rankings from AP Poll

The 2021 Sun Belt Conference football season was the 21st season of college football play for the Sun Belt Conference. The season began September 2, 2021 and concluded with its championship game on December 4, 2021. It was part of the 2021 NCAA Division I FBS football season. The Sun Belt Conference consists of 10 football members split into two divisions. The conference released its schedule on March 1, 2021.

== Preseason ==
=== Preseason Media Poll ===
The Preseason Media Poll was released on July 20. Coastal Carolina and Appalachian State tied as the favorites for the East Division, while Louisiana was favored to win the West Division.

East
Predicted finish	Team	Votes (1st place)
T1	Coastal Carolina	44 (6)
T1	Appalachian State	44 (4)
3	Georgia State	24
4	Georgia Southern	20
5	Troy	18

West
Predicted finish	Team	Votes (1st place)
1	Louisiana	49 (9)
2	Arkansas State	38 (1)
3	South Alabama	27
4	Texas State	25
5	Louisiana–Monroe	11

=== Preseason awards ===
The following list contains players and coaches included on preseason watch lists for national awards.

Award	Head coach/Player	School	Position	Link
Lott Trophy	Silas Kelly	Coastal Carolina	LB	
Dodd Trophy	Jamey Chadwell	Coastal Carolina	Head coach	
Maxwell Award	Camerun Peoples	Appalachian State	RB	
Maxwell Award	Layne Hatcher	Arkansas State	QB	
Maxwell Award	Grayson McCall	Coastal Carolina	QB	
Maxwell Award	Levi Lewis	Louisiana	QB	
Maxwell Award	Jalen Tolbert	South Alabama	WR	
Bednarik Award	Demetrius Taylor	Appalachian State	DE	
Bednarik Award	Shaun Jolly	Appalachian State	CB	
Bednarik Award	Jeffrey Gunter	Coastal Carolina	DE	
Bednarik Award	Derrick Canteen	Georgia Southern	CB	
Bednarik Award	Bralen Trahan	Louisiana	S	
Bednarik Award	Carlton Martial	Troy	LB	
Davey O'Brien Award	Levi Lewis	Louisiana	QB	
Davey O'Brien Award	Grayson McCall	Coastal Carolina	QB	
Doak Walker Award	JD King	Georgia Southern	RB	
Doak Walker Award	Marcel Murray	Arkansas State	RB	
Doak Walker Award	Camerun Peoples	Appalachian State	RB	
Fred Biletnikoff Award	Jaivon Heiligh	Coastal Carolina	WR	
Fred Biletnikoff Award	Isaiah Likely	Coastal Carolina	TE	
Fred Biletnikoff Award	Sam Pinckney	Georgia State	WR	
Fred Biletnikoff Award	Jalen Tolbert	South Alabama	WR	
John Mackey Award	Isaiah Likely	Coastal Carolina	TE	
John Mackey Award	Roger Carter	Georgia State	TE	
John Mackey Award	Henry Pearson	Appalachian State	TE	
John Mackey Award	Johnny Lumpkin	Louisiana	TE	
Rimington Trophy	Baer Hunter	Appalachian State	C	
Rimington Trophy	Shane Vallot	Louisiana	C	
Rimington Trophy	Dylan Bradshaw	Troy	C	
Butkus Award	Carlton Martial	Troy	LB	
Outland Trophy	C. J. Brewer	Coastal Carolina	DT	
Outland Trophy	Trey Carter	Coastal Carolina	G	
Outland Trophy	Will Choloh	Troy	DT	
Outland Trophy	Shamarious Gilmore	Georgia State	G	
Outland Trophy	Baer Hunter	Appalachian State	C	
Outland Trophy	O'Cyrus Torrence	Louisiana	G	
Bronko Nagurski Trophy	C. J. Brewer	Coastal Carolina	DT	
Bronko Nagurski Trophy	Will Choloh	Troy	DT	
Bronko Nagurski Trophy	Carlton Martial	Troy	LB	
Bronko Nagurski Trophy	Demetrius Taylor	Appalachian State	DE	
Bronko Nagurski Trophy	Bralen Trahan	Louisiana	S	
Lou Groza Award	Massimo Biscardi	Coastal Carolina	K	
Paul Hornung Award	Khaleb Hood	Georgia Southern	WR	
Paul Hornung Award	Chris Smith	Louisiana	RB	
Paul Hornung Award	Caleb Spurlin	Appalachian State	DL	
Wuerffel Trophy	Thomas Hennigan	Appalachian State	WR	
Wuerffel Trophy	Andre Harris Jr.	Arkansas State	OL	
Wuerffel Trophy	Kennedy Roberts	Coastal Carolina	DL	
Wuerffel Trophy	Levi Lewis	Louisiana	QB	
Wuerffel Trophy	Keith Gallmon	South Alabama	DB	
Wuerffel Trophy	Tyler Vitt	Texas State	QB	
Wuerffel Trophy	Luke Whittemore	Troy	WR	
Walter Camp Award	Grayson McCall	Coastal Carolina	QB	
Walter Camp Award	Demetrius Taylor	Appalachian State	DE	
Manning Award	Cornelious Brown	Georgia State	QB	
Manning Award	Layne Hatcher	Arkansas State	QB	
Manning Award	Levi Lewis	Louisiana	QB	
Manning Award	Grayson McCall	Coastal Carolina	QB	
Earl Campbell Tyler Rose Award	Ken Marks	Louisiana	OL	
Ray Guy Award	Anthony Beck II	Georgia Southern	P	
Ray Guy Award	Charles Ouverson	Coastal Carolina	P	
Ray Guy Award	Jack Brooks	South Alabama	P	
Ray Guy Award	Rhys Byrns	Louisiana	P	
Ray Guy Award	Ryan Hanson	Arkansas State	P	
Ray Guy Award	Xavier Subotsch	Appalachian State	P	
Johnny Unitas Golden Arm Award	Jake Bentley	South Alabama	QB	
Johnny Unitas Golden Arm Award	Chase Brice	Appalachian State	QB	
Johnny Unitas Golden Arm Award	Levi Lewis	Louisiana	QB	
Johnny Unitas Golden Arm Award	Grayson McCall	Coastal Carolina	QB	

=== Preseason All-Conference teams ===
- Offensive Player of the Year: Grayson McCall (Redshirt Sophomore, Coastal Carolina quarterback)
- Defensive Player of the Year: Carlton Martial (Junior, Troy linebacker)

Position	Player	Team
First Team Offense
QB	Grayson McCall	Coastal Carolina
RB	Camerun Peoples	Appalachian State
RB	Destin Coates	Georgia State
OL	Baer Hunter	Appalachian State
OL	Shamarious Gilmore	Georgia State
OL	Cooper Hodges	Appalachian State
OL	Austin Stidham	Troy
OL	O'Cyrus Torrence	Louisiana
TE	Isaiah Likely	Coastal Carolina
WR	Jalen Tolbert	South Alabama
WR	Jaivon Heiligh	Coastal Carolina
WR	Sam Pinckney	Georgia State
First Team Defense
DL	Jeffrey Gunter	Coastal Carolina
DL	C. J. Brewer	Coastal Carolina
DL	Demetrius Taylor	Appalachian State
DL	Will Choloh	Troy
LB	Carlton Martial	Troy
LB	D'Marco Jackson	Appalachian State
LB	Silas Kelly	Coastal Carolina
DB	Derrick Canteen	Georgia Southern
DB	Shaun Jolly	Appalachian State
DB	D'Jordan Strong	Coastal Carolina
DB	Bralen Trahan	Louisiana
First Team Special Teams
K	Noel Ruiz	Georgia State
P	Rhys Byrns	Louisiana
RS	Chris Smith	Louisiana

Position	Player	Team
Second Team Offense
QB	Levi Lewis	Louisiana
RB	JD King	Georgia Southern
RB	Daetrich Harrington	Appalachian State
OL	Trey Carter	Coastal Carolina
OL	Max Mitchell	Louisiana
OL	Dylan Bradshaw	Troy
OL	Willie Lampkin	Coastal Carolina
OL	Aaron Dowdell	Georgia Southern
TE	Roger Carter	Georgia State
WR	Thomas Hennigan	Appalachian State
WR	Marcell Barbee	Texas State
WR	Cornelius McCoy	Georgia State
Second Team Defense
DL	Zi'Yon Hill	Louisiana
DL	Hardrick Willis	Georgia State
DL	Dontae Wilson	Georgia State
DL	Nico Ezidore	Texas State
LB	Lorenzo McCaskill	Louisiana
LB	Teddy Gallagher	Coastal Carolina
LB	Brendan Harrington	Appalachian State
DB	Antavious Lane	Georgia State
DB	Quavian White	Georgia State
DB	Keith Gallmon	South Alabama
DB	Eric Garror	Louisiana
Second Team Special Teams
K	Massimo Biscardi	Coastal Carolina
P	Anthony Beck II	Georgia Southern
RS	Khaleb Hood	Georgia Southern

== Head coaches ==
Prior to the season, Arkansas State, Louisiana–Monroe, and South Alabama saw coaching changes. At Arkansas State, Butch Jones was named head coach after previous head coach Blake Anderson left the team to take the head coach position with Utah State of the Mountain West Conference. At Louisiana–Monroe, Terry Bowden took over as head coach after Matt Viator was fired by the school. At South Alabama, Kane Wommack took over as head coach after previous head coach Steve Campbell was fired by the school.

Team	Head coach	Previous Job	Years at school	Overall record	Sun Belt record	Sun Belt titles
Appalachian State	Shawn Clark	Appalachian State (Off. Line Coach)	2	10–3 (.769)	6–2 (.750)	0
Arkansas State	Butch Jones	Alabama (assistant coach)	1	84–54 (.609)	0–0 (–)	0
Coastal Carolina	Jamey Chadwell	Coastal Carolina (Off. Coordinator)	4	79–52 (.603)	12–12 (.500)	1
Georgia Southern	Chad Lunsford	Georgia Southern (assistant coach)	5	27–18 (.600)	17–13 (.567)	0
Georgia State	Shawn Elliott	South Carolina (Off. Line Coach)	5	22–25 (.468)	14–18 (.438)	0
Louisiana	Billy Napier	Arizona State (Off. Coordinator)	4	28–11 (.718)	19–5 (.792)	1
Louisiana–Monroe	Terry Bowden	Clemson (Grad. Assistant)	1	175–114–2 (.605)	0–0 (–)	0
South Alabama	Kane Wommack	Indiana (Def. Coordinator)	1	0–0 (–)	0–0 (–)	0
Texas State	Jake Spavital	West Virginia (Off. Coordinator)	3	5–19 (.208)	4–12 (.250)	0
Troy	Chip Lindsey	Auburn (Off. Coordinator)	3	10–13 (.435)	6–9 (.400)	0

=== Mid-Season changes ===
- On September 26, Georgia Southern announced that they had fired Chad Lunsford. Georgia Southern named cornerbacks coach Kevin Whitley as the interim head coach. Former USC head coach Clay Helton was later announced as the permanent replacement for Lunsford beginning in 2022.
- On November 21, Troy announced that they had fired Chip Lindsey. Troy named defensive coordinator Brandon Hall as the interim head coach. On December 3, the school announced Kentucky defensive coordinator Jon Sumrall as the new permanent head coach.

=== Post-season changes ===
- On November 28, Billy Napier announced that he would become the new head coach at Florida in the Southeastern Conference starting in 2022. On December 5, Louisiana promoted assistant head coach Michael Desormeaux to head coach, beginning with the school's season-ending bowl game.

== Rankings ==
		Pre	Wk 1	Wk 2	Wk 3	Wk 4	Wk 5	Wk 6	Wk 7	Wk 8	Wk 9	Wk 10	Wk 11	Wk 12	Wk 13	Wk 14	Final
Appalachian State	AP		RV				RV	RV		RV	RV	RV	RV	RV	RV	RV	
Appalachian State	C	RV	RV			RV	RV	RV		RV	RV	RV	RV	RV	RV	RV	
Appalachian State	CFP	Not released															
Arkansas State	AP																
Arkansas State	C																
Arkansas State	CFP	Not released															
Coastal Carolina	AP	22	17	16	17	16	15	15	14	24	21	22	RV				RV
Coastal Carolina	C	24	19	18	17	16т	15	15	16	24	21	21	RV	RV	RV	RV	RV
Coastal Carolina	CFP	Not released															
Georgia Southern	AP																
Georgia Southern	C																
Georgia Southern	CFP	Not released															
Georgia State	AP																
Georgia State	C																
Georgia State	CFP	Not released															
Louisiana	AP	23	RV						RV	RV	24	24	22	23	20	16	16
Louisiana	C	23	RV	RV	RV	RV	RV	RV	RV	RV	RV	25	21	23	21	17	18
Louisiana	CFP	Not released													24	23	
Louisiana–Monroe	AP																
Louisiana–Monroe	C																
Louisiana–Monroe	CFP	Not released															
South Alabama	AP																
South Alabama	C																
South Alabama	CFP	Not released															
Texas State	AP																
Texas State	C																
Texas State	CFP	Not released															
Troy	AP																
Troy	C																
Troy	CFP	Not released															

Legend
	Improvement in ranking
	Drop in ranking
	Not ranked previous week
	No change in ranking from previous week
RV	Received votes but were not ranked in Top 25 of poll
т	Tied with team above or below also with this symbol

== Schedule ==
Index to colors and formatting
Sun Belt member won
Sun Belt member lost
Sun Belt teams in **bold**

All times Central time.

=== Week 1 ===
Date	Time	Visiting team	Home team	Site	TV	Result	Attendance	Ref.
September 2	6:00 p.m.	The Citadel	No. 22 **Coastal Carolina**	Brooks Stadium • Conway, SC	ESPN+	**W** 52–14	16,236	
September 2	6:30 p.m.	East Carolina	**Appalachian State**	Bank of America Stadium • Charlotte, NC (Duke's Mayo Classic)	ESPNU	**W** 33–19	36,752	
September 4	11:00 a.m.	Army	**Georgia State**	Center Parc Stadium • Atlanta, GA	ESPNU	**L** 10–43	18,280	
September 4	11:00 a.m.	**Louisiana–Monroe**	Kentucky	Kroger Field • Lexington, KY	SECN	**L** 10–45	47,693	
September 4	3:30 p.m.	No. 23 **Louisiana**	No. 21 Texas	Darrell K Royal–Texas Memorial Stadium • Austin, TX	FOX	**L** 18–38	91,113	
September 4	5:00 p.m.	Gardner–Webb	**Georgia Southern**	Allen E. Paulson Stadium • Statesboro, GA	ESPN3	**W** 30–25	15,089	
September 4	6:00 p.m.	No. 14 (FCS) Central Arkansas	**Arkansas State**	Centennial Bank Stadium • Jonesboro, AR	ESPN3	**W** 40–21	15,662	
September 4	6:00 p.m.	Baylor	**Texas State**	Bobcat Stadium • San Marcos, TX	ESPN+	**L** 20–29	26,573	
September 4	6:00 p.m.	Southern	**Troy**	Veterans Memorial Stadium • Troy, AL	ESPN3	**W** 55–3	22,399	
September 4	7:00 p.m.	Southern Miss	**South Alabama**	Hancock Whitney Stadium • Mobile, AL	ESPN+	**W** 31–7	20,156	
^{#}Rankings from AP Poll released prior to game. All times are in Central Time.

=== Week 2 ===
Date	Time	Visiting team	Home team	Site	TV	Result	Attendance	Ref.
September 10	6:30 p.m.	Kansas	No. 17 **Coastal Carolina**	Brooks Stadium • Conway, SC	ESPN2	**W** 49–22	17,697	
September 11	2:30 p.m.	**Georgia Southern**	Florida Atlantic	FAU Stadium • Boca Raton, FL	Stadium	**L** 6–38	17,736	
September 11	3:00 p.m.	**South Alabama**	Bowling Green	Doyt Perry Stadium • Bowling Green, OH	ESPN+	**W** 22–19	15,105	
September 11	6:00 p.m.	**Appalachian State**	No. 22 Miami (FL)	Hard Rock Stadium • Miami Gardens, FL	ESPNU	**L** 23–25	45,877	
September 11	6:00 p.m.	Nicholls	**Louisiana**	Cajun Field • Lafayette, LA	ESPN3	**W** 27–24	25,417	
September 11	6:00 p.m.	**Texas State**	FIU	Riccardo Silva Stadium • Miami, FL	ESPN+	**W** 23–17 ^{OT}	0	
September 11	6:00 p.m.	Liberty	**Troy**	Veterans Memorial Stadium • Troy, AL	ESPN+	**L** 13–21	24,714	
September 11	6:00 p.m.	Memphis	**Arkansas State**	Centennial Bank Stadium • Jonesboro, AR (Paint Bucket Bowl)	ESPN+	**L** 50–55	19,501	
September 11	6:30 p.m.	**Georgia State**	No. 24 North Carolina	Kenan Memorial Stadium • Chapel Hill, NC	ESPN3	**L** 17–59	50,500	
^{#}Rankings from AP Poll released prior to game. All times are in Central Time.

=== Week 3 ===
Date	Time	Visiting team	Home team	Site	TV	Result	Attendance	Ref.
September 16	7:00 p.m.	Ohio	**Louisiana**	Cajun Field • Lafayette, LA	ESPN	**W** 49–14	17,709	
September 18	11:00 a.m.	No. 16 **Coastal Carolina**	Buffalo	UB Stadium • Buffalo, NY	ESPN2	**W** 28–25	16,739	
September 18	2:30 p.m.	Elon	**Appalachian State**	Kidd Brewer Stadium • Boone, NC	ESPN+	**W** 44–10	30,224	
September 18	3:00 p.m.	**Georgia Southern**	No. 20 Arkansas	Donald W. Reynolds Razorback Stadium • Fayetteville, AR	SECN	**L** 10–45	66,311	
September 18	3:15 p.m.	**Arkansas State**	Washington	Husky Stadium • Seattle, WA	P12N	**L** 3–52	58,772	
September 18	6:00 p.m.	Charlotte	**Georgia State**	Center Parc Stadium • Atlanta, GA	ESPN+	**W** 20–9	12,978	
September 18	6:00 p.m.	**Troy**	Southern Miss	M. M. Roberts Stadium • Hattiesburg, MS	ESPN+	**W** 21–9	24,242	
September 18	6:00 p.m.	Incarnate Word	**Texas State**	Bobcat Stadium • San Marcos, TX	ESPN3	**L** 34–42	16,107	
September 18	7:00 p.m.	Jackson State	**Louisiana–Monroe**	Malone Stadium • Monroe, LA	ESPN3	**W** 12–7	21,720	
September 18	7:00 p.m.	Alcorn State	**South Alabama**	Hancock Whitney Stadium • Mobile, AL	ESPN3	**W** 28–21	15,204	
^{#}Rankings from AP Poll released prior to game. All times are in Central Time.

=== Week 4 ===
Date	Time	Visiting team	Home team	Site	TV	Result	Attendance	Ref.
September 23	6:30 p.m.	Marshall	**Appalachian State**	Kidd Brewer Stadium • Boone, NC	ESPN	**W** 31–30	28,377	
September 25	12:00 p.m.	UMass	No. 17 **Coastal Carolina**	Brooks Stadium • Conway, SC	ESPN+	**W** 53–3	15,261	
September 25	1:00 p.m.	**Texas State**	Eastern Michigan	Rynearson Stadium • Ypsilanti, MI	ESPN+	**L** 21–59	14,253	
September 25	3:00 p.m.	**Georgia State**	No. 23 Auburn	Jordan–Hare Stadium • Auburn, AL	SECN	**L** 24–34	86,650	
September 25	4:00 p.m.	**Arkansas State**	Tulsa	H. A. Chapman Stadium • Tulsa, OK	ESPN+	**L** 34–41	14,881	
September 25	5:00 p.m.	**Louisiana**	**Georgia Southern**	Allen E. Paulson Stadium • Statesboro, GA	ESPN+	**ULL** 28–20	17,522	
September 25	7:00 p.m.	**Troy**	**Louisiana–Monroe**	Malone Stadium • Monroe, LA	ESPN+	**ULM** 29–16	12,766	
^{#}Rankings from AP Poll released prior to game. All times are in Central Time.

=== Week 5 ===
Date	Time	Visiting team	Home team	Site	TV	Result	Attendance	Ref.
October 2	1:00 p.m.	**Appalachian State**	**Georgia State**	Center Parc Stadium • Atlanta, GA	ESPN+	**APPST** 45–16	14,258	
October 2	1:30 p.m.	**Louisiana–Monroe**	No. 16 **Coastal Carolina**	Brooks Stadium • Conway, SC	ESPN+	**CCU** 59–6	18,674	
October 2	2:30 p.m.	**Troy**	South Carolina	Williams–Brice Stadium • Columbia, SC	SECN	**L** 14–23	60,866	
October 2	3:00 p.m.	**Arkansas State**	**Georgia Southern**	Allen E. Paulson Stadium • Statesboro, GA	ESPN+	**GASO** 59–33	16,377	
October 2	7:00 p.m.	**Louisiana**	**South Alabama**	Hancock Whitney Stadium • Mobile, AL	ESPN+	**ULL** 20–18	16,764	
^{#}Rankings from AP Poll released prior to game. All times are in Central Time.

=== Week 6 ===
Date	Time	Visiting team	Home team	Site	TV	Result	Attendance	Ref.
October 7	6:30 p.m.	No. 15 **Coastal Carolina**	**Arkansas State**	Centennial Bank Stadium • Jonesboro, AR	ESPNU	**CCU** 52–20	12,086	
October 9	6:00 p.m.	**Georgia Southern**	**Troy**	Veterans Memorial Stadium • Troy, AL	ESPN+	**TROY** 27–24	25,424	
October 9	6:00 p.m.	**South Alabama**	**Texas State**	Bobcat Stadium • San Marcos, TX	ESPN+	**TXST** 33–31 ^{4OT}	16,223	
October 9	7:00 p.m.	**Georgia State**	**Louisiana–Monroe**	Malone Stadium • Monroe, LA	ESPN3	**GSU** 55–21	9,913	
^{#}Rankings from AP Poll released prior to game. All times are in Central Time.

=== Week 7 ===
Date	Time	Visiting team	Home team	Site	TV	Result	Attendance	Ref.
October 12	6:30 p.m.	**Appalachian State**	**Louisiana**	Cajun Field • Lafayette, LA	ESPN2	**ULL** 41–13	20,066	
October 14	6:30 p.m.	**Georgia Southern**	**South Alabama**	Hancock Whitney Stadium • Mobile, AL	ESPNU	**SOAL** 41–14	16,089	
October 16	2:00 p.m.	**Troy**	**Texas State**	Bobcat Stadium • San Marcos, TX	ESPN+	**TROY** 31–28	15,083	
October 16	6:00 p.m.	Liberty	**Louisiana–Monroe**	Malone Stadium • Monroe, LA	ESPN+	**W** 31–28	11,546	
^{#}Rankings from AP Poll released prior to game. All times are in Central Time.

=== Week 8 ===
Date	Time	Visiting team	Home team	Site	TV	Result	Attendance	Ref.
October 20	6:30 p.m.	No. 14 **Coastal Carolina**	**Appalachian State**	Kidd Brewer Stadium • Boone, NC	ESPN2	**APPST** 30–27	31,061	
October 21	6:30 p.m.	**Louisiana**	**Arkansas State**	Centennial Bank Stadium • Jonesboro, AR	ESPNU	**ULL** 28–27	7,138	
October 23	1:00 p.m.	**Texas State**	**Georgia State**	Center Parc Stadium • Atlanta, GA	ESPN+	**GSU** 28–16	16,779	
October 23	6:00 p.m.	**South Alabama**	**Louisiana–Monroe**	Malone Stadium • Monroe, LA	ESPN3	**ULM** 41–31	11,723	
^{#}Rankings from AP Poll released prior to game. All times are in Central Time.

=== Week 9 ===
Date	Time	Visiting team	Home team	Site	TV	Result	Attendance	Ref.
October 28	6:30 p.m.	**Troy**	No. 24 **Coastal Carolina**	Brooks Stadium • Conway, SC	ESPN2	**CCU** 35–28	11,689	
October 30	11:00 a.m.	**Texas State**	**Louisiana**	Cajun Field • Lafayette, LA	ESPNU	**ULL** 45–0	28,794	
October 30	2:30 p.m.	**Louisiana–Monroe**	**Appalachian State**	Kidd Brewer Stadium • Boone, NC	ESPN+	**APPST** 59–28	29,321	
October 30	4:00 p.m.	**Arkansas State**	**South Alabama**	Hancock Whitney Stadium • Mobile, AL	ESPN+	**USA** 31–13	15,043	
October 30	5:00 p.m.	**Georgia State**	**Georgia Southern**	Allen E. Paulson Stadium • Statesboro, GA (rivalry)	ESPN+	**GSU** 21–14	17,843	
^{#}Rankings from AP Poll released prior to game. All times are in Central Time.

=== Week 10 ===
Date	Time	Visiting team	Home team	Site	TV	Result	Attendance	Ref.
November 4	6:30 p.m.	**Georgia State**	No. 24 **Louisiana**	Cajun Field • Lafayette, LA	ESPN	**ULL** 21–17	16,007	
November 6	1:00 p.m.	**Appalachian State**	**Arkansas State**	Centennial Bank Stadium • Jonesboro, AR	ESPN+	**APPST** 48–14	9,762	
November 6	2:00 p.m.	**Louisiana–Monroe**	**Texas State**	Bobcat Stadium • San Marcos, TX	ESPN+	**TXST** 27–19	16,237	
November 6	2:30 p.m.	**South Alabama**	**Troy**	Veterans Memorial Stadium • Troy, AL (Battle for the Belt)	ESPN+	**TROY** 31–24	26,211	
November 6	5:00 p.m.	No. 21 **Coastal Carolina**	**Georgia Southern**	Allen E. Paulson Stadium • Statesboro, GA	ESPN+	**CCU** 28–8	12,875	
^{#}Rankings from AP Poll released prior to game. All times are in Central Time.

=== Week 11 ===
Date	Time	Visiting team	Home team	Site	TV	Result	Attendance	Ref.
November 13	1:00 p.m.	**Georgia State**	No. 22 **Coastal Carolina**	Brooks Stadium • Conway, SC	ESPN+	**GSU** 42–40	16,744	
November 13	1:30 p.m.	**South Alabama**	**Appalachian State**	Kidd Brewer Stadium • Boone, NC	ESPN+	**APPST** 31–7	29,348	
November 13	2:00 p.m.	**Georgia Southern**	**Texas State**	Bobcat Stadium • San Marcos, TX	ESPN+	**GASO** 38–30	15,896	
November 13	2:30 p.m.	No. 24 **Louisiana**	**Troy**	Veterans Memorial Stadium • Troy, AL	ESPN+	**ULL** 35–21	24,738	
November 13	4:00 p.m.	**Arkansas State**	**Louisiana–Monroe**	Malone Stadium • Monroe, LA	ESPN+	**ARKST** 27–24	12,010	
^{#}Rankings from AP Poll released prior to game. All times are in Central Time.

=== Week 12 ===
Date	Time	Visiting team	Home team	Site	TV	Result	Attendance	Ref.
November 20	12:00 p.m.	**Texas State**	**Coastal Carolina**	Brooks Stadium • Conway, SC	ESPN+	**CCU** 35–21	10,386	
November 20	1:00 p.m.	**Arkansas State**	**Georgia State**	Center Parc Stadium • Atlanta, GA	ESPN3	**GSU** 28–20	14,273	
November 20	2:30 p.m.	**Appalachian State**	**Troy**	Veterans Memorial Stadium • Troy, AL	ESPN+	**APPST** 45–7	18,523	
November 20	3:00 p.m.	No. 14 BYU	**Georgia Southern**	Allen E. Paulson Stadium • Statesboro, GA	ESPN+	**L** 17–34	20,862	
November 20	3:00 p.m.	No. 22 **Louisiana**	Liberty	Williams Stadium • Lynchburg, VA	ESPNU	**W** 42–14	15,564	
November 20	6:30 p.m.	**South Alabama**	Tennessee	Neyland Stadium • Knoxville, TN	ESPNU	**L** 14–60	75,203	
November 20	8:00 p.m.	**Louisiana–Monroe**	LSU	Tiger Stadium • Baton Rouge, LA	ESPN2	**L** 14–27	92,790	
^{#}Rankings from AP Poll released prior to game. All times are in Central Time.

=== Week 13 ===
Date	Time	Visiting team	Home team	Site	TV	Result	Attendance	Ref.
November 26	2:30 p.m.	**Coastal Carolina**	**South Alabama**	Hancock Whitney Stadium • Mobile, AL	ESPN+	**CCU** 27–21 ^{OT}	13,242	
November 27	1:00 p.m.	**Texas State**	**Arkansas State**	Centennial Bank Stadium • Jonesboro, AR	ESPN+	**TXST** 24–22	3,116	
November 27	1:00 p.m.	**Troy**	**Georgia State**	Center Parc Stadium • Atlanta, GA	ESPN+	**GSU** 37–10	13,875	
November 27	1:30 p.m.	**Georgia Southern**	**Appalachian State**	Kidd Brewer Stadium • Boone, NC (rivalry)	ESPN+	**APPST** 27–3	28,005	
November 27	3:00 p.m.	**Louisiana–Monroe**	No. 23 **Louisiana**	Cajun Field • Lafayette, LA (Battle on the Bayou)	ESPNU	**ULL** 21–16	18,447	
^{#}Rankings from AP Poll released prior to game. All times are in Central Time.

=== Championship Game ===
==== Week Fifteen (Sun Belt Championship Game) ====
Date	Time	Visiting team	Home team	Site	TV	Result	Attendance	Ref.
December 4	2:30 p.m.	**Appalachian State**	**Louisiana**	Cajun Field • Lafayette, LA	ESPN	**ULL** 24–16	31,014	
^{#}Rankings from AP Poll released prior to game. All times are in Central Time.

== Postseason ==
=== Bowl Games ===
Legend
Sun Belt win
Sun Belt loss

Bowl game	Date	Site	Television	Time (CST)	Sun Belt team	Opponent	Score	Attendance
Cure Bowl	December 17	Exploria Stadium • Orlando, FL	ESPN2	5:00 p.m.	Coastal Carolina	Northern Illinois	W 47–41	9,784
Boca Raton Bowl	December 18	FAU Stadium • Boca Raton, FL	ESPN	10:00 a.m.	Appalachian State	Western Kentucky	L 38–59	15,429
New Orleans Bowl	December 18	Caesars Superdome • New Orleans, LA	ESPN	8:15 p.m.	Louisiana	Marshall	W 36–21	21,642
Camellia Bowl	December 25	Cramton Bowl • Montgomery, AL	ESPN	1:30 p.m.	Georgia State	Ball State	W 51–20	N/A

== Sun Belt records vs other conferences ==
2021–2022 records against non-conference foes:

Power 5 Conferences	Record
ACC	0–2
Big Ten	0–0
Big 12	1–2
Pac-12	0–1
BYU/Notre Dame	0–1
SEC	0–6
Power 5 Total	1–12
Group of 5 Conferences	Record
American	1–2
C–USA	5–1
Independents (Excluding BYU and Notre Dame)	3–2
MAC	3–1
Mountain West	0–0
Group of 5 Total	12–6
FCS Opponents	Record
Football Championship Subdivision	8–1
Total Non-Conference Record	21–19

=== Sun Belt vs Power 5 matchups ===
This is a list of games the Sun Belt has scheduled versus power conference teams (ACC, Big 10, Big 12, Pac-12, BYU, Notre Dame and SEC). All rankings are from the current AP Poll at the time of the game.

Date	Conference	Visitor	Home	Site	Score
September 4	SEC	Louisiana–Monroe	Kentucky	Kroger Field • Lexington, KY	L 10–45
September 4	Big 12	No. 23 Louisiana	No. 21 Texas	Darrell K Royal–Texas Memorial Stadium • Austin, TX	L 18–38
September 4	Big 12	Baylor	Texas State	Bobcat Stadium • San Marcos, TX	L 20–29
September 10	Big 12	Kansas	No. 17 Coastal Carolina	Brooks Stadium • Conway, SC	W 49–22
September 11	ACC	Appalachian State	No. 22 Miami (FL)	Hard Rock Stadium • Miami Gardens, FL	L 23–25
September 11	ACC	Georgia State	No. 24 North Carolina	Kenan Memorial Stadium • Chapel Hill, NC	L 17–59
September 18	SEC	Georgia Southern	No. 20 Arkansas	Donald W. Reynolds Razorback Stadium • Fayetteville, AR	L 10–45
September 18	Pac-12	Arkansas State	Washington	Husky Stadium • Seattle, WA	L 3–52
September 25	SEC	Georgia State	No. 23 Auburn	Jordan–Hare Stadium • Auburn, AL	L 24–34
October 2	SEC	Troy	South Carolina	Williams–Brice Stadium • Columbia, SC	L 14–23
November 20	SEC	Louisiana-Monroe	LSU	Tiger Stadium • Baton Rouge, LA	L 14–27
November 20	SEC	South Alabama	Tennessee	Neyland Stadium • Knoxville, TN	L 14–60
November 20	Independent	No. 14 BYU	Georgia Southern	Allen E. Paulson Stadium • Statesboro, GA	L 17–34

=== Sun Belt vs Group of Five matchups ===
The following games include Sun Belt teams competing against teams from the American, C-USA, MAC, or Mountain West.

Date	Conference	Visitor	Home	Site	Score
September 2	American	East Carolina	Appalachian State	Bank of America Stadium • Charlotte, NC	W 33–19
September 4	C-USA	Southern Miss	South Alabama	Hancock Whitney Stadium • Mobile, AL	W 31–7
September 11	C-USA	Georgia Southern	Florida Atlantic	FAU Stadium • Boca Raton, FL	L 6–38
September 11	MAC	South Alabama	Bowling Green	Doyt Perry Stadium • Bowling Green, OH	W 22–19
September 11	C-USA	Texas State	FIU	Riccardo Silva Stadium • Miami, FL	W 23–17 ^{OT}
September 11	American	Memphis	Arkansas State	Centennial Bank Stadium • Jonesboro, AR	L 50–55
September 16	MAC	Ohio	Louisiana	Cajun Field • Lafayette, LA	W 49–14
September 18	MAC	No. 16 Coastal Carolina	Buffalo	UB Stadium • Buffalo, NY	W 28–25
September 18	C-USA	Charlotte	Georgia State	Center Parc Stadium • Atlanta, GA	W 20–9
September 18	C-USA	Troy	Southern Miss	M. M. Roberts Stadium • Hattiesburg, MS	W 21–9
September 23	C-USA	Marshall	Appalachian State	Kidd Brewer Stadium • Boone, NC	W 31–30
September 25	American	Arkansas State	Tulsa	H. A. Chapman Stadium • Tulsa, OK	L 34–41
September 25	MAC	Texas State	Eastern Michigan	Rynearson Stadium • Ypsilanti, MI	L 21–59

=== Sun Belt vs FBS independents matchups ===
The following games include Sun Belt teams competing against FBS Independents, which includes Army, Liberty, New Mexico State, UConn, or UMass.

Date	Conference	Visitor	Home	Site	Score
September 4	Independent	Army	Georgia State	Center Parc Stadium • Atlanta, GA	L 10–43
September 11	Independent	Liberty	Troy	Veterans Memorial Stadium • Troy, AL	L 13–21
September 25	Independent	UMass	No. 17 Coastal Carolina	Brooks Stadium • Conway, SC	W 53–3
October 16	Independent	Liberty	Louisiana–Monroe	Malone Stadium • Monroe, LA	W 31-28
November 20	Independent	No. 22 Louisiana	Liberty	Williams Stadium • Lynchburg, VA	W 42–14

=== Sun Belt vs FCS matchups ===
Date	Visitor	Home	Site	Score
September 2	The Citadel	No. 22 Coastal Carolina	Brooks Stadium • Conway, SC	W 52–14
September 4	Gardner–Webb	Georgia Southern	Allen E. Paulson Stadium • Statesboro, GA	W 30–25
September 4	Central Arkansas	Arkansas State	Centennial Bank Stadium • Jonesboro, AR	W 40–21
September 4	Southern	Troy	Veterans Memorial Stadium • Troy, AL	W 55–3
September 11	Nicholls	Louisiana	Cajun Field • Lafayette, LA	W 27–24
September 18	Elon	Appalachian State	Kidd Brewer Stadium • Boone, NC	W 44–10
September 18	Incarnate Word	Texas State	Bobcat Stadium • San Marcos, TX	L 34–42
September 18	Jackson State	Louisiana–Monroe	Malone Stadium • Monroe, LA	W 12–7
September 18	Alcorn State	South Alabama	Hancock Whitney Stadium • Mobile, AL	W 28–21

== Awards and honors ==
=== Player of the week honors ===
Week	Offensive			Defensive			Special Teams		
Week	Player	Team	Position	Player	Team	Position	Player	Team	Position
Week 1 (September 6)	Corey Rucker	Arkansas State	WR	Zion Williams	Troy	CB	Britton Williams	Georgia Southern	K
Week 2 (September 13)	Reese White	Coastal Carolina	RB	Josaiah Stewart	Coastal Carolina	DL	Diego Guajardo	South Alabama	K
Week 3 (September 20)	Montrell Johnson	Louisiana	RB	Javon Solomon	Troy	DL	Calum Sutherland	Louisiana–Monroe	K
Week 4 (September 27)	Nate Noel	Appalachian State	RB	Ja'Cquez Williams	Louisiana–Monroe	LB	Alan Lamar	Arkansas State	RS
Week 5 (October 4)	Logan Wright	Georgia Southern	RB	D'Marco Jackson	Appalachian State	LB	Chris Smith	Louisiana	RS
Week 6 (October 11)	Isaiah Likely	Coastal Carolina	TE	Sione Tupou	Texas State	LB	Brooks Buce	Troy	K
Week 7 (October 18)	Jake Bentley	South Alabama	QB	Carlton Martial	Troy	LB	Calum Sutherland (2)	Louisiana–Monroe	K
Week 8 (October 25)	Chandler Rogers	Louisiana–Monroe	QB	Demetrius Taylor	Appalachian State	DL	Chandler Staton	Appalachian State	K
Week 9 (November 1)	Grayson McCall	Coastal Carolina	QB	Trey Cobb	Appalachian State	LB	Alan Lamar (2)	Arkansas State	RS
Week 10 (November 8)	Tyler Vitt	Texas State	QB	Steven Jones Jr.	Appalachian State	DB	Alex Spillum	Coastal Carolina	S
Week 11 (November 15)	Darren Grainger	Georgia State	QB	Eldrick Robinson II	Georgia Southern	LB	Blake Grupe	Arkansas State	K
Week 12 (November 22)	Grayson McCall (2)	Coastal Carolina	QB	Chauncey Manac	Louisiana	LB	Dalen Cambre	Louisiana	WR
Week 13 (November 29)	Shermari Jones	Coastal Carolina	RB	Silas Kelly	Coastal Carolina	LB	Jalen Virgil	Appalachian State	RS

=== Sun Belt individual awards ===
The following individuals received postseason honors as voted by the Sun Belt Conference football coaches at the end of the season.

Award	Player	School
Player of the Year	Grayson McCall	Coastal Carolina
Offensive Player of the Year	Jalen Tolbert	South Alabama
Defensive Player of the Year	D'Marco Jackson	Appalachian State
Freshman Player of the Year	Montrell Johnson Jr.	Louisiana
Newcomer of the Year	Chase Brice	Appalachian State
Coach of the Year	Billy Napier	Louisiana

=== All-Conference Teams ===
The following players were selected as part of the Sun Belt's All-Conference Teams.

Position	Player	Team
First Team Offense
WR	Corey Sutton	Appalachian State
WR	Jaivon Heiligh	Coastal Carolina
WR	Jalen Tolbert	South Alabama
OL	Max Mitchell	Louisiana
OL	Cooper Hodges	Appalachian State
OL	Shamarious Gilmore	Georgia State
OL	O'Cyrus Torrence	Louisiana
OL	Baer Hunter	Appalachian State
TE	Isaiah Likely	Coastal Carolina
QB	Grayson McCall	Coastal Carolina
RB	Nate Noel	Appalachian State
RB	Shermari Jones	Coastal Carolina
First Team Defense
DL	Josaiah Stewart	Coastal Carolina
DL	Demetrius Taylor	Appalachian State
DL	Javon Solomon	Troy
DL	C. J. Brewer	Coastal Carolina
LB	D'Marco Jackson	Appalachian State
LB	Carlton Martial	Troy
LB	Silas Kelly	Coastal Carolina
DB	Steven Jones Jr.	Appalachian State
DB	Darrell Luter Jr.	South Alabama
DB	Shaun Jolly	Appalachian State
DB	Antavious Lane	State
DB	D'Jordan Strong	Coastal Carolina
First Team Specialists
K	Chandler Staton	Appalachian State
P	Rhys Byrns	Louisiana
AP	Chris Smith	Louisiana
KRS	Alan Lamar	Arkansas State

Position	Player	Team
Second Team Offense
WR	Malik Williams	Appalachian State
WR	Thomas Hennigan	Appalachian State
WR	Corey Rucker	Arkansas State
OL	Malik Sumter	Georgia State
OL	Shane Vallot	Louisiana
OL	Dylan Bradshaw	Troy
OL	Willie Lampkin	Coastal Carolina
OL	Austin Stidham	Troy
TE	Roger Carter	Georgia State
QB	Levi Lewis	Louisiana
RB	Montrell Johnson Jr.	Louisiana
RB	Camerun Peoples	Appalachian State
Second Team Defense
DL	Jeffrey Gunter	Coastal Carolina
DL	Kivon Bennett	Arkansas State
DL	Zi'Yon Hill	Louisiana
DL	CJ Wright	Georgia Southern
DL	Will Choloh	Troy
LB	Chauncey Manac	Louisiana
LB	Trey Cobb	Appalachian State
LB	Lorenzo McCaskill	Louisiana
DB	Keith Gallmon Jr.	South Alabama
DB	Percy Butler	Louisiana
DB	Kaiden Smith	Appalachian State
DB	Eric Garror	Louisiana
Second Team Specialists
K	Blake Grupe	Arkansas State
P	Anthony Beck II	Georgia Southern
AP	Alan Lamar	Arkansas State
KRS	Jalen Virgil	Appalachian State

Position	Player	Team
Third Team Offense
WR	Tez Johnson	Troy
WR	TeVailance Hunt	Arkansas State
WR	Boogie Knight	Louisiana–Monroe
OL	Anderson Hardy	Appalachian State
OL	Trey Carter	Coastal Carolina
OL	Dalton Cooper	Texas State
OL	Pat Bartlett	Georgia State
OL	Khalil Crowder	Georgia Southern
TE	Lincoln Sefcik	South Alabama
QB	Chase Brice	Appalachian State
RB	Chris Smith	Louisiana
RB	Tucker Gregg	Georgia State
Third Team Defense
DL	Tayland Humphrey	Louisiana
DL	Richard Jibunor	Troy
DL	Dontae Wilson	Georgia State
DL	Andre Jones Jr.	Louisiana
LB	Nick Hampton	Appalachian State
LB	Eldrick Robinson II	Georgia Southern
LB	Blake Carroll	Georgia State
DB	Quavian White	Georgia State
DB	Anthony Wilson	Georgia Southern
DB	Alex Spillum	Coastal Carolina
DB	Mekhi Garner	Louisiana
DB	TJ Harris	Troy
Third Team Specialists
K	Calum Sutherland	Louisiana–Monroe
P	Ryan Hanson	Arkansas State
AP	Caleb Spurlin	Appalachian State
KRS	Jaivon Heiligh	Coastal Carolina

=== All-Americans ===
The 2021 College Football All-America Teams are composed of the following College Football All-American first teams chosen by the following selector organizations: Associated Press (AP), Football Writers Association of America (FWAA), American Football Coaches Association (AFCA), Walter Camp Foundation (WCFF), The Sporting News (TSN), Sports Illustrated (SI), USA Today (USAT) ESPN, CBS Sports (CBS), FOX Sports (FOX) College Football News (CFN), Bleacher Report (BR), Scout.com, Phil Steele (PS), SB Nation (SB), Athlon Sports, Pro Football Focus (PFF) and Yahoo! Sports (Yahoo!).

Currently, the NCAA compiles consensus all-America teams in the sports of Division I-FBS football and Division I men's basketball using a point system computed from All-America teams named by coaches associations or media sources. The system consists of three points for a first-team honor, two points for second-team honor, and one point for third-team honor. Honorable mention and fourth team or lower recognitions are not accorded any points. Football consensus teams are compiled by position and the player accumulating the most points at each position is named first team consensus all-American. Currently, the NCAA recognizes All-Americans selected by the AP, AFCA, FWAA, TSN, and the WCFF to determine Consensus and Unanimous All-Americans. Any player named to the First Team by all five of the NCAA-recognized selectors is deemed a Unanimous All-American.

Position	Player	School	Selector	Unanimous	Consensus
First Team All-Americans
DB	Steven Jones Jr.	Appalachian State	FWAA		

Position	Player	School	Selector	Unanimous	Consensus
Second Team All-Americans
OL	Max Mitchell	Louisiana	CBS, TSN, USAT, WCFF		
TE	Isaiah Likely	Coastal Carolina	FWAA, WCFF		
DB	Steven Jones Jr.	Appalachian State	WCFF		

Position	Player	School	Selector	Unanimous	Consensus
Third Team All-Americans
OL	Max Mitchell	Louisiana	AP		

== NFL draft ==
The following list includes all Sun Belt players who were drafted in the 2022 NFL draft.

Player	Position	School	Draft Round	Round Pick	Overall Pick	Team
Jalen Tolbert	WR	South Alabama	3	24	88	Dallas Cowboys
Max Mitchell	OT	Louisiana	4	6	111	New York Jets
Percy Butler	SS	Louisiana	4	8	113	Washington Commanders
Isaiah Likely	TE	Coastal Carolina	4	34	139	Baltimore Ravens
D'Marco Jackson	LB	Appalachian State	5	18	161	New Orleans Saints
Jeffrey Gunter	DE	Coastal Carolina	7	31	252	Cincinnati Bengals
