= D'Marco Jackson =

American football player (born 1998)

- Jackson in 2026

No. 48 – Chicago Bears
- Position: Linebacker
- Roster status: Active

Personal information
- Born: July 20, 1998 (age 28); Spartanburg, South Carolina, U.S.
- Listed height: 6 ft 1 in (1.85 m)
- Listed weight: 233 lb (106 kg)

Career information
- High school: Broome (Spartanburg)
- College: Appalachian State (2017–2021)
- NFL draft: 2022: 5th round, 161st overall pick

Career history
- New Orleans Saints (2022–2024); Chicago Bears (2025–present)

Awards and highlights
- Sun Belt Defensive Player of the Year (2021); First-team All-Sun Belt (2021); Second-team All-Sun Belt (2020)

Career NFL statistics as of 2025
- Total tackles: 0
- Sacks: 0
- Fumble recoveries: 0
- Interceptions: 1
- Pass deflections: 0
- Defensive touchdowns: 0
- Stats at Pro Football Reference

D'Marco Carnelius Jackson (born July 20, 1998) is an American professional football linebacker for the Chicago Bears of the National Football League (NFL). He played college football for the Appalachian State Mountaineers.

== Early life ==
Jackson grew up in Spartanburg, South Carolina and attended Broome High School. As a senior, Jackson was a finalist for the South Carolina's Mr. Football award. As a senior, Jackson recorded 78 tackles, 16 tackles for loss and a sack. He was listed as a two-star recruit and the 61st best player in South Carolina by 247Sports.com. Jackson committed to Appalachian State University over offers from Charlotte and Georgia Southern.

== College career ==
Jackson redshirted his first year on campus and appeared in all 13 games as a redshirt freshman, recording 25 tackles and two tackles for loss. The following season, Jackson had 60 tackles and three sacks. In his junior season, he tallied 87 tackles, 2.5 sacks, two interceptions, and he was named to the second-team All-Sun Belt Conference. Both of Jackson's interceptions came in a 45–17 victory over Arkansas State. Jackson played in all 14 games his senior season. He would have a career high 119 tackles and six sacks, as well as a forced fumble. Jackson was named to the first-team All-Sun Belt and the Sun Belt Defensive Player of the Year. Jackson would play in 53 games with the Mountaineers, were they amassed a record of 43–10.

== Professional career ==
Pre-draft measurables
Height	Weight	Arm length	Hand span	Wingspan	40-yard dash	10-yard split	20-yard split	20-yard shuttle	Three-cone drill	Vertical jump	Broad jump	Bench press
6 ft 0 3/4 in (1.85 m)	233 lb (106 kg)	32 1/2 in (0.83 m)	9 1/4 in (0.23 m)	6 ft 5 7/8 in (1.98 m)	4.55 s	1.53 s	2.62 s	4.29 s	7.19 s	33.0 in (0.84 m)	10 ft 5 in (3.18 m)	19 reps
All values from NFL Combine/Pro Day

=== New Orleans Saints ===
Jackson was selected by the New Orleans Saints in the fifth round (161st overall) of the 2022 NFL draft. He was placed on injured reserve on August 9, 2022.

On August 26, 2025, Jackson was waived by the Saints as part of final roster cuts.

=== Chicago Bears ===
On August 27, 2025, Jackson was claimed off waivers by the Chicago Bears.

Although primarily a special teams player for the 2025 season, Jackson became the Bears' starting middle linebacker for their Week 12 game against the Pittsburgh Steelers due to injuries. As the defense's play caller, he led the Bears in tackles with 15 as they won 31–28. In Week 15, Jackson recorded his first career sack and interception off the Cleveland Browns' Shedeur Sanders; he was named NFC Defensive Player of the Week, the first Bears linebacker to receive the honor since Danny Trevathan in 2018.

On March 9, 2026, Jackson re-signed with the Bears on a two-year, $7.5 million contract. In the Week 7 victory over the New England Patriots, Jackson intercepted Drake Maye in the end zone.

== Personal life ==
Jackson is the cousin of former NFL running back Maurice Morris.
