= Jalen Tolbert =

American football player (born 1999)

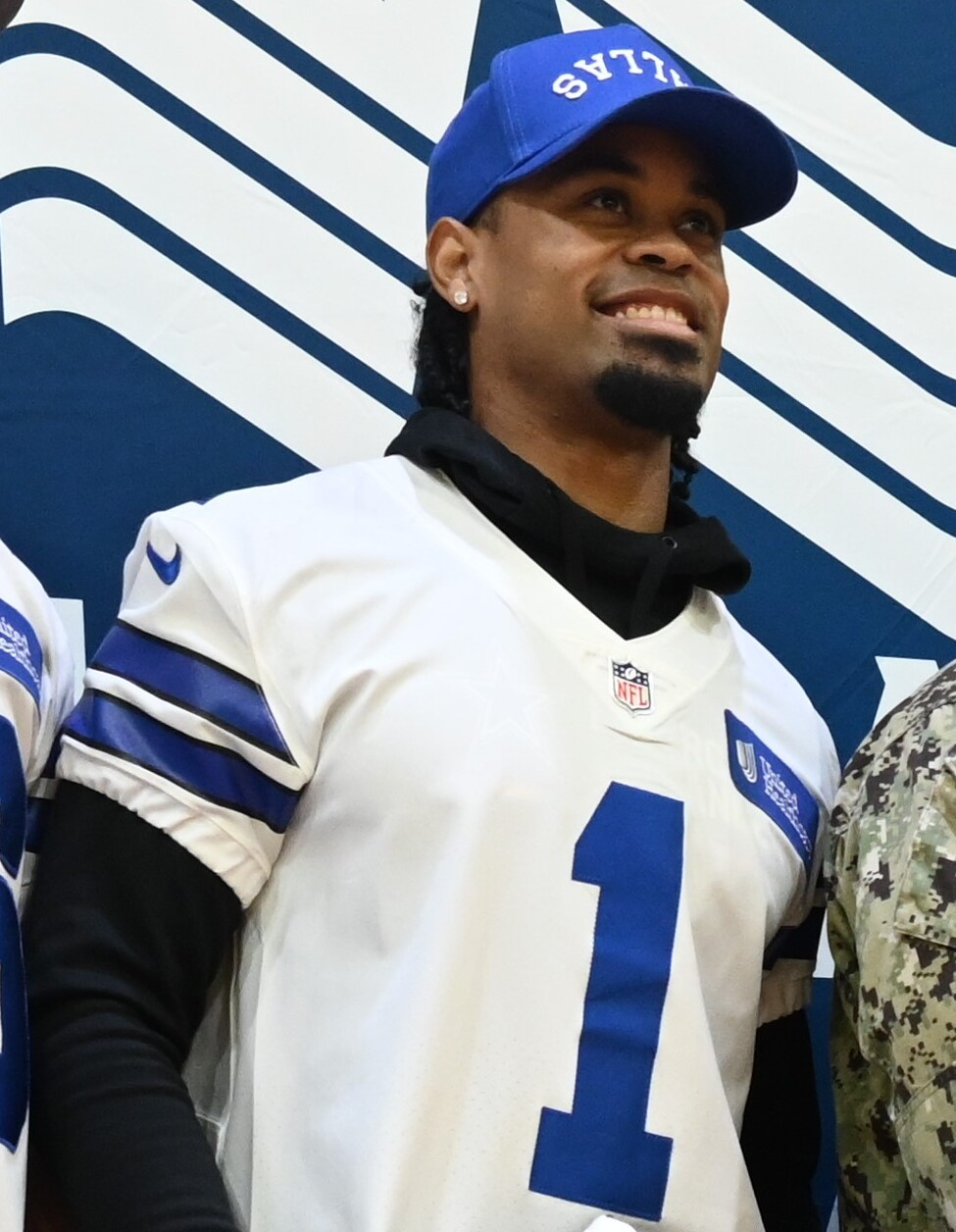
- Tolbert with the Dallas Cowboys in 2024

No. 1 – Miami Dolphins
- Positions: Wide receiver, return specialist
- Roster status: Active

Personal information
- Born: February 27, 1999 (age 27); Mobile, Alabama, U.S.
- Listed height: 6 ft 1 in (1.85 m)
- Listed weight: 195 lb (88 kg)

Career information
- High school: McGill–Toolen (Mobile)
- College: South Alabama (2017–2021)
- NFL draft: 2022: 3rd round, 88th overall pick

Career history
- Dallas Cowboys (2022–2025); Miami Dolphins (2026–present)

Awards and highlights
- Sun Belt Offensive Player of the Year (2021); 2× First-team All-Sun Belt (2020, 2021)

Career NFL statistics as of Week 7, 2026
- Receptions: 92
- Receiving yards: 1,115
- Receiving touchdowns: 10
- Stats at Pro Football Reference

Jalen Curtis Tolbert (born February 27, 1999) is an American professional football wide receiver and return specialist for the Miami Dolphins of the National Football League (NFL). He played college football for the South Alabama Jaguars and was selected by the Dallas Cowboys in the third round of the 2022 NFL draft.

== Early life ==
Tolbert was born on February 27, 1999, in Mobile, Alabama. He attended McGill–Toolen Catholic High School, where he played baseball, basketball, and football. Tolbert did not become a starter until his senior year, where he finished the season with 37 receptions for 696 yards and nine touchdowns. He was rated a two-star recruit and initially committed to play college football at Jacksonville State, before choosing to attend the University of South Alabama.

== College career ==
Tolbert redshirted his true freshman season with the Jaguars after suffering a knee injury in preseason training camp. In the 2019 season, he entered the starting lineup as a redshirt sophomore and finished the season with 27 receptions for 521 yards (leading the conference with 19.3 yards per reception) and six touchdowns. In the 2020 season, Tolbert was named first-team All-Sun Belt Conference as a redshirt junior after catching 64 passes for 1,085 yards (both school records) and eight touchdowns (tied the school record). Against Arkansas State, he set a school record with 252 yards on ten receptions and three touchdowns. In 2021, he was again named first-team All-Sun Belt and the conference's Offensive Player of the Year (South Alabama's first) after surpassing his own school records and leading the conference in receptions (82), receiving yards (1,474) and yards per reception (18.0), while scoring eight touchdowns.

=== College statistics ===
Year	Team	GP	Receiving			
Year	Team	GP	Rec	Yds	Avg	TD
2017	South Alabama	0	DNP			
2018	South Alabama	5	5	60	12.0	0
2019	South Alabama	12	27	521	19.3	6
2020	South Alabama	11	64	1,085	17.0	8
2021	South Alabama	12	82	1,474	18.0	8
Career		40	171	3,140	17.6	22

== Professional career ==
Pre-draft measurables
Height	Weight	Arm length	Hand span	Wingspan	40-yard dash	10-yard split	20-yard split	20-yard shuttle	Three-cone drill	Vertical jump	Broad jump
6 ft 1 1/8 in (1.86 m)	194 lb (88 kg)	32 1/4 in (0.82 m)	10 in (0.25 m)	6 ft 4 3/8 in (1.94 m)	4.49 s	1.54 s	2.58 s	4.24 s	7.08 s	36.0 in (0.91 m)	10 ft 3 in (3.12 m)
All values from NFL Combine/Pro Day

=== Dallas Cowboys ===
Tolbert was selected by the Dallas Cowboys in the third round (88th overall) of the 2022 NFL draft. He was acquired to help ease the impact of losing Amari Cooper in a trade and to lessen the load from the injured Michael Gallup. As a rookie, the jump to the NFL combined with being asked to play inside and outside at wide receiver, proved to be too much and he struggled. He appeared in only eight games with one start and tallied 2 receptions for 12 yards. He was declared inactive in the first 2 contests of the season and in both playoff games.

In 2023, he was the team's fourth receiver behind CeeDee Lamb, Brandin Cooks and Gallup. He appeared in 17 games with 6 starts, posting 22 receptions for 268 yards, 2 touchdowns and 2 special teams tackles. In Week 4 against the New England Patriots, he had 4 receptions for 55 yards and one special team tackle. In Week 9 against the Philadelphia Eagles, Tolbert scored his first career touchdown on a seven-yard reception and also had 32-yard reception. In Week 16 against the Miami Dolphins, he had 2 receptions for 51 yards, including a 45-yard catch.

In 2024, he became a starter at wide receiver opposite Lamb, recording 17 games with 15 starts, 49 receptions (third on the team), 610 receiving yards (second on the team) and 7 receiving touchdowns (led the team). In Week 5 against the Pittsburgh Steelers on Sunday Night Football, he had the highlight of his Cowboys career, when he caught the game-winning touchdown on a 4-yard pass with 20 seconds remaining in a 20–17 road victory, to go along with 7 catches for 87 yards. In the season finale against the Washington Commanders, he had 4 receptions for 98 yards.

In 2025, he appeared to be ready for a bigger jump, only to take a back seat after the acquisition of George Pickens and being passed on the depth chart by second-year player Ryan Flournoy. In Week 4 against the Green Bay Packers, he had a 34-yard critical reception in overtime, that put the ball at Green Bay's 5-yard line, resulting in a field goal for the lead, with the Packers later taking possession and ending the game with a 40–40 tie. Although he started 8 games, Tolbert was mostly an afterthought in the passing game, registering 18 receptions for 203 yards and one touchdown, only making 8 catches after the fourth game of the season. He was declared inactive in 4 of the Cowboys final 6 contests.

=== Miami Dolphins ===
On March 16, 2026, Tolbert signed a one-year contract with the Miami Dolphins.

=== Professional statistics ===
==== Regular season ====
Legend
**Bold**	Career high

Year	Team	Games		Receiving					Fumbles	
Year	Team	GP	GS	Rec	Yds	Avg	Lng	TD	Fum	Lost
2022	DAL	8	1	2	12	6.0	8	0	0	0
2023	DAL	**17**	6	22	268	12.1	45	2	**1**	0
2024	DAL	**17**	**15**	**49**	**610**	**12.4**	**48**	**7**	0	0
2025	DAL	13	8	18	203	11.3	35	1	0	0
Career		55	30	91	1,093	12.0	48	10	1	0

==== Postseason ====
Legend
**Bold**	Career high

Year	Team	Games		Receiving					Fumbles	
Year	Team	GP	GS	Rec	Yds	Avg	Lng	TD	Fum	Lost
2023	DAL	0	0	0	0	0	0	0	0	0
Career		0	0	0	0	0.0	0	0	0	0
