= Nate Noel =

American football player (born 2002)

Profile
- Position: Running back

Personal information
- Born: May 4, 2002 (age 24); Miami, Florida, U.S.
- Listed height: 5 ft 8 in (1.73 m)
- Listed weight: 200 lb (91 kg)

Career information
- High school: Miami Northwestern Senior
- College: Appalachian State (2020–2023); Missouri (2024)
- NFL draft: 2025: undrafted

Career history
- Miami Dolphins (2025)*; Indianapolis Colts (2025)*; Birmingham Stallions (2026)*
- * Offseason or practice squad member only

Awards and highlights
- First-team All-Sun Belt (2021)
- Stats at Pro Football Reference

Nate Noel (born May 4, 2002) is an American professional football running back. He played college football for the Appalachian State Mountaineers and Missouri Tigers.

== Early life ==
Noel attended Miami Northwestern Senior High School in Miami, Florida, winning state titles in both track and football. He was rated as a three-star recruit and committed to play college football for the Appalachian State Mountaineers.

== College career ==
=== Appalachian State ===
As a freshman in 2020, Noel rushed 82 times for 510 yards and three touchdowns. In 2021, he had a breakout season leading the Sun Belt Conference, running for 1,126 yards and four touchdowns on 199 carries where for his performance he was named first-team all Sun Belt. In 2022, Noel notched 604 yards and six touchdowns on 87 carries. In 2023, he rushed for 834 yards and five touchdowns on 173 carries for the Mountaineers, while also hauling in 16 receptions for 86 yards. After the conclusion of the 2023 season, Noel entered his name into the NCAA transfer portal.

=== Missouri ===
Noel transferred to play for the Missouri Tigers. In week four of the 2024 season, Noel rushed 199 yards on 24 carries as helped the Tigers to a win over the Vanderbilt Commodores.

== Professional career ==
Pre-draft measurables
Height	Weight	Arm length	Hand span	40-yard dash	10-yard split	20-yard split	20-yard shuttle	Three-cone drill	Bench press
5 ft 7 7/8 in (1.72 m)	194 lb (88 kg)	29 3/8 in (0.75 m)	9 7/8 in (0.25 m)	4.52 s	1.59 s	2.57 s	4.38 s	7.21 s	16 reps
All values from Pro Day

=== Miami Dolphins ===
On May 9, 2025, Noel signed with the Miami Dolphins as an undrafted free agent after going unselected in the 2025 NFL draft. He was waived on July 28.

=== Indianapolis Colts ===
On August 9, 2025, Noel signed with the Indianapolis Colts. He was waived on August 25.

=== Birmingham Stallions ===
On January 14, 2026, Noel was drafted by the Birmingham Stallions. He was released on March 19.
