= Chase Brice =

American gridiron football player (born 1998)

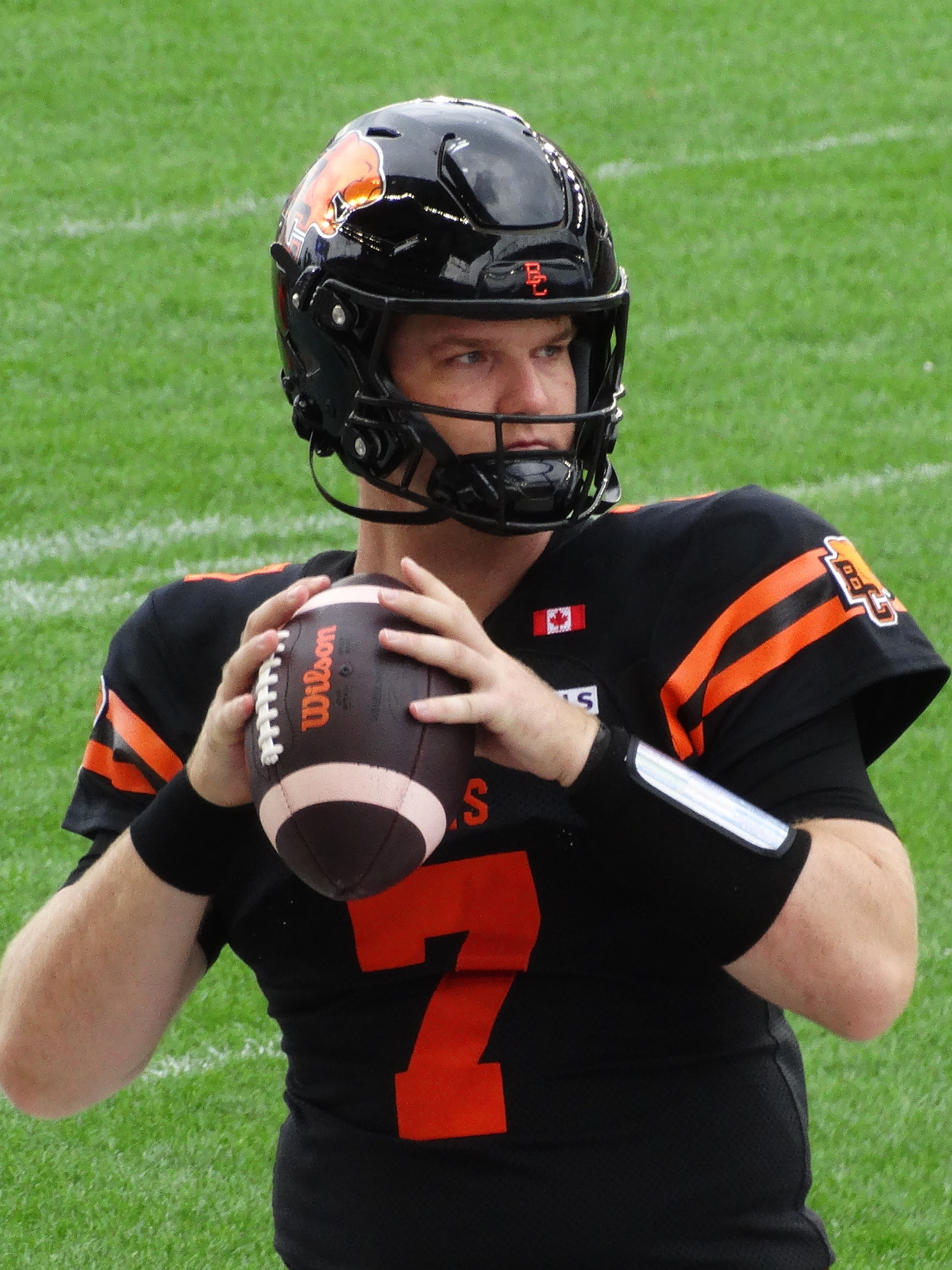
- Brice with the BC Lions in 2025

Profile
- Position: Quarterback

Personal information
- Born: January 27, 1998 (age 28); Grayson, Georgia, U.S.
- Listed height: 6 ft 2 in (1.88 m)
- Listed weight: 236 lb (107 kg)

Career information
- High school: Grayson (Loganville, Georgia)
- College: Clemson (2017–2019); Duke (2020); Appalachian State (2021–2022)
- NFL draft: 2023: undrafted

Career history
- BC Lions (2023–2026)

Awards and highlights
- CFP national champion (2018); Sun Belt Newcomer of the Year (2021); Third-team All-Sun Belt (2021)

Career CFL statistics as of 2025
- Passing completions: 25
- Passing attempts: 33
- Passing yards: 261
- TD–INT: 1–0
- Stats at CFL.ca

Chase Brice (born January 27, 1998) is an American professional football quarterback. He played college football at Clemson, Duke, and Appalachian State Mountaineers, winning a national championship at Clemson.

== College career ==
=== Clemson ===
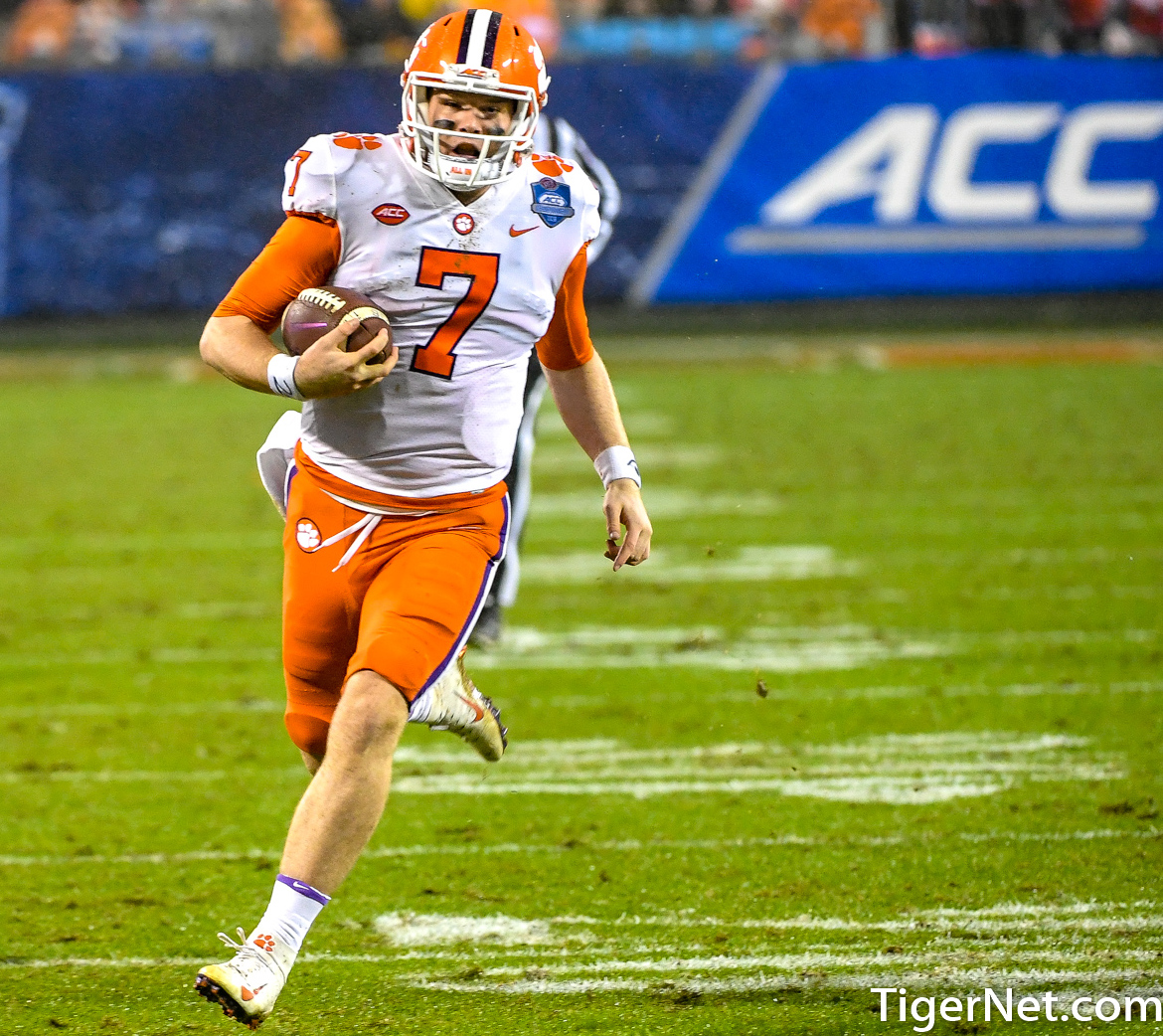
Brice with Clemson in 2018

Chase Brice was a Rivals and ESPN 4-star quarterback recruit in the high school class of 2017 and committed to Clemson. After redshirting his true freshman season, Brice entered the 2018 season as the third-string quarterback behind Kelly Bryant and Trevor Lawrence. He was bumped up to the backup role when Bryant opted to transfer out after losing the starting job to Lawrence. In his first game as the backup quarterback, he was thrust into game action after Lawrence left with a head injury in the second quarter, helping Clemson rally from a 10-point fourth quarter deficit to a 27–23 comeback win over Syracuse, with the go-ahead score happening on a 12-play, 94-yard drive. The win kept the then-No. 3 ranked Tigers in contention for a College Football Playoff berth, which they were able to secure as they won their second national championship in three seasons.

Brice spent 2019 as Lawrence's backup before opting to transfer to Duke before the 2020 season, citing the chance to work with Duke coach David Cutcliffe, who has gained a reputation for being one of the top quarterback coaches in football.

=== Duke ===
Brice entered Duke as a graduate transfer after earning a degree in Parks, Recreation, and Tourism Management from Clemson, granting him immediate eligibility. He was named the starting quarterback by Cutcliffe ahead of their season opener against Notre Dame, where he threw for 259 yards and rushed for a touchdown in what was a 27–13 loss for the Blue Devils. He started all 11 of Duke's games in 2020 but struggled with turnovers throughout the season after posting a touchdown-interception ratio of 10–15 as the Blue Devils went 2–9 on the season. Brice announced that he would transfer from Duke, his second transfer in as many seasons.

=== Appalachian State ===
Brice announced that he would transfer to Appalachian State for the 2021 season, enrolling for the spring semester as a graduate student. He won Sun Belt Newcomer of the Year in 2021.

== Professional career ==
Pre-draft measurables
Height	Weight	Arm length	Hand span	Wingspan	20-yard shuttle	Vertical jump	Broad jump
6 ft 2 3/8 in (1.89 m)	236 lb (107 kg)	30 3/4 in (0.78 m)	9 5/8 in (0.24 m)	6 ft 4 1/2 in (1.94 m)	4.52 s	27.0 in (0.69 m)	9 ft 1 in (2.77 m)
All values from Pro Day

On February 21, 2023, Brice was selected with the third overall pick in the 2023 USFL draft by the Houston Gamblers.

=== BC Lions ===
On June 4, 2023, Brice signed with the BC Lions of the Canadian Football League (CFL).

On February 2, 2026, Brice re-signed with the Lions, on a two-year contract extension. After three seasons with the Lions, Brice was released by the team on September 21.

== Career statistics ==
=== CFL ===
Year	Team	Games			Passing								Rushing			
Year	Team	GD	GS	Record	Cmp	Att	Pct	Yds	Y/A	TD	Int	Rtg	Att	Yds	Y/A	TD
2023	BC	2	0	—	DNP											
2024	BC	18	0	—	22	29	75.9	232	8.0	1	0	110.1	2	1	0.5	0
2025	BC	18	0	—	3	4	75.0	29	7.2	0	0	94.8	3	2	0.7	0
2026	BC	6	1	0–1	40	66	60.6	476	7.2	2	4	67.5	1	4	4.0	0
Career		44	1	0–1	65	99	65.7	737	7.4	3	4	81.1	6	7	1.2	0

=== College ===
Season	Team	Games			Passing								Rushing			
Season	Team	GP	GS	Record	Cmp	Att	Pct	Yds	Y/A	TD	Int	Rtg	Att	Yds	Avg	TD
2017	Clemson	Redshirt														
2018	Clemson	12	0	—	32	51	62.7	442	8.7	5	3	156.1	16	93	5.8	0
2019	Clemson	13	0	—	50	85	58.8	581	6.8	4	1	129.4	14	94	6.7	1
2020	Duke	11	11	2–9	193	352	54.8	2,170	6.2	10	15	107.5	91	93	1.0	1
2021	Appalachian State	14	14	10–4	242	390	62.1	3,337	8.6	27	11	151.1	71	151	2.1	3
2022	Appalachian State	12	12	6–6	219	349	62.8	2,921	8.4	27	6	155.1	71	117	1.6	4
Career		62	37	18−19	736	1,227	60.0	9,451	7.7	73	36	138.5	263	548	2.1	9

== Personal life ==
Brice's uncle is former Clemson special teams coordinator Mickey Conn.
