= 2021 Georgia Southern Eagles football team =

American college football season

2021 Georgia Southern Eagles football
- Conference: Sun Belt Conference
- East Division
- Record: 3–9 (2–6 Sun Belt)
- Head coach: Chad Lunsford (4th season; first 4 games); Kevin Whitley (interim; final 8 games)
- Offensive coordinator: Doug Ruse (3rd season)
- Offensive scheme: Pistol
- Defensive coordinator: Scot Sloan (4th season)
- Base defense: 3–4
- Home stadium: Paulson Stadium

2021 Sun Belt Conference football standings
	Conf.			Overall
Team	W		L	W		L
East Division
Appalachian State xy	7	–	1	10	–	4
Georgia State	6	–	2	8	–	5
Coastal Carolina	6	–	2	11	–	2
Troy	3	–	5	5	–	7
Georgia Southern	2	–	6	3	–	9
West Division
No. 16 Louisiana xy$	8	–	0	13	–	1
Texas State	3	–	5	4	–	8
Louisiana–Monroe	2	–	6	4	–	8
South Alabama	2	–	6	5	–	7
Arkansas State	1	–	7	2	–	10
Championship: Louisiana 24, Appalachian State 16
$ – Conference champion; x – Division champion/co-champions; y – Championship game participant; Rankings from AP Poll

The 2021 Georgia Southern Eagles football team represented Georgia Southern University during the 2021 NCAA Division I FBS football season. The Eagles played their home games at Paulson Stadium in Statesboro, Georgia, and competed in the East Division of the Sun Belt Conference. They were led by third-year head coach Chad Lunsford until he was dismissed mid-season following his third consecutive loss within the first four games of the season. Cornerbacks coach Kevin Whitley was tapped to serve as interim coach until a new head coach was hired by the university. Whitley was in his third year as cornerbacks coach and previously played for Georgia Southern as a four year starter from 1988 to 1991, helping to win two national titles for the Eagles. On November 2, 2021, Clay Helton, former head coach of the USC Trojans, was hired to become the next head coach for Georgia Southern, starting in the 2022 season.

== Preseason ==
=== Recruiting class ===
College recruiting information
Name	Hometown	School	Height	Weight	40^{‡}	Commit date
Derwin Burgess Jr. WR	Riverdale, GA	Riverdale HS	5 ft 11 in (1.80 m)	180 lb (82 kg)	–	
Derwin Burgess Jr. WR	Recruit ratings: Scout: Rivals: 247Sports: ESPN:					
Chas Collins; OL	Statesboro, GA	Bulloch Academy	6 ft 7 in (2.01 m)	270 lb (120 kg)	–	
Chas Collins; OL	Recruit ratings: Scout: Rivals: 247Sports: ESPN:					
Caleb Cook; OL	Brunswick, GA	Brunswick HS	6 ft 2 in (1.88 m)	275 lb (125 kg)	–	
Caleb Cook; OL	Recruit ratings: Scout: Rivals: 247Sports: ESPN:					
Tyrell Davis; DB	Harrisburg, NC	Hickory Ridge HS	6 ft 1 in (1.85 m)	185 lb (84 kg)	–	
Tyrell Davis; DB	Recruit ratings: Scout: Rivals: 247Sports: ESPN:					
Michael Edwards III; LB	Trussville, AL	Hewitt-Trussville HS	6 ft 1 in (1.85 m)	210 lb (95 kg)	–	
Michael Edwards III; LB	Recruit ratings: Scout: Rivals: 247Sports: ESPN:					
James Graham; QB	Fitzgerald, GA	Fitzgerald HS; Georgia Tech	6 ft 1 in (1.85 m)	195 lb (88 kg)	–	
James Graham; QB	Recruit ratings: Scout: Rivals: 247Sports: ESPN:					
Harrison Hamsley; TE	Valdosta, GA	The Valwood	6 ft 3 in (1.91 m)	230 lb (100 kg)	–	
Harrison Hamsley; TE	Recruit ratings: Scout: Rivals: 247Sports: ESPN:					
Seaburn Hines IV; OL	Helena, AL	Helena HS	6 ft 2 in (1.88 m)	290 lb (130 kg)	–	
Seaburn Hines IV; OL	Recruit ratings: Scout: Rivals: 247Sports: ESPN:					
Andrew Johnson Jr. OLB	Tifton, GA	Tift County HS; Oregon	6 ft 2 in (1.88 m)	230 lb (100 kg)	–	
Andrew Johnson Jr. OLB	Recruit ratings: Scout: Rivals: 247Sports: ESPN:					
Amare Jones; RB	Frisco, TX	Heritage HS; Tulane	5 ft 11 in (1.80 m)	190 lb (86 kg)	–	
Amare Jones; RB	Recruit ratings: Scout: Rivals: 247Sports: ESPN:					
Evan Lester; TE	Dalton, GA	Christian Heritage	6 ft 2 in (1.88 m)	220 lb (100 kg)	–	
Evan Lester; TE	Recruit ratings: Scout: Rivals: 247Sports: ESPN:					
Montae Maxwell; DB	Hartwell, GA	Hart County HS	6 ft 3 in (1.91 m)	175 lb (79 kg)	–	Aug 12, 2020
Montae Maxwell; DB	Recruit ratings: Scout: Rivals: 247Sports: ESPN:					
Jjay Mcafee; WR	Charleston, SC	Ashley Ridge HS; Georgia Military	6 ft 3 in (1.91 m)	215 lb (98 kg)	–	
Jjay Mcafee; WR	Recruit ratings: Scout: Rivals: 247Sports: ESPN:					
LJ McCloud; DL	Pike Road, AL	Pike Road HS	6 ft 1 in (1.85 m)	265 lb (120 kg)	–	
LJ McCloud; DL	Recruit ratings: Scout: Rivals: 247Sports: ESPN:					
Nick Mercer; DL	Cordele, GA	Crisp County HS	6 ft 3 in (1.91 m)	230 lb (100 kg)	–	
Nick Mercer; DL	Recruit ratings: Scout: Rivals: 247Sports: ESPN:					
Justin Meyers; DB	Washington, GA	Washington-Wilkes HS	6 ft 0 in (1.83 m)	185 lb (84 kg)	–	
Justin Meyers; DB	Recruit ratings: Scout: Rivals: 247Sports: ESPN:					
Cam'Ron Ransom; QB	Lakeland, FL	Armwood HS	6 ft 3 in (1.91 m)	220 lb (100 kg)	–	
Cam'Ron Ransom; QB	Recruit ratings: Scout: Rivals: 247Sports: ESPN:					
Davion Rhodes; DL	Camilla, GA	Pelham HS	6 ft 3 in (1.91 m)	235 lb (107 kg)	–	
Davion Rhodes; DL	Recruit ratings: Scout: Rivals: 247Sports: ESPN:					
Eldrick Robinson II; LB	Pensacola, FL	Booker T. Washington HS	6 ft 1 in (1.85 m)	210 lb (95 kg)	–	
Eldrick Robinson II; LB	Recruit ratings: Scout: Rivals: 247Sports: ESPN:					
Nathan Tillman; LS	Claxton, GA	Claxton HS	6 ft 2 in (1.88 m)	220 lb (100 kg)	–	
Nathan Tillman; LS	Recruit ratings: Scout: Rivals: 247Sports: ESPN:					
Josh Trice; DB	Waverly Hall, GA	Harris County HS	5 ft 11 in (1.80 m)	170 lb (77 kg)	–	
Josh Trice; DB	Recruit ratings: Scout: Rivals: 247Sports: ESPN:					
Isaac Walker; LB	Greensboro, NC	Hough HS	6 ft 2 in (1.88 m)	230 lb (100 kg)	–	
Isaac Walker; LB	Recruit ratings: Scout: Rivals: 247Sports: ESPN:					
Britton Williams; PK	Richmond Hill, GA	Richmond Hill HS	5 ft 11 in (1.80 m)	170 lb (77 kg)	–	
Britton Williams; PK	Recruit ratings: Scout: Rivals: 247Sports: ESPN:					
Myzel Williams; DB	DeLand, FL	DeLand HS	6 ft 0 in (1.83 m)	190 lb (86 kg)	–	
Myzel Williams; DB	Recruit ratings: Scout: Rivals: 247Sports: ESPN:					
Myles Winslow; DL	Kissimmee, FL	Tohopekaliga HS	6 ft 4 in (1.93 m)	225 lb (102 kg)	–	
Myles Winslow; DL	Recruit ratings: Scout: Rivals: 247Sports: ESPN:					

=== Sun Belt coaches poll ===
The Sun Belt coaches poll was released on July 20, 2021. The Eagles were picked to finish fourth in the East Division.

=== Sun Belt Preseason All-Conference teams ===
Offense

2nd team

- JD king – Running Back, SR
- Aaron dowell – Offensive Lineman, SR

Defense

1st team

- Derrick canteen – Defensive Back, RS-SO

Special teams

2nd teams

- Anthony beck ii – Punter, RS-JR
- Khaleb hood – Return Specialist, JR

== Personnel ==
2021 Georgia Southern Eagles football team roster
Players
Coaches
Offense

Pos.	#	Name	Class
RB	1	J. D. King	Sr
RB	2	Logan Wright	Sr
RB	4	Gerald Green	So
RB	5	Amare Jones	Sr
WR	6	NaJee Thompson	Sr
WR	7	Khaleb Hood	Jr
WR	9	Jjay Mcafee	Jr
WR	10	Darius Lewis	So
TE	11	Beau Johnson	So
WR	12	James Graham	Jr
QB	13	Connor Cigelske	Fr
QB	14	Sam Kenerson	Fr
QB	16	Quincy Bonner	Fr
QB	17	Justin Tomlin	Jr
QB	18	Will Lovett Jr.	Sr
QB	19	Cam'Ron Ransom	Fr
WR	20	Justin Harris	Fr
WR	21	Derwin Burgess Jr.	Fr
TE	22	Sean Pelkisson	So
RB	25	Jalen White	So
WR	28	Dexter Carter Jr.	Sr
RB	29	AJ Brown	So
WR	30	Alex Bowen	Fr
WR	31	Andrew Douglas	Fr
RB	35	Terron Dixon II	So
WR	36	Justin Howell	So
WR	37	Quincy Darnell	So
WR	38	Myles Freeman	So
WR	39	Bo White	So
RB	47	Jordan Pearson	So
TE	48	Harrison Hamsley	Fr
TE	49	Javian Boykin	So
OL	50	Caleb Kelly	Sr
OL	51	Aaron Dowdell	Sr
OL	56	Brian Miller	Sr
OL	58	Aaron Pyron	So
OL	59	Dakota Anthony	Fr
OL	60	Rasheed Miller	Fr
OL	61	Liam Ryan	Sr
OL	63	Teva Reynolds	So
OL	64	Caelan Williams	Fr
OL	65	Trace Dorminy	So
OL	66	Logan Langemeier	Sr
OL	67	Seaburn Hines IV	Fr
OL	71	Lawson Maxwell	So
OL	72	Khalil Crowder	Jr
OL	73	Chas Collins	Fr
OL	74	Lawrence Edwards	Sr
OL	75	Verneal Henshaw Jr.	So
OL	77	Griffin Carder	So
OL	78	Caleb Cook	Fr
OL	79	Gabriel Howard	Sr
TE	80	D. J. Butler	Sr
WR	81	Jeremy Horton	Jr
WR	82	Drew Rutledge	So
TE	83	Chase Hancock	Jr
WR	84	Jaden Jenkins	So
WR	85	Emil Smith	So
WR	86	Mason Babay	Fr
TE	87	Evan Lester	Fr
WR	88	Jordan Bennett	Fr
TE	89	Jackson Wheeler	Fr

Defense

Pos.	#	Name	Class
ILB	1	Todd Bradley-Glenn	Sr
DE	2	Justin Ellis	Sr
CB	4	Tyler Bride	So
OLB	5	Benz Josue	Sr
ILB	9	Khadry Jackson	Jr
S	10	Chalon Howard	Fr
ILB	11	Kevon Glenn	So
S	12	Anthony Wilson	So
CB	13	Derrick Canteen	So
CB	14	Darrell Baker Jr.	Sr
OLB	15	Quin Williams	Jr
S	17	Myzel Williams	Fr
S	18	Justin Birdsong	Sr
CB	20	Seth Robertson	So
OLB	21	Zyon McGee	Jr
S	23	Montae Maxwell	Fr
CB	24	Josh Trice	Fr
S	25	Tyrell Davis	Fr
OLB	27	Isaac Walker	Fr
ILB	28	Andrew Johnson Jr.	Jr
S	29	Justin Meyers	Fr
CB	30	Jack Ferguson	Fr
S	31	Chase Dial-Watson	Fr
ILB	33	Marques Watson-Trent	So
ILB	34	Jon Ferguson	Jr
S	35	Chandler Dial-Watson	Fr
CB	36	Justin Nelson	So
CB	38	Deonta Bembry	Jr
OLB	39	Reid Dedman	So
OLB	40	Jalen Jackson	So
ILB	41	Seth Hodges	Fr
DE	42	Dillon Springer	Sr
ILB	43	Tre Allen	Sr
ILB	45	Michael Edwards III	Fr
ILB	46	Eldrick Robinson II	Fr
OLB	47	Randy Wade Jr.	Sr
DE	48	Nick Mercer	Fr
DE	52	Brandon Wilson	So
DL	53	Trevon Locke	Fr
OLB	54	Will Riggins	Fr
DL	57	Gavin Adcock	Sr
DE	62	Robb Bozeman	Sr
DL	69	Jeremy Smith	Sr
DL	76	Cauldric Isles	So
DE	79	Kaylen Wright	Jr
DL	90	Parker Devine	Jr
DE	91	Davion Rhodes	Fr
DE	92	Jordan Mitchell	So
DE	93	AJ Watkins	Jr
DL	94	C. J. Wright	Sr
DL	95	Amaru Herring	So
DL	96	LJ McCloud	Fr
DE	97	Myles Winslow	Fr
DL	99	Kierron Smith	So

Special teams

Pos.	#	Name	Class
P	7	Anthony Beck II	Jr
K	19	Alex Raynor	So
LS	41	Nathan Tillman	Fr
K	82	Britton Williams	Fr
LS	95	Mark Langston	So
K	97	Bryce Christensen	Jr
P	99	Walker Bradberry	Fr

Head coach

- Kevin Whitley (Nova Southeastern)
  Interim Head Coach & Cornerbacks Coach

Coordinators/assistant coaches

- Doug Ruse (Northwest Missouri State)
  Offensive coordinator/qb
- Scot Sloan (North Greenville)
  Defensive coordinator/s
- Joe Graves (Southeastern Louisiana)
  Special teams coordinator/te
- Victor Cabral (Georgia Southern)
  Recruiting coordinator/dl
- Travis Cunningham (Gardner–Webb)
  Inside linebackers
- Jeremy Rowell (Troy)
  Outside linebackers
- Derrick Sherman (Georgia Southern)
  Wide receivers
- Favian Upshaw (Tulane)
  Running backs
- Geep Wade (Chattanooga)
  Offensive lineman

Legend

- (C) Team captain
- (S) Suspended
- (I) Ineligible
- Injured
- Redshirt

Roster
Last update: 4 July 2021

== Schedule ==
The 2021 schedule consisted of 6 home and 6 away games in the regular season. The Eagles would travel to Sun Belt foes Troy, South Alabama, Texas State, and Appalachian State. Southern would play host to Sun Belt foes Louisiana, Arkansas State, Georgia State, and Coastal Carolina.

The Eagles would host two of the four non-conference opponents at Paulson Stadium, Gardner–Webb, from NCAA Division I FCS Big South Conference and BYU, a FBS Independent, and would travel to Florida Atlantic of the Conference USA and Arkansas of the Southeastern Conference.

Date	Time	Opponent	Site	TV	Result	Attendance
September 4	6:00 p.m.	Gardner–Webb*	Paulson Stadium; Statesboro, GA	ESPN3	W 30–25	15,089
September 11	3:30 p.m.	at Florida Atlantic*	FAU Stadium; Boca Raton, FL	Stadium	L 6–38	17,736
September 18	4:00 p.m.	at No. 20 Arkansas*	Donald W. Reynolds Razorback Stadium; Fayetteville, AR	SECN	L 10–45	66,311
September 25	6:00 p.m.	Louisiana	Paulson Stadium; Statesboro, GA	ESPN+	L 20–28	17,522
October 2	4:00 p.m.	Arkansas State	Paulson Stadium; Statesboro, GA	ESPN+	W 59–33	16,377
October 9	7:00 p.m.	at Troy	Veterans Memorial Stadium; Troy, AL	ESPN+	L 24–27	25,424
October 14	7:30 p.m.	at South Alabama	Hancock Whitney Stadium; Mobile, AL	ESPNU	L 14–41	16,089
October 30	6:00 p.m.	Georgia State^{†}	Paulson Stadium; Statesboro, GA (Modern Day Hate)	ESPN+	L 14–21	17,843
November 6	6:00 p.m.	Coastal Carolina	Paulson Stadium; Statesboro, GA	ESPN+	L 8–28	12,875
November 13	3:00 p.m.	at Texas State	Bobcat Stadium; San Marcos, TX	ESPN+	W 38–30	15,896
November 20	4:00 p.m.	No. 14 BYU*	Paulson Stadium; Statesboro, GA	ESPN+	L 17–34	20,862
November 27	2:30 p.m.	at Appalachian State	Kidd Brewer Stadium; Boone, NC (rivalry)	ESPN+	L 3–27	28,005
*Non-conference game; ^{†}Homecoming; Rankings from AP Poll (and CFP Rankings, after November 2) - Released prior to game; All times are in Eastern time

== Game summaries ==
=== Gardner–Webb ===
Gardner–Webb at Georgia Southern

Team	1	2	3	4	Total
Runnin' Bulldogs	6	0	6	13	25
• Eagles	3	17	0	10	30

- Date: September 4, 2021
- Location: Paulson Stadium
  Statesboro, GA
- Game start: 6:05 p.m. EDT
- Elapsed time: 3 hours and 39 minutes
- Game attendance: 15,089
- Game weather: 79 °F (26 °C) • Weather: Sunny
- Referee: Jeremy Parker
- TV announcers (ESPN3): Matt Stewart (play-by-play) and Evan Waugh (analyst)

Scoring summary
1	04:20	GASO	Britton Williams 49-yard field goal (14 plays, 52 yards, 6:16)	GASO 7–0
1	00:51	GWU	T. J. Luther 41-yard pass from Bailey Fisher (two-point conversion pass attempt failed) (7 plays, 75 yards, 3:29)	GASO 7–6
2	13:11	GASO	Gerald Green 1-yard rush (Britton Williams kick) (8 plays, 68 yards, 2:34)	GASO 10–6
2	04:00	GASO	Chase Hancock 17-yard pass from Cam Ransom (Britton Williams kick) (15 plays, 75 yards, 7:33)	GASO 17–6
2	00:03	GASO	Britton Williams 25-yard field goal (11 plays, 66 yards, 1:54)	GASO 20–6
3	05:54	GWU	Justin Jordan 50-yard pass from Justin Franklin (Austin McKay PAT failed) (3 plays, 90 yards, 0:52)	GASO 20–12
4	14:55	GASO	Britton Williams 23-yard field goal (13 plays, 73 yards, 5:52)	GASO 23–12
4	09:32	GWU	Deland Thomas 6-yard pass from Bailey Fisher (two-point conversion attempt failed) (6 plays, 74 yards, 2:29)	GASO 23–18
4	06:32	GASO	Logan Wright 8-yard rush (Britton Williams kick) (6 plays, 57 yards, 2:51)	GASO 30–18
4	02:59	GWU	Justin Franklin 7-yard pass from Bailey Fisher (Austin McKay kick) (11 plays, 75 yards, 3:27)	GASO 30–25

Statistics	Gardner–Webb	Georgia Southern
First downs	20	25
Total yards	427	500
Rushing yards	62	365
Passing yards	365	135
Turnovers	0	0
Time of possession	24:11	35:49

Team	Category	Player	Statistics
Gardner–Webb	Passing	Bailey Fisher	27/45, 315 yards, 3 TDs
Gardner–Webb	Rushing	Narii Gaither	7 carries, 33 yards
Gardner–Webb	Receiving	T. J. Luther	6 receptions, 164 yards, 1 TD
Georgia Southern	Passing	Cam Ransom	8/13, 90 yards, 1 TD
Georgia Southern	Rushing	Logan Wright	26 carries, 178 yards, 1 TD
Georgia Southern	Receiving	Khaleb Hood	3 receptions, 39 yards

=== At Florida Atlantic ===
Georgia Southern at Florida Atlantic

Team	1	2	3	4	Total
Eagles	6	0	0	0	6
• Owls	0	10	21	7	38

- Date: September 11, 2021
- Location: FAU Stadium
  Boca Raton, FL
- Game start: 3:36 p.m. EDT
- Elapsed time: 3 hours and 30 minutes
- Game attendance: 17,736
- Game weather: Sunny • Wind: E 5 MPH
- Referee: Ed Ardito
- TV announcers (Stadium): Chris Hassel (play–by–play) and Sed Bonner (analyst)

Scoring summary
1	03:19	GASO	Logan Wright 22-yard rush (Britton Williams PAT failed) (14 plays, 95 yards, 5:42)	GASO 6–0
2	01:45	FAU	John Mitchell 19-yard pass from N'Kosi Perry (Aaronm Shahriari kick) (10 plays, 48 yards, 3:25)	FAU 7–6
2	00:00	FAU	Aaron Shahriari 27-yard field goal (7 plays, 60 yards, 1:06)	FAU 10–6
3	11:28	FAU	Je'Quan Burton 50-yard pass from N'Kosi Perry (Aaron Shahriari kick) (5 plays, 75 yards, 1:50)	FAU 17–6
3	04:34	FAU	John Mitchell 22-yard pass from N'Kosi Perry (Aaron Shahriari kick) (12 plays, 87 yards, 4:24)	FAU 24–6
3	01:50	FAU	Lajohntay Wester 31-yard pass from N'Kosi Perry (Aaron Shahriari kick) (6 plays, 50 yards, 1:56)	FAU 31–6
4	01:17	FAU	Nick Tronti 3-yard rush (Aaron Shahriari kick) (8 plays, 35 yards, 2:13)	FAU 38–6

Statistics	Georgia Southern	Florida Atlantic
First downs	17	27
Total yards	257	528
Rushing yards	139	196
Passing yards	118	332
Turnovers	2	0
Time of possession	26:04	33:38

Team	Category	Player	Statistics
Georgia Southern	Passing	Cam Ransom	12/21, 98 yards
Georgia Southern	Rushing	Cam Ransom	9 carries, 41 yards
Georgia Southern	Receiving	Gerald Green	6 receptions, 55 yards
Florida Atlantic	Passing	N'Kosi Perry	19/27, 332 yards, 4 TDs
Florida Atlantic	Rushing	Johnny Ford	15 carries, 71 yards
Florida Atlantic	Receiving	LaJohntay Wester	7 receptions, 124 yards, 1 TD

=== At Arkansas ===
Georgia Southern at Arkansas

Team	1	2	3	4	Total
Eagles	0	10	0	0	10
• No. 20 Razorbacks	14	10	14	7	45

- Date: September 18, 2021
- Location: Donald W. Reynolds Razorback Stadium
  Fayetteville, AR
- Game start: 4:01 p.m. EDT
- Elapsed time: 3 hours and 11 minutes
- Game attendance: 66,311
- Game weather: 89 °F (32 °C) • Weather: Cloudy • Wind: N 8 MPH
- Referee: Matt Loeffler
- TV announcers (SEC Network): Dave Neal (play–by–play), Deuce McAllister (analysis), and Andraya Carter (sideline reporter)

Scoring summary
1	12:07	ARK	Trelon Smith 13-yard rush (Cam Little kick) (4 plays, 73 yards, 1:12)	ARK 7–0
1	03:31	ARK	Dominique Johnson 11-yard rush (Cam Little kick) (15 plays, 94 yards, 6:30}	ARK 14–0
2	08:42	ARK	Tyson Morris 14-yard pass from KJ Jefferson (Cam Little kick) (7 plays, 99 yards, 1:56)	ARK 21–0
2	07:22	GASO	Justin Tomlin 76-yard rush (Alex Raynor kick) (3 plays, 75 yards, 1:20)	ARK 21–7
2	02:23	ARK	Cam Little 25-yard field goal (7 plays, 73 yards, 2:48)	ARK 24–7
2	00:00	GASO	Alex Raynor 32-yard field goal (12 plays, 60 yards, 2:23)	ARK 24–10
3	13:26	ARK	Warren Thompson 60-yard pass from KJ Jefferson (Cam Little kick) (4 plays, 80 yards, 1:34)	ARK 31–10
3	11:18	ARK	Treylon Burks 91-yard pass from KJ Jefferson (Cam Little kick) (1 play, 91 yards, 0:14)	ARK 38–10
4	08:22	ARK	Malik Hornsby 6-yard rush (Cam Little kick) (12 plays, 66 yards, 7:01)	ARK 45–10

Statistics	Georgia Southern	Arkansas
First downs	11	27
Total yards	235	633
Rushing yards	154	269
Passing yards	81	364
Turnovers	0	0
Time of possession	26:54	33:06

Team	Category	Player	Statistics
Georgia Southern	Passing	Justin Tomlin	11/23, 65 yards
Georgia Southern	Rushing	Justin Tomlin	10 carries, 67 yards, 1 TD
Georgia Southern	Receiving	Khaleb Hood	6 receptions, 42 yards
Arkansas	Passing	KJ Jefferson	13/23, 366 yards, 3 TDs
Arkansas	Rushing	Dominique Johnson	5 carries, 72 yards, 1 TD
Arkansas	Receiving	Treylon Burks	3 receptions, 127 yards, 1 TD

=== Louisiana ===
Louisiana at Georgia Southern

Team	1	2	3	4	Total
• Ragin' Cajuns	0	14	14	0	28
Eagles	7	6	0	7	20

- Date: September 25, 2021
- Location: Paulson Stadium
  Statesboro, GA
- Game start: 6:03 p.m. EDT
- Elapsed time: 3 hours and 29 minutes
- Game attendance: 17,522
- Game weather: 59 °F (15 °C) • Weather: Sunny • Wind: NW 3 MPH
- Referee: Kyle Olson
- TV announcers (ESPN+): Matt Stewart (play–by–play) and Danny Waugh (analyst)

Scoring summary
1	06:39	GASO	Gerald Green 8-yard rush (Alex Raynor kick) (16 plays, 83 yards, 6:12)	GASO 7–0
2	14:52	LA	Michael Jefferson 48-yard pass from Levi Lewis (Kenneth Almendares kick) (6 plays, 85 yards, 2:07)	TIE 7–7
2	08:01	LA	Emani Bailey 3-yard rush (Kenneth Almendares kick) (10 plays, 59 yards, 5:21)	LA 14–7
2	03:21	GASO	Gerald Green 3-yard rush (Alex Raynor PAT blocked) (4 plays, 45 yards, 1:19)	LA 14–13
3	11:01	LA	Johnny Lumpkin 22-yard pass from Levi Lewis (Kenneth Almendares kick) (5 plays, 68 yards, 1:32)	LA 21–13
3	06:52	LA	Dontae Fleming 46-yard pass from Levi Lewis (Kenneth Almendares kick) (5 plays, 92 yards, 1:50)	LA 28–13
4	13:26	GASO	Gerald Green 76-yard rush (Alex Raynor kick) (3 plays, 85 yards, 1:26)	LA 28–20

Statistics	Louisiana	Georgia Southern
First downs	18	23
Total yards	378	453
Rushing yards	129	278
Passing yards	249	175
Turnovers	0	1
Time of possession	27:11	32:49

Team	Category	Player	Statistics
Louisiana	Passing	Levi Lewis	17/28, 249 yards, 3 TDs
Louisiana	Rushing	Montrell Johnson	13 carries, 61 yards
Louisiana	Receiving	Dontae Fleming	4 receptions, 70 yards, 1 TD
Georgia Southern	Passing	Justin Tomlin	11/24, 175 yards, 1 INT
Georgia Southern	Rushing	Gerald Green	18 carries, 186 yards, 3 TDs
Georgia Southern	Receiving	Logan Wright	4 receptions, 85 yards

=== Arkansas State ===
Arkansas State at Georgia Southern

Team	1	2	3	4	Total
Red Wolves	3	16	0	14	33
• Eagles	10	21	14	14	59

- Date: October 2, 2021
- Location: Paulson Stadium
  Statesboro, GA
- Game start: 4:05 p.m. EDT
- Elapsed time: 3 hours and 29 minutes
- Game attendance: 16,377
- Game weather: Sunny
- Referee: Wayne Winkler
- TV announcers (ESPN+): Danny Waugh (play–by–play) and Amy Zimmer (analyst)

Scoring summary
1	06:32	GASO	Logan Wright 59-yard rush (Alex Raynor kick) (8 plays, 80 yards, 3:56)	GASO 7–0
1	03:25	ARST	Blake Grupe 31-yard field goal (6 plays, 51 yards, 3:07)	GASO 7–3
1	01:03	GASO	Alex Raynor 25-yard field goal (6 plays, 67 yards, 2:22)	GASO 10–3
2	13:21	ARST	Corey Rucker 2-yard pass from James Blackman (Blake Grupe kick) (9 plays, 75 yards, 2:42)	TIE 10–10
2	09:41	GASO	Gerald Green 23-yard rush (Alex Raynor kick) (9 plays, 74 yards, 3:32)	GASO 17–10
2	06:41	ARST	Team Safety (3 plays, -11 yards, 0:48)	GASO 17–12
2	04:38	ARST	Corey Rucker 19-yard pass from James Blackman (Blake Grupe kick) (5 plays, 53 yards, 1:56)	ARST 19–17
2	03:32	GASO	Logan Wright 41-yard rush (Alex Raynor kick) (4 plays, 75 yards, 1:06)	GASO 24–19
2	02:00	GASO	J. D. King 5-yard rush (Alex Raynor kick) (3 plays, 32 yards, 1:01)	GASO 31–19
3	10:54	GASO	Justin Tomlin 6-yard rush (Alex Raynor kick) (9 plays, 65 yards, 4:06)	GASO 38–19
3	05:08	GASO	Quin Williams 22-yard interception returned (Alex Raynor kick) (4 plays, 8 yards, 1:37)	GASO 45–19
4	14:47	GASO	Jalen White 59-yard rush (Alex Raynor kick) (2 plays, 63 yards, 0:30)	GASO 52–19
4	11:59	ARST	Dahu Green 16-yard pass from Layne Hatcher (Blake Grupe kick) (7 plays, 75 yards, 2:48)	GASO 52–26
4	09:13	ARST	Lincoln Pare 13-yard pass from Layne Hatcher (Blake Grupe kick) (4 plays, 69 yards, 1:03)	GASO 52–33
4	09:03	GASO	Jalen White 47-yard rush (Alex Raynor kick) (1 play, 47 yards, 0:09)	GASO 59–33

Statistics	Arkansas State	Georgia Southern
First downs	34	20
Total yards	524	540
Rushing yards	81	503
Passing yards	443	37
Turnovers	4	0
Time of possession	31:04	28:56

Team	Category	Player	Statistics
Arkansas State	Passing	James Blackman	28/43, 292 yards, 2 TDs, 3 INTs
Arkansas State	Rushing	Lincoln Pare	7 carries, 54 yards
Arkansas State	Receiving	Jeff Foreman	6 receptions, 83 yards
Georgia Southern	Passing	Cam Ransom	2/5, 29 yards
Georgia Southern	Rushing	Logan Wright	10 carries, 214 yards, 2 TDs
Georgia Southern	Receiving	Khaleb Hood	2 receptions, 19 yards

=== At Troy ===
Georgia Southern at Troy

Team	1	2	3	4	Total
Eagles	0	3	15	6	24
• Trojans	10	7	7	3	27

- Date: October 9, 2021
- Location: Veterans Memorial Stadium
  Troy, AL
- Game start: 7:05 p.m. EDT
- Elapsed time: 3 hours and 23 minutes
- Game attendance: 25,424
- Game weather: 78 °F (26 °C) • Weather: Sunny • Wind: S 4 MPH
- Referee: Trennis Livingston
- TV announcers (ESPN+): Will Kollmeyer (play–by–play) and Ben Stanfield (analyst)

Scoring summary
1	10:43	TROY	Brooks Buce 29-yard field goal (10 plays, 66 yards, 4:17)	TROY 3–0
1	00:37	TROY	Jabre Barber 15-yard pass from Gunnar Watson (Brooks Buce kick) (5 plays, 91 yards, 1:56)	TROY 10–0
2	12:15	GASO	Alex Raynor 27-yard field goal (6 plays, 51 yards, 3:20)	TROY 10–3
2	04:27	TROY	Jamontez Woods 34-yard rush (Brooks Buce kick) (4 plays, 57 yards, 1:38)	TROY 17–3
3	10:55	TROY	Reggie Todd 26-yard pass from Gunnar Watson (Brooks Buce kick) (4 plays, 62 yards, 1:39)	TROY 24–3
3	07:57	GASO	Logan Wright 1-yard rush (Justin Tomlin two-point conversion rush) (6 plays, 75 yards, 2:58)	TROY 24–11
3	06:45	GASO	Khaleb Hood 23-yard rush (Alex Raynor kick) (3 plays, 35 yards, 1:01)	TROY 24–18
4	12:53	GASO	Alex Raynor 42-yard field goal (6 plays, 31 yards, 1:54)	TROY 24–21
4	06:08	GASO	Alex Raynor 38-yard field goal (9 plays, 41 yards, 5:52)	TIE 24–24
4	01:46	TROY	Brooks Buce 24-yard field goal (6 plays, 40 yards, 2:23)	TROY 24–27

Statistics	Georgia Southern	Troy
First downs	17	18
Total yards	301	409
Rushing yards	82	139
Passing yards	219	270
Turnovers	3	1
Time of possession	33:19	26:41

Team	Category	Player	Statistics
Georgia Southern	Passing	Justin Tomlin	15/22, 210 yards, 3 INTs
Georgia Southern	Rushing	Gerald Green	5 carries, 33 yards
Georgia Southern	Receiving	Derwin Burgess Jr.	2 receptions, 76 yards
Troy	Passing	Gunnar Watson	24/36, 270 yards, 2 TDs
Troy	Rushing	Jamontez Woods	9 carries, 98 yards, 1 TD
Troy	Receiving	Reggie Todd	4 receptions, 71 yards, 1 TD

=== At South Alabama ===
Georgia Southern at South Alabama

Team	1	2	3	4	Total
Eagles	0	8	3	3	14
• Jaguars	10	21	7	3	41

- Date: October 14, 2021
- Location: Hancock Whitney Stadium
  Mobile, AL
- Game start: 7:30 p.m. EDT
- Elapsed time: 3 hours and 15 minutes
- Game attendance: 16,089
- Game weather: 82 °F (28 °C) • Weather: Sunny • Wind: S 5 MPH
- Referee: Kyle Olson
- TV announcers (ESPNU): Drew Carter (play–by–play) and Mark Herzlich (analyst)

Scoring summary
1	10:16	USA	Jake Bentley 12-yard rush (Diego Guajardo kick) (10 plays, 84 yards, 4:44)	USA 7–0
1	02:03	USA	Diego Guajardo 42-yard field goal (11 plays, 61 yards, 3:58)	USA 10–0
2	14:00	USA	Jake Bentley 6-yard rush (Diego Guajardo kick) (7 plays, 55 yards, 2:12)	USA 17–0
2	12:29	USA	Jalen Tolbert 40-yard pass from Jake Bentley (Diego Guajardo kick) (1 play, 40 yards, 0:08)	USA 24–0
2	09:08	USA	Jalen Wayne 5-yard pass from Jake Bentley (Diego Guajardo kick) (3 plays, 70 yards, 1:27)	USA 31–0
2	02:00	GASO	J. D. King 2-yard rush (Justin Tomlin two-point conversion pass to Amare Jones) (15 plays, 75 yards, 7:08)	USA 31–8
3	10:22	GASO	Alex Raynor 44-yard field goal (10 plays, 48 yards, 4:38)	USA 31–11
3	03:41	USA	Lincoln Sefcik 5-yard pass from Jake Bentley (Diego Guajardo kick) (5 plays, 82 yards, 2:37)	USA 38–11
4	14:50	GASO	Alex Raynor 34-yard field goal (10 plays, 58 yards, 3:51)	USA 38–14
4	04:55	USA	Diego Guajardo 31-yard field goal (7 plays, 49 yards, 3:49)	USA 41–14

Statistics	Georgia Southern	South Alabama
First downs	10	20
Total yards	233	545
Rushing yards	121	140
Passing yards	112	405
Turnovers	1	0
Time of possession	30:02	29:58

Team	Category	Player	Statistics
Georgia Southern	Passing	Cam Ransom	2/12, 63 yards
Georgia Southern	Rushing	Logan Wright	14 carries, 60 yards
Georgia Southern	Receiving	Amare Jones	4 receptions, 90 yards
South Alabama	Passing	Jake Bentley	24/31, 389 yards, 3 TDs
South Alabama	Rushing	Bryan Hill	8 carries, 65 yards
South Alabama	Receiving	Jalen Tolbert	11 receptions, 174 yards, 1 TD

=== Georgia State ===
Georgia State at Georgia Southern

Team	1	2	3	4	Total
• Panthers	0	0	7	14	21
Eagles	0	7	0	7	14

- Date: October 30, 2021
- Location: Paulson Stadium
  Statesboro, GA
- Game start: 6:05 p.m. EDT
- Elapsed time: 3 hours and 7 minutes
- Game attendance: 17,843
- Game weather: Sunny
- Referee: Wayne Winkler
- TV announcers (ESPN+): Matt Stewart (play–by–play) and Danny Waugh (analyst)

Scoring summary
2	05:23	GASO	Beau Johnson 17-yard pass from Justin Tomlin (Alex Raynor kick) (9 plays, 92 yards, 4:44)	GASO 7–0
3	08:06	GSU	Tucker Gregg 2-yard rush (Noel Ruiz kick) (9 plays, 69 yards, 3:02)	TIE 7–7
4	11:19	GSU	Tucker Gregg 3-yard rush (Noel Ruiz kick) (8 plays, 83 yards, 3:05)	GSU 14–7
4	01:39	GASO	Logan Wright 9-yard rush (Alex Raynor kick) (5 plays, 42 yards, 1:25)	TIE 14–14
4	00:26	GSU	Jaymest Williams 23-yard rush (Noel Ruiz kick) (7 plays, 73 yards, 1:06)	GSU 21–14

Statistics	Georgia State	Georgia Southern
First downs	22	24
Total yards	378	486
Rushing yards	237	207
Passing yards	141	279
Turnovers	0	2
Time of possession	25:07	34:53

Team	Category	Player	Statistics
Georgia State	Passing	Darren Grainger	16/27, 141 yards
Georgia State	Rushing	Jaymest Williams	12 carries, 97 yards, 1 TD
Georgia State	Receiving	Roger Carter	2 receptions, 59 yards
Georgia Southern	Passing	Justin Tomlin	18/27, 279 yards, 1 TD, 2 INTs
Georgia Southern	Rushing	Logan Wright	20 carries, 113 yards, 1 TD
Georgia Southern	Receiving	Khaleb Hood	6 receptions, 107 yards

=== Coastal Carolina ===
Coastal Carolina at Georgia Southern

Team	1	2	3	4	Total
• Chanticleers	0	21	7	0	28
Eagles	0	0	0	8	8

- Date: November 6, 2021
- Location: Paulson Stadium
  Statesboro, GA
- Game start: 6:05 p.m. EDT
- Elapsed time: 3 hours
- Game attendance: 12,875
- Game weather: Sunny
- Referee: Kyle Olson
- TV announcers (ESPN+): Matt Stewart (play–by–play) and Danny Waugh (analyst)

Scoring summary
2	08:54	CCU	Kameron Brown 12 yard pass from Bryce Carpenter (Massimo Biscardi kick) (3 plays, 36 yards, 1:28)	CCU 7–0
2	03:23	CCU	Bryce Carpenter 23-yard rush (Massimo Biscardi kick) (3 plays, 40 yards, 1:12)	CCU 14–0
2	00:00	CCU	Mason Shelton 33-yard blocked punt returned (Massimo Biscardi kick) (8 plays, 19 yards, 3:16)	CCU 21–0
3	05:17	CCU	Shermari Jones 7-yard rush (Massimo Biscardi kick) (12 plays, 92 yards, 6:49)	CCU 28–0
4	10:56	GASO	Beau Johnson 6-yard pass from Cam Ransom (Cam Ransom two-point pass conversion to Derwin Burgess) (5 plays, 45 yards, 2:22)	CCU 28–8

Statistics	Coastal Carolina	Georgia Southern
First downs	17	15
Total yards	305	233
Rushing yards	220	86
Passing yards	85	147
Turnovers	1	4
Time of possession	31:37	28:23

Team	Category	Player	Statistics
Coastal Carolina	Passing	Bryce Carpenter	13/20, 85 yards, 1 TD
Coastal Carolina	Rushing	Shermari Jones	20 carries, 96 yards, 1 TD
Coastal Carolina	Receiving	Kameron Brown	3 receptions, 30 yards, 1 TD
Georgia Southern	Passing	Justin Tomlin	6/13, 83 yards, 1 INT
Georgia Southern	Rushing	Justin Tomlin	10 carries, 39 yards
Georgia Southern	Receiving	Khaleb Hood	5 receptions, 66 yards

=== At Texas State ===
Georgia Southern at Texas State

Team	1	2	3	4	Total
• Eagles	3	14	14	7	38
Bobcats	0	17	7	6	30

- Date: November 13, 2021
- Location: Bobcat Stadium
  San Marcos, TX
- Game start: 3:05 p.m. EST
- Elapsed time: 3 hours and 57 minutes
- Game attendance: 15,896
- Game weather: 70 °F (21 °C) • Weather: Sunny • Wind: S 3 MPH
- Referee: Marshall Lewis
- TV announcers (ESPN+): Brant Freeman (play–by–play), Keith Moreland (analyst), and Koral Riggs (sideline reporter)

Scoring summary
1	05:09	GASO	Alex Raynor 24-yard field goal (11 plays, 78 yards, 4:54)	GASO 3–0
2	12:04	TXST	Calvin Hill 13-yard rush (Seth Keller kick) (8 plays, 69 yards, 2:38)	TXST 7–3
2	07:59	GASO	Jalen White 19-yard rush (Alex Raynor kick) (10 plays, 75 yards, 4:05)	GASO 10–7
2	05:55	GASO	Derwin Burgess Jr. 48-yard pass from Cam Ransom (Alex Raynor kick) (3 plays, 63 yards, 1:16)	GASO 17–7
2	01:17	TXST	Seth Keller 45-yard field goal (4 plays, 5 yards, 1:25)	GASO 17–10
2	00:02	TXST	Kenny Haynes 0-yard punt returned (Seth Keller kick) (5 plays, 13 yards, 1:15)	TXST 17–17
3	11:16	GASO	Tyrell Davis 20-yard punt returned (Alex Raynor kick) (3 plays, 2 yards, 0:44)	GASO 24–17
3	05:44	TXST	Jahmyl Jeter 1-yard rush (Seth Keller kick) (6 plays, 45 yards, 2:02)	TIE 24–24
3	01:53	GASO	Beau Johnson 25-yard pass from Justin Tomlin (Alex Raynor kick) (2 plays, 25 yards, 0:10)	GASO 31–24
4	09:15	TXST	Seth Keller 33-yard field goal (8 plays, 36 yards, 2:59)	GASO 31–27
4	05:30	GASO	Jalen White 5-yard rush (Alex Raynor kick) (8 plays, 75 yards, 3:38)	GASO 38–27
4	01:10	TXST	Seth Keller 34-yard field goal (10 plays, 56 yards, 2:21)	GASO 38–30

Statistics	Georgia Southern	Texas State
First downs	19	26
Total yards	395	341
Rushing yards	162	78
Passing yards	233	263
Turnovers	1	2
Time of possession	28:08	31:52

Team	Category	Player	Statistics
Georgia Southern	Passing	Cam Ransom	7/12, 125 yards, 1 TD
Georgia Southern	Rushing	Jalen White	10 carries, 82 yards, 2 TDs
Georgia Southern	Receiving	Derwin Burgess, Jr.	5 receptions, 134 yards, 1 TD
Texas State	Passing	Tyler Vitt	29/46, 263 yards, 1 INT
Texas State	Rushing	Calvin Hill	19 carries, 43 yards, 1 TD
Texas State	Receiving	Marcell Barbee	4 receptions, 63 yards

=== BYU ===
Brigham Young at Georgia Southern

Team	1	2	3	4	Total
• No. 14 Cougars'	7	13	7	7	34
Eagles	3	14	0	0	17

- Date: November 20, 2021
- Location: Paulson Stadium
  Statesboro, GA
- Game start: 4:05 p.m. EST
- Elapsed time: 3 hours and 5 minutes
- Game attendance: 20,862
- Game weather: Sunny
- Referee: William Bonnet
- TV announcers (ESPN+): Danny Waugh (play–by–play) and Amy Zimmer (analyst)

Scoring summary
1	07:14	GASO	Alex Raynor 38-yard field goal (13 plays, 54 yards, 7:46)	GASO 3–0
1	03:15	BYU	Lopini Katoa 5-yard rush (Jake Oldroyd kick) (12 plays, 84 yards, 3:58)	BYU 7–3
2	14:56	BYU	Puka Nacua 5-yard pass from Jaren Hall (Jake Oldroyd kick) (4 plays, 75 yards, 1:26)	BYU 14–3
2	10:17	GASO	Logan Wright 3-yard rush (Alex Raynor kick) (8 plays, 72 yards, 4:34)	BYU 14–10
2	06:25	GASO	Logan Wright 11-yard rush (Alex Raynor kick) (4 plays, 57 yards, 2:07)	GASO 17–14
2	04:56	BYU	Jake Oldroyd 39-yard field goal (5 plays, 53 yards, 1:29)	TIE 17–17
2	00:46	BYU	Jake Oldroyd 38-yard field goal (5 plays, 43 yards, 1:54)	BYU 20–17
3	10:03	BYU	Tyler Allgeier 1-yard rush (Jake Oldroyd kick) (10 plays, 78 yards, 4:39)	BYU 27–17
4	10:38	BYU	Puka Nacua 29-yard pass from Jaren Hall (Jake Oldroyd kick) (6 plays, 75 yards, 3:01)	BYU 34–17

Statistics	BYU	Georgia Southern
First downs	25	19
Total yards	507	268
Rushing yards	195	146
Passing yards	312	122
Turnovers	0	2
Time of possession	31:09	28:51

Team	Category	Player	Statistics
BYU	Passing	Jaren Hall	17/29, 312 yards, 2 TDs
BYU	Rushing	Tyler Allgeier	25 carries, 136 yards, 1 TD
BYU	Receiving	Gunner Romney	5 receptions, 87 yards
Georgia Southern	Passing	Connor Cigelske	11/14, 122 yards, 1 INT
Georgia Southern	Rushing	Logan Wright	14 carries, 50 yards, 2 TDs
Georgia Southern	Receiving	Logan Wright	5 receptions, 43 yards

=== At Appalachian State ===
Georgia Southern at Appalachian State

Team	1	2	3	4	Total
Eagles	0	0	3	0	3
• Mountaineers	7	0	10	10	27

- Date: November 27, 2021
- Location: Kidd Brewer Stadium
  Boone, NC
- Game start: 2:35 p.m. EST
- Elapsed time: 2 hours and 55 minutes
- Game attendance: 28,005
- Game weather: 48 °F (9 °C) • Weather: Sunny • Wind: W 9 MPH
- Referee: Kyle Olson
- TV announcers (ESPN+): David Jackson (play–by–play) and Avery Hall (analyst)

Scoring summary
1	02:18	APP	Malik Williams 36-yard pass from Chase Brice (Chandler Staton kick) (8 plays, 80 yards, 3:06)	APP 7–0
3	05:19	APP	Chandler Staton 40-yard field goal (4 plays, 0 yards, 1:12)	APP 10–0
3	00:53	GASO	Britton Williams 38-yard field goal (11 plays, 69 yards, 4:20)	APP 10–3
3	00:40	APP	Jalen Virgil 97-yard kickoff returned (Chandler Staton kick) (3 plays, -4 yards, 1:40)	APP 17–3
4	13:50	APP	Thomas Hennigan 68-yard pass from Chase Brice (Chandler Staton kick) (1 play, 68 yards, 0:10)	APP 24–3
4	06:27	APP	Chandler Staton 36-yard field goal (6 plays, 22 yards, 2:26)	APP 27–3

Statistics	Georgia Southern	Appalachian State
First downs	15	12
Total yards	194	329
Rushing yards	87	94
Passing yards	107	235
Turnovers	1	1
Time of possession	34:35	25:25

Team	Category	Player	Statistics
Georgia Southern	Passing	Connor Cigelske	11/24, 107 yards
Georgia Southern	Rushing	Jalen White	8 carries, 38 yards
Georgia Southern	Receiving	Amare Jones	5 receptions, 56 yards
Appalachian State	Passing	Chase Brice	12/24, 235 yards, 2 TDs
Appalachian State	Rushing	Anderson Castle	6 carries, 31 yards
Appalachian State	Receiving	Thomas Hennigan	3 receptions, 111 yards, 1 TD
