= Eric Sutton (defensive back, born 1998) =

American gridiron football player (born 1998)

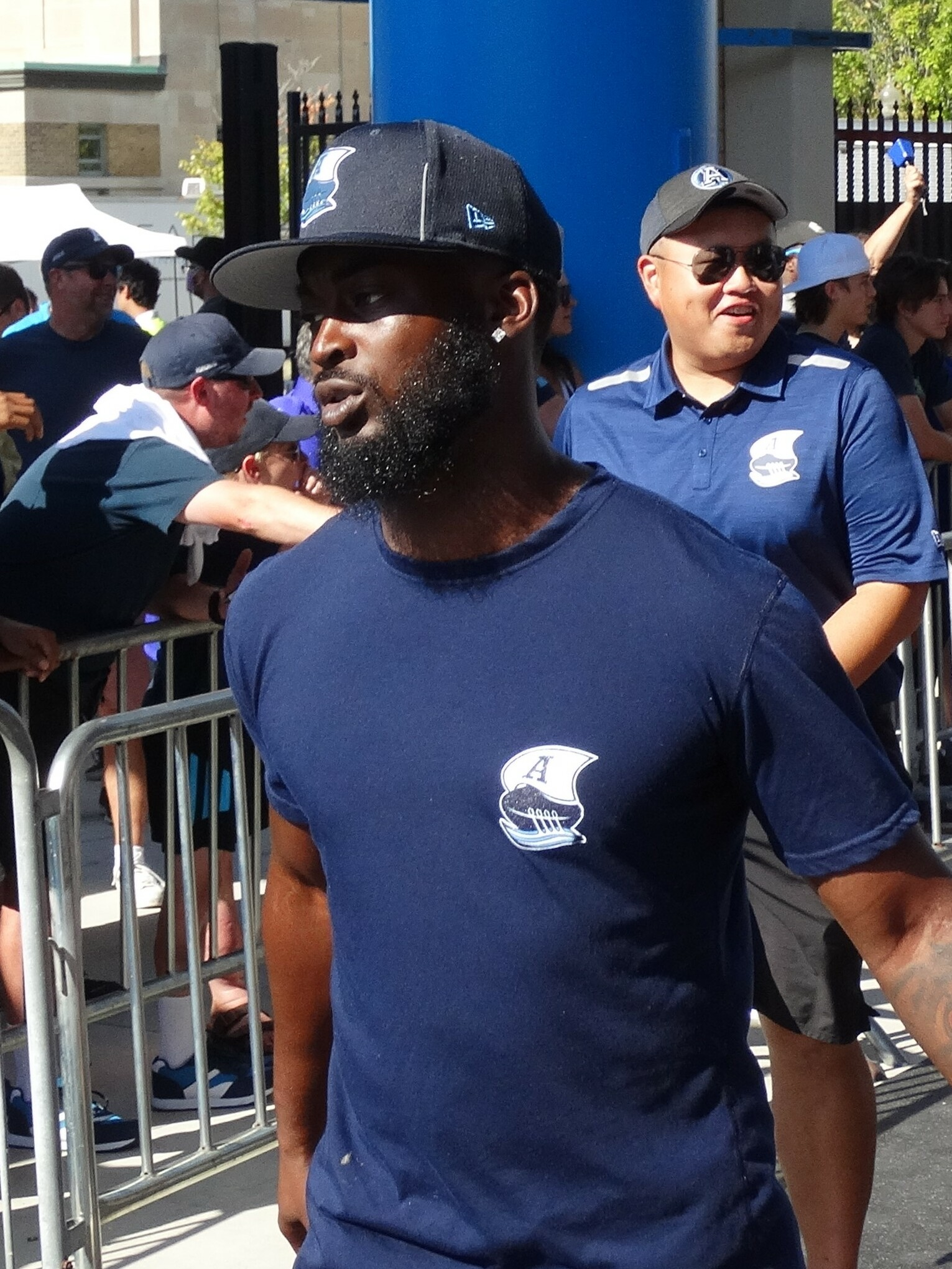
- Sutton with the Toronto Argonauts in 2022

No. 36
- Position: Defensive back

Personal information
- Born: September 5, 1998 (age 28); Regina, Saskatchewan
- Listed height: 5 ft 9 in (1.75 m)
- Listed weight: 175 lb (79 kg)

Career information
- High school: Cedar Hill High (Cedar Hill, Texas)
- College: Southern Methodist (2016–19); Texas State (2020–21)
- CFL draft: 2022: 6th round, 53rd overall pick

Career history
- 2022–2023: Toronto Argonauts

Awards and highlights
- Grey Cup champion (2022)
- Stats at CFL.ca

Eric Sutton (born September 5, 1998) is a Canadian former professional football defensive back who played for the Toronto Argonauts of the Canadian Football League (CFL).

== Early life ==
Sutton was born in Regina, Saskatchewan, when his father, Eric Sutton, was playing for the Saskatchewan Roughriders. He spent his childhood with his mother in Los Angeles and moved to Miami in middle school where he started playing football. He moved again to Dallas for grade 10 where the high level of coaching that he received led him to focus on professional football aspirations.

== College career ==
Sutton first played college football for the SMU Mustangs from 2016 to 2019. He played in 37 games, starting in five of them, where he had 45 tackles while playing extensively on special teams. He was injured in 2019 which he was able to use as a redshirt season.

In 2020, Sutton transferred to Texas State University in order to play more at the nickelback position. However, he did not play in 2020 due to the COVID-19 pandemic. In 2021, his last season of college eligibility, he played in ten games for the Bobcats where he recorded 22 tackles.

== Professional career ==
Pre-draft measurables
Height	Weight	Bench press
5 ft 9 in (1.75 m)	172 lb (78 kg)	1 reps
All values from CFL Combine

Sutton was drafted in the sixth round, 53rd overall, in the 2022 CFL draft by the Toronto Argonauts and signed with the team on May 10, 2022. Following training camp, he was placed on the team's practice roster, but made his professional debut in the team's second game on June 25, 2022, against the BC Lions, where he had one special teams tackle. He recorded the first two defensive tackles of his career on July 24, 2022, in a game against the Saskatchewan Roughriders and tallied a career-high five total tackles against the Ottawa Redblacks on September 24, 2022.

In 2023, Sutton played in four games and had two defensive tackles. He ended the season on the practice roster and his contract expired on November 13, 2023, after the team's East Final loss.
