= 2021 Texas State Bobcats football team =

American college football season

2021 Texas State Bobcats football
- Conference: Sun Belt Conference
- West Division
- Record: 4–8 (3–5 Sun Belt)
- Head coach: Jake Spavital (3rd season)
- Offensive coordinator: Jacob Peeler (2nd season)
- Offensive scheme: Air raid
- Defensive coordinator: Zac Spavital (3rd season)
- Base defense: 3–4
- Home stadium: Bobcat Stadium

2021 Sun Belt Conference football standings
	Conf.			Overall
Team	W		L	W		L
East Division
Appalachian State xy	7	–	1	10	–	4
Georgia State	6	–	2	8	–	5
Coastal Carolina	6	–	2	11	–	2
Troy	3	–	5	5	–	7
Georgia Southern	2	–	6	3	–	9
West Division
No. 16 Louisiana xy$	8	–	0	13	–	1
Texas State	3	–	5	4	–	8
Louisiana–Monroe	2	–	6	4	–	8
South Alabama	2	–	6	5	–	7
Arkansas State	1	–	7	2	–	10
Championship: Louisiana 24, Appalachian State 16
$ – Conference champion; x – Division champion/co-champions; y – Championship game participant; Rankings from AP Poll

The 2021 Texas State Bobcats football team represented Texas State University as a member of the West Division of the Sun Belt Conference during the 2021 NCAA Division I FBS football season. The Bobcats were led by third-year head coach Jake Spavital and played their home games at Bobcat Stadium in San Marcos, Texas.

== Preseason ==
=== Recruiting class ===
College recruiting
Name	Hometown	School	Height	Weight	40^{‡}	Commit date
Charles Fletcher; OL	Greenville, NC	J. H. Rose HS; NC State	6 ft 2 in (1.88 m)	305 lb (138 kg)	–	Dec 16, 2020
Charles Fletcher; OL	Recruit ratings: Scout: Rivals: 247Sports: ESPN:					
Eric Sutton; DB	Cedar Hill, TX	Cedar Hill HS; SMU	5 ft 10 in (1.78 m)	170 lb (77 kg)	–	Dec 16, 2020
Eric Sutton; DB	Recruit ratings: Scout: Rivals: 247Sports: ESPN:					
DeOnte Washington; DL	Colorado Springs, CO	Vista Ridge HS; Independence CC	6 ft 3 in (1.91 m)	255 lb (116 kg)	–	Dec 16, 2020
DeOnte Washington; DL	Recruit ratings: Scout: Rivals: 247Sports: ESPN:					
Troy Lefeged Jr. DB	Montgomery Village, MD	Northwest HS; Fullerton CC; Utah State	5 ft 11 in (1.80 m)	190 lb (86 kg)	–	Dec 16, 2020
Troy Lefeged Jr. DB	Recruit ratings: Scout: Rivals: 247Sports: ESPN:					
Jeremiah Hawkins; WR	Berkeley, CA	Buena Park HS; UC Berkeley	5 ft 8 in (1.73 m)	175 lb (79 kg)	–	Jan 13, 2021
Jeremiah Hawkins; WR	Recruit ratings: Scout: Rivals: 247Sports: ESPN:					
Liam Dobson; OG	St. Catharines, Canada	Canada Prep; Maine	6 ft 3 in (1.91 m)	330 lb (150 kg)	–	Feb 3, 2021
Liam Dobson; OG	Recruit ratings: Scout: Rivals: 247Sports: ESPN:					
Ty Evans; QB	Monument, CO	Palmer Ridge HS; NC State	6 ft 2 in (1.88 m)	195 lb (88 kg)	–	Feb 3, 2021
Ty Evans; QB	Recruit ratings: Scout: Rivals: 247Sports: ESPN:					
Nick McCann; DT	Texarkana, TX	Arkansas HS; Texas Tech	6 ft 2 in (1.88 m)	275 lb (125 kg)	–	Feb 3, 2021
Nick McCann; DT	Recruit ratings: Scout: Rivals: 247Sports: ESPN:					
Dontye Carriere-Williams; CB	Fort Lauderdale, FL	St. Thomas Aquinas HS; Independence CC; Vanderbilt	5 ft 11 in (1.80 m)	185 lb (84 kg)	–	Feb 3, 2021
Dontye Carriere-Williams; CB	Recruit ratings: Scout: Rivals: 247Sports: ESPN:					
DeMarrquese Hayes; OLB	Waco, TX	La Vega HS; Kansas State	6 ft 1 in (1.85 m)	195 lb (88 kg)	–	Feb 3, 2021
DeMarrquese Hayes; OLB	Recruit ratings: Scout: Rivals: 247Sports: ESPN:					
Kaimana Wa'a; DT	Corvallis, OR	Crescent Valley HS; Hawaii	6 ft 1 in (1.85 m)	285 lb (129 kg)	–	Feb 3, 2021
Kaimana Wa'a; DT	Recruit ratings: Scout: Rivals: 247Sports: ESPN:					

=== Award watch lists ===
Listed in the order that they were released

==== Preseason ====
Award	Player	Position	Year
Doak Walker Award	Brock Sturges	RB	JR
Wuerffel Trophy	Tyler Vitt	QB	SR

=== Sun Belt coaches poll ===
The Sun Belt coaches poll was released on July 20, 2021. The Bobcats were picked to finish fourth in the West Division.

=== Sun Belt Preseason All-Conference teams ===
Offense

2nd team

- Marcell Barbee – Wide receiver, JR

Defense

2nd team

- Nico Ezidore – Defensive lineman, JR

== Personnel ==
2021 Texas State Bobcats football team roster
Players
Coaches
Offense

Pos.	#	Name	Class
WR	1	Javen Banks	Jr
QB	2	Brady McBride	So
WR	3	Waydale Jones	Jr
QB	4	Ty Evans	Fr
RB	5	Brock Sturges	So
WR	6	Donnovan Moorer	Fr
WR	7	Rontavius Groves	Jr
WR	8	Jacoby Hopkins	So
WR	9	Drue Jackson	So
QB	10	Tanner Prewit	So
QB	11	Tyler Vitt	Jr
QB	13	D. J. Bolger	So
WR	14	Trevis Graham Jr.	Jr
WR	15	Blake Aragon	So
WR	16	Ashtyn Hawkins	So
WR	17	Julian Ortega-Jones	Jr
WR	18	Marcell Barbee	Jr
WR	19	Dennis Robinson	Jr
RB	22	Calvin Hill	Fr
WR	24	Caleb Twyford	Sr
WR	27	Kannon Webb	Fr
RB	28	Jahmyl Jeter	So
RB	33	Marquis Brown	So
RB	34	Emmanuel Abdallah	Fr
RB	35	J. T. Lane	Fr
TE	41	Tyler Huff	Jr
TE	42	Blake Simpson	Fr
OL	49	Morgan Moore	So
OL	52	Austin Markiewicz	Fr
OL	53	Eddie Rivas	Jr
OL	54	Matthew Fletcher	Fr
OL	55	Trenton Scott	Fr
OL	56	Ryan McMillan	Fr
OL	60	Kyle Hergel	So
OL	62	Jacob Fryrear	Sr
OL	64	Tristan Simpson	Fr
OL	68	Charles Fletcher	GS
OL	69	Liam Dobson	GS
OL	71	Tate Heitmeier	Jr
OL	72	Alex Costilla	Jr
OL	73	Dalton Cooper	Fr
OL	74	Russell Baker	Jr
OL	75	Silas Robinson	So
OL	76	Kylar Cooks	So
OL	77	Liam Dick	So
OL	78	Nic Fulwider	So
OL	79	Jaydan Smith	So
WR	80	Chandler Speights	Jr
WR	81	Dylan Jantz	Fr
WR	82	Kevin Howard	Jr
TE	83	Micah Hilts	So
TE	84	Seth Caillouet	So
WR	85	Brooks McCoy	Fr
WR	86	Brady Rogers	So
TE	87	Jackson Lanam	So
WR	88	Kenny Frazier	Fr
TE	89	Austin Groeschel	Fr

Defense

Pos.	#	Name	Class
CB	0	Jarron Morris	Jr
S	2	Kevin Anderson	So
CB	3	Kordell Rodgers	Jr
DB	4	Troy Lefeged Jr.	GS
DB	5	D. C. Williams	Sr
ILB	7	Markeveon Coleman	Sr
DB	8	Eric Sutton	GS
LB	9	DeMarrqueze Hayes	Fr
LB	10	Issiah Nixon	Fr
S	11	Zion Childress	Fr
S	13	DeJordan Mask	So
S	14	Tory Spears	So
CB	15	Rodrick Hockley	So
LB	17	Kenny Haynes	Fr
DL	18	Nicholas McCann	GS
LB	20	Devin Martinez	Fr
CB	21	Michael LoVett III	Sr
CB	22	Chris Mills	So
S	23	Peyton Tuggle	Jr
CB	25	Ronnie Hamrick II	Fr
LB	27	London Harris	Jr
S	28	Auston Deason	So
CB	29	Drake Johnson	So
LB	30	Josh Emmanuel	Fr
LB	32	John Emmanuel	Fr
LB	33	Brayden Stringer	Sr
CB	35	Ashton Johnson	So
DB	37	Keyshaun Cooper	Fr
DB	39	Jordan Augustine	Fr
DL	40	Logan Stiba	Fr
LB	42	Nace Washington	Fr
DL	44	Jordan Mitchell	Fr
DL	48	Dotson Schaefer	So
DL	51	Christian Owens	So
DL	53	Ethan Hamby	Fr
LB	54	Aaron Allert	Fr
LB	55	Sione Tupou	Jr
LB	56	Owen McClintock	Fr
LB	57	Zane Little	So
LB	58	Conner Motsinger	Fr
LB	59	Micah Strahan	Fr
DL	88	Caeveon Patton	Sr
DL	90	Jake Lynch	So
DL	91	Jordan Revels	So
DL	92	Samuel Obiang	So
DL	93	DeOnte Washington	So
DL	94	Jaquel Pierce	Sr
DL	95	Nico Ezidore	Jr
DL	96	Davon Sears	Jr
DL	97	Emmanuel Galvan-Vazquez	Jr
DL	98	Gjemar Daniels	Jr
DL	99	Anthony Shipton	Jr

Special teams

Pos.	#	Name	Class
K	36	Mason Shipley	Fr
P	38	David Nunez	Fr
K	43	Seth Keller	So
LS	45	Kaydon Olivia	Fr
LS	46	Durham Harris	Fr
K	47	Jacob Bates	Jr
P	99	Seamus O'Kelly	So

Head coach

- Jake Spavital (Missouri State)

Coordinators/assistant coaches

- Jacob Peeler (Mississippi State)
  Offensive coordinator
- Zac Spavital (Murray State)
  Defensive coordinator
- Nick Whitworth (Idaho State)
  Special teams coordinator/running backs
- Bryson Abraham (Louisiana Tech)
  Wide receivers
- Brett Dewhurst (Texas Tech)
  Defensive backs
- Brian Gamble (Texas A&M)
  Co-defensive coordinator/inside linebackers
- Jacori Greer (New Mexico)
  Defensive line
- Brian Hamilton (SUNY Cortland)
  Tight ends
- Tevin Mims (Texas Tech)
  Outside linebackers
- Jim Turner (Boston College)
  Offensive line
- Boone Feldt (Texas–Permian Basin)
  Offensive graduate assistant
- Jarred Gray (Mississippi)
  Defensive graduate assistant
- Zach McCarthy (Texas State)
  Defensive graduate assistant
- Patrick Doherty (Franklin College)
  Offensive analyst
- Haleigh Blocker
  Director of football operations
- Damon Harrington
  Head strength and conditioning coach
- Jason Russell
  Assistant strength and conditioning coach
- Kyle Vagher
  Strength and conditioning coach
- Jeremy Cobb
  Head football athletic trainer
- Will Decraene
  Assistant athletic trainer
- Andrew Johnson
  Director of equipment operations
- Jake Macauley
  Video coordinator
- Mehrzad Sabzevari
  Assistant video coordinator
- Connor Anderson
  Director of player personnel
- James Sherman
  Director of player development

Legend

- (C) Team captain
- (S) Suspended
- (I) Ineligible
- Injured
- Redshirt

Roster
Last update: 12 July 2021

== Schedule ==
The 2021 schedule consisted of 6 home and 6 away games in the regular season. The Bobcats would travel to Sun Belt foes Georgia State, Louisiana, Coastal Carolina, and Arkansas State. Texas State would play host to Sun Belt foes South Alabama, Troy, Louisiana–Monroe, and Georgia Southern.

Texas State would host two of the four non-conference opponents at Bobcat Stadium, Baylor of the Big 12 Conference and Incarnate Word from the NCAA Division I FCS Southland Conference, and would travel to FIU of the Conference USA and Eastern Michigan of the Mid-American Conference.

Date	Time	Opponent	Site	TV	Result	Attendance
September 4	6:00 p.m.	Baylor*	Bobcat Stadium; San Marcos, TX	ESPN+	L 20–29	26,573
September 11	6:00 p.m.	at FIU*	Riccardo Silva Stadium; Miami, FL	ESPN+	W 23–17 ^{OT}	0
September 18	6:00 p.m.	Incarnate Word*	Bobcat Stadium; San Marcos, TX	ESPN3	L 34–42	16,107
September 25	1:00 p.m.	at Eastern Michigan*	Rynearson Stadium; Ypsilanti, MI	ESPN+	L 21–59	14,253
October 9	6:00 p.m.	South Alabama	Bobcat Stadium; San Marcos, TX	ESPN+	W 33–31 ^{4OT}	16,223
October 16	2:00 p.m.	Troy	Bobcat Stadium; San Marcos, TX	ESPN+	L 28–31	15,083
October 23	1:00 p.m.	at Georgia State	Center Parc Stadium; Atlanta, GA	ESPN+	L 16–28	16,779
October 30	11:00 a.m.	at Louisiana	Cajun Field; Lafayette, LA	ESPNU	L 0–45	28,794
November 6	2:00 p.m.	Louisiana–Monroe^{†}	Bobcat Stadium; San Marcos, TX	ESPN+	W 27–19	16,237
November 13	2:00 p.m.	Georgia Southern	Bobcat Stadium; San Marcos, TX	ESPN+	L 30–38	15,896
November 20	12:00 p.m.	at Coastal Carolina	Brooks Stadium; Conway, SC	ESPN+	L 21–35	10,386
November 27	1:00 p.m.	at Arkansas State	Centennial Bank Stadium; Jonesboro, AR	ESPN+	W 24–22	3,116
*Non-conference game; ^{†}Homecoming; All times are in Central time

== Game summaries ==
=== Baylor ===
Baylor at Texas State

Team	1	2	3	4	Total
• Bears	7	7	10	5	29
Bobcats	3	7	3	7	20

- Date: September 4
- Location: Bobcat Stadium
  San Marcos, Texas
- Game start: 6:00 p.m. CDT
- Elapsed time: 3 hours and 32 minutes
- Game attendance: 26,573
- Game weather: 95 °F (35 °C) • Weather: Sunny • Wind: S 8 MPH
- Referee: Wayne Winkler
- TV announcers (ESPN+): Brant Freeman (play–by–play), Keith Moreland (analyst), and Koral Riggs (sideline reporter)

Scoring summary
1	11:57	BU	JT Woods 20 yard interception, Isaiah Hankins kick	BU 7–0
1	6:02	TXST	Seth Keller 21 yard field goal	BU 7–3
2	6:41	TXST	Marcell Barbee 12 yard pass from Brady McBride, Seth Keller kick	TXST 10–7
2	0:36	BU	Abram Smith 3 yard run, Isaiah Hankins kick	BU 14–10
3	8:50	BU	Isaiah Hankins 43 yard field goal	BU 17–10
3	4:21	BU	Abram Smith 12 yard run, Isaiah Hankins kick	BU 24–10
3	0:45	TXST	Seth Keller 38 yard field goal
4	9:35	BU	Isaiah Hankins 26 yard field goal	BU 27–13
4	1:19	TXST	Jahmyl Jeter 2 yard run, Seth Keller kick	BU 27–20
4	0:00	BU	0 yard safety	BU 29–20

Statistics	BAY	TXST
First downs	22	20
Total yards	386	235
Rushing yards	238	79
Passing yards	148	156
Turnovers	1	3
Time of possession	34:48	25:12

Team	Category	Player	Statistics
Baylor	Passing	Gerry Bohanon	15/24, 148 yards
Baylor	Rushing	Trestan Ebner	20 carries, 120 yards
Baylor	Receiving	R. J. Sneed	6 receptions, 92 yards
Texas State	Passing	Brady McBride	20/40, 156 yards, TD, 3 INT
Texas State	Rushing	Jahmyl Jeter	8 carries, 45 yards, TD
Texas State	Receiving	Marcell Barbee	4 receptions, 56 yards, TD

=== At FIU ===
Texas State at Florida International

Team	1	2	3	4	OT	Total
• Bobcats	7	3	0	7	6	23
Panthers	0	7	10	0	0	17

- Date: September 11
- Location: Riccardo Silva Stadium
  Miami, Florida
- Game start: 6:05 p.m. CDT
- Elapsed time: 3 hours and 34 minutes
- Game attendance: 0
- Game weather: 85 °F (29 °C) • Weather: Cloudy • Wind: E 7 MPH
- Referee: Marshall Lewis
- TV announcers (ESPN+): AJ Ricketts (play–by–play) and Cam Lynch (analyst)

Scoring summary
1	12:14	TXST	Caleb Twyford 17-yard pass from Brady McBride (Seth Keller kick) (7 plays, 76 yards, 2:40)	TXST 7–0
2	02:10	TXST	Seth Keller 48-yard field goal (10 plays, 58 yards, 4:58)	TXST 10–0
2	00:06	FIU	Tyrese Chambers 22-yard pass from Max Bortenschlager (Chase Gabriel kick) (9 plays, 75 yards, 2:04)	TXST 10–7
3	13:04	FIU	Rivaldo Fairweather 34-yard pass from Max Bortenschlager (Chase Gabriel kick) (5 plays, 81 yards, 1:50)	FIU 14–10
3	02:55	FIU	Chase Gabriel 18-yard field goal (5 plays, 46 yards, 2:27)	FIU 17–10
4	10:09	TXST	Brock Sturges 1-yard rush (Seth Keller kick) (10 plays, 62 yards, 4:23)	TIE 17–17
1OT		TXST	Brock Sturges 11-yard rush (2 plays, 25 yards)	TXST 23–17

Statistics	TXST	FIU
First downs	21	21
Total yards	336	400
Rushing yards	171	141
Passing yards	165	259
Turnovers	0	3
Time of possession	31:01	28:59

Team	Category	Player	Statistics
Texas State	Passing	Brady McBride	18/31, 165 yards, TD
Texas State	Rushing	Calvin Hill	14 carries, 72 yards
Texas State	Receiving	Marcell Barbee	8 receptions, 67 yards
FIU	Passing	Max Bortenschlager	17/34, 259 yards, 2 TD
FIU	Rushing	D'Vonte Price	23 carries, 111 yards
FIU	Receiving	Tyrese Chambers	4 receptions, 79 yards, TD

=== Incarnate Word ===
Incarnate Word at Texas State

Team	1	2	3	4	Total
• Cardinals	14	0	14	14	42
Bobcats	7	10	7	10	34

- Date: September 18
- Location: Bobcat Stadium
  San Marcos, Texas
- Game start: 6:05 p.m. CDT
- Elapsed time: 3 hours and 45 minutes
- Game attendance: 16,107
- Game weather: 95 °F (35 °C) • Weather: Sunny • Wind: NE 9 MPH
- Referee: Jeremy Parker
- TV announcers (ESPN3): Brant Freeman (play–by–play), Keith Moreland (analyst), and Koral Riggs (sideline reporter)

Scoring summary
1	09:32	TXST	Jahmyl Jeter 1-yard rush (Seth Keller kick) (5 plays, 29 yards, 1:56)	TXST 7–0
1	06:19	UIW	Kevin Brown 5-yard rush (John Scifers kick) (8 plays, 71 yards, 3:13)	TIE 7–7
1	01:01	UIW	Robert Ferrel 32-yard pass from Cam Ward (John Scifers kick) (8 plays, 63 yards, 2:32)	UIW 14–7
2	08:51	TXST	Jahmyl Jeter 1-yard rush (Seth Keller kick) (16 plays, 78 yards, 7:04)	TIE 14–14
2	01:09	TXST	Seth Keller 33-yard field goal (11 plays, 64 yards, 4:00)	TXST 17–14
3	11:47	UIW	Marcus Cooper 9-yard rush (John Scifers kick) (6 plays, 74 yards, 1:45)	UIW 21–17
3	08:03	TXST	Marcell Barbee 18-yard pass from Brady McBride (Seth Keller kick) (8 plays, 75 yards, 3:44)	TXST 24–21
3	01:35	UIW	Robert Ferrel 14-yard pass from Cameron Ward (John Scifers kick) (8 plays, 48 yards, 4:20)	UIW 28–24
4	11:17	TXST	Marcell Barbee 4-yard pass from Brady McBride (Seth Keller kick) (14 plays, 65 yards, 5:18)	TXST 31–28
4	07:07	UIW	Darion Chafin 8-yard pass from Cameron Ward (John Scifers kick) (7 plays, 30 yards, 2:19)	UIW 35–31
4	02:48	UIW	Taylor Grimes 1-yard pass from Cameron Ward (John Scifers kick) (6 plays, 68 yards, 3:07)	UIW 42–31
4	00:58	TXST	Seth Keller 37-yard field goal (10 plays, 55 yards, 1:50)	UIW 42–34

Statistics	UIW	TXST
First downs	27	26
Total yards	455	448
Rushing yards	79	182
Passing yards	376	278
Turnovers	3	2
Time of possession	27:46	32:14

Team	Category	Player	Statistics
Incarnate Word	Passing	Cam Ward	31/47, 376 yards, 4 TD, INT
Incarnate Word	Rushing	Marcus Cooper	10 carries, 74 yards, TD
Incarnate Word	Receiving	Robert Ferrel	10 receptions, 132 yards, 2 TD
Texas State	Passing	Brady McBride	25/41, 278 yards, 2 TD
Texas State	Rushing	Calvin Hill	16 carries, 78 yards
Texas State	Receiving	Javen Banks	6 receptions, 64 yards

=== At Eastern Michigan ===
Texas State at Eastern Michigan

Team	1	2	3	4	Total
Bobcats	7	7	7	0	21
• Eagles	14	14	10	21	59

- Date: September 25
- Location: Rynearson Stadium
  Ypsilanti, Michigan
- Game start: 1:05 p.m. CDT
- Elapsed time: 3 hours and 21 minutes
- Game attendance: 14,253
- Game weather: 64 °F (18 °C) • Weather: Sunny • Wind: NW 7 MPH
- Referee: Jeremy Valentine
- TV announcers (ESPN+): Anthony Lima (play–by–play) and Marcus Ray (analyst)

Scoring summary
1	08:06	EMU	Samson Evans 4-yard rush (Chad Ryland kick) (10 plays, 66 yards, 4:47)	EMU 7–0
1	03:23	EMU	Ben Bryant 39-yard rush (Chad Ryland kick) (6 plays, 85 yards, 2:12)	EMU 14–0
1	01:36	TXST	Javen Banks 5-yard pass from Brady McBride (Seth Keller kick) (5 plays, 38 yards, 1:37)	EMU 14–7
2	13:30	EMU	Dylan Drummond 12-yard pass from Ben Bryant (Chad Ryland kick) (8 plays, 74 yards, 2:49)	EMU 21–7
2	03:21	EMU	Thomas Odukoya 13-yard pass from Dylan Drummond (Chad Ryland kick) (7 plays, 55 yards, 2:32)	EMU 28–7
2	01:24	TXST	Trevis Graham Jr. 29-yard pass from Brady McBride (Seth Keller kick) (8 plays, 75 yards, 1:50)	EMU 28–14
3	10:56	TXST	Javen Banks 29-yard pass from Brady McBride (Seth Keller kick) (6 plays, 77 yards, 2:42)	EMU 28–21
3	08:14	EMU	Jawon Hamilton 22-yard rush (Chad Ryland kick) (6 plays, 57 yards, 2:35)	EMU 35–21
3	02:43	EMU	Chad Ryland 36-yard field goal (5 plays, 12 yards, 2:32)	EMU 38–21
4	12:16	EMU	Latrell Fordham 24-yard pass from Ben Bryant (Chad Ryland kick) (7 plays, 66 yards, 3:01)	EMU 45–21
4	08:08	EMU	Hassan Beydoun 4-yard pass from Ben Bryant (Chad Ryland kick) (5 plays, 27 yards, 2:19)	EMU 52–21
4	01:09	EMU	Samson Evans 2-yard rush (Chad Ryland kick) (9 plays, 54 yards, 5:44)	EMU 59–21

Statistics	TXST	EMU
First downs	18	33
Total yards	299	499
Rushing yards	112	242
Passing yards	187	257
Turnovers	1	0
Time of possession	25:52	34:08

Team	Category	Player	Statistics
Texas State	Passing	Brady McBride	16/25, 187 yards, 3 TD
Texas State	Rushing	Brock Sturges	14 carries, 68 yards
Texas State	Receiving	Trevis Graham Jr.	4 receptions, 69 yards, TD
Eastern Michigan	Passing	Ben Bryant	20/33, 228 yards, 3 TD
Eastern Michigan	Rushing	Darius Boone Jr.	13 carries, 86 yards
Eastern Michigan	Receiving	Dylan Drummond	5 receptions, 59 yards, TD

=== South Alabama ===
South Alabama at Texas State

Team	1	2	3	4	OT	2OT	3OT	4OT	Total
Jaguars	0	17	0	7	7	0	0	0	31
• Bobcats	7	0	3	14	7	0	0	2	33

- Date: October 9
- Location: Bobcat Stadium
  San Marcos, Texas
- Game start: 7:00 p.m. CDT
- Game attendance: 16,223
- Game weather: Sunny
- Referee: Jeremy Parker
- TV announcers (ESPN+): Brant Freeman (play–by–play), Keith Moreland (analyst), and Koral Riggs (sideline reporter)

Scoring summary
1	14:04	TXST	Javen Banks 57-yard pass from Brady McBride (Seth Keller kick) (3 plays, 76 yards, 0:51)	TXST 7–0
2	14:56	USA	AJ Phillips 6-yard rush (Diego Guajardo kick) (3 plays, 43 yards, 0:59)	TIE 7–7
2	08:04	USA	Diego Guajardo 35-yard field goal (7 plays, 40 yards, 2:49)	USA 10–7
2	00:02	USA	Lincoln Sefcik 1-yard pass from Jake Bentley (Diego Guajardo kick) (8 plays, 32 yards, 1:42)	USA 17–7
3	03:54	TXST	Seth Keller 43-yard field goal (6 plays, 35 yards, 3:48)	USA 17–10
4	14:12	USA	AJ Phillips 5-yard rush (Diego Guajardo kick) (9 plays, 75 yards, 4:42)	USA 24–10
4	07:17	TXST	Brady McBride 13-yard pass from Brady McBride (Seth Keller kick) (9 plays, 41 yards, 5:17)	USA 24–17
4	00:17	TXST	Jahmyl Jeter 1-yard rush (Seth Keller kick) (13 plays, 85 yards, 3:00)	TIE 24–24
1OT		USA	Jalen Tolbert 12-yard pass from Jake Bentley (Diego Guajardo kick) (6 plays, 25 yards)	USA 31–24
1OT		TXST	Brock Sturges 4-yard rush (Seth Keller kick) (7 plays, 25 yards)	TIE 31–31
4OT		TXST	Brady McBride two-point conversion rush	TXST 33–31

Statistics	USA	TXST
First downs	20	23
Total yards	329	399
Rushing yards	140	212
Passing yards	189	187
Turnovers	3	3
Time of possession	28:24	31:36

Team	Category	Player	Statistics
South Alabama	Passing	Jake Bentley	19/26, 189 yards, 2 TD, INT
South Alabama	Rushing	AJ Phillips	19 carries, 74 yards, 2 TD
South Alabama	Receiving	Jalen Tolbert	5 receptions, 84 yards, TD
Texas State	Passing	Brady McBride	18/28, 187 yards, 2 TD, 3 INT
Texas State	Rushing	Calvin Hill	11 carries, 70 yards
Texas State	Receiving	Javen Banks	4 receptions, 104 yards, TD

=== Troy ===
Troy at Texas State

Team	1	2	3	4	Total
• Trojans	10	7	7	7	31
Bobcats	7	7	14	0	28

- Date: October 16
- Location: Bobcat Stadium
  San Marcos, Texas
- Game start: 2:05 p.m. CDT
- Elapsed time: 3 hours and 3 minutes
- Game attendance: 15,083
- Game weather: 72 °F (22 °C) • Weather: Sunny • Wind: NE 13 MPH
- Referee: Wayne Winkler
- TV announcers (ESPN+): Brant Freeman (play–by–play) and Keith Moreland (analyst)

Scoring summary
1	09:47	TROY	Brooks Buce 34-yard field goal (8 plays, 54 yards, 1:58)	TROY 3–0
1	05:42	TROY	Kimani Vidal 45-yard rush (Brooks Buce kick) (2 plays, 66 yards, 0:28)	TROY 10–0
1	00:18	TXST	Brock Sturges 2-yard rush (Seth Keller kick) (5 plays, 39 yards, 1:25)	TROY 10–7
2	12:58	TROY	Tez Johnson 33-yard pass from Gunnar Watson (Brooks Buce kick) (7 plays, 75 yards, 2:20)	TROY 17–7
2	12:18	TXST	Javen Banks 75-yard pass from Brady McBride (Seth Keller kick) (2 plays, 75 yards, 0:40)	TROY 17–14
3	06:19	TROY	Kimani Vidal 1-yard rush (Brooks Buce kick) (4 plays, 36 yards, 1:06)	TROY 24–14
3	03:32	TXST	Ashtyn Hawkins 2-yard pass from Brady McBride (Seth Keller kick) (7 plays, 70 yards, 2:42)	TROY 24–21
3	01:09	TXST	Trevis Graham Jr. 21-yard pass from Brady McBride (Seth Keller kick) (7 plays, 54 yards, 2:22)	TXST 28–24
4	08:18	TROY	Keyshawn Swanson 33-yard interception returned (Brooks Buce kick) (5 plays, 19 yards, 1:37)	TROY 31–28

Statistics	TROY	TXST
First downs	23	21
Total yards	387	370
Rushing yards	205	91
Passing yards	182	279
Turnovers	0	4
Time of possession	31:09	28:51

Team	Category	Player	Statistics
Troy	Passing	Gunnar Watson	22/29, 182 yards, TD
Troy	Rushing	Kimani Vidal	25 carries, 162 yards, 2 TD
Troy	Receiving	Tez Johnson	9 receptions, 81 yards, TD
Texas State	Passing	Brady McBride	22/32, 279 yards, 3 TD, 3 INT
Texas State	Rushing	Brock Sturges	11 carries, 49 yards, TD
Texas State	Receiving	Javen Banks	4 receptions, 96 yards, TD

=== At Georgia State ===
Texas State at Georgia State

Team	1	2	3	4	Total
Bobcats	6	7	3	0	16
• Panthers	7	7	7	7	28

- Date: October 23
- Location: Center Parc Stadium
  Atlanta, Georgia
- Game start: 1:04 p.m. CDT
- Elapsed time: 3 hours and 40 minutes
- Game attendance: 16,779
- Game weather: 72 °F (22 °C) • Weather: Sunny • Wind: NW 2 MPH
- Referee: Marshall Lewis
- TV announcers (ESPN+): Matt Stewart (play–by–play) and Sam Crenshaw (analyst)

Scoring summary
1	11:02	TXST	Seth Keller 42-yard field goal (12 plays, 39 yards, 3:58)	TXST 3–0
1	07:02	TXST	Seth Keller 42-yard field goal (10 plays, 50 yards, 3:06)	TXST 6–0
1	00:54	GSU	Jamyest Williams 18-yard rush (Noel Ruiz kick) (7 plays, 99 yards, 2:30)	GSU 7–6
2	14:30	GSU	Jamari Thrash 35-yard pass from Darren Grainger (Noel Ruiz kick) (3 plays, 53 yards, 0:31)	GSU 14–6
2	09:46	TXST	Brady McBride 8-yard rush (Seth Keller kick) (12 plays, 68 yards, 4:44)	GSU 14–13
3	08:10	GSU	Jamyest Williams 28-yard rush (Noel Ruiz kick) (7 plays, 67 yards, 2:24)	GSU 21–13
3	03:57	TXST	Seth Keller 31-yard field goal (11 plays, 66 yards, 4:13)	GSU 21–16
3	14:54	GSU	Aubry Payne 27-yard pass from Darren Grainger (Noel Ruiz kick) (11 plays, 75 yards, 4:03)	GSU 28–16

Statistics	TXST	GAST
First downs	26	26
Total yards	378	483
Rushing yards	123	283
Passing yards	255	200
Turnovers	2	1
Time of possession	32:23	27:37

Team	Category	Player	Statistics
Texas State	Passing	Brady McBride	27/47, 255 yards, INT
Texas State	Rushing	Brady McBride	17 carries, 46 yards, TD
Texas State	Receiving	Ashtyn Hawkins	6 receptions, 108 yards
Georgia State	Passing	Darren Grainger	16/25, 200 yards, 2 TD
Georgia State	Rushing	Tucker Gregg	21 carries, 115 yards
Georgia State	Receiving	Jamari Thrash	4 receptions, 74 yards, TD

=== At Louisiana ===
Texas State at Louisiana

Team	1	2	3	4	Total
Bobcats	0	0	0	0	0
• Ragin' Cajuns	0	17	18	10	45

- Date: October 30
- Location: Cajun Field
  Lafayette, Louisiana
- Game start: 11:02 a.m. CDT
- Elapsed time: 3 hours and 5 minutes
- Game attendance: 28,794
- Game weather: 65 °F (18 °C) • Weather: Sunny • Wind: NW 9 MPH
- Referee: Trennis Livingston
- TV announcers (ESPNU): Kevin Brown (play–by–play) and Hutson Mason (analyst)

Scoring summary
2	14:55	LA	Chris Smith 2-yard pass from Levi Lewis (Nate Snyder kick) (14 plays, 68 yards, 5:25)	LA 7–0
2	03:06	LA	Hunter Bergeron 1-yard pass from Levi Lewis (Nate Snyder kick) (7 plays, 63 yards, 3:21)	LA 14–0
2	00:01	LA	Nate Snyder 45-yard field goal (7 plays, 41 yards, 1:51)	LA 17–0
3	11:38	LA	Nate Snyder 32-yard field goal (8 plays, 60 yards, 3:22)	LA 20–0
3	04:50	LA	Jalen Williams 3-yard pass from Levi Lewis (Levi Lewis two-point conversion pass to Peter LeBlanc) (6 plays, 51 yards, 2:19)	LA 28–0
3	01:10	LA	Chris Smith 3-yard rush (Nate Snyder kick) (6 plays, 54 yards, 2:02)	LA 35–0
4	14:44	LA	Nate Snyder 37-yard field goal (4 plays, -8 yards, 0:28)	LA 38–0
4	00:59	LA	T. J. Wisham 3-yard rush (Nate Snyder kick) (13 plays, 88 yards, 7:58)	LA 45–0

Statistics	TXST	ULL
First downs	10	24
Total yards	205	425
Rushing yards	163	165
Passing yards	42	260
Turnovers	3	0
Time of possession	28:47	31:13

Team	Category	Player	Statistics
Texas State	Passing	Tyler Vitt	6/13, 42 yards, INT
Texas State	Rushing	Tyler Vitt	15 carries, 94 yards
Texas State	Receiving	Marcell Barbee	1 reception, 17 yards
Louisiana	Passing	Levi Lewis	22/32, 228 yards, 3 TD
Louisiana	Rushing	Chris Smith	9 carries, 70 yards, TD
Louisiana	Receiving	Errol Rogers Jr.	3 receptions, 44 yards

=== Louisiana–Monroe ===
Louisiana–Monroe at Texas State

Team	1	2	3	4	Total
Warhawks	6	10	3	0	19
• Bobcats	10	10	0	7	27

- Date: November 6
- Location: Bobcat Stadium
  San Marcos, Texas
- Game start: 2:05 p.m. CDT
- Elapsed time: 3 hours and 15 minutes
- Game attendance: 16,237
- Game weather: 67 °F (19 °C) • Weather: Sunny • Wind: E 3 MPH
- Referee: Wayne Winkler
- TV announcers (ESPN+): Brant Freeman (play–by–play), Keith Moreland (analyst), and Koral Riggs (sideline reporter)

Scoring summary
1	08:12	TXST	Seth Keller 42-yard field goal (11 plays, 73 yards, 3:41)	TXST 3–0
1	02:58	ULM	Andrew Henry 1-yard rush (Calum Sutherland PAT failed) (12 plays, 72 yards, 5:14)	ULM 6–3
1	01:11	TXST	Javen Banks 49-yard pass from Tyler Vitt (Seth Keller kick) (5 plays, 75 yards, 1:47)	TXST 10–6
2	10:04	ULM	Calum Sutherland 52-yard field goal (12 plays, 40 yards, 6:07)	TXST 10–9
2	05:58	TXST	Caleb Twyford 1-yard rush (Seth Keller kick) (9 plays, 75 yards, 4:06)	TXST 17–9
2	02:02	ULM	Chandler Rogers 10-yard rush (Calum Sutherland kick) (9 plays, 75 yards, 3:56)	TXST 17–16
2	00:54	TXST	Seth Keller 43-yard field goal (9 plays, 49 yards, 1:08)	TXST 20–16
3	10:13	ULM	Calum Sutherland 45-yard field goal (13 plays, 47 yards, 4:47)	TXST 20–19
4	01:43	TXST	Jahmyl Jeter 26-yard rush (Seth Keller kick) (4 plays, 40 yards, 0:59)	TXST 27–19

Statistics	ULM	TXST
First downs	28	19
Total yards	432	434
Rushing yards	170	172
Passing yards	262	262
Turnovers	0	0
Time of possession	38:02	21:58

Team	Category	Player	Statistics
Louisiana–Monroe	Passing	Chandler Rogers	28/43, 262 yards
Louisiana–Monroe	Rushing	Andrew Henry	23 carries, 82 yards, TD
Louisiana–Monroe	Receiving	Will Derrick	6 receptions, 74 yards
Texas State	Passing	Tyler Vitt	16/31, 262 yards, TD
Texas State	Rushing	Jahyml Jeter	16 carries, 92 yards, TD
Texas State	Receiving	Marcell Barbee	5 receptions, 102 yards

=== Georgia Southern ===
Georgia Southern at Texas State

Team	1	2	3	4	Total
• Eagles	3	14	14	7	38
Bobcats	0	17	7	6	30

- Date: November 13
- Location: Bobcat Stadium
  San Marcos, Texas
- Game start: 2:05 p.m. CST
- Elapsed time: 3 hours and 57 minutes
- Game attendance: 15,896
- Game weather: 70 °F (21 °C) • Weather: Sunny • Wind: S 3 mph
- Referee: Marshall Lewis
- TV announcers (ESPN+): Brant Freeman (play–by–play), Keith Moreland (analyst), and Koral Riggs (sideline reporter)

Scoring summary
1	5:09	GASO	Alex Raynor 24 yd field goal (11 plays, 78 yards, 4:54)	GASO 3–0
2	12:04	TXST	Calvin Hill 13 yd run (Seth Keller kick) (8 plays, 69 yards, 2:38)	TXST 7–3
2	7:59	GASO	Jalen White 19 yd run (Alex Raynor kick) (10 plays, 75 yards, 4:05)	GASO 10–7
2	5:55	GASO	Derwin Burgess Jr. 48 yd pass from Cam Ransom (Alex Raynor kick) (3 plays, 63 yards, 1:16)	GASO 17–7
2	1:17	TXST	Seth Keller 45 yd field goal (4 plays, 5 yards, 1:25)	GASO 17–10
2	0:02	TXST	Kenny Haynes 0 yd punt return (Seth Keller kick) (5 plays, 13 yards, 1:15)	TIE 17–17
3	11:16	GASO	Tyrell Davis 20 yd punt return (Alex Raynor kick) (3 plays, 2 yards, 0:44)	GASO 24–17
3	5:44	TXST	Jahmyl Jeter 1 yd run (Seth Keller kick) (6 plays, 45 yards, 2:02)	TIE 24–24
3	1:53	GASO	Beau Johnson 25 yd pass from Justin Tomlin (Alex Raynor kick) (2 plays, 25 yards, 0:10)	GASO 31–24
4	9:15	TXST	Seth Keller 33 yd field goal (8 plays, 36 yards, 2:59)	GASO 31–27
4	5:30	GASO	Jalen White 5 yd run (Alex Raynor kick) (8 plays, 75 yards, 3:38)	GASO 38–27
4	1:10	TXST	Seth Keller 34 yd field goal (10 plays, 56 yards, 2:21)	TXST 38–30

Statistics	GASO	TXST
First downs	19	26
Total yards	395	341
Rushing yards	162	78
Passing yards	233	263
Turnovers	1	2
Time of possession	28:08	31:52

Team	Category	Player	Statistics
Georgia Southern	Passing	Cam Ransom	7/12, 125 yards, TD
Georgia Southern	Rushing	Jalen White	10 carries, 82 yards, 2 TD
Georgia Southern	Receiving	Derwin Burgess Jr.	5 receptions, 134 yards, TD
Texas State	Passing	Tyler Vitt	29/46, 263 yards, INT
Texas State	Rushing	Calvin Hill	10 carries, 43 yards, TD
Texas State	Receiving	Marcell Barbee	4 receptions, 63 yards

=== At Coastal Carolina ===
Texas State at Coastal Carolina

Team	1	2	3	4	Total
Bobcats	0	14	7	0	21
• Chanticleers	7	7	14	7	35

- Date: November 20
- Location: Brooks Stadium
  Conway, South Carolina
- Game start: 1:05 p.m. CST
- Elapsed time: 3 hours and 11 minutes
- Game attendance: 10,386
- Game weather: 60 °F (16 °C) • Weather: Sunny • Wind:
- Referee: Trennis Livingston
- TV announcers (ESPN+): Jeff McCarragher (play–by–play) and Nate Ross (analyst)

Scoring summary
1	3:57	CCU	Kameron Brown 19 yd pass from Grayson McCall (Massimo Biscardi kick) (12 plays, 83 yards, 6:19)	CCU 7–0
2	6:27	CCU	Jaivon Heiligh 5 yd pass from McCall (Massimo Biscardi kick) (5 plays, 28 yards, 1:38)	CCU 14–0
2	1:46	TXST	Jahmyl Jeter 1 yd run (Seth Keller kick) (10 plays, 75 yards, 4:41)	CCU 14–7
2	0:00	TXST	Calvin Hill 54 yd run (Seth Keller kick) (4 plays, 69 yards, 0:23)	TIE 14–14
3	12:21	CCU	Kameron Brown 52 yd pass from Grayson McCall (Massimo Biscardi kick) (4 plays, 62 yards, 1:32)	CCU 21–14
3	9:48	TXST	Marcell Barbee 38 yd pass from Tyler Vitt (Seth Keller kick) (4 plays, 64 yards, 2:23)	TIE 21–21
3	4:45	CCU	Isaiah Likely 21 yd pass from Grayson McCall (Massimo Biscardi kick) (10 plays, 75 yards, 5:03)	CCU 28–21
4	8:23	CCU	Tyson Mobley 39 yd pass from Grayson McCall (Massimo Biscardi kick) (4 plays, 68 yards, 1:59)	CCU 35–21

Statistics	TXST	CCU
First downs	17	30
Total yards	301	498
Rushing yards	195	179
Passing yards	106	319
Turnovers	0	0
Time of possession	24:54	35:06

Team	Category	Player	Statistics
Texas State	Passing	Tyler Vitt	13/26, 106 yards, TD
Texas State	Rushing	Calvin Hill	12 carries, 100 yards, TD
Texas State	Receiving	Ashtyn Hawkins	2 receptions, 41 yards
Coastal Carolina	Passing	Grayson McCall	22/28, 319 yards, 5 TD
Coastal Carolina	Rushing	Shermari Jones	23 carries, 92 yards
Coastal Carolina	Receiving	Jaivon Heiligh	10 receptions, 101 yards, TD

=== At Arkansas State ===
Texas State at Arkansas State

Team	1	2	3	4	Total
• Bobcats	14	3	7	0	24
Red Wolves	7	3	3	9	22

- Date: November 27
- Location: Centennial Bank Stadium
  Jonesboro, Arkansas
- Game start: 1:05 CST
- Elapsed time: 3 hours and 15 minutes
- Game attendance: 3,116
- Game weather: 57 °F (14 °C) • Weather: Sunny • Wind: SSW 13 mph
- Referee: Wayne Winkler
- TV announcers (ESPN+): Brad Bobo (play–by–play), Pete Cordelli (analyst), and Cori Keller (sideline reporter)

Scoring summary
1	10:38	TXST	Jahmyl Jeter 4 yd run (Seth Keller kick) (10 plays, 75 yards, 4:22)	TXST 7–0
1	8:21	ARST	Dahu Green 39 yd pass from Layne Hatcher (Blake Grupe kick) (5 plays, 71 yards, 2:10)	TIE 7–7
1	5:47	TXST	Trevis Graham Jr. 31 yd pass from Tyler Vitt (Seth Keller kick) (6 plays, 67 yards, 2:22)	TXST 14–7
2	8:26	ARST	Blake Grupe 23 yd field goal (14 plays, 81 yards, 4:59)	TXST 14–10
2	3:09	TXST	Seth Keller 46 yd field goal (5 plays, 15 yards, 1:31)	TXST 17–10
3	10:43	ARST	Blake Grupe 22 yd field goal (10 plays, 70 yards, 4:17)	TXST 17–13
3	8:06	TXST	Calvin Hill 6 yd run (Seth Keller kick) (6 plays, 83 yards, 2:28)	TXST 24–13
4	12:17	ARST	Blake Grupe 22 yd field goal (11 plays, 55 yards, 5:16)	TXST 24–16
4	2:12	ARST	Corey Rucker 26 yd pass from Layne Hatcher (2-point pass conversion failed) (8 plays, 86 yards, 4:06)	TXST 24–22

Statistics	TXST	ARST
First downs	14	25
Total yards	333	471
Rushing yards	203	194
Passing yards	130	277
Turnovers	0	0
Time of possession	24:51	35:09

Team	Category	Player	Statistics
Texas State	Passing	Tyler Vitt	11/25, 121 yards, TD
Texas State	Rushing	Calvin Hill	13 carries, 125 yards, TD
Texas State	Receiving	Trevis Graham Jr.	4 receptions, 67 yards, TD
Arkansas State	Passing	Layne Hatcher	25/37, 277 yards, 2 TD
Arkansas State	Rushing	Alan Lamar	12 carries, 88 yards
Arkansas State	Receiving	Corey Rucker	8 receptions, 85 yards, TD
