= Jake Spavital =

American football player and coach (born 1985)

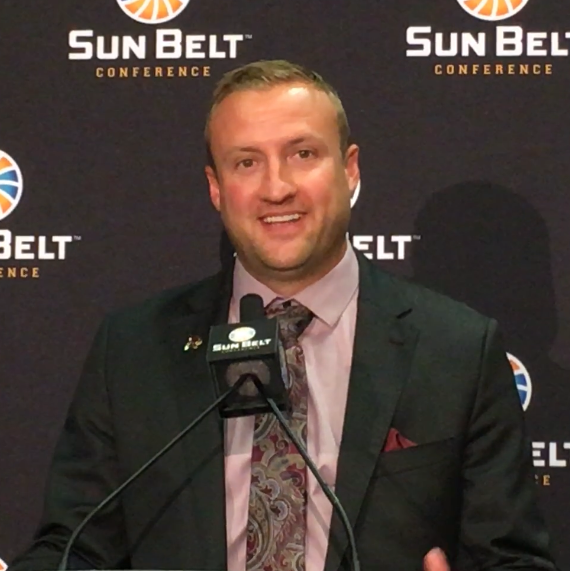
- Spavital at 2019 Sun Belt Media Day

Current position
- Title: Offensive coordinator, quarterbacks coach
- Team: Baylor
- Conference: Big 12

Biographical details
- Born: May 1, 1985 (age 41); Tulsa, Oklahoma, U.S.

Playing career
- 2006–2007: Missouri State
- Positions: Quarterback, punter

Coaching career (HC unless noted)
- 2008: Tulsa (OQC)
- 2009: Houston (GA)
- 2010: Oklahoma State (GA)
- 2011–2012: West Virginia (QB)
- 2013: Texas A&M (co-OC/QB)
- 2014–2015: Texas A&M (OC/QB)
- 2016: California (OC/QB)
- 2017–2018: West Virginia (OC/QB)
- 2019–2022: Texas State
- 2023: California (OC/QB)
- 2024–present: Baylor (OC/QB)

Head coaching record
- Overall: 13–35

Jacob Stephen Spavital (born May 1, 1985) is an American college football coach who is the offensive coordinator for the Baylor Bears. He served as the head coach at Texas State University from 2019 to 2022.

== Coaching career ==
=== Early coaching career ===
Following his playing career at Missouri State University, Spavital became a member of the coaching staff at Tulsa in 2008 where he worked as an offensive quality control assistant under Gus Malzahn. Following the 2008 season Spavital became a graduate assistant at Houston. While at Houston, Spavital worked under head coach Kevin Sumlin and offensive coordinator Dana Holgorsen. Spavital became familiar with Holgorsen's offense while working at Houston, and when Holgorsen became the offensive coordinator at Oklahoma State in 2010 he took Spavital with him and gave him the same position of graduate assistant. Spavital was an essential piece of Holgorsen's coaching staff at Oklahoma State because he was the only person on the staff familiar with the offense that Holgorsen ran. Spavital helped teach the new offense to QB Brandon Weeden, who was nearly two years older than Spavital. That season, Oklahoma State went 11–2 and Weeden was third in the nation in yards per game and total yards as well as sixth in the nation in touchdowns.

When Holgorsen became head coach at West Virginia before the 2011 season, he took Spavital with him and made him quarterbacks coach. While at West Virginia, Spavital coached Geno Smith. Under Spavital's coaching Smith would break numerous WVU, NCAA, and bowl records.

When Texas A&M offensive coordinator Kliff Kingsbury left Texas A&M to become the head coach at Texas Tech, A&M head coach Kevin Sumlin offered Spavital the position. At Texas A&M, Spavital started as the co-offensive coordinator with Clarence McKinney and was the quarterbacks coach. In the 2013 season, he coached Heisman Trophy winner Johnny Manziel.

On January 3, 2016, Spavital and Texas A&M mutually parted ways, partially due to the Kyler Murray/Kyle Allen quarterback controversy during the 2015 season that saw both highly rated QBs transfer out of A&M the same season.

On February 11, 2016, Spavital was announced as the offensive coordinator and quarterbacks coach for the California Golden Bears football team. On January 8, 2017, following the firing of head coach Sonny Dykes, it was announced that Spavital would serve as interim head coach at Cal.

On January 13, 2017, it was announced that Spavital would be returning to West Virginia as offensive coordinator, rejoining Holgorsen and offensive line coach Joe Wickline, who he coached with while with Holgorsen at Oklahoma State.

=== Texas State ===
On November 28, 2018, Spavital was named the head coach at Texas State, taking over for Everett Withers. On August 29, 2019, Spavital and Texas State lost to No. 12 ranked Texas A&M 41–7 in Spavital's first game as head coach. On September 21, Spavital recorded his first win as a head coach when his Bobcats defeated Georgia State, 37–34, in 3 OTs.

Texas State fired Spavital following the 2022 season. In four years, Spavital's teams went 13–35 overall and did not appear in a bowl game.

=== Return to California ===
On December 6, 2022, Spavital was rehired as the offensive coordinator and quarterbacks coach at California, now under head coach Justin Wilcox.

=== Baylor ===
On November 30, 2023, Spavital was named offensive coordinator at Baylor, under head coach Dave Aranda.

== Personal ==
Spavital's grandfather, Jim Spavital, was a professional football player who played in the All-America Football Conference (AAFC), National Football League (NFL), and the Canadian Football League (CFL) and later worked as a coach. His father is Steve Spavital, who is a former head football coach at Broken Arrow High School. His brother, Zac Spavital, was the defensive coordinator under him at Texas State.

== Head coaching record ==
Year	Team	Overall	Conference	Standing	Bowl/playoffs
Texas State Bobcats (Sun Belt Conference) (2019–2022)
2019	Texas State	3–9	2–6	4th (West)	
2020	Texas State	2–10	2–6	T–3rd (West)	
2021	Texas State	4–8	3–5	2nd (West)	
2022	Texas State	4–8	2–6	6th (West)	
Texas State:		13–35	9–23		
Total:		13–35			
