= Christian Heritage School (Dalton, Georgia) =

Private K-12 Christian school in Dalton, Georgia, United States

Location
- Dalton, Georgia, United States; 40.7031°N 78.5384°W

Information
- Type: Private; Christian
- Established: 1986
- Enrollment: ~585
- Website: www.chslions.com

Christian Heritage School is a private K-12 Christian school located in Dalton, Georgia, United States. The school was founded in 1986. As of 2019, the total student population was over 500.

== Sports ==
Most of Christian Heritage's sports programs are within the Georgia Independent School Association, and several of their sports teams, including those for softball, basketball, and soccer, have won state titles. The first state title won by the Lions basketball team was in 2005. They finished the season 33–5. The varsity football team won State in the Georgia Football League (GFC-GFL) in 2008.

Christian Heritage offers these sports to students:

- Soccer - varsity boys and girls
- Volleyball - middle school & varsity
- Football - middle school & varsity
- Basketball - middle school, JV, & varsity, boys and girls
- Cheerleading - middle school & varsity
- Baseball - middle school & varsity
- Softball - high school
- Tennis - middle school & varsity, girls and boys
- Golf - varsity
- Fishing - middle school & varsity
- wrestling
- cross country
