= Valwood School =

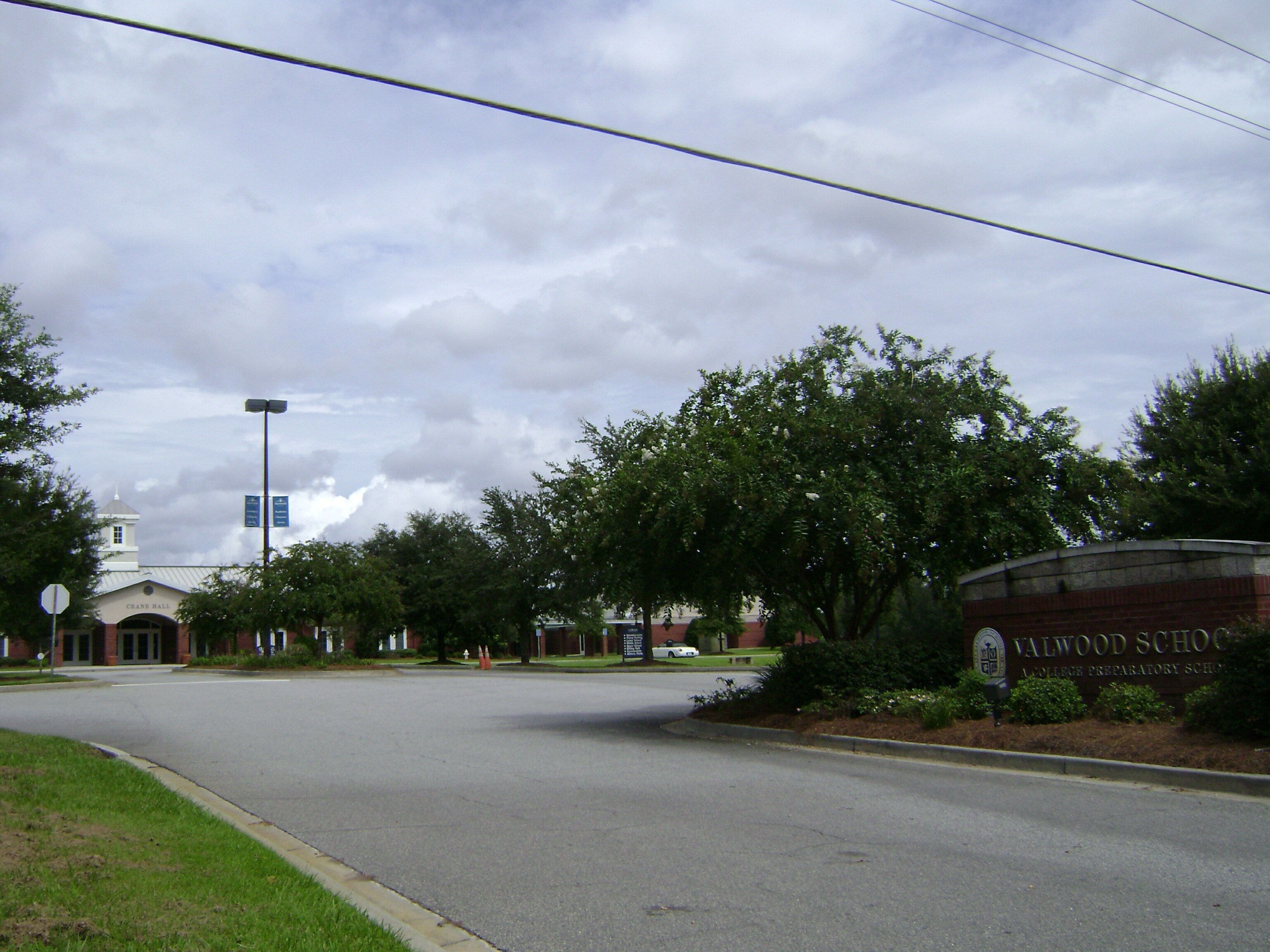

Location
- 4380 Old U.S. Highway 41; Hahira, Georgia 31632
- Coordinates: 30.896°N 83.326°W

Information
- Motto: "Academics, Character, Service"
- Established: 1968
- Headmaster: John Davis
- Teaching staff: 40.8 (on an FTE basis)
- Enrollment: 420 (2021–22)
- Student to teacher ratio: 10.3
- Campus size: 45 acres (18 ha)
- Colors: Orange and navy
- Athletics conference: 3-AAA
- Mascot: Valiant
- Website: www.valwood.org

Valwood School is an independent, coeducational, college preparatory school located four miles (6.4 km) outside of Valdosta, Georgia, United States. It offers programs from pre-kindergarten through high school. There were 420 students enrolled in the 2021–2022 school year, 85% of them White.

== History ==
Valwood School was founded as a segregation academy by local white people in response to the federally mandated racial desegregation of public schools. Valwood's first classes were inaugurated in September 1969, in the old Central Elementary School building in Valdosta. Classes were offered to white students for grades 1-10, with kindergarten and eleventh grade programs being added in 1970. The first full graduation exercise was held in June, 1972, and the school moved to Gornto Road in the fall of that year. A preschool program was added in 1982. Various improvements to the physical plant were completed over the years, including a gymnasium/cafeteria complex in 1973 and an athletic field in 1989. In 2000, the school received a gift of 45 acres (18 ha) of pecan grove from the Howard Dasher Company as a relocation site. The school opened its new campus at the location, two miles (3 km) north of Valdosta on Old US Hwy 41, on August 26, 2002.

== Accreditation and memberships ==
- The National Association of Independent Schools
- The Southern Association of Independent Schools
- The National Association for College Admission Counseling
- The Southern Association for College Admission Counseling
- The Georgia Independent School Association
- Quality by the Georgia Accrediting Commission Member

== Libraries ==
The students and faculty at Valwood are served by two libraries. The Corker Giles Library, which is located in the Crane Hall administration building serves the school's Middle and Upper School students in a variety of capacities: as a library, a classroom, a meeting space, and a computer lab. College recruiters and guest speakers use the Corker Giles library when visiting the school, and guest authors use Skype to share their books with the students. Corker Giles library underwent a massive reconfiguration under the guidance of Dr. Darren Pascavage, who had a vision of a Learning Commons for the school.

The Turner Library, located in Foy Anderson Hall, serves the school's Lower School population, which encompasses Pre-K through Fifth grade. Library curriculum includes GALILEO research, Keyboarding, Google apps as well as themed based literature units. The Lower School students participate in the Georgia Book Award program each year, as well as an activity filled Read Across America Week each March. Turner Library is also used as a meeting space for groups such as Odyssey of the Mind, as well as individual tutoring.

== Athletics ==
Valwood is a member of the Georgia Independent School Association (GISA) and currently competes in region 3-AAA.

The Valiants football team were the GISA Class A Champions in 1985, 1986, 1999, GISA Class AA Champions in 2012, and GISA Class AAA Champions in 2015 and 2017. The men's tennis team has won four GISA titles: 1992, 2000, 2001, and 2002. The women's tennis team has won four GISA titles: 2001, 2002, 2003, and 2014.
