= 2022 Hawaii Rainbow Warriors football team =

American college football season

2022 Hawaii Rainbow Warriors football
- Conference: Mountain West Conference
- West Division
- Record: 3–10 (2–6 MW)
- Head coach: Timmy Chang (1st season)
- Offensive coordinator: Ian Shoemaker (1st season)
- Offensive scheme: Spread
- Defensive coordinator: Jacob Yoro (2nd season)
- Base defense: 4–2–5/Desert Swarm
- Captains: Penei Pavihi; Dedrick Parson; Blessman Ta'ala; Eliki Tanuvasa
- Home stadium: Clarence T. C. Ching Athletics Complex

2022 Mountain West Conference football standings
	Conf.			Overall
Team	W		L	W		L
Mountain Division
Boise State xy	8	–	0	10	–	4
Air Force	5	–	3	10	–	3
Wyoming	5	–	3	7	–	6
Utah State	5	–	3	6	–	7
Colorado State	3	–	5	3	–	9
New Mexico	0	–	8	2	–	10
West Division
No. 24 Fresno State xy$	7	–	1	10	–	4
San Diego State	5	–	3	7	–	6
San Jose State	5	–	3	7	–	5
UNLV	3	–	5	5	–	7
Hawaii	2	–	6	3	–	10
Nevada	0	–	8	2	–	10
Championship: Fresno State 28, Boise State 16
$ – Conference champion; x – Division champion/co-champions; y – Championship game participant; Rankings from AP Poll

The 2022 Hawaii Rainbow Warriors football team represented the University of Hawaiʻi at Mānoa in the 2022 NCAA Division I FBS football season. Led by first-year head coach Timmy Chang, the Rainbow Warriors played their home games at the Clarence T. C. Ching Athletics Complex as members of the West Division of the Mountain West Conference.

== Schedule ==
The home opener against Vanderbilt was the first sold-out home game since 2007, when the Rainbow Warriors played in front of two consecutive sellouts against Boise State and Washington. Hawai'i's subsequent home game against Western Kentucky was also sold out, marking the first time since 2007 that consecutive sellouts were recorded.

Date	Time	Opponent	Site	TV	Result	Attendance
August 27	4:30 p.m.	Vanderbilt*	Clarence T. C. Ching Athletics Complex; Honolulu, HI	CBSSN	L 10–63	9,346
September 3	6:00 p.m.	Western Kentucky*	Clarence T. C. Ching Athletics Complex; Honolulu, HI	SPEC PPV	L 17–49	9,346
September 10	2:00 p.m.	at No. 4 Michigan*	Michigan Stadium; Ann Arbor, MI	BTN	L 10–56	110,012
September 17	6:00 p.m.	Duquesne*^{†}	Clarence T. C. Ching Athletics Complex; Honolulu, HI	SPEC PPV	W 24–14	8,991
September 24	2:00 p.m.	at New Mexico State*	Aggie Memorial Stadium; Las Cruces, NM	FloSports	L 26–45	12,897
October 8	4:30 p.m.	at San Diego State	Snapdragon Stadium; San Diego, CA	CBSSN	L 14–16	33,073
October 15	6:00 p.m.	Nevada	Clarence T. C. Ching Athletics Complex; Honolulu, HI	SPEC PPV	W 31–16	9,231
October 22	10:00 a.m.	at Colorado State	Canvas Stadium; Fort Collins, CO	SPEC PPV	L 13–17	22,843
October 29	6:00 p.m.	Wyoming	Clarence T. C. Ching Athletics Complex; Honolulu, HI (rivalry)	SPEC PPV	L 20–27	9,346
November 5	4:30 p.m.	at Fresno State	Bulldog Stadium; Fresno, CA (rivalry)	FS2	L 13–55	39,005
November 12	6:00 p.m.	Utah State	Clarence T. C. Ching Athletics Complex; Honolulu, HI	SPEC PPV	L 34–41	8,862
November 19	6:00 p.m.	UNLV	Clarence T. C. Ching Athletics Complex; Honolulu, HI	SPEC PPV	W 31–25	9,346
November 26	10:30 a.m.	at San Jose State	CEFCU Stadium; San Jose, CA (Dick Tomey Legacy Game)	SPEC PPV	L 14–27	15,012
*Non-conference game; ^{†}Homecoming; Rankings from AP Poll; All times are in Hawaii time

== Roster ==
2022 Hawaii Rainbow Warriors football team roster
Players
Coaches
Offense

Pos.	#	Name	Class
WR	1	Jonah Panoke	Jr
WR	2	Chad Owens Jr. (injured)	Fr
RB	3	James Phillips	Sr
WR	4	Jalen Walthall	Fr
QB	5	Jake Farrell	So
WR	6	Zion Bowens	Sr
TE	7	Jordan Murray	Sr
WR	8	Tamatoa Mokiao-Atimalala	Jr
WR	9	Dior Scott	Sr
RB	11	Jordan Johnson	Fr
QB	12	Cammon Cooper	Jr
QB	13	Brayden Schager	So
QB	16	Armani Edden	Sr
TE	17	Greyson Morgan	So
QB	18	Joey Yellen	Jr
WR	19	Nicholas Cenacle	Fr
RB	20	Keith Moton III	Fr
RB	21	David Cordero	So
RB	22	Nasjzaé Bryant-Lelei	So
WR	23	Isaiah Shizuru	Fr
RB	24	Tylan Hines	Fr
RB	26	Derek Boyd II	Fr
WR	27	Koali Nishigaya	So
TE	30	Landon Sims	Fr
RB	31	Dedrick Parson (C)	Sr
RB	33	Brock Hedani	So
RB	38	Robbie Paikai	Fr
RB	43	Ronson Young	Sr
OL	51	Maurice Taʻala	So
OL	52	Solo Vaipulu	Sr
OL	54	Ethan Spencer	Fr
OL	58	Zhen Sotelo	Fr
OL	61	Eliki Tanuvasa (C)	Sr
OL	64	Kauka Umiamaka	Jr
OL	66	Sergio Muasau	So
OL	68	Ra Elkington	Sr
OL	69	Stephan Bernal-Wendt	Sr
OL	70	Arasi Mose	Jr
OL	71	Micah Vanterpool	Sr
OL	72	Luke Felix-Fualalo	Jr
OL	73	Nate Adams	Fr
OL	74	Micah Mariteragi	Sr
OL	75	Ilm Manning	Sr
OL	77	Austin Hopp	Sr
OL	78	Kaʻena Decambra	Fr
OL	79	Micah Soliai Howlett	So
TE	80	Kamuela Borden	Sr
WR	81	Grey Ihu	Sr
WR	82	Alex Perry	Fr
WR	83	Karsyn Pupunu	So
WR	84	Chuuky Hines	Fr
TE	85	Caleb Phillips	Sr
WR	86	Pofele Ashlock	Fr
TE	87	Devon Tauaefa	Fr
WR	88	Steven Fiso	Sr

Defense

Pos.	#	Name	Class
LB	1	Penei Pavihi (C)	Sr
DB	3	Hugh Nelson II	Sr
DB	4	Ty Marsh	So
DB	5	McKenzie Barnes (injured)	Jr
LB	6	Riley Wilson	So
DL	7	Mataio Soli	Sr
DB	8	Jojo Forest	Jr
DB	9	Malik Hausman	Sr
DL	10	Kolby Wyatt	Sr
DB	11	Nalu Emerson	Jr
DL	12	Wynden Hoʻohuli	Fr
LB	13	Jalen Smith	So
DB	14	Von Killins	Jr
LB	16	Logan Taylor	Sr
LB	17	Isaiah Tufaga	Sr
LB	18	Noah Kema	Jr
DB	19	Kaulana Makaula	Jr
DB	20	Cam Bell	Jr
DB	21	Tiger Peterson	Jr
DB	22	Jalen Perdue	Sr
DB	23	Virdel Edwards II	Jr
DB	24	Devyn King	Jr
DB	25	Matagi Thompson	Fr
DB	26	Leonard Lee	Sr
LB	27	Diego Betancourt	Fr
DB	28	Meki Pei	So
LB	29	Kruze Keanu	Fr
DB	30	Kona Moore	Fr
DB	31	Billy Mitchell III	Sr
DB	33	Peter Manuma	Fr
DL	34	Dean Briski	Fr
DB	35	Isaiah Malloe	Fr
DB	37	Noah Cambra	Sr
LB	38	Kamalu DeBlake	Fr
DB	39	Kalamaku Kuewa	Sr
LB	40	D.J. Utu	Fr
LB	42	Jonah Kahahawai-Welch	Sr
DL	43	Tariq Jones	Fr
LB	44	Sonny Semeatu	Fr
LB	45	Steele Dubar	Jr
DB	46	Kai Preusser	Fr
LB	47	Noa Kamana	Sr
DL	48	Malachi Finau	Fr
LB	51	George Hooker	Sr
DL	52	Ezra Evaimalo	So
DL	53	Etuate Moala	Jr
DL	55	Blessman Taʻala (C)	Sr
DL	56	Andrew Faoliu	Sr
LB	59	Demarii Blanks	Jr
DL	68	Jojo Falo	Sr
DL	90	John Tuitupou	Sr
DL	95	Anthony Sagapolutele	So
DL	96	Andrew Choi	Sr
DL	97	Zach Ritner	Sr
DL	98	Foʻi Shaw	Sr
DL	99	Tali Moe	Fr

Special teams

Pos.	#	Name	Class
PK, P	2	Matthew Shipley	Jr
LS	44	Solomon Landrum	Jr
PK, P	46	Kyler Halvorsen	So
LS	60	Scotty Atkinson	Jr
PK, P	86	Ben Falck	Jr

Head coach

- Timmy Chang (Hawaiʻi)

Coordinators/assistant coaches

- Thomas Sheffield (Sam Houston State)
  Associate head coach / special teams coordinator / tight ends
- Ian Shoemaker (Grinnell)
  Offensive coordinator / quarterbacks
- Jacob Yoro (Hawaiʻi)
  Defensive coordinator / outside linebackers
- Chris Brown (Hawaiʻi)
  Inside linebackers
- Josh Brown (San José State)
  Safeties
- Abe Elimimian (Hawaiʻi)
  Cornerbacks
- Eti Ena (Eastern Washington)
  Defensive line
- Keiki Misipeka (Hawaiʻi)
  Running backs
- Jared Ursua (Southern Utah)
  Wide receivers
- Roman Sapolu (Oregon State)
  Offensive line

Support staff

- Kody Cooke (Tulsa)
  Strength and conditioning coach
- Matt Chon (La Verne)
  Chief of staff/director of operations
- Nate Ilaoa (Hawaiʻi)
  Director of recruiting
- Silas Clapham (Florida State)
  Director of player personnel
- Jeff Reinebold (Indiana University South Bend)
  Director of player development
- Colin Shaffer (Arizona State)
  Video coordinator
- Jimbo Davis (Nevada)
  Quality control
- Jordan Puʻu-Robinson (Hawaiʻi)
  Quality control
- Cade Socha (Keiser)
  Quality control
- Alema Kapoi (Hawaiʻi)
  Graduate assistant
- Winterhawk Leighton (Central Washington)
  Graduate assistant
- Jeremiah McCullough (Kansas)
  Graduate assistant
- PJ Minaya (Pacific)
  Graduate assistant

Legend

- (C) Team captain
- (S) Suspended
- (I) Ineligible
- Injured
- Redshirt

Roster
Last update: August 23, 2022

== Game summaries ==
=== Vanderbilt ===
	1	2	3	4	Total
Commodores	14	7	35	7	63
Rainbow Warriors	7	3	0	0	10

Statistics

Statistics	VAN	HAW
First downs	28	20
Total yards	601	358
Rushing yards	404	108
Passing yards	197	250
Turnovers	0	2
Time of possession	31:03	28:57

Team	Category	Player	Statistics
Vanderbilt	Passing	Mike Wright	13/21, 146 yards, 2 TD
Vanderbilt	Rushing	Mike Wright	13 rushes, 163 yards, 2 TD
Vanderbilt	Receiving	Will Sheppard	3 receptions, 39 yards, 2 TD
Hawaii	Passing	Brayden Schager	18/35, 161 yards
Hawaii	Rushing	Dedrick Parson	13 rushes, 82 yards, TD
Hawaii	Receiving	Jonah Panoke	7 receptions, 101 yards

=== Western Kentucky ===
Western Kentucky Hilltoppers (1–0) at Hawaii Rainbow Warriors (0–1)

Quarter	1	2	3	4	Total
Hilltoppers	0	21	7	21	49
Rainbow Warriors	3	7	0	7	17

at Clarence T. C. Ching Athletics Complex, Honolulu, HI

- Date: September 3, 2022
- Game time: 6:00 p.m. HT
- Game attendance: 9,346
- Referee: Christian Watson
- TV announcers (Spectrum PPV): Kanoa Leahey (play-by-play), Rich Miano (analyst), Scott Robbs (sideline)

Game information

First quarter
Second quarter
Third quarter
Fourth quarter

Top passers

- WKU – Austin Reed – 22/31, 271 yards, 3 TD, INT
- HAW – Brayden Schager – 22/33, 230 yards, 4 INT

Top rushers

- WKU – Kye Robichaux – 7 carries, 49 yards, TD
- HAW – Nasjzae Bryant-Lelei – 13 carries, 64 yards, TD

Top receivers

- WKU – Daewood Davis – 5 receptions, 78 yards
- HAW – Jalen Walthall – 3 receptions, 53 yards

=== At No. 4 Michigan ===
Hawaii Rainbow Warriors (0–2) at No. 4 Michigan Wolverines (1–0)

Quarter	1	2	3	4	Total
Rainbow Warriors	0	0	3	7	10
No. 4 Wolverines	21	21	0	14	56

at Michigan Stadium, Ann Arbor, MI

- Date: September 10, 2022
- Game time: 2:00 p.m. HT
- Game weather: Rain • Temperature: 73 °F (23 °C) • Wind: SE 7 miles per hour (11 km/h)
- Game attendance: 110,012
- Referee: Larry Smith
- TV announcers (BTN): Lisa Byington (play-by-play), Jake Butt (analyst), Meghan McKeown (sideline)

Game information

First quarter
Second quarter
Third quarter
Fourth quarter

Top passers

- HAW – Joey Yellen – 13/36, 113 yards
- MICH – J. J. McCarthy – 11/12, 229 yards, 3 TD

Top rushers

- HAW – Tylan Hines – 8 carries, 75 yards, TD
- MICH – Blake Corum – 9 carries, 88 yards, TD

Top receivers

- HAW – James Phillips – 3 receptions, 33 yards
- MICH – Ronnie Bell – 6 receptions, 76 yards, TD

=== Duquesne ===
Duquesne Dukes (1–2) at Hawaii Rainbow Warriors (0–3)

Quarter	1	2	3	4	Total
Dukes	3	3	0	8	14
Rainbow Warriors	7	7	0	10	24

at Clarence T. C. Ching Athletics Complex, Honolulu, HI

- Date: September 17, 2022
- Game time: 6:00 p.m. HT
- Game attendance: 8,991
- Referee: Cal McNeill
- TV announcers (Spectrum PPV): Kanoa Leahey (play-by-play), Rich Miano (analyst), Scott Robbs (sideline)

=== At New Mexico State ===
Hawaii Rainbow Warriors (1–3) at New Mexico State Aggies (0–4)

Quarter	1	2	3	4	Total
Rainbow Warriors	7	3	7	9	26
Aggies	14	21	7	3	45

at Aggie Memorial Stadium, Las Cruces, NM

- Date: September 24, 2022
- Game time: 2:00 p.m.
- Game weather: Sunny • Temperature: 89 °F (32 °C) • Wind: SE 3 miles per hour (4.8 km/h)
- Game attendance: 12,879
- Referee: Steve Baron
- TV announcers (FloSports): Adam Young, Danny Knee, Andy Morgan

=== At San Diego State ===
Hawaii Rainbow Warriors (1–4) at San Diego State Aztecs (2–3)

Quarter	1	2	3	4	Total
Rainbow Warriors	0	0	7	7	14
Aztecs	0	3	7	6	16

at Snapdragon Stadium, San Diego, CA

- Date: October 8, 2022
- Game time: 4:30 p.m. HT
- Game attendance: 33,073
- TV announcers (CBSSN): Rich Waltz (play-by-play), Aaron Taylor (analyst), Amanda Guerra (sideline)

=== Nevada ===
Nevada Wolf Pack (2–4) at Hawaii Rainbow Warriors (1–5)

Quarter	1	2	3	4	Total
Wolf Pack	7	6	3	0	16
Rainbow Warriors	14	7	0	10	31

at Clarence T. C. Ching Athletics Complex, Honolulu, HI

- Date: October 15, 2022
- Game time: 6:00 p.m. HT
- Game attendance: 9,231
- TV announcers (Spectrum PPV): Kanoa Leahey (play-by-play), Rich Miano (analyst), Scott Robbs (sideline)

=== At Colorado State ===
Hawaii Rainbow Warriors (2–5) at Colorado State Rams (1–5)

Quarter	1	2	3	4	Total
Rainbow Warriors	3	10	0	0	13
Rams	0	3	7	7	17

at Canvas Stadium, Fort Collins, CO

- Date: October 22, 2022
- Game time: 10:00 a.m. HT
- Game attendance: 22,843
- Referee: Jonathan Noli
- TV announcers (Spectrum PPV): Kanoa Leahey (play-by-play), Rich Miano (analyst)

Game information

First quarter
Second quarter
Third quarter
Fourth quarter

Top passers

- HAW – Brayden Schager – 18/30, 173 yards, TD, INT
- CSU – Clay Millen – 17/24, 177 yards

Top rushers

- HAW – Dedrick Parson – 15 carries, 71 yards
- CSU – Avery Morrow – 26 carries, 147 yards, 2 TD

Top receivers

- HAW – Zion Bowens – 2 receptions, 38 yards
- CSU – Justus Ross-Simmons – 4 receptions, 64 yards

=== Wyoming ===
Wyoming Cowboys at Hawaii Rainbow Warriors

Quarter	1	2	3	4	Total
Cowboys	0	10	3	14	27
Rainbow Warriors	7	3	3	7	20

at Clarence T. C. Ching Athletics Complex, Honolulu, HI

- Date: October 29, 2022
- Game time: 6:00 p.m. HT
- Game attendance: 9,346
- Referee: Timothy Davis
- TV announcers (Spectrum PPV): Kanoa Leahey (play-by-play), Rich Miano (analyst), Scott Robbs (sideline)

=== At Fresno State ===
Hawaii Rainbow Warriors at Fresno State Bulldogs

Quarter	1	2	3	4	Total
Rainbow Warriors	0	0	0	13	13
Bulldogs	17	14	10	14	55

at Bulldog Stadium, Fresno, CA

- Date: November 5, 2022
- Game time: 4:30 p.m. HT
- Game weather: Partly Cloudy • Temperature: 65 °F (18 °C) • Wind:
- Game attendance: 39,005
- Referee: Christian Watson
- TV announcers (FS2): Guy Haberman (play-by-play), & Will Blackmon (analyst)

Game information

First quarter

- (6:54) FRES – Abraham Montano 31-yard field goal (Drive: 10 plays, 56 yards, 3:52; Fresno State 3–0)
- (4:55) FRES – Cam Lockridge 31-yard interception return, Abraham Montano kick (Fresno State 10–0)
- (1:59) FRES – Jordan Mims 22-yard run, Abraham Montano kick (Drive: 6 plays, 81 yards, 2:14; Fresno State 17–0)

Second quarter

- (7:16) FRES – Jalen Cropper 7-yard pass from Jake Haener, Dylan Lynch kick (Drive: 14 plays, 71 yards, 5:42; Fresno State 24–0)
- (0:41) FRES – Erik Brooks 16-yard pass from Jake Haener, Dylan Lynch kick (Drive: 10 plays, 64 yards, 4:27; Fresno State 31–0)

Third quarter

- (9:12) FRES – Dylan Lynch 25-yard field goal (Drive: 11 plays, 68 yards, 5:48; Fresno State 34–0)
- (6:22) FRES – Jalen Cropper 59-yard pass from Jake Haener, Dylan Lynch kick (Drive: 2 plays, 71 yards, 0:27; Fresno State 41–0)

Fourth quarter

- (14:18) FRES – Nikko Remigio 11-yard pass from Jake Haener, Dylan Lynch kick (Drive: 7 plays, 78 yards, 3:51; Fresno State 48–0)
- (9:33) FRES – Elijah Gilliam 7-yard run, Dylan Lynch kick (Drive: 6 plays, 76 yards, 3:31; Fresno State 55–0)
- (3:46) HAW – Nasjzae Bryant-Lelei 1-yard run, Matthew Shipley kick (Drive: 13 plays, 75 yards, 5:47; Fresno State 55–7)
- (0:35) HAW – Tamatoa Mokiao-Atimalala 4-yard pass from Brayden Schager, kick blocked (Drive: 6 plays, 59 yards, 1:30; Fresno State 55–13)

Statistics	HAW	FRES
First downs	21	27
Plays–yards	73–367	68–572
Rushes–yards	34–158	39–245
Passing yards	204	327
Passing: comp–att–int	20–40–1	24–29–0
Turnovers		
Time of possession	27:44	32:16

Team	Category	Player	Statistics
Hawaii	Passing	Brayden Schager	20/40, 204 yards, TD, INT
Hawaii	Rushing	Tylan Hines	11 carries, 79 yards
Hawaii	Receiving	Tylan Hines	4 receptions, 48 yards
Fresno State	Passing	Jake Haener	24/29, 327 yards, 4 TD
Fresno State	Rushing	Jordan Mims	18 carries, 123 yards, TD
Fresno State	Receiving	Jalen Cropper	5 receptions, 93 yards, 2 TD

=== Utah State ===
Utah State Aggies at Hawaii Rainbow Warriors

Quarter	1	2	3	4	Total
Aggies	10	14	10	7	41
Rainbow Warriors	0	10	7	17	34

at Clarence T. C. Ching Athletics Complex, Honolulu, HI

- Date: November 12, 2022
- Game time: 6:00 p.m. HT
- Game attendance: 8,862
- TV announcers (Spectrum PPV): Kanoa Leahey (play-by-play), Rich Miano (analyst), Scott Robbs (sideline)

=== UNLV ===
UNLV Rebels at Hawaii Rainbow Warriors

Quarter	1	2	3	4	Total
Rebels	6	7	3	9	25
Rainbow Warriors	7	0	14	10	31

at Clarence T. C. Ching Athletics Complex, Honolulu, HI

- Date: November 19, 2022
- Game time: 6:00 p.m. HT
- Game attendance: 9,346
- TV announcers (Spectrum PPV): Kanoa Leahey (play-by-play), Rich Miano (analyst), Scott Robbs (sideline)

=== At San Jose State ===
Hawaii Rainbow Warriors at San Jose State Spartans

Quarter	1	2	3	4	Total
Rainbow Warriors	0	6	0	8	14
Spartans	7	7	7	6	27

at CEFCU Stadium, San Jose, CA

- Date: November 26, 2022
- Game time: 10:30 a.m. HT
- Game attendance: 15,012
- TV announcers (Spectrum PPV): Kanoa Leahey (play-by-play), Rich Miano (analyst)
