= 2020 Hawaii Rainbow Warriors football team =

American college football season

2020 Hawaii Rainbow Warriors football

New Mexico Bowl champion

New Mexico Bowl, W 28–14 vs. Houston
- Conference: Mountain West Conference
- Record: 5–4 (4–4 MW)
- Head coach: Todd Graham (1st season)
- Offensive coordinator: G. J. Kinne (1st season)
- Co-offensive coordinator: Tony Hull (1st season)
- Offensive scheme: Run and gun
- Defensive coordinator: Victor Santa Cruz (1st season)
- Co-defensive coordinator: Jacob Yoro (1st season)
- Base defense: Double eagle flex (Desert Swarm)
- Captains: Miles Reed; Khoury Bethley; Eugene Ford; Chevan Cordeiro
- Home stadium: Aloha Stadium

2020 Mountain West Conference football standings
| | Conf. | | | Overall |
| Team | W | | L | W | | L |
|---|---|---|---|---|---|---|
| No. 24 San Jose State y$ | 6 | – | 0 | 7 | – | 1 |
| Boise State y | 5 | – | 0 | 5 | – | 2 |
| Nevada | 6 | – | 2 | 7 | – | 2 |
| San Diego State | 4 | – | 2 | 4 | – | 4 |
| Hawaii | 4 | – | 4 | 5 | – | 4 |
| Fresno State | 3 | – | 3 | 3 | – | 3 |
| Air Force | 2 | – | 2 | 3 | – | 3 |
| Wyoming | 2 | – | 4 | 2 | – | 4 |
| New Mexico | 2 | – | 5 | 2 | – | 5 |
| Colorado State | 1 | – | 3 | 1 | – | 3 |
| Utah State | 1 | – | 5 | 1 | – | 5 |
| UNLV | 0 | – | 6 | 0 | – | 6 |
Championship: San Jose State 34, Boise State 20
$ – Conference champion; y – Championship game participant; Note: Due to COVID-19, the Mountain West suspended the season, but later decided to begin play on October 24.; Rankings from AP Poll

The 2020 Hawaii Rainbow Warriors football team represented the University of Hawaiʻi at Mānoa in the 2020 NCAA Division I FBS football season. The Rainbow Warriors played their final home games at Aloha Stadium in Honolulu as members of the Mountain West Conference. They were led by first-year head coach Todd Graham.

On August 10, 2020, the Mountain West Conference suspended all fall sports competitions due to the COVID-19 pandemic. This decision was later reversed on September 24, with all 12 teams playing an eight-game, conference-only schedule starting on October 24.

The Rainbow Warriors ended their season with a winning record for the third year in a row, also claiming the New Mexico Bowl over Houston. Graham also became the first Hawaii coach since Bob Wagner in 1987 to win his debut; the last five had lost their debuts, all by 20 points or more.

== Preseason ==
=== Award watch lists ===
Listed in the order that they were released

| Award | Player | Position | Year |
|---|---|---|---|
| Doak Walker Award | Miles Reed | RB | JR |
| Fred Biletnikoff Award | Jared Smart | WR | SR |
| Outland Trophy | Ilm Manning | OL | JR |
| Rimington Trophy | Taaga Tuulima | C | SR |
| Wuerffel Trophy | Hekili Keliliki | RB | JR |
| Burlsworth Trophy | Taaga Tuulima | C | SR |

=== Mountain West media days ===
The Mountain West media days was initially set to be virtually held on the days of July 27–29, but were later postponed by the conference.

==== Media poll ====
The preseason poll was released on July 21, 2020. Hawaii was initially picked to finish third in the West Division. The divisions were later suspended for the 2020 season.

West
| Predicted finish | Team | Votes (1st place) |
|---|---|---|
| 1 | San Diego State | 122 (19) |
| 2 | Nevada | 100 (2) |
| 3 | Hawaii | 74 |
| 4 | Fresno State | 73 |
| 5 | San Jose State | 43 |
| 6 | UNLV | 29 |

Mountain
| Predicted finish | Team | Votes (1st place) |
|---|---|---|
| 1 | Boise State | 125 (20) |
| 2 | Wyoming | 90 (1) |
| 3 | Air Force | 86 |
| 4 | Utah State | 60 |
| 5 | Colorado State | 59 |
| 6 | New Mexico | 21 |

==== Preseason All-Mountain West Team ====
The Rainbow Warriors only had one player selected to the preseason All–Mountain West Team.

Offense
Ilm Manning – OL

== Schedule ==
Hawaii had its first four games against Arizona, UCLA, Fordham and Oregon canceled before the start of the 2020 season. Each cancellation, related to the COVID-19 pandemic, was due to individual conferences attempting to reduce spread of the virus through travel restrictions. Robert Morris later replaced Fordham on the schedule, announced on July 13, 2020.

The entire season was suspended by the Mountain West Conference on August 10, 2020, in response to the COVID-19 pandemic. However, the decision was reversed on September 24, with the conference announcing each team would play an eight-game, conference-only schedule. The new schedule was released by the Mountain West on October 1, 2020. Hawaii played seven of their original conference opponents, with the only change being Wyoming replacing Air Force on the schedule. Hawaii Athletics also announced that home games would be held without fans, in accordance with government regulations.

The game scheduled for December 5 with San Jose State was moved to Aloha Stadium after new COVID-19 restrictions were released in Santa Clara County, where CEFCU Stadium is located. Hawaii played as the designated road team in their new all-white road uniforms, which debuted against Fresno State.

| Date | Time | Opponent | Site | TV | Result | Attendance |
|---|---|---|---|---|---|---|
| October 24 | 1:30 p.m. | at Fresno State | Bulldog Stadium; Fresno, CA (rivalry) | SPEC HI | W 34–19 | 0 |
| October 30 | 3:45 p.m. | at Wyoming | War Memorial Stadium; Laramie, WY (Paniolo Trophy Game) | FS1 | L 7–31 | 6,232 |
| November 7 | 6:00 p.m. | New Mexico | Aloha Stadium; Honolulu, HI | SPEC HI | W 39–33 | 0 |
| November 14 | 11:00 a.m. | at San Diego State | Dignity Health Sports Park; Carson, CA | SPEC HI | L 10–34 | 0 |
| November 21 | 6:00 p.m. | Boise State | Aloha Stadium; Honolulu, HI | CBSSN | L 32–40 | 0 |
| November 28 | 6:00 p.m. | Nevada | Aloha Stadium; Honolulu, HI | SPEC HI | W 24–21 | 0 |
| December 5 | 1:00 p.m. | San Jose State | Aloha Stadium; Honolulu, HI (Dick Tomey Legacy Game) | SPEC HI | L 24–35 | 0 |
| December 12 | 6:00 p.m. | UNLV | Aloha Stadium; Honolulu, HI (Island Showdown Game) | SPEC HI | W 38–21 | 0 |
| December 24 | 10:30 a.m. | vs. Houston* | Toyota Stadium; Frisco, TX (New Mexico Bowl) | ESPN | W 28–14 | 2,060 |
*Non-conference game; All times are in Hawaii time

== Roster ==
2020 Hawaii Rainbow Warriors football team roster
Players
Coaches
Offense

| Pos. | # | Name | Class |
|---|---|---|---|
| RB | 0 | Dae Dae Hunter | Fr |
| WR | 3 | Melquise Stovall | Sr |
| RB | 4 | Miles Reed (C) | Jr |
| WR | 6 | Zion Bowens | Jr |
| RB | 7 | Calvin Turner | Sr |
| WR | 8 | Rico Bussey | Sr |
| WR | 9 | Jonah Panoke | Fr |
| WR | 10 | Quin Bright | Fr |
| QB | 11 | Justin Uahinui | Jr |
| QB | 12 | Chevan Cordeiro (C) | So |
| QB | 13 | Jake Farrell | Fr |
| WR | 14 | James Phillips | So |
| QB | 16 | Armani Edden | Jr |
| QB | 18 | Boone Abbott | Fr |
| QB | 19 | Kamaliʻi Akina | Sr |
| WR | 23 | Jared Smart | Sr |
| RB | 27 | Koali Nishigaya | Fr |
| WR | 28 | Aaron Cephus | Sr |
| WR | 31 | Jaden Allen | Fr |
| RB | 35 | Hekili Keliiliki | Jr |
| RB | 36 | Kenneth Fitzgerald | Jr |
| RB | 38 | Keliam Brunn | So |
| OL | 40 | Sergio Muasau | Fr |
| OL | 52 | Solo Vaipulu | Jr |
| OL | 53 | Ramsey Aviu | Jr |
| OL | 58 | Joey Nuʻuanu-Kuhiʻiki | Sr |
| OL | 61 | Eliki Tanuvasa | So |
| OL | 63 | Taaga Tuulima | Sr |
| OL | 64 | Kauka Umiamaka | Fr |
| OL | 65 | Elias Wong | Jr |
| OL | 68 | Ra Elkington | Jr |
| OL | 70 | Arasi Mose | Fr |
| OL | 71 | Micah Vanterpool | Jr |
| OL | 72 | Kohl Levao (injured) | Sr |
| OL | 74 | Gene Pryor | Sr |
| OL | 75 | Ilm Manning | Jr |
| OL | 76 | Michael Eletise | Sr |
| OL | 77 | Alesania Sunia | Sr |
| OL | 78 | Ernest Moore | Sr |
| OL | 79 | Micah Soliai Howlett | Fr |
| WR | 80 | Mekel Ealy | Fr |
| WR | 81 | Grey Ihu | Jr |
| WR | 82 | Dayton Toney | Fr |
| WR | 83 | Kahale Huddleston | So |
| WR | 84 | Nick Mardner | So |
| WR | 85 | Lincoln Victor | So |
| WR | 86 | Riley Wilson | Fr |
| WR | 87 | Kaleb Maresh | So |
| WR | 87 | Dior Scott | Jr |
| WR | 88 | Tamatoa Mokiao-Atimalala | Fr |
| OL | 89 | Caden Hilborn | Fr |
| WR | 89 | Kilohana Haasenritter (Opt-out) | Fr |

Defense

| Pos. | # | Name | Class |
|---|---|---|---|
| LB | 1 | Penei Pavihi | Jr |
| LB | 2 | Jeremiah Pritchard | Sr |
| DB | 5 | Khoury Bethley (C) | Jr |
| DB | 8 | Eugene Ford (injured) (C) | Sr |
| DL | 10 | Mark Blocker II | Fr |
| DB | 11 | Sterlin Ortiz | Jr |
| DB | 13 | Jalen Perdue | Jr |
| LB | 15 | Paul Scott | Jr |
| DB | 16 | Logan Taylor | Jr |
| LB | 17 | Isaiah Tufaga | So |
| DB | 18 | Cortez Davis | Sr |
| DB | 19 | Quentin Frazier | Sr |
| DB | 20 | Cameron Lockridge | So |
| DB | 21 | Michael Washington | Fr |
| DB | 24 | Kai Kaneshiro | So |
| DB | 25 | Travon Killins | Fr |
| DB | 26 | Leonard Lee | Jr |
| DB | 28 | Nalu Emerson | Fr |
| DB | 29 | Donovan Dalton | Jr |
| DL | 30 | Kamuela Borden | So |
| DB | 31 | Tiger Peterson | Fr |
| DB | 33 | Steven Fiso | So |
| DB | 34 | James Green III | So |
| DB | 37 | Alakaʻi Mashima | Jr |
| DB | 39 | Kalamaku Kuewa | So |
| DL | 42 | Jonah Kahahawai-Welch | So |
| DL | 43 | Mason Vega | Sr |
| LB | 45 | Payton Awaya | Sr |
| LB | 46 | Tauivi Ho Ching | Sr |
| DB | 47 | Noa Kamana | Jr |
| DL | 48 | Derek Thomas | Sr |
| DB | 49 | Asher Pilanca | Fr |
| DL | 50 | Justus Tavai | Jr |
| DL | 51 | Makai Manuwai | Sr |
| DL | 52 | Ezra Evaimalo | Fr |
| LB | 53 | Darius Muasau | So |
| DL | 54 | Kalani Kamakawiwoʻole | Fr |
| DL | 55 | Blessman Taʻala | Jr |
| DL | 57 | Samson Siilata | Fr |
| LB | 58 | Kila Kamakawiwoʻole | Fr |
| DL | 59 | Andrew Choi | So |
| DL | 71 | Stephan Bernal-Wendt | Jr |
| DL | 73 | Johnny Morrison | Jr |
| DL | 90 | John Tuitupou | Sr |
| DL | 91 | Gabriel Iniguez Jr. | Fr |
| DL | 92 | DJuan Matthews | Sr |
| DL | 93 | Mason Mataafa | Jr |
| DL | 94 | Alema Kapoi | Jr |
| DL | 95 | Doug Russell | Jr |
| DL | 95 | Kemon Smith | Jr |
| DL | 96 | Maurice Taʻala | Fr |
| LB | 97 | Zach Ritner | So |
| DL | 98 | Foi Shaw | So |
| DL | 99 | Jonah Laulu | So |

Special teams

| Pos. | # | Name | Class |
|---|---|---|---|
| PK | 1 | Matthew Shipley | Fr |
| P | 12 | Stan Gaudion | Sr |
| PK | 30 | Kaʻeo Rezentes | Fr |
| LS | 44 | Wyatt Tucker | Jr |
| PK, P | 69 | Ben Falck | So |
| PK, P | 96 | Adam Stack | Jr |

Head coach

- Todd Graham (East Central)

Coordinators/assistant coaches

- Victor Santa Cruz (Hawaiʻi)
  Associate head coach/defensive coordinator/outside linebackers
- G. J. Kinne (Tulsa)
  Offensive coordinator/quarterbacks
- Danny Phillips (Central Oklahoma)
  Special Teams coordinator/defensive line
- Tony Hull (Louisiana)
  Co-offensive coordinator/Inside Receivers
- Jacob Yoro (Hawaiʻi)
  Co-defensive coordinator/linebackers
- Bo Graham (Tulsa)
  Pass Game coordinator/running backs
- Sam Bennett (Texas Tech)
  Run Game coordinator/offensive line
- Abe Elimimian (Hawaiʻi)
  Cornerbacks/recruiting coordinator
- Brennan Marion (Tulsa)
  Wide receivers
- Laiu Moeakiola (Arizona State)
  Safeties

Support staff

- Kody Cooke (Tulsa)
  Strength and Conditioning Coach/assistant head coach
- Trent Figg (William Jewell)
  Chief of Staff
- Matt Passwaters (New Mexico State)
  Graduate assistant (offensive line)
- PJ Minaya (Pacific)
  Graduate assistant (quarterbacks)
- Koa Kaai (Oregon)
  Graduate assistant (defensive line)
- Tyler Clifton (Hendrix)
  Graduate assistant (Defense/special teams)
- Ryan Matviko (Mercyhurst)
  Offensive quality control
- Landon Keopple (Tulsa)
  Offensive quality control
- Kim McCloud (Hawaiʻi)
  Defensive quality control
- Colin Shaffer
  Video Coordinator
- Josh Omura
  Director of On-Campus Recruiting
- Chandler Enegren
  Recruiting & Operations Assistant
- Myles Gota
  Volunteer Administrative Assistant
- Al Ginoza
  Head Equipment Manager
- Brandon Devie
  Football Equipment Manager
- Brian Wong
  Football Athletic Trainer
- Courtney Tsumoto
  Academic Advisor
- Derek Inouchi
  Media Relations Director/Football Contact
- Neal Iwamoto
  Asst. Media Relations Director/Football Contact

Legend

- (C) Team captain
- (S) Suspended
- (I) Ineligible
- Injured
- Redshirt

Roster
Last update: November 17, 2020

=== Depth chart ===
| † | Final Depth Chart |

Defense

DB
Quentin Frazier
Jalen Perdue

FS
Kai Kaneshiro
Donovan Dalton

| WEAK | BASE | STRONG |
|---|---|---|
| Jeremiah Pritchard | Darius Muasau | Khoury Bethley |
| Isaiah Tufaga | Penei Pavihi | Logan Taylor |

SS
Cameron Lockridge
Sterlin Ortiz

CB
Cortez Davis
James Green III

| DE | NT | DE |
|---|---|---|
| Justus Tavai | Blessman Taʻala | Jonah Laulu |
| Derek Thomas | John Tuitupou | DJuan Matthews |

CB
Michael Washington
Cameron Lockridge

Offense

X
Jonah Panoke
Rico Bussey

H
Calvin Turner
Koali Nishigaya

| LT | LG | C | RG | RT |
|---|---|---|---|---|
| Micah Vanterpool | Michael Eletise | Taaga Tuulima | Solo Vaipulu | Gene Pryor |
| Ilm Manning | Sergio Muasau | Eliki Tanuvasa | Micah Soliai Howlett | Ilm Manning |

SL
Jared Smart
Dior Scott

Z
Melquise Stovall
Nick Mardner

QB
Chevan Cordeiro
Boone Abbott

RB
Dae Dae Hunter
Calvin Turner

Special teams
PK Matthew Shipley
P Adam Stack
KR Calvin Turner
PR Calvin Turner
LS Wyatt Tucker
H Stan Gaudion

== Game summaries ==
=== At Fresno State ===
Hawaii Rainbow Warriors at Fresno State Bulldogs

| Quarter | 1 | 2 | 3 | 4 | Total |
|---|---|---|---|---|---|
| Rainbow Warriors | 7 | 10 | 7 | 10 | 34 |
| Bulldogs | 7 | 6 | 3 | 3 | 19 |

at Bulldog Stadium, Fresno, CA

- Date: October 24, 2020
- Game time: 1:30 p.m. HST
- Game weather: Temperature: 77 °F (25 °C) • Wind: E 5 MPH • Weather: Partly Cloudy
- Game attendance: 0
- Referee: Stephen Baker
- TV announcers (SPEC PPV): Robert Kekaula (play-by-play) & Rich Miano (analyst)
- Box Score, Hawaii at Fresno State /// Pregame Notes /// Post Game Notes

Game information

First Quarter

- (11:34) FS TD – Ronnie Rivers 7-yard rush, Cesar Silva kick
  Drive: 5 plays, 26 yards, 3:22; Fresno State 7–0
- (4:00) UH TD – Chevan Cordeiro 20-yard rush, Matthew Shipley kick
  Drive: 5 plays, 37 yards, 1:50; Tied 7–7

Second Quarter

- (7:12) UH FG – Matthew Shipley 34-yard field goal
  Drive: 13 plays, 73 yards, 5:37; Hawaii 10–7
- (1:50) FS TD – Juan Rodriguez 18-yard pass from Jake Haener, Cesar Silva kick MISSED
  Drive: 2 plays, 33 yards, 0:11; Fresno State 13–7
- (0:27) UH TD – Chevan Cordeiro 3-yard rush, Matthew Shipley kick
  Drive: 6 plays, 72 yards, 1:17; Hawaii 17–13

Third Quarter

- (6:18) UH TD – Calvin Turner 2-yard rush, Matthew Shipley kick
  Drive: 14 plays, 76 yards, 6:31; Hawaii 24–13
- (3:41) FS FG – Cesar Silva 22-yard field goal
  Drive: 7 plays, 70 yards, 2:37; Hawaii 24–16

Fourth Quarter

- (12:08) UH FG – Matthew Shipley 24-yard field goal
  Drive: 9 plays, 62 yards, 2:53; Hawaii 27–16
- (10:13) FS FG – Cesar Silva 25-yard field goal
  Drive: 8 plays, 68 yards, 1:55; Hawaii 27–19
- (4:52) UH TD – Calvin Turner 4-yard rush, Matthew Shipley kick
  Drive: 12 plays, 70 yards, 5:15; Hawaii 34–19

Passing

UH – Chevan Cordeiro: 20/30, 229 yards
FS – Jake Haener: 17/31, 289 yards, 1 TD, 3 INT

Rushing

UH – Chevan Cordeiro: 13 carries, 116 yards, 2 TD
FS – Ronnie Rivers: 18 carries, 79 yards, 1 TD

Receiving

UH – Jared Smart: 7 receptions, 89 yards
FS – Keric Wheatfall: 3 receptions, 73 yards

=== At Wyoming ===
Hawaii Rainbow Warriors at Wyoming Cowboys

| Quarter | 1 | 2 | 3 | 4 | Total |
|---|---|---|---|---|---|
| Rainbow Warriors | 0 | 7 | 0 | 0 | 7 |
| Cowboys | 10 | 0 | 7 | 14 | 31 |

at War Memorial Stadium, Laramie, WY

- Date: October 30, 2020
- Game time: 3:45 p.m. HST
- Game weather: Temperature: 36 °F (2 °C) • Wind: NNE 7 MPH • Weather: Clear
- Game attendance: 6,232
- Referee: Christian Watson
- TV announcers (FS1): Chris Myers (play-by-play) & Petros Papadakis (analyst)
- Box Score, Hawaii at Wyoming /// Pregame Notes /// Post Game Notes

Game information

First Quarter

- (12:53) WYO TD – Xazavian Valladay 18-yard rush, John Hoyland kick
  Drive: 5 plays, 62 yards, 2:07; Wyoming 7–0
- (9:55) WYO FG – John Hoyland 30-yard FG
  Drive: 6 plays, 12 yards, 2:19; Wyoming 10–0

Second Quarter

- (1:04) UH TD – Dae Dae Hunter 3-yard rush, Matthew Shipley kick
  Drive: 6 plays, 80 yards, 2:35; Wyoming 10–7

Third Quarter

- (4:22) WYO TD – Trey Smith 1-yard rush, John Hoyland kick
  Drive: 11 plays, 75 yards, 4:51; Wyoming 17–7

Fourth Quarter

- (8:19) WYO TD – Xazavian Valladay 6-yard rush, John Hoyland kick
  Drive: 4 plays, 17 yards, 1:18; Wyoming 24–7
- (1:48) WYO TD – Trey Smith 2-yard rush, John Hoyland kick
  Drive: 8 plays, 38 yards, 4:38; Wyoming 31–7

Passing

UH – Chevan Cordeiro: 11/26, 110 yards, 1 INT
WYO – Levi Williams: 9/18, 112 yards

Rushing

UH – Miles Reed: 7 carries, 54 yards
WYO – Xazavian Valladay: 32 carries, 162 yards, 2 TD

Receiving

UH – Zion Bowens: 1 reception, 47 yards
WYO – Xazavian Valladay: 2 receptions, 32 yards

=== New Mexico ===
New Mexico Lobos at Hawaii Rainbow Warriors

| Quarter | 1 | 2 | 3 | 4 | Total |
|---|---|---|---|---|---|
| Lobos | 17 | 3 | 7 | 6 | 33 |
| Rainbow Warriors | 7 | 7 | 14 | 11 | 39 |

at Aloha Stadium, Honolulu, HI

- Date: November 7, 2020
- Game time: 6:00 p.m. HST
- Game weather: Temperature: 82 °F (28 °C) • Wind: ENE 13 MPH • Weather: Humid
- Game attendance: 0
- Referee: Timothy Davis
- TV announcers (SPEC PPV): Robert Kekaula (play-by-play) & Rich Miano (analyst)
- Box Score, New Mexico at Hawaii /// Pregame Notes /// Postgame Notes

Game information

First Quarter

- (14:19) UNM TD – Jordan Kress 52-yard pass from Tevaka Tuioti, George Steinkamp kick
  Drive: 3 plays, 65 yards, 0:41; New Mexico 7–0
- (10:21) UH TD – Chevan Cordeiro 5-yard rush, Matthew Shipley kick
  Drive: 12 plays, 67 yards, 3:55; Tied 7–7
- (5:34) UNM FG – George Steinkamp 27-yard field goal
  Drive: 10 plays, 61 yards, 4:39; New Mexico 10–7
- (4:10) UNM TD – Jordan Kress 29-yard pass from Tevaka Tuioti, George Steinkamp kick
  Drive: 1 play, 29 yards, 0:07; New Mexico 17–7

Second Quarter

- (14:50) UNM FG – George Steinkamp 49-yard field goal
  Drive: 6 plays, 46 yards, 2:25; New Mexico 20–7
- (3:55) UH TD – Nick Mardner 42-yard pass from Chevan Cordeiro, Matthew Shipley kick
  Drive: 11 plays, 89 yards, 4:23; New Mexico 20–14

Third Quarter

- (13:05) UH TD – Zion Bowens 42-yard pass from Chevan Cordeiro, Matthew Shipley kick
  Drive: 5 plays, 75 yards, 1:55; Hawaii 21–20
- (11:55) UH TD – Zion Bowens 40-yard pass from Chevan Cordeiro, Matthew Shipley kick
  Drive: 2 plays, 40 yards, 0:13; Hawaii 28–20
- (9:33) UNM TD – Nathanie Jones 26-yard rush, George Steinkamp kick
  Drive: 7 plays, 76 yards, 2:17; Hawaii 28–27

Fourth Quarter

- (13:31) UNM FG – George Steinkamp 24-yard field goal
  Drive: 10 plays, 44 yards, 4:17; New Mexico 30–28
- (12:19) UH TD – Calvin Turner 64-yard pass from Chevan Cordeiro, Chevan Cordeiro–Jared Smart pass
  Drive: 3 plays, 75 yards, 1:12; Hawaii 36–30
- (6:33) UH FG – Matthew Shipley 41-yard field goal
  Drive: 9 plays, 55 yards, 3:20; Hawaii 39–30
- (1:21) UNM FG – George Steinkamp 42-yard field goal
  Drive: 7 plays, 31 yards, 1:41; Hawaii 39–33

Passing

UNM – Tevaka Tuioti: 17/31, 181 yards, 2 TD
UH – Chevan Cordeiro: 33/43, 410 yards, 4 TD, 2 INT

Rushing

UNM – Nathanie Jones: 13 rush, 96 yards, 1 TD
UH – Chevan Cordeiro: 10 rush, 39 yards, 1 TD

Receiving

UNM – Jordan Kress, 3 receptions, 93 yards, 2 TD
UH – Nick Mardner: 6 receptions, 147 yards, 1 TD

=== At San Diego State ===
Hawaii Rainbow Warriors at San Diego State Aztecs

| Quarter | 1 | 2 | 3 | 4 | Total |
|---|---|---|---|---|---|
| Rainbow Warriors | 0 | 0 | 3 | 7 | 10 |
| Aztecs | 14 | 14 | 0 | 6 | 34 |

at Dignity Health Sports Park, Carson, CA

- Date: November 14, 2020
- Game time: 11:00 a.m. HST
- Game weather: Temperature: 68 °F (20 °C) • Wind: W 7 MPH • Weather: Clear
- Game attendance: 0
- Referee: Stephen Baron
- TV announcers (SPEC PPV): Robert Kekaula (play-by-play) & Rich Miano (analyst)
- Box Score, Hawaii at San Diego State /// Pregame Notes /// Postgame Notes

Game information

First Quarter

- (3:26) SDSU TD – Jordan Byrd 51-yard rush, Matt Araiza kick
  Drive: 2 plays, 51 yards, 0:16; SDSU 7–0
- (1:08) SDSU TD – Greg Bell 62-yard rush, Matt Araiza kick
  Drive: 1 play, 62 yards, 0:11; SDSU 14–0

Second Quarter

- (10:25) SDSU TD – Greg Bell 3-yard rush, Matt Araiza kick
  Drive: 3 plays, 13 yards, 1:15; SDSU 21–0
- (1:20) SDSU TD – Segun Olubi 71-yard interception return, Matt Araiza kick
  Drive: 0 plays, 0 yard, 0:00; SDSU 28–0

Third Quarter

- (5:13) UH FG – Matthew Shipley 27-yard field goal
  Drive: 10 plays, 50 yards, 3:08; SDSU 28–3

Fourth Quarter

- (12:51) SDSU FG – Matt Araiza 27-yard field goal
  Drive: 4 plays, 1 yard, 2:04; SDSU 31–3
- (12:00) UH TD – Calvin Turner 75-yard pass from Chevan Cordeiro
  Drive: 2 plays, 75 yards, 0:51; SDSU 31–10
- (2:59) SDSU FG – Matt Araiza 36-yard field goal
  Drive: 16 plays, 57 yards, 9:01; SDSU 34–10

Passing

UH – Chevan Cordeiro: 17/35, 209 yards, 1 TD, 1 INT
SDSU – Carson Baker: 4/13, 30 yards, 2 INT

Rushing

UH – Chevan Cordeiro: 20 carries, 85 yards
SDSU – Greg Bell: 19 carries, 175 yards, 2 TD

Receiving

UH – Calvin Turner: 4 receptions, 116 yards, 1 TD
SDSU – Chance Bell: 1 reception, 14 yards

=== Boise State ===
Boise State Broncos at Hawaii Rainbow Warriors

| Quarter | 1 | 2 | 3 | 4 | Total |
|---|---|---|---|---|---|
| Broncos | 3 | 16 | 21 | 0 | 40 |
| Rainbow Warriors | 3 | 0 | 14 | 15 | 32 |

at Aloha Stadium, Honolulu, HI

- Date: November 21, 2020
- Game time: 6:00 p.m. HST
- Game weather: Temperature: 81 °F (27 °C) • Wind: E 21 MPH • Weather: Slightly Humid
- Game attendance: 0
- Referee: Mike Cuttone
- TV announcers (CBSSN): John Sadak (play-by-play) & Randy Cross (analyst)
- Box Score, Boise State at Hawaii /// Pregame Notes /// Postgame Notes

Game information

First Quarter

- (4:36) UH FG – Matthew Shipley 27-yard field goal
  Drive: 15 plays, 76 yards, 5:38; Hawaii 3–0
- (1:13) BS FG – Jonah Dalmas 32-yard field goal
  Drive: 9 plays, 60 yards, 3:23; Tied 3–3

Second Quarter

- (10:09) BS FG – Jonah Dalmas 42-yard field goal
  Drive: 12 plays, 55 yards, 5:06; Boise State 6–3
- (5:12) BS TD – Khalil Shakir 38-yard pass from Hank Bachmeier, Jonah Dalmas kick BLOCKED
  Drive: 2 plays, 44 yards, 0:37; Boise State 12–3
- (0:54) BS TD – Khalil Shakir 3-yard pass from CT Thomas, Jonah Dalmas kick
  Drive: 10 plays, 60 yards, 2:58; Boise State 19–3

Third Quarter

- (11:09) UH TD – Calvin Turner 1-yard rush, Chevan Cordeiro rush FAILED
  Drive: 13 plays, 87 yards, 3:51; Boise State 19–9
- (10:54) BS TD – Avery Williams 99-yard kick return, Jonah Dalmas kick
  Drive: 0 plays, 0 yards, 0:00; Boise State 26–9
- (8:18) BS TD – Andrew Van Buren 11-yard rush, Jonah Dalmas kick
  Drive: 3 plays, 26 yards, 1:05; Boise State 33–9
- (5:36) UH TD – Calvin Turner 36-yard pass from Chevan Cordeiro, Calvin Turner rush
  Drive: 9 plays, 75 yards, 2:42; Boise State 33–17
- (3:38) BS TD – Andrew Van Buren 11-yard rush, Jonah Dalmas kick
  Drive: 5 plays, 79 yards, 1:52; Boise State 40–17

Fourth Quarter

- (9:56) UH TD – Calvin Turner 15-yard pass from Chevan Cordeiro, Matthew Shipley kick
  Drive: 8 plays, 72 yards, 3:31; Boise State 40–24
- (4:52) UH TD – Jared Smart 4-yard pass from Chevan Cordeiro, Calvin Turner rush
  Drive: 12 plays, 64 yards, 3:37; Boise State 40–32

Passing

BS – Hank Bachmeier: 21/31, 278 yards, 1 TD, 1 INT
UH – Chevan Cordeiro: 25/48, 253 yards, 3 TD

Rushing

BS – Andrew Van Buren: 27 carries, 117 yards, 2 TD
UH – Chevan Cordeiro: 18 carries, 103 yards

Receiving

BS – Khalil Shakir: 11 receptions, 130 yards, 2 TD
UH – Miles Reed: 6 receptions, 69 yards

=== Nevada ===
Nevada Wolf Pack at Hawaii Rainbow Warriors

| Quarter | 1 | 2 | 3 | 4 | Total |
|---|---|---|---|---|---|
| Wolf Pack | 0 | 7 | 0 | 14 | 21 |
| Rainbow Warriors | 0 | 10 | 7 | 7 | 24 |

at Aloha Stadium, Honolulu, HI

- Date: November 28, 2020
- Game time: 6:00 p.m. HST
- Game weather: Temperature: 77 °F (25 °C) • Wind: NE 10 MPH • Weather: Humid
- Game attendance: 0
- Referee: Christian Watson
- TV announcers (SPEC PPV): Robert Kekaula (play-by-play) & Rich Miano (analyst)
- Box Score, Nevada at Hawaii /// Pregame Notes /// Postgame Notes

Game information

Second Quarter

- (10:11) UH FG – Matthew Shipley 31-yard field goal
  Drive: 14 plays, 80 yards, 5:29; Hawaii 3–0
- (2:57) NEV TD – Cole Turner 4-yard pass from Carson Strong, Brandon Talton kick
  Drive: 13 plays, 81 yards, 7:08; Nevada 7–3
- (0:59) UH TD – Calvin Turner 7-yard pass from Chevan Cordeiro, Matthew Shipley kick
  Drive: 8 plays, 75 yards, 1:58; Hawaii 10–7

Third Quarter

- (3:20) UH TD – Miles Reed 4-yard rush, Matthew Shipley kick
  Drive: 10 plays, 99 yards, 4:02; Hawaii 17–7

Fourth Quarter

- (14:28) NEV TD – Toa Taua 1-yard rush, Brandon Talton kick
  Drive: 9 plays, 75 yards, 3:52; Hawaii 17–14
- (9:31) UH TD – Chevan Cordeiro 2-yard rush, Matthew Shipley kick
  Drive: 14 plays, 75 yards, 4:57; Hawaii 24–14
- (5:38) NEV TD – Tory Horton 18-yard pass from Carson Strong, Brandon Talton kick
  Drive: 10 plays, 75 yards, 3:53; Hawaii 24–21

Passing

NEV – Carson Strong: 20/25, 168 yards, 2 TD
UH – Chevan Cordeiro: 26/32, 246 yards, 1 TD

Rushing

NEV – Toa Taua: 20 carries, 131 yards, 1 TD
UH – Chevan Cordeiro: 15 carries, 76 yards, 1 TD

Receiving

NEV – Cole Turner: 6 receptions, 48 yards, 1 TD
UH – Calvin Turner: 10 receptions, 77 yards, 1 TD

=== At San Jose State ===
San Jose State Spartans at Hawaii Rainbow Warriors

| Quarter | 1 | 2 | 3 | 4 | Total |
|---|---|---|---|---|---|
| Spartans | 21 | 0 | 7 | 7 | 35 |
| Rainbow Warriors | 0 | 10 | 7 | 7 | 24 |

at Aloha Stadium, Honolulu, HI

- Date: December 5, 2020
- Game time: 1:00 p.m. HST
- Game weather: Temperature: 85 °F (29 °C) • Wind: N 7 MPH • Weather: Slightly Humid
- Game attendance: 0
- Referee: Timothy Davis
- TV announcers (SPEC PPV): Robert Kekaula (play-by-play) & Rich Miano (analyst)
- Box Score, San Jose State at Hawaii /// Pregame Notes /// Postgame Notes

Game information

First Quarter

- (11:43) SJSU TD – Isaiah Holiness 2-yard pass from Nick Starkel, Matt Mercurio kick
  Drive: 9 plays, 75 yards, 3:17; San Jose State 7–0
- (9:36) SJSU TD – Tyler Nevens 72-yard rush, Matt Mercurio kick
  Drive: 2 plays, 75 yards, 0:28; San Jose State 14–0
- (6:24) SJSU TD – Tyler Nevens 10-yard rush, Matt Mercurio kick
  Drive: 6 plays, 53 yards, 1:57; San Jose State 21–0

Second Quarter

- (9:21) UH FG – Matthew Shipley 25-yard field goal
  Drive: 11 plays, 72 yards, 3:48; San Jose State 21–3
- (3:12) UH TD – Dae Dae Hunter 10-yard pass from Chevan Cordeiro, Matthew Shipley kick
  Drive: 5 plays, 39 yards, 2:14; San Jose State 21–10

Third Quarter

- (9:48) UH TD – Rico Bussey 11-yard pass from Chevan Cordeiro, Matthew Shipley kick
  Drive: 12 plays, 74 yards, 5:07; San Jose State 21–17
- (2:17) SJSU TD – Kairee Robinson 2-yard rush, Matt Mercurio kick
  Drive: 18 plays, 70 yards, 7:31; San Jose State 28–17

Fourth Quarter

- (12:03) SJSU TD – Tre Walker 50-yard pass from Nick Starkel, Matt Mercurio kick
  Drive: 7 plays, 80 yards, 2:44; San Jose State 35–17
- (2:24) UH TD – Chevan Cordeiro 4-yard rush, Matthew Shipley kick
  Drive: 10 plays, 60 yards, 4:40; San Jose State 35–24

Passing

SJSU – Nick Starkel: 11/23, 167 yards, 2 TD, 1 INT
UH – Chevan Cordeiro: 28/42, 238 yards, 2 TD, 1 INT

Rushing

SJSU – Tyler Nevens: 16 carries, 152 yards, 2 TD
UH – Chevan Cordeiro: 11 carries, 36 yards, 1 TD

Receiving

SJSU – Tre Walker: 2 receptions, 64 yards, 1 TD
UH – Rico Bussey: 8 receptions, 69 yards, 1 TD

=== UNLV ===
UNLV Rebels at Hawaii Rainbow Warriors

| Quarter | 1 | 2 | 3 | 4 | Total |
|---|---|---|---|---|---|
| Rebels | 0 | 7 | 14 | 0 | 21 |
| Rainbow Warriors | 7 | 14 | 14 | 3 | 38 |

at Aloha Stadium, Honolulu, HI

- Date: December 12, 2020
- Game time: 6:00 p.m. HST
- Game weather: Temperature: 79 °F (26 °C) • Wind: ENE 11 MPH • Weather: Humidity: 60%
- Game attendance: 0
- Referee: Stephen Baron
- TV announcers (SPEC PPV): Robert Kekaula (play-by-play), Rich Miano (analyst)
- Box Score, UNLV at Hawaii /// Pregame Notes /// Postgame Notes

Game information

First Quarter

- (12:34) UH TD – Chevan Cordeiro 54-yard rush, Matthew Shipley kick
  Drive: 2 plays, 58 yards, 0:38; Hawaii 7–0

Second Quarter

- (13:27) UH TD – Dae Dae Hunter 1-yard rush, Matthew Shipley kick
  Drive: 8 plays, 57 yards, 3:08; Hawaii 14–0
- (1:45) UH TD – Calvin Turner 28-yard rush, Matthew Shipley kick
  Drive: 5 plays, 67 yards, 1:57; Hawaii 21–0
- (0:53) UNLV TD – Kyle Williams 19-yard pass from Max Gilliam, Daniel Gutierrez kick
  Drive: 6 plays, 75 yards, 0:52; Hawaii 21–7

Third Quarter

- (13:00) UH TD – Koali Nishigaya 4-yard rush, Matthew Shipley kick
  Drive: 5 plays, 83 yards, 1:46; Hawaii 28–7
- (9:34) UNLV TD – Charles Williams 2-yard rush, Daniel Gutierrez kick
  Drive: 10 plays, 75 yards, 3:26; Hawaii 28–14
- (1:16) UH TD – Chevan Cordeiro 12-yard rush, Matthew Shipley kick
  Drive: 12 plays, 70 yards, 3:51; Hawaii 35–14
- (0:12) UNLV TD – Charles Williams 49-yard rush, Daniel Gutierrez kick
  Drive: 3 plays, 75 yards, 1:04; Hawaii 35–21

Fourth Quarter

- (3:05) UH FG – Matthew Shipley 44-yard field goal
  Drive: 6 plays, 28 yards, 2:39; Hawaii 38–21

Passing

UNLV – Max Gilliam: 16/27, 187 yards, 1 TD, 1 INT
UH – Chevan Cordeiro: 20/33, 252 yards, 1 INT

Rushing

UNLV – Charles Williams: 22 carries, 148 yards, 2 TD
UH – Chevan Cordeiro: 12 carries, 88 yards, 2 TD

Receiving

UNLV – Kyle Williams: 10 receptions, 144 yards, 1 TD
UH – Calvin Turner: 2 receptions, 77 yards

=== Houston – New Mexico Bowl ===
New Mexico Bowl: Hawaii Rainbow Warriors at Houston Cougars

| Quarter | 1 | 2 | 3 | 4 | Total |
|---|---|---|---|---|---|
| Rainbow Warriors | 14 | 7 | 7 | 0 | 28 |
| Cougars | 0 | 0 | 14 | 0 | 14 |

at Toyota Stadium, Frisco, Texas

- Date: December 24, 2020
- Game time: 10:30 a.m. HST
- Game weather: Temperature: 50 °F (10 °C) • Wind: WNW 8 MPH • Weather: Sunny
- Game attendance: 2,060
- Referee: Chris Bynum
- TV announcers (ESPN): John Schriffen (play-by-play), Rene Ingoglia (analyst) & Kris Budden (sideline)
- Box Score, Hawaii at Houston, 2020 New Mexico Bowl /// Pregame Notes /// Postgame Notes

Game information

First Quarter

- (10:43) HAW TD – Dae Dae Hunter 3-yard pass from Chevan Cordeiro, Matthew Shipley kick
  Drive: 2 plays, 8 yards, 0:35; Hawaii 7–0
- (3:35) HAW TD – Calvin Turner 75-yard pass from Chevan Cordeiro, Matthew Shipley kick
  Drive: 1 play, 75 yards, 0:12; Hawaii 14–0

Second Quarter

- (8:05) HAW TD – Jonah Laulu 4-yard pass from Chevan Cordeiro, Matthew Shipley kick
  Drive: 7 plays, 80 yards, 3:17; Hawaii 21–0

Third Quarter

- (7:39) HOU TD – Tank Dell 7-yard pass from Clayton Tune, Dalton Witherspoon kick
  Drive: 17 plays, 75 yards, 7:21; Hawaii 21–7
- (3:45) HOU TD – Cristi Trahan 26-yard pass from Clayton Tune, Dalton Witherspoon kick
  Drive: 5 plays, 83 yards, 2:03; Hawaii 21–14
- (3:29) HAW TD – Calvin Turner 92-yard kick return, Matthew Shipley kick
  Drive: 0 plays, 0 yards, 0:00; Hawaii 28–14

| Statistics | HAW | HOU |
|---|---|---|
| First downs | 11 | 20 |
| Plays–yards | 57–267 | 81–307 |
| Rushes–yards | 34–131 | 38–58 |
| Passing yards | 136 | 249 |
| Passing: comp–att–int | 15–23–0 | 21–43–3 |
| Turnovers | | |
| Time of possession | 26:56 | 33:04 |

| Team | Category | Player | Statistics |
|---|---|---|---|
| Hawaii | Passing | Chevan Cordeiro | 15/23, 136 yards, 3 TD |
| Hawaii | Rushing | Calvin Turner | 12 carries, 60 yards |
| Hawaii | Receiving | Calvin Turner | 4 receptions, 88 yards, 1 TD |
| Houston | Passing | Clayton Tune | 20/38, 216 yards, 2 TD, 3 INT |
| Houston | Rushing | Mulbah Car | 15 carries, 47 yards |
| Houston | Receiving | Tank Dell | 6 receptions, 112 yards, 1 TD |
