= Joseph Hadley =

Joseph Hadley may refer to:

- Joseph William Hadley (1819–1898), Canadian ship captain
- Joe Hadley, American boxer
- Jozuf Hadley, pen name Bradajo (born 1932), American poet and artist
- Joseph Hadley, English miller, party to Hadley v Baxendale
