= Morioka (disambiguation) =

Morioka is the capital city of Iwate Prefecture located in the Tohoku region of northern Japan.

Morioka may also refer to:

- Morioka (surname), a Japanese surname
- Morioka Domain, a former subdivision of Japan
- Morioka University, a university in Takizawa, Iwate, Japan
