= Vanterpool =

Vanterpool is a surname. Notable people with the surname include:

- David Vanterpool (born 1973), American basketball player and coach
- Micah Vanterpool (born 1999), American football player
- Sylvia Vanterpool (1935–2011), American singer
