= Trent Figg =

American college football coach

Current position
- Title: Head coach
- Team: Calvin
- Conference: MIAA
- Record: 19–11

Biographical details
- Born: Chillicothe, Missouri, U.S.
- Education: William Jewell College (B.S.); Northwest Missouri State University (M.Ed.)

Playing career
- 2004–2007: William Jewell
- Positions: Defensive back, outside linebacker

Coaching career (HC unless noted)
- 2008–2009: William Jewell (OLB/ops)
- 2010: William Jewell (RB/ops)
- 2011: William Jewell (LB)
- 2012: William Jewell (DB)
- 2013: Arizona State (GA)
- 2014: Southern Arkansas (DB/STC)
- 2015–2016: William Jewell (DC/AHC)
- 2017: Southern Arkansas (DC/AHC/RC)
- 2018–2019: Missouri State (STC/RB)
- 2020: Hawaii (chief of staff)
- 2021: Hawaii (AHC/DB)
- 2022: Oregon (OA)
- 2023–present: Calvin

Head coaching record
- Overall: 19–11

Trent Figg is an American college football coach. He is the head football coach for Calvin University, a position he has held since 2023. He was previously the associate head coach of the defense and defensive backs coach for the University of Hawaiʻi at Mānoa. Figg played college football at William Jewell College in Missouri, where he also spent the first 5 years of his coaching career upon graduation. While primarily a defensive coach, he has spent multiple stints on the offensive side of the ball. Besides Hawai'i and William Jewell, Figg has also coached at Missouri State, Arizona State, and Southern Arkansas.

== Playing career ==
Figg was a member of the William Jewell Cardinals football team from 2004 to 2007. He spent time at cornerback, safety, and outside linebacker. He was named an Academic All-American in 2007.

== Coaching career ==
Following his graduation from William Jewell, he joined the Cardinals' coaching staff for the 2008 season as outside linebackers coach and was also put in charge of operations. Figg was named running backs coach in 2010 and went on to coach linebackers in 2011 and defensive backs in 2012 for the Cardinals. In 2013, Figg spent one year as a defensive graduate assistant for Arizona State. The following year, Figg went to Southern Arkansas, where he was named special teams coordinator and defensive backs coach.

In 2015, he returned to William Jewell for a second stint; he stayed for two seasons as the defensive coordinator and associate head coach for the Cardinals. After returning to Southern Arkansas for the 2017 season as defensive coordinator, associate head coach, and recruiting coordinator, Figg was hired at Missouri State in 2018. There he served as the special teams coordinator and running backs coach for two seasons. In 2020, he departed to take the chief of staff position with the Hawaii program. In March 2021, he was promoted to an on-field position as the associate head coach of the defense and defensive backs coach for the Rainbow Warriors.

Near the end of the season, Figg was mentioned in a scandal centered around allegations surrounding former Hawai'i head coach Todd Graham's treatment toward players and football alumni. After Graham announced his resignation and Timmy Chang took over as head coach, Figg was not retained.

While on the staff during his second stint at William Jewell, Figg was selected to serve as the defensive coordinator for the United States men's national American football team in the 2016 World University American Football Championship, held in Monterrey. The United States finished in second place, with Mexico defeating them in the final game to claim the championship.

On January 6, 2023, Figg was named the first football coach at Calvin University in Grand Rapids, Michigan.

== Personal life ==
Figg was born in Chillicothe, Missouri. He attended William Jewell College, graduating in 2008 with a Bachelor of Science in secondary education and physical education. In 2012, he earned a Master of Education in educational leadership from Northwest Missouri State University. Figg and his wife Tori (née Hallett) have three children.

== Head coaching record ==
Year	Team	Overall	Conference	Standing	Bowl/playoffs	AFCA^{#}	D3^{°}
Calvin Knights (Michigan Intercollegiate Athletic Association) (2024–present)
2024	Calvin	2–8	0–7	8th			
2025	Calvin	7–3	4–3	4th			
2026	Calvin	10–0	7–0	1st		11	13
Calvin:		19–11	11–10				
Total:		19–11					
