= 2020 Boise State Broncos football team =

American college football season

2020 Boise State Broncos football

MW Championship Game, L 20–34 vs. San Jose State
- Conference: Mountain West Conference
- Record: 5–2 (5–0 MW)
- Head coach: Bryan Harsin (7th season)
- Offensive coordinator: Eric Kiesau (2nd season)
- Offensive scheme: Multiple
- Co-defensive coordinators: Spencer Danielson (2nd season); Jeff Schmedding (2nd season)
- Base defense: Multiple
- Home stadium: Albertsons Stadium

Uniform
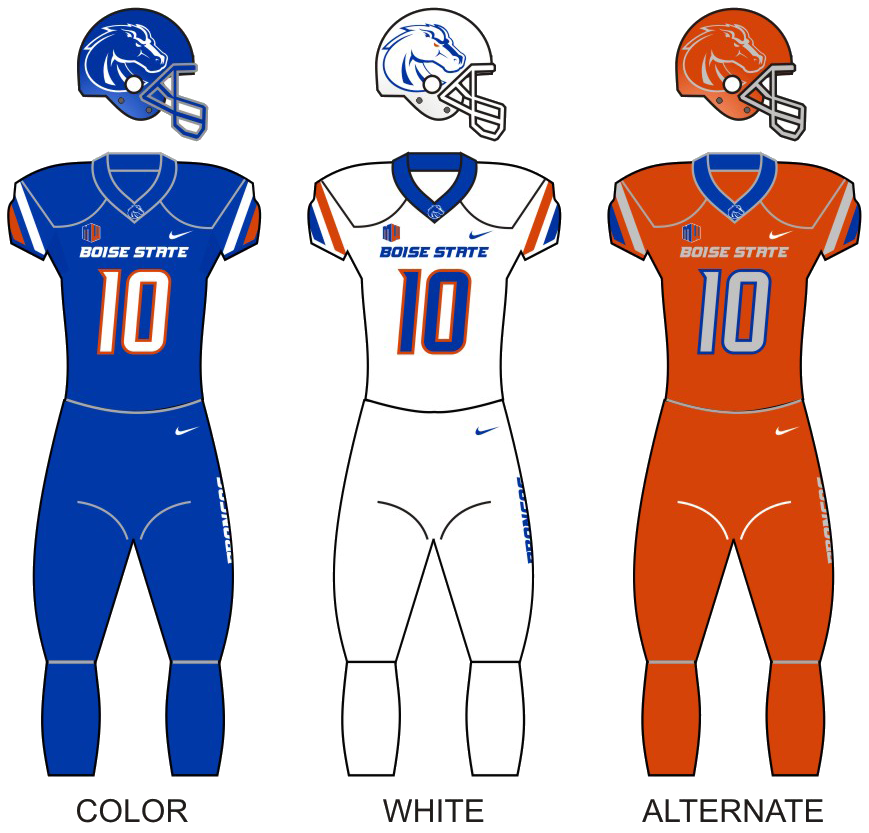

2020 Mountain West Conference football standings
	Conf.			Overall
Team	W		L	W		L
No. 24 San Jose State y$	6	–	0	7	–	1
Boise State y	5	–	0	5	–	2
Nevada	6	–	2	7	–	2
San Diego State	4	–	2	4	–	4
Hawaii	4	–	4	5	–	4
Fresno State	3	–	3	3	–	3
Air Force	2	–	2	3	–	3
Wyoming	2	–	4	2	–	4
New Mexico	2	–	5	2	–	5
Colorado State	1	–	3	1	–	3
Utah State	1	–	5	1	–	5
UNLV	0	–	6	0	–	6
Championship: San Jose State 34, Boise State 20
$ – Conference champion; y – Championship game participant; Note: Due to COVID-19, the Mountain West suspended the season, but later decided to begin play on October 24.; Rankings from AP Poll

The 2020 Boise State Broncos football team represented Boise State University during the 2020 NCAA Division I FBS football season. The Broncos played their home games at Albertsons Stadium in Boise, Idaho, as members of the Mountain West Conference. They were led by seventh-year head coach Bryan Harsin.

After the season was suspended due to the COVID-19 pandemic, then reinstated, the Broncos played seven games, compiling a 5–2 record (5–0 in conference play). The team then lost to San Jose State in the Mountain West Championship Game. On December 20, the team announced that it had decided to forgo playing in any bowl game. The program had appeared in 18 consecutive bowl games, dating back to the 2002 Humanitarian Bowl.

On December 22, head coach Bryan Harsin resigned to become the head coach at Auburn. He finished at Boise State with a seven-year record of 69–19.

== Schedule ==
Boise State announced its 2020 football schedule on February 27, 2020. The 2020 schedule consisted of 7 home and 5 away games in the regular season. On August 10, 2020, the Mountain West Conference announced the suspension of the football season due to the COVID-19 pandemic. The new schedule was released by the Mountain West on October 1, 2020.

Date	Time	Opponent	Rank	Site	TV	Result	Attendance
October 24	5:00 p.m.	Utah State^{†}		Albertsons Stadium; Boise, ID	FS1	W 42–13	0 (Note: Game played behind closed doors)
October 31	4:00 p.m.	at Air Force	No. 25	Falcon Stadium; Colorado Springs, CO	CBSSN	W 49–30	500
November 6	7:45 p.m.	No. 9 BYU*	No. 21	Albertsons Stadium; Boise, ID	FS1	L 17–51	1,100
November 12	6:00 p.m.	Colorado State		Albertsons Stadium; Boise, ID	FS1	W 52–21	1,100
November 21	9:00 p.m.	at Hawaii		Aloha Stadium; Halawa, HI	CBSSN	W 40–32	0 (Note: Game played behind closed doors)
November 28	2:00 p.m.	San Jose State		Albertsons Stadium; Boise, ID	Fox	Cancelled	
December 4	7:30 p.m.	at UNLV		Allegiant Stadium; Paradise, NV	CBSSN	Cancelled	
December 12	4:00 p.m.	at Wyoming		War Memorial Stadium; Laramie, WY	CBSSN	W 17–9	2,978
December 19	2:15 p.m.	vs. No. 24 San Jose State		Sam Boyd Stadium; Whitney, NV (MW Championship Game)	Fox	L 20–34	0
*Non-conference game; ^{†}Homecoming; Rankings from AP Poll released prior to the game; All times are in Mountain time

== Roster ==
2020 Boise State Broncos football team roster
Players
Coaches
Offense

Pos.	#	Name	Class
WR	1	Octavius Evans	Sr
WR	2	Khalil Shakir	Jr
TE	3	Riley Smith	So
WR	6	C. T. Thomas	Sr
WR	7	Latrell Caples	Fr
QB	8	Cade Fennegan	Fr
QB	10	Chase Cord	Jr
QB	14	Andy Peters	Fr
WR	15	Maclaine Griffin	So
QB	16	Jack Sears	Jr
WR	18	Billy Bowens	So
QB	19	Hank Bachmeier	So
RB	21	Andrew Van Buren	Jr
WR	23	Khyheem Waleed	Fr
RB	24	George Holani	So
RB	25	Taequan Tyler	So
WR	27	Shea Whiting	Fr
RB	31	Obi Gee	Fr
WR	32	Trevor Cole	Fr
RB	33	Tyler Crowe	Fr
RB	37	Danny Smith	So
TE	40	Russell Corrigan	Fr
OL	50	Riden Leong	Fr
OL	51	Dalton Lins	So
OL	55	Kekaniokoa Holomalia-Gonzalez	So
OL	57	Nathan Cardona	Fr
OL	62	Kyle Juergens	Fr
OL	66	Ben Dooley	Fr
OL	68	Jake Stetz	Sr
OL	69	Garrett Curran	So
OL	70	John Ojukwu	Jr
OL	71	Donte Harrington	Sr
OL	72	Dallas Holliday	So
OL	73	Nick Crabtree	Sr
OL	74	Jacob Golden	Fr
OL	75	Brandon Hernandez	Fr
OL	77	Uzo Osuji	Sr
OL	78	Julian Simpson	Fr
TE	80	Mason Sikes	Sr
TE	81	Austin Bolt	Fr
WR	82	Stefan Cobbs	So
WR	83	Cole Wright	Fr
WR	84	Matt Greenwald	Fr
TE	85	John Bates	Sr
TE	86	Tyler Eiguren	Fr
TE	87	Kaden DeLuna	So
TE	88	Tyneil Hopper	So
WR	89	Connor Riddle	So

Defense

Pos.	#	Name	Class
S	0	JL Skinner	So
CB	2	Jalen Walker	Sr
OLB	3	Brandon Hawkins	Jr
S	4	Rodney Robinson	Fr
S	5	Evan Tyler	GS
MLB	7	Ezekiel Noa	Jr
CB	8	Markel Reed	So
OLB	9	Brock Miller	Sr
CB	13	Marques Evans	Jr
CB	14	Kaonohi Kaniho	Fr
CB	16	Jonathan Earl	Jr
CB	17	Donovan Clark	Fr
DE	19	Aisa Kelemete	Jr
CB	20	Roman Kafentzis	Jr
CB	21	Tyreque Jones	Jr
CB	22	Tyric LeBeauf	So
CB	24	Damon Cole	Jr
MLB	25	Benton Wickersham	Sr
CB	26	Avery Williams	Sr
CB	28	Kekaula Kaniho	Sr
CB	29	Chris Mitchell	So
DE	30	Isaiah Bagnah	Fr
S	34	Alexander Teubner	Fr
S	36	Semaj Verner	Fr
DE	38	Demitri Washington	So
CB	41	Jaylen Clark	Fr
S	43	Tyler Visser	Jr
OLB	44	Riley Whimpey	Sr
OLB	45	Nick Provenzano	Sr
MLB	48	Bruno DeRose	Sr
DE	49	Dylan Herberg	So
OLB	52	D. J. Schramm	So
DE	53	Sam Whitney	GS
DE	54	Gabe Hunter	Fr
DE	55	Shane Irwin	Jr
DE	56	Casey Kline	Fr
DT	58	Robert Cooper	Fr
DE	59	Jadyn Ewing	Fr
DE	60	Amari Williams	Fr
DT	90	Scale Igiehon	Jr
DT	92	Michael Callahan	Fr
DE	93	Andy Nwaoko	Fr
DT	94	Jackson Cravens	So
DT	95	Divine Obichere	Jr
DT	97	Keeghan Freeborn	So
DT	98	Herbert Gums	Fr
DT	99	Scott Matlock	So

Special teams

Pos.	#	Name	Class
K/P	35	Jonah Dalmas	Fr
LS	42	Daniel Cantrell	Jr
P	43	Gavin Wale	Fr
K/P	46	Joel Velazquez	Sr
P	49	Keola Downing	Fr
LS	65	Koby Tryggestad	Fr
K	96	Ryan Meyer	So

Head coach

- Bryan Harsin

Coordinators/assistant coaches

- Kent Riddle – Associate head coach/Tight ends
- Eric Kiesau – Offensive coordinator/Quarterbacks
- Spencer Danielson – Co-defensive coordinator/Defensive linemen
- Jeff Schmedding – Co-defensive coordinator/Inside linebackers
- Zac Alley – Special teams coordinator/Outside linebackers
- Matt Miller – Passing game coordinator/Wide receivers
- Jalil Brown – Cornerbacks
- Brad Bedell – Run game coordinator/Offensive linemen
- Winston Venable – Co-special teams coordinator/Running backs
- Gabe Franklin – Safeties/nickels
- Jeff Pitman – Director, Strength and Conditioning
- Brandon Crosby – Offensive analyst
- Danny McDonald – Defensive analyst
- Jake Casteel – Graduate assistant
- Jabril Frazier – Graduate assistant
- Jeff McDaniels – Graduate assistant
- Jared Pulu – Graduate assistant
- J. P. Sorensen – Graduate assistant
- Tanner Tallan – Graduate assistant

Legend

- (C) Team captain
- (S) Suspended
- (I) Ineligible
- Injured
- Redshirt

Roster

== Game summaries ==
=== Utah State ===
Utah State at Boise State

Team	1	2	3	4	Total
Aggies	0	0	7	6	13
• Broncos	7	21	0	14	42

- Date: October 24, 2020
- Location: Albertsons Stadium
  Boise, ID
- Game start: 5:15 p.m. MDT
- Elapsed time: 3:14
- Game attendance: 0
- Game weather: 50 °F (10 °C) • Weather: Partly Cloudy • Wind: 22 MPH NW
- Referee: Mike Cuttone • Umpire: Mark Warner • Linesman: Justin Gragg • Line judge: Carlos Owens • Back judge: M. Aaronian • Field judge: Michael Defee • Side judge: T. Castleberry • Center judge: Ian Malepeai
- TV announcers (FS1): Kevin Fitzgerald and Robert Smith

Scoring summary
1	7:28	BSU	George Holani 1 Yd Run (Jonah Dalmas Kick)	BSU 0–7
2	13:58	BSU	Khalil Shakir 52 Yd pass from Hank Bachmeier (Jonah Dalmas Kick)	BSU 0–14
2	3:23	BSU	Hank Bachmeier 6 Yd Run (Jonah Dalmas Kick)	BSU 0–21
2	0:25	BSU	George Holani 17 Yd pass from Hank Bachmeier (Jonah Dalmas Kick)	BSU 0–28
3	2:05	USU	Jaylen Warren 1 Yd Run (Nels Haltom Kick)	BSU 7–28
4	11:57	USU	Jaylen Warren 2 Yd Run (Nels Haltom PAT failed)	BSU 13–28
4	8:29	BSU	Khalil Shakir 18 Yd pass from Hank Bachmeier (Jonah Dalmas Kick)	BSU 13–35
4	1:37	BSU	Andrew Van Buren 5 Yd Run (Jonah Dalmas Kick)	BSU 13–42

Uniform Combination
Helmet	Jersey	Pants

- Passing leaders: Hank Bachmeier (BSU): 20–28, 268 YDS, 3 TD; Jason Shelley (USU): 14–27, 92 YDS, 1 INT.
- Rushing leaders: George Holani (BSU): 14 CAR, 100 YDS, 1 TD; Jaylen Warren (USU): 23 CAR, 89 YDS, 2 TD.
- Receiving leaders: Khalil Shakir (BSU): 7 REC, 123 YDS, 2 TD; Deven Thompkins (USU): 5 REC, 37 YDS.

Statistics	Utah State	Boise State
First downs	12	25
Plays–yards	70–203	67–450
Rushes–yards	43–111	35–171
Passing yards	92	279
Passing: comp–att–int	14–27–1	22–32–0
Turnovers		
Time of possession	30:00	30:00

=== At Air Force ===
Boise State at Air Force

Team	1	2	3	4	Total
• No. 25 Broncos	7	21	7	14	49
Falcons	14	3	0	13	30

- Date: October 31, 2020
- Location: Falcon Stadium
  Colorado Springs, CO
- Game start: 5:00 p.m. MDT
- Elapsed time: 3:14
- Game attendance: 500
- Game weather: 55 °F (13 °C) • Weather: Sunny • Wind: 17 MPH N
- Referee: Brandon Cruse • Umpire: Sheldon Davis • Linesman: George Gusman • Line judge: Jay Bilbo • Back judge: Donnie Aultman • Field judge: Scott Gaines • Side judge: Rick Ockey
- TV announcers (CBSSN): Carter Blackburn, Aaron Taylor and Jenny Dell (sideline)

Scoring summary
1	14:50	BSU	CT Thomas 75 Yd pass from Jack Sears (Jonah Dalmas Kick)	BSU 7–0
1	9:27	AFA	Brandon Lewis 7 Yd Run (Tevye Schuettpelz-Rohl Kick)	TIED 7–7
1	3:23	AFA	Matthew Murla 1 Yd Run (Tevye Schuettpelz-Rohl Kick)	AFA 7–14
2	13:14	BSU	Andrew Van Buren 4 Yd Run (Jonah Dalmas Kick)	TIED 14–14
2	6:53	AFA	Tevye Schuettpelz-Rohl 31 Yd Field Goal	AFA 14–17
2	2:27	BSU	Andrew Van Buren 1 Yd Run (Jonah Dalmas Kick)	BSU 21–17
2	0:47	BSU	Octavius Evans 21 Yd pass from Jack Sears (Jonah Dalmas Kick)	BSU 28–17
3	0:54	BSU	CT Thomas 26 Yd pass from Jack Sears (Jonah Dalmas Kick)	BSU 35–17
4	11:24	AFA	Matthew Murla 7 Yd Run (Tevye Schuettpelz-Rohl Kick)	BSU 35–24
4	11:13	BSU	Avery Williams 88 Yd Kickoff Return (Jonah Dalmas Kick)	BSU 42–24
4	7:24	AFA	Jack Sears 1 Yd Run (Jonah Dalmas Kick)	BSU 49–24
4	2:04	BSU	Bo Gross 5 Yd Run (Two-Point Run Conversion Failed)	BSU 49–30

Uniform Combination
Helmet	Jersey	Pants

- Passing leaders: Jack Sears (BSU): 17–20, 280 YDS, 3 TD; Warren Bryan (AF): 3–6, 38 YDS.
- Rushing leaders: Andrew Van Buren (BSU): 12 CAR, 70 YDS, 2 TD; Brandon Lewis (AF): 10 CAR, 112 YDS, 1 TD.
- Receiving leaders: CT Thomas (BSU): 2 REC, 101 YDS, 2 TD; Kyle Patterson (AF): 3 REC, 38 YDS.

Statistics	Boise State	Air Force
First downs	23	28
Plays–yards	49–459	73–484
Rushes–yards	29–179	66–415
Passing yards	280	69
Passing: comp–att–int	17–20–0	4–7–0
Turnovers		
Time of possession	22:29	37:31

=== BYU ===
BYU at Boise State

Team	1	2	3	4	Total
• No. 9 Cougars	7	9	22	13	51
No. 21 Broncos	3	0	0	14	17

- Date: November 6, 2020
- Location: Albertsons Stadium
  Boise, ID
- Game start: 7:45 p.m. MST
- Elapsed time: 3:21
- Game attendance: 1,100
- Game weather: 52 °F (11 °C) • Weather: Fair • Wind: 11 MPH WNW
- Referee: David Alvarez • Umpire: Stuart Schake • Linesman: Rick Smith • Line judge: Mark Estermyer • Back judge: Terrance Jones • Field judge: Jason Ledet • Side judge: Corey Luxner • Center judge: Kenneth Ray
- TV announcers (FS1): Aaron Goldsmith and Petros Papadakis

Scoring summary
1	11:24	BYU	Tyler Allgeier 86 Yd Run (Jake Oldroyd Kick)	BYU 7–0
1	3:27	BSU	Jonah Dalmas 39 Yd Field Goal	BYU 7–3
2	14:54	BYU	Jake Oldroyd 47 Yd Field Goal	BYU 10–3
2	1:00	BYU	Zach Wilson 4 Yd Run (Jake Oldroyd PAT blocked)	BYU 16–3
3	12:48	BYU	Isaac Rex 5 Yd pass from Zach Wilson (Jake Oldroyd Kick)	BYU 23–3
3	6:57	BYU	Isaac Rex 20 Yd pass from Zach Wilson (Zach Wilson Pass to Neil Pau'u for Two-Point Conversion)	BYU 31–3
3	1:26	BYU	Lopini Katoa 20 Yd Run (Jake Oldroyd Kick)	BYU 38–3
4	11:27	BYU	Neil Pau'u 1 Yd Run (Jake Oldroyd Kick)	BYU 45–3
4	9:27	BSU	Khalil Shakir 52 Yd pass from Cade Fennegan (Jonah Dalmas Kick)	BYU 45–10
4	9:07	BSU	Khalil Shakir 46 Yd pass from Cade Fennegan (Jonah Dalmas Kick)	BYU 45–17
4	7:59	BYU	Tyler Allgeier 2 Yd Run (Jake Oldroyd PAT failed)	BYU 51–17

Uniform Combination
Helmet	Jersey	Pants

- Passing leaders: Cade Fennegan (BSU): 15–26, 182 YDS, 2 TD, 1 INT; Zach Wilson (BYU): 21–27, 359 YDS, 2 TD.
- Rushing leaders: Andrew Van Buren (BSU): 16 CAR, 45 YDS; Tyler Allgeier (BYU): 14 CAR, 123 YDS, 2 TD.
- Receiving leaders: Khalil Shakir (BSU): 10 REC, 139 YDS, 2 TD; Gunner Romney (BYU): 6 REC, 133 YDS.

Statistics	BYU	Boise State
First downs	25	14
Plays–yards	68–573	65–310
Rushes–yards	38–214	27–61
Passing yards	359	249
Passing: comp–att–int	21–27–0	23–38–1
Turnovers		
Time of possession	26:47	33:13

=== Colorado State ===
Colorado State at Boise State

Team	1	2	3	4	Total
Rams	0	7	14	0	21
• Broncos	21	21	10	0	52

- Date: November 12, 2020
- Location: Albertsons Stadium
  Boise, ID
- Game start: 6:00 p.m. MST
- Elapsed time: 3:27
- Game attendance: 1,100
- Game weather: 39 °F (4 °C) • Weather: Mostly Cloudy • Wind: 9 MPH E
- Referee: Timothy Davis • Umpire: Rico Orsot • Linesman: Eric Carmouche • Line judge: J Weatherford • Back judge: Robert Lewis • Field judge: Brian Wirfel • Side judge: Keith Claiborne
- TV announcers (FS1): Alex Faust, Evan Moore

Scoring summary
1	14:08	BSU	Punt blocked by Avery Williams, recovered by Avery Williams for a TD (Jonah Dalmas Kick)	BSU 0–7
1	6:06	BSU	Riley Smith 5 Yd pass from Hank Bachmeier (Jonah Dalmas Kick)	BSU 0–14
1	1:14	BSU	Field Goal blocked, Kekaula Kaniho return for 91 Yds (Jonah Dalmas Kick)	BSU 0–21
2	13:40	CSU	Patrick O'Brien 1 Yd Run (Robert Liss Kick)	BSU 7–21
2	9:12	BSU	Andrew Van Buren 1 Yd Run (Jonah Dalmas Kick)	BSU 7–28
2	3:48	BSU	Andrew Van Buren 1 Yd Run (Jonah Dalmas Kick)	BSU 7–35
2	1:23	BSU	Punt blocked by Avery Williams, recovered by DJ Schramm for a 20 Yd return TD (Jonah Dalmas Kick)	BSU 7–42
3	11:01	CSU	Trey McBride 21 Yd pass from Todd Centeio (Robert Liss Kick)	BSU 14–42
3	10:44	CSU	A'Jon Vivens 17 Yd run (Robert Liss Kick)	BSU 21–42
3	8:52	BSU	Jonah Dalmas 38 Yd Field Goal	BSU 21–45
3	5:21	BSU	Kahlil Shakir 16 Yd pass from Hank Bachmeier, fumbled at goaline, recovered by Nick Crabtree in endzone (Jonah Dalmas Kick)	BSU 21–52

Uniform Combination
Helmet	Jersey	Pants

- Passing leaders: Hank Bachmeier (BSU): 16–28, 202 YDS, 1 TD; Patrick O'Brien (CSU): 9–20, 140 YDS, 1 INT.
- Rushing leaders: Andrew Van Buren (BSU): 13 CAR, 28 YDS, 2 TD; A'Jon Vivens (CSU): 12 CAR, 76 YDS, 1 TD.
- Receiving leaders: CT Thomas (BSU): 6 REC, 103 YDS; Dante Wright (CSU): 5 REC, 109 YDS.

Statistics	Colorado State	Boise State
First downs	15	15
Plays–yards	70–315	67–291
Rushes–yards	139	89
Passing yards	176	202
Passing: comp–att–int	11–29–1	16–30–0
Turnovers		
Time of possession	27:27	32:33

=== At Hawaii ===
Boise State at Hawaii

Team	1	2	3	4	Total
• Broncos	3	16	21	0	40
Rainbow Warriors	3	0	14	15	32

- Date: November 21, 2020
- Location: Aloha Stadium
  Honolulu, HI
- Game start: 9:00 p.m. MST
- Elapsed time: 3:46
- Game attendance: 0
- Game weather: 81 °F (27 °C) • Weather: Sunny • Wind: 21 MPH E
- Referee: Mike Cuttone • Umpire: Mark Wagner • Linesman: Justin Gragg • Line judge: Carlos Owens • Back judge: M. Aaronian • Field judge: Michael Defee • Side judge: T. Castleberry
- TV announcers (CBSSN): John Sadak, Randy Cross

Scoring summary
1	4:36	HAW	Matthew Shipley 27 Yd Field Goal	HAW 0–3
1	1:13	BSU	Jonah Dalmas 32 Yd Field Goal	TIE 3–3
2	10:09	BSU	Jonah Dalmas 42 Yd Field Goal	BSU 6–3
2	5:12	BSU	Khalil Shakir 38 Yd pass from Hank Bachmeier (Jonah Dalmas PAT blocked)	BSU 12–3
2	0:54	BSU	Khalil Shakir 3 Yd pass from CT Thomas (Jonah Dalmas Kick)	BSU 19–3
3	11:09	HAW	Calvin Turner 1 Yd Run (Two-Point Run Conversion Failed)	BSU 19–9
3	10:54	BSU	Avery Williams 99 Yd Kickoff Return (Jonah Dalmas Kick)	BSU 26–9
3	8:18	BSU	Andrew Van Buren 11 Yd Run (Jonah Dalmas Kick)	BSU 33–9
3	5:36	HAW	Calvin Turner 36 Yd pass from Chevan Cordeiro (Calvin Turner Run for Two-Point Conversion)	BSU 33–17
3	3:38	BSU	Andrew Van Buren 11 Yd Run (Jonah Dalmas Kick)	BSU 40–17
4	9:56	HAW	Calvin Turner 15 Yd pass from Chevan Cordeiro (Matthew Shipley Kick)	BSU 40–24
4	4:52	HAW	Jared Smart 4 Yd pass from Chevan Cordeiro (Calvin Turner Run for Two-Point Conversion)	BSU 40–32

Uniform Combination
Helmet	Jersey	Pants

- Passing leaders: Hank Bachmeier (BSU): 21–31, 278 YDS, 1 TD, 1 INT; Chevan Cordeiro (HAW): 25–48, 253 YDS, 3 TD.
- Rushing leaders: Andrew Van Buren (BSU): 27 CAR, 113 YDS, 2 TD; Chevan Cordeiro (HAW): 18 CAR, 90 YDS.
- Receiving leaders: Khalil Shakir (BSU): 11 REC, 130 YDS, 2 TD; Miles Reed (HAW): 6 REC, 69 YDS.

Statistics	Boise State	Hawaii
First downs	21	25
Plays–yards	68–408	83–394
Rushes–yards	36–127	35–141
Passing yards	281	253
Passing: comp–att–int	22–32–1	25–48–0
Turnovers		
Time of possession	29:20	30:40

=== At Wyoming ===
Boise State at Wyoming

Team	1	2	3	4	Total
• Broncos	7	3	7	0	17
Cowboys	3	0	3	3	9

- Date: December 12, 2020
- Location: War Memorial Stadium
  Laramie, WY
- Game start: 4:00 p.m. MST
- Elapsed time: 3:19
- Game attendance: 2,978
- Game weather: 20 °F (−7 °C) • Weather: Snowing
- Referee: Cal McNeill • Umpire: David Williams • Linesman: George Shoup • Line judge: Steve Hoslett • Back judge: Al Moore • Field judge: Albert Bryant • Side judge: Tom Bessant
- TV announcers (CBSSN): Rich Waltz, Aaron Murray, AJ Ross

Scoring summary
1	11:03	WYO	John Hoyland 42 Yd Field Goal	WYO 0–3
1	4:41	BSU	George Holani 4 Yd pass from Hank Bachmeier (Jonah Dalmas Kick)	BSU 7–3
2	7:38	BSU	Jonah Dalmas 34 Yd Field Goal	BSU 10–3
3	6:19	WYO	John Hoyland 36 Yd Field Goal	BSU 10–6
3	0:57	BSU	Andrew Van Buren 2 Yd Run (Jonah Dalmas Kick)	BSU 17–6
4	4:30	WYO	John Hoyland 36 Yd Field Goal	BSU 17–9

Uniform Combination
Helmet	Jersey	Pants

- Passing leaders: Hank Bachmeier (BSU): 19–28, 181 YDS, 1 TD, 1 INT; Levi Williams (WYO): 3–13, 45 YDS.
- Rushing leaders: Andrew Van Buren (BSU): 25 CAR, 79 YDS, 1 TD; Xazavian Valladay (WYO): 11 CAR, 59 YDS.
- Receiving leaders: Khalil Shakir (BSU): 8 REC, 105 YDS; Xazavian Valladay (WYO): 1 REC, 29 YDS.

Statistics	Boise State	Wyoming
First downs	17	9
Plays–yards	70–292	59–146
Rushes–yards	41–111	38–82
Passing yards	181	64
Passing: comp–att–int	19–29–1	4–21–0
Turnovers		
Time of possession	33:37	26–23

=== vs San Jose State (Mountain West Championship Game) ===
Boise State vs San Jose State
(Mountain West Championship Game)

Team	1	2	3	4	Total
Broncos	3	3	7	7	20
• No. 24 Spartans	7	12	0	15	34

- Date: December 19, 2020
- Location: Sam Boyd Stadium
  Whitney, Nevada
- Game start: 2:15 p.m. MST
- Game weather: Sunny • Temperature: 56 °F (13 °C) • Wind: NE 1 mph
- Referee: Scott Campbell
- TV announcers (Fox): Tim Brando, Petros Papadakis

Uniform Combination
Helmet	Jersey	Pants

- Passing leaders: Hank Bachmeier (BSU): 20–40, 221 YDS; Nick Starkel (SJSU): 32–52, 453 YDS, 3 TD.
- Rushing leaders: Andrew Van Buren (BSU): 11 CAR, 26 YDS; Kairee Robinson (SJSU): 12 CAR, 39 YDS.
- Receiving leaders: Khalil Shakir (BSU): 6 REC, 85 YDS; Tre Walker (SJSU): 7 REC, 137 YDS, 1 TD.

Statistics	Boise State	San Jose State
First downs	14	26
Plays–yards	65–224	77–498
Rushes–yards	25–3	25–45
Passing yards	221	453
Passing: comp–att–int	20–40–0	32–52–0
Turnovers		
Time of possession	25:27	34:32

== Rankings ==
Ranking movements Legend: ██ Increase in ranking ██ Decrease in ranking — = Not ranked RV = Received votes
	Week																	
Poll	Pre	1	2	3	4	5	6	7	8	9	10	11	12	13	14	15	16	Final
AP	RV	RV*	RV	—	—	—	—	—	25	21	RV	RV	RV	RV	RV	RV	—	—
Coaches	RV	RV*	RV	—	—	RV	RV	RV	RV	23	RV	RV	RV	RV	RV	RV	RV	RV
CFP	Not released												—	—	—	—	—	Not released

== Chaplain controversy ==
Following a game against the Brigham Young University Cougars on November 6, 2020, most of the players of both teams knelt midfield at Boise's Albertsons Stadium. Images of the unusual prayer circulated on social media and the story was covered by Deseret News who reported that the prayer was led by Boise State's team chaplain Pastor Mark Thornton. "We started with prayer, we're going to end with prayer, and we're going to give the glory to God," said Thornton. The chaplain had regularly lead prayer on the field after games and held chapel the night before.

The story of Boise State, a public university, having an official team chaplain organizing religious services drew the attention of the Freedom From Religion Foundation (FFRF). The foundation sent a letter to Boise State President Marlene Tromp stating that employing a chaplain was a constitutional violation and that it could make some student athletes feel coerced into prayers against their wishes. FFRF Staff Attorney Christopher Line explained, "Government chaplains may only exist as an accommodation of a public employee’s religious beliefs when the government makes it difficult or impossible to seek out private ministries...Boise State football players have no government-imposed burden on their religion, so there is no need — or legitimate legal reason — for Boise State to provide a chaplain for them."

Boise State responded by eliminating the official chaplain position and pledged to take measures to "resolve the issue and establish appropriate constitutional boundaries." President Tromp emphasized the importance of students' rights to make their own choices about their spiritual lives, telling Deseret News, "Boise State will always support our students’ right to pray, should they wish to do so. As a public institution, we cannot sponsor or endorse a specific religious advisor."

The Becket Fund for Religious Liberty, a non-profit law firm promoting religious accommodationism, criticized the FFRF after Boise State's pledge to reform. Becket Fund vice president Luke Goodrich called the FFRF "bullies" and erroneously claimed that it had forced a Kansas middle school to end their Christmas toy drive. "Many public universities have team chaplains, and it’s not only constitutional but good to accommodate players’ voluntary religious practices in this way," said Goodrich.

== Players drafted into the NFL ==
Round	Pick	Player	Position	NFL Club
4	124	John Bates	TE	Washington Football Team
5	183	Avery Williams	CB	Atlanta Falcons
