= Bernard Soriano =

American deputy director (born 1962)

- Born: October 16, 1962 (age 64)

Bernard Soriano (born October 16, 1962) is a deputy director for the California Department of Motor Vehicles. Soriano served as the chief information officer (CIO) for the California Secretary of State and also as the technology head for California Governor Arnold Schwarzenegger's California Performance Review. In 2004, he was named one of the 50 most influential individuals in technology by Silicon.com, along with Apple's Steve Jobs, Microsoft's Bill Gates, and Google's Eric Schmidt. The readers voted him the 3rd most influential person behind Jobs (#1) and Linus Torvalds (#2), and ahead of Gates (#5).

== Life and career ==
=== Early life and education ===
Soriano was born and raised on the Hawaiian island of Kauaʻi. The oldest of three children of Pedro and Juana Soriano, he attended Immaculate Conception School and Kauaʻi High and Intermediate School in Lihu'e. While attending Kauaʻi High, Soriano was very active in student government and athletics, competing in football and in track and field. He was a member of the varsity track and field team and qualified for the state championship in the 100m and 200m dash in each of his four years of high school. He was a member of the varsity football team for three years, and the team won the KIF championship. Soriano was a defensive back and was named to the all-KIF team. Soriano earned eight varsity letters and in his senior year was named the school's scholar-athlete and received the Governor John A. Burns memorial scholarship.

Soriano attended the University of California, Davis and graduated in 1985 with a double major in mechanical engineering and aeronautical engineering. While attending U.C. Davis, he was a member of the school's varsity football team for four years. Notable teammates include Ken O’Brien, Bo Eason, Dan Hawkins, and Mike Wise.

Soriano earned graduate degrees from the University of Southern California (M.S. in mechanical engineering), the California State University, Sacramento (M.B.A. in finance), and the University of California, Irvine (Ph.D. in engineering).

=== Professional life ===
Soriano first worked for Hughes Aircraft Company, later known as Hughes Space and Communications Company, starting in 1985. He was involved in the design and analysis of satellite attitude control systems.

In 1994, Soriano was selected by NASA as an astronaut candidate finalist. Notable individuals from the group include Rick Husband, William McCool, and Stephen Robinson.

Also in 1994, Soriano was hired by the United States Golf Association (USGA) to be the assistant technical director for the Research and Test Center.

Soriano was appointed by California governor Pete Wilson to be the chief technology officer for the California Department of Forestry and Fire Protection in 1997. Two years later, California secretary of state Bill Jones appointed Soriano to be the office's chief information officer.

In 2004, California governor Arnold Schwarzenegger named Soriano to be the technology lead for the California Performance Review.
