= Tamie Tsuchiyama =

Asian American librarian

Tsuchiyama in 1946

Tamie Tsuchiyama (8 May 1915 – 12 May 1984), a Nisei woman, was the only Japanese-American to work full time for the Japanese-American Evacuation and Resettlement Study. She kept a wide-range sociological journal and ethnographic reports while she was in Poston War Relocation Center. In 1947, she worked with the U.S. government overseas operation that was run by the Supreme Commander for the Allied Powers (SCAP) as a researcher. Due to the stress from gathering information, Tsuchiyama resigned in July 1944, and sought to join the Women's Army Auxiliary Corps (WAAC). Since she knew German, French and Spanish, she was assigned to Japanese language school and military intelligence assignment translating official Japanese documents.

== Early life ==
Tsuchiyama was the youngest of three children born to Issei immigrant parents in Hawaii. She lived near the town of Lihue on the island of Kauaʻi, in the then Territory of Hawaii. She was academically oriented and succeeded in school even though she was a somewhat sickly child. She graduated from Lihue Grammar School in 1930, and then attended Kauai High School on the academic track, studying math, science, French, and Spanish. She graduated in 1933.

She attended University of Hawaii, where she discovered her passion for anthropology after studying with Felix M. Keesing, who encouraged her to attend UCLA. She enrolled in 1936 and worked with Ralph Beals. However, Beals was new there, Tsuchiyama transferred to UC, Berkeley which had the most largest and established program in the fall of 1937) and graduated with honors for her B.A.

During World War II, following the signing of Executive Order 9066, she was forcibly interned at the Poston War Relocation Center in Arizona.

== After the War ==
After the war, Tsuchiyama returned to Berkeley between 1946 and 1947 to finish her Ph.D. Tsuchiyama became the first Japanese-American woman to complete a doctorate in anthropology at Berkeley. She had a hard time finding a job and returned to school for a bachelors of library science degree. She then worked as a director of the Oriental Library at the University of Texas until she retired around the mid-1970s. Tsuchiyama died on May 12, 1984, in Austin, Texas.
