= Morioka (surname) =

Morioka (written: 森岡 or 守岡) is a Japanese surname. Notable people with the surname include:

- Eiji Morioka (森岡 栄治, 1946–2004), Japanese boxer
- Hatsuko Morioka (守岡 初子, born 1915), Japanese swimmer
- Hiroshi Morioka (守岡 博), Japanese anime director and artist
- Hiroyuki Morioka (森岡 浩之, born 1962), Japanese writer
- Kaoru Morioka (森岡 薫, born 1979), Peruvian-born Japanese futsal player
- Ken Morioka (森岡 賢, 1967–2016), Japanese musician
- Kōichirō Morioka (森岡 紘一朗, born 1985), Japanese racewalker
- Masahiro Morioka (森岡 正博, born 1958), Japanese philosopher
- Masahiro Morioka (politician) (森岡 正宏), Japanese politician
- Ted Morioka, American politician
- Ryuzo Morioka (森岡 隆三, born 1975), Japanese footballer
- Ryosuke Morioka (森岡 良介, born 1984), Japanese baseball player
- Ryota Morioka (森岡 亮太, born 1991), Japanese footballer
- Shigeru Morioka (森岡 茂, born 1973), Japanese footballer
- Zak Morioka (born 1978), Brazilian racing driver
