= Kauai High School =

Public high school in Hawaii, United States

Coordinates: 21.95907°N 159.35997°W

Location
- 3577 Lala Road; Lihue, Hawaii 96766

Information
- School type: Public, Comprehensive high school
- Established: September 14, 1914
- School district: Hawaii School District
- Oversight: Western Association of Schools and Colleges, Accrediting Commission for Schools
- Principal: Marlene Leary
- Staff: 70.00 (FTE)
- Grades: 9–12
- Enrollment: 1,108 (2022–2023)
- Student to teacher ratio: 15.83
- Language: English
- Campus: Suburban
- Area: Līhuʻe, Hawaii
- Colors: Red and White
- Athletics conference: Kauai Interscholastic Federation (KIF)
- Mascot: Eagle
- Team name: Red Raiders
- Rivals: Waimea High School, Kapaʻa High School
- Communities served: Līhuʻe, Kōloa, Kalāheo, Hanamāʻulu
- Feeder schools: Hawaii School District
- Website: Official Website

Kauai High School is a public high school in Līhuʻe, Hawaii. It is named after the island of Kauaʻi and is part of the Hawaii Department of Education.

Kauai High School serves students from ninth through twelfth grades. It was the first public high school on Kauaʻi and has a rich history, a wide variety of programs, and many notable alumni. It began operating in 1914 and graduated its first class, consisting of one out of seven students, in 1919. Since then, the school has grown each year with an increasing number of students.

== History ==
The hill above Nāwiliwili was called Ke Kuhiau ("high point"), and was one of three heiau near Kalapakī Bay. Governor Paul Kanoa's residence stood there before annexation, and later it became the courthouse and county offices. When new county buildings were built on Rice Street, Kauaʻi High School was established atop the hill.

Kauaʻi High School was founded in 1914. On April 30, 1913, the governor of the Territory of Hawaii signed into law Act 160 to establish "the Kauai High School". On September 14, 1914, Kauaʻi High School opened in the renovated courthouse as the fifth high school of the Territory of Hawaii and the first high school on Kauaʻi.

The securing of this site and plant for a high school was brought about mainly by the efforts of the parents who had been supporting the private school in the Lihue Union Church yard. The school was organized as a public institution, making it available to all eligible students in the county. In addition, the old private school was affiliated with the high school and partly maintained by tuition fees; hence the name Kauai High and Grammar School.

When Kauaʻi High School opened in 1914, it was a little over a month after the outbreak of World War I. There were seven in attendance that year. Only one of these remained to graduate. The next year seven more entered. For each of the following three years, about twice that number enrolled. In 1919, 29 entered. Seven students graduated in 1919; numbers climbed to about 100 per class in the 1930s. During the '20s and '30s, some students lived in private dormitories, bungalows were built as classes were added, sports were introduced, and there were student dances and theatrical performances. The original school building was torn down in 1931, and the gym (still in use today) was built in 1939.

The '60s was a time when students were encouraged to "do your own thing", and Kauaʻi High was a part of that approach to life. Kauaʻi High School added numerous clubs, including the National Thespian Society, Explorer Post, and Y-Club. The school had about 190 seniors in the '60s. As the '70s rolled in, the school's senior class grew to 249 students, and more clubs, activities, sports and classes were added. A homemade dynamite bomb was found in the "K" building boys' restroom and defused. The old "A" building was torn down, and there were plans to build a new, two-story, 12-classroom building. In the 1970s the cafeteria, library, administration building, "K" building, and swimming pool were built.

Kauaʻi High greeted the '80s after a statewide six-week strike that left classrooms uncleaned, lunches unprepared and, later, the school unopened. The decade also started with the construction of "A" building; the 11-classroom building housed new classrooms designed for science, business, and home economics.

In 1998 the six-period day was abandoned in favor of block scheduling, and in 2000 the intermediate grades went to Chiefess Kamakahelei Middle School. Since then there has been no new construction, but in 2003 the campus was given a facelift.

On March 1, 2021, a groundbreaking ceremony was held at Kaua‘i High School for a new gymnasium, nicknamed "The Roost". The $21 million project was conceived in 2011, with the help of John Hara Associates, Inc., and completed in 2023. The new gymnasium holds 1,600 spectators, approximately twice the number the old gym held.

== Campus ==
The campus sits on about four acres off Lala Road and has sweeping views of Kalapakī Bay and Nāwiliwili Harbor. Among the facilities are an athletic field, gym, and swimming pool.

Also on campus are the bronze sculpture Reflections by Bumpei Akaji, the resin relief mural The Struggle by Joseph Hadley, the ceramic fountain Ka Hoʻo Mau by Wayne Miyata, and the mixed media sculpture Kauai Ola by Ken Shutt.

== Co-curricular and extracurricular activities ==
=== Sports ===
The Kauaʻi High School Red Raiders are members of the Kauai Interscholastic Federation (KIF) and compete in the following sports:

Boys Sports	Girls Sports
Air Riflery	Air Riflery
Basketball	Basketball
Bowling	Bowling
Baseball	Canoe Paddling
Canoe Paddling	Cross Country
Cross Country	Golf
Football	Soccer
Golf	Softball
Soccer	Swimming
Swimming	Tennis
Tennis	Track and Field
Track and Field	Volleyball
Volleyball	Wrestling
Wrestling

=== HHSAA Championships ===
- 2024 Boys Air Riflery
- 2017 Baseball (Division II)
- 2011 Baseball (Division II)
- 2009 Softball (Division II)
- 2008 Baseball (Division II)
- 2005 Boys Golf
- 2004 Boys Golf
- 2004 Girls Golf
- 2001 Girls Golf
- 1995 Boys Bowling
- 1989 Boys Golf
- 1981 Boys Bowling
- 1979 Boys Golf
- 1978 Boys Bowling
- 1958 Girls Tennis

=== Mock trial ===
In 2005, the school's mock trial team finished second in the National High School Mock Trial Championship in Charlotte, North Carolina. In 2012, the team traveled to New York to compete in the international competition, Empire Mock Trial. It was coached by Aric Fujii and Ted Chihara.

== Notable alumni ==
Listed alphabetically by last name:

- Sonya Balmores (2004), Miss Teen USA runner-up (2004), actress, model
- Luke Evslin (2003), member of the Hawaii House of Representatives
- David Ishii (1973), professional golfer
- Dain Kane (1980) University of Hawaiʻi swimming team member, politician, Maui County council member
- Derek Kawakami (1996), Mayor of Kauai
- David Kuraoka (1964), ceramic artist
- Spark Matsunaga (1934), U.S. representative and U.S. senator
- Glenn Medeiros (1988), recording artist, Saint Louis School president
- Ted Morioka, member of the Hawaii House of Representatives
- Val Okimoto, member of the Honolulu City Council and former member of the Hawaii House of Representatives
- Cov Ratcliffe, member of the Hawaii House of Representatives
- Eric Shinseki (1960), U.S. Army 4-star general, Joint Chiefs of Staff, Army Chief of Staff, U.S. Secretary of Veterans Affairs
- Micah W. J. Smith (1999), judge, U.S. District Court for the District of Hawaii
- Micah Solusod (2008), voice actor and artist
- Bernard Soriano (1980), college football player, NASA astronaut finalist, California state government official
- Tamie Tsuchiyama, (1933), anthropologist
- Guy Yamamoto (1979), golfer
- Kirby Yates (2005), Major League Baseball player
- Tyler Yates (1995), Major League Baseball player
- JoAnn Yukimura (1967), Mayor of Kauai
