= Dain Kane =

American politician (born 1962)

Dain Kane (born June 6, 1962) is a politician from the state of Hawaii, United States. Kane was elected as a councilman in Maui County for four consecutive terms. He served as the Council chairman for two years and the Budget and Finance chairman.

== Early life and education ==
Kane was born and raised on the Hawaiian island of Kauai. He attended Kamehameha Schools on Oahu as well as Wilcox Elementary School and Kauai High and Intermediate School in Lihue. While attending Kauai High, Kane was very active in athletics, competing in football and in swimming. He was a member of the varsity swim team and qualified for the state championship in the 50m and 100m freestyle events. He was a member of the varsity football team that won the KIF championship. Kane was named to the all-KIF team.

Kane attended the University of Hawaiʻi and graduated in 1985 with a bachelor's degree in secondary education and a minor in geography. While at the University of University of Hawaiʻi, Kane was a member of the varsity swim team.

== Professional life ==
Kane was first elected into office in January 1999 and served on the Maui County council for four consecutive terms. He represented the Wailuku-Waihee-Waikapu residency area and held office until December 2006.

During his tenure in office, Kane served as Chair of the Council, Vice-Chair of the Council, Chair of the Committee of the Whole, and Chair of the Budget and Finance Committee. As Chair of the Budget and Finance Committee, Councilmember Kane introduced legislation to provide tax relief for middle-income homeowners by increasing the homeowner exemption and proposing a decrease in the tax rate for homeowners.

Also while in office, Kane served as the Maui County Council Representative on the Hawaii State Association of Counties (HSAC), serving as its Secretary from January 2001 through June 2002, Vice-President from July 2002 through June 2003, and President from July 2003 through June 2006.

== Personal life ==
Kane lives in Maui with his wife and kids.
