= Ted Morioka =

American politician (1921–1992)

Member of the Hawaii House of Representatives
- In office 1963–???

Personal details
- Born: Ted Tadao Morioka; November 18, 1921 Honolulu, Hawaii, U.S.
- Died: April 17, 1992 (aged 70)
- Party: Democratic
- Spouse: Alice Umeko
- Children: 2

Ted Tadao Morioka (November 18, 1921 – April 17, 1992) was an American politician. He served as a Democratic member of the Hawaii House of Representatives.

== Life and career ==
Morioka was born in Honolulu, Hawaii. He attended Kauai High School.

In 1963, Morioka was elected to the Hawaii House of Representatives. He was an assistant majority floor leader in the 1970s.

Morioka died April 1992, at the age of 70.
