= Rich Miano =

American football player and coach (born 1962)

No. 36, 38
- Position: Safety

Personal information
- Born: September 3, 1962 (age 64); Newton, Massachusetts, U.S.
- Listed height: 6 ft 1 in (1.85 m)
- Listed weight: 200 lb (91 kg)

Career information
- High school: Kaiser (HI)
- College: Hawaii
- NFL draft: 1985: 6th round, 166th overall pick

Career history

Playing
- New York Jets (1985–1989); Philadelphia Eagles (1991–1994); Atlanta Falcons (1995)

Coaching
- Hawaii (1999–2007) Secondary coach; Hawaii (2008–2011) Associate head coach & secondary coach; Kaiser High School (HI) (2012–2013) Head coach

Career NFL statistics
- Total tackles: 526
- Sacks: 0.5
- Interceptions: 15
- Forced fumbles: 3
- Fumble recoveries: 3
- Stats at Pro Football Reference

Head coaching record
- Career: High school: 20–4 (.833)

Richard James Miano (born September 3, 1962) is an American former professional football player who was a defensive back for 10 seasons with three teams in the National Football League (NFL). He played college football for the Hawaii Rainbow Warriors. He has served as executive director of the Hula Bowl, a college football all-star game, since it was revived in 2020.

== Biography ==
At the University of Hawaiʻi at Mānoa, Miano was a walk-on for the Rainbow Warriors in 1981, and became an all-Western Athletic Conference defensive back in 1983 and 1984. Miano was selected in the sixth round of the 1985 NFL draft by the New York Jets, where he played five seasons. After missing the entire 1990 season with a knee injury, Miano went to the Philadelphia Eagles where he played four seasons. In 1995, his final season in the NFL, he played for the Atlanta Falcons.

After his retirement from the NFL, Miano moved back to his home in Honolulu, Hawaii, where he became an associate coach with the Hawaii Rainbow Warriors. After head coach Greg McMackin resigned from Hawaii in 2011, Miano became head coach for the Henry J. Kaiser High School team. There, Miano's team won an HHSAA championship in 2013 with a 12–1 record.

In July 2014, Miano was hired as a color analyst for Hawaii football games broadcast on OC Sports.

Miano and his wife, Lori, have two children.

=== Head coaching record ===
Miano accrued a 20–4 record in two seasons as head coach of the Kaiser Cougars, including leading them to a state championship in 2013, when the team defeated Kauai in the D-II final, 17–7.

Year	Team	Overall	Conference	Standing	Bowl/playoffs
Kaiser Cougars (Oahu Interscholastic Association) (2012–2013)
2012	Kaiser	7–3	7–1	3rd	L OIA White Semi-Final
2013	Kaiser	13–1	8–0	1st	W D-II Final
Kaiser:		20–4			
Total:		20–4			
National championship Conference title Conference division title or championship game berth
