= Jacob Yoro =

American football coach (born 1979)

Current position
- Title: Safeties coach
- Team: Missouri
- Conference: SEC

Biographical details
- Born: December 8, 1979 (age 46); Honolulu, Hawaii, U.S.
- Education: Hawaiʻi (2008)

Playing career
- 1998–2001: Montana
- Position: Linebacker

Coaching career (HC unless noted)
- 2002: Mililani HS (HI) (LB)
- 2003–2004: Saint Louis School (HI) (LB)
- 2005–2007: Saint Louis School (HI) (DC/LB)
- 2008: Waipahu HS (HI) (LB)
- 2009: Montana Western (LB)
- 2010: Pacific (OR) (DC/LB)
- 2011–2013: Pacific (OR) (DC/LB/RC)
- 2014: Pacific (OR) (AHC/DC/LB/RC)
- 2015–2016: Cal Poly (DB)
- 2017: Hawaii (S)
- 2018: Hawaii (OLB/NB)
- 2019: Hawaii (OLB)
- 2020: Hawaii (co-DC/LB)
- 2021: Hawaii (LB)
- 2022: Hawaii (DC/OLB)
- 2023: Hawaii (DC/S)
- 2024–present: Missouri (S)

Jacob Yoro (born December 8, 1979) is an American football coach who is currently the safeties coach at the University of Missouri.

== Coaching career ==
After his playing career ended due to injury, Yoro began coaching at the high school level in Hawaii. He spent 2002 as the linebackers coach at Mililani High School before joining the coaching staff at his alma mater Saint Louis School in 2003 as their linebackers coach. He also spent time coaching at Waipahu High School in 2008 while working at the Pearl Harbor Naval Shipyard.

Upon the completion of his degree in 2008, Yoro went to work in the college ranks, joining the coaching staff at Montana Western as their linebackers coach. While at Montana Western, he lived in the basement of the defensive coordinator's house, sleeping on an air mattress.

Yoro was hired to be the defensive coordinator and linebackers coach at Pacific University in Oregon in 2010. He later added the title of recruiting coordinator in 2011 and assistant head coach in 2014. Yoro departed Pacific in 2015 to take an assistant coaching position at Cal Poly as their defensive backs coach.

=== Hawaii ===
Yoro was hired in 2017 by Hawaii to be their safeties coach. He was reassigned to coaching outside linebackers and nickelbacks in 2018 following the hire of Corey Batoon. He was retained by newly hired head coach Todd Graham in 2020, the first member of his inaugural staff and was promoted to co-defensive coordinator and reassigned to linebackers coach.

=== Missouri ===
Yoro was hired in early 2024 by Missouri to serve as a defensive analyst. On July 28, 2024, head coach Eliah Drinkwitz announced Yoro was promoted to safeties coach.

== Personal life ==
A native of Mililani, Hawaii, Yoro attended Saint Louis School in Honolulu, where he was an all-state linebacker. Yoro and his wife Meredith have one daughter.
