= Micah Vanterpool =

American football player (born 1999)

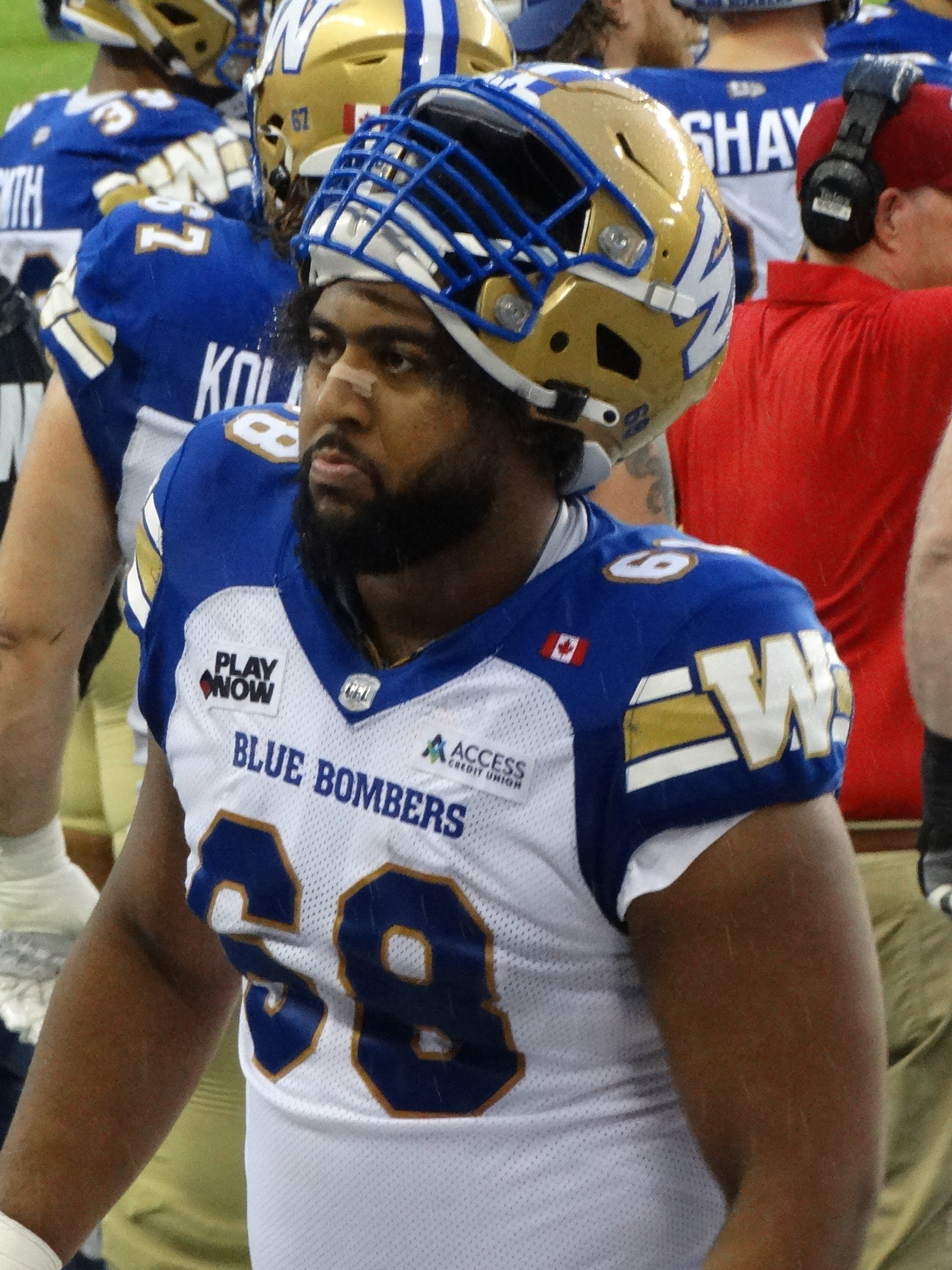
- Vanterpool with the Winnipeg Blue Bombers in 2025

No. 68 – Winnipeg Blue Bombers
- Position: Offensive lineman
- Roster status: Reserve
- CFL status: American

Personal information
- Born: January 19, 1999 (age 27); Tulsa, Oklahoma, U.S.
- Listed height: 6 ft 5 in (1.96 m)
- Listed weight: 336 lb (152 kg)

Career information
- High school: Central (Phoenix, Arizona)
- College: Hawaii (2017–2022)
- NFL draft: 2023: undrafted

Career history
- New Jersey Generals (2023); New England Patriots (2023)*; New Jersey Generals (2024)*; Winnipeg Blue Bombers (2024–present)
- * Offseason or practice squad member only

Awards and highlights
- Second-team All-Mountain West (2022)
- Stats at CFL.ca

Micah Vanterpool (born January 19, 1999) is an American professional football offensive lineman for the Winnipeg Blue Bombers of the Canadian Football League (CFL). He played college football at Hawaii.

== Early life ==
Micah Vanterpool was born on January 19, 1999, in Tulsa, Oklahoma. He played high school football at Central High School in Phoenix, Arizona. He was a starter at left tackle during both his sophomore and senior years, and missed his junior year due to injury. Vanterpool did not allow a sack in high school. He earned first-team all-state and first-team all-academic honors his senior year. He was also a three-year letterman in basketball and a two-year letterman in track. He competed in the shot put and discus on the track team. Vanterpool graduated magna cum laude from Central High in 2017.

== College career ==
Vanterpool played college football for the Hawaii Rainbow Warriors of the University of Hawaii at Manoa. He was redshirted in 2017. As a redshirt freshman in 2018, he played in nine games as a backup offensive lineman and on special teams while garnering academic all-Mountain West recognition. In 2019, Vanterpool appeared in four games as a backup offensive lineman and on special teams. Vanterpool played in all nine games during the COVID-19 shortened 2020 season and started the final five games (four at left tackle and one at right tackle). He started the first 11 games of the 2021 season at left guard before missing the final two games due to injury, only allowing two sacks all year. He was named honorable mention All-Mountain West for his performance during the 2021 season. Vanterpool started all 13 games at right guard as a sixth-year senior in 2022, garnering second-team All-Mountain West recognition. According to Pro Football Focus (PFF), Vanterpool was one of only 14 FBS offensive lineman to not allow a sack all season, in at least 500 pass blocking snaps. He was also one of only two FBS offensive lineman to not incur a penalty in at least 900 snaps. He graduated from Hawaii with degrees in sociology, human development, and family studies.

== Professional career ==
Pre-draft measurables
Height	Weight	Arm length	Hand span	Wingspan	40-yard dash	10-yard split	20-yard split	20-yard shuttle	Three-cone drill	Vertical jump	Broad jump	Bench press
6 ft 4 1/4 in (1.94 m)	305 lb (138 kg)	34 in (0.86 m)	8 3/4 in (0.22 m)	6 ft 9 1/2 in (2.07 m)	5.29 s	1.97 s	3.08 s	5.08 s	8.11 s	24.5 in (0.62 m)	8 ft 8 in (2.64 m)	16 reps
All values from Pro Day

Vanterpool went undrafted in the 2023 NFL draft. He signed with the New Jersey Generals of the United States Football League (USFL) on June 5, 2023, but was placed on the inactive list the same day and did not play in any games. He was released by the Generals on August 11, and signed by the New England Patriots the next day. Vanterpool was released by New England on August 27, 2023. He signed with the Generals again on October 31, 2023, for the 2024 USFL season.

Vanterpool was signed by the Winnipeg Blue Bombers of the Canadian Football League (CFL) on February 1, 2024. He was moved to the practice roster on June 2, promoted to the active roster on August 31, moved to the practice roster again on September 20, promoted to the active roster again on October 20, and placed on the one-game injured list on October 25, 2024. He played in two games overall for the Blue Bombers during the 2024 CFL season. He started the 2025 season opener at left guard. For the next game, Vanterpool was moved back into a reserve role in favor of Canadian Gabe Wallace due to American-Canadian ratio rules.
