= Ilm Manning =

American gridiron football player (born 1999)

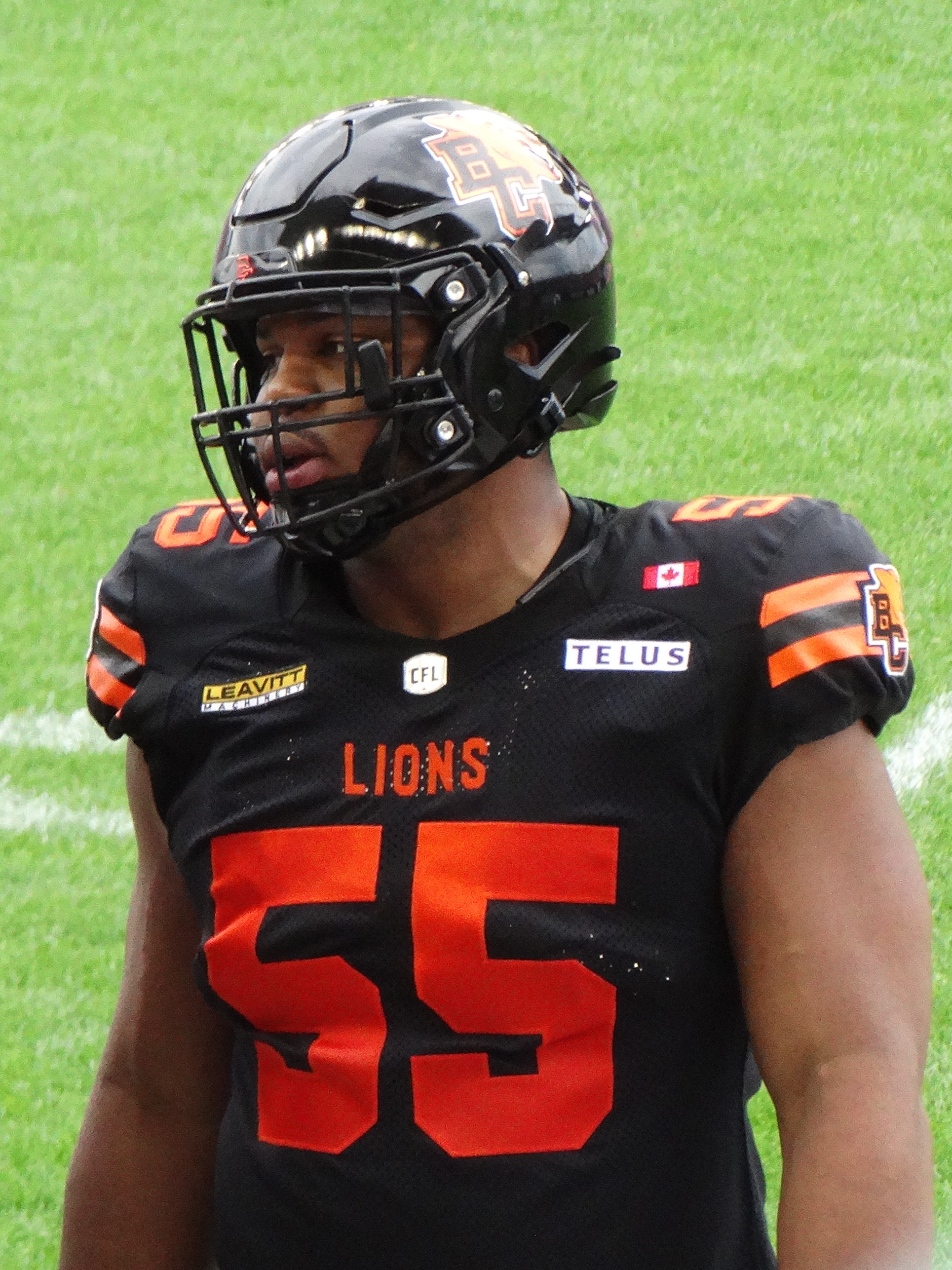
- Manning with the BC Lions in 2025

Profile
- Position: Offensive tackle

Personal information
- Born: July 23, 1999 (age 27); Glendale, Arizona, U.S.
- Listed height: 6 ft 2 in (1.88 m)
- Listed weight: 294 lb (133 kg)

Career information
- High school: Apollo (AZ)
- College: Hawaii (2018–2022)
- NFL draft: 2023: undrafted

Career history
- San Francisco 49ers (2023)*; Arizona Cardinals (2023); San Francisco 49ers (2023)*; Carolina Panthers (2023); Seattle Seahawks (2024)*; Birmingham Stallions (2025)*; BC Lions (2025); St. Louis Battlehawks (2026)*
- * Offseason or practice squad member only

Awards and highlights
- First-team All-MW (2022)
- Stats at Pro Football Reference

Ilm Manning (born July 23, 1999) is an American professional football offensive tackle. He played college football for the Hawaii Rainbow Warriors and has been a member of the San Francisco 49ers, Arizona Cardinals, Carolina Panthers, Seattle Seahawks, Birmingham Stallions, BC Lions, and St. Louis Battlehawks.

== Early life ==
Manning was born on July 23, 1999, in Glendale, Arizona. He attended Apollo High School and played football, track and field and basketball. Manning was a two-way player in football, seeing action on both sides of the line while being a two-time all-league selection and the 2017 Class 5A Metro Region Player of the Year. He committed to play college football for the Hawaii Rainbow Warriors.

== College career ==
As a true freshman in 2018, Manning started all 14 games at left tackle, being one of only four freshman to do so nationally. He started every game again in 2019 and was named second-team All-Mountain West Conference (MWC). In 2020, Manning played in seven games, five of which he started. The following year, he started all 13 games and earned honorable mention All-MWC honors, being one of four offensive players for Hawaii to start every game. He returned for a final season in 2022, after all athletes had their eligibility extended one year due to the COVID-19 pandemic. In his last year, Manning started all 13 games and was named a first-team all-conference selection, also being invited to the East–West Shrine Bowl. He finished his collegiate career having played in 62 out of 64 possible games, all at tackle.

== Professional career ==
Pre-draft measurables
| Height | Weight | Arm length | Hand span | 40-yard dash | 10-yard split | 20-yard split | 20-yard shuttle | Three-cone drill | Vertical jump | Broad jump | Bench press |
|---|---|---|---|---|---|---|---|---|---|---|---|
| 6 ft 2 1/8 in (1.88 m) | 294 lb (133 kg) | 32 5/8 in (0.83 m) | 9 3/8 in (0.24 m) | 5.00 s | 1.76 s | 2.88 s | 4.70 s | 7.93 s | 30.5 in (0.77 m) | 9 ft 2 in (2.79 m) | 25 reps |
All values from Pro Day

=== San Francisco 49ers (first stint) ===
After going unselected in the 2023 NFL draft, Manning was signed by the San Francisco 49ers as an undrafted free agent. He was waived on August 29, 2023, as part of final roster cuts.

=== Arizona Cardinals ===
On August 20, 2023, Manning was claimed off waivers by the Arizona Cardinals. He was released on October 2, having not seen any playing time during his four-game stay on the active roster.

=== San Francisco 49ers (second stint) ===
On October 4, 2023, Manning was signed to the 49ers practice squad.

=== Carolina Panthers ===
On December 28, 2023, Manning was signed by the Carolina Panthers off the 49ers practice squad. He was inactive for each game and ended the season having seen no playing time. On May 10, 2024, Manning was waived.

=== Seattle Seahawks ===
On July 24, 2024, Manning was signed by the Seattle Seahawks. He was waived on August 27 as a part of final roster cuts.

=== Birmingham Stallions ===
On December 3, 2024, Manning signed with the Birmingham Stallions of the United Football League (UFL). He was released on March 10, 2025.

=== BC Lions ===
On May 21, 2025, Manning signed with the BC Lions. On June 6, 2025, Manning was placed on the Lions' 1-game injured list as a healthy scratch to start the 2025 CFL season. On July 13, 2025, Manning was requisitioned to the Lions' active roster after their offensive line suffered multiple injuries in quick succession. He was reassigned to the practice squad on September 4, 2025. On September 18, 2025, Manning was recalled to the active roster. On September 25, 2025, Manning was once again reassigned to the practice squad, as multiple other members of the Lions' offensive line returned from their injuries simultaneously. He was released on October 1, 2025.

=== St. Louis Battlehawks ===
On January 27, 2026, Manning signed with the St. Louis Battlehawks. He was released on March 20.
