= Bradajo =

American writer

Bradajo ("Brother Joe") is the pen name of Jozuf Hadley, also known as Joe Hadley (born 1932), an American poet, sculptor, and art teacher who writes in Hawaiian Pidgin.

Chaloookyu Eensai, his 1972 recording with printed translation, is believed to be the first publication in Hawaiian Pidgin. He was born on Kauaʻi.

== Books ==
- Avebade Bade = Everybody Body : Hawaii’s Pidgin Poetry, Mutual Pub., c2002. ISBN 1-56647-568-6
- 2 Poems, Tinfish Press, c2006. ISBN 0-9759376-7-7
