= Blessman Ta'ala =

American Samoan gridiron football player (born 1999)

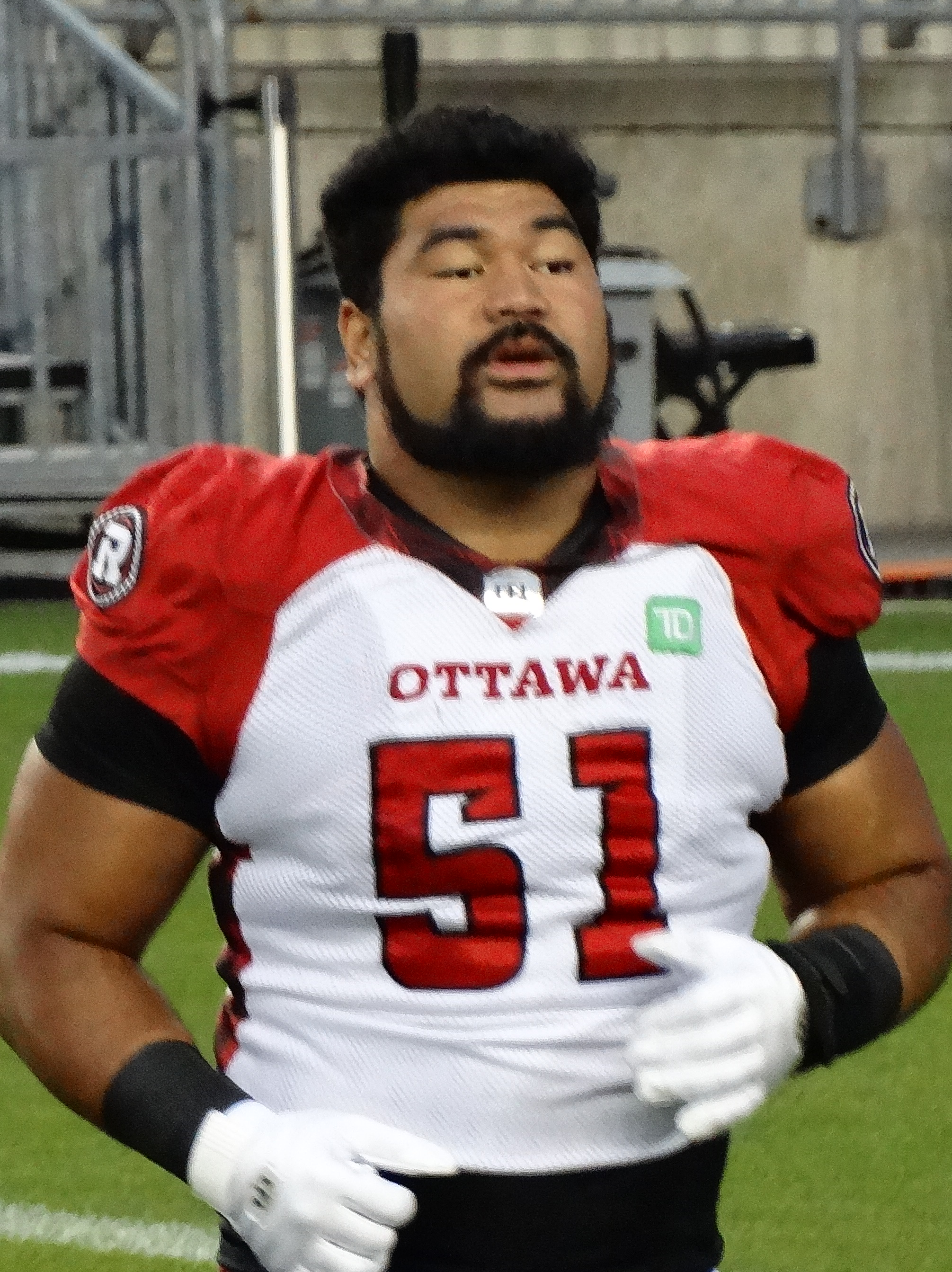
- Ta'ala with the Ottawa Redblacks in 2023

No. 51 – Ottawa Redblacks
- Position: Defensive lineman
- Roster status: Active
- CFL status: Global

Personal information
- Born: March 11, 1999 (age 27); Fagaʻitua, American Samoa
- Listed height: 6 ft 1 in (1.85 m)
- Listed weight: 290 lb (132 kg)

Career information
- High school: Faga‘itua (American Samoa)
- College: Hawaii
- CFL draft: 2023G: 1st round, 1st overall pick

Career history
- 2023–present: Ottawa Redblacks
- Stats at CFL.ca

Blessman Ta'ala (born March 11, 1999) is an American Samoan professional Canadian football defensive lineman for the Ottawa Redblacks of the Canadian Football League (CFL). He played college football at Hawaii.

== Early life ==
Ta'ala played high school football at Fagaʻitua High School in Fagaʻitua, American Samoa. He was named to the 2016 U.S. Army National Combine first team as a defensive lineman. He was rated the No. 1 overall recruit from American Samoa in the class of 2018 by 247Sports. Ta'ala also played one season of soccer in high school.

== College career ==
Ta'ala played college football at Hawaii from 2018 to 2022 as a defensive lineman.

He started 14 games in 2018, recording 32 tackles and a blocked field goal. He played in 15 games, starting 11, in 2019, totaling 19 tackles, one sack and one blocked kick, earning honorable mention all-Mountain West Conference honors. Ta'ala started nine games in the COVID-19-shortened 2020 season, recording 21 tackles and garnering honorable mention All-Mountain West recognition for the second consecutive year. He played in 13 games, starting four, in 2021, recording 30 tackles and one sack. He started 13 games in 2022, totaling 40 tackles and two sacks while also being one of four team captains. Ta'ala earned honorable mention All-Mountain West honors for the third consecutive year. He also played in a school-record 64 straight games during his five-season career.

== Professional career ==
Pre-draft measurables
Height	Weight	Arm length	Hand span	Wingspan	40-yard dash	10-yard split	20-yard split	20-yard shuttle	Three-cone drill	Vertical jump	Broad jump	Bench press
6 ft 1 in (1.85 m)	290 lb (132 kg)	31 1/8 in (0.79 m)	9 7/8 in (0.25 m)	6 ft 3 1/8 in (1.91 m)	5.13 s	1.77 s	2.94 s	5.05 s	7.86 s	29.5 in (0.75 m)	8 ft 1 in (2.46 m)	28 reps
All values from Pro Day

Ta'ala was selected by the Ottawa Redblacks of the Canadian Football League (CFL) with the first overall pick in the 2023 CFL global draft. He signed with the team on May 2, 2023. He was placed on injured reserve on July 22, 2023, and activated from injured reserve on September 7, 2023. Overall, Ta'ala dressed in 12 games, starting three, for the Redblacks in 2023, recording six tackles on defense, one special teams tackle, two sacks and one forced fumble.
