= Cam Lockridge =

American football player

Profile
- Position: Cornerback

Personal information
- Born: Tampa, Florida, U.S.
- Listed height: 5 ft 11 in (1.80 m)
- Listed weight: 181 lb (82 kg)

Career information
- High school: Thomas Richard Robinson (Tampa, Florida)
- College: Reedley (2019); Hawaii (2020–2021); Fresno State (2022–2024)
- NFL draft: 2025: undrafted

Career history
- Ottawa Redblacks (2025)

Awards and highlights
- First-team All-MW (2024)

Cameron Lockridge is an American professional football cornerback. He played college football for the Hawaii Rainbow Warriors and Fresno State Bulldogs.

== Early life ==
Lockridge attended Thomas Richard Robinson High School in Tampa, Florida, and committed to play college football at Reedley College.

== College career ==
=== Reedley ===
In one season at Reedley in 2019, Lockridge recorded four interceptions.

=== Hawaii ===
Lockridge committed to play for the Hawaii Rainbow Warriors after one season at Reedley. In two seasons at Hawaii in 2020 and 2021, he notched 73 tackles, three interceptions, and a touchdown. After the 2022 season, Lockridge entered his name into the NCAA transfer portal.

=== Fresno State ===
Lockridge transferred to play for the Fresno State Bulldogs. In his first two seasons with the Bulldogs in 2022 and 2023, he played in just 17 games due to injury where notched 51 tackles with four being for a loss, a sack, 15 pass deflections, six interceptions a fumble recovery, and a touchdown. In week 3 of the 2024 season, Lockridge recorded six tackles, two pass deflections, two interceptions, and a forced fumble, as he helped Fresno State to a win over New Mexico State.

== Professional career ==
Pre-draft measurables
Height	Weight	Arm length	Hand span	40-yard dash	10-yard split	20-yard split	20-yard shuttle	Three-cone drill	Vertical jump	Broad jump
5 ft 10 3/4 in (1.80 m)	181 lb (82 kg)	29 3/4 in (0.76 m)	9 1/8 in (0.23 m)	4.56 s	1.58 s	2.70 s	4.31 s	7.06 s	31.5 in (0.80 m)	10 ft 0 in (3.05 m)
All values from Pro Day

Lockridge was signed to the practice roster of the Ottawa Redblacks of the Canadian Football League on August 18, 2025.

On May 18, 2026, Lockridge was released by the Redblacks.
