= Penei Pavihi =

American Samoan gridiron football player (born 1999)

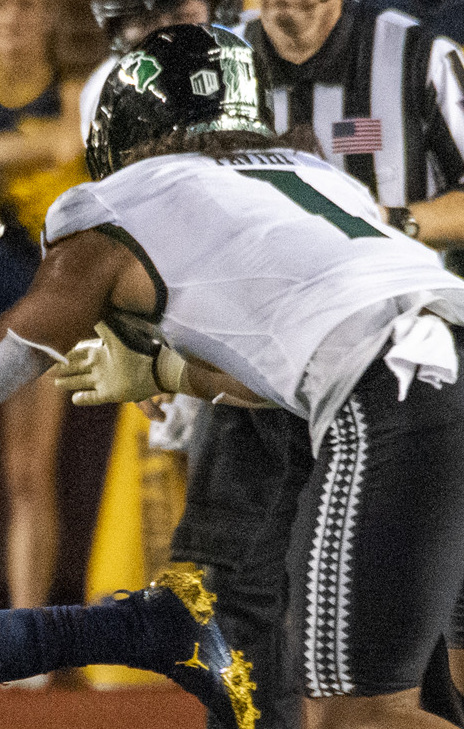
- Pavihi with Hawaii in 2022

No. 45
- Position: Linebacker

Personal information
- Born: November 21, 1999 (age 26); Pago Pago, American Samoa
- Listed height: 6 ft 3 in (1.91 m)
- Listed weight: 245 lb (111 kg)

Career information
- High school: Tafuna (American Samoa)
- College: Hawaii
- CFL draft: 2023G: 1st round, 4th overall pick

Career history
- 2023–2024: Hamilton Tiger-Cats
- Stats at CFL.ca

Penei Pavihi (born November 21, 1999) is an American Samoan former professional Canadian football linebacker who played for the Hamilton Tiger-Cats of the Canadian Football League (CFL). He played college football at Hawaii.

== Early life ==
Pavihi was born in Pago Pago, American Samoa. He played high school football at Tafuna High School in Tafuna, American Samoa, and was a four-year letterman. He was named the 2016 American Samoa High School Athletic Association (ASHSAA) Defensive Player of the Year while also earning first team all-ASHSAA honors. Pavihi was rated the No. 2 recruit from American Samoa in the class of 2017.

== College career ==
Pavihi played college football at Hawaii from 2017 to 2022. He played in 12 games in 2017 and made five tackles. He played in 14 games, starting 13, in 2018, recording 87 tackles, 1.5 sacks, two pass breakups, one forced fumble and two fumble recoveries. Pavihi was redshirted in 2019 after suffering a season-ending injury before the start of the regular season. He appeared in nine games, starting four, during the COVID-19-shortened 2020 season, totaling 16 tackles, 1.5 sacks and one interception. He started 12 games in 2021, accumulating 47 tackles, one sack, one pass breakup and one fumble recovery. Pavihi started 13 games in 2022, recording 78 tackles, two sacks, one pass breakup, and one interception, which was returned for a touchdown. He also served as a team captain in 2022.

== Professional career ==
Pavihi was selected by the Hamilton Tiger-Cats of the Canadian Football League (CFL) in the first round, with the fourth overall pick, of the 2023 CFL global draft. He signed with the team on May 11, 2023. He was placed on injured reserve on June 17 and activated from injured reserve on June 22, 2023. Pavihi dressed in 17 games for the Tiger-Cats in 2023, recording four tackles on defense and two special teams tackles. He was released on March 6, 2025.
