= 2021 Nevada Wolf Pack football team =

American college football season

2021 Nevada Wolf Pack football

Quick Lane Bowl, L 24–52 vs. Western Michigan
- Conference: Mountain West Conference
- West Division
- Record: 8–5 (5–3 MW)
- Head coach: Jay Norvell (5th season; regular season); Vai Taua (interim, bowl game)
- Offensive coordinator: Matt Mumme (5th season)
- Offensive scheme: Air raid
- Defensive coordinator: Brian Ward (2nd season)
- Base defense: Multiple
- Captains: Carson Strong; Jermaine Ledbetter; Lawson Hall; Sam Hammond

2021 Mountain West Conference football standings
	Conf.			Overall
Team	W		L	W		L
Mountain Division
No. 24 Utah State xy$	6	–	2	11	–	3
Air Force x	6	–	2	10	–	3
Boise State	5	–	3	7	–	5
Wyoming	2	–	6	7	–	6
Colorado State	2	–	6	3	–	9
New Mexico	1	–	7	3	–	9
West Division
No. 25 San Diego State xy	7	–	1	12	–	2
Fresno State	6	–	2	10	–	3
Nevada	5	–	3	8	–	5
Hawaii	3	–	5	6	–	7
San Jose State	3	–	5	5	–	7
UNLV	2	–	6	2	–	10
Championship: Utah State 46, San Diego State 13
$ – Conference champion; x – Division champion/co-champions; y – Championship game participant; Rankings from AP Poll

The 2021 Nevada Wolf Pack football team represented the University of Nevada, Reno, in the 2021 NCAA Division I FBS football season. The Wolf Pack were led by fifth–year head coach Jay Norvell and played their home games at Mackay Stadium. They competed as members of the West Division of the Mountain West Conference.

== Preseason ==
=== Award watch lists ===
Listed in the order they were released

Award	Player	Position	Year
Maxwell Award	Romeo Doubs	WR	SR
Maxwell Award	Carson Strong	QB	JR
Chuck Bednarik Award	Lawson Hall	LB	FY
Davey O'Brien Award	Carson Strong	QB	JR
Fred Biletnikoff Award	Elijah Cooks	WR	GS
Fred Biletnikoff Award	Romeo Doubs	WR	SR
Fred Biletnikoff Award	Cole Turner	TE	SR
Rimington Trophy	Tyler Orsini	OL	GS
John Mackey Award	Cole Turner	TE	SR
Jim Thorpe Award	Berdale Robins	DB	FY
Lou Groza Award	Brandon Talton	PK	JR
Paul Hornung Award	Romeo Doubs	WR	SR
Manning Award	Carson Strong	QB	JR
Johnny Unitas Golden Arm Award	Carson Strong	QB	JR

=== Mountain West media days ===
The Mountain West media days were held on July 21–22, 2021, at the Cosmopolitan in Paradise, Nevada.

==== Media poll ====
The preseason poll was released on July 21, 2021. The Wolf Pack were predicted to finish in first place in the MW West Division.

==== Preseason All-Mountain West Team ====
The Wolf Pack had four players selected to the preseason All–Mountain West Team; three from the offense and one from the specialists.

Offense

Romeo Doubs – WR

Carson Strong – QB

Cole Turner – TE

Specialists

Brandon Talton – PK

== Schedule ==
Date	Time	Opponent	Site	TV	Result	Attendance
September 4	7:30 p.m.	at California*	California Memorial Stadium; Berkeley, CA	FS1	W 22–17	35,117
September 11	7:30 p.m.	Idaho State*	Mackay Stadium; Reno, NV	KNSN-TV/Stadium	W 49–10	23,965
September 18	11:00 a.m.	at Kansas State*	Bill Snyder Family Football Stadium; Manhattan, KS	ESPN+	L 17–38	48,768
October 2	12:30 p.m.	at Boise State	Albertsons Stadium; Boise, ID (rivalry)	FS1	W 41–31	37,426
October 9	7:30 p.m.	New Mexico State*	Mackay Stadium; Reno, NV	CBSSN	W 55–28	21,448
October 16	7:30 p.m.	Hawaii^{†}	Mackay Stadium; Reno, NV	CBSSN	W 34–17	22,098
October 23	4:00 p.m.	at Fresno State	Bulldog Stadium; Fresno, CA	FS1	L 32–34	33,012
October 29	7:00 p.m.	UNLV	Mackay Stadium; Reno, NV (Battle for the Fremont Cannon / Silver State Series)	CBSSN	W 51–20	28,960
November 6	7:00 p.m.	San Jose State	Mackay Stadium; Reno, NV	FS2	W 27–24	17,770
November 13	7:30 p.m.	at No. 22 San Diego State	Dignity Health Sports Park; Carson, CA	CBSSN	L 21–23	11,821
November 19	6:00 p.m.	Air Force	Mackay Stadium; Reno, NV	FS1	L 39–41 ^{3OT}	15,206
November 27	6:00 p.m.	at Colorado State	Canvas Stadium; Fort Collins, CO	CBSSN	W 52–10	17,465
December 27	8:00 a.m.	vs. Western Michigan*	Ford Field; Detroit, MI (Quick Lane Bowl)	ESPN	L 24–52	22,321
*Non-conference game; ^{†}Homecoming; Rankings from AP Poll (and CFP Rankings, after November 2) - Released prior to game; All times are in Pacific time

== Rankings ==
Ranking movements Legend: ██ Increase in ranking ██ Decrease in ranking — = Not ranked RV = Received votes
	Week															
Poll	Pre	1	2	3	4	5	6	7	8	9	10	11	12	13	14	Final
AP	RV	RV	RV	—	—	—	—	—	—	RV	—	—	—	—	—	
Coaches	RV	RV	RV	RV	—	RV	RV	—	—	—	RV	—	—	—	—	
CFP	Not released									—	—	—	—	—	—	Not released

== Personnel ==
2021 Nevada Wolf Pack football team roster
Players
Coaches
Offense

Pos.	#	Name	Class
WR	1	Melquan Stovall	Jr
RB	2	Devonte Lee	Sr
WR	3	Jamaal Bell	So
WR	4	Elijah Cooks	GS
QB	6	Hamish McClure	Jr
WR	7	Romeo Doubs	Sr
QB	10	Drew Scolari	Fr
QB	11	Clay Millen	Fr
QB	12	Carson Strong (C)	Jr
WR	13	Carson Walters	Jr
QB	14	Jake Barlage	Jr
TE	15	Henry Ikahihifo	So
QB	16	Nate Cox	Sr
WR	17	Justin Lockhart	Jr
QB	18	Jonah Chong	So
TE	19	Cole Turner	Sr
WR	20	Jeshua Fixel	So
WR	20	Tory Horton	So
RB	22	Ty Collins	Fr
RB	23	Jacques Badolato–Birdsell	Fr
WR	24	Tyrese Mack	Fr
RB	25	Avery Morrow	So
RB	26	Terrell Johnson	Sr
TE	31	Reagan Roberson	GS
RB	32	Wesley Kommer	So
RB	33	Dylan Overstreet	Fr
RB	35	Toa Taua	Sr
OL	54	Jermaine Ledbetter (C)	GS
OL	55	Tyler Orsini	GS
OL	56	Zac Welch	Fr
OL	58	Trevyn Heil	Fr
OL	60	Donovan Carter	So
OL	61	Drew Cannon	Sr
OL	62	Frank Poso	So
OL	63	R.J. Taylor	So
OL	65	Aaron Frost	Sr
OL	67	Gray Davis	Sr
OL	68	Jacob Nunez	Fr
OL	71	Grant Starck	So
OL	72	Dominic Eldridge	Fr
OL	75	Jacob Gardner	So
OL	77	Trey Hamilton	Jr
OL	78	Andrew Madrigal	Fr
OL	79	Moses Landis	Sr
TE	81	Carlton Brown III	Fr
WR	83	Aaron Smith	So
WR	84	Jeremiah Gradowitz	So
WR	87	Dazure Paggett	Fr

Defense

Pos.	#	Name	Class
DB	1	Berdale Robins
CB	2	Isaiah Essissima	Jr
DB	5	Emany Johnson	Jr
DB	6	Tyson Williams	Sr
DE	7	Kameron Toomer	GS
DB	9	Zeke Robbins	Jr
LB	10	Lamin Touray	Sr
LB	11	Daiyan Henley	Sr
DB	12	Kacee Williams	So
DB	13	Jordan Lee	Sr
CB	14	Zach Lewis	Fr
DB	15	Jaden Dedman	Jr
DT	16	Maurice Wilmer	So
DT	17	Crishaun Lappin	Sr
DB	19	Richard Toney	Fr
DB	20	Tyriq Mack	Sr
DB	20	Bentlee Sanders
DB	22	Jayce Godley	Jr
DE	23	Jack Powers	Jr
DB	24	Chad Brown	So
DB	24	Micah Camat	So
DB	25	A.J. King	So
DB	26	Avery Carrington	So
DB	29	Devin Gunter	So
LB	30	Lawson Hall (C)
DB	31	Mikael Bradford	Sr
LB	32	Drue Watts	Fr
DB	33	JoJuan Claiborne	Sr
LB	34	Josiah Bradley	Jr
LB	36	Naki Mateialona	So
DB	37	Marquese Allen–Patmon	So
DB	38	Christian Swint	Sr
DB	39	Micah Lilo	So
CB	40	Dorian Blackwell	Fr
LB	42	Davion Blackwell	So
DB	42	Zion Burns	Fr
DE	44	Daniel Grzesiak	Jr
LB	45	Trevor Price	Sr
DB	46	Aedan Seiuli	Fr
DL	52	Dwight Togiola	Fr
DT	53	Zak Mahannah	GS
DE	54	Dion Washington	Fr
LB	56	Adam Weynand	So
LB	59	Peter Montini	So
DT	66	Thomas White	So
DT	73	Christopher Love	Jr
DE	80	Caleb Manson	Fr
DE	90	Breylon Garcia	Jr
DE	91	Jeremiah Bodwin	Fr
DT	92	Amir Johnson	Sr
DT	93	Curtis Bonam	So
DE	94	Isaiah Overton	Fr
DT	95	Tristan Nichols	GS
DT	96	Teivis Tuioti	So
DT	97	Aaron Overton Jr.	So
DE	98	Sam Hammond (C)	GS
DT	99	Dom Peterson	Sr

Special teams

Pos.	#	Name	Class
PK	18	Matthew Killam	So
PK	43	Brandon Talton	Jr
PK	48	Matt Freem	Sr
PK	49	Julian Diaz	GS
LS	85	Austin Ortega	Jr
LS	88	Nick Barcelos	Fr
P		Paddy Turner	Fr

Head coach

- Jay Norvell (Iowa)

Coordinators/assistant coaches

- Matt Mumme (Kentucky and Southeastern Louisiana)
  Offensive coordinator
  Quarterbacks
- Brian Ward (McPherson)
  Defensive coordinator
  Defensive tackles
- Thomas Sheffield (Sam Houston State)
  Special Teams Coordinator
- Bill Best (Louisiana–Monroe and West Texas A&M)
  Offensive Line
- Timmy Chang (Hawaii)
  Wide Receivers
- Chad Savage (San Diego State)
  Tight Ends
- Jackie Shipp (Oklahoma)
  Defensive Ends
- Vai Taua (Nevada)
  Running Backs
- Ronnie Wheat (Millsaps)
  Linebackers
- Jordon Simmons (Lenoir–Rhyne and Oklahoma)
  Director of Football Strength and Conditioning
  Assistant Head Coach
- Brett Bartolone (Washington State)
  Offensive Analyst
- Riccardo Stewart (Arizona State and Bakke Graduate)
  Secondary
- Jack Ray (Arkansas–Pine Bluff)
  Special Teams Analyst
- Craig Watts (West Texas A&M)
  Offensive Graduate Assistant
- Ben Putman (Nevada)
  Offensive Graduate Assistant
- Jimbo Davis (Nevada)
  Defensive Graduate Assistant
- Will Heffner (Boise State and CSU–Pueblo)
  Defensive Graduate Assistant

Support staff

- Jashon Sykes (Colorado)
  Senior Associate AD, Football Operations
- Lucas Gauthier (UCLA)
  Director of player personnel
- Colton Bosnos (Shasta and Nevada)
  Assistant Director of player personnel
- Adam Hodge
  Video Coordinator
- Harold Smith
  Graphic Designer
- Rhonda Lundin Bennett (Northwestern)
  Sports Administrator
- Ryan Mitchell (Occidental and Seattle)
  Senior Associate Director of Athletics for Intercollegiate Services
- Andrew Caudill
  Assistant AD, Academics
- Spencer Hiett
  MS, LAT, ATC Assistant Director of Sports Medicine
- Shannon O'Hair
  Football Equipment Manager
- Cindy Breeden
  Administrative Assistant
- Silas Clapham (Washington)
  Recruiting Assistant

Legend

- (C) Team captain
- (S) Suspended
- (I) Ineligible
- Injured
- Redshirt

Roster
Last update: August 15, 2021

=== Depth chart ===
†	As of August 15, 2021

Defense

NICKEL
Jordan Lee
⋅
⋅

FS
Christian Swint
OR
JoJuan Claiborne
⋅
⋅

WILL	MIKE
Lamin Touray; OR; Daiyan Henley	Lawson Hall
Trevor Price	Josiah Bradley
⋅	Naki Mateialona

SS
Tyson Williams
Jayce Godley
Emany Johnson

CB
Berdale Robins
OR
Jaden Dedman
⋅
⋅

DE	DT	DT	DE
Kameron Toomer	Zak Mahannah	Dom Peterson	Sam Hammond
Jack Powers	Christopher Love	Amir Johnson	Daniel Grzesiak
⋅	⋅	⋅	⋅

CB
A.J. King
OR
Mikael Bradford
⋅
⋅

Offense

X
Justin Lockhart
Tory Horton
⋅

H
Melquan Stovall
Jamaal Bell
⋅

LT	LG	C	RG	RT
Jacob Gardner	Jermaine Ledbetter	Tyler Orsini	Zac Welch	Aaron Frost
Moses Landis	Gray Davis	⋅	⋅	⋅
⋅	⋅	⋅	⋅	⋅

TE
Cole Turner
Reagan Roberson
Henry Ikahihifo

Z
Romeo Doubs
⋅
⋅

QB
Carson Strong
Nate Cox
Jake Barlage

RB
Toa Taua
OR
Devonte Lee
Avery Morrow
⋅

Special teams
PK Brandon Talton
P Julian Diaz
KR Jamaal Bell
Melquan Stovall
PR Romeo Doubs
LS Austin Ortega
H Hamish McClure

== Game summaries ==
=== At California ===
Nevada at California

Team	1	2	3	4	Total
• Wolf Pack	0	13	9	0	22
Golden Bears	14	0	0	3	17

- Date: September 4, 2021
- Location: California Memorial Stadium
  Berkeley, CA
- Game start: 7:45 p.m. PDT
- Elapsed time: 3 hours and 24 minutes
- Game attendance: 35,117
- Game weather: Temperature: 64 °F (18 °C) • Weather: Sunny • Wind: W 10 MPH
- Referee: Steven Strimling
- TV announcers (FS1): Alex Faust (play–by–play) and Petros Papadakis (analyst)

Scoring summary
1	05:47	CAL	Damien Moore 1–yard run (Dario Longhetto kick) (15 plays, 63 yards, 9:05)	CAL 7–0
1	00:03	CAL	Nikko Remigio 2–yard pass from Chase Garbers (Dario Longhetto kick) (9 plays, 72 yards, 4:08)	CAL 14–0
2	10:50	NEV	Brandon Talton 44–yard field goal (9 plays, 56 yards, 4:10)	CAL 14–3
2	06:15	NEV	Romeo Doubs 43–yard pass from Carson Strong (Brandon Talton kick) (5 plays, 68 yards, 1:57)	CAL 14–10
2	00:02	NEV	Brandon Talton 35–yard field goal (7 plays, 23 yards, 0:44)	CAL 14–13
3	12:00	NEV	Elijah Cooks 16–yard pass from Carson Strong (pass failed) (7 plays, 75 yards, 2:52)	NEV 19–14
3	06:26	NEV	Brandon Talton 49–yard field goal (9 plays, 25 yards, 3:40)	NEV 22–14
4	12:59	CAL	Dario Longhetto 24–yard field goal (9 plays, 64 yards, 3:10)	NEV 22–17

Statistics	Nevada	California
First downs	19	17
Total yards	373	330
Rushing yards	61	153
Passing yards	312	177
Turnovers	0	0
Time of possession	27:42	32:18

Team	Category	Player	Statistics
Nevada	Passing	Carson Strong	22/39, 312 yards, 2 TDs, 1 INT
Nevada	Rushing	Toa Taua	10 carries, 37 yards
Nevada	Receiving	Tory Horton	3 receptions, 94 yards
California	Passing	Chase Garbers	25/38, 177 yards, 1 TD, 1 INT
California	Rushing	Damien Moore	15 carries, 79 yards, 1 TD
California	Receiving	Jeremiah Hunter	2 receptions, 35 yards

=== Idaho State ===
Idaho State at Nevada

Team	1	2	3	4	Total
Bengals	7	0	3	0	10
• Wolf Pack	14	7	7	21	49

- Date: September 11, 2021
- Location: Mackay Stadium
  Reno, NV
- Game start: 7:36 p.m. PDT
- Elapsed time: 3 hours and 7 minutes
- Game attendance: 23,965
- Game weather: Temperature: 82 °F (28 °C) • Weather: Sunny • Wind: W 11 MPH
- Referee: Timothy Davis
- TV announcers (KNSN-TV/Stadium): Noah Coslov (play–by–play) and Jordan Palmer (analyst)

Scoring summary
1	08:33	NEV	Cole Turner 6–yard pass from Carson Strong (Brandon Talton kick) (14 plays, 75 yards, 6:27)	NEV 7–0
1	04:17	ISU	Oshea Trujillo 1–yard run (Kevin Ryan kick) (10 plays, 75 yards, 4:16)	TIE 7–7
1	00:59	NEV	Elijah Cooks 12–yard pass from Carson Strong (Brandon Talton kick) (6 plays, 90 yards, 3:13)	NEV 14–7
2	00:43	NEV	Elijah Cooks 12–yard pass from Carson Strong (Brandon Talton kick) (7 plays, 78 yards, 2:34)	NEV 21–7
3	09:56	ISU	Kevin Ryan 42–yard field goal (12 plays, 50 yards, 5:04)	NEV 21–10
3	01:43	NEV	Devonte Lee 2–yard run (Brandon Talton kick) (8 plays, 80 yards, 3:15)	NEV 28–10
4	11:03	NEV	Devonte Lee 15–yard pass from Carson Strong (Brandon Talton kick) (7 plays, 90 yards, 3:05)	NEV 35–10
4	09:41	NEV	Dom Peterson 12–yard fumble recovery (Brandon Talton kick)	NEV 42–10
4	04:45	NEV	Harry Ballard 43–yard pass from Nate Cox (Brandon Talton kick) (4 plays, 80 yards, 1:25)	NEV 49–10

Statistics	Idaho State	Nevada
First downs	18	26
Total yards	283	586
Rushing yards	141	145
Passing yards	142	441
Turnovers	5	0
Time of possession	32:49	27:11

Team	Category	Player	Statistics
Idaho State	Passing	Tyler Vander Waal	10/17, 107 yards
Idaho State	Rushing	Malakai Rango	10 carries, 72 yards
Idaho State	Receiving	Xavier Guillory	5 receptions, 54 yards
Nevada	Passing	Carson Strong	34/43, 381 yards, 4 TDs
Nevada	Rushing	Toa Taua	9 carries, 103 yards
Nevada	Receiving	Elijah Cooks	7 receptions, 89 yards, 2 TDs

=== At Kansas State ===
Nevada at Kansas State

Team	1	2	3	4	Total
Wolf Pack	7	0	10	0	17
• Wildcats	7	10	0	21	38

- Date: September 18, 2021
- Location: Bill Snyder Family Football Stadium
  Manhattan, KS
- Game start: 1:05 p.m. CDT
- Elapsed time: 3 hours and 25 minutes
- Game attendance: 48,768
- Game weather: Temperature: 86 °F (30 °C) • Weather: Sunny • Wind: SW 6 MPH
- Referee: David Alvarez
- TV announcers (ESPN+): Shawn Kenney (play–by–play), Barrett Brooks (analyst) and Shane Sparks (sideline)

Scoring summary
1	14:16	KSU	Daniel Imatorbhebhe 68–yard pass from Will Howard (Taiten Winkel kick) (2 plays, 75 yards, 0:44)	KSU 7–0
1	00:08	NEV	Devonte Lee 1–yard run (Brandon Talton kick) (8 plays, 74 yards, 2:31)	TIE 7–7
2	11:42	KSU	Joe Ervin 22–yard run (Taiten Winkel kick) (8 plays, 75 yards, 3:26)	KSU 14–7
2	02:08	KSU	Taiten Winkel 37–yard field goal (10 plays, 38 yards, 4:37)	KSU 17–7
3	10:35	NEV	Brandon Talton 46–yard field goal (8 plays, 47 yards, 4:06)	KSU 17–10
3	04:08	NEV	Elijah Cooks 14–yard pass from Carson Strong (Brandon Talton kick) (9 plays, 42 yards, 5:07)	TIE 17–17
4	14:54	KSU	Deuce Vaughn 11–yard run (Taiten Winkel kick) (8 plays, 75 yards, 4:14)	KSU 24–17
4	06:12	KSU	Will Howard 2–yard run (Taiten Winkel kick) (11 plays, 62 yards, 6:09)	KSU 31–17
4	01:12	KSU	Will Howard 1–yard run (Taiten Winkel kick) (8 plays, 31 yards, 4:11)	KSU 38–17

Statistics	Nevada	Kansas State
First downs	14	22
Total yards	331	398
Rushing yards	25	269
Passing yards	306	129
Turnovers	1	0
Time of possession	29:00	31:00

Team	Category	Player	Statistics
Nevada	Passing	Carson Strong	27/40, 262 yards, 1 TD, 1 INT
Nevada	Rushing	Devonte Lee	10 carries, 24 yards, 1 TD
Nevada	Receiving	Romeo Doubs	7 receptions, 121 yards
Kansas State	Passing	Will Howard	7/10, 123 yards, 1 TD
Kansas State	Rushing	Deuce Vaughn	23 carries, 127 yards, 1 TD
Kansas State	Receiving	Daniel Imatorbhebhe	1 reception, 68 yards, 1 TD

=== At Boise State ===
Nevada at Boise State
(Rivalry)

Team	1	2	3	4	Total
• Wolf Pack	10	10	18	3	41
Broncos	14	7	3	7	31

- Date: October 2, 2021
- Location: Albertsons Stadium
  Boise, ID
- Game start: 1:36 p.m. MDT
- Elapsed time: 3 hours and 25 minutes
- Game attendance: 37,426
- Game weather: Temperature: 69 °F (21 °C) • Weather: Sunny • Wind: N/A
- Referee: Brandon Cruse
- TV announcers (FS1): Alex Faust (play–by–play) and Petros Papadakis (analyst)

Scoring summary
1	10:36	NEV	Cole Turner 7–yard pass from Carson Strong (Brandon Talton kick) (11 plays, 67 yards, 4:17)	NEV 7–0
1	07:47	BSU	Stefan Cobbs 25–yard pass from Hank Bachmeier (Jonah Dalmas kick) (9 plays, 81 yards, 2:43)	TIE 7–7
1	04:54	NEV	Brandon Talton 38–yard field goal (9 plays, 54 yards, 2:53)	NEV 10–7
1	00:53	BSU	Khalil Shakir 23–yard pass from Hank Bachmeier (Jonah Dalmas kick) (8 plays, 73 yards, 3:55)	BSU 14–10
2	12:26	NEV	Devonte Lee 2–yard run (Brandon Talton kick) (10 plays, 57 yards, 3:21)	NEV 17–14
2	02:28	BSU	Stefan Cobbs 5–yard pass from Hank Bachmeier (Jonah Dalmas kick) (3 plays, 40 yards, 1:19)	BSU 21–17
2	00:00	NEV	Brandon Talton 37–yard field goal (11 plays, 56 yards, 2:22)	BSU 21–20
3	12:55	NEV	Toa Taua 12–yard run (Romeo Doubs pass) (3 plays, 18 yards, 1:55)	NEV 28–21
3	08:59	BSU	Jonah Dalmas 31–yard field goal (9 plays, 61 yards, 3:56)	NEV 28–24
3	06:01	NEV	Brandon Talton 33–yard field goal (6 plays, 59 yards, 2:58)	NEV 31–24
3	02:40	NEV	Toa Taua 22–yard run (Brandon Talton kick) (3 plays, 60 yards, 0:48)	NEV 38–24
4	10:42	NEV	Brandon Talton 38–yard field goal (4 plays, 8 yards, 1:55)	NEV 41–24
4	03:15	BSU	Octavius Evans 4–yard pass from Hank Bachmeier (Jonah Dalmas kick) (15 plays, 80 yards, 4:54)	NEV 41–31

Statistics	Nevada	Boise State
First downs	18	24
Total yards	393	410
Rushing yards	130	22
Passing yards	263	388
Turnovers	0	6
Time of possession	28:01	31:59

Team	Category	Player	Statistics
Nevada	Passing	Carson Strong	25/38, 263 yards, 1 TD
Nevada	Rushing	Toa Taua	12 carries, 124 yards, 2 TDs
Nevada	Receiving	Justin Lockhart	5 receptions, 94 yards
Boise State	Passing	Hank Bachmeier	34/47, 388 yards, 4 TDs, 1 INT
Boise State	Rushing	Cyrus Habibi–Likio	10 carries, 46 yards
Boise State	Receiving	Stefan Cobbs	10 receptions, 132 yards, 2 TDs

=== New Mexico State ===
New Mexico State at Nevada

Team	1	2	3	4	Total
Aggies	7	0	0	21	28
• Wolf Pack	3	28	21	2	54

- Date: October 9, 2021
- Location: Mackay Stadium
  Reno, NV
- Game start: 7:30 p.m. PDT
- Game attendance: 21,448
- TV announcers (CBSSN): Jason Knapp (play–by–play), Ross Tucker (analyst) and Desmond Purnell (sideline)

Statistics	New Mexico State	Nevada
First downs	25	27
Total yards	452	532
Rushing yards	27	69
Passing yards	425	463
Turnovers	1	1
Time of possession	32:21	27:39

Team	Category	Player	Statistics
New Mexico State	Passing	Jonah Johnson	38/62, 425 yards, 3 TD
New Mexico State	Rushing	Juwaun Price	10 carries, 37 yards
New Mexico State	Receiving	Isaiah Garcia-Castaneda	5 receptions, 76 yards
Nevada	Passing	Carson Strong	25/32, 377 yards, 6 TD, INT
Nevada	Rushing	Toa Taua	7 carries, 28 yards
Nevada	Receiving	Melquan Stovall	7 receptions, 155 yards, TD

=== Hawaii ===
Hawaii at Nevada

Team	1	2	3	4	Total
Rainbow Warriors	7	10	0	0	17
• Wolf Pack	3	17	14	0	34

- Date: October 16, 2021
- Location: Mackay Stadium
  Reno, NV
- Game start: 7:30 p.m. PDT
- Elapsed time: 3 hours and 40 minutes
- Game attendance: 22,098
- Referee: M. Vandervelde
- Television network: CBSSN

Statistics	Hawaii	Nevada
First downs		
Total yards		
Rushing yards		
Passing yards		
Turnovers		
Time of possession		

Team	Category	Player	Statistics
Hawaii	Passing		
Hawaii	Rushing		
Hawaii	Receiving		
Nevada	Passing		
Nevada	Rushing		
Nevada	Receiving		

=== At Fresno State ===
Nevada at Fresno State

Team	1	2	3	4	Total
Wolf Pack	3	7	6	16	32
• Bulldogs	7	7	14	6	34

- Date: October 23, 2021
- Location: Bulldog Stadium
  Fresno, CA
- Game start: 4:00 p.m. PDT
- Game attendance: 33,012
- Game weather: Temperature: 69 °F (21 °C) • Weather: Partly Cloudy • Wind: NW 8 mph
- TV announcers (FS1): Dan Hellie (play-by-play) & Petros Papadakis (analyst)

Scoring summary
1	5:37	NEV	Brandon Talton 32-yard field goal (10 plays, 48 yards, 3:13)	NEV 3–0
1	5:08	FRES	Ronnie Rivers 64-yard run (Cesar Silva kick) (3 plays, 75 yards, 0:28)	FRES 7–3
2	14:11	FRES	Jordan Mims 1-yard run (Cesar Silva kick) (10 plays, 91 yards, 3:19)	FRES 14–3
2	10:10	NEV	Cole Turner 2-yard pass from Carson Strong (Brandon Talton kick) (2 plays, 12 yards, 0:41)	FRES 14–10
3	13:21	FRES	Keric Wheatfall 11–yard pass from Jake Haener (Cesar Silva kick) (5 plays, 65 yards, 1:39)	FRES 21–10
3	8:46	NEV	Justin Lockheart 30-yard pass from Carson Strong (Two-point pass conversion failed) (10 plays, 65 yards, 4:29)	FRES 21–16
3	4:50	FRES	Jordan Mims 7-yard pass from Jake Haener (Cesar Silva kick) (9 plays, 88 yards, 3:52)	FRES 28–16
4	14:56	NEV	Romeo Doubs 11-yard pass from Carson Strong (Brandon Talton kick) (9 plays, 68 yards, 4:46)	FRES 28–23
4	12:37	FRES	Cesar Silva 47–yard field goal (8 plays, 46 yards, 2:19)	FRES 31–23
4	5:48	FRES	Cesar Silva 43-yard field goal (9 plays, 39 yards, 4:16)	FRES 34–23
4	4:21	NEV	Brandon Talton 38-yard field goal (7 plays, 58 yards, 1:21)	FRES 34–26
4	0:02	NEV	Cole Turner 12–yard pass from Carson Strong (Two-point pass conversion failed) (8 plays, 90 yards, 0:51)	FRES 34–32

Statistics	Nevada	Fresno State
First downs	30	24
Total yards	501	474
Rushing yards	47	205
Passing yards	476	256
Turnovers	2	1
Time of possession	34:03	25:55

Team	Category	Player	Statistics
Nevada	Passing	Carson Strong	49/61, 476 yards, 4 TD, INT
Nevada	Rushing	Toa Taua	12 carries, 62 yards
Nevada	Receiving	Romeo Doubs	19 receptions, 203 yards, TD
Fresno State	Passing	Jake Haener	26/38, 256 yards, 2 TD
Fresno State	Rushing	Ronnie Rivers	23 carries, 134 yards, TD
Fresno State	Receiving	Keric Wheatfall	5 receptions, 84 yards, TD

=== UNLV ===
UNLV at Nevada
(Battle for the Fremont Cannon / Silver State Series)

Team	1	2	3	4	Total
Rebels	0	0	7	13	20
• Wolf Pack	10	10	21	10	51

- Date: October 29, 2021
- Location: Mackay Stadium
  Reno, NV
- Game start: 7:00 p.m. PDT
- Game attendance: 28,960
- Television network: CBSSN

Statistics	UNLV	Nevada
First downs		
Total yards		
Rushing yards		
Passing yards		
Turnovers		
Time of possession		

Team	Category	Player	Statistics
UNLV	Passing		
UNLV	Rushing		
UNLV	Receiving		
Nevada	Passing		
Nevada	Rushing		
Nevada	Receiving		

=== San Jose State ===
San Jose State at Nevada

Team	1	2	Total
Spartans			0
Wolf Pack			0

- Date: November 6, 2021
- Location: Mackay Stadium
  Reno, NV
- Television network: FS2

Statistics	San Jose State	Nevada
First downs		
Total yards		
Rushing yards		
Passing yards		
Turnovers		
Time of possession		

Team	Category	Player	Statistics
San Jose State	Passing		
San Jose State	Rushing		
San Jose State	Receiving		
Nevada	Passing		
Nevada	Rushing		
Nevada	Receiving		

=== At No. 22 San Diego State ===
Nevada at San Diego State

Team	1	2	3	4	Total
Wolf Pack	0	7	7	7	21
• No. 22 Aztecs	7	3	7	6	23

- Date: November 13, 2021
- Location: Dignity Health Sports Park
  Carson, CA
- Game start: 7:30 p.m. PST
- Game attendance: 11,821
- Game weather: Clear • Temperature: 65 °F (18 °C)
- Referee: Timothy Davis
- TV announcers (CBSSN): Rich Waltz (play-by-play), Aaron Taylor (analysis), Jenny Dell (sidelines), and Deb Boulac (producer)

Scoring summary
1	3:42	SDSU	Daniel Bellinger 2-yard pass from Lucas Johnson (Matt Araiza kick) (12 plays, 99 yards, 5:39)	SDSU 7–0
2	14:55	NEV	Tory Horton 28–yard pass from Carson Strong (Brandon Talton kick) (8 plays, 85 yards, 3:41)	TIED 7–7
2	9:35	SDSU	Matt Araiza 48–yard field goal (9 plays, 36 yards, 5:11)	SDSU 10–7
3	9:31	SDSU	Chance Bell 5–yard run (Matt Araiza kick) (8 plays, 75 yards, 3:25)	SDSU 17–7
3	2:20	NEV	Romeo Doubs 5-yard pass from Carson Strong (Brandon Talton kick) (9 plays, 80 yards, 2:46)	SDSU 17–14
4	11:58	SDSU	Matt Araiza 39-yard field goal (7 plays, 15 yards, 2:48)	SDSU 20–14
4	9:57	NEV	Romeo Doubs 54-yard pass from Carson Strong (Brandon Talton kick) (4 plays, 75 yards, 2:01)	NEV 21–20
4	1:21	SDSU	Matt Araiza 35–yard field goal (12 plays, 53 yards, 3:12)	SDSU 23–20

Statistics	Nevada	San Diego State
First downs	19	20
Total yards	358	362
Rushing yards	8	186
Passing yards	350	176
Turnovers	0	0
Time of possession	26:32	33:28

Team	Category	Player	Statistics
Nevada	Passing	Carson Strong	34/48, 350 yards, 3 TD
Nevada	Rushing	Toa Taua	9 carries, 31 yards
Nevada	Receiving	Romeo Doubs	9 receptions, 127 yards, 2 TD
San Diego State	Passing	Lucas Johnson	21/34, 176 yards, TD
San Diego State	Rushing	Greg Bell	16 carries, 104 yards
San Diego State	Receiving	Elijah Kothe	6 receptions, 71 yards

=== Air Force ===
Air Force at Nevada

Team	1	2	3	4	Total
Falcons	0	17	7	0	24
Wolf Pack	3	0	7	14	24

- Date: November 19, 2021
- Location: Mackay Stadium
  Reno, NV
- Television network: FS1

Statistics	Air Force	Nevada
First downs		
Total yards		
Rushing yards		
Passing yards		
Turnovers		
Time of possession		

Team	Category	Player	Statistics
Air Force	Passing		
Air Force	Rushing		
Air Force	Receiving		
Nevada	Passing		
Nevada	Rushing		
Nevada	Receiving		

=== At Colorado State ===
Nevada at Colorado State

Team	1	2	3	4	Total
• Wolf Pack	14	17	7	4	42
Rams	0	0	7	3	10

- Date: November 27, 2021
- Location: Canvas Stadium
  Fort Collins, CO
- Game start: 7:00 p.m. MST
- Game attendance: 17,465
- Television network: CBSSN

Statistics	Nevada	Colorado State
First downs	22	20
Total yards	528	443
Rushing yards	226	230
Passing yards	302	213
Turnovers	0	5
Time of possession	28:56	31:04

Team	Category	Player	Statistics
Nevada	Passing	Carson Strong	17/22, 288 yards, 4 TD
Nevada	Rushing	Avery Morrow	5 carries, 88 yards, TD
Nevada	Receiving	Tory Horton	4 receptions, 113 yards, 2 TD
Colorado State	Passing	Todd Centeio	15/24, 185 yards, 2 INT
Colorado State	Rushing	Trey McBride	1 carry, 69 yards, TD
Colorado State	Receiving	Trey McBride	6 receptions, 113 yards
