= 2020 Nevada Wolf Pack football team =

American college football season

2020 Nevada Wolf Pack football

Famous Idaho Potato Bowl champion

Famous Idaho Potato Bowl, W 38–27 vs. Tulane
- Conference: Mountain West Conference
- Record: 7–2 (6–2 MW)
- Head coach: Jay Norvell (4th season)
- Offensive coordinator: Matt Mumme (4th season)
- Offensive scheme: Air raid
- Defensive coordinator: Brian Ward (1st season)
- Base defense: Multiple
- Captains: Carson Strong; Jermaine Ledbetter; Lawson Hall; Sam Hammond

2020 Mountain West Conference football standings
	Conf.			Overall
Team	W		L	W		L
No. 24 San Jose State y$	6	–	0	7	–	1
Boise State y	5	–	0	5	–	2
Nevada	6	–	2	7	–	2
San Diego State	4	–	2	4	–	4
Hawaii	4	–	4	5	–	4
Fresno State	3	–	3	3	–	3
Air Force	2	–	2	3	–	3
Wyoming	2	–	4	2	–	4
New Mexico	2	–	5	2	–	5
Colorado State	1	–	3	1	–	3
Utah State	1	–	5	1	–	5
UNLV	0	–	6	0	–	6
Championship: San Jose State 34, Boise State 20
$ – Conference champion; y – Championship game participant; Note: Due to COVID-19, the Mountain West suspended the season, but later decided to begin play on October 24.; Rankings from AP Poll

The 2020 Nevada Wolf Pack football team represented the University of Nevada, Reno in the 2020 NCAA Division I FBS football season. The Wolf Pack were led by fourth–year head coach Jay Norvell and played their home games at Mackay Stadium. They were members of the Mountain West Conference.

On August 10, 2020, the Mountain West Conference suspended all sports competitions due to the COVID-19 pandemic. On September 24, the conference announced that the football season would begin on October 24.

== Preseason ==
=== Award watch lists ===
Listed in the order that they were released

Award	Player	Position	Year
Chuck Bednarik Award	Dom Peterson	DL	JR
Doak Walker Award	Toa Taua	RB	JR
Fred Biletnikoff Award	Elijah Cooks	WR	SR
Bronko Nagurski Trophy	Dom Peterson	DL	JR
Outland Trophy	Dom Peterson	DL	JR
Lou Groza Award	Brandon Talton	PK	SO
Paul Hornung Award	Toa Taua	RB	JR
Wuerffel Trophy	Lawson Hall	LB	SR
Maxwell Award	Carson Strong	QB	SO

=== Mountain West media days ===
The Mountain West media days were originally scheduled on July 16–17, 2020, at SoFi Stadium in Inglewood, California, but were canceled in favor of virtual media days due to the COVID-19 pandemic. The virtual media days that were scheduled to take place on July 27–29, 2020, were also canceled.

==== Media poll ====
The preseason poll was released on July 21, 2020. The Wolf Pack were predicted to finish in second place in the MW West Division. The divisions were later suspended for the 2020 season.

==== Preseason All−Mountain West Team ====
The Wolf Pack had two players selected to the preseason All−Mountain West Team; one from the offense and one from the defense.

Offense

Brandon Talton – PK

Defense

Dom Peterson – DL

== Schedule ==
=== Original ===
Date	Opponent	Site	Result	Source
August 29	UC Davis*	Mackay Stadium; Reno, NV	Cancelled	
September 5	at Arkansas*	Donald W. Reynolds Razorback Stadium; Fayetteville, AR	Cancelled	
September 12	UTEP*	Mackay Stadium; Reno, NV	Cancelled	
September 19	at South Florida*	Raymond James Stadium; Tampa, FL	Cancelled	
September 26	San Diego State	Mackay Stadium; Reno, NV	Rescheduled	
October 3	at Hawaii	Aloha Stadium; Halawa, HI	Rescheduled	
October 17	at New Mexico	University Stadium; Albuquerque, NM	Rescheduled	
October 24	Fresno State	Mackay Stadium; Reno, NV	Rescheduled	
October 31	Utah State	Mackay Stadium; Reno, NV	Rescheduled	
November 7	at San Jose State	CEFCU Stadium; San Jose, CA	Rescheduled	
November 14	Wyoming	Mackay Stadium; Reno, NV	Rescheduled	
November 28	at UNLV	Allegiant Stadium; Paradise, NV (Fremont Cannon)	Rescheduled	
*Non-conference game

=== Revised ===
Date	Time	Opponent	Site	TV	Result	Attendance
October 24	4:00 p.m.	Wyoming	Mackay Stadium; Reno, NV	CBSSN	W 37–34 ^{OT}	250
October 31	7:30 p.m.	at UNLV	Allegiant Stadium; Paradise, NV (Fremont Cannon)	FS1	W 37–19	2,000
November 5	4:00 p.m.	Utah State	Mackay Stadium; Reno, NV	FS1	W 34–9	250
November 14	3:30 p.m.	at New Mexico	Sam Boyd Stadium; Whitney, NV (Note: The November 14 game against New Mexico, originally scheduled to be played at University Stadium in Albuquerque, was moved to Sam Boyd Stadium as a home game due to COVID-19 restrictions imposed by the state of New Mexico.)	FS2	W 27–20	250
November 21	12:30 p.m.	San Diego State	Mackay Stadium; Reno, NV	CBS	W 26–21	50
November 28	8:00 p.m.	at Hawaii	Aloha Stadium; Halawa, HI	KNSN-TV/SPEC HI	L 21–24	0
December 5	6:00 p.m.	Fresno State	Mackay Stadium; Reno, NV	FS2	W 37–26	50
December 11	7:00 p.m.	vs. San Jose State	Sam Boyd Stadium; Whitney, NV (Note: The December 11 game against San Jose State, originally scheduled to be played at CEFCU Stadium in San Jose, was moved to Sam Boyd Stadium as a site–neutral game due to COVID-19 restrictions imposed by Santa Clara County, California.)	CBSSN	L 20–30	0
December 22	12:30 p.m.	vs. Tulane*	Albertsons Stadium; Boise, ID (Famous Idaho Potato Bowl)	ESPN	W 38–27	0
*Non-conference game; All times are in Pacific time

== Rankings ==
Ranking movements Legend: ██ Increase in ranking ██ Decrease in ranking — = Not ranked RV = Received votes
	Week																	
Poll	Pre	1	2	3	4	5	6	7	8	9	10	11	12	13	14	15	16	Final
AP	—	—*	—	—	—	—	—	—	—	—	RV	RV	RV	—	RV	—	—	RV
Coaches	—	—*	—	—	—	—	—	—	—	RV	RV	RV	RV	RV	RV	RV	RV	RV
CFP	Not released												—	—	—	—	—	Not released

== Personnel ==
2020 Nevada Wolf Pack football team roster
Players
Coaches
Offense

Pos.	#	Name	Class
WR	1	Melquan Stovall	So
RB	2	Devonte Lee	Jr
WR	3	Jamaal Bell	Fr
WR	4	Elijah Cooks	Sr
WR	5	Isaac Jernagin	Fr
QB	6	Hamish McClure	So
WR	7	Romeo Doubs	Jr
TE	9	Crishaun Lappin	Jr
QB	12	Carson Strong (C)	So
WR	13	Carson Walters	So
QB	14	Jake Barlage	So
TE	15	Henry Ikahihifo	So
QB	16	Nate Cox	Jr
WR	17	Justin Lockhart	So
QB	18	Jonah Chong	Fr
TE	19	Cole Turner	Jr
WR	20	Jeshua Fixel	Fr
RB	24	Morian Walker Jr.	Sr
RB	25	Avery Morrow	Fr
RB	26	Terrell Johnson	Jr
TE	31	Reagan Roberson	Sr
RB	32	Wesley Kommer	Fr
RB	35	Toa Taua	Jr
OL	52	Cole Watts	Fr
OL	54	Jermaine Ledbetter (C)	Sr
OL	55	Tyler Orsini	Sr
OL	56	Zac Welch	Fr
OL	60	Donovan Carter	Fr
OL	61	Drew Cannon	Jr
OL	62	Frank Poso	Fr
OL	63	R.J. Taylor	Fr
OL	64	Blake Baughman	Fr
OL	65	Aaron Frost	Jr
OL	67	Gray Davis	Jr
OL	69	Trey Price	Jr
OL	70	Nathan Edwards	Sr
OL	71	Grant Starck	Fr
OL	75	Jacob Gardner	Fr
OL	76	Nate Brown	Sr
OL	77	Trey Hamilton	So
OL	79	Moses Landis	Jr
WR	81	Charles Ross	Fr
WR	82	Tory Horton	Fr
WR	83	Aaron Smith	Fr
WR	84	Jeremiah Gradowitz	Fr
WR	87	Will Barnard	So

Defense

Pos.	#	Name	Class
DB	1	Berdale Robins	Sr
DB	4	E.J. Muhammad	Sr
DB	5	Emany Johnson	So
DB	6	Tyson Williams	Jr
DE	7	Kameron Toomer	Sr
LB	8	James Fotofili	Jr
DB	9	Zeke Robbins	So
LB	10	Lamin Touray	Jr
LB	11	Daiyan Henley	Jr
DB	12	Kacee Williams	Fr
DB	13	Jordan Lee	Jr
DB	14	Mar'Quette Jackson	Sr
DB	15	Jaden Dedman	So
DT	16	Maurice Wilmer	Fr
DB	19	Kieran Clark	Fr
DB	22	Jayce Godley	So
DE	23	Jack Powers	So
DB	24	Micah Camat	Fr
DB	25	A.J. King	Fr
DB	26	Avery Carrington	Fr
DB	28	Austin Arnold	Sr
DB	29	Devin Gunter	Fr
LB	30	Lawson Hall (C)	Sr
DB	31	Mikael Bradford	Jr
DE	32	Giovanni Miranda	So
DB	33	JoJuan Claiborne	Jr
LB	34	Josiah Bradley	So
DB	35	Tyriq Mack	Jr
DB	37	Marquese Allen-Patmon	Fr
DB	38	Christian Swint	Jr
DB	39	Micah Lilo	Fr
LB	42	Davion Blackwell	Fr
DE	44	Daniel Grzesiak	So
LB	45	Trevor Price	Jr
LB	47	Adam Weynand	Fr
LB	50	Erick Kroll	Jr
LB	51	Naki Mateialona	Fr
DT	53	Zak Mahannah	Sr
DT	54	Chris Green	Sr
DE	57	Jaden Lewis	Jr
LB	59	Peter Montini	Fr
DT	66	Thomas White	Fr
DT	73	Christopher Love	So
DE	89	Jack Bolduc	So
DE	90	Breylon Garcia	So
DT	91	Adam Lopez	Sr
DT	92	Amir Johnson	Jr
DT	93	Curtis Bonam	Fr
DT	95	Tristan Nichols	Sr
DT	96	Teivis Tuioti	Fr
DT	97	Aaron Overton Jr.	Fr
DE	98	Sam Hammond (C)	Sr
DT	99	Dom Peterson	Jr

Special teams

Pos.	#	Name	Class
PK	18	Matthew Killam	Fr
P	40	Charlie Pollock	Fr
PK	43	Brandon Talton	So
P	46	Eric Fellenzer	So
PK	48	Matt Freem	Jr
PK	49	Julian Diaz	Sr
LS	85	Austin Ortega	So
LS	88	Nick Barcelos	Fr

Head coach

- Jay Norvell (Iowa)

Coordinators/assistant coaches

- Matt Mumme (Kentucky and Southeastern Louisiana)
  Offensive Coordinator
  Quarterbacks
- Brian Ward (McPherson)
  Defensive Coordinator
  Linebackers
- Thomas Sheffield (Sam Houston State)
  Special Teams Coordinator
- Freddie Banks (Mercyhurst and North Dakota State)
  Cornerbacks
- Bill Best (Louisiana–Monroe and West Texas A&M)
  Offensive Line
- Timmy Chang (Hawaii)
  Tight Ends
- Eric Scott (Northwestern and UCLA)
  Wide Receivers
- Jackie Shipp (Oklahoma)
  Defensive Line
- Vai Taua (Nevada)
  Running Backs
- Ronnie Wheat (Millsaps)
  Safeties
- Brett Bartolone (Washington State)
  Offensive Analyst
- Riccardo Stewart (Arizona State and Bakke Graduate)
  Defensive Analyst
- Jack Ray (Arkansas–Pine Bluff)
  Special Teams Analyst
- Jordon Simmons (Lenoir–Rhyne and Oklahoma)
  Director of Football Strength and Conditioning
  Assistant Head Coach
- Ben Putman (Nevada)
  Offensive Graduate Assistant
- Jimbo Davis (Nevada)
  Defensive Graduate Assistant
- Chance Alberswerth (Avila and Hastings)
  Defensive Graduate Assistant
- Gunnar White (Hinds Community, Texas Tech and Jackson State)
  Offensive Graduate Assistant

Support staff

- Jashon Sykes (Colorado)
  Senior Associate AD, Football Operations
- Lucas Gauthier (UCLA)
  Director of player personnel
- Colton Bosnos (Shasta and Nevada)
  Assistant Director of player personnel
- Adam Hodge
  Video Coordinator
- Harold Smith
  Graphic Designer
- Rhonda Lundin Bennett (Northwestern)
  Sports Administrator
- Ryan Mitchell (Occidental and Seattle)
  Senior Associate Director of Athletics for Intercollegiate Services
- Andrew Caudill
  Assistant AD, Academics
- Chad Hartley
  Associate AD, Strategic Communications
- Spencer Hiett
  MS, LAT, ATC Assistant Director of Sports Medicine
- Shannon O'Hair
  Football Equipment Manager
- Cindy Breeden
  Administrative Assistant
- Silas Clapham (Washington)
  Recruiting Assistant

Legend

- (C) Team captain
- (S) Suspended
- (I) Ineligible
- Injured
- Redshirt

Roster
Last update: October 13, 2020

=== Depth chart ===
†	As of November 30, 2020

Defense

NICKEL
E. J. Muhammad
Jordan Lee
⋅

FS
Christian Swint
OR
JoJuan Claiborne
⋅
⋅

WILL	MIKE
Lamin Touray; OR; Daiyan Henley	Lawson Hall
Trevor Price	Josiah Bradley
⋅	Naki Mateialona

SS
Tyson Williams
Jayce Godley
Emany Johnson

CB
Berdale Robins
OR
Jaden Dedman
⋅
⋅

DE	DT	DT	DE
Kameron Toomer	Zak Mahannah	Dom Peterson	Sam Hammond
Jack Powers	Christopher Love	Amir Johnson	Daniel Grzesiak
⋅	⋅	⋅	⋅

CB
A. J. King
OR
Mikael Bradford
Kieran Clark
⋅

Offense

X
Justin Lockhart
Tory Horton
⋅

H
Melquan Stovall
Jamaal Bell
Isaac Jernagin

LT	LG	C	RG	RT
Jacob Gardner	Jermaine Ledbetter	Tyler Orsini	Nate Brown	Aaron Frost
Moses Landis	Gray Davis	Nathan Edwards	Zac Welch	Cole Watts
⋅	⋅	⋅	⋅	⋅

TE
Cole Turner
Reagan Roberson
Henry Ikahihifo

Z
Romeo Doubs
Charles Ross
⋅

QB
Carson Strong
Nate Cox
Jake Barlage

RB
Toa Taua
OR
Devonte Lee
Avery Morrow
⋅

Special teams
PK Brandon Talton
P Julian Diaz
KR Jamaal Bell
Melquan Stovall
PR Romeo Doubs
OR Charles Ross
LS Austin Ortega
H Hamish McClure

== Game summaries ==
=== Wyoming ===
Wyoming at Nevada

Team	1	2	3	4	OT	Total
Cowboys	3	3	7	18	3	34
• Wolf Pack	7	7	14	3	6	37

- Date: October 24, 2020
- Location: Mackay Stadium
  Reno, NV
- Game start: 4:05 p.m. PDT
- Elapsed time: 4 hours and 11 minutes
- Game attendance: 250
- Game weather: Temperature: 61 °F (16 °C) • Weather: Clear Skies • Wind: N/A
- Referee: Timothy Davis
- TV announcers (CBSSN): Rich Waltz (play–by–play), Aaron Murray (analyst) and Amanda Guerra (sideline)

Scoring summary
1	06:25	NEV	Tory Horton 26–yard pass from Carson Strong (Brandon Talton kick) (10 plays, 78 yards, 5:09)	NEV 7–0
1	02:38	WYO	John Hoyland 27–yard field goal (5 plays, 16 yards, 1:23)	NEV 7–3
2	14:57	WYO	John Hoyland 36–yard field goal (5 plays, 51 yards, 1:44)	NEV 7–6
2	01:46	NEV	Cole Turner 50–yard pass from Carson Strong (Brandon Talton kick) (1 play, 50 yards, 0:08)	NEV 14–6
3	10:30	NEV	Avery Morrow 18–yard run (Brandon Talton kick) (9 plays, 94 yards, 4:26)	NEV 21–6
3	03:47	NEV	Cole Turner 10–yard pass from Carson Strong (Brandon Talton kick) (10 plays, 66 yards, 5:05)	NEV 28–6
3	02:50	WYO	Levi Williams 21–yard run (John Hoyland kick) (3 plays, 65 yards, 0:57)	NEV 28–13
4	13:13	WYO	Gunner Gentry 22–yard pass from Levi Williams (John Hoyland kick) (8 plays, 65 yards, 3:32)	NEV 28–20
4	08:30	WYO	Levi Williams 8–yard run (Treyton Welch pass) (6 plays, 59 yards, 2:56)	TIE 28–28
4	03:26	NEV	Brandon Talton 21–yard field goal (4 plays, 5 yards, 1:44)	NEV 31–28
4	00:23	WYO	John Hoyland 42–yard field goal (11 plays, 74 yards, 1:07)	TIE 31–31
OT	15:00	WYO	John Hoyland 38–yard field goal (4 plays, 4 yards, 0:00)	WYO 34–31
OT	15:00	NEV	Romeo Doubs 9–yard pass from Carson Strong (4 plays, 25 yards, 0:00)	NEV 37–34

Statistics	Wyoming	Nevada
First downs	19	25
Total yards	361	496
Rushing yards	128	76
Passing yards	233	420
Turnovers	0	4
Time of possession	25:02	34:58

Team	Category	Player	Statistics
Wyoming	Passing	Levi Williams	16/31, 227 yards, 1 TD, 1 INT
Wyoming	Rushing	Xazavian Valladay	22 carries, 87 yards
Wyoming	Receiving	Isaiah Neyor	3 receptions, 102 yards
Nevada	Passing	Carson Strong	39/52, 420 yards, 4 TDs
Nevada	Rushing	Devonte Lee	18 carries, 65 yards
Nevada	Receiving	Cole Turner	7 receptions, 119 yards, 2 TDs

=== At UNLV ===
Nevada at UNLV
(Battle for the Fremont Cannon / Silver State Series)

Team	1	2	3	4	Total
• Wolf Pack	10	14	3	10	37
Rebels	3	9	7	0	19

- Date: October 31, 2020
- Location: Allegiant Stadium
  Paradise, NV
- Game start: 7:47 p.m. PDT
- Elapsed time: 3 hours and 19 minutes
- Game attendance: 2,000
- Game weather: Temperature: 73 °F (23 °C) • Weather: Indoor • Wind: Indoor
- Referee: Stephen Baron
- TV announcers (FS1): Alex Faust (play–by–play) and Petros Papadakis (analyst)

Scoring summary
1	10:47	NEV	Brandon Talton 32–yard field goal (10 plays, 60 yards, 4:13)	NEV 3–0
1	07:37	UNLV	Daniel Gutierrez 36–yard field goal (8 plays, 46 yards, 3:04)	TIE 3–3
1	04:33	NEV	Devonte Lee 1–yard run (Brandon Talton kick) (4 plays, 45 yards, 2:46)	NEV 10–3
2	14:06	UNLV	Daniel Gutierrez 31–yard field goal (13 plays, 61 yards, 5:27)	NEV 10–6
2	13:55	NEV	Romeo Doubs 65–yard pass from Carson Strong (Brandon Talton kick) (1 play, 65 yards, 0:11)	NEV 17–6
2	02:20	UNLV	Tyleek Collins 1–yard pass from Max Gilliam (pass failed) (11 plays, 81 yards, 4:19)	NEV 17–12
2	00:15	NEV	Justin Lockhart 4–yard pass from Carson Strong (Brandon Talton kick) (7 plays, 75 yards, 1:59)	NEV 24–12
3	08:36	NEV	Brandon Talton 26–yard field goal (8 plays, 55 yards, 3:06)	NEV 27–12
3	02:06	UNLV	Steve Jenkins 5–yard pass from Max Gilliam (Daniel Gutierrez kick) (14 plays, 86 yards, 6:25)	NEV 27–19
4	13:37	NEV	Toa Taua 4–yard run (Brandon Talton kick) (6 plays, 70 yards, 3:19)	NEV 34–19
4	02:27	NEV	Brandon Talton 34–yard field goal (9 plays, 64 yards, 5:06)	NEV 37–19

Statistics	Nevada	UNLV
First downs	22	22
Total yards	497	348
Rushing yards	147	126
Passing yards	350	222
Turnovers	0	0
Time of possession	27:36	32:24

Team	Category	Player	Statistics
Nevada	Passing	Carson Strong	21/27, 350 yards, 2 TDs
Nevada	Rushing	Toa Taua	12 carries, 86 yards, 1 TD
Nevada	Receiving	Romeo Doubs	7 receptions, 219 yards, 1 TD
UNLV	Passing	Max Gilliam	27/40, 207 yards, 2 TDs
UNLV	Rushing	Charles Williams	19 carries, 99 yards
UNLV	Receiving	Tyleek Collins	5 receptions, 74 yards, 1 TD

=== Utah State ===
Utah State at Nevada

Team	1	2	3	4	Total
Aggies	9	0	0	0	9
• Wolf Pack	7	14	10	3	34

- Date: November 5, 2020
- Location: Mackay Stadium
  Reno, NV
- Game start: 4:00 p.m. PST
- Elapsed time: 3 hours and 27 minutes
- Game attendance: 250
- Game weather: Temperature: 70 °F (21 °C) • Weather: Clear and Sunny • Wind: N/A
- Referee: Cal McNeill
- TV announcers (FS1): Alex Faust (play–by–play) and Evan Moore (analyst)

Scoring summary
1	11:12	USU	A.J. Vongphachanh 5–yard safety	USU 2–0
1	05:32	USU	Justin McGriff 4–yard pass from Jason Shelley (Connor Coles kick) (8 plays, 61 yards, 2:53)	USU 9–0
1	01:38	NEV	Romeo Doubs 42–yard pass from Carson Strong (Brandon Talton kick) (6 plays, 74 yards, 3:48)	USU 9–7
2	11:06	NEV	Romeo Doubs 3–yard pass from Carson Strong (Brandon Talton kick) (11 plays, 64 yards, 3:48)	NEV 14–9
2	06:54	NEV	Romeo Roubs 54–yard pass from Carson Strong (Brandon Talton kick) (6 plays, 81 yards, 2:20)	NEV 21–9
3	11:30	NEV	Toa Taua 15–yard run (Brandon Talton kick) (6 plays, 77 yards, 2:33)	NEV 28–9
3	02:03	NEV	Brandon Talton 36–yard field goal (8 plays, 71 yards, 3:54)	NEV 31–9
4	09:45	NEV	Brandon Talton 26–yard field goal (14 plays, 63 yards, 6:23)	NEV 34–9

Statistics	Utah State	Nevada
First downs	11	27
Total yards	210	542
Rushing yards	109	121
Passing yards	101	421
Turnovers	0	1
Time of possession	23:16	36:44

Team	Category	Player	Statistics
Utah State	Passing	Jason Shelley	15/27, 96 yards, 1 TD
Utah State	Rushing	Jason Shelley	7 carries, 34 yards
Utah State	Receiving	Deven Thompkins	6 receptions, 30 yards
Nevada	Passing	Carson Strong	36/52, 411 yards, 3 TDs
Nevada	Rushing	Toa Taua	12 carries, 107 yards, 1 TD
Nevada	Receiving	Romeo Doubs	7 receptions, 137 yards, 3 TDs

=== At New Mexico ===
Nevada at New Mexico
(Battle of the Wolves)

Team	1	2	3	4	Total
• Wolf Pack	0	10	10	7	27
Lobos	7	6	0	7	20

- Date: November 14, 2020
- Location: Sam Boyd Stadium
  Whitney, NV
- Game start: 3:35 p.m. PST
- Elapsed time: 3 hours and 15 minutes
- Game attendance: 250
- Game weather: Temperature: 66 °F (19 °C) • Weather: Sunny • Wind: None
- Referee: Michael VanderVelde
- TV announcers (FS2): Anthony LaPanta (play–by–play) and Ron Johnson (analyst)

Scoring summary
1	00:08	NM	Trae Hall 16–yard pass from Bryson Carroll (George Steinkamp kick) (6 plays, 55 yards, 2:37)	NM 7–0
2	12:09	NM	George Steinkamp 26–yard field goal (7 plays, 44 yards, 2:57)	NM 10–0
2	03:41	NEV	Brandon Talton 28–yard field goal (8 plays, 38 yards, 4:13)	NM 10–3
2	03:21	NEV	Romeo Doubs 33–yard pass from Carson Strong (Brandon Talton kick) (1 play, 33 yards, 0:08)	TIE 10–10
2	01:04	NM	George Steinkamp 48–yard field goal (5 plays, 14 yards, 0:59)	NM 13–10
3	10:09	NEV	Brandon Talton 34–yard field goal (11 plays, 53 yards, 4:44)	TIE 13–13
3	04:36	NEV	Romeo Doubs 61–yard pass from Carson Strong (Brandon Talton kick) (4 plays, 82 yards, 1:24)	NEV 20–13
4	06:47	NEV	Romeo Doubs 59–yard pass from Carson Strong (Brandon Talton kick) (5 plays, 81 yards, 2:23)	NEV 27–13
4	04:02	NM	Bobby Cole 1–yard run (George Steinkamp kick) (7 plays, 61 yards, 2:37)	NEV 27–20

Statistics	Nevada	New Mexico
First downs	19	21
Total yards	392	352
Rushing yards	52	141
Passing yards	340	211
Turnovers	2	0
Time of possession	27:45	32:15

Team	Category	Player	Statistics
Nevada	Passing	Carson Strong	24/38, 336 yards, 3 TDs, 1 INT
Nevada	Rushing	Toa Taua	15 carries, 62 yards
Nevada	Receiving	Romeo Doubs	5 receptions, 172 yards, 3 TDs
New Mexico	Passing	Trae Hall	17/32, 195 yards, 1 INT
New Mexico	Rushing	Bobby Cole	17 carries, 90 yards, 1 TD
New Mexico	Receiving	Emmanuel Logan–Greene	5 receptions, 56 yards

=== San Diego State ===
San Diego State at Nevada

Team	1	2	3	4	Total
Aztecs	7	14	0	0	21
• Wolf Pack	6	10	10	0	26

- Date: November 21, 2020
- Location: Mackay Stadium
  Reno, NV
- Game start: 12:35 p.m. PST
- Elapsed time: 2 hours and 35 minutes
- Game attendance: 50
- Game weather: Temperature: 47 °F (8 °C) • Weather: Clear Skies • Wind: N/A
- Referee: Timothy Davis
- TV announcers (CBS): Brad Nessler (play–by–play), Gary Danielson (analyst) and Jamie Erdahl (sideline)

Scoring summary
1	08:37	NEV	Brandon Talton 31–yard field goal (9 plays, 29 yards, 3:23)	NEV 3–0
1	07:33	SDSU	Lucas Johnson 35–yard run (Matt Araiza kick) (4 plays, 75 yards, 1:04)	SDSU 7–3
1	02:36	NEV	Brandon Talton 33–yard field goal (9 plays, 59 yards, 4:57)	SDSU 7–6
2	14:57	SDSU	Kobe Smith 7–yard pass from Lucas Johnson (Matt Araiza kick) (7 plays, 75 yards, 2:39)	SDSU 14–6
2	09:55	NEV	Brandon Talton 22–yard field goal (12 plays, 70 yards, 5:02)	SDSU 14–9
2	04:15	NEV	Cole Turner 2–yard pass from Carson Strong (Brandon Talton kick) (8 plays, 86 yards, 3:19)	NEV 16–14
2	01:15	SDSU	Greg Bell 2–yard run (Matt Araiza kick) (6 plays, 64 yards, 2:54)	SDSU 21–16
3	10:42	NEV	Romeo Doubs 50–yard pass from Carson Strong (Brandon Talton kick) (7 plays, 70 yards, 2:57)	NEV 23–21
3	02:17	NEV	Brandon Talton 27–yard field goal (7 plays, 24 yards, 3:46)	NEV 26–21

Statistics	San Diego State	Nevada
First downs	16	19
Total yards	293	376
Rushing yards	109	88
Passing yards	184	288
Turnovers	1	1
Time of possession	27:07	32:53

Team	Category	Player	Statistics
San Diego State	Passing	Lucas Johnson	14/24, 184 yards, 1 TD
San Diego State	Rushing	Chance Bell	11 carries, 42 yards
San Diego State	Receiving	Jesse Matthews	5 receptions, 80 yards
Nevada	Passing	Carson Strong	31/46, 288 yards, 2 TDs, 1 INT
Nevada	Rushing	Toa Taua	13 carries, 52 yards
Nevada	Receiving	Romeo Doubs	5 receptions, 133 yards, 1 TD

=== At Hawaii ===
Nevada at Hawaii

Team	1	2	3	4	Total
Wolf Pack	0	7	0	14	21
• Rainbow Warriors	0	10	7	7	24

- Date: November 28, 2020
- Location: Aloha Stadium
  Halawa, HI
- Game start: 6:06 p.m.
- Elapsed time: 2 hours and 54 minutes
- Game attendance: 0
- Game weather: Temperature: 77 °F (25 °C) • Weather: 62% Humidity • Wind: NE 10 MPH
- Referee: Christian Watson
- TV announcers (KNSN-TV/SPEC HI): Robert Kekaula (play–by–play) and Rich Miano (analyst)

Scoring summary
2	10:11	UH	Matthew Shipley 31–yard field goal (14 plays, 80 yards, 5:29)	UH 3–0
2	02:57	NEV	Cole Turner 4–yard pass from Carson Strong (Brandon Talton kick) (13 plays, 81 yards, 7:08)	NEV 7–3
2	00:59	UH	Calvin Turner 7–yard pass from Chevan Cordeiro (Matthew Shipley kick) (8 plays, 75 yards, 1:58)	UH 10–7
3	03:20	UH	Miles Reed 4–yard run (Matthew Shipley kick) (10 plays, 99 yards, 4:02)	UH 17–7
4	14:28	NEV	Toa Taua 1–yard run (Brandon Talton kick) (9 plays, 75 yards, 3:52)	UH 17–14
4	09:31	UH	Chevan Cordeiro 2–yard run (Matthew Shipley kick) (14 plays, 75 yards, 4:57)	UH 24–14
4	05:38	NEV	Tory Horton 18–yard pass from Carson Strong (Brandon Talton kick) (10 plays, 75 yards, 3:53)	UH 24–21

Statistics	Nevada	Hawaii
First downs	23	25
Total yards	376	365
Rushing yards	208	119
Passing yards	168	246
Turnovers	1	1
Time of possession	32:07	27:53

Team	Category	Player	Statistics
Nevada	Passing	Carson Strong	20/25, 168 yards, 2 TDs
Nevada	Rushing	Toa Taua	20 carries, 131 yards, 1 TD
Nevada	Receiving	Cole Turner	6 receptions, 48 yards, 1 TD
Hawaii	Passing	Chevan Cordeiro	26/32, 246 yards, 1 TD
Hawaii	Rushing	Chevan Cordeiro	15 carries, 62 yards, 1 TD
Hawaii	Receiving	Calvin Turner	10 receptions, 77 yards, 1 TD

=== Fresno State ===
Fresno State at Nevada

Team	1	2	3	4	Total
Bulldogs	7	13	0	6	26
• Wolf Pack	17	7	0	13	37

- Date: December 5, 2020
- Location: Mackay Stadium
  Reno, NV
- Game start: 6:10 p.m. PST
- Elapsed time: 3 hours and 56 minutes
- Game attendance: 50
- Game weather: Temperature: 50 °F (10 °C) • Weather: Cold and Overcast • Wind: N/A
- Referee: Cal McNeill
- TV announcers (FS2): Anthony LaPanta (play–by–play) and Ron Johnson (analyst)

Scoring summary
1	11:34	NEV	Brandon Talton 49–yard field goal (7 plays, 38 yards, 3:26)	NEV 3–0
1	08:05	FS	Josh Kelly 9–yard run (Mac Dalena kick) (8 plays, 77 yards, 3:23)	FS 7–3
1	05:12	NEV	Cole Turner 5–yard pass from Carson Strong (Brandon Talton kick) (4 plays, 40 yards, 1:00)	NEV 10–7
1	03:30	NEV	Cole Turner 2–yard pass from Carson Strong (Brandon Talton kick) (3 plays, 21 yards, 1:19)	NEV 17–7
2	12:03	FS	Jake Haener 3–yard run (Mac Dalena kick) (16 plays, 75 yards, 6:27)	NEV 17–14
2	09:14	NEV	Tory Horton 17–yard pass from Carson Strong (Brandon Talton kick) (6 plays, 59 yards, 2:43)	NEV 24–14
2	01:32	FS	Keric Wheatfall 19–yard pass from Jake Haener (Mac Dalena kick failed) (4 plays, 58 yards, 1:00)	NEV 24–20
4	13:42	NEV	Tory Horton 85–yard pass from Carson Strong (Brandon Talton kick failed) (3 plays, 85 yards, 0:57)	NEV 30–20
4	05:32	NEV	Tory Horton 32–yard pass from Carson Strong (Brandon Talton kick) (5 plays, 65 yards, 2:40)	NEV 37–20
4	01:39	FS	Zane Pope 21–yard pass from Jake Haener (Mac Dalena kick failed) (12 plays, 75 yards, 3:53)	NEV 37–26

Statistics	Fresno State	Nevada
First downs	30	14
Total yards	599	416
Rushing yards	114	62
Passing yards	485	354
Turnovers	5	3
Time of possession	35:01	24:59

Team	Category	Player	Statistics
Fresno State	Passing	Jake Haener	41/65, 485 yards, 2 TD
Fresno State	Rushing	Ronnie Rivers	14 carries, 69 yards
Fresno State	Receiving	Keric Wheatfall	6 receptions, 113 yards, 1 TD
Nevada	Passing	Carson Strong	23/39, 354 yards, 5 TDs, 2 INTs
Nevada	Rushing	Toa Taua	11 carries, 39 yards
Nevada	Receiving	Tory Horton	5 receptions, 148 yards, 3 TDs

=== Vs. San Jose State ===
Nevada vs. San Jose State

Team	1	2	3	4	Total
Wolf Pack	10	10	0	0	20
• Spartans	7	0	20	3	30

- Date: December 11, 2020
- Location: Sam Boyd Stadium
  Whitney, NV
- Game start: 7:35 p.m. PST
- Elapsed time: 3 hours and 13 minutes
- Game attendance: 0
- Game weather: Temperature: 47 °F (8 °C) • Weather: Clear • Wind: None
- Referee: Mike Cuttone
- TV announcers (CBSSN): Dave Ryan (play–by–play) and Randy Cross (analyst)

Scoring summary
1	09:25	NEV	Brandon Talton 42–yard field goal (5 plays, 55 yards, 1:53)	NEV 3–0
1	06:22	SJSU	Jermai Braddock 33–yard pass from Nick Starkel (Matt Mercurio kick) (6 plays, 73 yards, 2:59)	SJSU 7–3
1	01:10	NEV	Cole Turner 2–yard pass from Carson Strong (Brandon Talton kick) (12 plays, 65 yards, 5:12)	NEV 10–7
2	08:56	NEV	Brandon Talton 43–yard field goal (10 plays, 54 yards, 4:53)	NEV 13–7
2	07:06	NEV	Devonte Lee 1–yard run (Brandon Talton kick) (2 plays, 8 yards, 0:40)	NEV 20–7
3	14:46	SJSU	Shamar Garrett 98–yard kickoff return (Matt Mercurio kick)	NEV 20–14
3	02:34	SJSU	Derrick Deese Jr. 5–yard pass from Nick Starkel (Matt Mercurio kick) (12 plays, 99 yards, 6:12)	SJSU 21–20
3	00:25	SJSU	Tyler Nevens 69–yard run (Nick Nash rush failed) (1 play, 69 yards, 0:11)	SJSU 27–20
4	09:35	SJSU	Matt Mercurio 27–yard field goal (9 plays, 77 yards, 3:33)	SJSU 30–20

Statistics	Nevada	San Jose State
First downs	24	18
Total yards	398	506
Rushing yards	138	200
Passing yards	260	306
Turnovers	4	1
Time of possession	31:43	28:17

Team	Category	Player	Statistics
Nevada	Passing	Carson Strong	33/48, 260 yards, 1 TD
Nevada	Rushing	Toa Taua	11 carries, 96 yards
Nevada	Receiving	Romeo Doubs	9 receptions, 75 yards
San Jose State	Passing	Nick Starkel	20/30, 306 yards, 2 TDs, 1 INT
San Jose State	Rushing	Tyler Nevens	12 carries, 184 yards, 1 TD
San Jose State	Receiving	Bailey Gaither	7 receptions, 156 yards

=== Vs. Tulane (Famous Idaho Potato Bowl) ===
Nevada vs. Tulane
(Famous Idaho Potato Bowl)

Team	1	2	3	4	Total
Green Wave	0	7	13	7	27
• Wolf Pack	6	20	0	12	38

- Date: December 22, 2020
- Location: Albertsons Stadium
  Boise, ID
- Game start: 1:30 p.m. MST
- Elapsed time: 3 hours and 23 minutes
- Game attendance: 0
- Game weather: Temperature: 40 °F (4 °C) • Weather: Partly Cloudy • Wind: WNW 22 MPH
- Referee: Steve Strimling
- TV announcers (ESPN): Chris Cotter (play–by–play), Mark Herzlich (analyst) and Taylor Davis (sideline)

Scoring summary
1	04:58	NEV	Cole Turner 11–yard pass from Carson Strong (Brandon Talton kick failed) (2 plays, 8 yards, 0:43)	NEV 6–0
2	14:52	NEV	Justin Lockhart 23–yard pass from Carson Strong (Brandon Talton kick) (7 plays, 71 yards, 3:15)	NEV 13–0
2	12:42	NEV	Toa Taua 44–yard pass from Carson Strong (pass failed) (3 plays, 55 yards, 1:18)	NEV 19–0
2	10:38	TULN	Jha'Quan Jackson 41–yard pass from Michael Pratt (Merek Glover kick) (6 plays, 60 yards, 2:04)	NEV 19–7
2	07:44	NEV	Toa Taua 50–yard run (Brandon Talton kick) (8 plays, 82 yards, 2:48)	NEV 26–7
3	10:03	TULN	Michael Pratt 6–yard run (pass failed) (12 plays, 75 yards, 4:57)	NEV 26–13
3	06:30	TULN	Jha'Quan Jackson 28–yard pass from Michael Pratt (Merek Glover kick) (4 plays, 45 yards, 1:16)	NEV 26–20
4	13:22	NEV	Cole Turner 2–yard pass from Carson Strong (pass failed) (3 plays, 20 yards, 1:21)	NEV 32–20
4	04:19	NEV	Jamaal Bell 21–yard pass from Carson Strong (Brandon Talton kick failed) (6 plays, 87 yards, 2:21)	NEV 38–20
4	00:07	TULN	Cameron Carroll 65–yard run (Merek Glover kick) (1 play, 80 yards, 0:10)	NEV 38–27

Statistics	Tulane	Nevada
First downs	18	21
Total yards	365	480
Rushing yards	197	209
Passing yards	168	271
Turnovers	0	1
Time of possession	23:50	36:10

Team	Category	Player	Statistics
Tulane	Passing	Michael Pratt	12/25, 168 yards, 2 TDs, 3 INTs
Tulane	Rushing	Cameron Carroll	10 carries, 120 yards, 1 TD
Tulane	Receiving	Jha'Quan Jackson	2 receptions, 69 yards, 2 TDs
Nevada	Passing	Carson Strong	22/28, 271 yards, 5 TDs
Nevada	Rushing	Devonte Lee	18 carries, 105 yards
Nevada	Receiving	Toa Taua	6 receptions, 77 yards, 1 TD
