= 2020 Mountain West Conference football season =

- League: NCAA Division I FBS
- Sport: Football
- Duration: October 24-December 19
- Teams: 12
- TV partner(s): CBS Sports Family (CBS, CBSSN, CBS All Access), Fox Sports Family (Fox, FS1, FS2), Stadium, ATTSN

2021 NFL Draft
- Top draft pick: CB Darren Hall, San Diego State
- Picked by: Atlanta Falcons, 108th overall

Regular season
- Season champions: San Jose State
- Runners-up: Boise State

Championship Game
- Champions: San Jose State
- Runners-up: Boise State

Seasons
- 2019 2021

2020 Mountain West Conference football standings
	Conf.			Overall
Team	W		L	W		L
No. 24 San Jose State y$	6	–	0	7	–	1
Boise State y	5	–	0	5	–	2
Nevada	6	–	2	7	–	2
San Diego State	4	–	2	4	–	4
Hawaii	4	–	4	5	–	4
Fresno State	3	–	3	3	–	3
Air Force	2	–	2	3	–	3
Wyoming	2	–	4	2	–	4
New Mexico	2	–	5	2	–	5
Colorado State	1	–	3	1	–	3
Utah State	1	–	5	1	–	5
UNLV	0	–	6	0	–	6
Championship: San Jose State 34, Boise State 20
$ – Conference champion; y – Championship game participant; Note: Due to COVID-19, the Mountain West suspended the season, but later decided to begin play on October 24.; Rankings from AP Poll

The 2020 Mountain West Conference football season, part of that year's NCAA Division I FBS football season, is the 22nd season of college football for the Mountain West Conference (MW). Since 2012, 12 teams have competed in the MW football conference.

On August 10, 2020, the conference suspended all fall sports competitions due to the COVID-19 pandemic.

The season was scheduled to begin on September 3, 2020 and end on November 28, 2020. The Mountain West football Conference Championship Game was to be played on December 5, 2020. The entire schedule was released on February 27, 2020.

On September 24, 2020, the conference resumed Football, and is working on resuming other fall sports competitions. The Conference's amended regular-season schedule will begin on Saturday, Oct. 24, with the intent to play eight games. The MW Football Championship Game is slated for Saturday, Dec. 19. The new Mountain West schedule was released October 1.

== Preseason ==
=== Potential COVID-19 disruption ===
On May 12, 2020, California State University system chancellor Timothy White announced that all of its 23 campuses would hold essentially all classes in the 2020 fall term online. This in turn raised serious questions whether its member campuses—three of which (Fresno State, San Diego State, and San Jose State) are MW members—would be able to field teams in fall sports, including football, in light of statements by NCAA president Mark Emmert made on that organization's Twitter account on May 8:

All of the [conference] commissioners and every [school] president that I've talked to is in clear agreement: If you don't have students on campus, you don't have student-athletes on campus. That doesn't mean [the school] has to be up and running in the full normal model, but you have to treat the health and well-being of the athletes at least as much as the regular students. ... If a school doesn't reopen, then they're not going to be playing sports. It's really that simple.

No decision on football at any of the CSU institutions has been made. However, on the same day that the CSU chancellor made his remarks, the California Collegiate Athletic Association (CCAA), an NCAA Division II non-football league whose members are all CSU campuses, publicly announced that it had canceled its 2020 fall sports season. (Note: While the cited story states that the CCAA has 13 schools, only 12 will be members in the 2020–21 school year. The only CCAA member in 2019–20 that was not a CSU campus, UC San Diego, joins the Division I Big West Conference on July 1, 2020.)

=== Mountain West Media ===
The Mountain West Media days will be held at the Cosmopolitan July 28 and 29.

=== Preseason Poll ===
The Preseason Poll will be released in August 2020.

== Rankings ==
		Pre	Wk 2	Wk 3	Wk 4	Wk 5	Wk 6	Wk 7	Wk 8	Wk 9	Wk 10	Wk 11	Wk 12	Wk 13	Wk 14	Wk 15	Wk 16	Final
Air Force	AP	RV	RV			RV	RV	RV										
Air Force	C	RV		RV		RV	RV	RV										
Air Force	CFP	Not released																
Boise State	AP	RV							25	21	RV	RV	RV	RV	RV	RV		
Boise State	C	RV				RV	RV	RV	RV	23	RV	RV	RV	RV	RV	RV	RV	
Boise State	CFP	Not released																
Colorado State	AP																	
Colorado State	C																	
Colorado State	CFP	Not released																
Fresno State	AP																	
Fresno State	C																	
Fresno State	CFP	Not released																
Hawaii	AP																	
Hawaii	C																	
Hawaii	CFP	Not released																
Nevada	AP										RV	RV	RV		RV			
Nevada	C									RV	RV	RV	RV	RV	RV	RV	RV	
Nevada	CFP	Not released																
New Mexico	AP																	
New Mexico	C																	
New Mexico	CFP	Not released																
San Diego State	AP								RV	RV								
San Diego State	C									RV								
San Diego State	CFP	Not released																
San Jose State	AP											RV	RV	RV	RV	25	19	
San Jose State	C										RV	RV	RV	RV	RV	25	20	
San Jose State	CFP	Not released														24	22	
UNLV	AP																	
UNLV	C																	
UNLV	CFP	Not released																
Utah State	AP																	
Utah State	C																	
Utah State	CFP	Not released																
Wyoming	AP																	
Wyoming	C																	
Wyoming	CFP	Not released																

Legend
	Improvement in ranking
	Drop in ranking
	Not ranked previous week
	No change in ranking from previous week
RV	Received votes but were not ranked in Top 25 of poll
т	Tied with team above or below also with this symbol

== Coaches ==
=== Coaching changes ===
There were six coaching changes for Mountain West football programs for the 2020 season. New Mexico head coach Bob Davie resigned on November 25 and was replaced by Arizona State defensive coordinator Danny Gonzales on December 17. Later that same day UNLV head coach Tony Sanchez also resigned and he was replaced by Oregon offensive coordinator Marcus Arroyo On December 11. Colorado State's Mike Bobo resigned on December 4 and was replaced by former Boston College head coach Steve Addazio. Fresno State head coach Jeff Tedford resigned on December 5 and was replaced on December 17 by Indiana offensive coordinator and former Fresno State assistant Kalen DeBoer. On January 8, San Diego State head coach Rocky Long announced his retirement from coaching and was replaced that same day by Aztecs defensive line coach and former head coach Brady Hoke. The final coaching change took place on January 14, when Hawaii head coach Nick Rolovich resigned to accept the head coaching position at Washington State and was replaced by ex-Arizona State head coach Todd Graham On January 21.

=== Head coaches ===
Team	Head coach	Years At School	Overall record	Record at school	MW record
Air Force	Troy Calhoun	14	98–69	98–69	59–45
Boise State	Bryan Harsin	7	69–22	61–15	40–8
Colorado State	Steve Addazio	1	57–55	0–0	0–0
Fresno State	Kalen DeBoer	1	0–0	0–0	0–0
Hawaii	Todd Graham	1	95–61	0–0	0–0
Nevada	Jay Norvell	4	15–21	15–21	12–12
New Mexico	Danny Gonzales	1	0–0	0–0	0–0
San Diego State	Brady Hoke	3	78–72	13–13	7–9
San Jose State	Brent Brennan	4	8–29	8–29	4–21
UNLV	Marcus Arroyo	1	0–0	0–0	0–0
Utah State	Gary Andersen	6	63–67	38–31	41–25
Wyoming	Craig Bohl	7	140–72	36–39	23–25

== Schedule ==
The season began on October 3, 2020 and will end on December 19, 2020.

=== Regular season ===
Index to colors and formatting
Mountain West Member won
Mountain West Member lost
Mountain West teams in **bold**

==== Week One ====
Date	Time	Visiting team	Home team	Site	TV	Result	Attendance	Ref.
October 3	4:00 p.m.	Navy	**Air Force**	Falcon Stadium • Colorado Springs, CO (Commander-in-Chief's Trophy)	CBSSN	**W** 40–7	5,000	
^{#}Rankings from AP Poll released prior to game. All times are in Mountain Time.

==== Week Two ====
Date	Time	Visiting team	Home team	Site	TV	Result	Attendance	Ref.
October 24	5:00 p.m.	Utah State	Boise State	Albertsons Stadium • Boise, ID	FS1	**BSU** 42–13	0	
October 24	5:00 p.m.	Wyoming	Nevada	Mackay Stadium • Revo, NV	CBSSN	**NEV** 37–34 ^{OT}	250	
October 24	5:30 p.m.	Hawaii	Fresno State	Bulldog Stadium • Fresno, CA (rivalry)	KSEE/Spectrum OC16	**HAW** 34–19	0	
October 24	7:00 p.m.	New Mexico	Colorado State	Canvas Stadium • Fort Collins, CO	FS2	cancelled	n/a	
October 24	8:30 p.m.	UNLV	San Diego State	Dignity Health Sports Park • Carson, CA	CBSSN	**SDSU** 34–6	0	
October 24	8:30 p.m.	Air Force	San Jose State	CEFCU Stadium • San Jose, CA	FS1	**SJSU** 17–6	0	
^{#}Rankings from AP Poll released prior to game. All times are in Mountain Time.

==== Week Three ====
Date	Time	Visiting team	Home team	Site	TV	Result	Attendance	Ref.
October 29	8:00 p.m.	Colorado State	Fresno State	Bulldog Stadium • Fresno, CA	CBSSN	**FRES** 38–17	0	
October 30	7:45 p.m.	Hawaii	Wyoming	War Memorial Stadium • Laramie, WY	FS1	**WYO** 31–7	6,232	
October 31	4:00 p.m.	No. 25 Boise State	Air Force	Falcon Stadium • Colorado Springs, CO	CBSSN	**BSU** 49–30	500	
October 31	5:00 p.m.	New Mexico	San Jose State	CEFCU Stadium • San Jose, CA	FS1	**SJSU** 38–21	0	
October 31	7:30 p.m.	San Diego State	Utah State	Maverik Stadium • Logan, UT	CBSSN	**SDSU** 38–7	5,116	
October 31	8:30 p.m.	Nevada	UNLV	Allegiant Stadium • Las Vegas, NV (Fremont Cannon)	FS1	**NEV** 37–19	2,000	
^{#}Rankings from AP Poll released prior to game. All times are in Mountain Time.

==== Week Four ====
Date	Time	Visiting team	Home team	Site	TV	Result	Attendance	Ref.
November 5	5:00 p.m.	**Utah State**	**Nevada**	Mackay Stadium • Reno, NV	FS1	**NEV** 34–9	250	
November 5	7:00 p.m.	**Wyoming**	**Colorado State**	Canvas Stadium • Fort Collins, CO (Border War)	CBSSN	**CSU** 34–24	0	
November 6	7:00 p.m.	**San Jose State**	**San Diego State**	Dignity Health Sports Park • Carson, CA	CBSSN	**SJSU** 28–17	0	
November 6	7:45 p.m.	No. 9 BYU	**No. 21 Boise State**	Albertsons Stadium • Boise, ID	FS1	**L** 17–51	1,100	
November 7	9:30 a.m.	**Air Force**	Army	Mitchie Stadium • West Point, NY (Commander-in-Chief's Trophy)	CBS	postponed	n/a	
November 7	1:30 p.m.	**Fresno State**	**UNLV**	Allegiant Stadium • Las Vegas, NV	CBSSN	**FRES** 40–27	2,000	
November 7	9:00 p.m.	**New Mexico**	**Hawaii**	Aloha Stadium • Honolulu, HI	Spectrum OC16	**HAW** 39–33	0	
^{#}Rankings from AP Poll released prior to game. All times are in Mountain Time.

==== Week Five ====
Date	Time	Visiting team	Home team	Site	TV	Result	Attendance	Ref.
November 12	6:00 p.m.	Colorado State	Boise State	Albertsons Stadium • Boise, ID	FS1	**BSU** 52–21	1,100	
November 14	12:30 p.m.	Fresno State	Utah State	Maverik Stadium • Logan, UT	FS2	**FRES** 35–16	0	
November 14	2:00 p.m.	Hawaii	San Diego State	Dignity Health Sports Park • Carson, CA	Spectrum OC16	**SDSU** 34–10	0	
November 14	4:30 p.m.	Nevada	New Mexico	Sam Boyd Stadium • Whitney, NV	FS2	**NEV** 27–20	250	
November 14	8:00 p.m.	Air Force	Wyoming	War Memorial Stadium • Laramie, WY	CBSSN	cancelled	n/a	
November 14	8:30 p.m.	UNLV	San Jose State	CEFCU Stadium • San Jose, CA	FS2	**SJSU** 34–17	0	
^{#}Rankings from AP Poll released prior to game. All times are in Mountain Time.

==== Week Six ====
Date	Time	Visiting team	Home team	Site	TV	Result	Attendance	Ref.
November 19	7:00 p.m.	Utah State	Wyoming	War Memorial Stadium • Laramie, WY (Bridger's Battle)	CBSSN	cancelled	n/a	
November 20	7:30 p.m.	New Mexico	Air Force	Falcon Stadium • Colorado Springs, CO	FS1	**AF** 28–0	100	
November 21	1:30 p.m.	San Diego State	Nevada	Mackay Stadium • Reno, NV	CBS	**NEV** 26–21	50	
November 21	3:30 p.m.	UNLV	Colorado State	Canvas Stadium • Fort Collins, CO	FS2	cancelled	n/a	
November 21	5:00 p.m.	San Jose State	Fresno State	Bulldog Stadium • Fresno, CA (Valley Trophy)	CBSSN	cancelled	n/a	
November 21	9:00 p.m.	Boise State	Hawaii	Aloha Stadium • Honolulu, HI	CBSSN	**BSU** 40–32	0	
^{#}Rankings from AP Poll released prior to game. All times are in Mountain Time.

==== Week Seven ====
Date	Time	Visiting team	Home team	Site	TV	Result	Attendance	Ref.
November 26	12:00 p.m.	Colorado State	**Air Force**	Falcon Stadium • Colorado Springs, CO (Ram-Falcon Trophy)	CBSSN	cancelled	n/a	
November 26	5:00 p.m.	New Mexico	**Utah State**	Maverik Stadium • Logan, UT	FS1	**USU** 41–27	198	
November 27	2:00 p.m.	Wyoming	**UNLV**	Allegiant Stadium • Las Vegas, NV	FS1	**WYO** 45–14	0	
November 27	7:00 p.m.	San Diego State	**Fresno State**	Bulldog Stadium • Fresno, CA (Battle for the Oil Can)	FS1	cancelled	n/a	
November 28	2:00 p.m.	San Jose State	**Boise State**	Albertsons Stadium • Boise, ID	FOX	cancelled	n/a	
November 28	3:37 p.m.	San Diego State	Colorado	Folsom Field • Boulder, CO	PAC-12	**L** 10–20	0	
November 28	9:00 p.m.	Nevada	**Hawaii**	Aloha Stadium • Honolulu, HI	Spectrum OC16	**HAW** 24–21	0	
^{#}Rankings from AP Poll released prior to game. All times are in Mountain Time.

==== Week Eight ====
Date	Time	Visiting team	Home team	Site	TV	Result	Attendance	Ref.
December 3	7:30 p.m.	Air Force	Utah State	Maverik Stadium • Logan, UT	CBSSN	**AF** 35–7	3,025	
December 4	7:30 p.m.	Boise State	UNLV	Allegiant Stadium • Las Vegas, NV	CBSSN	cancelled	n/a	
December 5	4:00 p.m.	San Jose State	Hawaii	Aloha Stadium • Honolulu, HI	Spectrum OC16	**SJSU** 35–24	0	
December 5	5:00 p.m.	Colorado State	San Diego State	Dignity Health Sports Park • Carson, CA	CBSSN	**SDSU** 29–17	0	
December 5	8:30 p.m.	Fresno State	Nevada	Mackay Stadium • Reno, NV	FS1	**NEV** 37–26	0	
December 5	8:30 p.m.	Wyoming	New Mexico	Sam Boyd Stadium • Whitney, NV	CBSSN	**UNM** 17–16	0	
^{#}Rankings from AP Poll released prior to game. All times are in Mountain Time.

==== Week Nine ====
Date	Time	Visiting team	Home team	Site	TV	Result	Attendance	Ref.
December 11	8:00 p.m.	Nevada	**San Jose State**	Sam Boyd Stadium • Whitney, NV	CBSSN	**SJSU** 30–20	0	
December 12	4:00 p.m.	Boise State	**Wyoming**	War Memorial Stadium • Laramie, WY	CBSSN	**BSU** 17–9	2,978	
December 12	7:30 p.m.	Utah State	**Colorado State**	Canvas Stadium • Fort Collins, CO	CBSSN	cancelled	n/a	
December 12	8:00 p.m.	San Diego State	No. 14 BYU	LaVell Edwards Stadium • Provo, UT	ESPN2	**L** 14–28	1,099	
December 12	8:30 p.m.	Fresno State	**New Mexico**	Sam Boyd Stadium • Whitney, NV	FS1	**UNM** 49–39	0	
December 12	9:00 p.m.	UNLV	**Hawaii**	Aloha Stadium • Honolulu, HI	Spectrum OC16	**HAW** 38–21	0	
^{#}Rankings from AP Poll released prior to game. All times are in Mountain Time.

==== Week Ten ====
Date	Time	Visiting team	Home team	Site	TV	Result	Attendance	Ref.
December 19	1:00 p.m.	**Air Force**	Army	Michie Stadium • West Point, NY (Commander-in-Chief's Trophy)	CBSSN	**L** 7–10		
^{#}Rankings from AP Poll released prior to game. All times are in Mountain Time.

==== Championship Game ====
Date	Time	Visiting team	Home team	Site	TV	Result	Attendance	Ref.
December 19	2:15 p.m.	**Boise State**	No. 25 **San Jose State**	Sam Boyd Stadium • Whitney, NV	FOX	**SJSU** 34–20	0	
^{#}Rankings from AP Poll released prior to game. All times are in Mountain Time.

==== Canceled regular season games ====
The following non-conference games were canceled due to the COVID-19 pandemic:

Aug. 29

- Idaho State at New Mexico
- Hawaii at Arizona

- UC Davis at Nevada
- California at UNLV

Sep. 3

- Washington State at Utah State

Sept. 5

- Duquesne at Air Force
- Georgia Southern at Boise State
- New Mexico at Mississippi State
- UCLA at Hawaii

- Colorado at Colorado State
- Weber State at Wyoming
- Idaho State at Fresno State
- Nevada at Arkansas

- Sacramento State at San Diego State
- San Jose State at Central Michigan
- Louisiana Tech at UNLV

Sept. 12

- Arizona State at UNLV
- New Mexico at USC
- Fresno State at Colorado
- Southern Utah at Utah State

- Wyoming at Louisiana
- Fordham at Hawaii
- UTEP at Nevada

- Colorado State at Oregon State
- San Diego State at Toledo
- UC Davis at San Jose State

Sept. 19

- Air Force at Purdue
- Florida State at Boise State
- Northern Colorado at Colorado State
- UCLA at San Diego State

- New Mexico at New Mexico State
- Utah at Wyoming
- Hawaii at Oregon
- San Jose State at Penn State

- Nevada at South Florida
- Utah State at Washington
- UNLV at Iowa State

Sep. 26

- Boise State at Marshall

- Colorado State at Vanderbilt

- Wyoming at Ball State

Oct. 2

- Utah State at BYU

Oct. 3

- UMass at New Mexico

Oct. 10

- Fresno State at Texas A&M

- New Mexico State at Hawaii

Oct. 17

- New Mexico State at Fresno State

Nov. 14

- UConn at San Jose State

== Postseason ==
=== Bowl Games ===
Legend
Mountain West win
Mountain West loss

Bowl game	Date	Site	Television	Time (MST)	Mountain West team	Opponent	Score	Attendance
Famous Idaho Potato Bowl	December 22	Albertsons Stadium • Boise, ID	ESPN	1:30 p.m.	**Nevada**	Tulane	**W** 38–27	0
New Mexico Bowl	December 24	Toyota Stadium • Frisco, TX	ESPN	1:30 p.m.	**Hawaii**	Houston	**W** 28–14	2,060
Arizona Bowl	December 31	Arizona Stadium • Tucson, AZ	CBS	12:00 p.m.	**San Jose State**	Ball State	**L** 13–34	0

Rankings are from AP rankings. All times Mountain Time Zone. Mountain West teams shown in bold.

== Awards and honors ==
=== Player of the week Honors ===
Week	Offensive			Defensive			Special Teams		
Week	Player	Team	Position	Player	Team	Position	Player	Team	Position
Week 1 (October 26)	Carson Strong	Nevada	QB	Caden McDonald	San Diego State	LB	John Hoyland	Wyoming	K
Week 2 (November 2)	Nick Starkel	San Jose State	QB	Charles Hicks	Wyoming	LB	Avery Williams	Boise State	KR
Week 3 (November 9)	Ronnie Rivers	Fresno State	RB	Tre Jenkins	San Jose State	S	Brandon Talton	Nevada	K
Week 4 (November 16)	Jalen Cropper	Fresno State	WR	Cade Hall	San Jose State	DL	Avery Williams	Boise State	KR
Week 5 (November 23)	Brad Roberts	Air Force	FB	Dom Peterson	Nevada	DT	Julian Diaz	Nevada	P
Week 6 (November 30)	Andrew Peasley	Utah State	QB	Nick Heninger	Utah State	LB	Connor Coles	Utah State	K
Week 7 (December 7)	Carson Strong	Nevada	QB	Brandon Shook	New Mexico	LB	Jordan Byrd	San Diego State	KR
Week 8 (December 14)	Isaiah Chavez	New Mexico	QB	Darius Muasau	Hawaii	LB	Shamar Garrett	San Jose State	KR

=== Mountain West Individual Awards ===
The following individuals received postseason honors as voted by the Mountain West Conference football coaches at the end of the season

Award	Player	School
Offensive Player of the Year	Carson Strong, QB	Nevada
Defensive Player of the Year	Cade Hall Jr., DL	San Jose State
Special Teams Player of the Year	Avery Williams, Ret.	Boise State
Freshman of the Year	Kyle Williams, WR	UNLV
Coach of the Year	Brent Brennan	San Jose State

=== All-conference teams ===
Position	Player	Team
**First Team Offense**
WR	Khalil Shakir	Boise State
WR	Romeo Doubs	Nevada
WR	Bailey Gaither	San Jose State
OL	Parker Ferguson	Air Force
OL	Nolan Laufenberg	Air Force
OL	Kyle Spalding	San Diego State
OL	Jack Snyder	San Jose State
OL	Keegan Cryder	Wyoming
TE	Cole Turner	Nevada
QB	Carson Strong	Nevada
RB	Ronnie Rivers	Fresno State
RB	Xazavian Valladay	Wyoming
KR	Avery Williams	Boise State
PK	Brandon Talton	Nevada
**First Team Defense**
DL	Scott Patchan	Colorado State
DL	Cameron Thomas	San Diego State
DL	Cade Hall	San Jose State
DL	Viliami Fehoko	San Jose State
LB	Darius Muasau	Hawaii
LB	Caden McDonald	San Diego State
LB	Kyle Harmon	San Jose State
LB	Chad Muma	Wyoming
DB	Avery Williams	Boise State
DB	Jerrick Reed	New Mexico
DB	Darren Hall	San Diego State
DB	Tariq Thompson	San Diego State
PR	Avery Williams	Boise State
P	Ryan Stonehouse	Colorado State

Position	Player	Team
**Second Team Offense**
WR	Dante Wright	Colorado State
WR	Calvin Turner	Hawaii
WR	Tre Walker	San Jose State
OL	John Ojukwu	Boise State
OL	Jake Stetz	Boise State
OL	Syrus Tuitele	Fresno State
OL	Aaron Frost	Nevada
OL	Zachary Thomas	San Diego State
TE	Trey McBride	Colorado State
QB	Nick Starkel	San Jose State
RB	Toa Taua	Nevada
RB	Greg Bell	San Diego State
KR	Jordan Byrd	San Diego State
PK	John Hoyland	Wyoming
**Second Team Defense**
DL	Shane Irwin	Boise State
DL	David Perales	Fresno State
DL	Dom Peterson	Nevada
DL	Sam Hammond	Nevada
LB	Riley Whimpey	Boise State
LB	Dequan Jackson	Colorado State
LB	Lawson Hall	Nevada
LB	Brandon Shook	New Mexico
DB	Kekaula Kaniho	Boise State
DB	Jalen Walker	Boise State
DB	Cortez Davis	Hawaii
DB	Tre Jenkins	San Jose State
PR	Romeo Doubs	Nevada
P	Tanner Kuljian	San Diego State

Ref:

=== All-Americans ===
The 2020 College Football All-America Teams are composed of the following College Football All-American first teams chosen by the following selector organizations: Associated Press (AP), Football Writers Association of America (FWAA), American Football Coaches Association (AFCA), Walter Camp Foundation (WCFF), The Sporting News (TSN), Sports Illustrated (SI), USA Today (USAT) ESPN, CBS Sports (CBS), FOX Sports (FOX) College Football News (CFN), Bleacher Report (BR), Scout.com, Phil Steele (PS), SB Nation (SB), Athlon Sports, Pro Football Focus (PFF) and Yahoo! Sports (Yahoo!).

Currently, the NCAA compiles consensus all-America teams in the sports of Division I-FBS football and Division I men's basketball using a point system computed from All-America teams named by coaches associations or media sources. The system consists of three points for a first-team honor, two points for second-team honor, and one point for third-team honor. Honorable mention and fourth team or lower recognitions are not accorded any points. Football consensus teams are compiled by position and the player accumulating the most points at each position is named first team consensus all-American. Currently, the NCAA recognizes All-Americans selected by the AP, AFCA, FWAA, TSN, and the WCFF to determine Consensus and Unanimous All-Americans. Any player named to the First Team by all five of the NCAA-recognized selectors is deemed a Unanimous All-American.

Position	Player	School	Selector	Unanimous	Consensus
**First Team All-Americans**
DL	Cade Hall	San Jose State	**TSN**		
AP/RS	Avery Williams	Boise State	**AFCA**, **FWAA**, **TSN**, USAT		*

Position	Player	School	Selector	Unanimous	Consensus
**Second Team All-Americans**
DL	Cade Hall	San Jose State	USAT		
RS	Avery Williams	Boise State	CBS		

Position	Player	School	Selector	Unanimous	Consensus
**Third Team All-Americans**
AP	Avery Williams	Boise State	**AP**		

== Home game attendance ==
TBA

== NFL draft ==
The following list includes all Mountain West players who were drafted in the 2021 NFL draft.

Player	Position	School	Draft Round	Round Pick	Overall Pick	Team
Darren Hall	CB	San Diego State	4	3	108	Atlanta Falcons
John Bates	TE	Boise State	4	19	124	Washington Football Team
Avery Williams	CB	Boise State	5	39	183	Atlanta Falcons
