= 2020 Famous Idaho Potato Bowl =

The 2020 Famous Idaho Potato Bowl may refer to:

- 2020 Famous Idaho Potato Bowl (January) – a bowl game following the 2019 season, played between Ohio and Nevada on January 3, 2020
- 2020 Famous Idaho Potato Bowl (December) – a bowl game following the 2020 season, played between Tulane and Nevada on December 22, 2020
