= Carson Strong =

American football player (born 1999)

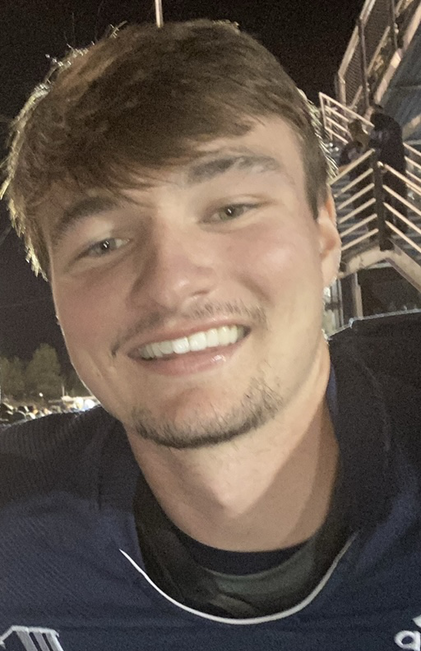
- Strong in 2021

Northern State Wolves
- Title: Quarterbacks coach

Personal information
- Born: September 14, 1999 (age 27); Vacaville, California, U.S.
- Listed height: 6 ft 3 in (1.91 m)
- Listed weight: 226 lb (103 kg)

Career information
- Position: Quarterback (No. 12)
- High school: Will C. Wood (Vacaville)
- College: Nevada (2018–2021)
- NFL draft: 2022: undrafted

Career history

Playing
- Philadelphia Eagles (2022)*; Arizona Cardinals (2022)*; Michigan Panthers (2023)
- * Offseason or practice squad member only

Coaching
- Nevada (2023) Assistant coach; Reno High School (2024) Offensive coordinator; Colorado State (2025) Assistant quarterback coach; Northern State (2026–present) Quarterbacks coach

Awards and highlights
- 2× MW Offensive Player of the Year (2020, 2021); 2× First-team All-MW (2020, 2021)

Career USFL statistics
- TD–INT: 1–2
- Passing yards: 266
- Completion percentage: 63.3
- Passer rating: 67.2
- Stats at Pro Football Reference

Carson Brown Strong (born September 14, 1999) is an American former football quarterback. He was signed as an undrafted free agent by the Philadelphia Eagles in 2022, and was also a member of the Arizona Cardinals and Michigan Panthers. He played college football at Nevada.

== Early life ==
Strong was born on September 14, 1999, in Vacaville, California. He later attended Will C. Wood High School, where he passed for 2,732 yards and 26 touchdowns as a junior. He did not play his senior season due to a knee injury. In June 2017, Strong announced his commitment to play college football at the University of Nevada, Reno. Nevada was Strong's only FBS offer despite being a three-star recruit.

== College career ==
Strong made his debut at Nevada against Portland State in August 2018, where he rushed for 4 yards in the 72–19 win. He redshirted his first year at Nevada. Strong was named the starting quarterback for the 2019 season. In 10 starts, he completed 237 of 374 passes for 2,335 yards with 11 touchdowns and seven interceptions.

He returned as a starter in 2020. Despite a shortened season due to the COVID-19 pandemic, Strong and the Wolf Pack finished with a 7–2 record and won against Tulane in the 2020 Famous Idaho Potato Bowl. Strong started 9 games that season, completing 249 of 355 passes for 2,858 yards, 27 touchdowns and 4 interceptions, winning the Mountain West Conference Offensive Player of the Year award.

In 2021, Strong led the Wolf Pack to an 8–4 record in his best season at Nevada. Strong completed 366 of 522 passes for 4,175 passing yards, 36 touchdowns and 8 interceptions, winning the Mountain West Offensive Player of the Year award again and becoming the fifth player in conference history to win the award in back-to-back years. On December 14, 2021, Strong announced his intention to opt-out of the 2021 Quick Lane Bowl and to declare for the 2022 NFL draft.

== Professional career ==
Pre-draft measurables
Height	Weight	Arm length	Hand span	Wingspan	Wonderlic
6 ft 3 3/8 in (1.91 m)	226 lb (103 kg)	32 in (0.81 m)	9 1/8 in (0.23 m)	6 ft 4 in (1.93 m)	22
All values from NFL Combine

=== Philadelphia Eagles ===
On April 30, 2022, Strong signed an undrafted free-agent deal with the Philadelphia Eagles. It included a $20,000 signing bonus and $300,000 base guarantee. He was released on August 30.

=== Arizona Cardinals ===
On December 13, 2022, Strong was signed to the practice squad of the Arizona Cardinals. He was released one week later.

=== Michigan Panthers ===
On March 19, 2023, Strong signed with the Michigan Panthers of the United States Football League (USFL). He was placed on injured reserve on May 16, 2023. He was not part of the roster after the 2024 UFL dispersal draft on January 15, 2024, and was waived on January 29. Two days later, Strong announced his retirement from playing, citing recurrent knee issues.

== Career statistics ==
=== USFL ===
Year	Team	Games		Passing							
Year	Team	GP	GS	Cmp	Att	Pct	Yds	Y/A	TD	Int	Rtg
2023	MICH	4	0	31	49	63.3	266	5.4	1	2	67.2

=== College ===
Season	Games			Passing							Rushing			
Season	GP	GS	Record	Cmp	Att	Pct	Yds	TD	Int	Rtg	Att	Yds	Avg	TD
2018	1	0	—	0	0	0.0	0	0	0	0.0	1	4	4.0	0
2019	10	9	5–4	237	374	63.4	2,335	11	7	121.8	54	6	0.9	0
2020	9	9	7–2	249	355	70.1	2,858	27	4	160.6	33	95	2.9	0
2021	12	12	8–4	366	523	70.0	4,175	36	8	156.8	51	208	4.1	0
Career	32	30	20–10	853	1,253	68.1	9,379	74	19	147.5	139	305	2.2	0

== Coaching career ==
On July 21, 2023, Strong joined Colorado State University's coaching staff under Jay Norvell as a volunteer assistant.

A week after starting at Colorado State, Strong joined his alma mater Nevada's coaching staff as an assistant coach.
