= 2021 Quick Lane Bowl =

Postseason college football bowl game

- 7th Quick Lane Bowl
Western Michigan Broncos	Nevada Wolf Pack
(7–5)	(8–4)
MAC	MWC
52	24
Head coach: Tim Lester	Head coach: Vai Taua (interim)
	1	2	3	4	Total
Western Michigan	14	17	7	14	52
Nevada	3	7	7	7	24
- Date: December 27, 2021
- Season: 2021
- Stadium: Ford Field
- Location: Detroit, Michigan
- MVP: Sean Tyler (RB, Western Michigan)
- Favorite: Western Michigan by 7
- Referee: Edwin Lee (AAC)
- Attendance: 22,321

United States TV coverage
- Network: ESPN
- Announcers: Bill Roth (play-by-play), Dustin Fox (analyst), and Taylor McGregor (sideline)

The 2021 Quick Lane Bowl was a college football bowl game played on December 27, 2021, with kickoff at 11:00 a.m. EST, televised on ESPN. It was the 7th edition of the Quick Lane Bowl (after the 2020 edition was cancelled due to the COVID-19 pandemic), and was one of the 2021–22 bowl games concluding the 2021 FBS football season. The game's title sponsor was Quick Lane Tire and auto centers.

== Teams ==
While the bowl had tie-ins with the Mid-American Conference (MAC) and the Big Ten Conference, the actual participants were from the MAC and Mountain West Conference (MWC). This was the first time that Western Michigan and Nevada ever played each other.

=== Western Michigan Broncos ===
Western Michigan finished its regular season with a 7–5 record (4–4 in MAC games). The Broncos won four of their first five games, then lost four of their final six. The team was 1-1 in games against ranked opponents, with a loss to #2 Michigan, and a shocking win over #12 Pitt.

=== Nevada Wolf Pack ===
Nevada finished their regular season with an 8–4 record (5–3 in Mountain West games). The Wolf Pack played to a 5–1 record in their first six games, then went 3–3 in their final six games. The team played one ranked opponent, losing by two points to San Diego State in mid-November. Following the regular season, head coach Jay Norvell, offensive coordinator Matt Mumme, and multiple other coaches left the Nevada program to take jobs at Colorado State. The team was coached by running backs/interim head coach Vai Taua.

Starting quarterback Carson Strong, who won back-to-back Mountain West Conference Offensive Player of the Year awards in 2020 and 2021, opted out of the game in order to prepare for the 2022 NFL draft. Multiple other athletes, including starting wide receivers Tory Horton and Melquan Stovall, transferred to Colorado State to remain with Norvell and did not play in the game.

== Game summary ==
2021 Quick Lane Bowl

Quarter	1	2	3	4	Total
Western Michigan	14	17	7	14	52
Nevada	3	7	7	7	24

at Ford Field • Detroit, Michigan

- Date: Monday, December 27, 2021
- Game time: 11:00 a.m. EST
- Game weather: n/a (game played indoors)
- Game attendance: 22,321
- Referee: Edwin Lee
- TV announcers (ESPN): Bill Roth (play-by-play), Dustin Fox (analyst), and Taylor McGregor (sideline)
- Box score

Scoring summary

Quarter	Time	Drive			Team	Scoring information	Score	
Quarter	Time	Plays	Yards	TOP	Team	Scoring information	WMU	NEV
1	10:17	9	67	4:43	Nevada	32-yard field goal by Brandon Talton	0	3
1	10:04				Western Michigan	Sean Tyler 100-yard kickoff return for touchdown, Parker Sampson kick good	7	3
1	6:31	6	95	2:39	Western Michigan	Corey Crooms 74-yard touchdown reception from Kaleb Eleby, Parker Sampson kick good	14	3
2	14:15	10	72	5:37	Western Michigan	22-yard field goal by Parker Sampson	17	3
2	11:15	7	57	2:54	Nevada	Devonte Lee 1-yard touchdown run, Brandon Talton kick good	17	10
2	7:48	7	63	3:20	Western Michigan	Brett Borske 20-yard touchdown reception from Kaleb Eleby, Parker Sampson kick good	24	10
2	2:01	8	72	3:43	Western Michigan	Jaxson Kincaide 7-yard touchdown run, Parker Sampson kick good	31	10
3	12:27	5	75	2:33	Western Michigan	Kaleb Eleby 1-yard touchdown run, Parker Sampson kick good	38	10
3	1:33	9	70	5:30	Nevada	Toa Taua 1-yard touchdown run, Brandon Talton kick good	38	17
4	8:57	9	61	4:25	Western Michigan	Jaxson Kincaide 7-yard touchdown run, Parker Sampson kick good	45	17
4	5:05	8	66	3:52	Nevada	Jamaal Bell 18-yard touchdown reception from Nate Cox, Brandon Talton kick good	45	24
4	1:36	8	48	3:29	Western Michigan	Trae Allen 3-yard touchdown run, Parker Sampson kick good	52	24
"TOP" = time of possession. For other American football terms, see Glossary of American football.								

=== Statistics ===
Statistics	WMU	NEV
First downs	23	16
Plays–yards	66–514	54–242
Rushes–yards	52–352	31–121
Passing yards	162	121
Passing: comp–att–int	8–14–1	12–23–1
Time of possession	32:32	27:28

Team	Category	Player	Statistics
Western Michigan	Passing	Kaleb Eleby	8/14, 162 yards, 2 TD, 1 INT
Western Michigan	Rushing	Sean Tyler	14 carries, 146 yards
Western Michigan	Receiving	Corey Crooms	1 reception, 74 yards, 1 TD
Nevada	Passing	Nate Cox	12/23, 121 yards, 1 TD, 1 INT
Nevada	Rushing	Devonte Lee	7 carries, 85 yards, 1 TD
Nevada	Receiving	Jamaal Bell	7 receptions, 75 yards, 1 TD

== Externals links ==
- Game statistics at statbroadcast.com
