= Merritt Norvell =

American athletics administrator (1941–2020)

Biographical details
- Born: February 12, 1941
- Died: October 19, 2020 (aged 79); Lansing, Michigan, U.S.

Playing career
- 1960–1962: Wisconsin
- Position: Halfback

Administrative career (AD unless noted)
- 1995–1998: Michigan State

Merritt James Norvell Jr. (February 12, 1941 – October 19, 2020) was an American college athletics administrator. He served as the athletic director at Michigan State University from 1995 to 1998.

Norvell attended Jacksonville High School in Jacksonville, Illinois, where he starred in four sports. He moved on to the University of Wisconsin–Madison, where he played college football for the Wisconsin Badgers as a halfback and was a member of the 1962 Wisconsin Badgers football team that played in the 1963 Rose Bowl.

Norvell died on October 19, 2020, in Lansing, Michigan. Norvell's son, Jay Norvell, is a football coach and former player.
