= Elijah Cooks =

American football player (born 1998)

Profile
- Position: Wide receiver

Personal information
- Born: October 13, 1998 (age 28); Santa Maria, California, U.S.
- Listed height: 6 ft 4 in (1.93 m)
- Listed weight: 215 lb (98 kg)

Career information
- High school: Atascadero (Atascadero, California)
- College: Nevada (2017–2021); San Jose State (2022)
- NFL draft: 2023: undrafted

Career history
- Jacksonville Jaguars (2023–2024); Philadelphia Eagles (2024–2025)*; New Orleans Saints (2025)*; Birmingham Stallions (2026); Carolina Panthers (2026)*
- * Offseason or practice squad member only

Awards and highlights
- First-team All-MW (2022)

Career NFL statistics as of 2024
- Receptions: 3
- Receiving yards: 38
- Stats at Pro Football Reference

Elijah Stephen Cooks (born October 13, 1998) is an American professional football wide receiver. He played college football for the Nevada Wolf Pack before transferring to the San Jose State Spartans and was signed as an undrafted free agent by the Jaguars after the 2023 NFL draft.

== Early life ==
Born in Santa Maria, California, Cooks grew up there and initially attended St. Joseph High School, where he played football and basketball. Midway through his tenth grade year, Cooks moved to Atascadero and transferred to Atascadero High School.

As a senior at Atascadero in 2016, Cooks tallied 56 catches for 966 yards and 15 touchdowns, winning the Pac 5 Offensive Player of the Year award.

== College career ==
=== Nevada ===
Cooks committed to play football for the University of Nevada at Reno on February 1, 2017. He chose Nevada over Hawaii, Wyoming, Fresno State, and San Jose State, the team he later played for.

In five seasons at Nevada from 2017 to 2021, Cooks had 115 receptions for 1,478 yards and 18 touchdowns. Having played 35 games from 2017 to 2019, Cooks sat out all of 2020 due to a shoulder injury. In 2021, Cooks played in three games before a season-ending injury.

Cooks also briefly joined the Nevada Wolf Pack men's basketball team in the 2017–18 season as a temporary replacement for an injured player. Cooks played four games, averaging one minute per game.

=== San Jose State ===
After five years at Nevada, Cooks transferred to San Jose State University as a graduate student.[1] During his time at San Jose State, he recorded his most statistically productive season and was named to the All–Mountain West first team.

=== College statistics ===
Year	Team	Games		Receiving				Rushing		
Year	Team	GP	Rec	Yds	Avg	TD	Att	Yds	Avg	TD
2017	Nevada	2	2	23	11.5	0	0	0	0	0
2018	Nevada	11	22	348	15.8	6	1	40	40	1
2019	Nevada	13	76	926	12.2	8	0	0	0	0
2020	Nevada	1	2	24	12.0	0	0	0	0	0
2021	Nevada	3	13	157	12.1	4	0	0	0	0
2022	San Jose State	12	69	1076	15.6	10	0	0	0	0
Career		42	184	2554	13.9	28	1	40	40.0	1

== Professional career ==
Pre-draft measurables
Height	Weight	Arm length	Hand span	Wingspan	40-yard dash	10-yard split	20-yard split	20-yard shuttle	Three-cone drill	Vertical jump	Broad jump	Bench press
6 ft 3 3/4 in (1.92 m)	219 lb (99 kg)	33 in (0.84 m)	9 1/2 in (0.24 m)	6 ft 8 in (2.03 m)	4.51 s	1.62 s	2.65 s	4.25 s	7.10 s	37.5 in (0.95 m)	10 ft 3 in (3.12 m)	16 reps
All values from Pro Day

=== Jacksonville Jaguars ===
After not being drafted in the 2023 NFL draft, Cooks signed with the Jacksonville Jaguars as an undrafted free agent on May 1, 2023. On August 29, the Jaguars announced that he had made the initial 53-man roster.

On August 27, 2024, Cooks was waived by the Jaguars and re-signed to the practice squad.

=== Philadelphia Eagles ===
On January 14, 2025, the Philadelphia Eagles signed Cooks to their practice squad. He signed a reserve/future contract with Philadelphia on February 14.

On August 26, 2025, Cooks was waived by the Eagles as part of final roster cuts and re-signed to the practice squad the next day. He was released on September 8.

=== New Orleans Saints ===
On December 18, 2025, Cooks was signed to the New Orleans Saints' practice squad. He signed a reserve/future contract with New Orleans on January 5, 2026. On April 27, Cooks was waived by the Saints.

=== Birmingham Stallions ===
On May 5, 2026, Cooks signed with the Birmingham Stallions of the United Football League (UFL).

=== Carolina Panthers ===
On August 4, 2026, Cooks signed with the Carolina Panthers. He was waived by the Panthers on August 29.
