= Thomas Sheffield =

American football coach (born 1987)

Current position
- Title: Associate head coach & special teams coordinator
- Team: Hawaii Rainbow Warriors
- Conference: Mountain West

Biographical details
- Born: July 29, 1987 (age 39); Waco, Texas, U.S.
- Education: Sam Houston State University

Coaching career (HC unless noted)
- 2011: Sam Houston State (OQC)
- 2012–2014: Mary Hardin-Baylor (TE)
- 2015–2016: North Texas (GA)
- 2017–2019: Arkansas-Pine Bluff (STC/TE)
- 2020–2021: Nevada (STC)
- 2022–present: Hawaii (AHC/STC)

Thomas Sheffield (born July 29, 1987) is an American football coach. He is currently the special teams coordinator at the University of Hawaii at Manoa. Previous stops include Sam Houston State University, the University of Mary Hardin-Baylor, the University of North Texas, the University of Arkansas at Pine Bluff, and the University of Nevada, Reno.

== Coaching career ==
=== Sam Houston State ===
Sheffield’s first coaching position was as an offensive quality control coach for head coach Willie Fritz at Sam Houston State while finishing up his bachelor’s degree in 2011. In his one year with his alma mater, Sheffield helped the Bearkats win the Southland Conference championship and reach the 2012 NCAA Division I Football Championship Game.

=== Mary Hardin-Baylor ===
From 2012 through 2014, Sheffield served as the tight ends coach and recruiting coordinator for legendary head coach Pete Fredenburg at Mary Hardin-Baylor. In his first two seasons with the NCAA Division III power, Sheffield helped lead the Crusaders to the Division III semifinals both years. UMHB had a 38-3 record in his three years.

In 2014, his star pupil, Eric Nelson, earned American Football Coaches Association First-Team All-America honors, after setting school records in receptions by a tight end, receiving yards by a tight end, and touchdown receptions by a tight end. He was the UMHB tight end to earned first team All-America honors.

=== North Texas ===
In 2015, Sheffield joined Dan McCarney’s staff at North Texas as an offensive/special teams graduate assistant. When McCarney was fired, Sheffield was retained by new head coach Seth Littrell. During his time at the Denton, Texas school, Sheffield worked closely with Mean Green special teams coordinator Tommy Perry.

=== Arkansas-Pine Bluff ===
Sheffield’s first full-time appointment at the division I level came in 2017 when he was hired by Monte Coleman as the tight ends coach and special teams coordinator at Arkansas-Pine Bluff. Coleman was fired after one season and Sheffield was retained by new head coach Cedric Thomas.

In 2017, Sheffield’s special teams unit improved dramatically from the previous season. His punt team was ranked third nationally in net punt, eighth in punt return defense, and punter Jamie Gillan finished the year eighth in the nation in punting average. All three were school records.

The following season, Sheffield continued to develop Gillan, also known as the Scottish Hammer, in to an NFL prospect. Though he didn’t play American football until he was already in high school, with Sheffield’s guidance Gillan earned first-team All-Southwestern Athletic Conference honors as both a punter and kicker. He would go on to play for the Cleveland Browns where he was named to the PFWA All-Rookie Team in 2019.

=== Nevada ===
In 2020, Sheffield was hired to his first full-time position by Jay Norvell. He was the special teams coordinator at Nevada in 2020 and 2021. When he was hired by Norvell, he replaced his former mentor at North Texas, Tommy Perry. During his Nevada tenure, three Wolf Pack members earned All-Mountain West Conference honors: return specialist Romeo Doubs, kicker Brandon Talton, and punter Julian Diaz. Sheffield guided the Wolf Pack special teams to rank ninth nationally in net punting in 2020, seventeenth nationally in punt returns in 2021, and blocked six kicks in his two seasons.

Sheffield really began to develop his own coaching mentality. He adopted the term “Ride or Die” as his mantra, going so far as to even getting a tattoo of the saying with a skull with an eye patch and flames coming out of it. It took five and a half hours, but it was worth it when he revealed it to the team before the season opener. His special teams units, which consist of players from every position group bought in to playing with the same mentality. He even made a deal with Norvell that he would where a Ride or Die patch on his practice shirts.

=== Hawaii ===
When Jay Norvell was hired as the new head coach at Colorado State, Sheffield followed him, but a short time later, Nevada/Colorado State wide receivers coach Timmy Chang was hired as the new head coach at Hawaii and he hired Sheffield as his associate head coach and special teams coordinator.

== Personal life ==
Sheffield and his wife (Emily) have three sons (Peyton Bear, Cannon, Carson) and a daughter (Blair).
