= Emany Johnson =

American football player (born 2000)

No. 50 – Cincinnati Bengals
- Position: Linebacker
- Roster status: Practice squad

Personal information
- Born: November 17, 2000 (age 25); Richmond, California, U.S.
- Listed height: 6 ft 2 in (1.88 m)
- Listed weight: 218 lb (99 kg)

Career information
- High school: Hercules (Hercules, California)
- College: Nevada (2018–2023)
- NFL draft: 2024: undrafted

Career history
- Dallas Cowboys (2024)*; Los Angeles Chargers (2024–2026)*; Cincinnati Bengals (2026–present)*
- * Offseason or practice squad member only

Awards and highlights
- First-team All-Mountain West (2023)
- Stats at Pro Football Reference

Emany Johnson (born November 17, 2000) is an American professional football linebacker for the Cincinnati Bengals of the National Football League (NFL). He played college football for the Nevada Wolf Pack.

== Early life ==
Johnson was born on November 17, 2000, in Richmond, California. He attended Hercules High School in Hercules, California.

== College career ==
Johnson played college football for the Nevada Wolf Pack from 2018 to 2023. He played in 55 games at Nevada, he had 195 tackles, including 5.5 for loss, three interceptions, nine pass break ups and a forced fumble as a defensive back. As a senior, Johnson earned first-team All-Mountain West honors.

== Professional career ==
Pre-draft measurables
Height	Weight	Arm length	Hand span	Wingspan	40-yard dash	10-yard split	20-yard split	20-yard shuttle	Three-cone drill	Vertical jump	Broad jump	Bench press
6 ft 2 in (1.88 m)	218 lb (99 kg)	31 1/4 in (0.79 m)	9 1/4 in (0.23 m)	6 ft 3 in (1.91 m)	4.52 s	1.54 s	2.56 s	4.28 s	6.99 s	38.5 in (0.98 m)	10 ft 5 in (3.18 m)	13 reps
All values from Pro Day

=== Dallas Cowboys ===
After going unselected in the 2024 NFL draft, Johnson signed with the Dallas Cowboys as an undrafted free agent. On August 27, he was released and signed to the practice squad the following day. On November 12, Johnson was released by the team.

=== Los Angeles Chargers ===
On November 20, 2024, Johnson was signed to the practice squad of the Los Angeles Chargers. On January 2, 2025, he was released. On January 14, Johnson signed a reserve/future contract with the Chargers. On August 26, he was released and signed to the practice squad the next day. On September 20, Johnson was elevated for the first time for the game against the Denver Broncos. He did not play any snaps and reverted to the practice squad on September 22. On January 13, 2026, Johnson signed a reserve/future contract with the team. On August 30, he was released.

=== Cincinnati Bengals ===
On October 20, 2026, the Cincinnati Bengals signed Johnson to the practice squad.
