= Daniel Grzesiak =

American gridiron football player (born 2000)

Profile
- Position: Defensive end

Personal information
- Born: November 19, 2000 (age 25); Los Angeles, California, U.S.
- Listed height: 6 ft 1 in (1.85 m)
- Listed weight: 245 lb (111 kg)

Career information
- High school: Crenshaw (Los Angeles)
- College: Nevada (2018–2021); Utah State (2022); Cincinnati (2023)
- NFL draft: 2024: undrafted

Career history
- Tampa Bay Buccaneers (2024–2025)*; Louisville Kings (2026); Calgary Stampeders (2026)
- * Offseason or practice squad member only

Awards and highlights
- UFL champion (2026)
- Stats at Pro Football Reference
- Stats at CFL.ca

Daniel Grzesiak (born November 19, 2000) is an American professional football defensive end. He played college football for the Nevada Wolf Pack, Utah State Aggies and Cincinnati Bearcats.

== Early life ==
Grzesiak was born on November 19, 2000, in Los Angeles, California. He attended Crenshaw High School in Los Angeles.

== College career ==
Grzesiak played college football for the Nevada Wolf Pack from 2018 to 2021, Utah State Aggies in 2022 and Cincinnati Bearcats in 2023. In 34 games at Nevada, he had 42 tackles, including 9.5 for loss, 7.5 sacks, one pass deflection, one forced fumble, one fumble recovery and a blocked kick.

At the end of the 2021 season, Grzesiak entered the transfer portal. On January 5, 2022 he committed to Utah State University. Grzesiak played 13 games for the Aggies, recording 52 tackles, including 13 for loss, 8.5 sacks, two pass deflections. two forced fumbles and one fumble recovery. He earned All-Mountain West honorable mention honors.

On December 29, Grzesiak entered the transfer portal again. On January 7, 2023, he committed to the University of Cincinnati. In 12 games, Grzesiak had 46 tackles, including 6.5 for loss, 3.5 sacks, three pass break ups, one forced fumble and fumble recovery.

== Professional career ==
Pre-draft measurables
Height	Weight	Arm length	Hand span	Wingspan	40-yard dash	10-yard split	20-yard split	20-yard shuttle	Three-cone drill	Vertical jump	Broad jump	Bench press
6 ft 0 in (1.83 m)	242 lb (110 kg)	32 5/8 in (0.83 m)	9 1/2 in (0.24 m)	6 ft 7 in (2.01 m)	4.59 s	1.60 s	2.72 s	4.34 s	7.28 s	35.5 in (0.90 m)	10 ft 5 in (3.18 m)	19 reps
All values from Pro day

=== Tampa Bay Buccaneers ===
After not being selected in the 2024 NFL draft, Grzesiak signed with the Tampa Bay Buccaneers of the National Football League (NFL) as an undrafted free agent. On August 27, he was released and signed to the practice squad. On December 31, Grzesiak was placed on the practice squad injured list. On January 14, 2025, he signed a reserve/future contract with the Buccaneers. On April 29, Grzesiak was released by the team.

=== Louisville Kings ===
On January 10, 2026, Grzesiak was selected by the Louisville Kings of the United Football League (UFL). In 12 games, he had 24 tackles, including four for loss and three sacks, as the team won the United Bowl.

=== Calgary Stampeders ===
On September 3, 2026, Grzesiak signed with the Calgary Stampeders of the Canadian Football League (CFL). On September 25, he was elevated to the active roster and made his CFL debut the following day against the Ottawa Redblacks where he had two special teams tackles. On October 1, Grzesiak reverted to the practice roster. On October 9, he was activated again in a depth role. He was released at the end of the season.
