= Brian Ward =

American football player and coach (born 1973)

Current position
- Title: Defensive coordinator
- Team: Arizona State
- Conference: Big 12

Biographical details
- Born: May 22, 1973 (age 53); Glendale, Arizona, U.S.

Playing career
- 1994–1996: McPherson

Coaching career (HC unless noted)
- 1997: McPherson (DC/ST)
- 1999–2000: Glendale (AZ) (DC/DB)
- 2001–2004: Wabash (AHC/DB/ST)
- 2005: Missouri Southern (AHC/co-DC/ST)
- 2006: Tulsa Union HS (OK) (AHC/DC)
- 2007–2009: McPherson
- 2010: North Dakota State (DB)
- 2011: Drake (DC/LB)
- 2012–2014: Western Illinois (DC/LB)
- 2015: Bowling Green (DC / LB / interim HC)
- 2016–2019: Syracuse (DC)
- 2020–2021: Nevada (DC)
- 2022: Washington State (DC)
- 2023–2025: Arizona State (DC/S)
- 2026-present: Arizona State (DC)

Head coaching record
- Overall: 17–15
- Bowls: 0–1
- Tournaments: 0–1 (NAIA playoffs)

Accomplishments and honors

Awards
- AFCA Division III Assistant Coach of the Year (2002)

Brian Patrick Ward (born May 22, 1973) is an American football coach and former player. He is the defensive coordinator at Arizona State University. Ward served as the head football coach at McPherson College in McPherson, Kansas from 2007 to 2009 and as the interim head football coach at Bowling Green State University for one game in 2015. As an assistant coach at Wabash College in 2002, he was named the AFCA Assistant Coach of the Year for NCAA Division III.

== Coaching career ==
Ward was the head football coach at McPherson College in McPherson, Kansas for three seasons, from 2007 to 2009, compiling a record of was 17–14.

Ward was named the 2009 College Fanz National Coach of the Year after taking his team to the NAIA Football National Championship playoffs for the first time in the history of the program.

After the 2021 season, Ward was hired by new Washington State head coach, Jake Dickert, to be the team's defensive coordinator.

After the 2022 season, Ward was hired by Kenny Dillingham at Arizona State University to be the team's defensive coordinator and safeties coach.

== Head coaching record ==
Year	Team	Overall	Conference	Standing	Bowl/playoffs	NAIA^{#}
McPherson Bulldogs (Kansas Collegiate Athletic Conference) (2007–2009)
2007	McPherson	4–6	3–6	T–7th		
2008	McPherson	4–6	3–6	7th		
2009	McPherson	9–2	8–1	2nd	L NAIA First Round	12
McPherson:		17–14	14–13			
Bowling Green Falcons (Mid-American Conference) (2015)
2015	Bowling Green	0–1 (Note: Dino Babers was Bowling Green's head coach for the team's first 13 games before stepping fown to become to head football coach at Syracuse University. Ward served as interim head coach for the GoDaddy Bowl. Bowling Green finished the season with an overall record of 10–4.)	0–0		L GoDaddy	
Bowling Green:		0–1	0–0			
Total:		17–15				
