= Jay Norvell =

American football player and coach (born 1963)

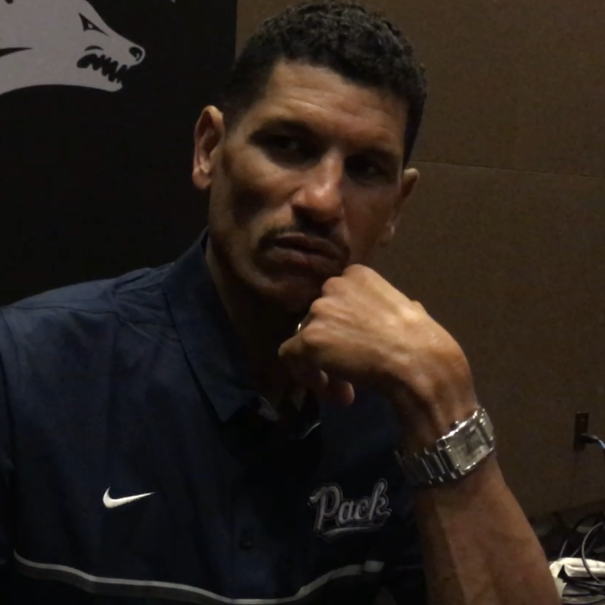
- Norvell at 2017 Mountain West media days

Current position
- Title: Running backs coach
- Team: Iowa
- Conference: Big Ten

Biographical details
- Born: March 28, 1963 (age 63); Madison, Wisconsin, U.S.

Playing career
- 1982–1985: Iowa
- 1986: Denver Broncos*
- 1987: Chicago Bears
- Positions: Defensive back, linebacker

Coaching career (HC unless noted)
- 1986–1987: Iowa (GA)
- 1988: Northern Iowa (WR)
- 1989–1994: Wisconsin (OL/WR/TE)
- 1995–1997: Iowa State (QB/WR)
- 1998–2001: Indianapolis Colts (WR)
- 2002–2003: Oakland Raiders (TE)
- 2004–2006: Nebraska (OC/QB)
- 2007: UCLA (OC/QB)
- 2008–2010: Oklahoma (assistant OC/WR)
- 2011–2014: Oklahoma (co-OC/WR)
- 2015: Texas (WR)
- 2016: Arizona State (PGC/WR)
- 2017–2021: Nevada
- 2022–2025: Colorado State
- 2026–present: Iowa (RB)

Head coaching record
- Overall: 51–52
- Bowls: 2–2

Accomplishments and honors

Awards
- First-team All-Big Ten (1985)

Merritt James Norvell III (born March 28, 1963) is an American college football coach and former player who is the running backs coach at the University of Iowa. He previously served as the head football coach at Colorado State University from 2022 to 2025. Norvell served as the head football coach at the University of Nevada, Reno from 2017 to 2021. His father, Merritt Norvell, was the athletic director at Michigan State University from 1995 to 1998.

== Playing career ==
Norvell played college football at the University of Iowa from 1982 to 1985 and professionally in the National Football League (NFL) as a linebacker with the Chicago Bears for one season, in 1987 as practice and replacement player.

== Coaching career ==
=== Early coaching career ===
His coaching career began at his alma mater Iowa in 1986 when Norvell took a job as a graduate assistant. From 1988 to 2001, Norvell served as an assistant coach for multiple positions at Northern Iowa, Wisconsin, and Iowa State. Norvell briefly spent time in the NFL as an assistant coach from 2002 to 2003 with the Indianapolis Colts and Oakland Raiders before returning to college football at the University of Nebraska–Lincoln to take his first ever offensive coordinator job in 2004. At Nebraska, he helped guide quarterback Zac Taylor to win Big 12 Offensive Player of the Year honors and break several school passing records.

Norvell spent a season as the offensive coordinator at UCLA in 2007, and then served as the assistant offensive coordinator and wide receivers coach at Oklahoma from 2008 to 2010 before being promoted to co-offensive coordinator and wide receivers coach in 2011. Norvell remained at Oklahoma until January 2015 when he was fired. He was subsequently hired as the wide receivers coach at the University of Texas where he held play calling duties. Norvell then spent the 2016 season as the wide receivers coach and passing game coordinator at Arizona State before landing his first head coaching job with Nevada in 2017.

=== Nevada ===
In 2017, Norvell was named head coach for the Nevada football program. The team struggled during Norvell's first year, going 3–9 in 2017. However, Norvell helped the team rebound the next season, with Nevada going 8–5 in 2018, including a 16–13 overtime victory in the 2018 Arizona Bowl over Arkansas State. Nevada posted winning records in 2019, 2020, and 2021 as well, and Norvell finished his tenure at Nevada recording a winning record in four of his five seasons. Norvell also led Nevada quarterback Carson Strong to back-to-back Mountain West Conference Offensive Player of the Year awards in 2020 and 2021. Norvell left Nevada to go to Colorado State.

=== Colorado State ===
On December 6, 2021, Colorado State hired Norvell to be their 24th head coach. Norvell's pass-heavy offensive style came as a stark contrast to previous head coach Steve Addazio's run-heavy smashmouth offense. Colorado State fired Norvell on October 19, 2025, midway through his fourth season. Norvell's record at Colorado State was 18–26, with one bowl appearance.

=== Iowa ===
In 2026, Norvell was hired as the running backs coach at the University of Iowa under head coach Kirk Ferentz.

== Personal life ==
Norvell's father, Merritt married his mother, Cynthia, who was a model, on July 4, 1962. Norvell has one brother, Aaron. His mother died at 79 after a battle with cancer. Norvell is Catholic.

== Head coaching record ==
Year	Team	Overall	Conference	Standing	Bowl/playoffs
Nevada Wolf Pack (Mountain West Conference) (2017–2021)
2017	Nevada	3–9	3–5	4th (West)	
2018	Nevada	8–5	5–3	T–2nd (West)	W Arizona
2019	Nevada	7–6	4–4	3rd (West)	L Famous Idaho Potato
2020	Nevada	7–2	6–2	2nd	W Famous Idaho Potato
2021	Nevada	8–4	5–3	3rd (West)	Quick Lane (Note: The team was coached by interim head coach Vai Taua for the 2021 Quick Lane Bowl as Norvell left the program prior to the game)
Nevada:		33–26	23–17		
Colorado State Rams (Mountain West Conference) (2022–2025)
2022	Colorado State	3–9	3–5	5th (Mountain)	
2023	Colorado State	5–7	3–5	T–8th	
2024	Colorado State	8–5	6–1	T–2nd	L Arizona
2025	Colorado State	2–5 (Note: Colorado State fired Norvell after seven games.)	1–2		
Colorado State:		18–26	13–13		
Total:		51–52			
