= Bakke Graduate University =

American-based private online university

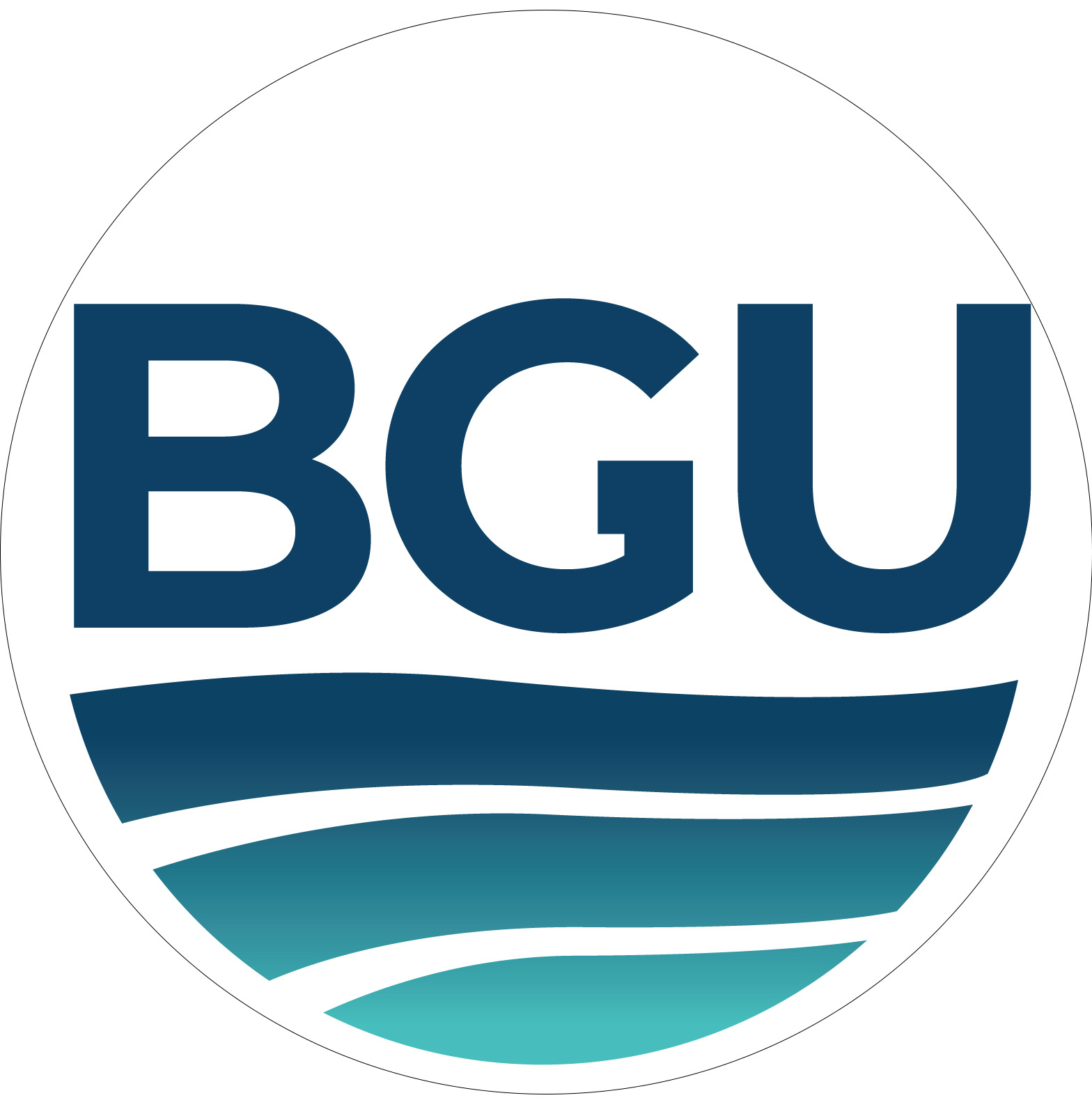
- Type: Private online graduate school
- Chancellor: Brad Smith
- President: Bryan McCabe
- Academic dean: Belete Mebratu
- Location: Dallas, Texas, United States; 32°53′39″N 96°45′14″W
- Website: www.bgu.edu

Bakke Graduate University (BGU) is a private online graduate school headquartered in Dallas, Texas. It has students, faculty, alumni, and courses in over 60 countries focused on urban studies, sustainable business, and Christian theology.

The university is composed of three colleges:

- a college of Christian theology focusing on global Christian movements
- a college of urban studies studying relief, development and advocacy in cities
- a college of business, including a global MBA for sustainable business entrepreneurship

Students often serve in business, government, NGO, or churches with roles as pastors, consultants, authors, urban ministers, professors or justice activists. Over 70% of BGU's faculty, students and alumni are located outside of North America with concentrations in Africa, Asia, Central America, the Caribbean, Europe, and South America. Students are not required to relocate from their home cities except for occasional two week-long city immersions in various global cities or mentored events.

== History ==
BGU was founded by a global network originally started by Billy Graham in the early 1970s called the Lausanne Committee for World Evangelization (LCWE). As a result, BGU begin in the early 2000s with an already globally distributed student body and faculty network in over 50 countries. A value statement BGU adapted from LCWE is “The Whole World, the Whole City, the Whole Church, the Whole Gospel and the Whole Person.” BGU's founders also included leaders from the World Evangelical Alliance, Leadership Foundations, World Vision and local Seattle and Tacoma urban leaders.

The original name proposed for BGU in 2003 by naming consultants was “Paradox University” reflecting the difficulty of having pastors, business leaders, and urban ministers in the same courses with different mindsets and viewpoints. Instead the school was named “Bakke Graduate University” to reflect the story of a family that was part of the founding group which had four siblings with prominent careers in business, urban ministry, church and women's leadership that mirrored the paradox of the school's vision.

BGU's main campus is currently located in Dallas but it serves more as a hub to support global activities. Many of BGU's regents, faculty, and staff are globally dispersed in locations where the majority of BGU students also reside. Students are not required to relocate from their home countries to earn a BGU degree.

== Academics ==
BGU courses are conducted using four methods:

1. City Immersions – 12-15 day city immersions in large global cities often led by BGU graduates who live in those cities. These immersions often include meetings with city mayors and key business leaders as well as opportunities for student to join the work of those who live with the poor and underserved. City immersions are preceded by online preparation and reading and often include groups of students from three or more continents participating.
2. On-line assisted – online courses with weekly video conference sessions, local mentoring, and specific application projects.
3. Local small groups in areas where there are enough students to meet face-to-face.
4. Mentoring from subject-matter experts in the students area of specialized study either on location or through online connections.

BGU offers five degrees:

1. Doctor of Transformational Leadership (DTL)
2. Doctor of Ministry (DMin)
3. Master of Arts in Transformational Leadership (MATL)
4. Executive Master of Business Administration (EMBA)
5. Doctor of Philosophy in Innovative Urban Leadership (PhD)

Degree programs include gift assessment, life vision coaching, and individual customization based up student goals.

From 2008 to 2018, BGU trained over 50,000 people in over 50 countries partnering with over 100 organizations to provide non-degree seminars and certificates. Primary topics of this training include leadership development, giftedness and calling, cross-cultural worldviews, human dignity economics, joy at work, and urban development. BGU served the Mustard Seed Foundation by finding and administrating their theology of work grant program.

== Accreditation ==
BGU is accredited by the Transnational Association of Christian Colleges and Schools (TRACS), which is recognized by the U.S. Department of Education and the Council for Higher Education Accreditation (CHEA). BGU is also authorized by the Texas Higher Education Coordinating Board and the National Council for State Authorization Reciprocity Agreements. BGU students in the US can utilize FAFSA to access the Federal Direct Student Loan Program and qualified US military veterans can access education benefits from the Veterans Benefits Administration.

BGU is accredited as a residential university that uses a variety of modes including city immersions and online courses.
