= 2020 Famous Idaho Potato Bowl (December) =

Postseason college football bowl game

- 24th Famous Idaho Potato Bowl
Tulane Green Wave	Nevada Wolf Pack
(6–5)	(6–2)
The American	Mountain West
27	38
Head coach: Willie Fritz	Head coach: Jay Norvell
	1	2	3	4	Total
Tulane	0	7	13	7	27
Nevada	6	20	0	12	38
- Date: December 22, 2020
- Season: 2020
- Stadium: Albertsons Stadium
- Location: Boise, Idaho
- MVP: Carson Strong (QB, Nevada)
- Favorite: Tulane by 1
- Referee: Steve Strimling (Pac-12)
- Attendance: 0

United States TV coverage
- Network: ESPN
- Announcers: Chris Cotter (play–by–play); Mark Herzlich (analyst); Taylor Davis (sideline)

International TV coverage
- Network: ESPN Deportes

The 2020 Famous Idaho Potato Bowl was a college football bowl game played on December 22, 2020, with kickoff at 3:30 p.m. EST (1:30 p.m. local MST) on ESPN. It was the 24th edition of the Famous Idaho Potato Bowl, and was one of the 2020–21 bowl games concluding the 2020 FBS football season.

Organizers announced that, due to the COVID-19 pandemic, there would be no fans in attendance at the game.

== Teams ==
The bowl was contested by the Nevada Wolf Pack, from the Mountain West Conference, and the Tulane Green Wave, from the American Athletic Conference (The American). They accepted bids to the bowl on December 13. The teams have met once previously, in 1992, with the Green Wave winning, 34–17. This was the teams' first meeting in a bowl game.

=== Tulane ===
Tulane of The American entered the bowl with an overall record of 6–5 (3–5 in conference play). The Green Wave made their first appearance in the bowl.

=== Nevada ===
Nevada of Mountain West entered the bowl with a record of 6–2, with all games having been played in conference. The Wolf Pack had previously appeared three times in the bowl, losing each contest, most recently the January 2020 edition.

== Game summary ==
2020 Famous Idaho Potato Bowl

Quarter	1	2	3	4	Total
Tulane	0	7	13	7	27
Nevada	6	20	0	12	38

at Albertsons Stadium • Boise, Idaho

- Date: Tuesday, December 22, 2020
- Game time: 3:30 p.m. EST (1:30 p.m. MST)
- Game weather: Partly Cloudy • Temperature: 40 °F (4 °C) • Wind: WNW 22 MPH
- Game attendance: 0
- Referee: Steve Strimling (Pac-12)
- TV announcers (ESPN): Chris Cotter (play–by–play), Mark Herzlich (analyst) and Taylor Davis (sideline)
- ESPN game summary

Game information

First quarter

- (4:58) NEV – Cole Turner 11 yard pass from Carson Strong, kick failed (Drive: 2 plays, 8 yards, 0:43; Nevada 6–0)

Second quarter

- (14:52) NEV – Justin Lockhart 23 yard pass from Carson Strong, Brandon Talton kick (Drive: 7 plays, 71 yards, 3:15; Nevada 13–0)
- (12:42) NEV – Toa Taua 44 yard pass from Carson Strong, 2-point pass failed (Drive: 3 plays, 55 yards, 1:18; Nevada 19–0)
- (10:38) TULN – Jha'Quan Jackson 41 yard pass from Michael Pratt, Merek Glover kick (Drive: 6 plays, 60 yards, 2:04; Nevada 19–7)
- (7:44) NEV – Toa Taua 50 yard rush, Brandon Talton kick (Drive: 8 plays, 82 yards, 2:48; Nevada 26–7)

Third quarter

- (10:03) TULN – Michael Pratt 6 yard rush, 2-point pass failed (Drive: 12 plays, 75 yards, 4:57; Nevada 26–13)
- (6:30) TULN – Jha'Quan Jackson 28 yard pass from Michael Pratt, Merek Glover kick (Drive: 4 plays, 45 yards, 1:16; Nevada 26–20)

Fourth quarter

- (13:22) NEV – Cole Turner 2 yard pass from Carson Strong, 2-point pass failed (Drive: 3 plays, 20 yards, 1:21; Nevada 32–20)
- (4:19) NEV – Jamaal Bell 21 yard pass from Carson Strong, kick failed (Drive: 6 plays, 87 yards, 2:21; Nevada 38–20)
- (0:07) TULN – Cameron Carroll 65 yard rush, Merek Glover kick (Drive: 1 play, 80 yards, 0:10; Nevada 38–27)

=== Statistics ===
Statistics	TUL	NEV
First downs	18	21
Plays–yards	63–365	72–480
Rushes–yards	38–197	44–209
Passing yards	168	271
Passing: comp–att–int	12–25–3	22–28–0
Time of possession	23:50	36:10

Team	Category	Player	Statistics
Tulane	Passing	Michael Pratt	12/25, 168 yards, 2 TD, 3 INT
Tulane	Rushing	Cameron Carroll	10 carries, 120 yards, 1 TD
Tulane	Receiving	Jha'Quan Jackson	2 receptions, 69 yards, 2 TD
Nevada	Passing	Carson Strong	22/28, 271 yards, 5 TD
Nevada	Rushing	Devonte Lee	18 carries, 105 yards
Nevada	Receiving	Toa Taua	6 receptions, 77 yards, 1 TD
