= 2020 New Mexico Lobos football team =

American college football season

2020 New Mexico Lobos football
- Conference: Mountain West Conference
- Record: 2–5 (2–5 MW)
- Head coach: Danny Gonzales (1st season)
- Offensive coordinator: Derek Warehime (1st season)
- Offensive scheme: No-huddle spread option
- Defensive coordinator: Rocky Long (1st season)
- Base defense: 3–3–5
- Home stadium: Sam Boyd Stadium

Uniform
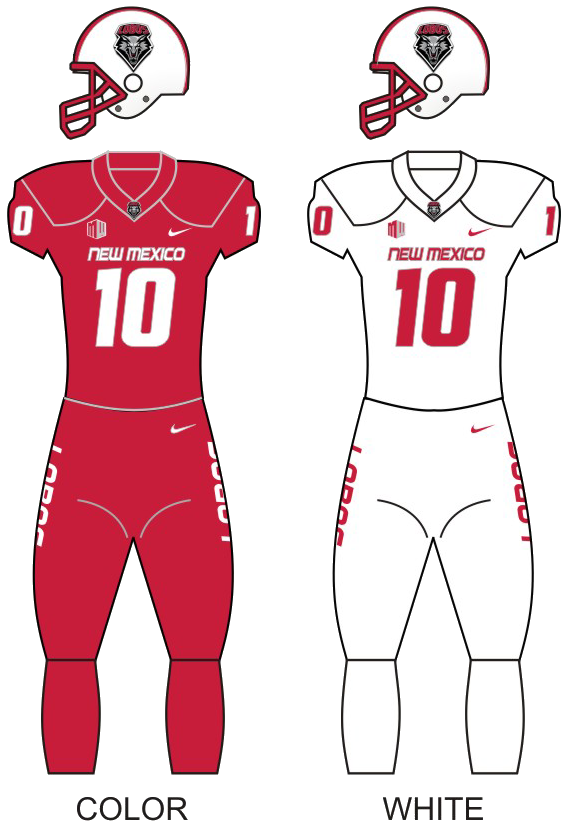

2020 Mountain West Conference football standings
	Conf.			Overall
Team	W		L	W		L
No. 24 San Jose State y$	6	–	0	7	–	1
Boise State y	5	–	0	5	–	2
Nevada	6	–	2	7	–	2
San Diego State	4	–	2	4	–	4
Hawaii	4	–	4	5	–	4
Fresno State	3	–	3	3	–	3
Air Force	2	–	2	3	–	3
Wyoming	2	–	4	2	–	4
New Mexico	2	–	5	2	–	5
Colorado State	1	–	3	1	–	3
Utah State	1	–	5	1	–	5
UNLV	0	–	6	0	–	6
Championship: San Jose State 34, Boise State 20
$ – Conference champion; y – Championship game participant; Note: Due to COVID-19, the Mountain West suspended the season, but later decided to begin play on October 24.; Rankings from AP Poll

The 2020 New Mexico Lobos football team represented the University of New Mexico as a member of the Mountain West Conference (MW) during the 2020 NCAA Division I FBS football season. Led by first-year head coach Danny Gonzales, the Lobos compiled an overall record of 2–5 with an identical mark in conference play, placing ninth in the MW. The team played home games at Sam Boyd Stadium in Whitney, Nevada due to COVID-19 pandemic restrictions imposed by the state of New Mexico.

On August 10, 2020, the MW suspended all sports competitions due to the COVID-19 pandemic. On September 24, the conference announced that the football season would begin on October 24.

== Schedule ==
New Mexico announced its 2020 football schedule on February 26, 2020. The Lobos' original schedule consisted of six home and seven away games in the regular season. On August 10, 2020, the Mountain West Conference announced the suspension of the football season due to the COVID-19 pandemic. In late September, the Mountain West Conference announced that the season would begin on October 24.

=== Original ===
Date	Opponent	Site	Result
August 29	Idaho State*	Dreamstyle Stadium; Albuquerque, NM	No contest
September 5	at Mississippi State*	Davis Wade Stadium; Starkville, MS	No contest
September 12	at USC*	Los Angeles Memorial Coliseum; Los Angeles, CA	No contest
September 19	at New Mexico State*	Aggie Memorial Stadium; Las Cruces, NM (Rio Grande Rivalry)	No contest
October 3	UMass*^{†}	University Stadium; Albuquerque, NM	No contest
October 10	at Colorado State	Canvas Stadium; Fort Collins, CO	Rescheduled
October 17	Nevada	University Stadium; Albuquerque, NM	Rescheduled
October 24	at Utah State	Maverik Stadium; Logan, UT	Rescheduled
October 31	San Jose State	University Stadium; Albuquerque, NM	No change
November 7	at Hawaii	Aloha Stadium; Halawa, HI	No change
November 14	Boise State	University Stadium; Albuquerque, NM	No contest
November 21	at Air Force	Falcon Stadium; Colorado Springs, CO	No change
November 28	Wyoming	University Stadium; Albuquerque, NM	Rescheduled
*Non-conference game; ^{†}Homecoming

=== Revised ===
Date	Time	Opponent	Site	TV	Result	Attendance
October 24	7:00 p.m.	at Colorado State	Canvas Stadium; Fort Collins, CO	FS2	Cancelled	
October 31	5:00 p.m.	at San Jose State	CEFCU Stadium; San Jose, CA (Note: The October 31 game originally scheduled at University Stadium in Albuquerque was relocated to San Jose due to COVID-19 cases related to contact tracing in Bernalillo County, New Mexico.)	FS1	L 21–38	0
November 7	9:00 p.m.	at Hawaii	Aloha Stadium; Halawa, HI	SPEC HI	L 33–39	0
November 14	4:30 p.m.	Nevada	Sam Boyd Stadium; Whitney, NV (Note: The November 14 game against Nevada, originally scheduled to be played at University Stadium in Albuquerque, was moved to Sam Boyd Stadium as a home game due to COVID-19 restrictions imposed by the state of New Mexico.)	FS2	L 20–27	250
November 20	7:30 p.m.	at Air Force	Falcon Stadium; Colorado Springs, CO	FS1	L 0–28	100
November 26	5:00 p.m.	at Utah State	Maverik Stadium; Logan, UT	FS1	L 27–41	198
December 5	8:30 p.m.	Wyoming	Sam Boyd Stadium; Whitney, NV	CBSSN	W 17–16	0
December 12	8:30 p.m.	Fresno State	Sam Boyd Stadium; Whitney, NV	FS1	W 49–39	250
All times are in Mountain time

== Preseason ==
=== Award watch lists ===
Listed in the order they were released

Award	Player	Position	Year
Outland Trophy	Teton Saltes	OL	SR
Wuerffel Trophy	Teton Saltes	OL	SR

=== Mountain West media days ===
The Mountain West media days were originally scheduled on July 16–17, 2020, at SoFi Stadium in Inglewood, California, but were canceled in favor of virtual media days due to the COVID-19 pandemic. The virtual media days that were scheduled to take place on July 27–29, 2020, were also canceled.

==== Media poll ====
The preseason poll was released on July 21, 2020. The Lobos were predicted to finish in sixth place in the MW Mountain Division. The divisions were later suspended for the 2020 season.

== Game summaries ==
=== At Colorado State (no contest) ===
New Mexico at Colorado State (no contest)

Team	1	2	3	4	Total
~~Lobos~~	0	0	0	0	0
~~Rams~~	0	0	0	0	0

- Date: ~~October 24, 2020~~
- Location: ~~Canvas Stadium~~
  ~~Fort Collins, CO~~
- Game start: ~~7:00 p.m.~~ MDT
- Television network: ~~FS2~~

The New Mexico at Colorado State game was canceled by the Mountain West, due to COVID-19 restrictions and the game was not rescheduled.

=== At San Jose State ===
New Mexico at San Jose State

Team	1	2	3	4	Total
Lobos	0	14	7	0	21
• Spartans	7	14	10	7	38

- Date: October 31, 2020
- Location: CEFCU Stadium
  San Jose, CA
- Game start: 4:11 p.m. PDT
- Elapsed time: 3 hours and 41 minutes
- Game attendance: 0
- Game weather: Temperature: 78 °F (26 °C) • Weather: Clear and Sunny • Wind: NW 7 MPH
- Referee: Mike Cuttone
- TV announcers (FS1): Guy Haberman (play–by–play) and Charles Arbuckle (analyst)

Scoring summary
1	00:31	SJSU	Tre Walker 37–yard pass from Nick Starkel (Matt Mercurio kick) (14 plays, 84 yards, 5:01)	SJSU 7–0
2	10:36	SJSU	Isaiah Hamilton 43–yard pass from Nick Starkel (Matt Mercurio kick) (8 plays, 84 yards, 3:16)	SJSU 14–0
2	09:33	NM	Cedric Patterson III 39–yard pass from Tevaka Tuioti (George Steinkamp kick) (4 plays, 84 yards, 0:59)	SJSU 14–7
2	06:10	SJSU	Tre Walker 26–yard pass from Nick Starkel (Matt Mercurio kick) (9 plays, 75 yards, 3:23)	SJSU 21–7
2	02:06	NM	Andre Erickson 4–yard pass from Tevaka Tuioti (George Steinkamp kick) (9 plays, 75 yards, 4:03)	SJSU 21–14
3	10:55	NM	Tevaka Tuioti 1–yard run (George Steinkamp kick) (8 plays, 71 yards, 3:02)	TIE 21–21
3	08:00	SJSU	Matt Mercurio 35–yard field goal (9 plays, 46 yards, 2:46)	SJSU 24–21
3	00:00	SJSU	Bailey Gaither 69–yard pass from Nick Starkel (Matt Mercurio kick) (1 play, 69 yards, 0:04)	SJSU 31–21
4	09:39	SJSU	Sam Olson 1–yard pass from Nick Starkel (Matt Mercurio kick) (8 plays, 76 yards, 3:50)	SJSU 38–21

Statistics	New Mexico	San Jose State
First downs	23	23
Total yards	443	579
Rushing yards	149	98
Passing yards	294	481
Turnovers	1	0
Time of possession	28:26	31:34

Team	Category	Player	Statistics
New Mexico	Passing	Tevaka Tuioti	20/35, 294 yards, 2 TDs, 1 INT
New Mexico	Rushing	Tevaka Tuioti	14 carries, 69 yards, 1 TD
New Mexico	Receiving	Andre Erickson	3 receptions, 72 yards, 1 TD
San Jose State	Passing	Nick Starkel	34/47, 467 yards, 5 TDs
San Jose State	Rushing	Isaiah Holiness	9 carries, 31 yards
San Jose State	Receiving	Bailey Gaither	10 receptions, 208 yards, 1 TD

=== At Hawaii ===
New Mexico at Hawaii

Team	1	2	3	4	Total
Lobos	17	3	7	6	33
• Rainbow Warriors	7	7	14	11	39

- Date: November 7, 2020
- Location: Aloha Stadium
  Halawa, HI
- Game start: 6:07 p.m.
- Elapsed time: 3 hours and 22 minutes
- Game attendance: 0
- Game weather: Temperature: 82 °F (28 °C) • Weather: 65% Humidity • Wind: ENE 13 MPH
- Referee: Timothy Davis
- TV announcers (SPEC HI): Robert Kekaula (play–by–play) and Rich Miano (analyst)

Scoring summary
1	14:19	NM	Jordan Kress 52–yard pass from Tevaka Tuioti (George Steinkamp kick) (3 plays, 65 yards, 0:41)	NM 7–0
1	10:21	UH	Chevan Cordeiro 5–yard run (Matthew Shipley kick) (12 plays, 67 yards, 3:55)	TIE 7–7
1	05:34	NM	George Steinkamp 27–yard field goal (10 plays, 61 yards, 4:39)	NM 10–7
1	04:10	NM	Jordan Kress 29–yard pass from Tevaka Tuioti (George Steinkamp kick) (1 play, 29 yards, 0:07)	NM 17–7
2	14:50	NM	George Steinkamp 49–yard field goal (6 plays, 46 yards, 2:25)	NM 20–7
2	03:55	UH	Nick Mardner 42–yard pass from Chevan Cordeiro (Matthew Shipley kick) (11 plays, 89 yards, 4:23)	NM 20–14
3	13:05	UH	Zion Bowens 42–yard pass from Chevan Cordeiro (Matthew Shipley kick) (5 plays, 75 yards, 1:55)	UH 21–20
3	11:55	UH	Zion Bowens 40–yard pass from Chevan Cordeiro (Matthew Shipley kick) (2 plays, 40 yards, 0:13)	UH 28–20
3	09:33	NM	Nathanie Jones 26–yard run (George Steinkamp kick) (7 plays, 76 yards, 2:17)	UH 28–27
4	13:31	NM	George Steinkamp 24–yard field goal (10 plays, 44 yards, 4:17)	NM 30–28
4	12:19	UH	Calvin Turner 64–yard pass from Chevan Cordeiro (Jared Smart pass) (3 plays, 75 yards, 1:12)	UH 36–30
4	06:33	UH	Matthew Shipley 41–yard field goal (9 plays, 55 yards, 3:20)	UH 39–30
4	01:21	NM	George Steinkamp 42–yard field goal (7 plays, 31 yards, 1:41)	UH 39–33

Statistics	New Mexico	Hawaii
First downs	24	23
Total yards	499	503
Rushing yards	279	93
Passing yards	220	410
Turnovers	1	2
Time of possession	32:22	27:38

Team	Category	Player	Statistics
New Mexico	Passing	Tevaka Tuioti	17/31, 181 yards, 2 TDs
New Mexico	Rushing	Nathanie Jones	13 carries, 96 yards, 1 TD
New Mexico	Receiving	Jordan Kress	3 receptions, 93 yards, 2 TDs
Hawaii	Passing	Chevan Cordeiro	33/43, 410 yards, 4 TDs, 2 INTs
Hawaii	Rushing	Chevan Cordeiro	10 carries, 39 yards, 1 TD
Hawaii	Receiving	Nick Mardner	6 receptions, 147 yards, 1 TD

=== Nevada ===
Nevada at New Mexico
(Battle of the Wolves)

Team	1	2	3	4	Total
• Wolf Pack	0	10	10	7	27
Lobos	7	6	0	7	20

- Date: November 14, 2020
- Location: Sam Boyd Stadium
  Whitney, NV
- Game start: 3:35 p.m. PST
- Elapsed time: 3 hours and 15 minutes
- Game attendance: 250
- Game weather: Temperature: 66 °F (19 °C) • Weather: Sunny • Wind: None
- Referee: Michael VanderVelde
- TV announcers (FS2): Anthony LaPanta (play–by–play) and Ron Johnson (analyst)

Scoring summary
1	00:08	NM	Trae Hall 16–yard pass from Bryson Carroll (George Steinkamp kick) (6 plays, 55 yards, 2:37)	NM 7–0
2	12:09	NM	George Steinkamp 26–yard field goal (7 plays, 44 yards, 2:57)	NM 10–0
2	03:41	NEV	Brandon Talton 28–yard field goal (8 plays, 38 yards, 4:13)	NM 10–3
2	03:21	NEV	Romeo Doubs 33–yard pass from Carson Strong (Brandon Talton kick) (1 play, 33 yards, 0:08)	TIE 10–10
2	01:04	NM	George Steinkamp 48–yard field goal (5 plays, 14 yards, 0:59)	NM 13–10
3	10:09	NEV	Brandon Talton 34–yard field goal (11 plays, 53 yards, 4:44)	TIE 13–13
3	04:36	NEV	Romeo Doubs 61–yard pass from Carson Strong (Brandon Talton kick) (4 plays, 82 yards, 1:24)	NEV 20–13
4	06:47	NEV	Romeo Doubs 59–yard pass from Carson Strong (Brandon Talton kick) (5 plays, 81 yards, 2:23)	NEV 27–13
4	04:02	NM	Bobby Cole 1–yard run (George Steinkamp kick) (7 plays, 61 yards, 2:37)	NEV 27–20

Statistics	Nevada	New Mexico
First downs	19	21
Total yards	392	352
Rushing yards	52	141
Passing yards	340	211
Turnovers	2	0
Time of possession	27:45	32:15

Team	Category	Player	Statistics
Nevada	Passing	Carson Strong	24/38, 336 yards, 3 TDs, 1 INT
Nevada	Rushing	Toa Taua	15 carries, 62 yards
Nevada	Receiving	Romeo Doubs	5 receptions, 172 yards, 3 TDs
New Mexico	Passing	Trae Hall	17/32, 195 yards, 1 INT
New Mexico	Rushing	Bobby Cole	17 carries, 90 yards, 1 TD
New Mexico	Receiving	Emmanuel Logan–Greene	5 receptions, 56 yards

=== At Air Force ===
New Mexico at Air Force

Team	1	2	3	4	Total
Lobos	0	0	0	0	0
• Falcons	7	14	0	7	28

- Date: November 20, 2020
- Location: Falcon Stadium
  Colorado Springs, CO
- Game start: 7:40 p.m. MST
- Elapsed time: 3 hours and 5 minutes
- Game attendance: 100
- Game weather: Temperature: 37 °F (3 °C) • Weather: Mostly Cloudy • Wind: S 6 MPH
- Referee: Christian Watson
- TV announcers (FS1): Alex Faust (play–by–play) and Petros Papadakis (analyst)

Scoring summary
1	05:07	AF	Haaziq Daniels 4–yard run (Tevye Schuettpelz-Rohl kick) (11 plays, 86 yards, 5:55)	AF 7–0
2	14:28	AF	Brad Roberts 5–yard run (Tevye Schuettpelz-Rohl kick) (10 plays, 72 yards, 4:48)	AF 14–0
2	06:13	AF	Brad Roberts 12–yard run (Tevye Schuettpelz-Rohl kick) (9 plays, 66 yards, 5:07)	AF 21–0
4	05:38	AF	Brad Roberts 44–yard run (Tevye Schuettpelz-Rohl kick) (1 play, 44 yards, 0:09)	AF 28–0

Statistics	New Mexico	Air Force
First downs	19	23
Total yards	304	422
Rushing yards	83	356
Passing yards	221	66
Turnovers	3	7
Time of possession	23:31	36:29

Team	Category	Player	Statistics
New Mexico	Passing	Trae Hall	23/42, 221 yards, 1 INT
New Mexico	Rushing	Nathanie Jones	6 carries, 29 yards
New Mexico	Receiving	Emmanuel Logan–Greene	3 receptions, 64 yards
Air Force	Passing	Haaziq Daniels	4/5, 66 yards
Air Force	Rushing	Brad Roberts	28 carries, 177 yards, 3 TDs
Air Force	Receiving	Kyle Patterson	2 receptions, 34 yards

=== At Utah State ===
New Mexico at Utah State

Team	1	2	3	4	Total
Lobos	3	10	7	7	27
• Aggies	3	3	28	7	41

- Date: November 26, 2020
- Location: Maverik Stadium
  Logan, UT
- Game start: 5:05 p.m. MST
- Elapsed time: 3 hours and 40 minutes
- Game attendance: 198
- Game weather: Temperature: 32 °F (0 °C) • Weather: N/A • Wind: NW 5 MPH
- Referee: Timothy Davis
- TV announcers (FS1): Alex Faust (play–by–play) and Petros Papadakis (analyst)

Scoring summary
1	06:54	USU	Connor Coles 27–yard field goal (12 plays, 61 yards, 6:41)	USU 3–0
1	00:39	NM	Donovan Murphree 39–yard field goal (15 plays, 55 yards, 6:10)	TIE 3–3
2	13:54	USU	Connor Coles 44–yard field goal (7 plays, 50 yards, 1:42)	USU 6–3
2	08:10	NM	Bobby Cole 1–yard run (Donovan Murphree kick) (13 plays, 89 yards, 5:38)	NM 10–6
2	00:03	NM	Donovan Murphree 31–yard field goal (9 plays, 66 yards, 2:21)	NM 13–6
3	12:20	USU	Justin McGriff 36–yard pass from Andrew Peasley (Connor Coles kick) (5 plays, 61 yards, 2:34)	TIE 13–13
3	08:52	USU	Savon Scarver 26–yard pass from Andrew Peasley (Connor Coles kick) (4 plays, 69 yards, 1:35)	USU 20–13
3	06:54	USU	Carson Terrell 25–yard pass from Andrew Peasley (Connor Coles kick) (3 plays, 41 yards, 1:14)	USU 27–13
3	05:17	USU	Kina Malie 16–yard fumble recovery (Connor Coles)	USU 34–13
3	02:50	NM	Andre Erickson 28–yard pass from Bryson Carroll (Donovan Murphree kick) (6 plays, 65 yards, 2:27)	USU 34–20
4	07:08	NM	Bobby Cole 1–yard run (Donovan Murphree kick) (9 plays, 87 yards, 3:31)	USU 34–27
4	04:03	USU	Andrew Peasley 62–yard run (Connor Coles kick) (5 plays, 77 yards, 2:58)	USU 41–27

Statistics	New Mexico	Utah State
First downs	25	22
Total yards	348	452
Rushing yards	196	209
Passing yards	152	243
Turnovers	2	2
Time of possession	31:05	28:55

Team	Category	Player	Statistics
New Mexico	Passing	Trae Hall	11/21, 63 yards
New Mexico	Rushing	Trae Hall	13 carries, 70 yards
New Mexico	Receiving	Andre Erickson	5 receptions, 55 yards, TD
Utah State	Passing	Andrew Peasley	14/21, 239 yards, 3 TD
Utah State	Rushing	Andrew Peasley	11 carries, 118 yards, TD
Utah State	Receiving	Justin McGriff	4 receptions, 99 yards, TD

=== Wyoming ===
Wyoming at New Mexico

Team	1	2	3	4	Total
Cowboys	3	10	0	3	16
• Lobos	0	10	0	7	17

- Date: December 5, 2020
- Location: Sam Boyd Stadium
  Whitney, NV
- Game start: 7:30 p.m. PST
- Elapsed time: 3 hours and 19 minutes
- Game attendance: 0
- Game weather: Temperature: 45 °F (7 °C) • Weather: Clear • Wind: SW 5 MPH
- Referee: Christian Watson
- TV announcers (CBSSN): John Sadak (play–by–play) and Randy Cross (analyst)

Scoring summary
1	11:42	WYO	John Hoyland 29–yard field goal (4 plays, 3 yards, 0:55)	WYO 3–0
2	14:53	NM	Nathanie Jones 21–yard run (Donovan Murphree kick) (9 plays, 59 yards, 4:39)	NM 7–3
2	08:56	WYO	Trey Smith 58–yard run (John Hoyland kick) (2 plays, 74 yards, 0:58)	WYO 10–7
2	06:11	NM	Donovan Murphree 40–yard field goal (5 plays, 2 yards, 2:35)	TIE 10–10
2	02:31	WYO	John Hoyland 26–yard field goal (8 plays, 68 yards, 3:32)	WYO 13–10
4	13:08	WYO	John Hoyland 25–yard field goal (9 plays, 86 yards, 3:28)	WYO 16–10
4	06:22	NM	Bobby Cole 44–yard pass from Isaiah Chavez (Donovan Murphree kick) (2 plays, 47 yards, 0:54)	NM 17–16

Statistics	Wyoming	New Mexico
First downs	12	16
Total yards	374	315
Rushing yards	283	223
Passing yards	91	92
Turnovers	2	2
Time of possession	25:28	34:32

Team	Category	Player	Statistics
Wyoming	Passing	Levi Williams	4/12, 73 yards, 1 INT
Wyoming	Rushing	Trey Smith	24 carries, 154 yards, 1 TD
Wyoming	Receiving	Isaiah Neyor	1 reception, 54 yards
New Mexico	Passing	Isaiah Chavez	5/10, 55 yards, 1 TD
New Mexico	Rushing	Bobby Cole	22 carries, 131 yards
New Mexico	Receiving	Bobby Cole	2 receptions, 53 yards, 1 TD

=== Fresno State ===
Fresno State at New Mexico

Team	1	2	3	4	Total
Bulldogs	7	17	7	8	39
• Lobos	7	14	7	21	49

- Date: December 12, 2020
- Location: Sam Boyd Stadium
  Whitney, NV
- Game start: 7:35 p.m. PST
- Elapsed time: 3 hours and 23 minutes
- Game attendance: 250
- Game weather: Temperature: 48 °F (9 °C) • Weather: Windy • Wind: 12 MPH
- Referee: Michael VanderVelde
- TV announcers (FS1): Guy Haberman (play–by–play) and Charles Arbuckle (analyst)

Scoring summary
1	11:28	FS	Jalen Cropper 10–yard pass from Jake Haener (Asa Fuller kick) (6 plays, 44 yards, 1:46)	FS 7–0
1	06:34	NM	Isaiah Chavez 3–yard run (Donovan Murphree kick) (9 plays, 75 yards, 4:54)	TIE 7–7
2	14:54	FS	Zane Pope 16–yard pass from Jake Haener (Asa Fuller kick) (6 plays, 50 yards, 2:06)	FS 14–7
2	11:54	NM	Nathanie Jones 3–yard run (Donovan Murphree kick) (6 plays, 75 yards, 3:00)	TIE 14–14
2	10:27	FS	Asa Fuller 30–yard field goal (5 plays, 56 yards, 1:22)	FS 17–14
2	08:47	FS	Jordan Mims 84–yard run (Asa Fuller kick) (1 play, 84 yards, 0:15)	FS 24–14
2	05:23	NM	Bobby Cole 4–yard run (Donovan Murphree kick) (7 plays, 71 yards, 3:20)	FS 24–21
3	06:53	FS	Jake Haener 3–yard run (Asa Fuller kick) (16 plays, 70 yards, 7:59)	FS 31–21
3	04:49	NM	Connor Kinslow 49–yard pass from Isaiah Chavez (Donovan Murphree kick) (5 plays, 77 yards, 1:58)	FS 31–28
4	10:20	NM	Nathanie Jones 10–yard run (Donovan Murphree kick) (14 plays, 85 yards, 7:33)	NM 35–31
4	07:26	NM	Bobby Cole 35–yard run (Donovan Murphree kick) (1 play, 35 yards, 0:07)	NM 42–31
4	02:33	NM	Bobby Cole 9–yard run (Donovan Murphree kick) (5 plays, 70 yards, 2:45)	NM 49–31
4	01:08	FS	Mac Dalena 24–yard pass from Jake Haener (Zane Pope pass) (8 plays, 74 yards, 1:18)	NM 49–39

Statistics	Fresno State	New Mexico
First downs	23	24
Total yards	408	495
Rushing yards	58	299
Passing yards	350	196
Turnovers	1	0
Time of possession	28:27	31:33

Team	Category	Player	Statistics
Fresno State	Passing	Jake Haener	26/43, 350 yards, 3 TDs, 1 INT
Fresno State	Rushing	Jordan Mims	3 carries, 85 yards, 1 TD
Fresno State	Receiving	Jalen Cropper	12 receptions, 134 yards, 1 TD
New Mexico	Passing	Isaiah Chavez	14/18, 196 yards, 1 TD
New Mexico	Rushing	Bobby Cole	18 carries, 138 yards, 3 TDs
New Mexico	Receiving	Emmanuel Logan–Greene	7 receptions, 55 yards

== Roster ==
2020 New Mexico Lobos football team roster
Players
Coaches
Offense

Pos.	#	Name	Class
WR	3	Jace Taylor	Fr
WR	4	Bobby Wooden	Fr
RB	5	Daevon Vigilant	Jr
RB	6	Bryson Carroll	Jr
WR	7	Anselem Umeh	Sr
QB	8	Tevaka Tuioti	Jr
WR	9	Jordan Kress	Sr
QB	10	Trae Hall	So
WR	11	Cedric Patterson III	So
QB	12	Brandt Hughes	Jr
QB	13	Isaiah Chavez	Fr
WR	14	Tye Moore	Fr
QB	16	Connor Genal	Fr
WR	17	Emmanuel Logan–Greene	Sr
WR	18	Jonah Leyva	Jr
RB	21	Chad Alexander	Fr
WR	23	Jay Griffin IV	Sr
RB	25	Nathaniel Jones	Fr
RB	28	Josh Foley	So
RB	34	Bobby Cole	Jr
RB	37	Kendal Taylor	Fr
WR	38	Jathan Washington	Fr
TE	41	Connor Witthoft	Fr
TE	47	Caleb Marra	Fr
OL	50	Teton Saltes	Sr
OL	55	Radson Jang	Jr
OL	56	Austin Cook	Sr
OL	64	Kyle Stapley	Sr
OL	65	Justice Spates	So
OL	66	Jacob Jankoviak	Sr
OL	67	Isaak Gutierrez	So
OL	68	Hayden Wilson	Jr
OL	69	Anthony Panto	Fr
OL	70	Brad Murphy	Jr
OL	71	Ben Davis	Sr
OL	72	Jer'Marques Bailey	Fr
OL	73	Cade Briggs	So
OL	74	Greg Brown II	Fr
OL	75	Leke Asenuga	Fr
OL	76	Vincent Santos
OL	79	Walter Baca	Fr
WR	80	Ryan Cosper	Fr
WR	81	Elijah Queen	Fr
WR	82	Austin Erickson	Fr
WR	83	Blake Wells	Jr
TE	85	Kyle Jarvis	Sr
TE	86	Kyle Hester	Fr
WR	87	Andrew Erickson	Fr
TE	88	Marcus Williams	Sr
TE	89	Conner Kinslow	Fr

Defense

Pos.	#	Name	Class
CB	2	Tony Collier	Sr
S	3	Patrick Peek	Sr
S	4	Shaddrick Lowery	Sr
LB	5	James Lewis	Sr
CB	8	Donte Martin	So
S	9	Jerrick Reed II	Jr
LB	11	Kameron Miller	Sr
CB	12	Antonio Hunt	So
S	13	Nico Bolden	Jr
CB	14	Michael LoVett III	Sr
S	15	Letayveon Beaton	Sr
S	16	Tavian Combs	Fr
DE	17	Ben Bertram	So
LB	19	Devin Sanders	Sr
LB	23	Reco Hannah	Sr
S	24	Corey Hightower	Sr
S	25	Marqaue Kirkendoll	Fr
CB	26	Nic Wilson	Jr
S	27	Quinn Potts	Fr
CB	29	Donald Jones	Fr
LB	30	Ray Leutele	Fr
S	31	Mathias Bertram	Fr
LB	35	Semaj Sims	Fr
LB	36	Syaire Riley	Fr
LB	38	Matthew French	Jr
DE	39	Kyler Drake	Fr
LB	41	Dion Hunter	Fr
LB	45	Joshua Woisin	Jr
LB	46	Brandon Shook	Sr
DE	49	Elijah Lash	Fr
DE	51	Bryce Santana	Fr
DL	52	Ian Shewell	Fr
NT	54	Langston Murray	Jr
NT	55	Elmer Pauni	Sr
NT	57	Keith Alvarado	Fr
NT	58	Cody Moon	Fr
NT	78	Louis Harden	So
NT	90	O.J. Bartley	Fr
DE	92	Omar Darame	Fr
DE	93	Adam Gay	Sr
DE	94	Harshan Sachdeva	Fr
DE	95	Jake Saltonstall	So
DE	97	Justin Harris	Jr
DE	98	Joey Noble	Sr
NT	99	Ben Gansallo	Sr

Special teams

Pos.	#	Name	Class
N/A	22	Darius McCray	Fr
PK	35	George Steinkamp	So
PK	47	Jared Long	Fr
LS	48	Troy Sicaeros	Fr
PK	94	Andrew Shelley	Jr
P	96	Tyson Dyer	Sr
PK	99	Donovan Murphree	So

Head coach

- Danny Gonzales (New Mexico)

Coordinators/assistant coaches

- Derek Warehime (Tulsa)
  Offensive Coordinator
  Tight Ends
- Rocky Long (New Mexico)
  Defensive Coordinator
  Linebackers
- Jamie Christian (Fresno State and Central Washington)
  Special Teams Coordinator
- Troy Reffett (UTEP)
  Cornerbacks
- Jason Lenzmeier (New Mexico)
  Offensive Line
- Jordan Salkin (West Virginia)
  Quarterbacks
- Brandon Blackmon (Mt. San Antonio, Purdue and Tennessee State)
  Wide Receivers
- Jerome Haywood (San Diego State)
  Defensive Line
- Jordan Somerville (Arizona State)
  Running Backs
- David Howes (New Mexico State and New Mexico)
  Safeties
- Joey Romero (New Mexico)
  Defensive Graduate Assistant
- Jake Rothschiller (New Mexico)
  Defensive Graduate Assistant
- Matt Clark (Eastern Kentucky and Western Illinois)
  Offensive Graduate Assistant
- Gray Curtis (Southern Miss)
  Offensive Graduate Assistant

Support staff

- James Carson (Bucknell)
  Director of Athletic Performance
- Nate Matos (Arizona State and Western Illinois)
  Football Assistant Director
- Gavin Bevis (Southwestern and Pittsburg State)
  Co–Director of Operations
- Jordan Fiske (UMass)
  Athletic Performance Graduate Assistant
- Chris Schieder (Cincinnati)
  Football Equipment Operations Specialist
- Jacob Grant (Arizona State)
  Co–Director of Operations
- Ben Grant (Arizona State)
  Football Operations Coordinator
- John Lintner (Miami – OH)
  Video Coordinator
- Paul Kasero
  Videographer

Legend

- (C) Team captain
- (S) Suspended
- (I) Ineligible
- Injured
- Redshirt

Roster
Last update: December 11, 2020
