= 2020 San Jose State Spartans football team =

American college football season

2020 San Jose State Spartans football

MW champion

MW Championship Game, W 34–20 vs. Boise State

Arizona Bowl, L 13–34 vs. Ball State
- Conference: Mountain West Conference

Ranking
- Coaches: No. 24
- AP: No. 24
- Record: 7–1 (6–0 MW)
- Head coach: Brent Brennan (4th season)
- Offensive coordinator: Kevin McGiven (3rd season)
- Offensive scheme: Spread option
- Defensive coordinator: Derrick Odum (4th season)
- Base defense: 3–4
- Home stadium: CEFCU Stadium

Uniform
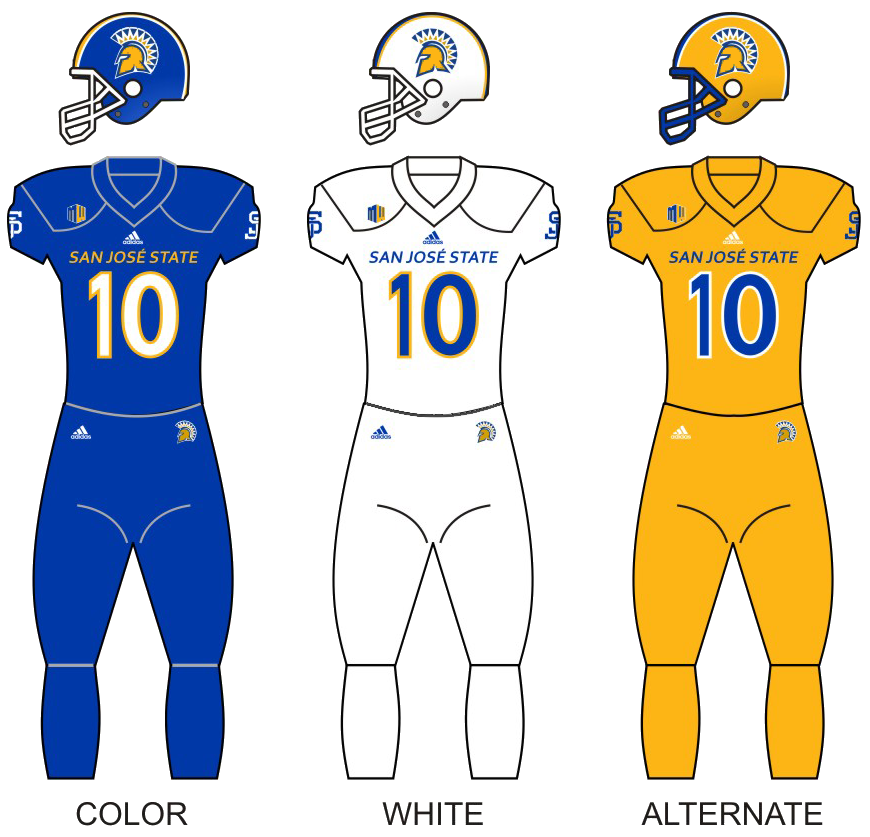

2020 Mountain West Conference football standings
	Conf.			Overall
Team	W		L	W		L
No. 24 San Jose State y$	6	–	0	7	–	1
Boise State y	5	–	0	5	–	2
Nevada	6	–	2	7	–	2
San Diego State	4	–	2	4	–	4
Hawaii	4	–	4	5	–	4
Fresno State	3	–	3	3	–	3
Air Force	2	–	2	3	–	3
Wyoming	2	–	4	2	–	4
New Mexico	2	–	5	2	–	5
Colorado State	1	–	3	1	–	3
Utah State	1	–	5	1	–	5
UNLV	0	–	6	0	–	6
Championship: San Jose State 34, Boise State 20
$ – Conference champion; y – Championship game participant; Note: Due to COVID-19, the Mountain West suspended the season, but later decided to begin play on October 24.; Rankings from AP Poll

The 2020 San Jose State Spartans football team represented San José State University during the 2020 NCAA Division I FBS football season. The Spartans were led by fourth-year head coach Brent Brennan and played their home games at CEFCU Stadium and Sam Boyd Stadium as members of the Mountain West Conference. They finished the regular season 6–0 in Mountain West play and defeated Boise State in the Mountain West championship game. This was the Spartans' first Mountain West championship win and 17th overall conference title. The championship victory also marked San Jose State's first win over Boise State in program history. In addition, this was their first bowl game since 2015 and first winning season since 2012.

== Schedule ==
San Jose State had non-conference games scheduled against Central Michigan, UC Davis, Penn State and UConn, but all of these games were canceled due to the COVID-19 pandemic. On August 10, 2020, the Mountain West Conference suspended all fall sports competitions due to the COVID-19 pandemic. However, MWC officials announced on Sept. 24 the conference would host a shortened fall football schedule.

The Oct. 31 game originally scheduled at University Stadium in Albuquerque was relocated to San Jose due to COVID-19 cases related to contact tracing in Bernalillo County, New Mexico.

On November 19, the game at Fresno State scheduled for Nov. 21 was canceled because of a positive COVID-19 test and contact tracing within the Fresno State program.

Nearly four and a half hours before kickoff, the Nov. 28 game at Boise State was canceled because of "an upward trend of COVID-19 cases and contact tracing within the Boise State football program."

The home game against Hawaii scheduled for Dec. 5 was moved to Aloha Stadium in Honolulu after new COVID-19 restrictions were released in Santa Clara County, where CEFCU Stadium is located.

The Dec. 11 home game against Nevada, originally scheduled to be played at CEFCU Stadium, was moved to Sam Boyd Stadium due to COVID-19 restrictions imposed by Santa Clara County.

The Mountain West conference championship game was to be hosted by San Jose at CEFCU Stadium, but was moved to Sam Boyd Stadium due to COVID-19 restrictions imposed by Santa Clara County.

Date	Time	Opponent	Rank	Site	TV	Result	Attendance
October 24	7:30 p.m.	Air Force		CEFCU Stadium; San Jose, CA	FS1	W 17–6	0
October 31	4:00 p.m.	New Mexico		CEFCU Stadium; San Jose, CA	FS1	W 38–21	0
November 6	6:00 p.m.	at San Diego State		Dignity Health Sports Park; Carson, CA	CBSSN	W 28–17	0
November 14	7:30 p.m.	UNLV		CEFCU Stadium; San Jose, CA	FS2	W 34–17	0
~~November 21~~	~~4:00 p.m.~~	at ~~Fresno State~~		~~Bulldog Stadium~~; ~~Fresno, CA~~ (~~rivalry~~)	~~CBSSN~~	No Contest	
~~November 28~~	~~1:00 p.m.~~	at ~~Boise State~~		~~Albertsons Stadium~~; ~~Boise, ID~~	~~Fox~~	No Contest	
December 5	3:00 p.m.	at Hawaii		Aloha Stadium; Honolulu, HI (Dick Tomey Legacy Game)	SPEC HI	W 35–24	0
December 11	7:00 p.m.	vs. Nevada		Sam Boyd Stadium; Whitney, NV	CBSSN	W 30–20	0
December 19	1:30 p.m.	vs. Boise State	No. 24	Sam Boyd Stadium; Whitney, NV (MW Championship Game)	Fox	W 34–20	0
December 31	11:00 a.m.	vs. Ball State*	No. 22	Arizona Stadium; Tucson, AZ (Arizona Bowl)	CBS	L 13–34	0
*Non-conference game; Rankings from AP Poll and CFP Rankings after November 24 released prior to game; All times are in Pacific time

== Game summaries ==
=== Air Force ===
Air Force Falcons at San Jose State Spartans

Quarter	1	2	3	4	Total
Falcons	0	0	0	6	6
Spartans	0	0	14	3	17

at CEFCU Stadium, San Jose, CA

- Date: October 24, 2020
- Game time: 7:30 p.m. PDT
- Game weather: Temperature: 62 °F (17 °C) • Wind: NNW 7 mph • Weather: Clear
- Game attendance: 0
- Referee: Scott Campbell
- TV announcers (FS1): Alex Faust (play-by-play) & Petros Papadakis (analyst)
- ESPN - Air Force Falcons at San Jose State Spartans

Game information

First Quarter

No scoring

Second Quarter

No scoring

Third Quarter

- (06:48) SJSU TD – Derrick Deese Jr. 7-yard pass from Nick Starkel, Matt Mercurio kick
  Drive: 9 plays, 92 yards, 4:30; San Jose State 7–0
- (00:43) SJSU TD – Derrick Deese Jr. 11-yard pass from Nick Starkel, Matt Mercurio kick
  Drive: 3 plays, 14 yards, 1:24; San Jose State 14–0

Fourth Quarter

- (13:16) AFA TD – Kyle Patterson 34-yard pass from Haaziq Daniels, Haaziq Daniels rush failed
  Drive: 6 plays, 65 yards, 2:27; San Jose State 14–6
- (05:18) SJSU FG – Matt Mercurio 30-yard field goal
  Drive: 15 plays, 78 yards, 7:50; San Jose State 17–6

Passing

- AFA – Haaziq Daniels: 9/17, 92 yards, 1 TD
- SJSU – Nick Starkel: 22/29, 226 yards, 2 TD, 1 INT

Rushing

- AFA – Brandon Lewis: 9 carries, 60 yards
- SJSU – Kairee Robinson: 12 carries, 31 yards

Receiving

- AFA – Kyle Patterson: 3 receptions, 56 yards, 1 TD
- SJSU – Bailey Gaither: 8 receptions, 110 yards

Win Probability

Line

Over/Under

- 64

=== New Mexico ===
New Mexico Lobos at San Jose State Spartans

Quarter	1	2	3	4	Total
Lobos	0	14	7	0	21
Spartans	7	14	10	7	38

at CEFCU Stadium, San Jose, CA

- Date: October 31, 2020
- Game time: 4:00 p.m. PDT
- Game weather: Temperature: 78 °F (26 °C) • Weather: Clear and Sunny • Wind: NW 7 MPH
- Game attendance: 0
- Referee: Mike Cuttone
- TV announcers (FS1): Guy Haberman (play–by–play) and Charles Arbuckle (analyst)
- ESPN - New Mexico Lobos at San Jose State Spartans

Game information

First Quarter

- (00:31) SJSU TD – Tre Walker 37-yard pass from Nick Starkel, Matt Mercurio kick
  Drive: 14 plays, 84 yards, 5:01; San Jose State 7–0

Second Quarter

- (10:36) SJSU TD – Isaiah Hamilton 43-yard pass from Nick Starkel, Matt Mercurio kick
  Drive: 8 plays, 84 yards, 3:16; San Jose State 14–0
- (09:33) NM TD – Cedric Patterson III 39-yard pass from Tevaka Tuioti, George Steinkamp kick
  Drive: 4 plays, 84 yards, 0:59; San Jose State 14–7
- (06:10) SJSU TD – Tre Walker 26-yard pass from Nick Starkel, Matt Mercurio kick
  Drive: 9 plays, 75 yards, 3:23; San Jose State 21–7
- (02:06) NM TD – Andre Erickson 4-yard pass from Tevaka Tuioti, George Steinkamp kick
  Drive: 9 plays, 75 yards, 4:03; San Jose State 21–14

Third Quarter

- (10:55) NM TD – Tevaka Tuioti 1-yard run, George Steinkamp kick
  Drive: 8 plays, 71 yards, 3:02; Tied 21–21
- (08:00) SJSU FG – Matt Mercurio 30-yard field goal
  Drive: 9 plays, 46 yards, 2:46; San Jose State 24–21
- (00:00) SJSU TD – Bailey Gaither 69-yard pass from Nick Starkel, Matt Mercurio kick
  Drive: 1 play, 69 yards, 0:04; San Jose State 31–21

Fourth Quarter

- (09:36) SJSU TD – Sam Olson 1-yard pass from Nick Starkel, Matt Mercurio kick
  Drive: 8 plays, 76 yards, 3:50; San Jose State 38–21

Passing

- NM – Tevaka Tuioti – 20/35, 294 yards, 2 TD, INT
- SJSU – Nick Starkel – 34/47, 467 yards, 5 TD

Rushing

- NM – Tevaka Tuioti – 14 carries, 69 yards, TD
- SJSU – Isaiah Holiness – 9 carries, 31 yards

Receiving

- NM – Andre Erickson – 3 receptions, 72 yards, TD
- SJSU – Bailey Gaither – 10 receptions, 208 yards, TD

Win Probability

- SJSU –

Line

- SJSU –13.5

Over/Under

- 56

=== At San Diego State ===
San Jose State Spartans at San Diego State Aztecs

Quarter	1	2	3	4	Total
Spartans	0	7	7	14	28
Aztecs	3	7	0	7	17

at Dignity Health Sports Park, Carson, CA

- Date: November 6
- Game time: 6:00 p.m. PST
- Game attendance: 0
- TV: CBSSN
- ESPN - San Jose State Spartans at San Diego State Aztecs

Game information

First Quarter
Second Quarter
Third Quarter
Fourth Quarter

Passing

- SJSU –
- SDSU –

Rushing

- SJSU –
- SDSU –

Receiving

- SJSU –
- SDSU –

Win Probability

Line

- SDSU -10.0

Over/Under

- 51

=== UNLV ===
UNLV Rebels at San Jose State Spartans

Quarter	1	2	3	4	Total
Rebels	3	7	7	0	17
Spartans	10	14	7	3	34

at CEFCU Stadium, San Jose, CA

- Date: November 14, 2020
- Game time: 7:30 p.m. PST
- Game attendance: 0
- TV: FS2
- ESPN - UNLV Rebels at San Jose State Spartans

Game information

First Quarter
Second Quarter
Third Quarter
Fourth Quarter

Passing

- UNLV –
- SJSU –

Rushing

- UNLV –
- SJSU –

Receiving

- UNLV –
- SJSU –

Win Probability

Line

- SJSU -17.0

Over/Under

- 62

=== At Fresno State (No contest) ===
Battle for the Valley Trophy: San Jose State Spartans at Fresno State Bulldogs

Quarter	1	2	3	4	Total
Spartans	0	0	0	0	0
Bulldogs	0	0	0	0	0

at Bulldog Stadium, Fresno, CA

- Date: November 21, 2020
- Game time: 4:00 p.m. PST
- Game attendance: 0 (No contest)
- TV: CBSSN
- ESPN - San Jose State-Fresno State college football game canceled because of COVID-19 protocols

Game information

First Quarter
Second Quarter
Third Quarter
Fourth Quarter

Passing

- SJSU –
- FRES –

Rushing

- SJSU –
- FRES –

Receiving

- SJSU –
- FRES –

Win Probability

Line

Over/Under

=== At Boise State (No contest) ===
San Jose State Spartans at Boise State Broncos

Quarter	1	2	3	4	Total
Spartans	0	0	0	0	0
Broncos	0	0	0	0	0

at Albertsons Stadium, Boise, ID

- Date: November 28, 2020
- Game time: 1:00 p.m. PST
- Game attendance: 0
- TV: Fox
- ESPN - San Jose Spartans vs. Boise Broncos Game Cancelled Due to COVID-19

Game information

First Quarter
Second Quarter
Third Quarter
Fourth Quarter

Passing

- BSU –
- SJSU –

Rushing

- BSU –
- SJSU –

Receiving

- BSU –
- SJSU –

Win Probability

Line

- BSU -11.5

Over/Under

- 58

=== At Hawaii ===
San Jose State Spartans at Hawaii Rainbow Warriors

Quarter	1	2	3	4	Total
Spartans	21	0	7	7	35
Rainbow Warriors	0	10	7	7	24

at Aloha Stadium, Honolulu, HI

- Date: December 5, 2020
- Game time: 3:00 p.m. HST
- Game weather: Temperature: 85 °F (29 °C) • Wind: N 7 MPH • Weather: Slightly Humid
- Game attendance: 0
- Referee: Timothy Davis
- TV announcers (SPEC HI / Stadium): Robert Kekaula (play-by-play) & Rich Miano (analyst)
- ESPN - San Jose St. plays first game in 3 weeks, beats Hawaii 35-24

Game information

First Quarter

- (11:43) SJSU TD – Isaiah Holiness 2-yard pass from Nick Starkel, Matt Mercurio kick
  Drive: 9 plays, 75 yards, 3:17; San Jose State 7–0
- (9:36) SJSU TD – Tyler Nevens 72-yard rush, Matt Mercurio kick
  Drive: 2 plays, 75 yards, 0:28; San Jose State 14–0
- (6:24) SJSU TD – Tyler Nevens 10-yard rush, Matt Mercurio kick
  Drive: 6 plays, 53 yards, 1:57; San Jose State 21–0

Second Quarter

- (9:21) UH FG – Matthew Shipley 25-yard field goal
  Drive: 11 plays, 72 yards, 3:48; San Jose State 21–3
- (3:12) UH TD – Dae Dae Hunter 10-yard pass from Chevan Cordeiro, Matthew Shipley kick
  Drive: 5 plays, 39 yards, 2:14; San Jose State 21–10

Third Quarter

- (9:48) UH TD – Rico Bussey 11-yard pass from Chevan Cordeiro, Matthew Shipley kick
  Drive: 12 plays, 74 yards, 5:07; San Jose State 21–17
- (2:17) SJSU TD – Kairee Robinson 2-yard rush, Matt Mercurio kick
  Drive: 18 plays, 70 yards, 7:31; San Jose State 28–17

Fourth Quarter

- (12:03) SJSU TD – Tre Walker 50-yard pass from Nick Starkel, Matt Mercurio kick
  Drive: 7 plays, 80 yards, 2:44; San Jose State 35–17
- (2:24) UH TD – Chevan Cordeiro 4-yard rush, Matthew Shipley kick
  Drive: 10 plays, 60 yards, 4:40; San Jose State 35–24

Passing

- SJSU – Nick Starkel – 11/23, 167 yards, 2 TD, INT
- HAW – Chevan Cordeiro – 28/42, 238 yards, 2 TD, INT

Rushing

- SJSU – Tyler Nevens – 16 carries, 152 yards, 2 TD
- HAW – Chevan Cordeiro – 11 carries, 36 yards, TD

Receiving

- SJSU – Tre Walker – 2 receptions, 64 yards, TD
- HAW – Rico Bussey – 8 receptions, 69 yards, TD

Win Probability

Line

- SJSU -2.5

Over/Under

- 60

=== Vs. Nevada ===
Nevada Wolf Pack vs. San Jose State Spartans

Quarter	1	2	3	4	Total
Wolf Pack	10	10	0	0	20
Spartans	7	0	20	3	30

at Sam Boyd Stadium, Whitney, NV

- Date: December 11, 2020
- Game time: 7:00 p.m. PST
- Game attendance: 0
- TV: CBSSN
- ESPN - San Jose St. beats Nevada, advances to MWC Championship game

Game information

First Quarter
Second Quarter
Third Quarter
Fourth Quarter

Passing

- NEV –
- SJSU –

Rushing

- NEV –
- SJSU –

Receiving

- NEV –
- SJSU –

Win Probability

Line

- NEV -2.5

Over/Under

- 62

=== Vs. Boise State (MWC Championship game) ===
No. 24 San Jose State Spartans vs. Boise State Broncos (2020 Mountain West Conference Football Championship game)

Quarter	1	2	3	4	Total
Broncos	3	3	7	7	20
No. 24 Spartans	7	12	0	15	34

at Sam Boyd Stadium, Whitney, NV

- Date: December 19, 2020
- Game time: 1:30 p.m. PST
- Game weather: Sunny • Temperature: 56 °F (13 °C) • Wind: NE 1 mph
- Game attendance: 0
- Referee: Scott Campbell
- TV announcers (Fox): Tim Brando (play-by-play) and Petros Papadakis (analyst)
- ESPN - No. 25 San Jose State beats Boise State in MWC title game

Game information

First quarter

- (8:36) SJSU – Tre Walker 55 yard pass from Nick Starkel, Matt Mercurio kick (Drive: 3 plays, 71 yards, 1:48; San Jose State 7–0)
- (3:31) BSU – Jonah Dalmas 51 yard field goal (Drive: 11 plays, 44 yards, 5:05; San Jose State 7–3)

Second quarter

- (14:46) SJSU – Matt Mercurio 24 yard field goal (Drive: 13 plays, 68 yards, 3:45; San Jose State 10–3)
- (6:40) SJSU – Matt Mercurio 36 yard field goal (Drive: 6 plays, 39 yards, 1:56; San Jose State 13–3)
- (2:31) SJSU – Matt Mercurio 26 yard field goal (Drive: 8 plays, 61 yards, 3:27; San Jose State 16–3)
- (0:50) SJSU – Matt Mercurio 32 yard field goal (Drive: 6 plays, 36 yards, 1:05; San Jose State 19–3)
- (0:01) BSU – Jonah Dalmas 50 yard field goal (Drive: 5 plays, 39 yards, 0:50; San Jose State 19–6)

Third quarter

- (2:48) BSU – Avery Williams 69 yard punt return, Jonah Dalmas kick (San Jose State 19–13)

Fourth quarter

- (14:17) SJSU – Isaiah Hamilton 30 yard pass from Nick Starkel, 2-point pass good (Drive: 9 plays, 75 yards, 3:31; San Jose State 27–13)
- (10:51) BSU – Hank Bachmeier 2 yard rush, Jonah Dalmas kick (Drive: 7 plays, 63 yards, 3:26; San Jose State 27–20)
- (3:48) SJSU – Derrick Deese Jr. 1 yard pass from Nick Starkel, Matt Mercurio kick (Drive: 7 plays, 42 yards, 4:30; San Jose State 34–20)

Passing

- BSU – Hank Bachmeier – 20/40, 221 yards
- SJSU – Nick Starkel – 32/52, 453 yards, 3 TD

Rushing

- BSU – Andrew Van Buren – 11 carries, 26 yards
- SJSU – Kairee Robinson – 12 carries, 39 yards

Receiving

- BSU – Khalil Shakir – 6 receptions, 85 yards
- SJSU – Tre Walker – 7 receptions, 137 yards, TD

Win Probability

Line

- BSU -6.5

Over/Under

- 59

=== Vs. Ball State (Arizona Bowl) ===
No. 22 San Jose State Spartans vs. Ball State Cardinals (2020 Offerpad Arizona Bowl)

Quarter	1	2	3	4	Total
Cardinals	27	0	7	0	34
No. 22 Spartans	0	0	13	0	13

at Arizona Stadium, Tucson, AZ

- Date: December 31, 2020
- Game time: 11:00 a.m. PST
- Game weather: Partly cloudy • Temperature: 55 °F (13 °C) • Wind: ESE 8 mph
- Game attendance: 0
- Referee: Joe Lehring
- TV announcers (CBS): Brad Nessler (play–by–play), Rick Neuheisel (analyst) and Jenny Dell (sideline)
- ESPN - Arizona Bowl Ball State Cardinals vs. No. 22 San Jose State Spartans

Game information

First quarter

- (12:41) BALL – Antonio Phillips 53 yard interception return, kick failed (Ball State 6–0)
- (10:00) BALL – Will Jones 3 yard rush, Jacob Lewis kick (Drive: 6 plays, 50 yards, 1:50; Ball State 13–0)
- (5:15) BALL – Tye Evans 3 yard rush, Jacob Lewis kick (Drive: 8 plays, 67 yards, 2:41; Ball State 20–0)
- (1:04) BALL – Drew Plitt 1 yard rush, Jacob Lewis kick (Drive: 6 plays, 35 yards, 1:52; Ball State 27–0)

Second quarter
No scoring plays
Third quarter

- (9:42) BALL – Yo'Heinz Tyler 48 yard pass from Drew Plitt, Jacob Lewis kick (Drive: 3 plays, 49 yards, 1:12; Ball State 34–0)
- (9:28) SJSU – Charlie Bostic 99 yard kickoff return, 2-point pass failed (Ball State 34–6)
- (0:01) SJSU – Jermai Braddock 8 yard pass from Nick Starkel, Matt Mercurio kick (Drive: 8 plays, 67 yards, 3:08; Ball State 34–13)

Fourth quarter
No scoring plays

Passing

- BSU – Drew Plitt – 12/19, 217 yards, TD
- SJSU – Nick Starkel – 25/42, 268 yards, TD, 3 INT

Rushing

- BSU – Will Jones – 22 carries, 89 yards, TD
- SJSU – Tyler Nevens – 7 carries, 37 yards

Receiving

- BSU – Yo'Heinz Tyler – 4 receptions, 103 yards, TD
- SJSU – Tre Walker – 7 receptions, 81 yards

Win Probability

Line

- SJSU -9.5

Over/Under

- 64

== Rankings ==
On November 8, San Jose State received votes in the Coaches Poll for the first time since Week 2 of 2013. Then on November 15, San Jose State received votes in the AP Poll for the first time since being ranked no. 21 in the final 2012 season poll. This led to the Spartans cracking the College Football Playoff Top 25 for the first time, ranking no. 24 on Dec. 15, 2020.

Ranking movements Legend: ██ Increase in ranking ██ Decrease in ranking — = Not ranked RV = Received votes
	Week																	
Poll	Pre	1	2	3	4	5	6	7	8	9	10	11	12	13	14	15	16	Final
AP	—	—	—	—	—	—	—	—	—	—	—	RV	RV	RV	RV	25	19	24
Coaches	—	—	—	—	—	—	—	—	—	—	RV	RV	RV	RV	RV	25	20	24
CFP	Not released												—	—	—	24	22	Not released

== Depth chart ==
†	As of November 28, 2020

Defense

FS
Tre Jenkins
Jay Lenard
⋅

LB	LB	LB	LB
Hadari Darden	Kyle Harmon	Tysyn Parker	Alii Matau
Dion Leonard	Isaʻako Togia	Rahyme Johnson	Christian Webb
⋅	⋅	Jordan Cobbs	Rico Tolefree

SS
Tre Webb
B. J. Johnson
⋅

CB
Nehemiah Shelton
Charlie Bostic
Malik Welch

DE	NT	DE
Viliami Fehoko	Jay Kavika	Cade Hall
Noah Right	Lando Grey	E. J. Ane
Sinjun Astani	Soane Toia	Christian Johnson

CB
Kenyon Reed
Tre White
Mikale Greer

Offense

WR
Tre Walker
Vincent Corso
Jamar Simpson

WR
Isaiah Hamilton
Isaiah Holiness
Andre Crump Jr.

LT	LG	C	RG	RT
Jackson Snyder	Jesse Chamberlain	Kyle Hoppe	Tyler Stevens	Jaime Navarro
John Weiss	Trevor Robbins	Trevor Robbins	Anthony Pardue	Scott Breslin
⋅	⋅	⋅	Tyler Ostrom	⋅

TE
Derrick Deese Jr.
Billy Bob Humphreys
Dominick Mazotti

WR
Bailey Gaither
Jermaine Braddock
Malikhi Miller

QB
Nick Starkel
Nick Nash
⋅

RB
Kairee Robinson
OR
Tyler Nevens
Isaiah Holiness
Shamar Garrett

Special teams
PK Matt Mercurio
P Elijah Fischer
KR Shamar Garrett
PR Bailey Gaither
LS Andrew Gonneville
H Elijah Fischer

== Awards and honors ==
=== Individual Honors ===
- Mountain West Conference Coach of the Year

Brent Brennan

- Mountain West Conference Defensive Player of the Year

Cade Hall, DL

=== All-American Selections ===
Cade Hall, DL (TSN, USAT)

=== All-Mountain West Conference Team Selections ===
All-Conference Honors
Player	Position	Honor
Bailey Gaither	WR	1st Team
Jack Snyder	OL	1st Team
Cade Hall	DL	1st Team
Viliami Fehoko	DL	1st Team
Kyle Harmon	LB	1st Team
Nick Starkel	QB	2nd Team
Tre Walker	WR	2nd Team
Tre Jenkins	DB	2nd Team
Derrick Deese Jr.	TE	Honorable Mention
Matt Mercurio	PK	Honorable Mention
Tre Webb	DB	Honorable Mention

Ref:
