= 2020 Air Force Falcons football team =

American college football season

2020 Air Force Falcons football
- Conference: Mountain West Conference
- Record: 3–3 (2–2 MW)
- Head coach: Troy Calhoun (14th season)
- Offensive coordinator: Mike Thiessen (12th season)
- Offensive scheme: Triple option
- Defensive coordinator: John Rudzinski (3rd season)
- Base defense: Multiple
- Captain: Game captains
- Home stadium: Falcon Stadium

Uniform
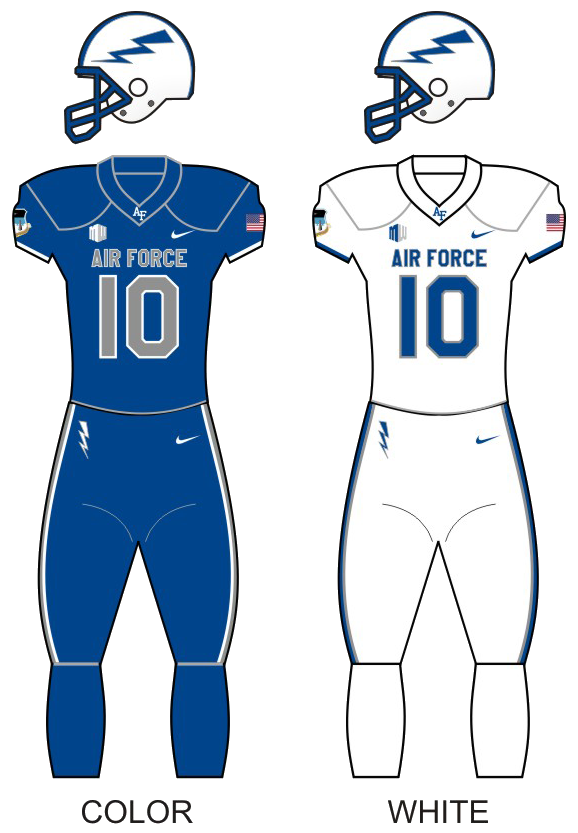

2020 Mountain West Conference football standings
	Conf.			Overall
Team	W		L	W		L
No. 24 San Jose State y$	6	–	0	7	–	1
Boise State y	5	–	0	5	–	2
Nevada	6	–	2	7	–	2
San Diego State	4	–	2	4	–	4
Hawaii	4	–	4	5	–	4
Fresno State	3	–	3	3	–	3
Air Force	2	–	2	3	–	3
Wyoming	2	–	4	2	–	4
New Mexico	2	–	5	2	–	5
Colorado State	1	–	3	1	–	3
Utah State	1	–	5	1	–	5
UNLV	0	–	6	0	–	6
Championship: San Jose State 34, Boise State 20
$ – Conference champion; y – Championship game participant; Note: Due to COVID-19, the Mountain West suspended the season, but later decided to begin play on October 24.; Rankings from AP Poll

The 2020 Air Force Falcons football team represented the United States Air Force Academy as a member of the Mountain West Conference (MW) during 2020 NCAA Division I FBS football season. Led by 14th-year head coach Troy Calhoun, the Falcons compiled an overall record of 3–3 with a mark of 2–2 in conference play, placing in a three-way tie for fifth in the MW. The team played home games at Falcon Stadium in Colorado Springs, Colorado

== Schedule ==
Air Force announced its 2020 football schedule on February 27, 2020. The original 2020 schedule consisted of 6 home and 6 away games in the regular season. On August 10, 2020, the Mountain West Conference announced the suspension of the football season due to the COVID-19 pandemic. Due to the nature of their institutions and rivalries, Air Force kept scheduled games with Army and Navy in order to play for the Commander-in-Chief's Trophy in the fall. Scheduled games against Duquesne and Purdue from the original schedule were canceled and Mountain West Conference play was suspended. On September 25, the Mountain West announced that their Board of Directors had met and approved plans to resume the football season. The revised schedule was announced on October 1, with conference play beginning on October 24. The Falcons had six conference games scheduled, two less than their MW counterparts to account for their service academy match-ups. The Army game, originally scheduled for November 7, was postponed indefinitely on November 5 with both schools saying they would reschedule the game if possible. The Wyoming game, originally scheduled for November 14, was canceled on November 8. The Colorado State game, originally scheduled for November 26, was canceled on November 25. On that same day, the Air Force-Army game was rescheduled for December 19 at Michie Stadium.

Date	Time	Opponent	Site	TV	Result	Attendance
October 3	4:00 p.m.	Navy*	Falcon Stadium; Colorado Springs, CO (Commander-in-Chief's Trophy)	CBSSN	W 40–7	5,000
October 24	8:30 p.m.	at San Jose State	CEFCU Stadium; San Jose, CA	FS1	L 6–17	0
October 31	4:00 p.m.	No. 25 Boise State	Falcon Stadium; Colorado Springs, CO	CBSSN	L 30–49	500
November 14	8:00 p.m.	at Wyoming	War Memorial Stadium; Laramie, WY	CBSSN	No contest	
November 20	7:30 p.m.	New Mexico	Falcon Stadium; Colorado Springs, CO	FS1	W 28–0	100
November 26	12:00 p.m.	Colorado State	Falcon Stadium; Colorado Springs, CO (rivalry)	CBSSN	No contest	
December 3	7:30 p.m.	at Utah State	Maverik Stadium; Logan, UT	CBSSN	W 35–7	3,025
December 19	1:00 p.m.	at Army*	Michie Stadium; West Point, NY (Commander-in-Chief's Trophy)	CBSSN	L 7–10	1,306
*Non-conference game; Rankings from AP Poll and CFP Rankings (after November 24) released prior to game; All times are in Mountain time

== Preseason ==
=== Award watch lists ===
Listed in the order that they were released

Award	Player	Position	Year
Lott IMPACT Trophy	Demonte Meeks	LB	SR
Davey O'Brien Award	Donald Hammond III	QB	SR
Outland Trophy	Parker Ferguson	OL	SR
Outland Trophy	Nolan Laufenberg	OL	SR
Johnny Unitas Golden Arm Award	Donald Hammond III	QB	SR

=== Mountain West media days ===
The Mountain West media days were originally scheduled to take place from July 27–29, 2020, virtually, but were canceled.

==== Media poll ====
The preseason poll was released on July 21, 2020. The Falcons were predicted to finish in third place in the MW Mountain Division. The divisions were later suspended for the 2020 season.

Mountain
Predicted finish	Team	Votes (1st place)
1	Boise State	125 (20)
2	Wyoming	90 (1)
3	Air Force	86
4	Utah State	60
5	Colorado State	59
6	New Mexico	21

West
Predicted finish	Team	Votes (1st place)
1	San Diego State	122 (19)
2	Nevada	100 (2)
3	Hawaii	74
4	Fresno State	73
5	San Jose State	43
6	UNLV	29

==== Preseason All−Mountain West Team ====
The Falcons had three players selected to the preseason All−Mountain West Team; two from the offense and one from the defense.

Offense

Parker Ferguson – OL

Nolan Laufenberg – OL

Defense

Demonte Meeks – LB

== Game summaries ==
=== Navy ===
Navy Midshipmen at Air Force Falcons

Quarter	1	2	3	4	Total
Midshipmen	0	7	0	0	7
Falcons	3	13	3	21	40

at Falcon Stadium, Colorado Springs, CO

- Date: October 3, 2020
- Game time: 4:00 p.m. MDT
- Game weather: Temperature: 64 °F (18 °C) • Wind: SSE 8 mph • Weather: Sunny
- Game attendance: 5,000
- Referee: Luke Richmond
- TV announcers (CBSSN): Carter Blackburn (play-by-play), Aaron Taylor (analyst) & Jenny Dell (sideline)
- ESPN – Air Force kicker, defense pave way to 40–7 win over Navy /// Box Score, Navy at Air Force /// Pregame Notes /// Postgame Notes

Game information

First Quarter

- (07:44) AF FG – Tevye Schuettpelz-Rohl 48-yard field goal
  Drive: 7 plays, 35 yards, 3:49; Air Force 3–0

Second Quarter

- (14:50) NAVY TD – Myles Fells 73-yard pass from Tyger Goslin, Bijan Nichols kick
  Drive: 2 plays, 75 yards, 0:13; Navy 7–3
- (10:58) AF TD – Haaziq Daniels 1-yard rush, Tevye Schuettpelz-Rohl kick
  Drive: 8 plays, 75 yards, 3:52; Air Force 10–7
- (06:36) AF FG – Tevye Schuettpelz-Rohl 35-yard field goal
  Drive: 5 plays, 12 yards, 2:01; Air Force 13–7
- (00:00) AF FG – Tevye Schuettpelz-Rohl 32-yard field goal
  Drive: 12 plays, 66 yards, 4:28; Air Force 16–7

Third Quarter

- (11:45) AF FG – Tevye Schuettpelz-Rohl 40-yard field goal
  Drive: 6 plays, 52 yards, 3:15; Air Force 19–7

Fourth Quarter

- (12:08) AF TD – Matthew Murla 2-yard rush, Tevye Schuettpelz-Rohl kick
  Drive: 7 plays, 74 yards, 3:28; Air Force 26–7
- (09:14) AF TD – Brad Roberts 2-yard rush, Tevye Schuettpelz-Rohl kick
  Drive: 4 plays, 29 yards, 2:12; Air Force 33–7
- (03:50) AF TD – Warren Bryan 1-yard rush, Anthony Rodriguez kick
  Drive: 5 plays, 38 yards, 2:40; Air Force 40–7

Passing

- NAVY – Tyger Goslin: 6/15, 137 yards, 1 TD
- AF – Haaziq Daniels: 4/9, 41 yards

Rushing

- NAVY – Nelson Smith: 7 carries, 25 yards
- AF – Timothy Jackson: 19 carries, 118 yards

Receiving

- NAVY – Myles Fells: 1 reception, 73 yards, 1 TD
- AF – Daniel Morris: 3 receptions, 29 yards

Defense

- NAVY – J'arius Warren: 10 total tackles (5 solo, 5 assisted), 1 sack, 1 tackle for loss, 1 forced fumble
- AF – George Silvanic: 7 total tackles (2 solo, 5 assisted), 1.5 sacks, 1.5 tackles for loss

Statistics	NAVY	AF
First downs	10	25
3rd down efficiency	5–13	2–9
4th down efficiency	1–3	0–0
Plays–yards	54–241	62–410
Rushes–yards	36–90	53–369
Passing yards	151	41
Passing: Comp–Att–Int	8–18–1	4–9–0
Penalties–yards	4–30	3–23
Turnovers	2	0
Time of possession	25:52	34:08

=== At San Jose State ===
Air Force Falcons at San Jose State Spartans

Quarter	1	2	3	4	Total
Falcons	0	0	0	6	6
Spartans	0	0	14	3	17

at CEFCU Stadium, San Jose, CA

- Date: October 24, 2020
- Game time: 7:30 p.m. PDT
- Game weather: Temperature: 62 °F (17 °C) • Wind: NNW 7 mph • Weather: Clear
- Game attendance: 0
- Referee: Scott Campbell
- TV announcers (FS1): Alex Faust (play-by-play) & Petros Papadakis (analyst)
- ESPN – Air Force Falcons at San Jose State Spartans /// Box Score, Air Force at San Jose State /// Pregame Notes /// Postgame Notes

Game information

First Quarter

No scoring

Second Quarter

No scoring

Third Quarter

- (06:48) SJSU TD – Derrick Deese Jr. 7-yard pass from Nick Starkel, Matt Mercurio kick
  Drive: 9 plays, 92 yards, 4:30; San Jose State 7–0
- (00:43) SJSU TD – Derrick Deese Jr. 11-yard pass from Nick Starkel, Matt Mercurio kick
  Drive: 3 plays, 14 yards, 1:24; San Jose State 14–0

Fourth Quarter

- (13:16) AF TD – Kyle Patterson 34-yard pass from Haaziq Daniels, Haaziq Daniels rush failed
  Drive: 6 plays, 65 yards, 2:27; San Jose State 14–6
- (05:18) SJSU FG – Matt Mercurio 30-yard field goal
  Drive: 15 plays, 78 yards, 7:50; San Jose State 17–6

Passing

- AF – Haaziq Daniels: 9/17, 92 yards, 1 TD
- SJSU – Nick Starkel: 22/29, 226 yards, 2 TD, 1 INT

Rushing

- AF – Brandon Lewis: 9 carries, 60 yards
- SJSU – Kairee Robinson: 12 carries, 31 yards

Receiving

- AF – Kyle Patterson: 3 receptions, 56 yards, 1 TD
- SJSU – Bailey Gaither: 8 receptions, 110 yards

Defense

- AF – Elisha Palm: 9 total tackles (8 solo, 1 assisted), 1.5 tackles for loss, 1 interception, 1 pass break-up
- SJSU – Kyle Harmon: 14 total tackles (8 solo, 6 assisted), 1 tackle for loss, 1 forced fumble, 1 pass break-up

Statistics	AF	SJSU
First downs	17	19
3rd down efficiency	9–16	5–12
4th down efficiency	1–2	0–1
Plays–yards	66–298	59–294
Rushes–yards	49–206	30–68
Passing yards	92	226
Passing: Comp–Att–Int	9–17–0	22–29–1
Penalties–yards	4–55	6–45
Turnovers	2	1
Time of possession	29:24	30:36

=== Boise State ===
No. 25 Boise State Broncos at Air Force Falcons

Quarter	1	2	3	4	Total
No. 25 Broncos	7	21	7	14	49
Falcons	14	3	0	13	30

at Falcon Stadium, Colorado Springs, CO

- Date: October 31, 2020
- Game time: 4:00 p.m. MDT
- Game weather: Temperature: 55 °F (13 °C) • Wind: N 17 mph • Weather: Sunny
- Game attendance: 500
- Referee: Brandon Cruse
- TV announcers (CBSSN): Carter Blackburn (play-by-play), Aaron Taylor (analyst) & Jenny Dell (sideline)
- ESPN – No. 25 Boise State Broncos at Air Force Falcons /// Box Score, No. 25 Boise State at Air Force /// Pregame Notes /// Postgame Notes

Game information

First Quarter

- (14:50) BSU TD – CT Thomas 75-yard pass from Jack Sears, Jonah Dalmas kick
  Drive: 1 play, 75 yards, 0:10; Boise State 7–0
- (09:27) AF TD – Brandon Lewis 7-yard rush, Tevye Schuettpelz-Rohl kick
  Drive: 9 plays, 75 yards, 5:23; Tied 7–7
- (03:23) AF TD – Matthew Murla 1-yard rush, Tevye Schuettpelz-Rohl kick
  Drive: 6 plays, 87 yards, 2:50; Air Force 14–7

Second Quarter

- (13:14) BSU TD – Andrew Van Buren 4-yard rush, Jonah Dalmas kick
  Drive: 10 plays, 78 yards, 5:03; Tied 14–14
- (06:53) AF FG – Tevye Schuettpelz-Rohl 31-yard field goal
  Drive: 11 plays, 61 yards, 6:21; Air Force 17–14
- (02:27) BSU TD – Andrew Van Buren 1-yard rush, Jonah Dalmas kick
  Drive: 9 plays, 64 yards, 4:21; Boise State 21–17
- (00:47) BSU TD – Octavius Evans 21-yard pass from Jack Sears, Jonah Dalmas kick
  Drive: 5 plays, 63 yards, 0:35; Boise State 28–17

Third Quarter

- (00:54) BSU TD – CT Thomas 26-yard pass from Jack Sears, Jonah Dalmas kick
  Drive: 6 plays, 78 yards, 3:08; Boise State 35–17

Fourth Quarter

- (11:24) AF TD – Matthew Murla 7-yard rush, Tevye Schuettpelz-Rohl kick
  Drive: 12 plays, 75 yards, 4:30; Boise State 35–24
- (11:13) BSU TD – Avery Williams 88-yard kickoff return, Jonah Dalmas kick
  Drive: 0 plays, 0 yards, 0:00; Boise State 42–24
- (07:24) BSU TD – Jack Sears 1-yard rush, Jonah Dalmas kick
  Drive: 6 plays, 63 yards, 2:35; Boise State 49–24
- (02:04) AF TD – Bo Gross 5-yard rush, Ben Brittain rush failed
  Drive: 10 plays, 75 yards, 5:20; Boise State 49–30

Passing

- BSU – Jack Sears: 17/20, 280 yards, 3 TD
- AF – Warren Bryan: 3/6, 38 yards

Rushing

- BSU – Andrew Van Buren: 12 carries, 70 yards, 2 TD
- AF – Brandon Lewis: 10 carries, 112 yards, 1 TD

Receiving

- BSU – CT Thomas: 2 receptions, 101 yards, 2 TD
- AF – Kyle Patterson: 3 receptions, 38 yards

Defense

- BSU – Keeghan Freeborn: 9 total tackles (5 solo, 4 assisted), 1 quarterback hurry
- AF – Elisha Palm: 8 total tackles (7 solo, 1 assisted)

Statistics	BSU	AF
First downs	23	28
3rd down efficiency	2–4	4–12
4th down efficiency	0–0	3–3
Plays–yards	49–459	73–484
Rushes–yards	29–179	66–415
Passing yards	280	69
Passing: Comp–Att–Int	17–20–0	4–7–0
Penalties–yards	3–40	6–43
Turnovers	0	0
Time of possession	22:29	37:31

=== At Wyoming ===
CANCELLED – ~~Air Force Falcons at Wyoming Cowboys~~

Quarter	1	2	Total
~~Falcons~~			0
~~Cowboys~~			0

at ~~War Memorial Stadium, Laramie, WY~~

- Date: ~~November 14, 2020~~
- Game time: ~~8:00 p.m. MST~~
- TV: ~~CBSSN~~
- ~~ESPN – Air Force Falcons at Wyoming Cowboys~~

=== New Mexico ===
New Mexico Lobos at Air Force Falcons

Quarter	1	2	3	4	Total
Lobos	0	0	0	0	0
Falcons	7	14	0	7	28

at Falcon Stadium, Colorado Springs, CO

- Date: November 20, 2020
- Game time: 7:30 p.m. MST
- Game weather: Temperature: 37 °F (3 °C) • Wind: S 6 mph • Weather: Mostly Cloudy
- Game attendance: 100
- Referee: C. Watson
- TV announcers (FS1): Alex Faust (play-by-play) & Petros Papadakis (analyst)
- ESPN – New Mexico Lobos at Air Force Falcons /// Box Score, New Mexico at Air Force /// Pregame Notes /// Postgame Notes

Game information

First Quarter

- (05:07) AF TD – Haaziq Daniels 4-yard rush, Tevye Schuettpelz-Rohl kick
  Drive: 11 plays, 86 yards, 5:55; Air Force 7–0

Second Quarter

- (14:28) AF TD – Brad Roberts 5-yard rush, Tevye Schuettpelz-Rohl kick
  Drive: 10 plays, 72 yards, 4:48; Air Force 14–0
- (06:13) AF TD – Brad Roberts 12-yard rush, Tevye Schuettpelz-Rohl kick
  Drive: 9 plays, 66 yards, 5:07; Air Force 21–0

Third Quarter

No scoring

Fourth Quarter

- (05:38) AF TD – Brad Roberts 44-yard rush, Tevye Schuettpelz-Rohl kick
  Drive: 1 play, 44 yards, 0:09; Air Force 28–0

Passing

- NM – Trae Hall: 23/42, 221 yards, 1 INT
- AF – Haaziq Daniels: 4/5, 66 yards

Rushing

- NM – Nathaniel Jones: 6 carries, 29 yards
- AF – Brad Roberts: 28 carries, 177 yards, 3 TD

Receiving

- NM – Emmanuel Logan-Greene: 3 receptions, 64 yards
- AF – Kyle Patterson: 2 receptions, 34 yards

Defense

- NM – Brandon Shook: 19 total tackles (11 solo, 8 assisted)
- AF – Johnathan Youngblood: 8 total tackles (2 solo, 6 assisted), 1 tackle for loss, 2 quarterback hurries

Statistics	NM	AF
First downs	19	23
3rd down efficiency	4–13	9–13
4th down efficiency	0–1	1–2
Plays–yards	67–304	68–422
Rushes–yards	25–83	63–356
Passing yards	221	66
Passing: Comp–Att–Int	23–42–1	4–5–0
Penalties–yards	8–70	5–42
Turnovers	2	3
Time of possession	23:31	36:29

=== Colorado State ===
CANCELLED – ~~Colorado State Rams at Air Force Falcons~~

Quarter	1	2	Total
~~Rams~~			0
~~Falcons~~			0

at ~~Falcon Stadium, Colorado Springs, CO~~

- Date: ~~November 26, 2020~~
- Game time: ~~12:00 p.m. MST~~
- TV: ~~CBSSN~~
- ~~ESPN – Colorado State Rams at Air Force Falcons Preview~~

=== At Utah State ===
Air Force Falcons at Utah State Aggies

Quarter	1	2	3	4	Total
Falcons	7	14	7	7	35
Aggies	7	0	0	0	7

at Maverik Stadium, Logan, UT

- Date: December 3, 2020
- Game time: 7:30 p.m. MST
- Game weather: Temperature: 25 °F (−4 °C) • Weather: Clear and Chilly
- Game attendance: 3,025
- Referee: Mike Cuttone
- TV announcers (CBSSN): Ed Cohen (play-by-play) & Ross Tucker (analyst)
- ESPN – Air Force runs over Utah State 35–7 behind Daniels /// Box Score, Air Force at Utah State /// Pregame Notes /// Postgame Notes

Game information

First Quarter

- (06:56) USU TD – Jordan Nathan 4-yard pass from Andrew Peasley, Connor Coles kick
  Drive: 15 plays, 65 yards, 8:04; Utah State 7–0
- (00:39) AF TD – Kadin Remsberg 21-yard rush, Tevye Schuettpelz-Rohl kick
  Drive: 11 plays, 75 yards, 6:17; Tied 7–7

Second Quarter

- (09:32) AF TD – Ben Peterson 49-yard pass from Haaziq Daniels, Tevye Schuettpelz-Rohl kick
  Drive: 6 plays, 82 yards, 3:03; Air Force 14–7
- (00:52) AF TD – Haaziq Daniels 37-yard rush, Tevye Schuettpelz-Rohl kick
  Drive: 8 plays, 99 yards, 3:33; Air Force 21–7

Third Quarter

- (04:43) AF TD – Matthew Murla 1-yard rush, Tevye Schuettpelz-Rohl kick
  Drive: 11 plays, 71 yards, 5:57; Air Force 28–7

Fourth Quarter

- (12:12) AF TD – Brad Roberts 15-yard rush, Tevye Schuettpelz-Rohl kick
  Drive: 9 plays, 83 yards, 5:04; Air Force 35–7

Passing

- AF – Haaziq Daniels: 7/9, 127 yards, 1 TD
- USU – Andrew Peasley: 17/32, 123 yards, 1 TD, 2 INT

Rushing

- AF – Kadin Remsberg: 11 carries, 107 yards, 1 TD
- USU – Andrew Peasley: 8 carries, 53 yards

Receiving

- AF – Ben Peterson: 2 receptions, 73 yards, 1 TD
- USU – Carson Terrell: 2 receptions, 27 yards

Defense

- AF – Matthew Malloy: 6 total tackles (3 solo, 3 assisted), 1 sack, 1 tackle for loss, 1 interception
- USU – Nick Heninger: 14 total tackles (4 solo, 10 assisted)

Statistics	AF	USU
First downs	24	14
3rd down efficiency	5–10	9–14
4th down efficiency	3–4	0–2
Plays–yards	64–461	58–232
Rushes–yards	55–334	26–109
Passing yards	127	123
Passing: Comp–Att–Int	7–9–0	17–32–2
Penalties–yards	6–67	6–65
Turnovers	0	2
Time of possession	34:54	25:06

=== At Army ===
Air Force Falcons at Army Black Knights

Quarter	1	2	3	4	Total
Falcons	0	0	7	0	7
Black Knights	0	3	0	7	10

at Michie Stadium, West Point, NY

- Date: December 19, 2020
- Game time: 3:00 p.m. EST
- Game attendance: 1,306
- Referee: Brad Van Vark
- TV announcers (CBSSN): Dave Ryan (play-by-play), Ross Tucker (analyst) & Tina Cervasio (sideline)
- ESPN – Army beats Air Force 10–7, wins Commander-in-Chief's Trophy /// Box Score, Air Force at Army /// Pregame Notes /// Postgame Notes

Game information

First Quarter

No Scoring

Second Quarter

- (11:23) ARMY FG: Quinn Maretzki 24-yard field goal
  Drive: 20 plays, 73 yards, 10:02; Army 3–0

Third Quarter

- (00:15) AF TD: Kyle Patterson 10-yard pass from Haaziq Daniels, Anthony Rodriguez kick
  Drive: 10 plays, 87 yards, 5:01; Air Force 7–3

Fourth Quarter

- (01:13) ARMY TD: Jakobi Buchanan 1-yard rush, Quinn Maretzki kick
  Drive: 16 plays, 80 yards, 7:11; Army 10–7

Passing

- AF – Haaziq Daniels: 6/14, 107 yards, 1 TD, 3 INT
- ARMY – Christian Anderson: 1/1, 0 yards

Rushing

- AF – Brad Roberts: 11 carries, 83 yards
- ARMY – Jakobi Buchanan: 21 carries, 86 yards, 1 TD

Receiving

- AF – Kyle Patterson: 3 receptions, 65 yards, 1 TD
- ARMY – Tyrell Robinson: 1 reception, 0 yards

Defense

- AF – Will Trawick: 14 total tackles (2 solo, 12 assisted), 0.5 tackles for loss, 1 fumble recovery
- ARMY – Jon Rhattigan: 7 total tackles (4 solo, 3 assisted)

Statistics	AF	ARMY
First downs	11	21
3rd down efficiency	4–8	9–17
4th down efficiency	0–0	2–3
Plays–yards	40–261	73–290
Rushes–yards	26–154	71–290
Passing yards	107	0
Passing: Comp–Att–Int	6–14–3	1–2–0
Penalties–yards	3–15	2–15
Turnovers	3	1
Time of possession	22:34	37:26

== Roster ==
2020 Air Force Falcons football team roster
Players			Coaches
Offense: Pos. / # / Name / Class	Defense: Pos. / # / Name / Class	Special teams: Pos. / # / Name / Class	Head coach Coordinators/assistant coaches: Curome Cox – Defensive backs; Legend: (C) Team captain; (S) Suspended; (I) Ineligible; Injured; Redshirt; Roster
