= 2020 Utah State Aggies football team =

American college football season

2020 Utah State Aggies football
- Conference: Mountain West Conference
- Record: 1–5 (1–5 MW)
- Head coach: Gary Andersen (6th season; first three games); Frank Maile (interim; remainder of season)
- Offensive coordinator: Bodie Reeder (1st season)
- Offensive scheme: Spread
- Co-defensive coordinators: Frank Maile (4th season); Stacy Collins (1st season)
- Base defense: Multiple

Uniform
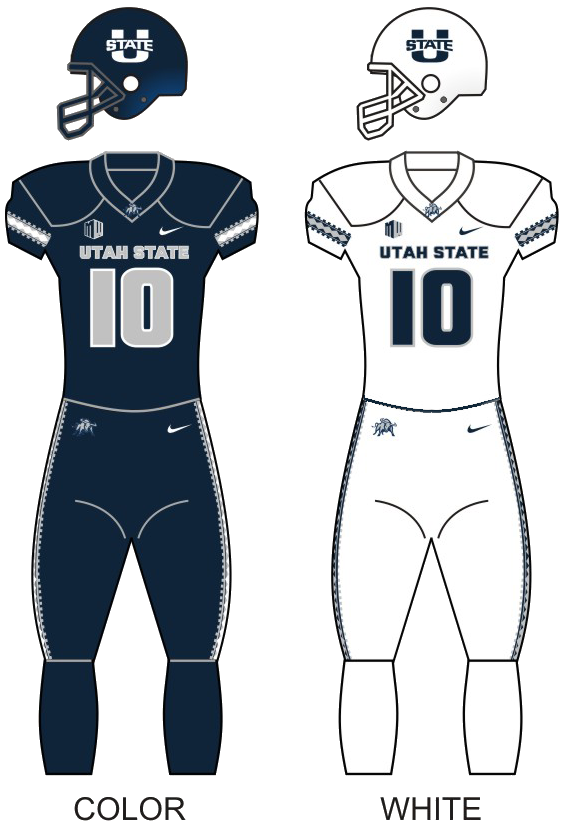

2020 Mountain West Conference football standings
	Conf.			Overall
Team	W		L	W		L
No. 24 San Jose State y$	6	–	0	7	–	1
Boise State y	5	–	0	5	–	2
Nevada	6	–	2	7	–	2
San Diego State	4	–	2	4	–	4
Hawaii	4	–	4	5	–	4
Fresno State	3	–	3	3	–	3
Air Force	2	–	2	3	–	3
Wyoming	2	–	4	2	–	4
New Mexico	2	–	5	2	–	5
Colorado State	1	–	3	1	–	3
Utah State	1	–	5	1	–	5
UNLV	0	–	6	0	–	6
Championship: San Jose State 34, Boise State 20
$ – Conference champion; y – Championship game participant; Note: Due to COVID-19, the Mountain West suspended the season, but later decided to begin play on October 24.; Rankings from AP Poll

The 2020 Utah State Aggies football team represented Utah State University in the 2020 NCAA Division I FBS football season. The Aggies played their home games at Maverik Stadium in Logan, Utah as members of the Mountain West Conference. Head coach Gary Andersen, who was in his second year back at Utah State (sixth overall), coached the first three games before he was fired after going 0–3. Co-defensive coordinator Frank Maile was named interim head coach. In a season limited due to the ongoing COVID-19 pandemic, the Aggies finished the conference-only season 1–5 to finish in 11th place in Mountain West play.

Following the season, the school announced Arkansas State head coach Blake Anderson would become the team's new head coach.

The final scheduled game of the season was canceled due to a Utah State player boycott.

== Schedule ==
Utah State announced its 2020 football schedule on February 27, 2020. The 2020 schedule consisted of six home and six away games in the regular season. On August 10, 2020, the Mountain West Conference announced the suspension of the football season due to the COVID-19 pandemic.

On September 25, the Mountain West announced the 2020 season would return with a revised eight-game, conference-only season beginning October 24. On November 18, the scheduled November 19 game against Wyoming was canceled by the Mountain West Conference due to rising COVID-19 cases in the Utah State program. On December 11, the scheduled December 12 at Colorado State was canceled as a result of a Utah State player boycott in protest of comments made by their university president that they perceived as discriminatory.

Date	Time	Opponent	Site	TV	Result	Attendance
October 24	5:00 p.m.	at Boise State	Albertsons Stadium; Boise, ID	FS1	L 13–42	0
October 31	7:30 p.m.	San Diego State	Maverik Stadium; Logan, UT	CBSSN	L 7–38	5,116
November 5	5:00 p.m.	at Nevada	Mackay Stadium; Reno, NV	FS1	L 9–34	250
November 14	12:30 p.m.	Fresno State^{†}	Maverik Stadium; Logan, UT	FS2	L 16–35	0
November 19	7:00 p.m.	at Wyoming	War Memorial Stadium; Laramie, WY		Cancelled	
November 26	5:00 p.m.	New Mexico	Maverik Stadium; Logan, UT	FS1	W 41–27	198
December 3	7:30 p.m.	Air Force	Maverik Stadium; Logan, UT	CBSSN	L 7–35	3,025
December 12	7:30 p.m.	at Colorado State	Canvas Stadium; Fort Collins, CO	CBSSN	Cancelled	
^{†}Homecoming; All times are in Mountain time

== Player boycott of final game ==
On December 11, a day before the scheduled final game of the season, it was reported that Blake Anderson would be named the team's new head coach. As a result of the announcement of the hire of Anderson and racially and religiously insensitive comments allegedly made by Utah State president Noelle Cockett, the Aggie players announced a boycott of the final game. The players had announced their support for the retention of interim head coach Maile, but were allegedly told by Cockett that Maile's religious and cultural background was a problem. Maile is of Polynesian descent and a Mormon. The players reported that it was not the first time issues of discrimination had occurred, citing a 2019 issue where the team's head equipment manager used a racial slur, but the manager ultimately continued his employment at the school.

== Personnel ==
=== Coaching staff ===
After an up-and-down year, various changes were made to the Aggie coaching staff. Offensive coordinator Mike Sanford left to take the same position at Minnesota, and was replaced by North Texas offensive coordinator Bodie Reeder. Defensive coordinator Justin Ena was reassigned as the inside linebackers coach. Frank Maile, assistant head coach and tight ends coach, was reassigned to defensive coordinator. He had previously been Utah State's defensive coordinator from 2016 to 2018. Stacy Collins, special teams and running backs coach, was named co-defensive coordinator with Maile. Bojay Filimoeatu was moved from defensive ends to outside linebackers. Dave Schramm, the offensive coordinator at Weber State, was hired as the new running backs coach. Safeties coach Mike Caputo was let go and is now at Baylor with former Utah State defensive coordinator Dave Aranda.

Name	Position	Alma mater	Joined staff
Gary Andersen	Head coach	Utah (1986)	2019 (previously 2009–2012)
Frank Maile	Co-Defensive Coordinator / Defensive Line	Utah State (2007)	2016 (previously 2009–2013)
Stacy Collins	Co-Defensive Coordinator / Secondary	Western Oregon (1998)	2016
Bodie Reeder	Offensive Coordinator / Quarterbacks	Eastern Illinois (2009)	2020
Justin Ena	Inside Linebackers	BYU (2001)	2019
T.J. Woods	Offensive Line	Azusa Pacific (2002)	2019 (previously 2009–2012)
Jason Phillips	Pass Game Coordinator / Wide Receivers	Houston (2001)	2019
Bojay Filimoeatu	Defensive Ends	Utah State (2012)	2019
Dave Schramm	Running Backs	Adams State (1983)	2020
Mark Orphey	Secondary	Texas Southern (2010)	2019
Jordan Hicks	Strength and Conditioning	Georgetown (KY) (2005)	2019
Keegan Andersen	Director of Player Personnel	Utah State (2013)	2019

== Game summaries ==
=== At Boise State ===
	1	2	3	4	Total
Aggies	0	0	7	6	13
Broncos	7	21	0	14	42

Statistics	USU	BSU
First downs	12	25
Total yards	203	450
Rushing yards	111	171
Passing yards	92	279
Turnovers	1	0
Time of possession	30:00	30:00

Team	Category	Player	Statistics
Utah State	Passing	Jason Shelley	14/27, 92 yards, INT
Utah State	Rushing	Jaylen Warren	23 rushes, 89 yards, 2 TD
Utah State	Receiving	Deven Thompkins	5 receptions, 37 yards
Boise State	Passing	Hank Bachmeier	20/28, 268 yards, 3 TD
Boise State	Rushing	George Holani	14 rushes, 100 yards, TD
Boise State	Receiving	Khalil Shakir	7 receptions, 123 yards, 2 TD

=== San Diego State ===
	1	2	3	4	Total
Aztecs	7	3	14	14	38
Aggies	0	7	0	0	7

Statistics	SDSU	USU
First downs	30	11
Total yards	570	215
Rushing yards	407	103
Passing yards	163	112
Turnovers	0	3
Time of possession	37:10	22:50

Team	Category	Player	Statistics
San Diego State	Passing	Carson Baker	18/27, 163 yards, 2 TD
San Diego State	Rushing	Greg Bell	22 rushes, 157 yards, TD
San Diego State	Receiving	Kobe Smith	6 receptions, 64 yards, TD
Utah State	Passing	Jason Shelley	13/21, 88 yards, TD, INT
Utah State	Rushing	Devonta'e Henry-Cole	11 rushes, 27 yards
Utah State	Receiving	Deven Thompkins	6 receptions, 55 yards, TD

=== At Nevada ===
	1	2	3	4	Total
Aggies	9	0	0	0	9
Wolf Pack	7	14	10	3	34

Statistics	USU	NEV
First downs	11	27
Total yards	210	542
Rushing yards	109	121
Passing yards	101	421
Turnovers	0	0
Time of possession	23:16	36:44

Team	Category	Player	Statistics
Utah State	Passing	Jason Shelley	15/27, 96 yards, TD
Utah State	Rushing	Jason Shelley	7 rushes, 34 yards
Utah State	Receiving	Deven Thompkins	6 receptions, 30 yards
Nevada	Passing	Carson Strong	36/52, 411 yards, 3 TD
Nevada	Rushing	Toa Taua	12 rushes, 107 yards, TD
Nevada	Receiving	Romeo Doubs	7 receptions, 137 yards, 3 TD

=== Fresno State ===
	1	2	3	4	Total
Bulldogs	7	21	0	7	35
Aggies	13	3	0	0	16

Statistics	FRES	USU
First downs	25	12
Total yards	541	343
Rushing yards	119	199
Passing yards	422	144
Turnovers	2	2
Time of possession	33:49	26:11

Team	Category	Player	Statistics
Fresno State	Passing	Jake Haener	29/38, 422 yards, 4 TD, INT
Fresno State	Rushing	Ronnie Rivers	25 rushes, 132 yards, TD
Fresno State	Receiving	Jalen Cropper	10 receptions, 202 yards, 3 TD
Utah State	Passing	Jason Shelley	9/24, 144 yards
Utah State	Rushing	Jaylen Warren	9 rushes, 136 yards, TD
Utah State	Receiving	Deven Thompkins	3 receptions, 92 yards

=== New Mexico ===
	1	2	3	4	Total
Lobos	3	10	7	7	27
Aggies	3	3	28	7	41

Statistics	UNM	USU
First downs	25	22
Total yards	348	452
Rushing yards	196	209
Passing yards	152	243
Turnovers	2	2
Time of possession	31:05	28:55

Team	Category	Player	Statistics
New Mexico	Passing	Trae Hall	11/21, 63 yards
New Mexico	Rushing	Trae Hall	13 rushes, 70 yards
New Mexico	Receiving	Andrew Erickson	5 receptions, 55 yards, TD
Utah State	Passing	Andrew Peasley	14/21, 239 yards, 3 TD
Utah State	Rushing	Andrew Peasley	11 rushes, 118 yards, TD
Utah State	Receiving	Justin McGriff	4 receptions, 99 yards, TD

=== Air Force ===
	1	2	3	4	Total
Falcons	7	14	7	7	35
Aggies	7	0	0	0	7

Statistics	AFA	USU
First downs	24	14
Total yards	461	232
Rushing yards	334	109
Passing yards	127	123
Turnovers	0	2
Time of possession	34:54	25:06

Team	Category	Player	Statistics
Air Force	Passing	Haaziq Daniels	7/9, 127 yards, TD
Air Force	Rushing	Kadin Remsberg	11 rushes, 107 yards, TD
Air Force	Receiving	Ben Peterson	2 receptions, 73 yards, TD
Utah State	Passing	Andrew Peasley	17/32, 123 yards, TD, 2 INT
Utah State	Rushing	Andrew Peasley	8 rushes, 53 yards
Utah State	Receiving	Carson Terrell	2 receptions, 27 yards
