= 2020 Fresno State Bulldogs football team =

American college football season

2020 Fresno State Bulldogs football
- Conference: Mountain West Conference
- Record: 3–3 (3–3 MW)
- Head coach: Kalen DeBoer (1st season)
- Offensive coordinator: Ryan Grubb (2nd season)
- Offensive scheme: Air raid
- Defensive coordinator: William Inge (1st season)
- Base defense: Multiple 4–2–5
- Home stadium: Bulldog Stadium

2020 Mountain West Conference football standings
	Conf.			Overall
Team	W		L	W		L
No. 24 San Jose State y$	6	–	0	7	–	1
Boise State y	5	–	0	5	–	2
Nevada	6	–	2	7	–	2
San Diego State	4	–	2	4	–	4
Hawaii	4	–	4	5	–	4
Fresno State	3	–	3	3	–	3
Air Force	2	–	2	3	–	3
Wyoming	2	–	4	2	–	4
New Mexico	2	–	5	2	–	5
Colorado State	1	–	3	1	–	3
Utah State	1	–	5	1	–	5
UNLV	0	–	6	0	–	6
Championship: San Jose State 34, Boise State 20
$ – Conference champion; y – Championship game participant; Note: Due to COVID-19, the Mountain West suspended the season, but later decided to begin play on October 24.; Rankings from AP Poll

The 2020 Fresno State Bulldogs football team represented California State University, Fresno in the 2020 NCAA Division I FBS football season. The Bulldogs were led by first–year head coach Kalen DeBoer and played their games at Bulldog Stadium as a member of the Mountain West Conference.

On August 10, 2020, the Mountain West Conference suspended all fall sports competitions due to the COVID-19 pandemic.

On September 24, 2020, the Mountain West Conference resumed all fall sports competitions.

== Schedule ==
Fresno State had non-conference games scheduled against Colorado and Texas A&M. They were canceled due to the COVID-19 pandemic.

On November 19, the game vs. San Jose State scheduled for November 21 was canceled because of a positive COVID-19 test and contact tracing within the Fresno State program.

On November 22, the game vs. San Diego State scheduled for November 27 was canceled due to COVID-19 protocols within the Fresno State football program.

Date	Time	Opponent	Site	TV	Result	Attendance
October 24	4:30 p.m.	Hawaii^{†}	Bulldog Stadium; Fresno, CA (rivalry)	KSEE	L 19–34	0
October 29	7:00 p.m.	Colorado State	Bulldog Stadium; Fresno, CA	CBSSN	W 38–17	0
November 7	12:30 p.m.	at UNLV	Allegiant Stadium; Paradise, NV	CBSSN	W 40–27	2,000
November 14	11:30 a.m.	at Utah State	Maverik Stadium; Logan, UT	FS2	W 35–16	0
November 21	4:00 p.m.	San Jose State	Bulldog Stadium; Fresno, CA (rivalry)	CBSSN	Cancelled	
November 27	6:00 p.m.	San Diego State	Bulldog Stadium; Fresno, CA (rivalry)	FS1	Cancelled	
December 5	6:00 p.m.	at Nevada	Mackay Stadium; Reno, NV	FS2	L 26–37	50
December 12	7:30 p.m.	at New Mexico	Sam Boyd Stadium; Whitney, NV	FS1	L 39–49	250
^{†}Homecoming; All times are in Pacific time

== Game summaries ==
=== Hawaii ===
Game One – Hawaii Rainbow Warriors (0–0) at Fresno State Bulldogs (0–0)

Quarter	1	2	3	4	Total
Rainbow Warriors	7	10	7	10	34
Bulldogs	7	6	3	3	19

at Bulldog Stadium • Fresno, California

- Date: Saturday, October 24, 2020
- Game time: 4:30 p.m. PST
- Game weather: Sunny • Temperature: 77 °F (25 °C) • Wind: NW 6 mph
- Game attendance: 0
- TV announcers (KSEE): Mark Demsky (play-by-play), Andrew Marden (analyst)

Game information

First quarter

- (11:34) FRES – Ronnie Rivers 7-yard run, Cesar Silva kick (Drive: 5 plays, 26 yards, 3:22; Fresno State 7–0)
- (4:00) HAW – Chevan Cordeiro 20-yard run, Matthew Shipley kick (Drive: 5 plays, 37 yards, 1:50; Tied 7–7)

Second quarter

- (7:12) HAW – Matthew Shipley 34-yard field goal (Drive: 13 plays, 73 yards, 5:37; Hawaii 10–7)
- (1:50) FRES – Juan Rodriguez 18-yard pass from Jake Haener, kick missed (Drive: 2 plays, 33 yards, 0:11; Fresno State 13–10)
- (0:27) HAW – Chevan Cordeiro 3-yard run, Matthew Shipley kick (Drive: 6 plays, 72 yards, 1:17; Hawaii 17–13)

Third quarter

- (6:18) HAW – Calvin Turner 2-yard run, Matthew Shipley kick (Drive: 14 plays, 76 yards, 6:31; Hawaii 24–13)
- (3:41) FRES – Cesar Silva 22-yard field goal (Drive: 7 plays, 70 yards, 2:37; Hawaii 24–16)

Fourth quarter

- (12:08) HAW – Matthew Shipley 24-yard field goal (Drive: 9 plays, 62 yards, 2:53; Hawaii 27–16)
- (10:13) FRES – Cesar Silva 25-yard field goal (Drive: 8 plays, 68 yards, 1:55; Hawaii 27–19)
- (4:52) HAW – Calvin Turner 4-yard run, Matthew Shipley kick (Drive: 12 plays, 70 yards, 5:15; Hawaii 34–19)

Statistics	HAW	FRES
First downs	27	22
Plays–yards	87–552	70–409
Rushes–yards	53–323	37–120
Passing yards	229	289
Passing: comp–att–int	20–30–0	17–31–3
Time of possession	32:56	27:04

Team	Category	Player	Statistics
Hawaii	Passing	Chevan Cordeiro	20/30, 239 yards
Hawaii	Rushing	Chevan Cordeiro	13 carries, 116 yards, 2 TD
Hawaii	Receiving	Jared Smart	7 receptions, 89 yards
Fresno State	Passing	Jake Haener	17/31, 289 yards TD, 3 INT
Fresno State	Rushing	Ronnie Rivers	18 carries, 79 yards, TD
Fresno State	Receiving	Keric Wheatfall	3 receptions, 73 yards

=== Colorado State ===
Game Two – Colorado State Rams (0–0) at Fresno State Bulldogs (0–1)

Quarter	1	2	3	4	Total
Rams	3	7	0	7	17
Bulldogs	7	17	7	7	38

at Bulldog Stadium • Fresno, California

- Date: Thursday, October 26, 2020
- Game time: 7:00 p.m. PST
- Game weather: Clear • Temperature: 66 °F (19 °C) • Wind: WNW 5 mph
- Game attendance: 0
- TV announcers (CBSSN): Ben Holden (play-by-play), Ross Tucker (analyst)

Game information

First quarter

- (6:44) FRES – Ronnie Rivers 13-yard pass from Jake Haener, Cesar Silva kick (Drive: 12 plays, 86 yards, 6:26; Fresno State 7–0)
- (4:07) CSU – Robert Liss 24-yard field goal (Drive: 9 plays, 72 yards, 2:32; Fresno State 7–3)

Second quarter

- (13:57) CSU – Marcus McElroy Jr. 15-yard run, Robert Liss kick (Drive: 10 plays, 81 yards, 3:24; Colorado State 10–7)
- (11:00) FRES – Cesar Silva 34-yard field goal (Drive: 8 plays, 60 yards, 2:50; Tied 10–10)
- (6:32) FRES – Ronnie Rivers 32-yard run, Cesar Silva kick (Drive: 6 plays, 68 yards, 2:38; Fresno State 17–10)
- (1:03) FRES – Jordan Mims 15-yard pass from Jake Haener, Cesar Silva kick (Drive: 10 plays, 91 yards, 3:14; Fresno State 24–10)

Third quarter

- (2:43) FRES – Ronnie Rivers 1-yard run, Cesar Silva kick (Drive: 12 plays, 67 yards, 4:56; Fresno State 31–10)

Fourth quarter

- (7:58) FRES – Jalen Cropper 6-yard pass from Jake Haener, Cesar Silva kick (Drive: 5 plays, 17 yards, 2:41; Fresno State 38–10)
- (0:41) CSU – Trey McBride 20-yard pass from Patrick O'Brien, Robert Liss kick (Drive: 5 plays, 36 yards, 1:15; Fresno State 38–17)

Statistics	CSU	FRES
First downs	21	24
Plays–yards	73–381	80–432
Rushes–yards	39–158	43–84
Passing yards	223	348
Passing: comp–att–int	17–33–0	25–36–0
Time of possession	24:10	35:50

Team	Category	Player	Statistics
Colorado State	Passing	Todd Centeio	10/23, 141 yards
Colorado State	Rushing	Todd Centeio	12 carries, 89 yards
Colorado State	Receiving	Trey McBride	8 receptions, 130 yards, TD
Fresno State	Passing	Jake Haener	22/32, 311 yards, 3 TD
Fresno State	Rushing	Ronnie Rivers	23 carries, 95 yards, 2 TD
Fresno State	Receiving	Keric Wheatfall	5 receptions, 87 yards

=== UNLV ===
Game Three – Fresno State Bulldogs (1–1) at UNLV Rebels (0–2)

Quarter	1	2	3	4	Total
Bulldogs	6	14	7	13	40
Rebels	7	10	10	0	27

at Allegiant Stadium • Paradise, Nevada

- Date: Saturday, November 7, 2020
- Game time: 12:30 p.m. PST
- Game weather: Windy • Temperature: 60 °F (16 °C) • Wind: SW 25 mph
- Game attendance: 2,000
- TV announcers (CBSSN): Ben Holden (play-by-play), Ross Tucker (analyst)

Game information

First quarter

- (10:20) FRES – Jake Haener 54-yard run, kick failed (Drive: 5 plays, 78 yards, 2:16; Fresno State 6–0)
- (6:11) UNLV – Charles Williams 2-yard run, Daniel Gutierrez kick (Drive: 12 plays, 74 yards, 4:05; UNLV 7–6)

Second quarter

- (11:39) UNLV – Daniel Gutierrez 28-yard field goal (Drive: 18 plays, 74 yards, 6:13; UNLV 10–6)
- (9:34) FRES – Ronnie Rivers 5-yard run, Cesar Silva kick (Drive: 5 plays, 73 yards, 1:58; Fresno State 13–10)
- (6:12) UNLV – Tyleek Collins 43-yard pass from Max Gilliam, Daniel Gutierrez kick (Drive: 8 plays, 69 yards, 3:13; UNLV 17–13)
- (1:25) FRES – Ronnie Rivers 33-yard pass from Jake Haener, Cesar Silva kick (Drive: 5 plays, 63 yards, 0:42; Fresno State 20–17)

Third quarter

- (13:24) FRES – Ronnie Rivers 16-yard run, Cesar Silva kick (Drive: 3 plays, 25 yards, 0:25; Fresno State 27–17)
- (6:35) UNLV – Daniel Gutierrez 20-yard field goal (Drive: 13 plays, 72 yards, 6:33; Fresno State 27–20)
- (3:41) UNLV – Max Gilliam 71-yard run, Daniel Gutierrez kick (Drive: 2 plays, 71 yards, 0:17; Tied 27–27)

Fourth quarter

- (14:55) FRES – Ronnie Rivers 10-yard run, Cesar Silva kick (Drive: 11 plays, 79 yards, 3:35; Fresno State 34–27)
- (7:14) FRES – Cesar Silva 35-yard field goal (Drive: 4 plays, 3 yards, 1:43; Fresno State 37–27)
- (1:51) FRES – Cesar Silva 31-yard field goal (Drive: 7 plays, 47 yards, 3:56; Fresno State 40–27)

Statistics	FRES	UNLV
First downs	22	19
Plays–yards	73–487	79–402
Rushes–yards	36–243	46–242
Passing yards	244	160
Passing: comp–att–int	20–35–0	15–31–2
Time of possession	29:35	30:25

Team	Category	Player	Statistics
Fresno State	Passing	Jake Haener	15/23, 164 yards, TD
Fresno State	Rushing	Ronnie Rivers	19 carries, 133 yards, 3 TD
Fresno State	Receiving	Ronnie Rivers	6 receptions, 99 yards, TD
UNLV	Passing	Max Gilliam	15/31, 160 yards, TD, 2 INT
UNLV	Rushing	Max Gilliam	16 carries, 139 yards, TD
UNLV	Receiving	Kyle Williams	5 receptions, 52 yards

=== Utah State ===
Game Four – Fresno State Bulldogs (2–1) at Utah State Aggies (0–3)

Quarter	1	2	3	4	Total
Bulldogs	7	21	0	7	35
Aggies	13	3	0	0	16

at Maverik Stadium • Logan, Utah

- Date: Saturday, November 14, 2020
- Game time: 11:30 a.m. PST
- Game weather: Cloudy • Temperature: 37 °F (3 °C) • Wind: W 14 mph
- Game attendance: 0
- TV announcers (FS2): Kevin Fitzgerald (play-by-play), Evan Moore (analyst)

Game information

First quarter

- (11:02) USU – Jaylen Warren 86-yard run, kick failed (Drive: 1 plays, 86 yards, 0:13; Utah State 6–0)
- (4:46) FRES – Jalen Cropper 9-yard pass from Jake Haener, Cesar Silva kick (Drive: 13 plays, 75 yards, 6:10; Fresno State 7–6)
- (4:43) USU – Savon Scarver 94-yard kick return, Connor Coles kick (Utah State 13–7)

Second quarter

- (12:27) FRES – Jalen Cropper 59-yard pass from Jake Haener, Cesar Silva kick (Drive: 4 plays, 96 yards, 1:27; Fresno State 14–13)
- (5:41) FRES – Josh Kelly 71-yard pass from Jake Haener, Cesar Silva kick (Drive: 4 plays, 85 yards, 1:20; Fresno State 21–13)
- (1:59) USU – Connor Coles 38-yard field goal (Drive: 8 plays, 44 yards, 3:35; Fresno State 21–16)
- (0:34) FRES – Ronnie Rivers 4-yard run, Cesar Silva kick (Drive: 7 plays, 74 yards, 1:25; Fresno State 28–16)

Third quarter

- No scoring plays

Fourth quarter

- (5:21) FRES – Jalen Cropper 44-yard pass from Jake Haener, Cesar Silva kick (Drive: 7 plays, 72 yards, 3:12; Fresno State 35–16)

Statistics	FRES	USU
First downs	25	12
Plays–yards	75–541	60–343
Rushes–yards	37–119	35–199
Passing yards	422	144
Passing: comp–att–int	29–38–1	9–24–0
Time of possession	33:49	26:11

Team	Category	Player	Statistics
Fresno State	Passing	Jake Haener	29/38, 422 yards, 4 TD, INT
Fresno State	Rushing	Ronnie Rivers	25 carries 132 yards, TD
Fresno State	Receiving	Jalen Cropper	10 receptions, 202 yards, 3 TD
Utah State	Passing	Jason Shelley	9/24, 144 yards
Utah State	Rushing	Jaylen Warren	9 carries, 136 yards, TD
Utah State	Receiving	Deven Thompkins	3 receptions, 92 yards

=== Nevada ===
Game Five – Fresno State Bulldogs (3–1) at Nevada Wolfpack (5–1)

Quarter	1	2	3	4	Total
Bulldogs	7	13	0	6	26
Wolf Pack	17	7	0	13	37

at Mackay Stadium • Reno, Nevada

- Date: Saturday, December 5, 2020
- Game time: 6:00 p.m. PST
- Game weather: Cloudy • Temperature: 44 °F (7 °C) • Wind: WNW 4 mph
- Game attendance: 50
- TV announcers (FS2): Anthony LaPanta (play-by-play), Ron Johnson (analyst)

Game information

First quarter

- (11:34) NEV – Brandon Talton 49-yard field goal (Drive: 7 plays, 38 yards, 3:26; Nevada 3–0)
- (8:05) FRES – Josh Kelly 9-yard run, Mac Delena kick (Drive: 8 plays, 77 yards, 3:23; Fresno State 7–3)
- (5:12) NEV – Cole Turner 5-yard pass from Carson Strong, Brandon Talton kick (Drive: 4 plays, 40 yards, 1:00; Nevada 10–7)
- (3:30) NEV – Cole Turner 2-yard pass from Carson Strong, Brandon Talton kick (Drive: 3 plays, 21 yards, 1:19; Nevada 17–7)

Second quarter

- (12:03) FRES – Jake Haener 3-yard run, Mac Delena kick (Drive: 16 plays, 75 yards, 6:27; Nevada 17–14)
- (9:14) NEV – Tory Horton 17-yard pass from Carson Strong, Brandon Talton kick (Drive: 6 plays, 59 yards, 2:43; Nevada 24–14)
- (1:32) FRES – Keric Wheatfall 19-yard pass from Jake Haener, kick missed (Drive: 4 plays, 58 yards, 1:00; Nevada 24–20)

Third quarter

- No scoring plays

Fourth quarter

- (13:42) NEV – Tory Horton 85-yard pass from Carson Strong, kick missed (Drive: 3 plays, 85 yards, 0:53; Nevada 30–20)
- (5:32) NEV – Tory Horton 32-yard pass from Carson Strong, Brandon Talton kick (Drive: 5 plays, 65 yards, 2:40; Nevada 37–20)
- (1:39) FRES – Zane Pope 21-yard pass from Jake Haener, kick missed (Drive: 12 plays, 75 yards, 3:53; Nevada 37–26)

Statistics	FRES	NEV
First downs	30	14
Plays–yards	105–599	62–416
Rushes–yards	40–114	22–62
Passing yards	485	354
Passing: comp–att–int	41–65–0	23–39–2
Time of possession	35:01	24:59

Team	Category	Player	Statistics
Fresno State	Passing	Jake Haener	41/65, 485 yards, 2 TD
Fresno State	Rushing	Ronnie Rivers	14 carries, 69 yards
Fresno State	Receiving	Keric Wheatfall	6 receptions, 113 yards, TD
Nevada	Passing	Carson Strong	23/39 354 yards, 5 TD, 2 INT
Nevada	Rushing	Toa Taua	11 carries, 39 yards
Nevada	Receiving	Tory Horton	5 receptions, 148 yards, 3 TD

=== New Mexico ===
Game Six – Fresno State Bulldogs (3–2) at New Mexico Lobos (1–5)

Quarter	1	2	3	4	Total
Bulldogs	7	17	7	8	39
Lobos	7	14	7	21	49

at Sam Boyd Stadium • Whitney, Nevada

- Date: Saturday, December 12, 2020
- Game time: 7:30 p.m. PST
- Game weather: Clear • Temperature: 50 °F (10 °C) • Wind: N 7 mph
- Game attendance: 250
- TV announcers (FS1): Guy Haberman (play-by-play), Charles Arbuckle (analyst)

Game information

First quarter

- (11:28) FRES – Jalen Cropper 10-yard pass from Jake Haener, Asa Fuller kick (Drive: 6 plays, 44 yards, 1:46; Fresno State 7–0)
- (6:34) UNM – Isaiah Chavez 3-yard run, Donovan Murphree kick (Drive: 9 plays, 75 yards, 4:54; Tied 7–7)

Second quarter

- (14:54) FRES – Zane Pope 16-yard pass from Jake Haener, Asa Fuller kick (Drive: 6 plays, 50 yards, 2:06; Fresno State 14–7)
- (11:54) UNM – Nathaniel Jones 3-yard run, Donovan Murphree kick (Drive: 6 plays, 75 yards, 3:00; Tied 14–14)
- (10:27) FRES – Asa Fuller 39-yard field goal (Drive: 5 plays, 56 yards, 1:22; Fresno State 17–14)
- (8:47) FRES – Jordan Mims 84-yard run, Asa Fuller kick (Drive: 1 play, 84 yards, 0:15; Fresno State 24–14)
- (8:47) UNM – Bobby Cole 74-yard run, Donovan Murphree kick (Drive: 7 plays, 71 yards, 3:20; Fresno State 24–21)

Third quarter

- (6:53) FRES – Jake Haener 3-yard run, Asa Fuller kick (Drive: 16 plays, 70 yards, 7:59; Fresno State 31–21)
- (4:49) UNM – Conner Kinslow 49-yard pass from Isaiah Chavez, Donovan Murphree kick (Drive: 5 plays, 77 yards, 1:58; Fresno State 31–28)

Fourth quarter

- (10:20) UNM – Nathaniel Jones 10-yard run, Donovan Murphree kick (Drive: 14 plays, 85 yards, 7:33; New Mexico 35–31)
- (7:26) UNM – Bobby Cole 35-yard run, Donovan Murphree kick (Drive: 1 play, 35 yards, 0:07; New Mexico 42–31)
- (2:33) UNM – Bobby Cole 9-yard run, Donovan Murphree kick (Drive: 5 plays, 70 yards, 2:45; New Mexico 49–31)
- (1:08) FRES – Mac Delena 24-yard pass from Jake Haener, Jake Haener–Zane Pope 2-pont pass kick (Drive: 8 plays, 74 yards, 1:18; New Mexico 49–39)

Statistics	FRES	UNM
First downs	23	24
Plays–yards	67–408	66–495
Rushes–yards	23–58	48–299
Passing yards	350	196
Passing: comp–att–int	26–43–1	14–18–0
Time of possession	28:27	31:33

Team	Category	Player	Statistics
Fresno State	Passing	Jake Haener	26/43, 350 yards, 3 TD, INT
Fresno State	Rushing	Jordan Mims	3 carries, 84 yards, TD
Fresno State	Receiving	Jalen Cropper	12 receptions, 134 yards, TD
New Mexico	Passing	Isaiah Chavez	14/18, 196 yards, TD
New Mexico	Rushing	Bobby Cole	18 carries, 138 yards, 3 TD
New Mexico	Receiving	Marcus Williams	3 receptions, 55 yards
