= 2020 Mountain West Conference Football Championship Game =

Postseason American college football game

- Conference Championship
Boise State Broncos	San Jose State Spartans
(5–1)	(6–0)
20	34
Head coach: Bryan Harsin	Head coach: Brent Brennan
	AP / Coaches / CFP; 25 / 25 / 24
	1	2	3	4	Total
Boise State	3	3	7	7	20
San Jose State	7	12	0	15	34
- Date: December 19, 2020
- Season: 2020
- Stadium: Sam Boyd Stadium
- Location: Whitney, NV
- MVP: Nick Starkel (offensive) and Cade Hall (defensive), San Jose State
- Favorite: Boise State by 6.5
- Referee: Scott Campbell
- Attendance: 0

United States TV coverage
- Network: Fox
- Announcers: Tim Brando (play-by-play) and Petros Papadakis (analyst)

2020 Mountain West Conference football standings
	Conf.			Overall
Team	W		L	W		L
No. 24 San Jose State y$	6	–	0	7	–	1
Boise State y	5	–	0	5	–	2
Nevada	6	–	2	7	–	2
San Diego State	4	–	2	4	–	4
Hawaii	4	–	4	5	–	4
Fresno State	3	–	3	3	–	3
Air Force	2	–	2	3	–	3
Wyoming	2	–	4	2	–	4
New Mexico	2	–	5	2	–	5
Colorado State	1	–	3	1	–	3
Utah State	1	–	5	1	–	5
UNLV	0	–	6	0	–	6
Championship: San Jose State 34, Boise State 20
$ – Conference champion; y – Championship game participant; Note: Due to COVID-19, the Mountain West suspended the season, but later decided to begin play on October 24.; Rankings from AP Poll

The 2020 Mountain West Conference Championship Game was a college football game played on Saturday, December 19, 2020, at Sam Boyd Stadium in Whitney, Nevada, to determine the 2020 champion of the Mountain West Conference (MWC). The game featured the regular-season champions San Jose State and regular-season runners-up Boise State, and was the conference's eighth championship game.

Due to the COVID-19 pandemic, the game was played behind closed doors without fans. Because San Jose State could not host the game due to COVID restrictions, the game was instead hosted in Nevada.

== Teams ==
=== Boise State ===
Boise State entered the championship game with a 5–1 record (5–0 in conference play). Their only loss of the season was to BYU, then ranked ninth in the AP Poll, in early November.

=== San Jose State ===
San Jose State entered the championship game with a 6–0 record, all in games played against conference opponents. Their closest game of the season was a 10-point win over Nevada on December 11. This was San Jose State's first appearance in a Mountain West Conference Championship Game.

== Game summary ==
2020 Mountain West Conference Football Championship Game

Quarter	1	2	3	4	Total
Boise State	3	3	7	7	20
No. 24 San Jose State	7	12	0	15	34

at Sam Boyd Stadium • Whitney, Nevada

- Date: Saturday, December 19, 2020
- Game time: 4:40 p.m. EST (1:40 p.m. PST)
- Game weather: Sunny • Temperature: 56 °F (13 °C) • Wind: NE 1 mph
- Referee: Scott Campbell
- TV announcers (Fox): Tim Brando (play-by-play) and Petros Papadakis (analyst)

Game information

First quarter

- (8:36) SJSU – Tre Walker 55 yard pass from Nick Starkel, Matt Mercurio kick (Drive: 3 plays, 71 yards, 1:48; San Jose State 7–0)
- (3:31) BSU – Jonah Dalmas 51 yard field goal (Drive: 11 plays, 44 yards, 5:05; San Jose State 7–3)

Second quarter

- (14:46) SJSU – Matt Mercurio 24 yard field goal (Drive: 13 plays, 68 yards, 3:45; San Jose State 10–3)
- (6:40) SJSU – Matt Mercurio 36 yard field goal (Drive: 6 plays, 39 yards, 1:56; San Jose State 13–3)
- (2:31) SJSU – Matt Mercurio 26 yard field goal (Drive: 8 plays, 61 yards, 3:27; San Jose State 16–3)
- (0:50) SJSU – Matt Mercurio 32 yard field goal (Drive: 6 plays, 36 yards, 1:05; San Jose State 19–3)
- (0:01) BSU – Jonah Dalmas 50 yard field goal (Drive: 5 plays, 39 yards, 0:50; San Jose State 19–6)

Third quarter

- (2:48) BSU – Avery Williams 69 yard punt return, Jonah Dalmas kick (San Jose State 19–13)

Fourth quarter

- (14:17) SJSU – Isaiah Hamilton 30 yard pass from Nick Starkel, 2-point pass good (Drive: 9 plays, 75 yards, 3:31; San Jose State 27–13)
- (10:51) BSU – Hank Bachmeier 2 yard rush, Jonah Dalmas kick (Drive: 7 plays, 63 yards, 3:26; San Jose State 27–20)
- (3:48) SJSU – Derrick Deese Jr. 1 yard pass from Nick Starkel, Matt Mercurio kick (Drive: 7 plays, 42 yards, 4:30; San Jose State 34–20)

=== Statistics ===
Statistics	BSU	SJSU
First downs	14	26
Plays–yards	66–224	77–498
Rushes–yards	25–3	25–45
Passing yards	221	453
Passing: comp–att–int	20–40–0	32–52–0
Turnovers		
Time of possession	25:27	34:32

Team	Category	Player	Statistics
Boise State	Passing	Hank Bachmeier	20/40, 221 yards
Boise State	Rushing	Andrew Van Buren	11 carries, 26 yards
Boise State	Receiving	Khalil Shakir	6 receptions, 85 yards
San Jose State	Passing	Nick Starkel	32/52, 453 yards, 3 TD
San Jose State	Rushing	Kairee Robinson	12 carries, 39 yards
San Jose State	Receiving	Tre Walker	7 receptions, 137 yards, 1 TD

== Aftermath ==
It was later revealed that this game would be the last football game ever held at Sam Boyd Stadium, as it was the last scheduled event for the stadium. The stadium was permanently closed officially in 2022.

== See also ==
- List of Mountain West Conference football champions
