= 2020 San Diego State Aztecs football team =

American college football season

2020 San Diego State Aztecs football
- Conference: Mountain West Conference
- Record: 4–4 (4–2 MW)
- Head coach: Brady Hoke (3rd season)
- Offensive coordinator: Jeff Hecklinski (1st season)
- Offensive scheme: Multiple
- Defensive coordinator: Kurt Mattix (1st season)
- Base defense: 4–2–5
- Home stadium: Dignity Health Sports Park

2020 Mountain West Conference football standings
	Conf.			Overall
Team	W		L	W		L
No. 24 San Jose State y$	6	–	0	7	–	1
Boise State y	5	–	0	5	–	2
Nevada	6	–	2	7	–	2
San Diego State	4	–	2	4	–	4
Hawaii	4	–	4	5	–	4
Fresno State	3	–	3	3	–	3
Air Force	2	–	2	3	–	3
Wyoming	2	–	4	2	–	4
New Mexico	2	–	5	2	–	5
Colorado State	1	–	3	1	–	3
Utah State	1	–	5	1	–	5
UNLV	0	–	6	0	–	6
Championship: San Jose State 34, Boise State 20
$ – Conference champion; y – Championship game participant; Note: Due to COVID-19, the Mountain West suspended the season, but later decided to begin play on October 24.; Rankings from AP Poll

The 2020 San Diego State Aztecs football team represented San Diego State University in the 2020 NCAA Division I FBS football season. The Aztecs were led by head coach Brady Hoke, in the first season of his second stint, and played their home games at Dignity Health Sports Park in Carson, California, as a member of the Mountain West Conference.

On August 10, 2020, the Mountain West Conference suspended all fall sports competitions due to the COVID-19 pandemic. However, the conference later reversed course and announced plans to resume play on October 24.

Dignity Health Sports Park, also home to LA Galaxy in Major League Soccer and formerly the Los Angeles Wildcats of the XFL, as well as a former home stadium of the NFL's Los Angeles Chargers (which once coincidentally represented San Diego), served as the team's temporary home. The program's former home venue, SDCCU Stadium, was demolished and replaced by Aztec Stadium. This was originally announced when the Mountain West planned to postpone its season.

After finishing their season with a 4–4 record (4–2 in conference games), Hoke announced on December 16 that the program was removing itself from consideration for a bowl game.

== Schedule ==
=== Original ===
Date	Time	Opponent	Site	TV	Result	Attendance
September 5		Sacramento State*	SDCCU Stadium; San Diego, CA		No contest	
September 12		at Toledo*	Glass Bowl; Toledo, OH		No contest	
September 19		UCLA*	SDCCU Stadium; San Diego, CA		Rescheduled for 2023	
September 26		at Nevada	Mackay Stadium; Reno, NV		Rescheduled	
October 3		UNLV	SDCCU Stadium; San Diego, CA		Rescheduled	
October 10		at Utah State	Maverik Stadium; Logan, UT		Rescheduled	
October 17		at Wyoming	War Memorial Stadium; Laramie, WY		No contest	
October 24		San Jose State	SDCCU Stadium; San Diego, CA		Rescheduled	
November 7		Colorado State	SDCCU Stadium; San Diego, CA		Rescheduled	
November 14		at BYU*	LaVell Edwards Stadium; Provo, UT		Rescheduled	
November 21		at Fresno State	Bulldog Stadium; Fresno, CA (rivalry)		Rescheduled	
November 28		Hawaii	SDCCU Stadium; San Diego, CA		Rescheduled	
*Non-conference game; Rankings from AP Poll and CFP Rankings after November 3 released prior to game; All times are in Pacific time

=== Revised ===
Following cancellation of the Fresno State game scheduled for November 27, a replacement game against Colorado was scheduled for November 28; Colorado had been scheduled to play USC, which was also canceled.

Date	Time	Opponent	Site	TV	Result	Attendance
October 24	7:30 p.m.	UNLV	Dignity Health Sports Park; Carson, CA	CBSSN	W 34–6	0
October 31	7:00 p.m.	at Utah State	Maverik Stadium; Logan, UT	CBSSN	W 38–7	5,116
November 6	6:00 p.m.	San Jose State	Dignity Health Sports Park; Carson, CA	CBSSN	L 17–28	0
November 14	1:00 p.m.	Hawaii^{†}	Dignity Health Sports Park; Carson, CA	SPEC HI	W 34–10	0
November 21	12:30 p.m.	at Nevada	Mackay Stadium; Reno, NV	CBS	L 21–26	50
November 27	6:00 p.m.	at Fresno State	Bulldog Stadium; Fresno, CA (rivalry)	FS1	No contest	
November 28	2:00 p.m.	at Colorado*	Folsom Field; Boulder, CO	P12N	L 10–20	0
December 5	4:00 p.m.	Colorado State	Dignity Health Sports Park; Carson, CA	CBSSN	W 29–17	0
December 12	7:00 p.m.	at No. 18 BYU*	LaVell Edwards Stadium; Provo, UT	ESPN2	L 14–28	0
*Non-conference game; ^{†}Homecoming; Rankings from AP Poll and CFP Rankings after November 24 released prior to game; All times are in Pacific time

== Players drafted into the NFL ==
Round	Pick	Player	Position	NFL Club
4	108	Darren Hall	CB	Atlanta Falcons
