= Danny Gonzales =

American football player and coach (born 1976)

Current position
- Title: Defensive coordinator
- Team: Arizona
- Conference: Big 12

Biographical details
- Born: January 13, 1976 (age 50); Albuquerque, New Mexico, U.S.

Playing career
- 1994–1998: New Mexico
- Positions: Punter, safety

Coaching career (HC unless noted)
- 1999–2002: New Mexico (GA)
- 2006–2008: New Mexico (S/ST)
- 2011–2016: San Diego State (S)
- 2017: San Diego State (DC/S)
- 2018: Arizona State (DC)
- 2019: Arizona State (AHC/DC)
- 2020–2023: New Mexico
- 2024: Arizona (LB/ST)
- 2025–present: Arizona (DC)

Administrative career (AD unless noted)
- 2003–2005: New Mexico (video coordinator)

Head coaching record
- Overall: 11–32

Daniel Ray Gonzales (born January 13, 1976) is an American football coach and former player. He is the defensive coordinator at the University of Arizona, a position he has held since 2024. He previously was the head football coach at the University of New Mexico from 2020 to 2023. Prior to 2018, Gonzales had spent his college coaching career on Rocky Long's staffs at the University of New Mexico and San Diego State University.

== Playing career ==
Gonzales attended University of New Mexico, where he was a three-year letterman for the New Mexico Lobos at punter and safety. As a senior, he won the Chuck Cumming Memorial award for morale and spirit, and the Lobo Club Award for unselfish devotion to the team.

== Coaching career ==
Following his playing career, Gonzales joined the coaching staff at the New Mexico as a graduate assistant from 1999 to 2002. He served as the team's video coordinator from 2003 to 2005. He was then promoted to a full-time assistant, coaching the team's safeties, kickers, punters and long snappers from 2006 to 2008.

In 2011, Gonzales joined Rocky Long's staff at San Diego State University. He coached the safeties for six seasons, before being promoted to defensive coordinator prior to the 2017 season. He continued to coach the safeties.

In 2018, Gonzales was hired as a part of Herm Edwards' first staff at Arizona State University to serve as the defensive coordinator.

On December 17, 2019, Gonzales was hired as the Lobo's new head coach, replacing Bob Davie.

On November 25, 2023, Gonzales was relieved from his position at the University of New Mexico after serving as head coach for four years.

On January 25, 2024, Gonzales was hired to join Brent Brennan and the University of Arizona as the special teams coordinator and linebackers coach.

== Head coaching record ==
Year	Team	Overall	Conference	Standing	Bowl/playoffs
New Mexico Lobos (Mountain West Conference) (2020–2023)
2020	New Mexico	2–5	2–5	T–7th	
2021	New Mexico	3–9	1–7	6th (Mountain)	
2022	New Mexico	2–10	0–8	6th (Mountain)	
2023	New Mexico	4–8	2–6	T–10th	
New Mexico:		11–32	5–26		
Total:		11–32			

== Personal life ==
Gonzales, an Albuquerque, New Mexico native, is a 1998 graduate of the University of New Mexico where he earned his bachelor's degree in business administration and general management, and his master's degree in physical education and recreation. He and his wife, Sandra, have four children: Cole, Jake, Chloe and Abby.
