= 2020 UNLV Rebels football team =

American college football season

2020 UNLV Rebels football
- Conference: Mountain West Conference
- Record: 0–6 (0–6 MW)
- Head coach: Marcus Arroyo (1st season)
- Offensive coordinator: Glenn Thomas (1st season)
- Offensive scheme: Multiple
- Defensive coordinator: Peter Hansen (1st season)
- Base defense: 4–3
- Home stadium: Allegiant Stadium

2020 Mountain West Conference football standings
	Conf.			Overall
Team	W		L	W		L
No. 24 San Jose State y$	6	–	0	7	–	1
Boise State y	5	–	0	5	–	2
Nevada	6	–	2	7	–	2
San Diego State	4	–	2	4	–	4
Hawaii	4	–	4	5	–	4
Fresno State	3	–	3	3	–	3
Air Force	2	–	2	3	–	3
Wyoming	2	–	4	2	–	4
New Mexico	2	–	5	2	–	5
Colorado State	1	–	3	1	–	3
Utah State	1	–	5	1	–	5
UNLV	0	–	6	0	–	6
Championship: San Jose State 34, Boise State 20
$ – Conference champion; y – Championship game participant; Note: Due to COVID-19, the Mountain West suspended the season, but later decided to begin play on October 24.; Rankings from AP Poll

The 2020 UNLV Rebels football team represented the University of Nevada, Las Vegas (UNLV) as a member of the Mountain West Conference (MW) during the 2020 NCAA Division I FBS football season. Led by first-year head coach Marcus Arroyo, the Rebels compiled an overall record of 0–6 record with an identical mark in conference play, placing last out of 12 teams in the MW. The team played home games at the newly-opened Allegiant Stadium in Paradise, Nevada.

On August 10, 2020, the Mountain West Conference suspended all fall sports competitions due to the COVID-19 pandemic. On September 24, 2020, the Mountain West Conference resumed all fall sports competitions. Due to scheduling issues with the Las Vegas Raiders at Allegiant Stadium, UNLV moved its September 5, 2020 home game to Sam Boyd Stadium, but the game was later canceled.

== Schedule ==
UNLV had games scheduled against Arizona State, California, Iowa State and Louisiana Tech that were canceled due to the COVID-19 pandemic.

On November 18, the Mountain West canceled UNLV's scheduled game on November 21 against Colorado State due to contact tracing of COVID-19 cases within the UNLV program. On December 2, the conference canceled the Rebels' scheduled game on December 4 against Boise State due to COVID-19 protocols.

Date	Time	Opponent	Site	TV	Result	Attendance
October 24	7:30 p.m.	at San Diego State	Dignity Health Sports Park; Carson, CA	CBSSN	L 6–34	0
October 31	7:30 p.m.	Nevada	Allegiant Stadium; Paradise, NV (Fremont Cannon)	FS1	L 19–37	2,000
November 7	12:30 p.m.	Fresno State	Allegiant Stadium; Paradise, NV	CBSSN	L 27–40	2,000
November 14	7:30 p.m.	at San Jose State	CEFCU Stadium; San Jose, CA	FS2	L 17–34	0
November 21	2:30 p.m.	at Colorado State	Canvas Stadium; Fort Collins, CO	FS2	Cancelled	
November 27	1:00 p.m.	Wyoming	Allegiant Stadium; Paradise, NV	FS1	L 14–45	0
December 4	6:30 p.m.	Boise State	Allegiant Stadium; Paradise, NV	CBSSN	Cancelled	
December 12	8:00 p.m.	at Hawaii	Aloha Stadium; Halawa, HI	SPEC HI	L 21–38	0
All times are in Pacific time

== Preseason ==
=== Mountain West media days ===
The Mountain West media days were originally scheduled to take place from July 27–29, 2020 virtually, but were canceled.

==== Media poll ====
The preseason poll was released on July 21, 2020. The Rebels were predicted to finish in sixth place in the MW West Division. The divisions were later suspended for the 2020 season.

== Game summaries ==
=== At San Diego State ===
	1	2	3	4	Total
Rebels	0	0	6	0	6
Aztecs	7	20	0	7	34

=== Nevada ===
	1	2	3	4	Total
Wolf Pack	10	14	3	10	37
Rebels	3	9	7	0	19

=== Fresno State ===
	1	2	3	4	Total
Bulldogs	6	14	7	13	40
Rebels	7	10	10	0	27

=== At San Jose State ===
	1	2	3	4	Total
Rebels	3	7	7	0	17
Spartans	10	14	7	3	34

=== Wyoming ===
	1	2	3	4	Total
Cowboys	10	7	21	7	45
Rebels	0	7	0	7	14

=== At Hawaii ===
	1	2	3	4	Total
Rebels	0	7	14	0	21
Rainbow Warriors	7	14	14	3	38
