= Derrick Deese Jr. =

American football player (born 1998)

Profile
- Position: Tight end

Personal information
- Born: August 19, 1998 (age 28); La Palma, California, U.S.
- Listed height: 6 ft 4 in (1.93 m)
- Listed weight: 235 lb (107 kg)

Career information
- High school: John F. Kennedy (La Palma)
- College: Golden West (2016–2018); San Jose State (2018–2021)
- NFL draft: 2022: undrafted

Career history
- Detroit Lions (2022–2023)*; Houston Roughnecks (2024)*; Michigan Panthers (2024)
- * Offseason or practice squad member only
- Stats at Pro Football Reference

Derrick Deese Jr. (born August 19, 1998) is an American former professional football tight end. He played college football at San Jose State. He went undrafted in the 2022 NFL draft and was subsequently picked up by the Detroit Lions.

== Early life ==
Deese was born on August 19, 1998, in La Palma, California. He played high school football at John F. Kennedy High School. He was a two-star recruit. He recorded 431 receiving yards on 25 receptions as a senior.

== College career ==
=== Golden West College ===
Deese's first touchdown in the college ranks came in the first week of the season against Glendale. He registered a 36-yard touchdown reception, his one and only reception of the game in the 33–0 win. That would be Deese's only touchdown reception of the year as he finished with 155 receiving yards in six games.

In his sophomore year in 2017, Deese recorded his first touchdown reception of the season against Cerritos. He brought in four receptions for 31 yards and one touchdown in the 23–36 loss. On September 30, he recorded his first 100-yard receiving game of his career against Long Beach. He put up 111 yards on five receptions and one touchdown in the 24–52 loss.

== Professional career ==
Pre-draft measurables
Height	Weight	Arm length	Hand span	40-yard dash	10-yard split	20-yard split	Vertical jump	Broad jump	Bench press
6 ft 3 1/4 in (1.91 m)	244 lb (111 kg)	33 5/8 in (0.85 m)	10 1/4 in (0.26 m)	4.93 s	1.65 s	2.84 s	31.0 in (0.79 m)	10 ft 0 in (3.05 m)	18 reps
All values from Pro Day

Deese went undrafted in the 2022 NFL draft. He was signed by the Detroit Lions on April 30. However he was released by the Lions during their final offseason roster cutdown. He would remain a free agent until he was scooped up by the Lions again on January 11, 2023. He signed a futures contract with the team. He was placed on the reserve/non-football injury list on July 20, 2023. Deese was waived by the Detroit Lions on August 2, 2023.

On January 19, 2024, Deese signed with the Houston Roughnecks of the United Football League (UFL).

On February 15, 2024, Deese signed with the Michigan Panthers.

== Personal life ==
Deese is the son of former Super Bowl XXIX champion offensive lineman Derrick Deese.
