= Stacy Collins =

American football player and coach (born 1975)

Current position
- Title: Assistant head coach, special teams coordinator & linebackers coach
- Team: Boise State
- Conference: MW

Biographical details
- Born: September 10, 1975 (age 51); Sutherlin, Oregon, U.S.

Playing career
- 1993–1997: Western Oregon
- Position: Linebacker

Coaching career (HC unless noted)
- 1998–2001: Western Oregon (STC/LB)
- 1999–2001: Vienna Vikings (DC)
- 2002: South Dakota Mines (DC/STC)
- 2003–2004: Western Washington (STC/LB)
- 2005–2006: Idaho State (LB)
- 2007: Southern Oregon (DC)
- 2008–2009: Central Washington (STC/DL)
- 2010: Central Washington (STC/LB)
- 2011: Portland State (STC)
- 2012–2015: South Dakota Mines
- 2016: Utah State (STC)
- 2017–2018: Utah State (ILB)
- 2019: Utah State (STC/RB)
- 2020: Utah State (co-DC/DB)
- 2021: Boise State (STC/EDGE)
- 2022–2023: Penn State (STC/OLB)
- 2024–present: Boise State (AHC/STC/LB)

Head coaching record
- Overall: 16–27

Stacy Collins (born September 10, 1975) is an American football coach and former player. He is currently the assistant head coach, special teams coordinator and linebackers coach Boise State University. Collins served as the head football coach at the South Dakota School of Mines and Technology from 2012 through 2015 and Special Teams Cooedinator at Penn State University.

== Playing career ==
Collins played linebacker for Western Oregon from 1993 through 1997, while completing his degree in physical education.

== Coaching career ==
=== Western Oregon ===
Following his playing career, Collins joined the coaching staff at Western Oregon as the special teams coordinator and linebackers coach from 1998 to 2001, while also completing his master's degree in education.

=== Vienna Vikings ===
Collins also served as the defensive coordinator for the Vienna Vikings of the Austrian Football League from 1999 to 2001. He also served a stint as the Interim Head Coach.

=== South Dakota Mines (first stop) ===
For the 2002 season, Collins was the defensive coordinator and the special teams coordinator at South Dakota Mines.

=== Western Washington ===
The following season, Collins returned to the West Coast. He spent two seasons (2003–2004) coaching the linebackers and coordinating the special teams at Western Washington. While here, Collins helped develop future National Football League (NFL) punter Michael Koenen.

=== Idaho State ===
Collins moved on to Idaho State for the 2005 and 2006 football seasons, coaching the linebackers for the Bengals.

=== Southern Oregon ===
Collins was the defensive coordinator at Southern Oregon. He also served as the recruiting coordinator.

=== Central Washington ===
Collins spent 2008 through 2010 at Central Washington. He spent all three years as the special teams coordinator, while coaching the defensive line in 2008 and 2009, and the linebackers in 2010.

=== Portland State ===
For the 2011 season, Collins served as the special teams coordinator for the Portland State Vikings football team.

=== South Dakota Mines (second stop) ===
In 2012, Collins returned to South Dakota Mines for his first head coaching opportunity. In his four seasons at the helm, Collins led the Hardrockers to two winning seasons, making the total winning seasons in 30 seasons three. Although also served as the special teams coordinator, Collins’ teams saw historic offensive success, breaking numerous offensive records with a wide-open, pass-heavy, explosive scheme. At the time of Collins’ departure, He was sixth on the all-time wins list at South Dakota Mines.

=== Utah State ===
Following his success at South Dakota Mines, Collins Joined Matt Wells’ Staff at Utah State as the special teams coordinator for the 2016 season. In 2017 and 2018, Collins transitioned to coaching the inside linebackers. Following Wells’ departure for Texas Tech prior to the 2019, Collins was retained by returning head coach Gary Andersen. He moved to the offensive side of the ball coaching the running backs, as well as taking over the special teams duties again.

On January 15, 2020, it was announced that Collins would be promoted to co-coordinate the defense, and would switch positional responsibilities from running backs to defensive backs.

=== Boise State ===
In January 2021, Collins was hired by Andy Avalos at Boise State to coordinate the special teams and coach the "edge" outside linebacker position on defense. After spending two seasons as an assistant at Penn State, he returned to Boise State to serve under head coach Spencer Danielson in January 2024.

== Personal life ==
Collins and his wife, Mandi, have four daughters, Kayla, Mackenzie, Kylee and Mackenna.

== Head coaching record ==
Year	Team	Overall	Conference	Standing	Bowl/playoffs
South Dakota Mines Hardrockers (NCAA Division II independent) (2012–2013)
2012	South Dakota Mines	2–9			
2013	South Dakota Mines	6–4			
South Dakota Mines Hardrockers (Great Northwest Athletic Conference) (2014–2015)
2014	South Dakota Mines	2–9	1–5	6th	
2015	South Dakota Mines	6–5	2–4	5th	
South Dakota Mines:		16–27	3–9		
Total:		16–27			
