= Nick Starkel =

American football player & coach (born 1998)

Profile
- Position: Quarterback

Personal information
- Born: February 24, 1998 (age 28); Pittsburgh, Pennsylvania, U.S.
- Listed height: 6 ft 3 in (1.91 m)
- Listed weight: 214 lb (97 kg)

Career information
- High school: Liberty Christian School (Argyle, Texas)
- College: Texas A&M (2016–2018); Arkansas (2019); San Jose State (2020–2021)
- NFL draft: 2022: undrafted

Awards and highlights
- Second-team All-Mountain West (2020)

Nicholas Starkel (born February 24, 1998) is an American former college football quarterback who played for the Texas A&M Aggies, Arkansas Razorbacks, and San Jose State Spartans.

== Early life ==
Starkel was born in Pittsburgh to Wendy and Murray Starkel. Starkel lived in eight different cities prior to graduating from high school, as his father Murray was a longtime United States Army officer who worked with the Army's Corps of Engineers.

Starkel attended Liberty Christian School in Argyle, Texas, where he threw for 4,745 yards and 48 touchdowns in three seasons, 3,091 of which came from his senior season. A three-star recruit, Starkel initially committed to Oklahoma State, but after talking with former USC quarterback Cody Kessler, he de-committed from Oklahoma State and narrowed it to UCLA and Texas A&M, committing to play college football at Texas A&M.

College recruiting
Name	Hometown	School	Height	Weight	Commit date
Nick Starkel; QB	Argyle, Texas	Liberty Christian School	6 ft 3 in (1.91 m)	185 lb (84 kg)	Jan 27, 2016
Nick Starkel; QB	Recruit ratings: Rivals: 247Sports: ESPN:				
Overall recruit ranking:
Note: In many cases, Scout, Rivals, 247Sports, On3, and ESPN may conflict in their listings of height and weight.; In these cases, the average was taken. ESPN grades are on a 100-point scale.; Sources: "2016 Team Ranking". Rivals.com.

== College career ==
=== Texas A&M ===
Starkel entered Texas A&M University redshirting his true freshman season in 2016. As a redshirt freshman in 2017, he won the starting quarterback job, although he suffered a broken leg in the season-opener against UCLA. Starkel returned to play six more games in 2017, including a 499-yard, four touchdown performance against Wake Forest in the Belk Bowl that was a Belk Bowl record.

Under new head coach Jimbo Fisher, Starkel lost the starting job to Kellen Mond in 2018, the latter thriving under Fisher's system, leading to Starkel announcing he would transfer as a graduate student, with immediate eligibility.

=== Arkansas ===
Starkel transferred to Arkansas before the 2019 season. He competed with Ben Hicks for the starting quarterback job, and split time with Hicks in the season opener against Portland State. After replacing Hicks in a 31–17 loss to Ole Miss, Starkel was named the Razorbacks starter for their game against Colorado State, throwing for 305 yards and three touchdowns in a 55–34 win. The following week, he threw five interceptions in a loss to San Jose State. Starkel announced he would transfer from Arkansas after one season, later citing conflict with head coach Chad Morris and offensive coordinator Joe Craddock.

=== San Jose State ===
After Starkel put his name in the transfer portal, former San Jose State player Josh Love reached out to Starkel and informed him the San Jose State coaches were interested in a transfer quarterback and put the two sides in touch. Starkel later announced that he would transfer to San Jose State University in 2020.

At San Jose State, Starkel had a stellar 2020 season, posting career-highs in passing yards, touchdowns, and passer rating, as San Jose State went 7–0 in conference play and won the 2020 Mountain West Conference Championship. Starkel was named the game's most valuable player after throwing for 453 yards and three touchdowns in the game. Starkel was also named to the Mountain West's All-Conference second team.

With the NCAA approving a waiver that allowed college football players to retain their 2020 standing for the 2021 season due to the COVID-19 pandemic, Starkel announced on Twitter that he would return for a sixth season of eligibility.

=== Statistics ===
Year	Team	Games			Passing								Rushing			
Year	Team	GP	GS	Record	Comp	Att	Pct	Yds	Avg	TD	INT	Rtg	Att	Yds	Avg	TD
2016	Texas A&M	Redshirt (redshirt)														
2017	Texas A&M	7	5	2–3	123	205	60.0	1,793	8.7	14	6	150.2	12	−42	−3.5	1
2018	Texas A&M	4	0	0–0	15	22	68.2	169	7.7	1	0	147.7	1	−6	−6.0	0
2019	Arkansas	8	5	1–4	96	179	53.6	1,152	6.4	7	10	109.4	6	−16	−2.7	0
2020	San Jose State	8	8	7–1	163	254	64.2	2,174	8.6	17	7	152.6	13	−40	−3.1	0
2021	San Jose State	7	6	2–4	128	248	51.6	1,645	6.6	9	7	113.7	15	−71	−4.7	1
Career		34	24	12−12	525	908	57.8	6,933	7.6	48	30	132.8	47	−185	−3.9	2

== Post-college career ==
After not being selected in the 2022 NFL draft, Starkel attended the Dallas Cowboys and New York Jets' rookie minicamps but was not signed. He later became the quarterbacks coach, passing game coordinator, and junior varsity head coach at Corona del Mar High School. Starkel also works as a private quarterback tutor.
