= 2019 Wyoming Cowboys football team =

American college football season

2019 Wyoming Cowboys football

Arizona Bowl champion

Arizona Bowl, W 38–17 vs. Georgia State
- Conference: Mountain West Conference
- Mountain Division
- Record: 8–5 (4–4 MW)
- Head coach: Craig Bohl (6th season)
- Offensive coordinator: Brent Vigen (6th season)
- Offensive scheme: Pro-style
- Defensive coordinator: Jake Dickert (1st season)
- Base defense: 4–3
- Home stadium: War Memorial Stadium

Uniform
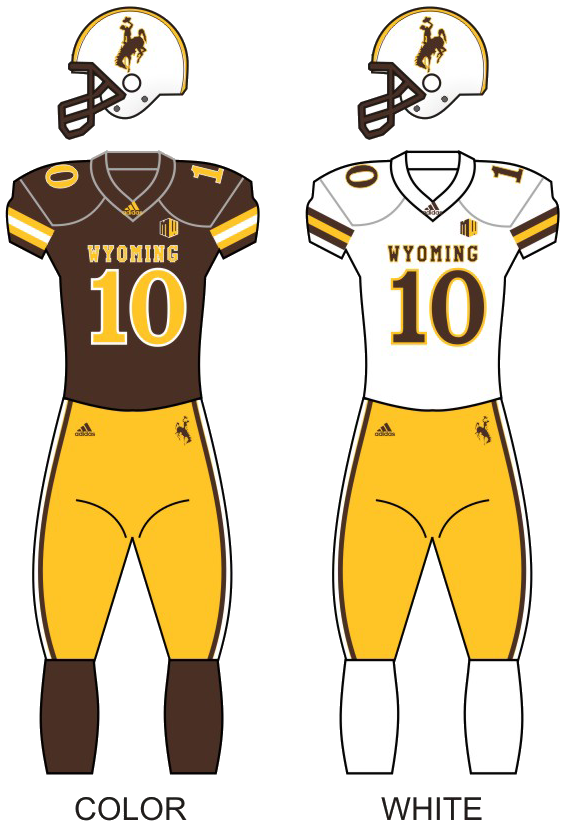

2019 Mountain West Conference football standings
	Conf.			Overall
Team	W		L	W		L
Mountain Division
No. 23 Boise State xy$	8	–	0	12	–	2
No. 22 Air Force	7	–	1	11	–	2
Utah State	6	–	2	7	–	6
Wyoming	4	–	4	8	–	5
Colorado State	3	–	5	4	–	8
New Mexico	0	–	8	2	–	10
West Division
Hawaii xy	5	–	3	10	–	5
San Diego State x	5	–	3	10	–	3
Nevada	4	–	4	7	–	6
San Jose State	2	–	6	5	–	7
UNLV	2	–	6	4	–	8
Fresno State	2	–	6	4	–	8
Championship: Boise State 31, Hawaii 10
$ – Conference champion; x – Division champion/co-champions; y – Championship game participant; Rankings from AP Poll

The 2019 Wyoming Cowboys football team represented the University of Wyoming as a member Mountain West Conference (MW) during the 2019 NCAA Division I FBS football season. Led by sixth-year head coach Craig Bohl, the Cowboys compiled an overall record of 8–5 record with mark 4–4 in conference play, placing fourth in the MW's Mountain Division. Wyoming was invited to the Arizona Bowl, where the Cowboys defeated Georgia State. The team played home games at War Memorial Stadium in Laramie, Wyoming.

== Schedule ==
Date	Time	Opponent	Site	TV	Result	Attendance
August 31	5:30 p.m.	Missouri*	War Memorial Stadium; Laramie, WY	CBSSN	W 37–31	30,037
September 7	5:00 p.m.	at Texas State*	Bobcat Stadium; San Marcos, TX	ESPN+	W 23–14	18,003
September 14	3:00 p.m.	Idaho*	War Memorial Stadium; Laramie, WY	ESPN3	W 21–16	28,814
September 21	1:30 p.m.	at Tulsa*	Skelly Field at H. A. Chapman Stadium; Tulsa, OK	CBSSN	L 21–24	16,246
September 28	6:00 p.m.	UNLV	War Memorial Stadium; Laramie, WY	ESPNU	W 53–17	23,029
October 12	8:30 p.m.	at San Diego State	SDCCU Stadium; San Diego, CA	CBSSN	L 22–26	28,758
October 19	1:00 p.m.	New Mexico^{†}	War Memorial Stadium; Laramie, WY	AT&T RM	W 23–10	22,884
October 26	12:00 p.m.	Nevada	War Memorial Stadium; Laramie, WY	AT&T RM	W 31–3	16,126
November 9	8:15 p.m.	at No. 21 Boise State	Albertsons Stadium; Boise, ID	ESPN	L 17–20 ^{OT}	33,018
November 16	2:00 p.m.	at Utah State	Maverik Stadium; Logan, UT (rivalry)	ESPNU	L 21–26	16,364
November 22	7:30 p.m.	Colorado State	War Memorial Stadium; Laramie, WY (Border War)	ESPN2	W 17–7	21,152
November 30	12:00 pm	at Air Force	Falcon Stadium; Colorado Springs, CO	Stadium on Facebook	L 6–20	21,425
December 31	2:30 p.m.	vs. Georgia State*	Arizona Stadium; Tucson, AZ (Arizona Bowl)	CBSSN	W 38–17	36,892
*Non-conference game; ^{†}Homecoming; Rankings from AP Poll released prior to the game; All times are in Mountain time

== Preseason ==
Wyoming held its annual Brown and Gold Game on April 27. The Gold Team featured the No. 1 offense, while the Brown Team featured the No. 1 Defense. The Gold Team won, 14–9.

=== Award watch lists ===
Listed in the order that they were released

Award	Player	Position	Year
Chuck Bednarik Award	Logan Wilson	LB	SR
Butkus Award	Logan Wilson	LB	SR
Lou Groza Award	Cooper Rothe	PK	SR

=== Mountain West media days ===
Mountain West media days were held on July 23 and 24 at the Cosmopolitan on the Las Vegas Strip.

==== Media poll ====
Wyoming was picked to finish fourth in the Mountain Division in the Mountain West preseason poll.

==== Preseason All-Mountain West ====
- Special Teams Player of the Year: Cooper Rothe, Wyoming

All-Mountain West Specialists
Position	Player	Class	Team
PK	Cooper Rothe	Sr.	Wyoming

== Game summaries ==
=== Missouri ===
	1	2	3	4	Total
Tigers	14	3	0	14	31
Cowboys	0	27	7	3	37

Scoring summary

Quarter	Time	Drive			Team	Scoring information	Score	
Quarter	Time	Plays	Yards	TOP	Team	Scoring information	MIZ	WYO
1	9:04	12	65	4:31	MIZ	Jonathan Nance 3-yard touchdown reception from Kelly Bryant, Tucker McCann kick good	7	0
1	3:19	11	74	4:27	MIZ	Larry Rountree III 2-yard touchdown run, Tucker McCann kick good	14	0
2	9:09	12	53	5:37	WYO	19-yard field goal by Cooper Rothe	14	3
2	7:54	3	5	1:15	WYO	Fumble recovery returned 30 yards for touchdown by C.J. Coldon, Cooper Rothe kick good	14	10
2	6:15	2	61	0:14	WYO	Xazavian Valladay 61-yard touchdown run, Cooper Rothe kick good	14	17
2	2:11	13	70	4:04	MIZ	22-yard field goal by Tucker McCann	17	17
2	1:58	1	75	0:13	WYO	Sean Chambers 75-yard touchdown run, Cooper Rothe kick good	17	24
2	0:00	1	0	0:00	WYO	23-yard field goal by Cooper Rothe	17	27
3	4:21	11	80	5:43	WYO	Trey Smith 1-yard touchdown run, Cooper Rothe kick good	17	34
4	13:29	4	29	1:10	MIZ	Tyler Badie 1-yard touchdown run, Tucker McCann kick good	24	34
4	7:01	9	38	3:24	WYO	20-yard field goal by Cooper Rothe	24	37
4	6:19	3	75	0:42	MIZ	Jonathan Nance 53-yard touchdown reception from Kelly Bryant, Tucker McCann kick good	31	37
"TOP" = time of possession. For other American football terms, see Glossary of American football.							31	37

- Passing leaders: Sean Chambers (WYO): 6–16, 92 YDS; Kelly Bryant (MIZ): 31–48, 423 YDS, 2 TD, 1 INT
- Rushing leaders: Sean Chambers (WYO): 12 CAR, 120 YDS, 1 TD; Tyler Badie (MIZ): 16 CAR, 53 YDS, 1 TD
- Receiving leaders: Raghib Ismail Jr. (WYO): 2 REC, 42 YDS; Albert Okwuegbunam (MIZ): 3 REC, 72 YDS

=== At Texas State ===
	1	2	3	4	Total
Cowboys	0	10	10	3	23
Bobcats	7	7	0	0	14

Scoring summary

Quarter	Time	Drive			Team	Scoring information	Score	
Quarter	Time	Plays	Yards	TOP	Team	Scoring information	WYO	TXST
1	9:57	6	74	1:51	TXST	Caleb Twyford 1-yard touchdown run, Joshua Rowland kick good	0	7
2	12:59	10	50	4:08	WYO	47-yard field goal by Cooper Rothe	3	7
2	11:15	5	75	1:44	TXST	Jah'Marae Sheread 50-yard touchdown reception from Gresch Jensen, Joshua Rowland kick good	3	14
2	2:56	6	46	2:58	WYO	Sean Chambers 7-yard touchdown run, Cooper Rothe kick good	10	14
3	10:44	7	42	2:56	WYO	37-yard field goal by Cooper Rothe	13	14
3	8:36	6	37	2:08	WYO	Interception returned 72 yards for touchdown by Tyler Hall, Cooper Rothe kick good	20	14
4	10:19	18	88	9:12	WYO	19-yard field goal by Cooper Rothe	23	14
"TOP" = time of possession. For other American football terms, see Glossary of American football.							23	14

- Passing leaders: Sean Chambers (WYO): 8–18, 103 YDS, 1 INT; Gresch Jensen (TXST): 33–54, 394 YDS, 1 TD, 2 INT
- Rushing leaders: Trey Smith (WYO): 16 CAR, 54 YDS; Caleb Twyford (TXST): 10 CAR, 60 YDS, 1 TD
- Receiving leaders: Gunner Gentry (WYO): 1 REC, 44 YDS; Hutch White (TXST): 10 REC, 96 YDS

=== Idaho ===
	1	2	3	4	Total
Vandals	3	7	3	3	16
Cowboys	0	14	0	7	21

Scoring summary

Quarter	Time	Drive			Team	Scoring information	Score	
Quarter	Time	Plays	Yards	TOP	Team	Scoring information	IDAHO	WYO
1	5:55	11	62	5:25	IDAHO	26-yard field goal by Cade Coffey	3	0
2	12:00	9	68	4:13	IDAHO	Roshaun Johnson 15-yard touchdown run, Cade Coffey kick good	10	0
2	7:28	9	75	4:32	WYO	Raghib Ismail Jr. 12-yard touchdown run, Cooper Rothe kick good	10	7
2	4:57	2	14	0:44	WYO	Trey Smith 10-yard touchdown run, Cooper Rothe kick good	10	14
3	4:10	14	66	6:44	IDAHO	34-yard field goal by Cade Coffey	13	14
4	10:16	1	80	0:12	WYO	Trey Smith 80-yard touchdown run, Cooper Rothe kick good	13	21
4	7:20	12	68	2:56	IDAHO	24-yard field goal by Cade Coffey	16	21
"TOP" = time of possession. For other American football terms, see Glossary of American football.							16	21

- Passing leaders: Sean Chambers (WYO): 4–12, 50 YDS; Mason Petrino (IDAHO): 15–33, 184 YDS
- Rushing leaders: Trey Smith (WYO): 17 CAR, 152 YDS, 2 TD; Roshaun Johnson (IDAHO): 15 CAR, 69 YDS, 1 TD
- Receiving leaders: Jackson Marcotte (WYO): 1 REC, 23 YDS; Jeff Cotton (IDAHO): 6 REC, 91 YDS

=== At Tulsa ===
	1	2	3	4	Total
Cowboys	7	0	0	14	21
Golden Hurricane	0	14	3	7	24

Scoring summary

Quarter	Time	Drive			Team	Scoring information	Score	
Quarter	Time	Plays	Yards	TOP	Team	Scoring information	WYO	TLSA
1	7:46	9	74	4:43	WYO	Sean Chambers 33-yard touchdown run, Cooper Rothe kick good	7	0
2	2:49	3	56	0:16	TSLA	Keylon Stokes 56-yard touchdown reception from Zach Smith, Jacob Rainey kick good	7	7
2	1:10	5	66	1:13	TLSA	Sam Crawford Jr. 37-yard touchdown reception from Zach Smith, Jacob Rainey kick good	7	14
3	9:26	14	42	4:15	TLSA	29-yard field goal by Jacob Rainey	7	17
4	11:03	6	92	2:10	WYO	Ayden Eberhardt 53-yard touchdown reception from Sean Chambers, Cooper Rothe kick good	14	17
4	5:25	6	50	2:24	WYO	Sean Chambers 15-yard touchdown run, Cooper Rothe kick good	21	17
4	3:26	7	75	1:59	TLSA	Shamari Brooks 19-yard touchdown run, Jacob Rainey kick good	21	24
"TOP" = time of possession. For other American football terms, see Glossary of American football.							21	24

- Passing leaders: Sean Chambers (WYO): 9–25, 193 YDS, 1 TD; Zach Smith (TLSA): 25–50, 354 YDS, 2 TD
- Rushing leaders: Sean Chambers (WYO): 11 CAR, 83 YDS, 2 TD; Shamari Brooks (TLSA): 17 CAR, 67 YDS, 1 TD
- Receiving leaders: Ayden Eberhardt (WYO): 1 REC, 53 YDS, 1 TD; Keenan Johnson (TLSA): 7 REC, 95 YDS

=== UNLV ===
	1	2	3	4	Total
Rebels	10	0	0	7	17
Cowboys	7	26	0	20	53

Scoring summary

Quarter	Time	Drive			Team	Scoring information	Score	
Quarter	Time	Plays	Yards	TOP	Team	Scoring information	UNLV	WYO
1	9:03	9	47	3:59	UNLV	40-yard field goal by Daniel Gutierrez	3	0
1	4:50	8	75	4:13	WYO	Xazavian Valladay 7-yard touchdown run, Cooper Rothe kick good	3	7
1	1:09	7	75	3:41	UNLV	Giovanni Fauolo Sr. 54-yard touchdown reception from Armani Rogers, Daniel Gutierrez kick good	10	7
2	14:18	4	75	1:51	WYO	Sean Chambers 17-yard touchdown run, Cooper Rothe kick no good	10	13
2	10:36	3	65	1:20	WYO	Josh Harshman 56-yard touchdown reception from Sean Chambers, Cooper Rothe kick good	10	20
2	3:53	7	44	3:48	WYO	41-yard field goal by Cooper Rothe	10	23
2	2:08	4	-1	1:00	WYO	21-yard field goal by Cooper Rothe	10	26
2	1:04	4	58	0:45	WYO	Jackson Marcotte 20-yard touchdown reception from Sean Chambers, Cooper Rothe kick good	10	33
4	14:49	6	47	2:30	WYO	Sean Chambers 5-yard touchdown run, Cooper Rothe kick good	10	40
4	10:24	14	75	4:25	UNLV	Kenyon Oblad 1-yard touchdown run, Daniel Gutierrez kick good	17	40
4	9:44	2	45	0:38	WYO	Titus Swen 44-yard touchdown run, Cooper Rothe kick no good	17	46
4	9:26	1	4	0:05	WYO	Xazavian Valladay 4-yard touchdown run, Cooper Rothe kick good	17	53
"TOP" = time of possession. For other American football terms, see Glossary of American football.							17	53

- Passing leaders: Sean Chambers (WYO): 5–12, 124 YDS, 2 TD; Kenyon Oblad (UNLV): 16–31, 176 YDS, 2 INT
- Rushing leaders: Titus Swen (WYO): 14 CAR, 136 YDS, 1 TD; Darran Williams (UNLV): 11 CAR, 30 YDS
- Receiving leaders: Josh Harshman (WYO): 1 REC, 56 YDS, 1 TD; Giovanni Fauolo Sr. (UNLV): 4 REC, 83 YDS, 1 TD

=== At San Diego State ===
	1	2	3	4	Total
Cowboys	0	14	0	8	22
Aztecs	3	3	13	7	26

Scoring summary

Quarter	Time	Drive			Team	Scoring information	Score	
Quarter	Time	Plays	Yards	TOP	Team	Scoring information	WYO	SDSU
1	0:43	7	40	3:22	SDSU	47-yard field goal by Matt Araiza	0	3
2	13:03	6	75	2:40	WYO	Sean Chambers 1-yard touchdown run, Cooper Rothe kick good	7	3
2	5:30	9	54	5:09	WYO	Sean Chambers 1-yard touchdown run, Cooper Rothe kick good	14	3
2	1:11	10	56	4:14	SDSU	32-yard field goal by Matt Araiza	14	6
3	7:48	12	69	5:07	SDSU	Juwan Washington 15-yard touchdown reception from Ryan Agnew, Matt Araiza kick good	14	13
3	1:28	9	63	4:47	SDSU	Juwan Washington 10-yard touchdown run, 2-point pass failed	14	19
4	6:49	10	79	4:55	WYO	Raghib Ismail Jr. 19-yard touchdown reception from Sean Chambers, 2-point run good	22	19
4	2:09	9	76	4:34	SDSU	Daniel Bellinger 12-yard touchdown reception from Ryan Agnew, Matt Araiza kick good	22	26
"TOP" = time of possession. For other American football terms, see Glossary of American football.							22	26

- Passing leaders: Sean Chambers (WYO): 5–14, 109 YDS, 1 TD, 1 INT; Ryan Agnew (SDSU): 21–32, 209 YDS, 2 TD
- Rushing leaders: Xazavian Valladay (WYO): 16 CAR, 73 YDS; Juwan Washington (SDSU): 23 CAR, 84 YDS, 1 TD
- Receiving leaders: Gunner Gentry (WYO): 1 REC, 45 YDS; Jesse Matthews (SDSU): 6 REC, 73 YDS

=== New Mexico ===
	1	2	3	4	Total
Lobos	0	0	0	10	10
Cowboys	7	0	6	10	23

Scoring summary

Quarter	Time	Drive			Team	Scoring information	Score	
Quarter	Time	Plays	Yards	TOP	Team	Scoring information	UNM	WYO
1	0:04	4	36	1:36	WYO	Sean Chambers 1-yard touchdown run, Cooper Rothe kick good	0	7
3	7:31	9	70	4:05	WYO	Xazavian Valladay 3-yard touchdown run, Cooper Rothe kick no good	0	13
4	14:55	7	40	1:24	UNM	25-yard field goal by Andrew Shelley	3	13
4	9:40	10	75	5:15	WYO	Josh Harshman 15-yard touchdown reception from Sean Chambers, Cooper Rothe kick good	3	20
4	6:31	9	75	3:09	UNM	Aaron Molina 21-yard touchdown reception from Tevaka Tuioti, Andrew Shelley kick good	10	20
4	0:58	11	56	5:33	WYO	36-yard field goal by Cooper Rothe	10	23
"TOP" = time of possession. For other American football terms, see Glossary of American football.							10	23

- Passing leaders: Sean Chambers (WYO): 9–15, 86 YDS, 1 TD; Sheriron Jones (UNM): 9–17, 143 YDS
- Rushing leaders: Xazavian Valladay (WYO): 33 Car, 127 YDS, 1 TD; Ahmari Davis (UNM): 14 CAR, 86 YDS
- Receiving leaders: John Okwoli (WYO): 3 REC, 33 YDS; Jordan Kress (UNM): 4 REC, 94 YDS

=== Nevada ===
	1	2	3	4	Total
Wolf Pack	3	0	0	0	3
Cowboys	14	10	7	0	31

Scoring summary

Quarter	Time	Drive			Team	Scoring information	Score	
Quarter	Time	Plays	Yards	TOP	Team	Scoring information	NEV	WYO
1	13:14	1	53	0:09	WYO	Xazavian Valladay 53-yard touchdown reception from Sean Chambers, Cooper Rothe kick good	0	7
1	8:49	7	52	3:03	WYO	Sean Chambers 2-yard touchdown run, Cooper Rothe kick good	0	14
1	2:21	9	71	3:41	NEV	28-yard field goal by Brandon Talton	3	14
2	9:28	5	42	3:18	WYO	Raghib Ismail Jr. 37-yard touchdown reception from Sean Chambers, Cooper Rothe kick good	3	21
2	0:00	6	92	0:50	WYO	20-yard field goal by Cooper Rothe	3	24
3	11:54	8	75	3:06	WYO	Jackson Marcotte 25-yard touchdown reception from Tyler Vander Waal, Cooper Rothe kick good	3	31
"TOP" = time of possession. For other American football terms, see Glossary of American football.							3	31

- Passing leaders: Sean Chambers (WYO): 6–9, 158 YDS, 2 TD, 1 INT; Carson Strong (NEV): 26–40, 247 YDS, 1 INT
- Rushing leaders: Xazavian Valladay (WYO): 26 CAR, 206 YDS; Devonte Lee (NEV): 3 CAR, 38 YDS
- Receiving leaders: Raghib Ismail Jr. (WYO): 4 REC, 93 YDS, 1 TD; Romeo Doubs (NEV): 5 REC, 98 YDS

=== At Boise State ===
	1	2	3	4	OT	Total
Cowboys	0	10	7	0	0	17
No. 21 Broncos	7	0	3	7	3	20

Scoring summary

Quarter	Time	Drive			Team	Scoring information	Score	
Quarter	Time	Plays	Yards	TOP	Team	Scoring information	WYO	BSU
1	2:05	12	92	7:10	BSU	Akillian Butler 5-yard touchdown reception from Chase Cord, Eric Sachse kick good	0	7
2	4:57	7	47	2:50	WYO	Tyler Vander Waal 3-yard touchdown run, Cooper Rothe kick good	7	7
2	0:01	10	30	2:59	WYO	39-yard field goal by Cooper Rothe	10	7
3	9:18	8	59	3:01	BSU	40-yard field goal by Eric Sachse	10	10
3	2:35	4	36	1:56	WYO	Xazavian Valladay 21-yard touchdown run, Cooper Rothe kick good	17	10
4	5:37	10	57	5:24	BSU	Khalil Shakir 5-yard touchdown run, Eric Sachse kick good	17	17
OT	—	5	14	—	BSU	28-yard field goal by Eric Sachse	17	20
"TOP" = time of possession. For other American football terms, see Glossary of American football.							17	20

- Passing leaders: Tyler Vander Waal (WYO): 15–23, 160 YDS; Chase Cord (BSU): 19–30, 190 YDS, 1 TD, 1 INT
- Rushing leaders: Xazavian Valladay (WYO): 37 CAR, 124 YDS, 1 TD; John Hightower (BSU): 2 CAR, 38 YDS
- Receiving leaders: Josh Harshman (WYO): 6 REC, 48 YDS; Khalil Shakir (BSU): 7 REC, 70 YDS

=== At Utah State ===
	1	2	3	4	Total
Cowboys	0	14	0	7	21
Aggies	0	20	3	3	26

Scoring summary

Quarter	Time	Drive			Team	Scoring information	Score	
Quarter	Time	Plays	Yards	TOP	Team	Scoring information	WYO	USU
2	14:54	2	3	0:48	WYO	Interception returned 10 yards for touchdown by Logan Wilson, Cooper Rothe kick good	7	0
2	11:35	2	84	0:29	USU	Siaosi Mariner 80-yard touchdown reception from Jordan Love, Dominik Eberle kick good	7	7
2	7:32	7	77	1:28	USU	Gerold Bright 35-yard touchdown reception from Jordan Love, Dominik Eberle kick good	7	14
2	5:34	5	61	1:51	WYO	Tyler Vander Waal 11-yard touchdown run, Cooper Rothe kick good	14	14
2	2:04	8	43	3:28	USU	47-yard field goal by Dominik Eberle	14	17
2	0:09	7	30	1:06	USU	44-yard field goal by Dominik Eberle	14	20
3	4:44	4	5	0:54	USU	26-yard field goal by Dominik Eberle	14	23
4	11:11	4	-4	1:37	USU	23-yard field goal by Dominik Eberle	14	26
4	6:52	9	75	4:19	WYO	Tyler Vander Waal 5-yard touchdown run, Cooper Rothe kick good	21	26
"TOP" = time of possession. For other American football terms, see Glossary of American football.							21	26

- Passing leaders: Tyler Vander Waal (WYO): 20–36, 185 YDS, 3 INT; Jordan Love (USU): 18–29, 282 YDS, 2 TD, 2 INT
- Rushing leaders: Xazavian Valladay (WYO): 25 CAR, 114 YDS; Gerold Bright (USU): 17 CAR, 56 YDS
- Receiving leaders: Josh Harshman (WYO): 6 REC, 76 YDS; Siaosi Mariner (USU): 4 REC, 123 YDS, 1 TD

=== Colorado State ===
	1	2	3	4	Total
Rams	0	7	0	0	7
Cowboys	0	7	7	3	17

Scoring summary

Quarter	Time	Drive			Team	Scoring information	Score	
Quarter	Time	Plays	Yards	TOP	Team	Scoring information	CSU	WYO
2	11:52	11	93	5:30	WYO	Tyler Vander Waal 1-yard touchdown run, Cooper Rothe kick good	0	7
2	4:52	13	75	7:00	CSU	Warren Jackson 4-yard touchdown reception from Patrick O'Brien, Braxton Davis kick good	7	7
3	6:04	10	44	5:41	WYO	Levi Williams 1-yard touchdown run, Cooper Rothe kick good	7	14
4	3:33	11	28	5:44	WYO	48-yard field goal by Cooper Rothe	7	17
"TOP" = time of possession. For other American football terms, see Glossary of American football.							7	17

- Passing leaders: Tyler Vander Waal (WYO): 6–13, 56 YDS; Patrick O'Brien (CSU): 17–29, 217 YDS, 1 TD, 1 INT
- Rushing leaders: Xazavian Valladay (WYO): 27 CAR, 154 YDS; Jaylen Thomas (CSU): 14 CAR, 23 YDS
- Receiving leaders: Austin Conway (WYO): 3 REC, 35 YDS; Warren Jackson (CSU): 6 REC, 95 YDS, 1 TD

=== At Air Force ===
	1	2	3	4	Total
Cowboys	0	0	0	6	6
Falcons	0	7	3	10	20

Scoring summary

Quarter	Time	Drive			Team	Scoring information	Score	
Quarter	Time	Plays	Yards	TOP	Team	Scoring information	WYO	AFA
2	14:56	16	73	8:42	AFA	Donald Hammond III 1-yard touchdown run, Jake Koehnke kick good	0	7
3	5:50	13	41	7:10	AFA	31-yard field goal by Jake Koehnke	0	10
4	13:08	16	66	7:42	WYO	26-yard field goal by Cooper Rothe	3	10
4	5:31	9	51	4:10	AFA	27-yard field goal by Jake Koehnke	3	13
4	2:23	5	35	2:58	WYO	23-yard field goal by Cooper Rothe	6	13
4	2:04	2	75	0:19	AFA	Benjamin Waters 75-yard touchdown reception from Donald Hammond III, Jake Koehnke kick good	6	20
"TOP" = time of possession. For other American football terms, see Glossary of American football.							6	20

- Passing leaders: Levi Williams (WYO): 6–11, 84 YDS, 1 INT; Donald Hammond III (AFA): 5–6, 121 YDS, 1 TD
- Rushing leaders: Levi Williams (WYO): 15 CAR, 79 YDS; Kadin Remsberg (AFA): 14 CAR, 63 YDS
- Receiving leaders: Raghib Ismail Jr. (WYO): 3 REC, 41 YDS; Benjamin Waters (AFA): 3 REC, 100 YDS, 1 TD

=== Vs. Georgia State – Arizona Bowl ===
	1	2	3	4	Total
Panthers	7	3	7	0	17
Cowboys	17	7	14	0	38

Scoring summary

Quarter	Time	Drive			Team	Scoring information	Score	
Quarter	Time	Plays	Yards	TOP	Team	Scoring information	GAST	WYO
1	12:59	6	75	2:01	GAST	Dan Ellington 4-yard touchdown run, Brandon Wright kick good	7	0
1	9:01	11	39	3:58	WYO	53-yard field goal by Cooper Rothe	7	3
1	2:12	3	23	0:47	WYO	Austin Conway 18-yard touchdown reception from Levi Williams, Cooper Rothe kick good	7	10
1	0:35	3	11	1:27	WYO	Xazavian Valladay 8-yard touchdown reception from Levi Williams, Cooper Rothe kick good	7	17
2	9:31	13	57	6:04	GAST	25-yard field goal by Brandon Wright	10	17
2	0:32	6	60	1:29	WYO	Ayden Eberhardt 51-yard touchdown reception from Levi Williams, Cooper Rothe kick good	10	24
3	8:12	5	86	2:16	WYO	Xazavian Valladay 1-yard touchdown run, Cooper Rothe kick good	10	31
3	7:43	2	75	0:29	GAST	Cornelius McCoy 44-yard touchdown reception from Dan Ellington, Brandon Wright kick good	17	31
3	1:21	4	74	1:41	WYO	Levi Williams 6-yard touchdown run, Cooper Rothe kick good	17	38
"TOP" = time of possession. For other American football terms, see Glossary of American football.							17	38

- Passing leaders: Levi Williams (WYO): 11–26, 234 YDS, 3 TD, 1 INT; Dan Ellington (GAST): 13–26, 156 YDS, 1 TD, 1 INT
- Rushing leaders: Xazavian Valladay (WYO): 26 CAR, 204 YDS, 1 TD; Dan Ellington (GAST): 14 CAR, 70 YDS, 1 TD
- Receiving leaders: Xazavian Valladay (WYO): 3 REC, 91 YDS, 1 TD; Cornelius McCoy (GAST): 5 REC, 78 YDS, 1 TD

== Personnel ==
=== Coaching staff ===
Name	Position	Seasons at Wyoming	Alma mater	Before Wyoming
Craig Bohl	Head coach	6	Nebraska (1982)	North Dakota State – head coach (2013)
Brent Vigen	Associate head coach / offensive coordinator / quarterbacks	6	North Dakota State (1998)	North Dakota State – Offensive coordinator / quarterbacks coach (2013)
Jake Dickert	Defensive coordinator / Linebackers	3	Wisconsin–Stevens Point (2007)	South Dakota State – Co-Special Teams Coordinator / safeties coach (2016)
Aaron Bohl	Linebackers	3	Minnesota State–Moorhead (2016)	Wyoming – Graduate assistant (2018)
A. J. Cooper	Defensive run game coordinator / Defensive Ends / Co-Special Teams Coordinator	6	North Dakota State (2006)	North Dakota State – Defensive ends coach / Co-Special Teams Coordinator (2013)
Willie Mack Garza	Safeties	1	Texas (1993)	Dixie State – Defensive coordinator / defensive backs coach (2018)
Mike Grant	Wide receivers	4	Nebraska (1993)	North Texas – Wide receivers coach / receiving coordinator (2014)
Gordie Haug	Running Backs / Director of player personnel	6	Bemidji State (2009)	North Dakota State – Running backs coach (2013)
Pete Kaligis	Defensive tackles / Nose Tackles	11	Washington (1994)	Montana – Offensive line coach (2008)
Bart Miller	Offensive line	1	New Mexico (1997)	Ohio – Offensive line coach (2018)
Shannon Moore	Co-Special teams coordinator / tight ends / Fullbacks	1	Black Hills State (2000)	East Carolina – Tight ends coach / recruiting coordinator (2018)
John Richardson	Cornerbacks	6	North Dakota State (2010)	North Dakota State – Cornerbacks coach (2013)
Ben Iannacchione	Director of Sports Performance / Head Football Strength and Conditioning	2	Boise State (2008)	LSU – Associate strength and conditioning coach (2017)

=== Roster ===
2019 Wyoming Cowboys Football
Quarterback: 12 Sean Chambers (C) (injured) – (redshirt) freshman (6'3", 218); 15 Levi Williams – freshman (6'5", 208); 18 Tyler Vander Waal – (redshirt) sophomore (6'4", 214); 20 Ryan Marquez – (redshirt) freshman (6'1", 184); Tailback: 6 Xazavian Valladay – (redshirt) sophomore (6'0", 196); 7 Trey Smith (injured) – graduate (6'0", 218); 21 Jeremy Hollingsworth – freshman (5'9", 205); 23 Alphonzo Andrews Jr. – freshman (5'10", 185); 27 Brett Brenton – (redshirt) freshman (5'10", 195); 28 Austen Clemetson – (redshirt) freshman (5'9", 185); 30 Dawaiian McNeely – freshman (6'2", 206); 36 Titus Swen (injured) – freshman (5'11", 190); Fullback: 34 Jeff Burroughs – (redshirt) junior (6'1", 233); 35 Skyler Miller – (redshirt) junior (5'11", 226); 37 Tristan Dietz – (redshirt) freshman (5'11", 205); 45 Jaylon Watson – (redshirt) senior (6'0", 241); Wide receiver: 3 Wyatt Wieland – (redshirt) freshman (6'1", 191); 4 Devin Jennings – freshman (6'2", 175); 8 Dontae Crow – (redshirt) junior (5'9", 178); 9 Alex Brown – freshman (6'4", 190); 13 John Okwoli – senior (6'2", 210); 16 Gunner Gentry – sophomore (6'3", 208); 17 Raghib Ismail Jr. – senior (6'0", 170); 19 Ayden Eberhardt – (redshirt) junior (6'2", 195); 25 Austin Conway (C) – (redshirt) senior (5'10", 183); 26 Isaiah Neyor – freshman (6'3", 195); 39 Justyn Stindt – (redshirt) sophomore (6'2", 192); 85 Maeson Gallegos – (redshirt) freshman (6'2", 165); 87 Chance Hofer – (redshirt) freshman (6'0", 191); Tight end: 32 Jahmari Moore – (redshirt) junior (6'2", 236); 33 Josh Harshman (C) – (redshirt) senior (6'3", 240); 80 Parker Christensen – freshman (6'2", 210); 81 Treyton Welch – freshman (6'3", 207); 82 Jackson Marcotte (injured) – (redshirt) freshman (6'7", 250); 83 Vance Brazile – freshman (6'4", 225); 84 Nate Weinman – (redshirt) sophomore (6'7", 267)	Offensive lineman: 50 Jack Lookabaugh – freshman (6'5", 292); 55 Gavin Rush (injured) – (redshirt) junior (6'3", 300); 57 Patrick Arnold – (redshirt) sophomore (6'3", 296); 58 Latrell Bible – freshman (6'4", 262); 60 Marco Machado – (redshirt) freshman (6'4", 312); 62 Rudy Stofer – (redshirt) sophomore (6'6", 297); 63 Jason Davis – (redshirt) sophomore (6'3", 336); 65 Zach Watts – (redshirt) freshman (6'5", 285); 66 Connor Schopp – freshman (6'6", 250); 68 Mason Schultz – freshman (6'4", 245); 69 Eric Abojei (injured) – (redshirt) sophomore (6'5", 354); 70 Tristen Lee – (redshirt) freshman (6'7", 240); 71 Carlos Harrison – freshman (6'4", 285); 72 Wade Picray – freshman (6'3", 235); 73 Keegan Cryder – (redshirt) sophomore (6'4", 297); 74 Blayne Baker – (redshirt) freshman (6'5", 305); 75 Frank Crum – (redshirt) freshman (6'7", 300); 77 Gavin Dunayski – (redshirt) sophomore (6'6", 261); 78 Alonzo Velasquez – junior (6'6", 310); 79 Logan Harris – junior (6'3", 304); Defensive lineman: 29 Leevi Lafaele (injured) – (redshirt) freshman (6'2", 224); 41 Davon Wells-Ross – (redshirt) sophomore (6'5", 212); 44 Victor Jones – (redshirt) sophomore (6'4", 256); 49 Teagan Liufau – (redshirt) freshman (6'3", 232); 51 Solomon Byrd – (redshirt) freshman (6'4", 243); 52 Jack Boyer – (redshirt) freshman (6'4", 207); 53 Josiah Hall (C) – (redshirt) senior (6'1", 236); 55 Claude Cole – (redshirt) freshman (6'4", 276); 76 Justis Borton – junior (6'2", 282); 86 Javaree Jackson (S) – junior (6'5", 276); 87 Akili Bonner – freshman (6'4", 220); 88 Garrett Crall – junior (6'5", 242); 91 Jaylen Pate – freshman (6'3", 220); 92 Alonzo Hall – freshman (6'5", 230); 93 DeVonne Harris – freshman (6'4", 220); 94 Cole Godbout – (redshirt) freshman (6'4", 262); 96 Jordan Bertagnole – freshman (6'4", 220); 97 Mario Mora – (redshirt) freshman (6'3", 264); 98 Ravontae Holt (injured) – junior (6'4", 272)	Linebackers: 18 Keyon Blankenbaker – (redshirt) sophomore (5'10", 175); 25 Isaiah Abdullah – freshman (6'3", 190); 28 Easton Gibbs – freshman (6'2", 200); 30 Logan Wilson (C) – (redshirt) senior (6'2", 250); 34 Charles Hicks – (redshirt) freshman (6'3", 220); 36 Brennan Kutterer – (redshirt) sophomore (6'1", 206); 38 Ray Rabou – (redshirt) freshman (6'2", 210); 43 Ben Wisdorf (injured) – (redshirt) senior (6'1", 221); 46 Cassh Maluia – senior (6'0", 248); 48 Chad Muma – sophomore (6'3", 220); 54 Shae Suiaunoa – freshman (6'3", 200); Defensive backs: 2 Cameron Murray – (redshirt) freshman (6'1", 170); 3 Alijah Halliburton – senior (6'2", 190); 5 Esaias Gandy – junior (6'1", 193); 6 Jordan Murry – freshman (5'10", 150); 8 Rome Weber – (redshirt) freshman (5'11", 186); 9 Tyler Hall – senior (5'10", 190); 12 Keonte Glinton – freshman (6'0", 175); 13 Jerome Cooper – freshman (6'0", 165); 14 Miles Williams – sophomore (6'1", 199); 19 Jack Thiele – freshman (6'0", 180); 20 Azizi Hearn – sophomore (6'1", 193); 21 C.J. Coldon (injured) – (redshirt) sophomore (6'1", 183); 22 Caleb Roberson – freshman (5'7", 175); 26 Braden Smith – (redshirt) junior (5'10", 184); 27 Bryce Levinson – (redshirt) freshman (6'0", 190); 33 Dalton Schroeder – freshman (5'10", 180); 40 Taylor Dodd – (redshirt) sophomore (6'2", 201); 47 Blake Harrington – (redshirt) freshman (5'11", 180); Placekicker: 40 Cooper Rothe – senior (6'0", 192); 42 Luke Glassrock – freshman (5'10", 170); Punter: 27 Tim Zaleski – junior (6'5", 221); 41 Ryan Galovich – senior (5'11", 178); Holder: 11 Nick Szpor – senior (6'3", 205); Long snapper: 99 Jesse Hooper – sophomore (5'11", 232); Legend: (C) Team captain; (S) Suspended; (I) Ineligible; Injured; Redshirt

=== 2019 recruiting class ===
The Cowboys announced an early signing class of 18 high school student athletes on December 19, 2018. On January 28, 2019, the Cowboys added Levi Williams to their recruiting class. The Cowboys completed their recruiting class by adding five more recruits on February 6.

College recruiting
Name	Hometown	School	Height	Weight	Commit date
Isaiah Abdullah; LB	Los Angeles, CA	Wilson Senior HS	6 ft 3 in (1.91 m)	190 lb (86 kg)	Dec 2, 2018
Isaiah Abdullah; LB	Recruit ratings: Scout: Rivals: 247Sports: ESPN:				
Alphonzo Andrews Jr. RB	St. Louis, MO	Trinity Catholic HS	5 ft 8 in (1.73 m)	175 lb (79 kg)	Feb 5, 2019
Alphonzo Andrews Jr. RB	Recruit ratings: Scout: Rivals: 247Sports: ESPN:				
Latrell Bible; OL	Minneapolis, MN	Washburn HS	6 ft 4 in (1.93 m)	265 lb (120 kg)	Nov 7, 2018
Latrell Bible; OL	Recruit ratings: Scout: Rivals: 247Sports:				
Alex Brown; WR	Spring, TX	Klein Collins HS	6 ft 4 in (1.93 m)	185 lb (84 kg)	Dec 2, 2018
Alex Brown; WR	Recruit ratings: Scout: Rivals: 247Sports: ESPN:				
Parker Christensen; TE	Sheridan, WY	Sheridan HS	6 ft 2 in (1.88 m)	205 lb (93 kg)	Jul 1, 2018
Parker Christensen; TE	Recruit ratings: Scout: Rivals: 247Sports: ESPN:				
Jerome Cooper; S	Los Angeles, CA	Locke HS	5 ft 11 in (1.80 m)	165 lb (75 kg)	Dec 19, 2018
Jerome Cooper; S	Recruit ratings: Scout: Rivals: 247Sports: ESPN:				
Easton Gibbs; LB	Temecula, CA	Temecula Valley HS	6 ft 1 in (1.85 m)	205 lb (93 kg)	Aug 9, 2018
Easton Gibbs; LB	Recruit ratings: Scout: Rivals: 247Sports: ESPN:				
Keonte Glinton; S	Bakersfield, CA	Bakersfield Christian HS	6 ft 0 in (1.83 m)	170 lb (77 kg)	Nov 5, 2018
Keonte Glinton; S	Recruit ratings: Scout: Rivals: 247Sports: ESPN:				
Alonzo Hall; DE	Reseda, CA	Reseda HS	6 ft 5 in (1.96 m)	230 lb (100 kg)	Feb 6, 2019
Alonzo Hall; DE	Recruit ratings: Scout: Rivals: 247Sports: ESPN:				
DeVonne Harris; DE	Big Lake, MN	Big Lake HS	6 ft 4 in (1.93 m)	220 lb (100 kg)	Nov 10, 2018
DeVonne Harris; DE	Recruit ratings: Scout: Rivals: 247Sports: ESPN:				
Carlos Harrison; OL	Carlsbad, CA	Carlsbad HS	6 ft 4 in (1.93 m)	285 lb (129 kg)	Dec 19, 2018
Carlos Harrison; OL	Recruit ratings: Scout: Rivals: 247Sports: ESPN:				
Devin Jennings; WR	Houston, TX	Channelview HS	6 ft 2 in (1.88 m)	163 lb (74 kg)	Dec 16, 2018
Devin Jennings; WR	Recruit ratings: Scout: Rivals: 247Sports: ESPN:				
Jack Lookabaugh; OL	Coppell, TX	Coppell HS	6 ft 5 in (1.96 m)	285 lb (129 kg)	Dec 18, 2018
Jack Lookabaugh; OL	Recruit ratings: Scout: Rivals: 247Sports: ESPN:				
Dawaiian McNeely; RB	Modesto, CA	Central Catholic HS	6 ft 2 in (1.88 m)	206 lb (93 kg)	Feb 6, 2019
Dawaiian McNeely; RB	Recruit ratings: Scout: Rivals: 247Sports: ESPN:				
Naphtali Moimoi; DT	Hayward, CA	Hayward HS	6 ft 4 in (1.93 m)	245 lb (111 kg)	Dec 4, 2018
Naphtali Moimoi; DT	Recruit ratings: Scout: Rivals: 247Sports: ESPN:				
Jordan Murry; CB	Riverside, CA	Martin Luther King HS	5 ft 10 in (1.78 m)	150 lb (68 kg)	Dec 19, 2018
Jordan Murry; CB	Recruit ratings: Scout: Rivals: 247Sports: ESPN:				
Isaiah Neyor; WR	Fort Worth, TX	Lamar HS	6 ft 3 in (1.91 m)	195 lb (88 kg)	Dec 18, 2018
Isaiah Neyor; WR	Recruit ratings: Scout: Rivals: 247Sports: ESPN:				
Jaylen Pate; DE	Chicago, IL	Lane Technical HS	6 ft 3 in (1.91 m)	220 lb (100 kg)	Dec 4, 2018
Jaylen Pate; DE	Recruit ratings: Scout: Rivals: 247Sports: ESPN:				
Caleb Roberson; CB	St. Louis, MO	Cardinal Ritter HS	5 ft 11 in (1.80 m)	175 lb (79 kg)	Oct 19, 2019
Caleb Roberson; CB	Recruit ratings: Scout: Rivals: 247Sports: ESPN:				
Allen Smith; CB	Culver City, CA	Culver City, HS	5 ft 8 in (1.73 m)	150 lb (68 kg)	Sep 17, 2018
Allen Smith; CB	Recruit ratings: Scout: Rivals: 247Sports: ESPN:				
Shae Suiaunoa; LB	Houston, TX	Clear Lake HS	6 ft 2 in (1.88 m)	210 lb (95 kg)	Feb 5, 2019
Shae Suiaunoa; LB	Recruit ratings: Scout: Rivals: 247Sports: ESPN:				
Titus Swen; RB	Fort Worth, TX	Eaton HS	5 ft 11 in (1.80 m)	190 lb (86 kg)	Feb 6, 2019
Titus Swen; RB	Recruit ratings: Scout: Rivals: 247Sports: ESPN:				
Treyton Welch; TE	Buffalo, MN	Buffalo HS	6 ft 3 in (1.91 m)	205 lb (93 kg)	Sep 13, 2018
Treyton Welch; TE	Recruit ratings: Scout: Rivals: 247Sports: ESPN:				
Levi Williams; QB	Spring Branch, TX	Smithson Valley HS	6 ft 4 in (1.93 m)	200 lb (91 kg)	Jan 20, 2019
Levi Williams; QB	Recruit ratings: Scout: Rivals: 247Sports: ESPN:				
Overall recruit ranking: Scout: 97 Rivals: – 247Sports: 97 ESPN: –
Note: In many cases, Scout, Rivals, 247Sports, On3, and ESPN may conflict in their listings of height and weight.; In these cases, the average was taken. ESPN grades are on a 100-point scale.; Sources: "2019 Team Ranking". Rivals.com.

== Awards and honors ==
=== All-conference ===
Position	Player	Class	Team
First Team Offense
RB	Xazavian Valladay	Sophomore	Wyoming
First Team Defense
LB	Logan Wilson	Senior	Wyoming
DB	Alijah Halliburton	Senior	Wyoming

Position	Player	Class	Team
Second Team Offense
OL	Keegan Cryder	Sophomore	Wyoming
Second Team Special teams
PR	Austin Conway	Senior	Wyoming

Honorable Mentions

- Tyler Hall, Sr., DB
- Logan Harris, Jr., OL
- Cassh Maluia, Sr., LB

=== All-Americans ===
Position	Player	School	Selector	Unanimous	Consensus
Second Team All-Americans
LB	Logan Wilson	Wyoming	USAT		

Position	Player	School	Selector	Unanimous	Consensus
Third Team All-Americans
LB	Logan Wilson	Wyoming	AP		

=== All-star games ===
Logan Wilson, LB – Senior Bowl

Cooper Rothe, PK – East–West Shrine Bowl

== Statistics ==
=== Team ===
Team Statistics
	Wyoming	Opponents
Points	330	231
First Downs	232	266
Rushing	129	90
Passing	82	154
Penalty	21	22
Rushing Yards	2804	1392
Rushing Attempts	575	477
Average Per Rush	4.9	2.9
Long	80	40
Rushing TDs	27	10
Passing Yards	1770	3337
Comp–Att	120–256	266–464
Comp %	46.9%	57.3%
Average Per Game	136.2	256.7
Average per Attempt	6.9	7.2
Passing TDs	11	15
INT's	9	12
Touchdowns	41	25
Passing	27	10
Rushing	11	15
Defensive	3	0
Interceptions	12	9
Yards	199	99
Total Offense	4574	4729
Total Plays	831	941
Average Per Yards/Game	351.8	363.8
Kick Returns: # – Yards	11–305	17–340
TDs	0	0
Long	58	32
Punts	68	68
Yards	2816	2836
Average	41.4	41.7
Punt Returns: # – Yards	34–366	21–146
TDs	0	0
Long	45	43
Fumbles – Fumbles Lost	10–6	16–8
Penalties – Yards	67–634	69–606
3rd–Down Conversions	81/186	75/200
4th–Down Conversions	6/12	12/25
Field Goals	15–22	19–26
Sacks	31	21
Yards	220	142

=== Offense ===
Passing Statistics
NAME	GP	CMP	ATT	YDS	CMP%	TD	INT	RAT
Sean Chambers	8	52	121	915	43.0	7	3	120.63
Tyler Vander Waal	8	49	95	512	51.6	1	4	91.90
Levi Williams	3	19	39	343	48.7	3	2	137.72
Austin Conway	13	0	1	0	0.0	0	0	0.00
TOTALS	13	120	256	1770	46.9	11	9	112.10

Rushing Statistics
NAME	GP	CAR	YDS	AVG	LONG	TD
Xazavian Valladay	12	247	1265	5.1	62	6
Sean Chambers	8	90	567	6.3	75	10
Titus Swen	8	67	349	5.2	59	1
Trey Smith	4	44	227	5.2	80	3
Levi Williams	3	40	181	4.5	38	2
Brett Brenton	10	29	172	5.9	41	0
Raghib Ismail Jr.	12	6	38	6.3	12	1
Austin Conway	13	6	15	4.5	9	0
Jeff Burroughs	13	8	15	1.9	4	0
Alphonzo Andrews Jr.	1	1	1	1.0	1	0
TEAM	11	10	−19	-1.9	0	0
Tyler Vander Waal	8	27	−19	-0.7	11	4
TOTALS	13	575	2804	4.9	80	27

Receiving Statistics
NAME	GP	REC	YDS	AVG	LONG	TD
Raghib Ismail Jr.	12	23	355	15.4	37	2
Austin Conway	13	23	314	13.7	28	1
Josh Harshman	13	20	264	13.2	56	2
Xazavian Valladay	12	11	211	19.2	63	2
Jackson Marcotte	10	9	127	14.1	25	2
John Okwoli	13	9	74	8.2	15	0
Ayden Eberhardt	13	8	168	21.0	53	2
Gunner Gentry	13	6	130	21.7	45	0
Dontae Crow	12	5	70	14.0	34	0
Titus Swen	8	3	46	15.3	24	0
Brett Brenton	10	2	16	8.0	11	0
Tyler Vander Waal	8	1	-5	-5.0	0	0
TOTALS	13	120	1770	14.8	63	11

=== Defense ===
Defensive Statistics
#	NAME	GP	SOLO	AST	TOT	TFL-YDS	SACKS	INT	BU	QBH	FR	FF	BLK	SAF
3	Alijah Halliburton	13	73	57	130	11.0–42	2.0–16	2	1	2	1	0	0	0
30	Logan Wilson	13	62	43	105	8.5–28	1.0–7	4	7	2	0	1	0	0
46	Cassh Maluia	13	33	28	61	7.0–13	0.5–0	2	1	1	0	0	0	0
18	Keyon Blankenbaker	13	38	19	57	0.0–0	0.0–0	0	10	0	0	1	0	0
88	Garrett Crall	13	22	33	55	6.0–39	4.5–36	0	2	4	1	0	0	0
48	Chad Muma	13	28	23	51	3.0–10	1.0–8	0	1	1	0	0	0	0
51	Solomon Byrd	12	22	23	45	9.5–52	6.5–44	0	1	3	1	2	0	0
8	Rome Weber	13	30	8	38	2.0–13	1.0–11	1	4	0	0	1	0	0
20	Azizi Hearn	13	26	11	37	1.0–2	0.0–0	0	4	0	0	0	0	0
9	Tyler Hall	12	26	11	37	0.0–0	0.0–0	1	8	0	0	1	0	0
86	Javaree Jackson	13	16	19	35	7.0–21	3.0–13	1	0	3	1	1	0	0
94	Cole Godbout	13	20	14	34	6.0–16	2.0–11	0	1	0	0	0	0	0
53	Josiah Hall	11	10	14	24	6.5–29	3.0–21	0	1	0	0	0	0	0
5	Esaias Gandy	12	13	11	24	2.0–3	0.0–0	0	2	0	2	1	0	0
97	Mario Mora	11	8	14	22	3.5–22	2.0–18	0	0	0	1	1	0	0
6	Jordan Murry	10	18	3	21	0.0–0	0.0–0	0	2	0	0	0	0	0
44	Victor Jones	10	9	11	20	3.0–11	1.5–8	0	0	0	0	0	0	0
21	C.J. Coldon	3	11	3	14	1.0–2	0.0–0	0	2	0	1	0	0	0
1	Davon Wells-Ross	12	9	4	13	2.5–19	2.0–18	0	0	0	0	1	0	0
26	Braden Smith	13	6	5	11	0.0–0	0.0–0	1	1	0	0	0	0	0
49	Tegan Liufau	11	7	2	9	2.5–11	1.0–9	0	0	0	0	0	0	0
19	Ayden Eberhardt	13	6	2	8	0.0–0	0.0–0	0	0	0	0	1	0	0
55	Claude Cole	10	5	1	6	0.0–0	0.0–0	0	0	0	0	0	0	0
43	Ben Wisdorf	9	3	2	5	0.0–0	0.0–0	0	0	0	0	1	0	0
34	Charles Hicks	12	3	1	4	0.0–0	0.0–0	0	0	0	0	0	0	0
14	Miles Williams	13	2	2	4	0.0–0	0.0–0	0	0	0	0	0	0	0
2	Cameron Murray	13	1	2	3	0.0–0	0.0–0	0	0	0	0	0	0	0
40	Cooper Rothe	13	1	2	3	0.0–0	0.0–0	0	0	0	0	0	0	0
41	Ryan Galovich	13	1	1	2	0.0–0	0.0–0	0	0	0	0	0	0	0
45	Jaylon Watson	12	0	2	2	0.0–0	0.0–0	0	0	0	0	0	0	0
1	Bryce Levinson	4	1	0	1	0.0–0	0.0–0	0	0	0	0	0	0	0
13	John Okwoli	13	1	0	1	0.0–0	0.0–0	0	0	0	0	0	0	0
47	Blake Harrington	2	0	1	1	0.0–0	0.0–0	0	0	0	0	0	0	0
78	Alonzo Velazquez	9	1	0	1	0.0–0	0.0–0	0	0	0	0	0	0	0
7	Trey Smith	4	1	0	1	0.0–0	0.0–0	0	0	0	0	0	0	0
79	Logan Harris	11	1	0	1	0.0–0	0.0–0	0	0	0	0	0	0	0
54	Shae Suaunoa	3	0	1	1	0.0–0	0.0–0	0	0	0	0	0	0	0
TM	Team	10	1	0	1	1.0–1	0.0–0	0	1	0	0	1	0	0
10	Tyler Vander Waal	8	1	0	1	0.0	0	0	0	0	0	0	0	
	TOTAL	13	516	376	892	83–334	31–220	12	48	17	8	14	0	0
	OPPONENTS	13	476	410	886	60–238	21–142	9	37	10	6	8	3	0

Key: SOLO: Solo Tackles, AST: Assisted Tackles, TOT: Total Tackles, TFL: Tackles-for-loss, SACK: Quarterback Sacks, INT: Interceptions, BU: Passes Broken Up, QBH: Quarterback Hits, FF: Forced Fumbles, FR: Fumbles Recovered, BLK: Kicks or Punts Blocked, SAF: Safeties

Interceptions Statistics
NAME	NO.	YDS	AVG	TD	LNG
Logan Wilson	4	47	11.8	1	21
Alijah Halliburton	2	23	11.5	0	23
Cassh Maluia	2	30	15.0	0	30
Rome Weber	1	0	0.0	0	0
Braden Smith	1	27	27.0	0	27
Javaree Jackson	1	0	0.0	0	0
Tyler Hall	1	72	72.0	1	72
TOTALS	12	199	16.6	2	72

=== Special teams ===
Kicking statistics
NAME	XPM	XPA	XP%	FGM	FGA	FG%	1–19	20–29	30–39	40–49	50+	LNG	PTS
Cooper Rothe	37	40	92.5%	15	22	68.2%	2–2	6–6	3–5	3–6	1–1	53	82
TOTALS	37	40	92.5%	15	22	68.2%	2–2	6–6	3–5	3–6	1–1	53	82

Kick return statistics
NAME	RTNS	YDS	AVG	TD	LNG
Tyler Hall	8	267	33.4	0	58
Keyon Blankenbaker	1	1	1.0	0	1
Xazavian Valladay	1	13	13.0	0	13
Austin Conway	1	24	24.0	0	24
TOTALS	11	305	27.7	0	58

Punting statistics
NAME	PUNTS	YDS	AVG	LONG	TB	FC	I–20	50+	BLK
Ryan Galovich	63	2653	42.1	64	5	22	14	9	1
Tim Zaleski	3	134	44.7	51	0	1	1	1	0
TEAM	2	29	14.5	19	0	0	0	0	1
TOTALS	68	2816	41.4	64	5	23	15	10	2

Punt return statistics
NAME	RTNS	YDS	AVG	TD	LONG
Austin Conway	34	366	10.8	0	45
TOTALS	34	366	10.8	0	45

== Players drafted into the NFL ==
Round	Pick	Player	Position	NFL Club
3	65	Logan Wilson	LB	Cincinnati Bengals
6	204	Cassh Maluia	LB	New England Patriots
UDFA		Tyler Hall	CB	Atlanta Falcons
