= 2020 Wyoming Cowboys football team =

American college football season

2020 Wyoming Cowboys football
- Conference: Mountain West Conference
- Record: 2–4 (2–4 MW)
- Head coach: Craig Bohl (7th season)
- Offensive coordinator: Brent Vigen (7th season)
- Offensive scheme: Pro-style, West Coast
- Defensive coordinator: Jay Sawvel (1st season)
- Base defense: 4–3
- Home stadium: War Memorial Stadium

Uniform
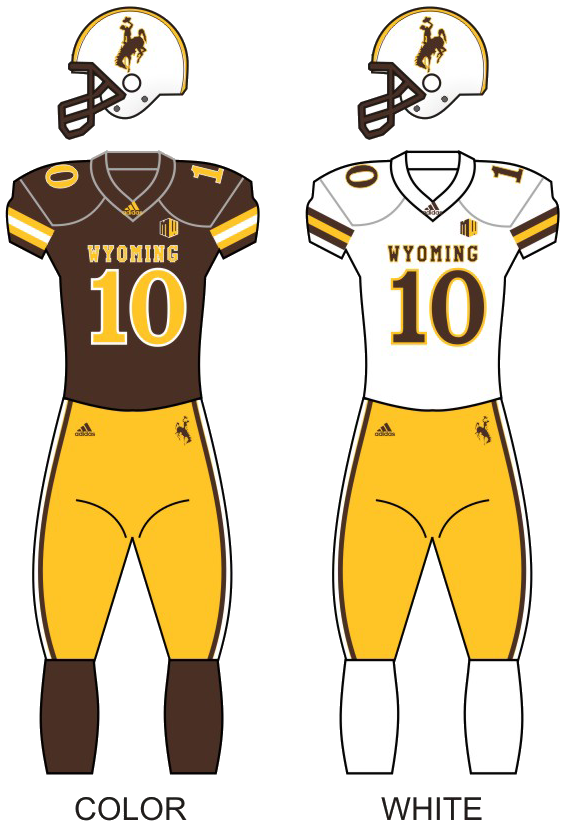

2020 Mountain West Conference football standings
	Conf.			Overall
Team	W		L	W		L
No. 24 San Jose State y$	6	–	0	7	–	1
Boise State y	5	–	0	5	–	2
Nevada	6	–	2	7	–	2
San Diego State	4	–	2	4	–	4
Hawaii	4	–	4	5	–	4
Fresno State	3	–	3	3	–	3
Air Force	2	–	2	3	–	3
Wyoming	2	–	4	2	–	4
New Mexico	2	–	5	2	–	5
Colorado State	1	–	3	1	–	3
Utah State	1	–	5	1	–	5
UNLV	0	–	6	0	–	6
Championship: San Jose State 34, Boise State 20
$ – Conference champion; y – Championship game participant; Note: Due to COVID-19, the Mountain West suspended the season, but later decided to begin play on October 24.; Rankings from AP Poll

The 2020 Wyoming Cowboys football team represented the University of Wyoming as a member Mountain West Conference (MW) during the 2020 NCAA Division I FBS football season. Led by seventh-year head coach Craig Bohl, the Cowboys compiled an overall record of 2–4 record with an identical mark in conference play, placing eighth in the MW. The team played home games at War Memorial Stadium in Laramie, Wyoming.

The season was suspended on August 10, 2020, due to the COVID-19 pandemic. However, the Mountain West Conference board of directors later decided to play an eight-game season, starting on October 24.

== Schedule ==
Wyoming announced its 2020 football schedule on February 26, 2020. The original 2020 schedule consisted of six home and six away games in the regular season. On August 10, the Mountain West Conference announced the suspension of the football season due to the COVID-19 pandemic. On September 25, the Mountain West Conference announced that they would be playing an eight-game schedule, to start October 24. The team's non conference games against Weber State, Louisiana, Utah, and Ball State remained canceled. Additionally, a game against Hawaii replaced a game against San Diego State. On November 8, the scheduled November 14 game against Air Force was canceled by the Mountain West Conference due to an uptick in COVID-19 cases within the Air Force football team and Academy. On November 18, the scheduled November 19 game against Utah State was canceled by the Mountain West Conference due to rising COVID-19 cases in the Utah State program.

Date	Time	Opponent	Site	TV	Result	Attendance
October 24	5:00 p.m.	at Nevada	Mackay Stadium; Reno, NV	CBSSN	L 34–37 ^{OT}	250
October 30	7:45 p.m.	Hawaii	War Memorial Stadium; Laramie, WY (rivalry)	FS1	W 31–7	6,232
November 5	7:00 p.m.	at Colorado State	Canvas Stadium; Fort Collins, CO (Border War)	CBSSN	L 24–34	0
November 14	8:00 p.m.	Air Force	War Memorial Stadium; Laramie, WY	CBSSN	Cancelled	
November 19	7:00 p.m.	Utah State	War Memorial Stadium; Laramie, WY		Cancelled	
November 27	2:00 p.m.	at UNLV	Allegiant Stadium; Paradise, NV	FS1	W 45–14	0
December 5	8:30 p.m.	at New Mexico	Sam Boyd Stadium; Whitney, NV	CBSSN	L 16–17	0
December 12	4:00 p.m.	Boise State	War Memorial Stadium; Laramie, WY	CBSSN	L 9–17	2,978
All times are in Mountain time

== Preseason ==
=== Award watch lists ===
Listed in the order that they were released

Award	Player	Position	Year
Doak Walker Award	Xazavian Valladay	RB	JR
Outland Trophy	Keegan Cryder	C	JR
Maxwell Award	Xazavian Valladay	RB	JR

=== Mountain West media days ===
Mountain West media days were originally scheduled for July 16–17 at SoFi Stadium in Los Angeles, California, but were canceled in favor of virtual media days due to the COVID-19 pandemic. On July 20, the virtual media days were canceled. The division predicted order of finish was released July 21, the preseason all-conference team was released on July 22, and preseason individual awards were released on July 23.

Wyoming was picked to finish second in the Mountain Division in the Mountain West preseason poll. The divisions were later suspended for the 2020 season.

==== Preseason All-Mountain West ====
All-Mountain West Offense
Position	Player	Class	Team
RB	Xazavian Valladay	Jr.	Wyoming
OL	Keegan Cryder	Jr.	Wyoming

== Game summaries ==
=== At Nevada ===
	1	2	3	4	OT	Total
Cowboys	3	3	7	18	3	34
Wolf Pack	7	7	14	3	6	37

Scoring summary

Quarter	Time	Drive			Team	Scoring information	Score	
Quarter	Time	Plays	Yards	TOP	Team	Scoring information	WYO	NEV
1	6:25	10	78	3:26	Nevada	Tory Horton 26-yard touchdown reception from Carson Strong, Brandon Talton kick good	0	7
1	2:38	5	16	1:23	Wyoming	27-yard field goal by John Hoyland	3	7
2	14:57	5	51	1:44	Wyoming	36-yard field goal by John Hoyland	6	7
2	1:46	1	50	0:08	Nevada	Cole Turner 50-yard touchdown reception from Carson Strong, Brandon Talton kick good	6	14
3	10:30	9	94	4:26	Nevada	Avery Morrow 18-yard touchdown run, Brandon Talton kick good	6	21
3	3:47	10	66	5:05	Nevada	Cole Turner 10-yard touchdown reception from Carson Strong, Brandon Talton kick good	6	28
3	2:50	3	65	0:57	Wyoming	Levi Williams 21-yard touchdown run, John Hoyland kick good	13	28
4	13:13	8	65	3:32	Wyoming	Gunner Gentry 22-yard touchdown reception from Levi Williams, John Hoyland kick good	20	28
4	8:30	6	59	2:56	Wyoming	Levi Williams 8-yard touchdown run, 2-point pass good	28	28
4	3:26	4	5	1:44	Nevada	21-yard field goal by Brandon Talton	28	31
4	0:23	11	74	1:07	Wyoming	42-yard field goal by John Hoyland	31	31
OT		4	4		Wyoming	38-yard field goal by John Hoyland	34	31
OT		4	25		Nevada	Romeo Doubs 9-yard touchdown reception from Carson Strong, no kick —	34	37
"TOP" = time of possession. For other American football terms, see Glossary of American football.							34	37

- Passing leaders: Levi Williams (WYO): 16–31, 227 YDS, 1 TD, 1 INT; Carson Strong (NEV): 39–52, 420 YDS, 4 TD
- Rushing leaders: Xazavian Valladay (WYO): 22 CAR, 87 YDS; Devonte Lee (NEV): 18 CAR, 65 YDS
- Receiving leaders: Isaiah Neyor (WYO): 3 REC, 102 YDS; Cole Turner (NEV): 7 REC, 119 YDS, 2 TD

=== Hawaii ===
	1	2	3	4	Total
Rainbow Warriors	0	7	0	0	7
Cowboys	10	0	7	14	31

Scoring summary

Quarter	Time	Drive			Team	Scoring information	Score	
Quarter	Time	Plays	Yards	TOP	Team	Scoring information	HAW	WYO
1	12:53	5	62	2:07	Wyoming	Xazavian Valladay 18-yard touchdown run, John Hoyland kick good	0	7
1	9:55	6	12	2:19	Wyoming	30-yard field goal by John Hoyland	0	10
2	1:04	6	80	2:35	Hawaii	Dae Dae Hunter 3-yard touchdown run, Matthew Shipley kick good	7	10
3	4:22	11	75	4:51	Wyoming	Trey Smith 1-yard touchdown run, John Hoyland kick good	7	17
4	8:19	4	17	1:48	Wyoming	Xazavian Valladay 6-yard touchdown run, John Hoyland kick good	7	24
4	1:48	8	38	4:38	Wyoming	Trey Smith 2-yard touchdown run, John Hoyland kick good	7	31
"TOP" = time of possession. For other American football terms, see Glossary of American football.							7	31

- Passing leaders: Levi Williams (WYO): 9–18, 112 YDS; Chevan Cordeiro (HAW): 11–26, 110 YDS, 1 INT
- Rushing leaders: Xazavian Valladay (WYO): 32 CAR, 163 YDS, 2 TD; Miles Reed (HAW): 7 CAR, 54 YDS
- Receiving leaders: Xazavian Valladay (WYO): 2 REC, 32 YDS; Zion Bowens (HAW): 1 REC, 47 YDS

=== At Colorado State ===
	1	2	3	4	Total
Cowboys	0	14	3	7	24
Rams	14	10	7	3	34

Scoring summary

Quarter	Time	Drive			Team	Scoring information	Score	
Quarter	Time	Plays	Yards	TOP	Team	Scoring information	WYO	CSU
1	12:03	3	-2	0:53	Colorado State	Interception returned 30 yards for touchdown by Marshaun Cameron, Robert Liss kick good	0	7
1	9:13	1	29	0:07	Colorado State	Trey McBride 29-yard touchdown reception from Patrick O'Brien, Robert Liss kick good	0	14
2	11:58	10	61	3:40	Colorado State	29-yard field goal by Robert Liss	0	17
2	8:57	6	81	2:56	Wyoming	Trey Smith 13-yard touchdown run, John Hoyland kick good	7	17
2	5:38	9	75	3:19	Colorado State	Patrick O'Brien 1-yard touchdown run, Robert Liss kick good	7	24
2	2:34	6	75	3:04	Wyoming	Xazavian Valladay 2-yard touchdown run, John Hoyland kick good	14	24
3	4:24	11	80	6:02	Wyoming	25-yard field goal by John Hoyland	17	24
3	3:18	4	53	0:59	Colorado State	Trey McBride 38-yard touchdown reception from Patrick O'Brien, Robert Liss kick good	17	31
4	8:18	8	56	3:22	Wyoming	Levi Williams 3-yard touchdown run, John Hoyland kick good	24	31
4	2:46	11	46	5:32	Colorado State	48-yard field goal by Robert Liss	24	34
"TOP" = time of possession. For other American football terms, see Glossary of American football.							24	34

- Passing leaders: Levi Williams (WYO): 19–31, 321 YDS, 1 INT; Patrick O'Brien (CSU): 18–26, 255 YDS, 2 TD
- Rushing leaders: Xazavian Valladay (WYO): 28 CAR, 147 YDS, 1 TD; A'Jon Vivens (CSU): 14 CAR, 62 YDS
- Receiving leaders: Ayden Eberhardt (WYO): 7 REC, 132 YDS; Dante Wright (CSU): 10 REC, 146 YDS

=== At UNLV ===
	1	2	3	4	Total
Cowboys	10	7	21	7	45
Rebels	0	7	0	7	14

Scoring summary

Quarter	Time	Drive			Team	Scoring information	Score	
Quarter	Time	Plays	Yards	TOP	Team	Scoring information	WYO	UNLV
1	14:02	2	75	0:58	Wyoming	Xazavian Valladay 78-yard touchdown run, John Hoyland kick good	7	0
1	6:52	14	54	5:51	Wyoming	36-yard field goal by John Hoyland	10	0
2	8:00	9	75	4:15	Wyoming	Levi Williams 15-yard touchdown run, John Hoyland kick good	17	0
2	0:05	10	98	2:52	UNLV	Max Gilliam 2-yard touchdown run, Daniel Gutierrez kick good	17	7
3	8:27	9	47	4:43	Wyoming	Levi Williams 1-yard touchdown run, John Hoyland kick good	24	7
3	5:27	5	31	2:04	Wyoming	Levi Williams 1-yard touchdown run, John Hoyland kick good	31	7
3	1:19	5	56	2:14	Wyoming	Trey Smith 28-yard touchdown run, John Hoyland kick good	38	7
4	7:37	8	79	3:55	Wyoming	Bret Brenton 19-yard touchdown run, John Hoyland kick good	45	7
4	4:20	9	75	3:17	UNLV	Doug Brumfield 8-yard touchdown run, Daniel Gutierrez kick good	45	14
"TOP" = time of possession. For other American football terms, see Glossary of American football.							45	14

- Passing leaders: Levi Williams (WYO): 8–14, 99 YDS; Doug Brumfield (UNLV): 4–8, 93 YDS
- Rushing leaders: Trey Smith (WYO): 24 CAR, 164 YDS, 1 TD; Max Gilliam (UNLV): 12 CAR, 63 YDS, 1 TD
- Receiving leaders: Ayden Eberhardt (WYO): 3 REC, 42 YDS; Kyle Williams (UNLV): 4 REC, 71 YDS

=== At New Mexico ===
	1	2	3	4	Total
Cowboys	3	10	0	3	16
Lobos	0	10	0	7	17

Scoring summary

Quarter	Time	Drive			Team	Scoring information	Score	
Quarter	Time	Plays	Yards	TOP	Team	Scoring information	WYO	UNM
1	11:42	4	3	0:55	Wyoming	29-yard field goal by John Hoyland	3	0
2	14:53	9	59	4:39	New Mexico	Nathaniel Jones 21-yard touchdown run, Donovan Murphree kick good	3	7
2	8:56	2	74	0:58	Wyoming	Trey Smith 58-yard touchdown run, John Hoyland kick good	10	7
2	6:11	5	2	2:35	New Mexico	40-yard field goal by Donovan Murphree	10	10
2	2:31	8	68	3:32	Wyoming	26-yard field goal by John Hoyland	13	10
4	13:08	9	86	3:28	Wyoming	26-yard field goal by John Hoyland	16	10
4	6:22	2	47	0:54	New Mexico	Bobby Cole 44-yard touchdown reception from Isaiah Chavez, Donovan Murphree kick good	16	17
"TOP" = time of possession. For other American football terms, see Glossary of American football.							16	17

- Passing leaders: Levi Williams (WYO): 4–12, 73 YDS, 1 INT; Isaiah Chavez (UNM): 5–10, 55 YDS, 1 TD
- Rushing leaders: Trey Smith (WYO): 24 CAR, 154 YDS, 1 TD; Bobby Cole (UNM): 22 CAR, 131 YDS
- Receiving leaders: Isaiah Neyor (WYO): 1 REC, 54 YDS; Bobby Cole (UNM): 2 REC, 53 YDS

=== Boise State ===
	1	2	3	4	Total
Broncos	7	3	7	0	17
Cowboys	3	0	3	3	9

Scoring summary

Quarter	Time	Drive			Team	Scoring information	Score	
Quarter	Time	Plays	Yards	TOP	Team	Scoring information	BSU	WYO
1	11:03	5	9	2:38	Wyoming	42-yard field goal by John Hoyland	0	3
1	4:41	12	75	6:22	Boise State	George Holani 4-yard touchdown reception from Hank Bachmeier, Jonah Dalmas kick good	7	3
2	7:38	8	45	2:58	Boise State	34-yard field goal by Jonah Dalmas	10	3
3	6:19	5	35	1:53	Wyoming	36-yard field goal by John Hoyland	10	6
3	0:57	11	75	5:22	Boise State	Andrew Van Buren 2-yard touchdown run, Jonah Dalmas kick good	17	6
4	4:30	13	53	5:09	Wyoming	36-yard field goal by John Hoyland	17	9
"TOP" = time of possession. For other American football terms, see Glossary of American football.							17	9

- Passing leaders: Levi Williams (WYO): 3–13, 45 YDS; Hank Bachmeier (BSU): 19–28, 181 YDS, 1 TD, 1 INT
- Rushing leaders: Xazavian Valladay (WYO): 11 CAR, 59 YDS; Andrew Van Buren (BSU): 25 CAR, 79 YDS, 1 TD
- Receiving leaders: Xazavian Valladay (WYO): 1 REC, 29 YDS; Khalil Shakir (BSU): 8 REC, 105 YDS

== Personnel ==
=== Coaching staff ===
Name	Position	Seasons at Wyoming	Alma mater	Before Wyoming
Craig Bohl	Head coach	7	Nebraska (1982)	North Dakota State – head coach (2013)
Brent Vigen	Associate head coach / offensive coordinator / quarterbacks	7	North Dakota State (1998)	North Dakota State – Offensive coordinator / quarterbacks Coach (2013)
Jay Sawvel	Defensive coordinator / Safeties	1	Mount Union (1993)	Wake Forest – Defensive coordinator / Cornerbacks Coach (2018)
Aaron Bohl	Linebackers	4	Minnesota State–Moorhead (2016)	Wyoming – Graduate assistant (2018)
Benny Boyd	Cornerbacks	1	Aurora (2000)	Eastern Illinois – Cornerbacks Coach / Special Teams Coach (2019)
Marty English	Defensive ends	1	Northern Colorado (1986)	Northern Colorado – Associate head coach / defensive coordinator / linebackers coach (2019)
AJ Blazek	Offensive line	1	Iowa (2002)	North Dakota State – Offensive line (2019)
Mike Grant	Wide receivers	5	Nebraska (1993)	North Texas – Wide receivers coach / receiving coordinator (2014)
Gordie Haug	Running Backs / Director of player personnel	7	Bemidji State (2009)	North Dakota State – Running backs coach (2013)
Pete Kaligis	Defensive run game coordinator / Defensive tackles / Nose Tackles	12	Washington (1994)	Montana – Offensive line coach (2008)
Bart Miller	Run-Game Coordinator / Offensive Line	2	New Mexico (1997)	Ohio – Offensive line coach (2018)
Shannon Moore	Special teams coordinator / tight ends / Fullbacks	2	Black Hills State (2000)	East Carolina – Tight ends coach / recruiting coordinator (2018)
Eric Donoval	Director of Sports Performance / Head Football Strength and Conditioning	3	Wisconsin–La Crosse (2010)	LSU – Assistant Strength and Conditioning Coach (2017)

=== Roster ===
2020 Wyoming Cowboys football team roster
Quarterback: 3 Gavin Beerup – freshman (6'5", 190); 12 Sean Chambers (C) – (redshirt) sophomore (6'3", 225); 15 Levi Williams – (redshirt) freshman (6'5", 221); 20 Ryan Marquez – (redshirt) sophomore (6'1", 189); Tailback: 6 Xazavian Valladay – (redshirt) junior (6'0", 196); 7 Trey Smith – graduate (6'0", 218); 21 Jeremy Hollingsworth – (redshirt) freshman (5'9", 205); 22 Joseph Braasch – freshman (6'1", 205); 23 Alphonzo Andrews Jr. – (redshirt) freshman (5'10", 185); 24 Brett Brenton – (redshirt) sophomore (5'10", 199); 30 Dawaiin McNeely – (redshirt) freshman (6'2", 203); Fullback: 32 Jahmari Moore – (redshirt) senior (6'2", 236); 34 Jeff Burroughs – (redshirt) senior (6'1", 233); 35 Skyler Miller – (redshirt) senior (5'11", 234); 36 Caleb Driskill – freshman (6'2", 215); Wide receiver: 4 Devin Jennings – (redshirt) freshman (6'2", 189); 5 Isaiah Neyor – (redshirt) freshman (6'3", 210); 8 Dontae Crow – (redshirt) senior (5'9", 178); 9 Alex Brown – (redshirt) freshman (6'4", 205); 11 Wyatt Wieland – (redshirt) sophomore (6'1", 186); 14 Tyrese Grant – freshman (6'0", 160); 16 Gunner Gentry – junior (6'3", 208); 18 Joshua Cobbs – freshman (6'4", 205); 19 Ayden Eberhardt – (redshirt) senior (6'2", 195); 29 Chris Ndushabandi – (redshirt) freshman (6'0", 173); 85 Mason Gallegos – (redshirt) sophomore (6'2", 168); 87 Chance Hofer – (redshirt) sophomore (6'0", 196); 88 Max Mazurie – freshman (5'10", 177); Tight end: 80 Parker Christensen – (redshirt) freshman (6'2", 225); 81 Treyton Welch – sophomore (6'3", 230); 82 Jackson Marcotte – (redshirt) sophomore (6'7", 257); 84 Nate Weinman – (redshirt) junior (6'7", 267); 86 Nick Miles – freshman (6'5", 250); 87 Colin O'Brien – sophomore (6'6", 235)	Offensive lineman: 50 Jack Lookabaugh – (redshirt) freshman (6'5", 302); 53 Mana Taimani – freshman (6'5", 315); 55 Gavin Rush – (redshirt) junior (6'3", 312); 58 Latrell Bible – (redshirt) freshman (6'4", 290); 60 Marco Machado – (redshirt) sophomore (6'4", 312); 62 Rudy Stofer – (redshirt) junior (6'6", 300); 64 Kohl Herbolsheimer – freshman (6'3", 275); 65 Zach Watts – (redshirt) sophomore (6'5", 302); 66 Connor Shopp – (redshirt) freshman (6'6", 263); 68 Mason Schultz – (redshirt) freshman (6'4", 265); 69 Eric Abojei – (redshirt) junior (6'5", 350); 70 Malik Williams – freshman (6'4", 265); 71 Carlos Harrison – (redshirt) freshman (6'4", 278); 73 Keegan Cryder (C) – (redshirt) junior (6'4", 309); 74 Blayne Baker – (redshirt) sophomore (6'5", 305); 75 Frank Crum – (redshirt) sophomore (6'7", 314); 76 Emmanuel Pregnon – freshman (6'6", 265); 77 Nofoafia Tulafono – freshman (6'2", 311); 78 Alonzo Velazquez (injured) – senior (6'6", 302); 79 Logan Harris (injured) – senior (6'3", 310); Defensive lineman: 29 Leevi Lafaele – (redshirt) sophomore (6'2", 224); 44 Victor Jones – (redshirt) junior (6'4", 245); 49 Teagan Liufau – (redshirt) sophomore (6'3", 232); 52 Jack Boyer – (redshirt) sophomore (6'4", 220); 54 Sabastian Harsh – freshman (6'3", 220); 59 Oluwaseyi Omotosho – freshman (6'2", 225); 63 Jason Davis – (redshirt) junior (6'3", 336); 76 Justis Borton – senior (6'2", 282); 85 Cameron Smith – freshman (6'4", 230); 86 Braden Siders – freshman (6'3", 215); 87 Akili Bonner – (redshirt) freshman (6'4", 237); 88 Garrett Crall (C) – senior (6'5", 233); 90 Gavin Meyer – freshman (6'4", 240); 91 Jaylen Pate – (redshirt) freshman (6'3", 241); 92 Alonzo Hall – (redshirt) freshman (6'5", 240); 93 DeVonne Harris – (redshirt) freshman (6'4", 217); 94 Cole Godbout – (redshirt) sophomore (6'4", 274); 95 Caleb Robinson – freshman (6'2", 265); 96 Jordan Bertagnole – (redshirt) freshman (6'4", 254); 98 Ravontae Holt – (redshirt) junior (6'4", 287)	Linebackers: 7 Keonte Glinton – (redshirt) freshman (5'10", 175); 18 Keyon Blankenbaker – (redshirt) junior (5'10", 175); 24 Blake Harrington – (redshirt) sophomore (5'11", 180); 28 Easton Gibbs – (redshirt) freshman (6'2", 216); 31 Wyett Ekeler – freshman (5'11", 189); 33 Charles Hicks – (redshirt) sophomore (6'3", 228); 36 Brennan Kutterer – (redshirt) junior (6'1", 211); 38 Ray Rabou – (redshirt) sophomore (6'2", 212); 43 Shae Suiaunoa – (redshirt) freshman (6'3", 227); 45 Read Sunn – freshman (6'2", 226); 47 Brent VanderVeen – freshman (6'2", 190); 48 Chad Muma (C) – junior (6'3", 227); 53 Connor Shay – freshman (6'2", 210); Defensive backs: 2 Cameron Murray – (redshirt) sophomore (6'1", 175); 4 Caleb Roberson – (redshirt) freshman (5'11", 181); 5 Esaias Gandy – senior (6'1", 198); 9 Keshaun Taylor – freshman (6'0", 195); 11 Xavier Carter – freshman (6'0", 175); 12 Cameron Stone – freshman (5'10", 175); 14 Miles Williams – junior (6'1", 194); 20 Azizi Hearn – junior (6'1", 193); 21 C.J. Coldon – (redshirt) junior (6'1", 178); 26 Braden Smith – (redshirt) senior (5'10", 186); 40 Taylor Dodd – (redshirt) junior (6'2", 205); 42 Isaac White – freshman (6'1", 195); Placekicker/Punter: 17 Nick Null – graduate (5'11", 175); 42 Luke Glassrock – (redshirt) freshman (5'10", 181); 46 John Hoyland (W) – freshman (5'10", 183); Longsnapper: 99 Jesse Hooper – junior (5'11", 204); COVID-19 Opt-Outs: 2 Titus Swen – sophomore (5'11", 198); 8 Rome Weber – (redshirt) sophomore (5'11", 188); 41 Davon Wells-Ross – (redshirt) junior (6'5", 214); 51 Solomon Byrd – (redshirt) sophomore (6'4", 247); 55 Claude Cole – (redshirt) sophomore (6'4", 266); 97 Mario Mora – (redshirt) sophomore (6'3", 275); Legend: (C) Team captain; (S) Suspended; (I) Ineligible; Injured; Redshirt

=== 2020 recruiting class ===
The Cowboys announced an early signing class of 18 high school student athletes on December 18, 2019. A day later, the Cowboys added tackle Emmanuel Pregnon. On February 5, 2020, the Cowboys added five more recruits.

College recruiting
Name	Hometown	School	Height	Weight	Commit date
Nick Null; P/K	Bradenton, FL	Cornell	5 ft 11 in (1.80 m)	175 lb (79 kg)	Feb 5, 2020
Nick Null; P/K	Recruit ratings: Scout: Rivals: 247Sports: ESPN:				
Xavier Carter; CB	Manvel, TX	Manvel HS	6 ft 0 in (1.83 m)	175 lb (79 kg)	Feb 5, 2020
Xavier Carter; CB	Recruit ratings: Scout: Rivals: 247Sports: ESPN:				
Connor Shay; LB	Danville, CA	Monte Vista HS	6 ft 2 in (1.88 m)	210 lb (95 kg)	Feb 1, 2020
Connor Shay; LB	Recruit ratings: Scout: Rivals: 247Sports: ESPN:				
Tyrese Grant; WR	Daingerfield, TX	Daingerfield HS	6 ft 0 in (1.83 m)	170 lb (77 kg)	Jan 26, 2020
Tyrese Grant; WR	Recruit ratings: Scout: Rivals: 247Sports: ESPN:				
Colin O'Brien; TE	Mission Viejo, CA	Saddleback College	6 ft 5 in (1.96 m)	230 lb (100 kg)	Jan 24, 2020
Colin O'Brien; TE	Recruit ratings: Scout: Rivals: 247Sports: ESPN:				
Joshua Cobbs; WR	San Antonio, TX	Karen Wagner HS	6 ft 4 in (1.93 m)	200 lb (91 kg)	Jan 23, 2020
Joshua Cobbs; WR	Recruit ratings: Scout: Rivals: 247Sports: ESPN:				
Emmanuel Pregnon; OT	Denver, CO	Thomas Jefferson HS	6 ft 6 in (1.98 m)	265 lb (120 kg)	Dec 19, 2019
Emmanuel Pregnon; OT	Recruit ratings: Scout: Rivals: 247Sports: ESPN:				
Keshaun Taylor; S	Denver, CO	Thomas Jefferson HS	6 ft 0 in (1.83 m)	195 lb (88 kg)	Dec 18, 2019
Keshaun Taylor; S	Recruit ratings: Scout: Rivals: 247Sports: ESPN:				
Brent VanderVeen; LB	Sedro-Woolley, WA	Sedro-Woolley HS	6 ft 2 in (1.88 m)	190 lb (86 kg)	Dec 18, 2019
Brent VanderVeen; LB	Recruit ratings: Scout: Rivals: 247Sports: ESPN:				
Nofoafia Tulafono; OL	Hesperia, CA	Oak Hills HS	6 ft 1 in (1.85 m)	305 lb (138 kg)	Sep 30, 2019
Nofoafia Tulafono; OL	Recruit ratings: Scout: Rivals: 247Sports: ESPN:				
Gavin Beerup; QB	Ventura, CA	St. Bonaventure HS	6 ft 4 in (1.93 m)	190 lb (86 kg)	Jul 26, 2019
Gavin Beerup; QB	Recruit ratings: Scout: Rivals: 247Sports: ESPN:				
Mana Taimani; OL	Concord, CA	Clayton Valley Charter HS	6 ft 5 in (1.96 m)	306 lb (139 kg)	Dec 17, 2019
Mana Taimani; OL	Recruit ratings: Scout: Rivals: 247Sports: ESPN:				
Malik Williams; OL	Hayward, CA	Hayward HS	6 ft 4 in (1.93 m)	265 lb (120 kg)	Oct 23, 2019
Malik Williams; OL	Recruit ratings: Scout: Rivals: 247Sports: ESPN:				
Gavin Meyer; DE	Franklin, WI	Franklin HS	6 ft 4 in (1.93 m)	240 lb (110 kg)	Dec 10, 2019
Gavin Meyer; DE	Recruit ratings: Scout: Rivals: 247Sports: ESPN:				
Braden Siders; DE	Arvada, CO	Ralston Valley HS	6 ft 2 in (1.88 m)	212 lb (96 kg)	Apr 7, 2019
Braden Siders; DE	Recruit ratings: Scout: Rivals: 247Sports: ESPN:				
Oluwaseyi Omotosho; DE	Richmond, TX	Fort Bend Bush HS	6 ft 2 in (1.88 m)	210 lb (95 kg)	Dec 18, 2019
Oluwaseyi Omotosho; DE	Recruit ratings: Scout: Rivals: 247Sports: ESPN:				
Caleb Driskill; FB	Gillette, WY	Thunder Basin HS	6 ft 2 in (1.88 m)	215 lb (98 kg)	Oct 29, 2019
Caleb Driskill; FB	Recruit ratings: Scout: Rivals: 247Sports: ESPN:				
Wyett Ekeler; DB	Windsor, CO	Windsor HS	6 ft 0 in (1.83 m)	200 lb (91 kg)	Dec 18, 2019
Wyett Ekeler; DB	Recruit ratings: Scout: Rivals: 247Sports: ESPN:				
Cameron Smith; DE	Parker, CO	Legend HS	6 ft 5 in (1.96 m)	230 lb (100 kg)	Jun 12, 2019
Cameron Smith; DE	Recruit ratings: Scout: Rivals: 247Sports: ESPN:				
Nick Miles; TE	Parker, CO	Chaparral HS	6 ft 5 in (1.96 m)	225 lb (102 kg)	Jun 23, 2019
Nick Miles; TE	Recruit ratings: Scout: Rivals: 247Sports: ESPN:				
Cameron Stone; CB	Angleton, TX	Angleton HS	5 ft 10 in (1.78 m)	175 lb (79 kg)	Dec 3, 2019
Cameron Stone; CB	Recruit ratings: Scout: Rivals: 247Sports: ESPN:				
Joey Braasch; RB	Columbus, NE	Columbus HS	6 ft 0 in (1.83 m)	195 lb (88 kg)	Oct 13, 2019
Joey Braasch; RB	Recruit ratings: Scout: Rivals: 247Sports: ESPN:				
Caleb Robinson; DT	Omaha, NE	Burke HS	6 ft 2 in (1.88 m)	270 lb (120 kg)	Nov 26, 2019
Caleb Robinson; DT	Recruit ratings: Scout: Rivals: 247Sports: ESPN:				
Kohl Herbolsheimer; OL	Omaha, NE	Millard South HS	6 ft 3 in (1.91 m)	275 lb (125 kg)	Sep 18, 2019
Kohl Herbolsheimer; OL	Recruit ratings: Scout: Rivals: 247Sports: ESPN:				
Isaac White; S	Denver, CO	Malvern Prep	6 ft 0 in (1.83 m)	195 lb (88 kg)	Sep 3, 2019
Isaac White; S	Recruit ratings: Scout: Rivals: 247Sports: ESPN:				
Overall recruit ranking: Scout: 115 Rivals: 99 247Sports: 115 ESPN: –
Note: In many cases, Scout, Rivals, 247Sports, On3, and ESPN may conflict in their listings of height and weight.; In these cases, the average was taken. ESPN grades are on a 100-point scale.; Sources: "2020 Team Ranking". Rivals.com.

== Awards and honors ==
=== All-conference ===
All-Mountain West teams were announced on December 15, 2020.

Position	Player	Class
First Team Offense
RB	Xazavian Valladay	JR
OL	Keegan Cryder	JR
First Team Defense
LB	Chad Muma	JR

Position	Player	Class
Second Team Offense
PK	John Hoyland	FR

Honorable Mentions

- Esaias Gandy Sr., DB
- Logan Harris Sr., OL
- Isaiah Neyor, Fr., WR

== Statistics ==
=== Team ===
Team Statistics
	Wyoming	Opponents
Points	159	126
First Downs	111	107
Rushing	68	48
Passing	36	49
Penalty	7	10
Rushing Yards	1317	752
Rushing Attempts	275	221
Average Per Rush	4.8	3.4
Long	78	36
Rushing TDs	16	7
Passing Yards	920	1215
Comp–Att	62–134	113–178
Comp %	46.3%	63.5%
Average Per Game	153.3	202.7
Average per Attempt	6.9	6.8
Passing TDs	1	8
INT's	5	4
Touchdowns	17	16
Passing	1	8
Rushing	16	7
Defensive	0	1
Interceptions	4	5
Yards	60	35
Total Offense	2237	1968
Total Plays	409	399
Average Yards/Game	372.8	328.0
Kick Returns: # – Yards	15–290	17–407
TDs	0	0
Long	40	72
Punts	30	34
Yards	1122	1491
Average	37.4	43.9
Punt Returns: # – Yards	12–66	9–64
TDs	0	0
Long	15	27
Fumbles – Fumbles Lost	6–4	8–6
Penalties – Yards	31–279	37–311
3rd–Down Conversions	27/89 (30.3%)	29/80 (36.3%)
4th–Down Conversions	6/12 (50.0%)	0/6 (0.0%)
Field Goals	13–14	5–7
Sacks	17	16
Yards	109	101

=== Offense ===
Passing Statistics
NAME	GP	CMP	ATT	YDS	CMP%	TD	INT	RAT
Levi Williams	6	59	119	877	49.6%	1	3	109.22
Gavin Beerup	2	2	13	37	15.4%	0	2	8.52
Sean Chambers	1	1	1	6	100.0%	0	0	150.40
Team	4	0	1	0	0.0%	0	0	0.00
TOTALS	6	62	134	920	46.3%	1	5	98.94

Rushing Statistics
NAME	GP	CAR	YDS	AVG	LONG	TD
Xazavian Valladay	5	99	550	5.6	78	4
Trey Smith	6	88	488	5.5	58	5
Levi Williams	6	56	100	1.8	21	6
Isaiah Neyor	6	1	58	58.0	58	0
Dawaiian McNeely	5	14	55	3.9	14	0
Brett Brenton	5	3	41	13.7	19	1
Gavin Beerup	2	5	27	5.4	38	0
Devin Jennings	6	2	5	5.0	4	0
Parker Christensen	6	1	5	5.0	5	0
Ayden Eberhardt	6	1	1	1.0	1	0
Sean Chambers	1	1	-2	-2.0	0	0
Team	4	4	−11	-2.8	0	0
TOTALS	6	275	1317	4.8	78	16

Receiving Statistics
NAME	GP	REC	YDS	AVG	LONG	TD
Ayden Eberhardt	6	16	252	15.8	56	0
Xazavian Valladay	5	13	105	8.1	29	0
Isaiah Neyor	6	8	248	31.0	54	0
Dontae Crow	6	7	78	11.1	25	0
Treyton Welch	6	5	95	19.0	30	0
Nate Weinman	6	4	49	12.2	15	0
Trey Smith	6	3	18	6.0	8	0
Parker Christensen	6	2	28	14.0	21	0
Gunner Gentry	3	2	28	14.0	22	1
Jackson Marcotte	5	1	12	12.0	12	0
Devin Jennings	6	1	7	7.0	7	0
TOTALS	6	62	920	14.8	56	1

=== Defense ===
Defensive Statistics
#	NAME	GP	SOLO	AST	TOT	TFL-YDS	SACKS	INT	BU	QBH	FR	FF	BLK	SAF
48	Chad Muma	6	33	39	72	8.0–36	3.0–25	0	1	0	1	1	0	0
5	Esaias Gandy	6	23	22	45	4.5–25	1.0–9	0	0	0	0	0	0	0
28	Easton Gibbs	6	21	21	42	2.5–6	0.0–0	0	0	0	0	0	0	0
96	Jordan Bertagnole	6	10	21	31	6.5–24	2.5–16	0	0	1	1	0	0	0
94	Cole Godbout	5	13	17	30	4.0–15	1.0–9	0	1	0	0	0	0	0
33	Charles Hicks	5	8	19	27	3.5–12	2.0–9	1–47	0	0	2	0	0	0
21	C.J. Coldon	6	17	9	26	1.0–2	0.0–0	2–1	3	0	0	0	0	0
26	Braden Smith	6	16	7	23	2.0–12	1.0–4	1–12	0	1	0	0	0	0
88	Garrett Crall	3	11	10	21	3.0–22	2.0–13	0	1	0	0	0	0	0
6	Keonte Glinton	6	10	6	16	1.5–3	0.0–0	0	1	0	0	0	0	0
44	Victor Jones	3	4	9	13	3.0–20	1.5–15	0	1	1	0	0	0	0
20	Azizi Hearn	6	9	4	13	0.0–0	0.0–0	0	4	0	0	0	0	0
93	DeVonne Harris	5	5	4	9	1.0–1	0.0–0	0	0	0	0	0	0	0
43	Shae Suiaunoa	6	2	6	8	0.0–0	0.0–0	0	0	0	0	0	0	0
18	Keyon Blankenbaker	4	6	2	8	0.0–0	0.0–0	0	2	0	0	0	0	0
8	Cameron Smith	4	4	4	8	3.0–9	2.0–7	0	0	0	1	1	0	0
14	Miles Williams	6	4	4	8	0.0–0	0.0–0	0	0	0	0	0	0	0
91	Jaylen Pate	6	5	2	7	1.0–2	1.0–2	0	0	0	0	0	0	0
2	Cameron Murray	5	4	2	6	0.0–0	0.0–0	0	0	0	0	0	0	0
98	Ravontae Holt	2	1	3	4	0.5–3	0.0–0	0	0	0	0	0	0	0
80	Parker Christensen	6	1	2	3	0.0–0	0.0–0	0	0	0	0	0	0	0
30	Dawaiian McNeely	5	2	1	3	0.0–0	0.0–0	0	0	0	0	0	0	0
95	Caleb Robinson	2	1	2	3	0.5–1	0.0–0	0	0	0	0	0	0	0
1	Cameron Stone	5	2	0	2	0.0–0	0.0–0	0	0	0	0	0	0	0
90	Gavin Meyer	3	1	1	2	0.0–0	0.0–0	0	0	0	0	0	0	0
24	Brett Brenton	5	1	1	2	0.0–0	0.0–0	0	0	0	1	0	0	0
19	Ayden Eberhardt	6	1	1	2	0.0–0	0.0–0	0	0	0	0	0	0	0
25	Blake Harrington	3	1	0	1	0.0–0	0.0–0	0	0	0	0	0	0	0
61	Jason Davis	6	0	1	1	0.0–0	0.0–0	0	0	0	0	0	0	0
11	Xavier Carter	1	1	0	1	0.0–0	0.0–0	0	0	0	0	0	0	0
76	Justis Borton	6	0	1	1	0.0–0	0.0–0	0	0	0	0	0	0	0
4	Issac White	1	0	1	1	0.5–1	0.0–0	0	0	0	0	0	0	0
5	Isaiah Neyor	6	1	0	1	0.0–0	0.0–0	0	0	0	0	0	0	0
36	Brennan Kutterer	3	0	1	1	0.0–0	0.0–0	0	0	0	0	0	0	0
31	Wyett Ekeler	2	1	0	1	0.0–0	0.0–0	0	0	0	0	0	0	0
TM	Team	4	0	0	0	0.0–0	0.0–0	0	1	0	0	0	0	0
	TOTAL	6	217	224	441	46–194	17–109	4–60	14	4	6	2	0	0
	OPPONENTS	6	222	236	458	37–156	16–101	5–35	12	7	4	5	1	0

Key: SOLO: Solo Tackles, AST: Assisted Tackles, TOT: Total Tackles, TFL: Tackles-for-loss, SACK: Quarterback Sacks, INT: Interceptions, BU: Passes Broken Up, QBH: Quarterback Hits, FF: Forced Fumbles, FR: Fumbles Recovered, BLK: Kicks or Punts Blocked, SAF: Safeties

Interceptions Statistics
NAME	NO.	YDS	AVG	TD	LNG
C.J. Coldon	2	1	0.5	0	1
Braden Smith	1	12	12.0	0	12
Charles Hicks	1	47	47.0	0	47
TOTALS	4	60	15.0	0	47

=== Special teams ===
Kicking statistics
NAME	XPM	XPA	XP%	FGM	FGA	FG%	1–19	20–29	30–39	40–49	50+	LNG	PTS
John Hoyland	16	16	100.0%	13	14	92.9%	0–0	5–5	6–7	2–2	0–0	42	55
TOTALS	16	16	100.0%	13	14	92.9%	0–0	5–5	6–7	2–2	0–0	42	55

Kick return statistics
NAME	RTNS	YDS	AVG	TD	LNG
Dontae Crow	13	285	21.9	0	40
Jahmari Moore	1	1	1.0	0	1
Jeff Burroughs	1	4	4.0	0	4
TOTALS	15	290	19.3	0	40

Punting statistics
NAME	PUNTS	YDS	AVG	LONG	TB	FC	I–20	50+	BLK
Nick Null	29	1122	38.7	51	1	8	6	1	1
TEAM	1	0	0.0	0	0	0	0	0	0
TOTALS	30	1122	37.4	51	1	8	6	1	1

Punt return statistics
NAME	RTNS	YDS	AVG	TD	LONG
Dontae Crow	10	57	5.7	0	15
Ayden Eberhardt	2	9	4.5	0	6
TOTALS	12	66	5.5	0	15
