= A. J. Cooper (disambiguation) =

A. J. Cooper is an American football coach.

A. J. Cooper may also refer to:

- Anna J. Cooper (1858–1964), American author, educator, sociologist
- A. J. Cooper, a fictional casino owner in Las Vegas (TV series)#A.J. Cooper (season 5)
