= Xazavian Valladay =

American football player (born 1999)

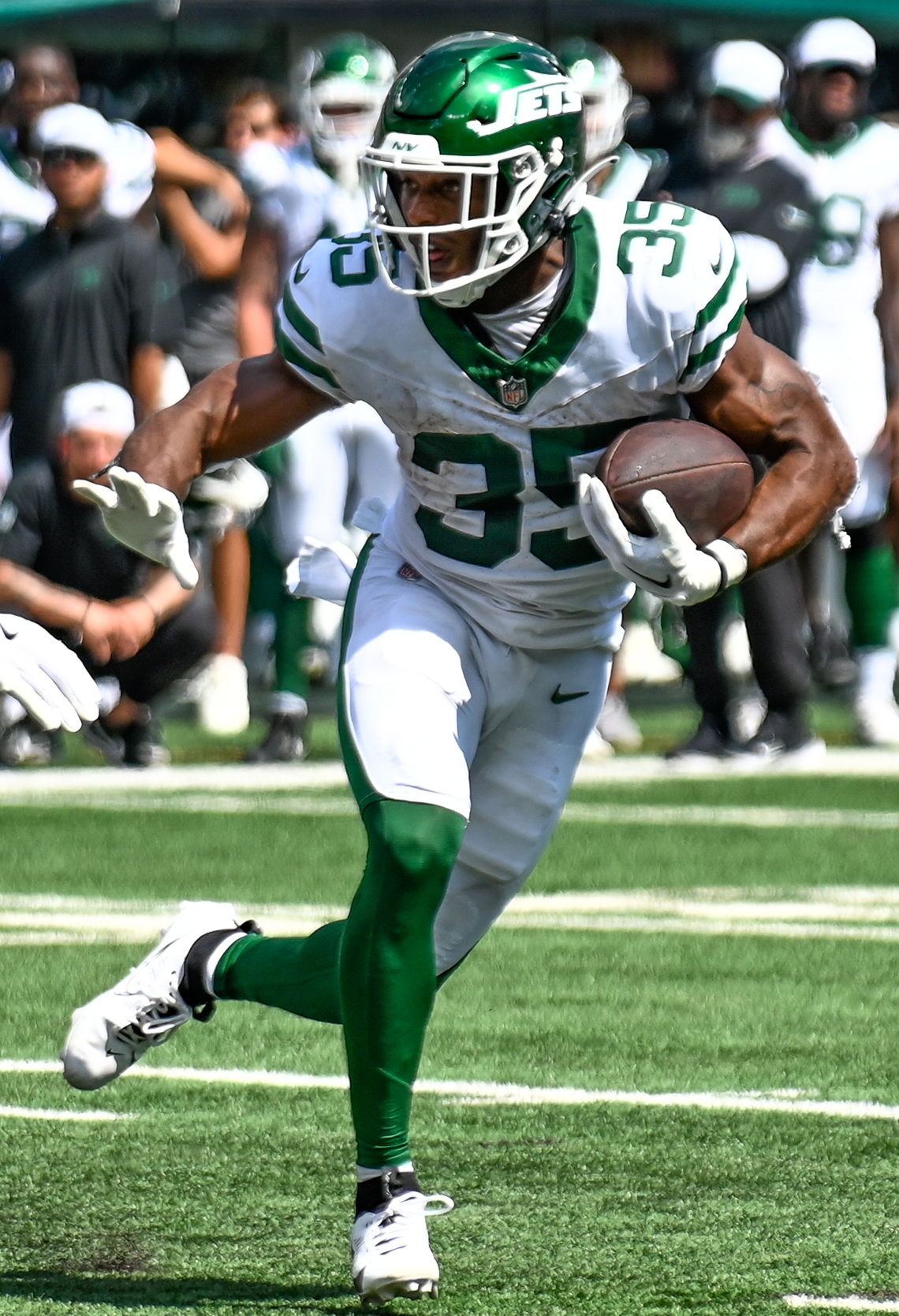
- Valladay with the New York Jets in 2024

No. 24 – DC Defenders
- Position: Running back
- Roster status: Active

Personal information
- Born: July 3, 1999 (age 27); Matteson, Illinois, U.S.
- Listed height: 5 ft 11 in (1.80 m)
- Listed weight: 204 lb (93 kg)

Career information
- High school: Brother Rice (Chicago, Illinois)
- College: Wyoming (2017–2021); Arizona State (2022)
- NFL draft: 2023: undrafted

Career history
- Houston Texans (2023)*; Pittsburgh Steelers (2023)*; New York Jets (2023–2024); New Orleans Saints (2024)*; Minnesota Vikings (2025)*; DC Defenders (2026–present)
- * Offseason or practice squad member only

Awards and highlights
- 2× First-team All-MW (2019, 2020); Second-team All-MW (2021); Second-team All-Pac-12 (2022)

Career NFL statistics as of 2025
- Games played: 1
- Stats at Pro Football Reference

Xazavian Valladay (born July 3, 1999) is an American professional football running back for the DC Defenders of the United Football League (UFL). He played college football for the Wyoming Cowboys and Arizona State Sun Devils.

== Early life ==
Valladay's hometown is Matteson, Illinois and he attended Brother Rice High School. In his high school career, Valladay helped his high school to 9–3 record and to the 2016 Illinois Class 8A State Playoffs as the number eight seed. Valladay would decide to commit to play college football at the University of Wyoming.

== College career ==
=== Wyoming ===
In Wyoming's 2018 season finale, Valladay had a breakout game as he rushed for 192 yards and two touchdowns, as he helped the Cowboys beat New Mexico to become bowl eligible. Valladay finished the 2018 season with 396 yards and three touchdowns on 71 carries, while also hauling in four passes for 35 yards. In the 2019 Arizona Bowl, Valladay had a monster game rushing for 204 yards and a touchdown, while also bringing in three passes for 91 yards and a score, as he helped Wyoming beat Georgia State to win their bowl game. For his performance on the game he was named the Offensive MVP for the game. Valladay finished his breakout 2019 season with 1,265 yards and six touchdowns on 247 carries, while also notching 11 receptions for 211 yards and two touchdowns. For his performance on the season he was named to the 2019 First Team All Mountain-West football team. In week two of the 2020 season, Valladay had an amazing performance rushing for 163 yards and two touchdowns, while also catching two passes for 32 yards, as he helped the Cowboys beat Hawaii 31–7. Valladay finished the shortened 2020 season with 550 yards and four touchdowns on 99 carries, while also hauling in 13 receptions for 105 yards. For his performance on the year, Valladay was named First Team All Mountain West for the second straight season. In week nine of the 2021 season, Valladay had another great performance rushing for 172 yards, but Wyoming would fall to San Jose State 27–21. Valladay finished the 2021 season with 1,063 yards and six touchdowns on 209 carries, while also racking up 23 receptions for 233 yards. For his performance on the season, Valladay would be named Second Team All Mountain West. After the conclusion of the 2021 season, Valladay announced that he had decided to enter the NCAA transfer portal and continue out his career elsewhere.

=== Arizona State ===
Valladay would decide to transfer to Arizona State to play out his final season of eligibility. Valladay had a stellar debut with Arizona State in week one of the 2022 season, as he rushed for 116 yards and two touchdowns, as helped the Sun Devils beat Northern Arizona. In week nine, Valladay had another great performance rushing for 118 yards and three touchdowns, as he helped Arizona State take down Colorado. Valladay finished the season with 1,192 yards and 16 touchdowns on 215 carries, while also bringing in 37 receptions for 289 yards and two touchdowns. For his performance on the season, Valladay was named second team all Pac-12.

Valladay finished his college career with 4,466 rushing yards and 35 touchdowns on 841 carries, while also notching 88 receptions for 873 yards and four touchdowns.

== Professional career ==
Pre-draft measurables
Height	Weight	Arm length	Hand span	Wingspan	40-yard dash	10-yard split	20-yard split	20-yard shuttle	Three-cone drill	Vertical jump	Broad jump	Bench press
5 ft 11 1/4 in (1.81 m)	204 lb (93 kg)	30 3/4 in (0.78 m)	8 1/2 in (0.22 m)	6 ft 4 1/8 in (1.93 m)	4.46 s	1.56 s	2.59 s	4.32 s	7.00 s	40.0 in (1.02 m)	10 ft 3 in (3.12 m)	22 reps
All values from Pro Day

=== Houston Texans ===
After not being selected in the 2023 NFL draft, Valladay signed with the Houston Texans as an undrafted free agent. On August 13, 2023, Valladay was released by the Texans.

=== Pittsburgh Steelers ===
On August 15, 2023, Valladay signed with the Pittsburgh Steelers. On August 29, Valladay was released by the Steelers during final rosters cuts.

=== New York Jets ===
On August 30, 2023, Valladay signed to the New York Jets practice squad. He was promoted to the active roster on January 6, 2024.

On August 27, 2024, Valladay was waived by the Jets and re-signed to the practice squad. He was released on September 11.

=== New Orleans Saints ===
On November 6, 2024, Valladay was signed to the New Orleans Saints practice squad. He signed a reserve/future contract with New Orleans on January 6, 2025. On June 20, Valladay was waived by the Saints.

=== Minnesota Vikings ===
On August 19, 2025, Valladay signed with the Minnesota Vikings. He was waived on August 26 as part of final roster cuts. He was signed to the practice squad the next day. Valladay was released from the practice squad on September 23.

=== DC Defenders ===
On January 14, 2026, Valladay was selected by the DC Defenders of the United Football League (UFL).

== Career statistics ==
=== College ===
Year	Team	Games		Rushing				Receiving			
Year	Team	GP	GS	Att	Yds	Avg	TD	Rec	Yds	Avg	TD
2017	Wyoming	0	0	Redshirted (redshirt)							
2018	Wyoming	12	2	71	396	5.6	3	4	35	8.8	0
2019	Wyoming	12	9	247	1,265	5.1	6	11	211	19.2	2
2020	Wyoming	5	4	99	550	5.6	4	13	105	8.1	0
2021	Wyoming	13	12	209	1,070	5.1	6	23	233	10.1	0
2022	Arizona State	12	12	215	1,192	5.5	16	37	289	7.8	2
Career		54	39	841	4,473	5.3	35	88	873	9.9	4
