= Levi Williams (American football) =

American football player

No. 16
- Position: Quarterback

Personal information
- Born: Canyon Lake, Texas, U.S.
- Listed height: 6 ft 5 in (1.96 m)
- Listed weight: 230 lb (104 kg)

Career information
- High school: Smithson Valley (Comal County, Texas)
- College: Wyoming (2019–2021); Utah State (2022–2023)
- Stats at ESPN

Levi Williams is an American former college football quarterback. Williams attended Smithson Valley High School, after which he started his collegiate career with the Wyoming Cowboys before transferring to play for the Utah State Aggies.

== Early life ==
Williams attended Smithson Valley High School in Comal County, Texas. In his senior season, Williams threw for 32 touchdowns with 3,239 yards and had 1,230 rushing yards with 16 rushing touchdowns. Williams was a consensus 3-star recruit and according to 247Sports.com he was the 40th best pro style quarterback in the class of 2019. Williams was originally committed to Houston but he decided to play college football at the University of Wyoming over Baylor, Oklahoma State, and TCU.

== College career ==
=== Wyoming ===
Williams played sparingly in his freshman season. He would make his first career start in the Arizona Bowl where he would throw for three touchdowns and he would also have a rushing touchdown in a 38–17 win against Georgia State. In the next season, Williams played in all six games in a shortened season rushing for 6 touchdowns while only having one passing touchdown with three interceptions. Williams would play in eight games the following season. After a three-game losing streak Williams was named the starting quarterback against San Jose State. Wyoming lost 21–27 behind two touchdowns and two interceptions from Williams. He finished the season with 8 passing touchdowns with 5 interceptions and one rushing touchdown. In the Famous Idaho Potato Bowl against Kent State, Williams threw for one touchdown with 127 yards, and he rushed for 200 yards and 4 touchdowns in the 52–38 win. After his performance, Williams was named the game's MVP. On December 22, 2021, just one day after the game, Williams announced his decision to transfer.

=== Utah State ===
On December 30, 2021, Williams announced his decision to transfer to Utah State. After playing as a backup for two seasons, Williams was named the starter against New Mexico in the final regular season game of the 2023 season. In his first start with Utah State, he combined for five total touchdowns, two passing and three rushing, including the game-winning 13-yard touchdown run in overtime, leading Utah State to a 44–41 double-overtime victory. As a result of his performance, Williams was named the Mountain West Offensive Player of the Week. On November 28, 2023, Williams announced that he would be forgoing his final year of college eligibility to pursue his dream of becoming a Navy SEAL. A few weeks later, he was named the starting quarterback for the 2023 Famous Idaho Potato Bowl, his final collegiate game.

=== Statistics ===
Year	Team	Games			Passing								Rushing			
Year	Team	GP	GS	Record	Cmp	Att	Pct	Yds	Avg	TD	Int	Rtg	Att	Yds	Avg	TD
2019	Wyoming	3	1	1−0	19	39	48.7	343	8.8	3	2	137.7	40	181	4.5	2
2020	Wyoming	6	5	2−3	59	119	49.6	877	7.4	1	3	109.2	56	100	1.8	6
2021	Wyoming	9	6	3−3	72	120	60.0	990	8.3	9	5	145.7	72	482	6.7	5
2022	Utah State	6	0	—	5	17	29.4	28	1.6	0	1	31.5	10	51	5.1	0
2023	Utah State	10	2	1−1	35	61	57.4	365	7.0	5	2	136.4	45	209	4.6	3
Career		34	14	7−7	190	356	53.4	2,663	7.5	18	13	125.6	223	1,023	4.6	16
