= A. J. Cooper =

American football coach

Current position
- Title: Linebackers Coach / Defensive Run Game Coordinator
- Team: Arizona State
- Conference: Big 12

Biographical details
- Born: Phoenix, Arizona, U.S.

Playing career
- 2002–2003: Glendale (AZ)
- 2004–2005: North Dakota State
- 2006: Green Bay Packers
- Position: Tight end

Coaching career (HC unless noted)
- 2006–2008: North Dakota State (GA)
- 2009–2012: North Dakota State (DE)
- 2013: North Dakota State (STC/DE)
- 2014–2017: Wyoming (STC/DE)
- 2018: Wyoming (co-STC/DE)
- 2019: Wyoming (co-STC / DE / DRGC)
- 2020: Washington State (DE)
- 2021: Washington State (DL)
- 2022: Washington State (DE/DRGC)
- 2023–present: Arizona State (LB/DRGC)

A. J. Cooper is an American football coach and former tight end. He has been an assistant coach for various college football programs since 2006. He currently is the linebacker coach and defensive run game coordinator for Arizona State.

== Playing career ==
Out of Sunnyslope High School where he played linebacker and tight end, Cooper went to Glendale Community College as a tight end. In 2004 he transferred to North Dakota State University, where he was selected First Team All-Great West Football Conference as a senior. In 2006, he signed as an undrafted free agent with the Green Bay Packers, however he did not make the roster.

== Coaching career ==
=== North Dakota State ===
In 2006, Cooper started his coaching career at his alma mater working as a graduate assistant until 2008. In 2009 he was made the team's defensive ends coach. In 2013 he added the responsibility of being the Bisons’ special teams coordinator.

=== Wyoming ===
In 2014, Cooper went with Craig Bohl to Wyoming where he served as the defensive ends coach and special teams coordinator until the end of the 2019 season. Additionally in 2019 he was the team's defensive run game coordinator.

=== Washington State ===
In 2020 Cooper joined Nick Rolovich’s inaugural staff at Washington State as the defensive ends coach. Amidst the 2021 season, after the firing of multiple coaches who refused to get vaccinated for COVID-19, Cooper also took over responsibility for the entire defensive line adding defensive tackles to his plate. In 2022 he was retained as the team's edges coach and added the title of defensive run game coordinator.

=== Arizona State ===
In December 2022, he was named the linebackers coach and defensive run game coordinator for Arizona State.
