= 2019 Arizona Bowl =

Postseason college football bowl game

2019 Nova Home Loans Arizona Bowl
- 5th Arizona Bowl
Wyoming Cowboys	Georgia State Panthers
(7–5)	(7–5)
Mountain West	Sun Belt
38	17
Head coach: Craig Bohl	Head coach: Shawn Elliott
	1	2	3	4	Total
Wyoming	17	7	14	0	38
Georgia State	7	3	7	0	17
- Date: December 31, 2019
- Season: 2019
- Stadium: Arizona Stadium
- Location: Tucson, Arizona
- MVP: Xazavian Valladay (RB, Wyoming) & Alijah Halliburton (S, Wyoming)
- Favorite: Wyoming by 7.5
- Referee: Anthony Calabrese (AAC)
- Attendance: 36,892
- Payout: US$350,000

United States TV coverage
- Network: CBS Sports Network
- Announcers: Rich Waltz (play-by-play), Aaron Murray (analyst) and John Schriffen (sideline)

The 2019 Arizona Bowl was a college football bowl game played on December 31, 2019, with kickoff at 4:30 p.m. EST (2:30 p.m. local MST) on CBS Sports Network. It was the 5th edition of the Arizona Bowl, and one of the 2019–20 bowl games concluding the 2019 FBS football season. Sponsored by the Nova Home Loans mortgage broker company, the game was officially known as the Nova Home Loans Arizona Bowl.

== Teams ==
The game was played between the Wyoming Cowboys from the Mountain West Conference and the Georgia State Panthers from the Sun Belt Conference. This was the first time that the two programs met, and the first Arizona Bowl appearance for both programs.

=== Wyoming Cowboys ===
Wyoming entered the game with a 7–5 record (4–4 in conference), having lost three of four games to end their regular season. They finished in fourth place in Mountain West's Mountain Division. The Cowboys lost to the only ranked FBS team they faced, Boise State.

=== Georgia State Panthers ===
Georgia State also entered the game with a 7–5 record (4–4 in conference), also having lost three of four games to end their regular season. They finished in third place in the Sun Belt's East Division. The Panthers also lost to the only ranked FBS team they faced, Appalachian State.

== Game summary ==
2019 Nova Home Loans Arizona Bowl

Quarter	1	2	3	4	Total
Wyoming	17	7	14	0	38
Georgia State	7	3	7	0	17

at Arizona Stadium • Tucson, Arizona

- Date: Tuesday, December 31, 2019
- Game time: 4:30 p.m. EST (2:30 p.m. MST)
- Game weather: Mostly sunny • Temperature: 62 °F (17 °C) • Wind: 4 mph
- Game attendance: 36,892
- Referee: Anthony Calabrese
- TV announcers (CBSSN): Rich Waltz (play-by-play), Aaron Murray (analyst) and John Schriffen (sideline)
- ESPN game summary

Game information

First Quarter

- (12:59) GSU – Dan Ellington 4 yard rush, Brandon Wright kick (Drive: 6 plays, 75 yards, 2:01; Georgia State 7–0)
- (9:01) WYO – Cooper Rothe 53 yard field goal (Drive: 11 plays, 39 yards, 3:58; Georgia State 7–3)
- (2:12) WYO – Levi Williams 18 yard pass to Austin Conway, Cooper Rothe kick (Drive: 3 plays, 23 yards, 0:47; Wyoming 10–7)
- (0:35) WYO – Levi Williams 8 yard pass to Xazavian Valladay, Cooper Rothe kick (Drive: 3 plays, 11 yards, 1:27; Wyoming 17–7)

Second Quarter

- (9:31) GSU – Brandon Wright 25 yard field goal (Drive: 13 plays, 57 yards, 6:04; Wyoming 17–10)
- (0:32) WYO – Levi Williams 51 yard pass to Ayden Eberhardt, Cooper Rothe kick (Drive: 6 plays, 60 yards, 1:29; Wyoming 24–10)

Third Quarter

- (8:12) WYO – Xazavian Valladay 1 yard rush, Cooper Rothe kick (Drive: 5 plays, 86 yards, 2:16; Wyoming 31–10)
- (7:43) GSU – Dan Ellington 44 yard pass to Cornelius McCoy, Brandon Wright kick (Drive: 2 plays, 75 yards, 0:29; Wyoming 31–17)
- (1:21) WYO – Levi Williams 6 yard rush, Cooper Rothe kick (Drive: 4 plays, 74 yards, 1:41; Wyoming 38–17)

Fourth Quarter
No scoring

=== Statistics ===
Statistics	WYO	GSU
First downs	24	16
Plays–yards	73–524	65–355
Rushes–yards	47–290	38–199
Passing yards	234	156
Passing: comp–att–int	13–27–1	11–26–1
Time of possession	33:51	26:09

Team	Category	Player	Statistics
Wyoming	Passing	Levi Williams	11/26, 234 yards, 3 TD, 1 INT
Wyoming	Rushing	Xazavian Valladay	26 carries, 204 yards, 1 TD
Wyoming	Receiving	Xazavian Valladay	3 receptions, 91 yards, 1 TD
Georgia State	Passing	Dan Ellington	13/26, 156 yards, 1 TD, 1 INT
Georgia State	Rushing	Dan Ellington	14 carries, 70 yards, 1 TD
Georgia State	Receiving	Cornelius McCoy	5 receptions, 78 yards, 1 TD
