= Tyler Hall (American football) =

American football player (born 1998)

Profile
- Position: Cornerback

Personal information
- Born: October 31, 1998 (age 28); Hawthorne, California, U.S.
- Listed height: 5 ft 10 in (1.78 m)
- Listed weight: 190 lb (86 kg)

Career information
- High school: Junípero Serra (Gardena, CA)
- College: Wyoming (2016–2019)
- NFL draft: 2020: undrafted

Career history
- Atlanta Falcons (2020); Los Angeles Rams (2021); Las Vegas Raiders (2022–2023); Philadelphia Eagles (2024)*; Seattle Seahawks (2024)*; Jacksonville Jaguars (2024)*; Seattle Seahawks (2024–2025); Cleveland Browns (2026)*
- * Offseason or practice squad member only

Awards and highlights
- 2× Super Bowl champion (LVI, LX)

Career NFL statistics as of 2025
- Total tackles: 46
- Sacks: 1.0
- Pass deflections: 4
- Stats at Pro Football Reference

Tyler Hall (born October 31, 1998) is an American professional football cornerback. He was signed by the Atlanta Falcons as an undrafted free agent in 2020 following his college football career with the Wyoming Cowboys. He has also played in the NFL for the Los Angeles Rams, Las Vegas Raiders, Seattle Seahawks, and Cleveland Browns. He won Super Bowl LVI with the Rams, and won Super Bowl LX with the Seahawks.

== Professional career ==
Pre-draft measurables
Height	Weight	Arm length	Hand span	Wingspan	40-yard dash	10-yard split	20-yard split	20-yard shuttle	Three-cone drill	Vertical jump	Broad jump	Bench press
5 ft 8 3/8 in (1.74 m)	186 lb (84 kg)	30 3/8 in (0.77 m)	8 1/4 in (0.21 m)	6 ft 0 3/4 in (1.85 m)	4.41 s	1.62 s	2.61 s	4.31 s	7.22 s	38.0 in (0.97 m)	10 ft 9 in (3.28 m)	17 reps
All values from Pro Day

=== Atlanta Falcons ===
Hall signed with the Atlanta Falcons as an undrafted free agent following the 2020 NFL draft on April 27, 2020. He was waived during final roster cuts on September 5, and signed to the team's practice squad the next day. He was released from the practice squad on September 22, and re-signed to the practice squad three days later. He was elevated to the active roster on September 26 and October 10 for the team's weeks 3 and 5 games against the Chicago Bears and Carolina Panthers, and reverted to the practice squad after each game. He made his NFL debut against the Bears, playing 17 snaps on special teams. He was promoted to the active roster on October 13.

Hall signed a contract extension with the Falcons on March 11, 2021. He was released on August 9, 2021.

=== Los Angeles Rams ===
On August 10, 2021, Hall was claimed off waivers by the Los Angeles Rams. He was waived on August 31, and re-signed to the practice squad the next day. Hall won Super Bowl LVI when the Rams beat the Cincinnati Bengals.

On February 15, 2022, Hall signed a reserve/future contract with the Rams. He was waived/injured on August 30, and placed on injured reserve. Hall was waived off injured reserve on September 6.

=== Las Vegas Raiders ===
On October 11, 2022, Hall was signed to the Las Vegas Raiders practice squad. Hall recorded his first sack on November 20, during a pivotal moment against the Denver Broncos, sacking Russell Wilson. Hall was elevated for the following game against the Seattle Seahawks, his first start in the NFL. On November 28, Hall was signed to the active roster.

On August 29, 2023, Hall was waived by the Raiders and re-signed to the practice squad. He was promoted to the active roster on October 18. Hall appeared in 11 games (3 starts) for Las Vegas in 2023, logging 20 total tackles.

=== Philadelphia Eagles ===
On March 21, 2024, Hall signed with the Philadelphia Eagles. He was placed on injured reserve on August 17.

=== Seattle Seahawks (first stint) ===
On September 24, 2024, Hall was signed to the Seattle Seahawks' practice squad, but released three days later.

=== Jacksonville Jaguars ===
On October 1, 2024, Hall signed with the Jacksonville Jaguars' practice squad. He was released on December 3.

=== Seattle Seahawks (second stint) ===
On December 31, 2024, Hall was signed to the Seattle Seahawks' practice squad. He signed a reserve/future contract with Seattle on January 6, 2025.

On August 26, 2025, Hall was released by the Seahawks with an injury settlement as part of final roster cuts. He was re-signed to the practice squad on November 14. On February 12, 2026, Hall signed a reserve/futures contract with Seattle. He was released by the Seahawks on March 13.

=== Cleveland Browns ===
On August 4, 2026, Hall signed with the Cleveland Browns. On August 28, he was released by the Browns as a part of final roster cuts.
