= Aaron Bohl =

American football coach (born 1994)

Current position
- Title: Defensive coordinator & linebackers coach
- Team: Wyoming
- Conference: MW

Biographical details
- Born: January 1, 1994 (age 32); Lincoln, Nebraska, U.S.

Playing career
- 2012–2016: Minnesota State–Moorhead
- Position: Linebacker

Coaching career (HC unless noted)
- 2017–2018: Wyoming (GA)
- 2019–2023: Wyoming (LB)
- 2024–present: Wyoming (DC/LB)

Aaron Bohl (born January 1, 1994) is an American college football coach. He is the defensive coordinator and linebackers coach for the University of Wyoming, positions he has held since 2024.

== Playing career ==
Bohl played football at Lincoln East High School and committed to play college football at Minnesota State University Moorhead. He played four seasons as a linebacker for Minnesota State–Moorhead, where he was a three-year team captain and a second-team all-Northern Sun Intercollegiate Conference (NSIC) selection as a senior.

== Coaching career ==
In 2017, Bohl got his first coaching job as a graduate assistant for Wyoming. In 2019, Bohl was promoted to coach the Cowboy's linebackers. After the 2023 season, Bohl was once again promoted by the Cowboys this time to serve as the team's defensive coordinator and linebackers coach.

== Personal life ==
Bohl is the son of former Wyoming head coach Craig Bohl.
