= Easton Gibbs =

American football player (born 2001)

Profile
- Position: Linebacker

Personal information
- Born: April 27, 2001 (age 25); Temecula, California, U.S.
- Listed height: 6 ft 0 in (1.83 m)
- Listed weight: 232 lb (105 kg)

Career information
- High school: Temecula Valley
- College: Wyoming (2019–2023)
- NFL draft: 2024: undrafted

Career history
- Seattle Seahawks (2024)*; Pittsburgh Steelers (2024)*; Seattle Seahawks (2024)*
- * Offseason or practice squad member only

Awards and highlights
- 2× First-team All-Mountain West (2022, 2023)
- Stats at Pro Football Reference

Easton Gibbs (born April 27, 2001) is an American professional football linebacker. He played college football at Wyoming.

== Early life ==
Gibbs attended high school at Temecula Valley. Coming out of high school, Gibbs was rated as a two-star recruit; he committed to play college football for the Wyoming Cowboys.

== College career ==
During the 2020 season finale, Gibbs posted 13 tackles against Boise State. In the 2020 season, Gibbs recorded 42 tackles with two and a half being for a loss. During the 2021 season, Gibbs notched 90 tackles with seven being for a loss, two sacks, and four pass deflections, where for his performance he was named an honorable mention all Mountain West member. In week twelve of the 2023 season Gibbs posted 13 tackles and a sack in a win over rival Colorado State. During the 2022 season, Gibbs tallied 122 tackles with nine being for a loss, three sacks, and a forced fumble. For his performance in the 2022 season, Gibbs was named first team all Mountain West. Heading into the 2023 season, Gibbs was named the Mountain West preseason defensive player of the year. Gibbs was also named to the preseason Bronco Nagurski Award watch list. In the 2023 season, Gibbs notched 109 tackles with four being for a loss, two sacks, six pass deflections, an interception, two forced fumbles, and a fumble recovery. For his performance on the 2023 season, Gibbs was again named first team all Mountain West.

During Gibbs career with the Cowboys, he totaled 361 tackles with 22.5 going for a loss, seven sacks, eleven pass deflections, an interception, two fumble recoveries, three forced fumbles, and a touchdown.

== Professional career ==
Pre-draft measurables
Height	Weight	Arm length	Hand span	Wingspan	40-yard dash	10-yard split	20-yard split	20-yard shuttle	Three-cone drill	Vertical jump	Broad jump	Bench press
6 ft 0 3/8 in (1.84 m)	232 lb (105 kg)	30 3/8 in (0.77 m)	9 1/4 in (0.23 m)	6 ft 0 1/2 in (1.84 m)	4.73 s	1.59 s	2.73 s	4.37 s	6.98 s	34.5 in (0.88 m)	9 ft 8 in (2.95 m)	20 reps
All values from NFL Combine/Pro Day

=== Seattle Seahawks (first stint) ===
Gibbs signed with the Seattle Seahawks as an undrafted free agent on May 3, 2024.

On July 18, 2024, Gibbs was placed on the Active/Non-football injury or illness (NFI) list. He was released on July 31.

=== Pittsburgh Steelers ===
Gibbs was signed by the Pittsburgh Steelers on August 7, 2024 but was waived three days later.

=== Seattle Seahawks (second stint) ===
On August 14, 2024, Gibbs re-signed with the Seattle Seahawks. He was waived on August 27.
