= Ayden Eberhardt =

American gridiron football player (born 1998)

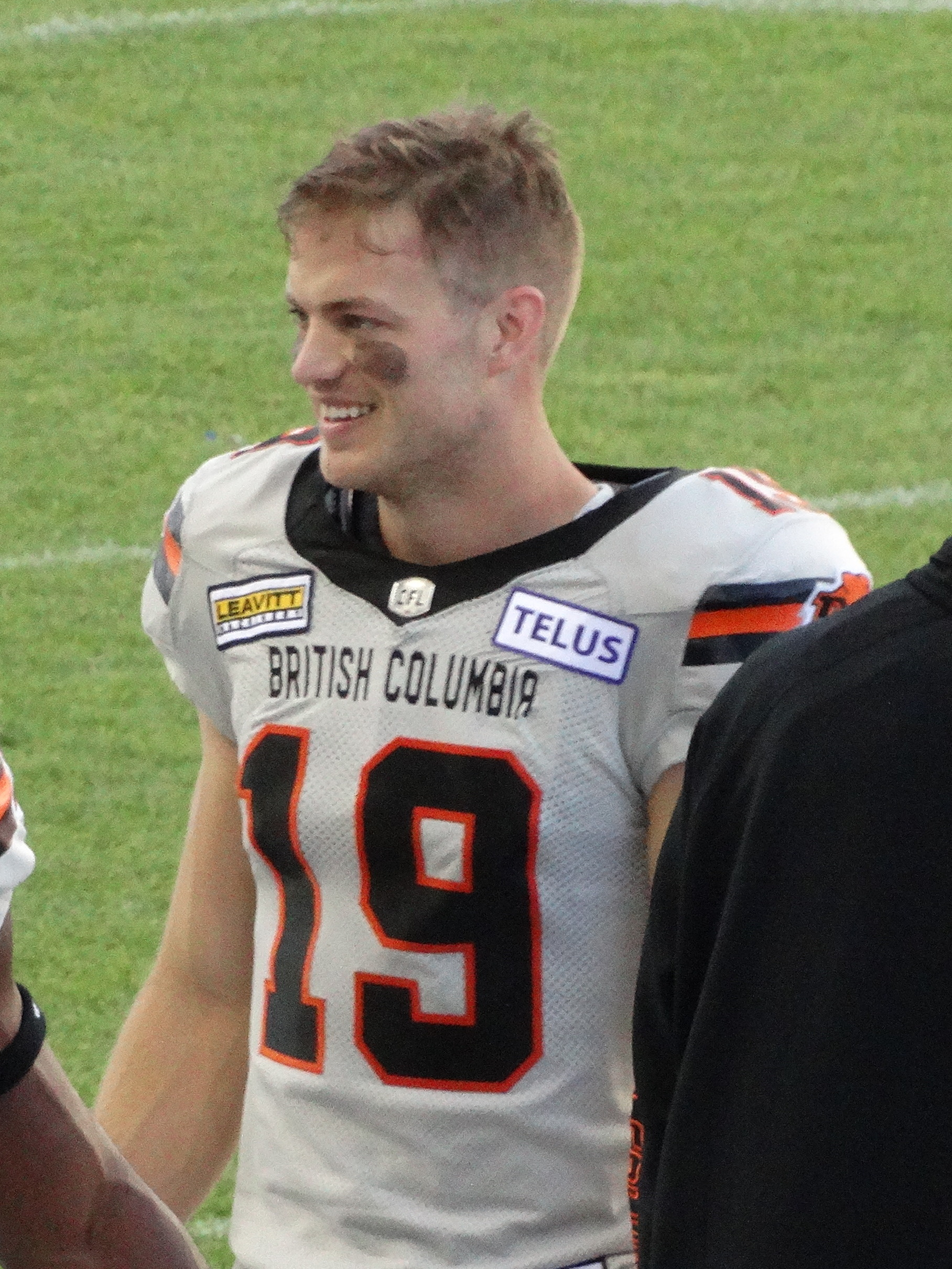
- Eberhardt with the BC Lions in 2024

No. 7 – Ottawa Redblacks
- Position: Wide receiver
- Roster status: Active
- CFL status: American

Personal information
- Born: May 3, 1998 (age 28); Loveland, Colorado, U.S.
- Listed height: 6 ft 1 in (1.85 m)
- Listed weight: 200 lb (91 kg)

Career information
- High school: Loveland (Colorado)
- College: Wyoming (2016–2021)
- NFL draft: 2022: undrafted

Career history
- 2023–2025: BC Lions
- 2026–present: Ottawa Redblacks

Awards and highlights
- CFL East All-Star (2026)
- Stats at CFL.ca

Ayden Eberhardt (born May 3, 1998) is an American professional football wide receiver for the Ottawa Redblacks of the Canadian Football League (CFL). He played college football at Wyoming.

== Early life ==
Eberhardt played high school football at Loveland High School in Loveland, Colorado.

== College career ==
Eberhardt played college football at Wyoming from 2017 to 2021. He was redshirted in 2016. He played in seven games in 2017 but did not record any statistics. Eberhardt appeared in 12 games in 2018, catching five passes for 46 yards and making five tackles on special teams. He played in 13 games, starting two, in 2019, recording eight receptions for 168 yards and two touchdowns while also totaling eight special teams tackles. He appeared in six games in the COVID-19 shortened 2020 season, catching 16 passes for 252 yards. Eberhardt played in eight games, starting one, in 2021, totaling 21 receptions for 298 yards. In 2021, he was also a semifinalist for the William V. Campbell Trophy, which is given to college football's best scholar-athlete.

== Professional career ==
Pre-draft measurables
Height	Weight	Arm length	Hand span	Wingspan
6 ft 1 1/4 in (1.86 m)	189 lb (86 kg)	30 1/4 in (0.77 m)	9 1/4 in (0.23 m)	6 ft 2 in (1.88 m)
All values from Pro Day

Eberhardt went undrafted in the 2022 NFL draft.

=== BC Lions ===
Eberhardt signed with the BC Lions of the Canadian Football League (CFL) on January 27, 2023. He was moved to the practice roster on June 4, promoted to the active roster on June 16, moved back to the practice roster on July 2, and released on November 13, 2023. He played in two games, both starts, for the Lions in 2023, catching five passes for 69 yards. Eberhardt re-signed with the Lions on November 22, 2023.

Eberhardt started all 18 games for the Lions in 2024, recording 41 receptions on 58 targets for 639 yards and two touchdowns. The Lions finished the 2024 season with a 9–9 record and lost to the Saskatchewan Roughriders in the Western semifinal.

Eberhardt started all 18 games for the second straight season in 2025, catching 45 passes on 67 targets for 863 yards and four touchdowns. The Lions went 11–7 and lost in the West Final to the Roughriders. He became a free agent upon the expiry of his contract on February 10, 2026.

=== Ottawa Redblacks ===
On February 1, 2026, it was reported that Eberhardt had agreed to terms with the Ottawa Redblacks. On February 10, 2026, the first day of free agency, the signing of a two-year contract was made official. On October 16, 2026, against the Toronto Argonauts, Eberhardt caught nine passes for 101 yards and two touchdowns, including a 24-yard touchdown from Bryson Barnes with six seconds left to help the Redblacks win 40–39. The victory ended Ottawa's 22-game losing streak (the longest in modern CFL history). Eberhardt earned CFL Player of the Week honors for Week 20. Overall in 2026, he started all 18 games for the third consecutive year, totaling a team-leading 92 receptions on 136 targets for 1,166 yards and nine touchdowns. He was named a CFL East All-Star for his performance during the 2026 season.
