= Jaylen Pate =

American football player (born 2001)

No. 90 – Saskatchewan Roughriders
- Position: Defensive lineman
- Roster status: Active
- CFL status: American

Personal information
- Born: July 22, 2001 (age 25)
- Listed height: 6 ft 3 in (1.91 m)
- Listed weight: 272 lb (123 kg)

Career information
- High school: Lane Tech (Chicago, Illinois)
- College: Wyoming (2019–2021); Northwestern (2022–2024)
- NFL draft: 2025: undrafted

Career history
- Saskatchewan Roughriders (2026–present)
- Stats at CFL.ca

Jaylen Pate (born July 22, 2001) is an American professional football defensive lineman for the Saskatchewan Roughriders of the Canadian Football League (CFL). He played college football for the Wyoming Cowboys and Northwestern Wildcats.

== Early life ==
Pate was born on July 22, 2001. He attended Lane Tech College Prep High School in Chicago, Illinois. As a senior, Pate had 81 tackles, including 27 for loss, 11 sacks, four forced fumbles, three fumble recoveries and one pick-six.

== College career ==
Pate played college football for the Wyoming Cowboys from 2019 to 2021 and Northwestern Wildcats from 2022 to 2024. In 19 games at Wyoming, he made 27 tackles, 1.5 sacks, one pass deflection and one fumble recovery. On January 19, 2022, Pate entered the transfer portal, committing to play at Northwestern University.

Pate played 33 games for the Wildcats, recording 55 tackles, including nine for loss, three sacks, one pass deflection and one forced fumble.

== Professional career ==
On January 5, 2026, Pate was signed by the Saskatchewan Roughriders of the Canadian Football League (CFL). On May 30, he was signed to the practice roster. On June 25, Pate was elevated to the active roster and made his CFL debut the following day. He had two tackles and one sack in his first game against the Toronto Argonauts. On July 31, Pate was assigned to the practice roster. On October 1, he was promoted to the active roster.
