= Craig Bohl =

American football player and coach (born 1958)

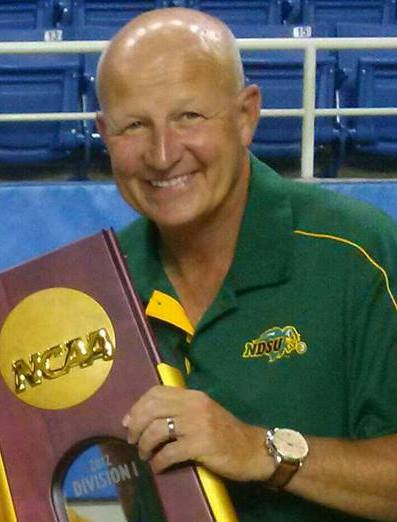
- Bohl holding one of his FCS National Championship trophies in 2013

Biographical details
- Born: July 27, 1958 (age 68); Lincoln, Nebraska, U.S.

Playing career
- 1977–1979: Nebraska
- Position: Defensive back

Coaching career (HC unless noted)
- 1981–1983: Nebraska (GA)
- 1984: North Dakota State (DB)
- 1985–1986: Tulsa (LB)
- 1987–1988: Wisconsin (LB)
- 1989–1993: Rice (DC)
- 1994: Duke (DC/LB)
- 1995–1999: Nebraska (LB)
- 2000–2002: Nebraska (DC/LB)
- 2003–2013: North Dakota State
- 2014–2023: Wyoming

Head coaching record
- Overall: 165–92
- Bowls: 4–2
- Tournaments: 13–1 (NCAA D-I playoffs)

Accomplishments and honors

Championships
- As a head coach 3 NCAA Division I FCS (2011–2013); 1 Great West (2006); 3 MVFC (2011–2013); 1 MW Mountain Division (2016) As an assistant coach 2 National (1995, 1997); 4 Big Eight (1981–1983, 1995); 1 Big 12 (1997); 2 Big 12 North Division (1996, 1997)

Awards
- 2× Eddie Robinson Award (2012, 2013); 2× AFCA Coach of the Year (2012, 2013); Great West Coach of the Year (2006); 3× MVFC Coach of the Year (2011–2013); MW Coach of the Year (2016)

Craig Philip Bohl (born July 27, 1958) is an American retired college football coach and former player. Prior to announcing his retirement from coaching at the conclusion of the 2023 football season, he was the head football coach at the University of Wyoming for 10 seasons. Before being hired in Laramie, he was the head coach at North Dakota State University in Fargo from 2003 to 2013, where he led the Bison to three consecutive NCAA Division I Football Championships in his final three seasons.

== Early years ==
Born in Lincoln, Nebraska, Bohl was a reserve defensive back for the Nebraska Cornhuskers from 1977 to 1979. He earned a bachelor's degree in business from the University of Nebraska–Lincoln in 1982.

== Coaching career ==
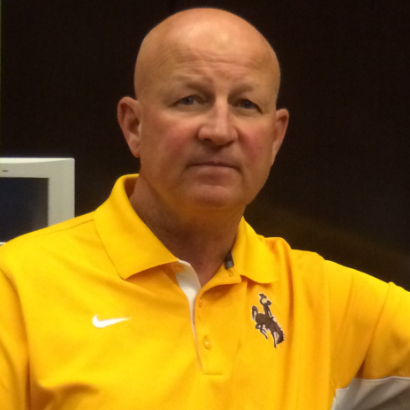
Bohl at 2016 Mountain West Media Days

=== Assistant coaching ===
Bohl was an assistant coach for many different programs for 19 years, including at his alma mater Nebraska for eight seasons, the last three as defensive coordinator. He was a coach for two national championship teams at Nebraska, in 1995 and 1997.

=== North Dakota State ===
Bohl was hired as head coach at NDSU in 2003. As its 29th head football coach, he guided the storied program as it transitioned from Division II, where they had won eight national championships, to Division I. Four years after completing the move, he led the Bison to their first ever FCS Championship title in 2011, beating Sam Houston State 17–6 in the final. On January 1, 2013, North Dakota State gave Bohl an eight-year contract extension through the 2020 season, and four days later, he rewarded them by leading the Bison to their second consecutive FCS Championship, defeating Sam Houston State again, 39−13.

In the 2013 season opener on August 30, NDSU upset defending Big 12 champion Kansas State 24–21. Bohl won more games than any other NDSU head football coach; he surpassed Rocky Hager on September 21 with his 92nd win.

On Saturday, January 4, 2014, he led the Bison to their third straight FCS football championship, downing Towson 35–7. The Bison were the second team in FCS history to three straight national championships, after Appalachian State (2005–2007).

=== Wyoming ===
Bohl was hired at Wyoming of the Mountain West Conference in December 2013 and took over in January, after leading North Dakota State to the 2013 FCS title.

Following two difficult seasons with a combined record of 6–18 (4–12 in conference play), Bohl's Cowboys went 8–4 (6–2 in conference play) to win the Mountain Division in 2016. On November 29, 2016, Bohl was selected as the Mountain West Conference Coach of the Year. On the eve of Wyoming's first conference championship game in twenty years, Wyoming gave Bohl a contract extension through 2023. Wyoming was invited to their first bowl game in five seasons at the end of the 2016 season, the 2016 Poinsettia Bowl, losing to BYU, 24–21.

In 2017, Wyoming again finished with a winning record, and were invited to the 2017 Famous Idaho Potato Bowl, defeating Central Michigan 37–14. This marked the first time since the 1987-86 seasons that Wyoming had played in bowl games in consecutive years. Wyoming reached bowl eligibility in 2018 and 2019, and were invited to the 2019 Arizona Bowl, defeating Georgia State 38–17.

In 2020, Bohl again received a contract extension, this time through the 2024 season.

On December 6, 2023, Bohl announced his retirement from the Wyoming program, effective after the Cowboys' Arizona Bowl appearance on December 30.

== Head coaching record ==
Year	Team	Overall	Conference	Standing	Bowl/playoffs	Media^{#}	Coaches^{°}
North Dakota State Bison (North Central Conference) (2003)
2003	North Dakota State	8–3	5–2	T–2nd		10	23
North Dakota State Bison (Great West Conference) (2004–2007)
2004	North Dakota State	8–3	2–3	3rd	Ineligible	23	23
2005	North Dakota State	7–4	3–2	3rd	Ineligible		
2006	North Dakota State	10–1	4–0	1st	Ineligible	5	5
2007	North Dakota State	10–1	3–1	2nd	Ineligible	9	9
North Dakota State Bison (Missouri Valley Football Conference) (2008–2013)
2008	North Dakota State	6–5	4–4	T–4th			
2009	North Dakota State	3–8	2–6	7th			
2010	North Dakota State	9–5	4–4	T–3rd	L NCAA Division I Quarterfinal	9	9
2011	North Dakota State	14–1	7–1	T–1st	W NCAA Division I Championship	1	1
2012	North Dakota State	14–1	7–1	1st	W NCAA Division I Championship	1	1
2013	North Dakota State	15–0	8–0	1st	W NCAA Division I Championship	1	1
North Dakota State:		104–32	49–24				
Wyoming Cowboys (Mountain West Conference) (2014–present)
2014	Wyoming	4–8	2–6	T–5th (Mountain)			
2015	Wyoming	2–10	2–6	6th (Mountain)			
2016	Wyoming	8–6	6–2	T–1st (Mountain)	L Poinsettia		
2017	Wyoming	8–5	5–3	T–2nd (Mountain)	W Famous Idaho Potato		
2018	Wyoming	6–6	4–4	3rd (Mountain)			
2019	Wyoming	8–5	4–4	4th (Mountain)	W Arizona		
2020	Wyoming	2–4	2–4	8th			
2021	Wyoming	7–6	2–6	T–4th (Mountain)	W Famous Idaho Potato		
2022	Wyoming	7–6	5–3	T–2nd (Mountain)	L Arizona		
2023	Wyoming	9–4	5–3	T–4th	W Arizona		
Wyoming:		61–60	37–41				
Total:		165–92					
National championship Conference title Conference division title or championship game berth
^{#}Rankings from the final Dopke poll for North Dakota State (2003), final Sports Network poll for North Dakota State (2004–2013), and AP Poll for Wyoming from 2014 to present..; ^{°}Rankings from the AFCA Poll for North Dakota State (2003), FCS Coaches' Poll for North Dakota State (2004–2013) and USA Today Coaches' Poll for Wyoming (2014–present)..
