= Azizi Hearn =

American football player (born 1999)

No. 20 – DC Defenders
- Position: Cornerback
- Roster status: Active

Personal information
- Born: June 5, 1999 (age 27); Oceanside, California, U.S.
- Listed height: 6 ft 0 in (1.83 m)
- Listed weight: 204 lb (93 kg)

Career information
- High school: Oceanside
- College: Arizona (2017–2018); Wyoming (2019–2021); UCLA (2022)
- NFL draft: 2023: undrafted

Career history
- Las Vegas Raiders (2023)*; New England Patriots (2023–2024)*; Carolina Panthers (2024)*; New York Giants (2024)*; Kansas City Chiefs (2025)*; DC Defenders (2026–present)
- * Offseason or practice squad member only
- Stats at Pro Football Reference

Azizi Hearn (born June 5, 1999) is an American professional football cornerback for the DC Defenders of the United Football League (UFL). He played college football for the Arizona Wildcats, Wyoming Cowboys and UCLA Bruins. He was signed in 2023 as a practice squad player for the New England Patriots.

== Early life ==
Hearn grew up in Oceanside, California and attended Oceanside High School. He was rated a three-star recruit and committed to play college football at Arizona as a walk-on.

== College career ==
=== Arizona ===
Hearn redshirted during his true freshman season in 2017. During the 2018 season, he played all 12 games and started the final three games at cornerback. He finished the season with 26 recorded tackles (20 solo stops and six assisted), 1.0 tackle for a loss, a returned fumble for 34 yards and a touchdown.

On April 11, 2019, it was announced that Hearn had been removed from Arizona's roster. He ultimately transferred to Wyoming.

=== Wyoming ===
During the 2019 season, Hearn played in all 13 games and started 10 of them. He finished the season with 37 total tackles (26 solo stops and 11 assisted), one tackle for loss and four pass breakups. During the 2020 season, he played in and started in six games and finished the season with 13 recorded tackles (nine solo stops and four assisted) and four pass breakups. During the 2021 season, he played in and started all 13 games and finished the season with 30 recorded tackles (22 solo stops and eight assisted) and five pass breakups.

On December 26, 2021, Hearn announced that he would be entering the transfer portal. On January 17, 2022, he announced that he would be transferring to UCLA.

=== UCLA ===
During the 2022 season, he appeared in all 13 games and started six of them. He finished the season with 40 recorded tackles (26 solo stops and 14 assisted) and seven passing breakups.

== Professional career ==
Pre-draft measurables
Height	Weight	Arm length	Hand span	Wingspan	40-yard dash	10-yard split	20-yard split	20-yard shuttle	Three-cone drill	Vertical jump	Broad jump	Bench press
6 ft 0 1/2 in (1.84 m)	206 lb (93 kg)	31 1/2 in (0.80 m)	8 7/8 in (0.23 m)	6 ft 2 5/8 in (1.90 m)	4.48 s	1.59 s	2.62 s	4.23 s	6.92 s	37.5 in (0.95 m)	10 ft 7 in (3.23 m)	18 reps
All values from Pro Day

=== Las Vegas Raiders ===
On May 12, 2023, Hearn was signed to the Las Vegas Raiders as an undrafted free agent after going unselected in the 2023 NFL draft. He was released on August 29.

=== New England Patriots ===
On September 21, 2023, Hearn was signed to the New England Patriots practice squad. He signed a reserve/future contract with the Patriots on January 8, 2024. Hearn was released by the Patriots on August 26.

=== Carolina Panthers ===
On September 10, 2024, Hearn was signed to the Carolina Panthers practice squad. He was released on October 1.

=== New York Giants ===
On December 10, 2024, the New York Giants signed Hearn to their practice squad.

=== Kansas City Chiefs ===
On August 1, 2025, Hearn signed with the Kansas City Chiefs. He was waived on August 26 as part of final roster cuts.

=== DC Defenders ===
On January 14, 2026, Hearn was selected by the DC Defenders of the United Football League (UFL).
