= 2019 Boise State Broncos football team =

American college football season

2019 Boise State Broncos football

Mountain West champion MW Mountain Division champion

MW Championship Game, W 31–10 vs. Hawaii

Las Vegas Bowl, L 7–38 vs. Washington
- Conference: Mountain West Conference
- Mountain Division

Ranking
- Coaches: No. 22
- AP: No. 23
- Record: 12–2 (8–0 MW)
- Head coach: Bryan Harsin (6th season)
- Co-offensive coordinators: Zak Hill (4th season); Eric Kiesau (1st season)
- Offensive scheme: Multiple
- Co-defensive coordinators: Spencer Danielson (1st season); Jeff Schmedding (1st season)
- Base defense: Multiple
- Home stadium: Albertsons Stadium

Uniform
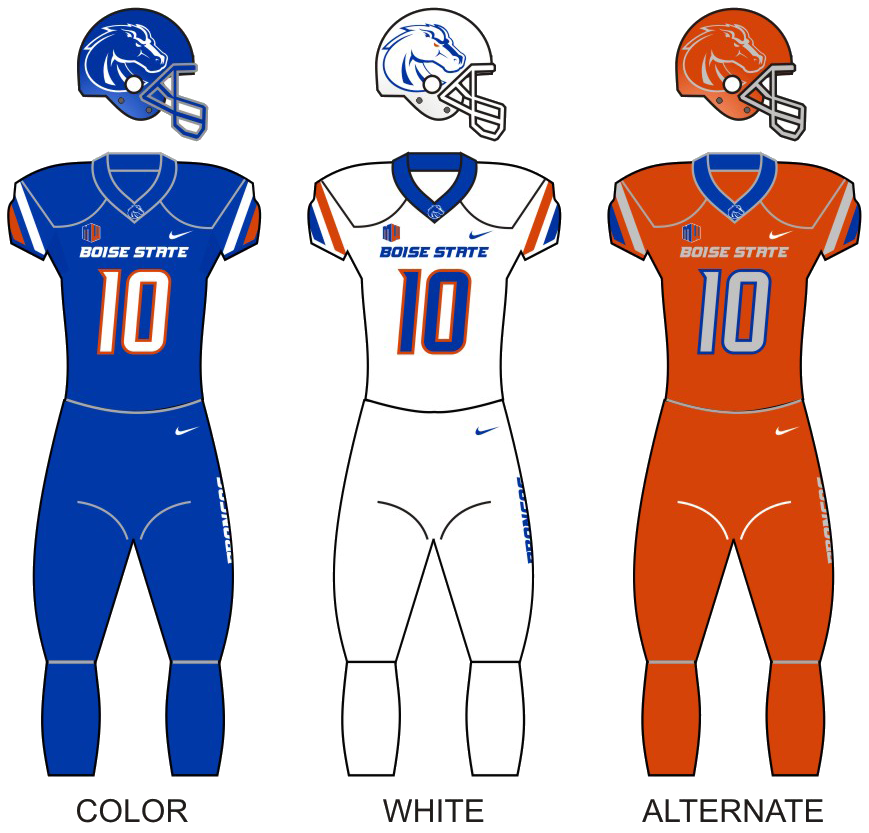

2019 Mountain West Conference football standings
	Conf.			Overall
Team	W		L	W		L
Mountain Division
No. 23 Boise State xy$	8	–	0	12	–	2
No. 22 Air Force	7	–	1	11	–	2
Utah State	6	–	2	7	–	6
Wyoming	4	–	4	8	–	5
Colorado State	3	–	5	4	–	8
New Mexico	0	–	8	2	–	10
West Division
Hawaii xy	5	–	3	10	–	5
San Diego State x	5	–	3	10	–	3
Nevada	4	–	4	7	–	6
San Jose State	2	–	6	5	–	7
UNLV	2	–	6	4	–	8
Fresno State	2	–	6	4	–	8
Championship: Boise State 31, Hawaii 10
$ – Conference champion; x – Division champion/co-champions; y – Championship game participant; Rankings from AP Poll

The 2019 Boise State Broncos football team represented Boise State University during the 2019 NCAA Division I FBS football season. This was the Broncos' 83rd season overall, sixth under head coach Bryan Harsin, ninth as a member of the Mountain West Conference and seventh within the Mountain Division. The Broncos played their home games at Albertsons Stadium in Boise, Idaho. They finished the season 12–2, 8–0 in Mountain West play to be champions of the Mountain Division. This was the first time since joining the Mountain West in 2011 that they went undefeated in conference play. They represented the Mountain Division in the Mountain West Championship Game where they defeated Hawaii to become Mountain West champions for the fourth time. This was Boise State's 20th overall conference championship since they first joined a conference in 1970. They were invited to the Las Vegas Bowl where they lost to Washington. Boise State finished ranked in the final polls for the 13th time since 2002.

== Preseason ==
=== Mountain West media days ===
The Mountain West media days will be held in July 2019 at the Cosmopolitan on the Las Vegas Strip.

=== Media poll ===
The preseason poll was released at the Mountain West media days on July 23, 2019. The Broncos were predicted to finish in first place in the MW Mountain Division.

== Schedule ==
Date	Time	Opponent	Rank	Site	TV	Result	Attendance
August 31	10:00 a.m.	at Florida State*		Doak Campbell Stadium; Tallahassee, FL (Note: The game against Florida State was originally scheduled for 5:00 p.m. MDT at TIAA Bank Stadium in Jacksonville, but was relocated and moved to an earlier time because of safety concerns related to Hurricane Dorian.)	ESPNews	W 36–31	50,917
September 6	7:00 p.m.	Marshall*	No. 24	Albertsons Stadium; Boise, ID	ESPN2	W 14–7	31,951
September 14	8:30 p.m.	Portland State*	No. 22	Albertsons Stadium; Boise, ID	ESPN2	W 45–10	31,068
September 20	7:00 p.m.	Air Force	No. 20	Albertsons Stadium; Boise, ID	ESPN2	W 30–19	36,498
October 5	8:30 p.m.	at UNLV	No. 16	Sam Boyd Stadium; Whitney, NV	CBSSN	W 38–13	24,681
October 12	8:15 p.m.	Hawaii^{†}	No. 14	Albertsons Stadium; Boise, ID	ESPN2	W 59–37	36,902 (Note: Largest attendance in Albertsons Stadium history. The previous record was 36,864 set in 2012.)
October 19	8:15 p.m.	at BYU*	No. 14	LaVell Edwards Stadium; Provo, UT	ESPN2	L 25–28	58,930
November 2	8:30 p.m.	at San Jose State	No. 21	CEFCU Stadium; San Jose, CA	CBSSN	W 52–42	19,184
November 9	8:15 p.m.	Wyoming	No. 22	Albertsons Stadium; Boise, ID	ESPN	W 20–17 ^{OT}	33,018
November 16	8:15 p.m.	New Mexico	No. 21	Albertsons Stadium; Boise, ID	ESPN2	W 42–9	31,492
November 23	8:30 p.m.	at Utah State	No. 20	Maverik Stadium; Logan, UT	CBSSN	W 56–21	18,315
November 29	1:30 p.m.	at Colorado State	No. 20	Canvas Stadium; Fort Collins, CO	CBSSN	W 31–24	12,324
December 7	2:00 p.m.	Hawaii	No. 19	Albertsons Stadium; Boise, ID (MW Championship Game)	ESPN	W 31–10	23,561
December 21	5:30 p.m.	vs. Washington*	No. 19	Sam Boyd Stadium; Whitney, NV (Las Vegas Bowl)	ABC	L 7–38	34,197
*Non-conference game; ^{†}Homecoming; Rankings from AP Poll and CFP Rankings after November 5 released prior to game; All times are in Mountain time

Schedule source:

== Roster ==
2019 Boise State Broncos football team roster
Players
Coaches
Offense

Pos.	#	Name	Class
WR	1	Octavius Evans	Jr
WR	2	Khalil Shakir	So
TE	3	Riley Smith	Fr
TE	5	Garrett Collingham	Sr
WR	6	C. T. Thomas	Jr
WR	7	Akilian Butler	Sr
QB	9	Jaylon Henderson	Sr
QB	10	Chase Cord	So
WR	15	Maclaine Griffin	Fr
WR	16	John Hightower	Sr
QB	17	Zach Matlock	Fr
WR	18	Billy Bowens	Fr
QB	19	Hank Bachmeier	Fr
RB	21	Andrew Van Buren	So
WR	23	Khyheem Waleed	Fr
RB	24	George Holani	Fr
WR	27	Shea Whiting	Fr
WR	32	Trevor Cole	Fr
RB	34	Robert Mahone	Jr
RB	37	Danny Smith	Fr
RB	39	Allamar Alexander	Fr
TE	47	Matt Pistone	Sr
OL	51	Dalton Lins	Fr
OL	55	Kekaniokoa Holomalia-Gonzalez	Fr
OL	58	Chase Bunker	Fr
OL	63	Keegan Ulrich	Fr
OL	66	Ben Dooley	Fr
OL	67	Garrett Larson	Sr
OL	68	Jake Stetz	Jr
OL	69	Garrett Curran	Fr
OL	70	John Ojukwu	So
OL	71	Donte Harrington	Jr
OL	72	Dallas Holliday	Fr
OL	73	Nick Crabtree	Jr
OL	74	Jacob Golden	Fr
OL	75	Kole Bailey	Jr
OL	76	Ezra Cleveland	Jr
OL	77	John Molchon	Sr
OL	78	Julian Simpson	Fr
OL	79	Eric Quevedo	Sr
WR	82	Stefan Cobbs	Fr
TE	84	Cole Ramseyer	Fr
TE	85	John Bates	Jr
TE	86	Tyler Eiguren	Fr
TE	87	Kaden DeLuna	Fr
TE	88	Tyneil Hopper	Fr
WR	89	Connor Riddle	Fr

Defense

Pos.	#	Name	Class
OLB	3	Brandon Hawkins	Fr
S	4	DeAndre Pierce	Jr
S	5	Evan Tyler	Sr
MLB	7	Ezekiel Noa	So
CB	8	Markel Reed	Fr
S	10	Kekoa Nawahine	Sr
CB	13	Marques Evans	So
S	14	Khafari Buffalo	Sr
CB	15	Jalen Walker	Jr
MLB	17	Phillip Mills	Fr
DE	19	Aisa Kelemete	So
CB	20	Roman Kafentzis	So
CB	21	Tyreque Jones	So
CB	22	Tyric LeBeauf	Fr
MLB	25	Benton Wickersham	Jr
CB	26	Avery Williams	Jr
CB	28	Kekaula Kaniho	Jr
CB	29	Chris Mitchell	Fr
DE	30	Isaiah Bagnah	Fr
OLB	31	Tyler Crowe	Fr
S	32	Jordan Happle	Jr
S	33	JL Skinner	Fr
DE	35	Kukea Emmsley	Fr
CB	37	Ozziah Williams	Jr
DE	38	Demitri Washington	Fr
S	39	A. J. Smith	So
DT	40	Jabari Watson	Jr
MLB	41	Josh Booker-Brown	Jr
OLB	44	Riley Whimpey	Jr
OLB	45	Nick Provenzano	Jr
S	46	Alexander Teubner	Fr
MLB	48	Bruno DeRose	Jr
DE	49	Dylan Herberg	Fr
OLB	52	D. J. Schramm	Fr
DE	53	Sam Whitney	Sr
DT	54	Matt Locher	Sr
DT	55	David Moa	GS
DE	56	Casey Kline	Fr
DT	57	Emmanuel Fesili	Sr
DE	59	Jadyn Ewing	Fr
DT	62	Scott Matlock	Fr
CB	83	Damon Cole	So
DT	90	Scale Igiehon	So
DE	91	Dylan Hall	Fr
DT	92	Michael Callahan	Fr
DT	93	Chase Hatada	Sr
DT	94	Jackson Cravens	Fr
DT	97	Keeghan Freeborn	Fr
DT	98	Sonatane Lui	Sr
DE	99	Curtis Weaver	Jr

Special teams

Pos.	#	Name	Class
K/P	36	Eric Sachse	Sr
LS	42	Daniel Cantrell	So
P	43	Gavin Wale	Fr
K/P	46	Joel Velazquez	Jr
LS	50	Nicholai Pitman	Sr
LS	95	Hunter Fridolfs	Fr
K	96	Ryan Meyer	Fr

Head coach

- Bryan Harsin

Coordinators/assistant coaches

- Kent Riddle – Associate head coach/Tight ends
- Zak Hill – Offensive coordinator/Quarterbacks
- Eric Kiesau – Co-offensive coordinator/Wide receivers
- Spencer Danielson – Co-defensive coordinator/Defensive linemen
- Jeff Schmedding – Co-defensive coordinator/Inside linebackers
- Lee Marks – Special teams coordinator/Running backs
- Zac Alley – Outside linebackers
- Jalil Brown – Cornerbacks
- Brad Bedell – Offensive linemen
- Gabe Franklin – Safeties/nickels
- Jeff Pitman – Director, Strength and Conditioning
- Justus Wood – Offensive analyst
- Jeff Smart – Defensive analyst
- Kharyee Marshall – Graduate assistant
- Tre Parmalee – Graduate assistant
- Tanner Tallan – Graduate assistant
- Valerian Ume-Ezeoke – Graduate assistant
- Cody Von Appen – Graduate assistant

Legend

- (C) Team captain
- (S) Suspended
- (I) Ineligible
- Injured
- Redshirt

Roster
Last update: 8/12/23

== Game summaries ==
=== At Florida State ===
Boise State at Florida State

Team	1	2	3	4	Total
• Broncos	6	13	7	10	36
Seminoles	21	10	0	0	31

- Date: August 31, 2019
- Location: Doak Campbell Stadium
  Tallahassee, FL
- Game start: 12:06 p.m. EDT
- Elapsed time: 4:00
- Game attendance: 50,917
- Game weather: 85 °F (29 °C) • Weather: Partly cloudy • Wind: 8 MPH ENE
- Referee: Mike Defee
- TV announcers (ESPNews): Dave Pasch, Greg McElroy and Tom Luginbill (sideline)

Scoring summary
1	12:28	FSU	Cam Akers 38 Yd Run (Ricky Aguayo Kick)	FSU 0–7
1	7:49	BSU	Eric Sachse 36 Yd Field Goal	FSU 3–7
1	7:42	FSU	Tamorrion Terry 75 Yd pass from James Blackman (Ricky Aguayo Kick)	FSU 3–14
1	3:47	BSU	Eric Sachse 36 Yd Field Goal	FSU 6–14
1	1:05	FSU	Gabe Nabers 5 Yd pass from James Blackman (Ricky Aguayo Kick)	FSU 6–21
2	10:53	FSU	Ricky Aguayo 46 Yd Field Goal	FSU 6–24
2	4:34	BSU	Robert Mahone 1 Yd Run (Eric Sachse Kick)	FSU 13–24
2	4:07	FSU	Keyshawn Helton 58 Yd pass from James Blackman (Ricky Aguayo Kick)	FSU 13–31
2	2:51	BSU	Eric Sachse 41 Yd Field Goal	FSU 16–31
2	0:00	BSU	Eric Sachse 26 Yd Field Goal	FSU 19–31
3	2:50	BSU	Khalil Shakir 11 Yd pass from Hank Bachmeier (Eric Sachse Kick)	FSU 26–31
4	12:44	BSU	Robert Mahone 1 Yd Run (Eric Sachse Kick)	BSU 33–31
4	7:27	BSU	Eric Sachse 30 Yd Field Goal	BSU 36–31

Uniform Combination
Helmet	Jersey	Pants

- Passing leaders: Hank Bachmeier (BSU): 30–51, 407 YDS, 1 TD, 1 INT; James Blackman (FSU): 23–33, 327 YDS, 3 TD.
- Rushing leaders: Robert Mahone (BSU): 24 CAR, 142 YDS, 2 TD; Cam Akers (FSU): 15 CAR, 116 YDS, 1 TD.
- Receiving leaders: Khalil Shakir (BSU): 8 REC, 78 YDS, 1 TD; Tamorrion Terry (FSU): 4 REC, 99 YDS, 1 TD.

Statistics	Boise State	Florida State
First downs	38	19
Plays–yards	108–621	62–426
Rushes–yards	214	99
Passing yards	407	327
Passing: comp–att–int	30–51–1	23–34–0
Turnovers		
Time of possession	40:03	19:57

Senior kicker Eric Sachse was named the Mountain West Special Teams Co-Player of the Week (shared with Nevada kicker Brandon Talton) after going 5–5 on field goals (36, 36, 41, 26, 30) and 3–3 on PAT's to score half of Boise State's points. Sachse was also named a Lou Groza Award Star of the Week for week one. Freshman quarterback Hank Bachmeier was named the as one of the Manning Award's Stars of the Week after going 30–51 for 407, 1 TD and 1 INT in his first career start. Junior running back Robert Mahone was named to the Earl Campbell Tyler Rose Award Honorable Mention list after gaining 142 yards and 2 TDs on 24 carries.

=== Marshall ===
Marshall at Boise State

Team	1	2	3	4	Total
Thundering Herd	7	0	0	0	7
• No. 24 Broncos	0	7	7	0	14

- Date: September 6, 2019
- Location: Albertsons Stadium
  Boise, ID
- Game start: 7:01 p.m. MDT
- Elapsed time: 2:59
- Game attendance: 31,951
- Game weather: 81 °F (27 °C) • Weather: Fair • Wind: 5 MPH WNW
- Referee: Rodney Burnette
- TV announcers (ESPN2): Dave Flemming, Jim L. Mora and Paul Carcaterra (sideline)

Scoring summary
1	1:02	MAR	Brenden Knox 13 Yd Run (Justin Rohrwasser Kick)	MRSH 7–0
2	0:10	BSU	Hank Bachmeier 1 Yd Run (Eric Sachse Kick)	TIED 7–7
3	13:27	BSU	John Hightower 47 Yd pass from Hank Bachmeier (Eric Sachse Kick)	BSU 7–14

Uniform Combination
Helmet	Jersey	Pants

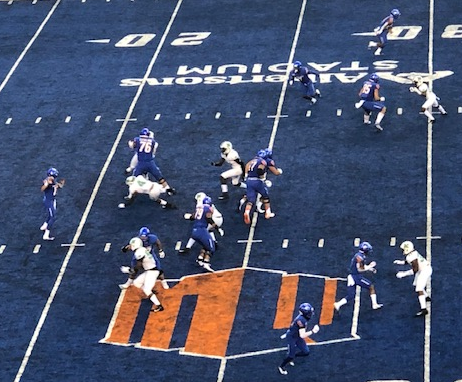
Boise State on offense

- Passing leaders: Hank Bachmeier (BSU): 22–34, 282 YDS, 1 TD, 1 INT; Isaiah Green (MAR): 10–17, 56 YDS, 1 INT.
- Rushing leaders: George Holani (BSU): 22 CAR, 103 YDS; Brenden Knox (MAR): 10 CAR, 71 YDS, 1 TD.
- Receiving leaders: Khalil Shakir (BSU): 5 REC, 95 YDS; Xavier Gaines (MAR): 3 REC, 26 YDS.

Statistics	Marshall	Boise State
First downs	9	22
Plays–yards	43–172	81–437
Rushes–yards	25–155	47–116
Passing yards	56	282
Passing: comp–att–int	10–18–1	22–34–1
Turnovers		
Time of possession	20:48	39:12

=== Portland State ===
Portland State at Boise State

Team	1	2	3	4	Total
Vikings	10	0	0	0	10
• No. 22 Broncos	14	14	10	7	45

- Date: September 14, 2019
- Location: Albertsons Stadium
  Boise, ID
- Game start: 8:20 p.m. MDT
- Elapsed time: 3:27
- Game attendance: 31,068
- Game weather: 83 °F (28 °C) • Weather: Fair • Wind: Calm
- Referee: Michael VanderVelde
- TV announcers (ESPN2): Mike Couzens and Kirk Morrison

Scoring summary
1	10:27	PSU	Cody Williams 26 Yd Field Goal	PSU 3–0
1	10:12	BSU	John Hightower 98 Yd Kick Return (Eric Sachse Kick)	BSU 3–7
1	4:13	BSU	Chase Cord 7 Yd Run (Eric Sachse Kick)	BSU 3–14
1	2:25	PSU	Mataio Talalemotu 52 Yd pass from Davis Alexander (Cody Williams Kick)	BSU 10–14
2	6:18	BSU	John Hightower 23 Yd pass from Hank Bachmeier (Eric Sachse Kick)	BSU 10–21
2	0:29	BSU	CT Thomas 9 Yd pass from Hank Bachmeier (Eric Sachse Kick)	BSU 10–28
3	8:53	BSU	CT Thomas 33 Yd pass from Chase Cord (Eric Sachse Kick)	BSU 10–35
3	5:56	BSU	Eric Sachse 33 Yd Field Goal (Eric Sachse Kick)	BSU 10–38
4	12:30	BSU	Stefan Cobbs 44 Yd pass from Chase Cord (Eric Sachse Kick)	BSU 10–45

Uniform Combination
Helmet	Jersey	Pants

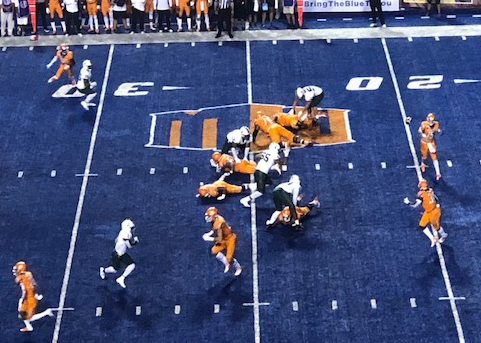
Hank Bachmeier attempting a pass to Robert Mahone.

- Passing leaders: Hank Bachmeier (BSU): 16–25, 238 YDS, 2 TD, 1 INT; Davis Alexander (PSU): 11–23, 56 YDS, 1 TD.
- Rushing leaders: Robert Mahone (BSU): 6 CAR, 59 YDS; Davis Alexander (PSU): 12 CAR, 21 YDS.
- Receiving leaders: John Hightower (BSU): 4 REC, 79 YDS, 1 TD; Mataio Talalemotu (PSU): 5 REC, 78 YDS, 1 TD.

Statistics	Portland State	Boise State
First downs	12	21
Plays–yards	63–244	68–491
Rushes–yards	111	161
Passing yards	133	330
Passing: comp–att–int	11–24–0	20–36–1
Turnovers		
Time of possession	32:25	27:35

=== Air Force ===
Air Force at Boise State

Team	1	2	3	4	Total
Falcons	0	10	3	6	19
• No. 20 Broncos	0	10	7	13	30

- Date: September 21, 2019
- Location: Albertsons Stadium
  Boise, ID
- Game start: 7:01 p.m. MDT
- Elapsed time: 2:57
- Game attendance: 36,498
- Game weather: 64 °F (18 °C) • Weather: Partly Cloudy • Wind: 9 MPH NW
- Referee: Reggie Smith
- TV announcers (ESPN2): Dave Flemming, Jim L. Mora and Paul Carcaterra (sideline)

Scoring summary
2	14:55	AFA	Donald Hammond III 8 Yd Run (Jake Koehnke Kick)	AFA 7–0
2	12:01	BSU	CT Thomas 36 Yd pass from Hank Bachmeier (Eric Sachse Kick)	TIED 7–7
2	5:53	BSU	Eric Sachse 40 Yd Field Goal	BSU 7–10
2	0:00	AFA	Jake Koehnke 30 Yd Field Goal	TIED 10–10
3	6:29	AFA	Jake Koehnke 31 Yd Field Goal	AFA 13–10
3	0:34	BSU	John Bates 28 Yd pass from Hank Bachmeier (Eric Sachse Kick)	BSU 13–17
4	8:30	BSU	Robert Mahone 10 Yd Run (Eric Sachse PAT blocked)	BSU 13–23
4	4:35	BSU	Robert Mahone 10 Yd Run (Eric Sachse Kick)	BSU 13–30
4	2:27	AFA	Geraud Sanders 31 Yd pass from Donald Hammond III (Jake Koehnke PAT blocked)	BSU 19–30

Uniform Combination
Helmet	Jersey	Pants

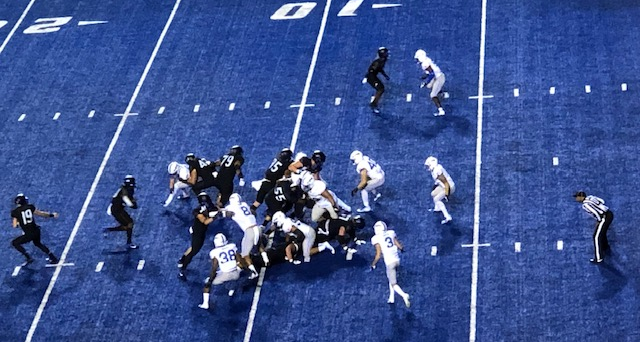
Robert Mahone during a 10 yard TD run in the 4th quarter.

- Passing leaders: Hank Bachmeier (BSU): 19–26, 263 YDS, 2 TD; Donald Hammond III (AFA): 6–11, 83 YDS, 1 TD, 1 INT.
- Rushing leaders: Robert Mahone (BSU): 13 CAR, 73 YDS, 2 TD; Taven Birdow (AFA): 18 CAR, 67 YDS.
- Receiving leaders: CT Thomas (BSU): 5 REC, 119 YDS, 1 TD; Geraud Sanders (AFA): 5 REC, 86 YDS, 1 TD.

Statistics	Air Force	Boise State
First downs	19	17
Plays–yards	64–355	57–355
Rushes–yards	242	95
Passing yards	113	260
Passing: comp–att–int	8–13–1	20–28–0
Turnovers		
Time of possession	34:12	25:48

=== At UNLV ===
Boise State at UNLV

Team	1	2	3	4	Total
• No. 16 Broncos	7	10	7	14	38
Rebels	0	0	7	6	13

- Date: October 5, 2019
- Location: Sam Boyd Stadium
  Whitney, NV
- Game start: 7:35 p.m. PDT
- Elapsed time: 3 hours and 29 minutes
- Game attendance: 24,681
- Game weather: Temperature: 79 °F (26 °C) • Weather: Clear Skies • Wind: 2 MPH NE
- Referee: Stephen Baron
- TV announcers (CBSSN): Carter Blackburn, Aaron Taylor and Jenny Dell (sideline)

Scoring summary
1	11:33	BSU	Garrett Collingham 2 Yd pass from Hank Bachmeier (Eric Sachse Kick)	BSU 7–0
2	13:38	BSU	John Hightower 76 Yd pass from Hank Bachmeier (Eric Sachse Kick)	BSU 14–0
2	0:00	BSU	Joel Velazquez 52 Yd Field Goal	BSU 17–0
3	6:40	BSU	Akilian Butler 23 Yd Run (Joel Velazquez Kick)	BSU 24–0
3	2:33	UNLV	Mekhi Stevenson 11 Yd pass from Kenyon Oblad (Daniel Gutierrez Kick)	BSU 24–7
4	5:31	BSU	Khalil Shakir 24 Yd pass from Chase Cord (Eric Sachse Kick)	BSU 31–7
4	1:23	UNLV	Darren Woods Jr. 12 Yd pass from Kenyon Oblad (Daniel Gutierrez PAT failed)	BSU 31–13
4	1:07	BSU	Andrew Van Buren 6 Yd Run (Eric Sachse Kick)	BSU 38–13

Uniform Combination
Helmet	Jersey	Pants

- Passing leaders: Hank Bachmeier (BSU): 19–30, 299 YDS, 2 TD; Kenyon Oblad (UNLV): 24–55, 262 YDS, 2 TD, 1 INT.
- Rushing leaders: George Holani (BSU): 9 CAR, 80 YDS; Charles Williams (UNLV): 11 CAR, 57 YDS.
- Receiving leaders: Khalil Shakir (BSU): 7 REC, 111 YDS, 1 TD; Darren Woods Jr. (UNLV): 5 REC, 93 YDS, 1 TD.

Statistics	Boise State	UNLV
First downs	21	22
Plays–yards	64–507	86–331
Rushes–yards	182	69
Passing yards	325	262
Passing: comp–att–int	22–26–0	24–55–1
Turnovers		
Time of possession	25:21	34:39

=== Hawaii ===
Hawaii at Boise State

Team	1	2	3	4	Total
Rainbow Warriors	7	7	7	16	37
• No. 14 Broncos	14	17	21	7	59

- Date: October 12, 2019
- Location: Albertsons Stadium
  Boise, ID
- Game start: 8:25 MDT
- Elapsed time: 3:45
- Game attendance: 36,902
- Game weather: 53 °F (12 °C) • Weather: Partly Cloudy • Wind: 5 MPH N
- Referee: Scott Campbell
- TV announcers (ESPN2): Roy Philpott, Kelly Stouffer, Lauren Sisler

Scoring summary
1	11:59	BSU	Khalil Shakir 5 Yd Run (Eric Sachse Kick)	BSU 0–7
1	8:20	BSU	John Hightower 26 Yd pass from Hank Bachmeier (Eric Sachse Kick)	BSU 0–14
1	7:23	HAW	Lincoln Victor 17 Yd pass from Cole McDonald (Ryan Meskell Kick)	BSU 7–14
2	13:46	BSU	Eric Sachse 38 Yd Field Goal	BSU 7–17
2	5:52	BSU	Khalil Shakir 33 Yd pass from Chase Cord (Eric Sachse Kick)	BSU 7–24
2	2:26	BSU	Robert Mahone 13 Yd Run (Eric Sachse Kick)	BSU 7–31
2	0:41	HAW	Melquise Stovall 21 Yd pass from Cole McDonald (Ryan Meskell Kick)	BSU 14–31
3	12:25	BSU	John Hightower 42 Yd pass from Chase Cord (Eric Sachse Kick)	BSU 14–38
3	8:24	BSU	George Holani 25 Yd pass from Jaylon Henderson (Eric Sachse Kick)	BSU 14–45
3	3:31	HAW	Cole McDonald 17 Yd Run (Ryan Meskell Kick)	BSU 21–45
3	0:00	BSU	George Holani 8 Yd pass from Chase Cord (Eric Sachse Kick)	BSU 21–52
4	10:37	HAW	Melquise Stovall 3 Yd pass from Cole McDonald (Cole McDonald Run for Two-Point Conversion)	BSU 29–52
4	2:44	HAW	Nick Mardner 50 Yd pass from Chevan Cordeiro (Melquise Stovall Run for Two-Point Conversion)	BSU 37–52
4	1:49	BSU	George Holani 40 Yd Run (Eric Sachse Kick)	BSU 37–59

Uniform Combination
Helmet	Jersey	Pants

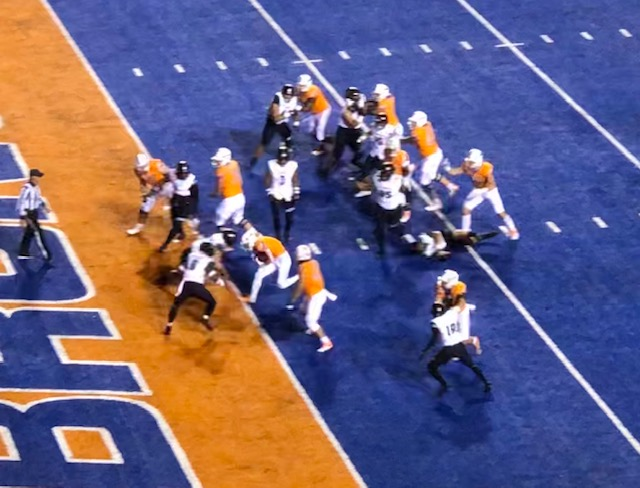
Khalil Shakir scoring a 1st quarter TD.

- Passing leaders: Chase Cord (BSU): 12–18, 175 YDS, 3 TD; Cole McDonald (HAW): 23–41, 251 YDS, 3 TD.
- Rushing leaders: Robert Mahone (BSU): 18 CAR, 74 YDS, 1 TD; Cole McDonald (HAW): 8 CAR, 54 YDS, 1 TD.
- Receiving leaders: John Hightower (BSU): 7 REC, 141 YDS, 2 TD; Melquise Stovall (HAW): 8 REC, 114 YDS, 2 TD.

Statistics	Hawaii	Boise State
First downs	24	29
Plays–yards	69–438	76–518
Rushes–yards	19–113	39–203
Passing yards	325	315
Passing: comp–att–int	26–50–1	21–37–0
Turnovers		
Time of possession	27:11	32:42

=== At BYU ===
Boise State at BYU

Team	1	2	3	4	Total
No. 14 Broncos	7	3	0	15	25
• Cougars	7	0	21	0	28

- Date: October 19, 2019
- Location: LaVell Edwards Stadium
  Provo, UT
- Game start: 8:25 p.m. MDT
- Elapsed time: 3:25
- Game attendance: 58,930
- Game weather: 41 °F (5 °C) • Weather: Mostly Cloudy w/ Rain and Possible Snow Flurries • Wind: 8 MPH N
- Referee: Kevin Hassell
- TV announcers (ESPN2): Clay Matvick, Ryan Leaf, Taylor McGregor

Scoring summary
1	10:28	BSU	CT Thomas 12 Yd Run (Eric Sachse Kick)	BSU 7–0
1	3:34	BYU	Lopini Katoa 4 Yd Run (Jake Oldroyd Kick)	TIED 7–7
2	0:28	BSU	Eric Sachse 38 Yd Field Goal	BSU 10–7
3	13:03	BYU	Sione Finau 46 Yd Run (Jake Oldroyd Kick)	BYU 10–14
3	4:49	BYU	Matt Bushman 27 Yd pass from Baylor Romney (Jake Oldroyd Kick)	BYU 10–21
3	3:10	BYU	Matt Bushman 39 Yd pass from Baylor Romney (Jake Oldroyd Kick)	BYU 10–28
4	12:42	BSU	Octavius Evans 13 Yd pass from Chase Cord (Chase Cord Pass to Garrett Collingham for Two-Point Conversion)	BYU 18–28
4	3:17	BSU	Akilian Butler 5 Yd pass from Chase Cord (Eric Sachse Kick)	BYU 25–28

Uniform Combination
Helmet	Jersey	Pants

- Passing leaders: Chase Cord (BSU): 18–30, 185 YDS, 2 TD, 2 INT; Baylor Romney (BYU) 15–26, 221 YDS, 2 TD.
- Rushing leaders: George Holani (BSU): 20 CAR, 97 YDS; Sione Finau (BYU) 11 CAR, 89 YDS, 1 TD.
- Receiving leaders: Octavius Evans (BSU) 5 REC, 77 YDS, 1 TD; Matt Bushman (BYU) 5 REC, 101 YDS, 2 TD.

Statistics	Boise State	BYU
First downs	25	16
Plays–yards	72–359	61–342
Rushes–yards	40–174	35–121
Passing yards	185	221
Passing: comp–att–int	18–32–2	15–26–0
Turnovers		
Time of possession	30:26	29:34

=== At San Jose State ===
Boise State at San Jose State

Team	1	2	3	4	Total
• No. 21 Broncos	7	10	14	21	52
Spartans	14	10	10	8	42

- Date: November 2, 2019
- Location: CEFCU Stadium
  San Jose, CA
- Game start: 7:38 p.m. PDT
- Elapsed time: 3:42
- Game attendance: 19,184
- Game weather: Temperature: 65 °F (18 °C) • Weather: Fair • Wind: 3 MPH W
- Referee: Cal McNeill
- TV announcers (CBSSN): Carter Blackburn, Aaron Taylor and Jenny Dell (sideline)

Scoring summary
1	10:58	SJSU	DeJon Packer 1 Yd Run (Matt Mercurio Kick)	SJSU 0–7
1	3:26	SJSU	Josh Love 4 Yd Run (Matt Mercurio Kick)	SJSU 0–14
1	0:15	BSU	Avery Williams 66 Yd punt return (Eric Sachse Kick)	SJSU 7–14
2	12:01	SJSU	Matt Mercurio 35 Yd Field Goal	SJSU 7–17
2	7:58	BSU	George Holani 1 Yd Run (Eric Sachse Kick)	SJSU 14–17
2	1:13	SJSU	Isaia Hamilton 16 Yd pass from Josh Love (Matt Mercurio Kick)	SJSU 14–24
2	0:24	BSU	Eric Sachse 30 Yd Field Goal	SJSU 17–24
3	10:27	SJSU	Matt Mercurio 35 Yd Field Goal	SJSU 17–27
3	9:13	BSU	George Holani 6 Yd Run (Eric Sachse Kick)	SJSU 24–27
3	3:28	BSU	Chase Cord 8 Yd Run (Eric Sachse Kick)	BSU 31–27
3	0:53	SJSU	DeJon Packer 3 Yd Run (Matt Mercurio Kick)	SJSU 31–34
4	11:31	BSU	George Holani 6 Yd Run (Eric Sachse Kick)	BSU 38–34
4	6:24	BSU	Andrew Van Buren 32 Yd Run (Eric Sachse Kick)	BSU 45–34
4	3:56	SJSU	Bailey Gaither 9 Yd pass from Josh Love (Tre Walker pass From Josh Love)	BSU 45–42
4	1:35	BSU	George Holani 8 Yd Run (Eric Sachse Kick)	BSU 52–42

Uniform Combination
Helmet	Jersey	Pants

- Passing leaders: Hank Bachmeier (BSU): 13–17, 299 YDS, 1 INT; Josh Love (SJSU): 29–53, 438 YDS, 2 TD, 1 INT.
- Rushing leaders: George Holani (BSU): 28 CAR, 134 YDS, 4 TD; Kaire Robinson (SJSU): 9 CAR, 46 YDS.
- Receiving leaders: John Hightower (BSU): 5 REC, 129 YDS; Tre Walker (SJSU): 9 REC, 193 YDS.

Statistics	Boise State	San Jose State
First downs	23	28
Plays–yards	68–466	75–497
Rushes–yards	253	59
Passing yards	213	438
Passing: comp–att–int	13–17–1	29–53–1
Turnovers		
Time of possession	32:08	27:52

=== Wyoming ===
Wyoming at Boise State

Team	1	2	3	4	OT	Total
Cowboys	0	10	7	0	0	17
• No. 21 Broncos	7	0	3	7	3	20

- Date: November 9, 2019
- Location: Albertsons Stadium
  Boise, ID
- Game start: 8:20 p.m. MST
- Elapsed time: 3:32
- Game attendance: 33,018
- Game weather: Temperature: 43 °F (6 °C) • Weather: Clear and cool • Wind: Calm
- Referee: Brad Van Vark
- TV announcers (ESPN): Roy Philpott, Kelly Stouffer

Scoring summary
1	2:05	BSU	Akilian Butler 5 Yd pass from Chase Cord (Eric Sachse Kick)	BSU 0–7
2	WYO	4:57	Tyler Vander Waal 3 Yd Run (Cooper Rothe Kick)	TIED 7–7
2	WYO	0:01	Cooper Rothe 39 Yd Field Goal	WYO 10–7
3	BSU	9:18	Eric Sachse 40 Yd Field Goal	TIED 10–10
3	WYO	2:35	Xazavian Valladay 21 Yd Run (Cooper Rothe Kick)	WYO 10–17
4	BSU	5:37	Khalil Shakir 5 Yd Run (Eric Sachse Kick)	TIED 17–17
OT	BSU		Eric Sachse 28 Yd Field Goal	BSU 17–20

Uniform Combination
Helmet	Jersey	Pants

- Passing leaders: Chase Cord (BSU): 19–30, 190 YDS, 1 TD, 1 INT; Tyler Vander Waal (WYO): 15–23, 160 YDS.
- Rushing leaders: George Holani (BSU): 11 CAR, 30 YDS; Xazavian Valladay (WYO): 37 CAR, 124 YDS, 1 TD.
- Receiving leaders: Khalil Shakir (BSU): 7 REC, 70 YDS; Josh Harshman (WYO): 6 REC, 48 YDS.

Statistics	Wyoming	Boise State
First downs	15	15
Plays–yards	67–283	59–285
Rushes–yards	44–123	28–91
Passing yards	160	194
Passing: comp–att–int	15–23–1	20–31–1
Turnovers		
Time of possession	32:28	27:32

=== New Mexico ===
New Mexico at Boise State

Team	1	2	3	4	Total
Lobos	0	0	3	6	9
• No. 19 Broncos	28	0	14	0	42

- Date: November 16, 2019
- Location: Albertsons Stadium
  Boise, ID
- Game start: 8:20 p.m. MST
- Elapsed time: 3:18
- Game attendance: 31,492
- Game weather: Temperature: 43 °F (6 °C) • Weather: Mostly Clear • Wind: 3 MPH NE
- Referee: Stephen Baron
- TV announcers (ESPN2): Mike Corey, Rene Ingoglia

Scoring summary
1	14:51	BSU	Sonatane Lui 24 Yd fumble return (Eric Sachse Kick)	BSU 0–7
1	7:53	BSU	Octavius Evans 17 Yd Run (Eric Sachse Kick)	BSU 0–14
1	3:24	BSU	Khalil Shakir 18 Yd pass from Jaylon Henderson (Eric Sachse Kick)	BSU 0–21
1	0:07	BSU	John Hightower 51 Yd pass from Jaylon Henderson (Eric Sachse Kick)	BSU 0–28
3	9:17	UNM	Andrew Shelley 40 Yd Field Goal	BSU 3–28
3	3:03	BSU	Andrew Van Buren 8 Yd pass from Jaylon Henderson (Eric Sachse Kick)	BSU 3–35
3	0:00	BSU	Garrett Collingham 2 Yd pass from Khalil Shakir (Eric Sachse Kick)	BSU 3–42
4	3:53	UNM	Micah Gray 1 Yd Run (Andrew Shelley Kick Missed)	BSU 9–42

Uniform Combination
Helmet	Jersey	Pants

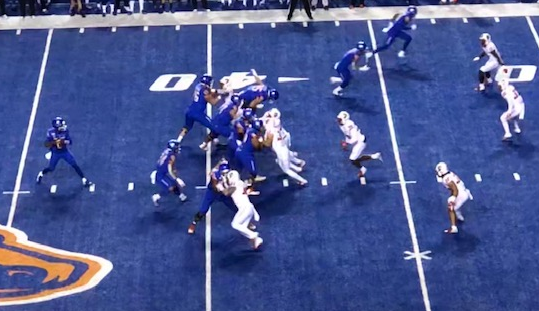
Boise State on offense.

- Passing leaders: Jaylon Henderson (BSU): 15–28, 292 YDS, 3 TD, 1 INT; Tevaka Tuioti (UNM): 14–21, 175 YDS.
- Rushing leaders: George Holani (BSU): 7 CAR, 73 YDS; Kentrail Moran (UNM): 10 CAR, 30 YDS.
- Receiving leaders: John Hightower (BSU): 4 REC, 124 YDS, 1 TD; Emmanuel Logan-Greene (UNM): 6 REC, 60 YDS.

Statistics	New Mexico	Boise State
First downs	16	23
Plays–yards	67–292	66–509
Rushes–yards	45–117	37–215
Passing yards	175	294
Passing: comp–att–int	14–22–0	16–29–1
Turnovers		
Time of possession	31:51	28:09

=== At Utah State ===
Boise State at Utah State

Team	1	2	3	4	Total
• No. 20 Broncos	21	21	14	0	56
Aggies	7	0	7	7	21

- Date: November 23, 2019
- Location: Maverik Stadium
  Logan, UT
- Game start: 8:40 p.m. MST
- Elapsed time: 3:27
- Game attendance: 18,315
- Game weather: Temperature: 33 °F (1 °C) • Weather: Clear • Wind: 2 MPH S
- Referee: David Alvarez
- TV announcers (CBSSN): Carter Blackburn, Aaron Taylor

Scoring summary
1	13:21	BSU	John Hightower 30 Yd pass from Jaylon Henderson (Eric Sachse Kick)	BSU 7–0
1	7:28	USU	Caleb Repp 7 Yd pass from Jordan Love (Dominik Eberle Kick)	TIED 7–7
1	5:14	BSU	Jalen Walker 15 Yd interception return (Eric Sachse Kick)	BSU 14–7
1	1:20	BSU	George Holani 5 Yd Run (Eric Sachse Kick)	BSU 21–7
2	11:50	BSU	George Holani 1 Yd Run (Eric Sachse Kick)	BSU 28–7
2	6:11	BSU	Robert Mahone 1 Yd Run (Eric Sachse Kick)	BSU 35–7
2	0:19	BSU	Khalil Shakir 14 Yd pass from Jaylon Henderson	BSU 42–7
3	12:28	BSU	Avery Williams 74 Yd punt return (Eric Sachse Kick)	BSU 49–7
3	4:32	BSU	CT Thomas 15 Yd pass from Jaylon Henderson	BSU 56–7
3	0:27	USU	Gerold Bright 6 Yd Run (Dominik Eberle Kick)	BSU 56–14
4	1:40	USU	Henry Colombi 2 Yd Run (Dominik Eberle Kick)	BSU 56–21

Uniform Combination
Helmet	Jersey	Pants

- Passing leaders: Jaylon Henderson (BSU): 16–28, 187 YDS, 3 TD; Jordan Love (USU): 21–36, 229 YDS, 1 TD, 1 INT.
- Rushing leaders: George Holani (BSU): 16 CAR, 178 YDS, 2 TD; Gerold Bright (USU): 10 CAR, 44 YDS, 1 TD.
- Receiving leaders: John Hightower (BSU): 3 REC, 56 YDS, 1 TD; Siaosi Mariner (USU): 4 REC, 66 YDS.

Statistics	Boise State	Utah State
First downs	27	20
Plays–yards	75–484	81–428
Rushes–yards	46–297	34–121
Passing yards	187	307
Passing: comp–att–int	16–29–0	27–47–2
Turnovers		
Time of possession	33:26	26:34

=== At Colorado State ===
Boise State at Colorado State

Team	1	2	3	4	Total
• No. 20 Broncos	7	17	0	7	31
Rams	7	7	7	3	24

- Date: November 29, 2019
- Location: Canvas Stadium
  Fort Collins, CO
- Game start: 1:37 p.m. MST
- Elapsed time: 3:19
- Game attendance: 12,324
- Game weather: 24 °F (−4 °C) • Weather: Overcast, Cold • Wind: 10 MPH NW
- Referee: M. VanderVelde
- TV announcers (CBSSN): Rich Waltz, Aaron Murray

Scoring summary
1	11:12	CSU	Jaylen Thomas 3 Yd Run (Braxton Davis Kick)	CSU 0–7
1	2:34	BSU	Garrett Collingham 2 Yd Run (Eric Sachse Kick)	TIED 7–7
2	14:55	BSU	CT Thomas 5 Yd pass from Jaylon Henderson (Eric Sachse Kick)	BSU 14–7
2	8:47	CSU	Warren Jackson 16 Yd pass from Patrick O'Brien (Braxton Davis Kick)	TIED 14–14
2	1:16	BSU	Garrett Collingham 3 Yd pass from Jaylon Henderson (Eric Sachse Kick)	BSU 21–14
2	0:18	BSU	Eric Sachse 39 Yd Field Goal	BSU 24–14
3	3:49	CSU	Trey McBride 28 Yd pass from Patrick O'Brien (Braxton Davis Kick)	BSU 24–21
4	11:26	BSU	Jaylon Henderson 1 Yd Run (Eric Sachse Kick)	BSU 31–21
4	8:02	CSU	Braxton Davis 34 Yd Field Goal	BSU 31–24

Uniform Combination
Helmet	Jersey	Pants

- Passing leaders: Jaylon Henderson (BSU): 26–36, 253 YDS, 2 TD; Patrick O'Brien (CSU): 26–40, 175 YDS.
- Rushing leaders: George Holani (BSU): 18 CAR, 42 YDS; Kentrail Moran (CSU): 9 CAR, 36 YDS, 1 TD.
- Receiving leaders: John Hightower (BSU): 7 REC, 103 YDS; Trey McBride (CSU): 9 REC, 101 YDS, 1 TD.

Statistics	Boise State	Colorado State
First downs	20	20
Plays–yards	73–344	60–379
Rushes–yards	37–91	20–90
Passing yards	253	289
Passing: comp–att–int	26–36–0	26–40–2
Turnovers		
Time of possession	36:24	23:36

=== Hawaii (Mountain West Championship game) ===
Hawaii at Boise State
(Mountain West Championship Game)

Team	1	2	3	4	Total
Rainbow Warriors	3	0	0	7	10
• No. 19 Broncos	3	14	14	0	31

- Date: December 7, 2019
- Location: Albertsons Stadium, Boise, ID
- Game start: 2:03 p.m. MST
- Elapsed time: 3:12
- Game attendance: 23,561
- Game weather: 48 °F (9 °C) • Weather: Mostly Cloudy • Wind: 10 MPH SE
- Referee: C. Castleberry
- TV announcers (ESPN): Roy Philpott (play-by-play), Kelly Stouffer (analyst) & Lauren Sisler (sideline)

Scoring summary
1	6:44	HAW	Ryan Meskell 47 Yd Field Goal	HAW 3–0
1	0:30	BSU	Eric Sachse 34 Yd Field Goal	TIED 3–3
2	1:07	BSU	Khalil Shakir 36 Yd pass from Jaylon Henderson (Eric Sachse Kick)	BSU 3–10
2	0:14	BSU	John Hightower 36 Yd pass from Jaylon Henderson (Eric Sachse Kick)	BSU 3–17
3	1:09	BSU	Khalil Shakir 4 Yd Run (Eric Sachse Kick)	BSU 3–24
3	0:18	BSU	Jaylon Henderson 5 Yd Run (Eric Sachse Kick)	BSU 3–31
4	12:00	HAW	Miles Reed 21 Yd Run (Ryan Meskell Kick)	BSU 10–31

Uniform Combination
Helmet	Jersey	Pants

- Passing leaders: Jaylon Henderson (BSU): 20–29, 212 YDS, 2 TD, 1 INT; Cole McDonald (HAW): 20–36, 241 YDS, 1 INT.
- Rushing leaders: George Holani (BSU): 16 CAR, 67 YDS; Miles Reed (HAW): 12 CAR, 87 YDS, 1 TD.
- Receiving leaders: Khalil Shakir (BSU): 7 REC, 89 YDS, 1 TD; Jason-Matthew Sharsh (HAW): 7 REC, 74 YDS.

Statistics	Hawaii	Boise State
First downs	16	20
Plays–yards	62–320	68–364
Rushes–yards	26–79	37–144
Passing yards	241	220
Passing: comp–att–int	20–36–1	21–31–1
Turnovers		
Time of possession	27:53	32:07

=== Vs. Washington (Las Vegas Bowl) ===
Washington vs. No. 19 Boise State
(Las Vegas Bowl)

Team	1	2	3	4	Total
No. 19 Broncos	0	0	7	0	7
• Huskies	7	10	7	14	38

- Date: December 21, 2019
- Location: Sam Boyd Stadium, Whitney, NV
- Game start: 5:30 pm
- Elapsed time: 3:11
- Game attendance: 34,197
- Game weather: 55 °F (13 °C) • Weather: Mostly Sunny • Wind: 4 MPH NE
- Referee: Rodney Burnette
- TV announcers (ABC): Bob Wischusen (play-by-play), Kirk Herbstreit (color), Molly McGrath (sideline)

Scoring summary
1	5:32	WASH	Andre Baccellia 17 Yd pass from Jacob Eason (Peyton Henry Kick)	WASH 0–7
2	6:46	WASH	Salvon Ahmed 8 Yd Run (Peyton Henry Kick)	WASH 0–14
2	0:00	WASH	Peyton Henry 32 Yd Field Goal	WASH 0–17
3	10:22	WASH	Richard Newton 2 Yd Run (Peyton Henry Kick)	WASH 0–24
3	4:44	BSU	George Holani 10 Yd pass from Jaylon Henderson (Eric Sachse Kick)	WASH 7–24
4	10:44	BSU	Terrell Bynum 13 Yd pass from Richard Newton (Peyton Henry Kick)	WASH 7–31
4	2:29	HAW	Salvon Ahmed 12 Yd Run (Peyton Henry Kick)	WASH 7–38

Uniform Combination
Helmet	Jersey	Pants

- Passing leaders: Hank Bachmeier (BSU): 15–26, 119 YDS, 2 INT; Jacob Eason (WASH): 23–33, 210 YDS, 1 TD.
- Rushing leaders: George Holani (BSU): 11 CAR, 35 YDS; Richard Newton (WASH): 15 CAR, 69 YDS, 1 TD.
- Receiving leaders: Khalil Shakir (BSU): 3 REC, 38 YDS; Terrell Bynum (WASH): 5 REC, 67 YDS, 1 TD.

Statistics	Boise State	Washington
First downs	16	22
Plays–yards	59–266	68–341
Rushes–yards	78	118
Passing yards	188	223
Passing: comp–att–int	21–37–2	23–33–0
Turnovers		
Time of possession	25:54	34:06

== Rankings ==
Ranking movements Legend: ██ Increase in ranking ██ Decrease in ranking RV = Received votes
	Week																
Poll	Pre	1	2	3	4	5	6	7	8	9	10	11	12	13	14	15	Final
AP	RV	24	22	20	16	16	14	14	22	21	21	19	20	20	19	18	23
Coaches	RV	24	22	20	15	15	14	13	21	21	21	19	19	19	17	18	22
CFP	Not released										22	21	20	20	19	19	Not released

== Players drafted into the NFL ==
Round	Pick	Player	Position	NFL club
2	58	Ezra Cleveland	OT	Minnesota Vikings
5	164	Curtis Weaver	DE	Miami Dolphins
5	168	John Hightower	WR	Philadelphia Eagles
