= 2019 Las Vegas Bowl =

Postseason college football bowl game

2019 Mitsubishi Motors Las Vegas Bowl
- 28th Las Vegas Bowl
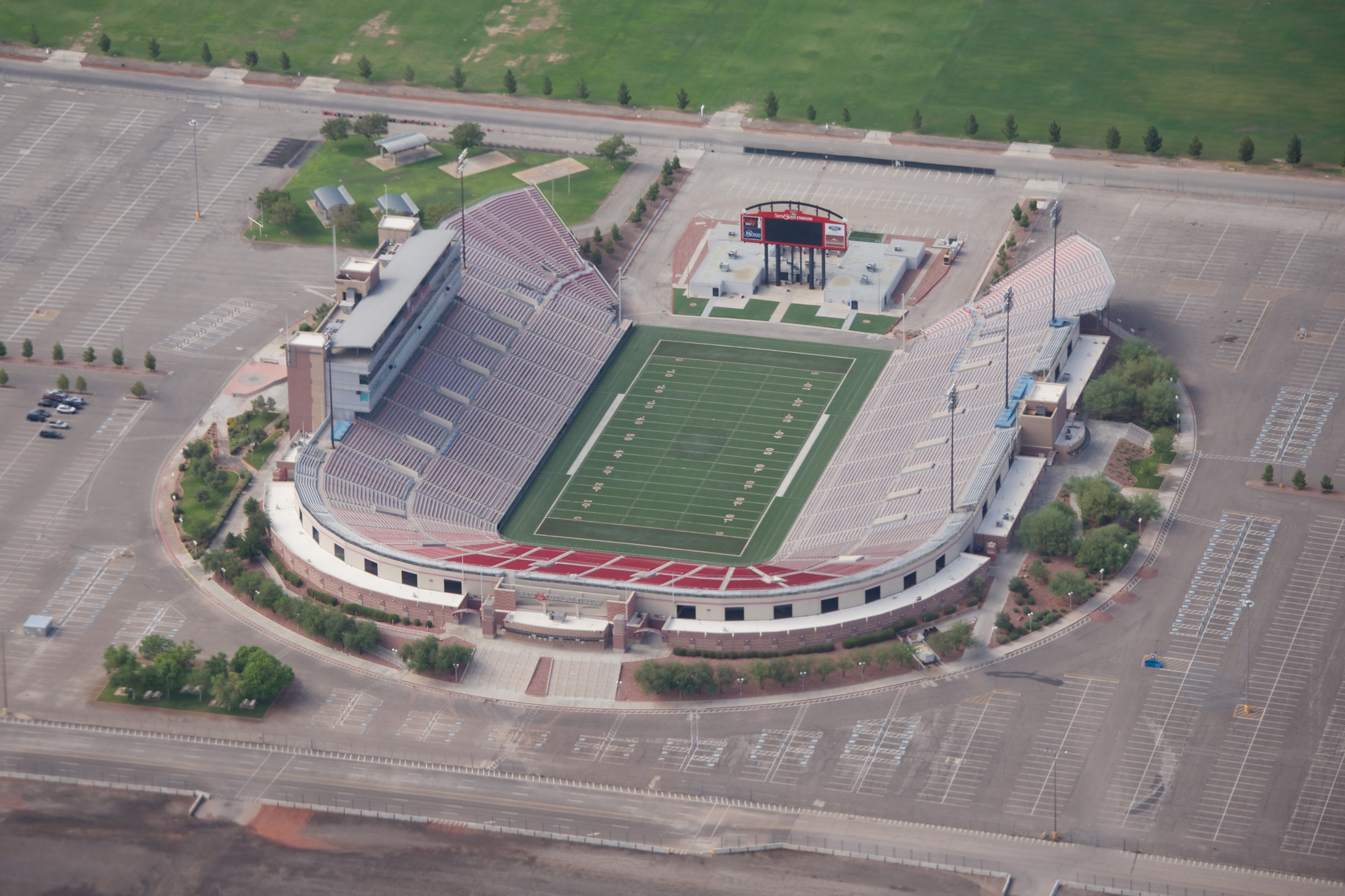
- Sam Boyd Stadium in Whitney, Nevada, hosted the Las Vegas Bowl for the final time before being moved to Allegiant Stadium two years later.
Boise State Broncos	Washington Huskies
(12–1)	(7–5)
Mountain West	Pac-12
7	38
Head coach: Bryan Harsin	Head coach: Chris Petersen
AP / Coaches / CFP; 18 / 18 / 19
	1	2	3	4	Total
Boise State	0	0	7	0	7
Washington	7	10	7	14	38
- Date: December 21, 2019
- Season: 2019
- Stadium: Sam Boyd Stadium
- Location: Whitney, Nevada
- MVP: Elijah Molden (DB, Washington)
- Favorite: Washington by 3.5
- Referee: Rodney Burnette (C-USA)
- Halftime show: Blue Thunder Marching Band; University of Washington Husky Marching Band
- Attendance: 34,197
- Payout: US$2,900,000

United States TV coverage
- Network: ABC
- Announcers: Bob Wischusen (play-by-play); Kirk Herbstreit (analyst); Molly McGrath (sideline)
- Nielsen ratings: 1.6 (2.64 million viewers)

The 2019 Las Vegas Bowl was a college football bowl game played on December 21, 2019, with kickoff at 7:30 p.m. EST (4:30 p.m. local PST) on ABC. It was the 28th edition of the Las Vegas Bowl, and one of the 2019–20 bowl games concluding the 2019 FBS football season. Sponsored by automotive manufacturer Mitsubishi Motors, the game was officially known as the Mitsubishi Motors Las Vegas Bowl.

This was the last edition of the Las Vegas Bowl played at Sam Boyd Stadium, the venue of the game since its inception in 1992, as the bowl will move to Allegiant Stadium in nearby Paradise for the 2020 playing. This was also the last edition to have a conference tie-in with Mountain West, as starting with the 2020 playing, the bowl's tie-ins will be structured to feature a Pac-12 team against either a Big Ten team or SEC team.

== Teams ==
The game was played between the Boise State Broncos, champions of the Mountain West Conference, and the Washington Huskies of the Pac-12 Conference. It was a rematch of the 2012 Maaco Bowl Las Vegas, which saw Boise State defeat Washington, 28–26. This was the fifth overall meeting between Boise State and Washington; the teams split their prior four meetings, 2–2.

=== Boise State Broncos ===
Boise State finished atop the Mountain Division of Mountain West, then defeated Hawaii in the Mountain West Championship Game, 31–10. The Broncos entered the bowl with a record of 12–1 (8–0 in conference), ranked 18th in the AP Poll.

=== Washington Huskies ===
Washington entered the bowl with a record of 7–5 (4–5 in conference). The Huskies finished in a three-way tie for second place in the North Division of the Pac-12.

== Game summary ==
2019 Mitsubishi Motors Las Vegas Bowl

Quarter	1	2	3	4	Total
No. 19 Boise State	0	0	7	0	7
Washington	7	10	7	14	38

at Sam Boyd Stadium • Whitney, Nevada

- Date: Saturday, December 21, 2019
- Game time: 7:30 p.m. EST (4:30 p.m. PST)
- Game weather: Mostly sunny • Temperature: 55 °F (13 °C) • Wind: NE 4 mph
- Game attendance: 34,197
- Referee: Rodney Burnette
- TV announcers (ABC): Bob Wischusen (play-by-play), Kirk Herbstreit (color), and Molly McGrath (sideline)
- ESPN game summary

Game information

First Quarter

- (5:32) WASH – Jacob Eason 17 yard pass to Andre Baccellia, Peyton Henry kick (Drive: 12 plays, 52 yards, 6:07; Washington 7–0)

Second Quarter

- (6:46) WASH – Salvon Ahmed 8 yard rush, Peyton Henry kick (Drive: 13 plays, 74 yards, 5:53; Washington 14–0)
- (0:00) WASH – Peyton Henry 32 yard field goal (Drive: 4 plays, 41 yards, 0:23; Washington 17–0)

Third Quarter

- (10:22) WASH – Richard Newton 2 yard rush, Peyton Henry kick (Drive: 3 plays, 24 yards, 0:49; Washington 24–0)
- (4:44) BSU – Jaylon Henderson 10 yard pass to George Holani, Eric Sachse kick (Drive: 11 plays, 77 yards, 5:30; Washington 24–7)

Fourth Quarter

- (10:44) WASH – Richard Newton 13 yard pass to Terrell Bynum, Peyton Henry kick (Drive: 6 plays, 60 yards, 3:27; Washington 31–7)
- (2:29) WASH – Salvon Ahmed 12 yard rush, Peyton Henry kick (Drive: 11 plays, 55 yards, 7:39; Washington 38–7)

=== Statistics ===
Statistics	BSU	WASH
First downs	16	22
Plays–yards	59–266	68–341
Rushes–yards	22–78	35–118
Passing yards	188	223
Passing: comp–att–int	21–37–2	23–33–0
Time of possession	25:54	34:06

Team	Category	Player	Statistics
Boise State	Passing	Hank Bachmeier	15/26, 119 yards, 2 INT
Boise State	Rushing	George Holani	11 carries, 35 yards
Boise State	Receiving	Khalil Shakir	3 receptions, 38 yards
Washington	Passing	Jacob Eason	22/32, 210 yards, 1 TD
Washington	Rushing	Richard Newton	15 carries, 69 yards, 1 TD
Washington	Receiving	Terrell Bynum	5 receptions, 67 yards, 1 TD
