= 2019 New Mexico Lobos football team =

American college football season

2019 New Mexico Lobos football
- Conference: Mountain West Conference
- Mountain Division
- Record: 2–10 (0–8 MW)
- Head coach: Bob Davie (8th season)
- Offensive coordinator: Joe Dailey (1st season)
- Offensive scheme: Flexbone option
- Defensive coordinator: Jordan Peterson (1st season)
- Base defense: 4–3
- Home stadium: Dreamstyle Stadium

Uniform
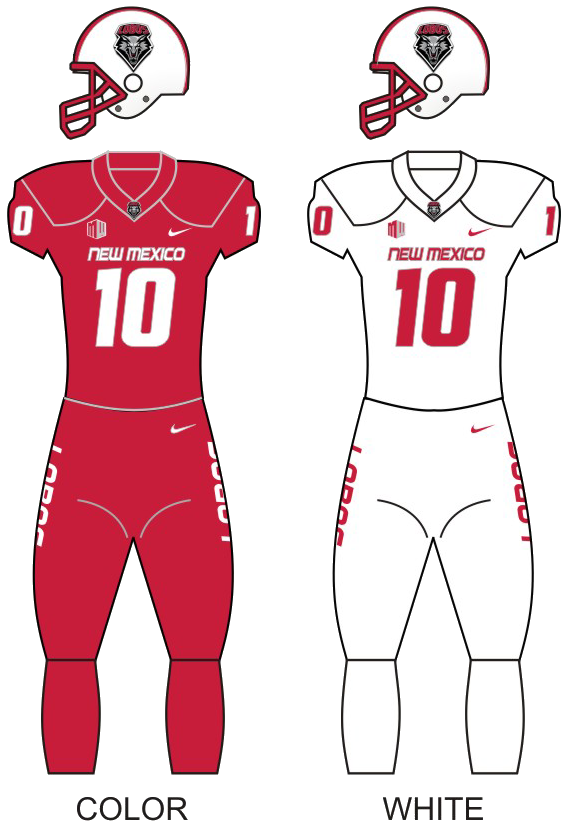

2019 Mountain West Conference football standings
	Conf.			Overall
Team	W		L	W		L
Mountain Division
No. 23 Boise State xy$	8	–	0	12	–	2
No. 22 Air Force	7	–	1	11	–	2
Utah State	6	–	2	7	–	6
Wyoming	4	–	4	8	–	5
Colorado State	3	–	5	4	–	8
New Mexico	0	–	8	2	–	10
West Division
Hawaii xy	5	–	3	10	–	5
San Diego State x	5	–	3	10	–	3
Nevada	4	–	4	7	–	6
San Jose State	2	–	6	5	–	7
UNLV	2	–	6	4	–	8
Fresno State	2	–	6	4	–	8
Championship: Boise State 31, Hawaii 10
$ – Conference champion; x – Division champion/co-champions; y – Championship game participant; Rankings from AP Poll

The 2019 New Mexico Lobos football team represented the University of New Mexico as a member of the Mountain Division in the Mountain West Conference (MW) during the 2019 NCAA Division I FBS football season. Led by Bob Davie in his eighth and final season as head coach, the Lobos compiled an overall record of 2–10 with a mark of 0–8 in conference play, placing last out of six teams in the MW's Mountain Division. The team played home games at Dreamstyle Stadium in Albuquerque, New Mexico.

On November 25, Davie and New Mexico agreed to part ways. He finished at New Mexico with an eight-year record of 35–64.

== Schedule ==
Date	Time	Opponent	Site	TV	Result	Attendance
August 31	4:00 p.m.	No. 23 (FCS) Sam Houston State*	Dreamstyle Stadium; Albuquerque, NM	LOBOTV	W 39–31	13,749
September 14	12:30 p.m.	at No. 7 Notre Dame*	Notre Dame Stadium; Notre Dame, IN	NBC	L 14–66	77,622
September 21	2:30 p.m.	New Mexico State*	Dreamstyle Stadium; Albuquerque, NM (Rio Grande Rivalry)	ATTSNRM	W 55–52	27,269
September 28	4:00 p.m.	at Liberty*	Williams Stadium; Lynchburg, VA	ESPN+	L 10–17	17,101
October 4	8:00 p.m.	at San Jose State	CEFCU Stadium; San Jose, CA	CBSSN	L 21–32	16,119
October 11	6:00 p.m.	Colorado State	Dreamstyle Stadium; Albuquerque, NM	CBSSN	L 21–35	15,393
October 19	2:00 p.m.	at Wyoming	War Memorial Stadium; Laramie, WY	ATTSNRM	L 10–23	22,884
October 26	2:00 p.m.	Hawaii^{†}	Dreamstyle Stadium; Albuquerque, NM	SPEC HI	L 31–45	12,617
November 2	8:30 p.m.	at Nevada	Mackay Stadium; Reno, NV	ESPNU	L 10–21	15,631
November 16	8:15 p.m.	at No. 21 Boise State	Albertsons Stadium; Boise, ID	ESPN2	L 9–42	31,492
November 23 (Note: The game between New Mexico and Air Force, originally scheduled for November 9, was rescheduled to November 23 due to the death of New Mexico player Nahje Flowers.)	12:00 p.m.	Air Force	Dreamstyle Stadium; Albuquerque, NM	ESPN3	L 22–44	13,844
November 30	2:00 p.m.	Utah State	Dreamstyle Stadium; Albuquerque, NM	Stadium on Facebook	L 25–38	11,611
*Non-conference game; ^{†}Homecoming; Rankings from AP Poll released prior to the game; All times are in Mountain time

== Preseason ==
=== Mountain West media days ===
The 2019 Mountain West Media days were held on July 23–24 at the Cosmopolitan on the Las Vegas Strip

==== Media poll ====
The preseason poll was released at the Mountain West media days on July 23, 2019. The Lobos were predicted to finish in sixth place in the MW Mountain Division.

== Game summaries ==
=== No. 23 (FCS) Sam Houston State ===
	1	2	3	4	Total
No. 23 (FCS) Bearkats	0	16	7	8	31
Lobos	13	9	10	7	39

Statistics	SHSU	UNM
First downs	27	20
Total yards	558	485
Rushing yards	115	145
Passing yards	443	340
Turnovers	1	0
Time of possession	33:48	26:12

Team	Category	Player	Statistics
Sam Houston State	Passing	Ty Brock	21/38, 258 yards, TD
Sam Houston State	Rushing	Kyran Jackson	15 rushes, 66 yards
Sam Houston State	Receiving	Dee Bowens	9 receptions, 130 yards, TD
New Mexico	Passing	Brandt Hughes	12/29, 218 yards
New Mexico	Rushing	Ahmari Davis	16 rushes, 107 yards, 2 TD
New Mexico	Receiving	Anu Somoye	3 receptions, 62 yards

Bob Davie experienced heart problems following the victory, forcing him to cancel the post-game press conference. On September 5, run game coordinator/offensive line coach Saga Tuitele was named acting head coach.

=== At No. 7 Notre Dame ===
	1	2	3	4	Total
Lobos	0	7	0	7	14
No. 7 Fighting Irish	7	31	14	14	66

Statistics	UNM	ND
First downs	22	25
Total yards	363	591
Rushing yards	212	157
Passing yards	151	434
Turnovers	4	0
Time of possession	35:06	24:54

Team	Category	Player	Statistics
New Mexico	Passing	Tevaka Tuioti	6/13, 132 yards
New Mexico	Rushing	Bryson Carroll	6 rushes, 69 yards, TD
New Mexico	Receiving	Aaron Molina	2 receptions, 79 yards
Notre Dame	Passing	Ian Book	15/24, 360 yards, 4 TD
Notre Dame	Rushing	Ian Book	9 rushes, 46 yards, TD
Notre Dame	Receiving	Chase Claypool	4 receptions, 96 yards, TD

=== New Mexico State ===
	1	2	3	4	Total
Aggies	17	14	7	14	52
Lobos	14	17	17	7	55

Statistics	NMSU	UNM
First downs	29	27
Total yards	489	598
Rushing yards	154	243
Passing yards	335	355
Turnovers	1	1
Time of possession	26:54	33:06

Team	Category	Player	Statistics
New Mexico State	Passing	Josh Adkins	30/47, 335 yards, 3 TD, INT
New Mexico State	Rushing	Jason Huntley	12 rushes, 114 yards, TD
New Mexico State	Receiving	Naveon Mitchell	4 receptions, 105 yards
New Mexico	Passing	Tevaka Tuioti	16/28, 355 yards, 3 TD, INT
New Mexico	Rushing	Ahmari Davis	28 rushes, 133 yards, 2 TD
New Mexico	Receiving	Jordan Kress	3 receptions, 122 yards, 2 TD

=== At Liberty ===
	1	2	3	4	Total
Lobos	0	3	0	7	10
Flames	7	7	3	0	17

Statistics	UNM	LIB
First downs	18	19
Total yards	362	466
Rushing yards	223	160
Passing yards	139	306
Turnovers	2	1
Time of possession	30:33	29:27

Team	Category	Player	Statistics
New Mexico	Passing	Tevaka Tuioti	12/26, 139 yards, TD, 2 INT
New Mexico	Rushing	Ahmari Davis	18 rushes, 99 yards
New Mexico	Receiving	Marcus Williams	3 receptions, 33 yards
Liberty	Passing	Stephen Calvert	24/36, 306 yards, 2 TD
Liberty	Rushing	Joshua Mack	14 rushes, 95 yards
Liberty	Receiving	Antonio Gandy-Golden	6 receptions, 144 yards, TD

=== At San Jose State ===
	1	2	3	4	Total
Lobos	0	7	7	7	21
Spartans	6	20	0	6	32

Statistics	UNM	SJSU
First downs	20	19
Total yards	399	464
Rushing yards	238	52
Passing yards	161	412
Turnovers	6	1
Time of possession	27:32	32:28

Team	Category	Player	Statistics
New Mexico	Passing	Sheriron Jones	7/16, 127 yards, 2 TD, 3 INT
New Mexico	Rushing	Sheriron Jones	11 rushes, 104 yards, TD
New Mexico	Receiving	Jordan Kress	2 receptions, 46 yards, TD
San Jose State	Passing	Josh Love	24/36, 405 yards, 2 TD
San Jose State	Rushing	Nick Nash	9 rushes, 29 yards, TD
San Jose State	Receiving	Tre Walker	7 receptions, 130 yards

=== Colorado State ===
	1	2	3	4	Total
Rams	7	14	7	7	35
Lobos	6	8	0	7	21

Statistics	CSU	UNM
First downs	23	22
Total yards	551	345
Rushing yards	131	256
Passing yards	420	89
Turnovers	2	3
Time of possession	31:44	28:16

Team	Category	Player	Statistics
Colorado State	Passing	Pat O'Brien	25/34, 420 yards, 3 TD
Colorado State	Rushing	Marvin Kinsey Jr.	25 rushes, 85 yards, 2 TD
Colorado State	Receiving	Warren Jackson	9 receptions, 214 yards, 2 TD
New Mexico	Passing	Sheriron Jones	8/17, 89 yards, INT
New Mexico	Rushing	Bryson Carroll	26 rushes, 193 yards, TD
New Mexico	Receiving	Marcus Williams	5 receptions, 58 yards

=== At Wyoming ===
	1	2	3	4	Total
Lobos	0	0	0	10	10
Cowboys	7	0	6	10	23

Statistics	UNM	WYO
First downs	20	21
Total yards	372	345
Rushing yards	169	259
Passing yards	203	86
Turnovers	1	0
Time of possession	24:47	35:13

Team	Category	Player	Statistics
New Mexico	Passing	Sheriron Jones	9/17, 143 yards
New Mexico	Rushing	Ahmari Davis	14 rushes, 86 yards
New Mexico	Receiving	Jordan Kress	4 receptions, 94 yards
Wyoming	Passing	Sean Chambers	9/15, 86 yards, TD
Wyoming	Rushing	Xazavian Valladay	33 rushes, 127 yards, TD
Wyoming	Receiving	John Okwoli	3 receptions, 33 yards

=== Hawaii ===
	1	2	3	4	Total
Rainbow Warriors	21	14	3	7	45
Lobos	3	0	7	21	31

Statistics	HAW	UNM
First downs	21	23
Total yards	578	500
Rushing yards	255	207
Passing yards	323	293
Turnovers	1	2
Time of possession	32:04	27:56

Team	Category	Player	Statistics
Hawaii	Passing	Cole McDonald	17/30, 237 yards, TD, INT
Hawaii	Rushing	Cole McDonald	9 rushes, 140 yards, 2 TD
Hawaii	Receiving	Kumoku Noa	4 receptions, 120 yards, TD
New Mexico	Passing	Tevaka Tuioti	23/40, 293 yards, 2 TD, 2 INT
New Mexico	Rushing	Ahmari Davis	16 rushes, 200 yards, 2 TD
New Mexico	Receiving	Jordan Kress	4 receptions, 100 yards, TD

=== At Nevada ===
	1	2	3	4	Total
Lobos	7	0	3	0	10
Wolf Pack	0	14	0	7	21

Statistics	UNM	NEV
First downs	17	21
Total yards	346	369
Rushing yards	109	64
Passing yards	237	305
Turnovers	0	0
Time of possession	25:15	34:45

Team	Category	Player	Statistics
New Mexico	Passing	Tevaka Tuioti	19/36, 237 yards
New Mexico	Rushing	Ahmari Davis	15 rushes, 80 yards, TD
New Mexico	Receiving	Marcus Williams	6 receptions, 74 yards
Nevada	Passing	Carson Strong	28/40, 305 yards, 2 TD
Nevada	Rushing	Devonte Lee	9 rushes, 68 yards
Nevada	Receiving	Romeo Doubs	11 receptions, 167 yards, TD

=== At No. 21 Boise State ===
	1	2	3	4	Total
Lobos	0	0	3	6	9
No. 21 Broncos	28	0	14	0	42

Statistics	UNM	BSU
First downs	16	23
Total yards	292	509
Rushing yards	117	215
Passing yards	175	294
Turnovers	2	2
Time of possession	31:51	28:09

Team	Category	Player	Statistics
New Mexico	Passing	Tevaka Tuioti	14/21, 175 yards
New Mexico	Rushing	Kentrail Moran	10 rushes, 30 yards
New Mexico	Receiving	Mannie Logan-Greene	5 receptions, 60 yards
Boise State	Passing	Jaylon Henderson	15/28, 292 yards, 3 TD, INT
Boise State	Rushing	George Holani	7 rushes, 73 yards
Boise State	Receiving	John Hightower	4 receptions, 124 yards, TD

=== Air Force ===
	1	2	3	4	Total
Falcons	7	7	16	14	44
Lobos	7	3	6	6	22

Statistics	AF	UNM
First downs	20	19
Total yards	540	358
Rushing yards	213	268
Passing yards	327	90
Turnovers	1	1
Time of possession	27:35	32:25

Team	Category	Player	Statistics
Air Force	Passing	Donald Hammond III	9/10, 327 yards, 4 TD
Air Force	Rushing	Taven Birdow	17 rushes, 110 yards, TD
Air Force	Receiving	Benjamin Waters	4 receptions, 171 yards, 2 TD
New Mexico	Passing	Trae Hall	5/7, 55 yards, 2 TD
New Mexico	Rushing	Tevaka Tuioti	8 rushes, 79 yards
New Mexico	Receiving	Cedric Patterson III	2 receptions, 29 yards

=== Utah State ===
	1	2	3	4	Total
Aggies	7	24	7	0	38
Lobos	0	6	12	7	25

Statistics	USU	UNM
First downs	21	21
Total yards	368	383
Rushing yards	196	276
Passing yards	172	107
Turnovers	1	4
Time of possession	23:53	36:07

Team	Category	Player	Statistics
Utah State	Passing	Jordan Love	18/35, 172 yards, 3 TD, INT
Utah State	Rushing	Gerold Bright	19 rushes, 113 yards, TD
Utah State	Receiving	Siaosi Mariner	3 receptions, 55 yards, TD
New Mexico	Passing	Trae Hall	10/21, 107 yards, 2 TD, 2 INT
New Mexico	Rushing	Trae Hall	22 rushes, 115 yards, 2 TD
New Mexico	Receiving	Cedric Patterson III	1 reception, 30 yards

== Death of Nahje Flowers ==
On November 5, 2019, head coach Bob Davie issued a statement that defensive end Nahje Flowers had died; Flowers was 21. Two weeks later, November 19, the cause of death was revealed to be a self-inflicted gunshot wound to the head. Flowers had shared a note on social media before removing it minutes later. Flowers' autopsy report stated that he did not have chronic traumatic encephalopathy (CTE).

In August 2020, Flowers' family filed a civil suit against the NCAA, the University of New Mexico, and Davie, alleging all three were negligent in the death of Flowers. Before his death, Flowers had been dealing with mental health issues and suicidal thoughts and was seeing a school psychiatrist who had been prescribing antidepressants and instructed Flowers to sit out for at least two games. According to the lawsuit, Davie ignored the psychiatrist's advice and had Flowers continue to play. The NCAA settled for an undisclosed amount in April 2024 while UNM paid $325,000 to settle the lawsuit two months later in June.
