= 2019 Mountain West Conference Football Championship Game =

- Conference Championship
Hawaii Rainbow Warriors	Boise State Broncos
(9–4)	(11–1)
10	31
Head coach: Nick Rolovich	Head coach: Bryan Harsin
	AP / Coaches / CFP; 19 / 17 / 19
	1	2	3	4	Total
Hawaii	3	0	0	7	10
Boise State	3	14	14	0	31
- Date: December 7, 2019
- Season: 2019
- Stadium: Albertsons Stadium
- Location: Boise, ID
- MVP: Jaylon Henderson (offense) and Sonatane Lui (defense), Boise State
- Favorite: Boise State by 14.5
- Referee: Cooper Castleberry
- Attendance: 23,561

United States TV coverage
- Network: ESPN
- Announcers: Roy Philpott (play-by-play), Kelly Stouffer (analyst), and Lauren Sisler (sideline)

2019 Mountain West Conference football standings
	Conf.			Overall
Team	W		L	W		L
Mountain Division
No. 23 Boise State xy$	8	–	0	12	–	2
No. 22 Air Force	7	–	1	11	–	2
Utah State	6	–	2	7	–	6
Wyoming	4	–	4	8	–	5
Colorado State	3	–	5	4	–	8
New Mexico	0	–	8	2	–	10
West Division
Hawaii xy	5	–	3	10	–	5
San Diego State x	5	–	3	10	–	3
Nevada	4	–	4	7	–	6
San Jose State	2	–	6	5	–	7
UNLV	2	–	6	4	–	8
Fresno State	2	–	6	4	–	8
Championship: Boise State 31, Hawaii 10
$ – Conference champion; x – Division champion/co-champions; y – Championship game participant; Rankings from AP Poll

The 2019 Mountain West Conference Championship Game was a college football game played on Saturday, December 7, 2019, at Albertsons Stadium in Boise, Idaho, to determine the 2019 champion of the Mountain West Conference (MW). The game featured the Mountain division champions Boise State and the West division champions Hawaii, and was the conference's seventh championship game.

== Previous season ==
The 2018 Mountain West Conference Football Championship Game featured Mountain Division champion Boise State against West Division champion Fresno State in the conference's sixth championship game. The Bulldogs upset the Broncos in overtime.

== Teams ==
The 2019 MW Conference Championship Game was contested by the Boise State Broncos, Mountain Division champions, and the Hawaii Rainbow Warriors, West Division champions. The teams have met 16 times previously, with Boise State holding a 13–3 edge in the series. The teams' last meeting came earlier this 2019 season; Boise State won, 59–37. Hawaii's last victory in the series came in 2007, when they defeated BSU 39–27. This was the teams' first meeting in the MW Championship.

=== Boise State ===
Boise State clinched its spot in the Championship Game after its November 23 win over Utah State. This is Boise State's third consecutive and fourth overall appearance in the Championship Game. Boise State continues to represent the Mountain division for three consecutive MW Championship Games since the first game in 2013 and the first school to host the game for three years in a row. The Broncos compiled a 2–1 record in the game, winning in 2014 and in 2017.

=== Hawaii ===
Hawaii earned its spot after clinching the West Division title on November 23 with a win over San Diego State. This was Hawaii's first, and to date only, appearance in the title game.

== Game summary ==
2019 Mountain West Conference Football Championship Game

Quarter	1	2	3	4	Total
Hawaii	3	0	0	7	10
No. 19 Boise State	3	14	14	0	31

at Albertsons Stadium • Boise, Idaho

- Date: Saturday, December 7, 2019
- Game time: 4:00 p.m. EST (2:00 p.m. MST)
- Game attendance: 23,561
- Referee: Cooper Castleberry
- TV announcers (ESPN): Roy Philpott (play-by-play), Kelly Stouffer (analyst), and Lauren Sisler (sideline)
- ESPN game summary

Game information

First Quarter

- (6:44) HAW – Ryan Meskell 47 yard field goal (Drive: 11 plays, 35 yards, 6:52; Hawaii 3–0)
- (0:30) BSU – Eric Sachse 34 yard field goal (Drive: 15 plays, 58 yards, 6:14; Tied 3–3)

Second Quarter

- (1:07) BSU – Jaylon Henderson 36 yard pass to Khalil Shakir, Eric Sachse kick (Drive: 8 plays, 80 yards, 2:37; Boise State 10–3)
- (0:14) BSU – Jaylon Henderson 36 yard pass to John Hightower, Eric Sachse kick (Drive: 2 plays, 57 yards, 0:24; Boise State 17–3)

Third Quarter

- (1:09) BSU – Khalil Shakir 4 yard rush, Eric Sachse kick (Drive: 11 plays, 79 yards, 5:54; Boise State 24–3)
- (0:18) BSU – Jaylon Henderson 5 yard rush, Eric Sachse kick (Drive: 2 plays, 9 yards, 0:41; Boise State 31–3)

Fourth Quarter

- (12:00) HAW – Miles Reed 21 yard rush, Ryan Meskell kick (Drive: 8 plays, 75 yards, 3:18; Boise State 31–10)

=== Statistics ===
Statistics	HAW	BSU
First downs	16	20
Total yards	62–320	68–364
Rushes–yards	26–79	37–144
Passing yards	241	220
Passing: Comp–Att–Int	20–36–1	21–31–1
Time of possession	27:53	32:07

Team	Category	Player	Statistics
Hawaii	Passing	Cole McDonald	20/36, 241 yards, 1 INT
Hawaii	Rushing	Miles Reed	12 carries, 87 yards, 1 TD
Hawaii	Receiving	Jason-Matthew Sharsh	7 receptions, 74 yards
Boise State	Passing	Jaylon Henderson	20/29, 212 yards, 2 TD, 1 INT
Boise State	Rushing	George Holani	16 carries, 67 yards
Boise State	Receiving	Khalil Shakir	7 receptions, 89 yards, 1 TD

== See also ==
- List of Mountain West Conference football champions
