= Brad Bedell =

American football player and coach (born 1977)

Personal information
- Born: February 12, 1977 (age 49); Arcadia, California, U.S.
- Listed height: 6 ft 4 in (1.93 m)
- Listed weight: 299 lb (136 kg)

Career information
- High school: Arcadia
- College: Colorado
- NFL draft: 2000: 6th round, 206th overall pick

Career history

Playing
- Cleveland Browns (2000–2001); Washington Redskins (2003); Miami Dolphins (2003); Green Bay Packers (2004); Houston Texans (2006)

Coaching
- Colorado (2007–2009) Offensive intern; Northern Colorado (2010) Offensive line coach; UC Davis (2011) Running game coordinator & offensive line coach; New Mexico State (2012) Assistant coach; Arkansas State (2013) Offensive line coach; Texas State (2014–2015) Offensive line coach; Baylor (2016) Offensive quality control assistant; Boise State (2017–2020) Running game coordinator & offensive line coach; Auburn (2021–2022) Tight ends coach

Awards and highlights
- First-team All-American (1999)

Career NFL statistics
- Games played: 40
- Games started: 4
- Stats at Pro Football Reference

Bradley H. Bedell (born February 12, 1977) is an American former professional football guard in the National Football League (NFL) and current college football coach. He attended Mt. San Antonio College, where he played football under legendary Community College Coach Bill Fisk. He attended the University of Colorado, where he played college football. He was drafted in the sixth round of the 2000 NFL draft by the Cleveland Browns. Bedell also played for the Miami Dolphins, Washington Redskins, Green Bay Packers, and the Houston Texans. After serving as the offensive line coach at Boise State, Bedell followed head coach Bryan Harsin to Auburn as the tight ends coach. Auburn fired Bedell on October 31, 2022, along with Harsin, offensive coordinator Eric Kiesau, and several other staffers.
