= Jeff Schmedding =

American football coach (born 1978)

Denver Broncos
- Title: Inside linebackers coach

Personal information
- Born: January 18, 1978 (age 48); Spokane, Washington, U.S.

Career information
- College: Eastern Washington

Career history
- Eastern Washington (2004–2018); Graduate assistant (2004–2006); Safeties coach (2007); Linebackers coach (2008–2009); Special teams coordinator/safeties coach (2010–2014); Defensive coordinator/safeties coach (2015–2018); Boise State (2019–2020) Defensive coordinator/linebackers coach; Auburn (2021–2022); Linebackers coach (2021); Defensive coordinator (2022); Washington State (2023–2024) Defensive coordinator; Denver Broncos (2025–present) Inside linebackers coach

Jeff Schmedding (born January 19, 1978) is an American professional football coach who is the inside linebackers coach for the Denver Broncos of the National Football League (NFL). He has previously served as the defensive coordinator for Eastern Washington, Auburn, Boise State, and Washington State.

== Coaching career ==
=== Eastern Washington ===
Schmedding began his coaching career as a graduate assistant at his alma mater Eastern Washington. Schmedding would serve numerous roles for the team including coaching special teams, safeties and linebackers before becoming the defensive coordinator for Eastern Washington in 2015.

=== Boise State ===
In 2019, he was hired by Bryan Harsin to serve as the defensive coordinator for Boise State.

=== Auburn ===
In 2021, when Harsin left Boise State for Auburn, he hired Schmedding to coach linebackers. In 2022, Schmedding was named Auburn's defensive coordinator following the departure of Derek Mason. Schmedding also served as Auburn's assistant head coach. Following Bryan Harsin's firing from Auburn midway through the 2022 season, Schmedding was the lone assistant brought by Harsin to Auburn that was retained by interim head coach Cadillac Williams. Upon the hiring of Hugh Freeze it was announced that Schmedding would not be retained by Auburn.

=== Washington State ===
In January 2023, Schmedding was named defensive coordinator at Washington State. On December 2, 2024, Schmedding was fired from Washington State, with the Cougars' defense allowing 429 yards per game (116th in the FBS) and an average of 5.2 yards per rush (120th in the FBS).

=== Denver Broncos ===
On March 21, 2025, Schmedding was hired as the Denver Broncos' inside linebackers coach.

== Personal life ==
Schmedding is married and has two sons.
