= 2019 Fresno State Bulldogs football team =

American college football season

2019 Fresno State Bulldogs football
- Conference: Mountain West Conference
- West Division
- Record: 4–8 (2–6 MW)
- Head coach: Jeff Tedford (3rd season)
- Offensive coordinator: Ryan Grubb (1st season)
- Offensive scheme: Pro-style
- Defensive coordinator: Bert Watts (2nd season)
- Base defense: 4–3
- Home stadium: Bulldog Stadium

2019 Mountain West Conference football standings
	Conf.			Overall
Team	W		L	W		L
Mountain Division
No. 23 Boise State xy$	8	–	0	12	–	2
No. 22 Air Force	7	–	1	11	–	2
Utah State	6	–	2	7	–	6
Wyoming	4	–	4	8	–	5
Colorado State	3	–	5	4	–	8
New Mexico	0	–	8	2	–	10
West Division
Hawaii xy	5	–	3	10	–	5
San Diego State x	5	–	3	10	–	3
Nevada	4	–	4	7	–	6
San Jose State	2	–	6	5	–	7
UNLV	2	–	6	4	–	8
Fresno State	2	–	6	4	–	8
Championship: Boise State 31, Hawaii 10
$ – Conference champion; x – Division champion/co-champions; y – Championship game participant; Rankings from AP Poll

The 2019 Fresno State Bulldogs football team represented California State University, Fresno in the 2019 NCAA Division I FBS football season. The Bulldogs were led by third year head coach Jeff Tedford and played their games at Bulldog Stadium as a member of the Mountain West Conference in the West Division. They finished the season 4–8, 2–6 in Mountain West play to finish in a three-way tie for fourth place in the West Division.

On December 6, head coach Jeff Tedford resigned citing health reasons. He finished at Fresno State with a three-year record of 26–14.

== Preseason ==
=== Mountain West media days ===
The Mountain West media days will be held on July 23–24 at the Cosmopolitan on the Las Vegas Strip.

==== Media poll ====
The preseason poll was released at the Mountain West media days on July 23, 2019. The Bulldogs were predicted to finish in first place in the MW West Division.

== Schedule ==
Date	Time	Opponent	Site	TV	Result	Attendance
August 31	7:30 p.m.	at USC*	LA Memorial Coliseum; Los Angeles, CA	ESPN	L 23–31	57,329
September 7	7:30 p.m.	Minnesota*	Bulldog Stadium; Fresno, CA	CBSSN	L 35–38 ^{2OT}	34,790
September 21	7:00 p.m.	Sacramento State*	Bulldog Stadium; Fresno, CA	Stadium on Facebook	W 34–20	31,034
September 28	5:00 p.m.	at New Mexico State*	Aggie Stadium; Las Cruces, NM	FloSports/FSNAZ+	W 30–17	8,872
October 12	4:00 p.m.	at Air Force	Falcon Stadium; Colorado Springs, CO	CBSSN	L 24–43	22,544
October 18	7:00 p.m.	UNLV	Bulldog Stadium; Fresno, CA	CBSSN	W 56–27	26,256
October 26	4:30 p.m.	Colorado State^{†}	Bulldog Stadium; Fresno, CA	ESPNU	L 31–41	32,890
November 2	9:00 p.m.	at Hawaii	Aloha Stadium; Honolulu, HI (rivalry)	KAIL/SPEC HI	W 41–38	22,058
November 9	4:00 p.m.	Utah State	Bulldog Stadium; Fresno, CA	CBSSN	L 35–37	32,037
November 15	6:30 p.m.	at San Diego State	SDCCU Stadium; San Diego, CA	ESPN2	L 7–17	26,876
November 23	7:30 p.m.	Nevada	Bulldog Stadium; Fresno, CA	ESPN2	L 28–35	32,303
November 30	7:30 p.m.	at San Jose State	CEFCU Stadium; San Jose, CA (rivalry)	ESPN2	L 16–17	12,835
*Non-conference game; ^{†}Homecoming; Rankings from AP Poll released prior to the game; All times are in Pacific time

== Game summaries ==
=== At USC ===
	1	2	3	4	Total
Bulldogs	3	7	3	10	23
Trojans	14	3	14	0	31

=== Minnesota ===
	1	2	3	4	OT	2OT	Total
Golden Gophers	7	7	0	14	7	3	38
Bulldogs	0	10	11	7	7	0	35

=== Sacramento State ===
	1	2	3	4	Total
Hornets	6	6	0	8	20
Bulldogs	7	7	0	20	34

=== At New Mexico State ===
	1	2	3	4	Total
Bulldogs	7	17	6	0	30
Aggies	0	3	7	7	17

=== At Air Force ===
	1	2	3	4	Total
Bulldogs	14	10	0	0	24
Falcons	7	15	7	14	43

=== UNLV ===
	1	2	3	4	Total
Rebels	3	14	3	7	27
Bulldogs	7	21	7	21	56

=== Colorado State ===
	1	2	3	4	Total
Rams	14	3	7	17	41
Bulldogs	7	7	14	3	31

=== At Hawaii ===
	1	2	3	4	Total
Bulldogs	7	7	17	10	41
Rainbow Warriors	0	24	0	14	38

=== Utah State ===
	1	2	3	4	Total
Aggies	7	14	10	6	37
Bulldogs	7	7	14	7	35

=== At San Diego State ===
	1	2	3	4	Total
Bulldogs	7	0	0	0	7
Aztecs	7	3	0	7	17

=== Nevada ===
	1	2	3	4	Total
Wolf Pack	14	0	14	7	35
Bulldogs	7	14	7	0	28

=== At San Jose State ===
	1	2	3	4	Total
Bulldogs	14	2	0	0	16
Spartans	3	0	7	7	17

== Players drafted into the NFL ==
Round	Pick	Player	Position	NFL club
4	119	Mykal Walker	ILB	Atlanta Falcons
6	181	Netane Muti	OG	Denver Broncos
