= 2019 San Diego State Aztecs football team =

American college football season

2019 San Diego State Aztecs football

MW West Division co-champion New Mexico Bowl champion

New Mexico Bowl, W 48–11 vs. Central Michigan
- Conference: Mountain West Conference
- West Division
- Record: 10–3 (5–3 MW)
- Head coach: Rocky Long (9th season)
- Offensive coordinator: Jeff Horton (5th season)
- Offensive scheme: Pro-style
- Defensive coordinator: Zach Arnett (2nd season)
- Base defense: 3–3–5
- Home stadium: SDCCU Stadium

2019 Mountain West Conference football standings
	Conf.			Overall
Team	W		L	W		L
Mountain Division
No. 23 Boise State xy$	8	–	0	12	–	2
No. 22 Air Force	7	–	1	11	–	2
Utah State	6	–	2	7	–	6
Wyoming	4	–	4	8	–	5
Colorado State	3	–	5	4	–	8
New Mexico	0	–	8	2	–	10
West Division
Hawaii xy	5	–	3	10	–	5
San Diego State x	5	–	3	10	–	3
Nevada	4	–	4	7	–	6
San Jose State	2	–	6	5	–	7
UNLV	2	–	6	4	–	8
Fresno State	2	–	6	4	–	8
Championship: Boise State 31, Hawaii 10
$ – Conference champion; x – Division champion/co-champions; y – Championship game participant; Rankings from AP Poll

The 2019 San Diego State Aztecs football team represented San Diego State University in the 2019 NCAA Division I FBS football season. The Aztecs were led by ninth year head coach Rocky Long and played their final home games at SDCCU Stadium. San Diego State competed as a member of the Mountain West Conference in the West Division.

On January 8, 2020, head coach Rocky Long resigned.

== Preseason ==
=== Mountain West media days ===
Mountain West Media Days were held on July 23–24 at the Cosmopolitan at the Las Vegas Strip.

==== Media poll ====
The preseason poll was released at the Mountain West media days on July 23, 2019. The Aztecs were predicted to finish in second place in the MW West Division.

== Schedule ==
Date	Time	Opponent	Rank	Site	TV	Result	Attendance
August 31	6:00 p.m.	No. 8 (FCS) Weber State*		SDCCU Stadium; San Diego, CA	Stadium on Facebook	W 6–0	40,222
September 7	1:15 p.m.	at UCLA*		Rose Bowl; Pasadena, CA	P12N	W 23–14	36,951
September 14	5:00 p.m.	at New Mexico State*		Aggie Memorial Stadium; Las Cruces, NM	FloSports, FSNAZ+	W 31–10	10,123
September 21	7:30 p.m.	Utah State		SDCCU Stadium; San Diego, CA	CBSSN	L 17–23	27,367
October 5	7:00 p.m.	at Colorado State		Canvas Stadium; Fort Collins, CO	ESPN2	W 24–10	29,767
October 12	7:30 p.m.	Wyoming		SDCCU Stadium; San Diego, CA	CBSSN	W 26–22	28,758
October 19	4:00 p.m.	at San Jose State		CEFCU Stadium; San Jose, CA	Stadium on Facebook	W 27–17	18,285
October 26	7:30 p.m.	at UNLV		Sam Boyd Stadium; Whitney, NV	CBSSN	W 20–17	19,652
November 9	7:30 p.m.	Nevada^{†}	No. 24	SDCCU Stadium; San Diego, CA	ESPN2	L 13–17	27,973
November 15	6:30 p.m.	Fresno State		SDCCU Stadium; San Diego, CA	ESPN2	W 17–7	26,876
November 23	8:00 p.m.	at Hawaii		Aloha Stadium; Halawa, HI	SPEC HI	L 11–14	24,911
November 30	6:00 p.m.	BYU*		SDCCU Stadium; San Diego, CA	CBSSN	W 13–3	28,180
December 21	11:00 a.m.	vs. Central Michigan*		Dreamstyle Stadium; Albuquerque, NM (New Mexico Bowl)	ESPN	W 48–11	18,823
*Non-conference game; ^{†}Homecoming; Rankings from AP Poll released prior to the game; All times are in Pacific time

== Game summaries ==
=== Weber State ===
	1	2	3	4	Total
No. 8 (FCS) Wildcats	0	0	0	0	0
Aztecs	0	3	0	3	6

=== At UCLA ===
	1	2	3	4	Total
Aztecs	10	0	10	3	23
Bruins	7	0	7	0	14

=== At New Mexico State ===
	1	2	3	4	Total
Aztecs	7	10	7	7	31
Aggies	0	0	10	0	10

=== Utah State ===
	1	2	3	4	Total
Aggies	7	13	3	0	23
Aztecs	3	0	0	14	17

=== At Colorado State ===
	1	2	3	4	Total
Aztecs	3	7	7	7	24
Rams	3	0	0	7	10

=== Wyoming ===
	1	2	3	4	Total
Cowboys	0	14	0	8	22
Aztecs	3	3	13	7	26

=== At San Jose State ===
	1	2	3	4	Total
Aztecs	7	6	14	0	27
Spartans	7	0	3	7	17

=== At UNLV ===
	1	2	3	4	Total
Aztecs	14	3	3	0	20
Rebels	0	7	3	7	17

=== Nevada ===
	1	2	3	4	Total
Wolf Pack	3	0	7	7	17
No. 24 Aztecs	0	3	7	3	13

=== Fresno State ===
	1	2	3	4	Total
Bulldogs	7	0	0	0	7
Aztecs	7	3	0	7	17

=== At Hawaii ===
	1	2	3	4	Total
Aztecs	0	3	0	8	11
Rainbow Warriors	7	0	7	0	14

=== BYU ===
	1	2	3	4	Total
Cougars	3	0	0	0	3
Aztecs	0	7	3	3	13

=== Vs. Central Michigan (New Mexico Bowl) ===
	1	2	3	4	Total
Chippewas	3	0	8	0	11
Aztecs	7	13	21	7	48

== Rankings ==
Ranking movements Legend: ██ Increase in ranking ██ Decrease in ranking — = Not ranked RV = Received votes
	Week																
Poll	Pre	1	2	3	4	5	6	7	8	9	10	11	12	13	14	15	Final
AP	—	—	—	—	—	—	—	RV	RV	25	24	RV	RV	—	—	—	RV
Coaches	—	—	—	—	—	—	RV	RV	RV	RV	24	RV	25	RV	RV	RV	RV
CFP	Not released										—	—	—	—	—	—	Not released

== Players drafted into the NFL ==
Round	Pick	Player	Position	NFL Club
5	156	Keith Ismael	C	Washington Redskins
