= 2019 UNLV Rebels football team =

American college football season

2019 UNLV Rebels football
- Conference: Mountain West Conference
- West Division
- Record: 4–8 (2–6 MW)
- Head coach: Tony Sanchez (5th season)
- Offensive coordinator: Garin Justice (1st season)
- Offensive scheme: Multiple
- Defensive coordinator: Tim Skipper (2nd season)
- Base defense: 3–4
- Home stadium: Sam Boyd Stadium

2019 Mountain West Conference football standings
	Conf.			Overall
Team	W		L	W		L
Mountain Division
No. 23 Boise State xy$	8	–	0	12	–	2
No. 22 Air Force	7	–	1	11	–	2
Utah State	6	–	2	7	–	6
Wyoming	4	–	4	8	–	5
Colorado State	3	–	5	4	–	8
New Mexico	0	–	8	2	–	10
West Division
Hawaii xy	5	–	3	10	–	5
San Diego State x	5	–	3	10	–	3
Nevada	4	–	4	7	–	6
San Jose State	2	–	6	5	–	7
UNLV	2	–	6	4	–	8
Fresno State	2	–	6	4	–	8
Championship: Boise State 31, Hawaii 10
$ – Conference champion; x – Division champion/co-champions; y – Championship game participant; Rankings from AP Poll

The 2019 UNLV Rebels football team represented the University of Nevada, Las Vegas (UNLV) as a member of the Mountain West Conference (MW) during the 2019 NCAA Division I FBS football season. Led by Tony Sanchez in his fifth and final season as head coach, the Rebels compiled an overall record of 4–8 record with mark of 2–6 in conference play, placing in three-way tie for fourth at the bottom of the standings in the MW's West Division. The team played home games at Sam Boyd Stadium in Whitney, Nevada.

On November 25, UNLV and Sanchez agreed that he would leave as head coach after the team's final game of the season. This was the final season in which UNLV played at Sam Boyd Stadium. The Rebels moved into the newly-constructed Allegiant Stadium in 2020.

== Schedule ==
Date	Time	Opponent	Site	TV	Result	Attendance
August 31	7:00 p.m.	Southern Utah*	Sam Boyd Stadium; Whitney, NV	Stadium	W 56–23	17,421
September 7	7:00 p.m.	Arkansas State*	Sam Boyd Stadium; Whitney, NV	Stadium on Facebook	L 17–43	18,742
September 14	12:30 p.m.	at Northwestern*	Ryan Field; Evanston, IL	BTN	L 14–30	37,714
September 28	5:00 p.m.	at Wyoming	War Memorial Stadium; Laramie, WY	ESPNU	L 17–53	23,029
October 5	7:30 p.m.	No. 16 Boise State	Sam Boyd Stadium; Whitney, NV	CBSSN	L 13–38	24,681
October 12	1:00 p.m.	at Vanderbilt*	Vanderbilt Stadium; Nashville, TN	SECN	W 34–10	20,048
October 18	7:00 p.m.	at Fresno State	Bulldog Stadium; Fresno, CA	CBSSN	L 27–56	26,256
October 26	7:30 p.m.	San Diego State	Sam Boyd Stadium; Whitney, NV	CBSSN	L 17–20	19,652
November 2	12:30 p.m.	at Colorado State	Canvas Stadium; Fort Collins, CO	ATTSNRM	L 17–37	24,103
November 16	1:00 p.m.	Hawaii^{†}	Sam Boyd Stadium; Whitney, NV	Stadium on Facebook, SPEC HI	L 7–21	21,317
November 23	1:00 p.m.	San Jose State	Sam Boyd Stadium; Whitney, NV	ATTSNRM	W 38–35	17,373
November 30	12:00 p.m.	at Nevada	Mackay Stadium; Reno, NV (Fremont Cannon)	ATTSNRM	W 33–30 ^{OT}	16,683
*Non-conference game; ^{†}Homecoming; Rankings from AP Poll released prior to the game; All times are in Pacific time

== Preseason ==
=== Media poll ===
The preseason poll was released at the Mountain West media days on July 23, 2019. The Rebels were predicted to finish in fifth place in the MW West Division.

== Game summaries ==
=== Southern Utah ===
Southern Utah at UNLV

Team	1	2	3	4	Total
Thunderbirds	0	7	0	16	23
• Rebels	7	28	21	0	56

- Date: August 31, 2019
- Location: Sam Boyd Stadium
  Whitney, NV
- Game start: 7:06 p.m. PDT
- Elapsed time: 3 hours and 26 minutes
- Game attendance: 17,421
- Game weather: Temperature: 105 °F (41 °C) • Weather: Clear • Wind: 9 MPH
- Referee: Dwayne Johnson
- TV announcers (Stadium): Tony Cordasco and Joe Haro

Scoring summary
1	04:58	UNLV	Charles Williams 22–yard run (Daniel Gutierrez kick)	UNLV 7–0
1	14:13	UNLV	Charles Williams 8–yard run (Daniel Gutierrez kick)	UNLV 14–0
2	09:34	SUU	Chris Helbig 2–yard run (Kekoa Sasaoka kick)	UNLV 14–7
2	05:51	UNLV	Armani Rogers 1–yard run (Daniel Gutierrez kick)	UNLV 21–7
2	02:36	UNLV	Mekhi Stevenson 18–yard pass from Armani Rogers (Daniel Gutierrez kick)	UNLV 28–7
2	00:40	UNLV	Charles Williams 5–yard run (Daniel Gutierrez kick)	UNLV 35–7
2	13:46	UNLV	Armani Rogers 66–yard run (Daniel Gutierrez kick)	UNLV 42–7
3	09:00	UNLV	Courtney Reese 11–yard run (Daniel Gutierrez kick)	UNLV 49–7
3	05:21	UNLV	Darran Williams 4–yard run (Daniel Gutierrez kick)	UNLV 56–7
4	06:08	SUU	Zach Nelson 7–yard pass from Tyler Skidmore (Kekoa Sasaoka kick)	UNLV 56–14
4	00:19	SUU	Zach Nelson 5–yard pass from Tyler Skidmore (Kekoa Sasaoka kick)	UNLV 56–21
4	00:17	SUU	Team 1–yard safety	UNLV 56–23

=== Arkansas State ===
Arkansas State at UNLV

Team	1	2	3	4	Total
• Red Wolves	10	13	10	10	43
Rebels	0	3	7	7	17

- Date: September 7, 2019
- Location: Sam Boyd Stadium
  Whitney, NV
- Game start: 7:06 p.m. PDT
- Elapsed time: 3 hours and 5 minutes
- Game attendance: 18,742
- Game weather: Temperature: 101 °F (38 °C) • Weather: Mostly Clear • Wind: SW 18 MPH
- Referee: Wayne Walker
- TV announcers (Stadium on Facebook): Noah Coslov, Ikechuku Ndukwe and Kristen Balboni (sideline)

Scoring summary
1	13:45	ASU	Jeremy Smith 35–yard interception (Blake Grupe kick)	ASU 7–0
1	04:40	ASU	Blake Grupe 26–yard field goal	ASU 10–0
2	13:42	UNLV	Daniel Gutierrez 27–yard field goal	ASU 10–3
2	08:45	ASU	Logan Bonner 1–yard run (Blake Grupe kick)	ASU 17–3
2	02:49	ASU	Ryan Graham 9–yard run (Blake Grupe kick blocked)	ASU 23–3
3	12:30	ASU	Kirk Merritt 37–yard pass from Logan Bonner (Blake Grupe kick)	ASU 30–3
3	07:53	UNLV	Charles Williams 3–yard run (Daniel Gutierrez kick)	ASU 30–10
3	05:53	ASU	Blake Grupe 38–yard field goal	ASU 33–10
4	12:58	ASU	Omar Bayless 71–yard pass from Logan Bonner (Blake Grupe kick)	ASU 40–10
4	03:33	ASU	Blake Grupe 31–yard field goal	ASU 43–10
4	01:53	UNLV	Randal Grimes 56–yard pass from Kenyon Oblad (Daniel Gutierrez kick)	ASU 43–17

=== At Northwestern ===
UNLV at Northwestern

Team	1	2	3	4	Total
Rebels	7	7	0	0	14
• Wildcats	10	6	7	7	30

- Date: September 14, 2019
- Location: Ryan Field
  Evanston, IL
- Game start: 12:46 p.m. PDT
- Elapsed time: 3 hours and 2 minutes
- Game attendance: 37,714
- Game weather: Temperature: 77 °F (25 °C) • Weather: Sunny • Wind: SE 9 MPH
- Referee: Larry Smith
- TV announcers (BTN): Lisa Byington, James Laurinaitis and Elise Menaker (sideline)

Scoring summary
1	12:32	NU	Hunter Johnson 1–yard run (Charlie Kuhbander kick)	NU 7–0
1	11:14	UNLV	Charles Williams 65–yard run (Daniel Gutierrez kick)	TIE 7–7
1	06:21	NU	Charlie Kuhbander 33–yard field goal	NU 10–7
2	10:56	UNLV	Charles Williams 37–yard run (Daniel Gutierrez kick)	UNLV 14–10
2	06:01	NU	Charlie Kuhbander 30–yard field goal	UNLV 14–13
2	01:19	NU	Charlie Kuhbander 44–yard field goal	NU 16–14
3	05:58	NU	J. J. Jefferson 50–yard pass from Hunter Johnson (Charlie Kuhbander kick)	NU 23–14
4	01:30	NU	Drake Anderson 7–yard run (Charlie Kuhbander kick)	NU 30–14

=== At Wyoming ===
UNLV at Wyoming

Team	1	2	3	4	Total
Rebels	10	0	0	7	17
• Cowboys	7	26	0	20	53

- Date: September 28, 2019
- Location: War Memorial Stadium
  Laramie, WY
- Game start: 6:02 p.m. MDT
- Elapsed time: 3 hours and 22 minutes
- Game attendance: 23,029
- Game weather: Temperature: 59 °F (15 °C) • Weather: Partly Cloudy • Wind: SE 28 MPH
- Referee: Mike Cuttone
- TV announcers (ESPNU): Mike Corey and Rene Ingoglia

Scoring summary
1	09:03	UNLV	Daniel Gutierrez 40–yard field goal	UNLV 3–0
1	04:50	WYO	Xazavian Valladay 7–yard run (Cooper Rothe kick)	WYO 7–0
1	01:09	UNLV	Giovanni Fauolo Sr. 54–yard pass from Armani Rogers (Daniel Gutierrez kick)	UNLV 10–7
2	14:18	WYO	Sean Chambers 17–yard run (Cooper Rothe kick failed)	WYO 13–10
2	10:36	WYO	Josh Harshman 56–yard pass from Sean Chambers (Cooper Rothe kick)	WYO 20–10
2	03:53	WYO	Cooper Rothe 41–yard field goal	WYO 23–10
2	02:08	WYO	Cooper Rothe 21–yard field goal	WYO 26–10
2	01:04	WYO	Jackson Marcotte 20–yard pass from Sean Chambers (Cooper Rothe kick)	WYO 33–10
4	14:49	WYO	Sean Chambers 5–yard run (Cooper Rothe kick)	WYO 40–10
4	10:24	UNLV	Kenyon Oblad 1–yard run (Daniel Gutierrez kick)	WYO 40–17
4	09:44	WYO	Titus Swen 44–yard run (Cooper Rothe kick failed)	WYO 46–17
4	09:26	WYO	Xazavian Valladay 4–yard run (Cooper Rothe kick)	WYO 53–17

=== Boise State ===
Boise State at UNLV

Team	1	2	3	4	Total
• No. 16 Broncos	7	10	7	14	38
Rebels	0	0	7	6	13

- Date: October 5, 2019
- Location: Sam Boyd Stadium
  Whitney, NV
- Game start: 7:35 p.m. PDT
- Elapsed time: 3 hours and 29 minutes
- Game attendance: 24,681
- Game weather: Temperature: 79 °F (26 °C) • Weather: Clear Skies • Wind: NE 2 MPH
- Referee: Stephen Baron
- TV announcers (CBSSN): Carter Blackburn, Aaron Taylor and Jenny Dell (sideline)

Scoring summary
1	11:33	BSU	Garrett Collingham 2–yard pass from Hank Bachmeier (Eric Sachse kick)	BSU 7–0
2	13:38	BSU	John Hightower 76–yard pass from Hank Bachmeier (Eric Sachse kick)	BSU 14–0
2	00:00	BSU	Joel Velazquez 52–yard field goal	BSU 17–0
3	06:40	BSU	Akilian Butler 23–yard run (Eric Sachse kick)	BSU 24–0
3	02:33	UNLV	Mekhi Stevenson 11–yard pass from Kenyon Oblad (Daniel Gutierrez kick)	BSU 24–7
4	05:31	BSU	Khalil Shakir 24–yard pass from Chase Cord (Eric Sachse kick)	BSU 31–7
4	01:23	UNLV	Darren Woods Jr. 12–yard pass from Kenyon Oblad (Daniel Gutierrez kick failed)	BSU 31–13
4	01:07	BSU	Andrew Van Buren 6–yard run (Eric Sachse kick)	BSU 38–13

=== At Vanderbilt ===
UNLV at Vanderbilt

Team	1	2	3	4	Total
• Rebels	7	17	0	10	34
Commodores	7	3	0	0	10

- Date: October 12, 2019
- Location: Vanderbilt Stadium
  Nashville, TN
- Game start: 3:01 p.m. CDT
- Elapsed time: 3 hours and 7 minutes
- Game attendance: 20,048
- Game weather: Temperature: 59 °F (15 °C) • Weather: Sunny • Wind: NW 6 MPH
- Referee: David Alvarez
- TV announcers (SECN): Dave Neal, D. J. Shockley and Dawn Davenport (sideline)

Scoring summary
1	12:10	VANDY	Ke'Shawn Vaughn 4–yard run (Ryley Guay kick)	VANDY 7–0
1	05:45	UNLV	Charles Williams 5–yard run (Daniel Gutierrez kick)	TIE 7–7
2	14:52	UNLV	Daniel Gutierrez 44–yard field goal	UNLV 10–7
2	12:05	UNLV	Randal Grimes 63–yard pass from Kenyon Oblad (Daniel Gutierrez kick)	UNLV 17–7
2	09:28	VANDY	Ryley Guay 48–yard field goal	UNLV 17–10
2	03:39	UNLV	Noah Bean 5–yard pass from Kenyon Oblad (Daniel Gutierrez kick)	UNLV 24–10
4	14:56	UNLV	Daniel Gutierrez 29–yard field goal	UNLV 27–10
4	10:44	UNLV	Chad Magyar 14–yard run (Daniel Gutierrez kick)	UNLV 34–10

=== At Fresno State ===
UNLV at Fresno State

Team	1	2	3	4	Total
Rebels	3	14	3	7	27
• Bulldogs	7	21	7	21	56

- Date: October 18, 2019
- Location: Bulldog Stadium
  Fresno, CA
- Game start: 7:09 p.m. PDT
- Elapsed time: 3 hours and 25 minutes
- Game attendance: 26,256
- Game weather: Temperature: 68 °F (20 °C) • Weather: Clear • Wind: NW 4 MPH
- Referee: Cooper Castleberry
- TV announcers (CBSSN): Carter Blackburn, Aaron Taylor and Jenny Dell (sideline)

Scoring summary
1	11:17	UNLV	Daniel Gutierrez 22–yard field goal	UNLV 3–0
1	0:519	FS	Ronnie Rivers 7–yard run (Cesar Silva kick)	FS 7–0
2	13:51	UNLV	Randal Grimes 12–yard pass from Kenyon Oblad (Daniel Gutierrez kick)	UNLV 10–7
2	13:19	FS	Josh Hokit 1–yard run (Cesar Silva kick)	FS 14–10
2	04:33	FS	Ronnie Rivers 11–yard run (Cesar Silva kick)	FS 21–10
2	01:44	UNLV	Noah Bean 60–yard pass from Kenyon Oblad (Daniel Gutierrez kick)	FS 21–17
2	00:41	FS	Jorge Reyna 3–yard run (Cesar Silva kick)	FS 28–17
3	09:03	UNLV	Daniel Gutierrez 22–yard field goal	FS 28–20
3	03:49	FS	Justin Rice 18–yard fumble recovery (Cesar Silva kick)	FS 35–20
4	12:19	FS	Jared Rice 12–yard pass from Jorge Reyna (Cesar Silva kick)	FS 42–20
4	11:50	FS	Josh Hokit 1–yard run (Cesar Silva kick)	FS 49–20
4	09:58	FS	Josh Hokit 6–yard run (Cesar Silva kick)	FS 56–20
4	05:16	UNLV	Randal Grimes 12–yard pass from Kenyon Oblad (Daniel Gutierrez kick)	FS 56–27

=== San Diego State ===
San Diego State at UNLV

Team	1	2	3	4	Total
• Aztecs	14	3	3	0	20
Rebels	0	7	3	7	17

- Date: October 26, 2019
- Location: Sam Boyd Stadium
  Whitney, NV
- Game start: 7:32 p.m. PDT
- Elapsed time: 3 hours and 15 minutes
- Game attendance: 19,652
- Game weather: Temperature: 74 °F (23 °C) • Weather: Clear Skies • Wind: SE 5 MPH
- Referee: Brad Van Vark
- TV announcers (CBSSN): Carter Blackburn, Aaron Taylor and Jenny Dell (sideline)

Scoring summary
1	07:23	SDSU	Ethan Dedeaux 49–yard pass from Ryan Agnew (Matt Araiza kick)	SDSU 7–0
1	00:52	SDSU	Caden McDonald 0–yard blocked punt return (Matt Araiza kick)	SDSU 14–0
2	03:01	SDSU	Matt Araiza 25–yard field goal	SDSU 17–0
2	01:26	UNLV	Randal Grimes 58–yard pass from Kenyon Oblad (Daniel Gutierrez kick)	SDSU 17–7
3	08:34	UNLV	Daniel Gutierrez 22–yard field goal	SDSU 17–10
3	00:00	SDSU	Matt Araiza 34–yard field goal	SDSU 20–10
4	05:57	UNLV	Giovanni Fauolo Sr. 2–yard pass from Kenyon Oblad (Daniel Gutierrez kick)	SDSU 20–17

=== At Colorado State ===
UNLV at Colorado State

Team	1	2	3	4	Total
Rebels	0	0	3	14	17
• Rams	21	3	3	10	37

- Date: November 2, 2019
- Location: Canvas Stadium
  Fort Collins, CO
- Game start: 1:38 p.m. MDT
- Elapsed time: 3 hours and 12 minutes
- Game attendance: 24,103
- Game weather: Temperature: 44 °F (7 °C) • Weather: Clear and Sunny • Wind: E 5 MPH
- Referee: Michael VanderVelde
- TV announcers (ATTSNRM): Drew Goodman, Sherdrick Bonner, Brad Thompson (sideline) and Taylor McGregor (sideline)

Scoring summary
1	14:46	CSU	Anthony Hawkins 99–yard kickoff return (Maxwell Poduska kick)	CSU 7–0
1	10:48	CSU	Marcus McElroy 18–yard run (Maxwell Poduska kick)	CSU 14–0
1	00:11	CSU	Jaylen Thomas 11–yard run (Maxwell Poduska kick)	CSU 21–0
2	07:58	CSU	Cayden Camper 50–yard field goal	CSU 24–0
3	09:39	UNLV	Daniel Gutierrez 37–yard field goal	CSU 24–3
3	03:13	CSU	Maxwell Poduska 23–yard field goal	CSU 27–3
4	10:08	CSU	Maxwell Poduska 24–yard field goal	CSU 30–3
4	07:08	UNLV	Randal Grimes 14–yard pass from Kenyon Oblad (Daniel Gutirrez kick)	CSU 30–10
4	03:24	CSU	Christian Hunter 5–yard run (Maxwell Poduska kick)	CSU 37–10
4	01:39	UNLV	Darren Woods Jr. 15–yard pass from Kenyon Oblad (Daniel Gutierrez kick)	CSU 37–17

=== Hawaii ===
Hawaii at UNLV

Team	1	2	3	4	Total
• Rainbow Warriors	0	7	7	7	21
Rebels	7	0	0	0	7

- Date: November 16, 2019
- Location: Sam Boyd Stadium
  Whitney, NV
- Game start: 1:07 p.m. PST
- Elapsed time: 2 hours and 58 minutes
- Game attendance: 21,317
- Game weather: Temperature: 79 °F (26 °C) • Weather: Clear Skies • Wind: N 2 MPH
- Referee: Cal McNeill
- TV announcers (Stadium on Facebook/SPEC HI): Robert Kekaula and Rich Miano

Scoring summary
1	02:06	UNLV	Darren Woods Jr. 31–yard pass from Kenyon Oblad (Daniel Gutierrez kick)	UNLV 7–0
2	00:22	UH	Cole McDonald 1–yard run (Ryan Meskell kick)	TIE 7–7
3	01:33	UH	Cortez Davis 43–yard interception (Ryan Meskell kick)	UH 14–7
4	11:31	UH	Cole McDonald 2–yard run (Ryan Meskell kick)	UH 21–7

=== San Jose State ===
San Jose State at UNLV

Team	1	2	3	4	Total
Spartans	6	0	22	7	35
• Rebels	7	14	3	14	38

- Date: November 23, 2019
- Location: Sam Boyd Stadium
  Whitney, NV
- Game start: 1:08 p.m. PST
- Elapsed time: 3 hours and 27 minutes
- Game attendance: 17,373
- Game weather: Temperature: 62 °F (17 °C) • Weather: Fair Weather Clouds • Wind: N 9 MPH
- Referee: Mike Cuttone
- TV announcers (ATTSNRM): Drew Goodman, Sherdrick Bonner and Brad Thompson (sideline)

Scoring summary
1	10:02	UNLV	Charles Williams 12–yard run (Daniel Gutierrez kick)	UNLV 7–0
1	03:51	SJSU	DeJon Packer 1–yard run (Matt Mercurio kick failed)	UNLV 7–6
2	14:19	UNLV	Shelton Zeon III 7–yard pass from Kenyon Oblad (Daniel Gutierrez kick)	UNLV 14–6
2	09:37	UNLV	Randal Grimes 35–yard pass from Kenyon Oblad (Daniel Gutierrez kick)	UNLV 21–6
3	10:07	SJSU	DeJon Packer 65–yard pass from Josh Love (Isaiah Holiness pass)	UNLV 21–14
3	07:05	UNLV	Daniel Gutierrez 45–yard field goal	UNLV 24–14
3	01:04	SJSU	Jack Snyder 4–yard run (Matt Mercurio kick)	UNLV 24–21
3	00:00	SJSU	Brett Foley 26–yard pass from Josh Love (Matt Mercurio kick)	SJSU 28–24
4	10:09	UNLV	Charles Williams 4–yard run (Daniel Gutierrez kick)	UNLV 31–28
4	06:17	SJSU	Tre Walker 25–yard pass from Josh Love (Matt Mercurio kick)	SJSU 35–31
4	01:15	UNLV	Charles Williams 1–yard run (Daniel Gutierrez kick)	UNLV 38–35

=== At Nevada ===
UNLV at Nevada

Team	1	2	3	4	OT	Total
• Rebels	17	7	0	3	6	33
Wolf Pack	0	13	0	14	3	30

- Date: November 30, 2019
- Location: Mackay Stadium
  Reno, NV
- Game start: 12:08 p.m. PST
- Elapsed time: 3 hours and 19 minutes
- Game attendance: 16,683
- Game weather: Temperature: 29 °F (−2 °C) • Weather: Cool Overcast • Wind: ESE 4 MPH
- Referee: Kevin Hassell
- TV announcers (ATTSNRM): Drew Goodman, Sherdrick Bonner and Brad Thompson (sideline)

Scoring summary
1	10:19	UNLV	Daniel Gutierrez 40–yard field goal	UNLV 3–0
1	04:43	UNLV	Charles Williams 80–yard run (Daniel Gutierrez kick)	UNLV 10–0
1	01:38	UNLV	Mekhi Stevenson 32–yard pass from Kenyon Oblad (Daniel Gutierrez kick)	UNLV 17–0
2	13:09	NEV	Devonte Lee 2–yard run (Spencer Pettit kick)	UNLV 17–7
2	08:02	NEV	Brandon Talton 27–yard field goal	UNLV 17–10
2	03:10	NEV	Brandon Talton 31–yard field goal	UNLV 17–13
2	02:58	UNLV	Steve Jenkins 75–yard pass from Kenyon Oblad (Daniel Gutierrez kick)	UNLV 24–13
4	09:08	NEV	Daniel Gutierrez 50–yard field goal	UNLV 27–13
4	06:47	NEV	Dominic Christian 24–yard pass from Carson Strong (Brandon Talton kick)	UNLV 27–20
4	01:32	NEV	Devonte Lee 1–yard run (Brandon Talton kick)	TIE 27–27
OT	15:00	NEV	Brandon Talton 42–yard field goal	NEV 30–27
OT	15:00	UNLV	Steve Jenkins 19–yard pass from Kenyon Oblad	UNLV 33–30
