= Zak Hill =

American football player and coach (born 1979)

Current position
- Title: Quarterbacks coach & passing game coordinator
- Team: Boise State
- Conference: PAC12

Biographical details
- Born: September 14, 1979 (age 46); Portland, Oregon, U.S.

Playing career
- 1999–2003: Central Washington
- Position: Quarterback

Coaching career (HC unless noted)
- 2004–2005: Eastern Washington (SA)
- 2006–2007: Hillsboro HS (OR) (OC)
- 2008: Hillsboro HS (OR)
- 2009–2015: Eastern Washington (PGC/QB)
- 2016: Boise State (co-OC/QB)
- 2017–2019: Boise State (OC/QB)
- 2020–2021: Arizona State (OC/QB)
- 2022: American Leadership Academy Gilbert North (AC)
- 2023: Saguaro HS (AZ)
- 2024: Seattle Seahawks (OA)
- 2025–present: Boise State (QB/PGC)

Head coaching record
- Overall: 15–10 (high school)

Accomplishments and honors

Awards
- NCAA Division II Third Team All-American (2002)

Zak Hill (born September 14, 1979) is an American football coach. He was also previously the offensive coordinator for the Boise State Broncos and Arizona State Sun Devils.

== Early life and playing career ==
A native of Battle Ground, Washington, Hill played quarterback at Central Washington University from 1999 to 2003, where he threw for over 8,000 yards and 76 touchdowns in his career. He was a third-team All-American in 2002, where he led Central Washington to an 11–1 record. He graduated from Central Washington in 2004 with a degree in school health education.

== Coaching career ==
=== Early coaching career ===
Hill began his coaching career at Eastern Washington in 2004, where he worked as a student assistant for two years. He left Eastern Washington to be the offensive coordinator at Hillsboro High School in Oregon. He was promoted to head coach in 2008, leading the Spartans to a 6–5 record and a playoff berth in the state's Class 5A playoffs. He left Hillsboro to rejoin Eastern Washington as the team's passing game coordinator and quarterbacks coach. He served in that role for 6 years before leaving for Hawaii.

=== Hawaii ===
Hill was hired to be the next offensive coordinator and quarterbacks coach for the University of Hawaii in 2016. However, Hill resigned after 48 days to accept a position with Boise State as their new co-offensive coordinator and quarterbacks coach. He left at a crucial point in recruiting, leaving Hawaii just seven days before high school athletes could sign their letters of intent.

=== Boise State ===
Hill was hired by Boise State in 2016, sharing offensive coordinator duties with Scott Huff and coaching quarterbacks. After Huff left to be the run game coordinator and offensive line coach at Washington, Hill was promoted to the sole offensive coordinator.

=== Arizona State ===
Hill was named the offensive coordinator and quarterbacks coach for Arizona State in December 2019, replacing Rob Likens. Hill resigned January 28, 2022 as OC amid the NCAA investigation into the football program’s recruiting practices during the Covid dead period.

=== Saguaro HS (AZ) ===
Hill was hired to replace Jason Mohns, who took a coaching role at Arizona State. Saguaro finished 9-5 on the regular season and finished with a 6A state championship.
