= Bryan Harsin =

American football player and coach (born 1976)

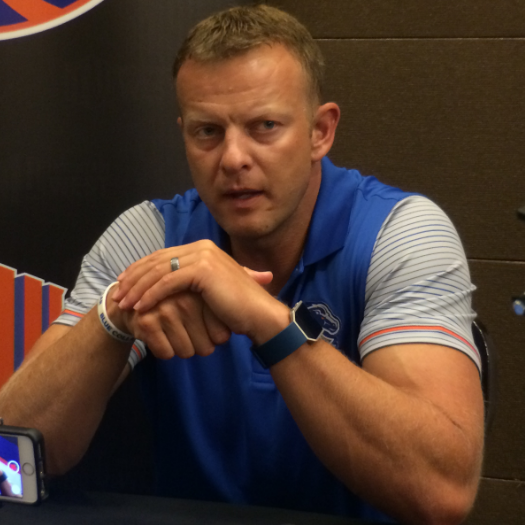
- Harsin in 2016

Biographical details
- Born: November 1, 1976 (age 49); Boise, Idaho, U.S.

Playing career
- 1995–1999: Boise State
- Position: Quarterback

Coaching career (HC unless noted)
- 2000: Eastern Oregon (RB/WR)
- 2001: Boise State (GA)
- 2002–2005: Boise State (TE)
- 2006–2010: Boise State (OC/QB)
- 2011–2012: Texas (co-OC/QB)
- 2013: Arkansas State
- 2014–2020: Boise State
- 2021–2022: Auburn
- 2025: California (OC/QB)

Head coaching record
- Overall: 85–36
- Bowls: 3–3

Accomplishments and honors

Championships
- 1 Sun Belt (2013); 3 Mountain West (2014, 2017, 2019); 5 Mountain Division (2014, 2016, 2017, 2018, 2019)

Awards
- Broyles Award finalist (2009)

Bryan Dale Harsin (born November 1, 1976) is an American college football coach who was most recently the offensive coordinator at California. He was the head coach for the Auburn Tigers from 2021 to 2022. Prior to Auburn, he was the head coach at his alma mater, Boise State from the 2014 season through the 2020 season where he posted a 69–19 overall record. He began his head coaching career at Arkansas State University for the 2013 season. Harsin was the co-offensive coordinator at the University of Texas for two seasons. Before leaving for Texas in 2011, Harsin was an assistant at Boise State for 10 seasons, the last five as offensive coordinator and quarterbacks coach.

From Boise, Idaho, Harsin is a graduate of Boise's Capital High School, and a former quarterback at Boise State. He was the first alumnus of Boise State to serve as the Broncos head football coach.

== Playing career ==
Born and raised in Boise, Harsin graduated from Capital High School and was a quarterback at Boise State University from 1995 to 1999, where he was a three-year letterman and earned a bachelor's degree in business management in 2000.

== Coaching career ==
=== Eastern Oregon ===
Harsin got his start at Eastern Oregon University in La Grande, coaching running backs and quarterbacks in the 2000 season.

=== Boise State ===
In 2001, he returned to Boise State as a graduate assistant under first year coach Dan Hawkins. Harsin was hired as tight ends coach in 2002 and remained in that position through 2005. During this period the Broncos led the nation in scoring twice and remained in the top 10 scoring offenses all four years. In 2005, four Broncos tight ends combined to catch 27 passes for 298 yards and three touchdowns.

When Hawkins left BSU for Colorado, offensive coordinator Chris Petersen was promoted to head coach for the 2006 season. Harsin was moved up to offensive coordinator and quarterbacks coach, and guided the Broncos offense to an undefeated season. Running back Ian Johnson rushed for 1,713 yards and led the nation in rushing touchdowns and scoring. In 2008, Kellen Moore took over the quarterback position and under Harsin's guidance earned WAC Freshman of the Year honors, completing an NCAA freshman record 69.4 completion percentage (281–405) with 25 touchdown passes and only 10 interceptions.

During Harsin's tenure as offensive coordinator, Boise State posted a 61–5 (.924) record, which included two undefeated seasons and two Fiesta Bowl victories, over Oklahoma (2007) and TCU (2010).

=== Texas ===
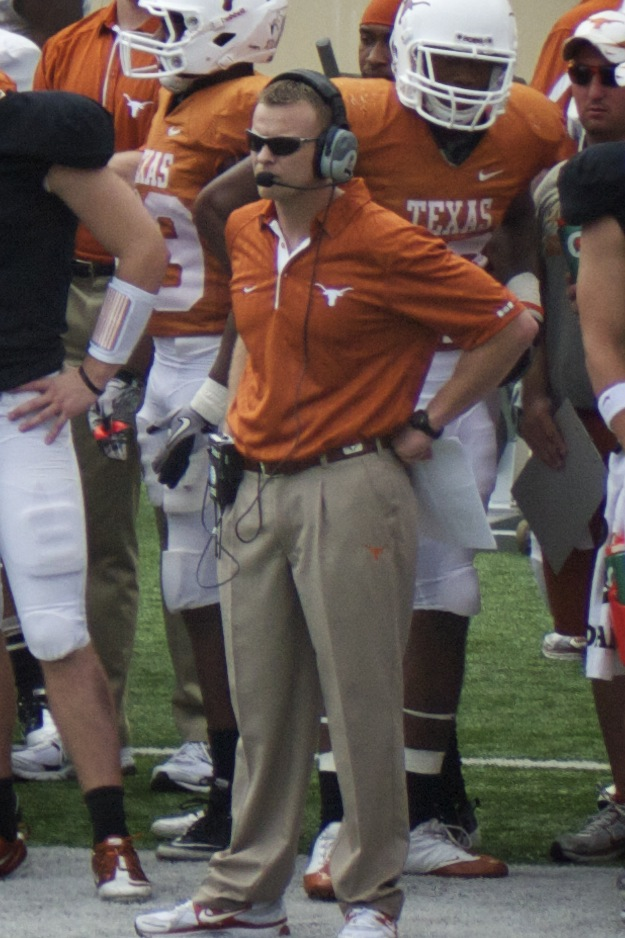
Harsin in April 2011

After the 2010 season, Harsin moved to the University of Texas in Austin for the 2011 and 2012 seasons and was the primary play-caller for the Longhorns, paired with Major Applewhite as co-offensive coordinators. During this time he also served as quarterbacks coach for the Longhorns.

=== Arkansas State ===
Harsin became the 29th head coach at Arkansas State University in Jonesboro on December 12, 2012, succeeding Gus Malzahn, who left for Auburn after just one season. Because Malzahn and his predecessor Hugh Freeze left after just one season in Jonesboro, Harsin's contract at Arkansas State included a $1.75 million buyout clause.

Harsin led the Red Wolves to a 7–5 regular season record in 2013 and a share of the Sun Belt Conference title with a 5–2 record. The Red Wolves earned a berth in the 2014 GoDaddy Bowl against Ball State on January 5, a 23–20 victory.

=== Boise State (second stint) ===
Harsin returned to Boise State as head coach on December 11, 2013. He replaced his mentor Petersen, who left for the University of Washington in Seattle. In his first season at the helm, he led his team to a win at the Mountain West Championship against Fresno State 28–14, and earned a spot in the Fiesta Bowl against Arizona. The Broncos won the Fiesta Bowl 38–30, and Harsin won 12 games in his first season. Harsin led the Broncos to 10+ wins in 5 out of his 7 seasons.

=== Auburn ===
Harsin was hired on December 22, 2020, as the 27th head coach of the Auburn Tigers, taking over after the termination of Gus Malzahn. His salary was $5.25 million. In his inaugural season with the Tigers, Harsin went 6–7, the team's worst record since 2012. Despite the losing record, the season saw ranked victories over Arkansas and Ole Miss to go along with a narrow 24–22 4OT loss to #3 Alabama. Following the season, Harsin fired offensive coordinator Mike Bobo and hired former Seattle Seahawks quarterback coach, Austin Davis, to replace Bobo before losing Davis just six weeks later for personal reasons. Harsin also lost defensive coordinator Derek Mason to Oklahoma State where Mason took the same role for less money. In addition to the coordinator changes, 31 players left the program, including starting quarterback Bo Nix who described his time under Harsin as "miserable".

Following the loss of players and coaches, as well as rumors that began circulating in February 2022, Auburn began to collect information to understand any issues surrounding the football program. Harsin told ESPN that "I'm not planning on going anywhere". Multiple players, current and former, came out in opposition to Harsin with one former player stating that Harsin "treated us like dogs". Amid the investigation, Auburn instituted a new policy that employees of the university could be fired "for not cooperating with an investigation or review", without stating whether or not Harsin or other members of the football coaching staff were or were not participating in the investigation.

In the end, Auburn decided to retain Harsin as head coach. Harsin would later, in July 2022, describe the situation this way: "There was an inquiry. It was uncomfortable. It was unfounded. It presented an opportunity for people to personally attack me, my family and also our program. And it didn't work." Harsin's recruiting also came under significant criticism during his tenure at Auburn, signing the worst two recruiting classes in program history by a wide margin, with the coaches of many of the top high school programs in Alabama stating that they had never met Harsin and that he was "absent on the recruiting trail".

Harsin was fired as Auburn's head coach on October 31, 2022 following a 3–5 start to the season. He finished with a 9–12 record and recorded the lowest winning percentage for a non-interim head coach at Auburn since Earl Brown (1948–1950).

=== Cal ===
On December 9, 2024, Harsin was named as the offensive coordinator for the California Golden Bears.

== Controversies ==
In 2020, amid the George Floyd Protests, Jason Robinson, who previously played for Harsin at Boise State, called out Harsin for failing to speak out about police violence against black men in the United States. In response, Harsin released a statement that said "We all need to be better" without directly addressing the death of Floyd or racial injustice.

In 2022, prior to the initiation of an investigation of Auburn's program under Harsin, one player stated that "we got treated like we wasn't good enough and like dogs" by Harsin, and that Harsin "has a terrible mindset as a person", while another accused him of failing to connect with Black players. After the investigation, there was speculation that "the real reason for the inquiry into the program" was the "possible mistreatment of Black football players."

Following President Trump's criminal conviction in 2024, Harsin was criticized for his describing the guilty verdict as "evil."

== Head coaching record ==
Year	Team	Overall	Conference	Standing	Bowl/playoffs	Coaches^{#}	AP^{°}
Arkansas State Red Wolves (Sun Belt Conference) (2013)
2013	Arkansas State	7–5	5–2	T–1st	GoDaddy*		
Arkansas State:		7–5	5–2	* Departed Arkansas State for Boise State before bowl game			
Boise State Broncos (Mountain West Conference) (2014–2020)
2014	Boise State	12–2	7–1	1st (Mountain)	W Fiesta^{†}	16	16
2015	Boise State	9–4	5–3	T–2nd (Mountain)	W Poinsettia		
2016	Boise State	10–3	6–2	T–1st (Mountain)	L Cactus		
2017	Boise State	11–3	7–1	1st (Mountain)	W Las Vegas	22	22
2018	Boise State	10–3	7–1	T–1st (Mountain)	First Responder (Note: The First Responder Bowl was cancelled due to inclement weather and ruled a no contest.)	23	24
2019	Boise State	12–2	8–0	1st (Mountain)	L Las Vegas	22	23
2020	Boise State	5–2	5–0	2nd			
Boise State:		69–19	45–8				
Auburn Tigers (Southeastern Conference) (2021–2022)
2021	Auburn	6–7	3–5	T–6th (Western)	L Birmingham		
2022	Auburn	3–5 (Note: Auburn fired Harsin with four games remaining.)	1–4	(Western)			
Auburn:		9–12	4–9				
Total:		85–36					
National championship Conference title Conference division title or championship game berth
^{†}Indicates CFP / New Years' Six bowl.; ^{#}Rankings from final Coaches Poll.; ^{°}Rankings from final AP Poll.
