= John Hightower (American football) =

American football player (born 1996)

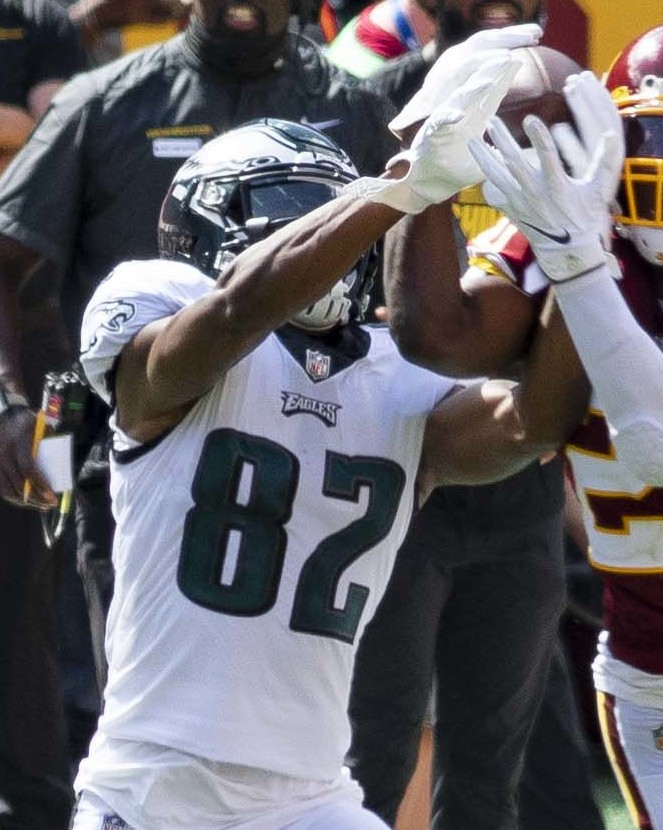
- Hightower with the Philadelphia Eagles in 2020

Profile
- Position: Wide receiver

Personal information
- Born: May 31, 1996 (age 30); Landover, Maryland, U.S.
- Listed height: 6 ft 2 in (1.88 m)
- Listed weight: 190 lb (86 kg)

Career information
- High school: Riverdale Baptist (Upper Marlboro, Maryland)
- College: Hinds CC (2016–2017); Boise State (2018–2019)
- NFL draft: 2020: 5th round, 168th overall pick

Career history
- Philadelphia Eagles (2020–2021); Los Angeles Chargers (2022–2023)*; DC Defenders (2024)*; Michigan Panthers (2024)
- * Offseason or practice squad member only

Career NFL statistics
- Receptions: 10
- Receiving yards: 167
- Stats at Pro Football Reference

John Hightower IV (born May 31, 1996) is an American professional football wide receiver. He played college football at Boise State and was selected by the Philadelphia Eagles in the fifth round of the 2020 NFL draft.

== Early life ==
Hightower attended Riverdale Baptist School in Upper Marlboro, Maryland.

== College career ==
Hightower originally attended Hinds Community College for two years before attending Boise State University. In the two years at Hinds, he had 31 receptions for 509 yards and seven touchdowns. During his first year at Boise State in 2018, Hightower started four of 10 games, recording 31 receptions for 504 yards and six touchdowns. In his senior season in 2019, he started 13 of 14 games and had 51 receptions for 943 yards and eight touchdowns.

== Professional career ==
Pre-draft measurables
Height	Weight	Arm length	Hand span	Wingspan	40-yard dash	10-yard split	20-yard split	20-yard shuttle	Three-cone drill	Vertical jump	Broad jump
6 ft 1 1/2 in (1.87 m)	189 lb (86 kg)	31 1/2 in (0.80 m)	9 3/4 in (0.25 m)	6 ft 3 1/8 in (1.91 m)	4.43 s	1.49 s	2.67 s	4.21 s	7.07 s	38.5 in (0.98 m)	10 ft 2 in (3.10 m)
All values from NFL Combine

=== Philadelphia Eagles ===
Hightower was selected by the Philadelphia Eagles in the fifth round with the 168th overall pick of the 2020 NFL draft.

On August 31, 2021, Hightower was waived by the Eagles and re-signed to the practice squad the next day. He was placed on the COVID-19 list on December 28 and activated seven days later. He signed a reserve/future contract with the Eagles on February 3, 2022.

On August 30, 2022, Hightower was waived by the Eagles.

=== Los Angeles Chargers ===
On September 28, 2022, Hightower was signed to the Los Angeles Chargers practice squad. He signed a reserve/future contract on January 17, 2023. He was released on August 29, 2023, as a part of the team’s final roster cuts.

=== DC Defenders ===
On February 15, 2024, Hightower signed with the DC Defenders of the United Football League (UFL). He was released on March 10, 2024.

=== Michigan Panthers ===
On March 14, 2024, Hightower was signed by the Michigan Panthers of the UFL. He was released on May 13. He re-signed on January 16, 2025. He was released on March 14.
