= George Holani =

American football player (born 1999)

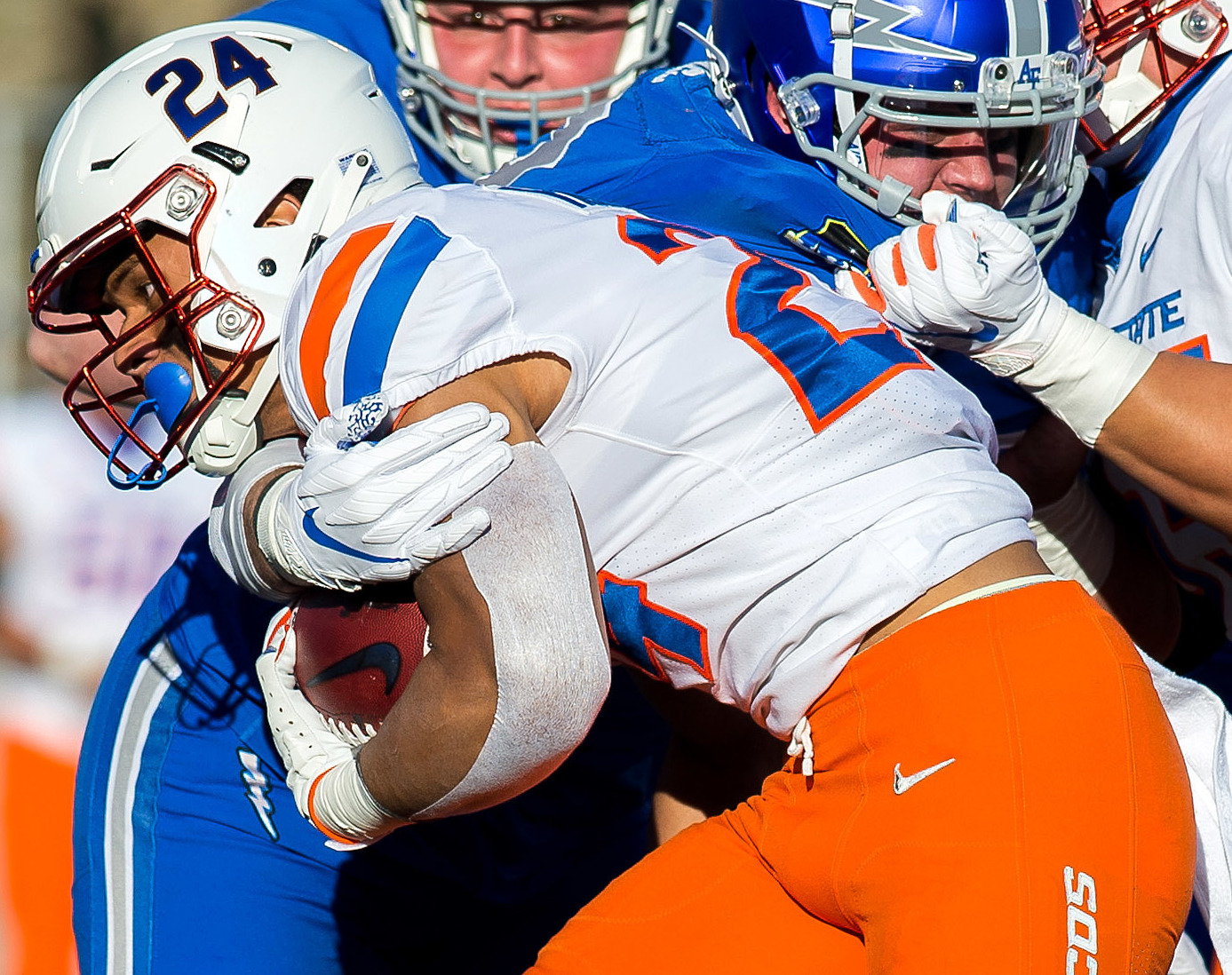
- Holani with the Boise State Broncos in 2020

No. 36 – Seattle Seahawks
- Positions: Running back, kickoff returner
- Roster status: Active

Personal information
- Born: December 16, 1999 (age 26); Auckland, New Zealand
- Listed height: 5 ft 10 in (1.78 m)
- Listed weight: 210 lb (95 kg)

Career information
- High school: St. John Bosco (Bellflower, California, U.S.)
- College: Boise State (2019–2023)
- NFL draft: 2024: undrafted

Career history
- Seattle Seahawks (2024–present)

Awards and highlights
- Super Bowl champion (LX); MW Freshman of the Year (2019); 2× Second-team All-MW (2019, 2022)

Career NFL statistics as of 2025
- Rushing yards: 83
- Rushing average: 3.3
- Rushing touchdowns: 1
- Receptions: 3
- Receiving yards: 14
- Return yards: 387
- Stats at Pro Football Reference

George Holani (born December 16, 1999) is a New Zealand-born American professional football running back and kickoff returner for the Seattle Seahawks of the National Football League (NFL). He is of Tongan descent. He played college football for the Boise State Broncos.

== Early life ==
Holani was born in Auckland, New Zealand to Tongan parents. His family moved to Los Angeles when he was a child. Holani attended St. John Bosco High School where he played both rugby (his father's game) and football, and was rated as a three-star recruit when he committed to play college football for the Boise State Broncos.

== College career ==
In week 10 of the 2019 season, Holani got his first career start against San Jose State where he rushed for 126 yards and four touchdowns. He was named the Mountain West Conference Freshman of the Year and a second-team all-Mountain West selection. In his first three seasons from 2019 to 2021, Holani rushed for 1,691 yards and nine touchdown and made 47 receptions for 427 yards and five touchdowns.

In 2022, Holani rushed for 1,157 yards and ten touchdowns and brought in 24 receptions for 151 yards and three touchdowns, earning second-team all-Mountain West honors. In 2023, he rushed for 748 yards and seven touchdowns and brought in 17 receptions for 199 yards. After the season, Holani declared for the 2024 NFL draft. He participated in the 2024 NFL combine after receiving an invite.

Holani finished his Boise State career with 3,569 rushing yards and 26 touchdowns, while also hauling in 88 receptions for 777 yards and eight touchdowns.

== Professional career ==
Pre-draft measurables
Height	Weight	Arm length	Hand span	Wingspan	40-yard dash	10-yard split	20-yard split	20-yard shuttle	Three-cone drill	Vertical jump	Broad jump	Bench press
5 ft 10 3/8 in (1.79 m)	208 lb (94 kg)	29 3/4 in (0.76 m)	9 3/4 in (0.25 m)	6 ft 0 3/8 in (1.84 m)	4.52 s	1.57 s	2.64 s	4.33 s	7.32 s	39.0 in (0.99 m)	10 ft 7 in (3.23 m)	24 reps
All values from NFL Combine

Holani signed with the Seattle Seahawks as an undrafted free agent on May 3, 2024. He was waived on August 27, and re-signed to the practice squad. On December 26, Holani was signed to the active roster after Kenneth Walker III was placed on injured reserve. As a rookie, he appeared in five games, mainly contributing on special teams.

On September 14, 2025, in Seattle's game against the Pittsburgh Steelers, Holani scored his first NFL touchdown, recovering Seattle's own kickoff in the end zone. In Week 10, he scored his first NFL rushing touchdown against the Arizona Cardinals. On November 29, Holani was placed on injured reserve due to a hamstring injury. He appeared in 11 games in the 2025 season, recording 22 carries for 73 yards and a touchdown. Holani was activated ahead of the team's NFC Championship matchup against the Los Angeles Rams. Following an injury to Zach Charbonnet, he had an expanded role in the game, as well as Super Bowl LX. Holani contributed in Super Bowl LX with 13 scrimmage yards in the 29–13 win over the New England Patriots.

Designated as an exclusive rights free agent in the 2026 offseason, the Seahawks tendered Holani on March 2, 2026. Holani signed the tender on March 16.

== NFL career statistics ==
=== Regular season ===
Legend
	Led the league
**Bold**	Career high

Year	Team	Games		Rushing					Receiving					Fumbles	
Year	Team	GP	GS	Att	Yds	Avg	Lng	TD	Rec	Yds	Avg	Lng	TD	Fum	Lost
2024	SEA	**5**	0	**3**	**10**	**3.3**	**8**	**0**	**1**	**-1**	-1.0	-1	0	**0**	**0**
2025	SEA	11	**0**	23	73	3.3	9	1	2	15	**7.5**	**11**	**0**	1	**1**
Career		16	0	25	83	3.3	9	1	3	14	4.7	11	0	1	1

=== Postseason ===
Year	Team	Games		Rushing					Receiving					Fumbles	
Year	Team	GP	GS	Att	Yds	Avg	Lng	TD	Rec	Yds	Avg	Lng	TD	Fum	Lost
2025	SEA	2	0	5	10	2.0	5	0	4	34	8.5	13	0	0	0
Career		2	0	5	10	2.0	5	0	4	34	8.5	13	0	0	0

== Personal life ==
Holani's parents are both Tongan, and have eleven children together including Holani. Growing up, he often had to babysit his siblings while his parents worked, ingraining him with a sense of responsibility from a young age.
