= Matlin (surname) =

Matlin is a surname. Notable people with this surname include:

== People ==
- David Matlin (born 1964), director of athletics for the University of Hawaii at Manoa
- Joel Matlin, Canadian entrepreneur; president and founder of North American home alarm company AlarmForce
- Marlee Matlin (born 1965), American actress, author, and activist

== Fictional characters ==
- Katie Matlin, a character from Degrassi: The Next Generation
- Maya Matlin, a character from Degrassi: Next Class

== See also ==
- Matlin (disambiguation)
