= List of Hawaii Rainbow Warriors bowl games =

The Hawaii Rainbow Warriors college football team competes as part of the NCAA Division I Football Bowl Subdivision (FBS), representing the University of Hawaiʻi at Mānoa in the Mountain West Conference (MW). Since the establishment of the team in 1909, Hawaii has appeared in 15 bowl games. Hawaii also has an appearance in a Bowl Championship Series (BCS) game as a "BCS Buster" for the 2008 Sugar Bowl against Georgia. The latest bowl occurred on December 24, 2025, when Hawai'i beat California 35–31 in the 2025 Hawaii Bowl. The win brought the Rainbow Warriors' overall bowl record to nine wins and six losses (9–6).

== Key ==
General
†	Bowl game record attendance
‡	Former bowl game record attendance

Results
W	Win
L	Loss

== Bowl games ==
List of bowl games showing bowl played in, score, date, season, opponent, stadium, location, attendance and head coach (Note: Statistics correct as of 2012–13 NCAA football bowl games.)
#	Bowl	Score (Note: Results are sortable first by whether the result was a Hawaii win, loss or tie and then second by the margin of victory.)	Date	Season (Note: Links to the season article for the Hawaii team that competed in the bowl for that year.)	Opponent (Note: Links to the season article for the opponent that Hawaii competed against in the bowl for that year when available or to their general page when unavailable.)	Stadium	Location	Attendance	Head coach
1	Aloha Bowl	L 13–33	December 25, 1989	1989	Michigan State	Aloha Stadium	Honolulu	50,000^{†}	Bob Wagner
2	Holiday Bowl	W 27–17	December 30, 1992	1992	Illinois	Jack Murphy Stadium (Note: Now known as SDCCU Stadium.)	San Diego	44,457	Bob Wagner
3	Oahu Bowl	W 23–17	December 25, 1999	1999	Oregon State	Aloha Stadium	Honolulu	46,451^{†}	June Jones
4	Hawaii Bowl	L 28–36	December 25, 2002	2002	Tulane	Aloha Stadium	Honolulu	31,535^{‡}	June Jones
5	Hawaii Bowl	W 54–48	December 25, 2003	2003	Houston	Aloha Stadium	Honolulu	29,005	June Jones
6	Hawaii Bowl	W 59–40	December 24, 2004	2004	UAB	Aloha Stadium	Honolulu	39,662^{‡}	June Jones
7	Hawaii Bowl	W 41–24	December 24, 2006	2006	Arizona State	Aloha Stadium	Honolulu	43,435^{‡}	June Jones
8	Sugar Bowl	L 10–41	January 1, 2008	2007	Georgia	Louisiana Superdome (Note: Now known as Caesars Superdome.)	New Orleans	74,383	June Jones
9	Hawaii Bowl	L 21–49	December 24, 2008	2008	Notre Dame	Aloha Stadium	Honolulu	45,718^{†}	Greg McMackin
10	Hawaii Bowl	L 35–62	December 24, 2010	2010	Tulsa	Aloha Stadium	Honolulu	43,673	Greg McMackin
11	Hawaii Bowl	W 52–35	December 24, 2016	2016	Middle Tennessee	Aloha Stadium	Honolulu	23,175	Nick Rolovich
12	Hawaii Bowl	L 14–31	December 22, 2018	2018	Louisiana Tech	Aloha Stadium	Honolulu	30,911	Nick Rolovich
13	Hawaii Bowl	W 38–34	December 24, 2019	2019	BYU	Aloha Stadium	Honolulu	21,582	Nick Rolovich
14	New Mexico Bowl	W 28–14	December 24, 2020	2020	Houston	Toyota Stadium	Frisco, Texas	2,060	Todd Graham
_	Hawaii Bowl	Canceled	December 24, 2021	2021	Memphis	Clarence T.C. Ching Athletics Complex	Honolulu	N/A	Todd Graham
15	Hawaii Bowl	W 35–31	December 24, 2025	2025	California	Clarence T.C. Ching Athletics Complex	Honolulu	15,194	Timmy Chang
