= Corey Batoon =

American football player and coach (born 1968)

Current position
- Title: Defensive coordinator
- Team: Missouri
- Conference: SEC
- Annual salary: $1 million

Biographical details
- Born: October 1, 1968 (age 58); Honolulu, Hawaii, U.S.
- Education: California State University, Long Beach (1991); Saint Mary's College of California (1996)

Playing career
- 1986–1987: San Diego J.C.
- 1988–1989: Long Beach State
- Position: Safety

Coaching career (HC unless noted)
- 1991–1992: Pierce (CA) (DB/ST)
- 1993–1995: Saint Mary's (CA) (DB/RC)
- 1996: Central Missouri State (secondary/STC)
- 1997: Montana (DL)
- 1998–2008: Northern Arizona (assistant/DA)
- 2009–2011: Arkansas State (DB/ST)
- 2012: Ole Miss (assistant AD for player development)
- 2013–2014: Ole Miss (assistant AD for recruiting operations/defensive assistant)
- 2015–2016: Ole Miss (STC/S)
- 2017: Florida Atlantic (S/ST/co-DC)
- 2018–2019: Hawaii (DC/S)
- 2020: Liberty (S)
- 2021–2023: South Alabama (DC/S)
- 2024–present: Missouri (DC)

Corey Batoon (born October 1, 1968) is an American football coach and former player who is currently the defensive coordinator for the Missouri Tigers. He previously served as the defensive coordinator and safeties coach at South Alabama from 2021 to 2023.

== Playing career ==
Batoon played safety at San Diego City Junior College from 1986 to 1987.

He transferred to Long Beach State, and played from 1988 to 1989.

=== St. Bernard High School ===
Batoon started his coaching career as defensive coordinator at St. Bernard High School in Playa Del Rey, CA from 1990 to 1991.

=== Pierce College ===
Batoon started his college coaching career as the defensive backs and special teams coach at Los Angeles Pierce College from 1991 to 1992.

=== Saint Mary's (CA) ===
From 1993 to 1995, Batoon served as the defensive backs coach and recruiting coordinator for the Saint Mary's Gaels.

=== Central Missouri State ===
In 1996, Batoon served as the secondary & special teams coordinator at Central Missouri State.

=== Montana ===
In 1997, Batoon served as the defensive line coach at Montana.

=== Northern Arizona ===
From 1998 to 2008, Batoon spent the next 11 years at Northern Arizona University, where he was an assistant head coach, defensive coordinator, secondary coach and special teams coordinator, where the Lumberjacks appeared in 3 FCS Playoffs. He developed the Lumberjacks into one of the top defensive units in the Big Sky Conference during his tenure there and built the reputation of NAU's elite defensive play.

=== Arkansas State ===
In 2009, Batoon was named the defensive backs and special teams coach at Arkansas State. During that year, the Red Wolves defensive was ranked number 1 in total defense and number 2 in passing defense in the Sun Belt Conference.

=== Ole Miss ===
On February 14, 2012, Batoon joined Hugh Freeze's new coaching staff as an assistant AD for player development. On January 12, 2015, Batoon was promoted to the special teams coordinator and safeties coach. During his tenure at Ole Miss, Batoon helped to develop safeties Trae Elston and Mike Hilton, as Elston was named first team All-SEC, and Hilton was named second team All-SEC. During Batoon's tenure as the special teams coordinator, the Rebels special teams had a top 32 punt return and kick return defense and sophomore kicker Gary Wunderlich set a school record, going 63-of-63 on PATs.

=== Florida Atlantic ===
On December 30, 2016, Batoon joined Lane Kiffin's staff at Florida Atlantic as the safeties coach, special teams coach and the co-defensive coordinator. Florida Atlantic had one of the biggest turnaround seasons in college football that year, going from a 3–9 team in 2016 to a 11–3 record in 2017, winning the Conference USA Championship and the Boca Raton Bowl. The Owls defense that year ranked 21st nationally in yards allowed per game, 22nd in points allowed per game, 17th in passing yards allowed per game, and 21st in total interceptions.

=== Hawaii ===
On December 29, 2017, Batoon was named the defensive coordinator and safeties coach at Hawaii. In his first season with Hawaii in 2018, the team finished 8–6 after earning a bid to the Hawaii Bowl. During his second season, the Rainbow Warriors had improved with a 10–5 record, winning the Mountain West Conference West Division title and earning a berth in the league championship game and defeating BYU in the Hawaii Bowl. During those two seasons, seven individuals garnered all-Mountain West recognition.

=== Liberty ===
On January 31, 2020, Batoon was named as the safeties coach at Liberty. During his tenure at Liberty, the team finished 10–1 overall and defeated Coastal Carolina in the Cure Bowl.

=== South Alabama ===
On December 21, 2020, Batoon was named as the defensive coordinator and safeties coach at South Alabama, joining Kane Wommack's new coaching staff. During his first season with the Jaguars, he was named as a nominee of the Broyles Award, after the team allowed the fewest rushing and total offense yards since the program moved up to the NCAA Football Bowl Subdivision level in 2012.

=== Missouri ===
On January 26, 2024, Batoon was hired as the defensive coordinator at Missouri.

== Personal life ==
Batoon and his wife, Stacy, have two daughters, Brandy and Summer.
