= 2019 Hawaii Bowl =

Postseason college football bowl game

2019 SoFi Hawaii Bowl
- 18th Hawaii Bowl
Hawaii Rainbow Warriors	BYU Cougars
(9–5)	(7–5)
Mountain West	Independent
38	34
Head coach: Nick Rolovich	Head coach: Kalani Sitake
	1	2	3	4	Total
Hawaii	14	17	0	7	38
BYU	7	17	7	3	34
- Date: December 24, 2019
- Season: 2019
- Stadium: Aloha Stadium
- Location: Honolulu, Hawaii
- MVP: Cole McDonald (QB, Hawaii) & Zach Wilson (QB, BYU)
- Favorite: BYU by 2.5
- Referee: Tim O'Dey (MAC)
- Attendance: 21,582 (Note: Official attendance: 21,582; turnstile attendance: 19,539)
- Payout: US$1,200,000

United States TV coverage
- Network: ESPN & ESPN Radio
- Announcers: ESPN: Jason Benetti (play-by-play), Rod Gilmore (analyst) and Quint Kessenich (sideline); ESPN Radio: Kevin Winter (play-by-play), Brad Edwards & Trevor Matich (analysts)

The 2019 Hawaii Bowl was a college football bowl game played on December 24, 2019, with kickoff at 8:00 p.m. EST (3:00 p.m. local HST) on ESPN. It was the 18th edition of the Hawaii Bowl, and was one of the 2019–20 bowl games concluding the 2019 FBS football season. Sponsored by the SoFi personal finance company, the game was officially known as the SoFi Hawaii Bowl. This was also the final college football game at Aloha Stadium, as the stadium was closed to public events due to potential structural issues, and the game was moved to the Clarence T. C. Ching Athletics Complex starting in 2022 after the 2020 and 2021 editions were cancelled due to COVID-19 issues.

== Teams ==
The game was played between Hawaii of the Mountain West Conference, and BYU, an FBS independent. This was the 32nd meeting in this rivalry that dates back to 1930, and first in the postseason. Both teams were previously members of the Western Athletic Conference; BYU from 1962 to 1998, and Hawaii from 1979 to 2011. BYU led the rivalry series, 23–8.

=== Hawaii Rainbow Warriors ===
Hawaii entered the bowl with a 9–5 record (5–3 in conference). The Rainbow Warriors finished atop the West Division of the Mountain West Conference, with the same conference win–loss record as San Diego State, whom they defeated during the regular season. Hawaii accepted their bowl invitation following their loss to Boise State in the Mountain West Conference Football Championship Game. This was their third Hawaii Bowl appearance under head coach Nick Rolovich, having won in 2016 and lost in 2018. Overall, this was the 13th bowl game for Hawaii (ninth Hawaii Bowl), with a prior record of 6–6 (4–4 in prior Hawaii Bowls).

=== BYU Cougars ===
BYU entered the bowl with a 7–5 record, having started the season 2–4, then winning five consecutive games, and losing to San Diego State in their regular season finale. Led by head coach Kalani Sitake, the Cougars accepted an invitation to the Hawaii Bowl on November 16. This was BYU's first Hawaii Bowl appearance, and their second postseason game in Honolulu; they played in the 1992 Aloha Bowl, where they fell to Kansas by three points.

== Game summary ==
2019 SoFi Hawaii Bowl

Quarter	1	2	3	4	Total
Hawaii	14	17	0	7	38
BYU	7	17	7	3	34

at Aloha Stadium • Honolulu, Hawaii

- Date: Tuesday, December 24, 2019
- Game time: 8:00 p.m. EST (3:00 p.m. HST)
- Game weather: Partly cloudy • Temperature: 83 °F (28 °C) • Wind: S 11 mph
- Game attendance: 21,582
- Referee: Tim O'Dey
- TV announcers (ESPN): Jason Benetti (play-by-play), Rod Gilmore (analyst) and Quint Kessenich (sideline)
- ESPN game summary

Game information

First Quarter

- (7:32) HAW – Cole McDonald 7 yard pass to Jared Smart, Ryan Meskell kick (Drive: 10 plays, 82 yards, 5:09; Hawaii 7–0)
- (4:55) HAW – Cole McDonald 40 yard pass to Jared Smart, Ryan Meskell kick (Drive: 2 plays, 40 yards, 0:51; Hawaii 14–0)
- (0:54) BYU – Lopini Katoa 1 yard rush, Jake Oldroyd kick (Drive: 10 plays, 73 yards, 3:57; Hawaii 14–7)

Second Quarter

- (13:33) HAW – Cole McDonald 1 yard rush, Ryan Meskell kick (Drive: 6 plays, 78 yards, 2:17; Hawaii 21–7)
- (9:42) BYU – Zach Wilson 1 yard rush, Jake Oldroyd kick (Drive: 8 plays, 75 yards, 3:51; Hawaii 21–14)
- (5:50) HAW – Ryan Meskell 46 yard field goal (Drive: 9 plays, 49 yards, 3:46; Hawaii 24–14)
- (3:14) BYU – Micah Simon 11 yard rush, Jake Oldroyd kick (Drive: 7 plays, 75 yards, 2:34; Hawaii 24–21)
- (1:16) HAW – Cole McDonald 18 yard pass to Jason-Matthew Sharsh, Ryan Meskell kick (Drive: 9 plays, 71 yards, 1:55; Hawaii 31–21)
- (0:18) BYU – Jake Oldroyd 37 yard field goal (Drive: 8 plays, 50 yards, 0:58; Hawaii 31–24)

Third Quarter

- (11:58) BYU – Zach Wilson 2 yard rush, Jake Oldroyd kick (Drive: 2 plays, 6 yards, 0:39; Tied 31–31)

Fourth Quarter

- (14:37) BYU – Jake Oldroyd 20 yard field goal (Drive: 8 plays, 54 yards, 3:09; BYU 34–31)
- (1:17) HAW – Cole McDonald 24 yard pass to Nick Mardner, Ryan Meskell kick (Drive: 4 plays, 71 yards, 0:44; Hawaii 38–34)

=== Statistics ===
Statistics	HAW	BYU
First downs	19	29
Plays–yards	74–495	81–505
Rushes–yards	27–2	40–231
Passing yards	493	274
Passing: comp–att–int	28–47–0	24–41–1
Turnovers		
Time of possession	29:29	30:31

Team	Category	Player	Statistics
Hawaii	Passing	Cole McDonald	28/47, 493 yards, 4 TD
Hawaii	Rushing	Miles Reed	10 carries, 17 yards
Hawaii	Receiving	JoJo Ward	7 receptions, 159 yards
BYU	Passing	Zach Wilson	24/40, 274 yards, 2 INT
BYU	Rushing	Tyler Allgeier	8 carries, 77 yards
BYU	Receiving	Matt Bushman	6 receptions, 91 yards
