= AlarmForce =

Home security and automation systems manufacturer and provider

AlarmForce Industries Inc.
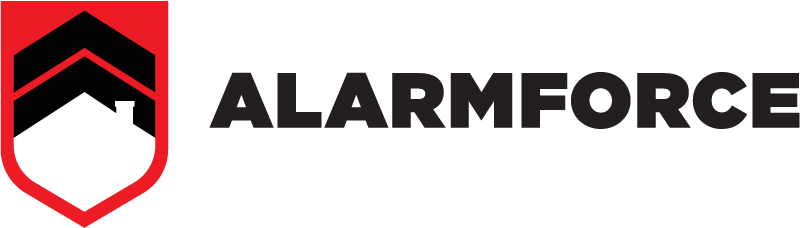
- Type: Subsidiary
- Industry: Home security Home automation
- Founded: 1988; 38 years ago
- Area served: Canada
- Key people: Joel Orvis; Vice President - Connected Home
- Revenue: ▲CAD$ 56.14 million (2015)
- Operating income: ▼CAD$ 6.31 million (2015)
- Net income: ▼CAD$ 4.98 million (2015)
- Total assets: ▲CAD$ 41.14 million (2015)
- Total equity: ▲CAD$ 32.31 million (2015)
- Number of employees: 240+
- Parent: BCE Inc.
- Website: alarmforce.com

AlarmForce Industries Inc. is a Toronto-based home security and home automation systems manufacturer and provider. AlarmForce operates in the residential and commercial security segment.

Alarmforce is currently a subsidiary of BCE Inc., who announced its acquisition of the company in November 2017.

== History ==
The company was founded in 1988 by Joel Matlin, who was the president and CEO until July 2013, when he was dismissed by the Board of Directors. In May 2015, AlarmForce appointed Graham Badun as its president and CEO.

The company launched a two way voice alarm system called AlarmVoice in 1991. This was followed by the launch of AlarmPlus in 2000, and in early 2008, the personal emergency response system AlarmCare. In October 2011, AlarmForce launched VideoRelay, a video surveillance system with live two-way voice. In 2014, AlarmForce Connect was launched giving users the ability to control their alarm system remotely from their smartphone.

In November 2004, AlarmForce began its US expansion with its entry to the state of North Carolina. In December 2006, AlarmForce entered Ohio and this was followed by entry into Georgia, in 2007. In 2010, AlarmForce entered the state of Minnesota. In April 2011, the home alarm company expanded into the State of Florida. Through to July 2017, AlarmForce serviced 11 major US centers located in Charlotte, Raleigh-Durham, Greensboro, Columbus, Cincinnati, Cleveland, Atlanta, Minneapolis-Saint Paul, Tampa Bay-St.Petersburg, Sarasota and Orlando.

In July 2017, Alarmforce divested its U.S. customers to Select Security for US$11.6 million.

On November 6, 2017, BCE Inc. announced that it had agreed to purchase AlarmForce for $166 million. Upon its completion of the purchase, Bell announced the sale of 39,000 AlarmForce customers in Western Canada to Telus for $66.5 million, leaving AlarmForce to focus on Eastern Canada.
