= Matlin =

Matlin may refer to:

== Places ==
- Matlin, Utah, ghost town in the northeastern end of the Great Salt Lake Desert, Utah, United States

== Other uses ==
- Matlin Patterson Global Advisors, a global distressed securities fund
- Matlin (surname)

== See also ==
- Mary Matalin (born 1953) U.S. politician
