= JoJo Ward =

American football player (born 1997)

No. 9, 14
- Position: Wide receiver

Personal information
- Born: December 9, 1997 (age 28); Waco, Texas, U.S.
- Listed height: 5 ft 9 in (1.75 m)
- Listed weight: 175 lb (79 kg)

Career information
- High school: Midway (Waco)
- College: Hawaii
- NFL draft: 2020: undrafted

Career history
- Arizona Cardinals (2020–2021)*; Cleveland Browns (2021)*; Houston Gamblers (2022); Ottawa Redblacks (2023)*
- * Offseason or practice squad member only

Joseph "JoJo" Ward (born December 9, 1997) is an American former professional football wide receiver. Ward played college football for the Hawaii Rainbow Warriors. He was a member of the Arizona Cardinals, Cleveland Browns, Houston Gamblers, and Ottawa Redblacks.

== Early life ==
Ward attended Midway High School, where he was named the District 12-6A offensive MVP as a senior.

== College career ==
Ward played at Tyler Junior College in Tyler, Texas, where he racked up over 1,000 yards receiving and nine touchdowns in two seasons. He joined the Hawaii roster in July 2018 at the last minute as a walk-on.

Ward was named to the Earl Campbell Award watchlist before the start of the 2019 season, and was named its national player of the week in week 2 of the season, where he caught ten passes for 189 yards and all four of Hawaii's touchdowns against Oregon State. He also was named the Mountain West Offensive Player of the Week for the same performance.

=== College statistics ===
Year	Team	Class	GP	Receiving				Kick returns				Punt returns			
Year	Team	Class	GP	Rec	Yds	Avg	TD	Ret	Yds	Avg	TD	Ret	Yds	Avg	TD
2018	Hawaii	Junior	14	51	865	17.0	9	0	0	0	0	3	13	4.3	0
2019	Hawaii	Senior	14	65	1134	17.4	11	2	31	15.5	0	3	1	0.3	0
Career			28	116	1999	17.2	20	2	31	15.5	0	6	14	2.3	0

== Professional career ==
=== Arizona Cardinals ===
After going undrafted in the 2020 NFL draft, Ward signed with the Arizona Cardinals on April 25, 2020. On September 5, 2020, Ward was waived during final roster cuts. He was re-signed to the practice squad a day later. He signed a reserve/future contract on January 5, 2021. He was waived on August 16, 2021.

=== Cleveland Browns ===
On August 19, 2021, Ward signed with the Cleveland Browns. Ward was waived by the Browns on August 20, 2021.

=== Houston Gamblers ===
Ward was drafted by the Houston Gamblers of the United States Football League (USFL) in the 14th round of the 2022 USFL draft. He was transferred to the team's inactive roster on April 22, 2022. He was moved back to the active roster on May 20. He was released on April 4, 2023.

=== Ottawa Redblacks ===
On April 27, 2023, Ward signed with the Ottawa Redblacks of the Canadian Football League (CFL). He was released by the Redblacks during the first week of training camp on May 16, 2023.
