= 2019 Hawaii Rainbow Warriors football team =

American college football season

2019 Hawaii Rainbow Warriors football

MW West Division co-champion Hawaii Bowl champion

MW Championship Game, L 10–31 vs. Boise State

Hawaii Bowl, W 38–34 vs. BYU
- Conference: Mountain West Conference
- West Division
- Record: 10–5 (5–3 MW)
- Head coach: Nick Rolovich (4th season)
- Offensive coordinator: Brian Smith (3rd season)
- Offensive scheme: Run and shoot
- Defensive coordinator: Corey Batoon (2nd season)
- Base defense: 4–2–5
- Home stadium: Aloha Stadium

2019 Mountain West Conference football standings
	Conf.			Overall
Team	W		L	W		L
Mountain Division
No. 23 Boise State xy$	8	–	0	12	–	2
No. 22 Air Force	7	–	1	11	–	2
Utah State	6	–	2	7	–	6
Wyoming	4	–	4	8	–	5
Colorado State	3	–	5	4	–	8
New Mexico	0	–	8	2	–	10
West Division
Hawaii xy	5	–	3	10	–	5
San Diego State x	5	–	3	10	–	3
Nevada	4	–	4	7	–	6
San Jose State	2	–	6	5	–	7
UNLV	2	–	6	4	–	8
Fresno State	2	–	6	4	–	8
Championship: Boise State 31, Hawaii 10
$ – Conference champion; x – Division champion/co-champions; y – Championship game participant; Rankings from AP Poll

The 2019 Hawaii Rainbow Warriors football team represented the University of Hawaii at Manoa in the 2019 NCAA Division I FBS football season. The Rainbow Warriors played their home games at Aloha Stadium in Honolulu. They competed in the West Division of the Mountain West Conference and were led by fourth-year head coach Nick Rolovich, in what was his final season before his abrupt resignation in January 2020.

The Rainbow Warriors had their most successful season since 2010. They finished 10–5, 5–3 to finish tied for first in the West Division, claiming the division championship with a 14–11 win over San Diego State. They advanced to the Mountain West Championship, where they lost to Boise State, but won the Hawaii Bowl over BYU, 38–34.

This was Hawaii's first ten-win season since 2010, and just the seventh in program history. Nick Rolovich was also named Mountain West Coach of the Year, the fourth UH coach to receive that honor.

== Preseason ==
=== Award watch lists ===
Listed in the order that they were released

Award	Player	Position	Year
Maxwell Award	Cole McDonald	QB	JR
Davey O'Brien Award	Cole McDonald	QB	JR
Doak Walker Award	Dayton Furuta	RB	SR
Fred Biletnikoff Award	Cedric Byrd II	WR	SR
Fred Biletnikoff Award	JoJo Ward	WR	SR
Rimington Trophy	Kohl Levao	C	SR
Lou Groza Award	Ryan Meskell	K	SR
Wuerffel Trophy	Kaimana Padello	DL	SR
Polynesian College Football Player of the Year	Dayton Furuta	RB	SR
Polynesian College Football Player of the Year	Kohl Levao	OL	SR
Polynesian College Football Player of the Year	Solomon Matautia	LB	SR
Polynesian College Football Player of the Year	Kaimana Padello	DL	JR
Polynesian College Football Player of the Year	Penei Pavihi	LB	JR
Polynesian College Football Player of the Year	Solo Vaipulu	OL	SO
Johnny Unitas Golden Arm Award	Cole McDonald	QB	JR
Manning Award	Cole McDonald	QB	JR

=== Mountain West media days ===
The Mountain West media days were held from July 23–24, 2019 at Green Valley Ranch in Henderson, NV.

==== Media poll ====
The preseason poll was released at the Mountain West media days on July 23, 2019. The Warriors were predicted to finish in fourth place in the MW West Division with one first place vote.

==== Preseason All-Mountain West Team ====
The Warriors had one player selected to the preseason All−Mountain West Team.

Offense

Cedric Byrd II – WR

== Schedule ==
Date	Time	Opponent	Site	TV	Result	Attendance
August 24	4:30 p.m.	Arizona*	Aloha Stadium; Honolulu, HI	CBSSN	W 45–38	22,396
September 7	6:00 p.m.	Oregon State*	Aloha Stadium; Honolulu, HI	SPEC HI	W 31–28	26,807
September 14	1:30 p.m.	at No. 23 Washington*	Husky Stadium; Seattle, WA	P12N	L 20–52	67,589
September 21	6:00 p.m.	No. 14 (FCS) Central Arkansas*^{†}	Aloha Stadium; Honolulu, HI	SPEC HI	W 35–16	23,465
September 28	4:30 p.m.	at Nevada	Mackay Stadium; Reno, NV	ESPN2	W 54–3	15,137
October 12	4:15 p.m.	at No. 14 Boise State	Albertsons Stadium; Boise, ID	ESPN2	L 37–59	36,902
October 19	5:00 p.m.	Air Force	Aloha Stadium; Honolulu, HI (Kuter Trophy)	CBSSN	L 26–56	23,757
October 26	10:00 a.m.	at New Mexico	Dreamstyle Stadium; Albuquerque, NM	SPEC HI	W 45–31	12,617
November 2	6:00 p.m.	Fresno State	Aloha Stadium; Honolulu, HI (Golden Screwdriver Trophy)	SPEC HI	L 38–41	22,058
November 9	6:00 p.m.	San Jose State	Aloha Stadium; Honolulu, HI (Dick Tomey Legacy Game)	SPEC HI	W 42–40	19,858
November 16	11:00 a.m.	at UNLV	Sam Boyd Stadium; Whitney, NV (Island Showdown Series)	SPEC HI	W 21–7	21,317
November 23	6:00 p.m.	San Diego State	Aloha Stadium; Honolulu, HI	SPEC HI	W 14–11	24,911
November 30	7:30 p.m.	Army*	Aloha Stadium; Honolulu, HI	CBSSN	W 52–31	26,256
December 7	11:00 a.m.	at No. 19 Boise State	Albertsons Stadium; Boise, ID (MW Championship Game)	ESPN	L 10–31	23,561
December 24	3:00 p.m.	BYU*	Aloha Stadium; Honolulu, HI (Hawaii Bowl)	ESPN	W 38–34	21,582
*Non-conference game; ^{†}Homecoming; Rankings from AP Poll and College Football Playoff Rankings after November 5 released prior to game; All times are in Hawaii time

== Personnel ==
2019 Hawaii Rainbow Warriors football team roster
Players
Coaches
Offense

Pos.	#	Name	Class
WR	3	Jason-Matthew Sharsh (C)	Sr
WR	4	Kumoku Noa	Jr
WR	6	Cedric Byrd II	Sr
RB	7	Dayton Furuta (C)	Sr
WR	9	JoJo Ward	Sr
QB	11	Justin Uahinui	So
QB	12	Chevan Cordeiro	Fr
QB	13	Cole McDonald	Jr
WR	14	James Phillips	So
WR	15	Jonah Panoke	Fr
QB	16	Zach Daniel	Fr
QB	18	Boone Abbott	Fr
QB	19	Kamaliʻi Akina	Jr
RB	21	Fred Holly III	Jr
WR	23	Jared Smart	Jr
RB	26	Miles Reed	So
RB	34	KK Padello	Sr
WR	35	Jaden Allen	Fr
WR	38	Keliam Brunn	Fr
RB	44	Hekili Keliiliki	So
OL	52	Solo Vaipulu	So
OL	53	Ramsey Aviu	So
OL	55	Micah Vanterpool	So
OL	57	J. R. Hensley	Sr
OL	58	Joey Nuʻuanu-Kuhiʻiki	Jr
OL	60	Caden Hilborn	Fr
OL	61	Eliki Tanuvasa	So
OL	63	Taaga Tuulima	Jr
OL	64	Kauka Umiamaka	Fr
OL	65	Elias Wong	Fr
OL	67	Bubba Waʻa	Fr
OL	68	Ra Elkington	So
OL	70	Arasi Mose	Fr
OL	72	Kohl Levao (injured)	Sr
OL	74	Gene Pryor	Jr
OL	75	Ilm Manning	So
OL	76	Michael Eletise	Jr
OL	77	Alesana Sunia	Jr
OL	78	Ernest Moore	Jr
WR	80	Mekel Ealy	Fr
WR	81	Grey Ihu	Jr
WR	84	Nick Mardner	Fr
WR	85	Lincoln Victor	Fr
WR	86	Chance Byer	Fr
WR	87	Robert Funkhouser	Fr
WR	88	John Johnson	Jr
OL	89	Emil Graves	Sr

Defense

Pos.	#	Name	Class
LB	1	Penei Pavihi	Jr
LB	2	Jeremiah Pritchard	Jr
DB	3	Kalen Hicks	Sr
DB	4	Rojesterman Farris II	Sr
DB	5	Khoury Bethley	So
DB	8	Eugene Ford	Jr
DL	10	Mark Blocker II	Fr
DB	11	Justice Augafa	Sr
LB	12	Kanaʻi Picanco	Sr
LB	15	Paul Scott	So
LB	17	Isaiah Tufaga	So
DB	18	Cortez Davis	Jr
DB	20	Zach Wilson	Jr
DB	21	Michael Washington	Fr
DB	22	Ikem Okeke	Sr
DB	23	Akil Francisco	So
DB	24	Kai Kaneshiro	Fr
DB	25	Travon Killins	Fr
DB	26	Leonard Lee	Jr
LB	27	Solomon Matautia	Sr
DB	28	Nalu Emerson	Fr
DB	29	Donovan Dalton	So
DL	30	Kamuela Borden	So
DB	31	Tiger Peterson	Fr
DB	33	Steven Fiso	Fr
DB	34	James Green III	Fr
DL	35	Jeffery Keene	Sr
LB	36	Hoku Arias	Fr
DB	37	Alakaʻi Mashima	So
DB	38	Brody Padilla	So
DB	39	Kalamaku Kuewa	Fr
DL	40	Chance Kalaugher	Jr
DL	42	Jonah Kahahawai-Welch	Fr
DL	43	Mason Vega	Jr
LB	45	Payton Awaya	So
LB	46	Tauivi Ho Ching	Jr
DB	47	Noa Kamana	So
DL	48	Derek Thomas	Jr
DL	49	Manly Williams	Sr
DL	50	Justus Tavai	So
DL	51	Makai Manuwai	Jr
LB	53	Darius Muasau	Fr
LB	54	Kalani Kamakawiwoʻole	Fr
DL	55	Blessman Taʻala	So
LB	56	Zach Bowers	Fr
LB	57	Parker Higgins	Jr
LB	58	Kila Kamakawiwoʻole	Fr
DL	59	Andrew Choi	Fr
LB	61	Wesley Faagau	Jr
DL	62	Doug Russell	So
DL	66	Eperone Moananu	Sr
DL	69	Azia Seʻei (C)	Sr
DL	71	Stephan Bernal-Wendt	So
DL	79	Samson Siilata	Fr
DL	90	Fanupo Peapealalo	Sr
DL	91	Samiuela Akoteu	Sr
DL	92	DJuan Matthews	Jr
DL	93	Mason Mataafa	Jr
DL	94	Alema Kapoi	So
DL	95	Kendall Hune	Sr
DL	96	Kaimana Padello (C)	Sr
DL	97	Zach Ritner	Fr
DL	98	Foi Shaw	Fr
DL	99	Jonah Laulu	Fr

Special teams

Pos.	#	Name	Class
P	9	Stan Gaudion	Jr
PK	17	Ryan Meskell	Sr
P	36	Ben Scruton	Sr
LS	44	Wyatt Tucker	So
PK	52	Michael Boyle	Fr

Head coach

- Nick Rolovich (Hawaiʻi)

Coordinators/assistant coaches

- Brian Smith (Hawaiʻi)
  Associate head coach/offensive coordinator/running backs
- Mark Banker (Springfield)
  Assistant head coach/inside linebackers
- Corey Batoon (Long Beach State)
  Defensive coordinator/safeties
- Michael Ghobrial (UCLA)
  Special teams coordinator
- Craig Stutzmann (Hawaiʻi)
  Passing Game Coordinator/quarterbacks
- Mark Weber (Cal Lutheran)
  Offensive line
- Andre Allen (Ashford)
  Wide receivers
- Ricky Logo (NC State)
  Defensive line
- Abe Elimimian (Hawaiʻi)
  Cornerbacks
- Jacob Yoro (Hawaiʻi)
  Outside linebackers

Support staff

- Dwain Bradshaw (Arizona State)
  Director of Football Athletic Performance
- Jason Cvercko (Connecticut)
  Chief of Staff
- Olivia Vea (Hawaiʻi)
  Video Coordinator
- Rafael Aguilar (Sacramento State)
  Graduate Assistant (Defensive line)
- Brodie Nakama (Hawaiʻi)
  Graduate Assistant (Special Teams)
- Vaʻa Niumatalolo (BYU)
  Graduate Assistant (Offensive line)
- Jack Perez (Pacific (OR))
  Graduate Assistant (Linebackers)
- Woody Blevins (Colorado Mesa)
  Defensive Quality Control
- Kolney Cassel (Sacramento State)
  Offensive Quality Control
- Johnnie Mack (Texas Tech)
  Offensive Quality Control
- Ryan Matviko (Mercyhurst)
  Defensive Quality Control
- Myles Gota
  Director of Football Operations
- Josh Omura
  Recruiting Quality Control
- Josh Elms
  Strength Coach
- Brian Wong
  Football Athletic Trainer
- Al Ginoza
  Equipment Manager
- Brandon Devie
  Equipment Manager
- Skyena Antolin
  Football Manager
- Courtney Tsumoto
  Academic Advisor
- Derek Inouchi
  Media Relations Director/Football Contact
- Neal Iwamoto
  Asst. Media Relations Director/Football Contact #2

Legend

- (C) Team captain
- (S) Suspended
- (I) Ineligible
- Injured
- Redshirt

Roster
Last update: December 23, 2019

=== Depth chart ===
Defense

NB
Eugene Ford
Kai Kaneshiro

FS
Ikem Okeke
Eugene Ford

LB	LB
Jeremiah Pritchard	Solomon Matautia
Darius Muasau	Paul Scott

SS
Khoury Bethley
Donovan Dalton

CB
Rojesterman Farris II
Zach Wilson OR James Green III

DE	DT	DT	DE
Manly Williams	Azia Seʻei	Kendall Hune	Samiuela Akoteu
Derek Thomas	Eperone Moananu	Blessman Taʻala	Jonah Laulu

CB
Cortez Davis
Akil Francisco

Offense

WR
Jared Smart
Mekel Ealy

WR
Jason-Matthew Sharsh
Lincoln Victor

LT	LG	C	RG	RT
Ilm Manning	Michael Eletise	Taaga Tuulima	Solo Vaipulu	Gene Pryor
Ernest Moore	Arasi Mose	Kohl Levao	Bubba Waʻa	Joey Nuʻuanu-Kuhiʻiki

WR
Cedric Byrd II
Robert Funkhouser

WR
JoJo Ward
Nick Mardner

QB
Cole McDonald
Chevan Cordeiro

RB
Miles Reed
Dayton Furuta

Special teams
PK Ryan Meskell
P Stan Gaudion OR Ben Scruton
KR Lincoln Victor
PR Cedric Byrd II OR JoJo Ward
LS Wyatt Tucker
H Stan Gaudion

== Game summaries ==
=== Arizona ===
Arizona Wildcats at Hawaii Rainbow Warriors

Quarter	1	2	3	4	Total
Wildcats	0	21	14	3	38
Rainbow Warriors	14	14	7	10	45

at Aloha Stadium, Honolulu, HI

- Date: August 24, 2019
- Game time: 4:30 p.m. HST
- Game weather: Temperature: 88 °F (31 °C) • Wind: ENE 13 mph • Weather: Mostly Sunny, Humid
- Game attendance: 22,396
- Referee: Brandon Cruse
- TV announcers (CBSSN): Carter Blackburn (play-by-play), Aaron Taylor (analyst), Rick Neuheisel (analyst), & Jenny Dell (sideline)
- ESPN – Byrd's 4 TD night leads Hawaii past Arizona 45–38 /// Box Score, Arizona at Hawaii /// Pregame Notes /// Postgame Notes

Game information

First Quarter

- (09:22) HAW TD – Cedric Byrd II 7-yard pass from Cole McDonald, Ryan Meskell kick
  Drive: 7 plays, 51 yards, 2:51; Hawaii 7–0
- (04:54) HAW TD – JoJo Ward 39-yard pass from Cole McDonald, Ryan Meskell kick
  Drive: 5 plays, 62 yards, 3:12; Hawaii 14–0

Second Quarter

- (14:23) ARIZ TD – Bryce Wolma 14-yard pass from Khalil Tate, Lucas Havrisik kick
  Drive: 7 plays, 49 yards, 2:00; Hawaii 14–7
- (09:50) HAW TD – Cedric Byrd II 25-yard pass from Cole McDonald, Ryan Meskell kick
  Drive: 10 plays, 75 yards, 4:33; Hawaii 21–7
- (08:00) ARIZ TD – Nathan Tilford 1-yard rush, Lucas Havrisik kick
  Drive: 6 plays, 77 yards, 1:45; Hawaii 21–14
- (01:47) ARIZ TD – Jamarye Joiner 27-yard pass from Khalil Tate, Lucas Havrisik kick
  Drive: 4 plays, 76 yards, 1:01; Tied 21–21
- (00:28) HAW TD – Cedric Byrd II 35-yard pass from Cole McDonald, Ryan Meskell kick
  Drive: 4 plays, 75 yards, 1:19; Hawaii 28–21

Third Quarter

- (11:02) HAW TD – Dayton Furuta 3-yard rush, Ryan Meskell kick
  Drive: 4 plays, 78 yards, 1:42; Hawaii 35–21
- (04:23) ARIZ TD – J. J. Taylor 24-yard rush, Lucas Havrisik kick
  Drive: 8 plays, 68 yards, 2:36; Hawaii 35–28
- (00:51) ARIZ TD – Stanley Berryhill 21 yard pass from Khalil Tate, Lucas Havrisik kick
  Drive: 4 plays, 52 yards, 1:42; Tied 35–35

Fourth Quarter

- (10:39) HAW FG – Ryan Meskell 34-yard field goal
  Drive: 10 plays, 51 yards, 5:05; Hawaii 38–35
- (05:02) HAW TD – Cedric Byrd II 30-yard pass from Chevan Cordeiro, Ryan Meskell kick
  Drive: 4 plays, 48 yards, 2:30; Hawaii 45–35
- (03:53) ARIZ FG – Lucas Havrisik 53-yard field goal
  Drive: 5 plays, 40 yards, 1:09; Hawaii 45–38

Passing

- ARIZ – Khalil Tate: 22/39, 361 yards, 3 TD, 2 INT
- HAW – Cole McDonald: 29/41, 378 yards, 4 TD, 4 INT

Rushing

- ARIZ – Khalil Tate: 13 carries, 108 yards
- HAW – Dayton Furuta: 5 carries, 42 yards, 1 TD

Receiving

- ARIZ – Stanley Berryhill : 3 receptions, 92 yards, 1 TD
- HAW – Cedric Byrd II: 14 receptions, 224 yards, 4 TD

=== Oregon State ===
Oregon State Beavers at Hawaii Rainbow Warriors

Quarter	1	2	3	4	Total
Beavers	14	14	0	0	28
Rainbow Warriors	7	14	7	3	31

at Aloha Stadium, Honolulu, HI

- Date: September 7, 2019
- Game time: 6:00 p.m. HST
- Game weather: Temperature: 86 °F (30 °C) • Wind: NE 17 mph • Weather: 57% Humidity
- Game attendance: 26,807
- Referee: Kevin Mar
- TV announcers (SPEC HI / Stadium): Robert Kekaula (play-by-play), Rich Miano (analyst), & Scott Robbs (sideline)
- ESPN – Ward, Meskell's late FG help Hawaii beat Oregon State 31–28 /// Box Score, Oregon State at Hawaii /// Pregame Notes /// Postgame Notes

Game information

First Quarter

- (07:44) OSU TD – Jermar Jefferson 4-yard run, Jordan Choukair kick
  Drive: 6 plays, 71 yards, 2:24; Oregon State 7–0
- (06:54) HAW TD – JoJo Ward 29-yard pass from Cole McDonald, Ryan Meskell kick
  Drive: 2 plays, 35 yards, 0:41; Tied 7–7
- (04:12) OSU TD – Artavis Pierce 37-yard run, Jordan Choukair kick
  Drive: 6 plays, 60 yards, 2:33; Oregon State 14–7

Second Quarter

- (12:42) OSU TD – Isaiah Hodgins 13-yard pass from Jake Luton, Jordan Choukair kick
  Drive: 12 plays, 66 yards, 5:06; Oregon State 21–7
- (11:00) HAW TD – JoJo Ward 35-yard pass from Cole McDonald, Ryan Meskell kick
  Drive: 5 plays, 75 yards, 1:42; Oregon State 21–14
- (02:25) OSU TD – Artavis Pierce 25-yard run, Jordan Choukair kick
  Drive: 6 plays, 85 yards, 2:17; Oregon State 28–14
- (00:12) HAW TD – JoJo Ward 5-yard pass from Cole McDonald, Ryan Meskell kick
  Drive: 11 plays, 70 yards, 2:07; Oregon State 28–21

Third Quarter

- (07:05) HAW TD – JoJo Ward 29-yard pass from Cole McDonald, Ryan Meskell kick
  Drive: 4 plays, 80 yards, 1:44; Tied 28–28

Fourth Quarter

- (02:17) HAW FG – Ryan Meskell 28-yard field goal
  Drive: 6 plays, 24 yards, 2:01; Hawaii 31–28

Passing

- OSU – Jake Luton: 15/32, 169 yards, 1 TD
- HAW – Cole McDonald: 30/52, 421 yards, 4 TD, 1 INT

Rushing

- OSU – Jermar Jefferson: 31 carries, 183 yards, 1 TD
- HAW – Miles Reed: 11 carries, 42 yards

Receiving

- OSU – Isaiah Hodgins: 7 receptions, 96 yards, 1 TD
- HAW – JoJo Ward: 10 receptions, 189 yards, 4 TD

=== At Washington ===
Hawaii Rainbow Warriors at No. 23 Washington Huskies

Quarter	1	2	3	4	Total
Rainbow Warriors	0	7	13	0	20
No. 23 Huskies	21	17	0	14	52

at Husky Stadium, Seattle, WA

- Date: September 14, 2019
- Game time: 4:30 p.m. PDT
- Game weather: Temperature: 66 °F (19 °C) • Wind: S 9 mph • Weather: Cloudy
- Game attendance: 67,589
- Referee: Mike McCabe
- TV announcers (P12N): Ted Robinson (play-by-play), Yogi Roth (analyst), & Lewis Johnson (sideline)
- ESPN – Eason throws 3 TDs, No. 23 Washington beats Hawaii 52–20 /// Box Score, Hawaii at No. 23 Washington /// Pregame Notes /// Postgame Notes

Game information

First Quarter

- (13:44) WASH TD – Hunter Bryant 47-yard pass from Jacob Eason, Peyton Henry kick
  Drive: 3 plays, 76 yards, 1:16; Washington 7–0
- (11:36) WASH TD – Sean McGrew 22-yard rush, Peyton Henry kick
  Drive: 5 plays, 42 yards, 1:27; Washington 14–0
- (06:02) WASH TD – Puka Nacua 28-yard pass from Jacob Eason, Peyton Henry kick
  Drive: 6 plays, 72 yards, 2:44; Washington 21–0

Second Quarter

- (13:32) WASH TD – Aaron Fuller 37-yard pass from Jacob Eason, Peyton Henry kick
  Drive: 5 plays, 60 yards, 1:21; Washington 28–0
- (07:45) WASH TD – Richard Newton 5-yard rush, Peyton Henry kick
  Drive: 5 plays, 69 yards, 1:58; Washington 35–0
- (03:27) WASH FG – Peyton Henry 23-yard field goal
  Drive: 7 plays, 28 yards, 2:58; Washington 38–0
- (00:39) HAW TD – Miles Reed 0-yard fumble recovery, Ryan Meskell kick
  Drive: 9 plays, 82 yards, 2:43; Washington 38–7

Third Quarter

- (09:16) HAW TD – Miles Reed 7-yard rush, Ryan Meskell kick
  Drive: 14 plays, 93 yards, 5:43; Washington 38–14
- (01:56) HAW TD – Cedric Byrd II 4-yard pass from Cole McDonald, Cole McDonald rush failed
  Drive: 14 plays, 53 yards, 6:21; Washington 38–20

Fourth Quarter

- (12:02) WASH TD – Richard Newton 1-yard rush, Peyton Henry kick
  Drive: 11 plays, 75 yards, 4:54; Washington 45–20
- (08:13) WASH TD – Richard Newton 8-yard rush, Peyton Henry kick
  Drive: 6 plays, 31 yards, 3:04; Washington 52–20

Passing

- HAW – Cole McDonald: 22/35, 218 yards, 1 TD, 3 INT
- WASH – Jacob Eason: 18/25, 262 yards, 3 TD

Rushing

- HAW – Miles Reed: 15 carries, 70 yards, 2 TD
- WASH – Salvon Ahmed: 8 carries, 83 yards

Receiving

- HAW – Cedric Byrd II: 6 receptions, 72 yards, 1 TD
- WASH – Hunter Bryant: 5 receptions, 115 yards, 1 TD

=== Central Arkansas ===
No. 14 (FCS) Central Arkansas Bears at Hawaii Rainbow Warriors

Quarter	1	2	3	4	Total
No. 14 (FCS) Bears	0	9	0	7	16
Rainbow Warriors	14	14	0	7	35

at Aloha Stadium, Honolulu, HI

- Date: September 21, 2019
- Game time: 6:00 p.m. HST
- Game weather: Temperature: 80 °F (27 °C) • Wind: NE 12 mph • Weather: Partly Cloudy, 70% Humidity
- Game attendance: 23,465
- Referee: Scott Campbell
- TV announcers (SPEC HI / Stadium): Robert Kekaula (play-by-play), Rich Miano (analyst), & Scott Robbs (sideline)
- ESPN – McDonald's 4 TD passes help Hawaii beat Central Arkansas /// Box Score, Central Arkansas at Hawaii /// Pregame Notes /// Postgame Notes

Game information

First Quarter

- (08:48) HAW TD – Kai Kaneshiro 55-yard interception return, Ryan Meskell kick
  Drive: 0 plays, 0 yards, 0:00; Hawaii 7–0
- (01:52) HAW TD – JoJo Ward 5-yard pass from Cole McDonald, Ryan Meskell kick
  Drive: 7 plays, 63 yards, 4:01; Hawaii 14–0

Second Quarter

- (14:28) HAW TD – Jared Smart 16-yard pass from Cole McDonald, Ryan Meskell kick
  Drive: 4 plays, 44 yards, 1:23; Hawaii 21–0
- (07:53) HAW TD – Cedric Byrd II 13-yard pass from Cole McDonald, Ryan Meskell kick
  Drive: 7 plays, 77 yards, 3:29; Hawaii 28–0
- (04:14) UCA TD – Sam Camargo 4-yard pass from Carlos Blackman, Hayden Ray kick blocked
  Drive: 7 plays, 67 yards, 3:31; Hawaii 28–6
- (00:10) UCA FG – Hayden Ray 35-yard field goal
  Drive: 4 plays, −6 yards, 0:26; Hawaii 28–9

Third Quarter
No scoring
Fourth Quarter

- (12:18) UCA TD – Carlos Blackman 23-yard rush, Hayden Ray kick
  Drive: 10 plays, 82 yards, 5:27; Hawaii 28–16
- (03:27) HAW TD – Lincoln Victor 11-yard pass from Cole McDonald, Ryan Meskell kick
  Drive: 12 plays, 89 yards, 6:33; Hawaii 35–16

Passing

- UCA – Breylin Smith: 28/51, 185 yards, 1 INT
- HAW – Cole McDonald: 25/32, 300 yards, 4 TD, 1 INT

Rushing

- UCA – Carlos Blackman: 17 carries, 147 yards, 1 TD
- HAW – Miles Reed: 10 carries, 60 yards

Receiving

- UCA – Lujuan Winningham: 8 receptions, 53 yards
- HAW – Jared Smart: 8 receptions, 121 yards, 1 TD

=== At Nevada ===
Hawaii Rainbow Warriors at Nevada Wolf Pack

Quarter	1	2	3	4	Total
Rainbow Warriors	7	24	14	9	54
Wolf Pack	0	3	0	0	3

at Mackay Stadium, Reno, NV

- Date: September 28, 2019
- Game time: 4:30 p.m. PDT
- Game weather: Temperature: 39 °F (4 °C) • Wind: N 9 mph • Weather: Rain, Cool
- Game attendance: 15,137
- Referee: Michael VanderVelde
- TV announcers (ESPN2): Clay Matvick (play-by-play) & Ryan Leaf (analyst)
- ESPN – McDonald, Byrd help Hawaii cruise to 54–3 win over Nevada /// Box Score, Hawaii at Nevada /// Pregame Notes /// Postgame Notes

Game information

First Quarter

- (08:17) HAW TD – Cedric Byrd II 36-yard pass from Cole McDonald, Ryan Meskell kick
  Drive: 5 plays, 62 yards, 2:19; Hawaii 7–0

Second Quarter

- (10:40) HAW TD – Cedric Byrd II 2-yard pass from Cole McDonald, Ryan Meskell kick
  Drive: 9 plays, 80 yards, 4:22; Hawaii 14–0
- (09:11) HAW TD – Justice Augafa 2-yard punt return (blocked), Ryan Meskell kick
  Drive: 0 plays, 0 yards, 0:00; Hawaii 21–0
- (05:33) HAW TD – Miles Reed 9-yard rush, Ryan Meskell kick
  Drive: 3 plays, 47 yards, 1:22; Hawaii 28–0
- (00:36) NEV FG – Brandon Talton 36-yard field goal
  Drive: 14 plays, 61 yards, 4:53; Hawaii 28–3
- (00:02) HAW FG – Ryan Meskell 44-yard field goal
  Drive: 5 plays, 45 yards, 0:28; Hawaii 31–3

Third Quarter

- (11:02) HAW TD – Jason-Matthew Sharsh 12-yard pass from Cole McDonald, Ryan Meskell kick
  Drive: 5 plays, 63 yards, 2:26; Hawaii 38–3
- (02:57) HAW TD – Cedric Byrd II 20-yard pass from Cole McDonald, Ryan Meskell kick
  Drive: 8 plays, 80 yards, 3:52; Hawaii 45–3

Fourth Quarter

- (09:20) HAW SF – TEAM safety
  Drive: 0 plays, 0 yards, 0:00; Hawaii 47–3
- (03:42) HAW TD – Robert Funkhouser 14-yard pass from Justin Uahinui, Ryan Meskell kick
  Drive: 9 plays, 75 yards, 5:33; Hawaii 54–3

Passing

- HAW – Cole McDonald: 25/30, 312 yards, 4 TD
- NEV – Cristian Solano: 11/17, 59 yards, 1 INT

Rushing

- HAW – Fred Holly III: 11 carries, 63 yards
- NEV – Toa Taua: 17 carries, 72 yards

Receiving

- HAW – Jason-Matthew Sharsh: 9 receptions, 123 yards, 1 TD
- NEV – Elijah Cooks: 5 receptions, 38 yards

=== At Boise State ===
Hawaii Rainbow Warriors at No. 14 Boise State Broncos

Quarter	1	2	3	4	Total
Rainbow Warriors	7	7	7	16	37
No. 14 Broncos	14	17	21	7	59

at Albertsons Stadium, Boise, ID

- Date: October 12, 2019
- Game time: 8:15 p.m. MDT
- Game weather: Temperature: 53 °F (12 °C) • Wind: N 5 mph • Weather: Partly Cloudy
- Game attendance: 36,902
- Referee: Scott Campbell
- TV announcers (ESPN2): Roy Philpott (play-by-play), Kelly Stouffer (analyst) & Lauren Sisler (sideline)
- ESPN – No. 14 Boise State loses Bachmeier, beats Hawaii 59–37 /// Box Score, Hawaii at Boise State /// Pregame Notes /// Postgame Notes

Game information

First Quarter

- (11:59) BSU TD – Khalil Shakir 5-yard rush, Eric Sachse kick
  Drive: 4 plays, 57 yards, 1:40; Boise State 7–0
- (08:20) BSU TD – John Hightower 26-yard pass from Hank Bachmeier, Eric Sachse kick
  Drive: 6 plays, 41 yards, 1:44; Boise State 14–0
- (07:23) HAW TD – Lincoln Victor 17-yard pass from Cole McDonald, Ryan Meskell kick
  Drive: 3 plays, 63 yards, 0:51; Boise State 14–7

Second Quarter

- (13:46) BSU FG – Eric Sachse 38-yard field goal
  Drive: 9 plays, 31 yards, 3:08; Boise State 17–7
- (05:52) BSU TD – Khalil Shakir 33-yard pass from Chase Cord, Eric Sachse kick
  Drive: 2 plays, 23 yards, 0:35; Boise State 24–7
- (02:26) BSU TD – Robert Mahone 13-yard rush, Eric Sachse kick
  Drive: 6 plays, 29 yards, 3:14; Boise State 31–7
- (00:41) HAW TD – Melquise Stovall 21-yard pass from Cole McDonald, Ryan Meskell kick
  Drive: 6 plays, 75 yards, 1:45; Boise State 31–14

Third Quarter

- (12:25) BSU TD – John Hightower 42-yard pass from Chase Cord, Eric Sachse kick
  Drive: 6 plays, 75 yards, 2:35; Boise State 38–14
- (08:24) BSU TD – George Holani 25-yard pass from Jaylon Henderson, Eric Sachse kick
  Drive: 6 plays, 66 yards, 3:12; Boise State 45–14
- (03:31) HAW TD – Cole McDonald 17-yard rush, Ryan Meskell kick
  Drive: 8 plays, 79 yards, 4:48; Boise State 45–21
- (00:00) BSU TD – George Holani 8-yard pass from Chase Cord, Eric Sachse kick
  Drive: 9 plays, 75 yards, 3:31; Boise State 52–21

Fourth Quarter

- (10:37) HAW TD – Melquise Stovall 3-yard pass from Cole McDonald, Cole McDonald rush
  Drive: 10 plays, 73 yards, 4:16; Boise State 52–29
- (02:44) HAW TD – Nick Mardner 50-yard pass from Chevan Cordeiro, Melquise Stovall rush
  Drive: 6 plays, 80 yards, 2:20; Boise State 52–37
- (01:49) BSU TD – George Holani 40-yard rush, Eric Sachse kick
  Drive: 2 plays, 43 yards, 0:53; Boise State 59–37

Passing

- HAW – Cole McDonald: 23/41, 251 yards, 3 TD
- BSU – Chase Cord: 12/18, 175 yards, 3 TD

Rushing

- HAW – Cole McDonald: 8 carries, 54 yards, 1 TD
- BSU – Robert Mahone: 16 carries, 74 yards, 1 TD

Receiving

- HAW – Melquise Stovall: 8 receptions, 114 yards, 2 TD
- BSU – John Hightower: 7 receptions, 141 yards, 2 TD

=== Air Force ===
Air Force Falcons at Hawaii Rainbow Warriors

Quarter	1	2	3	4	Total
Falcons	7	21	7	21	56
Rainbow Warriors	3	17	0	6	26

at Aloha Stadium, Honolulu, HI

- Date: October 19, 2019
- Game time: 5:00 p.m. HST
- Game weather: Temperature: 80 °F (27 °C) • Wind: ENE 10 mph • Weather: Partly Cloudy
- Game attendance: 23,757
- Referee: Steve Baron
- TV announcers (CBSSN): Rich Waltz (play-by-play) & Aaron Murray (analyst)
- ESPN – Schmidt accounts for 4 TDs, Air Force beats Hawaii 56–21 /// Box Score, Air Force at Hawaii /// Pregame Notes /// Postgame Notes

Game information

- (09:46) HAW FG – Ryan Meskell 41-yard field goal
  Drive: 10 plays, 52 yards, 5:14; Hawaii 3–0
- (06:09) AF TD – Kadin Remsberg 2-yard rush, Jake Koehnke kick
  Drive: 8 plays, 75 yards, 3:37; Air Force 7–3

Second Quarter

- (14:35) AF TD – Mike Schmidt 1-yard rush, Jake Koehnke kick
  Drive: 10 plays, 75 yards, 5:08; Air Force 14–3
- (13:44) HAW TD – Melquise Stovall 59-yard pass from Cole McDonald, Ryan Meskell kick
  Drive: 3 plays, 73 yards, 0:46; Air Force 14–10
- (13:33) AF TD – Geraud Sanders 75-yard pass from Mike Schmidt, Jake Koehnke kick
  Drive: 1 play, 75 yards, 0:11; Air Force 21–10
- (06:19) HAW FG – Ryan Meskell 27-yard field goal
  Drive: 15 plays, 67 yards, 7:14; Air Force 21–13
- (03:34) AF TD – Kadin Remsberg 7-yard rush, Jake Koehnke kick
  Drive: 5 plays, 86 yards, 2:43; Air Force 28–13
- (02:04) HAW TD – Melquise Stovall 5-yard pass from Cole McDonald, Ryan Meskell kick
  Drive: 4 plays, 71 yards, 1:30; Air Force 28–20

Third Quarter

- (07:19) AF TD – Timothy Jackson 10-yard rush, Jake Koehnke kick
  Drive: 14 plays, 75 yards, 7:41; Air Force 35–20

Fourth Quarter

- (14:54) HAW TD – JoJo Ward 10-yard pass from Cole McDonald, Cole McDonald pass failed
  Drive: 10 plays, 58 yards, 2:27; Air Force 35–26
- (13:37) AF TD – Mike Schmidt 61-yard rush, Jake Koehnke kick
  Drive: 3 plays, 75 yards, 1:17; Air Force 42–26
- (07:49) AF TD – Mike Schmidt 18-yard rush, Jake Koehnke kick
  Drive: 7 plays, 42 yards, 3:32; Air Force 49–26
- (04:01) AF TD – Milton Bugg III 92-yard interception return, Jake Koehnke kick
  Drive: 0 plays, 0 yards, 0:00; Air Force 56–26

Passing

- AF – Mike Schmidt: 5/6, 147 yards, 1 TD
- HAW – Cole McDonald: 34/52, 404 yards, 3 TD, 1 INT

Rushing

- AF – Mike Schmidt: 14 carries, 120 yards, 3 TD
- HAW – Cole McDonald: 10 carries, 41 yards

Receiving

- AF – Geraud Sanders: 3 receptions, 116 yards, 1 TD
- HAW – Jared Smart: 11 receptions, 140 yards

=== At New Mexico ===
Hawaii Rainbow Warriors at New Mexico Lobos

Quarter	1	2	3	4	Total
Rainbow Warriors	21	14	3	7	45
Lobos	3	0	7	21	31

at Dreamstyle Stadium, Albuquerque, NM

- Date: October 26, 2019
- Game time: 2:00 p.m. MDT
- Game weather: Temperature: 67 °F (19 °C) • Wind: None • Weather: Sunny
- Game attendance: 12,617
- Referee: Mike Cuttone
- TV announcers (SPEC HI / Stadium): Robert Kekaula (play-by-play) & Rich Miano (analyst)
- ESPN – McDonald, Reed help Hawaii run over New Mexico 45–31 /// Box Score, Hawaii at New Mexico /// Pregame Notes /// Postgame Notes

Game information

First Quarter

- (13:14) HAW TD – Cole McDonald 76-yard rush, Ryan Meskell kick
  Drive: 2 plays, 76 yards, 0:18; Hawaii 7–0
- (08:43) NM FG – Andrew Shelley 39-yard field goal
  Drive: 10 plays, 57 yards, 4:26; Hawaii 7–3
- (04:40) HAW TD – Solomon Matautia 14-yard interception return, Ryan Meskell kick
  Drive: 0 plays, 0 yards, 0:00; Hawaii 14–3
- (01:56) HAW TD – Kumoku Noa 54-yard pass from Cole McDonald, Ryan Meskell kick
  Drive: 4 plays, 69 yards, 1:21; Hawaii 21–3

Second Quarter

- (08:50) HAW TD – Cole McDonald 1-yard rush, Ryan Meskell kick
  Drive: 10 plays, 72 yards, 4:39; Hawaii 28–3
- (00:33) HAW TD – Miles Reed 1-yard rush, Ryan Meskell kick
  Drive: 8 plays, 77 yards, 4:12; Hawaii 35–3

Third Quarter

- (11:02) NM TD – Ahmari Davis 67-yard rush, Andrew Shelley kick
  Drive: 2 plays, 70 yards, 0:48; Hawaii 35–10
- (03:09) HAW FG – Ryan Meskell 24-yard field goal
  Drive: 7 plays, 81 yards, 2:56; Hawaii 38–10

Fourth Quarter

- (09:16) HAW TD – Lincoln Victor 9-yard pass from Chevan Cordeiro, Ryan Meskell kick
  Drive: 10 plays, 82 yards, 4:46; Hawaii 45–10
- (07:16) NM TD – Ahmari Davis 19-yard rush, Andrew Shelley kick
  Drive: 5 plays, 87 yards, 2:00; Hawaii 45–17
- (04:41) NM TD – Anu Somoye 9-yard pass from Tevaka Tuioti, Andrew Shelley kick
  Drive: 4 plays, 36 yards, 1:23; Hawaii 45–24
- (04:03) NM TD – Jordan Kress 59-yard pass from Tevaka Tuioti, Andrew Shelley kick
  Drive: 1 play, 59 yards, 0:10; Hawaii 45–31

Passing

- HAW – Cole McDonald: 17/30, 237 yards, 1 TD, 1 INT
- NM – Tevaka Tuioti: 23/40, 293 yards, 2 TD, 2 INT

Rushing

- HAW – Cole McDonald: 9 carries, 140 yards, 2 TD
- NM – Ahmari Davis: 16 carries, 200 yards, 2 TD

Receiving

- HAW – Kumoku Noa: 4 receptions, 120 yards, 1 TD
- NM – Jordan Kress: 4 receptions, 100 yards, 1 TD

=== Fresno State ===
Fresno State Bulldogs at Hawaii Rainbow Warriors

Quarter	1	2	3	4	Total
Bulldogs	7	7	17	10	41
Rainbow Warriors	0	24	0	14	38

at Aloha Stadium, Honolulu, HI

- Date: November 2, 2019
- Game time: 6:00 p.m. HST
- Game weather: Temperature: 83 °F (28 °C) • Wind: SW 8 mph • Weather: Very Humid
- Game attendance: 22,058
- Referee: Kevin Hassell
- TV announcers (SPEC HI / Stadium): Robert Kekaula (play-by-play), Rich Miano (analyst) & Scott Robbs (sideline)
- ESPN – Rivers' 2 TDs help Fresno State rally, beat Hawaii 41–38 /// Box Score, Fresno State at Hawaii /// Pregame Notes /// Postgame Notes

Game information

First Quarter

- (06:29) FS TD – Zane Pope 36-yard pass from Jalen Cropper, Cesar Silva kick
  Drive: 9 plays, 90 yards, 3:47; Fresno State 7–0

Second Quarter

- (09:23) HAW TD – Cole McDonald 6-yard rush, Ryan Meskell kick
  Drive: 9 plays, 82 yards, 4:47; Tied 7–7
- (03:35) HAW TD – Fred Holly III 1-yard rush, Ryan Meskell kick
  Drive: 11 plays, 84 yards, 4:23; Hawaii 14–7
- (02:35) HAW FG – Ryan Meskell 50-yard field goal
  Drive: 4 plays, 1 yard, 0:55; Hawaii 17–7
- (01:06) FS TD – Jalen Cropper 53-yard rush, Cesar Silva kick
  Drive: 4 plays, 75 yards, 1:29; Hawaii 17–14
- (00:23) HAW TD – JoJo Ward 48-yard pass from Cole McDonald, Ryan Meskell kick
  Drive: 4 plays, 69 yards, 0:37; Hawaii 24–14

Third Quarter

- (13:09) FS TD – Ronnie Rivers 44-yard rush, Cesar Silva kick
  Drive: 4 plays, 67 yards, 1:44; Hawaii 24–21
- (04:19) FS FG – Cesar Silva 22-yard field goal
  Drive: 12 plays, 70 yards, 5:56; Tied 24–24
- (01:07) FS TD – Ronnie Rivers 4-yard rush, Cesar Silva kick
  Drive: 6 plays, 62 yards, 2:29; Fresno State 31–24

Fourth Quarter

- (10:06) FS TD – Jared Rice 26-yard pass from Jorge Reyna, Cesar Silva kick
  Drive: 6 plays, 58 yards, 3:25; Fresno State 38–24
- (02:13) HAW TD – Miles Reed 3-yard rush, Ryan Meskell kick
  Drive: 6 plays, 63 yards, 1:32; Fresno State 38–31
- (01:08) HAW TD – Chevan Cordeiro 10-yard rush, Ryan Meskell kick
  Drive: 5 plays, 49 yards, 1:04; Tied 38–38
- (00:00) FS FG – Cesar Silva 37-yard field goal
  Drive: 9 plays, 55 yards, 1:08; Fresno State 41–38

Passing

- FS – Jorge Reyna: 17/27, 188 yards, 1 TD
- HAW – Cole McDonald: 21/42, 275 yards, 1 TD, 1 INT

Rushing

- FS – Ronnie Rivers: 19 carries, 103 yards, 2 TD
- HAW – Fred Holly III: 7 carries, 84 yards, 1 TD

Receiving

- FS – Jalen Cropper: 3 receptions, 62 yards
- HAW – Cedric Byrd II: 8 receptions, 97 yards

=== San Jose State ===
San Jose State Spartans at Hawaii Rainbow Warriors

Quarter	1	2	3	4	Total
Spartans	3	20	3	14	40
Rainbow Warriors	7	14	7	14	42

at Aloha Stadium, Honolulu, HI

- Date: November 9, 2019
- Game time: 6:00 p.m. HST
- Game weather: Temperature: 81 °F (27 °C) • Wind: ESE 5 mph • Weather: Partly Cloudy, Humidity 56%
- Game attendance: 19,858
- Referee: Eddy Shelton
- TV announcers (SPEC HI / Stadium): Robert Kekaula (play-by-play), Rich Miano (analyst) & Scott Robbs (sideline)
- ESPN – Cordeiro's 5 TDs help Hawaii beat San Jose St. 42–40 /// Box Score, San Jose State at Hawaii /// Pregame Notes /// Postgame Notes

Game information

- (09:06) SJSU FG – Matt Mercurio 28-yard field goal
  Drive: 12 plays, 64 yards, 5:54; San Jose State 3–0
- (00:27) HAW TD – JoJo Ward 5-yard pass from Chevan Cordeiro, Ryan Meskell kick
  Drive: 14 plays, 75 yards, 8:39; Hawaii 7–3

Second Quarter

- (11:15) SJSU TD – DeJon Packer 6-yard rush, Matt Mercurio kick
  Drive: 12 plays, 66 yards, 4:06; San Jose State 10–7
- (09:59) SJSU FG – Matt Mercurio 43-yard field goal
  Drive: 4 plays, −5 yards, 0:59; San Jose State 13–7
- (09:08) HAW TD – JoJo Ward 71-yard pass from Chevan Cordeiro, Ryan Meskell kick
  Drive: 2 plays, 75 yards, 0:51; Hawaii 14–13
- (06:26) SJSU TD – DeJon Packer 20-yard rush, Matt Mercurio kick
  Drive: 7 plays, 75 yards, 2:42; San Jose State 20–14
- (02:37) HAW TD – Miles Reed 4-yard rush, Ryan Meskell kick
  Drive: 8 plays, 75 yards, 3:49; Hawaii 21–20
- (00:44) SJSU FG – Matt Mercurio 43-yard field goal
  Drive: 9 plays, 49 yards, 1:53; San Jose State 23–21

Third Quarter

- (09:30) HAW TD – Chevan Cordeiro 3-yard rush, Ryan Meskell kick
  Drive: 9 plays, 87 yards, 5:23; Hawaii 28–23
- (01:21) SJSU FG – Matt Mercurio 25-yard field goal
  Drive: 16 plays, 67 yards, 8:09; Hawaii 28–26

Fourth Quarter

- (12:13) HAW TD – Jared Smart 5-yard pass from Chevan Cordeiro, Ryan Meskell kick
  Drive: 9 plays, 75 yards, 4:08; Hawaii 35–26
- (09:53) SJSU TD – Bailey Gaither 40-yard pass from Josh Love, Matt Mercurio kick
  Drive: 5 plays, 91 yards, 2:13; Hawaii 35–33
- (04:23) HAW TD – Chevan Cordeiro 2-yard rush, Ryan Meskell kick
  Drive: 12 plays, 85 yards, 5:20; Hawaii 42–33
- (01:51) SJSU TD – Isaiah Hamilton 19-yard pass from Josh Love, Matt Mercurio kick
  Drive: 10 plays, 75 yards, 2:32; Hawaii 42–40

Passing

- SJSU – Josh Love: 30/45, 375 yards, 2 TD
- HAW – Chevan Cordeiro: 23/31, 309 yards, 3 TD

Rushing

- SJSU – DeJon Packer: 20 carries, 112 yards, 2 TD
- HAW – Miles Reed: 17 carries, 124 yards, 1 TD

Receiving

- SJSU – Tre Walker: 10 receptions, 138 yards
- HAW – JoJo Ward: 7 receptions, 170 yards, 2 TD

=== At UNLV ===
Hawaii Rainbow Warriors at UNLV Rebels

Quarter	1	2	3	4	Total
Rainbow Warriors	0	7	7	7	21
Rebels	7	0	0	0	7

at Sam Boyd Stadium, Whitney, NV

- Date: November 16, 2019
- Game time: 1:00 p.m. PST
- Game weather: Temperature: 79 °F (26 °C) • Wind: N 2 mph • Weather: Clear Skies
- Game attendance: 21,317
- Referee: Cal McNeill
- TV announcers (SPEC HI / Stadium): Robert Kekaula (play-by-play) & Rich Miano (analyst)
- ESPN – McDonald, Davis propel Hawaii past UNLV 21–7 /// Box Score, Hawaii at UNLV /// Pregame Notes /// Postgame Notes

Game information

First Quarter

- (02:06) UNLV TD – Darren Woods Jr. 31-yard pass from Kenyon Oblad, Daniel Gutierrez kick
  Drive: 3 plays, 42 yards, 0:51; UNLV 7–0

Second Quarter

- (00:22) HAW TD – Cole McDonald 1-yard rush, Ryan Meskell kick
  Drive: 10 plays, 90 yards, 3:34; Tied 7–7

Third Quarter

- (01:33) HAW TD – Cortez Davis 43-yard interception return, Ryan Meskell kick
  Drive: 0 plays, 0 yards, 0:00; Hawaii 14–7

Fourth Quarter

- (11:31) HAW TD – Cole McDonald 2-yard rush, Ryan Meskell kick
  Drive: 8 plays, 58 yards, 3:31; Hawaii 21–7

Passing

- HAW – Cole McDonald: 20/26, 211 yards
- UNLV – Kenyon Oblad: 10/22, 118 yards, 1 TD, 2 INT

Rushing

- HAW – Miles Reed: 22 carries, 90 yards
- UNLV – Chad Magyar: 9 carries, 65 yards

Receiving

- HAW – Jared Smart: 9 receptions, 106 yards
- UNLV – Darren Woods Jr.: 6 receptions, 63 yards, 1 TD

=== San Diego State ===
San Diego State Aztecs at Hawaii Rainbow Warriors

Quarter	1	2	3	4	Total
Aztecs	0	3	0	8	11
Rainbow Warriors	7	0	7	0	14

at Aloha Stadium, Honolulu, HI

- Date: November 23, 2019
- Game time: 6:00 HST
- Game weather: Temperature: 78 °F (26 °C) • Wind: NE 18 mph • Weather: Mostly Cloudy
- Game attendance: 24,911
- Referee: Scott Campbell
- TV announcers (SPEC HI / Stadium): Robert Kekaula (play-by-play), Rich Miano (analyst) & Scott Robbs (sideline)
- ESPN – Hawaii beats San Diego State 14–11, wins West Division /// Box Score, San Diego State at Hawaii /// Pregame Notes /// Postgame Notes

Game information

First Quarter

- (03:43) HAW TD – Jason-Matthew Sharsh 8-yard pass from Cole McDonald, Ryan Meskell kick
  Drive: 15 plays, 92 yards, 8:30; Hawaii 7–0

Second Quarter

- (00:18) SDSU FG – Matt Araiza 27-yard field goal
  Drive: 8 plays, 41 yards, 1:11; Hawaii 7–3

Third Quarter

- (05:15) HAW TD – Fred Holly III 11-yard rush, Ryan Meskell kick
  Drive: 14 plays, 96 yards, 7:12; Hawaii 14–3

Fourth Quarter

- (12:58) SDSU TD – Ryan Agnew 5-yard rush, Ryan Agnew rush
  Drive: 16 plays, 75 yards, 7:17; Hawaii 14–11

Passing

- SDSU – Ryan Agnew: 25/39, 229 yards
- HAW – Cole McDonald: 13/19, 144 yards, 1 TD, 1 INT

Rushing

- SDSU – Chase Jasmin: 7 carries, 37 yards
- HAW – Chevan Cordeiro: 8 carries, 59 yards

Receiving

- SDSU – Kobe Smith: 6 receptions, 74 yards
- HAW – Jason-Matthew Sharsh: 10 receptions, 95 yards, 1 TD

=== Army ===
Army Black Knights at Hawaii Rainbow Warriors

Quarter	1	2	3	4	Total
Black Knights	10	7	14	0	31
Rainbow Warriors	10	14	14	14	52

at Aloha Stadium, Honolulu, HI

- Date: November 30, 2019
- Game time: 7:30 p.m. HST
- Game weather: Temperature: 78 °F (26 °C) • Wind: ENE 15 mph • Weather: Cloudy, Nice Sunset
- Game attendance: 26,256
- Referee: David Alvarez
- TV announcers (CBSSN): Ben Holden (play-by-play) & Ross Tucker (analyst)
- ESPN – McDonald's 3 TD passes help Hawaii beat Army 52–31 /// Box Score, Army at Hawaii /// Pregame Notes /// Postgame Notes

Game information

First Quarter

- (13:16) ARMY TD – Sandon McCoy 3-yard rush, David Cooper kick
  Drive: 4 plays, 75 yards, 1:44; Army 7–0
- (09:45) HAW FG – Ryan Meskell 42-yard field goal
  Drive: 8 plays, 51 yards, 3:31; Army 7–3
- (03:31) ARMY FG – David Cooper 32-yard field goal
  Drive: 11 plays, 60 yards, 6:14; Army 10–3
- (02:33) HAW TD – Jason-Matthew Sharsh 26-yard pass from Chevan Cordiero, Ryan Meskell kick
  Drive: 2 plays, 56 yards, 0:50; Tied 10–10

Second Quarter

- (13:40) ARMY TD – Sandon McCoy 7-yard rush, David Cooper kick
  Drive: 8 plays, 75 yards, 3:53; Army 17–10
- (08:08) HAW TD – Cedric Byrd II 25-yard pass from Chevan Cordiero, Ryan Meskell kick
  Drive: 1 play, 25 yards, 0:06; Tied 17–17
- (02:40) HAW TD – Jason-Matthew Sharsh 4-yard pass from Cole McDonald, Ryan Meskell kick
  Drive: 7 plays, 33 yards, 3:09; Hawaii 24–17

Third Quarter

- (12:31) HAW TD – Miles Reed 1-yard rush, Ryan Meskell kick
  Drive: 6 plays, 76 yards, 2:25; Hawaii 31–17
- (10:49) ARMY TD – Connor Slomka 30-yard rush, David Cooper kick
  Drive: 4 plays, 75 yards, 1:42; Hawaii 31–24
- (05:30) HAW TD – JoJo Ward 7-yard pass from Cole McDonald, Ryan Meskell kick
  Drive: 11 plays, 73 yards, 5:19; Hawaii 38–24
- (01:26) ARMY TD – Malik Hancock 10-yard rush, David Cooper kick
  Drive: 8 plays, 75 yards, 4:04; Hawaii 38–31

Fourth Quarter

- (03:51) HAW TD – Jared Smart 20-yard pass from Cole McDonald, Ryan Meskell kick
  Drive: 6 plays, 70 yards, 2:43; Hawaii 45–31
- (01:34) HAW TD – Rojesterman Farris II 100-yard interception return, Ryan Meskell kick
  Drive: 0 plays, 0 yards, 0:00; Hawaii 52–31

Passing

- ARMY – Kelvin Hopkins Jr.: 1/3, 69 yards, 1 INT
- HAW – Cole McDonald: 19/29, 250 yards, 3 TD

Rushing

- ARMY – Christian Anderson: 12 carries, 114 yards
- HAW – Miles Reed: 10 carries, 92 yards, 1 TD

Receiving

- ARMY – Artice Hobbs IV: 1 reception, 69 yards
- HAW – Jared Smart: 8 receptions, 123 yards, 1 TD

=== At Boise State – Mountain West Championship Game ===
Mountain West Championship Game: Hawaii Rainbow Warriors at No. 19 Boise State Broncos

Quarter	1	2	3	4	Total
Rainbow Warriors	3	0	0	7	10
No. 19 Broncos	3	14	14	0	31

at Albertsons Stadium, Boise, ID

- Date: December 7, 2019
- Game time: 2:00 p.m. MST
- Game weather: Temperature: 48 °F (9 °C) • Wind: SE 10 mph • Weather: Mostly Cloudy
- Game attendance: 23,561
- Referee: Cooper Castleberry
- TV announcers (ESPN): Roy Philpott (play-by-play), Kelly Stouffer (analyst) & Lauren Sisler (sideline)
- ESPN – Boise State tops Hawaii for Mountain West title /// Box Score, Hawaii at No. 19 Boise State, 2019 Mountain West Championship /// Pregame Notes /// Postgame Notes

Game information

First Quarter

- (06:44) HAW FG – Ryan Meskell 47-yard field goal
  Drive: 11 plays, 35 yards, 6:52; Hawaii 3–0
- (00:30) BSU FG – Eric Sachse 34-yard field goal
  Drive: 15 plays, 58 yards, 6:14; Tied 3–3

Second Quarter

- (01:07) BSU TD – Khalil Shakir 36-yard pass from Jaylon Henderson, Eric Sachse kick
  Drive: 8 plays, 80 yards, 2:37; Boise State 10–3
- (00:14) BSU TD – John Hightower 36-yard pass from Jaylon Henderson, Eric Sachse kick
  Drive: 2 plays, 57 yards, 0:24; Boise State 17–3

Third Quarter

- (01:09) BSU TD – Khalil Shakir 4-yard rush, Eric Sachse kick
  Drive: 11 plays, 79 yards, 5:54; Boise State 24–3
- (00:18) BSU TD – Jaylon Henderson 5-yard rush, Eric Sachse kick
  Drive: 2 plays, 9 yards, 0:41; Boise State 31–3

Fourth Quarter

- (12:00) HAW TD – Miles Reed 21-yard rush, Ryan Meskell kick
  Drive: 8 plays, 75 yards, 3:18; Boise State 31–10

Passing

- HAW – Cole McDonald: 20/36, 241 yards, 1 INT
- BSU – Jaylon Henderson: 20/29, 212 yards, 2 TD, 1 INT

Rushing

- HAW – Miles Reed: 12 carries, 87 yards, 1 TD
- BSU – George Holani: 16 carries, 67 yards

Receiving

- HAW – Jason-Matthew Sharsh: 7 receptions, 74 yards
- BSU – Khalil Shakir: 7 receptions, 89 yards, 1 TD

=== BYU – Hawaii Bowl ===
SoFi Hawaii Bowl: BYU Cougars vs. Hawaii Rainbow Warriors

Quarter	1	2	3	4	Total
Rainbow Warriors	14	17	0	7	38
Cougars	7	17	7	3	34

at Aloha Stadium, Honolulu, HI

- Date: December 24, 2019
- Game time: 3:00 p.m. HST
- Game weather: Temperature: 83 °F (28 °C) • Wind: S 11 mph • Weather: Partly Cloudy, 59% Humidity
- Game attendance: 21,582
- Referee: Tim O'Dey
- TV announcers (ESPN): Jason Benetti (play-by-play), Rod Gilmore (analyst) & Quint Kessenich (sideline)
- ESPN – McDonald throws for 493, leads Hawaii past BYU /// Box Score, Hawaii vs. BYU, 2019 SoFi Hawaii Bowl /// Pregame Notes /// Postgame Notes

Game information

First Quarter

- (07:32) HAW TD – Jared Smart 7-yard pass from Cole McDonald, Ryan Meskell kick
  Drive: 10 plays, 82 yards, 5:09; Hawaii 7–0
- (04:55) HAW TD – Jared Smart 40-yard pass from Cole McDonald, Ryan Meskell kick
  Drive: 2 plays, 40 yards, 0:51; Hawaii 14–0
- (00:54) BYU TD – Lopini Katoa 1-yard rush, Jake Oldroyd kick
  Drive: 10 plays, 73 yards, 3:57; Hawaii 14–7

Second Quarter

- (13:33) HAW TD – Cole McDonald 1-yard rush, Ryan Meskell kick
  Drive: 6 plays, 78 yards, 2:17; Hawaii 21–7
- (09:42) BYU TD – Zach Wilson 1-yard rush, Jake Oldroyd kick
  Drive: 8 plays, 75 yards, 3:51; Hawaii 21–14
- (05:50) HAW FG – Ryan Meskell 46-yard field goal
  Drive: 9 plays, 49 yards, 3:46; Hawaii 24–14
- (03:16) BYU TD – Micah Simon 11-yard rush, Jake Oldroyd kick
  Drive: 7 plays, 75 yards, 2:34; Hawaii 24–21
- (01:16) HAW TD – Jason-Matthew Sharsh 18-yard pass from Cole McDonald, Ryan Meskell kick
  Drive: 9 plays, 71 yards, 1:55; Hawaii 31–21
- (00:18) BYU FG – Jake Oldroyd 37-yard field goal
  Drive: 8 plays, 50 yards, 0:58; Hawaii 31–24

Third Quarter

- (11:58) BYU TD – Zach Wilson 2-yard rush, Jake Oldroyd kick
  Drive: 2 plays, 6 yards, 0:39; Tied 31–31

Fourth Quarter

- (14:37) BYU FG – Jake Oldroyd 20-yard field goal
  Drive: 8 plays, 54 yards, 3:09; BYU 34–31
- (01:17) HAW TD – Nick Mardner 24-yard pass from Cole McDonald, Ryan Meskell kick
  Drive: 4 plays, 71 yards, 0:44; Hawaii 38–34

Statistics	HAW	BYU
First downs	19	29
Plays–yards	74–495	81–505
Rushes–yards	27–2	40–231
Passing yards	493	274
Passing: comp–att–int	28–47–0	24–41–2
Turnovers		
Time of possession	29:29	30:31

Team	Category	Player	Statistics
Hawaii	Passing	Cole McDonald	28/46, 493 yards, 4 TD
Hawaii	Rushing	Miles Reed	10 carries, 17 yards
Hawaii	Receiving	JoJo Ward	7 receptions, 159 yards
BYU	Passing	Zach Wilson	24/40, 274 yards, 2 INT
BYU	Rushing	Tyler Allgeier	8 carries, 77 yards
BYU	Receiving	Matt Bushman	6 receptions, 91 yards

Source for Match-up Records:

== Players drafted into the NFL ==
Round	Pick	Player	Position	NFL club
7	224	Cole McDonald	QB	Tennessee Titans
