= Joel Matlin =

Canadian entrepreneur

- Born: Montreal, CA
- Education: Concordia University
- Occupation: CEO/Radio Host/Entrepreneur
- Title: President & CEO of Think Protection, Inc. (2015–2019) Co-founder of Matlin Creative (2013–2015) Founder of AlarmForce Industries, Inc. (1988–2013) Founder of Frisco Bay Industries Ltd. (1970–1988) Co-founder of Camtron Electronic Co-founder of Alarmtron

Joel Matlin is a Canadian entrepreneur best known for being the President and founder of North American home alarm company AlarmForce, a home alarm company that Matlin led for 25 years.

== History ==
Joel Matlin was born and raised in Montreal. He attended Concordia University studying business. He has returned to Concordia as a guest lecturer at the John Molson School of Business. Matlin has also appeared as a guest speaker at the Ted Rogers School of Management and Trent University.

In 1969 Matlin founded Frisco Bay Industries and was president until 1988. Frisco Bay was a leading supplier of integrated security systems and bank automation to major corporations including the Canadian Banks, Bell Canada, and the Canadian Mint and other prominent companies. During Matlin's leadership he co-founded a home alarm company, Alarmtron with two partners in 1979 until its sale in 1981. Matlin vowed that he would return to the home alarm market once the technology was perfected. In 1988 Matlin planned to re-enter the home alarm business under the Frisco Bay banner, which resulted in a dispute with his business partner. In November 1988 Matlin triggered the shotgun clause of his partnership agreement which resulted in Matlin selling his shares and exiting Frisco Bay Industries. Subsequent to Matlin's departure Frisco Bay was purchased by Stanley Black & Decker for $45 million.

After Matlin had sold his interest in Frisco Bay Industries, he founded AlarmForce Industries in 1988. As President and CEO and over a 25-year period, Matlin guided AlarmForce to becoming the third largest home alarm company in Canada, and one of the top 20 in the USA. Matlin was instrumental in bringing AlarmForce public, initially on the Canadian Dealer Network and then having it listed in 1997 on the Toronto Stock Exchange. Matlin directed the company from inception, achieving a market capitalization of $135 million on his departure.

In July 2013 Matlin was fired by the AlarmForce board of directors. Matlin sued the company for $11.3 million, which was settled in February 2016.

Following Matlin's departure from AlarmForce after 25 years during his one-year non-compete clause, Matlin and his son Adam started Matlin Creative, a marketing and consultancy business.

In June 2015 Matlin co-founded Think Protection with his son Adam. Think Protection is a DIY mass-market home alarm company targeting consumers in both Canada and the US. Under the Matlins' leadership, Think Protection successfully penetrated the DIY alarm market and established thousands of monitored accounts throughout Canada and the United States.

As of November 2019, Matlin divested his investment in Think Protection and is no longer affiliated with the company.

On September 13 2020, Matlin started hosting national weekly radio show "The Joel Matlin Entrepreneur Show". The show is broadcast on the Global/Corus radio network every Sunday at 5:00 p.m. EST in Toronto on AM 640, as well as on other local stations in Hamilton, London, Winnipeg, Calgary, Edmonton and Vancouver.
