= Cole McDonald =

American gridiron football player (born 1998)

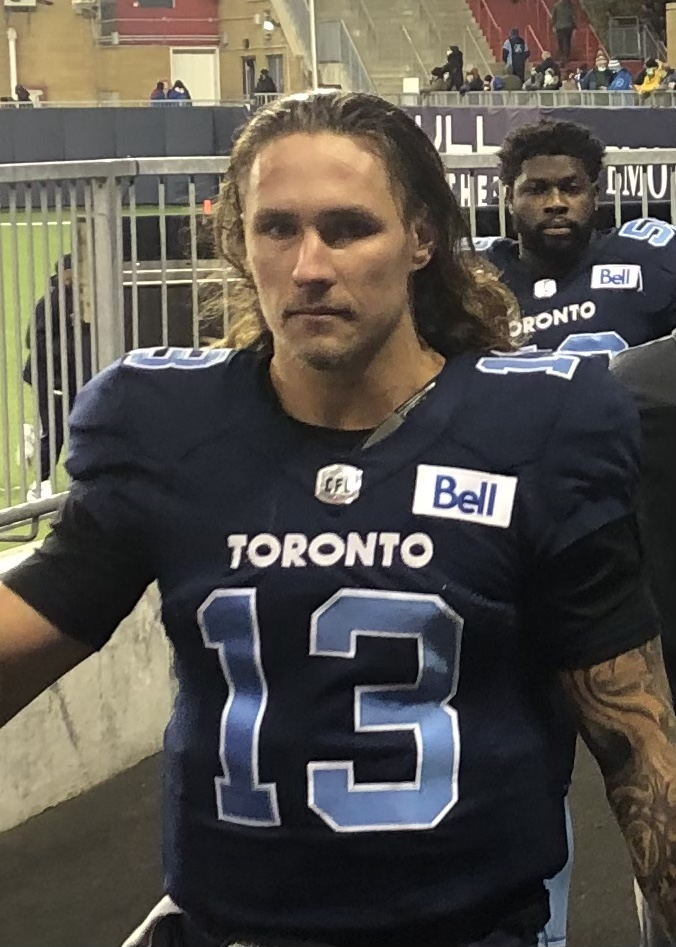
- McDonald with the Toronto Argonauts in 2021

No. 13
- Position: Quarterback

Personal information
- Born: May 20, 1998 (age 28); La Mirada, California, U.S.
- Listed height: 6 ft 4 in (1.93 m)
- Listed weight: 220 lb (100 kg)

Career information
- High school: Sonora (La Habra, California)
- College: Hawaii (2016–2019)
- NFL draft: 2020: 7th round, 224th overall pick

Career history
- Tennessee Titans (2020)*; Arizona Cardinals (2021)*; Toronto Argonauts (2021); Houston Roughnecks (2023); Edmonton Elks (2024)*
- * Offseason or practice squad member only

Awards and highlights
- Second-team All-MWC (2019)

Career CFL statistics
- TD–INT: 0–1
- Passing yards: 45
- Completion percentage: 50.0
- Stats at CFL.ca

Cole McDonald (born May 20, 1998) is an American former professional football quarterback. He played college football for the Hawaii Rainbow Warriors and was selected by the Tennessee Titans in the seventh round of the 2020 NFL draft.

== Early life ==
McDonald was born in La Mirada, California, and grew up in La Habra, California. He attended Sonora High School where he played football and ran track. As a senior, McDonald completed 63% of his passes for 2,313 yards and 19 touchdowns while also rushing for 1,091 yards and 10 touchdowns. McDonald was lightly recruited in high school and initially received no scholarship offers from Division I schools. He initially intended on playing at a junior college for a year until he received a last-minute offer from Hawaii coach Nick Rolovich the night before national signing day.

== College career ==
McDonald redshirted his true freshman season. As a redshirt freshman, McDonald served as the Rainbow Warriors's backup quarterback and played in six games, completing five of nine passes for 22 yards and a touchdown and finishing third on the team in rushing with 138 and one touchdown on 16 carries.

=== 2018 season ===
He was named the team's starting quarterback going into his redshirt sophomore season and passed for 3,875 yards and 36 touchdowns and was named honorable mention All-Mountain West Conference (MWC). He tightened his motion after consulting quarterbacks coach Craig Stutzmann and completed 38 percent of his deep throws. Following the end of the season McDonald revealed that he had played through a sprained MCL and internal bleeding.

=== 2019 season ===
As a redshirt junior, McDonald passed for 4,135 and 33 touchdowns with 14 interceptions while also rushing for 383 yards and seven touchdowns and was named second-team All-MWC. McDonald threw for 4 touchdowns but also 4 interceptions in the Rainbow Warriors' first game of the season against Arizona, stopping Arizona quarterback Khalil Tate at the 1-yard line for the 45-38 win. In their next game against Oregon State, Hawaii came back from a 21-7 deficit in the second quarter to win 31-28. He had a strong performance in a 54-3 road thrashing against Nevada, completing 25 of his 30 passes and throwing for 312 yards and 4 touchdowns. Following the end of the season, he announced that he would forgo his final year of NCAA eligibility to enter the 2020 NFL draft.

=== Statistics ===
Year	Team	GP	Passing							Rushing			
Year	Team	GP	Cmp	Att	Pct	Yds	TD	Int	Rtg	Att	Yds	Avg	TD
2016	Hawaii	0	Redshirt										
2017	Hawaii	6	5	9	55.6	22	1	0	112.8	16	138	8.6	1
2018	Hawaii	13	285	484	58.9	3,875	36	10	146.5	134	359	2.7	4
2019	Hawaii	14	326	511	63.8	4,135	33	14	147.6	101	383	3.2	7
Career		33	616	1,004	61.4	8,032	70	24	146.8	251	880	3.5	12

== Professional career ==
=== Pre-draft ===
Pre-draft measurables
Height	Weight	Arm length	Hand span	Wingspan	40-yard dash	10-yard split	20-yard split	20-yard shuttle	Three-cone drill	Vertical jump	Broad jump
6 ft 3 1/8 in (1.91 m)	215 lb (98 kg)	32 1/4 in (0.82 m)	9 3/4 in (0.25 m)	6 ft 4 3/4 in (1.95 m)	4.58 s	1.55 s	2.70 s	4.52 s	7.13 s	36.0 in (0.91 m)	10 ft 1 in (3.07 m)
All values from NFL Combine

McDonald received an invitation to the NFL Scouting Combine and recorded the fastest 40-yard dash among quarterbacks with a time of 4.58 seconds and the highest vertical jump at 36 inches.

=== Tennessee Titans ===
McDonald was selected by the Tennessee Titans in the seventh round with the 224th overall pick of the 2020 NFL draft. He was waived by the Titans on August 19, 2020.

McDonald had a tryout with the Carolina Panthers on August 23, 2020.

=== Arizona Cardinals ===
McDonald was signed to a futures contract with the Arizona Cardinals on February 4, 2021. He was waived by the Cardinals on May 27.

=== Toronto Argonauts ===
On September 13, 2021, McDonald signed with the Toronto Argonauts and was placed on the team's practice roster. He dressed as a backup for the last regular season game with the Argonauts resting starters for the playoffs. He completed four out of eight pass attempts for 45 yards and one interception. He was released on May 25, 2022, in the early stages of 2022 training camp.

=== Houston Roughnecks ===
On November 15, 2022, McDonald was assigned to the Houston Roughnecks of the XFL. He was released on December 15, 2023.

=== Edmonton Elks ===
On May 28, 2024, McDonald signed with the Edmonton Elks of the Canadian Football League. He was released by Edmonton on June 2.
