= David Matlin =

American sports administrator

David A. K. Matlin
Biographical details
- Born: November 16, 1964 (age 61); Honolulu, Hawaii, U.S.
- Education: University of Michigan

Administrative career (AD unless noted)
- 1987–1993: Houston Astros (Director of Sales/Marketing Operations)
- 1994–1999: Hawaii (Administrative Officer)
- 2002–2008: Hawaii Bowl (Director of Operations)
- 2008–2015: Hawaii Bowl (Executive Director)
- 2015–2023: Hawaii

David Alexander Kalakaua Matlin (born November 16, 1964) is an American former college sports administrator. Matlin was the director of athletics for the University of Hawaii at Manoa from 2015 until his retirement in 2023. Prior to his appointment as athletic director at Hawaii, he previously served as Executive Director of the Hawaii Bowl from 2008 to 2015. Matlin is the son of Lew Matlin, former general manager of the Hawaii Islanders baseball team. Matlin graduated from the University of Michigan with a bachelor's degree in 1987. Matlin was named athletic director at the University of Hawaii at Manoa on March 25, 2015.
