= Hawaii Rainbow Warriors football =

University of Hawaii football team

2026 Hawaii Rainbow Warriors football team
- First season: 1909; 117 years ago
- Athletic director: Matt Elliott
- Head coach: Timmy Chang; 4th season, 22–30 (.423)
- Location: Honolulu, Hawaii
- Stadium: Clarence T. C. Ching Athletics Complex (capacity: 15,194)
- NCAA division: Division I FBS
- Conference: Mountain West
- Colors: Green, black, silver, and white
- All-time record: 597–504–25 (.541)
- Bowl record: 9–6 (.600)

Conference championships
- WAC: 1992, 1999, 2007, 2010

Division championships
- MW West: 2019
- Rivalries: Fresno State (rivalry); Air Force (rivalry); Wyoming (rivalry); San Jose State (rivalry); UNLV (rivalry)
- Fight song: University of Hawaii Fight Song Co-Ed
- Mascot: Vili the Warrior (1999–2011)
- Marching band: Rainbow Warriors Marching Band
- Outfitter: Nike

The Hawaii Rainbow Warriors football team represents the University of Hawaiʻi at Mānoa in NCAA Division I FBS college football. It was part of the Western Athletic Conference until July 2012, when the team joined the Mountain West Conference (MW) as a football-only member, with an upgrade to full MW membership in 2026. From 2000 until 2013, the team was known simply as the Warriors.

== History ==
=== Early history ===
- 1909 – The College of Hawaii "Fighting Deans" played and won its game against McKinley High School by a score of 95–5 at Punahou School.
- 1920 – The College of Hawaii becomes the University of Hawaiʻi and the football team plays its first intercollegiate game against Nevada, losing 14–0 on Christmas Day.

=== Otto Klum era (1921–1939) ===
- 1922 – Hawaiʻi defeats its first collegiate opponent, beating Pomona 25–6 on Christmas Day.
- 1923 – A rainbow appears over Moiliili Field after Hawaiʻi upsets Oregon State, 7–0. Local reporters begin calling UH athletic teams the "Rainbows."
- 1924–25 – The Rainbows, under the guidance of coach Otto Klum, complete back-to-back undefeated seasons. The Rainbows outscore their opponents 606–29 in 18 games. Among the schools defeated during this time are Colorado, Colorado State and Washington State. These Rainbow teams become known as the "Wonder Teams" due to their outstanding play.
- 1926 – The Rainbows play their first game at their newly constructed home field, Honolulu Stadium. The Rainbows fall to the Town Team by a score of 14–7 in front of 12,000 fans on Armistice Day.
- 1935 – Rainbow running back and future coach Tom Kaulukukui becomes Hawaiʻi's first All-American player. Kaulukukui starred on Hawaiʻi's 1934 undefeated team and set a school record in 1935 with a 103-yard kick return touchdown during a 19–6 loss to UCLA in Los Angeles. Kaulukukui's number 32 is later retired by the University and remained the only number to be retired in Hawaiʻi in football history until Colt Brennan's No. 15 was retired in 2021.

=== Eugene Gill era (1940–1941) ===
- 1942 – Following the Attack on Pearl Harbor and the United States' entry into World War II, Hawaiʻi cancels the 1942, 1943, 1944, and 1945 football seasons.

=== Tom Kaulukukui era (1946–1950) ===
- 1946 – Hawaiʻi resumes football play after a four-year hiatus as a member of the NCAA. Hawaiʻi enters as a College Division Independent. The Rainbows continue to play local teams on occasion but the bulk of their schedules are made up of collegiate teams.

=== Hank Vasconcellos era (1952–1960) ===
- 1955 – A year after suffering a 50–0 blowout loss to Nebraska in Honolulu, the Rainbows go up to Lincoln the following season and upset the Huskers 6–0. The win is considered one of the school's all-time biggest upsets.
- 1961 – The UH Board of Athletic Control votes to abolish the football program due to a lack of finances. The program would return to intercollegiate competition the following year behind the urgings of new athletics director Young Suk Ko.

=== Shaughnessy-Sarboe-King era (1965–1967) ===
- 1965 – Larry Price performed in his third Hula Bowl as a College All-Star after a stint in the U.S. Army where he performed twice for the Hawai'i All-Stars. Legendary coach Clark Shaughnessy takes over for one season but the Rainbows flounder through a 1–8–1 season.
- 1966 – Phil Sarboe, after 15 seasons as head coach at Humboldt State, guides the team to a 4–6 record playing its first all-collegiate schedule. He resigns for "personal reasons" after the season.
- 1967 – Don King, an assistant under Sarboe, becomes head coach and the much-improved Rainbows post a 6–4 record. Significantly, large crowds (18,000 to 20,000) flock to Honolulu Stadium to watch the Rainbows for the first time in many years, setting the stage for a major gridiron revival in future years.

=== Dave Holmes era (1968–1973) ===
- 1968 – Head coach Dave Holmes begins what would be the most successful coaching tenure at Hawaiʻi. From 1968–1974, UH won 67 percent of its games and never suffered a losing season. Holmes still ranks as the all-time leader at Hawaiʻi in winning percentage (.718). Drafted by the Dallas Cowboys in the 16th round, Larry Cole becomes the first UH Warrior to be drafted by an NFL team. Cole was a one-year transfer from the United States Air Force Academy and later graduated from the University of Houston.
- 1971 – Larry Cole becomes the first former Warrior to represent UH in world championship competition in Super Bowl V for the Dallas Cowboys.
- 1972 – Larry Cole becomes the first former Warrior to start for a world champion football team with the Dallas Cowboys in Super Bowl VI.
- 1973 – The Rainbows record what is widely considered to be the biggest upset in school history, defeating Washington 10–7 in front of 52,500 in Seattle. The Huskies were favored to beat Hawaiʻi by as many as 50 points.

=== Larry Price era (1974–1976) ===
- 1974 – Hawaiʻi becomes an NCAA Division I member. The team's new nickname becomes the "Bow's." They play their final year at Honolulu Stadium. Larry Price becomes Hawaiʻi's first Division I head football coach.
- 1975 – 50,000-seat Aloha Stadium becomes the new home of Hawaiʻi football. Hawaiʻi loses its first game in the new stadium, falling to Texas A&I by a score of 43–9 in front of a crowd of 32,247.
- 1976 – The NCAA reclassifies its divisions and drops Hawaiʻi to Division I-AA (now FCS). Athletic Director Ray Nagel appeals the decision and the next month the NCAA reinstitutes Hawaiʻi to Division I-A (now FBS) status.

=== Dick Tomey era (1977–1986) ===
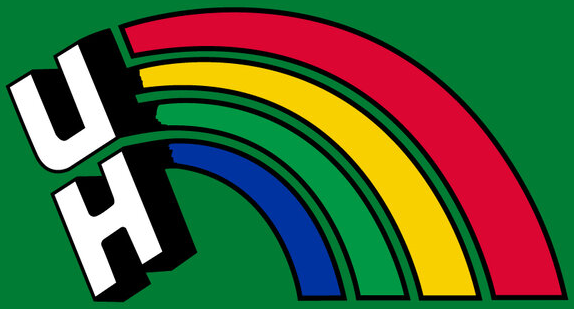
Former logo of the Rainbow Warriors (1982–2000)

- 1979 – Hawaiʻi becomes a member of the Western Athletic Conference.
- 1982 – Dan Audick becomes the first Warrior to have graduated from the university and to have started for a Super Bowl champion. Audick played for the San Francisco 49ers in Super Bowl XVI.
- 1986 – Defensive end Al Noga becomes the first Hawaiʻi player to be named a first-team All-American by the Associated Press. He also was tabbed as the school's first Heisman Trophy candidate. DeWayne Jett becomes the first Warrior to have graduated from the university and to have started for a Grey Cup champion. Jett played for the Canadian Football League Hamilton Tiger-Cats in their victory over the Edmonton Eskimos.

=== Bob Wagner era (1987–1995) ===
- 1989 – Hawaiʻi plays in the program's first major bowl game — the Jeep Eagle Aloha Bowl. Hawaiʻi falls to Michigan State, 33–13, before a sellout crowd at Aloha Stadium.
- 1990 – The Rainbows rout BYU, 59–28, on December 1. Earlier that day, BYU quarterback Ty Detmer won the Heisman Trophy.
- 1992 – Hawaiʻi wins a share of its first-ever WAC championship which qualifies it for the Thrifty Car Rental Holiday Bowl. In the game, the Rainbow Warriors earn their first bowl victory, a 27–17 defeat of Illinois. Hawaiʻi would finish the season ranked 20th in the nation and post a team-record 11 victories. The 1992 Rainbows had 10 regular season victories and two future NFL veterans: defensive end Maa Tanuvasa, who played seven seasons; and place kicker Jason Elam, who played 17 seasons and was selected to three Pro Bowls.

=== Fred von Appen era (1996–1998) ===
- 1996 – Rich Ellerson extends coaching tree for former UH Warriors by being named as Head Football Coach for Southern Utah. In his single season, Ellerson accrued a 4–7 record.
- 1998 – Hawaiʻi suffers through the program's first-ever winless season, going 0–12 under head coach Fred von Appen. Von Appen coached the Rainbow Warriors. to a 5–31 record in his three years at Hawaiʻi. He would be fired after the season.

=== June Jones era (1999–2007) ===
- 1999 – June Jones becomes the new head coach at Hawaiʻi and guides the Rainbow Warriors to the best single-season turnaround in NCAA history, winning nine games and a share of the WAC championship. Hawaiʻi would go on to defeat Oregon State in the Jeep Oʻahu Bowl, 23–17.
- 2001 – Hawaiʻi changes its nickname from "Rainbow Warriors" to simply "Warriors." Wide receiver Ashley Lelie becomes the highest draft pick in program history as the Denver Broncos select him with the 19th pick in the first round of the 2002 NFL draft. Rich Ellerson extends coaching tree for former UH Warriors by being named as head coach for Cal Poly. During his eight-year tenure, Ellerson led Cal Poly to a 52–38 record.
- 2002 – Hawaiʻi is invited to play in the inaugural ConAgra Foods Hawaiʻi Bowl. The Warriors would fall to Tulane, 36–28.
- 2003 – Hawaiʻi returns to the Hawaiʻi Bowl and defeats Houston in a wild 54–48 triple-overtime game. Most notable win of the season came against Alabama in Honolulu by the score of 37–29.
- 2004 – Hawaiʻi returns for a third-straight season to the Hawaii Bowl and triumphs over UAB, 59–40. Hawaiʻi quarterback Timmy Chang would also become the NCAA's all-time leader in passing yards with 17,072 over the course of his career, eclipsing the old mark (15,031) set by former BYU quarterback Ty Detmer.

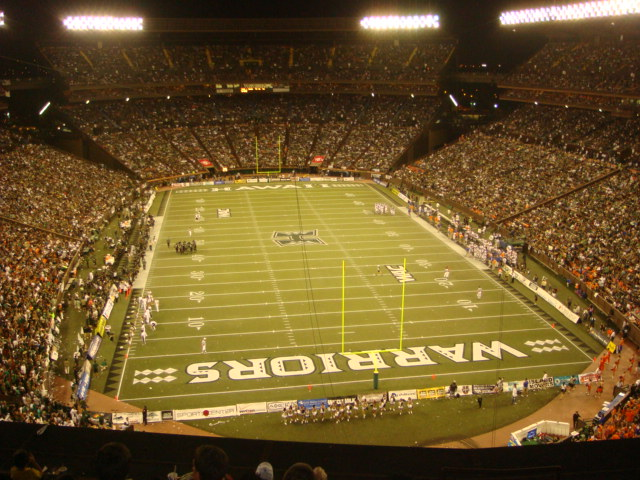
Game between Boise State and Hawaiʻi in 2007. Hawaiʻi won 39–27.

- 2005 – Hawaiʻi finishes 5–7 and misses out on playing in a bowl game for the first time since 2001, despite a breakout year for quarterback Colt Brennan.
- 2006 – Quarterback Colt Brennan sets NCAA single-season records for touchdown passes (58) and passer efficiency rating (185.78), on his way to a sixth-place finish in the Heisman Trophy voting. The Warriors return to the Hawaiʻi Bowl and defeat Arizona State, 41–24. Hawaiʻi head coach June Jones passes Dick Tomey to become the winningest head coach in school history.
- 2007 – Brennan adds to his collection of NCAA records, breaking Detmer's career records for TD passes and total TDs passing, rushing and receiving. He and wide receiver Davone Bess also tied an NCAA record for most career TDs by a quarterback-receiver combination. The Warriors are unbeaten, with a breakthrough win against Boise State, giving the Warriors their first win ever over the Broncos as a WAC member and their first outright WAC title ever. A 35–28 win over Washington in the season finale on December 1 resulted in them finishing No. 12 in the BCS rankings and earning a berth in the Sugar Bowl. This is the first regular season Hawaiʻi has ever gone undefeated. Hawaiʻi was also the sole undefeated college football team for the season. Hawaiʻi then played Georgia on January 1, 2008 in New Orleans, losing 41–10. Ken Niumatalolo extends coaching tree for former UH Warriors by being named as Head Football Coach for Navy. Quarterback Colt Brennan was selected for the second year in a row as a Heisman Finalist, this time finishing in third place behind Tim Tebow and Darren McFadden.

=== Greg McMackin era (2008–2011) ===
- 2008 – Head coach June Jones resigns shortly after the 2007 season, ending his nine-year coaching run to become the new head coach at Southern Methodist University. On January 15, Greg McMackin, formerly the defensive coordinator under June Jones, accepted the position of head coach. Rich Ellerson extends coaching tree for former UH Warriors by being named as head coach for Army.
- 2009 – Jim Mills becomes the first UH Warrior to be inducted into the Canadian Football Hall of Fame for his play as an offensive tackle in the Canadian Football League.
- 2010 – Hawaiʻi wins its 4th WAC Championship by becoming co-champions with Nevada and Boise State. University of Hawaiʻi received and accepted an invitation to join the Mountain West Conference for football only and Big West Conference for all other sports. The Warriors bolted from Western Athletic Conference to join the Mountain West Conference along with rivals; Boise State, Fresno State and Nevada. Boise State started playing in the MWC starting in 2011, while Hawaiʻi along with Fresno State and Nevada made their MWC debuts in 2012.
- 2011 – Coach Greg McMackin resigns as head coach citing "being forced out under pressure" from the past season's record. Utah offensive coordinator Norm Chow was chosen to succeed McMackin.

=== Norm Chow era (2012–2015) ===
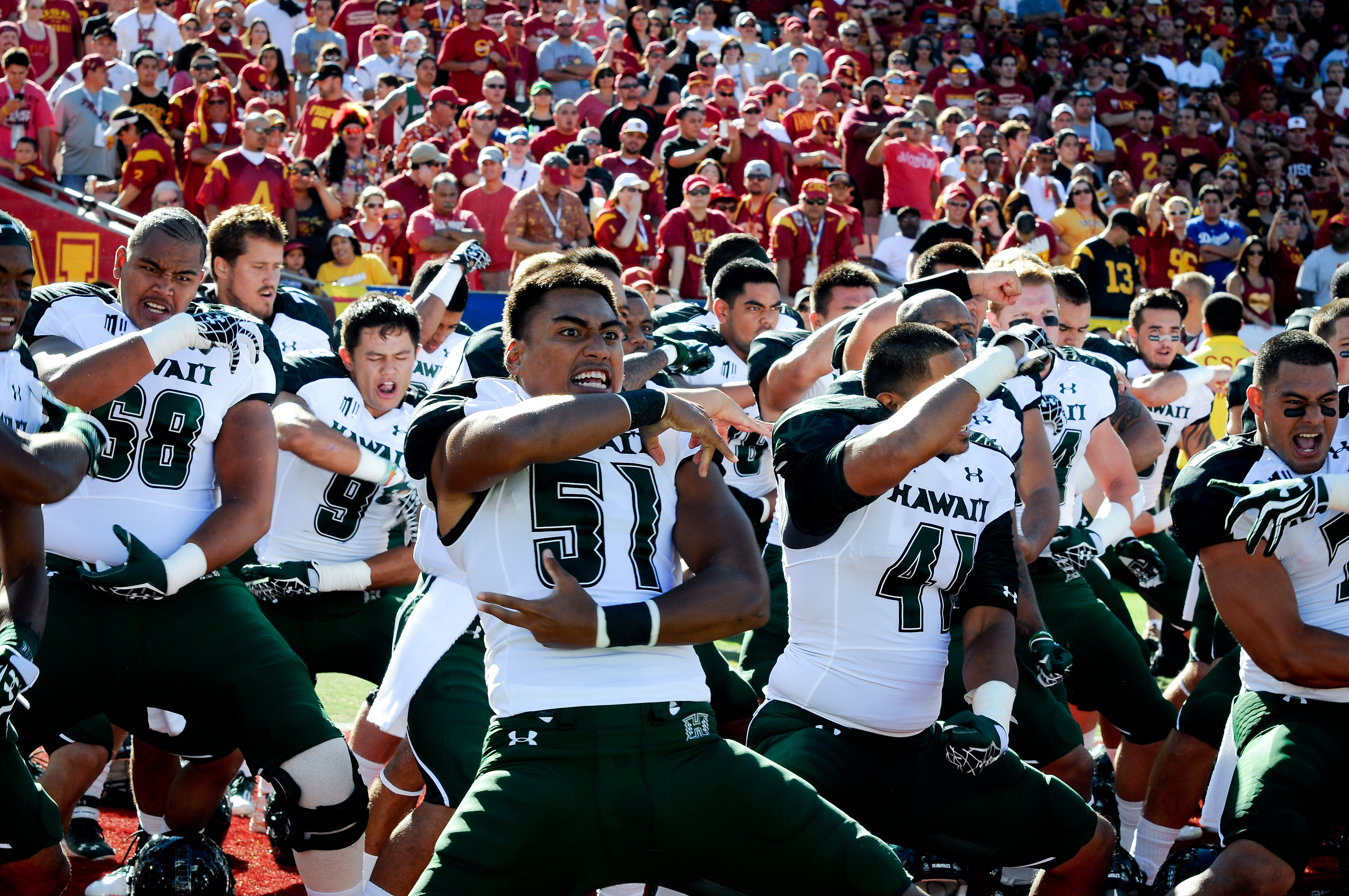
Hawaii players perform a war dance before a 2012 game at Los Angeles Memorial Coliseum

- 2012 – After 13 years of the pass–heavy run and shoot offense installed by former head coach June Jones, former Tennessee Titans offensive coordinator and new Hawaii head coach Norm Chow implements his more balanced pro-style offense. The Warriors go 3–9 on the season, with the only wins coming against UNLV and FCS opponents South Alabama and Lamar.
- 2013 – Norm Chow and the Rainbow Warriors fall to 1–11, defeating only Army in the last game of the season.
- 2014 – The season started with promise under new starter Ikaika Woolsey, but during a game versus Northern Iowa, the frustrated crowd of 20,000 was audibly booing the offense for continually running with limited passing plays. Chow described the 27–24 win as "joyless", but following a tough loss to former WAC foe Rice, the 'Bows put together the best performance of the season with a wild 38–28 win over Wyoming, capturing the Paniolo Trophy for the first time since 1992. But the team fell apart, culminating in a disheartening 28–21 loss to Fresno State following a wild 37–35 victory over UNLV. The loss salted already smashed hopes of a division title, ending the 'Bows season at 4–9.
- 2015 – The season started out with a big win for the program over Colorado but the team slumped to 2–7 and Norm Chow was fired following a program-worst 51-point conference home loss to Air Force, 58–7, with the Falcons retaining the Kuter Trophy. Chris Naeole was named the interim head coach the Sunday following the game. Later, defensive coordinator Tom Mason was reassigned to an administrative role before the season finale. But the Rainbow Warriors fought on, winning their final game of the season and finishing with an overall record of 3–10. On November 27, Nevada offensive coordinator and former UH Warrior Nick Rolovich took over as head coach, succeeding Naeole. The 107,145 in attendance for the game against Ohio State at Ohio Stadium on September 12 is the second largest crowd to ever attend a University of Hawaii football game.

=== Nick Rolovich era (2016–2019) ===
- 2016 – The 2016 college football season started with a new head coach on August 27 at the ANZ Stadium in Sydney, Australia, for a game between the Cal Golden Bears and the Hawai'i Rainbow Warriors, the first international football game for UH. Like those before it, the season started with a 51–31 loss, further heightened by a 63–3 thrashing at the hands of national power Michigan. The 110,222 in attendance for the game against Michigan at Michigan Stadium on September 3 is the largest crowd to ever attend a University of Hawaii football game. This broke the previous record attendance, which was set in 2015. The team also saw the largest ticket attendance since 2014, 28,687 in a 41–38 loss to UNLV on Homecoming Night.
- 2017 – The season saw Hawaii win their first two games over UMass and Western Carolina, but injuries to key players such as John Ursua lead to the Warriors losing 9 of their last 10 games of the season.
- 2018 – Coming off a 3–9 season, head coach Nick Rolovich decides to switch from a balanced spread option offense to the pass oriented run and shoot offense. Led by redshirt sophomore quarterback Cole McDonald, Hawaii starts the season off with a 6–1 record, before proceeding to lose the next 4 games to BYU, Nevada, Fresno State, and Utah State. Hawaii becomes bowl eligible with a 35–28 win over UNLV behind backup quarterback and true freshman Chevan Cordeiro's 3 TD passes on 5 pass attempts. Hawaii loses to former WAC rival Louisiana Tech in the Hawaii Bowl by a score of 31–14.
- 2019 – Coming off of their most successful season in 8 years, Hawaii entered the season winning a 45–38 thriller against Arizona, stopping Arizona quarterback Khalil Tate 1 yard short of the end zone as time expired. Hawaii spent the season with alternating quarterback play, with Cole McDonald starting 13 games, and Chevan Cordeiro starting 2 and replacing McDonald as starter in 10 of McDonald's 13 starts. Hawaii won their final regular season conference game against San Diego State 14–11, clinching their first division title in the history of Hawaii's play in the Mountain West Conference. Hawaii lost their Mountain West Championship to Boise State 31–10, but won their bowl game to BYU 38–34 behind Hawaii QB Cole McDonald's 493 yards and 4 TDs. Hawaii finished the season 10–5, their first ten win season since 2010, and just the seventh in program history. Head coach Nick Rolovich was named Mountain West Coach of the Year as a result, becoming the first coach to win from Hawaii during their tenure in the Mountain West.

=== Todd Graham era (2020–2021) ===
- 2020 – Coming off a ten win season and a division title, head coach Nick Rolovich suddenly departs from the program to take the head coaching position at Washington State University, taking most of his coaching staff and support staff with him. Starting quarterback Cole McDonald also departs from Hawaii, declaring for the NFL Draft. Approximately 1 week later, athletic director David Matlin announces the hire of former Arizona State head coach Todd Graham. Graham retains two assistants, Jacob Yoro and Abe Elimimian from Rolovich's staff, and hires G. J. Kinne and former Hawaii linebacker Victor Santa Cruz as offensive coordinator and defensive coordinator respectively. The Rainbow Warriors win their first game of the season against rival Fresno State, 34–19, accumulating over 300 yards of rushing and forcing four turnovers; Graham becomes the first UH head coach to win in his debut since Bob Wagner in 1987. The season was also highlighted by an upset of previously undefeated Nevada, which effectively gave the Rainbow Warriors a bowl berth ahead of San Diego State and Fresno State on a tiebreaker. They capped off the year by winning the New Mexico Bowl over Houston, 28–14. The bowl victory clinched a third straight winning season and the 100th win in Graham’s career.
- 2021 – Issues with Aloha Stadium led to that venue halting the scheduling of new events as of December 2020. As a result, the Rainbow Warriors announced plans to play home games on campus at the Clarence T. C. Ching Athletics Complex "for at least the next three years". Despite a season that saw the team reach a program-record fourth consecutive bowl game even with a 6–7 record, an upset over Fresno State, and reclaiming the Paniolo Trophy with a 38–14 win over Wyoming in Laramie, Graham resigned after multiple reports surfaced of player mistreatment on January 14, 2022. It was also later discovered the Hawaii Bowl was only canceled because Hawaii players refused to play in the game due to injuries, COVID-19 issues, and competitive disadvantages, done by a players-only vote without Graham's knowledge.

=== Timmy Chang era (2022–present) ===
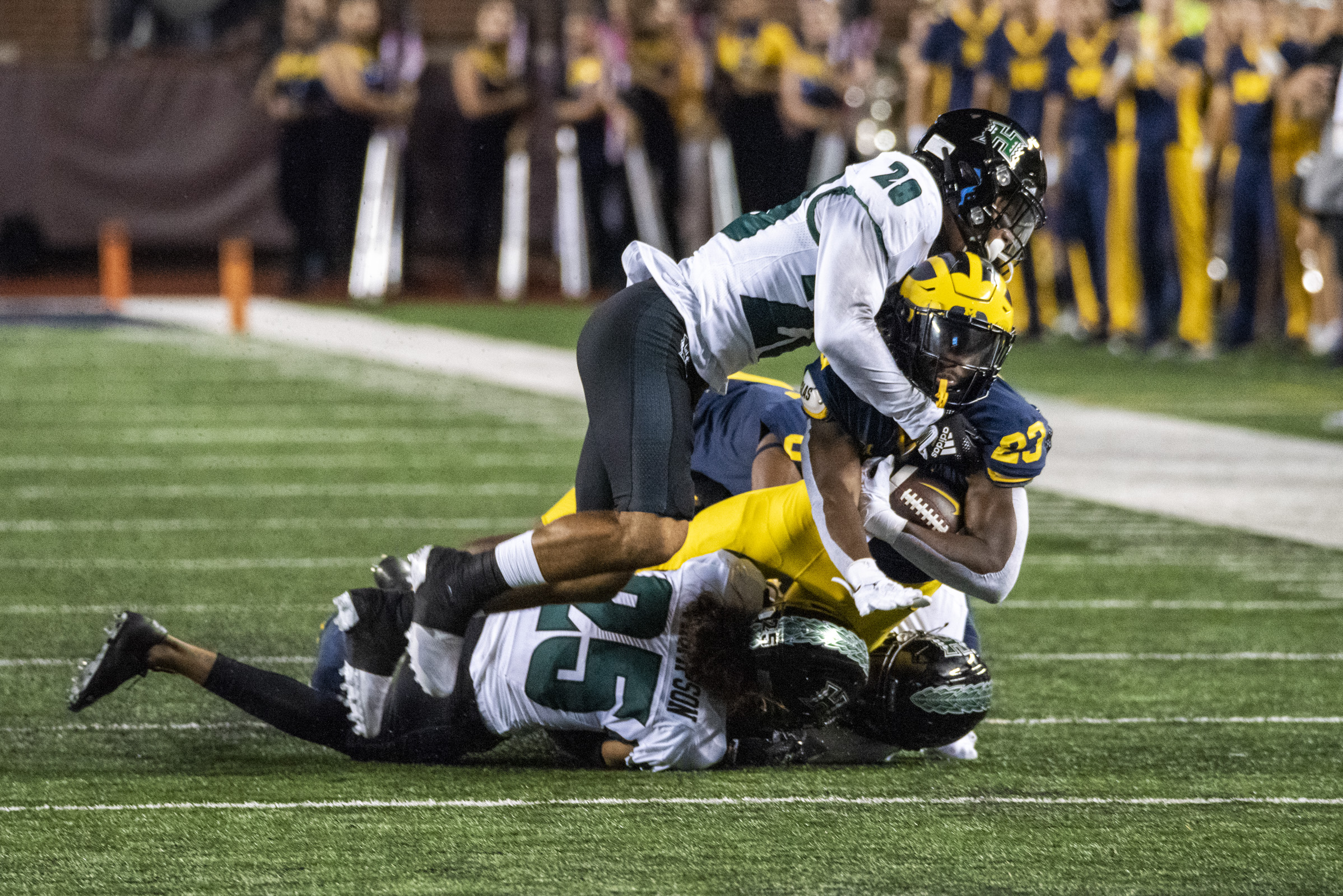
Hawaii players tackle a Michigan ball-carrier during a game in 2022

- 2022 – Following the resignation of Graham in January 2022, Hawaii signs former quarterback Timmy Chang to a four-year deal to be head coach. Jacob Yoro and Abe Elimimian were once again retained as part of the staff, but most of the rest of the staff was new, including Ian Shoemaker as offensive coordinator and quarterbacks coach. 19 players from the 2021 team transferred elsewhere in the fallout of Graham's tenure as coach, leaving the 2022 team depleted of depth. With these issues, the team struggled much of the season, recording a 3–10 record and a 2–6 record in conference.
- 2023 - In Chang's second season, Hawaii finished 5–8 with nonconference games against Vanderbilt, Stanford, Albany, and New Mexico State. San Jose State shutout Hawaii 35–0 in the Dick Tomey Legacy game. Hawaii did not qualify for a bowl.

== Conference affiliations ==
- Independent (1909–1978)
- Western Athletic Conference (1979–2011)
- Mountain West Conference (2012–present)

== Championships ==
=== Conference championships ===
Hawaii has won four conference championships, with one being outright.

Season	Conference	Coach	Record	Conference Record
1992†	WAC	Bob Wagner	11–2	6–2
1999†	WAC	June Jones	9–4	5–2
2007	WAC	June Jones	12–1	8–0
2010†	WAC	Greg McMackin	10–4	7–1

† Co-champions

=== Division championships ===
Season	Conference	Division	Coach	Conf. record	Overall record	Opponent	CG result
2019†	Mountain West	West	Nick Rolovich	5–3	10–5	Boise State	L 10–31

== Bowl games ==
Bowl games played from 1934 to 1952 were not NCAA-sanctioned. In December 1941, just prior to the attack on Pearl Harbor, Hawaiʻi was scheduled to play in a three-team round robin tournament called the Shrine Bowl, which included Hawaiʻi, San Jose State, and Willamette University of Salem, Oregon. Only one game was actually played, with Hawaiʻi defeating Willamette 20–6.

Year	Bowl	Coach	Opponent	Result
1934	New Year's Classic	Otto Klum	Santa Clara	L 7–26
1935	New Year's Classic	Otto Klum	California	W 14–0
1936	Poi Bowl	Otto Klum	USC	L 6–38
1937	Poi Bowl	Otto Klum	Honolulu All-Stars	W 18–12
1938	Poi Bowl	Otto Klum	Washington	L 13–53
1939	Poi Bowl	Otto Klum	UCLA	L 7–32
1940	Pineapple Bowl	Eugene Gill	Oregon State	L 6–39
1941	Pineapple Bowl	Eugene Gill	Fresno State	L 0–3
1947	Pineapple Bowl	Tom Kaulukukui	Utah	W 19–16
1948	Pineapple Bowl	Tom Kaulukukui	Redlands	W 33–32
1949	Pineapple Bowl	Tom Kaulukukui	Oregon State	L 27–47
1950	Pineapple Bowl	Tom Kaulukukui	Stanford	L 20–74
1951	Pineapple Bowl	Archie Kodros	Denver	W 28–27
1952	Pineapple Bowl	Hank Vasconcellos	San Diego State	L 13–34
1989	Aloha Bowl	Bob Wagner	Michigan State	L 13–33
1992	Holiday Bowl	Bob Wagner	Illinois	W 27–17
1999	Oahu Bowl	June Jones	Oregon State	W 23–17
2002	Hawai'i Bowl	June Jones	Tulane	L 28–36
2003	Hawai'i Bowl	June Jones	Houston	W 54–48
2004	Hawai'i Bowl	June Jones	UAB	W 59–40
2006	Hawai'i Bowl	June Jones	Arizona State	W 41–24
2008	Sugar Bowl †	June Jones	Georgia	L 10–41
2008	Hawai'i Bowl	Greg McMackin	Notre Dame	L 21–49
2010	Hawai'i Bowl	Greg McMackin	Tulsa	L 35–62
2016	Hawai'i Bowl	Nick Rolovich	Middle Tennessee	W 52–35
2018	Hawai'i Bowl	Nick Rolovich	Louisiana Tech	L 14–31
2019	Hawai'i Bowl	Nick Rolovich	BYU	W 38–34
2020	New Mexico Bowl	Todd Graham	Houston	W 28–14
2021	Hawai'i Bowl	Todd Graham	Memphis	Canceled ^{A}
2025	Hawai'i Bowl	Timmy Chang	California	W 35–31

† New Year's Six

- ^A The game was canceled due to Hawaii’s withdrawal due to COVID-19 and other issues.

== Head coaches ==
†	Interim head coach

Years	Season(s)	Coach	Record
1909–1911	3	Austin Jones	8–6
1912–1914	3	No team	
1915	1	John Peden	5–1–1
1916	1	William Britton	3–2–1
1917–1919	3	David L. Crawford	11–1–2
1920	1	Raymond Elliot	6–2–0
1921–1939	19	Otto Klum	82–46–7
1940–1941	2	Eugene Gill	10–6
1942–1945	4	No team	
1946–1950	5	Tom Kaulukukui	42–19–3
1951	1	Archie Kodros	4–7
1952–1960	9	Hank Vasconcellos	43–46–3
1961	1	No team	
1962–1964	3	Jim Asato	15–12
1965	1	Clark Shaughnessy	1–8–1
1966	1	Phil Sarboe	4–6
1967	1	Don King	6–4
1968–1973	6	Dave Holmes	46–17–1
1974–1976	3	Larry Price	15–18
1977–1986	10	Dick Tomey	63–46–3
1987–1995	9	Bob Wagner	58–49–3
1996–1998	3	Fred von Appen	5–31
1999–2007	9	June Jones	75–41
2008–2011	4	Greg McMackin	29–25
2012–2015	4	Norm Chow	10–36
2015	1	Chris Naeole†	1–3
2016–2019	4	Nick Rolovich	28–27
2020–2021	2	Todd Graham	11–11
2022–present	4	Timmy Chang	22–29

== Rivalries ==
=== Fresno State ===
Battle for the Golden Screwdriver

With the BYU rivalry losing steam after the Cougars left the WAC in 1999, the rivalry with Fresno State has increased greatly in recent years, with both teams being the oldest members of the WAC contending regularly for the conference championship. Coaches from both schools have accused each side of various episodes of poor sportsmanship over the years, and both schools have some of the nation's rowdiest home fans. The rivalry has featured some lopsided results, including a 70–14 Fresno victory over Hawaiʻi in 2004 and a 68–37 Warriors victory in 2006 over Fresno. In 2007, allegations that Fresno State fans were physically and verbally abused by hometown Hawaiʻi fans circulated the internet and television media added to this rivalry.

It was being reported that several Fresno State fans attempted to warn Boise State fans from attending Hawaiʻi football games due to potential violence against them, however no incidents were reported by Boise State fans and many photographs from Hawaiʻi-based publications covered incidents where Hawaiʻi and Boise State fans were seen mingling together before and after their 2007 game. The rivalry still continues to be one that is anticipated by both sides and continues to the present, with Fresno State having joined the Mountain West Conference in 2012, reuniting it with Hawaiʻi and other former WAC members in Nevada and Boise State.

It is Hawaii's most-played rivalry series. The two teams have met 57 times, with Fresno State leading the all-time series 31–25–1.

=== Air Force ===
Battle for the Kuter Trophy

This is one of the oldest rivalries involving Hawaii, along with the Fresno State rivalry. This rivalry is attributed to the late General Laurence S. Kuter, who was stationed on Joint Base Pearl Harbor-Hickam as commander of the Pacific Air Forces. This led to the creation of the Kuter Trophy, a symbol of sportsmanship and school pride, but also the eternal friendship between the Air Force and Hawaii. Hawaii is in possession of the trophy following their 44–35 win in Colorado Springs in 2025. The two teams have met 24 times, with Air Force leading the series 14–9–1.

=== Wyoming ===
Battle for the Paniolo Trophy

The rivalry began in 1978, when Hawaii joined the Western Athletic Conference, and was played annually until 1997, shortly before Wyoming departed from the WAC and joined the newly formed Mountain West Conference. The rivalry was renewed in 2013 when Hawaii joined the MW as a football-only affiliate member. The teams have met 29 times, with Wyoming leading the series 17–12. Wyoming and Hawaii play for the Paniolo Trophy. 'Paniolo' is a Hawaiian word meaning “cowboy”, and the trophy featured a bronze cowboy on horseback, twirling a lariat. The trophy was donated to the two schools by the Wyoming Paniolo Society, a group of Hawaii residents with Wyoming roots. Because the two teams could not find the original trophy, a new trophy was modeled after a statue that stands in Waimea on the Big Island at the Parker Ranch Center. Wyoming won that game in Laramie 59–56 in overtime. Before that, the last time the two schools met was in 1997 in the old Western Athletic Conference with Wyoming winning 35–6 in Honolulu. Hawaii holds the Paniolo Trophy as they won the most recent meeting, 27–7 in Honolulu.

=== San Jose State ===
Dick Tomey Legacy Game

The two schools were each led by legendary coach Dick Tomey, who died in 2019. The winner of the rivalry game each year takes possession of the Dick Tomey Legacy Trophy. San Jose State currently holds the trophy after winning the last 5 meetings, the most recent in San Jose in 2025.

The two schools first met in 1936. The Rainbow Warriors and Spartans have played each other 47 times.

The Spartans lead the series 24–22–1.

=== UNLV ===
Ninth Island Showdown

Beginning in 2017, the annual game between UNLV and Hawai'i, Ninth Island Showdown or, The Battle for the Golden Pineapple gained a rivalry trophy when the California Hotel and Casino donated the "Golden Pineapple" to the winner of the game. Las Vegas, Nevada has long been a popular destination for Hawaiians for both pleasure and relocation, so much so that it has been dubbed "the Ninth Island", with the Cal Hotel in particular aggressively marketing itself to Hawaiian tourists. UNLV is one of Hawaii's two protected Mountain West Conference rivalries when the conference shifts to one division in 2023, meaning they will play every year. The 'Bows lead the all-time series between the two schools 19–16.

=== BYU ===
Hawaii has a historic rivalry with the BYU Cougars. Both were members of the WAC from 1979 to 1998. BYU operates a satellite campus in Laie, Hawaii and there are a large number of LDS church members in the state. As well, both schools have a significant number of Polynesian descent players. In 1990, Hawaii upset #4 ranked BYU and Heisman trophy winner, Ty Detmer, 59–28. In 2001, Hawaii upset undefeated #9 BYU, 72–45. In 2019, Hawaii defeated BYU in the Hawaii Bowl, 38–34.

== Stadiums ==
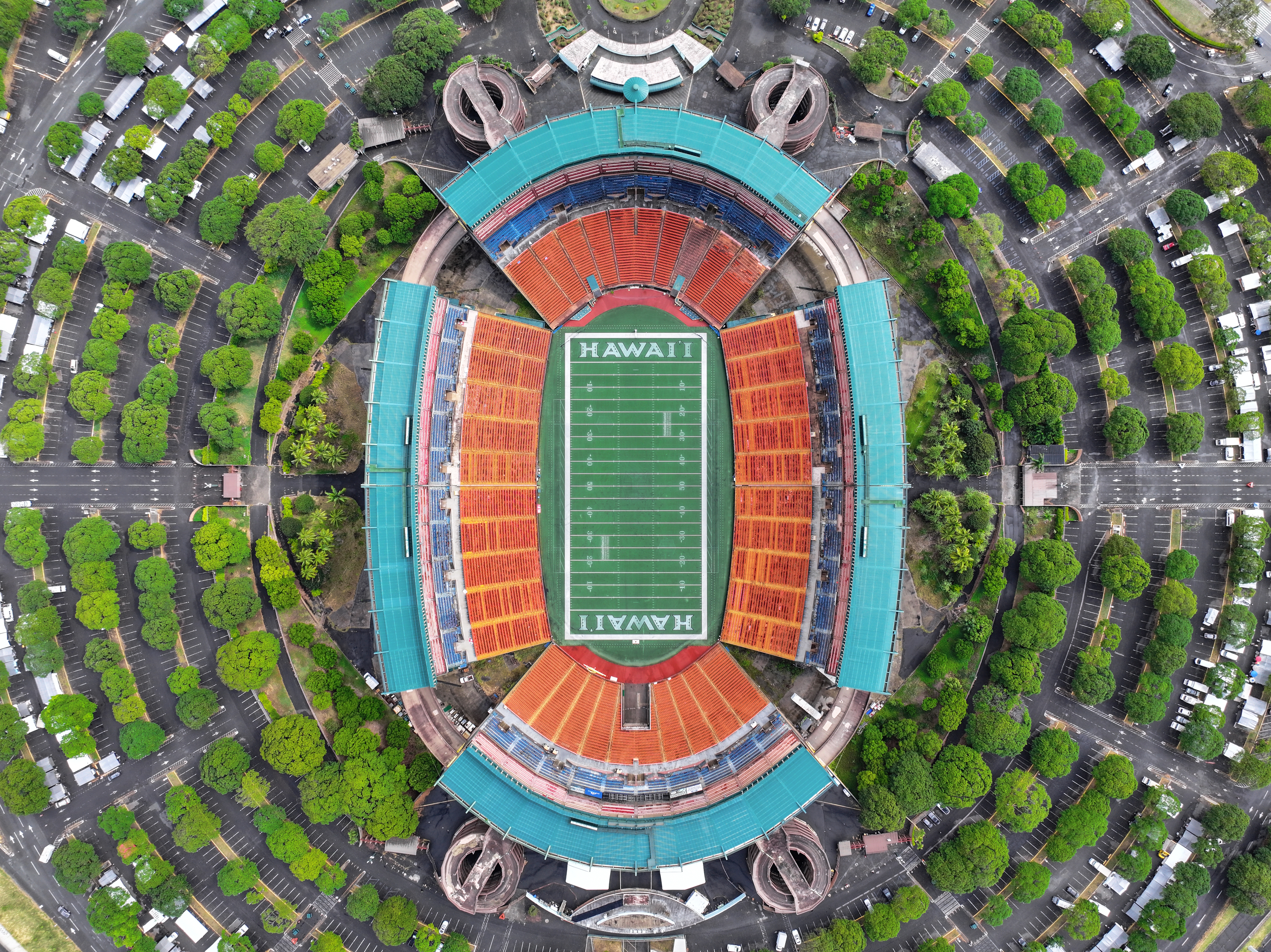
Aloha Stadium was the Warriors former home for over 4 decades

- Moiliili Field (1909–1926)
- Honolulu Stadium (1926–1974)
- Aloha Stadium (1975–2020)
- Clarence T. C. Ching Athletics Complex (2021–present)
- New Aloha Stadium (planned to open in 2029)

== Individual awards and recognitions ==
=== Retired numbers ===
Hawaii Rainbow Warriors retired numbers
No.	Player	Pos.	Tenure	No. ret.	Ref.
15	Colt Brennan	QB	2005–2007	2021	
32	Tom Kaulukukui	HB	1934–1937		

=== All-Americans ===
Consensus All-American

- Kansei Matsuzawa, 2025, K

AP All-Americans

- Kansei Matsuzawa, 2025, 1st team K
- Mike Edwards, 2012 2nd team CB/ KR
- Colt Brennan, 2007 3rd team QB
- Davone Bess, 2007 3rd team WR
- Colt Brennan, 2006 3rd team QB
- Chad Owens, 2004 2nd team KR (AP)
- Jason Elam, 1991 3rd team K
- Larry Khansmith, 1988 2nd team RS
- Al Noga, 1986 1st team DL
- Walter Murray, 1985 3rd team WR

AP Little All-Americans

- Levi Stanley, 1973 2nd team DT
- Jim Stone, 1971 3rd team DE
- Tim Buchanan, 1968 1st team LB
- Nolle Smith, 1941 1st team HB

Other All-Americans

- Jeris White, CB- 1973 (TSN-1st)
- Jeris White, DB- 1973 (Time-1st)

Scripps/FWAA Freshman All-Americans

- Davone Bess, 2005 WR
- Samson Satele, 2003 OL
- Chad Owens, 2001 KR

CoSIDA Academic All-Americans

- Chris Shinnick, 1997

=== Awards ===
Mosi Tatupu Award

- Chad Owens, 2004

Sammy Baugh Trophy

- Colt Brennan, 2006

Sporting News College Football Coach of the Year

- June Jones, 1999

=== Super Bowl Performers ===
- Larry Cole, 5× Super Bowl performer: played in (V, X, XIII) and champion in (VI, XII)
- Golden Richards, 2× Super Bowl performer: played in (X) and champion in (XII)
- Dan Audick, 1× Super Bowl champion (XVI)
- Jeris White, 1× Super Bowl champion (XVII)
- Jesse Sapolu, 4× Super Bowl champion (XIX, XXIII, XXIV, XXIX)
- Dana McLemore, 1× Super Bowl champion (XIX)
- Mark Tuinei, 3× Super Bowl champion (XXVII, XXVIII, XXX)
- Jason Elam, 2× Super Bowl champion (XXXII, XXXIII)
- Maa Tanuvasa, 2× Super Bowl champion (XXXII, XXXIII)
- Adrian Klemm, 3× Super Bowl champion (XXXVI, XXXVIII, XXXIX)
- Kimo Von Oelhoffen, 1× Super Bowl champion (XL)
- Travis LaBoy, 1× Super Bowl performer: played in (XLIII)
- Isaac Sopoaga, 1× Super Bowl performer: played in (XLVII)
- Marcus Kemp, 2× Super Bowl champion (LIV, LVII)

== Notable players ==
- Dan Audick – former Super Bowl champion with the San Francisco 49ers.
- Dino Babers – Current offensive coordinator at Arizona (2024–present). Former head coach at Syracuse (2016–2023) Eastern Illinois (2012–2013) and Bowling Green (2014–2015). Former Hawaii running back, defensive back (1979–1983) and graduate assistant (1984).
- Davone Bess – Wide receiver, Miami Dolphins (2008–2012), Cleveland Browns (2013). Former Hawai'i wide receiver (2005–2007).
- Rick Blangiardi – former Hawaiʻi linebacker (1965–1966). Former Hawaiʻi assistant coach (1972–1976). Former television executive and current mayor of Honolulu.
- Colt Brennan – former Hawai'i quarterback (2005–2007). Taken with the 186th overall pick in the 6th round of the 2008 NFL draft by the Washington Redskins (2008–2009). Oakland Raiders (2010), Hartford Colonials – UFL (2011), Saskatchewan Roughriders – CFL (2012), LA KISS – AFL (2014). 2007 Heisman Trophy Award Finalist.
- Tim Carey – Arena Football League player
- Timmy Chang – former Hawaiʻi quarterback (2000–04). Former tight ends coach for the Nevada Wolf Pack, now the current head coach as of 2022.
- Larry Cole – Five-time Super Bowl performer and champion with the Dallas Cowboys. Former Hawaiʻi student athlete.
- Jason Elam – Kicker taken with the 70th overall pick in the 3rd round of the 1993 NFL draft by the Denver Broncos. Two-time Super Bowl champion (1997 & 1998) and 3x Pro Bowl selection (1995, 1998 & 2001). Denver Broncos (1993–2007, 2010), Atlanta Falcons (2008–2009). Previously tied with Tom Dempsey and Sebastian Janikowski for the longest field goal in NFL history (63 yards).
- Abe Elimimian – former Hawaiʻi cornerback (2000–2004). Current Hawaii assistant coach (2015–present).
- Rich Ellerson – former head coach at Southern Utah (1996), Cal Poly (2001–2008) and Army (2008–2013).
- Kynan Forney – Offensive lineman taken with the 219th overall pick in the 7th round of the 2001 NFL draft by the Atlanta Falcons.
- Keith Gilbertson – former head coach at Idaho (1986–1988), Cal-Berkeley (1992–1995) and current assistant coach for the Seattle Seahawks (2005–2008) . Attended school.
- Kevin M. Gilbride – Son of former San Diego Chargers head coach Kevin Gilbride. Former tight ends coach for the New York Giants and the Chicago Bears. Former Hawaii backup quarterback.
- Wayne Hunter – Offensive lineman taken with the 73rd overall pick in the 3rd round of the 2003 NFL draft by the Seattle Seahawks.
- Ivin Jasper – Current offensive coordinator and quarterbacks coach at Navy (2008–present). Former Hawaii quarterback (1991–1994).
- June Jones – former Hawaiʻi head coach and QB. Current head coach and general manager for the Houston Roughnecks of the XFL. Former head coach for the Atlanta Falcons (1994–1996), San Diego Chargers (1998), and SMU (2008–2014) and former offensive coordinator for the Hamilton Tiger-Cats of the Canadian Football League. Led Hawaiʻi to two WAC championships.
- Kurt Kafentzis – NFL defensive back for the Houston Oilers
- Mark Kafentzis – NFL defensive back for the Cleveland Browns and Baltimore/Indianapolis Colts
- Marcus Kemp – Wide Receiver, Super Bowl LIV champion with the Kansas City Chiefs (2017–19).
- Adrian Klemm – Offensive lineman taken with the 46th overall pick of the 2nd round of the 2000 NFL draft by the New England Patriots. 3x Super Bowl Champion with the New England Patriots, current assistant offensive line coach for the Pittsburgh Steelers.
- Travis LaBoy – Linebacker taken with the 42nd overall pick in the 2nd round of the 2004 NFL draft by the Tennessee Titans. Played for the Titans (2004–2007), Arizona Cardinals (2008), San Francisco 49ers (2010), and San Diego Chargers (2011).
- Ashley Lelie – Wide receiver taken with the 19th overall pick in the 1st round of the 2002 NFL draft by the Denver Broncos (2002–2005). Atlanta Falcons (2006), San Francisco 49ers (2007), Oakland Raiders (2008), Kansas City Chiefs (2009).
- Kansei Matsuzawa – Placekicker (2024–2025); consensus All-American in 2025.
- Kim McCloud – former Hawaiʻi defensive back, (1987–1990). Current Hawaiʻi defensive analyst (2020–present).
- Cole McDonald – Quarterback taken with the 224th pick in the 7th round of the 2020 NFL draft by the Tennessee Titans.
- Rich Miano – Safety taken with the 166th pick in the 6th round of the 1985 NFL draft by the New York Jets. Played for the New York Jets (1985–1989), Philadelphia Eagles (1991–1994), and Atlanta Falcons (1995). Former all WAC defensive back and associate head coach for Hawaii. Current Spectrum Sports Color Analyst.
- Ken Niumatalolo – Current head coach at San Jose State Spartans (2024–present), formerly Navy (2008–2022). Former Hawaii quarterback (1987–1989).
- Al Noga – Defensive lineman, Minnesota Vikings (1988–1992), Washington Redskins (1993), Indianapolis Colts (1994).
- Brian Norwood – Current assistant head coach, passing game coordinator and defensive backs coach at UCLA (2020–present). Former Hawaii defensive back (1984–1987).
- Joe Onosai – former Hawaiʻi football player, and World's Strongest Man competitor. Current defensive line coach for the Pac-5 Wolfpack, a Hawaii High School team.
- Leonard Peters – former Hawaiʻi safety (2004–2007). Has represented the USA in Rugby Union, Rugby League, and Rugby Sevens.
- Golden Richards – Two-time Super Bowl performer and champion with the Dallas Cowboys. Attended UH: 1972–1973. Former Hawaiʻi student athlete.
- Nick Rolovich – Former head coach at Hawaiʻi (2016–2019), Washington State (2020–2021). Former Hawaiʻi quarterback (2000–01) and QB coach/offensive coordinator (2008–11). Played in the AFL (2003–2007). Former offensive coordinator/QB coach for the Nevada Wolf Pack (2012–2015).
- Rigoberto Sanchez – Punter, Indianapolis Colts (2017–present). Pro Football Writer's Association All Rookie Team (2017).
- Victor Santa Cruz - Current defensive coordinator at Hawaii (2020–present). Former head coach at Azusa Pacific (2006–2019). Former linebacker for Hawaii (1990–1994).
- Jesse Sapolu – Offensive lineman, San Francisco 49ers (1983–1997). Two-time Pro Bowler, four-time Super Bowl champion.
- Larry Sherrer – former Hawaiʻi running back. Played in the CFL for Montreal Alouettes (1973–1975) and BC Lions (1976).
- Brian Smith – former Hawaiʻi center and long snapper (1998–2001). Former Hawaiʻi associate head coach and offensive coordinator (2016–2019), assistant coach (2004, 2008–11). offensive coordinator and running backs coach at Washington State (2020–present).
- David Stant – former Hawaiʻi lineman. Current head coach for the Keio Unicorns of the Kantoh Collegiate American Football Association.
- Craig Stutzmann – former Hawai'i wide receiver (1998–2001) and assistant coach (2008, 2016–2019).
- Scott Swift – former Hawaiʻi linebacker and center (1970). Stockbroker and father of Taylor Swift.
- Maa Tanuvasa – Defensive lineman, Los Angeles Rams (1994), Denver Broncos (1995–2000), San Diego Chargers (2001). Two-time Super Bowl champion.
- Jahlani Tavai – Linebacker taken with the 43rd overall pick in the 2nd round of the 2019 NFL draft by the Detroit Lions.
- Mark Tuinei – Offensive lineman, Dallas Cowboys (1983–1997). Two-time Pro Bowler and three-time Super Bowl champion.
- Jeff Ulbrich – Linebacker taken with the 86th overall pick in the 3rd round of the 2000 NFL draft by the San Francisco 49ers. Former defensive coordinator for the UCLA Bruins. Current defensive coordinator for the New York Jets.
- John Ursua – Wide receiver taken with the 236th overall pick in the 7th round of the 2019 NFL draft by the Seattle Seahawks.

== Notable coaches ==
- Dave Aranda – Current head coach at Baylor (2020–present). Former Hawaii defensive coordinator (2010–2011).
- Robert Anae – Current offensive coordinator at Virginia (2016–present). Former Hawaii graduate assistant (1986–1987).
- Brent Brennan – Current head coach at Arizona (2024–present). Former Hawaii graduate assistant (1998).
- Jerry Burns – former head coach at Iowa (1961–1965) and for the Minnesota Vikings (1986–1991). Former Hawaiʻi assistant coach.
- Dom Capers – former head coach of the Carolina Panthers (1995–98) and Houston Texans (2002–05). Former Hawaiʻi assistant coach.
- Tyson Helton – Current head coach at Western Kentucky (2019–present). Former Hawaii assistant coach (2000–2003).
- Paul Johnson – former head coach at Georgia Southern (1997–2001), Navy (2002–2007), and Georgia Tech (2008–2018). Former Hawaiʻi assistant coach.
- Jeff Monken – Current head coach at Army (2014–present). Former Hawaiʻi graduate assistant. (1989–1990)
- Larry Price – former Hawaiʻi head coach and former radio personality on 92.3 KSSK in Honolulu.
- Adam Rita – Former CFL coach and general manager. Won 79th Grey Cup as head coach. Former Hawaiʻi assistant coach (1979–1982).
- Roy Shivers – former Hawaiʻi assistant coach and former general manager of the Saskatchewan Roughriders.
- Dick Tomey – former Arizona head coach (1987–2000), Hawaiʻi head coach, head coach at San Jose State (2005–2009), and associate athletic director for sports administration at the University of South Florida (2015–2016).
- Bob Wagner – former Hawaiʻi head coach.

== Future non-conference games ==
The NCAA permits Hawaiʻi to play one more than the normal 12 games during the regular season to recoup its unusually high travel costs to and from the mainland. The team's opponents who play at Hawaiʻi each season are also allowed one more game than their normal limit. This rule was modified before the 2016 season; Hawaii is now open to play before Labor Day Weekend (during FCS Kickoff Week).

The exemption was modified to avoid a 13-game schedule with no bye weeks.

Announced schedules as of March 6, 2026.

2026	2027	2028	2029	2030	2031	2032
at Stanford	Northwestern State	Kansas	Arizona	at Stanford		at Kansas
New Mexico State	at New Mexico State	Fordham	San Diego State	at Washington		
at Arizona State	UCLA	at UCLA				
Sacramento State		at San Diego State				
