= 2022 Colorado State Rams football team =

American college football season

2022 Colorado State Rams football
- Conference: Mountain West Conference
- Mountain Division
- Record: 3–9 (3–5 MW)
- Head coach: Jay Norvell (1st season)
- Offensive coordinator: Matt Mumme (1st season)
- Offensive scheme: Air raid
- Defensive coordinator: Freddie Banks (1st season)
- Base defense: 4–2–5
- Home stadium: Canvas Stadium

Uniform
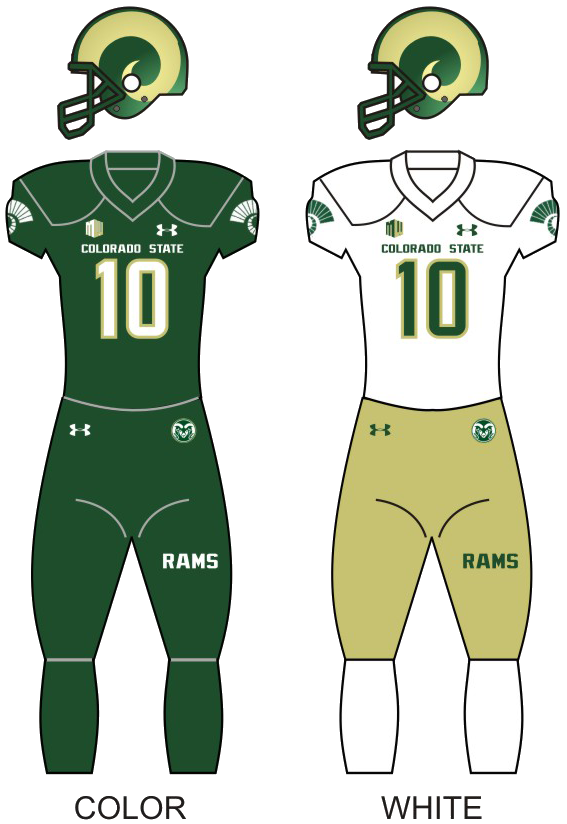

2022 Mountain West Conference football standings
| | Conf. | | | Overall |
| Team | W | | L | W | | L |
|---|---|---|---|---|---|---|
Mountain Division
| Boise State xy | 8 | – | 0 | 10 | – | 4 |
| Air Force | 5 | – | 3 | 10 | – | 3 |
| Wyoming | 5 | – | 3 | 7 | – | 6 |
| Utah State | 5 | – | 3 | 6 | – | 7 |
| Colorado State | 3 | – | 5 | 3 | – | 9 |
| New Mexico | 0 | – | 8 | 2 | – | 10 |
West Division
| No. 24 Fresno State xy$ | 7 | – | 1 | 10 | – | 4 |
| San Diego State | 5 | – | 3 | 7 | – | 6 |
| San Jose State | 5 | – | 3 | 7 | – | 5 |
| UNLV | 3 | – | 5 | 5 | – | 7 |
| Hawaii | 2 | – | 6 | 3 | – | 10 |
| Nevada | 0 | – | 8 | 2 | – | 10 |
Championship: Fresno State 28, Boise State 16
$ – Conference champion; x – Division champion/co-champions; y – Championship game participant; Rankings from AP Poll

The 2022 Colorado State Rams football team represented Colorado State University as a member of the Mountain Division of the Mountain West Conference (MW) during the 2022 NCAA Division I FBS football season. Led by first-year head coach Jay Norvell, the Rams compiled an overall record of 3–9 with a mark of 3–5 in conference play, placing fifth in the MW's Mountain Division. Colorado State played home games at Sonny Lubick Field at Canvas Stadium in Fort Collins, Colorado,

== Preseason ==
=== Incoming transfers ===
As of February 16, 2022, Colorado State has added 21 transfers prior to the 2022 season, per the Coloradoan and 247Sports. Eleven of those transfers signed as part of the 2022 early signing class, which consisted of 22 athletes — 11 transfers and 11 high school recruits.

| Position | Name | Year | High School | Hometown | Previous School |
|---|---|---|---|---|---|
| QB | Clay Millen | Rd. Freshman | Mount Si | Snoqualmie, WA | Nevada |
| RB | Avery Morrow | Junior | Garfield | Seattle, WA | Nevada |
| WR | Matt Greenwald | Rd. Sophomore | Fairview | Boulder, CO | Boise State |
| WR | Tory Horton | Junior | Washington Union | Fresno, CA | Nevada |
| WR | Melquan Stovall | Senior | Junipero Serra | Lancaster, CA | Nevada |
| TE/LB | Peter Montini | Junior | Foothill | Pleasanton, CA | Nevada |
| OL | Dontae Keys | Grad. Student | Jack Britt | Fayetteville, NC | FIU |
| OL | Gray Davis | Grad. Student | Parish Episcopal | Dallas, TX | Nevada |
| OL | Jacob Gardner | Junior | Los Osos | Rancho Cucamonga, CA | Nevada |
| OL | Dante Bivens | Grad. Student | Klein Collins | Houston, TX | Tulsa |
| OL | Trevyn Heil | Rd. Freshman | Grandview | Aurora, CO | Nevada |
| DL/OLB | C.J. Onyechi | Grad. Student | West Orange | West Orange, NJ | Rutgers |
| DL | Teivis Tuioti | Rd. Sophomore | Lincoln Southeast | Lincoln, NE | Nevada |
| DB | Chigozie Anusiem | Rd. Senior | Sonora | La Habra, CA | California |
| DB | Donavann Collins | Rd. Junior | Cedar Hill | Cedar Hill, TX | TCU |
| DB | D'Andre Greeley | Sophomore | Bullard | Fresno, CA | CCSF |
| DB | AJ King | Junior | Locke Academy | Los Angeles, CA | Nevada |
| DB | Greg Laday | Rd. Junior | Memorial | Port Arthur, TX | Northern Colorado |
| K | Henry Katleman | Rd. Junior | Malibu | Topanga, CA | Oregon |
| P | Paddy Turner | Rd. Freshman | Marian College | Ararat, Victoria, Australia | Nevada |
| ATH | Vann Schield | Sophomore | Rock Canyon | Castle Pines, CO | CSU Pueblo |

=== Recruiting class of 2022 ===
Colorado State football signed 11 recruits as part of their 2022 early signing class, per 247Sports.com.

Star ratings vary by recruiting service; star ratings below are 247Sports Composite ratings, a composite average of ratings across major recruiting services provided by 247Sports.com.

| Position | Name | High School | Hometown | Star Rating | Rating* | Other Offers | Commitment Date | Signing Date† |
|---|---|---|---|---|---|---|---|---|
| QB | Brayden Fowler-Nicolosi | Aledo | Aledo, TX | | 0.8418 | Arizona, Arkansas St., Middle Tenn., Nevada, Oregon St., Pittsburgh, Toledo | December 14, 2021 | December 15, 2021 |
| QB | Jackson Stratton | La Jolla | La Jolla, CA | | 0.8559 | Brown, Columbia, FIU, Nevada, Oregon St., Penn, Washington, Washington St. | December 15, 2021 | December 15, 2021 |
| WR | Mekhi Fox | Pasadena | Pasadena, CA | ‡ | 0.8888 | Arizona St., Florida, FAU, Nebraska, Nevada, Oregon, UCLA, Utah, USC | December 15, 2021 | December 15, 2021 |
| WR | Louis Brown | Inglewood | South Los Angeles, CA | | 0.8178 | Arizona State, Nevada | December 14, 2021 | December 15, 2021 |
| WR | Justus Ross-Simmons | Inglewood | Rochester, NY | | 0.8382 | Nevada | December 14, 2021 | December 15, 2021 |
| WR | Ky Oday Jr. | Cherry Creek | Denver, CO | | 0.7993 | Air Force, Northern Arizona, Northern Colorado, Penn, Wyoming | June 7, 2021 | December 15, 2021 |
| TE | Jordan Williams | St. Paul | Santa Fe Springs, CA | | 0.8426 | None | December 14, 2021 | December 15, 2021 |
| OL | Aubrey Scott | Leuzinger | Compton, CA | | 0.8410 | Arizona, Arizona St., Boise St., Kansas, Nevada, UNLV, Utah | December 14, 2021 | December 15, 2021 |
| OL | Aaron Karas | Pomona | Arvada, CO | | 0.7943 | Air Force, Army, Nevada | December 12, 2021 | December 15, 2021 |
| LB | Marshon Oxley | Inglewood | South Los Angeles, CA | | 0.8464 | Colorado, Kansas, Michigan St., San Diego St., San Jose St., UNLV | December 14, 2021 | December 15, 2021 |
| DB | Corey Lambert Jr. | Brother Martin | Harvey, LA | | 0.8365 | Austin Peay, Columbia, Duke, FAU, Illinois, Memphis, Nevada, Penn, Princeton, Southern Miss, Troy, Tulane | December 15, 2021 | December 15, 2021 |

*= 247Sports Composite rating; ratings are out of 1.00. (five stars= 1.00–.98, four stars= .97–.90, three stars= .80–.89, two stars= .79–.70, no stars= <70)
†= National Signing Days for 2022 class: Early: December 15, 2021. Regular: February 2, 2022.
‡= Despite being rated as a four star recruit by ESPN and 247Sports.com, Fox received a three star 247Sports Composite rating.

The 2022 early recruiting class included three teammates at Inglewood High School — Louis Brown, Justus Ross-Simmons, and Marshon Oxley. The class was highlighted by multiple players who flipped commitments from Nevada to Colorado State to stay with head coach Jay Norvell, as well as the class's highest rated recruit, Mekhi Fox, who flipped from UCLA to Colorado State. The class consisted of six recruits from California, two from Colorado, and one from Texas, New York, and Louisiana.

According to the Coloradoan, four other players have committed to the team, but have not signed a National Letter of Intent. They may sign a NLI at a later date, join the team as a walk-on, or play elsewhere. Either way, these players were not considered part of the official signing class:

- Logan Flinta, wide receiver Aledo High School (Aledo, TX)
- Brannan Mannix, defensive back Colleyville Heritage High School (Colleyville, TX)
- Brady Radz, long snapper Cherry Creek High School (Greenwood Village, CO)
- Trey Balsbaugh, kicker/punter Bishop Gorman High School (Las Vegas, NV)

== Staff ==
=== Coaching changes ===
- Head coach: On December 2, 2021, Colorado State announced that they had fired head coach Steve Addazio after two seasons. Addazio posted a record of 4–12 in his two years as head coach of the Rams. Four days later, on December 6, 2021, Nevada's head coach Jay Norvell was hired as Colorado State's next head coach. Norvell became the program's 24th head coach and the first Black head coach in school history. Addazio was later hired by Texas A&M as an offensive line coach.
- Offensive coordinator: Nevada's offensive coordinator Matt Mumme was hired as Colorado State's new offensive coordinator and associate head coach. He replaced former offensive coordinator Jon Budmayr after one season.
- Defensive coordinator: Montana State's defensive coordinator Freddie Banks was hired as Colorado State's new defensive coordinator. He replaced former defensive coordinator Chuck Heater after two seasons. Banks had worked with Norvell previously, serving as Nevada's cornerbacks coach in 2020.
- Special teams coordinator: UTSA special teams coordinator Tommy Perry was hired to fill the team's special teams coordinator position that was left vacant during Addazio's tenure.
- Running backs coach: Jeremy Moses was hired as Colorado State's new running backs coach. He replaced former running backs coach Brian White.
- Wide receivers coach: Nevada's wide receivers coach Timmy Chang was originally one of the many Nevada coaches planning to follow Norvell to Colorado State, but was later hired by Hawaii as their new head coach. Nevada's tight end coach Chad Savage took the job instead.
- Tight ends coach: James Finley, the wide receivers coach and recruiting coordinator at California high school Mater Dei, was hired as Colorado State's new tight ends coach. He replaced former tight ends coach Cody Booth.
- Offensive line coach: Nevada's offensive line coach Bill Best was hired as Colorado State's new offensive line coach. He replaced former offensive line coach Louie Addazio, who was hired by Nevada.
- Defensive line coach: North Dakota State's defensive ends coach Buddha Williams was hired as Colorado State's new defensive line coach. He replaced former defensive line and assistant head coach Antoine Smith.
- Cornerbacks coach: Marcus Patton was hired by CSU as their new cornerbacks coach. He was previously the defensive coordinator at Tarleton State.
- Linebackers coach: Montana State's defensive line coach Adam Pilapil followed defensive coordinator Freddie Banks to Colorado State to become the team's new linebackers coach. He replaced former linebackers coach Sean Cronin.
- Strength and conditioning coach: Nevada's head strength and conditioning coach Jordan Simmons was hired for the same job at Colorado State.

=== 2022 coaching staff ===
| Name | Position | Season at Colorado State (in current position) | Alma mater |
|---|---|---|---|
| Jay Norvell | Head coach | 1st | Iowa |
| Matt Mumme | Offensive coordinator/Associate head coach | 1st | Kentucky |
| Freddie Banks | Defensive coordinator | 1st | North Dakota State |
| Tommy Perry | Special Teams Coordinator | 1st | Texas A&M |
| James Finley | Tight ends coach | 1st | Oregon |
| Jeremy Moses | Running backs coach | 1st | Stephen F. Austin |
| Chad Savage | Wide receivers coach | 1st | San Diego |
| Bill Best | Offensive line coach | 1st | Louisiana–Monroe |
| Marcus Patton | Cornerbacks coach | 1st | Kansas State |
| Buddha Williams | Defensive line coach | 1st | Charleston |
| Adam Pilapil | Linebackers coach | 1st | Wyoming |
| Jordan Simmons | Head strength and conditioning coach | 1st | Lenoir–Rhyne |

== Schedule ==
| Date | Time | Opponent | Site | TV | Result | Attendance |
|---|---|---|---|---|---|---|
| September 3 | 10:00 a.m. | at No. 8 Michigan* | Michigan Stadium; Ann Arbor, MI | ABC | L 7–51 | 109,575 |
| September 10 | 2:00 p.m. | Middle Tennessee* | Canvas Stadium; Fort Collins, CO | KCDO | L 19–34 | 27,641 |
| September 17 | 3:00 p.m. | at Washington State* | Martin Stadium; Pullman, WA | P12N | L 7–38 | 23,611 |
| September 24 | 2:00 p.m. | No. 7 (FCS) Sacramento State* | Canvas Stadium; Fort Collins, CO | KCDO | L 10–41 | 25,445 |
| October 7 | 8:30 p.m. | at Nevada | Mackay Stadium; Reno, NV | FS1 | W 17–14 | 18,255 |
| October 15 | 5:00 p.m. | Utah State^{†} | Canvas Stadium; Fort Collins, CO | CBSSN | L 13–17 | 35,009 |
| October 22 | 2:00 p.m. | Hawaii | Canvas Stadium; Fort Collins, CO | SPEC PPV | W 17–13 | 22,843 |
| October 29 | 5:00 p.m. | at Boise State | Albertsons Stadium; Boise, ID | FS1 | L 10–49 | 33,895 |
| November 5 | 8:30 p.m. | at San Jose State | CEFCU Stadium; San Jose, CA | NBCSBA | L 16–28 | 16,382 |
| November 12 | 5:00 p.m. | Wyoming | Canvas Stadium; Fort Collins, CO (Border War) | CBSSN | L 13–14 | 30,300 |
| November 19 | 7:00 p.m. | at Air Force | Falcon Stadium; Colorado Springs, CO (rivalry) | FS2 | L 12–24 | 20,121 |
| November 25 | 1:30 p.m. | New Mexico | Canvas Stadium; Fort Collins, CO | CBSSN | W 17–0 | 20,107 |
*Non-conference game; ^{†}Homecoming; Rankings from AP Poll (and CFP Rankings, after November 2) - Released prior to game; All times are in Mountain time

== Game summaries ==
=== At No. 8 Michigan ===
| | 1 | 2 | 3 | 4 | Total |
|---|---|---|---|---|---|
| Rams | 0 | 0 | 0 | 7 | 7 |
| No. 8 Wolverines | 10 | 13 | 14 | 14 | 51 |

| Statistics | CSU | MICH |
|---|---|---|
| First downs | 14 | 25 |
| Total yards | 219 | 440 |
| Rushing yards | 82 | 234 |
| Passing yards | 137 | 206 |
| Turnovers | 2 | 0 |
| Time of possession | 29:30 | 30:30 |

| Team | Category | Player | Statistics |
|---|---|---|---|
| Colorado State | Passing | Clay Millen | 16/20, 137 yards, TD, INT |
| Colorado State | Rushing | Ajon Vivens | 10 rushes, 35 yards |
| Colorado State | Receiving | Tory Horton | 6 receptions, 69 yards, TD |
| Michigan | Passing | Cade McNamara | 9/18, 136 yards, TD |
| Michigan | Rushing | Blake Corum | 13 rushes, 76 yards, TD |
| Michigan | Receiving | Roman Wilson | 2 receptions, 65 yards, TD |

=== Middle Tennessee State ===
| | 1 | 2 | 3 | 4 | Total |
|---|---|---|---|---|---|
| Blue Raiders | 10 | 17 | 7 | 0 | 34 |
| Rams | 0 | 0 | 19 | 0 | 19 |

| Statistics | MTSU | CSU |
|---|---|---|
| First downs | 20 | 16 |
| Total yards | 380 | 246 |
| Rushing yards | 114 | -10 |
| Passing yards | 266 | 256 |
| Turnovers | 2 | 4 |
| Time of possession | 31:19 | 28:41 |

| Team | Category | Player | Statistics |
|---|---|---|---|
| Middle Tennessee | Passing | Chase Cunningham | 31/39, 266 yards, TD, INT |
| Middle Tennessee | Rushing | Frank Peasant | 22 rushes, 93 yards, 2 TD |
| Middle Tennessee | Receiving | Izaiah Gathings | 11 receptions, 92 yards |
| Colorado State | Passing | Clay Millen | 20/30, 256 yards, 3 TD, 2 INT |
| Colorado State | Rushing | Ajon Vivens | 12 rushes, 41 yards |
| Colorado State | Receiving | Tory Horton | 9 receptions, 186 yards, 3 TD |

=== At Washington State ===
| | 1 | 2 | 3 | 4 | Total |
|---|---|---|---|---|---|
| Rams | 0 | 0 | 0 | 7 | 7 |
| Cougars | 21 | 7 | 3 | 7 | 38 |

| Statistics | CSU | WSU |
|---|---|---|
| First downs | 14 | 21 |
| Total yards | 249 | 442 |
| Rushing yards | 37 | 143 |
| Passing yards | 212 | 299 |
| Turnovers | 2 | 2 |
| Time of possession | 32:37 | 27:23 |

| Team | Category | Player | Statistics |
|---|---|---|---|
| Colorado State | Passing | Clay Millen | 25/35, 212 yards, TD, INT |
| Colorado State | Rushing | Avery Morrow | 8 rushes, 28 yards |
| Colorado State | Receiving | Ty McCullouch | 4 receptions, 57 yards |
| Washington State | Passing | Cam Ward | 24/34, 299 yards, 4 TD, INT |
| Washington State | Rushing | Nakia Watson | 8 rushes, 74 yards |
| Washington State | Receiving | Donovan Ollie | 7 receptions, 82 yards, 2 TD |

=== No. 7 (FCS) Sacramento State ===
| | 1 | 2 | 3 | 4 | Total |
|---|---|---|---|---|---|
| No. 7 (FCS) Hornets | 7 | 17 | 7 | 10 | 41 |
| Rams | 0 | 10 | 0 | 0 | 10 |

| Statistics | SAC | CSU |
|---|---|---|
| First downs | 25 | 10 |
| Total yards | 395 | 253 |
| Rushing yards | 160 | 75 |
| Passing yards | 235 | 178 |
| Turnovers | 1 | 1 |
| Time of possession | 33:58 | 26:02 |

| Team | Category | Player | Statistics |
|---|---|---|---|
| Sacramento State | Passing | Jake Dunniway | 12/23, 164 yards, TD, INT |
| Sacramento State | Rushing | Cameron Skattebo | 17 rushes, 67 yards, TD |
| Sacramento State | Receiving | Cameron Skattebo | 3 receptions, 56 yards |
| Colorado State | Passing | Brayden Fowler-Nicolosi | 6/15, 116 yards, TD |
| Colorado State | Rushing | Ajon Vivens | 10 rushes, 31 yards |
| Colorado State | Receiving | Tory Horton | 3 receptions, 127 yards, TD |

=== At Nevada ===
| | 1 | 2 | 3 | 4 | Total |
|---|---|---|---|---|---|
| Rams | 14 | 0 | 0 | 3 | 17 |
| Wolf Pack | 0 | 7 | 0 | 7 | 14 |

| Statistics | CSU | NEV |
|---|---|---|
| First downs | 13 | 19 |
| Total yards | 255 | 358 |
| Rushing yards | 177 | 114 |
| Passing yards | 78 | 244 |
| Turnovers | 3 | 2 |
| Time of possession | 28:13 | 31:47 |

| Team | Category | Player | Statistics |
|---|---|---|---|
| Colorado State | Passing | Brayden Fowler-Nicolosi | 11/22, 78 yards, 2 INT |
| Colorado State | Rushing | Avery Morrow | 24 carries, 168 yards |
| Colorado State | Receiving | Tory Horton | 9 receptions, 64 yards |
| Nevada | Passing | Nate Cox | 20/42, 244 yards, INT |
| Nevada | Rushing | Toa Taua | 23 carries, 80 yards, 2 TD |
| Nevada | Receiving | BJ Casteel | 9 receptions, 87 yards |

=== Utah State ===
| | 1 | 2 | 3 | 4 | Total |
|---|---|---|---|---|---|
| Aggies | 7 | 0 | 10 | 0 | 17 |
| Rams | 3 | 7 | 0 | 3 | 13 |

| Statistics | USU | CSU |
|---|---|---|
| First downs | 24 | 14 |
| Total yards | 390 | 262 |
| Rushing yards | 252 | 99 |
| Passing yards | 138 | 163 |
| Turnovers | 2 | 1 |
| Time of possession | 29:30 | 30:30 |

| Team | Category | Player | Statistics |
|---|---|---|---|
| Utah State | Passing | Cooper Legas | 9/12, 85 yards, TD, INT |
| Utah State | Rushing | Calvin Tyler Jr. | 24 carries, 129 yards |
| Utah State | Receiving | Justin McGriff | 4 receptions, 63 yards, TD |
| Colorado State | Passing | Giles Pooler | 11/32, 144 yards, INT |
| Colorado State | Rushing | Avery Morrow | 27 carries, 116 yards, TD |
| Colorado State | Receiving | Louis Brown IV | 4 receptions, 52 yards |

=== Hawaii ===
| | 1 | 2 | 3 | 4 | Total |
|---|---|---|---|---|---|
| Rainbow Warriors | 3 | 10 | 0 | 0 | 13 |
| Rams | 0 | 3 | 7 | 7 | 17 |

| Statistics | HAW | CSU |
|---|---|---|
| First downs | 15 | 19 |
| Total yards | 257 | 386 |
| Rushing yards | 84 | 209 |
| Passing yards | 173 | 177 |
| Turnovers | 1 | 0 |
| Time of possession | 24:15 | 35:45 |

| Team | Category | Player | Statistics |
|---|---|---|---|
| Hawaii | Passing | Brayden Schager | 18/30, 173 yards, TD, INT |
| Hawaii | Rushing | Dedrick Parson | 15 carries, 71 yards |
| Hawaii | Receiving | Zion Bowens | 2 receptions, 38 yards |
| Colorado State | Passing | Clay Millen | 17/24, 177 yards |
| Colorado State | Rushing | Avery Morrow | 26 carries, 147 yards, 2 TD |
| Colorado State | Receiving | Justus Ross-Simmons | 4 receptions, 64 yards |

=== At Boise State ===
| | 1 | 2 | 3 | 4 | Total |
|---|---|---|---|---|---|
| Rams | 3 | 7 | 0 | 0 | 10 |
| Broncos | 14 | 14 | 21 | 0 | 49 |

| Statistics | CSU | BOIS |
|---|---|---|
| First downs | 6 | 30 |
| Total yards | 170 | 514 |
| Rushing yards | 3 | 209 |
| Passing yards | 167 | 305 |
| Turnovers | 1 | 1 |
| Time of possession | 22:25 | 37:35 |

| Team | Category | Player | Statistics |
|---|---|---|---|
| Colorado State | Passing | Clay Millen | 13/20, 161 yards, TD |
| Colorado State | Rushing | Keegan Holles | 4 carries, 21 yards |
| Colorado State | Receiving | Justus Ross-Simmons | 1 reception, 76 yards, TD |
| Boise State | Passing | Taylen Green | 24/30, 305 yards, 2 TD |
| Boise State | Rushing | George Holani | 21 carries, 108 yards, 3 TD |
| Boise State | Receiving | Stefan Cobbs | 4 receptions, 91 yards |

=== At San Jose State ===
| | 1 | 2 | 3 | 4 | Total |
|---|---|---|---|---|---|
| Rams | 7 | 3 | 0 | 6 | 16 |
| Spartans | 0 | 7 | 7 | 14 | 28 |

| Statistics | CSU | SJSU |
|---|---|---|
| First downs | 23 | 20 |
| Total yards | 468 | 355 |
| Rushing yards | 135 | 81 |
| Passing yards | 333 | 274 |
| Turnovers | 2 | 1 |
| Time of possession | 33:22 | 26:38 |

| Team | Category | Player | Statistics |
|---|---|---|---|
| Colorado State | Passing | Clay Millen | 15/24, 261 yards, INT |
| Colorado State | Rushing | Avery Morrow | 17 carries, 124 yards, TD |
| Colorado State | Receiving | Tory Horton | 9 receptions, 196 yards, TD |
| San Jose State | Passing | Chevan Cordeiro | 27/42, 274 yards, 2 TD, INT |
| San Jose State | Rushing | Kairee Robinson | 12 carries, 64 yards, 2 TD |
| San Jose State | Receiving | Elijah Cooks | 6 receptions, 80 yards, TD |

=== Wyoming ===
| | 1 | 2 | 3 | 4 | Total |
|---|---|---|---|---|---|
| Cowboys | 0 | 7 | 0 | 7 | 14 |
| Rams | 7 | 3 | 0 | 3 | 13 |

| Statistics | WYO | CSU |
|---|---|---|
| First downs | 12 | 18 |
| Total yards | 236 | 372 |
| Rushing yards | 142 | 121 |
| Passing yards | 94 | 251 |
| Turnovers | 1 | 2 |
| Time of possession | 29:19 | 30:41 |

| Team | Category | Player | Statistics |
|---|---|---|---|
| Wyoming | Passing | Jayden Clemons | 7/11, 90 yards, TD |
| Wyoming | Rushing | Titus Swen | 16 carries, 73 yards |
| Wyoming | Receiving | Alex Brown | 1 reception, 32 yards, TD |
| Colorado State | Passing | Clay Millen | 18/26, 251 yards, INT |
| Colorado State | Rushing | Avery Morrow | 22 carries, 104 yards |
| Colorado State | Receiving | Tory Horton | 8 receptions, 168 yards |

=== At Air Force ===
| | 1 | 2 | 3 | 4 | Total |
|---|---|---|---|---|---|
| Rams | 0 | 0 | 6 | 6 | 12 |
| Falcons | 7 | 10 | 7 | 0 | 24 |

| Statistics | CSU | AF |
|---|---|---|
| First downs | 15 | 22 |
| Total yards | 244 | 359 |
| Rushing yards | 65 | 359 |
| Passing yards | 179 | 0 |
| Turnovers | 0 | 1 |
| Time of possession | 22:31 | 37:29 |

| Team | Category | Player | Statistics |
|---|---|---|---|
| Colorado State | Passing | Clay Millen | 19/24, 179 yards, 2 TD |
| Colorado State | Rushing | Avery Morrow | 8 carries, 42 yards |
| Colorado State | Receiving | Jaylen Thomas | 6 receptions, 49 yards |
| Air Force | Passing | Haaziq Daniels | 0/2, 0 yards |
| Air Force | Rushing | Brad Roberts | 37 carries, 184 yards, TD |
| Air Force | Receiving | | |

=== New Mexico ===
| | 1 | 2 | 3 | 4 | Total |
|---|---|---|---|---|---|
| Lobos | 0 | 0 | 0 | 0 | 0 |
| Rams | 0 | 7 | 3 | 7 | 17 |

| Statistics | UNM | CSU |
|---|---|---|
| First downs | 9 | 14 |
| Total yards | 133 | 305 |
| Rushing yards | 71 | 75 |
| Passing yards | 62 | 230 |
| Turnovers | 1 | 1 |
| Time of possession | 26:34 | 33:26 |

| Team | Category | Player | Statistics |
|---|---|---|---|
| New Mexico | Passing | C. J. Montes | 12/27, 62 yards |
| New Mexico | Rushing | Christian Washington | 18 rushes, 88 yards |
| New Mexico | Receiving | Elijah Queen | 3 receptions, 22 yards |
| Colorado State | Passing | Clay Millen | 19/24, 214 yards, 2 TD |
| Colorado State | Rushing | Avery Morrow | 22 rushes, 62 yards |
| Colorado State | Receiving | Tory Horton | 10 receptions, 131 yards, TD |
