= 2019 San Jose State Spartans football team =

American college football season

2019 San Jose State Spartans football
- Conference: Mountain West Conference
- West Division
- Record: 5–7 (2–6 MW)
- Head coach: Brent Brennan (3rd season)
- Offensive coordinator: Kevin McGiven (2nd season)
- Offensive scheme: Spread option
- Defensive coordinator: Derrick Odum (3rd season)
- Base defense: 3–4
- Home stadium: CEFCU Stadium

Uniform
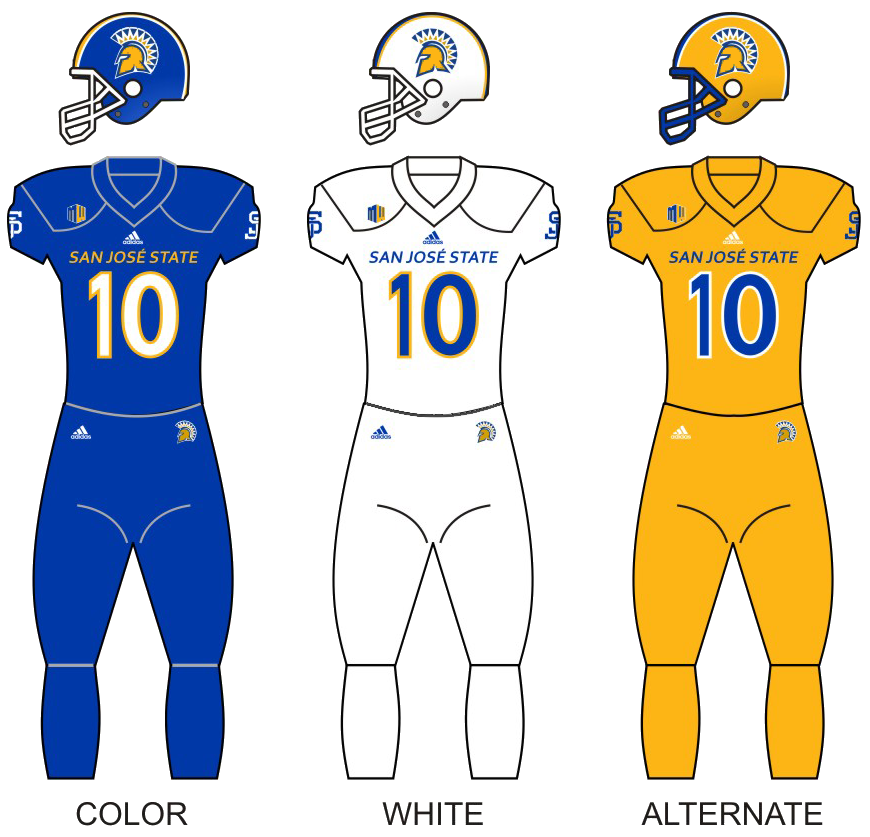

2019 Mountain West Conference football standings
	Conf.			Overall
Team	W		L	W		L
Mountain Division
No. 23 Boise State xy$	8	–	0	12	–	2
No. 22 Air Force	7	–	1	11	–	2
Utah State	6	–	2	7	–	6
Wyoming	4	–	4	8	–	5
Colorado State	3	–	5	4	–	8
New Mexico	0	–	8	2	–	10
West Division
Hawaii xy	5	–	3	10	–	5
San Diego State x	5	–	3	10	–	3
Nevada	4	–	4	7	–	6
San Jose State	2	–	6	5	–	7
UNLV	2	–	6	4	–	8
Fresno State	2	–	6	4	–	8
Championship: Boise State 31, Hawaii 10
$ – Conference champion; x – Division champion/co-champions; y – Championship game participant; Rankings from AP Poll

The 2019 San Jose State Spartans football team represented San Jose State University in the 2019 NCAA Division I FBS football season. The Spartans were led by third year coach Brent Brennan and played their home games at CEFCU Stadium. San Jose State was a member of the Mountain West Conference in the West Division. They finished the season 5–7, 2–6 in Mountain West play to finish in a three-way tie for fourth place in the West Division.

On June 5, 2019, San Jose State broke ground on its new Football Operations Building. The first phase of the project involved replacing the bleachers on the east side of the stadium with grass, which reduced the seating capacity by 8,936. It will be demolished and rebuilt along with the new Football Operations Building by 2023.

On September 21, 2019, San Jose State beat Arkansas for its first win over a Power 5 opponent since 2006. This was also San Jose State's first ever win over an opponent from the Southeastern Conference.

== Preseason ==
=== Mountain West media days ===
The Mountain West media days were held from July 23–24, 2019 at Green Valley Ranch in Henderson, NV.

==== Media poll ====
The preseason poll was released at the Mountain West media days on July 23, 2019. The Spartans were predicted to finish in sixth place in the MW West Division.

==== Preseason All−Mountain West Team ====
The Spartans did not have any selections to the preseason All−Mountain West Team.

== Personnel ==
=== Coaching staff ===
Name	Position	Seasons at San Jose State	Alma mater
Brent Brennan	Head coach	3rd as HC; 9th overall	UCLA (1996)
Kevin McGiven	Offensive coordinator	2nd	Utah Valley (2001)
Derrick Odum	Defensive coordinator	3rd	Utah (1993)
Joe Bernardi	Offensive line/RGC	3rd	Fresno State (2010)
Alonzo Carter	Running backs/RC	3rd	Cal State East Bay
Kevin Cummings	Wide receivers	3rd	Oregon State (2014)
Fred Guidici	Special teams	3rd	San Jose State (1989)
Ryan Gunderson	Quarterbacks/PGC	3rd	Oregon State (2007)
Joe Seumalo	Defensive line	3rd	Hawaii (1988)
Scott White	Linebackers	3rd	Washington (2006)
Aric Williams	Defensive backs	2nd	Oregon State (2005)
Terry Malley	Analyst	1st	Santa Clara (1976)

== Schedule ==
Date	Time	Opponent	Site	TV	Result	Attendance
August 29	7:00 p.m.	Northern Colorado*	CEFCU Stadium; San Jose, CA		W 35–18	13,480
September 7	6:00 p.m.	Tulsa*	CEFCU Stadium; San Jose, CA	ESPN3	L 16–34	12,471
September 21	4:30 p.m.	at Arkansas*	Donald W. Reynolds Razorback Stadium; Fayetteville, AR	SECN	W 31–24	56,058
September 27	5:00 p.m.	at Air Force	Falcon Stadium; Colorado Springs, CO	CBSSN	L 24–41	24,768
October 4	7:00 p.m.	New Mexico	CEFCU Stadium; San Jose, CA	CBSSN	W 32–21	16,119
October 12	1:00 p.m.	at Nevada	Mackay Stadium; Reno, NV	AT&T RM	L 38–41	15,311
October 19	4:00 p.m.	San Diego State^{†}	CEFCU Stadium; San Jose, CA	Stadium on Facebook	L 17–27	18,285
October 26	9:00 a.m.	at Army*	Michie Stadium; West Point, NY	CBSSN	W 34–29	35,346
November 2	7:30 p.m.	No. 21 Boise State	CEFCU Stadium; San Jose, CA	CBSSN	L 42–52	19,184
November 9	8:00 p.m.	at Hawaii	Aloha Stadium; Halawa, HI (Dick Tomey Legacy Game)	SPEC HI	L 40–42	19,858
November 23	1:00 p.m.	at UNLV	Sam Boyd Stadium; Whitney, NV	AT&TSN	L 35–38	17,373
November 30	7:30 p.m.	Fresno State	CEFCU Stadium; San Jose, CA (rivalry)	ESPN2	W 17–16	12,835
*Non-conference game; ^{†}Homecoming; Rankings from AP Poll and College Football Playoff Rankings after November 5 released prior to game; All times are in Pacific time

== Game summaries ==
=== Northern Colorado ===
Northern Colorado Bears at San Jose State Spartans

Quarter	1	2	3	4	Total
Bears	3	3	9	3	18
Spartans	14	7	7	7	35

at CEFCU Stadium, San Jose, CA

- Date: August 29, 2019
- Game time: 7:00 p.m. PDT
- Game weather: Temperature: 75 °F (24 °C) • Wind: NW 14 mph • Weather: Sunny, Clear
- Game attendance: 13,480
- Referee: Stephen Baron
- ESPN – Love leads San Jose State to 35–18 win in opener /// Box Score, Northern Colorado at San Jose State /// Pregame Notes /// Postgame Notes

Game information

First Quarter

- (10:09) SJSU TD – DeJon Packer 1-yard rush, Matt Mercurio kick
  Drive: 11 plays, 75 yards, 4:51; San Jose State 7–0
- (07:41) NC FG – Collin Root 52-yard field goal
  Drive: 7 plays, 30 yards, 2:20; San Jose State 7–3
- (03:51) SJSU TD – Jermaine Braddock 7-yard pass from Josh Love, Matt Mercurio kick
  Drive: 11 plays, 75 yards, 3:50; San Jose State 14–3

Second Quarter

- (14:45) NC FG – Collin Root 36-yard field goal
  Drive: 11 plays, 40 yards, 4:00; San Jose State 14–6
- (07:33) SJSU TD – Josh Love 3-yard rush, Matt Mercurio kick
  Drive: 6 plays, 40 yards, 1:48; San Jose State 21–6

Third Quarter

- (07:56) NC TD – Dontay Warren 7-yard pass from Jacob Knipp, Collin Root kick
  Drive: 16 plays, 75 yards, 7:04; San Jose State 21–13
- (06:05) SJSU TD – Derrick Deese Jr. 14-yard pass from Josh Love, Matt Mercurio kick
  Drive: 6 plays, 65 yards, 1:44; San Jose State 28–13
- (03:05) NC SF – Isaiah Iton safety
  Drive: 0 plays, 0 yards, 0:00; San Jose State 28–15

Fourth Quarter

- (13:30) NC FG – Collin Root 36-yard field goal
  Drive: 9 plays, 51 yards, 4:25; San Jose State 28–18
- (05:21) SJSU TD – Tyler Nevens 8-yard rush, Matt Mercurio kick
  Drive: 2 plays, 13 yards, 0:45; San Jose State 35–18

Passing

- NC – Jacob Knipp: 26/44, 177 yards, 1 TD, 2 INT
- SJSU – Josh Love: 21/31, 224 yards, 2 TD

Rushing

- NC – Milo Hall: 20 carries, 77 yards
- SJSU – Nick Nash: 5 carries, 67 yards

Receiving

- NC – Willie Fairman: 10 receptions, 53 yards
- SJSU – Isaiah Hamilton: 5 receptions, 91 yards

Win Probability

- SJSU – 96.1%

=== Tulsa ===
Tulsa Golden Hurricane at San Jose State Spartans

Quarter	1	2	3	4	Total
Golden Hurricane	7	10	3	14	34
Spartans	3	7	0	6	16

at CEFCU Stadium, San Jose, CA

- Date: September 7, 2019
- Game time: 6:00 p.m. PDT
- Game weather: Temperature: 70 °F (21 °C) • Wind: WNW 13 mph • Weather: Overcast
- Game attendance: 12,471
- Referee: Charles Lamertina
- TV announcers (ESPN3): Trey Bender (Play-by-play) & Al Groh (analyst)
- ESPN – Tulsa runs all over San Jose State in 34–16 win /// Box Score, Tulsa at San Jose State /// Pregame Notes /// Postgame Notes

Game information

First Quarter

- (07:48) TLS TD – Shamari Brooks 9-yard rush, Jacob Rainey kick
  Drive: 14 plays, 75 yards, 7:12; Tulsa 7–0
- (03:59) SJSU FG – Matt Mercurio 22-yard field goal
  Drive: 11 plays, 74 yards, 3:44; Tulsa 7–3

Second Quarter

- (14:53) TLS TD – Denzel Carter 8-yard pass from Zach Smith, Jacob Rainey kick
  Drive: 11 plays, 75 yards, 4:06; Tulsa 14–3
- (06:31) SJSU TD – Jermaine Braddock 22-yard pass from Josh Love, Matt Mercurio kick
  Drive: 9 plays, 80 yards, 3:00; Tulsa 14–10
- (02:50) TLS FG – Jacob Rainey 27-yard field goal
  Drive: 13 plays, 57 yards, 3:41; Tulsa 17–10

Third Quarter

- (03:03) TLS FG – Jacob Rainey 28-yard field goal
  Drive: 12 plays, 70 yards, 5:20; Tulsa 20–10

Fourth Quarter

- (13:21) TLS TD – T.K. Wilkerson 3-yard rush, Jacob Rainey kick
  Drive: 9 plays, 80 yards, 3:21; Tulsa 27–10
- (10:12) TLS TD – T.K. Wilkerson 17-yard rush, Jacob Rainey kick
  Drive: 7 plays, 92 yards, 2:21; Tulsa 34–10
- (02:37) SJSU TD – Nick Nash 20-yard rush, Nick Nash pass failed
  Drive: 16 plays, 74 yards, 7:26; Tulsa 34–16

Passing

- TLS – Zach Smith 21/28, 283 yards, 1 TD
- SJSU – Josh Love: 16/30, 189 yards, 1 TD

Rushing

- TLS – Shamari Brooks: 29 carries, 140 yards, 1 TD
- SJSU – DeJon Packer: 12 carries, 53 yards

Receiving

- TLS – Sam Crawford Jr.: 9 receptions, 137 yards
- SJSU – Bailey Gaither: 5 receptions, 68 yards

Win Probability

- TLS – 65.5%

Line

- TLS – -6.0

Over/Under

- TLS – 54

=== At Arkansas ===
San Jose State Spartans at Arkansas Razorbacks

Quarter	1	2	3	4	Total
Spartans	7	17	0	7	31
Razorbacks	7	0	3	14	24

at Donald W. Reynolds Razorback Stadium, Fayetteville, AR

- Date: September 21, 2019
- Game time: 6:30 p.m. CDT
- Game weather: Temperature: 81 °F (27 °C) • Wind: S 11 mph • Weather: Partly Cloudy
- Game attendance: 56,058
- Referee: Hubert Owens
- TV announcers (SECN): Dave Neal (Play-by-play), D. J. Shockley (analyst) & Dawn Davenport (sideline)
- ESPN – San Jose State upsets Arkansas with late score /// Box Score, San Jose State at Arkansas /// Pregame Notes /// Postgame Notes

Game information

First Quarter

- (12:44) SJSU TD – Jaquan Blackwell 3-yard pass from Josh Love, Matt Mercurio kick
  Drive: 7 plays, 75 yards, 2:16; San Jose State 7–0
- (01:07) ARK TD – Mike Woods 62-yard pass from Nick Starkel, Connor Limpert kick
  Drive: 4 plays, 72 yards, 1:18; Tied 7–7

Second Quarter

- (14:18) SJSU TD – Nick Nash 15-yard rush, Matt Mercurio kick
  Drive: 2 plays, 28 yards, 0:27; San Jose State 14–7
- (06:09) SJSU FG – Matt Mercurio 47-yard field goal
  Drive: 7 plays, 47 yards, 2:12; San Jose State 17–7
- (01:06) SJSU TD – Isaiah Holiness 26-yard pass from Josh Love, Matt Mercurio kick
  Drive: 9 plays, 79 yards, 3:48; San Jose State 24–7

Third Quarter

- (05:01) ARK FG – Connor Limpert 48-yard field goal
  Drive: 6 plays, 26 yards, 2:00; San Jose State 24–10

Fourth Quarter

- (13:10) ARK TD – Tyson Morris 30-yard pass from Nick Starkel, Connor Limpert kick
  Drive: 9 plays, 80 yards, 3:09; San Jose State 24–17
- (02:56) ARK TD – Trey Knox 8-yard pass from Nick Starkel, Connor Limpert kick
  Drive: 7 plays, 80 yards, 2:55; Tied 24–24
- (01:13) SJSU TD – DeJon Packer 19-yard rush, Matt Mercurio kick
  Drive: 5 plays, 75 yards, 1:43; San Jose State 31–24

Passing

- SJSU – Josh Love: 32/49, 402 yards, 2 TD, 1 INT
- ARK – Nick Starkel: 28/50, 356 yards, 3 TD, 5 INT

Rushing

- SJSU – DeJon Packer: 8 carries, 40 yards, 1 TD
- ARK – Rakeem Boyd: 18 carries, 91 yards

Receiving

- SJSU – Tre Walker: 12 receptions, 161 yards
- ARK – Michael Woods II: 4 receptions, 115 yards, 1 TD

Win Probability

- ARK – 80.8%

Line

- ARK – -19.5

Over/Under

- 62

=== At Air Force ===
San Jose State Spartans at Air Force Falcons

Quarter	1	2	3	4	Total
Spartans	7	3	0	14	24
Falcons	7	14	13	7	41

at Falcon Stadium, Colorado Springs, CO

- Date: September 27, 2019
- Game time: 6:00 p.m. MDT
- Game weather: Temperature: 65 °F (18 °C) • Weather: Cloudy
- Game attendance: 24,786
- Referee: Kevin Hassell
- TV announcers (CBSSN): John Sadak (Play-by-play) & Randy Cross (analyst)
- ESPN – Hammond leads Air Force over San Jose State 41–24 /// Box Score, San Jose State at Air Force /// Pregame Notes /// Postgame Notes

Game information

First Quarter

- (10:50) SJSU TD – DeJon Packer 1-yard rush, Matt Mercurio kick
  Drive: 10 plays, 75 yards, 4:10; San Jose State 7–0
- (04:57) AFA TD – Timothy Jackson 7-yard rush, Jake Koehnke kick
  Drive: 13 plays, 75 yards, 5:53; Tied 7–7

Second Quarter

- (08:43) AFA TD – Geraud Sanders 64-yard pass from Donald Hammond III, Jake Koehnke kick
  Drive: 5 plays, 75 yards, 1:45; Air Force 14–7
- (03:13) AFA TD – Taven Birdow 1-yard rush, Jake Koehnke kick
  Drive: 9 plays, 37 yards, 3:59; Air Force 21–7
- (00:48) SJSU FG – Matt Mercurio 25-yard field goal
  Drive: 9 plays, 67 yards, 2:25; Air Force 21–10

Third Quarter

- (12:05) AFA TD – Christian Mallard 3-yard rush, Jake Koehnke kick blocked
  Drive: 8 plays, 75 yards, 2:55; Air Force 27–10
- (10:10) AFA TD – Christian Mallard 7-yard rush, Jake Koehnke kick
  Drive: 6 plays, 20 yards, 1:53; Air Force 34–10

Fourth Quarter

- (07:48) AFA TD – Taven Birdow 3-yard rush, Jake Koehnke kick
  Drive: 16 plays, 88 yards, 9:19; Air Force 41–10
- (03:51) SJSU TD – Andre Crump 30-yard pass from Nick Nash, Matt Mercurio kick
  Drive: 8 plays, 75 yards, 3:57; Air Force 41–17
- (00:52) SJSU TD – Derrick Deese Jr. 6-yard pass from Nick Nash, Matt Mercurio kick
  Drive: 4 plays, 22 yards, 0:43; Air Force 41–24

Passing

- SJSU – Josh Love: 19/35, 198 yards
- AFA – Donald Hammond III: 5/9, 131 yards, 1 TD

Rushing

- SJSU – Nick Nash: 11 carries, 62 yards
- AFA – Taven Birdow: 25 carries, 124 yards, 2 TD

Receiving

- SJSU – Tre Walker: 6 receptions, 69 yards
- AFA – Geraud Sanders: 3 receptions, 108 yards, 1 TD

Win Probability

- AFA – 83.3%

Line

- AFA – -19.5

Over/Under

- 58

=== New Mexico ===
New Mexico Lobos at San Jose State Spartans

Quarter	1	2	3	4	Total
Lobos	0	7	7	7	21
Spartans	6	20	0	6	32

at CEFCU Stadium, San Jose, CA

- Date: October 4, 2019
- Game time: 7:00 p.m. PDT
- Game weather: Temperature: 62 °F (17 °C) • Wind: NNW 14 mph • Weather: Clear
- Game attendance: 16,119
- Referee: Scott Campbell
- TV announcers (CBSSN): Jason Horowitz (Play-by-play) & Malik Zaire (analyst)
- ESPN – Love passes for 405 yards, San Jose State beats New Mexico /// Box Score, New Mexico at San Jose State /// Pregame Notes /// Postgame Notes

Game information

First Quarter

- (06:50) SJSU TD – Nick Nash 9-yard rush, Matt Mercurio kick blocked
  Drive: 6 plays, 80 yards, 2:28; San Jose State 6–0

Second Quarter

- (12:56) SJSU TD – Billy Humphreys 5-yard pass from Josh Love, Matt Mercurio kick
  Drive: 7 plays, 93 yards, 2:04; San Jose State 13–0
- (08:42) SJSU TD – Bailey Gaither 80-yard pass from Josh Love, Matt Mercurio kick
  Drive: 1 play, 80 yards, 0:12; San Jose State 20–0
- (06:57) SJSU FG – Matt Mercurio 24-yard field goal
  Drive: 4 plays, -5 yards, 1:28; San Jose State 23–0
- (04:22) SJSU FG – Matt Mercurio 33-yard field goal
  Drive: 4 plays, 9 yards, 1:48; San Jose State 26–0
- (01:12) NM TD – Jordan Kress 34-yard pass from Sheriron Jones, Andrew Shelley kick
  Drive: 6 plays, 75 yards, 3:08; San Jose State 26–7

Third Quarter

- (03:11) NM TD – Sheriron Jones 4-yard rush, Andrew Shelley kick
  Drive: 4 plays, 60 yards, 1:22; San Jose State 26–14

Fourth Quarter

- (12:47) SJSU FG – Matt Mercurio 49-yard field goal
  Drive: 6 plays, 33 yards, 2:04; San Jose State 29–14
- (06:16) SJSU FG – Matt Mercurio 24-yard field goal
  Drive: 11 plays, 52 yards, 5:57; San Jose State 32–14
- (04:52) NM TD – Cedric Patterson III 38-yard pass from Sheriron Jones, Andrew Shelley kick
  Drive: 3 plays, 66 yards, 1:18; San Jose State 32–21

Passing

- NM – Sheriron Jones: 7/16, 127 yards, 2 TD, 3 INT
- SJSU – Josh Love: 24/36, 405 yards, 2 TD

Rushing

- NM – Sheriron Jones: 11 carries, 104 yards, 1 TD
- SJSU – Nick Nash: 9 carries, 29 yards, 1 TD

Receiving

- NM – Jordan Kress: 2 receptions, 46 yards, 1 TD
- SJSU – Tre Walker: 7 receptions, 130 yards

Win Probability

- SJSU – 63.4%

Line

- SJSU – -7.0

Over/Under

- 70

=== At Nevada ===
San Jose State Spartans at Nevada Wolf Pack

Quarter	1	2	3	4	Total
Spartans	3	7	14	14	38
Wolf Pack	14	10	7	10	41

at Mackay Stadium, Reno, NV

- Date: October 12, 2019
- Game time: 1:00 p.m. PDT
- Game weather: Temperature: 58 °F (14 °C) • Wind: S 2 mph • Weather: Sunny and Clear
- Game attendance: 15,311
- Referee: Cal McNeill
- TV announcers (AT&T RM): Drew Goodman (Play-by-play), Sed Bonner (analyst) & Brad Thompson (sideline)
- ESPN – Talton kicks 40-yard FG, Nevada beats San Jose State 41–38 /// Box Score, San Jose State at Nevada /// Pregame Notes /// Postgame Notes

Game information

First Quarter

- (10:17) NEV TD – Devonte Lee 2-yard rush, Brandon Talton kick
  Drive: 6 plays, 66 yards, 2:41; Nevada 7–0
- (09:34) NEV TD – Austin Arnold 40-yard interception return, Brandon Talton kick
  Drive: 0 plays, 0 yards, 0:00; Nevada 14–0
- (07:10) SJSU FG – Matt Mercurio 44-yard field goal
  Drive: 6 plays, 48 yards, 2:24; Nevada 14–3

Second Quarter

- (14:00) NEV TD – Devonte Lee 1-yard rush, Brandon Talton kick
  Drive: 11 plays, 77 yards, 4:23; Nevada 21–3
- (05:12) NEV FG – Brandon Talton 25-yard field goal
  Drive: 14 plays, 37 yards, 6:15; Nevada 24–3
- (00:27) SJSU TD – Isaiah Hamilton 37-yard pass from Josh Love, Matt Mercurio kick
  Drive: 3 plays, 61 yards, 0:17; Nevada 24–10

Third Quarter

- (14:52) NEV TD – Romeo Doubs 75-yard pass from Malik Henry, Brandon Talton kick
  Drive: 1 play, 75 yards, 0:08; Nevada 31–10
- (14:17) SJSU TD – Bailey Gaither 60-yard pass from Josh Love, Matt Mercurio kick
  Drive: 2 plays, 75 yards, 0:35; Nevada 31–17
- (06:09) SJSU TD – DeJon Packer 1-yard rush, Matt Mercurio kick
  Drive: 5 plays, 29 yards, 1:31; Nevada 31–24

Fourth Quarter

- (08:20) SJSU TD – Tre Walker 20-yard pass from Josh Love, Matt Mercurio kick
  Drive: 10 plays, 80 yards, 3:42; Tied 31–31
- (03:53) NEV TD – Toa Taua 1-yard rush, Brandon Talton kick
  Drive: 11 plays, 75 yards, 4:27; Nevada 38–31
- (02:36) SJSU TD – DeJon Packer 2-yard rush, Matt Mercurio kick
  Drive: 7 plays, 68 yards, 1:11; Tied 38–38
- (00:00) NEV FG – Brandon Talton 40-yard field goal
  Drive: 7 plays, 46 yards, 2:30; Nevada 41–38

Passing

- SJSU – Josh Love: 23/45, 405 yards, 3 TD, 1 INT
- NEV – Malik Henry: 22/37, 352 yards, 1 TD, 2 INT

Rushing

- SJSU – Nick Nash: 3 carries, 23 yards
- NEV – Toa Taua: 34 carries, 160 yards, 1 TD

Receiving

- SJSU – Bailey Gaither: 5 receptions, 131 yards, 1 TD
- NEV – Romeo Doubs: 5 receptions, 146 yards, 1 TD

Win Probability

- SJSU – 54.4%

Line

- NEV – -3.0

Over/Under

- 61

=== San Diego State ===
San Diego State Aztecs at San Jose State Spartans

Quarter	1	2	3	4	Total
Aztecs	7	6	14	0	27
Spartans	7	0	3	7	17

at CEFCU Stadium, San Jose, CA

- Date: October 19, 2019
- Game time: 4:00 p.m. PDT
- Game weather: Temperature: 70 °F (21 °C) • Wind: N 13 mph • Weather: Partly Cloudy
- Game attendance: 18,285
- Referee: Mike Cuttone
- TV announcers (Stadium Facebook): Ari Wolfe (Play-by-play), Jordan Palmer (analyst) & Dani Klupenger (sideline)
- ESPN – Washington, San Diego St. beat San Jose St. 27–17 /// Box Score, San Diego State at San Jose State /// Pregame Notes /// Postgame Notes

Game information

First Quarter

- (14:46) SDSU TD – Kaegun Williams 95-yard kickoff return, Matt Araiza kick
  Drive: 0 plays, 0 yards, 0:00; San Diego State 7–0
- (13:11) SJSU TD – Kairee Robinson 15-yard pass from Josh Love, Matt Mercurio kick
  Drive: 4 plays, 66 yards, 1:30; Tied 7–7

Second Quarter

- (14:33) SDSU FG – Matt Araiza 41-yard field goal
  Drive: 6 plays, 18 yards, 2:26; San Diego State 10–7
- (00:06) SDSU FG – Matt Araiza 27-yard field goal
  Drive: 20 plays, 77 yards, 10:04; San Diego State 13–7

Third Quarter

- (10:18) SJSU FG – Matt Mercurio 25-yard field goal
  Drive: 14 plays, 68 yards, 4:42; San Diego State 13–10
- (04:05) SDSU TD – Juwan Washington 1-yard rush, Matt Araiza kick
  Drive: 11 plays, 57 yards, 6:12; San Diego State 20–10
- (00:26) SDSU TD – Chase Jasmin 50-yard rush, Matt Araiza kick
  Drive: 6 plays, 68 yards, 3:04; San Diego State 27–10

Fourth Quarter

- (04:59) SJSU TD – Bailey Gaither 8-yard pass from Josh Love, Matt Mercurio kick
  Drive: 11 plays, 99 yards, 4:10; San Diego State 27–17

Passing

- SDSU – Ryan Agnew: 13/20, 88 yards
- SJSU – Josh Love: 19/36, 218 yards, 2 TD, 1 INT

Rushing

- SDSU – Juwan Washington: 16 carries, 78 yards, 1 TD
- SJSU – Kairee Robinson: 14 carries, 59 yards

Receiving

- SDSU – Kobe Smith: 4 receptions, 29 yards
- SJSU – Bailey Gaither: 4 receptions, 75 yards, 1 TD

Win Probability

- SDSU – 83.6%

Line

- SDSU – -7.0

Over/Under

- 46

=== At Army ===
San Jose State Spartans at Army Black Knights

Quarter	1	2	3	4	Total
Spartans	7	16	0	11	34
Black Knights	7	3	7	12	29

at Michie Stadium, West Point, NY

- Date: October 26, 2019
- Game time: 12:00 p.m. EDT
- Game attendance: 35,346
- Referee: Marcus Woods
- TV announcers (CBSSN): Ben Holden (play-by-play), Ross Tucker (analyst) & Tina Cervasio (sideline)
- ESPN – San Jose State beats Army 34–29 at Michie Stadium /// Box Score, San Jose State at Army /// Pregame Notes /// Postgame Notes

Game information

- (11:44) SJSU TD – Isaiah Hamilton 19-yard pass from Josh Love, Matt Mercurio kick
  Drive: 8 plays, 77 yards, 3:16; San Jose State 7–0
- (01:59) ARMY TD – Cam Harrison 31-yard pass from Kelvin Hopkins Jr., Cole Talley kick
  Drive: 15 plays, 87 yards, 9:45; Tied 7–7

Second Quarter

- (14:42) SJSU FG – Matt Mercurio 30-yard field goal
  Drive: 8 plays, 68 yards, 2:09; San Jose State 10–7
- (11:36) SJSU TD – Kairee Robinson 18-yard pass from Josh Love, Matt Mercurio kick
  Drive: 4 plays, 44 yards, 1:43; San Jose State 17–7
- (05:37) SJSU FG – Matt Mercurio 23-yard field goal
  Drive: 5 plays, 42 yards, 2:01; San Jose State 20–7
- (00:52) ARMY FG – Cole Talley 41-yard field goal
  Drive: 14 plays, 51 yards, 4:45; San Jose State 20–10
- (00:02) SJSU FG – Matt Mercurio 38-yard field goal
  Drive: 4 plays, 18 yards, 0:38; San Jose State 23–10

Third Quarter

- (08:09) ARMY TD – Sandon McCoy 4-yard rush, Cole Talley kick
  Drive: 13 plays, 75 yards, 6:51; San Jose State 23–17

Fourth Quarter

- (14:53) SJSU TD – Bailey Gaither 21-yard pass from Josh Love, Tre Walker pass
  Drive: 6 plays, 55 yards, 2:49; San Jose State 31–17
- (08:42) ARMY TD – Christian Anderson 1-yard rush, TEAM rush fumbled
  Drive: 13 plays, 69 yards, 6:05; San Jose State 31–23
- (03:48) SJSU FG – Matt Mercurio 28-yard field goal
  Drive: 9 plays, 65 yards, 4:54; San Jose State 34–23
- (00:31) ARMY TD – Christian Anderson 33-yard rush, Christian Anderson pass failed
  Drive: 8 plays, 71 yards, 1:13; San Jose State 34–29

Passing

- SJSU – Josh Love: 20/31, 314 yards, 3 TD
- ARMY – Kelvin Hopkins Jr.: 2/3, 50 yards, 1 TD

Rushing

- SJSU – DeJon Packer: 9 carries, 63 yards
- ARMY – Christian Anderson: 16 carries, 87 yards, 2 TD

Receiving

- SJSU – Tre Walker: 6 receptions, 94 yards
- ARMY – Cam Harrison: 4 receptions, 54 yards, 1 TD

Win Probability

- ARMY – 76.9%

Line

- ARMY – -9.5

Over/Under

- 54

=== Boise State ===
No. 21 Boise State Broncos at San Jose State Spartans

Quarter	1	2	3	4	Total
No. 21 Broncos	7	10	14	21	52
Spartans	14	10	10	8	42

at CEFCU Stadium, San Jose, CA

- Date: November 2, 2019
- Game time: 7:30 p.m. PDT
- Game weather: Temperature: 65 °F (18 °C) • Wind: W 3 mph • Weather: Fair
- Game attendance: 19,184
- Referee: Cal McNeill
- TV announcers (CBSSN): Carter Blackburn (play-by-play), Aaron Taylor (analyst) & Jenny Dell (sideline)
- ESPN – Holani's 4 TDs lead No. 21 Boise St. past San Jose St. 52–42 /// Box Score, No. 21 Boise State at San Jose State /// Pregame Notes /// Postgame Notes

Game information

First Quarter

- (10:58) SJSU TD – DeJon Packer 1-yard rush, Matt Mercurio kick
  Drive: 9 plays, 82 yards, 4:02; San Jose State 7–0
- (03:26) SJSU TD – Josh Love 4-yard rush, Matt Mercurio kick
  Drive: 15 plays, 76 yards, 5:05; San Jose State 14–0
- (00:15) BSU TD – Avery Williams 66-yard punt return, Eric Sachse kick
  Drive: 0 plays, 0 yards, 0:00; San Jose State 14–7

Second Quarter

- (12:01) SJSU FG – Matt Mercurio 35-yard field goal
  Drive: 10 plays, 60 yards, 3:07; San Jose State 17–7
- (07:58) BSU TD – George Holani 1-yard rush, Eric Sachse kick
  Drive: 8 plays, 70 yards, 4:00; San Jose State 17–14
- (01:13) SJSU TD – Isaiah Hamilton 16-yard pass from Josh Love, Matt Mercurio kick
  Drive: 6 plays, 83 yards, 2:38; San Jose State 24–14
- (00:24) BSU FG – Eric Sachse 30-yard field goal
  Drive: 5 plays, 55 yards, 0:42; San Jose State 24–17

Third Quarter

- (10:27) SJSU FG – Matt Mercurio 35-yard field goal
  Drive: 7 plays, 58 yards, 2:39; San Jose State 27–17
- (09:13) BSU TD – George Holani 6-yard rush, Eric Sachse kick
  Drive: 3 plays, 45 yards, 1:05; San Jose State 27–24
- (03:28) BSU TD – Chase Cord 8-yard rush, Eric Sachse kick
  Drive: 9 plays, 63 yards, 4:58; Boise State 31–27
- (00:53) SJSU TD – DeJon Packer 3-yard rush, Matt Mercurio kick
  Drive: 6 plays, 75 yards, 2:35; San Jose State 34–31

Fourth Quarter

- (11:31) BSU TD – George Holani 6-yard rush, Eric Sachse kick
  Drive: 9 plays, 79 yards, 4:17; Boise State 38–34
- (06:24) BSU TD – Andrew Van Buren 32-yard rush, Eric Sachse kick
  Drive: 7 plays, 77 yards, 3:29; Boise State 45–34
- (03:56) SJSU TD – Bailey Gaither 9-yard pass from Josh Love, Tre Walker pass
  Drive: 9 plays, 75 yards, 2:28; Boise State 45–42
- (01:35) BSU TD – George Holani 8-yard rush, Eric Sachse kick
  Drive: 7 plays, 39 yards, 2:19; Boise State 52–42

Passing

- BSU – Hank Bachmeier: 13/17, 213 yards, 1 INT
- SJSU – Josh Love: 29/53, 438 yards, 2 TD, 1 INT

Rushing

- BSU – George Holani: 28 carries, 126 yards, 4 TD
- SJSU – Kairee Robinson: 9 carries, 41 yards

Receiving

- BSU – John Hightower: 5 receptions, 129 yards
- SJSU – Tre Walker: 9 receptions, 193 yards

=== At Hawaii ===
San Jose State Spartans at Hawaii Rainbow Warriors

Quarter	1	2	3	4	Total
Spartans	3	20	3	14	40
Rainbow Warriors	7	14	7	14	42

at Aloha Stadium, Honolulu, HI

- Date: November 9, 2019
- Game time: 6:00 p.m. HST
- Game weather: Temperature: 81 °F (27 °C) • Wind: ESE 5 mph • Weather: Partly Cloudy, Humidity 56%
- Game attendance: 19,858
- Referee: Eddy Shelton
- TV announcers (SPEC HI / Stadium): Robert Kekaula (play-by-play), Rich Miano (analyst) & Scott Robbs (sideline)
- ESPN – Cordeiro's 5 TDs help Hawaii beat San Jose St. 42–40 /// Box Score, San Jose State at Hawaii /// Pregame Notes /// Postgame Notes

Game information

First Quarter

- (09:06) SJSU FG – Matt Mercurio 28-yard field goal
  Drive: 12 plays, 64 yards, 5:54; San Jose State 3–0
- (00:27) HAW TD – JoJo Ward 5-yard pass from Chevan Cordeiro, Ryan Meskell kick
  Drive: 14 plays, 75 yards, 8:39; Hawaii 7–3

Second Quarter

- (11:15) SJSU TD – DeJon Packer 6-yard rush, Matt Mercurio kick
  Drive: 12 plays, 66 yards, 4:06; San Jose State 10–7
- (09:59) SJSU FG – Matt Mercurio 43-yard field goal
  Drive: 4 plays, -5 yards, 0:59; San Jose State 13–7
- (09:08) HAW TD – JoJo Ward 71-yard pass from Chevan Cordeiro, Ryan Meskell kick
  Drive: 2 plays, 75 yards, 0:51; Hawaii 14–13
- (06:26) SJSU TD – DeJon Packer 20-yard rush, Matt Mercurio kick
  Drive: 7 plays, 75 yards, 2:42; San Jose State 20–14
- (02:37) HAW TD – Miles Reed 4-yard rush, Ryan Meskell kick
  Drive: 8 plays, 75 yards, 3:49; Hawaii 21–20
- (00:44) SJSU FG – Matt Mercurio 43-yard field goal
  Drive: 9 plays, 49 yards, 1:53; San Jose State 23–21

Third Quarter

- (09:30) HAW TD – Chevan Cordeiro 3-yard rush, Ryan Meskell kick
  Drive: 9 plays, 87 yards, 5:23; Hawaii 28–23
- (01:21) SJSU FG – Matt Mercurio 25-yard field goal
  Drive: 16 plays, 67 yards, 8:09; Hawaii 28–26

Fourth Quarter

- (12:13) HAW TD – Jared Smart 5-yard pass from Chevan Cordeiro, Ryan Meskell kick
  Drive: 9 plays, 75 yards, 4:08; Hawaii 35–26
- (09:53) SJSU TD – Bailey Gaither 40-yard pass from Josh Love, Matt Mercurio kick
  Drive: 5 plays, 91 yards, 2:13; Hawaii 35–33
- (04:23) HAW TD – Chevan Cordeiro 2-yard rush, Ryan Meskell kick
  Drive: 12 plays, 85 yards, 5:20; Hawaii 42–33
- (01:51) SJSU TD – Isaiah Hamilton 19-yard pass from Josh Love, Matt Mercurio kick
  Drive: 10 plays, 75 yards, 2:32; Hawaii 42–40

Passing

- SJSU – Josh Love: 30/45, 375 yards, 2 TD
- HAW – Chevan Cordeiro: 23/31, 309 yards, 3 TD

Rushing

- SJSU – DeJon Packer: 20 carries, 112 yards, 2 TD
- HAW – Miles Reed: 17 carries, 124 yards, 1 TD

Receiving

- SJSU – Tre Walker: 10 receptions, 138 yards
- HAW – JoJo Ward: 7 receptions, 170 yards, 2 TD

=== At UNLV ===
San Jose State Spartans at UNLV Rebels

Quarter	1	2	3	4	Total
Spartans	6	0	22	7	35
Rebels	7	14	3	14	38

at Sam Boyd Stadium, Whitney, NV

- Date: November 23, 2019
- Game time: 1:00 p.m. PST
- Game weather: Temperature: 62 °F (17 °C) • Wind: N 9 mph • Weather: Fair Weather, Clouds
- Game attendance: 17,373
- Referee: Mike Cuttone
- TV announcers (AT&TSN): Drew Goodman (Play-by-play), Sed Bonner (analyst) & Brad Thompson (sideline)
- ESPN – Late TD, interception lifts UNLV over San Jose State 38–35 /// Box Score, San Jose State at UNLV /// Pregame Notes /// Postgame Notes

Game information

First Quarter

- (10:02) UNLV TD – Charles Williams 12-yard rush, Daniel Gutierrez kick
  Drive: 4 plays, 74 yards, 1:52; UNLV 7–0
- (03:51) SJSU TD – DeJon Packer 1-yard rush, Matt Mercurio kick failed
  Drive: 13 plays, 75 yards, 6:11; UNLV 7–6

Second Quarter

- (14:19) UNLV TD – Shelton Zeon III 7-yard pass from Kenyon Oblad, Daniel Gutierrez kick
  Drive: 3 plays, 30 yards, 1:05; UNLV 14–6
- (09:37) UNLV TD – Randal Grimes 35-yard pass from Kenyon Oblad, Daniel Gutierrez kick
  Drive: 7 plays, 61 yards, 3:11; UNLV 21–6

Third Quarter

- (10:07) SJSU TD – DeJon Packer 65-yard pass from Josh Love, Isaiah Holiness pass
  Drive: 4 plays, 80 yards, 1:38; UNLV 21–14
- (07:05) UNLV FG – Daniel Gutierrez 45-yard field goal
  Drive: 7 plays, 47 yards, 3:02; UNLV 24–14
- (01:04) SJSU TD – Jack Snyder 4-yard rush, Matt Mercurio kick
  Drive: 3 plays, 23 yards, 0:56; UNLV 24–21
- (00:00) SJSU TD – Brett Foley 26-yard pass from Josh Love, Matt Mercurio kick
  Drive: 1 play, 26 yards, 0:00; San Jose State 28–24

Fourth Quarter

- (10:09) UNLV TD – Charles Williams 4-yard rush, Daniel Gutierrez kick
  Drive: 9 plays, 50 yards, 3:44; UNLV 31–28
- (06:17) SJSU TD – Tre Walker 25-yard pass from Josh Love, Matt Mercurio kick
  Drive: 8 plays, 50 yards, 3:43; San Jose State 35–31
- (01:15) UNLV TD – Charles Williams 1-yard rush, Daniel Gutierrez kick
  Drive: 9 plays, 70 yards, 1:34; UNLV 38–35

Passing

- SJSU – Josh Love: 37/56, 465 yards, 3 TD, 4 INT
- UNLV – Kenyon Oblad: 21/36, 203 yards, 2 TD, 1 INT

Rushing

- SJSU – DeJon Packer: 16 carries, 78 yards, 1 TD
- UNLV – Charles Williams: 27 carries, 186 yards, 3 TD

Receiving

- SJSU – Tre Walker: 12 receptions, 133 yards, 1 TD
- UNLV – Randal Grimes: 6 receptions, 130 yards, 1 TD

=== Fresno State ===
Battle for the Valley Trophy: Fresno State Bulldogs at San Jose State Spartans

Quarter	1	2	3	4	Total
Bulldogs	14	2	0	0	16
Spartans	3	0	7	7	17

at CEFCU Stadium, San Jose, CA

- Date: November 30, 2019
- Game time: 7:30 p.m. PST
- Game weather: Temperature: 50 °F (10 °C) • Wind: SE 25 mph • Weather: Light Rain & Windy
- Game attendance: 12,835
- Referee: Brad Van Vark
- TV announcers (ESPN2): Dave LaMont (Play-by-play), Ray Bentley (analyst) & Taylor McGregor (sideline)
- ESPN – Packer, San Jose St. beat Fresno St. 17–16, snap 3-game skid /// Box Score, Fresno State at San Jose State /// Pregame Notes /// Postgame Notes

Game information

First Quarter

- (07:49) FS TD – Jared Rice 38-yard pass from Jorge Reyna, Cesar Silva kick
  Drive: 9 plays, 98 yards, 3:43; Fresno State 7–0
- (05:08) FS TD – Ronnie Rivers 5-yard rush, Cesar Silva kick
  Drive: 4 plays, 61 yards, 0:58; Fresno State 14–0
- (01:13) SJSU FG – Matt Mercurio 22-yard field goal
  Drive: 9 plays, 70 yards, 3:55; Fresno State 14–3

Second Quarter

- (05:27) FS SF – Justin Rice 10-yard safety
  Drive: 0 plays, 0 yards, 0:00; Fresno State 16–3

Third Quarter

- (09:43) SJSU TD – Josh Love 2-yard rush, Matt Mercurio kick
  Drive: 7 plays, 87 yards, 2:41; Fresno State 16–10

Fourth Quarter

- (02:11) SJSU TD – DeJon Packer 10-yard rush, Matt Mercurio kick
  Drive: 7 plays, 83 yards, 2:53; San Jose State 17–16

Passing

- FS – Jorge Reyna: 15/22, 151 yards, 1 TD, 1 INT
- SJSU – Josh Love: 23/34, 290 yards

Rushing

- FS – Ronnie Rivers: 29 carries, 177 yards, 1 TD
- SJSU – DeJon Packer: 17 carries, 93 yards, 1 TD

Receiving

- FS – Ronnie Rivers: 8 receptions, 63 yards
- SJSU – Tre Walker: 8 receptions, 132 yards

== Awards and honors ==
Mountain West Conference Offensive Player of the Year - Josh Love, QB

=== All-Conference Team ===
First Team Offense

- Josh Love, QB, Senior
- Tre Walker, WR, Junior

Second-Team Defense

- Ethan Aguayo, LB, Senior

Honorable Mentions

- Bailey Gaither, WR, Senior
- Troy Kowalski, OL, Senior
- Matt Mercurio, PK, Freshman
- Jack Snyder, OL, Junior
