= 2019 Nevada Wolf Pack football team =

American college football season

2019 Nevada Wolf Pack football

Famous Idaho Potato Bowl, L 21−30 vs. Ohio
- Conference: Mountain West Conference
- West Division
- Record: 7–6 (4–4 MW)
- Head coach: Jay Norvell (3rd season)
- Offensive coordinator: Matt Mumme (3rd season)
- Offensive scheme: Air raid
- Defensive coordinator: Jeff Casteel (3rd season, regular season); Jody Sears (1st season, bowl game)
- Base defense: 3–3–5
- Home stadium: Mackay Stadium

2019 Mountain West Conference football standings
	Conf.			Overall
Team	W		L	W		L
Mountain Division
No. 23 Boise State xy$	8	–	0	12	–	2
No. 22 Air Force	7	–	1	11	–	2
Utah State	6	–	2	7	–	6
Wyoming	4	–	4	8	–	5
Colorado State	3	–	5	4	–	8
New Mexico	0	–	8	2	–	10
West Division
Hawaii xy	5	–	3	10	–	5
San Diego State x	5	–	3	10	–	3
Nevada	4	–	4	7	–	6
San Jose State	2	–	6	5	–	7
UNLV	2	–	6	4	–	8
Fresno State	2	–	6	4	–	8
Championship: Boise State 31, Hawaii 10
$ – Conference champion; x – Division champion/co-champions; y – Championship game participant; Rankings from AP Poll

The 2019 Nevada Wolf Pack football team represented the University of Nevada, Reno in the 2019 NCAA Division I FBS football season. The Wolf Pack were led by third–year head coach Jay Norvell and played their home games at Mackay Stadium. They were members of the West Division of the Mountain West Conference. They finished the season 7–6 and 4–4 in Mountain West play to finish in third place in the West division.

== Coaching changes ==
Jeff Casteel was relieved of his duties as defensive coordinator. Former Sacramento State head coach Jody Sears took over as Wolf Pack's Defensive Coordinator for the bowl game. Norvell said "Jeff, David and Mike have made significant contributions to our program and I'm appreciative of their efforts with the Wolf Pack, We are moving forward in a new direction, and we are preparing for the bowl game at this time." and Norvell again said "We're excited to have these high quality coaches with us as we prepare for a really good Ohio team in the Famous Idaho Potato Bowl, With the early signing period behind us, our sole purpose is to prepare our players to win the bowl game. We will focus on filling permanent additions to the staff in January. Probably the most important thing is getting the right coaches here for the long term, I'm not going to hurry through that process. I'm going to take my time. I'm going to talk to everybody I know. We'll talk to college coaches, professional coaches, everybody that I respect we'll get information from and we'll make sure we have the right people who have the qualities that we need to take the next step."

== Preseason ==
=== Award watch lists ===
Listed in the order that they were released

Award	Player	Position	Year
Maxwell Award	Toa Taua	RB	SO
Chuck Bednarik Award	Gabriel Sewell	LB	SR
Doak Walker Award	Toa Taua	RB	SO
Outland Trophy	Jake Nelson	OL	SR
Wuerffel Trophy	Lucas Weber	LB	SR
Ted Hendricks Award	Dom Peterson	DE	SO

=== Mountain West media days ===
The Mountain West media days were held on July 23–24, 2019, at Green Valley Ranch in Henderson, Nevada.

==== Media poll ====
The preseason poll was released on July 23, 2019. The Wolf Pack were predicted to finish in third place in the MW West Division.

==== Preseason All–Mountain West Team ====
The Wolf Pack had two players selected to the preseason All–Mountain West Team; two from the offense.

Offense

Toa Taua – RB

Jake Nelson – OL

== Schedule ==
Date	Time	Opponent	Site	TV	Result	Attendance
August 30	6:30 p.m.	Purdue*	Mackay Stadium; Reno, NV	CBSSN	W 34–31	20,144
September 7	4:30 p.m.	at No. 16 Oregon*	Autzen Stadium; Eugene, OR	P12N	L 6–77	50,920
September 14	4:00 p.m.	No. 6 (Div. I FCS) Weber State*	Mackay Stadium; Reno, NV	ESPN3	W 19–13	14,174
September 21	5:00 p.m.	at UTEP*	Sun Bowl; El Paso, TX	ESPN3	W 37–21	10,493
September 28	7:30 p.m.	Hawaii^{†}	Mackay Stadium; Reno, NV	ESPN2	L 3–54	15,137
October 12	1:00 p.m.	San Jose State	Mackay Stadium; Reno, NV	AT&T RM	W 41–38	15,311
October 19	7:15 p.m.	at Utah State	Maverik Stadium; Logan, UT	ESPNU	L 10–36	15,240
October 26	11:00 a.m.	at Wyoming	War Memorial Stadium; Laramie, WY	AT&T RM	L 3–31	16,126
November 2	7:30 p.m.	New Mexico	Mackay Stadium; Reno, NV (Battle of the Wolves)	ESPNU	W 21–10	15,631
November 9	7:30 p.m.	at No. 24 San Diego State	SDCCU Stadium; San Diego, CA	ESPN2	W 17–13	27,973
November 23	7:30 p.m.	at Fresno State	Bulldog Stadium; Fresno, CA	ESPN2	W 35–28	32,303
November 30	12:00 p.m.	UNLV	Mackay Stadium; Reno, NV (Battle for the Fremont Cannon / Silver State Series)	AT&T RM	L 30–33 ^{OT}	16,683
January 3, 2020	12:30 p.m.	vs. Ohio*	Albertsons Stadium; Boise, ID (Famous Idaho Potato Bowl)	ESPN	L 21–30	13,611
*Non-conference game; ^{†}Homecoming; Rankings from AP Poll released prior to the game; All times are in Pacific time

== Personnel ==
2019 Nevada Wolf Pack football team roster
Players
Coaches
Offense

Pos.	#	Name	Class
WR	1	Melquan Stovall	Fr
RB	2	Devonte Lee	So
WR	3	Kaleb Fossum	Sr
WR	4	Elijah Cooks	Jr
QB	6	Hamish McClure	Fr
WR	7	Romeo Doubs	So
QB	8	Kaymen Cureton	So
WR	8	Brendan O'Leary–Orange	Sr
TE	9	Crishaun Lappin	So
WR	10	Ben Putman	Sr
QB	12	Carson Strong (C)	Fr
QB	13	Cristian Solano	Sr
WR	14	Dominic Christian	Sr
TE	15	Henry Ikahihifo	Fr
QB	16	Malik Henry (I)	Jr
WR	17	Justin Lockhart	Fr
QB	18	Kaiden Bennett	Fr
WR	18	John Humphrey	Sr
WR	19	Cole Turner	So
RB	20	Roger Neal	Jr
RB	23	Kelton Moore	Sr
WR	25	Jeshua Fixel	Fr
TE	31	Reagan Roberson	Jr
RB	35	Toa Taua	So
RB	39	Aundre Carter	Jr
TE	40	Daniel Grzesiak	Fr
RB	42	Terrell Johnson	Jr
OL	52	Cole Watts	Fr
OL	54	Jermaine Ledbetter	Jr
OL	55	Tyler Orsini	Jr
OL	56	Zac Welch	Fr
OL	60	Donovan Carter	Fr
OL	61	Alex Tancreto	Jr
OL	64	Blake Baughman	Fr
OL	65	Aaron Frost	So
OL	67	Gray Davis	So
OL	69	Trey Price	So
OL	70	Nathan Edwards	Jr
OL	71	Jake Nelson	Sr
OL	72	Miles Beach	Jr
OL	73	Christopher Love	Fr
OL	75	Jack Bolduc	Fr
OL	76	Nate Brown	Jr
OL	77	Trey Hamilton	Fr
OL	79	Moses Landis	So
WR	81	Charles Ross	Fr
TE	86	Ryan Brocks	Jr
WR	87	Will Barnard	So
WR	89	Carson Walters	So

Defense

Pos.	#	Name	Class
DB	1	Berdale Robins	Jr
DB	2	Cam Stephens	Fr
DL	3	Javasia Brunson	Fr
DB	4	E.J. Muhammad	Sr
DB	5	Emany Johnson	Fr
DB	6	Tyson Williams	So
LB	7	Gabriel Sewell	Sr
DL	9	Breylon Garcia	Fr
LB	11	Daiyan Henley	Jr
DB	12	Mar'Quette Jackson	Jr
DB	13	Jordan Lee	So
DB	14	Kacee Williams	Fr
DB	15	Jaden Dedman	Fr
LB	16	Maliek Broady	Sr
LB	17	James Fotofili	So
DB	18	John Humphrey	Sr
DB	19	Kieran Clark	Fr
DB	22	Jayce Godley	Fr
LB	23	Jack Powers	Fr
LB	24	Lucas Weber	Sr
DB	25	Daniel Brown (S)	Sr
DB	26	Avery Carrington	Fr
DB	28	Austin Arnold (S)	Jr
DB	29	Isaiah Hamilton	Jr
LB	30	Lawson Hall	Jr
DB	31	Christian Swint	So
LB	32	Giovanni Miranda	Fr
DB	33	JoJuan Claiborne	So
LB	34	Josiah Bradley	Fr
DB	37	Daylon Johnson	Jr
DB	40	Maurice Wilmer	Fr
LB	42	Erick Kroll	So
DB	42	Patrick Willis	Fr
LB	44	Javanz Dornners	Fr
LB	45	Trevor Price	So
DE	47	Kameron Toomer	Jr
LB	50	Lamin Touray	So
LB	52	Kyle Adams	Sr
DE	53	Zak Mahannah	Jr
DT	54	Chris Green	Jr
LB	56	Sheldon Wilkinson	So
DE	57	Jaden Lewis	So
LB	58	Ryan Madole	Fr
LB	59	Anthony Allen	Fr
DE	63	Amir Johnson	So
DL	73	Christopher Love	Fr
DB	83	Mikael Bradford	Jr
DL	90	Breylon Garcia	Fr
DE	91	Adam Lopez	Sr
DE	92	Kaleb Meder	Sr
DL	93	Curtis Bonam	Fr
DL	94	Logan Arnold	Fr
DT	95	Tristan Nichols	Jr
DT	96	Hausia Sekona (S)	Sr
LB	97	Jace Keema	Fr
DE	98	Sam Hammond	Jr
DE	99	Dom Peterson	So

Special teams

Pos.	#	Name	Class
P	35	Quinton Conaway	Sr
PK	36	Julian Diaz	Jr
PK	43	Brandon Talton	Fr
P	46	Eric Fellenzer	Fr
PK	48	Spencer Pettit	Sr
LS	49	Karson Thomas	So
LS	51	Robert Hill	Jr
LS	85	Austin Ortega	Fr

Head coach

- Jay Norvell

Coordinators/assistant coaches

- Angus McClure – Assistant head coach/offensive line
- Matt Mumme – Offensive coordinator/quarterbacks
- Jeff Casteel – Defensive coordinator/linebackers
- Jody Sears – Interim Defensive coordinator/linebackers
- Mike Chamoures – Safeties
- Josh Brown – Interim Safeties
- David Lockwood – Secondary
- John Landwehr – Interim Secondary
- Tommy Perry – Special teams
- Timmy Chang – Inside receivers
- Jason Kaufusi – Defensive line
- Eric Scott – Wide receivers
- Jackie Shipp – Defensive line
- Vai Taua – Running backs
- Clayton Webb – Offensive quality control
- Ben Bezilla – Defensive quality control
- Jimbo Davis – Special teams quality control
- Jack Ray – Special teams quality control
- Jordon Simmons – Director of football strength and conditioning
- Jarwarski Beckum – Assistant director of football strength and conditioning
- Tyler Crandall – Student Assistant/strength and conditioning coach
- Chad Savage – Graduate assistant (Offense)
- Gunnar White – Graduate assistant (Offense)
- Korey Rush – Graduate assistant (Defense)

Support staff

- Vince Hug – Director of football operations
- Nicole Wadden – Assistant director of football operations
- Lucas Gauthier – Director of player personnel
- Colton Bosnos – Assistant director of player personnel
- Ryan Mitchell – Senior Associate Director of Athletics for Intercollegiate Services
- Andrew Caudill – Assistant athletic director and academics
- Chad Hartley – Associate Athletic Director and Strategic Communications
- Spencer Hiett – MS, LAT and ATC Assistant Director of Sports Medicine
- Morgan Demartini – MS Assistant Director of Sports Medicine
- Damien Garrett – Assistant athletic director and equipment operations
- Kaleb Daws – Assistant equipment manager
- Shannon O'Hair – Assistant equipment manager
- Cindy Breeden – Administrative assistant

Legend

- (C) Team captain
- (S) Suspended
- (I) Ineligible
- Injured
- Redshirt

Roster
Last update: February 9, 2021

== Game summaries ==
=== Purdue ===
Purdue at Nevada

Team	1	2	3	4	Total
Boilermakers	10	14	7	0	31
• Wolf Pack	0	7	10	17	34

- Date: August 30, 2019
- Location: Mackay Stadium
  Reno, NV
- Game start: 6:33 p.m. PDT
- Elapsed time: 3 hours and 58 minutes
- Game attendance: 20,144
- Game weather: Temperature: 86 °F (30 °C) • Weather: Sunny • Wind: WNW 10 MPH
- Referee: Kevin Hassell
- TV announcers (CBSSN): Dave Ryan (play–by–play) and Corey Chavous (analyst)

Scoring summary
1	09:37	PUR	Brycen Hopkins 2–yard pass from Elijah Sindelar (J.D. Dellinger kick) (12 plays, 70 yards, 5:23)	PUR 7–0
1	02:05	PUR	J.D. Dellinger 32–yard field goal (8 plays, 34 yards, 3:29)	PUR 10–0
2	04:43	NEV	Dominic Christian 38–yard pass from Carson Strong (Brandon Talton kick) (7 plays, 53 yards, 2:19)	PUR 10–7
2	03:15	PUR	Jackson Anthrop 38–yard pass from Elijah Sindelar (J.D. Dellinger kick) (5 plays, 75 yards, 1:28)	PUR 17–7
2	00:27	PUR	Rondale Moore 39–yard pass from Elijah Sindelar (J.D. Dellinger kick) (10 plays, 99 yards, 2:09)	PUR 24–7
3	06:49	NEV	Elijah Cooks 21–yard pass from Carson Strong (Brandon Talton kick) (4 plays, 36 yards, 1:28)	PUR 24–14
3	06:19	PUR	David Bell 49–yard pass from Elijah Sindelar (J.D. Dellinger kick) (2 plays, 75 yards, 0:30)	PUR 31–14
3	03:21	NEV	Brandon Talton 34–yard field goal (4 plays, –3 yards, 1:01)	PUR 31–17
4	06:56	NEV	Toa Taua 7–yard run (Brandon Talton kick) (11 plays, 74 yards, 5:07)	PUR 31–24
4	00:52	NEV	Elijah Cooks 20–yard pass from Carson Strong (Brandon Talton kick) (11 plays, 87 yards, 2:40)	TIE 31–31
4	00:00	NEV	Brandon Talton 56–yard field goal (6 plays, 27 yards, 0:38)	NEV 34–31

Statistics	Purdue	Nevada
First downs	24	19
Total yards	519	404
Rushing yards	96	109
Passing yards	423	295
Turnovers	8	0
Time of possession	31:23	28:37

Team	Category	Player	Statistics
Purdue	Passing	Elijah Sindelar	34/52, 423 yards, 4 TDs, 2 INTs
Purdue	Rushing	Zander Horvath	19 carries, 66 yards
Purdue	Receiving	Rondale Moore	2 receptions, 124 yards, 1 TD
Nevada	Passing	Carson Strong	30/51, 295 yards, 3 TDs
Nevada	Rushing	Toa Taua	12 carries, 56 yards, 1 TD
Nevada	Receiving	Toa Taua	8 receptions, 64 yards

=== At Oregon ===
Nevada at Oregon

Team	1	2	3	4	Total
Wolf Pack	3	3	0	0	6
• No. 16 Ducks	7	28	28	14	77

- Date: September 7, 2019
- Location: Mackay Stadium
  Reno, NV
- Game start: 4:45 p.m. PDT
- Elapsed time: 3 hours and 14 minutes
- Game attendance: 50,920
- Game weather: Temperature: 65 °F (18 °C) • Weather: Cloudy • Wind: SW 10 MPH
- Referee: Mike McCabe
- TV announcers (P12N): Roxy Bernstein (play–by–play), Anthony Herron (analyst) and Jill Savage (sideline)

Scoring summary
1	06:13	NEV	Brandon Talton 24–yard field goal (6 plays, 5 yards, 3:10)	NEV 3–0
1	03:56	ORE	Jake Breeland 66–yard pass from Justin Herbert (Camden Lewis kick) (5 plays, 77 yards, 2:17)	ORE 7–3
2	10:38	NEV	Brandon Talton 45–yard field goal (17 plays, 47 yards, 8:18)	ORE 7–6
2	08:28	ORE	C. J. Verdell 2–yard run (Camden Lewis kick) (6 plays, 75 yards, 2:10)	ORE 14–6
2	07:13	ORE	Ryan Bay 16–yard pass from Justin Herbert (Camden Lewis kick) (2 plays, 35 yards, 0:28)	ORE 21–6
2	03:26	ORE	Brady Aiello 1–yard pass from Justin Herbert (Camden Lewis kick) (3 plays, 7 yards, 1:24)	ORE 28–6
2	00:12	ORE	Bryan Addison 24–yard pass from Justin Herbert (Camden Lewis kick) (7 plays, 77 yards, 1:23)	ORE 35–6
3	10:12	ORE	Daewood Davis 16–yard pass from Justin Herbert (Adam Stack kick) (10 plays, 75 yards, 3:16)	ORE 42–6
3	08:14	ORE	Cyrus Habibi-Likio 11–yard run (Adam Stack kick) (4 plays, 22 yards, 1:35)	ORE 49–6
3	07:16	ORE	Jaylon Reed 7–yard pass from Tyler Shough (Adam Stack kick) (3 plays, 5 yards, 0:40)	ORE 56–6
3	02:02	ORE	Brady Breeze 11–yard fumble recovery (Adam Stack kick)	ORE 63–6
4	06:58	ORE	Hunter Kampmoyer 21–yard pass from Tyler Shough (Adam Stack kick) (15 plays, 80 yards, 6:15)	ORE 70–6
4	02:02	ORE	Darrian Felix 62–yard run (Adam Stack kick) (3 plays, 75 yards, 1:04)	ORE 77–6

Statistics	Nevada	Oregon
First downs	12	28
Total yards	192	623
Rushing yards	83	221
Passing yards	109	402
Turnovers	6	2
Time of possession	33:35	26:25

Team	Category	Player	Statistics
Nevada	Passing	Carson Strong	13/25, 89 yards, 2 INTs
Nevada	Rushing	Jaxson Kincaide	13 carries, 52 yards
Nevada	Receiving	Kelton Moore	1 reception, 23 yards
Oregon	Passing	Justin Herbert	19/26, 310 yards, 5 TDs
Oregon	Rushing	Darrian Felix	8 carries, 80 yards, 1 TD
Oregon	Receiving	Jake Breeland	4 receptions, 112 yards, 1 TD

=== Weber State ===
Weber State at Nevada

Team	1	2	3	4	Total
No. 6 (Div. I FCS) Wildcats	0	10	3	0	13
• Wolf Pack	3	6	7	3	19

- Date: September 14, 2019
- Location: Mackay Stadium
  Reno, NV
- Game start: 4:05 p.m. PDT
- Elapsed time: 3 hours and 5 minutes
- Game attendance: 14,174
- Game weather: Temperature: 91 °F (33 °C) • Weather: Sunny • Wind: N 4 MPH
- Referee: Stephen Baron
- TV announcers (ESPN3): Trey Bender (play–by–play) and Al Groh (analyst)

Scoring summary
1	10:38	NEV	Brandon Talton 36–yard field goal (10 plays, 56 yards, 4:22)	NEV 3–0
2	13:56	WSU	Trey Tuttle 43–yard field goal (7 plays, 38 yards, 2:43)	TIE 3–3
2	11:00	WSU	Rashid Shaheed 11–yard pass from Kaden Jenks (Trey Tuttle kick) (2 plays, 15 yards, 0:51)	WSU 10–3
2	03:34	NEV	Brandon Talton 30–yard field goal (10 plays, 20 yards, 4:07)	WSU 10–6
2	00:09	NEV	Brandon Talton 25–yard field goal (10 plays, 71 yards, 2:31)	WSU 10–9
3	07:50	NEV	Jaxson Kincaide 33–yard run (Brandon Talton kick) (9 plays, 85 yards, 3:40)	NEV 16–10
3	00:50	WSU	Trey Tuttle 47–yard field goal (4 plays, 2 yards, 1:29)	NEV 16–13
4	04:49	NEV	Brandon Talton 34–yard field goal (6 plays, 25 yards, 2:20)	NEV 19–13

Statistics	Weber State	Nevada
First downs	10	25
Total yards	125	453
Rushing yards	62	153
Passing yards	63	300
Turnovers	1	2
Time of possession	22:35	37:25

Team	Category	Player	Statistics
Weber State	Passing	Kaden Jenks	6/21, 57 yards, 1 TD, 1 INT
Weber State	Rushing	Kevin Smith	13 carries, 26 yards
Weber State	Receiving	Rashid Shaheed	3 receptions, 30 yards, 1 TD
Nevada	Passing	Carson Strong	30/44, 299 yards, 2 INTs
Nevada	Rushing	Toa Taua	16 carries, 85 yards
Nevada	Receiving	Kaleb Fossum	5 receptions, 77 yards

=== At UTEP ===
Nevada at UTEP

Team	1	2	3	4	Total
• Wolf Pack	0	21	3	13	37
Miners	7	7	7	0	21

- Date: September 21, 2019
- Location: Sun Bowl
  El Paso, TX
- Game start: 6:05 p.m. MDT
- Elapsed time: 2 hours and 55 minutes
- Game attendance: 10,493
- Game weather: Temperature: 70 °F (21 °C) • Weather: Cloudy • Wind: SSE 7 MPH
- Referee: Rodney Burnette
- TV announcers (ESPN3): Andy Morgan (play–by–play) and Trevor Vittatoe (analyst)

Scoring summary
1	08:10	UTEP	Treyvon Hughes 4–yard run (Gavin Baechle kick) (10 plays, 70 yards, 6:03)	UTEP 7–0
2	14:56	NEV	Toa Taua 5–yard run (Brandon Talton kick) (9 plays, 73 yards, 3:59)	TIE 7–7
2	06:49	UTEP	Treyvon Hughes 6–yard run (Gavin Baechle kick) (10 plays, 86 yards, 6:05)	UTEP 14–7
2	03:02	NEV	Elijah Cooks 28–yard pass from Cristian Solano (Brandon Talton kick) (9 plays, 75 yards, 3:47)	TIE 14–14
2	02:23	NEV	Elijah Cooks 20–yard pass from Cristian Solano (Brandon Talton kick) (3 plays, 22 yards, 0:27)	NEV 21–14
3	05:01	UTEP	Kai Locksley 1–yard run (Gavin Baechle kick) (17 plays, 75 yards, 9:59)	TIE 21–21
3	01:49	NEV	Brandon Talton 27–yard field goal (8 plays, 65 yards, 3:12)	NEV 24–21
4	13:22	NEV	Kelton Moore 5–yard run (Brandon Talton kick blocked) (4 plays, 15 yards, 1:38)	NEV 30–21
4	04:08	NEV	Kelton Moore 1–yard run (Brandon Talton kick) (8 plays, 70 yards, 4:44)	NEV 37–21

Statistics	Nevada	UTEP
First downs	19	17
Total yards	403	278
Rushing yards	193	162
Passing yards	210	116
Turnovers	2	0
Time of possession	25:05	34:55

Team	Category	Player	Statistics
Nevada	Passing	Cristian Solano	13/19, 182 yards, 2 TDs, 1 INT
Nevada	Rushing	Cristian Solano	10 carries, 100 yards
Nevada	Receiving	Elijah Cooks	4 receptions, 82 yards, 2 TDs
UTEP	Passing	Brandon Jones	8/11, 106 yards, 1 INT
UTEP	Rushing	Treyvon Hughes	17 carries, 80 yards, 2 TDs
UTEP	Receiving	Jess Trussell	3 receptions, 53 yards

=== Hawaii ===
Hawaii at Nevada

Team	1	2	3	4	Total
• Rainbow Warriors	7	24	14	9	54
Wolf Pack	0	3	0	0	3

- Date: September 28, 2019
- Location: Mackay Stadium
  Reno, NV
- Game start: 7:35 p.m. PDT
- Elapsed time: 3 hours and 10 minutes
- Game attendance: 15,137
- Game weather: Temperature: 39 °F (4 °C) • Weather: Cool and Rain • Wind: N 9 MPH
- Referee: Michael VanderVelde
- TV announcers (ESPN2): Clay Matvick (play–by–play) and Ryan Leaf (analyst)

Scoring summary
1	08:17	UH	Cedric Byrd II 36–yard pass from Cole McDonald (Ryan Meskell kick) (5 plays, 62 yards, 2:19)	UH 7–0
2	10:40	UH	Cedric Byrd II 2–yard pass from Cole McDonald (Ryan Meskell kick) (9 plays, 80 yards, 4:22)	UH 14–0
2	09:11	UH	Justice Augafa 2–yard blocked punt return (Ryan Meskell kick)	UH 21–0
2	05:33	UH	Miles Reed 9–yard run (Ryan Meskell kick) (3 plays, 47 yards, 1:22)	UH 28–0
2	00:36	NEV	Brandon Talton 36–yard field goal (14 plays, 61 yards, 4:53)	UH 28–3
2	00:02	UH	Ryan Meskell 44–yard field goal (5 plays, 45 yards, 0:28)	UH 31–3
3	11:02	UH	Jason–Matthew Sharsh 12–yard pass from Cole McDonald (Ryan Meskell kick) (5 plays, 63 yards, 2:26)	UH 38–3
3	02:57	UH	Cedric Byrd II 20–yard pass from Cole McDonald (Ryan Meskell kick) (8 plays, 80 yards, 3:52)	UH 45–3
4	09:20	UH	Team 18–yard safety	UH 47–3
4	03:42	UH	Robert Funkhouser 14–yard pass from Justin Uahinui (9 plays, 75 yards, 5:33)	UH 54–3

Statistics	Hawaii	Nevada
First downs	26	16
Total yards	512	203
Rushing yards	139	98
Passing yards	373	105
Turnovers	0	3
Time of possession	31:12	28:48

Team	Category	Player	Statistics
Hawaii	Passing	Cole McDonald	25/30, 312 yards, 4 TDs
Hawaii	Rushing	Fred Holly III	11 carries, 63 yards
Hawaii	Receiving	Jason–Matthew Sharsh	9 receptions, 123 yards, 1 TD
Nevada	Passing	Cristian Solano	11/17, 59 yards, 1 INT
Nevada	Rushing	Toa Taua	17 carries, 72 yards
Nevada	Receiving	Elijah Cooks	5 receptions, 38 yards

=== San Jose State ===
San Jose State at Nevada

Team	1	2	3	4	Total
Spartans	3	7	14	14	38
• Wolf Pack	14	10	7	10	41

- Date: October 12, 2019
- Location: Mackay Stadium
  Reno, NV
- Game start: 1:08 p.m. PDT
- Elapsed time: 3 hours and 28 minutes
- Game attendance: 15,311
- Game weather: Temperature: 58 °F (14 °C) • Weather: Clear and Sunny • Wind: S 2 MPH
- Referee: Cal McNeill
- TV announcers (AT&T RM): Drew Goodman (play–by–play), Sherdrick Bonner (analyst) and Brad Thompson (sideline)

Scoring summary
1	10:17	NEV	Devonte Lee 2–yard run (Brandon Talton kick) (6 plays, 66 yards, 2:41)	NEV 7–0
1	09:34	NEV	Austin Arnold 40–yard interception (Brandon Talton kick)	NEV 14–0
1	07:10	SJSU	Matt Mercurio 44–yard field goal (6 plays, 48 yards, 2:24)	NEV 14–3
2	14:00	NEV	Devonte Lee 1–yard run (Brandon Talton kick) (11 plays, 77 yards, 4:23)	NEV 21–3
2	05:12	NEV	Brandon Talton 25–yard field goal (14 plays, 37 yards, 6:15)	NEV 24–3
2	00:27	SJSU	Isaiah Hamilton 37–yard pass from Josh Love (Matt Mercurio kick) (3 plays, 61 yards, 0:17)	NEV 24–10
3	14:52	NEV	Romeo Doubs 75–yard pass from Malik Henry (Brandon Talton kick) (1 play, 75 yards, 0:08)	NEV 31–10
3	14:17	SJSU	Bailey Gaither 60–yard pass from Josh Love (Matt Mercurio kick) (2 plays, 75 yards, 0:35)	NEV 31–17
3	06:09	SJSU	DeJon Packer 1–yard run (Matt Mercurio kick) (5 plays, 29 yards, 1:31)	NEV 31–24
4	08:20	SJSU	Tre Walker 20–yard pass from Josh Love (Matt Mercurio kick) (10 plays, 80 yards, 3:42)	TIE 31–31
4	03:53	NEV	Toa Taua 1–yard run (Brandon Talton kick) (11 plays, 75 yards, 4:27)	NEV 38–31
4	02:36	SJSU	DeJon Packer 2–yard run (Matt Mercurio kick) (7 plays, 68 yards, 1:11)	TIE 38–38
4	00:00	NEV	Brandon Talton 40–yard field goal (7 plays, 46 yards, 2:30)	NEV 41–38

Statistics	San Jose State	Nevada
First downs	16	25
Total yards	420	541
Rushing yards	15	189
Passing yards	405	352
Turnovers	5	4
Time of possession	20:44	39:16

Team	Category	Player	Statistics
San Jose State	Passing	Josh Love	23/45, 405 yards, 3 TDs, 1 INT
San Jose State	Rushing	Nick Nash	3 carries, 23 yards
San Jose State	Receiving	Bailey Gaither	5 receptions, 131 yards, 1 TD
Nevada	Passing	Malik Henry	22/37, 352 yards, 1 TD, 2 INTs
Nevada	Rushing	Toa Taua	34 carries, 160 yards, 1 TD
Nevada	Receiving	Romeo Doubs	5 receptions, 146 yards, 1 TD

=== At Utah State ===
Nevada at Utah State

Team	1	2	3	4	Total
Wolf Pack	3	0	0	7	10
• Aggies	9	13	0	14	36

- Date: October 19, 2019
- Location: Maverik Stadium
  Logan, UT
- Game start: 8:15 p.m. MDT
- Elapsed time: 3 hours and 34 minutes
- Game attendance: 15,240
- Game weather: Temperature: 35 °F (2 °C) • Weather: Cloudy • Wind: SSE 12 MPH
- Referee: Michael VanderVelde
- TV announcers (ESPNU): Mike Couzens (play–by–play) and Kirk Morrison (analyst)

Scoring summary
1	09:45	NEV	Brandon Talton 23–yard field goal (10 plays, 75 yards, 5:10)	NEV 3–0
1	09:33	USU	Savon Scarver 100–yard kickoff return (Dominik Eberle kick)	USU 7–3
1	00:08	USU	Justus Te'i 1–yard safety	USU 9–3
2	10:58	USU	Dominik Eberle 29–yard field goal (6 plays, 23 yards, 1:43)	USU 12–3
2	05:33	USU	Caleb Repp 13–yard pass from Jordan Love (7 plays, 39 yards, 1:50)	USU 19–3
2	02:07	USU	Dominik Eberle 32–yard field goal (8 plays, 57 yards, 1:39)	USU 22–3
4	11:27	USU	Gerold Bright 67–yard run (Dominik Eberle kick) (3 plays, 80 yards, 0:38)	USU 29–3
4	10:03	USU	Gerold Bright 9–yard run (Dominik Eberle kick) (2 plays, 57 yards, 0:23)	USU 36–3
4	04:48	NEV	Toa Taua 20–yard run (Brandon Talton kick) (12 plays, 75 yards, 5:15)	USU 36–10

Statistics	Nevada	Utah State
First downs	15	22
Total yards	326	418
Rushing yards	113	244
Passing yards	213	174
Turnovers	2	3
Time of possession	34:39	25:21

Team	Category	Player	Statistics
Nevada	Passing	Malik Henry	17/38, 213 yards, 2 INTs
Nevada	Rushing	Toa Taua	20 carries, 84 yards, 1 TD
Nevada	Receiving	Romeo Doubs	4 receptions, 80 yards
Utah State	Passing	Jordan Love	13/31, 169 yards, 1 TD, 1 INT
Utah State	Rushing	Gerold Bright	15 carries, 126 yards, 2 TDs
Utah State	Receiving	Siaosi Mariner	2 receptions, 53 yards

=== At Wyoming ===
Nevada at Wyoming

Team	1	2	3	4	Total
Wolf Pack	3	0	0	0	3
• Cowboys	14	10	7	0	31

- Date: October 26, 2019
- Location: War Memorial Stadium
  Laramie, WY
- Game start: 12:08 p.m. MDT
- Elapsed time: 2 hours and 49 minutes
- Game attendance: 16,126
- Game weather: Temperature: 55 °F (13 °C) • Weather: Sunny • Wind: WSW 26 MPH
- Referee: Kevin Hassell
- TV announcers (AT&T RM): Drew Goodman (play–by–play), Sherdrick Bonner (analyst) and Brad Thompson (sideline)

Scoring summary
1	13:14	WYO	Xazavian Valladay 53–yard pass from Sean Chambers (Cooper Rothe kick) (1 play, 53 yards, 0:09)	WYO 7–0
1	08:49	WYO	Sean Chambers 2–yard run (Cooper Rothe kick) (7 plays, 52 yards, 3:03)	WYO 14–0
1	02:21	NEV	Brandon Talton 28–yard field goal (9 plays, 71 yards, 3:41)	WYO 14–3
2	09:28	WYO	Raghib Ismail Jr. 37–yard pass from Sean Chambers (Cooper Rothe kick) (5 plays, 42 yards, 3:18)	WYO 21–3
2	00:00	WYO	Cooper Rothe 20–yard field goal (6 plays, 92 yards, 0:50)	WYO 24–3
3	11:54	WYO	Jackson Marcotte 25–yard pass from Tyler Vander Waal (Cooper Rothe kick) (8 plays, 75 yards, 3:06)	WYO 31–3

Statistics	Nevada	Wyoming
First downs	17	22
Total yards	335	479
Rushing yards	81	258
Passing yards	254	221
Turnovers	4	1
Time of possession	30:14	29:46

Team	Category	Player	Statistics
Nevada	Passing	Carson Strong	26/40, 247 yards, 1 INT
Nevada	Rushing	Devonte Lee	3 carries, 38 yards
Nevada	Receiving	Romeo Doubs	5 receptions, 98 yards
Wyoming	Passing	Sean Chambers	6/9, 158 yards, 2 TDs, 1 INT
Wyoming	Rushing	Xazavian Valladay	26 carries, 206 yards
Wyoming	Receiving	Raghib Ismail Jr.	4 receptions, 93 yards, 1 TD

=== New Mexico ===
New Mexico at Nevada
(Battle of the Wolves)

Team	1	2	3	4	Total
Lobos	7	0	3	0	10
• Wolf Pack	0	14	0	7	21

- Date: November 2, 2019
- Location: Mackay Stadium
  Reno, NV
- Game start: 7:35 p.m. PDT
- Elapsed time: 3 hours and 15 minutes
- Game attendance: 15,631
- Game weather: Temperature: 55 °F (13 °C) • Weather: Clear • Wind: ESE 4 MPH
- Referee: Eddy Shelton
- TV announcers (ESPNU): Clay Matvick (play–by–play) and Ryan Leaf (analyst)

Scoring summary
1	06:48	NM	Ahmari Davis 4–yard run (Andrew Shelley kick) (9 plays, 90 yards, 3:29)	NM 7–0
2	07:50	NEV	Toa Taua 1–yard run (Brandon Talton kick) (15 plays, 80 yards, 8:12)	TIE 7–7
2	05:08	NEV	Romeo Doubs 57–yard pass from Carson Strong (Brandon Talton kick) (4 plays, 73 yards, 1:18)	NEV 14–7
3	11:14	NM	Andrew Shelley 49–yard field goal (8 plays, 43 yards, 3:46)	NEV 14–10
4	05:45	NEV	Elijah Cooks 20–yard pass from Carson Strong (Brandon Talton kick) (5 plays, 46 yards, 2:35)	NEV 21–10

Statistics	New Mexico	Nevada
First downs	17	21
Total yards	346	369
Rushing yards	109	64
Passing yards	237	305
Turnovers	2	1
Time of possession	25:15	34:45

Team	Category	Player	Statistics
New Mexico	Passing	Tevaka Tuioti	19/36, 237 yards
New Mexico	Rushing	Ahmari Davis	15 carries, 80 yards, 1 TD
New Mexico	Receiving	Marcus Williams	6 receptions, 74 yards
Nevada	Passing	Carson Strong	28/40, 305 yards, 2 TDs
Nevada	Rushing	Devonte Lee	9 carries, 68 yards
Nevada	Receiving	Romeo Doubs	11 receptions, 167 yards, 1 TD

=== At San Diego State ===
Nevada at San Diego State

Team	1	2	3	4	Total
• Wolf Pack	3	0	7	7	17
No. 24 Aztecs	0	3	7	3	13

- Date: November 9, 2019
- Location: SDCCU Stadium
  San Diego, CA
- Game start: 7:35 p.m. PST
- Elapsed time: 3 hours and 14 minutes
- Game attendance: 27,973
- Game weather: Temperature: 64 °F (18 °C) • Weather: Clear • Wind: Calm
- Referee: Mike Cuttone
- TV announcers (ESPN2): Clay Matvick (play–by–play) and Ryan Leaf (analyst)

Scoring summary
1	03:22	NEV	Brandon Talton 34–yard field goal (4 plays, 5 yards, 1:13)	NEV 3–0
2	13:15	SDSU	Matt Araiza 21–yard field goal (13 plays, 71 yards, 5:07)	TIE 3–3
3	07:12	NEV	Elijah Cooks 13–yard pass from Carson Strong (Brandon Talton kick) (16 plays, 75 yards, 7:48)	NEV 10–3
3	01:24	SDSU	Chance Bell 3–yard run (Matt Araiza kick) (14 plays, 71 yards, 5:40)	TIE 10–10
4	10:31	NEV	Devonte Lee 1–yard run (Brandon Talton kick) (5 plays, 55 yards, 2:02)	NEV 17–10
4	03:46	SDSU	Matt Araiza 44–yard field goal (11 plays, 42 yards, 4:00)	NEV 17–13

Statistics	Nevada	San Diego State
First downs	12	18
Total yards	226	309
Rushing yards	29	113
Passing yards	197	196
Turnovers	0	0
Time of possession	27:41	32:19

Team	Category	Player	Statistics
Nevada	Passing	Carson Strong	19/26, 147 yards, 1 TD, 1 INT
Nevada	Rushing	Toa Taua	12 carries, 19 yards
Nevada	Receiving	Brendan O'Leary–Orange	1 reception, 50 yards
San Diego State	Passing	Ryan Agnew	18/35, 196 yards, 1 INT
San Diego State	Rushing	Chance Bell	11 carries, 40 yards, 1 TD
San Diego State	Receiving	Kobe Smith	5 receptions, 40 yards

=== At Fresno State ===
Nevada at Fresno State

Team	1	2	3	4	Total
• Wolf Pack	14	0	14	7	35
Bulldogs	7	14	7	0	28

- Date: November 23, 2019
- Location: Bulldog Stadium
  Fresno, CA
- Game start: 7:35 p.m. PST
- Elapsed time: 3 hours and 27 minutes
- Game attendance: 32,303
- Game weather: Temperature: 57 °F (14 °C) • Weather: Clear • Wind: Calm
- Referee: Stephen Baron
- TV announcers (ESPN2): Mike Couzens (play–by–play) and Kirk Morrison (analyst)

Scoring summary
1	11:58	NEV	Elijah Cooks 29–yard pass from Carson Strong (Brandon Talton kick) (7 plays, 75 yards, 3:02)	NEV 7–0
1	02:14	NEV	Romeo Doubs 1–yard pass from Carson Strong (Brandon Talton kick) (9 plays, 63 yards, 4:11)	NEV 14–0
1	00:41	FS	Ronnie Rivers 34–yard pass from Jorge Reyna (Cesar Silva kick) (4 plays, 75 yards, 1:33)	NEV 14–7
2	07:27	FS	Keric Wheatfall 17–yard pass from Ben Wooldridge (Cesar Silva kick) (10 plays, 56 yards, 4:33)	TIE 14–14
2	05:16	FS	Emoryie Edwards 12–yard pass from Jorge Reyna (Cesar Silva kick) (5 plays, 25 yards, 2:03)	FS 21–14
3	10:20	FS	Derrion Grim 3–yard pass from Jorge Reyna (Cesar Silva kick) (9 plays, 75 yards, 4:40)	FS 28–14
3	07:27	NEV	Romeo Doubs 5–yard pass from Carson Strong (Brandon Talton kick) (7 plays, 75 yards, 2:47)	FS 28–21
3	01:49	NEV	Devonte Lee 25–yard run (Brandon Talton kick) (3 plays, 34 yards, 1:22)	TIE 28–28
4	00:12	NEV	Toa Taua 3–yard run (Brandon Talton kick) (4 plays, 25 yards, 1:20)	NEV 35–28

Statistics	Nevada	Fresno State
First downs	18	18
Total yards	408	331
Rushing yards	254	53
Passing yards	154	278
Turnovers	4	0
Time of possession	31:29	28:31

Team	Category	Player	Statistics
Nevada	Passing	Carson Strong	20/31, 154 yards, 3 TDs
Nevada	Rushing	Toa Taua	20 carries, 135 yards, 1 TD
Nevada	Receiving	Elijah Cooks	5 receptions, 60 yards, 1 TD
Fresno State	Passing	Jorge Reyna	27/37, 261 yards, 3 TDs, 1 INT
Fresno State	Rushing	Josh Hokit	7 carries, 32 yards
Fresno State	Receiving	Ronnie Rivers	7 receptions, 88 yards, 1 TD

=== UNLV ===
UNLV at Nevada
(Battle for the Fremont Cannon / Silver State Series)

Team	1	2	3	4	OT	Total
• Rebels	17	7	0	3	6	33
Wolf Pack	0	13	0	14	3	30

- Date: November 30, 2019
- Location: Mackay Stadium
  Reno, NV
- Game start: 12:08 p.m. PST
- Elapsed time: 3 hours and 19 minutes
- Game attendance: 16,683
- Game weather: Temperature: 29 °F (−2 °C) • Weather: Cool and Overcast • Wind: ESE 4 MPH
- Referee: Kevin Hassell
- TV announcers (AT&T RM): Drew Goodman (play–by–play), Sherdrick Bonner (analyst) and Brad Thompson (sideline)

Scoring summary
1	10:19	UNLV	Daniel Gutierrez 40–yard field goal (7 plays, 30 yards, 2:19)	UNLV 3–0
1	04:43	UNLV	Charles Williams 80–yard run (Daniel Gutierrez kick) (1 play, 80 yards, 0:10)	UNLV 10–0
1	01:38	UNLV	Mekhi Stevenson 32–yard pass from Kenyon Oblad (Daniel Gutierrez kick) (4 plays, 53 yards, 1:45)	UNLV 17–0
2	13:09	NEV	Devonte Lee 2–yard run (Spencer Pettit kick) (10 plays, 74 yards, 3:29)	UNLV 17–7
2	08:02	NEV	Brandon Talton 27–yard field goal (8 plays, 67 yards, 2:52)	UNLV 17–10
2	03:10	NEV	Brandon Talton 31–yard field goal (8 plays, 28 yards, 1:51)	UNLV 17–13
2	02:58	UNLV	Steve Jenkins 75–yard pass from Kenyon Oblad (Daniel Gutierrez kick) (1 play, 75 yards, 0:12)	UNLV 24–13
4	09:08	NEV	Daniel Gutierrez 50–yard field goal (6 plays, 35 yards, 2:33)	UNLV 27–13
4	06:47	NEV	Dominic Christian 24–yard pass from Carson Strong (Brandon Talton kick) (8 plays, 70 yards, 2:15)	UNLV 27–20
4	01:32	NEV	Devonte Lee 1–yard run (Brandon Talton kick) (10 plays, 75 yards, 3:45)	TIE 27–27
OT	15:00	NEV	Brandon Talton 42–yard field goal (4 plays, 0 yards, 0:00)	NEV 30–27
OT	15:00	UNLV	Steve Jenkins 19–yard pass from Kenyon Oblad (3 plays, 25 yards, 0:00)	UNLV 33–30

Statistics	UNLV	Nevada
First downs	15	28
Total yards	412	459
Rushing yards	183	108
Passing yards	229	351
Turnovers	0	1
Time of possession	25:13	34:37

Team	Category	Player	Statistics
UNLV	Passing	Kenyon Oblad	16/22, 229 yards, 3 TDs
UNLV	Rushing	Charles Williams	20 carries, 138 yards, 1 TD
UNLV	Receiving	Steve Jenkins	5 receptions, 140 yards, 2 TDs
Nevada	Passing	Carson Strong	33/54, 351 yards, 1 TD
Nevada	Rushing	Devonte Lee	11 carries, 44 yards, 2 TD
Nevada	Receiving	Elijah Cooks	12 receptions, 151 yards

=== Vs. Ohio (Famous Idaho Potato Bowl) ===
Nevada vs. Ohio
(Famous Idaho Potato Bowl)

Team	1	2	3	4	Total
• Bobcats	3	17	10	0	30
Wolf Pack	3	6	0	12	21

- Date: January 3, 2020
- Location: Albertsons Stadium
  Boise, ID
- Game start: 1:33 p.m. MST
- Elapsed time: 3 hours and 20 minutes
- Game attendance: 13,611
- Game weather: Temperature: 47 °F (8 °C) • Weather: Partly Cloudy • Wind: NNE 1 MPH
- Referee: Billy Williams
- TV announcers (ESPN): Bill Roth (play–by–play), John Congemi (analyst) and Kris Budden (sideline)

Scoring summary
1	12:26	NEV	Brandon Talton 51–yard field goal (6 plays, 46 yards, 2:34)	NEV 3–0
1	07:00	OHIO	Louie Zervos 29–yard field goal (10 plays, 65 yards, 5:20)	TIE 3–3
2	12:28	OHIO	Julian Ross 12–yard run (Louie Zervos kick) (15 plays, 71 yards, 7:47)	OHIO 10–3
2	07:21	NEV	Brandon Talton 36–yard field goal (10 plays, 59 yards, 5:00)	OHIO 10–6
2	06:21	OHIO	Nathan Rourke 35–yard run (Louie Zervos kick) (3 plays, 77 yards, 0:54)	OHIO 17–6
2	02:17	OHIO	Louie Zervos 33–yard field goal (5 plays, 20 yards, 2:02)	OHIO 20–6
2	00:00	NEV	Brandon Talton 33–yard field goal (12 plays, 67 yards, 2:12)	OHIO 20–9
3	11:00	OHIO	Louie Zervos 26–yard field goal (9 plays, 66 yards, 3:53)	OHIO 23–9
3	05:26	OHIO	De'Montre Tuggle 2–yard run (Louie Zervos kick) (5 plays, 50 yards, 2:26)	OHIO 30–9
4	10:48	NEV	Elijah Cooks 8–yard pass from Carson Strong (Brandon Talton kick blocked) (10 plays, 78 yards, 3:33)	OHIO 30–15
4	08:42	NEV	Devonte Lee 1–yard run (Carson Strong pass failed) (3 plays, 26 yards, 0:57)	OHIO 30–21

Statistics	Ohio	Nevada
First downs	25	24
Total yards	429	430
Rushing yards	285	29
Passing yards	144	401
Turnovers	4	4
Time of possession	33:13	26:47

Team	Category	Player	Statistics
Ohio	Passing	Nathan Rourke	9/17, 144 yards
Ohio	Rushing	De'Montre Tuggle	10 carries, 97 yards, 1 TD
Ohio	Receiving	Isiah Cox	3 receptions, 73 yards
Nevada	Passing	Carson Strong	31/49, 402 yards, 1 TD
Nevada	Rushing	Toa Taua	6 carries, 48 yards
Nevada	Receiving	Elijah Cooks	14 receptions, 197 yards, 1 TD
