= Malik Henry =

Malik Henry may refer to:

- Malik Henry (quarterback) (born 1998), American football quarterback
- Malik Henry (wide receiver) (born 1997), American football wide receiver
- Malik Henry (soccer) (born 2002), Canadian soccer player
- Malik Henry-Scott (born 2001), American soccer player
