= Malik Henry (quarterback) =

American gridiron football player (born 1998)

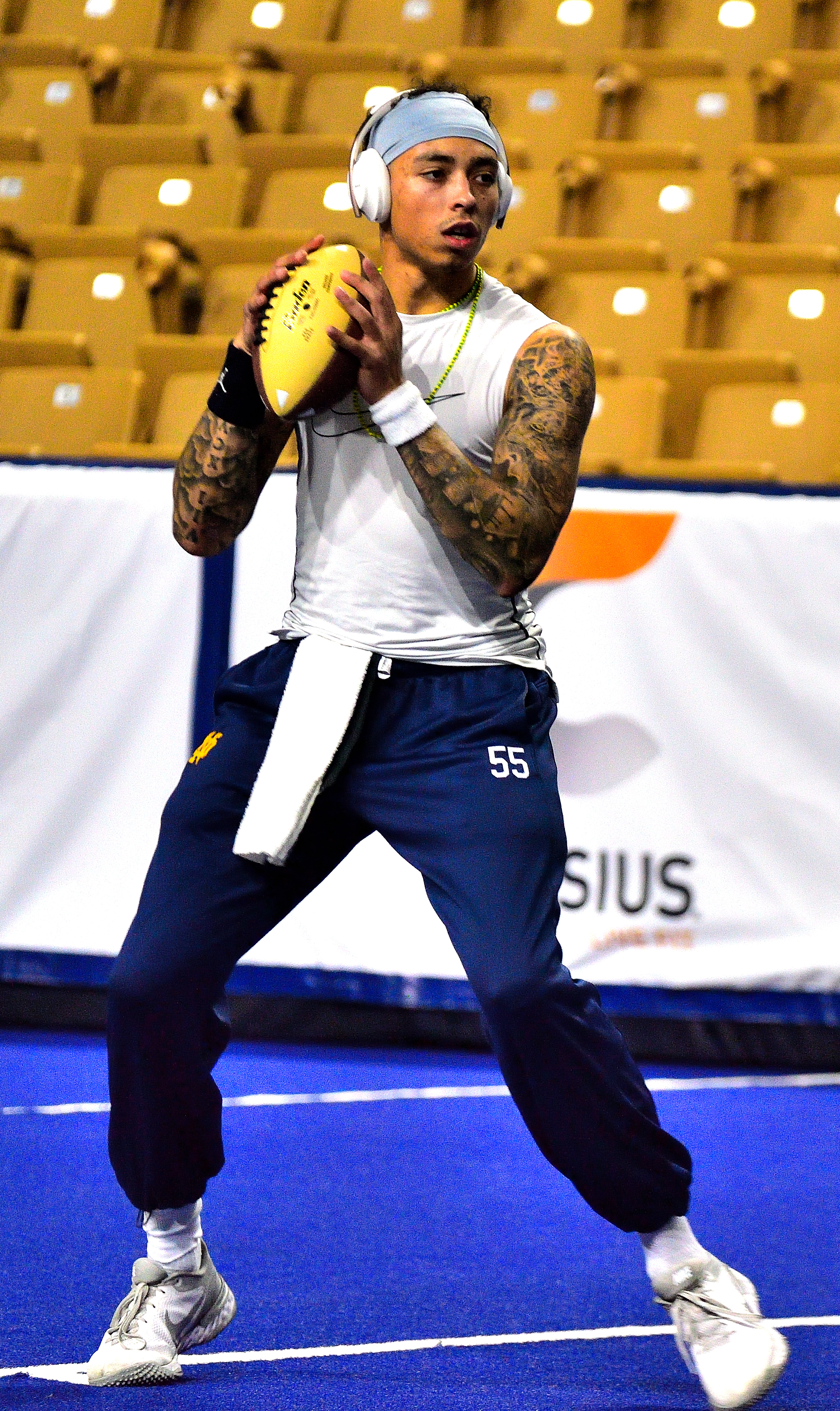
- Henry with the Frisco Fighters in 2021

No. 16 – Michigan Arsenal
- Position: Quarterback
- Roster status: Active

Personal information
- Born: July 7, 1998 (age 28); Inglewood, California, U.S.
- Listed height: 6 ft 2 in (1.88 m)
- Listed weight: 200 lb (91 kg)

Career information
- High school: Long Beach Polytechnic
- College: Florida State (2016); Independence (2017–2018); Nevada (2019)

Career history
- Frisco Fighters (2021); Jacksonville Sharks (2022); Carolina Cobras (2022–2023); Edmonton Elks (2024)*; Arizona Bandits (2025)*; San Antonio Gunslingers (2025); Billings Outlaws (2025); Michigan Arsenal (2026–present)
- * Offseason or practice squad member only

Malik Henry (born July 7, 1998) is an American professional football quarterback for the Michigan Arsenal of Arena Football One (AF1). He played college football for the Nevada Wolf Pack. Henry also played junior college for the Independence Pirates, where he is most recognized for appearing on the Netflix documentary series Last Chance U.

== Early life ==
Henry was a consensus four-star recruit that was rated as one of the nation's Top 60 prospects by ESPN, Rivals and 247Sports. He had an outstanding performance in the Under Armour All-America Game in January (2016) where he completed 9-of-12 passes for 75 yards and two touchdowns while leading Team Highlight to a 27–0 victory. Henry played his sophomore and junior years at Westlake High School, before finishing his prep career at Long Beach Poly in the fall of 2015. He threw for 1,410 yards, 16 touchdowns and just one interception over seven games during his senior year. Henry was the No. 2 dual-threat quarterback in the nation, No. 1 player from California and No. 17 overall prospect by ESPN. He was rated the nation's No. 2 dual-threat signal-caller, No. 7 player in California and No. 34 overall recruit by Rivals. Henry was ranked the No. 4 pro-style quarterback, No. 8 player in California and No. 53 player overall by 247Sports. He also competed in Nike's Elite 11 quarterback camp in the summer of 2015, coached by former Super Bowl-winning quarterback Trent Dilfer.

== College career ==
As a highly ranked, four-star prospect, Henry originally committed and enrolled at Florida State University to play for the Florida State Seminoles under head coach Jimbo Fisher. However, he was suspended for a violation of team rules.

In January 2017, he transferred to Independence Community College, where he played two seasons for the Independence Pirates. He saw action in twelve games and completed 151-of-288 of his passes for 1620 yards and eleven touchdowns, with eleven interceptions. The Netflix documentary series Last Chance U continued its third and fourth season at Independence Community College, where Henry was premiered as one of the stars of the show.

In December 2019, Henry walked on at the University of Nevada, where in three games for the Nevada Wolf Pack, he made two starts and threw for 593 yards — registering a touchdown and 4 interceptions — while completing 53.8 percent of his passes. Henry notched a career high of 352 yards through the air against the San Jose State Spartans, including a 75-yard pass for the Wolf Pack's longest play of the year. Over the course of the season, he also ran for seven yards on eleven carries.

== Professional career ==
=== Frisco Fighters ===
Henry began his professional career with the Frisco Fighters of Indoor Football League (IFL). He played one season, where he threw for 778 yards and 10 touchdowns in seven games.

=== Jacksonville Sharks ===
In 2022, Henry continued his career with the Jacksonville Sharks of the National Arena League (NAL). He was released by the Sharks on June 19, 2022.

=== Carolina Cobras ===
On June 29, 2022, he signed with the Carolina Cobras. On the season he appeared in nine total games, passing for 1,836 yards and 38 touchdowns.

In 2023, Henry's journey continued with the Cobras where he led the league in passing yards (3,116), passing touchdowns (60) and had an NAL record 10 touchdown passes in a game against the West Texas Warbirds. Henry led the Cobras to the NAL title game, where they lost 54–45 to the Jacksonville Sharks.

=== Edmonton Elks ===
On January 26, 2024, Henry signed with the Edmonton Elks of the Canadian Football League (CFL) under head coach Chris Jones. Prior to joining the Elks, Henry inked a contract with the Albany Firebirds of the Arena Football League, but overturned that opportunity in order to compete for a roster spot with the Elks. Coincidentally, Henry became teammates with wide receiver John Franklin III, who appeared in the first season of Last Chance U. He was released on June 3.

=== Arizona Bandits ===
On January 28, 2025, Henry signed with the Arizona Bandits of the Arena Football One (AF1). On March 8, the league announced that the Bandits would be unable to compete in the 2025 season. Henry was granted his free agency.

=== San Antonio Gunslingers ===
On March 12, 2025, Henry signed with the San Antonio Gunslingers of the Indoor Football League (IFL). Henry was released by San Antonio on April 23.

=== Billings Outlaws ===
On May 7, 2025, Henry signed with the Billings Outlaws of the Arena Football One (AF1).

=== Michigan Arsenal ===
On October 16, 2025, Henry signed with the Michigan Arsenal of the Arena Football One (AF1) for the 2026 season.

== Career statistics ==
=== Professional ===
Year	Team	League	Games			Passing									Rushing				
Year	Team	League	GP	GS	Record	Cmp	Att	Pct	Yds	Y/A	Lng	TD	Int	Rtg	Att	Yds	Avg	Lng	TD
2021	FRI	IFL	7	5	4–1	76	140	54.3	778	5.6	42	10	5	117.4	13	21	1.6	5	0
2022	JAX	NAL	5	5	1–4	91	158	57.6	1,027	6.5	40	23	10	90.0	2	1	0.5	1	1
2022	CAR	NAL	4	4	2–2	73	123	59.3	809	6.6	35	15	3	108.0	10	24	2.4	1	1
2023	CAR	NAL	14	14	10–4	258	371	69.5	3,116	8.4	48	60	11	122.0	34	286	5.5	26	7
2025	SA	IFL	4	4	1–3	58	97	59.8	596	6.1	39	11	5	138.5	10	17	1.7	6	1
2025	BIL	AF1	6	6	4–2	100	160	62.5	1,190	7.4	44	26	6	109.1	18	58	3.2	15	2
Career			40	38	22–16	656	1049	60.5	7,516	6.8	48	145	40	114.1	87	407	2.5	26	12

=== College ===
Season	Team	Games			Passing								Rushing			
Season	Team	GP	GS	Record	Cmp	Att	Pct	Yds	Y/A	TD	Int	Rtg	Att	Yds	Avg	TD
2016	Florida State	0	0	—	Redshirt											
2017	Independence CC	10	7	5–2	132	245	53.9	1,383	5.6	10	8	108.2	20	7	0.3	2
2018	Independence CC	2	1	0–1	19	43	44.2	237	5.5	1	3	84.2	0	0	0.0	0
2019	Nevada	3	2	1–1	42	78	53.8	593	7.6	1	4	111.7	11	7	0.6	0
Career		15	10	6–4	193	366	52.7	2,213	6.0	12	16	108.3	31	14	0.5	2
