= Tory Horton =

American football player (born 2002)

No. 15 – Seattle Seahawks
- Position: Wide receiver
- Roster status: Active

Personal information
- Born: November 29, 2002 (age 23); Fresno, California, U.S.
- Listed height: 6 ft 2 in (1.88 m)
- Listed weight: 196 lb (89 kg)

Career information
- High school: Washington Union (Fresno)
- College: Nevada (2020–2021); Colorado State (2022–2024)
- NFL draft: 2025: 5th round, 166th overall pick

Career history
- Seattle Seahawks (2025–present)

Awards and highlights
- Super Bowl champion (LX); 2× First-team All-MW (2022, 2023)

Career NFL statistics as of Week 10, 2026
- Receptions: 23
- Receiving yards: 276
- Receiving touchdowns: 6
- Return yards: 354
- Return touchdowns: 1
- Stats at Pro Football Reference

Tory Horton (born November 29, 2002) is an American professional football wide receiver for the Seattle Seahawks of the National Football League (NFL). He played college football for the Nevada Wolf Pack and Colorado State Rams. Horton was selected by the Seahawks in the fifth round of the 2025 NFL draft.

== Early life ==
Horton attended Washington Union High School in Fresno, California. In his high school career, Horton recorded 37 receptions for 821 yards and 15 touchdowns. Horton committed to play college football at the University of Nevada, Reno, over offers from Montana, Montana State, and Northern Colorado.

== College career ==
=== Nevada ===
As a freshman in 2020, Horton tallied 20 receptions for 336 yards and five touchdowns. In his first career start against Fresno State, he posted five receptions for 148 yards and three touchdowns. After a sophomore campaign in which he compiled 659 yards and five touchdowns on 52 receptions, Horton entered the transfer portal. Horton finished his tenure at Nevada with 72 receptions for 995 yards and ten touchdowns.

=== Colorado State ===
In December 2021, Horton announced that he would be transferring to Colorado State University. He began the 2022 season, with four touchdowns in the first four games of the season. Horton finished the season with 1,131 yards, eight touchdowns, and 71 receptions, being named to the First-team All-Mountain West. Entering the 2023 season, Horton was seen as a top wide receiver prospect in the 2024 NFL draft, and one of the best players in the Group of Five. In August 2023, Horton was named to the Biletnikoff Award watch list.

In 2024, Horton received a knee injury during the match between CSU and San Jose State University. The corrective surgery for the injury ended his season and college career. At the time, he was leading the Rams with 26 receptions and 353 receiving yards for the season. He ended up 35 yards short of the conference's total receiving yards record.

== Professional career ==
Pre-draft measurables
Height	Weight	Arm length	Hand span	Wingspan	40-yard dash	10-yard split	20-yard split	Vertical jump
6 ft 2 1/2 in (1.89 m)	196 lb (89 kg)	30 5/8 in (0.78 m)	9 in (0.23 m)	6 ft 5 in (1.96 m)	4.41 s	1.53 s	2.56 s	37.5 in (0.95 m)
All values from NFL Combine

=== 2025 season ===
Horton was selected by the Seattle Seahawks with the 166th pick in the fifth round of the 2025 NFL draft. In Week 2 against the Pittsburgh Steelers, Horton scored his first career touchdown on his first career catch, a 21-yard reception from Sam Darnold. On September 21, 2025, Horton broke a Seahawks franchise record for the longest punt return touchdown in team history at 95 yards during a Week 3 game against the New Orleans Saints. He is also the only player in NFL history with multiple receiving touchdowns and a punt return touchdown within the first three weeks of an NFL season. On November 22, Horton was placed on injured reserve due to a shin injury that had caused him to miss Seattle's previous two games. He finished his rookie season with 13 receptions for 161 yards and five touchdowns in eight games. Horton won his first Super Bowl title when the Seahawks defeated the New England Patriots in Super Bowl LX.

=== 2026 season ===
In Week 10 against the Las Vegas Raiders, with 2:04 left in the game and the Seahawks receiving the ball, Raiders kicker Matt Gay kicked the ball into the end zone intending for it to be a touchback. Before the ball went out of the end zone, however, Horton batted the ball back into the end zone, making the play alive. Rashid Shaheed then picked up the ball and ran the clock down five seconds, passing the two-minute warning. If a touchback occurred, the Raiders would have their two timeouts and the two-minute warning. However, since the ball managed to stay live because of that block, the clock ran past the two-minute warning and the Raiders could not use it. The Seahawks ultimately won the game 21–13, with the play being praised by both commentators and head coach Mike MacDonald. For that play, Horton was named NFC Special Teams Player of the Week.

== Career statistics ==
=== NFL ===
Year	Team	Games		Receiving					Punt returns					Fumbles	
Year	Team	GP	GS	Rec	Yds	Avg	Lng	TD	Ret	Yds	Avg	Lng	TD	Fum	Lost
2025	SEA	8	3	13	161	12.4	25	5	16	238	14.9	95	1	0	0
2026	SEA	9	1	10	115	11.5	17	1	5	27	5.4	13	0	0	0
Career		17	4	23	276	12.0	25	6	21	265	12.6	95	1	0	0

=== College ===
Year	Team	GP	Receiving			
Year	Team	GP	Rec	Yds	Avg	TD
2020	Nevada	9	20	336	16.8	5
2021	Nevada	12	52	659	12.7	5
2022	Colorado State	12	71	1,131	15.9	8
2023	Colorado State	12	96	1,136	11.8	8
2024	Colorado State	5	26	353	13.6	1
Career		50	265	3,615	13.6	27
