= Freddie Banks (American football) =

American football player and coach (born 1988)

Current position
- Title: Assistant head coach & defensive backs coach
- Team: Wake Forest
- Conference: ACC

Biographical details
- Born: July 4, 1988 (age 38); Harvey, Illinois, U.S.
- Education: North Dakota State

Playing career
- 2006: Mercyhurst
- 2007–2010: North Dakota State
- Position: Cornerback

Coaching career (HC unless noted)
- 2011–2012: MN State–Moorhead (DC/DB)
- 2013–2014: Nicholls State (DB)
- 2015: Livonia HS (Louisiana) (DC)
- 2016–2018: Midwestern State (DB/RC)
- 2018–2019: Stephen F. Austin (DB)
- 2020: Nevada (DB)
- 2021: Montana State (DC)
- 2022–2024: Colorado State (DC)
- 2025-present: Wake Forest (AHC/DB Coach)

Freddie Banks (born July 4, 1988) is an American college football coach. He played college football at North Dakota State.

== Playing career ==
Banks graduated from Thornwood High School in South Holland, Illinois in 2006. As a college freshman in 2006, Banks played as a cornerback at NCAA Division II Mercyhurst. He recorded 33 total tackles, one interception and one forced fumble in his single season at Mercyhurst. Banks transferred to North Dakota State following the 2006 season and sat out the 2007 season as a redshirt. He played in all eleven games at cornerback during the 2008 season as part of a defense that led the NCAA Division I FCS in pass defense. He saw limited playing time in 2009 before starting 12 games for the team in 2010, his senior season. He recorded 48 tackles, an interception and six pass breakups as part of North Dakota State's first ever NCAA Division I FCS playoff team.

== Coaching career ==
Banks' coaching career began at NCAA Division II Minnesota State–Moorhead, where he coached defensive backs, eventually rising to the role of defensive coordinator. After two seasons at Minnesota State–Moorhead, Banks was hired as the defensive backs coach for Nicholls State, where he remained for two years. He then spent a year as defensive coordinator for Livonia High School in Livonia, Louisiana, before spending three seasons at NCAA Division II Midwestern State as defensive backs coach and recruiting coordinator.

Banks served as the defensive backs coach at Stephen F. Austin for the 2018 and 2019 seasons before being hired as Nevada's new defensive backs coach in 2020. He was hired by Montana State as defensive coordinator the following year, and helped lead the team to an appearance in the 2022 NCAA Division I Football Championship Game.

In 2022, Banks was hired as Colorado State's new defensive coordinator. He had previously coached under Colorado State's head coach Jay Norvell when both were at Nevada in 2020.

== Personal life ==
Banks is Married with two children
