= Michigan Arsenal =

American indoor football team

Logo

General information
- Founded: 2025
- Headquartered: Saginaw, Michigan
- Colors: Silver, Red, Black
- MichiganArsenal.com

Personnel
- CEO: George Bradford
- Head coach: Tom Menas

Team history
- Michigan Arsenal (2026–present)

Home fields
- Dow Event Center (2026–present)

League / conference affiliations
- Arena Football One (2026–present)

The Michigan Arsenal are a professional arena football team based in Saginaw, Michigan, that competes in Arena Football One (AF1). The team plays its home games at Dow Event Center.

== History ==
=== Arena Football One (2026) ===
On June 27, 2025, AF1 commissioner Jeff Fisher stated in an interview that AF1 planned on adding two expansion teams in Ohio and Michigan that will begin play in the 2026 season, but that which cities those teams would represent were still being finalized. On October 15, 2025, the league announced that the Michigan team would be called the Michigan Arsenal and that the team would play their home games at the Dow Event Center in Saginaw. It would be the first team to play in Saginaw since the Saginaw Sting of various leagues and the first major arena football team to play in the state of Michigan since the Detroit Drive, Grand Rapids Rampage and Detroit Fury, all of the original Arena Football League.
