= Fred Guidici =

American football coach (born 1964)

Biographical details
- Born: November 8, 1964 (age 61); Omaha, Nebraska, U.S.
- Education: San Jose State

Coaching career (HC unless noted)
- 1984–1989: Blackford HS (CA) (OL/DL/ST)
- 1990–1992: Santa Clara (DL/OLB/ST)
- 1993–1994: Stanford (QC)
- 1995: Oakland Raiders (QC)
- 1996–1998: San Jose SaberCats (OL/DL)
- 1996–2008: Menlo (ST/TE)
- 2009–2011: Menlo
- 2012–2014: San Jose State (ST/RB)
- 2015: San Jose SaberCats (OL/DL/ST)
- 2015–2016: San Mateo (ST)
- 2017–2022: San Jose State (ST)
- 2023–2025: Stanford (ST)
- 2026–present: San Jose State (ST)

Accomplishments and honors

Championships
- ArenaBowl (2015)

Fred Guidici (born November 8, 1964) is an American football coach. He is the special teams coordinator at San Jose State University for the third time. Guidici was the senior special teams quality control analyst for Stanford University, in 2023 and 2024 and became the Special Teams Coordinator in 2025. Guidici served as the head football coach at Menlo College in Atherton, California from 2009 to 2011.

== Head coaching record ==
Year	Team	Overall	Conference	Standing	Bowl/playoffs
Menlo Oaks (Northwest Conference) (2009)
2009	Menlo	4–6	3–3	T–3rd	
Menlo Oaks (NAIA independent) (2010–2011)
2010	Menlo	4–7			
2011	Menlo	5–5			
Menlo:		13–18	3–3		
Total:		86–65			
