= Tre Walker =

American football player (born October 28, 1999)

Profile
- Position: Wide receiver

Personal information
- Born: November 28, 1999 (age 26); Compton, California, U.S.
- Listed height: 5 ft 11 in (1.80 m)
- Listed weight: 180 lb (82 kg)

Career information
- High school: Narbonne HS (Los Angeles, California)
- College: San Jose State (2017–2020)
- NFL draft: 2021: undrafted

Career history
- Buffalo Bills (2021)*; Pittsburgh Maulers (2022–2023)
- * Offseason or practice squad member only

Tre Walker (born October 28, 1999) is an American former professional football wide receiver. He played college football for the San Jose State Spartans.

== Early life ==
Walker attended high school at Narbonne High School. In 2016 he was named Los Angeles City Division I Offensive Player of the Year and Marine League Co-Offensive Player of the Year. Coming out of high school he was a three star recruit and had offers from Idaho, Boise State, Florida Atlantic and San Jose State. He committed to play for San Jose State in February 2017.

== College ==
Walker played college football for the San Jose State Spartans. In his first season, he played in eleven games, starting in four, and recorded 26 receptions and one touchdown. In his sophomore year, he played in nine games, starting in three, and had 39 receptions and five touchdowns.

As a junior, Walker played in ten games, all starts, and caught 79 passes while scoring two touchdowns. He was selected first-team All-Mountain West Conference (MW) for his performance. In his senior year, he had 45 receptions and four touchdowns, earning second-team All-Mountain West honors.

After his senior year, Walker transferred to play for Mississippi State, but was ruled ineligible to compete in the Southeastern Conference. The SEC had a rule that required transferring athletes to have two years of eligibility or to have graduated. Walker did not meet either and thus was not eligible to play.

== Professional career ==
Walker went unselected in the 2021 NFL draft. He signed as an undrafted free agent with the Buffalo Bills. In May 2021 he was waived to make room for wide receiver Lance Lenoir.

He was chosen in the 2022 USFL draft in the 17th round by the Pittsburgh Maulers. He played in the 2022 USFL season and 2023 USFL season for the Maulers. He re-signed for the 2024 season but the Maulers folded following the USFL and XFL merger.
