= Tommy Perry =

American football player and coach (born 1980)

Current position
- Title: Special teams coordinator
- Team: South Alabama
- Conference: Sun Belt

Biographical details
- Born: August 29, 1980 (age 46); Monroe, Louisiana, U.S.
- Education: Texas A&M University (2003); Texas A&M University–Commerce (2005)

Playing career
- 2000–2001: Tyler Junior College
- 2002–2003: Texas A&M
- Position: Linebacker

Coaching career (HC unless noted)
- 2004: Texas (Asst. S&C)
- 2005: Texas A&M–Commerce (STC/RB)
- 2006 (Spring): Amsterdam Admirals (STC/S&C)
- 2006–2008: Alabama (GA)
- 2009–2012: South Alabama (STC/RB)
- 2013–2016: North Texas (STC/RB)
- 2017–2019: Nevada (STC)
- 2020–2021: UTSA (STC)
- 2022–2025: Colorado State (STC)
- 2026–present: South Alabama (STC)

Thomas Richardson Perry (born August 29, 1980) is an American football coach and former player. He is currently the special teams coordinator at the University of South Alabama. He has also coordinated special teams at Texas A&M University-Commerce, the University of Nevada, Reno, the University of Texas at San Antonio and Colorado State University.

== Coaching career ==
=== 2004–2008 ===
Following Perry's playing career, he served as an assistant strength and conditioning coach at Texas in 2004. During that time, he also served as an academic advisor for the program.

The following season, Perry joined the staff at Texas A&M-Commerce as the special teams coordinator and running backs coach.

Perry spent the spring of 2006 in Europe, as the special teams coordinator and head strength coach for the Amsterdam Admirals of NFL Europe. Perry then joined Mike Shula’s Alabama staff as a graduate assistant. He stayed on staff when Nick Saban took the program over in 2007. In 2008, Alabama was undefeated in the regular season, and reached the SEC Championship game.

=== South Alabama ===
From 2009 to 2012, Perry served as the special teams coordinator and running backs coach for South Alabama. During this period, South Alabama was transitioning to Division I FBS. In 2012, South Alabama's first season as a full-member FBS team, Kicker Michel Chapuseaux set the school record for scoring with 84 points.

=== North Texas ===
In 2013, Perry went to North Texas as the special teams coordinator and running backs coach. With the assistance of excellent drill dot placement by first year graduate assistant Daniel Holland, he did a complete transformation of the Mean Green special teams unit when he arrived in 2013 and the results were evident. In the 2014 season the Mean Green placekicker hit 15-of-17 field goal attempts, setting a school record with his conversion rate of 88.2. Perry's kickoff return defense was fifth in the nation in 2014, holding its opponents to only 16.4 yards per return. Additionally the Mean Green's punter finished the season with the second-highest punting average in Conference-USA at 44.8 yards per kick.

In Perry's first season with North Texas, the team led the nation with eight blocked kicks, including five blocked punts, which also led the nation. Of those five blocked punts, three resulted in touchdowns. Perry's impact on special teams was also felt on the return game as the top returner averaged 27.6 yards per kick return, which included a 99-yard touchdown return against No. 9 Georgia.

The North Texas running backs also thrived under Perry in 2013. Former Mean Green back Brandin Byrd posted his first 1,000-yard rushing season and two of the top-10 longest rushes in school history. North Texas as a team rushed for 31 touchdowns that year, the second-most in school history and most since 1951.

=== Nevada ===
Perry was the special teams coordinator for Jay Norvell at Nevada from 2017 to 2019. In his first season at the helm of Nevada's special teams, the Wolf Pack ranked fourth in the Mountain West Conference in both kickoff return (22.1) and punt return (10.0) average. Daiyan Henley's 23.1 yards-per-return average on kickoffs ranked inside the top 50 nationally and was sixth in the league.

In Perry's second year, Nevada improved its punt return game from 10.0 yards per return to 12.59 yards per return, which ranked second in the Mountain West and 24th nationally. A big reason for the increase in punt return success was rookie Romeo Doubs, who returned a punt against Portland State 80 yards for a touchdown on his first collegiate touch. Perry also worked with punter Quinton Conaway, who averaged 43.6 yards per punt, which ranked in the top five in the league and in the top 30 nationally. Conaway also booted a 74-yard punt in 2018, which was tied for the 12th longest punt of the season across the nation.

In 2019, he helped the Wolf Pack to seven wins, including an upset of Purdue, and their second straight bowl game. Nevada punter Quinton Conaway posted an average of 43.0 yards per punt with a long of 67 and he pinned opponents inside the 20-yard line 16 times. Place-kicker Brandon Talton booted 21 of 25 field goals with a long of 56 and he ranked 18th nationally in field goals per game and 26th in field-goal percentage (.840).

=== UTSA ===
In January 2020, it was announced that Perry would join Jeff Traylor’s new staff at UTSA as the special teams coordinator for the program.

=== Colorado State ===
In January 2022, it was reported the Perry would re-unite with Norvell, joining the Colorado State staff as the special teams coordinator.

=== South Alabama (second stint) ===
On January 20, 2026, Perry was hired as the special teams coordinator for the South Alabama Jaguars.

== Playing career ==
Perry played Linebacker at Tyler Junior College in 2000 and 2001 prior to transferring and playing at Texas A&M for two seasons in 2002 and 2003. While at A&M, Perry played linebacker, Defensive end, and Fullback He also played on multiple special teams.

== Personal life ==
Perry has two daughters; Joanna Rose and Jude.

Perry is the grandson of Texas A&M's 1957 Heisman Trophy winner John David Crow.
