= 2019 Utah State Aggies football team =

American college football season

2019 Utah State Aggies football

Frisco Bowl, L 41–51 vs. Kent State
- Conference: Mountain West Conference
- Mountain Division
- Record: 7–6 (6–2 MW)
- Head coach: Gary Andersen (5th season)
- Offensive coordinator: Mike Sanford Jr. (1st season)
- Offensive scheme: Spread
- Defensive coordinator: Justin Ena (1st season)
- Base defense: 4–2–5
- Home stadium: Maverik Stadium

Uniform
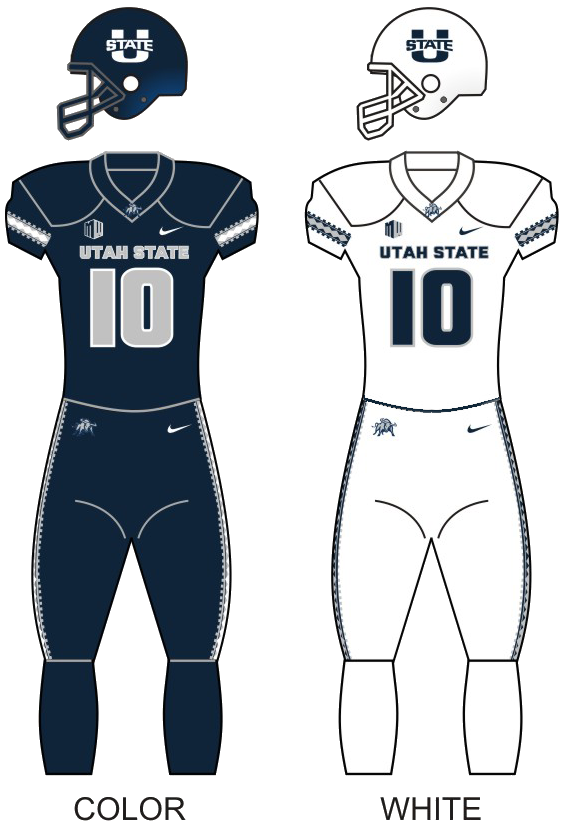

2019 Mountain West Conference football standings
	Conf.			Overall
Team	W		L	W		L
Mountain Division
No. 23 Boise State xy$	8	–	0	12	–	2
No. 22 Air Force	7	–	1	11	–	2
Utah State	6	–	2	7	–	6
Wyoming	4	–	4	8	–	5
Colorado State	3	–	5	4	–	8
New Mexico	0	–	8	2	–	10
West Division
Hawaii xy	5	–	3	10	–	5
San Diego State x	5	–	3	10	–	3
Nevada	4	–	4	7	–	6
San Jose State	2	–	6	5	–	7
UNLV	2	–	6	4	–	8
Fresno State	2	–	6	4	–	8
Championship: Boise State 31, Hawaii 10
$ – Conference champion; x – Division champion/co-champions; y – Championship game participant; Rankings from AP Poll

The 2019 Utah State Aggies football team represented Utah State University in the 2019 NCAA Division I FBS football season. The Aggies were led by head coach Gary Andersen in his fifth overall season, although first season after taking over as the program's head coach for the second time. The team played their home games at Maverik Stadium, and competed as members of the Mountain Division of the Mountain West Conference.

== Preseason ==
=== Award watch lists ===
Utah State had five players placed on eleven different award watch lists heading into the 2019 season.

Award	Player	Position	Year
Maxwell Award	Jordan Love	QB	JR
Walter Camp Award	Jordan Love	QB	JR
Davey O'Brien Award	Jordan Love	QB	JR
Lou Groza Award	Dominik Eberle	PK	SR
Wuerffel Trophy	Dominik Eberle	PK	SR
Bednarik Award	Tipa Galeai	DL	SR
Bednarik Award	David Woodward	LB	JR
Butkus Award	David Woodward	LB	JR
Nagurski Award	David Woodward	LB	JR
Lott Trophy	David Woodward	LB	JR
Thorpe Award	DJ Williams	CB	SR

=== Preseason All-Americans ===
Utah State had three players named as preseason All-Americans by various publications.

Player	Position	Year	Publication(s)
Savon Scarver	KR	JR	Sporting News, Athlon Sports, Phil Steele
David Woodward	LB	JR	Athlon Sports, Phil Steele
Dominik Eberle	PK	SR	Athlon Sports

=== Mountain West media days ===
Mountain West Media Days were held on July 23–24 at the Green Valley Ranch resort in the Las Vegas suburb of Henderson, Nevada.

==== Media poll ====
In the preseason media poll, the Aggies were predicted to finish second in the Mountain Division.

==== Preseason All-Mountain West Team ====
Jordan Love was selected as the Preseason Offensive Player of the Year at MWC Media Days. Utah State had four additional players selected to the preseason all-Mountain West team.

Player	Position	Year
Jordan Love	QB	JR
Tipa Galeai	DL	SR
David Woodward	LB	JR
DJ Williams	CB	SR
Savon Scarver	KR	JR

== Personnel ==
=== Coaching staff ===
The 2019 Aggie coaching staff included ten new coaches as a result of Matt Wells' departure and the subsequent rehiring of Gary Andersen. Only Frank Maile and Stacy Collins remained from the previous staff. Of the ten new coaches, two had previous experience at Utah State (Gary Andersen and TJ Woods), and two were former Aggie football players (Keegan Andersen and Bojay Filimoeatu).

Name	Position	Alma mater	Joined staff
Gary Andersen	Head coach	Utah (1986)	2019 (previously 2009–2012)
Frank Maile	Assistant head coach / tight ends	Utah State (2007)	2016 (previously 2009–2013)
Mike Sanford	Offensive coordinator / quarterbacks	Boise State (2004)	2019
Justin Ena	Defensive coordinator / Inside Linebackers	BYU (2001)	2019
TJ Woods	Offensive line	Azusa Pacific (2002)	2019 (previously 2009–2012)
Stacy Collins	Special teams coordinator / running backs	Western Oregon (1998)	2016
Jason Phillips	Pass game coordinator / wide receivers	Houston (2001)	2019
Bojay Filimoeatu	Defensive ends	Utah State (2012)	2019
Mike Caputo	Safeties	Wisconsin (2015)	2019
Mark Orphey	Cornerbacks	Texas Southern (2010)	2019
Jordan Hicks	Strength and Conditioning	Georgetown (KY) (2005)	2019
Keegan Andersen	Director of player personnel	Utah State (2013)	2019

=== Roster ===
Source: 2019 Fall Camp Football Roster

2019 Utah State Aggies football
Quarterback: 3 Henry Colombi – (redshirt) sophomore (6'2, 200); 5 Cooper Legas – freshman (6'2, 210); 6 Andrew Peasley – (redshirt) freshman (6'2, 200); 7 Josh Calvin – freshman (6'3, 190); 10 Jordan Love (S) – (redshirt) junior (6'4, 220); Running back: 1 Gerold Bright – (redshirt) senior (5'10, 190); 20 Jaylen Warren – junior (5'7, 200); 26 Chase Nelson – (redshirt) junior (5'10, 200); 27 Enoch Nawahine – freshman (5'11, 185); 29 Pallate Makakona – sophomore (5'10, 200); 32 Sione Fehoko – (redshirt) sophomore (5'7, 195); 34 Riley Burt – (redshirt) senior (6'1, 210); Wide receiver: 11 Savon Scarver – junior (5'11, 190); 12 Ajani Carter – freshman (6'1, 185); 13 Deven Thompkins – sophomore (5'7, 160); 14 Sean Carter – junior (6'4, 195); 16 Jordan Nathan (S) – (redshirt) junior (5'8, 180); 17 Taylor Compton – junior (5'8, 175); 18 Cam Lampkin – freshman (5'11, 165); 19 Kyle Van Leeuwen – freshman (5'9, 175); 80 Siaosi Mariner – (redshirt) senior (6'2, 190); 81 Tim Patrick Jr. – (redshirt) freshman (6'0, 190); 82 Sawyer Merrill – freshman (6'1, 170); 83 Derek Wright – junior (6'1, 195); Kanen Eaton – freshman (6'4, 180); Tight end: 43 Jack Drews – freshman (6'3, 230); 47 Logan Lee – (redshirt) junior (6'4, 250); 85 Mosese Manu – junior (6'3, 260); 86 Bryce Mortenson – (redshirt) freshman (6'6, 245); 87 Caleb Repp – (redshirt) senior (6'5, 230); 88 Carson Terrell – junior (6'5, 245); 89 Travis Boman – (redshirt) junior (6'4, 245); Kicker/Punter: 49 Pierce Callister – P – freshman (6'0, 170); 59 Connor Coles – K – (redshirt) sophomore (6'0, 190); 62 Dominik Eberle – K (S) – (redshirt) senior (6'2, 195); 89 Aaron Dalton – P – (redshirt) senior (6'4, 210); 98 Christopher Bartolic – P – freshman (6'0, 190)	Offensive line: 58 Demytrick Ali'ifua – (redshirt) junior (6'3, 315); 59 Aric Davison – freshman (6'3, 295); 60 Wyatt Bowles – (redshirt) freshman (6'5, 300); 63 Ashton Adams – freshman (6'4, 300); 64 Heneli Avendano – (redshirt) freshman (6'3, 300); 65 Karter Shaw – (redshirt) freshman (6'4, 300); 66 Mohelia Uasike – (redshirt) junior (6'1, 305); 67 Sione Lasike – freshman (6'1, 285); 68 Logan Wood – freshman (6'1, 280); 70 Hunter Hill – freshman (6'5, 285); 72 Alfred Edwards (S) – (redshirt) sophomore (6'7, 310); 75 Kyler Hack – (redshirt) sophomore (6'4, 300); 74 Chandler Dolphin – (redshirt) sophomore (6'3, 300); 75 Ty Shaw – (redshirt) junior (6'4, 300); 76 Jackson Owens – freshman (6'5, 290); 77 Andy Koch – (redshirt) freshman (6'6, 275); 78 Jacob South – (redshirt) freshman (6'6, 295); 79 Wade Meacham – (redshirt) freshman (6'6, 305); Defensive end: 10 Tipa Galeai (S) – (redshirt) senior (6'5, 230); 24 Dalton Baker – (redshirt) senior (6'5, 260); 41 Elijah Shelton – (redshirt) freshman (6'1, 230); 44 Fua Leilua (S) – (redshirt) senior (6'3, 305); 45 Jaylon Bannerman – (redshirt) junior (6'5, 240); 46 Addison Trupp – freshman (6'3, 215); 47 Kaleo Neves – freshman (6'2, 215); 51 Justus Te'i – (redshirt) junior (6'3, 240); 53 Braden Harris – (redshirt) senior (6'2, 230); 61 Aaron Bredsguard – freshman (6'3, 225); 91 Devon Anderson (S) – (redshirt) senior (6'2, 290); 92 Hale Motu'apuaka – (redshirt) freshman (6'2, 295); 93 Jacoby Wildman – (redshirt) senior (6'2, 265); 94 Caden Andersen – (redshirt) junior (6'2, 285); 97 Jake Pitcher – (redshirt) junior (6'3, 260); 98 AJ Vongphachanh – freshman (6'3, 230); Defensive tackle: 54 Dean Rice – freshman (6'4, 280); 55 Christian Lavalle – freshman (5'11, 225); 90 Ritisoni Fata – (redshirt) junior (6'1, 295); 96 Christopher 'Unga (S) – (redshirt) senior (6'0, 300); 98 Diamond Faamafoe – freshman (6'0, 295); 99 Josh Bowcut – freshman (6'5, 280)	Linebacker: 9 David Woodward (S) – (redshirt) Junior (6'2, 230); 15 Simon Thompson – freshman (6'3, 210); 33 Kevin Meitzenheimer – (redshirt) junior (6'0, 230); 34 Daniel Langi – (redshirt) sophomore (6'0, 230); 38 Eric Munoz – (redshirt) junior (6'0, 230); 39 Maika Magalei – (redshirt) sophomore (6'1, 230); 40 Dustin Matthews – (redshirt) freshman (6'1, 225); 42 Jaymason Willingham – freshman (6'3, 215); 52 Ethan Vowles – sophomore (6'2, 190); 54 Noah Young – sophomore (6'3, 225); Cornerback: 6 Cameron Haney – (redshirt) senior (5'10, 185); 7 DJ Williams (S) – (redshirt) senior (5'9, 180); 14 Zahodri Jackson – (redshirt) sophomore (5'10, 185); 21 Andre Grayson – (redshirt) sophomore (5'8, 165); 22 Michael Anyanwu – (redshirt) freshman (5'9, 180); 23 Dominic Tatum – freshman (6'2, 180); 25 Jarrod Green – (redshirt) sophomore (5'11, 180); 36 Jared Reed – (redshirt) sophomore (6'0, 180); Safety: 3 Troy Lefeged Jr. – junior (5'11, 190); 4 Shaq Bond (S) – junior (5'10, 190); 5 Cash Gilliam – (redshirt) junior (5'11, 195); 8 Braxton Gunther – (redshirt) junior (5'10, 185); 20 Keith Harris – freshman (5'11, 170); 28 Oakley Hussey – freshman (6'3, 200); 30 Patrick Maddox – (redshirt) sophomore (5'10, 205); 32 Matthew Sterzer – freshman (6'2, 225); 37 Sam Lockett – (redshirt) freshman (6'0, 195); Deep Snapper: 50 Jesse Vasquez – freshman (6'1, 225); 57 Brandon Pada (S) – (redshirt) junior (5'10, 210); Legend: (C) Team captain; (S) 2018 Starter; Injured; Redshirt

=== Depth chart ===
Defense

NKL
DJ Williams
Andre Grayson

FS
Shaq Bond
Braxton Gunther

ILB	ILB
Kevin Meitzenheimer	David Woodward
Eric Munoz	Maika Magalei

SS
Troy Lefeged
Cash Gilliam

CB
Zahodri Jackson
Dominic Tatum

DE	DT	DT	DE
Justus Te'i	Fua Leilua	Devon Anderson	Tipa Galeai
Dalton Baker	Chris Unga	Jacoby Wildman	Elijah Shelton

CB
Cameron Haney
Jarrod Green

Offense

Z-WR
Savon Scarver
Derek Wright

H-WR
Taylor Compton
Deven Thompkins

LT	LG	C	RG	RT
Alfred Edwards	Ty Shaw	Demytrick Ali'ifua	Karter Shaw	Andy Koch
Andy Koch	Wyatt Bowles	Heneli Avendano	Kyler Hack	Jacob South

TE
Carson Terrell
Travis Boman

X-WR
Jordan Nathan
Deven Thompkins

QB
Jordan Love
Henry Colombi

Special teams
PK Dominik Eberle
PK Connor Coles
P Aaron Dalton
P Christopher Bartolic
KR Savon Scarver
PR Jordan Nathan
LS Brandon Pada
H Aaron Dalton

RB
Gerold Bright
Enoch Nawahine

== Schedule ==
Date	Time	Opponent	Site	TV	Result	Attendance
August 30	6:00 p.m.	at Wake Forest*	BB&T Field; Winston-Salem, NC	ACCN	L 35–38	29,027
September 7	5:30 p.m.	Stony Brook*	Maverik Stadium; Logan, UT	Stadium on Facebook	W 62–7	22,247
September 21	8:30 p.m.	at San Diego State	SDCCU Stadium; San Diego, CA	CBSSN	W 23–17	27,367
September 28	5:30 p.m.	Colorado State^{†}	Maverik Stadium; Logan, UT	CBSSN	W 34–24	20,017
October 5	10:00 a.m.	at No. 5 LSU*	Tiger Stadium; Baton Rouge, LA	SECN	L 6–42	100,266
October 19	8:15 p.m.	Nevada	Maverik Stadium; Logan, UT	ESPNU	W 36–10	15,240
October 26	8:15 p.m.	at Air Force	Falcon Stadium; Colorado Springs, CO	ESPN2	L 7–31	19,248
November 2	8:00 p.m.	BYU*	Maverik Stadium; Logan, UT	ESPN2	L 14–42	25,472
November 9	5:00 p.m.	at Fresno State	Bulldog Stadium; Fresno, CA	CBSSN	W 37–35	32,037
November 16	2:00 p.m.	Wyoming	Maverik Stadium; Logan, UT	ESPNU	W 26–21	16,304
November 23	8:30 p.m.	No. 20 Boise State	Maverik Stadium; Logan, UT	CBSSN	L 21–56	18,315
November 30	2:00 p.m.	at New Mexico	Dreamstyle Stadium; Albuquerque, NM	Stadium on Facebook	W 38–25	11,611
December 20	5:30 p.m.	vs. Kent State*	Toyota Stadium; Frisco, TX (Frisco Bowl)	ESPN2	L 41–51	12,120
*Non-conference game; ^{†}Homecoming; Rankings from AP Poll released prior to the game; All times are in Mountain time

== Game summaries ==
=== At Wake Forest ===
Utah State Aggies at Wake Forest Demon Deacons

Quarter	1	2	3	4	Total
Aggies	7	14	7	7	35
Demon Deacons	10	7	14	7	38

at BB&T Field, Winston-Salem, NC

- Date: August 30, 2019
- Game time: 6:00 p.m. MDT
- Game weather: Temperature: 83 • Wind: 1 mph ESE • Weather: Sunny
- Game attendance: 29,027
- TV announcers (ACC Network): Kevin Brown, Andre Ware, and Jerry Punch
- USU Game Notes

Game information

First Quarter

- (11:54) Wake – Sage Surratt 22 yard pass from Jamie Newman, Sciba kick
  Wake 7–0; 8 plays, 75 yards, 3:06
- (9:23) USU – Gerold Bright 7 yard run, Dominik Eberle kick
  TIE 7–7; 8 plays, 75 yards, 2:31
- (0:23) Wake – Nick Sciba 21 Yard field goal
  Wake 10–7; 10 plays, 77 yards, 3:10

Second Quarter

- (14:11) USU – Jordan Nathan 27 yard pass from Jordan Love, Eberle kick
  USU 14–10; 5 plays, 90 yards, 1:16
- (6:27) Wake – Scotty Washington 9 yard pass from Jamie Newman, Sciba kick
  Wake 17–14; 7 plays, 44 yards, 2:13
- (0:25) USU – Siaosi Mariner 17 yard pass from Jordan Love, Eberle kick
  USU 21–17; 7 plays, 80 yards, 1:42

Third Quarter

- (9:08) Wake – Jamie Newman 1 yard run, Sciba kick
  Wake 24–21; 14 plays, 65 yards, 4:26
- (5:42) USU – Deven Thompkins 56 yard pass from Jordan Love, Eberle kick
  USU 28–24; 2 plays, 73 yards, 0:33
- (0:49) Wake – Christian Beal-Smith 12 yard run, Sciba kick
  Wake 31–28; 1 play, 12 yards, 0:06

Fourth Quarter

- (13:51) USU – Jaylen Warren 4 yard run, Eberle kick
  USU 35–31; 7 plays, 75 yards, 1:58
- (1:08) Wake – Kendall Hinton 2 yard pass from Jamie Newman, Sciba kick
  Wake 38–35; 6 plays, 89 yards, 1:11

Passing Leaders

- USU – Jordan Love – 33/48, 416 YDS, 3 TD, 3 INT
- WF – Jamie Newman – 34/47, 401 YDS, 3 TD, 0 INT

Rushing Leaders

- USU – Jaylen Warren – 19 ATT, 141 YDS, 1 TD
- WF – Cade Carney – 25 ATT, 105 YDS, 0 TD

Receiving Leaders

- USU – Siaosi Mariner – 8 REC, 118 YDS, 1 TD
- WF – Sage Surratt – 7 REC, 158 YDS, 1 TD

=== Stony Brook ===
Stony Brook Seawolves at Utah State Aggies

Quarter	1	2	3	4	Total
Seawolves	0	0	7	0	7
Aggies	17	17	14	14	62

at Maverik Stadium, Logan, UT

- Date: September 7, 2019
- Game time: 5:30 p.m.
- Game weather: Temperature: 79 • Wind: 5 mph W • Weather: Overcast
- Game attendance: 22,247
- Referee: Cal McNeill
- TV announcers (Facebook Stadium): Ari Wolfe, Eddie Royal, and Dani Klupenger
- USU Game Notes

Game information

First Quarter

- (12:06) USU – Dominik Eberle 35 yard field goal
  USU 3–0; 10 plays, 54 yards, 2:04
- (7:26) USU – Deven Thompkins 45 yard punt return, Eberle kick
  USU 10–0
- (3:27) USU – Siaosi Mariner 29 yard pass from Jordan Love, Eberle kick
  USU 17–0; 10 plays, 76 yards, 2:44

Second Quarter

- (14:09) USU – Dominik Eberle 37 yard field goal
  USU 20–0; 11 plays, 59 yards, 2:45
- (6:29) USU – Jaylen Warren 28 yard run, Eberle kick
  USU 27–0; 9 plays, 98 yards, 2:50
- (2:08) USU – Gerold Bright 2 yard run, Eberle kick
  USU 34–0; 6 plays, 80 yards, 1:36

Third Quarter

- (14:26) USU – Jaylen Warren 54 yard run, Eberle kick
  USU 41–0; 2 plays, 79 yards, 0:28
- (8:17) SB – Isaiah White 3 yard pass from Jack Cassidy, Courtney kick
  USU 41–7; 14 plays, 75 yards, 6:09
- (0:13) USU – Derek Wright 30 yard pass from Henry Colombi, Eberle kick
  USU 48–7; 10 plays, 80 yards, 4:30

Fourth Quarter

- (13:45) USU – Andrew Peasley 59 yard run, Eberle kick
  USU 55–7; 2 plays, 58 yards, 0:31
- (10:17) USU – Deven Thompkins 10 yard pass from Henry Colombi, Eberle kick
  USU 62–7; 7 plays, 63 yards, 1:58

Passing Leaders

- SBU – Jack Cassidy – 14/28, 129 YDS, 1 TD, 1 INT
- USU – Jordan Love – 25/34, 294 YDS, 1 TD, 0 INT

Rushing Leaders

- SBU – Seba Nekhet – 14 ATT, 46 YDS, 0 TD
- USU – Jaylen Warren – 9 ATT, 105 YDS, 2 TD

Receiving Leaders

- SBU – Nick Anderson – 6 REC, 44 YDS, 0 TD
- USU – Deven Thompkins – 5 REC, 77 YDS, 1 TD

=== At San Diego State ===
Utah State Aggies at San Diego State Aztecs

Quarter	1	2	3	4	Total
Aggies	7	13	3	0	23
Aztecs	3	0	0	14	17

at SDCCU Stadium, San Diego, CA

- Date: September 21, 2019
- Game time: 8:30 p.m. MDT
- Game weather: Temperature: 70 • Wind: 0 mph • Weather: Clear, mild skies
- Game attendance: 27,376
- Referee: Stephen Baron
- TV announcers (CBS Sports Network): Rich Waltz, Aaron Taylor, and Jenny Dell
- USU Game Notes

Game information

First Quarter

- (7:49) SDSU – Matt Araiza 22 yard field goal
  SDSU 3–0; 16 plays, 70 yards, 7:11
- (6:00) USU – Shaq Bond 48-yard interception returned for touchdown, Eberle kick
  USU 7–3; 3 plays, 5 yards, 0:55

Second Quarter

- (13:08) USU – Dominik Eberle 30 yard field goal
  USU 10–3; 15 plays, 74 yards, 4:24
- (3:27) USU – Dominik Eberle 29 yard field goal
  USU 13–3; 8 plays, 38 yards, 2:07
- (0:36) USU – Jaylen Warren 11 yard run, Eberle kick
  USU 20–3; 7 plays, 80 yards, 0:44

Third Quarter

- (10:53) USU – Dominik Eberle 32 yard field goal
  USU 23–3; 13 plays, 57 yards, 4:06

Fourth Quarter

- (10:03) SDSU – Kobe Smith 25 yard pass from Ryan Agnew, Araiza kick
  USU 23–10; 13 plays, 79 yards, 6:11
- (5:19) SDSU – Isaiah Richardson 48 yard pass from Ryan Agnew, Araiza kick
  USU 23–17; 8 plays, 91 yards, 3:08

Passing Leaders

- USU – Jordan Love – 30/47, 293 YDS, 0 TD, 0 INT
- SDSU – Ryan Agnew – 20/37, 281 YDS, 2 TD, 1 INT

Rushing Leaders

- USU – Jaylen Warren – 17 ATT, 74 YDS, 1 TD
- SDSU – Chance Bell – 18 ATT, 63 YDS, 0 TD

Receiving Leaders

- USU – Savon Scarver – 5 REC, 90 YDS, 0 TD
- SDSU – Kobe Smith – 7 REC, 102 YDS, 1 TD

=== Colorado State ===
Colorado State Rams at Utah State Aggies

Quarter	1	2	3	4	Total
Rams	7	14	3	0	24
Aggies	7	17	3	7	34

at Maverik Stadium, Logan, UT

- Date: September 28, 2019
- Game time: 5:30 p.m. MDT
- Game weather: Temperature: 48 • Wind: 7 mph • Weather: Rain showers
- Game attendance: 20,017
- Referee: David Alvarez
- TV announcers (CBS Sports Network): Carter Blackburn, Aaron Taylor, and Jenny Dell
- USU Game Notes

Game information

First Quarter

- (7:14) CSU – Jaylen Thomas 2 yard run, Camper kick
  CSU 7–0; 6 plays, 18 yards, 2:03
- (7:01) USU – Savon Scarver 100 yard kickoff return, Eberle kick
  TIED 7–7

Second Quarter

- (14:24) CSU – Marvin Kinsey Jr. 1 yard run, Camper kick
  CSU 14–7; 8 plays, 80 yards, 3:16
- (13:00) USU – Deven Thompkins 37 yard pass from Jordan Love, Eberle kick
  TIED 14–14; 6 plays, 72 yards, 1:24
- (10:03) CSU – Andre Neal 44 yard interception, Camper kick
  CSU 21–14
- (6:41) USU – Dominik Eberle 42 yard field goal
  CSU 21–17; 9 plays, 49 yards, 3:22
- (1:08) USU – Caleb Repp 40 yard pass from Jordan Love, Eberle kick
  USU 24–21; 10 plays, 82 yards, 3:26

Third Quarter

- (13:43) CSU – Cayden Camper 45 yard field goal
  TIED 24–24; 4 plays, 3 yards, 1:01
- (2:57) USU – Dominik Eberle 48 yard field goal
  USU 27–24; 6 plays, 22 yards, 1:59

Fourth Quarter

- (9:32) USU – David Woodward 8 yard fumble recovery, Eberle kick
  USU 34–24

Passing Leaders

- CSU – Patrick O'Brien – 14/30, 217 YDS, O TD, O INT
- USU – Jordan Love – 17/33, 204 YDS, 2 TD, 2 INT

Rushing Leaders

- CSU – Marvin Kinsey Jr. – 22 ATT, 70 YDS, 1 TD
- USU – Gerold Bright – 36 ATT, 179 YDS, 0 TD

Receiving Leaders

- CSU – Nate Craig-Myers – 3 REC, 97 YDS, 0 TD
- USU – Caleb Repp – 3 REC, 60 YDS, 1 TD

=== At LSU ===
Utah State Aggies at LSU Tigers

Quarter	1	2	3	4	Total
Aggies	6	0	0	0	6
No. 5 Tigers	7	14	14	7	42

at Tiger Stadium, Baton Rouge, LA

- Date: October 5, 2019
- Game time: 10:00 a.m. MDT
- Game weather: Temperature: 84 • Wind: 4 mph E • Weather: Sunny
- Game attendance: 100,266
- Referee: Matt Loeffler
- TV announcers (SEC Network): Dave Neal, D.J. Shockley, and Dawn Davenport
- USU Game Notes

Game information

First Quarter

- (10:41) LSU – Derrick Dillon 7 yard pass from Joe Burrow, Cade York kick
  LSU 7–0; 12 plays, 75 yards, 4:19
- (6:25) USU – Dominik Eberle 30 yard field goal
  LSU 7–3; 4 plays, -6 yards, 0:58
- (1:45) USU – Dominik Eberle 47 yard field goal
  LSU 7–6; 5 plays, 35 yards, 0:52

Second Quarter

- (14:03) LSU – Joe Burrow 1 yard run, York kick
  LSU 14–6; 6 plays, 74 yards, 2:42
- (4:55) LSU – Ja'Marr Chase 25 yard pass from Joe Burrow, York kick
  LSU 21–6; 13 plays, 99 yards, 6:42

Third Quarter

- (9:55) LSU – Justin Jefferson 4 yard pass from Joe Burrow, York kick
  LSU 28–6; 11 plays, 53 yards, 4:15
- (2:54) LSU – Justin Jefferson 39 yard pass from Joe Burrow, York kick
  LSU 35–6; 4 plays, 63 yards, 1:29

Fourth Quarter

- (2:54) LSU – Thaddeus Moss 8 yard pass from Joe Burrow, York kick
  LSU 42–6; 7 plays, 44 yards, 3:40

Passing Leaders

- USU – Jordan Love – 15/30, 130 YDS, 0 TD, 3 INT
- LSU – Joe Burrow – 27/38, 344 YDS, 5 TD, 1 INT

Rushing Leaders

- USU – Gerold Bright – 8 ATT, 18 YDS, 0 TD
- LSU – Clyde Edwards-Helaire – 14 ATT, 72 YDS, 0 TD

Receiving Leaders

- USU – Jordan Nathan – 4 REC, 51 YDS, 0 TD
- LSU – Justin Jefferson – 9 REC, 155 YDS, 2 TD

=== Nevada ===
Nevada Wolf Pack at Utah State Aggies

Quarter	1	2	3	4	Total
Wolf Pack	3	0	0	7	10
Aggies	9	13	0	14	36

at Maverik Stadium, Logan, UT

- Date: October 19, 2019
- Game time: 8:15 p.m. MDT
- Game weather: Temperature: 35 • Wind: 12 mph SSE • Weather: Cloudy
- Game attendance: 15,240
- Referee: Michael Vandervelde
- TV announcers (ESPNU): Mike Couzens and Kirk Morrison
- USU Game Notes

Game information

First Quarter

- (9:45) NEV – Brandon Talton 23 yard field goal
  NEV 3-0; 10 plays, 75 yards, 5:10
- (9:33) USU – Savon Scarver 100 yard kickoff return, Eberle kick
  USU 7–3
- (0:08) USU – Justus Te'i 1 yard safety
  USU 9–3

Second Quarter

- (10:58) USU – Dominik Eberle 29 yard field goal
  USU 12-3; 6 plays, 23 yards, 1:43
- (5:33) USU – Caleb Repp 13 yard pass from Jordan Love, Eberle kick
  USU 19-3; 7 plays, 39 yards, 1:50
- (2:07) USU – Dominik Eberle 32 yard field goal
  USU 22-3; 8 plays, 57 yards, 1:39

Third Quarter

- NO SCORING PLAYS

Fourth Quarter

- (11:27) USU – Gerold Bright 67 yard run, Eberle kick
  USU 29-3; 3 plays, 80 yards, 0:38
- (10:03) USU – Gerold Bright 9 yard run, Eberle kick
  USU 36-3; 2 plays, 57 yards, 0:23
- (4:48) NEV – Toa Taua 20 yard run, Talton kick
  USU 36-10; 12 plays, 75 yards, 5:15

Passing Leaders

- NEV – Malik Henry – 17/38, 213 YDS, 0 TD, 2 INT
- USU – Jordan Love – 13/31, 169 YDS, 1 TD, 1 INT

Rushing Leaders

- NEV – Toa Taua – 20 ATT, 84 YDS, 1 TD
- USU – Gerold Bright – 15 ATT, 126 YDS, 2 TD

Receiving Leaders

- NEV – Romeo Doubs – 4 REC, 80 YDS, 0 TD
- USU – Siaosi Mariner – 2 REC, 53 YDS, 0 TD

=== At Air Force ===
Utah State Aggies at Air Force Falcons

Quarter	1	2	3	4	Total
Aggies	0	0	7	0	7
Falcons	0	17	7	7	31

at Falcon Stadium, Colorado Springs, CO

- Date: October 26, 2019
- Game time: 8:15 p.m. MDT
- Game weather: Temperature: 52 • Wind: Windy • Weather: Clear
- Game attendance: 19,248
- Referee: Scott Campbell
- TV announcers (ESPN2): Mike Couzens, Kirk Morrison, and Taylor McGregor
- USU Game Notes

Game information

First Quarter

- NO SCORING PLAYS

Second Quarter

- (11:55) AFA – Timothy Jackson 1 yard run, Koehnke kick
  AFA 7–0; 10 plays, 85 yards, 5:03
- (6:36) AFA – Kadin Remsberg 1 yard run, Koehnke kick
  AFA 14–0; 8 plays, 57 yards, 4:00
- (0:00) AFA – Jake Koehnke 57 yard field goal
  AFA 17–0; 12 plays, 50 yards, 5:01

Third Quarter

- (11:49) USU – Siaosi Mariner 27 yard pass from Jordan Love, Eberle kick
  AFA 17–7; 9 plays, 75 yards, 3:11
- (3:17) AFA – Kadin Remsberg 9 yard run, Koehnke kick
  AFA 24–7; 8 plays, 41 yards, 3:53

Fourth Quarter

- (10:06) AFA – Taven Birdow 1 yard run, Koehnke kick
  AFA 31-7; 11 plays, 66 yards, 6:21

Passing

- USU – Jordan Love – 14/23, 114 YDS, 1 TD, 0 INT
- AFA – DJ Hammond III – 1/5, 16 YDS, 0 TD, 0 INT

Rushing

- USU – Gerold Bright – 6 ATT, 24 YDS, 0 TD
- AFA – Timothy Jackson – 25 ATT, 148 YDS, 1 TD

Receiving

- USU – Siaosi Mariner – 3 REC, 38 YDS, 1 TD
- AFA – Ben Waters – 2 REC, 24 YDS, 0 TD

=== BYU ===
BYU Cougars at Utah State Aggies

Quarter	1	2	3	4	Total
Cougars	7	14	14	7	42
Aggies	7	7	0	0	14

at Maverik Stadium, Logan, UT

- Date: November 2, 2019
- Game time: 8:05 p.m.
- Game weather: 34 °F (1 °C), Winds N 2 mph; Mostly Clear
- Game attendance: 25,472
- Referee: Michael VanderVelde
- TV announcers (ESPN2): Jason Benetti, Rod Gilmore, and Quint Kessenich

Game information

First Quarter

- (9:22) BYU – Aleva Hifo 6-yard run, Jake Oldroyd kick
  BYU 7–0; 11 plays, 93 yards, 4:36
- (0:18) USU – Siaosi Mariner 26-yard pass from Jordan Love, Dominik Eberle kick
  TIED 7–7; 7 plays, 86 yards, 2:17

Second Quarter

- (11:53) BYU – Jaren Hall 16-yard run, Jake Oldroyd kick
  BYU 14–7; 1 plays, 16 yards, 0:06
- (2:33) BYU – Jaren Hall 7-yard run, Jake Oldroyd kick
  BYU 21–7; 7 plays, 71 yards, 3:30
- (0:34) USU – Gerold Bright 1-yard run, Dominik Eberle kick
  BYU 21–14; 11 plays, 86 yards, 1:52

Third Quarter

- (11:47) BYU – Micah Simon 11-yard pass from Baylor Romney, Jake Oldroyd kick
  BYU 28–14; 7 plays, 75 yards, 3:13
- (7:12) BYU – Gunner Romney 1-yard pass from Baylor Romney, Jake Oldroyd kick
  BYU 35–14; 7 plays, 68 yards, 2:53

Fourth Quarter

- (9:31) BYU – Lopini Katoa 6-yard run, Jake Oldroyd kick
  BYU 42–14; 10 plays, 99 yards, 5:00

Passing

- BYU – Jaren Hall – 12/16, 214 yards
- USU – Jordan Love – 29/49, 394 yards, TD, 3 INT

Rushing

- BYU – Sione Finau – 15 carries, 72 yards
- USU – Gerold Bright – 12 carries, 66 yards, TD

Receiving

- BYU – Lopini Katoa – 4 receptions, 129 yards
- USU – Jordan Nathan – 7 receptions, 133 yards

=== At Fresno State ===
Utah State Aggies at Fresno State Bulldogs

Quarter	1	2	3	4	Total
Aggies	7	14	10	6	37
Bulldogs	7	7	14	7	35

at Bulldog Stadium, Fresno, CA

- Date: November 9, 2019
- Game time: 5:00 p.m.

Game information

First Quarter
Second Quarter
Third Quarter
Fourth Quarter

Passing

- USU –
- FSU –

Rushing

- USU –
- FSU –

Receiving

- USU –
- FSU –

=== Wyoming ===
Wyoming Cowboys at Utah State Aggies

Quarter	1	2	3	4	Total
Cowboys	0	14	0	7	21
Aggies	0	20	3	2	25

at Maverik Stadium, Logan, UT

- Date: November 16, 2019
- Game time: 2:00 p.m.
- Game attendance: 16,364
- TV: ESPNU

Game information

First Quarter

No scoring plays

Second Quarter

- (14:54) WYO – Logan Wilson 10-yard interception return, Cooper Rothe kick
  WYO 7–0; 2 plays, 3 yards, 0:48
- (11:35) USU – Siaosi Mariner 80-yard pass from Jordan Love, Dominik Eberle kick
  TIED 7–7; 2 plays, 84 yards, 0:29
- (7:32) USU – Gerold Bright 35-yard pass from Jordan Love, Dominik Eberle kick
  USU 14–7; 7 plays, 77 yards, 1:28
- (5:34) WYO – Tyler Vander Waal 11-yard run, Cooper Rothe kick
  TIED 14–14; 5 plays, 61 yards, 1:51
- (2:04) USU – Dominik Eberle 47-yard field goal
  USU 17–14; 8 plays, 43 yards, 3:28
- (0:09) USU – Dominik Eberle 44-yard field goal
  USU 20–14; 7 plays, 30 yards, 1:06

Third Quarter

- (4:44) USU – Dominik Eberle 26-yard field goal
  USU 23–14; 4 plays, 5 yards, 0:54

Fourth Quarter

- (11:11) USU – Dominik Eberle 23-yard field goal
  USU 26–14; 4 plays, -4 yards, 1:37
- (6:52) WYO – Tyler Vander Waal 5-yard run, Cooper Rothe kick
  USU 26–21; 9 plays, 75 yards, 4:19

Passing

- WYO – Tyler Vander Waal – 20/36, 185 yards, 3 INT
- USU – Jordan Love – 18/29, 282 yards, 2 TD, 2 INT

Rushing

- WYO – Xazavian Valladay – 25 carries, 114 yards
- USU – Gerold Bright – 17 carries, 56 yards

Receiving

- WYO – Josh Harshman – 6 receptions, 76 yards
- USU – Siaosi Mariner – 4 receptions, 123 yards, TD

=== Boise State ===
Boise State Broncos at Utah State Aggies

Quarter	1	2	3	4	Total
No. 20 Broncos	21	21	14	0	56
Aggies	7	0	7	7	21

at Maverik Stadium, Logan, UT

- Date: November 23, 2019
- Game time: 8:30 p.m.
- Game weather: Temperature: 33 °F (1 °C) • Weather: Clear • Wind: 2 MPH S
- Game attendance: 18,315
- Referee: David Alvarez
- TV announcers (CBSSN): Carter Blackburn, Aaron Taylor

Game information

First Quarter

- (13:21) BSU – John Hightower 30-yard pass from Jaylon Henderson, Eric Sachse kick
  BSU 7–0; 4 plays, 75 yards, 1:39
- (7:28) USU – Caleb Repp 7-yard pass from Jordan Love, Dominik Eberle kick
  TIE 7–7; 11 plays, 86 yards, 3:10
- (5:14) BSU – Jalen Walker 15-yard interception return, Eric Sachse kick
  BSU 14–7; 7 plays, 35 yards, 2:08
- (1:20) BSU – George Holani 5-yard run, Eric Sachse kick
  BSU 21–7; 5 plays, 61 yards, 2:28

Second Quarter

- (11:50) BSU – George Holani 1-yard run, Eric Sachse kick
  BSU 28–7; 7 plays, 51 yards, 3:10
- (6:11) BSU – Robert Mahone 1-yard run, Eric Sachse kick
  BSU 35–7; 10 plays, 84 yards, 4:06
- (0:19) BSU – Khalil Shakir 14-yard pass from Jaylon Henderson, Eric Sachse kick
  BSU 42–7; 14 plays, 75 yards, 4:02

Third Quarter

- (12:28) BSU – Avery Williams 74-yard punt return, Eric Sachse kick
  BSU 49–7; 6 plays, 13 yards, 2:32
- (4:32) BSU – CT Thomas 15-yard pass from Jaylon Henderson, Eric Sachse kick
  BSU 56–7; 12 plays, 83 yards, 6:17
- (0:26) USU – Gerold Bright 6-yard run, Dominik Eberle kick
  BSU 56–14; 13 plays, 75 yards, 4:06

Fourth Quarter

- (1:40) USU – Henry Colombi 2-yard run, Dominik Eberle kick
  BSU 56–21; 13 plays, 84 yards, 4:58

Passing

- BSU – Jaylon Henderson – 16/28, 187 yards, 3 TD
- USU – Jordan Love – 21/36, 229 yards, TD, INT

Rushing

- BSU – George Holani – 16 carries, 178 yards, 2 TD
- USU – Gerold Bright – 10 carries, 44 yards, TD

Receiving

- BSU – John Hightower – 3 receptions, 56 yards, TD
- USU – Siaosi Mariner – 4 receptions, 66 yards

=== At New Mexico ===
Utah State Aggies at New Mexico Lobos

Quarter	1	2	3	4	Total
Aggies	7	24	7	0	38
Lobos	0	6	12	7	25

at Dreamstyle Stadium, Albuquerque, NM

- Date: November 30, 2019
- Game time: 2:00 p.m.

Game information

First Quarter
Second Quarter
Third Quarter
Fourth Quarter

Passing

- USU –
- UNM –

Rushing

- USU –
- UNM –

Receiving

- USU –
- UNM –

=== vs Kent State (Frisco Bowl) ===
Utah State Aggies vs. Kent State Golden Flashes

Quarter	1	2	3	4	Total
Aggies	10	7	10	14	41
Golden Flashes	17	6	3	25	51

at Toyota Stadium, Frisco, TX

- Date: December 20, 2019
- Game time: 5:30 p.m. MDT
- Game weather: Cloudy • Temperature: 48 °F (9 °C) • Wind: SE 8 mph
- Game attendance: 12,120
- Referee: Ken Antee
- TV announcers (ESPN2): Anish Shroff (play-by-play), John Congemi (analyst) and Kris Budden (sideline)
- ESPN game summary

Game information

First Quarter

- (12:02) USU – Gerold Bright 4 yard rush, Dominik Eberle kick (Drive: 10 plays, 75 yards, 2:58; Utah State 7–0)
- (11:10) KENT – Dustin Crum 78 yard pass to Isaiah McCoy, Matthew Trickett kick (Drive: 3 plays, 81 yards, 0:43; Tied 7–7)
- (5:37) KENT – Xavier Williams 2 yard rush, Matthew Trickett kick (Drive: 12 plays, 77 yards, 4:23; Kent State 14–7)
- (2:50) KENT – Matthew Trickett 40 yard field goal (Drive: 6 plays, 20 yards, 2:08; Kent State 17–7)
- (0:03) USU – Dominik Eberle 41 yard field goal (Drive: 6 plays, 46 yards, 2:40; Kent State 17–10)

Second Quarter

- (8:24) USU – Jordan Love 25 yard pass to Siaosi Mariner, Dominik Eberle kick (Drive: 8 plays, 68 yards, 2:36; Tied 17–17)
- (5:07) KENT – Matthew Trickett 22 yard field goal (Drive: 4 plays, 3 yards, 1:33; Kent State 20–17)
- (0:00) KENT – Matthew Trickett 36 yard field goal (Drive: 8 plays, 67 yards, 0:58; Kent State 23–17)

Third Quarter

- (11:41) KENT – Matthew Trickett 29 yard field goal (Drive: 8 plays, 41 yards, 3:11; Kent State 26–17)
- (7:52) USU – Jordan Love 17 yard pass to Deven Thompkins, Dominik Eberle kick (Drive: 13 plays, 75 yards, 3:49; Kent State 26–24)
- (2:27) USU – Dominik Eberle 45 yard field goal (Drive: 9 plays, 44 yards, 3:31; Utah State 27–26)

Fourth Quarter

- (13:31) KENT – Will Matthews 4 yard rush, 2-point rush good (Drive: 2 plays, 57 yards, 0:26; Kent State 34–27)
- (12:48) USU – Deven Thompkins 57 yard rush, Dominik Eberle kick (Drive: 3 plays, 58 yards, 0:40; Tied 34–34)
- (9:36) KENT – Dustin Crum 1 yard pass to Antwan Dixon, Matthew Trickett kick (Drive: 8 plays, 64 yards, 3:09; Kent State 41–34)
- (4:56) KENT – Matthew Trickett 37 yard field goal (Drive: 8 plays, 24 yards, 3:50; Kent State 44–34)
- (3:06) USU – Jordan Love 11 yard pass to Siaosi Mariner, Dominik Eberle kick (Drive: 8 plays, 75 yards, 1:50; Kent State 44–41)
- (1:56) KENT – Dustin Crum 4 yard rush, Matthew Trickett kick (Drive: 4 plays, 13 yards, 1:01; Kent State 51–41)

Passing

- USU – Jordan Love – 30/39, 317 yards, 3 TD, INT
- KSU – Dustin Crum – 21/26, 289 yards, 2 TD

Rushing

- USU – Gerold Bright – 21 carries, 94 yards, TD
- KSU – Dustin Crum – 23 carries, 147 yards, TD

Receiving

- USU – Siaosi Mariner – 7 receptions, 113 yards, 2 TD
- KSU – Isaiah McKoy – 6 receptions, 103 yards, TD

== Rankings ==
Ranking movements Legend: ██ Increase in ranking ██ Decrease in ranking — = Not ranked RV = Received votes
	Week																
Poll	Pre	1	2	3	4	5	6	7	8	9	10	11	12	13	14	15	Final
AP	RV	—	—	—	—	—	—	—	—	—	—	—	—	—	—	—	
Coaches	RV	—	—	—	RV	RV	—	—	RV	—	—	—	—	—	—	—	
CFP	Not released										—	—	—	—	—	—	Not released

== Players drafted into the NFL ==
Round	Pick	Player	Position	NFL Club
1	26	Jordan Love	QB	Green Bay Packers
