= 2021 Mountain West Conference football season =

- League: NCAA Division I FBS
- Sport: Football
- Duration: August 28, 2021 – December 28, 2021
- Teams: 12
- TV partner(s): CBS Sports Family (CBS, CBSSN) Fox Sports Family (Fox, FS1, FS2), Stadium

2022 NFL Draft
- Top draft pick: TE Trey McBride, Colorado State
- Picked by: Arizona Cardinals, 55th overall

Regular season
- Mountain Division champions: Utah State
- West Division champions: San Diego State

Championship Game
- Champions: Utah State
- Runners-up: San Diego State

Seasons
- 2020 2022

2021 Mountain West Conference football standings
	Conf.			Overall
Team	W		L	W		L
Mountain Division
No. 24 Utah State xy$	6	–	2	11	–	3
Air Force x	6	–	2	10	–	3
Boise State	5	–	3	7	–	5
Wyoming	2	–	6	7	–	6
Colorado State	2	–	6	3	–	9
New Mexico	1	–	7	3	–	9
West Division
No. 25 San Diego State xy	7	–	1	12	–	2
Fresno State	6	–	2	10	–	3
Nevada	5	–	3	8	–	5
Hawaii	3	–	5	6	–	7
San Jose State	3	–	5	5	–	7
UNLV	2	–	6	2	–	10
Championship: Utah State 46, San Diego State 13
$ – Conference champion; x – Division champion/co-champions; y – Championship game participant; Rankings from AP Poll

The 2021 Mountain West Conference football season, part of this year's NCAA Division I FBS football season was the 23rd season of college football for the Mountain West Conference (MW). Since 2012, 12 teams have competed in the Mountain West Conference. The season began on August 28, 2021 and ended on December 28, 2021. The entire schedule was released on March 5, 2021.

== Preseason ==
=== Mountain West Media ===
The Mountain West Media days was held at the Cosmopolitan on July 27 and 28.

=== Preseason Poll ===
The Preseason Media Poll was released July 21, 2021. Boise State was picked to win the Mountain division, while Nevada was picked to win the West division.

Mountain
Predicted finish	Team	Votes (for first)
1	Boise State	148 (23)
2	Wyoming	115 (2)
3	Air Force	104
4	Colorado State	72
5	Utah State	47
6	New Mexico	39

West
Predicted finish	Team	Votes (for first)
1	Nevada	141 (19)
2	San Jose State	121 (5)
3	San Diego State	96
4	Fresno State	85 (1)
5	Hawaii	56
6	UNLV	26

=== Preseason awards ===
The following list contains players included on preseason watch lists for national awards.

Award	Head coach/Player	School	Position	Link
Maxwell Award	Khalil Shakir	Boise State	WR	
Maxwell Award	Ronnie Rivers	Fresno State	RB	
Maxwell Award	Carson Strong	Nevada	QB	
Maxwell Award	Romeo Doubs	Nevada	WR	
Maxwell Award	Greg Bell	San Diego State	RB	
Maxwell Award	Nick Starkel	San Jose State	QB	
Maxwell Award	Xazavian Valladay	Wyoming	RB	
Bednarik Award	Scott Patchan	Colorado State	DE	
Bednarik Award	Lawson Hall	Nevada	LB	
Bednarik Award	Cameron Thomas	San Diego State	DE	
Bednarik Award	Caden McDonald	San Diego State	LB	
Bednarik Award	Cade Hall	San Jose State	DE	
Bednarik Award	Justin Rice	Utah State	LB	
Bednarik Award	Chad Muma	Wyoming	LB	
Davey O'Brien Award	Nick Starkel	San Jose State	QB	
Davey O'Brien Award	Carson Strong	Nevada	QB	
Doak Walker Award	George Holani	Boise State	RB	
Fred Biletnikoff Award	Romeo Doubs	Nevada	WR	
Fred Biletnikoff Award	Khalil Shakir	Boise State	WR	
Fred Biletnikoff Award	Cole Turner	Nevada	TE	
John Mackey Award	Cole Turner	Nevada	TE	
John Mackey Award	Trey McBride	Colorado State	TE	
John Mackey Award	Derrick Deese Jr.	San Jose State	TE	
John Mackey Award	Daniel Bellinger	San Diego State	TE	
Rimington Trophy	Tyler Orsini	Nevada	C	
Butkus Award	Chad Muma	Wyoming	LB	
Outland Trophy	Keegan Cryder	Wyoming	C	
Outland Trophy	Jack Snyder	San Jose State	OT	
Outland Trophy	Jake Stetz	Boise State	G	
Outland Trophy	Zachary Thomas	San Diego State	OT	
Bronko Nagurski Trophy	Cade Hall	San Jose State	DE	
Bronko Nagurski Trophy	Caden McDonald	San Diego State	LB	
Bronko Nagurski Trophy	Darius Muasau	Hawaii	LB	
Bronko Nagurski Trophy	Scott Patchan	Colorado State	DE	
Bronko Nagurski Trophy	Cameron Thomas	San Diego State	DE	
Lou Groza Award	John Hoyland	Wyoming	K	
Lou Groza Award	Brandon Talton	Nevada	K	
Paul Hornung Award	Jordan Byrd	San Diego State	RB	
Paul Hornung Award	Tyleek Collins	UNLV	WR	
Paul Hornung Award	Romeo Doubs	Nevada	WR	
Paul Hornung Award	Ronnie Rivers	Fresno State	RB	
Paul Hornung Award	Calvin Turner	Hawaii	RB	
Wuerffel Trophy	Kekaula Kaniho	Boise State	DB	
Wuerffel Trophy	A'Jon Vivens	Colorado State	RB	
Wuerffel Trophy	Hekili Keliiliki	Hawaii	RB/LB	
Wuerffel Trophy	Tysyn Parker	San Jose State	LB	
Wuerffel Trophy	Julio Garcia II	UNLV	OL	
Wuerffel Trophy	Calvin Tyler Jr.	Utah State	RB	
Walter Camp Award	Cade Hall	San Jose State	DE	
Manning Award	Nick Starkel	San Jose State	QB	
Manning Award	Carson Strong	Nevada	QB	
Earl Campbell Tyler Rose Award	Nick Starkel	San Jose State	QB	
Earl Campbell Tyler Rose Award	CT Thomas	Boise State	WR	
Earl Campbell Tyler Rose Award	Keric Wheatfall	Fresno State	WR	
Ray Guy Award	Ryan Stonehouse	Colorado State	P	
Polynesian College Football Player Of The Year Award	Demytrick Ali'fua	Utah State	OL	
Polynesian College Football Player Of The Year Award	Falepule Alo	Utah State	OL	
Polynesian College Football Player Of The Year Award	Chevan Cordeiro	Hawaii	QB	
Polynesian College Football Player Of The Year Award	Leif Fautanu	UNLV	OL	
Polynesian College Football Player Of The Year Award	Viliami Fehoko	San Jose State	DL	
Polynesian College Football Player Of The Year Award	Kekaniokoa Holomalia-Gonzalez	Boise State	OL	
Polynesian College Football Player Of The Year Award	George Holani	Boise State	RB	
Polynesian College Football Player Of The Year Award	Kekaula Kaniho	Boise State	DB	
Polynesian College Football Player Of The Year Award	Kohl Levao	Hawaii	OL	
Polynesian College Football Player Of The Year Award	Tyson Maeva	Fresno State	LB	
Polynesian College Football Player Of The Year Award	Alii Matau	San Jose State	LB	
Polynesian College Football Player Of The Year Award	Darius Muasau	Hawaii	LB	
Polynesian College Football Player Of The Year Award	Ezekiel Noa	Boise State	LB	
Polynesian College Football Player Of The Year Award	Jonah Panoke	Hawaii	WR	
Polynesian College Football Player Of The Year Award	Khalil Shakir	Boise State	WR	
Polynesian College Football Player Of The Year Award	Toa Taua	Nevada	RB	
Polynesian College Football Player Of The Year Award	Alama Uluave	San Diego State	OL	
Polynesian College Football Player Of The Year Award	Solo Vaipulu	Hawaii	OL	
Johnny Unitas Golden Arm Award	Hank Bachmeier	Boise State	QB	
Johnny Unitas Golden Arm Award	Sean Chambers	Wyoming	QB	
Johnny Unitas Golden Arm Award	Nick Starkel	San Jose State	QB	
Johnny Unitas Golden Arm Award	Carson Strong	Nevada	QB	
Johnny Unitas Golden Arm Award	Terry Wilson	New Mexico	QB	

=== Preseason All-Conference Team ===
The Preseason All-Conference Team was announced only July 22, 2021.

- Offensive player of the year: Carson Strong (Junior, Nevada quarterback)
- Defensive player of the year: Cade Hall (Senior, San Jose State defensive lineman)
- Special Teams Player of the Year: Savon Scarver (Senior, Utah State kick returner)

Position	Player	Team
Offense
QB	Carson Strong	Nevada
RB	Xazavian Valladay	Wyoming
RB	Ronnie Rivers	Fresno State
OL	Keegan Cryder	Wyoming
OL	John Ojukwu	Boise State
OL	Jack Snyder	San Jose State
OL	Zachary Thomas	San Diego State
OL	Jake Stetz	Boise State
TE	Cole Turner	Nevada
WR	Romeo Doubs	Nevada
WR	Khalil Shakir	Boise State
Defense
DL	Cade Hall	San Jose State
DL	Cameron Thomas	San Diego State
DL	Scott Patchan	Colorado State
DL	Viliami Fehoko	San Jose State
LB	Chad Muma	Wyoming
LB	Caden McDonald	San Diego State
LB	Darius Muasau	Hawaii
DB	Kekaula Kaniho	Boise State
DB	Jerrick Reed II	New Mexico
DB	Cortez Davis	Hawaii
DB	Tre Jenkins	San Jose State
Special teams
K	Brandon Talton	Nevada
P	Ryan Stonehouse	Colorado State
PR	Calvin Turner	Hawaii
KR	Savon Scarver	Utah State

== Rankings ==
		Pre	Wk 1	Wk 2	Wk 3	Wk 4	Wk 5	Wk 6	Wk 7	Wk 8	Wk 9	Wk 10	Wk 11	Wk 12	Wk 13	Wk 14	Final
Air Force	AP							RV	RV								RV
Air Force	C	RV	RV	RV				RV	RV	RV	RV			RV	RV		RV
Air Force	CFP	Not released															
Boise State	AP	RV															
Boise State	C	RV		RV													
Boise State	CFP	Not released															
Colorado State	AP																
Colorado State	C																
Colorado State	CFP	Not released															
Fresno State	AP			RV	22	18	RV				25				RV		RV
Fresno State	C		RV	RV	25	21	RV	RV	RV	RV	RV	RV	RV		RV	RV	RV
Fresno State	CFP	Not released									23						
Hawaii	AP																
Hawaii	C																
Hawaii	CFP	Not released															
Nevada	AP	RV	RV	RV							RV						
Nevada	C	RV	RV	RV	RV		RV	RV				RV					
Nevada	CFP	Not released															
New Mexico	AP																
New Mexico	C																
New Mexico	CFP	Not released															
San Diego State	AP				RV	RV	25	24	22	21	RV	RV	23	22	19	RV	25
San Diego State	C			RV	RV	RV	RV	24	21	20	RV	RV	23	22	19	RV	RV
San Diego State	CFP	Not released									24	22	19	21	19	24	
San Jose State	AP																
San Jose State	C	RV	RV	RV													
San Jose State	CFP	Not released															
UNLV	AP																
UNLV	C																
UNLV	CFP	Not released															
Utah State	AP												RV			RV	24
Utah State	C				RV								RV		RV	RV	24
Utah State	CFP	Not released															
Wyoming	AP				RV												
Wyoming	C					RV											
Wyoming	CFP	Not released															

Legend
	Improvement in ranking
	Drop in ranking
	Not ranked previous week
	No change in ranking from previous week
RV	Received votes but were not ranked in Top 25 of poll
т	Tied with team above or below also with this symbol

== Coaches ==
=== Coaching Changes ===
Bryan Harsin left Boise State after seven years at the school to take the head coach position at Auburn of the SEC. He was replaced by Andy Avalos.

Gary Andersen was fired by Utah State in November 2020. He was replaced by Blake Anderson.

=== Head coaches ===
Team	Head coach	Years at school	Overall record	Record at school	MW record
Air Force	Troy Calhoun	15	101–72	101–72	61–46
Boise State	Andy Avalos	1	0–0	0–0	0–0
Colorado State	Steve Addazio	2	58–58	1–3	1–3
Fresno State	Kalen DeBoer	2	3–3	3–3	3–3
Hawaii	Todd Graham	2	100–65	4–4	4–4
Nevada	Jay Norvell	5	25–22	18–14	18–14
New Mexico	Danny Gonzales	2	2–5	2–5	2–5
San Diego State	Brady Hoke	4	17–16	11–11	11–11
San Jose State	Brent Brennan	5	15–30	11–20	11–20
UNLV	Marcus Arroyo	2	0–6	0–6	0–6
Utah State	Blake Anderson	1	51–37	0–0	0–0
Wyoming	Craig Bohl	8	152–76	38–44	25–29

=== Post-season changes ===
- On November 29, Fresno State head coach Kalen DeBoer announced that he would become the new head coach of Washington in the Pac-12 Conference beginning in 2022. Assistant head coach and running backs coach Lee Marks was named interim head coach for the team's bowl game. On December 8, the school announced that Jeff Tedford had been rehired as head coach after taking two years off for health issues.
- On December 2, Colorado State announced that they had fired head coach Steve Addazio after two seasons.
- On December 6, Nevada head coach Jay Norvell left the school to take the vacant head coach position at Colorado State.

== Schedule ==
The season began on August 28, 2021, and concluded on November 27, 2021.

=== Regular season ===
Index to colors and formatting
Mountain West Member won
Mountain West Member lost
Mountain West teams in **bold**

==== Week zero ====
Date	Time	Visiting team	Home team	Site	TV	Result	Attendance	Ref.
August 28	12:00 p.m.	UConn	**Fresno State**	Bulldog Stadium • Fresno, CA	CBSSN	**W** 45−0	26,043	
August 28	1:30 p.m.	**Hawaii**	UCLA	Rose Bowl Stadium • Pasadena, CA	ESPN	**L** 10−44	32,982	
August 28	8:00 p.m.	Southern Utah	**San Jose State**	CEFCU Stadium • San Jose, CA	CBSSN	**W** 45–14	16,204	
^{#}Rankings from AP Poll released prior to game. All times are in Mountain Time.

==== Week one ====
Date	Time	Visiting team	Home team	Site	TV	Result	Attendance	Ref.
September 2	5:00 p.m.	**Boise State**	UCF	Bounce House • Orlando, FL	ESPN	**L** 31–36	43,928	
September 2	6:00 p.m.	Houston Baptist	**New Mexico**	University Stadium • Albuquerque, NM	KASY-TV	**W** 27–17	15,908	
September 2	8:00 p.m.	No. 11 (FCS) Eastern Washington	**UNLV**	Allegiant Stadium • Paradise, NV	Stadium	**L** 33–35 ^{2OT}	21,970	
September 3	7:00 p.m.	No. 3 (FCS) South Dakota State	**Colorado State**	Canvas Stadium • Fort Collins, CO	FS1	**L** 23–42	32,327	
September 4	12:00 p.m.	**Fresno State**	No. 11 Oregon	Autzen Stadium • Eugene, OR	P12N	**L** 24–31	43,276	
September 4	12:00 p.m.	Lafayette	**Air Force**	Falcon Stadium • Colorado Springs, CO	Stadium	**W** 35–14	30,012	
September 4	2:00 p.m.	No. 12 (FCS) Montana State	**Wyoming**	War Memorial Stadium • Laramie, WY		**W** 19–16	27,007	
September 4	3:00 p.m.	**San Jose State**	No. 15 USC	Los Angeles Memorial Coliseum • Los Angeles, CA	P12N	**L** 7–30	54,398	
September 4	8:30 p.m.	**Nevada**	California	California Memorial Stadium • Berkeley, CA	FS1	**W** 22–17	35,117	
September 4	8:30 p.m.	New Mexico State	**San Diego State**	Dignity Health Sports Park • Carson, CA	CBSSN	**W** 28–10	10,116	
September 4	9:00 p.m.	**Utah State**	Washington State	Martin Stadium • Pullman, WA	P12N	**W** 26–23	24,944	
September 4	10:00 p.m.	Portland State	**Hawaii**	Clarence T. C. Ching Athletics Complex • Honolulu, HI	Spectrum OC16 PPV	**W** 49–35	0	
^{#}Rankings from AP Poll released prior to game. All times are in Mountain Time.

==== Week two ====
Date	Time	Visiting team	Home team	Site	TV	Result	Attendance	Ref.
September 10	7:00 p.m.	No. 9 (FCS) North Dakota	**Utah State**	Maverik Stadium • Logan, UT	CBSSN	**W** 48–24	18,124	
September 10	7:30 p.m.	UTEP	**Boise State**	Albertsons Stadium • Boise, ID	FS1	**W** 54–13	35,518	
September 11	11:30 a.m.	**Wyoming**	Northern Illinois	Huskie Stadium • DeKalb, IL	ESPN+	**W** 50–43	11,334	
September 11	1:30 p.m.	**Air Force**	Navy	Navy–Marine Corps Memorial Stadium • Annapolis, MD (Commander-in-Chief's Trophy)	CBS	**W** 23–3	36,997	
September 11	5:00 p.m.	New Mexico State	**New Mexico**	University Stadium • Albuquerque, NM (Rio Grande Rivalry)	Stadium	**W** 34–25	28,470	
September 11	8:00 p.m.	**San Diego State**	Arizona	Arizona Stadium • Tucson, AZ	P12N	**W** 38–14	39,097	
September 11	8:00 p.m.	Vanderbilt	**Colorado State**	Canvas Stadium • Fort Collins, CO	CBSSN	**L** 21–24		
September 11	8:00 p.m.	Cal Poly	**Fresno State**	Bulldog Stadium • Fresno, CA	KFRE-TV	**W** 63–10	30,119	
September 11	8:30 p.m.	Idaho State	**Nevada**	Mackay Stadium • Reno, NV	Stadium	**W** 49–10	23.965	
September 11	8:30 p.m.	**UNLV**	No. 23 Arizona State	Sun Devil Stadium • Tempe, AZ	ESPN2	**L** 10–37	42,918	
September 11	9:00 p.m.	**Hawaii**	Oregon State	Reser Stadium • Corvallis, OR	FS1	**L** 27–45	27,701	
^{#}Rankings from AP Poll released prior to game. All times are in Mountain Time.

Date	Bye Week
September 11	San Jose State

==== Week three ====
Date	Time	Visiting team	Home team	Site	TV	Result	Attendance	Ref.
September 18	10:00 a.m.	**New Mexico**	No. 7 Texas A&M	Kyle Field • College Station, TX	SECN	**L** 0–34	84,748	
September 18	12:05 p.m.	**Nevada**	Kansas State	Bill Snyder Family Football Stadium • Manhattan, KS	ESPN+	**L** 17–38	48,768	
September 18	2:00 p.m.	Ball State	**Wyoming**	War Memorial Stadium • Laramie, WY	Stadium	**W** 45–12	23,467	
September 18	2:00 p.m.	**Colorado State**	Toledo	Glass Bowl • Toledo, OH	ESPNU	**W** 22–6	21,365	
September 18	5:00 p.m.	Utah	**San Diego State**	Dignity Health Sports Park • Carson, CA	CBSSN	**W** 33–31 ^{3OT}	11,090	
September 18	5:30 p.m.	**Utah State**	**Air Force**	Falcon Stadium • Colorado Springs, CO	FS2	**USU** 49–45	20,264	
September 18	7:00 p.m.	Oklahoma State	**Boise State**	Albertsons Stadium • Boise, ID	FS1	**L** 20–21	36,702	
September 18	8:30 p.m.	No. 14 Iowa State	**UNLV**	Allegiant Stadium • Paradise, NV	CBSSN	**L** 3–48	35,193	
September 18	8:45 p.m.	**Fresno State**	No. 13 UCLA	Rose Bowl • Pasadena, CA	P12N	**W** 40–37	50,698	
September 18	10:30 p.m.	**San Jose State**	**Hawaii**	Clarence T. C. Ching Athletics Complex • Honolulu, HI	FS1	**SJSU** 17–13	0	
^{#}Rankings from AP Poll released prior to game. All times are in Mountain Time.

==== Week four ====
Date	Time	Visiting team	Home team	Site	TV	Result	Attendance	Ref.
September 24	8:00 p.m.	**UNLV**	No. 22 **Fresno State**	Bulldog Stadium • Fresno, CA	CBSSN	**FRES** 38–30	35,093	
September 25	10:00 a.m.	**Boise State**	**Utah State**	Maverik Stadium • Logan, UT	CBS	**BSU** 27–3	23,715	
September 25	12:00 p.m	**San Jose State**	Western Michigan	Waldo Stadium • Kalamazoo, MI	ESPN+	**L** 3–23	12,317	
September 25	1:30 p.m.	**Colorado State**	No. 5 Iowa	Kinnick Stadium • Iowa City, IA	FS1	**L** 14–24	65,456	
September 25	1:30 p.m.	Towson	**San Diego State**	Dignity Health Sports Park • Carson, CA	Stadium	**W** 48–21	7,619	
September 25	1:30 p.m.	**Wyoming**	UConn	Rentschler Field • East Hartford, CT	CBSSN	**W** 24–22	12,538	
September 25	6:00 p.m.	Florida Atlantic	**Air Force**	Falcon Stadium • Colorado Springs, CO	FS2	**W** 31–7	19,763	
September 25	6:00 p.m.	**Hawaii**	New Mexico State	Aggie Memorial Stadium • Las Cruces, NM	KVIA-TV	**W** 41–21	13.932	
September 25	7:00 p.m.	**New Mexico**	UTEP	Sun Bowl • El Paso, TX	ESPN+	**L** 13–20	15,069	
^{#}Rankings from AP Poll released prior to game. All times are in Mountain Time.

Date	Bye Week
September 25	Nevada

==== Week five ====
Date	Time	Visiting team	Home team	Site	TV	Result	Attendance	Ref.
October 1	7:00 p.m.	No. 13 BYU	**Utah State**	Maverik Stadium • Logan, UT (Rivalry)	CBSSN	**L** 20–34	25,240	
October 2	1:30 p.m.	**Nevada**	**Boise State**	Albertsons Stadium • Boise, ID (Rivalry)	FS1	**NEV** 41–31	37,426	
October 2	4:00 p.m.	**UNLV**	UTSA	Alamodome • San Antonio, TX	ESPN+	**L** 17–24	20,154	
October 2	4:30 p.m.	**Air Force**	**New Mexico**	University Stadium • Albuquerque, NM	FS2	**AF** 38–10	13,158	
October 2	8:30 p.m.	New Mexico State	**San Jose State**	CEFCU Stadium • San Jose, CA	NBCSBA	**W** 37–31	15,803	
October 2	9:00 p.m.	No. 18 **Fresno State**	**Hawaii**	Clarence T. C. Ching Athletics Complex • Honolulu, HI (Rivalry)	CBSSN	**HAW** 27–24	0	
^{#}Rankings from AP Poll released prior to game. All times are in Mountain Time.

Date	Bye Week		
October 2	Colorado State	San Diego State	Wyoming

==== Week six ====
Date	Time	Visiting team	Home team	Site	TV	Result	Attendance	Ref.
October 9	1:30 p.m.	**Boise State**	No. 10 BYU	Lavell Edwards Stadium • Provo, UT	ABC	**W** 26–17	63,470	
October 9	1:30 p.m.	**San Jose State**	**Colorado State**	Canvas Stadium • Fort Collins, CO	FS1	**CSU** 32–14	34,780	
October 9	5:00 p.m.	**Wyoming**	**Air Force**	Falcon Stadium • Colorado Springs, CO	CBSSN	**AF** 24–14	24,832	
October 9	7:00 p.m.	**New Mexico**	No. 25 **San Diego State**	Dignity Sports Health Park • Carson, CA	FS1	**SDSU** 31–7	8,387	
October 9	8:30 p.m.	New Mexico State	**Nevada**	Mackay Stadium • Reno, NV	CBSSN	**W** 55–28	21,448	
^{#}Rankings from AP Poll released prior to game. All times are in Mountain Time.

Date	Bye Week			
October 9	Fresno State	Hawaii	UNLV	Utah State

==== Week seven ====
Date	Time	Visiting team	Home team	Site	TV	Result	Attendance	Ref.
October 15	8:30 p.m.	No. 24 **San Diego State**	San Jose State	CEFCU Stadium • San Jose, CA	CBSSN	**SDSU** 19–13 ^{2OT}	17,177	
October 16	1:30 p.m.	**Fresno State**	Wyoming	War Memorial Stadium • Laramie, WY	FS2	**FRES** 17–0	20,002	
October 16	5:00 p.m.	**Utah State**	UNLV	Allegiant Stadium • Paradise, NV	CBSSN	**USU** 28–24	21,322	
October 16	5:00 p.m.	**Colorado State**	New Mexico	University Stadium • Albuquerque, NM	Stadium	**CSU** 36–7	15,403	
October 16	7:00 p.m.	**Air Force**	Boise State	Albertsons Stadium • Boise, ID	FS1	**AF** 24–17	34,446	
October 16	8:30 p.m.	**Hawaii**	Nevada	Mackay Stadium • Reno, NV	CBSSN	**NEV** 34–17	22,098	
^{#}Rankings from AP Poll released prior to game. All times are in Mountain Time.

==== Week eight ====
Date	Time	Visiting team	Home team	Site	TV	Result	Attendance	Ref.
October 21	9:00 p.m.	**San Jose State**	UNLV	Allegiant Stadium • Paradise, NV	CBSSN	**SJSU** 27–20	19,318	
October 22	7:30 p.m.	**Colorado State**	Utah State	Maverik Stadium • Logan, UT	CBSSN	**USU** 26–24	21,423	
October 23	1:30 p.m.	**New Mexico**	Wyoming	War Memorial Stadium • Laramie, WY	Stadium	**UNM** 14–3	20,133	
October 23	5:00 p.m.	No. 22 **San Diego State**	Air Force	Falcon Stadium • Colorado Springs, CO	CBSSN	**SDSU** 20–14	23,887	
October 23	5:00 p.m.	**Nevada**	Fresno State	Bulldog Stadium • Fresno, CA	FS1	**FRES** 34–32	33,012	
October 23	9:59 p.m.	New Mexico State	Hawaii	Clarence T. C. Ching Athletics Complex • Honolulu, HI	Spectrum OC16 ppv	**W** 48–34	0	
^{#}Rankings from AP Poll released prior to game. All times are in Mountain Time.

Date	Bye Week
October 23	Boise State

==== Week nine ====
Date	Time	Visiting team	Home team	Site	TV	Result	Attendance	Ref.
October 29	8:00 p.m.	**UNLV**	**Nevada**	Mackay Stadium • Reno, NV (Fremont Cannon)	CBSSN	**NEV** 51–20	28,960	
October 30	1:00 p.m.	**Hawaii**	**Utah State**	Maverik Stadium • Logan, UT	Spectrum OC16 PPV	**USU** 51–31	19,219	
October 30	2:00 p.m.	**Wyoming**	**San Jose State**	CEFCU Stadium • San Jose, CA	FS2	**SJSU** 27–21	13,042	
October 30	5:00 p.m.	**Boise State**	**Colorado State**	Canvas Stadium • Fort Collins, CO	CBSSN	**BSU** 28–19	25,221	
October 30	8:30 p.m.	**Fresno State**	No. 21 **San Diego State**	Dignity Health Sports Park • Carson, CA (Rivalry)	CBSSN	**FRES** 30–20	11,034	
^{#}Rankings from AP Poll released prior to game. All times are in Mountain Time.

Date	Bye Week	
October 30	Air Force	New Mexico

==== Week ten ====
Date	Time	Visiting team	Home team	Site	TV	Result	Attendance	Ref.
November 6	9:30 a.m.	Army	**Air Force**	Globe Life Field • Arlington, TX (Commander-in-Chief's Trophy)	CBS	**L** 14–21 ^{OT}		
November 6	1:30 p.m.	**Colorado State**	**Wyoming**	War Memorial Stadium • Laramie, WY (Border War)	CBSSN	**WYO** 31–17		
November 6	2:00 p.m.	**Utah State**	New Mexico State	Aggie Memorial Stadium • Las Cruces, NM	KVIA-TV	**W** 35–13		
November 6	5:00 p.m.	**Boise State**	No. 25 **Fresno State**	Bulldog Stadium • Fresno, CA	CBSSN	**BSU** 40–14		
November 6	5:00 p.m.	**UNLV**	**New Mexico**	University Stadium • Albuquerque, NM	Stadium	**UNLV** 31–17		
November 6	8:00 p.m.	**San Jose State**	**Nevada**	Mackay Stadium • Reno, NV	FS2	**NEV** 27–24		
November 6	9:00 p.m.	**San Diego State**	**Hawaii**	Clarence T. C. Ching Athletics Complex • Honolulu, HI	FS1	**SDSU** 17–10		
^{#}Rankings from AP Poll released prior to game. All times are in Mountain Time.

==== Week eleven ====
Date	Time	Visiting team	Home team	Site	TV	Result	Attendance	Ref.
November 12	7:00 p.m.	Wyoming	Boise State	Albertsons Stadium • Boise, ID	FS1	**BSU** 23–13		
November 13	2:00 p.m.	Hawaii	UNLV	Allegiant Stadium • Paradise, NV	Spectrum OC16 PPV	**UNLV** 27–13		
November 13	5:00 p.m.	New Mexico	Fresno State	Bulldog Stadium • Fresno, CA	Stadium	**FRES** 34–7		
November 13	5:00 p.m.	Air Force	Colorado State	Canvas Stadium • Fort Collins, CO (Rivalry)	CBSSN	**AF** 35–21		
November 13	8:30 p.m.	Nevada	San Diego State	Dignity Health Sports Park • Carson, CA	CBSSN	**SDSU** 23–21		
November 13	8:30 p.m.	Utah State	San Jose State	CEFCU Stadium • San Jose, CA	FS1	**USU** 48–17		
^{#}Rankings from AP Poll released prior to game. All times are in Mountain Time.

==== Week twelve ====
Date	Time	Visiting team	Home team	Site	TV	Result	Attendance	Ref.
November 19	7:00 p.m.	**Air Force**	**Nevada**	Mackay Stadium • Reno, NV	FS1	**AF** 41–39 ^{3OT}		
November 19	9:30 p.m.	No. 23 **San Diego State**	**UNLV**	Allegiant Stadium • Paradise, NV	CBSSN	**SDSU** 28–20		
November 20	6:00 p.m.	**Wyoming**	**Utah State**	Maverik Stadium • Logan, UT (Rivalry)	CBSSN	**WYO** 44–17		
November 20	7:00 p.m.	**New Mexico**	**Boise State**	Albertsons Stadium • Boise, ID	FS1	**BSU** 37–0		
November 20	9:00 p.m.	**Colorado State**	**Hawaii**	Clarence T. C. Ching Athletics Complex • Honolulu, HI	Spectrum OC16 PPV	**HAW** 50–45		
^{#}Rankings from AP Poll released prior to game. All times are in Mountain Time.

Date	Bye Week	
November 20	Fresno State	San Jose State

==== Week thirteen ====
Date	Time	Visiting team	Home team	Site	TV	Result	Attendance	Ref.
November 25	1:30 p.m.	Fresno State	**San Jose State**	CEFCU Stadium • San Jose, CA (Rivalry)	FS1	**FRES** 40–9		
November 26	10:00 a.m.	Boise State	No. 22 **San Diego State**	Dignity Health Sports Park • Carson, CA	CBS	**SDSU** 27–16		
November 26	11:00 a.m.	Utah State	**New Mexico**	University Stadium • Albuquerque, NM	FS1	**USU** 35–10		
November 26	1:30 p.m.	UNLV	**Air Force**	Falcon Stadium • Colorado Springs, CO	CBSSN	**AF** 48–14		
November 27	1:00 p.m.	Hawaii	**Wyoming**	War Memorial Stadium • Laramie, WY (Rivalry)	Spectrum OC16 PPV	**HAW** 38–14		
November 27	7:00 p.m.	Nevada	**Colorado State**	Canvas Stadium • Fort Collins, CO	CBSSN	**NEV** 52–10		
^{#}Rankings from AP Poll released prior to game. All times are in Mountain Time.

==== Week fourteen ====
Date	Time	Visiting team	Home team	Site	TV	Result	Attendance	Ref.
December 4	1:00 p.m.	**Utah State**	**San Diego State**	Dignity Health Sports Park • San Diego, CA	FOX	**USU** 46–13		
^{#}Rankings from AP Poll released prior to game. All times are in Mountain Time.

== Postseason ==
=== Bowl Games ===
Legend
Mountain West win
Mountain West loss

Bowl game	Date	Site	Television	Time (MST)	Mountain West team	Opponent	Score	Attendance
New Mexico Bowl	December 18	University Stadium • Albuquerque, NM	ESPN	12:15 p.m.	Fresno State	UTEP	W 31–24	16,422
LA Bowl	December 18	SoFi Stadium • Inglewood, CA	ABC	5:30 p.m.	Utah State	Oregon State	W 24–13	29,896
Famous Idaho Potato Bowl	December 21	Albertsons Stadium • Boise, ID	ESPN	1:30 p.m.	Wyoming	Kent State	W 52–38	10,217
Frisco Bowl	December 21	Toyota Stadium • Frisco, TX	ESPN	5:30 p.m.	San Diego State	UTSA	W 38–24	15,801
Quick Lane Bowl	December 27	Ford Field • Detroit, MI	ESPN	9:00 a.m.	Nevada	Western Michigan	L 24–52	22,321
First Responder Bowl	December 28	Gerald J. Ford Stadium • University Park, TX	ESPN	1:15 p.m.	Air Force	Louisville	W 31–28	15,251

- Hawaii was originally slated to play in the Hawaii Bowl against Memphis on December 24. The team was forced to withdraw from the bowl game due to a shortage of available players, stemming from a combination of a COVID-19 outbreak within the team, players already out with injury, and players who transferred away from the school at the conclusion of the regular season.
- Boise State was originally slated to play in the Arizona Bowl against Central Michigan on December 31. The team was forced to withdraw from the bowl game due to a COVID-19 outbreak within the team. The Arizona Bowl was cancelled, and Central Michigan was instead invited to move to a vacated spot in the Sun Bowl.

== Mountain West records vs other conferences ==
2021–2022 records against non-conference foes:

Regular season

Power 5 Conferences	Record
ACC	0–0
Big Ten	0–1
Big 12	0–3
Pac-12	5–5
BYU/Notre Dame	1–1
SEC	0–2
Power 5 Total	6–12
Other FBS Conferences	Record
American	1–1
C–USA	1–2
Independents (Excluding BYU & Notre Dame)	8–1
MAC	3–1
Sun Belt	0–0
Other FBS Total	13–5
FCS Opponents	Record
Football Championship Subdivision	9–2
Total Non-Conference Record	28–19

Post Season

Power 5 Conferences	Record
ACC	0–0
Big Ten	0–0
Big 12	0–0
Pac-12	0–0
BYU/Notre Dame	0–0
SEC	0–0
Power 5 Total	0–0
Other FBS Conferences	Record
American	0–0
C–USA	0–0
Independents (Excluding BYU & Notre Dame)	0–0
MAC	0–0
Sun Belt	0–0
Other FBS Total	0–0
Total Bowl Record	0–0

=== Mountain West vs Power Five matchups ===
The following games include Pac-12 teams competing against Power Five conferences teams from the (ACC, Big Ten, Big 12, Notre Dame, BYU and SEC). All rankings are from the AP Poll at the time of the game.

Date	Conference	Visitor	Home	Site	Score
August 28	Pac-12	Hawaii	UCLA	Rose Bowl • Pasadena, CA	L 10–44
September 4	Pac-12	Fresno State	No. 11 Oregon	Autzen Stadium • Fresno, CA	L 24–31
September 4	Pac-12	San Jose State	No. 15 USC	Los Angeles Memorial Coliseum • Los Angeles, CA	L 7–30
September 4	Pac-12	Nevada	California	California Memorial Stadium • Berkeley, CA	W 22–17
September 4	Pac-12	Utah State	Washington State	Martin Stadium • Pullman, WA	W 26–23
September 11	Pac-12	San Diego State	Arizona	Arizona Stadium • Tucson, AZ	W 38–14
September 11	SEC	Vanderbilt	Colorado State	Canvas Stadium • Fort Collins, CO	L 21–24
September 11	Pac-12	UNLV	No. 23 Arizona State	Sun Devil Stadium • Tempe, AZ	L 10–37
September 11	Pac-12	Hawaii	Oregon State	Reser Stadium • Corvallis, OR	L 27–45
September 18	SEC	New Mexico	No. 7 Texas A&M	Kyle Field • College Station, TX	L 0–34
September 18	Big 12	Nevada	Kansas State	Bill Snyder Family Football Stadium • Manhattan, KS	L 17–38
September 18	Pac-12	Utah	San Diego State	Dignity Health Sports Park • Carson, CA	W 33–31 ^{OT}
September 18	Big 12	Oklahoma State	Boise State	Albertsons Stadium • Boise, ID	L 20–21
September 18	Big 12	No. 14 Iowa State	UNLV	Allegiant Stadium • Paradise, NV	L 3–48
September 18	Pac-12	Fresno State	No. 13 UCLA	Rose Bowl • Pasadena, CA	W 40–37
September 25	Big Ten	Colorado State	No. 5 Iowa	Kinnick Stadium • Iowa City, IA	L 14–24
October 1	Independent	No. 13 BYU	Utah State	Maverik Stadium • Logan, UT	L 20–34
October 9	Independent	Boise State	No. 10 BYU	Lavell Edwards Stadium • Provo, UT	W 26–17

=== Mountain West vs Group of Five matchups ===
The following games include Mountain West teams competing against teams from the American, C-USA, MAC or Sun Belt.

Date	Conference	Visitor	Home	Site	Score
September 4	American	Boise State	UCF	Bounce House • Orlando, FL	L 31–36
September 10	C-USA	UTEP	Boise State	Albertsons Stadium • Boise, ID	W 54–13
September 10	MAC	Wyoming	Northern Illinois	Huskie Stadium • DeKalb, IL	W 50–43
September 11	American	Air Force	Navy	Navy–Marine Corps Memorial Stadium • Annapolis, MD	W 23–3
September 18	MAC	Ball State	Wyoming	War Memorial Stadium • Laramie, WY	W 45–12
September 18	MAC	Colorado State	Toledo	Glass Bowl • Toledo, OH	W 22–6
September 25	C-USA	New Mexico	UTEP	Sun Bowl • El Paso, TX	L 13–20
September 25	MAC	San Jose State	Western Michigan	Waldo Stadium • Kalamazoo, MI	L 3–23
September 25	C-USA	Florida Atlantic	Air Force	Falcon Stadium • Colorado Springs, CO	W 31–7
October 2	C-USA	UNLV	UTSA	Alamodome • San Antonio, TX	L 17–24

=== Mountain West vs FBS independents matchups ===
The following games include Mountain West teams competing against FBS Independents, which includes Army, Liberty, New Mexico State, UConn or UMass.

Date	Conference	Visitor	Home	Site	Score
August 28	Independent	UConn	Fresno State	Bulldog Stadium • Fresno, CA	W 45–0
September 4	Independent	New Mexico State	San Diego State	Dignity Health Sports Park • Carson, CA	W 28–10
September 11	Independent	New Mexico State	New Mexico	University Stadium • Albuquerque, NM	W 34–25
September 25	Independent	Wyoming	UConn	Rentschler Field • East Hartford, CT	W 24–22
September 25	Independent	Hawaii	New Mexico State	Aggie Memorial Stadium • Las Cruces, NM	W 41–21
October 2	Independent	New Mexico State	San Jose State	CEFCU Stadium • San Jose, CA	W 37–31
October 9	Independent	New Mexico State	Nevada	Mackay Stadium • Reno, NV	W 55–28
October 23	Independent	New Mexico State	Hawaii	Clarence T. C. Ching Athletics Complex • Honolulu, HI	W 48–34
November 6	Independent	Army	Air Force	Globe Life Field • Arlington, TX	L 14–21^{OT}

=== Mountain West vs FCS matchups ===
The Football Championship Subdivision comprises 13 conferences and two independent programs.

Date	Visitor	Home	Site	Score
August 28	Southern Utah	San Jose State	CEFCU Stadium • San Jose, CA	W 45–14
September 2	Houston Baptist	New Mexico	University Stadium • Albuquerque, NM	W 27–17
September 2	Eastern Washington	UNLV	Allegiant Stadium • Paradise, NV	L 33–35^{2OT}
September 3	South Dakota State	Colorado State	Canvas Stadium • Fort Collins, CO	L 23–42
September 4	Lafayette	Air Force	Falcon Stadium • Colorado Springs, CO	W 35–14
September 4	Montana State	Wyoming	War Memorial Stadium • Laramie, WY	W 19–16
September 4	Portland State	Hawaii	Clarence T. C. Ching Athletics Complex • Honolulu, HI	W 49–35
September 10	North Dakota	Utah State	Maverik Stadium • Logan, UT	W 48–24
September 10	Idaho State	Nevada	Mackay Stadium • Reno, NV	W 49–10
September 10	Cal Poly	Fresno State	Bulldog Stadium • Fresno, CA	W 63–10
September 25	Towson	San Diego State	Dignity Health Sports Park • Carson, CA	W 48–21

== Awards and honors ==
=== Player of the week honors ===
Week	Offensive			Defensive			Special Teams			Freshman		
Week	Player	Team	Position	Player	Team	Position	Player	Team	Position	Player	Team	Position
Week 0 (August 30)	Nick Starkel	San Jose State	QB	Aaron Mosby	Fresno State	DE	Will Hart	San Jose State	P	Cale Sanders Jr.	Fresno State	DB
Week 1 (September 6)	Carson Strong	Nevada	QB	Chad Muma	Wyoming	LB	Connor Coles	Utah State	K	Ralph Fawaz	Wyoming	P
Week 2 (September 13)	Terry Wilson Jr.	New Mexico	QB	Justin Rice	Utah State	LB	Kaegun Williams	San Diego State	KR	Seyi Oladipo	Boise State	S
Week 3 (September 20)	Jake Haener	Fresno State	QB	Justin Rice (2)	Utah State	LB	Cayden Camper	Colorado State	K	Jack Howell	Colorado State	DB
Week 4 (September 27)	Jalen Cropper	Fresno State	WR	Cameron Lockridge	Hawaii	DB	Matt Araiza	San Diego State	K/P	Noah Avinger	San Diego State	CB
Week 5 (October 4)	Toa Taua	Nevada	RB	Khoury Bethley	Hawaii	S	Brandon Talton	Nevada	K	Brayden Schager	Hawaii	QB
Week 6 (October 11)	Carson Strong (2)	Nevada	QB	Vince Sanford	Air Force	LB	Cayden Camper (2)	Colorado State	K	Kaonohi Kaniho	Boise State	CB
Week 7 (October 18)	Deven Thompkins	Utah State	WR	Shaq Bond	Utah State	S	Matt Araiza (2)	San Diego State	K/P	No selection		
Week 8 (October 25)	Jordan Mims	Fresno State	RB	Khoury Bethley (2)	Hawaii	S	Matt Araiza (3)	San Diego State	K/P	Isaiah Chavez	New Mexico	QB
Week 9 (November 1)	Jordan Mims (2)	Fresno State	RB	Evan Williams	Fresno State	S	Brandon Talton (2)	Nevada	K	Ralph Fawaz (2)	Wyoming	P
Week 10 (November 8)	Deven Thompkins (2)	Utah State	WR	Chad Muma (2)	Wyoming	LB	Jonah Dalmas	Boise State	K	Cameron Friel	UNLV	QB
Week 11 (November 15)	Charles Williams	UNLV	RB	Cameron Thomas	San Diego State	DE	Matt Araiza (4)	San Diego State	K/P	Aaron Dumas	New Mexico	RB
Week 12 (November 22)	DeAndre Hughes	Air Force	RB	Darius Muasau	Hawaii	LB	Cameron Stone	Wyoming	KR	Jack Howell (2)	Colorado State	DB
Week 13 (November 29)	Chevan Cordeiro	Hawaii	QB	Patrick McMorris	San Diego State	S	Matthew Shipley	Hawaii	P/K	No selection		

=== Mountain West Individual Awards ===
The following individuals received postseason honors as voted by the Mountain West Conference football coaches at the end of the season.

Award	Player	School
Offensive Player of the Year	Carson Strong, Jr., QB	Nevada
Defensive Player of the Year	Cameron Thomas, Jr., DL	San Diego State
Special Teams Player of the Year	Matt Araiza, K/P	San Diego State
Freshman Player of the Year	Cameron Friel, QB	UNLV
Coach of the Year	Brady Hoke	San Diego State

=== All-conference teams ===
The following players were selected as part of the Mountain West's All-Conference Teams.

Position	Player	Team
First Team Offense
WR	Khalil Shakir	Boise State
WR	Romeo Doubs	Nevada
WR	Deven Thompkins	Utah State
OL	Hawk Wimmer	Air Force
OL	John Ojukwu	Boise State
OL	Alex Akingbulu	Fresno State
OL	William Dunkle	San Diego State
OL	Zachary Thomas	San Diego State
TE	Trey McBride	Colorado State
QB	Carson Strong	Nevada
RB	Brad Roberts	Air Force
RB	Charles Williams	UNLV
KR	Jordan Byrd	San Diego State
PK	Jonah Dalmas	Boise State
First Team Defense
DL	Scott Patchan	Colorado State
DL	Tristan Nichols	Nevada
DL	Cameron Thomas	San Diego State
DL	Viliami Fehoko	San Jose State
LB	Darius Muasau	Hawaii
LB	Caden McDonald	San Diego State
LB	Kyle Harmon	San Jose State
LB	Chad Muma	Wyoming
DB	Evan Williams	Fresno State
DB	Khoury Bethley	Hawaii
DB	Patrick McMorris	San Diego State
DB	Trenton Thompson	San Diego State
PR	Romeo Doubs	Nevada
P	Matt Araiza	San Diego State

Position	Player	Team
Second Team Offense
WR	Jalen Cropper	Fresno State
WR	Calvin Turner	Hawaii
WR	Isaiah Neyor	Wyoming
OL	Ben Dooley	Boise State
OL	Jake Stetz	Boise State
OL	Aaron Frost	Nevada
OL	Jack Snyder	San Jose State
OL	Keegan Cryder	Wyoming
TE	Cole Turner	Nevada
QB	Jake Haener	Fresno State
RB	Greg Bell	San Diego State
RB	Xazavian Valladay	Wyoming
KR	Savon Scarver	Utah State
PK	Matt Araiza	San Diego State
Second Team Defense
DL	Jordan Jackson	Air Force
DL	Scott Matlock	Boise State
DL	David Perales	Fresno State
DL	Keshawn Banks	San Diego State
LB	Vince Sanford	Air Force
LB	Daiyan Henley	Nevada
LB	Jacoby Windmon	UNLV
LB	Justin Rice	Utah State
DB	JL Skinner	Boise State
DB	Cortez Davis	Hawaii
DB	Tayler Hawkins	San Diego State
DB	C.J. Coldon	Wyoming
PR	Stefan Cobbs	Boise State
P	Ryan Stonehouse	Colorado State

=== All–Americans ===
The 2021 College Football All-America Teams are composed of the following College Football All-American first teams chosen by the following selector organizations: Associated Press (AP), Football Writers Association of America (FWAA), American Football Coaches Association (AFCA), Walter Camp Foundation (WCFF), The Sporting News (TSN), Sports Illustrated (SI), USA Today (USAT) ESPN, CBS Sports (CBS), FOX Sports (FOX) College Football News (CFN), Bleacher Report (BR), Scout.com, Phil Steele (PS), SB Nation (SB), Athlon Sports, Pro Football Focus (PFF) and Yahoo! Sports (Yahoo!).

Currently, the NCAA compiles consensus all-America teams in the sports of Division I-FBS football and Division I men's basketball using a point system computed from All-America teams named by coaches associations or media sources. The system consists of three points for a first-team honor, two points for second-team honor, and one point for third-team honor. Honorable mention and fourth team or lower recognitions are not accorded any points. Football consensus teams are compiled by position and the player accumulating the most points at each position is named first team consensus all-American. Currently, the NCAA recognizes All-Americans selected by the AP, AFCA, FWAA, TSN, and the WCFF to determine Consensus and Unanimous All-Americans. Any player named to the First Team by all five of the NCAA-recognized selectors is deemed a Unanimous All-American.

Position	Player	School	Selector	Unanimous	Consensus
First Team All-Americans
TE	Trey McBride	Colorado State	AFCA, AP, FWAA, TSN, WCFF	*	*
DE	Cameron Thomas	San Diego State	ESPN, The Athletic		
P	Matt Araiza	San Diego State	AFCA, AP, CBS, ESPN, FWAA, The Athletic, TSN, USAT, WCFF	*	*

Position	Player	School	Selector	Unanimous	Consensus
Second Team All-Americans
OL	William Dunkle	San Diego State	AP		
TE	Trey McBride	Colorado State	CBS		
DE	Cameron Thomas	San Diego State	AP, FWAA, TSN, USAT, WCFF		
LB	Chad Muma	Wyoming	WCFF		
P	Ryan Stonehouse	Colorado State	TSN		

Position	Player	School	Selector	Unanimous	Consensus
Third Team All-Americans
AP	Deven Thompkins	Utah State	AP		
LB	Chad Muma	Wyoming	AP		

=== National award winners ===
- John Mackey Award: Trey McBride, Colorado State
- Ray Guy Award: Matt Araiza, San Diego State

== NFL draft ==
The following list includes all Mountain West players who were drafted in the 2022 NFL draft.

Player	Position	School	Draft Round	Round Pick	Overall Pick	Team
Trey McBride	TE	Colorado State	2	23	55	Arizona Cardinals
Chad Muma	LB	Wyoming	3	6	70	Jacksonville Jaguars
Cameron Thomas	DE	San Diego State	3	23	87	Arizona Cardinals
Daniel Bellinger	TE	San Diego State	4	7	112	New York Giants
Romeo Doubs	WR	Nevada	4	27	132	Green Bay Packers
Khalil Shakir	WR	Boise State	5	5	148	Buffalo Bills
Cole Turner	TE	Nevada	5	6	149	Washington Commanders
DaRon Bland	CB	Fresno State	5	24	167	Dallas Cowboys
Matt Araiza	P	San Diego State	6	1	180	Buffalo Bills
Zachary Thomas	OT	San Diego State	6	7	186	Chicago Bears
Jordan Jackson	DT	Air Force	6	15	194	New Orleans Saints
