= Cole Turner (American football) =

American football player (born 2000)

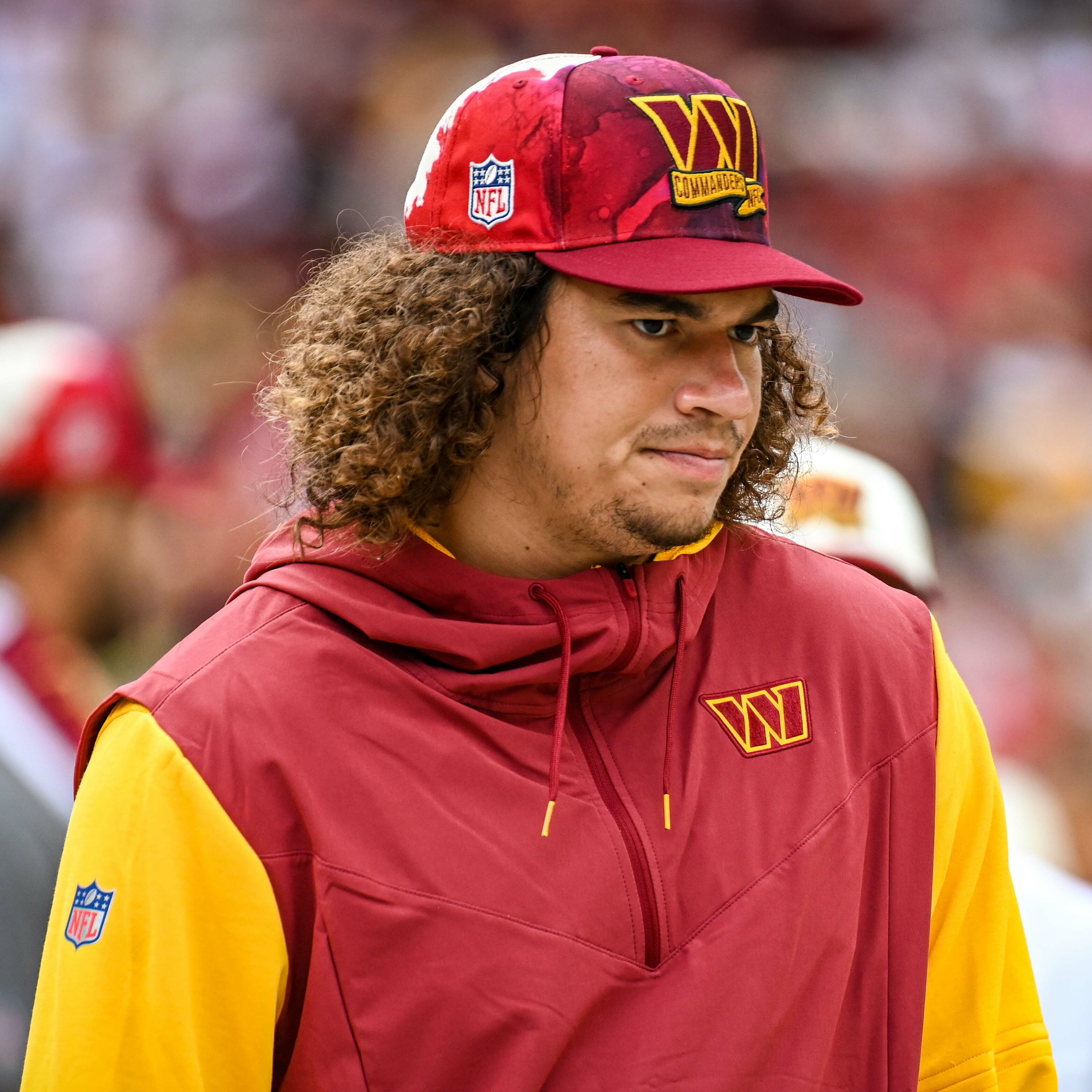
- Turner with the Washington Commanders in 2022

No. 87 – Miami Dolphins
- Position: Tight end
- Roster status: Injured reserve

Personal information
- Born: March 16, 2000 (age 26); Clackamas, Oregon, U.S.
- Listed height: 6 ft 6 in (1.98 m)
- Listed weight: 261 lb (118 kg)

Career information
- High school: Clackamas
- College: Nevada (2018–2021)
- NFL draft: 2022: 5th round, 149th overall pick

Career history
- Washington Commanders (2022–2024); Tennessee Titans (2025); Miami Dolphins (2026–present)

Awards and highlights
- First-team All-Mountain West (2020); Second-team All-Mountain West (2021)

Career NFL statistics as of 2025
- Receptions: 13
- Receiving yards: 143
- Stats at Pro Football Reference

Nicolas "Cole" Turner (born March 16, 2000) is an American professional football tight end for the Miami Dolphins of the National Football League (NFL). He played college football for the Nevada Wolf Pack as a wide receiver before switching to tight end his senior season. Turner was selected by the Washington Commanders in the fifth round of the 2022 NFL draft.

== Early life ==
Turner was born on March 16, 2000, in Clackamas, Oregon. He attended Clackamas High School, where he was a two-sport athlete in football and basketball. He helped lead his football team to three consecutive conference titles and a state championship in 2017. He led the state of Oregon in receiving as a senior in 2017 with 76 receptions for 1,325 yards and 20 touchdowns, earning him all-state honors.

== College career ==
Turner enrolled at the University of Nevada, Reno in 2018 and appeared in 12 games as a freshman for the Nevada Wolf Pack football team as a wide receiver. He transitioned to tight end as a sophomore in 2020, where he was given first-team All-Mountain West Conference honors after recording nine touchdown catches and finishing second on the team in catches (49) and receiving yards (605) behind Romeo Doubs. As a senior in 2021, he was named to the All-Mountain West second-team after making 10 touchdown catches, which was tied for second in the nation among tight ends behind Georgia's Brock Bowers. He played in the 2022 Senior Bowl.

== Professional career ==
Pre-draft measurables
Height	Weight	Arm length	Hand span	Wingspan	40-yard dash	10-yard split	20-yard split	20-yard shuttle	Three-cone drill	Vertical jump	Broad jump	Bench press
6 ft 6 1/2 in (1.99 m)	249 lb (113 kg)	33 in (0.84 m)	9 7/8 in (0.25 m)	6 ft 6 1/4 in (1.99 m)	4.76 s	1.71 s	2.74 s	4.33 s	7.06 s	29.0 in (0.74 m)	10 ft 0 in (3.05 m)	17 reps
All values from NFL Combine/Pro Day

=== Washington Commanders ===
Turner was drafted by the Washington Commanders in the fifth round (149th overall) of the 2022 NFL draft and signed his four-year rookie contract on May 6, 2022.

On August 27, 2024, Turner was waived by the Commanders as part of final roster cuts and joined their practice squad the following day. On January 28, 2025, Turner signed a reserve/future contract with the Commanders.

On August 26, 2025, Turner was waived by the Commanders as part of final roster cuts.

=== Tennessee Titans ===
On December 9, 2025, Turner signed with the Tennessee Titans' practice squad. He made one appearance for the Titans, logging two special teams snaps in a 7–41 loss to the Jacksonville Jaguars in Week 18.

=== Miami Dolphins ===
On January 9, 2026, Turner signed a reserve/futures contract with the Miami Dolphins. He was waived/injured on August 26 and was placed on injured reserve the next day after going unclaimed.

== Personal life ==
Turner's given name is Nicolas but has preferred going by Cole since childhood. His father Kelly Turner played tight end for Purdue from 1987 to 1990.
