= Chad Muma =

American football player (born 1999)

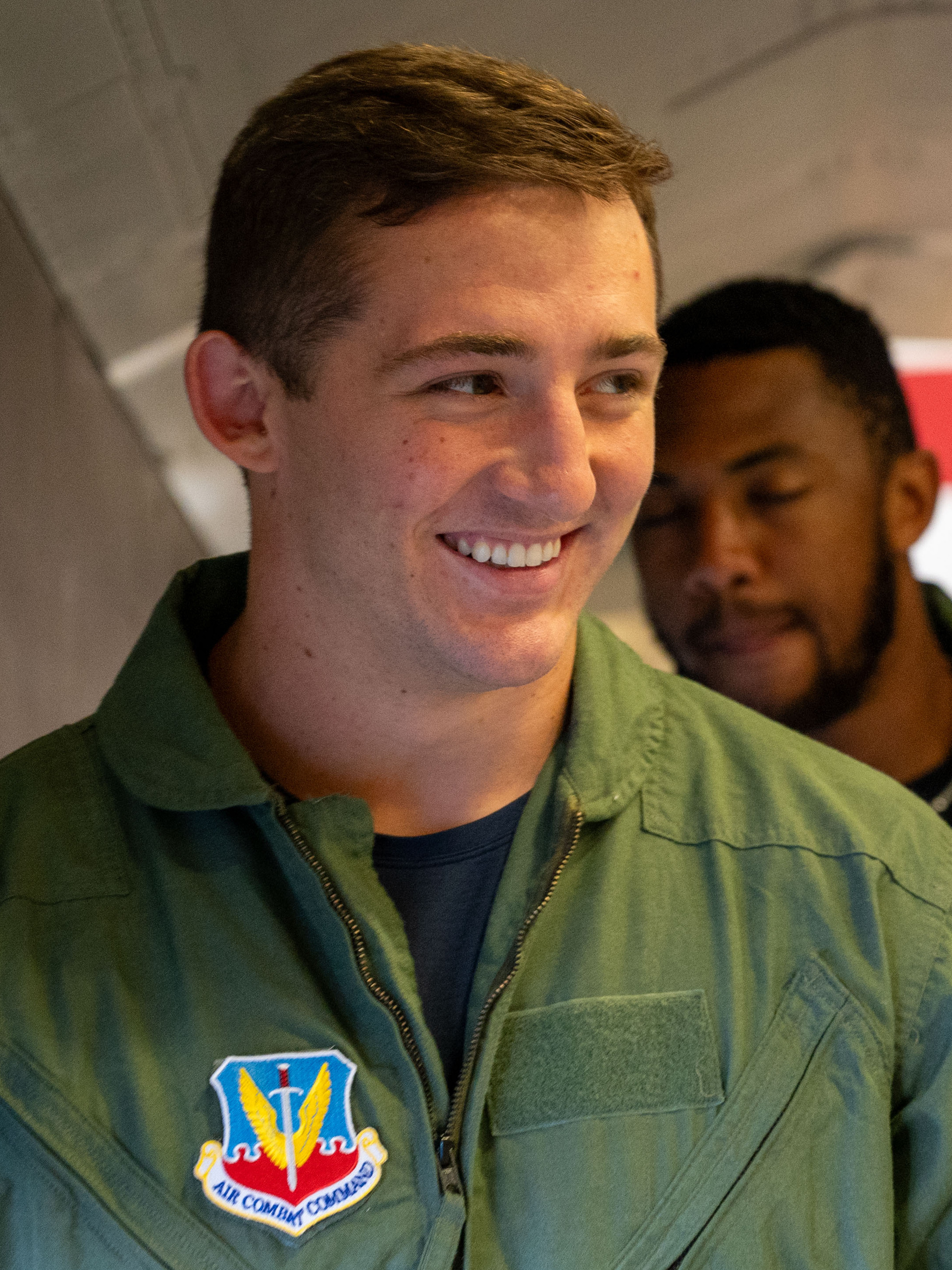
- Muma in 2023

No. 49 – Houston Texans
- Position: Linebacker
- Roster status: Practice squad

Personal information
- Born: August 18, 1999 (age 27); Denver, Colorado, U.S.
- Listed height: 6 ft 3 in (1.91 m)
- Listed weight: 239 lb (108 kg)

Career information
- High school: Legend (Parker, Colorado)
- College: Wyoming (2018–2021)
- NFL draft: 2022: 3rd round, 70th overall pick

Career history
- Jacksonville Jaguars (2022–2024); Indianapolis Colts (2025); New England Patriots (2025); Houston Texans (2026–present)

Awards and highlights
- Third-team All-American (2021); 2× First-team All-Mountain West (2020, 2021)

Career NFL statistics as of 2025
- Total tackles: 103
- Sacks: 1.5
- Pass deflections: 3
- Stats at Pro Football Reference

Chad Tyler Muma (born August 18, 1999) is an American professional football linebacker for the Houston Texans of the National Football League (NFL). He played college football for the Wyoming Cowboys and was selected by the Jacksonville Jaguars in the third round of the 2022 NFL draft.

== Early life ==
Muma grew up in Lone Tree, Colorado. He was diagnosed with Type 1 diabetes while in the seventh grade after losing 30 pounds. He also won homecoming king, Mr. Titan, in 2017. Muma attended Legend High School, where he initially played defensive back. He wore #19 out of respect for his father due to him also playing football. During his junior year, he broke his clavicle bone while playing 7-on-7, after surgery he excelled and played the entire year. He was named second-team Class 5A All-State as senior after finishing the season with 77 tackles and 8 tackles for loss despite missing half of Legend's games due to a seventy-percent torn patella. Muma committed to play college football at Wyoming, where his father and maternal grandfather had played, over offers from Colorado State, Hawaii and Nevada. Chad Muma also played Basketball his junior year. During the 2016–2017 season, he averaged 0.9 points per game, 1.0 rebounds per game, and 0.1 assists per game. Legend went on to be ranked 20th and made the 2017 CHSAA Boys Basketball State Championship Tournament. The team made it to the Sweet 16 before losing to Mountain Vista. Chad Muma continued with athletic by participating in Track and Field from 2015 to 2017. He performed in a multitude of events: 100 meter, 200 meter, 400 meter and Long Jump. His fastest time for all events came during his sophomore season where he ran 11.55, 23.32, and 54.18 respectfully. His farthest jump in Long Jump also came from his sophomore season when he jumped 20' 2.00".

== College career ==
Muma played in all 12 of Wyoming's games as a freshman, mostly on special teams. He began to see significant playing time on defense during his sophomore season and finished the year with 51 total tackles. As a junior, Muma led the Cowboys with 71 tackles, eight tackles for loss, and three sacks and was named first-team All-Mountain West Conference. For his senior season, he doubled his tackle output to 142, again had 8 tackles for loss, had 1.5 sacks, added 3 interceptions for 45 return yards, and a fumble recovery as well, en route to another All-Mountain West season. Muma was invited to play in the 2022 Senior Bowl and was named a finalist for the Butkus Award.

== Professional career ==
Pre-draft measurables
Height	Weight	Arm length	Hand span	Wingspan	40-yard dash	10-yard split	20-yard split	20-yard shuttle	Three-cone drill	Vertical jump	Broad jump	Bench press
6 ft 2 3/4 in (1.90 m)	239 lb (108 kg)	31 5/8 in (0.80 m)	10 in (0.25 m)	6 ft 3 3/4 in (1.92 m)	4.63 s	1.60 s	2.71 s	4.21 s	6.90 s	40.0 in (1.02 m)	10 ft 9 in (3.28 m)	27 reps
All values from NFL Combine/Pro Day

=== Jacksonville Jaguars ===
Muma was drafted in the third round (70th overall) of the 2022 NFL draft by the Jacksonville Jaguars. The Jaguars reportedly selected Muma after hearing that the Broncos were planning to draft him 75th overall. He was selected using a selection Jacksonville acquired in a trade with the Carolina Panthers. He was the fourth inside linebacker selected in the draft and the second inside linebacker selected by the Jaguars after they drafted Devin Lloyd in the first round. As a rookie, Muma appeared in 16 regular season games and started two. He finished with 1.5 sacks, 47 total tackles, and one pass defended. In the 2023 season, Muma appeared in 17 regular season games and started two. He finished with 15 tackles and two passes defended as a result of the Jaguars decision to permanently place Devin Lloyd as the main inside linebacker. In the 2024 season, he appeared in 17 games and started three. He finished with 32 tackles.

On August 26, 2025, Muma was waived by the Jaguars as part of final roster cuts.

=== Indianapolis Colts ===
On August 27, 2025, Muma was claimed off waivers by the Indianapolis Colts. He made five appearances for Indianapolis, recording five combined tackles. Muma was waived by the Colts on November 1, and re-signed to the practice squad.

=== New England Patriots ===
On December 16, 2025, Muma was signed to the active roster of the New England Patriots from the Colts' practice squad.

On August 30, 2026, Muma was released by the Patriots as a part of final roster cuts.

=== Houston Texans ===
On October 7, 2026, Muma signed to the Houston Texans practice squad.

== Personal life ==
Muma's father, Ty Muma, and his maternal grandfather, Rick Desmarais, also played college football at Wyoming. Chad's younger sister Payton played basketball at Gonzaga University from 2021–24 before transferring to the Wyoming Cowgirls basketball team. Chad's younger brother Jaxon plays football at the University of Sioux Falls.

Muma got engaged to his longtime girlfriend, Alyssa Huey, on May 28, 2023, in Saint Augustine, Florida. Together they own a Goldendoodle named Ollie.

During Muma's childhood, he learned how to play piano. In one specific case, during a school event, he performed "Great Balls of Fire" by Jerry Lee Lewis.

During mid-April 2017, Muma's Subaru Outback was stolen when he left the keys in the car. It was later found by police with his jersey and chest pads still inside.

== See also ==
- List of NCAA major college football yearly tackles leaders
