= Cameron Thomas (defensive end) =

American football player (born 2000)

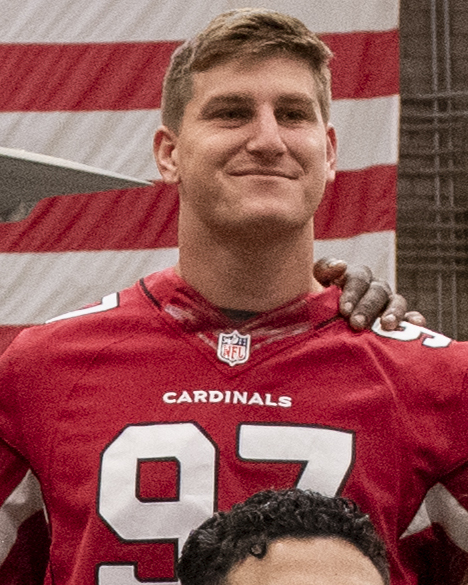
- Thomas with the Arizona Cardinals in 2022

No. 99 – Atlanta Falcons
- Position: Defensive end
- Roster status: Active

Personal information
- Born: January 7, 2000 (age 26); San Diego, California, U.S.
- Listed height: 6 ft 4 in (1.93 m)
- Listed weight: 265 lb (120 kg)

Career information
- High school: Carlsbad (Carlsbad, California)
- College: San Diego State (2018–2021)
- NFL draft: 2022: 3rd round, 87th overall pick

Career history
- Arizona Cardinals (2022–2023); Kansas City Chiefs (2024); Cleveland Browns (2024–2025); Atlanta Falcons (2026–present)

Awards and highlights
- Second team All-American (2021); MW Defensive Player of the Year (2021); 3× First-team All-MW (2019–2021)

Career NFL statistics as of Week 5, 2026
- Tackles: 95
- Sacks: 8.5
- Forced fumbles: 1
- Pass deflections: 3
- Fumble recoveries: 1
- Defensive touchdowns: 1
- Stats at Pro Football Reference

Cameron Thomas (born January 7, 2000) is an American professional football defensive end for the Atlanta Falcons of the National Football League (NFL). He played college football for the San Diego State Aztecs and was selected by the Arizona Cardinals in the third round of the 2022 NFL draft.

== Early life ==
Thomas was born on January 7, 2000 in San Diego, California and grew up in Carlsbad, California. He attended Carlsbad High School. He committed to play college football at San Diego State over offers from Oregon State, Wyoming and Navy.

== College career ==
Thomas redshirted his true freshman season. As a redshirt freshman, he was named first-team All-Mountain West Conference and a second-team freshman All-American by The Athletic after finishing the season with 49 tackles, nine tackles for loss, and 5.5 sacks. Thomas had four sacks and 9.5 tackles for loss and repeated as a first-team All-Mountain West selection in SDSU's COVID-19-shortened 2020 season.

Thomas repeated as a first-team All-Mountain West selection as a redshirt junior and was named the conference Defensive Player of the Year. Thomas was also named a second-team All-American by the Associated Press, Football Writers Association of America, Walter Camp Foundation, and the Sporting News.

== Professional career ==
Pre-draft measurables
Height	Weight	Arm length	Hand span	Wingspan	20-yard shuttle	Three-cone drill	Vertical jump	Broad jump	Bench press
6 ft 4 1/8 in (1.93 m)	267 lb (121 kg)	32 1/2 in (0.83 m)	10 1/4 in (0.26 m)	6 ft 6 7/8 in (2.00 m)	4.25 s	6.91 s	33.5 in (0.85 m)	9 ft 2 in (2.79 m)	24 reps
All values from NFL Combine/Pro Day

=== Arizona Cardinals ===
Thomas was selected in the third round (87th overall) by the Arizona Cardinals in the 2022 NFL draft.

=== Kansas City Chiefs ===
On August 27, 2024, Thomas was traded to the Kansas City Chiefs. He was waived on November 26.

=== Cleveland Browns ===
On November 27, 2024, Thomas was claimed off waivers by the Cleveland Browns.

=== Atlanta Falcons ===
On March 12, 2026, Thomas signed with the Atlanta Falcons. On November 12, Thomas signed a three-year contract extension with the Falcons worth up to $33 million, keeping him with the team through the 2029 season.

== NFL career statistics ==
Legend
	Led the league
**Bold**	Career high

=== Regular season ===
Year	Team	Games		Tackles					Interceptions						Fumbles				
Year	Team	GP	GS	Cmb	Solo	Ast	Sck	TFL	Int	Yds	Avg	Lng	TD	PD	FF	Fum	FR	Yds	TD
2022	ARI	17	0	18	7	11	**3.0**	3	0	0	0.0	0	0	**1**	0	0	0	0	0
2023	ARI	15	3	22	**13**	9	0.0	3	0	0	0.0	0	0	**1**	0	0	**1**	**2**	**1**
2024	KC	4	0	0	0	0	0.0	0	0	0	0.0	0	0	0	0	0	0	0	0
2024	CLE	5	0	11	6	5	1.0	**4**	0	0	0.0	0	0	0	0	0	0	0	0
2025	CLE	17	0	**28**	7	**21**	2.5	1	0	0	0.0	0	0	0	0	0	0	0	0
2026	ATL	5	5	16	7	9	2.0	1	0	0	0.0	0	0	1	1	0	0	0	0
Career		63	8	95	40	55	8.5	12	0	0	0.0	0	0	3	1	0	1	2	1
