= Savon Scarver =

American gridiron football player (born 1998)

Profile
- Position: Wide receiver

Personal information
- Born: December 23, 1998 (age 27); Las Vegas, Nevada, U.S.
- Listed height: 5 ft 11 in (1.80 m)
- Listed weight: 185 lb (84 kg)

Career information
- High school: Centennial (Las Vegas)
- College: Utah State (2017–2021)
- NFL draft: 2022: undrafted

Career history
- Chicago Bears (2022)*; Ottawa Redblacks (2022–2023); Toronto Argonauts (2024)*
- * Offseason or practice squad member only

Awards and highlights
- Jet Award (2018); Consensus All-American (2018); 2× First-team All-Mountain West (2018, 2019); Second-team All-MWC (2021)
- Stats at CFL.ca

Savon Scarver (born December 23, 1998) is an American professional football wide receiver. He previously played for the Ottawa Redblacks of the Canadian Football League (CFL). He played college football at Utah State.

== Early life ==
Scarver played high school football at Centennial High School in Las Vegas. Scarver was a three-star recruit coming out of high school and committed to play football at Utah State.

== College career ==
After recording 156 receiving yards, two receiving touchdowns, 742 return yards, and two return touchdowns, he was named a Consensus All-American as an all-purpose back. For his efforts, he was named the recipient of the 2018 Jet Award, given to the top return specialist in college football.

== Professional career ==
Pre-draft measurables
Height	Weight	Arm length	Hand span	Wingspan	40-yard dash	10-yard split	20-yard split	20-yard shuttle	Three-cone drill	Vertical jump	Broad jump	Bench press
5 ft 10 3/4 in (1.80 m)	184 lb (83 kg)	32 7/8 in (0.84 m)	9 7/8 in (0.25 m)	6 ft 5 in (1.96 m)	4.45 s	1.56 s	2.53 s	4.43 s	6.99 s	38.0 in (0.97 m)	10 ft 8 in (3.25 m)	14 reps
All values from Pro Day

=== Chicago Bears ===
Scarver signed with the Chicago Bears as an undrafted free agent on May 6, 2022, but was waived three days later.

=== Ottawa Redblacks ===
Scarver signed with the Ottawa Redblacks as a member of their practice squad on September 22, 2022, but did not play in a game in 2022. In 2023, Scarver played in the first five regular season games where he recorded seven receptions for 69 yards and three punt returns for 18 yards. He was then demoted to the practice roster and then later released on July 26, 2023.

=== Toronto Argonauts ===
On February 7, 2024, it was announced that Scarver had signed with the Toronto Argonauts. However, he was released during training camp on May 19, 2024.
