= Deven Thompkins =

American football player (born 1999)

No. 83 – Las Vegas Raiders
- Position: Wide receiver
- Roster status: Practice squad

Personal information
- Born: December 23, 1999 (age 26); Fort Myers, Florida, U.S.
- Listed height: 5 ft 8 in (1.73 m)
- Listed weight: 155 lb (70 kg)

Career information
- High school: Dunbar (Fort Myers)
- College: Utah State (2018–2021)
- NFL draft: 2022: undrafted

Career history
- Tampa Bay Buccaneers (2022–2023); Carolina Panthers (2024); Atlanta Falcons (2025); Buffalo Bills (2026)*; Las Vegas Raiders (2026–present)
- * Offseason or practice squad member only

Awards and highlights
- Third-team All-American (2021); First-team All-Mountain West (2021)

Career NFL statistics as of 2025
- Receptions: 29
- Receiving yards: 162
- Receiving touchdowns: 1
- Return yards: 1,373
- Stats at Pro Football Reference

Deven Thompkins (born December 23, 1999) is an American professional football wide receiver for the Las Vegas Raiders of the National Football League (NFL). He has previously played in the NFL for the Tampa Bay Buccaneers, Carolina Panthers, and Atlanta Falcons. He played college football for the Utah State Aggies.

== Early life ==
Thompkins graduated from Dunbar High School.

== College career ==
Thompkins was a member of the Utah State Aggies for four seasons. As a sophomore, he caught 40 passes. for 536 yards and four touchdowns. Thompkins played in four games during Utah State's COVID-19-shortened 2020 season and had 20 receptions for 214 yards and one touchdown. Following the end of the season, he entered the NCAA transfer portal. Thompkins ultimately decided to return to Utah State for the 2021 season. As a senior, Thompkins caught 102 passes for 1,704 yards with 10 touchdowns and was named first-team All-Mountain West Conference and a third-team All-American by the Associated Press.

== Professional career ==
Pre-draft measurables
Height	Weight	Arm length	Hand span	Wingspan	40-yard dash	10-yard split	20-yard split	20-yard shuttle	Three-cone drill	Vertical jump	Broad jump	Bench press
5 ft 6 7/8 in (1.70 m)	167 lb (76 kg)	30 1/2 in (0.77 m)	8 3/4 in (0.22 m)	5 ft 10 1/8 in (1.78 m)	4.44 s	1.53 s	2.56 s	4.18 s	6.98 s	38.5 in (0.98 m)	11 ft 0 in (3.35 m)	9 reps
All values from Pro Day

=== Tampa Bay Buccaneers ===
Thompkins signed with the Tampa Bay Buccaneers as an undrafted free agent on May 1, 2022. He was waived on August 30, and signed to the practice squad the next day. Thompkins was promoted to the active roster on December 23. He played in six games during the season, catching five passes while also returning six punts for 61 yards and 12 kickoffs for 263. In the Buccaneers' Wild Card Round loss to the Dallas Cowboys, Thompkins returned three kickoffs for 58 yards and three punts for 34.

On May 30, 2024, Thompkins was waived by the Buccaneers.

=== Carolina Panthers ===
On July 25, 2024, Thompkins signed with the Carolina Panthers. He was waived/injured on August 11. He was re-signed to the practice squad on September 30. He was promoted to the active roster on November 23.

=== Atlanta Falcons ===
On September 23, 2025, Thompkins signed with the Atlanta Falcons' practice squad. He was promoted to the active roster on December 6. Thompkins was released by the Falcons on May 11, 2026.

=== Buffalo Bills ===
On June 11, 2026, Thompkins signed with the Buffalo Bills. He was released by the Bills on July 14.

=== Las Vegas Raiders ===
On July 27, 2026, Thompkins signed with the Las Vegas Raiders. Thompkins was released by the Raiders as a part of final roster cuts on August 30; he was re-signed to the team's practice squad the following day.

== Personal life ==
On June 21, 2024, Thompkins filed a suit against his estranged wife, Maria Castilhos for malicious and defamatory statements. The suit came after Castilhos accused Thompkins of physically abusing her, causing injuries to her face and arm.

== See also ==
- 2021 College Football All-America Team
