= Matt Araiza =

American football player (born 2000)

No. 14 – Kansas City Chiefs
- Position: Punter
- Roster status: Active

Personal information
- Born: May 16, 2000 (age 26); San Diego, California, U.S.
- Listed height: 6 ft 1 in (1.85 m)
- Listed weight: 200 lb (91 kg)

Career information
- High school: Rancho Bernardo (San Diego)
- College: San Diego State (2018–2021)
- NFL draft: 2022: 6th round, 180th overall pick

Career history
- Buffalo Bills (2022)*; Kansas City Chiefs (2024–present)
- * Offseason or practice squad member only

Awards and highlights
- Ray Guy Award (2021); Unanimous All-American (2021); MW Special Teams Player of the Year (2021); First-team All-MW (2021)

Career NFL statistics as of Week 10, 2026
- Punts: 150
- Punting yards: 7,316
- Punting average: 48.8
- Inside 20: 63
- Longest punt: 72
- Stats at Pro Football Reference

Matthew Ryan Araiza (born May 16, 2000) is an American professional football punter for the Kansas City Chiefs of the National Football League (NFL). He played college football for the San Diego State Aztecs, setting the National Collegiate Athletic Association (NCAA) season record for average punt yardage as a junior. Araiza entered the National Football League (NFL) as a sixth-round selection by the Buffalo Bills in the 2022 NFL draft, but he was released prior to the 2022 season after being accused in a lawsuit of gang rape. The San Diego County District Attorney declined to press criminal charges, citing a lack of evidence.

== Early life ==
Araiza grew up in San Diego, California, and attended Rancho Bernardo High School, where he played football and soccer, and was a hurdler on the track and field team. He made 37 field goals and was a two-time All-America selection as a placekicker. Araiza committed to play college football at San Diego State University (SDSU) over offers from the University of Massachusetts Amherst and the University of Montana.

== College career ==
At SDSU, Araiza was redshirted his true freshman season for the Aztecs. He served as the backup to All-Mountain West Conference kicker John Baron II. Araiza became the team's placekicker as a redshirt freshman and made a school-record 22 field goals on 26 attempts and was named honorable mention All-Mountain West. Araiza made 10 of 14 field goal attempts in SDSU's COVID-19-shortened 2020 season and was named honorable mention All-Mountain West for a second straight season. He assumed punting duties during the team's opening game against UNLV and averaged 49.8 yards on five punts.

In 2021, Araiza was named first-string punter in addition to his kicking duties going into his redshirt junior season and was named a midseason All-American by ESPN at the position. He finished the season averaging 51.19 yards per punt, breaking the NCAA record set by Texas A&M's Braden Mann in 2018 (50.98) and earning himself the nickname "Punt God" from fans. Araiza has stated that he does not "necessarily love the nickname", though he recognized it as a "huge compliment". Araiza won the Ray Guy Award as the top punter in the nation, and he became the second player in Aztecs history to be named a unanimous All-American. Following the end of the season, Araiza announced that he would be foregoing his final season of eligibility to enter the 2022 NFL draft.

== Professional career ==
Pre-draft measurables
Height	Weight	Arm length	Hand span	Wingspan	40-yard dash	10-yard split	20-yard split	Vertical jump	Broad jump
6 ft 1 1/8 in (1.86 m)	200 lb (91 kg)	30 1/2 in (0.77 m)	9 in (0.23 m)	6 ft 1 1/8 in (1.86 m)	4.68 s	1.59 s	2.71 s	32.0 in (0.81 m)	10 ft 1 in (3.07 m)
All values from NFL Combine

=== Buffalo Bills ===
The Buffalo Bills selected Araiza in the sixth round with the 180th overall pick of the 2022 NFL draft. He was the third punter selected in the draft, behind two others in the fourth round. As a rookie, he was named the Bills' starting punter following the release of veteran Matt Haack. Araiza did not dress for the Bills' final preseason game on August 26, 2022, one day after a lawsuit accusing him and two former SDSU teammates of rape became public. He was released the next day, on August 27. The Bills said they had become aware of the allegations against Araiza in July, after he was drafted.

=== Kansas City Chiefs ===
Araiza signed with the Kansas City Chiefs on February 22, 2024, after he had been dropped from the suit. In his first year in the NFL, Araiza was selected as an alternate in the Pro Bowl. Araiza played in Super Bowl LIX, punting 6 times for an average of 51.8 yards, which is a new Super Bowl record, as the Chiefs lost to the Philadelphia Eagles 22–40.

On April 20, 2026, Araiza re-signed with the Chiefs on a one-year contract. In Week 4 against the Las Vegas Raiders, Araiza averaged 47.6 yards per punt, placing one inside the 5-yard line, and also rushed for 12 yards on a fake punt and was named AFC Special Teams Player of the Week.

== NFL career statistics ==
=== Regular season ===
Year	Team	GP	Punting							
Year	Team	GP	Punts	Yds	Lng	Avg	Net Avg	Blk	Ins20	RetY
2024	KC	17	62	3,027	72	48.8	41.8	0	25	253
2025	KC	17	56	2,664	69	47.6	41.3	25	291	
2026	KC	9	32	1,625	69	50.8	41.8	0	13	208
Career		43	150	7,316	72	48.8	41.5	0	63	752

== Personal life ==
Araiza is of Mexican descent through his father who was born in Mexico.

=== Gang rape allegation ===
In 2022, Araiza was named as a defendant in a civil case in which two SDSU teammates and he were accused of gang raping a then-17-year-old girl, who was under the age of consent in California, at an off-campus party in 2021. Araiza has denied the allegations. His lawyer described the allegations as "a money grab" from the accuser, while she stated that she reported the incident the day after the alleged rape, before she was aware of Araiza's background.

The San Diego County District Attorney's Office did not file criminal charges against Araiza or the other two teammates, stating, "Ultimately, prosecutors determined it is clear the evidence does not support the filing of criminal charges and there is no path to a potential criminal conviction". Prior to the announcement, the office met with the accuser and her attorney to discuss their decision to not press charges. Based on witness statements and video evidence, the district attorney's office stated that Araiza could not have been involved as he had "left the party at 12:30 [am]", about 30 minutes before the first of about nine short videos of sex acts of the alleged encounter. The accuser's lawyer said that the witness was a "buddy". Araiza does not appear in the videos, each less than 10 seconds long. According to the accuser's lawyer, police had the accuser make a pretext phone call to Araiza wherein he admitted that they had sex, which he said was consensual, claimed that the accuser lied to him about her age, and said that he remained outside afterwards "for the rest of the party." On July 28, 2023, Araiza filed a defamation lawsuit against his accuser.

On December 12, 2023, Araiza and his accuser mutually agreed to drop their respective lawsuits against each other with neither party admitting any wrongdoing and no money changing hands. Araiza retained the right to sue his accuser's lawyer, Dan Gilleon, after a one-year cooling off period, a favorable ruling for a potential malicious prosecution claim. His accuser continued her case against the other defendants. In the summer of 2024, Araiza settled with Gilleon. Araiza said that "the settlement met my satisfaction"; the terms were not disclosed. "They made claims about me, and instead of caving to the demands and hiding those from the public, I decided to fight it in plain daylight and let all the facts come out", he said. Araiza stated that "if anything that was originally claimed had merit, I wouldn't have won at every turn."
