= Zachary Thomas (offensive lineman) =

American football player (born 1998)

Profile
- Position: Offensive tackle

Personal information
- Born: May 26, 1998 (age 28); San Diego, California, U.S.
- Listed height: 6 ft 5 in (1.96 m)
- Listed weight: 308 lb (140 kg)

Career information
- High school: Carlsbad (Carlsbad, California)
- College: San Diego State (2016–2021)
- NFL draft: 2022: 6th round, 186th overall pick

Career history
- Chicago Bears (2022)*; Los Angeles Rams (2022–2023); New England Patriots (2024); Houston Texans (2024); Indianapolis Colts (2025)*; San Francisco 49ers (2026)*; Tennessee Titans (2026)*
- * Offseason or practice squad member only

Awards and highlights
- First-team All-MW (2021); Second-team All-MW (2020)

Career NFL statistics as of 2025
- Games played: 17
- Games started: 0
- Stats at Pro Football Reference

Zachary Robert Thomas (born May 26, 1998) is an American professional football offensive tackle. He played college football for the San Diego State Aztecs and was selected by the Chicago Bears in the sixth round of the 2022 NFL draft.

== Professional career ==
Pre-draft measurables
Height	Weight	Arm length	Hand span	Wingspan	40-yard dash	10-yard split	20-yard split	20-yard shuttle	Three-cone drill	Vertical jump	Broad jump	Bench press
6 ft 4 7/8 in (1.95 m)	308 lb (140 kg)	33 7/8 in (0.86 m)	10 1/4 in (0.26 m)	6 ft 10 1/2 in (2.10 m)	4.96 s	1.67 s	2.84 s	4.65 s	7.40 s	22.5 in (0.57 m)	8 ft 11 in (2.72 m)	21 reps
All values from NFL Combine

=== Chicago Bears ===
Thomas was selected by the Chicago Bears with the 186th pick in the sixth round of the 2022 NFL draft. He was waived on August 31, 2022, and re-signed to the practice squad.

=== Los Angeles Rams ===
On November 18, 2022, Thomas signed with the Los Angeles Rams from the practice squad of the Bears. He was released on November 25, 2023, and re-signed three days later. He signed a reserve/future contract on January 15, 2024.

=== New England Patriots ===
Thomas was claimed off waivers by the New England Patriots on August 28, 2024. He was waived on November 5.

=== Houston Texans ===
On November 6, 2024, Thomas was claimed off waivers by the Houston Texans. During the remainder of the year, he appeared in six games for the Texans.

On March 12, 2025, Thomas re-signed with Houston on a one-year contract. He was waived on August 26 as part of final roster cuts.

=== Indianapolis Colts ===
On December 16, 2025, Thomas was signed to the Indianapolis Colts' practice squad. He was released on December 30.

=== Houston Gamblers ===
On January 13, 2026, Thomas was selected by the Houston Gamblers in the 2026 UFL Draft.

=== San Francisco 49ers ===
On January 21, 2026, Thomas signed a reserve/futures contract with the San Francisco 49ers. He was waived by San Francisco on July 17 with an injury designation.

=== Tennessee Titans ===
On July 23, 2026, Thomas signed with the Tennessee Titans. On August 30, he was waived by the Titans as a part of final roster cuts before the start of the regular season.
