= Romeo Doubs =

American football player (born 2000)

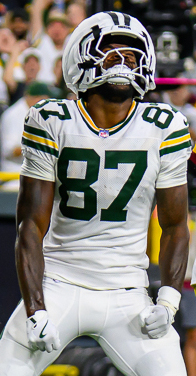
- Doubs in 2025 with the Green Bay Packers

No. 87 – New England Patriots
- Position: Wide receiver
- Roster status: Injured reserve

Personal information
- Born: April 13, 2000 (age 26); Los Angeles, California, U.S.
- Listed height: 6 ft 2 in (1.88 m)
- Listed weight: 210 lb (95 kg)

Career information
- High school: Jefferson (Los Angeles)
- College: Nevada (2018–2021)
- NFL draft: 2022: 4th round, 132nd overall pick

Career history
- Green Bay Packers (2022–2025); New England Patriots (2026–present)

Awards and highlights
- 2× first-team All-MW (2020, 2021)

Career NFL statistics as of Week 6, 2026
- Receptions: 216
- Receiving yards: 2,685
- Receiving touchdowns: 24
- Return yards: 133
- Stats at Pro Football Reference

Romeo Izziyh Doubs (/ˈdɒbz/ DOBZ; born April 13, 2000) is an American professional football wide receiver for the New England Patriots of the National Football League (NFL). He played college football for the Nevada Wolf Pack and was selected by the Green Bay Packers in the fourth round of the 2022 NFL draft.

== Early life ==
Doubs attended Jefferson High School in Los Angeles. He played quarterback and running back as well as wide receiver in high school. As a senior Doubs rushed for 1,757 yards and 28 touchdowns and he caught 13 passes for 354 yards and five touchdowns. He was listed as a three-star recruit by 247Sports.com and a two-star recruit by Rivals.com. He committed to the University of Nevada, Reno.

== College career ==
As a true freshman in 2018, Doubs had 43 pass receptions for 562 yards and two touchdowns. He also returned a punt 80 yards for a touchdown, in his first game vs Portland State. In Doubs' sophomore season, he played in ten games tallying 649 yards on 44 receptions for four touchdowns. After his performance he was named Nevada's team MVP. As a junior, Doubs had a 1,000-yard season where he also had nine touchdowns. He was named to the First team All-Mountain West Conference after leading the conference in receiving yards. In Doubs' senior year, he had a career best of 80 receptions, for 1109 yards, and eleven touchdowns. He was once again named to the First team All-Mountain West. In a game vs Fresno State, Doubs caught 19 passes tying the school record for most receptions in a game and being the most receptions in a game in the FBS that season. Doubs did not play in the 2021 Quick Lane Bowl and declared for the 2022 NFL draft. He played 43 games during his college career, recording 225 receptions for 3,322 yards and 26 touchdowns.

== Professional career ==
Pre-draft measurables
Height	Weight	Arm length	Hand span	Wingspan	Bench press
6 ft 1 7/8 in (1.88 m)	201 lb (91 kg)	32 1/4 in (0.82 m)	10 in (0.25 m)	6 ft 5 3/8 in (1.97 m)	13 reps
All values from NFL Combine/Pro Day

=== Green Bay Packers ===
==== 2022 ====
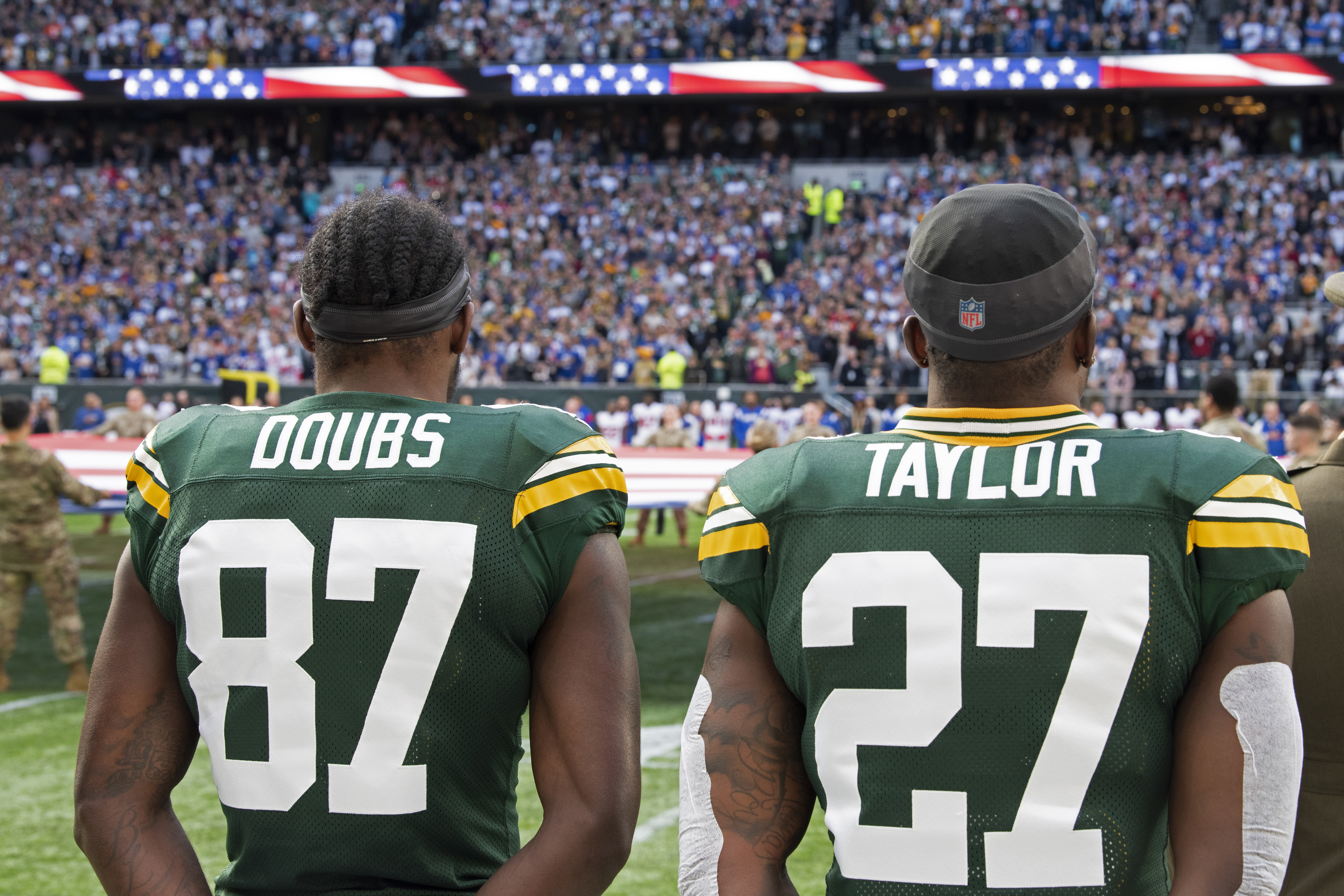
Doubs (left) playing for the Packers in 2022

Doubs was selected by the Green Bay Packers in the fourth round, 132nd overall, of the 2022 NFL draft. He signed his four-year rookie contract on May 26, 2022.

Throughout his rookie training camp, Doubs reportedly impressed both teammates and coaches. On August 12, he scored the first Packers touchdown of the preseason on a 29-yard pass from fellow Mountain West Conference alum Jordan Love. The following week, Doubs would catch another touchdown pass, adding to his preseason total.

Doubs had his NFL debut in a Week 1 loss against the Minnesota Vikings, finishing with four catches for 37 yards. In Week 3, he had a breakout performance in a victory over the Tampa Bay Buccaneers, catching all eight of his targets for 73 yards and his first career touchdown, a five-yard reception from Aaron Rodgers. Doubs was named the Pepsi NFL Rookie of the Week for his play. The following week, Doubs caught Rodgers' 500th career touchdown pass. He was also part of a controversial non-catch on a potential go-ahead touchdown pass from Rodgers. In Week 9, Doubs injured his ankle on the first play of the game, and missed the following four games. In his Week 15 return, he led the team in receiving yards, totaling five catches for 55 yards in a victory over the Los Angeles Rams.

Doubs finished his rookie year with 42 receptions for 425 yards and three receiving touchdowns, appearing in 13 games and seven starts.

==== 2023 ====
In Week 1 against the Chicago Bears, Doubs caught four passes for 26 yards and two receiving touchdowns during the 38–20 win. On September 24, Doubs caught the go-ahead touchdown, an eight-yard reception from Jordan Love, in a come-from-behind Week 3 victory against the New Orleans Saints. He finished the game with five receptions, for 73 yards, and a touchdown. He finished the 2023 season with 59 receptions for 674 yards and eight touchdowns. In the Wild Card Round against the Dallas Cowboys, he had six receptions for 151 yards and one touchdown in the 48–32 win.

==== 2024 ====
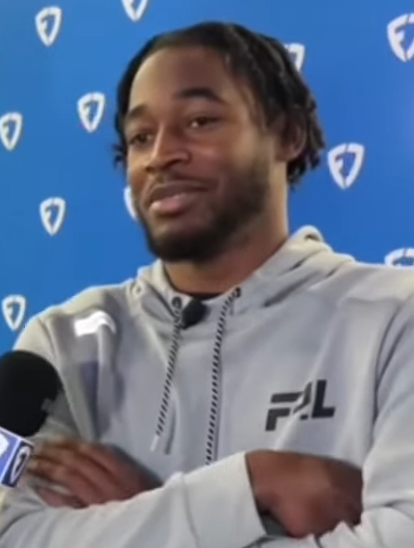
Doubs in 2024

On October 5, the Packers suspended Doubs from their Week 5 game against the Los Angeles Rams, after reportedly staying away from two days of practice due to frustration over lack of involvement in the team's passing game. Doubs would later state that he was dealing with "some things going on off the field" but that he could have done a better job of communicating with the team. Both sides expressed a desire to move forward after the incident. In his first game back from suspension, a Week 6 victory against the Arizona Cardinals, Doubs had two receiving touchdowns.

In the third quarter of a Week 12 win over the San Francisco 49ers, Doubs sustained a concussion while trying to make a catch in the end zone. He missed the next two games as he worked through concussion protocol but returned for the team's Week 15 game against the Seattle Seahawks, donning a Guardian Cap for extra protection, and caught two touchdowns. He finished the 2024 season with 46 receptions for 601 yards and four touchdowns.

Despite continuing to wear the Guardian Cap, Doubs sustained a second concussion in the team's Wild Card playoff loss to the Philadelphia Eagles on the road.

==== 2025 ====
In Week 4 against the Dallas Cowboys, Doubs caught a career-high three receiving touchdowns in the 40–40 tie. He finished the 2025 season with 55 receptions with a career-high of 724 yards and six touchdowns.

In his final game as a Packer in the wild card round of the NFC playoffs on the road against the Chicago Bears, Doubs led his team with eight catches on 11 targets for 124 yards and a touchdown. The Bears won the game 31–27, despite the Packers having led 21–3 at halftime.

=== New England Patriots ===
On March 12, 2026, Doubs signed a four-year, $68 million contract with the New England Patriots.

In Week 4 against the Buffalo Bills, Doubs recorded two receving touchdowns to go with six catches for 58 yards in the 29–26 win.

== Career statistics ==
=== NFL ===
Legend
**Bold**	Career high

==== Regular season ====
Year	Team	Games		Receiving					Punt returns					Kick returns					Fumbles	
Year	Team	GP	GS	Rec	Yds	Avg	Lng	TD	Ret	Yds	Avg	Lng	TD	Ret	Yds	Avg	Lng	TD	Fum	Lost
2022	GB	13	7	42	425	10.1	26	3	0	0	0.0	0	0	**2**	**39**	**19.5**	**21**	0	**2**	**1**
2023	GB	17	16	**59**	674	11.4	36	**8**	0	0	0.0	0	0	0	0	0.0	0	0	1	0
2024	GB	13	12	46	601	13.1	39	4	0	0	0.0	0	0	0	0	0.0	0	0	0	0
2025	GB	16	15	55	**724**	**13.2**	**48**	6	**15**	**94**	**6.3**	**16**	0	0	0	0.0	0	0	1	0
2026	NE	6	2	14	261	18.6	63	3	0	0	0.0	0	0	0	0	0.0	0	0	1	0
Total		65	52	216	2,685	12.4	63	24	15	94	6.3	16	0	2	39	19.5	21	0	5	1
Source: pro-football-reference.com

==== Postseason ====
Year	Team	Games		Receiving					Fumbles	
Year	Team	GP	GS	Rec	Yds	Avg	Lng	TD	Fum	Lost
2023	GB	2	2	**10**	**234**	**23.4**	**46**	**1**	0	0
2024	GB	1	1	2	13	6.5	7	0	0	0
2025	GB	1	1	8	124	15.5	34	**1**	0	0
Career		4	4	20	371	18.6	46	2	0	0
Source: pro-football-reference.com

=== College ===
Season	GP	Receiving			
Season	GP	Rec	Yds	Avg	TD
2018	13	43	562	13.1	2
2019	10	44	649	14.8	4
2020	9	58	1,002	**17.3**	9
2021	11	**80**	**1,109**	13.9	**11**
Career	43	225	3,322	14.8	26
Source: sports-reference.com
