= 2022 LA Bowl =

Postseason college football bowl game

2022 Jimmy Kimmel LA Bowl presented by Stifel
- 2nd LA Bowl
| Washington State Cougars | Fresno State Bulldogs |
| (7–5) | (9–4) |
| Pac-12 | MWC |
| 6 | 29 |
| Head coach: Jake Dickert | Head coach: Jeff Tedford |
| | 1 | 2 | 3 | 4 | Total |
|---|---|---|---|---|---|
| Washington State | 0 | 0 | 6 | 0 | 6 |
| Fresno State | 7 | 9 | 6 | 7 | 29 |
- Date: December 17, 2022
- Season: 2022
- Stadium: SoFi Stadium
- Location: Inglewood, California
- MVP: Offense: Jordan Mims (RB, Fresno State); Defense: Devo Bridges (DE, Fresno State)
- Favorite: Fresno State by 4
- Referee: Lee Hedrick (SEC)
- Attendance: 32,405

United States TV coverage
- Network: ABC
- Announcers: Joe Tessitore (play-by-play), Greg McElroy (analyst), and Molly McGrath (sideline)

International TV coverage
- Network: ESPN Deportes

The 2022 LA Bowl was a college football bowl game played on December 17, 2022, at SoFi Stadium in Inglewood, California. The second annual LA Bowl, the game featured Fresno State from the Mountain West Conference and Washington State from the Pac-12 Conference. The game began at 12:37 p.m. PST and aired on ABC. It was one of the 2022–23 bowl games concluding the 2022 FBS football season. Sponsored by late-night talk show host Jimmy Kimmel and independent investment bank Stifel, the game was officially known as the Jimmy Kimmel LA Bowl presented by Stifel.

== Teams ==
The LA Bowl featured the Washington State Cougars from the Pac-12 Conference and the Fresno State from the Mountain West Conference. This was the fifth meeting between Washington State and Fresno State, and Washington State entered the game leading the series three games to one. They first met in the 1987 season-opener, with Washington State winning 41–24; their last meeting came on September 10, 1994, in Pullman, with the Cougars winning 24–3.

Washington State made their 18th bowl appearance, with an 8–9 record in prior games. Their last bowl appearance came in the 2021 Sun Bowl. Fresno State, whose last bowl game was the 2021 New Mexico Bowl, made their 30th bowl appearance, with a prior record of 15–14. Both teams made their first LA Bowl appearance.

=== Washington State ===
Jake Dickert's second season at Washington State began with a rivalry matchup with Idaho, which the Cougars won by a touchdown. They earned another win the following week with an upset of No. 19 Wisconsin, and improved to 3–0 by beating Colorado State the next game. Their first loss of the season came in their Pac-12 opener, played at home against No. 15 Oregon, After defeating California for homecoming, the Cougars entered a three-game losing skid that started with a road contest at No. 6 USC, which Washington State lost by sixteen points. They then fell to Oregon State for the first time in eight games, and the third of their three consecutive losses came at home to No. 14 Utah by four points. Now 4–4, the Cougars turned the tides and went on a three game winning streak, starting with a dominant road win over Stanford and continuing at home against Arizona State, a win that earned the Cougars bowl eligibility. Their season's seventh win came the following Saturday at Arizona by eleven points, though they finished the campaign with a home loss in the Apple Cup to rivals No. 13 Washington. The Cougars entered the game with a record of 7–5 and a conference mark of 4–5.

Linebacker Daiyan Henley, who was named first-team all-Pac-12 on December 6, announced three days later that he would opt out of playing in the bowl game, with Dickert saying that Henley would serve as an assistant linebackers coach instead.

=== Fresno State ===
Fresno State kicked off their 2022 season with a home win against in-state FCS opponents Cal Poly, a four-touchdown win for the Bulldogs. Their first loss came the following week, as the Bulldogs fell at home by three points to Oregon State. A three-game road stretch followed, as the Bulldogs traveled to No. 7 USC and lost by four touchdowns, before falling by five points at UConn and dropping a rivalry matchup to Boise State by twenty. The Bulldogs put a stop to the losing streak with a homecoming victory over San Jose State, and won their first road game with a 41–9 showing against New Mexico the next week. Two touchdowns in the final 69 seconds of the Bulldogs' next game against San Diego State earned them a come-from-behind win that brought them back up to .500. Fresno State kept up their good form with a rout of Hawaii to begin November, and followed that up with a pair of road wins over UNLV, by seven points, and Nevada, by 27 points; the latter won them the MWC West Division title. The Bulldogs won their final regular season contest at home against Wyoming in a shutout, and faced Mountain Division champions Boise State in a rematch in the Mountain West Championship the next week. In their second game this season against the Broncos, Fresno State got the win by twelve points, earning them the conference championship. The Bulldogs entered the bowl game on an eight-game winning streak, with an overall record of 9–4 and a conference mark of 7–1.

The day following the conference championship, a pair of Bulldogs defenders–cornerback Cale Sanders and nickelback Emari Pait—entered the transfer portal rather than opting to play in the bowl game. A week later, wide receiver Josh Kelly announced that he was entering the transfer portal as well.

== Game summary ==
The game's officiating crew, representing the Southeastern Conference, was led by referee Lee Hedrick and umpire Michael Moten.

2022 Jimmy Kimmel LA Bowl presented by Stifel

| Quarter | 1 | 2 | 3 | 4 | Total |
|---|---|---|---|---|---|
| Washington State | 0 | 0 | 6 | 0 | 6 |
| Fresno State | 7 | 9 | 6 | 7 | 29 |

at SoFi Stadium • Inglewood, California

- Date: Saturday, December 17, 2022
- Game time: 12:30 p.m. PST
- Game weather: Sunny • Temperature: 65 °F (18 °C) • Wind: 3 mph (4.8 km/h) north
- Game attendance: 32,405
- Referee: Lee Hedrick
- TV announcers (ABC): Joe Tessitore (play-by-play), Greg McElroy (analyst), and Molly McGrath (sideline)
- Box score

Scoring summary

| Quarter | Time | Drive | | | Team | Scoring information | Score | |
| Quarter | Time | Plays | Yards | TOP | Team | Scoring information | Washington State | Fresno State |
|---|---|---|---|---|---|---|---|---|
| 1 | 11:54 | 6 | 75 | 3:06 | Fresno State | Zane Pope 22-yard touchdown reception from Jake Haener, Abraham Montano kick good | 0 | 7 |
| 2 | 12:46 | 4 | 23 | 2:00 | Fresno State | Jordan Mims 4-yard touchdown run, Andre Meono kick good | 0 | 14 |
| 2 | 11:14 | | | | Fresno State | Cam Ward tackled in end zone for a safety by Leonard Payne Jr. | 0 | 16 |
| 3 | 3:40 | 9 | 60 | 4:48 | Wash. State | Nakia Watson 1-yard touchdown run, 2-point pass incomplete | 6 | 16 |
| 3 | 0:36 | 6 | 75 | 3:04 | Fresno State | Nikko Remigio 11-yard touchdown reception from Jake Haener, Andre Meono kick failed | 6 | 22 |
| 4 | 8:29 | 8 | 38 | 4:42 | Fresno State | Jordan Mims 2-yard touchdown run, Abraham Montano kick good | 6 | 29 |
| "TOP" = time of possession. For other American football terms, see Glossary of American football. | | | | | | | 6 | 29 |

== Statistics ==
Team statistical comparison
| Statistic | Washington State | Fresno State |
|---|---|---|
| First downs | 13 | 28 |
| First downs rushing | 5 | 12 |
| First downs passing | 7 | 14 |
| First downs penalty | 1 | 2 |
| Third down efficiency | 4–14 | 6–12 |
| Fourth down efficiency | 1–3 | 0–1 |
| Total plays–net yards | 60–182 | 68–501 |
| Rushing attempts–net yards | 28–45 | 32–221 |
| Yards per rush | 1.6 | 6.9 |
| Yards passing | 137 | 280 |
| Pass completions–attempts | 22–32 | 24–36 |
| Interceptions thrown | 1 | 0 |
| Punt returns–total yards | 1–13 | 0–0 |
| Kickoff returns–total yards | 4–65 | 0–0 |
| Punts–average yardage | 5–48.2 | 4–38.5 |
| Fumbles–lost | 1–0 | 0–0 |
| Penalties–yards | 7–52 | 6–29 |
| Time of possession | 27:17 | 32:43 |

Washington State statistics
Cougars passing
| | C–A | Yds | TD–INT |
|---|---|---|---|
| Cam Ward | 22–32 | 137 | 0–1 |
Cougars rushing
| | Car | Yds | TD |
| Nakia Watson | 14 | 33 | 1 |
| Dylan Paine | 2 | 16 | 0 |
| Jaylen Jenkins | 1 | 0 | 0 |
| Cameron Ward | 11 | -4 | 0 |
Cougars receiving
| | Rec | Yds | TD |
| Robert Ferrel | 10 | 65 | 0 |
| Lincoln Victor | 5 | 29 | 0 |
| Billy Riviere III | 1 | 21 | 0 |
| Leyton Smithson | 3 | 18 | 0 |
| Nakia Watson | 1 | 5 | 0 |
| Tsion Nunnally | 1 | 4 | 0 |
| Renard Bell | 1 | -5 | 0 |

Fresno State statistics
Bulldogs passing
| | C–A | Yds | TD–INT |
|---|---|---|---|
| Jake Haener | 24–36 | 280 | 2–0 |
Bulldogs rushing
| | Car | Yds | TD |
| Jordan Mims | 18 | 209 | 2 |
| Malik Sherrod | 8 | 24 | 0 |
| Jake Haener | 6 | -12 | 0 |
Bulldogs receiving
| | Rec | Yds | TD |
| Nikko Remigio | 5 | 84 | 1 |
| Zane Pope | 4 | 62 | 1 |
| Jalen Cropper | 4 | 42 | 0 |
| Erik Brooks | 3 | 40 | 0 |
| Jordan Mims | 2 | 27 | 0 |
| Raymond Pauwels | 4 | 22 | 0 |
| Malik Sherrod | 1 | 3 | 0 |
| Mac Dalena | 1 | 0 | 0 |

== See also ==
- 2023 College Football Playoff National Championship, contested at the same venue on January 9, 2023
- Super Bowl LVI, the NFL championship contested at the same venue on February 13, 2022
