= 2022 Frisco Bowl =

Postseason college football bowl game

- 5th Frisco Bowl
| North Texas Mean Green | Boise State Broncos |
| (7–6) | (9–4) |
| C-USA | MWC |
| 32 | 35 |
| Head coach: Phil Bennett (interim) | Head coach: Andy Avalos |
| | 1 | 2 | 3 | 4 | Total |
|---|---|---|---|---|---|
| North Texas | 3 | 7 | 14 | 8 | 32 |
| Boise State | 0 | 6 | 22 | 7 | 35 |
- Date: December 17, 2022
- Season: 2022
- Stadium: Toyota Stadium
- Location: Frisco, Texas
- MVP: Taylen Green (QB, Boise State) & Ezekial Noa (LB, Boise State)
- Favorite: Boise State by 12
- Referee: Trennis Livingston (Sun Belt)
- Attendance: 12,211
- Payout: US$650,000

United States TV coverage
- Network: ESPN
- Announcers: Dave Neal (play-by-play), Deuce McAllister (analyst), and Andraya Carter (sideline)

The 2022 Frisco Bowl was a college football bowl game played on December 17, 2022, at Toyota Stadium in Frisco, Texas. The fifth annual Frisco Bowl, it featured Boise State of the Mountain West Conference and North Texas of Conference USA (C-USA). The game began at 8:25 p.m. CST and was aired on ESPN. It was one of the 2022–23 bowl games concluding the 2022 FBS football season.

== Teams ==
Based on conference tie-ins, the game will feature teams from any of the Group of Five conferences.

This was the seventh all-time meeting between Boise State and North Texas; going into the game, the all-time series was tied at 3-3. The Broncos and Mean Green were both members of the Big West Conference from 1996 until the conference ended its football sponsorship following the 2000 season.

=== North Texas Mean Green ===
The Mean Green, from Conference USA (C-USA), finished the regular season with a record of 7–5 (6–2 in conference play). The team tied with Western Kentucky for second in the conference, with their victory over the Hilltoppers securing the tiebreaker to advance to the C-USA Championship Game, in which they lost to UTSA 48-27. The team was coached by interim head coach Phil Bennett for this bowl game.

This was North Texas' final game as a member of C-USA, as the Mean Green were set to join the American Athletic Conference in 2023.

=== Boise State Broncos ===
Boise State represented the Mountain West Conference. This was the university's first appearance in the Frisco Bowl. The team was led by second year head coach Andy Avalos.

Boise State started 2-2 going into the fifth week into the season. They fired offensive coordinator Tim Plough on September 24, putting then senior analyst Dirk Koetter in the role. Starting quarterback Hank Bachmeier would transfer out of the program the next day, giving redshirt freshman Taylen Green the starting job. The team would finish the remainder of the season 7-1, before losing to Fresno State in the Mountain West Championship Game.

== Game summary ==
2022 Frisco Bowl

| Quarter | 1 | 2 | 3 | 4 | Total |
|---|---|---|---|---|---|
| North Texas | 3 | 7 | 14 | 8 | 32 |
| Boise State | 0 | 6 | 22 | 7 | 35 |

at Toyota Stadium • Frisco, Texas

- Date: Saturday, December 17, 2022
- Game time: 8:15 p.m. CST
- Game weather: Clear • Temperature: 39 °F (4 °C) • Wind: 1 mph (1.6 km/h) northeast
- Game attendance: 12,211
- Referee: Trennis Livingston
- TV announcers (ESPN): Dave Neal (play-by-play), Deuce McAllister (analyst), and Andraya Carter (sideline)
- Box score

Scoring summary

| Quarter | Time | Drive | | | Team | Scoring information | Score | |
| Quarter | Time | Plays | Yards | TOP | Team | Scoring information | North Texas | Boise State |
|---|---|---|---|---|---|---|---|---|
| 1 | 9:24 | 11 | 60 | 5:36 | North Texas | 27-yard field goal by Ethan Mooney | 3 | 0 |
| 2 | 9:58 | 6 | 8 | 2:19 | Boise State | 24-yard field goal by Jonah Dalmas | 3 | 3 |
| 2 | 7:38 | 6 | 65 | 2:20 | North Texas | Ikaika Ragsdale 1-yard touchdown run, Ethan Mooney kick good | 10 | 3 |
| 2 | 4:43 | 6 | 55 | 2:55 | Boise State | 37-yard field goal by Jonah Dalmas | 10 | 6 |
| 3 | 12:40 | 6 | 75 | 2:20 | Boise State | Taylen Green 3-yard touchdown run, 2-point pass good (Connor Riddle to Mason Hutton) | 10 | 14 |
| 3 | 8:32 | 10 | 71 | 4:08 | North Texas | Jake Roberts 17-yard touchdown reception from Stone Earle, Ethan Mooney kick good | 17 | 14 |
| 3 | 6:35 | 5 | 75 | 1:57 | Boise State | Eric McAlister 24-yard touchdown reception from Taylen Green, Jonah Dalmas kick good | 17 | 21 |
| 3 | 5:14 | 4 | 51 | 1:21 | North Texas | Jyaire Shorter 30-yard touchdown reception from Austin Aune, Ethan Mooney kick good | 24 | 21 |
| 3 | 0:25 | 10 | 75 | 4:49 | Boise State | Taylen Green 19-yard touchdown run, Jonah Dalmas kick good | 24 | 28 |
| 4 | 12:05 | 5 | 30 | 2:13 | Boise State | Ashton Jeanty 1-yard touchdown run, Jonah Dalmas kick good | 24 | 35 |
| 4 | 8:17 | 11 | 90 | 3:48 | North Texas | Ikaika Ragsdale 5-yard touchdown run, 2-point rush good (Austin Aune) | 32 | 35 |
| "TOP" = time of possession. For other American football terms, see Glossary of American football. | | | | | | | 32 | 35 |

== Statistics ==
Team statistical comparison
| Statistic | North Texas | Boise State |
|---|---|---|
| First downs | 23 | 23 |
| First downs rushing | 12 | 14 |
| First downs passing | 10 | 8 |
| First downs penalty | 1 | 1 |
| Third down efficiency | 9–18 | 5–13 |
| Fourth down efficiency | 2–3 | 1–2 |
| Total plays–net yards | 76–435 | 72–455 |
| Rushing attempts–net yards | 40–176 | 50–318 |
| Yards per rush | 4.4 | 6.4 |
| Yards passing | 259 | 137 |
| Pass completions–attempts | 19–36 | 13–22 |
| Interceptions thrown | 2 | 0 |
| Punt returns–total yards | 0–0 | 0–0 |
| Kickoff returns–total yards | 6–138 | 1–24 |
| Punts–average yardage | 4–38.0 | 4–31.3 |
| Fumbles–lost | 1–0 | 0–0 |
| Penalties–yards | 6–48 | 8–59 |
| Time of possession | 27:43 | 32:17 |

North Texas statistics
Mean Green passing
| | C–A | Yds | TD–INT |
|---|---|---|---|
| Austin Aune | 17–32 | 238 | 1–2 |
| Stone Earle | 2–4 | 21 | 1–0 |
Mean Green rushing
| | Car | Yds | TD |
| Ikaika Ragsdale | 21 | 94 | 2 |
| Ayo Adeyi | 14 | 67 | 0 |
| Stone Earle | 2 | 20 | 0 |
| Austin Aune | 2 | 0 | 0 |
| Kaylon Horton | 1 | −5 | 0 |
Mean Green receiving
| | Rec | Yds | TD |
| Jordan Smart | 3 | 94 | 0 |
| Damon Ward Jr. | 2 | 54 | 0 |
| Jyaire Shorter | 1 | 30 | 1 |
| Roderic Burns | 3 | 26 | 0 |
| Ikaika Ragsdale | 4 | 26 | 0 |
| Jake Roberts | 2 | 21 | 1 |
| Var'Keyes Gumms | 1 | 7 | 0 |
| Qualon Farrar | 1 | 1 | 0 |
| Kaylon Horton | 2 | 0 | 0 |

Boise State statistics
Broncos passing
| | C–A | Yds | TD–INT |
|---|---|---|---|
| Taylen Green | 13–22 | 137 | 1–0 |
Broncos rushing
| | Car | Yds | TD |
| Ashton Jeanty | 28 | 178 | 1 |
| Taylen Green | 12 | 119 | 2 |
| George Holani | 7 | 24 | 0 |
| TEAM | 3 | −3 | 0 |
Broncos receiving
| | Rec | Yds | TD |
| Latrell Caples | 6 | 87 | 0 |
| Eric McAlister | 1 | 24 | 1 |
| Billy Bowens | 2 | 13 | 0 |
| Ashton Jeanty | 1 | 10 | 0 |
| Riley Smith | 1 | 5 | 0 |
| George Holani | 2 | −2 | 0 |
