= Jordan Mims =

American football player (born 1999)

Profile
- Position: Running back

Personal information
- Born: June 16, 1999 (age 27); East Palo Alto, California, U.S.
- Listed height: 5 ft 10 in (1.78 m)
- Listed weight: 205 lb (93 kg)

Career information
- High school: Menlo-Atherton (Atherton, California)
- College: Fresno State (2017–2022)
- NFL draft: 2023: undrafted

Career history
- Buffalo Bills (2023)*; New Orleans Saints (2023–2024); Tennessee Titans (2025)*; San Francisco 49ers (2026)*; Minnesota Vikings (2026)*; Philadelphia Eagles (2026)*
- * Offseason or practice squad member only

Awards and highlights
- First-team All-Mountain West (2022); New Mexico Bowl Offensive MVP (2021)

Career NFL statistics as of 2025
- Rushing yards: 70
- Rushing average: 3.5
- Receptions: 12
- Receiving yards: 71
- Total tackles: 3
- Stats at Pro Football Reference

Jordan Mims (born June 16, 1999) is an American professional football running back. He played college football for the Fresno State Bulldogs and signed with the Buffalo Bills as an undrafted free agent in 2023. Mims has also played for the New Orleans Saints.

== Early life ==
Mims grew up in East Palo Alto, California and attended high school at Menlo-Atherton. He finished his high school career with 474 carries for 4,080 yards and 46 touchdowns to go along with 50 receptions for 687 yards and five touchdowns. Mims committed to play college football at Fresno State University over other schools such as Eastern Washington, Idaho, and San Jose State.

== College career ==
In Mims' first three seasons, he rushed 291 times for 1,203 yards and 13 touchdowns, while also bringing in 45 passes for 521 yards and three touchdowns. However, in 2021, Mims would breakout. He had a breakout game in Week 9, where he rushed for 186 yards and two touchdowns to help upset #21 San Diego State and hand them their first loss of the year, beating them 30–20. Mims also had a stellar performance in the team's bowl game where he rushed for 165 yards and two touchdowns along with hauling in five receptions for 71 yards and a touchdown. For his performance on the game, Mims was named the New Mexico Bowl Offensive MVP. He finished the 2021 season with 710 yards and six touchdowns while also racking up 25 receptions for 324 yards and four touchdowns.

Mims opened up the 2022 season hot, having a standout game in week two against Oregon State, where he rushed 21 times for 122 yards and two touchdowns. However, the Bulldogs would fall 35–32 as Oregon State fullback Jack Colletto scored a game winning touchdown. In week seven Mims had his best regular season performance as he would have 26 carries for 165 yards and a touchdown, as Mims helped the Bulldogs beat New Mexico 41–9. In Week 11, Mims had another great performance rushing 19 times for 156 yards and a touchdown as he helped lead Fresno State to another win beating Nevada 41–14. Just a week later in Fresno State's season finale, Mims rushed for three touchdowns to help beat Wyoming 30–0. In the Mountain West Conference Football Championship Game, Mims had an excellent game running for 83 yards and two touchdowns, as he helped the Bulldogs beat Boise State 28–16. In Fresno State's bowl game, Mims had the best game of his career rushing for 205 yards and two touchdowns, as Fresno State defeated Washington State 29–6 to win the LA Bowl. For his performance on the game, Mims was named the LA Bowl offensive MVP. Mims finished the year with his best year ever, carrying the ball 261 times for 1,372 yards and 18 touchdowns, while also bringing in 21 receptions for 126 yards and a touchdown. For his performance on the year, Mims was named First Team All Mountain West.

Mims finished his career in the Fresno State record books multiple times ending up fifth in all-purpose yards, fourth all-time in receptions by a running back, fourth all-time in rushing yards, tied for third all-time in rushing touchdowns, tied for third all-time in 150-yard rushing games, second all-time in rushing attempts, and second all-time scoring leader.

== Professional career ==
Pre-draft measurables
Height	Weight	Arm length	Hand span	Wingspan	40-yard dash	10-yard split	20-yard split	20-yard shuttle	Three-cone drill	Vertical jump	Broad jump	Bench press
5 ft 10 1/2 in (1.79 m)	206 lb (93 kg)	31 in (0.79 m)	9 3/8 in (0.24 m)	6 ft 4 in (1.93 m)	4.66 s	1.65 s	2.70 s	4.50 s	7.50 s	30.0 in (0.76 m)	9 ft 5 in (2.87 m)	18 reps
All values from Pro Day

=== Buffalo Bills ===
After not being selected in the 2023 NFL draft, Mims signed with the Buffalo Bills as an undrafted free agent. He was waived on August 29, 2023.

=== New Orleans Saints ===
On August 30, 2023, Mims was signed to the practice squad of the New Orleans Saints. He was promoted to the active roster on October 14 and made his regular season debut in a 20–13 loss to the Houston Texans, recording one tackle on special teams. Mims was waived five days later after running back Jamaal Williams was activated from injured reserve. On October 23, Mims was re-signed to the Saints practice squad. Following the end of the 2023 regular season, the Saints signed him to a reserve/future contract on January 8, 2024.

On October 26, 2024, Mims was waived by the Saints and re-signed to the practice squad. He was promoted to the active roster on November 2.

On May 12, 2025, Mims was waived by the Saints.

=== Tennessee Titans ===
On July 17, 2025, Mims signed a two-year contract with the Tennessee Titans. He was waived on August 26 as part of final roster cuts and re-signed to the practice squad the next day.

=== San Francisco 49ers ===
On May 28, 2026, Mims signed with the San Francisco 49ers. He was waived by San Francisco on June 10.

=== Minnesota Vikings ===
On July 28, 2026, Mims signed with the Minnesota Vikings. He was waived by the Vikings on August 12.

=== Philadelphia Eagles ===
On August 24, 2026, Mims signed with the Philadelphia Eagles. Mims was waived on by the Eagles on August 29 during final roster cuts.
