= Taylen Green =

American football player (born 2002)

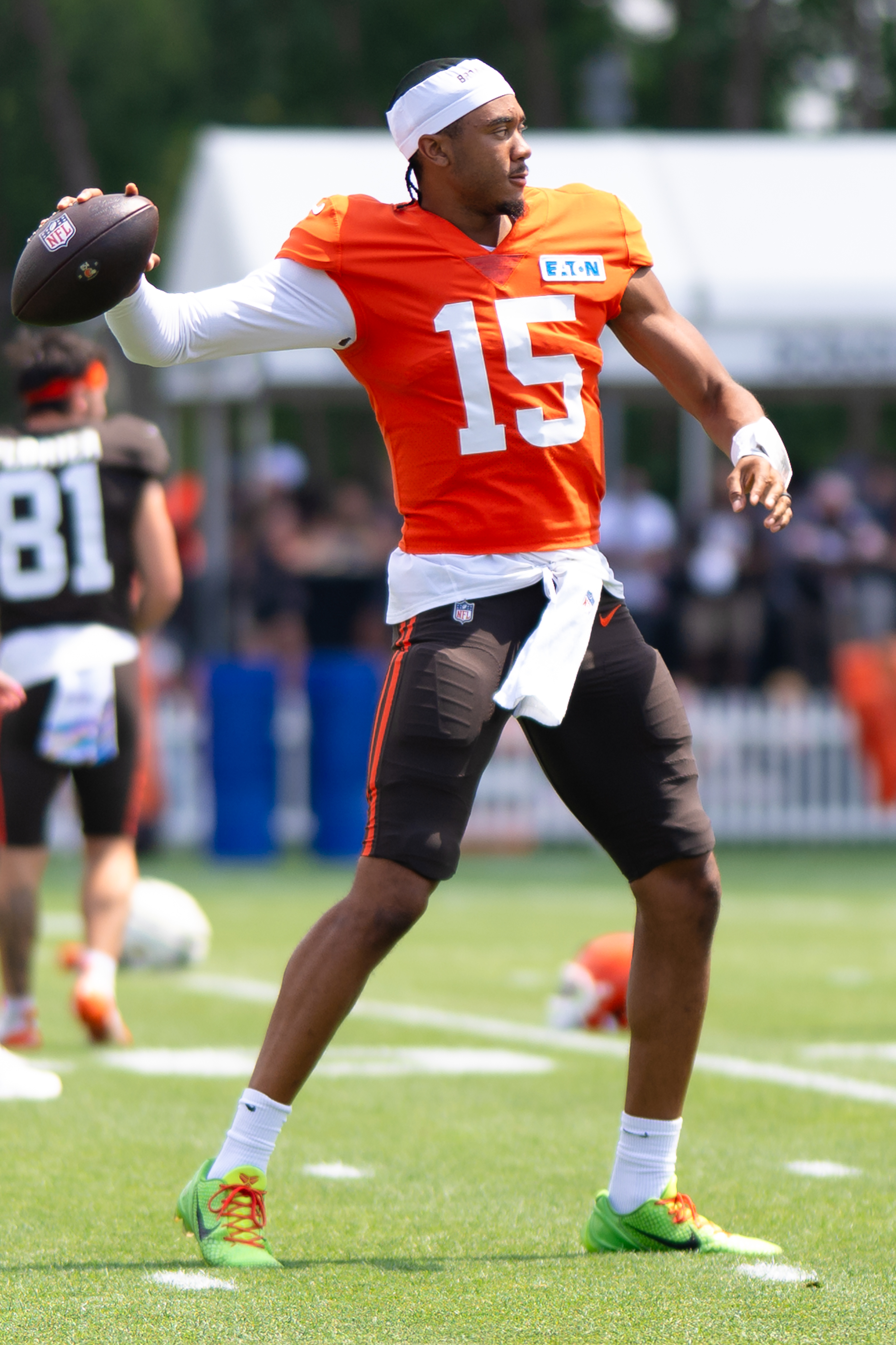
- Green with the Cleveland Browns in 2026

No. 15 – Cleveland Browns
- Position: Quarterback
- Roster status: Active

Personal information
- Born: October 18, 2002 (age 24)
- Listed height: 6 ft 6 in (1.98 m)
- Listed weight: 230 lb (104 kg)

Career information
- High school: Lewisville (Lewisville, Texas)
- College: Boise State (2021–2023); Arkansas (2024–2025)
- NFL draft: 2026: 6th round, 182nd overall pick

Career history
- Cleveland Browns (2026–present)

Awards and highlights
- MW Freshman of the Year (2022); 2022 Frisco Bowl (Offensive MVP); 2024 Liberty Bowl (MVP)
- Stats at Pro Football Reference

Taylen Green (born October 18, 2002) is an American professional football quarterback for the Cleveland Browns of the National Football League (NFL). He played college football for the Arkansas Razorbacks and the Boise State Broncos. He was selected by the Browns in the sixth round of the 2026 NFL draft.

== Early life ==
Green attended Lewisville High School in Lewisville, Texas. As a junior, he passed for 2,217 yards and 25 touchdowns. He committed to Boise State University to play college football.

== College career ==
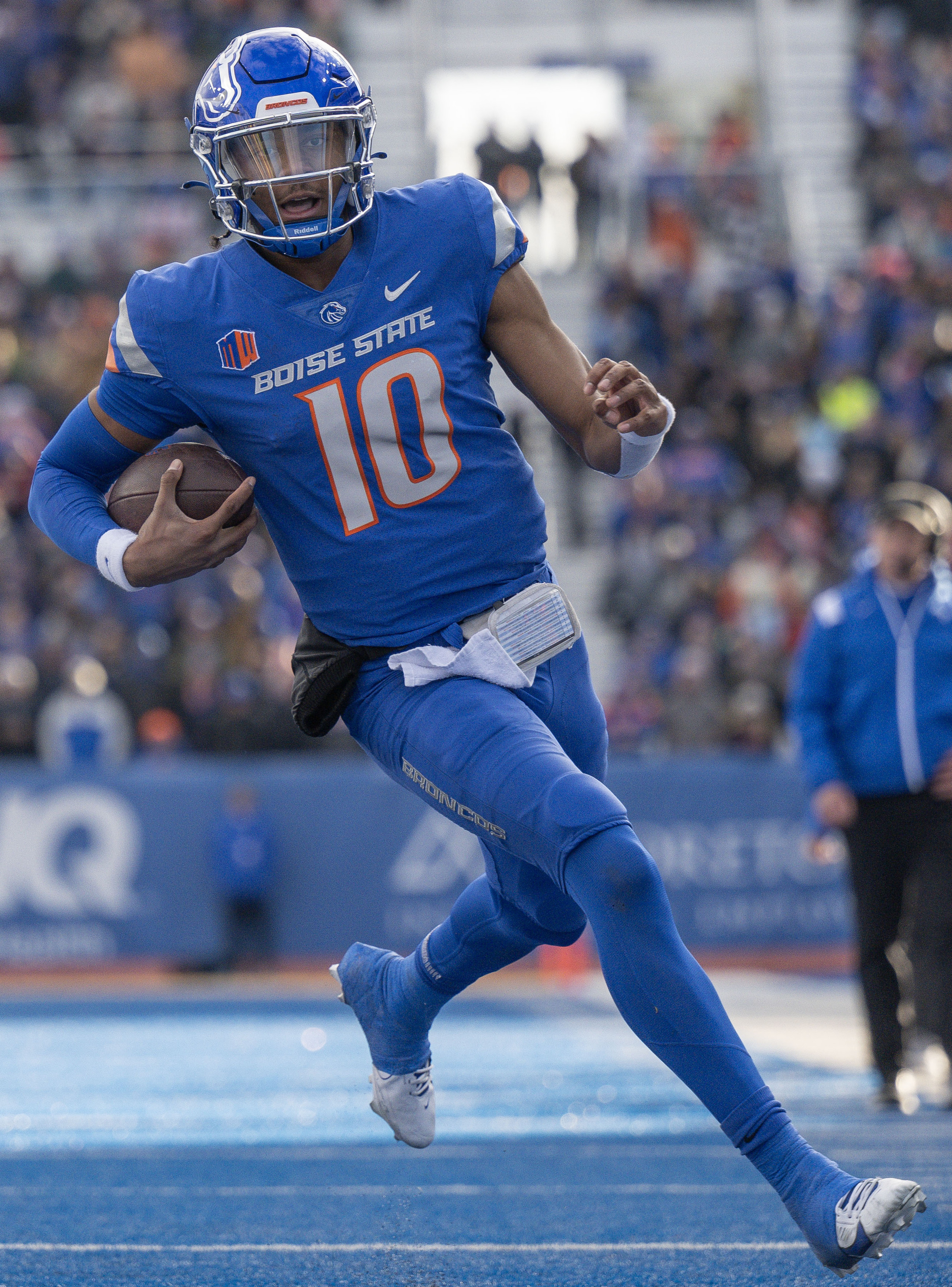
Green with Boise State in 2023

=== Boise State ===
Green played in two games as a backup to Hank Bachmeier his first year at Boise State in 2021. He started 2022 as the backup to Bachmeier, before becoming the starter after Bachmeier got injured, In his first career start in a 35–13 home win against the San Diego State Aztecs, he passed for just 48 yards but rushed for 105 with two touchdowns. He also led his team to the Mountain West Championship Game, against the Fresno State Bulldogs. However, they lost the game, 28–16. He also started in the Frisco Bowl against the North Texas Mean Green, winning that game, 35–32. Green led Boise State to the 2023 MWC championship beating the UNLV Rebels, 44–20, and was named the MWC championship game MVP. He entered the transfer portal on December 4, 2023.

=== Arkansas ===
On December 11, 2023, Green announced he was transferring to Arkansas. In his debut against the Arkansas-Pine Bluff Golden Lions, Green threw for 229 yards and two touchdowns through the air, as well as 88 yards and another two scores on the ground, winning the game, 70–0. In his next game against the 16th ranked Oklahoma State Cowboys, He threw for 416 yards and a touchdown, while adding 64 more yards rushing on 18 attempts, but lost 39–31, in overtime. He ran for 96 yards and two touchdowns in his next game against the UAB Blazers. On October 26, against the Mississippi State Bulldogs, he passed for 314 yards and five touchdowns, while also adding 79 yards rushing, leading the Razorbacks to a victory over the Bulldogs, 58–25. In the Liberty Bowl against the Texas Tech Red Raiders, he passed for 341 yards on only 11 completions with two passing touchdowns, and added 81 yards rushing and a touchdown on 15 attempts. The Razorbacks beat the Red Raiders 39–26, and Green was named the Liberty Bowl MVP. In 2024, he started every game and threw for 3,154 yards with 15 touchdowns, nine interceptions, while also adding 602 yards on the ground with eight rushing touchdowns.

Green elected to return to Arkansas for his senior season in 2025.

=== College statistics ===
Season	Team	Games		Passing									Rushing			
Season	Team	GP	GS	Record	Comp	Att	Pct	Yards	Avg	TD	Int	Rate	Att	Yards	Avg	TD
2021	Boise State	2	0	—	0	0	0.0	0	0.0	0	0	0.0	5	2	0.4	0
2022	Boise State	13	10	8–2	166	271	61.3	2,042	7.5	14	6	137.2	81	588	7.3	10
2023	Boise State	13	12	7–5	121	212	57.1	1,752	8.3	11	9	135.1	78	436	5.6	9
2024	Arkansas	13	13	7–6	230	381	60.4	3,154	8.3	15	9	138.2	156	602	3.9	8
2025	Arkansas	12	11	2–9	198	326	60.7	2,714	8.3	19	11	143.2	139	777	5.6	8
Career		53	46	24–22	715	1,190	60.1	9,662	8.1	59	35	138.8	459	2,405	5.2	35

== Professional career ==
Pre-draft measurables
Height	Weight	Arm length	Hand span	Wingspan	40-yard dash	10-yard split	20-yard split	Vertical jump	Broad jump
6 ft 5 7/8 in (1.98 m)	227 lb (103 kg)	34 3/4 in (0.88 m)	9 7/8 in (0.25 m)	6 ft 11 3/4 in (2.13 m)	4.36 s	1.55 s	2.57 s	43.5 in (1.10 m)	11 ft 2 in (3.40 m)
All values from NFL Combine

Green was selected in the sixth round, 182nd overall, by the Cleveland Browns in the 2026 NFL Draft, becoming the fourth quarterback on the roster ahead of the 2026 season.
