= 2022 Utah State Aggies football team =

American college football season

2022 Utah State Aggies football

First Responder Bowl, L 10–38 vs. Memphis
- Conference: Mountain West Conference
- Mountain Division
- Record: 6–7 (5–3 MW)
- Head coach: Blake Anderson (2nd season)
- Offensive coordinator: Anthony Tucker (2nd season)
- Offensive scheme: Spread
- Defensive coordinator: Ephraim Banda (2nd season)
- Base defense: 4–3
- Home stadium: Maverik Stadium

Uniform
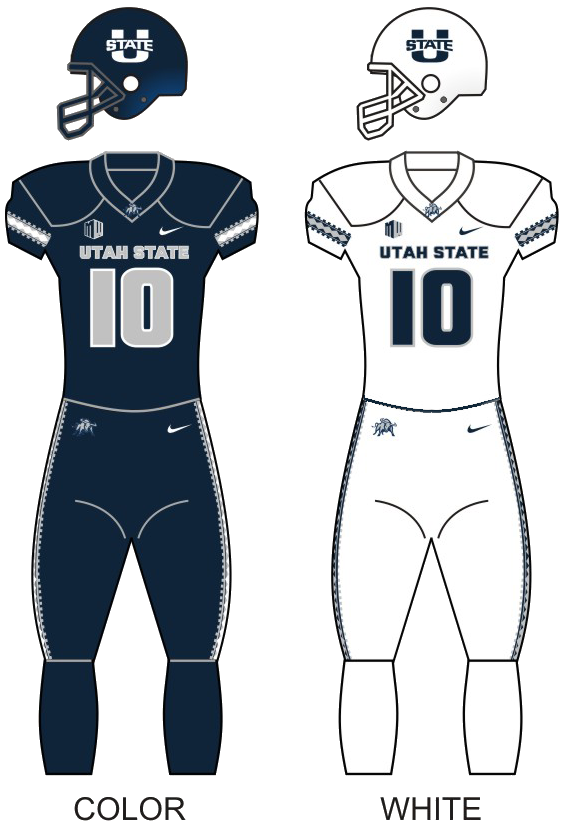

2022 Mountain West Conference football standings
	Conf.			Overall
Team	W		L	W		L
Mountain Division
Boise State xy	8	–	0	10	–	4
Air Force	5	–	3	10	–	3
Wyoming	5	–	3	7	–	6
Utah State	5	–	3	6	–	7
Colorado State	3	–	5	3	–	9
New Mexico	0	–	8	2	–	10
West Division
No. 24 Fresno State xy$	7	–	1	10	–	4
San Diego State	5	–	3	7	–	6
San Jose State	5	–	3	7	–	5
UNLV	3	–	5	5	–	7
Hawaii	2	–	6	3	–	10
Nevada	0	–	8	2	–	10
Championship: Fresno State 28, Boise State 16
$ – Conference champion; x – Division champion/co-champions; y – Championship game participant; Rankings from AP Poll

The 2022 Utah State Aggies football team represented Utah State University as a member of the Mountain Division of the Mountain West Conference during the 2022 NCAA Division I FBS football season. The Aggies were led by second-year head coach Blake Anderson and played their home games at Maverik Stadium in Logan, Utah.

The team was led on offense by quarterback Logan Bonner. Bonner opened the season with 281 passing yards and three passing touchdowns against UConn.

== Schedule ==
Date	Time	Opponent	Site	TV	Result	Attendance
August 27	2:00 p.m.	UConn*	Maverik Stadium; Logan, UT	FS1	W 31–20	19,553
September 3	5:30 p.m.	at No. 1 Alabama*	Bryant–Denny Stadium; Tuscaloosa, AL	SECN	L 0–55	98,321
September 10	5:00 p.m.	No. 16 (FCS) Weber State*	Maverik Stadium; Logan, UT	MW Network	L 7–35	17,781
September 24	5:00 p.m.	UNLV	Maverik Stadium; Logan, UT	CBSSN	L 24–34	17,454
September 29	6:00 p.m.	at No. 19 BYU*	LaVell Edwards Stadium; Provo, UT (Beehive Boot & The Old Wagon Wheel)	ESPN	L 26–38	59,417
October 8	5:00 p.m.	Air Force	Maverik Stadium; Logan, UT	FS1	W 34–27	19,105
October 15	5:00 p.m.	at Colorado State	Canvas Stadium; Fort Collins, CO	CBSSN	W 17–13	35,009
October 22	7:45 p.m.	at Wyoming	War Memorial Stadium; Laramie, WY (Bridgers Battle)	FS2	L 14–28	21,420
November 5	1:30 p.m.	New Mexico	Maverik Stadium; Logan, UT	CBSSN	W 27–10	14,154
November 12	10:00 p.m.	at Hawaii	Clarence T. C. Ching Athletics Complex; Honolulu, HI	SPEC PPV	W 41–34	8,862
November 19	7:45 p.m.	San Jose State	Maverik Stadium; Logan, UT	FS1	W 35–31	13,677
November 25	10:00 a.m.	at Boise State	Albertsons Stadium; Boise, ID	CBS	L 23–42	31,402
December 27	12:15 p.m.	vs. Memphis*	Gerald J. Ford Stadium; University Park, TX (First Responder Bowl)	ESPN	L 10–38	10,343
*Non-conference game; Rankings from AP Poll (and CFP Rankings, after November 1) - Released prior to game; All times are in Mountain time

== Game summaries ==
=== Vs. UConn Huskies ===
UConn Huskies at Utah State Aggies – Game summary

Quarter	1	2	3	4	Total
Huskies	14	0	0	6	20
Aggies	0	24	0	7	31

at Maverik Stadium • Logan, Utah

- Date: August 27
- Game time: 4:05 p.m.
- Game weather: Temperature: 85 °F (29 °C) • Wind: 14 SW • Weather: Sunny
- Game attendance: 19,553
- Referee: Derek Anderson
- TV announcers (FS1): Alex Faust (play-by-play) and Petros Papadakis (color analyst)
- Box Score

Game information

First quarter

- CONN – Ta'Quan Roberson 1 yd run (Noe Ruelas kick), 10:05. Huskies 7–0. Drive: 9 plays, 79 yards, TOP 03:05
- CONN – Keelan Marion 13 yd pass from Zion Turner (Noe Ruelas kick), 1:38. Huskies 14–0. Drive: 4 plays, 79 yards, TOP 01:48

Second quarter

- USU – Kyle Van Leeuwen 11-yard pass from Logan Bonner (Connor Coles kick), 12:28. Huskies 14–7. Drive: 5 plays, 45 yards, TOP 01:40
- USU – Robert Briggs 23-yard run (Connor Coles kick), 3:42. Tied 14–14. Drive: 7 plays, 86 yards, TOP 02:53
- USU – Justin McGriff 14-yard pass from Logan Bonner (Connor Coles kick), 1:48. Aggies 21–14. Drive: 4 plays, 67 yards, TOP 00:53
- USU – Connor Coles 45-yard field goal, 0:01. Aggies 24–14. Drive: 6 plays, 19 yards, TOP 00:51

Fourth quarter

- CONN – Noe Ruelas 47-yard field goal, 13:28. Aggies 24–17. Drive: 9 plays, 46 yards, TOP 04:37
- CONN – Noe Ruelas 54-yard field goal, 10:09. Aggies 24–20. Drive: 6 plays, 16 yards, TOP 01:51
- USU – Brian Cobbs 11-yard pass from Logan Bonner (Connor Coles kick), 6:00. Aggies 31–20. Drive: 13 plays, 75 yards, TOP 04:09

Top passers

- CONN – Zion Turner – 12/31, 109 yards, 1 TD
- USU – Logan Bonner – 20/29, 281 yards, 3 TD

Top rushers

- CONN – Nate Carter – 20 rushes, 190 yards
- USU – Calvin Tyler Jr. – 33 rushes, 161 yards

Top receivers

- CONN – Aaron Turner – 3 receptions, 32 yards
- USU – Brian Cobbs – 7 receptions, 78 yards, 1 TD

Top defense

- CONN – Jackson Mitchell – 16 tackles
- USU – MJ Tafisi – 10 tackles

Statistics	UConn	USU
First downs	21	31
Total yards	364	542
Rushing yards	245	261
Passing yards	119	281
Turnovers	3	2
Time of possession	28:17	31:43

=== At No. 1 Alabama Crimson Tide ===
Team	1	2	3	4	Total
Utah State	0	0	0	0	0
• No. 1 Alabama	17	24	14	0	55

- Date: September 3
- Location: Tuscaloosa, AL
- Game start: 6:39 p.m.
- Game attendance: 98,321
- Game weather: 83, Sunny, Wind S @ 7 mph
- Referee: Lee Hedrick
- TV announcers (SEC Network): Tom Hart (play-by-play), Jordan Rodgers (color), Cole Cubelic (sideline)

Statistics	Utah State	Alabama
First downs	7	30
Total yards	136	559
Rushing yards	79	278
Passing yards	57	281
Turnovers	0	1
Time of possession	28:09	31:51

Team	Category	Player	Statistics
Utah State	Passing	Logan Bonner	3/9, 39 yards
Utah State	Rushing	Robert Briggs	10 carries, 28 yards
Utah State	Receiving	Brian Cobbs	2 receptions, 33 yards
Alabama	Passing	Bryce Young	18/28, 195 yards, 5 TD's
Alabama	Rushing	Bryce Young	5 carries, 100 yards, 1 TD
Alabama	Receiving	Traeshon Holden	5 receptions, 70 yards, 2 TD's

Scoring summary

Quarter	Time	Drive			Team	Scoring information	Score	
Quarter	Time	Plays	Yards	TOP	Team	Scoring information	USU	ALA
1st	9:56	7	44	2:52	ALA	45-yard field goal by Will Reichard (#16)	0	3
1st	5:56	7	60	3:02	ALA	Jermaine Burton (#3) 5-yard touchdown reception from Bryce Young (#9), Will Reichard (#16) kick good	0	10
1st	3:06	3	34	1:31	ALA	Traeshon Holden (#11) 9-yard touchdown reception from Bryce Young (#9), Will Reichard (#16) kick good	0	17
2nd	12:19	11	82	4:27	ALA	Jermaine Burton (#3) 2-yard touchdown reception from Bryce Young (#9), Will Reichard (#16) kick good	0	24
2nd	10:14	4	77	0:55	ALA	Traeshon Holden (#11) 14-yard touchdown reception from Bryce Young (#9), Will Reichard (#16) kick good	0	31
2nd	2:56	11	51	4:44	ALA	33-yard field goal by Will Reichard (#16)	0	34
2nd	0:15	5	62	0:50	ALA	Jase McClellan (#2) 8-yard touchdown reception from Bryce Young (#9), Will Reichard (#16) kick good	0	41
3rd	13:37	3	65	1:23	ALA	Bryce Young (#9) 4-yard touchdown run, Will Reichard (#16) kick good	0	48
3rd	10:18	4	44	1:54	ALA	Jase McClellan (#2) 17-yard touchdown reception from Jalen Milroe (#4), Will Reichard (#16) kick good	0	55
"TOP" = time of possession. For other American football terms, see Glossary of American football.							USU 0	ALA 55
