= 2022 UNLV Rebels football team =

American college football season

2022 UNLV Rebels football
- Conference: Mountain West Conference
- West Division
- Record: 5–7 (3–5 MW)
- Head coach: Marcus Arroyo (3rd season)
- Offensive coordinator: Nick Holz (1st season)
- Offensive scheme: Pro-style
- Defensive coordinator: Keith Heyward (1st season)
- Base defense: 4–2–5
- Home stadium: Allegiant Stadium

2022 Mountain West Conference football standings
	Conf.			Overall
Team	W		L	W		L
Mountain Division
Boise State xy	8	–	0	10	–	4
Air Force	5	–	3	10	–	3
Wyoming	5	–	3	7	–	6
Utah State	5	–	3	6	–	7
Colorado State	3	–	5	3	–	9
New Mexico	0	–	8	2	–	10
West Division
No. 24 Fresno State xy$	7	–	1	10	–	4
San Diego State	5	–	3	7	–	6
San Jose State	5	–	3	7	–	5
UNLV	3	–	5	5	–	7
Hawaii	2	–	6	3	–	10
Nevada	0	–	8	2	–	10
Championship: Fresno State 28, Boise State 16
$ – Conference champion; x – Division champion/co-champions; y – Championship game participant; Rankings from AP Poll

The 2022 UNLV Rebels football team represented the University of Nevada, Las Vegas (UNLV) as a member of the Mountain West Conference (MW) during the 2022 NCAA Division I FBS football season. Led by Marcus Arroyo in his third and final season as head coach, the Rebels compiled an overall record of 5–7 record with a mark of 3–5 in conference play, placing fourth in the MW's West Division. The team played home games at the Allegiant Stadium in Paradise, Nevada.

On November 28, two days after the final game of the season, Arroyo was fired. He finished his tenure at UNLV with an overall record of 7–23. In December, Barry Odom was hired as UNLV's new head football coach.

== Schedule ==
UNLV and the Mountain West Conference announced the 2022 football schedule on February 16, 2022.

Date	Time	Opponent	Site	TV	Result	Attendance
August 27	12:30 p.m.	Idaho State*	Allegiant Stadium; Paradise, NV	CBSSN	W 52–21	19,579
September 10	1:00 p.m.	at California*	California Memorial Stadium; Berkeley, CA	P12N	L 14–20	38,180
September 17	12:00 p.m.	North Texas*	Allegiant Stadium; Paradise, NV	KVVU	W 58–27	19,623
September 24	4:00 p.m.	at Utah State	Maverik Stadium; Logan, UT	CBSSN	W 34–24	17,454
September 30	8:00 p.m.	New Mexico	Allegiant Stadium; Paradise, NV	CBSSN	W 31–20	21,605
October 7	7:30 p.m.	at San Jose State	CEFCU Stadium; San Jose, CA	CBSSN	L 7–40	16,669
October 15	7:30 p.m.	Air Force	Allegiant Stadium; Paradise, NV	CBSSN	L 7–42	23,847
October 22	11:30 a.m.	at Notre Dame*	Notre Dame Stadium; South Bend, IN	Peacock	L 21–44	73,165
November 5	4:00 p.m.	at San Diego State	Snapdragon Stadium; San Diego, CA	CBSSN	L 10–14	28,854
November 11	7:30 p.m.	Fresno State	Allegiant Stadium; Paradise, NV	CBSSN	L 30–37	23,146
November 19	8:00 p.m.	at Hawaii	Clarence T. C. Ching Athletics Complex; Honolulu, HI	SPEC PPV, KVVU	L 25–31	9,346
November 26	3:00 p.m.	Nevada	Allegiant Stadium; Paradise, NV (Fremont Cannon)	KNSN-TV, KVVU	W 27–22	24,873
*Non-conference game; All times are in Pacific time

== Game summaries ==
=== Idaho State ===
Idaho State Bengals (0-0) at UNLV Rebels (0-0) – Game summary

Quarter	1	2	3	4	Total
Bengals	7	0	7	7	21
Rebels	10	35	0	7	52

at Allegiant Stadium, Las Vegas, Nevada

- Date: August 27
- Game time: 12:30 p.m. MDT
- Game weather: None (indoor stadium)
- Game attendance: 19,579
- Referee: Kevin Boitmann
- TV announcers (CBSSN): Chris Lewis (play by play), Donte Whitner (analyst)
- Spread: UNLV -22.5 • Odds to win: UNLV 99.9% •

Game information

First quarter

- (9:13) UNLV - Aidan Robbins 1 yard run, Daniel Gutierrez kick
- (3:52) UNLV - Daniel Gutierrez 39 yard field goal
- (0:15) ISU - Jalen Johnson 55 yard pass from Tyler Vander Waal, Ian Hershey kick

Second quarter

- (13:02) UNLV - Aidan Robbins 2 yard run, Daniel Gutierrez kick
- (9:29) UNLV - Ricky White 72 yard pass from Doug Brumfield, Daniel Gutierrez kick
- (6:49) UNLV - Kyle Williams 9 yard pass from Doug Brumfield, Daniel Gutierrez kick
- (3:23) UNLV - Ricky White 19 yard pass from Doug Brumfield, Daniel Gutierrez kick
- (0:42) UNLV - Aidan Robbins 7 yard pass from Doug Brumfield, Daniel Gutierrez kick

Third quarter

- (3:04) ISU - Hunter Hays 5 yard run, Ian Hershey kick

Fourth quarter

- (10:54) ISU - Xavier Guillory 19 yard pass from Hunter Hays, Ian Hershey kick
- (5:05) UNLV - Zyell Griffin 14 yard pass from Cameron Friel, Daniel Gutierrez kick

Statistics	ISU	UNLV
First downs	13	23
Plays–yards	67-241	59-554
Rushes–yards	40-50	33-149
Passing yards	191	405
Passing: comp–att–int	14-27-1	26-35-0
Time of possession	29:36	30:24

Team	Category	Player	Statistics
Idaho State	Passing	Tyler Vander Waal	7/13, 130 yards, 1 TD, 1 INT
Idaho State	Rushing	Raiden Hunter	13 carries, 26 yards
Idaho State	Receiving	Xavier Guillory	4 receptions, 73 yards, 1 TD
UNLV	Passing	Doug Brumfield	21/25, 356 yards, 4 TD
UNLV	Rushing	Courtney Reese	7 carries, 73 yards
UNLV	Receiving	Ricky White	8 receptions, 182 yards, 2 TD

=== At California ===
UNLV Rebels (1–0) vs California Golden Bears (1–0) – Game summary

Quarter	1	2	3	4	Total
Rebels	0	7	7	0	14
Golden Bears	14	3	3	0	20

at California Memorial Stadium • Berkeley, CA

- Date: September 10, 2022
- Game time: 1:07 p.m.
- Game weather: Sloudy, 68 °F (20 °C)
- Game attendance: 38,180
- Referee: Francisco Villar
- TV announcers (Pac-12 Network): Guy Haberman (play-by-play), Shane Vereen (analyst)

Game information

First Quarter

- (11:08) CAL – Jaydn Ott 2-yard run, Dario Longhetto kick (Drive: 6 plays, 55 yards, 3:02; California 7–0)
- (3:52) CAL – Jaydn Ott 12-yard pass from Jack Plummer, Dario Longhetto kick (Drive: 10 plays, 80 yards, 5:58; California 14–0)

Second Quarter

- (14:55) UNLV – Kyle Williams 11-yard pass from Doug Brumfield, Daniel Gutierrez kick (Drive: 9 plays, 75 yards, 3:57; California 14–7)
- (1:58) CAL – Dario Longhetto 21-yard field goal (Drive: 8 plays, 65 yards, 4:22; California 17–7)

Third Quarter

- (8:21) CAL – Dario Longhetto 30-yard field goal (Drive: 14 plays, 67 yards, 6:34; California 20–7)
- (7:04) UNLV – Aidan Robbins 31-yard run, Daniel Gutierrez kick (Drive: 4 plays, 75 yards, 1:17; California 20–14)

Fourth Quarter

None

Statistics	UNLV	CAL
First downs	17	25
Total yards	309	370
Rushes/yards	31–103	32–92
Passing yards	206	278
Passing: Comp–Att–Int	18–33–1	28–39–1
Time of possession	24:24	35:36

Team	Category	Player	Statistics
UNLV	Passing	Doug Brumfield	18/33, 206 yards, TD, INT
UNLV	Rushing	Aidan Robbins	14 carries, 84 yards, TD
UNLV	Receiving	Ricky White	4 receptions, 59 yards
California	Passing	Jack Plummer	28/39, 278 yards, TD, INT
California	Rushing	Jaydn Ott	7 carries, 52 yards, TD
California	Receiving	Jeremiah Hunter	5 receptions, 79 yards

=== North Texas ===
	1	2	3	4	Total
Mean Green	10	10	7	0	27
Rebels	9	14	14	21	58

Statistics	UNT	UNLV
First downs	20	28
Total yards	474	576
Rushing yards	169	365
Passing yards	305	211
Turnovers	2	0
Time of possession	21:03	38:57

Team	Category	Player	Statistics
North Texas	Passing	Austin Aune	17/29, 305 yards, 2 TD, 2 INT
North Texas	Rushing	Ayo Adeyi	11 carries, 73 yards
North Texas	Receiving	Roderic Burns	5 receptions, 98 yards
UNLV	Passing	Doug Brumfield	21/27, 211 yards, 2 TD
UNLV	Rushing	Aidan Robbins	29 carries, 227 yards, 3 TD
UNLV	Receiving	Ricky White	7 receptions, 76 yards, TD

=== At Notre Dame ===
UNLV Rebels (4–3) vs Notre Dame Fighting Irish (3–3) – Game summary

Quarter	1	2	3	4	Total
Rebels	7	0	7	7	21
Fighting Irish	23	7	0	14	44

at Notre Dame Stadium • South Bend, IN

- Date: October 22, 2022
- Game time: 11:30 a.m. PT
- Game weather: Sunny, 72 °F (22 °C)
- Game attendance: 73,165
- Referee: Jerry Magallanes
- TV announcers (Peacock): Jac Collinsworth (play–by–play), Jason Garrett (analyst), Zora Stephenson (sideline)

Game information

First Quarter

- (12:35) ND – Audric Estimé 12-yard run, Blake Grupe kick (Drive: 6 plays, 75 yards, 2:25; Notre Dame 7–0)
- (10:06) ND – Blake Grupe 43-yard field goal (Drive: 5 plays, 18 yards, 2:07; Notre Dame 10–0)
- (9:10) UNLV – Jordan Younge-Humphrey 2-yard run, Daniel Gutierrez kick (Drive: 3 plays, 75 yards, 0:56; Notre Dame 10–7)
- (6:24) ND – Michael Mayer 20-yard pass from Drew Pyne, Blake Grupe kick (Drive: 2 plays, 20 yards, 0:08; Notre Dame 17–7)
- (3:58) ND – Blake Grupe 27-yard field goal (Drive: 4 plays, 5 yards, 0:48; Notre Dame 20–7)
- (1:18) ND – Blake Grupe 46-yard field goal (Drive: 4 plays, 4 yards, 1:12; Notre Dame 23–7)

Second Quarter

- (4:10) ND – Mitchell Evans 1-yard run, Blake Grupe kick (Drive: 6 plays, 46 yards, 3:04; Notre Dame 30–7)

Third Quarter

- (8:06) UNLV – Harrison Bailey 2-yard run, Daniel Gutierrez kick (Drive: 9 plays, 76 yards, 3:43; Notre Dame 30–14)

Fourth Quarter

- (11:59) ND – Chris Tyree 8-yard run, Blake Grupe kick (Drive: 13 plays, 62 yards, 7:10; Notre Dame 37–14)
- (8:02) UNLV – Jordan Younge-Humphrey 1-yard run, Daniel Gutierrez kick (Drive: 11 plays, 75 yards, 3:57; Notre Dame 37–21)
- (2:55) ND – Braden Lenzy 4-yard pass from Drew Pyne, Blake Grupe kick (Drive: 9 plays, 46 yards, 5:06; Notre Dame 44–21)

Statistics	UNLV	ND
First downs	11	23
Total yards	299	428
Rushes/yards	28–146	47–223
Passing yards	153	205
Passing: Comp–Att–Int	17–33–0	14–28–1
Time of possession	26:02	33:58

Team	Category	Player	Statistics
UNLV	Passing	Cameron Friel	8/15, 80 yards
UNLV	Rushing	Courtney Reese	11 carries, 142 yards
UNLV	Receiving	Nick Williams	4 receptions, 47 yards
Notre Dame	Passing	Drew Pyne	14/28, 205 yards, 2 TD, INT
Notre Dame	Rushing	Logan Diggs	28 carries, 130 yards
Notre Dame	Receiving	Michael Mayer	6 receptions, 115 yards, TD

=== Fresno State ===
Game Ten – Fresno State Bulldogs (5–4) at UNLV Rebels (4–5)

Quarter	1	2	3	4	Total
Bulldogs	7	7	10	13	37
Rebels	10	6	3	11	30

at Allegiant Stadium • Paradise, NV

- Date: Friday, November 11, 2022
- Game time: 7:30 p.m. PST
- Game weather: Partly Cloudy • Temperature: 61 °F (16 °C) • Wind:
- Game attendance: 23,146
- Referee: Kevin Boitmann
- TV announcers (CBSSN): Carter Blackburn (play-by-play), & Tom Herman (analyst)

Game information

First quarter

- (11:29) UNLV – Daniel Gutierrez 42-yard field goal (Drive: 10 plays, 51 yards, 3:31; UNLV 3–0)
- (8:29) FRES – Jalen Cropper 33-yard pass from Jake Haener, Dylan Lynch kick (Drive: 7 plays, 48 yards, 3:00; Fresno State 7–3)
- (1:12) UNLV – Doug Brumfield 5-yard run, Daniel Gutierrez kick (Drive: 15 plays, 75 yards, 7:17; UNLV 10–7)

Second quarter

- (9:39) UNLV – Daniel Gutierrez 48-yard field goal (Drive: 7 plays, 15 yards, 3:54; UNLV 13–7)
- (6:16) FRES – Jordan Mims 5-yard run, Dylan Lynch kick (Drive: 9 plays, 74 yards, 3:17; Fresno State 14–13)
- (0:17) UNLV – Daniel Gutierrez 27-yard field goal (Drive: 14 plays, 66 yards, 5:59; UNLV 16–14)

Third quarter

- (9:49) FRES – Dylan Lynch 26-yard field goal (Drive: 12 plays, 67 yards, 5:11; Fresno State 17–16)
- (3:15) FRES – Zane Pope 2-yard pass from Jake Haener, Dylan Lynch kick (Drive: 10 plays, 46 yards, 4:50; Fresno State 24–16)
- (0:48) UNLV – Daniel Gutierrez 38-yard field goal (Drive: 7 plays, 55 yards, 2:27; Fresno State 24–19)

Fourth quarter

- (10:57) FRES – Dylan Lynch 23-yard field goal (Drive: 10 plays, 52 yards, 4:43; Fresno State 27–19)
- (9:28) UNLV – Adin Robbins 66-yard run, Nick Williams–Kyle Williams Two-point pass (Drive: 5 plays, 75 yards, 1:29; Tied 27–27)
- (8:47) FRES – Jalen Cropper 60-yard pass from Jake Haener, Dylan Lynch kick (Drive: 3 plays, 79 yards, 0:37; Fresno State 34–27)
- (2:56) FRES – Dylan Lynch 29-yard field goal (Drive: 7 plays, 22 yards, 4:11; Fresno State 37–27)
- (0:13) UNLV – Daniel Gutierrez 33-yard field goal (Drive: 14 plays, 59 yards, 2:43; Fresno State 37–30)

Statistics	FRES	UNLV
First downs	21	22
Plays–yards	60–381	71–391
Rushes–yards	26–68	39–219
Passing yards	313	172
Passing: comp–att–int	28–36–0	18–34–0
Time of possession	29:16	30:44

Team	Category	Player	Statistics
Fresno State	Passing	Jake Haener	28/36, 313 yards, 3 TD
Fresno State	Rushing	Jordan Mims	21 carries, 70 yards, TD
Fresno State	Receiving	Jalen Cropper	8 receptions, 164 yards, 2 TD
UNLV	Passing	Doug Brumfield	18/34, 172 yards
UNLV	Rushing	Aidan Robbins	26 carries, 144 yards, TD
UNLV	Receiving	Kyle Williams	6 receptions, 43 yards

=== At Hawaii ===
UNLV Rebels at Hawaii Rainbow Warriors

Quarter	1	2	3	4	Total
Rebels	6	7	3	9	25
Rainbow Warriors	7	0	14	10	31

at Clarence T. C. Ching Athletics Complex, Honolulu, HI

- Date: November 19, 2022
- Game time: 6:00 p.m. HT
- Game attendance: 9,346
- TV announcers (Spectrum PPV): Kanoa Leahey (play-by-play), Rich Miano (analyst), Scott Robbs (sideline)
