= Kane Ioane =

American football player and coach (born 1982)

Current position
- Title: Defensive coordinator
- Team: Nevada
- Conference: MW
- Annual salary: $200,000

Biographical details
- Born: January 23, 1982 (age 44); Billings, Montana, U.S.
- Education: Montana State University (2005)

Playing career
- 2000–2004: Montana State
- Position: Safety

Coaching career (HC unless noted)
- 2005–2014: Montana State (LB)
- 2015: Montana State (DC/LB)
- 2016: Montana State (LB)
- 2017–2018: Washington (Def. analyst)
- 2019–2020: Montana State (DC/S)
- 2021–2023: Boise State (co-DC/S)
- 2024–present: Nevada (DC)

Kane Ioane (/ˈaɪ.oʊn/ EYE-own; born January 23, 1982) is an American college football coach and former player. He previously served as the co-defensive coordinator and safeties coach for the Boise State Broncos. He currently serves as the defensive coordinator for the Nevada Wolf Pack.

== Playing career ==
Ioane played safety for Montana State, earning All-America honors for four straight years, from 2000 to 2003. He was the Big Sky Conference defensive MVP in 2003 and finished at Montana State as the Big Sky's all-time tackles leader. Ioane was inducted to the Montana State Hall of Fame in 2014, and the Montana Football Hall of Fame in 2016.

Ioane spent a brief stint with the Tampa Bay Buccaneers following his graduation, during the offseason following the 2004 season. He participated in mini-camp, but ultimately did not make the roster and returned to Bozeman for a coaching position in 2005.

== Coaching career ==
After serving as a student assistant during the 2004 season, Ioane was hired by Montana State as a linebackers coach to begin the 2005 season. He remained in this position until 2016, with only one year gap in 2015, during which time he was also Montana State's defensive coordinator. In 2017, Ioane accepted a position at Washington as a defensive analyst, a position he held for two years. In 2019, Ioane returned to Montana State as the Bobcats' defensive coordinator and safeties coach; he held this position for two years as well. In 2021, he accepted a position at Boise State as the co-defensive coordinator and safeties coach on the staff of new head coach Andy Avalos. On December 18, 2023 he was announced as the new Defensive Coordinator on the staff of new head coach Jeff Choate.

== Personal life ==
Ioane is a native of Billings, Montana, and graduated from Montana State University with a Bachelor of Arts in education in 2005. He lives with his wife, Kerri, and their two children.
