= 2022 Boise State Broncos football team =

American college football season

2022 Boise State Broncos football

MW Mountain Division champion Frisco Bowl champion

MW Championship Game, L 16–28 vs. Fresno State

Frisco Bowl, W 35–32 vs. North Texas
- Conference: Mountain West Conference
- Mountain Division
- Record: 10–4 (8–0 MW)
- Head coach: Andy Avalos (2nd season)
- Offensive coordinator: Tim Plough (2nd season; first four games); Dirk Koetter (interim; remainder of season)
- Offensive scheme: Up-tempo spread
- Defensive coordinator: Spencer Danielson (2nd season)
- Co-defensive coordinator: Kane Ioane (2nd season)
- Base defense: 4–2–5
- Home stadium: Albertsons Stadium

Uniform
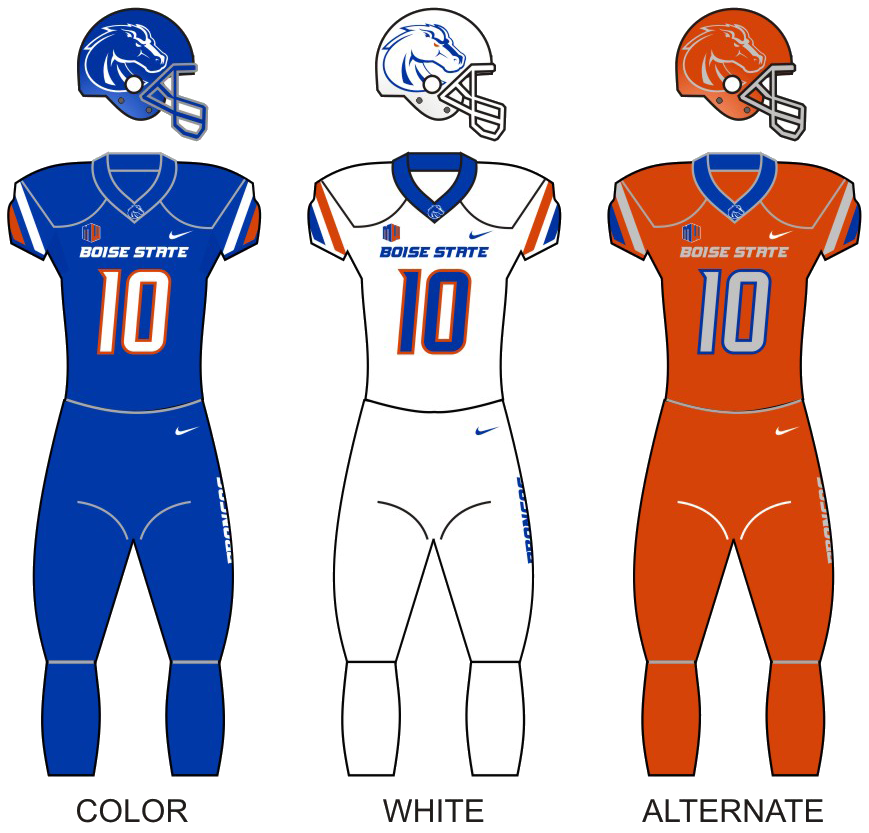

2022 Mountain West Conference football standings
	Conf.			Overall
Team	W		L	W		L
Mountain Division
Boise State xy	8	–	0	10	–	4
Air Force	5	–	3	10	–	3
Wyoming	5	–	3	7	–	6
Utah State	5	–	3	6	–	7
Colorado State	3	–	5	3	–	9
New Mexico	0	–	8	2	–	10
West Division
No. 24 Fresno State xy$	7	–	1	10	–	4
San Diego State	5	–	3	7	–	6
San Jose State	5	–	3	7	–	5
UNLV	3	–	5	5	–	7
Hawaii	2	–	6	3	–	10
Nevada	0	–	8	2	–	10
Championship: Fresno State 28, Boise State 16
$ – Conference champion; x – Division champion/co-champions; y – Championship game participant; Rankings from AP Poll

The 2022 Boise State Broncos football team represented Boise State University as a member of the Mountain West Conference during the 2022 NCAA Division I FBS football season. They were led by head coach Andy Avalos, who was coaching his second season with the team. The Broncos played their home games at Albertsons Stadium in Boise, Idaho.

The Broncos completed their regular season with a 9–3, 8–0 in Mountain West play to be champions of the Mountain Division. They represented the Mountain Division in the Mountain West Championship Game where they were defeated by the Fresno State Bulldogs. They were invited to the Frisco Bowl where they beat the North Texas Mean Green.

== Schedule ==
Boise State and the Mountain West Conference announced the 2022 football schedule on February 16, 2022.

Date	Time	Opponent	Site	TV	Result	Attendance
September 3	8:30 p.m.	at Oregon State*	Reser Stadium; Corvallis, OR	ESPN	L 17–34	27,732
September 9	7:00 p.m.	at New Mexico	University Stadium; Albuquerque, NM	CBSSN	W 31–14	16,127
September 17	2:00 p.m.	No. 16 (FCS) UT Martin*	Albertsons Stadium; Boise, ID	FS1	W 30–7	36,396
September 23	7:00 p.m.	at UTEP*	Sun Bowl; El Paso, TX	CBSSN	L 10–27	11,227
September 30	6:00 p.m.	San Diego State	Albertsons Stadium; Boise, ID	FS1	W 35–13	34,910
October 8	7:45 p.m.	Fresno State	Albertsons Stadium; Boise, ID (rivalry)	FS1	W 40–20	37,663
October 22	5:00 p.m.	at Air Force	Falcon Stadium; Colorado Springs, CO	CBSSN	W 19–14	25,254
October 29	5:00 p.m.	Colorado State	Albertsons Stadium; Boise, ID	FS1	W 49–10	33,895
November 5	5:00 p.m.	BYU*	Albertsons Stadium; Boise, ID	FS2	L 28–31	36,461
November 12	8:30 p.m.	at Nevada	Mackay Stadium; Reno, NV (rivalry)	CBSSN	W 41–3	14,960
November 19	5:00 p.m.	at Wyoming	War Memorial Stadium; Laramie, WY	CBSSN	W 20–17	17,345
November 25	10:00 a.m.	Utah State	Albertsons Stadium; Boise, ID	CBS	W 42–23	31,402
December 3	2:00 p.m.	Fresno State	Albertsons Stadium; Boise, ID (MW Championship Game)	FOX	L 16–28	24,037
December 17	7:15 p.m.	vs. North Texas*	Toyota Stadium; Frisco, TX (Frisco Bowl)	ESPN	W 35–32	12,211
*Non-conference game; Rankings from AP Poll (and CFP Rankings, after November 1) - Released prior to game; All times are in Mountain time

== Rankings ==
Ranking movements Legend: ██ Increase in ranking ██ Decrease in ranking — = Not ranked RV = Received votes
	Week															
Poll	Pre	1	2	3	4	5	6	7	8	9	10	11	12	13	14	Final
AP	RV	—	—	—	—	—	—	—	—	RV	—	RV	RV	RV	RV	RV
Coaches	RV	—	—	—	—	—	—	—	RV	RV	RV	RV	RV	RV	RV	RV
CFP	Not released									—	—	—	—	—	—	Not released

== Roster ==
2022 Boise State Broncos football team roster
Players
Coaches
Offense

Pos.	#	Name	Class
RB	2	Ashton Jeanty	Fr
TE	3	Riley Smith	Sr
QB	4	Sam Vidlak	Fr
WR	5	Stefan Cobbs	Sr
WR	7	Latrell Caples	So
WR	9	Shea Whiting	Jr
QB	10	Taylen Green	Fr
QB	14	Maddux Madsen	Fr
QB	15	Colt Fulton	Fr
WR	17	Davis Koetter	GS
WR	18	Billy Bowens	Sr
QB	19	Hank Bachmeier	Sr
RB	24	George Holani	Jr
RB	25	Kaden Dudley	Fr
RB	26	Taylor Marcum	Fr
WR	29	Ben Ford	Fr
RB	32	Ethan Mikita	Fr
RB	33	Tyler Crowe	Jr
RB	36	Elelyon Noa	Jr
TE	40	Russell Corrigan	So
WR	46	Hunter Steacker	Fr
TE	49	Jack Beresford	Fr
OL	55	Kekaniokoa Holomalia-Gonzalez	Sr
OL	57	Nathan Cardona	So
OL	61	Tyson Molio'o	Fr
OL	62	Roger Carreon	Fr
OL	63	Mason Randolph	Fr
OL	65	Hall Schmidt	Fr
OL	66	Ben Dooley	Jr
OL	69	Garrett Curran	Sr
OL	70	John Ojukwu	GS
OL	71	Cade Beresford	Sr
OL	72	Dallas Holliday	Sr
OL	73	Joseph Amos	Fr
OL	75	Will Farrar	GS
OL	76	Rick Moore	So
OL	77	Kage Casey	Fr
OL	78	Julian Simpson	Jr
OL	79	Cord Kringlen	Fr
WR	80	Eric McAlister	Fr
WR	81	Austin Bolt	So
WR	83	Cole Wright	So
WR	84	Zamondre Merriweather	Fr
TE	85	Matt Lauter	Fr
TE	86	Austin Terry	Fr
TE	87	Kurt Rafdal	GS
TE	88	Tyneil Hopper	Sr
WR	89	Connor Riddle	Sr
TE	96	Luke Voorhees	Fr

Defense

Pos.	#	Name	Class
S	0	JL Skinner	Sr
CB	1	Caleb Biggers	GS
OLB	3	Brandon Hawkins	Sr
S	4	Rodney Robinson	So
MLB	7	Ezekiel Noa	GS
CB	8	Markel Reed	Sr
OLB	10	Andrew Simpson	Fr
CB	14	Kaonohi Kaniho	So
DE	15	Deven Wright	Jr
S	16	Jared Reed	GS
S	19	Keenan McCaddy	Fr
CB	21	Tyreque Jones	GS
CB	22	Tyric LeBeauf	Sr
S	23	Seyi Oladipo	So
S	25	Isaiah Bradford	Fr
CB	27	Dionte Thornton	Fr
S	28	Seth Knothe	Fr
DE	30	Isaiah Bagnah	Jr
S	31	Zion Washington	Fr
S	32	Bryce Cleave	Fr
DL	33	Cortez Hogans	Sr
S	34	Alexander Teubner	Jr
LB	35	Gavin Hambrick	Fr
CB	36	Justus Del Rio	Fr
CB	37	Chip Mitchell	Sr
DE	38	Demitri Washington	Sr
CB	39	Jalen Neal	Fr
DE	40	Jayden Virgin	Fr
CB	41	Jaylen Clark	So
LB	43	Jake Ripp	Fr
DE	44	George Tarlas	GS
DE	45	James Wilborn Jr.	Fr
LB	50	Dishawn Misa	Fr
OLB	52	D. J. Schramm	Sr
OLB	53	Marco Notarainni	Fr
DE	54	Gabe Hunter	So
DE	56	Mason Jacobsen	Fr
MLB	58	Ty Tanner	Fr
MLB	59	Rejhan Tatum	Fr
DL	90	Braxton Fely	Fr
DT	91	Ahmed Hassanein	So
DT	92	Michael Callahan	Jr
DE	93	Andy Nwaoko	So
DT	94	Jackson Cravens	Sr
DT	95	Divine Obichere	GS
DL	97	J. J. Talo	Fr
DT	98	Herbert Gums	So
DT	99	Scott Matlock	Sr

Special teams

Pos.	#	Name	Class
K/P	35	Jonah Dalmas	Jr
K	39	Wyatt Redding	Fr
LS	42	Mason Hutton	Fr
P	43	Gavin Wale	Jr
K/P	45	Will Ferrin	Fr
P	46	James Ferguson-Reynolds	Fr

Head coach

- Andy Avalos

Coordinators/assistant coaches

- Tim Plough – Offensive coordinator/Quarterbacks
- Kane Ioane – Co-defensive coordinator/Safeties
- Spencer Danielson – Co-defensive coordinator/Inside linebackers
- Keith Bhonapha – Special teams coordinator/Running backs
- Matt Miller – Wide receivers
- Nate Potter – Run game coordinator/Tight ends
- Frank Maile – Defensive linemen
- Demario Warren – Cornerbacks
- Kelly Poppinga – Co-special teams coordinator/Edge rushers
- Tim Keane – Offensive linemen
- Reid Kagy – Director, Strength and Conditioning
- Will Heffner – Offensive analyst
- Dirk Koetter – Offensive analyst
- Ron Collins – Defensive analyst
- Jabril Frazier – Defensive analyst
- Michael Frisina – Special teams analyst
- Vincent Johnson III – Graduate assistant
- Keith Price – Graduate assistant
- Keanu Yamamoto – Graduate assistant

Legend

- (C) Team captain
- (S) Suspended
- (I) Ineligible
- Injured
- Redshirt

Roster
Last update: 8/12/23

== Game summaries ==
=== At Oregon State ===
Boise State Broncos at Oregon State Beavers

Quarter	1	2	3	4	Total
Broncos	0	0	10	7	17
Beavers	14	10	3	7	34

at Reser Stadium, Corvallis, Oregon

- Date: September 3rd, 2022
- Game time: 8:30 p.m. MDT
- Game weather: Wind: NW 8 mph (13 km/h) • Weather: Sunny • Temperature: 77 °F (25 °C)
- Game attendance: 27,732
- Referee: Scott Campbell
- TV announcers (ESPN): Sean McDonough (play-by-play), Todd Blackledge (analyst), Molly McGrath (sideline)
- Recap, Postgame Notes, Gamebook

Game information

1st quarter

- 5:24 - OSU - Luke Musgrave 27 yd pass from Chance Nolan (Everett Hayes kick), 2 plays, 53 yards, TOP 00:54 • Beavers 7-0
- 1:15 - OSU - Tyjon Lindsey 47 yd pass from Chance Nolan (Everett Hayes kick), 4 plays, 60 yards, TOP 02:01 • Beavers 14-0

2nd quarter

- 10:28 - OSU - Everett Hayes 20 yd field goal, 4 plays, 3 yards, TOP 01:35 • Beavers 17-0
- 3:11 - OSU - Deshaun Fenwick 12 yd run (Everett Hayes kick), 4 plays, 98 yards, TOP 01:33 • Beavers 24-0

3rd quarter

- 12:11 - BSU - Jonah Dalmas 41 yd field goal, 4 plays, 2 yards, TOP 01:24 • Beavers 24-3
- 2:57 - OSU - Everett Hayes 23 yd field goal, 7 plays, 55 yards, TOP 04:26 • Beavers 27-3
- 2:10 - BSU - Taylen Green 74 yd run (Jonah Dalmas kick), 2 plays, 75 yards, TOP 00:47 • Beavers 27-10

4th quarter

- 13:05 - BSU - Taylen Green 4 yd run (Jonah Dalmas kick), 6 plays, 67 yards, TOP 01:59 • Beavers 27-17
- 10:39 - OSU - Jack Colletto 41 yd run (Everett Hayes kick), 5 plays, 65 yards, TOP 02:26 • Beavers 34–17

BSU Passing Leaders

- Taylen Green - 19/28, 155 yards, 1 INT

BSU Rushing Leaders

- Taylen Green - 11 rushes, 102 yards, 2 TD

BSU Receiving Leaders

- Ashton Jeanty - 6 receptions, 52 yards

BSU Defense Leaders

- JL Skinner – 12 tackles, 1 INT

=== At New Mexico ===
Boise State Broncos at New Mexico Lobos

Quarter	1	2	3	4	Total
Broncos	0	10	7	14	31
Lobos	0	0	0	14	14

at University Stadium, Albuquerque, NM

- Date: September 9th
- Game time: 7:00 p.m. MST
- Game weather: Wind: SE 8 mph (13 km/h) • Weather: Cloudy • Temperature: 83 °F (28 °C)
- Game attendance: 16,127
- Referee: Tim Davis
- TV: CBSSN
- Recap, Postgame Notes, Gamebook

Game information

First quarter

- No scoring

Second quarter

- 14:53 - BSU - Latrell Caples 18 yd pass from Hank Bachmeier (Jonah Dalmas kick), 8 plays, 91 yards, TOP 03:20 • Broncos 7-0
- 6:57 - BSU - Jonah Dalmas 48 yd field goal, 6 plays, 35 yards, TOP 02:27 • Broncos 10-0

Third quarter

- 9:49 - BSU - Deven Wright 0 yd punt return (Jonah Dalmas kick) • Broncos 17-0

Fourth quarter

- 14:53 - BSU - George Holani 3 yd pass from Hank Bachmeier (Jonah Dalmas kick), 8 plays, 86 yards, TOP 04:07 • Broncos 24-0
- 14:35 - UNM - Geordon Porter 69 yd pass from Miles Kendrick (Luke Drzewiecki kick), 1 play, 69 yards, TOP 00:11 • Broncos 24-7
- 6:21 - BSU - Latrell Caples 4 yd pass from Hank Bachmeier (Jonah Dalmas kick), 7 plays, 31 yards, TOP 03:55 • Broncos 31-7
- 6:07 - UNM - Christian Washington 100 yd kickoff return (Luke Drzewiecki kick) • Broncos 31-14

BSU Passing Leaders

- Hank Bachmeier – 16/27, 170 yards, 3 TD, 1 INT

BSU Rushing Leaders

- Ashton Jeanty – 12 rushes, 72 yards

BSU Receiving Leaders

- Billy Bowens – 3 receptions, 50 yards

BSU Defense Leaders

- Ezekiel Noa – 4 tackles

=== No. 16 (FCS) UT Martin ===
No. 16 (FCS) UT Martin Skyhawks at Boise State Broncos

Quarter	1	2	3	4	Total
Skyhawks	7	0	0	0	7
Broncos	7	13	0	10	30

at Albertsons Stadium, Boise, ID

- Date: September 17th
- Game time: 2:00 p.m. MST
- Game weather: Wind: SE 8 mph (13 km/h) • Weather: Sunny • Temperature: 71 °F (22 °C)
- Game attendance: 36,396
- Referee: Jon Noli
- TV: FS1
- Recap, Postgame Notes, Gamebook

Game information

First quarter

- 9:41 - BSU - Stefan Cobbs 4 yd pass from Hank Bachmeier (Jonah Dalmas kick), 7 plays, 80 yards, TOP 03:57 • Broncos 7-0
- 4:25 - UTM - Colton Dowell 37 yd pass from Dresser Winn (Tyler Larco kick), 4 plays, 35 yards, TOP 01:33 • Tied 7-7

Second quarter

- 12:22 - BSU - Jonah Dalmas 37 yd field goal, 13 plays, 58 yards, TOP 06:57 • Broncos 10-7
- 5:18 - BSU - Jonah Dalmas 48 yd field goal, 9 plays, 56 yards, TOP 04:10 • Broncos 13-7
- 0:14 - BSU - George Holani 4 yd pass from Hank Bachmeier (Jonah Dalmas kick), 7 plays, 54 yards, TOP 03:15 • Broncos 20-7

Third quarter

- No scoring

Fourth quarter

- 7:27 - BSU - Jonah Dalmas 34 yd field goal, 14 plays, 35 yards, TOP 06:48 • Broncos 23-7
- 6:16 - BSU - George Holani 8 yd run (Jonah Dalmas kick), 2 plays, 23 yards, TOP 01:03 • Broncos 30-7

BSU Passing Leaders

- Hank Bachmeier – 18/25, 204 yards, 2 TD

BSU Rushing Leaders

- George Holani – 24 rushes, 110 yards, 1 TD

BSU Receiving Leaders

- Latrell Caples – 4 receptions, 48 yards

BSU Defense Leaders

- Tyreque Jones – 4 tackles

=== Fresno State ===
Fresno State Bulldogs at Boise State Broncos

Quarter	1	2	3	4	Total
Bulldogs	7	10	3	0	20
Broncos	7	13	7	13	40

at Albertsons Stadium, Boise, Idaho

- Date: Saturday, October 8, 2022
- Game time: 7:45 p.m. MDT
- Game attendance: 37,663
- Referee: David Alvarez
- TV announcers (FS1): Alex Faust (play-by-play), Petros Papadakis (analyst)
- Recap, Postgame Notes, Gamebook

Game information

First quarter

- 10:58 - BSU – Billy Bowens 9-yard pass from Taylen Green, Jonah Dalmas kick (Drive: 6 plays, 55 yards, 2:14; Boise State 7–0)
- 05:33 - FRES – Logan Fife 1-yard run, Abraham Montano kick (Drive: 4 plays, 11 yards, 1:58; Tied 7–7)

Second quarter

- 13:33 - BSU – Jonah Dalmas 24-yard field goal, (Drive: 15 plays, 68 yards, 6:55; Boise State 10–7)
- 09:58 - BSU – Jonah Dalmas 21-yard field goal, (Drive: 4 plays, 5 yards, 1:27; Boise State 13–7)
- 03:59 - FSU – Nikko Remigio 5-yard run, Abraham Montano kick (Drive: 12 plays, 72 yards, 5:53; Fresno State 14–13)
- 02:58 - BSU – Ashton Jeanty 13-yard run, Jonah Dalmas kick (Drive: 3 plays, 78 yards, 0:56; Boise State 20–14)
- 00:00 - FSU – Abraham Montano 35-yard field goal, (Drive: 14 plays, 66 yards, 2:53; Boise State 20–17)

Third quarter

- 08:57 - FSU – Abraham Montano 29-yard field goal, (Drive: 8 plays, 40 yards, 3:53; Tied 20–20)
- 00:46 - BSU – George Holani 5-yard pass from Taylen Green, Jonah Dalmas kick (Drive: 11 plays, 63 yards, 4:49; Boise State 27–20)

Fourth quarter

- 09:52 - BSU – Jonah Dalmas 33-yard field goal, (Drive: 8 plays, 36 yards, 4:17; Boise State 30–20)
- 06:32 - BSU – Jonah Dalmas 24-yard field goal, (Drive: 6 plays, 37 yards, 3:14; Boise State 33–20)
- 00:35 - BSU – Ashton Jeanty 12-yard run, Jonah Dalmas kick (Drive: 11 plays, 62 yards, 4:57; Boise State 40–20)

BSU Passing Leaders

- Taylen Green - 10/19, 127 yards, 2 TD, 1 INT

BSU Rushing Leaders

- George Holani - 17 rushes, 157 yards

BSU Receiving Leaders

- Riley Smith - 2 receptions, 44 yards

BSU Defense Leaders

- JL Skinner – 7 tackles

=== At Air Force ===
Boise State Broncos at Air Force Falcons

Quarter	1	2	3	4	Total
Broncos	10	9	0	0	19
Falcons	0	7	0	7	14

at Falcon Stadium, Colorado Springs, CO

- Date: October 22nd
- Game time: 5:00 p.m. MST
- Game weather: Sunny
- Game attendance: 25,254
- Referee: Christian Watson
- TV announcers (CBSSN): Rich Waltz (play-by-play), Aaron Taylor (analyst), Sherree Burruss (sideline)
- Recap, Postgame Notes, Gamebook

Game information

First quarter

- (5:14) BSU TD – Ashton Jeanty 1-yard rush, Jonah Dalmas kick
  Drive: 13 plays, 63 yards, 6:16; Boise State 7–0
- (2:38) BSU FG – Jonah Dalmas 42-yard field goal
  Drive: 4 plays, 2 yards, 1:11; Boise State 10–0

Second quarter

- (13:26) BSU FG – Jonah Dalmas 29-yard field goal
  Drive: 7 plays, 57 yards, 2:36; Boise State 13–0
- (9:40) BSU FG – Jonah Dalmas 51-yard field goal
  Drive: 5 plays, 30 yards, 1:30; Boise State 16–0
- (6:18) AF TD – Haaziq Daniels 15-yard rush, Matthew Dapore kick
  Drive: 7 plays, 75 yards, 3:22; Boise State 16–7
- (1:49) BSU FG – Jonah Dalmas 39-yard field goal
  Drive: 11 plays, 53 yards, 4:29; Boise State 19–7

Third quarter

- No scoring

Fourth quarter

- (9:15) AF TD – Brad Roberts 3-yard rush, Matthew Dapore kick
  Drive: 11 plays, 82 yards, 5:38; Boise State 19–14

BSU Passing Leaders

- Taylen Green – 16/24, 227 yards, 1 INT

BSU Rushing Leaders

- Ashton Jeanty – 15 rushes, 53 yards, 1 TD

BSU Receiving Leaders

- Eric McAlister – 1 reception, 44 yards

BSU Defense Leaders

- Ezekiel Noa – 7 tackles

=== Fresno State (Mountain West Championship Game) ===
Fresno State Bulldogs at Boise State Broncos

Quarter	1	2	3	4	Total
Bulldogs	0	14	0	14	28
Broncos	0	6	3	7	16

at Albertsons Stadium, Boise, Idaho

- Date: December 3rd, 2022
- Game time: 2:00 p.m. MST
- Game attendance: 24,037
- Referee: Tutashinda Salaam
- TV announcers (FOX): Tim Brando (play-by-play), Spencer Tillman (analyst), Petros Papadakis (sideline)
- Recap, Postgame Notes, Gamebook

Game information

First quarter

No scoring plays

Second quarter

- 10:16 - BSU – Jonah Dalmas 26-yard field goal (Drive: 15 plays, 71 yards, 5:55; Boise State 3–0)
- 03:54 - FSU – Nikko Remigio 70-yard punt return, Abraham Montano kick (Fresno State 7–3)
- 01:18 - FSU – Jordan Mims 2-yard run, Abraham Montano kick (Drive: 3 plays, 17 yards, 1:21; Fresno State 14–3)
- 00:02 - BSU – Jonah Dalmas 47-yard field goal (Drive: 8 plays, 45 yards, 1:16; Fresno State 14–6)

Third quarter

- 10:04 - BSU – Jonah Dalmas 44-yard field goal (Drive: 8 plays, 24 yards, 3:12; Fresno State 14–9)

Fourth quarter

- 14:49 - FSU – Zane Pope 22-yard pass from Jake Haener, Abraham Montano kick (Drive: 13 plays, 87 yards, 6:16; Fresno State 21–9)
- 09:47 - FSU – Jordan Mims 3-yard run, Abraham Montano kick (Drive: 6 plays, 34 yards, 3:36; Fresno State 28–9)
- 05:17 - BSU – Davis Koetter 52-yard pass from Taylen Green, Jonah Dalmas kick (Drive: 4 plays, 64 yards, 1:08; Fresno State 28–16)

BSU Passing Leaders

- Taylen Green - 17/38, 175 yards, 1 TD, 2 INT

BSU Rushing Leaders

- George Holani - 13 rushes, 74 yards

BSU Receiving Leaders

- Davis Koetter - 5 receptions, 93 yards, 1 TD

BSU Defense Leaders

- Rodney Robinson – 7 tackles

=== Vs. North Texas (Frisco Bowl) ===
North Texas Mean Green vs Boise State Broncos

Quarter	1	2	3	4	Total
Mean Green	3	7	14	8	32
Broncos	0	6	22	7	35

at Toyota Stadium, Frisco, TX

- Date: December 17th, 2022
- Game time: 7:15 p.m. MST
- Game weather: Temperature: 39 °F (4 °C) • Wind: NE 1 mph (1.6 km/h) • Weather: Clear
- Game attendance: 12,211
- Referee: Trennis Livingston
- TV announcers (ESPN): Dave Neal (play-by-play), Deuce McAllister (analyst), Andraya Carter (sideline)
- Recap, Postgame Notes, Gamebook

Game information

First quarter

- 09:24 - UNT - Mooney, Ethan 27 yd field goal, 11 plays, 60 yards, TOP 05:30 • Mean Green 3-0

Second quarter

- 09:58 - BSU - Jonah Dalmas 24 yd field goal, 6 plays, 8 yards, TOP 02:17 • Tied 3–3
- 07:38 - UNT - Ragsdale, Ikaika 1 yd run (Mooney, Ethan kick), 6 plays, 65 yards, TOP 02:20 • Mean Green 10–3
- 04:43 - BSU - Jonah Dalmas 37 yd field goal, 6 plays, 55 yards, TOP 02:55 • Mean Green 10–6

Third quarter

- 12:40 - BSU - Green, Taylen 3 yd run (Hutton, Mason pass from Riddle, Connor), 6 plays, 75 yards, TOP 02:20 • Broncos 14–10
- 08:32 - UNT - Roberts, Jake 17 yd pass from Earle, Stone (Mooney, Ethan kick), 10 plays, 71 yards, TOP 04:02 • Mean Green 17–14
- 06:35 - BSU - McAlister, Eric 24 yd pass from Green, Taylen (Jonah Dalmas kick), 5 plays, 75 yards, TOP 01:57 • Broncos 21–17
- 05:14 - UNT - Shorter, Jyaire 30 yd pass from Aune, Austin (Mooney, Ethan kick), 4 plays, 51 yards, TOP 01:11 • Mean Green 24–21
- 00:25 - BSU - Green, Taylen 19 yd run (Jonah Dalmas kick), 10 plays, 75 yards, TOP 04:49 • Broncos 28–24

Fourth quarter

- 12:05 - BSU - Jeanty, Ashton 1 yd run (Jonah Dalmas kick), 5 plays, 30 yards, TOP 02:13 • Broncos 35–24
- 08:17 - UNT - Ragsdale, Ikaika 5 yd run (Aune, Austin run), 11 plays, 90 yards, TOP 03:38 • Broncos 35–32

BSU Passing Leaders

- Taylen Green – 13/22, 137 yards, 1 TD

BSU Rushing Leaders

- Ashton Jeanty – 28 rushes, 178 yards, 2 TD

BSU Receiving Leaders

- Latrell Caples – 6 receptions, 87 yards

BSU Defense Leaders

- Alexander Teubner – 12 tackles

== Players drafted into the NFL ==
Round	Pick	Player	Position	NFL Club
6	183	JL Skinner	S	Denver Broncos
6	200	Scott Matlock	DT	Los Angeles Chargers
