= Andy Avalos =

American football player and coach (born 1981)

Current position
- Title: Interim head coach, defensive coordinator
- Team: TCU
- Conference: Big 12
- Record: 0–0

Biographical details
- Born: November 5, 1981 (age 45); Corona, California, U.S.

Playing career
- 2001–2004: Boise State
- Position: Linebacker

Coaching career (HC unless noted)
- 2006–2008: Colorado (GA)
- 2009–2010: Nebraska–Kearney (DL)
- 2011: Sacramento State (GA)
- 2012–2013: Boise State (DL)
- 2014–2015: Boise State (LB)
- 2016–2018: Boise State (DC/LB)
- 2019–2020: Oregon (DC/ILB)
- 2021–2023: Boise State
- 2024–present: TCU (DC)

Head coaching record
- Overall: 22–14
- Bowls: 1–0

Accomplishments and honors

Championships
- 1 MW Mountain Division (2022)

Awards
- MW Coach of the Year (2022)

Andrew Avalos (born November 5, 1981) is an American college football coach and former player. He is the defensive coordinator for Texas Christian University. He previously worked as an assistant at schools including Boise State University and Oregon before returning to Boise State as head coach.

== Playing career ==
During his tenure as a linebacker at Boise State, he amassed 365 tackles, which was fourth all-time in Boise State history. He also led Boise State in tackles every year from 2002 to 2004. He was named first-team All-Western Athletic Conference honors in 2003 and 2004. In 2016, he was listed in the top 30 players in Boise State history since Boise State installed their famous blue turf in 1986.

Avalos had a 92-yard interception return for a touchdown in the 2004 Liberty Bowl.

== Coaching career ==
=== Early coaching career ===
After coaching the linebackers at Corona High School, which was where he went to high school, he joined the Colorado coaching staff as a graduate assistant under Dan Hawkins in 2006. He mainly helped Brian Cabral with the outside linebackers there. He was there until 2008.

He left Colorado for NCAA Division II school Nebraska-Kearney to coach the defensive line. While he was there, Nebraska-Kearney went 20–4 and made the NCAA Division II playoffs both years he was there. He coached linebackers at Sacramento State during the 2011 season.

=== Boise State ===
Avalos was hired at his alma mater, Boise State, in 2012 as their defensive line coach. Boise State’s rush defense ranked 11th nationally in sacks in 2012 (2.92), and tied for 30th in tackles-for-loss (6.7) in 2013. He was also notable during this time for coaching future NFL Pro-Bowler DeMarcus Lawrence. Lawrence was ranked tied for 18th in sacks per game (0.86) in 2012, and tied for 10th nationally in 2013 (0.88).

Before 2014, he was moved to become Boise State’s linebackers coach. Boise State forced 31 turnovers in both 2014, where they ranked ninth, and 2015, where they ranked fifth.

Following his positional coaching jobs at Boise State, he was promoted to defensive coordinator in 2016. His defenses were consistent, as they ranked 29th, 38th, and 30th from 2016–2018 in team defense. He coached 2017 Mountain West Player of the Year Leighton Vander Esch, three–time first team All-Mountain West recipient Curtis Weaver, and five different first team All-Mountain West players when he was the defensive coordinator.

=== Oregon ===
On February 27, 2019, Avalos was hired to serve as Oregon’s defensive coordinator, replacing Jim Leavitt. Under Avalos, Oregon’s team defense went from 49th in 2018 to ninth in 2019. Also in 2019, the #2 recruit in the country according to 247Sports.com, Kayvon Thibodeaux, committed to Oregon. He had nine sacks and one forced fumble in his first season as a Duck.

=== Return to Boise State ===
On January 8, 2021, Boise State hired Avalos as their new head football coach. With Avalos' hire, he joined a small but growing list of Latino head coaches in Division I College Football.

After a 2–2 start, Avalos led the Broncos to an undefeated (8–0) conference regular season to reach the Mountain West Conference Championship Game, which the Broncos lost 28–16 to Fresno State. He then led Boise State to their first ten-win season since 2019 with a 35–32 victory over North Texas in the Frisco Bowl. For his efforts, he was named Mountain West Conference Coach of the Year.

On November 12, with Boise State sitting 5–5 (4–2 in Mountain West play), Avalos was fired with two games remaining in the regular season. Defensive coordinator Spencer Danielson was named interim head coach for the remainder of the season; the Broncos won their two remaining conference games to finish in a three-way Mountain West tie that saw Boise State reach and win the 2023 Mountain West Conference Football Championship Game. Avalos finished 22–14 (17–6 in conference play) in three years with the program.

=== TCU ===
On December 11, 2023, TCU hired Avalos as their defensive coordinator replacing Joe Gillespie. On November 22, 2026, Avalos was named interim head coach after Sonny Dykes was fired.

== Personal life ==
Avalos and his wife, Summer, have two daughters.

== Head coaching record ==
Year	Team	Overall	Conference	Standing	Bowl/playoffs
Boise State Broncos (Mountain West Conference) (2021–2023)
2021	Boise State	7–5	5–3	3rd (Mountain)	C Arizona
2022	Boise State	10–4	8–0	1st (Mountain)	W Frisco
2023	Boise State	5–5 (Note: Boise State fired Avalos with two games remaining)	4–2		
Boise State:		22–14	17–5		
TCU Horned Frogs (Big 12 Conference) (2026–present)
2026	TCU	0–0 (Note: Avalos replaced Sonny Dykes with one game remain)	0–0		
TCU:		0–0	0–0		
Total:		22–14			
National championship Conference title Conference division title or championship game berth
