= 2022 Nevada Wolf Pack football team =

American college football season

2022 Nevada Wolf Pack football
- Conference: Mountain West Conference
- West Division
- Record: 2–10 (0–8 MW)
- Head coach: Ken Wilson (1st season)
- Offensive coordinator: Derek Sage (1st season)
- Offensive scheme: Multiple
- Co-defensive coordinators: Kwame Agyeman (1st season); Mike Bethea (1st season)
- Base defense: 4–2–5
- Home stadium: Mackay Stadium

2022 Mountain West Conference football standings
	Conf.			Overall
Team	W		L	W		L
Mountain Division
Boise State xy	8	–	0	10	–	4
Air Force	5	–	3	10	–	3
Wyoming	5	–	3	7	–	6
Utah State	5	–	3	6	–	7
Colorado State	3	–	5	3	–	9
New Mexico	0	–	8	2	–	10
West Division
No. 24 Fresno State xy$	7	–	1	10	–	4
San Diego State	5	–	3	7	–	6
San Jose State	5	–	3	7	–	5
UNLV	3	–	5	5	–	7
Hawaii	2	–	6	3	–	10
Nevada	0	–	8	2	–	10
Championship: Fresno State 28, Boise State 16
$ – Conference champion; x – Division champion/co-champions; y – Championship game participant; Rankings from AP Poll

The 2022 Nevada Wolf Pack football team represented the University of Nevada, Reno as a member of the Mountain West Conference during the 2022 NCAA Division I FBS football season. They were led by first-year head coach Ken Wilson. The Wolf Pack played their home games at Mackay Stadium in Reno, Nevada.

== Schedule ==
Nevada and the Mountain West Conference announced the 2022 football schedule on February 16, 2022.

Date	Time	Opponent	Site	TV	Result	Attendance
August 27	7:00 p.m.	at New Mexico State*	Aggie Memorial Stadium; Las Cruces, NM	ESPN2	W 23–12	23,371
September 3	2:30 p.m.	Texas State*	Mackay Stadium; Reno, NV	KNSN-TV/BS SoCal	W 38–14	13,260
September 10	2:30 p.m.	No. 8 (FCS) Incarnate Word*	Mackay Stadium; Reno, NV	KNSN-TV/BS SoCal	L 41–55	14,092
September 17	4:30 p.m.	at Iowa*	Kinnick Stadium; Iowa City, IA	BTN	L 0–27	69,250
September 23	5:00 p.m.	at Air Force	Falcon Stadium; Colorado Springs, CO	FS1	L 20–48	20,506
October 7	7:00 p.m.	Colorado State	Mackay Stadium; Reno, NV	FS1	L 14–17	18,255
October 15	9:00 p.m.	at Hawaii	Clarence T. C. Ching Athletics Complex; Honolulu, HI	KNSN-TV/SPEC PPV	L 16–31	9,231
October 22	7:30 p.m.	San Diego State	Mackay Stadium; Reno, NV	CBSSN	L 7–23	16,363
October 29	7:30 p.m.	at San Jose State	CEFCU Stadium; San Jose, CA	CBSSN	L 28–35	17,117
November 12	7:30 p.m.	Boise State	Mackay Stadium; Reno, NV (rivalry)	CBSSN	L 3–41	14,960
November 19	7:30 p.m.	Fresno State	Mackay Stadium; Reno, NV	CBSSN	L 14–41	12,501
November 26	3:00 p.m.	at UNLV	Allegiant Stadium; Paradise, NV (Fremont Cannon)	KNSN-TV/KVVU	L 22–27	24,873
*Non-conference game; Rankings from AP Poll (and CFP Rankings, after November 1) - Released prior to game; All times are in Pacific time

== Game summaries ==
=== At New Mexico State ===
Game One – Nevada Wolfpack (0–0) vs New Mexico State Aggies (0–0)

Quarter	1	2	3	4	Total
Wolf Pack	0	17	0	6	23
Aggies	0	2	7	3	12

at Aggie Memorial Stadium • Las Cruces, NM

- Date: August 27th, 2022
- Game time: 7:00 p.m. PST
- Game weather: Cloudy, 77 °F (25 °C)
- Game attendance: 23,371
- Referee: Steve Baron
- TV announcers (ESPN2): Roy Philpott (play-by-play), Andre Ware (analysis), Paul Carcaterra (sidelines)

Game information

First quarter

No scoring plays

Second quarter

- NMSU – Shane Illingworth tackled in end zone, 13:38. Aggies 2–0.
- NEV – Devonte Lee 32-yard run (Brandon Talton kick), 10:02. Wolf Pack 7–2. Drive: 4 plays, 80 yards, 1:28.
- NEV – Brandon Talton 28-yard field goal, 4:08. Wolf Pack 10–2. Drive: 5 plays, 18 yards, 2:26.
- NEV – Devonte Lee 4-yard run (Brandon Talton kick), 0:42. Wolf Pack 17–2. Drive: 5 plays, 18 yards, 2:26.

Third quarter

- NMSU – Kordell David 10-yard pass from Gavin Frakes (Ethan Albertson kick), 5:19. Wolf Pack 17–9. Drive: 5 plays, 85 yards, 2:50.

Fourth quarter

- NEV – Brandon Talton 34-yard field goal, 14:56. Wold Pack 20–9. Drive: 13 plays, 57 yards, 5:23.
- NMSU – Ethan Albertson 46-yard field goal, 8:12. Wolf Pack 20–12. Drive: 11 plays, 47 yards, 6:35.
- NEV – Brandon Talton 38-yard field goal, 1:35. Wolf Pack 23–12. Drive: 15 plays, 60 yards, 6:46.

Passing

- NEV – Shane Illingworth – 7/12, 51 yards
- NMSU – Gavin Frakes – 9/13, 143 yards, TD, INT

Rushing

- NEV – Toa Taua – 19 carries, 109 yards
- NMSU – Diego Pavia – 5 carries, 36 yards

Receiving

- NEV – Tyrese Mack – 4 receptions, 40 yards
- NMSU – Justice Powers – 2 receptions, 74 yards

=== Texas State ===
	1	2	3	4	Total
Bobcats	0	7	0	7	14
Wolf Pack	14	0	24	0	38

Statistics	TXST	NEV
First downs	15	13
Total yards	282	278
Rushing yards	-11	134
Passing yards	293	144
Turnovers	4	0
Time of possession	30:33	29:27

Team	Category	Player	Statistics
Texas State	Passing	Layne Hatcher	34/52, 293 yards, 2 TD, 2 INT
Texas State	Rushing	Jahmyl Jeter	10 rushes, 22 yards
Texas State	Receiving	Ashtyn Hawkins	11 receptions, 101 yards, TD
Nevada	Passing	Shane Illingworth	11/13, 101 yards
Nevada	Rushing	Jake Barlage	1 rush, 37 yards
Nevada	Receiving	Jamaal Bell	6 receptions, 60 yards

=== No. 8 (FCS) Incarnate Word ===
Incarnate Word Cardinals at Nevada Wolf Pack

Quarter	1	2	3	4	Total
No. 8 (FCS) Cardinals	9	15	14	17	55
Wolf Pack	17	0	14	10	41

at Mackay Stadium, Reno, NV

- Date: September 10
- Game time: 2:30 p.m. PST
- Game weather: Temperature: 87 • Wind: SE 2 mph • Weather: Cloudy
- Game attendance: 14,092
- Referee: Christian Watson
- TV announcers (KNSN-TV/Bally Sports SoCal): Alex Margulies (play-by-play), Lucas Weber (analyst) and Shannon Kelly (sideline)
- Box Score

Game information

First Quarter

- NEV – 11:51 Brandon Talton 34 yard field goal
  NEV 3–0 Drive: 7 plays, 15 yards, 2:41
- NEV – 10:38 Toa Taua 11 yard run, Brandon Talton kick
  NEV 10–0 Drive: 3 plays, 33 yards, 1:09
- UIW – 5:57 Carson Mohr 38 yard field goal
  NEV 10–3 Drive: 7 plays, 21 yards, 1:56
- NEV – 1:45 BJ Casteel 7 yard pass from Nate Cox, Brandon Talton kick
  NEV 17–3 Drive: 12 plays, 75 yards, 4:12
- UIW – 0:30 Marcus Cooper 21 yard run, Carson Mohr kick blocked
  NEV 17–9 Drive: 4 plays, 75 yards, 1:15

Second Quarter

- UIW – 9:07 Roger McCuller 1 yard pass from Lindsey Scott Jr., Carson Mohr kick
  NEV 17–16 Drive: 4 plays, 82 yards, 1:13
- UIW – 3:28 Jarrell Wiley 18 yard run, Lindsey Scott Jr. rush
  UIW 24–17 Drive: 7 plays, 65 yards, 1:50

Third Quarter

- UIW – 12:05 Kelechi Anyalebechi 59 yard fumble recovery, Carson Mohr kick
  UIW 31–17
- UIW – 9:24 Darion Chafin 44 yard pass from Lindsey Scott Jr., Carson Mohr kick
  UIW 38–17 Drive: 7 plays, 56 yards, 1:32
- NEV – 5:55 Nate Cox 3 yard run, Brandon Talton kick
  UIW 38–24 Drive: 10 plays, 75 yards, 3:29
- NEV – 0:19 Toa Taua 26 yard pass from Nate Cox, Brandon Talton kick
  UIW 38–31 Drive: 5 plays, 75 yards, 1:18

Fourth Quarter

- UIW – 13:05 Carson Mohr 30 yard field goal
  UIW 41–31 Drive: 8 plays, 71 yards, 2:09
- NEV – 10:33 Brandon Talton 40 yard field goal
  UIW 41–34 Drive: 7 plays, 53 yards, 2:32
- UIW – 8:19 Marcus Cooper 10 yard pass from Lindsey Scott, Jr., Carson Mohr kick
  UIW 48–34 Drive: 6 plays, 75 yards, 2:14
- NEV – 2:13 Devonte Lee 6 yard run, Brandon Talton kick
  UIW 48–41 Drive: 6 plays, 75 yards, 2:01
- UIW – 1:10 Darion Chafin 41 yard pass from Lindsey Scott Jr., Carson Mohr kick
  UIW 55–41 Drive: 3 plays, 42 yards, 0:59

Passing

- UIW – Lindsey Scott Jr. 18/25, 406 YDS, 4 TD, 1 INT
- NEV – Nate Cox 22/43, 302 YDS, 2 TD

Rushing

- UIW – Marcus Cooper 16 ATT, 84 YDS, 1 TD
- NEV – Toa Taua 24 ATT, 101 YDS, 1 TD

Receiving

- UIW – Darion Chafin 7 REC, 262 YDS, 2 TD
- NEV – BJ Casteel 5 REC, 85 YDS, 1 TD

=== At Iowa ===
	1	2	3	4	Total
Wolf Pack	0	0	0	0	0
Hawkeyes	14	3	3	7	27

Statistics	NEV	IOWA
First downs	10	15
Total yards	151	337
Rushing yards	69	162
Passing yards	82	175
Turnovers	1	0
Time of possession	30:03	29:57

Team	Category	Player	Statistics
Nevada	Passing	Shane Illingworth	14/28, 82 yards, INT
Nevada	Rushing	Devonte Lee	9 carries, 33 yards
Nevada	Receiving	Dalevon Campbell	3 receptions, 21 yards
Iowa	Passing	Spencer Petras	14/26, 175 yards, TD
Iowa	Rushing	Kaleb Johnson	7 carries, 103 yards, 2 TD
Iowa	Receiving	Arland Bruce IV	3 receptions, 50 yards, TD

=== At Air Force ===
Air Force Falcons (2–1) vs. Nevada Wolf Pack (2–2)

Quarter	1	2	3	4	Total
Wolf Pack	0	7	0	13	20
Falcons	10	14	17	7	48

at Falcon Stadium, Colorado Springs, CO

- Date: September 23, 2022
- Game time: 6:00 p.m. MDT
- Game weather: Sunny
- Game attendance: 20,506
- Referee: Tuta Salaam
- TV: FS1
- ESPN – Roberts, Brittain spark Air Force in 48-20 win over Nevada

Game information

First quarter

- (04:36) AF FG – Matthew Dapore 41-yard field goal
  Drive: 17 plays, 48 yards, 9:02; Air Force 3–0
- (02:11) AF TD – Ben Brittain 80-yard pass to David Cormier, Matthew Dapore kick
  Drive: 1 plays, 80 yards, 0:10; Air Force 10–0

Second quarter

- (12:16) NEV TD – Nate Cox 10-yard rush, Matthew Killam kick
  Drive: 10 plays, 75 yards, 4:55; Air Force 10–7
- (09:17) AF TD – Brad Roberts 27-yard rush, Matthew Dapore kick
  Drive: 7 plays, 75 yards, 2:59; Air Force 17–7
- (00:47) AF TD – Brad Roberts 1-yard rush, Matthew Dapore kick
  Drive: 14 plays, 77 yards, 7:08; Air Force 24–7

Third quarter

- (11:54) AF TD – Brad Roberts 9-yard rush, Matthew Dapore kick
  Drive: 6 plays, 70 yards, 3:06; Air Force 31–7
- (05:44) AF FG – Matthew Dapore 51-yard field goal
  Drive: 9 plays, 25 yards, 4:52; Air Force 34–7
- (00:25) AF TD – Emmanuel Michel 26-yard rush, Anthony Rodriguez kick
  Drive: 6 plays, 65 yards, 3:45; Air Force 41–7

Fourth quarter

- (13:17) NEV TD – Toa Taua 40-yard rush, Matthew Killam kick
  Drive: 5 plays, 75 yards, 2:08; Air Force 41–14
- (03:35) AF TD – Aiden Calvert 6-yard rush, Anthony Rodriguez kick
  Drive: 15 plays, 75 yards, 9:42; Air Force 48–14
- (02:52) NEV TD – Toa Taua 6-yard rush, Matthew Killam PAT failed
  Drive: 2 plays, 64 yards, 0:33; Air Force 48–20

Passing

- NEV – Nate Cox: 12/20, 130
- AF – Ben Brittain: 1/1, 80 yards, 1 TD

Rushing

- NEV – Toa Taua: 7 carries, 73 yards, 2 TD
- AF – Brad Roberts: 20 carries, 123 yards, 3 TD

Receiving

- NEV – Jamaal Bell: 3 receptions, 65 yards
- AF – David Cormier: 1 reception, 80 yards, 1 TD

Defense

- NEV – Drue Watts: 11 total tackles (7 solo, 4 assisted), 1 tackle for loss
- AF – Alec Mock: 8 total tackles (5 solo, 3 assisted), 0.5 tackle for loss

Statistics	NEV	AF
First downs	11	30
3rd down efficiency	4–9	10–15
4th down efficiency	0–0	3–3
Plays–yards	38–242	78–541
Rushes–yards	18–112	75–461
Passing yards	130	80
Passing: Comp–Att–Int	12–20–0	1–3–0
Penalties–yards	4–30	5–50
Turnovers	0	0
Time of possession	16:19	43:41

=== Colorado State ===
	1	2	3	4	Total
Rams	14	0	0	3	17
Wolf Pack	0	7	0	7	14

Statistics	CSU	NEV
First downs	13	19
Total yards	255	358
Rushing yards	177	114
Passing yards	78	244
Turnovers	3	2
Time of possession	28:13	31:47

Team	Category	Player	Statistics
Colorado State	Passing	Brayden Fowler-Nicolosi	11/22, 78 yards, 2 INT
Colorado State	Rushing	Avery Morrow	24 carries, 168 yards
Colorado State	Receiving	Tory Horton	9 receptions, 64 yards
Nevada	Passing	Nate Cox	20/42, 244 yards, INT
Nevada	Rushing	Toa Taua	23 carries, 80 yards, 2 TD
Nevada	Receiving	BJ Casteel	9 receptions, 87 yards

=== At Hawaii ===
Nevada Wolf Pack (2–4) at Hawaii Rainbow Warriors (1–5)

Quarter	1	2	3	4	Total
Wolf Pack	7	6	3	0	16
Rainbow Warriors	14	7	0	10	31

at Clarence T. C. Ching Athletics Complex, Honolulu, HI

- Date: October 15, 2022
- Game time: 9:00 p.m. PT
- Game attendance: 9,231
- TV announcers (Spectrum PPV): Kanoa Leahey (play-by-play), Rich Miano (analyst), Scott Robbs (sideline)

=== Fresno State ===
Game Eleven – Fresno State Bulldogs (6–4) at Nevada Wolf Pack (2–8)

Quarter	1	2	3	4	Total
Bulldogs	17	7	3	14	41
Wolf Pack	0	0	7	7	14

at Mackay Stadium • Reno, Nevada

- Date: Saturday, November 19, 2022
- Game time: 7:30 p.m. PST
- Game weather: Partly Cloudy • Temperature: 49 °F (9 °C) • Wind:
- Game attendance: 12,501
- Referee: Timothy Davis
- TV announcers (CBSSN): Chris Lewis (play-by-play), & Robert Turbin (analyst)

Game information

First quarter

- (9:29) FRES – Jake Haener 1-yard run, Dylan Lynch kick (Drive: 10 plays, 65 yards, 4:05; Fresno State 7–0)
- (5:50) FRES – Dylan Lynch 43-yard field goal (Drive: 7 plays, 49 yards, 1:37; Fresno State 10–0)
- (2:31) FRES – Mac Dalena 22-yard pass from Jake Haener, Dylan Lynch kick (Drive: 3 plays, 31 yards, 0:50; Fresno State 17–0)

Second quarter

- (6:34) FRES – Raymond Pauwels 3-yard pass from Jake Haener, Dylan Lynch kick (Drive: 11 plays, 75 yards, 4:31; Fresno State 24–0)

Third quarter

- (1:18) FRES – Dylan Lynch 35-yard field goal (Drive: 7 plays, 42 yards, 1:51; Fresno State 27–0)
- (0:40) NEV – Dalevon Campbell 73-yard pass from Nate Cox, Brandon Talton kick (Drive: 2 plays, 75 yards, 0:38; Fresno State 27–7)

Fourth quarter

- (10:03) FRES – Jordan Mims 22-yard run, Dylan Lynch kick (Drive: 7 plays, 62 yards, 3:44; Fresno State 34–7)
- (5:21) FRES – Jake Haener 1-yard run, Dylan Lynch kick (Drive: 4 plays, 97 yards, 2:02; Fresno State 41–7)
- (1:44) NEV – BJ Casteel 28-yard pass from Nate Cox, Brandon Talton kick (Drive: 10 plays, 75 yards, 3:37; Fresno State 41–14)

Statistics	FRES	NEV
First downs	26	16
Plays–yards	75–524	68–389
Rushes–yards	33–163	30–146
Passing yards	361	243
Passing: comp–att–int	29–42–0	16–38–2
Time of possession	34:24	25:36

Team	Category	Player	Statistics
Fresno State	Passing	Jake Haener	29/42, 361 yards, 2 TD
Fresno State	Rushing	Jordan Mims	19 carries, 156 yards, TD
Fresno State	Receiving	Jalen Cropper	7 receptions, 136 yards
Nevada	Passing	Nate Cox	16/38, 243 yards, 2 TD, 2 INT
Nevada	Rushing	Toa Taua	17 carries, 93 yards
Nevada	Receiving	Dalevon Campbell	3 receptions, 120 yards, TD
