= 2022 Mountain West Conference Football Championship Game =

- Conference Championship
Fresno State Bulldogs	Boise State Broncos
(8–4)	(9–3)
28	16
Head coach: Jeff Tedford	Head coach: Andy Avalos
	1	2	3	4	Total
Fresno State	0	14	0	14	28
Boise State	0	6	3	7	16
- Date: December 3, 2022
- Season: 2022
- Stadium: Albertsons Stadium
- Location: Boise, ID
- MVP: Offensive: Jake Haener, QB, Fresno State; Defensive: Cam Lockridge, DB, Fresno State
- Favorite: Boise State by 3
- Referee: Tuta Salaam

United States TV coverage
- Network: Fox
- Announcers: Tim Brando, Spencer Tillman and Petros Papadakis

2022 Mountain West Conference football standings
	Conf.			Overall
Team	W		L	W		L
Mountain Division
Boise State xy	8	–	0	10	–	4
Air Force	5	–	3	10	–	3
Wyoming	5	–	3	7	–	6
Utah State	5	–	3	6	–	7
Colorado State	3	–	5	3	–	9
New Mexico	0	–	8	2	–	10
West Division
No. 24 Fresno State xy$	7	–	1	10	–	4
San Diego State	5	–	3	7	–	6
San Jose State	5	–	3	7	–	5
UNLV	3	–	5	5	–	7
Hawaii	2	–	6	3	–	10
Nevada	0	–	8	2	–	10
Championship: Fresno State 28, Boise State 16
$ – Conference champion; x – Division champion/co-champions; y – Championship game participant; Rankings from AP Poll

The 2022 Mountain West Conference Football Championship Game was a college football game which was played on December 3, 2022, at Albertsons Stadium in Boise, Idaho. It was the tenth edition of the Mountain West Conference Football Championship Game and determined the champion of the Mountain West Conference (MWC) for the 2022 season. The game began at 2:00 p.m. MST and aired on Fox. The game featured the Boise State Broncos, the Mountain Division champions, and the Fresno State Bulldogs, the West Division champions. Boise State won the right to host the game as a result of defeating the Fresno State Bulldogs earlier in the 2022 season.

== Teams ==
=== Fresno State Bulldogs ===
Fresno State clinched their spot in the championship game following their defeat of Nevada on November 19. Following a disappointing 1-4 start to the season, the Bulldogs won their next 6 games.

=== Boise State Broncos ===
Boise State clinched their spot in the championship game following their defeat of Wyoming on November 19. The win also ensured they would host the game.

== Game summary ==
2022 Mountain West Conference Football Championship Game
Fresno State Bulldogs (8–4, 7–1) vs. Boise State Broncos (9–3, 8–0)

Quarter	1	2	3	4	Total
Fresno State	0	14	0	14	28
Boise State	0	6	3	7	16

at Albertsons Stadium • Boise, ID

- Date: Saturday, December 3, 2022
- Game time: 2:00 p.m. MDT
- Game weather: 34 °F (1 °C) • Sunny • Wind 9 mph (14 km/h) ESE
- Game attendance: 24,037
- Referee: Tuta Salaam
- TV announcers (Fox): Tim Brando, Spencer Tillman, Petros Papadakis

Game information

First Quarter

- No scoring plays

Second Quarter

- (10:16) BSU – Jonah Dalmas 26 yard field goal (Drive: 15 plays, 71 yards, 5:55; Boise State 3–0)
- (3:54) FRES – Nikko Remigio 70 yard punt return, Abraham Montano kick (Fresno state 7–3)
- (1:18) FRES – Jordan Mims 2 yard rush, Abraham Montano kick (Drive: 3 plays, 17 yards, 1:21; Fresno State 14–3)
- (0:02) BSU – Jonah Dalmas 47 yard field goal (Drive: 8 plays, 45 yards, 1:16; Fresno State 14–6)

Third Quarter

- (10:04) BSU – Jonah Dalmas 44 yard field goal (Drive: 8 plays, 24 yards, 3:12; Fresno State 14–9)

Fourth Quarter

- (14:49) FRES – Zane Pope 22 yard pass from Jake Haener, Abraham Montano kick (Drive: 13 plays, 87 yards, 6:16; Fresno State 21–9)
- (9:47) FRES – Jordan Mims 3 yard rush, Abraham Montano kick (Drive: 6 plays, 34 yards, 3:36; Fresno State 28–9)
- (5:17) BSU – Davis Koetter 52 yard pass from Taylen Green, Jonah Dalmas kick (Drive: 4 plays, 64 yards, 1:08; Fresno State 28–16)

Statistics	Fresno State	Boise State
First downs	14	15
plays–yards	62–245	68–321
Rushes/yards	35–61	30–146
Passing yards	184	175
Passing: Comp–Att–Int	17–27–0	17–38–2
Time of possession	33:31	26:29

Team	Category	Player	Statistics
Fresno State	Passing	Jake Haener	17/27, 184 yards, 1 TD
Fresno State	Rushing	Jordan Mims	25 carries, 83 yards, 2 TDs
Fresno State	Receiving	Nikko Remigio	5 receptions, 68 yards
Boise State	Passing	Taylen Green	17/38, 175 yards, 1 TD, 2 INTs
Boise State	Rushing	George Holani	13 carries, 74 yards
Boise State	Receiving	Davis Koetter	5 receptions, 93 yards, 1 TD
