= 2022 Wyoming Cowboys football team =

American college football season

2022 Wyoming Cowboys football

Arizona Bowl, L 27–30 ^{OT}vs. Ohio
- Conference: Mountain West Conference
- Mountain Division
- Record: 7–6 (5–3 MW)
- Head coach: Craig Bohl (9th season)
- Offensive coordinator: Tim Polasek (2nd season)
- Offensive scheme: Pro-style, West Coast
- Defensive coordinator: Jay Sawvel (3rd season)
- Base defense: 4–3
- Home stadium: War Memorial Stadium

2022 Mountain West Conference football standings
	Conf.			Overall
Team	W		L	W		L
Mountain Division
Boise State xy	8	–	0	10	–	4
Air Force	5	–	3	10	–	3
Wyoming	5	–	3	7	–	6
Utah State	5	–	3	6	–	7
Colorado State	3	–	5	3	–	9
New Mexico	0	–	8	2	–	10
West Division
No. 24 Fresno State xy$	7	–	1	10	–	4
San Diego State	5	–	3	7	–	6
San Jose State	5	–	3	7	–	5
UNLV	3	–	5	5	–	7
Hawaii	2	–	6	3	–	10
Nevada	0	–	8	2	–	10
Championship: Fresno State 28, Boise State 16
$ – Conference champion; x – Division champion/co-champions; y – Championship game participant; Rankings from AP Poll

The 2022 Wyoming Cowboys football team represented the University of Wyoming as a member Mountain West Conference (MW) during the 2022 NCAA Division I FBS football season. Led by ninth-year head coach Craig Bohl, the Cowboys compiled an overall record of 7–6 record with mark 5–3 in conference play, placing third in the MW's Mountain Division. Wyoming was invited to the Arizona Bowl, where the Cowboys lost to Ohio in overtime. The team played home games at War Memorial Stadium in Laramie, Wyoming.

== Schedule ==
Date	Time	Opponent	Site	TV	Result	Attendance
August 27	2:00 p.m.	at Illinois*	Memorial Stadium; Champaign, IL	BTN	L 6–38	37,832
September 3	1:30 p.m.	Tulsa*	War Memorial Stadium; Laramie, WY	FS1	W 40–37 ^{2OT}	20,574
September 10	2:00 p.m.	Northern Colorado*	War Memorial Stadium; Laramie, WY	MW Network	W 33–10	22,863
September 16	6:00 p.m.	Air Force	War Memorial Stadium; Laramie, WY	CBSSN	W 17–14	18,277
September 24	8:15 p.m.	at No. 19 BYU*	LaVell Edwards Stadium; Provo, UT	ESPN2	L 24–38	60,092
October 1	7:30 p.m.	San Jose State	War Memorial Stadium; Laramie, WY	CBSSN	L 16–33	17,765
October 8	7:00 p.m.	at New Mexico	University Stadium; Albuquerque, NM	CBSSN	W 27–14	14,226
October 22	7:45 p.m.	Utah State^{†}	War Memorial Stadium; Laramie, WY (rivalry)	FS2	W 28–14	21,420
October 29	10:00 p.m.	at Hawaii	Clarence T. C. Ching Athletics Complex; Honolulu, HI (rivalry)	SPEC PPV	W 27–20	9,346
November 12	5:00 p.m.	at Colorado State	Canvas Stadium; Fort Collins, CO (rivalry)	CBSSN	W 14–13	30,300
November 19	5:00 p.m.	Boise State	War Memorial Stadium; Laramie, WY	CBSSN	L 17–20	17,345
November 25	8:00 p.m.	at Fresno State	Bulldog Stadium; Fresno, CA	FS1	L 0–30	40,214
December 30	1:30 p.m.	vs. Ohio*	Arizona Stadium; Tucson, AZ (Arizona Bowl)	Barstool.TV	L 27–30 ^{OT}	27,691
*Non-conference game; ^{†}Homecoming; Rankings from AP Poll (and CFP Rankings, after November 1) - Released prior to game; All times are in Mountain time

== Roster ==
2022 Wyoming Cowboys football team roster
Players
Coaches
Offense

Pos.	#	Name	Class
RB	2	Titus Swen	Jr
WR	3	Gavin Beerup	Fr
WR	5	Jaylen Sargent	Fr
QB	6	Andrew Peasley	Jr
RB	7	D.Q. James	Fr
WR	8	Joshua Cobbs	So
WR	9	Alex Brown	So
WR	11	Wyatt Wieland	Jr
QB	12	Jayden Clemons	So
QB	13	Hank Gibbs	Fr
QB	15	Caden Becker	Fr
WR	16	Gunner Gentry	Jr
QB	17	Evan Svoboda	So
WR	18	Tyrese Grant	So
WR	19	Caleb Cooley	Jr
WR	20	Ryan Marquez	Jr
RB	21	Jeremy Hollingsworth	So
RB	22	Joey Braasch	Fr
WR	23	Caleb Merritt	Fr
WR	24	Charlie Coenen	Fr
WR	25	Mitchell Anderson	Fr
RB	26	L.J. Richardson	Fr
RB	28	Jordon Vaughn	Fr
WR	29	Isaac Sell	Fr
RB	30	Dawaiian McNeely	So
FB	32	Dalton Strouss	Fr
FB	35	Kimball Madsen	Fr
FB	36	Caleb Driskill	So
OT	50	Jack Lookabaugh	So
OL	54	Mykel Janise	Fr
OT	55	JJ Uphold	Fr
OL	57	Luke Sandy	Fr
C	60	Marco Machado	Jr
OL	62	Jagger Filippone	Fr
G	64	Kohl Herbolsheimer	So
G	65	Zach Watts	Jr
G	66	Ethan Shipp	Fr
G	68	Mason Schultz	So
OT/OG	69	Eric Abojei	Sr
OL	70	Rex Johnsen	Fr
OT	71	Carlos Harrison	So
OT	72	Caden Barnett	Fr
OT	73	Deshawn Woods	Fr
OT	74	Forrest Scheel	Fr
OT	75	Frank Crum	Jr
G	76	Emmanuel Prefnon	Fr
C	77	Nofoafia Tulafono	So
OL	78	Wes King	Fr
G	79	Jack Walsh	Fr
FB/TE	80	Parker Christensen	So
TE	81	Treyton Welch	Jr
TE	82	Jackson Marcotte	Jr
WR	83	Will Pelissier	So
TE	84	John Michael Gyllenborg	Fr
WR	85	Chase Locke	So
TE	86	Nick Miles	So
TE	87	Isaac Schoenfeld	Fr
TE	88	Colin O'Brien	Jr

Defense

Pos.	#	Name	Class
NB	2	Keonte Glinton	So
FS	3	Andrew Johnson	Fr
CB	4	Cam Stone	So
CB	5	Deron Harrell	Sr
CB	6	Kolbey Taylor	Fr
CB	7	Jakorey Hawkins	Jr
CB	11	Josh Dixon	Fr
NB	13	Zaire Jackson	Fr
SS	14	Miles Williams	Sr
S	15	TJ Urban	Fr
NB	19	Malique Singleton	Fr
S	21	Koa McIntyre	Fr
CB	22	Jovan Marsh	Fr
NB	23	Wrook Brown	Fr
LB	25	Cole DeMarzo	So
LB	28	Easton Gibbs	So
CB	29	Mathew Posas	So
NB	30	Buck Coors	Fr
FS	31	Wyett Ekeler	So
LB	32	Sam Scott	Fr
LB	33	Connor Shay	So
SS	34	Tommy Wroblewski	So
FS	37	Brenndan Warady	Fr
DE	40	Tyce Westland	Fr
LB	41	Nic Talich	Fr
SS	42	Isaac White	So
LB	43	Shae Suiaunoa	So
DE	44	Oluwaseyi Omotosho	Fr
LB	45	Read Sunn	Fr
LB	47	Brent VanderVeen	Fr
LB	49	Cayden Hawkins	Fr
LB	50	Tommy McEvoy	Fr
DE	54	Sabastian Harsh	So
DE	55	Kevin Sjogren	Fr
DE	57	Brady Bohlinger	Fr
LB	58	Michah Young	Fr
NT	63	Ben Florentine	Fr
DE	86	Braden Siders	Fr
DE	87	Akili Bonner	So
NT	90	Gavin Meyer	So
DT	91	Jaden Williams	Fr
DE	93	DeVonne Harris	So
NT	94	Cole Godbout	Jr
DT	95	Caleb Robinson	So
DT	96	Jordan Bertagnole	So
DT	97	Ethan Drewes	So
DE	99	Keelan Cox	So

Special teams

Pos.	#	Name	Class
P	27	Ralph Fawaz	So
P	39	Clayton Stewart	Jr
K	42	Luke Glassock	So
K	46	John Hoyland	So
LS	52	Carson York	Fr

Head coach

- Craig Bohl

Coordinators/assistant coaches

- Mike Grant – Associate head coach / passing game coordinator / wide receivers
- Tim Polasek – Offensive coordinator / quarterbacks
- Jay Sawvel – Defensive coordinator / safeties
- Aaron Bohl – Linebackers
- Benny Boyd – Co-special teams coordinator / cornerbacks
- Marty English – Defensive ends
- Oscar Giles – Defensive run game coordinator / defensive tackles
- Gordie Haug – Executive director of recruiting / running backs
- Shannon Moore – Co-special teams coordinator / tight ends / fullbacks
- Joe Tripodi – Offensive line

Legend

- (C) Team captain
- (S) Suspended
- (I) Ineligible
- Injured
- Redshirt

Roster
Last update: 7 December 2022

== Statistics ==
=== Team ===
	Wyoming	Opp
Scoring	249	281
Points per game	20.8	23.4
First downs	191	233
Rushing	105	104
Passing	72	112
Penalty	14	17
Rushing yards	2253	1794
Avg per play	5.1	4.2
Avg per game	187.8	149.5
Rushing touchdowns	14	16
Passing yards	1533	2637
Att-Comp-Int	274-138-11	399-241-6
Avg per pass	5.6	6.6
Avg per catch	11.1	10.9
Avg per game	127.8	219.8
Passing touchdowns	10	17
Total offense	3786	4431
Avg per play	5.3	5.4
Avg per game	315.5	369.3
Fumbles-Lost	10-4	14-7
Penalties-Yards	53-460	64-591
Avg per game	38.3	49.3

	Wyoming	Opp
Punts-Yards	68-3015	61-2696
Avg per punt	44.3	44.2
Time of possession/Game	29:06	30:54
3rd down conversions	54-159	66-175
4th down conversions	2-7	10-18
Touchdowns scored	27	34
Field goals-Attempts	20-23	13-25
PAT-Attempts	25-25	34-34

=== Individual leaders ===
==== Passing ====
Passing statistics
#	NAME	GP	RAT	CMP	ATT	YDS	AVG/G	CMP%	TD	INT	LONG
6	Andrew Peasley	11	104.6	126	245	1388	126.2	51.4%	9	8	51
12	Jayden Clemons	4	74.1	12	29	145	36.3	41.4%	1	3	32
	TOTALS	12	101.4	138	274	1533	127.8	50.4%	10	11	51

==== Rushing ====
Rushing statistics
#	NAME	GP	ATT	GAIN	AVG	TD	LONG	AVG/G
2	Titus Swen	12	207	1039	5.0	8	83	86.6
30	Dawaiian McNeely	10	63	356	5.7	1	61	35.6
7	D.Q. James	9	40	346	8.7	0	74	38.4
6	Andrew Peasley	11	70	330	4.7	2	61	30.0
22	Joseph Braasch	8	29	91	3.1	0	11	11.4
12	Jayden Clemons	4	13	58	4.5	1	14	14.5
83	Will Pelissier	9	6	38	6.3	0	18	4.2
11	Wyatt Wieland	12	6	19	3.2	2	9	1.6
20	Ryan Marquez	12	2	4	2.0	0	6	0.3
39	Clayton Stewart	12	1	-12	-12.0	0	0	-1.0
	Team	12	9	-16	-1.8	0	0	-1.3
	TOTALS	12	446	2253	5.1	14	83	187.8

==== Receiving ====
Receiving statistics
#	NAME	GP	CTH	YDS	AVG	TD	LONG	AVG/G
8	Joshua Cobbs	12	35	407	11.6	2	51	33.9
11	Wyatt Wieland	12	21	289	13.8	1	39	24.1
80	Parker Christensen	11	19	169	8.9	1	29	15.4
81	Treyton Welch	11	17	217	12.8	4	47	19.7
2	Titus Swen	12	14	108	7.7	0	43	9.0
83	Will Pelissier	9	8	101	12.6	1	48	11.2
7	D.Q. James	9	5	44	8.8	0	23	4.9
22	Joseph Braasch	8	4	25	6.3	0	8	3.1
88	Colin O'Brien	8	4	83	20.8	0	46	10.4
82	Jackson Marcotte	11	3	11	3.7	0	7	1.0
9	Alex Brown	11	3	41	13.7	1	32	3.7
84	John Michael Gyllenborg	11	3	21	7.0	0	10	1.9
20	Ryan Marquez	12	1	6	6.0	0	6	0.5
86	Nick Miles	10	1	11	11.0	0	11	1.1
	TOTALS	12	138	1533	11.1	10	51	127.8

==== Defense ====
Defense statistics
#	NAME	GP	SOLO	AST	TOT	TFL-YDS	SACK-YDS	INT	BU	QBH	FR	FF	BLK	SAF	TD
28	Easton Gibbs	12	58	53	111	8-24	2-3	0	1	4	1	0	0	0	0
43	Shae Suiaunoa	12	39	28	67	4.5-23	2.5-18	1	1	6	0	0	0	0	0
31	Wyett Ekeler	12	42	22	64	1-1	0-0	1	5	4	1	1	0	0	0
42	Isaac White	12	42	19	61	3-7	0.5-3	0	2	1	0	0	0	0	0
93	DeVonne Harris	12	27	23	50	13-54	8-40	0	1	6	1	0	0	0	0
96	Jordan Bertagnole	10	24	25	49	7.5-59	5.5-57	0	0	3	0	2	0	0	0
44	Oluwaseyi Omotosho	11	27	19	46	7.5-43	6.5-42	0	0	10	0	1	0	0	0
86	Braden Siders	12	29	8	38	10.5-35	5-16	0	1	7	0	0	0	0	0
90	Gavin Meyer	12	18	18	36	5-27	4-23	0	0	1	0	1	1	0	0
4	Cameron Stone	12	23	12	35	1-3	0-0	2	10	1	0	1	0	0	0
94	Cole Godbout	6	17	15	32	4.5-7	0-0	0	1	11	0	0	0	0	0
23	Wrook Brown	12	19	12	31	0.5-1	0-0	0	2	0	0	0	0	0	0
7	Jakorey Hawkins	11	21	7	28	0-0	0-0	1	8	0	0	0	0	0	0
2	Keonte Glinton	6	19	7	26	0-0	0-0	0	4	0	1	0	0	0	0
25	Cole DeMarzo	12	7	15	22	0.5-1	0-0	0	0	0	0	0	0	0	0
14	Miles Williams	12	13	5	18	0-0	0-0	0	2	0	1	1	0	0	0
5	Deron Harrell	11	11	6	17	0-0	0-0	1	2	0	1	0	0	0	0
95	Caleb Robinson	12	7	7	14	0-0	0-0	0	0	0	0	0	0	0	0
45	Read Sunn	12	3	5	8	0.5-0	0-0	0	0	0	0	0	0	0	0
36	Caleb Driskill	12	4	2	6	0-0	0-0	0	0	0	0	1	0	0	0
20	Ryan Marquez	12	5	1	6	0-0	0-0	0	0	0	0	0	1	0	0
29	Matt Posas	11	3	1	4	0-0	0-0	0	0	0	0	0	0	0	0
11	Wyatt Wieland	12	4	0	4	0-0	0-0	0	0	0	0	0	0	0	0
22	Joseph Braasch	8	2	1	3	0-0	0-0	0	0	0	0	0	0	0	0
80	Parker Christensen	11	3	0	3	0-0	0-0	0	0	0	0	0	0	0	0
33	Connor Shay	11	0	3	3	0-0	0-0	0	0	0	0	0	0	0	0
84	John Michael Gyllenborg	11	1	2	3	0-0	0-0	0	0	0	0	0	0	0	0
76	Emmanuel Pregnon	10	2	0	2	0-0	0-0	0	0	0	0	0	0	0	0
6	Kolbey Taylor	8	2	0	2	0-0	0-0	0	0	0	0	0	0	0	0
32	Sam Scott	11	1	1	2	0-0	0-0	0	0	0	0	0	0	0	0
58	Micah Young	10	2	0	2	0-0	0-0	0	0	0	0	0	0	0	0
83	Will Pelissier	9	2	0	2	0-0	0-0	0	0	0	0	0	0	0	0
8	Buck Coors	3	1	1	2	0-0	0-0	0	0	0	0	0	0	0	0
8	Joshua Cobbs	12	2	0	2	0-0	0-0	0	0	0	0	0	0	0	0
91	Jaden Williams	2	0	1	1	0-0	0-0	0	0	1	0	0	0	0	0
22	Jovan Marsh	2	1	0	1	0-0	0-0	0	0	0	0	0	0	0	0
63	Ben Florentine	2	1	0	1	0-0	0-0	0	0	0	0	0	0	0	0
72	Caden Barnett	11	1	0	1	0-0	0-0	0	0	0	0	0	0	0	0
46	John Hoyland	12	1	0	1	0-0	0-0	0	0	0	0	0	0	0	0
88	Colin O'Brien	8	0	0	0	0-0	0-0	0	0	1	0	0	0	0	0
52	Carson York	12	0	0	0	0-0	0-0	0	0	0	1	0	0	0	0
	TOTALS	12	487	320	807	67-285	34-202	6	40	56	7	8	2	0	0

Key: POS: Position, SOLO: Solo Tackles, AST: Assisted Tackles, TOT: Total Tackles, TFL: Tackles-for-loss, SACK: Quarterback Sacks, INT: Interceptions, BU: Passes Broken Up, PD: Passes Defended, QBH: Quarterback Hits, FR: Fumbles Recovered, FF: Forced Fumbles, BLK: Kicks or Punts Blocked, SAF: Safeties, TD : Touchdown

==== Special teams ====
Kicking statistics
#	NAME	GP	XPM	XPA	XP%	FGM	FGA	FG%	1–19	20–29	30–39	40–49	50+	LNG
46	John Hoyland	12	25	25	100.0%	20	23	87.0%	1-1	7-7	5-6	4-5	3-4	55

Kickoff statistics
#	NAME	GP	KICKS	YDS	AVG	TB	OB
46	John Hoyland	12	58	3656	63.0	27	2

Punting statistics
#	NAME	GP	PUNTS	YDS	AVG	LONG	TB	I–20	50+	BLK
39	Clayton Stewart	12	66	2902	44.0	67	9	19	17	0
	Team	12	2	113	56.5	0	0	0	0	2
	TOTALS	12	68	3015	44.3	67	9	20	17	2

Kick return statistics
#	NAME	GP	RTNS	YDS	AVG	TD	LNG
4	Cameron Stone	12	7	154	22.0	0	37
11	Wyatt Wieland	12	4	94	23.5	0	29
58	Micah Young	10	1	10	10.0	0	10
	TOTALS	12	12	258	21.5	0	37

Punt return statistics
#	NAME	GP	RTNS	YDS	AVG	TD	LONG
19	Caleb Cooley	12	2	10	5.0	0	10
11	Wyatt Wieland	12	2	0	0.0	0	0
4	Cameron Stone	12	1	1	1.0	0	1
	TOTALS	12	5	20	4.0	0	10
