= 2022 New Mexico Lobos football team =

American college football season

2022 New Mexico Lobos football
- Conference: Mountain West Conference
- Mountain Division
- Record: 2–10 (0–8 MW)
- Head coach: Danny Gonzales (3rd season)
- Offensive coordinator: Derek Warehime (3rd season)
- Offensive scheme: No-huddle spread option
- Defensive coordinator: Rocky Long (3rd season)
- Base defense: 3–3–5
- Home stadium: University Stadium

Uniform
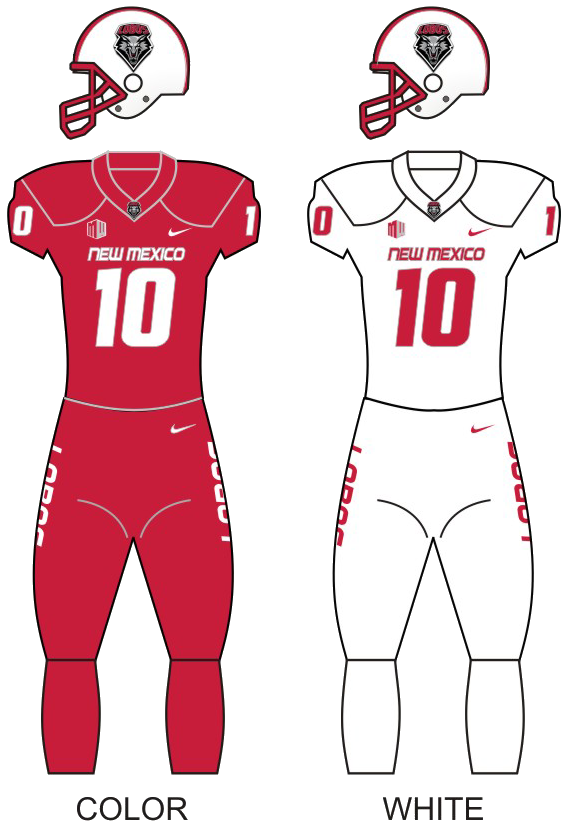

2022 Mountain West Conference football standings
	Conf.			Overall
Team	W		L	W		L
Mountain Division
Boise State xy	8	–	0	10	–	4
Air Force	5	–	3	10	–	3
Wyoming	5	–	3	7	–	6
Utah State	5	–	3	6	–	7
Colorado State	3	–	5	3	–	9
New Mexico	0	–	8	2	–	10
West Division
No. 24 Fresno State xy$	7	–	1	10	–	4
San Diego State	5	–	3	7	–	6
San Jose State	5	–	3	7	–	5
UNLV	3	–	5	5	–	7
Hawaii	2	–	6	3	–	10
Nevada	0	–	8	2	–	10
Championship: Fresno State 28, Boise State 16
$ – Conference champion; x – Division champion/co-champions; y – Championship game participant; Rankings from AP Poll

The 2022 New Mexico Lobos football team represented the University of New Mexico as a member of the Mountain Division in the Mountain West Conference (MW) during the 2022 NCAA Division I FBS football season. Led by third-year head coach Danny Gonzales, the Lobos compiled an overall record of 2–10 with a mark of 0–8 in conference play, placing last out of six teams in the MW's Mountain Division. The team played home games at University Stadium in Albuquerque, New Mexico.

== Schedule ==
New Mexico and the Mountain West Conference announced the 2022 football schedule on February 16, 2022.

Date	Time	Opponent	Site	TV	Result	Attendance
September 3	6:00 p.m.	Maine*	University Stadium; Albuquerque, NM	KASY	W 41–0	15,166
September 9	7:00 p.m.	Boise State	University Stadium; Albuquerque, NM	CBSSN	L 14–31	16,127
September 17	6:00 p.m.	UTEP*	University Stadium; Albuquerque, NM	KASY	W 27–10	15,269
September 24	5:30 p.m.	at LSU*	Tiger Stadium; Baton Rouge, LA	ESPN+, SECN+	L 0–38	100,501
September 30	9:00 p.m.	at UNLV	Allegiant Stadium; Paradise, NV	CBSSN	L 20–31	21,605
October 8	5:00 p.m.	Wyoming	University Stadium; Albuquerque, NM	CBSSN	L 14–27	14,226
October 15	6:00 p.m.	at New Mexico State*	Aggie Memorial Stadium; Las Cruces, NM (Rio Grande Rivalry)	FloSports	L 9–21	20,132
October 22	4:30 p.m.	Fresno State^{†}	University Stadium; Albuquerque, NM	FS2	L 9–41	14,667
November 5	1:30 p.m.	at Utah State	Maverik Stadium; Logan, UT	CBSSN	L 10–27	14,154
November 12	1:30 p.m.	at Air Force	Falcon Stadium; Colorado Springs, CO	CBSSN	L 3–35	20,827
November 18	7:45 p.m.	San Diego State	University Stadium; Albuquerque, NM	FS1	L 10–34	14,309
November 25	1:30 p.m.	at Colorado State	Canvas Stadium; Fort Collins, CO	CBSSN	L 0–17	20,107
*Non-conference game; ^{†}Homecoming; All times are in Mountain time
