= 2022 San Jose State Spartans football team =

American college football season

2022 San Jose State Spartans football

Famous Idaho Potato Bowl, L 27–41 vs. Eastern Michigan
- Conference: Mountain West Conference
- West Division
- Record: 7–5 (5–3 MW)
- Head coach: Brent Brennan (6th season)
- Offensive coordinator: Kevin McGiven (5th season)
- Offensive scheme: Spread option
- Defensive coordinator: Derrick Odum (6th season)
- Base defense: 3–4
- Home stadium: CEFCU Stadium

2022 Mountain West Conference football standings
	Conf.			Overall
Team	W		L	W		L
Mountain Division
Boise State xy	8	–	0	10	–	4
Air Force	5	–	3	10	–	3
Wyoming	5	–	3	7	–	6
Utah State	5	–	3	6	–	7
Colorado State	3	–	5	3	–	9
New Mexico	0	–	8	2	–	10
West Division
No. 24 Fresno State xy$	7	–	1	10	–	4
San Diego State	5	–	3	7	–	6
San Jose State	5	–	3	7	–	5
UNLV	3	–	5	5	–	7
Hawaii	2	–	6	3	–	10
Nevada	0	–	8	2	–	10
Championship: Fresno State 28, Boise State 16
$ – Conference champion; x – Division champion/co-champions; y – Championship game participant; Rankings from AP Poll

The 2022 San Jose State Spartans football team represented San Jose State University as a member of the Mountain West Conference during the 2022 NCAA Division I FBS football season. They were led by head coach Brent Brennan, who was coaching his sixth season with the program. The Spartans played their home games at CEFCU Stadium in San Jose, California.

On October 21, San Jose State freshman running back Camdan McWright was struck by a school bus, sustaining fatal injuries. The following day's game between the Spartans and the New Mexico State Aggies was postponed to allow San Jose State players time to grieve before the game was outright canceled.

== Schedule ==
San Jose State and the Mountain West Conference announced the 2022 football schedule on February 16, 2022.

Date	Time	Opponent	Site	TV	Result	Attendance
September 1	7:30 p.m.	Portland State*	CEFCU Stadium; San Jose, CA	NBCSBA	W 21–17	16,291
September 10	4:30 p.m.	at Auburn*	Jordan–Hare Stadium; Auburn, AL	ESPNU	L 16–24	83,340
September 24	7:30 p.m.	Western Michigan*	CEFCU Stadium; San Jose, CA	CBSSN	W 34–6	17,058
October 1	4:30 p.m.	at Wyoming	War Memorial Stadium; Laramie, WY	CBSSN	W 33–16	17,765
October 7	7:30 p.m.	UNLV	CEFCU Stadium; San Jose, CA	CBSSN	W 40–7	16,669
October 15	7:45 p.m.	at Fresno State	Bulldog Stadium; Fresno, CA (rivalry)	FS2	L 10–17	41,031
October 22	3:00 p.m.	at New Mexico State*	Aggie Memorial Stadium; Las Cruces, NM	FloSports	Canceled	
October 29	7:30 p.m.	Nevada	CEFCU Stadium; San Jose, CA	CBSSN	W 35–28	17,117
November 5	7:30 p.m.	Colorado State	CEFCU Stadium; San Jose, CA	NBCSBA	W 28–16	16,382
November 12	7:30 p.m.	at San Diego State	Snapdragon Stadium; San Diego, CA	FS1	L 27–43	28,406
November 19	6:45 p.m.	at Utah State	Maverik Stadium; Logan, UT	FS1	L 31–35	13,677
November 26	12:30 p.m.	Hawaii	CEFCU Stadium; San Jose, CA (Dick Tomey Legacy Game)	SPEC PPV	W 27–14	15,012
December 20	12:30 p.m.	vs. Eastern Michigan*	Albertsons Stadium; Boise, ID (Famous Idaho Potato Bowl)	ESPN	L 27–41	10,122
*Non-conference game; All times are in Pacific time

== Roster ==
2022 San Jose State Spartans football team roster
Players
Coaches
Offense

Pos.	#	Name	Class
WR	1	Kejuan Bullard Jr.	Fr
QB	2	Chevan Cordeiro	Jr
WR	3	Nick Nash	Sr
WR	4	Elijah Cooks	GS
QB	5	Walker Eget	So
RB	6	Camdan McWright	Fr
WR	7	Charles Ross	So
RB	8	Jakob Galloway	Fr
WR	9	Isaiah Hamilton	Sr
QB	10	Tyler Voss	Fr
WR	11	Justin Lockhart	So
WR	12	Malikhi Miller	So
WR	13	Jermaine Braddock	Sr
WR	14	Matthew Coleman	Fr
WR	15	Nicholas Williams	Fr
WR	17	Cieonta Davis	Fr
WR	18	Trevor Voss	Fr
RB	20	Jabari Bates	Fr
RB	22	Kenyon Sims	Jr
RB	24	Shamar Garrett	Jr
RB	31	Kayden Collins	Fr
RB	32	Kairee Robinson	Sr
RB	36	Ian Jernagin	Fr
OT	54	Jaime Navarro	Sr
OL	55	James McNorton	Fr
OL	60	Hudson Mesa	So
OL	61	Marist Talavou	So
OL	64	Gavyn Tobin	So
OL	65	Denaris DeRosa Jr.	Fr
OL	67	Kai Davison	Fr
OL	68	Ryan Stewart	Fr
OL	69	Uluakinofo Taliauli	Fr
OL	70	Malik Williams	So
OL	71	Tyler Ostrom	Sr
OL	72	Jelani Newman	Jr
OL	74	Anthony Pardue	Sr
OL	75	Joseph Harbert	Fr
OL	76	Dawson Brown	So
OL	78	Jake Steele	Fr
OL	79	Fernando Carmona Jr.	Fr
WR	80	Makai Smith	Fr
TE	81	Dominick Mazotti	Jr
WR	82	Terence Loville	So
WR	83	Branden Alvarez	Fr
TE	84	Joshua Scott	Fr
TE	85	Jackson Canaan	So
TE	86	Skylar Loving-Black	Jr
TE	88	Sam Olson	Jr
TE	89	Nate Lewis	So

Defense

Pos.	#	Name	Class
CB, WR	0	Isaac Jernagin	So
DB	1	Chase Williams	Jr
LB	2	Dion Leonard	GS
DL	3	Tre Smith	So
DL	4	Noah Wright	GS
S	5	Jaylan Lawson	Jr
LB	6	Bryun Parham	So
CB	7	Kenyon Reed	Jr
LB	8	Alii Matau	GS
LB	10	Jordan Pollard	Fr
CB	11	Ryan Nixon	Sr
LB	12	Rahyme Johnson	GS
LB	13	Justin Stearns	Fr
LB	14	Elijah Wood	Fr
CB	15	Jalen Bainer	So
LB	16	Rico Tolefree	Sr
CB	17	Zavion Reese	So
LB	18	Damonie Perkins	Fr
S	19	B.J. Johnson	Jr
DB	20	Tre White	GS
CB	21	Mikale Greer	So
S	22	Tre Jenkins	Sr
CB	23	Nehemiah Shelton	GS
DB	25	Michael Dansby	Fr
LB	26	Ethan Powell	Fr
S	27	Andrew Jenkins	Sr
LB	28	Jordan Allen	So
DB	29	Jalen Apalit-Williams	Fr
DB	30	Assani Berkeley	Fr
DL	31	Noah Lavulo	Jr
CB	33	CJ Jones	Fr
LB	33	Matthew Tago	Sr
S	34	Giovanni Harper	So
LB	35	Charles Rogers	Jr
CB	37	Caleb Womack	Fr
DB	38	Elisha Guidry	Jr
CB	39	Kavon Baptiste	So
LB	40	Justin Eklund	Fr
DL	42	Viliami Fehoko	Jr
LB	44	Jordan Cobbs	Sr
LB	45	Kyle Harmon	GS
DL	48	Dejon Roney	Fr
LB	55	Anthony Madrigal	So
DL	56	Jairus Satele	Fr
DL	63	Gabriel Aguilar-Pinon	Fr
DL	78	Soane Toia	Jr
DL	90	Lando Grey	GS
DL	91	Natano Woods	Fr
DL	92	Cade Hall	GS
DL	95	Tim Foster	Fr
DL	96	Jay Kakiva	GS
DL	97	John Norwood	Fr
DL	98	Grady Manley	So
DL	99	Marcel Sanders	So

Special teams

Pos.	#	Name	Class
P	28	Travis Benham	Sr
K	39	Dino Beslagic	Fr
PK	49	Taren Schive	So
LS	51	Andrew Gonneville	Sr
LS	59	Davis Salom	So
P	99	Alex Weir	So

Head coach

- Brent Brennan

Coordinators/assistant coaches

- Ben Thienes – Assistant athletics director for football operations
- Derrick Odum – Associate head coach/defensive coordinator
- Kevin McGiven – Offensive coordinator/quarterbacks
- Matt Adkins – Tight ends
- Alonzo Carter – Assistant head coach/running backs/recruiting coordinator
- Rob Christoff – Outside linebackers
- Josh Oglesby – Offensive line
- Eric Scott – Wide receivers/passing game coordinator
- Joe Seumalo – Defensive line
- Chip Viney – Cornerbacks
- Scott White – Linebackers/special teams coordinator
- Garrett Sandow – Graduate assistant - offense
- Reis Seggebruch – Graduate assistant - defense
- Cedric Lousi – Graduate assistant - defense
- Terry Malley – Analyst
- Fred Guidici – Analyst - special teams
- Lyle Moevao – Analyst - offense
- Tobruk Blaine – Assistant athletics director for student-athlete development/beyond football coordinator
- Johnathon Hankinson – Director of football equipment
- Tanner Schultheis – Director of football operations
- Fletcher Kelly – Director of player personnel
- Aaron Potoshnik – Director of football athletic performance

Legend

- (C) Team captain
- (S) Suspended
- (I) Ineligible
- Injured
- Redshirt

Roster
Last update: June 22, 2023

== Awards and honors ==
=== Mountain West individual awards ===
The following individuals received postseason awards and honors as voted by the Mountain West Conference football coaches at the end of the season.

Award	Player	Position
Defensive Player of the Year	Viliami Fehoko	DL

=== All-conference teams ===
The following players were selected as part of the Mountain West's All-Conference Teams.

Position	Player
First Team Offense
WR	Elijah Cooks
First Team Defense
DL	Viliami Fehoko
DL	Cade Hall
LB	Kyle Harmon
Second Team Offense
QB	Chevan Cordeiro

== Rankings ==
On October 9, San Jose State received votes in the AP Poll and Coaches Poll for the first time since the 2020 postseason.

Ranking movements Legend: ██ Increase in ranking ██ Decrease in ranking — = Not ranked RV = Received votes
	Week															
Poll	Pre	1	2	3	4	5	6	7	8	9	10	11	12	13	14	Final
AP	—	—	—	—	—	—	—	RV	—	—	—	—	—	—	—	—
Coaches	—	—	—	—	—	—	—	RV	—	—	—	—	—	—	—	—
CFP	Not released									—	—	—	—	—	—	Not released
