= 2022 Mountain West Conference football season =

- League: NCAA Division I FBS
- Sport: Football
- Duration: August 27, 2022 – December 3, 2022
- Teams: 12
- TV partner(s): CBS Sports Family (CBS, CBSSN) Fox Sports Family (Fox, FS1, FS2)

2023 NFL draft
- Top draft pick: QB Jake Haener, Fresno State
- Picked by: New Orleans Saints, 127th overall

Regular season
- Mountain Division champions: Boise State
- West Division champions: Fresno State

Championship Game
- Champions: Fresno State
- Runners-up: Boise State

Seasons
- 2021 2023

2022 Mountain West Conference football standings
	Conf.			Overall
Team	W		L	W		L
Mountain Division
Boise State xy	8	–	0	10	–	4
Air Force	5	–	3	10	–	3
Wyoming	5	–	3	7	–	6
Utah State	5	–	3	6	–	7
Colorado State	3	–	5	3	–	9
New Mexico	0	–	8	2	–	10
West Division
No. 24 Fresno State xy$	7	–	1	10	–	4
San Diego State	5	–	3	7	–	6
San Jose State	5	–	3	7	–	5
UNLV	3	–	5	5	–	7
Hawaii	2	–	6	3	–	10
Nevada	0	–	8	2	–	10
Championship: Fresno State 28, Boise State 16
$ – Conference champion; x – Division champion/co-champions; y – Championship game participant; Rankings from AP Poll

The 2022 Mountain West Conference football season was the 24th season of College football for the Mountain West Conference. It was part of the 2022 NCAA Division I FBS football season. 12 teams competed in the conference during the season. The season began August 27 and concluded on December 3 with the Mountain West Conference Football Championship Game. The full schedule for the season was released on February 16, 2022

== Preseason ==
=== Mountain West Media ===
The Mountain West Media days was held at the Mandalay Bay Las Vegas on July 20 and 21.

=== Preseason Poll ===
The Preseason Media Poll was released July 20, 2022. Boise State was picked to win the Mountain division, while Fresno State was picked to win the West division.

Mountain
Predicted finish	Team	Votes (for first)
1	Boise State	151 (14)
2	Air Force	136 (10)
3	Utah State	122 (3)
4	Colorado State	90 (1)
5	Wyoming	60
6	New Mexico	29

West
Predicted finish	Team	Votes (for first)
1	Fresno State	160 (20)
2	San Diego State	148 (8)
3	San Jose State	105
4	Nevada	66
5	UNLV	58
6	Hawaii	51

=== Preseason All-Conference Team ===
The Preseason All-Conference Team was announced only July 21, 2022.

- Offensive Player of the Year: Jake Haener (Senior, Fresno State quarterback)
- Defensive Players of the Year: Cade Hall (Senior, San Jose State defensive lineman) & Patrick McMorris (Senior, San Diego State defensive back)
- Special Teams Player of the Year: Jordan Byrd (Senior, San Diego State punt and kick returner)

Position	Player	Team
Offense
QB	Jake Haener	Fresno State
WR	Jalen Cropper	Fresno State
WR	Jesse Matthews	San Diego State
RB	Brad Roberts	Air Force
RB	Jordan Mims	Fresno State
OL	Isaac Cochran	Air Force
OL	John Ojukwu	Boise State
OL	Dontae Bull	Fresno State
OL	Aaron Frost	Nevada
OL	Alama Uluave	San Diego State
TE	Tanner Arkin	Colorado State
Defense
DL	Scott Matlock	Boise State
DL	Keshawn Banks	San Diego State
DL	Jonah Tavai	San Diego State
DL	Viliami Fehoko	San Jose State
DL	Cade Hall	San Jose State
LB	Vince Sanford	Air Force
LB	Caden McDonald	San Diego State
LB	Kyle Harmon	San Jose State
DB	JL Skinner	Boise State
DB	Evan Williams	Fresno State
DB	Jerrick Reed II	New Mexico
DB	Patrick McMorris	San Diego State
Special Teams
P	Aaron Rodriguez	New Mexico
PK	Jonah Dalmas	Boise State
PR	Jordan Byrd	San Diego State
KR	Jordan Byrd	San Diego State

=== Preseason individual awards ===
The following list contains Mountain West players who were included on preseason watch lists for national awards.

Award	Head Coach/Player	School	Position	Ref
Lott Trophy	none			
Dodd Trophy	none			
Maxwell Award	Brad Roberts	Air Force	RB	
Maxwell Award	George Holani	Boise State	RB	
Maxwell Award	Jake Haener	Fresno State	QB	
Maxwell Award	Logan Bonner	Utah State	QB	
Davey O'Brien Award	Logan Bonner	Utah State	QB	
Davey O'Brien Award	Jake Haener	Fresno State	QB	
Doak Walker Award	George Holani	Boise State	RB	
Doak Walker Award	Jordan Mims	Fresno State	RB	
Doak Walker Award	Titus Swen	Wyoming	RB	
Doak Walker Award	Calvin Tyler Jr.	Utah State	RB	
Biletnikoff Award	Jalen Cropper	Fresno State	WR	
John Mackey Award	Mark Redman	San Diego State	TE	
John Mackey Award	Sam Olson	San Jose State	TE	
Rimington Trophy	Alama Uluave	San Diego State	C	
Butkus Award	Kyle Harmon	San Jose State	LB	
Jim Thorpe Award	JL Skinner	Boise State	S	
Jim Thorpe Award	Evan Williams	Fresno State	S	

Award	Head Coach/Player	School	Position	Ref
Bronko Nagurski Trophy	Viliami Fehoko	San Jose State	DE	
Bronko Nagurski Trophy	Kyle Harmon	San Jose State	LB	
Bronko Nagurski Trophy	Caden McDonald	San Diego State	LB	
Bronko Nagurski Trophy	Patrick McMorris	San Diego State	S	
Bronko Nagurski Trophy	Vince Sanford	Air Force	LB	
Bronko Nagurski Trophy	JL Skinner	Boise State	S	
Bronko Nagurski Trophy	Evan Williams	Fresno State	S	
Outland Trophy	Alfred Edwards	Utah State	OT	
Outland Trophy	Aaron Frost	Nevada	OT	
Outland Trophy	Scott Matlock	Boise State	DT	
Outland Trophy	John Ojukwu	Boise State	OT	
Outland Trophy	Everett Smalley	Air Force	OT	
Outland Trophy	Alama Uluave	San Diego State	C	
Lou Groza Award	Cayden Camper	Colorado State	K	
Lou Groza Award	Jonah Dalmas	Boise State	K	
Lou Groza Award	Daniel Gutierrez	UNLV	K	
Lou Groza Award	Matthew Shipley	Hawaii	K	
Lou Groza Award	Brandon Talton	Nevada	K	
Ray Guy Award	Aaron Rodriguez	New Mexico	P	
Ray Guy Award	Stephen Kotsanlee	Utah State	P	
Paul Hornung Award	Jordan Byrd	San Diego State	RB	
Paul Hornung Award	Stefan Cobbs	Boise State	WR	
Paul Hornung Award	Nikko Remigio	Fresno State	WR	
Paul Hornung Award	Titus Swen	Wyoming	RB	
Paul Hornung Award	Luke Wysong	New Mexico	WR	
Wuerffel Trophy	John Ojukwu	Boise State	OT	
Wuerffel Trophy	A'Jon Vivens	Colorado State	RB	
Wuerffel Trophy	Jalen Cropper	Fresno State	WR	
Wuerffel Trophy	Jonah Kalahawai-Welch	Hawaii	DL	
Wuerffel Trophy	Christian Swint	Nevada	CB	
Wuerffel Trophy	Luke Wysong	New Mexico	WR	
Wuerffel Trophy	Michael Shawcroft	San Diego State	LB	
Wuerffel Trophy	Chevan Cordeiro	San Jose State	QB	
Wuerffel Trophy	Andre Grayson	Utah State	CB	

Award	Head Coach/Player	School	Position	Ref
Walter Camp Award	Jake Haener	Fresno State	QB	
Walter Camp Award	Brad Roberts	Air Force	RB	
Bednarik Award	Vince Sanford	Air Force	LB	
Bednarik Award	Scott Matlock	Boise State	DT	
Bednarik Award	Dequan Jackson	Colorado State	LB	
Bednarik Award	Evan Williams	Fresno State	S	
Bednarik Award	Dom Peterson	Nevada	DT	
Bednarik Award	Patrick McMorris	San Diego State	S	
Bednarik Award	Viliami Fehoko	San Jose State	DE	
Rotary Lombardi Award	Viliami Fehoko	San Jose State	DE	
Rotary Lombardi Award	Caden McDonald	San Diego State	LB	
Rotary Lombardi Award	David Perales	Fresno State	DE	
Patrick Mannelly Award	Rex Goossen	UNLV	LS	
Earl Campbell Tyler Rose Award	Logan Bonner	Utah State	QB	
Earl Campbell Tyler Rose Award	Trace Bruckler	New Mexico	TE	
Earl Campbell Tyler Rose Award	Stefan Cobbs	Boise State	WR	
Earl Campbell Tyler Rose Award	Tyrell Shavers	San Diego State	WR	
Earl Campbell Tyler Rose Award	Titus Swen	Wyoming	RB	
Earl Campbell Tyler Rose Award	Calvin Tyler Jr.	Utah State	RB	
Manning Award	Logan Bonner	Utah State	QB	
Manning Award	Jake Haener	Fresno State	QB	
Polynesian College Football Player Of The Year Award	Falepule Alo	Utah State	OL	
Polynesian College Football Player Of The Year Award	Chevan Cordeiro	San Jose State	QB	
Polynesian College Football Player Of The Year Award	Leif Fautanu	UNLV	OL	
Polynesian College Football Player Of The Year Award	Viliami Fehoko	San Jose State	DL	
Polynesian College Football Player Of The Year Award	George Holani	Boise State	RB	
Polynesian College Football Player Of The Year Award	Kekeaniokoa Holomalia-Gonzalez	Boise State	OL	
Polynesian College Football Player Of The Year Award	Jonah Kahahawai-Welch	Hawaii	DL	
Polynesian College Football Player Of The Year Award	Alii Matau	San Jose State	LB	
Polynesian College Football Player Of The Year Award	Hale Motu'apuaka	Utah State	DL	
Polynesian College Football Player Of The Year Award	Ezekiel Noa	Boise State	LB	
Polynesian College Football Player Of The Year Award	Jonah Panoke	Hawaii	WR	
Polynesian College Football Player Of The Year Award	Blessman Ta'ala	Hawaii	DL	
Polynesian College Football Player Of The Year Award	Toa Taua	Nevada	RB	
Polynesian College Football Player Of The Year Award	Jonah Tavai	San Diego State	DL	
Polynesian College Football Player Of The Year Award	Justus Tavai	San Diego State	DL	
Polynesian College Football Player Of The Year Award	Alama Uluave	San Diego State	OL	
Polynesian College Football Player Of The Year Award	Solo Vaipulu	Hawaii	OL	
Johnny Unitas Golden Arm Award	Hank Bachmeier	Boise State	QB	
Johnny Unitas Golden Arm Award	Logan Bonner	Utah State	QB	
Johnny Unitas Golden Arm Award	Braxton Burmeister	San Diego State	QB	
Johnny Unitas Golden Arm Award	Jake Haener	Fresno State	QB	
Ted Hendricks Award				

== Coaches ==
=== Coaching changes ===
- On December 2, 2021 Colorado State announced that they had fired head coach Steve Addazio after two seasons. Jay Norvell, who had been at Nevada, was hired to take the position at Colorado State.
- On December 8, 2021, Fresno State announced that Jeff Tedford would rejoin the school as head coach to replace the departing Kalen DeBoer. Teford had previously been head coach at Fresno State from 2017–2019, but had left the school after 2019 due to health issues.
- On December 10, 2021, Nevada announced that Oregon defensive coordinator Ken Wilson would replace Jay Norvell as head coach. Wilson had been an assistant coach in various positions for Nevada from 1989–2012 prior to being hired as head coach.
- On January 14, Hawaii head coach Todd Graham resigned from his position amid controversy surrounding mistreatment of players. On January 22, Hawaii announced Nevada assistant coach Timmy Chang as the new head coach.

=== Head coaches ===
Team	Head coach	Years at school	Overall record	Record at school	MW record
Air Force	Troy Calhoun	16	111–75	111–75	67–48
Boise State	Andy Avalos	2	7–5	7–5	5–3
Colorado State	Jay Norvell	1	33–26	0–0	23–17
Fresno State	Jeff Tedford	4	108–71	26–14	16–8
Hawaii	Timmy Chang	1	0–0	0–0	0–0
Nevada	Ken Wilson	1	0–0	0–0	0–0
New Mexico	Danny Gonzales	3	5–14	5–14	3–12
San Diego State	Brady Hoke	5	94–78	29–18	18–12
San Jose State	Brent Brennan	6	20–37	20–37	14–25
UNLV	Marcus Arroyo	3	2–16	2–16	2–12
Utah State	Blake Anderson	2	62–40	11–3	6–2
Wyoming	Craig Bohl	9	149–82	45–50	27–35

=== Post-season changes ===
- On November 28, UNLV announced that they had fired head coach Marcus Arroyo. Arroyo posted a 7–23 record with the school over three years. UNLV announced on December 6 that former Missouri head coach Barry Odom would become the new head coach for the 2023 season.

== Rankings ==
		Pre	Wk 1	Wk 2	Wk 3	Wk 4	Wk 5	Wk 6	Wk 7	Wk 8	Wk 9	Wk 10	Wk 11	Wk 12	Wk 13	Wk 14	Final
Air Force	AP	RV	RV	RV													RV
Air Force	C	RV	RV	RV	RV	RV	RV						RV	RV	RV	RV	RV
Air Force	CFP	Not released															
Boise State	AP	RV									RV		RV	RV	RV	RV	RV
Boise State	C	RV								RV	RV	RV	RV	RV	RV	RV	RV
Boise State	CFP	Not released															
Colorado State	AP																
Colorado State	C																
Colorado State	CFP	Not released															
Fresno State	AP	RV	RV											RV	RV	RV	24
Fresno State	C	RV	RV												RV	RV	24
Fresno State	CFP	Not released															
Hawaii	AP																
Hawaii	C																
Hawaii	CFP	Not released															
Nevada	AP																
Nevada	C																
Nevada	CFP	Not released															
New Mexico	AP																
New Mexico	C																
New Mexico	CFP	Not released															
San Diego State	AP	RV															
San Diego State	C	RV															
San Diego State	CFP	Not released															
San Jose State	AP							RV				RV					
San Jose State	C							RV									
San Jose State	CFP	Not released															
UNLV	AP																
UNLV	C																
UNLV	CFP	Not released															
Utah State	AP	RV															
Utah State	C	RV	RV														
Utah State	CFP	Not released															
Wyoming	AP																
Wyoming	C																
Wyoming	CFP	Not released															

Legend
	Improvement in ranking
	Drop in ranking
	Not ranked previous week
	No change in ranking from previous week
RV	Received votes but were not ranked in Top 25 of poll
т	Tied with team above or below also with this symbol

== Schedule ==
The schedule for the 2022 Mountain West football season was announced on February 16, 2022.

Index to colors and formatting
MW member won
MW member lost
MW teams in **bold**

All times Mountain time.

=== Week 0 ===
Date	Time	Visiting team	Home team	Site	TV	Result	Attendance	Ref.
August 27	1:30 p.m.	Idaho State	**UNLV**	Allegiant Stadium • Paradise, NV	CBSSN	**W** 52–21	19,579	
August 27	2:00 p.m.	UConn	**Utah State**	Maverik Stadium • Logan, UT	FS1	**W** 31–20	19,553	
August 27	2:00 p.m.	**Wyoming**	Illinois	Memorial Stadium • Champaign, IL	BTN	**L** 6–38	37,832	
August 27	8:00 p.m.	**Nevada**	New Mexico State	Aggie Memorial Stadium • Las Cruces, NM	ESPN2	**W** 23–12	23,371	
August 27	8:30 p.m.	Vanderbilt	**Hawaii**	Clarence T. C. Ching Athletics Complex • Honolulu, HI	CBSSN	**L** 10–63	9,346	
^{#}Rankings from AP Poll released prior to game. All times are in Mountain Time.

=== Week 1 ===
Date	Time	Visiting team	Home team	Site	TV	Result	Attendance	Ref.
September 1	6:30 p.m.	Portland State	**San Jose State**	CEFCU Stadium • San Jose, CA	NBCSBA	**W** 21–17	16,291	
September 1	6:30 p.m.	Cal Poly	**Fresno State**	Bulldog Stadium • Fresno, CA	FS1	**W** 35–7	36,011	
September 3	10:00 a.m.	**Colorado State**	No. 8 Michigan	Michigan Stadium • Ann Arbor, MI	ABC	**L** 7–51	109,575	
September 3	11:00 a.m.	No. 21 (FCS) Northern Iowa	**Air Force**	Falcon Stadium • Colorado Springs, CO	Altitude	**W** 48–17	31,180	
September 3	1:30 p.m.	Arizona	**San Diego State**	Snapdragon Stadium • San Diego, CA	CBS	**L** 20–38	34,046	
September 3	1:30 p.m.	Tulsa	**Wyoming**	War Memorial Stadium • Laramie, WY	FS1	**W** 40–37 ^{2OT}	20,574	
September 3	3:30 p.m.	Texas State	**Nevada**	Mackay Stadium • Reno, NV	NSN	**W** 38–14	13,260	
September 3	5:30 p.m.	**Utah State**	No. 1 Alabama	Bryant–Denny Stadium • Tuscaloosa, AL	SECN	**L** 0–55	98,321	
September 3	6:00 p.m.	Maine	**New Mexico**	University Stadium • Albuquerque, NM	MWN	**W** 41–0	15,166	
September 3	6:30 p.m.	**Boise State**	Oregon State	Reser Stadium • Corvallis, OR	ESPN	**L** 17–34	27,732	
September 3	10:00 p.m.	Western Kentucky	**Hawaii**	Clarence T. C. Ching Athletics Complex • Honolulu, HI	Spectrum Sports	**L** 17–49	9,346	
^{#}Rankings from AP Poll released prior to game. All times are in Mountain Time.

=== Week 2 ===
Date	Time	Visiting team	Home team	Site	TV	Result	Attendance	Ref.
September 9	7:00 p.m.	**Boise State**	**New Mexico**	University Stadium • Albuquerque, NM	CBSSN	**BSU** 31–14	16,157	
September 10	1:30 p.m.	Colorado	**Air Force**	Falcon Stadium • Colorado Springs, CO	CBS	**W** 41–10	33,647	
September 10	2:00 p.m.	Middle Tennessee	**Colorado State**	Canvas Stadium • Fort Collins, CO	MWN	**L** 19–34	27,641	
September 10	2:00 p.m.	**UNLV**	California	California Memorial Stadium • Berkeley, CA	P12N	**L** 14–20	38,180	
September 10	2:00 p.m.	Northern Colorado	**Wyoming**	War Memorial Stadium • Laramie, WY	MWN	**W** 33–10	22,863	
September 10	3:30 p.m.	No. 8 (FCS) Incarnate Word	**Nevada**	Mackay Stadium • Reno, NV	NSN	**L** 41–55	14,092	
September 10	5:00 p.m.	No. 16 (FCS) Weber State	**Utah State**	Maverick Stadium • Logan, UT	MWN	**L** 7–35	17,781	
September 10	5:30 p.m.	**San Jose State**	Auburn	Jordan–Hare Stadium • Auburn, AL	ESPNU	**L** 16–24	83,340	
September 10	6:00 p.m.	Idaho State	**San Diego State**	Snapdragon Stadium • San Diego, CA	MWN	**W** 38–7	27,865	
September 10	6:00 p.m.	**Hawaii**	No. 4 Michigan	Michigan Stadium • Ann Arbor, MI	BTN	**L** 10–56	110,012	
September 10	8:30 p.m.	Oregon State	**Fresno State**	Bulldog Stadium • Fresno, CA	CBSSN	**L** 32–35	41,031	
^{#}Rankings from AP Poll released prior to game. All times are in Mountain Time.

=== Week 3 ===
Date	Time	Visiting team	Home team	Site	TV	Result	Attendance	Ref.
September 16	6:00 p.m.	**Air Force**	**Wyoming**	War Memorial Stadium • Laramie, WY	CBSSN	**WYO** 17–14	18,277	
September 17	1:00 p.m.	North Texas	**UNLV**	Allegiant Stadium • Paradise, NV	SSSEN	**W** 58–27	19,623	
September 17	2:00 p.m.	No. 16 (FCS) UT Martin	**Boise State**	Albertsons Stadium • Boise, ID	FS1	**W** 30–7	36,396	
September 17	3:00 p.m.	**Colorado State**	Washington State	Martin Stadium • Pullman, WA	P12N	**L** 7–38	23,611	
September 17	5:30 p.m.	**Nevada**	Iowa	Kinnick Stadium • Iowa City, IA	BTN	**L** 0–27	69,250	
September 17	6:00 p.m.	UTEP	**New Mexico**	University Stadium • Albuquerque, NM	MWN	**W** 27–10	15,269	
September 17	8:00 p.m.	**San Diego State**	No. 14 Utah	Rice–Eccles Stadium • Salt Lake City, UT	ESPN2	**L** 7–35	51,602	
September 17	8:30 p.m.	**Fresno State**	No. 7 USC	Los Angeles Memorial Coliseum • Los Angeles, CA	FOX	**L** 17–45	67,226	
September 17	10:00 p.m.	Duquesne	**Hawaii**	Clarence T. C. Ching Athletics Complex • Honolulu, HI	Spectrum Sports	**W** 24–14	8,991	
^{#}Rankings from AP Poll released prior to game. All times are in Mountain Time.

=== Week 4 ===
Date	Time	Visiting team	Home team	Site	TV	Result	Attendance	Ref.
September 23	6:00 p.m.	**Nevada**	**Air Force**	Falcon Stadium • Colorado Springs, CO	FS1	**AF** 48–20	20,506	
September 23	7:00 p.m.	**Boise State**	UTEP	Sun Bowl • El Paso, TX	CBSSN	**L** 10–27	11,227	
September 24	1:30 p.m.	Toledo	**San Diego State**	Snapdragon Stadium • San Diego, CA	FS1	**W** 17–14	27,108	
September 24	2:00 p.m.	No. 7 (FCS) Sacramento State	**Colorado State**	Canvas Stadium • Fort Collins, CO	MWN	**L** 10–41	25,445	
September 24	5:00 p.m.	**UNLV**	**Utah State**	Maverick Stadium • Logan, UT	CBSSN	**UNLV** 34–24	17,454	
September 24	5:30 p.m.	**New Mexico**	LSU	Tiger Stadium • Baton Rouge, LA	SECN+/ESPN+	**L** 0–38	100,501	
September 24	6:00 p.m.	**Hawaii**	New Mexico State	Aggie Memorial Stadium • Las Cruces, NM	FloSports	**L** 26–45	12,879	
September 24	8:15 p.m.	**Wyoming**	No. 19 BYU	LaVell Edwards Stadium • Provo, UT	ESPN2	**L** 24–38	60,092	
September 24	8:30 p.m.	Western Michigan	**San Jose State**	CEFCU Stadium • San Jose, CA	CBSSN	**W** 34–6	17,058	
^{#}Rankings from AP Poll released prior to game. All times are in Mountain Time.

=== Week 5 ===
Date	Time	Visiting team	Home team	Site	TV	Result	Attendance	Ref.
September 29	6:00 p.m.	**Utah State**	No. 19 BYU	LaVell Edwards Stadium • Provo, UT (Beehive Boot, rivalry)	ESPN	**L** 26–38	59,417	
September 30	6:00 p.m.	**San Diego State**	**Boise State**	Albertsons Stadium • Boise, ID	FS1	**BSU** 35–13	34,910	
September 30	9:00 p.m.	**New Mexico**	**UNLV**	Allegiant Stadium • Paradise, NV	CBSSN	**UNLV** 31–20	21,605	
October 1	10:00 a.m.	Navy	**Air Force**	Falcon Stadium • Colorado Springs, CO (Commander-in-Chief's Trophy)	CBS	**W** 13–10	36,947	
October 1	1:30 p.m.	**Fresno State**	UConn	Rentschler Field • East Hartford, CT	CBSSN	**L** 14–19	20,952	
October 1	5:30 p.m.	**San Jose State**	**Wyoming**	War Memorial Stadium • Laramie, WY	CBSSN	**SJSU** 33–16	17,765	
^{#}Rankings from AP Poll released prior to game. All times are in Mountain Time.

=== Week 6 ===
Date	Time	Visiting team	Home team	Site	TV	Result	Attendance	Ref.
October 7	8:30 p.m.	Colorado State	Nevada	Mackay Stadium • Reno, NV	FS1	**CSU** 17–14	18,255	
October 7	8:30 p.m.	UNLV	San Jose State	CEFCU Stadium • San Jose, CA	CBSSN	**SJSU** 40–7	16,669	
October 8	5:00 p.m.	Wyoming	New Mexico	University Stadium • Albuquerque, NM	CBSSN	**WYO** 27–14	14,226	
October 8	5:00 p.m.	Air Force	Utah State	Maverick Stadium • Logan, UT	FS1	**USU** 34–27	19,105	
October 8	7:45 p.m.	Fresno State	Boise State	Albertsons Stadium • Boise, ID (rivalry)	FS1	**BSU** 40–20	37,663	
October 8	8:30 p.m.	Hawaii	San Diego State	Snapdragon Stadium • San Diego, CA	CBSSN	**SDSU** 16–14	33,073	
^{#}Rankings from AP Poll released prior to game. All times are in Mountain Time.

=== Week 7 ===
Date	Time	Visiting team	Home team	Site	TV	Result	Attendance	Ref.
October 15	5:00 p.m.	**Utah State**	**Colorado State**	Canvas Stadium • Fort Collins, CO	CBSSN	**USU** 17–13	35,009	
October 15	6:00 p.m.	**New Mexico**	New Mexico State	Aggie Memorial Stadium • Las Cruces, NM (Rio Grande Rivalry)	FloSports	**L** 9–21		
October 15	8:30 p.m.	**Air Force**	**UNLV**	Allegiant Stadium • Paradise, NV	CBSSN	**AF** 42–7	23,847	
October 15	8:45 p.m.	**San Jose State**	**Fresno State**	Bulldog Stadium • Fresno, CA (rivalry)	FS2	**FRES** 17–10	41,031	
October 15	10:00 p.m.	**Nevada**	**Hawaii**	Clarence T. C. Ching Athletics Complex • Honolulu, HI	NSN / Spectrum Sports	**HAW** 31–16	9,231	
^{#}Rankings from AP Poll released prior to game. All times are in Mountain Time.

=== Week 8 ===
Date	Time	Visiting team	Home team	Site	TV	Result	Attendance	Ref.
October 22	12:30 p.m.	UNLV	Notre Dame	Notre Dame Stadium • South Bend, IN	Peacock	**L** 21–44	73,165	
October 22	2:00 p.m.	Hawaii	**Colorado State**	Canvas Stadium • Fort Collins, CO	Spectrum Sports	**CSU** 17–13	22,843	
October 22	4:00 p.m.	San Jose State	New Mexico State	Aggie Memorial Stadium • Las Cruces, NM	FloSports	**Canceled**	n/a	
October 22	4:30 p.m.	Fresno State	**New Mexico**	University Stadium • Albuquerque, NM	FS2	**FRES** 41–9	14,667	
October 22	5:00 p.m.	Boise State	**Air Force**	Falcon Stadium • Colorado Springs, CO	CBSSN	**BSU** 19–14	25,254	
October 22	7:45 p.m.	Utah State	**Wyoming**	War Memorial Stadium • Laramie, WY (Bridger’s Battle)	FS2	**WYO** 28–14	21,420	
October 22	8:30 p.m.	San Diego State	**Nevada**	Mackay Stadium • Reno, NV	CBSSN	**SDSU** 23–7	16,363	
^{#}Rankings from AP Poll released prior to game. All times are in Mountain Time.

=== Week 9 ===
Date	Time	Visiting team	Home team	Site	TV	Result	Attendance	Ref.
October 29	5:00 p.m.	**Colorado State**	**Boise State**	Albertsons Stadium • Boise, ID	FS1	**BSU** 49–10	33,895	
October 29	8:30 p.m.	**San Diego State**	**Fresno State**	Bulldog Stadium • Fresno, CA (rivlary)	FS1	**FRES** 32–28	37,107	
October 29	8:30 p.m.	**Nevada**	**San Jose State**	CEFCU Stadium • San Jose, CA	CBSSN	**SJSU** 35–28	17,117	
October 29	10:00 p.m.	**Wyoming**	**Hawaii**	Clarence T. C. Ching Athletics Complex • Honolulu, HI (rivlary)	Spectrum Sports	**WYO** 27–20	9,346	
^{#}Rankings from AP Poll released prior to game. All times are in Mountain Time.

=== Week 10 ===
Date	Time	Visiting team	Home team	Site	TV	Result	Attendance	Ref.
November 5	9:30 a.m.	**Air Force**	Army	Globe Life Field • Arlington, TX (Commander-in-Chief's Trophy)	CBS	**W** 13–7	33,912	
November 5	1:30 p.m.	**New Mexico**	**Utah State**	Maverick Stadium • Logan, UT	CBSSN	**USU** 27–10	14,154	
November 5	5:00 p.m.	**UNLV**	**San Diego State**	Snapdragon Stadium • San Diego, CA	CBSSN	**SDSU** 14–10	28,854	
November 5	5:00 p.m.	BYU	**Boise State**	Albertsons Stadium • Boise, ID	FS2	**L** 28–31	36,461	
November 5	8:30 p.m.	**Hawaii**	**Fresno State**	Bulldog Stadium • Fresno, CA (rivalry)	FS2	**FRES** 55–13	39,005	
November 5	8:30 p.m.	**Colorado State**	**San Jose State**	CEFCU Stadium • San Jose, CA	NBCSBA	**SJSU** 28–16	16,382	
^{#}Rankings from AP Poll released prior to game. All times are in Mountain Time.

=== Week 11 ===
Date	Time	Visiting team	Home team	Site	TV	Result	Attendance	Ref.
November 11	8:30 p.m.	Fresno State	UNLV	Allegiant Stadium • Paradise, NV	CBSSN	**FRES** 37–30	23,146	
November 12	1:30 p.m.	New Mexico	Air Force	Falcon Stadium • Colorado Springs, CO	CBSSN	**AF** 35–3	20,827	
November 12	5:00 p.m.	Wyoming	Colorado State	Canvas Stadium • Fort Collins, CO (Border War)	CBSSN	**WYO** 14–13	30,300	
November 12	8:30 p.m.	San Jose State	San Diego State	Snapdragon Stadium • San Diego, CA	FS1	**SDSU** 43–27	28,406	
November 12	8:30 p.m.	Boise State	Nevada	Mackay Stadium • Reno, NV (rivalry)	CBSSN	**BSU** 41–3	14,960	
November 12	9:00 p.m.	Utah State	Hawaii	Clarence T. C. Ching Athletics Complex • Honolulu, HI	Spectrum Sports	**USU** 41–34	8,862	
^{#}Rankings from AP Poll released prior to game. All times are in Mountain Time.

=== Week 12 ===
Date	Time	Visiting team	Home team	Site	TV	Result	Attendance	Ref.
November 18	7:45 p.m.	San Diego State	New Mexico	University Stadium • Albuquerque, NM	FS1	**SDSU** 34–10	14,309	
November 19	5:00 p.m.	Boise State	Wyoming	War Memorial Stadium • Laramie, WY	CBSSN	**BSU** 20–17	17,345	
November 19	7:00 p.m.	Colorado State	Air Force	Falcon Stadium • Colorado Springs, CO	FS2	**AF** 24–12	20,121	
November 19	7:45 p.m.	San Jose State	Utah State	Maverick Stadium • Logan, UT	FS1	**USU** 35–31	13,677	
November 19	8:30 p.m.	Fresno State	Nevada	Mackay Stadium • Reno, NV	CBSSN	**FRES** 41–14	12,501	
November 19	9:00 p.m.	UNLV	Hawaii	Clarence T. C. Ching Athletics Complex • Honolulu, HI	Spectrum Sports / SSSEN	**HAW** 31–25	9,346	
^{#}Rankings from AP Poll released prior to game. All times are in Mountain Time.

=== Week 13 ===
Date	Time	Visiting team	Home team	Site	TV	Result	Attendance	Ref.
November 25	10:00 a.m.	Utah State	Boise State	Albertsons Stadium • Boise, ID	CBS	**BSU** 42–23	31,402	
November 25	1:30 p.m.	New Mexico	Colorado State	Canvas Stadium • Fort Collins, CO	CBSSN	**CSU** 17–0	20,107	
November 25	8:00 p.m.	Wyoming	Fresno State	Bulldog Stadium • Fresno, CA	FS1	**FRES** 30–0	40,214	
November 26	1:30 p.m.	Hawaii	San Jose State	CEFCU Stadium • San Jose, CA	Spectrum Sports	**SJSU** 27–14	15,012	
November 26	4:00 p.m.	Nevada	UNLV	Allegiant Stadium • Paradise, NV (Fremont Cannon)	SSSEN / NSN	**UNLV** 27–22	24,873	
November 26	7:00 p.m.	Air Force	San Diego State	Snapdragon Stadium • San Diego, CA	CBSSN	**AF** 13–3	25,223	
^{#}Rankings from AP Poll released prior to game. All times are in Mountain Time.

=== Week 14 – Mountain West Conference Championship Game ===
Date	Time	Visiting team	Home team	Site	TV	Result	Attendance	Ref.
December 3	2:00 p.m.	**Fresno State**	**Boise State**	Albertsons Stadium • Boise, ID (rivalry)	FOX	**FRES** 28–16		
^{#}Rankings from AP Poll released prior to game. All times are in Mountain Time.

== Postseason ==
=== Bowl Games ===
Legend
Mountain West win
Mountain West loss

Bowl game	Date	Site	Television	Time (MST)	Mountain West team	Opponent	Score	Attendance
LA Bowl	December 17	SoFi Stadium • Inglewood, CA	ABC	1:30 p.m.	Fresno State	Washington State	W 29–6	32,405
Frisco Bowl	December 17	Toyota Stadium • Frisco, TX	ESPN	7:15 p.m.	Boise State	North Texas	W 35–32	12,211
Famous Idaho Potato Bowl	December 20	Albertsons Stadium • Boise, ID	ESPN	1:30 p.m.	San Jose State	Eastern Michigan	L 27–41	10,122
Armed Forces Bowl	December 22	Amon G. Carter Stadium • Fort Worth, TX	ESPN	6:30 p.m.	Air Force	Baylor	W 30–15	
Hawaii Bowl	December 24	Clarence T. C. Ching Athletics Complex • Honolulu, HI	ESPN	6:00 p.m	San Diego State	Middle Tennessee	L 23–25	6,605
First Responder Bowl	December 27	Gerald J. Ford Stadium • Dallas, TX	ESPN	12:15 p.m.	Utah State	Memphis	L 10–38	
Arizona Bowl	December 30	Arizona Stadium • Tucson, AZ	Barstool Sports	2:30 p.m.	Wyoming	Ohio	L 27–30 ^{OT}	

=== Selection of teams ===
- Bowl eligible (7): Air Force, Boise State, Fresno State, San Diego State, San Jose State, Utah State, Wyoming
- Bowl ineligible (5): Colorado State, Hawaii, Nevada, New Mexico, UNLV

== Mountain West records vs. other conferences ==
2022–2023 records against non-conference foes:

Regular Season

Power Five Conferences	Record
ACC	0–0
Big 12	0–0
Big Ten	0–4
BYU/Notre Dame	0–4
Pac-12	1–7
SEC	0–4
Power 5 Total	1–19
Other FBS Conferences	Record
American	2–0
C–USA	2–3
Independents (Excluding BYU/Notre Dame)	3–3
MAC	2–0
Sun Belt	1–0
Other FBS Total	11–5
FCS Opponents	Record
Football Championship Subdivision	9–3
Total Non-Conference Record	21–27

Postseason

Power Five Conferences	Record
ACC	0–0
Big 12	0–0
Big Ten	0–0
BYU/Notre Dame	0–0
Pac-12	0–0
SEC	0–0
Power 5 Total	0–0
Other FBS Conferences	Record
American	0–0
C–USA	0–0
Independents (Excluding BYU/Notre Dame)	0–0
MAC	0–0
Sun Belt	0–0
Other FBS Total	0–0
Total Bowl Record	0–0

=== Mountain West vs Power 5 matchups ===
This is a list of games the Mountain West has scheduled versus power conference teams (ACC, Big Ten, Big 12, Pac-12, BYU, Notre Dame and SEC). All rankings are from the current AP Poll at the time of the game.

Date	Conference	Visitor	Home	Site	Score
August 27	Big Ten	Wyoming	Illinois	Memorial Stadium • Champaign, IL	L 6–38
August 27	SEC	Vanderbilt	Hawaii	Clarence T. C. Ching Athletics Complex • Honolulu, HI	L 10–63
September 3	Pac-12	Boise State	Oregon State	Reser Stadium • Corvallis, OR	L 17–34
September 3	Big Ten	Colorado State	No. 8 Michigan	Michigan Stadium • Ann Arbor, MI	L 7–51
September 3	SEC	Utah State	No. 1 Alabama	Bryant–Denny Stadium • Tuscaloosa, AL	L 0–55
September 3	Pac-12	Arizona	San Diego State	Snapdragon Stadium • San Diego, CA	L 20–38
September 10	Pac-12	Colorado	Air Force	Falcon Stadium • Colorado Springs, CO	W 41–10
September 10	Pac-12	Oregon State	Fresno State	Bulldog Stadium • Fresno, CA	L 32–35
September 10	Big Ten	Hawaii	No. 4 Michigan	Michigan Stadium • Ann Arbor, MI	L 10–56
September 10	SEC	San Jose State	Auburn	Jordan–Hare Stadium • Auburn, AL	L 16–24
September 10	Pac-12	UNLV	California	California Memorial Stadium • Berkeley, CA	L 14–20
September 17	Pac-12	Colorado State	Washington State	Martin Stadium • Pullman, WA	L 7–38
September 17	Pac-12	Fresno State	No. 7 USC	Los Angeles Memorial Coliseum • Los Angeles, CA	L 17–45
September 17	Big Ten	Nevada	Iowa	Kinnick Stadium • Iowa City, IA	L 0–27
September 17	Pac-12	San Diego State	No. 14 Utah	Rice–Eccles Stadium • Salt Lake City, UT	L 7–35
September 24	SEC	New Mexico	LSU	Tiger Stadium • Baton Rouge, LA	L 0–38
September 24	Independent	Wyoming	No. 19 BYU	LaVell Edwards Stadium • Provo, UT	L 24–38
September 30	Independent	Utah State	BYU	LaVell Edwards Stadium • Provo, UT (Beehive Boot, rivalry)	L 26-38
October 22	Independent	UNLV	Notre Dame	Notre Dame Stadium • South Bend, IN	L 21–44
November 5	Independent	BYU	Boise State	Albertsons Stadium • Boise, ID	L 28–31

=== Mountain West vs Group of Five matchups ===
The following games include Mountain West teams competing against teams from the American, C-USA, MAC or Sun Belt.

Date	Conference	Visitor	Home	Site	Score
September 3	American	Tulsa	Wyoming	War Memorial Stadium • Laramie, WY	W 40–37 ^{2OT}
September 3	C-USA	Western Kentucky	Hawaii	Clarence T. C. Ching Athletics Complex • Honolulu, HI	L 17–49
September 3	Sun Belt	Texas State	Nevada	Mackay Stadium • Reno, NV	W 38–14
September 10	C-USA	Middle Tennessee	Colorado State	Canvas Stadium • Fort Collins, CO	L 19–34
September 17	C-USA	UTEP	New Mexico	University Stadium • Albuquerque, NM	W 27–10
September 17	C-USA	North Texas	UNLV	Allegiant Stadium • Paradise, NV	W 58–27
September 24	C-USA	Boise State	UTEP	Sun Bowl • El Paso, TX	L 10–27
September 24	MAC	Toledo	San Diego State	Snapdragon Stadium • San Diego, CA	W 17–14
September 24	MAC	Western Michigan	San Jose State	CEFCU Stadium • San Jose, CA	W 34–6
October 1	American	Navy	Air Force	Falcon Stadium • Colorado Springs, CO (Commander-in-Chief's Trophy)	W 13-10

=== Mountain West vs FBS independents matchups ===
The following games include Mountain West teams competing against FBS Independents, which includes Army, Liberty, New Mexico State, UConn, or UMass.

Date	Visitor	Home	Site	Score
August 27	UConn	Utah State	Maverick Stadium • Logan, UT	W 31–20
August 27	Nevada	New Mexico State	Aggie Memorial Stadium • Las Cruces, NM	W 23–12
September 24	Hawaii	New Mexico State	Aggie Memorial Stadium • Las Cruces, NM	L 26–45
October 1	Fresno State	UConn	Rentschler Field • East Hartford, CT	L 14-19
October 15	New Mexico	New Mexico State	Aggie Memorial Stadium • Las Cruces, NM (Rio Grande Rivalry)	L 9–21
October 22	San Jose State	New Mexico State	Aggie Memorial Stadium • Las Cruces, NM	Canceled
November 5	Air Force	Army	Globe Life Field • Arlington, TX (Commander-in-Chief's Trophy)	W 13–7

=== Mountain West vs. FCS matchups ===
The following games include Mountain West teams competing against FCS schools.

Date	Visitor	Home	Site	Score
August 27	Idaho State	UNLV	Allegiant Stadium • Paradise, NV	W 52–21
September 1	Cal Poly	Fresno State	Bulldog Stadium • Fresno, CA	W 35-7
September 1	Portland State	San Jose State	CEFCU Stadium • San Jose, CA	W 21-17
September 3	No. 21 (FCS) Northern Iowa	Air Force	Falcon Stadium • Colorado Springs, CO	W 48–17
September 3	Maine	New Mexico	University Stadium • Albuquerque, NM	W 41–0
September 10	No. 16 (FCS) Weber State	Utah State	Maverick Stadium • Logan, UT	L 7–35
September 10	Northern Colorado	Wyoming	War Memorial Stadium • Laramie, WY	W 33–10
September 10	No. 8 (FCS) Incarnate Word	Nevada	Mackay Stadium • Reno, NV	L 41–55
September 10	Idaho State	San Diego State	Snapdragon Stadium • San Diego, CA	W 38–7
September 17	No. 16 (FCS) UT Martin	Boise State	Alberstons Stadium • Boise, ID	W 30–7
September 17	Duquesne	Hawaii	Clarence T. C. Ching Athletics Complex • Honolulu, HI	W 24–14
September 24	No. 7 (FCS) Sacramento State	Colorado State	Canvas Stadium • Fort Collins, CO	L 10–41

== Awards and honors ==
=== Player of the week honors ===
Week	Offensive			Defensive			Special Teams			Freshman		
Week	Player	Team	Position	Player	Team	Position	Player	Team	Position	Player	Team	Position
Week 0 (August 29)	Doug Brumfield	UNLV	QB	Isaiah Essissima	Nevada	CB	Brandon Talton	Nevada	K	Robert Briggs	Utah State	RB
Week 1 (September 5)	Andrew Peasley	Wyoming	QB	Bentlee Sanders	Nevada	DB	John Hoyland	Wyoming	K	Isaac Larsen	Utah State	S
Week 2 (September 12)	Brad Roberts	Air Force	RB	Shae Suiaunoa	Wyoming	LB	John Hoyland (2)	Wyoming	K	Christian Washington	New Mexico	RB
Week 3 (September 19)	Aidan Robbins	UNLV	RB	Reco Hannah	New Mexico	LB	Jonah Dalmas	Boise State	K	A. J. Haulcy	New Mexico	S
Week 4 (September 26)	Brad Roberts (2)	Air Force	RB	Austin Ajiake	UNLV	LB	Jack Browning	San Diego State	K/P	Jordan Pollard	San Jose State	LB
Week 5 (October 3)	Chevan Cordeiro	San Jose State	QB	DJ Schramm	Boise State	LB	Daniel Gutierrez	UNLV	K	Taylen Green	Boise State	QB
Week 6 (October 10)	Chevan Cordeiro (2)	San Jose State	QB	Ezekiel Noa	Boise State	LB	Jonah Dalmas (2)	Boise State	K	Ashton Jeanty	Boise State	RB
Week 7 (October 17)	Brad Roberts (3)	Air Force	RB	David Perales	Fresno State	DE	Stephen Kotsanlee	Utah State	P	Bishop Davenport	Utah State	QB
Week 8 (October 24)	Titus Swen	Wyoming	RB	Michael Shawcroft	San Diego State	LB	Jonah Dalmas (3)	Boise State	K	A. J. Haulcy (2)	New Mexico	S
Week 9 (October 31)	Taylen Green	Boise State	QB	Viliami Fehoko	San Jose State	DE	John Hoyland (3)	Wyoming	K	Taylen Green (2)	Boise State	QB
Week 10 (November 7)	Jake Haener	Fresno State	QB	Dallas Branch	San Diego State	CB	Connor Coles	Utah State	K	Max Alford	Utah State	LB
Week 11 (November 14)	Jalen Mayden	San Diego State	QB	Isaac Larsen	Utah State	S	Daniel Gutierrez (2)	UNLV	K	Isaac Larsen (2)	Utah State	S
Week 12 (November 21)	Jake Haener (2)	Fresno State	QB	JL Skinner	Boise State	S	Jack Browning (2)	San Diego State	K/P	Taylen Green (3)	Boise State	QB
Week 13 (November 28)	Taylen Green (2)	Boise State	QB	Jonathan Baldwin	UNLV	S	Daniel Gutierrez (3)	UNLV	K	Taylen Green (4)	Boise State	QB

=== Mountain West Individual Awards ===
The following individuals received postseason honors as voted by the Mountain West Conference football coaches at the end of the season.

Award	Player	School
Offensive Player of the Year	Brad Roberts, Sr., RB	Air Force
Defensive Player of the Year	Viliami Fehoko DL	San Jose State
Special Teams Player of the Year	Jack Browning Sr K/P	San Diego State
Freshman Player of the Year	Taylen Green, QB	Boise State
Coach of the Year	Andy Avalos	Boise State

=== All-conference teams ===
The following players were selected as part of the Mountain West's All-Conference Teams.

Position	Player	Team
First Team Offense
WR	Tory Horton	Colorado State
WR	Jalen Cropper	Fresno State
WR	Elijah Cooks	San Jose State
OL	Isaac Cochran	Air Force
OL	John Ojukwu	Boise State
OL	Ilm Manning	Hawaii
OL	Alama Uluave	San Diego State
OL	Alfred Edwards	Utah State
TE	Caleb Phillips	Hawaii
QB	Jake Haener	Fresno State
RB	Brad Roberts	Air Force
RB	Jordan Mims	Fresno State
KR	Jordan Byrd	San Diego State
PK	John Hoyland	Wyoming
First Team Defense
DL	David Perales	Fresno State
DL	Jonah Tavai	San Diego State
DL	Viliami Fehoko	San Jose State
DL	Cade Hall	San Jose State
LB	Caden McDonald	San Diego State
LB	Kyle Harmon	San Jose State
LB	Austin Ajiake	UNLV
LB	Easton Gibbs	Wyoming
DB	JL Skinner	Boise State
DB	Jack Howell	Colorado State
DB	Bentlee Sanders	Nevada
DB	Patrick McMorris	San Diego State
PR	Jordan Byrd	San Diego State
P	Jack Browning	San Diego State

Position	Player	Team
Second Team Offense
WR	Nikko Remigio	Fresno State
WR	Tyrell Shavers	San Diego State
WR	Brian Cobbs	Utah State
OL	Everett Smalley	Air Force
OL	Cade Beresford	Boise State
OL	Bula Schmidt	Fresno State
OL	Micah Vanterpool	Hawaii
OL	Cade Bennett	San Diego State
TE	Mark Redman	San Diego State
QB	Chevan Cordeiro	San Jose State
RB	George Holani	Boise State
RB	Calvin Tyler	Utah State
KR	Christian Washington	New Mexico
PK	Daniel Gutierrez	UNLV
Second Team Defense
DL	Scott Matlock	Boise State
DL	Mohamed Kamara	Colorado State
DL	Dom Peterson	Nevada
DL	Adam Plant	UNLV
LB	Vince Sanford	Air Force
LB	Ezekiel Noa	Boise State
LB	DJ Schramm	Boise State
LB	Michael Shawcroft	San Diego State
DB	Trey Taylor	Air Force
DB	Evan Williams	Fresno State
DB	A. J. Haulcy	New Mexico
DB	Isaac Larsen	Utah State
PR	Nikko Remigio	Fresno State
P	Aaron Rodriguez	New Mexico

== NFL draft ==
The following list includes all Mountain West players who were drafted in the 2023 NFL draft.

Player	Position	School	Draft Round	Round Pick	Overall Pick	Team
Jake Haener	QB	Fresno State	4	25	127	New Orleans Saints
Viliami Fehoko	DE	San Jose State	4	27	129	Dallas Cowboys
JL Skinner	S	Boise State	6	6	183	Denver Broncos
Jerrick Reed II	S	New Mexico	6	21	198	Seattle Seahawks
Scott Matlock	DT	Boise State	6	23	200	Los Angeles Chargers
