= Michael Dansby =

Michael Dansby may refer to:

- Michael Dansby (offensive lineman) (born 1983), American football player
- Michael Dansby (cornerback) (born 2001), American football player
