= XFL Draft =

XFL draft may refer to:

- 2001 XFL draft, the only draft for the first XFL professional American football league
- 2020 XFL draft, the inaugural draft for the rebooted XFL professional American football league
- 2023 XFL draft, second draft for the rebooted league
- 2023 XFL rookie draft
