= Dansby =

Dansby is a surname. Notable people with the surname include:

- B. Baldwin Dansby (1879–1975), American academic administrator and college president
- Karlos Dansby (born 1981), American football player
- Michael Dansby (disambiguation), multiple people

== See also ==
- Dansby Cemetery, cemetery in Rusk County, Texas, United States
- Dansby Swanson (born 1994), American baseball player
