= Kyle Harmon =

Kyle Harmon may refer to:

- Kyle Harmon (CSI: Miami), character from CSI: Miami
- Kyle Harmon (American football), American football linebacker
