= 2019 New Mexico Bowl =

Postseason college football bowl game

- 14th New Mexico Bowl
| Central Michigan Chippewas | San Diego State Aztecs |
| (8–5) | (9–3) |
| MAC | Mountain West |
| 11 | 48 |
| Head coach: Jim McElwain | Head coach: Rocky Long |
| | 1 | 2 | 3 | 4 | Total |
|---|---|---|---|---|---|
| Central Michigan | 3 | 0 | 8 | 0 | 11 |
| San Diego State | 7 | 13 | 21 | 7 | 48 |
- Date: December 21, 2019
- Season: 2019
- Stadium: Dreamstyle Stadium
- Location: Albuquerque, New Mexico
- MVP: Offense: Jordan Byrd (RB, SDSU) & Jesse Matthews (WR, SDSU) Defense: Kyahva Tezino (LB, SDSU)
- Favorite: San Diego State by 3.5
- Referee: Adam Savoie (AAC)
- Attendance: 18,823
- Payout: US$1,050,000

United States TV coverage
- Network: ESPN & ESPN Radio
- Announcers: ESPN: Clay Matvick (play-by-play), Ryan Leaf (analyst), Jerry Punch (sideline); ESPN Radio: Dave Neal (play-by-play), D.J. Shockley (analyst), Dawn Davenport (sideline)

The 2019 New Mexico Bowl was a college football bowl game played on December 21, 2019, with kickoff at 2:00 p.m. EST (12:00 p.m. local MST) on ESPN. It was the 14th edition of the New Mexico Bowl, and one of the 2019–20 bowl games concluding the 2019 FBS football season.

The 2019 edition of the New Mexico Bowl did not have a corporate naming sponsor. The game was going to be sponsored by DreamHouse, an Albuquerque-based company focused on the film industry. However, the company was found to be a fraudulent enterprise, operating without a business license, and the sponsorship agreement was cancelled.

== Teams ==
This was the first time that Central Michigan and San Diego State played each other, and the first time either played in the New Mexico Bowl.

=== Central Michigan Chippewas ===
Central Michigan entered the game with an 8–5 record (6–2 in conference). The Chippewas finished atop the West Division of the Mid-American Conference (MAC), before losing the MAC Championship Game to Miami (Ohio), 21–26.

=== San Diego State Aztecs ===
San Diego State entered the game with a 9–3 record (5–3 in conference). They finished even with Hawaii atop the West Division of the Mountain West Conference, with the division title going to the Rainbow Warriors due to their 14–11 defeat of the Aztecs during the regular season.

== Game summary ==
2019 New Mexico Bowl

| Quarter | 1 | 2 | 3 | 4 | Total |
|---|---|---|---|---|---|
| Central Michigan | 3 | 0 | 8 | 0 | 11 |
| San Diego State | 7 | 13 | 21 | 7 | 48 |

at Dreamstyle Stadium • Albuquerque, New Mexico

- Date: Saturday, December 21, 2019
- Game time: 2:00 p.m. EST (12:00 p.m. MST)
- Game weather: Sunny • Temperature: 42 °F (6 °C) • Wind: NW 4 mph
- Game attendance: 18,823
- Referee: Adam Savoie
- TV announcers (ESPN): Clay Matvick (play-by-play), Ryan Leaf (analyst) and Jerry Punch (sideline)
- ESPN game summary

Game information

First Quarter

- (12:34) SDSU – Ryan Agnew 22 yard pass to Jesse Matthews, Matt Araiza kick (Drive: 4 plays 32 yards, 1:43; San Diego State 7–0)
- (10:40) CMU – Ryan Tice 33 yard field goal (Drive: 5 plays, 60 yards, 1:54; San Diego State 7–3)

Second Quarter

- (11:46) SDSU – Matt Araiza 48 yard field goal (Drive: 10 plays, 58 yards, 3:46; San Diego State 10–3)
- (6:22) SDSU – Matt Araiza 31 yard field goal (Drive: 11 plays, 56 yards, 4:29; San Diego State 13–3)
- (5:26) SDSU – Ryan Agnew 74 yard pass to Jesse Matthews, Matt Araiza kick (Drive: 1 play, 74 yards, 0:13; San Diego State 20–3)

Third Quarter

- (9:51) SDSU – Jordan Byrd 2 yard rush, Matt Araiza kick (Drive: 4 plays, 58 yards, 2:13; San Diego State 27–3)
- (6:24) SDSU – Ryan Agnew 29 yard pass to TJ Sullivan, Matt Araiza kick (Drive: 5 plays, 39 yards, 2:34; San Diego State 34–3)
- (5:13) CMU – Kobe Lewis 66 yard rush, 2-point pass good (Drive: 3 plays, 75 yards, 1:11; San Diego State 34–11)
- (1:42) SDSU – Chase Jasmin 2 yard rush, Matt Araiza kick (Drive: 2 plays, 58 yards, 0:45; San Diego State 41–11)

Fourth Quarter

- (5:16) SDSU – Darren Hall 20 yard fumble return, Matt Araiza kick (San Diego State 48–11)

=== Statistics ===
| Statistics | CMU | SDSU |
|---|---|---|
| First downs | 8 | 24 |
| Plays–yards | 57–277 | 76–510 |
| Rushes–yards | 27–112 | 45–223 |
| Passing yards | 165 | 287 |
| Passing: comp–att–int | 12–30–3 | 18–31–1 |
| Time of possession | 21:41 | 38:19 |

| Team | Category | Player | Statistics |
|---|---|---|---|
| Central Michigan | Passing | Quinten Dormady | 11/26, 164 yards, 3 INT |
| Central Michigan | Rushing | Kobe Lewis | 5 carries, 97 yards, 1 TD |
| Central Michigan | Receiving | Kalil Pimpleton | 3 receptions, 71 yards |
| San Diego State | Passing | Ryan Agnew | 18/31, 287 yards, 3 TD, 1 INT |
| San Diego State | Rushing | Jordan Byrd | 17 carries, 139 yards, 1 TD |
| San Diego State | Receiving | Jesse Matthews | 3 receptions, 111 yards, 2 TD |
