= Brad Roberts (American football) =

American college football player (born 2000)

No. 20
- Position: Running back

Personal information
- Born: 2000 (age 25–26); Arvada, Colorado
- Listed height: 5 ft 11 in (1.80 m)
- Listed weight: 215 lb (98 kg)

Career information
- High school: Ralston Valley (Arvada, Colorado)
- College: Air Force (2019–2022)

Awards and highlights
- MW Offensive Player of the Year (2022); 2× First-team All-MW (2021, 2022)

Bradley Roberts (born c. 2000) is an American former football running back who played college football for the Air Force Falcons.

== High school ==
He attended Ralston Valley High School in Arvada, Colorado, receiving first-team All-Colorado honors as a senior.

== College career ==
Roberts enrolled in the United States Air Force Academy in 2019, but did not see game action as a freshman. As a sophomore in 2020, he led Air Force with 461 rushing yards in four games, an average of 115.2 yards per game. He rushed for a career-high 177 yards and three touchdowns against New Mexico on November 20, 2020.

As a junior in 2021, he rushed for 142 yards against New Mexico and added another 140 yards the following week against Wyoming. He finished the 2021 regular season with 1,279 rushing yards, eighth best among all Division I FBS players.

As a senior in 2022, Roberts had 1,425 rushing yards and 14 rushing touchdowns through games played on November 19, 2022. Roberts was named the Mountain West conference's Offensive Player of the Year for 2022.

On April 29, 2023, Roberts was granted permission to delay his service in order to play in the National Football League (NFL). He went undrafted and unsigned by any NFL team.
