= David Perales =

American gridiron football player (born 1999)

No. 99 – Montreal Alouettes
- Position: Defensive lineman
- Roster status: Practice roster
- CFL status: American

Personal information
- Born: April 9, 1999 (age 27); San Jose, California, U.S.
- Listed height: 6 ft 3 in (1.91 m)
- Listed weight: 240 lb (109 kg)

Career information
- High school: Merced (Merced, California)
- College: Merced JC (2017); Sacramento State (2018); Fresno State (2019–2022)
- NFL draft: 2023: undrafted

Career history
- Pittsburgh Steelers (2023–2024)*; Montreal Alouettes (2026–present)
- * Offseason or practice squad member only

Awards and highlights
- First-team All-MW (2022); 2× Second-team All-MW (2020, 2021)
- Stats at Pro Football Reference
- Stats at CFL.ca

David Perales (born April 9, 1999) is an American professional football defensive lineman for the Montreal Alouettes of the Canadian Football League (CFL). He played college football for the Merced Blue Devils, Sacramento State Hornets and Fresno State Bulldogs.

== Early life ==
Perales was born on April 9, 1999, in San Jose, California. He attended Merced High School in Merced, California. As a senior, Perales had 93 tackles, including nine for loss and 7.5 sacks.

== College career ==
Perales played college football for the Merced Blue Devils in 2017, Sacramento State Hornets in 2018 and Fresno State Bulldogs from 2019 to 2022. At Merced, he was named the Golden Coast Conference Defensive Player of the Year after he registered 64 tackles, 14 sacks, ten pass deflections and three forced fumbles. Perales transferred to Sacramento State University for the 2018 season, recording 23 tackles, including 7.5 for loss, 2.5 sacks, one pass break up, forced fumble and blocked kick.

In 2019, he sat out the season due to NCAA transfer rules after he committed to Fresno State University. In 33 games at Fresno, Perales 118 tackles, 23 sacks, one interception, six pass deflections, nine forced fumbles and two fumble recoveries. He was a two-time second-team All-MW selection in 2020 and 2021 and first-team in 2022.

== Professional career ==
Pre-draft measurables
Height	Weight	Arm length	Hand span	Wingspan	40-yard dash	10-yard split	20-yard split	20-yard shuttle	Three-cone drill	Bench press
6 ft 2 in (1.88 m)	248 lb (112 kg)	32 in (0.81 m)	9 1/4 in (0.23 m)	6 ft 6 3/4 in (2.00 m)	5.04 s	1.74 s	2.82 s	4.45 s	7.10 s	22 reps
All values from Pro day

=== Pittsburgh Steelers ===
After not being selected in the 2023 NFL draft, Perales signed with the Pittsburgh Steelers of the National Football League (NFL) as an undrafted free agent. On August 29, 2023, he was released and signed to the practice squad the following day. Perales spent the season on the practice squad and signed a futures contract on January 9, 2024. On August 1, he was waived and placed on the injured reserve due to a knee injury. On December 17, he was waived off the injured reserve.

=== Montreal Alouettes ===
On January 26, 2026, the Montreal Alouettes of the Canadian Football League (CFL) signed Perales. On May 31, he was signed to the practice roster. On July 11, Perales made his first start against the Calgary Stampeders. He had one tackle, one sack and one pass knock down, which won the game for the Alouettes. On September 17, Perales was placed on the practice roster.
