= Bentlee Sanders =

American gridiron football player (born 1998)

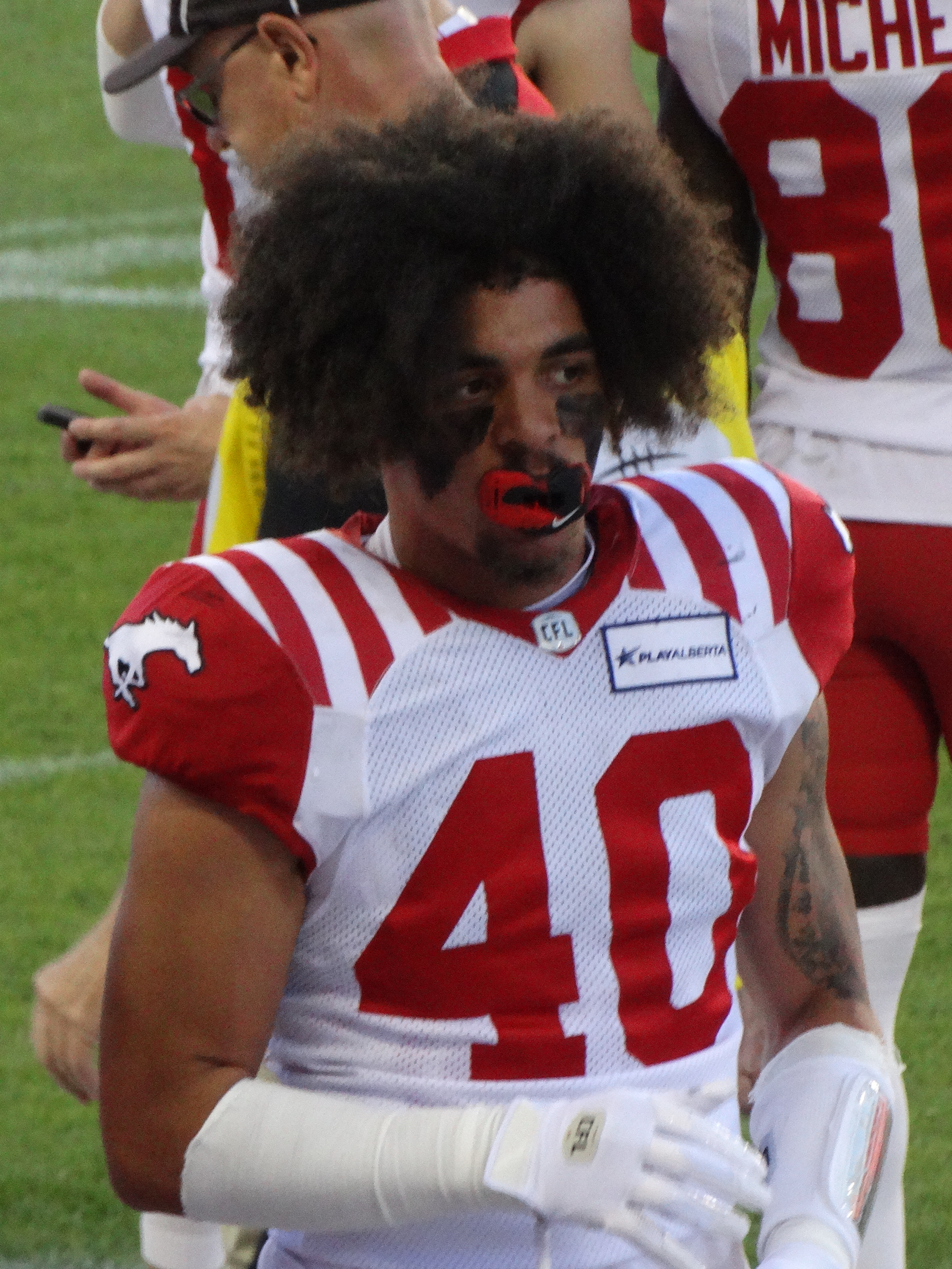
- Sanders with the Calgary Stampeders in 2024

Profile
- Position: Defensive back

Personal information
- Born: September 17, 1998 (age 28); Tampa, Florida, U.S.
- Listed height: 5 ft 9 in (1.75 m)
- Listed weight: 182 lb (83 kg)

Career information
- High school: Tampa Catholic (Tampa, Florida)
- College: South Florida (2017–2020); Nevada (2021–2022)

Career history
- 2024: Calgary Stampeders
- 2025: Ottawa Redblacks

Awards and highlights
- First-team All-Mountain West (2022)
- Stats at CFL.ca

Bentlee Sanders (born September 17, 1998) is an American professional football defensive back for the Ottawa Redblacks of the Canadian Football League (CFL). He played college football at South Florida and Nevada.

== Early life ==
Sanders attended Tampa Catholic High School in Tampa, Florida. He made 56 tackles and three interceptions his junior year, earning second-team All-State honors. He was rated a three-star recruit by 247Sports and Rivals.com.

== College career ==
Sanders first played college football for the South Florida Bulls from 2017 to 2020. He appeared in one game his freshman year in 2017 and made one tackle. He played in 12 games, starting two, in 2018, recording 28 tackles and one forced fumble while also returning 17 kickoffs for 455 yards. Sanders played in 12 games, starting nine, during the 2019 season, totaling 40 tackles, two sacks, two forced fumbles, and three pass breakups while also returning 19 kicks for 425 yards. He appeared in six games, starting four, during the COVID-19 shortened 2020 season, accumulating 25 tackles, one interception and two pass breakups. He also missed three games that year due to "COVID-19 issues".

Sanders transferred to play for the Nevada Wolf Pack from 2021 to 2022. He played in all 13 games, recording 24 tackles and two pass breakups in 2021. He started all 12 games for the Wolfpack during his sixth season of college football in 2022, totaling 82 tackles, five interceptions (one of which was returned for a touchdown), and three forced fumbles, earning first-team All-Mountain West honors. Sanders was named an Associated Press midseason All-American and one of 12 semifinalists for the Jim Thorpe Award after co-leading the FBS with five interceptions partway through the 2022 season.

== Professional career ==
Pre-draft measurables
Height	Weight	Arm length	Hand span	40-yard dash	10-yard split	20-yard split	20-yard shuttle	Three-cone drill	Vertical jump	Broad jump	Bench press
5 ft 8 1/9 in (1.73 m)	173 lb (78 kg)	29 in (0.74 m)	9 3/8 in (0.24 m)	4.41 s	1.53 s	2.58 s	4.46 s	7.32 s	33 in (0.84 m)	9 ft 7 in (2.92 m)	10 reps
All values from Pro Day

After going undrafted in the 2023 NFL draft, Sanders was invited to rookie minicamp on a tryout basis with the Philadelphia Eagles and Tennessee Titans. He was selected by the DC Defenders in the 2023 XFL rookie draft in June 2023.

He signed with the Calgary Stampeders of the Canadian Football League (CFL) on January 18, 2024. Sanders appeared in 16 games for the Calgary Stampeders, racking up 45 tackles, two forced fumbles, and an interception.

Sanders signed with the Ottawa Redblacks on August 18, 2025. He played in one regular season game while spending the remaining time with the team on the practice roster. He was later released on September 18, 2025.
