= 2022 Famous Idaho Potato Bowl =

Postseason college football bowl game

- 26th Famous Idaho Potato Bowl
Eastern Michigan Eagles	San Jose State Spartans
(8–4)	(7–4)
MAC	MWC
41	27
Head coach: Chris Creighton	Head coach: Brent Brennan
	1	2	3	4	Total
Eastern Michigan	9	21	11	0	41
San Jose State	13	0	7	7	27
- Date: December 20, 2022
- Season: 2022
- Stadium: Albertsons Stadium
- Location: Boise, Idaho
- MVP: Taylor Powell (QB, Eastern Michigan)
- Favorite: San Jose State by 4
- Referee: Nate Black (American)
- Attendance: 10,122
- Payout: US$800,000

United States TV coverage
- Network: ESPN
- Announcers: Clay Matvick (play-by-play), Rocky Boiman (analyst), and Dawn Davenport (sideline)

International TV coverage
- Network: ESPN Deportes
- Announcers: Kenneth Garay (play-by-play) and Sebastián Martínez Christensen (analyst)

The 2022 Famous Idaho Potato Bowl was a college football bowl game played on December 20, 2022, at Albertsons Stadium in Boise, Idaho. The 26th annual Famous Idaho Potato Bowl, the game featured the Eastern Michigan Eagles from the Mid-American Conference and the San Jose State Spartans from the Mountain West Conference. The game began at 1:33 p.m. MST and aired on ESPN. It was one of the 2022–23 bowl games concluding the 2022 FBS football season.

The Spartans started the game the better team, as they scored a touchdown on their first offensive drive and forced a fumble on their first defensive series. They scored another touchdown on their third drive, but the extra point was blocked and returned for a defensive two-point conversion by Eastern Michigan's Tristen Hines. Both teams' fortunes turned from there: Eastern Michigan scored touchdowns on each of their final four drives of the first half, and San Jose State committed a turnover on downs and threw two interceptions, giving the Eagles a 17-point halftime lead. The teams traded punts on each of their first two drives of the third quarter before Eastern Michigan extended their lead with a 51-yard field goal by Jesús Gómez, followed by a San Jose State touchdown. In some of their final drives, the teams traded touchdowns before trading interceptions, leading to the end of the game with Eastern Michigan defeating San Jose State, 41–27.

== Teams ==
The Famous Idaho Potato Bowl featured the Eastern Michigan Eagles from the Mid-American Conference and the San Jose State Spartans from the Mountain West Conference. This was the second all-time meeting between Eastern Michigan and San Jose State. Eastern Michigan — known then as the Hurons — defeated the Spartans 30–27 in the 1987 California Bowl in the teams' first meeting.

=== Eastern Michigan ===
The Eagles finished their regular season with an 8–4 record. They improved to 9–4 after the bowl victory, thus finishing with their second-best season in program history. This was the fourth bowl game appearance in the last five seasons for Eastern Michigan, though all of the previous three came without victories. The Eagles' only previous bowl win came against San Jose State in the 1987 California Bowl, mentioned above. Eastern Michigan's rush offense was expected to be an indicator of their potential for success in the contest, with running back Samson Evans entering the game with 1,084 yards on the season, and quarterback Taylor Powell had been reliable for EMU entering with over 1,800 passing yards and a 65 percent completion rate.

=== San Jose State ===
San Jose State entered the game with a 7–5 record. They entered with the nation's fourth-best turnover margin, having given the ball away just six times over the course of the season. The San Jose State defense was ranked No. 26 in the country, averaging 333 yards allowed per game. The Spartans' offense was led by quarterback Chevan Cordeiro, who entered the game with 508 yards rushing in addition to his passing stats. To complement Cordeiro, wide receiver Elijah Cooks was expected to be the leading playmaker out of the Spartans' receiving corps.

== Game summary ==
The Famous Idaho Potato Bowl was televised by ESPN, with a commentary team of Clay Matvick, Rocky Boiman, and Dawn Davenport. The game's American Athletic Conference officiating crew was led by referee Nate Black and umpire Bill Lamkin. At kickoff, the weather at Albertsons Stadium in Boise, Idaho, the site of the game, was 25 °F (−4 °C) and cloudy.

=== First half ===
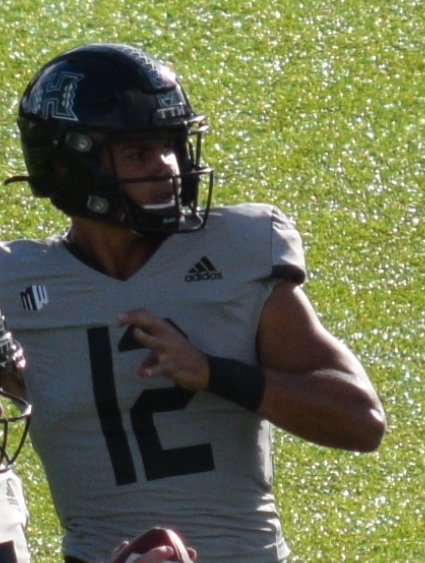
Chevan Cordeiro, pictured in 2021 with Hawaii, scored the first touchdown of the game.

Scheduled for a 1:30 p.m. MST start, the Famous Idaho Potato Bowl began at 1:33 p.m. with the opening kickoff by Eastern Michigan's Brady Pohl. San Jose State found the end zone quickly on their opening drive, scoring on a 27-yard rush by Chevan Cordeiro on their third play from scrimmage. On the third play of Eastern Michigan's opening drive, the Spartans defense came up with a sack and a fumble recovered by Kyle Harmon at the Eastern Michigan 26-yard-line. A sack on San Jose State's third down forced a 46-yard field goal attempt, which was missed by placekicker Taren Schive. A three-and-out followed for the Eagles; the punt went out-of-bounds at the San Jose State 45-yard-line. The Spartans increased their lead on their next drive - Nick Nash's 25-yard-rush put San Jose State into Eastern Michigan territory on their first play and Kairee Robinson rushed three times in a row to advance the ball to the Eastern Michigan 8-yard-line before Cordeiro passed to Justin Lockhart two plays later. Leading 13–0, the Schive extra point was blocked and returned for a defensive two-point conversion by Tristen Hines. The Eagles followed up with a touchdown of their own, with a 58-yard pass from Tristan Powell to Dylan Drummond setting up a 1-yard Samson Evans rush later in the drive, making the score 13–9 in favor of the Spartans. San Jose State took over after a touchback and were immediately set back by two false start penalties in a row, though a 24-yard pass from Cordeiro to Isaiah Hamilton early in the drive and a 23-yard pass-and-catch by the same pair later in the drive moved the ball into the red zone before the end of the first quarter.

The second quarter began with San Jose State facing 1st & Goal at the Eastern Michigan 6-yard-line, but several plays later they failed to convert 4th & Goal from the 1-yard-line, and turned the ball over on downs to the Eagles, who took advantage of the miscue. On their third play, Powell and Lassiter connected for a 45-yard gain, and Eastern Michigan was able to move the ball inside the 10-yard-line with a 7-yard rush on 3rd & 4 from the San Jose State 11-yard-line. Two plays later, Powell passed to Lassiter on 2nd & Goal for a 1-yard touchdown, giving Eastern Michigan a three-point lead along with the extra point by Jesús Gomez. The Eagles got the ball right back after an interception by Luke Cameron on San Jose State's third play and quickly scored afterwards, with two gains of 13 yards—one pass, one rush—setting up a 3-yard rushing touchdown by Samson Evans to put the Eagles up by ten points. After a 14-yard rush and a 26-yard pass by the Spartans, a pass by Elijah Cooks was intercepted in the end zone by Joshua Scott, giving Eastern Michigan the ball back again. This time, the Eagles drove 80 yards in eight plays, with Evans converting 4th & 1 with a run to the San Jose State 28-yard-line and Powell passing to Lassiter for a touchdown on the next play; following the extra point by Gómez, the Eagles led by 17. San Jose State got the ball back with less than a minute remaining and were able to move the ball to the Eastern Michigan 35-yard-line before the clock ran out and the first half came to a close.

=== Second half ===
The second half started slowly from an offensive standpoint, with Eastern Michigan going three-and-out on their first drive and San Jose State gaining 25 yards on their first play but picking up only three yards combined on their next three plays and punting. Both teams traded three-and-outs after that, and the Eagles got possession to begin their third drive of the half on their own 47-yard-line. Powell passed to Tanner Knue on the drive's first play for a gain of 16 yards and the Eagles gained four yards from there to set up 4th & 6; Gómez converted a 51-yard field goal to push Eastern Michigan's lead to 20 points. The Spartans resumed possession on their own 25-yard-line and earned modest gains before breaking out a 36-yard pass from Cordeiro to Hamilton, which reached the Eastern Michigan 22-yard-line; they scored two plays later on a Cordeiro-to-Nash pass. Their defense performed well and forced a three-and-out and a punt from the Eagles offense, which was fair caught by Hamilton at the San Jose State 35-yard-line. After a 6-yard pass on first down, the Spartans stalled and forced 4th & 1 from their own 44-yard-line, but were unable to convert as Robinson rushed for no gain and possession turned over to Eastern Michigan at that spot. A pair of long gains - a Powell pass to Gunnar Oakes for 19 yards and a 31-yard rush by Jaylon Jackson, the latter for a touchdown - put the Eagles offense back in motion and increased their lead to 21 points. with thirty seconds remaining in the quarter. After getting the ball back, a Cordeiro pass that was called back for holding and a Cordeiro rush that gained 18 yards ended the quarter.

The remainder of San Jose State's drive took up the first four minutes of the fourth quarter: a 14-yard pass from Cordeiro to Cooks advanced the ball into Eagles territory and a pass of the same distance from Cordeiro to Nash converted a third-and-medium later in the drive. Cordeiro connected with Isaac Jernagin for a 6-yard gain later in the drive to convert another third down and enter the red zone, and three plays later the Spartans found the end zone with a 17-yard pass from Cordeiro to Hamilton. The ensuing kickoff was a touchback and the Eagles were able to take over six minutes off of the clock on their drive, with several passes by Powell gaining first downs and Jackson rushes picking up modest yardage. Evans's first carry of the drive came on its ninth play, and it was a 4-yard gain that picked up a first down and moved the ball down to the San Jose State 4-yard-line. After two plays without a yardage gain, Powell passed on third down but was intercepted in the end zone by Michael Dansby for a touchback. Trailing by two possessions, the Spartans were unable to capitalize on the Eastern Michigan turnover. They reached midfield with several Cordeiro passes but Russell Vaden IV's interception and return to the San Jose State 31-yard-line put an end to the drive. With under two minutes remaining, Evans was able to rush three times in order to exhaust San Jose State's two remaining timeouts, before kneeling twice to run out the clock and secure a 41–27 win. The game ended at 5:04 p.m. after a total duration of three hours and 30 minutes.

=== Scoring summary ===
2022 Famous Idaho Potato Bowl

Quarter	1	2	3	4	Total
Eastern Michigan	9	21	11	0	41
San Jose State	13	0	7	7	27

at Albertsons Stadium • Boise, Idaho

- Date: December 20, 2022
- Game time: 1:30 p.m. MST
- Game weather: Cloudy • Temperature: 25 °F (−4 °C) • Wind: none
- Game attendance: 10,122
- Referee: Nate Black
- TV announcers (ESPN): Clay Matvick (play-by-play), Rocky Boiman (analyst), and Dawn Davenport (sideline)
- Box score

Scoring summary

Quarter	Time	Drive			Team	Scoring information	Score	
Quarter	Time	Plays	Yards	TOP	Team	Scoring information	Eastern Michigan	San Jose State
1	13:52	3	59	1:01	San Jose State	Chevan Cordeiro 27-yard touchdown run, Taren Schive kick good	0	7
1	6:36	6	55	2:30	San Jose State	Justin Lockhart 8-yard touchdown reception from Chevan Cordeiro, Taren Schive kick failed (blocked)	0	13
1	6:36				Eastern Michigan	Blocked extra point returned for defensive 2-point conversion by Tristen Hines	2	13
1	3:28	7	74	3:00	Eastern Michigan	Samson Evans 1-yard touchdown run, Jesús Gómez kick good	9	13
2	6:44	13	96	6:20	Eastern Michigan	Darius Lassiter 1-yard touchdown reception from Taylor Powell, Jesús Gómez kick good	16	13
2	4:46	4	29	1:13	Eastern Michigan	Samson Evans 3-yard touchdown run, Jesús Gómez kick good	23	13
2	0:55	8	80	2:30	Eastern Michigan	Darius Lassiter 28-yard touchdown reception from Taylor Powell, Jesús Gómez kick good	30	13
3	8:23	5	20	2:34	Eastern Michigan	51-yard field goal by Jesús Gómez	33	13
3	5:28	6	75	2:55	San Jose State	Nick Nash 17-yard touchdown reception from Chevan Cordeiro, Taren Schive kick good	33	20
3	0:34	4	44	2:14	Eastern Michigan	Jaylon Jackson 31-yard touchdown run, 2-point rush good	41	20
4	10:57	12	75	4:37	San Jose State	Isaiah Hamilton 17-yard touchdown reception from Chevan Cordeiro, Taren Schive kick good	41	27
"TOP" = time of possession. For other American football terms, see Glossary of American football.							41	27

== Statistics ==
Team statistical comparison
Statistic	Eastern Michigan	San Jose State
First downs	22	24
First downs rushing	10	6
First downs passing	11	17
First downs penalty	1	1
Third down efficiency	6–14	5–13
Fourth down efficiency	2–2	1–3
Total plays–net yards	71–416	71–498
Rushing attempts–net yards	41–118	25–132
Yards per rush	2.9	5.3
Yards passing	298	366
Pass completions–attempts	18–30	26–46
Interceptions thrown	1	3
Punt returns–total yards	0–0	0–0
Kickoff returns–total yards	3–38	1–24
Punts–average yardage	4–41.3	2–32.0
Fumbles–lost	2–1	0–0
Penalties–yards	2–30	6–55
Time of possession	33:03	26:57

Eastern Michigan statistics
Eagles passing
	C–A	Yds	TD–INT
Taylor Powell	18–30	298	2–1
Eagles rushing
	Car	Yds	TD
Samson Evans	25	82	2
Jaylon Jackson	7	54	1
TEAM	2	−2	0
Taylor Powell	7	−16	0
Eagles receiving
	Rec	Yds	TD
Darius Lassiter	6	108	2
Dylan Drummond	3	85	0
Tanner Knue	3	40	0
Gunnar Oakes	2	27	0
Hassan Beydoun	2	22	0
Samson Evans	1	10	0
Andreas Paaske	1	6	0

San Jose State statistics
Spartans passing
	C–A	Yds	TD–INT
Chevan Cordeiro	26–44	366	3–2
TEAM	0–1	0	0–0
Elijah Cooks	0–1	0	0–1
Spartans rushing
	Car	Yds	TD
Kairee Robinson	14	56	0
Chevan Cordeiro	9	50	1
Nick Nash	2	26	0
Spartans receiving
	Rec	Yds	TD
Isaiah Hamilton	5	137	1
Elijah Cooks	6	93	0
Nick Nash	4	51	1
Jackson Canaan	1	26	0
Isaac Jernagin	3	19	0
Kairee Robinson	3	17	0
Justin Lockhart	2	12	1
Malikhi Miller	2	11	0

== Aftermath ==
Eastern Michigan's win bumped their overall record in bowl games to 2–5, with both of their wins having come over San Jose State, as well as their first bowl win in 35 years. The Eagles' senior class finished as the winningest class in program history, with respect to regular season games, and the 2022 season was the fourth winning season in the Chris Creighton era.

Eastern Michigan quarterback Taylor Powell was named most valuable player.

San Jose State, who entered the game having committed six turnovers over the course of the regular season, had three during the game; it was the only game of the season in which they committed more than one turnover. This was the second bowl game in three years for the Spartans under Brent Brennan, though with this loss they fell to 0–2 in those games.
