= Austin Ajiake =

American football player (born 2000)

No. 58 – Indianapolis Colts
- Position: Linebacker
- Roster status: Active

Personal information
- Born: June 30, 2000 (age 26); Hayward, California, U.S.
- Listed height: 6 ft 1 in (1.85 m)
- Listed weight: 223 lb (101 kg)

Career information
- High school: Bellarmine College Prep (San Jose, California)
- College: UNLV (2018–2022)
- NFL draft: 2023: undrafted

Career history
- Denver Broncos (2023)*; Las Vegas Raiders (2023)*; Green Bay Packers (2023)*; Indianapolis Colts (2023–present)
- * Offseason or practice squad member only

Awards and highlights
- First-team All-Mountain West (2022)

Career NFL statistics as of Week 10, 2026
- Total tackles: 59
- Sacks: 0.5
- Forced fumbles: 1
- Stats at Pro Football Reference

Austin Ajiake (/ˈɑːdʒikeɪ/, born June 30, 2000) is an American professional football linebacker for the Indianapolis Colts of the National Football League (NFL). He played college football for the UNLV Rebels and was signed by the Denver Broncos as an undrafted free agent in 2023.

== Early life ==
Ajiake was born in Hayward, California and grew up in Fremont. He attended Bellarmine College Preparatory in San Jose, where he was a two-sport athlete, competing in both football and track and field. He is of Nigerian descent.

== College career ==
Ajiake played 10 games in the 2018 season, recording five tackles. He played all 12 games in the 2019 season, recording 14 tackles. He played all six games in the 2020 season, which was abridged due to the COVID-19 pandemic, recording seven tackles. In the 2021 season, Ajiake appeared in only eight games due to injury, though he recorded 74 tackles and earned an honorable mention to the all-Mountain West Conference team.

Ajiake played all 12 games in the 2022 season; his 132 tackles were the fifth-most in the country, and the 4th-most in UNLV school history. He also recorded four sacks, two interceptions, and a fumble recovery. Ajiake was chosen for both the 2022 Hula Bowl and the 2022 East–West Shrine Bowl, and was named to the first-team all-MWC team. Additionally, Ajiake earned the 2022–2023 Mountain West Male Scholar-Athlete of the Year award.

== Professional career ==
Pre-draft measurables
Height	Weight	Arm length	Hand span	Wingspan	40-yard dash	10-yard split	20-yard split	20-yard shuttle	Three-cone drill	Vertical jump	Broad jump	Bench press
6 ft 1 1/2 in (1.87 m)	223 lb (101 kg)	31 5/8 in (0.80 m)	9 1/8 in (0.23 m)	6 ft 4 5/8 in (1.95 m)	4.60 s	1.60 s	2.66 s	4.27 s	7.15 s	38.5 in (0.98 m)	10 ft 3 in (3.12 m)	13 reps
All values from Pro Day

After going undrafted in the 2023 NFL draft, Ajiake agreed to terms with the Carolina Panthers on April 30, 2023, but ultimately did not finalize a contract. On June 16, Ajiake was drafted by the Houston Roughnecks of the XFL, but did not sign with that team either. He signed with the Denver Broncos on August 3, but was released on August 28. The Las Vegas Raiders signed Ajiake to their practice squad on November 1 and released him on November 7. On November 14, the Green Bay Packers signed Ajiake to their practice squad, and released him on December 12. Ajiake tried out for the Buffalo Bills on December 19, but did not sign with the team.

=== Indianapolis Colts ===
The Indianapolis Colts signed Ajiake to their practice squad on December 28, 2023 and on January 9, 2024, the Colts signed him to a reserve/future contract. Ajiake was waived by the Colts on August 27, and re-signed to the practice squad, where he remained for the entirety of the 2024 season.

Ajiake signed a reserve/future contract with Indianapolis on January 6, 2025. On August 26, Ajiake was waived by the Colts as part of final roster cuts and re-signed to the practice squad. He was elevated to the active roster for the Colts' Week 1 game against the Miami Dolphins. He made two tackles in his NFL debut. On September 16, Ajiake was promoted to the active roster.

On January 5, 2026, the Colts signed Ajiake to a one-year contract extension.

== NFL career statistics ==
Year	Team	Games		Tackles				Fumbles				Interceptions					
Year	Team	GP	GS	Comb	Solo	Ast	Sack	FF	FR	Yds	TD	PD	Int	Yds	Avg	Lng	TD
2025	IND	16	0	32	13	19	0.5	0	0	0	0	0	0	0	0.0	0	0
2026	IND	8	1	27	10	17	0.0	1	0	0	0	0	0	0	0.0	0	0
Total		24	1	59	23	36	0.5	1	0	0	0	0	0	0	0.0	0	0
