= JL Skinner =

American football player (born 2001)

JL Skinner III
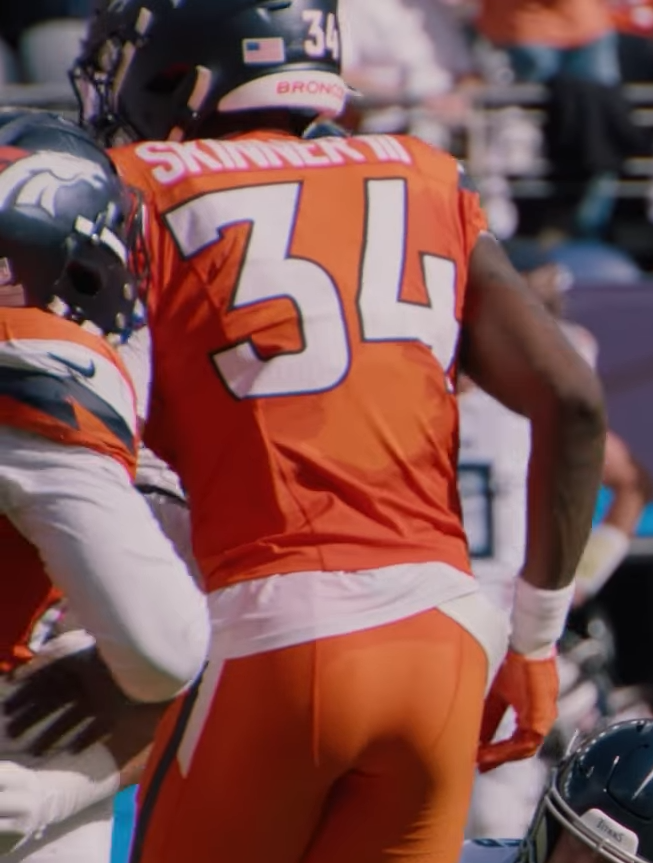
- Skinner with the Denver Broncos in 2025

No. 34 – Denver Broncos
- Positions: Strong safety, special teamer
- Roster status: Active

Personal information
- Born: April 16, 2001 (age 25); San Diego, California, U.S.
- Listed height: 6 ft 4 in (1.93 m)
- Listed weight: 220 lb (100 kg)

Career information
- High school: Point Loma (San Diego)
- College: Boise State (2019–2022)
- NFL draft: 2023: 6th round, 183rd overall pick

Career history
- Denver Broncos (2023–present)

Awards and highlights
- First-team All-Mountain West (2022); Second-team All-Mountain West (2021)

Career NFL statistics as of Week 18, 2025
- Tackles: 21
- Fumble recoveries: 2
- Stats at Pro Football Reference

JL Skinner III (born April 16, 2001) is an American professional football strong safety and special teamer for the Denver Broncos of the National Football League (NFL). He played college football for the Boise State Broncos.

== Early life ==
Skinner was born on April 16, 2001, in San Diego, California. He later attended Point Loma High School.

== College career ==
Skinner played in all 14 of Boise State's games during his freshman season. He started all six of the team's games in a COVID-19-shortened 2020 season and had 37 tackles with one interception. Skinner was named second team All-Mountain West Conference after finishing the season with 92 tackles, seven tackles for loss, two interceptions, three passes defended, and two forced fumbles. He considered entering the 2022 NFL draft, but opted to return to Boise State for his senior season.

== Professional career ==
Pre-draft measurables
Height	Weight	Arm length	Hand span
6 ft 3 3/4 in (1.92 m)	209 lb (95 kg)	32 in (0.81 m)	8 1/4 in (0.21 m)
All values from NFL Combine

Skinner was selected by the Denver Broncos in the sixth round, 183rd overall, of the 2023 NFL draft. As a rookie, he appeared in two games in the 2023 season.

Skinner appeared in all 17 games for Denver during the 2025 campaign, recording one fumble recovery and 12 combined tackles. On February 18, 2026, Skinner revealed that he had dealt with a torn labrum during the season, which ultimately required surgery.
