= Nikko Remigio =

American football player (born 1999)

No. 88 – Houston Texans
- Positions: Wide receiver, return specialist
- Roster status: Active

Personal information
- Born: November 4, 1999 (age 27); Orange, California, U.S.
- Listed height: 5 ft 9 in (1.75 m)
- Listed weight: 187 lb (85 kg)

Career information
- High school: Mater Dei (Santa Ana, California)
- College: California (2018–2021); Fresno State (2022)
- NFL draft: 2023: undrafted

Career history
- Kansas City Chiefs (2023–2026); Houston Texans (2026–present)

Awards and highlights
- Super Bowl champion (LVIII); Second-team All-Mountain West (2022)

Career NFL statistics as of Week 9, 2026
- Rushing yards: 11
- Rushing average: 11.0
- Receptions: 3
- Receiving yards: 69
- Return yards: 1,727
- Stats at Pro Football Reference

Nikko Remigio (born November 4, 1999) is an American professional football wide receiver and return specialist for the Houston Texans of the National Football League (NFL). He played college football for the California Golden Bears and Fresno State Bulldogs.

== Early life ==
Remigio was born on November 4, 1999, in Orange, California, to an American mother of mixed Black and White descent from Pontiac, Michigan, and a father of Filipino descent from Southern California whose family immigrated from the cities of Iloilo and Muntinlupa in the Philippines.

== High school career ==
Remigio attended Mater Dei High School in Santa Ana, California. In three seasons on varsity, he caught 111 passes for 1,695 yards and 19 touchdowns. On June 16, 2017, Remigio committed to play college football for the California Golden Bears over offers from USC and Wisconsin.

== College career ==
Remigio played four seasons at California and made 97 receptions for 903 yards and 13 touchdowns. He also carried the ball 14 times for 75 yards and had 983 return yards and a kickoff return touchdown. Remigio's best season came in 2019 where he played in 12 games, hauling in 38 passes for 513 yards and three touchdowns. He also rushed for eight yards on three carries. After the conclusion of the 2021 season Remigio entered the transfer portal as a graduate transfer.

Remigio transferred to Fresno State in 2022. In his lone season at Fresno State, he made 74 catches for 852 yards and six touchdowns, ran for 42 yards and two touchdowns on six carries, and returned 13 punts for 259 yards and two touchdowns. He earned second-team All-Mountain West Conference honors as a wide receiver and as a punt returner.

== Professional career ==
Pre-draft measurables
Height	Weight	Arm length	Hand span	Wingspan	40-yard dash	10-yard split	20-yard split	20-yard shuttle	Three-cone drill	Vertical jump	Broad jump	Bench press
5 ft 9 in (1.75 m)	187 lb (85 kg)	29 3/4 in (0.76 m)	8 1/2 in (0.22 m)	5 ft 11 5/8 in (1.82 m)	4.56 s	1.57 s	2.61 s	4.33 s	7.20 s	36.0 in (0.91 m)	10 ft 1 in (3.07 m)	19 reps
All values from Pro Day

=== Kansas City Chiefs ===
After not being selected in the 2023 NFL draft, Remigio signed with the Kansas City Chiefs as an undrafted free agent. He was waived/injured on August 29, 2023 and placed on injured reserve. The Chiefs won Super Bowl LVIII against the San Francisco 49ers.

Remigio was waived by the Chiefs on August 27, 2024, and re-signed to the practice squad. On December 7, he was promoted to the active roster. On January 26, 2025, Remigio’s 44-yard punt return helped the Chiefs secure victory in the AFC Championship Game and return to the Super Bowl.

Remigio made 14 appearances for Kansas City during the 2025 season, recording one reception for 21 yards while operating as the team's primary return man. On December 25, 2025, Remigio was placed on season-ending injured reserve due to a knee injury.

On March 10, 2026, Remigio re-signed with the Chiefs. On November 11, he was waived.

=== Houston Texans ===
On November 12, 2026, Remigio was claimed off waivers by the Houston Texans.

== Personal life ==
Remigio has two younger brothers. He is married to Filipino professional track athlete Maureen Schrijvers, who represents the Philippines in the women's 400m dash and 4x400m relay.
