= Jordan Byrd =

American football player (born 2000)

Profile
- Position: Wide receiver / return specialist

Personal information
- Born: April 7, 2000 (age 26); Albuquerque, New Mexico, U.S.
- Listed height: 5 ft 7 in (1.70 m)
- Listed weight: 170 lb (77 kg)

Career information
- High school: Manzano (Albuquerque, New Mexico)
- College: San Diego State (2018–2022)
- NFL draft: 2023: undrafted

Career history
- Pittsburgh Steelers (2023)*; Toronto Argonauts (2024)*; Hamilton Tiger-Cats (2024)
- * Offseason or practice squad member only

Awards and highlights
- 2× first-team All-Mountain West (2021–22); New Mexico Bowl Offensive MVP (2019)
- Stats at Pro Football Reference

Jordan Lamont Byrd (born April 7, 2000) is an American professional football wide receiver. He played college football at San Diego State and signed with the Pittsburgh Steelers after going undrafted in the 2023 NFL draft. He has also been a member of the Toronto Argonauts and Hamilton Tiger-Cats of the CFL.

== College career ==
After being ranked a two-star recruit by Rivals.com, Byrd committed to San Diego State to play football.

== Professional career ==
=== Pittsburgh Steelers ===
Byrd signed with the Pittsburgh Steelers as an undrafted free agent on April 29, 2023. He was waived on August 29. He wore jersey number 16 with the Steelers.

=== Toronto Argonauts ===
Byrd signed with the Toronto Argonauts of the Canadian Football League (CFL) on November 21, 2023, shortly after the team's 2023 season had ended. He played with the team in preseason in 2024, but he was part of the final training camp cuts on June 1, 2024.

=== Hamilton Tiger-Cats ===
Byrd signed to the practice roster of the Hamilton Tiger-Cats of the CFL on August 15, 2024. He was released on September 30, 2024.
