= Jake Haener =

American football player (born 1999)

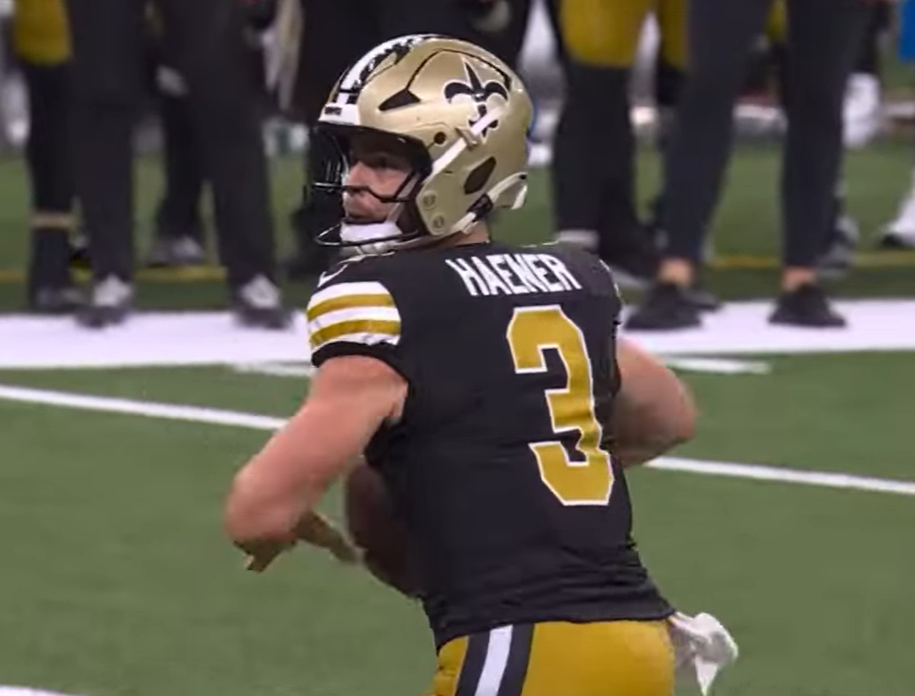
- Haener with the New Orleans Saints in 2024

No. 13 – New York Giants
- Position: Quarterback
- Roster status: Practice squad

Personal information
- Born: March 10, 1999 (age 27); Danville, California, U.S.
- Listed height: 6 ft 1 in (1.85 m)
- Listed weight: 200 lb (91 kg)

Career information
- High school: Monte Vista (Danville, California)
- College: Washington (2017–2018); Fresno State (2019–2022)
- NFL draft: 2023: 4th round, 127th overall pick

Career history
- New Orleans Saints (2023–2025); Kansas City Chiefs (2026)*; New York Giants (2026–present)
- * Offseason or practice squad member only

Awards and highlights
- First-team All-Mountain West (2022); Second-team All-Mountain West (2021)

Career NFL statistics as of 2025
- Passing attempts: 39
- Passing completions: 18
- Completion percentage: 46.2%
- TD–INT: 1–1
- Passing yards: 226
- Passer rating: 62.6
- Stats at Pro Football Reference

Jake Haener (born March 10, 1999) is an American professional football quarterback for the New York Giants of the National Football League (NFL). He played college football for the Washington Huskies and Fresno State Bulldogs. Haener was selected by the New Orleans Saints in the fourth round of the 2023 NFL draft.

== Early life ==
Haener attended Monte Vista High School in Danville, California. During his high school career, he threw for 8,464 yards and a school-record 90 touchdowns. He committed to the University of Washington to play college football.

== College career ==
=== Washington ===
After redshirting his first year at Washington in 2017, Haener appeared in four games as a backup to Jake Browning in 2018, completing 9 of 13 passes for 107 yards with one touchdown and one interception.

=== Fresno State ===
In 2019, Haener transferred to California State University, Fresno. After sitting out his first year at Fresno State due to transfer rules, Haener became the starter in 2020. In six games, he completed 150 of 232 passes for 2,021 yards, 14 touchdowns and five interceptions. He remained the starter in 2021.

On November 30, 2021, Haener entered the NCAA transfer portal. On December 8, Haener withdrew from the transfer portal and returned to Fresno State.

=== Statistics ===
Season	Team	Games			Passing								Rushing			
Season	Team	GP	GS	Record	Comp	Att	Pct	Yards	Avg	TD	Int	Rate	Att	Yards	Avg	TD
2017	Washington	Redshirted (redshirt)														
2018	Washington	3	0	0–0	9	13	69.2	107	8.2	1	1	148.4	1	-9	-9.0	0
2019	Fresno State	Did not play due to transfer rules														
2020	Fresno State	6	6	3–3	150	232	64.7	2,021	8.7	14	5	153.4	57	18	0.3	3
2021	Fresno State	13	13	10–3	329	490	67.1	4,096	8.4	33	9	155.9	71	5	0.1	3
2022	Fresno State	10	10	8–2	252	350	72.0	2,896	8.3	20	3	158.6	46	-123	-2.7	2
Career		32	29	21−8	740	1,085	68.2	9,120	8.4	68	18	156.2	175	-109	-0.6	8

== Professional career ==
Pre-draft measurables
Height	Weight	Arm length	Hand span	Wingspan	Three-cone drill	Vertical jump	Broad jump
5 ft 11 5/8 in (1.82 m)	207 lb (94 kg)	29 3/4 in (0.76 m)	9 3/8 in (0.24 m)	6 ft 1 in (1.85 m)	7.01 s	35.0 in (0.89 m)	9 ft 6 in (2.90 m)
All values from NFL Combine

=== New Orleans Saints ===
Haener was selected by the New Orleans Saints in the fourth round (127th overall) of the 2023 NFL draft.

Haener made the initial opening roster for the Saints to start the 2023 season. However, in early September, it was revealed he failed a drug test earlier that summer, testing positive for a banned performance enhancing substance. Haener was suspended the first six weeks of the season. He released a statement: "I still do not know how the substance got into my body, as none of my supplements or prescribed medications contain the banned ingredient", nonetheless subsequently stating "I must take full responsibility for the failed test".

Haener began the 2024 campaign as the backup quarterback behind Derek Carr. In Week 7 against the Denver Broncos, he relieved Spencer Rattler on the final drive of the game, and recorded his first career touchdown on a 12–yard pass to Cedrick Wilson Jr. After Carr suffered a hand fracture in Week 14, the Saints named Haener their starting quarterback.

The Saints waived Haener on August 26, 2025, after Rattler was named the starter to begin the 2025 season. He was then signed to the practice squad the next day. On September 2, Haener was signed to the active roster, but was waived four days later. Haener was re-signed to New Orleans' practice squad for a second time on September 9.

=== Kansas City Chiefs ===
On February 2, 2026, Haener signed a reserve/future contract with the Kansas City Chiefs. On May 4, Haener was waived by the Chiefs following multiple undrafted free agent signings.

=== New York Giants ===
On August 17, 2026, Haener signed with the Giants. He was waived by New York as a part of final roster cuts on August 30; he was re-signed to the team's practice squad the following day. On September 26, Haener was signed to the active roster following an injury to starting quarterback Jaxson Dart. On September 28, Haener was waived and then re-signed to the practice squad shortly after J. J. McCarthy was acquired by the Giants. On October 7, he was signed back to the active roster. On November 5, Haener was waived and re-signed to the practice squad.

== NFL career statistics ==
Year	Team	Games			Passing									Rushing					Sacked		Fumbles	
Year	Team	GP	GS	Record	Cmp	Att	Pct	Yds	Y/A	Lng	TD	Int	Rtg	Att	Yds	Y/A	Lng	TD	Sck	SckY	Fum	Lost
2023	NO	0	0	—	DNP																	
2024	NO	8	1	0–1	18	39	46.2	226	5.8	36	1	1	62.6	11	22	2.0	9	0	6	55	0	0
2025	NO	0	0	—	DNP																	
Career		9	1	0–1	18	39	46.2	226	5.8	36	1	1	62.6	11	22	2.0	9	0	6	55	0	0

== Personal life ==
His mother, Julie Haener, was an anchor at KTVU-TV in Oakland from 1997 to 2024 and was an anchor in Fresno in the early 1990s.

On July 26, 2024, Haener announced that he had been diagnosed with skin cancer.
