= A. J. Haulcy =

American football player (born 2004)

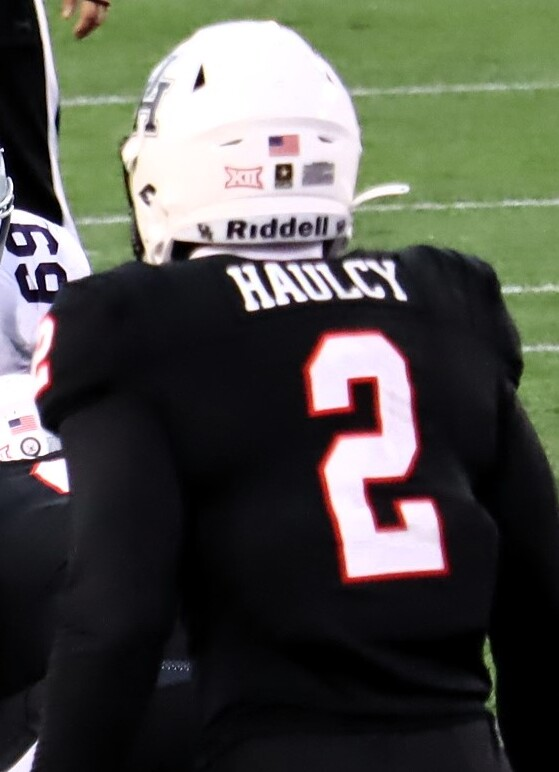

No. 25 – Indianapolis Colts
- Position: Safety
- Roster status: Active

Personal information
- Born: January 10, 2004 (age 22)
- Listed height: 6 ft 0 in (1.83 m)
- Listed weight: 215 lb (98 kg)

Career information
- High school: Thurgood Marshall (Missouri City, Texas)
- College: New Mexico (2022); Houston (2023–2024); LSU (2025)
- NFL draft: 2026: 3rd round, 78th overall pick

Career history
- Indianapolis Colts (2026–present)

Awards and highlights
- First-team All-American (2025); First-team All-SEC (2025); First-team All-Big 12 (2024); Second-team All-Mountain West (2022)

Career NFL statistics as of Week 7, 2026
- Tackles: 36
- Pass deflections: 2
- Stats at Pro Football Reference

Adari "A. J." Haulcy (born January 10, 2004) is an American professional football safety for the Indianapolis Colts of the National Football League (NFL). He played college football for the LSU Tigers, the New Mexico Lobos and the Houston Cougars. Haulcy was selected by the Colts in the third round of the 2026 NFL draft.

== Early life ==
Haulcy grew up in Missouri City, Texas and attended Thurgood Marshall High School. He was rated a three-star recruit and committed to play college football at New Mexico over offers from Houston Christian, Incarnate Word, Kansas, Louisiana, Southeastern Louisiana and Texas Southern.

== College career ==
=== New Mexico ===
During Haulcy's true freshman season in 2022, he played in all 12 games and started the last nine of them. He finished the season with 87 total tackles, 38 solo stops, 49 assisted tackles, three tackles for loss, two forced fumbles and two interceptions. Haulcy was also named to the Pro Football Focus True Freshman All-America team which makes him the first ever player from New Mexico to receive the honor.

On December 8, 2022, Haulcy announced that he would be entering the transfer portal. On December 31, 2022, he announced that he would be transferring to Houston.

=== Houston ===
During the 2023 season, Haulcy made his debut game at Houston in the Week 1 game against UTSA where he completed 5 tackles and 3 solo stops. On April 19, 2025, Haulcy announced that he would be entering the transfer portal for a second time.

=== LSU ===
After a heated battle between LSU and Miami, Haulcy announced his commitment to LSU on May 4, 2025.

== Professional career ==
Pre-draft measurables
Height	Weight	Arm length	Hand span	Wingspan	40-yard dash	10-yard split	20-yard split
5 ft 11 5/8 in (1.82 m)	215 lb (98 kg)	30 7/8 in (0.78 m)	9 1/4 in (0.23 m)	6 ft 3 3/8 in (1.91 m)	4.52 s	1.62 s	2.65 s
All values from NFL Combine

Haulcy was selected by the Indianapolis Colts in the third round with the 78th overall pick of the 2026 NFL draft. He signed his rookie contract on May 8.
