= Michael Dansby (offensive lineman) =

American football player (born 1983)

No. 70
- Position: Offensive tackle

Personal information
- Born: June 30, 1983 (age 43); Birmingham, Alabama, U.S.
- Listed height: 6 ft 4 in (1.93 m)
- Listed weight: 312 lb (142 kg)

Career information
- College: Jackson State
- NFL draft: 2006: undrafted

Career history
- Arkansas Twisters (2007); Iowa Barnstormers (2008–2010)

Career AFL statistics
- Tackles: 5.5
- Stats at ArenaFan.com

Michael Dansby (born June 30, 1983) is an American former football offensive lineman. He attended Jackson State. In 2007, Michael made his pro debut for the Arkansas Twisters of the af2 under head coach John Gregory. In 2008 Dansby signed with the Iowa Barnstormers. He has been named the Barnstormers "Linemen of the Year" for three years in a row (2008–2010).
