= Cade Hall =

American football player (born 2000)

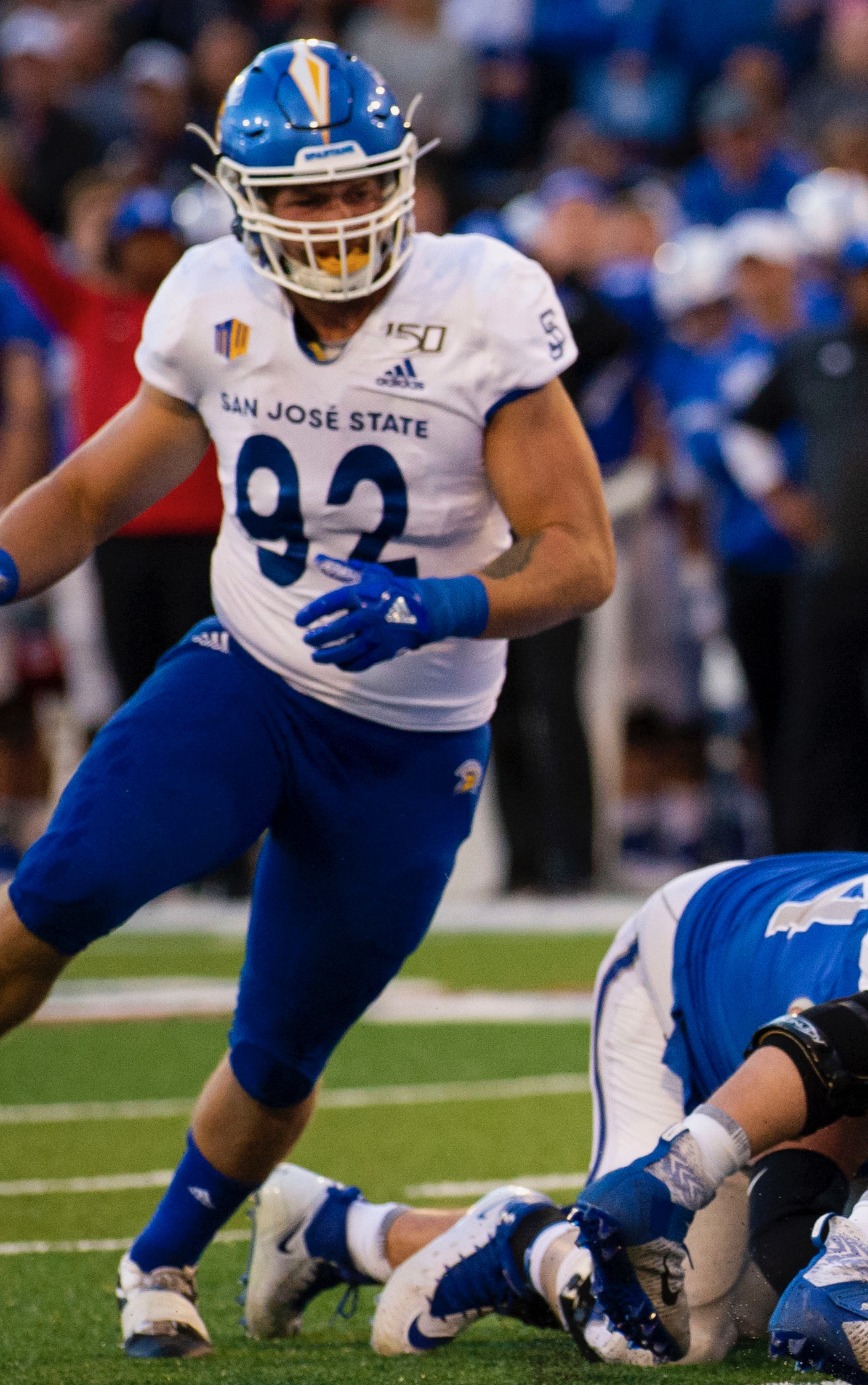
- Hall with San Jose State in 2019

No. 92
- Position: Defensive end

Personal information
- Born: February 25, 2000 (age 26); San Jose, California, U.S.
- Listed height: 6 ft 2 in (1.88 m)
- Listed weight: 260 lb (118 kg)

Career information
- High school: Bellarmine Prep (San Jose, California)
- College: San Jose State (2018–2022)

Awards and highlights
- MW Defensive Player of the Year (2020); 2× First-team All-MW (2020, 2022)
- Stats at ESPN

Cade Rhett Hall (born February 25, 2000) is an American former college football defensive end who played for the San Jose State Spartans. 2020, the Spartans won the Mountain West Conference Championship Game, and Hall was the Mountain West Defensive Player of the Year after the season.

== Early life ==
Born in San Jose, Hall grew up in Morgan Hill, California, and graduated from Bellarmine College Preparatory in San Jose in 2018.

== College career ==
Hall became a starter during his freshman season and finished the season with 41 tackles, 4.5 tackles for loss and a team-high three sacks. As a sophomore, he recorded 39 tackles with one sack and two forced fumbles and led the team with eight tackles for loss. Hall was named the Mountain West Conference Defensive Player of the Year and a first team All-American by Sporting News after recording 10.0 sacks and 12.0 tackles for loss. However, Hall and numerous other San Jose State starters were unable to play in the 2020 Arizona Bowl.

In his redshirt senior year of 2022, Hall had 184 tackles including 42 for loss, 7.5 sacks, six forced fumbles, two fumble recoveries, two pass deflections, and an interception. He earned first-team All-Mountain West that year and was the Mountain West's preseason co-Defensive Player of the Year. In five seasons, he played 55 games, a new San Jose State record. His 25.5 career sacks were fourth most in San Jose State history.

In December 2022, Hall graduated from San Jose State with a bachelor's degree in communication studies. After his college football career ended, Hall retired from football instead of entering the 2023 NFL draft; while he was projected as a potential late-round draft pick, he expressed concern about football's health risks and the dangers of head injuries. San Jose State head coach Brent Brennan described Hall as "probably the first and only player I've ever had who had a real shot at making the NFL, then decided to walk away."

== Personal life ==
Hall is the son of former NFL defensive lineman Rhett Hall.

After retiring from football, Hall became a house renovator in Orange County, California, along with his wife Abby.
