= Viliami Fehoko =

American football player (born 1999)

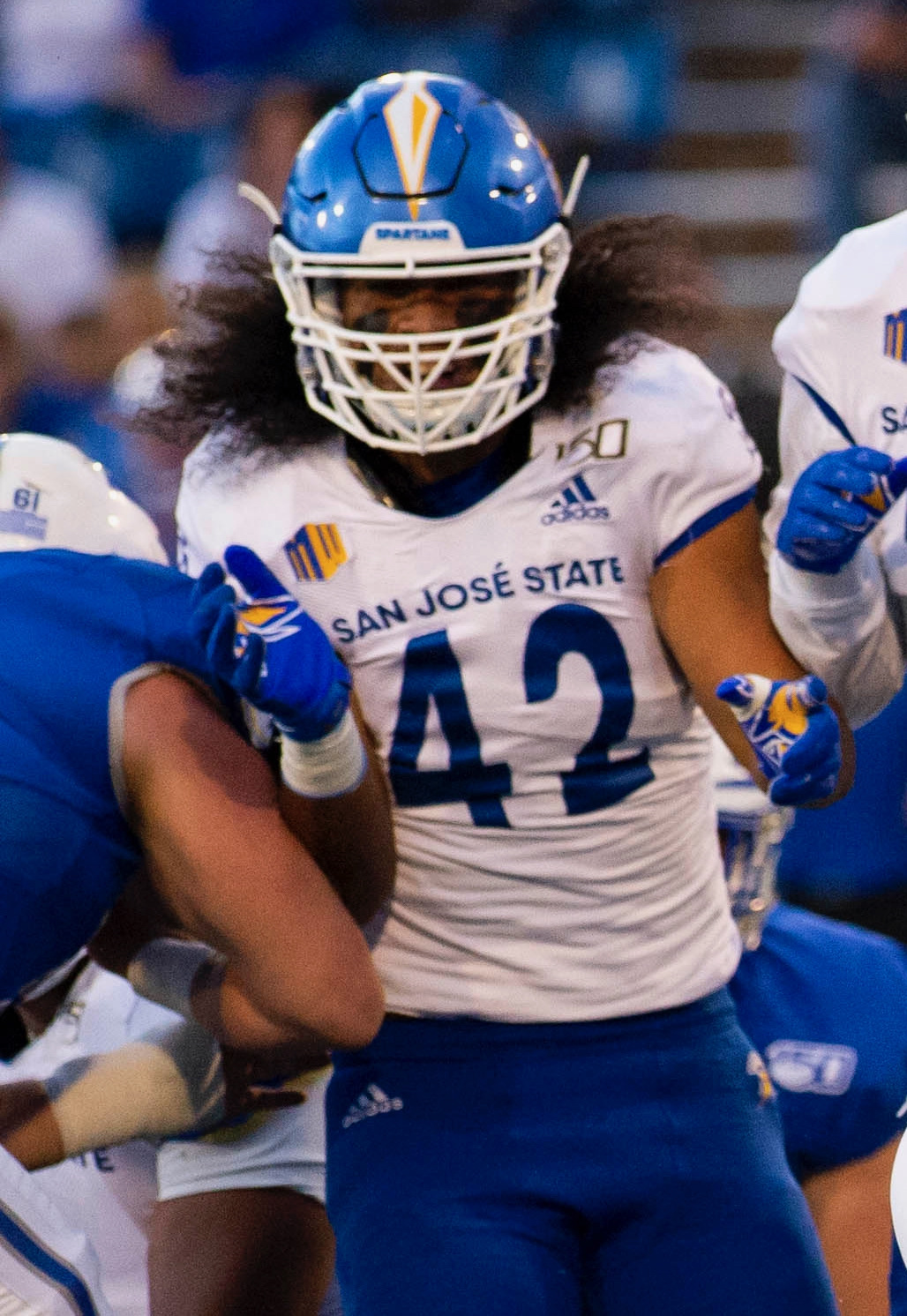
- Fehoko with the San Jose State Spartans in 2019

No. 63 – San Francisco 49ers
- Position: Defensive tackle
- Roster status: Practice squad

Personal information
- Born: December 16, 1999 (age 26); Stanford, California, U.S.
- Listed height: 6 ft 4 in (1.93 m)
- Listed weight: 267 lb (121 kg)

Career information
- High school: Saint Francis (Mountain View, California)
- College: San Jose State (2018–2022)
- NFL draft: 2023: 4th round, 129th overall pick

Career history
- Dallas Cowboys (2023); Washington Commanders (2024)*; Indianapolis Colts (2025)*; San Francisco 49ers (2026–present)
- * Offseason or practice squad member only

Awards and highlights
- MW Defensive Player of the Year (2022); 3× first-team All-MW (2020–2022)

Career NFL statistics as of Week 3, 2026
- Games played: 1
- Stats at Pro Football Reference

Viliami Taopa Fehoko Jr. (born December 16, 1999) is an American professional football defensive tackle for the San Francisco 49ers of the National Football League (NFL). He played college football for the San Jose State Spartans and was named the 2022 Mountain West Defensive Player of the Year. Fehoko was selected by the Dallas Cowboys in the fourth round of the 2023 NFL draft and has also played for the Washington Commanders.

== Early life ==
Fehoko was born on December 16, 1999, in Stanford, California, and raised in East Palo Alto, California. He attended Saint Francis High School, where he played as a tight end for their football team. As a senior, he received All-West Coast Athletic League, Bay Area News Group first-team All-Bay Area and San Francisco Chronicle honorable-mention All-Metro honors.

He also was part of the East Palo Alto Razorbacks rugby club. On February 3, 2018, Fehoko committed to San Jose State University.

== College career ==
As a true freshman in 2018, he was converted from a tight end into a defensive end. He appeared in 4 conference games, before being redshirted. He tallied 5 tackles, with three coming against the University of Wyoming.

As a redshirt freshman in 2019, he was named the starter at left defensive end, recording 44 tackles (3 for loss), one sack, and 4 pass deflections (tied for second on the team).

As a sophomore in 2020, the season was reduced to 8 games because of the COVID-19 pandemic. He started all 8 games, collecting 36 tackles (fifth on the team), 12.5 tackles for loss (led the conference), 6 sacks (second on the team), one pass deflection, and one fumble recovered. He had 6 tackles (2 for loss) and one sack against the University of New Mexico. He was named first-team All-Mountain West for the first time in his career.

As a junior in 2021, he started all 12 games, registering 37 tackles, 10.5 tackles for loss (led the team), 6 sacks (led the team), 3 forced fumbles (led the team), and deflected six passes. He had 7 tackles against the University of Wyoming. He was named first-team All-Mountain West for the second time.

As a senior in 2022, he started in all 12 games, posting a career-high 69 tackles (third on the team), 19 tackles for loss (fifth in the nation), 9 sacks (led the team), two forced fumbles, one fumble recovery, and one deflected pass. He had 7 tackles (3 for loss), one sack, one forced fumble and one fumble recovery against Fresno State University. He made 12 tackles (4.5 for loss), 2 sacks and one forced fumble against the University of Nevada. He had 5 tackles (3 for loss) and two sacks against Colorado State University. He was named the Mountain West Defensive Player of the Year and first-team All-Mountain West for the third straight year.

He finished his career with 191 tackles, 46 tackles for loss (second in school history), 23 sacks (fifth in school history), 14 pass deflections, 5 forced fumbles and 2 fumble recoveries in 48 games played.

== Professional career ==
Pre-draft measurables
Height	Weight	Arm length	Hand span	Wingspan	40-yard dash	10-yard split	20-yard split	20-yard shuttle	Three-cone drill	Vertical jump	Broad jump	Bench press
6 ft 3 3/4 in (1.92 m)	276 lb (125 kg)	33 in (0.84 m)	9 in (0.23 m)	6 ft 5 3/8 in (1.97 m)	4.77 s	1.68 s	2.75 s	4.73 s	7.32 s	30.0 in (0.76 m)	8 ft 4 in (2.54 m)	24 reps
All values from NFL Combine/Pro Day

=== Dallas Cowboys ===
Fehoko was selected by the Dallas Cowboys in the fourth round (129th overall) of the 2023 NFL draft. In training camp, he was tried at defensive tackle, but struggled with a shoulder injury that forced him to miss the preseason opener against the Jacksonville Jaguars. He was placed on injured reserve with a knee injury on November 18, 2023. He was activated on January 3, 2024. He didn't play a single snap in the regular season, spending 10 games on the inactive list and 7 on injured reserve.

In 2024, he began training camp at defensive tackle, but was switched back to defensive end before the start of the preseason games. He couldn't move up on the depth chart despite the fact that the Cowboys lost defensive ends Dorance Armstrong and Dante Fowler Jr. in free agency. Fehoko was waived by the Cowboys with an injury designation on August 26, 2024. He was waived from the injured reserve on September 3, 2024.

=== Washington Commanders ===
On November 26, 2024, Fehoko signed with the practice squad of the Washington Commanders. He reunited with head coach Dan Quinn, who was the defensive coordinator with the Cowboys.

On January 28, 2025, he signed a reserve/future contract with the Commanders. Fehoko was waived/injured on August 11, and reverted to injured reserve the following day after going unclaimed. He was released with an injury settlement a week later.

=== Indianapolis Colts ===
On November 18, 2025, Fehoko signed with the Indianapolis Colts' practice squad. He signed a reserve/future contract with Indianapolis on January 5, 2026.

On April 30, 2026, Fehoko was waived by the Colts.

=== San Francisco 49ers ===
On August 24, 2026, Fehoko was signed by the San Francisco 49ers. On August 30, he was waived by the 49ers as a part of final roster cuts. On September 23, San Francisco re–signed Fehoko to their practice squad. Three days later, he was promoted to the active roster. He was waived on October 3 and re-signed to the practice squad three days later.

== Personal life ==
Fehoko is a second cousin of Vita Vea. He speaks Tongan and can communicate in sign language.
