= 2023 XFL rookie draft =

2023 American football player draft

General information
- Date: June 16, 2023
- Time: 11:00 AM ET

Overview
- League: XFL

The 2023 XFL rookie draft was the player selection process to fill the rosters of the eight teams for the 2024 XFL season, and the only rookie draft in the rebooted version of the XFL's history.

The draft was held on June 16, 2023, with results released through the XFL's social media channels later that evening, with 80 players being selected.

== Eligibility ==
The XFL 2023 "rookie" draft pool consisted only player who were eligible to have been drafted in the 2023 NFL draft and who are not under contract by a professional football team (players under contract with Indoor Football League are eligible to be drafted).

Drafted rookies will be placed on XFL rosters with players who finished the 2023 season on active and reserve lists and teams will hold exclusive rights with the players they select in the draft.

== Selection order ==
The draft was to consist up to 10 rounds. XFL team rosters will be expanded from 51 to 90 players to allow for the increased number of players.

The selection order was follows (the selection order for subsequent rounds followed the order of the first round):

Selection	Team	2023 record	Playoff result
1	Orlando Guardians	1-9	Did not qualify
2	Vegas Vipers	2-8	Did not qualify
3	San Antonio Brahmas	3-7	Did not qualify
4	St. Louis Battlehawks	7-3	Did not qualify
5	Seattle Sea Dragons	7-3	Div Championship
6	Houston Roughnecks	7-3	Div Championship
7	DC Defenders	9-1	Lost Championship
8	Arlington Renegades	4-6	Won Championship

Before the draft, the Renegades and Sea Dragons complete a trade, with Arlington receiving linebacker Tuzar Skipper and the 46th overall pick and Seattle receives offensive lineman George Moore and the 40th overall pick.

== Draft results ==
On the evening of the event, the XFL announced that the following 80 players were selected in the rookie draft. The league didn't published selection order and just announced the selections in alphabetical order by team.

=== Arlington Renegades ===
Player	Position	College
Sy Barnett	WR	Davenport
Connor Degenhardt	QB	New Haven
Ami Finau	DL	Maryland
Jalen Green	DB	Mississippi State
Charles Hall	WR	Arizona State
James Jackson	OL	South Alabama
Jordan Rhodes	OL	Arkansas State
Merlin Robertson	LB	Arizona State
Chris Whittaker	LB	Incarnate Word
Jordan Wright	LB	Kentucky

=== DC Defenders ===
Player	Position	College
Paxton Brooks	P	Tennessee
Matt Carrick	OL	Michigan State
Alex Jensen	OL	South Dakota
C. J. Johnson	WR	East Carolina
Kaleb Oliver	LB	Western Kentucky
Jack Plumb	OL	Iowa
Bentlee Sanders	DB	Nevada
Mohamed Sanogo	LB	Louisville
Ty Scott	WR	Missouri State
Trea Shropshire	WR	UAB

=== Houston Roughnecks ===
Player	Position	College
Jayson Ademilola	DL	Notre Dame
Austin Ajiake	LB	UNLV
Michael Ayers	LB	Ashland
Quinton Barrow	DB	Grand Valley State
Momar Fall	DL	Colorado State Pueblo
Ahofitu Maka	OL	UTSA
Alijah McGhee	DB	Minnesota State-Mankato
Marcus Minor	OL	Pittsburgh
Marvin Pierre	LB	Kent State
Lindsey Scott Jr.	QB	Incarnate Word

=== Orlando Guardians ===
Player	Position	College
Jeremy Cooper	OL	Cincinnati
Kosi Eldridge	LB	Texas Tech
Terry Hampton	DL	Arkansas
K.D. Hill	DL	Ole Miss
Jarrett Horst	OL	Michigan State
Darius Joiner	DB	Duke
Jacquez Jones	LB	Kentucky
Keyron Kinsler	DB	Alcorn State
Brock Martin	DL	Oklahoma State
Laquinston Sharp	OL	Mississippi State

=== San Antonio Brahmas ===
Player	Position	College
Jahleel Billingsley	TE	Texas
Brendan Bordner	OL	Florida Atlantic
Carlos Carriere	WR	Central Michigan
Darrious Gaines	DB	Western Colorado
R.J. Hubert	DB	Utah
Lorenzo McCaskill	LB	Kansas
Dylan O'Quinn	OL	Cincinnati
J.C. Santana	WR	Tulsa
Chris Smith	RB	Louisiana
Dillon Thomas	DB	Missouri State

=== Seattle Sea Dragons ===
Player	Position	College
Sam Burt	DL	Kansas
Des Holmes	OL	Arizona State
Malcolm Lee	DL	Kansas
Wes Moeai	DL	Rocky Mountain
Colby Reeder	LB	Iowa State
Titus Swen	RB	Wyoming
Destin Talbert	DB	North Dakota State
Chad Townsend	WR	Texas Tech
Jazston Turnetine	OL	Florida State
Payton Wilgar	LB	BYU

=== St. Louis Battlehawks ===
Player	Position	College
Nico Bolden	DB	Kent State
James Bostic	RB	Ohio
Johnny Buchanan	LB	Delaware
Darion Chafin	WR	Incarnate Word
Jaocb Gall	OL	Baylor
Kemore Gamble	TE	UCF
Matthew Jester	DL	Princeton
Kevo Latulas	RB	Missouri State
Jadrian Taylor	DL	UTEP
Anthony Witherstone	DB	Merrimack

=== Vegas Vipers ===
Player	Position	College
Nick Amoah	OL	UC Davis
Desmond Bessent	OL	Buffalo
Dwayne Boyles	LB	South Florida
Stacy Chukwumezie	WR	Northern Arizona
Jamare Edwards	DL	James Madison
Lorenzo Fauatea	DL	BYU
T.J. Green	RB	Liberty
Robert Mitchell	OL	North Carolina Central
Darrius Nash	DB	Utah Tech
Naasir Watkins	OL	Liberty

== Undrafted players ==
On June 20, the XFL announced that the rights to 44 undrafted players have been claimed by teams.

=== Arlington Renegades ===
Player	Position	College
Tyrell Aijan	DB	Kentucky
Connor Blumrick	QB	Virginia Tech
Noah Henderson	OL	East Carolina
Ike Irabor	RB	Union
Todd Simmons	WR	Dubuque
Noah Taylor	LB	North Carolina

=== DC Defenders ===
Player	Position	College
Adonis Boone	OL	Louisville
Jahlil Brown	DB	Central Connecticut State
Warren Ericson	OL	Georgia
Josh Falo	TE	USC

=== Houston Roughnecks ===
Player	Position	College
Isaiah Bowser	RB	UCF
Cody Chrest	WR	Sam Houston State
Christian Ealey	OL	Kentucky Wesleyan
Dalton Godfrey	LS	South Dakota
Braydon Johnson	WR	Oklahoma State
Destin Mack	DB	The Citadel
Christian Morgan	DB	Baylor

=== Orlando Guardians ===
Player	Position	College
Bo Bauer	LB	Notre Dame
Daetrich Harrington	RB	Appalachian State
Stacey Marshall	WR	Marshall
Shea Pitts	DB	UCLA
Zane Pope	WR	Fresno State
Tre'Mond Shorts	OL	LSU
Bryson Speas	OL	North Carolina State

=== San Antonio Brahmas ===
Player	Position	College
Luke Ford	WR	Illinois
Micahh Smith	DB	Incarnate Word
Nazier Wright	LB	William Paterson

=== Seattle Sea Dragons ===
Player	Position	College
Dillon Doyle	LB	Baylor
Beau Kelly	WR	Portland State
Luke Loecher	P	Oregon State
N'Kosi Perry	QB	Florida Atlantic
Morgan Vest	DB	Northern Arizona
Dawson Weber	DB	North Dakota State
Lazarius Williams	DL	New Mexico State

=== St. Louis Battlehawks ===
Player	Position	College
Kemari Averett	WR	Bethune–Cookman
Eric Black	DL	Stony Brook
Aidan Borguet	RB	Harvard
Marcus Cushnie	LB	UMass
Jaylen Hall	WR	Western Kentucky
Dom Peterson	DL	Nevada
Justin Ragin	DL	Jackson State

=== Vegas Vipers ===
Player	Position	College
Trey Cobb	LB	Appalachian State
Alfred Edwards	OL	Utah State
Victor Jones	DL	Akron

Other undrafted players were invited to XFL player showcases, with a chance to exhibit their skills in front of XFL coaches and personnel directors. Players were evaluated based on performance for inclusion in the XFL player pool for the upcoming 2024 season. The top performers were invited to the XFL Combine, which was held July 25–27 in Arlington, Texas.
