= Kyle Harmon (American football) =

American football linebacker (born 1999)

No. 45
- Position: Linebacker

Personal information
- Born: March 2, 1999 (age 27); Antioch, California, U.S.
- Listed height: 6 ft 0 in (1.83 m)
- Listed weight: 225 lb (102 kg)

Career information
- High school: Freedom (CA)
- College: San Jose State (2018–2022)

Awards and highlights
- First-team All-MWC (2022)
- Stats at ESPN

Kyle Harmon (born March 2, 1999) is an American former football linebacker. He played college football for the San Jose State Spartans. He ranked second nationally in tackles during the 2021 season.

== Early life ==
Harmon grew up in Walnut Creek, California. His father, Kevin Harmon, played football at Weber State, but died of congestive heart failure when Kyle was a freshman in high school. Kyle attended Freedom High School in Oakley, California. While at Freedom, he tallied 405 tackles and was twice named Defensive Player of the Year in the Bay Valley Athletic League.

== College football ==
Harmon originally committed to play college football for Cal Poly San Luis Obispo. He withdrew that commitment in January 2017 and committed to the University of California. One week before the 2017 season opener, he left the Cal program. He initially announced plans to enroll at Cal Poly in January 2018. Instead, he enrolled at San Jose State University and has played college football there since 2018.

As a senior in 2021, he tallied 133 tackles (72 unassisted, 61 assisted), the second highest total among all college football players. Having an additional year of eligibility, Harmon returned to San Jose State as a graduate student in 2022. In July 2022, he was named to the Butkus Award watch list.
