= Michael Dansby (cornerback) =

American football player (born 2004)

No. 37 – Seattle Seahawks
- Position: Cornerback
- Roster status: Practice squad

Personal information
- Born: July 22, 2004 (age 22)
- Listed height: 5 ft 11 in (1.80 m)
- Listed weight: 185 lb (84 kg)

Career information
- High school: McClymonds (Oakland, California)
- College: San Jose State (2022–2024); Arizona (2025)
- NFL draft: 2026: 7th round, 255th overall pick

Career history
- Seattle Seahawks (2026–present)*
- * Offseason or practice squad member only
- Stats at Pro Football Reference

Michael Dansby (born July 22, 2004) is an American professional football cornerback for the Seattle Seahawks of the National Football League (NFL). He played college football for the San Jose State Spartans and Arizona Wildcats and was selected by the Seahawks in the seventh round of the 2026 NFL draft.

== Early life ==
Dansby is from Oakland, California. He attended Oakland High School before transferring to McClymonds High School, playing football as a wide receiver and defensive back. He was a first-team all-metro performer at wide receiver. Dansby also competed in track and field, placing first in the 100 metres at the district championship. After high school, he committed to play college football for the San Jose Spartans as a defensive back.

== College career ==
As a true freshman at San Jose State in 2022, Dansby posted 18 tackles, four pass deflections and two interceptions. He then totaled 15 tackles, one tackle-for-loss (TFL), four pass breakups and an interception in 2023. In 2024, Dansby totaled 37 tackles, seven pass breakups and two interceptions. He transferred to the Arizona Wildcats for his senior season in 2025, joining head coach Brent Brennan and cornerbacks coach Chip Viney, whom he had played under at San Jose State. In his only year with Arizona, he led the team with 10 pass breakups and also had 19 tackles and two interceptions.

== Professional career ==
Pre-draft measurables
| Height | Weight | Arm length | Hand span | Wingspan |
|---|---|---|---|---|
| 5 ft 11 1/2 in (1.82 m) | 185 lb (84 kg) | 30 1/2 in (0.77 m) | 9 1/4 in (0.23 m) | 6 ft 2 in (1.88 m) |
All values from Pro Day

Dansby was selected by the Seattle Seahawks in the seventh round (255th overall) of the 2026 NFL draft. He was waived by the Seahawks on August 30, 2026, as a part of final roster cuts, and re-signed a day later to the practice squad.
