= 2023 Nevada Wolf Pack football team =

American college football season

2023 Nevada Wolf Pack football
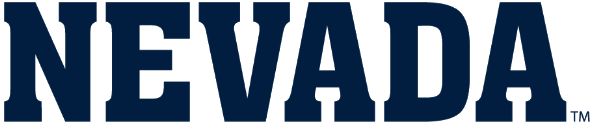
- Conference: Mountain West Conference
- Record: 2–10 (2–6 MW)
- Head coach: Ken Wilson (2nd season)
- Offensive coordinator: Derek Sage (2nd season)
- Offensive scheme: Multiple
- Co-defensive coordinators: Kwame Agyeman (2nd season); Mike Bethea (2nd season)
- Base defense: 4–2–5
- Home stadium: Mackay Stadium

2023 Mountain West Conference football standings
	Conf.			Overall
Team	W		L	W		L
UNLV y	6	–	2	9	–	5
Boise State y$	6	–	2	8	–	6
San Jose State	6	–	2	7	–	6
Air Force	5	–	3	9	–	4
Wyoming	5	–	3	9	–	4
Fresno State	4	–	4	9	–	4
Utah State	4	–	4	6	–	7
Hawaii	3	–	5	5	–	8
Colorado State	3	–	5	5	–	7
Nevada	2	–	6	2	–	10
New Mexico	2	–	6	4	–	8
San Diego State	2	–	6	4	–	8
Championship: Boise State 44, UNLV 20
$ – Conference champion; y – Championship game participant

The 2023 Nevada Wolf Pack football team represented the University of Nevada, Reno as a member of the Mountain West Conference during the 2023 NCAA Division I FBS football season. The Wolf Pack were led by Ken Wilson in his second year as Nevada's head coach. They played their home games at Mackay Stadium in Reno, Nevada. Wilson was fired a week after the season ended. The Nevada Wolf Pack football team drew an average home attendance of 16,998 in 2023.

== Schedule ==
Date	Time	Opponent	Site	TV	Result	Attendance
September 2	3:30 p.m.	at No. 6 USC*	LA Memorial Coliseum; Los Angeles, CA	P12N	L 14–66	62,916
September 9	4:00 p.m.	No. 7 (FCS) Idaho*	Mackay Stadium; Reno, NV	KNSN-TV	L 6–33	19,852
September 16	7:30 p.m.	Kansas*	Mackay Stadium; Reno, NV	CBSSN	L 24–31	16,890
September 23	4:00 p.m.	at Texas State*	Bobcat Stadium; San Marcos, TX	ESPN+	L 24–35	19,257
September 30	7:30 p.m.	at No. 25 Fresno State	Valley Children's Stadium; Fresno, CA	FS1	L 9–27	39,246
October 14	2:00 p.m.	UNLV	Mackay Stadium; Reno, NV (Fremont Cannon)	KNSN-TV	L 27–45	24,578
October 21	6:00 p.m.	at San Diego State	Snapdragon Stadium; San Diego, CA	FS2	W 6–0	27,122
October 28	7:30 p.m.	New Mexico^{†}	Mackay Stadium; Reno, NV	CBSSN	W 34–24	13,083
November 4	1:00 p.m.	Hawaii	Mackay Stadium; Reno, NV	SPEC PPV	L 14–27	15,540
November 11	12:00 p.m.	at Utah State	Maverik Stadium; Logan, UT	MW Network	L 24–41	17,760
November 18	12:00 p.m.	at Colorado State	Canvas Stadium; Fort Collins, CO	MW Network	L 20–30	20,121
November 25	6:00 p.m.	Wyoming	Mackay Stadium; Reno, NV	CBSSN	L 6–42	12,044
*Non-conference game; ^{†}Homecoming; Rankings from Coaches' Poll released prior to the game; All times are in Pacific time

== Roster ==
2023 Nevada Wolf Pack football team roster
Players
Coaches
Offense

Pos.	#	Name	Class
RB	0	Cross Patton	Sr
WR	1	Isaah Crocker	GS
QB	2	Brendon Lewis	So
WR	3	Jamaal Bell	Sr
RB	4	Sean Dollars	Jr
WR	5	Dalevon Campbell	GS
WR	6	Gerick Robinson	So
WR	7	Marquis Ashley	So
WR	9	Marshaun Brown	Fr
QB	10	A. J. Bianco	Fr
WR	11	Carlos Sandy	GS
WR	12	Nate Burleson II	Fr
QB	13	Jax Leatherwood	Fr
WR	14	John Jackson III	GS
WR	15	Kola Babalola	Fr
QB	16	Shane Illingworth	Jr
QB	17	Baylor Horning	Sr
QB	18	Spencer Curtis	Sr
QB	19	Logan Howren	Fr
RB	22	Jeshua Fixel	Sr
RB	23	Jacques Badalato-Birdsell	So
WR	24	Christo Viloria	Fr
RB	26	Ashton Hayes	So
RB	32	Wesley Kommer	Jr
RB	33	Conner Noah	Fr
RB	34	Spencer Firebaugh	Fr
TE	44	Oliver Stuart	Fr
TE	47	Rory Morgan	Jr
OL	52	Tyson Ruffins	Fr
OL	54	Josh Grabowski	So
OL	55	Joey Capra	Sr
OL	56	Zac Welch	Sr
OL	62	Frank Poso	Sr
OL	63	R. J. Taylor	Jr
OL	64	Kai Arneson	Jr
OL	67	R. J. Esmon	Fr
OL	68	Jacob Nunez	Jr
OL	70	Isaiah World	So
OL	71	Josiah Timoteo	Fr
OL	73	Josh Castro	GS
OL	74	Garvey Gordon	So
OL	75	Shawn Klingler	Fr
OL	77	John Bolles	Jr
OL	78	Andrew Madrigal	So
OL	79	Cole Feinauer	So
WR	80	Ross Nickson	Fr
TE	81	Keleki Latu	Jr
TE	82	Jayden O'Rourke	Fr
WR	83	Aaron Smith	Jr
WR	84	Jeremiah Gradowitz	Jr
TE	85	Cameron Zeidler	Fr
TE	86	Dyson Frank	So
WR	88	Tyler Clark	Fr
TE	89	Cooper Shults	Sr

Defense

Pos.	#	Name	Class
DL	0	Henry Ikahihifo	GS
DB	1	Caine Savage	Sr
CB	2	Isaiah Essissima	Sr
DB	3	Michael Coats Jr.	Sr
LB	4	Eli'jah Winston	GS
DB	5	Emany Johnson	GS
DB	6	Jaden Dedman	GS
LB	7	Jonathan Thomas	Jr
DB	8	Tre Weed	GS
LB	9	Davion Blackwell	Jr
DB	10	K. K. Meier	Fr
LB	11	Marcel Walker-Burgess	Jr
DB	12	Kacee Williams	Sr
DB	13	Ezekiel Robbins	Sr
DB	14	Devin Gunter	Jr
S	15	Bishop Turner	Fr
LB	16	Kaleo Neves	Sr
DB	17	Micah Camat	Jr
DB	19	KeeKee McQueen	Fr
S	20	Journey McKoy	Fr
LB	22	Hezekiah Anahu-Ambrosio	Fr
DB	23	Richard Toney Jr.	So
DB	24	Chad Brown	Sr
CB	25	Dorian Blackwell	So
DB	26	Tooni Ikahihifo Jr.	Jr
DB	28	Tori Mulkey	Sr
CB	30	Jonah Lewis Jr.	Fr
DB	31	Donoven DeRicco	Fr
LB	32	Drue Watts	So
LB	33	Stone Combs	Fr
LB	34	Malcolm McClure	Fr
DB	35	Elijah Acklin	Fr
LB	36	Tongiaki Mateialona	Sr
LB	37	Marques Allen-Patmon	Jr
LB	39	Micah Lilo	Jr
LB	42	Jackson LaDuke	So
LB	44	Zach Beagle	GS
LB	45	Chris Smalley	So
DB	46	Aedan Seiuli	So
DL	47	Hunter Kaupiko	Jr
DL	50	Louie Cresto	Jr
LB	51	Junior Walling	Jr
DL	52	Dwight Togiola	So
DL	54	Sosefo Moeaki	Jr
DL	55	Mackavelli Malotumau	So
LB	56	Adam Weynand	Jr
BB	57	Andoni Fessenmaier	Fr
LB	58	Jayden LaGrone	Fr
LB	66	Thomas Witte	Jr
DL	72	Cade Rodahaffer	Fr
DL	89	D'Angelo Davis	Fr
DL	90	Ike Nnakenyi	Fr
DL	91	James Hansen	Sr
DE	92	Dion Washington	So
LB	95	Jonathan Maldonado	Fr
DL	96	Tanner Vaughan	So
DT	99	William Green Jr.	GS

Special teams

Pos.	#	Name	Class
JR	18	Matthew Killam	Jr
K/P	38	Boden Page	Fr
LS	40	Jackson Robertson	Fr
K	43	Brandon Talton	GS
P	48	Matt Freem	GS
LS	88	Nick Barcelos	Sr

Head coach

- Ken Wilson

Coordinators/assistant coaches

- Vai Taua – Assistant head coach/Running backs
- Derek Sage – Offensive coordinator/Quarterbacks
- Kwame Agyeman – Co-defensive coordinator/safeties
- Mike Bethea – Co-defensive coordinator/Linebackers
- Peyton Yanagi – Special teams coordinator
- Anthony Arceneaux – Wide receivers
- Virgil Green – Tight ends
- Al Lapuaho – Defensive linemen
- Angus McClure – Passing game coordinator/Offensive linemen
- Jalen Ortiz – Cornerbacks
- Mason Baggett – Director, Strength and Conditioning
- Jordan Loeffler – Offensive analyst
- Nick Yaver – Offensive analyst
- Jake Belzer – Defensive analyst
- Jeff Magdaleno – Defensive analyst
- Garrett McClure – Graduate assistant
- Gabe Sewell – Graduate assistant
- Tyson Williams – Graduate assistant

Legend

- (C) Team captain
- (S) Suspended
- (I) Ineligible
- Injured
- Redshirt

Roster
Last update: 9/4/23

== Game summaries ==
=== at No. 6 USC ===
Nevada Wolf Pack (0–0) at No. 6 USC Trojans (1–0) – Game summary

Quarter	1	2	3	4	Total
Wolf Pack	7	0	0	7	14
No. 6 Trojans	21	14	7	24	66

at Los Angeles Memorial Coliseum • Los Angeles, CA

- Date: September 2, 2023
- Game time: 3:30 p.m.
- Game weather: Temperature: 79 °F (26 °C) • Wind: SE at 6 miles per hour (9.7 km/h) • Weather: Cloudy
- Game attendance: 62,916
- Referee: Christopher Wiggins
- TV announcers (Pac-12 Network): Ted Robinson (play-by-play), Yogi Roth (analyst)

Game information

First quarter

- (12:45) USC – Zachariah Branch 22-yard pass from Caleb Williams, Denis Lynch kick (Drive: 4 plays, 79 yards, 2:10; USC 7–0)
- (11:01) NEV – Sean Dollars 3-yard rush, Brandon Talton kick (Drive: 4 plays, 85 yards, 1:39; Tied 7–7)
- (5:18) USC – MarShawn Lloyd 24-yard rush, Denis Lynch kick (Drive: 4 plays, 54 yards, 2:12; USC 14–7)
- (2:13) USC – Tahj Washington 22-yard pass from Caleb Williams, Denis Lynch kick (Drive: 4 plays, 45 yards, 2:10; USC 21–7)

Second quarter

- (14:08) USC – Michael Jackson III 15-yard pass from Caleb Williams, Denis Lynch kick (Drive: 4 plays, 68 yards, 1:11; USC 28–7)
- (6:17) USC – Brenden Rice 13-yard pass from Caleb Williams, Denis Lynch kick (Drive: 3 plays, 64 yards, 2:17; USC 35–7)

Third quarter

- (10:08) USC – Tahj Washington 45-yard pass from Caleb Williams, Denis Lynch kick (Drive: 7 plays, 67 yards, 2:59; USC 42–7)

Fourth quarter

- (13:30) USC – Denis Lunch 47-yard field goal, (Drive: 10 plays, 79 yards, 4:42; USC 45–7)
- (12:05) USC – Stanley Ta'ufo'ou 23-yard fumble return, Denis Lynch kick (Drive: 3 plays, -2 yards, 1:24; USC 52–7)
- (11:18) NEV – Jamaal Bell 77-yard pass from AJ Bianco, Brandon Talton kick (Drive: 2 plays, 75 yards, 0:47; USC 52–14)
- (9:09) USC – Quinten Joyner 47-yard rush, Denis Lynch kick (Drive: 5 plays, 69 yards, 2:01; USC 59–14)
- (4:02) USC – Duce Robinson 71-yard pass from Miller Moss, Tyler Robles kick (Drive: 2 plays, 68 yards, 0:54; USC 66–14)

Statistics	NEV	USC
First downs	12	28
Total yards	360	668
Rushes/yards	38–49	20–215
Passing yards	311	453
Passing: Comp–Att–Int	22–34–0	25–34–0
Time of possession	35:59	24:01

Team	Category	Player	Statistics
Nevada	Passing	Brendon Lewis	18/29, 182 yards
Nevada	Rushing	Sean Dollars	9 carries, 33 yards, TD
Nevada	Receiving	Jamaal Bell	8 receptions, 121 yards, TD
USC	Passing	Caleb Williams	18/24, 319 yards, 5 TD
USC	Rushing	MarShawn Lloyd	7 carries, 76 yards, TD
USC	Receiving	Tahj Washington	3 receptions, 75 yards, 2 TDs

=== No. 7 (FCS) Idaho ===
No. 7 Idaho Vandals (1–0) at Nevada Wolf Pack (0–1) – Game summary

Quarter	1	2	3	4	Total
No. 7 Vandals	14	3	10	6	33
Wolf Pack	3	3	0	0	6

at Mackay Stadium • Reno, NV

- Date: September 9, 2023
- Game time: 4:00 p.m. PDT
- Game attendance: 19,852
- TV: KNSN-TV

=== Kansas ===
Kansas Jayhawks (2–0) at Nevada Wolf Pack (0–2) – Game summary

Quarter	1	2	3	4	Total
Jayhawks	7	3	14	7	31
Wolf Pack	0	10	7	7	24

at Mackay Stadium • Reno, Nevada

- Date: Saturday, September 16, 2023
- Game time: 9:30 pm CDT
- Game weather: Sunny • Temperature: 76 °F (24 °C)
- Game attendance: 16,890
- Referee: Derek Anderson
- TV announcers (CBSSN): Rich Waltz, Aaron Taylor
- Gamebook

Game information

First quarter

- KU 9:46 Devin Neal 3 yard run (Seth Keller kick good), 9–75, 5:14 KU 7–0

Second quarter

- UN 14:49 Brandon Talton 42 yard field goal, 9–24, 4:00 KU 7–3
- KU 8:55 Seth Keller 44 yard field goal 13–47, 5:54 KU 10–7
- UN 0:29 Sean Dollars 3 yard run (Brandon Talton kick good) 10–78, 4:55 10–10

Third quarter

- KU 5:07 Daniel Hishaw Jr. 1 yard run (Seth Keller kick good), 11–84, 4:41 KU 17–10
- UN 3:33 Brendon Lewis 6 yard run (Brandon Talton kick good) 4–65, 1:34 17–17
- KU 3:00 Devin Neal 1 yard run (Seth Keller kick good) 2–75, 0:33 KU 24–17

Fourth quarter

- UN 10:37 Brendon Lewis 2 yard run (Brandon Talton kick good) 14–75, 7:23 24–24
- KU 6:20 Devin Neal 3 yard run (Seth Keller kick good) 9–75, 4:17 KU 31–24

Statistics	KU	UN
First downs	24	14
Plays–yards	67–441	59–263
Rushes–yards	40–143	37–150
Passing yards	298	113
Passing: comp–att–int	21–27–0	15–22–0
Turnovers		
Time of possession	31:51	28:09

Team	Category	Player	Statistics
Kansas	Passing	Jalon Daniels	21/27 298 yards
Kansas	Rushing	Devin Neal	17 carries 89 yards 3 TDs
Kansas	Receiving	Mason Fairchild	5 receptions 74 yards
Nevada	Passing	Brendon Lewis	15/22 113 carries
Nevada	Rushing	Brendon Lewis	11 carries 58 yards
Nevada	Receiving	Dalevon Campbell	1 reception 53 yards

=== at Texas State ===
Nevada Wolf Pack (0–3) at Texas State Bobcats (2–1) – Game summary

Quarter	1	2	3	4	Total
Wolf Pack	10	7	0	7	24
Bobcats	0	0	21	14	35

at Bobcat Stadium, San Marcos, Texas

- Date: September 23
- Game time: 6:00 p.m. CDT
- Game weather: Sunny
- Game attendance: 19,257
- Referee: Javarro Edwards
- TV announcers (ESPN+): Brant Freeman, Keith Moreland, and Koral Riggs
- Box score, Recap

Game information
First quarter
- NEV – Brandon Talton 30-yard field goal, 9:27. Wolf Pack 3–0. Drive: 13 plays, 63 yards, 5:33.
- NEV – KK Meier 98-yard interception return (Brandon Talton kick), 5:08. Wolf Pack 10–0.

Second quarter

- NEV – Zac Welch 0-yard fumble return (Brandon Talton kick), 11:11. Wolf Pack 17–0.

Third quarter

- TXST – Joey Hobert 25-yard pass from TJ Finley (Mason Shipley kick), 9:43. Wolf Pack 17–7. Drive: 10 plays, 75 yards, 5:17.
- TXST – Kole Wilson 77-yard pass from TJ Finley (Mason Shipley kick), 3:42. Wolf Pack 17–14. Drive: 2 plays, 83 yards, 0:42.
- TXST – Ismail Mahdi 46-yard run (Mason Shipley kick), 0:49. Bobcats 21–17. Drive: 5 plays, 58 yards, 1:33.

Fourth quarter

- TXST – Ismail Mahdi 36-yard run (Mason Shipley kick), 8:30. Bobcats 28–17. Drive: 7 plays, 75 yards, 3:47.
- TXST – Malik Hornsby 13-yard run (Mason Shipley kick), 4:50. Bobcats 35–17. Drive: 3 plays, 34 yards, 1:25.
- NEV – AJ Bianco 2-yard run (Brandon Talton kick), 0:57. Bobcats 35–24. Drive: 9 plays, 75 yards, 3:53.

Statistics

Statistics	NEV	TXST
First downs	20	24
Total yards	353	574
Rushing yards	159	276
Passing yards	194	298
Turnovers	3	3
Time of possession	31:25	28:35

Team	Category	Player	Statistics
Nevada	Passing	Brendon Lewis	21/32, 151 yards, INT
Nevada	Rushing	Brandon Lewis	12 rushes, 89 yards
Nevada	Receiving	Isaiah Essissima	2 receptions, 67 yards
Texas State	Passing	TJ Finley	25/31, 295 yards, 2 TD, INT
Texas State	Rushing	Ismail Mahdi	21 rushes, 216 yards, 2 TD
Texas State	Receiving	Kole Wilson	4 receptions, 93 yards, TD

=== at No. 25 Fresno State ===
Nevada Wolf Pack (0–4) at No. 25 Fresno State Bulldogs (4–0) – Game summary

Quarter	1	2	3	4	Total
Wolf Pack	0	0	0	9	9
No. 25 Bulldogs	7	7	6	7	27

at Valley Children's Stadium • Fresno, California

- Date: Saturday, September 30, 2023
- Game time: 7:30 p.m. PDT
- Game weather: Clear • Temperature: 68 °F (20 °C) • Wind: NW 7mph
- Game attendance: 39,246
- Referee: Patrick Foy
- TV announcers (FS1): Dan Hellie (play-by-play) & Petros Papadakis (analyst)

Game information

First quarter

- (2:12) FRES – Jaelen Gill 65-yard pass from Mikey Keene, Dylan Lynch kick (Drive: 6 plays, 88 yards, 3:30; Fresno State 7–0)

Second quarter

- (4:15) FRES – Malik Sherrod 72-yard run, Dylan Lynch kick (Drive: 5 plays, 97 yards, 2:41; Fresno State 14–0)

Third quarter

- (9:13) FRES – Dylan Lynch 48-yard field goal (Drive: 7 plays, 30 yards, 2:22; Fresno State 17–0)
- (4:51) FRES – Dylan Lynch 40-yard field goal (Drive: 9 plays, 60 yards, 3:27; Fresno State 20–0)

Fourth quarter

- (12:37) FRES – Jaelen Gill 12-yard pass from Mikey Keene, Dylan Lynch kick (Drive: 7 plays, 68 yards, 3:14; Fresno State 27–0)
- (8:22) NEV – Nevada tackles Fresno State running back Elijah Gilliam in end zone for a safety (Fresno State 27–2)
- (0:11) NEV – Spencer Curtis 12-yard pass from AJ Bianco, Brandon Talton kick (Drive: 8 plays, 90 yards, 2:31; Fresno State 27–9)

Statistics	NEV	FRES
First downs	17	19
Plays–yards	66–220	59–410
Rushes–yards	31–53	25–141
Passing yards	167	269
Passing: comp–att–int	19–35–2	26–34–2
Turnovers		
Time of possession	30:33	29:27

Team	Category	Player	Statistics
Nevada	Passing	AJ Bianco	9/14, 97 yards, TD
Nevada	Rushing	Brendon Lewis	15 carries, 31 yards
Nevada	Receiving	Spencer Curtis	8 receptions, 73 yards, TD
Fresno State	Passing	Mikey Keene	26/34, 269 yards, 2 TD, 2 INT
Fresno State	Rushing	Malik Sherrod	12 carries, 123 yards, TD
Fresno State	Receiving	Jaelen Gill	8 receptions, 126 yards 2 TD

=== UNLV ===
UNLV Rebels (4–1) at Nevada Wolf Pack (0–5) – Game summary

Quarter	1	2	3	4	Total
Rebels	14	14	10	7	45
Wolf Pack	7	0	7	13	27

at Mackay Stadium • Reno, NV

- Date: October 14, 2023
- Game time: 7:00 p.m.
- Game weather: Sunny, 70 °F (21 °C)
- Game attendance: 24,578
- Referee: Michael Cuttone
- TV announcers (KVVU): Steve Cofield, Matt Neverett

Game information

First quarter

- (12:40) UNLV – Ricky White 59-yard pass from Jayden Maiava, Jose Pizano kick (Drive: 2 plays, 69 yards, 0:18; UNLV 7–0)
- (5:47) UNLV – Donavyn Lester 1-yard run, Jose Pizano kick (Drive: 9 plays, 79 yards, 4:10; UNLV 14–0)
- (3:01) NEV – Dalevon Campbell 43-yard pass from Brendon Lewis, Brandon Talton kick (Drive: 6 plays, 78 yards, 2:41; UNLV 14–7)

Second quarter

- (13:21) UNLV – Donavyn Lester 16-yard run, Jose Pizano kick (Drive: 3 plays, 23 yards, 1:14; UNLV 21–7)
- (5:38) UNLV – Ricky White 82-yard pass from Jayden Maiava, Jose Pizano kick (Drive: 6 plays, 92 yards, 3:03; UNLV 28–7)

Third quarter

- (14:00) UNLV – Donavyn Lester 66-yard run, Jose Pizano kick (Drive: 3 plays, 75 yards, 1:00; UNLV 35–7)
- (11:15) NEV – Brendon Lewis 6-yard run, Brandon Talton kick (Drive: 7 plays, 79 yards, 2:40; UNLV 35–14)
- (1:43) UNLV – Jose Pizano 25-yard field goal (Drive: 9 plays, 28 yards, 4:41; UNLV 38–14)

Fourth quarter

- (11:15) NEV – Sean Dollars 2-yard run, kick failed (Drive: 12 plays, 75 yards, 4:25; UNLV 38–20)
- (3:37) UNLV – Vincent Davis 9-yard run, Jose Pizano kick (Drive: 4 plays, 20 yards, 2:08; UNLV 45–20)
- (1:51) NEV – Isaah Crocker 55-yard pass from Brendon Lewis, Brandon Talton kick (Drive: 5 plays, 75 yards, 1:46; UNLV 45–27)

Statistics	UNLV	NEV
First downs	22	19
Total yards	518	474
Rushing yards	48–259	37–187
Passing yards	259	287
Passing: Comp–Att–Int	19–24–0	16–31–2
Time of possession	32:41	27:17

Team	Category	Player	Statistics
UNLV	Passing	Jayden Maiava	19/24, 259 yards, 2 TD
UNLV	Rushing	Donavyn Lester	10 carries, 99 yards, 3 TD
UNLV	Receiving	Ricky White	7 receptions, 166 yards, 2 TD
Nevada	Passing	Brendon Lewis	16/31, 287 yards, 2 TD, 2 INT
Nevada	Rushing	Brendon Lewis	15 carries, 115 yards, TD
Nevada	Receiving	Dalevon Campbell	3 receptions, 93 yards, TD

=== at San Diego State ===
Nevada Wolf Pack (0–6) vs. San Diego State Aztecs (3–4)

Quarter	1	2	3	4	Total
Wolf Pack	3	3	0	0	6
Aztecs	0	0	0	0	0

at Snapdragon Stadium, San Diego, California

- Date: October 21
- Game time: 6:00 p.m. PDT
- Game weather: Sunny, Temperature: 72 °F (22 °C), Wind: N 9 mph
- Game attendance: 27,122
- Referee: Patrick Foy
- TV announcers (FS2): Dan Hellie (play-by-play) and Robert Smith (analyst)

Game information

First Quarter

- (7:03) NEV - Brandon Talton 39 yard field goal; 13 plays, 51 yards, 6:30 (Nevada 3–0)

Second Quarter

- (0:00) NEV - Brandon Talton 37 yard field goal; 6 plays, 46 yards, 0:50 (Nevada 6-0)

Third Quarter

None

Fourth Quarter

None

Statistics	Nevada	San Diego State
First downs	26	21
Plays–yards	61–242	53–204
Rushes–yards	39–144	39–157
Passing yards	242	204
Passing: comp–att–int	9–22–0	6–14–0
Turnovers		
Time of possession	30:14	29:46

Team	Category	Player	Statistics
Nevada	Passing	Brendon Lewis	9–22, 98 yards
Nevada	Rushing	Sean Dollars	11 carries, 49 yards
Nevada	Receiving	Dalevon Campbell	1 reception, 44 yards
San Diego State	Passing	Jalen Mayden	6–14, 47 yards
San Diego State	Rushing	Jalen Mayden	14 carries, 52 yards
San Diego State	Receiving	Mekhi Shaw	1 reception, 19 yards

=== Hawaii ===
Hawaii Rainbow Warriors (2–7) at Nevada Wolf Pack (2–6)

Quarter	1	2	3	4	Total
Rainbow Warriors	0	17	7	3	27
Wolf Pack	0	0	14	0	14

at Mackay Stadium, Reno, NV

- Date: November 4, 2023
- Game time: 1:00 p.m. PST
- Game attendance: 15,540
- TV: SPEC PPV

=== at Colorado State ===
Nevada Wolf Pack (2–8) at Colorado State Rams (4–6) – Game summary

Quarter	1	2	3	4	Total
Wolf Pack	3	10	7	0	20
Rams	14	6	3	7	30

at Canvas Stadium • Fort Collins, Colorado

- Date: November 18th
- Game time: 1:00 p.m. MST/12:00 p.m. PST
- Game weather: Temperature: 59 °F (15 °C) • Wind: SE at 4 miles per hour (6.4 km/h) • Weather: Sunny
- Game attendance: 20,121
- Referee: Cal McNeill
- TV: MWN

Game information

First quarter

Second quarter

Third quarter

Fourth quarter

Statistics	Nevada	Colorado State
First downs	21	23
Plays–yards	73–327	65–414
Rushes–yards	43–133	34–169
Passing yards	194	245
Passing: comp–att–int	21–30–2	15–31–1
Turnovers		
Time of possession	35:30	24:30

Team	Category	Player	Statistics
Nevada	Passing	Brendon Lewis	18/24, 169 yards
Nevada	Rushing	Sean Dollars	20 carries, 69 yards
Nevada	Receiving	Dalevon Campbell	5 receptions, 72 yards
Colorado State	Passing	Brayden Fowler-Nicolosi	15/30, 245 yards, 2 TD, INT
Colorado State	Rushing	Justin Marshall	19 carries, 98 yards
Colorado State	Receiving	Tory Horton	6 receptions, 78 yards, TD

=== Wyoming ===
Wyoming Cowboys (7–4) at Nevada Wolf Pack (2–9) – Game summary

Quarter	1	2	3	4	Total
Cowboys	14	7	14	7	42
Wolf Pack	0	6	0	0	6

at Mackay Stadium, Reno, Nevada

- Date: November 25
- Game time: 7:08 p.m. MDT
- Game weather: Clear, 33 °F (1 °C)
- Game attendance: 12,044
- Referee: Patrick Foy
- TV announcers (CBSSN): John Sadak, Randy Cross

Game information

First quarter

- WYO – Andrew Peasley 43-yard run (John Hoyland kick), 6:32. Cowboys 7–0. Drive: 4 plays, 63 yards, 2:05.
- WYO – Will Pelissier 34-yard pass from Andrew Peasley (John Hoyland kick), 3:29. Cowboys 14–0. Drive: 2 plays, 55 yards, 1:27.

Second quarter

- NEV – Brandon Talton 40-yard field goal, 13:28. Cowboys 14–3. Drive: 9 plays, 43 yards, 5:01.
- WYO – Wyatt Ekeler 38-yard interception (John Hoyland kick), 9:54. Cowboys 21–3.
- NEV – Brandon Talton 47-yard field goal, 2:23. Cowboys 21–6. Drive: 10 plays, 51 yards, 4:46.

Third quarter

- WYO – Ayir Asante 9-yard pass from Andrew Peasley (John Hoyland kick), 11:43. Cowboys 28–6. Drive: 5 plays, 25 yards, 3:05.
- WYO – Harrison Waylee 2-yard run (John Hoyland kick), 7:09. Cowboys 35–6. Drive: 5 plays, 44 yards, 2:54.

Fourth quarter

- WYO – Andrew Peasley 3-yard run (John Hoyland kick), 12:56. Cowboys 42–6. Drive: 12 plays, 82 yards, 6:19.

Top passers

- WYO – Andrew Peasley – 12/18, 165 yards, 2 TD
- NEV – Shane Illingworth – 15/27, 175 yards, INT

Top rushers

- WYO – Andrew Peasley – 9 rushes, 96 yards, 2 TD
- NEV – Sean Dollars – 8 rushes, 31 yards

Top receivers

- WYO – Wyatt Wieland – 4 receptions, 43 yards
- NEV – Spencer Curtis – 5 receptions, 70 yards
