= Thurgood Marshall High School (Texas) =

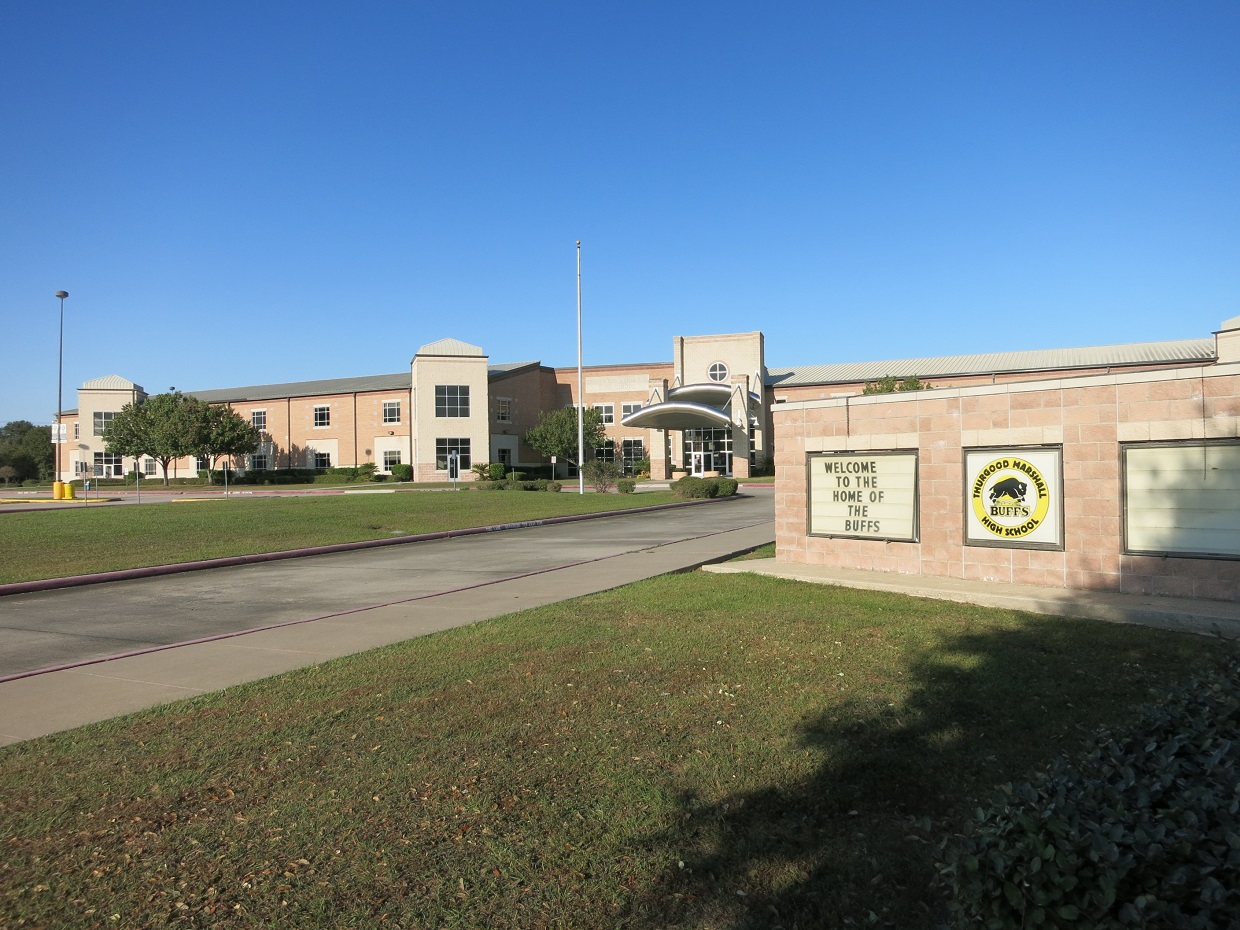

Location
- 1220 Buffalo Run; Missouri City, Texas 77489; United States; 29.611246°N 95.522718°W

Information
- Type: Public High School
- Established: 2002
- School district: Fort Bend Independent School District
- Principal: Dr.Ogechi Uwaga-Sanders
- Teaching staff: 104.98 (on a FTE basis)
- Grades: 9–12
- Enrollment: 1,615 (2023–2024)
- Student to teacher ratio: 15.38
- Colors: Black and Gold
- Nickname: Buffalo
- Website: mhs.fortbendisd.gov

Thurgood Marshall High School is a public high school located in Missouri City, Texas and is a part of the Fort Bend Independent School District.

Marshall, serving grades 9 through 12, serves sections of Missouri City and a portion of the extraterritorial jurisdiction of Stafford, including sections of Fifth Street. A small portion of the City of Houston is in the school's boundary.

Marshall was named after Thurgood Marshall, the first African-American to serve in the Supreme Court of the United States. The mascot is the Buffalo Soldier represented by the Marshall Buffalo and the school colors are black and gold.

== History ==
Marshall opened on August 15, 2002 and was dedicated on October 13 of the same year.

Marshall was FBISD’s Ninth Comprehensive School.

Marshall is magnetized for its three career academies, Electronic Engineering (EE), Geographical Information Systems (GIS) (Discontinued), and Fire Science Technology. The EE Academy's FIRST Robotics team has received distinguished honors from FIRST in its six years of existence. In the Fall of 2009 they are proposed to open the first International Baccalaureate program in Fort Bend Independent School District.

The Air Force JROTC Unit at Thurgood Marshall High School earned the 2009-2010 Distinguished Unit Award.

During the 2009-2010 school year, Marshall was rated as a recognized school for the first time in school history.

== Attendance zone ==
A Houston Housing Authority (HHA) public housing complex, Willow Park Apartments, is assigned to Marshall High.

== Athletics ==
=== Men's ===
- Football
  - 2019 State Finalist (5A/D2)
- Basketball
- Baseball
- Track & Field
- Golf
- Swimming
- Tennis

=== Women's ===
- Volleyball
- Track & Field
- Basketball
- Swimming
- Softball
- Tennis

== Feeder patterns ==
The following elementary schools feed into Marshall:

- Armstrong
- Glover
- Hunters Glen
- E.A. Jones

The following middle schools feed into Marshall:

- Missouri City

== Notable alumni ==
- Aubrey Coleman (2005), former professional basketball player
- C. J. Webster (2005), former professional basketball player
- Stephen Williams (2005), former NFL wide receiver
- Antwon Blake (2008), former NFL cornerback
- Knile Davis (2009), former NFL running back
- DeAndré Washington (2011), former NFL running back
- Kendall Sheffield (2015), NFL cornerback
- Dalevon Campbell (2019), NFL wide receiver for the Los Angeles Chargers
- De'Von Achane (2020), NFL running back for the Miami Dolphins
- A. J. Haulcy (2022), college football defensive back
- Chris Marshall (2022), college football wide receiver
- Jaland Lowe (2023), college basketball point guard
