= Adrian Awasom =

American gridiron football player (born 1983)

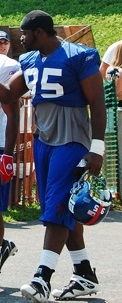
- Awasom with the New York Giants in 2007

No. 95, 67
- Position: Defensive end

Personal information
- Born: October 25, 1983 (age 43); Douala, Cameroon
- Listed height: 6 ft 5 in (1.96 m)
- Listed weight: 280 lb (127 kg)

Career information
- High school: Stafford (Stafford, Texas, U.S.)
- College: North Texas
- NFL draft: 2005: undrafted

Career history
- New York Giants (2005–2007); Las Vegas Locomotives (2009–2010); Minnesota Vikings (2011); Orlando Predators (2012); Las Vegas Locomotives (2012); Toronto Argonauts (2012); BC Lions (2013–2014)

Awards and highlights
- Super Bowl champion (XLII); 2× UFL champion (2009, 2010); 2× First-team All-Sun Belt (2003, 2004); Second-team All-Sun Belt (2002)

Career NFL statistics
- Total tackles: 17
- Sacks: 1
- Stats at Pro Football Reference

Adrian Awasom (born October 25, 1983) is a Cameroonian former professional gridiron football defensive end who played in the National Football League (NFL). He was signed by the New York Giants as an undrafted free agent in 2005. He played college football at North Texas.

== Early life ==
Awasom was born in Cameroon and moved with his family to the United States when he was four, growing up in Fort Bend County, Texas. Awasom attended Stafford High School where he was a three-sport start in football, basketball, and track. A two time All-District member and caught 22 passes for 350 yards at tight end as a senior. As a member of the basketball team, Awasom was a two-time All-State member averaging 16.7 ppg and 16.7 rpg as a senior and also earning All-Area honors. In track, he was a two-time All-State performer with a personal best of 189'74". Awasom is one of four players from Stafford HS to play in the NFL, others being Boris Anyama, Craig Robertson, and Jalen Pitre.

== College career ==
Named a member of the All-Sun Belt Conference Team three straight years to finish his career, Awasom assembled some monster numbers during that stretch from his spot on the defensive line. The 2004 season saw Adrian register 53 total tackles, 14 of which were for a loss of yards, which ranks fifth in school history. His most impressive game that season came in a win over Utah State when Awasom had 4.5 TFL, the second most tackles for loss in a game in program history. His 32 TFL's rank 3rd on the school all-time list and his 20 career sacks sits second. Awasom finished his career with 147 total tackles, four Sun Belt Conference Championships and three All-SBC selections.

As a junior in 2003, Awasom totaled 44 tackles, including seven tackles for losses and four sacks, in 12 games and recorded a career-best eight sacks as a sophomore in 2002. Named a three-time all-Sun Belt Conference honoree, including a 1st-team selection as a junior and senior.

== Professional career ==
=== New York Giants ===
Awasom was signed as an undrafted rookie free agent by the Giants in 2005, playing primarily on the special teams unit. In 2006, he played ten games as a defensive end, and recorded two quarterback sacks. Awasom won Super Bowl XLII to conclude the 2007 NFL season He was released before the start of the 2008 season after suffering a season ending neck injury.

=== Las Vegas Locomotives ===
Awasom was drafted first by the Las Vegas Locomotives on June 18, 2009. According to National Football Post, after two season with the UFL Awasom is drawing interest from a few NFL teams after recording 20 tackles and three sacks during a championship season with the Las Vegas Locomotives.

=== Minnesota Vikings ===
After spending two years in the UFL, Awasom was signed by the Minnesota Vikings on January 22, 2011. During his time with the Vikings Adrian racked up 3.5 sacks in the pre-season, tied for first in the NFL among all active defensive ends during that time. After a productive season Awasom was released on September 21, 2011.

=== Orlando Predators ===
In late 2011, Awasom signed with the Orlando Predators of the Arena Football League. In 2012, he was placed on the Predators' injured list after injuring his shoulder in the pre-season, which caused him to miss the rest of the season.

=== Las Vegas Locomotives ===
Awasom re-signed with the Locomotives for the 2012 UFL season.

=== Toronto Argonauts ===
On December 14, 2012, Awasom signed with the Toronto Argonauts of the Canadian Football League.

=== BC Lions ===
On April 2, 2013, the Argonauts traded him to the BC Lions for defensive lineman Khalif Mitchell. He was released by the Lions on May 15, 2014.
