= C. J. Webster =

American professional basketball forward (born 1986)

Personal information
- Born: October 29, 1986 (age 38) Houston, Texas, U.S.
- Listed height: 6 ft 9 in (2.06 m)
- Listed weight: 255 lb (116 kg)

Career information
- High school: Thurgood Marshall (Missouri City, Texas)
- College: Texas State (2005–2006); San Jose State (2007–2010)
- NBA draft: 2010: undrafted
- Playing career: 2011–present
- Position: Power forward
- Number: 45

Career history
- 2011: Mount Gambier Pioneers
- 2011: Bashkimi Prizren
- 2012: Panteras de Miranda
- 2012–2013: Albany Blazers
- 2015: Cleveland Havok

Career highlights
- WAC All-Newcomer team (2008)

Clifton Darryl Webster, Jr. (born October 29, 1986) is an American professional basketball forward.

== Early life ==
Webster was born in Houston, Texas and graduated from Thurgood Marshall High School at Missouri City, Texas in 2004.

College recruiting information
Name	Hometown	School	Height	Weight	Commit date
C. J. Webster; PF	Missouri City, Texas	Thurgood Marshall HS	6 ft 8 in (2.03 m)	240 lb (110 kg)	Nov 4, 2004
C. J. Webster; PF	Recruit ratings: Scout:				
Overall recruit ranking:
Note: In many cases, Scout, Rivals, 247Sports, On3, and ESPN may conflict in their listings of height and weight.; In these cases, the average was taken. ESPN grades are on a 100-point scale.; Sources: "2005 Texas St. Basketball Commitment List". Rivals.; "2005 Texas State College Basketball Team Recruiting Prospects". Scout.; "Scout.com Team Recruiting Rankings". Scout.; "2005 Team Ranking". Rivals.

== College ==
In 2005, Webster committed with Texas State University–San Marcos. He played nine games with the Texas State Bobcats and averaged 4.6 points per game and 1.8 rebounds. Webster suffered a stress fracture in his left shin as a freshman. In 2006, Webster transferred to the University of Arkansas – Fort Smith and later Houston Community College, from which he earned an associate degree in 2007. Webster did not play basketball at either school.

In 2007, Webster signed with San Jose State University. He played three seasons with the San Jose State Spartans. In 2007–2008, his sophomore season, Webster started all 32 games with averages of 11.3 points, 6.8 rebounds, and 2.1 assists per game. In his junior season of 2008–09, Webster averaged 12.0 points and 6.5 rebounds. However, Webster missed five games due to an eye injury. The NCAA granted Webster a sixth season of eligibility with a medical waiver.

In the 2009–10 season, also classified as a junior, Webster averaged 8.8 points and 4.8 rebounds. With one season of eligibility left and a few classes to complete for his sociology degree, combined with the recent birth of his daughter, Webster decided to declare for the NBA draft after this season. Webster was not selected in the draft.

== Professional career ==
In January 2011, he signed with the Mount Gambier Pioneers of the South East Australian Basketball League.

In November 2011, Webster joined Bashkimi Prizren of the Kosovar Siguria Superleague. He scored 29 points in his debut game with Bashkimi on November 10, when Bashkimi defeated KB Futura 106–76.

In February 2012, Panteras de Miranda of the Venezuelan Liga Profesional de Baloncesto signed Webster. He was released one month later.

Webster played for the Albany Blazers of the ABA for the 2012–13 season. In 2015, Webster joined the Cleveland Havok of the Universal Basketball Association. In his first game with the Havok, Webster had 6 points and 3 rebounds.
