= Stafford Municipal School District =

School district in Texas, United States

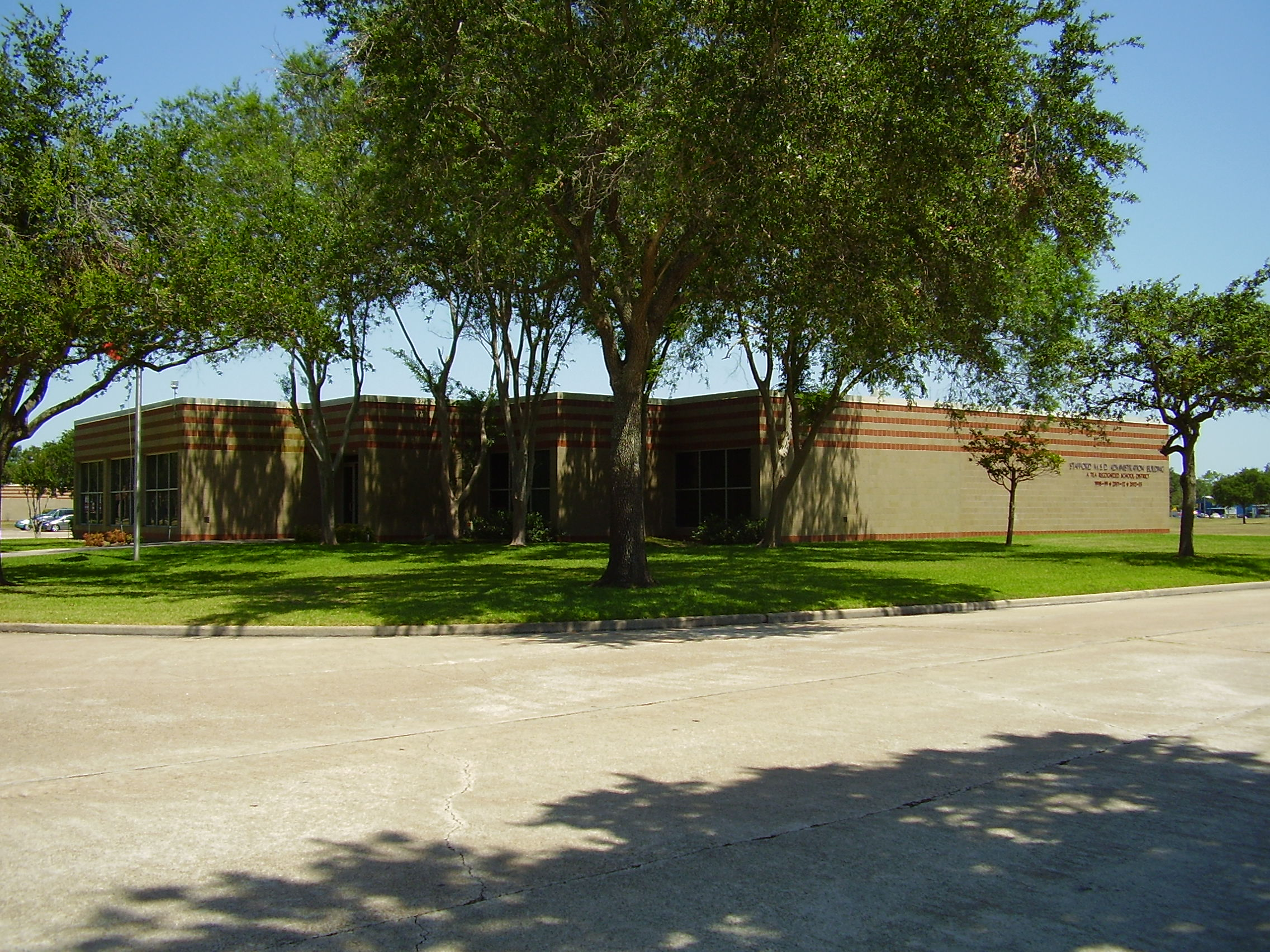
- Stafford Municipal School District administrative building

Address
- 1633 Staffordshire Road, Stafford, Texas, 77477; United States

District information
- Type: Public
- Grades: Pre-K through 12
- Superintendent: Dr. Robert Bostick
- School board: Ash Hamirani Manuel Hinojosa Dawn Reichling Jacqueline Jean-Baptiste Alicia Lacy-Castille Greg Holsapple Christopher Caldwell
- Schools: 5
- NCES District ID: 4841350

Students and staff
- Students: 3,479 (2023–2024)
- Teachers: 220.46 (on an FTE basis)
- Student–teacher ratio: 15.78:1

Other information
- Website: www.staffordmsd.org

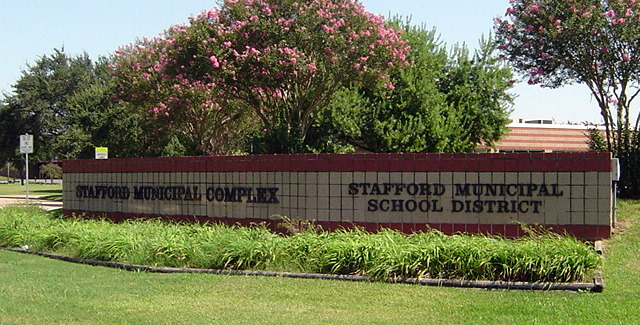
Stafford schools are located at the Stafford Municipal Complex in the southern part of the city off of Staffordshire Road at Constitution Avenue

Stafford Municipal School District (SMSD) is a school district based in Stafford, Texas, United States in Greater Houston. The district covers all of the city of Stafford.

The primary/elementary School building houses grades Pre-K through 5, the Middle School building houses grades 6 through 8, the High School building houses grades 9 through 12. The administration building and athletic facilities are on the same campus as the school buildings.

The Stafford MSD area is served by the Houston City College System.

In 2018, the school district was rated an overall B by the Texas Education Agency.

The U.S. Census Bureau considers this district to be an independent school district government.

== History ==
The majority of Stafford was initially a part of the Fort Bend Independent School District. Fort Bend ISD banned public bussing for students living two miles or less from their school, which proved to be unpopular in Stafford and initiated a movement to secede from FBISD. In 1977, after a municipal vote, Stafford schools broke away from the Fort Bend Independent School District, which caused several rounds of federal litigation and by 1981 it was finally declared that the Stafford Municipal School District was constitutional. Almost all of Stafford was in the Fort Bend District, with a minuscule portion in the Houston Independent School District. All of Stafford is now zoned to the Stafford Municipal School District.

== Politics and geography ==
While Stafford MSD took all of the land in the city in 1977 when it was created, Stafford MSD cannot annex any territory without the consent of the other school districts which own that territory. Because of this, the City of Stafford, for a period of over 20 years ending in 2006, did not annex any territory in its extraterritorial jurisdiction as that would mean portions of its territory would fall within these independent school districts: Alief, Ft. Bend, and Houston. The city government of Stafford wants its school district's territory to be the same as its city limits.

== Administration ==
=== Superintendent ===
The current superintendent of the Stafford Municipal School District is Robert Bostic. Before being appointed superintendent, Bostic was the Assistant Superintendent for Academic Programs for Denton Independent School District.

== Schools ==
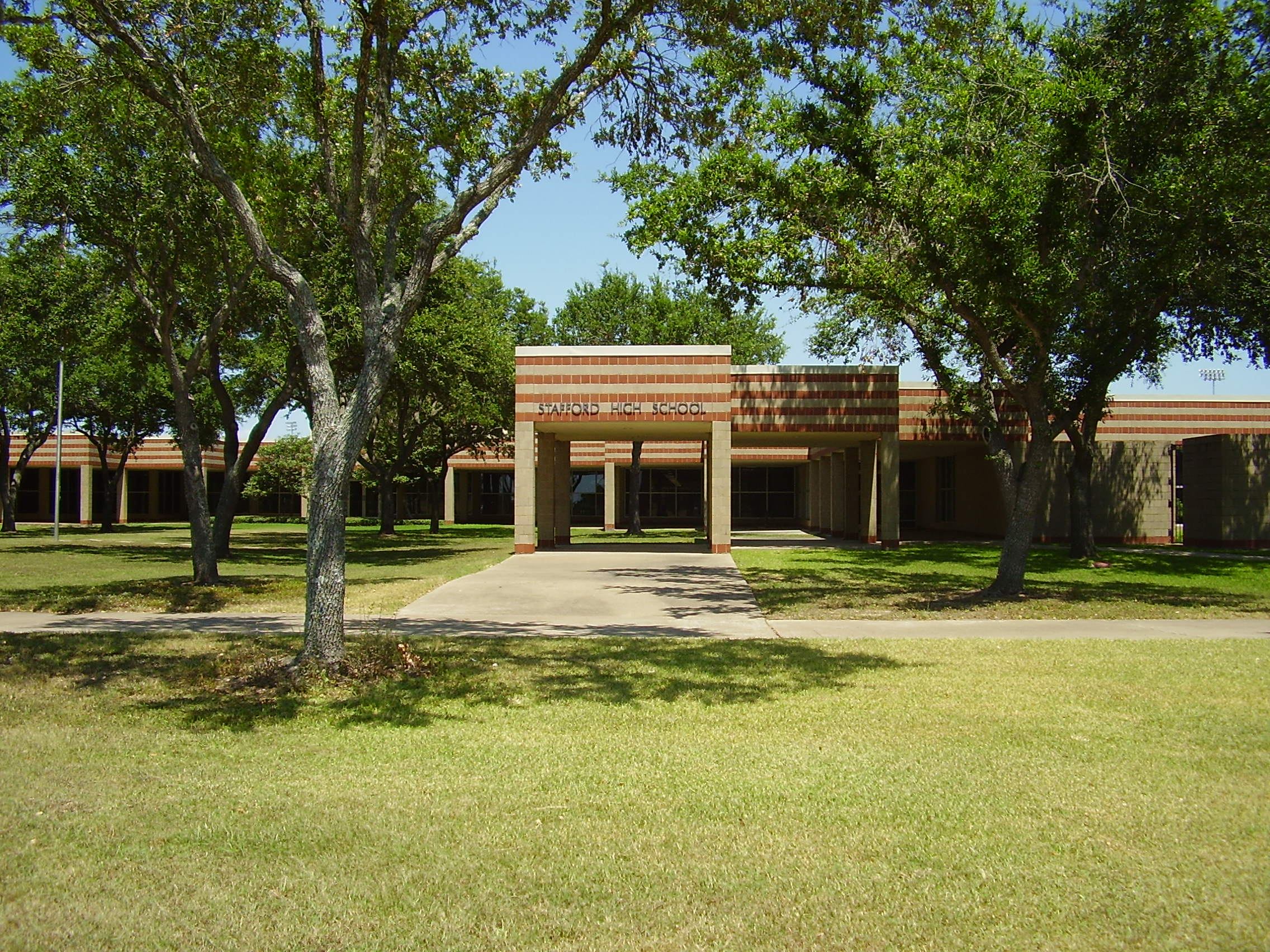
Stafford High School

- Stafford High School
- Stafford Middle School
- Stafford Elementary School
- Stafford Early Childhood Center (SECC) (infants-Kindergarten)
- Stafford MSD STEM Magnet School (SSMA)

The school board approved a stricter dress code for the high school in 2005.

Former divisions

- Previously schools were divided as such: Stafford Primary School (Early education to grade 1), Stafford Elementary School (2-4), Stafford Intermediate School (5-6), and Stafford Middle School (7-8), and then the high school.

== Athletics ==
In 2014 the district was considering whether it should install artificial turf in its sports fields. At the time it had residual funds from a $49.8 million bond passed in 2011. As of 2016 the school district has had artificial turf inside its stadium.

== Notable alumni ==
- Boris Anyama, football player
- Adrian Awasom, football player
- Jalen Pitre, football player
- Craig Robertson, football player
- Dylan Smith, baseball player

== See also ==
- List of school districts in Texas
