= Fifth Street, Texas =

- Census-designated place
- Coordinates: 29°35′53″N 95°33′4″W
- Country: United States
- State: Texas
- County: Fort Bend

Area
  - Total: 0.81 sq mi (2.09 km^{2})
  - Land: 0.79 sq mi (2.05 km^{2})
  - Water: 0.015 sq mi (0.04 km^{2})
- Elevation: 76 ft (23 m)

Population (2020)
  - Total: 2,284
  - Density: 2,890/sq mi (1,110/km^{2})
- Time zone: UTC-6 (Central (CST))
  - Summer (DST): UTC-5 (CDT)
- ZIP code: 77477 (Stafford)
- FIPS code: 48-25795
- GNIS feature ID: 1852706

Fifth Street is a census-designated place (CDP) located in the extraterritorial jurisdiction of Stafford within Fort Bend County, Texas, United States. The population was 2,284 at the 2020 census. Fifth Street is within the ZIP code 77477. Therefore, residents of Fifth Street have an address of Stafford, Texas.

== History ==
By the 1980s, the development or at minimum, the name "Fifth Street" existed. In 2000, it had 2,059 residents. It is a bedroom community of Houston.

== Geography ==
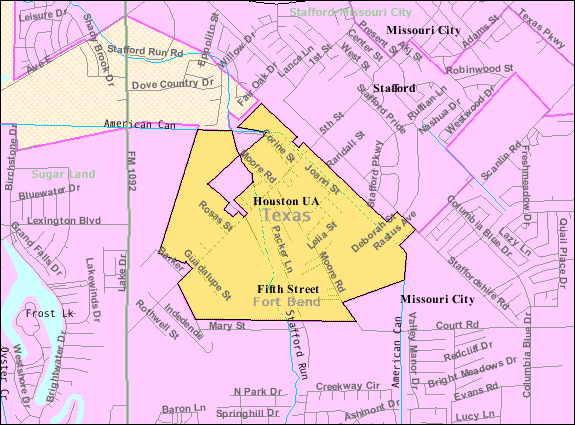
Map of the Fifth Street CDP

Fifth Street is in northeastern Fort Bend County, near the border with Harris County and between Missouri City and Stafford. Downtown Houston is 20 miles (32 km) to the northeast.

Fifth Street is located at 29°35′56″N 95°32′57″W. According to the United States Census Bureau, the CDP has a total area of 0.81 square miles (2.1 km^{2}), of which 0.02 square miles (0.04 km^{2}), or 1.86%, is water.

== Demographics ==
Historical population
Census	Pop.	Note	%±
2000	2,059		—
2010	2,486		20.7%
2020	2,284		−8.1%
U.S. Decennial Census; 1850–1900 1910; 1920 1930 1940; 1950 1960 1970; 1980 1990 2000; 2010 2020

Fifth Street first appeared as a census designated place in the 2000 U.S. census.

=== 2020 census ===
Fifth Street CDP, Texas – Racial and ethnic composition Note: the US Census treats Hispanic/Latino as an ethnic category. This table excludes Latinos from the racial categories and assigns them to a separate category. Hispanics/Latinos may be of any race.
Race / Ethnicity (NH = Non-Hispanic)	Pop 2000	Pop 2010	Pop 2020	% 2000	% 2010	% 2020
White alone (NH)	90	61	42	4.37%	2.45%	1.84%
Black or African American alone (NH)	104	48	42	5.05%	1.93%	1.84%
Native American or Alaska Native alone (NH)	1	0	3	0.05%	0.00%	0.13%
Asian alone (NH)	2	4	5	0.10%	0.16%	0.22%
Native Hawaiian or Pacific Islander alone (NH)	0	0	0	0.00%	0.00%	0.00%
Other race alone (NH)	0	11	4	0.00%	0.44%	0.18%
Mixed race or Multiracial (NH)	2	5	6	0.10%	0.20%	0.26%
Hispanic or Latino (any race)	1,860	2,357	2,182	90.34%	94.81%	95.53%
Total	2,059	2,486	2,284	100.00%	100.00%	100.00%

=== 2000 census ===
As of the census of 2000, there were 2,059 people, 503 households, and 422 families residing in the CDP. The population density was 2,536.8 inhabitants per square mile (979.5/km^{2}). There were 537 housing units at an average density of 661.6 per square mile (255.4/km^{2}). The racial makeup of the CDP was 50.90% White, 5.15% African American, 0.15% Native American, 0.10% Asian, 0.05% Pacific Islander, 41.23% from other races, and 2.43% from two or more races. Hispanic or Latino of any race were 90.34% of the population.

There were 503 households, out of which 46.3% had children under the age of 18 living with them, 57.3% were married couples living together, 15.7% had a female householder with no husband present, and 16.1% were non-families. 9.3% of all households were made up of individuals, and 2.4% had someone living alone who was 65 years of age or older. The average household size was 4.09 and the average family size was 4.29.

In the CDP, the population was spread out, with 34.0% under the age of 18, 13.1% from 18 to 24, 32.3% from 25 to 44, 15.6% from 45 to 64, and 5.0% who were 65 years of age or older. The median age was 26 years. For every 100 females, there were 129.5 males. For every 100 females age 18 and over, there were 137.4 males.

The median income for a household in the CDP was $29,773, and the median income for a family was $34,740. Males had a median income of $26,310 versus $17,500 for females. The per capita income for the CDP was $9,697. About 20.4% of families and 21.8% of the population were below the poverty line, including 19.6% of those under age 18 and 22.6% of those age 65 or over.

== Government and infrastructure ==
Fort Bend County does not have a hospital district. OakBend Medical Center serves as the county's charity hospital which the county contracts with.

== Education ==
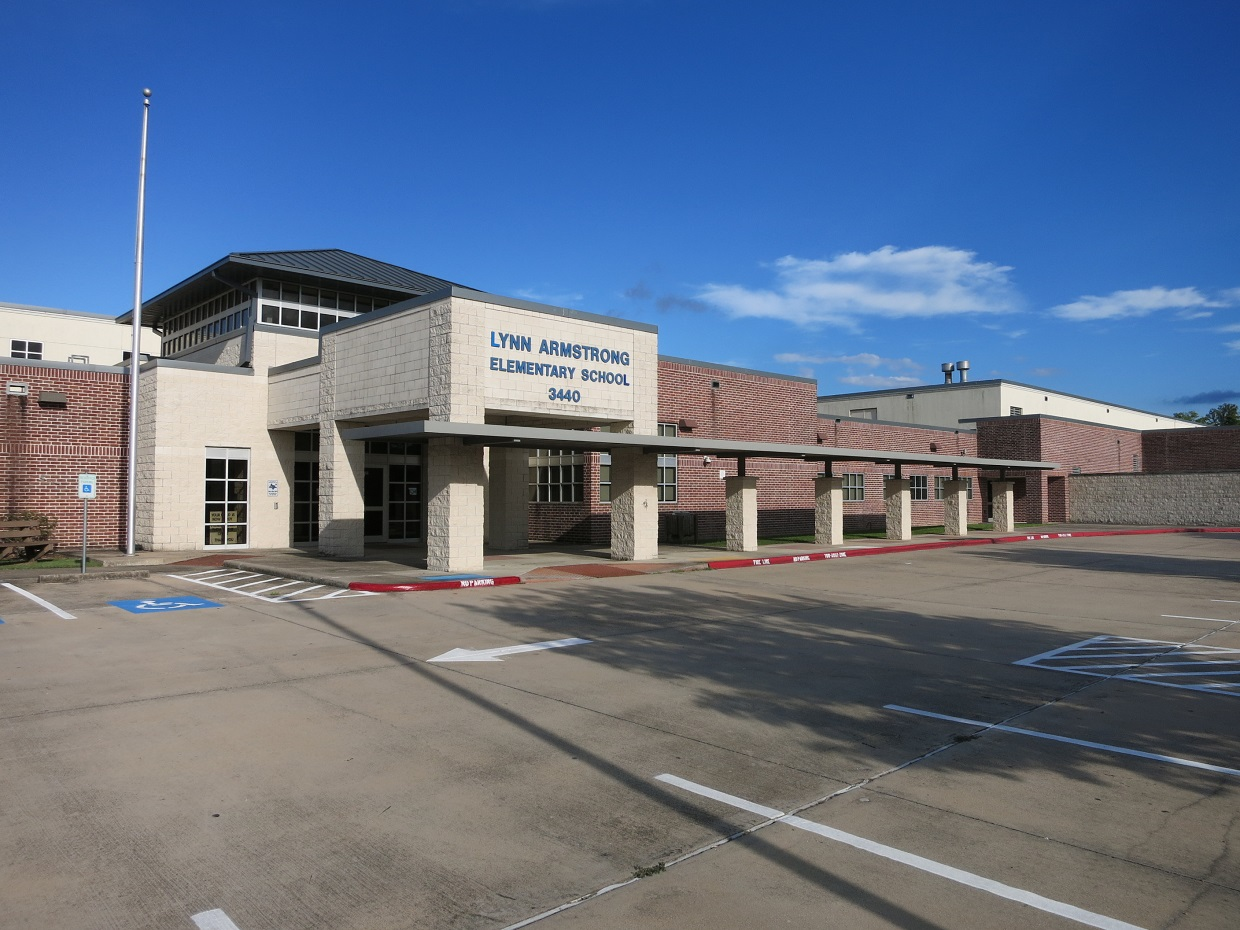
Lynn Armstrong Elementary School in Fifth Street

Fifth Street is within the Fort Bend Independent School District.

Most residents are zoned to: Armstrong Elementary School, while some are zoned to Edgar Glover Elementary School. Two secondary schools in Missouri City, Missouri City Middle School and Thurgood Marshall High School, serve Fifth Street.

Before Armstrong opened in August 2008, Fifth Street was divided between Glover Elementary School, E.A. Jones Elementary School, and Quail Valley Elementary School. In 2008 Armstrong took most of Fifth Street.

Prior to April 18, 1959 an elementary school in Missouri City, now E. A. Jones, existed. Quail Valley Elementary School had been occupied by August 1975. Missouri City Junior High School opened in October 1975. Glover opened on August 17, 1994. Marshall High School opened on August 15, 2002. The rebuilt E. A. Jones opened on August 27, 2007. Armstrong opened on August 25, 2008. The rebuilt Missouri City Middle School opened in August 2008.

The Texas Legislature specifies that the Houston Community College (HCC) boundary includes "the part of the Fort Bend Independent School District that is not located in the service area of the Wharton County Junior College District and that is adjacent to the Houston Community College System District." Wharton College's boundary within FBISD is defined only as the City of Sugar Land and the ETJ of Sugar Land, and Fifth Street is not in the Sugar Land ETJ (it is in the Stafford ETJ). Fifth Street is in HCC.

== Parks and recreation ==
Fort Bend County operates the 5-acre (20,000 m^{2}) Stafford Community Center in Fifth Street.
