= Derek Sage =

American football player and coach (born 1978)

Current position
- Title: Wide Receiver Coach/Special Teams Coordinator
- Team: Washington State
- Conference: PAC-12

Biographical details
- Born: October 11, 1978 (age 48); Ventura County, California, U.S.

Playing career
- 1998–1999: Sacramento CC
- 2000–2001: Cal State Northridge
- Position: Tight end

Coaching career (HC unless noted)
- 2003–2004: Nevada (GA)
- 2005–2009: New Hampshire (WR)
- 2010–2013: Wyoming (WR)
- 2014–2016: Toledo (WR)
- 2017: Washington State (WR)
- 2018: UCLA (TE)
- 2019–2021: UCLA (STC/TE)
- 2022–2023: Nevada (OC/TE)
- 2024–2025: Toledo (TE)
- 2026–present: Washington State (STC/WR)

Derek Robert Sage (born October 11, 1978) is an American football coach. He is the Wide Receivers coach at the Washington State University.

== Early life ==
Sage was born on October 11, 1978, in Ventura County, California. In his high school years, Sage lived in Sparks, Nevada and attended Edward C. Reed High School.

== Playing career ==
Sage played as a tight end for the Sacramento City College football team in the 1998 and 1999 seasons. While Sage was at Sacramento C.C., his team won conference championships and bowl championships. Sage then transferred to Cal State Northridge. He played there as a tight end in 2000 and 2001—the program's final two seasons—and earned his bachelor's degree in kinesiology in 2002.

== Coaching career ==
=== Nevada (First Stint) ===
Sage embarked on his coaching career in 2003 as a graduate assistant at Nevada. He spent two seasons with the program, working with defensive backs in 2003 and with wide receivers in 2004.

=== New Hampshire ===
In 2005, Sage landed his first job as a wide receivers coach at New Hampshire, where he first met Chip Kelly, who was offensive coordinator at the time of Sage's hire. Sage mentored All-American receiver David Ball, who became the NCAA career leader in touchdown receptions, with 58, and amassed 4,655 receiving yards in his collegiate career—a school record for New Hampshire.

=== Wyoming ===
Following a five-year stint at New Hampshire, Sage became the wide receivers coach at Wyoming in 2010. At Wyoming, Sage mentored future NFL Draft pick Robert Herron. Sage coached four all-conference receivers during his time with the Cowboys, which lasted from 2010 to 2013.

=== Toledo ===
In 2014, Sage became the wide receivers coach at Toledo, where he coached for three seasons. In 2016, Sage's third and final season with the Rockets, Sage oversaw a receiving corps that featured two All-Mid-American Conference receivers. The Rockets ranked seventh in the NCAA in total offense that season, averaging 517.8 yards of offense per game. The Rockets' passing offense that season averaged 322.8 yards per game, which was an improvement of over 88 yards per game from Sage's first season (2014).

=== Washington State ===
Sage accepted his first Power Five job in 2017, becoming the inside receivers coach at Washington State, which ran an air raid offense under head coach Mike Leach. The Cougars' passing offense ranked second in the nation and first in the Pac-12 Conference in 2017, with 366.8 yards per game, and it led the Pac-12 in touchdown passes.

=== UCLA ===
In 2018, Sage reunited with Chip Kelly when he was hired as the tight ends coach at UCLA. In his inaugural season at UCLA, Sage mentored future NFL Draft pick Caleb Wilson, who led the nation's tight ends in receptions per game, receiving yards per game, and total receiving yards. His 965 receiving yards on the season were the most ever for a UCLA tight end.

In 2019, Sage stayed on as tight ends coach and assumed responsibilities as the team's special teams coordinator following the departure of special teams coordinator Roy Manning.

=== Nevada (Second Stint) ===
Following the 2021 season, Sage joined Ken Wilson's inaugural staff at Nevada as the offensive coordinator.

=== Toledo (Second Stint) ===
Following the 2023 season, Sage was hired to be the Tight Ends coach at the University of Toledo under Jason Candle.

== Personal life ==
Sage is married to Mandy Sage (née Jeskey), with whom he has a daughter, Piper, and a son, Casen.
