= Dalevon Campbell =

American football player (born 2001)

Profile
- Position: Wide receiver

Personal information
- Born: December 5, 2001 (age 24); Houston, Texas, U.S.
- Listed height: 6 ft 4 in (1.93 m)
- Listed weight: 220 lb (100 kg)

Career information
- High school: Fort Bend Marshall (Missouri City, Texas)
- College: Illinois (2019–2021); Nevada (2022–2023); South Carolina (2024)
- NFL draft: 2025: undrafted

Career history
- Los Angeles Chargers (2025)*; Carolina Panthers (2025); Los Angeles Chargers (2025)
- * Offseason or practice squad member only

Career NFL statistics
- Games played: 2
- Stats at Pro Football Reference

Dalevon Campbell (born December 5, 2001) is an American professional football wide receiver. He played college football for the Illinois Fighting Illini, Nevada Wolf Pack and South Carolina Gamecocks and was signed by the Los Angeles Chargers as an undrafted free agent in 2025.

== Early life ==
Campbell was born on December 5, 2001. He attended Fort Bend Marshall High School in Missouri City, Texas, where he played football as a wide receiver and helped his team to the Region III-5A Division II title. He recorded 25 receptions for 545 yards and seven touchdowns in his senior season at Marshall. Campbell also competed in track and field, being a part of the state championship team in the 4 × 200 metres relay. He committed to play college football for the Illinois Fighting Illini.

== College career ==
Campbell appeared in five games for Illinois as a freshman in 2019 and redshirted. He then recorded three receptions for 48 yards during the 2020 season, followed by three catches for 50 yards in 11 games in 2021. Campbell transferred to the Nevada Wolf Pack in 2022 and caught 39 passes for 467 yards and a touchdown that year. In 2023, he was named honorable mention All-Mountain West Conference (MW) after catching 31 passes for a team-leading 594 receiving yards and two touchdowns. Campbell transferred to the South Carolina Gamecocks for his final season in 2024. With the Gamecocks, he caught 12 passes for 312 yards, with his average of 26 yards-per-catch being best on the team.

== Professional career ==
Pre-draft measurables
| Height | Weight | Arm length | Hand span | Wingspan | 40-yard dash | 10-yard split | 20-yard split | 20-yard shuttle | Three-cone drill | Vertical jump | Broad jump | Bench press |
|---|---|---|---|---|---|---|---|---|---|---|---|---|
| 6 ft 2 7/8 in (1.90 m) | 219 lb (99 kg) | 32 in (0.81 m) | 9 7/8 in (0.25 m) | 6 ft 5 5/8 in (1.97 m) | 4.40 s | 1.51 s | 2.58 s | 4.66 s | 7.38 s | 35.0 in (0.89 m) | 10 ft 5 in (3.18 m) | 17 reps |
All values from Pro Day

=== Los Angeles Chargers ===
After going unselected in the 2025 NFL draft, Campbell signed with the Los Angeles Chargers as an undrafted free agent following a successful tryout. Despite leading the team with eight receptions for 147 yards during the preseason, he was waived on August 26, 2025.

=== Carolina Panthers ===
On August 27, 2025, one day after being waived by the Chargers, Campbell was claimed off waivers by the Carolina Panthers. He was waived on September 30 with an injury designation and reverted to injured reserve the next day. Campbell was released on October 10.

=== Los Angeles Chargers (second stint) ===
On October 15, 2025, Campbell signed with the Los Angeles Chargers' practice squad. On December 8, he was elevated to the active roster. Campbell signed a reserve/futures contract with Los Angeles on January 13, 2026.

On August 30, 2026, Campbell was waived/injured by the Chargers.
