= Ken Wilson (American football) =

American football player and coach (born 1964)

Current position
- Title: Linebackers coach
- Team: TCU
- Conference: Big 12

Biographical details
- Born: February 17, 1964 (age 62); Virginia, Illinois, U.S.

Playing career

Football
- 1982–1985: North Central

Baseball
- 1983–1986: North Central
- Positions: Tight end, linebacker (football); First baseman (baseball)

Coaching career (HC unless noted)

Football
- 1986: North Central (GA)
- 1987–1988: New Mexico (GA)
- 1989–1990: Nevada (OLB/DE)
- 1991–1995: Nevada (ILB)
- 1996–1998: Nevada (DC/ILB)
- 2004–2006: Nevada (AHC/LB)
- 2007: Nevada (DC/S)
- 2008–2009: Nevada (AHC/LB)
- 2010–2011: Nevada (AHC/DE)
- 2012: Nevada (AHC/LB)
- 2013–2019: Washington State (LB)
- 2020: Oregon (LB)
- 2021: Oregon (co-DC/ILB)
- 2022–2023: Nevada
- 2024–present: TCU (LB)

Administrative career (AD unless noted)
- 1999–2003: Nevada (associate AD)

Head coaching record
- Overall: 4–20

William Kenneth Wilson (born February 17, 1964) is an American college football coach who serves as the linebackers coach at TCU a position he has held since 2024. He served as the head football coach at the University of Nevada from 2022 to 2023. Before becoming the head coach, he coached as an assistant at Nevada for 19 seasons, from 1989 to 1998 and 2004 to 2012.

== Coaching career ==
=== Assistant at Nevada ===
Wilson began coaching at Nevada in 1989. He spent a total of 19 seasons as an assistant coach there in two stints, from 1989 to 1998 and 2004 to 2012. In between he worked as an associate athletic director for Nevada. At Nevada he coached throughout the defense, while serving as defensive coordinator for four seasons. From 1996 to 1998 Wilson was the youngest NCAA Division I defensive coordinator.

=== Washington State ===
From 2013 to 2019, Wilson worked as the linebackers coach under Mike Leach at Washington State University.

=== Oregon ===
In 2020, Wilson joined the staff at the University of Oregon as linebackers coach. In 2021, he signed a new contract and was given the title of co-defensive coordinator while coaching the inside linebackers.

=== Head coach at Nevada ===
After spending nine seasons away from Nevada, Wilson was confirmed to be returning to the university on December 10, 2021, as head coach. Nevada fired Wilson following the 2023 season. Over two years Wilson posted a 4–20 record.

=== TCU ===
On January 16, 2024, Wilson joined the staff at Texas Christian University as the linebackers coach.

== Personal life ==
Wilson and his wife, Heather, have a son, Tyler, who played football at Nevada, and a daughter, Baylie.

== Head coaching record ==
Year	Team	Overall	Conference	Standing	Bowl/playoffs
Nevada Wolf Pack (Mountain West Conference) (2022–2023)
2022	Nevada	2–10	0–8	6th (West)	
2023	Nevada	2–10	2–6	T–10th	
Nevada:		4–20	2–14		
Total:		4–20			
