= Stafford, Texas =

- City
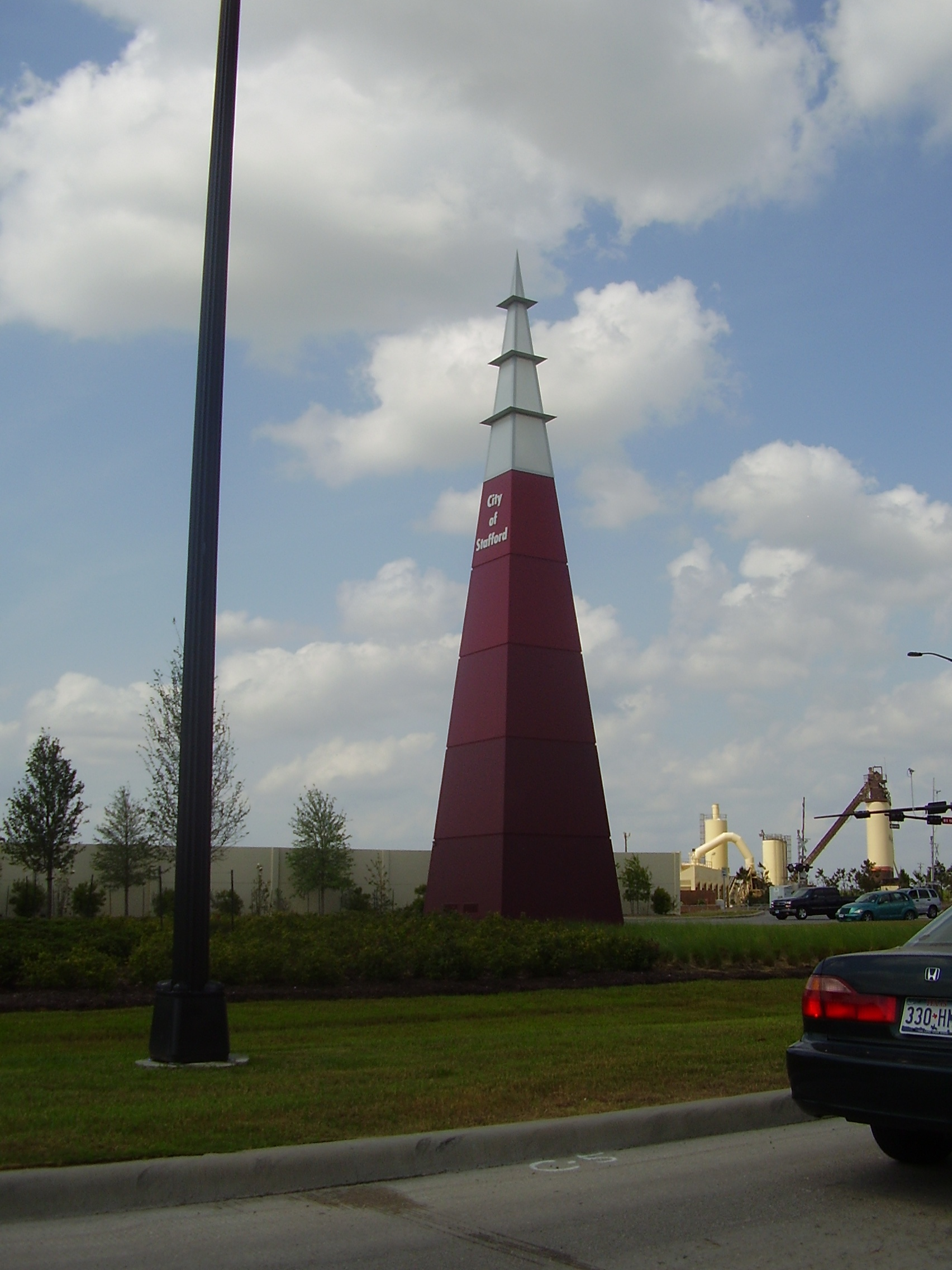
- Monument on US 90 Alternate
- Motto: "City with no property taxes"
- Location of Stafford, Texas

- Location within Texas Location within the United States
- Coordinates: 29°37′27″N 95°33′48″W
- Country: United States
- State: Texas
- Counties: Fort Bend, Harris

Government
  - Type: Mayor-Council
  - Mayor: Ken Matthew
  - City Council: Virginia Rosas; Alice Chen; Ken Mathew; Wen Guerra; Xavier Herrera; William K. Bostic Jr. Tim Wood

Area
  - Total: 7.04 sq mi (18.24 km^{2})
  - Land: 7.01 sq mi (18.16 km^{2})
  - Water: 0.035 sq mi (0.09 km^{2})
- Elevation: 85 ft (26 m)

Population (2020)
  - Total: 17,666
  - Density: 2,476.3/sq mi (956.11/km^{2})
- Time zone: UTC-06:00 (CST)
  - Summer (DST): UTC-05:00 (CDT)
- ZIP codes: 77477, 77497
- Area code: 281
- FIPS code: 48-69908
- GNIS feature ID: 1347777
- Website: www.staffordtx.gov

Stafford is a city in the U.S. state of Texas, in the Houston–Pasadena–The Woodlands metropolitan area. The city is mostly in Fort Bend County, with a small part in Harris County. As of the 2020 census, Stafford's population was 17,666, down from 17,693 at the 2010 census.

== History ==
William Stafford established a plantation with a cane mill and a horse-powered cotton gin in 1830. On April 15, 1836, during the Texas Revolution, the forces of Antonio López de Santa Anna stopped at Stafford's plantation and ordered it burned. Stafford rebuilt his plantation and resided there until his 1840 death. A settlement called "Stafford's Point" was established around the plantation; it became a townsite in August 1853, when the Buffalo Bayou, Brazos and Colorado Railway began stopping there. Stafford's Point had a post office from 1854 to 1869. "Staffordville" had a post office from January 5 to February 26, 1869. The settlement, now known as Stafford, operated a post office from 1869 to 1918; the post office reopened in 1929.

In 1884, Stafford had 50 residents, two general stores, and a grocer. By 1896, it had a population of 300. By 1914, the population fell to 100. In 1931, 320 people lived in Stafford. This increased to 400 in 1946. Stafford incorporated as a city in 1956.

== Geography ==
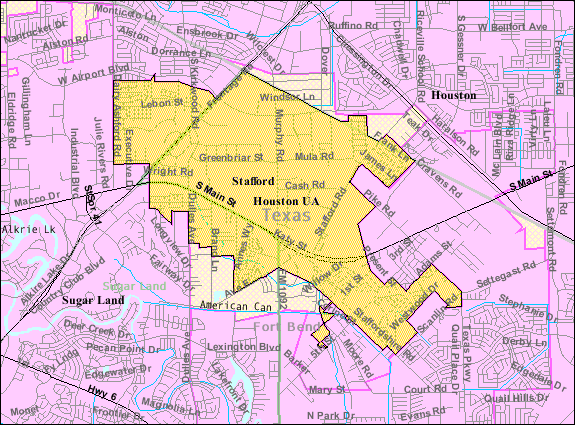
Map of Stafford

Stafford is in eastern Fort Bend County at 29°37′27″N 95°33′48″W (29.624186, –95.563359). A small part of the city extends northeast into Harris County. It is bordered by Houston to the north, Meadows Place to the northwest, Sugar Land to the west, and Missouri City to the south and east.

The Southwest Freeway (Interstate 69) passes through northwest Stafford, leading northeast 16 miles (26 km) to the center of Houston and southwest 18 miles (29 km) to Rosenberg. U.S. 90 Alternate passes through Stafford as Main Street, leading west 5 miles (8 km) to Sugar Land and northeast 18 miles (29 km) to the Houston East End.

According to the United States Census Bureau, Stafford has an area of 7.0 square miles (18.2 km^{2}), of which 7.0 square miles (18.1 km^{2}) is land and 0.04 square miles (0.1 km^{2}), or 0.58%, is water.

=== Climate ===
Stafford's climate is characterized by hot, humid summers and generally mild to cool winters. According to the Köppen climate classification system, Stafford has a humid subtropical climate, Cfa on climate maps.

=== Extraterritorial jurisdiction ===
Stafford has two areas of extraterritorial jurisdiction. They are within the Houston Independent School District, including an area at Beltway 8 and Stafford Road and another area between Beltway 8 and Murphy Road. One area within the Alief Independent School District is next to the City of Meadows Place along Interstate 69/U.S. Route 59. Areas in the Fort Bend Independent School District include part of Fifth Street and an area around U.S. Route 90 Alternate, Dulles Avenue, and Avenue E. The City of Stafford has avoided annexing these areas, because doing so would give it territory in school districts other than the Stafford Municipal School District (SMSD) and the city wants its city limits and the SMSD to have the same area. The SMSD cannot annex these areas without the other school districts' permission.

== Demographics ==
Historical population
Census	Pop.	Note	%±
1960	1,485		—
1970	2,906		95.7%
1980	4,755		63.6%
1990	8,397		76.6%
2000	15,681		86.7%
2010	17,693		12.8%
2020	17,666		−0.2%
U.S. Decennial Census

=== Racial and ethnic composition ===
Stafford city, Texas – Racial and ethnic composition Note: the US Census treats Hispanic/Latino as an ethnic category. This table excludes Latinos from the racial categories and assigns them to a separate category. Hispanics/Latinos may be of any race.
Race / Ethnicity (NH = Non-Hispanic)	Pop 2000	Pop 2010	Pop 2020	% 2000	% 2010	% 2020
White alone (NH)	5,590	3,972	2,858	35.65%	22.45%	16.18%
Black or African American alone (NH)	2,905	4,740	5,239	18.53%	26.79%	29.66%
Native American or Alaska Native alone (NH)	45	42	27	0.29%	0.24%	0.15%
Asian alone (NH)	3,086	4,000	3,849	19.68%	22.61%	21.79%
Native Hawaiian or Pacific Islander alone (NH)	8	6	19	0.05%	0.03%	0.11%
Other race alone (NH)	40	50	110	0.26%	0.28%	0.62%
Mixed race or Multiracial (NH)	354	293	449	2.26%	1.66%	2.54%
Hispanic or Latino (any race)	3,653	4,590	5,115	23.30%	25.94%	28.95%
Total	15,681	17,693	17,666	100.00%	100.00%	100.00%

=== 2020 census ===
As of the 2020 census, Stafford had a population of 17,666. The median age was 35.3 years. 22.4% of residents were under the age of 18 and 12.0% of residents were 65 years of age or older. For every 100 females there were 94.5 males, and for every 100 females age 18 and over there were 91.9 males age 18 and over.

100.0% of residents lived in urban areas, while 0.0% lived in rural areas.

There were 6,805 households in Stafford, of which 33.0% had children under the age of 18 living in them. Of all households, 41.8% were married-couple households, 22.0% were households with a male householder and no spouse or partner present, and 30.8% were households with a female householder and no spouse or partner present. About 28.3% of all households were made up of individuals and 6.2% had someone living alone who was 65 years of age or older.

There were 7,408 housing units, of which 8.1% were vacant. The homeowner vacancy rate was 0.9% and the rental vacancy rate was 10.6%.

Racial composition as of the 2020 census
Race	Number	Percent
White	3,825	21.7%
Black or African American	5,322	30.1%
American Indian and Alaska Native	151	0.9%
Asian	3,864	21.9%
Native Hawaiian and Other Pacific Islander	21	0.1%
Some other race	2,309	13.1%
Two or more races	2,174	12.3%
Hispanic or Latino (of any race)	5,115	29.0%

=== 2010 census ===
As of the census of 2010, 17,693 people, 6,750 households, and 4,483 families resided in the city. The population density was 2,527.6 inhabitants per square mile (975.9/km^{2}). The 7,074 housing units averaged 1,010.6 units per square mile (390.2 units/km^{2}). The racial makeup of the city was 36.6% White, 27.4% African American, 0.6% Native American, 22.8% Asian, 0.0% Pacific Islander, 9.3% some other race, and 3.2% from two or more races. Hispanics or Latinos of any race were 25.9% of the population.

Of the 6,750 households, 33.2% had children under 18 living with them, 45.1% were married couples living together, 16.3% had a female householder with no husband present, and 33.6% were not families. About 27.9% of all households were made up of individuals living alone, and 4.8% of individuals living alone were 65 or older. The average household size was 2.62 and the average family size was 3.25.

In the city, the population was distributed as 24.8% under 18, 10.8% from 18 to 24, 32.7% from 25 to 44, 24.4% from 45 to 64, and 7% 65 or older. The median age was 31.9. For every 100 females, there were 94.5 males. For every 100 females 18 and over, there were 90.9 males.

The median income for a household was $61,084, and for a family was $63,244. Males had a median income of $46,023 versus $40,549 for females. The per capita income was $27,082. About 6.3% of families and 9.0% of the population were below the poverty line, including 10.4% of those under 18 and 9.3% of those 65 or older.

== Economy ==
Stafford has not had a municipal property tax since 1995. Though it is known as a bedroom community of the greater Houston area, an estimated four times as many people work in Stafford on a weekday, which is evidence of the large amount of commercial activity that helps the city financially.

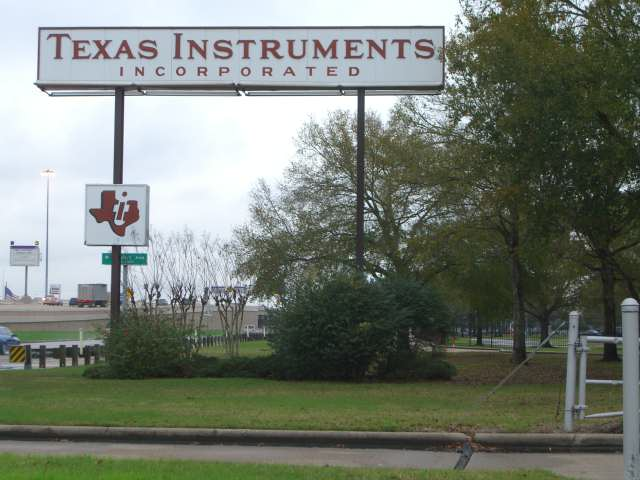
Texas Instruments facility in Stafford: Texas Instruments was Stafford's largest employer.

Originally, Stafford was an agricultural community, but through modern history has operations from commercial, manufacturing, retail, service, and wholesale industries that pay sales and franchise taxes to the city.

Texas Instruments (TI) operated a production facility in Stafford, where it manufactured 6-inch (150 mm) wafers used in cell phones, high-definition televisions, and solar devices. The plant first opened in 1967. In 2009, TI, which had around 1,500 employees in its Stafford office that year, was the city's largest employer. In 2012, the company announced it was closing its Stafford plant because industry demand for larger, more efficient wafers increased and the company, in lieu of upgrading the Stafford plant to accommodate production of larger wafers, opted to shift production to newer plants. Of the 1,000 employees at the plant during that year, TI laid off 500 and sent 500 to another facility. Mayor Leonard Scarcella said the closure would adversely affect Stafford.

About 20 years ago, TI comprised about 25% of the city's economy and by 2012, it stood at about one-tenth of that, or 2.5%. Some jobs at the plant were scheduled to end in July 2012. Other jobs were scheduled to remain until the factory's closure in late 2012. TI said it planned to open another facility in greater Houston for the 500 remaining employees. In 2012, TI announced that it was relocating its Fort Bend County operations to the Telfair area in Sugar Land.

== Parks and recreation ==
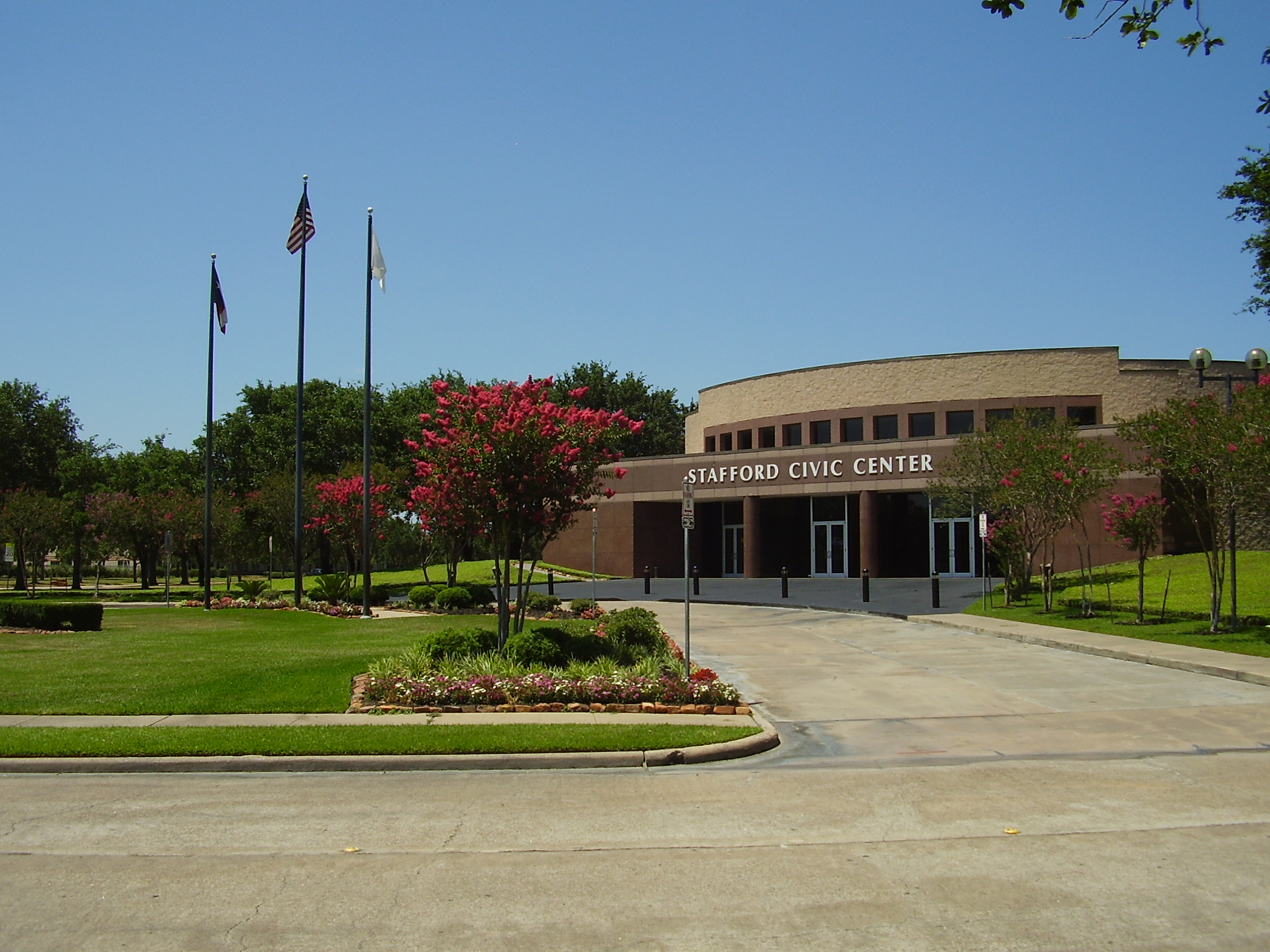
Stafford Civic Center

About 35.6 acres (144,000 m^{2}) of greenspace in Stafford are designated as municipal parks. Stafford City Park, the largest, covers 16 acres (65,000 m^{2}) of land. The park includes baseball and softball fields, basketball courts, a pavilion, playground equipment, picnic benches, and soccer (football)/open fields. Gordon Fountain Lake Park, covering 9 acres (36,000 m^{2}), is Stafford's second-largest park. It has a 1/2-mile, lighted, jogging trail, a lake, a pavilion, picnic benches, and playground equipment. The 4.5-acre (18,000 m^{2}) Vaccaro Manor Park has a lighted, quarter-mile jogging trail, a pavilion, playground equipment, sidewalks, and soccer/open fields. The 3.14-acre (12,700 m^{2}) Rubin Park has playground equipment and picnic benches. First Street Park has 3 acres (12,000 m^{2}) of land and includes baseball/softball fields, a jogging trail, lighting, and picnic benches. The Margaret Havens Historical Memorial Garden is next to Stafford City Hall. Its rose garden, benches, and fountain have attracted many couples to marry there. Stafford operates a Civic Center and a City Pool in the Municipal Complex. City residents pay $15 a year for pool access. The Stafford Centre Performing Arts Theatre and Convention Centre has a 1,100-seat performing arts theater; 25,000 square feet of meeting, banquet, and exposition space, including a 20,000-ft^{2} ballroom; and over 28 acres of outdoor festival green space.

Fort Bend County operates the 5-acre (20,000 m^{2}) Stafford Community Center in Fifth Street, an unincorporated area near Stafford.

In 2014 the Sugar Land Youth Cricket Club, a children's cricket club, was established. In 2016 it played its home games at Everest Academy in Stafford.

== Government and infrastructure ==
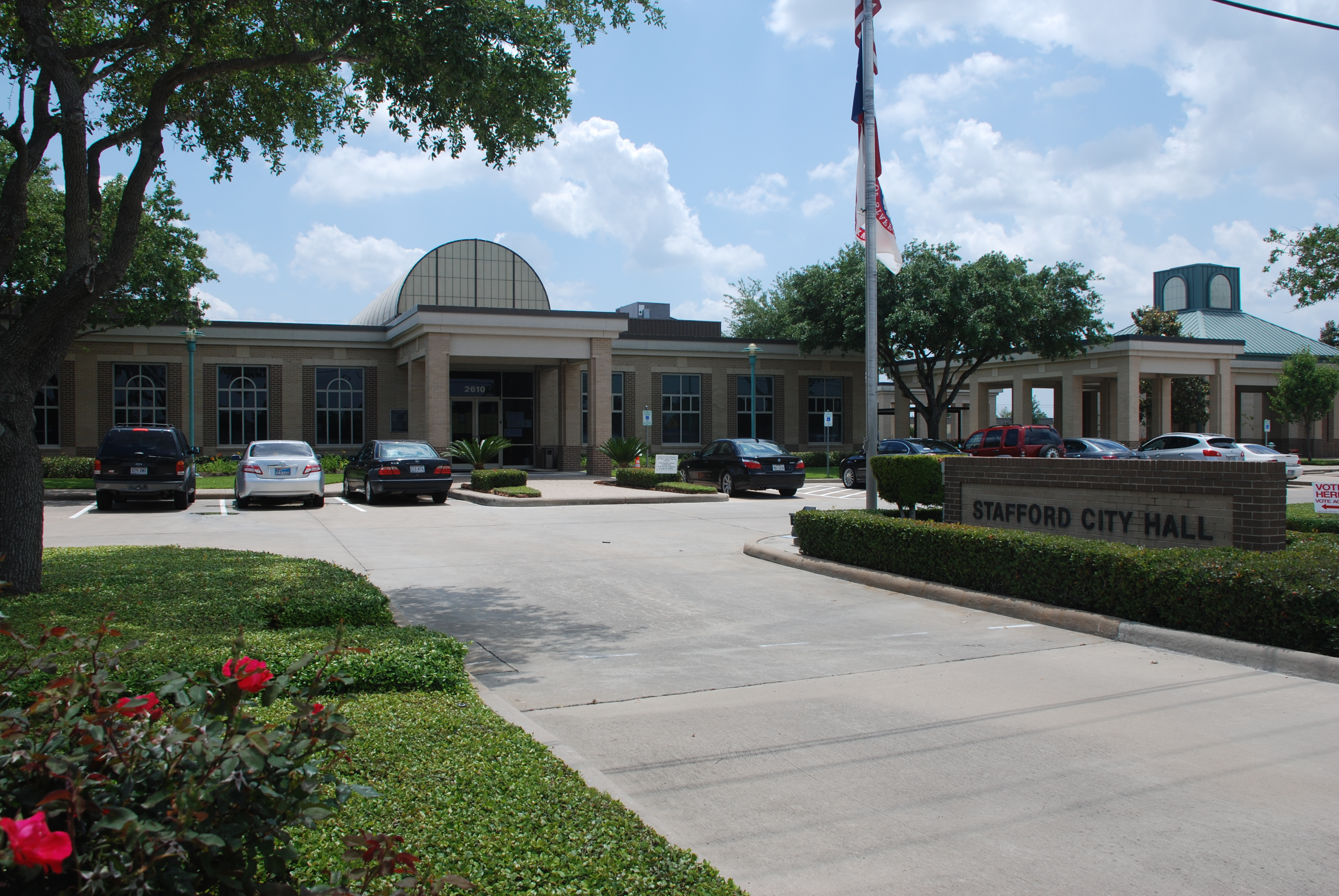
Stafford City Hall

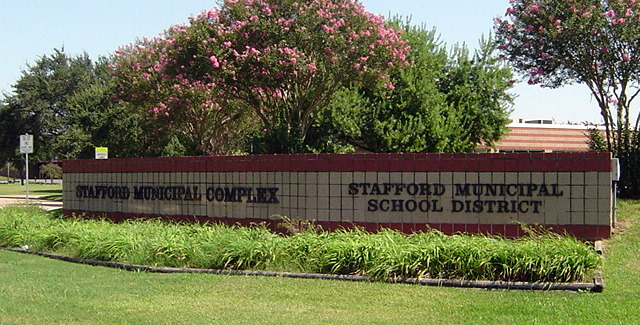
The Stafford Municipal Complex is located in the southern part of the city off Staffordshire Road at Constitution Avenue.

=== Local government ===
The City of Stafford stopped levying nonschool property taxes in 1995. It is the only Houston-area city and the most populous city in Texas to do so. Sales and franchise taxes from businesses fund the city.

From 1969 to 2020, Stafford's mayor was Leonard Scarcella. By 2018, he was the longest-serving mayor in the United States. On June 28, 2020, Scarcella died at age 79. In December 2020, Cecil Willis was elected mayor. In June 2023, Ken Matthew was elected mayor.

The Stafford City Hall, Stafford Police Department, and Municipal Court buildings are on South Main, adjacent to one another. The Stafford Volunteer Fire Department operates out of three fire stations.

The city is governed by its Home Rule Charter. The most recent review was in 2018. The commission consisted of:

Ash Hamirani

Jonathan Montoya

Hector Acevedo

Christeen Seymour

Lawrence Vaccaro Jr.

Vice Chairperson Ettienne Zak

Chairperson Robert Sorbet

=== County, state, and federal representation ===
Stafford is partly in Fort Bend County and partly in Harris County. Residents pay property taxes to their respective counties.

Harris County Precinct One, headed by Commissioner Rodney Ellis, serves the section of Stafford in Harris County.

Much of Stafford is in District 26 of the Texas House of Representatives. As of 2012, Charlie Howard represents the district. Some of Stafford is in District 27 of the Texas House of Representatives. As of 2012, Ron Reynolds represents the district. Most of Stafford is in District 13 of the Texas Senate, represented by Borris L. Miles. Some of Stafford is in District 17 of the Texas Senate, represented by Joan Huffman.

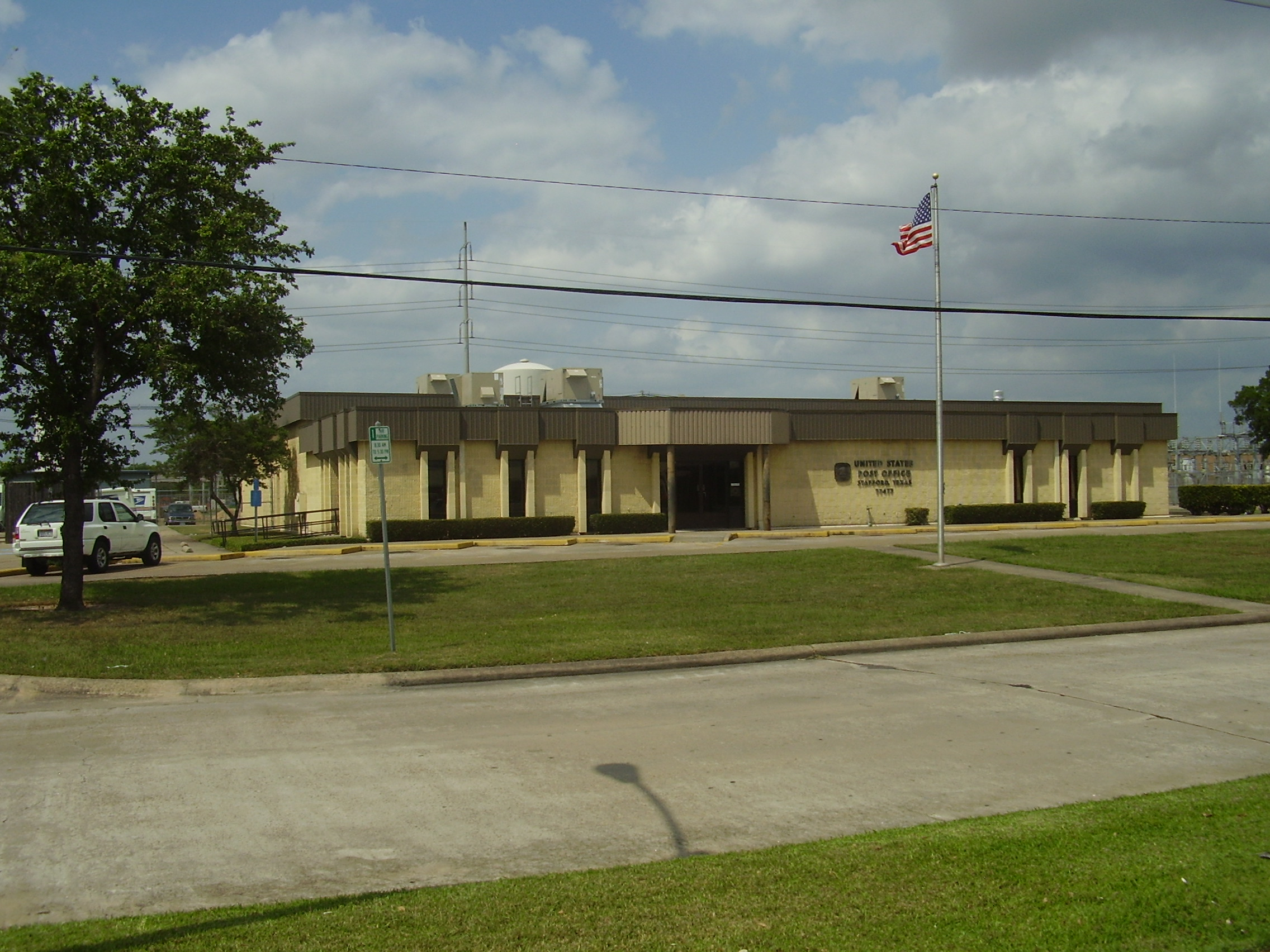
Stafford Post Office

Stafford is in Texas's 22nd congressional district. As of 2021, Troy Nehls represents the district.

The U.S. Postal Service operates the Stafford Post Office. Some locations in Houston have Stafford mailing addresses.

Fort Bend County does not have a hospital district. OakBend Medical Center serves as the county's charity hospital which the county contracts with. Harris County has a hospital district, Harris Health.

== Media ==
The Houston Chronicle is the area's newspaper of record.

== Culture ==
BAPS Shri Swaminarayan Mandir is in unincorporated Fort Bend County, Texas, within the extraterritorial jurisdiction (ETJ) of Stafford and with a Stafford mailing address.

=== Annual Juneteenth Festival ===
Stafford, Texas hosts an annual Juneteenth Celebration, first launched in 2022 by former City Council Member Don Jones.

== Education ==
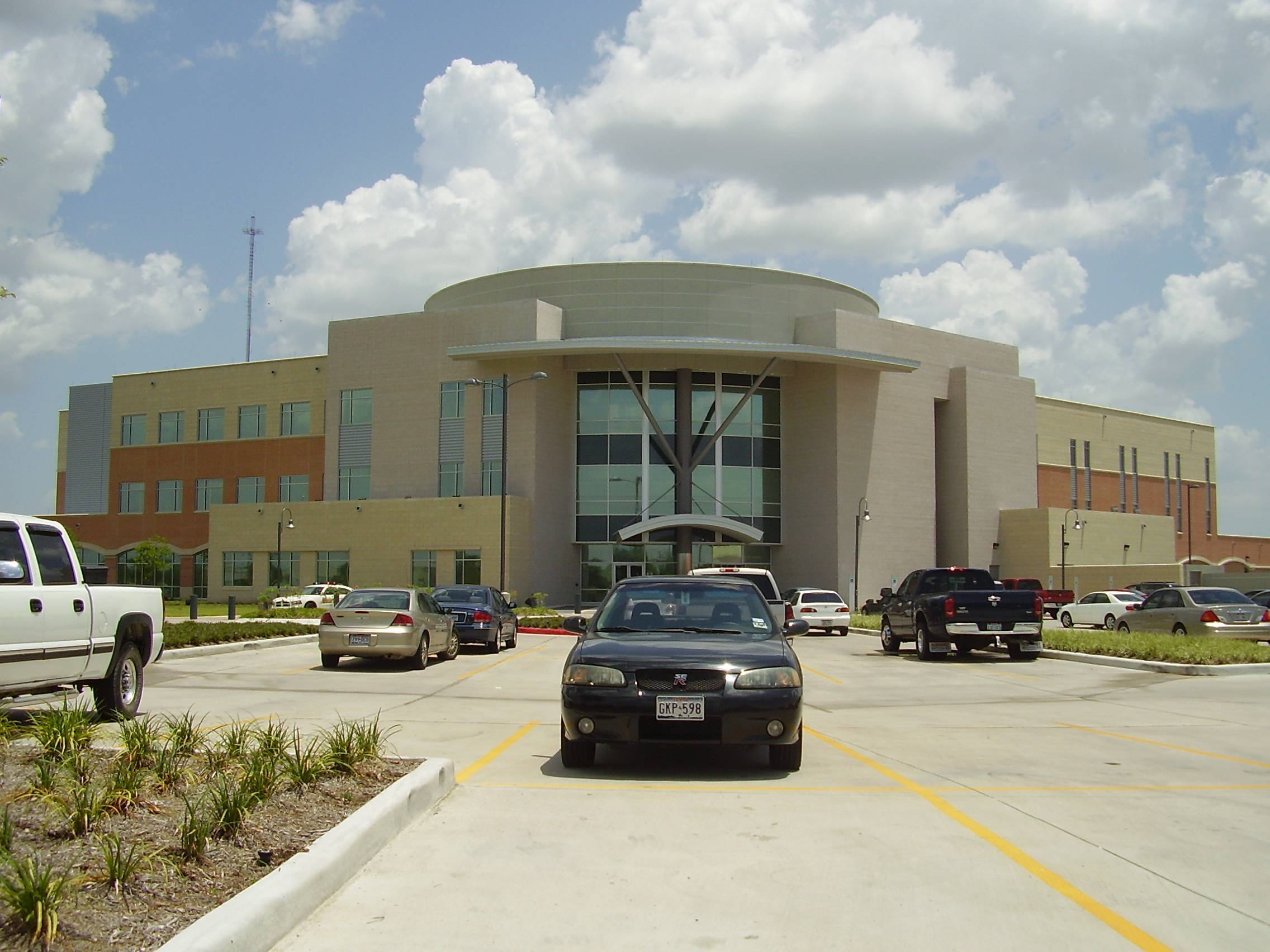
Houston Community College System Stafford building

=== Colleges and universities ===
Stafford MSD (and therefore the city) is served by the Houston City College System. The HCCS Southwest College includes the Stafford Campus at 10041 Cash Road. In spring 2012, the enrollment at the Stafford Campus was 8,139. Stafford is also home to North American University, a small private university with an enrollment of roughly 800 students.

=== Primary and secondary schools ===
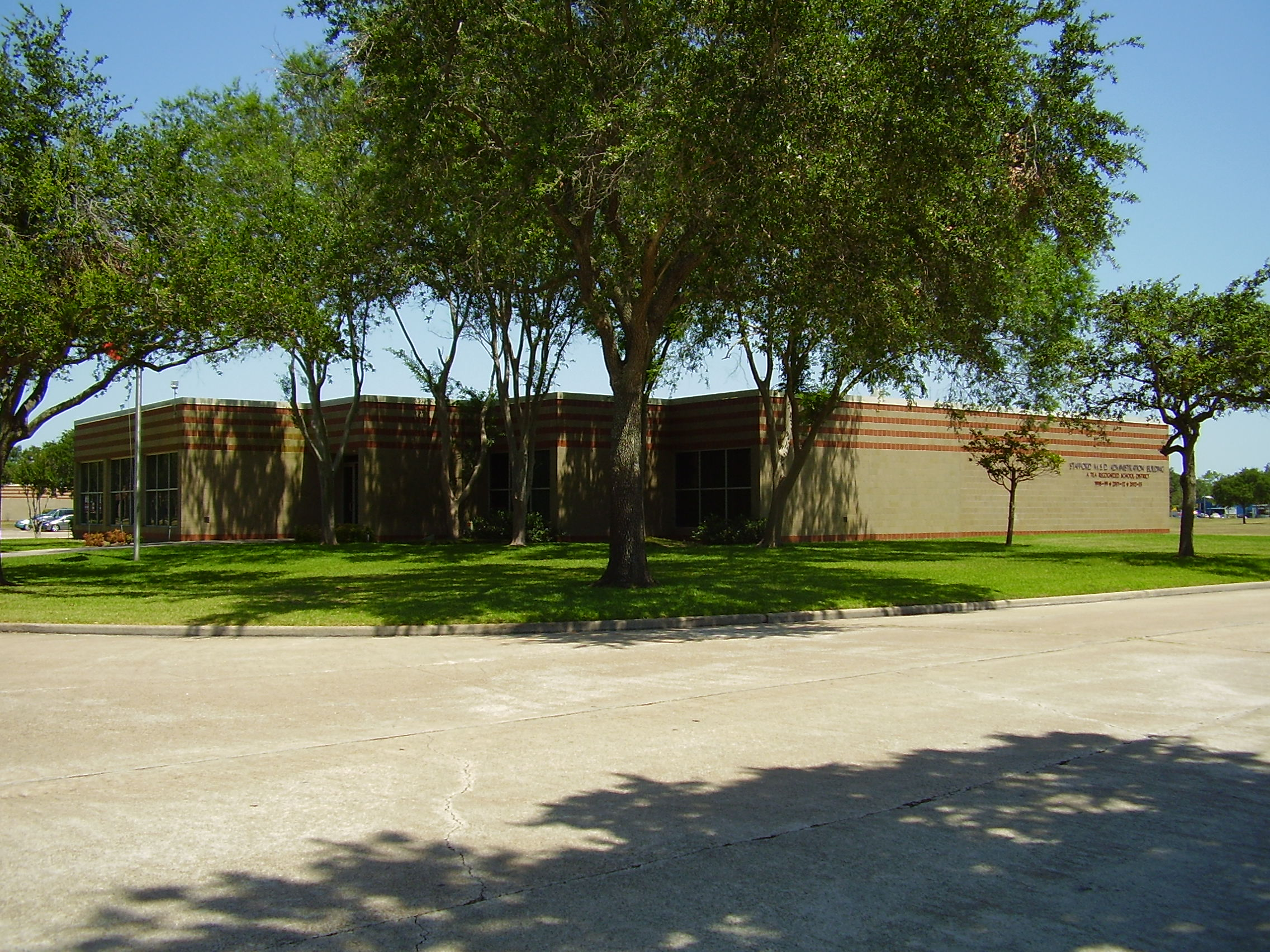
Stafford Municipal School District headquarters

==== Public schools ====
The city has the only municipal school district (Stafford Municipal School District) in all of Texas. In 1977, Stafford broke away from the Fort Bend Independent School District (FBISD), which caused several rounds of federal litigation; by 1981, it was declared that the Stafford Municipal School District was constitutional. Almost all of Stafford was in FBISD, with a minuscule portion in the Houston Independent School District. All of Stafford is now zoned to the Stafford Municipal School District, Texas's only municipal school district controlled by the city. Residents pay property taxes to the school district.

When most of Stafford was a part of FBISD, Staffordshire Elementary was in Stafford. Staffordshire housed Black students in grades 1–4. Black secondary school students attended the M.R. Wood School in Sugar Land. At the time FBISD formed in 1959, white students could attend one of two elementary schools, and they attended a middle school in Sugar Land and a high school site in Missouri City; the latter two sites now house Lakeview Elementary School and Missouri City Middle School. Dulles High School became the high school for white students in FBISD. In September 1965 Fort Bend ISD desegregated and Staffordshire School closed. Staffordshire students were reassigned to E. A. Jones Elementary School in Missouri City. Dulles Junior High School served as FBISD's sole junior high school from March 1965 to August 1975. Dulles High became the only zoned high school for students of all races in FBISD until Willowridge High School in Houston opened in 1979.

==== Private schools ====
Everest Academy (Pre-K–5), a school of the Darul Arqam Schools, is in Stafford. Sugar Creek Montessori School also has a campus in Stafford.

=== Public libraries ===
Fort Bend County Libraries' Mamie George Branch is in Sugar Land, on Dulles Avenue next to Dulles Middle School. The Mamie George Library, a 4,900 square feet (460 m^{2}) library designed by Wylie W. Vale and Associates, opened in November 1974. It was named after Mamie George, a philanthropist from Fort Bend County. The George Foundation donated funds for the building, and the Fort Bend Independent School District donated the land the library was built on. The library was renovated in 1991. In 1996 the small-business-center materials were moved from the Missouri City Branch to the Mamie George Branch.

== Gallery ==
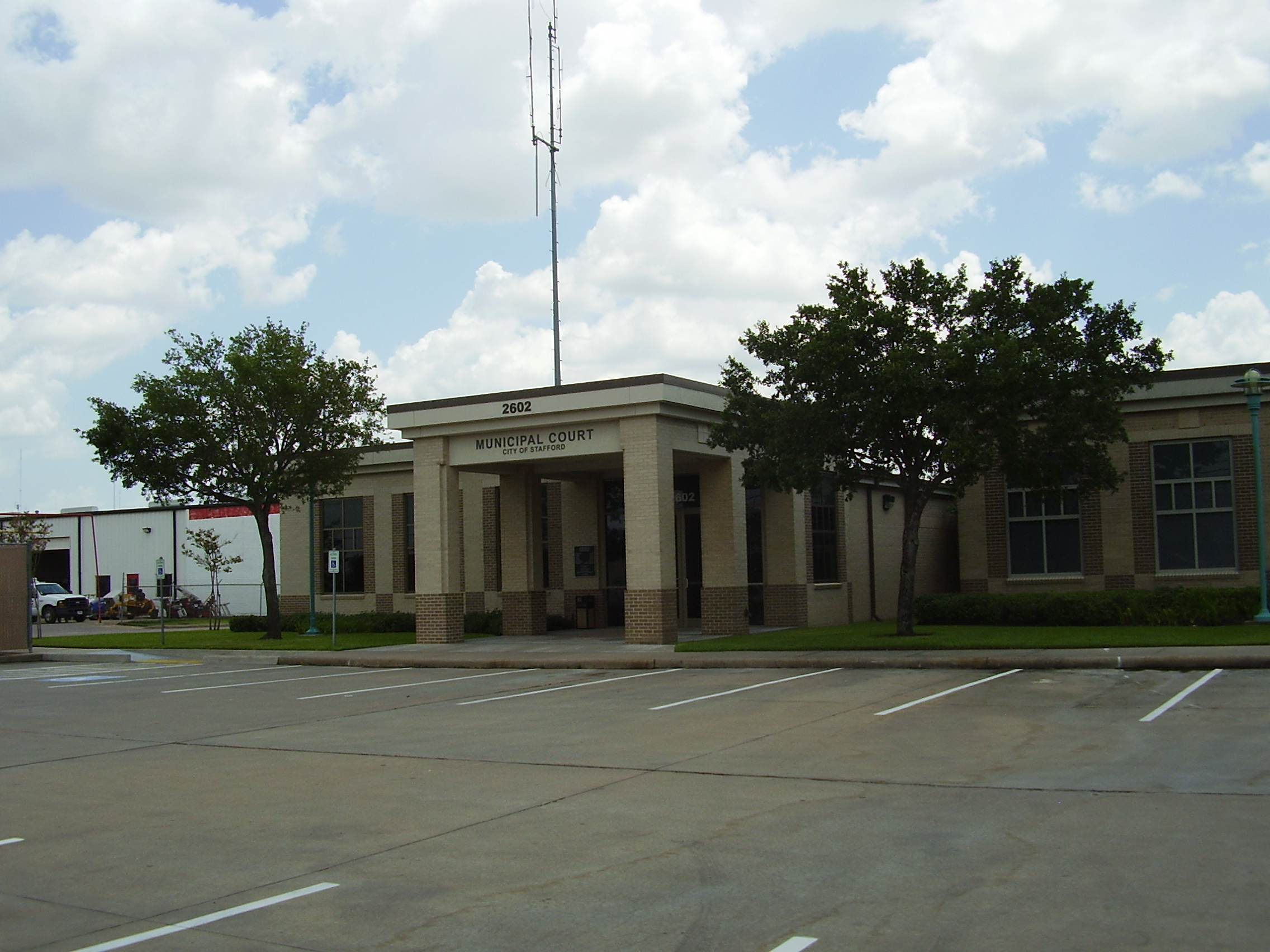
Stafford Municipal Court

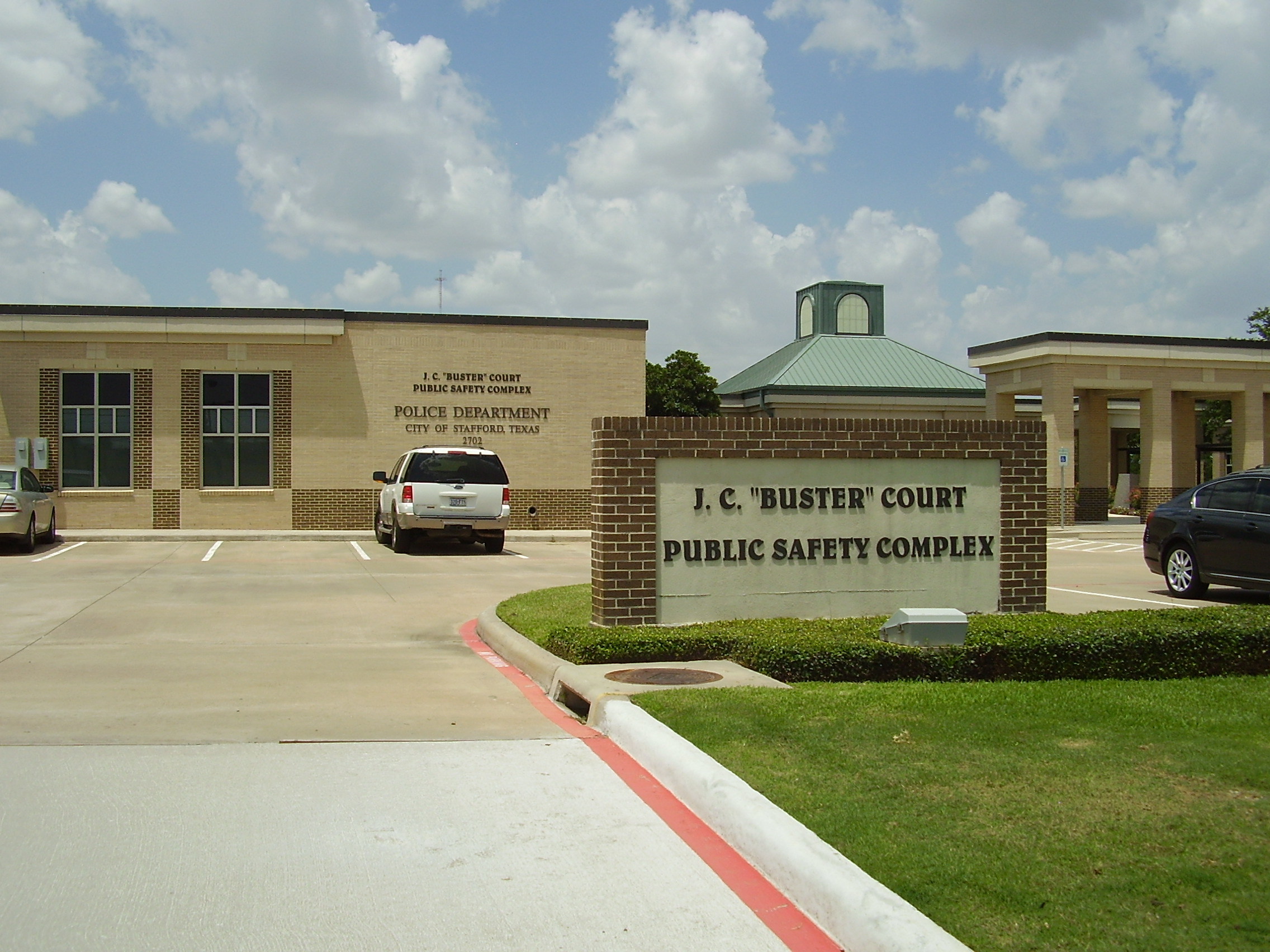
Stafford Police Department, part of the J.C. "Buster" Public Safety Complex

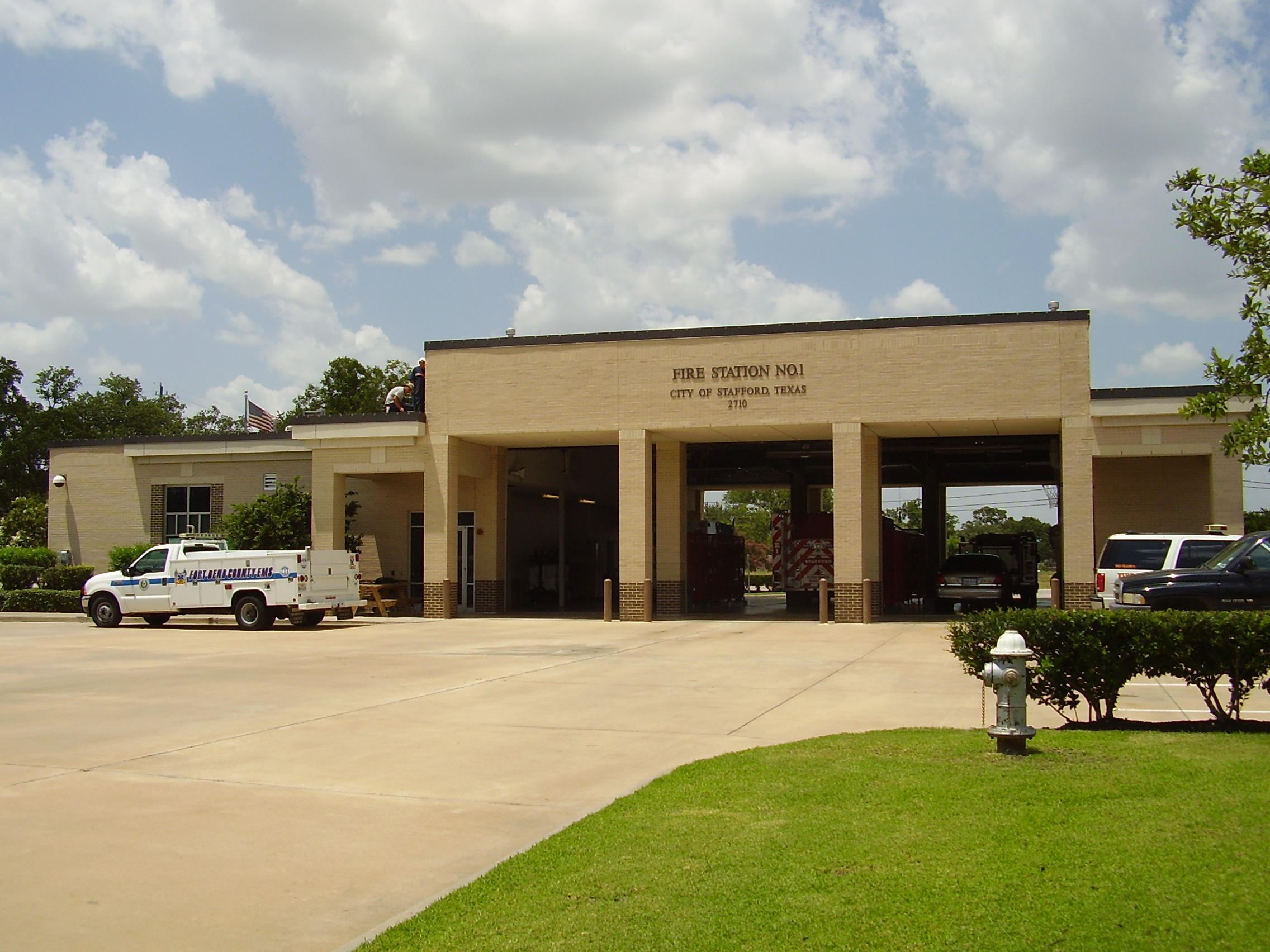
Fire Station No. 1, part of the J.C. "Buster" Court Public Safety Complex

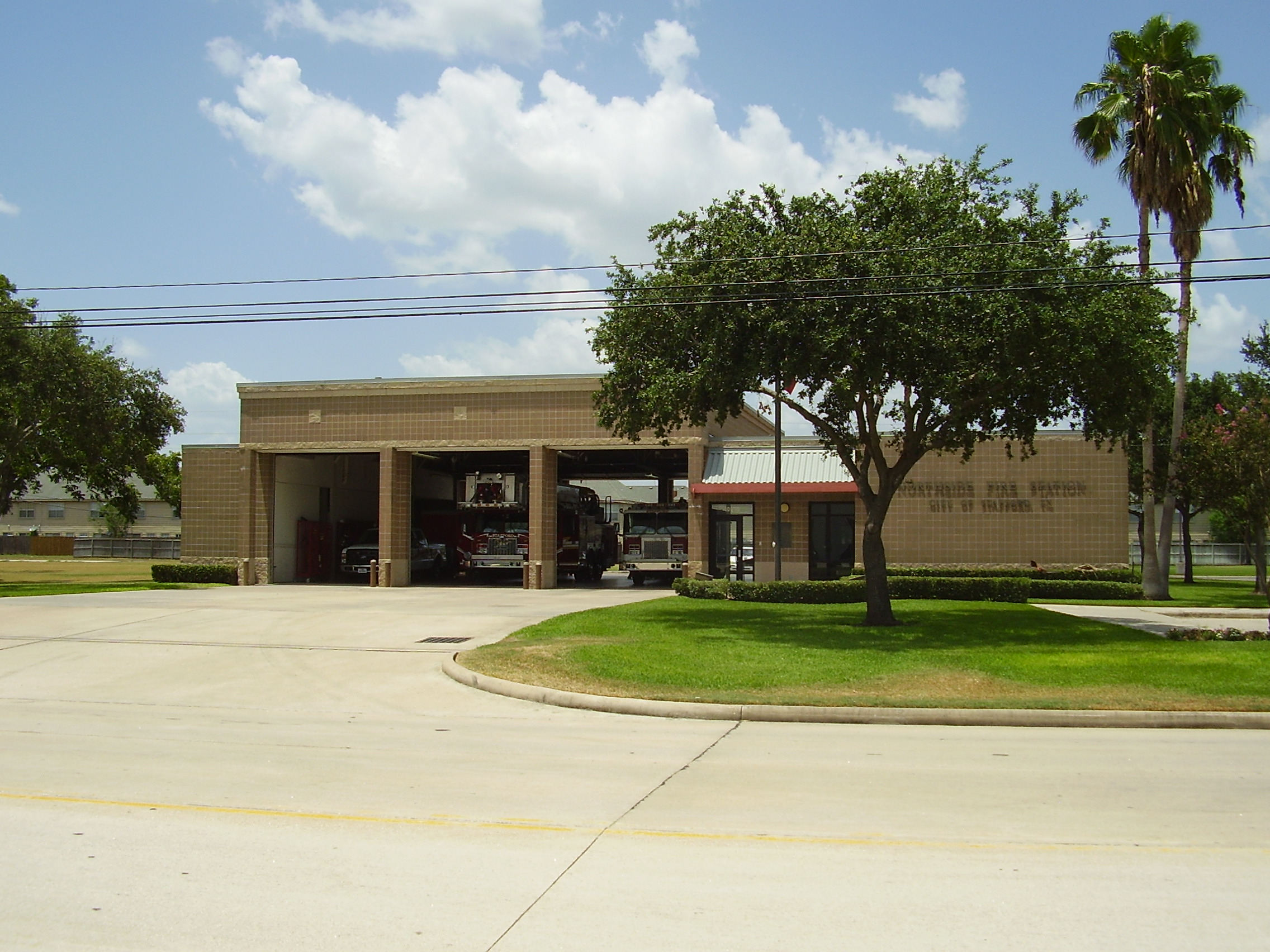
Northside Fire Station

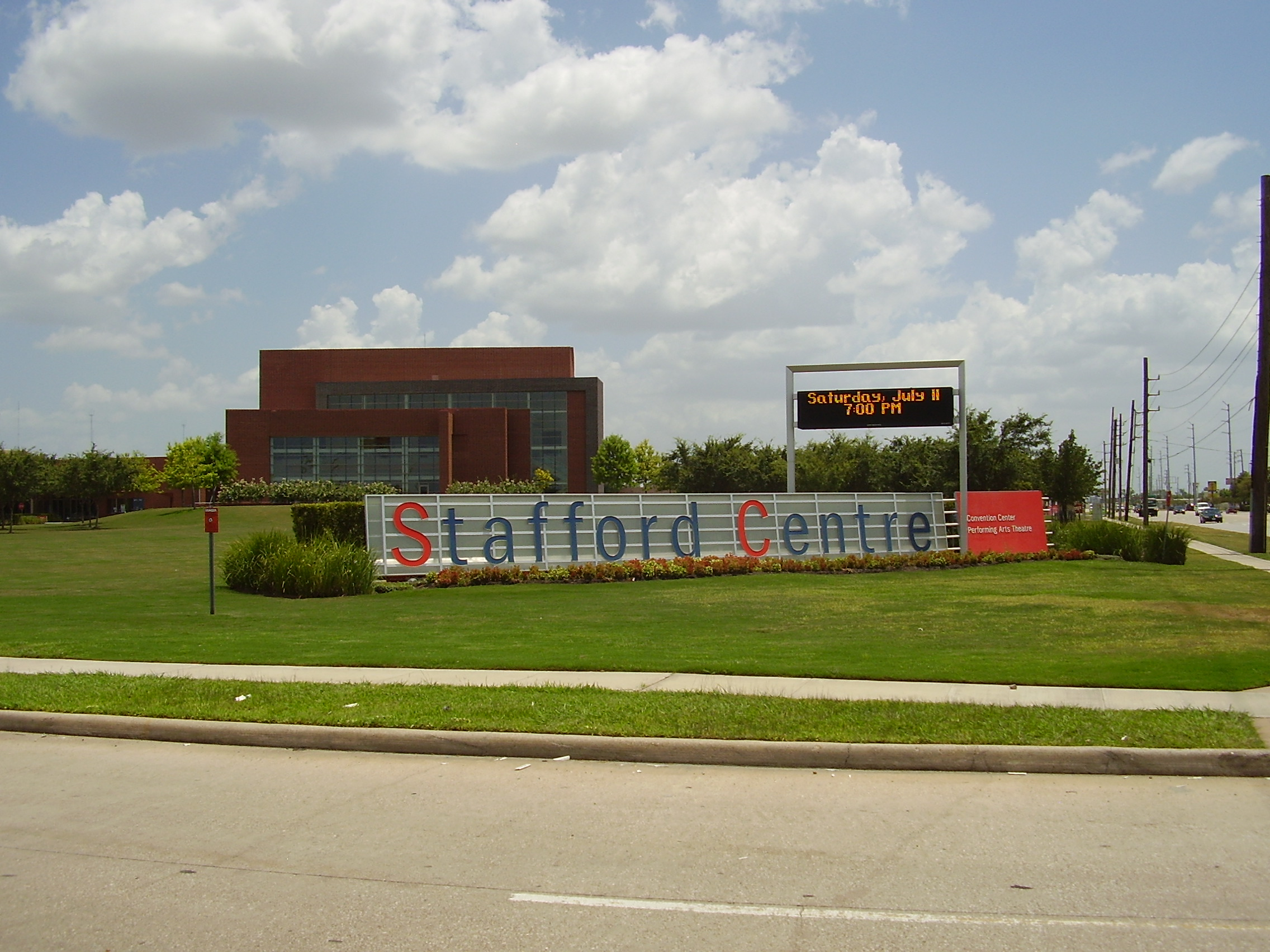
Stafford Centre for the Performing Arts

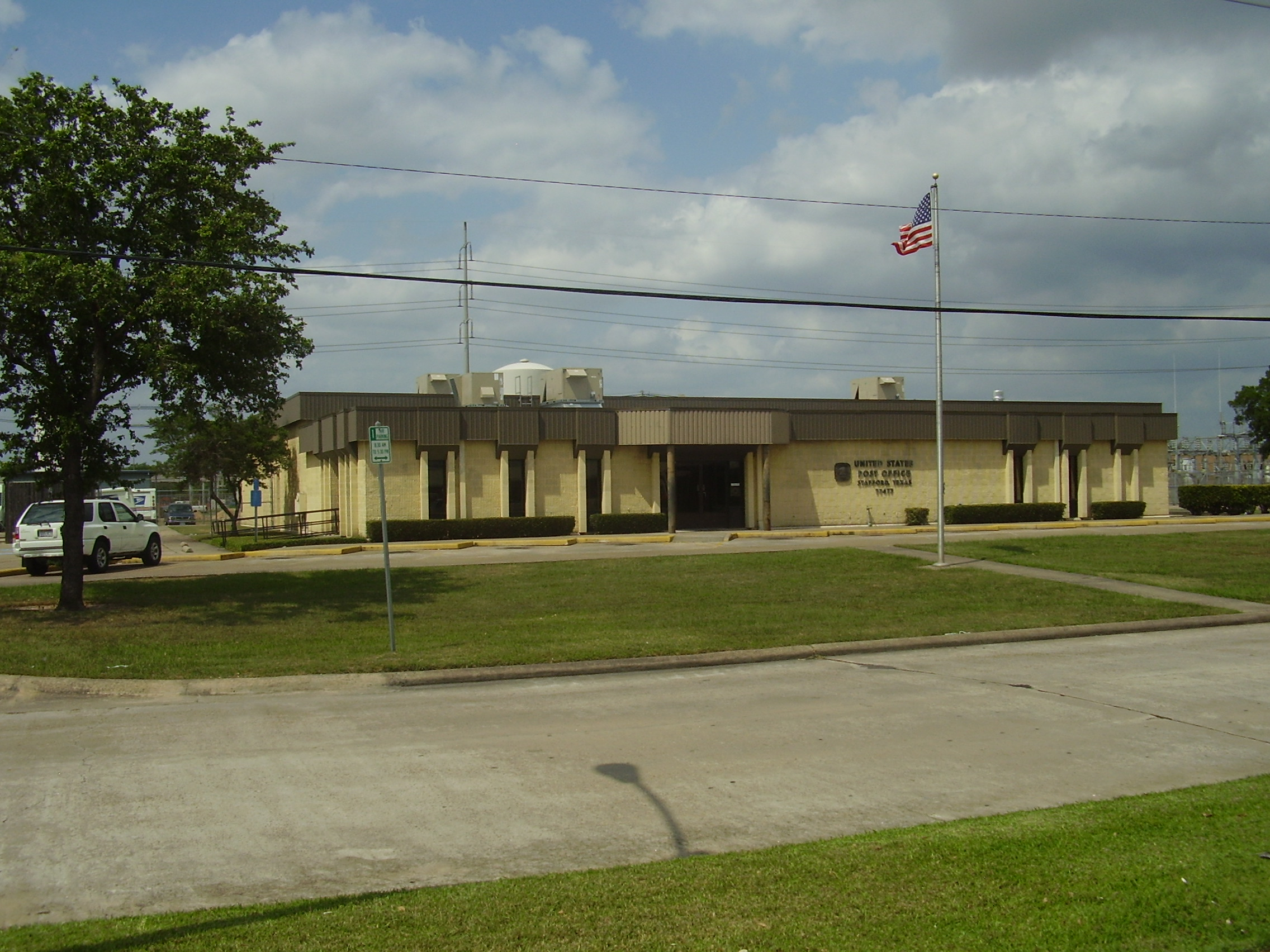
Stafford Post Office
