= List of Air Force Falcons bowl games =

The Air Force Falcons football team competes in the National Collegiate Athletic Association (NCAA) Division I Football Bowl Subdivision, representing the United States Air Force Academy. Since 1999, the Falcons have competed as a charter member of the Mountain West Conference.

Overall, Air Force has participated in 30 bowl games, and has a 16–13–1 all-time postseason record. The first Air Force bowl game was the 1959 Cotton Bowl, a 0–0 tie with TCU. This was one of two major bowls Air Force has played in, the other being a 34–13 loss to Tennessee in the 1971 Sugar Bowl. The team regularly participated in bowl games in the late 1980s and throughout the 1990s, as coach Fisher DeBerry led the team to 12 bowl games between 1984 and 2002. Current coach Troy Calhoun has led the team to thirteen bowl games since 2007, with a 31-21 win over James Madison in the 2023 Armed Forces Bowl being the latest bowl game for Air Force. The bowl games most frequented by Air Force has been the Armed Forces Bowl, with seven total appearances (including three straight from 2007–2009), followed by the Liberty Bowl (four straight from 1989–1992).

== Key ==
Results
W	Win
L	Loss
T	Tie

== Bowl games ==
List of bowl games showing bowl played in, score, date, season, opponent, stadium, location, attendance and head coach (Note: Statistics correct as of 2019–20 NCAA football bowl games.)
#	Bowl	Score (Note: Results are sortable first by whether the result was an Air Force win, loss or tie and then second by the margin of victory.)	Date	Season (Note: Links to the season article for the Air Force team that competed in the bowl for that year.)	Opponent (Note: Links to the season article for the opponent that Air Force competed against in the bowl for that year when available or to their general page when unavailable.)	Stadium	Location	Attendance	Head coach
1	Cotton Bowl	T 0–0	January 1, 1959	1958	TCU Horned Frogs	Cotton Bowl	Dallas	75,504	Ben Martin
2	Gator Bowl	L 0–35	December 28, 1963	1963	North Carolina Tar Heels	Gator Bowl Stadium	Jacksonville	50,018	Ben Martin
3	Sugar Bowl	L 13–34	January 1, 1971	1970	Tennessee Volunteers	Tulane Stadium	New Orleans	75,087	Ben Martin
4	Hall of Fame Classic	W 36–28	December 31, 1982	1982	Vanderbilt Commodores	Legion Field	Birmingham	75,000	Ken Hatfield
5	Independence Bowl	W 9–3	December 10, 1983	1983	Ole Miss Rebels	Independence Stadium	Shreveport	41,274	Ken Hatfield
6	Independence Bowl	W 23–7	December 15, 1984	1984	Virginia Tech	Independence Stadium	Shreveport	41,100	Fisher DeBerry
7	Bluebonnet Bowl	W 24–16	December 31, 1985	1985	Texas Longhorns	Rice Stadium	Houston	42,000	Fisher DeBerry
8	Freedom Bowl	L 28–33	December 30, 1987	1987	Arizona State Sun Devils	Anaheim Stadium	Anaheim	33,261	Fisher DeBerry
9	Liberty Bowl	L 29–42	December 28, 1989	1989	Ole Miss Rebels	Liberty Bowl Memorial Stadium	Memphis	33,261	Fisher DeBerry
10	Liberty Bowl	W 23–11	December 27, 1990	1990	Ohio State Buckeyes	Liberty Bowl Memorial Stadium	Memphis	13,144	Fisher DeBerry
11	Liberty Bowl	W 31–15	December 29, 1991	1991	Mississippi State Bulldogs	Liberty Bowl Memorial Stadium	Memphis	61,497	Fisher DeBerry
12	Liberty Bowl	L 0–13	December 31, 1992	1992	Ole Miss Rebels	Liberty Bowl Memorial Stadium	Memphis	32,107	Fisher DeBerry
13	Copper Bowl	L 41–55	December 27, 1995	1995	Texas Tech Red Raiders	Arizona Stadium	Tucson	41,004	Fisher DeBerry
14	Las Vegas Bowl	L 13–41	December 20, 1997	1997	Oregon Ducks	Sam Boyd Stadium	Whitney	21,514	Fisher DeBerry
15	Oahu Bowl	W 43–25	December 25, 1998	1998	Washington Huskies	Aloha Stadium	Honolulu	34,083	Fisher DeBerry
16	Silicon Valley Football Classic	W 37–34	December 31, 2000	2000	Fresno State Bulldogs	Spartan Stadium	San Jose	26,542	Fisher DeBerry
17	San Francisco Bowl	L 13–20	December 31, 2002	2002	Virginia Tech Hokies	Pacific Bell Park	San Francisco	25,966	Fisher DeBerry
18	Armed Forces Bowl	L 36–42	December 31, 2007	2007	California Golden Bears	Amon G. Carter Stadium	Fort Worth	40,905	Troy Calhoun
19	Armed Forces Bowl	L 28–34	December 31, 2008	2008	Houston Cougars	Amon G. Carter Stadium	Fort Worth	41,127	Troy Calhoun
20	Armed Forces Bowl	W 47–20	December 31, 2009	2009	Houston Cougars	Amon G. Carter Stadium	Fort Worth	41,414	Troy Calhoun
21	Independence Bowl	W 14–7	December 27, 2010	2010	Georgia Tech Yellow Jackets	Independence Stadium	Shreveport	39,362	Troy Calhoun
22	Military Bowl	L 41–42	December 28, 2011	2011	Toledo Rockets	RFK Stadium	Washington, D.C.	25,042	Troy Calhoun
23	Armed Forces Bowl	L 14–33	December 29, 2012	2012	Rice Owls	Amon G. Carter Stadium	Fort Worth	40,754	Troy Calhoun
24	Famous Idaho Potato Bowl	W 38–24	December 20, 2014	2014	Western Michigan Broncos	Albertsons Stadium	Boise	18,223	Troy Calhoun
25	Armed Forces Bowl	L 36–55	December 29, 2015	2015	California Golden Bears	Amon G. Carter Stadium	Fort Worth	38,915	Troy Calhoun
26	Arizona Bowl	W 45–21	December 30, 2016	2016	South Alabama Jaguars	Arizona Stadium	Tucson	33,868	Troy Calhoun
27	Cheez-It Bowl	W 31–21	December 27, 2019	2019	Washington State Cougars	Chase Field	Phoenix	34,105	Troy Calhoun
28	First Responder Bowl	W 31–28	December 28, 2021	2021	Louisville Cardinals	Gerald J. Ford Stadium	Dallas	15,251	Troy Calhoun
29	Armed Forces Bowl	W 30–15	December 31, 2022	2022	Baylor Bears	Amon G. Carter Stadium	Fort Worth	43,875	Troy Calhoun
30	Armed Forces Bowl	W 31–21	December 23, 2023	2023	James Madison Dukes	Amon G. Carter Stadium	Fort Worth	30,828	Troy Calhoun
