= 2022 Armed Forces Bowl =

Postseason college football bowl game

2022 Lockheed Martin Armed Forces Bowl
- 20th Armed Forces Bowl
| Baylor Bears | Air Force Falcons |
| (6–6) | (9–3) |
| Big 12 | MWC |
| 15 | 30 |
| Head coach: Dave Aranda | Head coach: Troy Calhoun |
| | 1 | 2 | 3 | 4 | Total |
|---|---|---|---|---|---|
| Baylor | 0 | 7 | 0 | 8 | 15 |
| Air Force | 9 | 0 | 14 | 7 | 30 |
- Date: December 22, 2022
- Season: 2022
- Stadium: Amon G. Carter Stadium
- Location: Fort Worth, Texas
- MVP: Haaziq Daniels (QB, Air Force) & Dillon Doyle (LB, Baylor)
- Favorite: Baylor by 3.5
- Referee: Jeremy Valentine (MAC)
- Attendance: 43,875
- Payout: US$1,350,000

United States TV coverage
- Network: ESPN
- Announcers: Brian Custer (play-by-play), Dustin Fox (analyst), and Lauren Sisler (sideline)

International TV coverage
- Network: ESPN Deportes

The 2022 Armed Forces Bowl was a college football bowl game played on December 22, 2022, at Amon G. Carter Stadium in Fort Worth, Texas. The 20th annual Armed Forces Bowl, the game featured the Baylor Bears from the Big 12 Conference and the Air Force Falcons from the Mountain West Conference. The game began at 6:34 p.m. CST and was aired on ESPN. It was one of the 2022–23 bowl games concluding the 2022 FBS football season. The game was officially named the Lockheed Martin Armed Forces Bowl after its corporate sponsor Lockheed Martin.

The game began in frigid 13 °F (−11 °C) conditions. Baylor punted on each of their first two possessions. Air Force scored a touchdown on their first possession (though the extra point was blocked) and a field goal on their second to take an early 9–0 lead. After a missed 38-yard field goal midway through the second quarter, the Bears pulled within two points going into halftime with a touchdown of their own on a pass from Blake Shapen to Hal Presley. Air Force scored to extend their lead again at the beginning of the second half and went on to score touchdowns on two of their next three possessions, bringing the score to 30–8. Baylor, meanwhile, started the half with a punt and three consecutive turnovers on downs. However, the Bears did score again with under four minutes remaining in the game on another Shapen pass. Air Force turned the ball over on downs on each of their final two drives; Baylor's touchdown would end up being their last full drive. Air Force won the game 30–15.

== Teams ==
Based on conference tie-ins, the game would normally feature teams from the American Athletic Conference and Conference USA, however the teams in this year's game are the Baylor Bears, from the Big 12 Conference, and the Air Force Falcons, from the Mountain West Conference. This was the fourth meeting between Baylor and Air Force; the Bears had won all three previous meetings. The teams first met in 1961, and afterwards in 1962 and 1977, with the first and last games set in Waco and the second set in Colorado Springs.

=== Baylor ===
The Bears entered the game with a record of 6–6, having gone 4–5 in Big 12 conference matchups. Their appearance marked the eleventh bowl game appearance for the Bears in the last 13 seasons, with their last bowl game coming in the 2022 Sugar Bowl. This was Baylor's 27th bowl game appearance in school history, and they entered with a record of 14–12 in those games. This was their first Armed Forces Bowl appearance.

The Bears' defense came into the game as a potential weak spot, as Baylor defensive coordinator Ron Roberts was fired following the regular season; as a result, head coach Dave Aranda called the plays for Baylor on defense. Due to NFL draft opt-outs, the Bears was also without defensive lineman Siaki Ika and defensive back Mark Milton for the game. Baylor's rushing offense was viewed as a strong point, with three running backs averaging over five yards per carry and one of those backs, Richard Reese, being named Big 12 Freshman of the Year.

=== Air Force ===
Air Force entered the game with a 9–3 overall record and a 5–3 record in Mountain West games. It was their 12th bowl game under head coach Troy Calhoun and their 29th bowl game in school history. The Falcons sported a 14–13–1 record in prior bowl games, and entered with a 1–4 record in their five Armed Forces Bowl appearances with losses in 2007, 2008, 2012, and 2015, and a win in 2009.

The Falcons rushing offense, at the center of its triple option offense, was viewed by analysts as its strong point, with quarterback Haaziq Daniels and running back John Lee Eldridge III having shown their effectiveness on the ground during the season. The Falcons' defense averaged 8.5 points per game allowed over their last six regular season contests, and entered the game ranked in the top 25 nationally in sack rate.

== Game summary ==
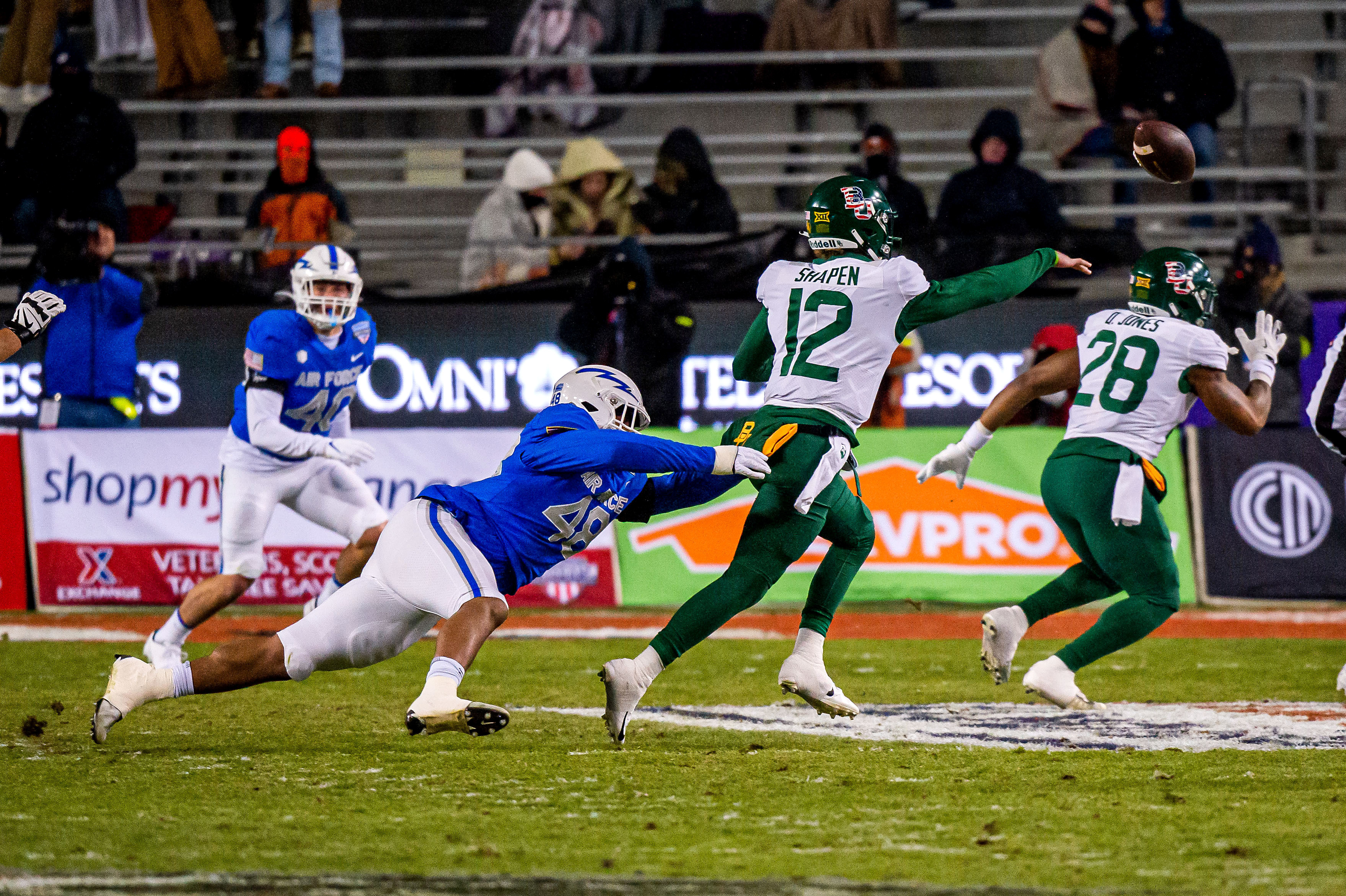
Baylor's Blake Shapen (12, white) throws a pass while being rushed by Air Force's Jayden Thiergood (48, blue) during the game

The Armed Forces Bowl was televised by ESPN, with a commentary team of Brian Custer, Dustin Fox, and Lauren Sisler. The game's officiating crew, representing the Mid-American Conference, was led by referee Jeremy Valentine and umpire Willian Steinke. The game was played at Amon G. Carter Stadium in Fort Worth, Texas. The weather at kickoff was clear with a temperature of 13 °F (−11 °C) and 20 mph (32 km/h) winds that produced a wind chill of −4 °F (−20 °C). The low temperature nearly broke the record to make it the coldest bowl game, but ended up missing that mark by 1 °F, though it did set a new record for the coldest kickoff temperature in Baylor program history.

=== First half ===
The game began at 6:34 p.m. CST with the opening kickoff by Air Force's Matthew Dapore returned to the Baylor 21-yard-line by Monaray Baldwin. Baylor began slowly on offense, with a three-and-out and a punt on 4th & 9 after gaining only 1 yard on their first drive. Air Force did not suffer the same result: a 12-yard pass from Haaziq Daniels to David Cormier earned them a first down and they converted 4th & 5 several plays later with another Daniels-to-Cormier pass for 8 yards. Two rushes by Brad Roberts and a carry by Daniels earned them another first down, and they advanced inside the 10-yard-line on the next play. On the drive's fifteenth play, Roberts rushed for a 2-yard touchdown to open the scoring, though Dapore's extra point attempt was blocked, keeping the score 6–0 Air Force. Baldwin returned the ensuing kickoff to the Baylor 27-yard-line. A false start set Baylor back five yards before their first play, though Craig Williams rushed for 10 yards to earn the lost yardage back. A pair of rushes totaling 3 yards set up 4th & 2 for Baylor, and they had to punt again, this time for 23 yards. Air Force started back at their own 42-yard-line, and a 34-yard rush by John Lee Eldridge III put the Falcons near the red zone quickly. Roberts rushed twice, each for 2 yards, before Daniels threw an incomplete pass, prompting a field goal attempt by Dapore which was successful from 37 yards. A kickoff return by Baylor to their 22-yard-line and a Bears first down on a 13-yard pass from Blake Shapen to Gavin Holmes set up a 1-yard rush on 1st & 10 for Qualan Jones, which ended the first quarter.

A 6-yard pass from Shapen to Kelsey Johnson left two yards to go on fourth down for Baylor early in the second quarter, and they converted with a 4-yard Williams rush. Their next three plays gained only 1 yard and Isaac Power was brought on to punt for the third time; this was his best punt, going 50 yards and being downed at the Air Force 7-yard-line. The Falcons gained 11 yards right away with a rush by Daniels but stalled from there, as Eldridge picked up 2 yards on their next play but a rush for no gain and an incomplete pass brought up 4th & 8. Carson Bay punted for the Falcons for the first time, and Baylor took over possession at the 50-yard-line. A 31-yard pass from Shapen to Josh Cameron on their first play took them inside the red zone immediately, though a lack of yardage on first and second down brought up third-and-long, and the pass to Holmes went for no gain. Baylor unsuccessfully attempted a 38-yard field goal on 4th & 11 with the kick drifting wide left, giving Air Force the ball back at their own 20-yard-line. Two DeAndre Hughes rushes for 7 and 4 yards moved the chains for Air Force in their first three plays with the ball. Daniels carried for 9 yards on their next two plays, setting up Roberts to gain 3 yards and another first down. The Falcons faced 4th & 1 four plays later, and Daniels's rush was stopped for a loss of five yards, forcing a turnover on downs and giving Baylor the ball at the Air Force 47-yard-line. A holding penalty set Baylor back from the start and they faced 4th & 2 early on in their drive. On the play, Jones rushed for 5 yards to move the chains with 18 seconds remaining, and Shapen followed that up with an 11-yard pass to Cameron. A pass intended for Hal Presley was incomplete but drew a pass interference penalty, putting the ball on the 8-yard-line, and Shapen passed to Presley on the next play for Baylor's first score. With six seconds left, Air Force opted to kneel and end the half leading by two points.

=== Second half ===
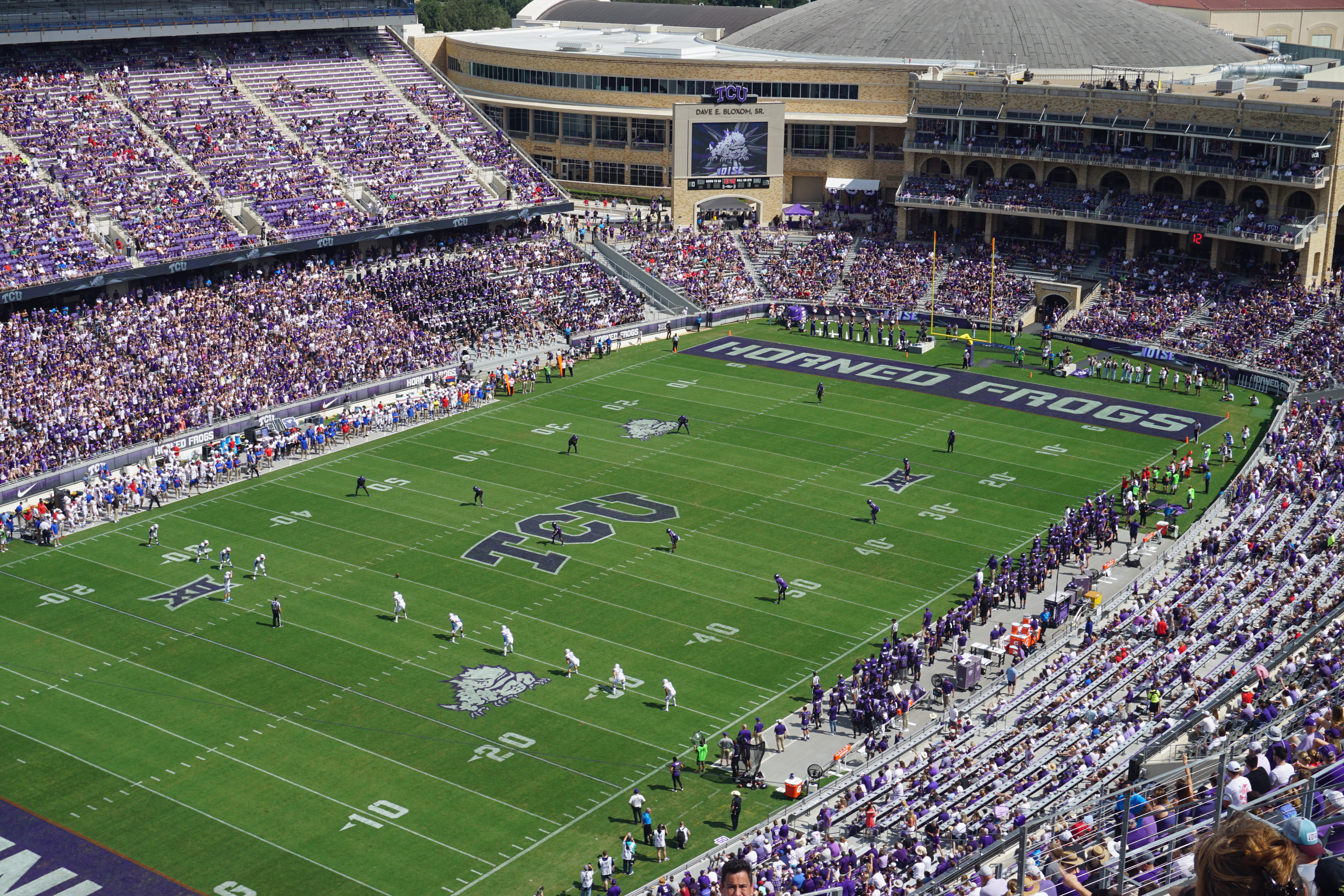
Amon G. Carter Stadium, the host of the game, during a TCU football game in 2019

Air Force started the second half with the ball as they returned the kickoff to their own 17-yard-line. A gain of 15 yards on third-and-long by Daniels preempted a 68-yard pass from Daniels to Amari Terry, putting Air Force on the Baylor 2-yard-line and setting them up for a 2-yard rushing touchdown on their next play to increase their lead to nine points along with Dapore's extra point. Baylor started slower on offense, with a pair of Richard Reese carries gaining four yards apiece and an incomplete pass bringing up 4th & 2. A rush by Williams to the Baylor 35-yard-line reached the line to gain and gave Baylor a first down, but the Bears offense stalled from there and Baylor had to punt, which gave Air Force possession at their own 27-yard-line. The Falcons quickly went three-and-out, with a rush by Hughes and two rushes by Eldridge gaining six yards in total and resulting in a punt, though the kick only went 11 yards and bounced out-of-bounds at the Air Force 44-yard-line. Baylor was unable to capitalize on the good field position as they too went three-and-out, though they lost possession with a failed fourth down conversion rather than a punt; Shapen rushed for 2 yards on 4th & 4, giving the ball back to Air Force. The Falcons rushed for 12 yards on the second play of their next drive, and a trio of rushes by Eldridge for 20, 3, and 9 yards moved them inside the red zone. On the next play, Daniels passed to Caleb Rillos for a 15-yard touchdown, giving Air Force a sixteen-point lead. Baylor went three-and-out again on their next drive, with Jones gaining their only yardage on a 3-yard carry on third down. A sack by Vince Sanford for a loss of 7 yards on fourth down gave the ball back to Air Force at the Baylor 42-yard-line with 44 seconds left, and Roberts rushed for gains of 7 and 5 yards to put an end to the quarter.

Air Force started the fourth quarter with the ball on the Baylor 30-yard-line and ran the ball three consecutive times with Roberts, gaining 21 yards in total. An offside penalty on Baylor moved the ball to the 4-yard-line and the second of two more rushes by Roberts reached the end zone for a touchdown. After his extra point, Dapore kicked off and Ben Sims returned the kick to the Baylor 21-yard-line. A 20-yard pass from Shapen to Holmes started the drive for the Bears, but an incomplete pass and two 3-yard rushes on the following three plays set up another fourth down situation for Baylor. Shapen's pass was intended for Jones but fell incomplete and Air Force took the ball again at the Baylor 47-yard-line. Their next drive traversed 32 yards in 10 plays, all of which were rushes by Roberts; they picked up two first downs, on 3rd & 3 from the Baylor 40-yard-line and on 3rd & 2 from the 27-yard-line, but turned the ball over on downs after failing to gain a yard on fourth down. Baylor got the ball back on their own 15-yard-line and took a downfield shot right away, as Shapen connected with Jaylen Ellis for a 57-yard gain and followed it up with a 14-yard pass to Johnson. Two plays later, the Bears scored on a 14-yard Shapen-to-Holmes pass, and converted the two-point try to cut the deficit to 15 points. Noah Rauschenberg's onside kick was recovered by Air Force, who exhausted all three of Baylor's timeouts with three rushes by Brad Roberts before converting 4th & 1 with a Daniels rush for 2 yards. Three more rushes by Roberts set up another fourth-and-short with 28 seconds remaining, though Roberts was stopped short of the marker and Air Force turned the ball over on downs. Baylor took over at their own 29-yard-line and suffered a sack on their final play, after which the clock ran out and Air Force secured an Armed Forces Bowl victory, 30–15. The game ended at 8:01 p.m. after a duration of three hours and 26 minutes.

=== Scoring summary ===
2022 Lockheed Martin Armed Forces Bowl

| Quarter | 1 | 2 | 3 | 4 | Total |
|---|---|---|---|---|---|
| Baylor | 0 | 7 | 0 | 8 | 15 |
| Air Force | 9 | 0 | 14 | 7 | 30 |

at Amon G. Carter Stadium • Fort Worth, Texas

- Date: December 22, 2022
- Game time: 6:30 p.m. CST
- Game weather: Clear • Temperature: 13 °F (−11 °C) • Wind: North 20 mph (32 km/h)
- Game attendance: 43,875
- Referee: Jeremy Valentine
- TV announcers (ESPN): Brian Custer (play-by-play), Dustin Fox (analyst), and Lauren Sisler (sideline)
- Box score

Scoring summary

| Quarter | Time | Drive | | | Team | Scoring information | Score | |
| Quarter | Time | Plays | Yards | TOP | Team | Scoring information | Baylor | Air Force |
|---|---|---|---|---|---|---|---|---|
| 1 | 5:20 | 15 | 55 | 8:44 | Air Force | Brad Roberts 2-yard touchdown run, Matthew Dapore kick failed (blocked) | 0 | 6 |
| 1 | 1:13 | 5 | 38 | 2:05 | Air Force | 37-yard field goal by Matthew Dapore | 0 | 9 |
| 2 | 0:05 | 6 | 47 | 1:35 | Baylor | Hal Presley 8-yard touchdown reception from Blake Shapen, John Mayers kick good | 7 | 9 |
| 3 | 12:28 | 5 | 83 | 2:32 | Air Force | Haaziq Daniels 2-yard touchdown run, Matthew Dapore kick good | 7 | 16 |
| 3 | 2:29 | 7 | 64 | 3:21 | Air Force | Caleb Rillos 15-yard touchdown reception from Haaziq Daniels, Matthew Dapore kick good | 7 | 23 |
| 4 | 12:40 | 7 | 42 | 3:15 | Air Force | Brad Roberts 1-yard touchdown run, Matthew Dapore kick good | 7 | 30 |
| 4 | 3:34 | 4 | 85 | 0:51 | Baylor | Gavin Holmes 14-yard touchdown reception from Blake Shapen, 2-point rush good | 15 | 30 |
| "TOP" = time of possession. For other American football terms, see Glossary of American football. | | | | | | | 15 | 30 |

== Statistics ==
Team statistical comparison
| Statistic | Baylor | Air Force |
|---|---|---|
| First downs | 11 | 20 |
| First downs rushing | 3 | 16 |
| First downs passing | 7 | 4 |
| First downs penalty | 1 | 0 |
| Third down efficiency | 0–11 | 8–16 |
| Fourth down efficiency | 3–6 | 2–5 |
| Total plays–net yards | 49–230 | 74–379 |
| Rushing attempts–net yards | 26–42 | 67–276 |
| Yards per rush | 1.6 | 4.1 |
| Yards passing | 188 | 103 |
| Pass completions–attempts | 11–23 | 4–7 |
| Interceptions thrown | 0 | 0 |
| Punt returns–total yards | 0–0 | 0–0 |
| Kickoff returns–total yards | 6–99 | 1–0 |
| Punts–average yardage | 4–36.3 | 2–20.5 |
| Fumbles–lost | 0–0 | 0–0 |
| Penalties–yards | 5–25 | 2–19 |
| Time of possession | 19:57 | 40:03 |

Baylor statistics
Bears passing
| | C–A | Yds | TD–INT |
|---|---|---|---|
| Blake Shapen | 11–23 | 188 | 2–0 |
Bears rushing
| | Car | Yds | TD |
| Craig Williams | 7 | 25 | 0 |
| Qualan Jones | 5 | 14 | 0 |
| Richard Reese | 8 | 10 | 0 |
| Josh Cameron | 1 | 1 | 0 |
| Blake Shapen | 5 | −8 | 0 |
Bears receiving
| | Rec | Yds | TD |
| Jaylen Ellis | 1 | 57 | 0 |
| Josh Cameron | 3 | 56 | 0 |
| Gavin Holmes | 4 | 47 | 1 |
| Kelsey Johnson | 2 | 20 | 0 |
| Hal Presley | 1 | 8 | 1 |

Air Force statistics
Falcons passing
| | C–A | Yds | TD–INT |
|---|---|---|---|
| Haaziq Daniels | 4–7 | 103 | 1–0 |
Falcons rushing
| | Car | Yds | TD |
| Brad Roberts | 37 | 116 | 2 |
| Haaziq Daniels | 15 | 81 | 1 |
| John Lee Eldridge III | 10 | 65 | 0 |
| DeAndre Hughes | 4 | 15 | 0 |
| TEAM | 1 | −1 | 0 |
Falcons receiving
| | Rec | Yds | TD |
| Amari Terry | 1 | 68 | 0 |
| David Cormier | 2 | 20 | 0 |
| Caleb Rillos | 1 | 15 | 1 |
