= 2022 Baylor Bears football team =

American college football season

2022 Baylor Bears football

Armed Forces Bowl, L 15–30 vs. Air Force
- Conference: Big 12 Conference
- Record: 6–7 (4–5 Big 12)
- Head coach: Dave Aranda (3rd season)
- Offensive coordinator: Jeff Grimes (2nd season)
- Offensive scheme: Multiple
- Defensive coordinator: Ron Roberts (3rd season)
- Base defense: Multiple
- Home stadium: McLane Stadium

Uniform
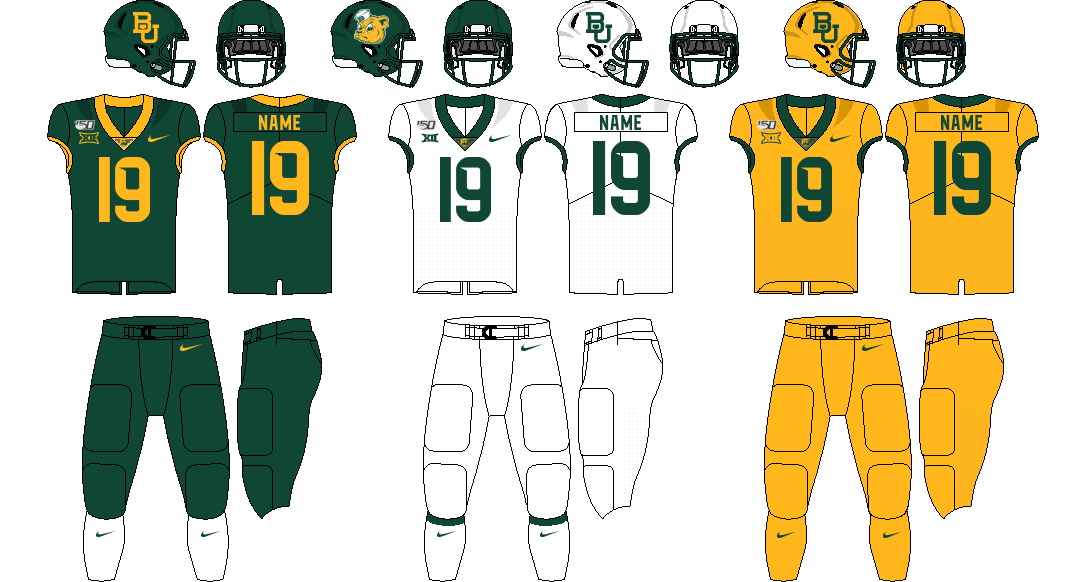

2022 Big 12 Conference football standings
	Conf.			Overall
Team	W		L	W		L
No. 2 TCU y^	9	–	0	13	–	2
No. 14 Kansas State y$	7	–	2	10	–	4
No. 25 Texas	6	–	3	8	–	5
Texas Tech	5	–	4	8	–	5
Oklahoma State	4	–	5	7	–	6
Baylor	4	–	5	6	–	7
Oklahoma	3	–	6	6	–	7
Kansas	3	–	6	6	–	7
West Virginia	3	–	6	5	–	7
Iowa State	1	–	8	4	–	8
Championship: Kansas State 31, TCU 28 ^{OT}
^ – College Football Playoff participant; $ – Conference champion; y – Championship game participant; Rankings from AP Poll

The 2022 Baylor Bears football team represented Baylor University in the 2022 NCAA Division I FBS football season. The Bears played their home games at McLane Stadium in Waco, Texas, and competed in the Big 12 Conference. They were led by third-year head coach Dave Aranda.

Initially picked by many to win the Big 12 Conference, the Bears won some key road games against Oklahoma and Texas Tech, but also suffered key home defeats to ranked opponents like Oklahoma State, Texas, and a crushing one-point defeat to eventual national runner-up, TCU. They would ultimate finish the year in a disappointing 6th place in the Big-12 and lose their subsequent bowl game, finishing the year 6-7.

== Offseason ==
=== 2022 NFL draft ===
Round	Pick	Player	Position	NFL team
2	37	Jalen Pitre	S	Houston Texans
2	50	Tyquan Thornton	WR	New England Patriots
3	79	JT Woods	S	Los Angeles Chargers
3	99	Terrel Bernard	LB	Buffalo Bills
6	203	Trestan Ebner	RB	Chicago Bears
7	242	Kalon Barnes	CB	Carolina Panthers

== Preseason ==
=== Spring game ===
The Bears held spring practices in March and April 2022. The Baylor football spring "Green and Gold game" took place in Waco, TX on April 23, 2022.

=== Big 12 media poll ===
The preseason poll was released on July 7, 2022.

Big 12 media poll
Predicted finish	Team	Votes (1st place)
1	Baylor (17)	365
2	Oklahoma (12)	354
3	Oklahoma State (9)	342
4	Texas (2)	289
5	Kansas State	261
6	Iowa State (1)	180
7	TCU	149
8	West Virginia	147
9	Texas Tech	119
10	Kansas	48

=== Preseason Big-12 awards ===
2022 Preseason All-Big 12 teams

Position	Player	Class
Offense
TE	Ben Sims	Senior
OL	Connor Galvin	RS Senior
OL	Jacob Gall	RS Senior
Defense
DL	Siaki Ika	Junior
LB	Dillon Doyle	Senior

=== Preseason All-Americans ===
Second Team All-Americans
Player	No.	Position	Class	Selector(s)	Source(s)
Jaxon Player	90	DL	Senior	Walter Camp	

== Schedule ==
Baylor and the Big 12 announced the 2022 football schedule on December 1, 2021.

Date	Time	Opponent	Rank	Site	TV	Result	Attendance
September 3	6:00 p.m.	Albany*	No. 10	McLane Stadium; Waco, TX	ESPN+	W 69–10	41,242
September 10	9:15 p.m.	at No. 21 BYU*	No. 9	LaVell Edwards Stadium; Provo, UT	ESPN	L 20–26 ^{2OT}	63,470
September 17	11:00 a.m.	Texas State*	No. 17	McLane Stadium; Waco, TX	FS1	W 42–7	45,597
September 24	11:00 a.m.	at Iowa State	No. 17	Jack Trice Stadium; Ames, IA	ESPN2	W 31–24	58,069
October 1	2:30 p.m.	No. 9 Oklahoma State	No. 16	McLane Stadium; Waco, TX	FOX	L 25–36	47,979
October 13	6:00 p.m.	at West Virginia		Milan Puskar Stadium; Morgantown, WV	FS1	L 40–43	45,293
October 22	11:00 a.m.	Kansas^{†}		McLane Stadium; Waco, TX	ESPN2	W 35–23	45,882
October 29	6:30 p.m.	at Texas Tech		Jones AT&T Stadium; Lubbock, TX (rivalry)	ESPN2	W 45–17	60,705
November 5	2:00 p.m.	at Oklahoma		Gaylord Family Oklahoma Memorial Stadium; Norman, OK	ESPN+	W 38–35	83,546
November 12	6:00 p.m.	No. 19 Kansas State		McLane Stadium; Waco, TX	FS1	L 3–31	47,686
November 19	11:00 a.m.	No. 4 TCU		McLane Stadium; Waco, TX (rivalry)	FOX	L 28–29	44,393
November 25	11:00 a.m.	at No. 23 Texas		Darrell K Royal–Texas Memorial Stadium; Austin, TX (rivalry)	ESPN	L 27–38	94,076
December 22	6:30 p.m.	vs. Air Force*		Amon G. Carter Stadium; Fort Worth, TX (Armed Forces Bowl)	ESPN	L 15–30	43,875
*Non-conference game; ^{†}Homecoming; Rankings from AP Poll (and CFP Rankings, after November 1) - Released prior to game; All times are in Central time

== Game summaries ==
=== Vs. Albany ===
Uniform Combination
Helmet	Jersey	Pants

Albany Great Danes (0–0) vs. No. 10 Baylor Bears (0–0)

Quarter	1	2	3	4	Total
Albany	7	0	3	0	10
No. 10 Baylor	21	14	14	20	69

at McLane Stadium • Waco, TX

- Date: Saturday, September 3, 2022
- Game time: 6:00 p.m. CDT
- Game weather: sunny • Temperature: 86°F
- Game attendance: 41,242
- Referee: Kevin Boitmann
- TV announcers (ESPN+): Pete Sousa (play-by-play), Chad Brown (analyst), and Shane Sparks (sideline)

Game information

First Quarter

- (10:59) BU – Monaray Baldwin 47 yard pass from Blake Shapen, Isaiah Hankins kick (Drive: 6 plays, 76 yards, 2:20; BU 7–0)
- (8:03) BU – Craig Williams 4 yard rush, Isaiah Hankins kick (Drive: 4 plays, 29 yards, 1:46; BU 14–0)
- (5:37) BU – Gavin Holmes 72 yard punt return, Isaiah Hankins kick (BU 21–0)
- (0:00) ALB – Julian Hicks 17 yard pass from Reese Poffenbarger, John Opalko kick (Drive: 4 plays, 30 yards, 2:14; BU 21–7)

Second Quarter

- (11:55) BU – Hal Presley 38 yard pass from Blake Shapen, Isaiah Hankins kick (Drive: 6 plays, 75 yards, 3:05; BU 28–7)
- (0:00) BU – Blake Shapen 1 yard rush, Isaiah Hankins kick (Drive: 11 plays, 80 yards, 2:44; BU 35–7)

Third Quarter

- (11:48) BU – Monaray Baldwin 50 yard rush, Isaiah Hankins kick (Drive: 6 plays, 80 yards, 3:12; BU 42–7)
- (6:19) ALB – John Opalko 25 yard field goal (Drive: 11 plays, 67 yards, 5:29; BU 42–10)
- (1:54) BU – Kyron Drones 9 yard rush, John Mayers kick (Drive: 9 plays, 54 yards, 4:25; BU 49–10)

Fourth Quarter

- (12:33) BU – Richard Reese 1 yard rush, John Mayers kick (Drive: 7 plays, 61 yards, 2:40; BU 56–10)
- (9:10) BU – Richard Reese 7 yard rush, John Mayers kick (Drive: 4 plays, 22 yards, 1:59; BU 63–10)
- (5:46) BU – Qualan Jones 27 yard rush, John Mayers kick missed (Drive: 4 plays, 66 yards, 1:45; BU 69–10)

Statistics	ALB	BU
First downs	10	29
Total yards	237	573
Rushes/yards	30/87	41/259
Passing yards	150	314
Passing: Comp–Att–Int	13–30–0	22–27–0
Time of possession	30:28	29:32

Team	Category	Player	Statistics
Albany	Passing	Reese Poffenbarger	13–26, 150 yards, 1 TD
Albany	Rushing	Reese Poffenbarger	12 carries, 45 yards
Albany	Receiving	Thomas Greaney	3 receptions, 57 yards
Baylor	Passing	Blake Shapen	17–20, 214 yards, 2 TD
Baylor	Rushing	Richard Reese	9 carries, 62 yards, 2 TD
Baylor	Receiving	Monaray Baldwin	4 receptions, 84 yards, 1 TD

=== At No. 21 BYU ===
Uniform Combination
Helmet	Jersey	Pants

No. 9 Baylor Bears (1–0) vs. No. 21 BYU Cougars (1–0)

Quarter	1	2	3	4	OT	2OT	Total
No. 9 Baylor	0	6	7	7	0	0	20
No. 21 BYU	3	7	10	0	0	6	26

at LaVell Edwards Stadium • Provo, UT

- Date: Saturday, September 10, 2022
- Game time: 9:15 p.m. CDT
- Game weather: clear • Temperature: 82°F
- Game attendance: 63,470
- Referee: Derek Anderson
- TV announcers (ESPN): Mark Jones (play-by-play), Robert Griffin III (analyst), and Quint Kessenich (sideline)

Game information

First Quarter

- (11:31) BYU – Jake Oldroyd 27 yard field goal (Drive: 11 plays, 65 yards, 3:29; BYU 3–0)

Second Quarter

- (1:37) BU – Qualan Jones 1 yard rush, Isaiah Hankins kick missed (Drive: 13 plays, 68 yards, 6:14; BU 6–3)
- (0:02) BYU – Chase Roberts 20 yard pass from Jaren Hall, Jake Oldroyd kick (Drive: 8 plays, 75 yards, 1:35; BYU 10–6)

Third Quarter

- (10:53) BU – Qualan Jones 7 yard rush, Isaiah Hankins kick (Drive: 9 plays 77 yards, 4:02; BU 13–10)
- (6:15) BYU – Jake Oldroyd 39 yard field goal (Drive: 13 plays, 54 yards, 4:38; 13–13)
- (1:28) BYU – Jaren Hall 22 yard pass from Chase Roberts, Jake Oldroyd kick (Drive: 5 plays, 54 yards, 2:36; BYU 20–13)

Fourth Quarter

- (10:01) BU – Ben Sims 4 yard pass from Blake Shapen, Isaiah Hankins kick (Drive: 12 plays, 79 yards, 6:21; 20–20)

Overtime

- (2OT) BYU – Lopini Katoa 3 yard rush, two point conversion failed (Drive: 4 plays, 25 yards; BYU 26–20)

Statistics	BU	BYU
First downs	22	24
Total yards	289	366
Rushes/yards	152/52	83/33
Passing yards	137	283
Passing: Comp–Att–Int	18–28–0	24–40–0
Time of possession	34:15	25:45

Team	Category	Player	Statistics
Baylor	Passing	Blake Shapen	18–28, 137 yards, 1 TD
Baylor	Rushing	Craig Williams	17 carries, 68 yards
Baylor	Receiving	Hal Presley	3 receptions, 31 yards
BYU	Passing	Jaren Hall	23–39, 261 yards, 1 TD
BYU	Rushing	Christopher Brooks	13 carries, 31 yards
BYU	Receiving	Chase Roberts	8 receptions, 122 yards

=== Vs. Texas State ===
Uniform Combination
Helmet	Jersey	Pants

Texas State Bobcats (1–1) vs. No. 17 Baylor Bears (1–1)

Quarter	1	2	3	4	Total
Texas State	0	7	0	0	7
No. 17 Baylor	7	14	7	14	42

at McLane Stadium • Waco, TX

- Date: Saturday, September 17, 2022
- Game time: 11:00 a.m. CDT
- Game weather: sunny • Temperature: 85°F
- Game attendance: 45,597
- Referee: Steve Baron
- TV announcers (FS1): Eric Collins (play-by-play) and Devin Gardner (analyst)

Game information

First Quarter

- (8:35) BU – Richard Reese 14 yard rush, John Mayers kick (Drive: 13 plays, 75 yards, 6:25; BU 7–0)

Second Quarter

- (11:35) BU – Craig Williams 30 yard rush, John Mayers kick (Drive: 9 plays, 69 yards, 3:40; BU 14–0)
- (1:59) TXST – Ashtyn Hawkins 12 yard pass from Layne Hatcher, Seth Keller kick (Drive: 5 plays, 54 yards, 1:42; BU 14–7)
- (0:26) BU – Blake Shapen 36 yard rush, John Mayers kick (Drive: 9 plays, 96 yards, 1:33; BU 21–7)

Third Quarter

- (4:42) BU – Gavin Holmes 28 yard pass from Blake Shapen, John Mayers kick (Drive: 6 plays, 51 yards, 2:24; BU 28–7)

Fourth Quarter

- (14:19) BU – Richard Reese 52 yard rush, John Mayers kick (Drive: 2 plays, 69 yards, 0:41; BU 35–7)
- (12:19) BU – Richard Reese 5 yard rush, John Mayers kick (Drive: 2 plays, 50 yards, 0:27; BU 42–7)

Statistics	TXST	BU
First downs	17	23
Total yards	268	501
Rushes/yards	34/82	37/293
Passing yards	186	208
Passing: Comp–Att–Int	24–36–0	17–28–1
Time of possession	31:32	28:28

Team	Category	Player	Statistics
Texas State	Passing	Layne Hatcher	24–36, 186 yards, 1 TD
Texas State	Rushing	Calvin Hill	12 carries, 41 yards
Texas State	Receiving	Ashtyn Hawkins	13 receptions, 114 yards, 1 TD
Baylor	Passing	Blake Shapen	15–26, 184 yards, 1 TD, 1 interception
Baylor	Rushing	Richard Reese	19 carries, 156 yards, 3 TD
Baylor	Receiving	Gavin Holmes	3 receptions, 46 yards, 1 TD

=== At Iowa State ===
Uniform Combination
Helmet	Jersey	Pants

No. 17 Baylor Bears (2–1) vs. Iowa State Cyclones (3–0)

Quarter	1	2	3	4	Total
No. 17 Baylor	7	10	7	7	31
Iowa State	7	7	0	10	24

at Jack Trice Stadium • Ames, IA

- Date: Saturday, September 24, 2022
- Game time: 11:00 a.m. CDT
- Game weather: sunny • Temperature: 70°F
- Game attendance: 58,069
- Referee: Michael Vandervelde
- TV announcers (ESPN2): Tiffany Greene (play-by-play), Rocky Boiman (analyst), and Dawn Davenport (sideline)

Game information

First Quarter

- (8:40) BU – Ben Sims 12 yard pass from Blake Shapen, John Mayers kick (Drive: 12 plays, 77 yards, 6:20; BU 7–0)
- (2:55) ISU – Jirehl Brock 2 yard pass from Hunter Dekkers, Jace Gilbert kick (Drive: 27 plays, 75 yards, 5:45; 7–7)

Second Quarter

- (12:27) BU – John Mayers 24 yard field goal (Drive: 11 plays, 68 yards, 5:22; BU 10–7)
- (7:09) BU – Dillon Doyle 1 yard pass from Blake Shapen, John Mayers kick (Drive: 9 plays, 70 yards, 3:54; BU 17–7)
- (0:46) ISU – Dimitri Stanley 24 yard pass from Hunter Dekkers, Jace Gilbert kick (Drive: 8 plays, 63 yards, 2:53; BU 17–14)

Third Quarter

- (6:05) BU – Richard Reese 19 yard rush, John Mayers kick (Drive: 10 plays, 93 yards, 5:06; BU 24–14)

Fourth Quarter

- (9:37) BU – Gavin Holmes 38 yard pass from Blake Shapen, John Mayers kick (Drive: 4 plays, 64 yards, 1:42; BU 31–14)
- (7:16) ISU – Jirehl Brock 37 yard rush, Jace Gilbert kick (Drive: 7 plays, 75 yards, 2:21; BU 31–21)
- (0:55) ISU – Jace Gilbert 28 yard field goal (Drive: 10 plays, 71 yards, 1:39; BU 31–24)

Statistics	BU	ISU
First downs	23	17
Total yards	361	350
Rushes/yards	42/123	27/66
Passing yards	238	284
Passing: Comp–Att–Int	19–26–0	23–36–2
Time of possession	34:39	25:21

Team	Category	Player	Statistics
Baylor	Passing	Blake Shapen	19–26, 238 yards, 3 TD
Baylor	Rushing	Richard Reese	21 carries, 78 yards
Baylor	Receiving	Gavin Holmes	3 receptions, 92 yards, 1 TD
Iowa State	Passing	Hunter Dekkers	23–36, 284 yards, 2 TD, 2 interceptions
Iowa State	Rushing	Jirehl Brock	14 carries, 73 yards, 1 TD
Iowa State	Receiving	Jaylin Noel	7 receptions, 120 yards

=== Vs. No. 9 Oklahoma State ===
Uniform Combination
Helmet	Jersey	Pants

No. 9 Oklahoma State Cowboys (3–0) vs. No. 16 Baylor Bears (3–1)

Quarter	1	2	3	4	Total
No. 9 Oklahoma State	7	9	17	3	36
No. 16 Baylor	3	0	22	0	25

at McLane Stadium • Waco, TX

- Date: Saturday, October 1, 2022
- Game time: 2:30 p.m. CDT
- Game weather: sunny • Temperature: 84°F
- Game attendance: 47,979
- Referee: David Alvarez
- TV announcers (FOX): Jason Benetti (play-by-play) and Brock Huard (analyst)

Game information

First Quarter

- (10:46) BU - John Mayers 34 yd field goal (Drive: 10 plays, 59 yards, 04:14; BU 3–0)
- (5:24) OKST - Bryson Green 8 yd pass from Spencer Sanders (Tanner Brown kick) (Drive: 15 plays, 75 yards, 05:22; OKST 7–3)

Second Quarter

- (13:38) OKST - 0 yd safety (OKST 9–3)
- (0:27) OKST - Spencer Sanders 1 yd rush (Tanner Brown kick) (Drive: 10 plays, 55 yards, 03:16; OKST 16–3)

Third Quarter

- (14:47) OKST - Jaden Nixon 98 yd kickoff return (Tanner Brown kick) (OKST 23–3)
- (12:23) BU - Monaray Baldwin 49 yd pass from Blake Shapen (John Mayers kick) (Drive: 6 plays, 73 yards, 02:24; OKST 23–10)
- (7:58) BU - Richard Reese 1 yd rush (John Mayers kick) (Drive: 5 plays, 37 yards, 02:30; OKST 23–17)
- (7:14) OKST - Dominic Richardson 1 yd rush (Tanner Brown kick) (Drive: 2 plays, 50 yards, 0:44; OKST 30–17)
- (3:38) OKST - Tanner Brown 19 yd field goal (Drive: 6 plays, 32 yards, 01:48; OKST 33–17)
- (2:14) BU - Monaray Baldwin 70 yd pass from Blake Shapen (Gavin Holmes pass) (Drive: 4 plays, 75 yards, 01:24; OKST 33–25)

Fourth Quarter

- (4:48) OKST - Tanner Brown 26 yd field goal (Drive: 8 plays, 24 yards, 04:04; OKST 36–25)

Statistics	OKST	BU
First downs	23	31
Total yards	379	457
Rushes/yards	46/166	30/112
Passing yards	213	345
Passing: Comp–Att–Int	21–30–1	28–40–2
Time of possession	30:46	29:14

Team	Category	Player	Statistics
Oklahoma State	Passing	Spencer Sanders	20–29, 181 yards, 1 TD, 1 interception
Oklahoma State	Rushing	Spencer Sanders	14 carries, 75 yards, 1 TD
Oklahoma State	Receiving	Brennan Presley	8 receptions, 86 yards
Baylor	Passing	Blake Shapen	28–40, 345 yards, 2 TD, 2 interceptions
Baylor	Rushing	Richard Reese	17 carries, 85 yards, 1 TD
Baylor	Receiving	Monaray Baldwin	7 receptions, 174 yards, 2 TD

=== At West Virginia ===
Baylor Bears (3–2) vs. West Virginia Mountaineers (2–3)

Quarter	1	2	3	4	Total
Bears	3	21	7	9	40
Mountaineers	7	10	14	12	43

at Milan Puskar Stadium • Morgantown, WV

- Date: Thursday, October 13, 2022
- Game time: 6:30 p.m. CDT
- Game weather: Clear • Temperature: 54 °F (12 °C)
- Game attendance: 45,293
- Referee: Kevin Mar
- TV announcers (FS1): Noah Eagle (play-by-play) and Mark Helfrich (analyst)

Game information

First Quarter

- WVU – Tony Mathis Jr. 7-yard run (Casey Legg kick), 10:30. Mountaineers 7–0. Drive: 8 plays, 65 yards, 3:18.
- BAY – John Mayers 40-yard field goal, 4:23. Mountaineers 7–3. Drive: 14 plays, 71 yards, 6:00.

Second Quarter

- BAY – Ben Sims 1-yard run (John Mayers kick), 13:34. Bears 10–7. Drive: 5 plays, 85 yards, 2:32.
- BAY – Gavin Holmes 35-yard pass from Blake Shapen (John Mayers kick), 10:52. Bears 17–7. Drive: 3 plays, 70 yards, 1:23.
- WVU – Casey Legg 23-yard field goal, 4:22. Bears 17–10. Drive: 13 plays, 69 yards, 6:30.
- WVU – Jasir Cox 65-yard fumble return (Casey Legg kick), 2:41. Tied 17–17.
- BAY – Craig Williams 39-yard pass from Blake Shapen (John Mayers kick), 1:14. Bears 24–17. Drive: 5 plays, 75 yards, 1:27.

Third Quarter

- WVU – Kaden Prather 24-yard pass from JT Daniels (Casey Legg kick), 10:19. Tied 24–24. Drive: 10 plays, 75 yards, 4:41.
- BAY – Hal Presley 2-yard pass from Kyron Drones (John Mayers kick), 5:21. Bears 31–24. Drive: 13 plays, 74 yards, 4:51.
- WVU – Justin Johnson Jr. 1-yard run (Casey Legg kick), 1:42. Tied 31–31. Drive: 8 plays, 75 yards, 3:39.

Fourth Quarter

- BAY – Qualan Jones 4-yard run (kick blocked), 13:39. Bears 37–31. Drive: 6 plays, 74 yards, 2:57.
- WVU – Jacolby Spells defensive PAT conversion, 13:39. Bears 37–33.
- WVU – Tony Mathis Jr. 34-yard run (Casey Legg kick), 7:06. Mountaineers 40–37. Drive: 6 plays, 72 yards, 1:55.
- BAY – John Mayers 44-yard field goal, 1:40. Tied 40–40. Drive: 4 plays, 0 yards, 1:32.
- WVU – Casey Legg 22-yard field goal, 0:33. Mountaineers 43–40. Drive: 8 plays, 61 yards, 1:00.

Statistics	BU	WVU
First downs	28	26
Total yards	590	500
Rushes/yards	35–169	37–217
Passing yards	421	283
Passing: Comp–Att–Int	21–37–1	24–37–1
Time of possession	29:35	30:25

Team	Category	Player	Statistics
Baylor	Passing	Blake Shapen	14/22, 326 yards, 2 TD
Baylor	Rushing	Richard Reese	13 rushes, 57 yards
Baylor	Receiving	Gavin Holmes	7 receptions, 210 yards, TD
West Virginia	Passing	JT Daniels	24/37, 283 yards, TD, INT
West Virginia	Rushing	Tony Mathis Jr.	22 rushes, 163 yards, 2 TD
West Virginia	Receiving	Kaden Prather	8 receptions, 109 yards, TD

=== Vs. Kansas ===
Kansas Jayhawks (5-2) vs. Baylor Bears (3-3)

Quarter	1	2	3	4	Total
Jayhawks	3	0	7	13	23
Bears	14	14	0	7	35

at McLane Stadium • Waco, Texas

- Date: Saturday, October 22, 2022
- Game time: 11:00 pm CDT
- Game weather: Sunny • Temperature: 75 °F (24 °C)
- Game attendance: 48,822
- Referee: Michael Vandervelde
- TV announcers (ESPN2): Anish Shroff (play-by-play), Brock Osweiler (analyst), and Taylor McGregor (sideline)

Game information

First quarter

- 11:05 BU Blake Shapen 17 yard pass to Monaray Baldwin (#ohn Mayers kick), 7–41 02:52, BU 7–0
- 10:15 BU 29 Richard Reese 14 yard rush (John Mayers kick), 2–25 0:40, BU 14–0
- 3:13 KU Jacob Borcila 30 yard field goal, 12–62 7:02, BU 14–3

Second quarter

- 11:18 BU 15 Kyron Drones 4 yard rush (John Mayers kick), 16–73 6:55, BU 21–3
- 0:42 BU Jordan Nabors 10 yard rush (John Mayers kick), 15–99 07:23, BU 28–3

Third quarter

- 7:35 KU Devin Neal 2 yard rush (Jacob Borcila kick), 3–9 1:07, BU 28–10

Fourth quarter

- 14:33 KU Jason Bean 24 yard pass to Quentin Skinner (Jason Bean pass to Mason Fairchild failed), 11–95, 4:07 BU 28–16
- 6:29 KU Jason Bean 4 yard rush (Jacob Borcila kick), 8–93, 2:56, BU 28–23
- 2:37 BU Richard Reese 2 yard rush (John Mayers kick), 7–69 3:52, BU 35–23

Statistics	KU	BU
First downs	11	28
Plays–yards	49–288	83–437
Rushes–yards	22–56	57–273
Passing yards	232	164
Passing: comp–att–int	16–27–1	17–26–2
Turnovers		
Time of possession	19:50	40:10

Team	Category	Player	Statistics
Kansas	Passing	Jason Bean	16/27, 232 yards, TD
Kansas	Rushing	Devin Neal	10 carries, 32 yards, TD
Kansas	Receiving	Quentin Skinner	4 receptions, 66 yards, TD
Baylor	Passing	Blake Shapen	17/26, 164 yards, TD, 2 INTs
Baylor	Rushing	Richard Reese	31 carries, 186 yards, 2 TDs
Baylor	Receiving	Hal Presley	3 receptions, 39 yards

=== At Texas Tech ===
Baylor Bears (4-3) vs. Texas Tech Red Raiders (4-3)

Quarter	1	2	3	4	Total
Bears	3	14	7	21	45
Red Raiders	0	3	14	0	17

at Jones AT&T Stadium, Lubbock, Texas

- Date: October 29
- Game time: 6:30 p.m. CDT
- Game weather: Clear, 63 °F (17 °C)
- Game attendance: 60,705
- Referee: David Alvarez
- TV announcers (ESPN2): Clay Matvick (play-by-play), Rocky Boiman (analyst), and Dawn Davenport (sideline)
- Box score, Recap

Game information
First quarter
- BAY – John Mayers 48-yard field goal, 4:39. Bears 3–0. Drive: 9 plays, 30 yards, 4:06.

Second quarter

- TTU – Trey Wolff 33-yard field goal, 8:09. Tied 3–3. Drive: 6 plays, 48 yards, 1:33.
- BAY – Richard Reese 1-yard run (John Mayers kick), 3:39. Bears 10–3. Drive: 9 plays, 75 yards, 4:30.
- BAY – Richard Reese 2-yard run (John Mayers kick), 0:13. Bears 17–3. Drive: 10 plays, 74 yards, 1:38.

Third quarter

- BAY – Hal Presley 9-yard pass from Blake Shapen (John Mayers kick), 11:09. Bears 24–3. Drive: 7 plays, 34 yards, 3:07.
- TTU – Henry Teeter 1-yard pass from Behren Morton (Trey Wolff kick), 7:34. Bears 24–10. Drive: 15 plays, 75 yards, 3:35.
- TTU – Behren Morton 8-yard run (Trey Wolff kick), 2:46. Bears 24–17. Drive: 8 plays, 40 yards, 2:09.

Fourth quarter

- BAY – Richard Reese 1-yard run (John Mayers kick), 12:46. Bears 31–17. Drive: 11 plays, 75 yards, 5:00.
- BAY – A. J. McCarty 18-yard interception return (John Mayers kick), 4:04. Bears 38–17.
- BAY – Qualan Jones 17-yard run (John Mayers kick), 0:45. Bears 45–17. Drive: 3 plays, 26 yards, 1:38.

Statistics	BU	TTU
First downs	27	23
Plays–yards	89–442	74–308
Rushes–yards	59–231	36–149
Passing yards	211	159
Passing: comp–att–int	19–30–0	12–38–5
Turnovers	1	5
Time of possession	40:17	19:43

Team	Category	Player	Statistics
Baylor	Passing	Blake Shapen	19/30, 211 yards, 1 TD
Baylor	Rushing	Richard Reese	36 carries, 148 yards, 3 TDs
Baylor	Receiving	Gavin Holmes	5 receptions, 77 yards
Texas Tech	Passing	Behren Morton	11/34, 152 yards, 1 TD, 3 INTs
Texas Tech	Rushing	Tahj Brooks	16 carries, 98 yards
Texas Tech	Receiving	Xavier White	2 receptions, 45 yards

=== At Oklahoma ===
Baylor Bears (5–3, 3–2) vs. Oklahoma Sooners (5–3, 2–3)

Quarter	1	2	3	4	Total
Bears	14	10	7	7	38
Sooners	14	7	7	7	35

at Gaylord Family Oklahoma Memorial Stadium • Norman, OK

- Date: Saturday, November 5, 2022
- Game time: 2:00 p.m. CDT
- Game weather: •Sunny Temperature: 57
- Game attendance: 83,546
- Referee: Kevin Boitmann
- TV announcers (ESPN+): Courtney Lyle (play-by-play), Ryan Leaf (analyst), and Tori Petry (sideline)

Game information

First Quarter

- (11:13) OKLA – Dillon Gabriel 10 yard rush, Zach Schmit kick (Drive: 10 plays, 75 yards, 3:47; OU 7–0)
- (5:54) BAY – Craig Williams 11 yard rush, John Mayers kick (Drive: 11 plays, 63 yards, 5:11; Tied 7–7)
- (3:50) BAY – Jordan Nabors 6 yard rush, John Mayers kick (Drive: 3 plays, 26 yards, 1:11; BU 14–7)
- (3:01) OKLA – Dillon Gabriel 63 yard pass to Marvin Mims, Zach Schmit kick (Drive: 3 plays, 75 yards, 0:49; Tied 14–14)

Second Quarter

- (12:59) BAY – John Mayers 49 yard FG (Drive: 4 plays, 2 yards, 1:51; BU 17–14)
- (9:06) BAY – Craig Williams 1 yard rush, John Mayers kick (Drive: 4 plays, 65 yards, 1:56; BU 24–14)
- (6:46) OKLA – Eric Gray 5 yard rush, Zach Schmit kick (Drive: 9 plays, 75 yards, 2:20; BU 24–21)

Third Quarter

- (10:56) BAY – Richard Reese 2 yard rush, John Mayers kick (Drive: 9 plays, 75 yards, 4:04; BU 31–21)
- (4:42) OKLA – Dillon Gabriel 9 yard pass to Drake Stoops, Zach Schmit kick (Drive: 7 plays, 77 yards, 2:16; BU 31–28)

Fourth Quarter

- (9:15) BAY – Qualan Jones 10 yard rush, John Mayers kick (Drive: 11 plays, 80 yards, 5:35; BU 38–28)
- (4:05) OKLA – Eric Gray 1 yard rush, Zach Schmit kick (Drive: 13 plays, 75 yards, 5:10; BU 38–35)

Statistics	BU	OU
First downs	24	29
Total yards	413	499
Rushes/yards	48/281	45/238
Passing yards	132	261
Passing: Comp–Att–Int	14–23–1	22–24–3
Time of possession	33:42	26:18

Team	Category	Player	Statistics
Baylor	Passing	Blake Shapen	14/23, 132 yards, 1 INT
Baylor	Rushing	Craig Williams	25 carries, 192 yards, 2 TD
Baylor	Receiving	Josh Cameron	5 receptions, 72 yards
Oklahoma	Passing	Dillon Gabriel	22/34, 261 yards, 2 TD's, 3 INT's
Oklahoma	Rushing	Eric Gray	23 carries, 106 yards, 2 TD
Oklahoma	Receiving	Eric Gray	8 receptions, 58 yards

=== Vs. No. 19 Kansas State ===
Team	1	2	3	4	Total
• No. 19 Kansas State	0	17	7	7	31
Baylor	0	3	0	0	3

- Date: November 12
- Location: McLane Stadium, (Waco, TX)
- Game start: 6:00 p.m. CST
- Game attendance: 47,686
- Game weather: 44 degrees, clear, wind N at 7mph
- Referee: Tuta Salaam
- TV announcers (FS1): Adam Alexander (play-by-play) and Devin Gardner (analyst)
- Sources: K-State Box Score

Statistics	Kansas State	Baylor
First downs	30	17
Total yards	405	306
Rushing yards	184	103
Passing yards	221	203
Turnovers	0	2
Time of possession	37:37	22:23
Penalties−yards	4−23	6−51

Team	Category	Player	Statistics
Kansas State	Passing	Will Howard	19/27, 196 YDS, 3 TD
Kansas State	Rushing	Deuce Vaughn	25 CAR, 106 YDS, 18 Long
Kansas State	Receiving	Ben Sinnott	7 REC, 89 YDS, 2 TD, 23 Long
Baylor	Passing	Blake Shapen	22/38, 203 YDS, 2 INT
Baylor	Rushing	Richard Reese	9 CAR, 54 YDS, 14 Long
Baylor	Receiving	Josh Cameron	6 REC, 83 YDS, 25 Long

Scoring summary

Quarter	Time	Drive			Team	Scoring information	Score	
Quarter	Time	Plays	Yards	TOP	Team	Scoring information	KSU	BAY
2nd	14:20	12	97	5:04	KSU	Ben Sinnott 15-yard touchdown reception from Will Howard, Ty Zenter kick good	7	0
2nd	5:57	12	47	5:23	KSU	47-yard field goal by Ty Zentner	10	0
2nd	2:09	7	66	2:45	KSU	Deuce Vaughn 20-yard touchdown reception from Will Howard, Ty Zenter kick good	17	0
2nd	0:00	11	56	2:09	BAY	37-yard field goal by John Mayers	17	3
3rd	1:53	12	80	4:57	KSU	Ben Sinnott 19-yard touchdown reception from Will Howard, Ty Zenter kick good	24	3
4th	14:06	5	20	1:21	KSU	DJ Giddens 1-yard touchdown run, Ty Zenter kick good	31	3
"TOP" = time of possession. For other American football terms, see Glossary of American football.							31	3

=== Vs. No. 4 TCU (Big Noon Kickoff) ===
No. 4 TCU Horned Frogs (10-0, 7-0) vs Baylor Bears (6-4, 4-3)

Quarter	1	2	3	4	Total
No. 4 Horned Frogs	7	7	6	9	29
Bears	7	7	0	14	28

at McLane Stadium • Waco, Texas

- Date: November 19
- Game time: 11:00 a.m. CST
- Game weather: Temperature: 39 °F (4 °C) • Wind: N at 9 miles per hour (14 km/h) • Weather: Cloudy
- Game attendance: 44,393
- Referee: Scott Campbell
- TV announcers (FOX): Jason Benetti (play-by-play), Brock Huard (analyst), and Bruce Feldman (sideline)

Game information

1st quarter
2nd quarter
3rd quarter
4th quarter

Statistics	No. 4 TCU	Baylor
First downs	20	25
Total yards	442	501
Rushes/yards	27-115	46-232
Passing yards	327	269
Passing: Comp–Att–Int	24-36-1	21-30-1
Time of possession	26:02	33:58

Team	Category	Player	Statistics
No. 4 TCU	Passing	Max Duggan	24/35, 327 yards, TD, INT
No. 4 TCU	Rushing	Max Duggan	8 carries, 50 yards, TD
No. 4 TCU	Receiving	Taye Barber	5 receptions, 108 yards
Baylor	Passing	Blake Shapen	21/30, 269 yards, TD, INT
Baylor	Rushing	Craig Williams	19 carries, 112 yards
Baylor	Receiving	Monaray Baldwin	6 receptions, 123 yards

=== At No. 23 Texas ===
Team	1	2	3	4	Total
Baylor	9	10	0	9	28
• No. 23 Texas	14	3	7	14	38

- Date: November 25
- Location: Darrell K Royal–Texas Memorial Stadium (Austin, TX)
- Game start: 11:00 a.m.
- Game attendance: 94,076
- Game weather: Rain
- Referee: Kevin Mar
- TV announcers (ESPN): Mark Jones (play-by-play), Robert Griffin III (color), and Quint Kessenich (sideline)
- Sources: Stats

Statistics	Baylor	Texas
First downs	18	22
Total yards	280	402
Rushing yards	101	208
Passing yards	179	194
Turnovers	1	1
Time of possession	33:24	26:36

Team	Category	Player	Statistics
Baylor	Passing	Blake Shapen	18–36, 179 yards, 2 TD, 1 INT
Baylor	Rushing	Reese Richard	15 carries, 54 yards
Baylor	Receiving	Josh Cameron	4 receptions, 48 yards
Texas	Passing	Quinn Ewers	12–16, 194 yards
Texas	Rushing	Bijan Robinson	29 carries, 179 yards, 2 TDs
Texas	Receiving	Ja'Tavion Sanders	4 receptions, 65 yards

Scoring summary

Quarter	Time	Drive			Team	Scoring information	Score	
Quarter	Time	Plays	Yards	TOP	Team	Scoring information	Baylor	Texas
1st	9:44				BAY	Intentional Grounding in the endzone on Quinn Ewers	2	0
1st	6:54	5	62	2:43	BAY	Jaylen Ellis 47-yard touchdown reception from Blake Shapen, John Mayers kick good	9	0
1st	3:54	7	75	3:00	TEX	Quinn Ewers 3-yard touchdown run, Will Stone kick good	9	7
1st	1:35	3	29	1:20	TEX	Bijan Robinson 2-yard touchdown run, Will Stone kick good	9	14
2nd	7:54	18	63	8:41	BAY	30-yard field goal by John Mayers	12	14
2nd	5:50	6	55	2:04	TEX	38-yard field goal by Bert Auburn	12	17
2nd	0:40	5	45	0:32	BAY	Ben Sims 14-yard touchdown reception from Blake Shapen, John Mayers kick good	19	17
3rd	2:21	10	78	3:19	TEX	Roschon Johnson 1-yard touchdown run, Bert Auburn kick good	19	24
4th	13:30				BAY	Fumble recovery returned 16 yards for touchdown by Gabe Hall, 2-point pass good	27	24
4th	8:25	11	75	5:05	TEX	Bijan Robinson 1-yard touchdown run, Bert Auburn kick good	27	31
4th	3:48	6	42	2:40	TEX	Roschon Johnson 11-yard touchdown run, Bert Auburn kick good	27	38
"TOP" = time of possession. For other American football terms, see Glossary of American football.							BAY	TEX

=== Vs. Air Force (Armed Forces Bowl) ===
Armed Forces Bowl - Air Force Falcons (9-3) vs Baylor Bears (6-6)

Quarter	1	2	3	4	Total
Bears	0	7	0	8	15
Falcons	9	0	14	7	30

at Amon G. Carter Stadium • Fort Worth, TX

- Date: December 22
- Game time: 6:30 p.m. CST
- Game weather: Temperature: 13 °F (−11 °C) • Wind: N at 20 miles per hour (32 km/h) • Weather: Clear
- Game attendance: 43,875
- Referee: Jeremy Valentine
- TV announcers (ESPN/Bowl Season Radio): Brian Custer (play-by-play), Dustin Fox (analyst), and Lauren Sisler (sideline)/Brian Estridge (play-by-play), Landry Burdine (analyst), and Chris Mycoskie (sideline)
- Box score
  Scoring summary
  Quarter	Time	Drive			Team	Scoring information	Score	
  Quarter	Time	Plays	Yards	TOP	Team	Scoring information	Baylor	Air Force
  1	5:20	15	55	8:44	Air Force	Brad Roberts 2-yard touchdown run, Matthew Dapore kick failed (blocked)	0	6
  1	1:13	5	38	2:05	Air Force	37-yard field goal by Matthew Dapore	0	9
  2	0:05	6	47	1:35	Baylor	Hal Presley 8-yard touchdown reception from Blake Shapen, John Mayers kick good	7	9
  3	12:28	5	83	2:32	Air Force	Haaziq Daniels 2-yard touchdown run, Matthew Dapore kick good	7	16
  3	2:29	7	64	3:21	Air Force	Caleb Rillos 15-yard touchdown reception from Haaziq Daniels, Matthew Dapore kick good	7	23
  4	12:40	7	42	3:15	Air Force	Brad Roberts 1-yard touchdown run, Matthew Dapore kick good	7	30
  4	3:34	4	85	0:51	Baylor	Gavin Holmes 14-yard touchdown reception from Blake Shapen, 2-point rush good	15	30
  "TOP" = time of possession. For other American football terms, see Glossary of American football.							15	30

Statistics	BU	AF
First downs	11	20
Total yards	230	379
Rushes/yards	26/42	67/276
Passing yards	188	103
Passing: Comp–Att–Int	11–23–0	4–7–0
Time of possession	19:57	40:03

Team	Category	Player	Statistics
Baylor	Passing	Blake Shapen	11/23, 188 yards, 2 TDs
Baylor	Rushing	Craig Williams	7 carries, 25 yards
Baylor	Receiving	Jaylen Ellis	1 reception, 57 yards
Air Force	Passing	Haaziq Daniels	4/7, 103 yards, 1 TD
Air Force	Rushing	Brad Roberts	37 carries, 116 yards, 2 TDs
Air Force	Receiving	Amari Terry	1 reception, 68 yards

== Personnel ==
=== Roster ===
2022 Baylor Bears Football
Quarterback: 12 Blake Shapen – sophomore (6'0, 200); 13 Luke Anthony – 7th year senior (6'1, 208); 17 Landry Kinne – junior (6'0, 185); 18 Brayson McHenry – freshman (5'11, 193); Running back: 0 Craig Williams – junior (5'9, 168); 22 Taye McWilliams – junior (6'1, 213); 23 Jordan Jenkins – (redshirt) freshman (6'1, 222); 25 Jacoby Clarke – junior (5'11, 231); 28 Qualan Jones – junior (5'10, 242); 29 Richard Reese – freshman (5'9, 175); 85 Kaian Roberts-Day – freshman (6'3, 269); Wide receiver: 6 Gavin Holmes – 6th year senior (5'11, 200); 14 Armani Winfield – freshman (6'2, 203); 15 Tripp Mitchell – junior (6'1, 192); 16 Hal Presley – sophomore (6'3, 199); 18 Jordan Nabors – freshman (5'11, 182); 19 Javon Gipson – (redshirt) freshman (6'3, 200); 24 Cameron Bonner – (redshirt) freshman (5'11, 178); 26 Jonah Burton – (redshirt) freshman (5'11, 203); 34 Josh Cameron – (redshirt) freshman (6'1, 216); 80 Monaray Baldwin – sophomore (5'9, 164); 81 Jonathan Davidson – sophomore (6'1, 206); 83 Elijah Bean – (redshirt) freshman (6'4, 220); 84 Jaylen Ellis – junior (6'3, 184); Placekicker: 95 John Mayers – 5th year senior (5'11, 189); 96 Bryce Boland – sophomore (5'11, 172); 98 Isaiah Hankins – sophomore (6'0, 189); 99 Noah Rauschenberg – senior (6'1, 204); Punter: 1 Issac Power – 5th year senior (6'1, 201)	Offensive line: 50 Connor Heffernan – (redshirt) freshman (6'4, 287); 54 Timothy Dawn – freshman (6'2, 304); 57 Coleton Price – freshman (6'2, 311); 58 Gavin Byers – junior (6'5, 310); 62 Ryan Lengyel – (redshirt) freshman (6'5, 302); 63 Grant Miller – 6th year senior (6'4, 312); 64 Khalil Keith – 6th year senior (6'5, 314); 65 Micah Mazzccua – sophomore (6'5, 331); 66 Jacob Gall – 6th year senior (6'2, 299); 69 Clayton Collier – (redshirt) freshman (6'2, 272); 70 Bryce Simpson – freshman (6'5, 340); 71 MJ Ruhman – (redshirt) freshman (6'4, 282); 72 Mose Jeffery – 5th year senior (6'4, 321); 73 George Maile – freshman (6'3, 298); 74 Kaden Sieracki – freshman (6'8, 314); 75 Elijah Ellis – junior (6'6, 339); 76 Connor Galvin – 5th year senior (6'7, 302); 77 Tate Williams – (redshirt) freshman (6'4, 284); 79 Alvin Ebosele – freshman (6'6, 308); Defensive line: 9 TJ Franklin – senior (6'5, 265); 54 Brayden Utley – 5th year senior (6'1, 275); 57 Prince Ugoh – (redshirt) freshman (6'1, 235); 59 Devonte Tezino – freshman (6'5, 292); 62 Siaki Ika – junior (6'4, 358); 90 Jaxon Player – 5th year senior (6'0, 299); 94 BoChao Jin – junior (6'0, 264); 95 Gabe Hall – junior (6'6, 296); 96 Cole Maxwell – 6th year senior (6'5, 285); 97 Cooper Lanz – (redshirt) freshman (6'3, 270); 98 Chidi Ogbonnaya – 6th year senior (6'5, 302); 99 Tre Emory – freshman (6'2, 318); Tight end: 8 Ben Sims – 5th year senior (6'5, 258); 43 Gavin Yates – sophomore (6'3, 248); 44 Mark Patton – junior (6'4, 238); 82 Cody Mladenka – freshman (6'4, 241); 87 Kelsey Johnson – freshman (6'2, 243); 89 Drake Dabney – junior (6'5, 251); Long snapper: 26 Garrison Grimes – (redshirt) freshman (6'2, 215); 40 Corbin Robertson – senior (6'4, 238)	Linebacker: 2 Matt Jones – junior (6'3, 224); 5 Dillon Doyle – 5th year senior (6'3, 240); 32 Carmello Jones – freshman (6'2, 222); 33 Will Williams – junior (6'2, 211); 35 Jackie Marshall – (redshirt) freshman (6'3, 281); 36 Tyrone M. Brown – (redshirt) freshman (5'11, 222); 41 Brooks Miller – sophomore (6'1, 225); 42 Jeremy Evans – freshman (6'1, 209); 44 Josh White – sophomore (6'0, 229); 47 Caleb Parker – sophomore (5'11, 213); 49 Will Garner – sophomore (6'2, 220); 53 Ben Hamilton – sophomore (6'0, 187); 56 Braden Strauss – sophomore (5'11, 215); 58 Jaden Maronen – (redshirt) freshman (5'10, 226); Outside linebacker: 7 Bryson Jackson – 6th year senior (6'2, 204); 46 Tony Anyanwu – sophomore (6'2, 243); 51 Kyler Jordan – freshman (6'2, 225); 55 Garmon Randolph – junior (6'7, 247); 93 Victor Obi – senior (6'5, 220); Defensive back: 3 Mark Milton – 5th year senior (6'2, 191); 4 Christian Morgan – 5th year senior (6'1, 211); 11 Lorando Johnson – sophomore (6'0, 193); 12 Alfonzo Allen – freshman (5'11, 183); 13 Al Walcott – senior (6'2, 219); 16 Mike Harris – sophomore (5'10, 168); 19 AJ McCarty – sophomore (5'11, 180); 20 Devin Lemear – (redshirt) freshman (5'11, 183); 21 Chateau Reed – sophomore (6'2, 193); 22 Reggie Bush – freshman (6'0, 183); 24 Corey Gordon Jr. – freshman (6'2, 175); 25 Byron Hanspard Jr. – 5th year senior (6'0, 182); 27 Tevin Williams III – (redshirt) freshman (6'1, 188); 28 Devin Bobby – freshman (5'10, 174); 29 Romario Noel – (redshirt) freshman (6'3, 212); 30 Michael Allen – freshman (5'8, 177); 31 Griffin Speaks – junior (5'11, 180); 39 Michael Mastrodicasa – (redshirt) freshman (6'0, 199); 41 Cisco Caston – (redshirt) freshman (6'1, 210); 48 Collin Losack – junior (5'10, 180)

=== Coaching staff ===
Coach	Title	Year at Baylor	Previous job
Dave Aranda	Head coach	3rd	LSU (DC)
Jeff Grimes	OC/TE	2nd	BYU (OC)
Caleb Collins	OLB	3rd	LSU Tigers football (Quality Control Coach – defense)
Ron Roberts	DC/ILB	3rd	Louisiana (DC)
Shawn Bell	QB	6th	Cedar Ridge High School (HC)
Kevin Curtis	CB	2nd	SMU (CB)
Dennis Johnson	DL	3rd	LSU (DL)
Justin Johnson	RB	3rd	Houston (RB)
Eric Mateos	OL	2nd	BYU (OL)
Ronnie Wheat	S	1st	Nevada (S)

== Rankings ==
Ranking movements Legend: ██ Increase in ranking ██ Decrease in ranking — = Not ranked RV = Received votes
	Week															
Poll	Pre	1	2	3	4	5	6	7	8	9	10	11	12	13	14	Final
AP	10	9	17	17	16	RV	RV	—	—	RV	—	—	—	—	—	—
Coaches	10	8	19	17	14	22	23	RV	RV	RV	—	—	—	—	—	—
CFP	Not released									—	—	—	—	—	—	Not released
