= 2022 Air Force Falcons football team =

American college football season

2022 Air Force Falcons football

Armed Forces Bowl champion

Armed Forces Bowl, W 30–15 vs. Baylor
- Conference: Mountain West Conference
- Mountain Division
- Record: 10–3 (5–3 MW)
- Head coach: Troy Calhoun (16th season)
- Offensive coordinator: Mike Thiessen (14th season)
- Offensive scheme: Triple option
- Defensive coordinator: Brian Knorr (1st season)
- Base defense: 3–4
- Captains: Brad Roberts; Isaac Cochran; Haaziq Daniels; TD Blackmon; Vince Sanford
- Home stadium: Falcon Stadium

Uniform
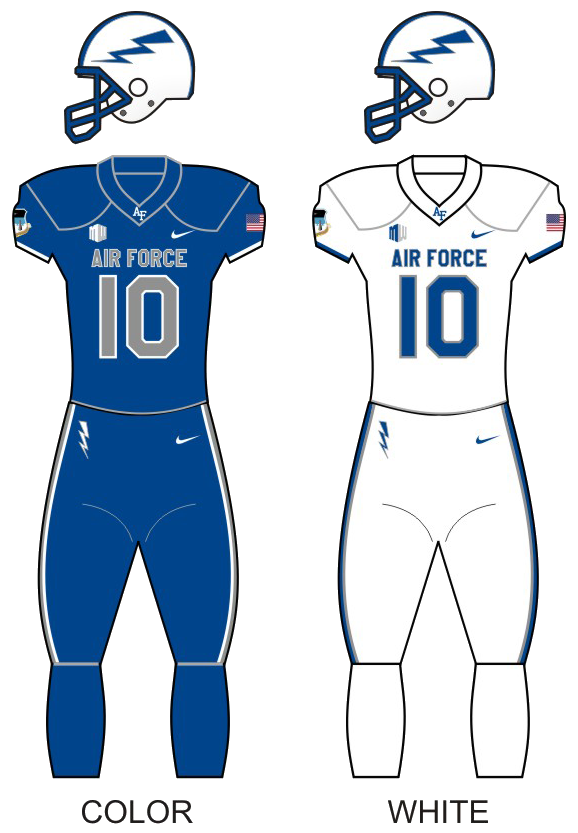

2022 Mountain West Conference football standings
| | Conf. | | | Overall |
| Team | W | | L | W | | L |
|---|---|---|---|---|---|---|
Mountain Division
| Boise State xy | 8 | – | 0 | 10 | – | 4 |
| Air Force | 5 | – | 3 | 10 | – | 3 |
| Wyoming | 5 | – | 3 | 7 | – | 6 |
| Utah State | 5 | – | 3 | 6 | – | 7 |
| Colorado State | 3 | – | 5 | 3 | – | 9 |
| New Mexico | 0 | – | 8 | 2 | – | 10 |
West Division
| No. 24 Fresno State xy$ | 7 | – | 1 | 10 | – | 4 |
| San Diego State | 5 | – | 3 | 7 | – | 6 |
| San Jose State | 5 | – | 3 | 7 | – | 5 |
| UNLV | 3 | – | 5 | 5 | – | 7 |
| Hawaii | 2 | – | 6 | 3 | – | 10 |
| Nevada | 0 | – | 8 | 2 | – | 10 |
Championship: Fresno State 28, Boise State 16
$ – Conference champion; x – Division champion/co-champions; y – Championship game participant; Rankings from AP Poll

The 2022 Air Force Falcons football team represented the United States Air Force Academy as a member of the Mountain Division in the Mountain West Conference (MW) during the 2022 NCAA Division I FBS football season. Led by 16th-year head coach Troy Calhoun, the Falcons compiled an overall record of 10–3 with a mark of 5–3 in conference play, placing in a three-way tie for second in the MW's Mountain Division. Air Force was invited to the Armed Forces Bowl, where the Falcons defeated Baylor. The team played home games at Falcon Stadium in Colorado Springs, Colorado.

== Schedule ==
| Date | Time | Opponent | Site | TV | Result | Attendance |
|---|---|---|---|---|---|---|
| September 3 | 11:00 a.m. | No. 21 (FCS) Northern Iowa* | Falcon Stadium; Colorado Springs, CO | Altitude | W 48–17 | 31,180 |
| September 10 | 1:30 p.m. | Colorado* | Falcon Stadium; Colorado Springs, CO | CBS | W 41–10 | 33,647 |
| September 16 | 6:00 p.m. | at Wyoming | War Memorial Stadium; Laramie, WY | CBSSN | L 14–17 | 18,277 |
| September 23 | 6:00 p.m. | Nevada | Falcon Stadium; Colorado Springs, CO | FS1 | W 48–20 | 20,506 |
| October 1 | 10:00 a.m. | Navy* | Falcon Stadium; Colorado Springs, CO (Commander-in-Chief's Trophy) | CBS | W 13–10 | 36,947 |
| October 8 | 5:00 p.m. | at Utah State | Maverik Stadium; Logan, UT | FS1 | L 27–34 | 19,105 |
| October 15 | 8:30 p.m. | at UNLV | Allegiant Stadium; Paradise, NV | CBSSN | W 42–7 | 23,847 |
| October 22 | 5:00 p.m. | Boise State | Falcon Stadium; Colorado Springs, CO | CBSSN | L 14–19 | 25,254 |
| November 5 | 9:30 a.m. | vs. Army* | Globe Life Field; Arlington, TX (Lockheed Martin Commanders Classic, Commander-in-Chief's Trophy) | CBS | W 13–7 | 33,912 |
| November 12 | 1:30 p.m. | New Mexico | Falcon Stadium; Colorado Springs, CO | CBSSN | W 35–3 | 20,827 |
| November 19 | 7:00 p.m. | Colorado State | Falcon Stadium; Colorado Springs, CO | FS2 | W 24–12 | 20,121 |
| November 26 | 7:00 p.m. | at San Diego State | Snapdragon Stadium; San Diego, CA | CBSSN | W 13–3 | 25,223 |
| December 22 | 5:30 p.m. | vs. Baylor* | Amon G. Carter Stadium; Fort Worth, TX (Armed Forces Bowl) | ESPN | W 30–15 | 43,875 |
*Non-conference game; Rankings from STATS Poll released prior to the game; All times are in Mountain time

== Rankings ==
Ranking movements Legend: RV = Received votes
| | Week | | | | | | | | | | | | | | | |
| Poll | Pre | 1 | 2 | 3 | 4 | 5 | 6 | 7 | 8 | 9 | 10 | 11 | 12 | 13 | 14 | Final |
|---|---|---|---|---|---|---|---|---|---|---|---|---|---|---|---|---|
| AP | RV | RV | RV | | | | | | | | | | | | | RV |
| Coaches | RV | RV | RV | RV | RV | RV | | | | | | RV | RV | RV | RV | RV |
| CFP | Not released | | | | | | | | | | | | | | | Not released |

== Preseason ==
=== Departures ===
These players graduated at the conclusion of the 2021–22 academic year and as such left the team following the previous season.

| Name | Position | Height (ft. & in.) | Weight (lb.) |
|---|---|---|---|
| Tre Bugg III | DB | 6'0" | 180 |
| Jordan Jackson | DT | 6'4" | 285 |
| Dalton King | TE | 6'3" | 215 |
| Brandon Lewis | WR | 5'9" | 175 |
| Demonte Meeks | ILB | 6'1" | 240 |
| Ben Mercer | C | 6'0" | 280 |
| Corvan Taylor | DB | 6'2" | 205 |
| Hawk Wimmer | OL | 6'4" | 330 |

=== NFL draft ===
One player from the team was selected in the 2022 NFL draft prior to this season.

| Name | Position | Selected by | Round | Pick |
|---|---|---|---|---|
| Jordan Jackson | DT | New Orleans Saints | 6 | 194 |

== Game summaries ==
=== Northern Iowa ===
Air Force Falcons (0–0) vs. No. 21 (FCS) Northern Iowa Panthers (0–0)

| Quarter | 1 | 2 | 3 | 4 | Total |
|---|---|---|---|---|---|
| No. 21 (FCS) Panthers | 3 | 0 | 0 | 14 | 17 |
| Falcons | 14 | 13 | 14 | 7 | 48 |

at Falcon Stadium, Colorado Springs, CO

- Date: September 3, 2022
- Game time: 11:00 a.m. MDT
- Game weather: Sunny
- Game attendance: 31,180
- Referee: David Alvarez
- TV: Altitude
- ESPN – Air Force rushes for 582 yards, 5 TDs in 48-17 win over UNI /// Goairforcefalcons.com – UNI (0-1, 0-0) -VS- Air Force (1-0, 0-0)

Game information

First quarter

- (09:28) AF TD – Haaziq Daniels 80-yard pass to Dane Kinamon, Matthew Dapore kick
  Drive: 5 plays, 93 yards, 2:50; Air Force 7–0
- (04:46) UNI FG – Matthew Cook 28-yard field goal
  Drive: 10 plays, 64 yards, 4:42; Air Force 7–3
- (03:59) AF TD – Dane Kinamon 71-yard rush, Matthew Dapore kick
  Drive: 2 plays, 75 yards, 0:47; Air Force 14–3

Second quarter

- (09:31) AF FG – Matthew Dapore 30-yard field goal
  Drive: 13 plays, 85 yards, 6:53; Air Force 17–3
- (05:47) AF FG – Matthew Dapore 33-yard field goal
  Drive: 5 plays, 28 yards, 2:35; Air Force 20–3
- (00:20) AF TD – Haaziq Daniels 12-yard rush, Matthew Dapore kick
  Drive: 13 plays, 96 yards, 3:11; Air Force 27–3

Third quarter

- (14:10) AF TD – Brad Roberts 71-yard rush, Matthew Dapore kick
  Drive: 2 plays, 75 yards, 0:50; Air Force 34–3
- (00:02) AF TD – Jensen Jones 1-yard rush, Matthew Dapore kick
  Drive: 17 plays, 96 yards, 10:58; Air Force 41–3

Fourth quarter

- (11:13) AF TD – Jalen Johnson 80-yard rush, Anthony Rodriguez kick
  Drive: 2 plays, 80 yards, 0:51; Air Force 48–3
- (08:45) UNI TD – Theo Day 10-yard pass to Logan Wolf, Matthew Cook kick
  Drive: 5 plays, 75 yards, 2:28; Air Force 48–10
- (06:54) UNI TD – Theo Day 14-yard pass to Sergio Morancy, Matthew Cook kick
  Drive: 3 plays, 40 yards, 1:07; Air Force 48–17

Passing

- UNI – Theo Day: 20/32, 286, 2 TD, 1 INT
- AF – Haaziq Daniels: 3/6, 109 yards, 1 TD

Rushing

- UNI – Dom Williams: 11 carries, 45 yards
- AF – Brad Roberts: 8 carries, 114 yards, 1 TD

Receiving

- UNI – Deion McShane: 5 receptions, 66 yards
- AF – Dane Kinamon: 1 reception, 80 yards, 1 TD

Defense

- UNI – Korby Sander: 11 total tackles (6 solo, 5 assisted)
- AF – Trey Taylor: 8 total tackles (6 solo, 2 assisted), 1 pass break-up

| Statistics | UNI | AF |
|---|---|---|
| First downs | 21 | 23 |
| 3rd down efficiency | 2–8 | 7–11 |
| 4th down efficiency | 0–0 | 0–0 |
| Plays–yards | 56–405 | 68–691 |
| Rushes–yards | 24–119 | 62–582 |
| Passing yards | 286 | 109 |
| Passing: Comp–Att–Int | 20–32–1 | 3–6–0 |
| Penalties–yards | 2–15 | 5–21 |
| Turnovers | 2 | 2 |
| Time of possession | 24:58 | 35:02 |

=== Colorado ===
Air Force Falcons (1–0) vs. Colorado Buffaloes (0–1)

| Quarter | 1 | 2 | 3 | 4 | Total |
|---|---|---|---|---|---|
| Buffaloes | 0 | 10 | 0 | 0 | 10 |
| Falcons | 13 | 7 | 7 | 14 | 41 |

at Falcon Stadium, Colorado Springs, CO

- Date: September 10, 2022
- Game time: 1:30 p.m. MDT
- Game weather: Cloudy
- Game attendance: 33,647
- Referee: Mike McCabe
- TV: CBS
- ESPN – FB Roberts scores 3 TDs, Air Force routs Colorado 41-10 /// Goairforcefalcons.com – Colorado (0-2, 0-0) -VS- Air Force (2-0, 0-0)

Game information

First quarter

- (14:27) AF TD – Brad Roberts 14-yard rush, Matthew Dapore kick
  Drive: 1 plays, 14 yards, 0:04; Air Force 7–0
- (09:42) AF FG – Matthew Dapore 54-yard field goal
  Drive: 7 plays, 29 yards, 3:49; Air Force 10–0
- (00:17) AF FG – Matthew Dapore 47-yard field goal
  Drive: 7 plays, 33 yards, 3:04; Air Force 13–0

Second quarter

- (12:55) AF TD – Brad Roberts 20-yard rush, Matthew Dapore kick
  Drive: 4 plays, 35 yards, 1:55; Air Force 20–0
- (10:55) CU TD – Deion Smith 25-yard rush, Cole Becker kick
  Drive: 4 plays, 71 yards, 1:53; Air Force 20–7
- (00:41) CU FG – Cole Becker 41-yard field goal
  Drive: 4 plays, 0 yards, 1:15; Air Force 20–10

Third quarter

- (02:31) AF TD – Haaziq Daniels 1-yard rush, Anthony Rodriguez kick
  Drive: 9 plays, 69 yards, 4:34; Air Force 27–10

Fourth quarter

- (11:12) AF TD – Brad Roberts 46-yard rush, Anthony Rodriguez kick
  Drive: 1 plays, 46 yards, 0:12; Air Force 34–10
- (08:45) AF TD – John Lee Eldridge III 11-yard rush, Anthony Rodriguez kick
  Drive: 12 plays, 68 yards, 7:03; Air Force 41–10

Passing

- CU – J.T. Shrout: 5/21, 51 yards, 1 INT
- AF – Haaziq Daniels: 1/5, 8 yards

Rushing

- CU – Deion Smith: 11 carries, 59 yards, 1 TD
- AF – Brad Roberts: 24 carries, 174 yards, 3 TD

Receiving

- CU – Daniel Arias: 2 receptions, 36 yards
- AF – Dane Kinamon: 1 reception, 8 yards

Defense

- CU – Quinn Perry: 17 total tackles (9 solo, 8 assisted), 1 tackle for loss
- AF – Michael Mack II: 6 total tackles (3 solo, 3 assisted), 1 pass break-up

| Statistics | CU | AF |
|---|---|---|
| First downs | 8 | 25 |
| 3rd down efficiency | 1–11 | 4–12 |
| 4th down efficiency | 0–2 | 1–2 |
| Plays–yards | 53–162 | 75–443 |
| Rushes–yards | 32–111 | 70–435 |
| Passing yards | 51 | 8 |
| Passing: Comp–Att–Int | 5–21–1 | 1–5–0 |
| Penalties–yards | 4–40 | 3–25 |
| Turnovers | 3 | 3 |
| Time of possession | 21:38 | 38:22 |

=== At Wyoming ===
Air Force Falcons (2–0) at Wyoming Cowboys (2–1)

| Quarter | 1 | 2 | 3 | 4 | Total |
|---|---|---|---|---|---|
| Falcons | 0 | 0 | 7 | 7 | 14 |
| Cowboys | 3 | 7 | 0 | 7 | 17 |

at War Memorial Stadium, Laramie, WY

- Date: September 16, 2022
- Game time: 6:00 p.m. MDT
- Game weather: Cloudy
- Game attendance: 18,277
- Referee: Michael Vandervelde
- TV: CBSSN
- ESPN – Swen's late TD run pushes Wyoming over Air Force 17-14 /// Goairforcefalcons.com – Air Force (2-1, 0-1) -VS- Wyoming (3-1, 1-0)

Game information

First quarter

- (07:28) WYO FG – John Hoyland 20-yard field goal
  Drive: 15 plays, 73 yards, 7:32; Wyoming 7–0

Second quarter

- (07:21) WYO TD – Andrew Peasley 14-yard pass to Treyton Welch, John Hoyland kick
  Drive: 3 plays, 42 yards, 1:23; Wyoming 10–0

Third quarter

- (07:45) AF TD – Haaziq Daniels 9-yard pass to David Cormier, Matthew Dapore kick
  Drive: 13 plays, 75 yards, 7:15; Wyoming 10–7

Fourth quarter

- (09:58) AF TD – Haaziq Daniels 41-yard pass to Cade Harris, Matthew Dapore kick
  Drive: 8 plays, 80 yards, 3:55; Air Force 14–10
- (06:06) WYO TD – Titus Swen 5-yard rush, John Hoyland kick
  Drive: 8 plays, 75 yards, 3:52; Wyoming 17–14

Passing

- AF – Haaziq Daniels: 7/14, 101 yards, 2 TD
- WYO – Andrew Peasley: 18/23, 162 yards, 1 TD, 1 INT

Rushing

- AF – John Lee Eldridge III: 13 carries, 104 yards
- WYO – Titus Swen: 19 carries, 102 yards, 1 TD

Receiving

- AF – Cade Harris: 2 receptions, 45 yards, 1 TD
- WYO – Joshua Cobbs: 6 receptions, 45 yards

Defense

- AF – Michael Mack II: 8 total tackles (7 solo, 1 assisted)
- WYO – Cole Godbout: 9 total tackles (4 solo, 5 assisted), 1 tackle for loss

| Statistics | AF | WYO |
|---|---|---|
| First downs | 14 | 18 |
| 3rd down efficiency | 6–13 | 6–11 |
| 4th down efficiency | 1–1 | 0–0 |
| Plays–yards | 54–272 | 58–342 |
| Rushes–yards | 40–171 | 35–180 |
| Passing yards | 101 | 162 |
| Passing: Comp–Att–Int | 7–14–0 | 18–23–1 |
| Penalties–yards | 0–0 | 3–20 |
| Turnovers | 0 | 1 |
| Time of possession | 29:26 | 30:34 |

=== Nevada ===
Air Force Falcons (2–1) vs. Nevada Wolf Pack (2–2)

| Quarter | 1 | 2 | 3 | 4 | Total |
|---|---|---|---|---|---|
| Wolf Pack | 0 | 7 | 0 | 13 | 20 |
| Falcons | 10 | 14 | 17 | 7 | 48 |

at Falcon Stadium, Colorado Springs, CO

- Date: September 23, 2022
- Game time: 6:00 p.m. MDT
- Game weather: Sunny
- Game attendance: 20,506
- Referee: Tuta Salaam
- TV: FS1
- ESPN – Roberts, Brittain spark Air Force in 48-20 win over Nevada /// Goairforcefalcons.com – Nevada (2-3, 0-1) -VS- Air Force (3-1, 1-1)

Game information

First quarter

- (04:36) AF FG – Matthew Dapore 41-yard field goal
  Drive: 17 plays, 48 yards, 9:02; Air Force 3–0
- (02:11) AF TD – Ben Brittain 80-yard pass to David Cormier, Matthew Dapore kick
  Drive: 1 plays, 80 yards, 0:10; Air Force 10–0

Second quarter

- (12:16) NEV TD – Nate Cox 10-yard rush, Matthew Killam kick
  Drive: 10 plays, 75 yards, 4:55; Air Force 10–7
- (09:17) AF TD – Brad Roberts 27-yard rush, Matthew Dapore kick
  Drive: 7 plays, 75 yards, 2:59; Air Force 17–7
- (00:47) AF TD – Brad Roberts 1-yard rush, Matthew Dapore kick
  Drive: 14 plays, 77 yards, 7:08; Air Force 24–7

Third quarter

- (11:54) AF TD – Brad Roberts 9-yard rush, Matthew Dapore kick
  Drive: 6 plays, 70 yards, 3:06; Air Force 31–7
- (05:44) AF FG – Matthew Dapore 51-yard field goal
  Drive: 9 plays, 25 yards, 4:52; Air Force 34–7
- (00:25) AF TD – Emmanuel Michel 26-yard rush, Anthony Rodriguez kick
  Drive: 6 plays, 65 yards, 3:45; Air Force 41–7

Fourth quarter

- (13:17) NEV TD – Toa Taua 40-yard rush, Matthew Killam kick
  Drive: 5 plays, 75 yards, 2:08; Air Force 41–14
- (03:35) AF TD – Aiden Calvert 6-yard rush, Anthony Rodriguez kick
  Drive: 15 plays, 75 yards, 9:42; Air Force 48–14
- (02:52) NEV TD – Toa Taua 6-yard rush, Matthew Killam PAT failed
  Drive: 2 plays, 64 yards, 0:33; Air Force 48–20

Passing

- NEV – Nate Cox: 12/20, 130
- AF – Ben Brittain: 1/1, 80 yards, 1 TD

Rushing

- NEV – Toa Taua: 7 carries, 73 yards, 2 TD
- AF – Brad Roberts: 20 carries, 123 yards, 3 TD

Receiving

- NEV – Jamaal Bell: 3 receptions, 65 yards
- AF – David Cormier: 1 reception, 80 yards, 1 TD

Defense

- NEV – Drue Watts: 11 total tackles (7 solo, 4 assisted), 1 tackle for loss
- AF – Alec Mock: 8 total tackles (5 solo, 3 assisted), 0.5 tackle for loss

| Statistics | NEV | AF |
|---|---|---|
| First downs | 11 | 30 |
| 3rd down efficiency | 4–9 | 10–15 |
| 4th down efficiency | 0–0 | 3–3 |
| Plays–yards | 38–242 | 78–541 |
| Rushes–yards | 18–112 | 75–461 |
| Passing yards | 130 | 80 |
| Passing: Comp–Att–Int | 12–20–0 | 1–3–0 |
| Penalties–yards | 4–30 | 5–50 |
| Turnovers | 0 | 0 |
| Time of possession | 16:19 | 43:41 |

=== Navy ===
Navy Midshipmen (1–2) vs. Air Force Falcons (3–1)

| Quarter | 1 | 2 | 3 | 4 | Total |
|---|---|---|---|---|---|
| Midshipmen | 0 | 3 | 0 | 7 | 10 |
| Falcons | 10 | 0 | 0 | 3 | 13 |

at Falcon Stadium, Colorado Springs, CO

- Date: October 1, 2022
- Game time: 10:00 a.m. MDT
- Game weather: Sunny
- Game attendance: 36,947
- Referee: Nate Black
- TV: CBS
- ESPN – Air Force finds struggling run game late, beats Navy 13-10 /// Goairforcefalcons.com – Navy (1-3, 1-1) -VS- Air Force (4-1, 1-1)

Game information

First quarter

- (13:36) AF TD – Haaziq Daniels 67-yard pass to David Cormier, Matthew Dapore kick
  Drive: 3 plays, 75 yards, 1:24; Air Force 7–0
- (04:17) AF FG – Matthew Dapore 23-yard field goal
  Drive: 9 plays, 52 yards, 5:25; Air Force 10–0

Second quarter

- (00:00) NAVY FG – Daniel Davies 37-yard field goal
  Drive: 4 plays, 11 yards, 0:34; Air Force 10–3

Third quarter

- No Scoring

Fourth quarter

- (10:50) NAVY TD – Tai Lavatai 5-yard rush, Daniel Davies kick
  Drive: 10 plays, 59 yards, 4:20; Tied 10–10
- (04:14) AF FG – Matthew Dapore 22-yard field goal
  Drive: 12 plays, 71 yards, 6:36; Air Force 13–10

Passing

- NAVY – Tai Lavatai: 11/20, 129 yards
- AF – Haaziq Daniels: 6/8, 156 yards, 1 TD

Rushing

- NAVY – Tai Lavatai: 12 carries, 34 yards, 1 TD
- AF – Brad Roberts: 23 carries, 108 yards

Receiving

- NAVY – Jayden Umbarger: 4 receptions, 71 yards
- AF – David Cormier: 3 receptions, 120 yards, 1 TD

Defense

- NAVY – Rayuan Lane III: 9 total tackles (7 solo, 2 assisted)
- AF – Alec Mock: 13 total tackles (2 solo, 11 assisted), 1.5 tackle for loss

| Statistics | NAVY | AF |
|---|---|---|
| First downs | 13 | 16 |
| 3rd down efficiency | 4–13 | 3–11 |
| 4th down efficiency | 0–1 | 0–0 |
| Plays–yards | 56–243 | 55–356 |
| Rushes–yards | 36–114 | 47–200 |
| Passing yards | 129 | 156 |
| Passing: Comp–Att–Int | 11–20–0 | 6–8–0 |
| Penalties–yards | 5–38 | 5–45 |
| Turnovers | 0 | 2 |
| Time of possession | 27:41 | 32:19 |

=== Boise State ===
Navy Midshipmen (4–2) vs. Air Force Falcons (5–2)

| Quarter | 1 | 2 | 3 | 4 | Total |
|---|---|---|---|---|---|
| Broncos | 10 | 9 | 0 | 0 | 19 |
| Falcons | 0 | 7 | 0 | 7 | 14 |

at Falcon Stadium, Colorado Springs, CO

- Date: October 22, 2022
- Game time: 5:00 p.m. MDT
- Game weather: Sunny
- Game attendance: 25,254
- Referee: Christian Watson
- TV: CBSSN
- ESPN – Jeanty, Dalmas help Boise St. hold off Air Force, 19-14 /// Goairforcefalcons.com – Boise St. (5-2, 4-0) -VS- Air Force (5-3, 2-3)

Game information

First quarter

- (05:14) BSU TD – Ashton Jeanty 1-yard rush, Jonah Dalmas kick
  Drive: 13 plays, 63 yards, 6:16; Boise State 7–0
- (02:38) BSU FG – Jonah Dalmas 42-yard field goal
  Drive: 4 plays, 2 yards, 1:11; Boise State 10–0

Second quarter

- (13:26) BSU FG – Jonah Dalmas 29-yard field goal
  Drive: 7 plays, 57 yards, 2:36; Boise State 13–0
- (09:40) BSU FG – Jonah Dalmas 51-yard field goal
  Drive: 5 plays, 30 yards, 1:30; Boise State 16–0
- (06:18) AF TD – Haaziq Daniels 15-yard rush, Matthew Dapore kick
  Drive: 7 plays, 75 yards, 3:22; Boise State 16–7
- (01:49) BSU FG – Jonah Dalmas 39-yard field goal
  Drive: 11 plays, 53 yards, 4:29; Boise State 19–7

Third quarter

- No Scoring

Fourth quarter

- (09:15) AF TD – Brad Roberts 3-yard rush, Matthew Dapore kick
  Drive: 11 plays, 82 yards, 5:38; Boise State 19–14

Passing

- BSU – Taylen Green: 16/24, 227 yards, 1 INT
- AF – Haaziq Daniels: 4/8, 96 yards

Rushing

- BSU – Ashton Jeanty: 15 carries, 53 yards, 1 TD
- AF – Brad Roberts: 25 carries, 90 yards, 1 TD

Receiving

- BSU – Eric McAlister: 1 reception, 44 yards
- AF – Zac Larrier: 1 reception, 37 yards

Defense

- BSU – Ezekiel Noa: 7 total tackles (4 solo, 3 assisted), 1 pass break-up
- AF – Jayden Goodwin: 9 total tackles (5 solo, 5 assisted)

| Statistics | BSU | AF |
|---|---|---|
| First downs | 17 | 14 |
| 3rd down efficiency | 5–13 | 6–14 |
| 4th down efficiency | 1–1 | 0–1 |
| Plays–yards | 64–342 | 59–271 |
| Rushes–yards | 40–115 | 50–175 |
| Passing yards | 227 | 96 |
| Passing: Comp–Att–Int | 16–24–1 | 4–9–0 |
| Penalties–yards | 9–70 | 4–22 |
| Turnovers | 1 | 1 |
| Time of possession | 33:05 | 26:55 |

=== Vs. Army ===
Air Force Falcons (5–3) vs. Army Black Knights (3–4)

| Quarter | 1 | 2 | 3 | 4 | Total |
|---|---|---|---|---|---|
| Falcons | 3 | 0 | 7 | 3 | 13 |
| Black Knights | 0 | 7 | 0 | 0 | 7 |

at Globe Life Field, Arlington, TX

- Date: November 5, 2022
- Game time: 10:30 a.m. CDT
- Game weather: Sunny
- Game attendance: 33,912
- Referee: Timothy Hedgepeth
- TV announcers (CBS): Rich Waltz (Play-by-play), Aaron Taylor (Analyst) & Sherree Burruss (Sideline)
- ESPN – Air Force secures 1st Commander-in-Chief's trophy since 2016 /// Box Score, Air Force vs. Army /// Army Pregame Notes /// Air Force Pregame Notes /// Postgame Notes

Game information

First quarter

- (00:19) AF FG – Matthew Dapore 35-yard field goal
  Drive: 6 plays, 19 yards, 3:06; Air Force 3–0

Second quarter

- (06:24) ARMY TD – Jemel Jones 3-yard rush, Quinn Maretzki kick
  Drive: 6 plays, 68 yards, 3:31; Army 7–3

Third quarter

- (09:32) AF TD – Haaziq Daniels 17-yard rush, Matthew Dapore kick
  Drive: 9 plays, 65 yards, 3:48; Air Force 10–7

Fourth quarter

- (12:06) AF FG – Matthew Dapore 26-yard field goal
  Drive: 16 plays, 58 yards, 8:48; Air Force 13–7

Passing

- AF – Haaziq Daniels: 6/13, 98 yards, 1 INT
- ARMY – Jemel Jones: 4/14, 67 yards, 1 INT

Rushing

- AF – Brad Roberts: 33 carries, 135 yards
- ARMY – Jemel Jones: 21 carries, 37 yards, 1 TD

Receiving

- AF – David Cormier: 4 receptions, 89 yards
- ARMY – Isaiah Alston: 2 receptions, 34 yards

Defense

- AF – Michael Mack II: 6 total tackles (4 solo, 2 assisted), 1 pass break-up
- ARMY – Marquel Broughton: 10 total tackles (8 solo, 2 assisted), 1 tackle for loss, 1 interception

| Statistics | AF | ARMY |
|---|---|---|
| First downs | 18 | 8 |
| 3rd down efficiency | 6–14 | 4–14 |
| 4th down efficiency | 0–0 | 1–3 |
| Plays–yards | 66–324 | 49–145 |
| Rushes–yards | 53–226 | 35–78 |
| Passing yards | 98 | 67 |
| Passing: Comp–Att–Int | 6–13–1 | 4–14–1 |
| Penalties–yards | 5–40 | 4–20 |
| Turnovers | 1 | 1 |
| Time of possession | 34:49 | 25:11 |

=== New Mexico ===
Air Force Falcons (6–3) vs. New Mexico Lobos (2–7)

| Quarter | 1 | 2 | 3 | 4 | Total |
|---|---|---|---|---|---|
| Lobos | 0 | 0 | 3 | 0 | 3 |
| Falcons | 14 | 0 | 14 | 7 | 35 |

at Falcon Stadium, Colorado Springs, CO

- Date: November 12, 2022
- Game time: 1:30 p.m. MDT
- Game weather: Sunny
- Game attendance: 20,827
- Referee: Mikeg Cuttone
- TV: CBSSN
- ESPN – Roberts, Daniels lead way as Air Force runs over New Mexico /// Goairforcefalcons.com – New Mexico (2-8, 0-6) -VS- Air Force (7-3, 3-3)

Game information

First quarter

- (11:36) AF TD – Haaziq Daniels 65-yard rush, Matthew Dapore kick
  Drive: 3 plays, 71 yards, 1:21; Air Force 7–0
- (01:47) AF TD – John Lee Eldridge III 10-yard rush, Matthew Dapore kick
  Drive: 15 plays, 84 yards, 7:40; Air Force 14–0

Second quarter

- No Scoring

Third quarter

- (10:30) AF TD – Haaziq Daniels 33-yard pass to David Cormier, Matthew Dapore kick
  Drive: 10 plays, 75 yards, 4:30; Air Force 21–0
- (05:12) UNM FG – Luke Drzewiecki 39-yard field goal
  Drive: 5 plays, 25 yards, 2:08; Air Force 21–3
- (00:30) AF TD – Haaziq Daniels 37-yard rush, Matthew Dapore kick
  Drive: 9 plays, 78 yards, 4:42; Air Force 28–3

Fourth quarter

- (11:12) AF TD – Jensen Jones 9-yard rush, Anthony Rodriguez kick
  Drive: 9 plays, 46 yards, 5:11; Air Force 35–3

Passing

- UNM – Justin Holaday: 10/21, 128 yards
- AF – Haaziq Daniels: 2/2, 42 yards, 1 TD

Rushing

- UNM – Christian Washington: 7 carries, 24 yards
- AF – Brad Roberts: 29 carries, 163 yards

Receiving

- UNM – Duece Jones: 3 receptions, 49 yards
- AF – David Cormier: 1 reception, 33 yards, 1 TD

Defense

- UNM – Cody Moon: 14 total tackles (5 solo, 9 assisted)
- AF – Jayden Goodwin: 6 total tackles (3 solo, 3 assisted), 1.5 tackle for loss

| Statistics | UNM | AF |
|---|---|---|
| First downs | 8 | 23 |
| 3rd down efficiency | 4–13 | 7–15 |
| 4th down efficiency | 0–2 | 4–4 |
| Plays–yards | 46–172 | 72–463 |
| Rushes–yards | 25–44 | 70–421 |
| Passing yards | 128 | 42 |
| Passing: Comp–Att–Int | 10–21–0 | 2–2–0 |
| Penalties–yards | 4–27 | 6–40 |
| Turnovers | 0 | 1 |
| Time of possession | 22:11 | 37:49 |

=== Colorado State ===
Air Force Falcons (7–3) vs. Colorado State Rams (2–8)

| Quarter | 1 | 2 | 3 | 4 | Total |
|---|---|---|---|---|---|
| Rams | 0 | 0 | 6 | 6 | 12 |
| Falcons | 7 | 10 | 7 | 0 | 24 |

at Falcon Stadium, Colorado Springs, CO

- Date: November 19, 2022
- Game time: 7:00 p.m. MDT
- Game weather: Sunny
- Game attendance: 20,121
- Referee: Tuta Salaam
- TV: FS2
- ESPN – Roberts, Air Force run past Colorado State 24-12 /// Goairforcefalcons.com – Colorado St. (2-9, 2-5) -VS- Air Force (8-3, 4-3)

Game information

First quarter

- (02:35) AF TD – DeAndre Hughes 11-yard rush, Matthew Dapore kick
  Drive: 15 plays, 80 yards, 9:24; Air Force 7–0

Second quarter

- (02:36) AF TD – Brad Roberts 34-yard rush, Matthew Dapore kick
  Drive: 9 plays, 69 yards, 4:04; Air Force 14–0
- (00:00) AF FG – Matthew Dapore 44-yard field goal
  Drive: 5 plays, 43 yards, 0:26; Air Force 17–0

Third quarter

- (04:03) AF TD – John Lee Eldridge III 4-yard rush, Matthew Dapore kick
  Drive: 12 plays, 72 yards, 5:34; Air Force 24–0
- (00:37) CSU TD – Clay Millen 28-yard pass to Tory Horton, 2-pt conversion failed
  Drive: 2 plays, 22 yards, 0:46; Air Force 24–6

Fourth quarter

- (05:17) CSU TD – Clay Millen 21-yard pass to Jordan Williams, 2-pt conversion failed
  Drive: 9 plays, 64 yards, 4:10; Air Force 24–12

Passing

- CSU – Clay Millen: 19/24, 179, 2 TD
- AF – Haaziq Daniels: 0/2, 0 yards

Rushing

- CSU – Avery Morrow: 8 carries, 42 yards
- AF – Brad Roberts: 37 carries, 184 yards, 1 TD

Receiving

- CSU – Jaylen Thomas: 6 receptions, 49 yards
- AF – No Air Force receiving

Defense

- CSU – Dequan Jackson: 11 total tackles (7 solo, 4 assisted)
- AF – TD Blackmon: 8 total tackles (4 solo, 4 assisted)

| Statistics | CSU | AF |
|---|---|---|
| First downs | 15 | 22 |
| 3rd down efficiency | 2–9 | 7–16 |
| 4th down efficiency | 1–3 | 4–5 |
| Plays–yards | 46–244 | 73–359 |
| Rushes–yards | 22–65 | 71–359 |
| Passing yards | 179 | 0 |
| Passing: Comp–Att–Int | 19–24–0 | 0–2–0 |
| Penalties–yards | 3–15 | 4–25 |
| Turnovers | 0 | 1 |
| Time of possession | 22:31 | 37:29 |

=== At San Diego State ===
Air Force Falcons (8–3) at San Diego State Aztecs (7–4)

| Quarter | 1 | 2 | 3 | 4 | Total |
|---|---|---|---|---|---|
| Falcons | 7 | 0 | 3 | 3 | 13 |
| Cowboys | 0 | 0 | 3 | 0 | 3 |

at Snapdragon Stadium, San Diego, CA

- Date: November 26, 2022
- Game time: 6:00 p.m. PT
- Game weather: Sunny
- Game attendance: 25,223
- Referee: Steve Baron
- TV: CBSSN
- ESPN – SRoberts has 187 yards; Air Force beats San Diego St. 13-3 /// Goairforcefalcons.com – Air Force (9-3, 5-3) -VS- San Diego State (7-5, 5-3)

Game information

First quarter

- (12:27) AF TD – Brad Roberts 2-yard rush, Matthew Dapore kick
  Drive: 5 plays, 75 yards, 2:33; Air Force 7–0

Second quarter

- No Scoring

Third quarter

- (12:04) AF FG – Matthew Dapore 30-yard field goal
  Drive: 4 plays, 1 yards, 2:06; Air Force 10–0
- (09:12) SDSU FG – Jack Browning 26-yard field goal
  Drive: 6 plays, 31 yards, 2:44; Air Force 10–3

Fourth quarter

- (09:03) AF FG – Matthew Dapore 32-yard field goal
  Drive: 11 plays, 54 yards, 6:40; Air Force 13–3

Passing

- AF – Haaziq Daniels: 1/2, 14 yards
- SDSU – Jalen Mayden: 16/31, 188 yards, 2 INT

Rushing

- AF – Brad Roberts: 35 carries, 187 yards, 1 TD
- SDSU – Jordan Byrd: 6 carries, 13 yards

Receiving

- AF – David Cormier: 1 reception, 14 yards
- SDSU – Brionne Penny: 3 receptions, 63 yards

Defense

- AF – Jayden Goodwin: 7 total tackles (3 solo, 4 assisted), 1 pass break-up
- SDSU – Michael Shawcroft: 12 total tackles (9 solo, 3 assisted), 1 sack, 2 tackle for loss

| Statistics | AF | SDSU |
|---|---|---|
| First downs | 14 | 8 |
| 3rd down efficiency | 4–17 | 0–10 |
| 4th down efficiency | 1–2 | 1–1 |
| Plays–yards | 69–285 | 46–187 |
| Rushes–yards | 66–271 | 15– -1 |
| Passing yards | 14 | 188 |
| Passing: Comp–Att–Int | 1–3–0 | 16–31–1 |
| Penalties–yards | 4–30 | 8–49 |
| Turnovers | 0 | 3 |
| Time of possession | 39:13 | 20:47 |

=== Vs. Baylor (Armed Forces Bowl) ===
Air Force Falcons (9–3) vs. Baylor Bears (6–6)

| Quarter | 1 | 2 | 3 | 4 | Total |
|---|---|---|---|---|---|
| Baylor | 0 | 7 | 0 | 8 | 15 |
| Falcons | 9 | 0 | 14 | 7 | 30 |

at Amon G. Carter Stadium, Fort Worth, TX

- Date: December 22, 2022
- Game time: 6:30 p.m. CDT
- Game weather: Temperature: 13 °F (−11 °C) • Wind: N at 20 miles per hour (32 km/h) • Weather: Clear
- Game attendance: N/A
- Referee: Jeremy Valentine
- TV announcers (ESPN): Brian Custer (Play-by-play), Dustin Fox (Analyst), & Lauren Sisler (Sideline)
- ESPN – Air Force beats Baylor 30-15 in chilly Armed Forces Bowl /// Goairforcefalcons.com – Baylor (6-7, 4-5) -VS- Air Force (10-3, 5-3) /// 9News – Air Force tops Baylor Bears in sub-zero Armed Forces Bowl /// Baylor Lariat – Frozen in time: 2022 Armed Forces Bowl one of coldest bowl games ever

Game information

First quarter

- (5:20) AF TD – Brad Roberts 2-yard rush, Matthew Dapore kick blocked
  Drive: 15 plays, 55 yards, 8:44; Air Force 6–0
- (01:13) AF FG – Matthew Dapore 37-yard field goal
  Drive: 5 plays, 38 yards, 2:05; Air Force 9–0

Second quarter

- (00:05) BU TD – Blake Shapen 8-yard pass to Hal Presley, John Mayers kick
  Drive: 6 plays, 47 yards, 1:35; Air Force 9–7

Third quarter

- (12:28) AF TD – Haaziq Daniels 2-yard rush, Matthew Dapore kick
  Drive: 5 plays, 83 yards, 2:32; Air Force 16–7
- (02:29) AF TD– Haaziq Daniels 15-yard pass to Caleb Rillos, Matthew Dapore kick
  Drive: 7 plays, 64 yards, 3:21; Air Force 23–7

Fourth quarter

- (12:40) AF TD – Brad Roberts 1-yard rush, Matthew Dapore kick
  Drive: 7 plays, 42 yards, 3:15; Air Force 30–7
- (03:34) BU TD – Blake Shapen 14-yard pass to Gavin Holmes, Blake Shapen 2-pt rush
  Drive: 4 plays, 85 yards, 0:41; Air Force 30–15

Passing

- BU – Blake Shapen: 11/23, 188 yards, 2 TD
- AF – Haaziq Daniels: 4/7, 103 yards, 1 TD

Rushing

- BU – Craig Williams: 7 carries, 25 yards
- AF – Brad Roberts: 37 carries, 116 yards, 2 TD

Receiving

- BU – Jaylen Ellis: 1 reception, 57 yards
- AF – Amari Terry: 1 reception, 68 yards

Defense

- BU – Matt Jones: 10 total tackles (9 solo, 1 assisted)
- AF – Jayden Goodwin: 9 total tackles (6 solo, 3 assisted), 1 pass break-up

| Statistics | BU | AF |
|---|---|---|
| First downs | 11 | 20 |
| 3rd down efficiency | 0–11 | 8–16 |
| 4th down efficiency | 3–6 | 2–5 |
| Plays–yards | 49–230 | 74–379 |
| Rushes–yards | 28–42 | 67–267 |
| Passing yards | 188 | 103 |
| Passing: Comp–Att–Int | 11–23–0 | 4–7–0 |
| Penalties–yards | 5–27 | 2–20 |
| Turnovers | 0 | 0 |
| Time of possession | 19:57 | 40:03 |

== Personnel ==
=== Coaching staf ===
| Name | Position(s) | Season | College |
|---|---|---|---|
| Marc Bacote | Tight ends coach | 1st | James Madison |
| Jake Campbell | Slot backs coach | 11th | Air Force |
| Troy Calhoun | Head coach | 16th | Air Force |
| Ari Confesor | Wide receivers coach | 4th | Holy Cross |
| Tim Horton | Running backs coach | 2nd | Arkansas |
| Tim Horton | Special teams coordinator | 2nd | Arkansas |
| Charlie Jackson | Assistant head coach | 1st | Air Force |
| Charlie Jackson | Defensive backs coach | 1st | Air Force |
| Brian Knorr | Defensive coordinator | 11th | Air Force |
| Brian Knorr | Inside linebackers coach | 11th | Air Force |
| Ken Lamendola | Outside linebackers coach | 1st | Air Force |
| Steed Lobotzke | Offensive line coach | 8th | Air Force |
| Matt McGettigan | Strength & conditioning coach | 16th | Luther |
| Alex Means | Defensive line coach | 5th | Air Force |
| Brett Skene | Assistant offensive line coach | 2nd | Air Force |
| Brett Skene | Specialists coach | 2nd | Air Force |
| Mike Thiessen | Offensive coordinator | 16th | Air Force |
| Mike Thiessen | Quarterbacks coach | 16th | Air Force |
| Nick Toth | Safeties coach | 1st | Ohio |
| E. J. Whitlow | Defensive ends coach | 1st | Findlay |
