= 2015 Armed Forces Bowl =

2015 Armed Forces Bowl can refer to:

- 2015 Armed Forces Bowl (January), played as part of the 2014–15 college football bowl season between the Houston Cougars and the Pittsburgh Panthers
- 2015 Armed Forces Bowl (December), played as part of the 2015–16 college football bowl season between the Air Force Falcons and the California Golden Bears
