= Troy Calhoun =

American football player and coach (born 1966)

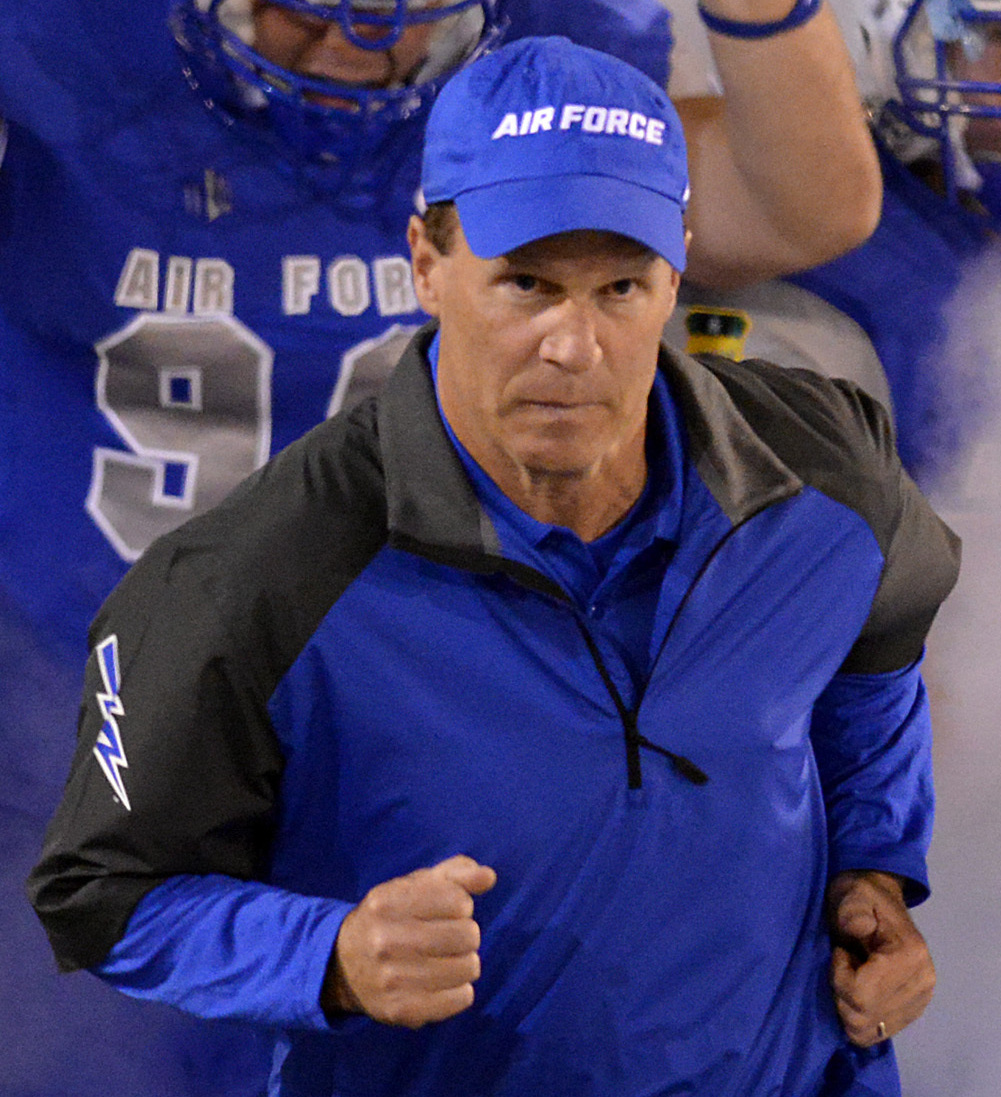
- Calhoun in 2013

Current position
- Title: Head coach
- Team: Air Force
- Conference: MW
- Record: 148–99

Biographical details
- Born: September 26, 1966 (age 60); McMinnville, Oregon, U.S.

Playing career
- 1985–1988: Air Force
- Position: Quarterback

Coaching career (HC unless noted)
- 1989–1990: Air Force (GA)
- 1993–1994: Air Force (RC/JV OC)
- 1995–1996: Ohio (QB)
- 1997–2000: Ohio (OC/QB)
- 2001–2002: Wake Forest (OC/QB)
- 2003–2005: Denver Broncos (assistant)
- 2006: Houston Texans (OC/QB)
- 2007–present: Air Force

Head coaching record
- Overall: 148–99
- Bowls: 8–5

Accomplishments and honors

Championships
- 2 MW Mountain Division (2015, 2021)

Awards
- MW Coach of the Year (2007)

Nathan Troy Calhoun (born September 26, 1966) is an American football coach and former player. He is the head football coach at the United States Air Force Academy, a position he has held since the 2007 season.

== Early life and playing career ==
Calhoun was born in McMinnville, Oregon in 1966, although his family moved to Roseburg, Oregon when Calhoun was just three years old. Calhoun attended Roseburg High School, where he played football under longtime Roseburg coach Thurman Bell. Along with Bell, Calhoun also counts Dayton High coach Dewey Sullivan—a Calhoun family friend—as an early influence.

Calhoun joined the Air Force Academy in 1985, becoming one of just two freshmen to letter on the 1985 Falcons team that finished 12–1.

== Coaching career ==
=== Assistant coaching ===
After graduating from the United States Air Force Academy in 1989, Calhoun served on the Air Force coaching staff under Fisher DeBerry as a graduate assistant during the 1989–90 seasons. After serving out his military commitment, he went on to serve as the Falcons' recruiting coordinator and the junior varsity offensive coordinator over the 1993–94 seasons.

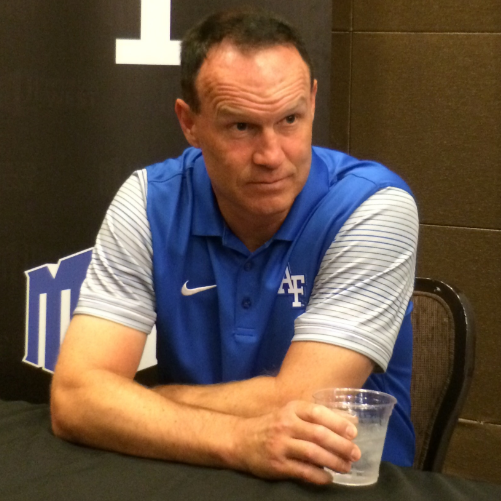
Calhoun at 2016 Mountain West Media Days; his team had won its division the previous season.

In 1995, he moved to Ohio University where he served as the quarterbacks coach for two seasons, and was promoted to offensive coordinator in 1997. During his first season with Ohio, his offense had measurable success, particularly in a game against Eastern Michigan, in which the school totaled 612 yards, second most in school history. The team also captured a win against Maryland in 1997, which was Ohio's first victory over a school from the Atlantic Coast Conference (ACC). The following week, Ohio fell three points short of defeating Kansas State. In Calhoun's final year at Ohio in 2000, the offense set a school record with 418.1 yards per game and rushed for a school-best 3,553. The Bobcats also ended the season with wins over two bowl teams, Minnesota and Marshall.

Calhoun became offensive coordinator and quarterbacks coach of Wake Forest University in 2001. During Calhoun's second season, the Demon Deacons led the ACC in total offense with 408.1 yards per game, with a league-best 990 plays and only 16 turnovers.

Calhoun began his NFL career with the Denver Broncos as a defensive assistant in 2003, and later moved to offense and special teams. When Broncos offensive coordinator Gary Kubiak was hired as the Texans' head coach, Kubiak brought Calhoun along and made Calhoun his offensive coordinator and quarterbacks coach. Calhoun finished out the 2006 season with the Texans before taking over at Air Force.

=== Air Force ===
Calhoun was hired on December 22, 2006, to be the head football coach for Air Force, replacing DeBerry who retired after 23 years as the Falcons' head coach. In his first season as head coach of the Falcons, he took the team to a 9–3 record, and a spot in the Armed Forces Bowl against Cal. On December 4, 2007, Calhoun was named Mountain West Coach of the Year for 2007.

== Head coaching record ==
Year	Team	Overall	Conference	Standing	Bowl/playoffs	Coaches^{#}	AP^{°}
Air Force Falcons (Mountain West Conference) (2007–present)
2007	Air Force	9–4	6–2	2nd	L Armed Forces		
2008	Air Force	8–5	5–3	4th	L Armed Forces		
2009	Air Force	8–5	5–3	4th	W Armed Forces		
2010	Air Force	9–4	5–3	T–3rd	W Independence		
2011	Air Force	7–6	3–4	5th	L Military		
2012	Air Force	6–7	5–3	4th	L Armed Forces		
2013	Air Force	2–10	0–8	6th (Mountain)			
2014	Air Force	10–3	5–3	4th (Mountain)	W Famous Idaho Potato		
2015	Air Force	8–6	6–2	1st (Mountain)	L Armed Forces		
2016	Air Force	10–3	5–3	T–4th (Mountain)	W Arizona		
2017	Air Force	5–7	4–4	T–4th (Mountain)			
2018	Air Force	5–7	3–5	4th (Mountain)			
2019	Air Force	11–2	7–1	2nd (Mountain)	W Cheez-It	23	22
2020	Air Force	3–3	2–2	T–5th			
2021	Air Force	10–3	6–2	T–1st (Mountain)	W First Responder		
2022	Air Force	10–3	5–3	T–2nd (Mountain)	W Armed Forces		
2023	Air Force	9–4	5–3	T–4th	W Armed Forces		
2024	Air Force	5–7	3–4	T–5th			
2025	Air Force	4–8	3–5	8th			
2026	Air Force	9–2	5–2				
Air Force:		148–99	88–62				
Total:		148–99					
National championship Conference title Conference division title or championship game berth
