= Hal Presley =

American football player (born 2003)

Profile
- Position: Wide receiver

Personal information
- Born: January 22, 2003 (age 23); Mansfield, Texas, U.S.
- Listed height: 6 ft 3 in (1.91 m)
- Listed weight: 210 lb (95 kg)

Career information
- High school: Mansfield (TX) Summit
- College: Baylor (2021–2024)
- NFL draft: 2025: undrafted

Career history
- Buffalo Bills (2025)*; Kansas City Chiefs (2025)*; Tennessee Titans (2025)*
- * Offseason or practice squad member only
- Stats at Pro Football Reference

Hal Patrick Presley III (born January 22, 2003) is an American professional football wide receiver. He played college football for the Baylor Bears.

== Early life ==
Presley played high school football as a wide receiver with the Summit Jaguars. He was named Texas District 7-6A first-team in 2019 and recorded over 40 catches both during his junior and senior years. In his senior year, Presley scored 16 touchdowns. While at Summit, Presley lettered in track and field. Presley was rated a three-star recruiting prospect.

== College career ==
Presley committed to Auburn prior to his high school graduation in 2020. He quickly transferred his enrollment to Baylor University and joined the field as a wide receiver with the Bears during the 2021 season. Only playing eight games, Presley's freshman season posted noticeably late statistics, recording only a single carry for 13 yards and a single catch for 15 yards. His sophomore season in 2022 proved more productive, including his promotion to starting wide receiver for 11 of 13 games.

In his sophomore season, Presley placed second on the team with 32 catches, going for 382 yards with four touchdowns. Presley's junior season in 2023 opened positively, starting six games at outside wide receiver before sustaining a season-ending injury. During his senior season in 2024, Presley played in 12 games. He made 10 starts as outside wide receiver. His return earned him College Sports Communicators Comeback Player of the Year.

== Professional career ==
Pre-draft measurables
Height	Weight	Arm length	Hand span	40-yard dash	10-yard split	20-yard split	20-yard shuttle	Three-cone drill	Vertical jump	Broad jump	Bench press
6 ft 1 7/8 in (1.88 m)	201 lb (91 kg)	32 5/8 in (0.83 m)	9 7/8 in (0.25 m)	4.56 s	1.62 s	2.62 s	4.35 s	7.06 s	34.5 in (0.88 m)	10 ft 2 in (3.10 m)	11 reps
All values from Pro Day

=== Buffalo Bills ===
Presley signed with the Buffalo Bills as an undrafted free agent following the 2025 NFL draft. He was subsequently waived from the rookie minicamp.

=== Kansas City Chiefs ===
On July 21, 2025, Presley signed with the Kansas City Chiefs as an undrafted free agent. He was relegated to the practice squad after the finalization of the active roster on August 27, but released the next day. On September 10, Presley was re-signed to the practice squad, but released a week later.

=== Tennessee Titans ===
On October 28, 2025, Presley signed with the Tennessee Titans' practice squad. He signed a reserve/future contract with Tennessee on January 5, 2026. On May 8, Presley was waived by the Titans.

== Personal life ==
Presley is one of three children born to Thamatha and Hal Presley Jr. His two sisters are named Tanji and Shanda.
