= Brian Custer =

American sports broadcaster

- Born: December 7, 1970 (age 54); Columbus, Ohio
- Sports commentary career
- Genre: Play-by-play
- Sports: Boxing; Basketball; Football

Brian Custer (born December 7, 1970) is an American sports broadcaster who served as the host for Showtime Championship Boxing from 2015 to 2023. In July 2021, Custer joined ESPN as the host of SportsCenter and a play-by-play announcer on ESPN College Football, ESPN College Basketball and NBA on ESPN.

He worked for Fox Sports as a play-by-play announcer doing select NFL games as well as the BIG3, NCAA football and NCAA basketball. He was also a sportscaster for SportsNet New York.
