= 2021 Hawaii Rainbow Warriors football team =

American college football season

2021 Hawaii Rainbow Warriors football

Hawaii Bowl vs. Memphis, Canceled
- Conference: Mountain West Conference
- Record: 6–7 (3–5 MW)
- Head coach: Todd Graham (2nd season)
- Offensive coordinator: Bo Graham (1st season)
- Offensive scheme: Run and gun
- Defensive coordinator: Trent Figg (de facto; 1st season)
- Base defense: 4–2–5 hybrid "War Dog"
- Captains: Darius Muasau; Chevan Cordeiro; Khoury Bethley
- Home stadium: Clarence T. C. Ching Athletics Complex

2021 Mountain West Conference football standings
	Conf.			Overall
Team	W		L	W		L
Mountain Division
No. 24 Utah State xy$	6	–	2	11	–	3
Air Force x	6	–	2	10	–	3
Boise State	5	–	3	7	–	5
Wyoming	2	–	6	7	–	6
Colorado State	2	–	6	3	–	9
New Mexico	1	–	7	3	–	9
West Division
No. 25 San Diego State xy	7	–	1	12	–	2
Fresno State	6	–	2	10	–	3
Nevada	5	–	3	8	–	5
Hawaii	3	–	5	6	–	7
San Jose State	3	–	5	5	–	7
UNLV	2	–	6	2	–	10
Championship: Utah State 46, San Diego State 13
$ – Conference champion; x – Division champion/co-champions; y – Championship game participant; Rankings from AP Poll

The 2021 Hawaii Rainbow Warriors football team represented the University of Hawaiʻi at Mānoa in the 2021 NCAA Division I FBS football season. The Rainbow Warriors played their home games on the campus at the Clarence T. C. Ching Athletics Complex as members of the West Division of the Mountain West Conference. They were led by second-year head coach Todd Graham.

Despite losing three straight games en route to finishing the regular season 6–7 overall, the team was invited to play in the Hawaii Bowl as a conditionally eligible team after the NCAA added an extra bowl game to the schedule. The team accepted the bid on December 3, 2021, marking the team's fourth consecutive postseason appearance, a new program record. However, due to a COVID-19 outbreak, season-ending injuries, and transfers, the team was forced to withdraw the day before the game, marking the Hawaii Bowl’s second consecutive cancellation.

On January 14, 2022, Graham announced his resignation as head coach after reports surfaced of player unrest with his coaching style, along with a report that an apparent players-only vote to not play in the Hawaii Bowl had taken place without his knowledge. He finished 11–11 with two bowl appearances in two seasons, winning the New Mexico Bowl in 2020.

== Offseason ==
=== 2021 recruiting class ===
The Rainbow Warriors have signed eight recruits out of high school as of February 3, 2021.

College recruiting (2021)
Name	Hometown	School	Height	Weight	Commit date
Nate Adams; OL	Flower Mound, TX	Flower Mound High School	6 ft 6 in (1.98 m)	320 lb (150 kg)	Jan 8, 2021
Nate Adams; OL	Recruit ratings: Rivals: 247Sports: ESPN: (72)				
Joshua Bertholette; LB	New Orleans, LA	Landry-Walker High School	6 ft 2 in (1.88 m)	210 lb (95 kg)	Aug 5, 2020
Joshua Bertholette; LB	Recruit ratings: Rivals: 247Sports: ESPN: (72)				
Jordan Johnson; RB	Dallas, TX	Allen High School	5 ft 11 in (1.80 m)	175 lb (79 kg)	Jul 14, 2020
Jordan Johnson; RB	Recruit ratings: Rivals: 247Sports: ESPN: (72)				
Tariq Jones; DL	New Orleans, LA	McDonogh 35 High School	6 ft 3 in (1.91 m)	230 lb (100 kg)	Aug 25, 2020
Tariq Jones; DL	Recruit ratings: Rivals: 247Sports: ESPN: (71)				
Ty Marsh; DB	Dallas, TX	Denton Ryan High School	5 ft 10 in (1.78 m)	175 lb (79 kg)	Jan 27, 2021
Ty Marsh; DB	Recruit ratings: Rivals: 247Sports: ESPN: (77)				
Brayden Schager; QB	Dallas, TX	Highland Park High School (TX)	6 ft 3 in (1.91 m)	200 lb (91 kg)	Jul 18, 2020
Brayden Schager; QB	Recruit ratings: Rivals: 247Sports: ESPN: (73)				
Sonny Semeatu; LB	Tfuna, America Samoa	Mililani High School	6 ft 1 in (1.85 m)	240 lb (110 kg)	Jun 22, 2020
Sonny Semeatu; LB	Recruit ratings: Rivals: 247Sports: ESPN: (70)				
Zhen-Keith Sotelo; DL	Waianae, HI	Kapolei High School	6 ft 4 in (1.93 m)	270 lb (120 kg)	Feb 3, 2021
Zhen-Keith Sotelo; DL	Recruit ratings: Rivals: 247Sports: ESPN: (75)				
Matangi Thompson; DB	Honolulu, HI	Punahou School	6 ft 2 in (1.88 m)	180 lb (82 kg)	Feb 3, 2021
Matangi Thompson; DB	Recruit ratings: 247Sports:				
Overall recruit ranking:
Note: In many cases, Scout, Rivals, 247Sports, On3, and ESPN may conflict in their listings of height and weight.; In these cases, the average was taken. ESPN grades are on a 100-point scale.; Sources: "Rivals commits". Rivals.; "ESPN commits". ESPN.; "2021 Team Ranking". Rivals.com.; "247Sports commits". 247Sports.

=== Transfers ===
==== Outgoing ====
Name	No.	Pos.	Height	Weight	Year	Hometown	New school
Bubba Waʻa	67	OL	6 ft 2 in (1.88 m)	295 pounds (134 kg)	(redshirt) Freshman	Hauʻula, Hawaii	Texas State
Zach Bowers	56	LB	6 ft 0 in (1.83 m)	215 pounds (98 kg)	(redshirt) Freshman	Chandler, Arizona	Arizona State
Lincoln Victor	85	WR	5 ft 10 in (1.78 m)	165 pounds (75 kg)	Sophomore	Camas, Washington	Washington State
Miles Reed	4	RB	5 ft 8 in (1.73 m)	190 pounds (86 kg)	(redshirt) Junior	Corona, California	Stephen F. Austin
Mason Vega	43	DL	6 ft 3 in (1.91 m)	275 pounds (125 kg)	Senior	Rancho Cucamonga, California	
Melquise Stovall	3	WR	5 ft 9 in (1.75 m)	190 pounds (86 kg)	(redshirt) Senior	Lancaster, California	Pittsburgh

==== Incoming ====
Name	Pos.	Height	Weight	Year	Hometown	Prev. school
Colby Burton	DB	5 ft 10 in (1.78 m)	180 pounds (82 kg)	Senior	League City, Texas	McNeese State
Solomon Turner	LB	6 ft 1 in (1.85 m)	230 pounds (100 kg)	(redshirt) Freshman	Frisco, Texas	Baylor
Kolby Wyatt	TE	6 ft 4 in (1.93 m)	240 pounds (110 kg)	Junior	San Diego, California	Georgia
Zacchaeus McKinney	DL	6 ft 4 in (1.93 m)	300 pounds (140 kg)	(redshirt) Junior	Weatherford, Texas	Oklahoma
Arnold Azunna	DB	6 ft 0 in (1.83 m)	200 pounds (91 kg)	(redshirt) Senior	Grand Prairie, Texas	Iowa State
Hugh Nelson II	DB	6 ft 2 in (1.88 m)	198 pounds (90 kg)	(redshirt) Sophomore	Powder Springs, Georgia	Georgia
Dedrick Parson	RB	5 ft 9 in (1.75 m)	195 pounds (88 kg)	(redshirt) Junior	Philadelphia, Pennsylvania	Howard
Caleb Phillips	TE	6 ft 5 in (1.96 m)	230 pounds (100 kg)	Senior	San Diego, California	Stanford
Pita Tonga	DL	6 ft 1 in (1.85 m)	310 pounds (140 kg)	Senior	Taylorsville, Utah	Utah
O'Tay Baker	DL	6 ft 4 in (1.93 m)	250 pounds (110 kg)	Junior	Mesquite, Texas	Tyler JC

=== Staff departures ===
Name	Position	New Program	New Position	Notes
Matt Passwaters	Graduate assistant	North Texas	Defensive line coach	
Josh Omura	Director of on-campus recruiting	Washington State	Director of transfer recruiting	
Brennan Marion	Wide receivers coach	Pittsburgh	Wide receivers coach	
G. J. Kinne	Offensive coordinator Quarterbacks coach	UCF	Co-offensive coordinator Quarterbacks coach	
Tony Hull	Co-offensive coordinator Inside receivers coach	Louisiana–Monroe	Wide receivers coach	

In addition to the staff departures, the program moved their chief of staff Trent Figg to an on-field coaching role to help save the university's athletic department $100,000 in wake of the COVID-19 pandemic.

== Preseason ==
=== Award watch lists ===
Listed in the order they were released

Award	Player	Position	Year
Chuck Bednarik Award	Darius Muasau	LB	SO
Doak Walker Award	Calvin Turner	RB	SR
Jim Thorpe Award	Cortez Davis II	CB	SR
Bronko Nagurski Trophy	Darius Muasau	LB	SO
Wuerffel Trophy	Hekili Keliiliki	RB/LB	JR
Paul Hornung Award	Calvin Turner	RB/WR	SR
Fred Biletnikoff Award	Nick Mardner	WR	JR

=== Mountain West media days ===
The Mountain West media days were held from July 21–22 at the Cosmopolitan of Las Vegas in Paradise, Nevada.

==== Media poll ====
The preseason media poll was released at the Mountain West media days on July 21, 2021. The Rainbow Warriors were predicted to finish in fifth place in the West Division.

West
Predicted finish	Team	Votes (1st place)
1	Nevada	141 (19)
2	San Jose State	121 (5)
3	San Diego State	96
4	Fresno State	85 (1)
5	Hawaii	56
6	UNLV	26

Mountain
Predicted finish	Team	Votes (1st place)
1	Boise State	148 (23)
2	Wyoming	115 (2)
3	Air Force	104
4	Colorado State	72
5	Utah State	47
6	New Mexico	39

=== Preseason All-Mountain West Team ===
The Rainbow Warriors had two players selected to the preseason All-Mountain West team.

Defense
Cortez Davis II – CB

Specialists
Calvin Turner – PR

== Schedule ==
The schedule was announced on March 5, 2021.

Date	Time	Opponent	Site	TV	Result	Attendance
August 28	9:30 a.m.	at UCLA*	Rose Bowl; Pasadena, CA	ESPN	L 10–44	32,982
September 4	6:00 p.m.	Portland State*	Clarence T. C. Ching Athletics Complex; Honolulu, HI	SPEC PPV	W 49–35	0
September 11	5:00 p.m.	at Oregon State*	Reser Stadium; Corvallis, OR	FS1	L 27–45	27,701
September 18	6:30 p.m.	San Jose State	Clarence T. C. Ching Athletics Complex; Honolulu, HI (Dick Tomey Legacy Game)	FS1	L 13–17	0
September 25	2:00 p.m.	at New Mexico State*	Aggie Memorial Stadium; Las Cruces, NM	FloSports	W 41–21	13,932
October 2	5:00 p.m.	No. 18 Fresno State^{†}	Clarence T. C. Ching Athletics Complex; Honolulu, HI (rivalry)	CBSSN	W 27–24	0
October 16	4:30 p.m.	at Nevada	Mackay Stadium; Reno, NV	CBSSN	L 17–34	22,098
October 23	6:00 p.m.	New Mexico State*	Clarence T. C. Ching Athletics Complex; Honolulu, HI	SPEC PPV	W 48–34	1,000
October 30	9:00 a.m.	at Utah State	Maverik Stadium; Logan, UT	SPEC PPV	L 31–51	19,219
November 6	5:00 p.m.	No. 24 San Diego State	Clarence T. C. Ching Athletics Complex; Honolulu, HI	FS1	L 10–17	6,239
November 13	11:00 a.m.	at UNLV	Allegiant Stadium; Paradise, NV	SPEC PPV	L 13–27	19,623
November 20	6:00 p.m.	Colorado State	Clarence T. C. Ching Athletics Complex; Honolulu, HI	SPEC PPV	W 50–45	6,575
November 27	10:00 a.m.	at Wyoming	War Memorial Stadium; Laramie, WY (rivalry)	SPEC PPV	W 38–14	14,213
~~December 24~~	~~8:00 p.m.~~	~~Memphis~~*	~~Clarence T. C. Ching Athletics Complex~~; ~~Honolulu, HI~~ (~~Hawaii Bowl~~)	~~ESPN~~	Canceled ^{A}	—
*Non-conference game; ^{†}Homecoming; Rankings from AP Poll (and CFP Rankings, after November 2) - Released prior to game; All times are in Hawaii time

- ^A Hawaii was forced to withdraw due to COVID-19 and other related issues within the team. The game was canceled shortly after.

== Roster ==
2021 Hawaii Rainbow Warriors football team roster
Players
Coaches
Offense

Pos.	#	Name	Class
RB	0	Dae Dae Hunter	Fr
WR	1	Tru Edwards	So
RB	3	James Phillips	So
QB	5	Jake Farrell	Fr
WR	6	Zion Bowens	Jr
RB, WR	7	Calvin Turner	Sr
WR	9	Jonah Panoke	Fr
TE	10	Kolby Wyatt	Jr
RB	11	Jordan Johnson	Fr
QB	12	Chevan Cordeiro (C)	So
QB	13	Brayden Schager	Fr
WR	14	Jalen Walthall	Fr
QB	16	Armani Edden	Jr
QB	17	Justin Uahinui	Jr
QB	19	Kamaliʻi Akina	Sr
QB	20	Connor Apo	Fr
WR	23	Jared Smart	Sr
RB	25	Dior Scott	Jr
RB	26	Kilohana Haasenritter	Fr
WR	27	Koali Nishigaya	Fr
WR	28	Aaron Cephus	Sr
RB, WR	30	Landon Sims	Fr
RB	31	Dedrick Parson	Jr
RB, WR	33	Steven Fiso	So
WR	34	James Green III	So
RB	35	Hekili Keliiliki	Jr
RB	37	David Cordero	Fr
RB	38	Nasjzaé Bryant	So
RB	43	Ronson Young	Jr
OL	51	Maurice Taʻala	Fr
OL	52	Solo Vaipulu	Jr
OL	53	Ramsey Aviu	Jr
OL	61	Eliki Tanuvasa	So
OL	64	Kauka Umiamaka	Fr
OL	66	Sergio Muasau	Fr
OL	68	Ra Elkington	Jr
OL	69	Stephan Bernal-Wendt	Jr
OL	70	Arasi Mose	Fr
OL	71	Micah Vanterpool	Jr
OL	72	Kohl Levao	Sr
OL	73	Nate Adams	Fr
OL	74	Gene Pryor	Sr
OL	75	Ilm Manning	Jr
OL	76	Zhen-Keith Sotelo	Fr
OL	77	Austin Hopp	Jr
OL	78	Kaʻena Decambra	Fr
OL	79	Micah Soliai Howlett	Fr
TE	80	Kamuela Borden	So
WR	81	Grey Ihu	Jr
WR	82	Dayton Toney	Fr
WR	83	Karsyn Pupunu	Fr
WR	84	Nick Mardner	So
TE	85	Caleb Phillips	Sr
WR	88	Tamatoa Mokiao-Atimalala	Fr

Defense

Pos.	#	Name	Class
DB	0	Chima Azunna	Sr
LB	1	Penei Pavihi	Jr
LB	2	Jeremiah Pritchard	Sr
DB	3	Hugh Nelson II	So
DB	4	Ty Marsh	Fr
DB	5	Khoury Bethley (C)	Jr
LB	6	Riley Wilson	Fr
DL	7	Zacchaeus McKinney	Jr
DB	8	Eugene Ford	Sr
DL	9	O'Tay Baker	So
DB, LB	10	Michael Graham	Fr
LB	12	Josh Bertholotte	Fr
DB	13	Jalen Perdue	Jr
DB	14	Von Killins	Fr
LB	15	Solomon Turner	Fr
DB	16	Logan Taylor	Jr
LB	17	Isaiah Tufaga	So
DB	18	Cortez Davis	Sr
DB	19	Quentin Frazier	Sr
DB	20	Cameron Lockridge	So
DB	21	Michael Washington	Fr
DB	22	Colby Burton	Sr
DB	24	Kai Kaneshiro	So
DB	26	Leonard Lee	Jr
DB	27	Asher Pilanca	Fr
DB	28	Nalu Emerson	Fr
DB	29	Donovan Dalton	Jr
DB	31	Tiger Peterson	Fr
DB, RB	36	Solo Turner	Fr
LB	38	Kamalu DeBlake	Fr
DB	39	Kalamaku Kuewa	So
LB	40	D. J. Utu	Fr
DL	42	Jonah Kahahawai-Welch	So
DL	43	Tariq Jones	Fr
LB	45	Payton Awaya	Sr
DB	46	Harvey Welch	Fr
LB	47	Noa Kamana	Jr
DL	48	Derek Thomas	Sr
DL	49	Pita Tonga	Sr
DL	50	Justus Tavai	Jr
LB	51	George Hooker	Jr
DL	52	Ezra Evaimalo	Fr
LB	53	Darius Muasau (C)	So
DL	54	Kalani Kamakawiwoʻole	Fr
DL	55	Blessman Taʻala	Jr
DL	56	Mark Blocker II	Fr
LB	58	Kila Kamakawiwoʻole	Fr
DL	59	Andrew Choi	So
DL	60	Kalani Atwood	Fr
DL	90	John Tuitupou	Sr
DL	91	Gabriel Iniguez Jr.	Fr
DL	92	DJuan Matthews	Sr
DL	93	Mason Mataafa	Jr
DL	94	Alema Kapoi	Jr
LB	97	Zach Ritner	So
DL	98	Foi Shaw	So
DL, TE	99	Jonah Laulu	So

Special teams

Pos.	#	Name	Class
PK	2	Matthew Shipley	Fr
LS	44	Wyatt Tucker	Jr
PK, P	46	Kyler Halvorsen	Fr
PK, P	86	Ben Falck	So
PK, P	96	Adam Stack	Jr

Head coach

- Todd Graham (East Central)

Coordinators/assistant coaches

- Trent Figg (William Jewell)
  Associate head coach – defense/defensive backs
- Bo Graham (Tulsa)
  Offensive coordinator/quarterbacks
- Victor Santa Cruz (Hawaiʻi)
  Defensive ends
- Danny Phillips (Central Oklahoma)
  Defensive line
- Sam Bennett (Texas Tech)
  Offensive tackles/tight ends
- A'Lique Terry (Wake Forest)
  Offensive line
- Marcus Davis (Auburn)
  Wide receivers
- Jacob Yoro (Hawaiʻi)
  Linebackers
- Abe Elimimian (Hawaiʻi)
  Running backs
- Kim McCloud (Hawaiʻi)
  Interim cornerbacks

Support staff

- Kody Cooke (Tulsa)
  Strength and conditioning coach
- Landon Keopple (Tulsa)
  Director of football operations
- Ryan Matviko (Mercyhurst)
  Quality control (special teams)
- Colin Shaffer
  Video coordinator
- Koa Kaai (Oregon)
  Graduate assistant (offense)
- PJ Minaya (Pacific)
  Graduate assistant (offense)
- Joey Phillips (Baylor)
  Graduate assistant (defense)
- Jordan Puʻu-Robinson (Hawaiʻi)
  Graduate assistant (defense)
- Addisyn Goodson
  Director of On-campus recruiting/football marketing
- Chandler Enegren
  Recruiting and operations assistant

Legend

- (C) Team captain
- (S) Suspended
- (I) Ineligible
- Injured
- Redshirt

Roster
Last update: July 25, 2021

=== Depth chart ===
Defense

SPUR
Quentin Frazier II
OR
Eugene Ford
Hugh Nelson II

FS
Khoury Bethley
Eugene Ford

LB	LB
Penei Pavihi	Darius Muasau
Riley Wilson	Isaiah Tufaga

SS
Chima Azunna
Kai Kaneshiro

CB
Cortez Davis
Colby Burton

DE	DT	DT	DE
Jonah Laulu; OR	Blessman Ta'ala; OR	Pita Tonga; OR	DJuan Matthews; OR
DJuan Matthews	Justus Tavai	Zacchaeus McKinney	O'tay Baker

CB
Cameron Lockridge
Michael Washington

Offense

WR
Jared Smart
Zion Bowens
OR
Jalen Walthall

RB/WR
Calvin Turner
James Phillips
OR
Dior Scott

LT	LG	C	RG	RT
Ilm Manning	Micah Vanterpool	Kohl Levao	Solo Vaipulu	Gene Pryor
Kauka Umiamaka	Maurice Taʻala	Eliki Tanuvasa	Stephen Bernal-Wendt	Austin Hopp

TE
Caleb Phillips
Heliki Keliiliki
OR
Kamuela Borden

WR
Nick Mardner
Aaron Cephus
OR
Tru Edwards

QB
Chevan Cordeiro
Brayden Schager

Key reserves
RB/WR/TE Solo Turner
RB/WR/TE Steven Fiso

RB
Dae Dae Hunter
Dedrick Parson

Special teams
PK Matthew Shipley
PK Kyler Halvorsen
P Matthew Shipley
P Adam Stack
KR Calvin Turner
PR Calvin Turner
LS Wyatt Tucker
H Adam Stack

== Game summaries ==
=== At UCLA ===
Hawaii Rainbow Warriors at UCLA Bruins – Game summary

Quarter	1	2	3	4	Total
Rainbow Warriors	3	0	7	0	10
Bruins	24	7	13	0	44

at Rose Bowl, Pasadena, California

- Date: August 28
- Game time: 9:30 a.m. HST / 12:30 p.m. PDT
- Game weather: Sunny, 93 °F (34 °C)
- Game attendance: 32,982
- Referee: Scott Campbell
- TV announcers (ESPN): Beth Mowins (play-by-play), Kirk Morrison (analyst) and Dawn Davenport (sideline)

Game information
First quarter
- UCLA – Nicholas Barr-Mira 27-yard field goal, 12:00. UCLA 3–0. Drive: 4 plays, 6 yards, 0:58.
- UCLA – Zach Charbonnet 21-yard run (Nicholas Barr-Mira kick), 7:30. UCLA 10–0. Drive: 9 plays, 87 yards, 2:45.
- UCLA – Brittain Brown 1-yard run (Nicholas Barr-Mira kick), 6:06. UCLA 17–0. Drive: 4 plays, 9 yards, 1:08.
- HAW – Matthew Shipley 48-yard field goal, 1:47. UCLA 17–3. Drive: 10 plays, 44 yards, 4:19.
- UCLA – Zach Charbonnet 47-yard run (Nicholas Barr-Mira kick), 0:46. UCLA 24–3. Drive: 4 plays, 75 yards, 1:01.

Second quarter

- UCLA – Zach Charbonnet 21-yard run (Nicholas Barr-Mira kick), 11:31. UCLA 31–3. Drive: 7 plays, 61 yards, 2:35.

Third quarter

- UCLA – Kazmeir Allen 44-yard pass from Dorian Thompson-Robinson (kick failed), 13:02. UCLA 37–3. Drive: 5 plays, 75 yards, 1:58.
- UCLA – David Priebe 0-yard fumble recovery (Nicholas Barr-Mira kick), 11:20. UCLA 44–3.
- HAW – Caleb Phillips 1-yard pass from Chevan Cordeiro (Matthew Shipley kick), 3:17. UCLA 44–10. Drive: 9 plays, 90 yards, 4:24.

Fourth quarter

- No scoring plays

Statistics	HAW	UCLA
First downs	16	20
Total yards	269	392
Rushing yards	26	244
Passing yards	243	148
Turnovers	2	0
Time of possession	30:43	29:17

Team	Category	Player	Statistics
Hawaii	Passing	Chevan Cordeiro	25/47, 220 yards, TD, 2 INT
Hawaii	Rushing	Dae Dae Hunter	7 rushes, 20 yards
Hawaii	Receiving	Calvin Turner	5 receptions, 50 yards
UCLA	Passing	Dorian Thompson-Robinson	10/20, 130 yards, TD
UCLA	Rushing	Zach Charbonnet	6 rushes, 106 yards, 2 TD
UCLA	Receiving	Kazmeir Allen	2 receptions, 47 yards, TD

To open the season the Rainbow Warriors traveled to the Rose Bowl in Pasadena to face Dorian Thompson-Robinson and the UCLA Bruins out of the Pac-12 Conference. Hawaii got the ball to begin the game and went three-and-out. A botched punt gave the Bruins' offense the football at the Bows' 15. However, the Hawaii defense held the Bruins to a 27-yard field goal by Nicholas Barr-Mira, giving UCLA a 3–0 lead. Corderio and the Bows' offense went three-and-out again on their second series. Thompson-Robinson would then proceed to lead the Bruins 87 yards in 9 plays, capped by a 21-yard run by Zach Charbonnet. UCLA now led 10–0. The Bows' offense continued to struggle as Chevan Cordeiro was intercepted by Datona Jackson. The Bruins took over at the Hawaii 9. Four plays later, Brittain Brown scored on a 1-yard run, putting UCLA ahead 17–0. The Hawaii offense responded by finally driving into UCLA territory, but it was forced to settle for a 48-yard Matthew Shipley field goal to cut the deficit to 17–3. The Bows' defensive woes continued as Charbonnet scored again, this time from 47 yards out, putting UCLA ahead 24–3. The Bruins led 24–3 at the end of the first quarter. To begin the second quarter, the Bows' drove into UCLA territory. However, the ball went over on downs after Cordeiro failed to connect with Caleb Phillips on 4th-and-9. UCLA responded by taking a 31–3 lead after Charbonnet's third touchdown of the game, a 21-yard run. After trading punts, the Bows' offense achieved a 1st-and-goal at the Bruins' 9. However, the ball went over on downs after Cordeiro failed to connect with Nick Mardner. The Bruins took a 31–3 lead into the locker room.

The Bruins opened the second half by driving 75 yards in 5 plays, culminated by a 44-yard touchdown from Thompson-Robinson to Kazmeir Allen. Barr-Mira's extra point was no good, so the Bruin's lead was now 37–3. The special teams woes for Hawaii continued as Matthew Shipley's punt was blocked by Ale Kaho and recovered by David Priebe for a Bruins touchdown. UCLA's lead was now 44–3. After trading punts, Cordeiro executed a 9-play, 90-yard drive, finding Caleb Phillips for the Bows' first touchdown of the season. The UCLA lead was now 44–10. After a three-and-out for the Bows, Cordeiro on his next series was intercepted by Jay Shaw. True freshman Brayden Schager out of Highland Park, Texas saw his first collegiate action on the Bows' final series, driving to the UCLA 31 before failing to connect with James Phillips on 4th-and-3. Redshirt freshman quarterback Ethan Garbers finished out the game for the Bruins. The Bruins won the contest 44–10. Cordeiro completed 25 of 47 passes for 220 yards, a touchdown, and 2 interceptions. Schager was 3 of 6 for 23 yards. Thompson-Robinson completed 10 of 20 passes for 130 yards and a touchdown. Charbonnet ran for 106 yards and 3 touchdowns on only 6 carries. The Bruins' rushing attack outgained that of Hawaii 244 to 26.

=== Portland State ===
Portland State Vikings at Hawaii Rainbow Warriors – Game summary

Quarter	1	2	3	4	Total
Vikings	0	7	21	7	35
Rainbow Warriors	28	7	7	7	49

at Clarence T. C. Ching Athletics Complex, Honolulu, Hawaii

- Date: September 4
- Game time: 6:00 p.m. HST
- Game weather: Partly cloudy, 79 °F (26 °C)
- Game attendance: 0
- Referee: Timothy Davis
- TV announcers (Spectrum Sports PPV): Kanoa Leahey (play-by-play), Rich Miano (analyst) and Scott Robbs (sideline)

Game information
First quarter
- HAW – Nick Mardner 23-yard pass from Chevan Cordeiro (Matthew Shipley kick), 10:36. Rainbow Warriors 7–0. Drive: 11 plays, 75 yards, 4:24.
- HAW – Calvin Turner 34-yard run (Matthew Shipley kick), 6:26. Rainbow Warriors 14–0. Drive: 8 plays, 84 yards, 2:49.
- HAW – Jared Smart 20-yard pass from Chevan Cordeiro (Matthew Shipley kick), 5:41. Rainbow Warriors 21–0. Drive: 2 plays, 20 yards, 0:09.
- HAW – Dedrick Parson 17-yard run (Matthew Shipley kick), 0:22. Rainbow Warriors 28–0. Drive: 6 plays, 67 yards, 2:33.

Second quarter

- PRST – Mataio Talalemotu 38-yard pass from Davis Alexander (Cody Williams kick), 14:54. Rainbow Warriors 28–7. Drive: 3 plays, 75 yards, 0:28.
- HAW – Aaron Cephus 4-yard pass from Chevan Cordeiro (Matthew Shipley kick), 0:20. Rainbow Warriors 35–7. Drive: 10 plays, 84 yards, 3:36.

Third quarter

- PRST – Malik Walker 1-yard run (Cody Williams kick), 10:03. Rainbow Warriors 35–14. Drive: 7 plays, 40 yards, 2:17.
- HAW – Dedrick Parson 2-yard run (Matthew Shipley kick), 7:19. Rainbow Warriors 42–14. Drive: 5 plays, 60 yards, 2:38.
- PRST – Beau Kelly 23-yard pass from Davis Alexander (Cody Williams kick), 0:20. Rainbow Warriors 42–21. Drive: 8 plays, 82 yards, 2:21.
- PRST – Tyreese Shakir 0-yard fumble return (Cody Williams kick), 0:12. Rainbow Warriors 42–28.

Fourth quarter

- HAW – Dae Dae Hunter 59-yard run (Matthew Shipley kick), 9:58. Rainbow Warriors 49–28. Drive: 1 play, 59 yards, 0:11.
- PRST – Nate Bennett 11-yard pass from Davis Alexander (Cody Williams kick), 1:13. Rainbow Warriors 49–35. Drive: 7 plays, 51 yards, 2:04.

Statistics	PRST	HAW
First downs	24	25
Total yards	477	573
Rushing yards	77	268
Passing yards	400	305
Turnovers	4	4
Time of possession	29:12	30:48

Team	Category	Player	Statistics
Portland State	Passing	Davis Alexander	23/47, 400 yards, 3 TD, 2 INT
Portland State	Rushing	Malik Walker	11 rushes, 58 yards, TD
Portland State	Receiving	Beau Kelly	6 receptions, 132 yards, TD
Hawaii	Passing	Chevan Cordeiro	18/25, 305 yards, 3 TD, INT
Hawaii	Rushing	Dae Dae Hunter	16 rushes, 128 yards, TD
Hawaii	Receiving	Nick Mardner	4 receptions, 97 yards, TD

=== At Oregon State ===
Hawaii Rainbow Warriors at Oregon State Beavers – Game summary

Quarter	1	2	3	4	Total
Rainbow Warriors	0	7	13	7	27
Beavers	21	3	7	14	45

at Reser Stadium, Corvallis, Oregon

- Date: September 11
- Game time: 5:00 p.m. HST / 8:00 p.m. PDT
- Game weather: Clear, 71 °F (22 °C)
- Game attendance: 27,701
- Referee: Christian Watson
- TV announcers (FS1): Alex Faust (play-by-play) and Petros Papadakis (analyst)

Game information
First quarter
- ORST – Jack Colletto 2-yard run (Everett Hayes Kick), 10:43. Beavers 7–0. Drive: 10 plays, 65 yards, 4:17.
- ORST – B. J. Baylor 66-yard run (Everett Hayes Kick), 7:04. Beavers 14–0. Drive: 3 plays, 80 yards, 1:09.
- ORST – Zeriah Beason 6-yard pass from Chance Nolan (Everett Hayes Kick), 0:22. Beavers 21–0. Drive: 10 plays, 64 yards, 5:21.

Second quarter

- HAW – Calvin Turner 12-yard pass from Chevan Cordeiro (Matthew Shipley Kick), 10:30. Beavers 21–7. Drive: 12 plays, 75 yards, 4:52.
- ORST – Everett Hayes 27-yard field goal, 5:03. Beavers 24–7. Drive: 10 plays, 68 yards, 5:22.

Third quarter

- ORST – B. J. Baylor 30-yard run (Everett Hayes Kick), 14:46. Beavers 31–7. Drive: 1 plays, 30 yards, 0:08.
- HAW – Calvin Turner 1-yard run (pass failed), 6:45. Beavers 31–13. Drive: 9 plays, 90 yards, 3:37.
- HAW – Nick Mardner 10-yard pass from Chevan Cordeiro (Matthew Shipley Kick), 3:46. Beavers 31–20. Drive: 4 plays, 46 yards, 2:04.

Fourth quarter

- ORST – Anthony Gould 13-yard pass from Chance Nolan (Everett Hayes Kick), 14:54. Beavers 38–20. Drive: 8 plays, 77 yards, 3:44.
- HAW – Calvin Turner 3-yard run (Matthew Shipley Kick), 10:28. Beavers 38–27. Drive: 12 plays, 75 yards, 4:26.
- ORST – B. J. Baylor 1-yard run (Everett Hayes Kick), 3:12. Beavers 45–27. Drive: 15 plays, 90 yards, 7:10.

Statistics	HAW	ORST
First downs	26	28
Total yards	454	558
Rushing yards	88	256
Passing yards	366	302
Turnovers	2	1
Time of possession	26:00	34:00

Team	Category	Player	Statistics
Hawaii	Passing	Chevan Cordeiro	24/49, 366 yards, 2 TD, 2 INT
Hawaii	Rushing	Chevan Cordeiro	13 rushes, 48 yards
Hawaii	Receiving	Nick Mardner	6 receptions, 110 yards, TD
Oregon State	Passing	Chance Nolan	21/29, 302 yards, 2 TD
Oregon State	Rushing	B. J. Baylor	18 rushes, 171 yards, 3 TD
Oregon State	Receiving	Anthony Gould	7 receptions, 119 yards, TD

=== San Jose State ===
San Jose State Spartans at Hawaii Rainbow Warriors – Game summary

Quarter	1	2	3	4	Total
Spartans	0	14	0	3	17
Rainbow Warriors	7	0	6	0	13

at Clarence T. C. Ching Athletics Complex, Honolulu, Hawaii

- Date: September 18
- Game time: 6:30 p.m. HST
- Game weather: 53% humidity, 82 °F (28 °C)
- Game attendance: 0
- Referee: Brandon Cruse
- TV announcers (FS1): Alex Faust (play-by-play) and Petros Papadakis (analyst)

Game information
First quarter
- HAW – Calvin Turner 1-yard run (Matthew Shipley kick), 3:29. Rainbow Warriors 7–0. Drive: 10 plays, 71 yards, 4:32.

Second quarter

- SJSU – Isaiah Hamilton 13-yard pass from Nick Starkel (Matt Mercurio kick), 5:26. Tied 7–7. Drive: 7 plays, 44 yards, 1:55.
- SJSU – Jermain Braddock 1-yard pass from Nick Starkel (Matt Mercurio kick), 2:23. Spartans 14–7. Drive: 3 plays, 55 yards, 0:57.

Third quarter

- HAW – Matthew Shipley 25-yard field goal, 8:05. Spartans 14–10. Drive: 5 plays, 36 yards, 1:39.
- HAW – Matthew Shipley 23-yard field goal, 3:29. Spartans 14–13. Drive: 8 plays, 68 yards, 3:41.

Fourth quarter

- SJSU – Matt Mercurio 26-yard field goal, 1:19. Spartans 17–13. Drive: 7 plays, 18 yards, 3:13.

Statistics	SJSU	HAW
First downs	15	16
Total yards	291	369
Rushing yards	56	127
Passing yards	235	242
Turnovers	2	1
Time of possession	28:01	31:59

Team	Category	Player	Statistics
San Jose State	Passing	Nick Starkel	23/50, 235 yards, 2 TD, INT
San Jose State	Rushing	Kairee Robinson	21 rushes, 55 yards
San Jose State	Receiving	Dominick Mazotti	2 receptions, 59 yards
Hawaii	Passing	Chevan Cordeiro	18/39, 242 yards
Hawaii	Rushing	Dae Dae Hunter	15 rushes, 51 yards
Hawaii	Receiving	Nick Mardner	5 receptions, 97 yards

=== At New Mexico State ===
Hawaii Rainbow Warriors at New Mexico State Aggies – Game summary

Quarter	1	2	3	4	Total
Rainbow Warriors	10	7	7	17	41
Aggies	3	10	0	8	21

at Aggie Memorial Stadium, Las Cruces, New Mexico

- Date: September 25
- Game time: 2:00 p.m. HST / 6:00 p.m. MDT
- Game weather: Cloudy, 72 °F (22 °C)
- Game attendance: 13,932
- Referee: Derek Anderson
- TV announcers (KVIA-TV/FloSports/Comcast): Adam Young (play–by–play), Danny Knee (analyst) and Megan McCormick (sideline)

Game information
First quarter
- NMSU – Ethan Albertson 33-yard field goal, 9:33. Aggies 3–0. Drive: 12 plays, 60 yards, 5:27.
- HAW – Nick Mardner 74-yard pass from Chevan Cordeiro (Matthew Shipley Kick), 9:19. Rainbow Warriors 7–3. Drive: 1 play, 74 yards, 0:10.
- HAW – Matthew Shipley 25-yard field goal, 3:26. Rainbow Warriors 10–3. Drive: 9 plays, 54 yards, 4:25.

Second quarter

- HAW – Cameron Lockridge 5-yard fumble return (Matthew Shipley Kick), 13:31. Rainbow Warriors 17–3.
- NMSU – Robert Downs III 6-yard pass from Jonah Johnson (Ethan Albertson Kick), 11:27. Rainbow Warriors 17–10. Drive: 5 plays, 71 yards, 2:04.
- NMSU – Ethan Albertson 20-yard field goal, 7:58. Rainbow Warriors 17–13. Drive: 6 plays, 36 yards, 2:21.

Third quarter

- HAW – Chevan Cordeiro 1-yard run (Matthew Shipley Kick), 2:24. Rainbow Warriors 24–13. Drive: 7 plays, 38 yards, 2:38.

Fourth quarter

- HAW – Calvin Turner Jr. 14-yard run (Matthew Shipley Kick), 14:11. Rainbow Warriors 31–13. Drive: 3 plays, 50 yards, 1:23.
- NMSU – Jonah Johnson 30-yard run (Isiah Garcia-Castaneda Kick), 10:20. Rainbow Warriors 31–21. Drive: 10 plays, 85 yards, 3:46.
- HAW – Matthew Shipley 41-yard field goal, 6:52. Rainbow Warriors 34–21. Drive: 8 plays, 51 yards, 3:28.
- HAW – Dedrick Parson 19-yard run (Matthew Shipley Kick), 1:52. Rainbow Warriors 41–21. Drive: 4 plays, 35 yards, 1:02.

Statistics	HAW	NMSU
First downs	21	22
Total yards	492	401
Rushing yards	215	121
Passing yards	277	280
Turnovers	3	4
Time of possession	22:49	37:11

Team	Category	Player	Statistics
Hawaii	Passing	Chevan Cordeiro	16/25, 277 yards, TD, INT
Hawaii	Rushing	Dedrick Parson	11 rushes, 89 yards, TD
Hawaii	Receiving	Nick Mardner	4 receptions, 120 yards, TD
New Mexico State	Passing	Jonah Johnson	28/47, 280 yards, TD, INT
New Mexico State	Rushing	Juwaun Price	9 rushes, 72 yards
New Mexico State	Receiving	Jared Wyatt	9 receptions, 114 yards

=== No. 18 Fresno State ===
Fresno State Bulldogs at Hawaii Rainbow Warriors – Game summary

Quarter	1	2	3	4	Total
No. 18 Bulldogs	7	7	10	0	24
Rainbow Warriors	10	0	0	17	27

at Clarence T. C. Ching Athletics Complex, Honolulu, Hawaii

- Date: October 2
- Game time: 5:00 p.m. HST
- Game weather: Cloudy, 85 °F (29 °C)
- Game attendance: 0
- Referee: Cal McNeill
- TV announcers (CBSSN): Noah Eagle (play-by-play) & Aaron Murray (analyst)

Game information
First quarter
- HAW – Calvin Turner 1-yard run (Matthew Shipley kick), 10:11. Rainbow Warriors 7–0. Drive: 11 plays, 72 yards, 3:49.
- HAW – Matthew Shipley 34-yard field goal, 5:06. Rainbow Warriors 10–0. Drive: 6 plays, 63 yards, 2:34.
- FRES – Zane Pope 65-yard pass from Jake Haener (Cesar Silva kick), 4:13. Rainbow Warriors 10–7. Drive: 3 plays, 75 yards, 0:53.

Second quarter

- FRES – Zane Pope 7-yard pass from Jake Haener (Cesar Silva kick), 9:06. Bulldogs 14–10. Drive: 9 plays, 52 yards, 4:08.

Third quarter

- FRES – Jalen Cropper 35-yard pass from Jake Haener (Cesar Silva kick), 9:22. Bulldogs 21–10. Drive: 7 plays, 80 yards, 3:20.
- FRES – Cesar Silva 48-yard field goal, 4:29. Bulldogs 24–10. Drive: 5 plays, 30 yards, 2:11.

Fourth quarter

- HAW – Caleb Phillips 26-yard pass from Brayden Schager (Matthew Shipley kick), 12:06. Bulldogs 24–17. Drive: 4 plays, 44 yards, 2:07.
- HAW – Calvin Turner 18-yard pass from Brayden Schager (Matthew Shipley kick), 7:05. Tied 24–24. Drive: 6 plays, 60 yards, 2:55.
- HAW – Matthew Shipley 33-yard field goal, 3:33. Rainbow Warriors 27–24. Drive: 8 plays, 28 yards, 2:54.

Statistics	FRES	HAW
First downs	31	21
Total yards	505	348
Rushing yards	117	232
Passing yards	388	116
Turnovers	6	1
Time of possession	31:18	28:42

Team	Category	Player	Statistics
Fresno State	Passing	Jake Haener	28/50, 388 yards, 3 TD, 4 INT
Fresno State	Rushing	Ronnie Rivers	15 rushes, 74 yards
Fresno State	Receiving	Zane Pope	5 receptions, 113 yards, 2 TD
Hawaii	Passing	Brayden Schager	11/27, 116 yards, 2 TD
Hawaii	Rushing	Dae Dae Hunter	21 rushes, 127 yards
Hawaii	Receiving	Calvin Turner	4 receptions, 41 yards, TD

=== At Nevada ===
Hawaii Rainbow Warriors at Nevada Wolf Pack – Game summary

Quarter	1	2	3	4	Total
Rainbow Warriors	7	10	0	0	17
Wolf Pack	3	17	14	0	34

at Mackay Stadium, Reno, Nevada

- Date: October 16
- Game time: 4:30 p.m. HST / 7:30 p.m. PDT
- Game weather: Sunny, 63 °F (17 °C)
- Game attendance: 22,098
- Referee: Steve Baron
- TV: CBSSN

Statistics	HAW	NEV
First downs	17	25
Total yards	393	477
Rushing yards	188	82
Passing yards	205	395
Turnovers	5	0
Time of possession	26:01	33:59

Team	Category	Player	Statistics
Hawaii	Passing	Brayden Schager	22/38, 205 yards, 4 INT
Hawaii	Rushing	Dae Dae Hunter	8 rushes, 174 yards, 2 TD
Hawaii	Receiving	Calvin Turner	8 receptions, 83 yards
Nevada	Passing	Carson Strong	34/54, 395 yards, 2 TD
Nevada	Rushing	Toa Taua	21 rushes, 84 yards, 2 TD
Nevada	Receiving	Cole Turner	12 receptions, 175 yards

=== New Mexico State ===
New Mexico State Aggies at Hawaii Rainbow Warriors – Game summary

Quarter	1	2	3	4	Total
Aggies	3	10	14	7	34
Rainbow Warriors	10	14	10	14	48

at Clarence T. C. Ching Athletics Complex, Honolulu, Hawaii

- Date: October 23
- Game time: 6:00 p.m. HST
- Game weather: 54% humidity, 81 °F (27 °C)
- Game attendance: 1,000
- Referee: Timothy Davis
- TV: Spectrum Sports PPV

Statistics	NMSU	HAW
First downs	28	25
Total yards	485	482
Rushing yards	257	263
Passing yards	228	219
Turnovers	2	2
Time of possession	32:30	27:30

Team	Category	Player	Statistics
New Mexico State	Passing	Jonah Johnson	24/54, 228 yards, 2 INT
New Mexico State	Rushing	Juwaun Price	17 rushes, 159 yards, 2 TD
New Mexico State	Receiving	Isaiah Garcia-Castaneda	6 receptions, 82 yards
Hawaii	Passing	Brayden Schager	25/29, 219 yards
Hawaii	Rushing	Dedrick Parson	25 rushes, 161 yards, 3 TD
Hawaii	Receiving	Nick Mardner	4 receptions, 81 yards

=== At Utah State ===
Hawaii Rainbow Warriors at Utah State Aggies – Game summary

Quarter	1	2	3	4	Total
Rainbow Warriors	0	10	15	6	31
Aggies	14	6	21	10	51

at Maverik Stadium, Logan, Utah

- Date: October 30
- Game time: 9:00 a.m. HST / 1:00 p.m. MDT
- Game weather: Sunny
- Game attendance: 19,219
- Referee: Mike Cuttone
- TV: Spectrum Sports PPV

Statistics	HAW	USU
First downs	19	30
Total yards	360	564
Rushing yards	12	158
Passing yards	348	406
Turnovers	3	2
Time of possession	25:40	34:20

Team	Category	Player	Statistics
Hawaii	Passing	Chevan Cordeiro	23/39, 296 yards, 3 TD, INT
Hawaii	Rushing	Dedrick Parson	10 rushes, 30 yards
Hawaii	Receiving	Dedrick Parson	7 receptions, 115 yards, TD
Utah State	Passing	Logan Bonner	21/30, 361 yards, 4 TD
Utah State	Rushing	Elelyon Noa	23 rushes, 111 yards, TD
Utah State	Receiving	Deven Thompkins	7 receptions, 176 yards

=== No. 24 San Diego State ===
No. 24 San Diego State Aztecs at Hawaii Rainbow Warriors – Game summary

Quarter	1	2	3	4	Total
No. 24 Aztecs	7	7	0	3	17
Rainbow Warriors	7	0	0	3	10

at Clarence T. C. Ching Athletics Complex, Honolulu, Hawaii

- Date: November 6
- Game time: 5:00 p.m. HST
- Game weather: 53% humidity, 84 °F (29 °C)
- Game attendance: 6,239
- Referee: C. Watson
- TV announcers (FS1): Dan Hellie (play-by-play), Robert Smith (analysis), and Zac Kinman (producer)

Game information
First quarter
- SDSU – Greg Bell 5-yard run (Matt Araiza Kick), 6:27. Aztecs 7–0. Drive: 8 plays, 47 yards, 4:59.
- HAW – Calvin Turner 19-yard pass from Chevan Cordeiro (Matthew Shipley Kick), 2:21. Tied 7–7. Drive: 1 play, 19 yards, 0:06.

Second quarter

- SDSU – Jack Browning 13-yard run (Matt Araiza Kick), 9:43. Aztecs 14–7. Drive: 15 plays, 82 yards, 7:33.

Third quarter

- No scoring plays

Fourth quarter

- SDSU – Matt Araiza 39-yard field goal, 7:41. Aztecs 17–7. Drive: 14 plays, 57 yards, 8:26.
- HAW – Matthew Shipley 22-yard field goal, 3:00. Aztecs 17–10. Drive: 15 plays, 70 yards, 4:41.

Statistics	SDSU	HAW
First downs	15	16
Total yards	227	260
Rushing yards	128	85
Passing yards	99	175
Turnovers	1	2
Time of possession	34:07	25:53

Team	Category	Player	Statistics
San Diego State	Passing	Lucas Johnson	12/16, 99 yards
San Diego State	Rushing	Greg Bell	24 rushes, 77 yards, TD
San Diego State	Receiving	Daniel Bellinger	5 receptions, 41 yards
Hawaii	Passing	Chevan Cordeiro	19/34, 175 yards, TD, INT
Hawaii	Rushing	Dedrick Parson	11 rushes, 51 yards
Hawaii	Receiving	Dedrick Parson	5 receptions, 38 yards

=== At UNLV ===
Hawaii Rainbow Warriors at UNLV Rebels – Game summary

Quarter	1	2	3	4	Total
Rainbow Warriors	10	0	0	3	13
Rebels	7	3	10	7	27

at Allegiant Stadium, Paradise, Nevada

- Date: November 13
- Game time: 11:00 a.m. HST / 1:00 p.m. PST
- Game weather: None (played indoors)
- Game attendance: 19,623
- Referee: Cal McNeill
- TV: Spectrum Sports PPV

Game information
First quarter
- HAW – Nick Mardner 79-yard pass from Chevan Cordeiro (Matthew Shipley kick), 14:40. Rainbow Warriors 7–0. Drive: 1 play, 79 yards, 0:13.
- UNLV – Charles Williams 5-yard run (Daniel Gutierrez kick), 8:14. Tied 7–7. Drive: 6 plays, 74 yards, 3:39.
- HAW – Matthew Shipley 32-yard field goal, 2:18. Rainbow Warriors 10–7. Drive: 4 plays, 3 yards, 1:28.

Second quarter

- UNLV – Daniel Gutierrez 21-yard field goal, 0:08. Tied 10–10. Drive: 8 plays, 35 yards, 2:04.

Third quarter

- UNLV – Charles Williams 7-yard run (Daniel Gutierrez kick), 12:09. Rebels 17–10. Drive: 5 plays, 88 yards, 2:46.
- UNLV – Daniel Gutierrez 36-yard field goal, 5:39. Rebels 20–10. Drive: 8 plays, 63 yards, 5:28.

Fourth quarter

- HAW – Matthew Shipley 43-yard field goal, 10:58. Rebels 20–13. Drive: 9 plays, 43 yards, 3:47.
- UNLV – Charles Williams 47-yard run (Daniel Gutierrez kick), 1:49. Rebels 27–13. Drive: 2 plays, 47 yards, 0:15.

Statistics	HAW	UNLV
First downs	10	21
Total yards	240	465
Rushing yards	57	293
Passing yards	183	172
Turnovers	2	3
Time of possession	20:22	39:38

Team	Category	Player	Statistics
Hawaii	Passing	Chevan Cordeiro	10/23, 183 yards, TD, 2 INT
Hawaii	Rushing	Dae Dae Hunter	9 rushes, 43 yards
Hawaii	Receiving	Nick Mardner	4 receptions, 139 yards, TD
UNLV	Passing	Cameron Friel	15/25, 172 yards, 2 INT
UNLV	Rushing	Charles Williams	38 rushes, 266 yards, 3 TD
UNLV	Receiving	Kyle Williams	3 receptions, 73 yards

=== Colorado State ===
Colorado State Rams at Hawaii Rainbow Warriors – Game summary

Quarter	1	2	3	4	Total
Rams	7	3	7	28	45
Rainbow Warriors	9	20	7	14	50

at Clarence T. C. Ching Athletics Complex, Honolulu, Hawaii

- Date: November 20
- Game time: 6:00 p.m. HST
- Game weather: 67% humidity, 79 °F (26 °C)
- Game attendance: 6,575
- Referee: Tuta Salaam
- TV: Spectrum Sports PPV

Game information
First quarter
- HAW – Matthew Shipley 42-yard field goal, 12:52. Rainbow Warriors 3–0. Drive: 7 plays, 58 yards, 2:08.
- CSU – Cameron Butler 69-yard pass from Todd Centeio (Cayden Camper kick), 11:33. Rams 7–3. Drive: 3 plays, 75 yards, 1:19.
- HAW – Matthew Shipley 43-yard field goal, 9:02. Rams 7–6. Drive: 8 plays, 41 yards, 2:25.
- HAW – Matthew Shipley 34-yard field goal, 4:03. Rainbow Warriors 9–7. Drive: 7 plays, 57 yards, 2:38.

Second quarter

- CSU – Cayden Camper 30-yard field goal, 12:35. Rams 10–9. Drive: 7 plays, 12 yards, 2:25.
- HAW – Chevan Cordeiro 15-yard run (Matthew Shipley kick), 9:35. Rainbow Warriors 16–10. Drive: 9 plays, 74 yards, 2:54.
- HAW – Zion Bowens 93-yard pass from Chevan Cordeiro (run failed), 3:00. Rainbow Warriors 22–10. Drive: 2 plays, 93 yards, 0:38.
- HAW – Cameron Lockridge 40-yard interception return (Matthew Shipley kick), 0:13. Rainbow Warriors 29–10.

Third quarter

- HAW – Nick Mardner 42-yard pass from Chevan Cordeiro (Matthew Shipley kick), 9:09. Rainbow Warriors 36–10. Drive: 4 plays, 80 yards, 2:10.
- CSU – Gary Williams 3-yard pass from Todd Centeio (Cayden Camper kick), 5:00. Rainbow Warriors 36–17. Drive: 7 plays, 76 yards, 2:17.

Fourth quarter

- CSU – Cameron Butler 24-yard pass from Todd Centeio (Cayden Camper kick), 13:53. Rainbow Warriors 36–24. Drive: 9 plays, 89 yards, 3:12.
- CSU – David Bailey 31-yard run (Cayden Camper kick), 7:01. Rainbow Warriors 36–31. Drive: 4 plays, 80 yards, 0:55.
- HAW – Dedrick Parson 10-yard run (Matthew Shipley kick), 3:07. Rainbow Warriors 43–31. Drive: 9 plays, 76 yards, 3:48.
- CSU – Dante Wright 62-yard pass from Todd Centeio (Cayden Camper kick), 2:44. Rainbow Warriors 43–38. Drive: 2 plays, 62 yards, 0:15.
- HAW – Dedrick Parson 37-yard run (Matthew Shipley kick), 2:27. Rainbow Warriors 50–38. Drive: 2 plays, 41 yards, 0:14.
- CSU – Gary Williams 9-yard pass from Todd Centeio (Cayden Camper kick), 0:17. Rainbow Warriors 50–45. Drive: 9 plays, 75 yards, 2:10.

Statistics	CSU	HAW
First downs	27	25
Total yards	651	535
Rushing yards	124	129
Passing yards	527	406
Turnovers	3	2
Time of possession	30:11	29:49

Team	Category	Player	Statistics
Colorado State	Passing	Todd Centeio	29/48, 527 yards, 5 TD, 2 INT
Colorado State	Rushing	David Bailey	16 rushes, 87 yards, TD
Colorado State	Receiving	Dante Wright	8 receptions, 150 yards, TD
Hawaii	Passing	Chevan Cordeiro	23/41, 406 yards, 2 TD
Hawaii	Rushing	Dedrick Parson	11 rushes, 78 yards, 2 TD
Hawaii	Receiving	Zion Bowens	6 receptions, 172 yards, TD

=== At Wyoming ===
Hawaii Rainbow Warriors at Wyoming Cowboys – Game summary

Quarter	1	2	3	4	Total
Rainbow Warriors	14	17	0	7	38
Cowboys	0	7	7	0	14

at War Memorial Stadium, Laramie, Wyoming

- Date: November 27
- Game time: 10:00 a.m. HST / 1:00 p.m. MST
- Game weather: Sunny
- Game attendance: 14,213
- Referee: Mike Cuttone
- TV: Spectrum Sports PPV

Game information
First quarter
- HAW – Chevan Cordeiro 8-yard run (Matthew Shipley Kick), 12:06. Rainbow Warriors 7–0. Drive: 10 plays, 75 yards, 2:54.
- HAW – Calvin Turner Jr. 2-yard run (Matthew Shipley Kick), 3:49. Rainbow Warriors 14–0. Drive: 7 plays, 64 yards, 2:13.

Second quarter

- HAW – Steven Fiso 19-yard pass from Chevan Cordeiro (Matthew Shipley Kick), 12:39. Rainbow Warriors 21–0. Drive: 7 plays, 77 yards, 4:12.
- HAW – Matthew Shipley 25-yard field goal, 5:22. Rainbow Warriors 24–0. Drive: 5 plays, 32 yards, 2:13.
- WYO – Titus Swen 4-yard run (John Hoyland Kick), 1:36. Rainbow Warriors 24–7. Drive: 11 plays, 75 yards, 3:46.
- HAW – Jared Smart 50-yard pass from Chevan Cordeiro (Matthew Shipley Kick), 0:00. Rainbow Warriors 31–7. Drive: 6 plays, 75 yards, 1:31.

Third quarter

- WYO – Isaiah Neyor 30-yard pass from Levi Williams (John Hoyland Kick), 1:11. Rainbow Warriors 31–14. Drive: 9 plays, 88 yards, 2:47.

Fourth quarter

- HAW – Steven Fiso 32-yard pass from Chevan Cordeiro (Matthew Shipley Kick), 6:27. Rainbow Warriors 38–14. Drive: 5 plays, 50 yards, 3:24.

Statistics	HAW	WYO
First downs	26	17
Total yards	490	305
Rushing yards	167	119
Passing yards	323	186
Turnovers	1	0
Time of possession	31:34	28:26

Team	Category	Player	Statistics
Hawaii	Passing	Chevan Cordeiro	19/31, 323 yards, 3 TD, INT
Hawaii	Rushing	Chevan Cordeiro	14 rushes, 86 yards, TD
Hawaii	Receiving	Calvin Turner	5 receptions, 90 yards
Wyoming	Passing	Levi Williams	15/24, 161 yards, TD
Wyoming	Rushing	Levi Williams	9 rushes, 43 yards
Wyoming	Receiving	Isaiah Neyor	3 receptions, 78 yards, TD
