= 2021 Wyoming Cowboys football team =

American college football season

2021 Wyoming Cowboys football

Famous Idaho Potato Bowl champion

Famous Idaho Potato Bowl, W 52–38 vs. Kent State
- Conference: Mountain West Conference
- Mountain Division
- Record: 7–6 (2–6 MW)
- Head coach: Craig Bohl (8th season)
- Offensive coordinator: Tim Polasek (1st season)
- Offensive scheme: Pro-style, West Coast
- Defensive coordinator: Jay Sawvel (2nd season)
- Base defense: 4–3
- Home stadium: War Memorial Stadium

Uniform
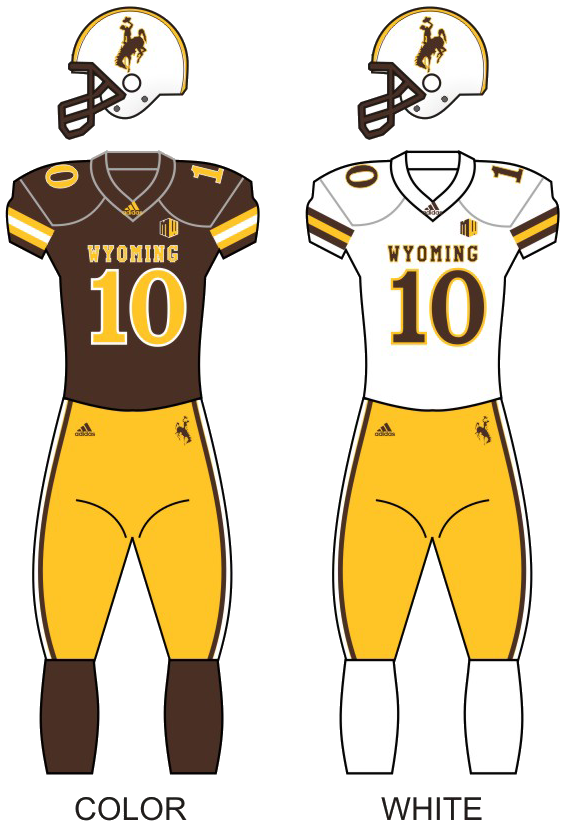

2021 Mountain West Conference football standings
	Conf.			Overall
Team	W		L	W		L
Mountain Division
No. 24 Utah State xy$	6	–	2	11	–	3
Air Force x	6	–	2	10	–	3
Boise State	5	–	3	7	–	5
Wyoming	2	–	6	7	–	6
Colorado State	2	–	6	3	–	9
New Mexico	1	–	7	3	–	9
West Division
No. 25 San Diego State xy	7	–	1	12	–	2
Fresno State	6	–	2	10	–	3
Nevada	5	–	3	8	–	5
Hawaii	3	–	5	6	–	7
San Jose State	3	–	5	5	–	7
UNLV	2	–	6	2	–	10
Championship: Utah State 46, San Diego State 13
$ – Conference champion; x – Division champion/co-champions; y – Championship game participant; Rankings from AP Poll

The 2021 Wyoming Cowboys football team represented the University of Wyoming as a member Mountain West Conference (MW) during the 2021 NCAA Division I FBS football season. Led by eighth-year head coach Craig Bohl, the Cowboys compiled an overall record of 7–6 record with mark 2–6 in conference play, tying for fourth place in the MW's Mountain Division. Wyoming was invited to the Famous Idaho Potato Bowl, where the Cowboys defeated Kent State. The team played home games at War Memorial Stadium in Laramie, Wyoming.

== Schedule ==
Date	Time	Opponent	Site	TV	Result	Attendance
September 4	2:00 p.m.	No. 12 Montana State*	War Memorial Stadium; Laramie, WY	MW Network	W 19–16	30,007
September 11	11:30 a.m.	at Northern Illinois*	Huskie Stadium; DeKalb, IL	ESPN+	W 50–43	11,334
September 18	2:00 p.m.	Ball State*	War Memorial Stadium; Laramie, WY	Stadium	W 45–12	23,467
September 25	1:30 p.m.	at UConn*	Rentschler Field; East Hartford, CT	CBSSN	W 24–22	12,538
October 9	5:00 p.m.	at Air Force	Falcon Stadium; Colorado Springs, CO	CBSSN	L 14–24	24,832
October 16	1:30 p.m.	Fresno State	War Memorial Stadium; Laramie, WY	FS2	L 0–17	20,002
October 23	1:30 p.m.	New Mexico^{†}	War Memorial Stadium; Laramie, WY	Stadium	L 3–14	20,133
October 30	2:00 p.m.	at San Jose State	CEFCU Stadium; San Jose, CA	FS2	L 21–27	13,042
November 6	1:30 p.m.	Colorado State	War Memorial Stadium; Laramie, WY (Border War)	CBSSN	W 31–17	24,926
November 12	7:00 p.m.	at Boise State	Albertsons Stadium; Boise, ID	FS1	L 13–23	35,474
November 20	6:00 p.m.	at Utah State	Maverik Stadium; Logan, UT (rivalry)	CBSSN	W 44–17	20,547
November 27	1:00 p.m.	Hawaii	War Memorial Stadium; Laramie, WY (rivalry)	Spectrum Sports PPV	L 14–38	14,213
December 21	1:30 p.m.	vs. Kent State*	Albertsons Stadium; Boise, ID (Famous Idaho Potato Bowl)	ESPN	W 52–38	10,217
*Non-conference game; ^{†}Homecoming; Rankings from STATS Poll released prior to the game

== Preseason ==
=== Award watch lists ===
Award	Player	Position	Year
Maxwell Award	Xazavian Valladay	RB	JR
Chuck Bednarik Award	Chad Muma	LB	JR
Doak Walker Award	Xazavian Valladay	RB	JR
Butkus Award	Chad Muma	LB	JR
Outland Trophy	Keegan Cryder	C	JR
Lou Groza Award	John Hoyland	PK	FR
Johnny Unitas Golden Arm Award	Sean Chambers	QB	JR

=== Mountain West media days ===
Mountain West media days were held on July 21 and 22 at the Cosmopolitan of Las Vegas. In the Mountain West preseason poll, Wyoming was picked to finish second in the Mountain Division.

==== Preseason All-Mountain West ====
All-Mountain West Offense
Position	Player	Class	Team
RB	Xazavian Valladay	JR	Wyoming
OL	Keegan Cryder	JR	Wyoming

All-Mountain West Defense
Position	Player	Class	Team
LB	Chad Muma	JR	Wyoming

== Game summaries ==
=== No. 12 (FCS) Montana State ===
	1	2	3	4	Total
No. 12 (FCS) Bobcats	7	0	0	9	16
Cowboys	0	3	0	16	19

Scoring summary

Quarter	Time	Drive			Team	Scoring information	Score	
Quarter	Time	Plays	Yards	TOP	Team	Scoring information	MTST	WYO
1	11:43	1	15	0:04	Montana State	Lance McCutcheon 15-yard touchdown reception from Matthew McKay, Blake Glessner kick good	7	0
2	3:15	8	40	3:55	Wyoming	37-yard field goal by John Hoyland	7	3
4	13:36	8	52	3:31	Wyoming	Xazavian Valladay 2-yard touchdown run, 2-point pass failed	7	9
4	10:23	7	40	3:13	Montana State	53-yard field goal by Blake Glessner	10	9
4	4:03	13	67	6:20	Wyoming	25-yard field goal by John Hoyland	10	12
4	2:17	5	75	1:46	Montana State	Treyton Pickering 1-yard touchdown reception from Matthew McKay, 2-point run failed	16	12
4	0:47	8	75	1:30	Wyoming	Treyton Welch 21-yard touchdown reception from Sean Chambers, John Hoyland kick good	16	19
"TOP" = time of possession. For other American football terms, see Glossary of American football.							16	19

- Passing leaders: Sean Chambers (WYO): 15–26, 196 YDS, 1 TD, 1 INT; Matthew McKay (MTST): 19–28, 200 YDS, 2 TD
- Rushing leaders: Xazavian Valladay (WYO): 19 CAR, 77 YDS, 1 TD; Isaiah Ifanse (MTST): 16 CAR, 103 YDS
- Receiving leaders: Ayden Eberhardt (WYO): 4 REC, 71 YDS; Lance McCutcheon (MTST): 5 REC, 71 YDS, 1 TD

=== At Northern Illinois ===
	1	2	3	4	Total
Cowboys	14	14	14	8	50
Huskies	3	7	12	21	43

Scoring summary

Quarter	Time	Drive			Team	Scoring information	Score	
Quarter	Time	Plays	Yards	TOP	Team	Scoring information	WYO	NIU
1	11:16	8	75	3:44	Wyoming	Titus Swen 22-yard touchdown run, John Hoyland kick good	7	0
1	8:27	3	50	1:21	Wyoming	Isaiah Neyor 33-yard touchdown reception from Sean Chambers, John Hoyland kick good	14	0
1	0:11	9	42	2:46	Northern Illinois	46-yard field goal by John Richardson	14	3
2	12:21	1	22	0:12	Wyoming	Xazavian Valladay 7-yard touchdown run, John Hoyland kick good	21	3
2	8:18	8	75	4:03	Northern Illinois	Clint Ratkovich 1-yard touchdown run, John Richardson kick good	21	10
2	3:12	11	65	5:06	Wyoming	Isaiah Neyor 19-yard touchdown reception from Sean Chambers, John Hoyland kick good	28	10
3	10:31	11	75	4:29	Northern Illinois	Clint Ratkovich 1-yard touchdown run, 2-point pass incomplete	28	16
3	6:50	8	65	3:41	Wyoming	Isaiah Neyor 5-yard touchdown run, John Hoyland kick good	35	16
3	6:03	2	-1	0:47	Wyoming	Interception returned 23 yards for touchdown by Chad Muma, John Hoyland kick good	42	16
3	4:34	4	70	1:23	Northern Illinois	Trayvon Rudolph 40-yard touchdown reception from Rocky Lombardi, 2-point pass incomplete	42	22
4	12:48	5	86	1:30	Northern Illinois	Harrison Waylee 75-yard touchdown run, John Richardson kick good	42	29
4	12:35	2	14	0:07	Northern Illinois	Harrison Waylee 14-yard touchdown run, John Richardson kick good	42	36
4	4:56	10	45	5:02	Northern Illinois	Clint Ratkovich 3-yard touchdown run, John Richardson kick good	42	43
4	1:35	10	75	3:21	Wyoming	Sean Chambers 9-yard touchdown run, 2-point pass good	50	43
"TOP" = time of possession. For other American football terms, see Glossary of American football.							50	43

- Passing leaders: Sean Chambers (WYO): 13–23, 204 YDS, 2 TD; Rocky Lombardi (NIU): 19–36, 233 YDS, 1 TD, 3 INT
- Rushing leaders: Xazavian Valladay (WYO): 21 CAR, 101 YDS, 1 TD; Harrison Waylee (NIU): 26 CAR, 179 YDS, 2 TD
- Receiving leaders: Isaiah Neyor (WYO): 4 REC, 87 YDS, 2 TD; Cole Tucker (NIU): 6 REC, 72 YDS

=== Ball State ===
	1	2	3	4	Total
Cardinals	0	0	6	6	12
Cowboys	10	21	0	14	45

Scoring summary

Quarter	Time	Drive			Team	Scoring information	Score	
Quarter	Time	Plays	Yards	TOP	Team	Scoring information	BALL	WYO
1	7:42	7	53	2:45	Wyoming	24-yard field goal by John Hoyland	0	3
1	5:46	5	23	1:56	Wyoming	Interception returned 52 yards for touchdown by Keyon Blankenbaker, John Hoyland kick good	0	10
2	14:55	8	80	3:14	Wyoming	Treyton Welch 1-yard touchdown reception from Sean Chambers, John Hoyland kick good	0	17
2	3:51	6	68	2:48	Wyoming	Dawaiian McNeely 16-yard touchdown run, John Hoyland kick good	0	24
2	0:17	5	31	0:25	Wyoming	Sean Chambers 1-yard touchdown run, John Hoyland kick good	0	31
3	1:59	15	87	5:34	Ball State	Will Jones 1-yard touchdown run, kick no good	6	31
4	11:04	11	75	5:55	Wyoming	Xazavian Valladay 1-yard touchdown run, John Hoyland kick good	6	38
4	8:21	8	75	2:43	Ball State	Carson Steele 19-yard touchdown run, 2-point pass incomplete	12	38
4	6:35	1	0	0:09	Wyoming	Interception returned 40 yards for touchdown by Chad Muma, John Hoyland kick good	12	45
"TOP" = time of possession. For other American football terms, see Glossary of American football.							12	45

- Passing leaders: Sean Chambers (WYO): 14–23, 201 YDS, 1 TD; John Paddock (BALL): 13–20, 82 YDS, 1 INT
- Rushing leaders: Xazavian Valladay (WYO): 14 CAR, 61 YDS, 1 TD; Carson Steele (BALL): 13 CAR, 76 YDS, 1 TD
- Receiving leaders: Isaiah Neyor (WYO): 4 REC, 84 YDS; Jayshon Jackson (BALL): 10 REC, 92 YDS

=== At UConn ===
	1	2	3	4	Total
Cowboys	0	3	7	14	24
Huskies	10	3	0	9	22

Scoring summary

Quarter	Time	Drive			Team	Scoring information	Score	
Quarter	Time	Plays	Yards	TOP	Team	Scoring information	WYO	CONN
1	11:39	7	45	3:15	UConn	28-yard field goal by Joe McFadden	0	3
1	1:25	6	74	1:06	UConn	Jay Rose 42-yard touchdown reception from Tyler Phommachanh, Joe McFadden kick good	0	10
2	12:54	5	29	2:47	UConn	29-yard field goal by Joe McFadden	0	13
2	4:44	16	72	8:06	Wyoming	24-yard field goal by John Hoyland	3	13
3	10:15	9	69	4:40	Wyoming	Isaiah Neyor 18-yard touchdown reception from Sean Chambers, John Hoyland kick good	10	13
4	11:16	16	74	6:15	UConn	35-yard field goal by Joe McFadden	10	16
4	6:31	10	77	4:39	Wyoming	Xazavian Valladay 1-yard touchdown run, John Hoyland kick good	17	16
4	3:34	5	29	2:43	Wyoming	Titus Swen 2-yard touchdown run, John Hoyland kick good	24	16
4	0:04	15	64	3:24	UConn	Nate Carter 2-yard touchdown run, 2-point pass incomplete	24	22
"TOP" = time of possession. For other American football terms, see Glossary of American football.							24	22

- Passing leaders: Sean Chambers (WYO): 15–26, 149 YDS, 1 TD, 2 INT; Tyler Phommachanh (CONN): 19–39, 171 YDS, 1 TD, 1 INT
- Rushing leaders: Xazavian Valladay (WYO): 22 CAR, 101 YDS, 1 TD; Nate Carter (CONN): 10 CAR, 65 YDS, 1 TD
- Receiving leaders: Ayden Eberhardt (WYO): 3 REC, 40 YDS; Aaron Turner (CONN): 6 REC, 49 YDS

=== At Air Force ===
	1	2	3	4	Total
Cowboys	0	14	0	0	14
Falcons	7	7	7	3	24

Scoring summary

Quarter	Time	Drive			Team	Scoring information	Score	
Quarter	Time	Plays	Yards	TOP	Team	Scoring information	WYO	AFA
1	6:42	15	75	8:18	Air Force	Brad Roberts 1-yard touchdown run, Anthony Rodriguez kick good	0	7
2	10:43	11	38	6:08	Air Force	Dane Kinamon 2-yard touchdown run, Anthony Rodriguez kick good	0	14
2	2:39	6	97	1:59	Wyoming	Sean Chambers 1-yard touchdown run, John Hoyland kick good	7	14
2	0:15	5	73	0:52	Wyoming	Isaiah Neyor 10-yard touchdown reception from Sean Chambers, John Hoyland kick good	14	14
3	5:46	8	85	4:09	Air Force	Micah Davis 13-yard touchdown reception from Haaziq Daniels, Anthony Rodriguez kick good	14	21
4	7:18	15	67	7:11	Air Force	26-yard field goal by Anthony Rodriguez	14	24
"TOP" = time of possession. For other American football terms, see Glossary of American football.							14	24

- Passing leaders: Sean Chambers (WYO): 11–28, 143 YDS, 1 TD; Haaziq Daniels (AFA): 7–10, 110 YDS, 1 TD
- Rushing leaders: Xazavian Valladay (WYO): 8 CAR, 96 YDS; Brad Roberts (AFA): 33 CAR, 140 YDS, 1 TD
- Receiving leaders: Isaiah Neyor (WYO): 3 REC, 55 YDS, 1 TD; Brandon Lewis (AFA): 5 REC, 77 YDS

=== Fresno State ===
	1	2	3	4	Total
Bulldogs	7	0	7	3	17
Cowboys	0	0	0	0	0

Scoring summary

Quarter	Time	Drive			Team	Scoring information	Score	
Quarter	Time	Plays	Yards	TOP	Team	Scoring information	FRES	WYO
1	6:57	10	41	5:47	Fresno State	Juan Rodriguez 2-yard touchdown reception from Jake Haener, Cesar Silva kick good	7	0
3	1:52	3	6	0:36	Fresno State	Jalen Cropper 3-yard touchdown reception from Jake Haener, Cesar Silva kick good	14	0
4	10:25	4	3	0:55	Fresno State	41-yard field goal by Cesar Silva	17	0
"TOP" = time of possession. For other American football terms, see Glossary of American football.							17	0

- Passing leaders: Sean Chambers (WYO): 8–23, 111 YDS, 3 INT; Jake Haener (FRES): 15–28, 96 YDS, 2 TD
- Rushing leaders: Sean Chambers (WYO): 12 CAR, 51 YDS; Jordan Mims (FRES): 13 CAR, 78 YDS
- Receiving leaders: Ayden Eberhardt (WYO): 2 REC, 45 YDS; Zane Pope (FRES): 2 REC, 33 YDS

=== New Mexico ===
	1	2	3	4	Total
Lobos	7	7	0	0	14
Cowboys	0	3	0	0	3

Scoring summary

Quarter	Time	Drive			Team	Scoring information	Score	
Quarter	Time	Plays	Yards	TOP	Team	Scoring information	UNM	WYO
1	1:22	9	77	5:28	New Mexico	Trace Bruckler 43-yard touchdown reception from Isaiah Chavez, Andrew Shelley kick good	7	0
2	4:30	9	62	4:16	Wyoming	27-yard field goal by John Hoyland	7	3
2	0:29	8	75	4:01	New Mexico	Aaron Dumas 2-yard touchdown run, Andrew Shelley kick good	14	3
"TOP" = time of possession. For other American football terms, see Glossary of American football.							14	3

- Passing leaders: Sean Chambers (WYO): 11–23, 96 YDS, 1 INT; Isaiah Chavez (UNM): 10–11, 112 YDS, 1 TD
- Rushing leaders: Xazavian Valladay (WYO): 14 CAR, 41 YDS; Isaiah Chavez (UNM): 16 CAR, 49 YDS
- Receiving leaders: Isaiah Neyor (WYO): 2 REC, 45 YDS; Kyle Jarvis (UNM): 2 REC, 46 YDS

=== At San Jose State ===
	1	2	3	4	Total
Cowboys	0	7	7	7	21
Spartans	0	17	10	0	27

Scoring summary

Quarter	Time	Drive			Team	Scoring information	Score	
Quarter	Time	Plays	Yards	TOP	Team	Scoring information	WYO	SJSU
2	11:10	7	74	3:50	San Jose State	Nick Nash 1-yard touchdown run, Matt Mercurio kick good	0	7
2	8:28	6	17	2:02	San Jose State	36-yard field goal by Matt Mercurio	0	10
2	5:18	7	65	3:10	Wyoming	Isaiah Neyor 54-yard touchdown reception from Levi Williams, John Hoyland kick good	7	10
2	1:54	7	81	3:18	San Jose State	Kairee Robinson 9-yard touchdown run, Matt Mercurio kick good	7	17
3	8:29	8	56	2:53	San Jose State	44-yard field goal by Matt Mercurio	7	20
3	7:11	3	75	1:18	Wyoming	Titus Swen 3-yard touchdown run, John Hoyland kick good	14	20
3	2:59	9	77	4:07	San Jose State	Charles Ross 44-yard touchdown reception from Nick Nash, Matt Mercurio kick good	14	27
4	2:48	4	49	1:20	Wyoming	Isaiah Neyor 12-yard touchdown reception from Levi Williams, John Hoyland kick good	21	27
"TOP" = time of possession. For other American football terms, see Glossary of American football.							21	27

- Passing leaders: Levi Williams (WYO): 12–22, 129 YDS, 2 TD, 2 INT; Nick Nash (SJSU): 11–22, 150 YDS, 1 TD
- Rushing leaders: Xazavian Valladay (WYO): 22 CAR, 172 YDS; Nick Nash (SJSU): 11 CAR, 112 YDS, 1 TD
- Receiving leaders: Isaiah Neyor (WYO): 3 REC, 72 YDS, 2 TD; Derrick Deese Jr. (SJSU): 5 REC, 81 YDS

=== Colorado State ===
	1	2	3	4	Total
Rams	7	3	0	7	17
Cowboys	7	10	7	7	31

Scoring summary

Quarter	Time	Drive			Team	Scoring information	Score	
Quarter	Time	Plays	Yards	TOP	Team	Scoring information	CSU	WYO
1	6:11	9	51	4:00	Colorado State	Dante Wright 4-yard touchdown reception from Todd Centeio, Jonathan Terry kick good	7	0
1	5:40	2	75	0:31	Wyoming	Levi Williams 43-yard touchdown run, John Hoyland kick good	7	7
2	13:59	4	97	1:07	Wyoming	Xazavian Valladay 5-yard touchdown run, John Hoyland kick good	7	14
2	11:33	8	48	2:19	Colorado State	27-yard field goal by Cayden Camper	10	14
2	1:16	7	68	2:41	Wyoming	29-yard field goal by John Hoyland	10	17
3	1:36	11	80	5:11	Wyoming	Isaiah Neyor 25-yard touchdown reception from Levi Williams, John Hoyland kick good	10	24
4	7:51	8	37	3:12	Wyoming	Isaiah Neyor 15-yard touchdown reception from Levi Williams, John Hoyland kick good	10	31
4	3:38	12	75	4:13	Colorado State	Dante Wright 11-yard touchdown reception from Todd Centeio, Jonathan Terry kick good	17	31
"TOP" = time of possession. For other American football terms, see Glossary of American football.							17	31

- Passing leaders: Levi Williams (WYO): 9–16, 92 YDS, 2 TD; Todd Centeio (CSU): 20–36, 187 YDS, 2 TD, 2 INT
- Rushing leaders: Titus Swen (WYO): 21 CAR, 166 YDS; David Bailey (CSU): 19 CAR, 88 YDS
- Receiving leaders: Isaiah Neyor (WYO): 3 REC, 45 YDS, 2 TD; Trey McBride (CSU): 9 REC, 98 YDS

=== At Boise State ===
	1	2	3	4	Total
Cowboys	0	7	0	6	13
Broncos	7	3	3	10	23

Scoring summary

Quarter	Time	Drive			Team	Scoring information	Score	
Quarter	Time	Plays	Yards	TOP	Team	Scoring information	WYO	BSU
1	3:07	9	72	4:20	Boise State	Riley Smith 2-yard touchdown reception from Hank Bachmeier, Jonah Dalmas kick good	0	7
2	4:42	8	76	4:28	Wyoming	Titus Swen 7-yard touchdown run, John Hoyland kick good	7	7
2	0:00	7	62	0:52	Boise State	43-yard field goal by Jonah Dalmas	7	10
3	8:51	12	54	6:09	Boise State	38-yard field goal by Jonah Dalmas	7	13
4	7:39	2	13	0:52	Boise State	Andrew Van Buren 12-yard touchdown run, Jonah Dalmas kick good	7	20
4	0:59	12	62	6:05	Boise State	29-yard field goal by Jonah Dalmas	7	23
4	0:04	3	75	0:55	Wyoming	Isaiah Neyor 74-yard touchdown reception from Levi Williams, 2-point pass failed	13	23
"TOP" = time of possession. For other American football terms, see Glossary of American football.							13	23

- Passing leaders: Levi Williams (WYO): 11–18, 155 YDS, 1 TD, 1 INT; Hank Bachmeier (BSU): 23–32, 225 YDS, 1 TD
- Rushing leaders: Titus Swen (WYO): 13 CAR, 59 YDS, 1 TD; George Holani (BSU): 20 CAR, 102 YDS
- Receiving leaders: Isaiah Neyor (WYO): 6 REC, 126 YDS, 1 TD; Khalil Shakir (BSU): 8 REC, 83 YDS

=== At Utah State ===
	1	2	3	4	Total
Cowboys	14	10	17	3	44
Aggies	14	3	0	0	17

Scoring summary

Quarter	Time	Drive			Team	Scoring information	Score	
Quarter	Time	Plays	Yards	TOP	Team	Scoring information	WYO	USU
1	7:47	8	64	2:52	Wyoming	Isaiah Neyor 40-yard touchdown reception from Levi Williams, John Hoyland kick good	7	0
1	3:38	12	75	4:09	Utah State	Brandon Bowling 10-yard touchdown reception from Logan Bonner, Connor Coles kick good	7	7
1	3:25				Wyoming	Kickoff returned 99 yards for touchdown by Cameron Stone, John Hoyland kick good	14	7
1	2:39	4	65	0:46	Utah State	Devin Thompkins 41-yard touchdown reception from Logan Bonner, Connor Coles kick good	14	14
2	6:50	8	55	3:39	Wyoming	Joshua Cobbs 17-yard touchdown reception from Levi Williams, John Hoyland kick good	21	14
2	1:48	8	73	3:25	Wyoming	28-yard field goal by John Hoyland	24	14
2	0:07	8	45	1:34	Utah State	36-yard field goal by Connor Coles	24	17
3	11:56	2	56	0:37	Wyoming	Titus Swen 43-yard touchdown run, John Hoyland kick good	31	17
3	5:14	10	69	5:10	Wyoming	24-yard field goal by John Hoyland	34	17
3	1:29	2	98	0:53	Wyoming	Titus Swen 98-yard touchdown run, John Hoyland kick good	41	17
4	6:13	7	42	4:16	Wyoming	34-yard field goal by John Hoyland	44	17
"TOP" = time of possession. For other American football terms, see Glossary of American football.							44	17

- Passing leaders: Levi Williams (WYO): 12–15, 242 YDS, 2 TD, 1 INT; Logan Bonner (USU): 19–40, 181 YDS, 2 TD
- Rushing leaders: Titus Swen (WYO): 15 CAR, 169 YDS, 2 TD; Calvin Tyler Jr. (USU): 18 CAR, 109 YDS
- Receiving leaders: Isaiah Neyor (WYO): 4 REC, 125 YDS, 1 TD; Deven Thompkins (USU): 5 REC, 67 YDS, 1 TD

=== Hawaii ===
	1	2	3	4	Total
Rainbow Warriors	14	17	0	7	38
Cowboys	0	7	7	0	14

Scoring summary

Quarter	Time	Drive			Team	Scoring information	Score	
Quarter	Time	Plays	Yards	TOP	Team	Scoring information	HAW	WYO
1	12:06	10	75	2:54	Hawaii	Chevan Cordeiro 8-yard touchdown run, Matthew Shipley kick good	7	0
1	3:49	7	64	2:13	Hawaii	Calvin Turner Jr. 2-yard touchdown run, Matthew Shipley kick good	14	0
2	12:39	7	77	4:12	Hawaii	Steven Fiso 19-yard touchdown reception from Chevan Cordeiro, Matthew Shipley kick good	21	0
2	5:22	5	32	2:13	Hawaii	25-yard field goal by Matthew Shipley	24	0
2	1:36	11	75	3:46	Wyoming	Titus Swen 4-yard touchdown run, John Hoyland kick good	24	7
2	0:00	6	75	1:31	Hawaii	Jared Smart 50-yard touchdown reception from Chevan Cordeiro, Matthew Shipley kick good	31	7
3	1:11	9	88	2:47	Wyoming	Isaiah Neyor 30-yard touchdown reception from Levi Williams, John Hoyland kick good	31	14
4	6:27	5	50	3:24	Hawaii	Steven Fiso 32-yard touchdown reception from Chevan Cordeiro, Matthew Shipley kick good	38	14
"TOP" = time of possession. For other American football terms, see Glossary of American football.							38	14

- Passing leaders: Levi Williams (WYO): 15–24, 161 YDS, 1 TD; Chevan Cordeiro (HAW): 19–31, 323 YDS, 3 TD, 1 INT
- Rushing leaders: Levi Williams (WYO): 9 CAR, 43 YDS; Chevan Cordeiro (HAW): 14 CAR, 86 YDS, 1 TD
- Receiving leaders: Isaiah Neyor (WYO): 3 REC, 78 YDS, 1 TD; Calvin Turner Jr. (HAW): 5 REC, 90 YDS

=== Kent State—Famous Idaho Potato Bowl ===
	1	2	3	4	Total
Golden Flashes	14	10	0	14	38
Cowboys	7	14	14	17	52

Scoring summary

Quarter	Time	Drive			Team	Scoring information	Score	
Quarter	Time	Plays	Yards	TOP	Team	Scoring information	KENT	WYO
1	7:06	9	67	4:19	Wyoming	Levi Williams 5-yard touchdown run, John Hoyland kick good	0	7
1	6:52	1	80	0:14	Kent State	Dante Cephas 80-yard touchdown reception from Dustin Crum, Andrew Glass kick good	7	7
1	0:54	11	71	3:49	Kent State	Dustin Crum 12-yard touchdown run, Andrew Glass kick good	14	7
2	12:21	6	49	2:28	Kent State	36-yard field goal by Andrew Glass	17	7
2	5:39	4	77	1:50	Wyoming	Levi Williams 50-yard touchdown run, John Hoyland kick good	17	14
2	1:42	5	74	2:22	Wyoming	Isaiah Neyor 42-yard touchdown reception from Levi Williams, John Hoyland kick good	17	21
2	0:24	6	75	1:18	Kent State	Ja'Shaun Poke 3-yard touchdown reception from Dustin Crum, Andrew Glass kick good	24	21
3	10:28	8	73	4:32	Wyoming	Levi Williams 27-yard touchdown run, John Hoyland kick good	24	28
3	2:42	9	76	4:34	Wyoming	Xazavian Valladay 3-yard touchdown run, John Hoyland kick good	24	35
4	12:49	1	80	0:12	Wyoming	Levi Williams 80-yard touchdown run, John Hoyland kick good	24	42
4	11:13	4	71	1:36	Kent State	Hayden Junker 6-yard touchdown reception from Dustin Crum, Andrew Glass kick good	31	42
4	7:29	7	43	3:44	Wyoming	44-yard field goal by John Hoyland	31	45
4	3:11	2	62	0:52	Wyoming	Trey Smith 49-yard touchdown run, John Hoyland kick good	31	52
4	2:54	1	73	0:17	Kent State	Devontez Walker 73-yard touchdown reception from Dustin Crum, Andrew Glass kick good	38	52
"TOP" = time of possession. For other American football terms, see Glossary of American football.							38	52

- Passing leaders: Levi Williams (WYO): 9–11, 127 YDS, 1 TD; Dustin Crum (KENT): 17–27, 316 YDS, 4 TD
- Rushing leaders: Levi Williams (WYO): 16 CAR, 200 YDS, 4 TD; Marquez Cooper (KENT): 24 CAR, 125 YDS
- Receiving leaders: Isaiah Neyor (WYO): 5 REC, 87 YDS, 1 TD; Dante Cephas (KENT): 4 REC, 116 YDS, 1 TD

== Personnel ==
=== Coaching staff ===
Name	Position	Seasons at Wyoming	Alma mater	Before Wyoming
Craig Bohl	Head coach	8	Nebraska (1982)	North Dakota State – Head coach (2013)
Tim Polasek	Offensive coordinator / quarterbacks	1	Concordia (2002)	Iowa – Offensive line (2020)
Jay Sawvel	Defensive coordinator / Safeties	2	Mount Union (1993)	Wake Forest – Defensive coordinator / cornerbacks coach (2018)
Aaron Bohl	Linebackers	5	Minnesota State–Moorhead (2016)	Wyoming – Graduate assistant (2018)
Benny Boyd	Cornerbacks / co-special teams coordinator	2	Aurora (2000)	Eastern Illinois – Cornerbacks Coach / special teams coach (2019)
Marty English	Defensive ends	2	Northern Colorado (1986)	Northern Colorado – Associate head coach / defensive coordinator / linebackers coach (2019)
Derek Frazier	Offensive line	1	Northern Colorado (1997)	New York Jets – Assistant Offensive Line (2020)
Mike Grant	Offensive passing game coordinator / wide receivers	6	Nebraska (1993)	North Texas – Wide receivers coach / receiving coordinator (2014)
Gordie Haug	Running backs / Director of player personnel	8	Bemidji State (2009)	North Dakota State – Running backs coach (2013)
Pete Kaligis	Defensive run game coordinator / Defensive tackles / Nose Tackles	13	Washington (1994)	Montana – Offensive line coach (2008)
Shannon Moore	Tight ends / Fullbacks / co-special teams coordinator	3	Black Hills State (2000)	East Carolina – Tight ends coach / recruiting coordinator (2018)
Eric Donoval	Director of Sports Performance / Head Football Strength and Conditioning	4	Wisconsin–La Crosse (2010)	LSU – Assistant Strength and Conditioning Coach (2017)

=== Roster ===
2021 Wyoming Cowboys football team roster
Quarterback: 2 Sean Chambers – (redshirt) sophomore (6'3", 225); 3 Gavin Beerup – (redshirt) freshman (6'5", 201); 12 Jayden Clemons – junior (6'1", 208); 13 Hank Gibbs – (redshirt) freshman (6'5", 226); 15 Levi Williams – (redshirt) freshman (6'5", 224); Tailback: 6 Xazavian Valladay – (redshirt) junior (6'0", 198); 7 Trey Smith – graduate (6'0", 213); 8 Titus Swen – sophomore (5'11", 202); 21 Jeremy Hollingsworth – (redshirt) freshman (5'9", 205); 22 Joseph Braasch – freshman (6'1", 210); 23 Alphonzo Andrews Jr. – (redshirt) freshman (5'10", 185); 24 D.Q. James – freshman (5'7", 180); 28 Jordan Vaughn – freshman (6'2", 220); 30 Dawaiin McNeely – (redshirt) freshman (6'2", 203); Fullback: 32 Dalton Strouss – (redshirt) freshman (5'8", 213); 35 Kimball Madsen – freshman (6'1", 210); 36 Caleb Driskill – freshman (6'2", 235); Wide receiver: 4 Devin Jennings – (redshirt) freshman (6'2", 189); 5 Isaiah Neyor – (redshirt) freshman (6'3", 210); 9 Alex Brown – (redshirt) freshman (6'4", 190); 11 Wyatt Wieland – (redshirt) sophomore (6'1", 197); 14 Tyrese Grant – freshman (6'0", 180); 16 Gunner Gentry – junior (6'3", 208); 17 Jaylen Sargent – freshman (6'2", 170); 18 Joshua Cobbs – freshman (6'4", 196); 19 Ayden Eberhardt – (redshirt) senior (6'2", 195); 20 Ryan Marquez – (redshirt) sophomore (6'1", 189); 29 Caleb Cooley – sophomore (5'7", 170); 83 Will Pelissier – (redshirt) freshman (6'3", 200); 87 Chance Hofer – (redshirt) sophomore (6'0", 208); Tight end: 80 Parker Christensen – (redshirt) freshman (6'2", 225); 81 Treyton Welch – sophomore (6'3", 230); 82 Jackson Marcotte – (redshirt) sophomore (6'7", 257); 84 John Michael Gyllenborg – freshman (6'5", 225); 85 Ryland Swarthout – freshman (6'3", 225); 86 Nick Miles – freshman (6'5", 253); 87 Colin O'Brien – sophomore (6'6", 238)	Offensive lineman: 50 Jack Lookabaugh – (redshirt) freshman (6'5", 289); 53 Mana Taimani – freshman (6'5", 282); 58 Latrell Bible – (redshirt) freshman (6'4", 300); 60 Marco Machado – (redshirt) sophomore (6'4", 312); 62 Rudy Stofer – (redshirt) junior (6'6", 308); 64 Kohl Herbolsheimer – freshman (6'3", 298); 65 Zach Watts – (redshirt) sophomore (6'5", 302); 66 Jack Walsh – freshman (6'3", 290); 68 Mason Schultz – (redshirt) freshman (6'4", 287); 69 Eric Abojei – (redshirt) junior (6'5", 328); 70 Malik Williams – freshman (6'4", 274); 71 Carlos Harrison – (redshirt) freshman (6'4", 281); 72 Caden Barnett – freshman (6'5", 305); 73 Keegan Cryder – (redshirt) junior (6'4", 309); 74 Blayne Baker – (redshirt) sophomore (6'5", 305); 75 Frank Crum – (redshirt) sophomore (6'7", 314); 76 Emmanuel Pregnon – freshman (6'6", 297); 77 Nofoafia Tulafono – freshman (6'2", 338); 78 Alonzo Velazquez – senior (6'6", 313); 79 Logan Harris – senior (6'3", 310); Defensive lineman: 40 Tyce Westland – freshman (6'5", 220); 44 Victor Jones – (redshirt) junior (6'4", 245); 49 Teagan Liufau – (redshirt) sophomore (6'3", 250); 51 Solomon Byrd – (redshirt) sophomore (6'4", 249); 52 Jack Boyer – (redshirt) sophomore (6'4", 225); 54 Sabastian Harsh – (redshirt) freshman (6'3", 236); 55 Claude Cole – (redshirt) sophomore (6'4", 266); 58 Micah Young – freshman (6'2", 210); 59 Oluwaseyi Omotosho – freshman (6'2", 239); 63 Ben Florentine – freshman (6'1", 210); 86 Braden Siders – freshman (6'3", 225); 87 Akili Bonner – (redshirt) freshman (6'4", 261); 88 Garrett Crall – senior (6'5", 233); 89 JJ Uphold – freshman (6'5", 240); 90 Gavin Meyer – freshman (6'4", 257); 91 Jaylen Pate – (redshirt) freshman (6'3", 241); 92 Duncan Radakovich – (redshirt) freshman (6'5", 252); 93 DeVonne Harris – (redshirt) freshman (6'4", 217); 94 Cole Godbout – (redshirt) sophomore (6'4", 274); 95 Caleb Robinson – freshman (6'2", 265); 96 Jordan Bertagnole – (redshirt) freshman (6'4", 275); 97 Ethan Drewes – sophomore (6'3", 240); 98 Ravontae Holt – (redshirt) junior (6'4", 287); 99 Will Evans – freshman (6'3", 245)	Linebackers: 6 Keonte Glinton – (redshirt) freshman (6'0", 179); 18 Keyon Blankenbaker – (redshirt) junior (5'10", 185); 22 Jovan Marsh – freshman (5'11", 170); 25 Blake Harrington – (redshirt) sophomore (5'11", 183); 28 Easton Gibbs – (redshirt) freshman (6'2", 216); 30 Buck Coors – (redshirt) freshman (5'11", 178); 32 Sam Scott – freshman (6'2", 215); 34 Tommy Wroblewski – freshman (6'2", 185); 43 Shae Suiaunoa – (redshirt) freshman (6'3", 227); 47 Brent VanderVeen – freshman (6'2", 220); 48 Chad Muma – junior (6'3", 242); 50 Tommy McEvoy – freshman (6'2", 195); 53 Connor Shay – freshman (6'2", 210); 57 Brady Bohlinger – (redshirt) freshman (6'2", 226); Defensive backs: 2 Cameron Murray – (redshirt) sophomore (6'1", 180); 5 Esaias Gandy – senior (6'1", 198); 8 Rome Weber – (redshirt) sophomore (5'11", 196); 12 Cameron Stone – freshman (5'10", 175); 13 Zaire Jackson – freshman (5'11", 170); 14 Miles Williams – junior (6'1", 195); 17 Tre Dean – freshman (5'9", 160); 19 Kolbey Taylor – freshman (6'2", 175); 20 Azizi Hearn – junior (6'1", 202); 21 C.J. Coldon – (redshirt) junior (6'1", 180); 26 Braden Smith – (redshirt) senior (5'10", 186); 29 Mathew Posas – (redshirt) freshman (5'8", 165); 31 Wyett Ekeler – freshman (5'11", 190); 42 Isaac White – freshman (6'1", 195); Placekicker/Punter: 27 Ralph Fawaz – (redshirt) freshman (6'1", 195); 42 Luke Glassrock – (redshirt) freshman (5'10", 189); 46 John Hoyland – freshman (5'10", 194); Longsnapper: 45 Read Sunn – (redshirt) freshman (6'2", 232); Legend: (C) Team captain; (S) Suspended; (I) Ineligible; Injured; Redshirt

=== 2021 recruiting class ===
Wyoming signed 19 players to scholarships during their recruiting period.

College recruiting
Name	Hometown	School	Height	Weight	Commit date
Caden Barnett; OL	Justin, TX	Northwest HS	6 ft 5 in (1.96 m)	305 lb (138 kg)	Nov 24, 2020
Caden Barnett; OL	Recruit ratings: Scout: Rivals: 247Sports: ESPN:				
Wrook Brown; S	Salado, TX	Salado HS	5 ft 11 in (1.80 m)	175 lb (79 kg)	Dec 1, 2020
Wrook Brown; S	Recruit ratings: Scout: Rivals: 247Sports: ESPN:				
Tony Evans Jr. WR	Lancaster, TX	Lancaster HS	6 ft 2 in (1.88 m)	185 lb (84 kg)	Dec 27, 2020
Tony Evans Jr. WR	Recruit ratings: Scout: Rivals: 247Sports: ESPN:				
Will Evans; DT	Houston, TX	C.E. King HS	6 ft 3 in (1.91 m)	245 lb (111 kg)	Nov 29, 2020
Will Evans; DT	Recruit ratings: Scout: Rivals: 247Sports: ESPN:				
John Michael Gyllenborg; TE	Leawood, KS	Rockhurst HS	6 ft 5 in (1.96 m)	225 lb (102 kg)	Dec 2, 2020
John Michael Gyllenborg; TE	Recruit ratings: Scout: Rivals: 247Sports: ESPN:				
Zaire Jackson; CB	Parker, CO	Valor Christian HS	5 ft 11 in (1.80 m)	170 lb (77 kg)	Aug 24, 2020
Zaire Jackson; CB	Recruit ratings: Scout: Rivals: 247Sports: ESPN:				
DQ James; RB	Lancaster, TX	Lancaster HS	5 ft 7 in (1.70 m)	180 lb (82 kg)	Feb 3, 2021
DQ James; RB	Recruit ratings: Scout: Rivals: 247Sports: ESPN:				
Andrew Johnson; S	Cheyenne, WY	Central HS	6 ft 1 in (1.85 m)	185 lb (84 kg)	Oct 11, 2020
Andrew Johnson; S	Recruit ratings: Scout: Rivals: 247Sports: ESPN:				
Jovan Marsh; CB	Robbins, IL	Marist HS	5 ft 11 in (1.80 m)	170 lb (77 kg)	Aug 2, 2020
Jovan Marsh; CB	Recruit ratings: Scout: Rivals: 247Sports: ESPN:				
Tommy McEvoy; LB	Clarkson, NE	Clarkson–Leigh HS	6 ft 2 in (1.88 m)	195 lb (88 kg)	
Tommy McEvoy; LB	Recruit ratings: Scout: Rivals: 247Sports: ESPN:				
Jaylen Sargent; WR	Logan, UT	Logan HS	6 ft 2 in (1.88 m)	170 lb (77 kg)	Nov 24, 2020
Jaylen Sargent; WR	Recruit ratings: Scout: Rivals: 247Sports: ESPN:				
Sam Scott; LB	Omaha, NE	Skutt Catholic HS	6 ft 2 in (1.88 m)	215 lb (98 kg)	Oct 22, 2020
Sam Scott; LB	Recruit ratings: Scout: Rivals: 247Sports: ESPN:				
Kolbey Taylor; CB	Houston, TX	Pasadena Memorial HS	6 ft 2 in (1.88 m)	175 lb (79 kg)	Nov 18, 2020
Kolbey Taylor; CB	Recruit ratings: Scout: Rivals: 247Sports: ESPN:				
JJ Uphold; DT	Bakersfield, CA	Garces Memorial HS	6 ft 5 in (1.96 m)	240 lb (110 kg)	Aug 30, 2020
JJ Uphold; DT	Recruit ratings: Scout: Rivals: 247Sports: ESPN:				
Jordon Vaughn; RB	Manvel, TX	Manvel HS	6 ft 2 in (1.88 m)	220 lb (100 kg)	Nov 3, 2020
Jordon Vaughn; RB	Recruit ratings: Scout: Rivals: 247Sports: ESPN:				
Jack Walsh; OL	Palatine, IL	William Fremd HS	6 ft 3 in (1.91 m)	290 lb (130 kg)	Aug 14, 2021
Jack Walsh; OL	Recruit ratings: Scout: Rivals: 247Sports: ESPN:				
Tyce Westland; DE	Pleasanton, NE	Pleasanton HS	6 ft 5 in (1.96 m)	220 lb (100 kg)	Jul 23, 2020
Tyce Westland; DE	Recruit ratings: Scout: Rivals: 247Sports: ESPN:				
Tommy Wroblewski; S	St. Paul, NE	St. Paul HS	6 ft 2 in (1.88 m)	185 lb (84 kg)	Oct 27, 2020
Tommy Wroblewski; S	Recruit ratings: Scout: Rivals: 247Sports: ESPN:				
Micah Young; DE	San Antonio HS	Southside HS	6 ft 2 in (1.88 m)	210 lb (95 kg)	Nov 29, 2020
Micah Young; DE	Recruit ratings: Scout: Rivals: 247Sports: ESPN:				
Overall recruit ranking: Scout: 111 Rivals: 98 247Sports: 111 ESPN: –
Note: In many cases, Scout, Rivals, 247Sports, On3, and ESPN may conflict in their listings of height and weight.; In these cases, the average was taken. ESPN grades are on a 100-point scale.; Sources: "2021 Team Ranking". Rivals.com.

== Awards and honors ==
=== All-conference ===
All-Mountain West teams were announced on November 30, 2021.

Position	Player	Class
First Team Defense
LB	Chad Muma	SR

Position	Player	Class
Second Team Offense
RB	Xazavian Valladay	SR
OL	Keegan Cryder	SR
WR	Isaiah Neyor	SO
Second Team Defense
CB	C.J. Coldon	JR

Honorable Mentions

- Garrett Crall, Sr., DL
- Cole Godbout, Jr., DL
- Logan Harris, Sr., OL

=== All-American ===
- Chad Muma, Sr., LB – 2nd Team (WCFF), 3rd Team (AP)

=== All-star games ===
- Chad Muma, Sr., LB – Senior Bowl

== Statistics ==
=== Team ===
Team Statistics
	Wyoming	Opponents
Points	330	308
First Downs	250	254
Rushing	132	121
Passing	96	117
Penalty	22	16
Rushing Yards	2742	2348
Rushing Attempts	543	514
Average Per Rush	5.0	4.6
Long	98	75
Rushing TDs	24	17
Passing yards	2115	2467
Comp–Att	162–297	220–378
Comp %	54.5%	58.2%
Average Per Game	162.7	189.8
Average per Attempt	7.1	6.5
Passing TDs	15	21
INT's	12	10
Touchdowns	43	38
Passing	15	21
Rushing	24	17
Defensive	3	0
Interceptions	10	12
Yards	138	145
Total Offense	4857	4815
Total Plays	840	892
Average Yards/Game	373.6	370.4
Kick Returns: # – Yards	20–460	28–578
TDs	1	0
Long	99	72
Punts	57	58
Yards	2415	2505
Average	42.4	43.2
Punt Returns: # – Yards	12–46	16–146
TDs	0	0
Long	12	31
Fumbles – Fumbles Lost	17–6	10–5
Penalties – Yards	66–584	63–516
3rd–Down Conversions	75/173 (43.4%)	79/189 (41.8%)
4th–Down Conversions	7/20 (35.0%)	8/25 (32.0%)
Field Goals	10–14	16–23
Sacks	24	22
Yards	167	144

=== Offense ===
Passing Statistics
NAME	GP	CMP	ATT	YDS	CMP%	TD	INT	RAT
Sean Chambers	9	90	177	1,125	50.8	6	7	107.5
Levi Williams	9	72	120	990	60.0	9	5	145.7
Totals	13	162	297	2,115	54.5	15	12	122.9

Rushing Statistics
NAME	GP	CAR	YDS	AVG	LONG	TD
Xazavian Valladay	13	209	1,060	5.1	74	6
Titus Swen	13	132	785	5.9	98	7
Levi Williams	9	72	482	6.7	80	5
Sean Chambers	9	71	209	2.9	20	3
Dawaiian McNeely	11	17	113	6.6	18	1
Trey Smith	11	14	87	6.2	49	1
Isaiah Neyor	13	12	23	1.9	8	1
Ayden Eberhardt	8	3	9	3.0	6	0
Jeremy Hollingsworth	6	1	2	2.0	2	0
Tyrese Grant	6	2	-11	-5.5	0	0
Team	13	9	-17	-1.9	0	0
Totals	13	543	2,724	5.0	98	24

Receiving Statistics
NAME	GP	REC	YDS	AVG	LONG	TD
Isaiah Neyor	13	44	878	20.0	74	12
Joshua Cobbs	11	25	245	9.8	24	1
Xazavian Valladay	13	22	228	10.4	40	0
Ayden Eberhardt	8	21	298	14.2	32	0
Treyton Welch	12	19	163	8.6	32	2
Parker Christensen	13	13	127	9.8	16	0
Titus Swen	13	5	24	4.8	9	0
Wyatt Wieland	13	4	60	15.0	23	0
Alex Brown	9	3	33	11.0	19	0
Colin O'Brien	11	2	27	13.5	17	0
Trey Smith	11	1	15	15.0	15	0
Rome Weber	12	1	6	6.0	6	0
Jackson Marcotte	8	1	6	6.0	6	0
Totals	13	161	2,110	13.1	74	15

=== Defense ===
Defensive Statistics
#	NAME	GP	SOLO	AST	TOT	TFL-YDS	SACKS	INT	BU	QBH	FR	FF	BLK	SAF
48	Chad Muma	13	85	57	142	8.0–21	1.5	3	1	2	1	0	1	0
28	Easton Gibbs	13	51	39	90	7–32	2	0	4	1	0	1	0	0
94	Cole Godbout	13	39	31	70	7–31	5	0	5	5	0	0	0	0
21	C.J. Coldon	13	48	20	68	4.5–15	1	0	10	0	1	0	0	0
88	Garrett Crall	13	24	20	44	6–23	2.5	0	2	4	0	0	0	0
5	Esaias Gandy	10	27	17	44	1.5–4	0	1	0	0	0	0	0	0
8	Rome Weber	12	35	7	42	3–16	0.5	1	3	1	0	1	0	0
96	Jordan Bertagnole	13	20	18	38	3.5–11	0.5	0	0	0	1	1	0	0
51	Solomon Byrd	8	21	16	37	3.5–19	3.5	0	0	2	0	0	0	0
42	Isaac White	13	26	9	35	2–8	1	1	1	1	1	0	0	0
18	Keyon Blankenbaker	11	24	9	33	1–3	0	1	1	0	0	0	0	0
20	Azizi Hearn	13	22	8	30	0–0	0	0	5	0	0	0	0	0
26	Braden Smtih	13	20	8	28	0–0	0	0	0	0	0	1	0	0
44	Victor Jones	13	16	8	24	4.5–32	3.5	1	2	1	0	1	0	0
91	Jaylen Pate	13	14	6	20	1–4	0.5	0	1	2	1	0	0	0
95	Caleb Robinson	10	11	6	17	1–2	0	0	0	0	0	0	0	0
98	Ravontae Holt	6	6	4	10	2.5–13	0	0	3	0	0	0	0	
6	Keonte Glinton	11	9	1	10	0–0	0	1	3	0	0	0	0	0
12	Cameron Stone	12	7	1	8	0–0	0	0	0	0	0	0	0	0
54	Sabastian Harsh	13	5	2	7	0–0	0	0	0	0	0	0	0	0
31	Wyett Ekeler	11	5	0	5	0–0	0	0	0	0	0	0	0	0
7	Trey Smith	11	5	1	6	0–0	0	0	0	0	0	0	0	0
14	Miles Williams	7	5	0	5	0–0	0	1	0	0	0	0	0	0
93	DeVonne Harris	10	2	2	4	0–0	0	0	1	0	0	0	0	0
49	Teagan Liufau	13	1	3	4	0.5–2	0	0	0	0	0	0	0	0
43	Shae Suiaunoa	13	1	3	4	0–0	0	0	0	0	0	0	0	0
53	Connor Shay	12	1	2	3	0–0	0	0	0	0	0	0	0	0
36	Caleb Driskill	13	1	2	3	0–0	0	0	0	0	0	0	0	0
29	Caleb Cooley	13	2	1	3	0–0	0	0	0	0	0	0	0	0
11	Wyatt Wieland	13	2	0	2	0–0	0	0	0	0	0	0	0	0
52	Jack Boyer	1	0	2	2	0–0	0	0	0	0	0	0	0	0
15	Levi Williams	9	2	0	2	0–0	0	0	0	0	0	0	0	0
25	Blake Harrington	12	2	0	2	0–0	0	0	0	0	0	0	0	0
6	Xazavian Valladay	13	2	0	2	0–0	0	0	0	0	0	0	0	0
2	Sean Chambers	9	2	0	2	0–0	0	0	0	0	1	0	0	0
30	Buck Coors	4	1	0	1	0–0	0	0	0	0	0	0	0	0
27	Ralph Fawaz	13	1	0	1	0–0	0	0	0	0	0	0	0	0
2	Cameron Murray	10	0	1	1	0–0	0	0	0	0	0	0	0	0
90	Gavin Meyer	6	1	0	1	0–0	0	0	0	0	0	0	0	0
59	Oluwaseyi Omotosho	3	0	1	1	0–0	0	0	0	0	0	0	0	0
73	Keegan Cryder	13	1	0	1	0–0	0	0	0	0	0	0	0	0
19	Ayden Eberhardt	8	1	0	1	0–0	0	0	0	0	0	0	0	0
	Total	13	548	306	854	57–251	24	10	39	22	6	5	1	0
	Opponents	13	501	328	829	57–222	22	12	37	10	6	9	0	0

Key: SOLO: Solo Tackles, AST: Assisted Tackles, TOT: Total Tackles, TFL: Tackles-for-loss, SACK: Quarterback Sacks, INT: Interceptions, BU: Passes Broken Up, QBH: Quarterback Hits, FF: Forced Fumbles, FR: Fumbles Recovered, BLK: Kicks or Punts Blocked, SAF: Safeties

Interceptions Statistics
NAME	NO.	YDS	AVG	TD	LNG
Chad Muma	3	68	22.7	2	45
Keyon Blankenbaker	1	50	50.0	1	50
Esaias Gandy	1	7	7.0	0	7
Victor Jones	1	3	3.0	0	3
Rome Weber	1	0	0.0	0	0
Miles Williams	1	10	10.0	0	10
Keonte Glinton	1	0	0.0	0	0
Isaac White	1	0	0.0	0	0
Totals	10	138	13.8	3	50

=== Special teams ===
Kicking statistics
NAME	XPM	XPA	XP%	FGM	FGA	FG%	1–19	20–29	30–39	40–49	50+	LNG	PTS
John Hoyland	40	40	100.0	10	14	71.4	0–0	7–7	2–2	1–3	0–2	44	70

Kick return statistics
NAME	RTNS	YDS	AVG	TD	LNG
Titus Swen	10	186	18.6	0	26
Cameron Stone	5	200	40.0	1	99
Rome Weber	2	45	22.5	0	38
Xazavian Valladay	1	0	0.0	0	0
Wyatt Wieland	1	23	23.0	0	23
Nick Miles	1	6	6.0	0	6
Totals	20	460	23.0	1	99

Punting statistics
NAME	PUNTS	YDS	AVG	LONG	TB	FC	I–20	50+	BLK
Ralph Fawaz	57	2,415	42.4	76	1	18	24	16	0

Punt return statistics
NAME	RTNS	YDS	AVG	TD	LONG
Ayden Eberhardt	11	37	3.4	0	12
Caleb Cooley	1	9	9.0	0	9
Totals	12	46	3.8	0	12

== Players drafted into the NFL ==
Round	Pick	Player	Position	NFL club
3	70	Chad Muma	LB	Jacksonville Jaguars
UDFA		Garrett Crall	DE	Miami Dolphins
UDFA		Keegan Cryder	C	Tampa Bay Buccaneers
UDFA		Logan Harris	G	Detroit Lions
UDFA		Trey Smith	RB	Jacksonville Jaguars
