= Repparfjorden =

Fjord in Norway

Coordinates: 70.50°N 24.17°E

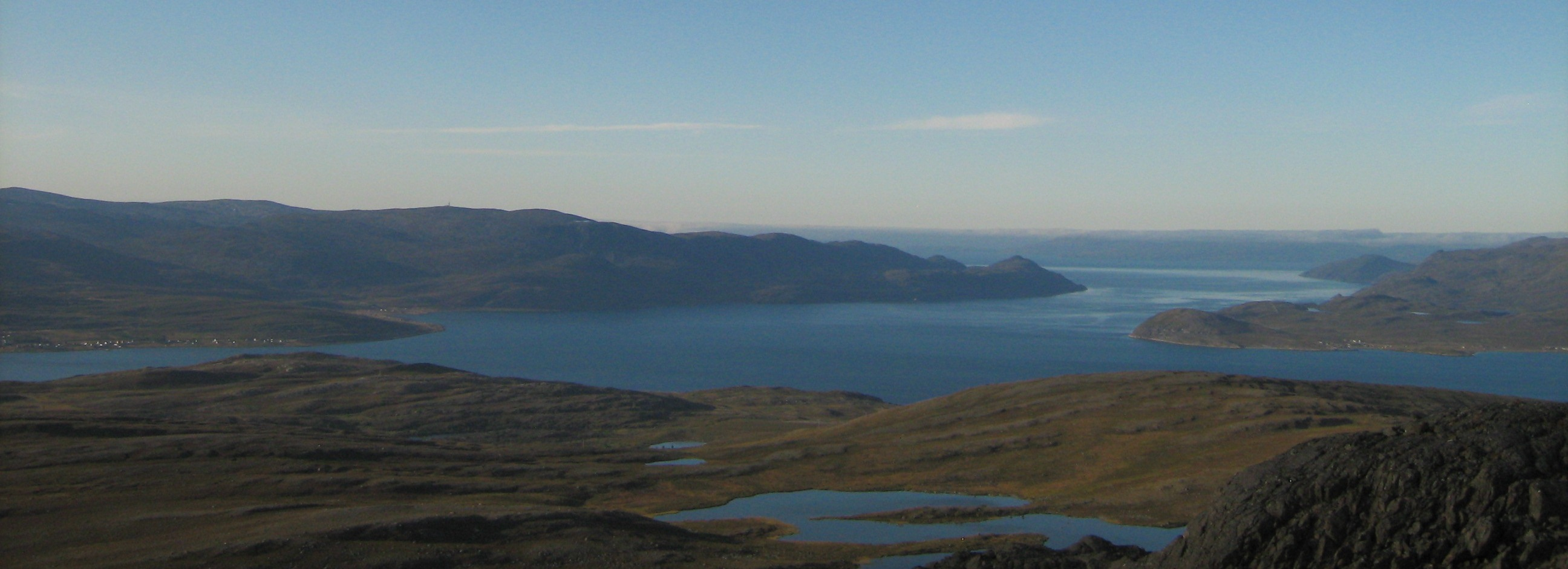
Panorama over the sounds Kvalsundet (Sámi: Fálesnuorri), Samuelsundet (Sámmolnuorri) and the fiord Repparfjorden (Riehppovuotna) in Finnmark.

Repparfjorden (Northern Sami: Riehpovuotna. Kven: Repovuono) is a fjord in Hammerfest Municipality in Finnmark county, Norway. It has a length of about 14 kilometres (8.7 mi), and cuts into Porsangerhalvøya from the west, southeast of the island of Kvaløya.

It is one of 29 fjords that the Storting has designated as a national salmon fjords.

Ocean dumping of mining waste, has not started (as of 2026). A copper mine is being built next to the fjord (as of Q4 2026). Its tunnel system reaches more than 800 m into the hillside. The copper is 1.7 km into the hillside. The copper mine project is Europe's northernmost. A mining conflict is ongoing.

== Geography ==
The fjord has an inlet between Tappen in the southwest and the village of Klubbukt (Klubbogohppi) in the northeast, and stretches southeast to Oldernes at the bottom of the fjord.

The fjord is 127 meters deep at its deepest point, located just inside the mouth in the middle of the fjord.

== Environmental issues ==
From 1972 to 1978, the fjord was used for the disposal of mining waste.

Repparfjorden has been studied for effects of sea disposal of mine tailings. Elevated levels of elements including lead, arsenic, chromium copper, selenium were found in haddock at the landfill. Further away from the test station, levels were lower. Reports indicate that the amounts of most elements were well below the limits at which they are safe to eat. The Norwegian Food Safety Authority has a general warning against eating liver from coastal fish, as lead was deposited into the liver of haddock.

Previous experiences with subsurface tailing deposits harmed ecosystems and the local economy.

Ocean dumping of mining waste, has not [re-started or] started (as of 2026).

== Repparfjorden conflict ==
"Organized resistance" against the mining project, has been going on for about two decades as of 2026.

On 14 April 2026, Norway's parliament is scheduled to vote about revoking Nussir's permit-for-emissions/discharge (or utslippstillatelse), according to a media outlet; as of Q2 2026, the mining company has permission to dump tailings into the fjord. Earlier (24 January 2026), news outlets said that within a week, 4 political parties will request that parliament votes on having the government recall the mining permit. Those parties are SV, Venstre, the Green Party, and Rødt.

The mining project goes against the Water Framework Directive; the EFTA Surveillance Authority opened its case against Norway in 2026. That regulatory agency "has issued a Formal Notice for the revocation of Nussir's PCA permit", according to a media outlet. Norway is supposed to follow laws that apply to the European Economic Area. Furthermore, indigenous rights under Free, Prior and Informed Consent (FPIC), are being violated by the government.

In November 2026, 23 activists lost their trial and a lower court in Finnmark handed down fines to all; the fines' sizes were Norwegian kroner 9600 and 14,400, except for a single fine of 18,000; in a previous trial (June 2026), 14 activists lost their trial and a lower court in Finnmark handed down fines to all; one fine's size was Norwegian kroner 19,000; the appellate court refused to hear that case, in September that year. C. 40 other people are charged and expected to stand trial in August and September 2026; Some individuals have been fined, repeatedly; One protester is a politician from Harstad, and his fines have a total of 50,000 to 80,000 Norwegian kroner, according to media.

In a verdict (March 2026) from an earlier trial, four activists that blockaded a ministry of the government, (and did not pay fines given by the police), had fines handed down by the lower court system (in Oslo). Those fines are between 9,600 and 11,600 Norwegian kroner and have been appealed. As of Q3 2025, less than 80 people have been fined.

There have been protests outside offices of Hartree Partners, in several countries; one round of protests started on 24 February 2026 outside the Oslo offices of Hartree Partners. The company is one of the largest investors of the mining company. A media outlet said on 26 February 2026, that Hartree Partners "does not answer emails, phone calls, or messages"; furthermore, "they do not answer journalists". Media has published pictures of 26 February protests outside Norway's embassy in Helsinki. There were also protests [at commercial property] in London and Genève with non-independent sources documenting them with photos. Furthermore, there were protests in Hamburg, Melbourne, and New York according to media. Oaktree Capital Management owns Hartree partners. Earlier (October 2025), there was a protest in London. The owner of the mining company "Nussir" is ACG Metals (as of Q4 2026), a company led (and partially owned) by Artem Volynets - a Russian-British linked to the oligarchs of Vladimir Putin. The owner of "Nussir" [has been] Blue Moon Metals and Hartree/Oaktree, however, ACG Metals has bought all of the stocks that Blue Moon Metals had in "Nussir".

Organizations that are opposing the ocean dumping, include Nature and Youth, and the Norwegian Society for the Conservation of Nature. The site is called "The Nussir mine", or Nussir-gruven

Protesters have been arrested by police (also prior to 2024), and blockades of construction machinery are events that have been compared to the Alta conflict. However, during the Alta conflict the government deployed 600 police officers to reinforce the local police that were trying to prevent acts of civil disobedience.

Protests at the construction site are ongoing as of January 2026.

Earlier (year 2021), the largest "copper contract" in Norwegian history, was cancelled; Aurubis no longer was the buyer (of the copper), in that mining project.

== See also ==
- The mining conflict at Førde Fjord
- Tailings under surface of ocean
