= PCA =

PCA may refer to:

== Medicine and biology ==
- Patient-controlled analgesia
- Patient care assistant/ Personal care assistant, also known as unlicensed assistive personnel
- Plate count agar in microbiology
- Polymerase cycling assembly, for large DNA oligonucleotides
- Posterior cerebral artery
- Posterior cortical atrophy, a form of dementia
- Prostate cancer
- Protein-fragment complementation assay, to identify protein–protein interactions
- Protocatechuic acid, a phenolic acid
- Procainamide

== Military and government ==
- EU–Armenia Partnership and Cooperation Agreement (PCA agreement between Armenia and the EU)
- Parks Canada Agency
- Partnership and Cooperation Agreement (EU)
- Permanent change of assignment in US armed forces

== Organizations ==
=== Business ===
- Packaging Corporation of America
- Peanut Corporation of America, former company
- Pennsylvania Central Airlines 1936-1948

=== Education ===
- Pacific Coast Academy, fictional school in TV series Zoey 101
- Parents and citizens associations for schools in Australia
- Paris College of Art
- Pensacola Christian Academy, Florida, US
- Peoples Christian Academy, Toronto, Ontario, Canada
- Pineywoods Community Academy, a charter school district in Lufkin, Texas
- Prestonwood Christian Academy, Plano, Texas
- Providence Christian Academy (disambiguation), for multiple schools

=== Games ===
- PokerStars Caribbean Adventure, European Poker Tour event
- Professional Chess Association, from 1993 to 1996

=== Political parties ===
- Parti Communiste Algérien (Algerian Communist Party)
- Partido Comunista de Andalucía (Communist Party of Andalusia)
- Partido Comunista de Aragón (Communist Party of Aragon)
- Partido Comunista de la Argentina (Communist Party of Argentina)

=== Religion ===
- Presbyterian Church of Africa
- Presbyterian Church in America
- Presbyterian Church of Australia

=== Sports ===
- Peace Curling Association, the regional governing body for the sport of curling in the Peace River region of Northern Alberta prior to 2018
- Philippine Columbian Association, club focusing in tennis in the Philippines
- Positive Coaching Alliance, US, provides sports training workshops
- Professional Cricketers' Association, England and Wales
- Punjab Cricket Association
- Punjab Cricket Association Stadium, Mohali, India

=== Other ===
- Permanent Court of Arbitration, The Hague, Netherlands
- Several Police complaints authorities
- POSC Caesar Association, a standardization organization
- Production Code Administration, a division of the Motion Picture Association
- Progressive Citizens of America
- Progressive Cultural Association, a British political music group

== Science and technology ==
- para-Chloroamphetamine or 4-Chloroamphetamine
- Principal component analysis, a statistical procedure
- Printed circuit assembly or printed circuit board
- Probabilistic cellular automaton (Math/Stochastic Processes)
- Protocatechuic acid, a polyphenol antioxidant
- Pyroglutamic acid, an amino acid derivative
- Partial combinatory algebra, an abstraction of a model of computation in mathematical logic

=== Computers ===
- Physical configuration audit, in configuration management
- Polymorphous Computer Architectures, a DARPA project; see Josep Torrellas

== Other uses ==
- People's Choice Awards, awards show where winners are voted on by the general public
- Personal carbon allowance, for carbon dioxide emissions
- Pete Crow-Armstrong, American baseball player
- Prompt Corrective Action, US banking law
