= Providence Christian School =

Providence Christian School may refer to:

- Providence Christian School, Stornoway, Isle of Lewis, Scotland
- Providence School, Jacksonville, Florida
- Providence Christian School, Brandon, Florida
- Providence Christian School (Oxford, Georgia)
- Providence Christian School (Kalamazoo), Michigan
- Providence Christian School (Charlotte), North Carolina
- Providence Hall Classical Christian School, Oklahoma City, Oklahoma
- Providence Christian School, Dothan, Alabama

== See also ==
- Providence High School (disambiguation)
- Providence Christian Academy (disambiguation)
