= Darius Muasau =

American football player (born 2001)

No. 54 – New England Patriots
- Position: Linebacker
- Roster status: Active

Personal information
- Born: February 10, 2001 (age 25); San Diego, California, U.S.
- Listed height: 6 ft 0 in (1.83 m)
- Listed weight: 234 lb (106 kg)

Career information
- High school: Mililani (Mililani, Hawaii)
- College: Hawaii (2019–2021); UCLA (2022–2023)
- NFL draft: 2024: 6th round, 183rd overall pick

Career history
- New York Giants (2024–2025); New England Patriots (2026–present)

Awards and highlights
- 2× First-team All-Mountain West (2020, 2021); Second-team All-Pac-12 (2023)

Career NFL statistics as of 2025
- Total tackles: 106
- Sacks: 1
- Interceptions: 1
- Pass deflections: 2
- Stats at Pro Football Reference

Darius Muasau (born February 10, 2001) is an American professional football linebacker for the New England Patriots of the National Football League (NFL). He played college football for the Hawaii Rainbow Warriors and UCLA Bruins.

== Early life ==
Muasau attended Mililani High School in Hawaii, where he was a linebacker and running back. As a senior, he was named to the USA Today All-USA Hawaii Football Second Team.

Muasau committed to playing college football at Hawaii in 2018, the lone Division I FBS offer he received.

== College career ==
=== Hawaii ===
==== 2019 ====
Muasau started the season as a backup linebacker and special teamer, but was thrust into action early in the season due to injuries to the Rainbow Warriors linebacking corps. In his first career start against rival Fresno State, Muasau led the team in total tackles and also recovered a key onside kick that set up the then-game tying drive for Hawaii.

==== 2020 ====
During his 2020 season, Muasau had the highest number of tackles on the Rainbow Warriors as well as ranking fourth in the nation at solo tackles and fifth in total tackles. He was also named the most outstanding player on defense of the 2020 New Mexico Bowl, compiling nine tackles, one sack and an interception in the performance.

Muasau was named an All-Mountain West first team selection in 2020, the only Hawaii player to garner first-team honors, as well as an honorable mention All-American by Phil Steele. He was also named a finalist for the Polynesian College Football Player of the Year Award, but ultimately lost out to Zach Wilson and Talanoa Hufanga.

==== 2021 ====
Muasau had another productive season in 2021, compiling 108 total tackles, seven sacks, and five forced fumbles. After the season concluded, Muasau announced on December 28, 2021 that he would be entering the transfer portal.

=== UCLA ===
On January 1, 2022, Muasau announced on social media that he would transfer to UCLA.

=== College statistics ===
Year	Class	GP	Tackles					Def Int			Fumbles
Year	Class	GP	Solo	Ast	Total	TFL	Sacks	INT	Yards	PD	FR
2019	Freshman	13	44	16	60	3.0	0.0	0	0	0	2
2020	Sophomore	9	66	36	102	9.5	4.5	1	1	1	0
2021	Junior	13	65	43	108	14	7	1	75	4	1
Career		35	175	95	270	26.5	11.5	2	76	5	3

== Professional career ==
Pre-draft measurables
Height	Weight	Arm length	Hand span	Wingspan	40-yard dash	10-yard split	20-yard split	20-yard shuttle	Three-cone drill	Vertical jump	Broad jump
5 ft 11 7/8 in (1.83 m)	225 lb (102 kg)	31 1/2 in (0.80 m)	9 1/2 in (0.24 m)	6 ft 2 3/4 in (1.90 m)	4.70 s	1.59 s	2.72 s	4.41 s	7.23 s	36.5 in (0.93 m)	9 ft 9 in (2.97 m)
All values from NFL Combine/Pro Day

=== New York Giants ===
Muasau was drafted by the New York Giants in the sixth round, 183rd overall, of the 2024 NFL draft. Muasau recorded an interception in his NFL debut against the Minnesota Vikings in Week 1. He made 15 appearances (seven starts) for New York during his rookie campaign, recording one interception, one pass deflection, and 55 combined tackles.

Muasau began the 2025 season as one of New York's starting linebackers. He was placed on injured reserve on November 8, 2025, due to an ankle injury suffered in Week 9 against the San Francisco 49ers. He was activated on December 13, ahead of the team's Week 15 matchup against the Washington Commanders.

On August 30, 2026, Muasau was waived by the Giants as a part of final roster cuts.

=== New England Patriots ===
On August 31, 2026, Muasau was claimed off of waivers by the New England Patriots.

== NFL career statistics ==
Legend
**Bold**	Career high

Year	Team	Games		Tackles					Interceptions						Fumbles				
Year	Team	GP	GS	Cmb	Solo	Ast	Sck	TFL	Int	Yds	Avg	Lng	TD	PD	FF	Fmb	FR	Yds	TD
2024	NYG	15	7	**55**	**26**	**29**	0.0	**3**	**1**	**1**	**1.0**	**1**	0	**1**	0	0	0	0	0
2025	NYG	12	11	51	24	27	**1.0**	2	0	0	0.0	0	0	**1**	0	0	0	0	0
Career		27	18	106	50	56	1.0	5	1	1	1.0	1	0	2	0	0	0	0	0

== Personal life ==
Muasau's younger brother Sergio is currently an offensive lineman at Hawaii.

== See also ==
- List of NCAA major college football yearly tackles leaders
