= Riley Wilson (American football) =

American football player (born 2002)

No. 53 – Arizona Cardinals
- Position: Linebacker
- Roster status: Practice squad

Personal information
- Born: May 30, 2002 (age 24); Prosper, Texas, U.S.
- Listed height: 6 ft 1 in (1.85 m)
- Listed weight: 226 lb (103 kg)

Career information
- High school: Prestonwood Christian (Plano, Texas)
- College: Hawaii (2021–2022); Montana (2023–2024); Arizona (2025)
- NFL draft: 2026: undrafted

Career history
- New England Patriots (2026)*; Arizona Cardinals (2026–present)*
- * Offseason or practice squad member only

Awards and highlights
- Second team All-Big Sky (2023)
- Stats at Pro Football Reference

William Riley Wilson III (born May 30, 2002) is an American professional football linebacker for the Arizona Cardinals of the National Football League (NFL). He played college football for the University of Hawai, University of Montana, and University of Arizona.

== Early life ==
Wilson was born on May 30, 2002, in Prosper, Texas. Wilson was a wide receiver and linebacker during his high school career at Prestonwood Christian in Plano, Texas. Eventually rated as a three-star recruit, he committed to Hawaii over offers from Indiana and Louisiana Tech. In three seasons as a Rainbow Warrior, he appeared in 16 games with one start; he transferred to Montana in January 2023. Wilson spent two seasons in Missoula, playing 23 games with 13 starts. Despite his uptick in opportunities and one-time recognition on the second All-Big Sky team, he entered the transfer portal again before his final year of college eligibility. This time, he took his talents to Arizona, where he added 11 more games as well as four starts. In total, Wilson played in 52 college games and finished with 193 total tackles, 16 sacks and two interceptions. Wilson transitioned from tight end to linebacker and played as a core special teamer.

== Professional career ==
Pre-draft measurables
Height	Weight	Arm length	Hand span	Wingspan	40-yard dash	10-yard split	20-yard split	20-yard shuttle	Three-cone drill	Vertical jump	Broad jump	Bench press
6 ft 1 3/8 in (1.86 m)	226 lb (103 kg)	30 1/2 in (0.77 m)	10 in (0.25 m)	6 ft 1 1/2 in (1.87 m)	4.58 s	1.66 s	2.65 s	4.46 s	7.07 s	33.5 in (0.85 m)	10 ft 0 in (3.05 m)	18 reps
All values from Pro Day

=== New England Patriots ===
On July 23, 2026, after going unselected in the 2026 NFL draft, Wilson signed with the New England Patriots as an undrafted free agent. Wilson was waived by New England on August 29 as a part of preliminary roster cuts; he was re–signed to the team's practice squad two days later. On September 29, Wilson was released.

=== Arizona Cardinals ===
On October 14, 2026, Wilson signed with the Arizona Cardinals practice squad.
