= Providence High School =

Providence High School may refer to:

- Providence High School (North Carolina), Charlotte, North Carolina
- Providence High School (Burbank, California)
- Providence High School (San Antonio), San Antonio, Texas
- Providence High School, Chicago, merged into Providence St. Mel School
- Providence School, Jacksonville, Florida
- Providence Catholic High School, New Lenox, Illinois
- Our Lady of Providence Junior-Senior High School, Clarksville, Indiana
- New Providence High School, New Providence, New Jersey
