= Providence Christian Academy =

Providence Christian Academy may refer to:

- Providence Christian Academy (Lilburn, Georgia), U.S.
- Providence Christian Academy (Murfreesboro, Tennessee), U.S.

== See also ==
- Providence Christian School (disambiguation)
