= Prestonwood Christian Academy =

Coordinates: 33.0296°N 96.8436°W

Location
- 6801 W. Park Blvd; Plano, Denton County, Texas 75093; United States

Information
- Type: Private, Christian
- Motto: "Ad majorem Dei gloriam" (For the Greater Glory of God)
- Religious affiliation: Protestant (Southern Baptist)
- Established: 1997
- Superintendent: Michael Goddard
- Teaching staff: 146.3 (FTE)
- Grades: PreK–12
- Enrollment: 1,393 (2019–20)
- Student to teacher ratio: 8.8
- Colors: Navy and Gold
- Nickname: Lions
- Website: Prestonwood Christian Academy

Prestonwood Christian Academy (PCA) is a private Christian School that serves more than 1,600 students enrolled at three campuses: PCA Plano in Plano (Pre-Kindergarten 3 through 12th grade), PCA North in Prosper (Pre-Kindergarten 3 through 12th grade) for school year 2026-2027, and pre-kindergarten - 6th grade for 2027 forward, and the PCA Online virtual academy.

It is affiliated with Prestonwood Baptist Church and is accredited by the Association of Christian Schools International. In addition to a spiritual development plan, the school implements a liberal arts academic program.

PCA is both the name of the main campuses and the overall school system which it operates. In addition to PCA Plano, PCA North, and PCAplus, the system also includes St. Timothy Christian Academy, a K-12 school for students with learning challenges (St. Timothy is located at the Plano campus),

== Athletics ==
Prestonwood Christian Academy competes in the 6A classification (in football, 11-Man Division I) of the Texas Association of Private and Parochial Schools (TAPPS).

Volleyball, basketball, baseball and golf are also played by students at the school.

State Championships

Baseball

- TAPPS 6A Division 1 State Champions (2025-26)
- TAPPS 6A State Champions (2021-22)
- TAPPS 6A State Champions (2015-16)

Volleyball

- TAPPS 6A State Champions (2024-25)
- TAPPS 6A State Champions (2023-24)
- TAPPS 6A State Champions (2022-23)
- TAPPS 6A State Champions (2018-19)
- TAPPS 6A State Champions (2005-06)
- TAPPS 6A State Champions (2004-05)
- TAPPS 6A State Champions (2003-04)

Girls Basketball

- TAPPS 6A State Champions (2024-25)
- TAPPS 6A State Champions (2013-14)

Track & Field

- Boys 4x100 Relay - 1st Place State Champions (2023-24)

Boys Basketball

- TAPPS 6A State Champions (2022-23)
- TAPPS 6A State Champions (2016-17)
- TAPPS 6A State Champions (2015-16)
- TAPPS 6A State Champions (2014-15)
- TAPPS 6A State Champions (2013-14)
- TAPPS 6A State Champions (2012-13)
- TAPPS 6A State Champions (2010-11)
- TAPPS 6A State Champions (2009-10)

Boys Soccer

- TAPPS 6A State Champions (2022-23)
- TAPPS 6A State Champions (2009-10)

Girls Soccer

- TAPPS 6A State Champions (2004-05)

Football

- TAPPS 6A State Champions (2017-18)
- TAPPS 6A State Champions (2015-16)
- TAPPS 6A State Champions (2010-11)
- TAPPS 6A State Champions (2009-10)
- TAPPS 6A State Champions (2005-06)

Competitive Cheer

- NCA National Champions (2021-22)
- NCA Grand Champions (2021-22)
- NCA National Champions (2020-21)
- NCA National Champions (2019-20)
- NCA National Champions (2018-19)
- NCA National Champions (2016-17)
- NCA National Champions (2015-16)
- NCA National Champions (2014-15)
- NCA National Champions (2012-13)
- NCA National Champions (2010-11)
- NCA National Champions (2009-10)
- NCA National Champions (2006-07)
- NCA National Champions (2003-04)
- NCA National Champions (2000-01)

Boys Golf

- TAPPS 6A State Champions (2015-16)
- TAPPS 6A State Champions (2014-15)

Girls Golf

- TAPPS 6A State Champions (2015-16)

== Notable alumni ==
- Anne Winters— Emmy Award Winning actress
- Cameron Rupp — American professional baseball catcher in the Oakland Athletics organization
- Cole Missimo— former midfielder for Philadelphia Union
- Julius Randle— basketball player for the Minnesota Timberwolves
- J. R. Reed— American football safety
- Matt Constant — Soccer Center Back for Michigan Stars FC
- Riley Wilson — NFL linebacker for the Arizona Cardinals
- Xavier Mitchell — American professional baseball pitcher in the Los Angeles Angels organization.
