= Calvin Turner =

American gridiron football player (born 1999)

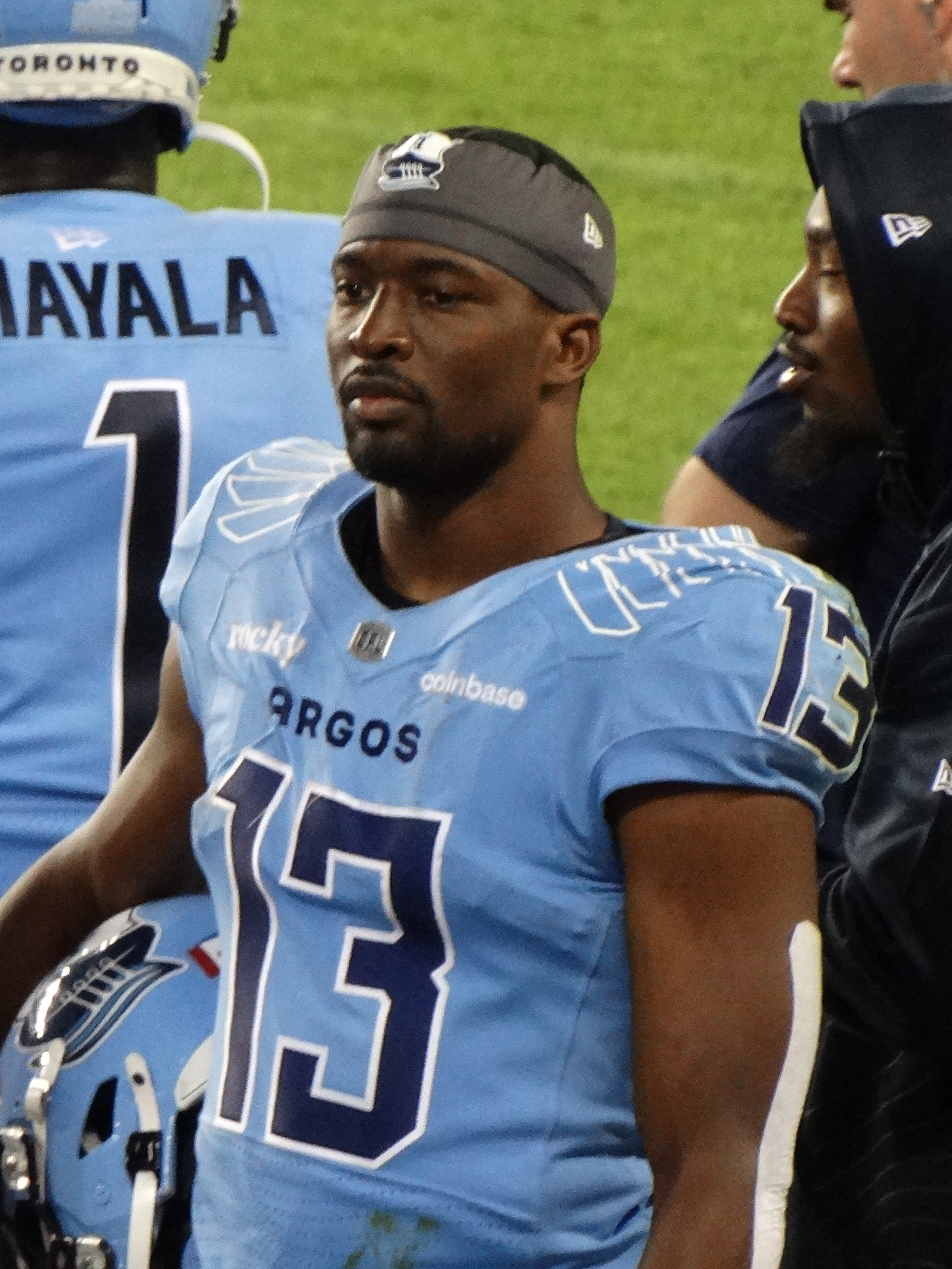
- Turner with the Toronto Argonauts in 2025

Profile
- Position: Wide receiver

Personal information
- Born: July 5, 1999 (age 27); Savannah, Georgia, U.S.
- Listed height: 5 ft 11 in (1.80 m)
- Listed weight: 198 lb (90 kg)

Career information
- High school: New Hampstead (GA)
- College: Jacksonville (2017–2019); Hawaii (2020–2021)
- NFL draft: 2022: undrafted

Career history
- San Antonio Brahmas (2023–2024); Toronto Argonauts (2025)

Awards and highlights
- 2× Second-team All-Mountain West (2020, 2021); First-team All-Pioneer Football League (2019)
- Stats at CFL.ca

Calvin Turner Jr. (born July 5, 1999) is an American professional football running back and wide receiver. He most recently played for the Toronto Argonauts of the Canadian Football League (CFL). He played college football at Jacksonville University until the program shut down in 2019. He also played for the University of Hawaii from 2020 to 2021. Turner took snaps at defensive back, quarterback, running back, and wide receiver during his college career.

== Early life ==
Turner attended New Hampstead High School in Bloomingdale, Georgia, where he was a four-sport athlete, playing football, basketball, baseball, as well as running track. As a high school senior, he was a dual-threat quarterback who rushed for over 1,700 yards and 15 touchdowns, while also passing for 1,450 yards and 10 touchdowns en route to being named the Savannah Morning News' Most Versatile Male Athlete in 2017.

== College career ==
=== Jacksonville ===
As a true freshman, Turner's coaches transitioned him to a defensive back and return specialist to get him playing time. Turner led the team in total pass breakups, was fifth on the team in tackles, and garnered an All-Pioneer Football League honorable mention after the season.

Turner transitioned back to quarterback before the 2018 season, and was named the starting quarterback. In an option offense, he set program records in single-season rushing touchdowns and was 36 yards away from breaking the single-season rushing yards record before he broke his leg in the season finale against Dayton. He was named an honorable mention to the All-Pioneer Football League at the end of the season.

Turner rushed for over 1,300 yards and 15 touchdowns in 2019 while also being named to the All-Pioneer Football League First Team as an all-purpose player.

When the program folded in 2019, Turner announced he would transfer to Hawaii for his final season of eligibility.

=== Hawaii ===
As a quarterback in an option offense at Jacksonville, Turner transitioned into a running back at Hawaii, later seeing time at wide receiver as well as fielding kicks. In his debut with the Rainbow Warriors, Turner scored two touchdowns on eight carries for 61 yards against Fresno State. He also had a three-touchdown performance in a loss against Boise State, which put him as the team leader in total touchdowns with seven.

In the Rainbow Warriors' bowl game against Houston in the New Mexico Bowl, Turner had 252 all-purpose yards highlighted by a 75-yard touchdown reception and a New Mexico Bowl record 92-yard kickoff return in the victory. Turner was named the game's most outstanding player on offense for his efforts.

Turner was named to the All-Mountain West second team at the end of the season as a wide receiver and was also named an honorable mention All-American by Phil Steele.

With the NCAA approving a waiver that allowed their 2020 class standing to be retained in 2021 in response to the COVID-19 pandemic, Turner announced he would return to Hawaii for the 2021 season rather than entering his name in the upcoming NFL draft.

== Professional career ==
=== San Antonio Brahmas ===
On November 17, 2022, Turner was drafted by the San Antonio Brahmas of the XFL. He was activated from the team's reserve list on March 21, 2023, and placed on the list again on March 31. He re-signed with the team on December 18, 2023. He was waived on March 22, 2024. He was re-signed on April 10, 2024. He was waived on August 23, 2024.

=== Toronto Argonauts ===
On January 17, 2025, Turner signed with the Toronto Argonauts of the CFL. He played in two games where he recorded 10 kickoff returns for 232 yards and eight punt returns for 66 yards before being released on June 27, 2025.
