= 2021 Colorado State Rams football team =

American college football season

2021 Colorado State Rams football
- Conference: Mountain West Conference
- Mountain Division
- Record: 3–9 (2–6 MW)
- Head coach: Steve Addazio (2nd season)
- Offensive coordinator: Jon Budmayr (1st season)
- Offensive scheme: Pro spread
- Defensive coordinator: Chuck Heater (4th season)
- Base defense: 4–3
- Home stadium: Canvas Stadium

Uniform
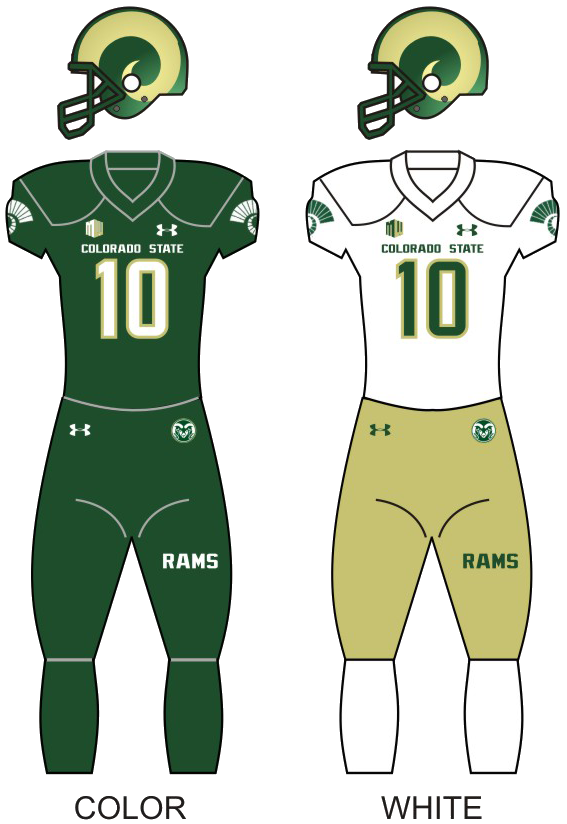

2021 Mountain West Conference football standings
	Conf.			Overall
Team	W		L	W		L
Mountain Division
No. 24 Utah State xy$	6	–	2	11	–	3
Air Force x	6	–	2	10	–	3
Boise State	5	–	3	7	–	5
Wyoming	2	–	6	7	–	6
Colorado State	2	–	6	3	–	9
New Mexico	1	–	7	3	–	9
West Division
No. 25 San Diego State xy	7	–	1	12	–	2
Fresno State	6	–	2	10	–	3
Nevada	5	–	3	8	–	5
Hawaii	3	–	5	6	–	7
San Jose State	3	–	5	5	–	7
UNLV	2	–	6	2	–	10
Championship: Utah State 46, San Diego State 13
$ – Conference champion; x – Division champion/co-champions; y – Championship game participant; Rankings from AP Poll

The 2021 Colorado State Rams football team represented Colorado State University in the 2021 NCAA Division I FBS football season. The Rams were led by second–year head coach Steve Addazio and played their home games at Sonny Lubick Field at Canvas Stadium in Fort Collins, Colorado, as members of the Mountain Division of the Mountain West Conference.

== Preseason ==
In the preseason Mountain West media poll that was released on July 21, 2021, the Rams were picked to finish fourth in the Mountain Division behind Boise State, Wyoming, and Air Force. Defensive lineman Scott Patchan and punter Ryan Stonehouse were named to the Mountain West Football Preseason All-Conference Team.

=== Incoming transfers ===
Colorado State added nine transfers prior to the 2021 season, per the Coloradoan.

Position	Name	Year	High School	Hometown	Previous School
QB	Matt Valecce	Rd. Junior	Fordham Prep	Mamaroneck, NY	Boston College
RB	David Bailey	Senior	North Caroline	Ridgely, MD	Boston College
WR	Keenan Brown	Rd. Sophomore	Dakota Ridge	Littleton, CO	Fond du Lac TCC
WR	Jordan Kress	Grad. Student	Mountain View	Loveland, CO	New Mexico
OL	Vincent Picozzi	Grad. Student	Lansdale Catholic	Collegeville, PA	Temple
DL	Mike Ciaffoni	Rd. Sophomore	Lincoln-Sudbury	Sudbury, MA	Boston College
LB	Anthony Koclanakis	Grad. Student	Esperanza	Yorba Linda, CA	Murray State
DB	Linwood Crump	Grad. Student	Piscataway	South Amboy, NJ	Temple
DB	Titus Jones	Rd. Sophomore	Woodland	Kingston, GA	Alabama A&M

=== Recruiting class of 2021 ===
Colorado State football signed 19 recruits as part of their 2021 signing class, per 247Sports.com.

Star ratings vary by recruiting service; star ratings below are 247Sports Composite ratings, a composite average of ratings across major recruiting services provided by 247Sports.com.

Position	Name	High School	Hometown	Star Rating	Rating*	Other Offers	Commitment Date
QB	Chance Harris †	Clovis	Clovis, NM		0.8173	New Mexico	May 18, 2020
QB	Luke McAllister †	Palmer Ridge	Monument, CO		0.8376	None	November 20, 2019
QB	Evan Olaes	Legacy	North Las Vegas, NV		0.8053	Air Force, Army, Idaho, Montana St., New Mexico, Northern Arizona, Yale	June 8, 2020
RB	Alex Berrouet	Acton-Boxborough	Acton, MA		0.7965	Fordham, Holy Cross	December 16, 2020
WR	Damir Abdullah	Charter Oak	Covina, CA		0.8281	Cal Poly, Fresno St., Hawaii, New Mexico, San Jose St.	June 14, 2020
WR	Gerick Robinson	Centennial	Las Vegas, NV		0.8065	Idaho, San Diego State	May 11, 2020
TE/LB	Tanner Arkin	Fossil Ridge	Fort Collins, CO		0.8153	Penn, Wyoming	May 12, 2020
TE	Drake Martinez	St. Thomas	Cypress, TX		0.8269	South Florida	April 26, 2020
OL	Justin Michael	Poudre	Fort Collins, CO		0.8281	Dartmouth, Harvard, Hawaii, Kansas St., Montana St., Nevada, Yale	May 8, 2020
OL	George Miki-Han	Mater Dei	Santa Ana, CA		0.8322	Bowling Green, Morgan State	April 30, 2020
DL	Grady Kelly	Navarre	Navarre, FL		0.8227	Cornell, Rice, Samford	May 12, 2020
DL	Clay Nanke	Regis Jesuit	Denver, CO		0.8113	Iowa State, Nevada, New Mexico, Northern Colorado, Wyoming	December 16, 2020
DL	Tyler Quinn	Duncanville	Duncanville, TX		0.8390	Abilene Christian, Air Force, Alabama A&M, Army, Cornell, Fordham, Georgetown, Hawaii, Houston Baptist, Incarnate Word, Navy, Northern Arizona, Texas Southern, Texas St., Toledo, UNLV	June 4, 2020
DL	Mukendi Wa-Kalonji	Grandview	Aurora, CO		0.8173	Nevada	June 2, 2020
LB	Malakai Grant	Flagler Palm Coast	Palm Coast, FL		0.8058	Austin Peay, South Alabama, UMass	December 16, 2020
DB	Lathan Adams †	DeSoto	Waxahachie, TX		0.8431	Arkansas St., Hawaii, Illinois St., Kansas, McNeese St., Missouri St., SMU, Toledo, UNLV	April 13, 2020
DB	Jack Howell	Hamilton	Chandler, AZ		0.8118	New Mexico, New Mexico St., Northern Arizona	June 15, 2020
DB	Langston Williams	Eaglecrest	Aurora, CO		0.8173	Army, Wyoming	May 4, 2020
DB	Branden Coleman	Columbus	Miami, FL		0.8357	Army, Dartmouth, FIU, UCF	December 16, 2020

*= 247Sports Composite rating; ratings are out of 1.00. (five stars= 1.00–.98, four stars= .97–.90, three stars= .80–.89, two stars= .79–.70, no stars= <70)
†= Left the Colorado State program following signing but prior to the 2021 season.

The large recruiting class included six recruits from Colorado, three from both Texas and Florida, two from California and Nevada, and one from New Mexico, Massachusetts, and Arizona. One of the class's highest rated recruits, defensive back Branden Coleman, was a last-minute signing as he was previously committed to UCF and had not publicly shown interest towards Colorado State.

== Staff ==
=== Coaching changes ===
- Offensive coordinator: Former offensive coordinator Joey Lynch left Colorado State to join Vanderbilt's coaching staff as their pass game coordinator and quarterbacks coach in January 2021. He was replaced by Wisconsin quarterbacks coach Jon Budmayr on February 4, 2021.
- Wide receivers coach: Former wide receivers coach Kenny Guiton was hired by Arkansas to be their next wide receivers coach in January 2021. He was replaced by Ball State wide receivers coach Alex Bailey on February 2, 2021.

=== 2021 coaching staff ===
Name	Position	Consecutive season at Colorado State in current position
Steve Addazio	Head coach	2nd
Jon Budmayr	Offensive coordinator/quarterbacks coach	1st
Chuck Heater	Defensive coordinator/safeties coach	2nd
Antoine Smith	Assistant head coach/defensive line coach	2nd
Louie Addazio	Offensive line coach	2nd
Brian White	Running backs coach	2nd
Alex Bailey	Wide receivers coach	1st
Cody Booth	Tight ends coach	2nd
Sean Cronin	Linebackers coach	2nd
Kap Dede	Outside Linebackers/nickelbacks coach	2nd
Anthony Perkins	Cornerbacks coach	3rd
Scott McLafferty	Head strength and conditioning coach	2nd

== Roster ==
2021 Colorado State Rams Football Roster
Quarterbacks: 4 Matt Valecce – Rs. Junior (Mamaroneck, NY); 7 Todd Centeio – Rs. Senior (West Palm Beach, FL); 12 Giles Pooler – Freshman (Louisville, KY); 15 Jonah O'Brien – Rs. Sophomore (Bartlett, IL); 17 Evan Olaes – Freshman (North Las Vegas, NV); Running backs: 1 A'Jon Vivens – Rs. Junior (Denver, CO); 5 David Bailey – Senior (Ridgely, MD); 27 Jaylen Thomas – Rs. Sophomore (Colorado Springs, CO); 28 Christian Hunter – Junior (Fontana, CA); 29 Alex Berrouet – Freshman (Acton, MA); 36 Kory Tacha – Freshman (Limon, CO); 37 Blake Beecher – Rs. Sophomore (Norco, CA); 38 Mason Veve – Freshman (Erie, CO); 47 David Aggrey – Rs. Junior (Bronx, NY); Fullback: 49 Cade Plath – Rs. Sophomore (Chanhassen, MN); Wide receivers: 2 Justice McCoy – Rs. Senior (New Orleans, LA); 3 E.J. Scott – Rs. Senior (Atlanta, GA); 6 Ty McCullouch – Junior (Moreno Valley, CA); 10 Jordan Kress – Grad. Student (Loveland, CO); 18 Thomas Pannunzio – Senior (Pueblo, CO); 22 Dante Wright – Junior (Navarre, FL); 24 Kyjuan Herndon – Rs. Freshman (Jacksonville, FL); 26 Logan Ludwig – Rs. Junior (Roxborough Park, CO); 39 Keenan Brown – Rs. Sophomore (Littleton, CO); 40 Dawson Menegatti – Rs. Freshman (Pueblo West, CO); 43 Jaseim Mitchell – Freshman (Colorado Springs, CO); 80 Damir Abdullah – Freshman (West Covina, CA); 81 Dane Olson – Rs. Sophomore (San Diego, CA); 83 Chris McEahern – Rs. Sophomore (Arvada, CO); 86 Gerick Robinson – Freshman (Las Vegas, NV); Tight ends: 16 Cam Butler – Grad. Student (Columbia, SC); 41 Tanner Arkin – Freshman (Fort Collins, CO); 44 Nick Picozzi – Rs. Junior (Collegeville, PA); 82 Dylan Walker – Rs. Freshman (Douglassville, PA); 84 Gary Williams – Rs. Junior (Charlotte, NC); 85 Trey McBride – Senior (Fort Morgan, CO); 87 Drake Martinez – Freshman (Cypress, TX); 88 Brian Polendey – Rs. Senior (Denton, TX)	Offensive linemen: 50 Owen Snively – Rs. Freshman (Fremont, NH); 51 Justin Michael – Freshman (Fort Collins, CO); 52 Adam Korutz – Grad. Student (Johnson City, NY); 53 Elijah Johnson – Rs. Senior (Severn, MD); 55 Cam Reddy – Rs. Junior (Franklin, MA); 56 Ches Jackson – Rs. Junior (Tifton, GA); 58 George Miki-Han – Freshman (Irvine, CA); 59 Grant Stewartson – Rs. Freshman (Castle Pines, CO); 60 Cole Feinauer – Freshman (Cheshire, CT); 61 Sammy Norris – Freshman (Las Vegas, NV); 63 Alex Azusenis – Rs. Sophomore (Powell, OH); 65 Tautai Li'o Marks – Rs. Freshman (Santa Ana, CA); 69 Barry Wesley – Rs. Senior (Morrison, CO); 70 Joctavis Phillips – Rs. Senior (West Monroe, LA); 71 Brian Crespo-Jaquez – Rs. Freshman (Fort Collins, CO); 72 Dirk Nelson – Rs. Freshman (Visalia, CA); 73 Gage Gaynor – Sophomore (Parkland, FL); 76 Vincent Picozzi – Grad. Student (Collegeville, PA); 77 Keith Williams – Grad. Student (Baltimore, MD); 79 Tex Elliott – Rs. Freshman (Indianapolis, IN); Defensive linemen: 0 Toby McBride – Grad. Student (Fort Morgan, CO); 1 Scott Patchan – Grad. Student (Tampa, FL); 33 Manny Jones – Grad. Student (Cartersville, GA); 50 Cian Quiroga – Rs. Sophomore (Denver, CO); 54 Mike Ciaffoni – Rs. Sophomore (Sudbury, MA); 68 Cam Bariteau – Sophomore (Wareham, MA); 90 Grady Kelly – Freshman (Navarre, FL); 91 James Mitchell – Sophomore (Duncanville, TX); 92 Mukendi Wa-Kalonji – Freshman (Aurora, CO); 94 Devin Phillips – Senior (Monroe, LA); 95 Tyler Quinn – Freshman (Desoto, TX); 97 Clay Nanke – Freshman (Denver, CO); Long snappers: 46 Cody Pettitt – Freshman (Fort Collins, CO); 86 Ross Reiter – Senior (Phoenix, AZ); Placekickers: 35 Joe DeLine – Grad. Student (Steamboat Springs, CO); 93 Jonathan Terry – Rs. Junior (Castle Rock, CO); 95 Cayden Camper – Junior (Pueblo, CO); Punters: 41 Ryan Stonehouse – Grad. Student (La Verne, CA)	Linebackers: 5 Dequan Jackson – Senior (Jacksonville, FL); 12 Cam'Ron Carter – Senior (Tucker, GA); 13 Bam Amina – Sophomore (Waianae, HI); 15 Brandon Hickerson-Rooks – Rs. Senior (Harrisburg, PA); 30 Chase Wilson – Sophomore (Arvada, CO); 35 Aaron Moore – Sophomore (Oakland, TN); 36 Payton Polson – Rs. Sophomore (Highlands Ranch, CO); 39 Sanjay Strickland – Sophomore (Arvada, CO); 42 Mohamed Kamara – Junior (Newark, NJ); 43 Troy Golden – Rs. Junior (Orlando, FL); 45 Malakai Grant – Freshman (Palm Coast, FL); 46 Devon Edwards – Rs. Freshman (Mead, CO); 47 Anthony Koclanakis – Grad. Student (Yorba Linda, CA); 49 Drew Kulick – Freshman (Aurora, CO); 55 Tavian Brown – Rs. Sophomore (Demopolis, AL); 57 Elijah Jackson – Freshman (Hyrum, UT); Defensive backs: 4 Rashad Ajayi – Senior (Atlanta, GA); 7 Linwood Crump – Grad. Student (South Amboy, NJ); 8 Tywan Francis – Senior (New Orleans, LA); 9 Logan Stewart – Grad. Student (Loveland, CO); 11 Henry Blackburn – Sophomore (Boulder, CO); 14 Brandon Guzman – Rs. Freshman (Pasadena, CA); 17 Jack Howell – Freshman (Chandler, AZ); 19 Branden Coleman – Rs. Freshman (Miami, FL); 20 Langston Williams – Freshman (Aurora, CO); 23 Mikell Harvey – Rs. Junior (Slidell, LA); 24 Duante Davis – Freshman (Windsor, CO); 25 Robert Floyd – Freshman (Pompano Beach, FL); 26 Marshaun Cameron – Grad. Student (Los Angeles, CA); 32 Liam Huber – Freshman (Erie, CO); 34 Titus Jones – Rs. Sophomore (Kingston, GA); 38 Griffin Vander Waerdt – Rs. Freshman (Parker, CO)

Rs.= Redshirted in a previous season.
2021 Colorado State Football Roster

Pipeline states
States with five or more recruits on the 2021 roster:

- Colorado (36 recruits)
- California (12 recruits)
- Florida (11 recruits)
- Georgia (6 recruits)
- Louisiana (5 recruits)

== Schedule ==
Date	Time	Opponent	Site	TV	Result	Attendance
September 3	7:00 p.m.	No. 3 (FCS) South Dakota State*	Canvas Stadium; Fort Collins, CO	FS1	L 23–42	32,327
September 11	8:00 p.m.	Vanderbilt*	Canvas Stadium; Fort Collins, CO	CBSSN	L 21–24	27,233
September 18	2:00 p.m.	at Toledo*	Glass Bowl; Toledo, OH	ESPNU	W 22–6	21,365
September 25	1:30 p.m.	at No. 5 Iowa*	Kinnick Stadium; Iowa City, IA	FS1	L 14–24	65,456
October 9	1:30 p.m.	San José State^{†}	Canvas Stadium; Fort Collins, CO	FS1	W 32–14	34,780
October 16	5:00 p.m.	at New Mexico	University Stadium; Albuquerque, NM	Stadium	W 36–7	15,403
October 22	7:30 p.m.	at Utah State	Maverik Stadium; Logan, UT	CBSSN	L 24–26	21,423
October 30	5:00 p.m.	Boise State	Canvas Stadium; Fort Collins, CO	CBSSN	L 19–28	25,221
November 6	1:30 p.m.	at Wyoming	War Memorial Stadium; Laramie, WY (Border War / Bronze Boot)	CBSSN	L 17–31	24,926
November 13	5:00 p.m.	Air Force	Canvas Stadium; Fort Collins, CO (Ram–Falcon Trophy)	CBSSN	L 21–35	25,550
November 20	9:00 p.m.	at Hawaii	Clarence T. C. Ching Athletics Complex; Honolulu, HI	Spectrum Sports	L 45–50	6,575
November 27	7:00 p.m.	Nevada	Canvas Stadium; Fort Collins, CO	CBSSN	L 10–52	17,465
*Non-conference game; ^{†}Homecoming; Rankings from AP Poll (and CFP Rankings, after November 2) - Released prior to game; All times are in Mountain time

Results gathered from CSU and ESPN.

== Game summaries ==
=== No. 3 (FCS) South Dakota State ===
	1	2	3	4	Total
Jackrabbits	7	14	14	7	42
Rams	0	10	0	13	23

650 days after fans had last been present in Canvas Stadium, the Rams opened the 2021 football season on September 3, 2021, against the South Dakota State Jackrabbits in front of a crowd of 32,327. The game, which was scheduled to begin at 7:00 pm Mountain Time, was delayed by 45 minutes due to rain and lightning. An eager crowd, especially in the student section, ignored requests to vacate the stadium and shelter from the storm.

The game began slowly for both teams and the game remained scoreless until 2:22 in the first quarter, when South Dakota State running back Pierre Strong Jr. recorded a 48-yard touchdown run. CSU answered with a touchdown from running back David Bailey before the Jackrabbits pulled away, scoring two more touchdowns before halftime. The Rams trailed 21–10 at halftime, and by the end of the third quarter, South Dakota State's lead was up to 35–10. The Rams scored two touchdowns (one with a failed two-point conversion) in the fourth quarter, but the Jackrabbits' lead was already too large. South Dakota State won 42-23 and the Rams fell to 0–1 on the season.

Despite the score difference, the two teams recorded nearly identical total yardage and time of possession, with South Dakota State recording just four more yards and possessing the ball for only 54 more seconds than CSU. Colorado State's quarterback Todd Centeio recorded 29 completions on 42 attempts for 304 passing yards. Running back David Bailey led the team's rushing stats with 19 carries for 46 yards and a rushing touchdown (as well as a receiving touchdown), and tight end Trey McBride led the team's receiving stats with 13 receptions for 116 yards.

=== Vanderbilt ===
	1	2	3	4	Total
Commodores	0	7	14	3	24
Rams	7	7	0	7	21

After a disappointing opening week loss to FCS South Dakota State, the Rams hosted Vanderbilt, a fellow FBS team that lost to FCS East Tennessee State the previous week. The game kicked off at 8:00 pm Mountain Time on September 11, 2021.

Colorado State started hot, scoring a touchdown on their first drive to go up 7–0. Neither team scored for the remainder of the first quarter, and the game remained scoreless until the 14:08 mark of the second quarter, when CSU running back David Bailey scored a 20-yard rushing touchdown to make the game 14–0. Right before halftime, Vanderbilt scored a quick touchdown to make the score 14–7 at half. Vanderbilt would hold on to their momentum, scoring an unanswered 14 points in the third quarter to make the game 21–14 at the end of the third quarter. CSU tied the game at 21 at the 3:07 mark of the fourth quarter on a touchdown reception by tight end Trey McBride, but Vanderbilt responded with a game-winning 38-yard field goal with 19 seconds remaining in the game. Vanderbilt won 24-21 and the Rams fell to 0–2 on a second consecutive embarrassing home loss.

Colorado State recorded 445 yards of offense compared to Vanderbilt's 342 yards, but Vanderbilt dominated time of possession, holding the ball for nearly 11 minutes more than the Rams. Quarterback Todd Centeio completed 20 passes on 38 attempts for 238 passing yards, two passing touchdowns and an interception, as well as 75 rushing yards on 11 carries. Running back David Bailey led the team's rushing stats with 15 carries for 80 yards and a rushing touchdown (as well as a receiving touchdown for the second consecutive game). Tight end Trey McBride led the team's receiving stats with eight receptions for 114 yards and a touchdown.

=== Toledo ===
	1	2	3	4	Total
Rams	3	0	10	9	22
Rockets	0	3	3	0	6

On September 18, 2021, the Rams went on the road for the first time of the 2021 season and traveled to the Toledo Rockets' Glass Bowl for a Saturday afternoon game. The Rockets were 1-1 entering the game, having beaten Norfolk State and narrowly losing to Notre Dame.

The game was a defensive battle with no offensive touchdowns scored by either team the entire game. At halftime, the score was 3-3, with the sole CSU score being a 31-yard field goal by kicker Cayden Camper. The only touchdown of the game came at the 3:03 mark of the third quarter, when Colorado State punt returner Thomas Pannunzio returned a punt for a 70-yard touchdown. Kicker Cayden Camper made five field goals on five attempts throughout the game to lead the Rams to their first win of the season, beating Toledo 22–6.

The beginning of a trend of settling for field goals after failing to complete drives was displayed in this game, as CSU's only offensive scores came on five Cayden Camper field goals. Quarterback Todd Centeio had only 11 completions on 27 throws for 110 yards, with 109 of those yards going to tight end Trey McBride, who led the team in receiving. Running back David Bailey had his first 100-yard rushing game of the season, recording 132 yards on 30 carries.

=== No. 5 Iowa ===
	1	2	3	4	Total
Rams	0	14	0	0	14
Hawkeyes	0	7	14	3	24

The 1-2 Rams traveled to Iowa City, Iowa to take on the undefeated, AP ranked no. 5 Iowa Hawkeyes on September 25, 2021.

Much like the Rams' previous game, this was another defensive battle between two hot defensive teams. The first quarter went scoreless, but the second quarter began with Iowa topping off a five play, 87-yard drive with a touchdown. CSU responded with a touchdown of their own at the 3:55 mark of the second quarter that came on a 10-yard run by quarterback Todd Centeio. On Iowa's following drive, Colorado State defensive back Robert Floyd picked off Iowa quarterback Spencer Petras and returned the ball 62 yards deep into Iowa territory. This interception set the Rams up for a quick touchdown drive before half and to everyone's surprise, Colorado State led Iowa 14–7 at halftime. Midway through the third quarter, Rams' running back A'Jon Vivens fumbled on his own six-yard line, setting Iowa up for an easy, one play touchdown drive that tied the game at 14. Colorado State went scoreless in the second half, and the Hawkeyes scored an unanswered 17 points to win the game, 24–14.

The Rams fell to 1–3 on the season with this loss, but spirits remained high as a result of the team's impressive performance. Iowa recorded just 28 more yards of offense than CSU, and both teams recorded the same number of first downs (12) throughout the game. In a game dominated by defense, quarterback Todd Centeio went 16/30 for 155 yards, a passing touchdown and a rushing touchdown. Centeio and running back A'Jon Vivens combined for 34 carries for just 64 rushing yards, and tight end Trey McBride led the Rams in receiving for the fourth consecutive week, recording six receptions for 59 yards.

=== San Jose State ===
	1	2	3	4	Total
Spartans	0	7	0	7	14
Rams	10	6	10	6	32

Coming off of a strong showing against Iowa, 1-3 Colorado State hosted 2020 Mountain West Conference champions San Jose State for the Rams' homecoming game on October 9, 2021. The game was CSU's first Mountain West Conference game of the year, and the Spartans entered the game with a record of 3-2 (1-0 conference).

Colorado State received the ball to begin the game and drove the ball 75 yards down the field to score an opening-drive touchdown. Kicker Cayden Camper picked up the Rams' other nine first-half points on three field goals, and the Rams led 16–7 at halftime. At the 9:55 mark of the third quarter, CSU wide receiver Ty McCullouch scored a 60-yard receiving touchdown to put the Rams up 23–7. Following the touchdown, kicker Cayden Camper proceeded to make another three field goals, putting the Rams up 32–7. San Jose State scored a touchdown with 1:19 remaining in the game to make the final score 32–14. CSU moved to 2–3 on the year after the dominant homecoming victory.

Kicker Cayden Camper went 6/6 on field goals and broke the Colorado State record for field goals made in a game. Head coach Steve Addazio's conservative, smashmouth offense was largely to thank for this — four of his six field goals were under 30 yards long, which resulted from the Rams' inability to score in the red zone. However, Camper also hit a 53-yard field goal in the third quarter, which was a new career high for him.

Statistically, Colorado State dominated the game. The Rams recorded 449 yards to the Spartans' 267 yards and had eight more first downs, as well as winning the time of possession battle by just under 10 minutes. San Jose State also turned the ball over three times, while Colorado State did not record any turnovers. Quarterback Todd Centeio went 19/23 for 232 yards and a passing touchdown. Running back A'Jon Vivens bounced back from a poor performance at Iowa and recorded 114 yards on 31 carries. Wide receiver Ty McCullouch led receiving with two receptions for 71 yards and a touchdown, while tight end Trey McBride was held to six receptions for 60 yards.

=== New Mexico ===
	1	2	3	4	Total
Rams	7	6	10	13	36
Lobos	0	7	0	0	7

On October 16, 2021, Colorado State traveled to Albuquerque, New Mexico to face the New Mexico Lobos. The Rams entered the game on a hot streak with a 2–1 record in their last three games, and were determined to extend the Lobos' current four-game losing streak. The game kicked off at 5:00 pm Mountain Time.

From start to finish, Colorado State's defense dominated the game. At the 8:09 mark of the first quarter, Colorado State recorded their first interception of the game when cornerback Marshaun Cameron picked off Lobos quarterback CJ Montes on a badly underthrown pass. The Rams capitalized off of the interception and after a long drive, running back David Bailey scored a two-yard rushing touchdown with 2:57 remaining in the first quarter. Placekicker Cayden Camper followed the touchdown with a 21-yard field goal on the following drive, as the Rams were stopped just short of the endzone. The Lobos responded with their only score of the game, a 63-yard punt return touchdown on a Ryan Stonehouse punt at the 7:47 mark of the second quarter. Camper made a 47-yard field goal and missed a 36-yard field goal before halftime, making the score 13–7 at halftime.

On the opening drive of the second half, Rams running back David Bailey recorded his second two-yard rushing touchdown of the day, putting the Rams up 20–7. At the 6:01 mark of the third quarter, Lobos quarterback CJ Montes fumbled the snap, and Rams senior linebacker DeQuan Jackson recovered it. The fumble led to a 46-yard field goal by Cayden Camper with 4:20 remaining in the quarter. The fourth quarter opened with a 50-yard pass to Rams tight end Trey McBride, which set up Camper to make a 25-yard field goal. On Colorado State's next drive, quarterback Todd Centeio completed a 43-yard pass to tight end Gary Williams for a touchdown, making the score 33–7. On New Mexico's responding drive, quarterback CJ Montes recorded his third turnover of the day, throwing an interception at his own 12-yard line. Rams kicker Cayden Camper would score once more, a 21-yard field goal, to make the final score 36–7 in favor of the Rams.

In a dominant defensive performance, the Rams allowed the Lobos zero offensive points and just 76 yards of offense — 16 passing and 60 rushing — the second fewest allowed by Colorado State in a game in school history. The Rams put up 452 total yards with no turnovers, and quarterback Todd Centeio went 16/25 for 289 yards and a touchdown. Running back David Bailey led the team's rushing with 21 carries for 58 yards and two touchdowns, and tight end Trey McBride led receiving with seven receptions for 135 yards. Kicker Cayden Camper continued his hot streak, going 5/6 on field goals and 3/3 on extra points. Colorado State's record improved to 3-3, 2–0 in Mountain West Conference play.

=== Utah State ===
	1	2	3	4	Total
Rams	0	14	0	10	24
Aggies	0	20	3	3	26

Colorado State traveled to Logan, Utah to take on the Utah State Aggies on October 22, 2021. The Rams entered the game with a 3–3 record (2-0 conference), while the Aggies entered with a 4–2 record (2-1 conference). Colorado State entered the game at the top of the Mountain division of the Mountain West Conference, with Utah State being able to take that spot from them with a win.

Both teams were held scoreless through the first quarter, and both teams recorded an interception. The Aggies opened the second quarter with a 25-yard passing touchdown at the 14:45 mark, and the two teams would take turns scoring over the next three drives — two David Bailey rushing touchdowns for Colorado State, and another passing touchdown for Utah State — to tie the game at 14. Utah State closed the half with two consecutive field goals — a 45-yard field goal with 1:30 remaining in the half was followed by the Aggies recovering their own kickoff around CSU's own 20-yard line after a special teams mishap by CSU that set Utah State up for a 30-yard field goal to end the half with a 20–14 lead.

The only score of the third quarter came on a 42-yard field goal at the 9:23 mark for Utah State. After trading field goals in the fourth quarter to make the game 26–17, Colorado State put together a comeback effort, scoring a 13-yard passing touchdown on a pass from quarterback Todd Centeio to tight end Gary Williams with 3:31 remaining in the game. CSU's defense forced a punt on Utah State's responding drive to regain possession with just under a minute left in the game. A 15-yard reception by Ty McCullouch set the Rams up for a possible 42-yard game-winning field goal, but a catastrophic coaching error and lapse of judgement resulted in the Rams' field goal team rushing on to the field rather than spiking the ball to stop the clock. Placekicker Cayden Camper was forced to rush the 42-yard attempt, missing it as time expired. Utah State escaped with a narrow 26–24 victory and first place in the Mountain Division, while CSU fell to 3–4, with a 2–1 record in the Mountain West Conference. Following the game, head coach Steve Addazio deflected blame onto his players, saying that no coach had instructed the Special teams unit to substitute into the game.

Despite the loss, CSU recorded 128 more yards — 472 yards to Utah State's 344 yards — and the same amount of first downs (26) as Utah State. Quarterback Todd Centeio had 18 completions on 29 attempts for 282 yards, a touchdown and an interception. Running back David Bailey had a dominant game, recording 30 carries for 159 yards and two rushing touchdowns, as well as two receptions for 39 receiving yards. Tight end Gary Williams led the team's receiving, with three receptions for 80 yards and a touchdown.

=== Boise State ===
	1	2	3	4	Total
Broncos	0	7	14	7	28
Rams	13	3	3	0	19

On October 30, 2021, the Rams hosted Boise State for a Halloween weekend game, with fans being encouraged to wear their Halloween costumes to the 5:00 p.m. game. Colorado State looked to beat Boise State for the first time in program history, as the Broncos held a 10–0 record in all-time meetups between the schools. Both teams entered the game with a 3–4 record, with the Rams being 2-1 and the Broncos being 1–2 in Mountain West Conference play.

Colorado State scored on all three of their drives in the first quarter while holding Boise State scoreless. The Rams opened the game with a short, 22-yard field goal by placekicker Cayden Camper on their first drive of the game. On CSU's next drive, quarterback Todd Centeio completed a 30-yard pass to tight end Cameron Butler for a touchdown. On the Rams' final drive of the quarter, they settled for an even shorter, 20-yard field goal from Cayden Camper after failing to score from Boise State's two-yard line. The first quarter ended with a 13-0 Colorado State lead. Boise State scored their first points of the game on a nine-yard receiving touchdown with 1:50 remaining in the first half, and on the final drive of the half, the Rams once again settled for a short, 20-yard field goal after yet again being unable to punch in a touchdown from the two-yard line. The first half ended with a score of 16–7.

Boise State took over in the second half, scoring touchdowns on back-to-back drives in the third quarter to go up 21–16. Colorado State ended the third quarter with a fourth and final sub-30-yard Cayden Camper field goal, highlighting the team's inefficiency in the red zone. Boise State then scored a final touchdown on a 51-yard touchdown pass from quarterback Hank Bachmeier with 9:30 remaining in the fourth quarter, which would be the last score of the game. Boise State won 28–19, beating Colorado State for the 11th straight time. Colorado State fell to 3-5 (2-2 conference), and Boise State broke even on the season at 4-4 (2-2 conference).

Boise State recorded more total yards, time of possession, and first downs than Colorado State throughout the game. Neither team recorded a turnover. Quarterback Todd Centeio completed 23 passes on 36 attempts for 276 yards and a touchdown, as well as recording 10 rushing attempts for 65 yards. Tight end Trey McBride led the team's receiving with 10 receptions for 103 yards.

=== Wyoming ===
	1	2	3	4	Total
Rams	7	3	0	7	17
Cowboys	7	10	7	7	31

Colorado State headed north from Fort Collins to Laramie, Wyoming on November 6, 2021, to take on Wyoming in the year's Border War rivalry game. The Rams won the Bronze Boot in 2020. Wyoming entered the game on a four-game losing streak with a 4–4 record (0-4 conference), while Colorado State entered with a 3–5 record (2-2 conference).

After the first two drives of the game resulted in no score, Colorado State opened scoring with a four-yard receiving touchdown by wide receiver Dante Wright. Wyoming responded just 31 seconds later with a touchdown of their own on a 43-yard rushing touchdown by quarterback Levi Williams. Wyoming began the second quarter by topping off a four play, 97-yard drive with another rushing touchdown. The two teams then traded field goals to end the half 17–10 in favor of Wyoming. Both teams missed a field goal on their respective opening drives of the third quarter; on the third drive of the quarter, Wyoming scored a touchdown on a 25-yard pass to increase their lead to 24–10. The two teams exchanged passing touchdowns in the fourth quarter to end the game; the final score was 31–17 in favor of the Cowboys, who won the Bronze Boot back from Colorado State.

After starting 0–4 in Mountain West Conference play, Wyoming picked up their first conference win of the season with the rivalry game victory. It was the third consecutive conference loss for the Rams after they began 2–0. The Bronze Boot returned to Laramie for the fourth time in the past five matchups. Quarterback Todd Centeio completed 20 passes on 36 attempts for two touchdowns and two interceptions, as well as rushing for 46 yards on 11 carries. Running back David Bailey led the Rams in rushing with 19 carries for 88 yards, while tight end Trey McBride led receiving with nine receptions for 98 yards. Wide receiver Dante Wright scored both touchdowns for Colorado State, with 40 yards on six catches.

=== Air Force ===
	1	2	3	4	Total
Falcons	21	0	14	0	35
Rams	7	7	7	0	21

Colorado State hosted Air Force at Canvas Stadium on Saturday, November 13. Colorado State entered the game on a three-game losing streak with a 3–6 record while Air Force entered the game with a 6–3 record and a two-game losing streak, with losses to Army and San Diego State in their previous two games. The tailgate on the Colorado State University campus included military vehicles and equipment for fans to view as well as multiple flyovers for CSU's Military Appreciation Day.

Colorado State opened the game with a quick three-and-out, and Air Force responded by scoring a touchdown on their first drive. Air Force scored another touchdown to go up 14–0 before Colorado State quarterback Todd Centeio responded with a 15-yard rushing touchdown to make the score 14–7 at the 0:59 mark of the first quarter. Air Force promptly responded, scoring a touchdown on a 92-yard pass from quarterback Haaziq Daniels to wide receiver Brandon Lewis to bring the score to 21–7 at the end of the first quarter, which broke the record for the longest pass in Air Force school history. The sole score of the second quarter came on a touchdown run by Colorado State running back David Bailey, which made the score 21–14 at halftime. In the third quarter, the Falcons scored two touchdowns while the Rams scored one touchdown, bringing the score to 35–21. Neither team scored in the fourth quarter, and the Air Force Falcons won the Ram–Falcon Trophy for the fifth consecutive matchup.

Colorado State fell to 3–7 and extended their losing streak to four games. Air Force moved to 7–3 with a 4–2 Mountain West Conference record. Quarterback Todd Centeio completed just 13 passes on 22 attempts with no touchdowns and two interceptions, as well as leading the team in rushing with 55 yards and a touchdown. Running back David Bailey scored Colorado State's two other touchdowns on 49 rushing yards. Tight end Trey McBride led receiving with four receptions for 81 yards.

=== Hawaii ===
	1	2	3	4	Total
Rams	7	3	7	28	45
Rainbow Warriors	9	20	7	14	50

The 3–7 Colorado State Rams traveled to Clarence T.C. Ching Athletics Complex in Honolulu, Hawaii to take on the 4–7 Hawaii Rainbow Warriors on November 20, 2021. Both teams entered the matchup on a losing streak — Colorado State having lost their four previous games to Utah State, Boise State, Wyoming, and Air Force, while Hawaii lost their last three to Utah State, San Diego State, and UNLV.

After an opening drive field goal by Hawaii, Colorado State tight end Cameron Butler scored a 69-yard touchdown on their first drive of the game. Hawaii then made two more field goals, making the score 9–7 in favor of Hawaii at the end of the first quarter. The second quarter began with a Cayden Camper field goal at the 12:35 mark; Hawaii responded with a rushing touchdown to bring the score to 16–10 in their favor. Hawaii scored again on a 93-yard passing touchdown at the 3:00 mark — the second >90-yard passing touchdown that Colorado State allowed in consecutive games. Right before halftime, Hawaii defensive back Cameron Lockridge intercepted a pass from Colorado State quarterback Todd Centeio and returned it for a 40-yard touchdown with 13 seconds remaining in the first half to bring the score to 29–10 at halftime.

The two teams exchanged touchdowns in the third quarter to bring the score to 36–17. In the fourth quarter, Colorado State put together a comeback effort, scoring two unanswered touchdowns on a Cameron Butler catch and David Bailey run to bring the score to 36–31. The two teams exchanged four total touchdowns (two each) in the final four minutes of the game, and the game concluded with a final score of 50–45 in favor of Hawaii.

Colorado State fell to 3–8 on the season, and their losing streak increased to five games. Hawaii moved to 5–7 and snapped their own losing streak. Colorado State finished the game with 651 yards of total offense, while Hawaii finished with 535 yards. Quarterback Todd Centeio had the best statistical game of his Colorado State career, completing 29 passes on 48 attempts for 527 yards, five touchdowns and two interceptions. Running back David Bailey led the Rams in rushing with 16 carries for 87 yards, while wide receiver Dante Wright led receiving with 150 yards and a touchdown off of eight receptions. Tight ends Cameron Butler, Gary Williams, and Trey McBride all contributed heavily in the passing game as well — Butler went for 93 yards and two touchdowns on two receptions, Williams recorded 92 yards and two touchdowns on six receptions, and McBride caught six receptions for 89 yards.

=== Nevada ===
	1	2	3	4	Total
Wolf Pack	14	17	7	14	52
Rams	0	0	7	3	10

On November 27, 2021, the Nevada Wolf Pack traveled to Fort Collins to play the Rams in their final game of the 2021 season. A mere 17,465 fans were in attendance for the game at Canvas Stadium, a season-low attendance for the Rams at home. Colorado State entered the game on a five-game losing streak with a 3–8 record, while Nevada entered the game with a 7–4 record, having lost both of their last two games by just two points.

Nevada scored two first-quarter touchdowns — both from quarterback Carson Strong to wide receiver Tory Horton — to go up 14–0 at the end of the quarter. Nevada kept rolling in the second quarter, scoring two more unanswered touchdowns and a field goal to go up 31–0 at halftime. Colorado State finally got on the scoreboard with around a minute into the second half, when tight end Trey McBride took a fake punt run 69 yards for a touchdown. Despite this, Nevada would score three more touchdowns before Colorado State would score again with a Cayden Camper 33-yard field goal with around two minutes left in the game. Nevada won the game 52–10, handing Colorado State their largest defeat — a deficit of 42 points — since October 15, 2011, when the Rams lost to Boise State 63–13 at Hughes Stadium.

Colorado State lost their sixth consecutive game, losing the entire back half of the season to finish with a 3–9 record. Quarterback Todd Centeio finished his final game at Colorado State by completing 15 of 24 passes for 185 yards, no touchdowns and two interceptions. He finished the season having completed 229 of 380 passes for 2,958 yards, 15 touchdowns and 10 interceptions. Following the season, Centeio announced that he would transfer to James Madison for his final year of eligibility in 2022. Tight end Trey McBride led the Rams in both rushing and receiving, despite the 69-yard fake punt touchdown being his only rush attempt. He also caught six passes for 113 yards. McBride caught 90 passes for 1,121 yards throughout the 2021 season, leading all Division I FBS tight ends in receiving yards.

Head coach Steve Addazio was ejected from the game after being called for two unsportsmanlike conduct penalties, becoming the first ever Colorado State head coach to be ejected from a game. Addazio was fired on December 2, 2021, recording a 4–12 record in two years with the program. Nevada's head coach Jay Norvell was hired as Addazio's replacement just weeks after the two teams played. Nevada running back Avery Morrow and wide receiver Tory Horton, who both led the Wolf Pack statistically in their respective positions against Colorado State, announced they would be transferring to Colorado State following the 2021 season in order to remain with Norvell.

== Postseason ==
=== Awards and records ===
Mountain West All-Conference Selections

- Trey McBride, TE (First team)
- Scott Patchan, DE (First team)
- Ryan Stonehouse, P (Second team)

Other awards

- TE Trey McBride was named to all five major All-American teams (AFCA, AP, FWAA, SN, WCFF), making him the fifth consensus All-American and first unanimous All-American in program history.
- TE Trey McBride received the 2021 Mackey Award, an award given to college football's best tight end each season.
- DB Jack Howell was named to the 247Sports.com True Freshman All-American team and FWAA Freshman All-American team.
- P Ryan Stonehouse was named to the 2021 Pro Football Focus All-American second team.

New records

- FBS — Career Average Yards Per Punt: Punter Ryan Stonehouse broke the NCAA FBS record for highest career average yards per punt with his 47.8 yard average, which was previously held by Florida punter Johnny Townsend with a 46.2 average. Over the span of his collegiate career, Stonehouse punted 244 times for a total of 11,656 yards from 2017 to 2021.
- Mountain West Conference — Career Average Yards Per Punt: Punter Ryan Stonehouse also broke the Mountain West Conference's career average yards per punt record, which was previously set by BYU punter Matt Payne from 2001 to 2004.
- School Record — Made Field Goals (Single Game): Kicker Cayden Camper broke the Colorado State single game record for made field goals when he made six of six field goals against San Jose State on October 9, 2021.
- School Record — Made Field Goals (Single Season): Kicker Cayden Camper also broke the Colorado State single season record for made field goals by making 25 field goals throughout the 2021 season.
- School Record — Receptions & Receiving Yards by Tight End (Single Season): Tight end Trey McBride broke the Colorado State single season records for receptions and receiving yards by a tight end by recording 90 receptions for 1,121 yards in 2021.
- School Record — Receptions & Receiving Yards by Tight End (Career): Tight end Trey McBride also broke the Colorado State career records for receptions and receiving yards by a tight end by recording 157 receptions for 2,011 yards from 2018 to 2021.

=== Outgoing transfers ===
Colorado State had a number of athletes transfer away from the team, per the Coloradoan and 247Sports 2022 transfer portal.

Position	Name	Year	High School	Hometown	Seasons at CSU	Destination
QB	Todd Centeio	Rd. Senior	Dwyer	West Palm Beach, FL	2020, 2021	James Madison
QB	Jonah O'Brien	Rd. Sophomore	Bartlett	Bartlett, IL	2020, 2021	Eastern Illinois
QB	Evan Olaes	Freshman	Legacy	North Las Vegas, NV	2021	Indiana State
QB	Matt Valecce	Rd. Junior	Fordham Prep	Mamaroneck, NY	2021	Albany
RB	Christian Hunter	Junior	Kaiser	Fontana, CA	2019, 2020, 2021	To be announced
RB	Marcus McElroy Jr.	Grad. Student	Mullen	Denver, CO	2017, 2018, 2019, 2020, 2021†	McNeese State
WR	Keenan Brown	Rd. Sophomore	Dakota Ridge	Littleton, CO	2021	To be announced
WR	Kyjuan Herdon	Rd. Freshman	Trinity Christian	Jacksonville, FL	2020, 2021	Alcorn State
TE	Nick Picozzi	Rd. Junior	Lansdale Catholic	Collegeville, PA	2021	To be announced
TE	Brian Polendey	Rd. Senior	Guyer	Denton, TX	2020, 2021	West Virginia
TE	Dylan Walker	Rd. Freshman	Pope John Paul II	Douglassville, PA	2020, 2021	Albany
OL	Elijah Johnson	Rd. Senior	Dematha	Severn, MD	2020, 2021	To be announced
OL	Cole Feinauer	Freshman	Cheshire	Cheshire, CT	2021	Nevada
OL	Vincent Picozzi	Grad. Student	Lansdale Catholic	Collegeville, PA	2021	Northwestern
OL	Cam Reddy	Rd. Junior	Lawrence Acad.	Franklin, MA	2020, 2021	Liberty
OL/DL	Mike Ciaffoni	Rd. Sophomore	Lincoln-Sudbury	Sudbury, MA	2021	Rutgers
DL	Ellison Hubbard	Grad. Student	Grayson	Loganville, GA	2017, 2018, 2019, 2020, 2021†	Sam Houston St.
DB	Branden Coleman	Freshman	Columbus	Miami, FL	2021	Wagner
DB	Linwood Crump	Grad. Student	Piscataway	South Amboy, NJ	2021	New Mexico State

†= Left the Colorado State program in the middle of the 2021 season in order to maintain eligibility.

=== Players in the 2022 NFL draft ===
Round	Pick	Player	Position	NFL Club
2	55	Trey McBride	TE	Arizona Cardinals
