= 2020 Colorado State Rams football team =

American college football season

2020 Colorado State Rams football
- Conference: Mountain West Conference
- Record: 1–3 (1–3 MW)
- Head coach: Steve Addazio (1st season)
- Offensive coordinator: Joey Lynch (1st season)
- Offensive scheme: Pro spread
- Defensive coordinator: Chuck Heater (3rd season)
- Base defense: 4–3
- Home stadium: Canvas Stadium

Uniform
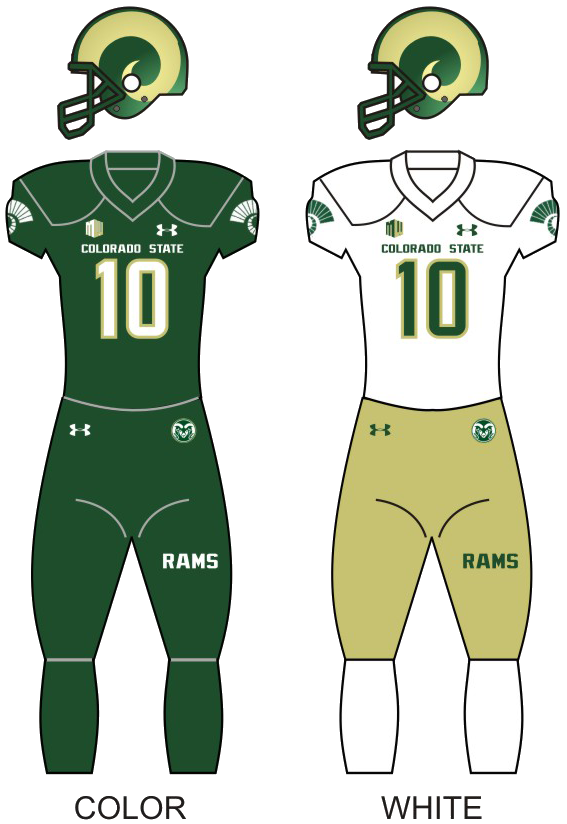

2020 Mountain West Conference football standings
	Conf.			Overall
Team	W		L	W		L
No. 24 San Jose State y$	6	–	0	7	–	1
Boise State y	5	–	0	5	–	2
Nevada	6	–	2	7	–	2
San Diego State	4	–	2	4	–	4
Hawaii	4	–	4	5	–	4
Fresno State	3	–	3	3	–	3
Air Force	2	–	2	3	–	3
Wyoming	2	–	4	2	–	4
New Mexico	2	–	5	2	–	5
Colorado State	1	–	3	1	–	3
Utah State	1	–	5	1	–	5
UNLV	0	–	6	0	–	6
Championship: San Jose State 34, Boise State 20
$ – Conference champion; y – Championship game participant; Note: Due to COVID-19, the Mountain West suspended the season, but later decided to begin play on October 24.; Rankings from AP Poll

The 2020 Colorado State Rams football team represented Colorado State University in the 2020 NCAA Division I FBS football season. Originally, there was a cancellation of the 2020 season for the Mountain West Conference due to the COVID-19 pandemic, but this was reversed when the conference agreed to play a conference-only, eight game season. The Rams were to play their opening game at Sonny Lubick Field at Canvas Stadium in Fort Collins, Colorado against New Mexico, but the game was canceled due to virus restrictions. The Rams were led by first-year head coach Steve Addazio.

== Schedule ==
The modified schedule included a game against New Mexico on October 24 that was canceled due to COVID-19 restrictions. The November 21 game vs. UNLV was also canceled due to COVID-19 cases related to contact tracing within the UNLV program. The November 26 game at Air Force was also canceled due to COVID-19 cases related to contact tracing within the Colorado State program. The December 12 game vs. Utah State was canceled by Utah State University as a result of a Utah State player boycott in protest of comments made by their university president that they perceived as discriminatory.

Date	Time	Opponent	Site	TV	Result	Attendance
October 24	7:00 p.m.	New Mexico	Canvas Stadium; Fort Collins, CO	FS2	Cancelled	
October 29	8:00 p.m.	at Fresno State	Bulldog Stadium; Fresno, CA	CBSSN	L 17–38	0 (behind closed doors)
November 5	7:00 p.m.	Wyoming	Canvas Stadium; Fort Collins, CO (Border War)	CBSSN	W 34–24	0 (behind closed doors)
November 12	6:00 p.m.	at Boise State	Albertsons Stadium; Boise, ID	FS1	L 21–52	1,100
November 21	3:30 p.m.	UNLV	Canvas Stadium; Fort Collins, CO	FS2	Cancelled	
November 26	12:00 p.m.	Air Force	Canvas Stadium; Fort Collins, CO	CBSSN	Cancelled	
December 5	8:30 p.m.	at San Diego State	Dignity Health Sports Park; Carson, CA	CBSSN	L 17–29	0 (behind closed doors)
December 12	7:30 p.m.	Utah State	Canvas Stadium; Fort Collins, CO	CBSSN	Cancelled	
All times are in Mountain time

== Preseason ==
Colorado State announced its 2020 football schedule on February 27, 2020. The 2020 schedule consisted of 6 home and 6 away games in the regular season. On August 10, 2020, the Mountain West Conference announced the suspension of the football season due to the COVID-19 pandemic. On September 25, the Mountain West announced the 2020 season would return with a revised 8-game, conference only season beginning October 24.

In August 2020, the university temporarily suspended the football program and initiated investigations into accusations of racism and verbal abuse of players by the coaching staff. However, the subsequent investigation found that the majority of athletes and staff disputed these accusations, and in October 2020, the investigation concluded and the team was cleared.

Wide receiver Warren Jackson was unanimously selected to the Mountain West Conference Preseason All-Conference Team, though he later opted out of the modified season to train for the NFL draft. Tight end Trey McBride, linebacker Dequan Jackson, and punter Ryan Stonehouse were also named to the 2020 Preseason All-Conference Team.

== Game summaries ==
=== Fresno State ===
	1	2	3	4	Total
Rams	3	7	0	7	17
Bulldogs	7	17	7	7	38

=== Wyoming ===
	1	2	3	4	Total
Wyoming	0	14	3	7	24
Rams	14	10	7	3	34

=== Boise State ===
	1	2	3	4	Total
Rams	0	7	14	0	21
Broncos	21	21	10	0	52

=== San Diego State ===
	1	2	3	4	Total
Rams	0	17	0	0	17
Aztecs	7	16	0	6	29

== Personnel ==
=== Coaching staff ===
Name	Position	Consecutive season at Colorado State in current position
Steve Addazio	Head coach	1st
Joey Lynch	Offensive coordinator/quarterbacks coach	1st
Chuck Heater	Defensive coordinator/safeties coach	1st
Antoine Smith	Assistant head coach/defensive line coach	1st
Louie Addazio	Offensive line coach	1st
Brian White	Running backs coach	1st
Cody Booth	Tight ends coach	1st
Kenny Guiton	Wide receivers coach	1st
Sean Cronin	Linebackers coach	1st
Kap Dede	Outside Linebackers/nickelbacks coach	1st
Anthony Perkins	Cornerbacks coach	2nd
Scott McLafferty	Head strength and conditioning coach	1st

=== Roster ===
2020 Colorado State Rams Football Roster
Quarterbacks: 2 Justice McCoy – Rs. Junior (New Orleans, LA); 7 Todd Centeio – Rs. Junior (West Palm Beach, FL); 10 Aaron Syverson – Rs. Freshman (Minnetonka, MN); 12 Patrick O'Brien – Rs. Senior (San Juan Capistrano, CA); 15 Jonah O'Brien – Rs. Freshman (Bartlett, IL); 17 Walker Brickle – (redshirt) Freshman (Arvada, CO); Running backs: 24 Kyjuan Herndon – (redshirt) Freshman (Jacksonville, FL); 27 Jaylen Thomas – (redshirt) Sophomore (Colorado Springs, CO); 28 Christian Hunter – Sophomore (Fontana, CA); 29 Tyreese Jackson – Rs. Freshman (Jeanerette, LA); 32 Marcus McElroy Jr. – Senior (Denver, CO); 34 Hunter Williams – Rs. Sophomore (Frisco, TX); 47 David Aggrey – Rs. Sophomore (Bronx, NY); Wide receivers: 1 Jadon Walker – Rs. Junior (Lithia Springs, GA); 3 E.J. Scott – Rs. Junior (Atlanta, GA); 6 Ty McCullouch – Sophomore (Moreno Valley, CA); 13 Jeremiah Pruitte – Rs. Freshman (Marietta, GA); 14 Nate Craig-Myers – Rs. Senior (Dade City, FL); 18 Thomas Pannunzio – Junior (Pueblo, CO); 20 A'Jon Vivens – Rs. Sophomore (Denver, CO); 22 Dante Wright – Sophomore (Navarre, FL); 26 Logan Ludwig – Rs. Sophomore (Roxborough Park, CO); 38 Chris Franquemont – (redshirt) Freshman (Highlands Ranch, CO); 40 Dawson Menegatti – (redshirt) Freshman (Pueblo West, CO); 44 Garrett Burns – (redshirt) Freshman (Fort Collins, CO); 81 Dane Olson – Rs. Freshman (San Diego, CA); 83 Chris McEahern – Rs. Freshman (Arvada, CO); 87 Ryan Sayre – Rs. Senior (Castle Rock, CO); Tight ends: 16 Cam Butler – Senior (Columbia, SC); 40 Corte Tapia – Rs. Junior (Windsor, CO); 80 Sawyer Shepherd – (redshirt) Freshman (Loveland, CO); 82 Dylan Walker – (redshirt) Freshman (Douglassville, PA); 84 Gary Williams – Rs. Sophomore (Charlotte, NC); 85 Trey McBride – Junior (Fort Morgan, CO); 88 Brian Polendey – Rs. Junior (Denton, TX); 89 Kyle Helbig – Rs. Freshman (Broomfield, CO)	Offensive linemen: 50 Owen Snively – (redshirt) Freshman (Fremont, NH); 52 Adam Korutz – Grad. Student (Johnson City, NY); 53 Elijah Johnson – Rs. Junior (Severn, MD); 55 Cam Reddy – Rs. Sophomore (Franklin, MA); 56 Ches Jackson – Rs. Sophomore (Tifton, GA); 60 Florian McCann – Rs. Sophomore (Denver, CO); 63 Alex Azusenis – Rs. Freshman (Powell, OH); 64 Scott Brooks – Rs. Senior (Moorpark, CA); 65 Tautai Li'o Marks – (redshirt) Freshman (Santa Ana, CA); 69 Barry Wesley – Rs. Junior (Morrison, CO); 70 Joctavis Phillips – Rs. Junior (West Monroe, LA); 71 Brian Crespo-Jaquez – (redshirt) Freshman (Fort Collins, CO); 72 Dirk Nelson – (redshirt) Freshman (Visalia, CA); 73 Gage Gaynor – Freshman (Parkland, FL); 76 John Blasco Jr. – Rs. Junior (Tacoma, WA); 77 Keith Williams – Rs. Senior (Baltimore, MD); 79 Tex Elliott – (redshirt) Freshman (Indianapolis, IN); Defensive linemen: 0 Toby McBride – Rs. Senior (Fort Morgan, CO); 1 Scott Patchan – Grad. Student (Tampa, FL); 15 Brandon Hickerson-Rooks – Rs. Junior (Harrisburg, PA); 33 Manny Jones – Senior (Cartersville, GA); 44 Blake Householder – Rs. Sophomore (Missouri City, TX); 49 Brandon Derrow – Rs. Sophomore (Columbus, OH); 50 Cian Quiroga – Rs. Freshman (Denver, CO); 52 Aidan Cullen – Rs. Freshman (Monument, CO); 56 Rushton Roberts – Rs. Sophomore (Jacksonville, FL); 59 Grant Stewartson – (redshirt) Freshman (Castle Pines, CO); 68 Cam Bariteau – Freshman (Wareham, MA); 90 Casey Irons Jr. – (redshirt) Freshman (Gilmer, TX); 91 James Mitchell – Freshman (Duncanville, TX); 92 Livingston Paogofie – Senior (Arlington, TX); 94 Devin Phillips – Junior (Monroe, LA); 98 Ellison Hubbard – Senior (Loganville, GA); 99 Luis Lebron – Rs. Junior (Jacksonville, FL); Placekickers: 35 Joe DeLine – Rs. Senior (Steamboat Springs, CO); 93 Jonathan Terry – Rs. Sophomore (Castle Rock, CO); 95 Cayden Camper – Sophomore (Pueblo, CO); 96 Robert Liss – (redshirt) Freshman (Phoenix, AZ)	Linebackers: 5 Dequan Jackson – Junior (Jacksonville, FL); 12 Cam'Ron Carter – Junior (Tucker, GA); 30 Chase Wilson – Freshman (Arvada, CO); 31 Tanner Hollens – Freshman (Littleton, CO); 35 Aaron Moore – Freshman (Oakland, TN); 36 Payton Polson – Rs. Freshman (Highlands Ranch, CO); 37 Blake Beecher – Rs. Freshman (Norco, CA); 39 Sanjay Strickland – Freshman (Arvada, CO); 42 Mohamed Kamara – Sophomore (Newark, NJ); 43 Troy Golden – Rs. Sophomore (Orlando, FL); 45 Bam Amina – Freshman (Waianae, HI); 46 Devon Edwards – (redshirt) Freshman (Mead, CO); 53 Cade Plath – Rs. Freshman (Chanhassen, MN); 55 Tavian Brown – Rs. Freshman (Demopolis, AL); 57 Will Drewes – Freshman (Longmont, CO); 58 Quinn Meinert – Freshman (St. Cloud, MN); Defensive backs: 2 Dajon Owens – Senior (Los Angeles, CA); 4 Rashad Ajayi – Junior (Atlanta, GA); 8 Quinn Brinnon – Junior (Pleasanton, CA); 9 Logan Stewart – Rs. Senior (Loveland, CO); 10 Tywan Francis – Junior (New Orleans, LA); 11 Henry Blackburn – Freshman (Boulder, CO); 14 Brandon Guzman – (redshirt) Freshman (Pasadena, CA); 17 Christian Cumber – Rs. Junior (Denver, CO); 19 Xavier Goldsmith – Rs. Freshman (Detroit, MI); 23 Mikell Harvey – Rs. Sophomore (Slidell, LA); 25 Keevan Bailey – Sophomore (Conyers, GA); 26 Marshaun Cameron – Rs. Senior (Los Angeles, CA); 32 Liam Huber – Freshman (Erie, CO); 34 Titus Jones – Rs. Sophomore (Kingston, GA); 38 Adonis Rufran – Rs. Junior (Colorado Springs, CO); 38 Griffin Vander Waerdt – (redshirt) Freshman (Parker, CO); Long snappers: 86 Ross Reiter – Junior (Phoenix, AZ); 97 Huck Vollmar – Rs. Junior (Colorado Springs, CO); Punters: 41 Ryan Stonehouse – Senior (La Verne, CA); 99 Jack Gabbe – Freshman (Jupiter, FL)

(redshirt) = Redshirted for the 2020 season. | Rs. = Redshirted in a previous season.

== Awards and honors ==
Mountain West All-Conference selections:

- Scott Patchan, DE (First team)
- Ryan Stonehouse, P (First team)
- Dante Wright, WR (Second team)
- Trey McBride, TE (Second team)
- Dequan Jackson, LB (Second team)

== After the season ==
=== Outgoing transfers ===
Colorado State lost 12 athletes to the transfer portal, per the Coloradoan.

Position	Name	Year	High school	Hometown	Seasons at CSU	Destination
QB	Patrick O'Brien	Rd. Senior	San Juan Hills	San Juan Capistrano, CA	2018, 2019, 2020	Washington
RB	Tyreese Jackson	Rd. Freshman	Westgate	Jeanerette, LA	2019, 2020	Louisiana
WR	Nate Craig-Myers	Rd. Senior	Tampa Catholic	Dade City, FL	2019, 2020	UCF
WR	Jeremiah Pruitte	Rd. Freshman	Wheeler	Marietta, GA	2019, 2020	Florida A&M
WR	Jadon Walker	Rd. Junior	Chapel Hill	Lithia Springs, GA	2017, 2018, 2019, 2020	N/A
DL	Casey Irons Jr.	Freshman	Gilmer	Gilmer, TX	2020	Northern Colorado
DL	Livingston Paogofie	Senior	Bowie	Arlington, TX	2017, 2018, 2019, 2020	Dixie State
DB	Keevan Bailey	Sophomore	Salem	Conyers, GA	2019, 2020	N/A
DB	Caleb Blake	Rd. Freshman	Bishop Moore	Winter Haven, FL	2019, 2020	Florida State
DB	Christian Cumber	Rd. Junior	Mullen	Denver, CO	2017, 2018, 2019, 2020	N/A
DB	Xavier Goldsmith	Rd. Freshman	Cass Technical	Detroit, MI	2019, 2020	Idaho State
DB	Dajon Owens	Senior	Gardena	Los Angeles, CA	2018, 2019, 2020	Stony Brook
