= Jon Budmayr =

American football player (born 1990)

Current position
- Title: Wide receivers
- Team: Iowa
- Conference: Big Ten

Biographical details
- Born: December 15, 1990 (age 35); Belle Fourche, South Dakota, U.S.

Playing career
- 2009–2011: Wisconsin
- Position: Quarterback

Coaching career (HC unless noted)
- 2012–2013: Wisconsin (SA)
- 2014: Pittsburgh (GA)
- 2015: Wisconsin (GA)
- 2016–2017: Wisconsin (OQC)
- 2018–2020: Wisconsin (QB)
- 2021: Colorado State (OC/QB)
- 2022–2023: Iowa (OA)
- 2024–present: Iowa (WR)

Jon Budmayr (born December 15, 1990) is an American football coach who is currently the wide receivers coach for Iowa. He played college football at Wisconsin.

== Playing career ==
Budmayr was a quarterback at Wisconsin from 2009 to 2011 before he retired due to having multiple surgeries regarding nerve issues.

== Coaching career ==
Budmayr stayed at Wisconsin as a student assistant in 2012 and 2013 before going on to Pittsburgh in 2014 as a graduate assistant under his former position coach, Paul Chryst.

=== Wisconsin (second stint) ===
Budmayr joined Chryst at Wisconsin in 2015 as a graduate assistant, working with the quarterbacks as there was no official position coach. He was shifted to a quality control assistant the next season, continuing to coach the quarterbacks. When the NCAA approved the hiring of a 10th assistant coach in 2018, Budmayr was officially promoted to quarterbacks coach.

In 2018, Budmayr's starting quarterback was Alex Hornibrook. Hornibrook had passed for 25 touchdowns and 15 interceptions the previous season when Paul Chryst was the position coach. Under Budmayr's coaching, Hornibrook dropped to 13 touchdowns and 11 interceptions, with his passer rating falling 16 points. In 2019, Jack Coan was named quarterback. He threw 18 touchdowns and 5 interceptions. After transferring to Notre Dame in 2021, Coan threw for 25 touchdowns, only 7 interceptions, and 400 more yards under quarterback coach Tommy Rees.

In 2020, Budmayr's quarterback was blue chip recruit Graham Mertz. Mertz threw for 9 touchdowns and 5 interceptions, with a 125.2 passer rating. Mertz would improve when leaving Wisconsin for Florida, throwing for 19 touchdowns and 10 interceptions with a 157.8 passer rating in 2023.

=== Colorado State ===
Budmayr was named the offensive coordinator and quarterbacks coach at Colorado State on February 4, 2021. He was replaced by Matt Mumme after one season at CSU as head coach Steve Addazio was fired. Budmayr also coached quarterbacks in Fort Collins. His starting quarterback, Todd Centeio, finished the season with 15 touchdowns,10 interceptions, and a 133.4 passer rating. Centeio would transfer to James Madison the following year and pass for 25 touchdowns and only 5 interceptions, improving his rating to 169 in the Dukes' transition year into FBS. Centeio was the fourth straight starting quarterback coached by Budmayr that had better statistical production when coached by other quarterback coaches.

The Rams offense finished 97th in scoring offense in the nation, averaging 23.7 points per game.

=== Iowa ===
In 2022 he became an offensive analyst for Iowa. Among his responsibilities were helping Iowa offensive coordinator Brian Ferentz with coaching quarterbacks. "He's been a tremendous resource," Brian Ferentz said of Budmayr. “He’s been a tremendous addition," Ferentz continued. "A lot of good ideas, a lot of good input.” Budmayr introduced a "matrix" style of learning for Iowa quarterbacks, including two-year starter Spencer Petras. Before Budmayr arrived on campus, Petras threw for 10 touchdowns and 9 interceptions with a 117.3 passer rating. Under Budmayr and Ferentz's instruction, he dropped to 5 touchdowns and 5 interceptions on a 109.8 rating. His completion percentage dropped from 57.3% to 55.9%. Iowa finished 123rd out of 131 teams in total passing offense at 156.7 yards per game. Budmayr recruited two transfer quarterbacks he had previous relationships with, Cade McNamara from Michigan and Deacon Hill from Wisconsin.

In 2023, Budmayr was a "special assistant to the head coach" and continued to assist Brian Ferentz with quarterbacks. Iowa finished 132 out of 133 FBS teams at 15.4 points per game. Iowa was 130th in passing yards per game at 118.6 yards per game. McNamara, before suffering a season-ending injury, finished with his worst collegiate passer rating. His 2021 season as Michigan's starting quarterback saw McNamara throw for 15 touchdowns and 6 interceptions, with a 141.9 passer rating under quarterbacks coach Matt Weiss. Under Ferentz and Budmayr at Iowa, he dropped to 4 touchdowns and 3 interceptions, with a 106.2 passer rating. McNamara was the sixth straight starting quarterback under Budmayr, including Petras, that had better statistical production under different quarterback coaching. The majority of Iowa's season saw Deacon Hill start at quarterback. Hill finished the season completing 48.6% of his passes, throwing for 5 touchdowns and 8 interceptions. His passer rating was 87.4. Offensive coordinator Brian Ferentz was fired after the season.

Due to extensive QB coaching and OC experience, Budmayr was elevated to Iowa's wide receivers coach in February 2024.
