= John Howell (defensive back) =

American football player (born 1978)

No. 38, 40, 44
- Position: Safety

Personal information
- Born: April 28, 1978 (age 48); North Platte, Nebraska, U.S.
- Listed height: 6 ft 0 in (1.83 m)
- Listed weight: 210 lb (95 kg)

Career information
- High school: Mullen (Mullen, Nebraska)
- College: Colorado State
- NFL draft: 2001: 4th round, 117th overall pick

Career history
- Tampa Bay Buccaneers (2001–2004); Seattle Seahawks (2005–2006)

Awards and highlights
- Super Bowl champion (XXXVII); First-team All-MW (2000)

Career NFL statistics
- Career tackles: 115
- Forced recoveries: 2
- Passes defended: 3
- Stats at Pro Football Reference

John Thomas Howell (born April 28, 1978) is an American former professional football player who was a safety in the National Football League (NFL). He played for the Tampa Bay Buccaneers and Seattle Seahawks. He played college football for the Colorado State Rams.

== Early life ==
Howell was born in North Platte, Nebraska, and attended Mullen High School in Mullen, Nebraska. He was a letterman in American football, wrestling, track and field, and golf. In football, he was a two-time first-team All-Conference honoree, and as a senior, he was an All-State honorable mention selection. In wrestling, he was a state runner-up as a junior and as a senior, won the Nebraska State Championship.

== College ==
Howell played college football at Colorado State University, and attended the university on a football scholarship.

== Professional career ==
Pre-draft measurables
Height	Weight	Arm length	Hand span	40-yard dash	10-yard split	20-yard split	20-yard shuttle	Three-cone drill	Vertical jump	Broad jump	Bench press
5 ft 11 5/8 in (1.82 m)	204 lb (93 kg)	31 1/2 in (0.80 m)	8 1/2 in (0.22 m)	4.59 s	1.60 s	2.65 s	4.12 s	6.87 s	37.0 in (0.94 m)	10 ft 1 in (3.07 m)	14 reps
All values from NFL Combine

Howell was selected by the Tampa Bay Buccaneers in the fourth round of the 2001 NFL draft. He played four seasons with the Tampa Bay Buccaneers, including Super Bowl XXXVII in 2002. Howell signed with the Seattle Seahawks for the 2006 season. He suffered a season-ending hamstring injury in the 2006 Seahawks' playoff game against the Dallas Cowboys and was waived shortly thereafter.

== NFL career statistics ==
Legend
**Bold**	Career high

=== Regular season ===
Year	Team	Games		Tackles					Interceptions					Fumbles			
Year	Team	GP	GS	Cmb	Solo	Ast	Sck	TFL	Int	Yds	TD	Lng	PD	FF	FR	Yds	TD
2001	TAM	14	1	**35**	26	**9**	0.0	**4**	0	0	0	0	0	0	**1**	0	0
2002	TAM	**16**	1	28	23	5	0.0	2	0	0	0	0	**2**	0	0	0	0
2003	TAM	8	0	7	6	1	0.0	0	0	0	0	0	0	0	**1**	0	0
2004	TAM	**16**	**6**	34	**30**	4	0.0	0	0	0	0	0	1	0	0	0	0
2005	SEA	10	0	11	8	3	0.0	0	0	0	0	0	0	0	0	0	0
		64	8	115	93	22	0.0	6	0	0	0	0	3	0	2	0	0

=== Playoffs ===
Year	Team	Games		Tackles					Interceptions					Fumbles			
Year	Team	GP	GS	Cmb	Solo	Ast	Sck	TFL	Int	Yds	TD	Lng	PD	FF	FR	Yds	TD
2001	TAM	1	0	0	0	0	0.0	0	0	0	0	0	0	0	0	0	0
2002	TAM	**3**	0	**4**	**4**	0	0.0	0	0	0	0	0	0	0	0	0	0
2006	SEA	1	0	0	0	0	0.0	0	0	0	0	0	0	0	0	0	0
		5	0	4	4	0	0.0	0	0	0	0	0	0	0	0	0	0

== Personal life ==
Howell lives in Colorado with his wife, Laura, and their three children. His daughter Jaelin is a soccer player. His son Jack is a safety for Colorado State.

Howell is an avid hunter and active with organizations such as Safari Club International, the Dallas Safari Club, and the National Rifle Association of America. In 2007, he co-founded Dismal River Outfitters, a hunting ranch and resort in Mullen, Nebraska, with his former Buccaneer and Seahawk teammate, Joe Jurevicius.

== See also ==
- Waivers (American football)
- List of Seattle Seahawks players
