= Trey McBride =

American football player (born 1999)

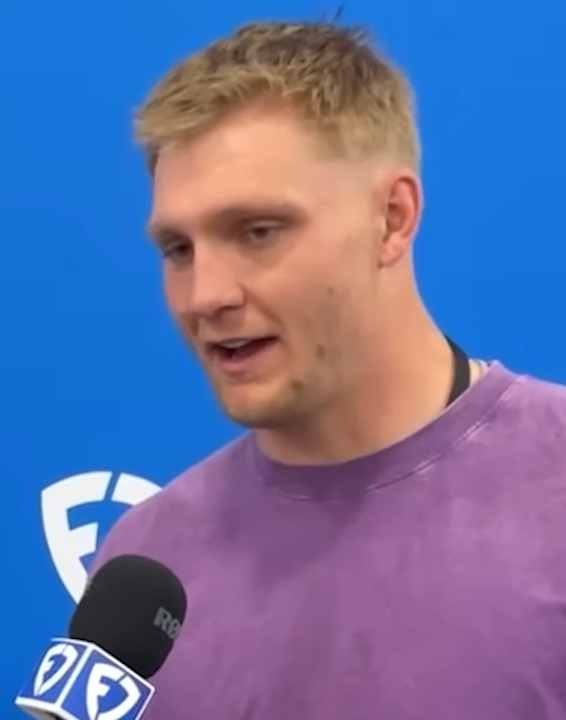
- McBride in 2024

No. 85 – Arizona Cardinals
- Position: Tight end
- Roster status: Active

Personal information
- Born: November 22, 1999 (age 26); Greeley, Colorado, U.S.
- Listed height: 6 ft 4 in (1.93 m)
- Listed weight: 246 lb (112 kg)

Career information
- High school: Fort Morgan (Fort Morgan, Colorado)
- College: Colorado State (2018–2021)
- NFL draft: 2022: 2nd round, 55th overall pick

Career history
- Arizona Cardinals (2022–present)

Awards and highlights
- First-team All-Pro (2025); 2× Pro Bowl (2024, 2025); John Mackey Award (2021); Unanimous All-American (2021); MW Male Athlete of the Year (2021); 2× First-team All-MW (2019, 2021); Second-team All-MW (2020); NFL record: Receptions in a season by a tight end: 126 (2025)

Career NFL statistics as of Week 10, 2026
- Receptions: 425
- Receiving yards: 4,110
- Receiving touchdowns: 22
- Stats at Pro Football Reference

Trey McBride (born November 22, 1999) is an American professional football tight end for the Arizona Cardinals of the National Football League (NFL). He played college football for the Colorado State Rams, where he was named a unanimous All-American and the John Mackey Award winner in 2021. McBride was selected by the Cardinals in the second round of the 2022 NFL draft.

== Early life ==
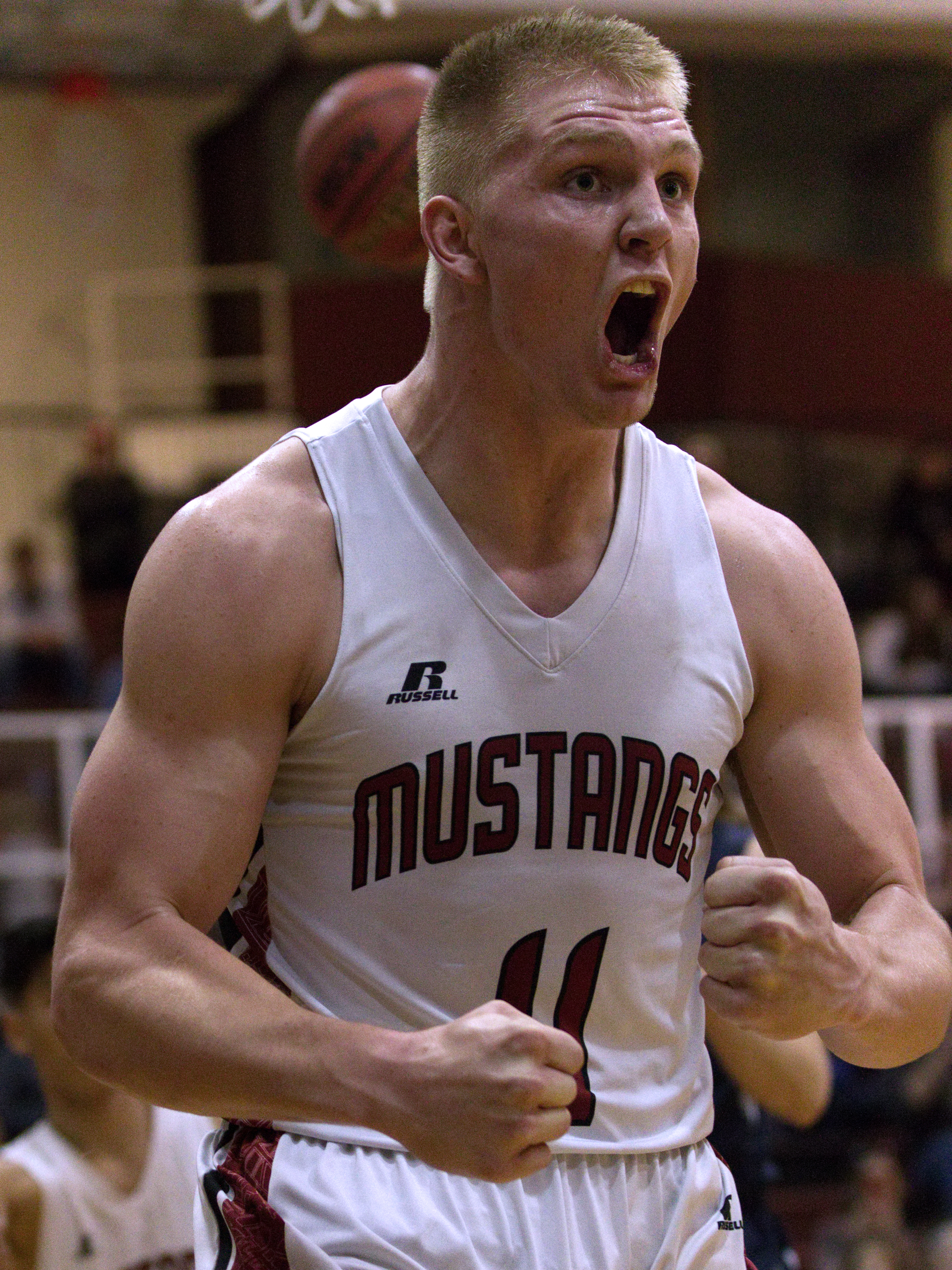
McBride with the Fort Morgan Mustangs in 2018

McBride grew up in Fort Morgan, Colorado, the son of Kate and Jen McBride. He attended Fort Morgan High School, where he played baseball, basketball, and football. As a junior, he had 32 catches for 751 yards and 11 touchdowns and was named Class 3A All-Colorado. He repeated as an All-Colorado selection as a senior after rushing for 226 yards, catching 30 passes for 450 yards, and scoring four total touchdowns while also recording 40 tackles and one sack on defense. McBride holds the school's career records for points scored in basketball, as well as for career home runs and runs batted in in baseball.

== College career ==
Considered a three-star recruit by 247Sports coming out of high school, McBride accepted a scholarship offer from Colorado State over offers from Colorado, California, Kansas State, Navy, Northern Colorado, and Wyoming.

As a freshman, McBride played in all 12 of Colorado State's games, starting five games. He caught seven passes for 89 yards and one touchdown. McBride was also an Academic All-Mountain West Conference selection and was named first-team Academic All-Colorado by the Colorado Chapter of the National Football Foundation.

As a sophomore, McBride was named first team All-Mountain West after finishing his first full season as a starter with 45 receptions for 560 yards and four touchdowns. McBride recorded his first 100-yard receiving game on November 29, 2019, where he had nine catches for 101 yards against Boise State.

Prior to his junior season and amidst the COVID-19 pandemic, McBride briefly entered the transfer portal before deciding to stay with the team. He was one of two team captains and started all four games of the team's COVID-19-shortened 2020 season. He was named second team All-Mountain West after catching 22 passes for 330 yards and four touchdowns in four games and was also named an All-American honorable mention by Pro Football Focus (PFF). McBride led the team in both receiving yardage and scoring and became the first CSU tight end to ever lead the team in points scored in a season.

In anticipation of his senior season, McBride was named to a number of award watch lists, including the Biletnikoff Award, Mackey Award, Lombardi Award, and the Senior Bowl watch list. On September 4, 2021, the first game of McBride's senior season, he recorded 13 catches for 116 yards against South Dakota State and was named to the National Team of the Week by PFF. In a week three 22–6 victory over Toledo, he caught nine passes for 109 receiving yards on a team-total 110 passing yards and was named the Offensive Player of the Week by the Senior Bowl. On October 16, 2021, McBride recorded a college career-high 135 receiving yards on 7 receptions against New Mexico. On November 6, 2021, in a Border War loss to Wyoming, he had nine receptions for 98 yards and broke the Colorado State school record for career receiving yards by a tight end.

McBride recorded at least 100 receiving yards in six of his 12 games played in 2021, and recorded less than 50 receiving yards only once. He was named the Mountain West Male Athlete of the Year, was selected to the 2021 All-Mountain West first team, and recognized as the nation's best tight end in college football by receiving the 2021 Mackey Award on December 9, 2021. McBride was also named to all five major All-American teams (AFCA, AP, FWAA, SN, WCFF) in 2021, making him the fifth consensus All-American and first unanimous All-American in Colorado State football history.

McBride holds multiple Colorado State school records, including the records for most receptions and receiving yards by tight end in a single season (90 receptions for 1,121 yards in 2021), as well as the records for receptions and receiving yards in a career by a tight end (157 receptions for 2,011 yards from 2018 to 2021).

== Professional career ==
Pre-draft measurables
Height	Weight	Arm length	Hand span	Wingspan	40-yard dash	10-yard split	20-yard split	Vertical jump	Broad jump	Bench press
6 ft 3 5/8 in (1.92 m)	246 lb (112 kg)	32 1/2 in (0.83 m)	10 1/8 in (0.26 m)	6 ft 6 5/8 in (2.00 m)	4.56 s	1.60 s	2.61 s	33.0 in (0.84 m)	9 ft 9 in (2.97 m)	18 reps
All values from NFL Combine/Pro Day

=== 2022 ===
McBride was selected by the Arizona Cardinals in the second round (55th overall) of the 2022 NFL draft. He made his NFL debut in Week 2 against the Las Vegas Raiders. He scored his first professional touchdown in a 20–19 loss against the Atlanta Falcons in Week 17. As a rookie, he appeared in 16 games and started 13. He finished with 29 receptions for 265 receiving yards and one receiving touchdown.

=== 2023 ===
During Week 10 of the 2023 season against the Falcons, McBride became the first Cardinals tight end to receive 100 or more yards in a game since Rob Awalt in 1989. He finished his second season with 81 receptions for 825 yards and three touchdowns.

=== 2024 ===
In Week 2 of the 2024 NFL season, McBride recorded six receptions on six targets for 67 yards, along with recovering a fumble for a touchdown in a 41–10 win against the Los Angeles Rams. He was inactive during Week 4 after suffering an concussion the previous week. In Week 6, McBride caught all eight of his targets for 96 yards in a 34–13 loss to the Green Bay Packers. In Week 8, he recorded nine receptions on 11 targets for 124 yards against the Miami Dolphins in a 28–27 win. In Week 9 against the Chicago Bears, McBride rushed for a touchdown in a 29–9 victory. He finished with a career-high 133 receiving yards on 12 receptions in a loss to the Seahawks in Week 12. In Week 17 against the Rams, McBride caught his first receiving touchdown of the season, finishing the game with 123 yards on 12 receptions. The touchdown was McBride's 98th catch of the season, marking a new NFL record for a player to catch his first touchdown of the year. However, McBride's performance was marred after a pass from Kyler Murray bounced off his helmet just short of the goal line with 42 seconds remaining, leading to a game-sealing interception. In the 2024 season, McBride finished with 111 receptions for 1,146 yards and two touchdowns. He was ranked 65th by his fellow players on the NFL Top 100 Players of 2025.

=== 2025 ===
On April 3, 2025, McBride signed a four-year contract extension with the Cardinals worth $76 million with $43 million guaranteed, making him the highest-paid tight end in NFL history at the time of the signing. He was later beaten for highest paid tight end by George Kittle. With his 16 consecutive game with 5 catches, McBride surpassed Travis Kelce for most games in a row with 5 catches for tight end. McBride is also the first tight end to ever have consecutive seasons with 100 catches. In a week 16 game against the Cincinnati Bengals, he set the single season receptions record for tight ends. McBride concluded his season with 126 catches for 1,239 yards and 11 touchdowns.

=== 2026 ===
On November 11, 2026, Coach Mike LaFleur named McBride a captain for week 10 and beyond.

== Career statistics ==
Legend
**Bold**	Career high

=== NFL ===
==== Regular season ====
Year	Team	Games		Receiving					Fumbles	
Year	Team	GP	GS	Rec	Yds	Avg	Lng	TD	Fum	Lost
2022	ARI	16	13	29	265	9.1	29	1	**1**	0
2023	ARI	17	12	81	825	10.2	**38**	3	**1**	0
2024	ARI	16	16	111	1,146	**10.3**	37	2	0	0
2025	ARI	17	17	**126**	**1,239**	9.8	31	**11**	0	0
2026	ARI	10	10	78	635	8.1	27	5	**1**	0
Career		76	68	425	4,110	9.7	38	22	3	0

=== College ===
Season	Team	Games		Receiving				Rushing			
Season	Team	GP	GS	Rec	Yds	Avg	TD	Att	Yds	Avg	TD
2018	Colorado State	12	5	7	89	12.7	1	**2**	3	1.5	**1**
2019	Colorado State	12	11	45	560	12.4	**4**	0	0	0.0	0
2020	Colorado State	4	4	22	330	**15.0**	**4**	0	0	0.0	0
2021	Colorado State	12	12	**90**	**1,121**	12.5	1	1	**69**	**69.0**	**1**
Career		40	32	164	2,100	12.8	10	3	72	24.0	2

== Family ==
McBride is the first NFL player whose parents are a same-sex couple. He has two older brothers, a twin brother, and a younger sister. One of Trey's older brothers, Toby, played football at Colorado State as a defensive end.
