= 2011 New Mexico Bowl =

American college football game

2011 Gildan New Mexico Bowl
Temple Owls	Wyoming Cowboys
(8–4)	(8–4)
MAC	Mountain West
37	15
Head coach: Steve Addazio	Head coach: Dave Christensen
	1	2	3	4	Total
Temple	7	21	3	6	37
Wyoming	0	7	0	8	15
- Date: December 17, 2011
- Season: 2011
- Stadium: University Stadium
- Location: Albuquerque, New Mexico
- MVP: QB Chris Coyer, Temple; LB Tahir Whitehead, Temple
- Favorite: Temple by 7
- Referee: Tom Tomczyk (Big East)
- Attendance: 25,762
- Payout: US$750,000 per team

United States TV coverage
- Network: ESPN
- Announcers: Clay Matvick (Play-by-Play); Brian Griese (Analyst); Jessica Mendoza (Sidelines)
- Nielsen ratings: 1.54

The 2011 New Mexico Bowl was a post-season American college football bowl game, held on December 17, 2011 at University Stadium on the campus of the University of New Mexico in Albuquerque, New Mexico as part of the 2011-12 NCAA Bowl season.

The game, which was telecast at 12 p.m. MT on ESPN, featured the Wyoming Cowboys from the Mountain West Conference versus the Temple Owls from the Mid-American Conference.

Temple made its first trip to the New Mexico Bowl, becoming the first team from the MAC to appear in the game. The Owls made just their fourth bowl appearance in school history, and their second in the last three years. Wyoming appeared in its second New Mexico Bowl. The Cowboys were 35–28 victors over Fresno State in the 2009 New Mexico Bowl.

The two schools have only previously played each other on one occasion. Wyoming won the 1990 matchup in Laramie, Wyoming by a score of 38–23.

Temple controlled the game from start to finish in a 37-15 win. The Owls were led by running back Bernard Pierce who ran for 100 yards and two touchdowns. Temple's aggressive defense held Wyoming's spread offense to just 267 yards (127 passing).

== Teams ==
=== Temple ===
The Owls were led by offensively RB Bernard Pierce (1,381 yds., 25 TDs), QB Chester Stewart (743 passing yds.) and TE Evan Rodriguez (427 receiving yds.); and defensively by LB Stephen Johnson (113 tackles, 2.0 sacks), DL Adrian Robinson (47 tackles, 6.0 sacks), and DB Justin Gildea (46 tackles, 3.0 sacks, 3 INT).

=== Wyoming ===
Making its 13th bowl game appearance, the Cowboys were led offensively by RB Alvester Alexander (678 rushing yds., 6 TDs), QB Brett Smith (385 att., 233 of 385 passes, 2,495 yards, 18 TDs), and WR Chris McNeill (504 receiving yds., 4 TDs); and defensively by SS Luke Ruff (97 tackles), DE Gabe Knapton (74 tackles, 6.5 sacks) and DB Blair Burns (48 tackles, 4 INT).

== Game summary ==
Wyoming wore their home brown uniforms, and Temple wore white visitor uniforms. Temple sophomore quarterback Chris Coyer, the offensive MVP, threw for 169 yards and a touchdown and rushed for 71 yards. Defensive MVP, senior linebacker Tahir Whitehead, tallied 11 tackles including 1.5 for a loss. Temple jumped out to a 37-7 lead behind a balanced offensive attack and out-gained Wyoming 424 yards to 267. Bernard Pierce ran for 100 yards and two touchdowns while backup Matt Brown added 49 yards and another score. Wide receiver Rod Streater caught a 61-yard touchdown at the end of the first half.

=== Scoring summary ===
Scoring summary

Quarter	Time	Drive			Team	Scoring information	Score	
Quarter	Time	Plays	Yards	TOP	Team	Scoring information	Temple	Wyoming
1	8:41	13	90	6:19	Temple	Bernard Pierce 1-yard touchdown run, Brandon McManus kick good	7	0
2	14:28	9	69	4:11	Temple	Bernard Pierce 1-yard touchdown run, Brandon McManus kick good	14	0
2	10:21	6	35	1:58	Temple	Matt Brown 1-yard touchdown run, Brandon McManus kick good	21	0
2	0:37	11	62	5:00	Wyoming	Josh Doctson 21-yard touchdown reception from Brett Smith, Daniel Sullivan kick good	21	7
2	0:19	1	61	0:18	Temple	Rod Streater 61-yard touchdown reception from Chris Coyer, Brandon McManus kick good	28	7
3	1:22	12	60	6:34	Temple	34-yard field goal by Brandon McManus	31	7
4	12:50	7	47	2:48	Temple	37-yard field goal by Brandon McManus	34	7
4	3:22	13	56	8:23	Temple	34-yard field goal by Brandon McManus	37	7
4	0:03	10	71	3:19	Wyoming	Cody Sutton 14-yard touchdown reception from Brett Smith, 2-point run good	37	15
"TOP" = time of possession. For other American football terms, see Glossary of American football.							37	15

=== Statistics ===
Statistics	Temple	Wyoming
First downs	23	17
Total offense, plays - yards	63-424	63-267
Rushes-yards (net)	51-255	33-140
Passing yards (net)	167	127
Passes, Comp-Att-Int	8-12-0	20-30-3
Time of Possession	32:33	27:27
