= Todd Centeio =

American football player (born 1998)

Profile
- Position: Quarterback

Personal information
- Born: September 7, 1998 (age 28); Pembroke Pines, Florida, U.S.
- Listed height: 6 ft 0 in (1.83 m)
- Listed weight: 221 lb (100 kg)

Career information
- High school: William T. Dwyer (Palm Beach Gardens, Florida) (Note: He played his first two seasons at Royal Palm Beach in Royal Palm Beach, Florida)
- College: Temple (2017–2019); Colorado State (2020–2021); James Madison (2022)
- NFL draft: 2023: undrafted

Career history
- 2024: Orlando Guardians*
- 2024: Edmonton Elks*
- * Offseason or practice squad member only

Awards and highlights
- Second-team All-Sun Belt (2022); Sun Belt Offensive Player of the Year (2022)

Todd Anthony Centeio (born September 7, 1998) is an American former professional football quarterback. He played college football for the Temple Owls, Colorado State Rams, and James Madison Dukes.

== Early life ==
Centeio was born on September 7, 1998, in Pembroke Pines, Florida. During his freshman and sophomore year he attended and played high school football for Royal Palm Beach High School in Royal Palm Beach, Florida, before moving to Palm Beach Gardens, Florida, to attend and play for William T. Dwyer High School. In two seasons with Royal Palm Beach he threw for over 2,000 yards and 27 touchdowns, including 1,126 yards and fourteen touchdowns in his sophomore season. In his junior year he was diagnosed with Lupus and missed the season, not knowing if he would be able to play football again. During his senior season at William T. Dwyer he threw for 2,344 yards and 31 touchdowns while also earning First-Team All-Palm Beach Football 8A-6A honors. Centeio committed to play college football for Temple.

== College career ==
=== Temple ===
In 2017, Centeio appeared in one game for Temple; making his college football debut against UMass. He took a redshirt after not appearing in the final nine games of the season.

In 2018, Centeio entered the season as the third quarterback behind Anthony Russo and Frank Nutile. He served as the personal protector on the Owl's punt team. He threw his first-career touchdown pass against Maryland.

In 2019, Centeio threw a career-long 89-yard touchdown against Bucknell. He also made sporadic appearances throughout the season; leading scoring drives against East Carolina, No. 23 Memphis, and South Florida. Following the season, he announced he would transfer from Temple.

=== Colorado State ===
In 2020, Centeio transferred to Colorado State. He appeared in three games in his redshirt junior season while making his only start against Fresno State in the season opener. He completed fourteen of his 36 passed for 207 yards and one touchdown and one interception.

In 2021, Centeio started all twelve games for the Rams. He finished with a career-high in pass attempts, pass completions, yards, touchdowns, rushing attempts, rushing yards, and rushing touchdowns as the lead the team to a 3–9 record. Against Hawaii, he had a career-high 527 passing yards and five touchdown passes. Following the season, he announced he would transfer for a second time.

=== James Madison ===
In 2022, Centeio transferred to James Madison as a graduate transfer. He started ten of eleven games for the Dukes. In his debut he tied the school record for passing touchdowns with six while also having a career-high 110 rushing yards against Middle Tennessee. He set single-game passing records for James Madison as he threw for 468 yards while rushing for a career-high three touchdowns at Georgia Southern. Due to James Madison making the transition from FCS they were ineligible to play for the conference title, but they were given a bid to play in the 2022 Oyster Bowl against Old Dominion. He threw for 304 yards and had an 85.7 completion percentage in the team's 37–3 win. Following the season he was named Sun Belt Conference Offensive Player of the Year, Sun Belt Conference Newcomer of the Year, and Second-Team All-Sun Belt Conference.

=== Statistics ===
Year	Team	Games		Passing								Rushing			
Year	Team	GP	Record	Comp	Att	Pct	Yards	Avg	TD	Int	Rate	Att	Yards	Avg	TD
2017	Temple	1	0–0	2	2	100.0	20	10.0	0	0	184.0	4	-2	-0.5	0
2018	Temple	11	0–0	12	18	66.7	149	8.3	2	0	172.9	20	82	4.1	1
2019	Temple	10	0–0	34	51	66.7	444	9.8	5	1	168.2	47	155	3.3	0
2020	Colorado State	3	0–1	14	36	38.9	207	5.8	1	1	90.8	25	92	3.7	0
2021	Colorado State	12	3–9	229	380	60.3	2,958	7.8	15	10	133.4	131	439	3.4	2
2022	James Madison	10	8–2	181	284	63.7	2,697	9.5	25	5	169.0	95	366	3.9	7
Career		47	11−12	472	771	61.2	6,475	8.4	48	17	147.9	322	1,132	3.5	10

== Professional career ==
Pre-draft measurables
Height	Weight	Arm length	Hand span	40-yard dash	10-yard split	20-yard split	20-yard shuttle	Three-cone drill	Vertical jump	Broad jump
5 ft 11 in (1.80 m)	226 lb (103 kg)	31 in (0.79 m)	9 in (0.23 m)	4.85 s	1.60 s	2.76 s	4.34 s	7.20 s	34 1/2 in (0.88 m)	9 ft 3 in (2.82 m)
All values from Pro Day

=== Orlando Guardians ===
After going undrafted in the 2023 NFL draft, Centeio had his XFL playing rights claimed by the Orlando Guardians on June 28, 2023. He signed with the team on October 24. The Guardians folded when the XFL and USFL merged to create the United Football League (UFL).

=== Edmonton Elks ===
Centeio was signed by the Edmonton Elks of the Canadian Football League on January 25, 2024. He was released by Edmonton on May 17.
