= Jack Howell (American football) =

American football player

No. 17 – Colorado State Rams
- Position: Safety
- Class: Junior

Personal information
- Listed height: 5 ft 10 in (1.78 m)
- Listed weight: 193 lb (88 kg)

Career information
- High school: Hamilton (Chandler, Arizona)
- College: Colorado State (2021–present)

Awards and highlights
- 2× First-team All-Mountain West (2022, 2023)
- Stats at ESPN

Jack Howell is an American college football safety for the Colorado State Rams.

== Early life ==
A native of Fort Collins, Colorado, Howell initially attended Valor Christian High School in Colorado before transferring to Hamilton High School in Chandler, Arizona. As a junior, he had 11 rushing touchdowns and made eight catches for 112 yards on offense and recorded three interceptions as a safety on defense. Howell committed to play college football at the Colorado State University.

== College career ==
In 2021, Howell was named the Mountain West Conference freshman of the week twice: once for his performance against Toledo where he had nine tackles and a pass deflection, and again versus Hawaii where he totaled 11 tackles with one being for a loss. He finished the 2021 season with 64 tackles with four going for a loss, and an interception, earning FWAA Freshman All-American honors. Howell finished his breakout 2022 season with 108 tackles with three going for a loss, half a sack, three pass deflections, three interceptions, and a forced fumble. For his performance on the season, Howell was named a first-team All-Mountain West selection.

== Professional career ==
Pre-draft measurables
Height	Weight	Arm length	Hand span	40-yard dash	10-yard split	20-yard split	20-yard shuttle	Three-cone drill	Vertical jump	Broad jump	Bench press
5 ft 10 1/2 in (1.79 m)	193 lb (88 kg)	31 1/8 in (0.79 m)	9 3/8 in (0.24 m)	4.63 s	1.58 s	2.66 s	4.34 s	7.03 s	36.5 in (0.93 m)	9 ft 11 in (3.02 m)	9 reps
All values from Pro Day

== Personal life ==
Howell's sister is Jaelin who plays soccer, and his dad is former Super Bowl champion John Howell.
