= Steve Addazio =

American football player and coach (born 1959)

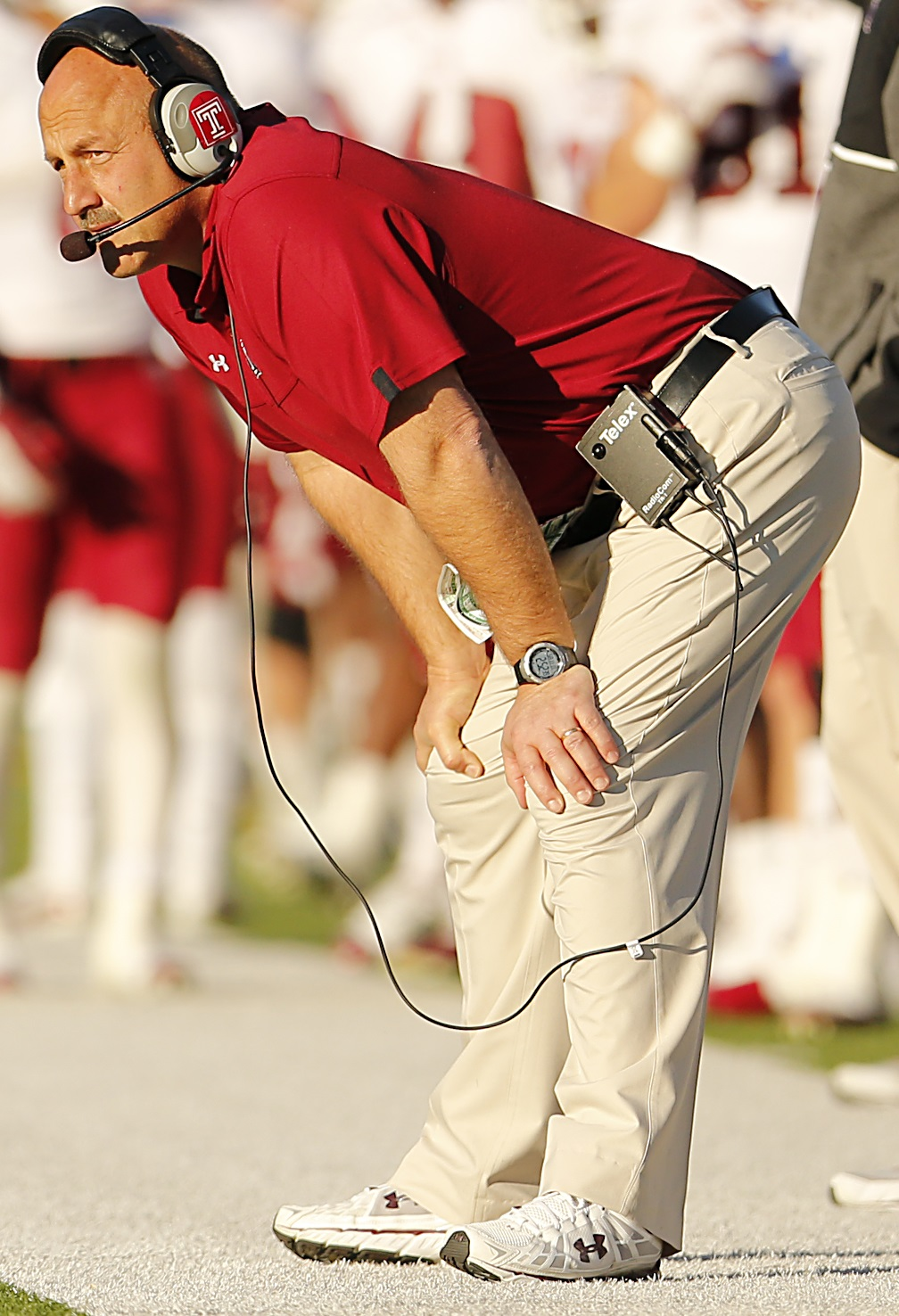
- Addazio in 2012 as Temple head coach

Biographical details
- Born: June 1, 1959 (age 67); Farmington, Connecticut, U.S.

Playing career
- 1978–1981: Central Connecticut

Coaching career (HC unless noted)
- 1985–1987: Western Connecticut State (OL/RC)
- 1988–1994: Cheshire HS (CT)
- 1995–1996: Syracuse (TE/assistant OL)
- 1997–1998: Syracuse (OL)
- 1999–2001: Notre Dame (T/TE/ST)
- 2002–2003: Indiana (OL)
- 2004: Indiana (OC/OL)
- 2005–2006: Florida (T/TE)
- 2007–2008: Florida (AHC/OL)
- 2009–2010: Florida (AHC/OC/OL)
- 2011–2012: Temple
- 2013–2019: Boston College
- 2020–2021: Colorado State
- 2022–2023: Texas A&M (OL)

Head coaching record
- Overall: 61–67 (college)
- Bowls: 2–3

Stephen Robert Addazio (born June 1, 1959) is an American college football coach, broadcaster, and former player. He became a color commentator for ESPN's college football broadcasts before the 2024 season. Before becoming a broadcaster, Addazio served as a high school and college coach for almost forty years, most recently as the offensive line coach for Texas A&M University. He served as the head football coach at Temple University from 2011 to 2012, Boston College from 2013 to 2019, and Colorado State University from 2020 to 2021. Before that, he was an offensive assistant for several college teams, including six seasons as an offensive line coach, assistant head coach, and offensive coordinator for the Florida Gators and was a part of two BCS National Championship Game-winning coaching staffs under head coach Urban Meyer.

== College career ==
Addazio was a four-year starter at Central Connecticut from 1978 to 1981 and earned tryouts with the NFL's New England Patriots, USFL's Jacksonville Bulls and CFL's Ottawa Rough Riders. He earned his bachelor's (1981) and master's (1985) degrees from Central Connecticut State University.

== Coaching career ==
=== High school coaching career ===
Addazio was the head coach of Cheshire High School in Connecticut from 1988 to 1994. Over twenty of his high school players earned places on the roster of college football programs. He led Cheshire to forty-nine consecutive victories, the second-longest streak in the nation. Cheshire also won three consecutive state titles and was ranked in the top twenty-five high school football teams in the country under Addazio.

=== Assistant college coach ===
Starting in 1995, Addazio moved to coaching in college football with stints as a position coach with Syracuse, Notre Dame, and Indiana. During 2004, he was offensive coordinator at Indiana during Gerry DiNardo's last season. In 2005, Addazio joined Urban Meyer's staff at Florida. Addazio and Meyer had previously coached together at Notre Dame during the 1999 and 2000 seasons under head coach Bob Davie. Addazio reportedly completed the logistical work to bring Aaron Hernandez to Florida.

With the announcement of Urban Meyer's resignation as the Gators' head coach on December 7, 2010, Addazio's future with the Gators came into question. On December 11, 2010, it was announced that Will Muschamp had accepted the head coach position for the Florida Gators.

=== Temple (2011–2012) ===
On December 23, 2010, it was announced that Addazio accepted the head coaching job at Temple, following Al Golden's resignation as the Owls' head coach to become the new head coach of the Miami Hurricanes football program.

Addazio achieved an impressive 9–4 record and secured a victory at the 2011 New Mexico Bowl in his first season with the Owls. However, Temple transitioned to the tougher Big East Conference during the offseason, which forced just a 4–7 finish without bowl eligibility in the following year.

=== Boston College (2013–2019) ===
On December 4, 2012, Boston College hired Addazio as its new football coach, following the firing of Frank Spaziani who coached the Eagles for four years to a 21–29 record.

==== 2013 ====
Following a 2–10 season under Spaziani, Addazio made an immediate impact in his first year as Head Coach of the Eagles. The team improved to 7–6 and secured a bowl appearance in the Independence Bowl; the program's first since 2010.

The feature component of Addazio's run-heavy offense, senior running back Andre Williams emerged as a standout player and rushed for 2,177 yards on the year. The mark earned him a top-10 spot on the all-time NCAA record list for most rushing yards in a season, and the Doak Walker Award as the best running back in the country. Williams finished 4th place in the Heisman Trophy voting and was also a Walter Camp Award finalist.

==== 2014 ====
Addazio coached the Eagles to another 7–6 record in his second season at the helm. Led by graduate transfer quarterback Tyler Murphy, who rushed for over 1,000 yards on the year, the Eagles secured their second straight bowl appearance at the 2014 Pinstripe Bowl. The highlight of the season came on September 13, as the Eagles upset the #9 ranked USC Trojans at home.

==== 2015 ====
Addazio and Boston College suffered a setback in 2015, as the Eagles finished with a 3–9 record and went winless in the ACC. On November 21, they faced off against rival Notre Dame at Fenway Park in Boston as a part of Notre Dame's Shamrock Series.

==== 2016 ====
In his fourth year with the Eagles, Addazio finished with a 7–6 record and a bowl game victory at the 2016 Quick Lane Bowl. The win was the Eagles' first postseason victory since 2007.

==== 2017 ====
Addazio's fifth season again saw the team finish with a 7–6 record, with the team earning a bowl appearance at the 2017 Pinstripe Bowl. On November 18, the Eagles appeared in a game played at Fenway Park, where they defeated the UConn Huskies.

==== 2018 ====
The 2018 season brought the Eagles a 7–5 record and saw Boston College's appearance the top-25 rankings for the first time since 2009. Additionally, a bowl appearance at the 2018 First Responder Bowl would have given them the opportunity for an 8th victory (and to break the 7–6 trend). However, the game was delayed during the first quarter due to severe lightning strikes and ultimately ruled a no-contest.

The Eagles appeared in the rankings twice during the year, the first occurrence coming after a strong 3–0 start earned them #23 in the country. However, they quickly dropped back out after a loss to unranked Purdue. Boston College won three of their following four games and regained a ranking of No. 24. They improved to No. 17 after a road victory against Virginia Tech, then faced off against rival and No. 2 ranked Clemson. A loss against the Tigers dropped the Eagles down to No. 22, and a further loss against unranked Florida State pushed them out of the top-25. Their final game of the season against rival and No. 19 ranked Syracuse resulted in a loss and marked the final game in a 3-game losing streak to close the season.

On December 18, 2018, Addazio signed a contract extension through 2020 which extended his previous six-year deal by two years.

===== DazQuest =====
On October 10, 2018, the Boston College satirical newspaper The New England Classic released DazQuest, an Addazio-themed video game. Created with the interactive fiction software Twine, the game allows players to assume the role of Addazio as he embarks on a comedic adventure to retrieve the stolen campus statue of Doug Flutie. The game also features cameos from other Boston College personnel such as hockey coach Jerry York, athletic director Martin Jarmond, and campus mascot Baldwin the Eagle. DazQuest's creators have said they looked to other comedy/adventure games such as The Secret of Monkey Island and Undertale as inspiration for their game, and on October 14 it received a five-star review from the student newspaper The Heights.

==== 2019 ====
In Addazio's final year with Boston College, the Eagles finished the regular season with a 6–6 record, earning bowl eligibility in their final game of the season. As a result of the season, Addazio was fired on December 1, 2019, before the team's bowl game appearance at the Birmingham Bowl.

A highlight of the season was running-back A. J. Dillon achieving a school record for career rushing yards at 4,382 in just three seasons.

=== Colorado State (2020–2021) ===
Ten days after his firing from Boston College, Addazio was hired as the head coach at Colorado State University to replace Mike Bobo.

==== 2020 ====
Addazio's first year with the Rams was impacted by the COVID-19 pandemic and saw the schedule reduced to just eight games. Only half of the scheduled competitions would be played due to virus protocols. In the short season, the team achieved a 1–3 record.

==== 2021 ====
Returning to a full-season schedule, second-year coach Addazio led the Rams to a 3–9 record. After starting the year 3–3, the team lost its final six games and did not achieve bowl eligibility. Addazio was ejected during the first half of the final game of the season against Nevada, by rule after receiving two unsportsmanlike conduct penalties; he is the second coach to be ejected following the NCAA rule change implemented in 2016.

Addazio was fired on December 2, 2021, after two seasons at Colorado State where he posted a total record of 4–12.

=== Texas A&M (2022–2023) ===
On January 21, 2022, Addazio was hired by Texas A&M to be their offensive line coach under Jimbo Fisher.

Addazio was fired along with the rest of the coaching staff after Fisher was fired during the 2023 season.

== Broadcasting career ==
In August 2024, Addazio was hired by ESPN to be a color analyst on their college football broadcasts.

== Head coaching record ==
=== College ===
Year	Team	Overall	Conference	Standing	Bowl/playoffs
Temple Owls (Mid-American Conference) (2011)
2011	Temple	9–4	5–3	2nd (East)	W New Mexico
Temple Owls (Big East Conference) (2012)
2012	Temple	4–7	2–5	T–6th	
Temple:		13–11	7–8		
Boston College Eagles (Atlantic Coast Conference) (2013–2019)
2013	Boston College	7–6	4–4	T–3rd (Atlantic)	L Independence
2014	Boston College	7–6	4–4	4th (Atlantic)	L Pinstripe
2015	Boston College	3–9	0–8	7th (Atlantic)	
2016	Boston College	7–6	2–6	T–6th (Atlantic)	W Quick Lane
2017	Boston College	7–6	4–4	T–3rd (Atlantic)	L Pinstripe
2018	Boston College	7–5	4–4	4th (Atlantic)	First Responder (Note: The First Responder Bowl was cancelled due to inclement weather and ruled a no contest.)
2019	Boston College	6–6	4–4	T–3rd (Atlantic)	Birmingham (Note: Fired upon conclusion of the regular season, before Bowl game took place.)
Boston College:		44–44	22–34		
Colorado State Rams (Mountain West Conference) (2020–2021)
2020	Colorado State	1–3	1–3	10th	
2021	Colorado State	3–9	2–6	T–4th (Mountain)	
Colorado State:		4–12	3–9		
Total:		61–67			
^{†}Indicates Bowl Coalition, Bowl Alliance, BCS, or CFP / New Years' Six bowl.
