= 2019 Colorado State Rams football team =

American college football season

2019 Colorado State Rams football
- Conference: Mountain West Conference
- Mountain Division
- Record: 4–8 (3–5 MW)
- Head coach: Mike Bobo (5th season)
- Offensive coordinator: Dave Johnson (2nd season)
- Offensive scheme: Pro spread
- Defensive coordinator: John Jancek (2nd season)
- Base defense: 4–3
- Home stadium: Canvas Stadium

Uniform
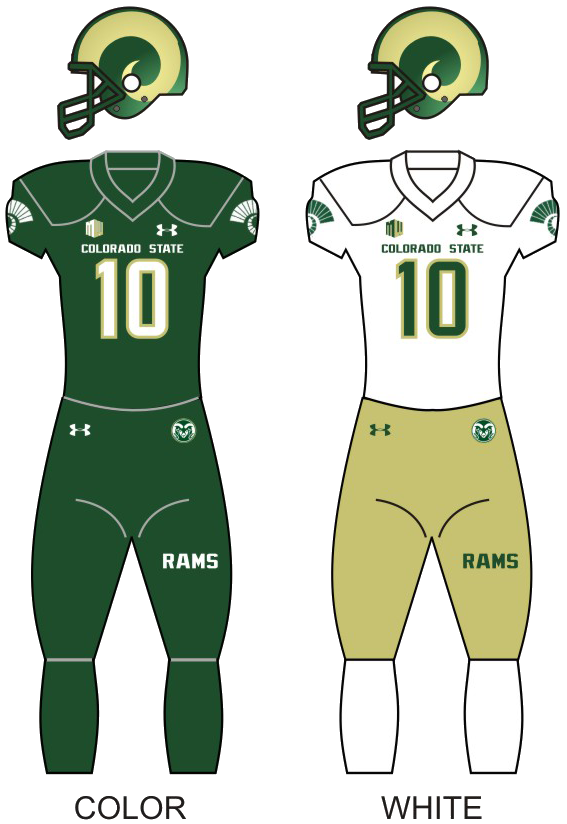

2019 Mountain West Conference football standings
	Conf.			Overall
Team	W		L	W		L
Mountain Division
No. 23 Boise State xy$	8	–	0	12	–	2
No. 22 Air Force	7	–	1	11	–	2
Utah State	6	–	2	7	–	6
Wyoming	4	–	4	8	–	5
Colorado State	3	–	5	4	–	8
New Mexico	0	–	8	2	–	10
West Division
Hawaii xy	5	–	3	10	–	5
San Diego State x	5	–	3	10	–	3
Nevada	4	–	4	7	–	6
San Jose State	2	–	6	5	–	7
UNLV	2	–	6	4	–	8
Fresno State	2	–	6	4	–	8
Championship: Boise State 31, Hawaii 10
$ – Conference champion; x – Division champion/co-champions; y – Championship game participant; Rankings from AP Poll

The 2019 Colorado State Rams football team represented Colorado State University in the 2019 NCAA Division I FBS football season. The Rams were led by fifth-year head coach Mike Bobo and played their home games at Sonny Lubick Field at Canvas Stadium in Fort Collins, Colorado as members of the Mountain Division of the Mountain West Conference. The Rams finished the season 4–8, 3–5 in Mountain West play to finish in fifth place in the Mountain Division.

On December 4, head coach Mike Bobo agreed to step down as head coach. He finished at Colorado State with a five-year record of 28–35.

== Preseason ==
=== Award watch lists ===
Listed in the order that they were released

Award	Player	Position	Year
John Mackey Award	Cameron Butler	TE	JR
John Mackey Award	Trey McBride	TE	SO
Ray Guy Award	Ryan Stonehouse	P	JR
Wuerffel Trophy	Adam Prentice	RB	JR

=== Mountain West media days ===
The Mountain West media days were held from July 23−24, 2019 at Green Valley Ranch in Henderson, NV.

==== Media poll ====
The preseason poll was released at the Mountain West media days on July 23, 2019. The Rams were predicted to finish in fifth place in the MW Mountain Division.

==== Preseason All-Mountain West Team ====
The Rams had one player selected to the preseason All−Mountain West Team.

Specialists

Ryan Stonehouse – P

== Schedule ==
Date	Time	Opponent	Site	TV	Result	Attendance
August 30	8:00 p.m.	vs. Colorado*	Broncos Stadium at Mile High; Denver, CO (Rocky Mountain Showdown)	ESPN	L 31–52	66,997
September 7	2:00 p.m.	Western Illinois*	Canvas Stadium; Fort Collins, CO	AT&T RM	W 38–13	19,435
September 14	2:00 p.m.	at Arkansas*	Donald W. Reynolds Razorback Stadium; Fayetteville, AR	SECN	L 34–55	55,583
September 21	8:15 p.m.	Toledo*	Canvas Stadium; Fort Collins, CO	ESPN2	L 35–41	24,464
September 28	5:30 p.m.	at Utah State	Maverik Stadium; Logan, UT	CBSSN	L 24–34	20,017
October 5	8:00 p.m.	San Diego State^{†}	Canvas Stadium; Fort Collins, CO	ESPN2	L 10–24	29,767
October 11	6:00 p.m.	at New Mexico	Dreamstyle Stadium; Albuquerque, NM	CBSSN	W 35–21	15,393
October 26	5:30 p.m.	at Fresno State	Bulldog Stadium; Fresno, CA	ESPNU	W 41–31	32,890
November 2	1:30 p.m.	UNLV	Canvas Stadium; Fort Collins, CO	AT&T RM	W 37–17	24,103
November 16	5:00 p.m.	Air Force	Canvas Stadium; Fort Collins, CO (Ram–Falcon Trophy)	ESPN2	L 21–38	24,914
November 22	7:30 p.m.	at Wyoming	War Memorial Stadium; Laramie, WY (Border War)	ESPN2	L 7–17	21,152
November 29	1:30 p.m.	No. 20 Boise State	Canvas Stadium; Fort Collins, CO	CBSSN	L 24–31	12,324
*Non-conference game; ^{†}Homecoming; Rankings from AP Poll released prior to the game; All times are in Mountain time

Schedule source:

== Game summaries ==
=== Vs. Colorado ===
Colorado State Rams vs. Colorado Buffaloes (Rocky Mountain Showdown)

Quarter	1	2	3	4	Total
Rams	7	14	3	7	31
Buffaloes	7	17	14	14	52

at Broncos Stadium at Mile High, Denver, CO

- Date: August 30, 2019
- Game time: 8:00 p.m. MDT
- TV: ESPN
- ESPN – Colorado State Rams vs. Colorado Buffaloes (Rocky Mountain Showdown) Preview

Game information

First Quarter
Second Quarter
Third Quarter
Fourth Quarter

Passing

- CSU –
- CU –

Rushing

- CSU –
- CU –

Receiving

- CSU –
- CU –

=== Western Illinois ===
Western Illinois Leathernecks at Colorado State Rams

Quarter	1	2	3	4	Total
Leathernecks	3	3	0	7	13
Rams	14	14	7	3	38

at Canvas Stadium, Fort Collins, CO

- Date: September 7, 2019
- Game time: 2:00 p.m. MDT
- ESPN – Western Illinois Leathernecks at Colorado State Rams Preview

Game information

First Quarter
Second Quarter
Third Quarter
Fourth Quarter

Passing

- WIU –
- CSU –

Rushing

- WIU –
- CSU –

Receiving

- WIU –
- CSU –

=== At Arkansas ===
Colorado State Rams at Arkansas Razorbacks

Quarter	1	2	3	4	Total
Rams	14	10	10	0	34
Razorbacks	24	3	7	21	55

at Donald W. Reynolds Razorback Stadium, Fayetteville, AR

- Date: September 14, 2019
- Game time: 3:00 p.m. CDT
- Game weather: Clear • Temperature: 87 °F (31 °C) • Wind: S 9 mph
- Game attendance: 55,583
- Referee: Marc Curles
- TV announcers (SECN): Dave Neal (play-by-play), D. J. Shockley (color), Dawn Davenport (sideline)
- ESPN – Colorado State Rams at Arkansas Razorbacks Preview

Game information

First Quarter

- (14:42) CSU – Marvin Kinsey Jr. 75 yard rush, Cayden Camper kick (Drive: 2 plays, 75 yards, 0:18; Colorado State 7–0)
- (13:00) ARK – Trey Knox 24 yard pass from Nick Starkel, Connor Limpert kick (Drive: 5 plays, 75 yards, 1:42; Tied 7–7)
- (7:54) ARK – Chase Harrell 14 yard pass from Nick Starkel, Connor Limpert kick (Drive: 11 yards, 82 yards, 3:34; Arkansas 14–7)
- (5:54) ARK – Rakeem Boyd 59 yard rush, Connor Limpert kick (Drive: 2 plays, 75 yards, 0:25; Arkansas 21–7)
- (3:27) CSU – Warren Jackson 14 yard pass from Collin Hill, Cayden Camper kick (Drive: 5 plays, 75 yards, 2:32; Arkansas 21–14)
- (1:02) ARK – Connor Limpert 54 yard field goal (Drive: 6 plays, 28 yards, 2:25; Arkansas 24–14)

Second Quarter

- (11:41) ARK – Connor Limpert 22 yard field goal (Drive: 9 plays, 34 yards, 3:13; Arkansas 27–14)
- (7:31) CSU – Collin Hill 1 yard rush, Cayden Camper kick (Drive: 5 plays, 40 yards, 1:55; Arkansas 27–21)
- (0:04) CSU – Cayden Camper 46 yard field goal (Drive: 10 plays, 52 yards, 2:37; Arkansas 27–24)

Third Quarter

- (13:07) ARK – Rakeem Boyd 4 yard rush, Connor Limpert kick (Drive: 8 plays, 75 yards, 1:53; Arkansas 34–24)
- (5:45) CSU – Cayden Camper 21 yard field goal (Drive: 15 plays, 72 yards, 7:22; Arkansas 34–27)
- (2:26) CSU – Dante Wright 75 yard pass from Patrick O'Brien, Cayden Camper kick (Drive: 3 plays, 72 yards, 1:44; Tied 34–34)

Fourth Quarter

- (8:52) ARK – Devwah Whaley 5 yard rush, Connor Limpert kick (Drive: 9 plays, 68 yards, 2:43; Arkansas 41–34)
- (5:32) ARK – Cheyenne O'Grady 62 yard pass from Nick Starkel, Connor Limpert kick (Drive: 4 plays, 74 yards, 2:10; Arkansas 48–34)
- (3:31) ARK – LaDarrius Bishop 25 yard fumble return, Connor Limpert kick (Arkansas 55–34)

Passing

- CSU – Patrick O'Brien – 7/10, 106 yards, 1 TD
- ARK – Nick Starkel – 20/35, 305 yards, 3 TD

Rushing

- CSU – Marvin Kinsey Jr. – 20 carries, 180 yards, 1 TD
- ARK – Rakeem Boyd – 20 yards, 122 yards, 2 TD

Receiving

- CSU – Dante Wright – 4 receptions, 97 yards, 1 TD
- ARK – Treylon Burks – 4 receptions, 92 yards

=== Toledo ===
Toledo Rockets at Colorado State Rams

Quarter	1	2	3	4	Total
Rockets	7	7	21	6	41
Rams	7	6	14	8	35

at Canvas Stadium, Fort Collins, CO

- Date: September 21, 2019
- Game time: TBA
- TV: ESPN Nets
- ESPN – Toledo Rockets at Colorado State Rams Preview

Game information

First Quarter
Second Quarter
Third Quarter
Fourth Quarter

Passing

- TOL –
- CSU –

Rushing

- TOL –
- CSU –

Receiving

- TOL –
- CSU –

=== At Utah State ===
Colorado State Rams at Utah State Aggies

Quarter	1	2	3	4	Total
Rams	7	14	3	0	24
Aggies	7	17	3	7	34

at Maverik Stadium, Logan, UT

- Date: September 28, 2019
- Game time: 5:30 p.m. MDT
- TV: CBSSN
- ESPN – Colorado State Rams at Utah State Aggies Preview

Game information

First Quarter
Second Quarter
Third Quarter
Fourth Quarter

Passing

- CSU –
- USU –

Rushing

- CSU –
- USU –

Receiving

- CSU –
- USU –

=== San Diego State ===
San Diego State Aztecs at Colorado State Rams

Quarter	1	2	3	4	Total
Aztecs	3	7	7	7	24
Rams	3	0	0	7	10

at Canvas Stadium, Fort Collins, CO

- Date: October 5, 2019
- Game time: TBA
- TV: ESPN Nets
- ESPN – San Diego State Aztecs at Colorado State Rams Preview

Game information

First Quarter
Second Quarter
Third Quarter
Fourth Quarter

Passing

- SDSU –
- CSU –

Rushing

- SDSU –
- CSU –

Receiving

- SDSU –
- CSU –

=== At New Mexico ===
Colorado State Rams at New Mexico Lobos

Quarter	1	2	3	4	Total
Rams	7	14	7	7	35
Lobos	6	8	0	7	21

at Dreamstyle Stadium, Albuquerque, NM

- Date: October 11, 2019
- Game time: 6:00 p.m. MDT
- TV: CBSSN
- ESPN – Colorado State Rams at New Mexico Lobos Preview

Game information

First Quarter
Second Quarter
Third Quarter
Fourth Quarter

Passing

- CSU –
- UNM –

Rushing

- CSU –
- UNM –

Receiving

- CSU –
- UNM –

=== At Fresno State ===
Colorado State Rams at Fresno State Bulldogs

Quarter	1	2	3	4	Total
Rams	14	7	3	17	41
Bulldogs	7	7	14	3	31

at Bulldog Stadium, Fresno, CA

- Date: October 26, 2019
- Game time: 4:30 p.m. PDT
- TV: ESPN Nets
- ESPN – Colorado State Rams at Fresno State Bulldogs Preview

Game information

First Quarter
Second Quarter
Third Quarter
Fourth Quarter

Passing

- CSU –
- FRES –

Rushing

- CSU –
- FRES –

Receiving

- CSU –
- FRES –

=== UNLV ===
UNLV Rebels at Colorado State Rams

Quarter	1	2	3	4	Total
Rebels	0	0	3	14	17
Rams	21	3	3	10	37

at Canvas Stadium, Fort Collins, CO

- Date: November 2, 2019
- Game time: 1:38 p.m. MDT
- Game weather: Temperature: 44 °F (7 °C) • Weather: Clear and Sunny • Wind: E 5 MPH
- Game attendance: 24,103
- Referee: Michael VanderVelde
- TV announcers (AT&T RM): Drew Goodman, Sherdrick Bonner, Brad Thompson (sideline) and Taylor McGregor (sideline)
- ESPN – UNLV Rebels at Colorado State Rams Preview

Game information

First Quarter
Second Quarter
Third Quarter
Fourth Quarter

Passing

- UNLV –
- CSU –

Rushing

- UNLV –
- CSU –

Receiving

- UNLV –
- CSU –

=== Air Force ===
Air Force Falcons at Colorado State Rams (Battle for the Ram–Falcon Trophy)

Quarter	1	2	3	4	Total
Falcons	0	10	0	28	38
Rams	14	0	0	7	21

at Canvas Stadium, Fort Collins, CO

- Date: November 16, 2019
- Game time: 5:00 p.m. MST
- Game weather: Temperature: 42 °F (6 °C) • Wind: 23 mph • Weather: Cloudy and Windy
- Game attendance: 24,914
- Referee: David Alvarez
- TV announcers (ESPN2): Roy Philpott (play-by-play), Kelly Stouffer (analyst) & Lauren Sisler (sideline)
- ESPN – Air Force Falcons at Colorado State Rams (Ram–Falcon Trophy) Preview

Game information

First Quarter

- (09:03) CSU TD – Trey McBride 4-yard pass from Patrick O'Brien, Maxwell Poduska kick
  Drive: 14 plays, 75 yards, 5:57; Colorado State 7–0
- (03:32) CSU TD – Mohamed Kamara 63-yard fumble return, Maxwell Poduska kick
  Drive: 0 plays, 0 yards, 0:00; Colorado State 14–0

Second Quarter

- (06:42) AF TD – Benjamin Waters 31-yard pass from Donald Hammond III, Jake Koehnke kick
  Drive: 5 plays, 65 yards, 2:18; Colorado State 14–7
- (01:05) AF FG – Jake Koehnke 31-yard field goal
  Drive: 7 plays, 21 yards, 2:43; Colorado State 14–10

Third Quarter
No scoring
Fourth Quarter

- (13:44) AF TD – Geraud Sanders 50-yard pass from Donald Hammond III, Jake Koehnke kick
  Drive: 7 plays, 75 yards, 2:36; Air Force 17–14
- (07:21) AF TD – Benjamin Waters 28-yard pass from Donald Hammond III, Jake Koehnke kick
  Drive: 8 plays, 58 yards, 4:41; Air Force 24–14
- (06:36) CSU TD – Dante Wright 17-yard pass from Patrick O'Brien, Maxwell Poduska kick
  Drive: 2 plays, 75 yards, 0:45; Air Force 24–21
- (02:32) AF TD – Donald Hammond III 1-yard rush, Jake Koehnke kick
  Drive: 8 plays, 75 yards, 4:04; Air Force 31–21
- (01:22) AF TD – Zane Lewis 99-yard interception return, Jake Koehnke kick
  Drive: 0 plays, 0 yards, 0:00; Air Force 38–21

Passing

- AF – Donald Hammond III: 5/11, 126 yards, 3 TD, 1 INT
- CSU – Patrick O'Brien: 28/43, 347 yards, 2 TD, 1 INT

Rushing

- AF – Kadin Remsberg: 17 carries, 101 yards
- CSU – Marcus McElroy: 11 carries, 51 yards

Receiving

- AF – Benjamin Waters: 2 receptions, 59 yards, 2 TD
- CSU – Warren Jackson: 8 receptions, 88 yards

=== At Wyoming ===
Colorado State Rams at Wyoming Cowboys (The Border War)

Quarter	1	2	3	4	Total
Rams	0	7	0	0	7
Cowboys	0	7	7	3	17

at War Memorial Stadium, Laramie, WY

- Date: November 22, 2019
- Game time: 7:30 p.m. MST
- Game attendance: 21,152
- TV: ESPN2
- ESPN – Colorado State Rams at Wyoming Cowboys (Border War) Preview

Game information

First Quarter

No scoring

Second Quarter

- (11:52) WYO – Tyler Vander Waal 1-yard touchdown run, Cooper Rothe kick
  Drive: 11 plays, 93 yards, 5:30; Wyoming 7–0
- (4:52) CSU – Warren Jackson 4-yard touchdown receptions from Patrick O'Brien, Braxton Davis kick
  Drive: 13 plays, 75 yards, 7:00; Tied 7–7

Third Quarter

- (6:04) WYO – Levi Williams 1-yard touchdown run, Cooper Rothe kick
  Drive: 10 plays, 44 yards, 5:41; Wyoming 14–7

Fourth Quarter

- (3:33) WYO – Cooper Rothe 48-yard field goal
  Drive: 11 plays, 28 yards, 5:44; Wyoming 17–7

Passing

- CSU – Patrick O'Brien – 17/29, 217 yards, TD, INT
- WYO – Tyler Vander Waal – 6/13, 56 yards

Rushing

- CSU – Jaylen Thomas – 14 carries, 23 yards
- WYO – Xazavian Valladay – 27 carries, 154 yards

Receiving

- CSU – Warren Jackson – 6 receptions, 95 yards, TD
- WYO – Austin Conway – 3 receptions, 35 yards

=== Boise State ===
Boise State Broncos at Colorado State Rams

Quarter	1	2	3	4	Total
No. 20 Broncos	7	17	0	7	31
Rams	7	7	7	3	24

at Canvas Stadium, Fort Collins, CO

- Date: November 29, 2019
- Game time: 1:30 p.m. MST
- Game weather: 24 °F (−4 °C) • Weather: Overcast, Cold • Wind: 10 MPH NW
- Game attendance: 12,324
- Referee: M. VanderVelde
- TV announcers (CBSSN): Rich Waltz, Aaron Murray
- ESPN – Boise State Broncos at Colorado State Rams Preview

Game information

First Quarter

- (11:12) CSU – Jaylen Thomas 3-yard run, Braxton Davis kick (Drive: 9 plays, 75 yards, 3:48; Colorado State 7–0)
- (2:34) BSU – Garrett Collingham 2-yard run, Eric Sachse kick (Drive: 17 plays, 73 yards, 8:32; Tied 7–7)

Second Quarter

- (14:55) BSU – CT Thomas 5-yard pass from Jaylon Henderson, Eric Sachse kick (Drive: 5 yards, 20 yards, 2:31; Boise State 14–7)
- (8:47) CSU – Warren Jackson 16-yard pass from Patrick O'Brien, Braxton Davis kick (Drive: 12 plays, 81 yards, 6:04; Tied 14–14)
- (1:16) BSU – Garrett Collingham 3-yard pass from Jaylon Henderson, Eric Sachse kick (Drive: 14 plays, 79 yards, 7:25; Boise State 21–14)
- (0:18) BSU – Eric Sachse 39-yard field goal (Drive: 4 plays, 4 yards, 0:23; Boise State 24–14)

Third Quarter

- (3:49) CSU – Trey McBride 28-yard pass from Patrick O'Brien, Braxton Davis kick (Drive: 9 plays, 80 yards, 3:30; Boise State 24–21)

Fourth Quarter

- (11:26) BSU – Jaylon Henderson 1-yard run, Eric Sachse kick (Drive: 5 plays, 76 yards, 2:19; Boise State 31–21)
- (8:02) CSU – Braxton Davis 34-yard field goal (Drive: 9 plays, 56 yards, 3:18; Boise State 31–24)

Passing

- BSU – Jaylon Henderson – 26/36, 253 yards, 2 TD
- CSU – Patrick O'Brien – 26/40, 175 yards

Rushing

- BSU – George Holani – 18 carries, 42 yards
- CSU – Kentrail Moran – 9 carries, 36 yards, TD

Receiving

- BSU – John Hightower – 7 receptions, 103 yards
- CSU – Trey McBride – 9 receptions, 101 yards, TD
