= Manny Jones =

American football player (born 1999)

Profile
- Position: Defensive tackle

Personal information
- Born: June 6, 1999 (age 27); Cartersville, Georgia, U.S.
- Listed height: 6 ft 4 in (1.93 m)
- Listed weight: 290 lb (132 kg)

Career information
- High school: Woodland (GA)
- College: Colorado State (2017–2021)
- NFL draft: 2022: undrafted

Career history
- Arizona Cardinals (2022); Pittsburgh Steelers (2023)*; New England Patriots (2023)*; New York Jets (2023–2024)*
- * Offseason or practice squad member only

Career NFL statistics as of 2023
- Total tackles: 6
- Stats at Pro Football Reference

Emmanuel Jones (born June 6, 1999) is an American football defensive tackle. He played college football for the Colorado State Rams and was signed by the Arizona Cardinals as an undrafted free agent in 2022.

== Professional career ==
Pre-draft measurables
Height	Weight	Arm length	Hand span	40-yard dash	10-yard split	20-yard split	20-yard shuttle	Three-cone drill	Vertical jump	Broad jump	Bench press
6 ft 2 5/8 in (1.90 m)	280 lb (127 kg)	32 3/8 in (0.82 m)	8 5/8 in (0.22 m)	4.93 s	1.69 s	2.77 s	4.77 s	7.48 s	31.0 in (0.79 m)	9 ft 8 in (2.95 m)	22 reps
All values from Pro Day

=== Arizona Cardinals ===
After going unselected in the 2022 NFL draft, the Arizona Cardinals signed Jones as an undrafted free agent. He was waived at the final roster cuts, on August 30, 2022, and signed to the Cardinals' practice squad the next day.

Jones was elevated to the team's active roster on November 5. He made his professional debut the next day against the Seattle Seahawks in the team's week 9 game He was placed back on the practice squad on November 7. Jones was again elevated to the main roster, playing in the team's week 15 game before being placed back in the practice squad. He was elevated for the final time on December 28, playing in the Cardinals' week 17 and 18 games. Jones played, in total, four games for the Cardinals in 2022.

On May 15, 2023, Jones was released by the Arizona Cardinals.

=== Pittsburgh Steelers ===
On May 16, 2023, Jones was claimed off waivers by the Pittsburgh Steelers. He was waived on August 28, 2023.

=== New England Patriots ===
On September 27, 2023, Jones was signed to the practice squad of the New England Patriots. The Patriots released him on October 18, 2023.

=== New York Jets ===
On December 19, 2023, Jones was signed to the New York Jets practice squad. He signed a reserve/future contract on January 8, 2024. He was waived on May 6, 2024.
