= Barry Wesley =

American football player (born 1999)

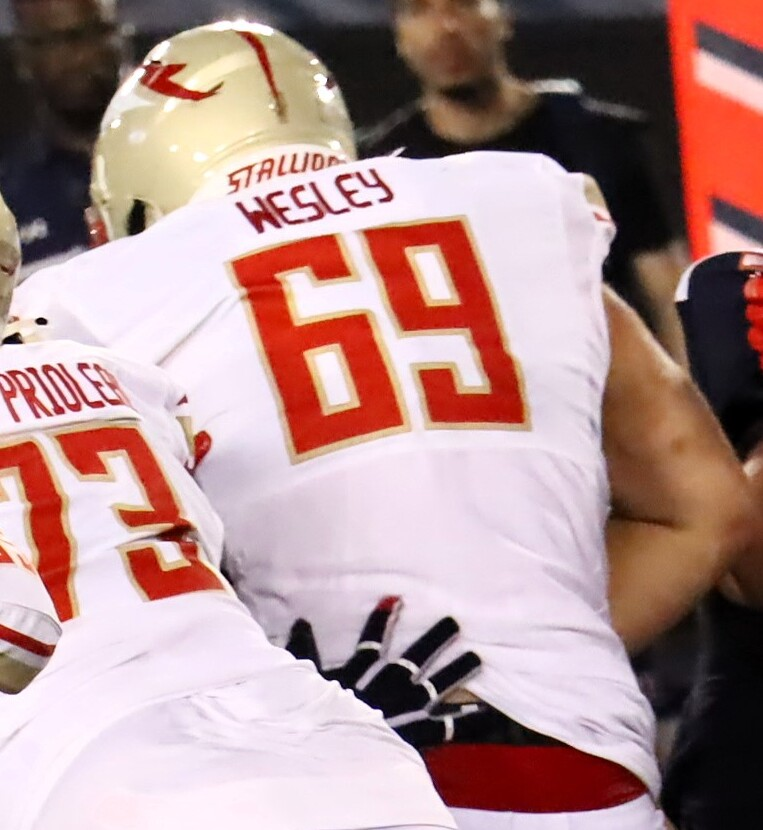
- Wesley in 2025

Profile
- Position: Offensive tackle

Personal information
- Born: July 14, 1999 (age 27); Morrison, Colorado, U.S.
- Listed height: 6 ft 7 in (2.01 m)
- Listed weight: 310 lb (141 kg)

Career information
- High school: Bear Creek (Lakewood, Colorado)
- College: Colorado State (2018-2021)
- NFL draft: 2022: undrafted

Career history
- Massachusetts Pirates (2022)*; Seattle Sea Dragons (2023); Atlanta Falcons (2023–2024)*; Birmingham Stallions (2025); New Orleans Saints (2025–2026)*
- * Offseason or practice squad member only
- Stats at Pro Football Reference

Barry Wesley (born July 14, 1999) is an American professional football offensive tackle. He played college football for the Colorado State Rams.

== College career ==
Wesley played four seasons at Colorado State, starting 38 games playing both tackle and guard. In 2019, he received the Albert C. Yates Student Leadership Award.

== Professional career ==
Pre-draft measurables
Height	Weight	Arm length	Hand span	Wingspan	40-yard dash	10-yard split	20-yard split	20-yard shuttle	Three-cone drill	Vertical jump	Broad jump	Bench press
6 ft 6 3/8 in (1.99 m)	312 lb (142 kg)	33 1/2 in (0.85 m)	9 7/8 in (0.25 m)	6 ft 7 5/8 in (2.02 m)	5.47 s	1.87 s	3.04 s	4.84 s	7.93 s	24.5 in (0.62 m)	9 ft 0 in (2.74 m)	21 reps
All values from Pro Day

=== Massachusetts Pirates ===
After going undrafted in the 2022 NFL draft, Wesley signed with the Massachusetts Pirates of the Indoor Football League (IFL) on December 14, 2022.

=== Seattle Sea Dragons ===
In January 2023, Wesley signed with the Seattle Sea Dragons of the XFL.

=== Atlanta Falcons ===
On May 15, 2023, Wesley signed with the Atlanta Falcons. He was released on August 29, but was subsequently re-signed to the practice squad. Wesley was placed on the practice squad injured reserve list on September 5.

Following the end of the regular season, Wesley signed a reserve/future contract with Atlanta on January 10, 2024. Wesley was released by the Falcons as part of final roster cuts on August 27.

=== Birmingham Stallions ===
On November 14, 2024, Wesley signed with the Birmingham Stallions of the United Football League (UFL).

=== New Orleans Saints ===
On June 18, 2025, Wesley signed with the New Orleans Saints. He was placed on injured reserve to begin the regular season due to a hip injury. Wesley was activated on November 25, ahead of the Saints' Week 13 matchup against the Miami Dolphins. He was waived on December 2 and re-signed to the practice squad two days later. Wesley signed a reserve/future contract with New Orleans on January 5, 2026.

On August 30, 2026, Wesley was placed on season–ending injured reserve. On September 2, Wesley was waived by New Orleans with an injury settlement.
