= Cayden Camper =

American football placekicker

Profile
- Position: Placekicker
- Class: Senior

Personal information
- Born: Pueblo, Colorado
- Listed height: 6 ft 4 in (1.93 m)
- Listed weight: 215 lb (98 kg)

Career information
- High school: Pueblo County (Pueblo)

Awards and highlights
- Colorado State Single Game School Record Holder - Field Goals Made: 6 (Oct. 9, 2021); Colorado State Single Season School Record Holder - Field Goals Made: 25 (2021)

Cayden Camper is an American football placekicker who last played for the Colorado State Rams.

== Early life and education ==
Camper attended Pueblo County High School where he played placekicker and punter. He was named the special teams Player of the Year for the Hornets in 2018, as well as being named a first-team all-state punter.

== College career ==
=== 2019 & 2020 season ===
In 2019, Camper joined the CSU football team as a freshman walk-on. He made his first collegiate appearance on September 14, 2019 at Arkansas, where he scored two field goals and converted 4/4 extra points. Camper finished the season scoring 7 field goals on 13 attempts, as well as making all 18 attempted extra points.

Camper appeared in only one game in his sophomore 2020 season, which was heavily condensed as a result of the COVID-19 pandemic.

=== 2021 season ===
Camper had his breakout season in 2021, his junior year at Colorado State University, largely in part due to the Rams' struggle to score from within the red zone, leading to the offense to often settle for close field goals rather than touchdowns. Through six games - half of the 2021 season - Camper had already made 17 field goals on 21 attempts, as well as completing all 13 extra points.

On October 9, 2021, in CSU's 2021 homecoming game against San Jose State, Camper made six field goals on six attempts - including a career-long 53-yarder - breaking Colorado State's single game record for made field goals. He also converted two extra points in the Rams' 32-14 victory over the Spartans. He continued his hot streak the following week against New Mexico, scoring five field goals on six attempts, as well as 3/3 extra points, in the Rams' 36-7 blowout win over the Lobos. Between field goals and extra points, Camper scored 38 points in two weeks.

Camper won Mountain West special teams Player of the Week for weeks 3 and 5. He also won the Lou Groza Award Star of the Week for weeks 3, 5 and 6. He broke the Colorado State single season record for made field goals, making 25 field goals throughout the 2021 season.

=== 2022 season ===
Camper left the Colorado State football program following a week two loss to Middle Tennessee State during the 2022 Colorado State football season.
