= Kitan Oladapo =

American football defensive back (born 2000)

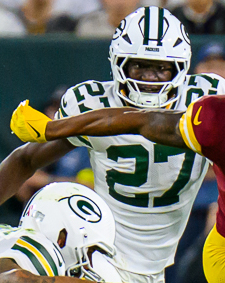
- Oladapo in 2025

No. 27 – Green Bay Packers
- Position: Safety
- Roster status: Active

Personal information
- Born: October 10, 2000 (age 26); West Covina, California, U.S.
- Listed height: 6 ft 2 in (1.88 m)
- Listed weight: 216 lb (98 kg)

Career information
- High school: Central Catholic
- College: Oregon State (2018–2023)
- NFL draft: 2024: 5th round, 169th overall pick

Career history
- Green Bay Packers (2024–present)

Awards and highlights
- Second-team All-Pac-12 (2023)

Career NFL statistics as of Week 10, 2026
- Total tackles: 23
- Pass deflections: 1
- Stats at Pro Football Reference

Olakitan "Kitan" Oladapo (born October 10, 2000) is an American professional football safety for the Green Bay Packers of the National Football League (NFL). He played college football for the Oregon State Beavers.

== Early life ==
Oladapo was raised in Happy Valley, Oregon and attended Central Catholic High School with fellow standouts Brady Breeze, Blake Brandel, and Cameron Scarlett. In his high school career he recorded 16 tackles, with one being for a loss. Oladapo was overlooked by college scouts, and decided to walk on to play college football at Oregon State.

== College career ==
In Oladapo's first season in 2018, he redshirted and did not appear in any games. In his second year in 2019, he would only play in one game, recording no stats. In the 2020 season Oladapo would take a big step up, playing in six games where he tallied 26 tackles, with 2.5 going for a loss, two sacks, a pass deflection, and a forced fumble. Oladapo intercepted a pass off of Cooper Legas in their loss to Utah State in the 2021 LA Bowl. Oladapo had a breakout 2021 season tallying 69 tackles, 5.5 being for a loss, a sack, an interception, and eight pass deflections. Oladapo opened the 2022 season strong; in Week two, he had a career-best 15 tackles, a sack, and a pass deflection. For his performance, Oladapo was named the Pac-12 Defensive Player of the Week. In the Beavers season finale, Oladapo recorded a new career-best 17 tackles along with a tackle for loss, as he helped Oregon State upset their rivals #9 Oregon. For his performance against the Ducks, Oladapo was named the Pac-12 Defensive Player of the Week for the second time that season. Oladapo finished the 2022 season with 80 tackles, four of them going for a loss, 2.5 sacks, and six pass deflections. For his performance on the year he was named an AP First Team All Pac-12. After the conclusion of the 2022 season, Oladapo announced that he would return to play for the Beavers in 2023. Oladapo was named to the First Team Preseason All Pac-12 team.

== Professional career ==
Pre-draft measurables
Height	Weight	Arm length	Hand span	Wingspan	40-yard dash	10-yard split	20-yard split	Vertical jump	Broad jump	Bench press
6 ft 2 in (1.88 m)	216 lb (98 kg)	32 3/8 in (0.82 m)	9 1/4 in (0.23 m)	6 ft 4 7/8 in (1.95 m)	4.58 s	1.59 s	2.66 s	36.0 in (0.91 m)	9 ft 9 in (2.97 m)	15 reps
All values from NFL Combine

Oladapo was selected in the fifth round (169th overall) of the 2024 NFL draft by the Green Bay Packers. On May 14, he signed his contract with the Packers.

== NFL career statistics ==
Legend
**Bold**	Career high

=== Regular season ===
Year	Team	Games		Tackles				Interceptions						Fumbles			
Year	Team	GP	GS	Cmb	Solo	Ast	Sck	PD	Int	Yds	Avg	Lng	TD	FF	FR	Yds	TD
2024	GB	9	0	7	2	**5**	0.0	0	0	0	0	0	0	0	0	0	0
2025	GB	**17**	0	**10**	**7**	3	0.0	**1**	0	0	0	0	0	0	0	0	0
Career		26	0	17	9	8	0.0	1	0	0	0	0	0	0	0	0	0
Source: pro-football-reference.com

=== Postseason ===
Year	Team	Games		Tackles				Interceptions						Fumbles			
Year	Team	GP	GS	Cmb	Solo	Ast	Sck	PD	Int	Yds	Avg	Lng	TD	FF	FR	Yds	TD
2024	GB	1	0	0	0	0	0.0	0	0	0	0.0	0	0	0	0	0	0
2025	GB	1	0	**2**	**2**	0	0.0	0	0	0	0.0	0	0	0	**1**	0	0
Career		2	0	2	2	0	0.0	0	0	0	0.0	0	0	0	1	0	0
Source: pro-football-reference.com

== Personal life ==
Oladapo is the son of Funke and Akin Oladapo and has two siblings, a brother, Kash (a goalkeeper for the Portland Hearts of Pine) and a sister, Anjola.

He is of Nigerian descent.
