= 2021 Air Force Falcons football team =

American college football season

2021 Air Force Falcons football

MW Mountain Division co-champion First Responder Bowl champion

First Responder Bowl, W 31–28 vs. Louisville
- Conference: Mountain West Conference
- Mountain Division
- Record: 10–3 (6–2 MW)
- Head coach: Troy Calhoun (15th season)
- Offensive coordinator: Mike Thiessen (13th season)
- Offensive scheme: Triple option
- Defensive coordinator: John Rudzinski (4th season)
- Base defense: Multiple
- Captains: Demonte Meeks; Jordan Jackson; Milton Bugg III; Corvan Taylor
- Home stadium: Falcon Stadium

Uniform
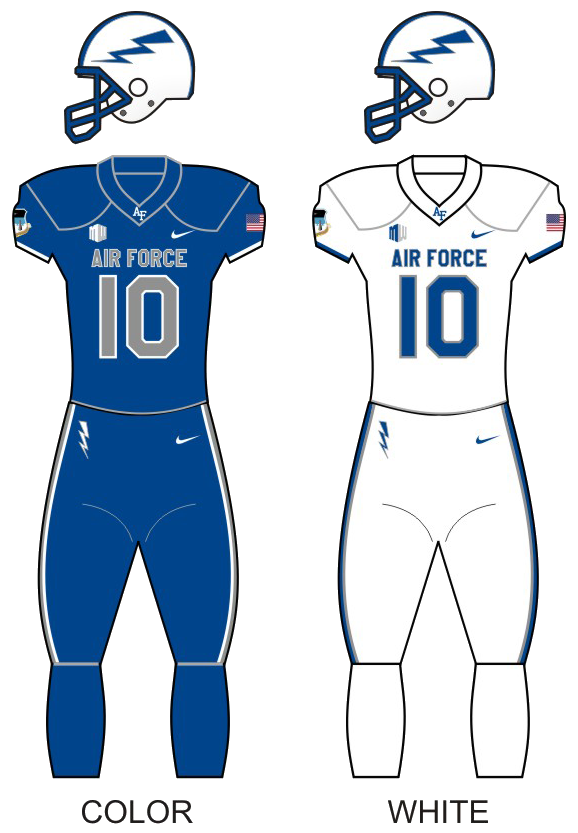

2021 Mountain West Conference football standings
	Conf.			Overall
Team	W		L	W		L
Mountain Division
No. 24 Utah State xy$	6	–	2	11	–	3
Air Force x	6	–	2	10	–	3
Boise State	5	–	3	7	–	5
Wyoming	2	–	6	7	–	6
Colorado State	2	–	6	3	–	9
New Mexico	1	–	7	3	–	9
West Division
No. 25 San Diego State xy	7	–	1	12	–	2
Fresno State	6	–	2	10	–	3
Nevada	5	–	3	8	–	5
Hawaii	3	–	5	6	–	7
San Jose State	3	–	5	5	–	7
UNLV	2	–	6	2	–	10
Championship: Utah State 46, San Diego State 13
$ – Conference champion; x – Division champion/co-champions; y – Championship game participant; Rankings from AP Poll

The 2021 Air Force Falcons football team represented the United States Air Force Academy as a member of the Mountain Division in the Mountain West Conference (MW) during the 2021 NCAA Division I FBS football season. Led by 15th-year head coach Troy Calhoun, the Falcons compiled an overall record of 10–3 with a mark of 6–2 in conference play, sharing the MW's Mountain Division title with Utah State. By virtue of a head-to-head loss to the Aggie, Air Force was left out of the Mountain West Championship Game. The Falcons were invited to the First Responder Bowl, where they defeated Louisville. The team played home games at Falcon Stadium in Colorado Springs, Colorado.

== Schedule ==
Date	Time	Opponent	Site	TV	Result	Attendance
September 4	12:00 p.m.	Lafayette*	Falcon Stadium; Colorado Springs, CO	Stadium	W 35–14	30,012
September 11	3:30 p.m.	at Navy*	Navy–Marine Corps Memorial Stadium; Annapolis, MD (Commander-in-Chief's Trophy)	CBS	W 23–3	36,997
September 18	5:30 p.m.	Utah State	Falcon Stadium; Colorado Springs, CO	FS2	L 45–49	20,264
September 25	6:00 p.m.	Florida Atlantic*	Falcon Stadium; Colorado Springs, CO	FS2	W 31–7	19,763
October 2	5:30 p.m.	at New Mexico	University Stadium; Albuquerque, NM	FS2	W 38–10	13,158
October 9	5:00 p.m.	Wyoming	Falcon Stadium; Colorado Springs, CO	CBSSN	W 24–14	24,832
October 16	7:00 p.m.	at Boise State	Albertsons Stadium; Boise, ID	FS1	W 24–17	34,446
October 23	5:00 p.m.	No. 22 San Diego State	Falcon Stadium; Colorado Springs, CO	CBSSN	L 14–20	23,887
November 6	9:30 a.m.	vs. Army*	Globe Life Field; Arlington, TX (Lockheed Martin Commanders Classic, Commander-in-Chief's Trophy)	CBS	L 14–21 ^{OT}	32,537
November 13	5:00 p.m.	at Colorado State	Canvas Stadium; Fort Collins, CO (rivalry)	CBSSN	W 35–21	25,550
November 19	7:00 p.m.	at Nevada	Mackay Stadium; Reno, NV	FS1	W 41–39 ^{3OT}	15,206
November 26	1:30 p.m.	UNLV	Falcon Stadium; Colorado Springs, CO	CBSSN	W 48–14	18,226
December 28	1:15 p.m.	vs. Louisville*	Gerald J. Ford Stadium; University Park, TX (First Responder Bowl)	ESPN	W 31–28	15,251
*Non-conference game; Rankings from AP Poll (and CFP Rankings, after November 2) - Released prior to game; All times are in Mountain time

== Rankings ==
Ranking movements Legend: ██ Increase in ranking ██ Decrease in ranking — = Not ranked RV = Received votes
	Week															
Poll	Pre	1	2	3	4	5	6	7	8	9	10	11	12	13	14	Final
AP	—	—	—	—	—	—	RV	RV	—	—	—	—	—	—	—	RV
Coaches	RV	RV	RV	—	—	—	RV	RV	RV	RV	—	—	RV	RV	RV	RV
CFP	Not released									—	—	—	—	—	—	Not released

== Preseason ==
=== Media poll ===
The preseason poll was released on July 21, 2021. The Falcons were predicted to finish in third place in the MW Mountain Division.

Mountain
Predicted finish	Team	Votes (1st place)
1	Boise State	148 (23)
2	Wyoming	115 (2)
3	Air Force	104
4	Colorado State	72
5	Utah State	47
6	New Mexico	39

West
Predicted finish	Team	Votes (1st place)
1	Nevada	141 (19)
2	San Jose State	121 (5)
3	San Diego State	96
4	Fresno State	85 (1)
5	Hawaii	56
6	UNLV	26

== Game summaries ==
=== Lafayette ===
Lafayette at Air Force

Team	1	2	3	4	Total
Leopards	0	7	7	0	14
• Falcons	14	14	0	7	35

- Date: September 4, 2021
- Location: Falcon Stadium
  Colorado Springs, CO
- Game start: 12:06 p.m. MDT
- Elapsed time: 3 hours and 12 minutes
- Game attendance: 30,012
- Game weather: Temperature: N/A • Weather: Sunny • Wind: N/A
- Referee: Christian Walker
- TV announcers (Stadium): Chris Hassel (play–by–play) and Sherdrick Bonner (analyst)

Scoring summary
1	08:01	AF	Micah Davis 10–yard run (Matthew Dapore kick) (10 plays, 59 yards, 4:53)	AF 7–0
1	00:25	AF	Haaziq Daniels 7–yard run (Matthew Dapore kick) (10 plays, 65 yards, 4:49)	AF 14–0
2	09:05	LAF	Julius Young 23–yard pass from Rent Montie (Micah Pettit kick) (13 plays, 83 yards, 6:16)	AF 14–7
2	03:09	AF	Micah Davis 16–yard run (Matthew Dapore kick failed) (12 plays, 75 yards, 5:56)	AF 20–7
2	00:18	AF	Haaziq Daniels 2–yard run (DeAndre Hughes rush) (7 plays, 40 yards, 1:20)	AF 28–7
3	07:50	LAF	Selwyn Simpson 3–yard run (Micah Pettit kick) (10 plays, 68 yards, 5:11)	AF 28–14
4	06:10	AF	Haaziq Daniels 19–yard run (Matthew Dapore kick) (8 plays, 68 yards, 4:02)	AF 35–14

Statistics	Lafayette	Air Force
First downs	12	24
Total yards	287	420
Rushing yards	43	370
Passing yards	244	50
Turnovers	2	0
Time of possession	25:39	34:21

Team	Category	Player	Statistics
Lafayette	Passing	Aaron Angelos	10/16, 158 yards
Lafayette	Rushing	Jaden Sutton	7 carries, 38 yards
Lafayette	Receiving	Julius Young	8 receptions, 147 yards, 1 TD
Air Force	Passing	Haaziq Daniels	3/5, 50 yards
Air Force	Rushing	Brad Roberts	25 carries, 111 yards
Air Force	Receiving	Micah Davis	2 receptions, 27 yards

=== At Navy ===
Air Force at Navy
(Commander-in-Chief's Trophy)

Team	1	2	3	4	Total
• Falcons	0	7	7	9	23
Midshipmen	0	3	0	0	3

- Date: September 11, 2021
- Location: Navy–Marine Corps Memorial Stadium
  Annapolis, MD
- Game start: 3:44 p.m. EDT
- Elapsed time: 3 hours and 8 minutes
- Game attendance: 36,997
- Game weather: Temperature: 78 °F (26 °C) • Weather: Partly Cloudy • Wind: S 6 MPH
- Referee: David Alvarez
- TV announcers (CBS): Brad Nessler (play–by–play), Gary Danielson (analyst) and Jamie Erdahl (sideline)

Scoring summary
2	10:36	NAVY	Bijan Nichols 23–yard field goal (7 plays, 32 yards, 3:32)	NAVY 3–0
2	01:09	AF	Brad Roberts 3–yard run (Matthew Dapore kick) (9 plays, 43 yards, 3:26)	AF 7–3
3	00:32	AF	Haaziq Daniels 28–yard run (Matthew Dapore kick) (9 plays, 54 yards, 4:09)	AF 14–3
4	13:33	AF	Team 23–yard safety	AF 16–3
4	09:13	AF	Brad Roberts 2–yard run (Matthew Dapore kick) (7 plays, 58 yards, 4:20)	AF 23–3

Statistics	Air Force	Navy
First downs	14	6
Total yards	225	68
Rushing yards	176	36
Passing yards	49	32
Turnovers	1	3
Time of possession	36:48	23:12

Team	Category	Player	Statistics
Air Force	Passing	Haaziq Daniels	3/10, 49 yards
Air Force	Rushing	Brad Roberts	29 carries, 97 yards, 2 TDs
Air Force	Receiving	Micah Davis	1 reception, 27 yards
Navy	Passing	Maasai Maynor	3/5, 32 yards
Navy	Rushing	Xavier Arline	16 carries, 31 yards
Navy	Receiving	Mychal Cooper	1 reception, 15 yards

=== Utah State ===
Utah State at Air Force

Team	1	2	3	4	Total
• Aggies	7	6	21	15	49
Falcons	10	14	14	7	45

- Date: September 18, 2021
- Location: Falcon Stadium
  Colorado Springs, CO
- Game start: 5:35 p.m. MDT
- Elapsed time: 3 hours and 35 minutes
- Game attendance: 20,264
- Game weather: Temperature: N/A • Weather: Sunny • Wind: N/A
- Referee: Cal McNeill
- TV announcers (FS2): Cory Provus (play–by–play) and Devin Gardner (analyst)

Scoring summary
1	11:46	AF	Micah Davis 5–yard run (Matthew Dapore kick) (6 plays, 75 yards, 3:14)	AF 7–0
1	05:34	AF	Matthew Dapore 15–yard field goal (9 plays, 75 yards, 4:11)	AF 10–0
1	01:17	USU	Calvin Tyler Jr. 1–yard run (Connor Coles kick) (13 plays, 71 yards, 4:12)	AF 10–7
2	10:16	USU	Brandon Bowling 6–yard pass from Logan Bonner (Connor Coles kick blocked) (11 plays, 92 yards, 3:45)	USU 13–10
2	08:19	AF	Micah Davis 56–yard pass from Haaziq Daniels (Matthew Dapore kick) (5 plays, 71 yards, 1:55)	AF 17–13
2	00:56	AF	Dane Kinamon 3–yard run (Matthew Dapore kick) (16 plays, 75 yards, 6:52)	AF 24–13
3	13:26	USU	Justin McGriff 24–yard pass from Logan Bonner (Connor Coles kick) (7 plays, 69 yards, 1:28)	AF 24–20
3	11:17	AF	Emmanuel Michel 51–yard run (Matthew Dapore kick) (5 plays, 75 yards, 2:09)	AF 31–20
3	07:48	USU	Carson Terrell 5–yard pass from Andrew Peasley (Connor Coles kick) (10 plays, 75 yards, 3:29)	AF 31–27
3	03:18	USU	Brandon Bowling 37–yard pass from Andrew Peasley (Connor Coles kick) (6 plays, 56 yards, 1:39)	USU 34–31
3	00:52	AF	Emmanuel Michel 55–yard run (Matthew Dapore kick) (5 plays, 75 yards, 2:26)	AF 38–34
4	10:37	AF	Haaziq Daniels 39–yard run (Matthew Dapore kick) (4 plays, 50 yards, 1:49)	AF 45–34
4	09:51	USU	Deven Thompkins 72–yard pass from Andrew Peasley (rush) (3 plays, 75 yards, 0:38)	AF 45–42
4	03:54	USU	Calvin Tyler Jr. 61–yard run (Connor Coles kick) (6 plays, 85 yards, 2:02)	USU 49–45

Statistics	Utah State	Air Force
First downs	26	23
Total yards	628	619
Rushing yards	180	437
Passing yards	448	182
Turnovers	0	2
Time of possession	26:01	33:59

Team	Category	Player	Statistics
Utah State	Passing	Logan Bonner	21/34, 253 yards, 2 TDs, 1 INT
Utah State	Rushing	Calvin Tyler Jr.	19 carries, 132 yards, 2 TDs
Utah State	Receiving	Deven Thompkins	9 receptions, 188 yards, 1 TD
Air Force	Passing	Haaziq Daniels	6/12, 182 yards, 1 TD, 1 INT
Air Force	Rushing	Emmanuel Michel	11 carries, 133 yards, 2 TDs
Air Force	Receiving	Micah Davis	4 receptions, 110 yards, 1 TD

=== Florida Atlantic ===
Florida Atlantic at Air Force

Team	1	2	3	4	Total
Owls	0	7	0	0	7
• Falcons	14	10	7	0	31

- Date: September 25, 2021
- Location: Falcon Stadium
  Colorado Springs, CO
- Game start: 6:05 p.m. MDT
- Elapsed time: 3 hours and 45 minutes
- Game attendance: 19,763
- Referee: Rodney Burnette
- TV announcers (FS2): Cory Provus (play–by–play) and Devin Gardner (analyst)

Scoring summary
1	8:47	AF	Haaziq Daniels 4–yard run (Anthony Rodriguez kick) (8 plays, 68 yards, 4:20)	AF 7–0
1	5:35	AF	Haaziq Daniels 94–yard run (Anthony Rodriguez kick) (1 play, 94 yards, 0:13)	AF 14–0
2	11:48	AF	Brad Roberts 3–yard run (Anthony Rodriguez kick) (14 plays, 82 yards, 7:26)	AF 21–0
2	5:10	AF	Anthony Rodriguez 23–yard field goal (9 plays, 50 yards, 5:00)	AF 24–0
2	3:42	FAU	N'Kosi Perry 34–yard run (Aaron Shahriari kick) (4 plays, 74 yards, 1:23)	AF 24–7
3	3:30	AF	Micah Davis 6–yard run (Anthony Rodriguez kick) (12 plays, 97 yards, 6:39)	AF 31–7

Statistics	Florida Atlantic	Air Force
First downs	10	24
Total yards	219	516
Rushing yards	141	446
Passing yards	78	70
Turnovers	1	0
Time of possession	19:03	40:57

Team	Category	Player	Statistics
Florida Atlantic	Passing	N'Kosi Perry	11/33, 78 yds, 1 INT
Florida Atlantic	Rushing	Johnny Ford	8 car, 66 yds
Florida Atlantic	Receiving	Jequan Burton	2 rec, 28 yds
Air Force	Passing	Haaziq Daniels	2/4, 70 yds
Air Force	Rushing	Haaziq Daniels	17 car, 164 yds, 2 TD
Air Force	Receiving	Brandon Lewis	1 rec, 46 yds

=== At New Mexico ===
Air Force at New Mexico

Team	1	2	3	4	Total
• Falcons	7	17	7	7	38
Lobos	0	0	7	3	10

- Date: October 2, 2021
- Location: University Stadium
  Albuquerque, NM
- Game start: 5:30 p.m. MDT
- Game attendance: 13,158
- TV announcers (FS2): Dan Hellie (play-by-play) and Robert Smith (analyst)

Statistics	Air Force	New Mexico
First downs	24	14
Total yards	441	226
Rushing yards	408	47
Passing yards	33	179
Turnovers	0	3
Time of possession	41:53	18:07

Team	Category	Player	Statistics
Air Force	Passing	Haaziq Daniels	1/2, 33 yards
Air Force	Rushing	Brad Roberts	28 carries, 142 yards, 2 TD
Air Force	Receiving	Brandon Lewis	1 Reception, 33 yards
New Mexico	Passing	Terry Wilson	14/23, 179 yards, 1 TD, 1 INT
New Mexico	Rushing	Aaron Dumas	3 carries, 15 yards
New Mexico	Receiving	Luke Wysong	3 receptions, 70 yards

=== Wyoming ===
Wyoming at Air Force

Team	1	2	3	4	Total
Cowboys	0	14	0	0	14
• Falcons	7	7	7	3	24

- Date: October 9, 2021
- Location: Falcon Stadium
  Colorado Springs, CO
- Game start: 5:00 p.m. MDT
- Game attendance: 24,832
- Television network: CBSSN

Scoring summary
1	6:42	AF	Brad Roberts 1–yard run (Anthony Rodriguez kick) (15 plays, 75 yards, 8:18)	AF 7–0
2	10:43	AF	Dane Kinamon 2–yard run (Anthony Rodriguez kick) (11 plays, 38 yards, 6:08)	AF 14–0
2	2:39	WYO	Sean Chambers 1–yard run (John Hoyland kick) (6 plays, 97 yards, 1:59)	AF 14–7
2	0:15	WYO	Isaiah Neyor 10–yard reception from Sean Chambers (John Hoyland kick) (5 plays, 73 yards, 0:52)	TIED 14–14
3	5:46	AF	Micah Davis 13–yard reception from Haaziq Daniels (Anthony Rodriguez kick) (8 plays, 85 yards, 4:09)	AF 21–14
4	7:18	AF	Anthony Rodriguez 26–yard field goal (15 plays, 67 yards, 7:11)	AF 24–14

Statistics	Wyoming	Air Force
First downs	15	20
Total yards	257	321
Rushing yards	114	211
Passing yards	143	110
Turnovers	2	1
Time of possession	21:12	38:48

Team	Category	Player	Statistics
Wyoming	Passing	Sean Chambers	11/28, 143 yards, TD
Wyoming	Rushing	Xazavian Valladay	8 carries, 96 yards
Wyoming	Receiving	Isaiah Neyor	3 receptions, 55 yards, TD
Air Force	Passing	Haaziq Daniels	7/10, 110 yards, TD
Air Force	Rushing	Brad Roberts	33 carries, 140 yards, TD
Air Force	Receiving	Brandon Lewis	5 receptions, 77 yards

=== At Boise State ===
Air Force at Boise State

Team	1	2	3	4	Total
• Falcons	7	14	0	3	24
Broncos	7	7	0	3	17

- Date: October 16, 2021
- Location: Albertsons Stadium
  Boise, ID
- Game start: 7:00 p.m. (Kicked at 7:10 p.m.) MDT
- Elapsed time: 3 hours and 23 minutes
- Game attendance: 34,446
- Game weather: Temperature: 67 °F (19 °C) • Weather: Sunny • Wind: SE 15 MPH
- Referee: Kevin Hassell
- TV announcers (Fox/FS1/FS2): Cory Provus (play-by-play) and Mark Helfrich (analyst)

Scoring summary
1	11:15	BSU	Stefan Cobbs 8–yard pass from Hank Bachmeier (Jonah Dalmas kick) (11 plays, 75 yards, 3:45)	BSU 7–0
1	4:29	AF	Brad Roberts 4–yard run (Anthony Rodriguez kick) (14 plays, 75 yards, 6:46)	TIED 7–7
2	13:53	AF	Haaziq Daniels 25–yard run (Anthony Rodriguez kick) (10 plays, 76 yards, 4:19)	AF 14–7
2	10:04	BSU	Andrew Van Buren 11–yard run (Jonah Dalmas kick) (10 plays, 80 yards, 3:41)	TIED 14–14
2	6:12	AF	Brad Roberts 1–yard run (Anthony Rodriguez kick) (8 plays, 75 yards, 3:52)	AF 21–14
4	2:49	AF	Matthew Dapore 28–yard field goal (4 plays, 6 yards, 2:06)	AF 24–14
4	0:49	BSU	Jonah Dalmas 37–yard field goal (11 plays, 53 yards, 1:56)	AF 24–17

Statistics	Air Force	Boise State
First downs	19	18
Total yards	366	337
Rushing yards	307	78
Passing yards	59	259
Turnovers	1	2
Time of possession	37:01	22:59

Team	Category	Player	Statistics
Air Force	Passing	Haaziq Daniels	1/5, 59 yards
Air Force	Rushing	Brad Roberts	28 carries, 138 yards, 2 TD
Air Force	Receiving	Brandon Lewis	1 reception, 59 yards
Boise State	Passing	Hank Bachmeier	23/36, 259 yards, TD, INT
Boise State	Rushing	Andrew Van Buren	15 carries, 58 yards, TD
Boise State	Receiving	Stefan Cobbs	6 receptions, 83 yards, TD

=== No. 22 San Diego State ===
San Diego State at Air Force

Team	1	2	3	4	Total
• No. 22 Aztecs	3	10	7	0	20
Falcons	0	0	7	7	14

- Date: October 23, 2021
- Location: Falcon Stadium
  Colorado Springs, CO
- Game start: 5:07 p.m. MDT
- Elapsed time: 3 hours and 6 minutes
- Game attendance: 23,887
- Game weather: Sunny
- Referee: Derek Anderson
- TV announcers (CBSSN): Rich Waltz (play-by-play), Aaron Taylor (analysis), Jenny Dell (sidelines), and Scott Brandwein (producer)

Scoring summary
1	12:26	SDSU	Matt Araiza 22-yard field goal (4 plays, 4 yards, 1:42)	SDSU 3–0
2	8:42	SDSU	Kaegun Williams 1–yard run (Matt Araiza kick) (12 plays, 42 yards, 5:45)	SDSU 10–0
2	1:54	SDSU	Matt Araiza 51–yard field goal (7 plays, 12 yards, 4:27)	SDSU 13–0
3	11:05	SDSU	Chance Bell 3–yard run (Matt Araiza kick) (7 plays, 75 yards, 3:48)	SDSU 20–0
3	1:07	AF	Dalton King 13–yard pass from Warren Bryan (Matthew Dapore kick) (11 plays, 57 yards, 4:57)	SDSU 20–7
4	3:59	AF	Dane Kinamon 3-yard run (Matthew Dapore kick) (15 plays, 89 yards, 6:33)	SDSU 20–14

Statistics	San Diego State	Air Force
First downs	10	15
Total yards	229	259
Rushing yards	157	192
Passing yards	72	67
Turnovers	0	1
Time of possession	31:15	28:45

Team	Category	Player	Statistics
San Diego State	Passing	Lucas Johnson	11/13, 72 yards
San Diego State	Rushing	Chance Bell	8 carries, 50 yards, TD
San Diego State	Receiving	Elijah Kothe	3 receptions, 25 yards
Air Force	Passing	Warren Bryan	3/7, 58 yards, TD
Air Force	Rushing	Haaziq Daniels	9 carries, 50 yards
Air Force	Receiving	Jake Spiewak	1 reception, 31 yards

=== Vs. Army ===
Air Force vs. Army
(Commander-in-Chief's Trophy)

Team	1	2	3	4	Total
Black Knights	0	0	14	0	14
Falcons	0	0	3	11	14

- Date: November 6, 2021
- Location: Globe Life Field
  Arlington, TX
- Game start: 10:30 a.m. CDT
- Game attendance: 32,537
- Game weather: Temperature: 72 °F (22 °C) • Weather: Indoor • Wind: None
- Referee: Brandon Cruse
- TV announcers (CBS): Rich Waltz (play-by-play), Aaron Taylor (analyst) & Sherree Burruss (sideline)

Scoring summary
3	11:06	ARMY	Tyhier Tyler 9-yard rush (Cole Talley) (7 plays, 64 yards, 3:48)	ARMY 7–0
3	6:07	AF	Matthew Dapore 39-yard field goal (9 plays, 49 yards, 4:54)	ARMY 7–3
3	5:07	ARMY	Tyrell Robinson 79-yard pass from Christian Anderson (Cole Talley kick) (2 plays, 79 yards, 0:55)	ARMY 14–3
4	10:23	AF	Dane Kinamon 4–yard pass from Haaziq Daniels (DeAndre Hughes rush) (7 plays, 66 yards, 3:09)	ARMY 14–11
4	0:23	AF	Matthew Dapore 30-yard field goal (15 plays, 78 yards, 4:40)	TIED 14–14
OT		ARMY	Jordyn Law 0-yard rush (Cole Talley kick) (6 plays, 19 yards, 0:00)	ARMY 21–14

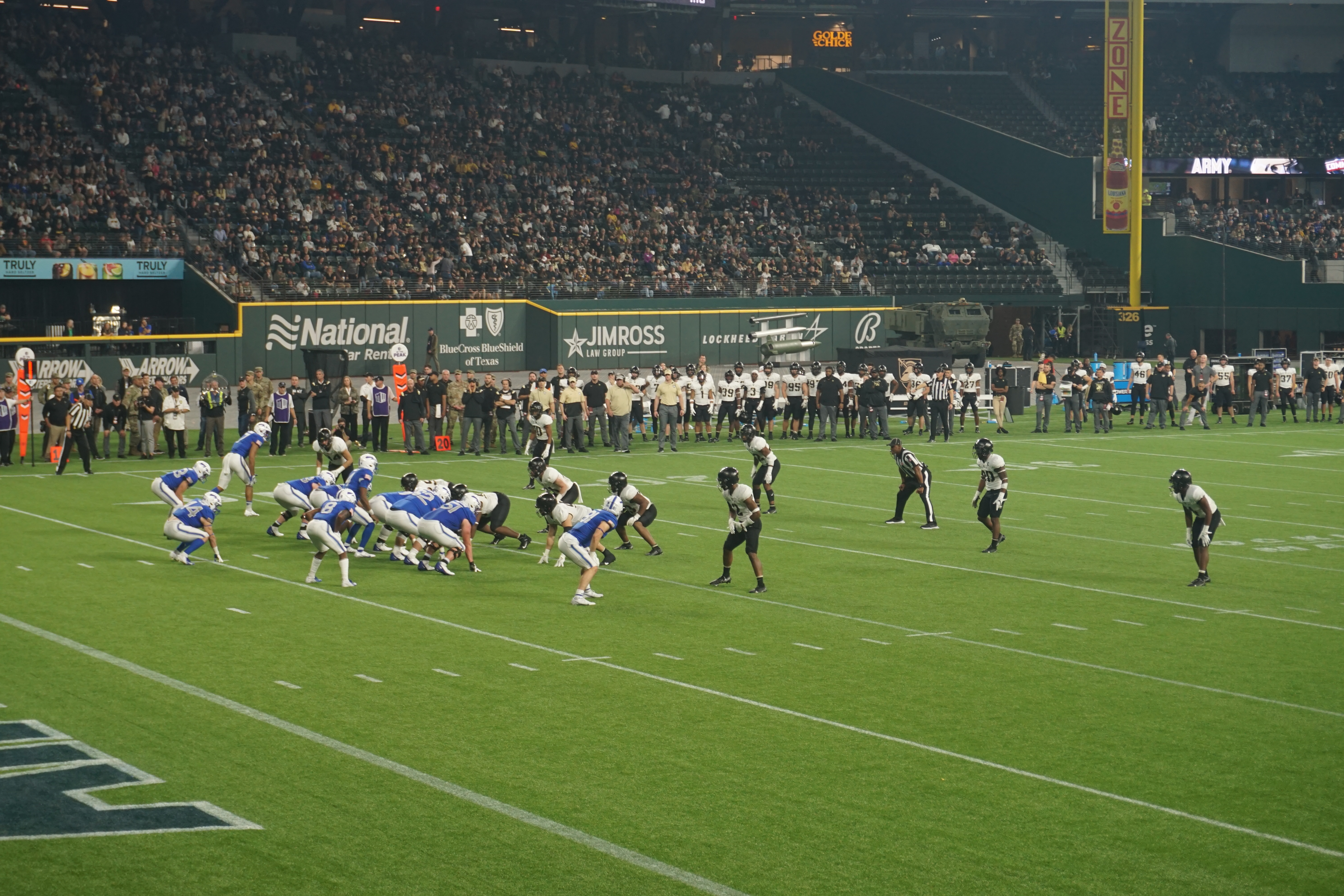
Air Force on offense against Army

Statistics	Army	Air Force
First downs	13	22
Total yards	322	401
Rushing yards	108	175
Passing yards	214	226
Turnovers	0	1
Time of possession	29:03	30:57

Team	Category	Player	Statistics
Army	Passing	Christian Anderson	7/12, 175 yards, TD
Army	Rushing	Tyhier Tyler	15 carries, 39 yards, TD
Army	Receiving	Tyrell Robinson	2 receptions, 118 yards, TD
Air Force	Passing	Haaziq Daniels	13/22, 226 carries, TD
Air Force	Rushing	Brad Roberts	18 carries, 68 yards
Air Force	Receiving	Brandon Lewis	5 receptions, 106 yards

=== At Colorado State ===
Air Force at Colorado State
(Rivalry)

Team	1	2	3	4	Total
• Falcons	21	0	14	0	35
Rams	7	7	7	0	21

- Date: November 13, 2021
- Location: Canvas Stadium
  Fort Collins, CO
- Game start: 5:00 p.m. MST
- Game attendance: 25,550
- Television network: CBSSN

Statistics	Air Force	Colorado State
First downs	26	17
Total yards	509	308
Rushing yards	388	135
Passing yards	121	173
Turnovers	1	2
Time of possession	38:36	21:24

Team	Category	Player	Statistics
Air Force	Passing	Haaziq Daniels	4/11, 121 yards, 2 TD, INT
Air Force	Rushing	Brad Roberts	32 carries, 151 yards, 2 TD
Air Force	Receiving	Brandon Lewis	1 receptions, 92 yards, TD
Colorado State	Passing	Todd Centeio	13/22, 173 yards, 2 INT
Colorado State	Rushing	Todd Centeio	12 carries, 55 yards, TD
Colorado State	Receiving	Trey McBride	4 receptions, 81 yards

=== At Nevada ===
Air Force at Nevada

Team	1	2	3	4	Total
Falcons	0	17	7	0	24
Wolf Pack	3	0	7	14	24

- Date: November 19, 2021
- Location: Mackay Stadium
  Reno, NV
- Television network: FS1

Statistics	Air Force	Nevada
First downs		
Total yards		
Rushing yards		
Passing yards		
Turnovers		
Time of possession		

Team	Category	Player	Statistics
Air Force	Passing		
Air Force	Rushing		
Air Force	Receiving		
Nevada	Passing		
Nevada	Rushing		
Nevada	Receiving		

=== UNLV ===
UNLV at Air Force

Team	1	2	3	4	Total
Rebels	0	0	7	7	14
• Falcons	14	10	17	7	48

- Date: November 26, 2021
- Location: Falcon Stadium
  Colorado Springs, CO
- Game start: 1:30 p.m. MST
- Television network: CBSSN

Statistics	UNLV	Air Force
First downs		
Total yards		
Rushing yards		
Passing yards		
Turnovers		
Time of possession		

Team	Category	Player	Statistics
UNLV	Passing		
UNLV	Rushing		
UNLV	Receiving		
Air Force	Passing		
Air Force	Rushing		
Air Force	Receiving		

== Roster ==
2021 Air Force Falcons football team roster
Players
Coaches
Offense

Pos.	#	Name	Class

Defense

Pos.	#	Name	Class
FS	7	Trey Taylor	So
ILB	31	Bo Richter	So

Special teams

Pos.	#	Name	Class

Head coach

Coordinators/assistant coaches

- Curome Cox – Defensive backs

Legend

- (C) Team captain
- (S) Suspended
- (I) Ineligible
- Injured
- Redshirt

Roster
Last update: September 17, 2021
