= 2021 New Mexico Lobos football team =

American college football season

2021 New Mexico Lobos football
- Conference: Mountain West Conference
- Mountain Division
- Record: 3–9 (1–7 MW)
- Head coach: Danny Gonzales (2nd season)
- Offensive coordinator: Derek Warehime (2nd season)
- Offensive scheme: No-huddle spread option
- Defensive coordinator: Rocky Long (2nd season)
- Base defense: 3–3–5
- Home stadium: University Stadium

Uniform
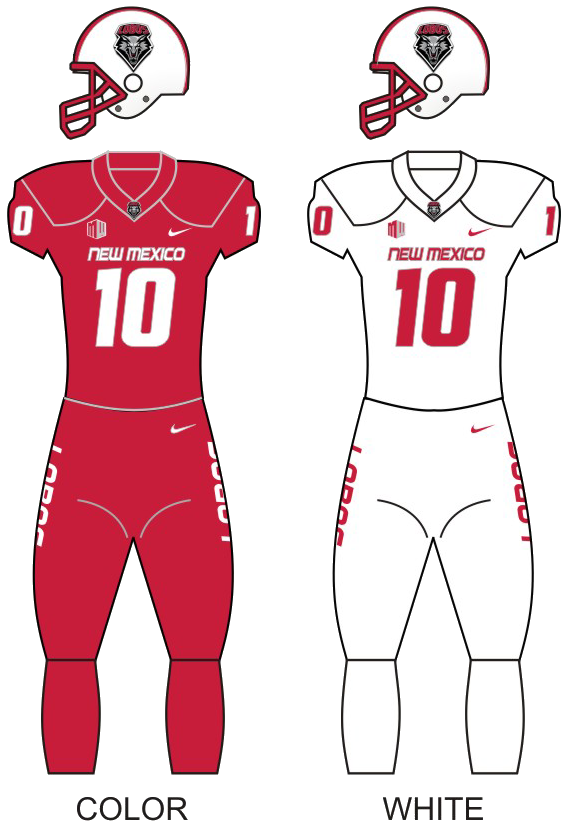

2021 Mountain West Conference football standings
	Conf.			Overall
Team	W		L	W		L
Mountain Division
No. 24 Utah State xy$	6	–	2	11	–	3
Air Force x	6	–	2	10	–	3
Boise State	5	–	3	7	–	5
Wyoming	2	–	6	7	–	6
Colorado State	2	–	6	3	–	9
New Mexico	1	–	7	3	–	9
West Division
No. 25 San Diego State xy	7	–	1	12	–	2
Fresno State	6	–	2	10	–	3
Nevada	5	–	3	8	–	5
Hawaii	3	–	5	6	–	7
San Jose State	3	–	5	5	–	7
UNLV	2	–	6	2	–	10
Championship: Utah State 46, San Diego State 13
$ – Conference champion; x – Division champion/co-champions; y – Championship game participant; Rankings from AP Poll

The 2021 New Mexico Lobos football team represented the University of New Mexico as a member of the Mountain Division in the Mountain West Conference (MW) during the 2021 NCAA Division I FBS football season. Led by second-year head coach Danny Gonzales, the Lobos compiled an overall record of 3–9 with a mark of 1–7 in conference play, placing last out of six teams in the MW's Mountain Division. The team played home games at University Stadium in Albuquerque, New Mexico.

== Schedule ==
Date	Time	Opponent	Site	TV	Result	Attendance
September 2	6:00 p.m.	Houston Baptist*	University Stadium; Albuquerque, NM	KASY-TV, ESPN+	W 27–17	15,908
September 11	5:00 p.m.	New Mexico State*	University Stadium; Albuquerque, NM (Rio Grande Rivalry)	Stadium	W 34–25	28,470
September 18	10:00 a.m.	at No. 7 Texas A&M*	Kyle Field; College Station, TX	SECN	L 0–34	84,748
September 25	7:00 p.m.	at UTEP*	Sun Bowl; El Paso, TX	ESPN+	L 13–20	15,069
October 2	5:30 p.m.	Air Force	University Stadium; Albuquerque, NM	FS2	L 10–38	13,158
October 9	7:00 p.m.	at No. 25 San Diego State	Dignity Health Sports Park; Carson, CA	FS1	L 7–31	8,387
October 16	5:00 p.m.	Colorado State	University Stadium; Albuquerque, NM	Stadium	L 7–36	15,403
October 23	1:30 p.m.	at Wyoming	War Memorial Stadium; Laramie, WY	Stadium	W 14–3	20,133
November 6	5:00 p.m.	UNLV^{†}	University Stadium; Albuquerque, NM	Stadium	L 17–31	14,007
November 13	5:00 p.m.	at Fresno State	Bulldog Stadium; Fresno, CA	Stadium	L 7–34	35,020
November 20	7:00 p.m.	at Boise State	Albertsons Stadium; Boise, ID	FS1	L 0–37	28,535
November 26	11:00 a.m.	Utah State	University Stadium; Albuquerque, NM	FS1	L 10–35	11,046
*Non-conference game; ^{†}Homecoming; Rankings from AP Poll (and CFP Rankings, after November 2) - Released prior to game; All times are in Mountain time

== Preseason ==
=== Award watch lists ===
Listed in the order they were released

Award	Player	Position	Year
Jim Thorpe Award	Jerrick Reed II	S	SR
Johnny Unitas Golden Arm Award	Terry Wilson Jr.	QB	SR

=== Mountain West media days ===
The Mountain West media days were held on July 21–22, 2021, at the Cosmopolitan in Paradise, Nevada.

==== Media poll ====
The preseason poll was released on July 21, 2021. The Lobos were predicted to finish in sixth place in the MW Mountain Division.

==== Preseason All-Mountain West Team ====
The Lobos had one player selected to the preseason All–Mountain West Team; one from the defense.

Defense

Jerrick Reed II – S

== Game summaries ==
=== Houston Baptist ===
Houston Baptist at New Mexico

Team	1	2	3	4	Total
Huskies	0	10	0	7	17
• Lobos	14	7	3	3	27

- Date: September 2, 2021
- Location: University Stadium
  Albuquerque, NM
- Game start: 6:05 p.m. MDT
- Elapsed time: 3 hours and 3 minutes
- Game attendance: 15,908
- Game weather: Temperature: N/A • Weather: Sunny • Wind: N/A
- Referee: Cal McNeill
- TV announcers (KASY-TV/ESPN+): Jeff Siembieda (play–by–play) and George Carter (analyst)

Scoring summary
1	12:50	NM	Kyle Jarvis 11–yard pass from Terry Wilson Jr. (Andrew Shelley kick) (3 plays, 22 yards, 1:28)	NM 7–0
1	08:16	NM	Trace Bruckler 4–yard pass from Terry Wilson Jr. (Andrew Shelley kick) (9 plays, 74 yards, 4:02)	NM 14–0
2	12:59	HBU	Tyson Thompson 44–yard punt return (Gino Garcia kick)	NM 14–7
2	04:27	HBU	Gino Garcia 45–yard field goal (16 plays, 48 yards, 6:09)	NM 14–10
2	02:40	NM	Keyonte Lanier 47–yard pass from Terry Wilson Jr. (Andrew Shelley kick) (4 plays, 59 yards, 1:40)	NM 21–10
3	06:22	NM	Andrew Shelley 30–yard field goal (10 plays, 38 yards, 5:42)	NM 24–10
4	04:03	HBU	Charles King 6–yard pass from Blaise Bentsen (Gino Garcia kick) (7 plays, 40 yards, 2:57)	NM 24–17
4	01:38	NM	Andrew Shelley 37–yard field goal (4 plays, 7 yards, 1:21)	NM 27–17

Statistics	Houston Baptist	New Mexico
First downs	15	16
Total yards	187	308
Rushing yards	–9	129
Passing yards	196	179
Turnovers	3	3
Time of possession	26:47	33:13

Team	Category	Player	Statistics
Houston Baptist	Passing	Blaise Bentsen	27/47, 196 yards, 1 TD, 2 INTs
Houston Baptist	Rushing	Dreshawn Minnieweather	5 carries, 21 yards
Houston Baptist	Receiving	Charles King	7 receptions, 64 yards, 1 TD
New Mexico	Passing	Terry Wilson Jr.	20/26, 174 yards, 3 TDs
New Mexico	Rushing	Aaron Dumas	15 carries, 57 yards
New Mexico	Receiving	Keyonte Lanier	3 receptions, 72 yards, 1 TD

=== New Mexico State ===
New Mexico State at New Mexico
(Battle of I-25 / Rio Grande Rivalry)

Team	1	2	3	4	Total
Aggies	3	17	2	3	25
• Lobos	14	10	3	7	34

- Date: September 11, 2021
- Location: University Stadium
  Albuquerque, NM
- Game start: 5:06 p.m. MDT
- Elapsed time: 3 hours and 35 minutes
- Game attendance: 28,470
- Game weather: Temperature: 93 °F (34 °C) • Weather: Sunny • Wind: N/A
- Referee: Dan Scanlan
- TV announcers (Stadium): Ari Wolfe (play–by–play) and Mike Lamb (analyst)

Scoring summary
1	14:00	NM	Bobby Cole 4–yard run (Andrew Shelley kick) (3 plays, 64 yards, 0:50)	NM 7–0
1	07:42	NMSU	Ethan Albertson 43–yard field goal (8 plays, 34 yards, 2:27)	NM 7–3
1	05:37	NM	Connor Witthoft 15–yard pass from Terry Wilson Jr. (Andrew Shelley kick) (7 plays, 75 yards, 2:05)	NM 14–3
2	14:20	NMSU	Ethan Albertson 33–yard field goal (7 plays, 54 yards, 1:29)	NM 14–6
2	06:33	NMSU	Thomaz Whitford 11–yard pass from Isaiah Garcia–Castaneda (Ethan Albertson kick) (8 plays, 68 yards, 2:45)	NM 14–13
2	02:07	NM	Andrew Erickson 17–yard pass from Terry Wilson Jr. (Andrew Shelley kick) (5 plays, 48 yards, 1:57)	NM 21–13
2	01:57	NMSU	Isaiah Garcia–Castaneda 75–yard pass from Dino Maldonado (Ethan Albertson kick) (1 play, 75 yards, 0:10)	NM 21–20
2	00:53	NM	Andrew Shelley 45–yard field goal (5 plays, 21 yards, 0:57)	NM 24–20
3	12:10	NMSU	Team 0–yard safety	NM 24–22
3	00:36	NM	Andrew Shelley 24–yard field goal (4 plays, 1 yard, 0:52)	NM 27–22
4	12:32	NMSU	Ethan Albertson 37–yard field goal (10 plays, 56 yards, 3:04)	NM 27–25
4	12:01	NM	Emmanuel Logan–Greene 58–yard pass from Terry Wilson Jr. (Andrew Shelley kick) (2 plays, 75 yards, 0:31)	NM 34–25

Statistics	New Mexico State	New Mexico
First downs	19	29
Total yards	345	559
Rushing yards	109	178
Passing yards	236	381
Turnovers	0	3
Time of possession	23:32	36:28

Team	Category	Player	Statistics
New Mexico State	Passing	Dino Maldonado	13/34, 192 yards, 1 TD, 2 INTs
New Mexico State	Rushing	Dino Maldonado	6 carries, 46 yards
New Mexico State	Receiving	Isaiah Garcia–Castaneda	3 receptions, 98 yards, 1 TD
New Mexico	Passing	Terry Wilson Jr.	26/37, 381 yards, 3 TDs
New Mexico	Rushing	Bobby Cole	20 carries, 107 yards, 1 TD
New Mexico	Receiving	Emmanuel Logan–Greene	7 receptions, 106 yards, 1 TD

=== At No. 7 Texas A&M ===
New Mexico at Texas A&M

Team	1	2	3	4	Total
Lobos	0	0	0	0	0
• No. 7 Aggies	14	10	10	0	34

- Date: September 18, 2021
- Location: Kyle Field
  College Station, TX
- Game start: 11:03 a.m. CDT
- Elapsed time: 2 hours and 57 minutes
- Game attendance: 84,748
- Game weather: Temperature: 85 °F (29 °C) • Weather: Sunny • Wind: N/A
- Referee: Wayne Winkler
- TV announcers (SECN): Taylor Zarzour (play–by–play), Matt Stinchcomb (analyst) and Alyssa Lang (sideline)

Scoring summary
1	11:44	TAMU	De’Von Achane 26–yard pass from Zach Calzada (Seth Small kick) (3 plays, 43 yards, 1:10)	TAMU 7–0
1	09:28	TAMU	Demond Demas 70–yard pass from Zach Calzada (Seth Small kick) (1 play, 70 yards, 0:10)	TAMU 14–0
2	06:14	TAMU	Isaiah Spiller 5–yard run (Seth Small kick) (12 plays, 60 yards, 5:51)	TAMU 21–0
2	01:05	TAMU	Seth Small 35–yard field goal (7 plays, 44 yards, 3:04)	TAMU 24–0
3	13:07	TAMU	Seth Small 44–yard field goal (5 plays, 36 yards, 1:45)	TAMU 27–0
3	02:20	TAMU	Moose Muhammad III 7–yard pass from Zach Calzada (Seth Small kick) (8 plays, 90 yards, 4:12)	TAMU 34–0

Statistics	New Mexico	Texas A&M
First downs	9	22
Total yards	122	429
Rushing yards	89	154
Passing yards	33	275
Turnovers	0	0
Time of possession	29:01	30:59

Team	Category	Player	Statistics
New Mexico	Passing	Terry Wilson Jr.	10/23, 33 yards, 1 INT
New Mexico	Rushing	Aaron Dumas	10 carries, 49 yards
New Mexico	Receiving	Emmanuel Logan–Greene	3 receptions, 16 yards
Texas A&M	Passing	Zach Calzada	19/33, 275 yards, 3 TDs, 1 INT
Texas A&M	Rushing	Isaiah Spiller	15 carries, 117 yards, 1 TD
Texas A&M	Receiving	Demond Demas	2 receptions, 100 yards, 1 TD

=== At UTEP ===
New Mexico at UTEP

Team	1	2	3	4	Total
Lobos	7	6	0	0	13
• Miners	0	3	14	3	20

- Date: September 25, 2021
- Location: Sun Bowl
  El Paso, TX
- Game start: 7:05 p.m. MDT
- Elapsed time: 3 hours and 14 minutes
- Game attendance: 15,069
- Game weather: Temperature: 81 °F (27 °C) • Weather: Cloudy • Wind: N 12mph
- Referee: Craig Helser
- TV announcers (ESPN+): Erik Elken (play–by–play) and Trevor Vittatoe (analyst)

Statistics	New Mexico	UTEP
First downs	17	12
Total yards	288	344
Rushing yards	123	51
Passing yards	165	293
Turnovers	2	1
Time of possession	29:52	30:08

Team	Category	Player	Statistics
New Mexico	Passing	Terry Wilson Jr.	16/38, 160 yards, INT
New Mexico	Rushing	Aaron Dumas	8 carries, 28 yards
New Mexico	Receiving	Kyle Jarvis	4 receptions, 59 yards
UTEP	Passing	Gavin Hardison	15/29, 293 yards, TD, INT
UTEP	Rushing	Ronald Awatt	12 carries, 34 yards
UTEP	Receiving	Jacob Cowing	7 receptions, 174 yards, TD

=== Air Force ===
Air Force at New Mexico

Team	1	2	3	4	Total
• Falcons	7	17	7	7	38
Lobos	0	0	7	3	10

- Date: October 2, 2021
- Location: University Stadium
  Albuquerque, NM
- Game start: 5:30 p.m. MDT
- Game attendance: 13,158
- TV announcers (FS2): Dan Hellie (play-by-play) and Robert Smith (analyst)

Statistics	Air Force	New Mexico
First downs	24	14
Total yards	441	226
Rushing yards	408	47
Passing yards	33	179
Turnovers	0	3
Time of possession	41:53	18:07

Team	Category	Player	Statistics
Air Force	Passing	Haaziq Daniels	1/2, 33 yards
Air Force	Rushing	Brad Roberts	28 carries, 142 yards, 2 TD
Air Force	Receiving	Brandon Lewis	1 Reception, 33 yards
New Mexico	Passing	Terry Wilson Jr.	14/23, 179 yards, 1 TD, 1 INT
New Mexico	Rushing	Aaron Dumas	3 carries, 15 yards
New Mexico	Receiving	Luke Wysong	3 receptions, 70 yards

=== At No. 25 San Diego State ===
New Mexico at San Diego State

Team	1	2	3	4	Total
Lobos	0	0	7	0	7
• No. 25 Aztecs	7	10	7	7	31

- Date: October 9, 2021
- Location: Dignity Health Sports Park
  Carson, CA
- Game start: 6:10 p.m. PDT
- Elapsed time: 3 hours and 5 minutes
- Game attendance: 8,387
- Game weather: Temperature: 69 °F (21 °C) • Weather: Sunny • Wind: N 5 mph
- Referee: Timothy Davis
- TV announcers (FS1): Alex Faust (play-by-play) and Petros Papadakis (analyst)

Scoring summary
1	11:21	SDSU	Greg Bell 1–yard run (Matt Araiza kick) (6 plays, 63 yards, 2:01)	SDSU 7–0
2	14:57	SDSU	Matt Araiza 40-yard field goal (10 plays, 48 yards, 3:11)	SDSU 10–0
2	4:35	SDSU	Jordon Brookshire 1-yard run (Matt Araiza kick) (10 plays, 66 yards, 5:29)	SDSU 17–0
3	4:41	UNM	Ray Leutele 15-yard fumble return (Andrew Shelley kick) (2 plays, 6 yards, 0:42)	SDSU 17–7
3	2:35	SDSU	Jordon Brookshire 11-yard run (Matt Araiza kick) (5 plays, 60 yards, 1:59)	SDSU 24–7
4	13:05	SDSU	Chance Bell 8-yard run (Matt Araiza kick) (6 plays, 66 yards, 2:52)	SDSU 31–7

Statistics	New Mexico	San Diego State
First downs	12	19
Total yards	193	336
Rushing yards	66	203
Passing yards	127	133
Turnovers	2	1
Time of possession	28:59	31:01

Team	Category	Player	Statistics
New Mexico	Passing	Terry Wilson Jr.	13/25, 127 yards, INT
New Mexico	Rushing	Aaron Dumas	11 carries, 77 yards
New Mexico	Receiving	Luke Wysong	4 receptions, 51 yards
San Diego State	Passing	Jordon Brookshire	11/24, 130 yards
San Diego State	Rushing	Greg Bell	21 carries, 111 yards, TD
San Diego State	Receiving	Tyrell Shavers	2 receptions, 39 yards

=== Colorado State ===
Colorado State at New Mexico

Team	1	2	3	4	Total
• Rams	7	6	10	13	36
Lobos	0	7	0	0	7

- Date: October 16, 2021
- Location: University Stadium
  Albuquerque, NM
- Game start: 5:06 p.m. MDT
- Elapsed time: 3 hours and 32 minutes
- Game attendance: 15,403
- Game weather: Temperature: 67 °F (19 °C) • Weather: Sunny • Wind: N 7 mph
- Referee: Cal McNeill
- Television network: Stadium

Statistics	Colorado State	New Mexico
First downs	21	11
Total yards	452	69
Rushing yards	163	53
Passing yards	289	16
Turnovers	0	3
Time of possession	34:16	25:44

Team	Category	Player	Statistics
Colorado State	Passing	Todd Centeio	16/25, 289 yards, TD
Colorado State	Rushing	David Bailey	21 carries, 58 yards, 2 TD
Colorado State	Receiving	Trey McBride	7 receptions, 135 yards
New Mexico	Passing	C. J. Montes	3/19, 11 yards, 2 INT
New Mexico	Rushing	Aaron Dumas	14 carries, 68 yards
New Mexico	Receiving	Zarak Scruggs Jr.	3 receptions, 10 yards

=== At Wyoming ===
New Mexico at Wyoming

Team	1	2	3	4	Total
• Lobos	7	7	0	0	14
Cowboys	0	3	0	0	3

- Date: October 23, 2021
- Location: War Memorial Stadium
  Laramie, WY
- Game start: 1:36 p.m. MDT
- Elapsed time: 2 hours and 42 minutes
- Game attendance: 20,133
- Game weather: Sunny
- Referee: Christian Watson
- TV announcers (Stadium): Chris Vosters (play-by-play) and Sed Bonner (analyst)

Scoring summary
1	1:22	UNM	Trace Brucker 43-yard touchdown reception from Isaiah Chavez (Andrew Shelley kick) (9 plays, 77 yards, 5:28)	UNM 7–0
2	4:30	WYO	John Hoyland 27-yard field goal (9 plays, 62 yards, 4:16)	UNM 7–3
2	0:29	UNM	Aaron Dumas 2-yard touchdown run (Andrew Shelley kick) (8 plays, 75 yards, 4:01)	UNM 14–3

Statistics	New Mexico	Wyoming
First downs	12	16
Total yards	259	255
Rushing yards	147	108
Passing yards	112	147
Turnovers	0	2
Time of possession	34:14	25:46

Team	Category	Player	Statistics
New Mexico	Passing	Isaiah Chavez	10/11, 112 yards, TD
New Mexico	Rushing	Isaiah Chavez	16 carries, 49 yards
New Mexico	Receiving	Isaiah Chavez	2 receptions, 46 yards
Wyoming	Passing	Sean Chambers	11/23, 96 yards, INT
Wyoming	Rushing	Xazavian Valladay	14 carries, 41 yards
Wyoming	Receiving	Isaiah Neyor	2 receptions, 45 yards

=== UNLV ===
UNLV at New Mexico

Team	1	2	3	4	Total
• Rebels	7	14	3	7	31
Lobos	7	10	0	0	17

- Date: November 6, 2021
- Location: University Stadium
  Albuquerque, NM
- Game start: 5:07 p.m. MDT
- Elapsed time: 3 hours and 16 minutes
- Game attendance: 14,007
- Game weather: Temperature: 73 °F (23 °C) • Weather: Sunny • Wind: S 2 mph
- Referee: Timothy Davis
- TV announcers (Stadium): Ari Wolfe (play-by-play) and Max Browne (analyst)

Statistics	UNLV	New Mexico
First downs	15	13
Total yards	304	296
Rushing yards	77	260
Passing yards	227	36
Turnovers	2	3
Time of possession	28:39	31:21

Team	Category	Player	Statistics
UNLV	Passing	Cameron Friel	20/33, 227 yards, 2 TD, INT
UNLV	Rushing	Charles Williams	22 carries, 74 yards, 2 TD
UNLV	Receiving	Kyle Williams	7 receptions, 137 yards, TD
New Mexico	Passing	C. J. Montes	7/13, 28 yards
New Mexico	Rushing	Aaron Dumas	15 carries, 92 yards
New Mexico	Receiving	Elijah Queen	1 reception, 13 yards

=== At Fresno State ===
New Mexico at Fresno State

Team	1	2	3	4	Total
Lobos	0	0	7	0	7
• Bulldogs	7	17	10	0	34

- Date: November 13, 2021
- Location: Bulldog Stadium
  Fresno, CA
- Game start: 4:06 p.m. PST
- Elapsed time: 2 hours and 57 minutes
- Game attendance: 35,020
- Game weather: Temperature: 67 °F (19 °C) • Weather: Sunny • Wind: NW 3 mph
- Referee: Kevin Hassell
- TV announcers (Stadium): Ari Wolfe (play-by-play) and JJ Raterink (analyst)

Scoring summary
1	10:33	FRES	Ronnie Rivers 4-yard run (Cesar Silva kick) (6 plays, 31 yards, 3:25)	FRES 7–0
2	13:31	FRES	Raymond Pauwels Jr. 23-yard pass from Jake Haener (Cesar Silva kick) (9 plays, 71 yards, 4:19)	FRES 14–0
2	6:42	FRES	Josh Kelly 21-yard pass from Jake Haener (Cesar Silva kick) (9 plays, 64 yards, 5:00)	FRES 21–0
2	0:28	FRES	Cesar Silva 51–yard field goal (10 plays, 38 yards, 3:53)	FRES 24–0
3	13:22	FRES	Cesar Silva 48-yard field goal (6 plays, 29 yards, 1:38)	FRES 27–0
3	7:45	UNM	Aaron Dumas 1-yard run (Andrew Shelley kick) (10 plays, 74 yards, 5:29)	FRES 27–7
3	4:40	FRES	Jordan Mims 4-yard pass from Jake Haener (Cesar Silva kick) (6 plays, 75 yards, 2:59)	FRES 34–7

Statistics	New Mexico	Fresno State
First downs	7	23
Total yards	196	399
Rushing yards	162	97
Passing yards	196	397
Turnovers	1	1
Time of possession	26:40	33:20

Team	Category	Player	Statistics
New Mexico	Passing	Isaiah Chavez	2/7, 34 yards, INT
New Mexico	Rushing	Aaron Dumas	23 carries, 143 yards, TD
New Mexico	Receiving	Trace Bruckler	1 reception, 25 yards
Fresno State	Passing	Jake Haener	24/31, 300 yards, 3 TD
Fresno State	Rushing	Ronnie Rivers	20 carries, 71 yards, TD
Fresno State	Receiving	Jordan Mims	4 receptions, 103 yards, TD

=== At Boise State ===
New Mexico at Boise State

Team	1	2	3	4	Total
Lobos	0	0	0	0	0
• Broncos	10	14	6	7	37

- Date: November 20, 2021
- Location: Albertsons Stadium
  Boise, ID
- Game start: 7:15 p.m. MST
- Game attendance: 28,542
- Game weather: Temperature: 39 °F (4 °C) • Weather: Sunny • Wind: NE 4 MPH
- Referee: Mike Cuttone
- TV announcers (FS1): Alex Faust (play-by-play) and Petros Papadakis (analyst)

Scoring summary
1	12:33	BSU	Tyreque Jones 7-yard blocked punt return (Jonah Dalmas kick) (3 plays, -2 yards, 2:21)	BSU 7–0
1	0:13	BSU	Jonah Dalmas 27-yard field goal (11 plays, 35 yards, 5:15)	BSU 10–0
2	13:39	BSU	Dylan Herberg 6-yard return of blocked punt (Jonah Dalmas kick) (3 plays, 4 yards, 1:25)	BSU 17–0
2	0:00	BSU	Khalil Shakir 56-yard pass from Hank Bachmeier (Jonah Dalmas kick) (2 plays, 56 yards, 0:17)	BSU 24–0
3	6:13	BSU	Jonah Dalmas 46–yard field goal (9 plays, 35 yards, 3:45)	BSU 27–0
3	1:03	BSU	Jonah Dalmas 42-yard field goal (8 plays, 56 yards, 1:49)	BSU 30–0
4	10:48	BSU	Jack Sears 1-yard run (Jonah Dalmas kick) (9 plays, 62 yards, 3:16)	BSU 37–0

Statistics	New Mexico	Boise State
First downs	9	23
Total yards	101	427
Rushing yards	83	239
Passing yards	18	188
Turnovers	2	1
Time of possession	29:24	30:36

Team	Category	Player	Statistics
New Mexico	Passing	Connor Genal	1/5, 16 yards, INT
New Mexico	Rushing	Aaron Dumas	15 carries, 36 yards
New Mexico	Receiving	Trace Bruckler	1 reception, 16 yards
Boise State	Passing	Hank Bachmeier	11/22, 146 yards, TD, INT
Boise State	Rushing	George Holani	14 carries, 114 yards
Boise State	Receiving	Khalil Shakir	7 receptions, 116 yards, TD

=== Utah State ===
Utah State at New Mexico

Team	1	2	3	4	Total
• Aggies	7	21	7	0	35
Lobos	0	0	3	7	10

- Date: November 26, 2021
- Location: University Stadium
  Albuquerque, NM
- Game start: 11:05 a.m. MST
- Elapsed time: 3 hours and 14 minutes
- Game attendance: 11,046
- Game weather: Temperature: 39 °F (4 °C) • Weather: Sunny • Wind: S 7 mph
- Referee: Cal McNeill
- TV announcers (FS1): Guy Haberman (play-by-play) and Will Blackmon (analyst)

Scoring summary
1	8:42	USU	Derek Wright 27-yard pass from Logan Bonner (Connor Coles kick) (4 plays, 66 yards, 1:08)	USU 7–0
2	13:48	USU	Jordan Nathan 39-yard pass from Logan Bonner (Connor Coles kick) (4 plays, 80 yards, 1:02)	USU 14–0
2	8:09	USU	Brandon Bowling 36-yard pass from Logan Bonner (Connor Coles kick) (8 plays, 86 yards, 3:16)	USU 21–0
2	5:19	USU	Derek Wright 76-yard pass from Logan Bonner (Connor Coles kick) (3 plays, 80 yards, 0:44)	USU 28–0
3	5:57	USU	Justin McGriff 10-yard pass from Logan Bonner (Connor Coles kick) (8 plays, 66 yards, 2:58)	USU 35–0
3	1:04	UNM	Andrew Shelley 41–yard field goal (10 plays, 51 yards, 4:53)	USU 35–3
4	4:18	UNM	Kyle Jarvis 12-yard pass from Bryson Carroll (Andrew Shelley kick) (7 plays, 48 yards, 2:58)	USU 35–10

Statistics	Utah State	New Mexico
First downs	18	16
Total yards	440	186
Rushing yards	116	101
Passing yards	324	85
Turnovers	0	2
Time of possession	24:41	35:19

Team	Category	Player	Statistics
Utah State	Passing	Logan Bonner	16/23, 312 yards, 5 TD
Utah State	Rushing	Calvin Tyler Jr.	10 carries, 37 yards
Utah State	Receiving	Deven Thompkins	5 receptions, 35 yards
New Mexico	Passing	Bryson Carroll	8/10, 57 yards, TD
New Mexico	Rushing	Peyton Dixon	23 carries, 95 yards
New Mexico	Receiving	Bobby Wooden	4 receptions, 16 yards

== Roster ==
2021 New Mexico Lobos football team roster
Players
Coaches
Offense

Pos.	#	Name	Class
QB	2	Terry Wilson Jr.	Sr
WR	3	Jace Taylor	So
RB	4	Bobby Wooden	So
QB	6	Isaiah Chavez	Fr
QB	9	Bear Milacek	Fr
QB	10	Trae Hall	Jr
QB	11	C. J. Montes	Fr
QB	12	Brandt Hughes	Sr
WR	13	C.J. Boone	So
WR	15	Luke Wysong	Fr
QB	16	Connor Genal	So
WR	17	Emmanuel Logan–Greene	Sr
WR	19	Zarak Scruggs Jr.	Jr
WR	19	Trace Bruckler	Fr
TE	20	Jacob Trussell	Fr
RB	21	Chad Alexander	So
RB	22	Aaron Dumas	Fr
RB	23	Jordan Guidry	Fr
WR	24	Keyonta Lanier	Fr
RB	28	Josh Foley	So
RB	30	Jeston Webskowski	Fr
RB	34	Bobby Cole	Sr
RB	37	Kendal Taylor	So
WR	38	Jathan Washington	Fr
TE	41	Connor Witthoft	Fr
TE	47	Caleb Marra	Fr
TE	48	Simon Gay	Fr
OL	55	Radson Jang	Sr
OL	56	Austin Cook	Sr
OL	57	Clement Ulale	Fr
OL	59	Jack Buford	So
OL	62	Chris Lovato	Fr
C	64	Kyle Stapley	Sr
OL	65	Nathaniel Gomez	Fr
OL	66	Jacob Jankoviak	Sr
OL	67	Isaak Gutierrez	Jr
OL	68	Shancco Matautia	Fr
OL	70	Isaiah Sillemon	Fr
OL	71	Ben Davis	Sr
OL	72	Jer'Marques Bailey	Fr
OL	73	Cade Briggs	Jr
OL	74	Greg Brown II	Fr
OL	75	Leke Asenuga	Fr
OL	76	Vincent Santos	Fr
OL	77	Larry Luna	Fr
OL	78	Arrison Cole	Fr
OL	79	Walter Baca	Fr
WR	80	Ryan Cosper	Fr
WR	81	Elijah Queen	So
WR	82	Austin Erickson	Fr
WR	83	Blake Wells	Sr
WR	83	Blake Wells	Sr
WR	84	Joah Flores	Fr
TE	85	Kyle Jarvis	Sr
WR	87	Andrew Erickson	So
WR	88	Benji Johnson	Fr
TE	89	Conner Kinslow	So

Defense

Pos.	#	Name	Class
CB	2	Tony Collier	Sr
S	3	Patrick Peek	Sr
S	4	Shaddrick Lowery	Sr
LB	5	James Lewis	Sr
S	7	Tavian Combs	So
CB	8	Donte Martin	Jr
S	9	Jerrick Reed II	Sr
DB	11	Xavier Hailey	Fr
CB	12	Antonio Hunt	Jr
DB	14	Ronald Wilson	Fr
DB	15	Damon Gentry	Fr
DE	17	Ben Bertram	Jr
LB	18	Alec Marenco	Fr
LB	19	Devin Sanders	Sr
DB	20	Andrell Barney Jr.	Fr
CB	21	A.J. Odums	Fr
LB	22	Darius McCray	Fr
LB	23	Reco Hannah	Sr
DB	24	Coryon Francis	Fr
S	25	Marqaue Kirkendoll	So
CB	26	Nic Wilson	Jr
S	27	Quinn Potts	Fr
CB	29	Donald Jones	Fr
LB	30	Ray Leutele	So
S	31	Mathias Bertram	Fr
LB	32	Ernesto Acuna	Fr
LB	33	Josh Howes	Fr
DB	34	Michael Garcia	Fr
LB	35	Semaj Sims	Fr
LB	36	Syaire Riley	So
LB	38	Quinten Thomas	Fr
DE	39	Kyler Drake	Fr
LB	41	Dion Hunter	Fr
LB	45	Joshua Woisin	Sr
LB	50	Ja'Shon Lowery	Fr
DE	51	Bryce Santana	Fr
DL	52	Ian Shewell	So
DL	53	Larry Allen	So
NT	54	Langston Murray	Sr
LB	55	J.D. Roberts	Fr
NT	57	Keith Alvarado	Fr
LB	58	Cody Moon	Fr
LB	84	Jeffrey Blake	So
NT	90	O.J. Bartley	Fr
DE	91	Adam Gay	Sr
DE	92	Omar Darame	So
DE	93	Jaden Phillips	Fr
DE	95	Jake Saltonstall	Jr
CB	96	Corey Hightower	Sr
DE	97	Justin Harris	Sr
DE	98	Joey Noble	Sr
NT	99	Ben Gansallo	Sr

Special teams

Pos.	#	Name	Class
PK	26	Cameron Newell	Fr
PK	35	George Steinkamp	Sr
LS	46	Isaiah Perez	Fr
P	47	Jared Long	Fr
LS	48	Troy Sicaeros	So
N/A	86	Kai Jessie	Fr
PK	94	Andrew Shelley	Sr

Head coach

- Danny Gonzales (New Mexico)

Coordinators/assistant coaches

- Derek Warehime (Tulsa)
  Offensive Coordinator
  Tight Ends
- Rocky Long (New Mexico)
  Defensive Coordinator
  Linebackers
- Jamie Christian (Fresno State and Central Washington)
  Special Teams Coordinator
- Drew Mehringer (Rice and Ohio State)
  Passing Game Coordinator
  Quarterbacks
- David Howes (New Mexico State and New Mexico)
  Safeties
- Brandon Blackmon (Mt. San Antonio, Purdue and Tennessee State)
  Wide Receivers
- Jerome Haywood (San Diego State)
  Defensive Line
- Troy Reffett (UTEP)
  Cornerbacks
- Jordan Somerville (Arizona State)
  Running Backs
- Jason Lenzmeier (New Mexico)
  Offensive Line
- Dante Caro (New Mexico)
  Defensive Graduate Assistant
- Jake Rothschiller (New Mexico)
  Defensive Graduate Assistant
- Matt Clark (Eastern Kentucky and Western Illinois)
  Offensive Graduate Assistant
- Gray Curtis (Southern Miss)
  Offensive Graduate Assistant

Support staff

- James Carson (Bucknell)
  Director of Athletic Performance
- Nate Matos (Arizona State and Western Illinois)
  Football Assistant Director
- Gavin Bevis (Southwestern and Pittsburg State)
  Co–Director of Operations
- Jordan Fiske (UMass)
  Athletic Performance Graduate Assistant
- Chris Schieder (Cincinnati)
  Football Equipment Operations Specialist
- Paul Kasero
  Videographer
- Tara Arrieta (New Mexico)
  Administrative Assistant

Legend

- (C) Team captain
- (S) Suspended
- (I) Ineligible
- Injured
- Redshirt

Roster
Last update: August 19, 2021
