= 2021 Mountain West Conference Football Championship Game =

- Conference Championship
Utah State Aggies	San Diego State Aztecs
(9–3)	(11–1)
46	13
Head coach: Blake Anderson	Head coach: Brady Hoke
	AP / Coaches / CFP; 19 / 19 / 19
	1	2	3	4	Total
Utah State	0	14	15	17	46
San Diego State	0	3	3	7	13
- Date: December 4, 2021
- Season: 2021
- Stadium: Dignity Health Sports Park
- Location: Carson, CA
- Favorite: San Diego State by 6
- Referee: Michael Vandervelde
- Attendance: 13,445

United States TV coverage
- Network: Fox
- Announcers: Joe Davis (play by play), Brock Huard (color), and Bruce Feldman (sideline reporter)

2021 Mountain West Conference football standings
	Conf.			Overall
Team	W		L	W		L
Mountain Division
No. 24 Utah State xy$	6	–	2	11	–	3
Air Force x	6	–	2	10	–	3
Boise State	5	–	3	7	–	5
Wyoming	2	–	6	7	–	6
Colorado State	2	–	6	3	–	9
New Mexico	1	–	7	3	–	9
West Division
No. 25 San Diego State xy	7	–	1	12	–	2
Fresno State	6	–	2	10	–	3
Nevada	5	–	3	8	–	5
Hawaii	3	–	5	6	–	7
San Jose State	3	–	5	5	–	7
UNLV	2	–	6	2	–	10
Championship: Utah State 46, San Diego State 13
$ – Conference champion; x – Division champion/co-champions; y – Championship game participant; Rankings from AP Poll

The 2021 Mountain West Conference Football Championship Game was a college football game played on December 4, 2021, at Dignity Health Sports Park in Carson, California. It was the ninth edition of the Mountain West Conference Football Championship Game and determined the champion of the Mountain West Conference (MWC) for the 2021 season. The game began at 12:00 p.m. PST and was aired on Fox. The game featured the Utah State Aggies, the Mountain Division champions, and the San Diego State Aztecs, the West Division champions. San Diego State won the right to host the game as a result of having the better conference record between the two teams.

== Teams ==
=== Utah State Aggies ===
Utah State clinched the Mountain Division championship with a victory at New Mexico on November 26. The Aggies finished with a conference record of 6–2 and held the head-to-head tiebreaker over Air Force thanks to their win over the Falcons on September 18. Utah State will be making their first conference championship game appearance since the inaugural contest in 2013, and are seeking their first Mountain West Conference championship.

=== San Diego State Aztecs ===
San Diego State clinched the West Division championship outright with a conference record of 7–1 after beating Boise State on November 26. The Aztecs will be making their first conference championship game appearance since their victory in 2016.

This was the Aztecs' final game at their temporary home of Dignity Health Sports Park. They will move into their new home of Aztec Stadium, built on the site of their former home of San Diego Stadium, in 2022.

== Game summary ==
2021 Mountain West Conference Football Championship Game

Quarter	1	2	3	4	Total
Utah State	0	14	15	17	46
No. 19 San Diego State	0	3	3	7	13

at Dignity Health Sports Park • Carson, California

- Date: December 4, 2021
- Game time: 12:00 p.m. PST
- Game attendance: 13,445
- Referee: Michael Vandervelde
- TV: Fox
- Box score

Scoring summary

Quarter	Time	Drive			Team	Scoring information	Score	
Quarter	Time	Plays	Yards	TOP	Team	Scoring information	Utah State	San Diego State
2	9:06	10	53	4:29	Utah State	Derek Wright 5-yard touchdown reception from Logan Bonner, Connor Coles kick good	7	0
2	4:57	6	63	1:31	Utah State	Calvin Tyler Jr. 1-yard touchdown run, Connor Coles kick good	14	0
2	1:01	10	77	3:52	San Diego State	23-yard field goal by Matt Araiza	14	3
3	13:09	5	75	1:51	Utah State	Brandon Bowling 58-yard touchdown reception from Logan Bonner, Connor Coles kick good	21	3
3	11:38				Utah State	Fumble through the back of the end zone, safety	23	3
3	6:58	8	21	2:57	San Diego State	36-yard field goal by Matt Araiza	23	6
3	1:54	6	35	3:25	Utah State	Brandon Bowling 18-yard touchdown reception from Logan Bonner, Connor Coles kick failed	29	6
4	13:40	7	17	2:59	Utah State	23-yard field goal by Connor Coles	32	6
4	10:21	5	40	2:01	Utah State	Justin McGriff 9-yard touchdown reception from Logan Bonner, Connor Coles kick good	39	6
4	6:22	8	80	3:59	San Diego State	Jesse Matthews 5-yard touchdown reception from Jalen Mayden, Matt Araiza kick good	39	13
4	3:58				Utah State	Fumble recovery returned 0 yards for touchdown by J. Nathan, Connor Coles kick good	46	13
"TOP" = time of possession. For other American football terms, see Glossary of American football.							46	13

=== Statistics ===
Statistics	USU	SDSU
First downs	23	17
Plays–yards	71–383	68–315
Rushes–yards	28–65	39–148
Passing yards	318	167
Passing: comp–att–int	29–43–1	16–29–0
Time of possession	28:58	31:02

Team	Category	Player	Statistics
Utah State	Passing	Logan Bonner	29/43, 318 yards, 4 TDs, 1 INT
Utah State	Rushing	Calvin Tyler Jr.	17 carries, 41 yards, 1 TD
Utah State	Receiving	Brandon Bowling	8 receptions, 154 yards, 2 TDs
San Diego State	Passing	Jordon Brookshire	11/23, 117 yards
San Diego State	Rushing	Greg Bell	11 carries, 50 yards
San Diego State	Receiving	Jesse Matthews	8 receptions, 82 yards, 1 TD
