= Bo Richter =

American football player (born 2000)

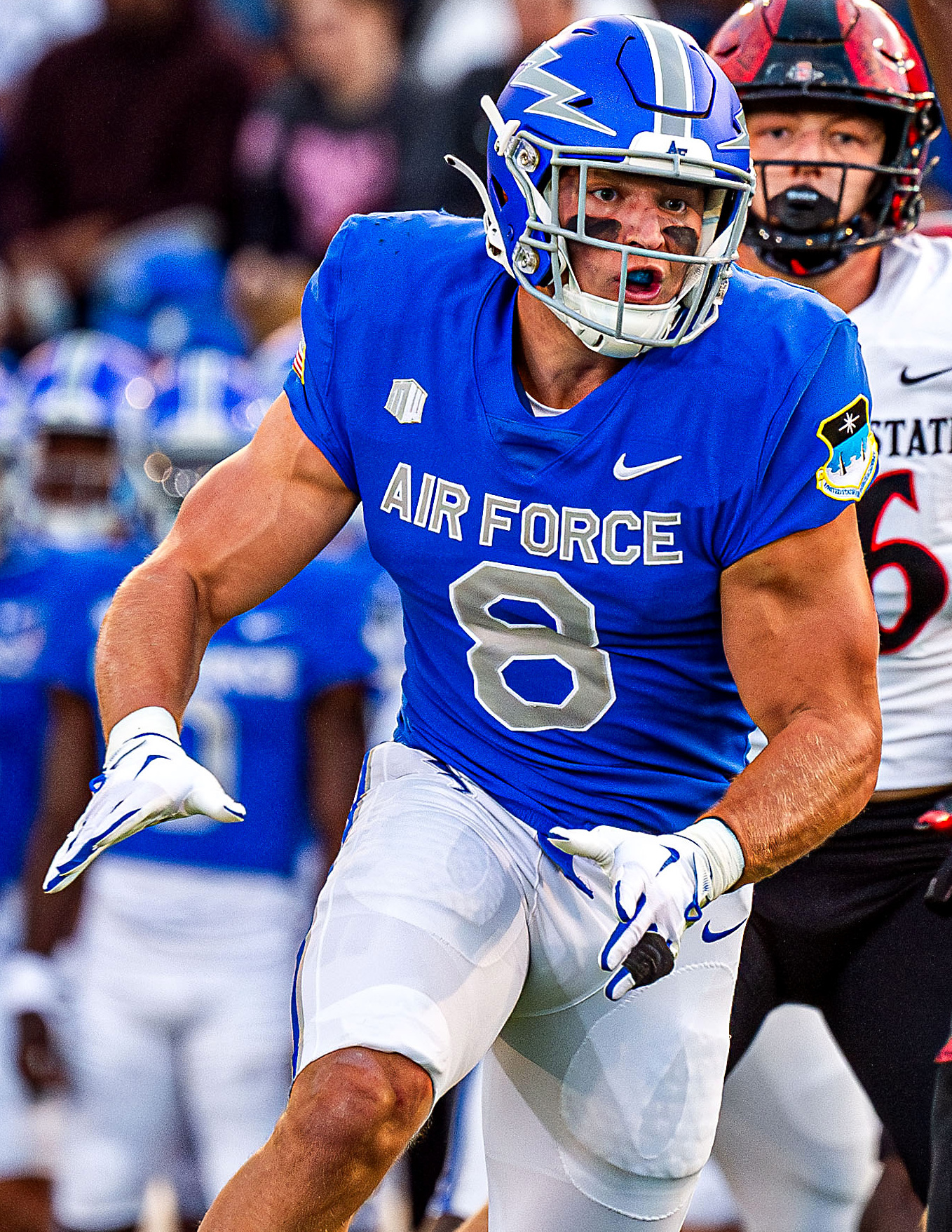
- Richter with the Air Force Falcons in 2023

No. 98 – Minnesota Vikings
- Position: Outside linebacker
- Roster status: Injured reserve

Personal information
- Born: August 13, 2000 (age 26); Naperville, Illinois, U.S.
- Listed height: 6 ft 1 in (1.85 m)
- Listed weight: 248 lb (112 kg)

Career information
- High school: Naperville North
- College: Air Force (2019–2023)
- NFL draft: 2024: undrafted

Career history
- Minnesota Vikings (2024–present)

Awards and highlights
- First-team All-MW (2023)

Career NFL statistics as of Week 10, 2026
- Total tackles: 25
- Fumble recoveries: 1
- Pass deflections: 1
- Stats at Pro Football Reference

Bo Richter (born August 13, 2000) is an American professional football outside linebacker for the Minnesota Vikings of the National Football League (NFL). He played college football for the Air Force Falcons.

== Early life ==
Richter attended Naperville North High School located in Naperville, Illinois. Coming out of high school, Richter committed to play college football for the Air Force Falcons.

== College career ==
During Richter's first two seasons in 2019, and 2020, he did not appear in any games for the Falcons. In the 2021 First Responder Bowl, Richter notched three tackles, with half of one being for a loss, in a victory over Louisville. Richter finished the 2021 season tallying 13 tackles with one and a half being for a loss, a sack and a half, a pass deflection, and an interception. In the 2022 season, Richter totaled 26 tackles with five and a half going for a loss. During Richter's final collegiate game in the 2023 Armed Forces Bowl, Richter totaled four and a half tackles for a loss, and three sacks, as he helped Air Force to a win over James Madison. Richter finished the 2023 season recording 45 tackles with 19.5 being for a loss, ten sacks, and three forced fumbles, en route to being named first-team all-Mountain West.

== Professional career ==
Pre-draft measurables
Height	Weight	Arm length	Hand span	Wingspan	40-yard dash	10-yard split	20-yard split	Vertical jump	Broad jump	Bench press
6 ft 0 7/8 in (1.85 m)	248 lb (112 kg)	30 5/8 in (0.78 m)	9 7/8 in (0.25 m)	6 ft 3 3/4 in (1.92 m)	4.56 s	1.56 s	2.57 s	40 in (1.02 m)	10 ft 4 in (3.15 m)	24 reps
All values from Pro Day

After not being selected in the 2024 NFL draft, Richter signed with the Minnesota Vikings as an undrafted free agent. Richter was also selected in the sixth round of the 2024 UFL draft by the Arlington Renegades. He was waived on August 27, and re-signed to the practice squad. He was signed to the active roster on October 22, 2024.

On March 9, 2026, Richter re-signed with the Vikings. On November 18, he was placed on the Vikings injured reserve list after he suffered a foot injury in week 10 game against the Packers.

== Personal life ==
Richter is the nephew of former New York Giants quarterback, Kent Graham.
