= Blake Anderson (American football) =

American football player and coach (born 1969)

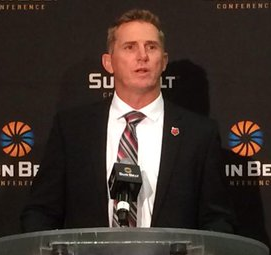
- Anderson at the 2015 Sun Belt Media Day

Current position
- Title: Head coach
- Team: Southern Miss
- Conference: Sun Belt
- Record: 3-9

Biographical details
- Born: March 24, 1969 (age 57); Jonesboro, Arkansas, U.S.

Playing career
- 1987–1989: Baylor
- 1989–1991: Sam Houston State
- Positions: Quarterback, wide receiver

Coaching career (HC unless noted)
- 1992: Eastern New Mexico (GA)
- 1993: Eastern New Mexico (WR)
- 1994: Howard Payne (WR)
- 1995–1997: Trinity Valley (QB/WR/DB/RC)
- 1998: Trinity Valley (OC)
- 1999–2000: New Mexico (RB)
- 2001: New Mexico (WR)
- 2002–2004: Middle Tennessee (co-OC/WR)
- 2007: Louisiana–Lafayette (OC/QB)
- 2008–2009: Southern Miss (RGC/QB)
- 2010–2011: Southern Miss (OC/QB)
- 2012–2013: North Carolina (OC/QB)
- 2014–2020: Arkansas State
- 2021–2023: Utah State
- 2025: Southern Miss (OC/QB)
- 2026–present: Southern Miss

Head coaching record
- Overall: 76–63
- Bowls: 3–7

Accomplishments and honors

Championships
- 2 Sun Belt (2015, 2016); 1 MW (2021); 1 Sun Belt West Division (2018); 1 MW Mountain Division (2021)

Blake Robert Anderson (born March 24, 1969) is an American football coach and former player who is the current head coach at the University of Southern Mississippi. Anderson previously served as the head coach at Utah State University from 2021 to 2023, Arkansas State University from 2014 to 2020, the offensive coordinator at the University of North Carolina from 2012 to 2013, and the offensive coordinator, run game coordinator and quarterbacks coach at Southern Miss from 2009 to 2011.

== Playing career ==
Anderson began his playing career as a quarterback and wide receiver at Baylor University from 1987 to 1989, but tore his ACL during practice. After his recovery, he chose to transfer to Sam Houston State University where he played as a wide receiver for the Bearkats from 1989 to 1991. At Sam Houston State, he was named to the Southland Conference All-Academic team as a senior. During his college days, he played in the I formation and Veer offenses popular at the time. Sam Houston State defensive coordinator Mike Lucas told Anderson that he believed he was suited for a coaching role.

== Coaching career ==
=== Eastern New Mexico (1992–1993) ===
Anderson got his start from Howard Stearns at the Eastern New Mexico Greyhounds as a graduate assistant in 1992 and received a full-time position there tutoring wide receivers for the Greyhounds in 1993.

=== Howard Payne (1994) ===
In 1994, he coached wide receivers for the American Southwest Conference co-champion Howard Payne University Yellow Jackets under head coach Vance Gibson.

=== Trinity Valley (1995–1998) ===
Anderson joined Trinity Valley in 1995 as an assistant. He was the offensive coordinator during the Cardinals' run to the 1997 NJCAA National Championship under coach Scott Conley.

=== New Mexico (1999–2001) ===
Before the 1999 season, he joined New Mexico as running backs coach under Rocky Long and served in that position until 2000. During the 2001 season, he took the wide receivers coaching position. During the 2000 season his rushing attack averaged 148 yards per game which accounted for 56% of the team's offensive production.

=== Middle Tennessee (2002–2004) ===
In 2002 Middle Tennessee Blue Raiders coach Andy McCollum hired Anderson to serve as co-offensive coordinator and wide receivers coach in replacement of Larry Fedora who had left for Florida. At Middle Tennessee he was exposed to variations of the hurry-up offense which dramatically changed his outlook. The Blue Raiders passing offense increased each year under his tenure, improving from 154.0 yards per game in 2002 to 226.7 in 2003 and 267.7 in 2004. Anderson's offense led the Sun Belt Conference in scoring offense in 2003 and saw the school's first 1,000 yard receiver in 2004. After leaving Middle Tennessee he left coaching for three years for a stint in private business.

=== Louisiana–Lafayette (2007) ===
Anderson was hired by Coach Rickey Bustle as offensive coordinator and quarterbacks coach for the Louisiana Ragin' Cajuns for the 2007 football season, replacing Rob Christophel. Anderson's offense churned out over 250 yards per game on the ground, making it the #6 ranked rushing offense in the nation. The 2007 Ragin' Cajuns became the Sun Belt's first ever 3,000-yard rushing team.

=== Southern Miss (2008–2011) ===
Anderson joined Southern Miss Golden Eagles in 2008 as quarterbacks coach and run game coordinator under new coach Fedora. He mentored record-setting future National Football League quarterback Austin Davis during his freshman and sophomore years and was promoted to offensive coordinator for the 2010 season where the Golden Eagles averaged 36.9 points per game. Anderson was the play-caller during Southern Miss's 12-win season in 2011 including the Conference USA Football Championship Game victory over the previously unbeaten Houston Cougars. Southern Miss capped off the 2011 season with a 24–17 victory over Nevada in the Hawaii Bowl.

=== North Carolina (2012–2013) ===
When Fedora left Southern Miss for the North Carolina Tar Heels in 2012 he took Anderson along as his offensive coordinator and quarterbacks coach. In his inaugural season with the Tar Heels, Anderson oversaw an offense that produced 485.6 yards per game, setting over 35 school records, and ending the campaign ranked eighth in the nation in scoring. During the 2013 campaign his offense gained 432.4 yards per game.

=== Arkansas State (2014–2020) ===
Anderson was announced as Arkansas State's head coach on December 19, 2013. He became Arkansas State's fifth head coach in five years, replacing Bryan Harsin who had left for Boise State. Arkansas State played in 6 consecutive bowl games and won 2 Sun Belt conference championships under Anderson.

=== Utah State (2021–2023) ===
On December 12, 2020, Anderson was hired to be the head coach at Utah State University, replacing Gary Andersen. In his first season, he guided the team to an 11–3 record, winning the Mountain West championship against San Diego State and the inaugural LA Bowl against Oregon State. His second and third seasons saw the Aggies regress to back-to-back 6–7 records, both ending in bowl losses.

Utah State announced its intention to fire Anderson on July 2, 2024, prior to the start of the 2024 football season, which was made formal on July 18. Following an internal investigation, he was alleged to have been non-compliant with university rules regarding the reporting of complaints of sexual misconduct. Defensive coordinator Nate Dreiling succeeded Anderson as interim head coach.

=== Return to Southern Miss (2025– ) ===
On December 13, 2024, Anderson was named the returning offensive coordinator on new head coach Charles Huff's staff.

After Huff departed to become the head coach at Memphis, Anderson was promoted to head coach on December 11, 2025.

== Personal life ==
Anderson was born in Jonesboro, Arkansas, but moved to Hubbard, Texas, at an early age. He graduated from Hubbard High School. He obtained a degree in kinesiology from Sam Houston State in 1992 and his master's degree in sports administration from Eastern New Mexico University in 1994.

Anderson married his first wife, Wendy, in 1992. They had three children together: sons Coleton and Cason, and daughter Callie. Wendy died on August 20, 2019 at the age of 49, after public battle with an aggressive form of breast cancer. Defensive coordinator David Duggan coached the team during Anderson's leave. Following his move to Utah State, Anderson married the former Brittany King in 2021 and adopted her two daughters Collins and Ellison. Blake's son, Cason Anderson, died from suicide on February 28, 2022 at age 21. Blake and Brittany had a son together, Cannon, in 2024. Anderson is a Christian.

== Head coaching record ==
Year	Team	Overall	Conference	Standing	Bowl/playoffs	Coaches^{#}	AP^{°}
Arkansas State Red Wolves (Sun Belt Conference) (2014–2020)
2014	Arkansas State	7–6	5–3	T–4th	L GoDaddy		
2015	Arkansas State	9–4	8–0	1st	L New Orleans		
2016	Arkansas State	8–5	7–1	T–1st	W Cure		
2017	Arkansas State	7–5	6–2	3rd	L Camellia		
2018	Arkansas State	8–5	5–3	T–1st (West)	L Arizona		
2019	Arkansas State	8–5	5–3	2nd (West)	W Camellia		
2020	Arkansas State	4–7	2–6	T–3rd (West)			
Arkansas State:		51–37	38–18				
Utah State Aggies (Mountain West Conference) (2021–2023)
2021	Utah State	11–3	6–2	T–1st (Mountain)	W LA	24	24
2022	Utah State	6–7	5–3	T–3rd (Mountain)	L First Responder		
2023	Utah State	6–7	4–4	T–6th	L Famous Idaho Potato		
Utah State:		23–17	15–9				
Southern Miss Golden Eagles (Sun Belt Conference) (2025–present)
2025	Southern Miss	0–1			L New Orleans		
2026	Southern Miss	3–8	2–5	(West)			
Southern Miss:		3–9	2–5				
Total:		76–63					
National championship Conference title Conference division title or championship game berth
