= 2021 UNLV Rebels football team =

American college football season

2021 UNLV Rebels football
- Conference: Mountain West Conference
- West Division
- Record: 2–10 (2–6 MW)
- Head coach: Marcus Arroyo (2nd season)
- Offensive coordinator: Glenn Thomas (2nd season)
- Offensive scheme: Multiple
- Defensive coordinator: Peter Hansen (2nd season)
- Base defense: 4–3
- Home stadium: Allegiant Stadium

2021 Mountain West Conference football standings
	Conf.			Overall
Team	W		L	W		L
Mountain Division
No. 24 Utah State xy$	6	–	2	11	–	3
Air Force x	6	–	2	10	–	3
Boise State	5	–	3	7	–	5
Wyoming	2	–	6	7	–	6
Colorado State	2	–	6	3	–	9
New Mexico	1	–	7	3	–	9
West Division
No. 25 San Diego State xy	7	–	1	12	–	2
Fresno State	6	–	2	10	–	3
Nevada	5	–	3	8	–	5
Hawaii	3	–	5	6	–	7
San Jose State	3	–	5	5	–	7
UNLV	2	–	6	2	–	10
Championship: Utah State 46, San Diego State 13
$ – Conference champion; x – Division champion/co-champions; y – Championship game participant; Rankings from AP Poll

The 2021 UNLV Rebels football team represented the University of Nevada, Las Vegas (UNLV) as a member of the Mountain West Conference (MW) during the 2021 NCAA Division I FBS football season. Led by second-year head coach Marcus Arroyo, the Rebels compiled an overall record of 2–10 record with a mark of 2–6 in conference play, placing last out of six teams in the MW's West Division. The team played home games at Allegiant Stadium in Paradise, Nevada.

== Schedule ==
Date	Time	Opponent	Site	TV	Result	Attendance
September 2	7:00 p.m.	No. 11 (FCS) Eastern Washington*	Allegiant Stadium; Paradise, NV	Stadium	L 33–35 ^{2OT}	21,970
September 11	7:30 p.m.	at No. 23 Arizona State*	Sun Devil Stadium; Tempe, AZ	ESPN2	L 10–37	42,918
September 18	7:30 p.m.	No. 14 Iowa State*	Allegiant Stadium; Paradise, NV	CBSSN	L 3–48	35,193
September 24	7:00 p.m.	at No. 22 Fresno State	Bulldog Stadium; Fresno, CA	CBSSN	L 30–38	35,093
October 2	3:00 p.m.	at UTSA*	Alamodome; San Antonio, TX	ESPN+	L 17–24	20,154
October 16	4:00 p.m.	Utah State	Allegiant Stadium; Paradise, NV	CBSSN	L 24–28	21,322
October 21	8:00 p.m.	San Jose State	Allegiant Stadium; Paradise, NV	CBSSN	L 20–27	19,318
October 29	7:00 p.m.	at Nevada	Mackay Stadium; Reno, NV (Fremont Cannon)	CBSSN	L 20–51	28,960
November 6	4:00 p.m.	at New Mexico	University Stadium; Albuquerque, NM	Stadium	W 31–17	14,007
November 13	1:00 p.m.	Hawaii	Allegiant Stadium; Paradise, NV	SPEC PPV	W 27–13	19,623
November 19	8:30 p.m.	No. 19 San Diego State	Allegiant Stadium; Paradise, NV	CBSSN	L 20–28	16,713
November 26	12:30 p.m.	at Air Force	Falcon Stadium; Colorado Springs, CO	CBSSN	L 14–48	18,226
*Non-conference game; Rankings from AP Poll (and CFP Rankings, after November 2) - Released prior to game; All times are in Pacific time

== Preseason ==
=== Mountain West media days ===
The Mountain West media days were held on July 21–22, 2021, at the Cosmopolitan in Paradise, Nevada.

==== Media poll ====
The Mountain West preseason poll was released on July 21, 2021. The Rebels were predicted to finish in sixth place in the MW West Division.

== Game summaries ==
=== No. 11 (FCS) Eastern Washington ===
	1	2	3	4	OT	2OT	Total
No. 11 (FCS) Eagles	0	3	0	17	7	8	35
Rebels	0	6	0	14	7	6	33

=== At No. 23 Arizona State ===
	1	2	3	4	Total
Rebels	3	7	0	0	10
No. 23 Sun Devils	0	14	7	16	37

=== No. 14 Iowa State ===
	1	2	3	4	Total
No. 14 Cyclones	7	17	14	10	48
Rebels	0	0	3	0	3

=== At No. 22 Fresno State ===
	1	2	3	4	Total
Rebels	14	0	7	9	30
No. 22 Bulldogs	0	9	13	16	38

=== At UTSA ===
	1	2	3	4	Total
Rebels	7	3	0	7	17
Roadrunners	7	10	7	0	24

=== Utah State ===
	1	2	3	4	Total
Aggies	7	7	7	7	28
Rebels	17	0	7	0	24

=== San Jose State ===
	1	2	3	4	Total
Spartans	3	10	0	14	27
Rebels	7	10	3	0	20

=== At Nevada ===
	1	2	3	4	Total
Rebels	0	0	7	13	20
Wolf Pack	10	10	21	10	51

=== At New Mexico ===
	1	2	3	4	Total
Rebels	7	14	3	7	31
Lobos	7	10	0	0	17

=== Hawaii ===
	1	2	3	4	Total
Rainbow Warriors	10	0	0	3	13
Rebels	7	3	10	7	27

=== No. 19 San Diego State ===
	1	2	3	4	Total
No. 19 Aztecs	7	14	0	7	28
Rebels	3	7	10	0	20

=== At Air Force ===
	1	2	3	4	Total
Rebels	0	0	7	7	14
Falcons	14	10	17	7	48
