= Cooper Legas =

American football player (born 2000)

No. 5
- Position: Quarterback

Personal information
- Born: December 29, 2000 (age 25); Orem, Utah, U.S.
- Listed height: 6 ft 1 in (1.85 m)
- Listed weight: 216 lb (98 kg)

Career information
- High school: Orem (Orem, Utah)
- College: Utah State (2019–2023); Tulsa (2024)
- Stats at ESPN

Cooper Legas (/ləˈɡɑː/ lə-GAH; born December 29, 2000) is an American former football quarterback. He previously played for the Utah State Aggies and Tulsa Golden Hurricane.

== Early life ==
Legas grew up in Orem, Utah and attended Orem High School, where he was teammates with NFL players Noah Sewell, Kingsley Suamataia, Jakob Robinson and Puka Nacua, and where he won two state championships in football, track & field and wrestling. In his high school football career, Legas completed 555 of his 858 pass attempts for 9,770 yards, 101 touchdowns and 26 interceptions. Legas would also rush for 2,770 yards and 22 touchdowns, while also hauling in 12 receptions for 240 yards. Legas was a three-star rated recruit and would commit to play college football at Utah State University over offers from BYU, Navy, Air Force, Arkansas and Army.

== College career ==
=== Utah State ===
Legas was redshirted during his true freshman season in 2019. He would also not appear in any games during the 2020 season.

During the 2021 season, he appeared in two games. During the 2021 LA Bowl, he became the first FBS quarterback ever to throw a touchdown on his first collegiate pass in a bowl game.

During the 2022 season, he played in 10 games and started eight of them, finishing the season with completing 135 out of 221 passing attempts for 1,499 yards, 11 touchdowns and 10 interceptions. He also rushed for 303 yards on 108 carries with 1,802 total offensive yards.

During the 2023 season, he played in nine games and started seven of them, finishing the season with completing 138 out of 213 passing attempts for 1,815 yards, 19 touchdowns and eight interceptions. He also rushed for 122 yards on 68 carries.

Legas announced that he would return for the 2024 season as a super senior. However, on April 17, 2024, he would announce that he would enter the transfer portal.

=== Tulsa ===
On May 7, 2024, Legas announced that he would transfer to Tulsa.

=== Statistics ===
Season	Team	Games			Passing								Rushing			
Season	Team	GP	GS	Record	Comp	Att	Pct	Yards	Avg	TD	Int	Rate	Att	Yards	Avg	TD
2019	Utah State	Redshirt														
2020	Utah State	Did not play														
2021	Utah State	2	0	0–0	11	20	55.0	171	8.6	2	1	149.8	8	−14	−1.8	0
2022	Utah State	10	8	5–3	135	221	61.1	1,499	6.8	11	10	125.4	108	303	2.8	2
2023	Utah State	9	7	3–4	138	213	64.8	1,815	8.5	19	8	158.3	68	122	1.8	0
2024	Tulsa	11	5	0–5	87	162	53.7	1,144	7.1	12	6	130.1	79	201	2.5	1
Career		32	20	8–12	371	616	60.2	4,629	7.5	44	25	138.8	263	612	2.3	3

== Personal life ==
On June 14, 2024, Legas married his longtime girlfriend, Harley Daniel, who ran track for the University of Utah. Their son was born in December 2025.

He earned his bachelor's degree in Economics in the spring of 2023.
