= 2021 LA Bowl =

Postseason college football bowl game

2021 Jimmy Kimmel LA Bowl presented by Stifel
- 1st LA Bowl
Utah State Aggies	Oregon State Beavers
(10–3)	(7–5)
MWC	Pac-12
24	13
Head coach: Blake Anderson	Head coach: Jonathan Smith
	1	2	3	4	Total
Utah State	0	14	10	0	24
Oregon State	7	3	0	3	13
- Date: December 18, 2021
- Season: 2021
- Stadium: SoFi Stadium
- Location: Inglewood, California
- MVP: Nick Heninger (DE, Utah State); Deven Thompkins (WR, Utah State)
- Favorite: Oregon State by 6.5
- Referee: Jeff Servinski (Big Ten)
- Attendance: 29,896

United States TV coverage
- Network: ABC
- Announcers: Joe Tessitore (play-by-play), Greg McElroy (analyst), and Laura Rutledge (sideline)

The 2021 LA Bowl was a college football bowl game played on December 18, 2021, with kickoff at 7:30 p.m. EST (4:30 p.m. local PST) and broadcast on ABC. It was the inaugural edition of the LA Bowl (after the edition scheduled for 2020 was cancelled due to the COVID-19 pandemic), and was one of the 2021–22 bowl games concluding the 2021 FBS football season. Sponsored by late-night talk show host Jimmy Kimmel and independent investment bank Stifel, the game was officially known as the Jimmy Kimmel LA Bowl presented by Stifel.

== Teams ==
Consistent with conference tie-ins, the game was played between teams from the Mountain West Conference (MWC) and the Pac-12 Conference.

This was the fourth meeting between Utah State and Oregon State; the Beavers had won all three previous meetings.

=== Utah State Aggies ===
Utah State defeated No. 19 San Diego State, 46–13, in the 2021 Mountain West Conference Football Championship Game on December 4.

=== Oregon State Beavers ===
Oregon State, with a 7–5 record, was led by quarterback Chance Nolan who completed 183 of 288 passes for 2,414 yards and 19 touchdowns during the season. Top rusher for the team was B. J. Baylor, who rushed 209 times for 1,259 yards and 13 touchdowns. Trevon Bradford was the top receiver, having caught 40 passes for 606 yards and 5 touchdowns. On the defensive side, Avery Roberts led the team with 128 tackles, one interception, and one forced fumble.

== Game summary ==
2021 Jimmy Kimmel LA Bowl presented by Stifel

Quarter	1	2	3	4	Total
Utah State	0	14	10	0	24
Oregon State	7	3	0	3	13

at SoFi Stadium • Inglewood, California

- Date: Saturday, December 18, 2021
- Game time: 7:30 p.m. EST (4:30 p.m. local PST)
- Game weather: Sunny • Temperature: 62 °F (17 °C)
- Game attendance: 29,896
- Referee: Jeff Servinski
- TV announcers (ABC): Joe Tessitore (play-by-play), Greg McElroy (analyst), and Laura Rutledge (sideline)
- Box score

Scoring summary

Quarter	Time	Drive			Team	Scoring information	Score	
Quarter	Time	Plays	Yards	TOP	Team	Scoring information	USU	OSU
1	14:02	3	71	0:52	Oregon State	Jesiah Irish 20-yard touchdown run, Everett Hayes kick good	0	7
2	14:42	1	62	0:09	Utah State	Deven Thompkins 62-yard touchdown reception from Cooper Legas, Connor Coles kick good	7	7
2	8:40	13	66	5:56	Oregon State	37-yard field goal by Everett Hayes	7	10
2	4:24	11	85	4:16	Utah State	Calvin Tyler Jr. 15-yard touchdown run, Connor Coles kick good	14	10
3	10:05	13	64	4:55	Utah State	25-yard field goal by Connor Coles	17	10
3	3:49	9	74	3:06	Utah State	Brandon Bowling 5-yard touchdown reception from Cooper Legas, Connor Coles kick good	24	10
4	13:35	12	59	5:14	Oregon State	34-yard field goal by Everett Hayes	24	13
"TOP" = time of possession. For other American football terms, see Glossary of American football.							24	13

=== Statistics ===
Statistics	USU	OSU
First downs	26	23
Plays–yards	75–383	66–415
Rushes–yards	44–110	36–152
Passing yards	273	263
Passing: comp–att–int	18–31–2	21–30–1
Time of possession	29:26	30:34

Team	Category	Player	Statistics
Utah State	Passing	Cooper Legas	11/20, 171 yards, 2 TD, INT
Utah State	Rushing	Calvin Tyler Jr.	26 carries, 120 yards, TD
Utah State	Receiving	Deven Thompkins	6 receptions, 115 yards, TD
Oregon State	Passing	Chance Nolan	21/30, 263 yards, INT
Oregon State	Rushing	B. J. Baylor	18 carries, 78 yards
Oregon State	Receiving	Luke Musgrave	3 receptions, 44 yards

== Largest t-shirt cannon ==
During halftime, engineer Mark Rober and Anthony Hartman shot off the world's largest t-shirt cannon.
