= 2021 San Jose State Spartans football team =

American college football season

2021 San Jose State Spartans football
- Conference: Mountain West Conference
- Record: 5–7 (3–5 MW)
- Head coach: Brent Brennan (5th season)
- Offensive coordinator: Kevin McGiven (4th season)
- Offensive scheme: Spread option
- Defensive coordinator: Derrick Odum (5th season)
- Base defense: 3–4
- Home stadium: CEFCU Stadium

Uniform
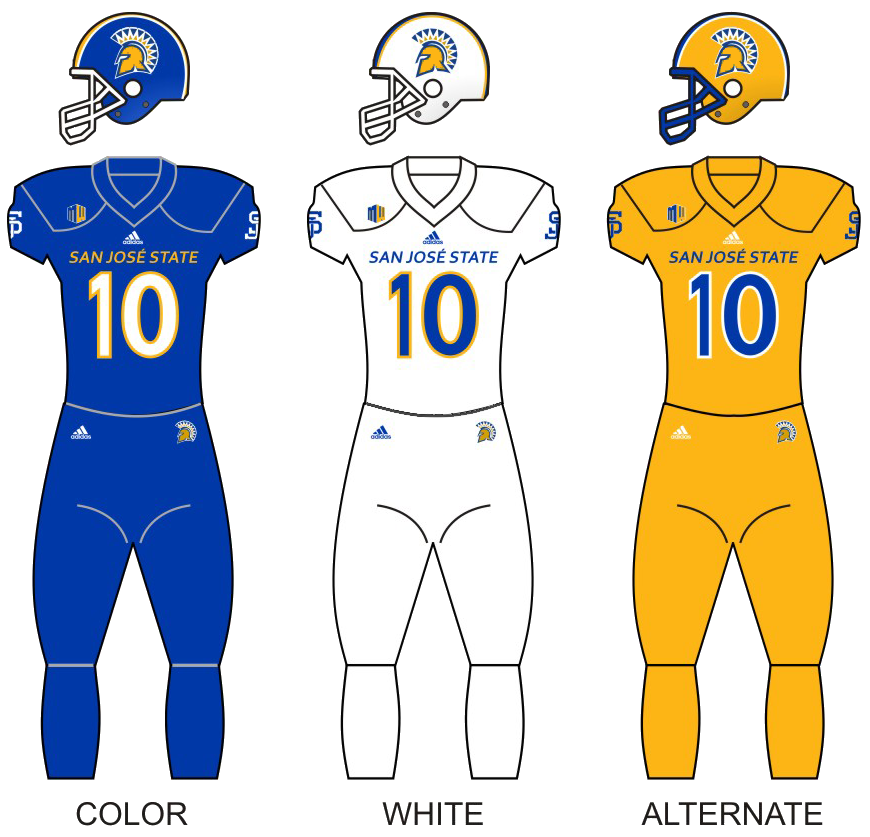

2021 Mountain West Conference football standings
	Conf.			Overall
Team	W		L	W		L
Mountain Division
No. 24 Utah State xy$	6	–	2	11	–	3
Air Force x	6	–	2	10	–	3
Boise State	5	–	3	7	–	5
Wyoming	2	–	6	7	–	6
Colorado State	2	–	6	3	–	9
New Mexico	1	–	7	3	–	9
West Division
No. 25 San Diego State xy	7	–	1	12	–	2
Fresno State	6	–	2	10	–	3
Nevada	5	–	3	8	–	5
Hawaii	3	–	5	6	–	7
San Jose State	3	–	5	5	–	7
UNLV	2	–	6	2	–	10
Championship: Utah State 46, San Diego State 13
$ – Conference champion; x – Division champion/co-champions; y – Championship game participant; Rankings from AP Poll

The 2021 San Jose State Spartans football team represented San José State University in the 2021 NCAA Division I FBS football season. The Spartans were led by fifth–year head coach Brent Brennan and played their home games at CEFCU Stadium. They were members of the West Division of the Mountain West Conference.

Linebacker Kyle Harmon ranked second nationally with 133 total tackles (72 unassisted, 61 assisted) during the 2021 season.

== Schedule ==
Date	Time	Opponent	Site	TV	Result	Attendance
August 28	7:00 p.m.	Southern Utah*	CEFCU Stadium; San Jose, CA	CBSSN	W 45–14	16,204
September 4	2:00 p.m.	at No. 15 USC*	Los Angeles Memorial Coliseum; Los Angeles, CA	P12N	L 7–30	54,398
September 18	9:30 p.m.	at Hawaii	Clarence T. C. Ching Athletics Complex; Honolulu, HI (Dick Tomey Legacy Game)	FS1	W 17–13	0
September 25	11:00 a.m.	at Western Michigan*	Waldo Stadium; Kalamazoo, MI	ESPN+	L 3–23	12,317
October 2	7:30 p.m.	New Mexico State*	CEFCU Stadium; San Jose, CA	NBCSBA	W 37–31	15,803
October 9	12:30 p.m.	at Colorado State	Canvas Stadium; Fort Collins, CO	FS1	L 14–32	34,780
October 15	7:30 p.m.	No. 24 San Diego State^{†}	CEFCU Stadium; San Jose, CA	CBSSN	L 13–19 ^{2OT}	17,177
October 21	8:00 p.m.	at UNLV	Allegiant Stadium; Paradise, NV	CBSSN	W 27–20	19,318
October 30	1:00 p.m.	Wyoming	CEFCU Stadium; San Jose, CA	FS2	W 27–21	13,042
November 6	7:00 p.m.	at Nevada	Mackay Stadium; Reno, NV	FS2	L 24–27	17,770
November 13	7:30 p.m.	Utah State	CEFCU Stadium; San Jose, CA	FS1	L 17–48	15,135
November 25	12:30 p.m.	Fresno State	CEFCU Stadium; San Jose, CA (rivalry)	FS1	L 9–40	15,323
*Non-conference game; ^{†}Homecoming; Rankings from AP Poll (and CFP Rankings, after November 2) - Released prior to game; All times are in Pacific time
