= Logan Bonner =

American football player (born 1997)

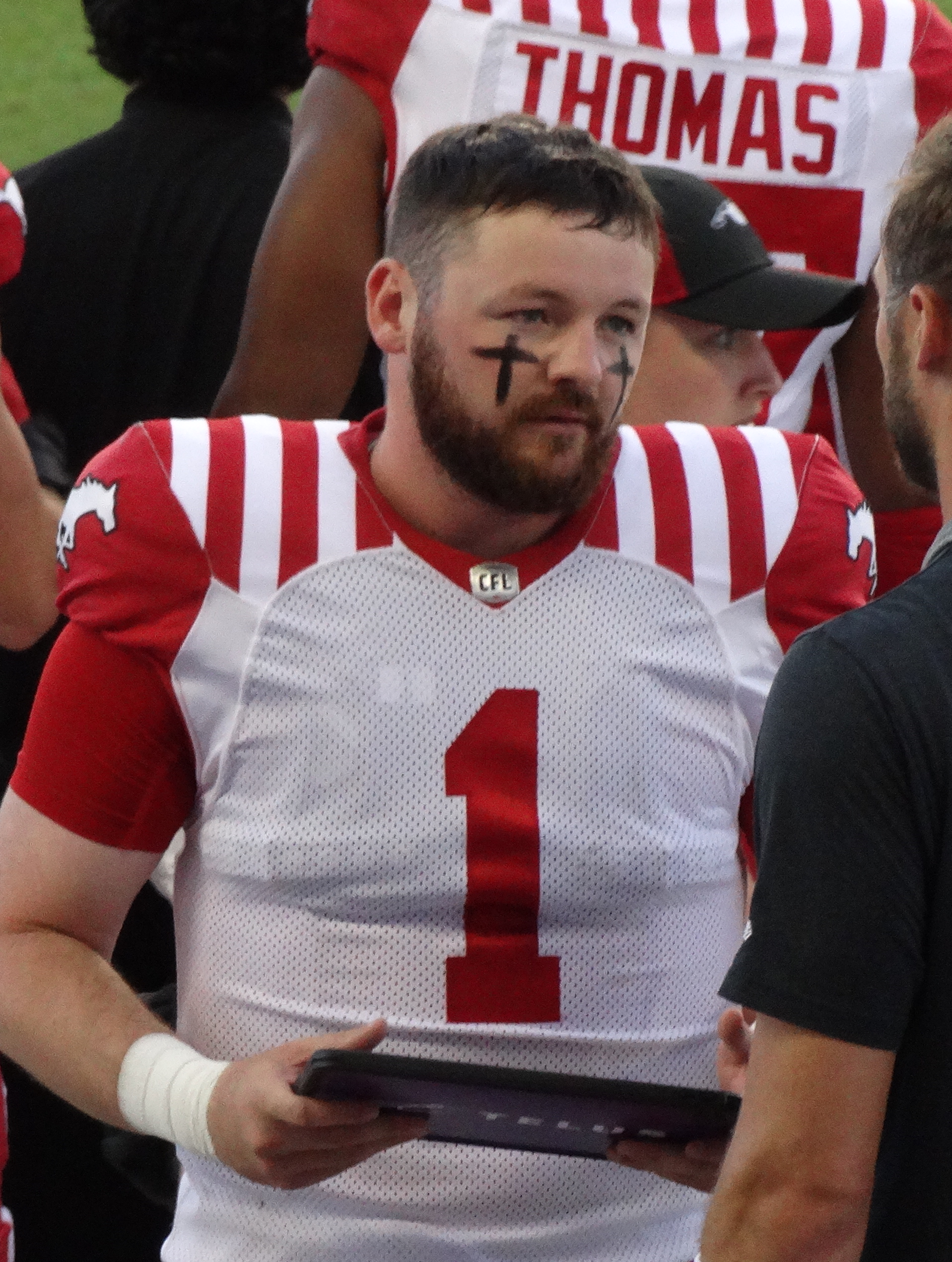
- Bonner with the Calgary Stampeders in 2024

No. 1, 17
- Position: Quarterback

Personal information
- Born: September 24, 1997 (age 29); Dallas, Texas, U.S.
- Listed height: 6 ft 1 in (1.85 m)
- Listed weight: 230 lb (104 kg)

Career information
- High school: Rowlett (Rowlett, Texas)
- College: Arkansas State (2016–2020); Utah State (2021–2022)
- NFL draft: 2023: undrafted

Career history
- Calgary Stampeders (2023–2025)
- Stats at CFL.ca

Logan Bonner (born September 24, 1997) is an American former professional football quarterback. He played in the Canadian Football League (CFL) for the Calgary Stampeders from 2023 to 2025. He played college football for Arkansas State and Utah State.

== Early life and college ==
Bonner grew up in Rowlett, Texas, and attended Rowlett High School.

=== Arkansas State ===
He began his college football career at Arkansas State. After red-shirting in 2016, he played for the Arkansas State football team from 2017 to 2020. He received a bachelor's degree in sports management from Arkansas State.

=== Utah State ===
In 2021, Bonner followed Arkansas State coach Blake Anderson to Utah State, enrolling there as a graduate student. During the 2021 season, he completed 263 of 429 passes for 3,628 yards and 36 touchdowns. His 2021 totals of 3,628 passing yards and 36 touchdowns set new Utah State records.

Bonner returned to Utah State for his sixth season of college football in 2022. In July 2022, he was named to the Maxwell Award watch list. His 2022 season ended at the end of September due to a foot injury sustained against UNLV. He ended the season with 753 passing yards with six touchdowns, eight interceptions, and a 56.8% completion rate.

=== Statistics ===
Year	Team	Games		Passing								Rushing			
Year	Team	GP	Record	Comp	Att	Pct	Yards	Avg	TD	Int	Rate	Att	Yards	Avg	TD
2016	Arkansas State	Did not play													
2017	Arkansas State	4	0–0	9	21	42.9	70	3.3	1	1	77.0	7	11	1.6	0
2018	Arkansas State	5	0–0	15	32	46.9	181	5.7	1	1	98.5	5	33	6.6	0
2019	Arkansas State	4	2–2	91	153	59.5	1,052	6.9	10	1	137.5	20	-7	-0.4	1
2020	Arkansas State	11	4–7	156	262	59.5	1,863	7.1	18	6	137.4	34	25	0.7	0
2021	Utah State	14	11–3	263	429	61.3	3,628	8.5	36	12	154.4	69	66	1.0	0
2022	Utah State	4	1–3	62	110	56.4	753	6.8	6	8	117.3	12	15	1.3	0
Career		42	18−15	596	1,007	59.2	7,547	7.5	72	29	140.0	147	143	1.0	1

== Professional career ==
On May 8, 2023, Bonner signed with the Calgary Stampeders of the Canadian Football League (CFL). He began the 2023 season on the practice roster, but was elevated to the active roster as the third-string quarterback for the team's game against the Winnipeg Blue Bombers on August 19. He dressed in the final nine games of the season, but did not record any statistics.

Upon the signing of Matthew Shiltz to serve as the primary backup, Bonner began the 2024 season as the fourth-string quarterback. However, after Shiltz was moved to the injured list, Bonner began dressing in week 7. He saw his first game action in a blowout loss to the Ottawa Redblacks where he completed four of eight pass attempts for 61 yards. After incumbent starter, Jake Maier, struggled in the Labour Day Classic and the team had a 4–7 record, Bonner was named the starter for the rematch game against the Edmonton Elks on September 7, 2024. He was with the team in training camp in 2025, but was part of the final cuts on June 1, 2025. Following an injury to P. J. Walker, Bonner was re-signed on September 22.

On May 16, 2026, Bonner announced his retirement from professional football.
