= Howard Stearns =

American football coach (born 1955)

Biographical details
- Born: August 28, 1955

Playing career
- 1974–1976: Eastern New Mexico
- Position: Offensive tackle

Coaching career (HC unless noted)
- 1986–1991: Eastern New Mexico (DL)
- 1992–1993: Eastern New Mexico

Head coaching record
- Overall: 6–13–1

Howard Stearns (born August 28, 1955) is an American former college football coach. He served as the head football coach at Eastern New Mexico University in Portales, New Mexico for two seasons, from 1992 to 1993, compiling a record of 6–13–1.

Stearns attended John Jay High School in San Antonio, graduating in 1973. He played football at Eastern New Mexico as an offensive tackle, before graduating in 1978. Stearns returned to his alma mater in 1986 and was defensive line coach for six seasons before succeeding Don Carthel as head coach in 1992. He resigned from his post as head coach in December 1993.

== Head coaching record ==
Year	Team	Overall	Conference	Standing	Bowl/playoffs
Eastern New Mexico Greyhounds (Lone Star Conference) (1992–1993)
1992	Eastern New Mexico	5–5	3–3	T–3rd	
1993	Eastern New Mexico	1–8–1	1–4	T–5th	
Eastern New Mexico:		6–13–1	4–7		
Total:		6–13–1			
