= Terry Wilson (quarterback) =

American gridiron football player (born 1998)

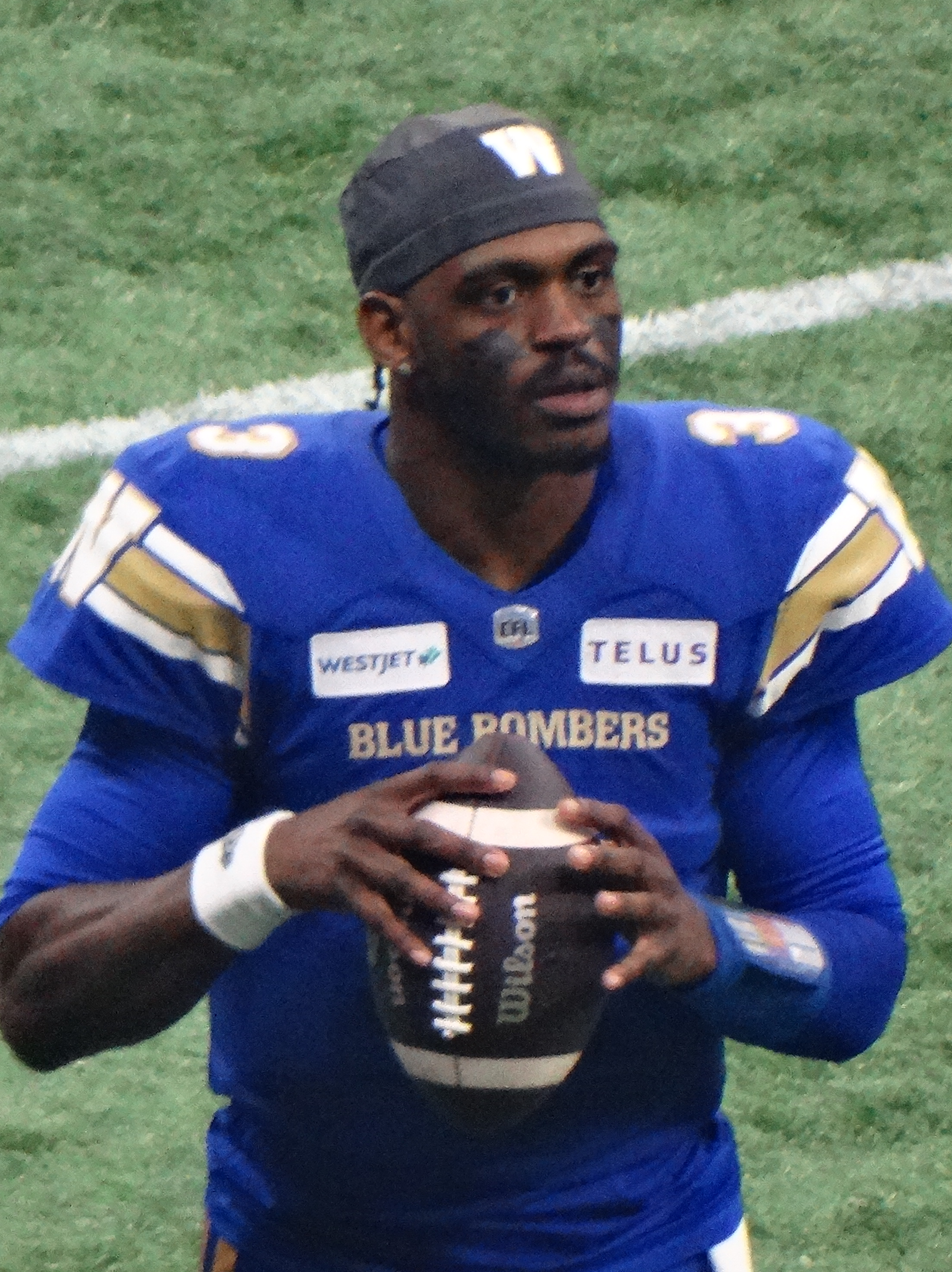
- Wilson with the Winnipeg Blue Bombers in 2024

Montreal Alouettes
- Position: Quarterback
- CFL status: American

Personal information
- Born: January 14, 1998 (age 28); Oklahoma City, Oklahoma, U.S.
- Listed height: 6 ft 3 in (1.91 m)
- Listed weight: 202 lb (92 kg)

Career information
- High school: Del City (Del City, Oklahoma)
- College: Oregon (2016); Garden City CC (2017); Kentucky (2018–2020); New Mexico (2021)
- NFL draft: 2022: undrafted

Career history
- Houston Gamblers (2022–2023); Winnipeg Blue Bombers (2024–2025); Montreal Alouettes (2026–present)

Career USFL statistics
- Games played: 7

Career CFL statistics as of 2026
- Games played: 43
- Completions–Attempts: 12–22
- Completion percentage: 54.5
- Passing yards: 83
- TD–INT: 0–1
- Rushing yards: 150
- Rushing touchdowns: 10
- Stats at CFL.ca

Terry Wilson Jr. (born January 14, 1998) is an American professional football quarterback for the Montreal Alouettes of the Canadian Football League (CFL). He played college football for the Oregon Ducks, Garden City Broncbusters, Kentucky Wildcats and New Mexico Lobos. He played for the Houston Gamblers of the United States Football League (USFL) from 2022 to 2023.

== Early life ==
Wilson was born in Oklahoma City, Oklahoma, and grew up there. He attended Del City High School, and was a two-time honorable mention all-state selection at quarterback. As a junior, Wilson passed for 2,856 yards and 24 touchdowns, helping his team score an average of 14.3 points per-game. As a senior, he threw 281 passes, completing 154 of them, for 2,406 yards and 25 touchdowns. He also rushed for 709 yards and scored 11 touchdowns, being selected to play in the Oklahoma Coaches Association All-State game and in the Semper Fidelis All-American Bowl. He was named All-Midlands Region by The Oklahoman and was ranked as the second-best prospect in the state by Tulsa World and the former.

== College career ==
=== Oregon ===
A four-star recruit, Wilson initially committed to Nebraska, but then changed his mind and instead signed with Oregon. After redshirting his first year, in 2016, he decided to transfer to Garden City Community College, partially because of the departure of coach Scott Frost and because he "sensed the fit wasn't right" with Oregon.

=== Garden City CC ===
Wilson played one season, in 2017, at Garden City, and threw for 2,133 yards and 26 touchdowns while completing 57.6% of his pass attempts. Additionally, he ran for 518 yards and scored five touchdowns, on his way to being named Jayhawk Conference Offense Player of the Year. He placed sixth nationally for junior colleges in passing touchdowns and was first in the conference in efficiency.

=== Kentucky ===
Wilson transferred to Kentucky for his sophomore season, in 2018, and became their starting quarterback in his first year with the team. He ended up starting all 13 games, and led them to their first ten-win season since 1977. He threw 11 touchdowns and completed 180 out of 268 pass attempts, with a 67.2 completion rate. He also placed second on the roster in rushing yards with 547, and became the first Kentucky player in history to have over 1,500 passing yards and over 500 rushing yards in the same year. After the game against the Florida Gators, Wilson was named the Manning Player of the Week. He also earned the Howard Schnellenberger Award for being most valuable player of the Governor's Cup.

In the second game of the 2019 season, Wilson suffered a season-ending torn patellar tendon against the Eastern Michigan Eagles. Before the injury, he had thrown for 360 yards and two touchdowns on 33 completions. He recovered in time for the 2020 season and started all but one game, passing for 1,187 yards and seven touchdowns with four interceptions. He helped them compile a 5–6 record in a season shortened by COVID-19, and also ran for 424 yards and scored five touchdowns.

=== New Mexico ===
After being given an extra year of eligibility due to the COVID-19 pandemic, Wilson decided to transfer to New Mexico for his final season. He ended his time with Kentucky as the only player in team history with over 3,000 passing yards and 1,000 rushing yards. In August 2021, Wilson was named New Mexico's starting quarterback, having won the training camp position battle. He appeared in seven games, six as a starter, before suffering a season-ending elbow injury midway through the year. He had completed 101 passes for 1,058 yards and seven touchdowns before getting injured. Wilson finished his NCAA career with 4,494 passing yards and 27 touchdowns, along with 1,047 rushing yards and 11 scores.

== Professional career ==
Wilson was not selected in the 2022 NFL draft. He later was invited to the Dallas Cowboys rookie minicamp, but was not signed.

=== Houston Gamblers ===
On May 27, 2022, Wilson was signed by the Houston Gamblers of the United States Football League (USFL). He made an appearance in one game during the season. He was released on September 19, 2023.

=== Winnipeg Blue Bombers ===
On November 29, 2023, Wilson signed with the Winnipeg Blue Bombers of the Canadian Football League (CFL). The Blue Bombers placed Wilson on the suspended list on May 22, 2026, and he was subsequently released four days later.

=== Montreal Alouettes ===
On July 6, 2026, it was announced that Wilson had signed with the Montreal Alouettes.

== Career statistics ==
=== Professional ===
Season	Team	League	Games			Passing						Rushing			
Season	Team	League	GP	GS	Record	Comp	Att	Yards	Pct	TD	Int	Att	Yds	Avg	TD
2022	HOU	USFL	1	0	0–0	0	0	0	0.0	0	0	0	0	0.0	0
2023	HOU	USFL	6	1	1–0	11	17	138	64.7	1	0	18	95	5.3	0
2024	WPG	CFL	18	0	0–0	1	1	4	100.0	0	0	18	36	2.0	4
2025	WPG	CFL	18	0	0–0	11	21	79	52.4	0	1	23	78	3.4	1
Career (USFL)			7	1	1–0	11	17	138	64.7	1	0	18	95	5.3	0
Career (CFL)			36	0	0–0	12	22	83	54.5	0	1	41	114	2.8	5

=== College ===
Season	Team	Games			Passing						Rushing			
Season	Team	GP	GS	Record	Comp	Att	Yards	Pct	TD	Int	Att	Yds	Avg	TD
2016	ORE	0	0	—	Redshirted (redshirt)									
2017	GCC	11	11	8–3	194	337	2,113	57.6	26	11	126	518	4.1	5
2018	KEN	13	13	10–3	180	268	1,889	67.2	11	8	135	547	4.0	4
2019	KEN	2	2	2–0	33	52	360	63.5	2	0	17	44	2.6	1
2020	KEN	10	10	5–5	125	200	1,187	62.5	7	4	104	424	4.1	5
2021	NM	6	6	2–4	101	174	1,058	58.0	7	4	52	32	0.6	1
Career (NCAA)		31	31	19–12	439	694	4,494	63.3	27	16	308	1,047	3.4	11
Career (NJCAA)		11	11	8–3	194	337	2,113	57.6	26	11	126	518	4.1	5
