= 2021 First Responder Bowl =

Postseason college football bowl game

2021 Servpro First Responder Bowl
- 12th First Responder Bowl
Air Force Falcons	Louisville Cardinals
(9–3)	(6–6)
MWC	ACC
31	28
Head coach: Troy Calhoun	Head coach: Scott Satterfield
	1	2	3	4	Total
Air Force	7	21	0	3	31
Louisville	0	14	7	7	28
- Date: December 28, 2021
- Season: 2021
- Stadium: Gerald J. Ford Stadium
- Location: Dallas, Texas
- MVP: Haaziq Daniels (QB, Air Force)
- Favorite: Louisville by 1.5
- Referee: James Carter (SEC)
- Attendance: 15,251

United States TV coverage
- Network: ESPN
- Announcers: Chris Cotter (play-by-play), Mark Herzlich (analyst), and Jalyn Johnson (sideline)

The 2021 First Responder Bowl was a college football bowl game played on December 28, 2021, with kickoff at 3:15 p.m. EST (2:15 p.m. local CST) and televised on ESPN. It was the 12th edition of the First Responder Bowl, and was one of the 2021–22 bowl games concluding the 2021 FBS football season. Sponsored by fire and water cleanup and restoration company Servpro, the game was officially known as the Servpro First Responder Bowl.

== Teams ==
While the bowl has tie-ins with the American Athletic Conference (AAC), Atlantic Coast Conference (ACC), and Big 12 Conference, the actual matchup featured teams from the ACC and Mountain West Conference (MWC). This was the first time Air Force and Louisville ever played each other.

== Game summary ==
2021 Servpro First Responder Bowl

Quarter	1	2	3	4	Total
Air Force	7	21	0	3	31
Louisville	0	14	7	7	28

at Gerald J. Ford Stadium • University Park, Texas

- Date: Tuesday, December 28, 2021
- Game time: 2:15 p.m. CST
- Game weather: Sunny • Temperature: 80 °F (27 °C) • Wind: SW 12 mph
- Game attendance: 15,251
- Referee: James Carter
- TV announcers (ESPN): Chris Cotter (play-by-play), Mark Herzlich (analyst), and Jalyn Johnson (sideline)
- Box score

Scoring summary

Quarter	Time	Drive			Team	Scoring information	Score	
Quarter	Time	Plays	Yards	TOP	Team	Scoring information	Air Force	Louisville
1	2:01	10	74	5:28	Air Force	Haaziq Daniels 5-yard touchdown run, Matthew Dapore kick good	7	0
2	14:14	3	73	0:57	Air Force	Brandon Lewis 61-yard touchdown reception from Haaziq Daniels, Matthew Dapore kick good	14	0
2	9:16	11	65	4:58	Louisville	Trevion Cooley 1-yard touchdown run, Brock Travelstead kick good	14	7
2	5:42	6	75	3:34	Air Force	Brandon Lewis 64-yard touchdown reception from Haaziq Daniels, Matthew Dapore kick good	21	7
2	5:30				Louisville	Jawhar Jordan 100-yard kickoff return for touchdown, Brock Travelstead kick good	21	14
2	0:54	10	75	4:36	Air Force	Haaziq Daniels 1-yard touchdown run, Matthew Dapore kick good	28	14
3	0:04	5	51	1:46	Louisville	Tyler Harrell 34-yard touchdown reception from Malik Cunningham, Brock Travelstead kick good	28	21
4	5:28	17	66	9:36	Air Force	26-yard field goal by Matthew Dapore	31	21
4	2:57	6	70	2:31	Louisville	Malik Cunningham 22-yard touchdown run, Brock Travelstead kick good	31	28
"TOP" = time of possession. For other American football terms, see Glossary of American football.							31	28

=== Statistics ===
Statistics	AFA	LOU
First downs	21	21
Plays–yards	65–422	59–402
Rushes–yards	55–170	37–195
Passing yards	252	207
Passing: comp–att–int	9–10–0	13–21–0
Turnovers		
Time of possession	35:36	24:34

Team	Category	Player	Statistics
Air Force	Passing	Haaziq Daniels	9/10, 252 yards, 2 TD
Air Force	Rushing	Brad Roberts	20 carries, 70 yards
Air Force	Receiving	Brandon Lewis	5 receptions, 172 yards, 2 TD
Louisville	Passing	Malik Cunningham	13/21, 207 yards, TD
Louisville	Rushing	Trevion Cooley	18 carries, 92 yards, TD
Louisville	Receiving	Tyler Harrell	4 receptions, 80 yards, TD

== Externals links ==
- Game statistics at statbroadcast.com
