= 2021 Utah State Aggies football team =

American college football season

2021 Utah State Aggies football

Mountain West Champion MW Mountain Division Champion LA Bowl champion

MW Championship Game, W 46–13 vs. San Diego State

LA Bowl, W 24–13 vs. Oregon State
- Conference: Mountain West Conference
- Mountain Division

Ranking
- Coaches: No. 24
- AP: No. 24
- Record: 11–3 (6–2 MW)
- Head coach: Blake Anderson (1st season)
- Offensive coordinator: Anthony Tucker (1st season)
- Offensive scheme: Spread
- Defensive coordinator: Ephraim Banda (1st season)
- Base defense: 4–3
- Home stadium: Maverik Stadium

Uniform
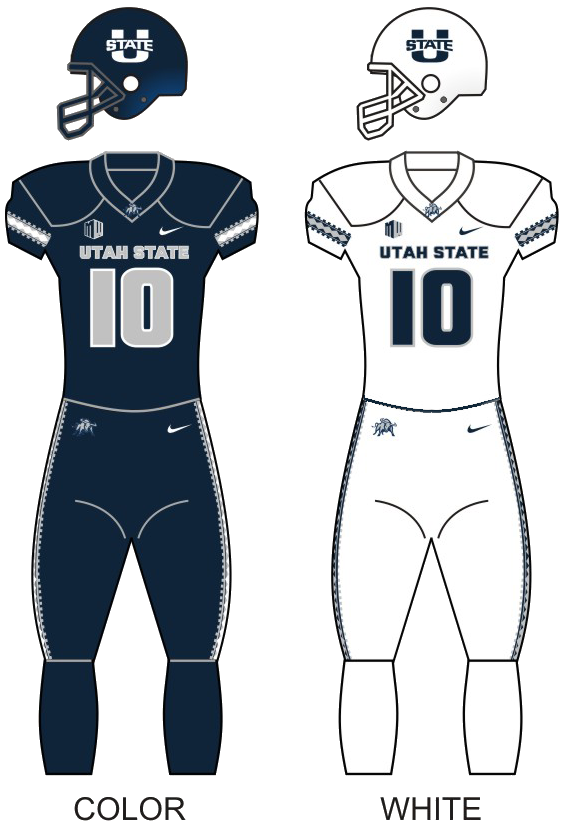

2021 Mountain West Conference football standings
	Conf.			Overall
Team	W		L	W		L
Mountain Division
No. 24 Utah State xy$	6	–	2	11	–	3
Air Force x	6	–	2	10	–	3
Boise State	5	–	3	7	–	5
Wyoming	2	–	6	7	–	6
Colorado State	2	–	6	3	–	9
New Mexico	1	–	7	3	–	9
West Division
No. 25 San Diego State xy	7	–	1	12	–	2
Fresno State	6	–	2	10	–	3
Nevada	5	–	3	8	–	5
Hawaii	3	–	5	6	–	7
San Jose State	3	–	5	5	–	7
UNLV	2	–	6	2	–	10
Championship: Utah State 46, San Diego State 13
$ – Conference champion; x – Division champion/co-champions; y – Championship game participant; Rankings from AP Poll

The 2021 Utah State Aggies football team represented Utah State University in the 2021 NCAA Division I FBS football season. The Aggies were led by first-year head coach Blake Anderson and played their home games at Maverik Stadium. They competed as members of the Mountain Division of the Mountain West Conference. The finished the season 11–3, 6–2 in Mountain West play to win West division to earn a bid in the Mountain West Championship game. They defeated San Diego State in the championship game to win the Mountain West championship. They received an invitation to the LA Bowl where they defeated Oregon State.

== Schedule ==
Date	Time	Opponent	Site	TV	Result	Attendance
September 4	9:00 p.m.	at Washington State*	Martin Stadium; Pullman, WA	P12N	W 26–23	24,944
September 10	7:00 p.m.	No. 9 (FCS) North Dakota*	Maverik Stadium; Logan, UT	CBSSN	W 48–24	18,124
September 18	5:30 p.m.	at Air Force	Falcon Stadium; Colorado Springs, CO	FS2	W 49–45	20,264
September 25	10:00 a.m.	Boise State	Maverik Stadium; Logan, UT	CBS	L 3–27	23,715
October 1	7:00 p.m.	No. 13 BYU*	Maverik Stadium; Logan, UT (rivalry)	CBSSN	L 20–34	25,240
October 16	5:00 p.m.	at UNLV	Allegiant Stadium; Paradise, NV	CBSSN	W 28–24	21,322
October 22	7:30 p.m.	Colorado State	Maverik Stadium; Logan, UT	CBSSN	W 26–24	21,423
October 30	1:00 p.m.	Hawaii	Maverik Stadium; Logan, UT	SPEC PPV	W 51–31	19,219
November 6	2:00 p.m.	at New Mexico State*	Aggie Memorial Stadium; Las Cruces, NM	AggieVision	W 35–13	7,802
November 13	8:30 p.m.	at San Jose State	CEFCU Stadium; San Jose, CA	FS1	W 48–17	15,135
November 20	6:00 p.m.	Wyoming	Maverik Stadium; Logan, UT (rivalry)	CBSSN	L 17–44	20,547
November 26	11:00 a.m.	at New Mexico	University Stadium; Albuquerque, NM	FS1	W 35–10	11,046
December 4	1:00 p.m.	at No. 19 San Diego State	Dignity Health Sports Park; Carson, CA (MW Championship Game)	FOX	W 46–13	13,445
December 18	5:30 p.m.	vs. Oregon State*	SoFi Stadium; Inglewood, CA (LA Bowl)	ABC	W 24–13	29,896
*Non-conference game; Rankings from AP Poll (and CFP Rankings, after November 2) - Released prior to game; All times are in Mountain time
