= 2021–22 NCAA football bowl games =

Series of college football bowl games following the 2021 season

- Season: 2021
- Number of bowls: 39 (Note: 44 total bowl games were scheduled; 43 in FBS (including the College Football Playoff National Championship Game) and 1 in FCS. The Hawaii Bowl, Military Bowl, Fenway Bowl, Arizona Bowl, and Holiday Bowl were subsequently canceled.)
- All-star games: 6
- Bowl games: December 17, 2021 – January 10, 2022 (Note: Dates exclude all-star games.)
- National Championship: 2022 College Football Playoff; National Championship
- Location of Championship: Lucas Oil Stadium; Indianapolis, Indiana
- Champions: Georgia Bulldogs
- Bowl Challenge Cup winner: Mountain West
Bowl record by conference
Conference	Bowls	Record	Number of teams in final AP poll
AAC	4	3–1 (0.750)	2
ACC	6	2–4 (0.333)	4
Big 12	7	5–2 (0.714)	3
Big Ten	10	6–4 (0.600)	4
C–USA	8	3–5 (0.375)	0
MAC	8	3–5 (0.375)	0
Mountain West	6	5–1 (0.833)	2
Pac-12	5	0–5 (0.000)	2
SEC	14	6–8 (0.429)	5
Sun Belt	4	3–1 (0.750)	1
Independent	4	2–2 (0.500)	2

The 2021–22 NCAA football bowl games were a series of college football games scheduled to complete the 2021 NCAA Division I FBS football season. The main games concluded with the 2022 College Football Playoff National Championship played on January 10, 2022, while the all-star portion of the schedule concluded February 19, 2022.

== Schedule ==
The schedule for the 2021–22 bowl games is below. All times are EST (UTC−5). Note that Division II bowls and Division III bowls are not included here. The bowl schedule was released on May 27, 2021.

=== College Football Playoff and National Championship Game ===
The College Football Playoff system is used to determine a national championship of Division I FBS college football. A 13-member committee of experts ranked the top 25 teams in the nation after each of the last seven weeks of the regular season. The top four teams in the final ranking were then seeded in a single-elimination semifinal round, with the winners advancing to the National Championship game.

The semifinal games for the 2021 season were the Cotton Bowl Classic and the Orange Bowl. Both were played December 31, 2021, as part of a yearly rotation of three pairs of two bowls, commonly referred to as the New Year's Six bowl games. The winners advanced to the 2022 College Football Playoff National Championship on January 10, 2022.

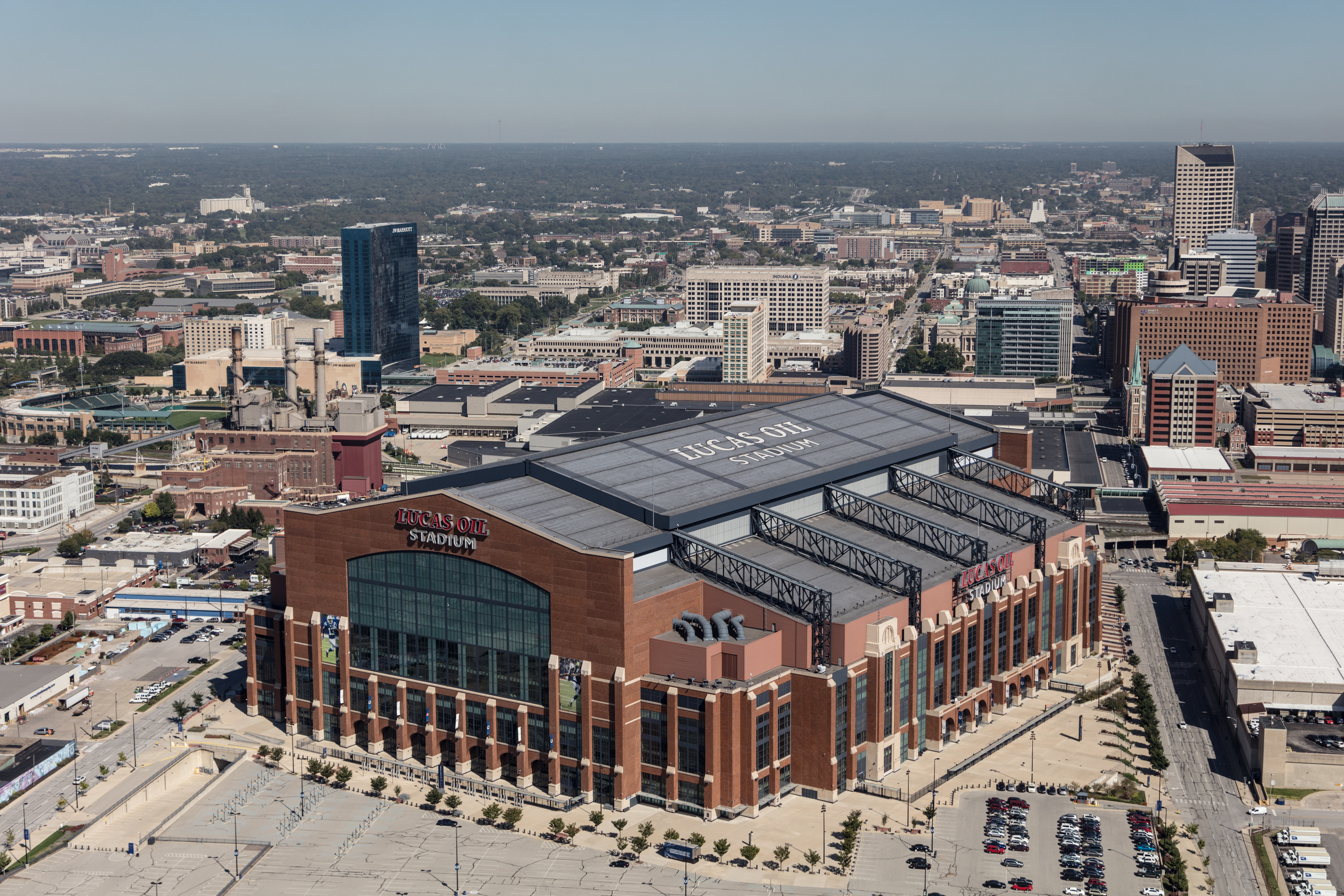
Lucas Oil Stadium, site of the National Championship game

Semifinals
December 31 – Cotton Bowl Classic AT&T Stadium, Arlington
1	Alabama	27
4	Cincinnati	6
December 31 – Orange Bowl Hard Rock Stadium, Miami Gardens
2	Michigan	11
3	Georgia	34

Championship
January 10 – National Championship Lucas Oil Stadium, Indianapolis
1	Alabama	18
3	Georgia	33

Each of the games in the following table was televised by ESPN.

Date	Time (EST)	Game	Site	Teams	Affiliations	Results
Dec. 30	7:00 p.m.	Peach Bowl	Mercedes-Benz Stadium; Atlanta, Georgia	No. 10 Michigan State Spartans (10–2); No. 12 Pittsburgh Panthers (11–2)	Big Ten; ACC	Michigan State 31; Pittsburgh 21
Dec. 31	3:30 p.m.	Cotton Bowl Classic (Playoff Semifinal Game)	AT&T Stadium; Arlington, Texas	No. 1 Alabama Crimson Tide (12–1); No. 4 Cincinnati Bearcats (13–0)	SEC; American	Alabama 27; Cincinnati 6
Dec. 31	7:30 p.m.	Orange Bowl (Playoff Semifinal Game)	Hard Rock Stadium; Miami Gardens, Florida	No. 3 Georgia Bulldogs (12–1); No. 2 Michigan Wolverines (12–1)	SEC; Big Ten	Georgia 34; Michigan 11
Jan. 1	1:00 p.m.	Fiesta Bowl	State Farm Stadium; Glendale, Arizona	No. 9 Oklahoma State Cowboys (11–2); No. 5 Notre Dame Fighting Irish (11–1)	Big 12; Independent	Oklahoma State 37; Notre Dame 35
Jan. 1	5:00 p.m.	Rose Bowl	Rose Bowl; Pasadena, California	No. 6 Ohio State Buckeyes (10–2); No. 11 Utah Utes (10–3)	Big Ten; Pac-12	Ohio State 48; Utah 45
Jan. 1	9:00 p.m.	Sugar Bowl	Caesars Superdome; New Orleans, Louisiana	No. 7 Baylor Bears (11–2); No. 8 Ole Miss Rebels (10–2)	Big 12; SEC	Baylor 21; Ole Miss 7
Jan. 10	8:00 p.m.	College Football Playoff National Championship (Cotton Bowl Winner vs. Orange Bowl Winner)	Lucas Oil Stadium; Indianapolis, Indiana	No. 3 Georgia Bulldogs (13–1); No. 1 Alabama Crimson Tide (13–1)	SEC	Georgia 33; Alabama 18

=== Non CFP bowl games ===
==== Bowl changes ====
Two bowls, which had originally planned to debut during the 2020–21 bowl season but were postponed due to the COVID-19 pandemic, planned to make their debuts during the 2021–22 bowl season; the Fenway Bowl (Boston, Massachusetts) and the LA Bowl (Inglewood, California). The LA Bowl made its debut, while the Fenway Bowl was again canceled due to COVID-19 issues.

The Montgomery Bowl, played in December 2020 as a one-off substitute for the Fenway Bowl, did not return. The San Francisco Bowl (formerly the Redbox Bowl) was canceled for a second straight season when organizers could not come to terms with all parties involved with the game.

On December 2, 2021, the NCAA approved a 42nd bowl game, later named the Frisco Football Classic, in order to accommodate all 84 bowl-eligible teams.

On December 22, Texas A&M withdrew from the Gator Bowl, citing a breakout of positive COVID-19 cases and season-ending injuries limiting them to too few players. Rutgers was subsequently announced as a replacement team.

On December 23, Hawaii withdrew from the Hawaii Bowl, similarly citing season-ending injuries, transfers, and COVID-19 cases within the program, and the game was ultimately cancelled.

On December 26, Boston College withdrew from the Military Bowl and Virginia withdrew from the Fenway Bowl due to COVID-19 cases; both games were canceled.

On December 26, the Miami (FL) Hurricanes announced that they would not be able to play in the Sun Bowl due to COVID-19 issues; organizers stated that they would try to secure a replacement team to face the Washington State Cougars.

On December 27, the Boise State Broncos withdrew from the Arizona Bowl due to COVID-19 issues; organizers stated that they would attempt to secure a replacement team. Later in the day, the Arizona Bowl was canceled, and the bowl's remaining team, the Central Michigan Chippewas, was named as the replacement team for the Sun Bowl.

On December 28, the Holiday Bowl was called off hours before game time, due to COVID-19 issues within the UCLA Bruins program, and officially canceled the next morning, after organizers could not secure a replacement team to face the NC State Wolfpack.

==== Bowl schedule / results ====
In the below table, affiliations for confirmed teams reflect their actual conferences, and rankings are per the final CFP rankings that were released on December 5.

Date	Time (EST)	Game	Site	Television	Teams	Affiliations	Results
Dec. 17	12:00 p.m.	Bahamas Bowl	Thomas Robinson Stadium; Nassau, Bahamas	ESPN	Middle Tennessee Blue Raiders (6–6); Toledo Rockets (7–5)	C–USA; MAC	Middle Tennessee 31; Toledo 24
Dec. 17	6:00 p.m.	Cure Bowl	Exploria Stadium; Orlando, Florida	ESPN2	Coastal Carolina Chanticleers (10–2); Northern Illinois Huskies (9–4)	Sun Belt; MAC	Coastal Carolina 47; Northern Illinois 41
Dec. 18	11:00 a.m.	Boca Raton Bowl	FAU Stadium; Boca Raton, Florida	ESPN	Western Kentucky Hilltoppers (8–5); Appalachian State Mountaineers (10–3)	C–USA; Sun Belt	Western Kentucky 59; Appalachian State 38
Dec. 18	2:15 p.m.	New Mexico Bowl	University Stadium; Albuquerque, New Mexico	ESPN	Fresno State Bulldogs (9–3); UTEP Miners (7–5)	MWC; C–USA	Fresno State 31; UTEP 24
Dec. 18	3:30 p.m.	Independence Bowl	Independence Stadium; Shreveport, Louisiana	ABC	UAB Blazers (8–4); No. 13 BYU Cougars (10–2)	C–USA; Independent	UAB 31; BYU 28
Dec. 18	5:45 p.m.	LendingTree Bowl	Hancock Whitney Stadium; Mobile, Alabama	ESPN	Liberty Flames (7–5); Eastern Michigan Eagles (7–5)	Independent; MAC	Liberty 56; Eastern Michigan 20
Dec. 18	7:30 p.m.	LA Bowl	SoFi Stadium; Inglewood, California	ABC	Utah State Aggies (10–3); Oregon State Beavers (7–5)	MWC; Pac-12	Utah State 24; Oregon State 13
Dec. 18	9:15 p.m.	New Orleans Bowl	Caesars Superdome; New Orleans, Louisiana	ESPN	No. 23 Louisiana Ragin' Cajuns (12–1); Marshall Thundering Herd (7–5)	Sun Belt; C–USA	Louisiana 36; Marshall 21
Dec. 20	2:30 p.m.	Myrtle Beach Bowl	Brooks Stadium; Conway, South Carolina	ESPN	Tulsa Golden Hurricane (6–6); Old Dominion Monarchs (6–6)	American; C–USA	Tulsa 30; Old Dominion 17
Dec. 21	3:30 p.m.	Famous Idaho Potato Bowl	Albertsons Stadium; Boise, Idaho	ESPN	Wyoming Cowboys (6–6); Kent State Golden Flashes (7–6)	MWC; MAC	Wyoming 52; Kent State 38
Dec. 21	7:30 p.m.	Frisco Bowl	Toyota Stadium; Frisco, Texas	ESPN	No. 24 San Diego State Aztecs (11–2); UTSA Roadrunners (12–1)	MWC; C–USA	San Diego State 38; UTSA 24
Dec. 22	8:00 p.m.	Armed Forces Bowl	Amon G. Carter Stadium; Fort Worth, Texas	ESPN	Army Black Knights (8–4); Missouri Tigers (6–6)	Independent; SEC	Army 24; Missouri 22
Dec. 23	3:30 p.m.	Frisco Football Classic	Toyota Stadium; Frisco, Texas	ESPN	Miami (OH) RedHawks (6–6); North Texas Mean Green (6–6)	MAC; C–USA	Miami (OH) 27; North Texas 14
Dec. 23	7:00 p.m.	Gasparilla Bowl	Raymond James Stadium; Tampa, Florida	ESPN	UCF Knights (8–4); Florida Gators (6–6)	American; SEC	UCF 29; Florida 17
Dec. 24	8:00 p.m.	Hawaii Bowl	Clarence T. C. Ching Athletics Complex; Honolulu, Hawaii	ESPN	Memphis Tigers (6–6); Hawaii Rainbow Warriors (6–7)	American; MWC	Canceled
Dec. 25	2:30 p.m.	Camellia Bowl	Cramton Bowl; Montgomery, Alabama	ESPN	Georgia State Panthers (7–5); Ball State Cardinals (6–6)	Sun Belt; MAC	Georgia State 51; Ball State 20
Dec. 27	11:00 a.m.	Quick Lane Bowl	Ford Field; Detroit, Michigan	ESPN	Western Michigan Broncos (7–5); Nevada Wolf Pack (8–4)	MAC; MWC	Western Michigan 52; Nevada 24
Dec. 27	2:30 p.m.	Military Bowl	Navy–Marine Corps Memorial Stadium; Annapolis, Maryland	ESPN	Boston College Eagles (6–6); East Carolina Pirates (7–5)	ACC; American	Canceled
Dec. 28	12:00 p.m.	Birmingham Bowl	Protective Stadium; Birmingham, Alabama	ESPN	No. 20 Houston Cougars (11–2); Auburn Tigers (6–6)	American; SEC	Houston 17; Auburn 13
Dec. 28	3:15 p.m.	First Responder Bowl	Gerald J. Ford Stadium; University Park, Texas	ESPN	Air Force Falcons (9–3); Louisville Cardinals (6–6)	MWC; ACC	Air Force 31; Louisville 28
Dec. 28	6:45 p.m.	Liberty Bowl	Liberty Bowl Memorial Stadium; Memphis, Tennessee	ESPN	Texas Tech Red Raiders (6–6); Mississippi State Bulldogs (7–5)	Big 12; SEC	Texas Tech 34; Mississippi State 7
Dec. 28	8:00 p.m.	Holiday Bowl	Petco Park; San Diego, California	Fox	UCLA Bruins (8–4); No. 18 NC State Wolfpack (9–3)	Pac-12; ACC	Canceled
Dec. 28	10:15 p.m.	Guaranteed Rate Bowl	Chase Field; Phoenix, Arizona	ESPN	Minnesota Golden Gophers (8–4); West Virginia Mountaineers (6–6)	Big Ten; Big 12	Minnesota 18; West Virginia 6
Dec. 29	11:00 a.m.	Fenway Bowl	Fenway Park; Boston, Massachusetts	ESPN	SMU Mustangs (8–4); Virginia Cavaliers (6–6)	American; ACC	Canceled
Dec. 29	2:15 p.m.	Pinstripe Bowl	Yankee Stadium; The Bronx, New York	ESPN	Maryland Terrapins (6–6); Virginia Tech Hokies (6–6)	Big Ten; ACC	Maryland 54; Virginia Tech 10
Dec. 29	5:45 p.m.	Cheez-It Bowl	Camping World Stadium; Orlando, Florida	ESPN	No. 19 Clemson Tigers (9–3); Iowa State Cyclones (7–5)	ACC; Big 12	Clemson 20; Iowa State 13
Dec. 29	9:15 p.m.	Alamo Bowl	Alamodome; San Antonio, Texas	ESPN	No. 16 Oklahoma Sooners (10–2); No. 14 Oregon Ducks (10–3)	Big 12; Pac-12	Oklahoma 47; Oregon 32
Dec. 30	11:30 a.m.	Duke's Mayo Bowl	Bank of America Stadium; Charlotte, North Carolina	ESPN	South Carolina Gamecocks (6–6); North Carolina Tar Heels (6–6)	SEC; ACC	South Carolina 38; North Carolina 21
Dec. 30	3:00 p.m.	Music City Bowl	Nissan Stadium; Nashville, Tennessee	ESPN	Purdue Boilermakers (8–4); Tennessee Volunteers (7–5)	Big Ten; SEC	Purdue 48; Tennessee 45
Dec. 30	10:30 p.m.	Las Vegas Bowl	Allegiant Stadium; Paradise, Nevada	ESPN	Wisconsin Badgers (8–4); Arizona State Sun Devils (8–4)	Big Ten; Pac-12	Wisconsin 20; Arizona State 13
Dec. 31	11:00 a.m.	Gator Bowl	TIAA Bank Field; Jacksonville, Florida	ESPN	No. 17 Wake Forest Demon Deacons (10–3); Rutgers Scarlet Knights (5−7) (Note: Rutgers replaced Texas A&M in the Gator Bowl.)	ACC; Big Ten	Wake Forest 38; Rutgers 10
Dec. 31	12:00 p.m.	Sun Bowl	Sun Bowl; El Paso, Texas	CBS	Central Michigan Chippewas (8–4) (Note: Central Michigan replaced Miami (FL) in the Sun Bowl.); Washington State Cougars (7–5)	MAC; Pac-12	Central Michigan 24; Washington State 21
Dec. 31	2:00 p.m.	Arizona Bowl	Arizona Stadium; Tucson, Arizona	Barstool; Sports (Note: The Arizona Bowl was to be broadcast via Barstool Sports' website, app, and social media platforms.)	Boise State Broncos (7–5); Central Michigan Chippewas (8–4)	MWC; MAC	Canceled
Jan. 1	12:00 p.m.	Outback Bowl	Raymond James Stadium; Tampa, Florida	ESPN2	No. 21 Arkansas Razorbacks (8–4); Penn State Nittany Lions (7–5)	SEC; Big Ten	Arkansas 24; Penn State 10
Jan. 1	1:00 p.m.	Citrus Bowl	Camping World Stadium; Orlando, Florida	ABC	No. 22 Kentucky Wildcats (9–3); No. 15 Iowa Hawkeyes (10–3)	SEC; Big Ten	Kentucky 20; Iowa 17
Jan. 4	9:00 p.m.	Texas Bowl	NRG Stadium; Houston, Texas	ESPN	Kansas State Wildcats (7–5); LSU Tigers (6–6)	Big 12; SEC	Kansas State 42; LSU 20

=== FCS bowl game ===
The Football Championship Subdivision (FCS) has one bowl game. The FCS also has a postseason bracket tournament that culminates in the 2022 NCAA Division I Football Championship Game.

Date	Time (EST)	Game	Site	Television	Participants	Affiliations	Results	References
Dec. 18	12:00 p.m.	Celebration Bowl	Mercedes-Benz Stadium; Atlanta, Georgia	ABC	South Carolina State Bulldogs (6–5); Jackson State Tigers (11–1)	MEAC; SWAC	South Carolina State 31; Jackson State 10	

=== All-star games ===
Each of these games features college seniors, or players whose college football eligibility is ending, who are individually invited by game organizers. These games are scheduled to follow the team-competitive bowls, to allow players selected from bowl teams to participate. The all-star games may include some players from non-FBS programs.

A new all-star game, the HBCU Legacy Bowl, was announced in March 2021, and concluded the overall college football post-season on February 19, 2022.

Date	Time (EST)	Game	Site	Television	Participants	Results	Ref.
Jan. 15	12:00 p.m.	Hula Bowl	Bounce House; Orlando, Florida	CBS Sports Network	Team Kai; Team Aina	Kai 21; Aina 20	
Jan. 15	4:00 p.m.	Tropical Bowl	Camping World Stadium; Orlando, Florida	Varsity Sports Network	American Team; National Team	American 24; National 14	
Jan. 29	6:00 p.m.	NFLPA Collegiate Bowl	Rose Bowl; Pasadena, California	NFL Network	National Team; American Team	National 25; American 24	
Feb. 3	8:30 p.m.	East–West Shrine Bowl	Allegiant Stadium; Paradise, Nevada	NFL Network	West Team; East Team	West 25; East 24	
Feb. 5	2:30 p.m.	Senior Bowl	Hancock Whitney Stadium; Mobile, Alabama	NFL Network	National Team; American Team	National 20; American 10	
Feb. 19	4:00 p.m.	HBCU Legacy Bowl	Yulman Stadium; New Orleans, Louisiana	NFL Network	Team Gaither; Team Robinson	Gaither 22; Robinson 6	

The HBCU Legacy Bowl features players from historically black colleges and universities (HBCU). Most HBCU football programs compete in the Mid-Eastern Athletic Conference (MEAC) or the Southwestern Athletic Conference (SWAC), which are part of FCS.

== Team selections ==
=== CFP top 25 standings and bowl games ===
On December 5, 2021, the College Football Playoff (CFP) selection committee announced its final team rankings for the year. This was the eighth year of the CFP era. Cincinnati became the first team from the Group of Five conferences to reach the playoffs. Michigan became the first team to make the playoffs after starting the season unranked in the AP Poll.

Rank	Team	W–L	Conference and standing	Bowl game
1	Alabama Crimson Tide	12–1	SEC champions	Cotton Bowl (CFP semifinal)
2	Michigan Wolverines	12–1	Big Ten champions	Orange Bowl (CFP semifinal)
3	Georgia Bulldogs	12–1	SEC East Division champions	Orange Bowl (CFP semifinal)
4	Cincinnati Bearcats	13–0	AAC champions	Cotton Bowl (CFP semifinal)
5	Notre Dame Fighting Irish	11–1	Independent	Fiesta Bowl (NY6)
6	Ohio State Buckeyes	10–2	Big Ten East Division co-champions	Rose Bowl (NY6)
7	Baylor Bears	11–2	Big 12 champions	Sugar Bowl (NY6)
8	Ole Miss Rebels	10–2	SEC West Division second place	Sugar Bowl (NY6)
9	Oklahoma State Cowboys	11–2	Big 12 first place	Fiesta Bowl (NY6)
10	Michigan State Spartans	10–2	Big Ten East Division third place	Peach Bowl (NY6)
11	Utah Utes	10–3	Pac-12 champions	Rose Bowl (NY6)
12	Pittsburgh Panthers	11–2	ACC champions	Peach Bowl (NY6)
13	BYU Cougars	10–2	Independent	Independence Bowl
14	Oregon Ducks	10–3	Pac-12 North Division champions	Alamo Bowl
15	Iowa Hawkeyes	10–3	Big Ten West Division champions	Citrus Bowl
16	Oklahoma Sooners	10–2	Big 12 second place (tie)	Alamo Bowl
17	Wake Forest Demon Deacons	10–3	ACC Atlantic Division champions	Gator Bowl
18	NC State Wolfpack	9–3	ACC Atlantic Division second place (tie)	~~Holiday Bowl~~ canceled
19	Clemson Tigers	9–3	ACC Atlantic Division second place (tie)	Cheez-It Bowl
20	Houston Cougars	11–2	AAC first place (tie)	Birmingham Bowl
21	Arkansas Razorbacks	8–4	SEC West Division third place (tie)	Outback Bowl
22	Kentucky Wildcats	9–3	SEC East Division second place	Citrus Bowl
23	Louisiana Ragin' Cajuns	12–1	Sun Belt champions	New Orleans Bowl
24	San Diego State Aztecs	11–2	Mountain West West Division champions	Frisco Bowl
25	Texas A&M Aggies	8–4	SEC West Division third place (tie)	~~Gator Bowl~~ withdrew

=== Conference champions' bowl games ===
Ranks are per the final CFP rankings, released on December 5, with win–loss records at that time. One bowl will feature a matchup of conference champions – the Cotton Bowl. Champions of the Power Five conferences were assured of a spot in a New Year's Six bowl game.

Conference	Champion	W–L	Rank	Bowl game
AAC	Cincinnati Bearcats	13–0	4	Cotton Bowl (semifinal)
ACC	Pittsburgh Panthers	11–2	12	Peach Bowl (NY6)
Big 12	Baylor Bears	11–2	7	Sugar Bowl (NY6)
Big Ten	Michigan Wolverines	12–1	2	Orange Bowl (semifinal)
C-USA	UTSA Roadrunners	12–1	–	Frisco Bowl
MAC	Northern Illinois Huskies	9–4	–	Cure Bowl
Mountain West	Utah State Aggies	10–3	–	LA Bowl
Pac-12	Utah Utes	10–3	11	Rose Bowl (NY6)
SEC	Alabama Crimson Tide	12–1	1	Cotton Bowl (semifinal)
Sun Belt	Louisiana Ragin' Cajuns	12–1	23	New Orleans Bowl

=== Bowl-eligible teams ===
Generally, a team must have at least six wins to be considered bowl eligible, with at least five of those wins being against FBS opponents. The College Football Playoff semi-final games are determined based on the top four seeds in the playoff committee's final rankings. The remainder of the bowl eligible teams are selected by each respective bowl based on conference tie-ins, order of selection, match-up considerations, and other factors.

- ACC (10): Boston College, Clemson, Louisville, Miami (FL), NC State, North Carolina, Pittsburgh, Virginia, Virginia Tech, Wake Forest
- American (7): Cincinnati, East Carolina, Houston, Memphis, SMU, Tulsa, UCF
- Big Ten (9): Iowa, Maryland, Michigan, Michigan State, Minnesota, Ohio State, Penn State, Purdue, Wisconsin
- Big 12 (7): Baylor, Iowa State, Kansas State, Oklahoma, Oklahoma State, Texas Tech, West Virginia
- C-USA (8): Marshall, Middle Tennessee, North Texas, Old Dominion, UAB, UTEP, UTSA, Western Kentucky
- MAC (8): Ball State, Central Michigan, Eastern Michigan, Kent State, Miami (OH), Northern Illinois, Toledo, Western Michigan
- Mountain West (8): Air Force, Boise State, Fresno State, Hawaii, Nevada, San Diego State, Utah State, Wyoming
- Pac-12 (6): Arizona State, Oregon, Oregon State, UCLA, Utah, Washington State
- SEC (13): Alabama, Arkansas, Auburn, Florida, Georgia, Kentucky, LSU, Mississippi State, Missouri, Ole Miss, South Carolina, Tennessee, Texas A&M
- Sun Belt (4): Appalachian State, Coastal Carolina, Georgia State, Louisiana
- Independent (4): Army, BYU, Liberty, Notre Dame

Number of bowl berths available: 84
Number of bowl-eligible teams: 84

=== Bowl-ineligible teams ===
- ACC (4): Duke, Florida State, Georgia Tech, Syracuse
- American (4): Navy, South Florida, Temple, Tulane
- Big Ten (5): Illinois, Indiana, Nebraska, Northwestern, Rutgers*
- Big 12 (3): Kansas, TCU, Texas
- C-USA (6): Charlotte, FIU, Florida Atlantic, Louisiana Tech, Rice, Southern Miss
- MAC (4): Akron, Bowling Green, Buffalo, Ohio
- Mountain West (4): Colorado State, New Mexico, San Jose State, UNLV
- Pac-12 (6): Arizona, California, Colorado, Stanford, USC, Washington
- SEC (1): Vanderbilt
- Sun Belt (6): Arkansas State, Georgia Southern, Louisiana–Monroe, South Alabama, Texas State, Troy
- Independent (3): New Mexico State, UConn, UMass

Number of bowl-ineligible teams: 46

* Rutgers had the highest Academic Progress Rate (APR) of five-win teams. The NCAA announced on December 23 that Rutgers was the first eligible team, under APR regulations, to replace Texas A&M in the Gator Bowl. Rutgers accepted the bid.

== Venues ==
A total of thirty-seven venues were utilized, with seven of them in particular for the CFP National Championship and New Year's Six (NY6). The number of venues increased from twenty, primarily due to the relaxation of the COVID-19 pandemic. Prior to the COVID-19 pandemic, the number of venues for bowl games typically was around forty. Prestige and capacity of venues usually increases as the schedule progresses towards to NY6 bowls and the national championship, in large part due to scheduling Top 25 teams late into the bowl games' time frame, while bowl games before Christmas Day typically involve schools in Group of Five conferences. Televising at the venues of bowl games is largely run by ESPN and joint networks (ABC & ESPN2), with only three bowl games run by a non-affiliated network (Holiday Bowl on Fox, Sun Bowl on CBS and Arizona Bowl on Barstool Sports). With the exception of the Bahamas Bowl in The Bahamas, all bowls were played within the United States.

A map of all hosts of bowl games and their locations in the United States and The Bahamas.
Venues with a number and an x host multiple bowl games.

=== CFP bowls ===
The College Football Playoff committee elected to continue with the six venues for this postseason—including two as the semifinals for the 2022 College Football Playoff National Championship—as outlined below:

- AT&T Stadium in Arlington: Venue for the 2021 Cotton Bowl Classic that featured one of the semi-final pairings.
- State Farm Stadium in Glendale: Venue for the 2022 Fiesta Bowl that featured two of the four highest non-Top 4 and non-NY6 bid conference affiliated.
- Mercedes-Benz Stadium in Atlanta: Venue for the 2021 Peach Bowl that featured two of the four highest non-Top 4 and non-NY6 bid conference affiliated.
- Hard Rock Stadium in Miami Gardens: Venue for the 2021 Orange Bowl that featured one of the semi-final pairings.
- Rose Bowl in Pasadena: Venue for the 2022 Rose Bowl that featured the highest non-top 4 conference finishers from the Big Ten and Pac-12.
- Caesars Superdome in New Orleans: Venue for the 2022 Sugar Bowl that featured the highest non-top 4 conference finishers from the SEC and Big 12.

The National Championship was played at Lucas Oil Stadium in Indianapolis, marking the first time that a state in the U.S. midwest hosted the national championship game in the CFP era.

Glendale (Phoenix area)	Atlanta	New Orleans
State Farm Stadium	Mercedes-Benz Stadium	Caesars Superdome
Capacity: 78,600	Capacity: 75,000	Capacity: 76,468
Exterior of the stadium, 2006	Near completion in August 2017	The Superdome on July 26, 2021, between removal of Mercedes-Benz branding and installation of Caesars branding.
Pasadena (Los Angeles area)	Venues of the 2021 New Year's Six Bowls Source: College Football Playoff	
Rose Bowl	Venues of the 2021 New Year's Six Bowls Source: College Football Playoff	
Capacity: 92,542	Venues of the 2021 New Year's Six Bowls Source: College Football Playoff	
Aerial view from south in 2018	Venues of the 2021 New Year's Six Bowls Source: College Football Playoff	
Arlington (Dallas/Fort Worth area)	Indianapolis^{NC}	Miami Gardens (Miami area)
AT&T Stadium	Lucas Oil Stadium	Hard Rock Stadium
Capacity: 105,000	Capacity: 70,000	Capacity: 64,767
Exterior, June 2020	Aerial photograph of Lucas Oil Stadium (2016).	Exterior view, January 2020

== Television ratings ==
All times Eastern. CFP Rankings.

=== Non-CFP bowl games ===
Rank	Date	Matchup				Network	Viewers (millions)	TV rating	Game	Location
1	January 1, 2022, 1:00 p.m.	No. 15 Iowa	17	No. 22 Kentucky	20	ABC	6.5	3.5	Citrus Bowl	Camping World Stadium, Orlando FL
2	December 30, 2021, 3:00 p.m.	Tennessee	45	Purdue	48	ABC	5.6	3.1	Music City Bowl	Nissan Stadium, Nashville, TN
3	December 29, 2021, 5:45 p.m.	No. 19 Clemson	20	Iowa State	13	ABC	4.9	2.8	Cheez-It Bowl	Camping World Stadium, Orlando FL
4	December 29, 2021, 9:15 p.m.	No. 14 Oregon	32	No. 16 Oklahoma	47	ABC	4.7	2.7	Alamo Bowl	Alamodome, San Antonio, TX
5	January 1, 2022, 12:00 p.m.	Penn State	10	No. 21 Arkansas	24	ESPN2	3.9	2.2	Outback Bowl	Raymond James Stadium, Tampa, FL
6	December 28, 2021, 6:45 p.m	Mississippi State	7	Texas Tech	34	ESPN	3.9	2.3	Liberty Bowl	Liberty Bowl Memorial Stadium, Memphis, TN
7	December 30, 2021, 10:30 p.m.	Wisconsin	20	Arizona St.	13	ESPN	3.6	1.8	Las Vegas Bowl	Allegiant Stadium, Las Vegas, NV
8	December 31, 2021, 11:00 a.m.	No. 17 Wake Forest	38	Rutgers	10	ESPN	3.5	2.1	Gator Bowl	TIAA Bank Field, Jacksonville, FL
9	December 18, 2021, 3:30 p.m.	UAB	31	No. 13 BYU	28	ABC	3.2	1.9	Independence Bowl	Independence Stadium, Shreveport, LA
10	December 23, 2021, 7:00 p.m.	UCF	29	Florida	17	ESPN	3.2	1.8	Gasparilla Bowl	Raymond James Stadium, Tampa, FL

=== New Year Six and College Football Playoff semifinal games ===
All times Eastern. Rankings are from the CFP Rankings.

Rank	Date	Time	Matchup				Network	Viewers (millions)	TV ratings	Game	Location
1	January 10, 2022	8:00 p.m.	No. 3 Georgia	33	No. 1 Alabama	18	ESPN	22.6	12.1	National Championship	Lucas Oil Stadium, Indianapolis, IN
2	December 31, 2021	7:30 p.m.	No. 3 Georgia	34	No. 2 Michigan	11	ESPN	17.2	8.1	Orange Bowl (semifinal)	Hard Rock Stadium, Miami Gardens, FL
3	December 31, 2021	3:30 p.m.	No. 4 Cincinnati	6	No. 1 Alabama	27	ESPN	16.6	8.6	Cotton Bowl (semifinal)	AT&T Stadium, Arlington, TX
4	January 1, 2022	5:00 pm	No. 11 Utah	45	No. 6 Ohio State	48	ESPN	16.6	8.2	Rose Bowl	Rose Bowl, Pasadena, CA
5	January 1, 2022	8:45 p.m.	No. 8 Ole Miss	7	No. 7 Baylor	21	ESPN	9.8	5.1	Sugar Bowl	Caesars Superdome, New Orleans, LA
6	January 1, 2022	1:00 pm	No. 9 Oklahoma State	37	No. 5 Notre Dame	35	ESPN	8.0	4.2	Fiesta Bowl	State Farm Stadium, Glendale, AZ
7	December 30, 2021	7:00 pm	No. 12 Pittsburgh	21	No. 10 Michigan State	31	ESPN	7.6	4.0	Peach Bowl	Mercedes-Benz Stadium, Atlanta, GA
