= Bowl eligibility =

Criteria for bowl games participation

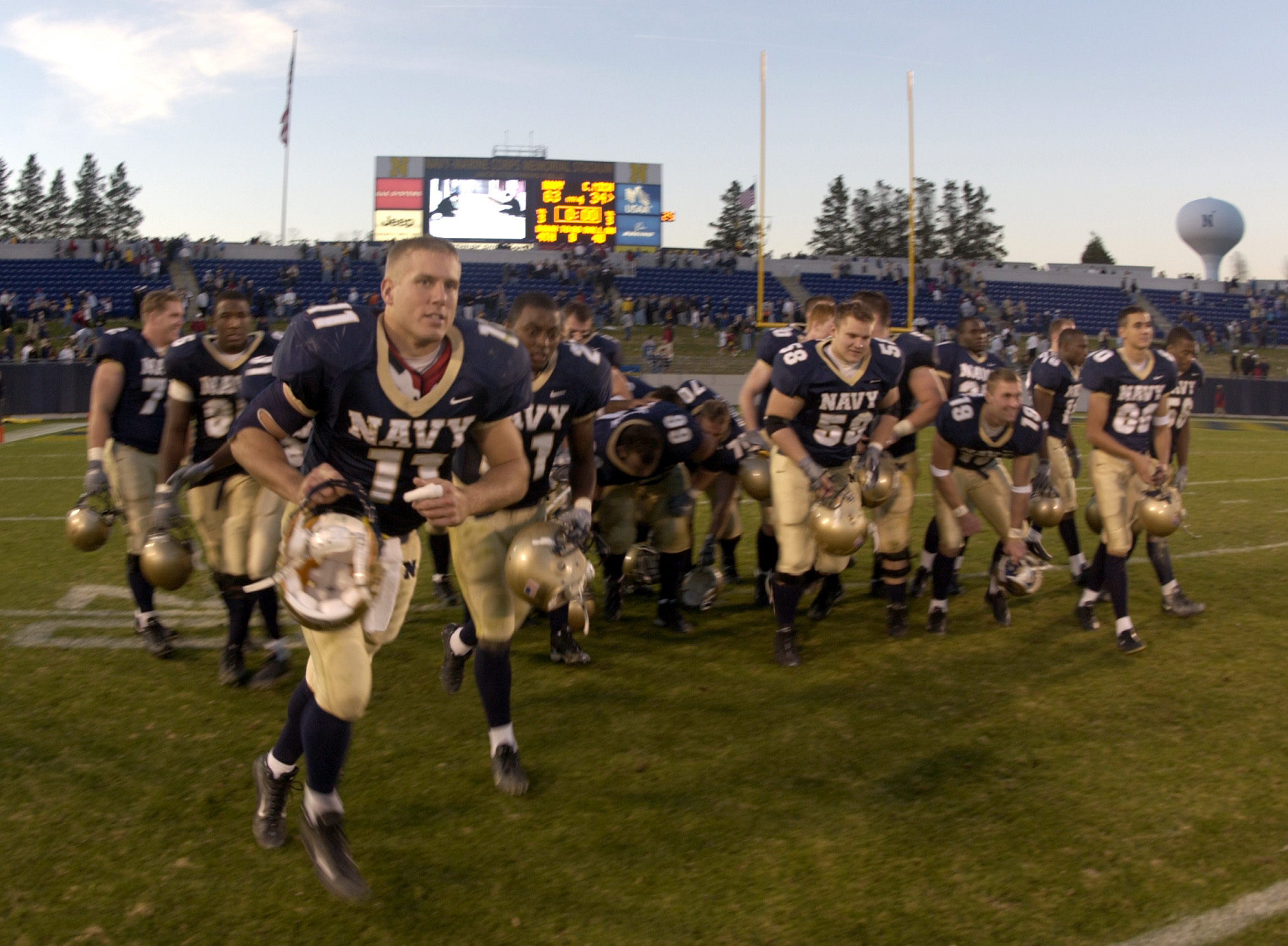
The 2003 Navy Midshipmen football team leaving the field after their seventh win of the season, assuring them bowl eligibility.

Bowl eligibility in college football at the NCAA Division I Football Bowl Subdivision (FBS) level is the standard through which teams become available for selection to participate in postseason bowl games. When a team achieves this state, it is described as "bowl-eligible".

For nearly a century, bowl games were the purview of only the very best teams, but a steady proliferation of new bowl games required 70 participating teams by the 2010–11 bowl season, then 80 participating teams by the 2015–16 bowl season. As a result, the NCAA has steadily reduced the criteria for bowl eligibility, formally allowing teams with a non-winning (6–6) record in 2010, further reducing to allow teams with outright losing records (5–7) to be invited by 2012 if necessary to fill the bowls. For the 2016–17 bowl season, 25% of the bowl participants (20 teams) did not have a winning record.

Current regulations have also adjusted the criteria to allow a team to include one win against teams at the lower FCS level.

Teams that are bowl-eligible will usually either play in one of the bowl games that its conference is affiliated with based on conference tie-ins or the team will be chosen from the pool of remaining bowl-eligible teams to fill one of the at-large positions. The various reductions in the bowl eligibility criteria are discussed below.

== Current criteria ==
As of 2018–19 bowl season, a Football Bowl Subdivision (FBS) team was required to meet the following criteria to participate in a bowl game:

1. The team must have at least as many wins as overall losses. Wins against non-Division I teams do not count toward the number of wins.
2. No more than one win against a Football Championship Subdivision (FCS) team may count toward that win total, and only if the FCS team has awarded at least 90% of the scholarships that FCS rules allowed it to award over the last two years. (Currently, that means that wins against Ivy League, Georgetown, Pioneer Football League, and some Northeast Conference teams do not count.) The requirement that the FCS team must have awarded 90% of its allowed scholarships may be waived if a "unique or catastrophic situation" prevented the FCS team from meeting that requirement.
3. A team that has a losing record only because it lost its conference championship game remains eligible for a bowl.

If there are not enough eligible teams to fill all the bowl slots, additional teams may be selected, according to the following priorities, which must be applied in descending order:

1. Teams which would have met the eligibility criteria if not for the fact that they had one win against an FCS team that did not meet the scholarship requirement and no waiver was granted.
2. Teams which played 13 games during the regular season and finished with a 6–7 record.
3. Teams in their second year of reclassification from FCS to FBS football.
4. Teams with at least 5 wins and no more than 7 losses, in order of their Academic Progress Rates (APRs).

=== Exceptions ===
In mid-October 2020, during the COVID-19 pandemic, the NCAA waived bowl eligibility requirements for the 2020–21 bowl season, intended "to allow as many student-athletes as possible the opportunity to participate in bowl games this year."

== History ==
On April 26, 2006, the NCAA announced that they were relaxing the rules for eligibility starting with the 2006–07 bowl season, particularly in light of the new twelve-game college football season. Now, teams with a minimum non-losing, or .500, record can qualify for bowl games if their conference has a contract with a bowl game. Also, other teams with a minimum non-losing .500 record (i.e., 6–6) could earn bowl bids if all other FBS teams with winning records have been taken and postseason spots still remain vacant. In thirteen-game seasons (used because of conference championship games, or allowable for Hawaiʻi and any of its home opponents in a given season), a team must win seven games.

Occasionally, there will be more bowl-eligible teams than there are spots in the NCAA football bowl games in the season. In these cases, some bowl-eligible teams will not be invited to play in any NCAA football bowl game (usually teams from Group of Five conferences). Typically, teams with seven or more wins will not be left out of bowl games, although there are times, most recently the 2012–13 bowl season, that see at least one such team uninvited. Before the 2010–11 bowl season, the Division I rulebook, specifically Bylaw 30.9.2.1, had several provisions that attempted to ensure that teams with seven wins will receive preference for bowl bids:

- Bowl games that have a contract with a conference must select a team with at least seven wins if one is available.
- Any bowl berths that become eligible when a conference fails to meet its contracted tie-ins must first be filled by any eligible seven-win teams before any remaining FBS 6–6 teams can be accommodated.
- Additionally, conferences are not allowed to sign contingency agreements with bowl games that would allow 6–6 teams from their conferences to receive bowl berths at the expense of any potential team with seven or more wins. While this does not prevent conferences from signing contingency agreements that are triggered when a second conference is unable to provide enough eligible teams to fill all of its contracted berths, it does not allow a 6–6 team from the contingency conference access to a bowl game over a seven win team from a third conference.

In the 2008–09 bowl season, these rules affected bowls contracted to the Big 12 and Pac-10, which each had at least one more bowl slot than eligible teams. The same applies to bowls contracted to the SEC. However, in that season, the WAC had a contingency agreement with one of the Pac-10's bowls, specifically the Poinsettia Bowl, providing that the bowl would select a WAC team (ultimately Boise State) if the Pac-10 did not have enough teams to fulfill their bowl contracts. The same contingency agreement applied in that season to the Sun Belt Conference and the PapaJohns.com, Independence, and St. Petersburg bowls. Similarly, these rules affected bowls contracted to the ACC in the 2009–10 bowl season because that conference has nine bowl tie-ins, but only had seven eligible teams that season.

Starting with the 2011–12 bowl season, the rule that required the selection of seven-win teams before any 6–6 teams was eliminated. The first season of the new rule saw Temple go uninvited despite going 8–4, including a win over eventual Big East BCS representative Connecticut. In the 2010–11 bowl season, the UCLA Bruins were invited to a bowl game despite a losing record after playing a conference championship game (6–6 in regular season, played and lost the Pac-12 championship game in extenuating circumstances), while a 7–5 winning team (Western Kentucky) and a 6–6 non-losing team (Ball State) did not receive invites.

Like NCAA sports where a tournament determines an automatic conference bid to the postseason tournament, a team can finish with a losing record (or a winning record but not eligible because of FCS wins) and still appear in a bowl game. In another change to bowl eligibility rules that took effect in 2010–11, a team that wins its conference but has an overall losing record must receive an NCAA waiver to appear in a bowl game. Previously, the waiver required no NCAA action. The new rule is still largely consistent with the NCAA rules in all other team sports, where a team that has a losing record that wins their conference championship through the conference tournament earns the automatic bid to the NCAA tournament.

The NCAA typically awarded waivers in extenuating circumstances when a 6–6 team played in a conference championship game as a result of the division winning team being ineligible because of sanctions. This prevents the conference championship game from affecting bowl eligibility of team that advances to the conference championship in case of division-winning teams being sanctioned. The Pac-12 and ACC have both used it for such division champions, UCLA in 2011 and Georgia Tech in 2012, both of which were 6–6 and advanced to the conference championship game as a result of sanctions to the division winning teams (USC in the 2011 Pac-12 South, North Carolina and Miami in the 2012 ACC Coastal). Both lost in their conference championship games, but the NCAA awarded both waivers. Starting with the 2013–14 bowl season, this waiver is established by rule and all 6–6 teams participating in a conference championship game will be bowl-eligible.

=== 2012 revised criteria ===
On August 2, 2012, the NCAA Division I Board of Directors approved a significant change to the process to determine bowl-eligible teams, going so far as to potentially allow 5–7 teams to go to a bowl, in case there were not enough regular bowl-eligible teams to fill every game. If a bowl has one or more conferences/teams unable to meet their contractual commitments and there are no available bowl-eligible teams, the open spots can be filled – by the particular bowl's sponsoring agencies – as follows:

1. Teams finishing 6–6 with one win against a team from the lower Football Championship Subdivision (FCS), regardless of whether that FCS school meets NCAA scholarship requirements. Until now, an FCS win counted only if that opponent met the scholarship requirements—specifically, that school had to award at least 90% of the FCS maximum of 63 scholarship equivalents over a two-year period. As of the 2021 season, programs in three FCS conferences cannot meet the 90% requirement (56.7 equivalents)—the Ivy League, which prohibits all athletic scholarships; the Pioneer Football League, which does not currently award football scholarships; and the Northeast Conference, which limits football scholarships to 45 equivalents. In addition, Georgetown does not offer football scholarships despite playing in the Patriot League, a conference which has allowed football scholarships since 2013.
2. 6–6 teams with two wins over FCS schools. (This provision was later removed in 2017.)
3. Teams that finish 6–7 with loss number seven in their conference championship game. (These teams received automatic waivers starting in 2014.)
4. 6–7 teams that normally play a 13-game schedule, such as Hawaii and their home opponents. The NCAA permits Hawaii and teams who play at Hawaii to play an additional game during the regular season to recoup their unusually high travel costs to and from the mainland.
5. FCS teams who are in the final year of the two-year FBS transition process, if they have at least a 6–6 record.
6. Finally, 5–7 teams that have a top-five Academic Progress Rate (APR) score. This was later adjusted to allow other 5–7 teams to be selected thereafter—in order of their APR.

=== 2015–20 bowl seasons ===
The 2015–16 bowl season featured a record 40 bowl games, and three teams with losing records (San Jose State, Minnesota, and Nebraska; each 5–7). Despite this, the Arizona Bowl was unable to fill teams via its Conference USA or alternate Sun Belt Conference tie-ins, leading to both teams being from the Mountain West Conference, marking the first time since the 1979 Orange Bowl that a non-championship bowl game was played between members of the same conference.

The 2016–17 bowl season again featured 40 bowl games, and three teams with losing records (6–7 Hawaii, 5–7 Mississippi State, and 5–7 North Texas).

The 2017–18 bowl season featured 39 bowl games due to the discontinuation of the Poinsettia Bowl, with all bowl slots filled by teams with winning or .500 records; UTSA at 6–5 did not receive a bowl bid, while 15 teams with 6–6 records were selected.

The 2018–19 bowl season again filled all slots for 39 bowl games with teams having winning or .500 records. One team with a winning record, Southern Miss at 6–5, did not receive a bowl invitation, while there were 10 teams with 6–6 records selected.

=== 2020–21 bowl season ===
The 2020–21 bowl season saw a record nine teams with losing records accept bowl bids, after impacts of the COVID-19 pandemic.

- The NCAA waived eligibility requirements "to allow as many student-athletes as possible the opportunity to participate in bowl games this year." The Pac-12 Conference still required teams to have a .500 record to be considered.
- Fourteen existing bowls were cancelled, either due to either travel restrictions (Bahamas Bowl and Hawaii Bowl), availability of teams (Birmingham Bowl, Frisco Bowl, Guaranteed Rate Bowl, Independence Bowl, and Military Bowl), general pandemic effects (Holiday Bowl, Las Vegas Bowl, Pinstripe Bowl, Redbox Bowl, Sun Bowl, Gasparilla Bowl) or no formal reason (Quick Lane Bowl).
- The Fenway Bowl and LA Bowl postponed their debuts to the 2021–22 bowl season, with the Montgomery Bowl announced as a "substitute of the Fenway Bowl for this season only".
- Eighteen teams with non-losing records opted out of bowl consideration in advance of the final College Football Playoff (CFP) rankings being released on December 20:
  - ACC: 6–5 Boston College, 6–5 Pittsburgh and 5–5 Virginia
  - SEC: 5–5 LSU, as part of a self-imposed one-year postseason ban due to NCAA rule violations
  - PAC-12: 2–2 Arizona State Sun Devils, 4–2 Stanford, 5–1 South Division champion USC, 3–2 Utah, and 3–1 North Division champion Washington (also foregoing the 2020 Pac-12 Football Championship Game)
  - MAC: six teams were opted out by the conference's reported decision to only allow top two teams to go to bowl games— 3–3 Central Michigan, 3–1 Kent State, 2–1 Miami (OH), 2–1 Ohio, 4–2 Toledo and 4–2 Western Michigan.
  - Other "Group of Five" conferences: 5-2 Boise State, 4–4 San Diego State, 7–3 SMU (originally selected to play in the Frisco Bowl)

=== 2021–present bowl seasons ===
The 2021–22 bowl season featured 44 bowl games with everything largely back to normal after the turmoil of the previous season due to the COVID-19 pandemic. Hawaii were the only team with a losing record, 6–7, selected. They were paired against the 6–6 Memphis Tigers in the 2021 Hawaii Bowl, but ultimately withdrew due to COVID-19 concerns. 17 teams with a 6–6 record were invited and accepted into bowl games. In addition, after initial bowl selections had been made, 5–7 Rutgers replaced 8–4 Texas A&M in the December 2021 Gator Bowl after positive COVID-19 tests within the Texas A&M program. Rutgers became the only team with a losing record to play a bowl game that season, losing to Wake Forest.

The next three bowl seasons each had a single team with a 5–7 record play in a bowl game. The 2025–26 bowl season saw three 5–7 teams accept bowl bids, after several bowl-eligible teams (notably 10–2 Notre Dame) declined to participate.

== Bowl teams with losing records ==
The following teams within FBS (or its predecessors, such as Division I-A and University Division) entered bowl games with losing records.

Season	Team	Record	Win pct.	Bowl game	Result	Ref.
1935	USC	4–7	.364	1935 Poi Bowl	W, 38–6	
1937	Hawaii (Note: Hawaii, with a losing record of 2–5, also won the Poi Bowl for the 1936 season. The University of Hawaii website does not count that win as an official bowl victory as their competition consisted of local Honolulu All-Stars.)	2–5	.286	1937 Poi Bowl	L, 13–53	
1939	Hawaii	3–5	.375	1940 Pineapple Bowl	L, 6–39	
1940	Hawaii	2–4	.333	1941 Pineapple Bowl	L, 0–3	
1945	Fresno State	4–5–2	.455	1946 Raisin Bowl	L, 12–13	
1945	South Carolina	2–3–3	.438	1946 Gator Bowl	L, 14–26	
1950	Denver	3–7–1	.318	1951 Pineapple Bowl	L, 27–28	
1951	Hawaii	4–6	.400	1952 Pineapple Bowl	L, 13–34	
1963	SMU	4–6	.400	1963 Sun Bowl	L, 14–21	
1970	William & Mary	5–6	.455	1970 Tangerine Bowl	L, 12–40	
2001	North Texas	5–6	.455	2001 New Orleans Bowl	L, 20–45	
2011	UCLA	6–7 (Note: These teams had 6–6 regular season records then lost their conference's championship game before playing in a bowl game.)	.462	2011 Kraft Fight Hunger Bowl (December)	L, 14–20	
2012	Georgia Tech	6–7	.462	2012 Sun Bowl	W, 21–7	
2014	Fresno State	6–7	.462	2014 Hawaii Bowl	L, 6–30	
2015	Nebraska	5–7	.417	2015 Foster Farms Bowl	W, 37–29	
2015	Minnesota	5–7	.417	2015 Quick Lane Bowl	W, 21–14	
2015	San Jose State	5–7	.417	2015 Cure Bowl	W, 27–16	
2016	Hawaii	6–7	.462	2016 Hawaii Bowl	W, 52–35	
2016	Mississippi State	5–7	.417	2016 St. Petersburg Bowl	W, 17–16	
2016	North Texas	5–7	.417	2016 Heart of Dallas Bowl	L, 31–38 (OT)	
2020 (Note: In addition to the 2020 teams listed, Tennessee accepted an invitation to the Liberty Bowl with a 3–7 record, South Carolina accepted an invitation to the Gasparilla Bowl with a 2–8 record, and Arkansas accepted a bid to the Texas Bowl with a 3–7 record. Tennessee and South Carolina had to withdraw due to COVID-19 issues, and the Texas Bowl was cancelled after Arkansas' opponent withdrew due to COVID-19 issues.)	Houston	3–4	.429	2020 New Mexico Bowl	L, 14–28	
2020	Kentucky	4–6	.400	2021 Gator Bowl	W, 23–21	
2020	Mississippi State	3–7	.300	2020 Armed Forces Bowl (December)	W, 28–26	
2020	North Texas	4–5	.444	2020 Myrtle Beach Bowl	L, 28–56	
2020	Ole Miss	4–5	.444	2021 Outback Bowl	W, 26–20	
2020	Western Kentucky	5–6	.455	2020 LendingTree Bowl (December)	L, 21–39	
2021	Hawaii	6–7	.462	2021 Hawaii Bowl	Canceled (Note: In 2021, the Hawaii Bowl was canceled due to Hawaii's withdrawal, which was due to injuries and COVID-19 issues within the team.)	
2021	Rutgers (Note: In 2021, Texas A&M (8–4) withdrew from the Gator Bowl due to an insufficient number of players being available. The NCAA announced that Rutgers, having the highest Academic Progress Rate (APR) of five-win teams, was the first eligible replacement team—Rutgers accepted the bid.)	5–7	.417	2021 Gator Bowl (December)	L, 10–38	
2022	Rice	5–7	.417	2022 LendingTree Bowl	L, 24–38	
2023	Minnesota	5–7	.417	2023 Quick Lane Bowl	W, 30–24	
2024	Louisiana Tech (Note: In 2024, Marshall (10–3) withdrew from the Independence Bowl because it had at least 25 players enter the transfer portal. Louisiana Tech did not have the highest APR of all five-win teams, but was placed into the Independence Bowl given the unfeasibility of finding another team on short notice.)	5–7	.417	2024 Independence Bowl	L, 6–27	
2025	Appalachian State	5–7	.417	2025 Birmingham Bowl	L, 10–29	
2025	Mississippi State	5–7	.417	2026 Duke's Mayo Bowl	L, 29–43	
2025	Rice	5–7	.417	2026 Armed Forces Bowl	L, 10–41	

== See also ==
- Automatic bids to college bowl games
