= Greg Schiano =

American football coach (born 1966)

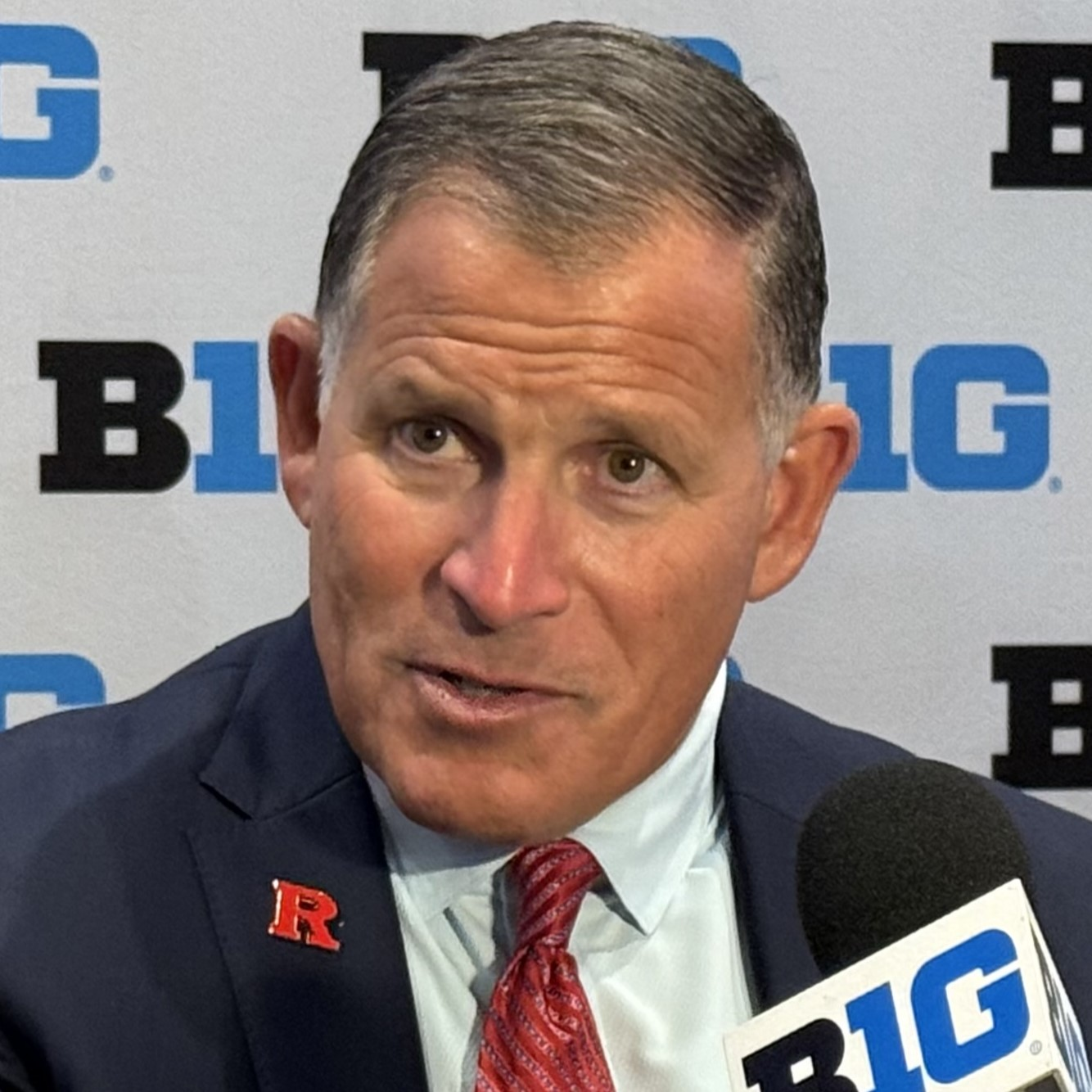
- Schiano at Rutgers in 2025

Current position
- Title: Head coach
- Team: Rutgers
- Conference: Big Ten
- Record: 102–116 (.468)
- Annual salary: $6.25 million

Biographical details
- Born: June 1, 1966 (age 60); Wyckoff, New Jersey, U.S.

Playing career
- 1985–1987: Bucknell
- Position: Linebacker

Coaching career (HC unless noted)
- 1988: Ramapo HS (NJ) (assistant)
- 1989: Rutgers (GA)
- 1990: Penn State (GA)
- 1991–1995: Penn State (DB)
- 1996–1997: Chicago Bears (defensive assistant)
- 1998: Chicago Bears (DB)
- 1999–2000: Miami (FL) (DC)
- 2001–2011: Rutgers
- 2012–2013: Tampa Bay Buccaneers
- 2016–2018: Ohio State (AHC/DC)
- 2020–present: Rutgers

Head coaching record
- Overall: 102–116 (college); 11–21 (NFL)
- Bowls: 6–3

Accomplishments and honors

Awards
- Eddie Robinson Coach of the Year (2006); George Munger Award (2006); Home Depot Coach of the Year (2006); Liberty Mutual Coach of the Year (2006); Walter Camp Coach of the Year (2006); Big East Coach of the Year (2006)

Gregory Edward Schiano (born June 1, 1966) is an American football coach. He is currently the head football coach at Rutgers University, a position he held from 2001 to 2011 and resumed before the 2020 season. Schiano has the most wins in program history as head football coach of the Rutgers Scarlet Knights football team. He also served as the head coach for the Tampa Bay Buccaneers of the National Football League (NFL) from 2012 to 2013.

== Early life and education ==
Schiano was born and grew up in Wyckoff, New Jersey, and attended Ramapo High School. He then attended Bucknell University, where he was a member of Phi Gamma Delta fraternity, and graduated in 1988 with a B.S. in business administration. Despite being a 190-pound linebacker in high school, Bucknell assistant Joe Susan felt he was a perfect fit for the defense. Susan would later join Schiano at Rutgers.

== Playing career ==
Playing at linebacker, Schiano was a three-year letterman at Bucknell. In his junior year, he led the team with 114 tackles and was named to the All-Conference team. In his senior year, he was named team captain and was named to the Sporting News Pre-season All-America Team.

== Coaching career ==
Schiano began his coaching career in 1988 as an assistant coach at Ramapo High School for the Raiders football team. In 1989, he served as a graduate assistant at Rutgers. In 1990, he took the same position at Penn State. He later served as the defensive backfield coach there from 1991 to 1995. From 1996 to 1998, Schiano was an assistant coach in the NFL with the Chicago Bears. For his first two seasons there, he was a defensive assistant, and then was promoted in his third and final season with the Bears to defensive backfield coach.

=== University of Miami ===
Schiano served as defensive coordinator for the University of Miami Hurricanes from 1999 to 2000. In 1999, Miami finished the year ranked 12th in the NCAA's Division I-A in points allowed per game (17.2), and in 2000 moved up to 5th (15.5 points allowed per game). His brief 18-month stint at Miami and his roots in New Jersey made him a candidate for his next position as head coach at Rutgers University.

While at the University of Miami, Schiano coached NFL Pro Bowlers Dan Morgan, Jonathan Vilma, and Ed Reed.

=== Rutgers ===
On December 1, 2000, Schiano accepted the head coaching position at Rutgers, the State University of New Jersey. He was given the task of turning around a struggling program that had been without a bowl game appearance since the 1978 Garden State Bowl, and had just four winning seasons since 1980. Although Schiano was producing solid recruiting classes, especially by Rutgers standards, the Scarlet Knights struggled to losing records in his first four seasons as head coach. It was believed coming into the 2005 season that Schiano was on the hot seat and would need to take Rutgers to a bowl game to keep his job.

==== 2005 ====
Despite the rough start to his tenure at Rutgers, Schiano began to turn around the program during the 2005 season. Schiano recruited New York native Ray Rice, who was considered the top running back in the tri-state area. He coached Rutgers to a 7–4 record that season. The highlight of their season came in a nationally televised 37–29 upset win over Pittsburgh and their coach Dave Wannstedt, a long-time friend of Schiano's, who hired him while coaching the Chicago Bears. At season's end, Schiano and the Scarlet Knights accepted a bid to play in the Insight Bowl against Arizona State, which Rutgers lost by a score of 45–40.

Just prior to the game, Schiano was offered a new contract, extending his contract through the 2012 season. The 2005 season laid the foundation for a rebirth of the Rutgers football program.

==== 2006 ====
In the 2006 season, Schiano's Scarlet Knights raced off to a 9–0 record, highlighted by their November 9 victory over the third-ranked, undefeated Louisville Cardinals. After this game, Rutgers jumped to seventh in the national AP Poll, which was their highest ranking in school history and first Top 25 ranking since 1976. The euphoria from the win and high ranking quickly faded the following week with a loss to Cincinnati, but the Scarlet Knights bounced back to finish 11–2 and qualify for the inaugural Texas Bowl. There, they would defeat the Kansas State Wildcats 37–10, capturing their first-ever bowl game win in school history.

Throughout the season, coach Schiano and Rutgers were featured prominently in both the local and national media, and Schiano's motivational phrase "keep choppin'" became part of the lexicon of college football. Rutgers finished the season ranked 12th in the national poll, their best finish in school history. For his work in the 2006 season, Coach Schiano was awarded several Coach of the Year honors, including the Home Depot Coach of the Year award and the inaugural Liberty Mutual Coach of the Year Award.

With high expectations after their "Cinderella" season, Schiano coached Rutgers to respectable finishes and three more bowl game victories to give them four in a row. Schiano's team experienced tragedy in 2010, when defensive tackle Eric LeGrand suffered a spinal cord injury. This clearly affected the team's play: when the extent of LeGrand's injury became apparent, it contributed to sending Rutgers into a funk that resulted in a six-game losing streak to end the season.

Schiano has been credited for his involvement in LeGrand's recovery, essentially treating LeGrand's family like his own and assisting the family in any way needed, and being with LeGrand every day he was in the hospital. Though LeGrand was initially given a diagnosis of lifetime paralysis, he has since regained movement in his arms and shoulders and sensation throughout his body.

==== 2011 ====
In 2011, Rutgers rebounded from the previous season to post a 9–4 record and once again earn a bowl game berth. In the Pinstripe Bowl, they defeated Iowa State 27–13, which would be his final game as Rutgers coach. He led the team to winning seasons and bowl game berths in six of his final seven seasons, with wins in the final five bowl games.

NFL players who played under Schiano at Rutgers: 2001—2011 (All have retired)

- San Francisco 49ers wide receiver Mohamed Sanu
- Cincinnati Bengals long snapper/tight end Clark Harris
- Tennessee Titans cornerback Jason McCourty
- Baltimore Ravens running back Ray Rice
- Tennessee Titans wide receiver Kenny Britt
- New England Patriots wide receiver Tiquan Underwood
- New England Patriots free safety Devin McCourty
- New England Patriots free safety Logan Ryan
- New England Patriots linebacker Jonathan Freeny
- New England Patriots safety Duron Harmon
- Seattle Seahawks quarterback Mike Teel
- Baltimore Ravens center Jeremy Zuttah
- Pittsburgh Steelers center Darnell Stapleton
- Cincinnati Bengals fullback Brian Leonard
- San Francisco 49ers right Tackle Anthony Davis
- Minnesota Vikings fullback Ryan D’Imperio

=== Tampa Bay Buccaneers ===
On January 26, 2012, Schiano accepted his first head coaching opportunity at the professional level, with the NFL's Tampa Bay Buccaneers. The Buccaneers ended the 2012 regular season with a 7–9 record, missing the playoffs in the process. In the 2013 season, the team regressed to 4–12. On December 30, 2013, the Buccaneers fired Schiano along with Mark Dominik, the general manager who had selected him.

Schiano's tenure with Tampa Bay contained many controversies, including his directive for players to dive at opposing team's legs while in victory formation, allegations that Schiano rigged a vote for team captains, Schiano launching into a tirade at special teams coordinator Bob Ligashesky during a team drill for walking, "onto the wrong area of the practice field" and threatening to fire him, a contentious relationship with quarterback Josh Freeman, an outbreak of MRSA and the subsequent injury designation of one of the infected players, Lawrence Tynes. Defensive end E. J. Wilson left the game of football in part due to Schiano's treatment of players. Another player quipped that playing under Schiano was, "like being in Cuba."

=== Ohio State ===
In 2016, after two seasons coaching Berkeley Preparatory School and sending two players to Davidson College in North Carolina, Schiano was hired by head coach Urban Meyer to serve as defensive coordinator/associate head coach for the Ohio State Buckeyes football program, replacing Chris Ash who, coincidentally, left Ohio State to accept the head coaching position at Rutgers.

Following two successful seasons with top ten defenses as Ohio State's defensive coordinator, Schiano became a target for several coaching jobs both in the NCAA and NFL. On November 26, 2017, it was reported that he was going to be the next head coach for the Tennessee Volunteers. However fan disapproval due to his connection with the Penn State sexual abuse case led Tennessee to back out of the deal and he remained at Ohio State. Less than six weeks later, it was once again reported that Schiano would be leaving, but this time he would be going back to the NFL as the New England Patriots' defensive coordinator. On February 7, 2018, Schiano decided to turn down the Patriots job and stay with the Buckeyes.

In 2018, Schiano was named 247Sports Recruiter of the Year in the Big Ten after helping the Buckeyes land the nation's second-ranked recruiting class. He finished second nationally in 247Sports Recruiter of the Year rankings. Schiano served as the primary recruiter for five-star offensive tackle Nicholas Petit-Frere, the nation's second-ranked tight end Jeremy Ruckert and the nation's top-ranked center Matthew Jones. Schiano also served as the primary recruiter on center Luke Wypler, safety Josh Proctor, safety Ronnie Hickman, defensive tackle Tyler Friday and linebacker Javontae Jean-Baptiste. Schiano was also credited with helping land cornerback Jeffrey Okudah. In a story written by Okudah in The Players Tribune, Okudah said: Last June, Coach Schiano at Ohio State said something that really stuck with me. In fact, I think it ultimately played a big part in my decision to go there. He told me, "Jeff, you've had a tough life up to this point. It's time for some good things to happen to you."

While the Ohio State defense struggled in 2018 after losing defensive end Nick Bosa, Schiano took on a larger role, helping then interim head coach Ryan Day during head coach Urban Meyer's suspension. After the win against TCU, Day credited Schiano for his help leading the program during tough times. "What Greg Schiano has done for me in the last month is something I'll never forget. He is the classiest person I've ever been around in the coaching profession. The way he's handled himself, helping me along the way, counseling me on day-to-day stuff." Schiano also led the punt block unit and was credited for a unique scheme design that led to punt blocks for a safety against Nebraska and a touchdown against Michigan. Per Urban Meyer after the Nebraska game, "That was a tremendous momentum-changer. You wish you could have recovered it for a touchdown but we got a safety and got the ball back."

In Schiano's three seasons as defensive coordinator with the Buckeyes, eleven defensive players were drafted to the NFL, including five first round picks (Lattimore, Hooker, Conley), with two being top five selections (Ward and Bosa). Former Browns interim head coach and defensive coordinator Greg Williams credited Schiano with cornerback Denzel Ward's early development. "He (Ward) came here and has already shown some people—I think (Ohio State associate head coach/defensive coordinator) Greg Schiano did a great job of teaching some of those things there. He has been an example from Day 1 on how to play the ball in the air in man to man, and it has kind of bled to the group. I think Denzel set that example pretty well back in the spring. He still does a pretty good job of playing the ball. He has a very natural way of doing that."

=== New England Patriots ===
In February 2019, it was announced that Schiano would not be returning to Ohio State. It was reported that he was hired to join the New England Patriots as their defensive coordinator, but prior to the Patriots confirming this report, Schiano unexpectedly resigned from the Patriots on March 28, citing a desire to spend more time on his "faith and family."

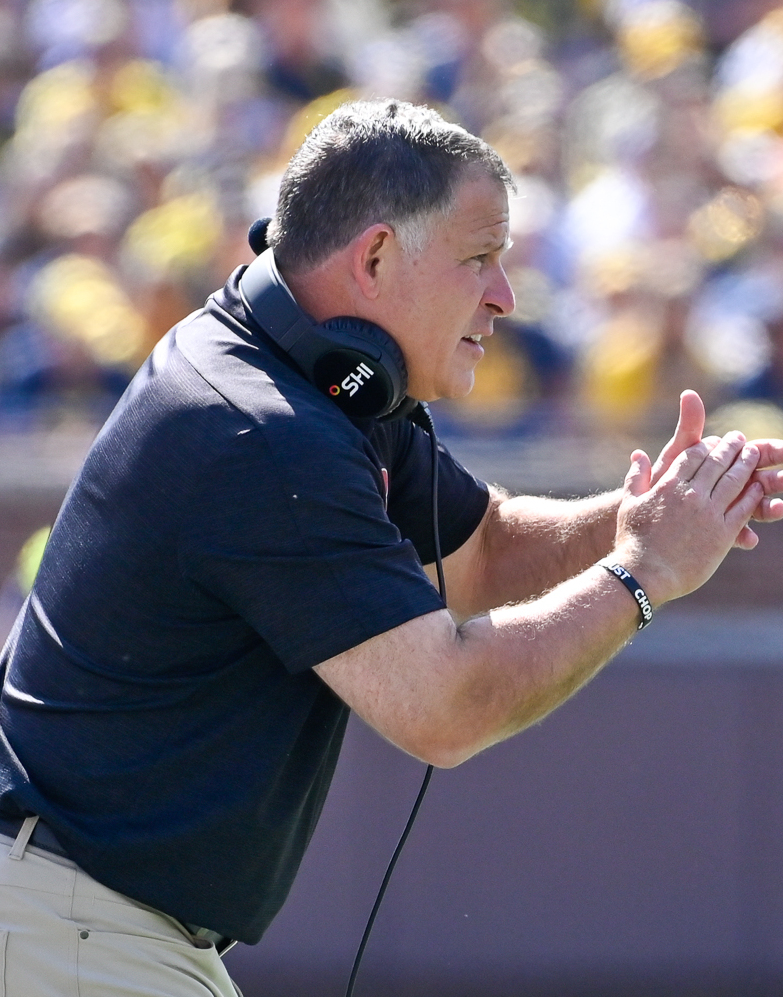
Schiano in 2023

=== Return to Rutgers ===
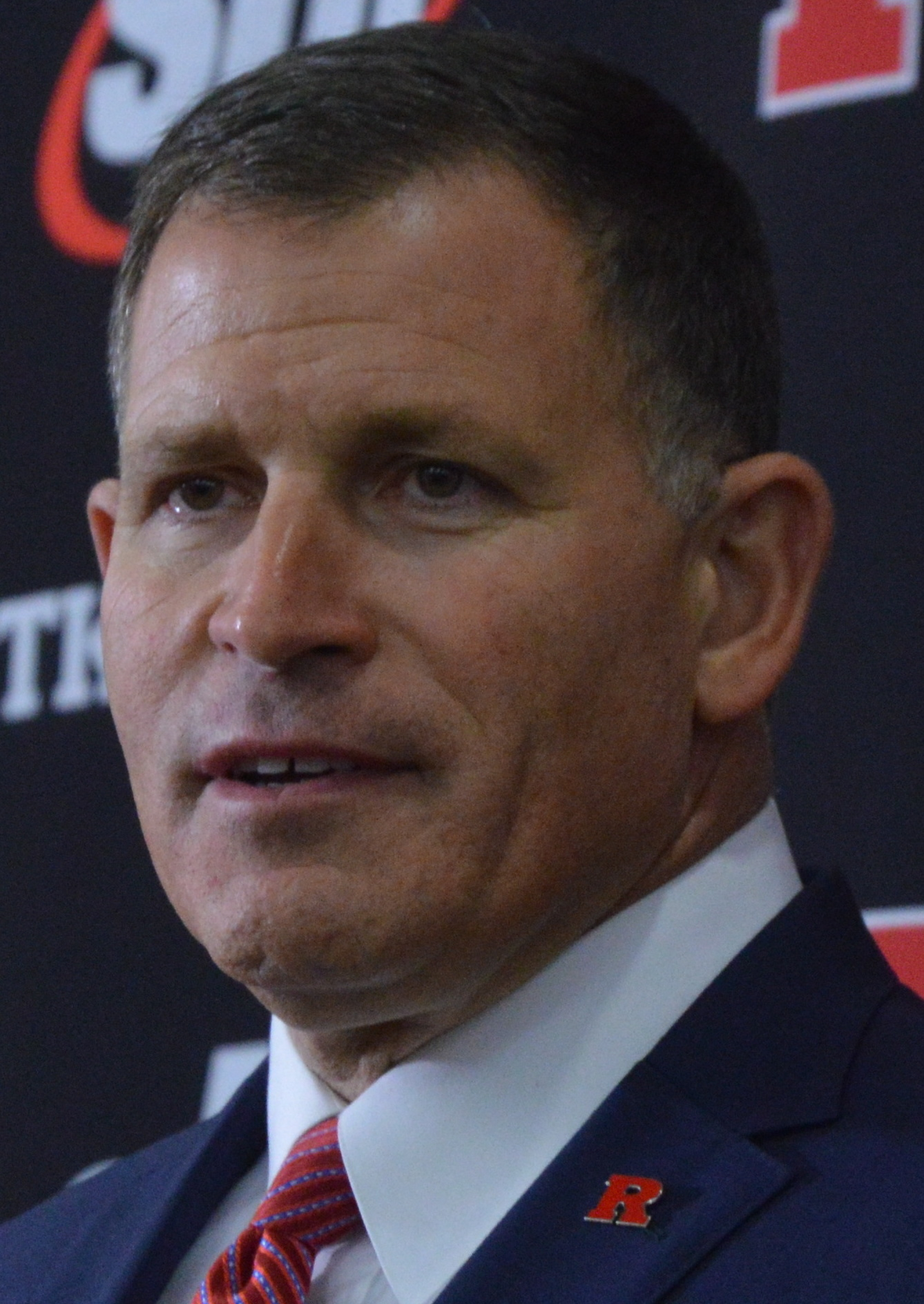
Schiano speaks at his first press conference after returning to Piscataway in 2019.

On December 1, 2019, after several weeks of negotiations and a groundswell of fan and booster support, Schiano rejoined Rutgers as the head coach, signing an eight-year, $32 million contract.

During the 2022 campaign, Schiano surpassed coach Frank R. Burns as head coach with the most wins in Rutgers program history.

Schiano led Rutgers back to bowl eligibility with a 6–6 regular season in 2023, winning a game during postseason play for the first time since 2014 by defeating Miami in the 2023 Pinstripe Bowl 31–24.

In 2023, Schiano agreed to a contract that extended his tenure to 2030.

In 2024, Schiano led Rutgers to back-to-back winning seasons, with the Scarlet Knights winning 7 regular season games and setting a program record for most Big Ten victories in a season. NFL players who played under Schiano at Rutgers: 2020—present

- RB Isiah Pacheco (Kansas City Chiefs)
- WR/CB Bo Melton (Green Bay Packers)
- CB Max Melton (Arizona Cardinals)
- K Jude McAtamney (New York Giants)
- S Christian Izien (Tampa Bay Buccaneers)
- CB Christian Braswell (Jacksonville Jaguars)
- LB Olakunle Fatukasi (Los Angeles Rams)
- CB Tre Avery (San Francisco 49ers)
- OT Raiqwon O'Neal (Tampa Bay Buccaneers)
- RB Kyle Monangai (Chicago Bears)
- QB Athan Kaliakmanis (Washington Commanders)

On September 25, 2026, Schiano earned his 100th victory as Rutgers head coach with a 58–7 win over Howard.

== Controversy over involvement in Penn State scandal ==
In 2016, a Philadelphia court released documents in relation to the Penn State child sex abuse scandal revealing testimony from Mike McQueary stating that Schiano was aware of the abuse by fellow assistant coach Jerry Sandusky during his time as a grad assistant and defensive backs coach for the Nittany Lions. In his testimony, McQueary claimed that Tom Bradley told him that: "only that he had—I can't remember if it was one night or one morning—but that Greg had come into his office white as a ghost and said he just saw Jerry doing something to a boy in the shower. And that's it. That's all he ever told me." Schiano denied having knowledge of the abuse. Bradley also denied telling McQueary that story. Sandusky, at trial, was found not guilty on any charge described by McQueary.

On November 26, 2017, the University of Tennessee was considering Schiano as the head football coach. However, due to a social media campaign including state representatives, alumni, national and local sportswriters, fans, and gubernatorial candidates, unhappy with Schiano's tenure at Penn State during the child sex abuse scandal, Tennessee opted for a better fit. Afterwards, officials from both Penn State and Ohio State defended Schiano, saying he had nothing to do with the scandal. Tennessee received criticism from many observers in the media and the sport for overreacting to fans on social media. Tennessee ultimately hired Jeremy Pruitt as their head coach shortly afterward, while Schiano returned to Ohio State as defensive coordinator.

== Personal life ==
Schiano is married and has four children. Schiano's wife Christy (née Mitchell) is one of four children born to Ella Alexander and the late Tom Mitchell. Schiano's father-in-law was a former Colts tight end who had played his college football at Bucknell. Mitchell died of cancer at 72 on July 16, 2017.

== Awards and bowl bids ==
Schiano received most of the major 2006 national Coach of the Year awards after significantly elevating a college football team's quality, resulting in the Scarlet Knights becoming a winning football program (see above).

On December 4, 2006, one day after Rutgers accepted a bid to play in the 2006 Texas Bowl against Kansas State, Schiano announced that he would not be a candidate for the recently vacated head coaching job at his previous employer, the University of Miami, ending rumors and speculation that he would leave his creation at upstart Rutgers to return to Miami. He stated that he is "very happy at Rutgers" and that Rutgers is just beginning to "scratch the surface" of what the team can accomplish. He confirmed this by signing yet another contract extension, announced on February 16, 2007, upping his yearly compensation to $1.5 million per year and extending his deal with Rutgers to 2016. Schiano's 2011 salary and compensation of $2.3 million made him "by far" the highest-paid public employee in New Jersey, as well as the highest-paid coach in the Big East.

In December 2007, the Star-Ledger reported that Schiano spoke with University of Michigan athletic director Bill Martin "for quite a while" on December 5 about the head-coaching vacancy at the school. Two days later, he withdrew his name from consideration and remained Rutgers' head coach. In 2008, after a bad start, his Knights ended up 8–5 with their fourth straight bowl bid. Schiano's name once again came up in general speculation about the Miami head coaching position in 2010, after the firing of Randy Shannon.

== The Schiano Proposal ==
In 2011, after defensive tackle Eric LeGrand was paralyzed during a kickoff, Schiano came up with an idea for eliminating kickoffs from football, replacing them with a punt, which is less likely to cause serious injury to the players. Under his proposal, the team would start from their own 30 (or 35) yard line and have the choice of either punting the ball or, in lieu of an onside kick, face the equivalent of a 4th down and 15. As of 2020, neither the NFL nor NCAA has seriously considered this proposal. Sportswriter Jon Bois has been an advocate for the proposal, saying "it's simple, obvious, less dangerous, and more fun".

== Head coaching record ==
=== College ===
Year	Team	Overall	Conference	Standing	Bowl/playoffs	Coaches^{#}	AP^{°}
Rutgers Scarlet Knights (Big East Conference) (2001–2011)
2001	Rutgers	2–9	0–7	8th			
2002	Rutgers	1–11	0–7	8th			
2003	Rutgers	5–7	2–5	7th			
2004	Rutgers	4–7	1–5	6th			
2005	Rutgers	7–5	4–3	3rd	L Insight		
2006	Rutgers	11–2	5–2	T–2nd	W Texas	12	12
2007	Rutgers	8–5	3–4	T–5th	W International		
2008	Rutgers	8–5	5–2	T–2nd	W Papajohns.com		
2009	Rutgers	9–4	3–4	T–4th	W St. Petersburg		
2010	Rutgers	4–8	1–6	8th			
2011	Rutgers	9–4	4–3	T–4th	W Pinstripe		
Rutgers Scarlet Knights (Big Ten Conference) (2020–present)
2020	Rutgers	3–6	3–6	5th (East)			
2021	Rutgers	5–8	2–7	6th (East)	L Gator		
2022	Rutgers	4–8	1–8	7th (East)			
2023	Rutgers	7–6	3–6	5th (East)	W Pinstripe		
2024	Rutgers	7–6	4–5	T–9th	L Rate		
2025	Rutgers	5–7	2–7	T–14th			
2026	Rutgers	3–8	2–6				
Rutgers:		102–116	45–94				
Total:		102–116					
^{#}Rankings from final Coaches Poll.; ^{°}Rankings from final AP Poll.

=== NFL ===
Team	Year	Regular season					Postseason			
Team	Year	Won	Lost	Ties	Win %	Finish	Won	Lost	Win %	Result
TB	2012	7	9	0	.438	4th in NFC South	–	–	–	–
TB	2013	4	12	0	.250	4th in NFC South	–	–	–	–
TB Total		11	21	0	.344		–	–	–	–
Total		11	21	0	.344		–	–	–	–
