= 2021 Gator Bowl =

2021 Gator Bowl may refer to:

- 2021 Gator Bowl (January), played as part of the 2020–21 college football bowl season between Kentucky and NC State on January 2, 2021
- 2021 Gator Bowl (December), scheduled as part of the 2021–22 college football bowl season between Wake Forest and Rutgers on December 31, 2021
