= 2021 Peach Bowl (December) =

Postseason college football bowl game

2021 Chick-fil-A Peach Bowl
- CFP New Year's Six; 54th Peach Bowl
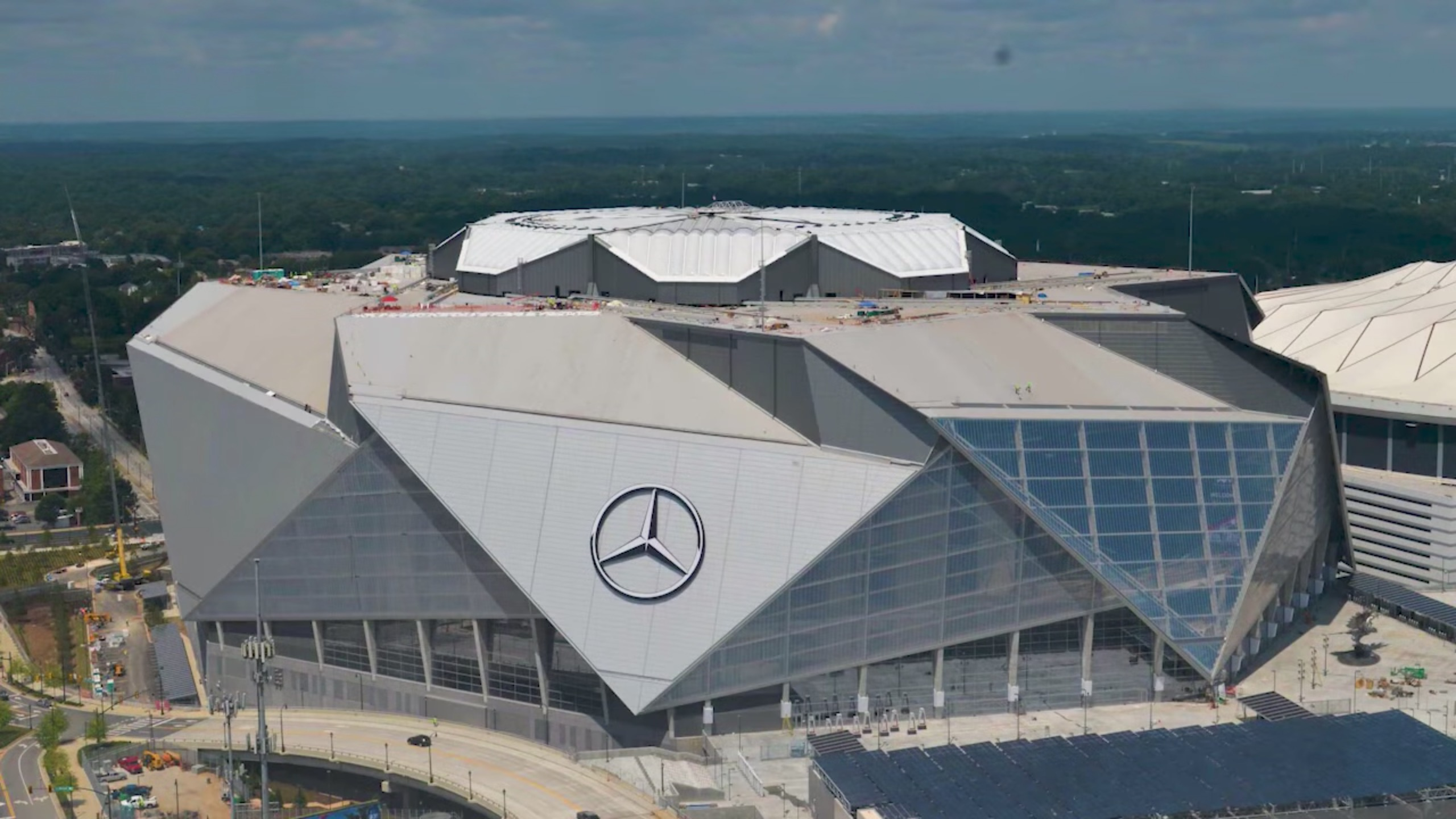
- Mercedes-Benz Stadium in Atlanta, Georgia, hosted the Peach Bowl.
| Pittsburgh Panthers | Michigan State Spartans |
| (11–2) | (10–2) |
| ACC | Big Ten |
| 21 | 31 |
| Head coach: Pat Narduzzi | Head coach: Mel Tucker |
| AP / Coaches / CFP; 13 / 12 / 12 | AP / Coaches / CFP; 11 / 10 / 10 |
| | 1 | 2 | 3 | 4 | Total |
|---|---|---|---|---|---|
| Pittsburgh | 7 | 7 | 7 | 0 | 21 |
| Michigan State | 10 | 0 | 0 | 21 | 31 |
- Date: December 30, 2021
- Season: 2021
- Stadium: Mercedes-Benz Stadium
- Location: Atlanta, Georgia
- MVP: Jayden Reed (WR, Michigan State) & Cal Haladay (LB, Michigan State)
- Favorite: Michigan State by 2.5
- National anthem: Michigan State University Spartan Marching Band
- Referee: Steve Marlowe (SEC)
- Halftime show: Michigan State University Spartan Marching Band, University of Pittsburgh Varsity Marching Band
- Attendance: 41,230

United States TV coverage
- Network: ESPN; ESPN Radio
- Announcers: ESPN: Mark Jones (play-by-play), Robert Griffin III (analyst), and Quint Kessenich (sideline); ESPN Radio: Roy Philpott (play-by-play), Kelly Stouffer (analyst), and Lauren Sisler (sideline)
- Nielsen ratings: 7.6 million viewers

The 2021 Peach Bowl was a college football bowl game played on December 30, 2021, with kickoff at 7:00 p.m. EST and televised on ESPN. It was the 54th edition of the Peach Bowl, and was one of the 2021–22 bowl games concluding the 2021 FBS football season. Sponsored by restaurant chain Chick-fil-A, the game was officially known as the Chick-fil-A Peach Bowl.

The game featured No. 12-ranked Pittsburgh, winners of the Atlantic Coast Conference against No. 10-ranked Michigan State of the Big Ten Conference. Pittsburgh head coach Pat Narduzzi had previously been the defensive coordinator at Michigan State for seven seasons.

== Teams ==
As one of the New Year's Six bowl games, the participants of the game were determined by the College Football Playoff selection committee rather than being based on conference tie-ins.

This was the eighth meeting between Pittsburgh and Michigan State; heading into the game, the Spartans led the all-time series, 6–0–1. The Spartans improved their series record to 7–0–1 all-time. This was the first Peach Bowl appearance for both programs.

=== Pittsburgh Panthers ===
In head coach Pat Narduzzi's seventh season, the Panthers finished in first place in the ACC Coastal division with a record of 11–2, 7–1 in ACC play. It was the first 11-win season for the Panthers since 1981. Pitt was selected to finish fourth in the ACC Coastal, but a return from super senior quarterback Kenny Pickett helped the Panthers to significant wins over Clemson and Tennessee. The Panthers clinched the ACC Coastal division with a 48–38 win over Virginia on senior night, winning the division for the second time since 2018. They defeated Wake Forest in the ACC Championship Game, becoming the first school other than Clemson or Florida State to win the conference championship since 2010.

Pittsburgh quarterback Kenny Pickett was the recipient of many awards for his play during the season. Pickett came in third place in voting for the Heisman Trophy, broke Deshaun Watson's single-season ACC record for passing touchdowns with 40, and broke the Panthers' all-time record for touchdown passes, previously held by Dan Marino. Pickett was also named the ACC Player of the Year, the ACC Offensive Player of the Year, and the Johnny Unitas Golden Arm Award winner. Pittsburgh receiver Jordan Addison was named the Biletnikoff Award winner, which recognizes FBS football's best receiver. Addison was the third Pitt player to win the award, moving Pitt into a tie for having the most Biletnikoff winners.

Pickett announced he would not play in the game to prepare for the NFL draft.

=== Michigan State Spartans ===
In head coach Mel Tucker's second season, Michigan State finished the regular season 10–2 overall and 7–2 in Big Ten play, finishing third in the East division. It was the first 10-win season for the Spartans since 2017. The Spartans, picked to finish in last place in their division after winning only two games the prior season, started the season 8–0, including a win over the eventual Big Ten champion, Michigan, the Wolverines' only loss of the regular season. The Spartans suffered their first loss of the season against Purdue, but still had a chance to win the Big Ten before being blown out by Ohio State.

Running back Kenneth Walker III was named the Walter Camp Award winner as the college football player of the year, decided by a group of coaches and sports information directors. He was also named the winner of the Doak Walker Award as the nation's top running back and became the first player to win the Camp Award while not being named a finalist for the Heisman Trophy. He is the only Michigan State player to win either award in the school's history. Walker led the Spartans and was second in the country with 1,636 rushing yards and added 18 touchdowns. He announced in late December that he would not play in the game to prepare for the NFL draft.

MSU had the nation's worst passing defense, allowing 337.7 yards per game.

Mel Tucker was named the conference's Hayes-Schembechler Coach of the Year (coaches vote) and Dave McClain Coach of the Year (media vote). He was also named Region 3 coach of the year by the American Football Coaches Association.

== Game summary ==
Just like the previous edition of the bowl, the favored team was down 10–21 entering the fourth quarter but rallied to win the game.

2021 Chick-fil-A Peach Bowl

| Quarter | 1 | 2 | 3 | 4 | Total |
|---|---|---|---|---|---|
| No. 12 Pittsburgh | 7 | 7 | 7 | 0 | 21 |
| No. 10 Michigan State | 10 | 0 | 0 | 21 | 31 |

at Mercedes-Benz Stadium • Atlanta, Georgia

- Date: Thursday, December 30, 2021
- Game time: 7:00 p.m. EST
- Game weather: n/a (game played indoors)
- Game attendance: 41,230
- TV announcers (ESPN): Mark Jones (play-by-play), Robert Griffin III (analyst), and Quint Kessenich (sideline)
- Box score

Game information

First quarter

- 13:11 MSU – Jayden Reed 28-yard pass from Payton Thorne, Matt Coghlin kick good. Drive: 3 plays, 29 yards, 0:45. Michigan State 7–0
- 7:57 PITT – Nick Patti 16-yard run, Sam Scarton kick good. Drive: 12 plays, 75 yards, 5:14. tied 7–7
- 2:39 MSU – Matt Coghlin 36-yard field goal. Drive: 11 plays, 57 yards, 5:18. Michigan State 10–7

Second quarter

- 1:02 PITT – Jared Wayne 4-yard pass from Davis Beville, Sam Scarton kick good. Drive: 6 plays, 87 yards, 1:01. Pittsburgh 14–10

Third quarter

- 14:40 PITT – Cam Bright 26-yard fumble return, Sam Scarton kick good. Pittsburgh 21–10

Fourth quarter

- 8:06 MSU – Connor Heyward 15-yard pass from Payton Thorne, two-point conversion failed. Drive: 13 plays, 70 yards, 6:47. Pittsburgh 21–16
- 2:51 MSU – Jayden Reed 22-yard pass from Payton Thorne, two-point conversion pass Jalen Nailor from Payton Thorne. Drive: 11 plays, 71 yards, 2:46. Michigan State 24–21
- 0:22 MSU – Cal Haladay 78-yard interception return, Matt Coghlin kick good. Michigan State 31–21

=== Statistics ===
| Statistics | PITT | MSU |
|---|---|---|
| First downs | 14 | 25 |
| Plays–yards | 55–274 | 88–410 |
| Rushes–yards | 32–104 | 36–56 |
| Passing yards | 170 | 354 |
| Passing: comp–att–int | 16–23–1 | 29–50–1 |
| Time of possession | 24:47 | 35:12 |

| Team | Category | Player | Statistics |
|---|---|---|---|
| Pittsburgh | Passing | Davis Beville | 14/18, 149 yards, 1 TD, 1 INT |
| Pittsburgh | Rushing | Vincent Davis | 12 carries, 43 yards |
| Pittsburgh | Receiving | Jordan Addison | 7 receptions, 114 yards |
| Michigan State | Passing | Payton Thorne | 29/50, 354 yards, 3 TD, 1 INT |
| Michigan State | Rushing | Jordon Simmons | 16 carries, 23 yards |
| Michigan State | Receiving | Jalen Nailor | 6 receptions, 108 yards |
