= 2021 Rutgers Scarlet Knights football team =

American college football season

2021 Rutgers Scarlet Knights football

Gator Bowl, L 10–38 vs. Wake Forest
- Conference: Big Ten Conference
- East Division
- Record: 5–8 (2–7 Big Ten)
- Head coach: Greg Schiano (13th season)
- Offensive coordinator: Sean Gleeson (2nd season)
- Offensive scheme: Spread
- Defensive coordinator: Robb Smith (3rd season)
- Base defense: 4–3
- Home stadium: SHI Stadium

2021 Big Ten Conference football standings
	Conf.			Overall
Team	W		L	W		L
East Division
No. 3 Michigan xy$^	8	–	1	12	–	2
No. 6 Ohio State x	8	–	1	11	–	2
No. 9 Michigan State	7	–	2	11	–	2
Penn State	4	–	5	7	–	6
Maryland	3	–	6	7	–	6
Rutgers	2	–	7	5	–	8
Indiana	0	–	9	2	–	10
West Division
No. 23 Iowa xy	7	–	2	10	–	4
Minnesota	6	–	3	9	–	4
Wisconsin	6	–	3	9	–	4
Purdue	6	–	3	9	–	4
Illinois	4	–	5	5	–	7
Nebraska	1	–	8	3	–	9
Northwestern	1	–	8	3	–	9
Championship: Michigan 42, Iowa 3
^ – College Football Playoff participant; $ – Conference champion; x – Division champion/co-champions; y – Championship game participant; Rankings from AP Poll

The 2021 Rutgers Scarlet Knights football team represented Rutgers University during the 2021 NCAA Division I FBS football season. The Scarlet Knights played their home games at SHI Stadium in Piscataway, New Jersey, and competed as members of the East Division of the Big Ten Conference. They were led by 13th-year head coach Greg Schiano, in the second season of his second stint with Rutgers.

While the team finished their season with a 5–7 record, they were invited to play Wake Forest in the Gator Bowl after Texas A&M withdrew.

== Schedule ==
Date	Time	Opponent	Site	TV	Result	Attendance
September 4	12:00 p.m.	Temple*	SHI Stadium; Piscataway, NJ	BTN	W 61–14	52,519
September 11	2:00 p.m.	at Syracuse*	Carrier Dome; Syracuse, NY	ACCN	W 17–7	31,941
September 18	3:30 p.m.	No. 6 (FCS) Delaware*	SHI Stadium; Piscataway, NJ	BTN	W 45–13	40,129
September 25	3:30 p.m.	at No. 19 Michigan	Michigan Stadium; Ann Arbor, MI	ABC	L 13–20	106,943
October 2	3:30 p.m.	No. 11 Ohio State	SHI Stadium; Piscataway, NJ	BTN	L 13–52	51,006
October 9	12:00 p.m.	No. 11 Michigan State^{†}	SHI Stadium; Piscataway, NJ	BTN	L 13–31	41,117
October 16	12:00 p.m.	at Northwestern	Ryan Field; Evanston, IL	BTN	L 7–21	30,218
October 30	12:00 p.m.	at Illinois	Memorial Stadium; Champaign, IL	BTN	W 20–14	36,942
November 6	3:30 p.m.	No. 21 Wisconsin	SHI Stadium; Piscataway, NJ	BTN	L 3–52	40,280
November 13	12:00 p.m.	at Indiana	Memorial Stadium; Bloomington, IN	BTN	W 38–3	40,171
November 20	12:00 p.m.	at Penn State	Beaver Stadium; University Park, PA	BTN	L 0–28	106,038
November 27	12:00 p.m.	Maryland	SHI Stadium; Piscataway, NJ	BTN	L 16–40	42,729
December 31	11:00 a.m.	vs. No. 17 Wake Forest*	TIAA Bank Field; Jacksonville, FL (Gator Bowl)	ESPN	L 10–38	28,508
*Non-conference game; ^{†}Homecoming; Rankings from AP Poll released prior to the game; All times are in Eastern time

== Roster and Coaches ==
2021 Rutgers Scarlet Knights football team roster
Players
Coaches
Offense

Pos.	#	Name	Class
QB	0	Noah Vedral	Sr
RB	1	Isiah Pacheco	Sr
WR	2	Aron Cruickshank	Sr
QB	3	Evan Simon	Fr
RB	4	Aaron Young	Jr
TE	5	Jovani Haskins	Sr
WR	6	Christian Dremel	So
WR	7	Shameen Jones	Sr
RB	8	Jamier Wright-Collins	Fr
QB	9	Gavin Wimsatt	Fr
TE	10	Matt Alaimo	Jr
WR	11	Don Munnerlyn	Fr
WR	12	Brandon Sanders	Sr
TE	13	Zukudo Igwenagu	So
WR	14	Isaiah Washington	So
QB	15	Cole Snyder	So
QB	17	Gavin Rupp	Fr
WR	18	Bo Melton	Sr
QB	19	Austin Albericci	Jr
QB	21	Johnny Langan	Jr
RB	23	Kyle Monangai	Fr
RB	26	Al-Shadee Salaam	Fr
WR	28	Nasir Montgomery	Fr
RB	33	Parker Day	Sr
RB	39	Nyjon Freeman	Fr
RB	41	Jordan Kinsler	Fr
TE	45	Brandon Myers	Jr
OL	50	C. J. Hanson	So
OL	51	Troy Rainey	Fr
OL	53	Tunde Fatukasi	Fr
OL	54	Cedrice Paillant	Jr
OL	55	Kamar Missouri	Fr
OL	56	Tyler Needham	Fr
OL	57	Ireland Brown	So
OL	58	David Nwaogwugwu	Jr
OL	59	Gus Zilinskas	Fr
OL	60	Moses Gbagbe-Sowah	Fr
OL	65	Bryan Felter	Fr
OL	66	Nick Krimin	Sr
OL	67	Kevin Schaeffer	Fr
OL	69	Brendan Bordner	Sr
OL	70	Reggie Sutton	Jr
OL	71	Raiqwon O'Neal	Jr
OL	72	Hollin Pierce	Fr
OL	73	Terrence Salami	Fr
OL	74	Isaiah Wright	Fr
OL	75	Beau Lanzidelle	Fr
OL	76	Matt Rosso	Jr
OL	77	Sam Vretman	Sr
OL	78	Kevin Toth Jr.	Fr
OL	79	Jason LaVigna	So
WR	80	Frederik Krebs	Fr
WR	81	Zach Goodale	Fr
TE	82	Myles Goddard	Fr
WR	83	Joshua Youngblood	So
WR	84	Ahmirr Robinson	Fr
WR	85	Jessie Parson III	Fr
TE	86	Cooper Heisey	So
TE	87	Tahjay Moore	Fr
TE	88	Carnell Davis	Fr
TE	89	Victor Konopka	Fr

Defense

Pos.	#	Name	Class
DB	0	Christian Izien	Jr
DB	2	Avery Young	Jr
LB	3	Olakunle Fatukasi	Sr
DB	4	Naijee Jones	Sr
DB	5	Keesawn Abraham	Jr
LB	6	Rashawn Battle	Sr
DB	6	Christian Braswell	Jr
DB	7	Robert Longerbeam	Fr
LB	8	Tyshon Fogg	Sr
LB	9	Tyreek Maddox-Williams	Sr
DL	10	Shawn Collins	Fr
LB	11	Drew Singleton	Sr
LB	12	Khayri Banton	Fr
DB	13	Chris Long	Fr
DL	14	Jordan Thompson	Fr
DB	15	Alijah Clark	Fr
DB	16	Max Melton	Fr
LB	17	Deion Jennings	Jr
DB	18	Keenan Reid	Sr
DB	19	Calebe Silva	Sr
DB	20	Elijuwan Mack	Fr
DB	21	Tre Avery	Sr
LB	22	Tyreem Powell	Fr
DL	23	Wesley Bailey	Fr
DB	24	Patrice Rene	Sr
DB	25	Shaquan Loyal	Fr
DL	26	C. J. Onyechi	Sr
DB	27	Jameer Campbell	Sr
LB	28	Aslan Pugh	Sr
DB	29	Lawrence Stevens	Sr
LB	30	Chris Conti	So
DB	31	Michael Robinson II	Fr
DB	32	John Guaimano	So
LB	33	Andrew Vince	Fr
DB	34	Desmond Igbinosun	Fr
DB	35	Max Patterson	Fr
LB	35	Jonathan Pimentel	Jr
DB	37	Joe Lusardi	Fr
LB	38	Austin Dean	Fr
DB	39	Amir Byrd	So
DB	40	Adrian Taffe	Fr
DB	41	Todd Bowles Jr.	Fr
LB	43	Dami Awoyinfa	Fr
DL	44	Brian Ugwu	So
DL	45	Jamree Kromah	Jr
LB	46	Matt Gibney	So
DL	48	Kyonte Hamilton	Fr
DL	50	Julius Turner	Sr
DL	55	Zaire Angoy	Fr
DL	56	Sean Cooper	Fr
DL	57	Stanley Dennis II	Fr
LB	58	Mohamed Toure	So
LB	59	Drew Bethke	So
DL	69	Caleb Patterson	Fr
DL	71	Aaron Lewis	Fr
DL	88	Ifeanyi Maijeh	Sr
DL	90	René Konga	So
DL	91	Cam'Ron Stewart	Fr
DL	92	Mayan Ahanotu	Jr
DL	95	Henry Hughes Jr.	Fr
DL	96	Keshon Griffin	Fr
DL	97	Mike Tverdov	Sr
DL	99	Ryan Keeler	Fr

Special teams

Pos.	#	Name	Class
K	1	Valentino Ambrosio	Jr
K	16	Michael O'Connor	Fr
LS	46	Brendan Shank	Jr
LS	47	Billy Taylor	Sr
LS	49	Zack Taylor	Fr
P	94	Adam Korsak	Sr
K	96	Guy Fava	So
K	99	Eric Bernstein	So

Head coach

- Greg Schiano

Coordinators/assistant coaches

- Augie Hoffmann (running backs)
- Sean Gleeson (offensive coordinator/quarterbacks)
- Jim Panagos (defensive line)
- Robb Smith (defensive coordinator)
- Andrew Aurich (offensive line)
- Tiquan Underwood (wide receivers)
- Bob Fraser (linebackers)
- Nunzio Campanile (tight ends)
- Adam Scheier (special teams coordinator)
- Fran Brown (Secondary)
- Jamaal Westerman (defensive graduate assistant)
- Charlie Noonan (defensive assistant)
- Damaso Munoz (defensive assistant)
- John Perry (offensive analyst)

Legend

- (C) Team captain
- (S) Suspended
- (I) Ineligible
- Injured
- Redshirt

Roster
Last update: November 2, 2020
