= 2021 Gator Bowl (December) =

Postseason college football bowl game

2021 TaxSlayer Gator Bowl
- 77th Gator Bowl
Wake Forest Demon Deacons	Rutgers Scarlet Knights
(10–3)	(5–7)
ACC	Big Ten
38	10
Head coach: Dave Clawson	Head coach: Greg Schiano
AP / Coaches / CFP; 20 / 19 / 17
	1	2	3	4	Total
Wake Forest	14	6	3	15	38
Rutgers	7	3	0	0	10
- Date: December 31, 2021
- Season: 2021
- Stadium: TIAA Bank Field
- Location: Jacksonville, Florida
- MVP: Sam Hartman (QB, Wake Forest) & Johnny Langan (TE, Rutgers)
- Favorite: Wake Forest by 16.5
- Referee: Kevin Mar (Big 12)
- Halftime show: Marching Scarlet Knights, Spirit of Old Gold and Black
- Attendance: 28,508

United States TV coverage
- Network: ESPN
- Announcers: Taylor Zarzour (play-by-play), Matt Stinchcomb (analyst), and Alyssa Lang (sideline)

The 2021 Gator Bowl was a college football bowl game played on December 31, 2021, with kickoff at 11:00 a.m. EST and televised on ESPN. It was the 77th edition of the Gator Bowl, and was one of the 2021–22 bowl games concluding the 2021 FBS football season. Sponsored by financial technology company TaxSlayer, the game was officially known as the TaxSlayer Gator Bowl.

On December 22, Texas A&M withdrew from the bowl, citing a breakout of positive COVID-19 cases and season-ending injuries limiting them to few players. The bowl committee then worked to secure another participant.

On December 23, the NCAA football oversight committee approved Rutgers as the first bowl alternate, under rules whereby five-win teams are ranked by Academic Progress Rate (APR) calculations. Rutgers finished first in APR among the five-win schools and was given the option to accept the bid. The NCAA also allowed the game to be postponed as late as January 10, if needed, by a replacement team. Rutgers accepted the bid, and the game date was not altered.

== Teams ==
The bowl has tie-ins with the Atlantic Coast Conference (ACC) and the Southeastern Conference (SEC). The initially planned matchup of Wake Forest vs. Texas A&M was consistent with those ties-ins, until Texas A&M had to withdraw from the bowl due to an insufficient number of players being available. Rutgers of the Big Ten was subsequently named as a replacement team due to having the highest APR amongst candidates.

=== Wake Forest Demon Deacons ===
Wake Forest enters the bowl with a 10–3 record (7–1 in ACC play). The Demon Deacons won their first eight games, then went 2–3 over their final five games. Wake Forest played two ranked teams, defeating NC State and losing to Pittsburgh.

=== Rutgers Scarlet Knights ===
Rutgers finished their season with a 5–7 record (2–7 in Big Ten play). The Scarlet Knights won their first three games, then lost four in a row, and finished the season by going 2–3 in their final five games. Four of their losses came against ranked teams in FBS.

== Game summary ==
2021 TaxSlayer Gator Bowl

Quarter	1	2	3	4	Total
No. 17 Wake Forest	14	6	3	15	38
Rutgers	7	3	0	0	10

at TIAA Bank Field • Jacksonville, Florida

- Date: Friday, December 31, 2021
- Game time: 11:00 a.m. EST
- Game weather: Cloudy • Temperature: 74 °F (23 °C)
- Game attendance: 28,508
- Referee: Kevin Mar
- TV announcers (ESPN): Taylor Zarzour (play-by-play), Matt Stinchcomb (analyst), and Alyssa Lang (sideline)
- Box score

Game information

First quarter

- 11:34 WF – Brandon Chapman 4-yard pass from Sam Hartman, Nick Sciba kick good. Drive: 9 plays, 84 yards, 3:26. Wake Forest 7–0
- 5:11 RU – Aaron Young 12-yard rush, Valentino Ambrosio kick good. Drive: 12 plays, 75 yards, 6:23. tied 7–7
- 2:16 WF – A. T. Perry 29-yard pass from Sam Hartman, Nick Sciba kick good. Drive: 10 plays, 75 yards, 2:55. Wake Forest 14–7

Second quarter

- 12:02 RU – Valentino Ambrosio 28-yard field goal. Drive: 9 plays, 66 yards, 5:14. Wake Forest 14–10
- 8:21 WF – Nick Sciba 37-yard field goal. Drive: 10 plays, 65 yards, 3:41. Wake Forest 17–10
- 0:00 WF – Nick Sciba 29-yard field goal. Drive: 10 plays, 87 yards, 1:42. Wake Forest 20–10

Third quarter

- 6:37 WF – Nick Sciba 23-yard field goal. Drive: 13 plays, 62 yards, 3:57. Wake Forest 23–10

Fourth quarter

- 12:24 WF – Brandon Chapman 1-yard pass from Sam Hartman, A. T. Perry conversion pass from Hartman. Drive: 7 plays, 62 yards, 3:30. Wake Forest 31–10
- 4:15 WF – Justice Ellison 27-yard run, Nick Sciba kick good. Drive: 11 plays, 69 yards, 6:59. Wake Forest 38–10

=== Statistics ===
Statistics	WF	RU
First downs	28	17
Plays–yards	60–452	47–276
Rushes–yards	37–148	29–111
Passing yards	304	165
Passing: comp–att–int	23–29–0	18–33–2
Time of possession	30:05	29:55

Team	Category	Player	Statistics
Wake Forest	Passing	Sam Hartman	23/39, 304 yards, 3 TD
Wake Forest	Rushing	Justice Ellison	9 rushes, 59 yards, TD
Wake Forest	Receiving	A. T. Perry	10 receptions, 127 yards, TD
Rutgers	Passing	Noah Vedral	8/13, 87 yards, INT
Rutgers	Rushing	Gavin Wimsatt	4 rushes, 39 yards
Rutgers	Receiving	Johnny Langan	6 receptions, 57 yards
